= Silence in the Forest (1937 film) =

1937 film

- Directed by: Hans Deppe
- Written by: Ludwig Ganghofer (novel); Charles Amberg; Joseph Dalman
- Produced by: Peter Ostermayr
- Starring: Hansi Knoteck; Paul Richter; Gustl Gstettenbaur
- Cinematography: Karl Attenberger
- Music by: Hans Ebert
- Production company: Tonlicht-Film
- Release date: 19 August 1937
- Country: Germany
- Language: German

Silence in the Forest (German: Das Schweigen im Walde) is a 1937 German drama film directed by Hans Deppe and starring Hansi Knoteck, Paul Richter and Gustl Gstettenbaur. It was shot at the Babelsberg Studios and Tempelhof Studios in Berlin and on location around Berchtesgaden in Bavaria. The film's sets were designed by the art director Kurt Dürnhöfer and Hans Kuhnert.

== Cast ==
- Hansi Knoteck as Lo Petri
- Paul Richter as Heinz von Ettingen
- Gustl Gstettenbaur as Pepi Praxmaler
- Käte Merk as Burgl, Sennerin
- Rolf Pinegger as Brentlinger, Burgls Vater
- Hans Adalbert Schlettow as Förster Kluibenschädel
- Hermann Erhardt as Toni Mazegger, Jäger
- Rudolf Wendl as Kassian Biermoser, Jäger
- Friedrich Ulmer as Conrad Kersten
- Friedl Haerlin as Edith von Prankha
- Carl Ehrhardt-Hardt as Baron Mucki von Feldberg
- Rudolf Schündler as Martin, Diener
- Hilde Schneider as Anni, Zofe
- Fred Goebel as Sekretär
- Marta Salm as Therese
- Olga Schaub as Vroni

== Bibliography ==
- Goble, Alan. The Complete Index to Literary Sources in Film. Walter de Gruyter, 1999.
