= The Monastery's Hunter =

The Monastery's Hunter (German: Der Klosterjäger) may refer to:

- The Monastery's Hunter (novel), an 1892 novel by Ludwig Ganghofer
- The Monastery's Hunter (1920 film), a German silent film
- The Monastery's Hunter (1935 film), a German sound film
- The Monastery's Hunter (1953 film), a West German film
