= The War of the Oxen =

The War of the Oxen or The Oxen War (German:Der Ochsenkrieg) may refer to:

- War of the Oxen, a 1421-1422 conflict in between two German states
- The War of the Oxen (novel), a 1914 work by Ludwig Ganghofer
- The War of the Oxen (1920 film), a silent film adaptation
- The War of the Oxen (1943 film), a film adaptation
- The War of the Oxen (TV series), a 1987 television adaptation
