= The Violin Maker of Mittenwald =

1950 film

- Directed by: Rudolf Schündler
- Written by: Ludwig Ganghofer (play); Hans Neuert (play); Peter Ostermayr
- Produced by: Peter Ostermayr
- Starring: Willy Rösner; Paul Richter; Franziska Kinz
- Cinematography: Heinz Schnackertz
- Music by: Bernhard Eichhorn
- Production companies: Bavaria Film; Peter Ostermayr Produktion
- Distributed by: Kopp-Filmverleih
- Release date: 10 December 1950
- Running time: 93 minutes
- Country: West Germany
- Language: German

The Violin Maker of Mittenwald (German: Der Geigenmacher von Mittenwald) is a 1950 West German drama film directed by Rudolf Schündler and starring Willy Rösner, Paul Richter and Franziska Kinz.

It is a heimatfilm, based on Ludwig Ganghofer's play of the same name. It was shot at the Bavaria Studios in Munich. Location filming took place in the Austrian Tyrol, Cremona in Italy and Mittenwald in Bavaria, known as a historic centre of violin manufacturing.

== Cast ==
- Willy Rösner as Benedikt Oberbucher
- Paul Richter as Vitus Brandner
- Franziska Kinz as Posthalterin
- Erika von Thellmann as Kuni Schlederer
- Ingeborg Cornelius as Afra Schlederer
- Erika Remberg as Veronika
- Elise Aulinger as Barbara
- Gustl Gstettenbaur as Ludwig
- Heinz-Leo Fischer as Serventa
- Sepp Nigg as Klarinettensteffl
- Thea Aichbichler as Theres
- Rolf Pinegger as Jägerfranzl
- Franz Fröhlich as Posthalter
- Minna Spaeth as Agathe
- Hans Pössenbacher as Loisl
- Karl Finkenzeller as Italienischer Reisender
- Ruth Killer as Freundin von Serventa
- Bertl Schultes as Bürgermeister
- Karl Theodor Langen
- Loni Schultes
- Ruth Kappelsberger
- Georg Bauer
- Melanie Webelhorst

== Bibliography ==
- Goble, Alan. The Complete Index to Literary Sources in Film. Walter de Gruyter, 1999.
