= Storms in May =

Storms in May may refer to:

- Storms in May (1938 film), a German drama film
- Storms in May (1920 film), a German silent drama film
- Storms in May (novel), a 1904 novel by Ludwig Ganghofer
