= The Hunter of Fall =

The Hunter of Fall (German: Der Jäger von Fall) may refer to:

- The Hunter of Fall (novel), an 1883 German novel by Ludwig Ganghofer

and its various adaptations:

- The Hunter of Fall (1918 film), a German silent film
- The Hunter of Fall (1926 film), a German silent film
- The Hunter of Fall (1936 film), a 1936 German drama film
- The Hunter of Fall (1956 film), a 1956 German drama film
- The Hunter of Fall (1974 film), a 1974 German drama film
