= The Cloister of Martins =

1951 film

- Directed by: Richard Häussler
- Written by: Olaf Hinz; Peter Ostermayr
- Based on: The Cloister of Martins by Ludwig Ganghofer
- Produced by: Ottmar Ostermayr
- Starring: Willy Rösner; Gisela Fackeldey; Heinz Engelmann
- Cinematography: Josef Illig; Franz Koch
- Edited by: Claus von Boro
- Music by: Bernhard Eichhorn
- Production company: Peter Ostermayr Produktion
- Distributed by: Kopp-Filmverleih
- Release date: 10 December 1951
- Running time: 96 minutes
- Country: West Germany
- Language: German

The Cloister of Martins (German: Die Martinsklause) is a 1951 West German drama film directed by Richard Häussler and starring Willy Rösner, Gisela Fackeldey and Heinz Engelmann. Based on the novel of the same title by Ludwig Ganghofer, it was part of the postwar wave of heimatfilm (homeland) movies in Germany. It was shot at the Bavaria Studios in Munich and on location around Königssee and Karwendel in the Alps. The film's sets were designed by the art directors Willi Horn and Carl Ludwig Kirmse.

== Cast ==
- Willy Rösner as Waze, Verweser im Gadener Land
- Gisela Fackeldey as Recka
- Heinz Engelmann as Eberwein, Propst von Berchtesgaden
- Paul Richter as Sigenot, der Fischer
- Ingeborg Cornelius as Edelrot
- Ferdinand Anton as Ruedlieb Schönauer
- Sepp Nigg as Wambo
- Walter Janssen as Waldram
- Hubert Kiurina as Henning
- Alf Eder as Sindel
- Armin Dahlen as Rimiger
- Uli Steigberg as Hartwig
- Richard Passavant as Eilbert
- Richard Wagner as Gerold
- Hans Terofal as Otloh
- Karl Tischlinger
- Elise Aulinger as Ulla, eine Magd
- Viktor Gehring as Schönauer, Richtmann im Gaden
- Michl Lang as Wicho, der Knecht
- Viktor Afritsch
- Rolf Pinegger as Eigel, der Köhler
- Bertl Schultes
- Hans Nützels
- Rolf Straub as Domin
- H. Wesenbeck as Schweiker

== Bibliography ==
- Goble, Alan. The Complete Index to Literary Sources in Film. Walter de Gruyter, 1999.
