= Frau Sixta =

1938 German historical drama film by Gustav Ucicky

- German film poster
- Directed by: Gustav Ucicky
- Written by: Anton Kutter; Max Mell
- Based on: Frau Sixta by Ernst Zahn
- Produced by: Peter Ostermayr
- Starring: Gustav Fröhlich; Franziska Kinz; Ilse Werner
- Cinematography: Hans Schneeberger
- Edited by: Paul May
- Music by: Herbert Windt
- Production company: Tonlicht-Film
- Distributed by: UFA
- Release date: 7 September 1938
- Running time: 103 minutes
- Country: Germany
- Language: German

Frau Sixta is a 1938 German historical drama film directed by Gustav Ucicky and starring Gustav Fröhlich, Franziska Kinz and Ilse Werner. It is based on the 1925 novel of the same title by the Swiss writer Ernst Zahn.

The film's sets were designed by the art directors Franz Koehn and Hans Kuhnert. It was shot at the Bavaria Studios in Munich and on location at the winter sports resort of Kühtai in the Austrian Tyrol.

== Plot ==
In the 1860s, a widow runs a post coach station near the Italian border. One day a former army officer arrives on his way to Italy. She persuades him to stay and work for her, and before long they begin a relationship. Complications ensue when her daughter returns home from boarding school and develops an attachment to her mother's lover.

== Cast ==
- Gustav Fröhlich as Markus
- Franziska Kinz as Frau Sixta
- Ilse Werner as Otti, their daughter
- Josefine Dora as Dora, Beschließerin
- Josef Eichheim as Hannes
- Beppo Brem as Korbinian
- Gustav Waldau as Baron Kramer
- Eduard Köck as Pankraz, the old servant
- Heidemarie Hatheyer as Anna, waitress
- Willy Rösner as Forcher, community leader
- Ernst Pröckl as district governor
- Hertha von Hagen as matron
- Walter Holten as customs inspector
- Karl Theodor Langen as municipal secretary
- Rolf Pinegger as Brandner
- Thea Aichbichler as Brandnerin
