= The Crucifix Carver of Ammergau =

1952 film

- German film poster
- German: Der Herrgottschnitzer von Ammergau
- Directed by: Harald Reinl
- Written by: Peter Ostermayr
- Based on: Der Herrgottschnitzer von Ammergau (play) by Ludwig Ganghofer
- Produced by: Ottmar Ostermayr
- Starring: Erich Auer; Elise Aulinger; Willy Rösner
- Cinematography: Josef Illig; Franz Koch
- Edited by: Adolf Schlyssleder
- Music by: Giuseppe Becce; Fred Rauch
- Production company: Peter Ostermayr Produktion
- Distributed by: Kopp-Filmverleih
- Release date: 19 December 1952
- Running time: 90 minutes
- Country: West Germany
- Language: German

The Crucifix Carver of Ammergau (German: Der Herrgottschnitzer von Ammergau) is a 1952 West German romantic drama film directed by Harald Reinl and starring Erich Auer, Elise Aulinger and Willy Rösner. Part of the tradition of heimatfilm, it was based on the 1880 play of the same name by Ludwig Ganghofer. It was made at the Bavaria Studios in Munich and on location in the Bavarian Alps. The film's sets were designed by the art director Max Seefelder.

== Plot ==
A rural wood carver is invited by a painter to come to Munich to study art, leading to tensions with his girlfriend.

== Cast ==
- Erich Auer as Pauli
- Elise Aulinger as Vroni
- Willy Rösner as Wirt
- Ingeborg Cornelius as Loni
- Paul Richter as Baumiller
- Elfie Pertramer as Marei
- Sepp Rist as Jäger
- Heinrich Hauser as Lehnl
- Ludwig Schmid-Wildy as Rötelbacher
- Thea Aichbichler as Mrs. Rötelbacher
- Walter Sedlmayr as Muckl
- Addi Adametz as Liesl
- Karl Bauhofer as bandmaster #1
- Georg Bauer
- Alwin Emmerl
- José Held as bandmaster #2
- Rosl Mayr as Zenzi
