= Paul Richter =

Austrian actor

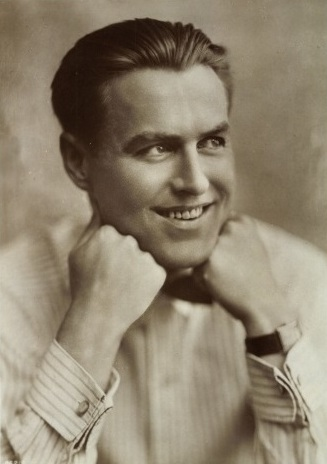
- Born: Paul Martin Eduard Richter; 1 April 1895; Vienna, Austria-Hungary
- Died: 30 December 1961 (aged 66); Vienna, Austria
- Other names: Paul Martin; Edward Richter
- Years active: 1914–1959
- Spouse: Aud Egede-Nissen (m. 1924; div. 1931)

Paul Richter (1 April 1895 – 30 December 1961) was an Austrian film actor. He owed his great popularity in German films of the silent era largely to the directors Joe May and Fritz Lang.

== Biography ==
Richter made his film debut right before World War I in Der Sterbewalzer (1914), directed by Fritz Freund. With the outbreak of the war, his film activity ceased temporarily, and he joined the Austrian Kaiserjäger, serving as an infantryman in the Carpathian Mountains, from which he was later detached to a mountain guide course. His strong feeling for nature, acquired at that time, became a feature of his life, and later, of his movies.

With Joe May's The Indian Tomb (1921) Richter became famous to a wide public for the first time, but it was only with the advent of Dr. Mabuse the Gambler (1922), and especially with Die Nibelungen (1924) – both directed by Fritz Lang – that he became a sex symbol for the 1920s: Germany's answer to male stars of American films such as Ramon Novarro and Rudolph Valentino.

During the turbulent shooting of Die Nibelungen, Richter often had arguments with his director. This reached a climax when Richter refused to appear nude in a scene where the character of Siegfried bathes in the blood of a dragon he has slain. Lang deemed it important to emphasize Richter's body, because the dragon blood is supposed to render Siegfried invulnerable everywhere but one spot on his upper back where a linden leaf happens to adhere to him. When Richter remained adamant, Lang asked fellow player Rudolf Klein-Rogge to double him in this key scene. Richter still objected, on the grounds that the audience would simply suppose Klein-Rogge's bare backside was his own. Eventually, Lang did prevail, and the scene contains both a close shot of Richter's back where the linden leaf lands and a long shot of the nude Klein-Rogge. The success of his Siegfried performance led to offers of other heroic parts for Richter in Peter the Pirate (1925) and Dagfin (1926).

At the beginning of the 1930s he began to be hired more and more for films with regional backgrounds, such The Forester's Daughter (1931) and Hubertus Castle (1934), usually playing huntsmen, foresters or landowners, and often in adaptations of the novels of Ludwig Ganghofer. Thanks to Richter's deep love of nature, and mountaineering experience, he was able to give such performances a reality that contrasted favorably to Rudolf Prack’s similar performances in the 1950s. At the end of the 1950s, a difficult eye operation ended Richter's film career.

He was married to the actress Aud Egede-Nissen from 1924 to 1931 and was stepfather to Georg Richter.

== Selected filmography ==
- Circus of Life (1921)
- The Golden Bullet (1921)
- The Sacrifice of Ellen Larsen (1921)
- Night of the Burglar (1921)
- Murder Without Cause (1921)
- The Indian Tomb (1921)
- Dr. Mabuse the Gambler (1922)
- Die Nibelungen (1924)
- Peter the Pirate (1925)
- The Red Mouse (1926)
- The Bohemian Dancer (1926)
- Eternal Allegiance (1926)
- Battle of the Sexes (1926)
- Dagfin (1926)
- Sister Veronika (1927)
- Tragedy of a Marriage (1927)
- The Queen Was in the Parlour (1927)
- King of the Centre Forwards (1927)
- The City of a Thousand Delights (1927)
- The Beloved of His Highness (1928)
- Snowshoe Bandits (1928)
- Sweet Pepper (1929)
- The Woman in the Advocate's Gown (1929)
- Their Son (1929)
- Eskimo (1930)
- The Forester's Daughter (1931)
- The Night Without Pause (1931)
- The White God (1932)
- The Ringer (1932)
- The Secret of Johann Orth (1932)
- Marshal Forwards (1932)
- Drei Kaiserjäger (1933)
- The Hymn of Leuthen (1933)
- Hubertus Castle (1934)
- What Am I Without You (1934)
- The Tannhof Women (1934)
- The Monastery's Hunter (1935)
- Marriage Strike (1935)
- The Hunter of Fall (1936)
- Silence in the Forest (1937)
- Gordian the Tyrant (1937)
- Fools in the Snow (1938)
- Der Edelweißkönig (1939)
- Waldrausch (1939)
- Der laufende Berg (1941)
- Kohlhiesel's Daughters (1943)
- The War of the Oxen (1943)
- Why Are You Lying, Elisabeth? (1944)
- The Violin Maker of Mittenwald (1950)
- The Cloister of Martins (1951)
- The Crucifix Carver of Ammergau (1952)
- The Monastery's Hunter (1953)
- Hubertus Castle (1954)
- The Hunter of Fall (1956)
- The Shepherd from Trutzberg (1959)
