= Hans Herbert Ulrich =

German film producer (1886–1971)

- Born: 13 March 1886; Freiburg in Schlesien, Province of Silesia, German Empire
- Died: 1971 (aged 84–85); Munich, Bavaria, West Germany
- Occupation: Producer
- Years active: 1931–1950 (film)

Hans Herbert Ulrich (1886–1971) was a German film producer.

== Selected filmography ==
- Pillars of Society (1935)
- The Hour of Temptation (1936)
- A Strange Guest (1936)
- Militiaman Bruggler (1936)
- The Hunter of Fall (1936)
- Carousel (1937)
- A Girl from the Chorus (1937)
- The Chief Witness (1937)
- The Mystery of Betty Bonn (1938)
- Triad (1938)
- Between the Parents (1938)
- Storms in May (1938)
- A Rare Lover (1950)

== Bibliography ==
- Giesen, Rolf. Nazi Propaganda Films: A History and Filmography. McFarland & Co, 2003.
