= When the Evening Bells Ring =

When the Evening Bell Rings (German:Wenn die Abendglocken läuten) may refer to:

- When the Evening Bells Ring (1930 film), a German silent film directed by Hanns Beck-Gaden
- When the Evening Bells Ring (1951 film), a West German film directed by Alfred Braun
