= Gordian the Tyrant =

1937 film

- Directed by: Fred Sauer
- Written by: Rudolf Greinz (novel); Reinhold Meißner; Werner P. Zibaso
- Produced by: Hans Conradi
- Starring: Weiß Ferdl; Paul Richter; Michael von Newlinsky
- Cinematography: Ewald Daub
- Edited by: Alexandra Anatra
- Music by: Viktor Corzilius
- Production companies: Westeuropäische Film; Neue Deutsch Lichtspiel-Syndikat
- Distributed by: Tobis Film
- Release date: 9 April 1937
- Running time: 100 minutes
- Country: Germany
- Language: German

Gordian the Tyrant (German: Gordian, der Tyrann) is a 1937 German comedy film directed by Fred Sauer and starring Weiß Ferdl, Paul Richter and Michael von Newlinsky. The film's sets were designed by the art director Karl Böhm and Erich Czerwonski. Location shooting took place around Wasserburg in Bavaria.

== Synopsis ==
A small-town official in pre-Weimar Germany stands in opposition to any progress in the area. Complications arise when his doppelganger, a theatrical impresario, arrives in the area.

== Cast ==
- Weiß Ferdl as Landeshauptmann Gordian von Schwingenbeutel / Theaterdirektor Ferdinand
- Paul Richter as Fürst
- Michael von Newlinsky as Adjutant des Fürsten
- Trude Haefelin as Gordians Nichte Franziska
- Ellen Hille as Gordians Dienstmädchen Vroni
- Fred Doederlein as Assessor Hans von Planck
- Josef Eichheim as Amtsdiener Högl
- Leo Peukert as Sanitätsrat Dr. Sterzinger
- Marlise Ludwig as Resede Silbernagel
- Irene Andor as Wirtin Toni
- Olga Schaub as Kellnerin
- Maria Hofen as Nachbarin
- Hanns Waschatko as Stammgast
- Josef Dischner as Stammgast

== Bibliography ==
- Waldman, Harry. Nazi Films in America, 1933-1942. McFarland, 2008.
