= Der Herr im Haus =

- Directed by: Heinz Helbig
- Written by: Jacob Geis; Heinz Helbig
- Produced by: Karl Schulz (line producer)
- Starring: See below
- Cinematography: Karl Puth
- Edited by: Margarete Steinborn
- Music by: Leo Leux
- Release date: 1940
- Running time: 80 minutes
- Country: Germany
- Language: German

Der Herr im Haus is a 1940 German film directed by Heinz Helbig.

The film is also known as A Man in the House (Belgian English title) and The Landlord in Australia.

== Cast ==
- Hans Moser as Sixtus Bader
- Maria Andergast as Christa Schellenberg
- Elise Aulinger as Haushälterin
- Leo Slezak as Wolfram Schellenberg
- Hermann Brix as Klaus Frank
- Thea Aichbichler as Mrs. Anger
- Hans Junkermann as Egon von Schwarzendorff
- Julia Serda as Amalie von Schwarzendorff
- Rudolf Schündler as Ferdinand von Schwarzendorff
- Fritz Odemar as Menarek
- Paul Westermeier as Karl
- Friedrich Ulmer as Bongelstedt
- Egon Brosig as Heller
- Karl Skraup as Oberkellner
- Hans Schulz as Sturm
- Ludwig Schmid-Wildy as Lakai
- Heinrich Hauser as Antiquitätenhändler
- Klaus Pohl as Granseder
- Meta Weber
- Fanny Schreck
- Anita Düwell
- Else Kündinger
- Rudolf Stadler
- Senta Esser
- Kurt Uhlig
- Vladimír Pospísil-Born
- Josef Hagen
- Maria von Krüdener
