= Frau Sixta (novel) =

1925 historical novel by the Swiss writer Ernst Zahn

- Author: Ernst Zahn
- Language: German
- Genre: Drama
- Publication date: 1925
- Publication place: Switzerland
- Media type: Print

Frau Sixta is a 1925 historical novel by the Swiss writer Ernst Zahn.

== Adaptation ==
In 1938 it was turned into a German film Frau Sixta directed by Gustav Ucicky and starring Gustav Fröhlich, Franziska Kinz and Ilse Werner.
