= The Hunter of Fall (1936 film) =

1936 film

- Directed by: Hans Deppe
- Written by: Joseph Dalman
- Based on: The Hunter of Fall by Ludwig Ganghofer
- Produced by: Ernst Krüger; Peter Ostermayr; Hans Herbert Ulrich
- Starring: Paul Richter; Rolf Pinegger; Franz Loskarn
- Cinematography: Karl Attenberger
- Edited by: Paul May
- Music by: Albert Fischer
- Production companies: Tonlicht-Film Ostermayr; UFA
- Distributed by: UFA
- Release date: 17 November 1936
- Country: Germany

The Hunter of Fall (German: Der Jäger von Fall) is a 1936 German drama film directed by Hans Deppe and starring Paul Richter, Franz Loskarn and Rolf Pinegger. It is based on the 1883 novel The Hunter of Fall by Ludwig Ganghofer.

The film's sets were designed by the art director Hans Kuhnert.

== Cast ==
- Paul Richter as Friedl, Jagdgehilfe
- Marie Sera as Friedls Mutter
- Franz Loskarn as Hias, Jagdgehilfe
- Georgia Holl as Burgl, Sennerin
- Rolf Pinegger as Lenz, Senner
- Hans Adalbert Schlettow as Huisen Blasi
- Willy Rösner as Birkhofbauer
- Betty Sedlmayr as Loni
- Thea Aichbichler as Buchnerin
- Hans Hanauer as Förster Donhart
- Hélène Robert as Therese, Frau des Försters
- Gustl Gstettenbaur as Toni Donhart
- Philipp Veit as Dr. Rauch
- Josef Eichheim as Brandtner Michl
- Hans Henninger as Leichtl Sepp

== Bibliography ==
- Waldman, Harry (2008). Nazi Films in America, 1933–1942. McFarland. ISBN 978-0-7864-3861-7.
