= The Muzzle =

The Muzzle may refer to:

- The Muzzle (1938 film), a German film
- The Muzzle (1958 film), a West German film remake
