= Storms in May (1938 film) =

- Directed by: Hans Deppe
- Written by: Anton Graf Bossi-Fedrigotti
- Based on: Storms in May by Ludwig Ganghofer
- Produced by: Ernst Krüger; Peter Ostermayr; Hans Herbert Ulrich
- Starring: Viktor Staal; Hansi Knoteck; Ludwig Schmid-Wildy
- Cinematography: Karl Attenberger
- Edited by: Paul May
- Music by: Hans Ebert
- Production companies: UFA; Tonlicht-Film Ostermayr
- Distributed by: UFA
- Release date: 22 February 1938
- Running time: 76 minutes
- Country: Germany
- Language: German

Storms in May (German: Gewitter im Mai) is a 1938 German drama film directed by Hans Deppe and starring Viktor Staal, Hansi Knoteck and Ludwig Schmid-Wildy.

It was based on the 1904 novel of the same title by Ludwig Ganghofer which had previously been made into a 1920 silent film of the same title. It was shot on location in Hamburg, Bavaria, Austria and Switzerland.

The film's sets were designed by the art directors Kurt Dürnhöfer and Hans Kuhnert.

== Cast ==
- Viktor Staal as Poldi Sonnleitner
- Hansi Knoteck as Dorle Weber
- Ludwig Schmid-Wildy as Domini, Dorfschmied
- Anny Seitz as Vroni
- Hans Richter as Hein Andresen
- Hermine Ziegler as Dorles Mutter
- Rolf Pinegger as Förster, Poldis Vater
- Thea Aichbichler as Försterin, Poldis Mutter
- Viktor Gehring as Bürgermeister
- Josef Eichheim as Xaver, Gemeindediener
- Willi Schur as Schiffskoch
- Günther Brackmann
- Gerhard Dammann
- Otti Dietze as Wirtschafterin
- Philipp Manning
- Else Reval
- Roland von Rossi
- Hans Schneider
- Maria Wolf

== Bibliography ==
- Waldman, Harry. Nazi Films in America, 1933-1942. McFarland, 2008.
