= Andreas Hofer (film) =

1929 film

- Directed by: Hans Prechtl
- Written by: Hans Prechtl
- Produced by: Albert Lohner
- Starring: Fritz Greiner; Maly Delschaft; Carl de Vogt; Rolf Pinegger
- Cinematography: Karl Attenberger; Alfonse Lufteck
- Music by: Björn Maseng
- Production company: Hofer-Film
- Distributed by: Union Film (Germany)
- Release date: 15 October 1929
- Running time: 91 minutes
- Country: Germany
- Languages: Silent; German intertitles

Andreas Hofer is a 1929 German silent historical film directed by Hans Prechtl and starring Fritz Greiner, Maly Delschaft and Carl de Vogt. It is based on the story of the Tyrolean innkeeper and patriot Andreas Hofer who led an Austrian uprising against Bavarian and French troops during the Napoleonic Wars.

== Cast ==
- Fritz Greiner as Andreas Hofer
- Maly Delschaft as Anna, Hofer's wife
- Carl de Vogt as Eisenstecken, Hofer's adjutant
- Rolf Pinegger as Gasteiger innkeeper
- Grit Haid as Moidl, Hofer's daughter
- Adolf Grell as Napoleon
- Georg John as Franz Raffl, a farmer
- Oscar Marion as Toni, a Sergeant
- Hermann Pfanz as Bernklau, a Colonel
- Max Reichlmair as Joseph Speckbacher
- Karl Reidlbach as Swet, Hofer's secretary
- Franz Stein as Father Haspinger

== Bibliography ==
- Wolfram, Ilse (2010). 200 Jahre Volksheld Andreas Hofer auf der Bühne und im Film [200 years of folk hero Andreas Hofer on stage and in film]. Munich: Herbert Utz. ISBN 978-3-8316-0932-1.
