= Joseph Dalman =

German screenwriter (1882–1944)

- Born: 31 October 1882; Regensburg, German Empire
- Died: 20 June 1944 (aged 61); Munich West Germany
- Occupation: Screenwriter
- Years active: 1920–1944 (film)

Joseph Dalman (31 October 1882 – 20 June 1944) was a German screenwriter.

== Selected filmography ==
- The Gambling Den of Montmartre (1928)
- The Man with the Limp (1928)
- Almenrausch and Edelweiss (1928)
- The Women's War (1928)
- Brother Bernhard (1929)
- Left of the Isar, Right of the Spree (1929)
- When the White Lilacs Bloom Again (1929)
- When the Evening Bells Ring (1930)
- The Champion Shot (1932)
- The Master Detective (1933)
- At Blonde Kathrein's Place (1934)
- The Hunter of Fall (1936)
- Militiaman Bruggler (1936)
- There Were Two Bachelors (1936)
- Silence in the Forest (1937)
- The Sinful Village (1940)
- Left of the Isar, Right of the Spree (1940)
- The War of the Oxen (1943)

== Bibliography ==
- Giesen, Rolf. Nazi Propaganda Films: A History and Filmography. McFarland & Co, 2003.
