= The Sacrifice of Ellen Larsen =

1921 film

- German: Das Opfer der Ellen Larsen
- Directed by: Paul L. Stein
- Written by: Max Monato; Paul L. Stein
- Produced by: Paul Davidson
- Starring: Alfred Able; Marija Leiko
- Cinematography: Karl Dennert; Erich Waschneck
- Production company: PAGU
- Distributed by: UFA
- Release date: 22 April 1921
- Country: Germany
- Languages: Silent; German intertitles

The Sacrifice of Ellen Larsen (German: Das Opfer der Ellen Larsen) is a 1921 German silent film directed by Paul L. Stein and starring Alfred Abel and Marija Leiko.

The film's art direction was by Kurt Richter.

== Cast ==
In alphabetical order

- Alfred Abel as Norbert Larsen
- Willy Kaiser-Heyl as Magnus, moneylender
- Arnold Korff as Rasmussen - General manager
- Marija Leiko as Ellen Larsen
- Karl Platen as Dr. Hennings
- Paul Richter as Gert
- Marga von Kierska
