= Violet (1921 film) =

1921 film

- Directed by: Artur Holz
- Written by: Kurt Aram (novel); Julius Sternheim; Artur Holz
- Produced by: Erich Pommer
- Starring: Olga Chekhova; Hans Kuhnert; Eugen Burg; Adele Sandrock
- Cinematography: Paul Holzki
- Production company: Decla-Bioscop
- Distributed by: Decla-Bioscop
- Release date: 11 November 1921
- Running time: 54 minutes
- Country: Germany
- Languages: Silent; German intertitles

Violet is a 1921 German silent drama film directed by Artur Holz and starring Olga Chekhova, Hans Kuhnert and Eugen Burg. The film was based on a novel by Kurt Aram. It premiered at the cinema in the Tauentzienpalast on 11 November 1921.

== Cast ==
- Olga Chekhova as Violet
- Hans Kuhnert as Herbert von Strehlen
- Eugen Burg as Hans von Maalen
- Adele Sandrock as Violet's Mother
- Maria Dona as Archis Erzieherin
- Emmi Emmering as Lore
- Paul Gerhardt as Andreas, Gärtnerbursche
- Willy Hendrichs as Lateska, Detektiv
- Hedwig Karma as Die Zofe Violets
- Bogumil Miler as Lipp, ein Fischer
- Loni Nest as Klein Archibald, Kind der Strehlens
- Hans Rohde as Forsten

== Bibliography ==
- Hardt, Ursula. From Caligari to California: Erich Pommer's life in the International Film Wars. Berghahn Books, 1996.
