= Walther Süssenguth =

German actor

Walther Suessenguth
- Born: Walther Wilhelm Rudolf Suessenguth; February 8, 1900; Schleiz, Thuringia, German Empire
- Died: April 28, 1964 (aged 64); East Berlin, East Germany
- Occupation: Actor

Walther Süssenguth (February 8, 1900 - April 28, 1964) was a German actor.

== Filmography ==
Year	Title	Role	Notes
1934	The Rider on the White Horse	Ole Peters	
1934	Ich sehne mich nach dir	Jean Leman, Impresario	
1935	The Old and the Young King		
1935	Familie Schimek		
1935	Pillars of Society	Urbini	
1936	Augustus the Strong	Fürstenberg	
1938	Frühlingsluft		
1938	Rubber	Capitano des Urwaldforts	
1939	The Green Emperor	Jury Member	
1939	Central Rio	Schmuggler	
1940	Das Herz der Königin	Lord Jacob Stuart	
1940	Der Sündenbock		
1941	Ohm Krüger	Sergeant	
1941	The Way to Freedom	Morescu	
1941	Menschen im Sturm	Commandant	
1942	Rembrandt	Piet	
1942	Bismarck's Dismissal	Tsar Alexander II	
1944	Der Verteidiger hat das Wort	Investigative Magistrate	
1945	Das alte Lied	Count Richard Waldem	
1947	Jan und die Schwindlerin	Jan Remmers	
1953	So ein Affentheater		
1954	Captain Wronski		
1955	Secrets of the City	Böhnke	
1955	Doctor Solm	Prof. Berding	
1955	08/15 – Part 2		
1955	One Woman Is Not Enough?	Dr. Körfer	
1956	The Czar and the Carpenter	Admiral Lefort	
1957	Duped Till Doomsday	Commandant von der Saale	
1963	Tim Frazer	Walters	Episode: "Sechster Teil"

=== Dubbing ===
- The V.I.P.s (1963) – Max Buda
