= The Lady in Black (1928 film) =

1928 film

- Directed by: Franz Osten
- Written by: Richard Arvay (novel); Herbert Nossen; Ladislaus Vajda
- Produced by: Peter Ostermayr
- Starring: Liane Haid; Marcella Albani; Charles Lincoln
- Cinematography: Karl Attenberger
- Production company: Peter Ostermayr Produktion
- Distributed by: Deutsche Universal-Film
- Release date: 27 April 1928
- Country: Germany
- Languages: Silent; German intertitles

The Lady in Black (German: Die Dame in Schwarz) is a 1928 German silent film directed by Franz Osten and starring Liane Haid, Marcella Albani and Charles Lincoln.

The film's sets were built by the art directors Bruno Lutz and Franz Seemann.

== Cast ==
- Liane Haid as Irena Wolkowa
- Marcella Albani as Prinzessin Nedelkoff aka Fr. Bennigsen
- Charles Lincoln as Julian Holt - Boxer
- Kurt Vespermann as Carl Toll, Redakteur
- Erich Kaiser-Titz as Lawyer Golwisch
- Albert Paulig as Privatdetektiv Olsen
- Gyula Szőreghy as Petroff
- Hermann Picha as Franz Kiekebusch
- John Mylong as Werner Bennigsen

== Bibliography ==
- Parish, James Robert. Film Actors Guide. Scarecrow Press, 1977.
