= Loni Nest =

German actress (1915–1990)

- Born: Eleonore Nest; 4 August 1915; Berlin, German Empire
- Died: 2 October 1990 (aged 75); Nice, France
- Occupation: Actress
- Years active: 1918–1933

Eleonore "Loni" Arnault (née Nest, 4 August 1915 – 2 October 1990), known professionally by her maiden name of Loni Nest, was a German actress. Born in Berlin, she was a child star of German silent films in the 1920s. She was filmed for the first time at the age of four weeks.

== Life and film career ==
After more than 40 movies, she ended her movie career in 1928 at the age of 13. In 1933 she played in one last movie in France. Her whereabouts after 1933 remained unknown for several decades, but it was eventually discovered that she died at the age of 75 on 2 October 1990 in the French town Nice.

In 2014, the website Forever Missed published an obituary that ostensibly revealed that Nest had died in Hawaii in 2014 at the age of 98. It also described details of Nest's life after she left Germany and moved to America. Various websites including the Internet Movie Database quickly adopted this information. It was soon discovered, however, that both the time and location of her death as well as the details about her later life were a hoax. According to the German newspaper Die Welt, German film historian Toni Schieck had discovered years before that Nest's sister Ursula had moved to the United States and died in Florida in 2007. Through her family, Schieck discovered that Nest had married and taken the last name Arnault. She moved to France where she died at the age of 75 in Nice.

== Filmography ==
- 1918: The Story of Dida Ibsen
- 1919: Die Ehe der Frau Mary
- 1919: Opium
- 1919: Harakiri
- 1920: Kämpfende Gewalten oder Welt ohne Krieg
- 1920: Der Reigen – Ein Werdegang
- 1920: Patience
- 1920: Johannes Goth
- 1920: Der Golem, wie er in die Welt kam
- 1920: The Guilt of Lavinia Morland
  - The Wandering Image (1920)
- 1921: Man Overboard
- 1921: Ein Erpressertrick
- 1921: Schloß Vogelöd
- 1921: Violet
- 1921: Die Minderjährige – Zu jung fürs Leben
- 1921: Parisian Women
- 1921: The Convict of Cayenne
- 1921: The Pearl of the Orient
- 1921: Sturmflut des Lebens
- 1922: Alone in the Jungle
- 1922: Sunken Worlds
- 1922: Tabitha, Stand Up
- 1922: A Dying Nation (2 parts)
- 1922: Aus den Erinnerungen eines Frauenarztes (2 parts)
- 1923: Quarantäne
- 1923: Tragedy of Love
- 1923: Fräulein Raffke
- 1923: The Little Napoleon
- 1923: Black Earth
- 1924: Two Children
- 1924: Mother and Child
- 1924: The Evangelist
- 1925: Fire of Love
- 1925: Die Prinzessin und der Geiger
- 1925: Die freudlose Gasse
- 1925: A Song from Days of Youth
- 1928: The Saint and Her Fool
- 1928: The Story of a Little Parisian
- 1933: L'Épervier
