= Left of the Isar, Right of the Spree (1940 film) =

1940 film

- Directed by: Paul May
- Written by: Joseph Dalman; Peter Ostermayr
- Produced by: Peter Ostermayr
- Starring: Fritz Kampers; Leo Peukert; Charlotte Schellhorn
- Cinematography: Bruno Stephan
- Edited by: Margret Noell
- Music by: Ludwig Schmidseder
- Production companies: Bavaria Film; UFA; Tonlicht-Film
- Release date: 5 September 1940
- Country: Germany
- Language: German

Left of the Isar, Right of the Spree (German: Links der Isar – rechts der Spree) is a 1940 German comedy film directed by Paul May and starring Fritz Kampers, Leo Peukert and Charlotte Schellhorn.

It was made at the Bavaria Studios in Munich. The film's sets were designed by Hans Kuhnert.

== Cast ==
- Fritz Kampers as Xaver Spöckmeier
- Leo Peukert as Georg Oberhauser
- Charlotte Schellhorn as Anni Spöckmeier
- Fritz Genschow as Alfred Schulze
- Grethe Weiser as Erna
- Hilde Sessak as Lotte
- Hans Adalbert Schlettow as Baron Wickinger
- Oscar Sabo as Vater Schulze
- Hermine Ziegler as Sophie Spöckmeier
- Martin Schmidhofer as Pepperl Spöckmeier
- Lotte Spira as Mutter Schulze
- Vera Complojer as Tante Berta
- Margarete Haagen as Tante Rosa
- Wilhelmine Fröhlich as Theres
- Josef Eichheim as 1. Stammtischfreund
- Ernst Sattler as 2. Stammtischfreund
- Franz Fröhlich as 3. Stammtischfreund
- Erika Glässner as Pensionswirtin

== Bibliography ==
- Waldman, Harry (2008). Nazi Films in America, 1933–1942. Jefferson, NC: McFarland. ISBN 978-0-7864-3861-7.
