= The War of the Oxen (1943 film) =

1943 film

- Directed by: Hans Deppe
- Written by: Ludwig Ganghofer (novel); Peter Ostermayr; Joseph Dalman
- Starring: Elfriede Datzig; Paul Richter; Wastl Lichtmanegger
- Cinematography: Ekkehard Kyrath
- Edited by: Ilse Selckmann-Wienecke
- Music by: Ludwig Schmidseder; Winfried Zillig
- Production company: UFA
- Distributed by: Deutsche Filmvertriebs
- Release date: 16 January 1943
- Running time: 95 minutes
- Country: Germany
- Language: German

The War of the Oxen (German: Der Ochsenkrieg) is a 1943 German historical film directed by Hans Deppe and starring Elfriede Datzig, Paul Richter and Wastl Lichtmanegger. It is an adaptation of Ludwig Ganghofer's 1914 novel of the same title.

Location shooting took place in the Bavarian Alps.

== Cast ==
- Elfriede Datzig as Julia Someiner
- Paul Richter as Lampert Someiner
- Wastl Lichtmanegger as Jakob Someiner
- Willy Rösner as Runotter
- Fritz Kampers as Malimmes
- Ernst Sattler as Amtmann Someiner
- Thea Aichbichler as Marianne Someiner
- Ludwig Schmid-Wildy as Marimpfel
- Ernst Stahl-Nachbaur as Heinrich von Burghausen
- Friedrich Ulmer as Peter Pienzenauer
- Georg Vogelsang as Schwarzecker
- Carl Ehrhardt-Hardt as Sigwart
- Hans Schulz as Heiner
- Rolf Pinegger as Ruechsam
- Walter Ladengast as Ludwig von Ingolstadt
- Hans Baumann as Landvogt
- Karl Günther as Seipersdorfer
- Hans Hanauer as Lahner
- Harry Hardt as Wolfl
- Herbert Hübner
- Walter Janssen as Franziskus
- Leopold Kerscher as Achenauer
- Ludwig Rupert as Hinterseer
- Norbert Rohringer

== Bibliography ==
- Goble, Alan. The Complete Index to Literary Sources in Film. Walter de Gruyter, 1999.
