= Willy Rösner =

German actor

- Born: 19 May 1893; Rosenheim, Bavaria, German Empire
- Died: 2 October 1966 (aged 73); Munich, Bavaria, West Germany
- Occupation: Actor
- Years active: 1929-1968 (film and TV)

Willy Rösner (1893–1966) was a German stage and film actor.

== Selected filmography ==
- The King's Prisoner (1935)
- The Monastery's Hunter (1935)
- The Hunter of Fall (1936)
- Frau Sixta (1938)
- Water for Canitoga (1939)
- Late Love (1943)
- The War of the Oxen (1943)
- The Violin Maker of Mittenwald (1950)
- The Cloister of Martins (1951)
- Border Post 58 (1951)
- Cuba Cabana (1952)
- The Crucifix Carver of Ammergau (1952)
- The Monastery's Hunter (1953)
- Salto Mortale (1953)
- Marriage Strike (1953)
- The Beautiful Miller (1954)
- Ludwig II (1955)
- The Royal Waltz (1955)
- As Long as You Live (1955)
- In Hamburg When the Nights Are Long (1956)
- Kitty and the Great Big World (1956)
- Marriages Forbidden (1957)
- And Lead Us Not Into Temptation (1957)
- Black Forest Cherry Schnapps (1958)
- Storm in a Water Glass (1960)
- Tales of a Young Scamp (1964)

== Bibliography ==
- William B. Parrill. European Silent Films on Video: A Critical Guide. McFarland, 2006.
