= Franz Loskarn =

German actor (1890–1978)

- Born: 3 May 1890; Munich, German Empire
- Died: 23 April 1978 (aged 87); Munich, West Germany
- Occupation: Film actor
- Years active: 1928–1972

Franz Loskarn (3 May 1890 – 22 April 1978) was a German film actor.

== Selected filmography ==
- Behind Monastery Walls (1928)
- Almenrausch and Edelweiss (1928)
- Love on Skis (1928)
- Restless Hearts (1928)
- Tracks in the Snow (1929)
- When the Evening Bells Ring (1930)
- Um das Menschenrecht (1934)
- Marriage Strike (1935)
- The Hunter of Fall (1936)
- Women's Regiment (1936)
- A Heart Beats for You (1949)
- Royal Children (1950)
- Kissing Is No Sin (1950)
- Two in One Suit (1950)
- Trouble in Paradise (1950)
- Monks, Girls and Hungarian Soldiers (1952)
- Marriage Strike (1953)
- The Monastery's Hunter (1953)
- Hubertus Castle (1954)
- The Blacksmith of St. Bartholomae (1955)
- I Know What I'm Living For (1955)
- Thomas Müntzer (1956)
- Two Bavarians in St. Pauli (1956)
- The Vulture Wally (1956)
- The Twins from Zillertal (1957)
- Jacqueline (1959)
- At Blonde Kathrein's Place (1959)
