= The Monastery's Hunter (1953 film) =

1953 film

- Directed by: Harald Reinl
- Written by: Peter Ostermayr
- Based on: The Monastery's Hunter (novel) by Ludwig Ganghofer
- Produced by: Peter Ostermayr
- Starring: Erich Auer; Marianne Koch; Paul Hartmann
- Cinematography: Franz Koch
- Edited by: Adolf Schlyssleder
- Music by: Bernhard Eichhorn
- Production company: Peter Ostermayr Produktion
- Distributed by: Kopp-Filmverleih
- Release date: 28 August 1953
- Running time: 80 minutes
- Country: West Germany
- Language: German

The Monastery's Hunter (German: Der Klosterjäger) is a 1953 West German historical drama film directed by Harald Reinl and starring Erich Auer, Marianne Koch and Paul Hartmann. It is based on the 1892 novel of the same title by Ludwig Ganghofer which had previously been made into a 1920 silent film and a 1935 sound film.

It was shot at the Bavaria Studios in Munich and on location around the Königssee, the Dolomites, Rome and Dalmatia. The film's sets were designed by the art director Carl M. Kirmse.

== Cast ==
- Erich Auer as Haymo
- Marianne Koch as Gittli
- Paul Hartmann as Herr Heinrich
- Paul Richter as Graf Dietwald
- Karl Skraup as Vogt
- Margarete Haagen as Cäcilia
- Joe Stöckel as Pater Severin
- Kurt Heintel as Wolfrat
- Willy Rösner as Eggebauer
- Rudolf Vogel as Bader
- Rolf Pinegger
- Alfred Pongratz as Pater Medicus
- Martin Schmidhofer as Walti
- Gusti Kreissl as Josepha
- Harriet Geßner as Zenza
- Alexander Malachowsky as Schreiber
- Minna Fröhlich as Eggebäuerin
- Barbara Gallauner
- Christine Kaufmann as Vronerl
- Franz Loskarn
- Hans Nützels as Mönch
- Sepp Schmid as Bauer
- Irmingard von Freyberg as Oberin Walpurga

== Bibliography ==
- Bock, Hans-Michael; Bergfelder, Tim, eds. (2009). The Concise Cinegraph: Encyclopaedia of German Cinema. New York: Berghahn Books. ISBN 978-1-57181-655-9.
