= Kurt Dürnhöfer =

German art director

- Born: 3 January 1886; Berlin, German Empire
- Died: 1958 (aged 71–72); Bavaria, West Germany
- Occupation: Art director
- Years active: 1906-1949 (film)

Kurt Dürnhöfer (1886–1958) was a German art director.

== Selected filmography ==
- Ruth's Two Husbands (1919)
- The Living Dead (1919)
- A Dying Nation (1922)
- The Emperor's Old Clothes (1923)
- Taras Bulba (1924)
- Almenrausch and Edelweiss (1928)
- Greetings and Kisses, Veronika (1933)
- The Two Seals (1934)
- Elisabeth and the Fool (1934)
- At the Strasbourg (1934)
- His Late Excellency (1935)
- Last Stop (1935)
- A Strange Guest (1936)
- Land of Love (1937)
- Silence in the Forest (1937)
- Storms in May (1938)
- Secret File W.B.1 (1942)
- A Heart Beats for You (1949)

== Bibliography ==
- Bogusław Drewniak. Der Deutsche Film 1938-1945: ein Gesamtüberblick. Droste, 1987.
