= War of the Oxen =

1421–1422 conflict in between two German states

The War of the Oxen (German: Der Ochsenkrieg) was a military conflict between the two German states of County Haag and Bavaria-Landshut which lasted between 1421 and 1422. It was an offshoot of the larger Bavarian War (1420–1422).

In 1914 the German writer Ludwig Ganghofer wrote The War of the Oxen, a novel using the war as a backdrop. The novel has subsequently been made into two films and a television series.

== Bibliography ==
- Nemoianu, Virgil. Postmodernism and Cultural Identities: Conflicts and Coexistence. CUA Press, 2010.
