= The Hunter of Fall (1956 film) =

1956 film

The Hunter of Fall (German: Der Jäger von Fall) is a 1956 German drama film directed by Gustav Ucicky and starring Rudolf Lenz, Traute Wassler and Erwin Strahl. It is based on the novel The Hunter of Fall by Ludwig Ganghofer. A Bavarian poacher battles a gamekeeper.

== Cast ==
- Rudolf Lenz as Friedl
- Traute Wassler as Marel
- Erwin Strahl as Blasi
- Heinrich Hauser as Senner Lenzl
- Paul Richter as Dr. Harlander
- Kurt Großkurth as Niedergstötter, customs officer
- Alfred Pongratz as Quack
- Ernst Firnholzer as forester von Fall
- Ernst Reinhold as Simerl, poacher
- Beppo Schwaiger as Anderl, hunting assistant
- Peter Mühlen as Göri, poacher
