= Marriage Strike (1953 film) =

1953 film

- German: Ehestreik
- Directed by: Joe Stöckel
- Written by: Julius Pohl (play); Peter Ostermayr
- Produced by: Ottmar Ostermayr; Peter Ostermayr
- Starring: Erich Auer; Lore Frisch; Wastl Witt
- Cinematography: Franz Koch
- Edited by: Adolf Schlyssleder
- Music by: Giuseppe Becce
- Production company: Peter Ostermayr Produktion
- Distributed by: Kopp-Filmverleih
- Release date: 23 November 1953
- Running time: 90 minutes
- Country: West Germany
- Language: German

Marriage Strike (German: Ehestreik) is a 1953 West German comedy film directed by Joe Stöckel and starring Erich Auer, Lore Frisch and Wastl Witt. It is a remake of the 1935 film of the same title directed by Georg Jacoby. It was shot at the Bavaria Studios in Munich and on location in Upper Bavaria. The film's sets were designed by the art director Carl Ludwig Kirmse.

== Cast ==
- Erich Auer as Ludwig
- Lore Frisch as Peppi
- Wastl Witt as Bartl
- Elise Aulinger as Annamirl
- Georg Bauer as Wurzer
- Elfie Pertramer as Rosa
- Gustl Gstettenbaur as Göppler
- Ellen Hille as Mariandl
- Beppo Brem as Schubert
- Erni Singerl as Barbara
- Willy Rösner as mayor
- Dely Drexler as housekeeper
- Barbara Gallauner as Kramerin
- Harry Hertzsch as Zeiger
- Gustav Waldau as Pfarrer
- Hans Fitz as Bärenwirt
- Walter Sedlmayr as Wimpflinger
- Gabriele Reismüller as Hanni
- Franz Loskarn as Gendarm

== Bibliography ==
- Goble, Alan. The Complete Index to Literary Sources in Film. Walter de Gruyter, 1999.
