= The Czar and the Carpenter =

1956 film

The Czar and the Carpenter (German title:Zar und Zimmermann) is a 1956 East German musical comedy film directed by Hans Müller and starring Willy A. Kleinau, Bert Fortell and Lore Frisch. It is an adaptation of the opera Zar und Zimmermann by Albert Lortzing. It is set around the Russian Tsar Peter the Great's secret visit to the Dutch Republic to study shipbuilding in the seventeenth century.

== Main cast ==
- Willy A. Kleinau: Van Bettt, Bürgermeister von Saardam
- Bert Fortell: Peter Michailow
- Lore Frisch: Marie
- Günther Haack: Peter Iwanow
- Walther Suessenguth: Admiral Lefort
- Erich Arnold: Marquis Charteauneuf
- Kurt Mühlhardt: Lord Syndham
- Paula Braend: Witwe Brouwe
