= Storms in May (1920 film) =

1920 film

- Directed by: Ludwig Beck
- Written by: Ludwig Beck
- Based on: Storms in May by Ludwig Ganghofer
- Cinematography: Franz Planer
- Production company: Emelka-Konzern
- Release date: January 1920
- Country: Germany
- Languages: Silent; German intertitles

Storms in May (German: Gewitter im Mai) is a 1920 German silent drama film directed by Ludwig Beck. It is based on the novel of the same title by Ludwig Ganghofer. It was made at the Emelka Studios in Munich. A 1938 film Storms in May was adapted from the same story.

== Cast ==
- Fritz Greiner as Domimi
- Josef Kirchner-Lang
- Rosa Kirchner-Lang
- Ria Mabeck as Samaya
- Carl René as Poldi
- Josef Schmitt
- Carl Sick
- Thea Steinbrecher as Dorle
- Toni Wittels

== Bibliography ==
- Bock, Hans-Michael & Bergfelder, Tim. The Concise CineGraph. Encyclopedia of German Cinema. Berghahn Books, 2009.
