= Ludwig Schmidseder =

German composer and pianist

Ludwig Schmidseder (24 August 1904, in Passau – 21 June 1971, in Munich) was a German composer and pianist of the "Light Muse". Several of his Schlager compositions are still popular tunes today.

The young Schmidseder followed his father's wishes and trained as a banker, whilst taking piano lessons in secret. He furthered his musical education at the Munich Conservatorium, then left for South America in 1926, ending up in Rio de Janeiro. Starting out as a dishwasher, he went on to become an entertainer and play in a trio on ocean cruises. Schmidseder composed music for the trio, and developed into a virtuoso piano player.

From 1930 he worked in Berlin, composing film music, creating operettas and writing more than 500 songs, some of which became much-loved hits. He moved from being a bar pianist (until 1936) to being the house composer at the old Berlin Metropol-Theatre. His operetta Die Oder Keine (That One or No One) was performed more than 600 times.

Schmidseder joined the NSDAP on 1 May 1933.

After World War II, Schmidseder continued to compose film music and appear in films. The corpulent cook would later become famous as a TV cook and produced a book of recipes.

== Selected works ==
=== Operettas ===
- 1938 - Melodie der Nacht (Melody of the Night)
- 1939 - Die oder keine (That One or No One) (premiered on 20 March 1939, in the Berlin Metropol Theatre)
- 1940 - Frauen im Metropol (Women in the Metropol) (premiered on 27 September 1940, in the Berlin Metropol Theatre)
- 1944 – Linzer Torte (premiered on 26 May 1944 in the Landestheater Linz)
- 1949 - Abschiedswalzer (Farewell Waltzes) (premiered on 8 September 1949, in Vienna; libretto by Hubert Marischka and Rudolf Österreicher)

=== Schlager ===
- Gitarren spielt auf (1934, text by Ralph Maria Siegel) (Strike Up Guitars)
- Ich trink den Wein nicht gern allein (I Prefer Not To Drink Wine Alone)
- I hab die schönen Maderln net erfunden (1938, text by Theo Prosel) (I Did Not Invent Pretty Girls)
- Komm doch in meine Arme (Come To My Arms)
- Ein kleines weißes Haus (A Small White House)
- Tango Marina

=== Films ===
- The Country Schoolmaster (1933)
- Dream of the Rhine (1933)
- Left of the Isar, Right of the Spree (1940)
- A Salzburg Comedy (1943)
- The War of the Oxen (1943)
- Why Are You Lying, Elisabeth? (1944)
- A Cheerful House (1944)
- Friday the Thirteenth (1949)
- No Sin on the Alpine Pastures (1950)
- The Lady in Black (1951)
- The Landlady of Maria Wörth (1952)
- The Inn on the Lahn (1955)
