= Secret File W.B.1 =

1942 film

- Directed by: Herbert Selpin
- Written by: Franz Weichenmayr; Walter Zerlett-Olfenius; Curt J. Braun; Herbert Selpin
- Based on: Der Eiserne Seehund by Hans Arthur Thies
- Produced by: Carl Wilhelm Tetting
- Starring: Alexander Golling; Eva Immermann; Richard Häussler
- Cinematography: Franz Koch
- Edited by: Friedel Buckow
- Music by: Franz Doelle
- Production company: Bavaria Film
- Distributed by: Bavaria Film
- Release date: 2 February 1942
- Running time: 92 minutes
- Country: Germany
- Language: German

Secret File W.B.1 (German: Geheimakte W.B.1) is a 1942 German historical drama film directed by Herbert Selpin and starring Alexander Golling, Eva Immermann and Richard Häussler. The film portrays Wilhelm Bauer and his work on developing the submarine. It was based on the novel Der Eiserne Seehund by Hans Arthur Thies. It was shot at the Bavaria Studios in Munich. The film's sets were designed by the art directors Kurt Dürnhöfer, Fritz Lück, Bruno Lutz and Fritz Maurischat.

== Cast ==
- Alexander Golling as Wilhelm Bauer
- Eva Immermann as Sophie Hösly
- Richard Häussler as Großfürst Konstantin
- Herbert Hübner as Admiral Brommy
- Wilhelm P. Krüger as Vater Hösly
- Günther Lüders as Schiffsbauer Karl Hösly
- Willi Rose as Werftmeister Schultze
- Gustav Waldau as König Maximilian
- Justus Paris as Vorsitzender des Gerichts
- Theo Shall as Mr. Wood
- Walter Holten as General
- Andrews Engelmann as Russischer Intrigant Trotzky
- Karl Meixner as Senator
- Viktor Afritsch as von Klamm
- Albert Arid as Offizier der russischen Hafenwache
- Karl Hanft as Tony
- Michl Lang as Oberhofen
- Richard Ludwig as Major der russischen Wache
- Philipp Manning as Holm
- Friedrich Ulmer as Dr. Hoffmann
- Paul Wagner as Begleiter des König Maximilian
- Aruth Wartan as Kenwolsky
- Dolf Zenzen as Begleiter Trotzkys am bayerischen Hof

== Bibliography ==
- Bergfelder, Tim & Bock, Hans-Michael. The Concise Cinegraph: Encyclopedia of German. Berghahn Books, 2009.
- Fox, Jo. Film Propaganda in Britain and Nazi Germany: World War II Cinema. Berg, 2007.
- Hadley, Michael L. Count Not the Dead: The Popular Image of the German Submarine. McGill-Queen's University Press, 1995.
- Waldman, Harry. Nazi Films in America, 1933-1942. McFarland, 2008.
