= Here's Berlin =

1932 film

- Directed by: Julien Duvivier
- Written by: Rolf E. Vanloo (novel); Julien Duvivier
- Produced by: Frank Clifford; Hans Henkel; Georges Lourau
- Starring: Josette Day; Germaine Aussey; Wolfgang Klein
- Cinematography: Heinrich Balasch; Max Brink; Reimar Kuntze
- Music by: Karol Rathaus
- Production company: Films Sonores Tobis
- Distributed by: Films Sonores Tobis; Aafa-Film
- Release date: 15 March 1932
- Running time: 89 minutes
- Countries: France; Germany
- Languages: French; German

Here's Berlin or Hello Berlin, Paris Calling (French: Allo Berlin? Ici Paris!, German: Hallo hallo! Hier spricht Berlin!) is a 1932 French-German romantic comedy film directed by Julien Duvivier and starring Josette Day, Germaine Aussey and Wolfgang Klein. It was shot at the Johannisthal Studios in Berlin. The film's sets were designed by the art director Erich Czerwonski.

== Synopsis ==
Lily in Paris and Erich in Berlin are switchboard operators who bond when handling international phone calls. One day Erich decides to visit Paris to finally meet Lily. He is delayed for the rendezvous and complications ensue involving her friend and colleague Annette.

== Cast ==
- Josette Day as Lily
- Germaine Aussey as Annette
- Wolfgang Klein as Erich
- Karel Štěpánek as Max
- Charles Redgie as Jacques Dumont
- Hans Henninger as Karl
- Georges Boulanger as Le président de la république transocéanienne
- Albert Broquin as Le guide
- Heinrich Lisson as Minor Role
- Marthe Mussine
- Pierre Piérade
- Ellen Plessow
- Gustav Püttjer as Le musicien arabe
- Émile Saint-Ober

== Bibliography ==
- Nornes, Markus (2007). Cinema Babel: Translating Global Cinema. University of Minnesota Press. ISBN 978-0-8166-5041-5.
