= The Right to Love (1939 film) =

- Directed by: Joe Stöckel
- Written by: Franz Franchy (play); Erich Ebermayer; Ernst Hesse
- Produced by: Rolf Randolf
- Starring: Magda Schneider; Anneliese Uhlig; Viktor Staal
- Cinematography: Otto Baecker
- Music by: Fritz Wenneis
- Production company: Rolf Randolf-Film
- Release date: 24 November 1939
- Country: Germany
- Language: German

The Right to Love (German: Das Recht auf Liebe) is a 1939 German drama film directed by Joe Stöckel and starring Magda Schneider, Anneliese Uhlig and Viktor Staal. Location shooting took place in the Tyrol.

== Synopsis ==
The daughter of a wealthy landowner is engaged to be married. However, a lowly maid on the estate comes between them, before eventually finding her own happiness with a local forester.

== Cast ==
- Magda Schneider as Vroni Mareiter
- Anneliese Uhlig as Melanie v. Salurn, seine Tochter
- Viktor Staal as Vinzenz Brunner
- Rolf Wanka as Martin Förchinger, sein Förster u. Verwalter
- Paul Wegener as Herr von Salurn, Schloßgutsbesitzer in Tirol
- Josefine Dora as Bärbel, Haushälterin auf Schloß Salurn
- Trude Haefelin as Annamirl, Jungmagd
- Klaus Detlef Sierck as Stefan v. Salurn, sein Sohn
- Rolf Pinegger as Der alte Brunner
- Elise Aulinger as Mutter Brunner
- Heinrich Schroth as Landgerichtsrat Dr. Schneider
- Friedrich Ulmer as Niederegger, Gemeindevorsteher
- Olga Limburg as Frau Langgerichtsrat Dr. Schneider
- Hermann Pfeiffer as Viehhändler Schweighofer
- Erwin Klietsch as Landarzt
- Otto Sauter-Sarto as Oberförster
- Georg H. Schnell as Oberst v. Kettler
- Lotte Spira as Directrice

== Bibliography ==
- Waldman, Harry. Nazi Films In America, 1933-1942. McFarland & Co, 2008.
