= When the Evening Bells Ring (1930 film) =

1930 film

- Actress Maria Minzenti is dressed in traditional Bavarian folk costume
- Directed by: Hanns Beck-Gaden
- Written by: Joseph Dalman; Hanns Beck-Gaden
- Produced by: Georg Zeigler
- Starring: Josef Berger; Rosa Kirchner-Lang; Hanns Beck-Gaden; Franz Loskarn
- Cinematography: Karl Attenberger
- Production company: Georg Ziegler Film
- Distributed by: Leo-Film
- Release date: November 1930
- Country: Germany
- Languages: Silent film German intertitles

When the Evening Bells Ring (German: Wenn die Abendglocken läuten) is a 1930 German silent drama film directed by Hanns Beck-Gaden and starring Josef Berger, Rosa Kirchner-Lang and Hanns Beck-Gaden. It is a heimatfilm set in Bavaria.

== Cast ==
- Josef Berger as Melchner
- Rosa Kirchner-Lang as Seine Frau
- Hanns Beck-Gaden as Hans, beider Sohn
- Franz Loskarn as Michel, beider Sohn
- Maria Mindzenty as Annerl, Pflegekind
- Emmy Kronberg as Saffy, Zigeunerin
- Theo Kasper as Pietro, Zigeuner
- Kaethe Consee as Mosnerwirtin
- Fritz Bernet as Simmerl, Gemeindediener
- Fritz Müller as Ein Vagabund

== Bibliography ==
- Langford, Michelle. Germany: Directory of World Cinema. Intellect Books, 2012.
