= Friedrich Ulmer =

German actor (1877–1952)

- Born: 27 March 1877; Munich, Bavaria; German Empire
- Died: 26 April 1952 (aged 75); Traunstein, Bavaria; West Germany
- Occupation: Film actor
- Years active: 1920–1947

Friedrich Ulmer (1877–1952) was a German film actor.

== Partial filmography ==
- Das schwarze Amulett (1920)
- Der Totenkopf (1920)
- Die Hexe von Lolaruh (1920) as Waldläufer
- A Dying Nation (1922, part 1, 2)
- Helena (1924) as Menelaos
- Waterloo (1929) as Gneisenau
- The Tunnel (1933)
- The Csardas Princess (1934) as Prince Weylersheim
- Hubertus Castle (1934) as Count Egge
- The Old and the Young King (1935) as Von Reichmann
- The Red Rider (1935) as Generaldirektor Livius
- Joan of Arc (1935) as the capitain
- The Saint and Her Fool (1935) as Prince Georg of Brauneck
- The Monastery's Hunter (1935) as Heinrich von Inzing
- Home Guardsman Bruggler (1936) as Hans Oberwexer
- Silence in the Forest (1937) as Conrad Kersten
- The Mountain Calls (1938) as Favre
- Stärker als die Liebe (1938)
- The Right to Love (1939) as Niederegger, Gemeindevorsteher
- A Man Astray (1940) as Der Kommissar
- The Fire Devil (1940) as Reintaler, Kärntner Bauer
- Der Herr im Haus (1940) as Bongelstedt
- The Girl from Barnhelm (1940) as the president of the martial court
- Hochzeitsnacht (1941)
- Carl Peters (1941) as Prince Hohenlohe-Langenberg
- Ohm Krüger (1941) as General Joubert
- Comrades (1941) as Major von Brockdorff
- Secret File W.B.1 (1942) as Dr. Hoffmann
- The War of the Oxen (1943) as Peter Pienzenauer
- Jugendliebe (1947) as Bürgermeister (final film role)
