= Dagfin =

1926 film

- Russian poster
- Directed by: Joe May
- Written by: Werner Scheff (novel); Jane Bess; Adolf Lantz; Joe May; Hans Székely
- Produced by: Joe May
- Starring: Paul Richter; Alfred Gerasch; Marcella Albani
- Cinematography: Carl Drews; Helmar Lerski; Karl Puth; Edgar S. Ziesemer
- Music by: Willy Schmidt-Gentner
- Production companies: May-Film; Phoebus Film
- Distributed by: Phoebus Film
- Release date: 20 December 1926
- Country: Germany
- Languages: Silent; German intertitles

Dagfin is a 1926 German silent film directed and co-written by Joe May and starring Paul Richter, Alfred Gerasch and Marcella Albani.

The film's art direction was by Ernst Schütte and Erich Zander.

== Cast ==
- Paul Richter as Dagfin Holberg, ein Skiführer
- Alfred Gerasch as Axel Boysen
- Marcella Albani as Lydia, seine Frau
- Hedwig Wangel as Ihre Zofe
- Alexander Murski as Oberst von Gain
- Mary Johnson as Tilly, seine Tochter
- Paul Wegener as Sabi Bey, türkischer General
- Nien Soen Ling as Garron, sein Sekretär
- Ernst Deutsch as Assairan, ein Armenier
- Paul Biensfeldt

== Bibliography ==
- Thomas Elsaesser & Michael Wedel. The BFI companion to German cinema. British Film Institute, 1999.
