= Marriage Strike (1935 film) =

1935 film

- German: Ehestreik
- Directed by: Georg Jacoby
- Written by: Julius Pohl (play); Walter Forster; Alois Johannes Lippl
- Produced by: Karl Ritter
- Starring: Trude Marlen; Paul Richter; Erika von Thellmann
- Cinematography: Carl Drews
- Edited by: Wolfgang Becker
- Music by: Ernst Erich Buder; Willy Geisler
- Production company: UFA
- Distributed by: UFA
- Release date: 31 May 1935
- Running time: 85 minutes
- Country: Nazi Germany
- Language: German

Marriage Strike or Matrimonial Strike (German: Ehestreik) is a 1935 German comedy film directed by Georg Jacoby and starring Trude Marlen, Paul Richter and Erika von Thellmann. It was remade in 1953.

The film's sets were designed by the art directors Erich Kettelhut and Max Mellin.

== Cast ==
- Trude Marlen as Hanni
- Paul Richter as Wirt
- Erika von Thellmann as Apollonia
- Oskar Sima as Wurzelhans
- Hermann Erhardt as Bürgermeister
- Heli Finkenzeller as Pepi
- Theodor Danegger as Bartl
- Elise Aulinger as Annamirl
- Beppo Brem as Wimpfinger
- Erna Fentsch as Wimpfingerin
- Viktor Gehring as Zellger
- Irene Kohl as Zellgerin
- Franz Loskarn as Malermeister
- Olga Schaub as Malermeisterin
- Oscar Aigner as Drahmbauer
- Fanny Schreck as Drahmbäuerin
- Paul Luka as Baier
- Karin Luesebrink as Baierin
- Otto Braml as Schubert
- Anny Stäger as Schubertin
- Kurt Meisel as Loisl
- Charlotte Radspieler as Vroni
- Rudolf Vones as Sepp
- Inge Kick as Marai
- Hans Henninger as Rosser
- Liane Kopf as Resl
- Josefine Dora as Köchin
- Marianne Bormann as Zenzi
- Matthias Bogner as Apollonias Sohn
