= Salto Mortale (1953 film) =

1953 West German drama film

- Directed by: Viktor Tourjansky
- Written by: Felix Lützkendorf
- Produced by: Helmuth Schönnenbeck
- Starring: Margot Hielscher; Philip Dorn; Karlheinz Böhm; Paul Kemp
- Cinematography: Erich Claunigk; Konstantin Irmen-Tschet
- Edited by: Anneliese Schönnenbeck
- Music by: Lotar Olias
- Production company: Komet-Film
- Distributed by: Panorama-Film
- Release date: 17 September 1953
- Running time: 90 minutes
- Country: West Germany
- Language: German

Salto Mortale is a 1953 West German drama film directed by Viktor Tourjansky and starring Margot Hielscher, Philip Dorn and Karlheinz Böhm. It was shot at the Bavaria Studios in Munich and at the city's Zirkus Crone. The film's sets were designed by the art directors Hans Kuhnert and Theo Zwierski.

== Synopsis ==
Verena, a trick rider, inherits the circus after the death of her father. However, her father took out a loan before his death and the creditors appoint an outsider, Manfred, as a trustee to watch over the finances. He is entranced by the circus world and he and Verena fall in love, provoking the jealousy of the veteran lion tamer Cadenos.

== Cast ==
- Margot Hielscher as Verena
- Philip Dorn as Cadenos
- Karlheinz Böhm as Manfred
- Paul Kemp as Willi
- Nicolas Koline as Mischa
- Christine Kaufmann as Dascha
- Käthe Itter as Martha
- Erika Remberg as Rita
- Gunnar Möller as Kurt
- Willy Rösner as Direktor Jansen
- Gert Fröbe as Jan
- Angela Cenery as Sekretärin
- Viktor Afritsch
- Peter Alexander as Singer
- Annelise Benz
- Circus Krone
- Sybille Dochtermann
- Werner Fuetterer
- Hildegard Hornauer
- Christl Lazarus
- Leila Negra as Singer
- Karl Schaidler
- Treska
- Uno Myggan Ericson

== Bibliography ==
- Fenner, Angelica. Race under Reconstruction in German Cinema: Robert Stemmle's Toxi. University of Toronto Press, 2011.
- Singer, Michael. Film Directors. Lone Eagle Publishing, 2002.
