= The Monastery's Hunter (1935 film) =

1935 film directed by Max Obal

- Directed by: Max Obal
- Written by: Peter Francke
- Based on: The Monastery's Hunter (novel) by Ludwig Ganghofer
- Starring: Friedrich Ulmer; Paul Richter; Josef Eichheim
- Cinematography: Karl Attenberger
- Edited by: Helene Bursek
- Production company: UFA
- Distributed by: UFA
- Release date: 18 November 1935
- Running time: 83 minutes
- Country: Germany
- Language: German

The Monastery's Hunter (German: Der Klosterjäger) is a 1935 German historical drama film directed by Max Obal and starring Friedrich Ulmer, Paul Richter, and Josef Eichheim. It was based on an 1892 novel of the same title by Ludwig Ganghofer.

The film's sets were designed by the art director Carl Ludwig Kirmse and Hans Kuhnert.

== Cast ==
- Friedrich Ulmer as Heinrich von Inzing
- Paul Richter as Haymo, der Klosterjäger
- Josef Eichheim as Schluttemann, der Vogt
- Hans Rudolf Waldburg as Frater Severin
- Viktor Gehring as Dietwald von Falkenau
- Hansi Thoms as Walti
- Hermann Erhardt as Wolfrat, Lehnsbauer
- Olga Schaub as Josefa, seine Frau
- Charlotte Radspieler as Gittli, Wolfrats Schwester
- Willy Rösner as Der Eggebauer
- Erna Fentsch as Zenza, Tochter des Eggebauern

== See also ==
- The Monastery's Hunter (1920 film)
- The Monastery's Hunter (1953 film)

== Bibliography ==
- Bock, Hans-Michael; Bergfelder, Tim, eds. (2009). The Concise Cinegraph: Encyclopaedia of German Cinema. New York: Berghahn Books. ISBN 978-1-57181-655-9.
