= Young Heart Full of Love =

1953 film

- Directed by: Paul May
- Written by: Lothar Gündisch; Wolf Waehner
- Produced by: Wolf Waehner
- Starring: Heinrich Gretler; Hans Brenner; Lore Frisch
- Cinematography: Walter Riml
- Edited by: Anneliese Schönnenbeck
- Music by: Giuseppe Becce
- Production company: Alpen-Film-Union WolfWahner
- Distributed by: Columbia Film
- Release date: 3 September 1953
- Running time: 94 minutes
- Country: West Germany
- Language: German

Young Heart Full of Love (German: Junges Herz voll Liebe) is a 1953 West German family drama film directed by Paul May and starring Heinrich Gretler, Hans Brenner and Lore Frisch. Much of the film was shot on location in and around Obergurgl and the Ötztal Alps in the Austrian Tyrol.

== Synopsis ==
After losing his parents in an avalanche, a boy becomes devoted to the animals on his farm.

== Cast ==
- Heinrich Gretler as Großvater Moosleitner
- Hans Brenner as Hansi Moosleitner 'Haflingersepp'
- Lore Frisch as Mariele Moosleitner
- Bernhard Wicki as Vitus Zingerl
- Armin Dahlen as Junglehrer Gstreiner
- Rudolf Carl as Altlehrer Sagschnöller
- Paul Hörbiger as Landesstallmeister
- Hermann Kowan as Rauthaler
- Wolf Ackva as Tonio Rossi
- Werner Lieven as Italienischer Wirt
- Leni Gehrig as Sängerin
- Kurt E. Ludwig as Peppo
- Uli Steigberg as Cesare

== Bibliography ==
- John Holmstrom. The Moving Picture Boy: An International Encyclopaedia from 1895 to 1995. Michael Russell, 1996.
