= The Haunted Castle (1936 film) =

1936 film directed by Max Obal

- Directed by: Max Obal
- Written by: Peter Francke; Rudolf Stratz
- Based on: The Haunted Castle by Rudolf Stratz
- Produced by: Peter Ostermayr
- Starring: Walter Steinbeck; Carola Höhn; Hans Stüwe
- Cinematography: Karl Attenberger
- Edited by: Friedel Buckow
- Music by: Friedrich Wilhelm Rust
- Production company: UFA
- Distributed by: UFA
- Release date: 19 March 1936
- Running time: 80 minutes
- Country: Germany
- Language: German

The Haunted Castle (German: Schloß Vogelöd) is a 1936 German mystery film directed by Max Obal and starring Walter Steinbeck, Carola Höhn and Hans Stüwe. It was shot at the Babelsberg Studios in Potsdam and on location around Berlin, Munich and Hinterbrühl in the Isar Valley. The film's sets were designed by the art director Hermann Asmus and Hans Kuhnert. The film is based on the novel of the same title by Rudolf Stratz, which had previously been adapted into 1921 silent film The Haunted Castle. It was one of a number of films from the Weimar Republic remade during the Nazi era.

== Synopsis ==
After returning from a long stay in abroad, Andreas arrives at the family estate only to be wrongly accused of murdering his brother Count Leopold. Andreas had discovered his former sweetheart, Marianne, had married Leopold driven by forged letters and long-standing family feuds. Though a gamekeeper initially confesses to the shooting, a medical examination of Leopold's body reveals he was actually killed by a blow to the head. Ultimately, the culprit is revealed to be the estate's manager, Johann von Safferstätt, who murdered to conceal his embezzlement of the family’s vast wealth.

== Cast ==
- Walter Steinbeck as Leopold, Graf von Vogelöd
- Carola Höhn as Marianne, Gräfin von Vogelöd
- Hans Stüwe as Andreas, Leopolds Bruder
- Käthe Haack as Maly, Baronin von Siebeneich
- Hans Zesch-Ballot as Johann, Graf von Safferstätt
- Erich Dunskus as Christoff von Brauenberg
- Grete Reinwald as Käte von Brauenberg
- Karl Hellmer as Matthias, ein Waldhüter
- Hilde Sessak as Wally, Tochter des Waldhüters
- F.W. Schröder-Schrom as Kriminalrat Kugler
- Hans Adalbert Schlettow as Kriminalassistent Bornemann
- Henri Peters-Arnolds as Franz Salvermoser, Lehrer
- Friedrich Ettel as Dr. Wappold, Kreisarzt
- William Huch as Joseph, Diener

== Bibliography ==
- Goble, Alan. The Complete Index to Literary Sources in Film. Walter de Gruyter, 1999.
- Klaus, Ulrich J. Deutsche Tonfilme: Jahrgang 1936. Klaus-Archiv, 1988.
- Williams, Alan. Film and Nationalism. Rutgers University Press, 2002.
