= The War of the Oxen (1920 film) =

1920 film

- Directed by: Franz Osten
- Written by: Ludwig Ganghofer (novel); Franz Osten
- Cinematography: Franz Planer
- Production company: Bavaria Film
- Release date: 17 October 1920
- Running time: 60 minutes
- Country: Germany
- Languages: Silent; German intertitles

The War of the Oxen (German: Der Ochsenkrieg) is a 1920 German silent historical film directed by Franz Osten. It was made by Bavaria Film at the company's Munich studios. It is based on the 1914 novel The War of the Oxen by Ludwig Ganghofer.

== Cast ==
- Thea Steinbrecher as Jula
- Fritz Greiner
- Carl Dalmonico
- Lia Eibenschütz
- Fritz Kampers
- Ernst Rückert
- Katharina Schratt
- Thelma Votipka

== Bibliography ==
- Goble, Alan. The Complete Index to Literary Sources in Film. Walter de Gruyter, 1999.
