= Karl Skraup =

Austrian actor (1898–1958)

- Born: 31 July 1898; Atzgersdorf, Austria-Hungary
- Died: 2 October 1958 (aged 60); Munich, West Germany
- Occupation: Actor
- Years active: 1933–1958

Karl Skraup (31 July 1898 – 2 October 1958) was an Austrian stage and film actor. From 1947 until his death in 1958 he worked at the Volkstheater in Vienna.

== Selected filmography ==
Year	Title	Role	Notes
1933	Adventures on the Lido		
1934	A Star Fell from Heaven		
1935	The World's in Love		
1935	Suburban Cabaret		
1936	Lumpaci the Vagabond		
1936	Silhouettes		
1936	Court Theatre		
1937	The Charm of La Boheme		
1937	The Eternal Mask		
1938	Thirteen Chairs		
1939	Immortal Waltz		
1939	Linen from Ireland		
1940	Der Herr im Haus		
1940	Mirror of Life		
1941	Love Is Duty Free		
1942	Violanta		
1943	Paracelsus		
1944	The Heart Must Be Silent		
1944	Why Are You Lying, Elisabeth?		
1947	The Millionaire		
1948	The Queen of the Landstrasse		
1948	On Resonant Shores		
1948	The Singing House		
1949	A Heart Beats for You		
1950	Cordula		
1951	Spring on Ice		
1953	The Monastery's Hunter		
1953	Open Your Window		
1953	The Chaplain of San Lorenzo		
1954	Maxie		
1954	Tiefland		
1955	Mozart		
1957	The Saint and Her Fool		
1957	The Winemaker of Langenlois		
1959	The Shepherd from Trutzberg		
1960	Herr Puntila and His Servant Matti		
