= Charlotte Schellhorn =

German actress

- Born: 1922; Germany
- Died: 1945 (aged 22–23); Mallnitz, Germany
- Occupation: Actress
- Years active: 1937–1945 (film)

Charlotte Schellhorn (1922–1945) was a German film actress. She committed suicide at the age of twenty three, having appeared in thirteen films.

== Selected filmography ==
- The Muzzle (1938)
- What Now, Sibylle? (1938)
- Der singende Tor (1939)
- Between River and Steppe (1939)
- Who's Kissing Madeleine? (1939)
- Left of the Isar, Right of the Spree (1940)
- The Swedish Nightingale (1941)

== Bibliography ==
- Goble, Alan. The Complete Index to Literary Sources in Film. Walter de Gruyter, 1999.
