= At Blonde Kathrein's Place (1934 film) =

1934 film directed by Franz Seitz

- Directed by: Franz Seitz
- Written by: Joseph Dalman; Joe Stöckel
- Produced by: Franz Seitz
- Starring: Liane Haid; Thea Aichbichler; Fred Hennings
- Cinematography: Franz Koch
- Edited by: Ella Ensink
- Music by: Leo Leux
- Production company: Bavaria Film
- Distributed by: Bavaria Film
- Release date: 29 June 1934
- Running time: 84 minutes
- Country: Germany
- Language: German

At Blonde Kathrein's Place (German: Bei der blonden Kathrein) is a 1934 German comedy film directed by Franz Seitz and starring Liane Haid, Thea Aichbichler and Fred Hennings. It was shot at the Bavaria Studios in Munich and on location around Würzburg. The film's sets were designed by the art director Max Seefelder. It was loosely remade as a 1959 film of the same title.

== Synopsis ==
In Würzburg the student Leopold is infatuated with Kathrein the proprietor of the Golden Goose inn. Her aunt attempts to try and block any romance between them by writing to the boy's father, but in fact Kathrein is really in love with Stefan, the inn's cellar master.

== Cast ==
- Liane Haid as Kathrein Hohenadel, Wirtin zur Goldenen Gans
- Thea Aichbichler as Minna Fromm, ihre Tante
- Fred Hennings as Stefan Birkmeier, Kellermeister der Goldenen Gans
- Joe Stöckel as Valentin Ruhland, Apotheker
- Margarete Kupfer as Konstanze Ruhland, seine Frau
- Rolf von Goth as Leopld, beider Sohn, Korpsstudent
- Philipp Weichand as Knöpflein, Korpsdiener
- Gustl Gstettenbaur as Der Kellnerjunge in der Goldenen Gans
- Walter Lantzsch as Professor
- Josef Eichheim as Notar

== Bibliography ==
- Frank, Stefanie Mathilde. Wiedersehen im Wirtschaftswunder: Remakes von Filmen aus der Zeit des Nationalsozialismus in der Bundesrepublik 1949–1963. V&R Unipress, 2017.
- Klaus, Ulrich J. Deutsche Tonfilme: Jahrgang 1934. Klaus-Archiv, 1988.
- Waldman, Harry. Nazi Films in America, 1933-1942. McFarland, 2008.
