= Lore Frisch =

German actress

Lore Frisch (1925, Schwindegg – 1962, Potsdam) was a German actress.

== Selected filmography ==
- The Blue and White Lion (1952)
- Young Heart Full of Love (1953)
- Marriage Strike (1953)
- 52 Weeks Make A Year (1955)
- The Czar and the Carpenter (1956)
- My Wife Makes Music (1958)
- The Dress (1961)
