= Josef Eichheim =

German actor (1888–1945)

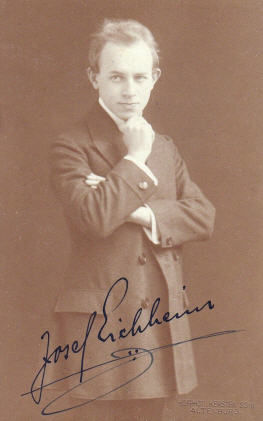
- Eichheim c. 1920
- Born: Josef Theodor Ludwig Eichheim; 23 February 1888; Munich, Bavaria, German Empire
- Died: 13 November 1945 (aged 57); Gars am Inn, Bavaria, Allied-occupied Germany
- Occupation: Film actor
- Years active: 1915–1945

Josef Theodor Ludwig Eichheim (23 February 1888 – 13 November 1945) was a German film actor.

== Selected filmography ==
- I Lost My Heart in Heidelberg (1926)
- The Women's War (1928)
- Behind Monastery Walls (1928)
- The Girl with a Good Reputation (1938)
- Peter Voss, Thief of Millions (1932)
- Kiki (1932)
- Night of Temptation (1932)
- S.A.-Mann Brand (1933)
- A Woman Like You (1933)
- Must We Get Divorced? (1933)
- The Love Hotel (1933)
- The Tunnel (1933)
- The Legacy of Pretoria (1934)
- At Blonde Kathrein's Place (1934)
- The Switched Bride (1934)
- Between Heaven and Earth (1934)
- Little Dorrit (1934)
- The Tannhof Women (1934)
- The Double (1934)
- Knockout (1935)
- The Blonde Carmen (1935)
- The King's Prisoner (1935)
- The Monastery's Hunter (1935)
- The Hunter of Fall (1936)
- Street Music (1936)
- A Doctor of Conviction (1936)
- The Unsuspecting Angel (1936)
- The Voice of the Heart (1937)
- Meiseken (1937)
- Gordian the Tyrant (1937)
- The Ways of Love Are Strange (1937)
- Serenade (1937)
- Storms in May (1938)
- Frau Sixta (1938)
- Fools in the Snow (1938)
- Three Wonderful Days (1939)
- The Sinful Village (1940)
- Left of the Isar, Right of the Spree (1940)
- Roses in Tyrol (1940)
- Venus on Trial (1941)
- Love is Duty Free (1941)
- The Little Residence (1942)
- Kohlhiesel's Daughters (1943)
- Johann (1943)
- Wild Bird (1943)
- Melody of a Great City (1943)
- The Dark Day (1943)
- Music in Salzburg (1944)
- The Court Concert (1948)
