= A Dying Nation =

1922 film directed by Robert Reinert

- German: Sterbende Völker
- Directed by: Robert Reinert
- Written by: Robert Reinert
- Produced by: Gabriel Pascal; Robert Reinert
- Starring: Paul Wegener; Otto Gebühr; Fritz Kortner
- Cinematography: Hans Bloch; Ewald Daub; Karl Hasselmann; Carl Hoffmann; Alfredo Lenci; Helmar Lerski; Ludwig Zahn
- Production company: Monumental-Film
- Release dates: 24 November 1922 (Part I); 6 December 1922 (Part II)
- Country: Germany
- Languages: Silent; German intertitles

A Dying Nation or Dying Peoples (German: Sterbende Völker) is a 1922 German silent historical drama film directed by Robert Reinert and starring Paul Wegener, Otto Gebühr, and Fritz Kortner. It was released in two parts: Heimat in Not and Brennendes Meer.

The film's sets were designed by the art directors Kurt Dürnhöfer and Walter Reimann. It was shot at the Bavaria Studios in Munich. The film appears to be lost.

== Cast ==
- Paul Wegener
- Otto Gebühr
- Fritz Kortner
- Aud Egede-Nissen
- Luigi Serventi
- Frida Richard
- Loni Nest
- Robert Leffler
- Ruth Weyher
- Paul Burgen
- Maria Caan
- Conrad Cappes
- Ida Hacker
- Kurt Holm
- Inga Krafft
- Friedrich Kühne
- Helena Makowska
- Solveigh Mellin
- Gabriel Pascal
- Fritz Richard
- Gustavo Serena
- Thea Steinbrecher
- Friedrich Ulmer
- Toni Wittels

== Bibliography ==
- Elsaesser, Thomas; Wedel, Michael, eds. (1996). A Second Life: German Cinema's First Decades. Amsterdam: Amsterdam University Press. ISBN 978-90-5356-172-0.
