= Peter Ostermayr =

German film director

- Born: 18 July 1882; Mühldorf, Bavaria; German Empire
- Died: 7 May 1967 (aged 84); Munich, Bavaria; West Germany
- Occupations: Producer; Director
- Years active: 1907–1959

Peter Ostermayr (18 July 1882 – 7 May 1967) was a German film producer, screenwriter and film director. Ostermayr was a pioneer during the early years of German cinema, with his brothers Franz Osten and Ottmar Ostermayr. In 1907 they took over their father's photography business and turned into a film studio. After serving in the First World War he founded a company which later evolved into Bavaria Film, and acquired the Emelka Studios in Munich. While Bavaria went on to become a leading German production company, Ostermayr had left by the mid-1920s and worked at several other studios including the giant UFA.

Following the Second World War he entered independent production, and specialized in heimatfilm. He was made an honorary president of the West German Film Producers' Association. He had two sons, John and Paul born in 1908 and 1909 respectively, and a daughter Olga who was born in 1918. His son was the film director Paul May.

== Filmography as producer ==
- Trutzi from Trutzberg (1922) (also director)
- To a Woman of Honour (1924)
- The Csardas Princess (1927)
- Volga Volga (1928)
- The Lady in Black (1928)
- Napoleon at Saint Helena (1929)
- The Peak Scaler (1933)
- Holiday From Myself (1934)
- Hubertus Castle (1934)
- The Saint and Her Fool (1935)
- Militiaman Bruggler (1936)
- The Haunted Castle (1936)
- The Hunter of Fall (1936)
- Storms in May (1938)
- Frau Sixta (1938)
- Left of the Isar, Right of the Spree (1940)
- Violanta (1942)
- The War of the Oxen (1943)
- Why Are You Lying, Elisabeth? (1944)
- The Violin Maker of Mittenwald (1950)
- The Cloister of Martins (1951)
- Marriage Strike (1953)
- The Monastery's Hunter (1953)
- Hubertus Castle (1954)
- The Vulture Wally (1956)

== Bibliography ==
- Bock, Hans-Michael & Bergfelder, Tim. The Concise CineGraph. Encyclopedia of German Cinema. Berghahn Books, 2009.
