= Why Are You Lying, Elisabeth? =

1944 film

- Directed by: Fritz Kirchhoff
- Written by: J. Schneider-Foerstl (novel); Gerhard T. Buchholz
- Produced by: Peter Ostermayr
- Starring: Carola Höhn; Paul Richter; Annie Rosar
- Cinematography: Willi Peter Block
- Edited by: Hans Domnick
- Music by: Ludwig Schmidseder
- Production company: UFA
- Distributed by: Deutsche Filmvertriebs
- Release date: 4 August 1944
- Running time: 82 minutes
- Country: Germany
- Language: German

Why Are You Lying, Elisabeth? (German: Warum lügst Du, Elisabeth?) is a 1944 German comedy film directed by Fritz Kirchhoff and starring Carola Höhn, Paul Richter and Annie Rosar. It was shot at the Tempelhof Studios in Berlin and on location in Vienna and Semmering in Austria. The film's sets were designed by the art director Carl Ludwig Kirmse.

== Cast ==
- Carola Höhn as Elisabeth Ponholzer i.e.Lena Rodien
- Paul Richter as Lex Brandner, Caretaker at Lärchenhof
- Annie Rosar as Katrin, Cook
- Hansi Wendler as 'Gaby' Gabriele Benzinger
- Walter Janssen as Leopold Dirk
- Gertrud Wolle as Walburga
- Erika Glässner as Clementine Soest
- Hans Adalbert Schlettow as Ernst Stadinger
- Karl Skraup as Amtsvorsteher Stolp
- Heinz Himmel as Alois Kolbe
- Wilma Tatzel as Gretl
- Ernst Reitter as Josef
- Stefanie Gutenthaler as Liesl

== Bibliography ==
- Klaus, Ulrich J. Deutsche Tonfilme: Jahrgang 1944. Klaus-Archiv, 1988.
- Kreimeier, Klaus. The Ufa Story: A History of Germany's Greatest Film Company, 1918-1945. University of California Press, 1999.
- Rentschler, Eric. The Ministry of Illusion: Nazi Cinema and Its Afterlife. Harvard University Press, 1996.
