= The Monastery's Hunter (1920 film) =

1920 film

- Directed by: Franz Osten
- Written by: Ludwig Ganghofer (novel)
- Starring: Fritz Greiner; Thea Steinbrecher; Toni Wittels
- Cinematography: Franz Planer
- Release date: 1920
- Running time: 70 minutes
- Country: Germany
- Languages: Silent; German intertitles

The Monastery's Hunter (German: Der Klosterjäger) is a 1920 German silent historical drama film directed by Franz Osten and starring Fritz Greiner, Thea Steinbrecher and Toni Wittels. It is based on the 1892 novel of the same title by Ludwig Ganghofer.

== Cast ==
- Fritz Greiner as Wolfrat Polzer
- Thea Steinbrecher as Gittli
- Toni Wittels as Sepha
- Carl Dalmonico as Probst Heinrich von Inzing
- Viktor Gehring as Klosterjäger Haymo
- F.W. Schröder-Schrom as Pater Desertus - Graf Dietwald
- Hans Außfelder as Klostervogt
- Curt Gerdes as Der Eggebauer
- Hildegard Wall as Zenza
- Stuart Josef Lutz as Bildschnitzer Ulei
- Ferdinand Martini as Klostergärtner Frater Severin
- Molly Albrecht as Klosterbub Walti

== See also ==
- The Monastery's Hunter (1935)
- The Monastery's Hunter (1953)

== Bibliography ==
- Bock, Hans-Michael & Bergfelder, Tim. The Concise Cinegraph: Encyclopaedia of German Cinema. Berghahn Books, 2009.
