= Hans Henninger =

German actor (1905–1937)

- Born: 24 February 1905; Pforzheim, Baden-Württemberg, German Empire
- Died: 15 May 1937 (aged 32); Berlin, Nazi Germany
- Occupation: Film actor
- Years active: 1932 - 1937

Hans Henninger (24 February 1905 – 15 May 1937) was a German stage and film actor.

== Life ==
Born in Pforzheim, Henninger had a brief career in film. He frequented Richard Schultz's salon in Charlottenburg. A homosexual, he committed suicide in 1937 shortly before he was to be rounded up by the Gestapo.

== Selected filmography ==
- Here's Berlin (1932)
- Traum von Schönbrunn (1932)
- Sacred Waters (1932)
- Here's Berlin (1932)
- Hermine and the Seven Upright Men (1935)
- Marriage Strike (1935)
- Winter Night's Dream (1935)
- Anschlag auf Schweda (1935)
- Family Parade (1936)
- The Traitor (1936)
- The Hunter of Fall (1936)
- Dangerous Crossing (1937)
- Such Great Foolishness (1937)
