= The War of the Oxen (novel) =

1914 novel by Ludwig Ganghofer

- Author: Ludwig Ganghofer
- Language: German
- Genre: Historical
- Publication date: 1914
- Publication place: Germany
- Media type: Print

The War of the Oxen (German: Der Ochsenkrieg) is a 1914 historical novel by the German writer Ludwig Ganghofer. It is a drama set against the backdrop of the War of the Oxen in the 1420s.

The novel has been adapted on three occasions:

- The War of the Oxen (1920 film), a silent film adaptation
- The War of the Oxen (1943 film), a film adaptation
- The War of the Oxen (TV series), a 1987 television adaptation

== Bibliography ==
- Goble, Alan. The Complete Index to Literary Sources in Film. Walter de Gruyter, 1999.
- Nemoianu, Virgil. Postmodernism and Cultural Identities: Conflicts and Coexistence. CUA Press, 2010.
