= Rolf Pinegger =

German actor (1873–1957)

- Born: 25 March 1873; Schwifting, Bavaria; German Empire
- Died: 18 October 1957 (aged 84); Munich, Bavaria; West Germany
- Occupations: Film actor Stage actor

Rolf Pinegger (25 March 1873 – 18 October 1957) was a German stage and film actor who appeared in over forty films, generally in supporting roles.

== Career ==
Pinegger began his stage career in 1892 at the Stadttheater in Budweis and subsequently performed at theatres in Sigmaringen and Pforzheim. He was associated with the Münchner Volkstheater, where he also held positions including Oberspielleiter and deputy director.

In addition to his theatre work, Pinegger is documented as having served as Spielleitung for the one-act comic play Die verschlafene Kirchenwacht (Bauernspiel) in a Munich radio programme listing.

Pinegger also appeared in German film productions, including the historical film Andreas Hofer - Der Freiheitskampf des Tiroler Volkes (1929), in which he portrayed the role of the Gasteiger innkeeper.

According to the Deutsches Theater-Lexikon, after 1945 Pinegger appeared only in film.

== Selected filmography ==
- The Dying Salome (1919)
- The Last Shot (1920)
- The Blame (1924)
- Behind Monastery Walls (1928)
- The Foreign Legionnaire (1928)
- Andreas Hofer (1929)
- White Majesty (1934)
- The Hunter of Fall (1936)
- Home Guardsman Bruggler (1936)
- Frau Sixta (1938)
- Storms in May (1938)
- The Right to Love (1939)
- Wally of the Vultures (1940)
- The War of the Oxen (1943)
- The Disturbed Wedding Night (1950)
- The Violin Maker of Mittenwald (1950)
- Kissing Is No Sin (1950)
- The Cloister of Martins (1951)
- The Monastery's Hunter (1953)
- My Sweetheart Is from Tyrol (1958)
- Black Forest Cherry Schnapps (1958)

== Bibliography ==
- Richards, Jeffrey. Visions of Yesterday. Routledge, 1973.

== Legacy ==
A street in Munich, Rolf-Pinegger-Straße, was named in his honour. The designation is recorded from 1964.
