= Storms in May (novel) =

1904 novel by Ludwig Ganghofer

- Author: Ludwig Ganghofer
- Language: German
- Genre: Drama
- Publisher: Adolf Bonz, Stuttgart
- Publication date: 1904
- Publication place: Germany
- Media type: Print

Storms in May (German: Gewitter im Mai) is a 1904 novel by the German writer Ludwig Ganghofer.

== Adaptations ==
It has been adapted twice for film. A 1920 silent film Storms in May and a 1938 sound film Storms in May directed by Hans Deppe and starring Viktor Staal and Hansi Knoteck. A 1987 television film with Claudia Messner and Gabriel Barylli was directed by Xaver Schwarzenberger.

== Bibliography ==
- Goble, Alan. The Complete Index to Literary Sources in Film. Walter de Gruyter, 1999.
