= The Monastery's Hunter (novel) =

1892 novel

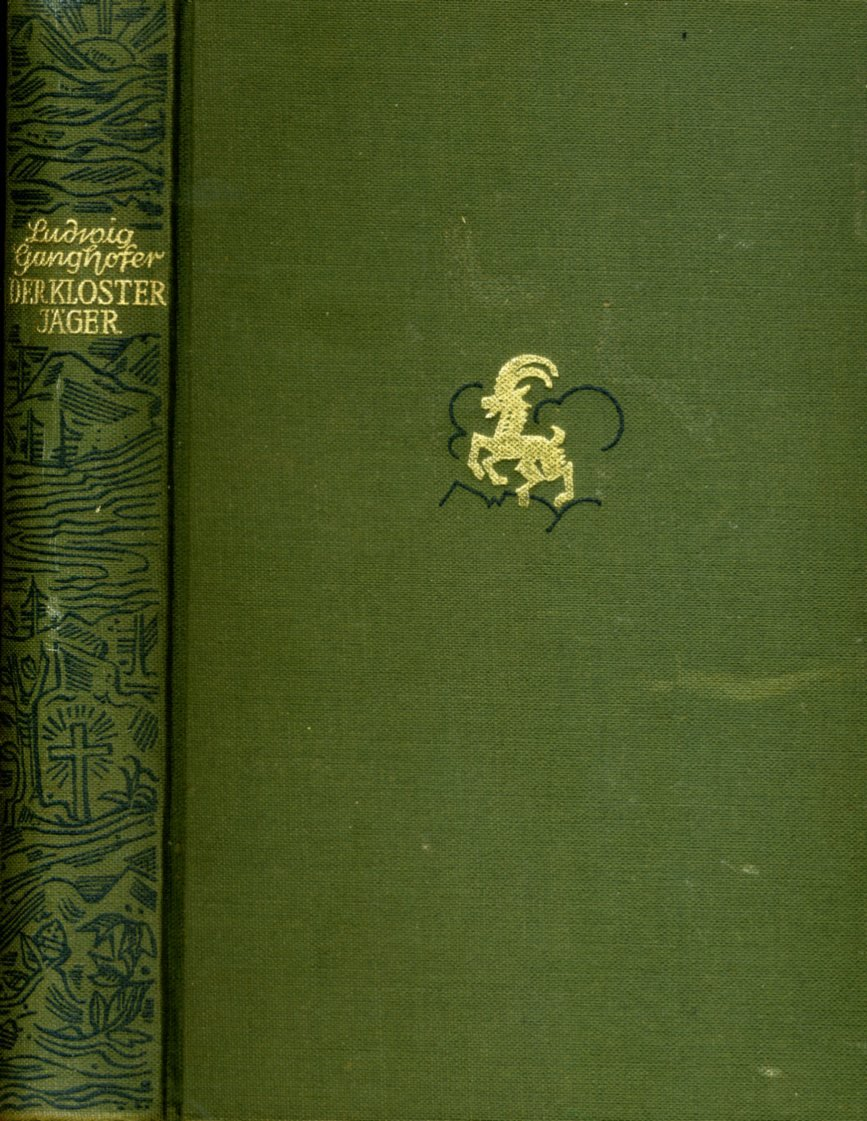
- Der Klosterjäger (1917 edition)
- Author: Ludwig Ganghofer
- Language: German
- Genre: Drama
- Publication date: 1892
- Publication place: German Empire
- Media type: Print

The Monastery's Hunter (German: Der Klosterjäger) is an 1892 historical novel written by the German novelist Ludwig Ganghofer. It is set in Bavaria in the fourteenth century.

It has been turned into films three times, a 1920 German silent, a 1935 German sound film and a 1953 West German film.

== Bibliography ==
- Goble, Alan (1999). The Complete Index to Literary Sources in Film. Walter de Gruyter. ISBN 978-3-11-095194-3.
