= Paul May =

German film director (1909–1976)

- Born: 8 May 1909; Munich, German Empire
- Died: 25 February 1976 (aged 66); Taufkirchen, West Germany
- Occupations: Film director, film editor
- Years active: 1935-1972

Paul May (8 May 1909 – 25 February 1976) was a German film director and editor. He directed 40 films between 1935 and 1972.

== Biography ==
He was the son of Peter Ostermayr, a film producer with Universum Film AG, and his wife Olga, née Wernhard. After secondary school in Feldkirch, he entered to film industry and trained in film laboratory work. He became a film editor in 1930 and assistant director in 1935. His first film as director was Edelweißkönig, in 1938.

After the Second World War, he adopted the pseudonym Paul May. His greatest successes were 08/15 (1954), The Forests Sing Forever (1959), Via Mala (1961) from the book by John Knittel, and Scotland Yard Hunts Dr. Mabuse (1963) with Peter van Eyck. He also directed for television. He directed more than forty films between 1935 and 1972.

== Selected filmography ==
=== Editor ===
- Cadets (1931)
- Panic in Chicago (1931)
- Shooting Festival in Schilda (1931)
- The Spanish Fly (1931)
- The Champion Shot (1932)
- The Tsar's Diamond (1932)
- Secret of the Blue Room (1932)
- The Peak Scaler (1933)
- When the Village Music Plays on Sunday Nights (1933)
- William Tell (1934)
- Holiday From Myself (1934)
- The Four Musketeers (1934)
- Peter, Paul and Nanette (1935)
- Miracle of Flight (1935)
- Home Guardsman Bruggler (1936)
- The Hunter of Fall (1936)
- His Best Friend (1937)
- Triad (1938)
- Frau Sixta (1938)
- Storms in May (1938)

=== Screenwriter ===
- Night of the Twelve (1949)

=== Director ===
==== Film ====
- 1939: Der Edelweißkönig
- 1939: Waldrausch
- 1940: Beates Flitterwoche / Sonderbare Flitterwochen
- 1940: Left of the Isar, Right of the Spree
- 1942: Violanta (also co-script)
- 1943: Die unheimliche Wandlung des Alex Roscher
- 1949: Duel with Death (also script); Prod. G. W. Pabst
- 1950: King for One Night (also producer)
- 1952: Two People
- 1953: Young Heart Full of Love
- 1954: 08/15
- 1954: The Phantom of the Big Tent
- 1955: Doctor Solm
- 1955: 08/15 – Part 2
- 1955: 08/15 at Home
- 1956: Weil du arm bist, mußt du früher sterben
- 1957: Weißer Holunder
- 1957: Flucht in die Tropennacht
- 1957: The Fox of Paris
- 1958: Die Landärztin
- 1959: The Forests Sing Forever
- 1959: Heimat, deine Lieder
- 1960: Der Schleier fiel
- 1960: Headquarters State Secret
- 1961: Via Mala
- 1961: Freddy and the Millionaire
- 1962: Waldrausch
- 1963: Barras heute
- 1963: Scotland Yard Hunts Dr. Mabuse
- 1967: Midsummer Night

==== Television ====
- 1964: Die Truhe — (based on a play by James Liggat and Alan Reeve-Jones)
- 1965: Die Schlüssel (TV miniseries) — (remake of Francis Durbridge's The Desperate People, 1963)
- 1965: Glück in Frankreich — (based on a story by Ernst von Salomon)
- 1965: Acht Stunden Zeit — (based on a play by Charles Maître)
- 1966: Melissa (TV miniseries) — (remake of Francis Durbridge's Melissa, 1964)
- 1967: In Sachen Erzberger gegen Helfferich — (screenplay by Axel Eggebrecht)
- 1967–1968: Sherlock Holmes (TV series) — (remake of Sherlock Holmes, 1965)
- 1968: Eine Gefangene bei Stalin und Hitler — (based on Under Two Dictators by Margarete Buber-Neumann)
- 1969–1972: Königlich Bayerisches Amtsgericht (TV series, 7 episodes)
- 1969: Nennen Sie mich Alex — (film about Oleg Penkovsky)
- 1970: Theatergarderobe (TV series)
- 1971: Die Schrott-Story
- 1971–1972: Fünf Tage hat die Woche (TV series)
- 1972: Nicht Lob – noch Furcht. Graf Galen, Bischof von Münster — (screenplay by Luise Rinser)
- 1972–1975: Im Auftrag von Madame (TV series, 32 episodes)
