= Franziska Kinz =

Austrian actress

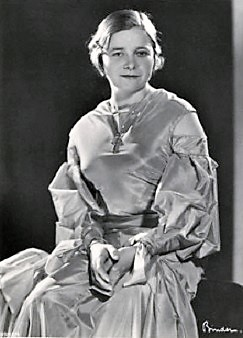
Franziska Kinz

Franziska Kinz (21 February 1897, Kufstein, Austria-Hungary (now Austria) – 26 April 1980, Meran, Italy) was an Austrian film actress.

== Filmography ==
Year	Title	Role	Notes
1929	Diary of a Lost Girl	Meta	
1930	Father and Son	Mrs. Markurell	
1932	Rasputin, Demon with Women	Dunja	
1932	Tannenberg	Frau Puchheiten	
1933	Hitlerjunge Quex	Krankenschwester (nurse)	
1933	Refugees	Pregnant Woman	
1934	Wilhelm Tell	Gertrud Stauffacher	
1934	Eine Siebzehnjährige	Annemarie, dessen Frau	
1935	Mazurka	Mother	
1936	Home Guardsman Bruggler	Mutter Bruggler	
1937	An Enemy of the People	Johanna Stockmann	
1938	Frau Sixta	Frau Sixta	
1940	Aus erster Ehe	Barbara Rohn	
1940	Im Schatten des Berges	Anna, Margrets Schwester	
1941	The Waitress Anna	Anna Rottner	
1944	Nora	Helene Helmer	
1945	Wir sehn uns wieder	Marthe Bichler - Häuslerin	
1950	The Violin Maker of Mittenwald	Posthalterin	
1952	Die schöne Tölzerin	Die Öffelin	
1953	Christina	Frau Anna Stauffer	
1953	Heartbroken on the Moselle	Maria Klaus	
1955	Doctor Solm	Oberschwester Innocenzia	
1955	Das Mädchen vom Pfarrhof	Wirtschafterin Brigitte	
1955	Die Försterbuben	Apollonia, seine Frau	
1956	Bademeister Spargel	Agnes Spargel	
1956	Beichtgeheimnis	Trude Michaelis	
1956	The Story of Anastasia	Herzogin von Leuchtenberg	
1956	Das Hirtenlied vom Kaisertal	Katharina, seine Frau	
1958	An American in Salzburg	Fräulein Murr	
1958	Night Nurse Ingeborg	Oberschwester Mathilde	
1958	...und nichts als die Wahrheit	Ursula Züger, Krankenschwester	
1959	The Shepherd from Trutzberg	Angela von Trutzberg	
1959	Mein ganzes Herz ist voll Musik	Frau Rabitz	
1959	La Vache et le Prisonnier	La Mere d'Helga	
1959	Lass mich am Sonntag nicht allein	Frau Müller	
1960	Der Schleier fiel	Mother	

== Bibliography ==
- Kester, Bernadette. Film Front Weimar: Representations of the First World War in German films of the Weimar Period (1919-1933). Amsterdam University Press, 2003.
