= Karl Attenberger =

German cinematographer (1885–1951)

- Born: 28 October 1885
- Died: 19 November 1951 (aged 66)
- Citizenship: Germany
- Occupation: Cinematographer

Karl Attenberger (28 October 1885 – 19 November 1951) was a German cinematographer. He worked with Leni Riefenstahl on the 1935 propaganda documentary Triumph of the Will.

== Selected filmography ==
- The Face Removed (1920)
- The Favourite of the Queen (1922)
- Son of the Gods (1922)
- Christopher Columbus (1923)
- To a Woman of Honour (1924)
- The Adventurous Wedding (1925)
- The Searching Soul (1925)
- Superfluous People (1926)
- The Villa in Tiergarten Park (1927)
- Poor Little Colombine (1927)
- Klettermaxe (1927)
- The Lady in Black (1928)
- Give Me Life (1928)
- Children's Tragedy (1928)
- Andreas Hofer (1929)
- Der Grenzjäger (1930)
- When the Evening Bells Ring (1930)
- The Peak Scaler (1933)
- Hubertus Castle (1934)
- The Monastery's Hunter (1935)
- Home Guardsman Bruggler (1936)
- The Haunted Castle (1936)
- The Hunter of Fall (1936)
- Storms in May (1938)
- Der rettende Engel (1940)
- Frau Holle (1948)

== Bibliography ==
- Rother, Rainer & Bott, Martin H. Leni Riefenstahl: The Seduction of Genius.Continuum International Publishing 2003.
