= Militiaman Bruggler =

1936 German war film

Home Guardsman Bruggler
- Directed by: Werner Klingler
- Written by: Anton Graf Bossi-Fedrigotti (novel); Joseph Dalman
- Produced by: Peter Ostermayr
- Starring: Ludwig Kerscher; Franziska Kinz; Rolf Pinegger; Eduard Köck
- Cinematography: Alexander von Lagorio; Karl Attenberger; Sepp Allgeier
- Edited by: Paul May
- Music by: Herbert Windt
- Production company: Universum Film AG
- Distributed by: Universum Film AG
- Release date: 28 August 1936
- Country: Germany
- Language: German

Home Guardsman Bruggler (German: Standschütze Bruggler) is a 1936 German war film directed by Werner Klingler and starring Ludwig Kerscher, Franziska Kinz and Rolf Pinegger. It is set in the Tyrol during the First World War and depicts the activities of the local home guard unit. It was based on a novel by Anton Graf Bossi-Fedrigotti, itself based on the diary of the titular Anton Bruggler. Location shooting took place in the Dolomites.

== Cast and characters ==
- Ludwig Kerscher as Toni Bruggler
- Franziska Kinz as Mother Bruggler
- Rolf Pinegger as Grandfather Bruggler
- Eduard Köck as Anderl Theissbacher
- Viktor Gehring as Waldemar
- Friedrich Ulmer as Hans Oberwexer
- Beppo Brem as Jorgl Trimml
- Lola Chlud as Countess von Teuff
- Gustl Gstettenbaur as Bartl Theissbacher
- Hans Hanauer as Sepp Thaler
- Fritz Hofbauer as Sebastian Mutschechner
- Willy Schultes as Hannes Baumgartner

== Bibliography ==
- Richards, Jeffrey (1973). Visions of Yesterday. Routledge & K. Paul. ISBN 978-0-7100-7576-5.
- Schlatter Binswanger, Georg H. (2001). "Bossi-Fedrigotti von Ochsenfeld". In Wilhelm Kosch; et al. (eds.). Deutsches Literaturlexikon. Das 20. Jahrhundert. Vol. 3: Blaas - Braunfels. Walter de Gruyter. pp. 1952–1953. ISBN 978-3-11-096113-3.
- Stimpfl, Oswald (2011). Reiseführer Dolomiten. Mair Dumont Marco Polo. ISBN 978-3-8297-0396-3.
