= Rudolf Greinz =

Austrian writer (1866–1942)

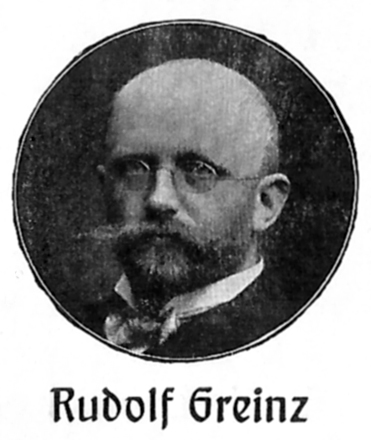
Porträt Rudolf Greinz

Rudolf Greinz (August 16, 1866 – August 16, 1942) was an Austrian writer. He was born as the eldest of five children of Anton Greinz and his wife Maria (née Kapferer). His younger brothers Hugo (1873–1946) and Hermann (1879–1938) were also writers. In 1879 the family moved to Salzburg; his father had been transferred there.

In 1883 Rudolf Greinz laid on the k.k. State Gymnasium in Salzburg from the Matura. He then studied German language and literature, Classical Philology and art history at the Universities of Graz and Innsbruck. Due to illness, Greinz had to give up his intended scientific career and decided to become a writer. As a freelance writer he settled in Merano.

In Meran, Rudolf Greinz met Zoe Basevi, a native of a significant Jewish-British family, the daughter of a retired naval officer living there, a grandniece of the English statesman Benjamin Disraeli. They married in 1899. In 1905 he moved with his family to Innsbruck. There he worked on the magazine Der Föhn, together with Richard Wilhelm Polifka, Rudolf Brix and Franz Kranewitter. His contributions, however, increasingly met with criticism and rejection of his fellow writers, which is why he relocated to Munich in 1911. There he worked under the pseudonym "Tuifelemaler Kassian Kluibenschädel" at the magazine Jugend.

In 1934 his wife Zoe died. Two years later, Rudolf Greinz moved to Ansitz Rosenegg in Aldrans, a village above Innsbruck. He acquired the "Villa Rosenegg" in 1926, but initially used it only as a summer resort. Numerous travels took him to poetry readings throughout the German-speaking world. In 1939 Greinz submitted his application for admission to the Reichsschrifttumskammer, which was retroactively granted on July 1, 1938.

Rudolf Greinz died on his 76th birthday. His tomb is located in the cemetery in Ampass.

== Writings ==
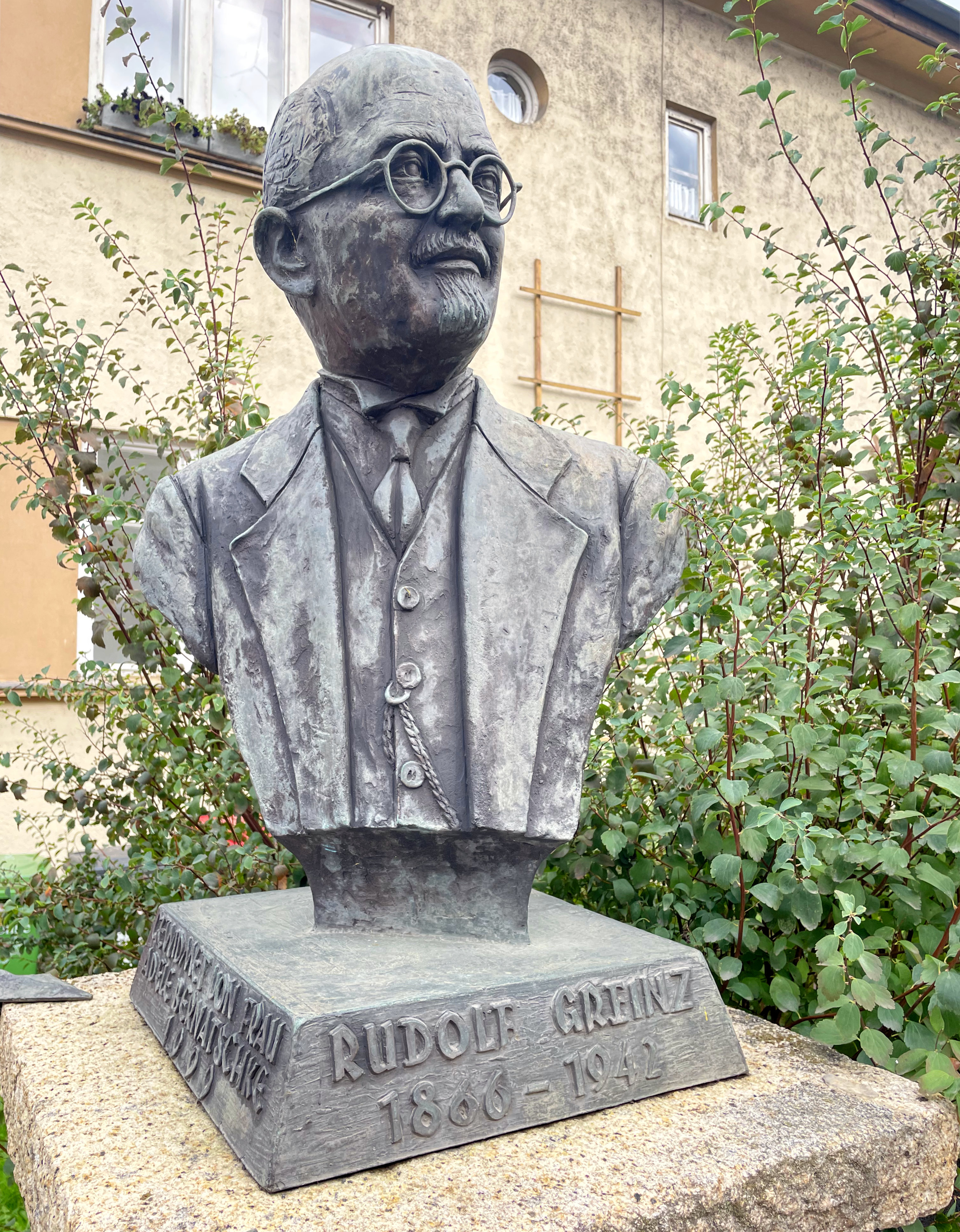
Bust of Rudolf Greinz in Innsbruck (2023)

The early work of Rudolf Greinz recalls Ludwig Thoma. Greinz became known above all for his novels, especially for historical novels. Like Rudolf Greinz himself, many of his fictional characters are deeply religious. His relationship to the church, however, had always been ambivalent. In his writings he held higher clerics before the following of Jesus not befitting lifestyle and the departure of the poor and simple people. Critical to the church is, for example, his 1915 published novel "Äbtissin Verena".

Since 1912 his books have been published by Ludwig Staackmann in Leipzig. Alfred Staackmann, the publisher, was connected to Greinz as a friend and literary advisor. Almost every year, Greinz presented a new novel, a collection of short stories and/or a new stage play. In total, Greinz published 132 books in his lifetime, with new editions not counting. A contemporary, much-read literary leader called him "smug", but not completely incorrect – a "commoner, the poetry, peasant stories and popular dramas only from the sleeve". His books reached – in total – a million edition. His novel Allerseelen alone was sold more than 100,000 times. Greinz was especially outside of Austria, among his readers in Germany and the United States, as the typical representative of the native-connected, down-to-earth literature in Tyrol.

The estate of Rudolf Greinz is administered by the Universität Innsbruck.

Together with his uncle Josef August Kapferer, Rudolf Greinz published the tapes "Tiroler Volkslieder" and "Tiroler Schnadahüpfeln" in two episodes from 1889, first at the Liebeskind publishing house in Leipzig and later at Cotta in Stuttgart. They are among the first prints with songs from Tyrolean tradition.

== Honors ==
- During his lifetime, the city of Innsbruck named the Rudolf-Greinz-Strasse in Pradl after him.
- Since 1955, the "Greinzgasse" in Vienna Danube City (22nd district) commemorates him.
- In the Carinthian field on the lake, where Greinz repeatedly stayed, there is a "Rudolf-Greinz" path.

== Works (selection) ==
=== Novels ===
- Der Herrenschreiber von Hall. Eine Tiroler Geschichte aus dem 16. Jahrhundert (1895)
- Die Rose von Altspaur. Eine Tiroler Geschichte aus dem 15. Jahrhundert (1896)
- Der Herr Expositus. Eine Hochlandlegende (1900)
- Der „Warjag" (1904)
- Das stille Nest. Ein Tiroler Roman (1907)
- Das Haus Michael Senn. Ein Tiroler Roman (1909)
- Allerseelen. Tiroler Roman (1910)
- Gertraud Sonnweber (1912)
- Äbtissin Verena (1915)
- Die Stadt am Inn (1917)
- Der Garten Gottes (1919)
- Königin Heimat (1921)
- Der Hirt von Zenoberg. Ein Margarethe-Maultasch-Roman (1922)
- Fridolin Kristallers Ehekarren (1923)
- Vorfrühling der Liebe (1924)
- Mysterium der Sebaldusnacht (1925)
- Die große Sehnsucht (1926)
- Das Paradies der Philister (1927)
- Golgatha der Ehe (1929)
- Der Turm des Schweigens (1930)
- Dämon Weib (1931)
- Das heimliche Leben (1932)
- Regina Rautenwald (1933)
- Der steile Weg (1940)

=== Stories ===
- Wer steinigt sie? Eine Geschichte armer Leute (1887)
- Tiroler Leut. Berggeschichten und Skizzen (1892)
- Leni. Eine Tiroler Bauerngeschichte (1893)
- Das letzte Abendmahl. Eine Erzählung aus der Zeit Christi (1893)
- Die Steingruberischen. Der Kooperator. Zwei Tiroler Bauerngeschichten (1894)
- Über Berg und Tal. Ernste und heitere Geschichten aus Tirol (1899)
- Das goldene Kegelspiel. Neue Tiroler Geschichten (1905)
- Auf der Sonnseit'n. Lustige Tiroler Geschichten (1911)
- Rund um den Kirchturm. Lustige Tiroler Geschichten (1916)
- Bergheimat. Zwei Erzählungen aus Tirol (1918)
- Die Pforten der Ewigkeit. Legenden (1920)
- Der heilige Bürokrazius – eine heitere Legende (1922)
- Versunkene Zeit. Romantische Liebesgeschichten aus Tirol (1929)

=== Stage plays ===
- Incognito. Schwank in drei Akten (1893)
- Zwergkönig Laurin. Schauspiel in vier Akten (1894)
- Die Kramerin von Weißenbach. Bauernposse mit Gesang und Tanz in einem Akt (1894)
- Der Sündenfall. Volksstück in vier Aufzügen (1894)
- Das Krippenspiel von der glorreichen Geburt unseres Heilands. Großes Volksschauspiel in sechs Bildern (1895)
- Der Märtyrer. Bühnenspiel in fünf Akten aus der Zeit der ersten Christen (1902)
- Die Vergangenheit. Schauspiel in drei Aufzügen (1912)

=== Poems ===
- Die Studenten. Burschikose Strophen à la Klapphorn (1885)
- Zithaschlag'n. Allahand Gsangaln und Gschicht'n aus Tirol (1890)

=== Literary writings ===
- Die tragischen Motive in der deutschen Dichtung seit Goethes Tode (1889)
- Heinrich Heine und das deutsche Volkslied (1894)

=== Religious writings ===
- Moderne Erbsünden. Ein Zeitspiegel (1895)
- Christus und die Armen. Eine geharnischte Streitschrift (1895)
- Bauernbibel (1897); Neuausgaben ab 1907 unter dem Titel Tiroler Bauernbibel

=== Other writings ===
- Meraner Spaziergänge (1894)
- Das Gymnasium oder die systematische Verdummung der Jugend (1895)
- Von Innsbruck nach Kufstein. Eine Wanderung durch das Unterinntal (1902)
- Marterln und Votivtaferln des Tuifelemalers Kassian Kluibenschädel. Zu Nutz und Frommen der verehrlichen Zeitgenossen (1905)

In addition, Rudolf Greinz published the poems of Hermann von Gilm zu Rosenegg, the collection Unter dem Doppelaar. Kriegsnovellen aus Österreich (1915) as well as numerous other anthologies, especially for Reclam's universal library, and literary yearbooks, including the "Taschenbuch für Bücherfreunde" and "Staackmann's Almanac".
