= Ernst Zahn =

Swiss writer

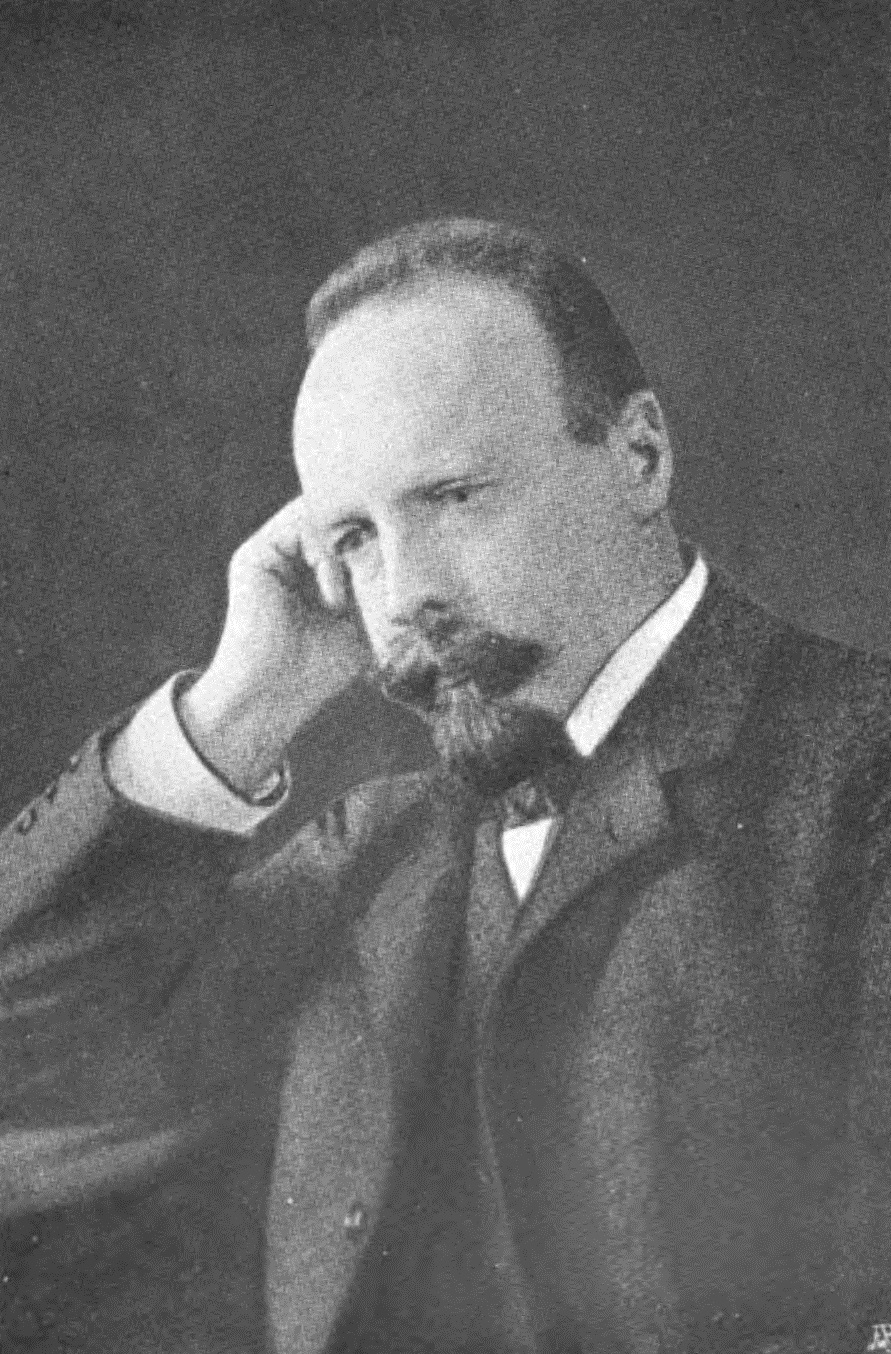
Ernst Zahn.

Ernst Zahn (24 January 1867 in Zürich, Switzerland – 12 February 1952 in Meggen) was a Swiss author. His writing took its themes from Swiss local life.

== Biography ==
In 1873 his father, an innkeeper, bought a hotel at Siders in the canton of Wallis, and here Ernst obtained his first instruction in the Protestant Elementary School. In 1875, he went to Zurich, where his grandparents took charge of him and sent him to the public schools, later (for three years) to the gymnasium. His father leased, in 1880, the restaurant in the railroad station at Goschenen, at the entrance to the Saint Gotthard Tunnel, and here Zahn worked as a waiter in 1883. For a year and a half he also attended the Breidenstein International Boys' School at Grenchen, canton of Solothurn. In all these various capacities, and in spite of a much interrupted education, he was energetically pursuing every opportunity that presented itself to him for increasing his knowledge. In the winter of 1885 he again worked as a waiter at Hotel Beaurivage, Geneva. In the winter of 1886, he was at Hastings, England, learning the language. In 1887 he was hotel clerk at the Hotel de la Ville, Genoa.

He returned to his father's restaurant in 1888, becoming a partner in 1894 and taking sole charge in 1897. The town of Goschenen made him a town councillor, and one of his first acts in office was to cause the erection of a monument for the constructor of the Mount Saint Gotthard Tunnel and for the many laborers who met their death during its construction. In 1902 he became judge of the Uri Criminal Court, in 1904 a member of the Cantonal Council of Uri, in 1908 its president. He received the honorary degree of Ph.D. from the University of Geneva in 1909.

== Works ==
- Stephan der Schmied (English tr. in German Classics, v. XIX, New York, 1914)
- Herzens-Kämpfe, narration, 1893
- Erni Behaim, historical novel, Stuttgart 1898
- Albin Indergand, novel, Frauenfeld 1901
- Schattenhalb, three narrations, 1904
- Die Clari-Marie, novel, Frauenfeld 1905
- Die Helden des Alltags, 1905 (20th ed., 1912)
- Verena Stadler, narration, Frauenfeld 1906
- Firnwind, 1906
- Lukas Hochstrassers Haus, novel, Frauenfeld 1907
- Einsamkeit, 1910
- Die Frauen von Tannò, novel, Frauenfeld 1911
- Der Apotheker von Klein Weltwil, Stuttgart 1913
- Die Liebe des Severin Imboden, novel, Frauenfeld 1916
- Einmal muss wieder Friede werden, narrations, Stuttgart 1916
- Nacht, narration, Frauenfeld 1917
- Der Lästerer, narration, Frauenfeld, 1917
- Blancheflur, narration, Berlin 1923
- Frau Sixta. Ein Roman aus den Bergen, Düsseldorf 1926
- Die tausendjährige Strasse, novel, 1939

== Sources ==
- Jacob Wittmer Hartmann (1920). "Zahn, Ernst" . In Rines, George Edwin (ed.). Encyclopedia Americana.
