= Elise Aulinger =

German actress (1881–1965)

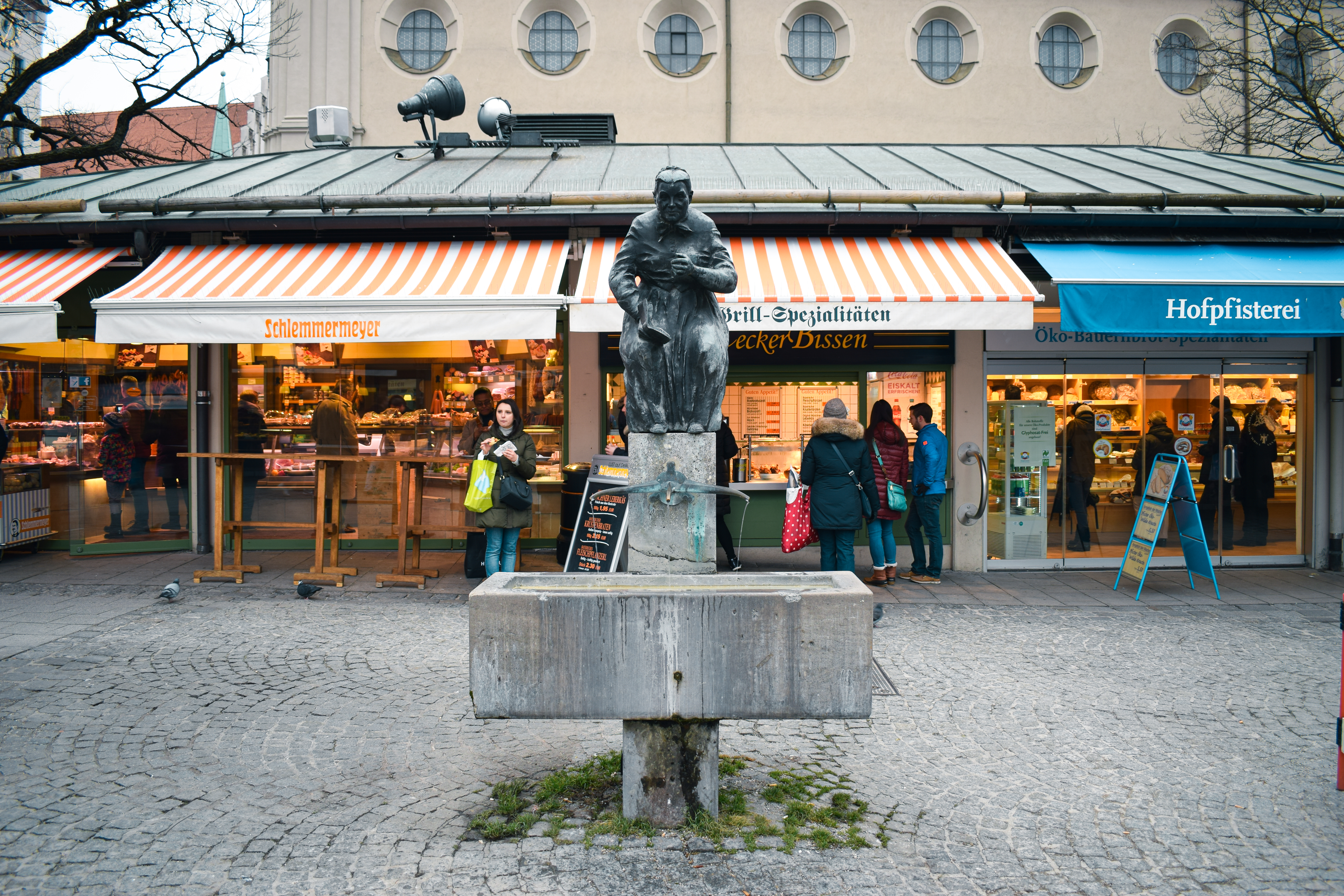
- Elise Aulinger fountain at the Viktualienmarkt in Munich, by Anton Rückel, 1977
- Born: 11 December 1881; Munich, German Empire
- Died: 12 February 1965 (aged 83); Munich, West Germany
- Resting place: Munich Waldfriedhof
- Occupation: Actress
- Years active: 1903–1956
- Spouse: Max Sommer

Elise Aulinger (11 December 1881 – 12 February 1965) was a German stage, radio and film actress.

== Selected filmography ==
- The Favourite of the Queen (1922)
- Martin Luther (1923)
- What the Stones Tell (1925)
- The Seventh Son (1926)
- Behind Monastery Walls (1928)
- The Love Express (1931)
- S.A.-Mann Brand (1933)
- Marriage Strike (1935)
- Der Kaiser von Kalifornien (1936)
- The Three Around Christine (1936)
- Travelling People (1938)
- Three Wonderful Days (1939)
- The Right to Love (1939)
- The Eternal Spring (1940)
- Krambambuli (1940)
- The Fire Devil (1940)
- Wunschkonzert (1940)
- The Sinful Village (1940)
- Anuschka (1942)
- The Little Residence (1942)
- Don't Talk to Me About Love (1943)
- A Salzburg Comedy (1943)
- Bravo, Little Thomas (1945)
- Gaspary's Sons (1948)
- I'll Never Forget That Night (1949)
- Madonna in Chains (1949)
- The Violin Maker of Mittenwald (1950)
- Hanna Amon (1951)
- Border Post 58 (1951)
- One Night's Intoxication (1951)
- The Cloister of Martins (1951)
- The Last Shot (1951)
- The Crucifix Carver of Ammergau (1952)
- The Blue and White Lion (1952)
- The Imaginary Invalid (1952)
- Marriage Strike (1953)
- The Immortal Vagabond (1953)
- Fear (La Paura) (1954)
- The Sinful Village (1954)
- The Golden Plague (1954)
- One Woman Is Not Enough? (1955)
- The Priest from Kirchfeld (1955)
- Son Without a Home (1955)
- The Double Husband (1955)
