= The Muzzle (1938 film) =

1938 film

- Directed by: Erich Engel
- Written by: Heinrich Spoerl
- Produced by: Karl Julius Fritzsche; Fritz Klotsch
- Starring: Ralph Arthur Roberts; Hilde Weissner; Charlotte Schellhorn
- Cinematography: Reimar Kuntze
- Edited by: Alice Ludwig
- Music by: Peter Kreuder
- Production company: Tobis Film
- Distributed by: Tobis Film
- Release date: 11 February 1938
- Running time: 80 minutes
- Country: Germany
- Language: German

The Muzzle (German: Der Maulkorb) is a 1938 German comedy film directed by Erich Engel and starring Ralph Arthur Roberts, Hilde Weissner and Charlotte Schellhorn. It was remade in 1958.

The film's art direction was by Robert Herlth.

== Cast ==
- Ralph Arthur Roberts as Prosecutor Herbert von Traskow
- Hilde Weissner as Elisabeth von Traskow
- Charlotte Schellhorn as Trude von Traskow
- Will Quadflieg as Rabanus, painter
- Renée Stobrawa as Billa, maid
- Theodor Loos as Senior Prosecutor
- Paul Henckels as Wimm
- Ludwig Schmitz as Bätes
- Elisabeth Flickenschildt as the lady at the interrogation
- Werner Pledath as dentist
- Hermann Pfeiffer as Mühsaam, detective inspector
- Maria Krahn as Mrs. Tigges
- Gerd Høst as nude model
- Otto Matthies as Thürnagel, trainee lawyer
- Walter Bluhm as Little Match
- Werner Scharf as Ali, painter
- Hugo Werner-Kahle as chairman of the court hearing
- Erich Ziegel as Councilor of Justice
- Adolf Fischer as Schibulski, detective
- Aribert Grimmer as a police officer
- Leonie Duval as owner of the leather goods store
- Valeska Stock as Schmitz` wife
- Hans Meyer-Hanno as police officer
- Werner Funck as a public prosecutor
- Maria Hofen
- Renate Howe as an apprentice
- Karl Junge-Swinburne as a public prosecutor
- Max Wilmsen as dog owner
- Georg A. Profé as artist, guest at the studio party
- Fanny Cotta as guest at the studio party
- Georg Georgi as banker
- Rudolf Fenner as Prosecutor's secretary
- Bernhard Gronau as Meyer, detective
- Kurt Meister as the fifth regular visitor
- Kurt Getke as a detective
- Charly Berger as a police officer
- Walter Ruesta as a newspaper seller
- Otto Lange
- Erich Schuster
- Alfred Haase

== Bibliography ==
- Williams, Alan (2002). Film and Nationalism. Rutgers University Press. ISBN 978-0-8135-3040-6.
