= Hans Kuhnert =

German actor and art director

- Born: 4 January 1901; Berlin, German Empire
- Died: 29 July 1974 (aged 73); West Berlin, West Germany
- Occupations: Film actor art director production designer
- Years active: 1919–1963

Hans Kuhnert (4 January 1901 – 29 July 1974) was a German actor, art director and production designer. Kuhnert began his career as an actor during the silent era. He played the lead alongside Olga Chekhova in Violet. From the mid-1930s Kuhnert switched to working on the visual design of film sets. He worked frequently at this into the 1960s. He was sometimes credited as Hanns H. Kuhnert.

== Selected filmography ==
=== Actor ===
- The Feast of Rosella (1919)
- The Peruvian (1919)
- Intrigue (1920)
- Violet (1921)
- Der falsche Prinz (1922)
- Tragedy of Love (1923)
- Dreiklang der Nacht (1924)
- The Third Watch (1924)

=== Art Director ===
- Holiday From Myself (1934)
- The Monastery's Hunter (1935)
- The Saint and Her Fool (1935)
- The Haunted Castle (1936)
- Frau Sixta (1938)
- Storms in May (1938)
- The Rothschilds (1940)
- Left of the Isar, Right of the Spree (1940)
- People in the Storm (1941)
- Laugh Bajazzo (1943)
- Laugh, Pagliacci (1943)
- Light of Heart (1943)
- Harald Arrives at Nine (1944)
- The Lost Face (1948)
- Man on a Tightrope (1953)
- Salto Mortale (1953)
- Night People (1954)
- Carnival Story (1954)
- Circus of Love (1954)
- Ten on Every Finger (1954)
- Love Is Just a Fairytale (1955)
- Yes, Yes, Love in Tyrol (1955)
- Spy for Germany (1956)
- Black Forest Melody (1956)
- The Fox of Paris (1957)
- Black Forest Cherry Schnapps (1958)
- Two Hearts in May (1958)
- World in My Pocket (1961)
- You Must Be Blonde on Capri (1961)
- Scotland Yard Hunts Dr. Mabuse (1963)

=== Production Designer ===
- The Hunter of Fall (1936)
- Lache Bajazzo (1943)
- Spy for Germany (1956)
- Peter Voss, Thief of Millions (1958)

== Bibliography ==
- Hardt, Ursula. From Caligari to California: Erich Pommer's life in the International Film Wars. Berghahn Books, 1996.
