= Thea Aichbichler =

German actress (1889–1957)

- Born: 21 August 1889; Munich, German Empire
- Died: 25 June 1957 (aged 67); Munich, West Germany
- Occupation: Actress
- Years active: 1934–1957

Thea Aichbichler Mohr (21 August 1889 – 25 June 1957) was a German actress. She appeared in more than thirty films from 1934 to 1957.

== Selected filmography ==
Year	Title	Role	Notes
1955	Der Ochse von Kulm	Therese	
1952	The Crucifix Carver of Ammergau	Frau	
1943	The War of the Oxen	Marianne Somenier	
1940	Der Herr im Haus	Mrs. Anger	
1936	The Hunter of Fall	Buchnerin	
1936	The Unsuspecting Angel		
1934	Between Heaven and Earth	Witwe Brugger	
1934	At Blonde Kathrein's Place	Minna Fromm	
