= The Hunter of Fall (novel) =

1883 novel by Ludwig Ganghofer

- Author: Ludwig Ganghofer
- Language: German
- Genre: Drama
- Publication date: 1883
- Publication place: German Empire
- Media type: Print

The Hunter of Fall (German: Der Jäger von Fall) is an 1883 novel by the German writer Ludwig Ganghofer. It is set in Bavaria and depicts a running battle between a poacher and a gamekeeper.

== Adaptations ==
The story has been adapted to film on a number of occasions.

== Bibliography ==
- Goble, Alan (1999). The Complete Index to Literary Sources in Film. Walter de Gruyter. ISBN 978-3-11-095194-3.
