= Ludwig Ganghofer =

German writer (1855–1920)

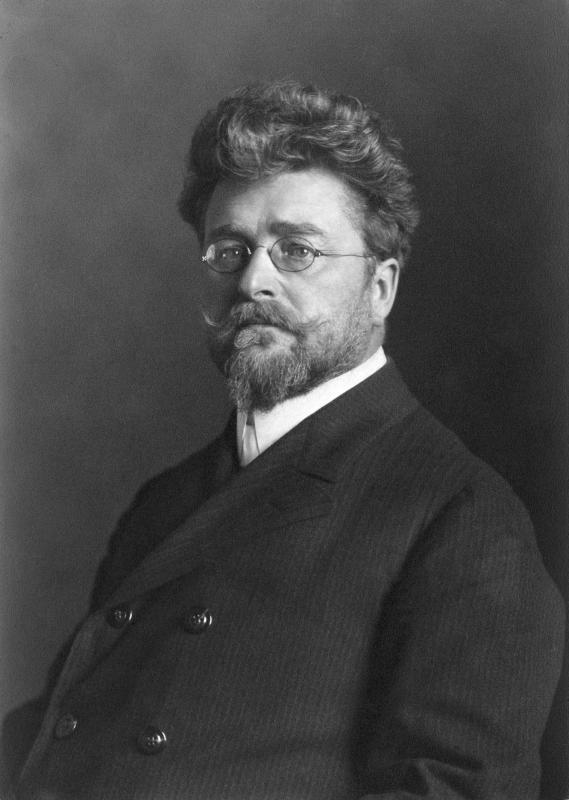
- Born: 7 July 1855; Kaufbeuren, Kingdom of Bavaria
- Died: 24 July 1920 (aged 65); Tegernsee, Bavaria, Germany
- Education: Leipzig University
- Occupations: novelist, playwright
- Writing career
- Genres: Homeland novel, historical novel, novella
- Notable works: Der Klosterjäger; Die Martinsklause; Schloß Hubertus; Der Ochsenkrieg

Signature
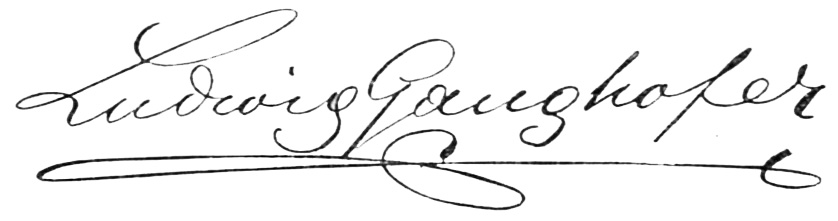

Ludwig Ganghofer (7 July 1855 – 24 July 1920) was a German writer. He has been called the "most-adapted author in the history of German cinema", as many of his novels were turned into films.

== Biography ==
Ganghofer was born in Kaufbeuren, Bavaria, the son of forestry official August Ganghofer (1827–1900). His younger sister Ida (1863–1944) married the geologist and geographer Albrecht Penck in 1886. The geomorphologist Walther Penck was Ganghofer's nephew. He graduated from gymnasium secondary school in 1873 and subsequently worked as a fitter in Augsburg engine works. In 1875, he entered Munich Polytechnic as a student of mechanical engineering, but eventually changed his major to history of literature and philosophy, which subjects he studied at the Ludwig-Maximilians-Universität München, the Friedrich Wilhelm University of Berlin and Leipzig University. In 1879, he was awarded a doctorate from Leipzig University.

Ganghofer wrote his first play "Der Herrgottschnitzer von Ammergau" (The Crucifix Carver of Ammergau) in 1880 for the Munich Gärtnerplatz Theatre, where it was given 19 performances. But his breakthrough was a guest performance of this play in Berlin, where it was staged more than 100 times. Subsequently, Ganghofer worked as dramaturge at the Ringtheater in Vienna (1881), as a freelance writer for the family paper Die Gartenlaube and as a feuilleton editor of the Neues Wiener Tagblatt (1886–1891). In Vienna, Ganghofer was a frequent guest at the salon in the Palais Todesco, where he met with artists like Hugo von Hofmannsthal and Johann Strauss. From 1891, he worked mainly as a writer of Alpine novels, inspired by the sojourns at his hunting lodge near Leutasch in Tyrol; but he also produced e.g. Hugo von Hofmannsthal's play "Der Tor und der Tod". He also founded the Munich Literary Society.

His work as a voluntary war correspondent from 1915 and 1917 is less known. During those years, he wrote – besides propagandistic war reports e.g. "Reise zur deutschen Front" (Travel to the German frontlines) – a large number of patriotic war poems, which were published in collections like "Eiserne Zither" (Iron Zither) and "Neue Kriegslieder" (New War Songs). Being a personal friend of Emperor Wilhelm II and his favourite poet, Ganghofer's war reports frequently lauded the emperor, his Chief of General Staff Paul von Hindenburg and their conduct of the war. Until shortly before the German capitulation, he continued to publish calls not to give up fighting. He was seriously wounded in the war and was awarded the Iron Cross. In 1917, he and his friend Ludwig Thoma joined the far-right German Fatherland Party which was dissolved in the Revolution of 1918–19, and his political activities ceased. Heavily criticised by colleagues like Karl Kraus, readings of his militaristic works provided him with an above average income.

After the end of the war, Ganghofer returned to his profession as a writer. He dedicated his last work "Das Land der Bayern in Farbenphotographie" (The country of Bavaria in coloured photography) to "His Majesty King Ludwig III of Bavaria in deepest reverence". Shortly afterwards, Ganghofer died in Tegernsee.

Ganghofer's works, in particular his novels, are still published today. By 2004, it is estimated that more than 30 million copies of his works had been sold. Besides, among German authors Ganghofer's works have been some of the most frequently adapted as films, starting with silent films in the 1910s and 1920s, and continuing during the Heimatfilm era after World War II. His works, which describe the life of simple, competent, honest people, are often seen as kitsch – not least because most of them are staged against the background of an idyllic Bavarian Alps scenery.

== Selected works ==
- Der Herrgottschnitzer von Ammergau (folk play, 1880)
- The Hunter of Fall (novel, 1883) – freely available on www.wissen-im-netz.info (in German)
- Die Sünden der Väter, (novel, 1886)
- Edelweißkönig (novel, 1886) – freely available on www.wissen-im-netz.info
- The Monastery's Hunter (novel, 1892) – freely available on www.wissen-im-netz.info
- Die Martinsklause (novel, 1894) – freely available on www.wissen-im-netz.info
- Hubertus Castle (novel, 1895) – freely available on www.wissen-im-netz.info
- Das Schweigen im Walde (novel, 1899)
- Der Dorfapostel (novel, 1900)
- Das neue Wesen. Roman aus dem 16. Jahrhundert, (historical novel, 1902)
- Der Hohe Schein (novel, 1904)
- Storms in May (novel, 1904)
- Der Besondere, (Erzählung, 1904)
- Der Mann im Salz (novel, 1906) – freely available on www.wissen-im-netz.info
- Waldrausch (novel, 1907) – freely available on www.wissen-im-netz.info
- Lebenslauf eines Optimisten (Autobiographie, 3 Bde., 1909–1911) – freely available on www.wissen-im-netz.info
- The War of the Oxen (novel, 1914) – freely available on www.wissen-im-netz.info
- Die Trutze von Trutzberg. Roman aus d. 15. Jahrhundert, (historical novel, 1915) – freely available on www.wissen-im-netz.info
- Reise zur deutschen Front (report, 1915) – freely available on www.wissen-im-netz.info
- Das große Jagen (novel, 1918) – freely available on www.wissen-im-netz.info
- Der laufende Berg (Hochlandsroman, 1920) – freely available on www.wissen-im-netz.info

== Selected adaptations as films ==
- Hubertus Castle (1954), by Helmut Weiss
- The Hunter of Fall (1956), by Gustav Ucicky
- Waldrausch (1962), by Paul May
- Hubertus Castle (1973), by Harald Reinl
- The Hunter of Fall (1974), by Harald Reinl
- Waldrausch (1977), by Horst Hächler
