= List of German films of 1925 =

This is a list of the most notable films produced in the Cinema of Germany in 1925.

Title	Director	Cast	Genre	Notes
1925
The Adventures of Captain Hasswell	Rolf Randolf	Ria Jende, Maria Zelenka	Adventure	
The Adventure of Mr. Philip Collins	Johannes Guter	Georg Alexander, Ossi Oswalda	Comedy	
The Adventures of Sybil Brent	Carl Froelich	Henny Porten, Memo Benassi	Silent	
Adventure on the Night Express	Harry Piel	Harry Piel, Dary Holm	Thriller	
The Adventurous Wedding	Franz Seitz	Hans Unterkircher, Maria Minzenti, Alice Hechy	Silent	
The Alternative Bride	Carl Wilhelm	Ida Wüst, Bruno Kastner	Romance	
Anne-Liese of Dessau	James Bauer	Maly Delschaft, Werner Pittschau, Julia Serda	Historical	
An Artist of Life	Holger-Madsen	Erna Morena, Grete Mosheim	Silent	
The Ascent of Little Lilian	Fred Sauer	Maria Zelenka, Bruno Kastner	Silent	
Ash Wednesday	Wolfgang Neff	Bernd Aldor, Sybill Morel	Drama	
The Assmanns	Arthur Bergen	Grete Reinwald, Bruno Kastner	Silent	
Athletes	Frederic Zelnik	Asta Nielsen, Gregori Chmara	Silent	
Ballettratten	Arthur Günsburg	Carl de Vogt, Cläre Lotto, Victor Varconi	Silent	
Die Barcarole	Julius Pinschewer, Lotte Reiniger		animation	
Bismarck	Ernst Wendt	Franz Ludwig, Erna Morena	Historical	
The Blackguard	Graham Cutts	Jane Novak, Walter Rilla	Drama	Co-production with the UK
Chamber Music	Carl Froelich	Henny Porten, Ida Wüst	Drama	
Chronicles of the Gray House	Arthur von Gerlach	Paul Hartmann, Lil Dagover	Historical drama	
The Circus Princess	Adolf Gärtner	Josefine Dora, Olga Engl	Silent	
The City of Temptation	Walter Niebuhr	Olga Chekhova, Julanne Johnston	Drama	
Cock of the Roost	Georg Jacoby	Reinhold Schünzel, Elga Brink, Maly Delschaft	Comedy	
Comedians	Karl Grune	Lya De Putti, Eugen Klöpfer	Silent	
The Company Worth Millions	Fred Sauer	Olaf Fjord, Olga Chekhova, Colette Brettel	Silent	
Countess Maritza	Hans Steinhoff	Vivian Gibson, Harry Liedtke	Silent	
Curfew	Conrad Wiene	Harry Nestor, Cläre Lotto	Drama	
Dancing Mad	Alexander Korda	Victor Varconi, María Corda	Comedy	
The Dealer from Amsterdam	Victor Janson	Werner Krauss, Hilde Hildebrand	Silent	
Den of Iniquity	Constantin J. David	Reinhold Schünzel, Jack Trevor, Maly Delschaft	Silent	
Destiny	Felix Basch	Lucy Doraine, Conrad Veidt	Drama	
The Dice Game of Life	Heinz Paul	Frida Richard, Hella Moja	Silent	
The Director General	Fritz Wendhausen	Albert Bassermann, Hanna Ralph, Alexandra Sorina	Silent	
The Doll of Luna Park	Jaap Speyer	Alice Hechy, Walter Rilla	Drama	
The Doll Queen	Gennaro Righelli	Maria Jacobini, Harry Liedtke	Comedy	
The Elegant Bunch	Jaap Speyer	Eugen Klöpfer, Mary Odette	Silent	
Erste Hilfe bei Unglücksfällen	Gertrud David		documentary	
Express Train of Love	Johannes Guter	Ossi Oswalda, Willy Fritsch, Lillian Hall-Davis	Comedy	
The Farmer from Texas	Joe May	Mady Christians, Willy Fritsch	Comedy	
Father Voss	Max Mack	Stewart Rome, Mary Odette	Comedy	
Ferientage auf Amrum	Gertrud David		animation	
Film	Guido Seeber		animation	
Der Film im Film	Friedrich Porges		documentary	
The Fire Dancer	Robert Dinesen	Alfred Abel, Ruth Weyher	Silent	
Fire of Love	Paul L. Stein	Liane Haid, Walter Rilla	Silent	
Flight Around the World	Willi Wolff	Ellen Richter, Reinhold Schünzel	Adventure	
The Flower Woman of Potsdam Square	Jaap Speyer	Erika Glässner, Ralph Arthur Roberts	Comedy	
Der Flug um den Erdball, 1. Teil - Paris bis Ceylon	Willi Wolff			
The Found Bride	Rochus Gliese	Xenia Desni, Jenny Jugo	Comedy	
A Free People	Martin Berger	Albert Florath, Ellen Plessow	Drama	
Frisian Blood	Fred Sauer	Jenny Jugo, Gustav Fröhlich, Hans Adalbert Schlettow	Silent	
Fröhlich Pfalz - Gott erhalts	Heinrich Pfeiffer		documentary	
The Gentleman Without a Residence	Heinrich Bolten-Baeckers	Georg Alexander, Georg John	Comedy	
The Girl from America	Josef Stein	Carl de Vogt, Hermann Leffler, Cläre Lotto	Romance	
The Girl on the Road	Richard Eichberg	Lilian Harvey, Hans Brausewetter	Comedy	
The Girl with a Patron	Max Mack	Ossi Oswalda, Willy Fritsch	Comedy	
Goetz von Berlichingen of the Iron Hand	Hubert Moest	Eugen Klöpfer, Friedrich Kühne	Historical	
Golden Boy	H. Klynmann	Grete Reinwald, Carl Auen	Silent	
The Golden Calf	Peter Paul Felner	Henny Porten, Olga Engl	Drama	
The Great Opportunity	Lorand von Kabdebo	Kurt Vespermann, Lia Eibenschütz	Silent	
Hampelmanns Traumfahrt	Edward Schulz-Keffel		animation	
The Hanseatics	Gerhard Lamprecht	Tamara Karsavina, Fritz Alberti	Drama	
Harry Hill's Deadly Hunt	Lorenz Bätz, Willy Rath	Valy Arnheim, Sybill Morel	Silent	
Hedda Gabler	Franz Eckstein	Asta Nielsen, Paul Morgan	Drama	
Hidden Fires	Einar Bruun	Alfons Fryland, Mary Nolan	Silent	
The Humble Man and the Chanteuse	E. A. Dupont	Lil Dagover, Olga Limburg	Silent	
Hussar Fever	Georg Jacoby	Max Hansen, Georg Alexander	Comedy	
I Love You	Paul L. Stein	Liane Haid, Alfons Fryland, Anny Ondra	Drama	
If Only It Weren't Love	Robert Dinesen	Jenny Jugo, Fritz Alberti	Drama	
If You Have an Aunt	Carl Boese	Maly Delschaft, Wilhelm Diegelmann	Silent	
Insulinde	Max Hauschild		documentary	
Im Lande der Morgenstille	Norbert Weber		documentary	
In the Name of the Kaisers	Robert Dinesen	Lya De Putti, Hermann Vallentin	Silent	
In the Valleys of the Southern Rhine	Rudolf Walther-Fein, Rudolf Dworsky	Albert Steinrück, Erna Morena	Silent	
The Iron Bride	Carl Boese	Otto Gebühr, Claire Rommer, Maly Delschaft	Silent	
The Island of Dreams	Paul L. Stein	Liane Haid, Harry Liedtke	Silent	
Jealousy	Karl Grune	Lya De Putti, Werner Krauss	Comedy	
Joyless Street	Georg Wilhelm Pabst	Asta Nielsen, Greta Garbo	Drama	
The King and the Girl	Nunzio Malasomma	Luciano Albertini, Evi Eva	Silent	
Lena Warnstetten	Erich Eriksen	Grete Reinwald, William Dieterle	Silent	
Letters Which Never Reached Him	Frederic Zelnik	Albert Bassermann, Marcella Albani	Drama	
Lieblinge der Menschen	Eberhard Fangauf		documentary	
Lightning	Rudolf Walther-Fein	William Dieterle, Lia Eibenschütz	Silent	
Living Buddhas	Paul Wegener	Asta Nielsen, Käthe Haack	Silent	
Love and Trumpets	Richard Eichberg	Lilian Harvey, Harry Liedtke	Comedy	
Love is Blind	Lothar Mendes	Lil Dagover, Conrad Veidt, Lillian Hall-Davis	Silent	
Love Story	Fritz Freisler	Olga Chekhova, Hans Unterkircher, Hans Thimig	Silent	
The Love Trap	Richard Eichberg	Hans Wassmann, Maria Reisenhofer	Silent	
Love's Finale	Felix Basch	Nils Asther, Lucy Doraine	Silent	
KIPHO	Julius Pinschewer		documentary	
The Man in the Saddle	Manfred Noa	Harry Hardt, Colette Darfeuil	Sports	
The Man on the Comet	Alfred Halm	Luciano Albertini, Maly Delschaft	Adventure	
The Man Who Sold Himself	Hans Steinhoff	Hans Mierendorff, Vivian Gibson	Drama	
The Marriage Swindler	Carl Boese	Reinhold Schünzel, Käthe Haack	Comedy	
The Morals of the Alley	Jaap Speyer	Werner Krauss, Mary Odette	Silent	
The Motorist Bride	Richard Eichberg	Hans Mierendorff, Lee Parry	Romance	
Mrs Worrington's Perfume	Franz Seitz	Ernst Reicher, Mary Nolan	Mystery	
Nameless Heroes	Curtis Bernhardt	Erwin Kalser, Heinz Hilpert	Silent	
Neptune Bewitched	Willy Achsel	Paul Heidemann, Willy Kaiser-Heyl	Comedy	
Nick, King of the Chauffeurs	Carl Wilhelm	Carlo Aldini, Olga Engl	Silent	
Niniche	Victor Janson	Ossi Oswalda, Vivian Gibson	Comedy	
The Occupation of the Rhineland	Berthold Bartosch		animation	
Oh Those Glorious Old Student Days	Heinz Schall	Eugen Klöpfer, Maria Zelenka, Hans Mierendorff	Silent	
The Old Ballroom	Wolfgang Neff	Carl Auen, Olga Chekhova	Drama	
Old Mamsell's Secret	Paul Merzbach	Frida Richard, Marcella Albani	Silent	
One Minute to Twelve	Nunzio Malasomma	Luciano Albertini, Charlotte Ander	Drama	
Opus IV	Walter Ruttmann		Animation	Film at YouTube(links to video of Opus II through IV with modern soundtrack)
The Painter and His Model	Jean Manoussi	Léon Mathot, Ginette Maddie	Silent	Co-production with France
Passion	Richard Eichberg	Otto Gebühr, Lilian Harvey	Drama	
The Pearls of Doctor Talmadge	Max Obal	Ernst Reicher, Alexandra Sorina	Mystery	
People in Need	Wolfgang Neff	Hermine Sterler, Werner Pittschau, Claire Rommer	War	
People of the Sea	Léo Lasko	Fritz Kampers, Elisabeth Pinajeff, Fritz Rasp	Drama	
Peter the Pirate	Arthur Robison	Paul Richter, Aud Egede-Nissen	Adventure	
The Pleasure Garden	Alfred Hitchcock	Virginia Valli, Carmelita Geraghty	Melodrama	Co-production with the UK. Filmed in Munich and Italy
Prem Sanyas	Franz Osten; Himanshu Rai			
The Proud Silence	Erich Eriksen	Colette Brettel, Ernst Winar	Silent	
Rags and Silk	Richard Oswald	Reinhold Schünzel; Johannes Riemann	Comedy	
Rebus Film Nr. 1	Paul Leni			
Rebus Film Nr. 2	Paul Leni		animation	
Rebus Film Nr. 3	Paul Leni		animation	
Reluctant Imposter	Géza von Bolváry	Vladimir Gajdarov, Olga Gzovskaya	Silent	
Reveille	Fritz Kaufmann	Werner Krauss, Ruth Weyher	War	
Rhythmus 25	Hans Richter		animation	
The Royal Grenadiers	Géza von Bolváry	Carl Walther Meyer, Helene von Bolváry	Silent	
Das Rudern	Werner Funck		documentary	
The Salesgirl from the Fashion Store	Wolfgang Neff	Reinhold Schünzel, Evi Eva	Comedy	
The Searching Soul	Rudolf Biebrach	Lucy Doraine, Otto Wernicke	Silent	
The Second Mother	Heinrich Bolten-Baeckers	Margarete Lanner, Jack Trevor	Comedy	
The Secret of Castle Elmshoh	Max Obal	Ernst Reicher, Gertrud de Lalsky, Anton Walbrook	Crime	
Semi-Silk	Richard Oswald	Bernd Aldor, Valeska Stock	Silent	
Shadows of the Metropolis	Willi Wolff	Ellen Richter, Alfred Gerasch	Drama	
She	Leander de Cordova, G. B. Samuelson	Betty Blythe, Carlyle Blackwell	Adventure	Co-production with UK
Ship in Distress	Fred Sauer	Gustav Fröhlich, Jenny Jugo	Drama	
The Shot in the Pavilion	Max Obal	Ernst Reicher, Margarete Schlegel	Crime	
Should We Get Married?	Manfred Noa	Vilma Bánky, Angelo Ferrari	Silent	
Slums of Berlin	Gerhard Lamprecht	Aud Egede-Nissen, Bernhard Goetzke, Mady Christians	Drama	
A Song from Days of Youth	Franz Osten	Maria Minzenti, John Mylong, Ferdinand Martini	Silent	
An Sonnigen Gestaden	Werner Funck		documentary	
Sprechende Hände	Gertrud David		documentary	
Die Stadt der Millionen	Adolf Trotz		documentary	
The Story of Lilian Hawley	Franz W. Koebner	Lotte Neumann, Livio Pavanelli	Drama	
Im Strudel des Verkehrs. Ein Film für Jedermann	Leo Peukert		documentary	
Struggle for the Soil	Erich Waschneck	Ferdinand von Alten, Margarete Schön	Drama	
Swifter Than Death	Harry Piel, Gérard Bourgeois	Harry Piel, Dary Holm, Denise Legeay	Action	Co-production with France
The Telephone Operator	Hanns Schwarz	André Mattoni, Alexander Murski	Comedy	
Three Waiting Maids	Carl Boese	Hanni Weisse, Maly Delschaft	Comedy	
The Tower of Silence	Johannes Guter	Xenia Desni, Nigel Barrie	Drama	
Tragedy	Carl Froelich	Walter Janssen, Henny Porten	Drama	
Traumspiel	Walter Ruttmann		Animation	
The Untouched Woman	Constantin J. David	Mary Nolan, Tamara Geva	Silent	
Upstairs and Downstairs	Richard Oswald, Carl Wilhelm	Max Adalbert, Mary Kid, Hans Albers	Silent	
Urwelt im Urwald	Adolf Freiherr von Dungern		documentary	
Variety	E. A. Dupont	Emil Jannings, Lya De Putti	Drama	
The Venus of Montmartre	Frederic Zelnik	Lya Mara, Hans Albers, Jack Trevor	Drama	
Vom unsichtbaren Königreich - Bilder aus der Arbeit der inneren Mission	Gertrud David		documentary	
Vom unsichtbaren Königreich - Dienst an Kranken und Alten	Gertrud David		documentary	
Vom unsichtbaren Königreich - Evangelische Auswanderer- und Bahnhofsmission	Gertrud David		documentary	
Vom unsichtbaren Königreich - Evangelische Erziehungsarbeit	Gertrud David		documentary	
Vom unsichtbaren Königreich - Evangelische Flußschiffermission	Gertrud David		documentary	
Vom unsichtbaren Königreich - Die innere Mission in den Nöten und Leiden des Alltags	Gertrud David		documentary	
Wallenstein	Rolf Randolf	Fritz Greiner, Eduard von Winterstein	Historical	
A Waltz Dream	Ludwig Berger	Willy Fritsch, Mady Christians, Xenia Desni	Drama	
War in Peace	Carl Boese	Trude Berliner, Hans Sternberg	Silent	
What the Stones Tell	Rolf Randolf	Ernst Rückert, Fritz Greiner, Eduard von Winterstein	Historical	
Das wiedergefundene Paradies	Walter Ruttmann		Animation	
The Wife of Forty Years	Richard Oswald	Diana Karenne, Vladimir Gajdarov	Drama	
The Wig	Berthold Viertel	Otto Gebühr, Jenny Hasselquist	Comedy	
A Woman for 24 Hours	Reinhold Schünzel	Lotte Neumann, Harry Liedtke	Drama	
The Woman from Berlin	Lorand von Kabdebo	Werner Krauss, Lia Eibenschütz	Drama	
The Woman Who Did	Benjamin Christensen	Lionel Barrymore, Gustav Fröhlich	Drama	
The Woman with That Certain Something	Erich Schönfelder	Rudolf Lettinger, Lee Parry	Silent	
The Woman without Money	Fritz Kaufmann	Grete Reinwald, Margarete Kupfer	Silent	
Women of Luxury	Erich Schönfelder	Lee Parry, Hans Albers	Comedy	
Women Who Fall by the Wayside	Géza von Bolváry	Ellen Kürti, Olaf Fjord	Drama	
Women You Rarely Greet	Frederic Zelnik	Lya Mara, Alfons Fryland	Silent	
Wood Love	Hans Neumann	Werner Krauss, Valeska Gert	Comedy	
Written in the Stars	Willy Reiber	Maria Minzenti, John Mylong	Silent	
Wunder der Schöpfung	Hanns Walter Kornblum		sci-fi	
Your Desire Is Sin	Franz Seitz	Maria Minzenti, John Mylong	Drama	
Zigano	Harry Piel	Harry Piel, Denise Legeay, Dary Holm	Adventure	Co-production with France
Zum Schneegipfel Afrikas	Carl Heinz Boese		documentary	
