= The Blonde Hannele =

1924 film

- Directed by: Franz Seitz
- Starring: Maria Mindzenty; Carl de Vogt; Helena Makowska
- Cinematography: Karl Attenberger; Mutz Greenbaum
- Production company: Münchner Lichtspielkunst
- Distributed by: Bavaria Film
- Release date: 28 November 1924
- Running time: 86 minutes
- Country: Germany
- Languages: Silent; German intertitles

The Blonde Hannele (German: Die blonde Hannele) is a 1924 German silent romance film directed by Franz Seitz and starring Maria Mindzenty, Carl de Vogt, and Helena Makowska. It was made at the Emelka Studios in Munich.

== Cast ==
- Maria Mindzenty
- Carl de Vogt as Walter Bergson
- Helena Makowska as Gräfin Blanche Raven
- Hans Brausewetter as Christoph
- Karl Falkenberg as Clary
- Ferdinand Martini as Lindenwirt
- Georg H. Schnell as Fürst

== Bibliography ==
- Bock, Hans-Michael; Bergfelder, Tim, eds. (2009). The Concise Cinegraph: Encyclopaedia of German Cinema. New York: Berghahn Books. ISBN 978-1-57181-655-9.
