= Venetian Lovers =

1925 film

- Directed by: Walter Niebuhr; Frank A. Tilley
- Written by: Philip Gibbs (novel); Frank A. Tilley
- Starring: Arlette Marchal; Hugh Miller; John Mylong
- Cinematography: Gaetano di Ventimiglia
- Production company: Münchner Lichtspielkunst
- Distributed by: Phillips (UK); Bavaria Film (Germany)
- Release date: 31 December 1925
- Country: Germany
- Languages: Silent; English intertitles

Venetian Lovers is a 1925 German silent drama film directed by Walter Niebuhr and Frank A. Tilley and starring Arlette Marchal, Hugh Miller and John Mylong.

The film's art direction was by Willy Reiber. It was made at the Emelka Studios in Munich.

== Cast ==
- Arlette Marchal as Countess Lola Astoni
- Hugh Miller as Count Astoni
- John Mylong as Chevalier Tomasso
- John Stuart as Bob Goring
- Margarete Schlegel as Marquita
- Maria Mindzenty as Betty Bradshaw
- Ben Field as William P. Bradshaw
- Eva Westlake as Mrs. Bradshaw
- Georg H. Schnell as Sir Harcourt

== Bibliography ==
- Palmer, Scott. British Film Actors' Credits, 1895-1987. McFarland, 1988.
