= Your Desire Is Sin =

1925 film

- Directed by: Franz Seitz
- Written by: Alfred Schirokauer; Franz Seitz
- Starring: Maria Mindzenty; Otto Framer; John Mylong
- Cinematography: Franz Koch
- Production company: Münchner Lichtspielkunst
- Distributed by: Bavaria Film
- Release date: 1925
- Country: Germany
- Languages: Silent; German intertitles

Your Desire Is Sin (German: Dein Begehren ist Sünde ...) is a 1925 German silent drama film directed by Franz Seitz and starring Maria Mindzenty, Otto Framer and John Mylong.

The film's sets were designed by the art director Max Heilbronn. It was shot at the Emelka Studios in Munich.

== Cast ==
- Maria Mindzenty as Schwester Beate
- Otto Framer as Henrik Kellquist
- John Mylong as Felix Dubois
- Ferdinand Martini as Dr. Moebius
- Georg H. Schnell
- Max Weydner

== Bibliography ==
- Paolo Caneppele. Entscheidungen der Wiener Filmzensur: 1922-1925. Filmarchiv Austria, 2002.
