= Ludwig Reiber =

German art director (1904–1979)

- Born: 4 August 1904; Munich, Bavaria, German Empire
- Died: 15 September 1979 (aged 75); Munich, Bavaria, West Germany
- Occupation: Art director
- Years active: 1925-1970 (film)

Ludwig Reiber (1904–1979) was a German art director. The veteran Reiber worked on film and television set design from the silent era to the early 1970s. He was employed by the Munich-based Bavaria Film at the Emelka Studios. He worked on two Alfred Hitchcock films during the 1920s that were shot at Emekla. Following the Second World War he was employed on several European-made Hollywood productions such as Decision Before Dawn and Paths of Glory.

== Selected filmography ==
- The Shot in the Pavilion (1925)
- Mrs Worrington's Perfume (1925)
- The Adventurous Wedding (1925)
- The Pleasure Garden (1925)
- Our Emden (1926)
- Little Inge and Her Three Fathers (1926)
- The Hunter of Fall (1926)
- The Mountain Eagle (1926)
- Valencia (1927)
- Did You Fall in Love Along the Beautiful Rhine? (1927)
- Storm Tide (1927)
- My Heidelberg, I Can Not Forget You (1927)
- Restless Hearts (1928)
- Behind Monastery Walls (1928)
- The Foreign Legionnaire (1928)
- Spy of Madame Pompadour (1928)
- The Gambling Den of Montmartre (1928)
- A Better Master (1928)
- Love on Skis (1928)
- Waterloo (1929)
- The Chaste Coquette (1929)
- When the White Lilacs Bloom Again (1929)
- Love and Champagne (1930)
- Boycott (1930)
- The Love Express (1931)
- The Champion Shot (1932)
- Grandstand for General Staff (1932)
- A Woman Like You (1933)
- Lady Windermere's Fan (1935)
- A Doctor of Conviction (1936)
- The Girl Irene (1936)
- Augustus the Strong (1936)
- The Yellow Flag (1937)
- Land of Love (1937)
- The Mystery of Betty Bonn (1938)
- Water for Canitoga (1939)
- Detours to Happiness (1939)
- The Eternal Spring (1940)
- The Sinful Village (1940)
- The Fire Devil (1940)
- Comrades (1941)
- The Girl from Fano (1941)
- To Be God One Time (1942)
- The Dark Day (1943)
- Tonelli (1943)
- Orient Express (1944)
- Regimental Music (1950)
- Decision Before Dawn (1951)
- Nights on the Road (1952)
- Illusion in a Minor Key (1952)
- Monks, Girls and Hungarian Soldiers (1952)
- The Night Without Morals (1953)
- Portrait of an Unknown Woman (1954)
- Through the Forests and Through the Trees (1956)
- Paths of Glory (1957)
- Salzburg Stories (1957)
- Rommel Calls Cairo (1959)

== Bibliography ==
- Capua, Michelangelo. Anatole Litvak: The Life and Films. McFarland, 2015.
