= Left of the Isar, Right of the Spree (1929 film) =

1929 film directed by Franz Seitz

- Hella Helios and Walter Grüters
- German: Links der Isar – rechts der Spree
- Directed by: Franz Seitz
- Written by: Joseph Dalman
- Cinematography: Franz Koch
- Music by: Werner Schmidt-Boelcke
- Production company: Münchner Lichtspielkunst
- Distributed by: Bavaria Film
- Release date: 27 August 1929
- Country: Germany
- Languages: Silent; German intertitles

Left of the Isar, Right of the Spree (German: Links der Isar – rechts der Spree) is a 1929 German silent film directed by Franz Seitz. It was made at the Emelka Studios in Munich. The film's sets were designed by Ludwig Reiber.

A 1940 film was made with the same title.

== Cast ==
In alphabetical order

- Karl Flemisch
- Walter Grüters
- Hella Helios
- Georgia Lind
- Maria Meyerhofer
- Albert Paulig
- Weiß Ferdl
