= The Lion of Venice (film) =

1924 film

- Directed by: Paul L. Stein
- Written by: Alfred Schirokauer
- Starring: Olaf Fjord; Grete Reinwald; Hanni Weisse
- Cinematography: Willi Kiermeier; Franz Koch
- Production company: Münchner Lichtspielkunst
- Distributed by: Bavaria Film
- Release date: 1924
- Country: Germany
- Languages: Silent; German intertitles

The Lion of Venice (German: Der Löwe von Venedig) is a 1924 German silent film directed by Paul L. Stein and starring Olaf Fjord, Grete Reinwald and Hanni Weisse.

The film's art direction was by Willy Reiber. It was made at the Emelka Studios in Munich.

== Cast ==
- Olaf Fjord
- Grete Reinwald
- Hanni Weisse
- Paul Biensfeldt
- Wilhelm Diegelmann
- Fritz Greiner
