= The Secret of One Hour =

1926 film

- Directed by: Max Obal
- Written by: Max Ferner
- Produced by: Ernst Reicher
- Starring: Ernst Reicher; Helena Makowska; Hilde Horst
- Production company: Münchner Lichtspielkunst
- Release date: 4 February 1926
- Country: Germany
- Languages: Silent; German intertitles

The Secret of One Hour (German: Das Geheimnis einer Stunde) is a 1926 German silent crime film directed by Max Obal and starring Ernst Reicher, Helena Makowska and Hilde Horst. It is part of the series of films portraying the detective character Stuart Webbs.

It was shot at the Emelka Studios in Munich.

== Cast ==
- Ernst Reicher as Stuart Webbs
- Helena Makowska as Geraldine Kreagh
- Hilde Horst as Ethel - Geraldines Schwester
- Hermann Nesselträger as Winston Horward
- Gustav Ingo-Schröter
- Otto Kronburger
- Hermann Pfanz as Polizeikommisar
- Ferdinand Martini as John
- Klara Ney
- Manfred Koempel-Pilot

== Bibliography ==
- Rainey, Buck. Serials and Series: A World Filmography, 1912-1956. McFarland, 2015.
