= The Duke of Reichstadt =

The Duke of Reichstadt may refer to:

- The Duke of Reichstadt (1920 film), an Austrian silent film
- The Duke of Reichstadt (1931 film), a French-German historical drama film
- Duke of Reichstadt or Napoleon II
