= The Terror of the Sea =

1924 film

- Directed by: Franz Osten
- Written by: John Mylong
- Starring: Carl de Vogt; Helena Makowska; Cläre Lotto
- Cinematography: Franz Koch
- Production company: Münchner Lichtspielkunst
- Distributed by: Süd-Film
- Release date: 10 November 1924
- Country: Germany
- Languages: Silent; German intertitles

The Terror of the Sea (German: Der Schrecken des Meeres) is a 1924 German silent film directed by Franz Osten and starring Carl de Vogt, Helena Makowska, and Cläre Lotto.

The film's sets were designed by the art director Max Heilbronner. It was shot at the Emelka Studios in Munich.

== Cast ==
- Carl de Vogt
- Helena Makowska
- John Mylong
- Cläre Lotto
- Lilian Gray
- Georg H. Schnell
- Irma Socha

== Bibliography ==
- Bock, Hans-Michael; Bergfelder, Tim, eds. (2009). The Concise Cinegraph: Encyclopaedia of German Cinema. New York: Berghahn Books. ISBN 978-1-57181-655-9.
