= Hidden Fires (1925 film) =

1925 film

- Directed by: Einar Bruun
- Written by: Patrick Macgnil
- Starring: Alfons Fryland; Mary Nolan; Lisa Deihle
- Cinematography: Toni Frenguelli; Franz Koch
- Production company: Münchner Lichtspielkunst
- Distributed by: Bavaria Film
- Release date: 1925
- Country: Germany
- Languages: Silent; German intertitles

Hidden Fires (German: Verborgene Gluten) is a 1925 German silent film directed by Einar Bruun and starring Alfons Fryland, Mary Nolan, and Lisa Deihle. It was made at the Emelka Studios in Munich.

== Cast ==
- Alfons Fryland as Jack Bruce
- Mary Nolan as Ias, Jacks Wife
- Lisa Deihle as Dickie, their son
- Ferdinand Martini as Danham
- Gertrude McCoy as Olive Clayton
- Georg H. Schnell as Guipe Golding
- Gloria Sved as Estela

== Bibliography ==
- Gottlieb, Sidney; Brookhouse, Christopher, eds. (2002). Framing Hitchcock: Selected Essays from the Hitchcock Annual. Detroit: Wayne State University Press. ISBN 978-0-8143-3061-6.
