= A Better Master =

1928 film

- Willi Forst and Elisabeth Pinajeff
- German: Ein besserer Herr
- Directed by: Gustav Ucicky
- Written by: Walter Hasenclever (play); Thilde Förster
- Starring: Leo Peukert; Lydia Potechina; Willi Forst
- Cinematography: Franz Koch
- Music by: Hansheinrich Dransmann
- Production company: Münchner Lichtspielkunst
- Distributed by: Bavaria Film
- Release date: 28 August 1928
- Country: Germany
- Languages: Silent; German intertitles

A Better Master (German: Ein besserer Herr) is a 1928 German silent comedy film directed by Gustav Ucicky and starring Leo Peukert, Lydia Potechina and Willi Forst. It is based upon the play by Walter Hasenclever.

It was made at the Emelka Studios in Munich. The film's sets were designed by the art director Ludwig Reiber.

== Cast ==
- Leo Peukert as Milliardär Kompaß
- Lydia Potechina as Seine Frau
- Rita Roberts as Seine Tochter
- Fritz Kampers as Möbius, ein Heiratsschwindler
- Elisabeth Pinajeff as Madame Prandon, eine Tänzerin
- Karl Graumann as Schmettau, ein Detektiv
- Gustl Helminger as Frau Schnütchen, eine Witwe
- Willi Forst as Sohn von Kompaß
