= Spy of Madame Pompadour =

1928 film directed by Karl Grune

- Agnes Esterhazy and Liane Haid
- Directed by: Karl Grune
- Written by: Max Ferner; Bobby E. Lüthge
- Starring: Liane Haid; Fritz Kortner; Alfred Gerasch
- Cinematography: Fritz Arno Wagner
- Music by: Leo Fall; Werner Schmidt-Boelcke
- Production company: Münchner Lichtspielkunst
- Distributed by: Bavaria Film
- Release date: 6 September 1928
- Country: Germany
- Languages: Silent; German intertitles

Spy of Madame Pompadour (German: Marquis d'Eon, der Spion der Pompadour) is a 1928 German silent film directed by Karl Grune and starring Liane Haid, Fritz Kortner and Alfred Gerasch. It portrays the life of the eighteenth century figure Marquis d'Eon. It was made at the Emelka Studios in Munich by Bavaria Film. The film's sets were designed by the art directors Ludwig Reiber and Willy Reiber.

== Cast ==
- Liane Haid as Marquis d'Eon
- Fritz Kortner as Zar Paul von Rußland
- Alfred Gerasch as Louis XV - König von Frankreich
- Agnes Esterhazy as Madame Pompadour
- Mona Maris as Die Zarin
- Dene Morel as Lord Hatfield
- Karl Graumann as Prinz Conti
- Nikolai Malikoff as Der russische Gesandte
- Philipp Manning as Der Großfürst

== Bibliography ==
- Klossner, Michael. The Europe of 1500-1815 on Film and Television: A Worldwide Filmography of Over 2550 Works, 1895 Through 2000. McFarland & Company, 2002.
