= The Gambling Den of Montmartre =

1928 German film

- Directed by: Willy Reiber; Franz Seitz
- Written by: Joseph Dalman
- Starring: Eric Barclay; Suzy Vernon; Maurice de Féraudy
- Cinematography: Franz Koch
- Production company: Münchner Lichtspielkunst
- Distributed by: Bavaria Film
- Release date: 17 May 1928
- Country: Germany
- Languages: Silent; German intertitles

The Gambling Den of Montmartre (German: Die Hölle von Montmartre) is a 1928 German silent film directed by Willy Reiber and Franz Seitz and starring Eric Barclay, Suzy Vernon and Maurice de Féraudy.

The film's sets were designed by the art director Ludwig Reiber. It was made at the Emelka Studios in Munich.

== Cast ==
- Eric Barclay as Der Straßenspieler
- Suzy Vernon as Suzy
- Maurice de Féraudy as Der alte Sonderling
- Carmen Cartellieri as Die Zimmervermieterin
- Max Weydner as Der Kellner
- Hans Bauer as Der Einbrecher
- Otto Wernicke as Der Apache
- Hermi Lutz as Der Pikkolo

== Bibliography ==
- Bock, Hans-Michael & Bergfelder, Tim. The Concise CineGraph. Encyclopedia of German Cinema. Berghahn Books, 2009.
