= Maciste and the Chinese Chest =

1923 film directed by Carl Boese

- Directed by: Carl Boese
- Written by: Richard Hutter
- Produced by: Jakob Karol
- Starring: Bartolomeo Pagano; Rudolf Lettinger; Jakob Tiedtke
- Cinematography: Max Grix; Ludwig Lippert
- Production company: Jakob Karol Film
- Release date: 1 July 1923
- Running time: 60 minutes
- Country: Germany
- Languages: Silent; German intertitles

Maciste and the Chinese Chest (German: Maciste und die chinesische Truhe) is a 1923 German silent action film directed by Carl Boese and starring Bartolomeo Pagano, Rudolf Lettinger, and Jakob Tiedtke. It was one of several German films featuring the Italian peplum hero Maciste.

The film's sets were designed by the art director Fritz Kraenke and Willy Reiber.

== Cast ==
- Bartolomeo Pagano as Maciste
- Rudolf Lettinger
- Edwin H. Knopf
- Elsie Fuller
- Toni Wittels
- Karl Falkenberg
- Ferdinand Martini
- Jakob Tiedtke
- Gerhard Ritterband
- Li Chun Di
- Sybill Morel
- Nien Tso Ling
- Grete Hollmann

== Bibliography ==
- Kinnard, Roy; Crnkovich, Tony (2017). Italian Sword and Sandal Films, 1908–1990. Jefferson, NC: McFarland. ISBN 978-1-4766-2704-5.
- Nicolella, Henry; Soister, John T. (2013). Many Selves: The Horror and Fantasy Films of Paul Wegener. Duncan, OK: BearManor Media. ISBN 978-1-59393-271-8.
