= The Tannhof Women =

1934 film directed by Franz Seitz

- Directed by: Franz Seitz
- Written by: Joseph Dalman (novel)
- Starring: Rudolf Klein-Rogge; Paul Richter; Ursula Grabley
- Cinematography: Franz Koch
- Music by: Toni Thoms
- Production companies: Arnold & Richter GmbH
- Release date: 21 December 1934
- Country: Germany
- Language: German

The Tannhof Women (German: Die Frauen vom Tannhof) is a 1934 German drama film directed by Franz Seitz and starring Rudolf Klein-Rogge, Paul Richter and Ursula Grabley. It was distributed in America in 1936 and reviewed by The New York Times.

== Synopsis ==
For more than a hundred years a curse has seemingly hung over the Tanhoff family. Due to the hard-heartedness of one of their ancestors, all the woman of the family die in childbirth. Hertha, a self-confident city girl marrying the heir to the Tanhoff estate, tries to overcome the family's fears about the curse.

== Cast ==
- Rudolf Klein-Rogge as Jakob Aigner, der Tannenhofbauer
- Paul Richter as Hans Aigner, sein Sohn
- Marianne Wehmer as Agnes Baumann
- Ursula Grabley as Hertha Richter
- Josef Eichheim as Michel, Knecht auf dem Tannenhof
- Walter Holten as Max Lankes
- Käte Merk as Else Lankes, seine Frau
- Rosa Kirchner-Lang as Regine, Wirtschafterin des Tannenhofes
- Franz Sigg as Weinberger, Wirt des Unterkunftshauses

== Bibliography ==
- Klaus, Ulrich J. Deutsche Tonfilme: Jahrgang 1934. Klaus-Archiv, 1988.
- Waldman, Harry. Nazi Films In America, 1933-1942. McFarland & Co, 2008.
