= The Women's War (film) =

1928 film directed by Franz Seitz

- Directed by: Franz Seitz
- Written by: Ludwig Anzengruber (play); Joseph Dalman
- Starring: Fritz Kampers; Liane Haid; Lotte Lorring
- Cinematography: Franz Koch
- Music by: Hansheinrich Dransmann
- Production company: Münchner Lichtspielkunst
- Distributed by: Bavaria Film
- Release date: 18 September 1928
- Country: Germany
- Languages: Silent; German intertitles

The Women's War (German: Der Weiberkrieg) is a 1928 German silent film directed by Franz Seitz and starring Fritz Kampers, Liane Haid and Lotte Lorring. It is based upon the play by Ludwig Anzengruber.

It was made at the Emelka Studios in Munich for release by Bavaria Film. The film's sets were designed by the art director August Rinaldi.

== Cast ==
- Fritz Kampers as Der Gelbhofbauer
- Liane Haid as Josefa, seine Frau
- Lotte Lorring as Liesel, Kellnerin
- Hans Albrecht as Der Altlechner
- Henriette Speidel as Die Altlechnerin
- Heinz Könecke as Der junge Altlechner
- Erta Linde as Reserl, Seine Frau
- Ferdinand Martini as Der Steinklopferhans
- Josef Eichheim as Der Brenninger
- Johanna Schwarz as Die Brenningerin

== Bibliography ==
Thomas Elsaesser & Michael Wedel. A Second Life: German Cinema's First Decades. Amsterdam University Press, 1996.
