= There Were Two Bachelors =

1936 German film directed by Franz Seitz

- Directed by: Franz Seitz
- Written by: Joe Stöckel; Joseph Dalman
- Produced by: August Arnold; Robert Richter
- Starring: Manfred Koempel-Pilot; Adolf Gondrell; Adele Sandrock
- Cinematography: Otto Martini
- Music by: Toni Thoms
- Production company: ARRI
- Release date: 12 June 1936
- Country: Germany
- Language: German

There Were Two Bachelors (German: Es waren zwei Junggesellen) is a 1936 German comedy film directed by Franz Seitz and starring Manfred Koempel-Pilot, Adolf Gondrell and Joe Stöckel.

== Synopsis ==
A young doctor and his architect friend arrive in a small town to take over the medical practice of his uncle. All the locals stay away at first, but he eventually succeeds in turning the practice into a successful spa. In the process they both find love.

== Cast ==
- Manfred Koempel-Pilot as Dr. Manfred Loberg
- Adolf Gondrell as Karl Mohr, Architekt, sein Freund
- Joe Stöckel as Simon Hummel - Faktotum bei Loberg
- Helma Rückert as Monika, dessen Frau
- Adele Sandrock as Frau Adele von Gronau
- Philipp Veit as Neubert, Apotheker
- Käthe Itter as Charlotte - dessen Tochter
- Hilde Schneider as Trude Peters - Frau von Gronaus Nichte
- Otto Fassler as Nikolaus - Chauffeur bei Frau von Gronau
- Harry Hertzsch as Der Bürgermeister
- Philipp Weichand as Hänfling, ein Bürger
- Theodor Autzinger as Huber, Gemeindesekretär
- Wastl Witt as Der Berghofbauer
- Elisabeth Reich as Anna

== Bibliography ==
- Bock, Hans-Michael & Bergfelder, Tim. The Concise Cinegraph: Encyclopaedia of German Cinema. Berghahn Books, 2009.
