= When the White Lilacs Bloom Again (1929 film) =

1929 film

- Swedish poster
- Directed by: Robert Wohlmuth
- Written by: Joseph Dalman; Franz Doelle; Fritz Rotter
- Starring: Georg Henrich; Vera Schmiterlöw; Gaston Jacquet
- Cinematography: Franz Koch
- Production company: Münchner Lichtspielkunst
- Distributed by: Bavaria Film
- Release date: 25 June 1929
- Running time: 95 minutes
- Country: Germany
- Languages: Silent; German intertitles

When the White Lilacs Bloom Again (German: Wenn der weiße Flieder wieder blüht) is a 1929 German silent romance film directed by Robert Wohlmuth and starring Georg Henrich, Vera Schmiterlöw and Walter Grüters. It takes its title from a popular song of the era. A 1953 film was made using the same name.

It was made at the Emelka Studios in Munich. The film's sets were designed by Ludwig Reiber.

== Cast ==
- Georg Henrich as v. Zandten
- Vera Schmiterlöw as Else von Zandten
- Walter Grüters as Dr. Paul Horst
- Gaston Jacquet as van der Gaarden
- Julius Riedmueller as Anton Marr
- Ferdinand Martini as Diener

== Bibliography ==
- Alfred Krautz. International directory of cinematographers, set- and costume designers in film, Volume 4. Saur, 1984.
