= Love of Life (film) =

1924 film directed by Georg Asagaroff

- Directed by: Georg Asagaroff
- Written by: Georg Asagaroff
- Starring: Georg H. Schnell; Olga Gzovskaya; Helena Makowska
- Cinematography: Franz Koch; Wilhelm Kiermeier
- Production company: Münchner Lichtspielkunst
- Distributed by: Bayerische Film
- Release date: 10 October 1924
- Country: Germany
- Languages: Silent; German intertitles

Love of Life (German: Liebet das Leben) is a 1924 German silent film directed by Georg Asagaroff and starring Georg H. Schnell, Olga Gzovskaya and Helena Makowska.

The film's sets were designed by the art director Willy Reiber. It was shot at the Emelka Studios in Munich.

== Cast ==
- Georg H. Schnell as Thomas Brey
- Olga Gzovskaya as Allan, dessen Nichte
- Helena Makowska as Lucienne d’Or
- Harry Reve as Boxer Harry
- Vladimir Gajdarov
- Toni Wittels

== Bibliography ==
- Alfred Krautz. International directory of cinematographers, set- and costume designers in film, Volume 4. Saur, 1984.
