= Max Ferner =

Max Ferner was a German playwright, born Maximilian Sommer on 18 April 1881. He died in Munich at the age of 59 on 9 October 1940.

Ferner teamed up with his friend Max Neal to write librettos for two operettas for the Austrian composer Karl Michael Ziehrer, which were performed in September 1913 and again in February 1916.

Ferner also wrote and co-wrote with Neal a series of plays, many of which were later converted to movies.

== Plays ==
- Der müde Theodor (1913, co-author Max Neal)
- Fürst Casimir, operetta by Karl Michael Ziehrer (1913, co-author Max Neal)
- Im siebenten Himmel, operetta by Karl Michael Ziehrer (1916, co-author Max Neal)
- Die drei Dorfheiligen (1920, co-author Max Neal)
- Der Hunderter im Westentaschl (1935, co-author Max Neal)

== Filmography ==
- Der müde Theodor (1918, based on the play Der müde Theodor)
- Trötte Teodor (Sweden, 1931, based on the play Der müde Theodor)
- Service de nuit (France, 1932, based on the play Der müde Theodor)
- Der müde Theodor (1936, based on the play Der müde Theodor)
- Thunder, Lightning and Sunshine (1936, based on the play Der Hunderter im Westentaschl)
- Trötte Teodor (Sweden, 1945, based on the play Der müde Theodor)
- Die drei Dorfheiligen (1949, based on the play Die drei Dorfheiligen)
- Tired Theodore (1957, based on the play Der müde Theodor)

=== Screenwriter ===
- A Song from Days of Youth (1925)
- The Shot in the Pavilion (1925)
- Marccos erste Liebe (1925)
- The Secret of One Hour (1926)
- The Seventh Son (1926)
- Secret Sinners (1926)
- I Lost My Heart in Heidelberg (1926)
- The Mountain Eagle (1927)
- Valencia (1927)
- My Heidelberg, I Can Not Forget You (1927)
- The Foreign Legionnaire (1928)
- Spy of Madame Pompadour (1928)
- Restless Hearts (1928)
- The Fate of the House of Habsburg (1928)
- Behind Monastery Walls (1928)
- Waterloo (1929)
- In einer kleinen Konditorei (1930)
- Im Banne der Berge (1931)
- At the Strasbourg (1934)
