= Klettermaxe (1927 film) =

1927 film

- Directed by: Willy Reiber
- Written by: Hermanna Barkhausen; Hans Mahner-Mons (novel)
- Starring: Dorothea Wieck; Corry Bell; Paul Heidemann
- Cinematography: Karl Attenberger; Artur von Schwertführer
- Music by: Hans May
- Production company: Emelka Film
- Distributed by: Süd-Film
- Release date: 11 March 1927
- Country: Germany
- Languages: Silent; German intertitles

Klettermaxe is a 1927 German silent crime film directed by Willy Reiber and starring Dorothea Wieck, Corry Bell and Paul Heidemann. The story was remade as a sound film in 1952.

== Film production ==
It was made at the Bavaria Studios in Munich. The film's sets were designed by the art director Max Heilbronner.

== Synopsis ==
A masked figure climbs into the apartments of burglars and robs them of their stolen goods.

== Cast ==
- Dorothea Wieck, as Toni Höppner
- Corry Bell, as Corry Bell
- Ruth Weyher
- Paul Heidemann
- Carl Walther Meyer
- Margarete Kupfer
- Hans Adalbert Schlettow
- Robert Garrison
- Philipp Manning
- Harry Hardt
- Albert Paulig
- Lilian Weiß
- Fritz Greiner
- Neumann-Schüler

== Bibliography ==
- Bock, Hans-Michael & Bergfelder, Tim. The Concise Cinegraph: Encyclopaedia of German Cinema. Berghahn Books, 2009.
