= The Foreign Legionnaire =

1928 film directed by James Bauer

- Directed by: James Bauer
- Written by: Max Ferner
- Starring: Dorothea Wieck; Ferdinand Martini; Therese Giehse
- Cinematography: Franz Koch
- Music by: Alexander Schirmann
- Production company: Münchner Lichtspielkunst
- Distributed by: Bavaria Film
- Release date: 1 March 1928
- Country: Germany
- Languages: Silent; German intertitles

The Foreign Legionnaire (German: Fremdenlegionär) is a 1928 German silent adventure film directed by James Bauer and starring Dorothea Wieck, Ferdinand Martini and Therese Giehse. It was made at the Emelka Studios in Munich. Location shooting took place in Spanish Morocco. The film's sets were designed by the art director Ludwig Reiber.

== Cast ==
- Dorothea Wieck as Lore
- Ferdinand Martini as Der Vater
- Therese Giehse as Die Mutter
- Oskar Marion as Karl Rittner
- Rolf Pinegger as Sein Vater
- Gustav Fröhlich as Martin Frey
- Joop van Hulzen as Legionär Mac Roy
- Manfred Voss as Ein junger Franzose
- Rio Nobile as Französischer Offizier

== Bibliography ==
- Bock, Hans-Michael & Bergfelder, Tim. The Concise Cinegraph: Encyclopaedia of German Cinema. Berghahn Books, 2009.
