= Behind Monastery Walls (1928 film) =

1928 film directed by Franz Seitz

- Directed by: Franz Seitz
- Written by: Anton Ohorn (play); Max Ferner
- Starring: Karl Neubert; Georg Jacoby; Georg Henrich
- Cinematography: Franz Koch
- Production company: Münchner Lichtspielkunst
- Distributed by: Bavaria Film
- Release date: 10 December 1928
- Country: Germany
- Languages: Silent; German intertitles

Behind Monastery Walls (German: Hinter Klostermauern) is a 1928 German silent drama film directed by Franz Seitz and starring Karl Neubert, Georg Jacoby and Georg Henrich.

The film's sets were designed by Ludwig Reiber. It was shot at the Bavaria Studios in Munich.

== Cast ==
- Karl Neubert as Abt
- Georg Jacoby as Neuer Abt
- Georg Henrich as Prior
- Karl Graumann as Bruder Simon
- Carl de Vogt as Bruder Meinrad
- Ferdinand Martini as Bruder Servan
- Josef Eichheim as Bruder Fridolin
- Dene Morel as Novize Paulus
- Philipp Manning as Döbler
- Elise Aulinger as Frau Aulinger
- Anita Dorris as Ihre Tochter
- Franz Loskarn as Franz, Tischlergeselle
- Rolf Pinegger as Birkmann, Förster
- Betty Bird as Käthe, seine Tochter
- Weiß Ferdl as Bruder Baptist

== Bibliography ==
- Bock, Hans-Michael; Bergfelder, Tim, eds. (2009). The Concise Cinegraph: Encyclopaedia of German Cinema. New York: Berghahn Books. ISBN 978-1-57181-655-9.
