= Love and Champagne =

1930 film

- Directed by: Robert Land
- Written by: Ladislaus Vajda; Andor Zsoldos
- Produced by: Herman Millakowsky; Sigfried Unger
- Starring: Camilla von Hollay; Iván Petrovich; Brita Appelgren
- Cinematography: Mutz Greenbaum; Franz Koch
- Music by: Werner Schmidt-Boelcke
- Production company: Greenbaum-Film
- Distributed by: Bavaria Film
- Release date: 24 April 1930
- Running time: 80 minutes
- Country: Germany
- Language: German

Love and Champagne (German: Liebe und Champagner) is a 1930 German comedy drama film directed by Robert Land and starring Camilla von Hollay, Iván Petrovich, and Brita Appelgren. It was shot at the Emelka Studios in Munich and on location around Eibsee in Bavaria. The film's sets were designed by the art director Ludwig Reiber.

== Synopsis ==
While stating in a winter sports resort, Fritz von Hornthal attracts the attention of a number of the woman there as a distinguished man-about-town. These come to include both the ingenue Sybil and her more worldly, sophisticated mother Lucie. Her mother pretends to her daughter that Fritz is an old flame of hers and that she may even be his daughter in an attempt to put him off. Sybil is left so miserable that her mother relents and gives him up.

== Cast ==
- Camilla von Hollay as Eleonore Niewitz
- Iván Petrovich as Fritz von Hornthal
- Brita Appelgren as Sybil
- Ernõ Szenes as Paul Grill
- Agnes Esterhazy as Lucie Forst
- Rina Marsa as Eine Dame

== Bibliography ==
- Bock, Hans-Michael; Bergfelder, Tim, eds. (2009). The Concise Cinegraph: Encyclopaedia of German Cinema. New York: Berghahn Books. ISBN 978-1-57181-655-9.
