= The Path to God =

1924 film directed by Franz Seitz

- Directed by: Franz Seitz
- Written by: Alfred Schirokauer; Franz Seitz
- Starring: Agnes Straub; Eduard von Winterstein
- Cinematography: Friedrich Weinmann
- Music by: Bruno Schulz
- Production company: Münchner Lichtspielkunst
- Distributed by: Bavaria Film
- Release date: 27 May 1924
- Country: Germany
- Languages: Silent; German intertitles

The Path to God (German: Der Weg zu Gott) is a 1924 German silent film directed by Franz Seitz and starring Agnes Straub and Eduard von Winterstein. It was made by Bavaria Film at the Emelka Studios in Munich.

The film's art direction was by Max Heilbronner. It was shot at the Emelka Studios in Munich.

== Cast ==
In alphabetical order

- Friedrich Basil
- Paul Biensfeldt
- Wilhelm Diegelmann
- Olaf Fjord
- Fritz Kampers
- Rosa Lang
- Ferdinand Martini
- Maria Mindzenty as Mary
- Heinz Rolf Münz
- Agnes Straub as Katharine
- Eduard von Winterstein as Thomas Balt

== Bibliography ==
- Grange, William. Cultural Chronicle of the Weimar Republic. Scarecrow Press, 2008.
