= The Chaste Coquette =

1929 film directed by Franz Seitz

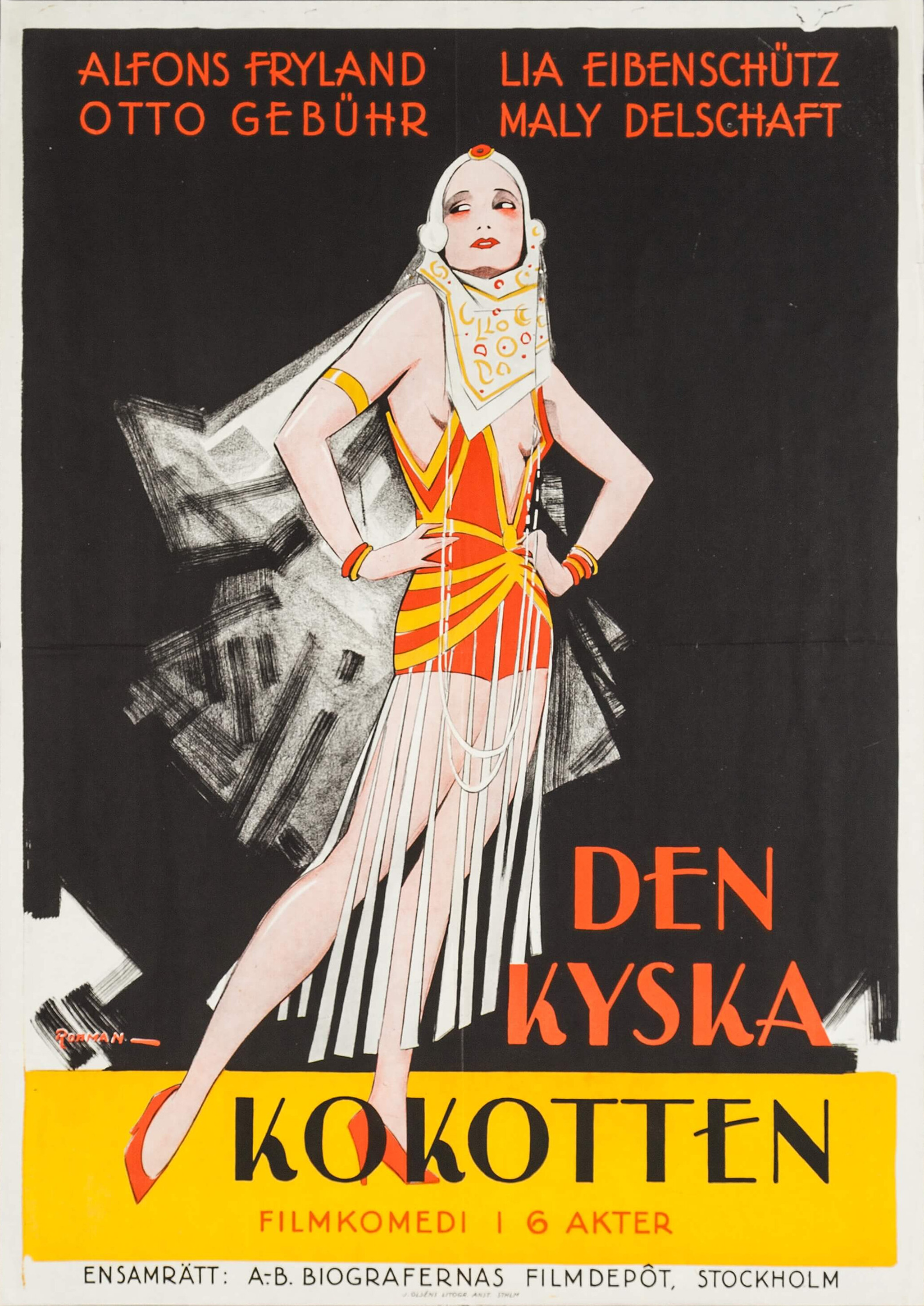
- Swedish theatrical release poster
- Directed by: Franz Seitz
- Written by: Franz Weichenmayr
- Produced by: Max Schach
- Starring: Maly Delschaft; Alfons Fryland; Otto Gebühr
- Cinematography: Franz Koch
- Music by: Werner Schmidt-Boelcke
- Production company: Münchner Lichtspielkunst
- Distributed by: Bavaria Film
- Release date: 20 March 1929
- Country: Germany
- Languages: Silent; German intertitles

The Chaste Coquette (German: Die keusche Kokotte) is a 1929 German silent film directed by Franz Seitz and starring Maly Delschaft, Alfons Fryland, and Otto Gebühr. It was made at the Emelka Studios in Munich. The film's sets were designed by Ludwig Reiber.

== Cast ==
In alphabetical order

- Maly Delschaft
- Lia Eibenschütz
- Alfons Fryland
- Otto Gebühr
- Ines Monlosa

== Bibliography ==
- Beyer, Friedemann (1992). Die Gesichter der UFA: Starportraits einer Epoche (in German). Munich: Heyne. ISBN 978-3-453-05971-9.
