= The Seventh Son (film) =

1926 film

- German: Der siebente Junge
- Directed by: Franz Osten
- Written by: Max Ferner
- Starring: Maria Mindzenty; Ferdinand Martini; Carl Walther Meyer; Elise Aulinger
- Cinematography: Franz Koch
- Production company: Emelka Film
- Distributed by: Bavaria Film
- Release date: 23 March 1926
- Country: Germany
- Languages: Silent; German intertitles

The Seventh Son (German: Der siebente Junge) is a 1926 German silent drama film directed by Franz Osten and starring Maria Mindzenty, Ferdinand Martini and Carl Walther Meyer. It premiered in Berlin on 23 March 1926.

It was shot at the Bavaria Studios in Munich.

== Cast ==
- Maria Mindzenty as Konstantine
- Ferdinand Martini as Wendelin Nimmersatt
- Carl Walther Meyer as Prince Arthur
- Elise Aulinger as Klothilde Nimmersatt
- Martin Lindemann as Fürst Clemens VIII
- Hilde Horst as Evchen Bergner
- Hermann Pfanz as Eusebius Riemenschneider
- Frau Heuberger-Schönemann as Ludmila
- John W. Lantz as Alter
- Manfred Koempel-Pilot
