= The Hunter of Fall (1926 film) =

1926 film directed by Franz Seitz

- Directed by: Franz Seitz
- Written by: Ludwig Ganghofer (novel); Franz Seitz
- Starring: Grete Reinwald; William Dieterle; Fritz Kampers
- Cinematography: Franz Koch
- Production company: Münchner Lichtspielkunst
- Distributed by: Süd-Film
- Release date: 12 November 1926
- Country: Germany
- Languages: Silent; German intertitles

The Hunter of Fall (German: Der Jäger von Fall) is a 1926 German silent drama film directed by Franz Seitz and starring Grete Reinwald, William Dieterle and Fritz Kampers. It is based on a novel of the same title by Ludwig Ganghofer which has been made into films several times.

It was made at the Emelka Studios in Munich. The film's sets were designed by Ludwig Reiber.

== Cast ==
- Grete Reinwald
- William Dieterle
- Fritz Kampers
- Ferdinand Martini
- Kaethe Consee
- Theodor Autzinger
- Julius Stettner

== Bibliography ==
- Astrid Pellengahr & Anja Ballis. Kehrseite eines Klischees: der Schriftsteller Ludwig Ganghofer. Bauer-Verlag, 2005.
