= Restless Hearts =

1928 film

- Spanish promotional poster
- Directed by: Benito Perojo; Gustav Ucicky
- Written by: Pedro Mata (novel); Santiago Aguilar; Max Ferner; Thilde Förster
- Starring: Betty Bird; Hanna Ralph; Livio Pavanelli; Imperio Argentina
- Cinematography: Franz Koch
- Production companies: Bavaria Film; Julio César
- Distributed by: Bavaria Film (Germany)
- Release date: 1 November 1928
- Countries: Germany; Spain
- Languages: Silent; German/Spanish intertitles

Restless Hearts (German: Herzen ohne Ziel, Spanish: Corazones sin rumbo) is a 1928 German-Spanish silent film directed by Benito Perojo and Gustav Ucicky and starring Betty Bird, Hanna Ralph and Livio Pavanelli.

The film was a co-production between a Spanish company and the German studio Bavaria Film. The Argentine actress Imperio Argentina was cast after winning a competition staged by the film's producers. The film was based on a novel by Pedro Mata. Art direction was by Ludwig Reiber.

On its release the film was attacked by Spanish critics who felt that the Spanish actors had been relegated to lesser roles.

== Cast ==
- Betty Bird as Maria Luise
- Hanna Ralph as Dolores Heredia
- Livio Pavanelli as Alfonso
- Imperio Argentina as Isabel
- Valentín Parera as Alcaraz
- Walter Grüters as Mac Stone
- M. W. Lenz as musician #1
- Franz Loskarn as musician #2
- Ferdinand Martini as 3musician #3
- Alfredo Hurtado
- Emilio Mesejo
- Iván Petrovich
