= The Testament of Billions =

1920 film directed by Franz Seitz

- Directed by: Franz Seitz
- Written by: Franz Seitz
- Production company: Union-Film
- Release date: 29 March 1920
- Country: Germany
- Languages: Silent; German intertitles

The Testament of Billions (German: Das Milliardentestament) is a 1920 German silent film directed by Franz Seitz.

== Cast ==
- Lili Dominici
- Ernst Rückert
- Albert Steinrück
- Fred Stranz

== Bibliography ==
- Cees de Jong. Jan Tschichold: Master Typographer : His Life, Work & Legacy. Thames & Hudson, 2008.
