= The Tragedy of a Night of Passion =

1924 film

- Directed by: Franz Osten
- Written by: John Mylong
- Starring: Carl de Vogt; John Mylong; Georg H. Schnell
- Cinematography: Franz Koch
- Production company: Münchner Lichtspielkunst
- Distributed by: Bavaria Film
- Release date: 9 January 1924
- Country: Germany
- Languages: Silent; German intertitles

The Tragedy of a Night of Passion (German: Die Tragödie einer Liebesnacht) is a 1924 German silent drama film directed by Franz Osten and starring Dary Holm, John Mylong and Georg H. Schnell.

It was shot at the Emelka Studios in Munich. The film's sets were designed by the art director Willy Reiber.

== Cast ==
- Dary Holm
- Hanna Lierke
- John Mylong
- Georg H. Schnell
- Karl Falkenberg

== Bibliography ==
- Bock, Hans-Michael; Bergfelder, Tim, eds. (2009). The Concise Cinegraph: Encyclopaedia of German Cinema. New York, NY: Berghahn Books. p. 316. ISBN 1571816550. JSTOR j.ctt1x76dm6.
