= Storm Tide (film) =

1927 film

- Directed by: Willy Reiber
- Written by: Hermanna Barkhausen
- Starring: Dorothea Wieck; Helen von Münchofen; Oscar Marion
- Cinematography: Franz Koch
- Music by: Hans May
- Production company: Münchner Lichtspielkunst
- Distributed by: Süd-Film
- Release date: 29 September 1927
- Country: Germany
- Languages: Silent; German intertitles

Storm Tide (German: Sturmflut) is a 1927 German silent film directed by Willy Reiber and starring Dorothea Wieck, Helen von Münchofen and Oscar Marion.

It was made at the Emelka Studios in Munich. The film's sets were designed by Ludwig Reiber.

== Cast ==
- Dorothea Wieck as Karen Larsen
- Helen von Münchofen as Wera
- Oscar Marion as Nils Sörren
- Harry Hardt as Andrej Michaelowitsch
- Philipp Manning as Dr. Swen Larsen, Karen's father
- Karl Platen as Perkun

== Bibliography ==
- Alfred Krautz. International directory of cinematographers, set- and costume designers in film, Volume 4. Saur, 1984.
