= The Champion Shot =

1932 German film directed by Franz Seitz

- Directed by: Franz Seitz
- Written by: Joseph Dalman; Joe Stöckel
- Produced by: Franz Seitz
- Starring: Weiß Ferdl; Max Adalbert; Hugo Schrader
- Cinematography: Franz Koch
- Edited by: Paul May
- Music by: Toni Thoms
- Production company: Tonfilm-Produktion Franz Seitz
- Distributed by: Bavaria Film
- Release date: 24 September 1932
- Running time: 86 minutes
- Country: Germany
- Language: German

The Champion Shot (German: Der Schützenkönig) is a 1932 German comedy film directed by Franz Seitz and starring Weiß Ferdl, Max Adalbert and Hugo Schrader.

The film's sets were designed by the art director Ludwig Reiber. It was shot at the Bavaria Studios in Munich.

== Synopsis ==
The owner of a store in a small Bavarian town is angered when a new shop is opened by an arrival from Berlin who also claims to be a better marksmen than the local. The two men entertain a rivalry in both business and shooting prowess. To complicate matters further, their children fall in love.

== Cast ==
- Weiß Ferdl as Siebzehnrübel
- Max Adalbert as Funke Sr.
- Hugo Schrader as Funke Jr.
- Gretl Theimer as Anni Siebzehnrübel
- Berthe Ostyn as Lola
- Paula Menari as Sophie Siebzehnrübel
- Joe Stöckel as Schützenvorstand

== Bibliography ==
- Waldman, Harry. Nazi Films in America, 1933–1942. McFarland, 2008.
