= The Villa in Tiergarten Park =

1927 film

- Original film intertitle
- Directed by: Franz Osten
- Written by: Artur Landsberger (novel); John Mylong; Viktor Klein
- Produced by: Joe Stöckel
- Starring: Joe Stöckel; Aud Egede-Nissen; Elsa Krueger
- Cinematography: Karl Attenberger
- Music by: Felix Bartsch
- Production company: Stöckel-Film
- Distributed by: Hirschel-Sofar-Film
- Release date: 23 January 1927
- Country: Germany
- Languages: Silent; German intertitles

The Villa in Tiergarten Park (German: Die Villa im Tiergarten) is a 1927 German silent romance film directed by Franz Osten and starring Joe Stöckel, Aud Egede-Nissen, and Elsa Krueger. It still survives unlike many films from the silent era.

The film's sets were designed by Max Heilbronner.

== Synopsis ==
The easygoing lifestyle of a playboy bachelor and his friends who live in a village in Berlin's Tiergarten Park is threatened by the arrival of a new disciplinarian housekeeper.

== Cast ==
- Joe Stöckel as Willy Blech
- Aud Egede-Nissen as Grete Gerson
- Elsa Krueger as Baronin Inge von Holten
- Charles Willy Kayser as Peter Lenz, Besitzer der Villa
- Hans Albers as Baron Etville
- John Mylong as Rolf Sander
- Bobbie Bender as Theodor Timm, Rolfs Freund
- Alfred Travers as Karl Töns, Rolfs Freund
- Ilona Karolewna as Häslein, Rolf Freundin
- Lissy Arna as Po-Gri, Etvilles Freundin
- Margarete Kupfer as Rosa, Haushälterin
- Maria Minzenti as Frieda, die Zofe
- Sig Arno as Salomon
- Hans Trautner as Franz Orschewsky
- Albert Dettmann as 1. Polizeikommissar
- Aruth Wartan as 2. Polizeikommissar

== Bibliography ==
- Grange, William (2008). Cultural Chronicle of the Weimar Republic. Lanham, MD: Scarecrow Press. ISBN 978-0-8108-5967-8.
