= The Favourite of the Queen =

1922 film directed by Franz Seitz

- Directed by: Franz Seitz
- Written by: Georg Hirschfeld (play); Alfred Schirokauer; Franz Seitz
- Starring: Erich Kaiser-Titz; Hanna Ralph; Willy Kaiser-Heyl
- Cinematography: Karl Attenberger; Franz Planer
- Production company: Münchner Lichtspielkunst
- Distributed by: Bavaria Film
- Release date: 19 October 1922
- Running time: 109 minutes
- Country: Germany
- Languages: Silent; German intertitles

The Favourite of the Queen (German: Der Favorite der Königin) is a 1922 German silent historical film directed by Franz Seitz and starring Erich Kaiser-Titz, Hanna Ralph and Willy Kaiser-Heyl. It is based on a Georg Hirschfeld play set in Elizabethan England, focusing on the tumultuous relationship between Queen Elizabeth I and her favorite, the Earl of Essex, amid court intrigue and a deadly epidemic.

The film was shot at the Emelka Studios in Munich. The film's sets were designed by the art director Willy Reiber.

== Cast ==
- Erich Kaiser-Titz as Lord Surrey
- Hanna Ralph as Königin Elisabeth
- Willy Kaiser-Heyl as Pembroke
- Maria Mindzenty as Evelyne
- Oskar Marion as Comte Warwick
- Alf Blütecher as Arthur Leyde
- Otto Kronburger
- Carl Goetz
- Elise Aulinger
- Ferdinand Martini
- Albert Patry

== Bibliography ==
- Hans-Michael Bock and Tim Bergfelder. The Concise Cinegraph: An Encyclopedia of German Cinema. Berghahn Books, 2009.
