= Manfred Koempel-Pilot =

German stage and film actor (1895–1944)

- Born: 7 May 1895; Würzburg, Bavaria, German Empire
- Died: 1944 (aged 48–49)
- Occupation: Actor
- Years active: 1921-1936 (film)

Manfred Koempel-Pilot (1895–1944) was a German stage and film actor. He is also sometimes credited as André Pilot. Before the outbreak of World War I, Franz Kömpel trained as an operetta tenor at the Berlin Academy of Music. After serving on the front, he began his career in stage and film under the name Manfred Kömpel. In Vienna in particular, he became a favorite with theater audiences: on the occasion of a guest performance on stage, the Badener Zeitung called him the "most beautiful man in Vienna".

== Selected filmography ==
- The Girl from the Rhine (1922)
- The Shot in the Pavilion (1925)
- Mrs Worrington's Perfume (1925)
- A Song from Days of Youth (1925)
- The Seventh Son (1926)
- The Secret of One Hour (1926)
- A Modern Casanova (1928)
- It's You I Have Loved (1929)
- There Were Two Bachelors (1936)

== Bibliography ==
- Ulrich J. Klaus. Deutsche Tonfilme: Filmlexikon der abendfüllenden deutschen und deutschsprachigen Tonfilme nach ihren deutschen Uraufführungen. Klaus-Archiv, 2006.
