= Little Inge and Her Three Fathers =

1926 film

- German: Die kleine Inge und ihre drei Väter
- Directed by: Franz Osten
- Written by: Hermanna Barkhausen
- Starring: Dorothea Wieck; Oscar Marion; Harry Hardt
- Cinematography: Franz Koch; Josef Wirsching
- Production company: Münchner Lichtspielkunst
- Distributed by: Bavaria Film
- Release date: 14 October 1926
- Country: Germany
- Languages: Silent; German intertitles

Little Inge and Her Three Fathers (German: Die kleine Inge und ihre drei Väter) is a 1926 German silent comedy film directed by Franz Osten and starring Dorothea Wieck, Oscar Marion and Harry Hardt. It was made at the Emelka Studios in Munich.

The film's sets were designed by Ludwig Reiber and Willy Reiber

== Cast ==
- Dorothea Wieck as Inge
- Oscar Marion as Jonny Paulsen
- Harry Hardt as Bob Rinks
- Carl Walther Meyer as Fred Krafft
- Antoniette Hagen as Nora
- Mary Brandt as Tante Nelli
- Hermann Pfanz as Father
