= The Director General =

1925 film directed by Fritz Wendhausen

- Directed by: Fritz Wendhausen
- Written by: Ernst Klein (novel); Heinz Goldberg; Adolf Lantz
- Produced by: Paul Ebner; Maxim Galitzenstein
- Starring: Albert Bassermann; Hanna Ralph; Alexandra Sorina
- Cinematography: Willy Gaebel; Sophus Wangøe
- Production company: Maxim-Film
- Distributed by: UFA
- Release date: 24 August 1925
- Running time: 90 minutes
- Country: Germany
- Languages: Silent; German intertitles

The Director General (German: Der Herr Generaldirektor) is a 1925 German silent drama film directed by Fritz Wendhausen and starring Albert Bassermann, Hanna Ralph and Alexandra Sorina. The film's sets were designed by the art director Robert Neppach.

== Cast ==
- Albert Bassermann as Generaldirektor Herbert Heidenberg
- Hanna Ralph as Gerda
- Alexandra Sorina as Hanna Weyl
- Alfred Abel as Konstantin Avalescu
- Hermann Vallentin as Karl Mollheim
- Kurt Vespermann as Reinhold Gehrke
- Bruno Ziener
- Wilhelm Diegelmann

== Bibliography ==
- Bock, Hans-Michael & Bergfelder, Tim. The Concise CineGraph. Encyclopedia of German Cinema. Berghahn Books, 2009. ISBN 978-0-85745-565-9.
