= Written in the Stars (film) =

1925 film

- Directed by: Willy Reiber
- Written by: Elsbeth Ebertin (novel)
- Starring: Maria Mindzenty; Olga Juschakowa; John Mylong
- Cinematography: Franz Koch
- Production company: Münchner Lichtspielkunst
- Distributed by: Bavaria Film
- Release date: 20 May 1925
- Country: Germany
- Languages: Silent; German intertitles

Written in the Stars (German: In den Sternen steht es geschrieben) is a 1925 German silent film directed by Willy Reiber and starring Maria Mindzenty, Olga Juschakowa and John Mylong.

The film's sets were designed by the art director Max Heilbronner. It was shot at the Emelka Studios in Munich.

== Cast ==
- Maria Mindzenty as Lisbeth Gabler
- Olga Juschakowa as Adele von Behren
- John Mylong as Horst Raabe
- Ferdinand Martini as Kallenberger
- Georg H. Schnell as Heinz von Behren
- Toni Wittels
- Hermann Pfanz
- Else Kündinger

== Bibliography ==
- Grange, William. Cultural Chronicle of the Weimar Republic. Scarecrow Press, 2008.
