= The Pearls of Doctor Talmadge =

1925 film

- Directed by: Max Obal
- Produced by: Ernst Reicher
- Starring: Ernst Reicher; Alexandra Sorina
- Production company: Münchner Lichtspielkunst
- Distributed by: Bavaria Film
- Release date: January 1925
- Running time: 87 minutes
- Country: Germany
- Languages: Silent; German intertitles

The Pearls of Doctor Talmadge (German: Die Perlen des Dr. Talmadge) is a 1925 German silent mystery film directed by Max Obal and starring Ernst Reicher and Alexandra Sorina. It was one of a series of films featuring the detective Stuart Webbs. It was made at the Emelka Studios in Munich.

== Cast ==
- Ernst Reicher as Stuart Webbs, Detektiv
- Alexandra Sorina
- Hermann Pfanz
- Fritz Greiner
- Claire Kronburger
- John Mylong

== Bibliography ==
- Rainey, Buck. Serials and Series: A World Filmography, 1912-1956. McFarland, 2015.
