= Alexandra Sorina =

Actress and filmmaker (1899–1973)

- Аляксандра Зорына; Александра Зорина
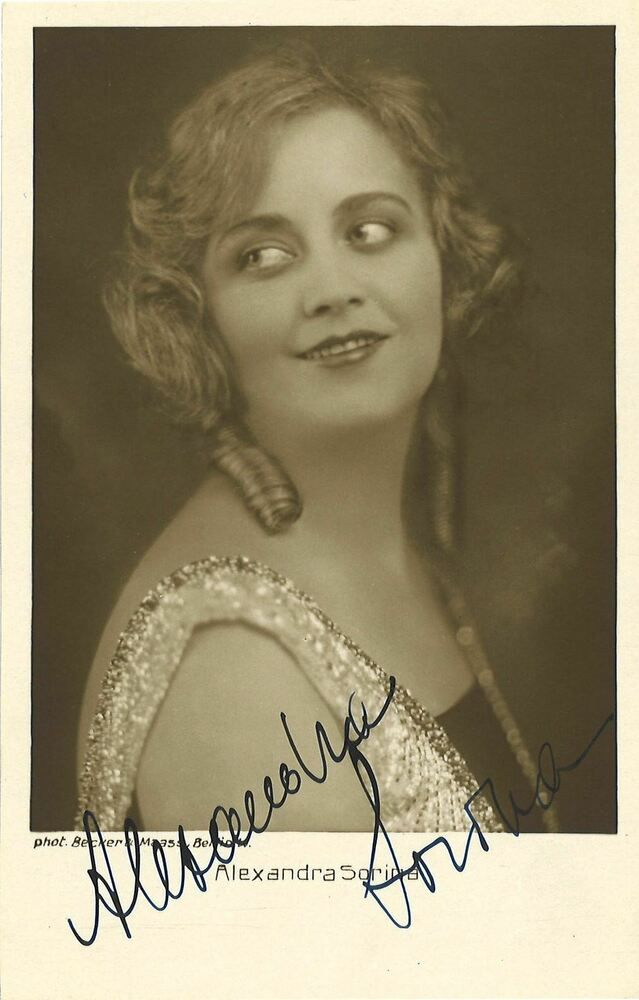
- Born: Aleksandra Tsvikevich; 17 September 1899; Baranavichy, Minsk Governorate, Russian Empire
- Died: 31 May 1973 (aged 73); San Rafael, California, U.S.
- Occupation: Actress
- Years active: 1920–1932
- Spouse: Sergey Avdeyevich Otsup
- Children: Tatiana

Alexandra Sorina (Belarusian: Аляксандра Зорына; Russian: Александра Зорина; born Aleksandra Tsvikevich; 17 September 1899 – 31 May 1973) was a Russian-born actress who had a career in Weimar Germany, mainly in film.

== Selected filmography ==
- Peter the Great (1922)
- The Money Devil (1923)
- The Malay Junk (1924)
- The Hands of Orlac (1924)
- The Pearls of Doctor Talmadge (1925)
- Old Mamsell's Secret (1925)
- The Director General (1925)
- The Woman Who Did (1925)
- The Circus Princess (1925)
- The Most Beautiful Woman in Paris (1928)
- Rasputin, Demon with Women (1932)

== Bibliography ==
- Ragowski, Christian. The Many Faces of Weimar Cinema: Rediscovering Germany's Filmic Legacy. Camden House, 2010.
