= Mrs Worrington's Perfume =

1925 film directed by Franz Seitz

- Directed by: Franz Seitz
- Written by: Hendrik Kerdon
- Produced by: Ernst Reicher
- Starring: Ernst Reicher; Mary Nolan; Maria Mindzenty
- Cinematography: Toni Frenguelli
- Production company: Münchner Lichtspielkunst
- Distributed by: Bavaria Film
- Release date: 10 July 1925
- Running time: 75 minutes
- Country: Germany
- Languages: Silent; German intertitles

Mrs Worrington's Perfume (German: Das Parfüm der Mrs. Worrington) is a 1925 German silent mystery film directed by Franz Seitz and starring Ernst Reicher, Mary Nolan and Maria Mindzenty. It was part of a series of films featuring the detective Stuart Webbs. It was made at the Emelka Studios near Munich.

The film's art direction was by Ludwig Reiber and Otto Völckers

== Cast ==
- Ernst Reicher as Stuart Webbs, Detektiv
- Mary Nolan
- Maria Mindzenty as Mabel Christians
- John Mylong as Dr. Harry Edwards
- Otto Wernicke as Philipp Worrington
- Karl Falkenberg as Charles Taylor
- Ferdinand Martini as Bob Trumm
- Claire Kronburger
- Manfred Koempel-Pilot as Hubert Mills

== Bibliography ==
- Grange, William. Cultural Chronicle of the Weimar Republic. Scarecrow Press, 2008.
