= Valencia (1927 film) =

1927 film

- Directed by: Jaap Speyer
- Written by: Max Ferner
- Starring: María Dalbaicín; Dorothea Wieck; Oskar Marion
- Cinematography: Franz Koch
- Music by: Werner R. Heymann; José Padilla
- Production company: Münchner Lichtspielkunst
- Distributed by: Bavaria Film
- Release date: 30 May 1927
- Country: Germany
- Languages: Silent; German intertitles

Valencia (German: Du schönste aller Rosen) is a 1927 German silent film directed by Jaap Speyer and starring María Dalbaicín, Dorothea Wieck, and Oskar Marion. It was made at the Emelka Studios in Munich.

== Cast ==
- María Dalbaicín as Valencia, Blumenverkäuferin
- Dorothea Wieck as Nicolessa
- Oskar Marion as Hans Joachim Nissen
- Johannes Riemann as Carlos Galiano, Klavierspieler
- Jean Murat as Conte Alfonso de Padilla
- Carl Walther Meyer as Rudolf Wallner, Matrose
- Hermann Pfanz as Anselmo Zamora
- Lina Meittinger as Rosina, seine Frau
- Maria Forescu as Valencias Wirtin

== Bibliography ==
- Bock, Hans-Michael; Bergfelder, Tim, eds. (2009). The Concise Cinegraph: Encyclopaedia of German Cinema. New York: Berghahn Books. ISBN 978-1-57181-655-9.
