= Max Heilbronner =

German art director

- Born: 14 February 1902; Munich, German Empire
- Died: 23 July 1964 (aged 62); Los Angeles, California, United States
- Other name: Max Heilbronner
- Occupation: Art Director
- Years active: 1923-1936 (film)

Max Heilbronner (1902–1964) was a German art director.

== Selected filmography ==
- The Path to God (1924)
- Written in the Stars (1925)
- Hunted People (1926)
- How Do I Marry the Boss? (1927)
- Break-in (1927)
- Poor Little Colombine (1927)
- Klettermaxe (1927)
- The Villa in Tiergarten Park (1927)
- Volga Volga (1928)
- The Duty to Remain Silent (1928)
- Dear Homeland (1929)
- Revolt in the Batchelor's House (1929)
- Pension Schöller (1930)
- Dangers of the Engagement Period (1930)
- Rooms to Let (1930)
- A Thousand Words of German (1930)
- Helene Willfüer, Student of Chemistry (1930)
- Cadets (1931)
- The Emperor's Sweetheart (1931)
- The Testament of Cornelius Gulden (1932)
- An Auto and No Money (1932)
- Overnight Sensation (1932)
- Greetings and Kisses, Veronika (1933)
- The Typist Gets Married (1934)
- A Man Has Been Stolen (1934)
- Fanfare of Love (1935)
- Wedding Night (1935)

== Bibliography ==
- Lotte H. Eisner. The Haunted Screen: Expressionism in the German Cinema and the Influence of Max Reinhardt. University of California Press, 2008.
