= Hanna Ralph =

German actress (1888–1978)

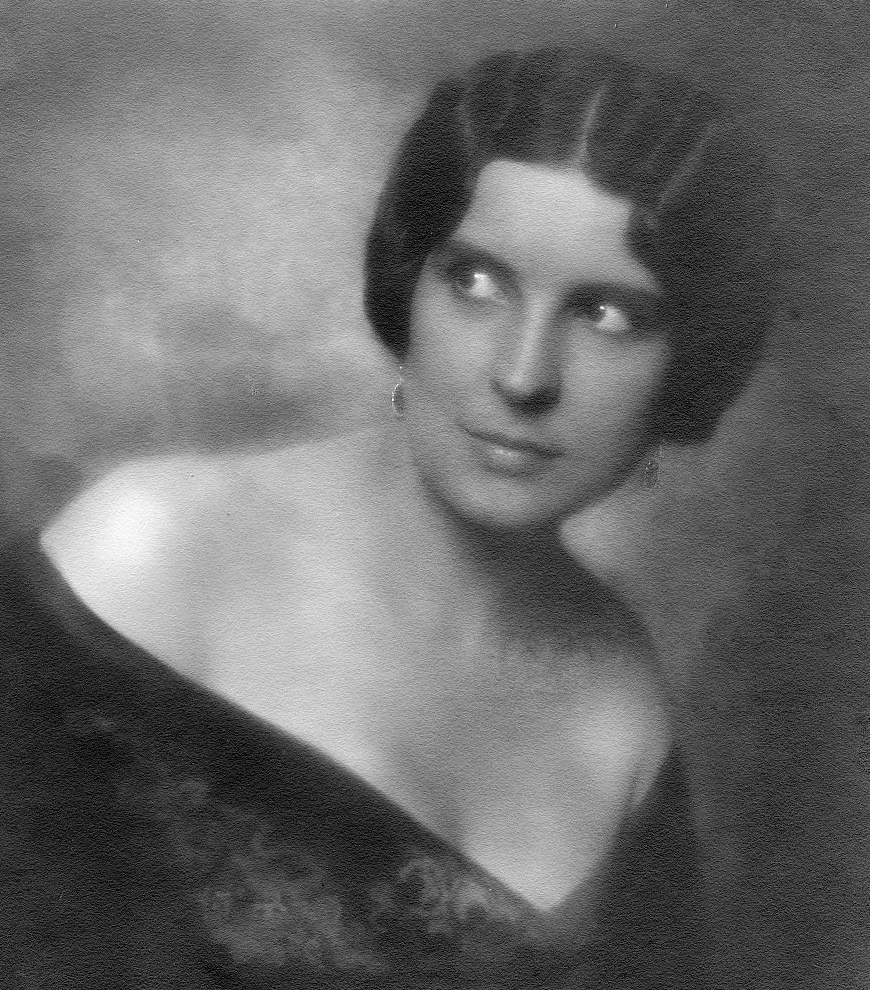
- Hanna Ralph c. 1918
- Born: Johanna Antonia Adelheid Günther; 25 September 1888; Bad Kissingen, German Empire
- Died: 25 March 1978 (aged 89); West Berlin, West Germany
- Occupation: Actress
- Years active: 1913–1952
- Spouse(s): Emil Jannings (m. 1919; div. 1921) Fritz Wendhausen (m. 19??; div. 19??)

Hanna Ralph (born Johanna Antonia Adelheid Günther; 25 September 1888 – 25 March 1978) was a German stage and film actress whose career began on the stage and in silent film in the 1910s and continued through the early 1950s.

== Career ==
Hanna Ralph was born in Bad Kissingen, Germany, she made her stage debut in 1913 at the Schauspielhaus in Frankfurt. From 1914 to 1915 she was engaged at the Staatstheater Mainz and in 1916 at the City Theater in Hamburg. In 1917 she began working on various stages in Berlin.

Hanna Ralph made her screen debut in the 1917 Ludwig Beck-directed short Die entschleierte Maja, opposite actor Walter Janssen and the following year had a starring role in director Georg Jacoby's Keimendes Leben, Teil 1, opposite Emil Jannings. The film serial was followed by Keimendes Leben, Teil 2 in 1919. One of her most popular roles during her early years in films was that of the role of Katarina in Carl Froelich's 1921 film adaptation of Fyodor Dostoevsky's novel Die Brüder Karamasoff (The Brothers Karamazov), with actors Fritz Kortner and Bernhard Goetzke. In 1924 she appeared in the Herbert Wilcox-directed romantic drama Decameron Nights opposite American stage and screen actor Lionel Barrymore, and in Fritz Lang's silent fantasy film Die Nibelungen, based on the epic poem Nibelungenlied, as Brunhild. In 1926 she appeared in the internationally successful F.W. Murnau-directed, Universum Film AG (UFA) distributed Faust – Eine deutsche Volkssage opposite Gösta Ekman, Camilla Horn and ex-husband Emil Jannings.

Hanna Ralph's career withstood the transition to sound film, however she appeared in only three films of the 1930s; instead, she spent much of the decade in theatre. By the Second World War she retired from acting. After the war's end, she briefly returned to film in the early 1950s; appearing in small roles in director Wolfgang Liebeneiner's 1951 crime drama The Blue Star of the South and Harald Reinl's 1952 drama Behind Monastery Walls before retiring from acting altogether.

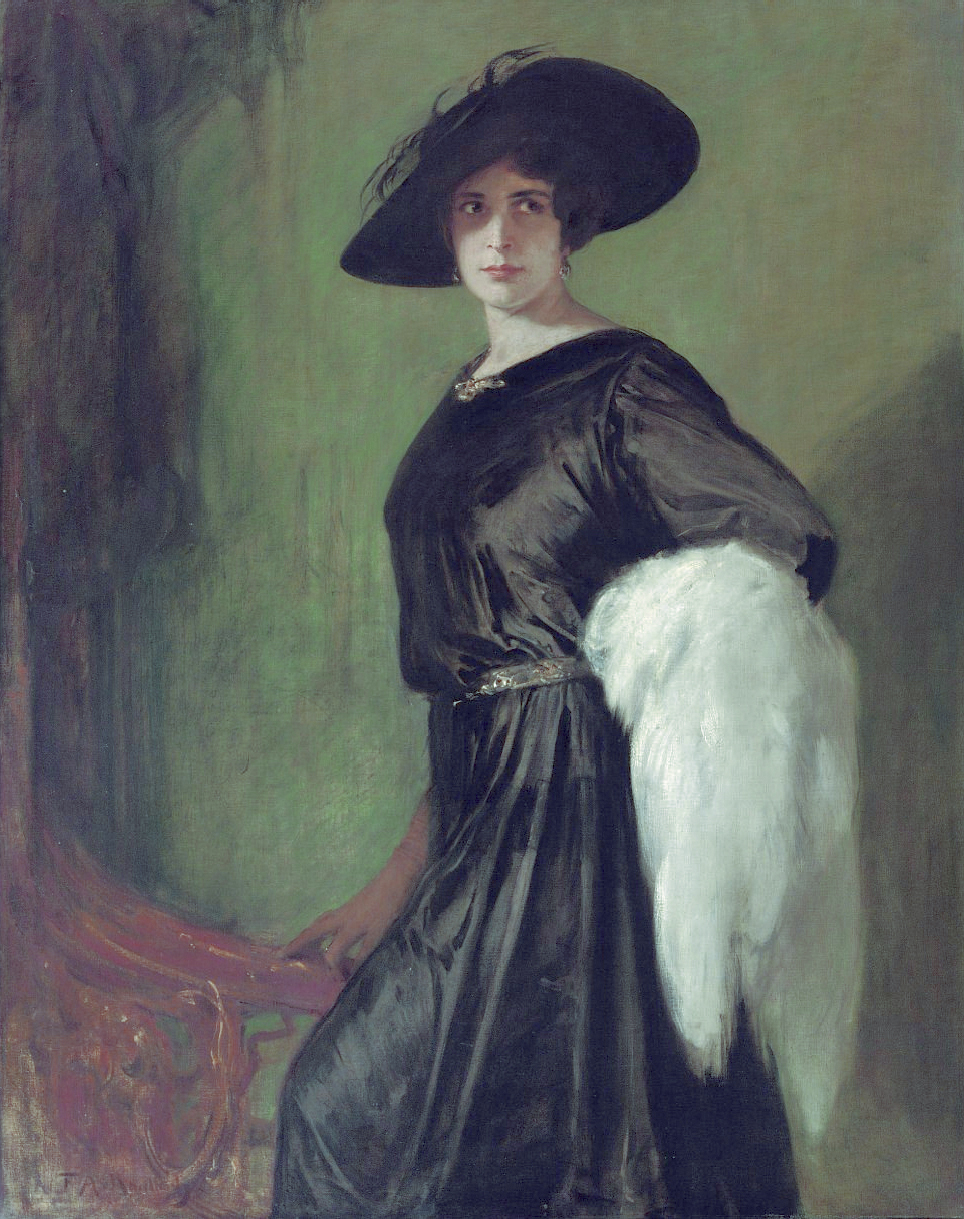
Portrait of Hanna Ralph by Friedrich August Kaulbach, ca. 1912.

== Personal life ==
Hanna Ralph was married to the German actor Emil Jannings in 1919, however the marriage ended in divorce in 1921. She was later briefly married to director Fritz Wendhausen. She died in 1978 in West Berlin, West Germany at the age of 89.

== Awards ==
In 1968 she was awarded the Bundesfilmpreis for her legacy as an actress in German cinema.

== Partial filmography ==
- Die entschleierte Maja (1917) - Naela
- Ferdinand Lassalle (1918) - Gräfin Hatzfeld
- The Seeds of Life (1918-1919, part 1, 2) - Marietta Fraenkel, Fabrikbesitzer
- Tausend und eine Frau. Aus dem Tagebuch eines Junggesellen (1918)
- Das Geheimnis der Cecilienhütte (1918)
- Opium (1919) - Maria Geselius
- The Man of Action (1919) - Henrica van Looy
- Moral und Sinnlichkeit (1919) - Marietta Gerstner
- Prince Cuckoo (1919)
- Das große Licht (1920)
- Algol (1920) - Maria Obal
- The Brothers Karamazov (1920) - Katarina
- The Skull of Pharaoh's Daughter (1920)
- The Bull of Olivera (1921) - Donna Juana
- The Sins of the Mother (1921) - Harriet Kellogg - Schauspielerin
- Ein Fest auf Haderslevhuus (1921) - Wulfhild
- Oberst Rokschanin (1922)
- William Ratcliff (1922)
- Homo sum (1922)
- The Favourite of the Queen (1922) - Königin Elisabeth
- Helena (1924) - Andromache
- Die Nibelungen (1924) - Brunhild
- Decameron Nights (1924) - Lady Violante
- Muß die Frau Mutter werden? (1924) - Frau Derstner
- The Tower of Silence (1925) - Liane
- The Director General (1925) - Gerda
- Faust (1926) - Herzogin von Parma / Duchess of Parma
- Det sovende Hus (1926) - Elisabeth
- Das edle Blut (1927) - Thea von Lingen
- Restless Hearts (1928) - Dolores Heredia
- Napoleon at Saint Helena (1929) - Madame Bertrand
- The King of Paris (1930) - Duchess of Marsignac
- Der sündige Hof (1933) - Lona, seine Frau
- Martha (1936) - Königin von England
- The Blue Star of the South (1951) - Oberin Madeleine
- Behind Monastery Walls (1952) - Generaloberin (final film role)
