= John Mylong =

Austrian actor (1892–1975)

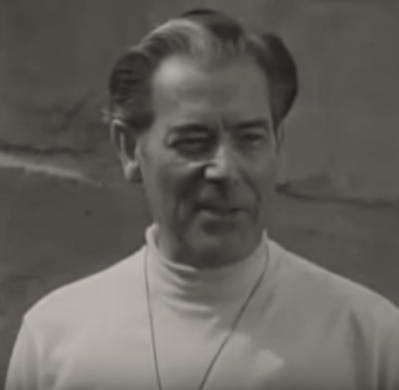
- Mylong in Robot Monster (1953)
- Born: Adolf Heinrich Münz; September 27, 1892; Mosty-Wielkie, Kingdom of Galicia and Lodomeria, Austria-Hungary (now Velyki Mosty, Lviv Oblast, Ukraine)
- Died: September 8, 1975 (aged 82); Beverly Hills, California, U.S.
- Other name: Jack Mylong-Münz
- Education: Max Reinhardt Seminar
- Occupation: Actor
- Years active: 1926–1962

Jack Mylong-Münz (born Adolf Heinrich Münz; September 27, 1892 – September 8, 1975) was an Austrian actor, who later emigrated to the United States. He starred in various Austrian and German silent films, before emigrating as a refugee from Nazi Germany, becoming a Hollywood character actor under the name John Mylong.

== Life and career ==
Mylong was born Adolf Heinrich Münz, to Jewish parents in Velyki Mosty, in present-day Lviv Oblast, Ukraine, then governed as part of the Austro-Hungarian Empire. He studied acting at Max Reinhardt's seminar in Vienna.

He began his stage and film acting career in 1921. He appeared in many Austrian and German silent films under the name Jack Mylong-Münz, and also wrote screenplays. It is unknown where the surname "Mylong" came from. For a time, he was a leading man in period dramas.

In 1934, following the annexation of Austria by Nazi Germany, the Jewish Mylong emigrated to the United States. There, he resumed his acting career, now as "John Mylong" appearing in some 171 film and television roles between then and 1967, mainly in supporting and minor roles. He returned to Germany briefly in 1951, to appear in the Curt Goetz comedy The House in Montevideo.

== Death ==
Mylong died in Beverly Hills, California in 1975, at the age of 82. His remains were cremated.

== Selected filmography ==
- Der heilige Hass, 1. Teil (1921) - Rabob
- Der heilige Hass, 2. Teil - Die Flucht vor dem Tode (1921) - Rabob
- Die Schlucht des Grauens (1921)
- Die Satansfratze (1921)
- Die Nacht der tausend Seelen (1921)
- Das Wirtshaus im Spessart (1923)
- Die Bestie (1923)
- The Tragedy of a Night of Passion (1924)
- The Malay Junk (1924)
- The Terror of the Sea (1924)
- The Four Last Seconds of Quidam Uhl (1924) - Heinrich, Magdalensa Bruder
- Die Tragödie der Entehrten (1924)
- The Pearls of Doctor Talmadge (1925)
- A Song from Days of Youth (1925) - Jürg Asmussen
- Written in the Stars (1925) - Horst Raabe
- Mrs Worrington's Perfume (1925) - Dr. Harry Edwards
- The Adventurous Wedding (1925) - Fergus
- Venetian Lovers (1925) - Chevalier Tomasso
- Der Frauenmarder (1925)
- Your Desire Is Sin (1925) - Felix Dubois
- The Eleven Schill Officers (1926) - Freischärler
- Vienna, How it Cries and Laughs (1926) - Martin - sein Sohn
- I Liked Kissing Women (1926) - Harald Brandt, Gutseleve
- Our Emden (1926)
- The Villa in Tiergarten Park (1927) - Rolf Sander
- The Catwalk (1927) - Felix, sein Sohn
- A Day of Roses in August (1927) - Werner Anrae, ein Maler
- The Convicted (1927)
- The Harbour Bride (1927)
- Grand Hotel (1927)
- Light Cavalry (1927) - Graf Komaroff
- The Eleven Devils (1927) - Biller, gegnerischer Mittelstürmer
- Wenn Menschen reif zur Liebe werden (1927) - Erster Arbeiter
- The False Prince (1927) - Fritz Stein - sein Freund
- Only a Viennese Woman Kisses Like That (1928) - Der 'schwarze Maxl'
- The Old Fritz (1928) - Minister Hagen
- Artists (1928) - his Assistant Kelly
- Who Invented Divorce? (1928)
- The Lady in Black (1928) - Werner Bennigsen
- Cry for Help (1928)
- Strauss Is Playing Today (1928) - Mödlinger
- Adam and Eve (1928) - Chauffeur
- Modern Pirates (1928) - Henry Lincoln, Filmschauspieler
- Mikosch Comes In (1928) - Wachtmeister Rott
- The Harbour Baron (1928) - Der 'Hafenbaron'
- The Secret Adversary (1929) - Boris
- Children of the Street (1929)
- The White Roses of Ravensberg (1929) - Andreas, der Gärtner
- The Merry Widower (1929) - Ein Paradegast
- Das verschwundene Testamant (1929) - von Malten
- The Favourite of Schonbrunn (1929) - Ordonnanz des Kaisers
- Jenny's Stroll Through Men (1929) - Mr. Dinessen
- Two Brothers (1929) - Michael, der Bruder
- Napoleon at Saint Helena (1929)
- Drei Tage auf Leben und Tod - aus dem Logbuch der U.C.1 (1929) - Der Koch
- Pancéřové auto (1930) - Bob Witt
- Das Erlebnis einer Nacht (1930)
- Tonka of the Gallows (1930) - Jan
- The Copper (1930) - Zahnstocher-Jeff (German Version)
- Bockbierfest (1930) - Raumert - Brauereibesitzer
- K. und K. Feldmarschall (1930) - Graf Geza von Medak
- Utrpení sedé sestry (1930) - Adolf
- Different Morals (1931) - Marx, Aushilfsdiener
- Mary (1931) - John Stuart
- Fra Diavolo (1931)
- When the Soldiers (1931) - Ein Rittmeister
- The Squeaker (1931) - Harry "Juwelen Harry" Webber
- Peace of Mind (1931) - Arthur Dreyer, Student
- The Other Side (1931)
- The Paw (1931) - Rennfahrer Lopez
- The Duke of Reichstadt (1931) - Tiburce de Lorget
- Louise, Queen of Prussia (1931)
- Cadets (1931) - Hauptmann Müller
- Holzapfel Knows Everything (1932) - Fritz
- Cruiser Emden (1932) - Offizier der "Emden"
- Die elf Schill'schen Offiziere (1932)
- Kampf um Blond (1933) - Lipkowicz
- The Invisible Front (1933) - Rolf Lange
- The Hymn of Leuthen (1933) - General Seydlitz
- The House of Dora Green (1933) - Pilarsky
- Invisible Opponent (1933)
- Adventures on the Lido (1933)
- Our Emperor (1933) - Royal consellor
- Um ein bisschen Glück (1933) - Fred - Cousin des Professors
- Sestra Angelika (1933)
- Bretter, die die Welt bedeuten (1935)
- Tagebuch der Geliebten (1935)
- Overture to Glory (1940) - Stanislaw Maniusko
- The Devil Pays Off (1941) - Von Eltzen (uncredited)
- Crossroads (1942) - Baron De Lorrain (uncredited)
- Chetniks! The Fighting Guerrillas (1943) - Commander (uncredited)
- The Moon Is Down (1943) - Staff Officer (uncredited)
- Crash Dive (1943) - Captain of Submarine (uncredited)
- They Came to Blow Up America (1943) - German Officer (uncredited)
- For Whom the Bell Tolls (1943) - Colonel Duval
- Hostages (1943) - Proskosch
- The Strange Death of Adolf Hitler (1943) - General Halder
- Corvette K-225 (1943) - Submarine Commander (uncredited)
- The Hitler Gang (1944) - Doctor General (uncredited)
- The Story of Dr. Wassell (1944) - Joyful 'Janssen' Passenger (uncredited)
- Song of the Open Road (1944) - Jack & John Moran's Uncle (uncredited)
- The Mask of Dimitrios (1944) - Druhar (uncredited)
- The Master Race (1944) - Grunning (uncredited)
- The Conspirators (1944) - Prison Commandante (uncredited)
- Experiment Perilous (1944) - Nick Bedereaux Sr. (uncredited)
- Roughly Speaking (1945) - Polish Waiter (uncredited)
- The Clock (1945) - Aristocratic Restaurant Customer (uncredited)
- I'll Tell the World (1945) - Dr. Johnston (uncredited)
- The Falcon in San Francisco (1945) - Carl Dudley
- Lost City of the Jungle (1946, Serial) - Malborn
- The Searching Wind (1946) - Hotel Manager (uncredited)
- Monsieur Beaucaire (1946) - Minister of State (uncredited)
- Cloak and Dagger (1946) - German Captain (uncredited)
- I've Always Loved You (1946) - Impresario (uncredited)
- The Perils of Pauline (1947) - French Doctor (uncredited)
- Unconquered (1947) - Colonel Henry Bouquet
- The Girl from Jones Beach (1949) - Stravitch (uncredited)
- Battleground (1949) - German Major (uncredited)
- Oh, You Beautiful Doll (1949) - Toastmaster (uncredited)
- Young Daniel Boone (1950) - Colonel von Arnheim
- Annie Get Your Gun (1950) - Kaiser Wilhelm II (uncredited)
- Vendetta (1950) - (uncredited)
- His Kind of Woman (1951) - Martin Krafft
- The House in Montevideo (1951) - Anwalt
- Sea Tiger (1952) - J.M. Hennick
- Robot Monster (1953) - The Professor
- Captain Scarface (1953) - Kroll
- Rhapsody (1954) - Doctor (uncredited)
- Magnificent Obsession (1954) - Dr. Hofer
- Alfred Hitchcock Presents (1955) (Season 1 Episode 5: "Into Thin Air" aka "The Vanishing Lady") - Doctor
- The Crooked Web (1955) - Herr Koenig
- Never Say Goodbye (1956) - Herr Gosting
- The Eddy Duchin Story (1956) - Mr. Duchin
- The Beast of Budapest (1958) - General Foeldessy
- I Mobster (1959) - Papa Sante (uncredited)
- Mermaids of Tiburon (1962) - Ernst Steinhauer
