= Alice Hechy =

German actress and singer

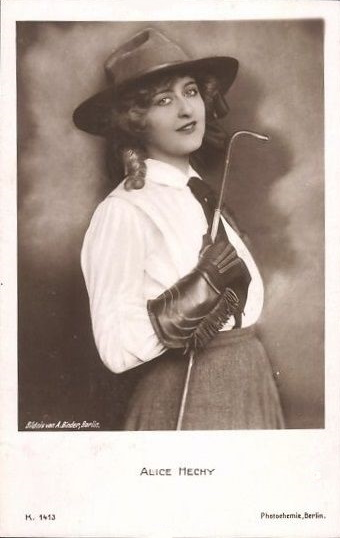
- Born: Alice Scheel; 21 July 1893; Anklam, German Empire
- Died: 26 May 1973 (aged 79); Berlin, West Germany
- Other name: Alice Scheel-Hechy
- Occupations: Actress, singer
- Years active: 1912–1960

Alice Hechy (born Alice Scheel; 21 July 1893 – 26 May 1973) was a German stage and film actress and singer (soprano).

== Selected filmography ==
- Miss Piccolo (1914)
- The Man in the Cellar (1914)
- Kammermusik (1915)
- Tales of Hoffmann (1916)
- The Little Napoleon (1923)
- The Ancient Law (1923)
- Vienna, City of Song (1923)
- Varieté (1925)
- The Adventurous Wedding (1925)
- The Doll of Luna Park (1925)
- The Pink Diamond (1926)
- You Walk So Softly (1928)
- The Cabinet of Doctor Larifari (1930)
- 1914 (1931)
- His Late Excellency (1935)
- Nanon (1938)

== Bibliography ==
- Eisner, Lotte H., The Haunted Screen: Expressionism in the German Cinema and the Influence of Max Reinhardt. University of California Press, 2008.
