= The Adventurous Wedding =

1925 film directed by Franz Seitz

- Directed by: Franz Seitz
- Written by: Josef Berger; Franz Seitz
- Starring: Hans Unterkircher; Maria Mindzenty; Alice Hechy
- Cinematography: Karl Attenberger; Hans Karl Gottschalk
- Production company: Münchner Lichtspielkunst
- Distributed by: Bavaria Film
- Release date: August 1925
- Country: Germany
- Languages: Silent; German intertitles

The Adventurous Wedding (German: Die abenteuerliche Hochzeit) is a 1925 German silent film directed by Franz Seitz and starring Hans Unterkircher, Maria Mindzenty and Alice Hechy.

The film's art direction was by Ludwig Reiber and Otto Völckers. It was shot at the Emelka Studios in Munich.

== Cast ==
- Hans Unterkircher as Sir Henry Lie
- Maria Mindzenty as Mary Wood
- Alice Hechy as Ruth
- Carl Walther Meyer as Frank Carabin
- John Mylong as Fergus
- Josef Berger as Samuel
