= Norbert Weber =

German Benedictine priest (1870–1956)

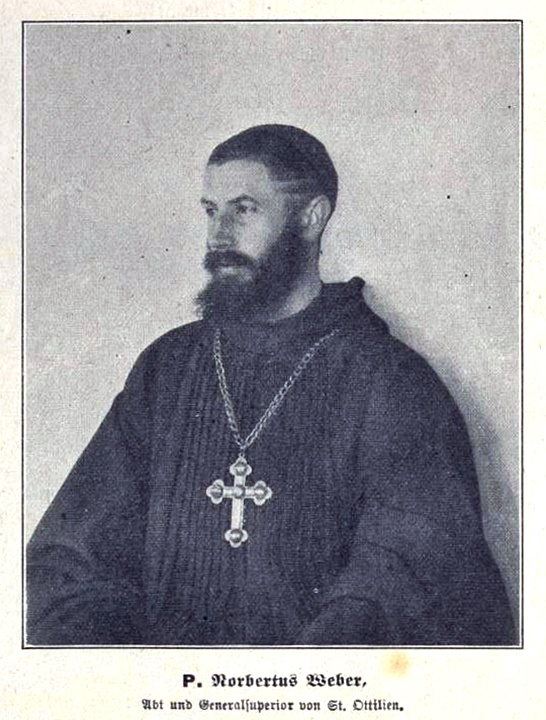
- Weber in 1903
- Born: 20 December 1870; Langweid am Lech, Kingdom of Bavaria
- Died: 3 April 1956 (aged 85)
- Occupation: Benedictine Archabbot
- Known for: Founding monastic orders abroad and early Western documentation of Korea
- Notable work: Im Lande der Morgenstille (film, 1927)

Norbert Weber, O.S.B. (20 December 1870 – 3 April 1956) was a German Catholic priest. He was a monk of the Benedictine Order and an archabbot of St. Ottilien Archabbey. He is remembered in South Korea for his role in starting the first male monastic order in the peninsula, as well as for his extensive photos and videos of Korean culture and civilization.

== Biography ==
Weber was born on 20 December 1870 in Langweid am Lech, Kingdom of Bavaria.

=== Korea ===
In 1909, Weber dispatched two missionaries to Korea in order to establish a monastic community there. Weber himself visited the peninsula twice, once in 1911 and once in 1925, for a total of eight months.

Weber extensively photographed and filmed Korea on his second trip to the peninsula. Prior to his films, video had been taken on the peninsula, but only in short fragments. Weber uniquely filmed enough footage for not only a feature-length film, but also five other short films, with 5,000 metres (16,000 ft) of 35 mm film with unused footage left over. Given the expense and rarity of filming equipment at the time, this was a significant investment on his part.

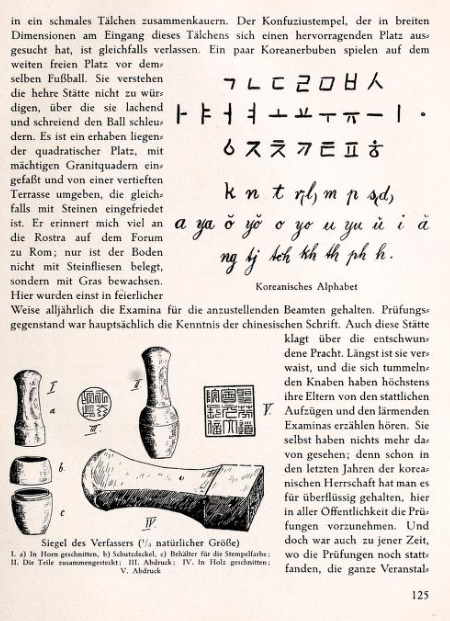
Page 125 of Weber's book, Im Lande der Morgenstille. Shows a diagram explaining Hangul, the Korean alphabet, as well as a dojang: a seal used to prove identity, similarly to a Western signature.

Weber had an interest in anthropology, and was fond of the Korean culture and people. He hoped to document as much as he could, as he was concerned that the Empire of Japan, which had colonized Korea in 1910, was going to wipe out Korean culture. After he returned to Germany, he edited his footage together and recorded additional clips of him lecturing on various aspects of Korean society, technology, and language. He produced two films in 1925: the feature-length Im Lande der Morgenstille (lit. In the Land of the Morning Calm) and a shorter film on Korean weddings. He premiered the former in 1927, at the Bavarian National Museum. The film was shown in various places in Germany and Austria until the end of the 1930s.

In 1979, the South Korean broadcaster MBC acquired copies of his feature-length film on VHS and showed it for the first time on the peninsula. For decades afterwards, more of his films have been discovered, archived, and distributed for viewing. In 2020, the Korean Film Archive gained access to the original films, redigitized them into 4k resolution, and improved the picture quality.

== Works ==
=== Books ===
- Im Lande der Morgenstille (1915)
- In den Diamantenbergen Koreas (1927)

=== Films ===
- Im Lande der Morgenstille (1927)
