= Willy Reiber =

German film director, producer and set designer

- Born: 20 February 1895; Munich, Kingdom of Bavaria, German Empire
- Died: 27 November 1980 (aged 85); Munich, Bavaria, West Germany
- Years active: 1921–1945 (film)

Willy Reiber (20 February 1895 – 27 November 1980) was a German film director, producer and set designer. For many years he worked for the forerunners of Bavaria Film at the Emelka Studios in Munich.

Reiber was the art director for Alfred Hitchcock's The Mountain Eagle. He produced the 1943 Nazi propaganda film Titanic.

== Selected filmography ==
- The Drums of Asia (1921)
- Monna Vanna (1922)
- The Favourite of the Queen (1922)
- Trutzi from Trutzberg (1922)
- The Way to the Light (1923)
- Maciste and the Chinese Chest (1923)
- The Tragedy of a Night of Passion (1924)
- Taras Bulba (1924)
- Love of Life (1924)
- The Lion of Venice (1924)
- A Song from Days of Youth (1925)
- Written in the Stars (1925)
- Little Inge and Her Three Fathers (1926)
- Storm Tide (1927)
- Klettermaxe (1927)
- Spy of Madame Pompadour (1928)
- The Gambling Den of Montmartre (1928)
- The Sun Rises (1934)
- Men, Animals and Sensations (1938)
- The Fire Devil (1940)

== Works cited ==
- Waldman, Harry (2008). Nazi Films In America, 1933-1942. McFarland & Company. ISBN 9780786438617.

== Bibliography ==
- Giesen, Rolf. Nazi Propaganda Films: A History and Filmography. McFarland, 2003.
