= A Song from Days of Youth =

1925 film

- Directed by: Franz Osten
- Written by: Max Ferner
- Starring: Maria Mindzenty; John Mylong; Ferdinand Martini
- Cinematography: Franz Koch
- Production company: Münchner Lichtspielkunst
- Distributed by: Bavaria Film
- Release date: 2 June 1925
- Running time: 78 minutes
- Country: Germany
- Languages: Silent; German intertitles

A Song from Days of Youth (German: Aus der Jugendzeit klingt ein Lied) is a 1925 German silent film directed by Franz Osten and starring Maria Mindzenty, John Mylong and Ferdinand Martini.

The film's sets were designed by the art director Willy Reiber. It was shot at the Emelka Studios in Munich.

== Cast ==
- Maria Mindzenty as Anna Tjomsen
- John Mylong as Jürg Asmussen
- Ferdinand Martini as Schuster Asmussen
- Toni Wittels as seine Frau
- Waldemar Potier as Klein-Jürgen
- Loni Nest as Klein-Anna
- Georg H. Schnell as Graf Tessing
- Claire Harten as Gräfin Tessing
- Manfred Koempel-Pilot as ihr Sohn, Axel
- Patric Gehring as Klein-Axel
- Lilian Gray as Elinor Wilzin
- Ernst Schrumpf as ihr Vater

== Bibliography ==
- John Holmstrom. The moving picture boy: an international encyclopaedia from 1895 to 1995. Michael Russell, 1996.
