= The Shot in the Pavilion =

1925 film directed by Max Obal

- Directed by: Max Obal
- Written by: Max Ferner
- Produced by: Ernst Reicher
- Starring: Ernst Reicher; Margarete Schlegel; Helena Makowska
- Cinematography: Franz Koch
- Production company: Münchner Lichtspielkunst
- Distributed by: Bavaria Film
- Release date: 18 September 1925
- Running time: 83 minutes
- Country: Germany
- Languages: Silent; German intertitles

The Shot in the Pavilion (German: Der Schuß im Pavillon) is a 1925 German silent mystery film directed by Max Obal and starring Ernst Reicher, Margarete Schlegel and Helena Makowska. It features the popular detective character Stuart Webbs who appeared in a number of silent films. It was made at the Emelka Studios in Munich and released by Bavaria Film. The film's sets were designed by the art director Ludwig Reiber.

== Synopsis ==
A very valuable pearl necklace is leant by a museum in order to be warn by a prima ballerina for a performance at the city's opera house. Despite the extensive security precautions she is discovered murdered and the pearls have vanished. The private detective Stuart Webbs is called onto the case. His suspicions turn to the museum director whose financial difficulties may have made him susceptible to talking part in the theft and murder.

== Cast ==
- Ernst Reicher as Stuart Webbs, Detektiv
- Margarete Schlegel
- Helena Makowska
- Josef Berger
- Friedl Haerlin
- Georg Henrich
- Manfred Koempel-Pilot
- Ferdinand Martini
- Siegfried Raabe

== Bibliography ==
- Grange, William. Cultural Chronicle of the Weimar Republic. Scarecrow Press, 2008.
