= My Heidelberg, I Can Not Forget You =

1927 film

- Directed by: James Bauer
- Written by: Max Ferner
- Starring: Dorothea Wieck; Hans Adalbert Schlettow; Vivian Gibson; Karl Platen
- Cinematography: Franz Koch; Josef Wirsching
- Music by: Fred Raymond
- Production company: Bavaria Film
- Distributed by: Bavaria Film
- Release date: 8 July 1927
- Country: Germany
- Languages: Silent; German intertitles

My Heidelberg, I Can Not Forget You (German: Mein Heidelberg, ich kann Dich nicht vergessen) is a 1927 German silent film directed by James Bauer and starring Dorothea Wieck, and Hans Adalbert Schlettow.

It was shot at the Emelka Studios in Munich.

== Cast ==
- Dorothea Wieck as Klärchen Schröder
- Hans Adalbert Schlettow as Fritz Hansen, Reedereibesitzer
- Vivian Gibson as Mia, seine Geliebte
- Karl Platen as Georg Schröder, der Vater
- Harry Halm
- Sylvester Bauriedl as Alex Winckler, cand. jur.
- Emil Höfer as Pastor Schönhoff
- Gertrud de Lalsky as Sophie, seine Frau
- Georg Irmer as Erstchargierter Merkelbach
- Carla Färber as Trude, Klärchen Freundin

== Bibliography ==
- Bock, Hans-Michael & Bergfelder, Tim. The Concise CineGraph. Encyclopedia of German Cinema. Berghahn Books, 2009.
