= Gertrud David =

Journalist and screenwriter

Gertrud David, née Swiderski, (25 December 1872 – 21 June 1936) was a German journalist, film producer, director, and screenwriter.

== Biography ==
Gertrud Swiderski was born on 25 December 1872 in Leipzig to Helene (née Schlenk) and Philipp Swiderski. She was the oldest of four siblings born into a wealthy family. In April 1896, she married the Eduard David, a newspaper editor and Social Democrat, who would become involved in politics and a proponent of Socialist reform.

After her marriage, David studied economics at Women's college (German: Höheren Töchterschule) of Leipzig. As early as 1896, she had begun publishing about women's issues and from 1899 she wrote about the consumer cooperative movement. Between 1900 and 1917 she served as editor of the "Cooperative Society" (German: Genossenschaftswesen) section of the Socialist Monthly Lectures and wrote widely in the Social Democratic press. David and her husband relocated to Berlin in 1905, but separated in 1908, finally divorcing in 1911, though they continued to work closely together. Women's issues of maternity protection and sexual reformation were important topics she addressed.

In the early 1910s, David discovered the new medium of film and recognized its usefulness to publicize social issues. At the end of World War I, she produced a film, Die Geächten, which dealt with the issue of illegitimacy and the stigma it caused for children. This was followed by several films which brought commentary on social and economic conditions after the war. Between 1922 and 1941, David and the company she founded, Gervid Film GmbH Berlin, produced social and industrial films, like those for the medical conglomerate Bethel. The films made for Bethel's hospitals, care facilities and research centers were both a historic record and a type of propaganda to boast of their own achievements brought about by their concept of Christian welfare and caring.

== Death ==
David died in Berlin on 21 June 1936, but her company continued to operate under the direction of her daughter, Sonja, until operations were ceased by the Reich Ministry of Public Enlightenment and Propaganda.
