= The Duke of Reichstadt (1920 film) =

1920 film

- Directed by: Hans Otto
- Starring: Rainer Simons; Käthe Schindler; Maria Mindzenty
- Cinematography: K. Bauernfeindt; Josef Zeitlinger
- Production company: Historia-Film
- Release date: 1920
- Country: Austria
- Languages: Silent; German intertitles

The Duke of Reichstadt (German:Der Herzog von Reichstadt) is a 1920 Austrian silent film directed by Hans Otto and starring Rainer Simons, Käthe Schindler and Maria Mindzenty.

== Cast ==
- Rainer Simons as Napoleon
- Käthe Schindler as Kaiserin Maria Louise
- Maria Mindzenty as Hermine Metternich
- Annemarie Steinsieck as Helene Favour
- Maria Pünkösdy as Marja
- Paula Markl as Gräfin Schönstein
- Hugo Werner-Kahle as Metternich
- Olaf Fjord as Herzog von Reichstadt und Alexander Wronsky
- Frl. Pittner as Fanny Elssler
- Herr. Souzal as Kaiser Franz I.
- Robert Balajthy as Duval
- Franz Weißmüller as Monthalva
- Herr Roth as alter Diener

== Bibliography ==
- Robert von Dassanowsky. Austrian Cinema: A History. McFarland, 2005.
