= Franz Koch (cinematographer) =

German cinematographer

- Born: 1 September 1898; Munich, Bavaria, German Empire
- Died: 28 April 1959 (aged 60); Munich, Bavaria, West Germany
- Occupation: Cinematographer
- Years active: 1920-1959 (film)

Franz Paul Koch (1 September 1898 in Munich - 28 April 1959) was a German cinematographer.

In 1913, Koch was hired in a production of the Munich film pioneer Peter Ostermayr, and over the years he learned his trade as a cameraman. In 1920 he made his first film as chief cameraman for the company Emelka. Koch also worked for other film companies in Munich, where he collaborated frequently with the local directors Franz Osten and Franz Seitz.

He was the cinematographer for many Ludwig Ganghofer adaptions, film comedies and dramas and was also involved in the propaganda films SA-Mann Brand and Leni Riefenstahl's Triumph des Willens. From 1937 to 1941 he was a cameraman for all films with Hans Albers as the main character, which he worked with until the war, also with Hans Schweikart.

== Selected filmography ==
- Der Kopf des Gonzales (1920)
- Der Brand im Varieté Mascotte (1921)
- The Way to the Light (1923)
- Victim of Love (1923)
- The Terror of the Sea (1924)
- The Tragedy of a Night of Passion (1924)
- Love of Life (1924)
- Verborgene Gluten (1925)
- A Song from Days of Youth (1925)
- Written in the Stars (1925)
- The Shot in the Pavilion (1925)
- Little Inge and Her Three Fathers (1926)
- The Hunter of Fall (1926)
- The Seventh Son (1926)
- I Lost My Heart in Heidelberg (1926)
- My Heidelberg, I Can Not Forget You (1927)
- Valencia (1927)
- Storm Tide (1927)
- Restless Hearts (1928)
- The Foreign Legionnaire (1928)
- Love on Skis (1928)
- A Better Master (1928)
- Children's Tragedy (1928)
- The Gambling Den of Montmartre (1928)
- The Women's War (1928)
- Behind Monastery Walls (1928)
- When the White Lilacs Bloom Again (1929)
- Left of the Isar, Right of the Spree (1929)
- The Chaste Coquette (1929)
- Bookkeeper Kremke (1930)
- Boycott (1930)
- Love and Champagne (1930)
- The Big Attraction (1931)
- Wenn dem Esel zu wohl ist (1932)
- The Bartered Bride (1932)
- Sacred Waters (1932)
- The Prince of Arcadia (1932)
- The Champion Shot (1932)
- Cruiser Emden (1932)
- A Woman Like You (1933)
- S.A.-Mann Brand (1933)
- The Master Detective (1933)
- Three Bluejackets and a Blonde (1933)
- Mit dir durch dick und dünn (1934)
- Achtung! Wer kennt diese Frau? (1934)
- At Blonde Kathrein's Place (1934)
- The Tannhof Women (1934)
- Between Heaven and Earth (1934)
- Everything for a Woman (1935)
- Triumph of the Will (1935)
- The King's Prisoner (1935)
- Hangmen, Women and Soldiers (1935)
- Du kannst nicht treu sein (1936)
- The Unsuspecting Angel (1936)
- The Three Around Christine (1936)
- Street Music (1936)
- IA in Oberbayern (1937)
- The Voice of the Heart (1937)
- Gastspiel im Paradies (1938)
- Red Orchids (1938)
- People Who Travel (1938)
- Travelling People (1938)
- Sergeant Berry (1939)
- Water for Canitoga (1939)
- Trenck the Pandur (1940)
- The Eternal Spring (1940)
- Carl Peters (1941)
- What Does Brigitte Want? (1941)
- Comrades (1941)
- Secret File W.B.1 (1942)
- Seven Years of Good Luck (1942)
- Tonelli (1943)
- The Endless Road (1943)
- Orient Express (1944)
- I Need You (1944)
- Long Is the Road (1948)
- The Lost Face (1948)
- Keepers of the Night (1949)
- Night of the Twelve (1949)
- Heimliches Rendezvous (1949)
- The Trip to Marrakesh (1949)
- Chased by the Devil (1950)
- Two in One Suit (1950)
- King for One Night (1950)
- Regimental Music (1950)
- Kissing Is No Sin (1950)
- The Midnight Venus (1951)
- Wild West in Upper Bavaria (1951)
- The Cloister of Martins (1951)
- Ich heiße Niki (1952)
- House of Life (1952)
- The Exchange (1952)
- Behind Monastery Walls (1952)
- The Crucifix Carver of Ammergau (1952)
- Marriage for One Night (1953)
- Marriage Strike (1953)
- The Monastery's Hunter (1953)
- Hubertus Castle (1954)
- Love and Trumpets (1954)
- Das Schweigen im Walde (1955)
- The Royal Waltz (1955)
- The Vulture Wally (1956)
- An American in Salzburg (1958)
- Mein ganzes Herz ist voll Musik (1958)
- Der Schäfer vom Trutzberg (1959)
