= Maria Minzenti =

Austrian actress

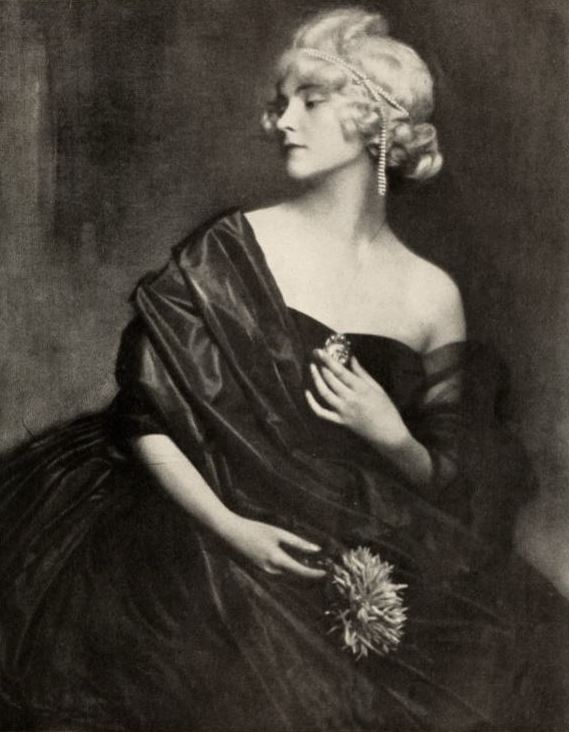
- From a 1922 magazine
- Born: 21 May 1898; Vienna, Austro-Hungarian Empire
- Died: 19 April 1973 (aged 74); Vienna, Austria
- Other name: Maria Mindzenty
- Occupation: Actress
- Years active: 1920–1933 (film)

Maria Minzenti or sometimes Maria Mindzenty (21 May 1898 – 19 April 1973) was an Austrian film actress.

== Selected filmography ==
- The Duke of Reichstadt (1920)
- The Favourite of the Queen (1922)
- Meriota the Dancer (1922)
- The Separating Bridge (1922)
- The Path to God (1924)
- Venetian Lovers (1925)
- Mrs Worrington's Perfume (1925)
- A Song from Days of Youth (1925)
- The Adventurous Wedding (1925)
- Your Desire Is Sin (1925)
- Written in the Stars (1925)
- Our Emden (1926)
- Grandstand for General Staff (1926)
- The Seventh Son (1926)
- The Villa in Tiergarten Park (1927)
- The Page Boy at the Golden Lion (1928)
- What's Wrong with Nanette? (1929)
- When the Evening Bells Ring (1930)
- Judgment of Lake Balaton (1933)

== Bibliography ==
- Goble, Alan (1999). The Complete Index to Literary Sources in Film. Berlin: Walter de Gruyter. ISBN 978-3-11-095194-3.
