= The Mountain Eagle =

1926 film by Alfred Hitchcock

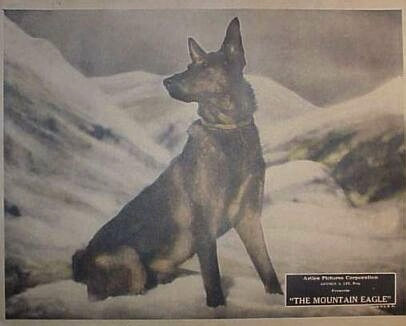
- Original film lobby card
- Directed by: Alfred Hitchcock
- Screenplay by: Eliot Stannard; Max Ferner
- Story by: Charles Lapworth
- Produced by: Michael Balcon
- Starring: Nita Naldi; Bernhard Goetzke; Malcolm Keen; John F. Hamilton
- Cinematography: Gaetano di Ventimiglia
- Production companies: Gainsborough Pictures; Münchner Lichtspielkunst; Bavaria Film
- Distributed by: Woolf & Freedman Film Service (UK)
- Release date: May 1926 (Munich)
- Running time: 100 minutes
- Countries: United Kingdom; Germany
- Languages: Silent film, English intertitles

The Mountain Eagle is a 1926 lost film directed by Alfred Hitchcock following his debut in The Pleasure Garden. The silent film, a romantic drama set in Kentucky, is about a widower (Bernhard Goetzke) who jealously competes with his crippled son (John F. Hamilton) and a man he loathes (Malcolm Keen) over the affections of a schoolteacher (Nita Naldi). The film was mostly produced at the Emelka Film studios in Munich, Germany in autumn of 1925, with exterior scenes shot in the village of Obergurgl in the State of Tyrol, Austria. Production was plagued with problems, including the destruction of a village roof and Hitchcock experiencing altitude sickness. Due to producing the film in Germany, Hitchcock had more directorial freedom than he would have had in England, and he was influenced by German cinematic style and technique.

The film was released in Germany in May 1926 and screened for its British distributors in October 1926. It was met with disapproval and it was not until after the success of Hitchcock's The Lodger: A Story of the London Fog that the film was released in the UK in May 1927. The film received mixed reviews and Hitchcock himself told François Truffaut he was relieved that the film was lost. Six surviving stills of The Mountain Eagle are reproduced in Truffaut's book, and further stills have been found. In 2012, a set of 24 still photographs was found in an archive of one of Hitchcock's close friends. The Cine Tirol Film Commission has described it as "the most wanted film in the world"; the British Film Institute has the film on the top of their BFI 75 Most Wanted list of missing films, and is actively searching for it.

== Plot ==
In Kentucky, where J. P. Pettigrew's wife had died giving birth to their son Edward, born disabled. Pettigrew loathes John 'Fear o' God' Fulton who was also in love with Pettigrew's wife. Pettigrew later witnesses his now-grown son having sex with schoolteacher Beatrice, and confronts her about the relationship. He attempts to take her in his arms, but Beatrice rejects his advances. Edward sees this and flees the village.

Pettigrew is incensed at both Beatrice's rejection and the loss of his son, and thus attempts to have Beatrice arrested as a wanton harlot. John forestalls Pettigrew's plan by marrying Beatrice and taking her to his cabin where they fall in love. Beatrice becomes pregnant. Pettigrew seeks revenge by having John thrown in prison for murdering his (missing) son.

A year later, John breaks out of prison and attempts to flee with Beatrice and their child. However, Beatrice falls ill and John must return to the village for a doctor. There he finds that Edward has reappeared. John's affairs are now cleared up and he is legally free from the charge of murder. Pettigrew is subsequently shot and wounded (contemporary sources differ on this point), and is no longer a threat to John and his family.

== Cast ==
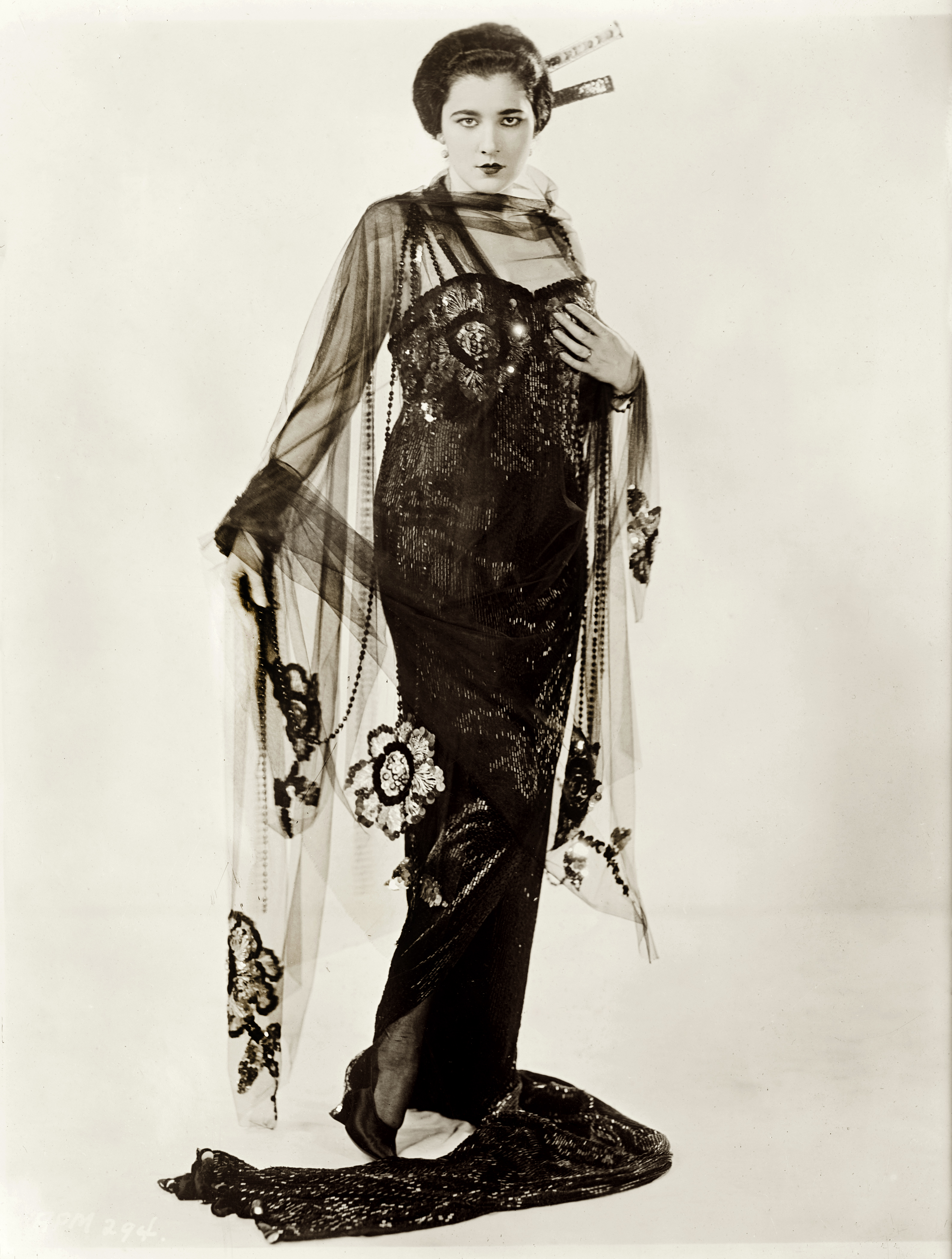
Nita Naldi

- Nita Naldi as Beatrice
- Malcolm Keen as John "Fear O' God" Fulton
- John F. Hamilton as Edward Pettigrew
- Bernhard Goetzke as J.P. Pettigrew
- Ferdinand Martini

== Preservation status ==
The Mountain Eagle is the only completed feature film directed by Hitchcock that is considered a lost film, meaning that no prints are known to exist. Six surviving stills are reproduced in François Truffaut's book. More stills have since been located, many of which are reproduced in Dan Auiler's book. A lobby card for the film was found in a box of broken frames at a flea market in Rowley, Massachusetts. In 2012, a set of 24 still photographs were found in the archive of one of Hitchcock's close friends. Although these images gave clues to the film and its story, they were taken on the set rather than being stills from the film itself. They were auctioned off in Los Angeles for $6,000 (£3,700). Hitchcock's notebooks were also found, documenting his journey to Obergurgl by train, horse and cart, and by foot.

== Production ==
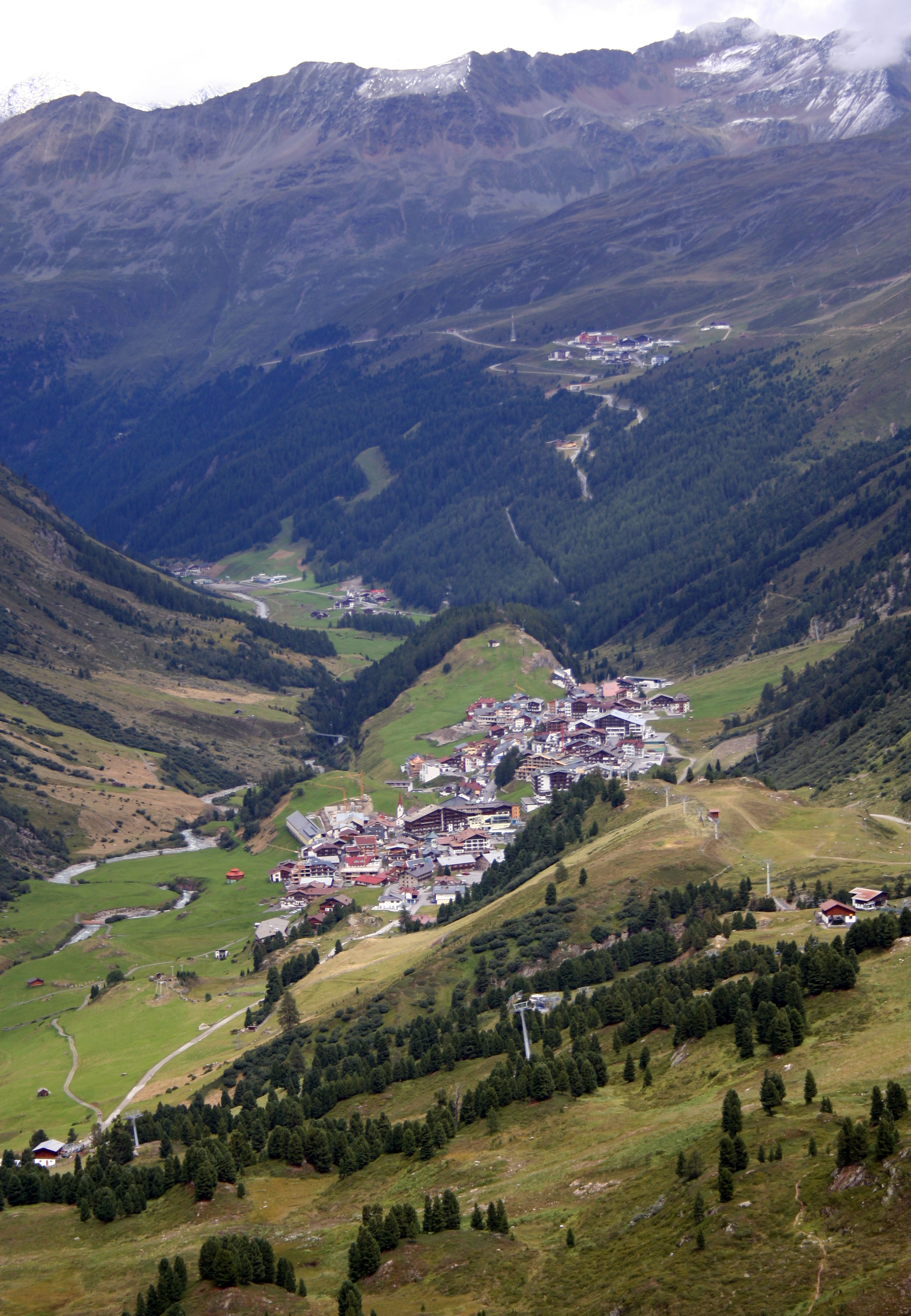
The village of Obergurgl in the State of Tyrol, where the exterior footage of the film was shot

Both The Pleasure Garden and The Mountain Eagle were produced in co-operation with Emelka Film Studios in Munich, Germany. The film was mostly shot at Emelka in Munich in autumn 1925, and the film exteriors were shot on location in Obergurgl, in what is now the municipality of Sölden in the State of Tyrol in southwestern Austria, the Ötztal Alps standing in for the mountains and hollows of Kentucky. Due to producing the film in Germany, Hitchcock had more directorial freedom than he would have had in England, and influences in the technique and style of German cinema are evident in his early works.

Production was plagued with problems. Poor weather during the location shoot was a constant source of trouble, and Hitchcock and the crew had an uneasy relationship with the locals. Hitchcock ordered the clearance of snow from a meadow and ordered the local volunteer fire brigade to blast it away, causing the roof of a nearby building to collapse. The mayor demanded compensation of one shilling, but Hitchcock gave the woman who owned the house two shillings to cover the repair work and the inconvenience. Hitchcock offended the locals by refusing to stay at the village inn, and when he was taken ill with altitude sickness, he blamed the sickness on his reaction to the guttural sound of their accents.

== Reception ==
The film was initially screened for its British distributors in October 1926, but they did not think much of the film and decided to shelve it. However, due to the runaway success of The Lodger: A Story of the London Fog, which was released in February 1927, the producers decided to release The Mountain Eagle three months later on 23 May 1927.

Writing in 1949, the academic Peter Noble inadvertently started a rumour repeated by many authors since, of the film being released in the United States as Fear o' God. Noble's assertion is contradicted by the title on the surviving US lobby card and film historian J. Larry Kuhns, who claims the film was never released under that title.

The film, distributed by Gainsborough Pictures, was neither a critical nor commercial success; Leonard J. Leff states that the film "impressed neither the distributor nor the public". Like Hitchcock's other early films, the film was criticised for a lack of realism; an early review by Bioscope stated that "in spite of skilful and at times brilliant direction, the story has an air of unreality." Hitchcock himself considered The Mountain Eagle to be mundane melodrama best forgotten, and described the film to François Truffaut as "awful" and a "very bad movie", and stated that he was not sorry that there are no known prints. After being bitterly disappointed with his first two films, Hitchcock believed that his directing career would soon be over, although he later described Waltzes from Vienna (1934) to be the "lowest ebb" of his career. Film historian J. Lary Kuhns, however, states in the book Hitchcock's Notebooks by Dan Auiler that one contemporary writer called The Mountain Eagle far superior to The Lodger. The Guardian describes the film as "a ripping yarn about a dastardly father, a crippled son, a lovely schoolteacher and an innocent imprisoned".

William Rothman considers both The Pleasure Garden and The Mountain Eagle to be "equally worthy of study". The Cine Tirol Film Commission has described The Mountain Eagle as "the most wanted film in the world". In 1992, the British Film Institute released its first "Missing Presumed Lost" list of films, and in January 2010 they announced that they had begun actively searching for some 75 missing films, including The Mountain Eagle.

== See also ==
- List of lost films
