= Ferdinand Martini =

German actor (1870–1930)

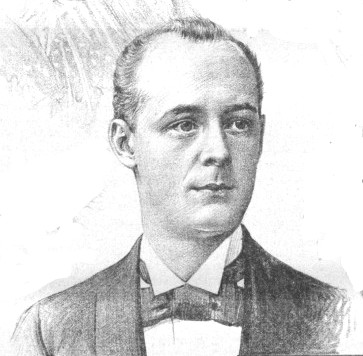
- Ferdinand Martini (1896)
- Born: 1 September 1870; Munich, Kingdom of Bavaria
- Died: 23 December 1930 (aged 60); Germany
- Occupation: Actor
- Years active: 1920–1931

Ferdinand Martini (1 September 1870 – 23 December 1930) was a German film actor. He appeared in 38 films between 1920 and 1931. He was born in Munich and died in Germany.

== Selected filmography ==
- The Monastery's Hunter (1920)
- Night of the Burglar (1921)
- Nathan the Wise (1922)
- The Favourite of the Queen (1922)
- Maciste and the Chinese Chest (1923)
- Helena (1924)
- The Path to God (1924)
- Two People (1924)
- Hunted Men (1924)
- Mrs Worrington's Perfume (1925)
- The Shot in the Pavilion (1925)
- Written in the Stars (1925)
- Hidden Fires (1925)
- Your Desire Is Sin (1925)
- A Song from Days of Youth (1925)
- Reluctant Imposter (1925)
- The Pleasure Garden (1925)
- The Seventh Son (1926)
- The Hunter of Fall (1926)
- The Mountain Eagle (1927)
- The Queen of the Variety (1927)
- Restless Hearts (1928)
- Behind Monastery Walls (1928)
- The Women's War (1928)
- The Foreign Legionnaire (1928)
- The Eccentric (1929)
- When the White Lilacs Bloom Again (1929)
- The Emperor's Sweetheart (1931)
