= Franz Seitz Sr. =

German film director (1887–1952)

- Born: 14 April 1887; Munich, German Empire
- Died: 7 March 1952 (aged 64); Schliersee, West Germany
- Occupations: Film director Screenwriter
- Years active: 1920–1951

Franz Seitz Sr. (14 April 1887 – 7 March 1952) was a German film director and screenwriter. He directed 59 films between 1920 and 1951. His son Franz Seitz Jr. was a film producer.

In 1933, he directed S.A.-Mann Brand, one of the first propaganda films made after the instauration of the Nazi regime in Germany. While expounding the purported virtues of joining the ranks of the Nazi Party, the film is notable for the absence of any antisemitic themes.

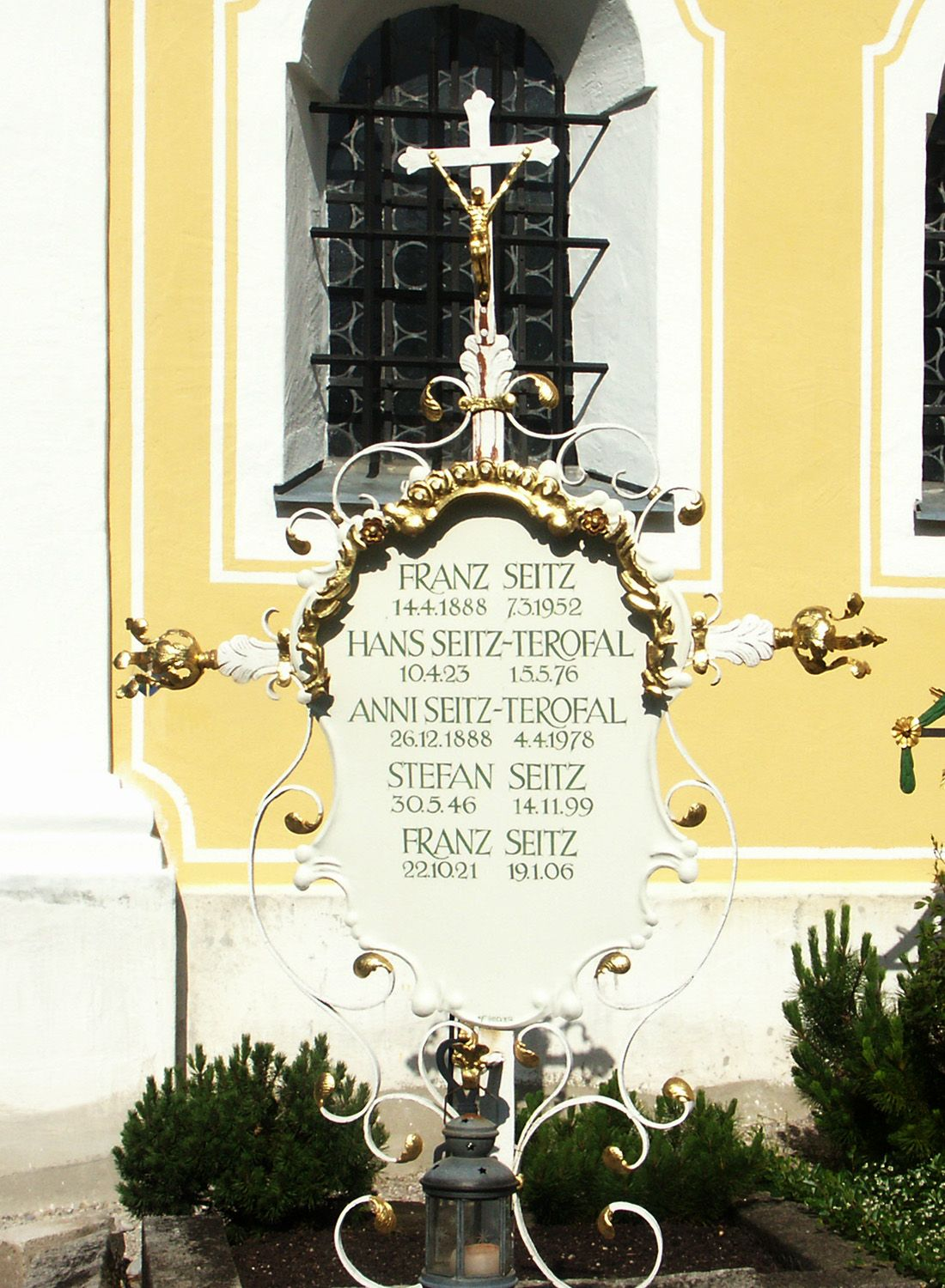
Seitz-Grab

== Selected filmography ==
- The Face Removed (1920)
- The Masked Ones (1920)
- The Testament of Billions (1920)
- The Favourite of the Queen (1922)
- The Emperor's Old Clothes (1923)
- The Path to God (1924)
- The Adventurous Wedding (1925)
- Mrs Worrington's Perfume (1925)
- The Hunter of Fall (1926)
- The Merry Farmer (1927)
- Poor Little Colombine (1927)
- The Gambling Den of Montmartre (1928)
- Almenrausch and Edelweiss (1928)
- The Women's War (1928)
- Behind Monastery Walls (1928)
- Left of the Isar, Right of the Spree (1929)
- The Chaste Coquette (1929)
- The Champion Shot (1932)
- The Master Detective (1933)
- S.A.-Mann Brand (1933)
- At Blonde Kathrein's Place (1934)
- The Tannhof Women (1934)
- Between Heaven and Earth (1934)
- There Were Two Bachelors (1936)
- The Unsuspecting Angel (1936)
- Judgement Day (1940)
- Two in One Suit (1950)
- The Last Shot (1951)
