= Georg H. Schnell =

German actor (1878–1951)

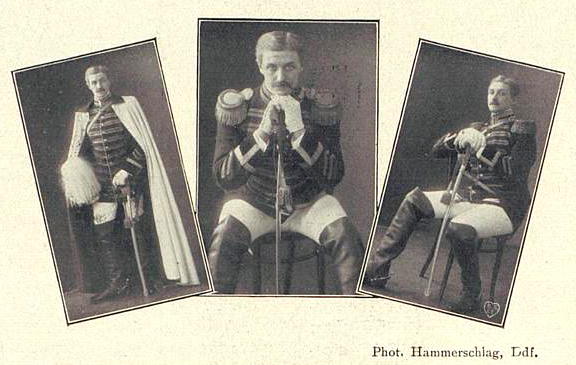
- Schnell in 1911
- Born: 11 April 1878; Yantai, Qing Empire
- Died: 31 March 1951 (aged 72); West Berlin, West Germany
- Other names: Georg H. Schnell, G.H. Schnell
- Website: http://www.cyranos.ch/smschn-d.htm

Georg Heinrich Schnell (11 April 1878 – 31 March 1951) was a German actor who remains perhaps best-known for his role as shipowner Harding in Nosferatu, eine Symphonie des Grauens (1922). Georg appeared in over one hundred films.

He was born in Yantai, China. He died in West Berlin, West Germany.

Georg is sometimes credited as G.H. Schnell, Georg Heinrich Schnell, Georg Schnell/Schnell and George Snell.

== Selected filmography ==
- Her Sport (1919)
- Alkohol (1919)
- The Spinning Ball (1919)
- Panic in the House of Ardon (1920)
- The Tragedy of a Great (1920)
- The Red Poster (1920)
- The Haunting of Castle Kitay (1920)
- Dolls of Death (1920)
- The Hunt for the Truth (1921)
- The Secret of Santa Maria (1921)
- The Woman in the Trunk (1921)
- The Thirteen of Steel (1921)
- The Amazon (1921)
- Miss Julie (1922)
- The False Dimitri (1922)
- Nosferatu (1922)
- Marie Antoinette, the Love of a King (1922)
- The Terror of the Sea (1924)
- The Tragedy of a Night of Passion (1924)
- Love of Life (1924)
- To a Woman of Honour (1924)
- A Free People (1925)
- The Searching Soul (1925)
- A Song from Days of Youth (1925)
- Written in the Stars (1925)
- The Pleasure Garden (1925)
- The Mill at Sanssouci (1926)
- The Good Reputation (1926)
- The Pride of the Company (1926)
- Bigamie (1927)
- Did You Fall in Love Along the Beautiful Rhine? (1927)
- The Eighteen Year Old (1927)
- Hurrah! I Live! (1928)
- Modern Pirates (1928)
- The Flame of Love (1930)
- The Immortal Vagabond (1930)
- The Road to Dishonour (1930)
- Circus Life (1931)
- The Emperor's Sweetheart (1931)
- Danton (1931)
- My Wife, the Impostor (1931)
- In the Employ of the Secret Service (1931)
- Tannenberg (1932)
- Contest (1932)
- Holiday From Myself (1934)
- William Tell (1934)
- The Champion of Pontresina (1934)
- The Island (1934)
- Police Report (1934)
- The Riders of German East Africa (1934)
- Sergeant Schwenke (1935)
- The Valley of Love (1935)
- The Castle in Flanders (1936)
- Alarm in Peking (1937)
- Madame Bovary (1937)
- When Women Keep Silent (1937)
- Seven Slaps (1937)
- The Chief Witness (1937)
- The Coral Princess (1937)
- An Enemy of the People (1937)
- The Night of Decision (1938)
- The Girl of Last Night (1938)
- The Impossible Mister Pitt (1938)
- The Great and the Little Love (1938)
- By a Silken Thread (1938)
- Shoulder Arms (1939)
- The Right to Love (1939)
- Passion (1940)
- Carl Peters (1941)
- The Eternal Tone (1943)
- Die Feuerzangenbowle (1944)
- Nora (1944)
