= List of German films of 1923 =

This is a list of the most notable films produced in the Cinema of Germany in 1923.

Title	Director	Cast	Genre	Notes
1923
Adam and Eve	Reinhold Schünzel	Werner Krauss, Dagny Servaes, Rudolf Forster	Drama	
The Affair of Baroness Orlovska	Hans Werckmeister	Willy Kaiser-Heyl, Dary Holm, Viktor Gehring	Drama	
All for Money	Reinhold Schünzel	Emil Jannings, Dagny Servaes, Hermann Thimig	Drama	
The Almighty Dollar	Jaap Speyer	Charles Willy Kayser, Eduard von Winterstein	Silent	
The Ancient Law	E. A. Dupont	Henny Porten, Ruth Weyher, Hermann Vallentin	Drama	
And Yet Luck Came	Gerhard Lamprecht	Grete Diercks, Eduard Rothauser, Heinrich Schroth	Silent	
Die Austreibung - die Macht der zweiten Frau (The Expulsion - The Power of the Second Woman)	Friedrich Wilhelm Murnau			Presumed lost filmIMDb
The Beautiful Girl	Max Mack	Hella Moja, Fritz Richard	Silent	
Between Evening and Morning	Arthur Robison	Werner Krauss, Agnes Straub		
Black Earth	Franz Hofer	Loni Nest, Anna von Palen	Silent	
Bob and Mary	Max Glass	Helga Molander, Anton Edthofer	Silent	
The Burning Secret	Rochus Gliese	Ernst Deutsch, Otto Gebühr	Drama	
Certificates of Death	Lothar Mendes	Alfred Abel, Eva May, Iván Petrovich	Drama	
The Chain Clinks	Paul L. Stein	Ressel Orla, Alfons Fryland, Grete Diercks	Silent	
Christopher Columbus	Márton Garas	Albert Bassermann, Elsa Bassermann	Historical	
City in View	Henrik Galeen	Harry Nestor, Edith Posca	Drama	
Count Cohn	Carl Boese	Hermann Vallentin, Xenia Desni, Frida Richard	Silent	
The Countess of Paris	Dimitri Buchowetzki, Joe May	Mia May, Emil Jannings	Silent	
Daisy	Frederic Zelnik	Lya Mara, Alfons Fryland	Drama	
Demon Circus	Emil Justitz	Gertrude Welcker, Eduard von Winterstein, Carl de Vogt	Drama	
The Doll Maker of Kiang-Ning	Robert Wiene	Werner Krauss, Lia Eibenschütz	Fantasy	
Downfall	Ludwig Wolff	Asta Nielsen, Gregori Chmara	Drama	
The Duke of Aleria	Heinz Schall	Johannes Riemann, Lina Lossen, Erich Kaiser-Titz	Silent	
Earth Spirit	Leopold Jessner	Asta Nielsen, Albert Bassermann	Drama	
The Emperor's Old Clothes	Franz Seitz	Dary Holm, Ernst Rückert	Silent	
Explosion	Karl Grune	Liane Haid, Carl de Vogt	Drama	
Felicitas Grolandin	Rudolf Biebrach	Hella Moja, Theodor Becker	Silent	
The Fifth Street	Martin Hartwig	Lucy Doraine, Ernst Hofmann	Silent	
The Flame	Ernst Lubitsch	Pola Negri, Hermann Thimig	Drama	
Die Fledermaus	Max Mack	Eva May, Lya De Putti, Harry Liedtke	Comedy	
The Frankish Song	Hubert Moest	Heinrich George, Eduard von Winterstein	Silent	
Franzens Lebensrettung - Ein Erlebnis unter den Wilden	Georg Germroth		animation	
Frauenmoral	Theo Frenkel	Helena Makowska, Oskar Marion	Silent	
Fräulein Raffke	Richard Eichberg	Werner Krauss, Lydia Potechina	Silent	
Friedrich Schiller	Curt Goetz	Theodor Loos, Hermann Vallentin	Historical	
Friend Ripp	Alfred Halm	Charles Puffy, Käthe Haack	Silent	
The Girl from Hell	Frederic Zelnik	Lya Mara, Carl Auen, Harald Paulsen	Silent	
A Glass of Water	Ludwig Berger	Mady Christians, Lucie Höflich, Rudolf Rittner	Historical	
Gold and Luck	Adolf Trotz	Conrad Veidt, Erna Morena, Eduard von Winterstein	Silent	
Golem zaubert			documentary	
The Great Industrialist	Fritz Kaufmann	Maria Forescu, Erich Kaiser-Titz	Silent	
The Green Manuela	E. A. Dupont	Lucie Labass, Grete Berger	Drama	
Hallig Hooge	Carl Froelich	Evi Eva, Willy Fritsch	Silent	
Das Herz des Menschen	Bernhard Villinger		documentary	
His Wife, The Unknown	Benjamin Christensen	Willy Fritsch, Lil Dagover	Drama	
The House Without Laughter	Gerhard Lamprecht	Henrik Galeen, Mathilde Sussin, Edith Posca	drama	
The Hungarian Princess	Werner Funck	Margarete Schlegel, Adele Sandrock, Adolf Klein	Silent	
I Had a Comrade	Hans Felsing	Willy Kaiser-Heyl, Henri Peters-Arnolds, Margit Barnay	Silent	
Inge Larsen	Hans Steinhoff	Henny Porten, Paul Otto	Drama	
I.N.R.I.	Robert Wiene	Gregori Chmara, Henny Porten	Religious epic	aka Crown of Thorns; dramatic portrayal of the life of Christ
Irene of Gold	Frederic Zelnik	Margarete Schlegel, Hans Albers	Silent	
The Island of Tears	Lothar Mendes	Lya De Putti, Paul Wegener, Lyda Salmonova	Silent	
Jimmy: The Tale of a Girl and Her Bear	Jaap Speyer	Mia Pankau, Ernst Hofmann, Margarete Lanner	Silent	
The Journey to Happiness	Heinrich Bolten-Baeckers	Leo Peukert, Olga Tschechowa, Camilla Spira	Silent	
Khasana, das Tempelmädchen	Julius Pinschewer, Toni Raboldt		animation	
King of Women	Jaap Speyer	Georg Alexander, Stella Arbenina, Ralph Arthur Roberts	Comedy	
La Boheme	Gennaro Righelli	Maria Jacobini, Elena Lunda, Walter Janssen	Drama	
The Last Battle	Harry Piel	Harry Piel, Karl Platen	Thriller	
The Little Napoleon	Georg Jacoby	Paul Heidemann, Harry Liedtke, Marlene Dietrich	Historical	
The Lost Shoe	Ludwig Berger	Helga Thomas, Paul Hartmann, Mady Christians	Fantasy	
The Love of a Queen	Ludwig Wolff	Harry Liedtke, Henny Porten, Walter Janssen	Historical	
Lyda Ssanin	Frederic Zelnik	Lya Mara, Hans Albers	Silent	
Maciste and Prisoner 51	Luigi Romano Borgnetto	Bartolomeo Pagano, Karl Beckersachs	Action	
Maciste and the Chinese Chest	Carl Boese	Bartolomeo Pagano, Rudolf Lettinger, Jakob Tiedtke	Action	
The Maharaja's Victory	Joseph Delmont	Luciano Albertini, Erich Kaiser-Titz, Wilhelm Diegelmann	Silent	
Man by the Wayside	William Dieterle	Alexander Granach, Emilia Unda	Drama	
The Man in the Iron Mask	Max Glass	Albert Bassermann, Bruno Decarli, Helga Molander	Adventure	
Martin Luther	Karl Wüstenhagen	Dary Holm, Anton Walbrook	Historical	
The Men of Sybill	Frederic Zelnik	Lya Mara, Carl Auen, Rudolf Forster	Drama	
The Merchant of Venice	Peter Paul Felner	Werner Krauss, Henny Porten	Shakespeare	
Das Milliardensouper	Victor Janson	Ossi Oswalda, Georg Alexander, Paul Biensfeldt	Comedy	
The Misanthrope	Rudolf Walther-Fein	Werner Krauss, Dagny Servaes, Reinhold Schünzel	Silent	
The Money Devil	Heinz Goldberg	Stella Arbenina, Karl Forest, Otto Gebühr	Drama	
Mysterien eines Frisiersalons (Mysteries of a Barbershop)	Bertolt Brecht, Erich Engel	Erwin Faber, Max Shreck, Blandine Ebinger, Josef Eichheim, Hans Leibelt, Carola Neher, Otto Wernicke	"Surreal Comedy/Romance"	16 minutes; considered one of the 100 most important German films
A Night's Adventure	Harry Piel	Harry Piel, Lissy Arna	Thriller	
Nora	Berthold Viertel	Olga Chekhova, Carl Ebert, Fritz Kortner	Drama	
Old Heidelberg	Hans Behrendt	Paul Hartmann, Eva May	Drama	
Paganini	Heinz Goldberg	Conrad Veidt, Eva May, Greta Schröder	Historical	
The Pagoda	Alfred Fekete	Olga Chekhova, Ernst Deutsch, William Dieterle	Silent	
Paradise in the Snow	Georg Jacoby	Bruno Kastner, Elga Brink	Silent	
The Pilgrimage of Love	Yakov Protazanov	Gustav von Wangenheim, Charlotte Ander	Drama	
Poor Sinner	Pier Antonio Gariazzo	Alfred Abel, Diana Karenne, Fritz Kortner	Drama	
Princess Suwarin	Johannes Guter	Lil Dagover, Heinrich Schroth, Xenia Desni	Silent	
Quarantine	Max Mack	Rudolf Lettinger, Helena Makowska, Loni Nest	Silent	
Raskolnikow	Robert Wiene	Gregori Chmara, Alla Tarasova	Drama	
The Red Rider	Franz W. Koebner	Fern Andra, Albert Steinrück, Carola Toelle	Silent	
Resurrection	Frederic Zelnik	Lya Mara, Rudolf Forster, Lydia Potechina	Drama	
Rivals	Harry Piel	Harry Piel, Adolf Klein	Adventure	
The Second Shot	Maurice Krol	William Dieterle, Anton Pointner, Helga Thomas	Silent	
The Secret of Brinkenhof	Svend Gade	Henny Porten, Paul Henckels	Drama	
The Secret of the Duchess	Klaus Albrecht	Nils Asther, Stella Arbenina, Arnold Korff	Drama	
The Sensational Trial	Karl Freund	Erich Kaiser-Titz, Käthe Haack, Heinrich Schroth	Silent	
The Slipper Hero	Reinhold Schünzel	Reinhold Schünzel, Liane Haid, Paul Hartmann	Comedy	Co-production with Austria
The Spessart Inn	Adolf Wenter	Dary Holm, Ellen Kürti	Comedy	
The Stone Rider	Fritz Wendhausen	Rudolf Klein-Rogge, Lucie Mannheim	Drama	
The Street	Karl Grune	Eugen Klöpfer, Aud Egede-Nissen, Max Schreck	Drama	
Südtirol - Ein Vorposten deutscher Kultur	Wollenberg	Hans Schneeberger, Deodatus Tauern, Luis Trenker	documentary	
The Sun of St. Moritz	Hubert Moest	Hedda Vernon, Grete Diercks	Drama	
Tatjana	Robert Dinesen	Olga Chekhova, Paul Hartmann, Leopold von Ledebur	Silent	
Thou Shalt Not Kill	Fritz Hofbauer	Werner Krauss, Emil Jannings	Silent	
The Three Marys	Reinhold Schünzel	Anita Berber, Lya De Putti	Silent	Co-production with Austria
The Tiger of Circus Farini	Uwe Jens Krafft	Helena Makowska, Arnold Korff	Silent	
Time Is Money	Fred Sauer	Grete Reinwald, Colette Corder, Fritz Rasp	Silent	
Tragedy of Love	Joe May	Mia May, Emil Jannings	Silent	
The Treasure	Georg Wilhelm Pabst	Albert Steinrück, Lucie Mannheim, Ilka Grüning	Drama	Pabst's debut film
The Treasure of Gesine Jacobsen	Rudolf Walther-Fein	Marija Leiko, Paul Wegener, Reinhold Schünzel	Drama	
The Unknown Tomorrow	Alexander Korda	Werner Krauss, María Corda	Melodrama	
Vineta, the Sunken City	Werner Funck	Stella Arbenina, Heinrich Schroth, Gustav Diessl	Drama	
Victim of Love	Martin Hartwig	Lucy Doraine, Alfons Fryland	Drama	
The Vice of Gambling	Dimitri Buchowetzki	Alfred Abel, Sybill Morel	Silent	
The Violin King	Karl Otto Krause	Sybill Morel, Franz Rauch, Maria Zelenka	Silent	
Warning Shadows	Arthur Robison, Rudolf Schneider	Fritz Kortner, Alexander Granach, Ruth Weyher	Horror	
The Way to the Light	Géza von Bolváry	Gustav Fröhlich, Helene von Bolváry	Silent	
The Weather Station	Carl Froelich	Mady Christians, Albert Steinrück	Silent	
The Wheels of Destiny	Franz Osten	Colette Brettel, Ellen Kürti	Silent	
William Tell	Rudolf Dworsky, Rudolf Walther-Fein	Hans Marr, Conrad Veidt	Historical	
A Woman, an Animal, a Diamond	Hanns Kobe	Charlotte Ander, Fritz Kortner, Paul Bildt	Silent	
The Woman from the Orient	Wolfgang Neff	Oskar Marion, Hedda Vernon, Dary Holm	Silent	
The Woman on the Panther	Alfred Halm	Grete Reinwald, Hermann Thimig, Olga Limburg	Silent	
The Woman Worth Millions	Willi Wolff	Ellen Richter, Georg Alexander, Hugo Flink	Silent	
Zaida, the Tragedy of a Model	Holger-Madsen	Gertrude Welcker, Alf Blütecher, Alexander Murski	Silent	
Die Zwei und der Schiffer	Hans-Jürgen Völcker		documentary	
