= The Royal Grenadiers (1925 film) =

1925 film directed by Géza von Bolváry

- Directed by: Géza von Bolváry
- Written by: Margarete-Maria Langen
- Starring: Heinrich Seitz; Ruth Carel; Carl Walther Meyer
- Production company: Bavaria Film
- Distributed by: Bavaria Film
- Release date: 6 March 1925
- Country: Germany
- Languages: Silent; German intertitles

The Royal Grenadiers (German: Die Königsgrenadiere) is a 1925 German silent film directed by Géza von Bolváry and starring Heinrich Seitz, Ruth Carel, and Carl Walther Meyer.

It was shot at the Emelka Studios in Munich.

== Cast ==
- Heinrich Seitz as Oberst v. Seldeneck
- Ruth Carel as Annemarie
- Carl Walther Meyer as Leutnant von Maltz
- Karl Pott as v. Wangenheim
- Helene von Bolváry as Frau von Brandenstein
- Ernst Dernburg as Oskar Gernsbach
- Richard Koutensky as Franz
- Adolf Grell as Feldwebel
- Gida von Lazar as der kleine Kurt von Maltz

== Bibliography ==
- Bock, Hans-Michael; Bergfelder, Tim, eds. (2009). The Concise Cinegraph: Encyclopaedia of German Cinema. New York: Berghahn Books. ISBN 978-1-57181-655-9.
