= Fräulein Mama =

1926 film directed by Géza von Bolváry

- Directed by: Géza von Bolváry
- Written by: Walter Jerven
- Starring: Grete Reinwald; Walter Janssen; Ferdinand von Alten
- Cinematography: Hans Karl Gottschalk
- Production company: Ewe-Film
- Distributed by: Bavaria Film
- Release date: 12 November 1926
- Country: Germany
- Languages: Silent; German intertitles

Fräulein Mama is a 1926 German silent film directed by Géza von Bolváry and starring Grete Reinwald, Walter Janssen, and Ferdinand von Alten.

The film's sets were designed by the art directors Peter Rochelsberg and Otto Völckers.

== Cast ==
- Grete Reinwald
- Walter Janssen
- Ferdinand von Alten
- Margarete Kupfer
- Nikolai Malikoff
- Hélène Hallier
- Ellen Heel

== Bibliography ==
- Krautz, Alfred (1984). International Directory of Cinematographers, Set- and Costume Designers in Film. Vol. 4. Munich: Saur. ISBN 978-3-598-21434-9.
