= The Queen of the Variety =

1927 film directed by Johannes Guter

- Directed by: Johannes Guter
- Written by: Walter Jerven
- Starring: Ellen Kürti; Harry Halm; Ferdinand Martini
- Cinematography: Hans Karl Gottschalk
- Music by: Hans May
- Production company: Ewe-Film
- Distributed by: Matador-Film
- Release date: 1 June 1927
- Country: Germany
- Languages: Silent; German intertitles

The Queen of the Variety (German: Die Königin des Varietés) is a 1927 German silent comedy film directed by Johannes Guter and starring Ellen Kürti, Harry Halm and Ferdinand Martini. The film's sets were designed by the art directors Peter Rochelsberg and Otto Völckers.

== Cast ==
- Ellen Kürti as Lola Carelli
- Harry Halm as Teddy Holl
- Bobbie Bender as Walter Steiner
- Hélène Hallier as Helga
- Ferdinand Martini as Heinrich Arndt
- Gyula Szöreghy

== Bibliography ==
- Bock, Hans-Michael & Bergfelder, Tim. The Concise CineGraph. Encyclopedia of German Cinema. Berghahn Books, 2009.
