= The Night of Decision =

The Night of Decision may refer to:

- The Night of Decision (1920 film), a silent German film directed by Franz Osten
- The Night of Decision (1931 film), an American film directed by Dimitri Buchowetzki
- The Night of Decision (1938 film), a German film directed by Nunzio Malasomma
- Night of Decision, a 1956 West German film directed by Falk Harnack
