= Pathways of Life =

Pathways of Life may refer to:

- Pathways of Life (1916 film), an American silent short drama film
- Pathways of Life (1918 film), a German silent film
