= The Fateful Day =

The Fateful Day may refer to:

- The Fateful Day (1995 film), an Iranian Islamic film
- The Fateful Day (1921 film), a German silent film
