= Nocturne of Love =

Nocturne of Love may refer to:

- Nocturne of Love (1919 film), a silent German film directed by Carl Boese
- Nocturne of Love (1948 film), a Mexican film directed by Emilio Gómez Muriel
