= Hallig Hooge =

1923 film

- Directed by: Carl Froelich
- Written by: Anny Wothe
- Starring: Dora Bergner; Evi Eva; Willy Fritsch
- Cinematography: Albert Schattmann
- Production company: Solar-Film
- Distributed by: Solar-Film
- Release date: 17 January 1923
- Country: Germany
- Languages: Silent; German intertitles

Hallig Hooge is a 1923 German silent film directed by Carl Froelich and starring Dora Bergner, Evi Eva and Willy Fritsch.

The film's sets were designed by Botho Hoefer.

== Cast ==
In alphabetical order

- Dora Bergner as Britta
- Evi Eva as Eike
- Willy Fritsch as Tetze Tetens
- Werner Funck as Ow Erkel - Lehrer
- Fritz Kampers as Marne Rieckmers
- Viggo Larsen as Holm von Thümen
- Clementine Plessner as Stine
- Claire Reigbert as Trine
- Ludwig Rex
- Eva Seeberg as Jutta von Este
- Lotte Spira as Elga von Hohenhorst
- Hella Thornegg
- Hans Tillo as Frithjo

== Bibliography ==
- Hans-Michael Bock and Tim Bergfelder. The Concise Cinegraph: An Encyclopedia of German Cinema. Berghahn Books.
