= List of films about Martin Luther =

The life of church reformer and theologian Martin Luther (November 10, 1483 - February 18, 1546) has inspired a number of adaptations of the events of the Reformation for both television and film. Some of these have been large-budget, major studio productions, while others have been produced by local Lutheran church bodies.

== Film ==
Date	Title	Luther portrayed by	Notes
1923	Martin Luther	Karl Wüstenhagen	Released by Luther-Film
1928	Luther	Eugen Klöpfer	Released by Cobb Studios Filmed in Berlin, Germany; Theodor Loos played Melanthon
1953	Martin Luther	Niall MacGinnis	directed by Irving Pichel Academy Award nominations for black & white cinematography and art/set direction Re-released in 2002 on DVD in 4 languages.
1973	Luther	Stacy Keach	A film adaptation of the John Osborne play Luther, written by Edward Anhalt and released by Cinévision Ltée. Other actors included Patrick Magee, Hugh Griffith and Judi Dench.
1981	Where Luther Walked	N/A	A documentary about the life of Martin Luther, narrated by the scholar Roland Bainton
1983	Martin Luther, Heretic	Jonathan Pryce	A BBC production.
2002	Here I Stand: The Life and Legacy of Martin Luther	Wink Martindale	A biography of the Reformer, released direct to video by Lathika International Film & Entertainment Inc.
2003	Luther	Joseph Fiennes	Released by Eikon Film and partially funded by Thrivent Financial for Lutherans. Other actors included Alfred Molina, Jonathan Firth, and Peter Ustinov
2017	Luther: The Life and Legacy of the German Reformer	N/A	Released by Stephen McCaskell Films.

== Television ==
Date	Title	Luther portrayed by	Description
1964	Martin Luther	Terry Norris	An Australian adaptation of the John Osborne play Luther for television
1965	Play of the Month	Alec McCowen	A BBC adaptation of the John Osborne play Luther.
1983	Martin Luther	Lambert Hamel	A German-language television documentary, directed by Rainer Wolffhardt and released by Eikon Film.
2001	Opening the Door to Luther	N/A	A PBS travelogue, hosted by Rick Steves and sponsored by the Evangelical Lutheran Church in America.
2002	Martin Luther	Timothy West	Part of the PBS Empires series. Narrated by Liam Neeson

== Theatre ==
Date	Title	Luther portrayed by	Notes
2017	Martin Luther	Andreas Robichaux	Produced by Puritan Productions Staged in Dallas-Ft. Worth, Texas
