= Paula Barra =

German actress

Paula Barra was a German film actress. She starred in several films including the 1918 Max Nivelli film Pathways to Life, the 1919 film The Peace Rider, and the 1920 film The Air Pirates

== Filmography ==
- The Lord of Hohenstein (1917)
- Pathways of Life (1918)
- The Peace Rider (Der Friedensreiter) (1919) as Victorine de Brion
- Der Große Coup (1919) directed by Harry Piel
- Christian Wahnschaffe (1920)
- The Air Pirates (Die Luftpiraten) (1920)
- The Pink Jersey (Das rosa Trikot) (1920) directed by Léo Lasko
