= Women Who Fall by the Wayside =

1925 film directed by Géza von Bolváry

- Directed by: Géza von Bolváry
- Written by: Karl Bolwag
- Starring: Ellen Kürti; Olaf Fjord; Carl Walther Meyer
- Cinematography: Hans Karl Gottschalk
- Production company: Ewe-Film
- Distributed by: Bavaria Film
- Release date: 15 July 1925
- Country: Germany
- Languages: Silent; German intertitles

Women Who Fall by the Wayside (German: Frauen, die vom Weg abirren) is a 1925 German silent drama film directed by Géza von Bolváry and starring Ellen Kürti, Olaf Fjord, and Carl Walther Meyer.

It was made by Bavaria Film at the company's Emelka Studios in Munich. The film's sets were designed by the art directors Peter Rochelsberg and Otto Völckers.

== Cast ==
- Ellen Kürti as Yvonne
- Olaf Fjord as Gaston Dupont
- Carl Walther Meyer as Paul Vanée
- Lotte Klinder as Marga, seine Schwester
- Paul Otto as Baron de la Rive
- Elena Lunda as Marchesa Pasquali
- Lo Etthoff
- Georg Henrich
- Helene von Bolváry
- Gida von Lazar

== Bibliography ==
- Grange, William (2008). Cultural Chronicle of the Weimar Republic. Lanham, MD: Scarecrow Press. ISBN 978-0-8108-5967-8.
