= The Spessart Inn (1923 film) =

1923 film

- Directed by: Adolf Wenter
- Written by: Wilhelm Hauff (novel); Margarete-Maria Langen
- Cinematography: Ewald Daub
- Production company: Orbis-Film
- Release date: 25 May 1923
- Country: Germany
- Language: Silent with German intertitles

The Spessart Inn (German: Das Wirtshaus im Spessart) is a 1923 German silent film directed by Adolf Wenter. In 1958 it was remade as a musical film of the same title.

== Cast ==
- Elise Aulinger
- Fritz Berger
- Fritz Gugenheim
- Dary Holm
- Lietta Korff
- Ellen Kürti
- John Mylong
- Rio Nobile
- Rolf Pinegger
- Hans Staufen
- Georg Stettner
- Ludwig Wengg
- Karl Wüstenhagen

== Bibliography ==
- Grange, William. Cultural Chronicle of the Weimar Republic. Scarecrow Press, 2008.
