= Géza von Bolváry =

Hungarian actor and filmmaker

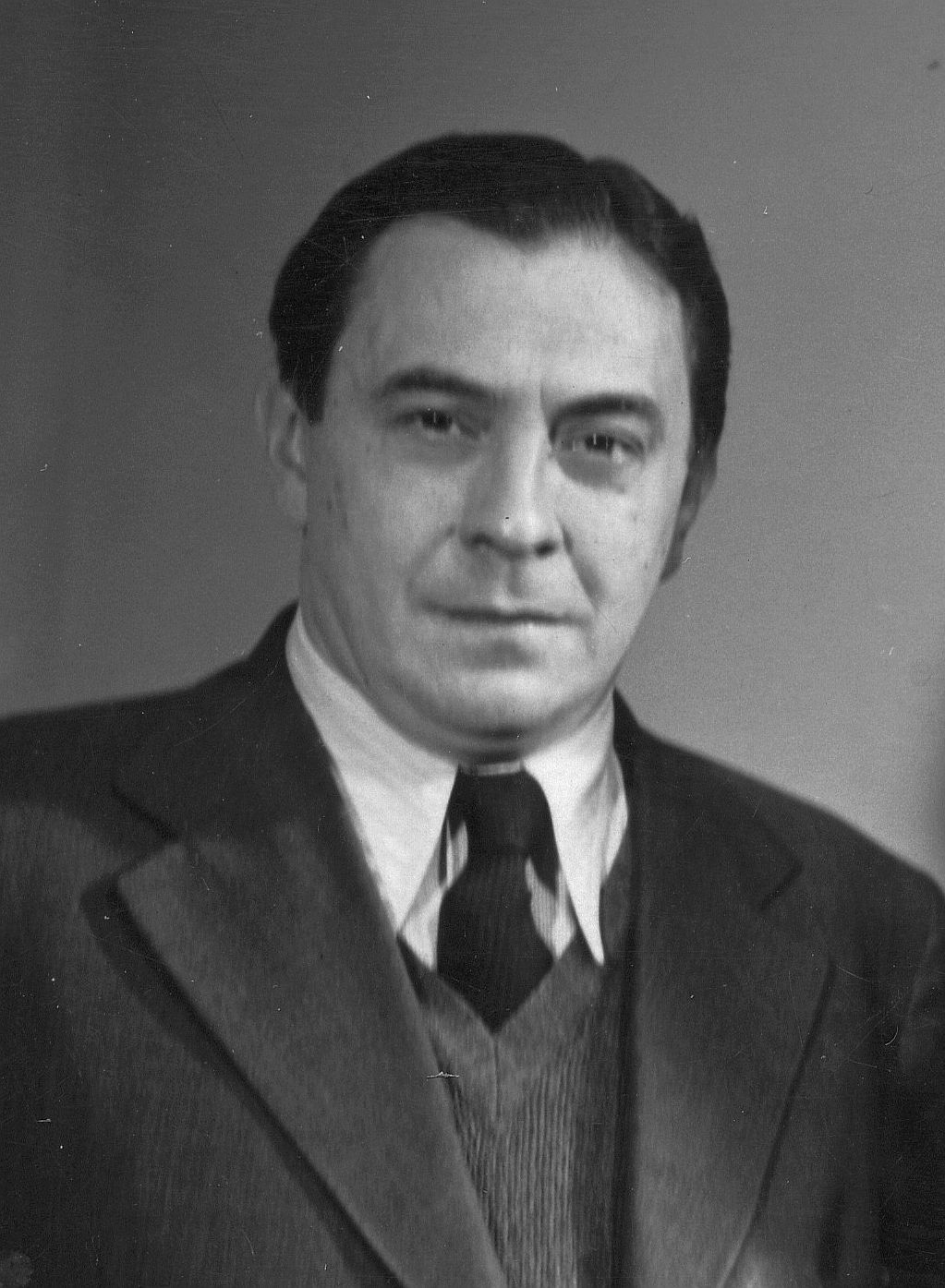
- Bolváry in 1938
- Born: Bolváry Zahn Géza Gyula Mária; 26 December 1897; Budapest, Austria-Hungary
- Died: 10 August 1961 (aged 63); Altenbeuern, West Germany
- Occupations: Actor, screenwriter, film director
- Years active: 1920–1958
- Spouse: Helene von Bolváry (m. 1921; died 1943)

Géza von Bolváry (born Géza Gyula Mária Bolváry Zahn, German: Géza Maria von Bolváry-Zahn; 26 December 1897 – 10 August 1961) was a Hungarian actor, screenwriter, and film director, who worked principally in Germany and Austria.

== Biography ==
Géza von Bolváry was born in Budapest. He attended the Imperial Military Academy in Budapest and subsequently served in the Hungarian army (Honved Hussars). After World War I he left military service with the rank of Royal Hungarian Rittmeister. He then earned his living in the new Hungarian film industry. He began his career around 1920 as an actor in various silent films, but soon changed to the Star-Film company, where he was first active as a director and made his debut as director and screenwriter with A Kétarcú asszony.

In 1922, the film concern Emelka in Munich hired him as a director for four years. Between 1926 and 1928 he worked for the firm Felsom Film in Berlin, after which he went to London for a year to work for British International Pictures. After returning to Berlin, he worked until 1933 with Superfilm Berlin and then until 1935 with Boston Films, also in Berlin. From 1936 Bolváry worked for a number of production companies in Vienna, notably for Styria-Film, Terra-Film and Wien-Film.

After World War II Bolváry went to Rome and up to 1949 made a number of films as director for Cinopera. During this time Bolváry was also active as director of operettas at the Volksoper in Vienna. In 1950 he settled in Munich and four years later was promoted chief of production of Starfilm. Between 1920 and 1958, when he made his last films, he directed about 100 films and also wrote scripts from time to time.

== Personal life and death ==
Aged 63, he died of heart disease on 10 August 1961 in Altenbeuern (now Neubeuern), near Rosenheim in Bavaria, Germany. He was married to the film actress Helene von Bolváry from 1921 until her death in 1943.

== Filmography ==
- A tisztesség nevében (1920; script only)
- Kétarcú asszony (1920; also wrote the script)
- Tavaszi szerelem (1921; also wrote the script)
- Meseország (1922)
- Egy fiúnak a fele (1922; also wrote the script)
- Mutterherz (1923)
- The Way to the Light (1923)
- Wüstenrausch (1923)
- Girls You Don't Marry (1924)
- Reluctant Imposter (1925)
- The Royal Grenadiers (1925)
- Women Who Fall by the Wayside (1925)
- The Love of the Bajadere (1925)
- The Princess of the Riviera (1926)
- The Heart of a German Mother (1926)
- Fräulein Mama (1926)
- The Prisoners of Shanghai (1927)
- Ghost Train (1927)
- Artists (1928)
- Number 17 (1928)
- The Gallant Hussar (1928)
- Bright Eyes (1929)
- The Vagabond Queen (1929)
- The Wrecker (1929)
- My Daughter's Tutor (1929)
- Father and Son (1929)
- Delicatessen (1930)
- Two Hearts in Waltz Time (1930)
- A Tango for You (1930)
- The Song Is Ended (1930)
- A Gentleman for Hire (1930)
- The Merry Wives of Vienna (1931)
- The Theft of the Mona Lisa (1931)
- Liebeskommando (1931)
- Ein Lied, ein Kuss, ein Mädel (1932)
- I Do Not Want to Know Who You Are (1932)
- A Man with Heart (1932)
- What Women Dream (1933)
- Die Nacht der großen Liebe (1933)
- The Castle in the South (1933)
- Dream Castle (1933)
- Scandal in Budapest (1933)
- Alles für die Frau (1933)
- Ich kenn' Dich nicht und liebe Dich (1934)
- Farewell Waltz (1934)
- Song of Farewell (1934)
- Spring Parade (1934)
- Winter Night's Dream (1935)
- Stradivari (1935)
- Stradivarius (1935)
- Es flüstert die Liebe (1935)
- Die Entführung (1936)
- The Castle in Flanders (1936)
- Girls' Dormitory (1936)
- Harvest (1936)
- Lumpaci the Vagabond (1936)
- Premiere (1937)
- The Irresistible Man (1937)
- The Charm of La Boheme (1937)
- Die unruhigen Mädchen (1938)
- Mirror of Life (1938)
- Flower of the Tisza (1939)
- Between River and Steppe (1939)
- Maria Ilona (1939)
- Opera Ball (1939)
- Vienna Tales (1940)
- Traummusik (1940)
- Roses in Tyrol (1940)
- Thrice Wed (1941)
- Destiny (1942)
- Die heimliche Gräfin (1942)
- The Dark Day (1943)
- A Man with Principles? (1943)
- Schrammeln (1944)
- Die Fledermaus (1945/46)
- Die tolle Susanne (1945)
- Who Is This That I Love? (1950)
- Ihre wunderbare Lüge (Addio, Mimi, 1950)
- Wedding Night in Paradise (1950)
- Dark Eyes (1951)
- My Wife Is Being Stupid (1952)
- Fritz and Friederike (1952)
- Once I Will Return (1953)
- The Daughter of the Regiment (1953)
- My Leopold (1955)
- Yes, Yes, Love in Tyrol (1955)
- Black Forest Melody (1956)
- Das Donkosakenlied (1956)
- Was die Schwalbe sang (1956)
- Hoch droben auf dem Berg (1957)
- Schön ist die Welt (1957)
- Es wird alles wieder gut (1957)
- Two Hearts in May (1957)
- It Happened Only Once (1958)
- Black Forest Cherry Schnapps (1958)
- Hoch klingt der Radetzkymarsch (1958)
- A Song Goes Round the World (1958)
