= Farewell (1930 film) =

1930 film

- Film poster
- Directed by: Robert Siodmak
- Written by: Emeric Pressburger; Irma von Cube
- Produced by: Bruno Duday
- Starring: Brigitte Horney; Aribert Mog; Emilia Unda
- Cinematography: Eugen Schüfftan
- Edited by: Emeric Pressburger
- Music by: Erwin Bootz
- Production company: UFA
- Distributed by: UFA
- Release date: 25 August 1930
- Running time: 80 minutes
- Country: Germany
- Language: German

Farewell (German: Abschied) is a 1930 German comedy drama film directed by Robert Siodmak and starring Brigitte Horney, Aribert Mog and Emilia Unda. It was shot at the Babelsberg Studios in Berlin. The film's sets were designed by the art director Max Knaake.

== Plot ==
Farewell (1930)

Peter Winkler and his fiancee Hella live together in Berlin, in a guesthouse called "Splendide", run by Mrs Weber. Peter and Hella seem to be the only happy people in the house, all others are misfits of various kinds. One day, Peter is offered a well paid position in Dresden. He is hoping that with greater professional success he will finally be able to marry Hella. In this joyful mood he tells the other guests about the news, but not Hella, who he wants to surprise. Unfortunately some of the guests can't keep a secret and so Hella learns of the news. She in turn doesn't tell Peter that she already had a dress and a hat laid away in a local store, without having the required amount of money. In this difficult situation she borrowed the money from another male guest at the guesthouse. While Hella is picking up her stuff at the store, Peter learns that Hella borrowed the money and thinks she cheated on him. Without waiting for her return, he leaves the guesthouse, never to come back.

== Cast ==
- Brigitte Horney as Hella, retailer
- Aribert Mog as Peter Winkler, traveling salesman
- Emilia Unda as Mrs. Weber
- Konstantin Mic as Bogdanoff
- Frank Günther as Neumann, master of ceremonies
- Erwin Bootz as Himself
- Martha Ziegler as Lina, maid-servant
- Vladimir Sokoloff as The Baron
- Esmée Symon as 1st Lennox-Sister
- Gisela Draeger as 2nd Lennox-Sister
- Marianne Mosner as 3rd Lennox-Sister
- Georg Nikolai
- Erwin Splettstößer
- Bruno Hoenscherle
- Daisy Rensburg

== Release ==
The film premiered on 25 August 1930 in Berlin.
