= The Courier from Lisbon =

1921 film

- Directed by: Ismar Stern
- Written by: Paul Rosenhayn
- Produced by: Ismar Stern
- Cinematography: Heinrich Gärtner
- Production company: Plutus-Film
- Distributed by: Ideal Film
- Release date: 27 July 1921
- Country: Germany
- Languages: Silent; German intertitles

The Courier from Lisbon (German: Der Kurier von Lissabon) is a 1921 German silent crime film directed by Ismar Stern.

The film's art direction was by Edmund Heuberger.

== Cast ==
In alphabetical order

- Gustav Botz
- Colette Corder
- Eric Harden
- Kurt Middendorf
- Heinrich Peer

== Bibliography ==
- Weniger, Kay (2011). "Es wird im Leben dir mehr genommen als gegeben...": Lexikon der aus Deutschland und Österreich emigrierten Filmschaffenden 1933 bis 1945. Berlin: Acabus. ISBN 978-3-86282-049-8.
