= Hermine Körner =

German actress, director and theater manager (1878–1960)

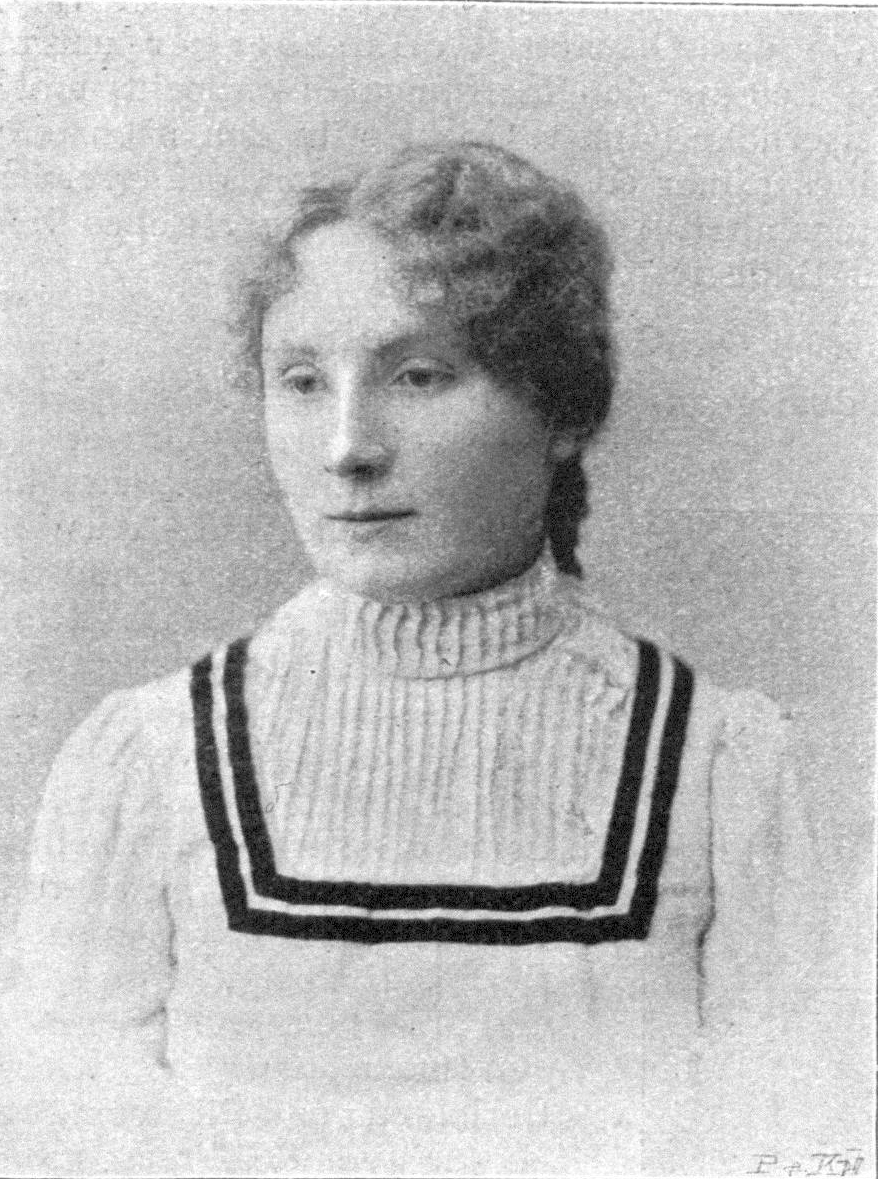
Hermine Körner, ca. 1900.

Hermine Körner (30 May 1878 in Berlin - 14 December 1960) was a German actress, director and theater manager.

== Early life ==
Körner was the fifth child of teacher and zoologist William Stader and Emilie Luyken. The father departed in 1880 on a lecture tour in the U.S. from which he did not return, he died on 28 February 1888 in Reading. The widowed mother moved with her five children from Berlin to her parents' house in Altenkirchen (Westerwald), where Körner spent her childhood. She studied piano at the Wiesbaden Conservatory from 1896 under Max Reger.

== Career ==
In Wiesbaden, she discovered her passion for the theater, which she shared with her lover, the Austrian officer Franz Ferdinand Körner. She married Körner on 23 December 1897. With the assistance of her father-in-law August Körner, an influential Viennese banker, she was given the opportunity to audition for the director general of the Vienna Court Opera. Körner debuted in 1898 at Vienna's Burgtheater and eventually obtained an engagement at the Emperor's Jubilee Theatre. From 1905 to 1909 Körner played in the Düsseldorfer Schauspielhaus under Louise Dumont and her husband Gustav Lindemann, but went to the Court Theatre in 1909 in Dresden. In 1915, Max Reinhardt brought her to the Deutsches Theater in Berlin. In Stuttgart and Hamburg, she directed and stood on the stage, from 1919 to 1925 she was director in Dresden and Munich Schauspielhaus. Körner continued to play with Gustaf Gründgens at the Prussian State Theater in Berlin. Körner last lived in Berlin-Wilmersdorf. She was buried in the Zehlendorf cemetery.

== Selected filmography ==
- Man by the Wayside (1923)
- A Prussian Love Story (1938)
- Friedemann Bach (1941)
- The Lost Face (1948)
