= Sadja =

- Directed by: Adolf Gärtner; Erik Lund
- Written by: Karl Franke
- Produced by: Erik Lund
- Starring: Eva May; Hans Albers
- Distributed by: Ring-Film
- Release date: December 1918
- Country: Germany
- Languages: Silent; German intertitles

Sadja is a 1918 German silent film directed by Adolf Gärtner and Erik Lund and starring Eva May and Hans Albers.

== Cast ==
- Hans Albers as Älterer Gelehrter
- Helene Lanère
- Eva May as Sadja
- Heinz Stieda

== Bibliography ==
- Hans-Michael Bock and Tim Bergfelder. The Concise Cinegraph: An Encyclopedia of German Cinema. Berghahn Books.
