= The Asian Sun =

1921 film

- German: Die Sonne Asiens
- Directed by: Edmund Heuberger
- Written by: Wilhelm Roellinghoff; Norbert Ski
- Produced by: H. Kleinlein; Wilhelm Roellinghoff
- Cinematography: Otto Kanturek
- Production company: Awos-Film
- Release date: 11 March 1921
- Country: Germany
- Languages: Silent; German intertitles

The Asian Sun (German: Die Sonne Asiens) is a 1921 German silent film directed by Edmund Heuberger and starring Henry Sze, Paul Otto and Irena Marga.

== Cast ==
- Henry Sze as Kuen-Li
- Paul Otto as Head of the prison
- Irena Marga as white girl
- Victor Varconi as secretary
- Aruth Wartan
- Colette Corder as daughter of the Head of the prison
- Vladimir Agayev
- Ilja Dubrowski
- Nien Soen Ling
- Curth Muth
