= The Secrets of Berlin =

1921 film

- Directed by: Arthur Teuber (Part I); Max Mack (Part II – Part IV)
- Written by: Edmund Edel; Hanns Heinz Ewers; Artur Landsberger
- Starring: Evi Eva; Dora Bergner; Carl Geppert
- Cinematography: Willy Großstück; Otto Kanturek
- Production company: Esha-Film
- Distributed by: Monopolfilm-Vertriebs
- Release dates: 14 November 1921 (Part I); 30 November 1921 (Part II); 6 December 1921 (Part III); 18 January 1922 (Part IV)
- Country: Germany
- Languages: Silent; German intertitles

The Secrets of Berlin (German: Die Geheimnisse von Berlin) is a 1921 German silent film directed by Arthur Teuber and starring Evi Eva, Dora Bergner and Carl Geppert. It was released in four parts.

The film's sets were designed by the art director Willi A. Herrmann.

== Cast ==
- Evi Eva as Die "blonde Else"
- Dora Bergner as Fürstin Steinegg
- Grete Berger
- Lilly Eisenlohr
- Carl Geppert
- Max Grünberg
- Willy Kaiser-Heyl
- Hellmut Kraus
- Josef Rehberger

== Bibliography ==
- Rainey, Buck. Serials and Series: A World Filmography, 1912–1956. McFarland, 2015.
