= The Secret Agent (1924 film) =

1924 film

- Theatrical film poster
- German: Der geheime Agent
- Directed by: Erich Schönfelder
- Written by: Willy Haas; Adolf Lantz; Arthur Rosen
- Produced by: Joe May
- Starring: Eva May; Lucie Höflich; Carl Lamac
- Cinematography: Frederik Fuglsang
- Production company: May-Film
- Distributed by: National Film
- Release date: 26 June 1924
- Country: Germany
- Languages: Silent; German intertitles

The Secret Agent (German: Der geheime Agent) is a 1924 German silent film directed by Erich Schönfelder and starring Eva May, Lucie Höflich and Carl Lamac. It was shot at the Weissensee Studios in Berlin. The film's art direction was by Erich Zander.

== Cast ==
- Eva May as Duchess
- Lucie Höflich as Duchess's mother
- Carl Lamac as Duke
- Max Gülstorff as minister
- Ernst Behmer as minister
- Leonhard Haskel as minister
- Eugen Rex as servant
- Karl Platen as builder
- Karl Beckersachs as Marquis
- Trude Berliner as Zofe
