= The Love of the Bajadere =

1926 film directed by Géza von Bolváry

- Directed by: Géza von Bolváry
- Written by: Karl Bolwag
- Produced by: Benzion Fett
- Starring: Helene von Bolváry
- Cinematography: Hans Karl Gottschalk; Artur von Schwertführer
- Music by: Felix Bartsch
- Production company: Central-Film Fett
- Distributed by: UFA
- Release date: 1 November 1926
- Country: Germany
- Languages: Silent; German intertitles

The Love of the Bajadere (German: Die Liebe der Bajadere) is a 1926 German silent film directed by Géza von Bolváry and starring Helene von Bolváry.

== Cast ==
- Karl Falkenberg as Oberpriester der Thugs
- Claire Kronburger as Mabel Clifford
- Ellen Kürti as Naja
- Julius Messaros as Jack Ribber
- Ernst Udet
- Carl von Barany as William Hold
- Helene von Bolváry as Lady Clifford
- Otto Welte as Patrick Blum
- Max Weydner as Priester der Thugs

== Bibliography ==
- Bock, Hans-Michael; Bergfelder, Tim, eds. (2009). The Concise Cinegraph: Encyclopaedia of German Cinema. New York: Berghahn Books. ISBN 978-1-57181-655-9.
