= The Men of Frau Clarissa =

1922 film

- Directed by: Fred Sauer
- Written by: Walter Wassermann
- Starring: Oskar Marion; Hilde Wolter; Colette Corder
- Cinematography: Hans Mönling
- Production company: Orplid-Film
- Release date: 29 March 1922
- Country: Germany
- Languages: Silent; German intertitles

The Men of Frau Clarissa (German: Die Männer der Frau Clarissa) is a 1922 German silent film directed by Fred Sauer and starring Oskar Marion, Hilde Wolter and Colette Corder.

The film's sets were designed by the art director Franz Schroedter.

== Cast ==
- Oskar Marion as Legationsrat Dr. Steeven
- Hilde Wolter as Clarissa, seine Frau
- Rolf Prasch as Renesos, Attaché
- Colette Corder as Seine Freu
- Max Ruhbeck as Graf Beauchamps
- Carl Wilhelm Tetting as Kommissar
- Hugo Fischer-Köppe as Bobby Watson
- Alfred Schmasow as Kriminalbeamter
- Editha Seidel as Henny Meaton
