= Reluctant Imposter =

1925 film directed by Géza von Bolváry

- German: Hochstapler wider Willen
- Directed by: Géza von Bolváry
- Written by: Robert Liebmann
- Cinematography: Ewald Daub; Franz Seyr
- Production company: Bavaria Film
- Distributed by: Bavaria Film
- Release date: 27 February 1925
- Country: Germany
- Languages: Silent; German intertitles

Reluctant Imposter (German: Hochstapler wider Willen) is a 1925 German silent film directed by Géza von Bolváry.

It was made at the Bavaria Studios in Munich.

== Cast ==
- Vladimir Gajdarov
- Olga Gzovskaya
- Ellen Kürti
- Ferdinand Martini
- Toni Tetzlaff
