= Pathways of Life (1918 film) =

Pathways of Life (1918)
- Directed by: Ernst Sachs
- Screenplay by: Ernst Sachs
- Produced by: Max Nivelli
- Starring: Max Nivelli; Paula Barra; Lina Salten; Ernst Sachs
- Music by: Bertrand Sänger
- Production company: Nivelli-Film-Fabrikation
- Release date: 1918
- Country: Germany
- Language: Silent

Pathways of Life (German: Lebensbahnen) is a 1918 German silent film in 5 acts directed by Ernst Sachs. The film tells the story of an opera singer who rises to stardom with tragic consequences. The film is the first one produced by Max Nivelli. Nivellia and the film received favorable reviews. He also acted in the lead role and sang in various screenings. The music score was composed by Bertrand Sänger with the theme song Dreams of Happiness (German: Träumen vom Glück).

== Cast ==
- Max Nivelli
- Paula Barra
- Lina Salten
- Ernst Sachs
