= His Excellency from Madagascar =

1922 film

- German: Seine Exzellenz von Madagaskar
- Directed by: Georg Jacoby
- Written by: Georg Jacoby; Robert Liebmann
- Produced by: Paul Davidson
- Starring: Paul Otto; Eva May; Georg Alexander
- Cinematography: Frederik Fuglsang
- Production company: PAGU
- Distributed by: UFA
- Release dates: 6 January 1922 (Part I); 19 January 1922 (Part II)
- Country: Germany
- Languages: Silent; German intertitles

His Excellency from Madagascar (German: Seine Exzellenz von Madagaskar) is a 1922 German silent thriller film directed by Georg Jacoby and starring Paul Otto, Eva May, and Georg Alexander. It was released in two parts Das Mädchen aus der Fremde and Stubbs, der Detektiv.

The film's sets were designed by the art director Robert Neppach.

== Cast ==
- Paul Otto
- Eva May
- Georg Alexander
- Alfred Gerasch
- Julius Falkenstein
- Sophie Pagay
- Johanna Ewald
- Paul Biensfeldt
- Ellen Plessow
- Henry Bender
- Emil Rameau
- Charles Puffy
