= The Hustler (1920 film) =

1920 film directed by Emil Justitz

- Directed by: Emil Justitz
- Written by: Leo Heller; Rudolf Strauß
- Produced by: Emil Justitz
- Starring: Anita Berber; Hans Albers
- Cinematography: Károly Vass
- Production company: Justiz-Film
- Release date: 13 December 1920
- Country: Germany
- Languages: Silent; German intertitles

The Hustler (German: Der Falschspieler) is a 1920 German silent film directed by Emil Justitz and starring Anita Berber and Hans Albers.

== Cast ==
In alphabetical order

- Hans Albers as Harald Petersen
- Marian Alma
- Anita Berber as Tänzerin Asta
- Ilse Götzen
- Emil Mamelok as Falschspieler
- Elisit Mörtstedt
- Hans Mühlhofer
- Max Neumann as Provinzler
- Preben J. Rist
- Carl Wilhelm Tetting
- Anna von Palen as Mutter

== Bibliography ==
- Rolf Giesen. The Nosferatu Story: The Seminal Horror Film, Its Predecessors and Its Enduring Legacy. McFarland, 2019.
