= The Marriage Swindler (1925 film) =

1925 film directed by Carl Boese

- Directed by: Carl Boese
- Written by: Viktor Klein; Reinhold Schünzel
- Produced by: Viktor Klein
- Starring: Reinhold Schünzel; Käthe Haack; Evi Eva
- Cinematography: Mutz Greenbaum
- Music by: Bruno Schulz
- Production company: Hofbauer und Klein
- Distributed by: Dewesti-Verleih
- Release date: 3 March 1925
- Running time: 83 minutes
- Country: Germany
- Languages: Silent; German intertitles

The Marriage Swindler (German: Heiratsschwindler) is a 1925 German silent drama film directed by Carl Boese and starring Reinhold Schünzel, Käthe Haack and Evi Eva. The film's sets were designed by the art director Kurt Richter.

== Cast ==
In alphabetical order

- Uschi Elleot
- Adolphe Engers
- Evi Eva
- Erika Glässner
- Käthe Haack
- Margarete Kupfer
- Erna Morena
- Reinhold Schünzel
- Rosa Valetti

== Bibliography ==
- Grange, William. Cultural Chronicle of the Weimar Republic. Scarecrow Press, 2008.
