= The Girl of the Golden West (1922 film) =

1922 film

- Directed by: Hans Werckmeister
- Written by: Hans Werckmeister
- Based on: Das Mädchen mit dem Goldhelm; 1918 novel by Hugo Landsberger
- Starring: Georg Alexander; Franz Biehler
- Cinematography: Conrad Wienecke
- Production company: Deulig
- Release date: 26 May 1922
- Country: Germany
- Languages: Silent; German intertitles

The Girl of the Golden West (German:Das Mädchen aus dem goldenen Westen) is a 1922 German silent film directed by Hans Werckmeister.

== Cast ==
- Georg Alexander as Adliger Tunichtgut
- Franz Biehler
- Karen Brand
- Hans Land as Notar
- Renée Pelar
- Heinrich Römer
- Carl Wilhelm Tetting
- Maria Zelenka

== Bibliography ==
- Dietrich Scheunemann. Expressionist Film: New Perspectives. Camden House, 2006.
