= The Strumpet's Plaything =

1922 film

- Directed by: Eugen Illés
- Written by: Hermann Fellner; Margarete Lindau-Schulz; Helmuth Orthmann
- Starring: Colette Corder; Heinrich Schroth; Eduard von Winterstein
- Cinematography: Hans Blech
- Production company: Orbis-Film
- Release date: 21 August 1922
- Country: Germany
- Languages: Silent; German intertitles

The Strumpet's Plaything (German: Das Spielzeug einer Dirne) is a 1922 German silent drama film directed by Eugen Illés and starring Colette Corder, Heinrich Schroth and Eduard von Winterstein.

The film's sets were designed by the art director Siegfried Wroblewsky.

== Cast ==
- Colette Corder
- Inge Helgard
- Rolf Lindau
- Heinrich Schroth
- Eduard von Winterstein

== Bibliography ==
- Grange, William. Cultural Chronicle of the Weimar Republic. Scarecrow Press, 2008.
