= The Gallows Bride =

1924 film

- Directed by: Josef Berger
- Written by: Hermanna Barkhausen
- Cinematography: Franz Weihmayr
- Production company: Union-Film
- Distributed by: Bavaria Film
- Release date: 13 November 1924
- Country: Germany
- Languages: Silent; German intertitles

The Gallows Bride (German:Die Galgenbraut) is a 1924 German silent film directed by Josef Berger.

== Cast ==
In alphabetical order

- Carla Ferra
- Hans Lutterbeck
- Georg Margo
- Grete Reinwald
- Ernst Schrumpf
- Wilhelm Stauffen
- Leopold von Ledebur
