= Assassination (1927 film) =

1927 film directed by Richard Oswald

- Directed by: Richard Oswald
- Written by: Vicki Baum (novel); Herbert Juttke; Georg C. Klaren
- Produced by: Richard Oswald
- Starring: Eduard Rothauser; Mathilde Sussin; Hans Stüwe; Grete Mosheim
- Cinematography: Ewald Daub
- Music by: Walter Ulfig
- Production company: Richard-Oswald-Produktion
- Distributed by: Matador-Film
- Release date: 23 August 1927
- Running time: 70 minutes
- Country: Germany
- Languages: Silent; German intertitles

Assassination (German: Feme) is a 1927 German silent thriller film directed by Richard Oswald and starring Eduard Rothauser, Mathilde Sussin and Hans Stüwe. It was adapted from a novel by Vicki Baum. It was shot at the EFA Studios in Berlin. The film's art direction was by Gustav A. Knauer.

== Cast ==
- Eduard Rothauser as Geheimrat Burthe
- Mathilde Sussin as Frau Burthe
- Hans Stüwe as Joachim Burthe
- Grete Mosheim as Charlotte Burthe
- Rudolf Forster as Gregor von Askanius
- Friedrich Kayßler as Minister
- Adele Sandrock as Mutter
- Ellen Kürti as Jelena Maikova
- Bernhard Goetzke as Professor Lenzberg
- Carl Walther Meyer as Assistenzarzt
- Grete Reinwald as Tochter des Gärtners
- Mathias Wieman as Irrsinniger
- Paul Henckels as Kreisarzt
- Irma Green as Dirne
- Henry Bender as Schliepke
- Ida Wüst as Frau Schliepke
- Gustav Trautschold
- Kurt Gerron

== Bibliography ==
- Hake, Sabine (2013) [2002]. German National Cinema (2nd ed.). Routledge. ISBN 978-1-136-02054-4.
- Weniger, Kay (2011). "Es wird im Leben dir mehr genommen als gegeben...": Lexikon der aus Deutschland und Österreich emigrierten Filmschaffenden 1933 bis 1945. Berlin: Acabus. ISBN 978-3-86282-049-8.
