= Georg Henrich =

German actor (1878–1934)

- Born: 9 September 1878; Mainz, Grand Duchy of Hesse and by Rhine, German Empire
- Died: 30 March 1934 (aged 55); Bavaria, Germany
- Occupation: Actor
- Years active: 1921–1934 (film)

Georg Henrich (9 September 1878 – 30 March 1934) was a German stage and film actor.

== Selected filmography ==
- The Fountain of Madness (1921)
- The Way to the Light (1923)
- Girls You Don't Marry (1924)
- The Shot in the Pavilion (1925)
- Women Who Fall by the Wayside (1925)
- Behind Monastery Walls (1928)
- Love on Skis (1928)
- Waterloo (1929)
- When the White Lilacs Bloom Again (1929)
- Brother Bernhard (1929)
- A Man with Heart (1932)
- Cruiser Emden (1932)
- The Tunnel (1933)
- Must We Get Divorced? (1933)

== Bibliography ==
- Grange, William. Cultural Chronicle of the Weimar Republic. Scarecrow Press, 2008.
