= Hands Up (1921 film) =

1921 film

- Directed by: Wolfgang Neff
- Written by: Jane Bess
- Produced by: Liddy Hegewald
- Production company: Hegewald Film
- Distributed by: Hegewald Film
- Release date: 30 July 1921
- Country: Germany
- Languages: Silent; German intertitles

Hands Up (German: Hände hoch) is a 1921 German silent film directed by Wolfgang Neff.

== Cast ==
In alphabetical order

- Colette Corder as Harriet
- Fritz Falkenberg as Graf Perucci
- Sadjah Gezza as Peggy
- Marga Köhler
- Kurt Middendorf
- Max Mothes as Mr. Ward
- Ludwig Rex
- Eduard van Meghen as Kennam
