= When the White Lilacs Bloom Again =

When the White Lilacs Bloom Again (German: Wenn der weiße Flieder wieder blüht) may refer to:

- A popular German song of the 1920s
- When the White Lilacs Bloom Again (1929 film), a German silent film directed by Robert Wohlmuth
- When the White Lilacs Bloom Again (1953 film), a West German film directed by Hans Deppe
