= The Red Poster =

1920 film directed by Emil Justitz

- Directed by: Emil Justitz
- Written by: Leo Heller; Rudolf Strauß
- Produced by: Emil Justitz
- Cinematography: Arpad Viragh
- Production company: Emil Justiz Productions
- Distributed by: Bengen-Film Verlag
- Release date: 21 May 1920
- Country: Germany
- Languages: Silent; German intertitles

The Red Poster (German: Das rote Plakat) is a 1920 German silent crime film directed by Emil Justitz.

== Cast ==
In alphabetical order

- Claire Creutz
- Emmy Denner as Gräfin Rhoden
- André Haase as André Delmont
- Ernst Hofmann as Blasser Kavalier
- Tatjana Irrah as Marion Diabelli
- Hans Lanser-Ludolff as Kripo
- Georg Leux
- Adolf E. Licho as Emil Storch
- Oskar Linke
- Kurt Middendorf as Baron Dürenstein
- Ida Perry as Frau Bauer
- Georg H. Schnell as Kommissar Herder
- Carl Wilhelm Tetting
- Herr Wettmann
- Heinrich Wild

== Bibliography ==
- Rolf Giesen. The Nosferatu Story: The Seminal Horror Film, Its Predecessors and Its Enduring Legacy. McFarland, 2019.
