= At the Edge of the Great City =

1922 film

- Directed by: Hanns Kobe
- Written by: Hanns Kobe; Paul Reno
- Based on: Die Mausefalle (novel) by Erna Weißenborn
- Starring: Evi Eva; Fritz Kortner; Rudolf Forster
- Cinematography: Marius Holdt
- Production company: Ungo-Film
- Release date: 2 December 1922
- Country: Germany
- Languages: Silent; German intertitles

At the Edge of the Great City (German: Am Rande der Großstadt) is a 1922 German silent film directed by Hanns Kobe and starring Evi Eva, Fritz Kortner and Rudolf Forster.

The film's sets were designed by the art director Robert A. Dietrich.

== Cast ==
- Evi Eva
- Fritz Kortner
- Rudolf Forster
- Grete Diercks
- Georg August Koch
- Ernst Rotmund
- Emilia Unda
- Hertha von Walther
- Maria West
- Yuri Yurovsky

== Bibliography ==
- Grange, William (2008). Cultural Chronicle of the Weimar Republic. Lanham, MD: Scarecrow Press. ISBN 978-0-8108-5967-8.
