= Miss Rockefeller Is Filming =

1922 film directed by Erich Schönfelder

- German: Miss Rockefeller filmt
- Directed by: Erich Schönfelder
- Written by: Gustav Hochstetter
- Produced by: Arthur Wellin
- Starring: Paul Otto; Stella Arbenina; Georg Alexander
- Cinematography: Hans Bloch
- Production company: Landlicht-Filmverleih
- Distributed by: Landlicht-Filmverleih
- Release date: 2 November 1922
- Country: Germany
- Languages: Silent; German intertitles

Miss Rockefeller Is Filming (German: Miss Rockefeller filmt) is a 1922 German silent comedy film directed by Erich Schönfelder and starring Paul Otto, Stella Arbenina and Georg Alexander.

The film's sets were designed by the art director Rudi Feld.

== Cast ==
- Paul Otto as Dr. Arne Larsen
- Stella Arbenina as Sigrid
- Georg Alexander as Dr. Einar Osten
- Hermann Picha as Nielson, Film director
- Albert Paulig as Count Rosencrantz
- Henry Bender as Dr. Kokolores
- Hans Junkermann as Marquis Vidal
- Charlotte Kinder as Liane Laroche, eine Frau, new employee
- Grete Lundt as Nuja-Naja, Film diva
- A. Oberg as Mister Rockefeller
