= Gobseck (film) =

1924 film

- Directed by: Preben J. Rist
- Written by: Honoré de Balzac (novella Gobseck); Lothar Knud Frederik
- Starring: Otto Gebühr; Clementine Plessner
- Cinematography: Leopold Kutzleb
- Production company: Suprema-Film
- Release date: 25 April 1924
- Country: Germany
- Languages: Silent; German intertitles

Gobseck is a 1924 German silent drama film directed by Preben J. Rist and starring Otto Gebühr and Clementine Plessner.

== Cast ==
In alphabetical order

- Henry Bender as Simons - Bankdirektor
- Rolf Brunner as Dr. Bergner
- Eugen Burg as Graf Otto Hohnthal
- Gertrud de Lalsky as Paronon Plessnitz
- Evi Eva as Gerda
- Otto Gebühr as Jean Esther von Gobseck
- Ernst Hofmann as Horst
- Lissi Lind as Hermine
- Emil Mamelok as Frh. v. Landes
- Hermann Picha as Bürovorsteher
- Clementine Plessner as seine Wirtschafterin

== Bibliography ==
- Grange, William. Cultural Chronicle of the Weimar Republic. Scarecrow Press, 2008.
