= The Fountain of Madness =

1921 film

- Directed by: Ottmar Ostermayr
- Written by: Alfred Schirokauer
- Produced by: Peter Ostermayr
- Starring: Georg Henrich; Sadjah Gezza; Genée Schindler
- Cinematography: Franz Planer; Gustav Weiß
- Production company: Münchner Lichtspielkunst
- Distributed by: Bavaria Film
- Release date: 10 February 1921
- Country: Germany
- Languages: Silent; German intertitles

The Fountain of Madness (German: Der Brunnen des Wahnsinns) is a 1921 German silent film directed by Ottmar Ostermayr and starring Georg Henrich, Sadjah Gezza and Genée Schindler.

It was shot at the Emelka Studios in Munich. The film's sets were designed by the art director Carl Ludwig Kirmse.

== Cast ==
- Georg Henrich as Adoo - Kunstsammler
- Sadjah Gezza as Beari - Oberpriesterin
- Genée Schindler as Bearis Lieblingspriesterin
- Carl Dalmonico as Oberpriester
- Carl Sickas Bildhauer

== Bibliography ==
- Bock, Hans-Michael & Bergfelder, Tim. The Concise CineGraph. Encyclopedia of German Cinema. Berghahn Books, 2009.
- Sylvia Wolf, Ulrich Kurowski, Eberhard Hauff. Das Münchener Film und Kino Buch. Edition Achteinhalb Lothar Just, 1988.
