= Martyr of His Heart =

1918 film directed by Emil Justitz

- Directed by: Emil Justitz
- Written by: Emil Kolberg; Emil Justitz; Fritz Kortner
- Produced by: Alexander Kolowrat; Oskar Messter; Arnold Pressburger
- Starring: Fritz Kortner; Marion Illing; Anton Pointner
- Music by: Björn Maseng
- Production company: Sascha-Messter-Film
- Release date: 8 February 1918
- Running time: 85 minutes
- Country: Austro-Hungarian Empire
- Languages: Silent; German intertitles

Martyr of His Heart (German: Der Märtyrer seines Herzens) is a 1918 Austrian silent historical film directed by Emil Justitz and starring Fritz Kortner, Marion Illing and Anton Pointner. It is a biopic of the composer Ludwig van Beethoven.

== Cast ==
- Fritz Kortner as Ludwig van Beethoven
- Marion Illing
- Anton Pointner
- Else Heller
- Nelly Hochwald as Giulietta Guicciardi

== Bibliography ==
- Robert Von Dassanowsky. Austrian Cinema: A History. McFarland, 2005.
