= Rudi Feld =

German art director and set designer

- Born: 22 December 1896; Berlin, German Empire
- Died: 25 March 1994 (aged 97); Santa Monica, California; United States
- Occupation: Art director
- Years active: 1920–1969 (film)
- Relatives: Fritz Feld (brother)

Rudi Feld (1896–1994) was a German art director and set designer who worked for many years in the United States.

== Germany ==
Feld was born Rudi Feilchenfeld in Berlin, the elder brother of the actor Fritz Feld. He served in the German army during World War I and then began his early career designing posters for revue and cabaret shows, before graduating to creating film sets. Feld worked in the German film industry during the boom years of the late silent era. He was employed by German major studio UFA as head of advertising. He designed the exterior displays of the flagship UFA cinema Ufa-Palast am Zoo for each new premiere.

== Exile ==
Following the Nazi rise to power in 1933, the Jewish Feld went into exile. Feld settled in Mandatory Palestine, where he briefly owned a nightclub. In 1937, he emigrated to the United States, and from the mid-1940s, he found regular work in the American film industry. Feld was frequently employed by smaller Hollywood studios such as Eagle-Lion during the post-World War II years, and worked as a draftsman for MGM. He continued working until 1969.

== Partial filmography ==
- Miss Rockefeller Is Filming (1922)
- William Tell (1923)
- King of Women (1923)
- Leap Into Life (1924)
- The Adventure of Mr. Philip Collins (1925)
- Express Train of Love (1925)
- The Wooing of Eve (1926)
- The Armoured Vault (1926)
- Summer Storm (1944)
- Voice in the Wind (1944)
- The Captain from Köpenick (completed in 1941, released in 1945)
- Whistle Stop (1946)
- New Orleans (1947)
- Adventures of Gallant Bess (1948)
- The Argyle Secrets (1948)
- The Vicious Circle (1948)
- My Dear Secretary (1948)
- Parole, Inc. (1948)
- Impact (1949)
- Guilty of Treason (1950)
- Death of a Scoundrel (1956)
- Hellcats of the Navy (1957)
- Escape from Red Rock (1957)
- Operation Eichmann (1961)
- The Gun Hawk (1963)

== Bibliography ==
- Prawer, S.S. Between Two Worlds: The Jewish Presence in German and Austrian Film, 1910–1933. Berghahn Books, 2005.
- Ward, Janet. Weimar Surfaces: Urban Visual Culture in 1920s Germany. University of California Press, 2001.
