= Slaves of Love =

1924 film directed by Carl Boese

- German: Sklaven der Liebe
- Directed by: Carl Boese
- Written by: Carl Boese; Margarete-Maria Langen
- Based on: Die Hochzeit von Valeni (play) by Marco Brociner and Ludwig Ganghofer
- Starring: Ellen Kürti; Cläre Lotto; Olga Engl
- Cinematography: Hans Karl Gottschalk; Franz Seyr
- Production company: Bavaria Film
- Distributed by: Bavaria Film
- Release date: 5 September 1924
- Country: Germany
- Languages: Silent; German intertitles

Slaves of Love (German: Sklaven der Liebe) is a 1924 German silent drama film directed by Carl Boese and starring Ellen Kürti, Cläre Lotto, and Olga Engl.

The film's sets were designed by the art director Peter Rochelsberg and Otto Völckers. It was shot at the Emelka Studios in Munich.

== Cast ==
- Ellen Kürti
- Cläre Lotto
- Olga Engl
- Clementine Plessner
- Charles Willy Kayser
- Albert Steinrück
- Karl Falkenberg
- Leopold von Ledebur
- Emil Höfer
- Ludwig Rex
- Julius Stettner

== See also ==
- The Wedding of Valeni (1914)
