= The Air Pirates (film) =

1920 film directed by Harry Piel

- Directed by: Harry Piel
- Written by: Max Bauer; Harry Piel
- Produced by: Harry Piel
- Starring: Harry Piel
- Cinematography: Gustave Preiss
- Production company: Metro Film GmbH
- Release date: 16 July 1920
- Country: Germany
- Languages: Silent; German intertitles

The Air Pirates (German: Die Luftpiraten) is a 1920 German silent adventure film directed by and starring Harry Piel.

The film's sets were designed by the art director Albert Korell.

== Cast ==
- Harry Piel
- Paula Barra
- Friedrich Berger
- Albert Collani
- Paula Cora
- Mary Marion
- Margot Thisset

== Plot ==
The eponymous air pirates are criminals who use a veritable airship to ascend to their well-off victims in a hotel high up in the mountains in order to rob them. Alas, Harry Peel neutralizes the crooks despite their highly modern equipment.

== Bibliography ==
- Grange, William (2008). Cultural Chronicle of the Weimar Republic. Lanham, MD: Scarecrow Press. ISBN 978-0-8108-5967-8.
