= The Eyes as the Accuser =

1920 film

The Eyes as the Acusser
- Directed by: Fritz Bernhardt
- Written by: Ernst Kleber; E.F. Malkowsky; Helmuth Orthmann
- Starring: Evi Eva; Heinrich Schroth; Bernhard Goetzke
- Cinematography: Joe Rive
- Production company: Esha-Film
- Distributed by: Martin Dentler
- Release date: 11 June 1920
- Country: Germany
- Languages: Silent; German intertitles

The Eyes as the Accuser (German: Die Augen als Ankläger) is a 1920 German crime film directed by Fritz Bernhardt and starring Evi Eva, Heinrich Schroth and Bernhard Goetzke.

The film's sets were designed by the art director Siegfried Wroblewsky.

== Cast ==
- Evi Eva as Detektivin Evi Gardener
- Heinrich Schroth as Detektiv Bill Roid
- Bernhard Goetzke
- Ludwig Rex
- Paul Donner as Polizeikommissar
- Preben J. Rist as Professor für Chemie Rott
- Ernst Rückert as Fabrikant Paul Ramond
- Eddie Seefeld
- Maat St. Clair

== Bibliography ==
- Grange, William. Cultural Chronicle of the Weimar Republic. Scarecrow Press, 2008.
