= The Black Guest =

1920 film

- Directed by: Wolfgang Neff
- Written by: Jane Bess
- Produced by: Liddy Hegewald
- Cinematography: Herrmann Saalfrank
- Production company: Hegewald Film
- Release date: 1920
- Country: Germany
- Languages: Silent; German intertitles

The Black Guest (German: Der schwarze Gast) is a 1920 German silent film directed by Wolfgang Neff.

The film's art direction was by Franz Schroedter.

== Cast ==
In alphabetical order

- Fritz Beckmann
- Curt Cappi
- Colette Corder
- Julius Falkenstein
- Rita Parsen
- Ludwig Rex
- Alfred Schmasow
- Ludwig Trautmann
