= Girls You Don't Marry =

1924 film directed by Géza von Bolváry

- Directed by: Géza von Bolváry
- Written by: Margarete-Maria Langen
- Starring: Ellen Kürti; Karl Beckersachs; Paul Otto
- Cinematography: Ewald Daub
- Music by: Bruno Schulz
- Production company: Filmhaus Bavaria
- Distributed by: Bavaria Film
- Release date: 10 October 1924
- Country: Germany
- Languages: Silent; German intertitles

Girls You Don't Marry (German: Mädchen, die man nicht heiratet) is a 1924 German silent comedy film directed by Géza von Bolváry and starring Ellen Kürti, Karl Beckersachs, and Paul Otto.

It was shot at the Bavaria Studios in Munich. The film's sets were designed by the art director Otto Völckers.

== Cast ==
- Ellen Kürti as Das Mädchen, das man nicht heiratet
- Karl Beckersachs as Der Ladenprinz
- Hans Mierendorff as Er
- Paul Otto as Der Schiebergraf
- Henri Peters-Arnolds as Der junge Mann aus guter Familie
- Ernestine Costa
- Ellen Heel
- Georg Henrich
- Grete Hollmann
- Margarete Kupfer
- Fred Köster
- Walter Lantzsch
- Clementine Plessner
- Albert Steinrück
- Helene von Bolváry
- Otto Wernicke
- August Wisbeck

== Bibliography ==
- Grange, William (2008). Cultural Chronicle of the Weimar Republic. Lanham, MD: Scarecrow Press. ISBN 978-0-8108-5967-8.
