= I Stand in the Dark Midnight =

1927 film

- German: Steh' ich in finstrer Mitternacht
- Directed by: Max Mack
- Written by: Marie Luise Droop; Charlie Roellinghoff
- Starring: Grete Reinwald; Gerd Briese; Helene von Bolváry
- Cinematography: Willy Großstück
- Production company: Albö-Film
- Distributed by: Albö-Film
- Release date: November 1927
- Country: Germany
- Languages: Silent; German intertitles

I Stand in the Dark Midnight (German: Steh' ich in finstrer Mitternacht) is a 1927 German silent film directed by Max Mack and starring Grete Reinwald, Gerd Briese, and Helene von Bolváry.

The film's sets were designed by the art director Kurt Richter.

== Cast ==
- Grete Reinwald as Liesl
- Gerd Briese as Rudloff
- Georg Burghardt as Pastor
- Hugo Fischer-Köppe as Junge
- Gisela Günther as Bertha
- Karl Harbacher as Gottfried Heidepriem
- Paul Morgan as Meier
- Leo Peukert as Holst
- Ernst Pröckl as Franz
- Gustav Püttjer
- Ernst Rückert as Willi
- Helene von Bolváry as Stine
- Luise Werckmeister as Pfarrerin
