= Clementine Plessner =

Austrian actress

- Born: Clementine Folkmann; 7 December 1855; Vienna, Austro-Hungarian Empire
- Died: 27 February 1943 (aged 87); Theresienstadt concentration camp, Czechoslovakia
- Years active: 1918–1932

Clementine Plessner (7 December 1855 – 27 February 1943) was an Austrian stage and film actress. Plessner worked in the German film industry and appeared in over sixty films, mostly during the silent era. Plessner featured in Richard Oswald's enlightenment film Different from the Others and F.W. Murnau's Journey into the Night.

Following the Nazi rise to power, the Jewish actress left Germany for neighbouring Austria. Later, after the Anchluss, she was arrested by the Nazi authorities and died in Theresienstadt concentration camp.

== Selected filmography ==
- Diary of a Lost Woman (1918)
- The Story of Dida Ibsen (1918)
- The Sign of Guilt (1918)
- Henriette Jacoby (1918)
- Different from the Others (1919)
- Nocturne of Love (1919)
- The Tragedy of a Great (1920)
- Humanity Unleashed (1920)
- Lady Hamilton (1921)
- Journey into the Night (1921)
- The Shadow of Gaby Leed (1921)
- The Circle of Death (1922)
- Bigamy (1922)
- Lucrezia Borgia (1922)
- Hallig Hooge (1923)
- Taras Bulba (1924)
- Gobseck (1924)
- Girls You Don't Marry (1924)
- Slaves of Love (1924)
- The Voice of the Heart (1924)
- Two Children (1924)
- The Circus Princess (1925)
- The Iron Bride (1925)
- Oh Those Glorious Old Student Days (1925)
- The Clever Fox (1926)
- Superfluous People (1926)
- The Bank Crash of Unter den Linden (1926)
- Only a Dancing Girl (1926)
- Mademoiselle Josette, My Woman (1926)
- The Eleven Schill Officers (1926)
- The Captain from Koepenick (1926)
- The Right to Live (1927)
- The White Sonata (1928)
- The Missing Wife (1929)
- Der Monte Christo von Prag (1929)
- Devotion (1929)

== Bibliography ==
- Eisner, Lotte H. F. W. Murnau. University of California Press, 1973.
- Prawer, S.S. Between Two Worlds: The Jewish Presence in German and Austrian Film, 1910–1933. Berghahn Books, 2005.
