= Carl Wilhelm Tetting =

German actor

- Born: 11 May 1896; Berlin, German Empire
- Died: 20 June 1966 (aged 70); Munich, Bavaria, West Germany
- Other name: C.W. Tetting
- Occupations: Actor, producer
- Years active: 1920–1958 (film)

Carl Wilhelm Tetting (1896 – 1966) was a German actor and film producer. He was occasionally credited as C.W. Tetting.

== Selected filmography ==
=== Actor ===
- The Hustler (1920)
- The Red Poster (1920)
- The Girl of the Golden West (1922)
- The Men of Frau Clarissa (1922)
- The Shadows of That Night (1922)
- Time Is Money (1923)
- Nanon (1924)
- The White Geisha (1926)
- The Judas of Tyrol (1933)
- A Woman Who Knows What She Wants (1934)
- Hundred Days (1935)

=== Producer ===
- Water for Canitoga (1939)
- A Woman Like You (1939)
- Enemies (1940)
- A German Robinson Crusoe (1940)
- Carl Peters (1941)
- Secret File W.B.1 (1942)
- Dr. Holl (1951)
- The Great Temptation (1952)
- Arlette Conquers Paris (1953)
- The Eternal Waltz (1954)
- André and Ursula (1955)
- San Salvatore (1956)
- Die ganze Welt singt nur Amore (1956)
- An American in Salzburg (1958)

== Bibliography ==
- Kreimeier, Klaus. The Ufa Story: A History of Germany's Greatest Film Company, 1918–1945. University of California Press, 1999.
