= Humanity Unleashed =

1920 film directed by Joseph Delmont

- Directed by: Joseph Delmont
- Written by: Max Glass
- Produced by: Max Nivelli
- Starring: Eugen Klöpfer; Paul Hartmann; Carl de Vogt
- Cinematography: Gustave Preiss; Emil Schünemann
- Production company: Nivo-Film
- Release date: 19 November 1920
- Country: Germany
- Languages: Silent; German intertitles

Humanity Unleashed (German: Die entfesselte Menschheit) is a 1920 German silent drama film directed by Joseph Delmont and starring Eugen Klöpfer, Paul Hartmann and Carl de Vogt. The film portrays a violent leftist attempt to seize power. However, its location shooting in the streets of Berlin coincided with the rightist Kapp Putsch.

The film's sets were designed by the art director Willi Herrmann.

== Cast ==
- Eugen Klöpfer as Karenow, Russian agitator
- Paul Hartmann as Michael Klarenbach, engineer & director of chemical factory
- Gertrude (Trude) Hoffman as Rita, Clarenbach’s wife
- Carl de Vogt as Winterstein, former officer, Karenow’s supporter
- Emil Lind as Leutenholz, editor of the “Red Torch”
- Hermann Bachmann as Director Turenius, owner of ammunitions factory
- Arthur Bergen as Franziskus Turenius, his son
- Marion Illing as Camilla, Winterstein’s mistress
- Rosa Valleti as leader of the mob, prostitute
- Georg John as Fritz Breese, worker
- Clementine Plessner as hostess at Karenow's residence
- Wolfgang Heinz as Kulicke, worker
- Kurt Mikulski as Lehmann, worker
- Leo Koffler as second-hand dealer
- Hella Thornegg as 1. prostitute, part of mob
- Lydia Potokaja as 2. prostitute, part of mob
- Maria Forescu as 3. prostitute, part of mob
- Sylvia Torf as 4. prostitute, part of mob
- Alfred Fisher as foreigner
- Emil Linzen as Christof Jessen

== Bibliography ==
- Rogowski, Christian. The Many Faces of Weimar Cinema: Rediscovering Germany's Filmic Legacy. Camden House, 2010.
