= The Woman without Money =

1925 film

- Directed by: Fritz Kaufmann
- Written by: Curt J. Braun
- Starring: Grete Reinwald; Margarete Kupfer; Rosa Valetti
- Cinematography: Reimar Kuntze
- Music by: Bruno Schulz
- Production company: Transatlantische Film
- Distributed by: Deulig-Verleih
- Release date: 23 October 1925
- Country: Germany
- Languages: Silent; German intertitles

The Woman without Money (German: Die Frau ohne Geld) is a 1925 German silent film directed by Fritz Kaufmann and starring Grete Reinwald, Margarete Kupfer, and Rosa Valetti.

== Cast ==
- Grete Reinwald
- Margarete Kupfer
- Rosa Valetti
- Alfons Fryland
- Max Landa
- Kurt Vespermann
- Lissy Arna
- Olga Engl
- Blandine Ebinger

== Bibliography ==
- Grange, William (2008). Cultural Chronicle of the Weimar Republic. Lanham, MD: Scarecrow Press. ISBN 978-0-8108-5967-8.
