= The Stolen Professor =

1924 German silent film

- Directed by: Emil Justitz
- Written by: Hermann Fellner; Ernst Klein (novel); Margarete Lindau-Schulz
- Starring: Olaf Fjord; Camilla von Hollay; Kläre Grieger
- Cinematography: Friedl Behn-Grund; Erich Waschneck
- Production company: Börnstad-Justitz-Film
- Release date: 14 November 1924
- Country: Germany
- Languages: Silent; German intertitles

The Stolen Professor (German: Der gestohlene Professor) is a 1924 German silent film directed by Emil Justitz and starring Olaf Fjord, Camilla von Hollay and Kläre Grieger.

The film's sets were designed by Otto Erdmann and Hans Sohnle.

== Cast ==
- Olaf Fjord
- Camilla von Hollay
- Kläre Grieger
- Sabri Mahir
- Eugen Rex
- Frida Richard
- Karl Platen
- Otto Kronburger
- Ernst Rückert
- Hugo Flink
- Hans Junkermann
