= The Princess of the Riviera =

1926 film directed by Géza von Bolváry

- Directed by: Géza von Bolváry
- Written by: Karl Bolwag
- Cinematography: Hans Karl Gottschalk
- Production company: Ewe-Film
- Distributed by: Bayerische Film
- Release date: 8 July 1926
- Running time: 90 minutes
- Country: Germany
- Languages: Silent; German intertitles

The Princess of the Riviera (German: Die Fürstin der Riviera) is a 1926 German silent film directed by Géza von Bolváry. It was shot at the Bavaria Studios in Munich.

== Cast ==
- Hans Junkermann
- Ellen Kürti
- Julius Messaros

== Bibliography ==
- Parish, James Robert; Canham, Kingsley (1976). Film Directors Guide: Western Europe. Metuchen, NJ: Scarecrow Press. ISBN 978-0-8108-0908-6.
