= King of Women =

1923 film

- Directed by: Jaap Speyer
- Written by: Johannes Brandt
- Starring: Georg Alexander; Stella Arbenina; Ralph Arthur Roberts
- Cinematography: Marius Holdt
- Production company: Orbis-Film
- Distributed by: Orbis-Film
- Release date: 5 January 1923
- Country: Germany
- Languages: Silent; German intertitles

King of Women (German: Der Frauenkönig) is a 1923 German silent comedy film directed by Jaap Speyer and starring Georg Alexander, Stella Arbenina, and Ralph Arthur Roberts.

The film's sets were designed by the art director Rudi Feld.

== Cast ==
In alphabetical order

- Georg Alexander
- Stella Arbenina
- Margit Barnay
- Esther Carena
- Adolphe Engers
- Marija Leiko
- Mia Pankau
- Ralph Arthur Roberts

== Bibliography ==
- Krautz, Alfred (1984). International Directory of Cinematographers, Set- and Costume Designers in Film. Vol. 4. Munich: Saur. ISBN 978-3-598-21434-9.
