= Eva May =

Austrian actress (1902–1924)

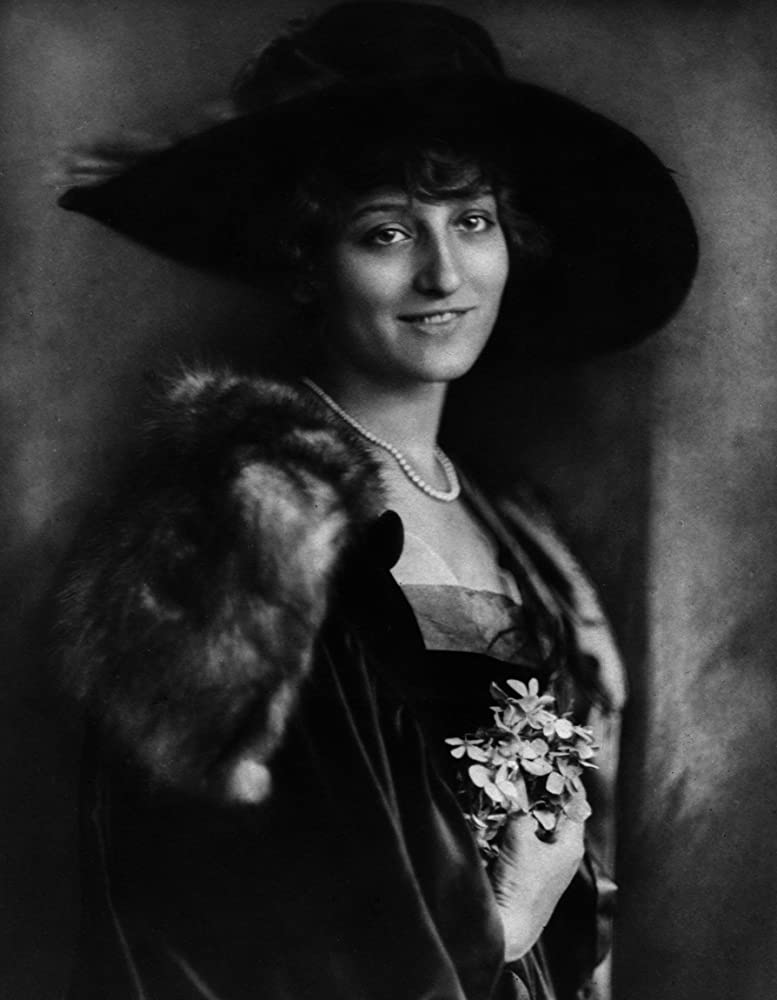
- Born: Eva Maria Mandl; 29 May 1902; Vienna, Austria-Hungary
- Died: 10 September 1924 (aged 22); Baden bei Wien, Austria
- Occupation: Actress
- Years active: 1914–1924
- Spouses: Erik Lund (m. 1918, divorced) Lothar Mendes (divorced) Manfred Noa (divorced)
- Parent(s): Joe May (father); Mia May (mother)

Eva Maria Mandl (29 May 1902 – 10 September 1924), known professionally as Eva May, was an Austrian actress, the daughter of the film director Joe May and his wife actress Mia May. In 1924, she committed suicide by gunshot.

== Biography ==
Eva Maria Mandl was born on 29 May 1902, the daughter of Mia May and the Austrian Jewish film director Joe May. Her parents had married seven weeks prior to her birth.

She took the name of Eva May and made her film debut in Die geheimnisvolle Villa (1914), which was directed by her father. From 1918 onwards she worked for the Ring-Film GmbH, managed by Manfred Liebenau, who was working as a director under the nom de plume Erik Lund. The two married when May was 16 years old. During this time, May appeared in films such as Erträumtes (1918), Sadja (1918), and The Bride of the Incapacitated (1919). Lund and May soon created their own Eva May serial, for which May wrote the scripts.

In the 1920s, May worked with her father in films such as The Legend of Holy Simplicity (1920) and Junge Mama (1921). Privately, May was regarded as difficult to work with, and often quarrelled with her father. She worked with other directors, including Karl Grune in The Count of Charolais (1922) and Max Mack in Die Fledermaus (1923) opposite Lya de Putti. She starred alongside Alfred Abel in Scheine des Todes (1923), which was directed by her second husband, Lothar Mendes. The most successful films she starred in were Paganini (1923) with Conrad Veidt, and Old Heidelberg (1923) with Paul Hartmann. Her final film was Der geheime Agent (1924).

May married for a third time to Manfred Noa, but they divorced shortly after. After Fritz Mandl refused to marry her, Eva May committed suicide. The previous year May had attempted to commit suicide by slashing her wrists after Rudolf Sieber broke off their engagement and married Marlene Dietrich.

== Selected filmography ==
- Die geheimnisvolle Villa (1914)
- Sadja (1918)
- The Enchanted Princess (1919)
- State Attorney Jordan (1919)
- Irrlicht (1919)
- The Fairy of Saint Ménard (1919)
- Black Pearls (1919)
- The Foolish Heart (1919)
- The Commandment of Love (1919)
- The Bride of the Incapacitated (1919)
- In the Whirl of Life (1920)
- The Legend of Holy Simplicity (1920)
- Der Henker von Sankt Marien (1920)
- Junge Mama (1921)
- The Amazon (1921)
- Der Graf von Charolais (1922)
- The Earl of Essex (1922)
- His Excellency from Madagascar (1922)
- Paganini (1923)
- Old Heidelberg (1923)
- Die Fledermaus (1923)
- Der geheime Agent (1924)

== Bibliography ==
- Barton, Ruth. Hedy Lamarr: The Most Beautiful Woman in Film. University Press of Kentucky, 2010.
- Bergfelder, Tim & Bock, Hans-Michael. The Concise Cinegraph: Encyclopedia of German. Berghahn Books, 2009.
