= Nocturne of Love (1919 film) =

- Directed by: Carl Boese
- Written by: Hans Brennert; Friedel Köhne
- Produced by: Max Nivelli
- Starring: Conrad Veidt; Clementine Plessner
- Production company: Nivelli-Film-Fabrikation
- Release date: 1919
- Country: Germany
- Languages: Silent; German intertitles

Nocturne of Love (German: Nocturno der Liebe) is a 1919 German silent historical film directed by Carl Boese and starring Conrad Veidt and Clementine Plessner. It portrays the life of the composer Frederic Chopin and is known by the alternative title Chopin.

== Cast ==
In alphabetical order

- Hermann Bachmann
- Rita Clermont as Mariolka
- Erna Denera as George Sand
- Erwin Fichtner
- Clementine Plessner
- Ludwig Rex
- Hella Thornegg
- Conrad Veidt as Frederic Chopin
- Gertrude Welcker as Sonja Radkowska
