= Evi Eva =

German actress (1899–1985)

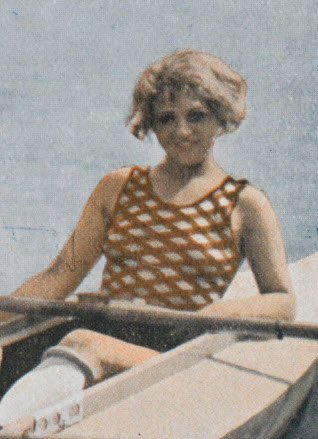
- Born: 30 December 1899; Berlin, German Empire
- Died: 4 January 1985 (aged 85); West Berlin, West Germany
- Other name: Elly Giese
- Occupation: Actress
- Years active: 1919-1938 (film)

Evi Eva (1899–1985) was a German film actress.

== Selected filmography ==
- The Eyes as the Accuser (1920)
- The Secrets of Berlin (1921)
- At the Edge of the Great City (1922)
- Hallig Hooge (1923)
- The Heart of Lilian Thorland (1924)
- Mister Radio (1924)
- The Hobgoblin (1924)
- Gobseck (1924)
- The King and the Girl (1925)
- Athletes (1925)
- The Morals of the Alley (1925)
- The Salesgirl from the Fashion Store (1925)
- The Marriage Swindler (1925)
- The Last Horse Carriage in Berlin (1926)
- The Great Duchess (1926)
- Annemarie and Her Cavalryman (1926)
- The Violet Eater (1926)
- I Liked Kissing Women (1926)
- The Orlov (1927)
- The Lady with the Tiger Skin (1927)
- The Prince's Child (1927)
- Forbidden Love (1927)
- Immorality (1928)
- Today I Was With Frieda (1928)
- Only a Viennese Woman Kisses Like That (1928)
- Dawn (1929)
- We Stick Together Through Thick and Thin (1929)
- The Merry Wives of Vienna (1931)
- Shooting Festival in Schilda (1931)
- Urlaub auf Ehrenwort (1938)

== Bibliography ==
- Goble, Alan. The Complete Index to Literary Sources in Film. Walter de Gruyter, 1999.
