= Grete Reinwald =

German actress

- German postcard
- Born: 25 May 1902; Stuttgart, Kingdom of Württemberg, German Empire
- Died: 24 May 1983 (aged 81); Munich, Bavaria, West Germany
- Occupations: Actor, Stage
- Years active: 1914–1957
- Spouse: Fred Louis Lerch
- Relatives: Hanni Reinwald; Otto Reinwald

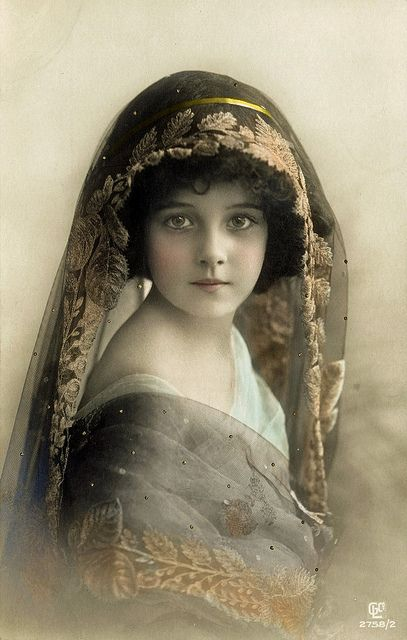
Grete Reinwald, Edwardian postcard, c. 1910

Grete Reinwald (25 May 1902 – 24 May 1983) was a German stage and film actress. As a child, due to her sweet, appealing features she modeled for many monochrome, hand-tinted and autochrome postcards. Her siblings Hanni Reinwald and Otto Reinwald were also actors.

== Selected filmography ==
- The Night of Decision (1920)
- Youth (1922)
- William Tell (1923)
- The Comedian's Child (1923)
- The Woman on the Panther (1923)
- Time Is Money (1923)
- Set Me Free (1924)
- The Gallows Bride (1924)
- The Four Marriages of Matthias Merenus (1924)
- Heart of Stone (1924)
- The Woman without Money (1925)
- The Assmanns (1925)
- What the Stones Tell (1925)
- Goetz von Berlichingen of the Iron Hand (1925)
- Golden Boy (1925)
- Ship in Distress (1925)
- Frisian Blood (1925)
- People of the Sea (1925)
- German Hearts on the German Rhine (1926)
- Fräulein Mama (1926)
- The Hunter of Fall (1926)
- The Eleven Schill Officers (1926)
- Assassination (1927)
- I Stand in the Dark Midnight (1927)
- On the Banks of the River Weser (1927)
- Rutschbahn (1928)
- Give Me Life (1928)
- Autumn on the Rhine (1928)
- Kolonne X (1929)
- Big City Children (1929)
- For Once I'd Like to Have No Troubles (1932)
- Hans Westmar (1933)
- Streak of Steel (1935)
- The Haunted Castle (1936)
- Women for Golden Hill (1938)
- Stern von Rio (1940)
- The Scapegoat (1940)
- The Great Love (1942)
- Who Is This That I Love? (1950)
- Captive Soul (1952)
- The Chaplain of San Lorenzo (1953)
