= Emilia Unda =

Baltic German actress

- Born: 29 January 1879; Riga, Latvia; Russian Empire
- Died: 7 December 1939 (aged 60); Berlin, Germany
- Occupation: Actress
- Years active: 1918 - 1935 (film)

Emilia Unda (January 29, 1879 – December 7, 1939) was a Baltic German stage and film actress. She is best known for her role as the headmistress in the 1931 film Mädchen in Uniform.

Unda was married to German architect Hugo Häring in 1918. However, the couple later divorced.

== Filmography ==
Year	Title	Role	Notes
1918	Es werde Licht! 4. Teil: Sündige Mütter	Therese Kallenbach	
1919	Der Tod und die Liebe	Alte Tekki	
1919	Freie Liebe		
1922	The Burning Soil	Alte Magd / Old maid	
1922	At the Edge of the Great City		
1923	The Stone Rider	Schaffnerin	
1923	Man by the Wayside	Wife of the shoemaker	
1930	Farewell	Pensionsinhaberin Frau. Weber	
1931	Inquest		
1931	The Scoundrel	Hermine, his wife	
1931	Mädchen in Uniform	Oberin des Stifts	
1932	The First Right of the Child		
1932	The White Demon		
1932	Haunted People		
1932	Baby	Miss Fitz	
1933	Manolescu, der Fürst der Diebe		
1934	Pappi	Tante Anna	
1934	I for You, You for Me	Frau Häberlein	
1934	The Old and the Young King	Frau von Ramen	
1935	Barcarola	Wirtin	(final film role)

== Bibliography ==
- Langford, Michelle. Directory of World Cinema: Germany. Intellect Books, 2012.
