= The Night of Decision (1920 film) =

1920 film

- German: Die Nacht der Entscheidung
- Directed by: Franz Osten
- Written by: Alfred Schirokauer
- Starring: Erich Kaiser-Titz; Henri Peters-Arnolds; Grete Reinwald
- Production company: Münchener Kunstfilm Peter Ostermayr
- Release date: 29 March 1920
- Country: Germany
- Languages: Silent; German intertitles

The Night of Decision (German: Die Nacht der Entscheidung) is a 1920 German silent drama film directed by Franz Osten and starring Erich Kaiser-Titz, Henri Peters-Arnolds and Grete Reinwald.

The film's sets were designed by the art director Karl Machus.

== Cast ==
- Erich Kaiser-Titz as Minister of finance Count Menari
- Henri Peters-Arnolds as Count Barella
- Grete Reinwald as Angelina
- Emil Mamelok as Prince
- Carl Sick as Minister for Home Affairs Marquis Diaconi
