= Neubeuern =

Town in Bavaria, Germany

- Municipality
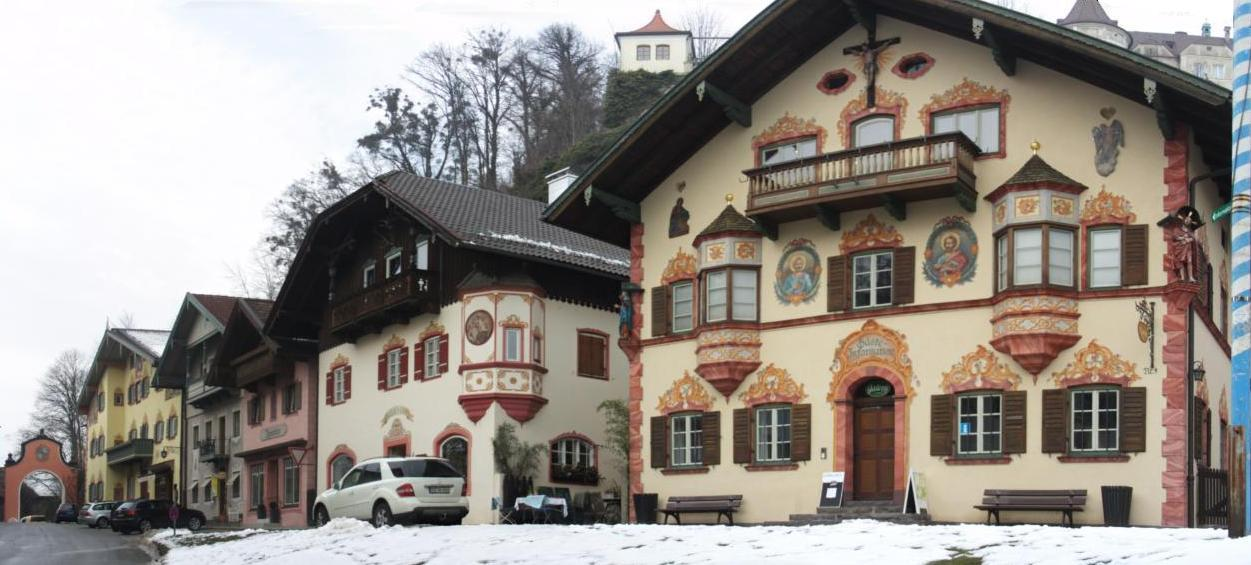
- Neubeuern Market Square

- Coat of arms

- Location of Neubeuern within Rosenheim district
- Interactive map of Neubeuern
- Location within Germany Location within Bavaria
- Coordinates: 47°46′N 12°9′E
- Country: Germany
- State: Bavaria
- Admin. region: Oberbayern
- District: Rosenheim
- Founded: 788
- Subdivisions: 31 Districts

Government
  - Mayor (2019–25): Christoph Schneider

Area
  - Total: 15.32 km^{2} (5.92 sq mi)
- Elevation: 478 m (1,568 ft)

Population (2025-12-31)
  - Total: 4,130
  - Density: 270/km^{2} (698/sq mi)
- Time zone: UTC+01:00 (CET)
  - Summer (DST): UTC+02:00 (CEST)
- Postal codes: 83115
- Dialling codes: 08035
- Vehicle registration: RO
- Website: kulturdorf-neubeuern.de

Neubeuern (German pronunciation: [ˈnɔʏbɔʏɐn]) is a municipality in the district of Rosenheim in Bavaria in Germany. It lies on the river Inn.

== History ==
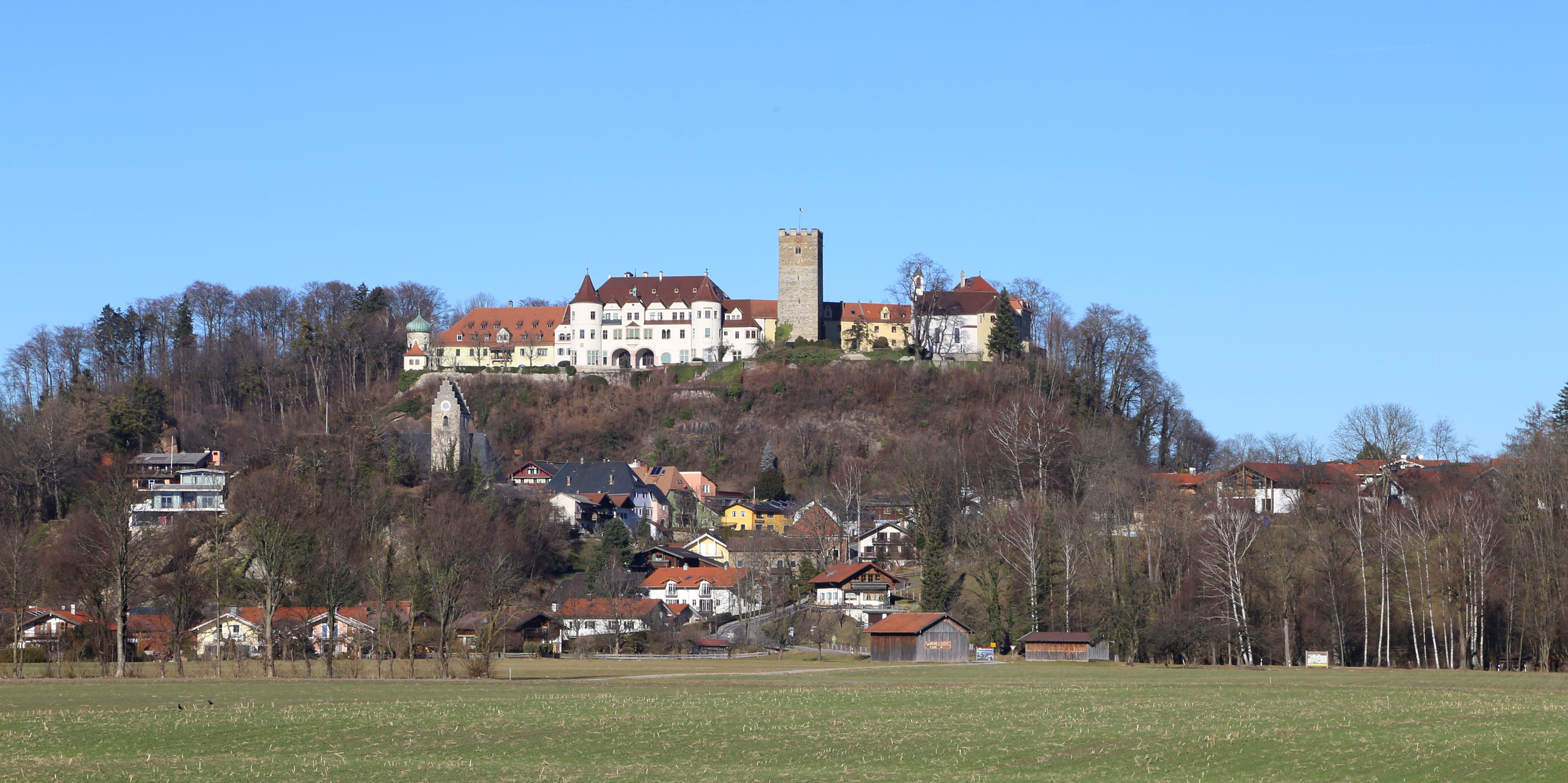
The castle with part of the village

Neubeuern was first mentioned in a document in 788. Since the 12th century, there has been a castle in Neubeuern, which is now Castle Neubeuern. During the Nazi era, the castle was a National Socialist political special school and from May 1942 until the fall of Nazi Germany, the site of a National Political Institute of Education. Today there is a residential school in the castle.
