= Paganini (1923 film) =

1923 film

- Directed by: Heinz Goldberg
- Written by: Paul Beyer; Heinz Goldberg
- Produced by: Richard Oswald
- Starring: Conrad Veidt; Eva May; Greta Schröder
- Cinematography: Stephan Lorant; Károly Vass
- Music by: Mischa Spoliansky
- Production companies: Conrad Veidt-Film; Richard-Oswald-Produktion
- Release date: 31 March 1923
- Running time: 90 minutes
- Country: Germany
- Languages: Silent; German intertitles

Paganini is a 1923 German silent historical film directed by Heinz Goldberg and starring Conrad Veidt, Eva May and Greta Schröder.

The film's sets were designed by the art director Robert Neppach.

This is considered a lost film.

== Cast ==
- Conrad Veidt as Niccolò Paganini
- Eva May as Giulietta
- Greta Schröder as Antonia Paganini
- Harry Hardt as The Duke
- Hermine Sterler as The Duchess
- Jean Nadolovitch as Hector Berlioz
- Gustav Fröhlich as Franz Liszt
- Alexander Granach as Ferucchio
- Martin Herzberg as Achille, Son of Paganini

== Bibliography ==
- Charles P. Mitchell. The Great Composers Portrayed on Film, 1913 through 2002. McFarland, 2004.
