= The Heart of a German Mother =

1926 film directed by Géza von Bolváry

- Margarete Kupfer and Heinz Rühmann in a scene from the film
- German: Das deutsche Mutterherz
- Directed by: Géza von Bolváry
- Written by: Margarete-Maria Langen
- Starring: Margarete Kupfer; Heinz Rühmann; Julius Messaros; Ellen Kürti
- Cinematography: Hans Karl Gottschalk
- Music by: Hans May
- Production company: Ewe Film
- Distributed by: Süd-Film
- Release date: 8 August 1926
- Country: Germany
- Languages: Silent; German intertitles

The Heart of a German Mother (German: Das deutsche Mutterherz) is a 1926 German silent drama film directed by Géza von Bolváry and starring Margarete Kupfer, Heinz Rühmann, and Julius Messaros. The film marked Rühmann's debut, beginning a screen career that lasted until his death in 1994.

== Cast ==
- Margarete Kupfer as Witwe Erdmann
- Heinz Rühmann as Oscar
- Julius Messaros as Julius
- Ellen Kürti as Kellnerin
- Vera Voronina
- Helene von Bolváry
- Carl Walther Meyer
- Leon Epp
- Max Weydner
