= Man by the Wayside =

1923 film

- Future star Marlene Dietrich (right)
- Directed by: William Dieterle
- Written by: William Dieterle; Leo Tolstoy (novel)
- Starring: Alexander Granach; Emilia Unda; William Dieterle
- Cinematography: Willy Hameister
- Production company: Osmania-Film
- Release date: 12 June 1923
- Country: Germany
- Languages: Silent; German intertitles

Man by the Wayside (German: Der Mensch am Wege) is a 1923 German silent drama film directed by William Dieterle and starring Alexander Granach, Emilia Unda and Dieterle.

It was Dieterle's first film as director, and featured Marlene Dietrich in a supporting role. Twenty years later he would direct her again the 1944 Hollywood film Kismet.

== Cast ==
- Alexander Granach as Shoemaker
- Emilia Unda as Wife of the shoemaker
- William Dieterle as Michael
- Heinrich George as Gutsbesitzer
- Wilhelm Völcker as Kutscher
- Sophie Pagay as Krämersfrau
- Marlene Dietrich as Krämerstochter
- Wilhelm Diegelmann as Wirt
- Liselotte Rolle as Kind des Schusters
- Max Pohl as Amtmann
- Ludwig Rex as Aufseher
- Ernst Gronau as Arzt
- Fritz Rasp as Farmhand
- Werner Pledath as Knechte
- Dolly Lorenz as Magd
- Gerhard Bienert
- Georg Hilbert
- Fritz Kampers
- Hermine Körner
- Max Nemetz
- Lotte Stein

== Bibliography ==
- Bock, Hans-Michael & Bergfelder, Tim. The Concise CineGraph. Encyclopedia of German Cinema. Berghahn Books, 2009.
