= The Way to the Light =

1923 film directed by Géza von Bolváry

- German: Der Weg zum Licht
- Directed by: Géza von Bolváry
- Starring: Gustav Fröhlich; Helene von Bolváry
- Cinematography: Franz Koch
- Production company: Münchner Lichtspielkunst
- Distributed by: Bavaria Film
- Release date: 1923
- Country: Germany
- Languages: Silent; German intertitles

The Way to the Light (German: Der Weg zum Licht) is a 1923 German silent film directed by Géza von Bolváry and Kurt Rosen.

It was shot at the Emelka Studios in Munich. The film's sets were designed by the art director Willy Reiber.

== Cast ==
In alphabetical order

- Emil Fenyő
- Gustav Fröhlich
- Fritz Greiner
- Georg Henrich
- Hanni Reinwald
- Berta Reuscher
- Ernst Rückert
- Otto Stoeckel
- Helene von Bolváry
- Carl Wagner
- Toni Wittels
