= The Secret of the Duchess =

1923 film

- Directed by: Klaus Albrecht
- Written by: Bob Hopkins
- Starring: Nils Asther; Stella Arbenina; Arnold Korff
- Production company: Landlicht-Film
- Distributed by: Landlicht-Filmverleih
- Release date: 6 February 1923
- Country: Germany
- Languages: Silent; German intertitles

The Secret of the Duchess (German: Das Geheimnis der Herzogin) is a 1923 German silent drama film directed by Klaus Albrecht and starring Nils Asther, Stella Arbenina and Arnold Korff.

== Cast ==
- Nils Asther
- Stella Arbenina
- Arnold Korff
- Theodor Berthels
- Agda Nilsson
- Hans Laskus
- Paul Rehkopf
- Claus Tiedke

== Bibliography ==
- Hans J. Wollstein. Strangers in Hollywood: the history of Scandinavian actors in American films from 1910 to World War II. Scarecrow Press, 1994.
