= Emil Justitz =

Austrian film director and producer

- Born: 3 May 1878; Vienna, Austrian Empire
- Died: December 16, 1932 (aged 54); Berlin, Germany
- Occupations: Producer, Director
- Years active: 1907–1931 (film)

Emil Justitz (May 3, 1878 – December 16, 1932) was an Austrian film director and producer of the silent era.

== Selected filmography ==
- Martyr of His Heart (1918)
- Maria Pavlowna (1919)
- The Red Poster (1920)
- The Hustler (1920)
- Demon Circus (1923)
- The Stolen Professor (1924)
- Poor as a Church Mouse (dir. Richard Oswald, 1931)

== Bibliography ==
- Grange, William. Cultural Chronicle of the Weimar Republic. Scarecrow Press, 2008.
