= Ludwig Rex =

German actor

- Born: 1 January 1888; Berlin, German Empire
- Died: 29 September 1979 (aged 91); London, England
- Occupation: Actor
- Years active: 1918–1927

Ludwig Rex (1 January 1888 – 29 September 1979) was a German film actor of the silent era. He appeared in 55 films between 1918 and 1927. He was born in Berlin, Germany and died in London.

== Selected filmography ==
- Totenkopfreiter (1917) – Napoleon
- The Merry Wives of Windsor (1918) – Herr Reich
- Arno Starks Kraft (1918) – Arno Stark
- Der Fluch des Nuri (1918) – Nuri
- Nocturne of Love (1919)
- Die lachende Seele (1919)
- Der neue Herr Generaldirektor (1919)
- Homo sum (1919)
- Seelenverkäufer (1919) – Kapitän Brooks
- Die Geächteten (1919) – Wirt Petruk Czapka
- Um Diamanten und Frauen (1919) – Mr. Hunter
- Retter der Menschheit (1919) – Felsen
- Fluch der Vergangenheit (1919) – Bertram
- Der Glücksschmid (1919) – Tobias Möhring, Dorfschmied
- Luxuspflänzchen (1919)
- Die Teufelsgeige (1919)
- Die siebente Großmacht (1919)
- Der Tintenfischclub (1919)
- Gewalt gegen Recht (1920)
- The Song of the Puszta (1920)
- Blackmailed (1920) – Erpresser
- Angelo, das Mysterium des Schlosses Drachenegg (1920) – Alliwer
- The Cabinet of Dr. Caligari (1920) – Ein Mörder / A murderer (uncredited)
- The Dancer Barberina (1920) – Reeder Josuah Crichton
- The Eyes as the Accuser (1920)
- Gauner der Gesellschaft (1920) – Kommissar
- Die Strahlen des Todes (1920)
- Nirvana (1920, part 2–6)
- Die Sklavenhalter von Kansas-City (1920)
- Bar el Manach (1920)
- The Skull of Pharaoh's Daughter (1920)
- Marionetten des Teufels (1920)
- Die andere Welt (1920)
- The Black Guest (1920)
- Der Hund von Baskerville (1920, part 6)
- Der Flüchtling von Sing-Sing (1920)
- Tschetschensen-Rache (1921)
- The Conspiracy in Genoa (1921)
- Die Beichte einer Gefallenen (1921)
- Hands Up (1921)
- Night and No Morning (1921)
- Sons of the Night (1921, part 1, 2)
- The Terror of the Red Mill (1921) – Direktor Brighton
- The Shadow of Gaby Leed (1921)
- Deceiver of the People (1921)
- Fortunato (1921, part 1)
- Die verschwundene Million (1921, part 3)
- Women's Sacrifice (1922) – Verwalter
- Othello (1922)
- Der Fall Gembalsky (1922)
- Die Flibustier (1922) – Mr. Pierson
- Hallig Hooge (1923)
- Die Welt in Flammen (1923, part 1) – Generalstabschef Kerga
- Man by the Wayside (1923) – Aufseher
- Esterella (1923)
- The Beautiful Girl (1923) – Arzt
- Inge Larsen (1924)
- Slaves of Love (1924)
- The Third Watch (1924) – Gyttorps Sekretär
- Ein Traum ein Leben (1924) – Lucas von Lutovice
- Düstere Schatten, strahlendes Glück (1924) – Dr. West
- Ash Wednesday (1925)
- ...und es lockt ein Ruf aus sündiger Welt (1925) – Gottlieb Haberkorn
- Die Großstadt der Zukunft (1925)
- Die Beute (1925) – Henrik Bark
- The Clever Fox (1926)
- Die Welt ohne Waffen (1927) – Mitglied der Gesellschaft der Friedensfreunde
- The Long Intermission (1927) – Onkel Eduard
