= Hella Tornegg =

German actress

- Born: Hella Rieffel; 31 December 1878; Berlin, German Empire
- Died: c. 1945; Germany
- Other names: Hella Thornegg
- Occupation: Actress
- Years active: 1900–1944

Hella Tornegg was a German stage and film actress.

== Selected filmography ==
- Lehmann's Honeymoon (1916)
- Spring Storms (1918)
- Film Kathi (1918)
- Nocturne of Love (1919)
- The Monastery of Sendomir (1919)
- Blackmailed (1920)
- The Voice (1920)
- Humanity Unleashed (1920)
- Black Forest Girl (1929)
- Bashful Felix (1934)
- Inkognito (1936)
- The Divine Jetta (1937)
- Love Can Lie (1937)
- Doctor Crippen (1942)
- Bravo Acrobat! (1943)
- My Summer Companion (1943)
- Young Hearts (1944)
- Marriage of Affection (1944)
- The Noltenius Brothers (1945)

== Bibliography ==
- Jung, Uli & Schatzberg, Walter. Beyond Caligari: The Films of Robert Wiene. Berghahn Books, 1999.
