= Colette Corder =

German actress (1894–1982)

- Born: 28 February 1894; German Empire
- Died: 10 December 1982 (aged 88)
- Occupation: Actress
- Years active: 1919–1937 (film)

Colette Corder (February 28, 1894 – December 10, 1982) was a German stage and film actress.

== Selected filmography ==
- The Black Guest (1920)
- Count Varenne's Lover (1921)
- The Asian Sun (1921)
- The Courier from Lisbon (1921)
- Hands Up (1921)
- Off the Rails (1921)
- The Nights of Cornelis Brouwer (1921)
- The Men of Frau Clarissa (1922)
- The Strumpet's Plaything (1922)
- The Big Thief (1922)
- Morass (1922)
- The Marriage of Princess Demidoff (1922)
- Time Is Money (1923)
- Eyes Open, Harry! (1926)

== Bibliography ==
- Rogowski, Christian. The Many Faces of Weimar Cinema: Rediscovering Germany's Filmic Legacy. Camden House, 2010.
