= Karl Beckersachs =

German actor (1886–1951)

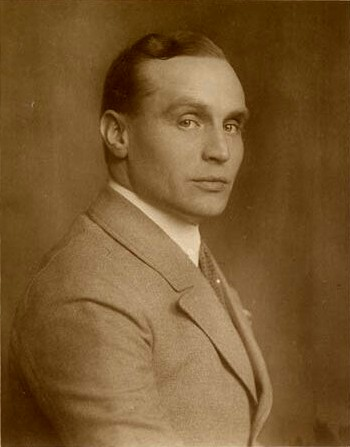
- Born: Karl Nikolaus Beckersachs; 26 September 1886; Bad Soden, Hesse, German Empire
- Died: 31 March 1951 (aged 64); Bad Kreuznach, Rhineland-Palatinate, West Germany
- Other name: Carl Beckersachs
- Occupation: Actor
- Years active: 1912-1936 (film)

Karl Beckersachs (1886–1951) was a German stage and film actor. He is sometimes credited as Carl Beckersachs.

== Selected filmography ==
- His Majesty the Hypochondriac (1918)
- Midnight (1918)
- In the Castle by the Lake (1918)
- Hedda's Revenge (1919)
- The Gambler (1919)
- The Fateful Day (1921)
- Hannerl and Her Lovers (1921)
- The Five Frankfurters (1922)
- Maciste and Prisoner 51 (1923)
- The Secret Agent (1924)
- Girls You Don't Marry (1924)
- The Brigantine of New York (1924)
- What the Stones Tell (1925)
- A Waltz Dream (1925)
- Oh Those Glorious Old Student Days (1925)
- Ash Wednesday (1925)
- The Salesgirl from the Fashion Store (1925)
- People in Need (1925)
- The Old Ballroom (1925)
- Semi-Silk (1925)
- Department Store Princess (1926)
- The Beloved of His Highness (1928)

== Bibliography ==
- Goble, Alan. The Complete Index to Literary Sources in Film. Walter de Gruyter, 1999.
