= Die Fledermaus (1923 film) =

German silent film

- Directed by: Max Mack
- Written by: Robert Liebmann; Max Mack; Hans Steinhoff; Richard Genée (libretto Die Fledermaus); Karl Haffner (libretto Die Fledermaus); Henri Meilhac (play Le Réveillon); Ludovic Halévy (play Le Réveillon)
- Starring: Eva May; Lya De Putti; Harry Liedtke
- Cinematography: Alfred Hansen
- Music by: Alexander Schirmann
- Production company: Maxim-Film
- Release date: 13 April 1923
- Country: Germany
- Languages: Silent; German intertitles

Die Fledermaus is a 1923 German silent film directed by Max Mack and starring Eva May, Lya De Putti and Harry Liedtke. It is an adaptation of the operetta Die Fledermaus by Johann Strauss II, Karl Haffner and Richard Genée.

The film's sets were designed by the art director Ernst Stern.

== Cast ==
- Eva May as Rosalinde
- Lya De Putti as Adele
- Harry Liedtke as Gabriel von Eisenstein
- Paul Heidemann as Falke
- Ilka Grüning as Rosalindes Mutter
- Albert Patry as Rosalindes Vater
- Wilhelm Bendow as Alfred
- Jakob Tiedtke as Frosch
- Ernst Hofmann as Prinz Orlowsky
- Hans Junkermann as Gefängnisdirektor
- Hermann Picha as Sekretär bei Falke
- Paul Graetz as Botenjunge
- Hugo Döblin as Balettmeister

== Bibliography ==
- Fawkes, Richard (2000). Opera on Film. London: Duckworth. ISBN 978-0-7156-2943-7.
