= Carl Walther Meyer =

German actor

- Born: 1 February 1898; Dresden, German Empire
- Died: 12 March 1985 (aged 87); Waldkirch, West Germany
- Occupation: Actor
- Years active: 1919–1936

Carl Walther Meyer (1 February 1898 – 12 March 1985) was a German stage and film actor and film editor. Meyer appeared in more than fifty productions during the silent and early sound eras.

== Selected filmography ==
- Women Who Fall by the Wayside (1925)
- The Royal Grenadiers (1925)
- The Adventurous Wedding (1925)
- The Heart of a German Mother (1926)
- Little Inge and Her Three Fathers (1926)
- The Seventh Son (1926)
- Klettermaxe (1927)
- Valencia (1927)
- At Ruedesheimer Castle There Is a Lime Tree (1928)
- Assassination (1927)
- German Women - German Faithfulness (1927)
- Leontine's Husbands (1928)
- Eva in Silk (1928)
- Suzy Saxophone (1928)
- The Call of the North (1929)
- The Caviar Princess (1930)
- Paprika (1932)
- The Ringer (1932)
- The Love Hotel (1933)
- Heinz in the Moon (1934)
- Music in the Blood (1934)
- Holiday From Myself (1934)
- Winter Night's Dream (1935)
- Paul and Pauline (1936)
- The Empress's Favourite (1936)

== Bibliography ==
- Rolf Giesen & Manfred Hobsch. Hitlerjunge Quex, Jud Süss und Kolberg. Schwarzkopf & Schwarzkopf, 2005.
