= The Fateful Day (1921 film) =

1921 film

- Directed by: Adolf E. Licho
- Written by: Alfred Fekete
- Starring: Mady Christians; Kurt Stieler; Karl Beckersachs
- Cinematography: Willy Gaebel
- Production company: Messter Film
- Distributed by: UFA
- Release date: 21 October 1921
- Country: Germany
- Languages: Silent; German intertitles

The Fateful Day (German: Der Schicksalstag) is a 1921 German silent film directed by Adolf E. Licho and starring Mady Christians, Kurt Stieler, and Karl Beckersachs.

The film's sets were designed by the art director Robert Neppach.

== Cast ==
- Mady Christians as Felicitas / Harriet Steel / Jelena / Marietta
- Kurt Stieler as Baron Rafale
- Karl Beckersachs as Jonny Steel
- Ilka Grüning as Gräfin
- William Huch
- Eugen Klöpfer
- Albert Paul
- Harald Paulsen
- Rolf Prasch
- Ernst Rückert as Graf
- Franz Schönfeld
- Richard Starnburg
- Hans Sternberg

== Bibliography ==
- Bock, Hans-Michael; Bergfelder, Tim, eds. (2009). The Concise Cinegraph: Encyclopaedia of German Cinema. New York: Berghahn Books. ISBN 978-1-57181-655-9.
