= Maciste and Prisoner 51 =

1923 film

- Directed by: Luigi Romano Borgnetto
- Written by: Paul Rosenhayn
- Produced by: Jakob Karol
- Starring: Bartolomeo Pagano; Karl Beckersachs; Karl Falkenberg
- Production company: Jakob Karol Film
- Distributed by: Jakob Karol Film
- Release date: March 1923
- Country: Germany
- Languages: Silent; German intertitles

Maciste and Prisoner 51 (German: Maciste und der Sträfling Nr. 51) is a 1923 German silent action film directed by Luigi Romano Borgnetto and starring Bartolomeo Pagano, Karl Beckersachs and Karl Falkenberg. It was one of several German films featuring the Italian peplum hero Maciste.

== Cast ==
- Bartolomeo Pagano as Maciste
- Karl Beckersachs
- Karl Falkenberg
- Leopold von Ledebur

== Bibliography ==
- Roy Kinnard & Tony Crnkovich. Italian Sword and Sandal Films, 1908–1990. McFarland, 2017.
