= Stella Arbenina =

English actress (1884–1976)

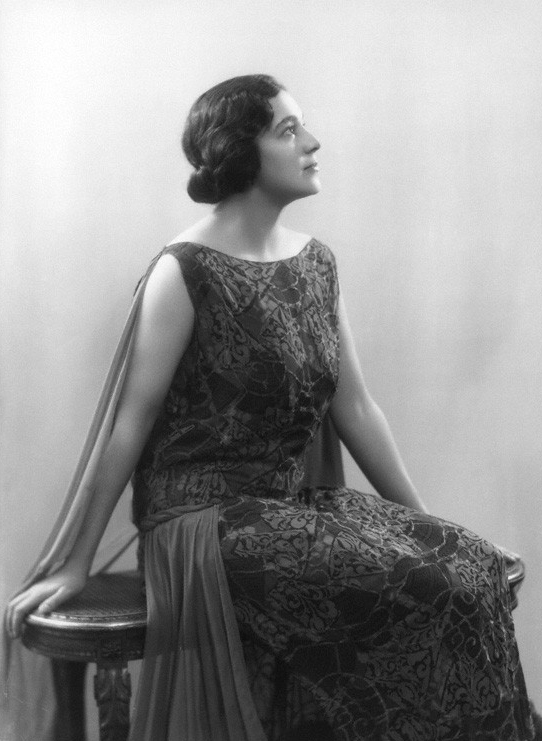
- Stella Arbenina in 1923
- Born: Stella Zoe Whishaw; 27 September 1884; St. Petersburg, Russia
- Died: 26 April 1976 (aged 91); Surrey, England, UK
- Occupation: Actress

Stella Arbenina, Baroness Meyendorff (Стелла Арбенина; 27 September 1884 – 26 April 1976) was a Russian-born English actress.

She was born Stella Zoe Whishaw in St. Petersburg to Robert Cattley Whishaw and Mary (née Gisiko). Her father was British and her mother hailed from an Anglo-Russian family who had made their home in Russia for several generations. Stella's brother was Montague Law Whishaw. Another relative, James Whishaw, was a British businessman in St Petersburg, who published his memoirs, A history of the Whishaw family, in London in 1935.

She was married in 1907 to Baron Paul Meyendorff, Captain in the Horse Guards and Aides-de-camp to Tsar Nicholas II in 1907 and then later Colonel in his Military Secretariat. Arbenina and Meyendorff had three children, Georgi, Helena and Irina.

During the Russian Revolution the family suffered greatly under the Bolsheviks. Their possessions were seized and they were imprisoned. Through efforts by the Baltic Germans Committee they were released from prison and finally permitted to leave Russia at end of 1918. They settled briefly in Estonia where they lived on a remnant of the family estates. Arbenina acted in theatres in Tallinn and Tartu, and also in Berlin, from 1921 to 1922. In 1923, she arrived with children in London, where she permanently settled, appearing in English stage and film roles. In 1930, she released her memoirs, Through Terror to Freedom, which describes her experiences during the Russian Revolution.

== Selected filmography ==
- The Burning Soil (1922)
- The Flight into Marriage (1922)
- Miss Rockefeller Is Filming (1922)
- King of Women (1923)
- The Money Devil (1923)
- The Secret of the Duchess (1923)
- The Last Witness (1925)
- The Secret Kingdom (1925)
- A Woman Redeemed (1927)
- Bracelets (1931)
- Monsieur the Duke (1931)
- Stamboul (1931)
- Colonel Blood (1934)
- What Happened Then? (1934)
- Fine Feathers (1937)
- Merry Comes to Town (1937)
- Stolen Life (1939)
