= The Wheels of Destiny =

1923 film

- Directed by: Franz Osten
- Written by: Marie Luise Droop
- Cinematography: Franz Koch
- Production company: Münchner Lichtspielkunst
- Distributed by: Bavaria Film
- Release date: December 1923
- Country: Germany
- Languages: Silent; German intertitles

The Wheels of Destiny (German:Das rollende Schicksal) is a 1923 German silent film directed by Franz Osten.

The film's art direction was by Max Heilbronner.

== Cast ==
In alphabetical order

- Colette Brettel
- Fritz Greiner
- Ludwig Götz
- Charles Willy Kayser
- Ellen Kürti
- Ferdinand Martini
- Ernst Rückert

== Bibliography ==
- Sanjit Narwekar. Directory of Indian film-makers and films. Flicks Books, 1994.
