= Time Is Money (film) =

1923 film

- Directed by: Fred Sauer
- Written by: Robert Heymann (novel); Fred Sauer; Walter Wassermann
- Starring: Grete Reinwald; Colette Corder; Fritz Rasp
- Cinematography: Heinrich Gärtner
- Production company: Hermes-Film
- Distributed by: Süd-Film
- Release date: 19 July 1923
- Country: Germany
- Languages: Silent; German intertitles

Time Is Money is a 1923 German silent film directed by Fred Sauer and starring Grete Reinwald, Colette Corder and Fritz Rasp. The film was released in Germany with its title in English. It premiered at the Marmorhaus in Berlin. The film's sets were designed by the art director Fritz Lederer.

== Cast ==
- Grete Reinwald as Irene Arven
- Colette Corder as Colette
- Alfred Gerasch as Georg de Gobert
- Fritz Rasp as François
- Hermann Picha as Glanden
- Harry Berber as Mac Collin
- Heinz Salfner as Marc Arven
- Carl Wilhelm Tetting as William
- Philipp Manning

== Bibliography ==
- Bock, Hans-Michael & Bergfelder, Tim. The Concise CineGraph. Encyclopedia of German Cinema. Berghahn Books, 2009.
