= Ewald Daub =

German cinematographer (1889–1946)

- Born: 13 October 1889; Brunswick, Duchy of Brunswick, German Empire
- Died: 4 November 1946 (aged 57); Berlin, Brandenburg; Allied-occupied Germany
- Occupation: Cinematographer
- Years active: 1919–1946

Ewald Daub (13 October 1889 – 4 November 1946) was a German cinematographer who shot more than a hundred films during his career. Daub entered the film industry during the silent era, with one of his first films being the biopic Martin Luther (1923). Over the next two decades he was to work on a number of Harry Piel thrillers and Heinz Rühmann comedies. He died in 1946 following an operation.

== Selected filmography ==
- Miss Venus (1921)
- A Dying Nation (1922)
- Martin Luther (1923)
- Helena (1924)
- The Brigantine of New York (1924)
- Girls You Don't Marry (1924)
- Reluctant Imposter (1925)
- Love Story (1925)
- The Man in the Saddle (1925)
- Die Tragödie zweier Menschen (1925)
- Der Schuß in den Schatten (1925)
- Our Emden (1926)
- Crooks in Tails (1927)
- Assassination (1927)
- Lützow's Wild Hunt (1927)
- His Strongest Weapon (1928)
- Man Against Man (1928)
- Immorality (1928)
- Panic (1928)
- Taxi at Midnight (1929)
- His Best Friend (1929)
- Men Without Work (1929)
- Achtung! – Auto-Diebe! (1930)
- People in the Fire (1930)
- Him or Me (1930)
- Wellen der Leidenschaft (1930)
- Bobby Gets Going (1931)
- Shadows of the Underworld (1931)
- The Captain from Köpenick (1931)
- Johnny Steals Europe (1932)
- The Heath Is Green (1932)
- Ship Without a Harbour (1932)
- Secret Agent (1932)
- Little Man, What Now? (1933)
- The Black Forest Girl (1933)
- Honour Among Thieves (1933)
- Jumping Into the Abyss (1933)
- Tell Me Who You Are (1933)
- Master of the World (1934)
- Paganini (1934)
- The World Without a Mask (1934)
- Love Conquers All (1934)
- The Grand Duke's Finances (1934)
- Artisten (1935)
- The Bird Seller (1935)
- Last Stop (1935)
- Counsel for Romance (1936)
- The Czar's Courier (1936)
- Intermezzo (1936)
- The Beggar Student (1936)
- Michel Strogoff (1936)
- A Woman of No Importance (1936)
- Gordian the Tyrant (1937)
- Dance on the Volcano (1938)
- Five Million Look for an Heir (1938)
- The Indian Tomb (1938)
- The Tiger of Eschnapur (1938)
- Maria Ilona (1939)
- Men Are That Way (1939)
- The False Step (1939)
- The Swedish Nightingale (1941)
- Andreas Schlüter (1942)
- Die Feuerzangenbowle (1944)
- Quax in Afrika (1947)

== Bibliography ==
- Wipfler, Esther Pia. Martin Luther in Motion Pictures: History of a Metamorphosis. Vandenhoeck & Ruprecht, 2011.
