= Demon Circus =

1923 film directed by Emil Justitz

- Directed by: Emil Justitz
- Written by: Paula Busch (novel); Wolfgang Geiger
- Produced by: Emil Justitz
- Starring: Gertrude Welcker; Eduard von Winterstein; Carl de Vogt
- Cinematography: Eugen Hrich; Erich Waschneck
- Production company: Börnstad-Justitz-Film
- Distributed by: Decla-Film
- Release date: 26 January 1923
- Country: Germany
- Languages: Silent; German intertitles

Demon Circus (German: Dämon Zirkus) is a 1923 German silent drama film directed by Emil Justitz and starring Gertrude Welcker, Eduard von Winterstein, and Carl de Vogt. It is part of the Circus film genre. The film's sets were designed by the art director Hans Jacoby.

== Cast ==
- Gertrude Welcker
- Eduard von Winterstein
- Carl de Vogt
- Cläre Lotto
- Maly Delschaft
- Viktor Schwannecke
- Rudolf Klein-Rhoden
- Olga Limburg
- Paul Biensfeldt
- Margarete Kupfer
- Ruth Weyher
- Gerhard Tandar

== Bibliography ==
- Grange, William (2008). Cultural Chronicle of the Weimar Republic. Lanham, MD: Scarecrow Press. ISBN 978-0-8108-5967-8.
