= Ellen Kürti =

Hungarian actress

- Born: Erzsébet Kürthy; 28 June 1903 (age 123); Budapest, Hungary
- Occupation: Actress
- Years active: 1922–1928 (film)

Ellen Kürti (born Erzsébet Kürthy) was a Hungarian-born film actress known for her roles in German cinema.

== Selected filmography ==
- The Wheels of Destiny (1923)
- Girls You Don't Marry (1924)
- Slaves of Love (1924)
- Women Who Fall by the Wayside (1925)
- Reluctant Imposter (1925)
- The Heart of a German Mother (1926)
- The Love of the Bajadere (1926)
- The Princess of the Riviera (1926)
- Assassination (1927)
- Memoirs of a Nun (1927)
- The Queen of the Variety (1927)
- Hotel Rats (1927)
- The Dashing Archduke (1927)
- Tragedy at the Royal Circus (1928)

== Bibliography ==
- Rachel A. Schildgen. More Than a Dream: Rediscovering the Life and Films of Vilma Banky. 1921 PVG Publishing, 2010.
