= Otto Voelckers =

German architect

Otto Voelckers (also spelled Otto Völckers) (9 November 1888 in Kassel - 6 December 1957) was a German architect and technical author.

== Biography ==
Voelckers was initially an active art director in the 1920s. However, at the end of this decade he became famous in Germany for his work with the Finnish architect Alvar Aalto. In 1928, Erich Dieckmann furnished several rooms of Otto Voelcker's model apartment with standard furniture; this furniture had been shown during the Home and Technology exhibition in Munich. Until 1933 Voelsckers was the editor of the magazine Stein Holz Eisen (Rock, wood, ice).

After the end of World War II he became very engaged with the reconstruction of Munich and was one of the few architects, that would link his ideas to the Neues Bauen movement, a radical new form proposed for the old city. Voelckers's reconstruction plan envisioned closed buildings composed of large blocks which were in cooperative ownership, which would have glassed-covered passages and retail areas to encourage use as social centers. Even in the planned reconstruction of the Goethe House, Voelckers pleaded for a full redesign, but was not able to successfully promote his idea over the faithful reconstruction proposed by Theo Kellner.

Voelckers was also known for his design of Notstands-Kleinstwohnungen, that was commissioned by the Münchener Wiederaufbau-Referat (Munich Reconstruction Referendum) of 1945–1946. These small apartments were allowed by the zoning commission to have a maximum space of 4 m^{2} per Person, with this restraint, Voelckers attempted to „Bestmögliche an Brauchbarkeit, Wohnlichkeit und Schönheit herauszuholen“ (Extract the most usability, livability and beauty from the space).

From 1950 until his death, he was the associate editor of the architectural magazine Glasforum. Voelckers was also member of the Deutscher Werkbund.

== Works ==
=== Papers ===
- Die neue Volksschule in Celle - Ein Beitrag zum Problem des neuzeitlichen Schulhauses. Verlag Englert & Schlosser, Frankfurt a/Main 1929
- Wohnbaufibel. Für Anfänger und solche, die glauben es nicht mehr zu sein. Julius Hoffmann Verlag, Stuttgart 1932
- Deutsche Hausfibel. Staackmann, Leipzig 1937
- Glas und Fenster. Ihr Wesen, ihre Geschichte und Bedeutung in der Gegenwart. Bauwelt Verlag, Berlin 1939
- Dorf und Stadt. Eine deutsche Fibel. Staackmann, Leipzig 1942
- Bauen mit Glas. Julius Hoffmann Verlag, Stuttgart 1948
- Das Grundrißwerk. Julius Hoffmann Verlag, Stuttgart 1949 (3. Auflage)
- Wohnraum und Hausrat. Eine Fibel. Baessler, Bamberg 1949
- So wohnen die Völker der Erde. Cassineum, Donauwörth 1949

=== Buildings and Designs ===
- 1914: Entwurf Haus Kammersänger K. in München
- vor 1915: Haus Dr. Drevermann in Frankfurt-Eschersheim, Häberlinstraße / Keßlerstraße (verändert)
- vor 1915: Entwurf zu einem Haus und Garten am Schloßberg in Marburg
- 1923: Entwurf der Kulissen zu dem zweiteiligen Monumentalfilm Helena
- 1925: Entwurf für ein großes Reihenhaus in dunkelroter Farbgebung für München
- vor 1926: Haus Auf der Kupferschmiede
- 1928: Kleinwohnung auf der Münchener Ausstellung „Heim und Technik“

== Filmography ==
- 1924: Helena
- 1926: Das deutsche Mutterherz
