= Helene von Bolváry =

Hungarian actress (1892–1943)

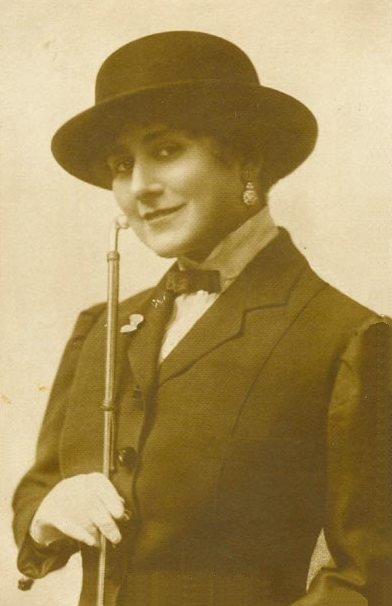
Photo of Helene von Bolvary

Helene von Bolváry (born Ilona Mattyasovszky; 1892–1943) was a Hungarian actress. She was the wife of the film director Géza von Bolváry.

== Selected filmography ==
- The Village Rogue (1916)
- White Rose (1919)
- The Way to the Light (1923)
- The Woman in Flames (1924)
- Girls You Don't Marry (1924)
- The Royal Grenadiers (1925)
- Women Who Fall by the Wayside (1925)
- The Heart of a German Mother (1926)
- The Love of the Bajadere (1926)
- I Stand in the Dark Midnight (1927)
- Tragedy at the Royal Circus (1928)
- He Goes Right, She Goes Left! (1928)
- Mädchenschicksale (1928)
- The Sinner (1928)
- The Woman on the Rack (1928)

== Bibliography ==
- Kulik, Karol (1990) [1975]. Alexander Korda: The Man Who Could Work Miracles. London: Virgin Books. ISBN 978-0-86369-446-2.
