= Max Nivelli =

Russian film producer

- Max Nivelli in 1925
- Born: Menachem Mendel Lewin; 1 January 1878; Kuźnica, Russian Empire
- Died: 27 February 1926 (aged 48); Berlin, Germany
- Occupation: Film producer
- Years active: 1918–1926

Max Nivelli (1 January 1878 – 27 February 1926) was a film producer in Berlin during the Weimar Republic era. He was among the first to examine the issues of anti-Semitism and prejudice in his films. Nivelli died at an early age (48) and worked in the film industry for less than 10 years, yet he produced 19 films, most of them full-length feature films. As most films of that era, his films were silent, black and white and shot on celluloid. Only his last film "Unity, Justice and Freedom" has so far been found, restored and digitized.

== Early life ==
Max Nivelli was born as Menachem (Mendel) Lewin in Kuźnica, a town on the eastern border of Poland, then part of the Russian Empire. His parents, Shmuel and Tsippa Lewin, were candy manufacturers. As a young man he emigrated to Berlin and between the years 1903–1911 he became the owner and partner in several companies which produced fruit preserves, candy and chocolates.

In 1904, he married Helene Kaufmann from Rozdzień, today a suburb of Katowice, Poland. They had two daughters: Dorothea and Regina.

In 1912, Mendel Lewin assumed the name Max Nivelli ("Nivelli" being almost an anagram of the name "Lewin"). He studied opera singing at the renowned Stern Conservatory in Berlin, appeared in many opera productions throughout Europe and also taught solo-singing (in German and Russian) in a music school in Berlin.

== Film production ==
In 1918, Nivelli established his first film production company "Nivelli-Film Fabrikation", with partner Erwin Kampf. That same year, the company produced four full-length feature films. Nivelli himself wrote the script for his first film, Pathways of Life (German: Lebensbahnen), and played and sang the part as the opera singer.

The following year, he ended that partnership and formed "Nivo-Film & Co.", a new production company. He then teamed up with Austrian director Joseph Delmont to produce the films "The Outcasts" also known as "The Ritual Murder" (German: Die Geächteten; Der Ritualmord) and "Humanity Unleashed" (German: Die entfesselte Menschheit). These films were of social and political nature and became the most successful and well known films of his career.

Nivelli tended to work with the same director on more than one project. Apart from his work with Delmont, he also had a productive collaboration with Carl Boese, with whom he made four films, among them was "Nocturne of Love" (German: Nocturno der Liebe) which was based on the life of the Polish composer Frédéric Chopin. Nivelli also produced two films under the direction of Arthur Ullman and went on to produce the "Albani Series", three romantic films in a row, under the direction of Guido Schamberg Parisch and starring the Italian actress Marcella Albani.

== Later years ==
During the years of the economic crisis and hyperinflation in the Weimar Republic (1921–1924), Nivelli lost most of his fortune. He turned to other occupations related to the film industry, which included the import, export, distribution and rental of films, with partner Arthur Gregor. He also managed the cinema house "Lichtspiel Palmenhaus Kino" in Berlin and served on the board of directors of "Paw Film", a Polish production and distribution company located in Warsaw. Towards the end of that period, in 1924, Nivelli gradually resumed his role as film producer by making four short documentaries, depicting primarily state memorial ceremonies and celebrations.

In June 1925, he established a new production company "Nivelli Film Max Nivelli & Co.", with partner Dr. Sander Kaisermann. He immediately embarked on his next project, which was another social awareness film, titled "Unity, Justice and Freedom" (German: Einigkeit und Recht und Freiheit). This was his third project with the director Joseph Delmont and was based on his earlier film "Humanity Unleashed", using previously shot scenes. Just days before the filming ended, Max Nivelli died suddenly of a heart attack.

In the professional press he was described as brilliant, creative and dynamic and as a popular personality among the filmmakers in Berlin.

== Prominent Films ==
=== The Outcasts (Die Geächteten), also known as The Ritual Murder (Der Ritualmord) ===
This 1919 film was made with the intention of educating the public on the dangers of anti-Semitism in general and blood libel in particular and was marketed as an "enlightenment film" (Aufklärungsfilm). Following the end of World War I, Jewish immigration into Western Europe increased and a surge in anti-Semitism and xenophobia was felt all over Germany. The term "Jewish question" (die Judenfrage) became a popular topic in German society and the issue of intimate relations between Germans and Jews, which until then was considered a taboo, was also raised.

The film portrays a violent attack against Jews ("Pogrom") in a village in the Russian Empire, when rumors of a ritual murder spread following the disappearance of a little girl. According to the rumors, the murder was committed by the leader of the Jewish community. A Russian student, who is in love with the leader's daughter, prevents the mob from stoning him to death. When the girl is finally found safe and sound, the conspiracy to incriminate the Jews with a blood libel is exposed, but it comes too late for the leader's daughter, who is fatally wounded in one of the attacks. Her father and the student unite in their vow to fight against the prejudice which led to this tragedy.

The film's premiere was a glittering event attended by film critics from all major newspapers, as well as celebrities from the literary and artistic scene in Berlin. The screening was received with loud applause. Newspaper reviews described the film as "a masterpiece", "one of the best films to be produced so far" and as "a film where the hero is not a specific person but a whole nation". Max Nivelli was portrayed as the driving force of this project, by which "he succeeded in spreading his vision for enlightenment and the need to fight prejudice", and in that "he can be considered as one of the monumental film producers of his time". Within 6 weeks of the premiere, which at the time was considered a record, the film was sold worldwide and orders were already pouring in for his next planned project with Delmont - the film "Humanity Unleashed".

=== Humanity Unleashed (Die entfesselte Menschheit) ===
The film is an adaptation of a novel by the same name, written by Max Glass and published in 1919. In his novel, Glass described a dark world consumed by disease and war. The film makers decided to take the story to a more contemporary context and produced what was to become the first fictional account of the events of January 1919 in Berlin, the so-called "Spartacist Uprising". This film is also considered one of the anti-Bolshevik films of that era.

In the film, a group of workers starts a violent rebellion in an attempt to destroy the existing order, actions which almost lead to civil war. The film reflected the growing fear among the German public of political radicalization. This fear was not unfounded – while the film was still in production, there was another coup attempt ("Kapp Putsch"), this time by nationalist and monarchist factions. Reports in the press about the filming drew the attention of the government, sparking its concern about the effect the film might have on Germany's image abroad. The Foreign Office summoned Max Nivelli and asked him to allow their representative to view the film before its release. In June 1920, the film was approved by the censor but due to the sensitivity of the issue, "Nivo-Film" decided to wait.

The premiere was held six months later and was attended by public figures and members of the government. Most film critics declared the film a success. The film was described as "an important historic document", "one of the best films in recent years", "captivating and realistic". Some even praised the courage demonstrated by the makers of the film, who dared to examine such a sensitive issue while memories of recent events were still fresh in the public's mind. On the other hand, newspapers which represented socialist views, claimed that the workers were negatively portrayed and that the film's goal was to disseminate fear among the public. From an artistic viewpoint, it was considered a groundbreaking film – 17,000 people were involved in its production and it was said that "clear thematic direction, strong construction and emotional imagery give this film character and pace".

== Filmography ==
Year	Title (Ger.)	Title (Eng.)	Director	Category
1918	Lebensbahnen – Ein Sängerleben	Pathways of Life - Life of a Singer	Ernst Sachs	Feature
1918	Der Glückssucher	The Luck Seeker	Arthur Ullmann	Feature
1918	Die Gestohlene Seele	The Stolen Soul	Carl Boese	Feature
1918	Der Fluch des Nuri	The Curse of Nuri	Carl Boese	Feature
1918	Das Alte Bild	The Old Image	Arthur Ullmann	Feature
1919	Die Geächteten Alternate Name: Der Ritualmord	The Outcasts The Ritual Murder	Joseph Delmont	Feature
1919	Nocturno der Liebe Alternate Name: Chopin	Nocturne of Love Chopin	Carl Boese	Feature
1919	Die Tochter des Bajazzo Alternate Name: Das alte Lied	The Clown's Daughter / The Old Song	Arthur Ullmann	Feature
1920	Die entfesselte Menschheit	Humanity Unleashed	Joseph Delmont	Feature
1922	Dolores	Dolores	Carl Boese	Feature
1922	Frauenschicksal	Women's Fate	Guido Schamberg	Feature
1923	Das Spiel der Liebe	The Game of Love	Guido Schamberg	Feature
1923	Liebe und Ehe	Love and Marriage	Unknown	Feature
1923	Im Rausche der Leidenschaft	In the Heat of Passion	Guido Schamberg	Feature
1924	Die Samland-Bäder (Die ostpreußische Bernsteinküste)	The Samland Baths (The East-Prussian Amber coast)	Unknown	Short Documentary
1924	Die Tannenbergfeier in Königsberg	The Tannenberg Ceremony in Königsberg	Unknown	Short Documentary
1924	Die Verfassungsfeier in Berlin	The Constitution Ceremony in Berlin	Unknown	Short Documentary
1924	Die Ehrengedenkfeier für die Toten Helden	Memorial Ceremony for the Dead Heroes	Unknown	Short Documentary
1926	Einigkeit und Recht und Freiheit	Unity, Justice and Freedom	Joseph Delmont	Feature
