= Martin Luther (1923 film) =

1923 film

- Directed by: Karl Wüstenhagen
- Written by: Walter Nithack-Stahn; P. Kurz
- Starring: Karl Wüstenhagen; Dary Holm; Anton Walbrook; Wilhelm Diegelmann
- Cinematography: Ewald Daub
- Production company: Luther-Film
- Release date: 1923
- Country: Germany
- Languages: Silent; German intertitles

Martin Luther is a 1923 German silent historical film directed by Karl Wüstenhagen and starring Wüstenhagen, Dary Holm and Anton Walbrook. The film depicts the life of the 16th century Christian reformer Martin Luther. It was shot at historic sites in Erfurt and the Wartburg.

The film is still extant, but only through copies intended for distribution outside Germany.

== Partial cast ==
- Karl Wüstenhagen as Martin Luther
- Dary Holm
- Anton Walbrook
- Wilhelm Diegelmann
- Elise Aulinger
- Eugen Gura
- Viktor Gehring
- Rudolf Hoch
- Charlotte Krüger

== Bibliography ==
- Wipfler, Esther P. Martin Luther in Motion Pictures: History of a Metamorphosis. Vandenhoeck & Ruprecht, 2011.
