= List of West German films of 1951 =

List of films produced in Germany in 1951

The List of West German films of 1951. This was the second full year of film production since the formal partition of Germany into East and West in 1949.

== A–L ==
Title	Director	Cast	Genre	Notes
Bluebeard	Christian-Jaque	Hans Albers, Fritz Kortner, Cécile Aubry	Comedy	Co-production with France and Switzerland
Border Post 58	Harry Hasso	Hansi Knoteck, Mady Rahl, Elise Aulinger	Crime	
The Cloister of Martins	Richard Häussler	Willy Rösner, Gisela Fackeldey, Heinz Engelmann	Drama	
The Csardas Princess	Georg Jacoby	Marika Rökk, Johannes Heesters, Jeanette Schultze	Musical	
Czardas of Hearts	Sándor Szlatinay	Wolf Albach-Retty, Hannelore Bollmann, Dorit Kreysler	Comedy	
Dark Eyes	Géza von Bolváry	Cornell Borchers, Will Quadflieg, Angelika Hauff	Crime	
The Deadly Dreams	Paul Martin	Will Quadflieg, Cornell Borchers, Rudolf Forster	Drama	
Desire	Karl Georg Külb	Winnie Markus, Richard Häussler, Olga Tschechowa	Drama	
Dreaming Days	Emil-Edwin Reinert	Aglaja Schmid, O.W. Fischer, Axel von Ambesser	Drama	Co-production with France
Doctor Holl	Rolf Hansen	Maria Schell, Dieter Borsche, Heidemarie Hatheyer	Drama	
The Dubarry	Georg Wildhagen, Reinhold Schünzel	Sari Barabas, Willy Fritsch, Albert Lieven	Musical	
Eyes of Love	Alfred Braun	Käthe Gold, René Deltgen, Paul Wegener	Drama	Originally completed in 1944.
Fanfares of Love	Kurt Hoffmann	Dieter Borsche, Georg Thomalla, Inge Egger	Comedy	
Eine Frau mit Herz	Rudolf Jugert	Olga Chekhova, Rudolf Prack, Gustav Knuth	Comedy	
The Guilt of Doctor Homma	Paul Verhoeven	Werner Hinz, Ilse Steppat, Viktoria von Ballasko	Crime	
Hanna Amon	Veit Harlan	Kristina Söderbaum, Lutz Moik, Ilse Steppat	Drama	
Heart's Desire	Paul Martin	Hans Hotter, Rainer Penkert, Lola Müthel	Drama	
The Heath Is Green	Hans Deppe	Sonja Ziemann, Rudolf Prack, Willy Fritsch	Romance	
A Heidelberg Romance	Paul Verhoeven	Liselotte Pulver, O.W. Fischer, Gunnar Möller	Romance	
The House in Montevideo	Curt Goetz, Valérie von Martens	Curt Goetz, Valérie von Martens, Albert Florath	Comedy	
Immortal Beloved	Veit Harlan	Kristina Söderbaum, Hans Holt, Alexander Golling	Drama	
Immortal Light	Arthur Maria Rabenalt	Rudolf Forster, Cornell Borchers, Volker von Collande	Drama	
It Began at Midnight	Peter Paul Brauer	Winnie Markus, Albert Matterstock, Heli Finkenzeller	Crime comedy	
The Lady in Black	Erich Engels	Paul Hartmann, Mady Rahl, Rudolf Prack	Crime	
The Last Shot	Franz Seitz	Angelika Hauff, Viktor Staal, Heinrich Gretler	Drama	
The Lost One	Peter Lorre	Peter Lorre, Renate Mannhardt, Renate Mannhardt	Drama	

== M–Z ==
Title	Director	Cast	Genre	Notes
Maya of the Seven Veils	Géza von Cziffra	Maria Litto, Willy Fritsch, Grethe Weiser	Musical	
The Midnight Venus	Ferdinand Dörfler	Theo Lingen, Maria Andergast, Paul Kemp	Comedy	
Miracles Still Happen	Willi Forst	Hildegard Knef, Willi Forst, Marianne Wischmann	Romantic comedy	
My Friend the Thief	Helmut Weiss	Vera Molnár, Hardy Krüger, Hans Söhnker	Comedy	
Night on Mont Blanc	Harald Reinl	Dagmar Rom, Dietmar Schönherr, Geraldine Katt	Adventure	Co-production with Austria
Not Without Gisela	Hans Deppe	Peter Mosbacher, Eva Ingeborg Scholz, Hilde Sessak	Musical	
One Night's Intoxication	Eduard von Borsody	Christl Mardayn, Richard Häussler, Paul Dahlke	Comedy	
Professor Nachtfalter	Rolf Meyer	Johannes Heesters, Jeanette Schultze, Maria Litto	Comedy	
Queen of the Night	Kurt Hoffmann	Ilse Werner, Hans Holt, Georg Thomalla	Musical	
The Secret of a Marriage	Helmut Weiss	Olga Chekhova, Curd Jürgens, Paul Klinger	Comedy	
Sensation in San Remo	Georg Jacoby	Marika Rökk, Peter Pasetti, Ewald Balser	Musical	
The Sinful Border	Robert A. Stemmle	Dieter Borsche, Inge Egger, Peter Mosbacher	Crime	
The Sinner	Willi Forst	Hildegard Knef, Gustav Fröhlich, Wera Frydtberg	Drama	
Stips	Carl Froelich	Gustav Fröhlich, Heli Finkenzeller, Eva Ingeborg Scholz	Comedy	
The Tiger Akbar	Harry Piel	Harry Piel, Friedl Hardt, Hilde Hildebrand	Thriller	
Torreani	Gustav Fröhlich	René Deltgen, Inge Landgut, Gustav Fröhlich	Drama	
Veronika the Maid	Leopold Hainisch	Ilse Exl, Viktor Staal, Ilse Steppat	Drama	
Wedding in the Hay	Arthur Maria Rabenalt	Oskar Sima, Inge Egger, Kurt Seifert	Comedy	Co-production with Austria
When the Evening Bells Ring	Alfred Braun	Willy Birgel, Maria Holst, Paul Hörbiger	Drama	
White Shadows	Helmut Käutner	Hilde Krahl, Hans Söhnker, Claude Farell	Drama	
Wild West in Upper Bavaria	Ferdinand Dörfler	Joe Stöckel, Margarete Haagen, Renate Mannhardt	Comedy	
Woe to Him Who Loves	Sándor Szlatinay	Gretl Schörg, Wolf Albach-Retty, Hubert von Meyerinck	Comedy	
You Have to be Beautiful	Ákos Ráthonyi	Sonja Ziemann, Willy Fritsch, Anny Ondra	Musical comedy	

== Bibliography ==
- Davidson, John & Hake, Sabine. Framing the Fifties: Cinema in a Divided Germany. Berghahn Books, 2007.
- Fehrenbach, Heide. Cinema in Democratizing Germany: Reconstructing National Identity After Hitler. University of North Carolina Press, 1995.

== See also ==
- List of Austrian films of 1951
- List of East German films of 1951
