= List of German films of 1945–1949 =

This is a list of the most notable films produced in Cinema of Germany between 1945 and 1959.

For an alphabetical list of articles on West German films see Category:West German films.

Missing films may be Austrian productions.

== 1946 ==
Title	Director	Cast	Genre	Notes
Allez Hopp	Hans Fritz Köllner	Ernst Stahl-Nachbaur, Hilde Körber	Drama	
Die Fledermaus	Géza von Bolváry	Marte Harell, Johannes Heesters	Comedy	filmed before 1945
Free Land	Milo Harbich	Fritz Wagner, Herbert Wilk	Drama	
The Murderers Are Among Us	Wolfgang Staudte	Wilhelm Borchert, Hildegard Knef	Drama	
Peter Voss, Thief of Millions	Karl Anton	Viktor de Kowa, Else von Möllendorff	Comedy crime	filmed before 1945
Somewhere in Berlin	Gerhard Lamprecht	Mady Rahl, Rotraut Richter	Drama	
Tell the Truth	Helmut Weiss	Gustav Fröhlich, Mady Rahl	Comedy	
Under the Bridges	Helmut Käutner	Hannelore Schroth, Carl Raddatz	Drama	filmed before 1945

== 1947 ==
Title	Director	Cast	Genre	Notes
And the Heavens Above Us	Josef von Báky	Hans Albers, Lotte Koch, Annemarie Hase	Drama	
And If We Should Meet Again	Hans Müller	Paul Dahlke, Käthe Haack, Willi Rose	Drama	
Between Yesterday and Tomorrow	Harald Braun	Winnie Markus, Hildegard Knef, Sybille Schmitz	Drama	
Ghost in the Castle	Hans H. Zerlett	Margot Hielscher, Fritz Odemar, Sonja Ziemann	Comedy	
In Those Days	Helmut Käutner	Winnie Markus, Carl Raddatz, Erwin Geschonneck	Drama	
King of Hearts	Helmut Weiss	Hans Nielsen, Sonja Ziemann, Georg Thomalla	Comedy	
Marriage in the Shadows	Kurt Maetzig	Paul Klinger, Ilse Steppat, Claus Holm	Drama	
The Millionaire	Robert A. Stemmle	Hans Moser, Annie Rosar, Hans Holt	Comedy	
No Place for Love	Hans Deppe	Bruni Löbel, Heinz Lausch, Ernst Legal	Romance	
Quax in Africa	Helmut Weiss	Heinz Rühmann, Hertha Feiler, Karin Himboldt	Comedy	filmed before 1945
Raid	Werner Klingler	Paul Bildt, Agathe Poschmann Claus Holm	Crime	
Wozzeck	Georg C. Klaren	Kurt Meisel Paul Henckels, Arno Paulsen	Drama	

== 1948 ==
Title	Director	Cast	Genre	Notes
1-2-3 Corona	Hans Müller	Eva Ingeborg Scholz, Lutz Moik, Walter Werner	Drama	
An Everyday Story	Günther Rittau	Gustav Fröhlich, Marianne Simson, Karl Schönböck	Drama	
Anni	Max Neufeld	Elfie Mayerhofer, Siegfried Breuer, Josef Meinrad	Romance	Co-production with Austria
The Berliner	Robert A. Stemmle	Gert Fröbe, Tatjana Sais, Aribert Wäscher	Comedy	
Blocked Signals	Johannes Meyer	Heinz Engelmann, Wolfgang Lukschy, Walter Franck	Thriller	
Blum Affair	Erich Engel	Hans Christian Blech, Ernst Waldow, Karin Evans	Drama	
Chemistry and Love	Arthur Maria Rabenalt	Hans Nielsen, Tilly Lauenstein, Ralph Lothar	Comedy	
The Court Concert	Paul Verhoeven	Elfie Mayerhofer, Hans Nielsen, Erich Ponto	Musical	filmed before 1945
Everything Will Be Better in the Morning	Arthur Maria Rabenalt	Ellen Schwanneke, Jakob Tiedtke, Grethe Weiser	Comedy	
Film Without a Title	Rudolf Jugert	Hans Söhnker, Hildegard Knef, Willy Fritsch	Comedy	
Gaspary's Sons	Rolf Meyer	Lil Dagover, Hans Stüwe, Inge Landgut	Drama	
Germany, Year Zero	Roberto Rossellini	Ernst Pittschau, Franz-Otto Krüger	Drama	Co-production with Italy
Insolent and in Love	Hans Schweikart	Johannes Heesters, Charlott Daudert, Gabriele Reismüller	Comedy	
In the Temple of Venus	Hans H. Zerlett	Olga Chekhova, Willy Birgel, Olly Holzmann	Drama	
Journey to Happiness	Erich Engel	Käthe Dorsch, Rudolf Forster, Hildegard Knef	Drama	Filmed in 1944
Long Is the Road	Herbert B. Fredersdorf	Bettina Moissi, Otto Wernicke, Paul Dahlke	Drama	
The Lost Face	Kurt Hoffmann	Marianne Hoppe, Gustav Fröhlich, Richard Häussler	Drama	
The Morgenrot Mine	Wolfgang Schleif	Claus Holm, Gisela Trowe, Hans Klering	Drama	
Morituri	Eugen York	Lotte Koch, Winnie Markus, Walter Richter	War drama	
Nora's Ark	Werner Klingler	Willy Maertens, Harry Meyen, Hans Billian	Drama	
The Original Sin	Helmut Käutner	Bettina Moissi, Bobby Todd, Arno Assmann	Comedy	
Paths in Twilight	Gustav Fröhlich	Gustav Fröhlich, Sonja Ziemann, Benno Sterzenbach	Drama	
Street Acquaintances	Peter Pewas	Gisela Trowe, Alice Treff, Harry Hindemith	Drama	
Thank You, I'm Fine	Erich Waschneck	Ernst von Klipstein, Karin Hardt, Sonja Ziemann	Comedy	
The Time with You	George Hurdalek	Eva Ingeborg Scholz, Heinz Klingenberg, Gisela Trowe	Drama	

== 1949 ==
Title	Director	Cast	Genre	Notes
After the Rain Comes Sunshine	Erich Kobler	Sonja Ziemann, Gert Fröbe, Rudolf Platte	Comedy	
Amico	Gerhard T. Buchholz	Otto Wernicke, Kirsten Heiberg, Margarete Haagen	Comedy	
Anonymous Letters	Arthur Maria Rabenalt	Käthe Haack, Tilly Lauenstein, O.E. Hasse	Drama	
The Appeal to Conscience	Karl Anton	Karl Ludwig Diehl, Werner Hinz, Gustav Diessl	Mystery	
Artists' Blood	Wolfgang Wehrum	Hans Richter, Dorit Kreysler, Karin Jacobsen	Comedy	
The Blue Straw Hat	Viktor Tourjansky	Margot Hielscher, Karl Schönböck, Mady Rahl	Comedy	
By a Nose	E.W. Emo	Theo Lingen, Hans Moser, Sonja Ziemann	Comedy	
The Cuckoos	Hans Deppe	Ina Halley, Rainer Penkert, Carsta Löck	Comedy drama	
Dangerous Guests	Géza von Cziffra	Wolf Albach-Retty, Vera Molnár, Paul Kemp	Comedy	
Derby	Roger von Norman	Hannelore Schroth, Willy Fritsch, Heinz Engelmann	Sports	
Don't Play with Love	Hans Deppe	Lil Dagover, Bruni Löbel, Paul Klinger	Comedy	
Encounter with Werther	Karl Heinz Stroux	Horst Caspar, Heidemarie Hatheyer, Paul Klinger	Drama	
Friday the Thirteenth	Erich Engels	Fritz Kampers, Angelika Hauff, Fita Benkhoff	Comedy crime	
Girls Behind Bars	Alfred Braun	Petra Peters, Richard Häussler	Drama	
The Great Mandarin	Karl Heinz Stroux	Paul Wegener, Carsta Löck, Käthe Haack	Comedy	
A Heart Beats for You	Joe Stöckel	Rudolf Prack, Annelies Reinhold	Romance	
Hello, Fraulein!	Rudolf Jugert	Peter van Eyck, Hans Söhnker, Margot Hielscher	Musical	
How Do We Tell Our Children?	Hans Deppe	Leny Marenbach, Mathias Wieman	Comedy	
I'll Make You Happy	Sándor Szlatinay	Heinz Rühmann, Hertha Feiler, Dorit Kreysler	Comedy	
I'll Never Forget That Night	Johannes Meyer	Gustav Fröhlich, Winnie Markus	Comedy	
Keepers of the Night	Harald Braun	Luise Ullrich, Hans Nielsen, René Deltgen, Dieter Borsche	Drama	
The Last Illusion	Josef von Báky	Fritz Kortner, Johanna Hofer	Drama	
The Last Night	Eugen York	Sybille Schmitz, Karl John	Drama	
Law of Love	Hans Schweikart	Hilde Krahl, Paul Hubschmid, Ferdinand Marian	Historical drama	Filmed before 1945
Love '47	Wolfgang Liebeneiner	Hilde Krahl, Karl John, Grethe Weiser, Erich Ponto	Drama	
Madonna in Chains	Gerhard Lamprecht	Lotte Koch, Karin Hardt	Drama	
Martina	Arthur Maria Rabenalt	Jeanette Schultze, Cornell Borchers	Drama	
Mountain Crystal	Harald Reinl	Franz Eichberger, Hans Renz	Drama	a.k.a. Rock Crystal. Co-production with Austria
The Murder Trial of Doctor Jordan	Erich Engels	Rudolf Fernau, Maria Holst	Crime	
My Wife's Friends	Hans Deppe	Sonja Ziemann, Grethe Weiser, Gerda Maurus	Comedy	
Night of the Twelve	Hans Schweikart	Rudolf Fernau, Ferdinand Marian	Crime	
Nights on the Nile	Arthur Maria Rabenalt	Sonja Ziemann, Wolfgang Lukschy	Musical comedy	
Nothing But Coincidence	E. W. Emo	Theo Lingen, Sonja Ziemann	Comedy	
The Prisoner	Gustav Fröhlich	Paul Dahlke, Richard Häussler	Adventure	
Search for Majora	Hermann Pfeiffer	Lotte Koch, Camilla Horn	Crime	
Second Hand Destiny	Wolfgang Staudte	Erich Ponto, Marianne Hoppe	Drama	
The Secret of the Red Cat	Helmut Weiss	Heinz Rühmann, Gustav Knuth, Angelika Hauff	Comedy crime	
The Trip to Marrakesh	Richard Eichberg	Luise Ullrich, Maria Holst	Drama	
Tromba	Helmut Weiss	René Deltgen, Angelika Hauff, Gustav Knuth, Grethe Weiser	Crime	
Trouble Backstairs	Erich Kobler	Paul Dahlke, Fita Benkhoff	Comedy	
Twelve Hearts for Charly	Fritz Andelfinger, Elly Rauch	Willy Fritsch, Heli Finkenzeller	Musical comedy	
Where the Trains Go	Boleslaw Barlog	Heidemarie Hatheyer, Carl Raddatz, Gunnar Möller	Drama	
