= Überläufer =

Hybrid Nazi/postwar German film

In German film history, an Überläufer (lit. defector) is a film that was in production under the Third Reich but completed or premiered only after the end of the Second World War. The vast majority of Überläufer films are romantic comedies with no reference to the political and military situation of the time.

== Completed shortly before the end of the war ==
- Eyes of Love (dir. Alfred Braun)
- Friday the Thirteenth (dir. Erich Engels)
- Ghost in the Castle (dir. Hans H. Zerlett)
- How Do We Tell Our Children? (dir. Hans Deppe)
- In the Temple of Venus (dir. Hans H. Zerlett)
- Insolent and in Love (dir. Hans Schweikart)
- Law of Love (dir. Hans Schweikart)
- Melusine (dir. Hans Steinhoff), released 2014
- Quax in Africa (dir. Helmut Weiss)
- Under the Bridges (dir. Helmut Käutner)

== Completed after the end of the war ==
- The Appeal to Conscience (dir. Karl Anton)
- The Court Concert (dir. Paul Verhoeven)
- An Everyday Story (dir. Günther Rittau)
- Die Fledermaus (dir. Géza von Bolváry)
- A Heart Beats for You (dir. Joe Stöckel)
- The Man in the Saddle (dir. Harry Piel), released 2000
- Night of the Twelve (dir. Hans Schweikart)
- Peter Voss, Thief of Millions (dir. Karl Anton)
- Thank You, I'm Fine (dir. Erich Waschneck)
- Tiefland (dir. Leni Riefenstahl)
- Ulli and Marei (dir. Leopold Hainisch)
- Viennese Girls (dir. Willi Forst)

== See also ==
- Nazism and cinema
- List of German films of 1933–45
