= Angelika Hauff =

Austrian actress

- Born: 15 December 1922; Vienna, Austria
- Died: 3 December 1983 (aged 60); Vienna, Austria
- Other name: Alice Paula Marie Suchanek
- Occupation: Actress
- Years active: 1943 - 1980 (film)

Angelika Hauff (15 December 1922–3 December 1983) was an Austrian stage and film actress. She worked prolifically as a film actress in the immediate aftermath of the Second World War, appearing in the lead roles in several successful films that included The Marriage of Figaro and Dark Eyes (1951). A versatile actor, she appeared in a variety of cinematic genres in Germany and Austria and attained international recognition in French, English and Italian films. She was a preeminent stage actress with the prestigious Vienna Burgtheatre, portraying classic German language roles and being awarded the highest acting honours.

== Biography ==
Hauff was born Alice Paula Marie Suchanek in Vienna on December 15, 1922. In her youth she was an aspiring ballet dancer at the Vienna State Opera. She studied Drama at the Max Reinhardt Seminar (Reinhardt Seminar) now part of the University of Music and Performing Arts Vienna. In 1942 she began her professional career with an engagement at the Salzburg State Theatre.

Her film career was an immediate success. She had a debut minor role in Herbert Maisch's Music in Salzburg followed in 1943 by her first major role as Bettina Altoff in Arthur Rabenhalt's escapist circus film Zirkus Renz. Throughout the late 1940s through to the early '60s she was in constant demand as a screen actor appearing in numerous Austrian and German films. Hauff made four further films before the end of the Second World War and in its aftermath she appeared in films made in both parts of Germany. She starred opposite heartthrob Rudolf Prack in the Austrian romance The Queen of the Landstrasse in 1948. In 1949 in the DDR she starred as the femme fatale Susanna in a film adaptation of The Marriage of Figaro. In constant demand she then appeared as with René Deltgen in another circus film, Helmut Weiss' Tiger Man, one of West Germany's most successful films of the immediate post war period.

Other lauded roles included that of Roszi in the German crime thriller Dark Eyes where she shared top billing with Cornell Borchers and Will Quadflieg. In Italy, she appeared in the 1953 Italian language comedy Martin Toccaferro directed by Leonardo De Mitri. As the 1950s progressed she played fewer lead roles but remained in constant demand in supporting roles such as Tänzerin Anni Wührer in the 1953 remake of The Emperor Waltz set in the fading days of the Austrian Empire. Other supporting roles include St Croix in Eugen York's Das Fräulein von Scuderi (1955) and in Karl Hartl's The Life and Loves of Mozart where she played Suzi Geri.

In the following decades, Hauff's stage work became a priority. In 1955 until her death in 1983 she was a member of the prestigious Vienna Burgtheatre an institution of cultural importance to German speakers similar to the role the Shakespeare Company has in English speaking theatre. The Burgtheatre had an established tradition as a visiting company and Hauff toured through Germany and Austria, playing roles at the Schiller Theatre in Berlin and the Munich Kammerspiele. Shortly before her death she was awarded the honorary title Kammertressin in recognition of preeminence at the Burgtheatre.

In the late 1970s she returned to the screen as the mother of Olivia Pascal in the French comedy Arrête ton char... bidasse! directed by Michel Gérard. In one of her last film roles she played the outraged mother of Austrian artist Egon Schiele in Herbert Vesely's international co-production Egon Schiele – Exzess und Bestrafung.

Hauff died aged sixty years after a short illness on 3 December 1983.

== Partial filmography ==
- Circus Renz (1943) - Bettina Althoff
- Music in Salzburg (1943)
- Melusine (1944) - Christine von Hardegg
- Wir beide liebten Katharina (1945) - Katharina
- The Queen of the Landstrasse (1948) - Flora Giebel genannt "Lulu"
- The Secret of the Red Cat (1949) - Gloria
- Tromba (1949) - Ola Orlando, Trapezkünstlerin
- Friday the Thirteenth (1949) - Irene
- The Marriage of Figaro (1949) - Susanna
- Dr. Semmelweis (1950) - Steffi Lanthaler
- The Girl from the South Seas (1950) - Lale Pieper
- The Allure of Danger (1950) - Tessy
- The Goddess of Rio Beni (1950) - Elisa
- The Last Shot (1951) - Hanni Manhard
- Dark Eyes (1951) - Roszi
- Road to Home (1952) - Fanny Moser
- A Very Big Child (1952) - Ina Cornelius
- The Forester's Daughter (1952) - Ilona
- Fräulein Casanova (1953) - Raffaela
- The Emperor Waltz (1953) - Tänzerin Anni Wührer
- Martin Toccaferro (1953) - Marilu Costanzi
- Fatalidade (1953)
- Der Komödiant von Wien (1954) - Helene Odilon
- Chamas no cafezal (1954)
- The Phantom of the Big Tent (1954) - Lolita, seine Tochter, Kunstreiterin
- Das Fräulein von Scuderi (1955) - St, Croix
- Silence in the Forest (1955) - Baronin Edith von Prankha
- Mozart (1955) - Suzi Gerl
- Bademeister Spargel (1956) - Margot
- Das Liebesleben des schönen Franz (1956) - Mausi, Hackers Freundin
- The Shepherd from Trutzberg (1959) - Pernella - Magd auf Puechstein
- Arrête ton char... bidasse! (1977) - La mère de Maria
- Egon Schiele – Exzess und Bestrafung (1980) - Schiele's mother (final film role)

== Bibliography ==
- Goble, Alan. The Complete Index to Literary Sources in Film. Walter de Gruyter, 1999.
- Kay Weniger: Das große Personenlexikon des Films. Dritter Band F – H. Barry Fitzgerald – Ernst Hofbauer, Schwarzkopf & Schwarzkopf Verlag, Berlin 2001, ISBN 3-89602-340-3, S. 574 f.
