= Heimat Bells =

1952 film

- Directed by: Hermann Kugelstadt
- Written by: Johannes Kai; Hermann Kugelstadt
- Starring: Hansi Knoteck; Armin Dahlen; Ernst Waldow; Renate Mannhardt
- Cinematography: Bertl Höcht; Heinz Schnackertz
- Edited by: Max Michel
- Music by: Werner Bochmann
- Production company: König Film
- Distributed by: Kopp-Filmverleih
- Release date: 17 October 1952
- Running time: 95 minutes
- Country: West Germany
- Language: German

Heimat Bells (German: Heimatglocken) is a 1952 West German drama film directed by Hermann Kugelstadt and starring Hansi Knoteck, Armin Dahlen and Ernst Waldow. It was shot at the Bavaria Studios in Munich and on location in Mittenwald in the Bavarian Alps. The film's sets were designed by the art director Max Seefelder.

== Cast ==
- Hansi Knoteck as Maria
- Armin Dahlen as Mathias Brucker

and in alphabetical order

- Siegfried Andree
- Mathias Brucker
- Karl Heinz Diess
- Jenny Dreher
- Albert Florath as Lehrer
- Ulrich Folkmar
- Franz Fröhlich
- Gustl Gstettenbaur
- Olly Gubo
- Wolfgang Keppler
- Anderl Kern
- Auguste Kleinmichl
- Ruth Lommel as Kitty Meier
- Franz Loskarn
- Renate Mannhardt as Zenzi
- Franz Muxeneder as Leo Stanzer
- Sepp Nigg
- Martin Schmidhofer
- Bertl Schultes
- Inge Schulz
- Uli Steigberg
- Gerhard Steinberg
- Rolf Straub
- Kathi Tellheim
- Karl Tischlinger
- Hermann van Dyk
- Alice Verden
- Georg Vogelsang
- Ernst Waldow as Felix Meier
- Mathias Wenzel

== Bibliography ==
- Pugh, Emily. The Berlin Wall and the Urban Space and Experience of East and West Berlin, 1961–1989. ProQuest, 2008.
