= Operation Edelweiss (film) =

1954 film

- Directed by: Heinz Paul
- Written by: Hans Gustl Kernmayr; Heinz Paul
- Produced by: Christoph von Mitschke-Collande; Heinz Paul
- Starring: Joachim Mock; Albert Hehn; Wolf Petersen
- Cinematography: Franz Weihmayr
- Edited by: Ludolf Grisebach
- Music by: Norbert Schultze
- Production company: H.P. Filmproduktion
- Distributed by: Deutsche London-Film
- Release date: 9 November 1954
- Running time: 93 minutes
- Country: West Germany
- Language: German

Operation Edelweiss (German: Unternehmen Edelweiß) is a 1954 West German war film directed by Heinz Paul and starring Joachim Mock, Albert Hehn and Wolf Petersen. It was shot at the Göttingen Studios and on location in Switzerland. The film's sets were designed by the art directors Hans Kuhnert and Theo Zwierski.

== Cast ==
- Joachim Mock as Friederich
- Albert Hehn as Stefan Hallweger
- Wolf Petersen as Adelbert
- Walter Ladengast as Ignatz
- Jochen Blume as Paul Hübner
- Werner Werndorff as Werner Lobisser
- Gustl Gstettenbaur as Hardei
- Reinhard Kolldehoff as Erich
- Franz Muxeneder as Melchior
- Sepp Rist as Magnus Rasmussen
- Alice Graf as Silke Rasmussen
- Rolf von Nauckhoff as Eike Rasmussen
- Otto Reinwald

== Bibliography ==
- Goble, Alan. The Complete Index to Literary Sources in Film. Walter de Gruyter, 1999.*
