= Silence in the Forest (1955 film) =

1955 film

- Directed by: Helmut Weiss
- Written by: Peter Ostermayr; Helmut Weiss
- Based on: Silent in the Forst by Ludwig Ganghofer
- Produced by: Ottmar Ostermayr
- Starring: Rudolf Lenz; Sonja Sutter; Angelika Hauff
- Cinematography: Franz Koch
- Edited by: Claus von Boro
- Music by: Giuseppe Becce
- Production company: Peter Ostermayr Produktion
- Release date: 5 September 1955
- Running time: 90 minutes
- Country: West Germany
- Language: German

Silence in the Forest (German: Das Schweigen im Walde) is a 1955 West German drama film directed by Helmut Weiss and starring Rudolf Lenz, Sonja Sutter and Angelika Hauff. It was shot at the Bavaria Studios in Munich and on location around the city including the Hintersee and Sella Pass. The film's sets were designed by the art directors Carl Ludwig Kirmse and Willi Horn. It is based on the 1899 novel of the same title by Ludwig Ganghofer which has been made into films on a number of occasions including a previous 1937 film adaptation.

== Cast ==
- Rudolf Lenz as Fürst Heinz von Ettingen
- Sonja Sutter as Lo Petri
- Angelika Hauff as Baronin Edith von Prankha
- Paul Richter as Kersten
- Ulrich Beiger as Diener Martin
- Käthe Haack as Frau Petri
- Heinz Christian as Gustl Petri
- Gustl Gstettenbaur as Beppi Braxlmaler
- Peter Arens as Toni Mazegger
- Georg Bauer
- Gustl Datz
- Willy Friedrichs
- Heinrich Hauser
- Karl Peter Holzmüller
- Walter Janssen
- Ruth Kappelsberger
- Sybille Kaspar
- Hermann Kellein
- Franz Loskarn
- Rolf Pinegger
- Alfons Schmidseder
- Inge von Neurath

== Bibliography ==
- Goble, Alan. The Complete Index to Literary Sources in Film. Walter de Gruyter, 1999.
