= Georg Vogelsang =

German actor (1883–1952)

- Born: 15 May 1883; Munich, Bavaria, German Empire
- Died: 21 December 1952 (aged 69); Schliersee, Bavaria, West Germany
- Occupation: Actor
- Years active: 1917–1952 (film)

Georg Vogelsang (1883–1952) was a German stage and film actor. He specialised in Bavarian character parts.

== Selected filmography ==
- The Secret of Castle Elmshoh (1925)
- Three Fathers for Anna (1939)
- The Eternal Spring (1940)
- The Vulture Wally (1940)
- Quax the Crash Pilot (1941)
- Lightning Around Barbara (1941)
- Sky Hounds (1942)
- The War of the Oxen (1943)
- Gabriele Dambrone (1943)
- The Eternal Tone (1943)
- Die Feuerzangenbowle (1944)
- The Wedding Hotel (1944)
- Orient Express (1944)
- Via Mala (1945)
- Quax in Africa (1947)
- The Secret of the Red Cat (1949)
- Royal Children (1950)
- King for One Night (1950)
- Who Is This That I Love? (1950)
- The Last Shot (1951)
- One Night's Intoxication (1951)
- Border Post 58 (1951)
- Heimat Bells (1952)
- Two People (1952)

== Bibliography ==
- Giesen, Rolf. Nazi Propaganda Films: A History and Filmography. McFarland & Company, 2003.
