= Tromba (film) =

1949 film by Helmut Weiss

- Theatrical release poster
- Directed by: Helmut Weiss
- Written by: Elisabeth Zimmermann; Helmut Weiss
- Produced by: Georg Richter
- Starring: René Deltgen; Angelika Hauff; Gustav Knuth; Hilde Weissner
- Cinematography: Werner Krien
- Edited by: Luise Dreyer-Sachsenberg
- Music by: Adolf Steimel
- Production companies: Camera-Filmproduktion; Titanus Film
- Distributed by: Norddeutscher Film
- Release date: 1 July 1949 (West Germany)
- Running time: 96 minutes
- Countries: Italy; West Germany
- Language: German

Tromba is a 1949 thriller film co-written and directed by Helmut Weiss and starring René Deltgen, Angelika Hauff and Gustav Knuth. It is a circus film with elements of film noir. It was one of the most popular West German films of the year, suggesting audiences appreciated a shift away from rubble films. It was made at the Bavaria Studios in Munich with sets designed by art director Ernst H. Albrecht. The film was released in the United States in 1952 as Tromba: the Tiger Man by Lippert Pictures.

== Cast ==
- René Deltgen as Kurt Tromba, Tigerdompteur
- Angelika Hauff as Ola Orlando, Trapezkünstlerin
- Gustav Knuth as Ernesto Spadoli, Artist
- Hilde Weissner as Teresa Kronbeck, Zirkusdirektorin
- Gardy Granass as Gardy Kronbeck, Sportstudentin
- Grethe Weiser as Cläre Vets, ehemalige Schulreiterin
- Adrian Hoven as Rudy Walheim, Sportstudent
- Carl Wery as Eric Jensen, Zirkusregisseur
- Hans Böhme as Olaf Orlando, Artist
- Dieter von der Recke as Alfons Orlando, Artist
- Jürgen Richter as Andy Orlando
