= Theo Zwierski =

German art director

- Born: 21 December 1911; Berlin, German Empire
- Died: 30 January 1989 (aged 77); Ober-Olm, Rhineland-Palatinate, West Germany
- Occupation: Art director
- Years active: 1941–1963 (film)

Theo Zwierski (1911–1989) was a German art director who designed the sets on a number of West German films and television productions.

== Selected filmography ==
- Uncle Kruger (1941)
- After the Rain Comes Sunshine (1949)
- The Girl from the South Seas (1950)
- Das gestohlene Jahr (1951)
- Falschmünzer am Werk (1951)
- Salto Mortale (1953)
- Man on a Tightrope (1953)
- Carnival Story (1954)
- Ten on Every Finger (1954)
- The Phantom of the Big Tent (1954)
- Operation Edelweiss (1954)
- Night People (1954)
- Circus of Love (1954)
- Love's Carnival (1955)
- Von der Liebe besiegt (1956)
- The Legs of Dolores (1957)
- Mein ganzes Herz ist voll Musik (1959)
- A Doctor of Conviction (1959)

== Bibliography ==
- Fritsche, Maria. Homemade Men In Postwar Austrian Cinema: Nationhood, Genre and Masculinity . Berghahn Books, 2013.
- Meier, Gustav. Filmstadt Göttingen: Bilder für eine neue Welt? : zur Geschichte der Göttinger Spielfilmproduktion 1945 bis 1961. Reichold, 1996.
