= The Goddess of Rio Beni =

1950 film directed by Franz Eichhorn

- Directed by: Franz Eichhorn
- Written by: Al O'Camp; Franz Eichhorn; O.A. Bayer
- Produced by: O.A. Bayer
- Starring: Angelika Hauff; Helmuth Schneider; America Cabral
- Cinematography: Edgar Eichhorn
- Edited by: Rudolph Brent; José Cañizares
- Music by: George Andreani; Walter Schultz Porto Alegre; Emil Velazco
- Production companies: Astra Films; Constantin Film
- Distributed by: J. Arthur Rank Film
- Release date: 13 December 1950
- Running time: 86 minutes
- Countries: West Germany; Brazil
- Language: German

The Goddess of Rio Beni (German: Die Göttin vom Rio Beni, Brazilian: Mundo Estranho) is a 1950 West German-Brazilian adventure film directed by Franz Eichhorn and starring Angelika Hauff, Helmuth Schneider and America Cabral.

== Cast ==
- Angelika Hauff as Elisa
- Helmuth Schneider as Edgar
- America Cabral as Father
- Carmen Brown as Dancer
- Kumatzaikuma as Indian Chief
- Ary Jartul as Ary
- Grijo Sobrinho as Innkeeper
- Walter Hardt as Publisher
- Antonio Cursati
- Hermann Geiger-Torel as Caranza
- Nicolai Jartulary
- Jaime Marini
- Lalo Maura
- Juan Pecci
- Linda Rodrigues
- Jesus Ruas
- José Ruzzo
- Amalia Sánchez Ariño
- Bogusław Samborski

== See also ==
- Golden Goddess of Rio Beni (1964)

== Bibliography ==
- David Kerekes & David Slater. Killing for Culture. Creation Books, 1995.
