= Max Michel (director) =

German actor, film director (1910–1988)

- Born: 17 February 1910; Munich, Bavaria, German Empire
- Died: May 1988 (aged 78)
- Occupations: Actor, director, editor
- Years active: 1933–1965 (film & TV)

Max Michel (1910–1988) was a German actor, film editor and film director. During the 1930s he appeared in a number of French films.

== Selected filmography ==
- Ein Kuß in der Sommernacht (1933)
- Between Heaven and Earth (1934)
- Lucrezia Borgia (1935)
- Passé à vendre (1936)
- La chanson du souvenir (1936)
- The Unsuspecting Angel (1936)
- The New Men (1936)
- Le tigre du Bengale (1938)
- Le tombeau hindou (1938)
- L'accroche-coeur (1938)
- La Loi du Nord (1939)
- The Singing Fool (1939)
- This Man in Paris (1939)
- Der Herr vom andern Stern (1948)
- Die kupferne Hochzeit (1948)
- One Night's Intoxication (1951)
- Wedding Bells (1954)
- Heimat Bells (1952)
- The Village Under the Sky (1953)
- Your Heart Is My Homeland (1953)
- The Blacksmith of St. Bartholomae (1955)
- Das Hirtenlied vom Kaisertal (1956)
- In Hamburg When the Nights Are Long (1956)
- Die Gejagten (1961)

== Bibliography ==
- Giesen, Rolf. Nazi Propaganda Films: A History and Filmography. McFarland, 2003.
- Goble, Alan. The Complete Index to Literary Sources in Film. Walter de Gruyter, 1999.
