= Three Wonderful Days =

- Directed by: Fritz Kirchhoff
- Written by: Curt J. Braun
- Starring: Gustav Waldau; Gina Falckenberg; Hans Zesch-Ballot
- Cinematography: Erich Claunigk
- Music by: Hans Carste
- Production company: Bavaria Film
- Distributed by: Bavaria Film
- Release date: 27 January 1939
- Running time: 80 minutes
- Country: Germany
- Language: German

Three Wonderful Days (German: Drei wunderschöne Tage) is a 1939 German drama film directed by Fritz Kirchhoff and starring Gustav Waldau, Gina Falckenberg and Hans Zesch-Ballot.

== Cast ==
- Gustav Waldau
- Gina Falckenberg
- Hans Zesch-Ballot
- Walter Janssen
- Anni Markart
- Werner Scharf
- Willem Holsboer
- Gundel Thormann
- Josef Eichheim
- Elise Aulinger
- Hans Richter
- Otto Wernicke
- Albert Janschek
- Herbert Hübner
- O.E. Hasse
- Maria Pierenkaemper
- Maria Stadler
- Hans Schulz
- Fritz Reiff
- Julius Riedmueller
- Adolf Lallinger
- Eva Schmid-Kayser
- Ina Albrecht
- Josef Berger
- Eduard Mathes-Roeckel
- Walter Hillbring
- Erika Stauffenberg

== Bibliography ==
- Parish, James Robert. Film Actors Guide. Scarecrow Press, 1977.
