= The Shepherd from Trutzberg =

1959 film

- Directed by: Eduard von Borsody
- Written by: Ludwig Ganghofer (novel); Peter Ostermayr
- Produced by: Peter Ostermayr; Dietrich von Theobald
- Starring: Heidi Brühl; Hans von Borsody; Franziska Kinz
- Cinematography: Franz Koch
- Edited by: Hilwa von Boro
- Music by: Giuseppe Becce
- Production company: Peter Ostermayr Produktion
- Distributed by: Bavaria Film
- Release date: 16 January 1959
- Running time: 96 minutes
- Country: West Germany
- Language: German

The Shepherd from Trutzberg (German: Der Schäfer vom Trutzberg) is a 1959 West German historical romance film directed by Eduard von Borsody and starring Heidi Brühl, Hans von Borsody and Franziska Kinz. It is a heimatfilm, based on a novel by Ludwig Ganghofer.

It was shot at the Bavaria Studios in Munich. The film's sets were designed by the art director Carl Ludwig Kirmse.

== Cast ==
- Heidi Brühl as Hilda von Puechstein
- Hans von Borsody as Lienhard
- Franziska Kinz as Angela von Trutzberg
- Karl Skraup as Melchior von Trutzberg
- Ulrich Beiger as Heini von Seeburg
- Anton Färber as Parlamentär der Seeburger
- Angelika Hauff as Pernella - Magd auf Puechstein
- Paul Richter as Herzog Albrecht von Bayern
- Walter Sedlmayr as Eberhard von Trutzberg
- Josef Sieber as Kassian Ziegenspoek - Sergeant
- Hans Stadtmüller as Eberhards Reitknecht
- Herbert Tiede as Korbin von Puechstein
- Elisabeth Wischert as Scholastika von Puechstein

== See also ==
- Die Trutze von Trutzberg (1922)

== Bibliography ==
- Bock, Hans-Michael; Bergfelder, Tim, eds. (2009). The Concise Cinegraph: Encyclopaedia of German Cinema. New York: Berghahn Books. ISBN 978-1-57181-655-9.
