= The Phantom of the Big Tent =

1954 film

- Theatrical release poster
- Directed by: Paul May
- Written by: Egon Eis; Walter F. Fichelscher
- Produced by: Friedrich Wilhelm Gaik
- Starring: René Deltgen; Angelika Hauff; Ilse Steppat
- Cinematography: Georg Krause
- Edited by: Hilde E. Grabow
- Music by: Rolf A. Wilhelm
- Production company: Algefa Film
- Distributed by: Columbia Film
- Release date: 21 December 1954
- Running time: 100 minutes
- Country: West Germany
- Language: German

The Phantom of the Big Tent (German: Phantom des großen Zeltes) is a 1954 West German thriller film directed by Paul May and starring René Deltgen, Angelika Hauff and Ilse Steppat. It was shot at the Spandau Studios in Berlin, with location filming taking place at a circus in Spandau. The film's sets were designed by the art directors Hans Kuhnert and Theo Zwierski.

== Cast ==
- René Deltgen as Alfredo Capelli, der Direktor
- Angelika Hauff as Lolita, seine Tochter, Kunstreiterin
  - Heidi Becker as Lolita, called Lilly, 10 years old
- Ilse Steppat as Dolores, Frau mit dem Löwen
- Armin Dahlen as Lal Singh, Mann mit dem Elefanten
- Hans Christian Blech as Naso, Clown mit Puppe
- Roma Bahn as Eine Zirkusbesucherin
- Evelyn Cormand as Germaine LaRue, Königin der Luft
- Al Hoosmann as Bonga, der Löwenwärter
- Wolfgang Müller
- Wolfgang Neuss
- Charles Regnier
- Hans Stiebner as Brazzini, Polizeiinspektor
- Howard Vernon as Armand LaRue, König der Luft
- Helmut von Hofe as Kapitän Nemo, der Todesfahrer
- Fritz Wagner
- Ralf Wolter as Motta, Geschäftsführer

== Bibliography ==
- Bock, Hans-Michael & Bergfelder, Tim. The Concise CineGraph. Encyclopedia of German Cinema. Berghahn Books, 2009.
