= The Secret of Castle Elmshoh =

1925 film

- Directed by: Max Obal
- Starring: Ernst Reicher; Gertrud de Lalsky; Anton Walbrook
- Cinematography: Karl Attenberger
- Production company: Münchner Lichtspielkunst
- Distributed by: Bavaria Film
- Release date: 1 April 1925
- Running time: 82 minutes
- Country: Germany
- Languages: Silent; German intertitles

The Secret of Castle Elmshoh (German: Das Geheimnis von Schloß Elmshöh) is a 1925 German silent mystery crime film directed by Max Obal and starring Ernst Reicher, Gertrud de Lalsky and Anton Walbrook. It was made at the Emelka Studios in Munich. The film's sets were designed by the art director Max Heilbronner. It is part of a long-running series featuring the detective Stuart Webbs.

== Synopsis ==
After a burglary at Castle Elmshoh, the private detective Stuart Webbs is called in to investigate. Clearing up the theft turns out be relatively straightforward but in the process he uncovers a more serious crime committed in order to secure the inheritance of the estate.

== Cast ==
- Ernst Reicher as Stuart Webbs
- Gertrud de Lalsky as Gräfin
- Anton Walbrook as Ihr Sohn Axel
- Georg Vogelsang as Georg
- Hermann Nesselträger as Großvater
- Hermann Picha as Pfarrer
- Ruth Weyher

== Bibliography ==
- Bock, Hans-Michael & Bergfelder, Tim. The Concise Cinegraph: Encyclopaedia of German Cinema. Berghahn Books, 2009.
