= The Blacksmith of St. Bartholomae =

1955 film

- Directed by: Max Michel
- Written by: Hanns Beck-Gaden; Karl Heinz Busse; Hans Prechtl
- Produced by: Hans Engelmann
- Starring: Viktor Staal; Marianne Koch; Annie Rosar
- Cinematography: Klaus von Rautenfeld
- Edited by: Herbert Taschner
- Music by: Karl Bette
- Production company: Kronen-Film
- Distributed by: DEFIR
- Release date: 6 April 1955
- Running time: 90 minutes
- Country: West Germany
- Language: German

The Blacksmith of St. Bartholomae (German: Der Schmied von St. Bartholomä) is a 1955 West German drama film directed by Max Michel and starring Viktor Staal, Marianne Koch and Annie Rosar. It was shot on location at Berchtesgaden in Bavaria and in a makeshift studio nearby. The film's sets were designed by the art director Curt Stallmach. It was part of the postwar boom in heimatfilm that peaked around this year.

== Synopsis ==
After nine years in a Soviet Prisoner of War camp, a former blacksmith returns to his home village in the Alps but has been left emotionally scarred and bitter from his experiences and struggles to settle back in.

== Cast ==
- Viktor Staal as Thomas
- Marianne Koch as Marianne
- Heinz Engelmann as Martin
- Annie Rosar as Andrea
- Rolf von Nauckhoff as Pater Bernhard
- Sepp Rist as Gend.-Inspektor
- Gustl Gstettenbaur as Max
- Peter Czejke as Walter
- Til Kiwe as Ruppert
- Heinz Schimmelpfennig as Landstreicher
- Franz Loskarn as Gend.-Komissar

== Bibliography ==
- Bock, Hans-Michael & Bergfelder, Tim. The Concise CineGraph. Encyclopedia of German Cinema. Berghahn Books, 2009.
- Moeller, Robert G. War Stories: The Search for a Usable Past in the Federal Republic of Germany. University of California Press, 2001.
