= The Village Under the Sky =

1953 film

- Inge Egger and Robert Freitag
- Directed by: Richard Häussler
- Written by: Gerhard Biller; Siegfried Breuer; Rolf Olsen (novel)
- Produced by: Helmut Beck
- Starring: Inge Egger; Robert Freitag; Renate Mannhardt
- Cinematography: Ernst W. Kalinke
- Edited by: Max Michel
- Music by: Bernhard Eichhorn
- Production company: Interlux-Film
- Distributed by: Union-Film
- Release date: 13 March 1953
- Running time: 97 minutes
- Country: West Germany
- Language: German

The Village Under the Sky (German: Das Dorf unterm Himmel) is a 1953 West German drama film directed by Richard Häussler and starring Inge Egger, Robert Freitag and Renate Mannhardt. It was made at the Bavaria Studios in Munich and on location at Ötztal in the Alps. The film's sets were designed by the art director Robert Herlth. It was based on the short story Der Januck by Rolf Olsen.

== Cast ==
- Inge Egger as Maria Firner
- Robert Freitag as Dr. Michael Ellert
- Renate Mannhardt as Anja, Dorfwirtin
- Peter Mosbacher as Schmuggler Lois
- Hedwig Wangel as Luccia, Kräuterweib
- Heinrich Gretler as Pfarrer Randlmann
- Franz Muxeneder as Beppo, der Narr
- Gustl Gstettenbaur as Schmuggler Toni
- Sepp Rist as Vincenz, Dorfwirt
- Walter Ladengast as Schmuggler Kaspar
- Beppo Schwaiger

== Bibliography ==
- Bock, Hans-Michael & Bergfelder, Tim. The Concise CineGraph. Encyclopedia of German Cinema. Berghahn Books, 2009.
- Goble, Alan. The Complete Index to Literary Sources in Film. Walter de Gruyter, 1999.
