= Das Fräulein von Scuderi =

1955 film directed by Eugen York

- Directed by: Eugen York
- Written by: E. T. A. Hoffmann (novella Mademoiselle de Scuderi); Joachim Barckhausen
- Starring: Henny Porten
- Release date: 29 July 1955
- Running time: 99 minutes
- Country: East Germany
- Language: German

Das Fräulein von Scuderi is an East German crime film directed by Eugen York, and starring Henny Porten in the title role. It was released in 1955. The film is an adaptation of Mademoiselle de Scuderi, a 1819 novella by E.T.A. Hoffmann.

== Cast ==
- Henny Porten as Fräulein von Scuderi
- Willy A. Kleinau as Cardillac
- Anne Vernon as Madelon
- Roland Alexandre as Olivier Brusson
- Angelika Hauff as St Croix
- Richard Häussler as Miossens
- Mathieu Ahlersmeyer as Louis XIV
- Alexander Engel as La Regnie
- Hans-Peter Thielen as Degrais
- Johannes Arpe as Louvois
- Barbro Hiort af Ornäs as La Matiniere
- Pat Svenson as Hofdame
- Ruth Arnim as Hofdame
- Alf Östlund as Theaterdirektor
