= Walter Fredersdorf =

German film editor

- Born: 20 February 1896; Magdeburg, German Empire
- Died: 29 September 1965 (aged 69)
- Occupation: Editor
- Years active: 1936 – 1964 (film)

Walter Fredersdorf (20 February 1896 – 29 September 1965) was a German film editor. Fredersdorf worked as editor on more than forty films, and also as assistant director on another five.

== Selected filmography ==
- Black Roses (1935)
- Winter in the Woods (1936)
- A Wedding Dream (1936)
- Truxa (1937)
- The Divine Jetta (1937)
- Faded Melody (1938)
- Anna Favetti (1938)
- The Blue Fox (1938)
- The Governor (1939)
- A Woman Like You (1939)
- Who's Kissing Madeleine? (1939)
- Enemies (1940)
- Quax the Crash Pilot (1941)
- Ghost in the Castle (1947)
- Paths in Twilight (1948)
- Abundance of Life (1950)
- Furioso (1950)
- Eyes of Love (1951)
- Carnival in White (1952)
- The Chaplain of San Lorenzo (1953)
- Everything for Father (1953)
- Spring Song (1954)
- Island of the Dead (1955)

== Bibliography ==
- Giesen, Rolf. Nazi Propaganda Films: A History and Filmography. McFarland & Company, 2003.
