= The Wedding Hotel =

1944 film directed by Carl Boese

- Directed by: Carl Boese
- Written by: Gustav Kampendonk; Géza von Cziffra; Carl Boese
- Produced by: Erich Holder
- Starring: Karin Hardt; René Deltgen; Walter Janssen; Ernst Waldow
- Cinematography: Konstantin Irmen-Tschet
- Edited by: Willy Zeunert
- Music by: Willy Mattes
- Production company: UFA
- Distributed by: Deutsche Filmvertriebs
- Release date: 12 December 1944
- Running time: 84 minutes
- Country: Germany
- Language: German

The Wedding Hotel (German: Das Hochzeitshotel) is a 1944 German comedy film directed by Carl Boese and starring Karin Hardt, René Deltgen and Walter Janssen. Interirors were shot at the Babelsberg Studios in Potsdam with sets designed by the art director Herbert Frohberg. Due to Allied bombing raids on German cities like Berlin, much of the film was shot around Kitzbühel in Tyrol. It was one of a number of light-hearted German films made in the final year of the Third Reich.

== Synopsis ==
A group of artists and journalists enjoy a series of romantic entanglements in a country hotel. An author, Vera von Eichberg "of whom no photo exists," has mentioned the hotel in her work, boosting its notoriety. When another female guest arrives, everyone assumes she is the author, despite her repeated assertions to the contrary.

== Main cast ==
- Karin Hardt as Brigitte Elling, Verkäuferin
- René Deltgen as Viktor Hoffmann, Pressephotograph
- Walter Janssen as Burgmüller, Schriftsteller
- Ernst Waldow as Alexander, sein Sekretär
- Hermann Pfeiffer as Dr. Wolter, Burgmüllers Verleger
- Hans Hermann Schaufuß as Rupp, Chef eines Pressedienstes
- Georg Vogelsang as Nepomuk Balg, Amtsvorsteher
- Helmuth Helsig as Hacke, Kriminalkommissar
- Edwin Jürgensen as Berendt, Juwelier
- Roma Bahn as Frau Berendt
- Hans Fidesser as Geschäftsführer im "Seehotel"
- Ernst Sattler as Portier im "Seehotel"
- Franz Weber as Knauer, Herausgeber einer Provinzzeitung

== Bibliography ==
- Kreimeier, Klaus. The Ufa Story: A History of Germany's Greatest Film Company, 1918–1945. University of California Press, 1999.
