= Erich Claunigk =

German cinematographer

- Born: 1 January 1900; Berlin, Prussia, German Empire
- Died: 14 November 1976 (aged 76); Grünwald, Bavaria, West Germany
- Occupation: Cinematographer
- Years active: 1928–1964 (film)

Erich Claunigk (1900–1976) was a German cinematographer. He was active during the Nazi era and postwar years in West Germany and frequently worked on comedy films.

== Selected filmography ==
- Hilde and the Volkswagen (1936)
- Ball at the Metropol (1937)
- The Scoundrel (1939)
- Three Wonderful Days (1939)
- Anuschka (1942)
- Johann (1943)
- The Dark Day (1943)
- The Song of the Nightingale (1944)
- A Man Like Maximilian (1945)
- I'll Make You Happy (1949)
- The Secret of the Red Cat (1949)
- Good Fortune in Ohio (1950)
- The Disturbed Wedding Night (1950)
- Theodore the Goalkeeper (1950)
- My Friend the Thief (1951)
- The Secret of a Marriage (1951)
- Once on the Rhine (1952)
- Fanfare of Marriage (1953)
- The Bachelor Trap (1953)
- Salto Mortale (1953)
- Street Serenade (1953)
- Columbus Discovers Kraehwinkel (1954)
- The Double Husband (1955)
- Three Girls from the Rhine (1955)
- My Children and I (1955)
- Lemke's Widow (1957)
- Two Bavarians in the Harem (1957)
- Doctor Bertram (1957)
- The Crammer (1958)
- A Doctor of Conviction (1959)
- Hula-Hopp, Conny (1959)
- Roses for the Prosecutor (1959)
- Triplets on Board (1959)
- The Black Sheep (1960)
- The Juvenile Judge (1960)
- Conny and Peter Make Music (1960)
- He Can't Stop Doing It (1962)
- My Daughter and I (1963)
- A Mission for Mr. Dodd (1964)

== Bibliography ==
- Giesen, Rolf. Nazi Propaganda Films: A History and Filmography. McFarland, 2003.
- Nicolella, Henry. Frank Wisbar: The Director of Ferryman Maria, from Germany to America and Back. McFarland, 2018.
