= Spring Song (1954 film) =

1954 film

- Directed by: Hans Albin
- Written by: Peter Francke
- Starring: Anne-Marie Blanc; René Deltgen; Albert Lieven
- Cinematography: Erich Küchler; Ulrich Ritzer; Klaus von Rautenfeld
- Edited by: Walter Fredersdorf
- Music by: Lothar Brühne
- Production companies: Albin Film; Mander Film
- Distributed by: Deutsche London-Film
- Release date: 4 November 1954
- Running time: 95 minutes
- Countries: Italy; West Germany
- Language: German

Spring Song (German: Frühlingslied, Italian: Piccoli amici) is a 1954 German-Italian drama film directed by Hans Albin, and starring Anne-Marie Blanc, René Deltgen, and Albert Lieven.

The film's sets were designed by the art directors Ernst H. Albrecht and Paul Markwitz. It was partly shot on location in Switzerland.

== Cast ==
- Oliver Grimm as Wolfgang Fabricius
- Elsbeth Sigmund as Vreni / Heidi
- Martin Andreas as Jöggi
- Anne-Marie Blanc as Elisabeth Lauber
- René Deltgen as Eduard Fabricius
- Albert Lieven as Dr. Andermatt
- Heinrich Gretler as Uncle Abegg
- Leonard Steckel as Dr. Falconi
- Bobby Todd
- Renate Feuereisen as Rösli - Hausmädchen
- Erna Sellmer as Anna, Köchin
- Karl Supper as Dr. Rudd
- Anneliese Betschart as Bach-Bäuerin
- Anne-Marie Hanschke as Fräulein Reuter
- Willy Frey as Pfarrer
- Heinz-Leo Fischer
- Alfred Rasser
- Elisabeth Lauber

== Bibliography ==
- Bock, Hans-Michael & Bergfelder, Tim. The Concise CineGraph. Encyclopedia of German Cinema. Berghahn Books, 2009.
