= Sensation in Savoy =

1950 film

- Directed by: Eduard von Borsody
- Written by: Karl Georg Külb
- Produced by: Erwin Gitt; Willi Herrmann
- Starring: Sybille Schmitz; Paul Klinger; Karl Schönböck
- Cinematography: Walter Pindter
- Edited by: Lilian Seng
- Music by: Kurt Graunke
- Production companies: Allegro-Film; Bavaria Film
- Distributed by: Siegel-Monopolfilm
- Release date: 22 September 1950
- Running time: 80 minutes
- Country: West Germany
- Language: German

Sensation in Savoy (German: Sensation im Savoy) is a 1950 West German comedy crime film directed by Eduard von Borsody and starring Sybille Schmitz, Paul Klinger, and Karl Schönböck.

It was made by Bavaria Film at their Bavaria Studios in Munich. The film's sets were designed by the art director Ernst H. Albrecht.

== Cast ==
- Sybille Schmitz as Vera Gordon
- Paul Klinger as Andreas Behrend
- Karl Schönböck as René Rocan
- Harald Paulsen as Haberkorn
- Adolf Gondrell as Untersuchungsrichter
- Fritz Kampers as Polizist
- Beppo Brem as Gerichtsdiener
- Helmuth Rudolph as Kriminalrat
- Rudolf Schündler as Hotelportier
- Ulrich Beiger as Junger Inder
- Hans Weicker as Maharadscha
- Harald Mannl as Bradt
- Rose Rauch
- Fritz Bender
- Fritz Hube
- Karl Lieffen
- Axel Scholtz
- Sammy Drechsel
- Aldo Roverselli

== Bibliography ==
- O'Brien, Mary-Elizabeth (2006) [2004]. Nazi Cinema as Enchantment: The Politics of Entertainment in the Third Reich. Rochester, NY: Boydell & Brewer. ISBN 978-1-57113-334-2.
