= Your Heart Is My Homeland =

1953 film

- Directed by: Richard Häussler
- Written by: Irmgard Wurmbrand (novel); Thea von Harbou
- Starring: Inge Egger; Erwin Strahl; Viktor Staal
- Cinematography: Walter Tuch
- Edited by: Max Michel
- Music by: Anton Profes
- Production companies: Beta Film; Primus Film
- Distributed by: Kopp-Filmverleih
- Release date: 13 November 1953
- Running time: 81 minutes
- Countries: Austria; West Germany
- Language: German

Your Heart Is My Homeland (German: Dein Herz ist meine Heimat) is a 1953 Austrian-West German drama film directed by Richard Häussler and starring Inge Egger, Erwin Strahl and Viktor Staal. It is also known as Magdalena Percht after the lead character. It is part of the trend of post-war heimatfilm. It was shot at the Bavaria Studios in Munich and on location in Salzburg.

The script was written by Metropolis screenwriter Thea von Harbou. The project had originally been planned in 1947 to be directed by Eduard von Borsody as a comeback vehicle for the actor Attila Hörbiger.

== Cast ==
- Inge Egger as Magdalena Percht
- Erwin Strahl as Andreas Möbius
- Viktor Staal as Christian Möbius
- Elisabeth Markus as Magdalenas Mutter
- Heinrich Gretler as Bürgermeister Percht
- Albert Florath as Lehrer
- Walter Janssen as Pfarrer
- Bum Krüger as Wirt
- Melanie Horeschowsky as Frau Heftel
- Alfred Menhardt
- Eva Orler
- Anton Gaugl
- Gustav Waldau
- Kurt von Lessen

== Bibliography ==
- Fritsche, Maria. Homemade Men in Postwar Austrian Cinema: Nationhood, Genre and Masculinity. Berghahn Books, 2013.
- Von Dassanowsky, Robert. Austrian Cinema: A History. McFarland, 2005.
