= Ulrich Beiger =

German actor (1918–1996)

Ulrich Beiger (26 August 1918 – 18 September 1996) was a German actor.

== Selected filmography ==
- The Little Residence (1942) - Möller
- The Trip to Marrakesh (1949) - Mixer
- Sensation in Savoy (1950) - young Indian
- Scandal at the Embassy (1950)
- Heart's Desire (1951) - resident physician
- One Night's Intoxication (1951) - Dr. Felix Fichtner
- The Imaginary Invalid (1952) - Rolf
- The Forester's Daughter (1952) - Simmerl
- The White Horse Inn (1952) - Sigismund
- The Little Town Will Go to Sleep (1954)
- Clivia (1954)
- Portrait of an Unknown Woman (1954) - auctioneer
- The Confession of Ina Kahr (1954)
- Oasis (1955) - hairdresser
- Silence in the Forest (1955) - Diener Martin
- The Major and the Bulls (1955) - CIC-Lieutenant Houseman
- Manöverball (1956) - Adjutant
- El Hakim (1957) - Prince Ali Hussni
- Eva küßt nur Direktoren (1958) - Mario Marinadi
- Der lachende Vagabund (1958)
- The Shepherd from Trutzberg (1959) - Heini von Seeburg
- Besuch aus heiterem Himmel (1959) - Dr. Friedhelm von Säuerlich, domain administrator
- Der Frosch mit der Maske (1959) - Everett
- The Crimson Circle (1960) - Osborne
- Oh! This Bavaria! (1960)
- The Terrible People (1960) - Mr. Henry
- The Forger of London (1961) - Inspector Rouper
- Im schwarzen Rößl (1961) - Sigismund
- Max the Pickpocket (1962) - entertainer
- Freddy and the Song of the South Pacific (1962)
- The Great Escape (1963) - Preissen
- Don't Tell Me Any Stories (1964) - patron in typing pool
- The Gentlemen (1965) - Grischa - episode 'Die Bauern'
- Melissa (1966, TV miniseries) - Duncan
- Onkel Filser – Allerneueste Lausbubengeschichten (1966) - chairman (uncredited)
- Bübchen (1968) - chief inspector
- Einer fehlt beim Kurkonzert (1968, TV film) - Dr. Eisenreich
- Klassenkeile (1969) - Prof. Hasemann
- Die Feuerzangenbowle (1970) - Member of the Round table
- Who Laughs Last, Laughs Best (1971) - Richard Mertens
- Mädchen beim Frauenarzt (1971) - Karin's Father
- Twenty Girls and the Teachers (1971)
- Aunt Trude from Buxtehude (1971) - bank manager
- Wir hau’n den Hauswirt in die Pfanne (1971) - Italian shepherd
- Jailbreak in Hamburg (1971) - Berndorf
- Die Klosterschülerinnen (1972) - Alwin Achsmann
- Crazy – Completely Mad (1973) - doctor
- Geh, zieh dein Dirndl aus (1973) - Conte Traverso
- Hau drauf, Kleiner (1974) - Morelli
- Three Men in the Snow (1974) - prosecutor
- Es knallt – und die Engel singen (1974) - Don Rosario, the Godfather
- Charley's Nieces (1974) - Dr. Stingl
- Oktoberfest! Da kann man fest... (1974) - Kovac
- No Sin on the Alpine Pastures (1974) - doctor
- The Maddest Car in the World (1975) - Marchese de la Pozzi
- Schulmädchen-Report 9: Reifeprüfung vor dem Abitur (1975) - Hubert, Lilo's father (uncredited)
- Ich denk’ mich tritt ein Pferd (1975)
- Lady Dracula (1977)
- Schulmädchen-Report 11. Teil - Probieren geht über Studieren (1977) - Prosecutor Jenkel (uncredited)
- Das Gesetz des Clans (1977) - Commissar Ramirez
- Natascha – Todesgrüße aus Moskau (1977)
- Schulmädchen-Report 12. Teil - Wenn das die Mammi wüßte (1978) - Ottokar Kuppler (uncredited)
- Zwei tolle Käfer räumen auf (1979)
- Laß laufen, Kumpel (1981)
- The Confessions of Felix Krull (1982, TV miniseries)
- Three Crazy Jerks (1987)
- Driving Me Crazy (1991) - Klein
