= The Queen of the Landstrasse =

1948 film

- Directed by: Géza von Cziffra
- Written by: Géza von Cziffra
- Starring: Angelika Hauff; Rudolf Prack; Hermann Erhardt
- Cinematography: Hans Schneeberger
- Music by: Hanns Elin; Anton Profes
- Production company: Löwen-Filmproduktion
- Distributed by: Prisma
- Release date: 8 October 1948
- Running time: 88 minutes
- Country: Austria
- Language: German

The Queen of the Landstrasse (German: Königin der Landstrasse) is a 1948 Austrian romance film directed by Géza von Cziffra and starring Angelika Hauff, Rudolf Prack and Hermann Erhardt. The film's sets were designed by art director Fritz Jüptner-Jonstorff.

== Cast ==
- Angelika Hauff as Flora Giebel genannt "Lulu"
- Rudolf Prack as Michael von Dornberg
- Hermann Erhardt as Johannes Giebel
- Ditta Donnah as Nellie Giebel
- Albin Skoda as Alfredo
- Karl Skraup as Niko
- Dagny Servaes as Regina von Dornberg, Michaels Tante
- Karl Günther
- Petra Trautmann as Gaby

== Bibliography ==
- Robert Dassanowsky. Austrian Cinema: A History. McFarland, 2005.
