= In Hamburg When the Nights Are Long =

- Directed by: Max Michel
- Written by: Peter Francke
- Produced by: Ernst Steinlechner
- Starring: Barbara Rütting; Erwin Strahl; Dorit Kreysler
- Cinematography: Karl Schröder
- Edited by: Lieselotte Prattes
- Music by: Karl Bette
- Production company: Kronen-Film
- Distributed by: J. Arthur Rank Film
- Release date: 24 February 1956
- Running time: 100 minutes
- Country: West Germany
- Language: German

In Hamburg When the Nights Are Long (German: In Hamburg sind die Nächte lang) is a 1956 West German crime film directed by Max Michel and starring Barbara Rütting, Erwin Strahl and Dorit Kreysler. It was shot at the Göttingen Studios. The film's sets were designed by the art director Curt Stallmach.

== Cast ==
- Barbara Rütting as Karin Thorwaldt
- Erwin Strahl as Hans Karst
- Dorit Kreysler as Lili Radona
- Werner Fuetterer as Andersson
- Alexander Golling as Alexander Borgess
- Ernst von Klipstein as Kapitän Reinhardt
- John Van Dreelen as Peter Drante
- Gustl Gstettenbaur Conny
- Christiane Maybach as Helen Dayton
- Joseph Offenbach as Klitzchen
- Peter Bermbach as Dr. Calton
- Willy Rösner as Vater Grigori
- Waldemar Adelberger as Kriminalrat Lieberenz
- Robert Meyn as Konsul Thorwaldt

== Bibliography ==
- Gustav Meier. Filmstadt Göttingen: Bilder für eine neue Welt? : zur Geschichte der Göttinger Spielfilmproduktion 1945 bis 1961. Reichold, 1996.
