= Gertrud Hinz =

German film editor

- Born: 8 July 1912; Berlin, German Empire
- Died: 1 September 1996 (aged 84); Pullach im Isartal, Germany
- Other name: Gertrud Hinz-Nischwitz
- Occupation: Editor
- Years active: 1937–1971

Gertrud Hinz (8 July 1912 – 1 September 1996) was a German film editor. She was married to the cinematographer Theo Nischwitz and was sometimes credited as Gertrud Hinz-Nischwitz. She edited more than sixty films and television series during her career. In the Nazi era she edited the anti-British adventure film Uproar in Damascus (1939) and the war film Bloodbrotherhood (1941).

== Selected filmography ==
- Ride to Freedom (1937)
- The Man Who Was Sherlock Holmes (1937)
- An Enemy of the People (1937)
- Tango Notturno (1937)
- Secret Code LB 17 (1938)
- The Secret Lie (1938)
- Uproar in Damascus (1939)
- The Desert Song (1939)
- Bloodbrotherhood (1941)
- Mask in Blue (1943)
- Circus Renz (1943)
- Beloved Darling (1943)
- Carnival of Love (1943)
- Music in Salzburg (1944)
- Life Calls (1944)
- I'll Make You Happy (1949)
- The Murder Trial of Doctor Jordan (1949)
- The Secret of the Red Cat (1949)
- Regimental Music (1950)
- Desire (1951)
- The Last Shot (1951)
- Heart's Desire (1951)
- Turtledove General Delivery (1952)
- House of Life (1952)
- Towers of Silence (1952)
- Marriage for One Night (1953)
- A Parisian in Rome (1954)
- The Fisherman from Heiligensee (1955)
- The Golden Bridge (1956)
- My Husband's Getting Married Today (1956)
- The Ideal Woman (1959)
- I Learned That in Paris (1960)
- Life Begins at Eight (1962)

== Bibliography ==
- Giesen, Rolf. Nazi propaganda films. McFarland & Co, 2003.
