= The Girl from the South Seas =

1950 film

- Directed by: Hans Müller
- Written by: Gustav Kampendonk
- Produced by: Fritz Kirchhoff
- Starring: Angelika Hauff; Madelon Truß; Hardy Krüger
- Cinematography: Fritz Arno Wagner
- Music by: Hans-Otto Borgmann
- Production company: Pontus Film
- Distributed by: National-Film
- Release date: 29 September 1950
- Running time: 85 minutes
- Country: West Germany
- Language: German

The Girl from the South Seas (German: Das Mädchen aus der Südsee) is a 1950 West German comedy film directed by Hans Müller and starring Angelika Hauff, Madelon Truß and Hardy Krüger.

The film's sets were designed by the art directors Ernst H. Albrecht and Theo Zwierski.

== Cast ==
- Angelika Hauff as Lale Pieper
- Madelon Truß as Jessie Altkamp
- Hardy Krüger as Richard Kirbach
- Peter Mosbacher as Ralph Wandrey
- Albert Florath as Arnold Pieper
- Erna Sellmer as Wilhelma
- Ah Yue Lou as Kurri
- Käthe Haack as Frau Wellenkamp
- Walter Giller as Lothar
- Hubert von Meyerinck
- Franz Schafheitlin
- Carl Voscherau
- Wolfgang Rotberg
- Karl-Heinz Peters
- Horst von Otto
- Kurt Meister
- Joseph Offenbach
- Herbert Wilk
- Arnim Dahl as Verkehrspolizist

== Bibliography ==
- Bock, Hans-Michael & Bergfelder, Tim. The Concise CineGraph. Encyclopedia of German Cinema. Berghahn Books, 2009.
