= Rolf von Nauckhoff =

Swedish actor

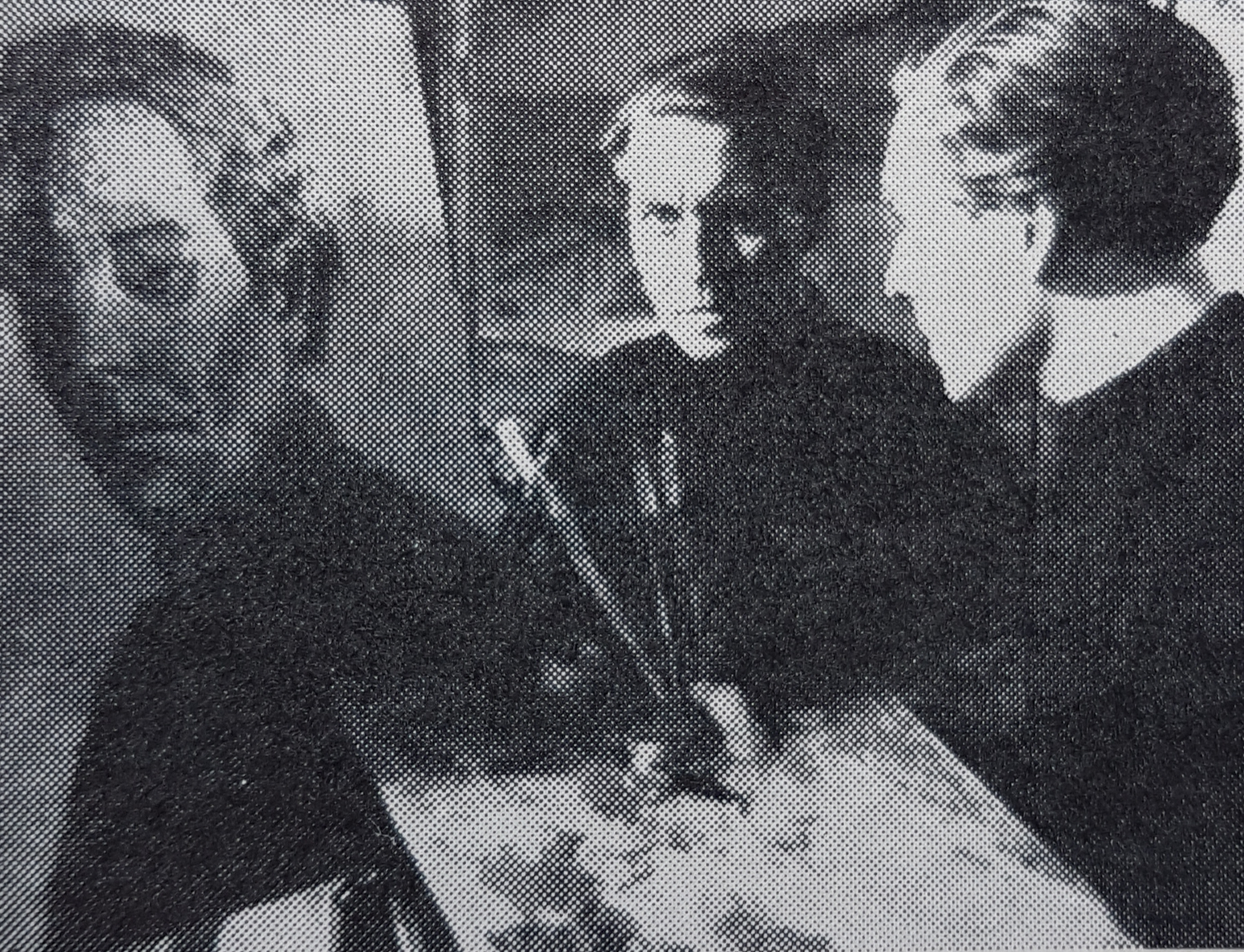
- Born: 15 May 1909; Stockholm, Sweden
- Died: 25 June 1968 (aged 59); Munich, Bavaria, West Germany
- Occupation: Actor
- Years active: 1936-1968 (film)

Rolf von Nauckhoff (1909–1968) was a Swedish film actor who worked mainly in Germany.

== Selected filmography ==
- Johan Ulfstjerna (1936) - Student reading a poem (uncredited)
- Shipwrecked Max (1936) - Waiter
- All Lies (1938) - Paul, Rechtsanwalt
- Hurrah! I'm a Father (1939) - Freund von Peter
- Duel with Death (1949) - Dr. Ernst Romberg
- White Gold (1949) - Ing. Hopkins
- The Orplid Mystery (1950) - Pastor Johannes Klappstein
- The Man Who Wanted to Live Twice (1950) - Dr. Ihlenfeld
- Crown Jewels (1950) - Minister
- Die Tat des Anderen (1951)
- Heart's Desire (1951) - Chefarzt Dr. Thomas
- Desire (1951) - Martin Reval
- The Lady in Black (1951) - Henry Richards
- The Clang of the Pick (1952) - Gert Willenhart
- Man on a Tightrope (1953) - Police Agent (uncredited)
- A Heart Plays False (1953) - Direktor Hersbach
- Red Roses, Red Lips, Red Wine (1953) - Kunsthändler Thormann
- Love's Awakening (1953) - Peter von Prahm, Reitlehrer
- Stars Over Colombo (1953) - Pahana
- The Prisoner of the Maharaja (1954) - Pahana
- Captain Wronski (1954) - SS-Unterführer
- Operation Edelweiss (1954) - Eike Rasmussen
- A Double Life (1954) - Professeur Werner
- The Blacksmith of St. Bartholomae (1955) - Pater Bernhard
- A Girl Without Boundaries (1955)
- Vor 100 Jahren fing es an (1956)
- Liane, Jungle Goddess (1956) - Prof. Danner
- Rübezahl (1957) - A Guest
- Nature Girl and the Slaver (1957) - Professor Danner
- Between Munich and St. Pauli (1957) - Polizeikommissar in Hamburg
- The Doctor of Stalingrad (1958) - Colonel Eklund, Swedish Red Cross
- Heiße Ware (1959) - Kriminalbeamter
- Crime After School (1959)
- A Doctor of Conviction (1959) - Kriminalinspektor Krüger
- The Cow and I (1959) - German Captain at the Bridge (uncredited)
- Oriental Nights (1960)
- Mistress of the World (1960) - Dalkin
- ...und keiner schämte sich (1960) - Dr. Berger
- Mal drunter - mal drüber (1960) - Fluglehrer
- Question 7 (1961) - Karl Marschall - Kirchenältester
- The Magic Fountain (1961) - Sir Phillip
- Two Bavarians in Bonn (1962) - Familienminister
- Encounter in Salzburg (1964) - Hiesemann
- No Survivors, Please (1964)
- Maneater of Hydra (1967) - James Robinson
- Das Rasthaus der grausamen Puppen (1967) - Jack Oland
- Schrei nach Lust (1968) - (final film role)

== Bibliography ==
- Peter Cowie & Derek Elley. World Filmography: 1967. Fairleigh Dickinson University Press, 1977.
