= Golden Goddess of Rio Beni =

1964 film

- Directed by: Franz Eichhorn; Eugenio Martín
- Written by: Gustav Kampendonk; Eugenio Martín; Gabriel Moreno Burgos
- Produced by: Alfons Carcasona; Franz Eichhorn; Luiz Severiano Ribeiro; Franz Thierry; Constantino Verleigh
- Starring: Pierre Brice; Gillian Hills; René Deltgen
- Cinematography: Edgar Eichhorn; Manuel Hernández Sanjuán; Paul Soulignac
- Edited by: Heidi Genée; Waldemar Noya
- Music by: Georges Garvarentz
- Production companies: Atlântida Cinematográfica; Comptoir Français du Film Production; Constantin Film; International Germania Film; Procusa
- Distributed by: Constantin Film (West Germany)
- Release date: 4 September 1964
- Running time: 91 minutes
- Countries: Brazil; France; Spain; West Germany
- Language: German

Golden Goddess of Rio Beni (German: Die goldene Göttin vom Rio Beni) is a 1964 adventure film directed by Franz Eichhorn and Eugenio Martín and starring Pierre Brice, Gillian Hills and René Deltgen. It was made as a co-production between Brazil, France, Spain and West Germany.

It is a remake of a 1950 film.

== Cast ==
- Pierre Brice as Jim
- Gillian Hills as Aloa
- René Deltgen as Bernard
- Harald Juhnke as Tom
- Emma Penella as Dinah
- Hans von Borsody as Jeff
- Gil Delamare

== Bibliography ==
- Bock, Hans-Michael & Bergfelder, Tim. The Concise CineGraph. Encyclopedia of German Cinema. Berghahn Books, 2009.
