= Thea Weis =

Austrian actress

- Born: 17 September 1924; Vienna, Austria
- Died: 16 March 1999 (aged 74)
- Occupation: Actress
- Years active: 1941-1952 (film)

Thea Weis (17 September 1924 – 16 March 1999) was an Austrian stage and film actress.

== Selected filmography ==
- Invitation to the Dance (1941)
- Whom the Gods Love (1942)
- Music in Salzburg (1944)
- That Was My Life (1944)
- Professor Nachtfalter (1951)

== Bibliography ==
- Robert Dassanowsky. Austrian Cinema: A History. McFarland, 2005.
