= How Do We Tell Our Children? =

1944 film

- Directed by: Hans Deppe
- Written by: Wilhelm Ehlers; Luiselotte Enderle; Toni Huppertz; Heinz Riedel; Volker von Collande
- Produced by: Erich Holder
- Starring: Leny Marenbach; Mathias Wieman; Hilde Körber
- Cinematography: Robert Baberske
- Music by: Hans-Otto Borgmann
- Production company: UFA
- Distributed by: Stern-Film Verleih
- Release date: 21 December 1949
- Running time: 89 minutes
- Country: Germany
- Language: German

How Do We Tell Our Children? (German: Wie sagen wir es unseren Kindern?) is a 1944 German comedy film directed by Hans Deppe and starring Leny Marenbach, Mathias Wieman and Hilde Körber. Made by the major German studio UFA, the film was not released until 21 December 1949 in Berlin and 13 March 1951 in Austria.

The film's sets were designed by the art director Wilhelm Vorwerg. Shooting took place in the Babelsberg Studios and on location in Dresden and Switzerland.

== Synopsis ==
In a suburb of Dresden, a widowed doctor with four children lives opposite a divorcee with three children. Gradually they fall in love despite the constant feuding between their children.

== Cast ==
- Leny Marenbach as Käthe Westhoff
- Mathias Wieman as Dr. Thomas Hofer
- Hilde Körber as Adele
- Ernst Waldow as Diesing
- Babsi Schultz-Reckewell as Sigrid
- Edmund van Kann as Klaus
- Jürgen Tusch as Wölfchen
- Hans-Dieter Gotzmann as Erich
- Herbert Stetza as Theo
- Hans Neie as Kurt
- Jürgen Peter Jacoby as Pepi
- Franz Schafheitlin
- Alexa von Porembsky

== See also ==
- Überläufer

== Bibliography ==
- Holmstrom, John. The Moving Picture Boy: An International Encyclopaedia from 1895 to 1995, Norwich, Michael Russell, 1996.
- Rentschler, Eric. The Ministry of Illusion: Nazi Cinema and Its Afterlife. Harvard University Press, 1996.
