= Ernst H. Albrecht =

German art director (1906–1982)

- Born: 9 September 1906; Leipzig, German Empire
- Died: 25 October 1982 (aged 76); Seeheim-Jugenheim, West Germany
- Occupation: Art Director
- Years active: 1938-1971 (film)

Ernst H. Albrecht (1906–1982) was a German art director. He worked on the sets of over eighty films during his career. He was employed mainly in Germany, but also worked on the Austrian film The Blue Star of the South in 1951.

== Selected filmography ==
- Adrienne Lecouvreur (1938)
- My Aunt, Your Aunt (1939)
- Alarm at Station III (1939)
- Between Hamburg and Haiti (1940)
- Love Me (1942)
- Life Calls (1944)
- Tell the Truth (1946)
- King of Hearts (1947)
- Everything Will Be Better in the Morning (1948)
- I'll Make You Happy (1949)
- Sensation in Savoy (1950)
- The Girl from the South Seas (1950)
- Only One Night (1950)
- The Blue Star of the South (1951)
- Desire (1951)
- The Last Shot (1951)
- One Night's Intoxication (1951)
- Carnival in White (1952)
- Scandal at the Girls' School (1953)
- Three from Variety (1954)
- Confession Under Four Eyes (1954)
- Spring Song (1954)
- The Inn on the Lahn (1955)
- I Know What I'm Living For (1955)
- I'll Carry You in My Arms (1958)
- Court Martial (1959)
- Mandolins and Moonlight (1959)
- Bombs on Monte Carlo (1960)
- My Husband, the Economic Miracle (1961)
- A Holiday Like Never Before (1963)
- Jack and Jenny (1963)
- The White Spider (1963)
- The Inn on Dartmoor (1964)
- The Secret of Dr. Mabuse (1964)
- Death in the Red Jaguar (1968)
- Death and Diamonds (1968)
- Hotel by the Hour (1970)
- That Can't Shake Our Willi! (1970)

== Bibliography ==
- Fritsche, Maria. Homemade Men in Postwar Austrian Cinema: Nationhood, Genre and Masculinity. Berghahn Books, 2013.
