= The Lady in Black (1951 film) =

1951 film

- Directed by: Erich Engels
- Written by: Erich Engels; Wolf Neumeister
- Produced by: Hans Tost
- Starring: Paul Hartmann; Mady Rahl; Rudolf Prack
- Cinematography: Ernst W. Kalinke
- Music by: Adolf Steimel
- Production company: Dornas-Film
- Distributed by: Union-Film
- Release date: 23 November 1951
- Running time: 93 minutes
- Country: West Germany
- Language: German

The Lady in Black (German: Die Dame in Schwarz) is a 1951 West German crime film directed by Erich Engels and starring Paul Hartmann, Mady Rahl and Rudolf Prack. It was shot at the Bavaria Studios in Munich. The film's sets were designed by the art director Max Mellin.

== Cast ==
- Paul Hartmann as Frederik Royce
- Mady Rahl as Bianca Monnier
- Rudolf Prack as Nils Corbett
- Harald Paulsen as 'Fürst' Balbanoff
- Inge Egger as Ann
- Franz Schafheitlin as Chefinspektor Marshall
- Ernst Fritz Fürbringer as Bankier Petterson
- Josefin Kipper as Carla Royce
- Rolf von Nauckhoff as Henry Richards
- Gertrud Wolle as Frau Dalström
- Toni Treutler as Frau Milovic
- Liesl Karlstadt as Frau Bogota
- Rudolf Schündler as Polizeiinspektor Polter
- Ludwig Schmidseder as Herr Bogota
- Ulrich Folkmar as Polizeiinspektor Bonden
- Petra Unkel

== Bibliography ==
- Hans-Michael Bock and Tim Bergfelder. The Concise Cinegraph: An Encyclopedia of German Cinema. Berghahn Books.
