= The Lost Face =

1948 film

- German: Das verlorene Gesicht
- Directed by: Kurt Hoffmann
- Written by: Harald Braun; Rolf Reissmann
- Produced by: Walter Bolz; Harald Braun
- Starring: Marianne Hoppe; Gustav Fröhlich; Richard Häussler
- Cinematography: Franz Koch
- Edited by: Adolf Schlyssleder
- Music by: Lothar Brühne
- Production company: Neue Deutsche Filmgesellschaft
- Distributed by: Schorcht Filmverleih
- Release date: 19 November 1948
- Running time: 98 minutes
- Country: Germany
- Language: German

The Lost Face (German: Das verlorene Gesicht) is a 1948 German drama film directed by Kurt Hoffmann and starring Marianne Hoppe, Gustav Fröhlich and Richard Häussler. The plot of a woman with two divided personalities caused by a recent trauma drew inspiration from the Gainsborough Melodrama Madonna of the Seven Moons which had been extremely popular on its release in Germany.

It was made at the Bavaria Studios in Munich with location shooting taking place in Heidelberg. The film's sets were designed by the art director Hans Kuhnert.

== Synopsis ==
In Stuttgart a lost and disorientated young woman is found. It is assumed she is from Tibet. She receives care from a doctor and falls in love with a lawyer. Yet suddenly her face and voice change and she emerges as a completely different woman.

== Cast ==
- Marianne Hoppe as Johanna Stegen
- Gustav Fröhlich as Dr. Thomas Martin
- Richard Häussler as Robert Lorm
- Paul Dahlke as Axel Witt
- Hermine Körner as Frau von Aldenhoff
- Harald Mannl as Leo L'Arronge
- Rudolf Vogel as Professor Kersten
- Walter Kiaulehn as Anstaltsarzt
- Erich Ponto as Wissenschaftler
- Bruno Hübner as Bildhauer
- Herbert Weicker as Dr. Rasan
- Ruth Killer as Sonja
- Eva Vaitl as Dame
- Helmuth Renar as Geheimrat Winter

== Bibliography ==
- Bergfelder, Tim. International Adventures: German Popular Cinema and European Co-Productions in the 1960s. Berghahn Books, 2005.
