= Friday the Thirteenth (1949 film) =

1949 film

- Fita Benkhoff and Rudolf Fernau
- Directed by: Erich Engels
- Written by: Erich Engels (play); Ernst Nebhut; Just Scheu
- Produced by: Eduard Kubat
- Starring: Fritz Kampers; Angelika Hauff; Fita Benkhoff
- Cinematography: E. W. Fiedler
- Edited by: Charlotte Steidinger
- Music by: Ludwig Schmidseder
- Production company: Terra Film
- Distributed by: Prisma Film (West Germany); Sovexport Film (East Germany)
- Release date: 9 November 1949
- Running time: 85 minutes
- Country: West Germany
- Language: German

Friday the Thirteenth (German: Freitag, der 13.) is a 1949 West German comedy crime film directed by Erich Engels and starring Fritz Kampers, Angelika Hauff, and Fita Benkhoff.

It was made by Terra Film in 1944, but was not released before the end of the Second World War. It received its much delayed premiere in 1949. It was one of several Nazi-era productions that were given releases in the years after the end of the war.

The film's sets were designed by the art director Artur Günther.

== Cast ==
- Fritz Kampers as Rapp, der Schloßherr
- Angelika Hauff as Irene, seine Stieftochter
- Fita Benkhoff as Vilma Reckennagel, die Hausdame
- Rudolf Fernau as Robert, der Diener
- Willi Rose as Oskar, der Chauffeur
- Carsta Löck as Ottilie, die Köchin
- Albert Hehn as Axel Westhaus
- Rolf Weih as Frank Fux
- Heinz Schorlemmer as Thomas Färber
- Ingrid Lutz as Betty, die Zofe
- Heinz Salfner as Haldenwang
- Bruno Hübner as Inspektor Derschugg
- Oskar Höcker as Paul, der Gärtner

== See also ==
- Überläufer

== Bibliography ==
- Rentschler, Eric (1996). The Ministry of Illusion: Nazi Cinema and Its Afterlife. Cambridge, MA: Harvard University Press. ISBN 978-0-674-57640-7.
