= Border Post 58 =

1951 West German film

- Directed by: Harry Hasso
- Written by: Harry Grimm; Wolf Neumeister; Hans Prechtl
- Produced by: Adolf Elling
- Starring: Hansi Knoteck; Mady Rahl; Elise Aulinger
- Cinematography: Sepp Allgeier
- Edited by: Norbert J. Pleyer
- Music by: Fritz Wenneis
- Production company: Astra Filmkunst
- Distributed by: Siegel Monopolfilm
- Release date: 16 March 1951
- Running time: 92 minutes
- Country: West Germany
- Language: German

Border Post 58 (German: Grenzstation 58) is a 1951 West German crime film directed by Harry Hasso and starring Hansi Knoteck, Mady Rahl and Elise Aulinger.

== Cast ==
- Hansi Knoteck as Anna Leitner
- Mady Rahl as Retta Schwaiger
- Elise Aulinger as Rosl
- Elisabeth Biebl as Maria Brandl
- Heinz Engelmann as Grenzoberjäger Reitlechner
- Sepp Rist as Sepp
- Ernst Fritz Fürbringer as Grenzpolizeiinspektor Hirzinger
- Hannes Keppler as Grenzoberjäger Mayer
- Willy Rösner as Leitnerbauer
- Ernst Stahl-Nachbaur as Kriminalkommissar Bernrieder
- Gustl Gstettenbaur as Grenzjäger Mitterer
- Heinz Ohlsen as Grenzjäger Schulze
- José Held as Grenzjäger Gschwendtner
- Viktor Afritsch as Kaufmann Springer
- Jochen Hauer as Dorfmüller Hauser
- Georg Vogelsang as Förster Guggemoos
- Hans Erich Pflegeras Gendermariewachtmeister Brandl
- Jutta Demeter as Teresa Pacosta
- Jeanette Heim as Sennerin
- Maria Freiberger as Lene Reitlechner
- Hans Bergmann as Kriminalassistent Prager
- Rudi Knabl as Grenzjäger Msisel
- Hermann Kowan as Untersuchungsrichter
- Emil Markgraber as Standesbeamter
- Emil Matousek
- Peter Sigmund as Grenzjäger Fiedler
- Richard Wagner as Loidl

== Bibliography ==
- Willi Höfig. Der deutsche Heimatfilm 1947–1960. F. Enke, 1973.
