= My Friend the Thief =

1951 film

- Directed by: Helmut Weiss
- Written by: Helmut Weiss
- Produced by: Helmut Weiss
- Starring: Hans Söhnker; Vera Molnar; Hardy Krüger
- Cinematography: Erich Claunigk
- Edited by: Anneliese Schönnenbeck
- Music by: Werner Bochmann
- Production company: Orlando-Film
- Distributed by: Constantin Film
- Release date: 8 November 1951
- Running time: 89 minutes
- Country: West Germany
- Language: German

My Friend the Thief (German: Mein Freund, der Dieb) is a 1951 West German comedy film directed by Helmut Weiss and starring Hans Söhnker, Vera Molnar and Hardy Krüger. It was shot at the Göttingen Studios and on location around Hanover. The film's sets were designed by the art director Walter Haag.

== Synopsis ==
Young thief Bimbo is part of the "lost generation" growing up in the shadow of the Second World War. However, when he steals the wallet of well-known writer Percy, the author decides to try and reform the young man with the assistance of his dancer girlfriend Nina. After some ups and downs, the gift of a camera convinces him he wants to work as a reporter.

== Cast ==
- Hans Söhnker as Percy
- Vera Molnar as Nina
- Hardy Krüger as Bimbo
- Olga Chekhova as Percy's Sister
- Theodor Danegger as Franz
- Käthe Haack as Angela
- Marianne Koch as Resl
- Edgar Ludovici
- Friedel Mumme
- Heini Müller
- Waus
- Benno Sterzenbach
- Charles Wirts

== Bibliography ==
- Bock, Hans-Michael & Bergfelder, Tim. The Concise Cinegraph: Encyclopaedia of German Cinema. Berghahn Books, 2009.
