= The Last Shot (1951 film) =

1951 film directed by Franz Seitz

- Directed by: Franz Seitz
- Written by: Franz Seitz
- Produced by: Franz Seitz Jr.
- Starring: Angelika Hauff; Viktor Staal; Heinrich Gretler
- Cinematography: Ernst W. Kalinke
- Edited by: Gertrud Hinz-Nischwitz
- Music by: Johannes Weissenbach
- Production company: Thalia-Film
- Distributed by: Continental Filmverleih
- Release date: 12 November 1951
- Running time: 72 minutes
- Country: West Germany
- Language: German

The Last Shot (German: Der letzte Schuß) is a 1951 West German historical drama film directed by Franz Seitz and starring Angelika Hauff, Viktor Staal and Heinrich Gretler. Set in rural Southern Germany, it is part of the post-war genre of heimatfilm. It was made by a Munich-based independent company at the Bavaria Studios. It was produced by the director's son, Franz Seitz Jr. Location shooting took place around the Schliersee in Bavaria. The film's sets were designed by Ernst H. Albrecht and Arne Flekstad.

== Cast ==
- Angelika Hauff as Hanni Manhard
- Viktor Staal as Thomas Scharrer
- Heinrich Gretler as Scharrer, Neuwirt
- Adolf Gondrell as Forstmeister Manhard
- Gustl Gstettenbaur as Jäger Martin
- Hans Terofal as Quirin, Knecht beim Neuwirt
- Georg Vogelsang as Gröberbauer
- Georg Bauer as Jäger Bartl
- Elise Aulinger as Gröberbäuerin
- Ilse Fitz as Loni, Tochter vom Gröberhof
- Paula Braend as Frau Manhard
- Theodolinde Müller as Afra, Sennerin

== Bibliography ==
- James Robert Parish. Film Actors Guide. Scarecrow Press, 1977.
