= The Secret of the Red Cat (1949 film) =

1949 film

- Directed by: Helmut Weiss
- Written by: Erich Engels; Helmut Weiss
- Produced by: Heinz Rühmann; Alf Teichs
- Starring: Heinz Rühmann; Gustav Knuth; Angelika Hauff
- Cinematography: Erich Claunigk
- Edited by: Gertrud Hinz-Nischwitz
- Music by: Werner Bochmann
- Production company: Comedia-Film
- Distributed by: Schorcht Filmverleih
- Release date: 14 April 1949
- Running time: 98 minutes
- Country: West Germany
- Language: German

The Secret of the Red Cat (German: Das Geheimnis der roten Katze) is a 1949 West German comedy crime film directed by Helmut Weiss and starring Heinz Rühmann, Gustav Knuth and Angelika Hauff. It was a remake of the 1931 film of the same title directed by Erich Schönfelder. It was shot at the Bavaria Studios in Munich and on location around the city. The film's sets were designed by the art director Max Mellin.

== Synopsis ==
André is a struggling actor working at the Red Cat nightclub in Paris where he provides atmosphere by playing a gang leader. He encounters Gloria, the daughter of an American millionaire. When her father's famous "Halifax Diamond is stolen, André is suspected of being the guilty party. In fact the crime was committed by professional thief Pitou. André adopts various disguises in order to expose Pitou's guilt.

== Cast ==
- Heinz Rühmann as André
- Gustav Knuth as Pitou
- Angelika Hauff as Gloria
- Trude Hesterberg as Laura
- Jakob Tiedtke as Tobias
- Otto Matthies as Moustache
- Erwin Eckersberg as Ponpon
- Alwin Lippisch as Catelain
- Erhard Siedel as Präfekt
- Hans Cossy as Sergeant
- Willy Friedrichs as Polizist
- Klaus W. Krause as Polizist
- Paul Schwed Paul as Ober
- Georg Vogelsang as Polizist

== Bibliography ==
- Bock, Hans-Michael & Bergfelder, Tim. The Concise Cinegraph: Encyclopaedia of German Cinema. Berghahn Books, 2009.
- Körner, Torsten. Der kleine Mann als Star: Heinz Rühmann und seine Filme der 50er Jahre. Campus Verlag, 2001.
- Limbacher, James L. Haven't I seen you somewhere before?: Remakes, sequels, and series in motion pictures and television, 1896-1978. Pierian Press, 1979.
