= Peter Mosbacher =

German actor

- Born: 17 February 1912; Mannheim, German Empire
- Died: 9 October 1977 (aged 65); Kempfenhausen, Bavaria, West Germany
- Occupation: Actor
- Years active: 1943-1975 (film & TV)

Peter Mosbacher (1912–1977) was a German stage, film and television actor.

== Filmography ==
Year	Title	Role	Notes
1943	Melody of a Great City	Kajetan Orff	
1948	Finale	Osthus, Regierungsrat	
1949	The Last Night	Major Brink, I.A.	
1949	Die Andere	Hippoliti Ezzcurra	
1949	The Prisoner	Lapin	
1949	Harbour Melody	Jan	
1950	Das Geheimnis des Hohen Falken	Gerkau - Pressephotograph	
1950	Blondes for Export	Alvaro	
1950	The Girl from the South Seas	Ralph Wandrey	
1950	Two Times Lotte	Ludwig Palfy - Opernkapellmeister	
1951	Not Without Gisela	Robert Halm	
1951	The Sinful Border	Zollkommissar Dietrich	
1951	Dark Eyes	Samboni	
1952	Pension Schöller	Eugen Rümpel	
1952	Homesick for You	Walter Schumann	
1953	We'll Talk About Love Later	Will Brodersen	
1953	The Village Under the Sky	Schmuggler Lois	
1953	Josef the Chaste	Georg Schilling	
1953	Red Roses, Red Lips, Red Wine	Pole	
1954	A Life for Do	Kapellmeister	
1954	The Perfect Couple	Alfred Tausendfreund, Finanzier	
1954	Canaris	Fernandez	
1955	The Plot to Assassinate Hitler	Major Otto Ernst Remer	
1955	Hotel Adlon	Boris Andrewski	
1955	Roman einer Siebzehnjährigen	Gerard	
1956	Die ganze Welt singt nur Amore	Peter, Olafs Freund	
1956	Liane, Jungle Goddess	Tibor Teleky	
1957	Salzburg Stories	Karl	
1957	The Last Ones Shall Be First	Zuhälter	
1957	Es wird alles wieder gut	Karl Egger, Ansager	
1957	The Fox of Paris	Maj. Wedekind	
1958	Hoppla, jetzt kommt Eddie	Manuel Fanton	
1958	Peter Voss, Thief of Millions	The Baron	
1958	Romarei, das Mädchen mit den grünen Augen	Kees Falkenried	
1959	Lockvogel der Nacht	Klaus Petzold	
1959	Peter Voss, Hero of the Day	Baron de Clock	
1963	Homesick for St. Pauli		Uncredited
1964	Freddy, Tiere, Sensationen	Raoul	
1965	The Face of Fu Manchu	Hanumon	
1967	Diabolically Yours	Kim	
1968	Im Banne des Unheimlichen	Ramiro	
1971	Das Messer	Dr. Richard Hall	TV Mini-Series, 3 episodes

== Bibliography ==
- Goble, Alan. The Complete Index to Literary Sources in Film. Walter de Gruyter, 1999.
