= Mady Rahl =

German actress

- Mady Rahl in the 1957 comedy, Ober zahlen
- Born: 3 January 1915; Neukölln, Berlin, Germany
- Died: 29 August 2009 (aged 94); Munich, Bavaria, Germany

Mady Rahl (3 January 1915 – 29 August 2009) was a German stage and film actress.

Born Edith Gertrud Meta Raschke in Neukölln (now part of Berlin), Rahl trained as an actress and dancer. In 1935, she made her stage debut in Leipzig under the direction of Douglas Sirk and started her film career in 1936 with the movie The Mysterious Mister X. With her role in the circus drama Truxa (1937), Rahl became known to a wider audience. After the war, she sang with her friend Elfreide Datzig for the USO. She ultimately appeared in approximately 90 movies, several of them for UFA. In later years, she appeared frequently on television, while also pursuing her career in the theatre. She was occasionally active in German dubbing, lending her voice to Lucille Ball, Ma Gorg on the puppet series Fraggle Rock, and others.

Rahl's first marriage was to financier Theodor Reimers, her second was to producer Wilhem Sperber, and her third was to architect Werner Bürkle. All three marriages ended in divorce, and she had no children. Late in life she painted in the Impressionist style.

In her last years, Rahl was almost blind and suffering from dementia. She lived in a retirement home in Munich, where her minder was Thomas Speyerer, and died of cancer in 2009.

Her grave is in the Nordfriedhof Cemetery in Munich (plot 178-U-66), where her sister Ellen had been buried in 1995.

== Selected filmography ==
- The Mysterious Mister X (1936)
- Truxa (1937)
- The Irresistible Man (1937)
- Zweimal zwei im Himmelbett (1937) (alongside Georg Alexander, Paul Henckels and Carola Höhn)
- To New Shores (1937) (Zarah Leander, Willy Birgel)
- Eine Nacht im Mai (1938) (Marika Rökk, Viktor Staal, Oskar Sima)
- Hello Janine! (1939) (Marika Rökk, Johannes Heesters)
- My Wife Theresa (1942) (Elfie Mayerhofer, Hans Söhnker)
- Beloved World (1942)
- Love Me (1942)
- Tonelli (1943)
- Sieben Briefe (1944) (O. W. Fischer)
- Somewhere in Berlin (1946)
- Tell the Truth (1946)
- Night of the Twelve (1949)
- The Blue Straw Hat (1949)
- Everything for the Company (1950)
- One Night's Intoxication (1951)
- Border Post 58 (1951)
- Scandal at the Embassy (1950)
- Eyes of Love (1951) (Käthe Gold, René Deltgen)
- The Lady in Black (1951) (Paul Hartmann, Rudolf Prack)
- The Blue and White Lion (1952)
- The Landlady of Maria Wörth (1952)
- Prisoners of Love (1954) (Curd Jürgens, Bernhard Wicki)
- Three from Variety (1954)
- The Tour Guide of Lisbon (1956)
- Imperial and Royal Field Marshal (1956)
- War of the Maidens (1957) (Gerlinde Locker, Oskar Sima, Kurt Heintel)
- The Heart of St. Pauli (1957) (Hans Albers, Gert Fröbe)
- Ober, zahlen! (1957) (Hans Moser, Paul Hörbiger)
- The Copper (1958)
- Sin Began with Eve (1958) (Willy Fritsch, Karin Dor)
- Stefanie (1958)
- The Girl with the Cat's Eyes (1958)
- Arena of Fear (1959)
- Darkness Fell on Gotenhafen (1960)
- The Forger of London (1961) (an Edgar Wallace movie)
- Hochzeit am Neusiedler See (1963) (Rolf Olsen, Gertraud Jesserer, Udo Jürgens, Rocco Granata)
- With Best Regards (1963)
- The White Spider (1963)
- Tim Frazer and the Mysterious Mister X (1964)
- The Inn on Dartmoor (1964)
- The Great Skate (1964)
- Holiday in St. Tropez (1964)
- The Hound of Blackwood Castle (1968)
- Karl May (1974) (biopic directed by Hans-Jürgen Syberberg)
- Das Gesetz des Clans (1977) (video title Ibiza - Der Tod kommt nur bei blauem Himmel)
- Der Sturz (1979) (based on a novel by Martin Walser)
- Die Wicherts von nebenan (TV series) (1986)
- Die glückliche Familie (TV series) (1987)
- The Aggression (1988)
- Polizeiruf 110 (TV series): episode "Vater unser" (2004)
