= Desire (1951 film) =

1951 film

- Directed by: Karl Georg Külb
- Written by: Karl Georg Külb
- Produced by: Walter Pindter
- Starring: Winnie Markus; Richard Häussler; Olga Tschechowa
- Narrated by: The Necklace by Guy de Maupassant
- Cinematography: Friedl Behn-Grund
- Edited by: Gertrud Hinz-Nischwitz
- Music by: Herbert Jarczyk
- Production companies: Allegro Film; Südwest Film
- Distributed by: Siegel-Monopolfilm
- Release date: 2 March 1951
- Running time: 105 minutes
- Country: West Germany
- Language: German

Desire (German: Begierde) is a 1951 West German historical drama film directed by Karl Georg Külb and starring Winnie Markus, Richard Häussler and Olga Tschechowa. It was shot at the Bavaria Studios in Munich. The film's sets were designed by the art director Ernst H. Albrecht. The plot is inspired by the 1884 short story The Necklace by Guy de Maupassant.

== Cast ==
- Winnie Markus as Susanne Reval
- Richard Häussler as Robert von Raviguy
- Rolf von Nauckhoff as Martin Reval
- Olga Tschechowa as Frau des Bankpräsidenten
- Gisela Fackeldey as Vera Veron, Opernsängerin
- Udo Loeptin as Baranowski - Veras Impressario
- Fritz Odemar as Der Bankpräsident
- Walter Janssen as Dr. Richards - ein Arzt
- Rolf Moebius as Paul - ein Maler

== Bibliography ==
- Beever. Antony. The Mystery of Olga Chekhova. Penguin, 2005.
- Bock, Hans-Michael & Bergfelder, Tim. The Concise CineGraph. Encyclopedia of German Cinema. Berghahn Books, 2009.
