= The Secret of a Marriage =

1951 film

- Directed by: Helmut Weiss
- Written by: Helmut Weiss
- Based on: Secret of a Marriage by Helmut Weiss
- Produced by: Martin Pichert
- Starring: Olga Chekhova; Curd Jürgens; Paul Klinger
- Cinematography: Erich Claunigk
- Edited by: Claus von Boro
- Music by: Alois Melichar
- Production company: Venus-Film
- Distributed by: Kopp-Filmverleih
- Release date: 7 September 1951
- Running time: 94 minutes
- Country: West Germany
- Language: German

The Secret of a Marriage (German: Geheimnis einer Ehe) is a 1951 West German comedy film directed by Helmut Weiss and starring Olga Chekhova, Curd Jürgens and Paul Klinger. It was adapted from Weiss' play of the same title. It was shot at the Bavaria Studios in Munich. The film's sets were designed by the art directors Fritz Lück and Hans Sohnle.

== Synopsis ==
A widow for fifteen years, Tina Camphausen has raised her three children by herself. Then her first lover, the conductor Felix Adrian, comes back into her life. Her growing affection for him offends her son Christian, who resents the newcomer moving into their house. Tina then has to break it to Christian that Felix is really his father.

== Cast ==
- Olga Chekhova as Tina Camphausen
- Curd Jürgens as Dirigent Felix Adrian
- Paul Klinger as Paul Brugger
- Harald Holberg as Christian Camphausen
- Ada Tschechowa as Schwänchen Camphausen
- Marianne Koch as Musi Camphausen
- Hedwig Wangel as Haushälterin
- Walter Janssen
- Fritz Odemar
- Alexander Ponto
- Peter Blank

== Bibliography ==
- Goble, Alan. The Complete Index to Literary Sources in Film. Walter de Gruyter, 1999.
- Schönfeld, Christiane. The History of German Literature on Film. Bloomsbury Publishing, 2023.
