= Dark Eyes (1951 film) =

1951 film directed by Géza von Bolváry

- Directed by: Géza von Bolváry
- Written by: Curth Flatow; Bobby E. Lüthge
- Produced by: Artur Brauner
- Starring: Cornell Borchers; Will Quadflieg; Angelika Hauff
- Cinematography: Herbert Körner
- Edited by: Johanna Meisel
- Music by: Frank Fox
- Production company: CCC Film
- Distributed by: Prisma Film
- Release date: 25 December 1951
- Running time: 88 minutes
- Country: West Germany
- Language: German

Dark Eyes (German: Schwarze Augen) is a 1951 German drama film directed by Géza von Bolváry and starring Cornell Borchers, Will Quadflieg, and Angelika Hauff. It was shot at the Spandau Studios in West Berlin. The film's sets were designed by the art directors Mathias Matthies and Ellen Schmidt.

== Synopsis ==
On the train from Nice to Vienna the violin virtuoso Fedor Varany meets Helene Samboni, the mistress of a wealthy businessman. He becomes fixated with her, begging her to leave both her lover and her estranged husband. She agrees to elope with him, but when her discarded lover is found dead, Varany becomes the prime suspect for his murder.

== Cast ==
- Cornell Borchers as Helene Samboni
- Will Quadflieg as Fedor Varany
- Angelika Hauff as Roszi
- Georg Thomalla as McKing, Impresario
- Peter Mosbacher as Samboni
- Martin Held as Alexander Grabner
- Hans Stiebner as Mitja
- Jan Hendriks as Laszlo
- Karl Meixner as von Pfandler
- Kurt Vespermann as Zeidler
- Rolf Weih as Schlafwagenschaffner
- Franz Arzdorf as Kriminalkommissar Neudeck
- Erwin Biegel
- Joe Furtner as Geschäftsführer des Tanzlokals
- Max Lammer as Nowak
- Michael von Newlinsky as Schlafwagenschaffner
- Rosita Serrano as La Cubanera
- Karl Hellmer as Kriminalrat Klausnitzer
- Georg Uka

== Bibliography ==
- Bock, Hans-Michael; Bergfelder, Tim, eds. (2009). The Concise Cinegraph: Encyclopaedia of German Cinema. New York: Berghahn Books. ISBN 978-1-57181-655-9.
