= Melusine (film) =

1944 film directed by Hans Steinhoff

- German film poster
- Directed by: Hans Steinhoff
- Written by: Richard Billinger (play); Werner Eplinius; Ernst Hasselbach; Hans Steinhoff
- Produced by: Hans Steinhoff
- Starring: Olga Chekhova; Siegfried Breuer; Angelika Hauff
- Cinematography: Richard Angst
- Edited by: Elisabeth Pewny
- Music by: Michael Jary
- Production company: Terra Film
- Distributed by: Deutsche Filmvertriebs
- Release date: 1944
- Running time: 92 minutes
- Country: Germany
- Language: German

Melusine is a 1944 German drama film directed by Hans Steinhoff and starring Olga Chekhova, Siegfried Breuer and Angelika Hauff.

The film's sets were designed by the art director Kurt Herlth and Robert Herlth. It was partly shot on location around Lake Wolfgang in Austria (then part of Nazi Germany).

== Cast ==
- Olga Chekhova as Nora
- Siegfried Breuer as Stefan Brock
- Angelika Hauff as Christine von Hardegg
- Friedrich Domin as Professor von Hardegg
- Lisa Siebel as Melitta Meyesenburg
- Franz Pfaudler as Praxmaier, Juwelier
- Hans Adalbert Schlettow as Keller, Chauffeur
- Gretl Rainer as Anna Zelch
- Wastl Witt as Martin Zelch
- Hans Alpassy as Michael Haider
- Hans Kratzer as Hufnagl, postman
- Herbert Gernot as Dr. Perotti
