= Thank You, I'm Fine =

1948 film

- Directed by: Erich Waschneck
- Written by: Gerhard T. Buchholz (play); Gustav Kampendonk
- Produced by: Hans von Wolzogen; Luggi Waldleitner
- Starring: Ernst von Klipstein; Karin Hardt; Sonja Ziemann
- Cinematography: Kurt Schulz
- Edited by: Elisabeth Kleinert-Neumann; Hermann Ludwig
- Music by: Werner Eisbrenner
- Production companies: Berlin Film; DEFA
- Distributed by: Internationale Filmallianz (Western zones); Sovexport Film (Eastern zone)
- Release date: 23 January 1948
- Running time: 74 minutes
- Country: Germany
- Language: German

Thank You, I'm Fine (German: Danke, es geht mir gut) is a 1948 German comedy film directed by Erich Waschneck and starring Ernst von Klipstein, Karin Hardt, and Sonja Ziemann. It is also known by the title A Lovely Family (German: Eine reizende Familie).

It was produced towards the end of the Second World War by the independent company Berlin Film. Left unfinished, it was finally completed by the Communist-controlled DEFA studio in the Soviet Zone and put on general release across Germany. It was one of a number of films of the Nazi era that had delayed releases in the years after the fall of the regime.

The film's sets were designed by the art directors Heinrich Beisenherz and Alfred Bütow.

== Synopsis ==
After their father's death his seven sons and daughters try to scare off any prospective tenants from taking over the large house.

== Cast ==
- Ernst von Klipstein as Tierarzt Dokter Höflin
- Karin Hardt as Martina Holk
- Sonja Ziemann as Irmgard Holk
- Gunnar Möller as Günther Holk
- Paul Henckels as Professor Sedelmann
- Ernst Legal as August Petri, genannt Muschel
- Heinz Lausch as Bertel Sedelmann
- Ernst Waldow as Mietskandidat
- Eleonor Hauf as Babsi Holk
- Herbert Stetza as Lauser Holk
- Lutz Moik as Otto Holk
- Hans Neie as Sohni Holk
- Aribert Wäscher as Mietskandidat
- Erna Sellmer as Köchin Anna
- Ursula Herking
- Ingrid Lutz
- Herbert Hübner
- Werner Pledath
- Hans Stiebner
- Eduard Bornträger
- Karl Heinz Wagner
- Elsa Wagner

== See also ==
- Überläufer

== Bibliography ==
- Rentschler, Eric (1996). The Ministry of Illusion: Nazi Cinema and Its Afterlife. Cambridge, MA: Harvard University Press. ISBN 978-0-674-57640-7.
