= Music in Salzburg =

1944 German comedy film

- Directed by: Herbert Maisch
- Written by: Otto Ernst Hesse; Hermann H. Ortner
- Produced by: Otto Lehmann
- Starring: Willy Birgel; Lil Dagover; Hans Nielsen
- Cinematography: Georg Krause
- Edited by: Gertrud Hinz-Nischwitz; Ursula Schmidt
- Music by: Alois Melichar
- Production company: Terra Film
- Distributed by: Deutsche Filmvertriebs
- Release date: 8 September 1944
- Running time: 106 minutes
- Country: Germany
- Language: German

Music in Salzburg (German: Musik in Salzburg) is a 1944 German comedy film directed by Herbert Maisch and starring Willy Birgel, Lil Dagover and Hans Nielsen.It was shot at the Babelsberg Studios in Berlin and on location around Salzburg. The film's sets were designed by the art director Max Mellin.

== Cast ==
- Willy Birgel as Anton Klinger
- Lil Dagover as Ursula Sanden
- Hans Nielsen as Dr. Franz Mädler
- Thea Weis as Elisabeth Häberlin
- Hans Olden as Jeremias Sauer
- Julia Serda as Helene Lohmeier
- Theodor Danegger as Portier Schöberl
- Karl Skraup as Hauptwachtmeister
- Egon von Jordan as Intendanzrat
- Josefine Dora as Köchin
- Joseph Egger as Parkwächter
- Erich Musil as Korner
- Georg Tressler as Paul Zeisig
- Werner Kurz as Huber
- Klara Moll as Zimmermädchen

== Bibliography ==
- Bock, Hans-Michael & Bergfelder, Tim. The Concise Cinegraph: An Encyclopedia of German Cinema. Berghahn Books, 2009.
- Klaus, Ulrich J. Deutsche Tonfilme: Jahrgang 1944. Klaus-Archiv, 1988.
