= One Night's Intoxication =

1951 film

- Directed by: Eduard von Borsody
- Written by: Harald Bratt (play)
- Produced by: Erwin Gitt
- Starring: Christl Mardayn; Richard Häussler; Paul Dahlke
- Cinematography: Friedl Behn-Grund
- Edited by: Max Michel
- Music by: Kurt Graunke
- Production company: Allegro-Film
- Distributed by: Siegel-Monopolfilm; Tirol-Film (Austria)
- Release date: 16 February 1951
- Running time: 100 minutes
- Country: West Germany
- Language: German

One Night's Intoxication (German: Rausch einer Nacht) is a 1951 West German romantic drama film directed by Eduard von Borsody and starring Christl Mardayn, Richard Häussler and Paul Dahlke. In Austria it was known by the title Alexa.

It was shot at the Bavaria Studios in Munich. The film's sets were designed by the art director Ernst H. Albrecht.

== Cast ==
- Christl Mardayn as Frau Siebel gen. Alexa
- Richard Häussler as Axel Peterson
- Paul Dahlke as Generaldirektor Siebel
- Gertrud Kückelmann as Inge Siebel, Musikstudentin
- Ulrich Beiger as Dr. Felix Fichtner
- Elise Aulinger as Johanna, Hausangestellte bei Siebel
- Fritz Reiff as Generaldirektor Wittemann
- Georg Vogelsang as Schäfer, Nachtportier
- Paul Henckels as Fritz, Oberkellner
- Herta Worell as Petra, Bardame
- Mady Rahl as Charlott, Bardame
- Margarete Slezak as Madame Yvonne

== Bibliography ==
- Goble, Alan (1999). The Complete Index to Literary Sources in Film. Walter de Gruyter. ISBN 978-3-11-095194-3.
