= King of Hearts (1947 film) =

1947 film

- Directed by: Helmut Weiss
- Written by: Helmut Weiss (play)
- Produced by: Artur Brauner; Günter Regenberg
- Starring: Hans Nielsen; Aribert Wäscher; Sonja Ziemann
- Cinematography: Robert Baberske
- Edited by: Walter Wischniewsky
- Music by: Gerhard Winkler
- Production company: CCC Film
- Distributed by: Internationale Filmallianz; Lloyd-Filmverleih; DEFA (Soviet zone)
- Release date: 25 August 1947
- Running time: 88 minutes
- Country: Allied-occupied Germany
- Language: German

King of Hearts (German: Herzkönig) is a 1947 German comedy film directed by Helmut Weiss and starring Hans Nielsen, Aribert Wäscher, and Sonja Ziemann. The film was the first production of Artur Brauner's CCC Films, which would later develop into a leading company in West German cinema. It was produced at the Tempelhof Studios in Berlin. The film's sets were designed by art director Ernst H. Albrecht. In the Soviet Zone of Germany, it was distributed by the state-owned company DEFA.

== Synopsis ==
King Michael XXXVII has a doppelganger, Peter Petroni, who often makes sly remarks about the monarchy. In his role as sovereign, Michael bans the Petroni's writing. However, when the monarch gets drunk and misses his wedding day, one of his officials recruits the lookalike Petroni to take his place.

== Cast ==
- Hans Nielsen as King Michael XXXVII / Peter Petroni
- Lisa Lesco as Königin
- Aribert Wäscher as Papupowitsch
- Wilhelm Bendow as Pupopawitsch
- Sonja Ziemann as Bianca
- Georg Thomalla as Leutnant
- Hannelore Bollmann as Juliane
- Undine von Medvey as Bellina
- Walter Bechmann as Istraki
- Walter Werner as Kammerdiener
- Erwin Biegel as Hoffriseur
- Curth Flatow as Musiklehrer
- Maria Oehmen
- Eva Preuß
- Horst Döring
- Adrian Hoven
- Joachim Link
- Kurt Reimann

== Bibliography ==
- Bergfelder, Tim (2005) [2004]. International Adventures: German Popular Cinema and European Co-Productions in the 1960s. New York: Berghahn Books. ISBN 978-1-57181-539-2.
