= I'll Make You Happy (1949 film) =

1949 West German comedy film

- Directed by: Sándor Szlatinay
- Written by: Tibor Yost
- Based on: I'll Make You Happy by Gábor Vaszary
- Produced by: Heinz Rühmann; Alf Teichs
- Starring: Heinz Rühmann; Hertha Feiler; Dorit Kreysler
- Cinematography: Erich Claunigk
- Edited by: Gertrud Hinz-Nischwitz
- Music by: Werner Bochmann
- Production company: Comedia-Film
- Distributed by: Schorcht Filmverleih
- Release date: 2 December 1949
- Running time: 92 minutes
- Country: West Germany
- Language: German

I'll Make You Happy (German: Ich mach dich glücklich) is a 1949 West German comedy film directed by Sándor Szlatinay and starring Heinz Rühmann, Hertha Feiler and Dorit Kreysler. It was shot at the Bavaria Studios in Munich. The film's sets were designed by the art directors Ernst H. Albrecht and Rolf Zehetbauer.

== Cast ==
- Heinz Rühmann as Peter Krüger
- Hertha Feiler as Barbara
- Karl Schönböck as Viktor
- Dorit Kreysler as Vera
- Hans Leibelt as Herr Meinert
- Margarete Haagen as Frau Geheimrat
- Lotte Stein as Veras Mutter
- Fritz Kampers as Veras Vater
- Rudolf Schündler as Herr Stock
- Jochen Hauer as Herr Stöger
- Gunnar Möller as Franz
- Harald Mannl as Chef vom Dienst
- Margot Trooger as Waitress

== Bibliography ==
- Goble, Alan. The Complete Index to Literary Sources in Film. Walter de Gruyter, 1999.
- Körner, Torsten. Der kleine Mann als Star: Heinz Rühmann und seine Filme der 50er Jahre. Campus Verlag, 2001.
