= Eyes of Love (1951 film) =

1951 film

- Directed by: Alfred Braun
- Written by: Alfred Braun; Veit Harlan
- Produced by: Veit Harlan; Erich Holder
- Starring: Käthe Gold; René Deltgen; Paul Wegener
- Cinematography: Reimar Kuntze
- Edited by: Walter Fredersdorf
- Music by: Wolfgang Zeller
- Production company: UFA
- Distributed by: Imperial Film
- Release date: 26 October 1951
- Running time: 99 minutes
- Country: West Germany
- Language: German

Eyes of Love (German: Augen der Liebe) is a 1951 West German drama film directed by Alfred Braun and starring Käthe Gold, René Deltgen and Paul Wegener, in his last film three years after his death.

The screenplay was written by the director Veit Harlan. Harlan developed the project, but then turned over direction to his friend Braun.

The film was a wartime production, which began shooting in 1942 and was completed in 1944. Planned for a 1945 release, it was blocked by Joseph Goebbels who found the quality poor and disliked the fact that much of it was set in hospitals. It was eventually given a belated post-war release in 1951. By the time it was released, several of its cast members had died.

The film's sets were designed by the art directors Wilhelm Depenau and Alfred Tolle.

== Cast ==
- Käthe Gold as Schwester Agnes
- René Deltgen as Günther Imhoff
- Paul Wegener as Prof. Mochmann
- Hans Schlenck as Dr. Lamprecht
- Ilse Petri as Milo Thiele
- Rudolf Schündler as Dr. Bertram
- Mady Rahl as Gerda Schirmer
- Albert Florath as Laboratoriumsdiener
- Maria Koppenhöfer as Oberschwester
- Gertrud Spalke
- Marina Werner-Papke
- Walter Pentzlin

== Bibliography ==
- Noack, Frank. Veit Harlan: The Life and Work of a Nazi Filmmaker. University Press of Kentucky, 2016.
