= Gustl Gstettenbaur =

German actor (1914–1996)

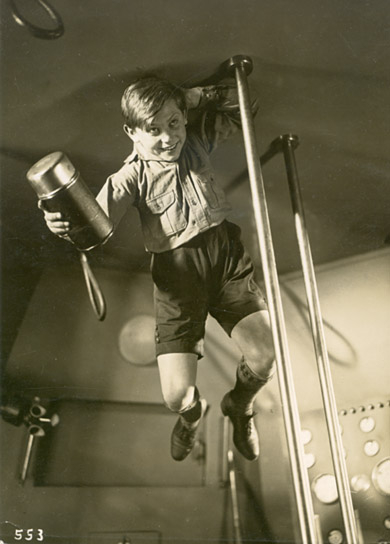
- Gstettenbaur in a scene of Woman in the Moon (1929)
- Born: August Ludwig Gstettenbaur; 1 March 1914; Straubing, Bavaria, Germany
- Died: 20 November 1996 (aged 82); Bad Hindelang, Bavaria, Germany
- Other names: Gustl Stark-Gestettenbaur; Gustl Stark-Gstettenbauer; Gustl Stark-Gstettenbaur
- Occupation: Actor
- Years active: 1927–1990

Gustl Gstettenbaur (1 March 1914 – 20 November 1996) was a German stage, film and television actor.

Born in Bavaria, Gustl Gstettenbaur began his career onstage as a child actor in 1927, at the age of thirteen. He went on to play a variety of juvenile roles in German films during the late silent film era. Gstettenbaur's career continued as an adult on stage, film and in television.

== Selected filmography ==
- The Page Boy at the Golden Lion (1928) - Peter Pohlmann, Piccolo
- Spione (1928) - Boy Who Helps No. 326 (uncredited)
- Band of Thieves (1928)
- Volga Volga (1928) - Kolka
- Fight of the Tertia (1929) - Borst
- Woman in the Moon (1929) - Gustav
- Big City Children (1929)
- The Mistress and her Servant (1929) - Hans
- The Eccentric (1929) - Uhrmacherlehrling Toni
- Delicatessen (1930) - Lehrling
- Vienna, City of Song (1930) - Gustl, Pikkolo
- Die zärtlichen Verwandten (1930) - Webers Sohn
- Dolly Gets Ahead (1930) - Boy
- Kohlhiesel's Daughters (1930) - Gustl, Pikkolo
- Madame Pompadour (1931) - Ein kleiner Kadett
- Schubert's Dream of Spring (1931) - Schani, Piccolo in der 'Höldrichsmühle'
- Queen of the Night (1931)
- The Wrong Husband (1931)
- Elisabeth of Austria (1931)
- Der Storch streikt (1931) - Lehrling
- Errant Husbands (1931) - Emil, Lietzows Neffe
- The Night Without Pause (1931) - Bürolehrling bei Stieglitz
- Im Banne der Berge (1931)
- Girls to Marry (1932) - Willi, sein Bruder
- Spoiling the Game (1932) - Gustl Spengler - sein Sohn
- Paprika (1932) - Dienstjunge
- The Secret of Johann Orth (1932) - Der Pikkolo
- The Peak Scaler (1933) - Ein Pikkolo
- The Sandwich Girl (1933) - Paul, Lehrling
- Wedding at Lake Wolfgang (1933) - Peterl, sein jüngerer Bruder
- At the Strasbourg (1934) - Joggeli
- You Are Adorable, Rosmarie (1934) - Peperl, Piccolo im 'Almblick'
- At Blonde Kathrein's Place (1934) - Der Kellnerjunge in der Goldenen Gans
- Jungfrau gegen Mönch (1934) - Fritz, Hotelpage
- An Evening Visit (1934) - Ein Bürobote
- Ihr größter Erfolg (1934)
- The Bird Seller (1935)
- Kampf um Kraft (1935)
- Soldaten - Kameraden (1936) - Tupfinger - ein Bayer
- Home Guardsman Bruggler (1936) - Bartl Theissbacher
- The Hunter of Fall (1936) - Toni Donhart
- Das Schweigen im Walde (1937) - Pepi Praxmaler
- Musketier Meier III (1938) - Kriegsfreiwilliger Staden
- Frau Sixta (1939)
- Der Edelweißkönig (1939) - Gidi
- Sommer, Sonne, Erika (1939)
- Der laufende Berg (1941) - Schorsch, der Daxenschmied
- Die heimlichen Bräute (1942) - Ludwig
- The Violin Maker of Mittenwald (1950) - Ludwig
- Border Post 58 (1951) - Grenzjäger Mitterer
- Die Alm an der Grenze (1951) - Ferdl
- The Last Shot (1951) - Jäger Martin
- Heimatglocken (1952)
- The Village Under the Sky (1953) - Schmuggler Toni
- Open Your Window (1953)
- Marriage Strike (1953)
- Wenn ich einmal der Herrgott wär (1954) - Franzl Bergmüller
- Unternehmen Edelweiß (1954) - Hardei
- The Song of Kaprun (1955) - Gustl Feller, Kranführer
- The Blacksmith of St. Bartholomae (1955) - Max
- The Dark Star (1955) - Micky
- Silence in the Forest (1955) - Beppi Braxlmaler
- In Hamburg When the Nights Are Long (1956)
- Liebe, Schnee und Sonnenschein (1956) - Kurt Berger, sein Freund
- Her Corporal (1956)
- Melody of the Heath (1956) - Sepp
- Der Schandfleck (1956) - Thomas
- War of the Maidens (1957) - Pecher
- Der Edelweißkönig (1957) - Gidi, Jäger
- Der Pfarrer von St. Michael (1957) - Simmerl
- Jägerblut (1957) - Bastl / Sebastian
- The Cow and I (1959) - Deutscher Soldat (uncredited)
- Drei weiße Birken (1961)
- Vor Jungfrauen wird gewarnt (1962) - Friedrich
- The Merry Wives of Tyrol (1964) - Hotelchef Simmering
- Wiener Schnitzel (1967)
- Stolen Heaven (1974) - Förster Auer (final film role)

== Bibliography ==
- Richards, Jeffrey. Visions of Yesterday. Routledge & Kegan Paul, 1973.
