= Richard Häussler =

German actor (1908–1964)

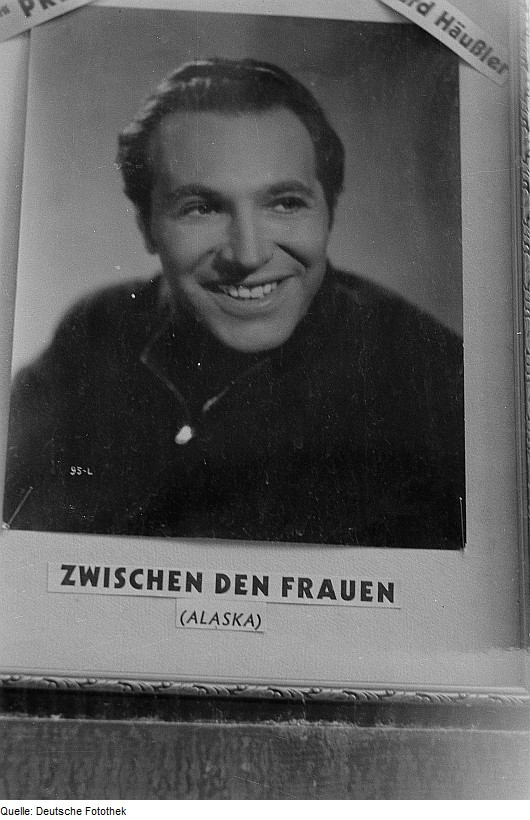
- Born: 26 October 1908; Munich, German Empire
- Died: 28 September 1964 (aged 55); Grünwald, West Germany
- Occupations: Actor, film director
- Years active: 1936-1964

Richard Häussler (26 October 1908 – 28 September 1964) was a German actor and film director. He appeared in more than 60 films between 1936 and 1964. He also directed seven films between 1951 and 1957. He was born in Munich, Bavaria, German Empire and died in Grünwald, West Germany.

== Selected filmography ==
- The Unsuspecting Angel (1936)
- Die große und die kleine Welt (1936)
- Spiel auf der Tenne (1937) - Martin Jöchler
- Der Schimmelkrieg in der Holledau (1939)
- The Sensational Casilla Trial (1939) - Adams, öffentlicher Ankläger
- Maria Ilona (1939) - Ludwig Kossuth
- Ursula Under Suspicion (1939) - Bankangestellter Kißling
- The Fox of Glenarvon (1940) - Major McKenney
- The Girl at the Reception (1940) - Dr. Groner
- Was wird hier gespielt? (1940)
- Im Schatten des Berges (1940) - Aloys Zumtobel
- The Comedians (1941) - Armin von Perckhammer
- Her Other Self (1941) - Ingenieur Partzke
- Secret File W.B.1 (1942) - Großfürst Konstantin
- Violanta (1942) - Marianus Renner
- Fünftausend Mark Belohnung (1942) - Krasselt
- Liebe, Leidenschaft und Leid (1943) - Paul
- Heaven, We Inherit a Castle (1943)
- The Second Shot (1943) - Georg von Romberg
- The Bath in the Barn (1943) - Sartorius - Kaufherr aus Wien
- The Black Robe (1944) - Uwe Boddin, Maler
- Schicksal am Strom (1944) - Heinrich Stahlschmidt, Kapitän der 'Wallenstein'
- Dir zuliebe (1944) - Lorenz von Niel
- Eines Tages (1945)
- Rätsel der Nacht (1945)
- Wozzeck (1947) - Tambour-Major
- Beate (1948) - Felix Wendlandt
- The Lost Face (1948) - Robert Lorm
- Girls Behind Bars (1949) - Breuhaus
- The Prisoner (1949) - Pierre
- Madonna in Chains (1949) - Professor Wienholt
- Das Geheimnis des Hohen Falken (1950) - Zeska, Bildhauer
- The Rabanser Case (1950) - Polizeikommissar Schelling
- One Night's Intoxication (1951) - Axel Peterson
- Desire (1951) - Robert von Raviguy
- Die Alm an der Grenze (1951) - Sepp
- Christoph (1951)
- The Cloister of Martins (1951)
- Die schöne Tölzerin (1952) - Oberst Trenck
- They Call It Love (1953) - Erich Conti
- Arena of Death (1953) - Diego Moreno
- The Village Under the Sky (1953)
- Your Heart Is My Homeland (1953)
- The Red Prince (1954) - Dr. Orbis
- Das Fräulein von Scuderi (1955) - Miossens
- When the Alpine Roses Bloom (1955) - Philipp Klockenhoff
- Der Adler vom Velsatal (1957)
- Precocious Youth (1957) - Herr Rau
- The Csardas King (1958) - Graf Riedern
- U 47 – Kapitänleutnant Prien (1958) - German U-Boat Fleet Commander
- Es war die erste Liebe (1958) - Prof. Hans Lauterbach
- Aus dem Tagebuch eines Frauenarztes (1959) - Rudi Baum
- Zurück aus dem Weltall (1959) - Prof. Robert
- The Strange Countess (1961) - Chesney Praye
- The Strangler of Blackmoor Castle (1963) - Dr. Tromby
- The Indian Scarf (1963) - Dr. Amersham
- Room 13 (1964) - Joe Legge
- If You Go Swimming in Tenerife (1964) - Erik Varnhagen
- Five Thousand Dollars on One Ace (1965) - Dundee
