= Will Quadflieg =

German actor (1914–2003)

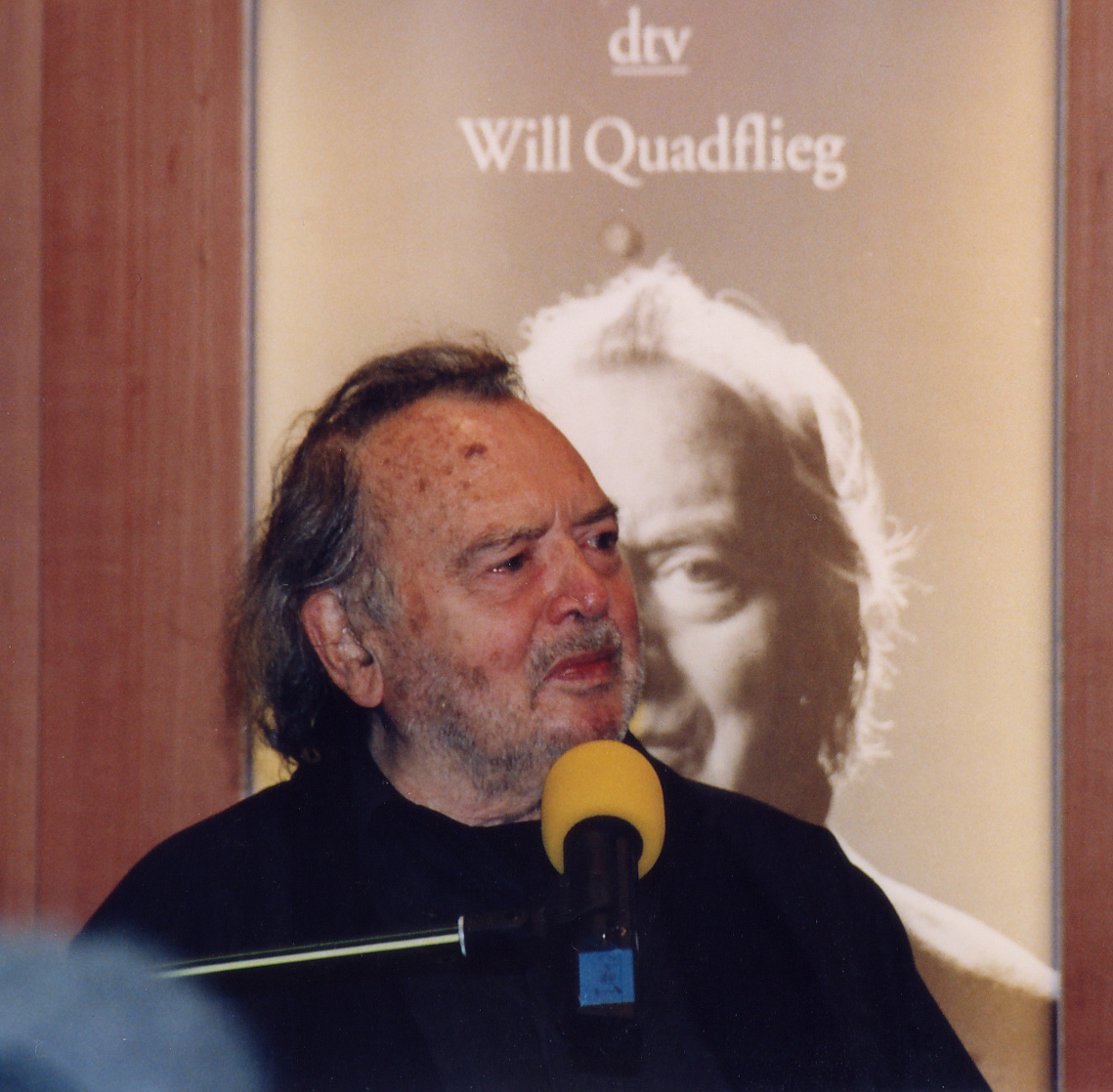
Quadflieg in 1998

Friedrich Wilhelm "Will" Quadflieg (German: [vɪl ˈkvat.fliːk]; 15 September 1914 – 27 November 2003) was a German actor from Oberhausen. He was the father of actor Christian Quadflieg. He is considered one of Germany's best post-war actors. One of his most widely recognized roles was in the title role in the 1960 film Faust. He also starred in a number of other roles. Quadflieg died from a pulmonary embolism.

== Filmography ==
- 1938: The Muzzle - Rabanus, maler
- 1940: Das Herz der Königin - Olivier
- 1940: Kora Terry - Michael Varany
- 1941: My Life for Ireland - Michael O'Brien jun
- 1942: Destiny - Dimo
- 1942: The Red Terror - Peter Aßmuss
- 1942: Der große Schatten - Robert Jürgensen
- 1944: Die Zaubergeige - Violinist Andreas Halm
- 1944: Philharmonic - Alexander Schonath
- 1945: Anna Alt - Joachim Alt, ein Komponist
- 1950: The Lie - Harry Altenberger
- 1951: The Deadly Dreams - Winter / Barravas / Florestan
- 1951: Das ewige Spiel - Werner Donatus
- 1951: Dark Eyes - Fedor Varany
- 1952: The Forester's Daughter - Joseph Földessy aka Hauptmann Koltai
- 1953: Don't Forget Love - Paul Cornelius
- 1953: Heartbroken on the Moselle - Dr. Thomas Arend
- 1955: Lola Montès - Franz Liszt
- 1956: San Salvatore - Dr. Manfred Carrell
- 1960: Faust - Dr. Heinrich Faust / Dichter
- 1969: Kamasutra: Vollendung der Liebe - Narrator (voice)
- 1979-1994: Derrick (TV Series) - Prof. Braun-Gorres / Robert Schreiber
- 1981: Dantons Tod (TV Movie) - Thomas Payne
- 1986: The Journey - Vater Voss
- 1993: The Great Bellheim (TV Mini-Series) - Herbert Sachs
- 1994: Der gute Merbach (TV Movie) - Clemens Merbach
- 1999: Dr. Robert Schumann, Teufelsromantiker (TV Movie) - Rezitator (final film role)
