= René Deltgen =

Luxembourgish actor (1909–1979)

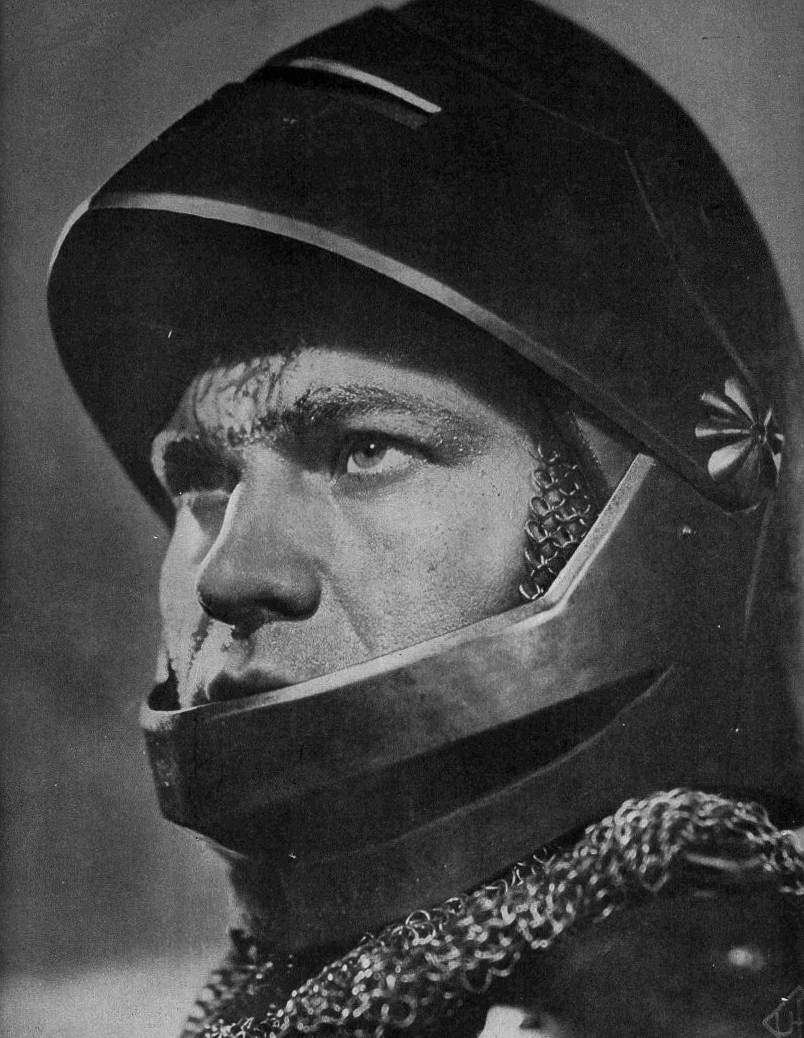

Renatus Heinrich Deltgen (30 April 1909 in Esch-sur-Alzette, Luxembourg – 29 January 1979 in Cologne, West Germany) was a Luxembourgish stage and film actor, who spent most of his career in Germany.

== Biography ==
Deltgen was the son of the chemist Mathias Deltgen and his wife Katharina, née Pütz. After graduating from high school, he went to Cologne in 1927 to attend the drama school there. From 1931 to 1934 he gained stage experience at the Städtische Bühnen Köln. He had his first successes in the play Der Graue by Friedrich Forster. After a one-year engagement at the Städtische Bühnen Frankfurt, he got his first film role at UFA in 1935 in Das Mädchen Johanna, a film about Joan of Arc.

Until 1944 he played on various stages in Berlin and appeared in numerous films. His parade roles were those of the charming lover or the unscrupulous adventurer. German cultural policy in Luxembourg, which was annexed by Germany, attempted to represent Deltgen during the Second World War as a type of Luxembourgish who had established himself in the Reich; in 1939 he was appointed a state actor. In 1944, Deltgen was on the Gottbegnadeten list of the Reich Ministry for Popular Enlightenment and Propaganda. Posters on which he promoted the entry of Luxembourg youth into the Hitler Youth offended the population's former pride in Luxembourg's best-known actor. Even in the post-war years, his compatriots did not forgive him for collaborating with the Germans. In 1945/46, therefore, there was a much-publicized trial against Deltgen in Luxembourg for treason. The sentence was two years in prison, a fine of 100,000 francs and the loss of his Luxembourg nationality, which was, however, restored to him in 1952. He had to serve only part of the prison sentence.

== Selected filmography ==
- Das Mädchen Johanna (1935) – Maillezais
- One Too Many on Board (1935) – I. Offizier Rohlfs
- Savoy Hotel 217 (1936) – Sergei Gavrilovitch Schuvalov
- Port Arthur (1936) – Ivamoura, Youki's brother
- Under Blazing Heavens (1936) – Groppi
- Starke Herzen (1937) – Viktor
- Urlaub auf Ehrenwort (1938) – Grenadier Emil Sasse
- Secret Code LB 17 (1938) – Lieutenant Robby Glawar
- Schwarzfahrt ins Glück (1938) – Werkstatter Rudi Winkler
- Northern Lights (1938) – Olaf Hansen
- Rubber (1938) – Henry Wickham
- After Midnight (1938) – Fedor
- The Green Emperor (1939) – Jan Karsten
- Twelve Minutes After Midnight (1939) – Niels Terström
- Congo Express (1939) – Gaston Thibault
- Brand im Ozean (1939) – Tom Finberg
- The Three Codonas (1940) – Alfredo Codona
- Achtung! Feind hört mit! (1940) – Karl Ludwg Färber
- Das leichte Mädchen (1940) – Student Brutus
- My Life for Ireland (1941) – Robert Devoy
- Spähtrupp Hallgarten (1941) – Hannes Hallgarten
- The Big Game (1942) – Mittelstürmer Werner Fehling
- Attack on Baku (1942) – Percy Forbes, Chef der englischen Agenten
- Front Theatre (1942) – Dr. Paul Meinhardt
- Doctor Crippen (1942) – Düwell
- Whom the Gods Love (1942) – Ludwig van Beethoven
- Circus Renz (1943) – Ernst Renz
- When the Young Wine Blossoms (1943) – Kapitän Tonning
- Summer Nights (1944) – Dr. Thomas
- The Wedding Hotel (1944) – Viktor Hoffmann, Pressephotograph
- Wir beide liebten Katharina (1945)
- The Silent Guest (1945) – Matthias Radscheck
- Tromba (1949) – Kurt Tromba, Tigerdompteur
- Keepers of the Night (1949) – Stefan Gorgas
- Blondes for Export (1950) – Frank Olman
- Tobias Knopp – Abenteuer eines Junggesellen (1950) – Förster Knarrtje (voice)
- Eyes of Love (1951) – Günther Imhoff
- Torreani (1951) – Robert Torreani
- Desires (1952) – Dr. med. Steininger
- Under the Thousand Lanterns (1952) – Kommissar Dr. Hennings
- No Way Back (1953) – Major Kazanow
- Stars Over Colombo (1953) – Lakamba
- The House on the Coast (1954) – Beppo
- The Prisoner of the Maharaja (1954) – Lakamba
- The Man of My Life (1954) – Nils Ascan
- The Last Summer (1954) – Gawan Massi
- Spring Song (1954) – Eduard Fabricius
- The Phantom of the Big Tent (1954) – Alfredo Capelli, der Direktor
- Special Delivery (1955) – Kovak
- Hotel Adlon (1955) – Gravic
- Without You All Is Darkness (1956) – Charly Justin
- The House of Intrigue (1956) – Hermann
- Queen Louise (1957) – Napoleon
- The Tiger of Eschnapur (1959) – Prince Ramigani
- The Indian Tomb (1959) – Prince Ramigani
- Der Hexer (1964) – Henry Arthur 'Der Hexer' Milton
- Golden Goddess of Rio Beni (1964) – Bernard
- Neues vom Hexer (1965) – Arthur Milton
- The Doctor Speaks Out (1966) – Dr. Diener
- Slap in the Face (1970) – Wan Tan, Chinese
- Christmas Not Just Once a Year (1970, TV film) – Uncle Franz
- Das Messer (1971, TV miniseries) – Philip Cooper
- Die Herausforderung (1975, TV film) – Paul Sander
- Die Affäre Lerouge (1976, TV film) – Tabaret
- Scrounged Meals (1977) – Schiller
- Schwarz und weiß wie Tage und Nächte (1978, TV film) – Lindford
- Heidi (1978, TV series) – Grandfather
