= Helmut Weiss =

German actor, filmmaker

- Born: 25 January 1907; Göttingen, Lower Saxony; German Empire
- Died: 13 January 1969 (aged 61); West Berlin, West Germany
- Occupations: Actor, screenwriter, film director
- Years active: 1935–1969

Helmut Weiss (January 25, 1907 – January 13, 1969) was a German actor, screenwriter, and film director. He was notable for directing Tell the Truth, the first film produced after the Second World War in what was to become West Germany . It was made in Hamburg in the British Zone of Occupation. Much of the film had already been made at the UFA studios in Berlin shortly before the arrival of the Red Army, but Weiss dramatically re-shot it. The film was significant in its use of outdoor locations in common with other post-war rubble films.

== Selected filmography ==
=== Actor ===
- Trouble Backstairs (1935)
- Scandal at the Fledermaus (1936)
- Back in the Country (1936)
- The Merry Wives (1936)
- Family Parade (1936)
- Nanon (1938)
- Kitty and the World Conference (1939)
- The Leghorn Hat (1939)
- The Girl from Fano (1941)
- The Gasman (1941)
- Rembrandt (1942)
- Love and Trumpets (1954)
- Oasis (1955)
- Fanny Hill (1964)

=== Screenwriter ===
- I Entrust My Wife to You (1943)
- Hello, Fraulein! (1949)
- Beloved Liar (1950)
- Street Serenade (1953)
- Santa Lucia (1956)
- Paradise for Sailors (1959)

=== Director ===
- Die Feuerzangenbowle (1944)
- Quax in Africa (not completed during the Reich; allied ban in 1945; shown in West Germany in 1953)
- Tell the Truth (1946)
- King of Hearts (1947)
- Tromba (1949)
- Don't Dream, Annette (1949)
- The Secret of the Red Cat (1949)
- The Disturbed Wedding Night (1950)
- My Friend the Thief (1951)
- The Secret of a Marriage (1951)
- Once on the Rhine (1952)
- Hubertus Castle (1954)
- Love and Trumpets (1954)
- The First Day of Spring (1956)
- Engagement at Wolfgangsee (1956)
- Lemke's Widow (1957)
- An American in Salzburg (1958)
- Every Day Isn't Sunday (1959)
- Rendezvous in Vienna (1959)
- Three Men in a Boat (1961)

== Bibliography ==
- Kreimeier, Klaus (1999). The Ufa Story: A History of Germany's Greatest Film Company, 1918–1945. Berkeley: University of California Press. ISBN 978-0-520-22069-0.
