= List of German films of 1934 =

This is a list of the most notable films produced in the Cinema of Germany in 1934.

== A–L ==
Title	Director	Cast	Genre	Notes
Adventure on the Southern Express	Erich Waschneck	Charlotte Susa, Karl Ludwig Diehl, Ralph Arthur Roberts	Thriller	
At Blonde Kathrein's Place	Franz Seitz	Liane Haid, Thea Aichbichler, Fred Hennings	Comedy	
At the Strasbourg	Franz Osten	Hans Stüwe, Ursula Grabley, Carl de Vogt	Comedy	
Bashful Felix	Carl Boese	Rudolf Platte, Ursula Grabley, Jakob Tiedtke	Comedy	
Between Heaven and Earth	Franz Seitz	Rudolf Klein-Rogge, Attila Hörbiger, Karin Hardt	Drama	
Between Two Hearts	Herbert Selpin	Harry Liedtke, Luise Ullrich, Olga Chekhova	Drama	
The Big Chance	Victor Janson	Hansi Niese, Hans Söhnker, Camilla Horn	Musical comedy	
The Black Whale	Fritz Wendhausen	Emil Jannings, Angela Salloker, Max Gülstorff	Drama	
The Brenken Case	Carl Lamac	Walter Steinbeck, Hans Brausewetter, Rudolf Klein-Rogge	Crime comedy	
The Champion of Pontresina	Herbert Selpin	Sepp Rist, Rudolf Klicks, Annie Markart	Comedy	Co-production with Switzerland
Charley's Aunt	Robert A. Stemmle	Fritz Rasp, Albert Lieven, Carola Höhn	Comedy	
Count Woronzeff	Arthur Robison	Albrecht Schoenhals, Hansi Knoteck, Willy Birgel	Drama	
The Cousin from Nowhere	Georg Zoch	Lien Deyers, Lizzi Holzschuh, Paul Heidemann	Operetta	
The Csardas Princess	Georg Jacoby	Mártha Eggerth, Hans Söhnker, Paul Kemp	Musical	
The Daring Swimmer	Georg Jacoby	Ralph Arthur Roberts, Susi Lanner, Elga Brink	Comedy	
Decoy	Hans Steinhoff	Viktor de Kowa, Jessie Vihrog, Jakob Tiedtke	Adventure	
The Double	E.W. Emo	Georg Alexander, Camilla Horn, Gerda Maurus	Crime comedy	
The Double Fiance	Martin Frič	Lien Deyers, Fritz Kampers, Carsta Löck	Comedy	Co-production with Czechoslovakia
Elisabeth and the Fool	Thea von Harbou	Hertha Thiele, Theodor Loos, Rudolf Klein-Rogge	Drama	
The English Marriage	Reinhold Schünzel	Renate Müller, Adolf Wohlbrück, Adele Sandrock	Comedy	Die englische Heirat
Enjoy Yourselves	Hans Steinhoff	Dorit Kreysler, Ida Wüst, Wolfgang Liebeneiner	Musical comedy	
Es tut sich was um Mitternacht	Robert A. Stemmle	Leopoldine Konstantin, Dolly Haas, Albert Lieven	Comedy	
An Evening Visit	Georg Jacoby	Liane Haid, Paul Hörbiger, Harald Paulsen	Comedy	
Farewell Waltz	Géza von Bolváry	Wolfgang Liebeneiner, Richard Romanowsky, Hanna Waag	Drama	
Financial Opportunists	Fritz Kampers	Weiss Ferdl, Sabine Peters, Hans Adalbert Schlettow	Comedy	
The Flower Girl from the Grand Hotel	Carl Boese	Elsa Merlini, Georg Alexander, Hans Brausewetter	Drama	
The Four Musketeers	Heinz Paul	Fritz Kampers, Paul Westermeier, Erhard Siedel	Drama	
The Fugitive from Chicago	Johannes Meyer	Gustav Fröhlich, Luise Ullrich, Lil Dagover	Crime	
A Girl Whirls By the World	Georg Jacoby	Magda Schneider, Harald Paulsen, Theo Lingen	Comedy	
The Girlfriend of a Big Man	Paul Wegener	Käthe von Nagy, Karl Ludwig Diehl, Jessie Vihrog	Comedy	
Gold	Karl Hartl	Hans Albers, Michael Bohnen, Brigitte Helm	Science fiction, drama	
The Grand Duke's Finances	Gustaf Gründgens	Viktor de Kowa, Hilde Weissner, Heinz Rühmann	Comedy	
Gypsy Blood	Charles Klein	Georg Alexander, Grit Haid, Margit Symo	Comedy	
Hanneles Himmelfahrt	Thea von Harbou	Inge Landgut, Rudolf Klein-Rogge, Käte Haack		
Hard Luck Mary	Erich Engel	Jenny Jugo, Friedrich Benfer, Willi Schur	Comedy	
Hearts are Trumps	Carl Boese	Jenny Jugo, Paul Hörbiger, Käthe Haack	Comedy	
Heinz in the Moon	Robert A. Stemmle	Heinz Rühmann, Annemarie Sörensen, Rudolf Platte	Comedy	
Holiday From Myself	Hans Deppe	Hermann Speelmans, Carola Höhn, Georg H. Schnell	Comedy	
Hubertus Castle	Hans Deppe	Friedrich Ulmer, Hansi Knoteck, Arthur Schröder	Drama	
I for You, You for Me	Carl Froelich	Ruth Eweler, Karl Dannemann, Carl de Vogt	Drama	
I Don't Know You and I Love You	Géza von Bolváry	Magda Schneider, Willi Forst, Max Gülstorff	Romance	
The Island	Hans Steinhoff	Brigitte Helm, Willy Fritsch, Hubert von Meyerinck	Thriller	
Just Once a Great Lady	Gerhard Lamprecht	Käthe von Nagy, Wolf Albach-Retty, Gretl Theimer	Comedy	
The Last Waltz	Georg Jacoby	Camilla Horn, Ernst Dumcke, Iván Petrovich	Operetta	
The Legacy of Pretoria	Johannes Meyer	Paul Hartmann, Charlotte Susa, Paul Henckels	Drama	
Little Dorrit	Carl Lamac	Anny Ondra, Gustav Waldau, Hilde Hildebrand	Drama	
The Lost Valley	Edmund Heuberger	Mathias Wieman, Marieluise Claudius, Harry Hardt	Drama	
Love and the First Railway	Robert Neppach	Jakob Tiedtke, Ida Wüst, Karin Hardt	Comedy	
Love Conquers All	Georg Zoch	Trude Marlen, Susi Lanner, Carl Esmond	Comedy	
Love, Death and the Devil	Heinz Hilpert, Reinhart Steinbicker	Käthe von Nagy, Brigitte Horney, Albin Skoda	Drama	

== M–Z ==
Title	Director	Cast	Genre	Notes
A Man Wants to Get to Germany	Paul Wegener	Karl Ludwig Diehl, Brigitte Horney, Hans Leibelt	Action	
Master of the World	Harry Piel	Walter Janssen, Sybille Schmitz, Walter Franck	Science fiction	
Miss Liselott	Johannes Guter	Magda Schneider, Albert Lieven, Willi Schur	Comedy	
Miss Madame	Carl Boese	Paul Hörbiger, Jenny Jugo, Olga Limburg	Comedy	
Mother and Child	Hans Steinhoff	Henny Porten, Peter Voß, Elisabeth Wendt	Drama	
Music in the Blood	Erich Waschneck	Leo Slezak, Hanna Waag, Sybille Schmitz	Drama	
My Heart Calls You	Carmine Gallone	Jan Kiepura, Mártha Eggerth, Paul Kemp	Musical	
Paganini	E.W. Emo	Iván Petrovich, Eliza Illiard, Theo Lingen	Musical	
Pappi	Arthur Maria Rabenalt	Viktor de Kowa, Hilde Weissner, Petra Unkel	Comedy	
Peer Gynt	Fritz Wendhausen	Hans Albers, Lucie Höflich, Marieluise Claudius	Drama	
Playing with Fire	Ralph Arthur Roberts	Paul Hörbiger, Trude Marlen, Elga Brink	Comedy	
Police Report	Georg Jacoby	Olga Chekhova, Paul Otto, Johannes Riemann	Mystery	
Polish Blood	Carl Lamac	Anny Ondra, Hans Moser, Iván Petrovich	Musical	Co-production with Czechoslovakia
Princess Turandot	Gerhard Lamprecht	Käthe von Nagy, Willy Fritsch, Leopoldine Konstantin	Comedy	
The Princess's Whim	Karl Hartl; Henri-Georges Clouzot	Albert Préjean, Marie Bell, Armand Bernard	Comedy	French-language film
The Prodigal Son	Luis Trenker	Luis Trenker, Maria Andergast, Marian Marsh	Drama	
The Rider on the White Horse	Hans Deppe, Curt Oertel	Marianne Hoppe, Mathias Wieman	Drama	
Rivals of the Air	Frank Wysbar	Claus Clausen, Wolfgang Liebeneiner, Sybille Schmitz	Drama	
The Riders of German East Africa	Herbert Selpin	Sepp Rist, Ilse Stobrawa, Rudolf Klicks	War	
Roses from the South	Walter Janssen	Paul Hörbiger, Gretl Theimer, Rózsi Csikós	Musical	
So Ended a Great Love	Karl Hartl	Paula Wessely, Willi Forst, Gustaf Gründgens	Historical	
Song of Farewell	Albert Valentin, Géza von Bolváry	Janine Crispin, Jean Servais, Lucienne Le Marchand	Drama	French-language
The Sporck Battalion	Rolf Randolf	Fritz Genschow, Werner Schott, Theodor Loos	Drama	
Spring Parade	Géza von Bolváry	Franciska Gaal, Wolf Albach-Retty, Paul Hörbiger	Co-production with Austria	
Such a Rascal	Robert A. Stemmle	Heinz Rühmann, Ellen Frank, Annemarie Sörensen	Comedy	
The Sun Rises	Willy Reiber	Charles Kullmann, Fritz Kampers, Jessie Vihrog	Musical	
The Switched Bride	Karel Lamac	Anny Ondra, Anton Walbrook, Fritz Odemar	Comedy	
The Tannhof Women	Franz Seitz	Rudolf Klein-Rogge, Paul Richter, Ursula Grabley	Drama	
Trouble with Jolanthe	Carl Froelich	Wilhelm P. Krüger, Marianne Hoppe, Marieluise Claudius	Romantic comedy	
The Two Seals	Fred Sauer	Weiß Ferdl, Walter Steinbeck, Georgia Lind	Comedy	
The Voice of Love	Victor Janson	Marcel Wittrisch, Maria Beling, Marieluise Claudius	Musical	
Volldampf voraus!	Carl Froelich	Hans Junkermann, Karl Ludwig Diehl, Karl Dannemann	Comedy	
What Am I Without You	Arthur Maria Rabenalt	Wolfgang Liebeneiner, Betty Bird, Olga Chekhova	Musical	
William Tell	Heinz Paul	Hans Marr, Conrad Veidt, Emmy Göring	Historical	Co-production with Switzerland
A Woman Who Knows What She Wants	Victor Janson	Lil Dagover, Anton Walbrook, Anton Edthofer	Musical	
A Woman with Power of Attorney	Arzén von Cserépy	Gerda Maurus, Ernst Dumcke, Hans Adalbert Schlettow	Drama	
The World Without a Mask	Harry Piel	Harry Piel, Olga Chekhova, Rudolf Klein-Rogge	Thriller	
You Are Adorable, Rosmarie	Hans von Wolzogen	Herta Worell, Hans Stüwe, Hans Adalbert Schlettow	Comedy	
The Young Baron Neuhaus	Gustav Ucicky	Viktor de Kowa, Käthe von Nagy, Hans Moser	Historical	

== Documentaries ==
Title	Director	Cast	Genre	Notes
Auf den Spuren der Hanse	Walter Hege		documentary	
Flammen der Vorzeit	Walter Fischer		propaganda	
Gestalte mit Licht	Ulrich Kayser		documentary	
Heilende Hände	Eberhard Frowein		documentary	
Heimat am Meer	Oleg Woinoff		documentary	
In Jesu Dienst	Gertrud David		documentary	
Die letzten Segelschiffe	Heinrich Hauser		documentary	
Malaria	Ulrich Kayser		documentary	
Mit der Emden um die Welt	Gottfried Krüger		documentary	
Segensspuren der Liebe	Gertrud David		documentary	
Unser Führer – Des Reiches Wiedergeburt			propaganda	Available online here
Unser deutscher Zeppelin – Eine deutsche Erfindung, auf der wir Stolz sind.			documentary	
Von Königsberg bis Berchtesgaden	Otto Trippel		documentary	
Von der deutschen Scholle zur deutschen Hausfrau	Hermann Boehlen		documentary	
Der Walfisch II. Verarbeitung	Arnold Fanck		documentary	
Wir wandern mit den Ostgermanen	Walter Fischer		propaganda	

== Shorts ==
Title	Director	Cast	Genre	Notes
Der Firmling		Karl Valentin, Liesl Karlstadt		
Das Gestohlene Herz	Lotte Reiniger		Animated	
Im Schallplattenladen	Hans H. Zerlett	Karl Valentin, Liesl Karlstadt	slapstick/comedy	one of Valentin's classics based on his idea; In the Record (LP) Shop
Das Lied von der Mühle	Bernhard Huth, Wintzer von Tresckow		animation	
Den lystige radio-trio			animation	co-production with Norway
Muratti greift ein	Oskar Fischinger		Animation	
Onkel Theodor amüsiert sich	Bernhard Huth, Wintzer von Tresckow		animation	
Rivers and Landscapes	Oskar Fischinger		Animation	
Quadrate	Oskar Fischinger		Animation	
Ein Spiel in Farben	Oskar Fischinger		Animation	
Um das Menschenrecht	Hans Zoberlein	Hans Schlenck, Kurt Holm, Ernst Martens, Beppo Brem		For the Rights of Man; Anti-Communism propaganda paying homage to the Freikorps
