= Scandal at the Fledermaus =

- Directed by: Herbert Selpin
- Written by: Herbert Selpin; Walter Zerlett-Olfenius
- Produced by: Guido Bagier; Martin Pichert
- Starring: Viktor de Kowa; Maria Andergast; Adele Sandrock
- Cinematography: Emil Schünemann
- Edited by: Lena Neumann
- Music by: Ernst Leenen
- Production company: Tofa Tonfilm-Fabrikations
- Distributed by: Terra Film
- Release date: 4 June 1936
- Running time: 82 minutes
- Country: Germany
- Language: German

Scandal at the Fledermaus (German: Skandal um die Fledermaus) is a 1936 German comedy film directed by Herbert Selpin and starring Viktor de Kowa, Maria Andergast and Adele Sandrock. It was shot at the Terra Studios in Berlin. The film's sets were designed by the art director Erich Czerwonski. It was partly shot on location in London. It is also known by the alternative title Scandal Over Mary.

== Synopsis ==
A bat flies into a young English lady's bedroom, leading to string of misunderstandings.

== Cast ==
- Viktor de Kowa as Viktor Kendal
- Maria Andergast as Mary Hill
- Adele Sandrock as Lady Bethy Malison
- Heinz Salfner as Sir Thomas Berkham
- Ernst Dumcke as Sir Anthony Garring
- Alfred Abel as Patrick, Butler
- Erich Fiedler as Jonny Dunn
- Eliza Illiard as Evelyne Dixon
- Max Gülstorff as Die Exzellenz
- Roma Bahn as Lady X
- Eva Tinschmann as Lady Y
- Hedi Heising as Luise
- Helmut Weiss as Diener
- Ernst Stimmel as Kanzleidiener
- Horst Teetzmann as Boy
- Fred Goebel as Gast
- Achim von Biel as Gast
- Alfred Pussert as Gast

== Bibliography ==
- Bergfelder, Tim & Bock, Hans-Michael. The Concise Cinegraph: Encyclopedia of German. Berghahn Books, 2009.
- Klaus, Ulrich J. Deutsche Tonfilme: Jahrgang 1936. Klaus-Archiv, 1988.
- Rentschler, Eric. The Ministry of Illusion: Nazi Cinema and Its Afterlife. Harvard University Press, 1996.
