= Hubert von Meyerinck =

German actor

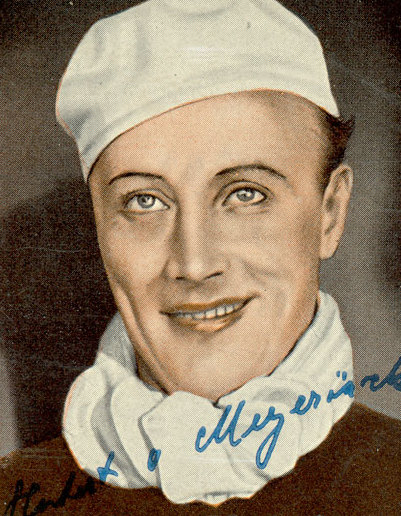
- Hubert von Meyerinck (1933)
- Born: 23 August 1896; Potsdam, Germany
- Died: 13 May 1971 (aged 74); Hamburg, West Germany
- Occupation: Actor
- Years active: 1917–1971

Hubert "Hubsi" von Meyerinck (23 August 1896 – 13 May 1971) was a German film actor. He appeared in more than 280 films between 1921 and 1970.

== Biography ==
Meyerinck was born in Potsdam, Brandenburg, the son of Friedrich von Meyerinck (1858–1928), Hauptmann (Captain) in the Prussian Army. He grew up at his family's estates in the Province of Posen and attended the gymnasium secondary school in Godeberg. Having passed his Abitur exams, he was called up for military service as a cadet in World War I, but soon was dismissed due to a pulmonary disease.

In 1917 he gave his debut as a theatre actor at the Schauspielhaus in Berlin and from 1918 to 1920 continued his career at the Hamburg Kammerspiele. Back in Berlin he performed in avant-garde plays by Carl Sternheim, as well as in several revue entertainments and kabarett venues. Later he returned to classical theatre with engagements at the Deutsches Theater and the Lessing Theater, performing as The Imaginary Invalid, Mephistopheles, but also as Captain of Köpenick or as Meckie Messer in Brecht's Threepenny Opera.

From 1920 onwards, Meyerinck starred as a silent film actor, whereby he developed a distinctive appearance with his high forehead and moustache, often emphasizing his hypnotic expression by sporting a monocle. He was able to continue his career in the sound film era by his unmistakable rasping voice, which perfectly added to his physiognomy, having a standing order for scoundrels and charlatan roles.

Commonly identified as a homosexual, he ran the risk of being imprisoned by the Nazi authorities like his friend Kurt von Ruffin; nevertheless, he performed in numerous entertainment films of Nazi cinema. After World War II, Meyerinck remained one of the busiest film actors in West German cinema. He starred as quirky official, devious noble or impostor in numerous film comedies, often together with Peter Alexander and young Ilja Richter but also in several Edgar Wallace films of the 1960s. The magazine Der Spiegel called Meyernick's role in numerous films a "comical Erich von Stroheim, who parodied Prussianism and made it ridiculous". He also continued as a theatre actor, from 1966 in the ensemble of the Thalia Theater in Hamburg.

Hubert von Meyernick made one of his few Hollywood film appearances in Billy Wilder's film satire One, Two, Three (1961), portraying in a memorable supporting role the penniless aristocrat Count Waldemar von und zu Droste-Schattenburg, who adopts Horst Buchholz for financial reasons. Meyernicks skills in English were rather limited, so he was dubbed by German-American character actor Sig Ruman. The Jewish Billy Wilder spoke about Meyernick in a 1997 interview with Der Spiegel: "I remember a gay actor, we called him Hubsi, Hubert von Meyernick. He never vaunted himself for that, but during the Kristallnacht he went along the Kurfürstendamm and called: If somebody among you is Jewish, follow me! He cached the people in his apartment. Yes, there were decent people, whose words you could believe, that it was hard to do resistance during that time. People like Meyernick were marvelous, wonderful."

Meyerinck died from heart failure in Hamburg. He is buried in the Schladen cemetery near Braunschweig.

== Filmography ==
- Desire (1921) as Minor Role
- Peter Voss, Thief of Millions (1921, part 1–7) as Gehilfe von Mann mit der Narbe
- The Lost Shoe (1923) as Minor Role
- Manon Lescaut (1926) as The Younger Bli
- People to Each Other (1926) as Feinschmecker
- The Flames Lie (1926) as Ein Liebhaber
- Aftermath (1926) as Heino
- Doña Juana (1928) as Dichter Don Alfonso
- The Old Fritz (1928, part 2) as Graf Cobenzl
- Beating Heart (1928) as 3. Ehemann
- Under the Lantern (1928) as Gustave Nevin
- The First Kiss (1928) as James Twist
- The Secret Courier (1928) as Duc d'Orléans
- The Burning Heart (1929) as Unknown Role
- Diane (1929) as Tichon, Kammerdiener
- The Model from Montparnasse (1929) as Sleeper conductor
- Triumph of Love (1929) as Flemming
- Jenny's Stroll Through Men (1929) as Lorenz, Modezeichner
- Three Around Edith (1929) as Scherbe
- Ludwig II, King of Bavaria (1930) as Unknown Role
- Love's Carnival (1930) as Benno von Klewitz - Leutnant
- The Flute Concert of Sanssouci (1930) as Attaché
- The Sacred Flame (1931) as (uncredited)
- The Theft of the Mona Lisa (1931) as Museumsführer
- My Wife, the Impostor (1931)
- The Schlemihl (1931) as Baron Stechling
- The Company's in Love (1932) - Fritz Willner as Filmautor
- For Once I'd Like to Have No Troubles (1932) as Görner - Friseurgehilfe
- Der schwarze Husar (1932) as Koch Darmonts
- The White Demon (1932) as Marquis d'Esquillon
- Contest (1932) as Schneckendorf
- When Love Sets the Fashion (1932) as Mr. Farell
- The Empress and I (1933) as Flügeladjutant
- Manolescu, Prince of Thieves (1933) as Der Kellner im Hotel Ritz
- Die Nacht der großen Liebe (1933) as Konsulatssekretär
- Ein gewisser Herr Gran (1933) as Hauptmann Gordon
- Ein Unsichtbarer geht durch die Stadt (1933) as 3. Gast Lissys
- Dream of the Rhine (1933) as Conny
- Her Highness the Saleswoman (1933) as Paul
- Young Dessau's Great Love (1933) as Graf von Syringen
- The Only Girl (1933)
- Tambour battant (1933)
- The Fugitive from Chicago (1934) as Werner Dux
- The World Without a Mask (1934) as E.W. Costa
- Frühlingsmärchen (1934) as Karlchen Wolf, Librettist aus Finsterwalde
- The Big Chance (1934) as Georg, ihr Sohn
- The Island (1934) as Graf Squeelen, erster Botschaftsrat
- A Woman Who Knows What She Wants (1934) as Lynge, Bankier
- I Marry My Wife (1934) as Prof. Mertens
- She and the Three (1935) as André Nicol
- The Cat in the Bag (1935) as Louis Grevenelle
- Winter Night's Dream (1935) as Degenfels
- Everything for a Woman (1935) as Maxwell, ein dunkler Ehrenmann
- Ein falscher Fuffziger (1935) as Wallner, Betrüger
- Barcarolle (1935) as Lopuchin
- Ein Mädel aus guter Familie (1935) as Direktor Hollmann
- Last Stop (1935) as Marcel Steiner, Direktor des Salon 'Flora'
- Ein ganzer Kerl (1935) as Baron von Petersen
- The King's Prisoner (1935) as Von Beichlingen
- If It Were Not for Music (1935) as Kusjmitsch von Prschitschkin
- April, April! (1935) as Müller, Reisender
- Königstiger (1935) as Vicomte d'Aubert
- Hangmen, Women and Soldiers (1935) as Rittmeister Lensberg
- Es flüstert die Liebe (1935) as Lenoir
- Paul and Pauline (1936) as Apotheker Knullingen
- Stjenka Rasin (1936) as Borodin
- Family Parade (1936) as Vetter Max
- Orders Are Orders (1936) as Rittmeister von Schlackberg
- Fräulein Veronika (1936) as Theo
- Thou Art My Joy (1936) as Dr.Hofreuter - Lawyer
- Game on Board (1936) as Marquis de la Tour
- The Voice of the Heart (1937) as Kammerdiener der Prinzessin
- The Happiest Married Couple in Vienna (1937) as Oskar Brenner
- Don't Promise Me Anything (1937) as Dr. Elk
- Strife Over the Boy Jo (1937) as Monsieur Merminod
- The Irresistible Man (1937) as Marquis de Rossignol
- An Enemy of the People (1937) as Redakteur Fink
- Fanny Elssler (1937) as Polizeipräfekt
- After Midnight (1938) as Ricin
- Frühlingsluft (1938) as Graf Rasumirksi
- Anna Favetti (1938) as Hotelgast
- The Deruga Case (1938) as Riedmüller
- So You Don't Know Korff Yet? (1938) as Reporter Droste (uncredited)
- The Night of Decision (1938) as Chef des Modesalons
- Women for Golden Hill (1938) as Tanzmanager
- Bel Ami (1939) as Redakteur Varenne
- The Leghorn Hat (1939) as Rosalba
- Salonwagen E 417 (1939) as Kuhlemanns Komplize
- Hello Janine! (1939) as Jean
- Wibbel the Tailor (1939) as Knillich
- Kitty and the World Conference (1939) as Carter
- Robert Koch (1939) as Fähnrich Graf
- A Woman Like You (1939) as Verkäufer im Sportgeschäft
- Maria Ilona (1939) as Pizzi, der Scherenschnittkünstler
- We Danced Around the World (1939) as 2. Theaterdirektor in Stockholm
- Der Weg zu Isabel (1940) as Bü-Bü
- Passion (1940) as Graf Christian
- Her Private Secretary (1940) as Auktionator
- Angelika (1940) as Kabarett-Direktor
- The Star of Rio (1940) as Monsieur Louis Borinage
- Golowin geht durch die Stadt (1940)
- Die Rothschilds (1940) as Baron Vitrolles
- Trenck the Pandur (1940) as Herr von Sazenthal
- Das Herz der Königin (1940) as Sir John - d*er englische Gesandte
- Kora Terry (1940)
- Die keusche Geliebte (1940) as Ballettmeister Petit
- Venus on Trial (1941) as Dr.Knarre, Sachverständiger
- Mistress Moon (1941) as Rat Haschke
- Was geschah in dieser Nacht (1941) as Werner Gebhardt
- Two in a Big City (1942)
- Weiße Wäsche (1942)
- Der große Schatten (1942) as Voß, Schauspieler
- Diesel (1942) as Herr von Lorrenz (uncredited)
- Ein Zug fährt ab (1942) as Frisör Schön
- Münchhausen (1943) as Prince Anton Ulrich
- Light of Heart (1943) as Möllendorf
- Ich habe von dir geträumt (1944) as Empfangschef
- Der Mann, dem man den Namen stahl (1944) as Max Vieregg
- Shiva und die Galgenblume (1945)
- Das Mädchen Juanita (1945) as Verwandter des Konsul Henselings
- Tell the Truth (1946)
- In the Temple of Venus (1948) as Raimondo
- The Adventures of Fridolin (1948) as Der falsche Biedermann
- The Court Concert (1948)
- Blocked Signals (1948) as Der Baron
- The Great Mandarin (1949) as Chinesischer Staatsbeamter
- Love '47 (1949) as Direktor Engelbrecht
- Amico (1949) as Schwarz, Oberkellner
- Nothing But Coincidence (1949) as Schönheitssaloninhaber
- Artists' Blood (1949) as Ricardo Pisetti - Manager
- Kätchen für alles (1949) as Ein Herr
- The Murder Trial of Doctor Jordan (1949) as Wedekind
- The Blue Straw Hat (1949) as Ciapollini
- Der große Fall (1949) as Ein dunkler Ehrenmann
- Unknown Sender (1950) as Schmoll, Lehrer
- Who Is This That I Love? (1950) as Zauberer
- Kein Engel ist so rein (1950) as Mohrbutter
- My Niece Susanne (1950) as Oscar, Friseur
- The Reluctant Maharaja (1950) as Knirps - Generalsekretärs des Wunderfriseurs
- Love on Ice (1950) as Hoteldirektor Schabratzky
- The Man in Search of Himself (1950) as Direktor Cattoni
- Trouble in Paradise (1950)
- The Disturbed Wedding Night (1950) as Frank Betterton, Lawyer
- The Girl from the South Seas (1950)
- Die Sterne lügen nicht (1950) as Baron v. Malachowsky alias Emil Branske
- A Rare Lover (1950) as Poule, Verlege
- The Midnight Venus (1951) as Director Meyer
- Woe to Him Who Loves (1951) as Neumann
- Engel im Abendkleid (1951)
- Hilfe, ich bin unsichtbar (1951) as Professor Orsini
- Das späte Mädchen (1951) as Buchhändler
- The Dubarry (1951) as Stranitzky, Schmierendirektor
- The Colourful Dream (1952) as Brandini
- The Thief of Bagdad (1952) as Hussa Hussa
- Klettermaxe (1952) as Dobnika
- That Can Happen to Anyone (1952) as Walputzke
- Weekend in Paradise (1952) as Empfangschef
- I'm Waiting for You (1952) as Studienrat Schwarze
- Beautiful Night (1952) as Maroni, Theaterdirektor
- We'll Talk About Love Later (1953) as Herr Wilmar, Inhaber Kosmetik-Salon
- Heute nacht passiert's (1953) as Textilkaufmann Schulz
- Knall and Fall as Detectives (1953) as Stapler
- They Call It Love (1953) as Balancourt
- Not Afraid of Big Animals (1953) as Kunstreiter
- Fanfare of Marriage (1953) as Hornisse
- The Bogeyman (1953) as Hoteldirektor
- Columbus Discovers Kraehwinkel (1954)
- Maxie (1954) as Felix, Diener
- Keine Angst vor Schwiegermüttern (1954)
- Ten on Every Finger (1954) as Director des Lido
- Marriage Impostor (1954) as Meister Philippe
- The Missing Miniature (1954) as Tänzer
- The Blue Danube (1955) as Baron Philipp
- Music, Music and Only Music (1955) as Bieberich
- The Spanish Fly (1955)
- Ball at the Savoy (1955) as Max
- Love, Dance and a Thousand Songs (1955) as Director Winkler
- The Forest House in Tyrol (1955) as von Langer, Staatsanwalt
- Die Wirtin zur Goldenen Krone (1955) as Weckenberg
- IA in Oberbayern (1956) as Diener Fritz
- Die wilde Auguste (1956) as Baron von Freitag
- Dany, bitte schreiben Sie (1956) as Geschäftsführer Schnattke
- The Stolen Trousers (1956) as Signore Ricoli
- Hilfe - sie liebt mich (1956) as Direktor der "Elysée-Bar
- Küß mich noch einmal (1956) as Direktor Landinger
- The Captain from Köpenick (1956) as (uncredited)
- Santa Lucia (1956) as Tutu
- Zu Befehl, Frau Feldwebel (1956) as Kriegsgerichtsrat Kronberg
- Manöverball (1956) as Hauptmann Brothusen
- Sommerliebe am Bodensee (1957) as Oberkelalner
- Tolle Nacht (1957) as Herr Lemke, Schauspieler
- Tired Theodore (1957) as Wilhelm Schulze
- Two Bavarians in the Jungle (1957) as Jawassis
- Das Glück liegt auf der Straße (1957) as Generaldirektor Kartzer
- Siebenmal in der Woche (1957) as Füllkrug
- The Mad Bomberg (1957) as Pfarrer
- Weißer Holunder (1957) as Taddäus von Zylinski
- Träume von der Südsee (1957) as Kapitän
- Vacanze a Ischia (1957) as Colonnello Manfredi
- Heute blau und morgen blau (1957) as Sanitätsrat Schlucker
- Europas neue Musikparade 1958 (1957) as Wuttke
- Ferien auf Immenhof (1957) as Dr. Westkamp
- The Spessart Inn (1958) as Polizeimajor
- Und abends in die Scala (1958) as Alfons Spadolini
- Rosemary (1958) as Kleye
- The Csardas King (1958) as Szegedy
- The Star of Santa Clara (1958) as Freddy
- Piefke, der Schrecken der Kompanie (1958) as Fürst Paul XIII. von Krakelsburg-Kummerstein
- Love, Girls and Soldiers (1958) as Major von Siebenstern
- Die Seeteufel von Angostura (1958)
- Skandal um Dodo (1959) as Graf Udo von Pleitenstein
- La Paloma (1959) as Direktor Bauer
- Bobby Dodd greift ein (1959)
- Melodie und Rhythmus (1959) as Orlando / Himself
- The Merry War of Captain Pedro (1959) as Moritz von Persipan, Kriegsminister
- The Man Who Walked Through the Wall (1959) as Pickler - der Bürochef
- Salem Aleikum (1959) as Polizeichef Pierre Duval
- The Man in the Black Derby (1960) as Chef der russischen Atomdelegation
- The Haunted Castle (1960)as - Oberregierungsrat von Teckel / Obrist von Teckel
- Sabine und die 100 Männer (1960) as Herzog
- Schlußakkord (1960)
- Mein Mann, das Wirtschaftswunder (1961)
- Festival (1961)
- The Adventures of Count Bobby (1961) as Mr. Cower
- The Secret Ways (1961) as Hermann Sheffler
- Junge Leute brauchen Liebe (1961) as Monsieur Terrier
- Ein Stern fällt vom Himmel (1961) as Adv. Diffenthal
- Davon träumen alle Mädchen (1961) as Schulrat
- Robert and Bretram (1961) as Kriminalkommissar Wolf
- One, Two, Three (1961) as Count von Droste Schattenburg
- Freddy and the Millionaire (1961) as Direktor Walloschek
- The Turkish Cucumbers (1962) as Rubin y Soliman
- Der verkaufte Großvater (1962) as Friedrich Wilhelm Dünkelberg
- Das ist die Liebe der Matrosen (1962) as Freiherr von Mumpitz
- So toll wie anno dazumal (1962) as Mandler
- When the Music Plays at Wörthersee (1962) as Axel Bender, Evelyns Vater
- Wedding Night in Paradise (1962) as Gustav Säuerling, Bonbonfabrikant
- Black-White-Red Four Poster (1962) as Oberst Pusslitz
- The Bandit and the Princess (1962) as Herr von Merlyn
- Das Kriminalmuseum: Fünf Fotos (1963, TV Series) as Rittmeister a.D. von Rellstab
- Tomfoolery in Zell am See (1963) as Hauptmann Hans Hajo von Gestern
- ...denn die Musik und die Liebe in Tirol (1963) as Oskar Ortshaus
- The Girl from the Islands (1964) as Direktor Dingelmeyer
- DM-Killer (1965) as Chief Prosecutor
- Neues vom Hexer (1965) as Judge Matthews
- Ich kauf' mir lieber einen Tirolerhut (1965) as Hubert Krempe
- The Sinful Village (1966) as Anwalt
- The Hunchback of Soho (1966) as General Edward Perkins
- Brille und Bombe - Bei uns liegen Sie richtig! (1967) as Der Hoteldirektor
- Frank V (1967, TV film) as Frank V
- Glorious Times at the Spessart Inn (1967) as General Teckel
- When Ludwig Goes on Manoeuvres (1967) as von Below
- Im Banne des Unheimlichen (1968) as Sir Arthur
- Otto ist auf Frauen scharf (1968) as Dr. Zwyfalt
- The Gorilla of Soho (1968) as Sir Arthur
- Donnerwetter! Donnerwetter! Bonifatius Kiesewetter (1969) as Felix, Dekanatsfaktotum
- The Man with the Glass Eye (1969) as Sir Arthur
- Ein dreifach Hoch dem Sanitätsgefreiten Neumann (1969) as Oberstabsarzt Dr. Treppwitz
- Charley's Uncle (1969) as Most
- Dr. Fabian: Laughing Is the Best Medicine (1969) as General von Kottwitz
- When the Mad Aunts Arrive (1970) as Herr Storz
- Keine Angst Liebling, ich pass schon auf (1970) as Portier vom Hotel Central
- Nachbarn sind zum Ärgern da (1970) as Notar
