= Girls of Today (1933 film) =

1933 film directed by Herbert Selpin

- Directed by: Herbert Selpin
- Written by: Charlie Roellinghoff; Robert A. Stemmle
- Based on: Das Mädchen am Steuerknüppel by Hans Richter
- Produced by: Frank Clifford; Helmut Schreiber
- Starring: Viktor de Kowa; Annie Markart; Oscar Sabo
- Cinematography: Carl Drews; Albert Kling
- Music by: Gerhard Mohr
- Production company: Matador-Film
- Release date: 30 November 1933
- Country: Germany
- Language: German

Girls of Today (German: Mädels von heute) is a 1933 German comedy film directed by Herbert Selpin and starring Viktor de Kowa, Annie Markart and Oscar Sabo. The film's sets were designed by the art director Willi Herrmann.

== Cast ==
- Viktor de Kowa as Peter Udde
- Lily Rodien as Synnöve Heidecker
- Leni Sponholz as Inge Overhoff
- Annie Markart as Greta Priano
- Oscar Sabo as Jurmann
- Aribert Mog as Kaunitz
- Henry Lorenzen as Olaf Hendersen
- F.W. Schröder-Schrom as Stefan Heidecker
- Lilo Hartmann as Lotte
- Günther Vogdt as Nunne
- Rudolf Klicks as Krümel
- Paul Henckels
- Oscar Joost as Musikkapelle
- Gustav Püttjer
- Dolly Raphael
- Heinrich Schroth

== Bibliography ==
- Rentschler, Eric. The Ministry of Illusion: Nazi Cinema and Its Afterlife. Harvard University Press, 1996.
- Klaus, Ulrich J. Deutsche Tonfilme: Jahrgang 1933. Klaus-Archiv, 1988.
