= Every Day Isn't Sunday =

Every Day Isn't Sunday (German: Alle Tage ist kein Sonntag) may refer to:

- Every Day Isn't Sunday, a song composed by Carl Clewing
- Every Day Isn't Sunday (1935 film), a German film directed by Walter Janssen
- Every Day Isn't Sunday (1959 film), a West German film directed by Helmut Weiss
