= If It Were Not for Music =

1935 film directed by Carmine Gallone

- Directed by: Carmine Gallone
- Written by: Ernst von Wolzogen (novel); Fred Andreas; Philipp Lothar Mayring
- Starring: Paul Hörbiger; Willi Schaeffers; Ida Wüst
- Cinematography: Reimar Kuntze
- Edited by: Waldemar Gaede
- Music by: Alois Melichar
- Production companies: Fabrikation Deutscher Filme; Tobis Film
- Distributed by: Tobis Film
- Release date: 26 September 1935
- Running time: 89 minutes
- Country: Germany
- Language: German

Wenn die Musik nicht wär (English: If It Were Not for Music) is a 1935 German drama film directed by Carmine Gallone and starring Paul Hörbiger, Willi Schaeffers and Ida Wüst. The film was shot at the Grunewald Studios in Berlin. It is based on the novel Der Kraft-Mayr by Ernst von Wolzogen. The film's art direction was by Fritz Maurischat and Karl Weber.

== Plot ==
Renowned and influential Franz Liszt assists a piano instructor who is facing difficulties and lacks worldly experience. Liszt aids the tutor in securing a prestigious role in Munich while also protecting him from a malevolent foreign rival who seeks to win over the tutor's beloved.

== Cast ==
- Paul Hörbiger as Florian Mayr, genannt 'Kraft-Mayr'
- Willi Schaeffers as Konsul Burmeester
- Ida Wüst as Seine Frau
- Karin Hardt as Thekla, seine Tochter
- Sybille Schmitz as Ilonka Badacz
- Harry Hardt as Baron Poldi
- Luis Rainer as Franz Liszt
- Annemarie Steinsieck as Gräfin Tockenburg
- Herta Worell as Dirigentin des Damenorchesters
- Josefine Dora as Olga, Theklas Kindermädchen
- Emmy Wyda as Frau Stoltenhagen
- Hubert von Meyerinck as Kusjmitsch von Prschitschkin
- Wolf Ackva
- Rudolf Biebrach
- Max Ernst
- Hugo Flink
- Erich Heyn
- Helga Kalkum
- Günther Langenbeck
- Morvilius
- Karl Morvilius
- Otto Sauter-Sarto
- Walter Schramm-Duncker
- Max Wilmsen

== Bibliography ==
- Klaus, Ulrich J. Deutsche Tonfilme: Jahrgang 1933. Klaus-Archiv, 1988.
