= Otto Sauter-Sarto =

German actor (1884–1958)

- Born: 29 April 1884; Munich, German Empire
- Died: 19 January 1958 (aged 73); East Berlin, East Germany
- Occupation: Actor
- Years active: 1908-1956

Otto Sauter-Sarto (29 April 1884 – 19 January 1958) was a German stage and film actor. He appeared in 70 films between 1920 and 1956.

== Selected filmography ==
- Lumpaci the Vagabond (1922)
- Katharina Knie (1929)
- The Blue of Heaven (1932)
- At the Strasbourg (1934)
- The Voice of Love (1934)
- Love Conquers All (1934)
- You Are Adorable, Rosmarie (1934)
- The Cousin from Nowhere (1934)
- What Am I Without You (1934)
- Roses from the South (1934)
- All Because of the Dog (1935)
- The Valiant Navigator (1935)
- Make Me Happy (1935)
- If It Were Not for Music (1935)
- Artist Love (1935)
- Love Can Lie (1937)
- The Scoundrel (1939)
- A Woman Like You (1939)
- The Right to Love (1939)
- The Way to Freedom (1941)
- The Swedish Nightingale (1941)
