= Will Meisel =

German composer

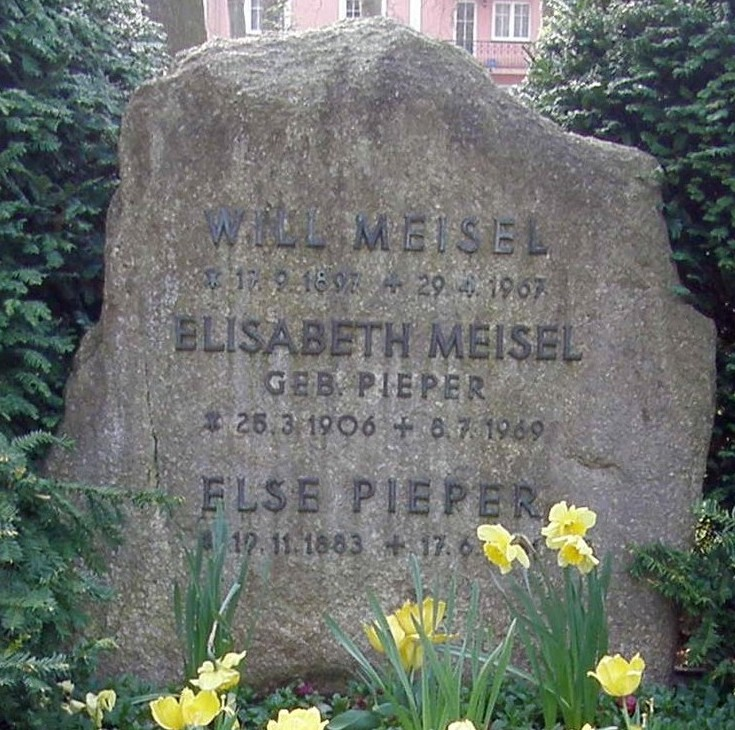
- Grave of Will Meisel, Berlin-Wilmersdorf
- Born: 17 September 1897; Berlin, German Empire
- Died: 29 April 1967 (aged 69); Müllheim, Baden-Württemberg; West Germany
- Occupation: Composer
- Years active: 1930-1955 (film)

Will Meisel (17 September 1897 – 29 April 1967) was a German composer, who wrote more than fifty film scores during his career. He also wrote several operettas including A Friend So Lovely as You (1930) (Eine Freundin so goldig wie du). In 1926, he founded German music publisher Edition Meisel & Co.

He was a member of the Nazi Party from 1933. He benefitted from the Nazi policy of aryanisation, buying the Alexander Haus for a quarter of its value, after its owners, the Alexander family, had fled the country. After the Second World War, his application for denazification was rejected, and he was barred from running his business until 1951. His life is described in The House by the Lake (2015) by Thomas Harding, a non-fiction book about the Alexander House and the families who lived there.

== Selected filmography ==
- The Other (1930)
- The Prosecutor Hallers (1930)
- Love in the Ring (1930)
- By a Nose (1931)
- A Storm Over Zakopane (1931)
- When the Soldiers (1931)
- The Unknown Guest (1931)
- Checkmate (1931)
- A Crafty Youth (1931)
- Queen of the Night (1931)
- At Your Orders, Sergeant (1932)
- The Four from Bob 13 (1932)
- Tugboat M 17 (1933)
- What Am I Without You (1934)
- The Sun Rises (1934)
- The Champion of Pontresina (1934)
- Gypsy Blood (1934)
- Every Day Isn't Sunday (1935)
- Trouble Backstairs (1935)
- Fräulein Veronika (1936)
- Family Parade (1936)
- Carousel (1937)
- Little County Court (1938)
- Marriage in Small Doses (1939)
- Queen of the Night (1951)
- The Inn on the Lahn (1955)

== See also ==
- Meisel Music

== Bibliography ==
- Grange, William. Cultural Chronicle of the Weimar Republic. Scarecrow Press, 2008.
