= Fred Delmare =

German actor

Werner Vorndran (24 April 1922 – 1 May 2009), known professionally as Fred Delmare, was a German actor.

== Life and work ==
Werner Vorndran was the son of a carpenter and a seamstress and grew up in Hüttensteinach at Sonneberg in Thuringia, where as an adolescent he appeared on a peasant stage. After his time in the Volksschule he learned the trade of a tool and die maker. As military volunteer he went to the marine in Bremerhaven. At the local municipal theatre he took his first drama lessons with the theatre manager Karl-Georg Saebisch 1940 and 1941 and worked as background actor in an operette production. During his military service he suffered a severe abdominal injury, for that he was cured until the end of war.

1946 he went to Weimar and got drama lessons with Walter Jupé at the local national theatre. Since then he bears the artist name Fred Delmare. From 1947 to 1950 Delmare as external pupil finished the drama school of the Hebbel theatre in West Berlin. His debut he gave there 1947 as Vansen in Egmont. 1950 he transferred to the Schauspielhaus Leipzig, of that he was a member until 1970.

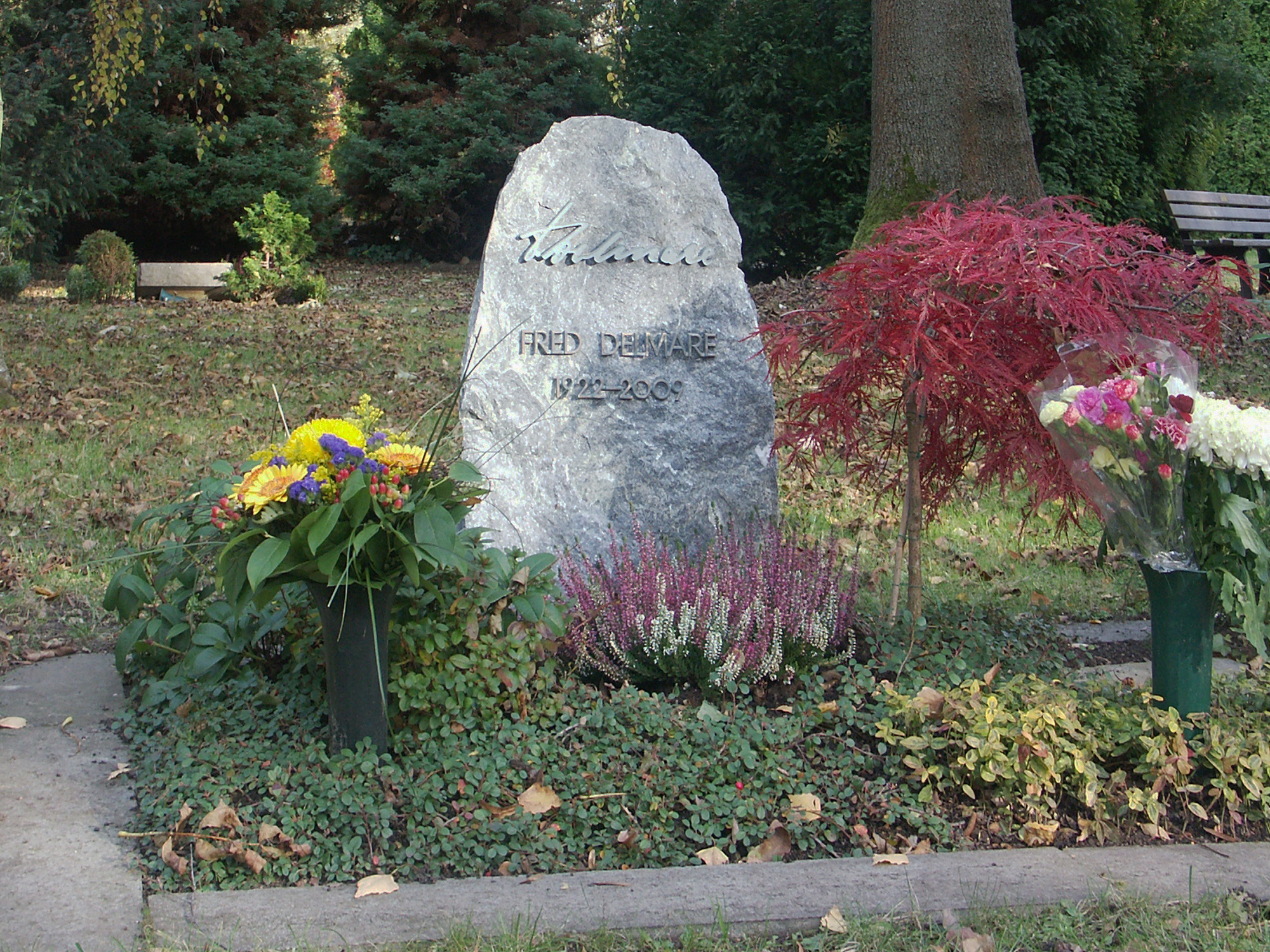
His grave in the Leipzig South Cemetery

The 1 meter 60 cm tall Delmare become famous primarily for his roles in more than 200 films. In his 50-year career he played roles like Pippig in Naked Among Wolves, the tire dealer Saft in The Legend of Paul and Paula and Enno Kluge in Every Man Dies Alone. With these roles Delmare became one of the most popular film actors in the GDR. In the 1990s he appeared increasingly in TV series, including in Lindenstraße, in Unser Charly and as Friedrich Steinbach in In aller Freundschaft. His actor career ended in November 2005 with a day of shooting for the series In aller Freundschaft. This last episode with Delmare as Grandpa Friedrich was broadcast on 31 January 2006. In December 2005 it became known that he was suffering from Alzheimer's disease, and from the beginning of 2006 he lived in a Leipzig nursing home.

Delmare was married five times, most recently to Renate Schuck from 1986 until his death. From the first four marriages he had five children (three daughters and two sons). The actor was overtaken by several strokes of fate. His daughter Felicitas took her life 1980 after fleeing to West Germany. 1993 - in the birthday night of his father - his son Nici stabs his girlfriend to death. The oldest son Tino died 2001 with 41 years of hepatic cancer.

The day after his 87th birthday Delmare was taken to a Leipzig hospital. A few days later he died from the consequences of double pneumonia. His urn was buried in Leipzig on 27 May 2009 with many former colleagues on the South Cemetery attending.

His written works are located in the archive of the Academy of Arts in Berlin.

== Awards ==
- 1960: Art Prize of the GDR for the television film Naked Among Wolves
- 1986: Theodor Körner Award (GDR)
- 1987: Patriotic Order of Merit in gold for his complete actor works

== Selected filmography ==
- Naked Among Wolves (1960, TV film)
- Naked Among Wolves (1963)
- Viel Lärm Um Nichts (1964)
- Bread and Roses (1967)
- Ripe Cherry (1973)
- Ulzana (1974)
- Johannes Kepler (1974)
- Matulla und Busch (1995, TV film)
