= A Friend So Lovely as You =

Operetta by Will Meisel

A Friend So Lovely as You (German: Eine Freundin so goldig wie Du) is an operetta by Will Meisel to a libretto by Willy Rosen and Marcel Lion. It premiered at the Central-Theater (Berlin) on 19 September 1930. The same year, it was turned into a film with Anny Ondra, Felix Bressart and Adele Sandrock, directed by Carl Lamac; the title song was performed by Zarah Leander.

== Bibliography ==
- Grange, William (2008). Cultural Chronicle of the Weimar Republic. Langam, Maryland: Scarecrow Press. ISBN 9780810859678.
