= Schwarzwaldmädel (1933 film) =

1933 film directed by Georg Zoch

- Directed by: Georg Zoch
- Written by: August Neidhart; Franz Rauch
- Produced by: Harry Piel
- Starring: Maria Beling; Hans Söhnker; Walter Janssen; Kurt von Ruffin
- Cinematography: Georg Bruckbauer; Ewald Daub
- Edited by: Erich Palme
- Production company: Ariel-Film
- Distributed by: Deutsch Lichtspiel-Syndikat
- Release date: 30 November 1933
- Running time: 90 minutes
- Country: Germany
- Language: German

Schwarzwaldmädel (Black Forest Girl) is a 1933 German operetta film directed by Georg Zoch and starring Maria Beling, Hans Söhnker, and Walter Janssen. The film is based on the 1917 operetta of the same title, composed by Leon Jessel with a libretto by August Neidhart. It was one of several film adaptations of the story. It premiered in Stuttgart on 30 November 1933.

== Cast ==
- Maria Beling as Bärbele
- Hans Söhnker as Hans Fichtner, Student
- Walter Janssen as Domkapellmeister Römer
- Kurt von Ruffin as Richard Keßler, Student
- Lotte Lorring as Malvine von Hainau
- Olga Limburg as Die alte Traudel
- Eugen Rex as Rutschke
- Hans Sternberg as Der Ochsenwirt

== Bibliography ==
- Braun, Rebecca; Marven, Lyn, eds. (2010). Cultural Impact in the German Context: Studies in Transmission, Reception, and Influence. Camden House. ISBN 978-1-57113-430-1.
