= A Blackmailer's Trick =

1921 film

- German: Ein Erpressertrick
- Directed by: Erich Schönfelder
- Written by: Georg Schmidt-Rudow; Erich Schönfelder
- Produced by: Paul Davidson
- Starring: Ferdinand von Alten; Willi Schaeffers; Loni Nest
- Cinematography: Willy Gaebel
- Production company: PAGU
- Distributed by: UFA
- Release date: 6 May 1921
- Country: Germany
- Languages: Silent; German intertitles

A Blackmailer's Trick (German: Ein Erpressertrick) is a 1921 German silent mystery film directed by Erich Schönfelder and starring Ferdinand von Alten, Willi Schaeffers and Loni Nest. It features the popular detective hero Joe Deebs.

== Cast ==
- Ferdinand von Alten as Joe Deebs, detective
- Willi Schaeffers as Bob Osborn
- Loni Nest as Alice Osborn
- Erich Schönfelder as Cowter
- Bruno Kretschmer as policeman
- Georg Schmidt-Rudow as shyster lawyer
- Jaro Fürth
