= Song of the Black Mountains =

- Directed by: K. Breiness; Hans Natge
- Written by: Hans Klaehr; Josef Pelz von Felinau
- Starring: Ita Rina; Blandine Ebinger; Ernst Dumcke
- Cinematography: Herbert Körner; Kurt Neubert
- Music by: Josip Slavenski; Oskar Woll
- Production company: Deutsche Eidophon-Film
- Release date: 19 January 1933
- Running time: 88 minutes
- Countries: Germany; Yugoslavia
- Language: German

Song of the Black Mountains (German: Das Lied der Schwarzen Berge) or Phantom of Durmitor is a 1933 German-Yugoslav film directed by K. Breiness and Hans Natge and starring Ita Rina, Blandine Ebinger and Ernst Dumcke. It was shot at the Terra Studios in Berlin.

== Cast ==
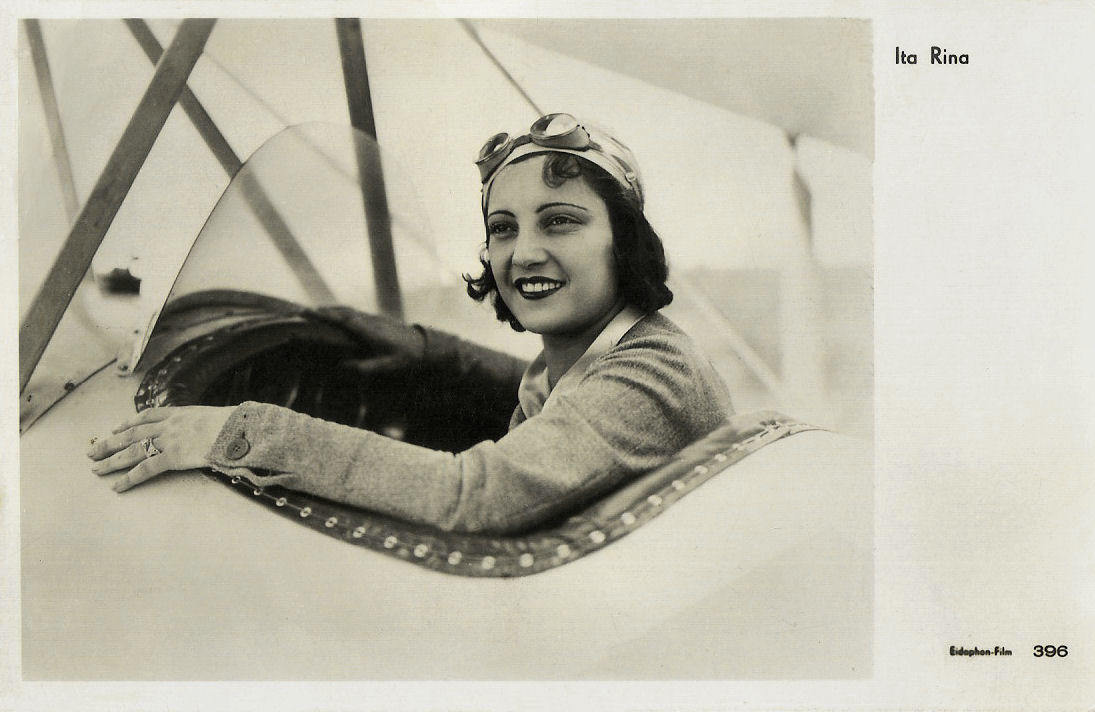
Ita Rina in a promotional photo

- Ita Rina as Jela Gruic
- Blandine Ebinger as Madame Mériaux
- Ernst Dumcke as Schenk
- Albert Kersten as Duschan Gruic
- Hinko Nucic as Der alte Gruic
- Heinz Salfner as M. Mériaux
- Carl de Vogt as Windolf
- Karl Platen
- Otto Kronburger
- Paul Günther
- Arndt von Rautenfeld
- Busch

== Bibliography ==
- Daniel Biltereyst & Daniela Treveri Gennari. Moralizing Cinema: Film, Catholicism, and Power. Routledge, 2014.
- Klaus, Ulrich J. Deutsche Tonfilme: Jahrgang 1933. Klaus-Archiv, 1988.
