= Passion (1940 film) =

1940 film

- Directed by: Walter Janssen
- Written by: Otto Ernst Hesse; Reinhard Köster
- Produced by: Rolf Randolf
- Starring: Olga Chekhova; Hans Stüwe; Paul Otto
- Cinematography: Karl Puth
- Edited by: Lothar Buhle
- Music by: Carl Emil Fuchs
- Production company: Terra Film
- Distributed by: Terra Film
- Release date: 20 February 1940
- Running time: 81 minutes
- Country: Germany
- Language: German

Passion (German: Leidenschaft) is a 1940 German drama film directed by Walter Janssen and starring Olga Chekhova, Hans Stüwe and Paul Otto.

The film's sets were designed by the art director Gabriel Pellon and Heinrich Richter. It was partly shot on location in Tyrol.

== Cast ==
- Olga Chekhova as Gerda
- Hans Stüwe as Hans Strobel
- Paul Otto as Graf Hubert
- Hilde Körber as Leni
- Traudl Stark as Angelika
- Fritz Rasp as Boddin
- Hubert von Meyerinck as Graf Christian
- Otto Gebühr as Dr. Myrbach
- Hans Junkermann as Dr. Hermann
- Ilse Abel
- Lina Carstens
- Will Dugal
- Karl Etlinger
- Hilde Larsen
- Paul Mederow
- Hellmuth Passarge
- Paul Rehkopf
- Georg H. Schnell
- F.W. Schröder-Schrom
- Bruno Ziener

== Bibliography ==
- Bock, Hans-Michael & Bergfelder, Tim. The Concise CineGraph. Encyclopedia of German Cinema. Berghahn Books, 2009.
