= Family Parade =

1936 film directed by Fritz Wendhausen

- Directed by: Fritz Wendhausen
- Written by: Ernst Hasselbach; Per Schwenzen; Felix von Eckardt
- Starring: Ernst Dumcke; Curd Jürgens; Amanda Lindner
- Cinematography: Herbert Körner
- Edited by: Willy Zeunert
- Music by: Fritz Domina; Will Meisel
- Production company: Lloyd-Film
- Distributed by: Tobis Film
- Release date: 14 May 1936
- Running time: 89 minutes
- Country: Germany
- Language: German

Family Parade (German: Familienparade) is a 1936 German comedy film directed by Fritz Wendhausen and starring Ernst Dumcke, Curd Jürgens and Amanda Lindner. It was shot at the Halensee Studios in Berlin. The film's sets were designed by the art director Fritz Maurischat and Karl Weber.

== Cast ==
- Ernst Dumcke as Graf Sven Stjernenhö
- Curd Jürgens as Graf Erik Stjernenhö
- Amanda Lindner as Reichsgräfin Jutta
- Walter Janssen as Graf Hjalmar
- Helmut Weiss as Vetter Bertel
- Hubert von Meyerinck as Vetter Max
- Herbert Hübner as Baron Barrenkrona
- Ellen Frank as Alice Barrenkrona
- Käthe Haack as Karin Bratt
- F.W. Schröder-Schrom as Knut Bratt
- Heinz Rippert as Erik Bratt
- Klaus Pohl as Graf Donnerschlag auf Riesenfels
- Richard Ludwig as Baron Greifenkreuz
- Franz Weber as Graf Löwenborg
- Annemarie Steinsieck as Gräfin Löwenborg
- Hedi Heising as Ingrid
- Ewald Wenck as Graf Güldenstjerna
- Else Ehser as Gräfin Güldenstjerna
- Franz Schönemann as Baron Thornberg
- Maria Seidler as Baronin Thornberg
- Hugo Flink as Herr Wennergren
- Olga Engl as Frau Wennergren
- Maria Krahn as Miss Grove
- Lucie Höflich as Frau Appelquist
- Willi Schaeffers as Johannsen
- Bruno Ziener as Frederik
- Otto Stoeckel as Lindström
- Erich Dunskus as 1. Geschäftsmann
- Oskar Höcker as Geschäftsmann
- Hans Henninger as Lauritz
- Paula Denk as Olga
- Eta Klingenberg as Sigrid

== Bibliography ==
- Klaus, Ulrich J. Deutsche Tonfilme: Jahrgang 1935. Klaus-Archiv, 1988.
- Waldman, Harry (2008). Nazi Films in America, 1933–1942. McFarland. ISBN 978-0-7864-3861-7.
