= Queen of the Night (1951 film) =

1951 film

- Directed by: Kurt Hoffmann
- Written by: Hanns H. Fischer; Ernst Nebhut; Just Scheu
- Produced by: Will Meisel
- Starring: Ilse Werner; Hans Holt; Georg Thomalla
- Cinematography: Bruno Stephan
- Edited by: Johanna Meisel
- Music by: Frank Fox; Will Meisel
- Production company: Will Meisel-Echo-Produktion
- Distributed by: Allianz Filmverleih
- Release date: 29 October 1951
- Running time: 95 minutes
- Country: West Germany
- Language: German

Queen of the Night (German: Königin einer Nacht) is a 1951 West German musical film directed by Kurt Hoffmann and starring Ilse Werner, Hans Holt and Georg Thomalla. It was shot at the Spandau Studios in West Berlin.

== Synopsis ==
The Duke of Novara-Liechtenstein flees his homeland to escape from an arranged marriage with Princess Anna Silvana. She pursues him and tracks him down to the hotel where he is staying.

== Cast ==
- Ilse Werner as Anna Silvana, Prinzessin von Este-Parma
- Hans Holt as Ferdinand, Herzog von Novara-Liechtenstein
- Georg Thomalla as Peter von Hazi
- Jeanette Schultze as Julia
- Ethel Reschke as Marina
- Käthe Haack as Margarete
- Bärbel Spanuth as Barby
- Paul Westermeier as Alexander, Erbherzog von Novara-Liechtenstein
- Paul Heidemann as Hoteldirektor Küküs
- Kurt Pratsch-Kaufmann as Hoteldetektiv Barak
- Jakob Tiedtke as Moritzki
- Erich Fiedler as Ganove
- Walter Gross as Ganove
- Franz-Otto Krüger as Ganove
- Willi Rose as Ganove
- Michael Symo as Ganove
- Vera de Luca as Singer

== Bibliography ==
- Goble, Alan. The Complete Index to Literary Sources in Film. Walter de Gruyter, 1999.
