= Willi Schaeffers =

German actor

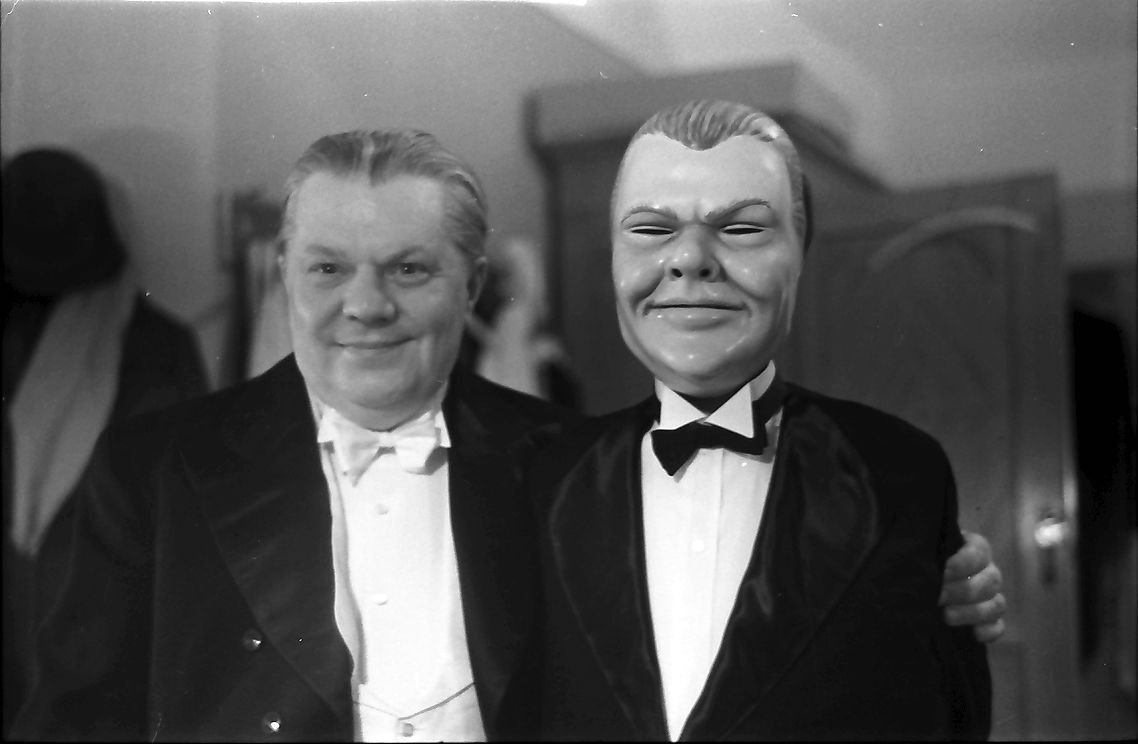
- Schaeffers in 1938
- Born: 2 September 1884; Landsberg an der Warthe, German Empire
- Died: 10 August 1962 (aged 77); Munich, Bavaria, West Germany
- Other name: Wilhelm Schaeffer
- Occupation: Actor
- Years active: 1913–1957 (film)

Willi Schaeffers (1884 – 1962) was a German film actor and cabaret performer.

== Selected filmography ==
- The Blue Mouse (1913)
- A Blackmailer's Trick (1921)
- Nameless Woman (1927)
- The Street Song (1931)
- Kiki (1932)
- Peter Voss, Thief of Millions (1932)
- The Black Whale (1934)
- Princess Turandot (1934)
- Playing with Fire (1934)
- The Daring Swimmer (1934)
- What Am I Without You (1934)
- If It Were Not for Music (1935)
- The Valiant Navigator (1935)
- Every Day Isn't Sunday (1935)
- All Because of the Dog (1935)
- The Castle in Flanders (1936)
- The Merry Wives (1936)
- Family Parade (1936)
- Diamonds (1937)
- Men Without a Fatherland (1937)
- Fools in the Snow (1938)
- Monika (1938)
- The Mystery of Betty Bonn (1938)
- The Deruga Case (1938)
- Red Orchids (1938)
- I'll Never Forget That Night (1949)
- Hit Parade (1953)
- Red Roses, Red Lips, Red Wine (1953)
- The Big Chance (1957)

== Bibliography ==
- Jelavich, Peter. Berlin Cabaret. Harvard University Press, 2009.
