= Music publisher =

Publisher specializing in the distribution of music

A music publisher is a type of publisher that specializes in distributing music. Music publishers originally published sheet music. When copyright became legally protected, music publishers began to play a significant role in the management of composers' intellectual property. Today, music publishers license compositions, collect royalties, and make sure songwriters and composers are paid when their work is used.

Self-publishing can refer to a songwriter or composer who manages their own music copyrights and revenue streams, or one who engraves, distributes, and promotes their own compositions.

== Music print publishing ==
The term "music publisher" originally referred to publishers who issued hand-copied or printed sheet music.

Examples of music publishers actively in business as of June 2019 include:

- Breitkopf & Härtel, Leipzig, Germany, founded 1719
- Schott, Mainz, Germany, 1770
- Oxford University Press, University of Oxford, England, founded in the 18th century
- Edition Peters, Leipzig, 1800
- Casa Ricordi, Milan, Italy, founded 1808 (now owned by Universal Music Publishing Group)
- G. Schirmer, Inc., New York, United States, founded 1861 (now owned by Wise Music Group)
- Universal Edition, Vienna, Austria, 1901
- Bärenreiter, Germany, founded 1923
- Meisel Music, Germany, founded 1926
- Boosey & Hawkes, London, England, founded 1930 (now owned by BMG)
- Hans Sikorski, Hamburg, Germany, 1935 (now an imprint of Boosey & Hawkes)
- PWM, Kraków, Poland, founded 1945
- G. Henle Verlag, Munich, Germany, founded 1948

== Intellectual property management ==
In the music industry, a music publisher or publishing company is responsible for ensuring that songwriters and composers receive payment when their compositions are used commercially. Through an agreement called a publishing contract, a songwriter or composer assigns the copyright of their composition to a publishing company. In return, the company licenses compositions, helps monitor where compositions are used, collects royalties, and distributes them to the composers. They also secure commissions for music and promote existing compositions to recording artists, film, and television.

The copyrights owned and administered by publishing companies are one of the most important forms of intellectual property in the music industry. The other is the copyright on a master recording, which is typically owned by a record company. Publishing companies play a central role in managing this vital asset.

=== The music publisher's role ===
Songwriters and composers typically maintain a contractual relationship with a music publishing company through a publishing agreement. Publishers may provide advances against future income. In return, the publishing company receives a percentage of the songwriter’s or composer’s royalties, which can be as high as 50% and may vary depending on the type of royalty.

There are several types of royalty:

- Mechanical royalties derive from the sale of recorded music, such as CDs or digital downloads. These royalties are paid to publishers by record companies (through the Harry Fox Agency as well as through American Mechanical Rights Agency in the U.S.).
- Performance royalties are collected by performance rights organizations such as SESAC, Broadcast Music, Inc., American Society of Composers, Authors and Publishers or PRS. They are paid by radio stations and others who broadcast recorded music, as well as by venues and event organizers for live performances of their compositions.
- Synchronization royalties are required when a composition is used in a film or television soundtrack. These royalties typically pass through the hands of a music publisher before they reach the composer.

Publishers also work to link new songs by songwriters with suitable recording artists to record them and to place writers' songs in other media, such as movie soundtracks and commercials. They will typically also handle copyright registration and "ownership" matters for the composer. Music print publishers also supervise the issue of songbooks and sheet music by their artists.

=== Publishing disputes ===
Traditionally, music publishing royalties are split seventy/thirty, with thirty percent going to the publisher (as payment for their services) and the rest going to the songwriter or songwriters. Other arrangements have been made in the past, and continue to be; some better for the writers, some better for the publishers. Occasionally, a recording artist will ask for a co-writer's credit on a song (thus sharing in both the artist and publishing royalties) in exchange for selecting it to perform, particularly if the writer is not well known. Sometimes an artist's manager or producer will expect a co-credit or share of the publishing (as with Norman Petty and Phil Spector), and occasionally a publisher will insist on writer's credit (as Morris Levy did with several of his acts); these practices are listed in ascending order of scrupulousness, as regarded by the music industry.

The most unscrupulous type of music publisher is the song shark, who does little if any real "legwork" or promotion on behalf of songwriters. Song sharks make their profit not on royalties from sales, but by charging inexperienced writers for "services" (some real, such as demo recording or musical arranging, some fictional, such as "audition" or "review" fees) a legitimate publisher would provide without cost to the writer, as part of their job. By comparison, a bona fide publisher who charges admission to a workshop for writers, where songs may be auditioned or reviewed, is not wrong to do so.

Rock and roll pioneer Buddy Holly split with longtime manager Petty over publishing matters in late 1958, as did the Buckinghams with producer James William Guercio almost a decade later. John Fogerty of Creedence Clearwater Revival (CCR) was sued by his former publisher Saul Zaentz (who had also served as his manager) over a later Fogerty song that sounded slightly like a CCR song Zaentz published. Fogerty won in court.

Several bands and artists own (or later purchase) their own publishing and start their own companies, with or without help from an outside agent. The sale or loss of publishing ownership can be devastating to a given artist or writer, financially and emotionally. R&B legend Little Richard was largely cheated out of his music publishing and copyrights, as were many performers. Brian Wilson and Mike Love of The Beach Boys were crushed to learn that Murry Wilson (father to three of the Beach Boys, Love's uncle, and the band's music publisher) had sold their company Sea of Tunes to A&M Records during 1969 for a fraction of what it was worth – or earned in the following years.

A large factor in the Beatles' breakup was when their publisher Dick James sold his share of Northern Songs, the company they'd formed with him in 1963 (then taken public in 1967, with shares trading on the London Stock Exchange), to Britain's Associated TeleVision (ATV) in 1969. Neither the Beatles nor managers Lee Eastman and Allen Klein were able to prevent ATV from becoming majority stockholders in Northern Songs, whose assets included virtually all the group's song copyrights. Losing control of the company, John Lennon and Paul McCartney elected to sell their share of Northern Songs (and thus their own copyrights), while retaining their writers' royalties. (George Harrison and Ringo Starr retained minority holdings in the company.)

== See also ==
- Broadcast Music, Inc.
- American Society of Composers, Authors and Publishers
- Transcription (music)
- List of record labels
