= Hüttensteinach =

Former town in Thuringia, Germany

Coordinates: 50°22′N 11°13′E

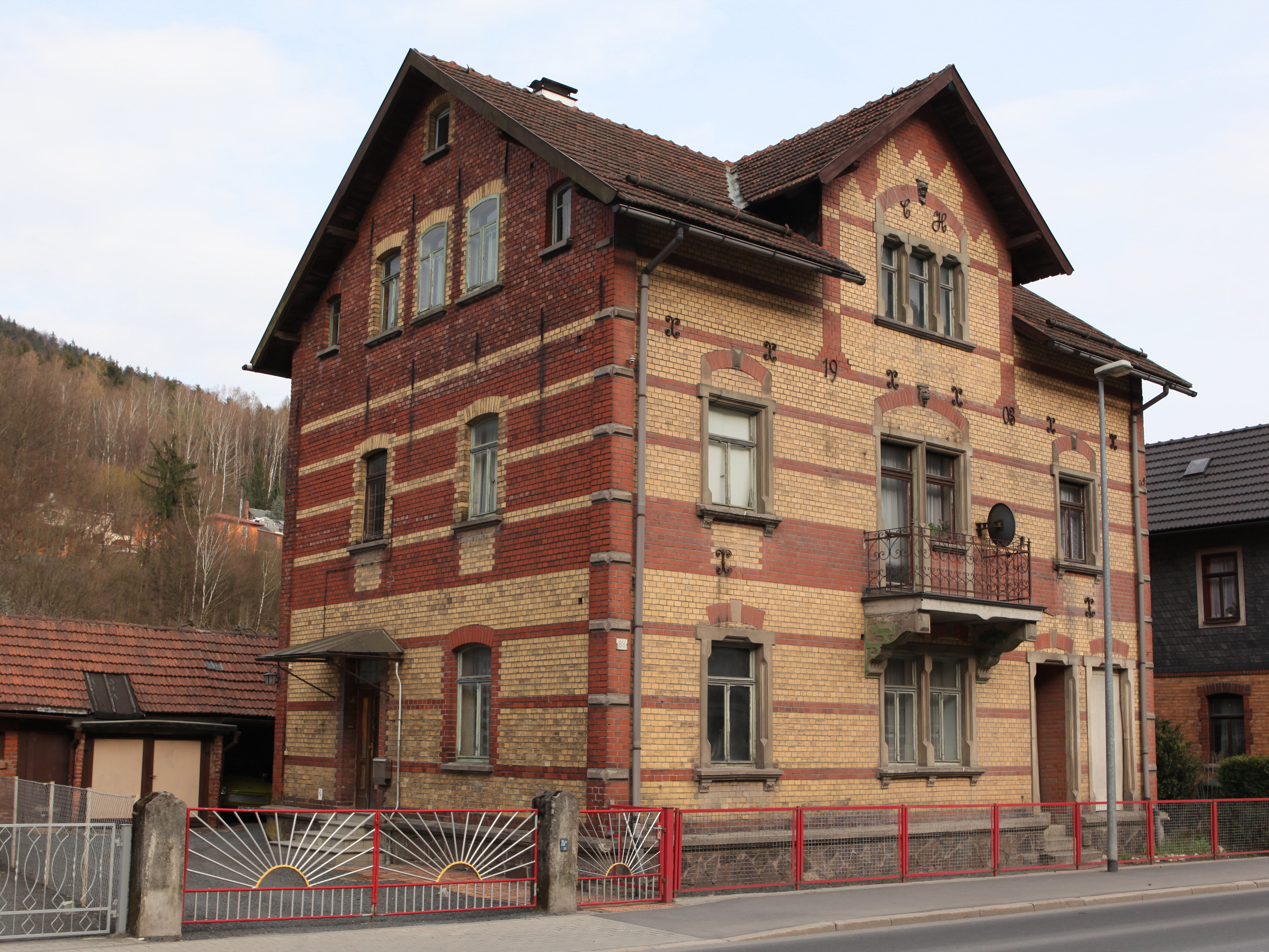
A business building with living quarters, built in 1903

Hüttensteinach is a suburb of Sonneberg, in Thuringia, Germany.

While Hüttensteinach was an independent town until 1923, it has since been absorbed by Köppelsdorf, which was then absorbed in 1950 by the larger town of Sonneberg. Today, Hüttensteinach exists as a suburb of Sonneberg.

The town of Hüttensteinach was first mentioned in documents dated April 13, 1464. The town lay at a side branch of the old army and trade route connecting Nürnberg and Leipzig. The narrow north-south valley limited sun exposure and made agriculture difficult. However, the iron and copper ores mined in the nearby mountains formed the foundation for mining industry since the 15th century. The ore smelteries (German: Schmelzhütten) and hammer mills formed the foundation of Hüttensteinach, which rapidly grew with housing for charburners, smelters, ironworkers, and miners.

German actors Walter Franck (1896–1961) and Fred Delmare (1922–2009) were both from Hüttensteinach.
