= Hilda Rückert =

German ice skater

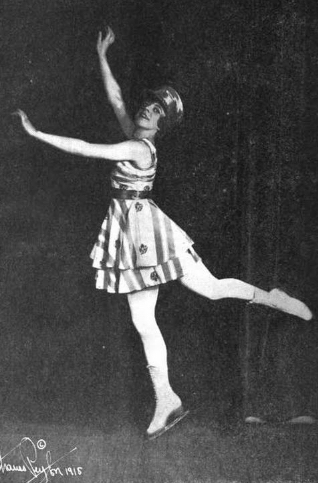
- Hilda Ruckert, from a 1918 publication
- Born: Hildegard Charlotte Elisabeth Rückert; 8 April 1897; Berlin, German Empire
- Died: 14 November 1960 (aged 63); Nuremberg, West Germany
- Other names: Hilda Ruekert, Hilda Ruckhert
- Occupation: Ice skater

Hilda Rückert (8 April 1897 – 14 November 1960) was a German ice skater.

== Early life ==
Hildegard Charlotte Elisabeth Rückert was born in Charlottenburg, Berlin, the daughter of Fritz Karl Rückert and Luise Wilhelmine Karoline Schucht Rückert.

== Career ==
Rückert traveled to New York City in 1915 with a troupe of young women ice skaters, to join a show at the Hippodrome. As a solo performer, she starred in a rooftop show at the Golden Glades restaurant in New York, and made appearances on ice skates and rollerskates in Boston, Ottawa, Austin, Saranac Lake, Saratoga Springs, and other North American cities. She skated and practiced diving at Indianola Park in Columbus, Ohio. In 1923, she competed as a speed skater at Lake Placid. In 1924, she and her sister Ofilia gave skating exhibitions at the National Ice Skating Championships in Endicott, New York.

Rückert returned to Europe by 1928. She skated as a solo attraction at the St. Moritz Ice Rink for several years. She also skated in pairs with Paul Kreckow, and American skater Howard Nicholson. She appeared in a film, Der Springer von Pontresina (1934).

== Personal life ==
Rückert married Svend Zacho Lind, a Danish man, in 1930. She died in Nuremberg in 1960, aged 63 years.
