= Kurt von Ruffin =

German actor and opera singer

Kurt von Ruffin (28 September 1901 – 17 November 1996) was a German actor and opera singer who was imprisoned by the Nazis for the crime of homosexuality.

== Career ==
Von Ruffin began his career as a singer. Starting in 1927, he sang with the operas of Magdeburg, Mainz, and Nuremberg. He made his film debut in 1931 in Die Faschingsfee and Walzerparadies, also starring in Harry Piel's Bobby geht los in the same year. For the latter film, von Ruffin took boxing lessons from heavyweight champion Hans Breitensträter.

After completing filming on The Black Forest Girl in 1933, von Ruffin was identified as a homosexual by another gay man who named him under torture, and imprisoned at Lichtenburg concentration camp, where many gay men were imprisoned, for two years. Von Ruffin says that SS guards touched prisoners and then beat those who got sexually aroused. He also recalls being forced to watch as some prisoners were beaten to death.

After nine months in Lichtenburg, von Ruffin was released thanks to the intervention of prominent theatre director Heinz Hilpert, and his lawyers arranged for the destruction of his Gestapo file.

Von Ruffin went on to star in five more movies: Königswalzer (1935), Die Geige lockt (1935), Black Roses (1935), The Hour of Temptation (1936), and Du bist so schön, Berlinerin (1936) before he was finally prohibited from appearing in any more films. From 1941 until the end of the war, he appeared only on stage.

After the war, von Ruffin appeared in several more films, including Ich mach' Dich glücklich (1949), Der blaue Strohhut (1949), Neues vom Hexer (1965), Gentlemen in White Vests (1970), and his last, Der Unbesiegbare (1985).

== Selected filmography ==
- Bobby Gets Going (1931)
- The Battle of Bademunde (1931)
- The Black Forest Girl (1933)
- Her Highness the Saleswoman (1933)
- The Royal Waltz (1935)
- Black Roses (1935)
- The Hour of Temptation (1936)
- I Entrust My Wife to You (1943)
- The Court Concert (1948)
- The Blue Straw Hat (1949)
- Neues vom Hexer (1965)
- Gentlemen in White Vests (1970)

== See also ==
- Karl Gorath
- Persecution of homosexuals in Nazi Germany and the Holocaust
