= Meisel Music =

Music publisher in Berlin, Germany

- Founded: 1926; 99 years ago
- Country of origin: Germany
- Headquarters location: Berlin
- Official website: www.meiselmusic.de

Meisel Music is a German independent music publishing group based in Berlin.

== History ==
The company was originally founded in 1926 by the award-winning German operetta and film composer Will Meisel as Edition Meisel & Co. GmbH. The company experienced early success with victories in the German song contest in 1931 and 1932. In 1933 the Meisel catalog, composed almost entirely of songs by Jewish composers and lyricists, was decimated in the wake of Adolf Hitler's new dictatorship, with only seven titles remaining. Edition Meisel & Co. published works by artists such as Walter Kollo, Fred Raymond and Gerhard Winkler. Will Meisel continued to grow the business by actively promoting the publisher's titles with dance orchestra musicians at all major venues, and involving the company in pop festivals and the theater community.

During World War II the company's offices were twice destroyed by bombs and rebuilt, with the company eventually establishing new offices at Wittelsbacherstrasse 18 in West Berlin in 1946.

In 1960, Will Meisel's sons Peter and Thomas joined the company and founded Edition Intro Meisel. Will Meisel withdrew from the publishing house in 1962. Under Peter and Thomas' leadership, very successful titles from German pop music were published, including titles by Christian Bruhn, Frank Farian (including all titles by Boney M.), Gunter Gabriel and Drafi Deutscher. The Meisel brothers also focused on producing and recording, and established the Hansa Tonstudio recording studios and Hansa Records.

In 1984, Peter Meisel sold his shares of the company to his brother. In 1985, after a decline in sales both domestically and internationally, Hansa Records was purchased by Bertelsmann Music Group, who merged them with several other labels like Ariola-Eurodisc to form BMG Berlin Musik GmbH/BMG-Ariola. The Meisel Music group later established the Monopol label, through which works by Helga Hahnemann, Max Raabe and the Palastorchester, and the Schöneberg Boys' Choir have been published.

In 1998, Sven Meisel (1966–2016) became the third generation managing director of the Meisel music publishers, a position he held until his death on 6 January 2016. He was succeeded by his wife, Kirsten.

== See also ==
- Hansa Tonstudio
- Hansa Records
