= Girls in White =

1936 film

- Directed by: Victor Janson
- Written by: Harald Bratt; Will Spindler
- Produced by: Hans von Wolzogen
- Starring: Maria Cebotari; Iván Petrovich; Hilde von Stolz
- Cinematography: Willy Hameister
- Music by: Theo Mackeben
- Production company: Fabrikation Deutscher Filme
- Distributed by: Märkische Film; Kiba Kinobetriebsanstalt (Austria)
- Release date: 29 August 1936
- Running time: 85 minutes
- Country: Germany
- Language: German

Girls in White (German: Mädchen in Weiß) is a 1936 German musical comedy film directed by Victor Janson and starring Maria Cebotari, Iván Petrovich and Hilde von Stolz. It was shot at the Terra Studios in Berlin. The film's sets were designed by the art director

== Synopsis ==
Set in pre-revolutionary Russia at the Smolny Institute, the film tells the story of the young student Daniela, who wants to follow in her mother's footsteps and become an opera singer. The film's most famous song is "I am Here to be Happy" ("Ich bin auf der Welt glücklich zu sein").

== Cast ==
- Maria Cebotari as Daniela
- Iván Petrovich as Count Feodor Ivanowitsch Schuwalow
- Hilde von Stolz as Natalia (a dancer)
- Georg Alexander as Grand Duke Sergej Andrejewitsch
- Ernst Dumcke as Opera Director
- Hans Junkermann as General Goremkin (Daniela's uncle)
- Ilse Fürstenberg as Irina (General Goremkin's wife)
- Herta Worell as Vera (schoolgirl)
- Trude Haefelin as Olga (schoolgirl)
- Rosette Zobber as Marina (schoolgirl)
- Eduard Wenck as Marignano (conductor)
- Norberto Ardelli as Cavallini (a famous tenor)
- Margarete Schön as Maria Petrowna
- Blandine Ebinger as Lydia Antonowana (nursery school teacher)
- Änne von Elms as Gilda in the opera Rigoletto

== Criticism ==
Contemporary American critics complimented Cebotari's work in the "operatic film." Variety noted that it was "not exactly a second 'Mädchen in Uniform' for world consumption," but praised Cebotari's performance.

== Bibliography ==
- Klaus, Ulrich J. Deutsche Tonfilme: Jahrgang 1936. Klaus-Archiv, 1988.
