= Vivigenz Eickstedt =

German actor

- Occupation: Actor
- Years active: 1934-1939 (film)

Vivigenz Eickstedt was a German stage and film actor.

== Selected filmography ==
- The Riders of German East Africa (1934)
- The Champion of Pontresina (1934)
- Every Day Isn't Sunday (1935)
- Pygmalion (1935)

== Bibliography ==
- Goble, Alan. The Complete Index to Literary Sources in Film. Walter de Gruyter, 1999.
