= The Blue Straw Hat =

1949 film directed by Viktor Tourjansky

- Directed by: Viktor Tourjansky
- Written by: Emil Burri; Viktor Tourjansky
- Based on: The Blue Straw Hat by Friedrich Michael
- Produced by: Georg Witt
- Starring: Margot Hielscher; Karl Schönböck; Mady Rahl
- Cinematography: Konstantin Irmen-Tschet
- Edited by: Werner Jacobs
- Music by: Paul Lincke; Alois Melichar
- Production company: Georg Witt-Film
- Distributed by: Schorcht Filmverleih; Sascha Film (Austria)
- Release date: 22 December 1949
- Running time: 89 minutes
- Country: West Germany
- Language: German

The Blue Straw Hat (German: Der blaue Strohhut) is a 1949 West German period comedy film directed by Viktor Tourjansky and starring Margot Hielscher, Karl Schönböck and Mady Rahl. It was shot at the Bavaria Studios in Munich and on location in the city's Nymphenburg Palace Park. The film's sets were designed by the art director Max Mellin and Max Seefelder. It is based on the play of the same title by Friedrich Michael.

== Cast ==
- Margot Hielscher as Lola
- Karl Schönböck as Paul
- Gisela Schmidting as Isabella
- Gustav Knuth as Caesar von Waldau
- Mady Rahl as Mathilde
- Hubert von Meyerinck as Ciapollini
- Theodor Danegger as Kellner Franz
- Walter Kottenkamp as Kammersänger
- Trude Hesterberg as Seine Frau
- Joseph Offenbach as Mario
- Nicolas Koline as Kellner im Separée
- Viktor Afritsch as Fotograf Anton
- Inge Koestler as Gaby
- Walter Janssen as Geschäftsführer Kurpark
- Kurt von Ruffin as Geschäftsführer Mühle

== Bibliography ==
- Goble, Alan (1999). The Complete Index to Literary Sources in Film. Walter de Gruyter. ISBN 978-3-11-095194-3.
