= The Island (1934 film) =

1934 film directed by Hans Steinhoff

- Directed by: Hans Steinhoff
- Written by: Harald Bratt (play); Emil Burri
- Produced by: Karl Ritter
- Starring: Brigitte Helm; Willy Fritsch; Hubert von Meyerinck
- Cinematography: Konstantin Irmen-Tschet
- Edited by: Willy Zeyn
- Music by: Werner Bochmann
- Production company: UFA
- Distributed by: UFA
- Release date: 30 August 1934
- Running time: 100 minutes
- Country: Germany
- Language: German

The Island (German: Die Insel) is a 1934 German thriller film directed by Hans Steinhoff and starring Brigitte Helm, Willy Fritsch and Hubert von Meyerinck. It was made at the Babelsberg Studios in Berlin. Location shooting took place on the coast of Dalmatia. The film's sets were designed by the art directors Artur Günther and Benno von Arent. It premiered at the Ufa-Palast am Zoo in Berlin in August 1934. A separate French version, Vers l'abîme, was also released.

== Plot ==
The action centers on an embassy nestled in a posh residential area but isolated from its surroundings much like an island unto itself.

Among the guests at a reception organized by the embassy is a blackmailer who offers military attaché Captain Rist the opportunity to reacquire a set of secret war plans the blackmailer previously stole from him. Since Rist does not know exactly what the plans are, he agrees to meet the blackmailer in the Silvia Bar. It quickly becomes clear to him that the documents on offer are plans he himself once drafted for practice purposes and are completely worthless. Rist also realizes that should these documents get into the hands of the press, they could cause considerable damage and seriously jeopardize the good relations of the countries concerned. In this situation, he believes meeting the blackmailer's demands is the best way forward.

Since Captain Rist does not have the demanded amount of $6,000, he agrees to sign a promissory note for a fictitious gambling debt payable within 24 hours. At this moment, police officers pursuing an unrelated matter make an entrance and arrest the blackmailer, who still manages to slip the filled-in promissory note to the bar owner, Silvia. She grasps the opportunity to pocket a nice sum of money and goes to the embassy the following day to claim the outstanding amount. Rist asks for an extension of the payment deadline, but the bar owner wants the money immediately. Rist realizes that Silvia is under the mistaken belief that she is talking to commercial attaché Raak, whose checkbook is on the desk. Seeing no other way out, Rist takes the checkbook and writes a check for the amount demanded. He forges Raak's signature and gives the check to Silvia, who then leaves the premises.

The cashing of this large check pushes Raak's account into the red and he becomes aware of the fraud. When the ambassador learns that there has been some unspecified financial irregularity, he pressures Raak to honor the check so that the embassy and its staff would not be put in a bad light. Feeling that his honor has been violated, Raak tenders his resignation from the civil service. Raak's reaction prompts the ambassador to examine the situation in greater depth. Realizing that there must be a miscreant in his embassy's ranks, he assembles his entire staff and tells them that he expects the culprit to do the honorable thing.

Captain Rist decides to take the blame and sees only one way out. He takes his own life by driving his car off a coastal road into the sea. Raak's reputation is restored and he can continue to plan a future with the ambassador's daughter.

== Cast ==
- Brigitte Helm as Kari
- Willy Fritsch as Raak, Handelsattaché
- Otto Treßler as Der Botschafter
- Hubert von Meyerinck as Graf Squeelen, erster Botschaftsrat
- Georg H. Schnell as Hollen, zweiter Botschaftsrat
- Heinz von Cleve as Kapitän Rist, Militärattaché
- Günther Lüders as Barrick, Presseattaché
- Erich Walter as Kraver, Beamter der Botschaft
- Walter Franck as Minister
- Herbert Gernot as Sekretär des Ministers
- Franz Weber as Führer der Handelsdelegation
- Ernst Rotmund as Kommissar Ascunto
- Karl Hannemann as Kriminalbeamter
- Françoise Rosay as Silvia
- Andrews Engelmann as Der Namenlose
- Harry Hardt as Autohändler
- Hans Leibelt as Bankdirektor
- Kurt Seifert as Der Korpulente
- Aribert Wäscher as Geldverleiher

== Bibliography ==
- Bock, Hans-Michael; Bergfelder, Tim, eds. (2009). The Concise Cinegraph: Encyclopaedia of German Cinema. New York: Berghahn Books. ISBN 978-1-57181-655-9.
