= Marcel Wittrisch =

German operatic tenor

External audio
- Shellac recordings with Marcel Wittrisch in the Online Archive of the Österreichische Mediathek

Marcel Wittrisch (1 October 1903 – 3 June 1955) was a popular German operatic tenor.

== Life and career ==
Wittrisch was born in Antwerp, Belgium to a German family, and subsequently studied in Munich, Leipzig, and Milan. His career began in Halle, Saxony-Anhalt in 1925 in a production of Hans Heiling by Marschner at the Halle Opera House. He then went to Brunswick and on to Berlin, where he sang opera from 1929 to 1944. Wittrisch also appeared as Eisenstein in Die Fledermaus at the Royal Opera House, London in 1931.

The fact that Wittisch was able to carve out a fine career in the face of competition from such renowned German tenor rivals as Richard Tauber, Helge Roswaenge, Franz Völker, Julius Patzak, and Peter Anders, among others, testifies to his talent.

Wittrisch's singing in its prime period during the 1930s was characterised by a fresh, gleaming tone and easy top notes. As his voice matured, he undertook heavier operatic roles such as Wagner's Lohengrin in 1937 at the Bayreuth Festival and eventually Siegmund and Parsifal after the Second World War. He died in Stuttgart, aged 53.

== Critical appreciation ==
Wittrisch is inevitably compared to his (now) better known contemporary Richard Tauber. According to the English music critic J B Steane: "Though less individual in style [than Tauber], he was certainly comparable in timbre and less restricted in the upper register."

== Recordings ==
Wittrisch made over 400 individual recordings. Preiser Records released a selection of them entitled Lebendige Vergangenheit - Marcel Wittrisch (717281890243) on CD in 1990, followed by Lebendige Vergangenheit - Marcel Wittrisch Vol 2 (717281895910) in 2004.

== Films ==
- 1930 Darling of the Gods
- 1930 Only on the Rhine
- 1930 Gigolo, der schöne arme Tanzleutnant
- 1930 The Song Is Ended, music by Robert Stolz
- 1931 Liebeskommando
- 1932 Once There Was a Waltz, music by Franz Lehár
- 1934 The Voice of Love, music by Eduard Künneke
