= Walter Janssen =

German actor

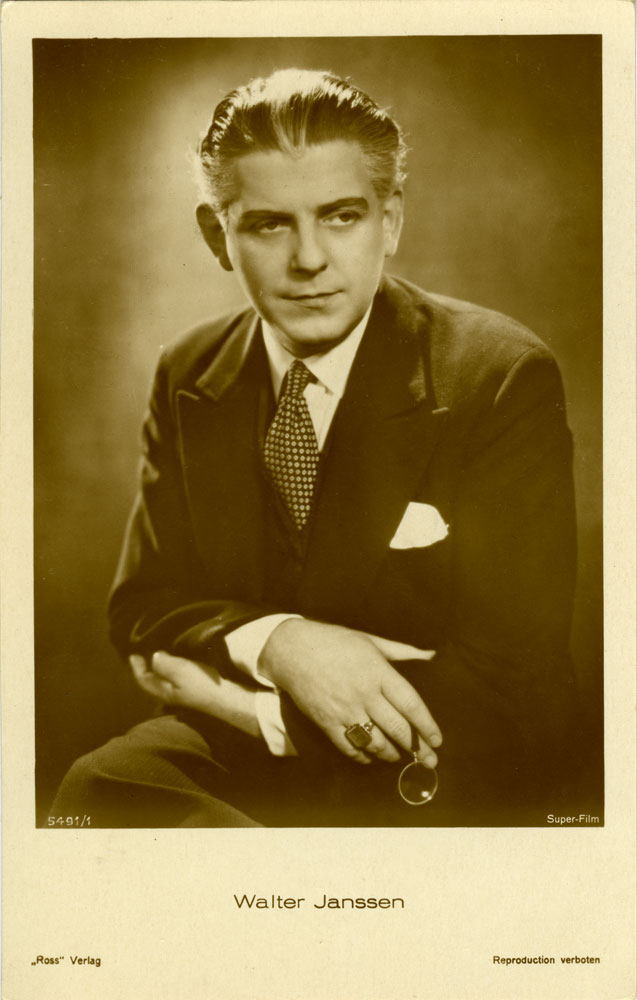
- Janssen c. 1930
- Born: 7 February 1887; Krefeld, German Empire
- Died: 1 January 1976 (aged 88); Munich, West Germany
- Occupation: Actor
- Years active: 1917–1970

Walter Janssen (7 February 1887 – 1 January 1976) was a German film actor and director. He appeared in more than 160 films between 1917 and 1970.

== Selected filmography ==
- The Dancer (1919)
- Destiny (1921)
- Wandering Souls (1921)
- Island of the Dead (1921)
- Peter the Great (1922)
- What Belongs to Darkness (1922)
- Lust for Life (1922)
- Carousel (1923)
- La Boheme (1923)
- The Love of a Queen (1923)
- Shadows of the Metropolis (1925)
- Tragedy (1925)
- The Great Duchess (1926)
- Fräulein Mama (1926)
- Only a Dancing Girl (1926)
- Sword and Shield (1926)
- Women of Passion (1926)
- The House of Lies (1926)
- The Queen of Spades (1927)
- The Little Slave (1928)
- It's You I Have Loved (1929)
- The Night Belongs to Us (1929)
- Black Forest Girl (1929)
- The White Roses of Ravensberg (1929)
- The Flute Concert of Sanssouci (1930)
- The Singing City (1930)
- Two Hearts in Waltz Time (1930)
- The Woman Without Nerves (1930)
- The Great Longing (1930)
- Yorck (1931)
- The Emperor's Sweetheart (1931)
- Everyone Asks for Erika (1931)
- The Concert (1931)
- Queen of the Night (1931)
- The Black Forest Girl (1933)
- Ways to a Good Marriage (1933)
- Laughing Heirs (1933)
- The Hymn of Leuthen (1933)
- Maskerade (1934)
- Roses from the South (1934)
- Master of the World (1934)
- Every Day Isn't Sunday (1935)
- The Old and the Young King (1935)
- Fräulein Veronika (1936)
- The Accusing Song (1936)
- Family Parade (1936)
- Serenade (1937)
- Red Orchids (1938)
- Two Women (1938)
- Mistake of the Heart (1939)
- Passion (1940)
- The Waitress Anna (1941)
- The Comedians (1941)
- Attack on Baku (1942)
- Whom the Gods Love (1942)
- Beloved World (1942)
- Diesel (1942)
- Heaven, We Inherit a Castle (1943)
- The Big Number (1943)
- The War of the Oxen (1943)
- The Wedding Hotel (1944)
- Why Are You Lying, Elisabeth? (1944)
- Young Hearts (1944)
- The Time with You (1948)
- Everything Will Be Better in the Morning (1948)
- Trouble Backstairs (1949)
- The Appeal to Conscience (1949)
- The Blue Straw Hat (1949)
- Chased by the Devil (1950)
- Scandal at the Embassy (1950)
- Who Is This That I Love? (1950)
- Desire (1951)
- The Cloister of Martins (1951)
- The Secret of a Marriage (1951)
- Illusion in a Minor Key (1952)
- Behind Monastery Walls (1952)
- The Mine Foreman (1952)
- Captive Soul (1952)
- I Can't Marry Them All (1952)
- The Colourful Dream (1952)
- Street Serenade (1953)
- Must We Get Divorced? (1953)
- The Chaplain of San Lorenzo (1953)
- Your Heart Is My Homeland (1953)
- The Poacher (1953)
- Everything for Father (1953)
- The Mosquito (1954)
- Hubertus Castle (1954)
- Homesick for Germany (1954)
- Three from Variety (1954)
- The Cornet (1956)
- The Vulture Wally (1956)
- The King of Bernina (1957)
- War of the Maidens (1957)
- Voyage to Italy, Complete with Love (1958)
- Old Heidelberg (1959)
- Every Day Isn't Sunday (1959)
- Something for Everyone (1970)
