= The Champion of Pontresina =

1934 film

- Directed by: Herbert Selpin
- Written by: Hans Richter
- Produced by: Max Iklé; Karl Schulz; Edwin Scotoni; Ralph Scotoni; Max Stöhr; Robert Wüllner
- Starring: Sepp Rist; Rudolf Klicks; Eric Helgar
- Cinematography: Sepp Allgeier; Richard Angst; Heinz von Jaworsky
- Edited by: Lena Neumann
- Music by: Will Meisel
- Production companies: Interna-Tonfilm AG; Schweizer Film-Finanzierungs; Terra Film
- Distributed by: Terra Film
- Release date: 23 May 1934
- Running time: 85 minutes
- Countries: Germany; Switzerland
- Language: German

The Champion of Pontresina (German: Der Springer von Pontresina) is a 1934 German-Swiss comedy film directed by Herbert Selpin and starring Sepp Rist, Rudolf Klicks and Eric Helgar. It is also known by the alternative title of Love in St. Moritz (German: Liebe in St. Moritz).

== Production ==
The film's sets were designed by the art directors Robert A. Dietrich and Bruno Lutz. It was made by Terra Film and shot on location in Switzerland, and at Terra's Marienfelde Studios in Berlin.

== Cast ==
- Sepp Rist as Uli Boeker, Mannschaftsführer
- Vivigenz Eickstedt as Tielko
- Eric Helgar as Moritz
- Rudolf Klicks as Max
- Ludwig Gerner as Karl
- Anni Markart as Violett Moore
- Friedrich Ettel as Friedrich Holz, Industrieller
- Georg H. Schnell as I.P. Moore, Bankier
- Henry Lorenzen as H.W. Macpherson, Sportsmann
- Ali Ghito as Marlen, Mannschaftsführerin
- Edith Anders as Liess
- Katja Bennefeld as Toni
- Hilde Maria Rapp-Fidelius as Maria
- Walter Rilla as Peter Tonani, Geigenvirtuose
- Hans von Petersdorff as Eiskunstläufer
- Hilda Rückert as Eiskunstläuferin
- Hans Albin as Mitglied der Ski-Mannschaft
- Hedi Heising as Ursula Holm
- Erna Fentsch as Bertchen

== Bibliography ==
- Clarke, David B. & Doel, Marcus A. Moving Pictures/Stopping Places: Hotels and Motels on Film. Lexington Books, 2009.
