= Bashful Felix =

1934 film directed by Carl Boese

- Directed by: Carl Boese
- Written by: Hans Holm (novel); Marc Roland
- Produced by: Max G. Hüske
- Starring: Rudolf Platte; Ursula Grabley; Jakob Tiedtke
- Cinematography: Bruno Timm
- Edited by: Hilde Grebner
- Music by: Marc Roland
- Production company: Terra Film
- Distributed by: Terra Film
- Release date: 21 September 1934
- Country: Germany
- Language: German

Bashful Felix or Felix is Right on Target (German: Schützenkönig wird der Felix) is a 1934 German comedy film directed by Carl Boese and starring Rudolf Platte, Ursula Grabley, and Jakob Tiedtke. It was made by Terra Film, with sets designed by art directors Robert A. Dietrich and Bruno Lutz.

== Cast ==
- Rudolf Platte as Felix Kaminski
- Ursula Grabley as Lilli Passerow
- Jakob Tiedtke as Postmeister Passerow
- Paul Heidemann as Julius Zehnschock
- Hans Hermann Schaufuß as Egon Scherzinger
- Leonie Duval as Amalie, seine Frau
- Oskar Sima as Der Bürgermeister
- Grethe Weiser as Seine Frau
- Gaston Briese as Schlächtermeister Strich
- Else Reval as Klärchen, seine Frau
- Friedrich Ettel as Gastwirt Mahlke
- Karl Harbacher as Friseur Jacubeit
- Johanna Ewald as Frau Rendantin
- Gerhard Dammann as Stadtvater und Schützenhauptmann
- Hans Hemes as Meyerhoff, Geschäftsinhaber
- Maria Beling
- Harry Berber
- Karl Falkenberg
- Hermann Frick
- Kurt Getke
- Ida Krill
- Hellmuth Passarge
- Arthur Reppert
- Adi Solta
- Alfred Stratmann
- Hella Thornegg
- Elisabeth von Ruets

== Bibliography ==
- Bock, Hans-Michael; Bergfelder, Tim, eds. (2009). The Concise Cinegraph: Encyclopaedia of German Cinema. New York: Berghahn Books. ISBN 978-1-57181-655-9.
