= The Riders of German East Africa =

1934 film

- Directed by: Herbert Selpin
- Written by: Wilhelm Stöppler
- Based on: Kwa Heri by Marie Luise Droop
- Produced by: Walter Zeiske
- Starring: Sepp Rist; Ilse Stobrawa; Rudolf Klicks
- Cinematography: Emil Schünemann
- Edited by: Lena Neumann
- Music by: Herbert Windt
- Production company: Terra Film
- Distributed by: Terra Film
- Release date: 19 October 1934
- Running time: 89 minutes
- Country: Germany
- Language: German

The Riders of German East Africa (German: Die Reiter von Deutsch-Ostafrika) is a 1934 German war film directed by Herbert Selpin and starring Sepp Rist, Ilse Stobrawa and Rudolf Klicks. It was shot at the Terra Studios in Berlin and on location at the sand dunes at Marienhöhe in the capital, a former quarry which stood in for Africa. The film's sets were designed by the art directors Robert A. Dietrich and Bruno Lutz. It was based on the novel Kwa Heri by Marie Luise Droop. Although produced as an anti-British propaganda film, it was later banned by the Nazi authorities after the outbreak of the Second World War for not being hostile enough to Britain. In the post-war era the film was also banned by the Allies for its promotion of militarism.

== Plot summary ==
Sepp Rist plays the role of Hellhoff, a German farmer in German East Africa, who is conscripted into the Schutztruppe (German armed colonial force) at the beginning of the First World War. His wife Gerda and the young volunteer Klix manage the plantation while he is away. In 1916, the plantation is occupied by a British unit. The commander, Major Cresswell, knows Gerda is secretly supplying Hellhoff and his comrades who are concealed in the bush. He tries to use his old friendship with the Hellhoffs put a stop to her activities. In order to carry out his duty as a British officer, he has his troops occupy the area's water supply to force the German soldiers to surrender. As Hellhoff's wife and Klix are trying to clandestinely supply water to Hellhoff, she is arrested and the boy shot. He still manages to bring the canteens to the soldiers before he dies. Hellhoff and his men liberate Gerda, who was to be taken away for trial by a British military court, and make off with water and horses. On their way to join up with Paul von Lettow-Vorbeck's East African Schutztruppe command, they stop at Klix's grave. Hellhoff promises the dead boy he will come back sooner or later — an allusion to the recovery of the lost colony through German victory in the Second World War.

== Cast ==
- Sepp Rist as German farmer Peter Hellhoff, Captain of the reserve
- Ilse Stobrawa as Gerda Helhoff, his wife
- Rudolf Klicks as Hellhoff's student apprentice Wilm Klix
- Ludwig Gerner as Hellhoff's assistant Lossow
- Lewis Brody as Hellhoff's foreman Hamissi
- Gregor Kotto as Hellhof's boy Selemani
- Peter Voß as English farmer Robert Cresswell
- Georg H. Schnell as Colonel Black, English general staff officer
- Vivigenz Eickstedt as English officer
- Mohamed Husen as signal student Mustapha
- Arthur Reinhardt as safari guide Charles Rallis
- Emine Zehra Zinser as servant Milini

== Release ==
The film was approved by the censors on 17 October 1934, and premiered on 19 October.

== Works cited ==
- Welch, David (1983). Propaganda and the German Cinema: 1933-1945. I.B. Tauris. ISBN 9781860645204.

== Bibliography ==
- Gheorghiu-Cernat, Manuela. Arms and the Film: War-and-peace in European Films. Meridiane, 1983.
- Hull, David Stewart. Film in the Third Reich: A Study of the German Cinema, 1933-1945. University of California Press, 1969.
- Richards, Jeffrey. Visions of Yesterday. Routledge, 1973.
