= Neues vom Hexer =

1965 film

- Film poster
- Directed by: Alfred Vohrer
- Written by: Herbert Reinecker; based on the novel by Edgar Wallace
- Produced by: Horst Wendlandt
- Starring: Heinz Drache
- Cinematography: Karl Löb
- Edited by: Jutta Hering
- Music by: Peter Thomas
- Production company: Rialto Film
- Distributed by: Constantin Film
- Release date: 4 June 1965
- Running time: 95 minutes
- Country: West Germany
- Language: German

Neues vom Hexer (lit. "News from the Sorcerer"), aka Again the Ringer, is a 1965 West German black-and-white crime film directed by Alfred Vohrer and starring Heinz Drache. It is part of a series of German screen adaptations of Edgar Wallace's thriller novels, and the direct sequel of the 1964 film Der Hexer. It was also known as The Ringer Returns.

== Plot ==
The wealthy Lord Curtain is murdered by his nephew Archie Moore with the help of his butler Edwards. At the crime scene, Inspector Wesby (recruited by Sir John to replace Inspector Higgins) finds a calling card left by someone signing the Sorcerer. However the person in question (Arthur Milton) is in Australia at that moment and therefor feels compelled to travel to London with his wife Cora-Ann and his butler Finch to solve the case and clear himself of suspicion of murder, as a trial has been scheduled with him as the defendant in absentia. The Sorcerer shows his abilities when he takes on the role of an observing judge and plays a tape recorder from a hiding place at the crime scene, which the perpetrators intended to use to lay a false trail.

Another murder takes place at the Curtain house, and Lady Curtain is the victim. Hexer disguises himself as the family doctor and gives suspicious answers. Shortly afterwards, the real doctor shows up and says he has no knowledge of what happened. Archie Moore is found dead in a car. Inspector Wesby suggests that Sir John co-operate with the Sorcerer. Sir John suggests that Cora-Ann Milton stop pursuing her husband for the duration of his co-operation in the case.

The dead man's next of kin, Margie Fielding and the child Charles, are about to be assassinated. At the last moment, their lives are saved by Inspector Wesby, who shoots Edwards.The Sorcerer is also able to prevent the death of his secretary Finch.

Charles is kidnapped despite police surveillance. Lady Aston, Lady Curtain's sister, confesses that she recognised the voice of Edwards was in radio contact with her during the assassination attempt as that of Philip Curtain, Lord Curtain's brother, who was believed to be dead. When Philip Curtain tries one more time to kill Margie Fielding after deceiving her with a mask of the Sorcerer, Archibald Finch is on the scene and shoots the mastermind of the crimes. Shortly afterwards, it turns out that Archibald Finch was the masked Arthur Milton. Milton and Finch manage to escape through the food lift. On the way to the airport, however, they and Cora-Ann Milton are tricked and detained by Wesby.

== Cast ==
- Heinz Drache as Inspector James W. Wesby
- Barbara Rütting as Margie Fielding
- Brigitte Horney as Lady Aston
- Margot Trooger as Cora Ann Milton
- Siegfried Schürenberg as Sir John
- Klaus Kinski as Edwards
- Robert Hoffmann as Archie Moore
- Karl John as Dr. Mills (as Carl John)
- Hubert von Meyerinck as Judge Matthews
- Heinz Spitzner as Bailey
- Kurt Waitzmann as Lanny
- Lia Eibenschütz as Lady Curtain
- Teddy Naumann as Charles
- Gisela Hahn as Susan Copperfield
- Lu Saeuberlich as governess (as Lu Säuberlich)
- Eddi Arent as Archibald Finch
- René Deltgen as Arthur Milton

== Production ==
This film is based on the thriller Again the Ringer (The Ringer Returns) by Edgar Wallace. Cinematography took place from 15 March to 27 April 1965 at Berlin/West, London and its environments.

== Release ==
The FSK gave the film a rating of 16 and up and found it not appropriate for screenings on public holidays.
