= Hangmen, Women and Soldiers =

- Directed by: Johannes Meyer
- Written by: Max W. Kimmich; Jacob Geis (dialogues)
- Produced by: Bavaria Film company, Munich
- Starring: Hans Albers; Charlotte Susa; Jack Trevor; Ernst Dumcke
- Music by: Peter Kreuder
- Production companies: Bavaria Studios, Geiselgasteig near Munich
- Distributed by: Bavarian Film company, Munich
- Release date: 19 December 1935
- Country: Germany
- Language: German

Hangmen, Women and Soldiers (German: Henker, Frauen und Soldaten) is a propaganda film made by the German filmmaker Johannes Meyer in 1935. It was produced with the Bavaria film company in Munich. The screenplay was written by Max W. Kimmich and Jacob Geis after the novel A Fellow Named Prack written by Friedrich Reck-Malleczewen.

== Summary ==
Cavalry captain Michael von Prack, a daredevil pilot in World War I, is taken prisoner by British troops in Asia Minor in 1918. He seizes the chance to escape to his homeland East Prussia with a ready-for-take-off British plane. At home, he gets caught up in the post-war turmoil.

In a bar, Michael comes across a captain who is recruiting former regular soldiers to fight in a Freikorps aligned with the White movement against the Red Army. Michael joins the troops and, at the same time, meets lovely Vera Iwanowna. She considers him to be his cousin, Russian general Alexej Alexandrowitsch von Prack, with whom she is in love, because the two men are as like as two peas. Alexej, who cannot stand his cousin Michael since their childhood, commands the Russian troops standing against the Freikorps.

While moving forward into the warzone, Michael re-meets Vera who is not only Alexej's lover, but also a Russian spy. Meanwhile, she has learned that he is Alexej's German cousin, but nevertheless spends a night with him before returning to the Russian headquarters.

When Alexej learns that Vera has met his hated cousin who is the commander of the enemy troops, he swears him death and sets a trap for the Freikorps by luring them into a swamp. In this situation he demands Michael to meet him personally, and the two men fight against each other. Alexej dies, Michael is severely wounded.

Because the latter is not wearing his uniform jacket, the Russians consider him to be the general and take him to their headquarters. Although Vera recognizes him immediately, Michael is able to act as the general and to discover important military secrets. He also gives the Russians orders that improve the situation of the Freikorps.

Meanwhile, Vera is wavering between love and patriotism. Finally she reveals everything to the Russian commissar because her patriotism is stronger than her love to Michael. The latter is, however, able to escape and to return to his soldiers before being arrested.

Now that they know the deployment plans of the Russians, the Freikorps attacks them from the back. Michael is killed in battle, Vera dies when the Freikorps shells the Russian headquarters.

== Background ==
This film was made to defend the deployment of Freikorps in armed conflicts. It passed censorship on 11 December 1935 and was first shown to the public a week later. The movie was rated "artificially valuable" by film censors of the propaganda ministry. (This attribute was given to films that fulfilled special aesthetic criteria besides the actors' performances. It meant that cinemas had to pay a lower rate of entertainment tax when showing this film.)

Moreover, Goebbels himself was also taken by it (which did not always mean the same as pleasing the critics). On 11 December 1935 he wrote in his diary, "an exciting and adorable film with (Hans) Albers."

After the war, it was banned by the Allies.

== Cast ==
| actor | role |
|---|---|
| Hans Albers | Cavalry captain Michael von Prack |
| (dual role) | General Alexej Alexandrowitsch von Prack |
| Charlotte Susa | Vera Iwanowna |
| Jack Trevor | Captain MacCallum |
| Ernst Dumcke | captain Eckau |
| Aribert Wäscher | general manager Brosuleit |
| Hubert von Meyerinck | cavalry captain Lensberg |
| Annie Markart | Marianne, called Mary |
| Otto Wernicke | Pieter Timm |
| Gustav Püttjer | Tetje Eckers |
| Fritz Genschow | Buschke |
| Gerhard Bienert | Kossmann |
