= Hans von Wolzogen (producer) =

German film producer and director

- Born: 5 July 1888; Berlin, German Empire
- Died: 20 May 1954 (aged 65); West Berlin, West Germany
- Occupations: Producer, Director, Screenwriter
- Years active: 1921-1953 (film)

Hans von Wolzogen (1888–1954) was a German film producer and director. He also worked as a production manager on a number of films, his last being Elephant Fury (1953).

== Selected filmography ==
=== Producer ===
- One Minute to Twelve (1925)
- The Lady with the Mask (1928)
- Under False Flag (1932)
- An Enemy of the People (1937)
- The Beaver Coat (1937)
- The Night of Decision (1938)
- Her Private Secretary (1940)
- Thank You, I'm Fine (1948)
- A Rare Lover (1950)

=== Production manager ===
- Light Cavalry (1935)
- Girls in White (1936)
- Daphne and the Diplomat (1937)
- Dangerous Crossing (1937)
- Elephant Fury (1953)

=== Director ===
- You Are Adorable, Rosmarie (1934)

== Bibliography ==
- Giesen, Rolf. Nazi Propaganda Films: A History and Filmography. McFarland, 2003.
- Kester, Bernadette. Film Front Weimar: Representations of the First World War in German films of the Weimar Period (1919-1933). Amsterdam University Press, 2003.
