= Oskar Joost =

German musician

Background information
- Born: 9 June 1898; Wissembourg, Alsace
- Died: 29 May 1941 (aged 42); Berlin
- Instrument(s): violin, tenor saxophone and clarinet

Oskar Joost (9 June 1898 – 29 May 1941) was a German musician, who played violin, tenor saxophone and clarinet, as well as directing a dance orchestra.

== Biography ==
Joost was born into a musical family in Wissembourg, Alsace on 9 June 1898. His father, Albert Joost, was a cellist in the military. Oskar attended high school in Leipzig and participated in the First World War as a volunteer.

In 1924, Oskar and his brother Ali formed the Oscar Joost Dance Orchestra, with Oskar spelling his name with a 'c' instead of a 'k'. Oscar played first violin, and his brother percussion. From 1930, the Orchestra began playing in the Berlin Eden hotel, which led to a recording contract with Electrola, followed by subsequent contracts with other record labels: Pallas (1931), Crystal (1931–1934), Ultraphon/Telefunken (1932), Grammophon/Polydor (1934–1941). In this time, he was also involved in film work.

In 1933, Oskar Joost joined the Nazi Party, again spelling his name with a 'k'. When Oskar was enlisted in January 1940, his orchestra continued under Rudi Juckeland. Oskar rose to the rank of lieutenant, continuing his musical activities by composing a piece of music for his army unit, a 'Bohemian Polka'. In 1940, he was severely wounded during the Battle of France. He died in a hospital in Berlin from flu on 29 May 1941.

== Discography ==
- 1929: Grüß' mir mein Heimatland (Say Hello to my Country)
- 1930: Herr Ober - zwei Mokka (Waiter - Two Mochas)
- 1933: Fensterpromenade (Window Promenade)
- 1937: Hofkonzert im Hinterhaus
