= Eliza Illiard =

German actress

- Born: 25 March 1905; Cologne, German Empire
- Died: 8 July 1969 (aged 64); West Berlin, West Germany
- Occupations: Actress, singer
- Years active: 1934–1941 (film)

Eliza Illiard (1905–1969) was a German singer and actress.

== Selected filmography ==
- What Am I Without You (1934)
- Paganini (1934)
- Scandal at the Fledermaus (1936)
- Love's Awakening (1936)

== Bibliography ==
- Noack, Frank. Veit Harlan: "des Teufels Regisseur". Belleville, 2000.
