= The World Without a Mask =

- Directed by: Harry Piel
- Screenplay by: Harry Piel
- Produced by: Harry Piel
- Starring: Harry Piel; Kurt Vespermann; Annie Markart
- Cinematography: Ewald Daub
- Edited by: Erich Palme
- Music by: Fritz Wenneis
- Production company: Ariel-Film GmbH
- Release date: 9 March 1934 (Berlin)
- Running time: 111 minutes
- Country: Germany

The World Without a Mask (German: Die Welt ohne Maske) is a 1934 German science fiction film directed by and starring Harry Piel. It also features Olga Chekhova and Rudolf Klein-Rogge.

== Cast ==
- Harry Piel as Harry Palmer
- Kurt Vespermann as Dr. Tobias Bern
- Anni Markart as Erika Hansen
- Olga Chekhova as Betty Bandelow
- Rudolf Klein-Rogge as Merker
- Hubert von Meyerinck as E.W. Costa
- Philipp Manning as Dr. Niemann
- Hermann Picha
- Gerhard Dammann
- Ernst Behmer
- Charly Berger
- Karl Platen
- Paul Rehkopf
- Wolfgang von Schwindt

== Release ==
The World Without a Mask premiered in Berlin at the Capitol Theatre on 9 March 1934.

== Sources ==
=== Sources ===
- Hales, Barbara; Petrescu, Mihaela; Weinstein, Valerie (2016). Continuity and Crisis in German Cinema, 1928-1936. Boydell & Brewer.
