= Sepp Rist =

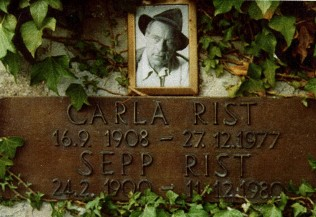
- Born: 24 February 1900; Hindelang, Bavaria, German Empire
- Died: 11 December 1980 (aged 80); Röthenbach, Bavaria, West Germany
- Occupation: Actor
- Years active: 1930-1974 (film)

Sepp Rist (24 February 1900 – 11 December 1980) was a German film actor. In WW1 he served in the Imperial German Navy. He was married to the actress Carla Rust.

== Partial filmography ==
- Storm over Mont Blanc (1930) - Hannes
- S.O.S. Eisberg (1933) - Dr. Johannes Krafft / Dr. Johannes Brand
- The Champion of Pontresina (1934) - Uli Boeker - Mannschaftsführer
- The Riders of German East Africa (1934) - Deutscher Farmer Peter Hellhoff / Hauptmann der Reserve
- The Eternal Dream (1934) - Jacques Balmat
- Rêve éternel (1935) - Jacques Balmat
- The Traitor (1936) - Commissioner Kilian
- Der lachende Dritte (1936) - Sepp
- Kokumin no chikai (1938, i.e. The Oath of the People, German-Japanese co-production by Hiromasa Nomura; released in Nazi Germany as "Das heilige Ziel" in February 1942)
- Der rettende Engel (1940)
- Krambambuli (1940) - Barthel Raunegger, Jäger
- The Vulture Wally (1940) - Joseph Brandl, der "Bärenjoseph"
- Die Erbin vom Rosenhof (1942) - Sepp Vöstl
- The Rainer Case (1942) - Hauptmann Leopold Lechner
- Kohlhiesel's Daughters (1943) - Kaspar Pointer
- Titanic (1943) - Jan
- Der Erbförster (1945)
- Border Post 58 (1951) - Sepp
- The Fall of Valentin (1951) - Christian
- The Devil Makes Three (1952) - Customs Official - German
- The Crucifix Carver of Ammergau (1952) - Jäger
- The Village Under the Sky (1953) - Vincenz, Dorfwirt
- The Poacher (1953) - Oberjäger Kurzinger
- Love and Trumpets (1954)
- Der erste Kuß (1954)
- The Beautiful Miller (1954) - Kriminalinspektor
- Schützenliesel (1954)
- Operation Edelweiss (1954) - Magnus Rasmussen
- Doctor Solm (1955) - Bauer Dinkelsbacher
- The Blacksmith of St. Bartholomae (1955) - Gend.-Inspektor
- As Long as You Live (1955) - Pepe
- Where the Ancient Forests Rustle (1956)
- Die schöne Meisterin (1956)
- Die Magd von Heiligenblut (1956) - Pfarrer von Heiligenblut
- Der Adler vom Velsatal (1957) - Forester Strobl
- Wer die Heimat liebt (1957) - Anton Graspointner, Bauer
- War of the Maidens (1957) - Feldhofer, Großbauer
- The King of Bernina (1957) - Vater Gruber
- Jägerblut (1957)
- Nackt, wie Gott sie schuf (1958)
- Heiße Ware (1959) - Gruber - Grenz-Kommissar
- Mein Vaterhaus steht in den Bergen (1960) - Rudolf Liebmann
- Three Men in a Boat (1961) - Guggemos
- Waldrausch (1962) - Der Mann von Kaprun
- Die schwedische Jungfrau (1965) - Oberwachtmeister (uncredited)
- Da lacht Tirol (1967) - Much
- When Ludwig Goes on Manoeuvres (1967) - Colonel von der Tann
- Hubertus Castle (1973) - Der alte Mühltaler
- The Hunter of Fall (1974) - Der alte Huisen (final film role)

== Bibliography ==
- Goble, Alan. The Complete Index to Literary Sources in Film. Walter de Gruyter, 1999.
