= What Am I Without You =

1934 film directed by Arthur Maria Rabenalt

- German film poster
- German: Was bin ich ohne Dich
- Directed by: Arthur Maria Rabenalt
- Written by: Carl Echtermeier; Thea von Harbou
- Produced by: Frank Clifford; Oskar Han
- Starring: Wolfgang Liebeneiner; Betty Bird; Olga Chekhova
- Cinematography: Herbert Körner
- Edited by: Willy Zeunert
- Music by: Will Meisel
- Production company: Lloyd-Film
- Distributed by: Neue Deutsch Lichtspiel-Syndikat Verleih
- Release date: 24 August 1934
- Running time: 80 minutes
- Country: Germany
- Language: German

What Am I Without You (German: Was bin ich ohne Dich) is a 1934 German musical comedy film directed by Arthur Maria Rabenalt and starring Wolfgang Liebeneiner, Betty Bird, and Olga Chekhova.

The film's sets were designed by the art directors Gustav A. Knauer, Alexander Mügge and Walter Reimann. It was shot at the Johannisthal Studios in Berlin.

== Cast ==
- Wolfgang Liebeneiner as Erwin Schwarz, Komponist
- Betty Bird as Paula Schwarz, genannt Polly, seine Frau
- Olga Chekhova as Lilly Petrowa, Schauspielerin
- Paul Westermeier as Ulrich, Direktor der Fortuna-Film A.G.
- Blandine Ebinger as Fräulein Mengler
- Rudolf Platte as Franz Hurtig, Schriftsteller
- Harry Frank as Juan Herdina
- Fita Benkhoff as Frau Winkler
- Willi Schaeffers as Schwanke, Gerichtsvollzieher
- Viktor de Kowa as himself
- Werner Fuetterer as himself
- Werner Finck as himself
- Paul Richter as himself
- Will Meisel as Singer-Bandleader
- Eliza Illiard as herself / Singer
- Hilde Weissner as herself
- Erna Morena as herself
- Lissy Arna as herself
- Maria Loja as herself
- Anna Müller-Lincke as herself
- Tina Schneider as herself
- Betty Sedlmayr as herself
- Ernst Behmer as himself
- Günther Ballier as himself
- Otto Sauter-Sarto as himself
- Wolfgang von Schwind as himself
- S. O. Schoening as himself
