= Herta Worell =

German actress

- Born: 20 September 1908; Olomouc, Moravia, Austria-Hungary
- Died: 5 April 1996 (aged 87); Munich, Germany
- Occupation: Actress
- Years active: 1934–1995

Herta Worell (20 September 1908 – 5 April 1996) was a German actress. She appeared in more than 75 films and television shows between 1934 and 1995.

== Selected filmography ==
- You Are Adorable, Rosmarie (1934)
- If It Were Not for Music (1935)
- Girls in White (1936)
- The Coral Princess (1937)
- Tango Notturno (1937)
- Red Orchids (1938)
- Bravo Acrobat! (1943)
- Crown Jewels (1950)
- Thirteen Under One Hat (1950)
- One Night's Intoxication (1951)
- Under the Stars of Capri (1953)
- The Cousin from Nowhere (1953)
- Between Time and Eternity (1956)
- The Last Chapter (1961)
- Die Schlüssel (1965, TV miniseries)
- All People Will Be Brothers (1973)
- Three Swedes in Upper Bavaria (1977)
- Dracula Blows His Cool (1979)
