= Annie Markart =

German actress

- Born: 5 August 1907; Frankfurt am Main German Empire
- Died: 23 January 1991 (aged 83); Munich, Germany
- Occupations: Actress, singer, dancer
- Years active: 1930 – 1955 (film)

Annie Markart (sometimes credited as Anni Markart; 5 August 1907 – 23 January 1991) was a German film actress, singer and dancer. She appeared in twenty four films during her career, mostly during the Weimar and Nazi eras.

== Selected filmography ==
- The Deed of Andreas Harmer (1930)
- Inquest (1931)
- Bobby Gets Going (1931)
- The Unknown Guest (1931)
- The Unfaithful Eckehart (1931)
- His Majesty's Adjutant (1932)
- Overnight Sensation (1932)
- Girls of Today (1933)
- The World Without a Mask (1934)
- The Flower Girl from the Grand Hotel (1934)
- The Champion of Pontresina (1934)
- An Ideal Husband (1935)
- Knockout (1935)
- Every Day Isn't Sunday (1935)
- The White Horse Inn (1935)
- Silhouettes (1936)
- Three Wonderful Days (1939)
- Gold in New Frisco (1939)
