= Rudolf Klicks =

German actor

- Born: 21 May 1917; Berlin, German Empire
- Died: 5 September 1997 (aged 80); Germany
- Occupation: Actor
- Years active: 1932-1941 (film)

Rudolf Klicks (21 May 1917 – 5 September 1997) was a German film actor.

== Selected filmography ==
- Tannenberg (1932)
- Girls of Today (1933)
- The Riders of German East Africa (1934)
- The Champion of Pontresina (1934)
- Gypsy Blood (1934)
- The Dreamer (1936)
- The Castle in Flanders (1936)
- Seven Slaps (1937)
- My Son the Minister (1937)
- The Four Companions (1938)
- Six Days of Leave (1941)

== Bibliography ==
- Bernadette Kester. Film Front Weimar: Representations of the First World War in German Films of the Weimar Period. Amsterdam University Press, 2003.
