= Master of the World (1934 film) =

- Directed by: Harry Piel
- Written by: Georg Mühlen-Schulte
- Produced by: Harry Piel
- Starring: Walter Janssen; Sybille Schmitz; Aribert Waescher; Willi Schur
- Cinematography: Ewald Daub
- Edited by: Erich Palme
- Music by: Fritz Wenneis
- Release date: 1934
- Running time: 90 minutes
- Country: Germany
- Language: German

The Master of the World (German: Der Herr der Welt) is a German science fiction film first released in 1934. Directed by Harry Piel, the story features a villain who is trying to conquer the world using "Überrobots". The film was released in the U.S. in 1935.

Its themes are the ethical replacement of human labor by robots, and the threat to humanity by robots used as war machines.

== Synopsis ==
Machine manufacturer Dr Erich Heller is a humanist visionary who hopes that the mechanisation of the world of work will lead to an all-round improvement in living conditions for the working man. He wants his ‘machine men’, his robots, to be used particularly in the mines, where miners often carry out highly dangerous and physically demanding work. Heller mistakenly considers his most capable scientist, Professor Wolf, the most important supporter of his vision of a ‘better working world’. Unbeknownst to him, Wolf has long been pursuing his own agenda. He wants to achieve world domination by creating a ‘super robot’, a deadly, invincible ‘fighting machine’.

On a business trip, Heller inspires fellow traveller Werner Baumann, a mining engineer, with his vision of man and machine merging into a single entity to the benefit of mankind. Baumann has barely returned to his colliery when a devastating firedamp explosion kills numerous miners. Meanwhile, Dr Heller returns to his plant to see a presentation of Professor Wolf's latest breakthrough. Wolf proudly demonstrates his new super robot to his employer. When Heller, who is appalled by Wolf's unauthorized and bizarre research activities, gets too close to the killer robot, he is hit by its deadly rays. Wolf declares his death a ‘tragic industrial accident’.

Wolf tries to persuade Heller's widow Vilma to give him a completely free hand in his experiments. Meanwhile, the young woman gets to know Baumann during a holiday and he visits her occasionally. Baumann is very worried about Heller's products. His employer has converted his colliery to machine operation and many miners have become unemployed due to the use of robots. Baumann wants to dissuade Vilma from her plan to transfer her late husband's company to Wolf. Realising that Wolf's machines are exploiting people and that his super robot is supposed to quell any riots, Baumann confronts Wolf and his robot in the laboratory. Baumann is hit by the dangerous rays and falls to the ground. He is saved by Vilma, who has fallen in love with him, while Wolf falls victim to his own monster machine. The super robot destroys the laboratory of doom and everything around it and finally itself.

Vilma and Baumann decide to rebuild the Heller factory in the spirit of Erich Heller. Their robotic machines are to be used exclusively for the benefit of working people and a part of the profits from their sale will be used to benefit redundant workers.

== Cast ==
- Walter Janssen as Dr. Heller
- Sybille Schmitz as Vilma, his wife
- Walter Franck as Prof. Wolf
- Aribert Wäscher as Ehrenberg, Geheimrat (privy council)
- Siegfried Schürenberg as Werner Baumann
- Willi Schur as Karl Schumacher, Steiger (mining foreman)
- Gustav Püttjer as Becker, hewer
- Klaus Pohl as Stöppke, hewer
- Oskar Höcker as Luppe, hewer
- Max Gülstorff as Neumeier, inspector of mines
- Otto Wernicke as Wolter, chief engineer
- Hans Hermann Schaufuß as Fischer, chief clerk
