= Paganini (1934 film) =

1934 film

- German film poster
- German: Gern hab' ich die Frau'n geküßt
- Directed by: E. W. Emo
- Written by: Bela Jenbach (libretto); Paul Knepler (libretto); Georg Zoch
- Based on: Paganini by Franz Lehár
- Produced by: Helmut Eweler; Alfred Greven; Franz Tappers
- Starring: Iván Petrovich; Eliza Illiard; Theo Lingen; Adele Sandrock
- Cinematography: Ewald Daub
- Edited by: Martha Dübber
- Music by: Franz Lehár
- Production company: Majestic-Film
- Distributed by: Neue Deutsche Lichtspiel-Syndikat Verleih (NDLS)
- Release date: 3 July 1934
- Running time: 87 minutes
- Country: Germany
- Language: German

Paganini or I Liked Kissing Women (German: Gern hab' ich die Frau'n geküßt) is a 1934 German operetta film directed by E. W. Emo and starring Iván Petrovich, Eliza Illiard, and Theo Lingen. It is an adaptation of Franz Lehár's 1925 operetta Paganini.

== Cast ==
- Iván Petrovich as Paganini
- Eliza Illiard as Duchess Anna Elisa of Lucca
- Theo Lingen as her court chamberlain Pimpinelli
- Adele Sandrock as her lady-in-waiting Gräfin Zanelli
- Maja Feist as her court lady Comtesse Jeanne d'Anvier
- Rudolf Klein-Rogge as Count Hédouville, courier to Napoleon
- Aribert Wäscher as theatre director Sebaldus Manzetti
- Erika Glässner as Thalia, his wife
- Maria Beling as Bella, her niece
- Veit Harlan as Enrico Tortoni, member of the troupe Manzetti
- Gustav Mahncke as commander of the body guard of Duchess Anna Elisa
- Erich Dunskus as inn keeper
- Franz Weber as servant
- Egon Brosig
- Karl Harbacher
- Hans Hemes
- Wolfgang von Schwindt
