= Maria Beling =

German actress (1915–1994)

- Born: 24 June 1915; Mannheim, German Empire
- Died: 1994 (aged 78–79); Germany
- Occupations: Actress, Singer
- Years active: 1933-1943 (film)

Maria Beling (1915-1994) was a German soprano and film actress.

== Selected filmography ==
- The Black Forest Girl (1933)
- Bashful Felix (1934)
- Paganini (1934)
- The Voice of Love (1934)
- A Woman Who Knows What She Wants (1934)
- Verlieb' dich nicht am Bodensee (1935)

== Bibliography ==
- Waldman, Harry. Nazi Films in America, 1933-1942. McFarland, 2008.
