= Walter Franck =

German actor (1896–1961)

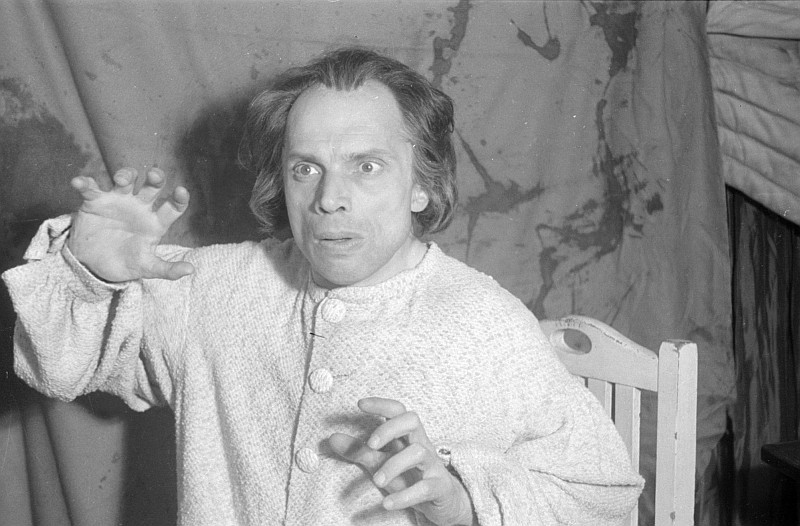
- Born: 16 April 1896; Hüttensteinach, German Empire
- Died: 10 August 1961 (aged 65); Garmisch-Partenkirchen, West Germany
- Occupation: Actor
- Years active: 1926–1952

Walter Franck (16 April 1896 – 10 August 1961) was a German film actor. He appeared in 32 films between 1926 and 1952.

== Selected filmography ==
- Master of the World (1934)
- The Island (1934)
- Streak of Steel (1935)
- Escapade (1936)
- Stronger Than Regulations (1936)
- Togger (1937)
- Der Kaiser von Kalifornien (1936)
- The Deruga Case (1938)
- Rubber (1938)
- Alarm at Station III (1939)
- The Governor (1939)
- The Girl from Barnhelm (1940)
- Between Hamburg and Haiti (1940)
- The Years Pass (1945)
- Blocked Signals (1948)
- The Prisoner (1949)
- The Lie (1950)
- The Deadly Dreams (1951)
- When the Heath Dreams at Night (1952)
