= A Woman Who Knows What She Wants (German version) =

1934 film

- German film poster
- German: Eine Frau, die weiß, was sie will
- Directed by: Victor Janson
- Written by: Peter Franke; Alfred Grünwald (libretto); Ernst Hasselbach; Louis Verneuil (libretto)
- Starring: Lil Dagover; Anton Edthofer; Anton Walbrook
- Cinematography: Eduard Hoesch; Jan Stallich
- Edited by: Roger von Norman
- Music by: Oscar Straus
- Production company: Meissner
- Release date: 29 September 1934
- Country: Czechoslovakia
- Language: German

A Woman Who Knows What She Wants (German: Eine Frau, die weiß, was sie will) is a 1934 Czechoslovak musical comedy film directed by Victor Janson and starring Lil Dagover, Anton Edthofer, and Anton Walbrook, a German-language version of Czech film A Woman Who Knows What She Wants. It is an adaptation of a 1932 stage musical of the same title, with music by Oscar Straus. It was filmed at the Barrandov Studios in Prague.

The musical was adapted again as a 1958 West German film of the same title.

== Cast ==
- Lil Dagover as Mona Cavallini, Revuestar
- Anton Edthofer as Erik Mattisson, industrialist
- Maria Beling as Karin, his daughter
- Anton Walbrook as Axel Basse
- Kurt Vespermann as Peter Kasten
- Hans Junkermann as Dr. Frank Heyberg, lawyer
- Werner Finck as Kalmann, press secretary
- Hubert von Meyerinck as Lynge, banker
- Inge John as Kalman's secretary
- Leo Peukert as Almers, director
- Pepi Glöckner-Kramer as Babette, wardrobe mistress
- Franz Scharwenka as President of Paranarena
- Carl Wilhelm Tetting as his Adjutant
- Michael von Newlinsky as Prim
