= Every Day Isn't Sunday (1935 film) =

1935 German film

- Directed by: Walter Janssen
- Written by: Hans Vietzke; Max Wallner; Georg Zoch
- Produced by: Hermann Schmidt; Kurt Ulrich
- Starring: Adele Sandrock; Wolfgang Liebeneiner; Carola Höhn
- Cinematography: Georg Krause
- Edited by: Fritz C. Mauch
- Music by: Will Meisel
- Production company: Delta-Film Berlin
- Release date: 8 March 1935
- Running time: 91 minutes
- Country: Germany
- Language: German

Every Day Isn't Sunday (German: Alle Tage ist kein Sonntag) is a 1935 German comedy film directed by Walter Janssen and starring Adele Sandrock, Wolfgang Liebeneiner and Carola Höhn. It shares its name with an unrelated 1959 film of the same title. Both films feature the popular song of the same name by Carl Clewing. It was shot at the EFA Studios in Berlin. The film's sets were designed by the art director Heinrich Richter.

== Cast ==
- Adele Sandrock as Frau Faber
- Wolfgang Liebeneiner as Erich Sieber, ihr Enkel
- Wilhelm P. Krüger as Heinrich Peters
- Carola Höhn as Margot, seine Tochter
- Erich Kestin as Walter Neumann, Siebers Freund
- Paul Henckels as Hermann Wagner, Zigarrenhändler
- Anni Markart as Hanni Wittler, Verkäuferin
- Vivigenz Eickstedt as Architekt Zimmermann
- Erich Fiedler as Roeder, Hochstaple
- Willi Schaeffers as Dr. Marr, sein Komplize
- Hans Nerking as Kriminalkommissar Meißner
- Hellmuth Passarge as Erster Geselle

== Bibliography ==
- James L. Limbacher. Haven't I seen you somewhere before?: Remakes, sequels, and series in motion pictures and television, 1896-1978. Pierian Press, 1979.
- Klaus, Ulrich J. Deutsche Tonfilme: Jahrgang 1933. Klaus-Archiv, 1988.
