= The Fugitive from Chicago =

1934 German film directed by Johannes Meyer

- Directed by: Johannes Meyer
- Written by: Max W. Kimmich; Hermann Oberländer; Hans Martin Cremer; Curt J. Braun (novel)
- Produced by: Otto Ernst Lubitz
- Starring: Gustav Fröhlich; Hubert von Meyerinck; Luise Ullrich; Lil Dagover
- Cinematography: Franz Koch
- Edited by: Gottlieb Madl
- Music by: Hans Carste
- Production company: Atlanta Film
- Distributed by: Bavaria Film; Hugo Engel Film (Austria)
- Release dates: 31 January 1934 (Munich); 22 February 1934 (Berlin)
- Running time: 108 minutes
- Country: Germany
- Language: German

The Fugitive from Chicago (German: Der Flüchtling aus Chicago) is a German crime and adventure movie produced in 1933 by director Johannes Meyer. The screenplay was written by Max W. Kimmich, Hermann Oberländer and Hans Martin Cremer after the 1932 novel of the same title by Curt J. Braun. The film was a co-production between the film companies of Bavaria (situated in Geiselgasteig near Munich, where most scenes were shot at the Bavaria Studios) and Atalanta (situated in Berlin). Some scenes were shot at German motorcycle company Zündapp. The film's sets were designed by the art directors Max Seefelder and Erich Zander. It passed censorship on 23 January 1934 and was presented to the public on 31 January 1934 in Munich and on 22 February 1934 in Berlin.

== Story ==
Werner Dux, heir to "Dux-Werke", a major maker of cars and motorcycles, is a gambler who has just been arrested in Chicago for shooting a cardsharper. In jail he learns that his father has died, leaving Dux-Werke without a leader, given that Werner's cousin and co-heiress Steffie is still too young to run the firm. In this situation, Werner convinces his friend Michael, who is an engineer by profession, to take over the firm as long as he is in custody and to pose as him. Michael agrees and actually turns the business around. He even organizes an endurance test for motorcycles via Konstantinopel, Rome and Barcelona, which results in a big Turkish order for the company. This wins him Steffie's respect (although she considers him to be Werner).

When the real Werner escapes from jail and arrives in Germany needing money, he persuades Michael to stay in place and hand over all profits of the firm to him. But meanwhile, Michael has become interested in Steffie and feels bad for betraying her. He goes on a holiday in a secluded lodge, and after his return, he is somehow changed. Steffie is worried he might have met another woman and demands an explanation from him, but Michael is not able to give her one. Now Werner arrives and begins to court Steffie, who does not recognize him. Still unhappy about Michaels behaviour, she follows Werner to his villa, but when he tries to approach her, she rejects him. Deeply offended, he reveals his identity, and now Steffie understands why Michael has withdrawn from her.

One day, Werner is shot dead, and Michael is suspected to be his murderer. The only one who believes in his innocence is Steffie. Shortly before his sentencing, the real murderer is arrested. After his release, Michael disappears without a trace. Having looked for him everywhere in vain, Steffie hopes to finally see him at the endurance test race. The ambitious Michael actually makes an appearance here, and Steffie can finally embrace him.

== Staff ==
actor	role
Gustav Fröhlich	Michael Nissen, engineer
Hubert von Meyerinck	Werner Dux, his friend
Luise Ullrich	Steffie Dux, Werner's cousin
Lil Dagover	Eveline
Otto Wernicke	Wolke, foreman
Adele Sandrock	Miss von Zackenthin
Paul Kemp	August P. Lemke, bookkeeper
Willy Dohm	Billy
Ernst Dumcke	general manager von Oetten
Lilo Müller	Ruth Müller
Armand Zaepfel	Smith, detective superintendent
Fritz Greiner	
Max Weydner	

== Reception ==
The film, which was rated as "not suitable for adolescents" by censors of the propaganda ministry, did nevertheless receive the attribute "artistically" by the same institution. The attribute meant that the distributors and cinemas had to pay less entertainment tax when showing this film. It was also shown to many other European countries; the following year, it made its debut in Denmark on 5 August and in Finland on 25 August. Foreign-language versions were also produced for Italy (L´evaso di Chicago), Greece (O asotos yios) and Czechoslovakia (Uprchlik z Chicaga). To US cinema-goers, the film was first shown on 15 March 1936.
