= The Voice of Love (film) =

1934 film

- Maria Beling and Marcel Wittrisch
- Directed by: Victor Janson
- Written by: Paul Beyer (idea); Peter Francke; Walter Wassermann
- Produced by: Erich Schicker; Karl Schulz; Robert Wüllner
- Starring: Marcel Wittrisch; Maria Beling; Marieluise Claudius
- Cinematography: Carl Drews
- Edited by: Roger von Norman
- Music by: Eduard Künneke
- Production company: Terra Film
- Distributed by: Terra Film
- Release date: 3 January 1934
- Running time: 76 minutes
- Country: Germany
- Language: German

The Voice of Love (German: Die Stimme der Liebe) is a 1934 German musical comedy film directed by Victor Janson and starring Marcel Wittrisch, Maria Beling, Marieluise Claudius. It was in the tradition of operetta films. It portrays a complex series of interactions between a celebrated tenor and a female music student who has decided to romantically pursue him.

The film's sets were designed by the art director Fritz Maurischat.

== Cast ==
- Marcel Wittrisch as Kammersänger Ekhardt
- Maria Beling as Cläre
- Marieluise Claudius as Zenzi
- Kurt Vespermann as Seppl, Ekhardt Diener
- Oskar Sima as Der Wirt
- Karl Platen as Der Korrepetitor
- Vicky Werckmeister as Die Köchin
- Fritz Alberti as Der Graf
- Otto Sauter-Sarto as Ein Gast
- Tina Eilers as Die Freundin
- Arthur Reppert as Der Feuerwehrmann
- Charlotte Boerner as Die Kaiserin
- Gustav Püttjer as Standfotograf

== Bibliography ==
- Waldman, Harry. Nazi Films in America, 1933–1942. McFarland, 2008.
