= You Are Adorable, Rosmarie =

- Directed by: Hans von Wolzogen
- Written by: Hans Vietzke; Max Wallner
- Produced by: Herbert F.R. Schulz
- Starring: Herta Worell; Hans Stüwe; Hans Adalbert Schlettow
- Cinematography: Herbert Körner
- Music by: Walter Sieber; Eberhard Storch; Werner Schmidt-Boelcke
- Production company: Adler Film Herbert F.R. Schulz
- Distributed by: Lux Film (Austria)
- Release date: 20 April 1934
- Running time: 95 minutes
- Country: Germany
- Language: German

You Are Adorable, Rosmarie (German: Du bist entzückend, Rosmarie!) is a 1934 German romantic comedy film directed by Hans von Wolzogen and starring Herta Worell, Hans Stüwe and Hans Adalbert Schlettow.

Location shooting took place around Salzkammergut.

== Cast ==
- Herta Worell as Rosl vom Traunsee
- Hans Stüwe as Frank Quick
- Hans Adalbert Schlettow as Sepp, ein Holzfäller
- Trude Brionne as Mizzi, Wirtschafterin im 'Almblick'
- Gustl Gstettenbaur as Peperl, Piccolo im 'Almblick'
- Olga Engl as Mrs. Quick, Chefin der Quick-Autowerke
- Otto Sauter-Sarto as Thomas Loibner, Wirt vom 'Almblick'
- Ery Bos as Lilian Chester, Tochter
- Paul Otto as Archibald Chester, Chef der Chester-Pneuwerke
- Max Gülstorff as Grimby, Franks Kammerdiener
- Kurt Vespermann as Tom Chester
- Robert Thiem as Tim Walker, Toms Freund
- Otto Kronburger as Loisl Huttenschwanderer

== Bibliography ==
- Alfred Krautz. International directory of cinematographers, set- and costume designers in film, Volume 4. Saur, 1984.
