= Ernst Dumcke =

German actor (1887–1940)

Ernst Dumcke (13 November 1887 – 21 June 1940) was a German film actor.

Ernst Dumcke was married to the actress Traute Carlsen from 1913 to 1915. In 1932 he married the Jewish woman Lise-Lotte Koopmann.

== Selected filmography ==
- Panik in Chicago (1931)
- Madame Makes Her Exit (1932)
- Under False Flag (1932)
- My Friend the Millionaire (1932)
- Grandstand for General Staff (1932)
- The Countess of Monte Cristo (1932)
- The Burning Secret (1933)
- Song of the Black Mountains (1933)
- The Fugitive From Chicago (1933)
- Spies at Work (1933)
- Happy Days in Aranjuez (1933)
- The Last Waltz (1934)
- A Woman With Power of Attorney (1934)
- Hangmen, Women and Soldiers (1935)
- The King's Prisoner (1935)
- Girls in White (1936)
- Family Parade (1936)
- The Chief Witness (1937)
- The Glass Ball (1937)
- The Night of Decision (1938)
- Hello Janine! (1939)
- The Life and Loves of Tschaikovsky (1939)

== Literature ==
- Kay Weniger: Das große Personenlexikon des Films. Zweiter Band C – F. John Paddy Carstairs – Peter Fitz, Schwarzkopf und Schwarzkopf Verlag, Berlin 2001, ISBN 3-89602-340-3, p. 471.
- Dumcke, Ernst, in: Ernst Klee: Das Kulturlexikon zum Dritten Reich. Wer war was vor und nach 1945. Frankfurt am Main: S. Fischer, 2007, ISBN 978-3-10-039326-5, p. 124
