= Calau =

Calau Kalawa
- Town
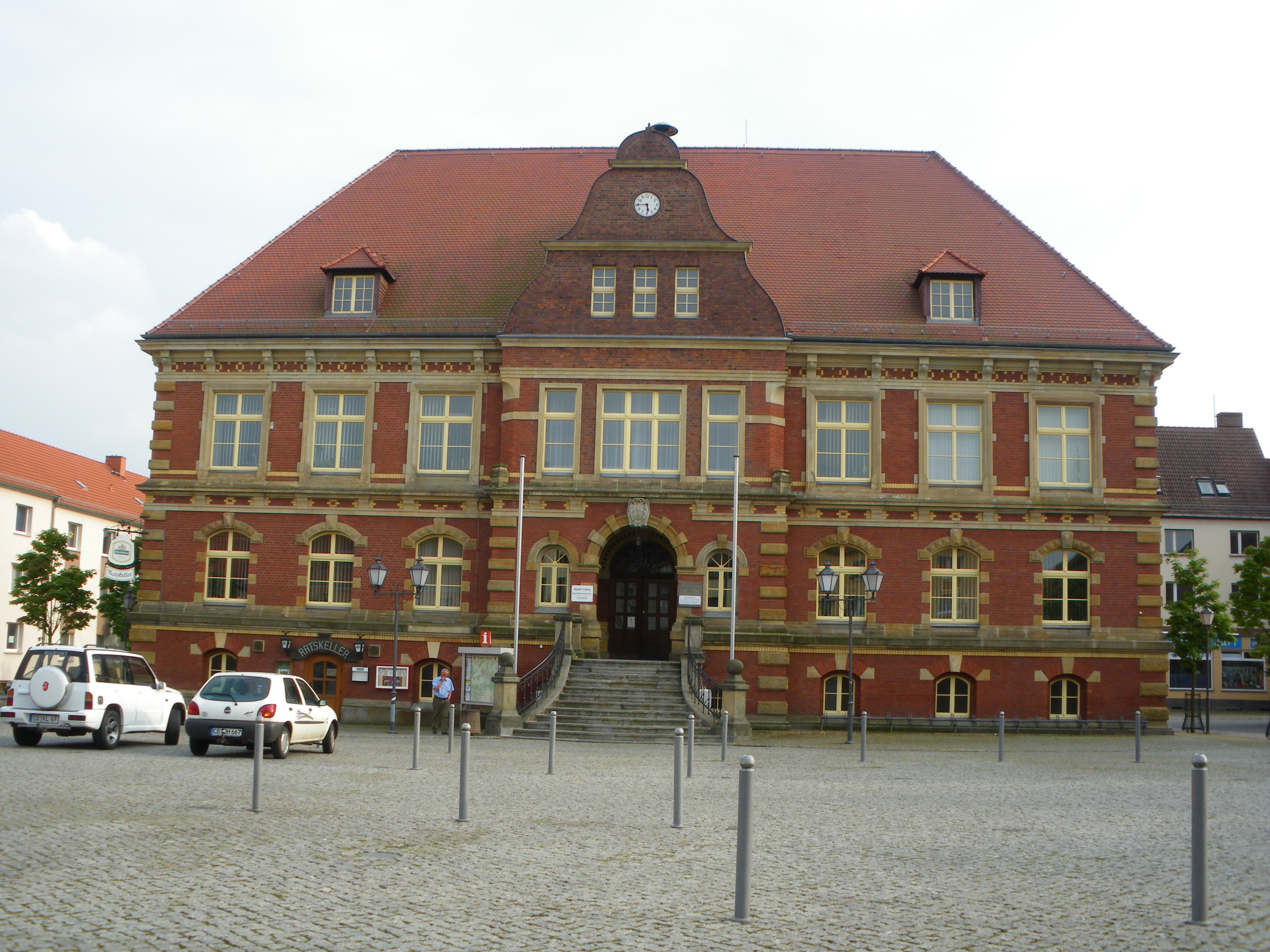
- Town hall of Calau

- Coat of arms

- Location of Calau within Oberspreewald-Lausitz district
- Interactive map of Calau
- Location within Germany Location within Brandenburg
- Coordinates: 51°44′45″N 13°57′03″E
- Country: Germany
- State: Brandenburg
- District: Oberspreewald-Lausitz
- Subdivisions: Town of Calau and 11 Ortsteile

Government
  - Mayor (2023–31): Marco Babenz (Ind.)

Area
  - Total: 163.5 km^{2} (63.1 sq mi)
- Elevation: 93 m (305 ft)

Population (2025-12-31)
  - Total: 7,582
  - Density: 46.37/km^{2} (120.1/sq mi)
- Demonym(s): German: Calauer; Lower Sorbian: Kalawar (m.), Kalawarka (f.)
- Time zone: UTC+01:00 (CET)
  - Summer (DST): UTC+02:00 (CEST)
- Postal codes: 03205
- Dialling codes: 03541
- Vehicle registration: OSL, CA, SFB
- Website: www.calau.de/

Calau (German pronunciation: [ˈkaːlaʊ]; Lower Sorbian: Kalawa, pronounced [ˈkalawa]) is a small town in the Oberspreewald-Lausitz district, in southern Brandenburg, in eastern Germany. It is situated 14 km south of Lübbenau, and 27 km west of Cottbus. Calau is also called the home of the Kalauer.

== Geography ==
The Town of Calau is situated in the middle of Lower Lusatia, about 27 km west of Cottbus at the eastern edge of the Lower Lusatian Ridge Nature Park as well as at the southern edge of the famous Spree Forest.

The area around Calau is strongly characterized by former lignite mining sites, which are valuable retreat areas for animals and plants nowadays. Many places are left to nature after recultivation, The Heinz Sielmann Foundation adopted numerous areas, others are managed near-natural and sustainably by the state forest administration. Foresters offer walking tours through the region. Particularly the "Geologische und Naturlehrpfad Luttchensberg" is a sight to see.

=== Town subdivisions ===
- Stadt Calau
- Ortsteil Bolschwitz
- Ortsteil Buckow
- Ortsteil Craupe with Radensdorf and Schrakau
- Ortsteil Gollmitz with Settinchen
- Ortsteil Groß Jehser with Erpitz and Mallenchen
- Ortsteil Groß-Mehßow with Klein Mehßow
- Ortsteil Kemmen with Säritz und Schadewitz
- Ortsteil Mlode with Rochusthal
- Ortsteil Saßleben with Kalkwitz and Reuden
- Ortsteil Werchow with Cabel (Village) and Plieskendorf
- Ortsteil Zinnitz with Bathow (Village)
  - Zinnitz has about 300 residents. It was first mentioned in 1255 as Cinnicz. The Name means Ort wo Rohr/Schilf wächst (Place where cane/reed is growing). Known citizen of Zinnitz is Dietrich III. von Bocksdorf, bishop of Naumburg from 1463 to 1466.

== History ==
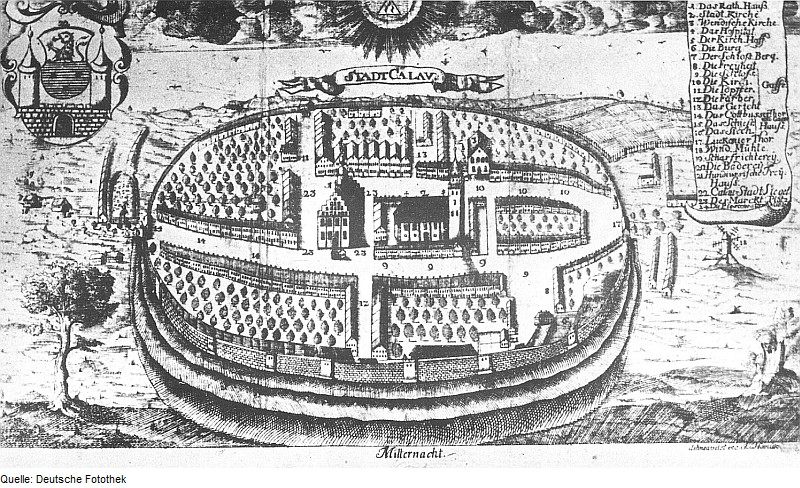
Calau in 1758

The town was first mentioned, as Calowe, in 1279. Its name is of Slavic origin and comes from the old Sorbian and Polish word kał, which means "swamp" or "bog". The town was at various times ruled by Bohemian, Hungarian, Saxon and Polish monarchs, before it was annexed by Prussia in 1815. It was located on an important trade route, called the "Salt Road", which was used to transport salt from Halle to Lusatia and further east to Poland. From 1815 to 1947, Calau was part of the Prussian Province of Brandenburg.

From 1952 to 1990, it was part of the Bezirk Cottbus of East Germany.

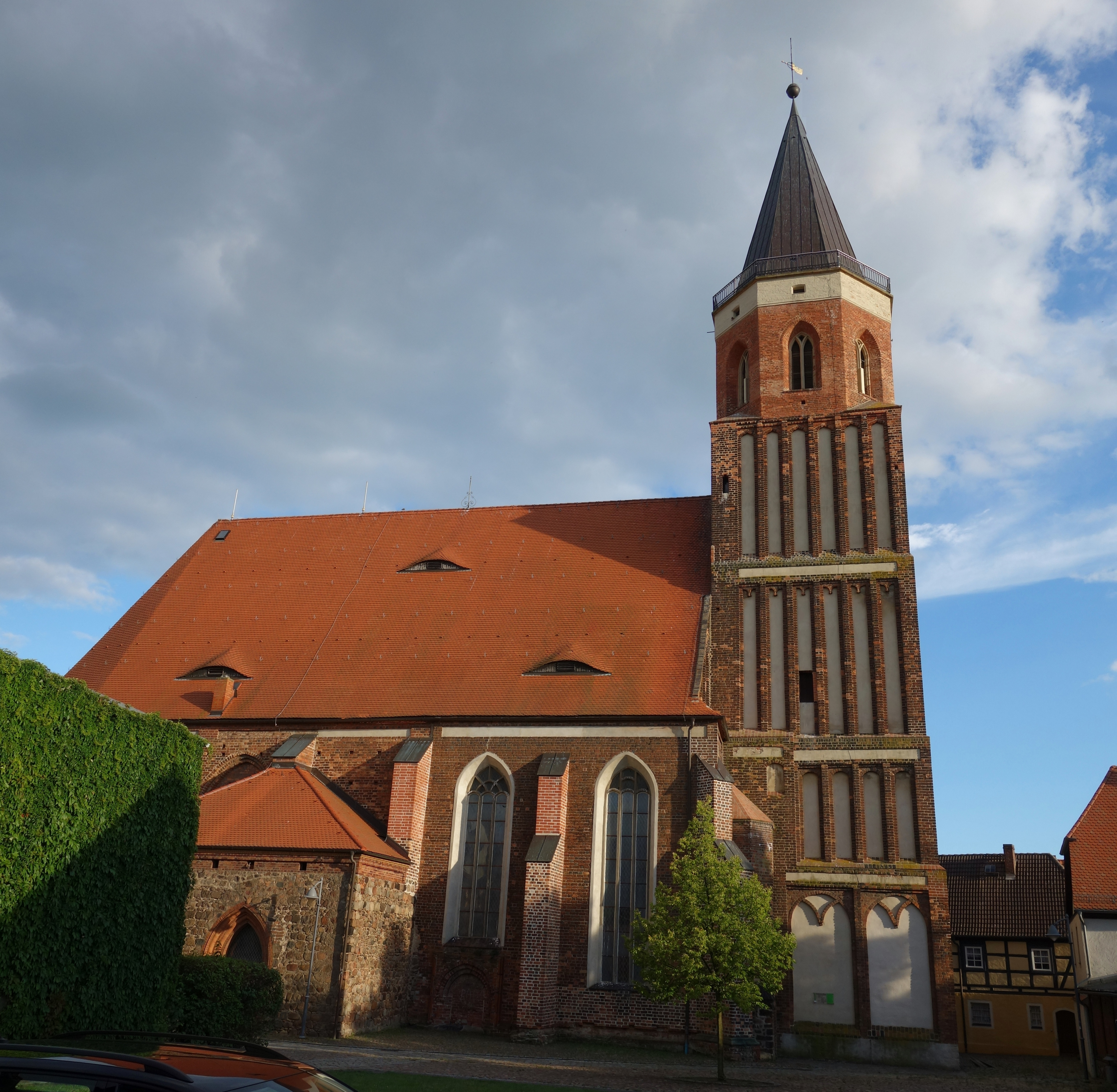
Parish church

== Population ==
There are only a few people with Sorbian roots living in Calau today, although the Sorbs were quite a large minority in 1843 with about 30.8 percent of the overall population. In following years the number of Sorbs decreased rapidly, and in 1900 only 3.5 percent of the population were Sorbs.

=== Demography ===
Development of Population since 1875 within the Current Boundaries (Blue Line: Population; Dotted Line: Comparison to Population Development of Brandenburg state; Grey Background: Time of Nazi rule; Red Background: Time of Communist rule)

Recent Population Development and Projections (Population Development before Census 2011 (blue line); Recent Population Development according to the Census in Germany in 2011 (blue bordered line); Official projections for 2005-2030 (yellow line); for 2017-2030 (scarlet line); for 2020-2030 (green line)

Calau: Population development
within the current boundaries (2020)

Year	Pop.	±% p.a.
1875	7,359	—
1890	7,266	−0.08%
1910	7,536	+0.18%
1925	7,942	+0.35%
1939	8,303	+0.32%
1950	11,045	+2.63%
1964	11,155	+0.07%

Year	Pop.	±% p.a.
1971	11,378	+0.28%
1981	10,496	−0.80%
1985	10,638	+0.34%
1990	10,710	+0.13%
1995	10,317	−0.74%
2000	9,809	−1.00%
2005	9,222	−1.23%

Year	Pop.	±% p.a.
2010	8,522	−1.57%
2015	7,833	−1.67%
2016	7,836	+0.04%
2017	7,789	−0.60%
2018	7,769	−0.26%
2019	7,720	−0.63%
2020	7,734	+0.18%

== Politics ==
=== Mayor ===
Werner Suchner (independent) was elected in 2009 with 55,3 % of the vote.

=== Municipal Assembly ===
The municipal assembly (Stadtverordnetenversammlung) consists of 18 "Stadtverordneten" plus the "Buergermeister" (town mayor).

- The Left: 6 seats
- Christian Democratic Union: 4 seats
- Social Democratic Party of Germany: 3 seats
- Free Voters: 2 seats
- Alliance '90/The Greens: 1 seats
- Free Democratic Party: 1 seat
- German Social Union: 1 seat

(Stand: Kommunalwahl am 28. September 2008)

=== International relations ===
- Viersen, Germany
- Valdivia, Chile

=== Historical sites ===
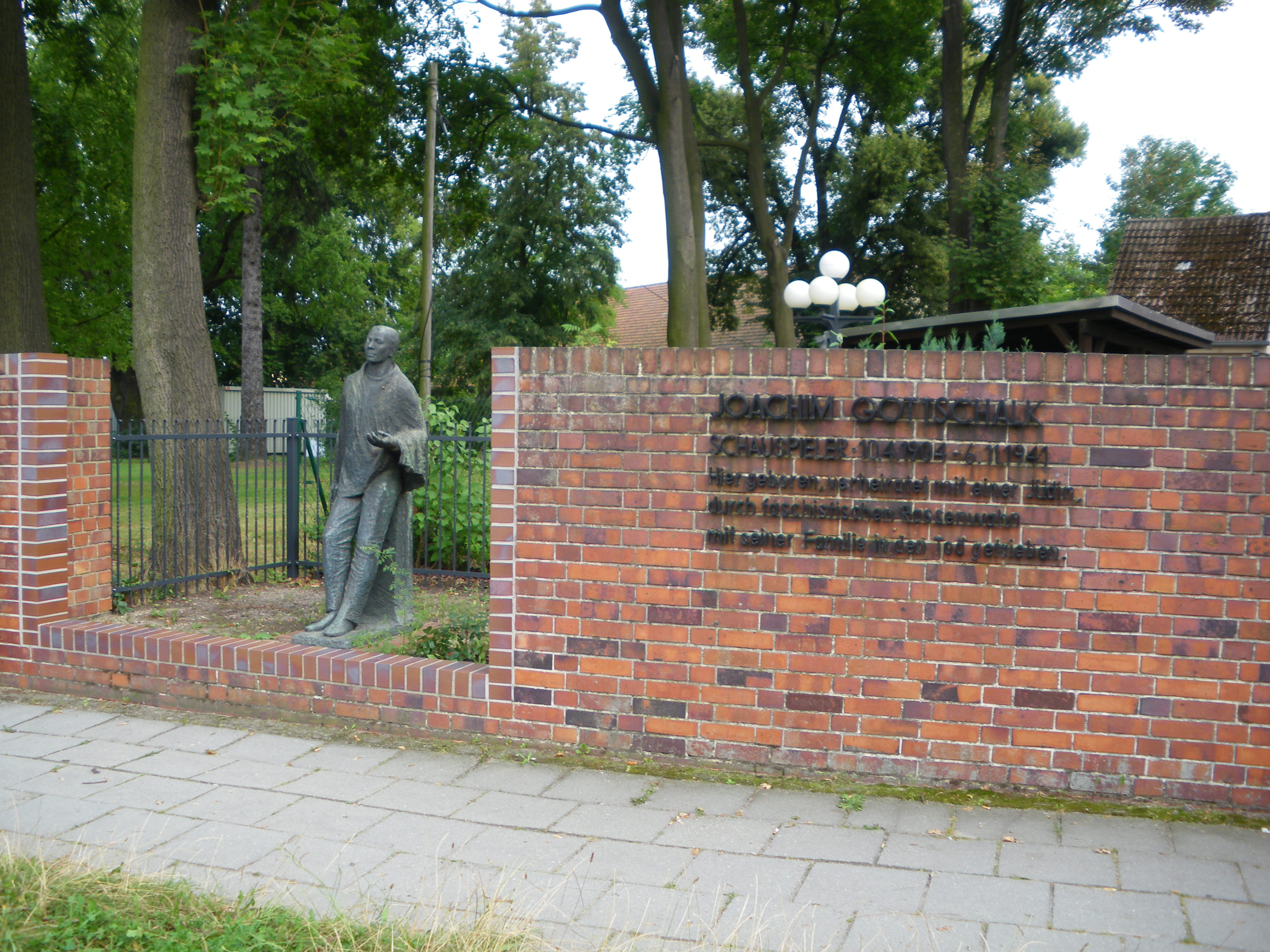
Memorial for Joachim Gottschalk

- Memorial at the Karl-Marx-Straße/Ecke Parkstraße, 1928 initially dedicated to the first President of Germany, Friedrich Ebert, destroyed by the Nazis in 1933, to be dedicated to the victims of Nazism in 1948, rededicated again in 1989 to the victims of Fascism and Stalinism
- Memorial for actor Joachim Gottschalk. When his Jewish wife Meta and son Michael were to be deported, the whole family decided to commit suicide on November 6, 1941. The bronze figure, which was created by Theo Balden in 1967, resembles the actor. It was initially located in a park but had to be moved due to the building of the local Sparkasse in the 1990s. Its new place is a memorial wall in the Joachim-Gottschalk-Straße 35.

== Economy and infrastructure ==
The transmitter station Calau, which belongs to the Deutsche Telekom radiates a variety of VHF-and TV-programmes of the rbb for Brandenburg. Its radio mast is a reinforced concrete tower of 190 m height, the so-called "Langer Calauer", in the southwest of town. It was built in 1982.

=== Traffic ===
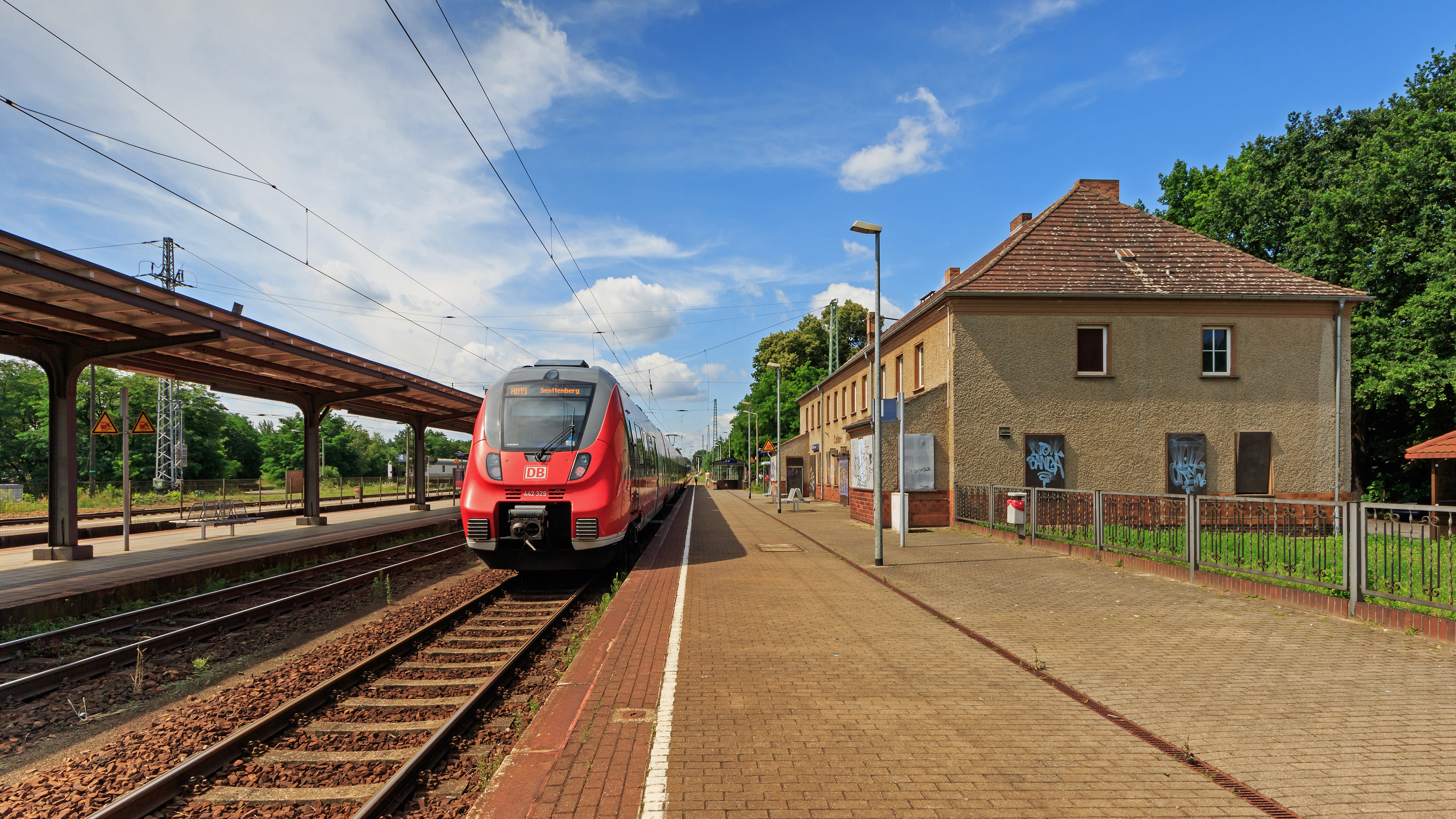
Calau train station

There are no Bundesstraßen going through Calau, the motorway junction Calau is seven km to the northwest at the A 13.

Calau is situated at the railroad lines Cottbus–Leipzig and Lübbenau–Senftenberg.

=== Edification ===
==== Schools ====
- Primary school Calau, named Carl-Anwandter-Grundschule since 2008
- Comprehensive school, named Robert-Schlesier-Schule since 2007
- Academic high school, named Carl-Anwandter-Gymnasium Calau (closed since 2008)

== Personalities ==
- Dietrich von Bocksdorf (b. 1410 in Zinnitz – 1466 in Naumburg), bishop of Naumburg
- Valentin Naboth (1523–1593) mathematician, astronomer and astrologer
- Martin Naboth (1675–1721), doctor

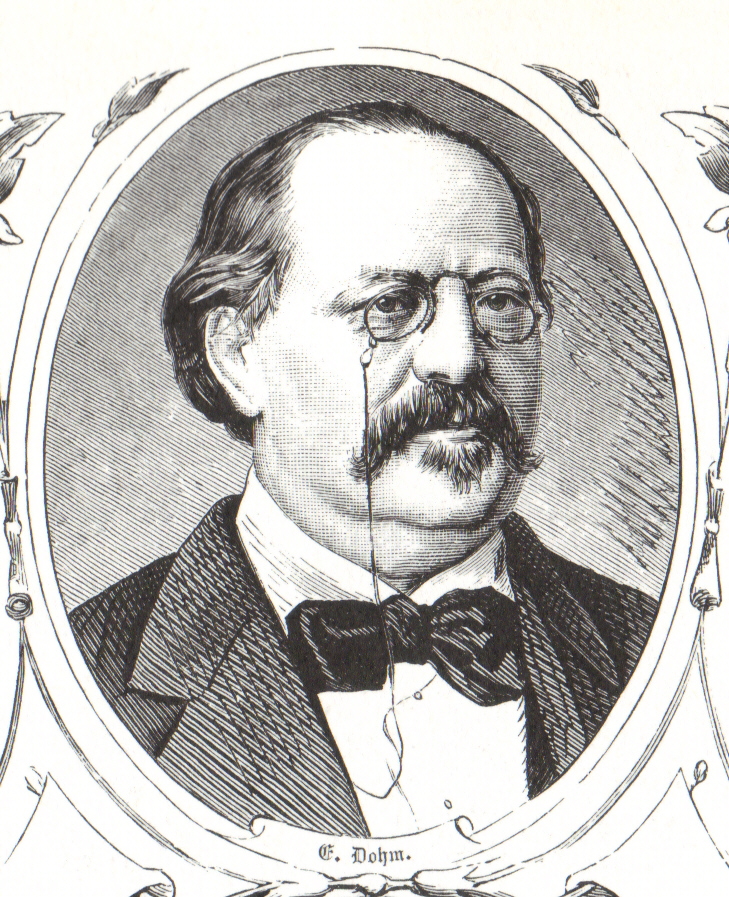
Ernst Dohm 1879

- Carl Anwandter (1801–1889), stands out as leader of the first contingent of German colonists sent by Philippi; Anwandter is also founder of the German school Valdivia (Chile)
- Ernst Dohm (1819–1883), editor and writer, helped the pun in his journal Kladderadatsch to regional awareness
- Erasmus Robert Freiherr von Patow (1804–1890), Prussian politician
- Joachim Gottschalk (1904–1941), stage and film actor
- Sebastian Wolf (1989), artist
