= Effi Briest (disambiguation) =

Effi Briest is an 1894 German novel by Theodor Fontane

It may also refer to the following films based on the novel:

- Effi Briest (1971 film), East German film directed by Wolfgang Luderer
- Effi Briest (1974 film), West German film directed by Rainer Werner Fassbinder
- Effi Briest (2009 film), German film
