= Disgrace (disambiguation) =

Disgrace is a 1999 novel by J. M. Coetzee.

Disgrace may also refer to:

- Disgrace (1929 film), a Czech-German silent film
- Disgrace (2008 film), an adaptation of the 1999 novel by JM Coetzee

== See also ==
- Disgraced (disambiguation)
