= Otto Lehmann =

Otto Lehmann may refer to:

- Otto Lehmann (physicist) (1855–1922), German physicist
- Otto Lehmann (movie producer) (1889–1968), German movie producer
