= The Eternal Curse (film) =

1921 film directed by Fritz Wendhausen

- Directed by: Fritz Wendhausen
- Written by: Fritz Wendhausen
- Produced by: Erich Pommer
- Starring: Charlotte Schultz; Rudolf Forster; Karl Etlinger
- Cinematography: Paul Holzki
- Production company: Decla-Bioscop
- Distributed by: UFA
- Release date: 27 December 1921
- Country: Germany
- Languages: Silent; German intertitles

The Eternal Curse (German: Der ewige Fluch) is a 1921 German silent drama film directed by Fritz Wendhausen and starring Charlotte Schultz, Rudolf Forster, and Karl Etlinger.

The film's sets were designed by the art director Walter Reimann and Hermann Warm. It was shot at the Babelsberg Studios in Berlin and on location in Hamburg.

== Cast ==
- Charlotte Schultz as Katje
- Rudolf Forster as Lyn
- Karl Etlinger as Sebastian Koningk
- Charles Willy Kayser as Jan Graat
- Max Kronert as Polizeikommissar
- Margarete Schlegel as Mädchen
- Emil Heyse as Coppenool
- Rosa Valetti

== Bibliography ==
- Hardt, Ursula (1996). From Caligari to California: Erich Pommer's Life in the International Film Wars. Providence: Berghahn Books. ISBN 978-1-57181-930-7.
