= Ernst Karchow =

German actor

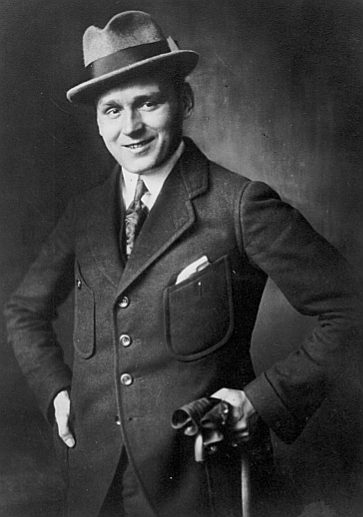
- Born: 23 September 1892; Berlin, German Empire
- Died: 7 October 1953 (aged 61); Wilmersdorf, West Germany
- Occupation: Actor
- Years active: 1927–1949 (film)

Ernst Karchow (1892–1953) was a German stage and film actor.

== Selected filmography ==
- Lotte (1928)
- We Stick Together Through Thick and Thin (1929)
- The Captain from Köpenick (1931)
- Inge and the Millions (1933)
- Gold (1934)
- Lady Windermere's Fan (1935)
- One Too Many on Board (1935)
- My Life for Maria Isabella (1935)
- The Traitor (1936)
- Patriots (1937)
- The Grey Lady (1937)
- Fanny Elssler (1937)
- The Deruga Case (1938)
- The Desert Song (1939)
- The Girl at the Reception (1940)
- Front Theatre (1942)
- The Master of the Estate (1943)
- Back Then (1943)
- Tonelli (1943)
- The Noltenius Brothers (1945)
- Night of the Twelve (1949)

== Bibliography ==
- Youngkin, Stephen. The Lost One: A Life of Peter Lorre. University Press of Kentucky, 2005.
