= Walter von Hollander =

German screenwriter

- Born: 29 January 1892; Blankenburg, Saxony-Anhalt; German Empire
- Died: 30 January 1973 (aged 81); Niendorf an der Stecknitz, Schleswig-Holstein; West Germany
- Occupation: Writer
- Years active: 1936–1964 (film)

Walter von Hollander (1892–1973) was a German screenwriter. He worked on several films directed by Georg Wilhelm Pabst.

== Selected filmography ==
- The Empress's Favourite (1936)
- Anna Favetti (1938)
- The Desert Song (1939)
- The Girl at the Reception (1940)
- The Comedians (1941)
- The Master of the Estate (1943)
- Mysterious Shadows (1949)
- The Stronger Woman (1953)

== Bibliography ==
- Kreimeier, Klaus. The Ufa Story: A History of Germany's Greatest Film Company, 1918-1945. University of California Press, 1999.
