= The Master of the Estate =

1943 film

- Directed by: Hans Deppe
- Written by: Walter von Hollander; Richard Riedel
- Based on: Der Majoratsherr von Halleborg by Alfred von Hedenstjerna
- Produced by: Richard Riedel
- Starring: Willy Birgel; Viktoria von Ballasko; Anneliese Uhlig
- Cinematography: Reimar Kuntze
- Edited by: Wolfgang Wehrum
- Music by: Hans-Otto Borgmann
- Production company: UFA
- Distributed by: Deutsche Filmvertriebs
- Release date: 6 June 1943
- Running time: 87 minutes
- Country: Germany
- Language: German

The Master of the Estate (German: Der Majoratsherr) is a 1943 German drama film directed by Hans Deppe and starring Willy Birgel, Viktoria von Ballasko and Anneliese Uhlig. Location shooting took place in Pomerania, Mecklenburg and Ramsau in the Bavarian Alps. The film's sets were designed by the art directors Otto Gülstorff and Carl Ludwig Kirmse. It is based on the 1895 Swedish novel Der Majoratsherr von Halleborg by Alfred von Hedenstjerna.

== Cast ==
- Willy Birgel as Bernhard von Halleborg
- Viktoria von Ballasko as Amelie von Linden
- Anneliese Uhlig as Julia Dahl
- Ernst Sattler as von Linden, Amelies Vater
- Heddo Schulenburg as Kurt, ihr Bruder
- Doris Holve as Christa, ihre Schwester
- Arthur Schröder as Dr. Osterkamp
- Harry Liedtke as Dr. Stempel
- Werner Scharf as Oskar von Halleborg
- Maria Locatelli as Cilli, seine Frau
- Knut Hartwig as Plate, Gutsinspektor
- Hedwig Wangel as Malena, Wirtschafterin
- Erwin Biegel as Karl, Diener
- Ernst Karchow as Professor Lindroth

== Bibliography ==
- Kreimeier, Klaus. The Ufa Story: A History of Germany's Greatest Film Company, 1918-1945. University of California Press, 1999.
- Rentschler, Eric. The Ministry of Illusion: Nazi Cinema and Its Afterlife. Harvard University Press, 1996.
