= Otto Lehmann (movie producer) =

Otto Lehmann (22 January 1889 in Berlin – 28 April 1968 in Munich) was a German movie producer.

== Career ==
Lehmann studied to be a teacher at the Lutheran seminary in Neuzelle. Upon graduation, he taught at primary and middle schools.

1925 Born in Berlin, joined as production manager for film and worked in that capacity, among other things for Gerhard Lamprecht's elaborate history paintings arc Old Fritz, the early Conrad Veidt-talkies The man who committed the murder and I and the Empress, the musical blockbuster Walzerkrieg from the hand of Ludwig Berger, Reinhold Schünzel's divine comedy Amphitryon and most recently, in 1936, directed by Johannes Meyer, again for a cinematic homage to the Prussian King Frederick the Great, Fridericus.

In 1936, he became popular in the popular play The Violet of Potsdamer Platz to the production manager from 1938 until the war ended Lehmann worked for the Terra as a manufacturing or production group leader. In this capacity he was also responsible for the production of Jud Süß, the most notorious anti-Semitic film of the Third Reich.

After the war, Lehmann acted for the East German DEFA as joint manager of the dubbing division of the old Tobis. His work as a production manager in 1947 he put away for a variety of West German firms, 1952-1955 exclusively for Carlton-film of the Munich-based producer Günther Stapenhorst.

At the age of 70, Lehmann ended his career in film production and worked until the fall of 1967 as production manager for television. He also occupied an official post, he was sometimes the first Chairperson of the Association of German production manager eV.

He is not to be confused with another Otto Lehmann, who briefly worked during the Second World War, as an actor in Swiss films.

== Filmography ==
- 1936: Das Veilchen vom Potsdamer Platz
- 1937: Meiseken
- 1937: An Enemy of the People
- 1937: Tango Notturno
- 1938: Secret Code LB 17
- 1938: Freight from Baltimore
- 1938: Liebelei und Liebe
- 1939: Escape in the Dark
- 1939: Central Rio
- 1939: Kornblumenblau
- 1939: Uproar in Damascus
- 1940: Jud Süß
- 1941: Leichte Muse
- 1941: Sein Sohn
- 1942: Front Theatre
- 1942/43: Music in Salzburg (UA: 1944)
- 1943/44: Seinerzeit zu meiner Zeit
- 1944: The Green Salon
- 1944: Tierarzt Dr. Vlimmen (unfinished film)
- 1947/48: Frauen, Masken und Dämonen (Documentary film)
- 1949: After the Rain Comes Sunshine
- 1950: Two Times Lotte
- 1951: Bluebeard
- 1952: The Forester's Daughter
- 1952: Alraune
- 1952: The White Horse Inn
- 1953: The Immortal Vagabond
- 1953: The Last Waltz
- 1954: Cabaret
- 1955: Königswalzer
- 1956: Between Time and Eternity
- 1957: Junger Mann, der alles kann
- 1958: Ist Mama nicht fabelhaft?
- 1959: Liebe, Luft und lauter Lügen
