= Disgraced (disambiguation) =

Disgraced may refer to:

- Disgraced!, a 1933 American pre-Code mystery film
- Disgraced, a 2012 play by novelist and screenwriter Ayad Akhtar
- Disgraced (2017 film), an Emmy Award-winning Showtime documentary on the 2003 murder of Baylor University basketball player Patrick Dennehy

== See also ==
- Disgraced In America, a song on the 2018 Room Inside the World album by Canadian art punk band, Ought
- Disgrace (disambiguation)
