= The Degenhardts =

1944 film

- Directed by: Werner Klingler
- Written by: Hans Gustl Kernmayr; Wilhelm Krug; Georg Zoch
- Produced by: Heinrich George
- Starring: Heinrich George; Ernst Schröder; Gunnar Möller; Renée Stobrawa
- Cinematography: Georg Bruckbauer
- Edited by: Ella Ensink
- Music by: Herbert Windt
- Production company: Tobis Filmkunst
- Distributed by: Deutsche Filmvertriebs
- Release date: 6 July 1944
- Running time: 93 minutes
- Country: Germany
- Language: German

The Degenhardts (German: Die Degenhardts) is a 1944 German drama film directed by Werner Klingler and starring Heinrich George, Ernst Schröder and Gunnar Möller. It was shot at the Grunewald Studios in Berlin and on location in Stralsund, Lüneburg and Lübeck. The film's sets were designed by the art director Fritz Lück and Fritz Maurischat.

== Plot ==
Karl Degenhardt, the patriarch of a family in Lübeck, leads his wife and five children through the opening stages of Second World War, culminating in the bombing of the city on 28 March 1942 by the Royal Air Force.

== Background ==
The film was part of a cycle of home front films produced in Germany during the war. The film was intended to fan anti-British sentiment and prepare Germans psychologically for the destruction of their cities by Allied bombing raids and invasions. It premiered in Lübeck on 6 July 1944.

== Cast ==
- Heinrich George as Karl Degenhardt
- Ernst Schröder as Jochem Degenhardt
- Gunnar Möller as Detlev Degenhardt
- Ernst Legal as Herr Sartorius
- Renée Stobrawa as Mutter Degenhardt
- Wolfgang Lukschy as Robert Degenhardt
- Ilse Petri as Christine Degenhardt
- Werner Pledath as Bürgermeister Herrmann
- Erich Ziegel as Inspector
- Herwart Grosse as Herr Jürgensen
- Knut Hartwig as Kersten
- Karl Kemper as Lorenzen
- Werner Kepich as Fürhälter
- Robert Forsch as Wendelin
- Günther Körner as Otto Degenhardt
- Walter Bechmann as Herr Krüger
- Hilde Jansen as Trude Degenhardt
- Alfred Maack as Wirt
- Trude Tandar as Wirtschafterin Quandel

== Bibliography ==
- O'Brien, Mary-Elizabeth. Nazi Cinema as Enchantment. The Politics of Entertainment in the Third Reich. Camden House, 2006.
