= Tonka of the Gallows =

1930 film directed by Karl Anton

- Directed by: Karel Anton
- Screenplay by: Benno Vigny; Willy Haas
- Based on: Die Himmelfahrt der Galgentoni by Egon Erwin Kisch
- Produced by: Karel Anton
- Starring: Ita Rina; Vera Baranovskaya; Josef Rovenský
- Cinematography: Eduard Hoesch
- Edited by: Karel Anton
- Music by: Erno Košťál
- Production company: Anton-film
- Distributed by: Elektafilm
- Release date: 27 February 1930 (Prague)
- Running time: 82 minutes
- Country: Czechoslovakia
- Languages: Czech; German; French

Tonka of the Gallows (Czech: Tonka Šibenice, French: Tonischka, German: Die Galgentoni) is a 1930 Czech drama film directed by Karl Anton and starring Ita Rina, Vera Baranovskaya and Josef Rovenský.

It is an adaptation of the novella Die Himmelfahrt der Galgentoni by Egon Erwin Kisch.

The movie was shot as a silent movie, but later Czech, German and French post-synchronized sound versions were made.

== Plot ==
The movie follows story of a country girl Tonka who lives in Prague and works as a prostitute unbeknownst to her family. One day a convicted murderer Prokůpek requests to spend a night with a girl before his execution. Policemen ask many prostitutes if they're willing to do this job, but all of them refuse except Tonka. As a result, none of her customers wants to visit her again and other prostitutes shun her.

== Cast ==
- Ita Rina as Tonka of the Gallows
- Vera Baranovskaya Tonka's mother
- Josef Rovenský as Murderer Prokůpek
- Jack Mylong-Münz as Jan
- Jindřich Plachta as Cabman
- Antonie Nedošinská as Whorehouse owner
- Emilie Nitschová as Chestnut seller
- Rudolf Štěpán as Executioner
- Felix Kühne as Salesman
- Theodor Pištěk as Drunkard
- Jan Sviták as Pimp
- Karel Jelínek as Whorehouse customer

== Production ==
Writer Egon Erwin Kisch allegedly met with a prostitute, named Antonie Havlová, who told him her life story shortly before her death in 1911. He wrote the novella Die Himmelfahrt der Galgentoni, which was supposedly based on her life, however no woman named Antonie Havlová was ever documented to be living in Prague in 1911. Shortly after the release of the book in 1921, a theatre play was produced at Revoluční scéna with Xena Longenová playing the main role. Karel Anton decided to make a silent movie based on the book. The shooting started in autumn 1929 at Kavalírka studio in Košíře. Unfortunately the stages burned down on 25 October together with some reels of the film. The movie was finished at AB studios in Vinohrady and it was decided to release the movie as a sound film. Czech, French and German post-synchrons were recorded at Gaumont Joinville studio in Paris.

== Reception ==
Tonka of the Gallows premiered at Alfa cinema in Prague on 27 February 1930. The movie was advertised as the "first Czech sound film". Contemporary critics mostly praised the movie with Filmový přehled writing "The impression with which I left the theatre was unforgettable and rivetting." In France Hebdo-Film wrote "Karl Anton has used all the means of expression offered by modern cinematographic techniques, but his personality has always allowed him to avoid the traps set by convention and sentimentality."

== Restoration ==
Only the French version survived to this day. From the Czech version only the beginning with Karel Hašler singing Hradčany krásné survived. The French version was digitally restored and released on DVD in 2016 by Národní filmový archiv. It was screened at MoMA in 2017 and San Francisco Silent Film Festival and Phoenix Cinema, London in 2019.

== Bibliography ==
- Brož, Jaroslav & Frída, Myrtil. Historie československého filmu v obrazech 1930 – 1945, Orbis, Prague, 1966.
