= Central Rio =

- Directed by: Erich Engels
- Written by: Berthold Ebbecke; Ludwig Metzger
- Based on: ...schoß Chiquita? by Rolf Dortenwald
- Produced by: Otto Lehmann
- Starring: Leny Marenbach; Camilla Horn; Ita Rina
- Cinematography: Walter Pindter
- Edited by: Alice Ludwig
- Music by: Werner Eisbrenner
- Production company: Terra Film
- Distributed by: Terra Film
- Release date: 5 October 1939
- Running time: 80 minutes
- Country: Germany
- Language: German

Central Rio (German: Zentrale Rio) is a 1939 German crime film directed by Erich Engels and starring Leny Marenbach, Camilla Horn and Ita Rina.

The film's sets were designed by the art director Willi Herrmann. It was shot at the Terra Studios in Berlin and on location in Hamburg.

== Synopsis ==
A German woman's husband has been missing for years and is presumed dead. Then she receives information that is alive and living in Brazil. She resolves to travel to Rio de Janeiro to find out the truth.

== Cast ==
- Leny Marenbach as Maria Halmborg
- Camilla Horn as Diane Mercier
- Ita Rina as Chiquita Salieri
- Werner Fuetterer as Michael Wenk
- Iván Petrovich as Ricardo Perez
- Hans Zesch-Ballot as Kommissar Dossa
- Leo Peukert as Kommissar Gaveira
- Paul Hoffmann as Marquez Cabana
- Reinhold Bernt as Sergeant Carmo
- Axel Monjé as Sergeant Gonzaga
- Käte Kühl as Bonita
- Walther Süssenguth as Schmuggler
- Marianne Simson as Solotänzerin
- Else Ehser as Garderobiere
- Helmut Egiomue as Hotelboy Chico
- Rudi Schuricke as Sänger

== Bibliography ==
- Noack, Frank. Veit Harlan: The Life and Work of a Nazi Filmmaker. University Press of Kentucky, 2016.
- Tegel, Susan. Jew Suss: Life, Legend, Fiction, Film. A&C Black, 2011.
