= Anna Favetti =

1938 film

- Directed by: Erich Waschneck
- Written by: Walter von Hollander
- Based on: Licht im dunklen Haus by Walter von Hollander
- Produced by: Erich Waschneck
- Starring: Brigitte Horney; Mathias Wieman; Gina Falckenberg; Maria Koppenhöfer
- Cinematography: Werner Bohne
- Edited by: Walter Fredersdorf
- Music by: Werner Eisbrenner
- Production company: UFA
- Distributed by: UFA
- Release date: 28 April 1938
- Running time: 99 minutes
- Country: Germany
- Language: German

Anna Favetti is a 1938 German romantic drama film directed by Erich Waschneck and starring Brigitte Horney, Mathias Wieman and Gina Falckenberg. The screenplay was written by Walter von Hollander, adapted from his own novel Licht im dunklen Haus. The film was made at the Babelsberg Studios in Potsdam. Location filming took place in Italy and Switzerland. Its sets were designed by the art director Gustav A. Knauer.

== Cast ==
- Brigitte Horney as Anna Favetti
- Mathias Wieman as Hemmstreet
- Gina Falckenberg as Irene Hemmstreet
- Maria Koppenhöfer as Frau Favetti
- Friedrich Kayßler as Herr Favetti
- Karl Schönböck as Kingston
- Elsa Wagner as Frau Stetius
- Franz Schafheitlin as Dr. Thom
- Jeanette Bethge as Bertha
- Paul Bildt as Dr. Fister
- Beppo Brem as Billy Blake
- Rolf Wernicke as Reporter
- Edwin Jürgensen as Empfangschef
- Erwin Biegel as Kellner im Café
- Hubert von Meyerinck as Hotelgast
- Annemarie Korff as Dr. Thoms Sekretärin
- Eva Sommer as Backfisch im Hotel
- F.W. Schröder-Schrom as Professor der Jury
- Charlotte Schultz as Portiersfrau

== Bibliography ==
- Bock, Hans-Michael; Bergfelder, Tim, eds. (2009). The Concise Cinegraph: Encyclopaedia of German Cinema. New York: Berghahn Books. ISBN 978-1-57181-655-9.
- Klaus, Ulrich J. Deutsche Tonfilme: Jahrgang 1938. Klaus-Archiv, 1988.
- Rentschler, Eric (1996). The Ministry of Illusion: Nazi Cinema and Its Afterlife. Cambridge, Mass: Harvard University Press. ISBN 978-0-674-57640-7.
