= Downfall (1923 film) =

1923 film

- Danish poster
- Directed by: Ludwig Wolff
- Written by: Ludwig Wolff
- Produced by: Asta Nielsen
- Starring: Asta Nielsen; Gregori Chmara; Charlotte Schultz
- Cinematography: Axel Graatkjær; Georg Krause
- Production company: Art-Film
- Release date: 17 May 1923
- Running time: 106 minutes
- Country: Germany
- Languages: Silent; German intertitles

Downfall (German: Der Absturz) is a 1923 German silent film directed by Ludwig Wolff and starring Asta Nielsen, Gregori Chmara and Charlotte Schultz. The film was produced by Nielsen's own production company. The sets were designed by the art director Heinrich Beisenherz. It premiered in Düsseldorf and had its Berlin premiere at the Marmorhaus. The film survives but is missing its first reel.

== Plot ==
Kaja Falk is a successful and admired operetta star, who has been through a lot in her life: The man she loves has to pay for a murder Kaja is suspected to have committed. He accepts the punishment and is sent to jail for ten years. Full of gratitude, Kaja promises her love to stay faithful and wait for him to return. In the following years, he dreams of her every night. In his dreams, she is the young, admirable woman, for whom he took his prison sentence. In reality, the ten years of his absence were not kind to Kaja. When he finally returns, Kaja has aged a lot and is ravaged by disease. Out of prison, he waits for Kaja, who apparently did not come looking for him. But Kaja is there - he just did not recognize the old woman, who wanted to welcome her great love. Shocked and struck by grief, Kaja collapses.

== Cast ==
- Asta Nielsen as Kaja Falk
- Gregori Chmara as Peter Karsten
- Charlotte Schultz as Henrike Thomsen
- Adele Sandrock as Mutter Karsten
- Albert Bozenhard as Frank Lorris
- Hans Wassmann as Besucher
- Ivan Bulatov as Graf Lamotte
- Ida Wogau as Kajas Kammerfrau
- Arnold Korff

== Bibliography ==
- Hans-Michael Bock and Tim Bergfelder. The Concise Cinegraph: An Encyclopedia of German Cinema. Berghahn Books.
