= Philipp Lothar Mayring =

German screenwriter and film director

- Born: 19 September 1879; Würzburg, Bavaria; German Empire
- Died: 6 July 1948 (aged 68); Leipzig, Saxony; Soviet occupation zone in Germany
- Occupations: Film actor Screenwriter; Film director

Philipp Lothar Mayring (19 September 1879 – 6 July 1948) was a German screenwriter, actor and film director. He worked on the screenplays for over seventy films, and directed another twelve.

== Selected filmography ==
=== Screenwriter ===
- Love's Carnival (1930)
- My Wife, the Impostor (1931)
- The Upset Plan (1932)
- The White Demon (1932)
- Narcotics (1932)
- The Black Hussar (1932)
- Spoiling the Game (1932)
- Things Are Getting Better Already (1932)
- A Mad Idea (1932)
- When Love Sets the Fashion (1932)
- The Oil Sharks (1933)
- Young Dessau's Great Love (1933)
- Invisible Opponent (1933)
- Today Is the Day (1933)
- Decoy (1934)
- The Girlfriend of a Big Man (1934)
- Hubertus Castle (1934)
- The Higher Command (1935)
- The Man with the Paw (1935)
- Fresh Wind from Canada (1935)
- Last Stop (1935)
- One Too Many on Board (1935)
- The Girl from the Marsh Croft (1935)
- The Devil in the Bottle (1935)
- Harvest (1936)
- Thank You, Madame (1936)
- Love's Awakening (1936)
- Tango Notturno (1937)
- Patriots (1937)
- Mother Song (1937)
- Andalusian Nights (1938)
- The Secret Lie (1938)
- Red Orchids (1938)
- Secret Code LB 17 (1938)
- The Night of Decision (1938)
- The Roundabouts of Handsome Karl (1938)
- Uproar in Damascus (1939)
- Target in the Clouds (1939)
- Escape in the Dark (1939)
- Alarm at Station III (1939)
- Maria Ilona (1939)
- The Three Codonas (1940)
- Sky Hounds (1942)

=== Director ===
- The Stolen Face (1930)
- The Battle of Bademunde (1931)
- A Beautiful Day (1944)

=== Actor ===
- Sklaven der Rache (1921)
- Viennese Nights (1930)
- The Dance Goes On (1930)
- Demon of the Sea (1931)
- Alarm at Station III (1939)

== Bibliography ==
- Richards, Jeffrey. Visions of Yesterday. Routledge, 1973.
