= The Merciful Lie =

- Directed by: Werner Klingler
- Written by: Curt J. Braun; Werner Klingler; Günter Kulemeyer
- Produced by: Erich Palme
- Starring: Hilde Krahl; Elisabeth Flickenschildt; Ernst von Klipstein
- Cinematography: Karl Puth
- Edited by: Ella Ensink
- Music by: Hans Carste
- Production company: Euphono-Film
- Distributed by: Tobis Film
- Release date: 17 August 1939
- Running time: 87 minutes
- Country: Germany
- Language: German

The Merciful Lie (German: Die barmherzige Lüge) is a 1939 German drama film directed by Werner Klingler and starring Hilde Krahl, Elisabeth Flickenschildt and Ernst von Klipstein. It was shot at the Johannisthal Studios in Berlin and on location in Bremen. The film's sets were designed by the art directors Karl Böhm and Erich Czerwonski.

== Synopsis ==
In a frontier town on the border between Manchuria and Mongolia Anja, the niece of the owner of a rough local entertainment venue waits for the return of her lover Doctor Thomas Clausen with whom she has had a child. Clausen is part of an expedition planning to explore into the wild lands on the Soviet side of the border. To Anja's dismay, however, he returns with a new wife.

When the new wife dies of food poisoning and Clausen is away on his expedition, Anja goes to Bremen to stay with his wealthy family and masquerades as his wife. They welcome her as she has a child who will carry on the family line.

== Cast ==
- Hilde Krahl as Anja Hoster
- Elisabeth Flickenschildt as Vera Holster
- Ernst von Klipstein as Dr.Thomas Clausen
- Lieselott Klingler as Maria, sua Moglie
- Heinrich Schroth as Berthold Clausen
- Agnes Windeck as Margherita
- Otto Gebühr as Dr. Henrici
- Paul Dahlke as Jean Goban
- Gertrud Meyen as Gerda Biehler, Sekretärin
- Jaspar von Oertzen as Felix
- Olga Limburg as Emilie Wallner
- Ernst Albert Schaach as Robert, Diener
- Ekkehard Stibbe as Thomas, Anjas Sohn
- Lucie Euler as Kinderfrau bei Anja
- Nien Soen Ling as Diener
- Thea Zien as Olga, Barmädchen
- Max Paetz as Mongole im Hotel
- Eugen von Bongardt as Polizeioffizier
- Franz Arzdorf as 1. Kriminalkommissar
- Georg A. Profé as 2. Kriminalkommissar
- Charly Berger as 1. Kriminalbeamter
- Albert Probeck as 2. Kriminalbeamter
- Erik Radolf as Kriminalrat
- Eduard von Winterstein as Professor Neumann
- Willi Sande-Meyer as Dr. Fischer, Lawyer
- Ilse Trautschold as Mädchen bei Clausen
- Fred Goebel as Chauffeur bei Clausen
- Curt Cappi as Portier im Krankenhaus
- Hanns Waschatko as Deutscher Konsul
- Else Lüders as Bridgepartnerin von Frau Wallner
- Else Valery as Bridgepartnerin von Frau Wallner

== Bibliography ==
- Heins, Laura. Nazi Film Melodrama. University of Illinois Press, 2013.
- Waldman, Harry. Nazi Films in America, 1933–1942. McFarland, 2008.
