= Covered Tracks =

1938 film

- Directed by: Veit Harlan
- Written by: Veit Harlan; Felix Lützkendorf; Hans Rothe; Thea von Harbou
- Produced by: Helmut Eweler; Franz Tappers
- Starring: Kristina Söderbaum; Philip Dorn; Charlotte Schultz
- Cinematography: Bruno Mondi
- Edited by: Marianne Behr
- Music by: Hans-Otto Borgmann
- Production company: Majestic-Film
- Distributed by: Tobis Film
- Release date: 26 August 1938
- Running time: 81 minutes
- Country: Germany
- Language: German

Covered Tracks (German: Verwehte Spuren) is a 1938 German historical drama film directed by Veit Harlan and starring Kristina Söderbaum, Philip Dorn, and Charlotte Schultz. It was shot at the EFA Studios in Berlin's Halensee and the Bavaria Studios in Munich with location shooting taking place in both cities as well as in Paris. The film's sets were designed by the art directors Karl Haacker and Hermann Warm. It premiered at the Venice Film Festival.

== Plot summary ==
A young woman named Séraphine checks her ailing mother into a Parisian hotel, having arrived to attend the 1867 International Exposition. When she comes back to the hotel with her mother's medication, she finds her room vacant and none of the staff remembers ever seeing her or her mother checking into the hotel. Séraphine then embarks on a quest to uncover the mystery of her mother's disappearance and prove her own sanity.

== Cast ==
- Kristina Söderbaum as Séraphine Lawrence
- Philip Dorn as Dr. Fernand Morot
- Charlotte Schultz as Madeleine Lawrence, Séraphines Mutter
- Friedrich Kayßler as Polizeipräfekt von Paris
- Paul Dahlke as Henry Poquet, Boulevardschriftsteller
- Heinrich Schroth as Graf Duval, Präsident des Weltaussstellungskomitees
- Hans Halden as Fragonard, Polizeikommissar
- Josef Sieber as Maurice, Hausdiener
- Leo Peukert as Dubois, Polizeisekretär
- Edith Meinhard as Jeanette, Stubenmädchen
- Milena von Eckhardt as Colette, Maurices Freundin
- Clemens Hasse as Gaston, Hausdiener
- Ernst Rotmund as Nachtportier
- Paul Bildt as Attaché an der englischen Botschaft
- Valy Arnheim as Chefredakteur des 'Figaro'
- Hans Stiebner as Pigeon, Druckereibesitzer
- Klaus Detlef Sierck as Armand, Hotelpage
- Jakob Tiedtke as Dompierre, Hotelier
- Max Wilmsen as Tagesportier
- Hermann Wagner as Gustave, Musikstudent
- Hildegard Imhof as Mme. Printemps
- Elis. Botz as Mme. Chaumette
- Hans Hemes as Sekretär an der englischen Botschaft
- Hilla Höfer as Sekretärin Poquets
- Heinz Appel
- Georg Völkel as Colettes Tänzer beim Hausball
- Heinrich Dugall as Malerlehrling
- Charles Willy Kayser as Pariser Hotelportier
- Gerti Ober as Empfangsmädchen bei Dr. Morot
- Bruno Klockmann as Patient bei Dr. Morot
- Hansjakob Gröblinghoff as Page im Hotel De la Russie
- Ewald Wenck
- Heinrich Vogt as Ballhausdirektor

== See also ==
- Midnight Warning (1932)
- The Lady Vanishes (1938)
- So Long at the Fair (1950)
- Dangerous Crossing (1953)
- Flightplan (2005)
- Abandoned (2010)

== Bibliography ==
- Heins, Laura Julia (2013). Nazi Film Melodrama. Urbana: University of Illinois Press. ISBN 978-0-252-09502-3.
- Noack, Frank. Veit Harlan: The Life and Work of a Nazi Filmmaker. University Press of Kentucky, 2016.
- Schiweck, Ingo & Toonen, Hans. Maharadscha, Tschetnik, Kriegsheimkehrer: der Schauspieler Frits van Dongen oder Philip Dorn. Der Andere Verlag, 2003.
