= Revolt in the Batchelor's House =

1929 film directed by Manfred Noa

- Directed by: Manfred Noa
- Written by: Victor Abel; Bobby E. Lüthge
- Starring: Sig Arno; Kurt Gerron; Trude Hesterberg
- Cinematography: Willy Hameister
- Music by: Werner Schmidt-Boelcke
- Production company: Ama-Film
- Distributed by: Ama-Film
- Release date: 1 July 1929
- Running time: 116 minutes
- Country: Germany
- Languages: Silent; German intertitles

Revolt in the Batchelor's House (German: Aufruhr im Junggesellenheim) is a 1929 German silent comedy film directed by Manfred Noa and starring Sig Arno, Kurt Gerron and Trude Hesterberg. It was shot at the Halensee Studios in Berlin. The film's sets were designed by the art director Max Heilbronner. It was one of two films starring Arno and Gerron in their characters of 'Beef' and 'Steak' in an effort to create a German equivalent to Laurel and Hardy.

== Cast ==
- Sig Arno as Beef
- Kurt Gerron as Steak
- Trude Hesterberg as Die lustige Witwe
- Käthe von Nagy as Käthe
- Adele Sandrock as Tante Adele
- Albert Paulig as Onkel Theobald
- Yvette Darnys as Die lustige Ehefrau
- Angelo Ferrari as Ihr Gatte

== See also ==
- We Stick Together Through Thick and Thin (1929)

== Bibliography ==
- Bock, Hans-Michael & Bergfelder, Tim. The Concise Cinegraph: Encyclopaedia of German Cinema. Berghahn Books, 2009.
- Prawer, S.S. Between Two Worlds: The Jewish Presence in German and Austrian Film, 1910-1933. Berghahn Books, 2005.
