= Ernst von Klipstein =

German actor

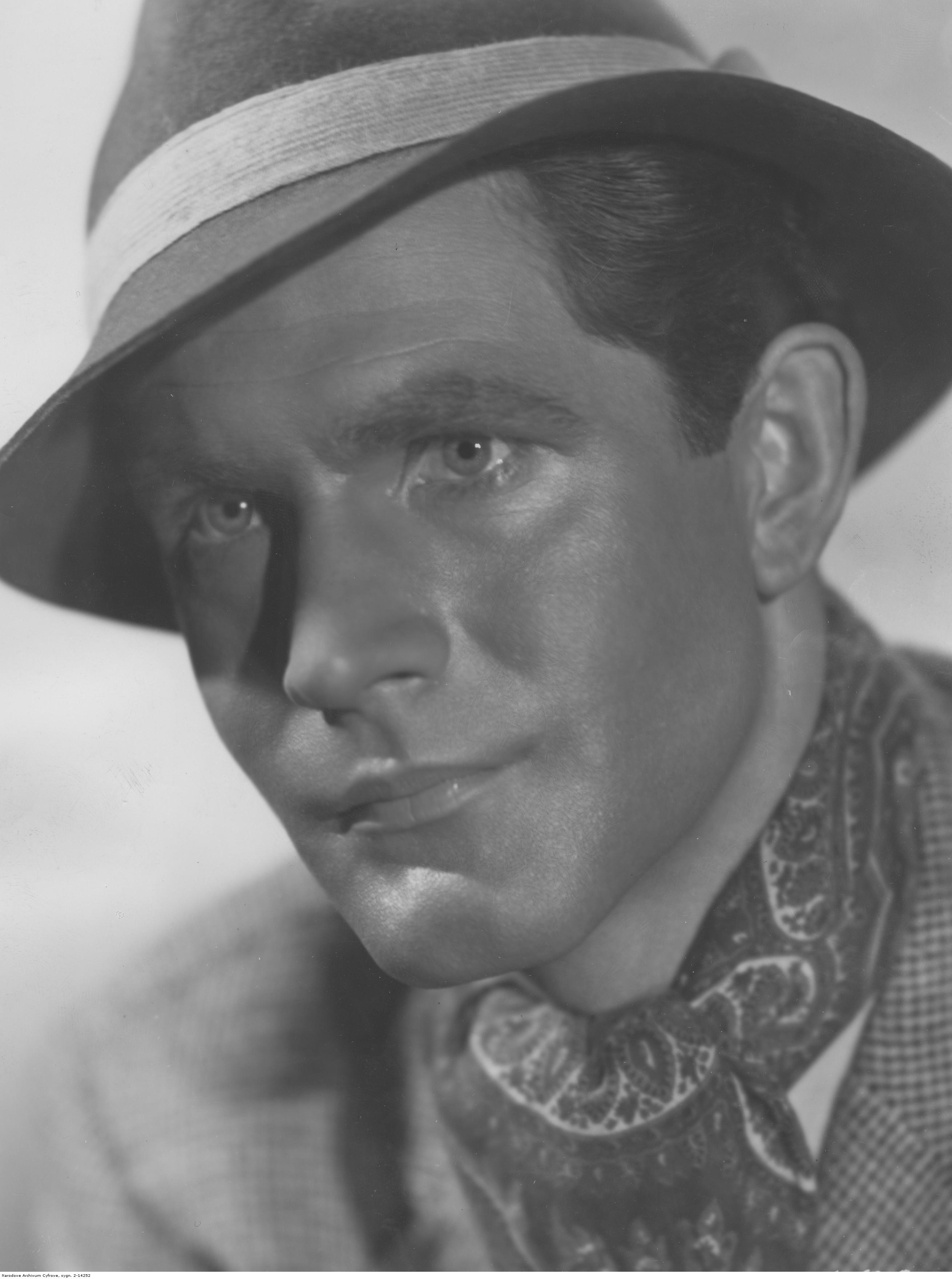
- Born: 3 February 1908; Posen, Prussia, German Empire
- Died: 22 November 1993 (aged 85)
- Occupations: Film actor Television actor

Ernst von Klipstein (3 February 1908 – 22 November 1993) was a German film and television actor. von Klipstein became a prominent actor during the Nazi era, appearing in a large number of action films.

== Partial filmography ==
- Uproar in Damascus (1939) - Gefreiter von Elmendonck
- The Governor (1939) - Leutnant Robert Runeberg
- Escape in the Dark (1939) - Chemiker Dr. Paul Gildemeister
- The Merciful Lie (1939) - Dr.Thomas Clausen
- Midsummer Night's Fire (1939) - Georg
- Legion Condor (1939)
- The Three Codonas (1940) - Lalo Codona
- Blutsbrüderschaft (1941) - Fliegerleutnant Jochen Wendler
- Unser kleiner Junge (1941) - Janke
- Stukas (1941) - Oberleutnant "Patzer" von Bomberg
- Alarmstufe V (1941) - Richard Haller
- Wedding in Barenhof (1942) - Ulanenoffizier Lothar von Pütz
- Voice of the Heart (1942) - Paul Ohlsen
- 5 June (1942) - Oberleutnant Lebsten
- The Second Shot (1943) - Franz von Gerlach
- The Crew of the Dora (1943) - Hauptmann Kurt Gillhausen
- Das schwarze Schaf (1944)
- Summer Nights (1944) - Kuno
- Aufruhr der Herzen (1944)
- Schicksal am Strom (1944) - Jürg Petersen, Steuermann
- Das alte Lied (1945) - Graf Erwin Haldem
- Heidesommer (1945) - Bernhard
- Thank You, I'm Fine (1948) - Tierarzt Dokter Höflin
- Trouble Backstairs (1949) - Assessor Dr. Erich Horn
- Die drei Dorfheiligen (1949) - Lehrer
- Erzieherin gesucht (1950) - Achim Terbrügge
- Ripening Youth (1955) - Studienrat Baumbauer
- The Barrings (1955) - Dr. Bremer
- Two Blue Eyes (1955) - Feigl, Ingenieur
- In Hamburg When the Nights Are Long (1956)
- Skandal um Dr. Vlimmen (1956) - Dr. Treeborg
- Nothing But Blondes (1957) - Doctor
- Madeleine und der Legionär (1958)
- Stalingrad: Dogs, Do You Want to Live Forever? (1959) - Ein General
- The Stuff That Dreams Are Made Of (1972) - Thomas Hem

== Bibliography ==
- Baird, Jay W. To Die for Germany: Heroes in the Nazi Pantheon. Indiana University Press, 1990.
