= Summer Nights (1944 film) =

1944 film

- Directed by: Karl Ritter
- Written by: Vera Bern; Gustav Kampendonk
- Produced by: Karl Ritter
- Starring: René Deltgen; Suse Graf; Ernst von Klipstein
- Cinematography: Ekkehard Kyrath
- Edited by: Margret Noell
- Music by: Winfried Zillig
- Production company: UFA
- Distributed by: Deutsche Filmvertriebs
- Release date: 26 June 1944
- Running time: 91 minutes
- Country: Germany
- Language: German

Summer Nights (German: Sommernächte) is a 1944 German comedy film directed by Karl Ritter and starring René Deltgen, Suse Graf and Ernst von Klipstein. Location shooting took place in East Prussia, particularly around the Masurian Lakes. It was shot at the National Studios in Berlin. The film's sets were designed by the art director Wilhelm Vorwerg.

== Cast ==
- René Deltgen as Dr. Thomas
- Suse Graf as Gabriele
- Ernst von Klipstein as Kuno
- Jutta von Alpen as Uschi Brosseit
- Franz Weber as Dunhus
- Charlotte Ritter as Ernestine
- Leopold von Ledebur as General A.D. Brosseit
- Erich Dunskus as Kalaut
- Karl Hannemann as Gemeindevorsteher
- Dorothea Thiess as Pauline
- Irmgard Thielke as Magd

== Bibliography ==
- Kreimeier, Klaus. The Ufa Story: A History of Germany's Greatest Film Company, 1918-1945. University of California Press, 1999.
- Rentschler, Eric. The Ministry of Illusion: Nazi Cinema and Its Afterlife. Harvard University Press, 1996.
