= The Last Four on Santa Cruz =

1936 film

- Directed by: Werner Klingler
- Written by: Josef Maria Frank (novel); Werner Klingler; Alois Johannes Lippl
- Produced by: Karl Ritter
- Starring: Hermann Speelmans; Irene von Meyendorff; Valéry Inkijinoff
- Cinematography: Hans Beierlein; Konstantin Irmen-Tschet; Erich Schmidtke
- Edited by: Gottfried Ritter; Eduard von Borsody
- Music by: Walter Gronostay
- Production company: UFA
- Distributed by: UFA
- Release date: 11 March 1936
- Country: Germany
- Language: German

The Last Four on Santa Cruz (German: Die letzten Vier von Santa Cruz) is a 1936 German drama film directed by Werner Klingler and starring Hermann Speelmans, Irene von Meyendorff and Valéry Inkijinoff. The film was shot at the Babelsberg Studios in Berlin and on location in the Canary Islands.

== Cast ==
- Hermann Speelmans as Kapitän Pieter Streuvels
- Irene von Meyendorff as Madeleine - seine Braut
- Valéry Inkijinoff as Reeder Alexis Aika
- Françoise Rosay as Nadja Danouw
- Erich Ponto as Alexander Ghazaroff
- Josef Sieber as Jack
- Max Schreck as William
- Beppo Brem as Erik
- Andrews Engelmann as Cairos
- Harald Gloth as Hein
- Walter Holten as Sklavenhalter Malherbes
- Ludwig Andersen as Dunard
- Max Harry Ernst as Ein Gast

== Bibliography ==
- Parish, James Robert (1977). Film Actors Guide: Western Europe. Scarecrow Press. ISBN 978-0-8108-1044-0.
