= Escape in the Dark =

1939 film directed by Arthur Maria Rabenalt

- German: Flucht ins Dunkel
- Directed by: Arthur Maria Rabenalt
- Written by: Carl Unselt (novel); Philipp Lothar Mayring
- Produced by: Otto Lehmann
- Starring: Hertha Feiler; Joachim Gottschalk; Ernst von Klipstein
- Cinematography: Oskar Schnirch
- Edited by: Helmuth Schönnenbeck
- Music by: Hans-Martin Majewski
- Production company: Terra Film
- Distributed by: Terra Film
- Release date: 8 August 1939
- Running time: 86 minutes
- Country: Germany
- Language: German

Escape in the Dark or Flight into Darkness (German: Flucht ins Dunkel) is a 1939 German crime film directed by Arthur Maria Rabenalt and starring Hertha Feiler, Joachim Gottschalk and Ernst von Klipstein.

It was made at the Babelsberg Studios outside Berlin. The film's sets were designed by the art director Willi Herrmann.

The film is about two veterans of the First World War employed in a chemistry works laboratory.

== Cast ==
- Hertha Feiler as Barbara Wrede
- Joachim Gottschalk as Chemiker Engelbrecht
- Ernst von Klipstein as Chemiker Dr. Paul Gildemeister
- Paul Hoffmann as Barbaras Bruder Dr. Wrede
- Siegfried Schürenberg as Werkslaborant Dr. Marlow
- Walter Werner as Hedemeier
- Gerhard Dammann as Julius Hückebusch
- Gerhard Bienert as Müller
- Theo Shall as René Laroche
- Ingolf Kuntze as Dr. Schmidtmann
- Annemarie Sauerwein as Madelaine Laroche
- Fritz Böttger as Nachtlokalbesitzer
- Hilla Höfer as Tänzerin Rita
- Franz Arzdorf as Polizeipräsident
- Günther Ballier as Deutscher Adjutant
- Aribert Grimmer
- Lothar Glathe
- Käthe Jöken-König
- Josef Kamper
- Charlie Kracker
- Richard Ludwig
- Hermann Mayer-Falkow
- Armin Münch
- Werner Pledath
- Ernst Albert Schaach
- André Saint-Germain
- Ludwig Schmid-Wildy
- Werner Schott
- Theodor Thony
- Margot Thilo

== Bibliography ==
- Davidson, John; Hake, Sabine (2009). Framing the Fifties: Cinema in a Divided Germany. Berghahn Books. ISBN 978-1-84545-536-1.
