= The Coral Princess =

1937 film

- Directed by: Victor Janson
- Written by: Stevo Kluic (novel); Harald G. Petersson
- Produced by: Ludwig Behrends
- Starring: Iván Petrovich; Hilde Sessak; Ita Rina
- Cinematography: Herbert Körner
- Edited by: Wolfgang Becker
- Music by: Josip Slavenski; Ivo Tijardovic
- Production company: Tobis Film
- Distributed by: Tobis Film
- Release date: 29 October 1937
- Running time: 76 minutes
- Countries: Germany; Yugoslavia
- Language: German

The Coral Princess (German: Die Korallenprinzessin or alternatively An der schönen Adria) is a 1937 German-Yugoslav comedy film directed by Victor Janson, starring Iván Petrovich, Hilde Sessak and Ita Rina.

The film's sets were designed by the art directors Robert A. Dietrich and Artur Günther. Location shooting took place on the Adriatic coast of Croatia.

== Cast ==
- Iván Petrovich as Marko Vukowitsch, Fliegeroffizier
- Hilde Sessak as Didi Orsich
- Ita Rina as Anka, Vukowitsch' Pflegetochter
- Wilhelm König as Mate / ein Fischer / Ankas Velobter
- Herta Worell as Thea, Nikos Schwester
- Carl-Heinz Schroth as Niko, Inhaber einer Schmuckfabrik
- Olga Limburg as Kapitän Orsichs Frau
- Walter Steinbeck as Kapitän Orsich, Didis Onkel
- Eduard von Winterstein as Vukowitsch, Markos Vater
- Heinz Piper as Leutnant Küken
- Heinrich Schroth as Dr. Milich, der Dorfarzt
- Peter Busse as Ein Korallenfischer
- Hellmuth Passarge as Ein Korallenfischer
- Georg H. Schnell as Ein Fliegerkommandant
- Günther Ballier as Ein Buchhalter in Nikos Fabrik
- Hans Ballmann as Tenor
- Charly Berger as Ein Konferenzteilnehmer
- Hildegard Busse as Die Zofe
- Curt Cappi as Der Diener bei Orsich
- Alfred Karen as Ein Konferenzteilnehmer
- Edith Meinel as Ein Gast bei Didis Geburtstagsfeier
- Hermann Pfeiffer as Ein Buchhalter in Nikos Fabrik
- Kurt Wieschala as Kamerad Markos, Fliegeroffizier

== Bibliography ==
- Bock, Hans-Michael; Bergfelder, Tim, eds. (2009). The Concise Cinegraph: Encyclopaedia of German Cinema. New York: Berghahn Books. ISBN 978-1-57181-655-9.
