= Joachim Gottschalk =

German actor

- Born: 10 April 1904; Calau, Germany
- Died: 6 November 1941 (aged 37); Berlin, Germany
- Spouse: Meta Wolff (m. 1931–1941)
- Children: 1

Joachim Gottschalk (10 April 1904 – 6 November 1941) was a German stage and film actor during the late 1930s, a romantic lead in the style of Leslie Howard.

== Life and work ==
Gottschalk, the son of a physician, was born in the small town of Calau, in the Prussian province of Brandenburg. He attended the Gymnasium in Cottbus and from 1924 worked for four years on seagoing vessels. He later began a theatrical education in Cottbus and Berlin. During an engagement in Stuttgart, he met the Jewish actress Meta Wolff (1902–1941). They married on 3 May 1930 in Halberstadt, shortly before Hitler came to power. They had a son, Michael, who was born in February 1933.

After the Nazi Machtergreifung in 1933, Propaganda Minister Joseph Goebbels promoted the establishment of the Reichskulturkammer institution. Actors were required to apply for membership in the Theaterkammer on presentation of an "Aryan certificate" which meant a prohibition (Berufsverbot) to Gottschalk's wife. The couple managed to avoid the antisemitic Nuremberg Laws and rising tide of antisemitic violence in Nazi Germany. From 1934 Gottschalk performed at the Schauspielhaus Frankfurt and in 1938 joined the Volksbühne ensemble in Berlin. In the same year, he began his film career starring in the romance You and I directed by Wolfgang Liebeneiner, side by side with the popular German actress Brigitte Horney.

While World War II began with the German invasion of Poland in 1939, Gottschalk and Horney appeared as a "dream couple" in a string of successful movies. Gottschalk took his Jewish wife to a social function and introduced her to some of the prominent Nazis who were present. Although the Nazis were charmed, Goebbels (a virulent antisemite) learned about this incident, and decreed that Gottschalk would be required to separate from his Jewish wife. When Gottschalk refused, Goebbels ordered Gottschalk's wife and child transported to the Theresienstadt concentration camp. The minister's Special Representative Hans Hinkel insisted on the divorce and Gottschalk was threatened to play no further roles. Gottschalk insisted on accompanying Meta and Michael to Theresienstadt, but Goebbels ordered Gottschalk inducted into the German Army, the Wehrmacht.

== Death and legacy ==
On 6 November 1941, minutes before the expected arrival of the Gestapo at their house in Berlin-Grunewald, Gottschalk and his wife committed suicide by gas poisoning after sedating their son, who died with them. They are buried at the Stahnsdorf South-Western Cemetery near Berlin. Though warned by Minister Goebbels, Brigitte Horney and Wolfgang Liebeneiner, as well as other artists like Gustav Knuth, Hans Brausewetter, Werner Hinz, and Ruth Hellberg attended the funeral.

Goebbels ordered no further mentions of Gottschalk in the German newspapers, but word got out anyway and millions of German women mourned his death. Because of Nazi censorship, most of his devoted fans did not learn the awful circumstances of his death until after the war. In 1947 Kurt Maetzig directed the DEFA melodrama Marriage in the Shadows after a novella by Hans Schweikart evoking the couple's fate. The 2002 drama Times Like These written by John O'Keefe is based on their individual tragedy.

== Filmography ==
- You and I (1938), with Brigitte Horney
- Uproar in Damascus (1939), with Brigitte Horney
- A Woman Like You (1939), with Brigitte Horney
- Escape in the Dark (1939), directed by Arthur Maria Rabenalt; was placed on in Catalogue of Forbidden German Feature and Short Film Productions after World War II
- Ein Leben Lang (1940)
- The Girl from Fano (1941), with Brigitte Horney
- The Swedish Nightingale (1941), with Ilse Werner
