= The Grand Duke's Finances (1934 film) =

1934 film

- Directed by: Gustaf Gründgens
- Written by: Hans Rameau; Gustaf Gründgens
- Based on: The Grand Duke's Finances by Frank Heller
- Produced by: Guido Bagier
- Starring: Viktor de Kowa; Hilde Weissner; Heinz Rühmann
- Cinematography: Ewald Daub
- Edited by: W.L. Bagier; Carl Forcht
- Music by: Theo Mackeben
- Production company: Tofa-Film
- Distributed by: Neue Deutsch Lichtspiel-Syndikat Verleih
- Release date: 10 January 1934
- Running time: 96 minutes
- Country: Germany
- Language: German

The Grand Duke's Finances (German: Die Finanzen des Großherzogs) is a 1934 German comedy film directed by Gustaf Gründgens and starring Viktor de Kowa, Hilde Weissner and Heinz Rühmann. It is a remake of the 1924 silent film of the same name by F. W. Murnau. The film was made at the Staaken Studios in Berlin while location shooting took place in Madeira and Tenerife. The film's sets were designed by the art director Franz Schroedter.

== Plot ==
Grand Duke Ramon, ruler of Abacco, is suffering from financial difficulties. He has already had to sell almost all his possessions. His biggest financier and creditor, the shady crook Mircovich, is already devising a devious plan to overthrow the duke, because he wants to rule the country himself.

However, when the American Bekker discovers underground sulfur deposits, the situation changes because he offers the duke a large sum in order to be able to mine the sulphur. However, the Duke refuses to accept the purchase offer. A short time later he has to resign because he no longer has any financial means. The situation is saved when the Duke marries the rich Russian Grand Duchess Diana.

== Cast ==
- Viktor de Kowa as Großherzog
- Hilde Weissner as Diana
- Paul Henckels as Paqueno
- Heinz Rühmann as Pelotard
- Maria Loja as Conchita
- Hans Stiebner as Luis, ihr Mann
- Fritz Alberti as Großfürst Cyrill
- Theo Lingen as Fürst Potemkin
- Willi Schur as Kapitän Malossol
- Wolfgang von Schwindt as Sergeant Quesada
- Ernst Rotmund as Mircovich
- Vilma Bekendorf as Zofe bei Diana
- Herbert Paulmüller
- Friedrich Honna
- Kurt Hoellger
- Genia Nikolaieva
- Bert Schmidt-Moris as Straßenjunge
- Ossy Kratz-Corell as Korporal in der Leibwache des Großherzogs
- Elisabeth von Ruets

== Bibliography ==
- O'Brien, Mary-Elizabeth (2004). Nazi Cinema as Enchantment: The Politics of Entertainment in the Third Reich. Rochester, NY: Camden House. ISBN 978-1-57113-283-3.
