= Nora's Ark =

1948 film

- Directed by: Werner Klingler
- Written by: Harald G. Petersson
- Produced by: Walter Koppel
- Starring: Willy Maertens; Claus Hofer; Harry Meyen
- Cinematography: Eugen Klagemann
- Edited by: Klaus Dudenhöfer
- Music by: Willi Kollo
- Production company: Real Film
- Distributed by: Herzog Film
- Release date: 6 February 1948
- Running time: 82 minutes
- Country: Germany
- Language: German

Nora's Ark (German: Arche Nora) is a 1948 German comedy-drama film directed by Werner Klingler that stars Willy Maertens, Claus Hofer and Harry Meyen. It is about a young couple who go to live on a derelict boat because they lack a home. It was produced by Real Films and shot at the Wandsbek Studios in Hamburg in the British Zone of Occupation. The film's sets were designed by art director Herbert Kirchhoff.

== Cast ==
- Willy Maertens as Willi Lüdecke
- Claus Hofer as Klaus Schriewer
- Harry Meyen as Peter Stoll
- Edith Schneider as Nora Wendler
- Peter Schütte as Jochen Wendler
- Johannes Billiam as Monteur
- Hans Billian
- Karl Kramer as Besitzer des Autofriedhofes
- Lieselotte Lütje as Sekretärin
- Marga Maasberg as Frau Jansen
- Kurt Meister as Radtke
- Ludwig Röger as Ein dicker Mann
- Sylvia Schwarz as Kind
- Willi Schweisguth as Arzt

== Bibliography ==
- Davidson, John & Hake, Sabine. Framing the Fifties: Cinema in a Divided Germany. Berghahn Books, 2007.
