= Hilde Weissner =

German actress (1909–1987)

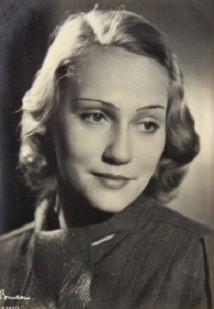
- Hilde Weissner, c. 1928
- Born: 3 July 1909; Stettin, German Empire
- Died: 30 May 1987 (aged 77); Braunau am Inn, Austria
- Occupation: actress

Hilde Weissner (3 July 1909 – 30 May 1987) was a German actress.

== Life and career ==
Born on 3 July 1909 in Stettin, Germany (in what is, today, Szczecin, Poland), Hilde Weissner made her theatrical acting debut at the Schiller-Theatre in Hamburg-Altona in 1929, and then began her film career in 1934. She died on 30 May 1987 in Braunau am Inn, Braunau am Inn Bezirk, Upper Austria, and was laid to rest at the Ohlsdorfer Friedhof Cemetery in Ohlsdorf, Hamburg, Germany.

== Selected filmography ==
- The Grand Duke's Finances (1934)
- Decoy (1934)
- Pappi (1934)
- What Am I Without You (1934)
- The Man with the Paw (1935)
- The Castle in Flanders (1936)
- Back in the Country (1936)
- The Dreamer (1936)
- The Man Who Was Sherlock Holmes (1937)
- Ball at the Metropol (1937)
- The Muzzle (1938)
- Secret Code LB 17 (1938)
- All Lies (1938)
- Freight from Baltimore (1938)
- The Impossible Mister Pitt (1938)
- The Golden Mask (1939)
- Marriage in Small Doses (1939)
- A Man Astray (1940)
- Beloved Augustin (1940)
- Trenck the Pandur (1940)
- Diesel (1942)
- Melody of a Great City (1943)
- Ein Blick zurück (1944)
- The Noltenius Brothers (1945)
- Tromba (1949)
- The Perfect Couple (1954)
- Beloved Enemy (1955)
- Friederike von Barring (1956)
- Die Nibelungen (1966)
- Something for Everyone (1970)
- Just a Gigolo (1978)
