= We Stick Together Through Thick and Thin =

1929 film

- Directed by: Herbert Nossen
- Written by: Hans Kahan
- Starring: Sig Arno; Kurt Gerron; Ernst Karchow; Vera Schmiterlöw
- Cinematography: Willy Hameister
- Production company: Ama-Film
- Release date: 16 September 1929
- Running time: 90 minutes
- Country: Germany
- Languages: Silent; German intertitles

We Stick Together Through Thick and Thin (German: Wir halten fest und treu zusammen) is a 1929 German silent comedy film directed by Herbert Nossen and starring Sig Arno, Kurt Gerron and Ernst Karchow. It was one of two films starring Arno and Gerron in their characters of 'Beef' and 'Steak' in an effort to create a German equivalent to Laurel and Hardy. It premiered at the Marmorhaus in Berlin.

== Cast ==
- Sig Arno as Beef
- Kurt Gerron as Steak
- Ernst Karchow as Theodor Klabautermann
- Vera Schmiterlöw as Kitty, Tochter
- Evi Eva as Köchin
- Antonie Jaeckel as Freifrau von Gotha, Heiratsvermittlerin
- Lotte Roman as Stubenmädchen
- Edith Meller as Carola Triller
- Claire Claery
- Carl Geppert as Assessor
- Ewald Wenck as Assessor
- Arnold Hasenclever as Teddy
- Max Grünberg as Justizrat Scharf
- Otto Hoppe as Geschäftsführer des Restaurants Newa-Grill

== See also ==
- Revolt in the Batchelor's House (1929)

== Bibliography ==
- Prawer, S.S. Between Two Worlds: The Jewish Presence in German and Austrian Film, 1910-1933. Berghahn Books, 2005.
