= Charlotte Schultz (actress) =

German actress

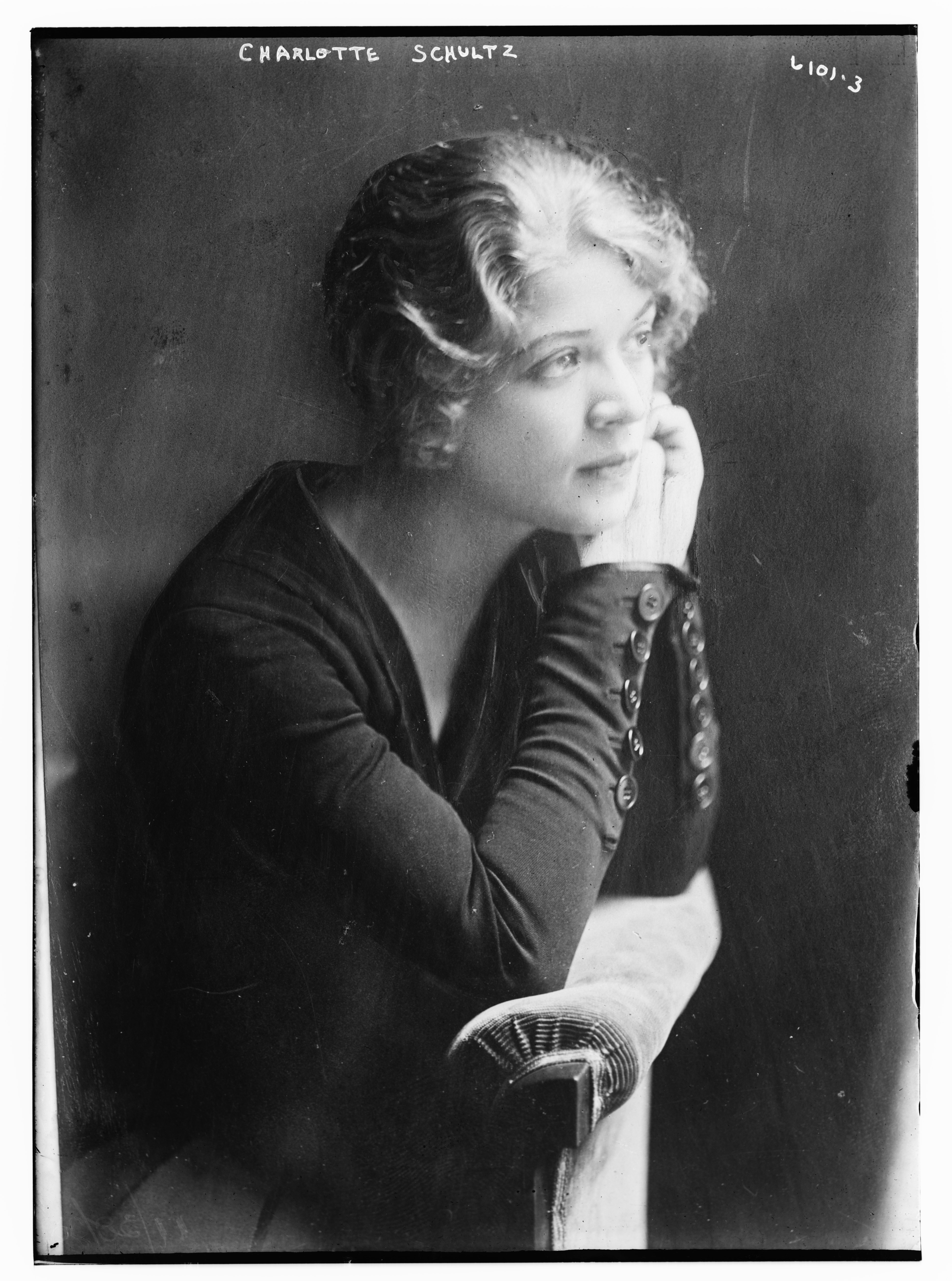
- Born: 21 September 1899; East Prussia, German Empire
- Died: 11 February 1946 (aged 46); Berlin, Allied-occupied Germany
- Occupation: Actress
- Years active: 1918-1946 (film)

Charlotte Schultz (1899–1946) was a German stage and film actress.

== Selected filmography ==
- Die Liebe des Van Royk (1918)
- Helmsman Holk (1920)
- The Eternal Curse (1921)
- Fridericus Rex (1922)
- Downfall (1923)
- Anna Favetti (1938)
- Covered Tracks (1938)
- A Woman Like You (1939)
- Robert Koch (1939)
- The Journey to Tilsit (1939)
- The Girl from Fano (1940)
- A Salzburg Comedy (1941)
- Her Other Self (1941)
- Wedding in Barenhof (1942)
- Between Heaven and Earth (1942)
- Circus Renz (1943)
- The Master Detective (1944)
- Jan und die Schwindlerin (1947)

== Bibliography ==
- Hardt, Ursula. From Caligari to California: Erich Pommer's life in the International Film Wars. Berghahn Books, 1996.
