= Werner Klingler =

German film director

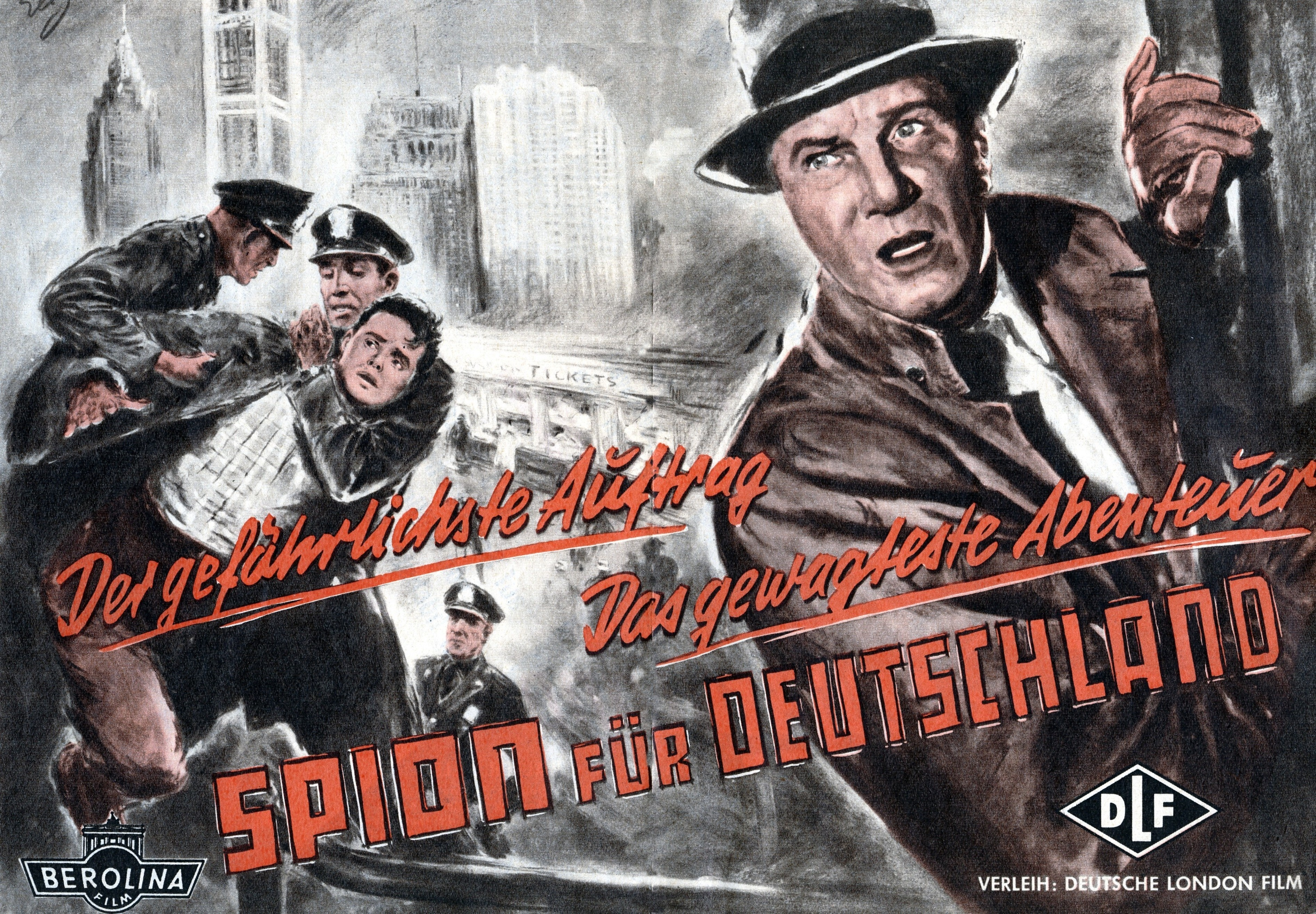
- Born: 23 October 1903; Stuttgart, German Empire
- Died: 23 June 1972 (aged 68); West Berlin, West Germany
- Occupations: Film director, actor
- Years active: 1929–1968

Karl Adolf Kurt Werner Klingler (23 October 1903 – 23 June 1972) was a German film director and actor. He directed 29 films between 1936 and 1968. He was born in Stuttgart and died in West Berlin, West Germany.

== Early life ==
Klingler acquired his first theatre experience in minor acting roles. He immigrated to the United States, where he played at a German-American theater in Milwaukee in 1925. Klingler starred in films, such as Howard Hughes' Hell's Angels and Wilhelm Dieterle's The Dance Goes On (a German-language version of Those Who Dance).

== Career ==
Klingler met Luis Trenker to film Mountains on Fire. Klingler was assistant director at SOS Eisberg (1933) and The Prodigal Son (1934 film). He directed The Last Four on Santa Cruz (1936). Klingler regressed to Germany. His new titles included Condottieri (1937 film), Love Letters from Engadin (1938), Die letzte Runde (1940), and Wetterleuchten um Barbara (1941). Klingler replaced the allegedly executed director, Herbert Selpin, for Titanic. After the epic film was banned, Klingler's Die Degenhardts (1944) was banned the following year. Klingler was unable to complete The Man in the Saddle due to the Battle of Berlin. His postwar credits include Raid (1947) and Nora's Ark (1948). He returned to Hollywood only to be rejected.

Klingler directed Aus dem Tagebuch eines Frauenarztes (1959) and Spy for Germany (1956).

Klingler released the film, Lebensborn (1961), about the Nazi Eugenics system. He filmed a version of Bryan Edgar Wallace's Death Packs a Suitcase under the title, The Secret of the Black Trunk. His last film was Street Acquaintances of St. Pauli (1968).

== Selected filmography ==
- The Dance Goes On (1930)
- The Last Four on Santa Cruz (1936)
- Home Guardsman Bruggler (1936)
- Condottieri (directed by Luis Trenker, 1937)
- Love Letters from Engadin (directed by Luis Trenker, 1938)
- The Merciful Lie (1939)
- Lightning Around Barbara (1941)
- Titanic (uncredited, 1943)
- The Degenhardts (1944)
- Anna Alt (1945)
- Raid (1947)
- Nora's Ark (1948)
- Spy for Germany (1956)
- Doctor Bertram (1957)
- Banktresor 713 (1957)
- Hoppla, jetzt kommt Eddie (1958)
- A Doctor of Conviction (1959)
- Lebensborn (1961)
- The Secret of the Black Trunk (1962)
- Das Testament des Dr. Mabuse (1962)
- Das Haus auf dem Hügel (1964)
- The Dirty Game (1965)
- Street Acquaintances of St. Pauli (1968)
