= The Girl from Fano =

1941 film by Hans Schweikart

- Directed by: Hans Schweikart
- Written by: Kurt Heuser
- Based on: The Girl from Fano by Günther Weisenborn
- Produced by: Curt Prickler
- Starring: Brigitte Horney; Joachim Gottschalk; Gustav Knuth; Viktoria von Ballasko
- Cinematography: Carl Hoffmann
- Edited by: Werner Jacobs
- Music by: Alois Melichar
- Production company: Bavaria Film
- Distributed by: Bavaria Film
- Release date: 24 January 1941
- Running time: 97 minutes
- Country: Nazi Germany
- Language: German

The Girl from Fano (German: Das Mädchen von Fanö) is a 1941 German drama film directed by Hans Schweikart and starring Brigitte Horney, Joachim Gottschalk and Gustav Knuth. It was shot at the Bavaria Studios in Munich and the Babelsberg Studios in Berlin and on location around Hiddensee. The film's sets were designed by the art directors Rudolf Pfenninger and Ludwig Reiber. The film is based on a novel by Günther Weisenborn and is set amongst the fishing community of the Danish island of Fanø.

== Synopsis ==
During a violent storm lifelong friends and fishermen Frerk and Ipke seek refuge on the Danish island of Fanø where they both fall in love with a local woman named Patricia. This sudden rivalry creates a deep rift between the two old friends, further complicated by the fact that Ipke is already married.

== Cast ==
- Brigitte Horney as Patricia
- Joachim Gottschalk as Fischer Ipke
- Gustav Knuth as Fischer Frerk
- Viktoria von Ballasko as Ipkes Frau Angens
- Gerhard Bienert as Hinnerk
- Paul Bildt as Kapellmeister Breitling
- Helmut Brasch as Klaus
- Karl Dannemann as Bootsmann
- Walter Hillbring as Bootsverleiher
- Luise Hohorst as Krankenschwester
- Fritz Hoopts as Leuchtturmwärter Jens
- Hans Kraft as Reisender
- Wilhelm P. Krüger as Dusenschön
- Justus Paris as Dr. Sperling
- Joachim Pfaff as Kind
- Fritz Reiff as Patentanwalt
- Heddo Schulenburg as Schiffsjunge
- Charlotte Schultz as Berthe
- Isa Vermehren as Volig
- Franz Weber as Friseur
- Paul Wegener as Ulerk Ohm
- Helmut Weiss as Eleganter Herr

== Bibliography ==
- Hake, Sabine. Popular Cinema of the Third Reich. University of Texas Press, 2001.
