= The Dance Goes On (1930 film) =

1930 film

- Directed by: William Dieterle
- Written by: George Kibbe Turner; Heinrich Fraenkel
- Produced by: Henry Blanke
- Starring: William Dieterle; Lissy Arna; Anton Pointner
- Cinematography: Sidney Hickox
- Music by: Erno Rapee
- Production company: Warner Bros.
- Distributed by: Warner Bros.
- Release date: November 3, 1930
- Running time: 80 minutes
- Country: United States
- Language: German

The Dance Goes On (German: Der Tanz geht weiter) is a 1930 American crime film directed by William Dieterle and starring Dieterle, Lissy Arna and Anton Pointner. It was made by Warner Brothers as the German-language version of their film Those Who Dance.

== Cast ==
- William Dieterle as Fred Hogan
- Lissy Arna as Elly
- Anton Pointner as Joe
- Carla Bartheel as Kitty, Joe's girlfriend
- Werner Klingler as Tim, Elly's brother
- John Reinhardt as Pat Hogan
- Philipp Lothar Mayring as Benson

== Bibliography ==
- Reimer, Robert C. & Reimer, Carol J. The A to Z of German Cinema. Scarecrow Press, 2010.
