= Ingolf Kuntze =

German actor (1890–1952)

- Born: 31 May 1890; Hainichen, Saxony, German Empire
- Died: 24 July 1952 (aged 62); Munich, Bavaria, West Germany
- Occupation: Actor
- Years active: 1931-1952 (film)

Ingolf Kuntze (1890–1952) was a German stage and film actor. He was active as a character actor, appearing in supporting roles in a number of films during the Nazi era.

== Selected filmography ==
- A Woman Branded (1931)
- And Who Is Kissing Me? (1933)
- Rivalen der Luft (1934)
- Winter in the Woods (1936)
- The Blue Fox (1938)
- Secret Code LB 17 (1938)
- The Secret Lie (1938)
- What Now, Sibylle? (1938)
- The Green Emperor (1939)
- The Wedding Trip (1939)
- Renate in the Quartet (1939)
- Escape in the Dark (1939)
- The Governor (1939)
- Uproar in Damascus (1939)
- Kora Terry (1940)
- The Girl from Barnhelm (1940)
- The Silent Guest (1945)
- Amico (1949)
- The Murder Trial of Doctor Jordan (1949)

== Bibliography ==
- Rolf Giesen. Nazi Propaganda Films: A History and Filmography. McFarland, 2003.
