= Secret Code LB 17 =

1938 film directed by Viktor Tourjansky

- Directed by: Victor Tourjansky
- Written by: Berthold Ebbecke; Philipp Lothar Mayring; Ludwig Metzger
- Produced by: Otto Lehmann
- Starring: Willy Birgel; Hilde Weissner; Bernhard Minetti
- Cinematography: Georg Krause
- Edited by: Gertrud Hinz-Nischwitz
- Music by: Franz Grothe
- Production company: Terra Film
- Distributed by: Terra Film
- Release date: 7 August 1938
- Running time: 91 minutes
- Country: Germany
- Language: German

Secret Code LB 17 (German: Geheimzeichen LB 17) is a 1938 German thriller film directed by Victor Tourjansky and starring Willy Birgel, Hilde Weissner and Bernhard Minetti. It was made at the Babelsberg Studios outside Berlin. The film's sets were designed by the art directors Karl Böhm and Erich Czerwonski.

== Synopsis ==
The authorities attempt to track down a terrorist group who have assassinated the Minister of War. They soon begin to suspect they have a traitor in their own ranks.

== Cast ==
- Willy Birgel as Captain Arvan Terno
- Hilde Weissner as Marya Dusanovich, alias Marja Dusan
- Bernhard Minetti as Club Manager Bjelinski
- Otto Wernicke as Police Commissar Borel
- René Deltgen as Lieutenant Robby Glawar
- Kirsten Heiberg as Singer
- Nicolas Koline as Drogan, the Commissar's aide
- Herbert Gernot as Senior Lt. Kowall
- Theodor Loos as The Prefect of Police
- Karl Günther as Vitruv - the Minister of War
- Fred Beckner as Marja's Dancing Partner
- Hildegard Busse as Marja's Guest
- Dima Detoor as Minister of War's Staff Officer
- Jac Diehl as Der Bühneninspizient der "Cascade"
- Heinz Dugall as Der Würstchendieb
- Erich Dunskus as Bahnbeamter
- Berthold Ebbecke as Der Adjutant des Kriegsministers
- Max Harry Ernst as Ein Gast in der Cascade während der Razzia
- Lucie Euler as Anna, Manja Dusans Garderobiere
- Adolf Fischer as Ein junger Proletarier am Würstchenstand
- Charles Francois as Ein Kellner beim Empfang
- Paul Ludwig Frey as Ein Gast bei Manja Dusan
- Lothar Geist as Der Zigarettenjunge in der Cascade
- Kurt Getke as Eisenbahnwärter
- Friedrich Gnaß as Ein Telefonist der Aufständigen
- Fred Goebel as Der Sergeant der Chiffrierzentrale
- Die Goldenen Sieben und ihre Symphoniker as Singers
- Paul Hildebrandt as Ein Mitarbeiter des Polizeipräfekten
- Oskar Höcker as Ein weiterer Kriminalbeamter
- Karl Jüstel as Ein Stabsoffizier beim Kriegsminister
- Alfred Karen as Gast bei Manja Dusan
- Walter Klam as Ein Bühnenarbeiter der Cascade
- Ingolf Kuntze as Innenminister
- Fred Köster as Ein Kriminalbeamter bei der Tatortinspektion
- Gustav Mahncke as Der Poriter der Cascade
- Edith Meinel as Das Blumenmädchen in der Cascade
- Benno Mueller as Ein Mann im Postamt
- Hellmuth Passarge as Einer der Aufständigen
- Paul Rehkopf as Ein Betrunkener
- Ferry Reich as Der Wachhabende der Regimentskanzlei
- Ferdinand Robert as Ein Gast bei Manja Dusan
- Ernst Rotmund as Der Würstchenverkäufer
- Bert Schmidt-Maris as Ein Gast in der Cascade
- Willi Schur as 1. Polizist
- Herbert Spalke as 2. Polizist
- Margot Thilo as Marga, Annas Mädchen
- Theodor Thony as Ein Stabsoffizier beim Kriegsminister
- Otz Tollen as Ein General, Mitarbeiter des Kriegsministers
- Jens von Hagen as Gast bei Manja Dusan
- Eduard Wenck as Der Stationsvorsteher
- Max Wilmsen as Der Angestellte im Postamt
- Willy Witte as Ein Gast in der "Cascade"

== Bibliography ==
- Noack, Frank. Veit Harlan: The Life and Work of a Nazi Filmmaker. University Press of Kentucky, 2016.
