= Rotkäppchen =

1962 film

- Directed by: Götz Friedrich
- Starring: Blanche Kommerell; Horst Kube; Helga Raumer
- Music by: Gerhard Wohlgemuth
- Release date: 1962
- Country: East Germany
- Language: German

Rotkäppchen is an East German film based on the Brothers Grimm version of the fairy tale Little Red Riding Hood, as well as the play by Evgeny Schwartz. It was released in 1962, and sold 5,769,400 tickets.
