= The Desert Song (1939 film) =

1939 film

- Directed by: Paul Martin
- Written by: Werner Illing; Walter von Hollander; Paul Martin
- Produced by: Hans Conradi
- Starring: Zarah Leander; Friedrich Domin; Gustav Knuth
- Cinematography: Franz Weihmayr
- Edited by: Gertrud Hinz-Nischwitz
- Music by: Nico Dostal
- Production company: UFA
- Distributed by: UFA
- Release date: 17 November 1939
- Running time: 87 minutes
- Country: Germany
- Language: German

The Desert Song (German: Das Lied der Wüste) is a 1939 German drama film directed by Paul Martin and starring Zarah Leander, Friedrich Domin and Gustav Knuth. It was shot at the Babelsberg Studios in Berlin. The film's sets were designed by the art director Otto Hunte and Karl Vollbrecht.

== Cast ==
- Zarah Leander as Grace Collins
- Friedrich Domin as Sir Collins, ihr Stiefvater
- Gustav Knuth as Nic Brenten, Ingenieur
- Herbert Wilk as Frank Stanney, Captain
- Ernst Karchow as Oberst Balentine
- Rolf Heydel as Leutnant Scott
- Karl Günther as Kommissar
- Franz Schafheitlin as Finanzier
- Hermann Wagner as Hamed, Brentens Diener
- Herbert Klatt as Jack, Stanneys Bursche
- Helmut Brasch as Sam
- Karl Dannemann as Tom
- Hermann Pfeiffer as Reporter
- Gerhard Bienert as Hafenbeamter
- Fritz Draeger as Gast beim Fest des Kommissars
- Aribert Grimmer as Butler
- Peter Höfer as Soldat James
- Karl Jüstel as Ober im Hotel Royal
- Alfred Karen as Gast beim Empfang des Kommissars
- Charlie Kracker as Joe
- Eberhard Leithoff as Steve
- Renée Peter as Jane, Zofe von Grace Collins
- Ernst Sattler as Schwedische Konsul
- Wilhelm Schläger as Reporter
- Waldemar Tenscher as Telefonist
- Aruth Wartan as 2. Finanzier

== Bibliography ==
- Bruns, Jana Francesca. Nazi Cinema's New Women: Marika Roekk, Zarah Leander, Kristina Soederbaum. Stanford University, 2002.
- Klaus, Ulrich J. Deutsche Tonfilme: Jahrgang 1939. Klaus-Archiv, 1988.
- Moeller, Felix. The Film Minister: Goebbels and the Cinema in the Third Reich. Axel Menges, 2000.
