= Ita Rina =

Slovenian film actress and beauty queen (1907-1979)

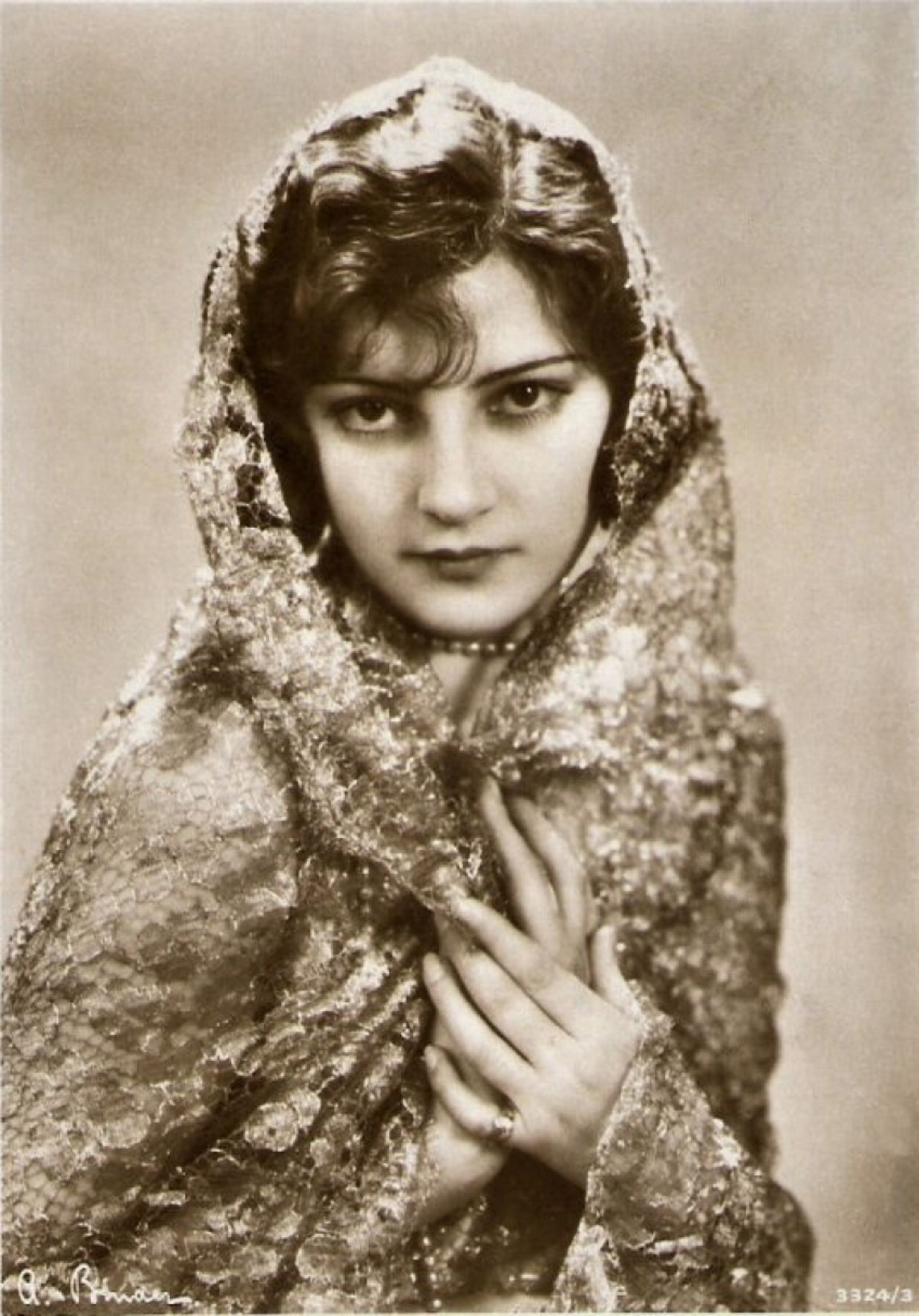
- Ita Rina, ca. 1928/1929
- Born: Italina Lida Kravanja; 7 July 1907; Divača, Gorizia and Gradisca, Austria-Hungary
- Died: 10 May 1979 (aged 71); Budva, SR Montenegro, SFR Yugoslavia
- Occupation: Actress
- Years active: 1927–1939, 1960
- Spouse: Miodrag Đorđević (m. 1931)
- Children: 2

Tamara Đorđević (born Italina Lida Kravanja; 7 July 1907 – 10 May 1979), known professionally as Ita Rina, was a Slovenian film actress and beauty queen. She was one of the major film stars in Germany and Czechoslovakia in the late 1920s and the early 1930s. Rina retired from her career shortly after her wedding in 1931, when she changed her religion from Roman Catholic to Serbian Orthodox and her name to Tamara Đorđević.

== Early life and modeling career (1907–1926) ==
Ita Rina was born on 7 July 1907 in the small town of Divača (then Austro-Hungarian Empire, later Yugoslavia, now Slovenia) as Italina Lida Kravanja. She was called Ida Kravanja for short. The first daughter of Jožef and Marija Kravanja, Rina had a younger sister Danica. Shortly after the outbreak of the World War I, the family moved to Ljubljana, where Rina matriculated in 1923. She was not a good student; she repeated the third grade of elementary school. However, her dream was to be an actress.

In October 1926, Slovenski narod (Slovenian People) magazine organized a beauty pageant, and Rina entered the competition. She was crowned Miss Slovenia and was to travel to the final event for Miss Yugoslavia, which was supposed to be held on 20 December 1926 in Zagreb. However, her mother did not want to let her go to Zagreb. After a group visit from the Slovenian delegation, Marija Kravanja relented. Unfortunately, when Rina arrived in Zagreb, the jury was already choosing the most beautiful of three finalists. She was, however, noticed by Adolf Müller, the owner of Balkan Palace cinema in Zagreb. He immediately sent her photographs to German film producer Peter Ostermayer. As her mother did not want to let her go to Berlin, Rina ran away from home.

== Film breakthrough and success (1927–1939) ==
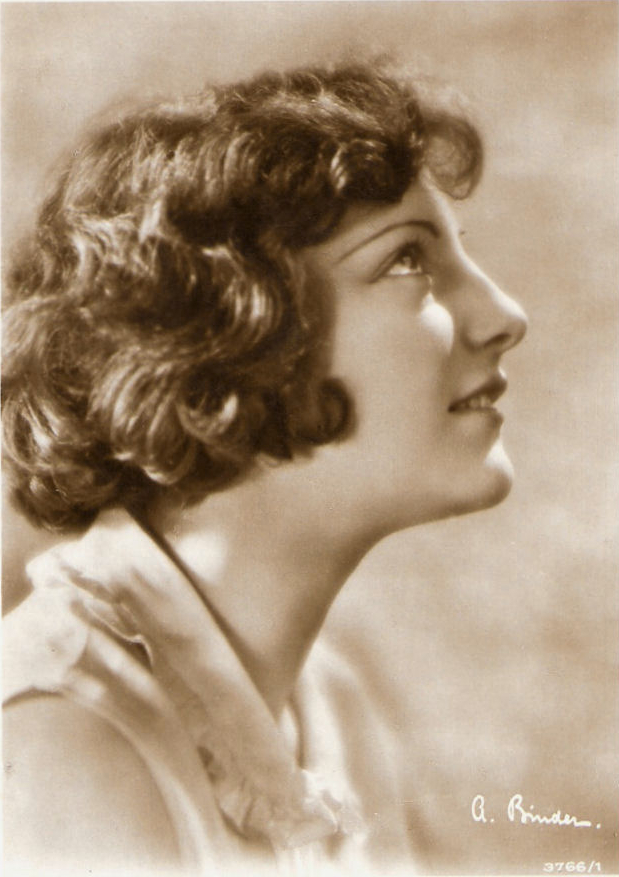
Ita Rina in 1928 or 1929

Rina arrived in Berlin in 1927. Shortly after she had her first audition, following which she had classes in acting, diction, dancing, driving and riding. She made her debut in the 1927 film What Do Children Hide from Their Parents, directed by Franz Osten. After several small film roles in 1927 and 1928, the critics finally noticed her in the 1928 film The Last Supper. The same year, Rina met her future husband Miodrag Đorđević, a student. Her big breakthrough came the following year, in the film Erotikon, directed by Gustav Machatý. She starred in the leading female role, Andrea. The great success of the film upset some moral and Christian organizations. The Catholic theologian Abbot Bethlem wrote: "... First, they lie next to each other, and then on top of each other... It is true that the covering hides their figures, but it certainly does not hide their movements... The face of each protagonist is shown in close-up, especially Ita's face... A viewer can recognize her excitement, then her expression of apprehension mixed with longing, then pain and finally... I blush while describing the scenes". This was, however, the best advertisement for the film, and the beginning of Rina's career.

In 1930, Rina acted in three films, most notable being the first talking Czech film Tonka of the Gallows, which is often named her best role. Meanwhile, she married Miodrag Đorđević in 1931, and changed her religion from Roman Catholic to Serbian Orthodox. Rina was baptised in the Russian Orthodox Church, and also got her new Orthodox name, Tamara Đorđević. "I wanted to be named Ljubica, but the Russian priest would not allow that name. He proposed to me the Russian variety, Ljubov, but I refused it. So, I was named Tamara", Rina stated about her change of name. The same year, Rina was given an offer from Hollywood, but her husband forced her to choose between her career and their marriage; Rina chose to stay with him. Although she had announced her retirement from her film career, she acted until the outbreak of World War II. Her last prewar film was crime drama Zentrale Rio.

== Marriage, later years and death (1940–1979) ==
After she left her film career, Rina and her husband settled in Belgrade. In 1940, she gave birth to their son Milan. After the bombing of Belgrade in 1941, the family moved to Vrnjačka Banja, where Rina gave birth to a daughter, Tijana. They moved back to Belgrade after the end of World War II in 1945. Although she was promised several roles in Yugoslav films, all projects were cancelled. After receipt of a letter she had written to President Tito, Rina began working as a co–production advisor in Avala Film. She returned to the silver screen once, in the 1960 film Atomic War Bride, directed by Veljko Bulajić. This was her last role.

As she suffered from asthma, Rina and her husband moved to Budva (then Yugoslavia, now Montenegro) in 1967. There, she took care of her husband, who was ill with sclerosis. Rina died on 10 May 1979 from an asthmatic attack. She was buried a few days later in Belgrade, in the presence of numerous film artists, admirers, friends and family.

== Filmography ==
Year	Title	Format	Role	Notes
1927	Was die Kinder ihren Eltern verschweigen	Film		
1927	Two Under the Stars	Film		
1928	Because I Love You	Film		
1928	Theatre	Film	Maria	
1929	Wilde Ehen	Film		
1929	Erotikon	Film	Andrea	
1929	Spring Awakening	Film	Ilse	
1929	Disgrace	Film	Marta Holanová	
1930	Tonka of the Gallows	Film	Tonka Šibenice	
1930	Der Walzerkönig	Film	Seine Tochter	
1930	Kire lained	Film	Betty	
1933	Život teče dalje	Film		
1933	Song of the Black Mountains	Film	Jela Gruić	
1935	A život jde dál	Film	Marie	
1937	The Coral Princess	Film	Anka, Vukowitsch' Pflegetochter	
1939	Central Rio	Film	Chiquita Salieri	
1960	Atomic War Bride	Film	Mother	
