= Blanche Kommerell =

German actress and writer (born 1950)

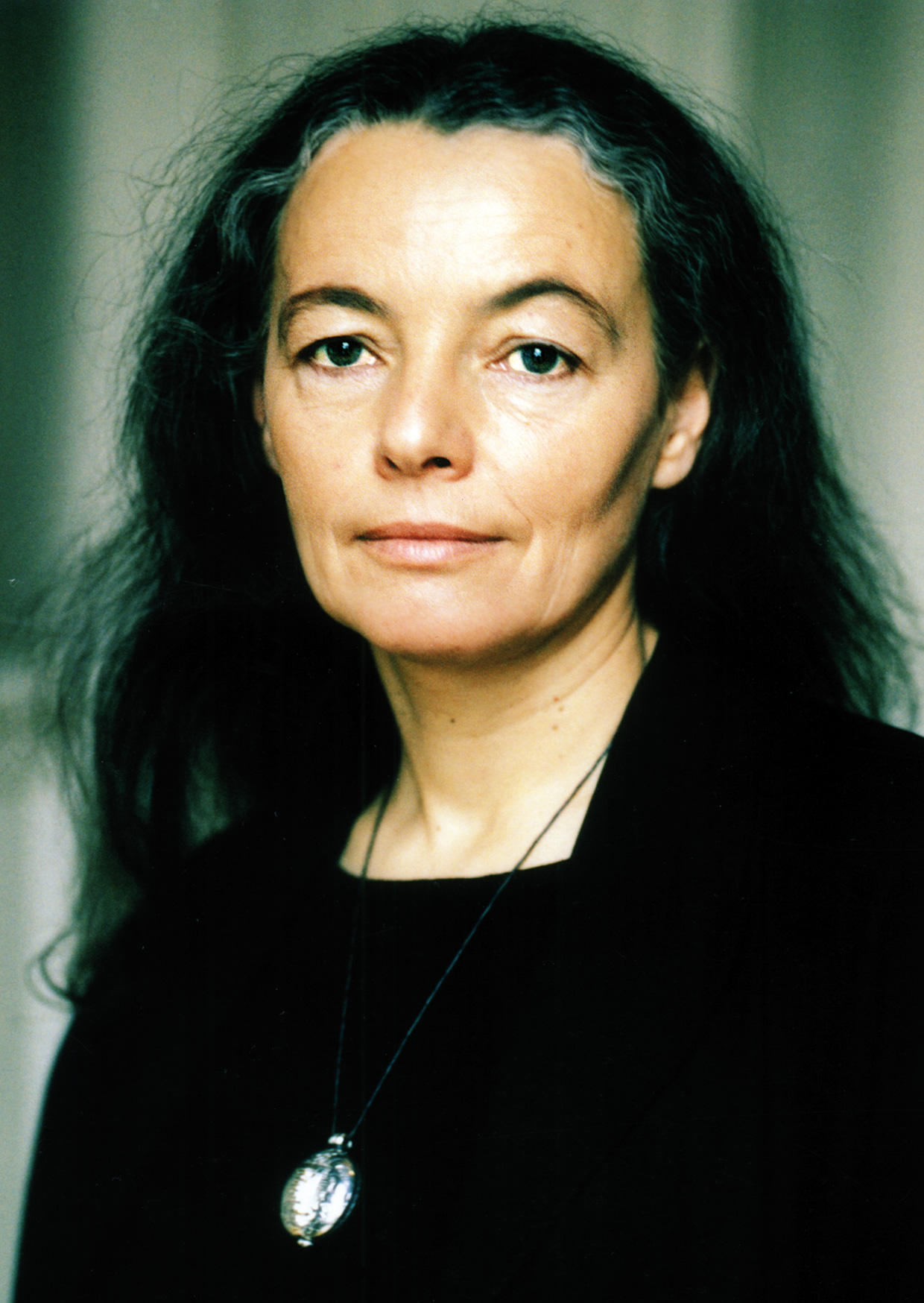
- Blanche Kommerell (2007)
- Born: 10 March 1950 (age 76); Halle (Saale), East Germany
- Occupation: Actress
- Years active: 1962-present

Blanche Kommerell (born 10 March 1950) is a German actress and writer. She has appeared in more than fifty films since 1962. She was a daughter of actress Ruth Kommerell.

== Selected filmography ==
Film
Year	Title	Role	Notes
1962	Rotkäppchen	Rotkäppchen	
1966	The Sons of Great Bear		
1970	Effi Briest		
1974	… verdammt, ich bin erwachsen	Junge Kindergärtnerin	
1974	Jacob the Liar	Rosa Frankfurter	
1975	Looping		
1976	Das blaue Licht	Anne	
1988	Die Schauspielerin	Judith Baumann	
