= A Woman Like You (1939 film) =

- Directed by: Viktor Tourjansky
- Written by: Dinah Nelken (novella); Peter Francke; Emil Burri
- Produced by: Carl Wilhelm Tetting
- Starring: Brigitte Horney; Joachim Gottschalk; Hans Brausewetter; Charlotte Susa
- Cinematography: Karl Puth
- Edited by: Walter Fredersdorf
- Music by: Lothar Brühne
- Production company: Bavaria Film
- Distributed by: Bavaria Film
- Release date: 19 October 1939
- Running time: 93 minutes
- Country: Germany
- Language: German

A Woman Like You (German: Eine Frau wie Du) is a 1939 German romance film directed by Viktor Tourjansky and starring Brigitte Horney, Joachim Gottschalk and Hans Brausewetter.

== Synopsis ==
A young woman lives an unfulfilled life until she falls in love during a holiday abroad.

== Cast ==
- Brigitte Horney as Dr. Maria Pretorius
- Joachim Gottschalk as Dr. Manfred Thiele
- Hans Brausewetter as Dr. Paul Hellmer
- Charlotte Susa as Lyda Lehmann
- Volker von Collande as Ingenieur Wallrodt
- Kurt Meisel as Felix Petersen
- Charlotte Schultz as Fräulein Radtke
- Albert Florath as Fabrikarzt
- Hans Leibelt as Wachtmeister
- Hubert von Meyerinck as Verkäufer im Sportgeschäft
- Renée Stobrawa as Frau Haucke
- Eduard Wenck as Herr Haucke
- Vera Hartegg as Hilde Keller
- Eric Helgar as Klavierspieler
- Rudi Schuricke as Klavierspieler
- Marian Lex as Frau Bahlke
- Heinrich Kalnberg as Max Hähnchen
- Hanna Lussnigg as Kitty
- Leonie Duval as Verkäuferin im Delikatessengeschäft
- Otto Sauter-Sarto as Waldhüter
- Margarete Kupfer as Blumenfrau
- Hanns Waschatko as Krankenhausarzt
- Fritz Eckert as Assistenzarzt
- Maria Seidler as Oberschwester
- Ernst Rotmund as Hotelportier in Venedig
- Else Reval as Blumenfrau in der Bar
- Erich Haußmann as Gondoliere
- Walter Schenk as Oberkellner

== Bibliography ==
- Hake, Sabine. Popular Cinema of the Third Reich. University of Texas Press, 2001.
