= Karl Böhm (art director) =

German art director

- Born: 11 January 1882; Zielenzig, German Empire
- Died: 28 July 1942 (aged 60); Berlin, Germany
- Occupation: Art director
- Years active: 1928-1942 (film)

Karl Böhm or Carl Böhm (1882-1942) was a German art director who designed the sets for a number of films during the Nazi era.

== Selected filmography ==
- Such a Rascal (1934)
- Light Cavalry (1935)
- The Schimeck Family (1935)
- Streak of Steel (1935)
- Tango Notturno (1937)
- Gordian the Tyrant (1937)
- The Secret Lie (1938)
- Dangerous Crossing (1937)
- Secret Code LB 17 (1938)
- Freight from Baltimore (1938)
- The Merciful Lie (1939)
- Midsummer Night's Fire (1939)
- Uproar in Damascus (1939)
- My Daughter Doesn't Do That (1940)
- Six Days of Leave (1941)
- Jakko (1941)

== Bibliography ==
- Giesen, Rolf. Nazi Propaganda Films: A History and Filmography. McFarland, 2003.
