= Brigitte Horney =

German actress (1911–1988)

- Born: 29 March 1911; Dahlem, Province of Brandenburg, Prussia, German Empire
- Died: 27 July 1988 (aged 77); Hamburg, West Germany
- Occupation: Actress
- Years active: 1930–1983
- Spouses: Konstantin Irmen-Tschet (m. 1940–1953) Hanns Swarzenski (m. 1953; died 1985)

Brigitte Horney (German: [bʁiˈɡɪ.tə ˈhɔʁ.naɪ̯]; 29 March 1911 – 27 July 1988) was a German theatre and film actress. Best remembered was her role as Empress Katherine the Great in the film Münchhausen, directed by Josef von Báky, with Hans Albers in the title role.

== Early life ==
Brigitte Horney was born and grew up in Dahlem, Berlin, the daughter of noted psychoanalyst Karen Horney.

== Career ==
She was, for more than a decade, engaged with Berlin's Volksbühne. When she accepted the starring role in the highly popular film Love, Death and the Devil (1934), a new star was born with the Leitmotif song "So oder so ist das Leben". Two years later she would play the love interest of famous actor Hans Albers’s character in the film Savoy Hotel 217.

Horney was a good friend of the actor Joachim Gottschalk and appeared in four films with him. Although Gottschalk had fallen from favor with Nazi officials, Horney attended Gottschalk's funeral (Germany, 1941), regardless of the political and career implications of doing so.

== Personal life ==
After the Second World War she became an American citizen, but continued to visit Germany frequently, where she had a house in Bavaria. She married the eminent Jewish art historian Hanns Swarzenski, a leading authority on German Romanesque manuscripts.

== Death ==
She continued to work in films and television (i.e. Oliver Twist) until her death. She died in Hamburg, June 27, 1988.

== Selected filmography ==
=== Film ===
- Farewell (1930) - Hella, retailer
- Fra Diavolo (1931) - Anita
- Rasputin, Demon with Women (1932)
- The Country Schoolmaster (1933) - Martha Detlefsen
- A Man Wants to Get to Germany (1934) - Manuela Ortiguez
- The Eternal Dream (1934) - Maria
- Love, Death and the Devil (1934) - Ruby
- Blood Brothers (1935) - Mara, die Magd
- The Eternal Dream (1935) - Marie
- The Green Domino (1935) - Ellen Fehling / Marianne Fehling
- Savoy Hotel 217 (1936) - Nastasja Andrejevna Daschenko
- City of Anatol (1936) - Franziska Maniu
- The House of the Spaniard (1936) - Margarita de Guzman
- Secret Lives (1937) - Lena Schmidt
- Der Katzensteg (1937) - Dienstmagd Regine Hackelberg - Tochter
- Faded Melody (1938) - Barbara Lorenz
- Revolutionary Wedding (1938) - Aline
- Anna Favetti (1938) - Anna Favetti
- You and I (1938) - Anna Uhlig
- Uproar in Damascus (1939) - Vera Niemayer
- Target in the Clouds (1939) - Margot Boje
- The Governor (1939) - Maria
- A Woman Like You (1939) - Dr. Maria Pretorius
- Liberated Hands (1939) - Dürthen, Schafhirtin
- Enemies (1940) - Anna
- The Girl from Fano (1941) - Patricia
- Illusion (1941) - Maria Roth
- Beloved World (1942) - Karin Ranke
- Baron Munchhausen (1943) - Tsarin Catherine II
- Am Ende der Welt (1947) - Roberta Bell
- Die Frau am Weg (1948) - Christine
- Verspieltes Leben (1949) - Ulyssa von Siebenmühlen
- Melody of Fate (1950)
- As Long as You're Near Me (1953) - Mona Arendt
- Prisoners of Love (1954) - Dr. Hildegard Thomas
- The Last Summer (1954) - Tatjana Tolemainen
- The Glass Tower (1957) - Dr. Bruning
- Darkness Fell on Gotenhafen (1960) - Generalin von Reuss
- The Inheritance of Bjorndal (1960) - Tante Eleonore
- The Cry of the Wild Geese (1961) - Mrs. Sandbo
- Miracle of the White Stallions (1963) - Countess Arco-Valley
- Neues vom Hexer (1965) - Lady Aston
- I Am Looking for a Man (1966) - Helene Schmidt
- The Trygon Factor (1966) - Sister General
- Old Mamsell's Secret (1972, TV film) - Cordula Hellwig
- Haus der Frauen (1977, TV film) - Julia
- Charlotte (1981) - Grandma
- Bella Donna (1983) - Jutta

=== Television ===
- Derrick - Season 4, Episode 3: "Eine Nacht im Oktober" (1977) - Mrs. Lechner
- Heidi (1978, TV series) - Grandmother
- Derrick - Season 7, Episode 6: "Die Entscheidung" (1980) - Ina Hauff
- Huckleberry Finn and His Friends (1980, TV miniseries) - Aunt Polly
- Jakob und Adele (1982–1989, TV series) - Adele Schliemann
- Teufels Großmutter (1986, TV series) - Dorothea Teufel
- Das Erbe der Guldenburgs (1987–1989, TV series) - Hertha von Guldenburg (final appearance)
