= Freight from Baltimore =

1938 film

- Directed by: Hans Hinrich
- Written by: Hans Joachim Beyer; Charlotte Rissmann
- Produced by: Alfred Greven
- Starring: Hilde Weissner; Attila Hörbiger; Hans Zesch-Ballot
- Cinematography: Karl Puth
- Edited by: Gertrud Hinz-Nischwitz
- Music by: Fritz Wenneis
- Production company: Terra Film
- Distributed by: Terra Film
- Release date: 14 October 1938
- Running time: 104 minutes
- Country: Germany
- Language: German

Freight from Baltimore (German: Fracht von Baltimore) is a 1938 German drama film directed by Hans Hinrich and starring Hilde Weissner, Attila Hörbiger, and Hans Zesch-Ballot. Interiors were shot at the Tempelhof Studios in Berlin. The film's sets were designed by the art directors Carl Böhm and Erich Czerwonski. It was partly shot on location at the Port of Hamburg.

== Cast ==
- Hilde Weissner as Sabine Heitmann
- Attila Hörbiger as Michael Anders, 1. Offizier der Reederei Heitmann
- Hans Zesch-Ballot as William Morris, Generalagent
- Paul Westermeier as Mecki McKnight
- Walter Steinbeck as Konrad Engström
- Walter Werner as Hoffmann, Prokurist der Reederei Heitmann
- Annemarie Steinsieck as Elisabeth Engström
- Hans Nielsen as Kurt Engström
- Elsa Wagner as Frau Konsul Engström
- Herti Kirchner as Kitty Hansen
- Franz Weber as Knaak, Bürodiener der Reederei
- Günther Ballier as 1. Offizier an Bord der 'Sesotris'
- Edwin Jürgensen as Friedrich Holst, Großkaufmann
- Maria Krahn as Frau Holst
- Claire Reigbert as Frau Hansen, Wirtin der 'Ohio-Bar'
- Ludwig Andersen
- Otto Braml as Lotse der Hamburger Hafenverwaltung
- Kurt Felden as Matrose der 'Sesotris'
- Angelo Ferrari as Französischer Offizier des geretteten Dampfers
- Adolf Fischer as Funker der Reederei Heitmann
- Herbert Gernot as Schiffsingenieur bei Engström
- Fred Goebel as Funker an Bord der 'Sesotris'
- Aribert Grimmer as Schiffsingenieur bei Engström
- Karl Hannemann as Schröder, Prokurist bei Engström
- Josef Kamper as Grothe, Schiffsoffizier der Reederei Heitmann
- Charlie Kracker as Matrose der Reederei Heitmann
- Alfred Maack as Matrose der Reederei Heitmann
- Luise Morland as Morris' Tischdame beim Empfang bei Engström
- Odette Orsy as Gast beim Empfang bei Engström
- Gustav Püttjer as Der Barbier an Bord
- Erika Streithorst as Fräulein Lorenz
- Lothar Geist as Lehrjunge der Reederei Heitmann
- Hansjakob Gröblinghoff as Matrose der 'Sesotris'
- Max Hiller as Schneidermeister bei Hoffmann
- Carl Iban as Matrose der 'Sesortis'
- Alfred Karen as Generalkonsul bei Engström
- Ursula Kerrl as Mädchen bei Sabine Heitmann
- Fred Köster as Diener bei Engström
- Paul Luka as Matrose der 'Sesortis'
- Arthur Reppert as Matrose der 'Sesotris'
- Heinz Roggenkamp as Bekannte Holsts bei Engström
- Ernst Albert Schaach as Fernschreiber
- Annelis Schneidereyt
- Alfred Stratmann as Deutscher Funker

== Bibliography ==
- Klaus, Ulrich J. Deutsche Tonfilme: Jahrgang 1938. Klaus-Archiv, 1988.
- Rentschler, Eric (1996). The Ministry of Illusion: Nazi Cinema and Its Afterlife. Cambridge, MA: Harvard University Press. ISBN 978-0-674-57640-7.
