= The Noltenius Brothers =

1945 film

- Directed by: Gerhard Lamprecht
- Written by: Fritz Gray; Richard H. Riedel; Frank Thieß
- Produced by: Richard H. Riedel
- Starring: Willy Birgel; Hilde Weissner; Eugen Klöpfer
- Cinematography: Reimar Kuntze
- Edited by: Luise Dreyer-Sachsenberg
- Music by: Hans-Otto Borgmann
- Production company: UFA
- Distributed by: Deutsche Filmvertriebs
- Release date: 7 April 1945
- Running time: 87 minutes
- Country: Germany
- Language: German

The Noltenius Brothers (German: Die Brüder Noltenius) is a 1945 German drama film directed by Gerhard Lamprecht and starring Willy Birgel, Hilde Weissner and Eugen Klöpfer. Released in Berlin on 7 April, it was, by most accounts, the last of the twelve films released in Nazi Germany in 1945, before capitulation on 7 May (Via Mala received its first public showing on the same day in Mayrhofen, but did not make it to the cinemas before January 1948). It was shot at the Babelsberg Studios in Potsdam and Tempelhof Studios in Berlin. The film's sets were designed by the art director Erich Kettelhut.

== Synopsis ==
The architect Wolfgang Noltenius returns to his German hometown after many years away in Brazil. His modernist worldview contrasts with the more traditional attitudes of his brother Werner, also an architect. They become rivals over a new town planning scheme. Further tension arises from Wolgang's past relationship with Leonore, now Werner's wife.

== Cast ==
- Willy Birgel as Wolfgang Noltenius
- Karl Mathias as Werner Noltenius
- Hilde Weissner as Leonore, dessen Frau
- Eugen Klöpfer as Mr. Karsten
- Adelheid Seeck as Miss Karsten
- Karl Schönböck as Baron Kontakt
- Gunnar Möller as Jürgen Noltenius, Sohn
- Ida Wüst as Baronin von Terlingen
- Ernst Karchow as Bürgermeister Greifenberg
- Arthur Schröder as Ingenieur Friebe
- Adolf Ziegler
- Robert Forsch
- Hildegard Knef
- Hella Thornegg
- Gertrud de Lalsky
- Leopold von Ledebur
- Hans Meyer-Hanno
- F.W. Schröder-Schrom

== Bibliography ==
- Bock, Hans-Michael; Bergfelder, Tim, eds. (2009). The Concise Cinegraph: Encyclopaedia of German Cinema. New York: Berghahn Books. ISBN 978-1-57181-655-9.
