= The Secret Lie =

1938 film directed by Nunzio Malasomma

- Directed by: Nunzio Malasomma
- Written by: Philipp Lothar Mayring; Hadrian Maria Netto (play); Harald G. Petersson
- Produced by: Ottmar Ostermayr
- Starring: Pola Negri; Hermann Braun; Herbert Hübner
- Cinematography: Karl Hasselmann
- Edited by: Gertrud Hinz-Nischwitz
- Music by: Franz Grothe
- Production company: Terra Film
- Distributed by: Terra Film
- Release date: 25 March 1938
- Running time: 80 minutes
- Country: Nazi Germany
- Language: German

The Secret Lie (German: Die fromme Lüge) is a 1938 German drama film directed by Nunzio Malasomma and starring Pola Negri, Hermann Braun, and Herbert Hübner. The film's sets were designed by the art directors Carl Böhm and Erich Czerwonski.

== Cast ==
- Pola Negri as Carmen Casini
- Hermann Braun as Cecil Lasko
- Herbert Hübner as Bartell
- Harald Paulsen as Smith
- Josefine Dora as Theres
- Suse Graf as Colette
- Hansi Arnstaedt as Mrs. Latour
- Hans Leibelt as Sam Milbrey
- Jupp Hussels as Rennbahnreporter
- Walter Gross as Rundfunkreporter
- Ernst Legal as Bankdirektor, Finanzberater Carmens
- S.O. Schoening as Doktor, Spieler am Pokertisch
- Lotte Spira as Darsteller
- Leo Peukert as Opernhausdirektor
- Günther Ballier as Fetscherin, Hans
- Jens von Hagen as Spieler am Pokertisch
- Karl Hannemann as Portier im Konzertsaal
- William Huch as Konzertsaaldiener
- Ingolf Kuntze as Herr Professor
- Karl Platen as Konzertsaaldiener
- Klaus Pohl as Bildberichterstatter
- Oscar Sabo as Polizist
- Ernst Albert Schaach as Bildberichterstatter
- Liselotte Schaak as Krankenschwester
- Heinrich Schroth as Chefarzt
- Erika Streithorst as Angestellte an der Hotelrezeption

== Bibliography ==
- Kotowski, Mariusz (2014). Pola Negri: Hollywood's First Femme Fatale. Lexington: University Press of Kentucky. ISBN 978-0-8131-4489-4.
