= Friedrich Gnaß =

German actor

- Born: 13 November 1892; Langendreer, German Empire
- Died: 8 May 1958 (aged 65); East Berlin, East Germany
- Other name: Friedrich Gnass
- Occupation: Actor
- Years active: 1929–1958

Friedrich Gnaß (13 November 1892 – 8 May 1958) was a German film actor. He appeared in 53 films between 1929 and 1958.

== Partial filmography ==
- Beyond the Street (1929) – Der Matrose / The Sailor
- Mother Krause's Journey to Happiness (1929) – Max
- Revolt in the Reformatory (1930)
- Troika (1930) – Stephan, troika driver
- Danton (1931) – Sanson
- Fra Diavolo (1931) – Rodomonte
- M (1931) – Franz
- Kameradschaft (1931) – Fritz – Rescue Volunteer
- Louise, Queen of Prussia (1931)
- Rasputin, Demon with Women (1932) – Derewenko
- Raid in St. Pauli (1932) – Karl the Sailor
- I by Day, You by Night (1932) – Helmut
- Morgenrot (1933) – Juraczik
- The Star of Valencia (1933) – Diego
- Refugees (1933) – Hussar
- Achtung! Wer kennt diese Frau? (1934) – Carlo Fiori
- Abenteuer eines jungen Herrn in Polen (1934) – Prisoner
- Blood Brothers (1935)
- Hundred Days (1935) – Ney
- Henker, Frauen und Soldaten (1935)
- Travelling People (1938) – Bosko
- Secret Code LB 17 (1938) – Ein Telefonist der Aufständigen
- Capriccio (1938) – Erster Hahnenkämpfer
- Northern Lights (1938) – Lappen-Nils
- Rubber (1938) – Antonio, ein Vaquero
- Sergeant Berry (1938) – Duffy (uncredited)
- Pour le Mérite (1938) – Herr Holzapfel
- Uproar in Damascus (1939) – Funker Gerlach
- Legion Condor (1939)
- Wozzeck (1947) – Spießrutenläufer
- Die Buntkarierten (1949) – Großvater
- The Beaver Coat (1949) – Julius Wolff
- Our Daily Bread (1949) – Albrecht
- The Benthin Family (1950) – Arbeiter im Demontagewerk
- Der Untertan (1951) – Napoleon Fischer
- Story of a Young Couple (1952) – Hotelportier
- The Condemned Village (1952) – Bauer Scheffler
- Shadow Over the Islands (1952) – Bredeholm
- Frauenschicksale (1952) – Karl Neumann
- Anna Susanna (1953) – Fietjes Vater
- Die Geschichte vom kleinen Muck (1953) – Stadtwächter
- Ernst Thälmann (1954) – Hauswirt
- Leuchtfeuer (1954) – Alter Mann mit Prothese
- Wer seine Frau lieb hat (1955) – Dörr
- Once Is Never (1955) – Hunzele
- Spielbank-Affäre (1957) – Betrunkener
- Katzgraben (1957) – Kleinschmidt, ein Kleinbauer
- Spur in die Nacht (1957) – Der alte Grabbert
- Der Fackelträger (1957) – Kabische
- Gejagt bis zum Morgen (1957) – Vater Baumann
- Die Schönste (1957)
- Escape from Sahara (1958) – Germanini
