= Uproar in Damascus =

- German film poster
- German: Aufruhr in Damaskus
- Directed by: Gustav Ucicky
- Written by: Jacob Geis; Philipp Lothar Mayring; Herbert Tjadens
- Produced by: Otto Lehmann
- Starring: Brigitte Horney; Joachim Gottschalk; Hans Nielsen; Ernst von Klipstein
- Cinematography: Paul Rischke; Oskar Schnirch
- Edited by: Gertrud Hinz-Nischwitz
- Music by: Willy Schmidt-Gentner
- Production company: Terra Film
- Distributed by: Terra Film
- Release date: 8 March 1939
- Running time: 103 minutes
- Country: Germany
- Language: German

Uproar in Damascus (German: Aufruhr in Damaskus) is a 1939 German thriller film directed by Gustav Ucicky and starring Brigitte Horney, Joachim Gottschalk and Hans Nielsen. It is set during the First World War with German troops battling the Arab Revolt led by Lawrence of Arabia and the British. The film was officially honored as "artistically valuable" (künstlerisch wertvoll) and having "special political value" (staatspolitisch wertvoll).

It was made at the Marienfelde Studios in Berlin with extensive location shooting in Italian-ruled Libya, particularly around the capital Tripoli. The film's sets were designed by the art directors Karl Böhm and Erich Czerwonski.

== Cast ==
- Brigitte Horney as Vera Niemayer
- Joachim Gottschalk as Lieutenant Hans Keller
- Hans Nielsen as Hauptmann Schulz
- Ernst von Klipstein as Lance corporal von Elmendonck
- Paul Otto as Hauptmann Lamberty
- Ingolf Kuntze as Stabsarzt Bruckner
- Paul Westermeier as Sergeant Kroll
- Gerhard Bienert as Sergeant Lemcke
- Friedrich Gnaß as Gerlach, radio operator
- Ludwig Schmid-Wildy as Lachner
- Adolf Fischer as Spoekmann
- Willi Rose as Waitz
- Hellmuth Passarge as Krohnker
- Gustav Püttjer as Wolff
- Erich Dunskus as Proviantmeister
- Serag Meunier as Moni, Arab dealer
- Claire Reigbert as head nurse
- Erika Streithorst as nurse Elisa
- Heinz Welzel as soldier Schulz
- Franz Kossak as soldier
- Jac Diehl as soldier
- Kurt Mikulski as soldier
- Hansjakob Gröblinghoff as soldier
