= Effi Briest (1971 film) =

1971 film

- Based on: Effi Briest by Theodor Fontane
- Written by: Wolfgang Luderer
- Screenplay by: Albrecht Börner
- Story by: Christian Collin
- Directed by: Wolfgang Luderer
- Starring: See below
- Music by: Hans Hendrik Wehding
- Country of origin: East Germany
- Original language: German

Production
- Cinematography: Günter Marczinkowsky
- Editor: Ilse Peters
- Running time: 125 minutes (East Germany); 115 minutes (West Germany)

Original release
- Release: 1971

Effi Briest is a 1971 East German film directed by Wolfgang Luderer.

== Cast ==
- Angelica Domröse as Effi Briest
- Horst Schulze as Geert von Imstetten
- Walter Lendrich as Alonzo Gießhübler
- Ursula Am-Ende as Sidonie von Grasenabb
- Angelika Ritter as Hertha Jahnke
- Susanne Tischbier as Bertha Jahnke
- Marianne Wünscher as Marietta Tripelli
- Gerda Quies as Hulda Niemeyer
- Gerhard Bienert as Herr von Briest
- Inge Keller as Frau von Briest
- Dietrich Körner as Major von Crampas
- Waltraud Kramm as Frau von Crampas
- Harry Studt as Herr von Grasenabb
- Traute Sense as Frau von Grasenabb
- Heinz Hinze as Herr von Ahlemann
- Hanna Rieger as Frau von Ahlemann
- Axel Triebel as Baron von Jatzkow
- Erich Brauer as Baron von Borcke
- Hans Zimmermann as Kutscher Kruse
- Adolf Peter Hoffmann as Geheimrat Wüllersdorf
- Horst Friedrich as Dr. Rumschüttel
- Werner Schulz-Wittan as Dr. Hannemann
- Hans-Hartmut Krüger as Gizicki
- Hans Flössel as Wilke
- Hilde Kneip as Christel
- Eckhard Bilz as Dagobert
- Günther Ballier as Friedrich
- Krista Siegrid Lau as Johanna
- Lissy Tempelhof as Roswitha
- Lisa Macheiner as Ministerin
- Hannes W. Braun as Erster befrakter Herr
- Karl-Helge Hofstadt as Zweiter befrakter Herr
- Blanche Kommerell
