= Disgrace (1929 film) =

1929 film

- Directed by: Josef Medeotti-Bohác
- Written by: Gernot Bock-Stieber
- Starring: Jindrich Lhoták; Carl de Vogt; Ita Rina
- Cinematography: Georg Krause
- Production companies: Koop-Film; Starfilm
- Distributed by: Starfilm
- Release date: 13 December 1929
- Countries: Czechoslovakia; Germany
- Languages: Silent; Czech/German intertitles

Disgrace (Czech: Hanba, German: Die Schande) is a 1929 Czech-German silent film directed by Josef Medeotti-Bohác and starring Jindrich Lhoták, Carl de Vogt and Ita Rina.

The film's art direction was by Alois Mecera.

== Cast ==
- Jindrich Lhoták as Lukas
- Carl de Vogt as JUDr. Holan
- Ita Rina as Marta Holanová
- Jindrich Slovák as JUDr. Cejka
- Ella Voldánová as Mrs. Zatecká
- Ella Nollová as Emma
- Jan W. Speerger as Jakub
- Hans Eckert as Pavel Lacina
- Máňa Ženíšková as Olga Kustková
- Jirí Sedlácek as Young Dandy
- Leon Ratom as Hadácek
- Sasa Dobrovolná as Poor Woman
- Robert Ford as Bar Guest
- Bonda Szynglarski as Bar Guest

== Bibliography ==
- Sergio Grmek Germani. La meticcia di fuoco: oltre il continente Balcani. Lindau, 2000.
