= Günther Ballier =

German actor

- Born: 18 October 1900; Berlin, German Empire
- Died: 20 April 1980 (aged 79); East Berlin, East Germany
- Occupation: Actor
- Years active: 1933-1975

Günther Ballier (18 October 1900 – 20 April 1980) was a German actor. He appeared in more than 80 films and television shows between 1933 and 1975.

== Selected filmography ==
- The Country Schoolmaster (1933)
- What Am I Without You (1934)
- The Higher Command (1935)
- The Court Concert (1936)
- The Man Who Was Sherlock Holmes (1937)
- The Coral Princess (1937)
- The Secret Lie (1938)
- Drei Unteroffiziere (1939)
- Escape in the Dark (1939)
- Men Are That Way (1939)
- Attack on Baku (1942)
- The Old Boss (1942)
- When the Young Wine Blossoms (1943)
- Melody of a Great City (1943)
- The Call of the Sea (1951)
- Effi Briest (1971)
