= Sebastian Wolf (artist) =

- Born: 13 March 1989 (age 36); Altdöbern, Germany (fmr. GDR)
- Education: Berlin University of the Arts; Tama Art University; Bauhaus University; Nagoya Zokei University
- Occupations: Media Artist; Creative Technologist
- Known for: Kinetic art, Light art, Sculpture, Installation
- Website: einsdreidrei.com

Sebastian Wolf (born 1989) is a German Media artist and designer. In his work he explores "novel technologies and their inherent aesthetic and emotional potential" through interactive kinetic and light installations, usually incorporating natural elements. He lives and works in Berlin.

== Early life and education ==
Wolf holds a BFA in Media Art from Bauhaus University and a postgraduate degree in New Media from Berlin University of the Arts where he studied under Professor Joachim Sauter. He also studied Art & Media at Tama Art University as well as Contemporary Art at Nagoya Zokei University in Japan.

== Work ==
Wolf's work has been shown internationally, most notably at the National Museum of Emerging Science and Innovation, Tokyo, the Center for Art and Media Karlsruhe and frequently at the Ars Electronica Festival, Linz. Other exhibitions include the European Media Art Festival, re:publica, transmediale, and Scopitone Festival.

In 2016 he received the Zebrastraat New Technological Art Award for his work "Brume", a sculpture entirely made of ultralight mist. For his 2019 work "drawhearts", in which a machine utilizes vapour to produce ephemeral hand-drawn heart shapes on a pane of glass, he has been awarded the 2020 New Face Award (Art Division) of the 23rd Japan Media Arts Festival.
