= List of German films of 1937 =

This is a list of the most notable films produced in the Cinema of Germany in 1937.

== A–L ==
Title	Director	Cast	Genre	Notes
Adventure in Warsaw	Carl Boese	Georg Alexander, Paul Klinger, Richard Romanowsky	Comedy	Co-production with Poland. Polish version also released.
Alarm in Peking	Herbert Selpin	Gustav Fröhlich, Leny Marenbach, Herbert Hübner	Adventure	
Another World	Marc Allégret, Alfred Stöger	Käthe Gold, Karl Ludwig Diehl, Franz Schafheitlin	Drama	Co-production with France
Autobus S	Heinz Hille	Hermann Speelmans, Carsta Löck, Günther Lüders	Comedy	
Ball at the Metropol	Frank Wisbar	Heinrich George, Heinz von Cleve, Hilde Weissner	Drama	
The Beaver Coat	Jürgen von Alten	Heinrich George, Sabine Peters, Ida Wüst	Comedy	
The Broken Jug	Gustav Ucicky	Emil Jannings, Friedrich Kayßler, Thea von Harbou	Historical comedy	
Capers	Gustaf Gründgens	Gustaf Gründgens, Marianne Hoppe, Fita Benkhoff	Comedy	
Carousel	Alwin Elling	Marika Rökk, Georg Alexander, Paul Henckels	Musical	
Cause for Divorce	Carl Lamac	Anny Ondra, Jack Trevor, Paul Hörbiger	Comedy drama	Co-production with Czechoslovakia
The Chief Witness	Georg Jacoby	Iván Petrovich, Sybille Schmitz, Sabine Peters	Crime drama	
The Citadel of Warsaw	Fritz Peter Buch	Lucie Höflich, Werner Hinz, Viktoria von Ballasko	Drama	
The Coral Princess	Victor Janson	Iván Petrovich, Hilde Sessak, Ita Rina	Comedy	
Dangerous Crossing	Robert A. Stemmle	Gustav Fröhlich, Heli Finkenzeller, Otto Wernicke	Crime	
Dangerous Game	Erich Engel	Jenny Jugo, Harry Liedtke, Karl Martell	Comedy	
Daphne and the Diplomat	Robert A. Stemmle	Karin Hardt, Gerda Maurus, Hans Nielsen	Comedy	
The Daughter of the Samurai	Arnold Fanck, Mansaku Itami	Setsuko Hara, Ruth Eweler, Sessue Hayakawa	Drama	Co-production with Japan
Diamonds	Eduard von Borsody	Hansi Knoteck, Viktor Staal, Hilde Körber	Mystery	
Don't Promise Me Anything	Wolfgang Liebeneiner	Luise Ullrich, Viktor de Kowa, Heinrich George	Comedy	
An Enemy of the People	Hans Steinhoff	Heinrich George, Herbert Hübner, Carsta Löck	Drama	
Fanny Elssler	Paul Martin	Lilian Harvey, Willy Birgel, Rolf Moebius	Historical	
Fridericus	Johannes Meyer	Otto Gebühr, Hilde Körber, Lil Dagover	Historical	
Gasparone	Georg Jacoby	Marika Rökk, Johannes Heesters, Oskar Sima	Musical	
Gewitterflug zu Claudia	Erich Waschneck	Willy Fritsch, Jutta Freybe, Olga Chekhova	Crime	Stormy Flight to Claudia
A Girl from the Chorus	Carl Lamac	Anny Ondra, Viktor Staal, Ursula Grabley	Comedy	
The Glass Ball	Peter Stanchina	Albrecht Schoenhals, Sabine Peters, Hilde von Stolz	Drama	
Gordian the Tyrant	Fred Sauer	Weiß Ferdl, Paul Richter, Michael von Newlinsky	Comedy	
The Grey Lady	Erich Engels	Hermann Speelmans, Trude Marlen, Elisabeth Wendt	Mystery	
La Habanera	Douglas Sirk	Zarah Leander, Ferdinand Marian, Karl Martell	Drama	
His Best Friend	Harry Piel	Harry Piel, Henry Lorenzen, Lissy Arna	Crime	
The Hound of the Baskervilles	Carl Lamac	Peter Voss, Fritz Odemar, Fritz Rasp	Mystery	
The Irresistible Man	Géza von Bolváry	Anny Ondra, Hans Söhnker, Erika von Thellmann	Comedy	
Land of Love	Reinhold Schünzel	Albert Matterstock, Gusti Huber, Valerie von Martens	Romance	
Love Can Lie	Heinz Helbig	Karl Ludwig Diehl, Dorothea Wieck, Jutta Freybe	Romance	

== L–Z ==
Title	Director	Cast	Genre	Notes
The Man Who Was Sherlock Holmes	Karl Hartl	Hans Albers, Heinz Rühmann, Marieluise Claudius	Mystery comedy	
Madame Bovary	Gerhard Lamprecht	Pola Negri, Aribert Wäscher, Ferdinand Marian	Historical	
Mädchen für alles	Carl Boese	Grethe Weiser, Ralph Arthur Roberts, Ellen Frank	Comedy	A Girl for Everything
Men Without a Fatherland	Herbert Maisch	Willy Fritsch, Maria von Tasnady, Willy Birgel	Drama	
Meiseken	Hans Deppe	Josef Eichheim, Susi Lanner, Oskar Sima	Drama	
The Model Husband	Wolfgang Liebeneiner	Heinz Rühmann, Leny Marenbach, Hans Söhnker	Comedy	
Mother Song	Carmine Gallone	Beniamino Gigli, Maria Cebotari, Hans Moser	Musical drama	Co-production with Italy
My Friend Barbara	Fritz Kirchhoff	Grethe Weiser, Paul Hoffmann, Ingeborg von Kusserow	Comedy	
My Son the Minister	Veit Harlan	Hans Brausewetter, Heli Finkenzeller, Françoise Rosay	Comedy	
Not a Word About Love	Alwin Elling	Ellen Schwanneke, Rolf Wanka, Richard Romanowsky	Comedy	Co-production with Czechoslovakia
Operation Michael	Karl Ritter	Heinrich George, Mathias Wieman, Willy Birgel	War	
Ride to Freedom	Karl Hartl	Willy Birgel, Ursula Grabley, Viktor Staal	Historical	
The Ruler	Veit Harlan	Emil Jannings, Hilde Körber, Marianne Hoppe	Drama	
Seven Slaps	Paul Martin	Lilian Harvey, Willy Fritsch, Alfred Abel	Comedy	
Signal in the Night	Richard Schneider-Edenkoben	Sybille Schmitz, Inge List, Hannes Stelzer	War drama	
Silence in the Forest	Hans Deppe	Hansi Knoteck, Paul Richter, Gustl Gstettenbaur	Drama	
Such Great Foolishness	Carl Froelich	Paula Wessely, Rudolf Forster, Hilde Wagener	Drama	
Talking About Jacqueline	Werner Hochbaum	Wera Engels, Albrecht Schoenhals, Sabine Peters	Comedy drama	
Tango Notturno	Fritz Kirchhoff	Pola Negri, Albrecht Schoenhals, Elisabeth Flickenschildt	Drama	
To New Shores	Douglas Sirk	Zarah Leander, Willy Birgel, Viktor Staal	Melodrama	
Truxa	Hans H. Zerlett	La Jana, Hannes Stelzer, Mady Rahl	Drama	
The Vagabonds	Karel Lamac	Paul Hörbiger, Lucie Englisch, Gretl Theimer	Musical comedy	
The Voice of the Heart	Karlheinz Martin	Beniamino Gigli, Geraldine Katt, Ferdinand Marian	Drama	
The Ways of Love Are Strange	Hans H. Zerlett	Karl Ludwig Diehl, Olga Tschechowa, Karin Hardt	Drama	
When Women Keep Silent	Fritz Kirchhoff	Johannes Heesters, Hansi Knoteck Fita Benkhoff	Comedy	
Woman's Love—Woman's Suffering	Augusto Genina	Magda Schneider, Iván Petrovich, Oskar Sima	Drama	
The Yellow Flag	Gerhard Lamprecht	Hans Albers, Olga Chekhova, Dorothea Wieck	Drama	

== Documentaries ==
Title	Director	Cast	Genre	Notes
Alles Leben ist Kampf	Herbert Gerdes		Propaganda documentary	All Life Is Struggle; advocates involuntary sterilization of the disabled and those with hereditary diseases.
Bergsteiger in den Allgäuer Alpen: Teil 1 - Aufstieg	Norman Dix		documentary	
Bergsteiger in den Allgäuer Alpen: Teil 2 - Abstieg	Norman Dix		documentary	
Blaue Jungens am Rhein	Fritz Heydenreich, Nicholas Kaufmann		documentary	
Bojarenhochzeit	Johannes Guter		documentary	
Deutsche Siege in drei Erdteilen	Wolfgang Staudte		documentary	
Durch Kampf und Sieg			documentary	
Fern vom Land der Ahnen	Gerhard Huttula		documentary	
Festliches Nürnberg	Hans Weidemann			Festive Nuremberg; 21 minute compilation of footage from the 1936 and 37 Nazi Party Congresses
Fuer Uns!			documentary	
Helden der Küste	Walter Ruttmann		documentary	
Juden ohne Maske	Walter Böttcher, Leo von der Schmiede			The Jews Unmasked; 36 min Anti-Semitic documentary propaganda film
Kalt..., kälter... am kältesten... Ein Film von der Erzeugung tiefer Temperaturen	Martin Rikli		documentary	
Kampf um Raum und Zeit	Johannes Guter		documentary	
Mannesmann - Ein Film der Mannesmannröhren-Werke	Walter Ruttmann		documentary	
Mussolini in Deutschland		Benito Mussolini and Adolf Hitler	documentary propaganda	Mussolini in Germany; 31-minute film about Benito Mussolini's September 1937 visit to Munich
Mysterium des Lebens	Herta Jülich, Ulrich K.T. Schultz		documentary	
9. Reichsparteitag der NSDAP vom 6.-13. September			documentary propaganda	Available online here
Röntgenstrahlen	Martin Rikli		documentary	
Siemens - Die Welt der Elektrotechnik	Ulrich Kayser		documentary	
Das Sinnesleben der Pflanzen	Wolfram Junghans, Ulrich K.T. Schultz		documentary	
So ist Mexiko	Hubert Schonger		documentary	
Vom Uhu und anderen Gesichtern der Nacht	Wolfram Junghans, Ulrich K.T. Schultz		documentary	
Von Zeppelin 1 bis LZ 130 - Die Biographie eines deutschen Genies	Walter Jerven		documentary	
Wir bieten Schach der Weltmacht Baumwolle	Ulrich Kayser		documentary	

== Shorts ==
Title	Director	Cast	Genre	Notes
Huiii!	Wolfgang Kaskeline		animation	
Die Postkutsche				This was the first experimental short movie in Agfacolor. It was shot on 35 mm reversal film.
Der rechte Weg			animation	
The Seven Ravens	Ferdinand and Hermann Diehl		Animated, fantasy	
Die Schlacht um Miggershausen	Georg Woelz		animation	
Waardige vertegenwoordiging	Hans Fischerkoesen		animation	
Opfer der Vergangenheit. Die Sünde wider Blut und Rasse.	Gernot Bock-Stieber	Anonymous victims of various illness.	Nazi propaganda film	Victims of the Past. The Sin against Blood and Race. This film was shown in every cinema in Germany.
Weltraumschiff 1 startet...	Anton Kutter		Science fiction	
