= List of German films of 1935 =

This is a list of the most notable films produced in the Cinema of Germany in 1935.

== A–L ==
Title	Director	Cast	Genre	Notes
Amphitryon	Reinhold Schünzel	Willy Fritsch, Paul Kemp, Käthe Gold	Musical	Based on Greek mythology
An Ideal Husband	Herbert Selpin	Brigitte Helm, Sybille Schmitz, Georg Alexander	Comedy	
April, April!	Douglas Sirk	Albrecht Schoenhals, Carola Höhn, Erhard Siedel	Comedy	
Artist Love	Fritz Wendhausen	Wolfgang Liebeneiner, Olga Chekhova, Harald Paulsen	Drama	
Asew	Phil Jutzi	Fritz Rasp, Olga Chekhova, Hilde von Stolz	Thriller	
The Bird Seller	E.W. Emo	Maria Andergast, Wolf Albach-Retty, Lil Dagover	Musical	
The Blonde Carmen	Victor Janson	Mártha Eggerth, Wolfgang Liebeneiner, Leo Slezak	Musical	
Blood Brothers	Johann Alexander Hübler-Kahla	Brigitte Horney, Carl Esmond, Attila Hörbiger	Drama	
The Cat in the Bag	Richard Eichberg	Magda Schneider, Wolf Albach-Retty, Theo Lingen	Comedy	Co-production with France
Demon of the Himalayas	Andrew Marton	Gustav Diessl, Erika Dannhoff, Günter Oskar Dyhrenfurth	Adventure	Co-production with Switzerland
The Devil in the Bottle	Heinz Hilpert, Raoul Ploquin	Käthe von Nagy, Pierre Blanchar, Gina Manès	Drama	French-language version
Dreams of Love	Heinz Hille	Franz Herterich, Olga Chekhova, Erika Dannhoff	Historical	Co-production with Hungary
Ein Falscher Fuffziger	Carl Boese			A Two-Face
Every Day Isn't Sunday	Walter Janssen	Adele Sandrock, Wolfgang Liebeneiner, Carola Höhn	Comedy	
Everything for a Woman	Alfred Abel	Gustav Diessl, Charlotte Susa, Harry Frank	Drama	
The Fight with the Dragon	Franz Seitz	Adele Sandrock, Joe Stöckel, Lucie Englisch	Comedy	
The Foolish Virgin	Richard Schneider-Edenkoben	Rolf Wanka, Erika von Thellmann, Paul Bildt	Comedy	
Forget Me Not	Augusto Genina	Beniamino Gigli, Magda Schneider, Kurt Vespermann	Drama	Remade in Britain the following year
Fresh Wind from Canada	Erich Holder	Max Gülstorff, Dorit Kreysler, Paul Hörbiger	Comedy	
Frisians in Peril	Peter Hagen	Friedrich Kayßler, Jessie Vihrog, Valéry Inkijinoff	Drama	anti-Communist Propaganda film
Fruit in the Neighbour's Garden	Erich Engels	Karl Valentin, Liesl Karlstadt, Theo Shall	Comedy	
The Girl from the Marsh Croft	Douglas Sirk	Hansi Knoteck, Ellen Frank, Eduard von Winterstein	Drama	
The Green Domino	Herbert Selpin	Brigitte Horney, Karl Ludwig Diehl, Theodor Loos	Drama	French-language version also produced.
The Gypsy Baron	Karl Hartl	Anton Walbrook, Hansi Knoteck, Fritz Kampers	Musical	
Hangmen, Women and Soldiers	Johannes Meyer	Hans Albers, Charlotte Susa, Jack Trevor	Drama	
Hermine and the Seven Upright Men	Frank Wisbar	Heinrich George, Karin Hardt, Albert Lieven	Drama	
Hero for a Night	Martin Fric	Vlasta Burian, Betty Bird, Theo Lingen	Comedy	Co-production with Czechoslovakia
The Higher Command	Gerhard Lamprecht	Lil Dagover, Karl Ludwig Diehl, Heli Finkenzeller	Historical	
Hundred Days	Franz Wenzler	Werner Krauss, Gustaf Gründgens, Eduard von Winterstein	Historical	Co-production with Italy
I Love All the Women	Carl Lamac	Jan Kiepura, Lien Deyers, Theo Lingen	Comedy	
I Was Jack Mortimer	Carl Froelich	Anton Walbrook, Sybille Schmitz, Eugen Klöpfer	Thriller	
If It Were Not for Music	Carmine Gallone	Paul Hörbiger, Willi Schaeffers, Ida Wüst	Drama	
Joan of Arc	Gustav Ucicky	Angela Salloker, Gustaf Gründgens, Heinrich George, René Deltgen	Historical	
Lady Windermere's Fan	Heinz Hilpert	Lil Dagover, Walter Rilla, Fritz Odemar	Comedy	
The King's Prisoner	Carl Boese	Michael Bohnen, Paul Kemp, Susi Lanner	Historical comedy	
Die klugen Frauen	Jacques Feyder	Paul Hartmann, Charlott Daudert, Albert Lieven	Historical	French-language version also produced.
Knockout	Carl Lamac, Hans H. Zerlett	Anny Ondra, Max Schmeling, Edith Meinhard	Sports	
Last Stop	E. W. Emo	Paul Hörbiger, Hans Moser, Josefine Dora	Comedy	
Lessons in Love	Carl Hoffmann	Luise Ullrich, Paul Hörbiger, Lee Parry	Historical comedy	

== M–Z ==
Title	Director	Cast	Genre	Notes
Make Me Happy	Arthur Robison	Julia Serda, Albert Lieven, Harald Paulsen	Musical comedy	
The Man with the Paw	Rudolf van der Noss	Paul Wegener, Rose Stradner, Johannes Riemann	Crime drama	
Mazurka	Willi Forst	Pola Negri, Paul Hartmann, Albrecht Schoenhals	Drama	
Miracle of Flight	Heinz Paul	Ernst Udet, Jürgen Ohlsen, Käthe Haack	Drama	
My Life for Maria Isabella	Erich Waschneck	Viktor de Kowa, Maria Andergast, Peter Voß	Drama	
A Night of Change	Hans Deppe	Gustav Fröhlich, Heinrich George, Rose Stradner	Drama	
A Night on the Danube	Carl Boese	Wolfgang Liebeneiner, Dorit Kreysler, Gustav Waldau	Comedy	
The Old and the Young King	Hans Steinhoff	Emil Jannings, Werner Hinz, Marieluise Claudius	Historical drama	
One Too Many on Board	Gerhard Lamprecht	Lída Baarová, Albrecht Schoenhals, René Deltgen	Drama	
Peter, Paul and Nanette	Erich Engels	Hermann Thimig, Hans Junkermann, Hilde Krüger	Comedy	
Pillars of Society	Douglas Sirk	Heinrich George, Maria Krahn, Albrecht Schoenhals	Drama	
The Private Life of Louis XIV	Carl Froelich	Renate Müller, Eugen Klöpfer, Maly Delschaft	Historical	
Punks Arrives from America	Karlheinz Martin	Attila Hörbiger, Lien Deyers, Ralph Arthur Roberts, Sybille Schmitz	Comedy	
Pygmalion	Erich Engel	Jenny Jugo, Gustaf Gründgens, Anton Edthofer	Comedy	
The Red Rider	Rolf Randolf	Iván Petrovich, Camilla Horn, Friedrich Ulmer	Drama	
Regine	Erich Waschneck	Luise Ullrich, Anton Walbrook, Olga Chekhova	Drama	
The Royal Waltz	Herbert Maisch	Paul Hörbiger, Curd Jürgens, Carola Höhn	Music	
The Saint and Her Fool	Hans Deppe, Paul May	Friedrich Ulmer, Hansi Knoteck, Hans Stüwe	Drama	
The Schimeck Family	E.W. Emo	Hans Moser, Käthe Haack, Hilde Schneider	Comedy	
The Secret of Woronzeff	Arthur Robison	Jean Murat, Brigitte Helm, Madeleine Ozeray	Drama	French-language film
Sergeant Schwenke	Carl Froelich	Gustav Fröhlich, Marianne Hoppe, Karl Dannemann	Drama	
She and the Three	Victor Janson	Gustav Waldau, Charlotte Susa, Hubert von Meyerinck	Comedy	
Stradivari	Géza von Bolváry	Gustav Fröhlich, Sybille Schmitz, Harald Paulsen	Drama	
Streak of Steel	Franz Wenzler	Karl Ludwig Diehl, Dorothea Wieck, Friedl Haerlin	Sports	
The Student of Prague	Arthur Robison	Anton Walbrook, Theodor Loos, Dorothea Wieck	Horror	
Trouble Backstairs	Veit Harlan	Henny Porten, Else Elster, Rotraut Richter	Comedy	
The Valiant Navigator	Hans Deppe	Paul Kemp, Lucie Englisch, Harald Paulsen	Comedy	
The Valley of Love	Hans Steinhoff	Käthe Gold, Richard Romanowsky, Marieluise Claudius	Comedy	
Variety	Nicolas Farkas	Annabella, Hans Albers, Attila Hörbiger	Drama	Co-production with France
Victoria	Carl Hoffmann	Luise Ullrich, Mathias Wieman, Alfred Abel	Drama	
Winter Night's Dream	Géza von Bolváry	Magda Schneider, Wolf Albach-Retty, Richard Romanowsky	Comedy	
The Young Count	Carl Lamac	Anny Ondra, Hans Söhnker, Fritz Odemar	Comedy	Co-production with Czechoslovakia

== Documentaries ==
Title	Director	Cast	Genre	Notes
Briefe fliegen über den Ozean	Fritz Kallab		documentary	
Deutschland kreuz und quer	Ulrich Kayser		documentary	
Die Gemeindeschwester der Großstadt	Gertrud David		documentary	
Hände am Werk – Ein Lied von deutscher Arbeit			documentary	
Helfende Liebe in der Großstadt	Gertrud David		documentary	
Heilkräfte der Nordsee	Ulrich Kayser		documentary	
Hopfenanbau			documentary	
Im Aufmarschgebiet der abessinischen Armee	Martin Rikli			In the Staging Ground of the Abyssinian Army; Related to the Second Italo-Ethiopian War (?)
Metall des Himmels	Walter Ruttmann			documentary
Das Stahltier	Willy Zielke		Documentary	The Steel Animal
Stuttgart	Walter Ruttmann			documentary
Stadt Stuttgart – 100. Cannstätter Volksfest	Walter Ruttmann			documentary
Thüringen. Land und Leute und ihre Arbeit	Werner Funck			documentary
Wir blenden auf!	Kurt Engel		documentary	
Tag der Freiheit: Unsere Wehrmacht	Leni Riefenstahl		Propaganda	Day of Freedom – Our Wehrmacht; propaganda film about the 1935 Nazi Party Congress
Triumph des Willens	Leni Riefenstahl		Propaganda	Triumph of the Will; propaganda film about the 1934 Nazi Party Congress

== Shorts ==
Title	Director	Cast	Genre	Notes
Achte mir auf Gakeki	Alwin Elling	Hermann Braun, Erich Fiedler, Heinz Flügge		Short film
Das blaue Wunder	Hans Fischerkoesen		animation	
Die Bremer Stadtmusikanten	Ferdinand Diehl		animation	
Das Erbe	Carl Hartmann		Short	The Inheritance, propaganda for euthanasia and sterilization
Galathea: Das lebende Marmorbild	Lotte Reiniger		animation	
Lichtkonzert No. 2	Oskar Fischinger		Animation	
Kalif Storch	Lotte Reiniger		animation	
Eine kleine Königstragödie	Richard Groschopp		animation	
Der kleine Schornsteinfeger	Lotte Reiniger		animation	
Komposition in Blau	Oskar Fischinger		Animation	Composition in Blue; In Gasparcolor
Muratti privat	Oskar Fischinger		Animation	
Nordmark voran!	Richard Garms		Animation	
Papageno	Lotte Reiniger		Animation	
