= List of science fiction films of the 1930s =

This is a list of science fiction films that premiered between 1 January 1930 and 31 December 1939. In Phil Hardy's book Science Fiction (1983), the 1930s are described as a period where both science fiction literature and cinema were "in turmoil", and that by examining films of the decade, "it is clear that Science Fiction, in no sense, can be seen as an ongoing genre in the thirties".

In the United States, films would use a science fiction plot device or character such as a mad scientist, but more closely resembled contemporary genres like horror, thriller and detective films. The films enhanced other genres such as melodrama (Six Hours to Live), Westerns (The Phantom Empire), and most predominantly horror films, such as Frankenstein or Dr. Jekyll and Mr. Hyde. Towards the middle of the decade, science fiction was prominent in low-budget Poverty Row films and film series. European films such as End of the World, F.P.1 antwortet nicht, and Things to Come continued the line of prophetic speculation of Fritz Lang's film Metropolis. Towards the end of the 1930s, as the political climate was changing in Europe, films such as Bila Nemoc used science fiction elements to imagine the horrors of World War II.

Few films from the era have been nominated or won awards; these include Fredric March winning an Academy Award for Best Actor for Dr. Jekyll and Mr. Hyde, while the film received nominations for best writing and cinematography. Gilbert Kurland was nominated for Best Sound Recording for Bride of Frankenstein

== List ==
Science fiction films of the 1930s
1930
Title	Director	Release	Primary cast	Production country	Notes	Ref(s)
The Voice from the Sky	Ben F. Wilson	1 January 1930	Wally Wales, Neva Gerber, Robert D. Walker	United States	Film serial with 10 chapters	
Alraune	Richard Oswald	2 March 1930	Brigitte Helm, Albert Bassermann, Harald Paulsen	Germany		
Just Imagine	David Butler	21 November 1930	El Brendel, Maureen O'Sullivan, Marjorie White	United States		
1931
Title	Director	Release	Primary cast	Production country	Notes	Ref(s)
End of the World	Abel Gance	23 January 1931	Colette Darfeuil, Abel Gance, Victor Francen	France		
Frankenstein	James Whale	21 November 1931	Colin Clive, Boris Karloff, Mae Clarke	United States		
Dr. Jekyll and Mr. Hyde	Rouben Mamoulian	31 December 1931	Fredric March, Miriam Hopkins, Rose Hobart	United States		
1932
Title	Director	Release	Primary cast	Production country	Notes	Ref(s)
L'Atlantide	G. W. Pabst	8 June 1932	Brigitte Helm	Germany, France		
Doctor X	Michael Curtiz	3 August 1932	Lionel Atwill, Fay Wray, Lee Tracy	United States	Science fiction horror	
Chandu the Magician	Marcel Varnel, William C. Menzies	18 September 1932	Edmund Lowe, Irene Ware, Bela Lugosi	United States		
6 Hours to Live	William Dieterle	16 October 1932	Warner Baxter, Miriam Jordan, John Boles	United States		
F.P.1 antwortet nicht	Karl Hartl	22 December 1932	Hans Albers, Sybille Schmitz, Paul Hartmann	Germany		
Island of Lost Souls	Erle C. Kenton	23 December 1932	Charles Laughton, Richard Arlen, Leila Hyams	United States		
1933
Title	Director	Release	Primary cast	Production country	Notes	Ref(s)
Men Must Fight	Edgar Selwyn	17 February 1933	Diana Wynyard, Lewis Stone, Phillips Holmes	United States		
It's Great to Be Alive	Alfred L. Werker	2 June 1933	Raúl Roulien, Gloria Stuart, Edna May Oliver	United States		
Deluge	Felix E. Feist	18 August 1933	Peggy Shannon, Sidney Blackmer, Lois Wilson	United States		
Ein Unsichtbarer geht durch die Stadt	Harry Piel	29 September 1933	Harry Piel, Fritz Odemar, Lissy Arna	Germany		
F.P.1 Doesn't Answer	Karl Hartl	22 December 1932	Conrad Veidt; Jill Esmond; Leslie Fenton	Germany		English version of 1932 German movie
The Invisible Man	James Whale	13 November 1933	Claude Rains, Gloria Stuart, William Harrigan	United States		
Der Tunnel "The Tunnel"	Kurt Bernhardt	27 October 1933	Paul Hartmann, Olly von Flint, Gustaf Gründgens	Germany	Multiple-language film	
Le Tunnel "The Tunnel"	Kurt Bernhardt	15 December 1933	Jean Gabin, Madeleine Renaud, Robert Le Vigan, Edmond Van Daële	France	Multiple-language film	
1934
Title	Director	Release	Primary cast	Production country	Notes	Ref(s)
Die Welt ohne Maske	Harry Piel	9 March 1934	Harry Piel, Kurt Vespermann, Annie Markart	Germany		
Gold	Karl Hartl	29 March 1934	Hans Albers, Brigitte Helm, Michael Bohnen	Germany		
The Vanishing Shadow	Lew Landers	13 April 1934	Onslow Stevens, Ada Ince, Walter Miller	United States	Film serial with 12 chapters	
Master of the World	Harry Piel	11 August 1934	Walter Janssen, Sybille Schmitz, Walter Franck	Germany		
Once in a New Moon	Anthony Kimmins	December 1934	Derrick de Marney, Vernon Kelso, John Clements	United Kingdom		
1935
Title	Director	Release	Primary cast	Production country	Notes	Ref(s)
The Lost City	Harry Revier	14 February 1935	William "Stage" Boyd, Kane Richmond, Claudia Dell	United States	Film serial with 12 chapters	
The Phantom Empire	Otto Brower, B. Reeves Eason	23 February 1935	Gene Autry, Frankie Darro, Betsy King Ross	United States	Film serial with 12 chapters	
Loss of Sensation	Alexandr Andriyevsky	17 April 1935	Sergey Vecheslov, Vladimir Gardin	Soviet Union		
Bride of Frankenstein	James Whale	22 April 1935	Boris Karloff, Colin Clive, Valerie Hobson	United States		
Air Hawks	Albert S. Rogell	7 May 1935	Ralph Bellamy, Tala Birell, Wiley Post	United States		
The Tunnel AKA Transatlantic Tunnel	Maurice Elvey	25 October 1935	Richard Dix, Leslie Banks, Madge Evans	United Kingdom	Multiple-language film	
1936
Title	Director	Release	Primary cast	Production country	Notes	Ref(s)
The Invisible Ray	Lambert Hillyer	20 January 1936	Boris Karloff, Bela Lugosi, Frances Drake	United States		
Kosmicheskiy reys (Cosmic Voyage)	Vassili Jouravlev	21 January 1936		Soviet Union		
Things to Come	William Cameron Menzies	20 February 1936	Raymond Massey, Cedric Hardwicke, Edward Chapman	United Kingdom		
The Walking Dead	Michael Curtiz	14 March 1936	Boris Karloff, Ricardo Cortez, Edmund Gwenn	United States		
Flash Gordon	Frederick Stephani	6 April 1936	Larry "Buster" Crabbe, Jean Rogers, Charles B. Middleton	United States	Film serial with 13 chapters	
Undersea Kingdom	B. Reeves Eason, Joseph Kane	30 May 1936	Ray "Crash" Corrigan, Lois Wilde	United States	Film serial with 12 chapters	
Ghost Patrol	Sam Newfield	3 August 1936	Tim McCoy, Claudia Dell, Walter Miller	United States		
The Man Who Changed His Mind	Robert Stevenson	11 September 1936	Boris Karloff, Anna Lee, John Loder	United Kingdom		
1937
Title	Director	Release	Primary cast	Production country	Notes	Ref(s)
Non-Stop New York	Robert Stevenson	13 September 1937	John Loder, Anna Lee, Francis L. Sullivan	United Kingdom		
Skeleton on Horseback	Hugo Haas	21 December 1937	Hugo Haas, Bedrich Karen, Zdenek Stephanek	Czechoslovakia		
1938
Title	Director	Release	Primary cast	Production country	Notes	Ref(s)
The Fighting Devil Dogs	William Witney, John English	28 May 1938	Lee Powell, Herman Brix, Eleanor Stewart, Montagu Love	United States	Film serial with 12 chapters	
Flash Gordon's Trip to Mars	Ford Beebe, Robert F. Hill	31 March 1938	Larry "Buster" Crabbe, Jean Rogers, Charles B. Middleton	United States	Film serial with 15 chapters	
Flight to Fame	C. C. Coleman Jr.	12 October 1938	Charles Farrell, Jacqueline Wells, Hugh Sothern	United States		
1939
Title	Director	Release	Primary cast	Production country	Notes	Ref(s)
The Phantom Creeps	Ford Beebe	7 January 1939	Bela Lugosi, Robert Kent, Dorothy Arnold	United States	Film serial with 12 chapters	
Son of Frankenstein	Rowland V. Lee	13 January 1939	Basil Rathbone, Boris Karloff, Bela Lugosi	United States		
Buck Rogers	Ford Beebe, Saul A. Goodkind	11 April 1939	Larry "Buster" Crabbe, Constance Moore, Jackie Moran	United States	Film serial with 12 chapters	
The Man They Could Not Hang	Nick Grinde	17 August 1939	Boris Karloff, Lorna Gray, Robert Wilcox	United States		
The Return of Doctor X	Vincent Sherman	23 November 1939	Humphrey Bogart, Rosemary Lane, Wayne Morris	United States		

== See also ==
- History of science fiction films

== Notes ==
=== References ===
- Bock, Hans-Michael, ed. (2009). The Concise Cinegraph. Berghahn Books. ISBN 978-1-57181-655-9.
- Bradley, Edwin M. (2005). The First Hollywood Sound Shorts, 1926–1931. McFarland. ISBN 1476606846.
- Cline, William C., ed. (1997). In the Nick of Time: Motion Picture Sound Serials. McFarland. ISBN 078640471X.
- Cusic, Don (2007). Gene Autry: His Life and Career. McFarland. ISBN 978-0786430611.
- Hardy, Phil, ed. (1984). Science Fiction. New York : Morrow. ISBN 0-688-00842-9.
- Hochscherf, Tobias, ed. (2011). British Science Fiction Film and Television: Critical Essays. McFarland. ISBN 978-0786484836.
- Johnston, Keith M. (2013). Science Fiction Film. Berg. ISBN 978-1847884787.
- Kinnard, Roy (1998). Science Fiction Serials. McFarland. ISBN 0786437456.
- Kinnard, Roy; Crnkovich, Tony; Vitone, R. J. (2008). The Flash Gordon Serials, 1936–1940. McFarland. ISBN 978-0786455003.
- Rainey, Buck (2015). Serials and Series: A World Filmography, 1912–1956. McFarland. ISBN 978-1476604480.
- Rhodes, Gary Don (1997). Lugosi: His Life in Films, on Stage, and in the Hearts of Horror Lovers. McFarland. ISBN 0786402571.
- Soister, John T. (2005). Of Gods and Monsters: A Critical Guide to Universal Studios' Science Fiction, Horror and Mystery Films, 1929–1939. McFarland. ISBN 1476604991.
