= The Secret of Woronzeff =

1935 film

- Directed by: André Beucler; Arthur Robison
- Written by: André Beucler; Arthur Robison; Walter Supper; Margot von Simpson (novel)
- Starring: Jean Murat; Brigitte Helm; Madeleine Ozeray
- Cinematography: Otto Baecker; Günther Rittau
- Music by: Hans-Otto Borgmann
- Production company: UFA
- Distributed by: ACE
- Release date: 1 February 1935
- Running time: 85 minutes
- Country: Germany
- Language: French

The Secret of Woronzeff (French: Le secret des Woronzeff) is a 1935 drama film directed by André Beucler and Arthur Robison and starring Jean Murat, Brigitte Helm and Madeleine Ozeray.

It was made by the German studio UFA as a French-language version of the company's 1934 film Count Woronzeff.

== Cast ==
- Jean Murat as Le prince Woronzeff
- Brigitte Helm as Diane
- Madeleine Ozeray as Nadia
- Vladimir Sokoloff as Petroff
- Marguerite Templey as La tante Adèle
- Gaston Dubosc as L'oncle Ivan
- Pierre Mingand as Le frère von Naydeck
- Guy Sloux
- Charles Redgie
- Marc-Hély
- Henry Bonvallet
- Raymond Aimos
- Jane Pierson
- Marguerite de Morlaye

== Bibliography ==
- Bock, Hans-Michael & Bergfelder, Tim. The Concise CineGraph. Encyclopedia of German Cinema. Berghahn Books, 2009.
