= F.P.1 =

1932 film

F.P.1 Antwortet Nicht
- Film poster for the German-language version of the film
- Directed by: Karl Hartl
- Screenplay by: Walter Reisch; Kurt Siodmak
- Based on: F.P.1. Antwortet Nicht by Kurt Siodmak
- Produced by: Erich Pommer
- Cinematography: Günther Rittau; Konstantin Tschet; Otto Baecker
- Edited by: Willy Zeyn jun
- Music by: Allan Gray
- Production company: Universum-Film AG
- Distributed by: UFA-Filmverleih
- Release date: 22 December 1932 (Berlin)
- Running time: 114 minutes
- Country: Germany
- Language: German

F.P.1 antwortet nicht (transl. F.P.1 Doesn't Answer) is a 1932 German film directed by Karl Hartl. The film was based on the 1931 novel of the same name by Kurt Siodmak. The plot concerns a permanent air station in the middle of the Atlantic Ocean. Multilingual versions of the film were developed, with one film each in German, French, and English filmed separately and with different casts. The film was shot in 1932 and premiered in Berlin late that year with English- and French-language versions premiering the next year.

== Plot ==
Lieutenant Droste wants to build an air station in the middle of the ocean to allow pilots on intercontinental flights to refuel and repair any damage to their aircraft. With the help of the pilot Ellissen, he manages to win the support of the Lennartz-Werke for the project. Ellissen, who has taken up with the owner's sister Claire Lennartz, shies away from marriage and seeks new adventure.

After two years, the platform has been installed in place and is ready for operation. During a storm, the radio connection to the platform is lost. The last noises heard were gunshots and screams. The weather clears and the best pilots immediately head for F.P.1. Ellissen, in a lovesick depression, is convinced by Claire to fly her to the platform. Immediately after touching down their plane receives rifle fire and subsequently rams a railing.

They find the crew of F.P.1 knocked out by gas deliberately released by a saboteur. Before chief engineer Damsky fled in a boat, he opened the ballast valves, causing a danger that F.P.1 will sink. Claire finds the badly injured Droste and takes care of him. Ellissen has to recognize that Claire is slipping away from him. After a short time, he pulls himself together and takes a plane out to get help. He sees a ship, parachutes from his plane, is taken aboard the ship, and calls for help via radio. A fleet of ships and planes are sent to rescue F.P.1.

== Cast ==
German-language cast

- Hans Albers as Ellissen
- Sybille Schmitz as Claire Lennartz
- Paul Hartmann: Kapitänleutnant Droste
- Peter Lorre as Bildreporter Jonny
- Hermann Speelmans as Chefingenieur Damsky
- Erik Ode as Konrad Lennartz
- Werner Schott as Matthias Lennartz
- Gustav Püttjer as Mann mit der Fistelstimme
- Georg John as Maschinist

French-language cast

- Charles Boyer as Ellissen
- Danièle Parola as Claire Lennartz
- Jean Murat as Capitaine Droste
- Marcel Vallée as Damsky, le saboteur
- Pierre Piérade as Le photographe

English-language cast

- Conrad Veidt as Maj. Ellissen
- Jill Esmond as Claire Lennartz
- Leslie Fenton as Capt. B.E. Droste
- Donald Calthrop as Sunshine, the Photographer
- George Merritt as Lubin
- William Freshman as Conrad Lennartz
- Nicholas Hannen as Matthias Lennartz

== Production ==
F.P.1. was based on the 1931 novel by Kurt Siodmak, F.P.1 antwortet nicht (transl. F.P.1 Does Not Answer). The film was shot in Berlin. Other parts of the set were filmed on platforms designed by Erik Kettlehut on the Baltic Sea island of Greifswalder Oie. The film was shot between 15 August 1932, and 15 December 1932.

Three versions of the film were made for international audiences: a German version titled F.P.1 antwortet nicht, a French version titled Î.F.1 ne répond plus and an English-language version titled F.P.1.

== Release ==
The German version of the film was released was shown on 22 December 1932, in Berlin at the Ufa-Palast am Zoo. The French-language version was shown in Paris on 24 February 1933.

The English-language version debuted in London in 1933 where it was released by Gaumont-British running at 74 minutes, over half an hour less than the German version. When Fox released the film in the United States it ran for 90 minutes. This was shown in the United Kingdom on 3 April 1933, and in New York on 15 September 1933. The English version (1933) was named "F.P.1 Doesnt Answer" on posters, but a different name "Secrets Of F.P.1" appears on the opening title cards.

The French version (1933) was named "I.F.1 Ne Répond Plus" (English "I.F.1 no longer responds").

== Reception ==
Reviewing the German-language version, Variety declared the film to be "UFA's greatest picture of this year" and found it to be "a success with regard to speed, continuity and cast of the leading femme role" and that photography and sound were "first class". Reviewing the French version, Variety called Charles Boyer "excellent" and said the film had an "Ordinary enough story but redeemed by wonderful photography and the thrills provided by trick machinery."

Reviewing the English-language version, Variety proclaimed it "well made with good photography and lighting, sound that is well recorded and generally good direction and acting. Picture falls short of best result partly because of the English accents of the players", and concluded that "It's a good English product but not yet competition with Hollywood on the finer points." Film Daily highly praised the film, stating that the production "have outdone anything of its kind that Hollywood has ever conceived", specifically praising the built floating island, and calling the plot "a powerful romance intertwined into a very realistic story, with a great series of climaxes" with "Superior photography". The Motion Picture Herald noted the "imaginative setting" and that set were "marvelously contrived [...] There is no lack of thrills in the serial shots and sequences showing the incursion of water and the desertion of the crew." Harrison's Reports declared it "a fairly good melodrama" with "ingenious and clever background" while noting that "the first half is slow, but the second half holds one in tense suspense."

== Legacy ==
Following F.P.1, Hans Albers and director Karl Hartl teamed up for Gold and The Man Who Was Sherlock Holmes (1936).

By 1933, a political joke referring to Adolf Hitler played on the title of the film: "P.G.1 antwortet nicht." (meaning "Parteigenosse 1 antwortet nicht," or "Party Member 1 doesn't answer.").

== See also ==
- List of films made in Weimar Germany
- Project Habakkuk
- Pykrete
