= Otto Hunte =

German production designer

- Born: 9 January 1881; Hamburg, Germany
- Died: 28 December 1960 (aged 79); Potsdam, East Germany
- Occupations: Production designer Art director Set decorator

Otto Hunte (9 January 1881 – 28 December 1960) was a German production designer, art director and set decorator. Hunte is considered one of the most important artists in the history of early German cinema, mainly for his set designs on the early silent movies of Fritz Lang. A working relationship with fellow designers Karl Vollbrecht and Erich Kettelhut defined his early career. Hunte's architectural designs are found in many of the period's most important films including Dr. Mabuse the Gambler, Die Nibelungen (1924), Metropolis (1927) and Der blaue Engel. Hunte subsequently worked as one of the leading set designers during the Nazi era. After World War II, he was employed by the East German DEFA studios.

== Selected filmography ==
- The Mistress of the World (1919)
- The Spiders (1919)
- The Wandering Image (1920)
- The Women of Gnadenstein (1921)
- The Passion of Inge Krafft (1921)
- The Indian Tomb (1921)
- Dr. Mabuse the Gambler (1922)
- Die Nibelungen (1924)
- Metropolis (1926)
- The Love of Jeanne Ney (1927)
- Spione (1928)
- Woman in the Moon (1929)
- The Blue Angel (1930)
- The Three from the Filling Station (1930)
- Hooray, It's a Boy! (1931)
- The Typist (1931)
- By a Nose (1931)
- The Private Secretary (1931)
- That's All That Matters (1931)
- The Four from Bob 13 (1932)
- The Tsar's Diamond (1932)
- I by Day, You by Night (1932)
- Modern Dowry (1932)
- Under False Flag (1932)
- A Door Opens (1933)
- The Country Schoolmaster (1933)
- The Star of Valencia (1933)
- Gold (1934)
- Love, Death and the Devil (1934)
- The English Marriage (1934)
- Make Me Happy (1935)
- The Devil in the Bottle (1935)
- The Green Domino (1935)
- City of Anatol (1936)
- Donogoo (1936)
- Donogoo Tonka (1936
- The Chief Witness (1937)
- Wells in Flames (1937)
- The Man Who Was Sherlock Holmes (1937)
- The Strange Monsieur Victor (1938)
- The Desert Song (1939)
- Man for Man (1939)
- Jud Süß (1940)
- Riding for Germany (1941)
- Attack on Baku (1941)
- An Old Heart Becomes Young Again (1943)
- Murderers Among Us (1946)
- Raid (1947)
- An Everyday Story (1948)
