= Winter in the Woods =

Winter in the Woods may refer to:

- Winter in the Woods (1936 film), a German drama film
- Winter in the Woods (1956 film), a German drama film, a remake of the above
