= Northern Lights (1938 film) =

1938 film

- Directed by: Herbert B. Fredersdorf
- Written by: Hans Leip; Herbert B. Fredersdorf
- Based on: Bären by Lars Hansen and Karl Holter
- Produced by: Ulrich Mohrbutter
- Starring: René Deltgen; Ferdinand Marian; Hilde Sessak
- Cinematography: Günther Rittau
- Edited by: Milo Harbich
- Music by: Herbert Windt
- Production company: UFA
- Distributed by: UFA
- Release date: 20 September 1938
- Running time: 97 minutes
- Country: Germany
- Language: German

Northern Lights (German: Nordlicht) is a 1938 German adventure film directed by Herbert B. Fredersdorf and starring René Deltgen, Ferdinand Marian and Hilde Sessak. It was shot at the Tempelhof Studios in Berlin and on location in Ålesund in Norway and the Grossglockner in the Austrian Alps. The film's sets were designed by the art director Carl Ludwig Kirmse.

== Synopsis ==
Norwegian fur trappers Halvard has been missing for two years after his ship didn't return home from a trip to Greenland. Assumed to be dead his former fiancée is now married to Olaf, but still haunted by grief for her lost lover. To prove to her that he is a man worth of her, Olaf signs up to go on an expedition to Greenland. Yet he finds himself on the same ship as Halvard who has turned up after all this time, and tension flares between the two rivals in love. When only Olaf returns from a confrontation with a polar bear, everyone suspects him of Halvard's murder.

== Cast ==
- René Deltgen as Olaf Hansen
- Ferdinand Marian as Halvard
- Hilde Sessak as Petra Hansen
- Otto Wernicke as Kaufmann Hansen
- Josef Sieber as Beitsar
- Fritz Kampers as Kaufmann Sörelund
- Karen Fredersdorf as Mutter Hansen
- Lotte Rausch as Andrea
- Christine Garden as Helga
- Friedrich Gnaß as Lappen-Nils
- Hans Zesch-Ballot as Staatsanwalt
- Werner Funck as Stenerson
- Fritz Hoopts as Erik
- Heinz Wemper as Sven
- Paul Schwed as Björn
- Eduard Bornträger as Pfarrer
- Friedrich Ettel as Kunde bei Hansen
- Alfred Pussert as Pelzverkäufer bei Hansen
- Eduard Wenck as Richter

== Bibliography ==
- Klaus, Ulrich J. Deutsche Tonfilme: Jahrgang 1938. Klaus-Archiv, 1988.
- Rentschler, Eric. The Ministry of Illusion: Nazi Cinema and Its Afterlife. Harvard University Press, 1996.
- Waldman, Harry. Nazi Films in America, 1933-1942. McFarland, 2008.
