= André Beucler =

Russian-born French journalist, novelist, screenwriter and film director (1898–1985)

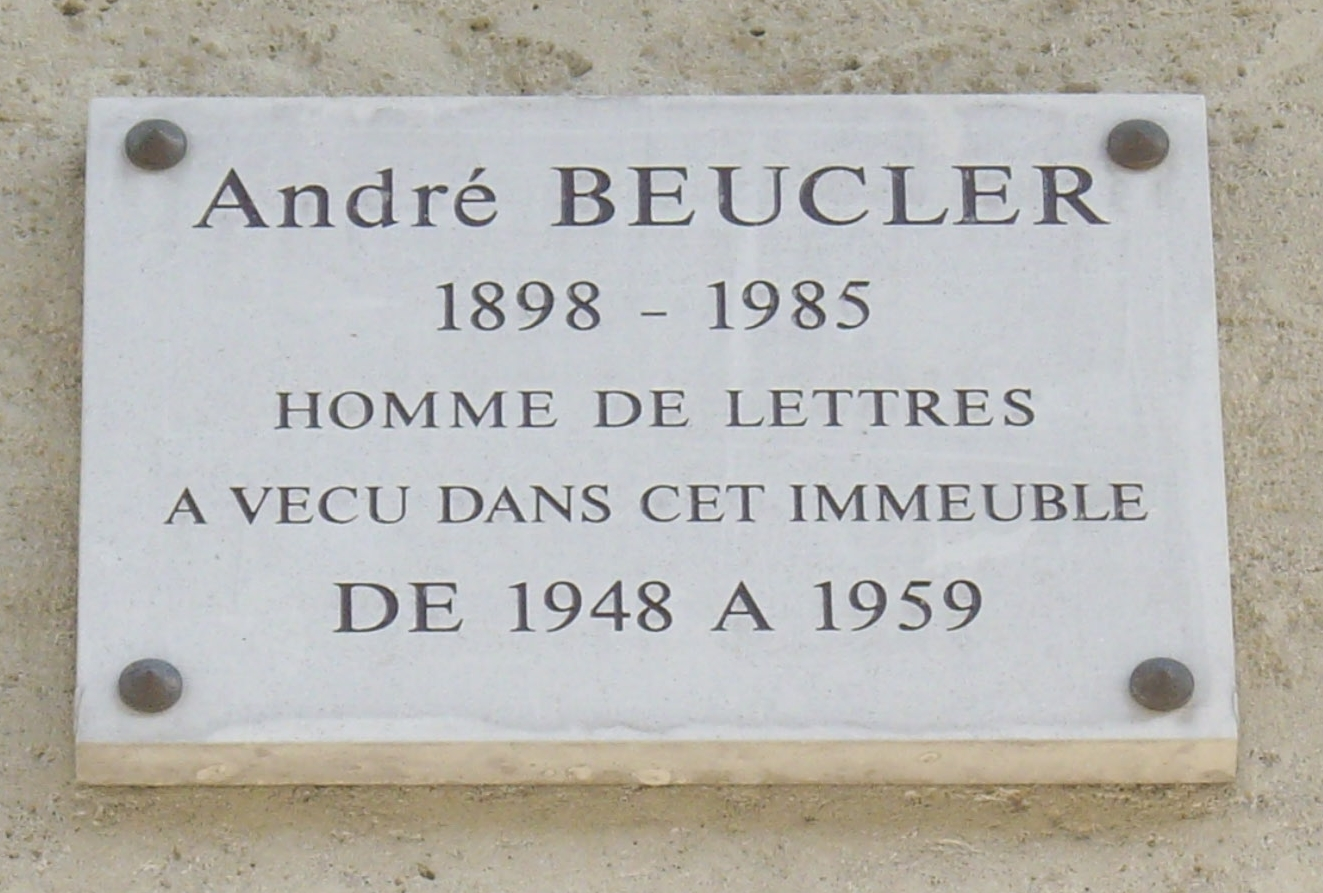
- Plaque on Beucler's former residence in Paris.
- Born: 24 February 1898; Saint Petersburg, Russian Empire
- Died: 26 February 1985 (aged 87); Nice, Alpes-Maritimes, France
- Occupations: Director, writer, journalist
- Years active: 1933–1948 (film)

André Beucler (1898–1985) was a Russian-born French journalist, novelist, screenwriter and film director. He was born in Saint Petersburg to a French father and grew up speaking Russian. During the 1930s, he worked on a number of films produced by L'Alliance Cinématographique Européenne, the French subsidiary of the German company UFA. He was awarded the SGDL Grand Prix for Literature in 1957.

== Selected filmography ==
- I.F.1 ne répond plus (1933)
- Goodbye, Beautiful Days (1933)
- Princesse Czardas (1934)
- Tambour battant (1934)
- The Secret of Woronzeff (1935)
- Nitchevo (1936)
- Lady Killer (1937)
- Bagarres (1948)

== Bibliography ==
- Cate, Curtis. André Malraux: A Biography. From International Publishing Corporation, 1997.
- Crisp, Colin. French Cinema—A Critical Filmography: Volume 1, 1929–1939. Indiana University Press, 2015.
- Pitts, Michael R. Thrills Untapped: Neglected Horror, Science Fiction and Fantasy Films, 1928–1936. McFarland, 2018.
- Tilburg, Patricia. Working Girls: Sex, Taste, and Reform in the Parisian Garment Trades, 1880–1919. Oxford University Press, 2019.
