= Trude Hesterberg =

German actress

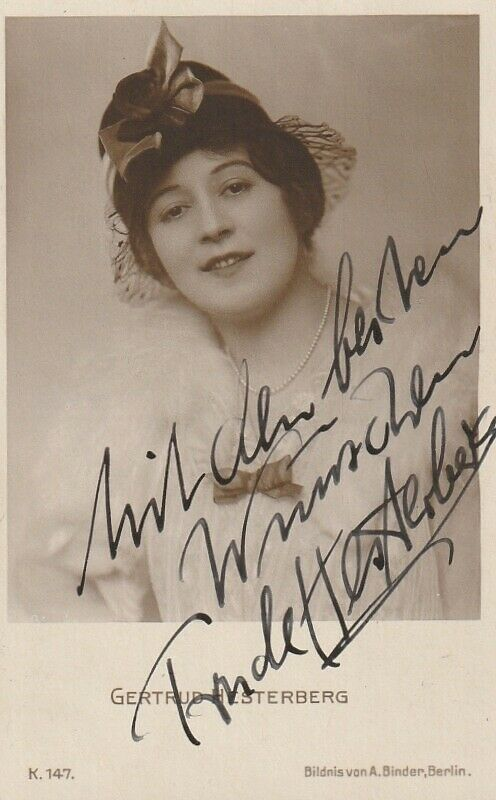
- Born: Gertrud Johanna Dorothea Helene Hesterberg; 2 May 1892; Berlin, German Empire
- Died: 31 August 1967 (aged 75); Munich, West Germany
- Occupation: Actress
- Years active: 1917–1964

Trude Hesterberg (2 May 1892 – 31 August 1967) was a German film actress. She appeared in 89 films between 1917 and 1964.

== Selected filmography ==
- Ein Schwerenöter (1916) – Liddy
- Die Eheschule (1917)
- Die Reise ins Jenseits (1917)
- The Rosentopf Case (1918) – Bella Spaketti, Tänzerin
- The Story of a Maid (1921) – Lia de Pau
- Fridericus Rex (1922–1923, part 1, 3) – Marquise von Pompadour
- Die Frau mit dem Etwas (1925)
- The Woman with That Certain Something (1925) – Zuschauerin imm Varieté
- Upstairs and Downstairs (1925) – Auguste, Mädchen für alles
- Manon Lescaut (1926) – Claire
- Circus Romanelli (1926) – Frau Direktor
- Maytime (1926) – Julia
- Madame Wants No Children (1926) – Elyane's mother
- White Slave Traffic (1927) – Meta Pohlmann
- Love Affairs (1927)
- The Imaginary Baron (1927) – Fränze
- The Vice of Humanity (1927) – Mrs. von Führing
- The Lorelei (1927)
- The Queen Was in the Parlour (1927) – Herzogin Xenia
- That Dangerous Age (1927) – Lilly seine Frau
- Two Under the Stars (1927) – Isabella, seine Frau
- When the Mother and the Daughter (1928)
- The Great Adventuress (1928) – Aunt Eulalie
- Honeymoon (1928)
- Two Red Roses (1928) – Eugenie, seine Frau
- The Little Slave (1928) – Meta Strippe
- Strauss Is Playing Today (1928) – Trampusch
- Flucht vor Blond (1928)
- Revolt in the Batchelor's House (1929) – Die lustige Witwe
- The Convict from Istanbul (1929) – Jola Zezi
- Once I Loved a Girl in Vienna (1931) – Marchesa Giuseppina Savigliani
- The Night of Decision (1931) – Madame Alexandra
- The Men Around Lucy (1931) – Lola
- Poor as a Church Mouse (1931)
- Storms of Passion (1932) – Yvonne
- The Naked Truth (1932)
- Viennese Waltz (1932)
- A Blonde Dream (1932) – Illustrierte Ilse
- Mieter Schulze gegen alle (1932)
- Ich will Dich Liebe lehren (1933)
- Ist mein Mann nicht fabelhaft? (1933) – Frau Windisch
- The Page from the Dalmasse Hotel (1933) – Mrs. Wellington
- My Heart Calls You (1934) – Director of a Modesalon
- The Big Chance (1934) – Renate Rodenbeck
- The Brenken Case (1934) – Fräulein Bomst, Direktrice Gussersee-Hotel
- All Because of the Dog (1935) – Lottchen, seine Frau
- The Green Domino (1935) – Lulu Mielke
- Mädchenräuber (1936) – Frau des Hippodrombesitzers
- The Abduction of the Sabine Women (1936) – Adelgunde Striese
- Paul and Pauline (1936) – Bertha Wohlleben
- Orders Are Orders (1936) – Alwine Sommer
- Drei tolle Tage (1936) – Tante Jutta
- His Best Friend (1937) – Emmi Gärtner
- The Irresistible Man (1937) – Tante Renier
- Tip auf Amalia (1940) – Hippodrominhaberin Cora Barella
- Golowin geht durch die Stadt (1940) – Hetty Rado
- Jakko (1941) – Soubrette
- Der Hochtourist (1942) – Johanna Lallinger
- Am Ende der Welt (1947) – Corinna Valaine
- The Secret of the Red Cat (1949) – Laura
- By a Nose (1949) – Therese, seine Gattin
- The Blue Straw Hat (1949) – Seine Frau
- Trouble in Paradise (1950) – Ulrike Möller
- Nacht ohne Sünde (1950) – Frau Steinhauer
- Corinna Schmidt (1951) – Jenny Treibel
- Alraune (1952) – Fuerstin Wolkonska
- The Divorcée (1953) – Schauspielerin
- Mailman Mueller (1953) – Aunt Anna
- Jonny Saves Nebrador (1953) – Madame Dubouche
- Unter den Sternen von Capri (1953)
- Die Geschichte vom kleinen Muck (1953) – Ahavzi
- The Gypsy Baron (1954) – Zipra, eine alte Zigeunerin
- Oh, diese lieben Verwandten (1955) – Alwine, seine geschiedene Frau
- The Happy Wanderer (1955) – Milena Gaad, Gesangslehrerin
- Parole Heimat (1955) – Madame Janine
- Sonnenschein und Wolkenbruch (1955)
- Weil du arm bist, mußt du früher sterben (1956) – Frau Moll
- Holiday am Wörthersee (1956) – Generalin von Patzewitz
- The Old Forester House (1956) – Emilie Kramer
- Der schräge Otto (1957) – Frau Miefke
- Frauen sind für die Liebe da (1957) – Oberst von Brugg
- Sand, Love and Salt (1957) – Mother of Vida
- Es wird alles wieder gut (1957) – Tante Flora
- Doctor Bertram (1957) – Frau Gollicke
- At the Green Cockatoo by Night (1957) – Frl. Koldewey, Faktotum
- Skandal um Dodo (1959) – Frau Wiedehopf
- Auf Wiedersehen am blauen Meer (1962) – Bonny
