= The Beginning Was Sin =

- German film poster
- German: Am Anfang war es Sünde
- Directed by: František Čáp
- Written by: František Čáp
- Based on: "The Story of a Farm Girl" by Guy de Maupassant
- Produced by: Peter Bamberger
- Starring: Ruth Niehaus; Viktor Staal; Hansi Knoteck
- Cinematography: Bruno Stephan
- Edited by: Klaus Eckstein; Hilde Grebner; Ira Oberberg
- Music by: Bojan Adamič
- Production companies: Saphir-Film; Triglav Film
- Distributed by: Constantin Film
- Release date: 2 September 1954
- Running time: 96 minutes
- Countries: West Germany; Yugoslavia
- Language: German

The Beginning Was Sin (German: Am Anfang war es Sünde) is a 1954 West German-Yugoslavian drama film directed by František Čáp and starring Ruth Niehaus, Viktor Staal and Hansi Knoteck.

The film's sets were designed by the art director Mirko Lipuzic.

== Cast ==
- Ruth Niehaus as Rosalia
- Viktor Staal as Jacob, farmer
- Hansi Knoteck as Anna, his wife
- Peter Carsten as Marko, farmworker
- Laya Raki as gypsy dancer
- Edith Schultze-Westrum as Rosalia's mother
- Franz Muxeneder as Toni, farmworker
- Zvonimir Rogoz
- Petra Unkel as Therese, maid
- Olga Bedjanic as Dora
- Frane Milčinski
- Lojze Potokar
- Hans Pössenbacher as farmer
- Mila Kacic
- Boris Kralj
