= Ursula Under Suspicion =

1939 film directed by Karlheinz Martin

- Directed by: Karlheinz Martin
- Written by: Roland Schacht
- Based on: Ursula schwebt vorüber by Walther Harich
- Produced by: Karl Schulz
- Starring: Luli Deste; Anneliese Uhlig; Viktor Staal
- Cinematography: Georg Bruckbauer; Josef Střecha
- Edited by: Herbert B. Fredersdorf
- Music by: Werner Bochmann
- Production company: Bavaria Film
- Distributed by: Bavaria Film
- Release date: 1 November 1939
- Running time: 80 minutes
- Country: Germany
- Language: German

Ursula Under Suspicion (German: Verdacht auf Ursula) is a 1939 German mystery drama film directed by Karlheinz Martin and starring Luli Deste, Anneliese Uhlig and Viktor Staal. It was shot at the Barrandov Studios in Prague and on location at Opočno Castle. The film's sets were designed by the art directors Gerbert Hochreiter and Julius von Borsody.

== Cast ==
- Luli Deste as Ursula von Tweel
- Anneliese Uhlig as Pflegetochter Monika
- Viktor Staal as Klaus Ramin
- Heinz von Cleve as Pferdezüchter von Tweel
- Fritz Kampers as Kriminalkommissar Weigelt
- Grethe Weiser as Ellen Bork
- Käthe Haack as Agathe Ramin
- Richard Häussler as Bankangestellter Kißling
- Fritz Genschow as Gutsinspektor Arndt
- Charlie Albert Huber as Kriminalassistent
- Oscar Sabo as Güteragent Frisch
- Eugen Rex as Bücherrevisor Owelglas
- Hilde Larsen as Hausmädchen
- Aribert Grimmer as Vorarbeiter
- Herbert Weissbach as Stationsvorsteher
- Hans Junkermann as Gast bei Tweels
- Edwin Jürgensen as Gast bei Tweels
- Oskar Pouché as Gast bei Tweels
- F.W. Schröder-Schrom as Gast bei Tweels
- Heinrich Schroth as Gast bei Tweels
- Rudolf Schündler as Gast bei Tweels

== Bibliography ==
- Bergfelder, Tim, Carter, Erica & Göktürk, Deniz. The German Cinema Book. Bloomsbury Publishing, 2020.
- Goble, Alan. The Complete Index to Literary Sources in Film. Walter de Gruyter, 1999.
- Klaus, Ulrich J. Deutsche Tonfilme: Jahrgang 1939. Klaus-Archiv, 1988.
- Romani, Cinzia. Tainted Goddesses : Female Film Stars of the Third Reich. Da Capo Press, 1992.
