= The Victor (1932 film) =

1932 film

- Directed by: Hans Hinrich; Paul Martin
- Written by: Leonhard Frank; Robert Liebmann; Paul Martin; Billy Wilder
- Produced by: Erich Pommer
- Starring: Hans Albers; Käthe von Nagy; Julius Falkenstein; Hans Brausewetter
- Cinematography: Otto Baecker; Günther Rittau
- Music by: Werner R. Heymann
- Production company: UFA
- Distributed by: UFA
- Release date: 23 March 1932
- Running time: 92 minutes
- Country: Germany
- Language: German

The Victor (German: Der Sieger) is a 1932 German comedy film directed by Hans Hinrich and Paul Martin and starring Hans Albers, Käthe von Nagy and Julius Falkenstein. It premiered on 23 March 1932 at the Gloria-Palast in Berlin.

It was shot at the Babelsberg Studios in Berlin. The film's art direction was by Erich Kettelhut. A separate French-language version Le vainqueur was made, also directed by Hans Hinrich and Paul Martin, with Käthe von Nagy, Jean Murat and Pierre Brasseur.

== Synopsis ==
A postal clerk loses his money gambling on horses, but eventually meets and falls in love with a wealthy man's daughter.

== Cast ==
- Hans Albers as Hans Kühnert
- Käthe von Nagy as Helene
- Julius Falkenstein as Ponta
- Hans Brausewetter as Hunter
- Frida Richard as Kühnerts Mutter
- Max Gülstorff as Hoteldirektor
- Ida Wüst as Schneiderin
- Adele Sandrock as Ältere Dame im Hotel
- Willy Domgraf-Fassbaender as Ein Sänger
- Alfred Beierle
- Eugen Burg
- Hans Deppe
- Arthur Mainzer
- Arthur Peiser
- Willi Schur
- Bruno Ziener
- Comedian Harmonists as Themselves

== See also ==
- List of films about horses

== Bibliography ==
- Hardt, Ursula (1996). From Caligari to California: Erich Pommer's Life in the International Film Wars. Providence: Berghahn Books. ISBN 978-1-57181-930-7.
- Kreimeier, Klaus (1999). The Ufa Story: A History of Germany's Greatest Film Company, 1918–1945. Berkeley: University of California Press. ISBN 978-0-520-22069-0.
