= Ernst Legal =

German actor and opera director (1881-1955)

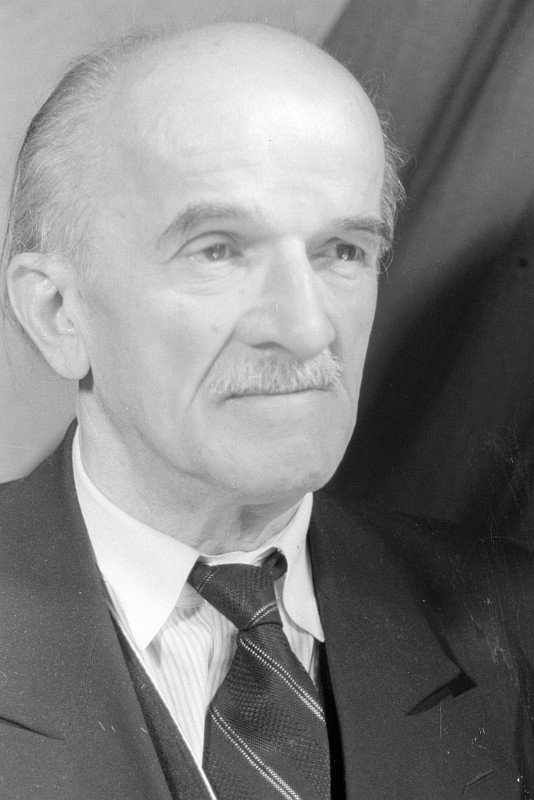
- Ernst Legal in 1945
- Born: Ernst Otto Eduard Legal; 2 May 1881; Schlieben, Prussia, German Empire
- Died: 29 June 1955 (aged 74); West Berlin, West Germany
- Occupation: Actor

Ernst Otto Eduard Legal (2 May 1881 – 29 June 1955) was a German actor and opera director of Berlin State Opera.

Born on 2 May 1881 in Schlieben in the Prussian Province of Saxony, he was the father of the actress Marga Legal. He died in West Berlin at age 74.

== Selected filmography ==
- The Mayor of Zalamea (1920) - Sergeant
- The Story of Christine von Herre (1921) - Schloßgärtner Dr.Ramiro
- The Agony of the Eagles (1922) - Fouché
- It Illuminates, My Dear (1922) - Tapier
- Friedrich Schiller (1923) - Iffland
- Die Nibelungen (1924)
- Waxworks (1924) - Poison-Maker of the Czar
- There Is a Woman Who Never Forgets You (1930)
- The Girlfriend of a Big Man (1934) - Vorhangzieher des Stadttheaters
- Hanneles Himmelfahrt (1934) - Seidel
- Charley's Aunt (1934) - Nelson
- Jede Frau hat ein Geheimnis (1934) - Dagmas Vater
- Love Conquers All (1934)
- Hundred Days (1935) - Ludwig XVIII
- The Man with the Paw (1935) - Kraatz, Chauffeur
- One Too Many on Board (1935) - Kriminalwachtmeister
- Anschlag auf Schweda (1935) - Hotelier Sutter
- Augustus the Strong (1936) - Graf Saumagen
- The Dreamer (1936) - Schladebach, Bäckermeister
- Kater Lampe (1936) - Spielwarenfabrikant Neubert
- Street Music (1936) - Otto Brommel - Straßenmusikant
- Maria the Maid (1936) - Mayor Kilmank
- Intermezzo (1936) - Ballon
- Doctor Engel (1936) - Josef Boelke
- His Best Friend (1937) - Emil Müller, Hausverwalter
- The Divine Jetta (1937) - Professor Cravallo
- The Glass Ball (1937) - Trödler
- The Man Who Was Sherlock Holmes (1937) - Dieter Jean
- When Women Keep Silent (1937) - Ricardo - Direktor einer Schallplattenfirma
- Seven Slaps (1937) - Mr. Strawman
- To New Shores (1937) - Stout
- Gabriele: eins, zwei, drei (1937) - Polizeibeamter
- The Model Husband (1937) - Möbelpacker
- Diamonds (1937) - Chattler
- An Enemy of the People (1937) - Baumeister
- The Mountain Calls (1938) - Amtsrichter
- Das große Abenteuer (1938) - Kapitän der 'Paddy'
- The Roundabouts of Handsome Karl (1938) - Der alte Albert - Kellner
- The Girl with a Good Reputation (1938) - Cosmo
- Musketier Meier III (1938) - Der Maire von Mavrin
- The Secret Lie (1938) - Bankdirektor, Finanzberater Carmens
- Nights in Andalusia (1938) - Wirt in Sevilla
- Diskretion - Ehrensache (1938) - Sergeant
- The Day After the Divorce (1938) - Der Wirt
- Unsere kleine Frau (1938) - Polizeisergeant
- Dance on the Volcano (1938) - Dr. Thibaud (uncredited)
- Das Leben kann so schön sein (1938) - Der Möbelhändler
- Mia moglie si diverte (1938) - Il cameriere di Paolo
- The Immortal Heart (1939) - Bader Bratvogel
- Spiel im Sommerwind (1939) - August Krückemeier
- The Leghorn Hat (1939) - Dienstmann
- Kennwort Machin (1939) - Dinklage, Werkstattvermieter
- The Journey to Tilsit (1939) - Herr Wittkuhn
- My Aunt, Your Aunt (1939) - Amtmann Henkel
- Der dunkle Punkt (1940)
- Pedro Will Hang (1941) - Plebejano
- Ich klage an (1941)
- The Comedians (1941) - Leibarzt der Zarin
- Jakko (1941) - Polizeikommissar
- Heimaterde (1941)
- Die heimlichen Bräute (1942) - Kutzbach
- A Gust of Wind (1942)
- Rembrandt (1942) - Bettler
- The Golden City (1942) - Pelikan - ein Bauer
- Andreas Schlüter (1942) - Professor Sturm
- Der große Schatten (1942) - Ehemaliger Inspizient des Provinztheaters
- I pagliacci (1943) - Un criminale (uncredited)
- Fahrt ins Abenteuer (1943) - Der Direktor, dem Rudi einen Hund verkaufen will
- Symphonie eines Lebens (1943) - Musikkritiker
- Die Jungfern vom Bischofsberg (1943)
- Laugh Bajazzo (1943) - Alter Verbrecher
- Romance in a Minor Key (1943) - Hard-of-hearing man
- Gefährlicher Frühling (1943)
- Immensee (1943) - Jürgens, Direktor der Spritfabrik (uncredited)
- Das schwarze Schaf (1944)
- Sieben Briefe (1944) - Kriminalrat
- Glück unterwegs (1944)
- Der Verteidiger hat das Wort (1944) - Seibold - Buchmacher
- The Degenhardts (1944)
- Dir zuliebe (1944)
- Spiel mit der Liebe (1944)
- Das Leben geht weiter (1945)
- Das Mädchen Juanita (1945) - Verwandter des Konsuls Henseling
- Rätsel der Nacht (1945)
- Leb' wohl, Christina (1945) - Opernintendant
- No Place for Love (1947) - William Spier
- Altes Herz geht auf die Reise (1947) - Amtsgerichtsrat Schulze
- Thank You, I'm Fine (1948) - August Petri, genannt Muschel
- The Adventures of Fridolin (1948) - Der Polizeipräfekt
- Und wieder 48 (1948) - Professor Kortlein
- Insolent and in Love (1948) - Nordboden, Besitzer des Detektivbüros
- The Marriage of Figaro (1949) - Antonio
- Mathilde Möhring (1950)
- A Day Will Come (1950) - Bürgermeister
- Der Untertan (1951) - Pastor Zillich
- Karriere in Paris (1952) - Vater Goriot
- The Stronger Woman (1953) - Spaziergänger
- Jonny Saves Nebrador (1953)
- Der verzauberte Königssohn (1953)
- Roman eines Frauenarztes (1954) - Professor Muthesius
- Der Himmel ist nie ausverkauft (1955) - (final film role)
