= Clemens Hasse =

German actor and synchroniser

- Born: 13 April 1908; Königsberg, East Prussia Imperial Germany
- Died: 28 July 1959 (aged 51); New York City, United States
- Occupation: Actor
- Years active: 1932–1958

Clemens Hasse (13 April 1908 – 28 July 1959) was a German actor and synchroniser.

== Biography ==
Hasse was born in Königsberg, East Prussia to a public official and attended his stage education at the Preussisches Staatstheater in Berlin. Between 1929 and 1944, when the Theater was closed down, he was a constant member of the Staatstheater ensemble.

Hasse first appeared in a UFA movie in 1932 and acted in several movies next to popular stars like Heinz Rühmann or Hans Albers. He was the German dubbing voice of Eddie Albert, Lou Costello, José Ferrer, Oliver Hardy, Sid James and also the voice of the white rabbit in Disneys Alice in Wonderland.

After World War II Hasse worked at the Schlosspark-Theater Berlin and after 1951 at the Schillertheater. He died of a heart attack at New York City on the occasion of his daughter's marriage and is buried at Waldfriedhof Dahlem in Berlin.

== Filmography ==
- Ja, treu ist die Soldatenliebe (1932)
- The Eleven Schill Officers (1932)
- Sacred Waters (1932)
- Glückspilze (1934)
- Kater Lampe (1936)
- Der müde Theodor (1936)
- Boccaccio (1936)
- Fräulein Veronika (1936)
- Ride to Freedom (1937)
- The Man Who Was Sherlock Holmes (1937)
- Capers (1937)
- 1938: Wie einst im Mai
- Covered Tracks (1938)
- By a Silken Thread (1938)
- 1938: Seputat & Co.
- Nanon (1938)
- Pour le Mérite (1938)
- Bachelor's Paradise (1939)
- 1939: Kennwort Machin
- The Journey to Tilsit (1939)
- 1940: Die unvollkommene Liebe
- The Great King (1940–42)
- U-Boote westwärts! (1941)
- 1941: Der Strom
- 1941–43: Nacht ohne Abschied
- Rembrandt (1942)
- Love Me (1942)
- His Son (1942)
- Sophienlund (1943)
- I Entrust My Wife to You (1943)
- Immensee (1943)
- Melody of a Great City (1943)
- 1943: Ein glücklicher Mensch
- Die Feuerzangenbowle (1944)
- Dreaming (1944)
- Love Letters (1944)
- Nora (1944)
- 1948: Vor uns liegt das Leben
- The Berliner (1948)
- The Great Mandarin (1949)
- Quartet of Five (1949)
- Josef the Chaste (1953)
- Canaris (1954)
- 1954: Herr über Leben und Tod
- The Captain and His Hero (1955)
- You Can No Longer Remain Silent (1955)
- The Girl from Flanders (1956)
- Skandal um Dr. Vlimmen (1956)
- 1958: Solang noch unter Linden
- The Man Who Couldn't Say No (1958)
- My Ninety Nine Brides (1958)
