= When Women Keep Silent =

- Directed by: Fritz Kirchhoff
- Written by: Rudo Ritter; Charles Amberg; Fritz Kirchhoff
- Produced by: Ulrich Mohrbutter
- Starring: Johannes Heesters; Hansi Knoteck; Friedrich Kramer; Ingeborg von Kusserow
- Cinematography: Otto Baecker
- Edited by: Erich Kobler
- Music by: Peter Fényes
- Production company: UFA
- Distributed by: UFA
- Release date: 20 July 1937
- Running time: 78 minutes
- Country: Germany
- Language: German

When Women Keep Silent (German: Wenn Frauen schweigen) is a 1937 German comedy film directed by Fritz Kirchhoff and starring Johannes Heesters, Hansi Knoteck and Friedrich Kramer.

== Synopsis ==
A newly married couple become involved in a series of marital differences, largely due to misunderstandings.

== Cast ==
- Johannes Heesters as Curt van Doeren
- Hansi Knoteck as Charlott - seine Frau
- Friedrich Kramer as Ferry Wörner - Schriftsteller
- Fita Benkhoff as Lilo - seine Frau
- Hilde von Stolz as Mira Mirella - Schauspielerin
- Hubert Endlein as Baron Cassoff
- Ernst Legal as Ricardo - Direktor einer Schallplattenfirma
- Ernst Waldow as Pirotti, Aufnahmeleiter
- Hilde Sessak as Maria, Sekretärin
- Georg H. Schnell as Conti, Theaterdirektor
- Ingeborg von Kusserow as Jenny - Zofe bei Wörners
- Rudolf Platte as Jean - Diener bei Wörners
- Günther Ballier as Hotelportier
- Charly Berger as Hotelgast
- Günther Brackmann as Boy
- Kurt Brenkendorf as Ober im Hotel
- Jac Diehl as Angestellter der Schallplattenfirma
- Max Ernst as Gast im Restaurant
- Alice Franz as Hotelangestellte
- Werner Funck as Farinello, Hoteldirektor
- Fred Goebel as Hotelportier
- Hella Graf as Blumenverkäuferin
- Alfred Heynisch as Besitzer des Schallplattengeschäfts
- Paul Hoffmann as Ehemann
- Edmond Leslie as Steptänzer
- Heinz Müller
- Hermann Pfeiffer as Taxifahrer
- Walter Raat-Kraatz as Arbeiter
- Ferdinand Robert as Gast in der Bar
- Hella Ronald as Ehefrau
- Liesel Spalinger as Tänzerin in der Bar
- Walter Steinweg as Barmann im Hotel
- Ruth Störmer as Schallplattenverkäuferin
- Achim von Biel as Ober in der Bar

== Bibliography ==
- Bock, Hans-Michael & Bergfelder, Tim. The Concise CineGraph. Encyclopedia of German Cinema. Berghahn Books, 2009.
