= The Prince of Arcadia =

1932 film

- Directed by: Karl Hartl
- Written by: Walter Reisch
- Produced by: Oskar Glück
- Starring: Willi Forst; Liane Haid; Hedwig Bleibtreu; Albert Paulig
- Cinematography: Franz Koch; Franz Planer
- Edited by: Else Baum; Karl Hartl
- Music by: Robert Stolz
- Production company: Projektograph Film
- Distributed by: Süd-Film
- Release date: 18 May 1932
- Running time: 89 minutes
- Countries: Austria; Germany
- Language: German

The Prince of Arcadia (German: Der Prinz von Arkadien) is a 1932 Austrian-German romance film directed by Karl Hartl and starring Willi Forst, Liane Haid and Hedwig Bleibtreu. It was shot at the Sievering Studios of Sascha Film in Vienna with sets designed by the art director Hans Ledersteger. Location filming took place at Ragusa in Sicily. It premiered on 18 May 1932.

== Cast ==
- Willi Forst as Der Prinz von Arkadien
- Liane Haid as Mary Mirana, eine Schauspielerin
- Hedwig Bleibtreu as Die Ex-Fürstin Tante
- Albert Paulig as Flügeladjutant Mölke zu Mölke
- Ingeborg Grahn as Die Infantin
- Edwin Jürgensen
- Reinhold Häussermann
- Alfred Neugebauer
- Ernst Arndt
- Walter Brandt
- Herbert Hübner
- Gustav Müller
- Paul Pranger

== Bibliography ==
- Grange, William. Cultural Chronicle of the Weimar Republic. Scarecrow Press, 2008.
