= Edwin Jürgensen =

German actor (1898–1947)

- Born: 24 May 1898; Cologne, German Empire
- Died: 1 April 1947 (aged 48); Berlin, Allied-occupied Germany
- Occupation: Actor
- Years active: 1930–1944

Edwin Max Eduard Jürgensen (24 May 1898 – 1 April 1947) was a German actor. He appeared in more than forty films from 1930 to 1944.

== Filmography ==
Year	Title	Role	Notes
1930	The Flute Concert of Sanssouci	Oesterreichischer Gesandter in Dresden	
1931	Marriage with Limited Liability	Kabarettdirektor	
1932	You Don't Forget Such a Girl	Ewald	
1932	The Prince of Arcadia		
1933	The Burning Secret		
1934	Ich kenn' dich nicht und liebe dich		
1934	The Csardas Princess	Der Manager	
1934	Count Woronzeff	Der Untersuchungsrichter	
1934	So Ended a Great Love	Talleyrand	
1935	The Gypsy Baron	Homonay	
1935	Mazurka	Staatsanwalt	Uncredited
1936	The Impossible Woman	Maravella	
1936	The Castle in Flanders	Sir Ramsey	
1936	Moscow–Shanghai	Director of nitery	
1936	The Unknown	Ministerialrat van Altendorf	
1936	The Court Concert	Theaterintendant	
1937	Ride to Freedom	Fürst Tschernikoff	
1937	The Grey Lady	J.v. Barnov	
1937	The Ways of Love Are Strange	Polizeipräfekt Montefranca	
1937	The Man Who Was Sherlock Holmes	Staatsanwalt	
1937	Patriots	Ortskommandant	
1937	To New Shores	Gouverneur Jones	
1937	Diamonds	Bertolezza	
1937	Gewitterflug zu Claudia	Quist	
1937	La Habanera	Shumann	
1937	Hahn im Korb	Direktor Flügel	
1937	Tango Notturno	Der Kapellmeister	
1938	Anna Favetti	Empfangschef	
1938	Nights in Andalusia	Major	
1938	Gastspiel im Paradies	An Actor	
1938	Freight from Baltimore	Friedrich Holst, Großkaufmann	
1938	Rubber	Untersuchungrichter	Uncredited
1938	Dreizehn Mann und eine Kanone		
1938	Sergeant Berry	Madison	Uncredited
1938	The Night of Decision	Direktor Lopez	
1939	The Green Emperor	Staatsanwalt im 1. Prozeß	
1939	Ich bin gleich wieder da	Empfangschef	
1939	Congo Express	Prefect	
1939	Ursula Under Suspicion	Gast bei Tweels	
1940	Der Postmeister		
1940	Traummusik		
1944	The Wedding Hotel	Berendt, Juwelier	(final film role)
