= The Hunter of Fall (1974 film) =

- Directed by: Harald Reinl
- Written by: Werner P. Zibaso
- Based on: The Hunter of Fall by Ludwig Ganghofer
- Produced by: Horst Hächler
- Starring: Siegfried Rauch; Hansi Knoteck; Viktor Staal
- Cinematography: Ernst W. Kalinke
- Edited by: Hermann Haller
- Music by: Ernst Brandner
- Production company: CTV 72 Film und Fernsehproduktion
- Distributed by: Constantin Film
- Release date: 10 October 1974
- Running time: 85 minutes
- Country: West Germany
- Language: German

The Hunter of Fall (German: Der Jäger von Fall) is a 1974 German drama film directed by Harald Reinl and starring Gerlinde Döberl, Alexander Stephan and Siegfried Rauch It depicts the battle between a Bavarian gamekeeper and a poacher. It is based on the novel The Hunter of Fall by Ludwig Ganghofer.

== Plot ==
In the late 19th century Bavarian Alps village of Fall, gamekeeper Friedl is called away to serve in the army. He promises his sweetheart Modei to visit her one year from now when he's on leave, but at that time his commander instead enlists his services for a hunting trip. Disappointed, Modei turns her attention towards Toni, the elder son of the well-to-do Huisen farmer family, and ends up giving birth to his son out of wedlock.

When Friedl returns another year later after his service has ended, and learns about Modei's involvement with Toni, tensions begin to rise between the two rivals. The conflict is exasperated by the fact that Toni, his younger brother Blasi and his friend Leitner are engaging in poaching. The whole village knows about this, but Toni was never caught; because of the distinctive pattern of his hobnailed bootprints, he has become known as "Nine-Nails" among the local foresters. Soon after Friedl's return, Toni and his gang conduct another hunt, transporting their spoils by raft down a river gorge. To prevent their escape, Friedl and his foresters cut down a tree to block the stream, but the tree falls too late and lands on top of the raft, killing Blasi, while Toni and Leitner escape by swimming down the river.

While Old Huisen covers for Toni, he disapproves of his son's poaching activities and threatens to disown him if he keeps disobeying. Additionally, Modei begins rejecting Toni and rekindles her relationship with Friedl. Seeking revenge, Toni starts attacking Friedl with deadly intent. At one point, he tries to ambush Friedl during one of his mountain patrols, but Friedl discovers the trap and chases after Toni. While fleeing to the alp hut where Modei lives with her brother Lenz, Toni loses his spare ammunition, and while he hides, Modei secretly removes the shells from his hunting gun. When Toni and Friedl confront each other at the hut, Toni is unable to shoot Friedl. When Friedl in turn prepares to kill Toni, Modei places herself between them to prevent Friedl from murdering an unarmed man. Misunderstanding her intention, Friedl promises to never bother her again, but Lenz, who likes Friedl and despises Toni, later clears things up and brings the two back together.

The Prince Regent of Bavaria arrives in Fall for a drive hunt event and chooses Friedl as his personal huntmaster. Informed by Leitner about which deerstand Friedl has chosen for the prince, Toni tries to snipe him, but a sudden change in the lighting blinds him, making him miss his shot. Chased by Friedl, Toni tries to flee across a bridge over the river gorge but runs into Lenz, who was looking for a lost cowbell. As the two men grapple, they fall off the bridge and land on a dry part of the riverbed. As Friedl climbs down to look after them, Toni prepares his knife to stab him, but Lenz bludgeons Toni to death with a rock before dying in Friedl's arms.

The film concludes with Old Huisen visiting his grandson for the first time, and with Friedl and Modei preparing to get married.

== Cast ==
- Alexander Stephan as Friedl, Hunter von Fall
- Gerlinde Döberl as Modei
- Siegfried Rauch as Huisentoni
- Klaus Löwitsch as Lenz, Modei's brother
- Hansi Knoteck as Friedl's Mother
- Viktor Staal as Förster
- Beppo Brem as Doktormartl
- Gerhart Lippert as Huisenblasi, Toni's brother
- Sepp Rist as Old Huisen, Toni and Blasi's father
- Alexander Golling as Grenzbauer
- Volker Prechtel as Leitner, Huisentoni's best friend
- Rudolf Prack as Prince Regent Luitpold

== Filming ==
The film's sets were designed by the art director Peter Rothe. Location shooting took place in Bavaria and the Austrian Tyrol.

== Bibliography ==
- Bock, Hans-Michael & Bergfelder, Tim. The Concise CineGraph. Encyclopedia of German Cinema. Berghahn Books, 2009.
