= Love Me (1942 film) =

1942 film

- German: Hab mich lieb
- Directed by: Harald Braun
- Written by: Kurt Bortfeldt; Georg Jacoby; Herbert Witt; Johann von Vásáry
- Produced by: Georg Jacoby
- Starring: Marika Rökk; Viktor Staal; Hans Brausewetter
- Cinematography: Reimar Kuntze
- Edited by: Margret Noell
- Music by: Franz Grothe
- Production company: UFA
- Distributed by: Deutsche Filmvertriebs
- Release date: 8 December 1942
- Running time: 100 minutes
- Country: Germany
- Language: German

Love Me or Make Love to Me (German: Hab mich lieb) is a 1942 German musical comedy film directed by Harald Braun and starring Marika Rökk, Viktor Staal and Hans Brausewetter. It was shot at the Tempelhof Studios in Berlin. The films sets were designed by the art director Ernst H. Albrecht. The film is a backstage musical and was a major commercial success on its release.

== Synopsis ==
A showgirl aspiring to greater things endeavours to sort out her financial and romantic problems.

== Cast ==
- Marika Rökk as Monika Koch
- Viktor Staal as Andreas Rüdiger
- Hans Brausewetter as Dr. Georg Nöhring
- Mady Rahl as Helene
- Aribert Wäscher as Director
- Ursula Herking as Frl. Müller
- Paul Henckels as Papa Schmidtke
- Günther Lüders as Paul, servant
- Herta Mayen as singer
- Hans von Kusserow as dancer
- Erich Dunskus
- Clemens Hasse
- Emil Heß
- Franz Weber
- Lucie Euler
- Sonja Kuske
- Karin Luesebrink
- Herbert Weissbach
- Eduard Wenck
- Willy Witte
- Maria Litto
- Lu Synd
