= Storms of Passion =

1932 film

- Directed by: Robert Siodmak
- Written by: Robert Liebmann; Hans Müller
- Produced by: Erich Pommer
- Starring: Emil Jannings; Anna Sten; Trude Hesterberg; Franz Nicklisch
- Cinematography: Otto Baecker; Günther Rittau
- Edited by: Viktor Gertler
- Music by: Friedrich Hollaender
- Production company: UFA
- Distributed by: UFA
- Release date: 22 January 1932
- Running time: 101 minutes
- Country: Germany
- Language: German

Storms of Passion (German: Stürme der Leidenschaft) is a 1932 German crime film directed by Robert Siodmak and starring Emil Jannings, Anna Sten and Trude Hesterberg. It is regarded as a precursor of film noir. The film was produced by Germany's leading film company UFA and shot at the Babelsberg Studios in Berlin. The sets were designed by the art director Erich Kettelhut. It premiered at the Ufa-Palast am Zoo on 22 January 1932. An alternative French language version Tumultes, starring Charles Boyer, was also released.

== Synopsis ==
Criminal Gustav Bumke is released early from his prison sentence and returns to the tenement block where he lives with girlfriend Annya. His old colleagues want him to join them on a bank robbery. He is reluctant at first, but when they run into trouble he comes to their assistance. Then, needing an alibi, he goes to a party where he witnesses Annya cheating on him with the photographer Ralph. In the ensuing struggle, his love rival falls to his death. Now wanted for murder, his hiding place is betrayed by his erstwhile girlfriend. Bumke calmy accepts arrest, feeling there is more truth inside prison than outside with the dishonest Annya.

== Cast ==
- Emil Jannings as Gustav Bumke
- Anna Sten as Russen-Annya
- Trude Hesterberg as Yvonne
- Franz Nicklisch as Willy Prawanzke
- Otto Wernicke as Police Commissioner
- Hans Deppe as Der Nuschler
- Hans Reimann as Max
- Julius Falkenstein as Paul
- Anton Pointner as Ralph Kruschewski
- Wilhelm Bendow as Emmerich
- Hermann Vallentin as Gefängnisdirektor

== Bibliography ==
- Grange, William. Cultural Chronicle of the Weimar Republic. Scarecrow Press, 2008.
- Hardt, Ursula. From Caligari to California: Erich Pommer's life in the International Film Wars. Berghahn Books, 1996.
- Spicer, Andrew. Historical Dictionary of Film Noir. Scarecrow Press, 2010.
