= U-boats Westward! =

1941 film by Günther Rittau

U-Boote westwärts!
- Directed by: Günther Rittau
- Written by: Georg Zoch
- Starring: Herbert Wilk
- Cinematography: Igor Oberberg
- Edited by: Johanna Meisel
- Music by: Harald Böhmelt
- Distributed by: UFA
- Release date: 9 May 1941
- Running time: 97 minutes
- Country: Nazi Germany
- Language: German
- Budget: 30,000 Marks

U-Boote westwärts! (in English: U-boats Westward!) is a 1941 German war film promoting the Kriegsmarine. It centers on a U-boat mission in the Battle of the Atlantic and was produced by UFA. The U-boat used for the film was U-123, which would later play a major role in Operation Drumbeat.

== Plot ==
The film opens aboard a U-boat as it returns from a mission. It then follows the crew onshore the day before they ship off for their next mission—meeting their families and sweethearts, spending a last night at a club, and so forth. Then they ship off, soon sighting and boarding a Dutch merchant ship, which they inspect for contraband. The boarding of the ship is shown being done professionally and in a non-confrontational manner. While they are aboard the Dutch ship, a Royal Navy ship spots them and tries to torpedo them, but the U-boat ends up sinking it.

== Cast ==
- Herbert Wilk as Kapitänleutnant Hoffmeister
- Heinz Engelmann as Olt. zur See Wiegand
- Joachim Brennecke as Lt. zur See v. Benedict
- Ernst Wilhelm Borchert as Olt. Griesbach
- Karl John as Matr. Ob. Gefr. Drewitz
- Clemens Hasse as Masch.-Maat Sonntag
- Ilse Werner as Irene Winterfeld
- Admiral Karl Dönitz as himself

== Motifs ==
The British are shown as cowardly and duplicitous. The film also glamorizes death in battle: the British ship was torpedoed even though it had German POWs, and one dies, speaking of the honor of dying for the fatherland.

== See also ==
- List of German films 1933–1945
- List of World War II films
