= The Double (1934 film) =

1934 film

- Directed by: E. W. Emo
- Written by: Edgar Wallace (novel); Curt J. Braun; Henry Koster; Peter Ort
- Produced by: Artur Hohenberg; Karel Lamac
- Starring: Georg Alexander; Camilla Horn; Gerda Maurus
- Cinematography: Otto Baecker; Günther Rittau
- Edited by: Ella Ensink
- Music by: Leo Leux
- Production company: Ondra-Lamac-Film
- Release date: 14 February 1934
- Running time: 88 minutes
- Country: Germany
- Language: German

The Double (German: Der Doppelgänger) is a 1934 German crime comedy film directed by E. W. Emo and starring Georg Alexander, Camilla Horn, and Gerda Maurus. It was the last Edgar Wallace adaptation made in Germany before the Second World War. The film's sets were designed by the art director Wilhelm Depenau and Erich Zander. It was shot at the Halensee Studios in Berlin.

== Plot ==
Mr Miller, who lives in Australia, believes his London-based wealth manager and distant relative, Harry Salsbury, has mismanaged his finances. He decides to travel to Europe with his niece Jenny to confront Harry. Jenny, who just turned 18, has already fallen in love with the image of cousin Harry. In Naples, she tricks her uncle into travelling to Paris while secretly flying to London herself. She moves in with Harry and turns his life upside down. Although he can prove that her uncle's assets are well invested in stocks and securities, Jenny insists on a change in his supposedly unhealthy lifestyle. In particular, she forces him to exercise and denies him his favorite foods.

Harry is friends with the married painter Germaine de Roche. Because her husband gets suspicious, he has her followed by the detective Superbus. To avoid this, Germaine persuades Harry to go to Ostend together. Harry, who under no circumstances wants to tell Jenny anything about this trip, pretends to be spending a few days in Scotland. His servant is supposed to send letters to Jenny from there. After Harry's departure, the detective Superbus pays Jenny a visit. He reports on a mysterious doppelganger who commits his crimes in the guise of respected London businessmen. His accomplice has the task of luring the victims out of London in order to be able to burglarise their properties undisturbed. When Jenny makes her way to the train station to warn Harry, he has already left.

Little does Jenny know that Harry has meanwhile returned to his villa because he feared a scandal. There, to his surprise, Harry meets Germaine, who pretends to have fled from her angry husband. Jenny, who has also returned in the meantime, thinks Harry and Germaine are the crooks and locks them up without further ado. Strange things are happening in the mansion at night. After a burglary and a shootout, the true doppelganger is revealed. The misunderstandings between Mr. Miller, Jenny and Harry are resolved. And in the end, Jenny and Harry are a couple.

== Cast ==
- Georg Alexander as Harry Selsbury
- Camilla Horn as Jenny Miller
- Gerda Maurus as Germaine de Roche
- Theo Lingen as Detektiv Superbus
- Fritz Odemar as Trentner, Diener bei Harry Selsbury
- Jakob Tiedtke as Mr. Miller
- Josef Eichheim as Raimondo Dempsi
- Hans Leisner-Fischer as Bobby Selsbury
- Willi Schur
- Franz Weber
- Michael von Newlinsky
- Marta Feist

== Bibliography ==
- Bergfelder, Tim (2005) [2004]. International Adventures: German Popular Cinema and European Co-Productions in the 1960s. New York: Berghahn Books. ISBN 978-1-57181-539-2.
