= Manon Lescaut (1926 film) =

1926 film by Arthur Robison

- Scene from the film
- Directed by: Arthur Robison
- Written by: Hans Kraly; Arthur Robison
- Based on: Abbe Prevost (novel:L'Histoire du Chevalier des Grieux et de Manon Lescaut)
- Produced by: Erich Pommer
- Starring: Lya De Putti
- Cinematography: Karl Freund; Theodor Sparkuhl
- Music by: Erno Rapee; Jules Massenet (stock music)
- Distributed by: UFA
- Release dates: 12 February 1926 (Germany); 5 April 1926 (Finland); 29 November 1926 (New York City); 22 August 1927 (Portugal)
- Running time: 99 minutes
- Country: Weimar Republic
- Languages: German (German title cards translated into English, other)

Manon Lescaut is a 1926 silent German feature film based on the oft-filmed novel by Abbé Prévost. It stars Lya De Putti and was directed by Arthur Robison. It was produced and distributed by renowned German film company Universum Film AG better known as UFA. A young actress named Marlene Dietrich had a supporting role in this production. A set decorator on this film was the soon to be American Expatriate Paul Leni, who would find great success as a director in Hollywood. It was shot at the Babelsberg and Tempelhof Studios, both of which were controlled by UFA.

In 1927, an American version was made, When a Man Loves.

== Plot ==
A French adventurer studying for the priesthood fights to save a woman in the life of prostitution.

== Cast ==
- Lya De Putti as Manon Lescaut
- Vladimir Gajdarov as Des Grieux
- Eduard Rothauser as Marschall des Grieux
- Fritz Greiner as Marquis de Bli
- Hubert von Meyerinck as Der Jung de Bli
- Frida Richard as Manons Tante
- Emilie Kurz as Manons Tante
- Lydia Potechina as Susanne
- Theodor Loos as Tiberge
- Sig Arno as Lescaut
- Trude Hesterberg as Claire
- Marlene Dietrich as Micheline
- Olga Engl
- Karl Harbacher
- Hans Junkermann
- Hermann Picha
