= So Ended a Great Love =

- Directed by: Karl Hartl
- Written by: Karl Hartl; Walter Reisch
- Produced by: Gregor Rabinovitch; Arnold Pressburger; Fritz Klotsch
- Starring: Paula Wessely; Willi Forst; Gustaf Gründgens
- Cinematography: Franz Planer
- Edited by: René Métain
- Music by: Franz Grothe
- Production company: Cine-Allianz
- Release date: 5 November 1934
- Running time: 94 minutes
- Country: Germany
- Language: German

So Ended a Great Love (German: So endete eine Liebe) is a 1934 German historical romance film directed by Karl Hartl and starring Paula Wessely, Willi Forst and Gustaf Gründgens.

The film's sets were designed by the art director Werner Schlichting. The film was made at the Johannisthal Studios in Berlin, with location shooting taking place in Würzburg and Hungary. An English-language version of the film was planned but never produced.

== Cast ==
- Paula Wessely as Grand Duchess Marie Louise
- Willi Forst as Franz, Duke of Modena
- Gustaf Gründgens as Count Metternich
- Franz Herterich as Emperor Franz I
- Erna Morena as Josephine
- Maria Koppenhöfer as Madame Mère
- Edwin Jürgensen as Talleyrand
- Rose Stradner as Kaiserin Maria Ludovica
- Gustav Waldau as Hofrat
- Helmuth Rudolph as Erster Offizier
- Olga Engl as erste Gesellschaftsdame der Kaiserin Maria Ludovika
- Annemarie Steinsieck as zweite Gesellschaftsdame der Kaiserin Maria Ludovika
- Toni Tetzlaff as dritte Gesellschaftsdame der Kaiserin Maria Ludovika
- Erich Dunskus as Laurenz, Maler Metternichs
- Angelo Ferrari as Ballettmeister

== Bibliography ==
- Hans-Michael Bock and Tim Bergfelder. The Concise Cinegraph: An Encyclopedia of German Cinema. Berghahn Books, 2009.
