= Count Woronzeff =

1934 film directed by Arthur Robison

- Directed by: Arthur Robison
- Written by: Margot von Simpson (novel); Walter Supper; Arthur Robison
- Produced by: Max Pfeiffer
- Starring: Albrecht Schoenhals; Hansi Knoteck; Willy Birgel; Heinrich Berg
- Cinematography: Otto Baecker; Günther Rittau
- Edited by: Herbert B. Fredersdorf
- Music by: Hans-Otto Borgmann
- Production company: UFA
- Distributed by: UFA
- Release date: 2 October 1934
- Running time: 85 minutes
- Country: Nazi Germany
- Language: German

Count Woronzeff (German: Fürst Woronzeff) is a 1934 German film directed by Arthur Robison and starring Albrecht Schoenhals, Hansi Knoteck and Willy Birgel. A separate French version The Secret of Woronzeff was also released. It was shot at UFA's Babelsberg and Templehof Studios in Berlin. The film's sets were designed by the art directors Erich Kettelhut and Max Mellin. Location filming took place in Cannes on the French Riviera.

== Cast ==
- Albrecht Schoenhals as Fürst Woronzeff & Baron Franz von Naydek
- Hansi Knoteck as Woronzeffs Tochter Nadja
- Willy Birgel as Petroff, Woronzeffs Sekretär
- Heinrich Berg as Otto von Naydek, Bruder Franz von Naydeks
- Brigitte Helm as Diane Morell
- Amanda Lindner as Tante Lydia
- Fritz Odemar as Onkel Gregor
- Günther Lüders as Vetter Boris
- Jakob Tiedtke as Onkel Iwan
- Kurt Fuß as Léon, Agent
- Edwin Jürgensen as Der Untersuchungsrichter
- Vladimir Sokoloff as Petroff
- Walther Ludwig as Sänger: Duett aus 'Samson und Dalida'
- Ruth Berglund as Sängerin - Duett aus 'Samson und Dalila'
- Fred Goebel
- Adele Sandrock
- Elisabeth von Ruets

== Bibliography ==
- Hake, Sabine (2001). Popular Cinema of the Third Reich. University of Texas Press. ISBN 978-0-292-73458-6.
