= Heinz Wemper =

German actor

- Born: 8 June 1903; Hattingen, Germany
- Died: 15 May 1985 (aged 81)
- Occupation: Actor
- Years active: 1929-1943

Heinz Wemper (8 June 1903 – 15 May 1985) was a German actor. He appeared in 27 films between 1929 and 1943.

== Selected filmography ==
- The Ship of Lost Souls (1929)
- Overnight Sensation (1932)
- Gold (1934)
- Police Report (1934)
- A Night on the Danube (1935)
- Black Roses (1935)
- Escapade (1936)
- A Doctor of Conviction (1936)
- The Czar's Courier (1936)
- Moscow-Shanghai (1936)
- The Man Who Was Sherlock Holmes (1937)
- The Ruler (1937)
- Sergeant Berry (1938)
- Northern Lights (1938)
- Dance on the Volcano (1938)
- Bravo Acrobat! (1943)
- The Investigation (1966, TV film)
