= Ride to Freedom =

1937 film

- Directed by: Karl Hartl
- Written by: Edmund Strzygowski; Walter Supper; Karl Hartl
- Produced by: Alfred Greven
- Starring: Willy Birgel; Viktor Staal; Hansi Knoteck; Ursula Grabley
- Cinematography: Otto Baecker; Günther Rittau
- Edited by: Gertrud Hinz-Nischwitz
- Music by: Wolfgang Zeller
- Production company: UFA
- Distributed by: UFA
- Release date: 14 January 1937
- Running time: 92 minutes
- Country: Germany
- Language: German

Ride to Freedom (German: Ritt in die Freiheit) is a 1937 German historical war film directed by Karl Hartl and starring Willy Birgel, Viktor Staal and Hansi Knoteck. The film is set in the 1830s during Poland's November Uprising against the Russian Empire. It portrays the rehabilitation of a Polish cavalry officer whose initial reluctance to engage the enemy leads to the death of his comrades, but who later dies fighting bravely.

The film was made by German's leading studio UFA, with interiors shot at the Babelsberg Studios. UFA received co-operation from the Polish War Ministry who supplied five regiments of Zaslaw Uhlans for the filming of battle scenes that took place around Ostroleka in Poland. The Polish ambassador to Germany Józef Lipski attended the film's premiere at the Palast-am-Zoo in Berlin on 14 January 1937. Around the same time Germany and Poland, future enemies in the Second World War, co-produced two films, namely Augustus the Strong and Adventure in Warsaw.

== Cast ==
- Willy Birgel as Julek Staniewski
- Viktor Staal as Jan Wolski
- Hansi Knoteck as Janka Koslowska
- Ursula Grabley as Katerina Tschernikoff
- Heinz von Cleve as Saganoff
- Berthold Ebbecke as Malinowski
- Werner Schott as Bobrikoff
- Edwin Jürgensen as Fürst Tschernikoff
- Hermann Braun as Milewski - polnischer Fähnrich
- Hans Reinhard Knitsch as Smirnoff - russischer Fähnrich
- Rudolf Schündler as Polnischer Student
- Aribert Grimmer as Polnischer Wachtmeister
- Clemens Hasse as Betrunkener Fährmann
- Peter Elsholtz as Adjutant des Gouverneurs
- Horst Birr as Krupka
- Charlie Kracker as Hässlicher Ulan
- Lidija Daurdina as Gouvernante
- Werner Bernhardy as Major
- Curt Cappi as Diener des Rittmeisters Staniewski
- Hermann Hardy as Erzieher des Prinzen
- Gustav Mahncke]] as Unparteiischer beim Duell
- Dagmar Muthardt as Junges Mädchen beim Ball
- Siegmar Schneider as Großfürst
- Louise von Krogh as Begleiterin des Gouverneurs beim Ball
- Michael von Newlinsky as Russischer Offizier beim Ball
- Kurt Daehn

== Bibliography ==
- Kreimeier, Klaus (1999). The Ufa Story: A History of Germany's Greatest Film Company, 1918–1945. University of California Press. ISBN 978-0-520-22069-0.
