= The Gypsy Baron (1935 film) =

1935 film

- Directed by: Karl Hartl
- Written by: Mór Jókai (novel); Vineta Klinger; Ignaz Schnitzer (libretto); Walter Supper; Tibor Yost
- Produced by: Bruno Duday
- Starring: Anton Walbrook; Hansi Knoteck; Fritz Kampers
- Cinematography: Otto Baecker; Günther Rittau
- Edited by: Milo Harbich
- Music by: Alois Melichar; Johann Strauss (operetta)
- Production company: UFA
- Distributed by: UFA
- Release date: 17 April 1935
- Running time: 105 minutes
- Country: Germany
- Language: German

The Gypsy Baron (German: Zigeunerbaron) is a 1935 German operetta film directed by Karl Hartl and starring Anton Walbrook, Hansi Knoteck and Fritz Kampers. It is an adaptation of the 1885 operetta The Gypsy Baron. It was made at the Babelsberg Studios of UFA in Berlin. The film's sets were designed by the art director Werner Schlichting. It was shot on location in Brandenburg and the Kingdom of Yugoslavia. A separate French-language version, Le baron tzigane, was also produced.

== Main cast ==
- Anton Walbrook as Sandor Barinkay
- Hansi Knoteck as Saffi
- Fritz Kampers as Koloman Zsupan
- Gina Falckenberg as Arsena Zsupan, seine Tochter
- Edwin Jürgensen as Homonay
- Rudolf Platte as Ernö
- Josef Sieber as Pali
- Margarete Kupfer as Czipra
- Kenneth Rive as Junge

== Bibliography ==
- Goble, Alan (1999). The Complete Index to Literary Sources in Film. Walter de Gruyter. ISBN 978-3-11-095194-3.
