= The Student of Prague (1935 film) =

1935 film directed by Arthur Robison

- Directed by: Arthur Robison
- Written by: Hanns Heinz Ewers; Henrik Galeen; Hans Kyser; Arthur Robison
- Starring: Anton Walbrook; Theodor Loos; Dorothea Wieck
- Cinematography: Bruno Mondi
- Edited by: Roger von Norman
- Music by: Theo Mackeben
- Production company: Cine-Allianz
- Distributed by: Tobis Film; Sascha Film (Austria)
- Release date: 10 December 1935
- Running time: 87 minutes
- Country: Germany
- Language: German

The Student of Prague (German: Der Student von Prag) is a 1935 German horror film directed by Arthur Robison and starring Anton Walbrook, Theodor Loos and Dorothea Wieck. It is based on the eponymous novel by Hanns Heinz Ewers which had previously been adapted into celebrated silent films on two occasions. It was shot at the Johannisthal and EFA Studios in Berlin. The film's sets were designed by the art director Karl Haacker.

== Cast ==
- Anton Walbrook as Balduin
- Theodor Loos as Dr. Carpis
- Dorothea Wieck as Julia
- Erich Fiedler as Baron Waldis
- Edna Greyff as Lydia
- Karl Hellmer as Krebs
- Volker von Collande as Zavrel
- Fritz Genschow as Dahl
- Elsa Wagner as Jarmila
- Miliza Korjus as Julia

== Critical reception ==
Writing for The Spectator in 1936, Graham Greene characterized the film as "dull [and] a curiosity, a relic of the classical German film of silent days". Negatively comparing the film to Galeen's 1926 version of the story, Greene found that the story was less believable and the acting less memorable. In favor of the film, Greene noted "one can say at any rate that it is on the right side".

== See also ==
- The Student of Prague (1913)
- The Student of Prague (1926)
