= Winter in the Woods (1936 film) =

- Directed by: Fritz Peter Buch
- Written by: Paul Keller (novel); Curt J. Braun; Fritz Peter Buch
- Produced by: Ulrich Mohrbutter
- Starring: Viktor Staal; Hansi Knoteck; Hans Zesch-Ballot
- Cinematography: Otto Baecker; Günther Rittau
- Edited by: Walter Fredersdorf
- Music by: Hans Ebert
- Production company: UFA
- Distributed by: UFA
- Release date: 14 July 1936
- Running time: 92 minutes
- Country: Germany
- Language: German

Winter in the Woods (German: Waldwinter, "Forest Winter") is a 1936 German drama film directed by Fritz Peter Buch and starring Viktor Staal, Hansi Knoteck and Hans Zesch-Ballot. It was shot at the Babelsberg Studios of UFA in Berlin. The film's sets were designed by the art director Max Mellin. It was remade in 1956 under the same title.

== Cast ==
- Viktor Staal as Walter Peters, Schriftsteller
- Hansi Knoteck as Marianne von Soden
- Hans Zesch-Ballot as Dr. Fritz Heidecke
- Eduard von Winterstein as Der Förster
- Ingeborg Hertel as Ingeborg, seine Nichte
- Volker von Collande as Hartwig, Glasbläster
- Ewald Wenck as Baumann
- Theodor Popp as Erich Flemming
- Paul Rehkopf as Sternitzke
- Heinz Berghaus
- Eduard Bornträger as Landarzt
- Leo Delsan
- Charles Francois as Gast bei der Silvesterfeier
- Otto Heidrich
- Ingolf Kuntze as Redaktionsdirektor
- Karl Morvilius as Kuchenbäcker
- Josef Reithofer as Vater von Soden
- Erik Schütz
- Beppo Seidler as Baudenwirt
- Hildegard Unger as Redaktionssekretärin
- Inge Vesten as Dienstmädchen
- Günther Vogdt as Akkordeonspieler
- Achim von Biel as Dr. Heideckes Diener
- Eduard Wenck as Kellner

== Bibliography ==
- Klaus, Ulrich J. Deutsche Tonfilme: Jahrgang 1936. Klaus-Archiv, 1988.
- Williams, Alan. Film and Nationalism. Rutgers University Press, 2002.
