= Gold (1934 film) =

1934 film

- German theatrical poster for Gold
- Directed by: Karl Hartl
- Written by: Rolf E. Vanloo
- Cinematography: Günther Rittau; Otto Baecker; Werner Bohne
- Edited by: Wolfgang Becker
- Music by: Hans-Otto Borgmann
- Production company: Universum-Film AG
- Release date: 29 March 1934 (Germany)
- Running time: 120 minutes
- Country: Germany
- Languages: German; French

Gold is a 1934 German science fiction film directed by Karl Hartl. The film involves a German scientist's attempt to create a machine that turns base materials into gold, a project that attracts the unwelcome attention of a British industrialist. Gold was made in both German-language and French-language versions with Brigitte Helm reprising her role in both.

== Plot ==
A German scientist, Achenbach, has discovered a theoretical means of transforming lead into gold through "atomic fracture." Working with engineer Werner Holk, he is literally moments from proving his theory when his lab is blown up by a saboteur bribed by the British industrialist John Wills. Achenbach is killed and Holk only survives thanks to a blood transfusion from his fiancée Margit. Holk is then hired by Wills and goes to Scotland to see his friend's work recreated on a massive scale in a secret laboratory beneath the North Sea. Bent on revenge, he agrees to help Wills and uses the machine to create a small sample of gold, vindicating Achenbach's theory and gaining the millionaire's confidence. In the meantime he wins the trust of the workers and of the millionaire's estranged daughter Florence (Helm), who is romantically drawn to him. Holk puts together a plan to destroy the machine before the artificial gold it would create can wreak havoc on the world economy. Just as the machine is set to go into operation, Holk delivers a speech turning the workers against the millionaire and sets the machine to self-destruct. Wills and the lab are blown up in a spectacular sequence of explosions and strobe lighting. Holk himself escapes by the skin of his teeth and returns to his fiancée in Germany.

== Production ==
Director Karl Hartl developed Gold after the international success of his previous science fiction film Der Tunnel. Gold was the studio Universum Film AG's superproduction of that time and took 15 months to shoot.

Actor Hans Albers sued the production asking for nearly double his salary but lost the case. During this production period, a French-language version of the film, L'Or, was also made which kept Brigitte Helm as the lead actress but changed many of the supporting characters roles. Serge de Poligny directed the scenes in French with the script adapted to French by Jacques Thierry.

== Cast ==
German-language version

- Hans Albers as Werner Holk
- Brigitte Helm as Florence Wills
- Michael Bohnen as John Wills
- Lien Deyers as Margit Möller
- Friedrich Kayßler as Prof. Achenbach
- Ernst Karchow as Lüders
- Eberhard Leithoff as Harris
- Willi Schur as Pitt
- Hans-Joachim Büttner as Becker
- Walter Steinbeck as Brann
- Heinz Wemper as Vesitsch
- Rudolf Platte as Schwarz
- Heinz Salfner as Direktor Sommer
- Erich Haußmann as Sekretär

French-language version

- Brigitte Helm as Florence Wills
- Pierre Blanchar as François Berthier
- Roger Karl as John Wills
- Rosine Deréan as Hélène
- Louis Gauthier as Lefèvre
- Jacques Dumesnil as Malescot
- Marc Valbel as Harris
- Robert Goupil as Le journaliste
- Pierre Piérade as un domestique
- Raoul Marco as O'Kelly

== Release ==
Gold premiered in Berlin at the Ufa-Palast am Zoo theater on 29 March 1934. The French-language version was shown on 1 June 1934. When the film was reviewed by the Allied censorship boards after World War II, the viewers pondered whether German scientists had been able to build a nuclear reactor long before it was originally thought they did. Parts of the stock footage scenes in Gold were later used again in the 1953 American film The Magnetic Monster.

== Reception ==
In 1934, the New York Times gave the film a positive review stating "So well is this mixture of pseudo science, love and near-love photographed that persons ignorant of German need have no fear of inability to follow the action" and noting that "the audience is kept interested in the steps leading up to the dénouement, despite the inordinate length of the film." Wonder Stories praised Gold as "a masterful scientifilm fantasy". Film Daily praised the cast and called the film an "entertaining drama [that] is essentially interesting from the technical angle."

Variety reviewed the French-language L'Or stating that the film "depends for its effect on sensational machinery - a Frankenstein electric machine to make synthetic gold - and such makes a certain impression.... Aside from that, pic is commonplace."

== See also ==
- List of German films of 1933–1945
- List of science-fiction films of the 1930s

== Notes ==
=== Sources ===
- Erickson, Hal. "Gold". AllMovie. Archived from the original on 30 June 2012.
- Pitts, Michael R. (2018). Thrills Untapped: Neglected Horror, Science Fiction and Fantasy Films, 1928-1936. McFarland. ISBN 978-1476632896.

== Works cited ==
- Hull, David (1969). Film in the Third Reich: Art and Propaganda in Nazi Germany. Simon & Schuster. SBN 671214861.
