= Diamonds (1937 film) =

1937 film

- Directed by: Eduard von Borsody
- Written by: Emil Burri; Walter Forster
- Produced by: Eduard von Borsody; Erich von Neusser
- Starring: Hansi Knoteck; Viktor Staal; Hilde Körber
- Cinematography: Günther Anders
- Edited by: Marianne Behr
- Music by: Lothar Brühne
- Production company: UFA
- Distributed by: UFA
- Release date: 22 October 1937
- Running time: 82 minutes
- Country: Germany
- Language: German

Diamonds (German: Brillanten) is a 1937 German mystery film directed by Eduard von Borsody and starring Hansi Knoteck, Viktor Staal, and Hilde Körber.

The film's sets were designed by the art director Walter Röhrig. Location shooting took place in Amsterdam and Hamburg.

== Cast ==
- Hansi Knoteck as Mimi Huygens
- Viktor Staal as Piet Maartens
- Hilde Körber as Tine
- Hans Brausewetter as Willem Teierling
- Hans Olden as Viktor Lamont
- Aribert Wäscher as Diener Wells
- Valy Arnheim as Herr Dane
- Charlott Daudert as Fräulein Howard
- Willi Schaeffers as Juwelier Huitten
- Edwin Jürgensen as Bertolezza
- Paul Heidemann as Der Regisseur
- Albert Florath as Der Richter
- Ernst Legal as Chattler
- Hanni Weisse as Artistin
- Leo Peukert as Produzent der Revue
- Hans Kettler as Maastbrook, Kriminalkommissar
- Angelo Ferrari as Der Tänzer von Miss Howard
- Klaus Pohl as Inspizient
- Else Reval as Fräulein Brown
- Toni Tetzlaff as Gesellschafterin
- Bruno Ziener as Livrierter Diener im Speisesaal
- Erika Raphael as Artistin beim Interview mit Teierling

== Bibliography ==
- Silberman, Marc (1995). German Cinema: Texts in Context. Detroit: Wayne State University Press. ISBN 978-0-8143-2560-5.
