= A Girl from the Chorus =

1937 film

- German film poster
- German: Ein Mädel vom Ballett
- Directed by: Carl Lamac
- Written by: Václav Wasserman; Charles Amberg; Wolf Neumeister; Aldo von Pinelli
- Produced by: Carl Lamac; Anny Ondra; Hans Herbert Ulrich; Robert Wüllner
- Starring: Anny Ondra; Viktor Staal; Ursula Grabley
- Cinematography: Willy Winterstein
- Edited by: Ella Ensink
- Music by: Paul Hühn
- Production companies: Ondra-Lamac-Film; UFA
- Distributed by: UFA
- Release date: 12 January 1937
- Running time: 83 minutes
- Country: Germany
- Language: German

A Girl from the Chorus (German: Ein Mädel vom Ballett) is a 1937 German comedy film directed by Carl Lamac and starring Anny Ondra, Viktor Staal and Ursula Grabley. It is set in the theatre world of Berlin around the turn of the twentieth century.

It was shot at the Babelsberg Studios in Berlin. The film's sets were designed by the art directors Wilhelm Depenau and Karl Vollbrecht.

== Cast ==
- Anny Ondra as Henriette Lange
- Viktor Staal as Hans Reuter
- Ursula Grabley as Liesbeth Grimme
- Erika Körner as Vera Schreyvogel
- Rudolf Platte as Paul Dettmann
- Robert Dorsay as Max
- Hans Hermann Schaufuß as Berthold Lange
- Egon Brosig as Der 'Truthahn'
- Ernst Rotmund as Schröder
- Klaus Pohl as Inspizient
- Else Lüders as Gardrobiere
- Hellmuth Passarge as horse groomer
- Luise Werckmeister as owner of Plätt-Stube
- Aribert Grimmer as cobbler
- Ernst Albert Schaach as waiter
