= To New Shores =

1937 film

- Directed by: Detlef Sierck
- Written by: Lovis Hans Lorenz (novel); Kurt Heuser; Douglas Sirk
- Produced by: Bruno Duday
- Starring: Zarah Leander; Willy Birgel; Viktor Staal; Carola Höhn
- Cinematography: Franz Weihmayr
- Edited by: Milo Harbich
- Music by: Ralph Benatzky
- Production company: UFA
- Distributed by: UFA
- Release date: 31 August 1937
- Running time: 106 minutes
- Country: Germany
- Language: German

To New Shores (German: Zu neuen Ufern) is a 1937 German drama film directed by Detlef Sierck (later known as Douglas Sirk) and starring Zarah Leander, Willy Birgel and Viktor Staal. It was Leander's first film for the German studio UFA, and its success brought her into the front rank of the company's stars. It was shot at the Babelsberg Studio in Berlin. The film's sets were designed by the art director Fritz Maurischat.

== Synopsis ==
London, 1846. Gloria Vane, is a cabaret singer and the lover of Sir Albert Finsbury, a selfish aristocrat set to join the royal cavalry in Australia as an officer. The night before Albert leaves England, he begs a friend for money to repay debts. The angry friend gives Albert only £15, instead of the £615 Albert needs, so Albert forges the number 6 before the 15 on the check. When his forgery is discovered, Albert has already left. Gloria confesses to the crime out of love for Albert and to protect his promising career as an officer.

Gloria is tried, found guilty, and sentenced to be transported to Australia to serve seven years in the Parramatta prison in Sydney. In prison, Gloria dreams only of being reunited with Albert, and writes him a letter, begging him to rescue her. Albert is already engaged, however, to Mary Jones, the daughter of his commanding officer, the Governor of New South Wales. Albert is also having an affair with Fanny, the wife of a local doctor, Dr. Hoyer.

Albert tears up Gloria's letter, afraid she will endanger his career. Albert goes to the prison, but cannot bring himself to visit Gloria, though he learns from the prison wardress that he could save Gloria. The wardress tells Albert that, due to the shortage of women in the colony, any female prisoner can be released, if she finds a man to marry her.

Meanwhile, Henry Hoyer, a local farmer and horse breeder, sees Gloria leaving the prison chapel and falls instantly in love. Henry is Dr. Hoyer’s nephew and recently sold Albert a horse, but knows nothing of Albert's connection to Gloria. Gloria eventually allows herself to be paraded with the marriageable female prisoners before the male suitors. Henry attends the event and tells the wardress he will marry Gloria. Gloria half-heartedly agrees, to get out of prison. However, as Gloria and Henry ride back to his farm, she admits she loves Albert and cannot marry Henry. She intended to abandon Henry with no explanation, but tells him he’s so kind she cannot bear to leave without telling him the truth. Gloria jumps from his wagon and runs back to the city, leaving Henry brokenhearted.

Gloria learns Albert is at a ball celebrating Queen Victoria's birthday, at the Governor's mansion. She races there, but as she waits for him outside, she hears the announcement of his engagement to Mary and leaves, despondent. Meanwhile, out on his farm, Henry also learns of Albert's engagement to Mary and realizes Gloria will be left all alone. Still in love with Gloria, Henry races back to Sydney to rescue her.

Albert finds Gloria working at a dingy music hall. He watches her perform a gloomy song about her broken heart, then talks to her backstage. Gloria is a broken woman. She turns down Albert's offer to stay with her, telling him she no longer loves him - he left her in prison too long, it is too late. Gloria reveals she was convicted of the check fraud he committed. Overwhelmed with guilt, Albert commits suicide that night, on the eve of his wedding to Mary.

The next day, Gloria gets fired from the music hall for singing such a depressing song. With nothing left in her life, she returns to the prison and asks to be readmitted. Henry and Dr. Hoyer discover Albert's corpse and word is sent to the Governor's mansion that the wedding ceremony must be cancelled. Dr. Hoyer returns home and tells Fanny that Albert is dead. Fanny assumes her husband killed Albert, since he knew about their affair all along. Fanny hurries to arrange their escape, but Dr. Hoyer explains he did not kill Albert. Fanny's urge to protect Dr. Hoyer convinces him that she truly loves him, and he forgives her for her affair.

Henry goes to the music hall and learns Gloria has returned to prison. Henry finds Gloria in the prison chapel, where he first fell in love with her. Henry tells Gloria he still loves her and asks her to be his wife. They are married alongside Gloria's best friend from prison, who they discover is simultaneously marrying an employee of Henry's.

== Main cast ==
- Zarah Leander as Gloria Vane
- Willy Birgel as Sir Albert Finsbury
- Viktor Staal as Henry Hoyer
- Carola Höhn as Mary Jones
- Edwin Jürgensen as Governor Jones
- Erich Ziegel as Dr. Magnus Hoyer
- Hilde von Stolz as Fanny Hoyer
- Jakob Tiedtke as cheesemaker Wells
- Robert Dorsay as Bobby Wells
- Ernst Legal as Stout
- Siegfried Schürenberg as Captain Gilbert
- Lina Lossen as wardress in Paramatta
- Lissy Arna as prisoner Nelly
- Herbert Hübner as music hall manager
- Mady Rahl as Soubrette
- Lina Carstens as Bänkelsängerin
- Paul Bildt as priest and barber

== Bibliography ==
- Ascheid, Antje (2010). Hitler's Heroines: Stardom and Womanhood in Nazi Cinema. Philadelphia: Temple University Press. ISBN 978-1-59213-843-2.
- Bock, Hans-Michael; Bergfelder, Tim, eds. (2009). The Concise Cinegraph: Encyclopaedia of German Cinema. New York: Berghahn Books. ISBN 978-1-57181-655-9.
