= Viktor Staal =

Austrian actor

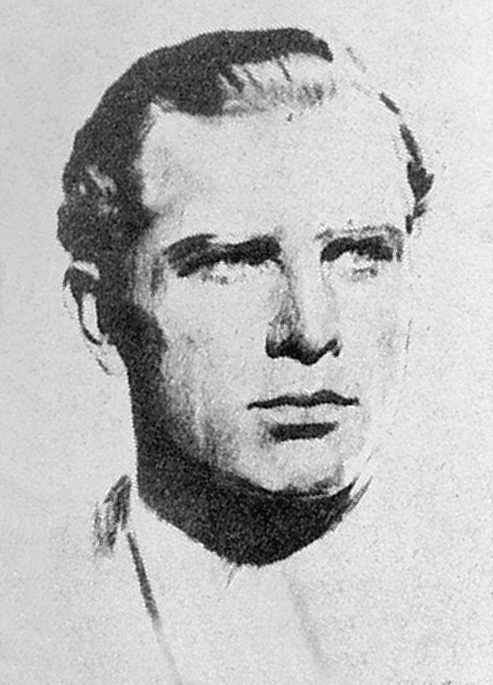
- Born: 17 February 1909; Frankstadt, Moravia, Austria-Hungary
- Died: 4 June 1982 (aged 73); Munich, Bavaria, West Germany
- Occupation: Film actor
- Years active: 1935–1977

Viktor Staal (17 February 1909 – 4 June 1982) was an Austrian actor. He was trained at a drama school in Vienna and was active as a stage actor at the Vienna Volksoper and provincial theaters in Austria during his early career. In 1935 he joined the roster of actors signed to the Germany motion picture company UFA. He was one of Germany's most popular film actors of the 1930s, 1940s, and 1950s. After this he performed with less frequency into the 1970s. He died in 1982 at the age of 73.

== Selected filmography ==
- Everything for the Company (1935)
- Eva, the Factory Girl (1935)
- Lessons in Love (1935)
- The World's in Love (1935)
- Waltz Around the Stefanstower (1935)
- Donogoo Tonka (1936) - Pierre Lamendin
- Winter in the Woods (1936) - Walter Peters, Schriftsteller
- A Girl from the Chorus (1937) - Hans Reuter
- Ride to Freedom (1937) - Jan Wolski
- To New Shores (1937) - Henry Hoyer
- Diamonds (1937) - Piet Maartens
- A Night in May (1938) - Poldi Sonnleitner
- Capriccio (1938) - Fernand de Villeneuve
- Fortsetzung folgt (1938) - Viktor Bork - Schriftsteller
- Storms in May (1938) - Willy Prinz
- Women for Golden Hill (1938) - Douglas
- Detours to Happiness (1939) - Mathias Holberg
- The Right to Love (1939) - Vinzenz Brunner
- Ursula Under Suspicion (1939) - Klaus Ramin
- Twilight (1940) - Walter Gruber
- Liebesschule (1940) - Heinz Wölfing, Schriftsteller
- Lightning Around Barbara (1941) - Anton Walcher
- Heimaterde (1941)
- The Great Love (1942) - Oberleutnant Paul Wendlandt
- Love Me (1942) - Andreas Rüdiger
- Du gehörst zu mir (1943) - Dr. Groone
- Die Gattin (1943) - Peter Niklas
- Nora (1944) - Dr. Robert Helmer
- Via Mala (1945) - Andreas von Richenau
- Between Yesterday and Tomorrow (1947) - Rolf Ebeling
- Verführte Hände (1949) - Gorg Reinhart
- Einmaleins der Ehe (1949) - Dr. Johannes Kellmann
- Die seltsame Geschichte des Brandner Kaspar (1949) - Gidi
- Mathilde Möhring (1950) - Hugo Großmann
- Everything for the Company (1950) - Herr Knesing
- Trouble in Paradise (1950) - Hans Soltau
- Eine Frau mit Herz (1951)
- Das fremde Leben (1951) - Werftbesitzer Jürgen Fredersen
- Veronika the Maid (1951) - Richard
- Im Banne der Madonna (1951) - Michael Trautner
- The Last Shot (1951) - Thomas Scharrer
- House of Life (1952) - Willi Kuschitzky
- The Exchange (1952) - Simon Gigl
- When the Heath Dreams at Night (1952) - Karl Odewig
- Your Heart Is My Homeland (1953) - Karlheinz Reiling
- Aunt Jutta from Calcutta (1953) - Dr. Hans Hannemann, Rechtsanwalt / Lawyer
- The Postponed Wedding Night (1953) - Christian Möbius
- The Beginning Was Sin (1954) - Jacob, Bauer
- Marriage Impostor (1954) - Ernest Harrington
- The Blacksmith of St. Bartholomae (1955) - Thomas
- The Dark Star (1955) - Casseno
- Closed Exit (1955) - Juan
- The Mistress of Solderhof (1955) - Dr. Stefan Heim
- Regine (1956) - Friedrich Wentland
- Spy for Germany (1956) - Oberst Sommerfeld
- Seamen (1957) - Friedrich Harkort
- Wetterleuchten um Maria (1957) - Mayor
- The Fox of Paris (1957) - Col. Toller
- Taiga (1958) - Weber
- Der schwarze Blitz (1958) - Lehrer Thalhammer
- Die Sklavenkarawane (1958) - Kara Ben Nemsi
- Hunting Party (1959) - Jakob Reinhard
- Wild Water (1962) - Förster Böhmel
- Trompeten der Liebe (1962) - Supt. Mank
- Die drei Scheinheiligen (1964) - Dr. Ebert
- Freddy, Tiere, Sensationen (1964) - Zirkusdirektor
- Help, I Love Twins (1969) - Dr. Peters
- The Hunter of Fall (1974) - Förster
- The Standard (1977) - Anton (final film role)

=== Television ===
- Quadrille (1961, TV Movie) - Axel Diensen
- Interpol (1963) - Arthur Redgrave
- Alarm in den Bergen (1965)
- Die Tintenfische (1966) - Dr. Hellerer
- Landarzt Dr. Brock (1967-1968) - Dr. Kurt Vielhaber
- Pater Brown (1972) - Oberst
