= The Green Domino (1935 film) =

1935 film

- Directed by: Herbert Selpin
- Written by: Harald Bratt; Emil Burri
- Based on: Der Fall Claasen by Erich Ebermayer
- Produced by: Alfred Greven
- Starring: Brigitte Horney; Karl Ludwig Diehl; Theodor Loos
- Cinematography: Otto Baecker; Günther Rittau
- Edited by: Oswald Hafenrichter
- Music by: Gottfried Huppertz; Walter Schütze
- Production company: UFA
- Distributed by: UFA
- Release date: 4 October 1935
- Running time: 88 minutes
- Country: Germany
- Language: German

The Green Domino (German: Der grüne Domino) is a 1935 German mystery drama film directed by Herbert Selpin and starring Brigitte Horney, Karl Ludwig Diehl and Theodor Loos. It was shot at the Babelsberg Studios in Berlin and on location in Bavaria around Munich and the Tegernsee. The film's sets were designed by the art directors Otto Hunte and Willy Schiller. It is based on the novel Der Fall Claasen by Erich Ebermayer. A separate French-language version Le Domino vert was also produced, directed by Selpin and Henri Decoin but featuring a different cast.

== Cast ==
- Brigitte Horney as Ellen Fehling / Marianne Fehling
- Karl Ludwig Diehl as Dr. Bruck
- Theodor Loos as Herr von Falck
- Margarete Schön as Frau von Falck
- Waldemar Leitgeb as Dr. Nohl
- Erika von Thellmann as Theres
- Erich Fiedler as Herr Fehling
- Eduard Wesener as Herr Pollnow
- Alice Treff as Lilly Bruck
- Hans Leibelt as Justizrat Lorenz
- Trude Hesterberg as Lulu Mielke
- Walther Jung as Bildhauer Nebel
- Erwin Klietsch as Aloys
- Albert Hörrmann as Ellmos
- Adolf Fischer as Maurer
- Ernst Waldow as Ansager
- Inka Adrian
- Traute Bengen
- Dorrit Merryll
- Alfred Walter

== Bibliography ==
- Hull, David Stewart. Film in the Third Reich: A Study of the German Cinema, 1933-1945. University of California Press, 1969.
- Rentschler, Eric. The Ministry of Illusion: Nazi Cinema and Its Afterlife. Harvard University Press, 1996.
