= Hansi Knoteck =

Austrian film actress (1914–2014)

- Born: Johanna Knoteck; 2 March 1914; Vienna, Austria-Hungary
- Died: 23 February 2014 (aged 99); Eggstätt, Germany
- Occupation: Film actress
- Years active: 1934–1974

Johanna Knoteck, known as Hansi Knoteck (2 March 1914 – 23 February 2014), was an Austrian film actress.

== Selected filmography ==
- Count Woronzeff (1934)
- Hubertus Castle (1934)
- The Gypsy Baron (1935)
- The Saint and Her Fool (1935)
- The Girl from the Marsh Croft (1935)
- Winter in the Woods (1936)
- The Man Who Was Sherlock Holmes (1937)
- Ride to Freedom (1937)
- Diamonds (1937)
- When Women Keep Silent (1937)
- Storms in May (1938)
- The Sinful Village (1940)
- Venus on Trial (1941)
- That Was My Life (1944)
- Border Post 58 (1951)
- Heimat Bells (1952)
- House of Life (1952)
- The Beginning Was Sin (1954)
- The Dark Star (1955)
- The Priest from Kirchfeld (1955)
- The Hunter of Fall (1974)
