= The Man Who Was Sherlock Holmes =

1937 German film directed by Karl Hartl

- German poster for The Man Who Was Sherlock Holmes
- Directed by: Karl Hartl
- Written by: Karl Hartl; Robert Adolf Stemmle
- Produced by: Alfred Greven
- Starring: Hans Albers; Heinz Rühmann; Marieluise Claudius; Hansi Knoteck; Hilde Weissner; Siegfried Schürenberg; Paul Bildt
- Cinematography: Fritz Arno Wagner
- Edited by: Gertrud Hinz-Nischwitz
- Music by: Hans Sommer
- Production company: UFA
- Distributed by: UFA
- Release date: 15 July 1937
- Running time: 112 minutes
- Country: Germany
- Language: German

The Man Who Was Sherlock Holmes (German: Der Mann, der Sherlock Holmes war) is a 1937 German mystery comedy film directed by Karl Hartl and starring Hans Albers, Heinz Rühmann and Marieluise Claudius. The film follows Detective Morris Flynn (Hans Albers) and his assistant Macky McPherson (Heinz Rühmann), masquerading as Sherlock Holmes and Dr Watson, who investigate two attractive sisters, Mary and Jane Berry, and the theft and forgery of valuable postage stamps. It was shot at the Babelsberg Studios in Berlin. The film's sets were designed by the art directors Otto Hunte and Willy Schiller.

== Plot ==
Penniless English detectives Flynn and McPherson travel to the Brussels World's Fair disguised as Sherlock Holmes and Dr. Watson, hoping to find work. With no money for train tickets, they stop the night train to Brussels on open tracks. Surprisingly, the conductors mistake them for the famous duo, as do two shady passengers who flee their compartment. Flynn and McPherson seize the now-empty compartment “for investigative purposes” and interrogate the neighboring passengers—two seamstress sisters, Mary and Jane Berry—on their way to claim the inheritance of their wealthy, recently deceased uncle.

The detectives check into a suite at the prestigious Hotel Palace in Brussels. In the luggage left behind by the fleeing passengers, they discover hidden compartments containing large sums of money in three currencies and encrypted plans. A criminal couple, Madame Ganymare and Monsieur Lapin, also staying at the hotel, attempt to retrieve the money and plans. They break into the detectives’ room but find only a receipt from a costume rental shop. They threaten to expose Flynn and McPherson as impostors unless the receipt is exchanged for the valuables.

News of “Sherlock Holmes’s” arrival spreads, and he is summoned by the police—not to be arrested, but to help solve a baffling case. Four rare Mauritius stamps were stolen from the World's Fair and replaced with forgeries. A ransom note demanding 600,000 francs has already arrived. The deceased Uncle Berry had suggested lending the stamps to the exhibition. The detectives visit his estate, where the executor reports that 200,000 francs in cash are missing. “Holmes” deduces that Berry orchestrated the theft, paid the criminals with the missing cash, and had forged stamps made himself. He ran a secret counterfeiting workshop in the castle. When he tried to back out, the gang sent him a threatening letter, and Berry died of heart failure.

The detectives trace the gang's hideout to a Brussels pawnshop, thanks to the threatening letter. But upon returning to Brussels, they discover they are now wanted by the police. “Holmes” uses one of the wanted posters to infiltrate the gang, pretending he wants to join them. Unfortunately, Monsieur Lapin turns out to be the gang leader. Flynn and McPherson are captured. Lapin suspiciously fiddles with his pocket watch, which “Holmes” notices. He stages a fight and steals the watch. The duo is locked in a coal cellar, where they barricade themselves. Lapin discovers the theft and orders the cellar door to be rammed open. Just in time, Mary Berry alerts the police, who arrive and arrest the entire gang.

Flynn and McPherson are put on trial for impersonation and fraud, accused of deceiving the police and the World's Fair director. They defend themselves by claiming they never explicitly said they were Holmes and Watson. Moreover, they helped justice prevail: they exposed the counterfeiting ring, solved three international bank robberies, returned the stolen money, handed over the decoded plans, and recovered the stolen stamps—which are found hidden in a secret compartment of Lapin's pocket watch. A stamp expert confirms they are genuine.

Only the charge of identity theft remains. At that moment, Arthur Conan Doyle reveals himself in the courtroom. Amused by the entire affair, he declares that Holmes and Watson are fictional characters and retroactively grants Flynn and McPherson permission to use their names—on the condition that he may write a book about them titled The Man Who Was Sherlock Holmes.

The trial is dismissed to thunderous applause. Flynn kisses Mary, and McPherson kisses Jane.

== Critical reception ==
Lexikon des Internationalen Films calls it a swinging, lively comedy. Albers and Rühmann were two longtime major stars of German cinema and are still known for the main song in this movie, Jawoll, meine Herr'n.

Variety reviewed the film for its American release and wrote that, while an American production would have had more "finish", the film had the potential to be a "smash" at the box office. It commented that the film offered its star, Hans Alberts, an opportunity to re-establish his career, as his recent "Don Juan roles" had left his career "nearly finished." It also stated, "Heinz Ruhmann as Dr. Watson, although sharing the honors with Albers, is never overshadowed by the other's strong personality ... as the retiring, modest Watson, he draws the character down to the most minute stroke."

== Release ==
The Man Who Was Sherlock Holmes was released on DVD on 24 March 2009.

== Cast ==
- Hans Albers as Morris Flint
- Heinz Rühmann as Macky McPherson
- Marieluise Claudius as Mary Berry
- Hansi Knoteck as Jane Berry
- Hilde Weissner as Madame Ganymare
- Günther Ballier as Kriminalbeamter
- Paul Bildt as Lachender Mann
- Erich Dunskus as Chef der Kriminalpolizei
- Angelo Ferrari as Gangster Fred im Expresszug
- Lothar Geist as Erwin Wutzke
- Aribert Grimmer as Kriminalbeamter
- Harry Hardt as Freds Kumpel Billy
- Clemens Hasse as Ganove Peter
- Edwin Jürgensen as Prosecutor
- Hans Junkermann as Exzellenz Vangon
- Ernst Legal as Dieter Jean
- Paul Schwed as Der lange Poll
- F.W. Schröder-Schrom as Polizeidirektor
- Willi Schur as Bahnbeamter
- Théo Tony as Kriminalbeamter
- Ernst Waldow as Hoteldetektiv
- Erich Walter as Hoteldirektor
- Heinz Wemper as Verwalter des Lombard-Hauses
- Walter Werner as Dr. Balderin

== Bibliography ==
- R. A. Stemmle: Der Mann, der Sherlock Holmes war. Roman nach dem gleichnamigen Film von R. A. Stemmle und Karl Hartl. Droemer Knaur, München / Zürich 1981, ISBN 3-426-00730-4
- Michael Ross (Hrsg.): Sherlock Holmes in Film und Fernsehen. Ein Handbuch. Baskerville Bücher, Cologne 2003, ISBN 3-930932-03-2
