= Günther Rittau =

German cinematographer

Günther Rittau (born 7 August 1893 in Königshütte (Silesia); died 6 August 1971 in Munich) was a German cinematographer and film director.

After study of science in Berlin, Rittau started his career in 1919 at the documentary-film department of Decla, later at Universum Film AG. He learned the job of camera operator "on the side". From 1924, he was active as a feature cameraman. His experiences with the documentary film production and the production of trick photographs let to the development of his style. Metropolis (1927) and a propaganda movie U-Boote westwärts! (en:U-boats westwards!) (1941, as director) are considered to be among his best artistic achievements. His film The Eternal Tone (1943) about two brothers (a violinist and a violin maker) was considered "artistically valuable" by the Reichsfilmkammer.

After World War II, he did not return to filmmaking until 1954. In 1967, he was awarded the Filmband in Gold. Günther Rittau is buried at the Waldfriedhof cemetery in Munich.

== Filmography ==
=== Cinematographer ===
- The Railway King (1921) (2 parts)
- The Stone Rider (1923)
- Die Nibelungen (1924) (2 parts)
- The Found Bride (1925)
- The Tower of Silence (1925)
- Metropolis (1927)
- The Trial of Donald Westhof (1927)
- Heimkehr (1928)
- Prince or Clown (1928)
- What's Wrong with Nanette? (1929)
- Melody of the Heart (1929)
- Asphalt (1929)
- The Blue Angel (1930)
- Burglars (1930)
- Darling of the Gods (1930)
- Der Kampf mit dem Drachen (1930)
- Bombs on Monte Carlo (1931)
- Captain Craddock (1931)
- Her Grace Commands (1931)
- Caught in the Act (1931)
- Princess, At Your Orders! (1931)
- Storms of Passion (1932)
- A Blonde Dream (1932)
- Happy Ever After (1932)
- Quick (1932)
- The Victor (1932)
- F.P.1 Doesn't Respond (1932)
- Die verlorene Melodie (1933)
- Wie werde ich energisch? (1933)
- Abel mit der Mundharmonika (1933)
- Kind, ich freu' mich auf Dein Kommen (1933)
- Count Woronzeff (1934)
- The Double (1934)
- Liebeslied (1935)
- The Green Domino (1935)
- The Gypsy Baron (1935)
- Winter in the Woods (1936)
- Ride to Freedom (1937)
- Starke Herzen (1937)
- Faded Melody (1938)
- Northern Lights (1938)
- S.O.S. Sahara (1938)
- The Curtain Falls (1939)
- The Hunter's Cross (1954)
- The Fisherman from Heiligensee (1955)
- Children, Mother, and the General (1955)
- The Forest House in Tyrol (1955)
- Die fröhliche Wallfahrt (1956)
- Das Erbe vom Pruggerhof (1956)
- If We All Were Angels (1956)
- Between Munich and St. Pauli (1957)
- Frauen sind für die Liebe da (1957)

=== Director ===
- Brand im Ozean (1939)
- U-Boote westwärts (1941)
- Der Strom (1942)
- The Eternal Tone (also screenplay) (1943)
- Meine vier Jungens (1944)
- Der Scheiterhaufen (1945)
- The Years Pass (1945)
- An Everyday Story (1948)
- Vor uns liegt das Leben (also screenplay) (1948)
