= Arthur Robison =

German film director (1883–1935)

- Born: June 25, 1883; Chicago, Illinois, United States
- Died: October 20, 1935 (aged 52); Berlin, Germany
- Occupations: Film director, screenwriter
- Years active: 1916–1935

Arthur Robison (June 25, 1883 – October 20, 1935) was a German film director and screenwriter of the silent era. He directed 20 films between 1916 and 1935.

== Selected filmography ==
- A Night of Horror (1916)
- What Belongs to Darkness (1922)
- Between Evening and Morning (1923)
- Schatten – Eine nächtliche Halluzination (1923)
- Peter the Pirate (1925)
- Manon Lescaut (1926)
- The Last Waltz (1927)
- Looping the Loop (1928)
- The Informer (1929)
- The Murder Trial of Mary Dugan (1931)
- Young Dessau's Great Love (1933)
- Count Woronzeff (1934)
- Make Me Happy (1935)
- The Student of Prague (1935)
