= Karl Hartl =

Austrian film director

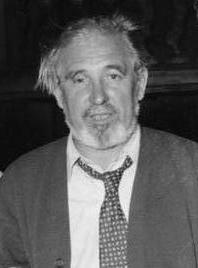
- Born: 10 May 1899; Vienna, Austria-Hungary
- Died: 29 August 1978 (aged 79); Vienna, Austria
- Occupation: Director
- Years active: 1917–1962
- Spouse: Marte Harell

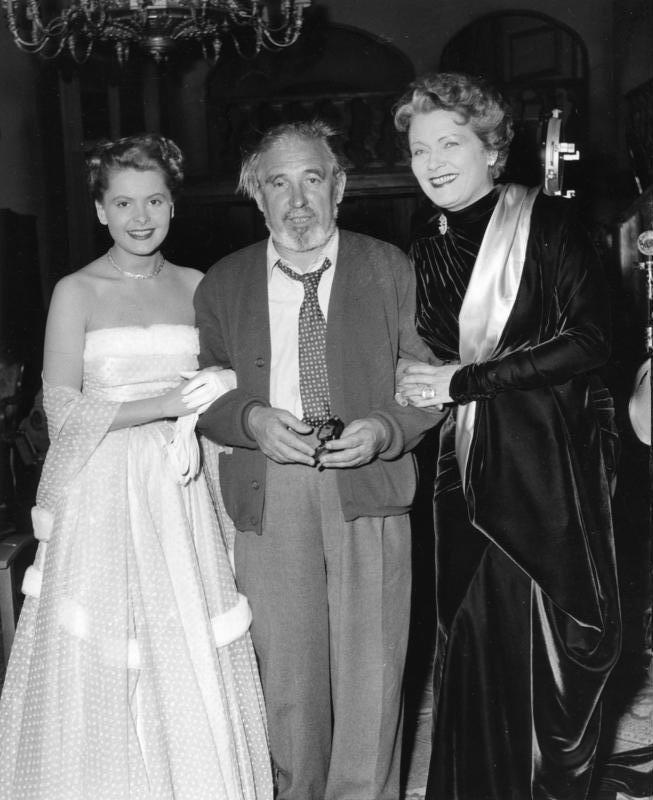
Karl Hartl with Johanna Matz and Olga Chekhova, Göttingen 1953

Karl Hartl (10 May 1899 – 29 August 1978) was an Austrian film director.

== Life ==
Born in Vienna, Hartl began his film career at the Austrian Sascha-Film company of Alexander Kolowrat and from 1919 was assistant to the Hungarian director Alexander Korda. As a production manager, he in the 1920s accompanied Korda to Berlin, until in 1926 he returned to Vienna to work for his former class-mate director Gustav Ucicky.

From 1930 he worked for Universum Film AG (UFA) and debuted as director of Ein Burschenlied aus Heidelberg ("A Fraternity Song from Heidelberg") starring Hans Brausewetter and Willi Forst, with young Billy Wilder as a screenwriter. Together with Luis Trenker he directed the Gebirgsjäger drama Berge in Flammen ("Mountains in Flames") in 1931. He then experimented with other genres, for example the comedy Die Gräfin von Monte Cristo ("The Countess of Monte Cristo") (1932) with Brigitte Helm and Gustaf Gründgens, and in the same year achieved his final breakthrough with the flying drama film F.P.1 antwortet nicht written by Curt Siodmak and produced by Erich Pommer, with Conrad Veidt, Leslie Fenton and Jill Esmond. His lavish science fiction film Gold, released in 1934, is listed today as one of the most successful German films of the genre. In 1937, he directed the popular criminal comedy Der Mann, der Sherlock Holmes war ("The Man Who Was Sherlock Holmes") starring Hans Albers and Heinz Rühmann.

After most of the talented directors, technicians, actors had been forced to leave in the course of the 1938 Anschluss annexation of Austria by Nazi Germany, Hartl became head of production for Wien-Film, the newly created body through which the UFA, and beyond it, Joseph Goebbels, controlled the Austrian film industry. In this role, which he retained until the end of World War II in Europe, Hartl seldom undertook work on individual films himself but was nevertheless involved at a senior level with some of the most significant entertainment films of the Nazi period. He was a member of the Advisory Council (Präsidialrat) of the Reichsfilmkammer. Despite Hartl's professional ties to the regime, Wien-Film made largely propaganda-free entertainment films under Hartl's leadership. Research has pointed to Hartl's sophisticated use of local dialects and references to the Viennese court to subvert fascist expectations.

After 1945 he resumed film-making. On 3 July 1947 he set up in Salzburg, with the support of the Creditanstalt, the film production company Neue Wiener Filmproduktionsgesellschaft. One of his most acclaimed films of this period was Der Engel mit der Posaune ("The Angel with the Trombone") in 1949, which brought together many compatriot Austrian stars: Paula Wessely, Attila and Paul Hörbiger, Oskar Werner and Maria Schell. His later films included Weg in die Vergangenheit ("Way into the Past") from 1954 and Mozart, which entered the 1956 Cannes Film Festival.

Karl Hartl was married to the actress Marte Harell. He was buried in a grave of honor in the Hietzing cemetery, Vienna.

== Selected filmography ==
- The Prince and the Pauper (1920, editor)
- Masters of the Sea (1922, editor)
- A Vanished World (1922, editor)
- The Unknown Tomorrow (1923, editor)
- Tragedy in the House of Habsburg (1924, editor)
- The Convict from Istanbul (1929)
- Hocuspocus (1930)
- The Immortal Vagabond (1930)
- A Student's Song of Heidelberg (1930)
- Mountains on Fire (1931)
- Der Prinz von Arkadien (1932)
- The Countess of Monte Cristo (1932)
- F.P.1 antwortet nicht (1932)
- Her Highness the Saleswoman (1933)
- The Princess's Whim (1934)
- Gold (1934)
- So Ended a Great Love (1934)
- The Gypsy Baron (1935)
- The Emperor's Candlesticks (1936)
- Ride to Freedom (1937)
- The Man Who Was Sherlock Holmes (1937)
- Woman in the River (1939)
- A Mother's Love (1939)
- My Daughter Lives in Vienna (1940)
- Operetta (1940)
- Judgement Day (1940)
- Whom the Gods Love (1942)
- Late Love (1943)
- Dog Days (1944, producer)
- The Angel with the Trumpet (1948)
- The Wonder Kid (1951)
- Der schweigende Mund (1951)
- House of Life (1952)
- A Musical War of Love (1953)
- Everything for Father (1953)
- Walking Back into the Past (1954)
- Mozart (1955)
- Rot ist die Liebe (1956)
- Flying Clipper (1962)
