= Otto Baecker =

German cinematographer

- Born: 7 January 1898; Berlin, German Empire
- Died: 22 May 1970 (aged 72); West Berlin; West Germany
- Occupation: Cinematographer
- Years active: 1923-1958

Otto Baecker (7 January 1898 – 22 May 1970) was a German cinematographer who worked on more than seventy films between 1923 and 1958. He worked on a number of films during the Nazi era including the 1934 science fiction feature Gold.

== Selected filmography ==
- The Lost Shoe (1923)
- The Gentleman Without a Residence (1925)
- The Flame of Love (1930)
- The Man in Search of His Murderer (1931)
- Inquest (1931)
- About an Inquest (1931)
- Storms of Passion (1932)
- A Blonde Dream (1932)
- Happy Ever After (1932)
- Quick (1932)
- The Victor (1932)
- Love Must Be Understood (1933)
- Gold (1934)
- Count Woronzeff (1934)
- The Double (1934)
- The Green Domino (1935)
- The Gypsy Baron (1935)
- Winter in the Woods (1936)
- Ride to Freedom (1937)
- The Mystery of Betty Bonn (1938)
- Between the Parents (1938)
- The Right to Love (1939)
- Her Private Secretary (1940)
- Six Days of Leave (1941)
- The Master Detective (1944)
- Free Land (1946)
- It Began at Midnight (1951)
- Three Days of Fear (1952)
- You Only Live Once (1952)
- Christina (1953)
- Have Sunshine in Your Heart (1953)
- Such a Charade (1953)
- Lost Child 312 (1955)
- Heroism after Hours (1955)
- The Model Husband (1956)

== Bibliography ==
- Schulte-Sasse, Linda. Entertaining the Third Reich: Illusions of Wholeness in Nazi Cinema. Duke University Press, 1996.
