= 1896–97 Hamburg dockworkers' strike =

Strike in the German Empire

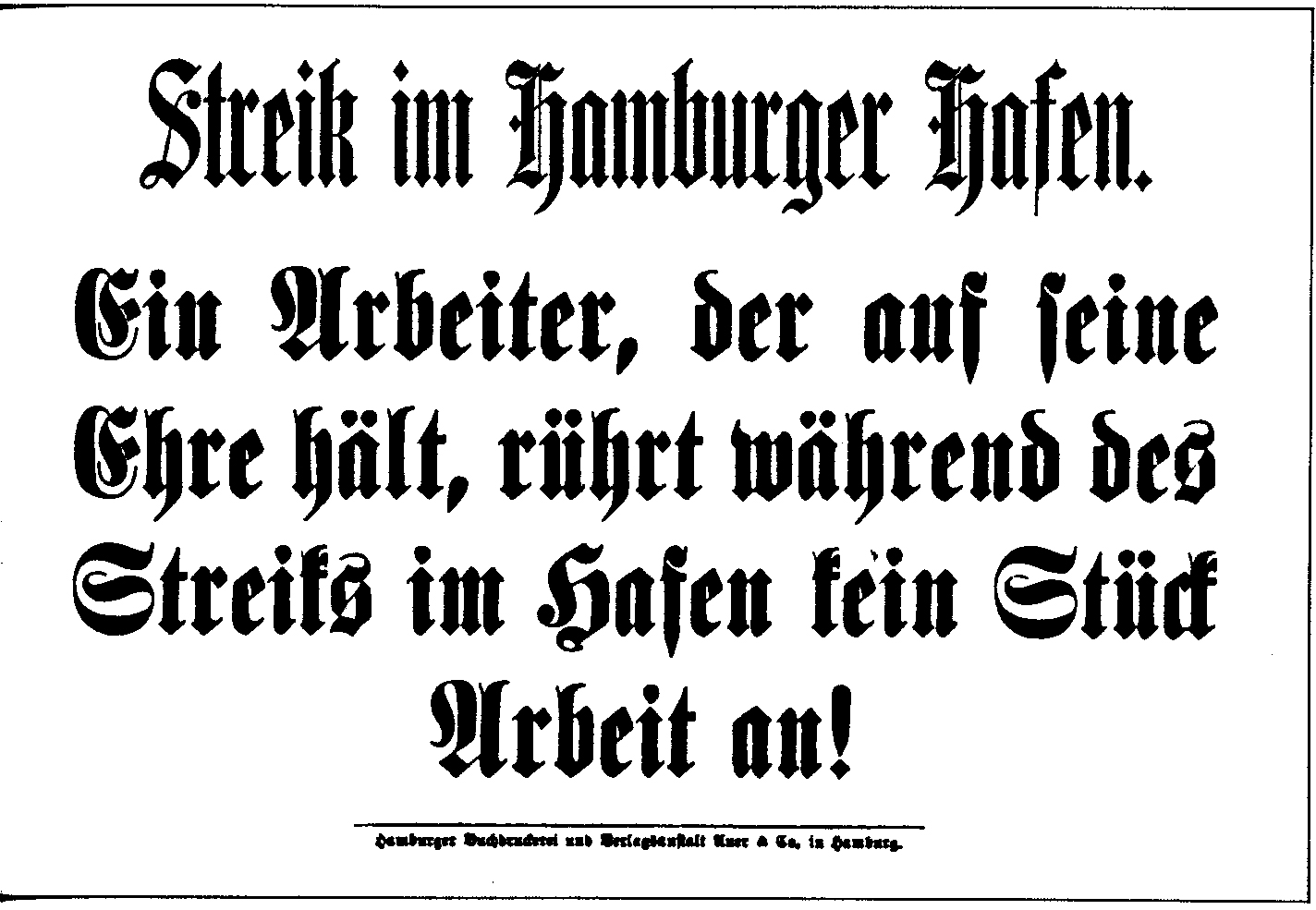
Call for strike action in the form of a flyer

The Hamburg dockworkers' strike of 1896-97 was considered one of the largest labour disputes in the German Empire. It began on November 21, 1896, lasted eleven weeks, involved nearly 17,000 workers at its peak, and ended on February 6, 1897, with the complete defeat of the strikers. The dispute had a significant impact on the Hamburg economy and also caused a stir outside Germany. The events prompted conservatives and the Reich government to attempt a policy of increased repression against social democracy two years later with the prison bill.

== Prerequisites and background ==
=== Significance of the Port of Hamburg ===
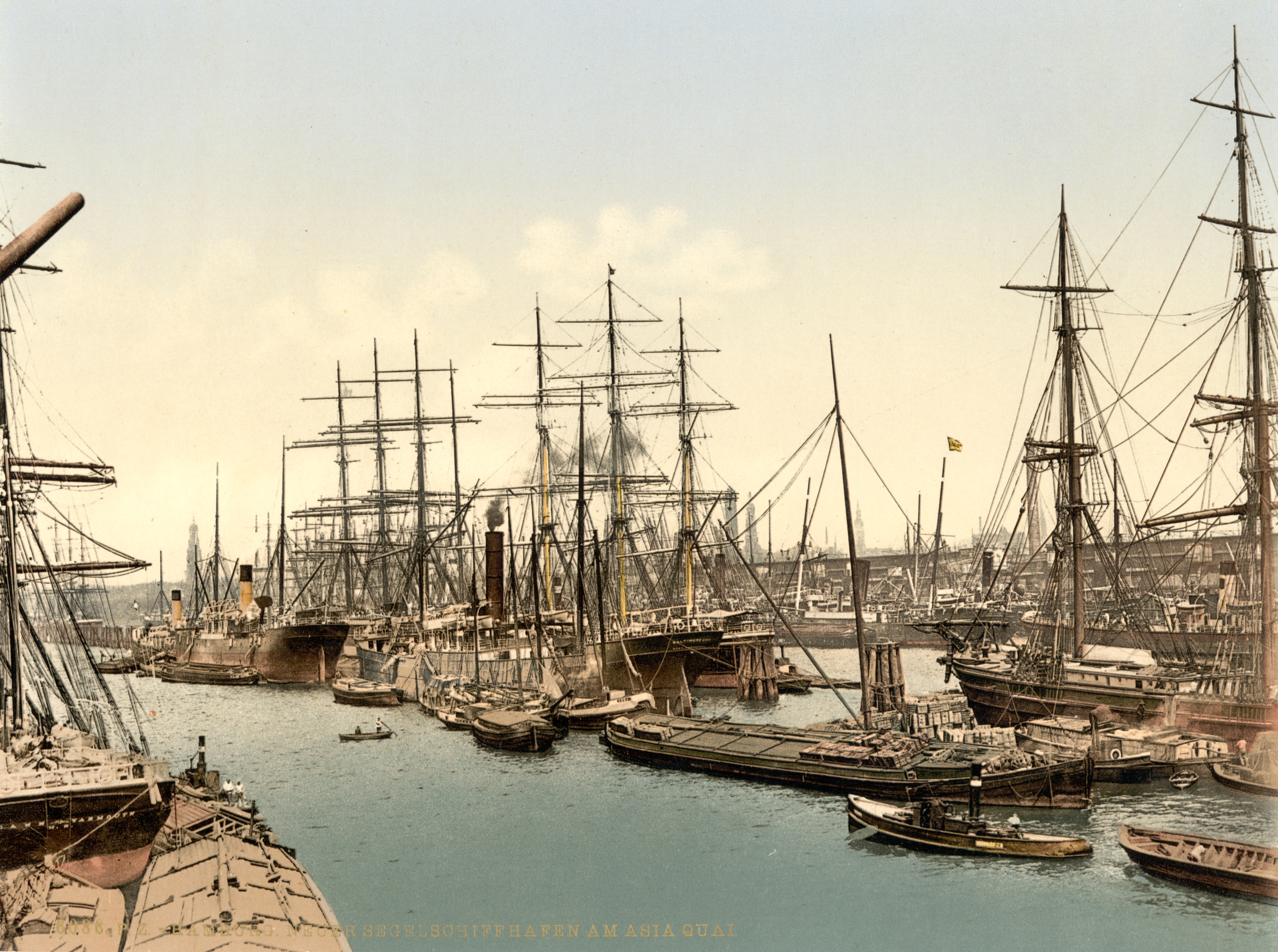
Hamburg: Sailing ship harbor on the Asiakai (around 1890–1900)

Since the mid-19th century, Hamburg had been Germany's leading centre of trade and shipping. The port of the city was its economic hub. Between 1856 and 1886, the number of goods imported by ship to Hamburg tripled, mainly due to intensified trade relations with Latin America after this region broke away from Portugal and Spain. Added to this was emigration to America. This reduced freight rates for goods transported from America to Hamburg, as the cargo space for voyages from Europe to America was already used and paid for.

The economic centre of the port also shaped Hamburg's industry, which was heavily export-oriented. The production of goods with high craftsmanship played a greater role here than in industrial regions where mass production prevailed. Added to this was the manufacture of large goods: ships in Hamburg's shipyards.

The competitiveness of the Port of Hamburg grew during the German Empire. In 1873, the Port of Hamburg accounted for almost 30 percent of Germany's shipping traffic, measured in net registered tons. This made Hamburg the leading port city in Germany. Bremen/Bremerhaven followed far behind with a share of almost 12 percent. Hamburg's share grew to over 40 percent by 1893, reaching more than 44 percent in 1911. The ports on the Weser River, still in second place, were only able to improve their share by half a percentage point by 1911. The great advantage of the Port of Hamburg was its good connections to the hinterland. There was an extensive system of inland waterways and railways to and from Hamburg. From Hamburg's perspective, this hinterland extended beyond Germany's borders. As a transit station, the port was also of great importance for the movement of goods between parts of Central and Eastern Europe and the “New World.” In particular, the flow of goods to and from Austria-Hungary, the Balkan states, Scandinavia, and, to some extent, Russia often passed through Hamburg.

The Hanseatic city drew much of its economic and political power from its port. This also meant that there was potential for losses, especially if the port industry was disrupted, for example, by strikes.

=== Trade union organisation ===
Hamburg was the centre of the socialist trade union movement in Germany. In 1890, the city had 84 trade unions, and almost every group of workers had its own organisation, which together represented more than 30,000 members. Hamburg's prominent position in the German trade union movement was also reflected in the fact that the General Commission of German Trade Unions had its headquarters in the port city, as did a number of central executive committees of individual associations. The Social Democratic Party of Germany (SPD) had also established its stronghold in the city on the Elbe. In 1890, the party won all three of Hamburg's seats in the Reichstag and defended them until the end of the German Empire. However, the Hamburg workers' movement had suffered a heavy defeat in 1896. Six years earlier, there had been attempts in a number of states to strike on May 1 for the introduction of the eight-hour working day or a significant reduction in working hours. In Germany, these conflicts soon concentrated on the Elbe metropolis. However, during the Hamburg May Day clashes, the strikers found themselves facing a “heavily armed and well-organised business bloc whose power and determination could hardly be underestimated.” This power bloc refused to make concessions and responded with mass lockouts and further sanctions. The defeat of the strikers after weeks of industrial action led to a significant decline in membership of the Hamburg trade unions.

The economic downturn was also responsible for this decline in membership. The central dockworkers' union, newly founded in 1891, included all worker groups in the Port of Hamburg and had around 5,000 members that year, but by the following year, it had only 1,800 union members. The Hamburg cholera epidemic of 1892 was partly responsible for this decline. Furthermore, in 1892, the group of Schauerleute took a special organisational path, separating from the central association and founding the Verein der in Hamburg beschäftigten Schauerleute von 1892 (Association of Dock Workers Employed in Hamburg of 1892), an independent, locally based organisation. Criticism of the bureaucracy, centralised structures, the use of membership fees, and the burden on individual members caused by regular membership fees were the reasons given for the split.

=== Differences and similarities between dockworkers ===
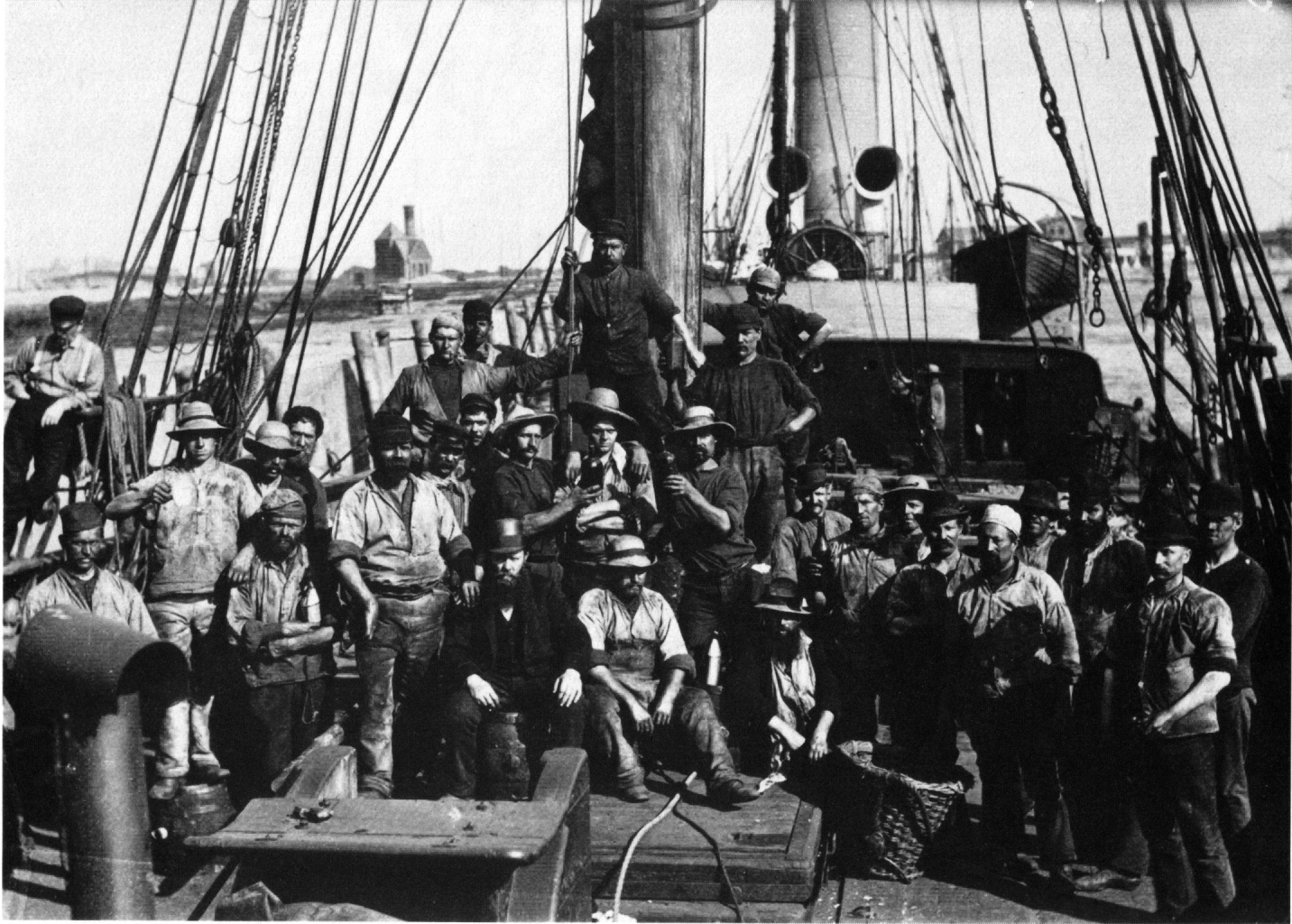
Coal carriers with their “Vizen” (sitting on the barrel). The photo shows so-called “black dockers” – the men worked as coal carriers, organised into groups of six to twelve and led by a Vizen, who acted as a foreman and also as the right-hand man of the “Baas,” i.e., the entrepreneur who employed the dockers. Photo by Johann Hamann, 1899.

The dockworkers were a heterogeneous group. At least 15 different occupational groups emerged as a result of the different activities. After the largest group, the stevedores, the barge skippers were the next largest group in terms of numbers. They transported goods by water to and from seagoing vessels. They used so-called barge boats for this purpose. Although the importance of barge boat operations declined from the 1860s onwards, as ships were increasingly loaded and unloaded at the newly built quays rather than “in the stream,” this trade remained the most important branch of Hamburg's port shipping. Even ships moored at the quay were unloaded and loaded on the water side by barge operators so that the laytime, which was unproductive for shipowners, was kept as short as possible. Quay workers were also a large occupational group. Their responsibility was to load cargo from ships into warehouses on the quays or onto wagons or railway cars for immediate onward transport. Warehouse workers moved the goods in the warehouses and loaded the barges that took the goods to the ships. In addition to these occupational groups, there were others such as coal workers, grain workers, boiler cleaners, ship cleaners, ship painters, and machinists. In a broader sense, there were also approximately 13,000 seafarers of various ranks and occupations who were resident in Hamburg.

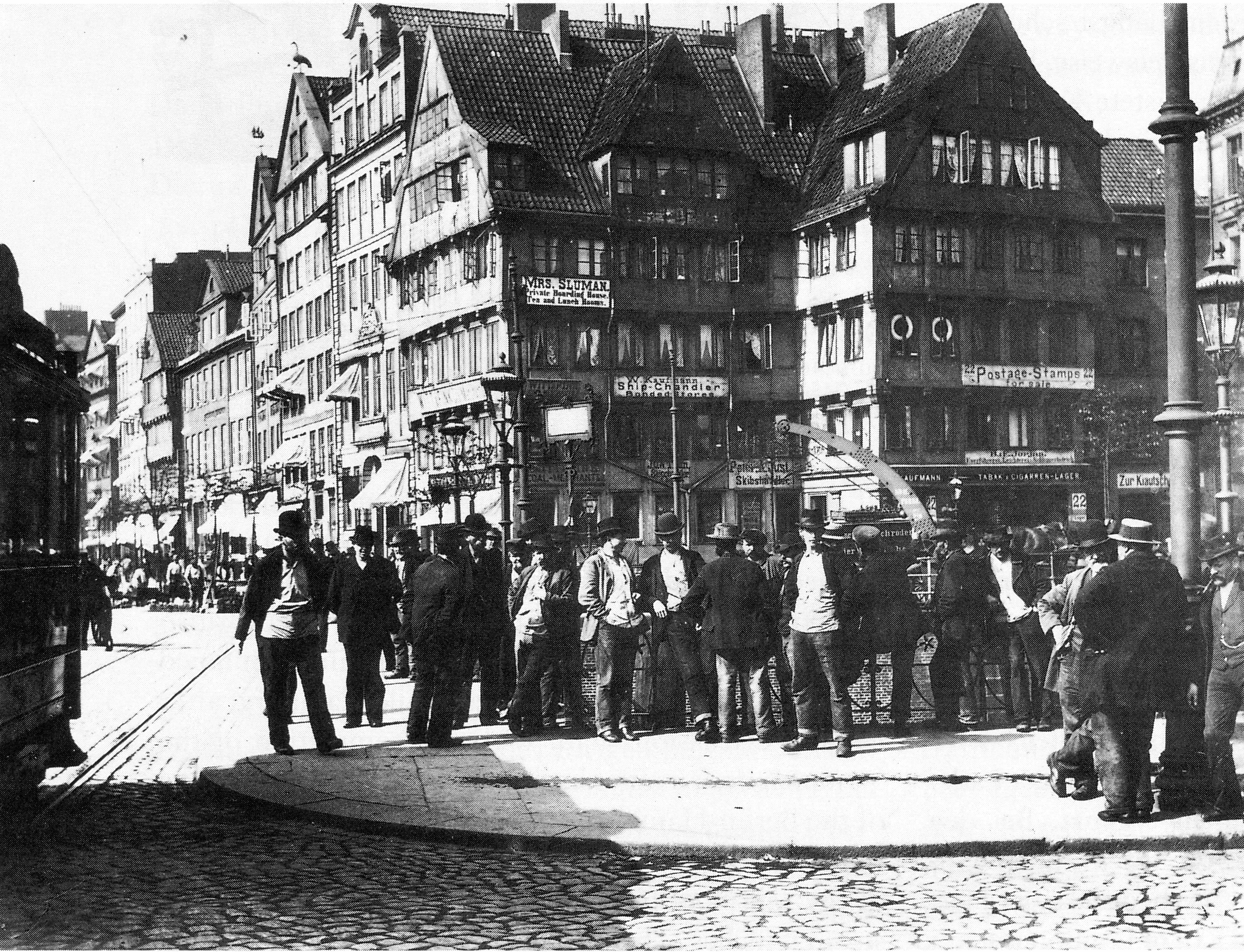
Dockworkers waiting for work at the Baumwall. The houses in the background served as lodgings for sailors and as harbour taverns. Photo by Johann Hamann, 1899.

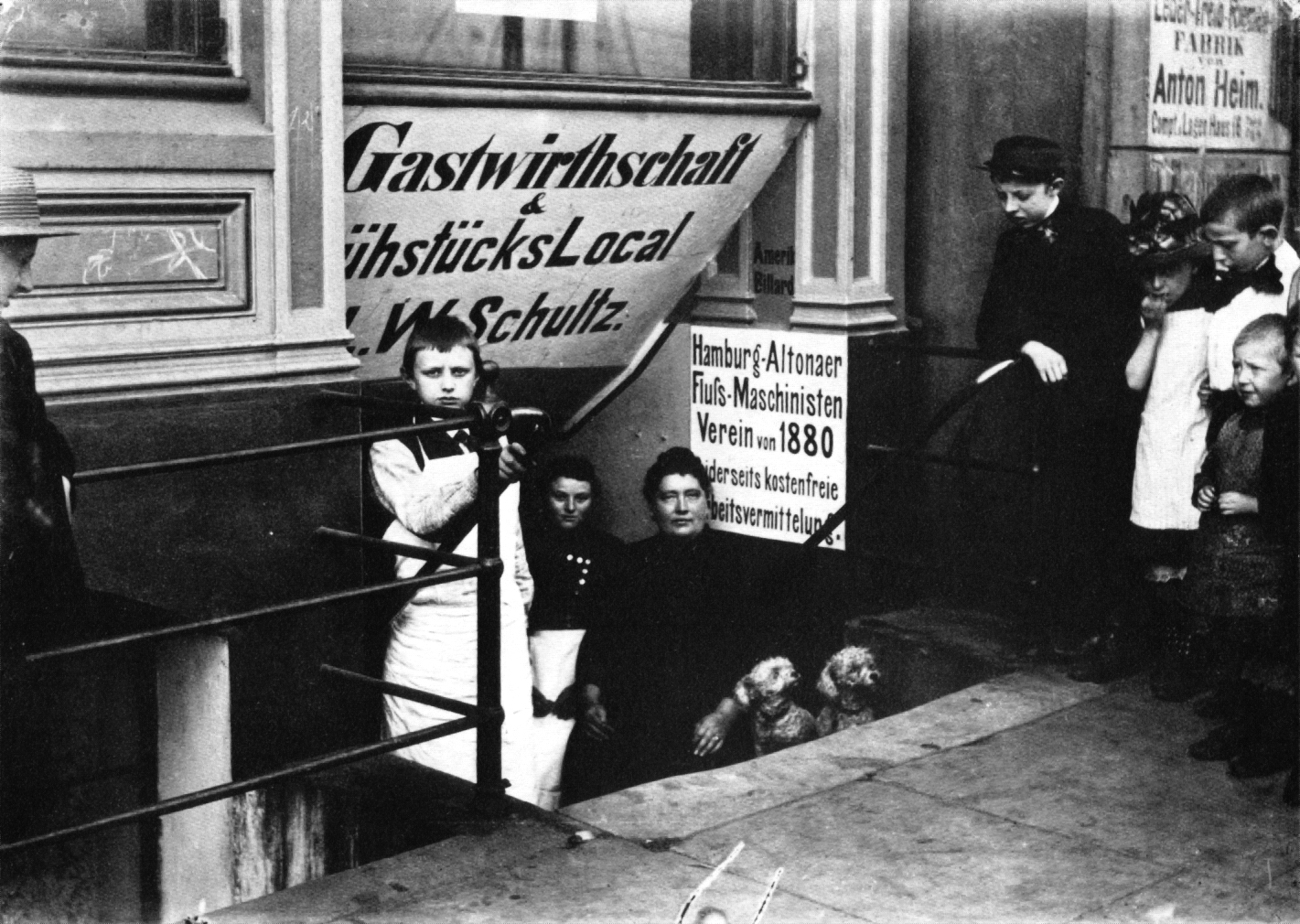
“Gastwirtschaft & FrühstücksLocal L.W. Schultz” in the street “An den Vorsetzen” near the harbor. Like many others, this harbour pub served as an employment agency, in this case for the “Hamburg-Altonaer Fluß-Maschinisten Verein von 1880” (Hamburg-Altona River Engineers' Association of 1880). Photo by Johann Hamann, 1899.

Despite these internal differences, there were a number of similarities. Workers were often exposed to high levels of physical strain, frequently in environments that were hazardous to their health and prone to accidents. Work was carried out at all hours of the day and night, and in all seasons. Many of the workers also came from the Gängeviertel, a cramped residential area near the port. The vast majority were unskilled and had no permanent employment. The exceptions were the boatmen and engineers, whose jobs required several years of training. Other characteristics of the work were extremely short employment contracts and abrupt changes between unemployment and days of uninterrupted work, which could last up to 72 hours during peak periods. Only skilled workers and state dock workers were unaffected by these vicissitudes. The lack of a regulated, officially controlled employment service made the situation even worse. Workers were often recruited in port taverns, which remained the “actual centres of employment” well into the 20th century. The chance of employment, therefore, depended on consumption and personal relationships with innkeepers and agents. Shipowners and merchants no longer selected the workers needed in the port themselves, but instead commissioned intermediaries known as Baase and their foremen, called Vizen. In addition, some business associations in Hamburg had started to set up their own employment records. They hoped this would allow them to consistently exclude unpopular workers from employment. The “Hamburg system” of employer-dominated records spread from the Hanseatic city throughout Germany. These forms of job placement took place in a labour market that was always characterised by a significant surplus of workers. Another common feature of the workforce was its low level of unionisation, which was mainly due to the lack of relevant vocational training and high staff turnover. The instability of employment conditions also resulted in a comparatively high propensity to strike among dockworkers. As day labourers, they did not have to fear losing their jobs or their regular income if a strike was limited to a few days, unlike workers in permanent employment. The relatively high propensity to strike was also due to the limited influence of the trade unions, which regarded strikes as a last resort and preceded them with a long and complicated internal decision-making process.

=== Declining standard of living ===
The wage agreements for the Port of Hamburg dated back mainly to the 1880s. There were hardly any increases after that, but reductions were more frequent. The pace of work had increased since then, as had the cost of living. The customs union of Hamburg in 1888 led to a series of price increases, some of them massive. The free port created in the same year led to the demolition of apartments near the port, with the land now intended for industrial and commercial use. The homes of around 24,000 people disappeared. Rents for the remaining apartments near the port rose dramatically. A large number of those employed in the port had to find accommodation in distant districts such as Eimsbüttel, Winterhude, Barmbek, Hamm, or Billwerder. Rents were also higher there across the board, and commuting times to the port became significantly longer.

== Course ==
=== Prologue ===
The opportunity for an improvement in income only arose when the economy picked up significantly in the spring of 1896. Unemployment fell noticeably, union membership rose, freight rates doubled, and contemporary observers described a significant grain boom in August, which led to many ships crowding the harbour. The balance sheets of shipowners showed considerable profits. The piecework dockworkers responded to the improved economic conditions in September and October with two short strikes, both of which ended in victory for them. The strikes were organised by the local union Verein der Schauerleute von 1892 (Association of Dockworkers of 1892), chaired by Johann Döring. Other groups of dockworkers also successfully went on strike for higher wages during these two months, including coal workers, grain workers, quay workers, and a subgroup of ship cleaners.

The tense situation was exacerbated by the arrest and expulsion of the English dockworkers' leader Tom Mann, who was also well known in Germany and had wanted to promote the unionisation of dockworkers in Hamburg and Altona in mid-September 1896. Adolph von Elm, a Hamburg trade union leader and member of the Reichstag who was supposed to translate Mann's speech, stepped in as a speaker and reported on the arrest. This measure, initiated by Hamburg's police senator Gerhard Hachmann, was also widely regarded among the unorganised dockworkers as an unacceptable and insulting restriction of freedom of association. As a result, the expulsion had the opposite effect to that intended: events focusing on Mann's treatment were very well attended, and wage and working conditions soon became a topic of discussion. Occasionally, speakers even called for the defeat of 1890 to be avenged.

=== Start and extent of the strike ===
The centralised dockworkers' union was reluctant to take strike action, as the leaders of this union considered the level of union membership too low to be able to carry out successful strikes. They also feared an army of strike breakers, as seasonal layoffs of workers in agriculture and construction were imminent. On November 12, 1896, a meeting of union members rejected a show of solidarity with general cargo workers who were planning to strike. Four days later, however, the mood changed. At another meeting, the majority of those present voted against the advice of all union officials and in favour of supporting the general cargo workers. After another four days, on November 20, the decision was made to launch the major strike that went down in history as the Hamburg dockworkers' strike: with an overwhelming majority, the members of the dockworkers' union also voted to go on strike starting on November 21. The employers had previously signalled their agreement to a general wage increase. At the same time, however, they wanted to reduce the bonuses paid for handling hazardous goods. At that point, no one expected the strike to develop into a labour dispute lasting several weeks. It was generally assumed that the strike would last between eight and 14 days.

On November 21, 1896, almost all dockworkers stopped work. The other groups of workers employed in the port also went on strike in the following days and made demands that were strictly rejected by the employers. These demands varied from one group of workers to another. They can essentially be divided into those relating to basic wages, wage supplements, and working hours. In addition, there were calls for collective bargaining agreements to regulate working conditions—in 1896, the unions were by no means regarded by employers as negotiating partners in these matters. The elimination of the Baasen was also demanded. The employers' negative responses accelerated the wave of walkouts. By the end of November, more than 8,700 strikers had been counted. On December 4, the number had already risen to almost 12,000. On December 9, the figure stood at 14,500, and on December 21, it exceeded 16,400.

=== Organisation of the strike ===
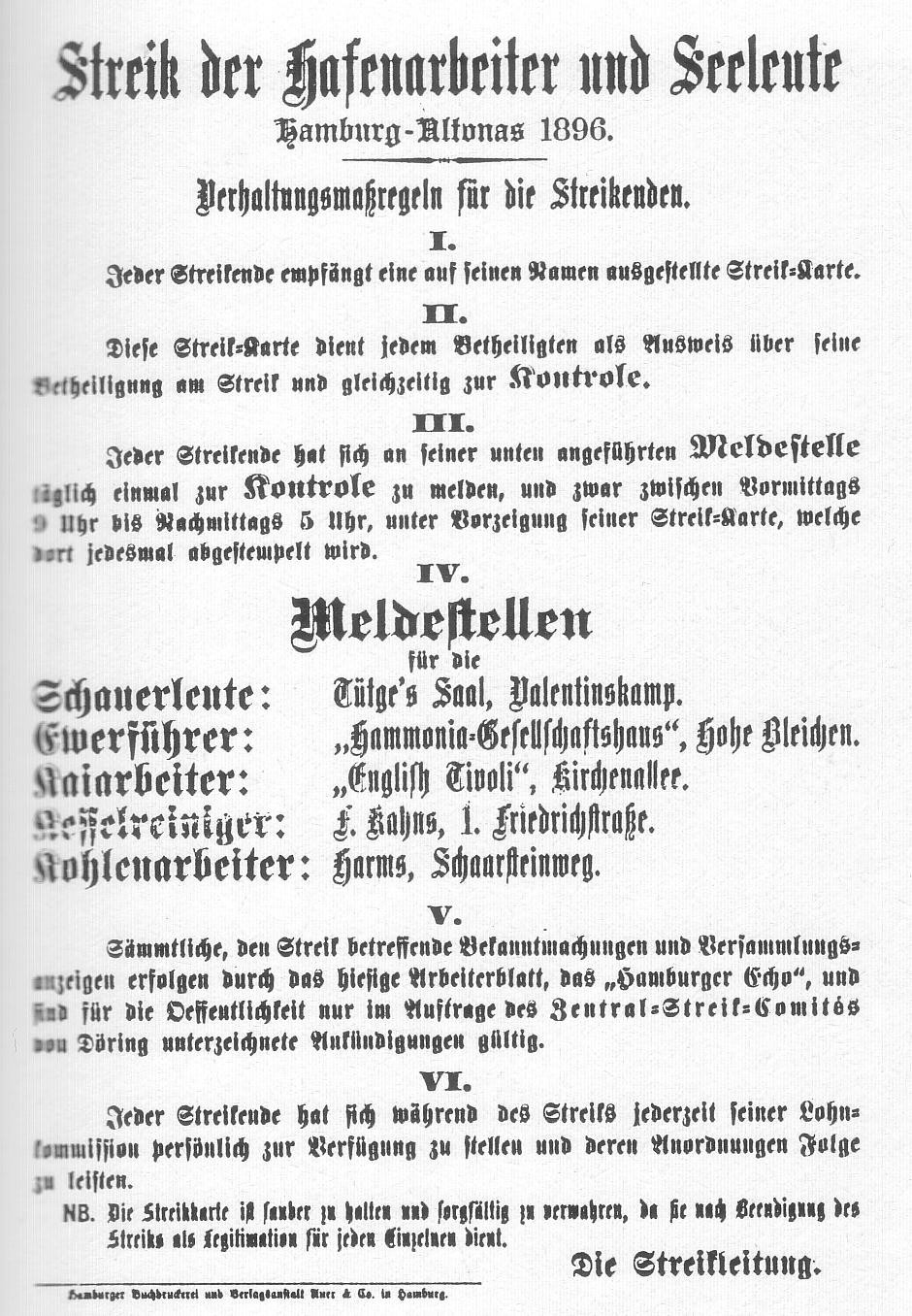
Leaflet from November 1896 with instructions on how to behave and the significance of the strike cards

The individual professional groups elected strike committees, which came together to form a central strike committee of around 70 members. This committee was headed by a five-member executive board, with local politician Döring as its chairman. Representatives of the Hamburg trade union cartel, i.e., the local trade union umbrella organisation, were not involved at the outset, nor were representatives of the SPD. However, they joined when the first attempts at mediation were made. These prominent labour leaders included Carl Legien, Hermann Molkenbuhr, Karl Frohme, and Adolph von Elm. Each striker received a strike card that had to be stamped every day. Picket lines were set up in the port to ensure that the strike was carried out consistently. At the same time, barges were chartered to carry out patrols.

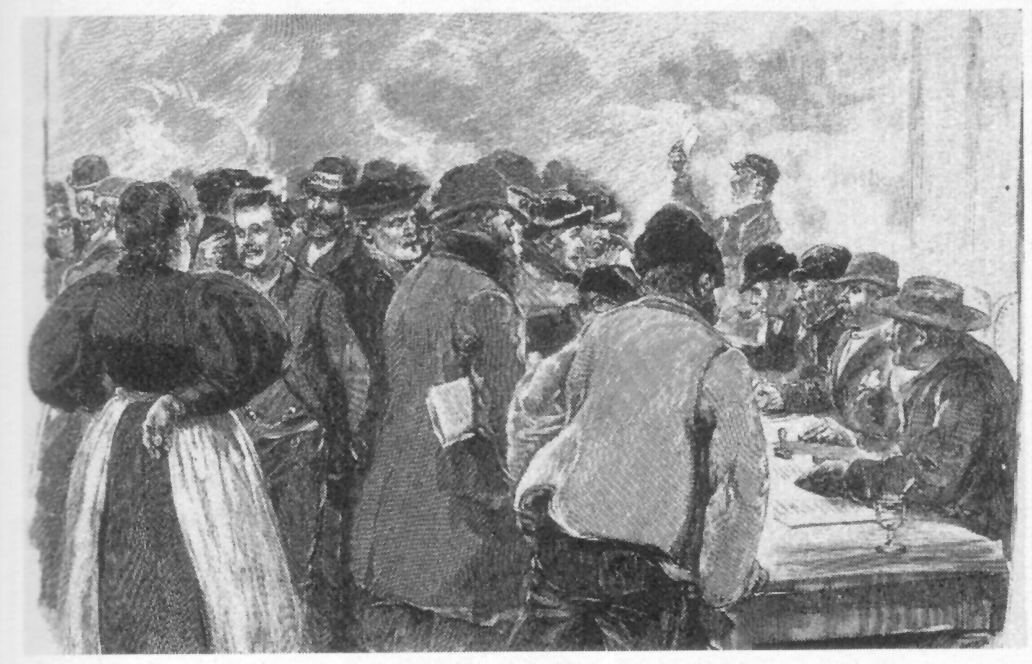
Stamping strike cards, wood engraving by Emil Limmer

The organisation of financial support was decisive for the intensity of the strike. The financial resources of the dockworkers' union were insufficient to sustain a strike for long, and the resources of the local organisation of dockworkers were even more limited. Although the trade union cartel was not involved in calling the strike and worked consistently in the following weeks to limit and defuse the conflict, it recognised the strike on November 27. It asked the other unions for financial support. These measures were not limited to the Hanseatic city; donations were collected throughout the Reich. Support for the strikers reached a level never before seen in Germany. Donations even arrived from abroad, albeit in limited quantities—many foreign dockworkers' unions were not pleased about the outbreak of the strike in Hamburg. They feared that it could damage the development of the international dockworkers' movement. These appeals were not only successful among the workers' social milieu. Many small shopkeepers also supported the strike because dockworkers made up the majority of their customers. Similarly, the “flying merchants,” who made their living selling their wares on barges and in the harbour area, took sides. They had already declared their solidarity with the strikers on November 25. Even the bourgeois National Socialist Association expressed its solidarity with the dockworkers and organised a collection among its supporters, which raised a total of 10,600 marks. Calls for financial solidarity led to each striker receiving strike pay of 8 marks per week from December 2, 1896, with an additional mark for spouses and each child. These support rates were increased twice during the strike. For the duration of the strike, it was important that the amount of strike pay exceeded the support rates paid by the public poor relief authorities. Nevertheless, the strike pay was not generous, as a comparison with day labourers shows. At that time, day labourers earned between 2 marks for boiler cleaners and 4.20 marks for dockworkers.

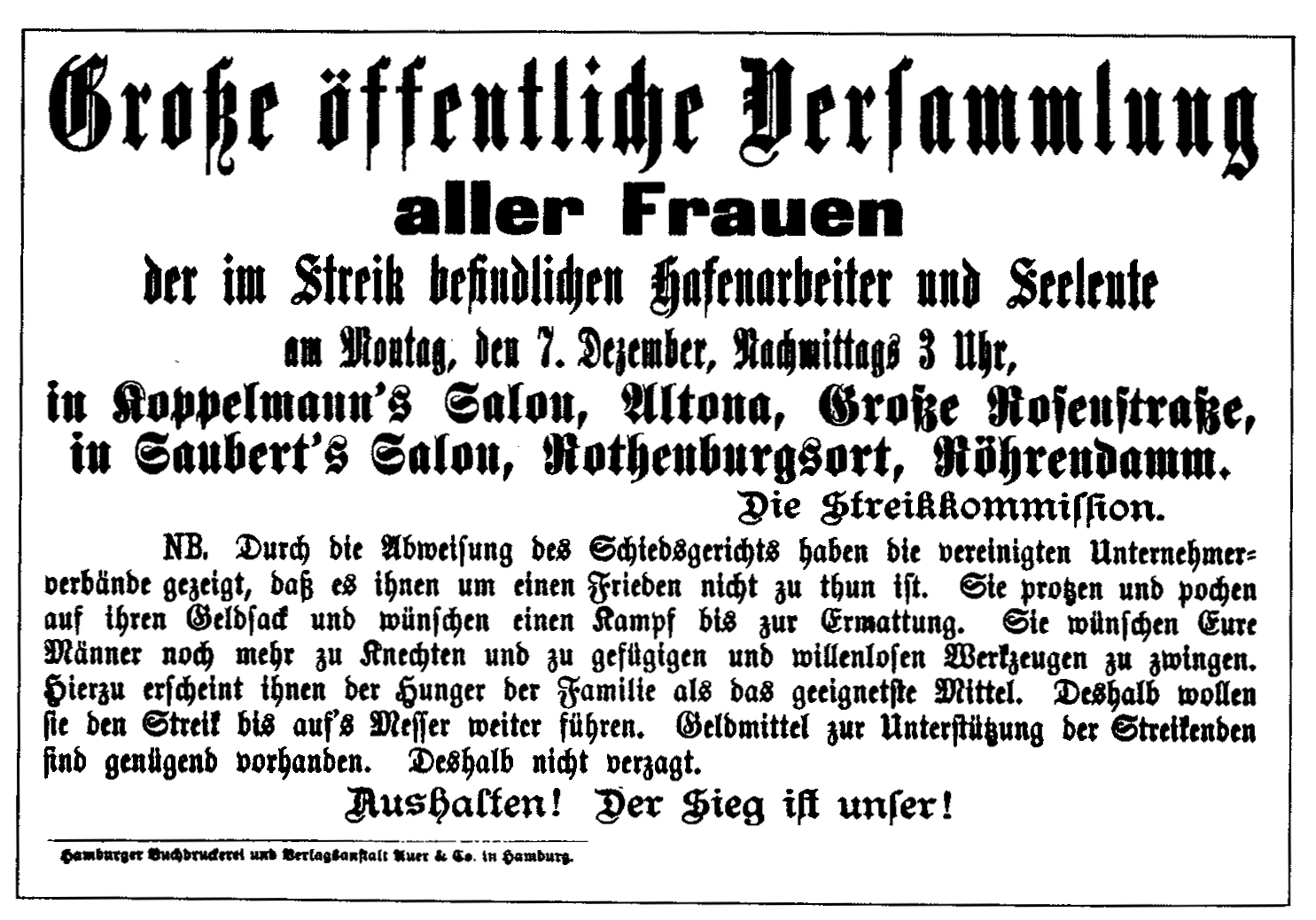
The wives of dockworkers were called to separate meetings. Here is a flyer from early December 1896 announcing meetings in Altona and Rothenburgsort.

Another factor in the organisation of the strike was the targeted appeal to women at mass rallies organised specifically for this purpose. The aim was to prevent conflicts within families and thus prevent the strike front from crumbling. This tactic was still relatively new in the context of labour disputes and, in retrospect, proved successful from the officials' point of view. Luise Zietz, who had herself been an activist at meetings of women dockworkers, praised it at the SPD party conference held in Hamburg in October 1897.

=== Reactions in the business community ===
The response of the business community was not primarily determined by the employers directly affected, i.e., the shipowners and ship operators. Instead, it was shaped by the policy of the local employers' association (Arbeitgeberverband Hamburg-Altona), which had been founded four years earlier. Within this association, the key players speculated that the strike would quickly collapse, as they were well aware of the financial weakness of the relevant trade unions. For this reason, the strikers' demands were strictly rejected. Even when financially hard-hit shipowners pushed for a relaxation of the rejection policy, they were unable to prevail. On the employers' side, Hermann Blohm, head of the Blohm + Voss shipyard, took the lead and declared the dispute to be a fundamental power struggle. His goal was not to settle the conflict, but to achieve unconditional victory. The unions would never be recognised as negotiating partners.

In order to maintain operations in the port at a minimum and to undermine the strikers' fighting spirit, the entrepreneurs recruited strike breakers from Germany and abroad. On December 7, 1896, around 2,000 strikebreakers were working in the port. The employers only achieved their goals to a limited extent: some of those recruited were prevented from starting work by the strikers using violence—for example, workers from the Woermann Line held 39 strike breakers from Magdeburg on board the Lothar Bohlen for several days; others were persuaded not to start work by the arguments of the picketers. The work productivity of those recruited was also significantly lower, as they were unfamiliar with the manual labour involved in port work. Albert Ballin, director of the Hamburg-Amerikanische Packetfahrt-Actien-Gesellschaft (HAPAG), considered only half of the temporary workers employed by his company to be suitable. As a result, chaotic conditions prevailed on the quays and in the sheds. The number of ships waiting to be loaded and unloaded steadily increased. The consequences for other sectors of the economy were considerable, as there was now a shortage of raw materials and intermediate products that were piling up in the ships, on the quays, and in the sheds. Complaints about delivery delays poured in from all sides.

=== Solidarity with entrepreneurs ===
Kaiser Wilhelm II was the most prominent advocate of an uncompromising policy toward the strikers. On November 27, 1896, he visited Alfred von Waldersee, who commanded the IX Army Corps as commanding general in neighbouring Altona. The emperor wanted “energetic intervention” and encouraged his general before his departure: “Just go ahead and do it, even without asking.” A few days later, he instructed the Prussian Minister of Justice, Karl von Schönstedt, to initiate public prosecutors' investigations against Social Democratic members of parliament who had organised solidarity measures with the strikers in Hamburg in the port cities. He instructed his Minister of War, Heinrich von Goßler, who had been in office since mid-August 1896, to be prepared to impose a state of siege.

The imperial government expressed similar sentiments. Karl Heinrich von Boetticher, State Secretary in the Reich Ministry of the Interior, claimed before the Reichstag in early December 1896 that the dockworkers' strike was unfounded. He based his argument on wage tables provided to him by employers. Carl Ferdinand von Stumm-Halberg, a major entrepreneur in the Saarland mining industry and free-thinking conservative politician, stirred up sentiment against the striking workers in the Reichstag. He considered this strike to be the work of the SPD and the English trade unions and dismissed any thoughts of a negotiated solution as “nonsense.” The Association of German Iron and Steel Industries, an important lobby group representing heavy industry in the Rhine and Ruhr regions, publicly praised the service rendered to the fatherland by Hamburg employers, arguing that “any even apparent success of the workers” would “increase the danger of internationalist aspirations within their organisations in the most threatening manner.”

=== Mediation efforts ===
The Hamburg Senate initially remained passive. Until the end of November 1896, it did not formally address the strike. However, the police occupied the port area and the quays from November 26 onwards. Police posts were also set up in front of employment agencies to prevent strike agitation, in accordance with the wishes of the authorities. At the same time, around 1,000 Italians who were willing to work as strike breakers were refused entry. The shipowners' request to deploy naval units was also rejected. Overall, the authorities' line during this phase of the strike was to avoid escalation.

The initiative for an agreement did not come from the Senate, but from well-known figures. Senator Gerhard Hachmann, responsible for the police, Siegmund Hinrichsen, President of the Hamburg Parliament, and Dr. Noack, Chairman of the Hamburg Commercial Court, launched an attempt at compromise on November 29, 1896: An arbitration tribunal was to be established. In addition to themselves, this body was to include an employer representative and four representatives of the workers. All parties were to recognise in advance as binding any decisions supported by at least six members of the arbitration tribunal. The workers agreed to this proposal. The employers, however, did not. They considered it the wrong signal to put workers' representatives on an equal footing with representatives of the bourgeoisie. An arbitration tribunal would also have meant recognising the strikers' demands as justified in principle, even if the details of wages and working conditions still had to be negotiated. Instead, the employers continued to speculate that time would work against the strikers. They hoped for what the strikers feared: that strike pay would slowly dry up, that the strike breakers would settle into their jobs, and that the supply of labour would increase significantly due to the cold season. The entrepreneurs publicly stated that they did not view the conflict as a dispute over economic interests, but rather as a “power struggle.” In this dispute, they were interested in a decisive victory, not partial success.

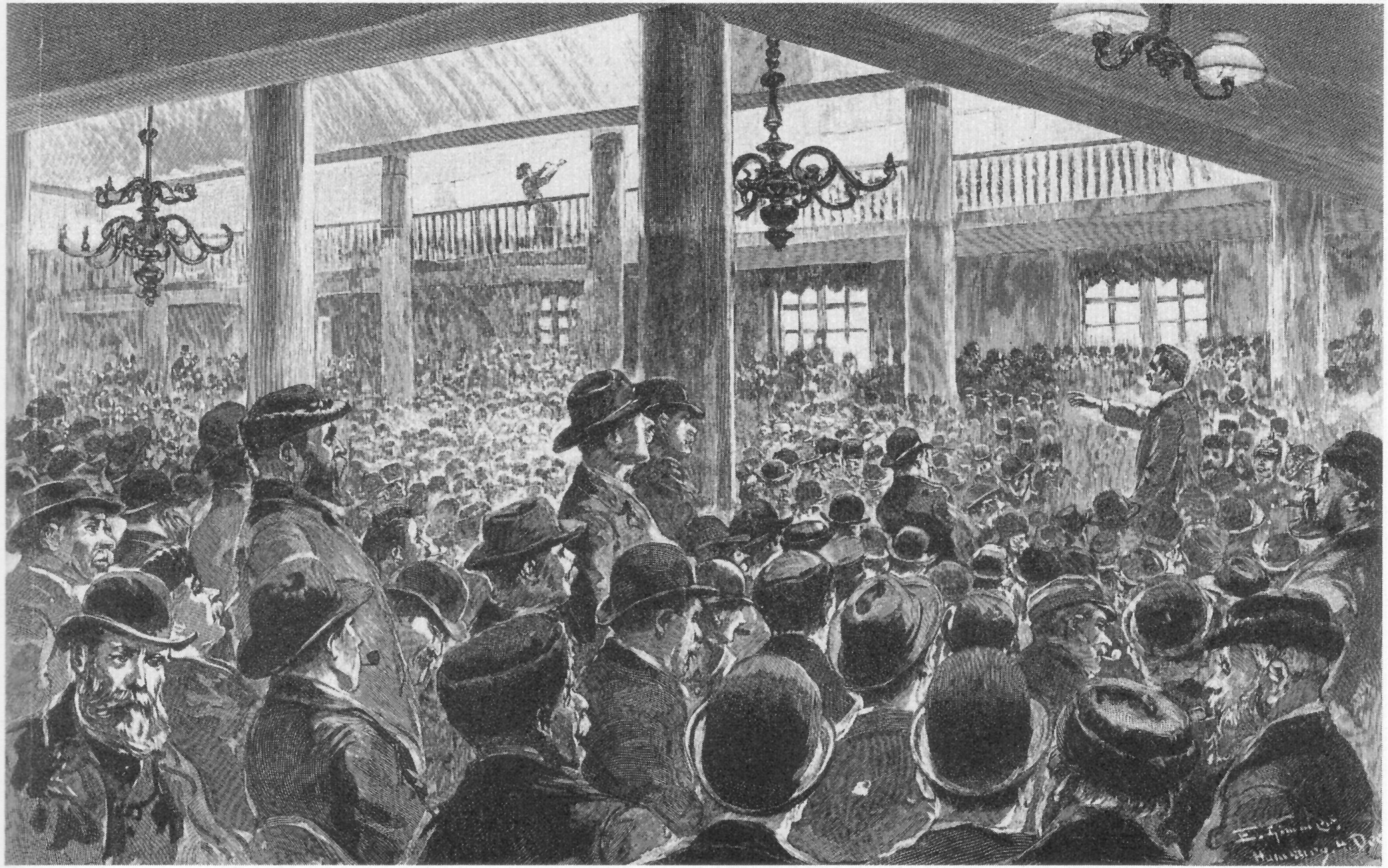
December 4, 1896: Meeting of the Staatskai workers in the English Tivoli hall in St. Georg. Wood engraving by Emil Limmer, published in the Hamburger Illustrierte Zeitung in 1896.

This statement embittered the strikers and reduced their willingness to compromise. Instead, the strike leadership called for a general strike across the entire port. The hardening of positions, the length of the strike, the obvious problems in the port, and the financial consequences of the strike prompted the Senate to intervene. On December 4, 1896, it appointed a commission of four senators—Hachmann, William Henry O'Swald, Johann Heinrich Burchard, and Alexander Kähler—to work out a proposed solution. This initiative met with interest among the strike leaders. However, they were keen to ensure that the workers' right to form coalitions would be recognised as part of the compromise. The employers, however, remained firm in their opposition. Shipbuilder Hermann Blohm, one of the spokesmen for the employers, made it clear that the strike should be seen as a conflict between the state-supporting business community and the Social Democrats. A crushing blow must be dealt to this party, with the help of the Senate. Blohm wanted the Senate to issue a statement strongly condemning the strikers' actions. The Senate did not comply with this demand, but instead explored possibilities for issuing a statement calling for a return to work and negotiations. The Senate had in mind a statement saying that, once work had resumed, it would launch an investigation into the strikers' complaints and demands. Employers should be called upon to reinstate all strikers and dismiss any non-union strikebreakers brought in from outside. The strike leaders disagreed with this proposal, as did the employers. The workers' leaders emphasised that such a call could in no way guarantee the reinstatement of the strikers and the absence of repressive measures against them by the employers. They argued that it would be futile to call for a return to work on such an uncertain basis. For their part, the employers once again rejected the idea of direct negotiations with the unions. At the same time, they were not prepared to commit to reinstating striking workers. For them, the only option was the Senate investigation that had been announced, provided that it also took the interests of the employers into account. However, they demanded that the Senate publicly condemn the workers' industrial action. The Senate rejected this request by the employers on December 9, 1896, by a majority of ten votes to seven.

=== Strike continues and winter sets in ===
The strike continued. However, the authorities were now increasingly siding with the employers. They banned the strikers from entering the free port area. Wherever strikers gathered in groups or remained in the vicinity of those willing to work, they were dispersed by the police. On December 14, the Senate banned door-to-door collections for the strikers. However, the unions circumvented this measure by distributing statements in which those willing to donate asked the collectors to come to their homes regularly to collect the donations. Nevertheless, frustration and radicalism among the workers grew. Some resorted to acts of sabotage. Time and again, loaded barges, launches, and other watercraft drifted leaderless in the harbour basin and on the Elbe River at night. Strikers were suspected of sinking a steamboat that was supposed to provide emergency quarters for strikebreakers. A restaurant owned by a shipyard boss was vandalised.

In this situation, the strike leaders approached the Senate again on December 16, 1896, and asked for mediation. The employers countered by ruling out any arbitration solution, which would have been a victory for the strikers. They insisted on an immediate end to the strike and were not prepared to enter into talks before that. The Senate fell in line with the employers. On December 18, it also publicly demanded an immediate end to the strike, saying that only then could an investigation into the working conditions in the port take place. The Senate made no concessions to the workers. Nevertheless, the strike leaders decided to recommend ending the strike. They foresaw a decline in strike readiness. They also feared that they would have to take out loans to finance the strike, which would significantly limit their ability to strike in the future. Furthermore, they expected police action to enforce the end of the strike and thus a defeat that would paralyse the workforce for years. The strike leaders were unable to push through this recommendation at the strike meetings. Only a minority of 3,671 workers voted to end the strike. They were mainly dockworkers and tugboat operators who feared losing their permanent jobs. On December 19, the majority—7,262 people—rejected the recommendation as capitulation. They did not believe that there would be no repression, nor did they expect anything substantial from a Senate commission to investigate working conditions.

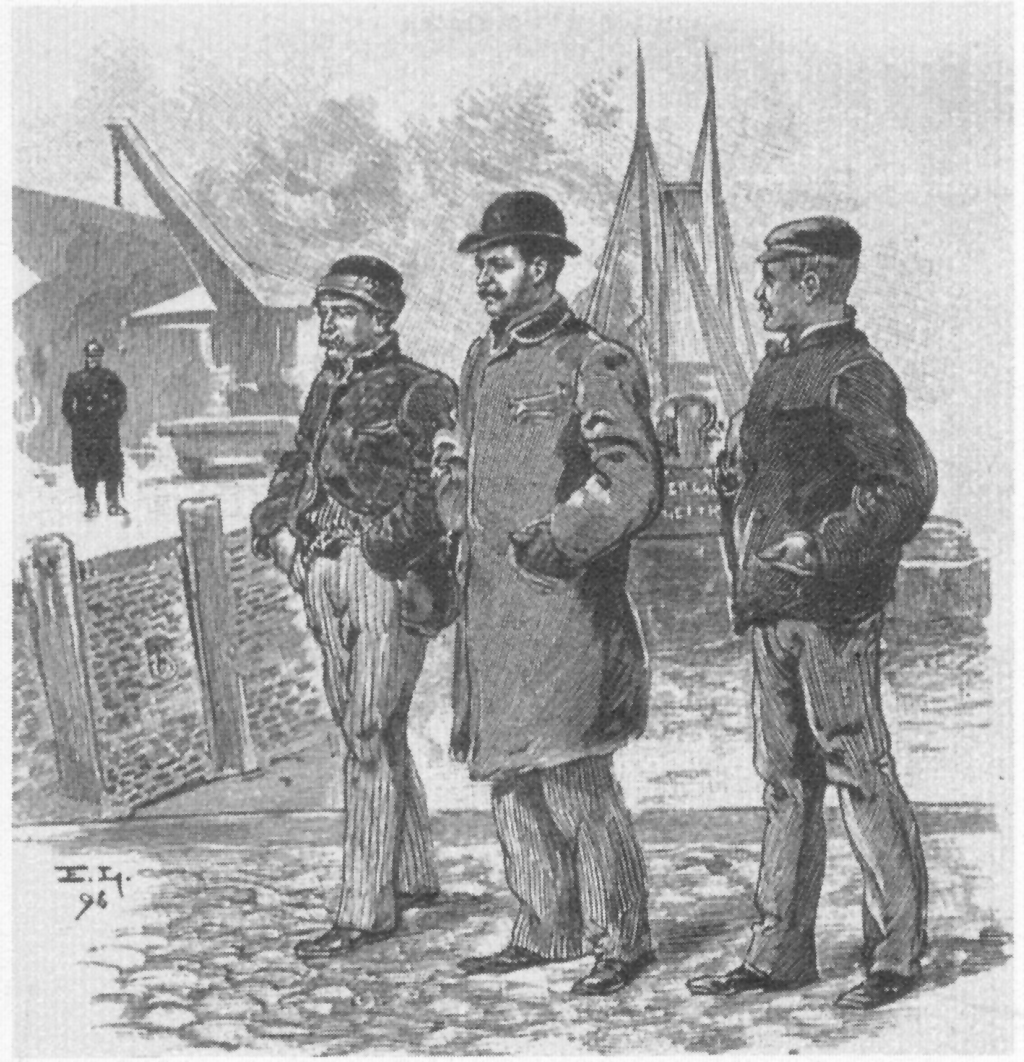
Strike pickets in the harbor. Wood engraving by Emil Limmer.

The strike continued over the Christmas holidays and into the new year, as did attempts to undermine the walkout by bringing in strikebreakers. These workers were able to get to their workplaces because the strikers were unable to persuade all the machinists to join the strike. This group of workers had largely distanced itself from the social democratic trade union movement for years. Many machinists, who worked in isolation from other groups of workers in the semi-darkness of the engine room every day, saw themselves more as captains and representatives of the employers. The remaining machinists kept transport in the port area going as best they could. The authorities' reprisals against the strikers intensified. The number of arrests, criminal charges, and penalty orders against strikers rose sharply. Strike funds were confiscated. In mid-January, the authorities imposed a state of minor siege on the entire port area, so that strikers were no longer allowed to enter.

Because the dockworkers were not prepared to give up in mid-January 1897, despite having been on strike for more than seven weeks, resistance to the hard line began to grow within the employers' camp. The shipowners and export merchants in particular were pushing for a change of course. They feared that a change in the weather expected in the coming days would lead to a significant increase in the demand for loading and unloading newly arriving ships. This would have shifted the balance back in favour of the strikers. An end to the strike was hardly foreseeable after the onset of the thaw, and the financial losses threatened to grow out of control. The Hamburg-Altona Employers' Association, therefore, proposed to the Senate—not to the strikers—that a permanent port inspector be appointed. In the future, this inspector would monitor conditions in the port and, where necessary, work with employers and workers to bring about improvements. Before this could happen, however, work had to resume. The Senate did not comment on this initiative, but the strike leaders did. Although they were unhappy that, once again, no guarantees had been given regarding reinstatement, the waiver of disciplinary measures, and the consideration of their complaints and grievances, they did not want to let the opportunity for agreement slip by. However, because direct negotiations between trade unions and employers remained taboo in the eyes of the latter, those willing to talk met on January 16, 1897, at the Hamburg Stock Exchange. The starting point for a compromise had improved, as the employers had indirectly agreed to negotiations with delegates of the strikers, and the demand for a port inspector was an old demand of the unions. However, the strikers' representatives insisted on binding commitments that their demands, which had been put forward for weeks, would be implemented after the end of the strike. They proposed a step-by-step, time-consuming process to resolve the points of conflict. Despite the opposing views on the conditions, procedures, and content of the negotiations, these direct contacts seemed to bring an amicable end to the conflict within reach.

=== End of the strike ===
However, an unexpected declaration of solidarity from a third party caused the fronts to harden once again and ultimately led to the failure of the agreement initiative, which had been launched on January 16, 1897, at the stock exchange. Liberal politicians and university professors appealed to the German population to support the Hamburg dockworkers, seeing in the employers' demands an unacceptable intention to force the other side into unconditional submission. Among the signatories of the “Professors' Appeal” were Friedrich Naumann, Otto Baumgarten, Heinrich Herkner, Ignaz Jastrow, Johannes Lehmann-Hohenberg, Moritz von Egidy, and Ferdinand Tönnies. Although the appeal raised around 40,000 marks in donations, the intervention embittered the entrepreneurs so much that the hardliners regained the upper hand within their association. On January 21, 1897, the entrepreneurs therefore rejected the conflict resolution procedure proposed by the strike representatives. Police Director Roscher considered the professors' intervention a “clumsy tactical mistake” because it came “at the most inopportune moment.” For their part, the strike leaders abandoned their demand for the reinstatement of all strikers in view of this hardening of the business camp. However, this concession had no effect, as the business leaders no longer responded to requests for talks.

The weather further weakened the strikers, as the expected thaw failed to materialise. The persistent frost now had the effect predicted by the strike leaders: the number of ships to be supplied remained low. The number of unemployed rose, which was detrimental to donations. On January 26, strike pay had to be reduced by 3 marks. The suspension of shipping on the upper Elbe meant that skilled workers could be mobilised for work in the port of Hamburg. The long duration of the strike noticeably improved the performance of the strike breakers, who had now settled into their jobs.

At the end of January 1897, the strike leadership therefore advised an unconditional end to the industrial action. 72 percent of those eligible to vote rejected this proposal in a ballot on January 30, 1897. It was not until a week later, when the strike had reached its peak after eleven weeks with 16,960 strike pay recipients, that a majority of 66 percent of those voting decided to end the strike unconditionally and immediately.

On the day the strike ended, violent clashes broke out, particularly in Hamburg's Neustadt district. Strike breakers fired shots from revolvers, provoking thousands of people to gather at Schaarmarkt. They engaged in street battles with the advancing police. The police broke up the crowd with armed force, and the number of people injured in these clashes was estimated at 150. Similar riots broke out in the following days. Under the impression of this open violence, a large number of strikebreakers fled the city. This increased the chances of the strikers being rehired.

== Results and consequences ==
=== Triumph of entrepreneurs and repression ===
Entrepreneurs publicly celebrated this result. Many credited themselves with having dealt a powerful blow to “international social democracy” and felt they had decided the “question of power” in their favour. With their demonstrated intransigence, they claimed to have served not only Hamburg's economy and shipping industry, but the entire German working life. They saw themselves as having defended the “bourgeois order on which the welfare and well-being of all our fellow citizens rest.”

The reactions of the employers were not limited to exaggerated statements in the press. The strikers experienced what many of them had feared. Only in rare cases were they rehired. Many employers demanded a written declaration that they would not take action against the strikebreakers. Some bosses demanded to see proof of union membership and tore it up. Many workers had to accept lower wages than before the strike. The state, as an employer, also showed no mercy. Initially, none of the state quay workers who had gone on strike were rehired. Later, those who were rehired had to accept lower-paid jobs as unskilled labourers. After the strike ended, the position of quay director was filled by a staunch opponent of social democracy.

=== Liberal and conservative conclusions ===
Liberal politicians saw the strike and its outcome as confirmation of the need to make arbitration tribunals and conciliation boards mandatory. They believed that this instrument would prevent labour disputes from escalating. Conservatives, on the other hand, saw the events as a sign of an impending overthrow. Against this backdrop, they believed that decisive measures against social democracy were necessary. General Waldersee considered violent confrontation between the state and the forces of revolution to be inevitable and advised the emperor in a memorandum not to wait until the state was seriously threatened. Instead, preventive measures should be taken against social democracy. At the very least, laws should be enacted that would make it more difficult to organise the masses and pose a serious threat to labour leaders. Wilhelm II agreed with these considerations and demanded the destruction of social democracy. In 1899, the State Secretary in the Reich Ministry of the Interior presented the Reichstag with the so-called prison bill, which was intended to restrict the effectiveness of the social democratic labour movement through massive threats of punishment. However, this legislative initiative failed due to the Reichstag majority.

=== Trade union organisation after the strike ===
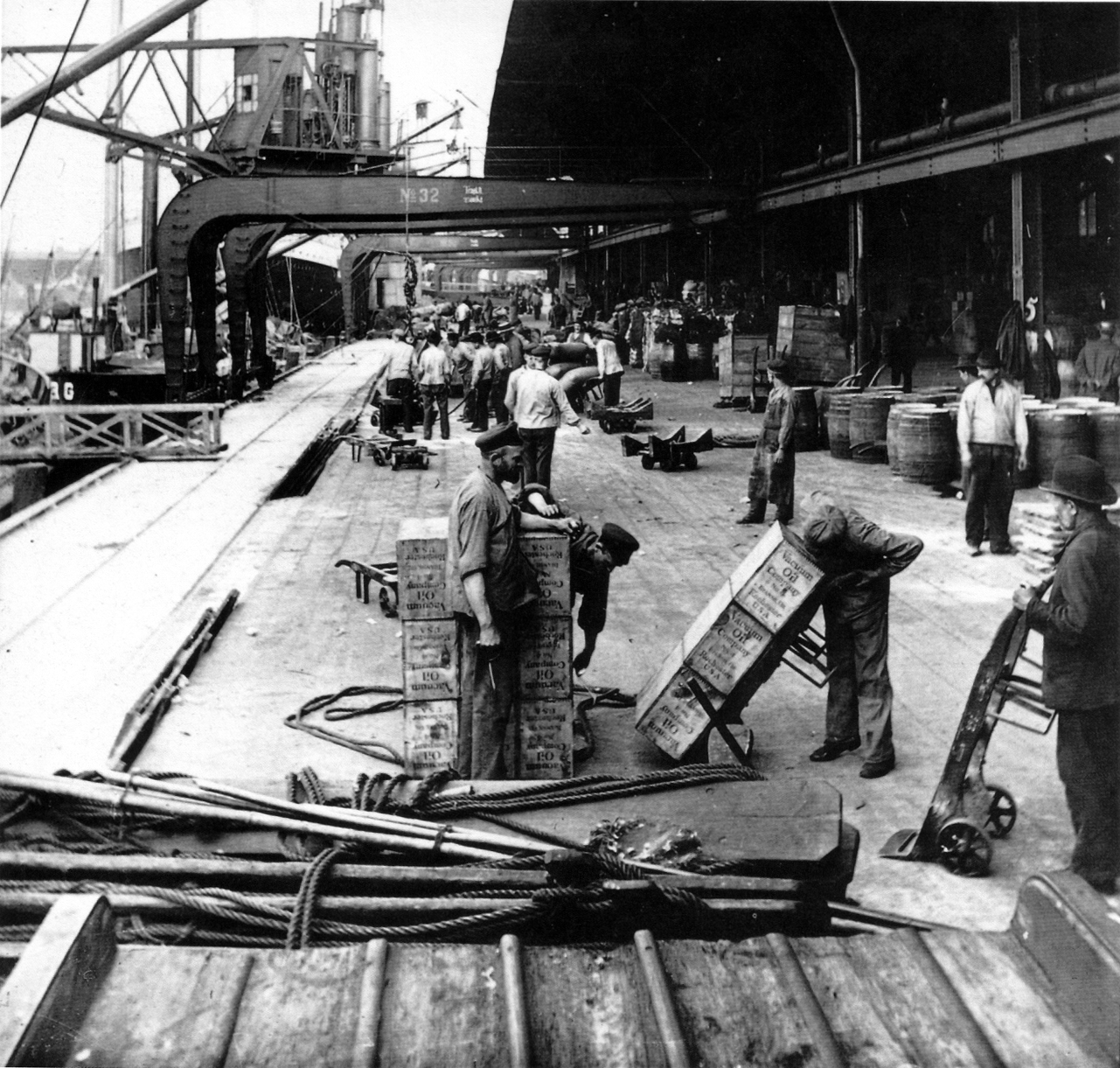
Dockworkers in the Port of Hamburg around 1900. Before the great strike, union membership was high, but it collapsed afterwards. Photo by Johann Hamann, c. 1900.

The strike leaders considered it a shortcoming that thousands of non-unionised workers were allowed to have a say in when the strike began and ended. If the right to participate in the decision had been linked to union membership, the strike might have had a more favourable outcome—or so it was assumed. However, the strike leaders' worst fear, which was also the employers' greatest hope, did not materialise: the dockworkers were not demoralised by their defeat; instead, they began to join the union en masse. At the end of 1897, there were over 6,700 members. The dockworkers also abandoned their localism and rejoined the dockworkers' union. However, the tendency to strike declined noticeably in the wake of the defeat of 1897. Furthermore, the repressive measures taken after the end of the strike shattered the union's influence among the state quay workers. Contrary to the trend, the level of organisation among this group of workers declined considerably.

=== Measures taken by the Hamburg Senate ===
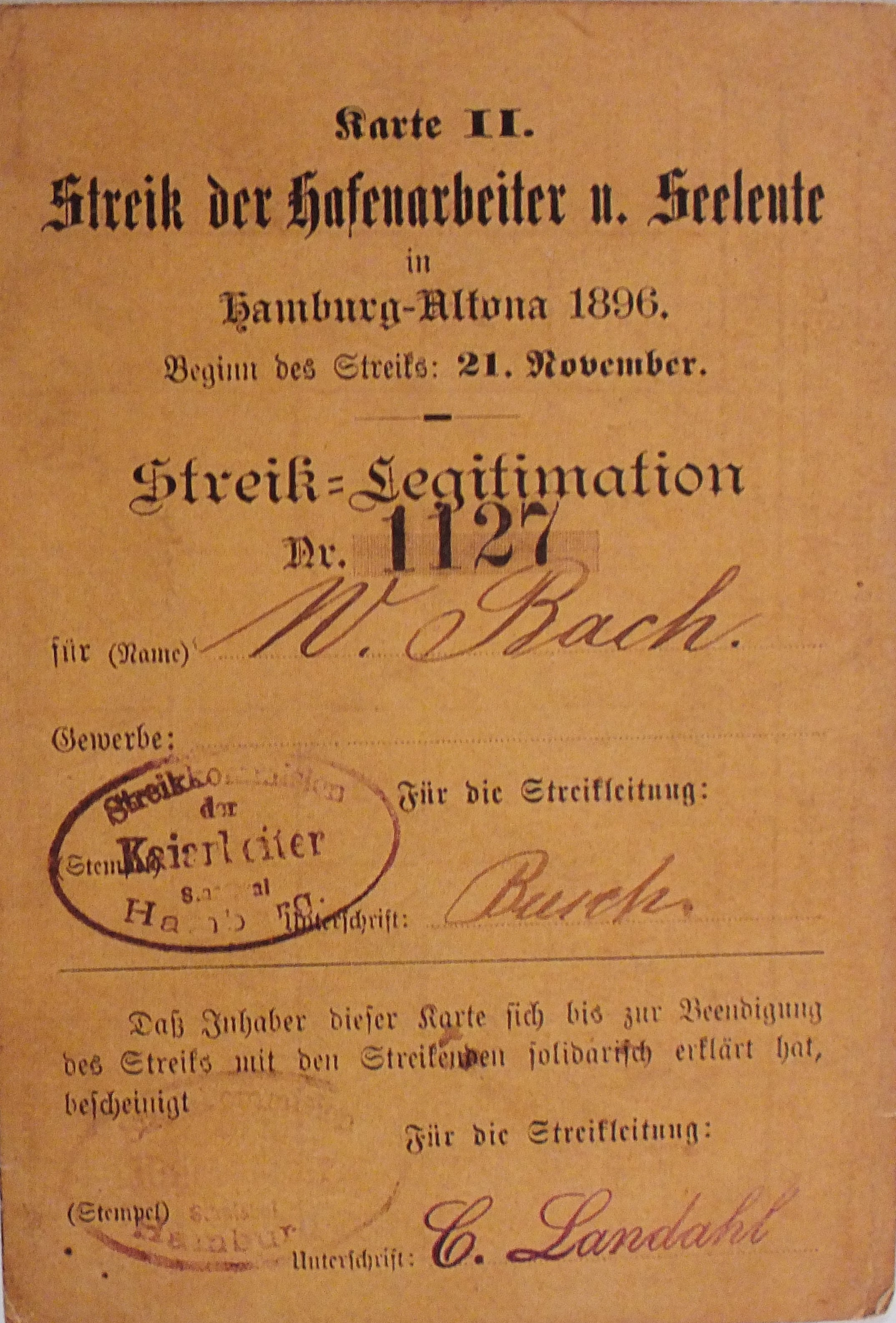
Strike card, 1896

The Hamburg Senate did not adopt the harsh repressive policies that Waldersee had recommended to the emperor. Instead, it reaffirmed the need for gradual social reform. The first measures were decided on February 10, 1897. The Senate appointed a commission to investigate conditions in the port. This working group looked closely at the workers' complaints and even let the unions share their thoughts, which basically meant the government was indirectly acknowledging them. The final report didn't pull any punches, clearly pointing out the problems with port work. Ferdinand Tönnies called the final report a way to justify the strike after the fact.

Employers implemented some—but not all—of the recommendations made in the investigation. From then on, wages were no longer paid in pubs but in wage offices. The Hamburg Shipowners' Association set up a central employment agency to reduce dependence on landlords and subcontractors in this area, too. Ferry fares in the port were reduced. The entrepreneurs also agreed to the proposal to create the office of the port inspector.

Another consequence of the strike was the decision to renovate the Gängeviertel district. This neighbourhood was not only considered a place of misery and vice, but also a hotbed of political dissent. However, the redevelopment dragged on for decades. Initial socio-political considerations to improve the quality of life for the local working class quickly fell by the wayside, as the economic interests of the landowners, who dominated Hamburg's parliament, prevailed almost unchallenged.

=== Permanent employment and collective agreements ===
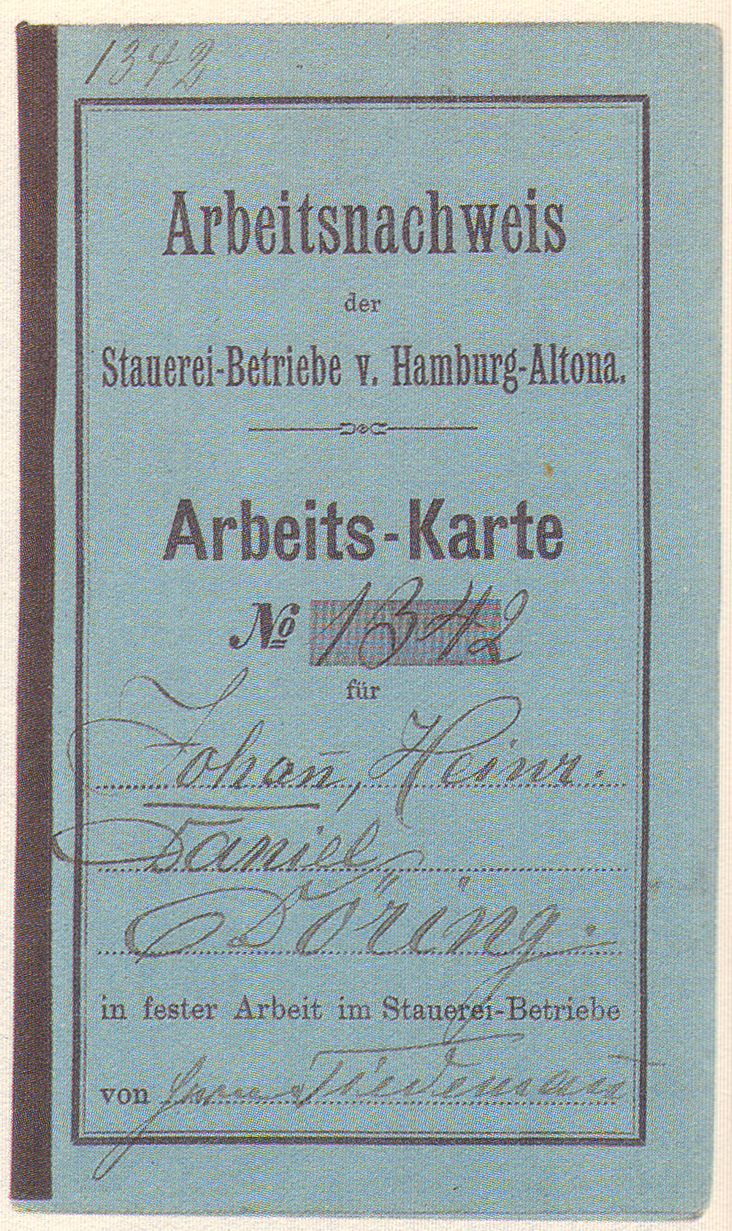
Work card from the private employment records of the stevedoring companies in Hamburg-Altona, issued to union leader Johann Döring

The dockworkers' strike was largely supported by workers in unstable employment. In the years following the major strike, employers concluded that offering permanent jobs would secure greater loyalty among workers and strengthen their identification with their work and the company. At the very least, however, they wanted to have workers who would be more reluctant to go on strike, because losing a permanent job carried a much higher risk than losing a job that was only temporary. The pioneers of this development were the coal importers and the HAPAG, followed in 1906 by the port companies, which joined together to form the Hafenbetriebsverein (Port Operating Association) and succeeded in bringing almost all job placement in the port under their control through their employment records. Before the First World War, these employment records became a bastion of entrepreneurial power in port operations and the largest job placement system in Germany.

For some time, employers refused to agree to collective bargaining agreements. But eventually, starting in 1898, a gradual change of heart took hold. The power of the unions could not be overlooked, let alone broken. Instead of a simmering skirmish, industrial peace based on collective agreements was the better, more stable, and ultimately more cost-effective solution. By 1913, the entire port area was covered by collective agreements.

== Reception after the end of the strike ==
=== Research ===
Historian Hans-Joachim Bieber has published two studies on the strike. The first describes the course of the strike and highlights the reactions of the Hamburg Senate. The second is a concise account of the causes, course, and consequences of the strike. Michael Grüttner has also published a brief study on the dockworkers' strike. The historian examines the social composition of the dockworkers, their economic situation, and their organisational and strike behaviour in order to relate the findings to the characteristics of the strike. In a further study, Grüttner's dissertation, the strike is embedded in a comprehensive examination of the working and living conditions “at the water's edge.” Grüttner shows that these conditions, on the one hand, created underemployment and poverty, but on the other hand, also opened up spaces of freedom that were stubbornly defended against the disciplining demands of industrial work for years.

=== Fictionalizations ===
Georg Asmussen, a long-time engineer at Blohm + Voss, incorporated the strike into his 1905 novel Stürme (Storms), which focuses in particular on the conflict between strikers and strike breakers. The protagonist, Hans Thordsen, himself on the side of the strikers, criticises above all that the principle of solidarity is being exploited and abused by drones who are unwilling to work. The director Werner Hochbaum chose a different way of conveying and interpreting this labour dispute. In 1929, he shot the silent film Brüder (Brothers) in Hamburg, which sought to commemorate the events of 1896/97.

== Bibliography ==
- Legien, Carl (1897). Der Streik der Hafenarbeiter und Seeleute in Hamburg-Altona. Darstellung der Ursachen und des Verlaufs des Streiks, sowie der Arbeits- und Lohnverhältnisse der im Hafenverkehr beschäftigten Arbeiter [The strike by dockworkers and seafarers in Hamburg-Altona. Description of the causes and course of the strike, as well as the working and wage conditions of workers employed in port transport.] (in German). Hamburg: Verlag der Generalkommission der Gewerkschaften Deutschlands.
- Geffken, Rolf (1988). Jammer & Wind: Eine alternative Geschichte der deutschen Seeschiffahrt vom Mittelalter bis zur Gegenwart [Jammer & Wind: An Alternative History of German Seafaring from the Middle Ages to the Present Day] (3 ed.). VAR. ISBN 978-3924621018.
- Düding, Dieter (1972). Der Nationalsoziale Verein, 1896-1903. Der gescheiterte Versuch e. parteipolit. Synthese v. Nationalismus, Sozialismus und Liberalismus [The National Socialist Association, 1896-1903. The failed attempt at a party-political synthesis of nationalism, socialism, and liberalism]. München, Wien, Oldenbourg. ISBN 978-3-486-43801-7.
- Rilke, Hannelore (1979). Arbeitskampf und öffentliche Meinung. Der Hamburger Hafenarbeiterstreik 1896/97 aus bürgerlich-liberaler Sicht [Labor disputes and public opinion. The Hamburg dockworkers' strike of 1896/97 from a bourgeois-liberal perspective]. Master of Arts at the University of Hamburg.
- Achten, Udo; Kamin-Seggewies, Bernt (2007). Curt Legien: Kraftproben. Die Kämpfe der Beschäftigten gegen die Liberalisierung der Hafenarbeit. "Der Streik der Hafenarbeiter und Seeleute in Hamburg-Altona" von 1896/97 [Curt Legien: Trials of Strength. The Struggles of Workers Against the Liberalisation of Port Work. ‘The Strike of Port Workers and Seamen in Hamburg-Altona’ of 1896/97] (in German). Hamburg: VSA. ISBN 978-3-89965-263-5.
- Tönnies, Ferdinand (2011). Fechner, Rolf (ed.). Schriften zum Hamburger Hafenarbeiterstreik [Writings on the Hamburg dockworkers' strike] (in German). München: Profil. ISBN 978-3-89019-660-2.
