= Red Orchids =

1938 film directed by Nunzio Malasomma

- Directed by: Nunzio Malasomma
- Written by: Kurt Heuser; Philipp Lothar Mayring; Harald G. Petersson
- Starring: Olga Chekhova; Albrecht Schoenhals; Camilla Horn; Herbert Hübner
- Cinematography: Franz Koch
- Edited by: Alexandra Anatra
- Music by: Franz Grothe
- Production company: Fabrikation Deutscher Filme
- Distributed by: UFA (United States)
- Release date: 8 September 1938
- Running time: 86 minutes
- Country: Nazi Germany
- Language: German

Red Orchids (German: Rote Orchideen) is a 1938 German crime film directed by Nunzio Malasomma, starring Olga Chekhova, Albrecht Schoenhals and Camilla Horn.

== Cast ==
- Olga Chekhova as Maria Dorando
- Albrecht Schoenhals as Alexander Nica, Ingenieur
- Camilla Horn as Baronin Ogolenska
- Herbert Hübner as Professor Castro
- Paul Westermeier as Reno, Diener bei Castro
- Anton Pointner as Bob
- Walter Janssen as Moras, Inspektor der FNG.-Werke
- Ursula Herking as Jessie, Maria Dorandos Freundin
- Alfred Döderlein as Laurenz / Ingenieur / Nicas Mitarbeiter
- Hans Nielsen as Antonio, Marias Bruder
- Walter Steinbeck as Der Intendant
- Hermann Pfeiffer as Alfonso
- Ekkehard Arendt as 1. Schutzmann
- Günther Brackmann as Ein Boy
- Gaston Briese as Herr im Auto
- Angelo Ferrari as Gilbert
- Hans Halden as Bruns, Nachtwächter der FNG.-Werke
- Gustav Mahncke as Portier der Oper
- Hermann Meyer-Falkow as Zollbeamter
- Kurt Mikulski as Bahnsteigschaffner
- Seraj Munir as 1. Diener bei Castro
- Gustav Püttjer as 2. Nachtwächter der FNG.-Werke
- Joachim Rake as 2. Schutzmann
- Else Reval as Dame im Auto
- Willi Schaeffers as Schlafwagenschaffner
- Hans Schneider as 2.Diener bei Castro
- Arnulf Schroder as Untersuchungsrichter
- Hanns Waschatko as 3. Diener bei Castro
- Jens von Hagen as Phillips
- Michael von Newlinsky as Bela
- Herta Worell
- Bruno Ziener
- Borwin Walth
- F.W. Schröder-Schrom
- Werner Pledath
- Edith Meinhard
- Charly Huber
- William Huch
- Charles Willy Kayser
- Kurt Keller-Nebri

== Bibliography ==
- Bock, Hans-Michael; Bergfelder, Tim, eds. (2009). The Concise Cinegraph: Encyclopaedia of German Cinema. New York: Berghahn Books. ISBN 978-1-57181-655-9.
