= Talking About Jacqueline =

1937 film

- Directed by: Werner Hochbaum
- Written by: Katrin Holland (novel); Friedrich Dammann; Werner Hochbaum
- Starring: Wera Engels; Albrecht Schoenhals; Sabine Peters
- Cinematography: Georg Bruckbauer
- Edited by: Walter Wischniewsky
- Music by: Anton Profes
- Production company: Deka Film
- Release date: 16 April 1937
- Running time: 83 minutes
- Country: Germany
- Language: German

Talking About Jacqueline (German: Man spricht über Jacqueline) is a 1937 German drama film directed by Werner Hochbaum and starring Wera Engels, Albrecht Schoenhals and Sabine Peters. It was shot at the Johannisthal Studios in Berlin The film's sets were designed by Alfred Bütow, Willi Herrmann and Hermann Warm. It was based on a 1926 novel by Katrin Holland which was later made into a 1942 British film Talk About Jacqueline.

== Synopsis ==
Two sisters compete for the affections of the same man.

== Cast ==
- Wera Engels as Jacqueline Topelius
- Albrecht Schoenhals as Michael Thomas
- Sabine Peters as June Topelius
- Hans Zesch-Ballot as Leslie Waddington
- Fritz Genschow as Lionel Clark
- Friedl Haerun as Gloria Watson
- Edith Meinhard as Ellen
- Bruno Ziener as William
- Franz Arzdorf as Wahrsager
- Eduard Bornträger as Konservatoriumsdiener
- Fred Goebel as Sekretär
- Charlie Kracker
- Hermann Pfeiffer as Jean
- Ewald Wenck as Würstchenverkäufer
- Buschhagen as Rennfahrer
- Ehmer as Rennfahrer
- Lili Schoenborn-Anspach as Portiersfrau
- Paul Mederow as Musikprofessor
- Rosi Rauch as Singer

== Bibliography ==
- Bock, Hans-Michael & Bergfelder, Tim. The Concise Cinegraph: Encyclopaedia of German Cinema. Berghahn Books, 2009.
- Heins, Laura. Nazi Film Melodrama. University of Illinois Press, 2013.
