= Light Cavalry (1935 French film) =

1935 film

- Directed by: Werner Hochbaum; Roger Vitrac
- Written by: Heinz Lorenz-Lambrecht (novel); Franz Rauch; Roger Vitrac
- Produced by: Alfred Zeisler
- Starring: Mona Goya; Gabriel Gabrio; Constant Rémy
- Cinematography: Bruno Timm
- Edited by: Arnfried Heyne
- Music by: Hans-Otto Borgmann
- Production company: Fabrikation Deutscher Filme
- Distributed by: L'Alliance Cinématographique Européenne
- Release date: 1935
- Running time: 96 minutes
- Countries: France; Germany
- Language: French

Light Cavalry (French: Cavalerie légère) is a 1935 French-German musical film directed by Werner Hochbaum and starring Mona Goya, Gabriel Gabrio and Constant Rémy. It is the French-language version of Light Cavalry, part of a trend during the 1930s to make Multiple-language versions of productions. Like the German original, it uses music from the operetta Light Cavalry.

== Cast ==
- Mona Goya as Rosika
- Gabriel Gabrio as Chérubini
- Constant Rémy as Flip
- Jean-Louis Allibert as Géza von Rakos
- Ernest Ferny as Palato
- Line Noro as Mme. Palato
- Marcel Vallée as Franconi
- Raoul Marco as Pietro
- Myno Burney as Catella
- Fernand Fabre as Coloman

== Bibliography ==
- Goble, Alan. The Complete Index to Literary Sources in Film. Walter de Gruyter, 1999.
