= Albrecht Schoenhals =

German film actor

- Born: 7 March 1888; Mannheim, German Empire
- Died: 4 December 1978 (aged 90); Baden-Baden, West Germany
- Occupation: Film actor
- Years active: 1934–1969

Albrecht Moritz James Karl Schoenhals (7 March 1888 – 4 December 1978) was a German film actor.

== Life ==
Born Moritz James Karl, Albrecht Schoenhals was the son of the German General upper physician Gustav Schoenhals (1855-1930) and an English mother. He grew up in Freiburg/Breisgau and then studied medicine in Berlin. Subsequently, he worked for a Berlin charity as a doctor and then volunteered as an army doctor for the field artillery regiment to Metz on the western front during World War I. In the last year of the war, he suffered a serious wound to his arm and was invalided out of service in 1918. While recovering, he wrote his doctoral thesis and joined a volunteer corps of the Army School Döberitz.

Schoenhals had originally hoped to become a surgeon, but he was unable to pursue this path due to his arm injury. Instead, he took acting classes under Eduard von Winterstein in Freiburg. He received his first stage engagement in 1920 at the City Theater Freiburg (Stadttheater Freiburg), where he played Orest in Goethe's Iphigenie auf Tauris. He worked in Halberstadt, in Freiburg (1921-1924), in Baden-Baden, Frankfurt, Dortmund, and at the Hamburger Kammerspiele (1928-1934), where he was an ensemble member.

He married the actress Anneliese Born in 1930 and their son Kai was born in 1933.

In 1934, while working in Hamburg, a casting director from the UFA discovered Schoenhals and selected him as a double for Arthur Robison's romance Prince Woronzeff. Schoenhals subsequently had a successful film career, starring in German romantic melodramas of the 1930s and 1940s, where he was adept at playing the role of aristocrats, senior officers, and professional men of considerable stature, such as surgeons, concert violinists, and so forth. He was known for his considerable charm and elegant appearance. However, under the seemingly impeccable veneer his charisma-like charm, Schoenhals exhibited the capacity to play the villain, such as in the Willi Forst crime film Mazurka. In this film, he portrays a rapist who is shot many years later by his victim, played by Pola Negri. In the romance Intermezzo, Schoenhals starred as a mysterious player who exploited the plight of an opera diva, forcing her to purchase the rights to her own voice. In Veit Harlan's Tolstoy film Die Kreutzersonate, he seduced a married woman. In a number of other films, he portrayed very reliable and upstanding characters, including the film Roman eines Arztes, where he portrays a man who goes to jail in his wife's stead, after she is convicted of murder.

Albrecht Schoenhals starred alongside the Divas of UFA, Pola Negri, Camilla Horn and Sybille Schmitz, as well as the "Darlings" of the Nazi leadership, Lil Dagover, Olga Chekhova and Lída Baarová. His career ended abruptly in 1940 when he fell out of favor with the Nazi regime for refusing to play the title role in Jud Süß, an antisemitic propaganda film. From then on, he was cast in only a few films, and was forced in 1941 to participate in a Nazi propaganda film for children entitled Kopf hoch, Johannes! (Cheer Up, Johannes!). In this film, a teenage boy is spoiled hopelessly by his mother while his father is not around. Schoenhals plays a landowner who is bothered by the boy, and he is taught a sense of camaraderie. Following the film, Schoenhals withdrew from the theater to his estate in Baden-Baden, "Annenhof."

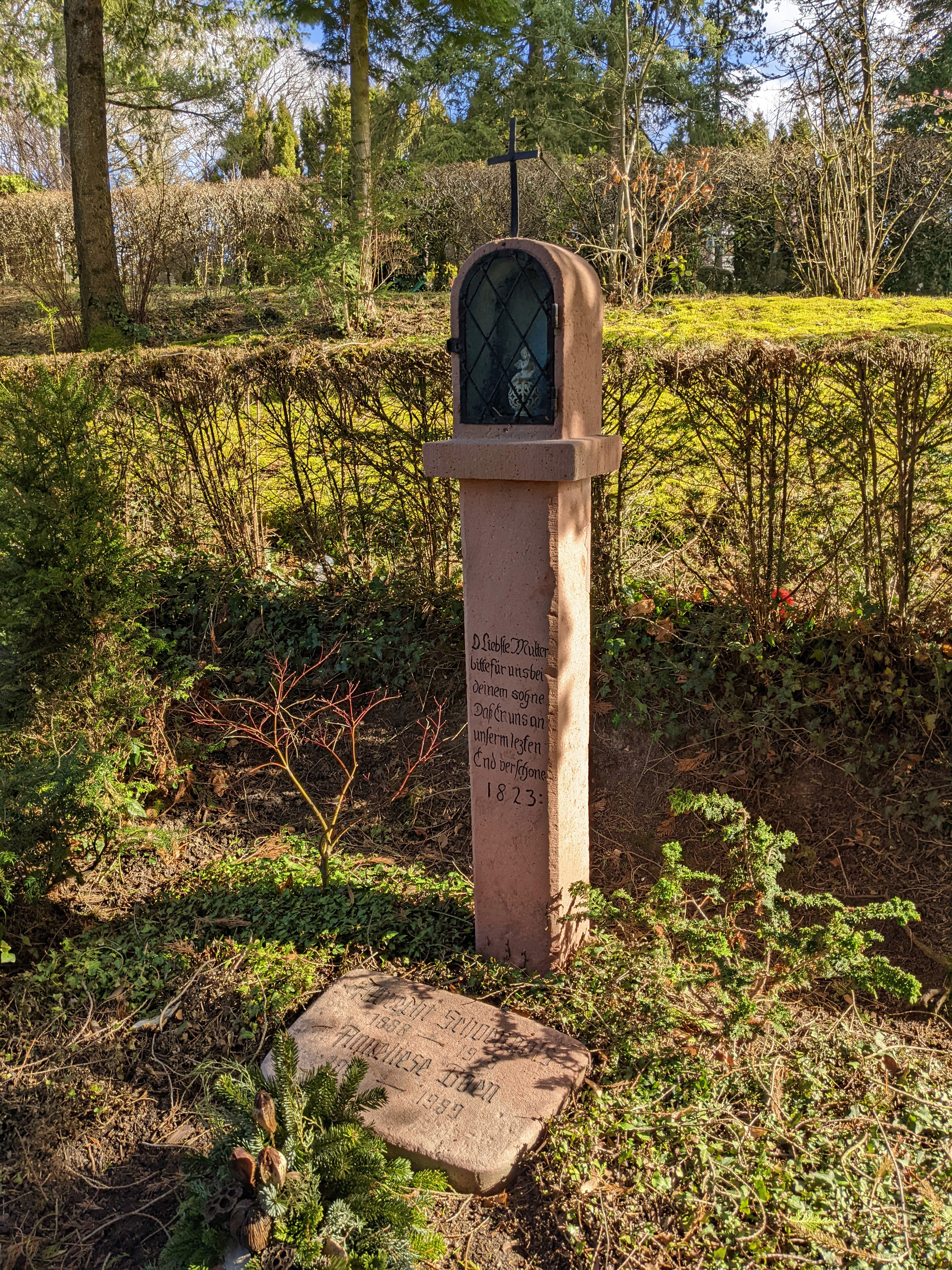
Grave monument in the main cemetery of Baden-Baden

After the end of World War II, he worked as a doctor at the city hospital of Baden-Baden. In the late 1940s, he and his wife returned to the theater. He continued to star alongside leading actresses and play men of high rank. He began to be cast more as a supporting actor and eventually faded into the background. From 1956 to 1968, Schoenhals was involved in many television productions. From the early 1960s onward, he also devoted himself increasingly to his personal interests, such as French literature, a field in which he was an active translator and editor. He was occasionally a stage director and focused on translation of original French plays into German. In 1965, Schoenhals received the German Film Award for "long-standing and outstanding achievements in German film." In 1967, he received the Federal Cross of Merit. He returned to film in 1969 for a supporting role in Luchino Visconti's film The Damned. He died at age 90 and was buried at a cemetery in Baden-Baden.

== Partial filmography ==
- Count Woronzeff (1934) - Fürst Woronzeff & Baron Franz von Naydek
- Ihr größter Erfolg (1934) - Graf Wladimir Jaroff
- Mazurka (1935) - Grigorij Michailow
- Warum lügt Fräulein Käthe? (1935) - Dr. Herbert Bornemann - Fabrikant
- Stradivari (1935) - Dr. Pietro Rossi
- April, April! (1935) - Prinz von Holsten-Böhlau
- One Too Many on Board (1935) - Kapitän von Moltmann
- Pillars of Society (1935) - Johann Tonnessen
- A Doctor of Conviction (1936) - Dr. Felgentreu
- Boccaccio (1936) - Cesare d'Este - Herzog von Ferrara
- Intermezzo (1936) - Trent
- Hannerl and Her Lovers (1936) - Van den Born
- The Kreutzer Sonata (1937) - Gregor Tuchatschewsky
- The Glass Ball (1937) - Axel von Schack
- Talking About Jacqueline (1937) - Michael Thomas
- Tango Notturno (1937) - Jac Gerard, Composer
- Das große Abenteuer (1938) - Bernd Geldern
- Mystery About Beate (1938) - Dr. Normann
- Maja zwischen zwei Ehen (1938) - Hans Wieland
- Der Spieler (1938) - Dr. Tronka
- Red Orchids (1938) - Alexander Nica - Ingenieur
- The Stars Shine (1938) - Himself
- Ich verweigere die Aussage (1939) - Heinz Ottendorf, Architekt
- Woman Without a Past (1939) - Dr. Entrupp
- Roman eines Arztes (1939) - Dr. Thomas Üding
- Nanette (1940) - Georg Miller
- Angelika (1940) - Dr. Westphal
- Herz ohne Heimat (1940) - Dr. Clemens Diersberg
- Ritorno (1940) - Il maestro Hutten
- Traummusik (1940) - Michele Donato, alias Mac Dynar
- Kopf hoch, Johannes! (1941) - Vater von Redel
- Giungla (1942) - Il dottor Dos Passos / Pietro Fischer
- Vom Schicksal verweht (1942) - Dr. Dos Passos
- Verführte Hände (1949) - Dr. Aslan Trollop
- Don't Play with Love (1949) - Eduard Caroly
- Blondes for Export (1950) - Gorla
- Three Girls Spinning (1950) - Eduard Amberg
- Eva und der Frauenarzt (1951) - Dr.Florian
- The Guilt of Doctor Homma (1951) - Justizrat Kersten
- Illusion in a Minor Key (1952) - Werner Alsbacher
- It Was Always So Nice With You (1954) - Miskverleger Conrads
- Portrait of an Unknown Woman (1954) - Botschafter
- The Forest House in Tyrol (1955) - Richard Ferner
- Little Lord Fauntleroy (1962, TV film) - Earl of Dorincourt
- Scotland Yard Hunts Dr. Mabuse (1963) - Sir Robert General Allingham
- The Damned (1969) - Baron Joachim Von Essenbeck (final film role)
