= The Empress's Favourite =

1936 film

- Directed by: Werner Hochbaum
- Written by: Charles Amberg; Hans Martin Cremer (book); Werner Hochbaum; Hans Fritz Köllner (book); Walter von Hollander
- Produced by: Alberto Giacalone
- Starring: Olga Chekhova; Anton Pointner; Heinz von Cleve
- Cinematography: Oskar Schnirch
- Edited by: Walter Wischniewsky
- Music by: Anton Profes
- Production company: Itala Film
- Release date: 12 March 1936
- Country: Germany
- Language: German

The Empress's Favourite (German: Der Favorit der Kaiserin) is a 1936 German historical comedy film directed by Werner Hochbaum and starring Olga Chekhova, Anton Pointner and Heinz von Cleve. It was shot at the Johannisthal Studios in Berlin. The film's sets were designed by Emil Hasler and Arthur Schwarz. The film is set in Russia during the reign of Empress Elizabeth.

== Main cast ==
- Olga Chekhova as Elisabeth Kaiserin von Russland
- Anton Pointner as Fürst Ivan Potozky
- Heinz von Cleve as Prinz von Gottorp Vetter der Zarin
- Carl Esmond as Fähnrich Alexander Tomsky
- Walter Steinbeck as Graf Kurganoff
- Trude Marlen as Irina, seine Tochter, Hofdame
- Ilse Trautschold as Sophie ihr Kammermädchen
- Peter Erkelenz as Oberst Runitsch
- Erik Ode as Fähnrich Alexander Platow
- Adele Sandrock as Fürstin Dolgorucky
- Hans Adalbert Schlettow as Baron Axhausen
- Ada Tschechowa as Hofdame Romoff
- Edith Meinhard as Hofdame Wolkow
- Willy Kaiser-Heyl as Zeremonienmeister
- Wolf Harro as Fähnrich Alexander Schuwaloff
- Kurt Hinz as Fähnrich Alexander Repnin
- Carl Walther Meyer as Fähnrich Alexander Bonin

== Bibliography ==
- Beevor, Antony (2014). The Mystery of Olga Chekhova. New York: Penguin Books. ISBN 978-1-101-17505-7.
- Klaus, Ulrich J. Deutsche Tonfilme: Jahrgang 1936. Klaus-Archiv, 1988.
