= The Castle in Flanders =

1936 film directed by Géza von Bolváry

- Directed by: Géza von Bolváry
- Written by: Curt J. Braun
- Starring: Mártha Eggerth; Paul Hartmann; Georg Alexander
- Cinematography: Werner Brandes
- Edited by: Hermann Haller
- Music by: Franz Grothe
- Production company: Tobis Film
- Distributed by: Tobis Film
- Release date: 14 August 1936
- Running time: 93 minutes
- Country: Germany
- Language: German

The Castle in Flanders (German: Das Schloß in Flandern) is a 1936 German drama film directed by Géza von Bolváry and starring Mártha Eggerth, Paul Hartmann, and Georg Alexander. It was shot at the Johannisthal Studios in Berlin. The film's sets were designed by the art directors Emil Hasler and Arthur Schwarz.

== Cast ==
- Mártha Eggerth as Gloria Delamare
- Paul Hartmann as Fred Winsbury
- Georg Alexander as Bob Harrogate
- Hilde Weissner as Lady Margaret
- Valy Arnheim as Gaspard, Kastellan
- Eduard Bornträger
- Gerhard Dammann as Polizist
- Peter Elsholtz as Lincoln
- Edwin Jürgensen as Sir Ramsey
- Rudolf Klicks as Piccolo
- Gerti Kraus
- Else Lüders
- Rio Nobile as Clifton
- Irmgard Novac
- Gerti Ober
- Paul Otto as Sir Archibald Winsbury
- Sabine Peters as Anne, Zofe bei Gloria
- Willi Schaeffers as Gast
- Georg H. Schnell as Regiments-Adjutant
- Kurt Seifert as Hotelportier
- Valeska Stock
- Alfred Stratmann
- Toni Tetzlaff
- Rolf von Goth as Brigg
- Jens von Hagen as Major Murray
- Hertha von Walther as Baronin
- Rudolf Vones
- Otto Wernicke as Bonnet, Agent

== Reception ==
Writing for Night and Day in 1937, Graham Greene gave the film a mixed review. Greene noted that the film's depictions of England and English culture were rather off the mark, but despite this he claimed that "th[e] picture has merits" and that "there are excellent scenes" which he identified as the scenes in Ypres after the war had ended and Gloria Delamare (Eggerth) attempts to book a hotel room only to be moved by a porter to the neighboring castle. Greene points to the return of Fred Winsbury (Hartmann) as the point in the film where the audience loses interest and the film loses reality.

== Bibliography ==
- Bock, Hans-Michael; Bergfelder, Tim, eds. (2009). The Concise Cinegraph: Encyclopaedia of German Cinema. New York: Berghahn Books. ISBN 978-1-57181-655-9.
