= Eduard Bornträger =

German film actor

- Born: 22 June 1888; Wiesbaden, Hesse, German Empire
- Died: 9 March 1958 (aged 69); West Berlin, West Germany
- Other name: Eduard Janaz Franz Bornträger
- Occupation: Actor
- Years active: 1931–1954 (film)

Eduard Bornträger (22 June 1888 – 9 March 1958) was a German film actor.

== Selected filmography ==
- The Hunter from Kurpfalz (1933)
- Police Report (1934)
- Lady Windermere's Fan (1935)
- The Private Life of Louis XIV (1935)
- A Woman of No Importance (1936)
- The Castle in Flanders (1936)
- Winter in the Woods (1936)
- The Impossible Woman (1936)
- Woman's Love—Woman's Suffering (1937)
- Togger (1937)
- Talking About Jacqueline (1937)
- An Enemy of the People (1937)
- The Chief Witness (1937)
- By a Silken Thread (1938)
- Northern Lights (1938)
- Two Women (1938)
- The Girl of Last Night (1938)
- The Night of Decision (1938)
- Kitty and the World Conference (1939)
- We Danced Around the World (1939)
- The Life and Loves of Tschaikovsky (1939)
- Falstaff in Vienna (1940)
- Counterfeiters (1940)
- Alarm (1941)
- The Waitress Anna (1941)
- Diesel (1942)
- Heaven, We Inherit a Castle (1943)
- Thank You, I'm Fine (1948)

== Bibliography ==
- Wolfgang Jacobsen & Hans Helmut Prinzler. Käutner. Spiess, 1992.
