= Police Report (1934 film) =

1934 film

- Directed by: Georg Jacoby
- Written by: Walter Wassermann
- Based on: Die Frau im schwarzen Schleier by Hedda Lindner
- Starring: Olga Chekhova; Paul Otto; Hansi Niese
- Cinematography: Friedl Behn-Grund
- Music by: Friedrich Wilhelm Rust
- Production company: Majestic Film
- Release date: 12 January 1934
- Country: Germany
- Language: German

Police Report (German: Der Polizeibericht meldet) is a 1934 German mystery crime film directed by Georg Jacoby and starring Olga Chekhova, Paul Otto and Hansi Niese. It was adapted from the 1932 novel Die Frau im schwarzen Schleier by Hedda Lindne.

== Synopsis ==
The head of the company is found shot dead, not long after attempting to seduce Gisela Ostercamp, the wife of his business partner. The police investigate and conclude that she is guilty of the murder. She is placed on trial but the murdered man's brother, a lawyer, takes up her case.

== Cast ==
- Olga Chekhova as Gisela Ostercamp
- Paul Otto as Dr. Wolf Ostercamp, ihr Mann
- Hansi Niese as Tante Nell, Giselas Tante
- Johannes Riemann as Wilbert Burkhardt, Rechtsanwalt
- Walter Steinbeck Direktor Burkhardt, sein Bruder
- Käthe Haack as Anna Scheele
- Gerhard Bienert as Ihr Mann, ein Arbeiter
- Carl Balhaus as Schriftleiter
- Hugo Fischer-Köppe as Steppuhn, Chauffeur bei RA. Burkhardt
- Walter Gross as Schmidt
- Friedrich Kayßler Vorsitzender des Gerichtes
- Carsta Löck as Mädchen bei Burkhardt
- Georg H. Schnell as Staatsanwalt
- Hans Zesch-Ballot as Kriminalkommissär Haupt
- Willi Schur as Wirt
- Betty Sedlmayr as Sängerpaar
- Leni Sponholz as Frau Schmidt, seine Frau
- Ursula van Diemen Kyra Lindemann, Opernsängerin
- Walter von Lennep as Sängerpaar
- Ernst Behmer
- Eduard Bornträger
- Arthur Grosse
- Charlie Kracker
- Fritz Linn
- Gerti Ober
- Gustav Püttjer
- Heinz Wemper
- Ewald Wenck

== Bibliography ==
- Giesen, Rolf. The Nosferatu Story: The Seminal Horror Film, Its Predecessors and Its Enduring Legacy. McFarland, 2019.
- Rentschler, Eric. The Ministry of Illusion: Nazi Cinema and Its Afterlife. Harvard University Press, 1996.
