= Heinz von Cleve =

- Born: 27 June 1897; Schwedt an der Oder, Brandenburg, German Empire
- Died: 9 October 1984 (aged 87); Düsseldorf, North Rhine-Westphalia, West Germany
- Other name: Heinz Max von Cleve
- Occupation: Actor
- Years active: 1933-1972 (film)

Heinz von Cleve (27 June 1897 – 9 October 1984) was a German stage and film actor.

== Life ==
Cleve was the son of Gottlieb von Cleve, a young officer in the 2nd Dragoon Regiment, by his marriage to Elisabeth zu Dobeneck. He attended schools in his home town of Schwedt, Elbing, and Stettin, then in 1914 joined the 4th Guards Field Artillery Regiment in Potsdam and in 1915 was promoted to lieutenant. In July 1915 he was wounded at Krasnostaw, during the Mackensen Offensive, and later served on the Western Front, receiving the Iron Cross, First and Second Class.

After the war, Cleve tried a banking career, then studied law and economics at Munich. In 1925 he gained a job with an Association of Industrialists in Dresden.

In 1928 he became a stage actor, appearing in productions in Meissen, Hamburg, Nuremberg, Görlitz, and Berlin. At the beginning of the 1930s he came to Berlin for his first film part, in the feature film Waltz War. From then until 1939 he acted in many films, gaining some leading roles and the nickname "the handsome man of Ufa".

After the Second World War, Cleve was less active in the film world, but he had parts in television productions and also acted in Shakespeare plays.

== Selected filmography ==
- Waltz War (1933)
- The Island (1934)
- Light Cavalry (1935)
- The Private Life of Louis XIV (1935)
- Victoria (1935)
- Hundred Days (1935)
- The Empress's Favourite (1936)
- Ball at the Metropol (1937)
- An Enemy of the People (1937)
- Ride to Freedom (1937)
- The Beaver Coat (1937)
- Maria Ilona (1939)
- Ursula Under Suspicion (1939)
- Das Halstuch (1962, TV miniseries)

== Bibliography ==
- Goble, Alan. The Complete Index to Literary Sources in Film. Walter de Gruyter, 1999.
