= Sabine Peters =

German actress

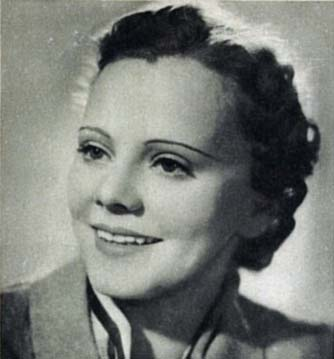
- Sabine Peters,1935
- Born: 29 December 1912; Berlin, Brandenburg; German Empire
- Died: 10 October 1982 (aged 69); Munich, Bavaria; West Germany
- Occupation: Actress
- Years active: 1932 - 1949 (film)

Sabine Peters (29 December 1912 – 10 October 1982) was a German film actress. Peters emerged as a film actress during the Nazi era, and played largely supporting roles. She was one of the companions of the title in the 1938 Ingrid Bergman vehicle The Four Companions.

She was married to the baritone Willi Domgraf-Fassbaender. The mezzo-soprano Brigitte Fassbaender is their daughter.

== Selected filmography ==
- Eight Girls in a Boat (1932)
- Ripening Youth (1933)
- Financial Opportunists (1934)
- The Girl Irene (1936)
- The Castle in Flanders (1936)
- The Beaver Coat (1937)
- Talking About Jacqueline (1937)
- The Chief Witness (1937)
- The Glass Ball (1937)
- The Night of Decision (1938)
- The Four Companions (1938)
- A Prussian Love Story (1938)
- Mystery About Beate (1938)
- Friedemann Bach (1941)
- A Flea in Her Ear (1943)
- A Beautiful Day (1944)
- The Marriage of Figaro (1949)

== Bibliography ==
- Chandler, Charlotte. Ingrid: Ingrid Bergman, A Personal Biography. Simon and Schuster, 2007.
