= Hans Zesch-Ballot =

German actor

- Born: Hans Georg Ziesche; 20 May 1896; Dresden, German Empire
- Died: 1 September 1972 (aged 76); Munich, Bavaria, West Germany
- Occupation: Actor
- Years active: 1930 - 1972 (film)

Hans Zesch-Ballot (20 May 1896 – 1 September 1972) was a German film actor.

== Filmography ==
Year	Title	Role	Notes
1930	Dolly Gets Ahead		
1931	Cadets	Oberleutnant von Brünning	
1932	The Magic Top Hat	Alfred	
1932	Spoiling the Game	Hans Donath - Sportjournalist	
1933	And the Plains Are Gleaming	Thury	
1934	Police Report	Kriminalkommissär Haupt	
1934	The Girlfriend of a Big Man	Hollberg, Berliner Theaterdirektor	
1934	A Man Wants to Get to Germany	English Naval Officer	
1934	Love and the First Railway	Schelling, Agent bei Bankier Fechner	
1934	Holiday From Myself	John Stone, Generalsekretär bei Steffenson	
1935	My Life for Maria Isabella	Major Sumerset	
1935	The Bird Seller	Der Kurfürst	
1936	The Czar's Courier	The Tsar	
1936	The Haunted Castle	Johann, Graf von Safferstätt	
1936	Winter in the Woods	Dr. Fritz Heidecke	
1936	Der Kaiser von Kalifornien	Gouverneur Alvaredo	
1936	The Traitor	Dr. Wehner	
1936	Ninety Minute Stopover	Alberto Basto	
1936	Es geht um mein Leben	Mikhail Stepan	
1936	The Night With the Emperor	Napoleon I.	
1937	Condottieri	D'Argentière	
1937	Talking About Jacqueline	Leslie Waddington	
1937	Tango Notturno	Kommissar Trent	
1938	The Tiger of Eschnapur	Fjedor Borodin	
1938	Wie einst im Mai	Baron von Uhlendorff	
1938	The Impossible Mister Pitt	Picard, Polizeiinspektor	
1938	Heimat		Uncredited
1938	Fools in the Snow	Vater Heinemann	
1938	Northern Lights	Staatsanwalt	
1938	Freight from Baltimore	William Morris, Generalagent	
1938	The Night of Decision	Konsul Brückmann	
1939	Three Wonderful Days		
1939	Woman Without a Past	Kriminalkommissar Schneidereit	
1939	Police Report	Benken, Kriminalkommissar	
1939	Central Rio	Kommissar Dossa	
1940	Seitensprünge	Schmidthenner, Exporteur	
1940	Die unvollkommene Liebe	Dr. von Cremona	
1941	Kopf hoch, Johannes!	Anstaltsleiter	
1941	Happiness Is the Main Thing		
1941	Riding for Germany	Brigadekommandeur	
1941	Thrice Wed	Rittmeister Graf Lievers	
1942	Attack on Baku	Barakoff, der Polizeiminister in Baku	
1942	To Be God One Time	Clusius - Theaterdirektor	
1942	Ein Zug fährt ab	Direktor Fritz Wolters	
1943	The Dark Day	Dr. Fabricius, Staatsanwalt	
1943	When the Young Wine Blossoms	Dr. Hall	
1944	The Buchholz Family	Onkel Fritz	
1944	Marriage of Affection	Onkel Fritz	
1945	The Man in the Saddle	Dr. Gustl Gallinger	
1945	Die Schenke zur ewigen Liebe	Bergassesor	
1948	Gaspary's Sons	Dr. Grove	
1949	Verführte Hände	Kommissar Meiners	
1949	Search for Majora	Prof. Mengler	
1950	Wedding with Erika	Colonel Hunter	
1950	The Rabanser Case	Verlagsdirektor	
1950	Third from the Right	Kriminalrat Bittner	
1951	Das späte Mädchen		
1951	Primanerinnen	Ursulas Vater	
1952	Nights on the Road	Inspector Busch	
1953	The Empress of China	Dr. Stansberg	
1953	Elephant Fury	Zoodirektor Thiele	
1953	Des Feuers Macht		
1954	The Crazy Clinic		
1955	The Plot to Assassinate Hitler	Generlleutnant Erich Hoepner	
1955	Love's Carnival	Oberstleutnant Wilhelm von Friese	
1958	Doctor Crippen Lives	Staatsanwalt	
1958	The Girl from the Marsh Croft	Richter	
1959	The Man Who Walked Through the Wall		
1959	The Day the Rains Came	Kriminalkommissar Bäumler	Uncredited
1960	The Hero of My Dreams	Günther Martens	
1962	The Puzzle of the Red Orchid	Sir John	Uncredited
1962	Freddy and the Song of the South Pacific		
1966	Witness Out of Hell	Dr. Berger	
1969	Hugo, the Woman Chaser	Eckehard Dingelfing	

== Bibliography ==
- Goble, Alan. The Complete Index to Literary Sources in Film. Walter de Gruyter, 1999.
