= The Chief Witness (film) =

1937 film

- Directed by: Georg Jacoby
- Written by: George Clifford Marivale (play); Johannes Eyken (play); Bernd Hofmann; Georg C. Klaren; Karl Lerbs
- Produced by: Hans Herbert Ulrich; Robert Wüllner
- Starring: Iván Petrovich; Sybille Schmitz; Sabine Peters
- Cinematography: Robert Baberske
- Edited by: Wolfgang Becker
- Music by: Walter Gronostay
- Production company: UFA
- Distributed by: UFA
- Release date: 21 April 1937
- Running time: 84 minutes
- Country: Germany
- Language: German

The Chief Witness (German: Die Kronzeugin) is a 1937 German crime drama film directed by Georg Jacoby and starring Iván Petrovich, Sybille Schmitz and Sabine Peters. It was shot at the Babelsberg Studios in Berlin. The film's sets were designed by the art directors Otto Hunte and Willy Schiller. Location shooting took place in the Krkonose Mountains in Czechoslovakia and Zugspitze in Bavaria.

== Synopsis ==
Elise, the former wife of composer Stefan Laurin, begs him to recover some letters from a man who has been blackmailing her. When he gets to the man's apartment, he finds him murdered and becomes the main suspect.

== Cast ==
- Iván Petrovich as Stefan Laurin
- Sybille Schmitz as Jelena Rakowska
- Sabine Peters as Nina Rakowska
- Gustav Waldau as Georg Radloff
- Elga Brink as Elise Laurin
- Ursula Grabley as Rose Bonnet
- Ursula Herking as Babett
- Rudolf Platte as Kriminalassistent Malapert
- Just Scheu as Dr. Sanders
- Georg H. Schnell as Gerichtsvorsitzender
- Ernst Dumcke as Staatsanwalt
- Werner Pledath as Untersuchungsrichter
- Hermann Pfeiffer as Regisseur
- Josefine Dora as Souffleuse Krüger
- Harry Hardt as Sänger
- Hanni Weisse as Stefan Laurins Wirtschafterin
- Olga Schaub as Gast bei Jelena
- Dorothea Thiess as Ninas Zimmermädchen
- Ellinor Büller as Krankenschwester
- Rudolf Klix as Konsul Runge
- Hermann Meyer-Falkow as Pianist
- Erich Walter as Diener Williams
- Wolfgang Grube as Arzt
- Willy Kaufman as Kriminalbeamter Lüdecke
- Gustav Mahnke as Schlafwagenschaffner
- Erich Dunskus as Kriminalkommissar Geller
- Eduard Bornträger as Polizeifotograf
- Max Wilmsen as Kriminalbeamter
- Christine Grabe as Krankenschwester
- Adi Solta as Inspizient

== Bibliography ==
- Bock, Hans-Michael & Töteberg, Michael . Das Ufa-Buch. Zweitausendeins, 1992.
- Giesen, Rolf. The Nosferatu Story: The Seminal Horror Film, Its Predecessors and Its Enduring Legacy. McFarland, 2019.
- Klaus, Ulrich J. Deutsche Tonfilme: Jahrgang 1937. Klaus-Archiv, 1988.
- Rentschler, Eric. The Ministry of Illusion: Nazi Cinema and Its Afterlife. Harvard University Press, 1996.
