= One Too Many on Board =

1935 film

- Directed by: Gerhard Lamprecht
- Written by: Fred Andreas (novel); Kurt Heuser; Philipp Lothar Mayring
- Starring: Lída Baarová; Albrecht Schoenhals; René Deltgen
- Cinematography: Robert Baberske
- Edited by: Milo Harbich
- Music by: Werner Bochmann
- Production company: UFA
- Distributed by: UFA
- Release date: 31 October 1935
- Running time: 85 minutes
- Country: Germany
- Language: German

One Too Many on Board (German: Einer zuviel an Bord) is a 1935 German drama film directed by Gerhard Lamprecht and starring Lída Baarová, Albrecht Schoenhals and René Deltgen. It was shot at the Babelsberg Studios in Berlin. The film's sets were designed by the art directors Otto Erdmann and Hans Sohnle. Some scenes were shot on location in Hamburg. A separate French-language version was also released.

== Cast ==
- Lída Baarová as Gerda Hegert
- Albrecht Schoenhals as Kapitän von Moltmann
- René Deltgen as I. Offizier Rohlfs
- Willy Birgel as Prosecutor Dr. Burger
- Ernst Karchow as Konsul Schelff
- Annemarie Steinsieck as Frau Konsul Schelff
- Jupp Hussels as Steward Lüdecke
- Alexander Engel as Ingenieur Sparkuhl
- Grethe Weiser as Lou Schmidt, Bardame
- Alexander Golling as Kommissar Sörensen
- Rudolf Platte as Maximilian Wresky, Schauspieler
- Alfred Karen as Tänzer
- Max Harry Ernst as Tänzer
- Hans Kettler as II. Offizier Mehlhorn
- Karl Dannemann as III. Offizier Ackermann
- Ernst Legal as Kriminalwachtmeister
- Rudolf Biebrach as Besatzungsmitglied
- Friedrich Ettel as Spelunkenwirt
- Karin Luesebrink as Bardame
- Edgar Nollet as Besatzungsmitglied
- Walter Schramm-Duncker as Inspizient
- Theodor Thony as Agent der Schiffslinie
- Hugo Werner-Kahle as Vorsitzender des Seegerichts
- Martha Ziegler as Portiersfrau
- Auguste Wanner-Kirsch

== Bibliography ==
- Bock, Hans-Michael; Bergfelder, Tim, eds. (2009). The Concise Cinegraph: Encyclopaedia of German Cinema. New York: Berghahn Books. ISBN 978-1-57181-655-9.
