= The Night of Decision (1938 film) =

1938 film directed by Nunzio Malasomma

- Directed by: Nunzio Malasomma
- Written by: Rolf E. Vanloo (short story); Philipp Lothar Mayring; Harald G. Petersson
- Produced by: Hans von Wolzogen
- Starring: Pola Negri; Hans Zesch-Ballot; Sabine Peters
- Cinematography: Karl Puth
- Edited by: Alexandra Anatra
- Music by: Lothar Brühne
- Production company: Fabrikation Deutscher Filme
- Distributed by: Panorama-Film
- Release date: 22 December 1938
- Running time: 89 minutes
- Country: Germany
- Language: German

The Night of Decision (German: Die Nacht der Entscheidung) is a 1938 German drama film directed by Nunzio Malasomma and starring Pola Negri, Hans Zesch-Ballot and Sabine Peters. It is based on a short story by Rolf E. Vanloo. Made at the time of the Munich Crisis, the film was Negri's final production in Nazi Germany. It was an independent film shot at the Grunewald Studios and Halensee Studios in Berlin. The film's sets were designed by the art directors Robert A. Dietrich and Artur Günther.

== Cast ==
- Pola Negri as Tessa Brückmann
- Hans Zesch-Ballot as Konsul Brückmann
- Sabine Peters as Gisela - seine Tochter
- Iván Petrovich as Fernando Alvarez
- Ernst Dumcke as Exzellenz Vivanco
- Hertha von Walther as Mrs. Vivanco
- Hans Richter as Pedro
- Annemarie Schäfer as Manuela
- Edwin Jürgensen as Direktor Lopez
- Hubert von Meyerinck as Chef des Modesalons
- Olga Limburg as Direktrice
- Bruno Ziener as Diener bei Brückmann
- Margarete Genske as Zofe bei Brückmann
- Erhart Stettner as Diener bei Alvarez
- Alice Treff as Lizzy
- Werner Pledath as Aufsichtsratsmitglied Berger
- Georg H. Schnell as Vorsitzender des Londoner Syndikats
- Eduard Bornträger as Platzanweiser im Tennisclub
- Josef Reithofer as Hotelportier in Hamburg
- Max Mothes as Gärtner bei Familie Brückmann
- Edith Meinhard as Vorführdame im Modesalon
- Hilla Höfer as Südamerikanische Tänzerin
- Fritz Draeger as Tänzer auf dem Ball

== Bibliography ==
- Kotowski, Mariusz (2014). Pola Negri: Hollywood's First Femme Fatale. University Press of Kentucky. ISBN 978-0-8131-4489-4.
