= The Glass Ball =

1937 film

- Directed by: Peter Stanchina
- Written by: Fritz Rau
- Produced by: Otto Ernst Lubitz
- Starring: Albrecht Schoenhals; Sabine Peters; Hilde von Stolz
- Cinematography: E.W. Fiedler
- Edited by: Gottlieb Madl
- Music by: Hans Carste
- Production company: Atalanta-Film
- Distributed by: Bavaria Film; Kiba Filmverleih (Austria)
- Release date: 12 April 1937
- Running time: 86 minutes
- Country: Germany
- Language: German

The Glass Ball (German: Die gläserne Kugel) is a 1937 German drama film directed by Peter Stanchina and starring Albrecht Schoenhals, Sabine Peters, and Hilde von Stolz.

The film's sets were designed by the art directors Otto Guelstorff and Hans Minzloff. Location shooting took place in Berlin and Vienna in late 1936.

== Cast ==
- Albrecht Schoenhals as Axel von Schack
- Sabine Peters as Nelly, Artistin
- Hilde von Stolz as Nina Sylten
- Paul Henckels as Franz Sylten, später Trix
- Theodor Loos as Dr. Sylten
- Ernst Dumcke as Hofrat Dr. Hörnigger
- Walter Steinbeck as Zirkusdirektor Lenz
- Curt Lucas as Diener
- Ernst Legal as Trödler
- Karl Etlinger as Mr. Duval
- Carl Auen as Untersuchungsrichter
- Max Hochstetter as Kriminalkommissar Weidner
- Fred Goebel as 2. Zirkusdirektor
- Willi Stasser as Fred
- Hans Hemes as Paul
- Bruno Ziener as Juwelier
- Otto Stoeckel as Notar

== Bibliography ==
- Bock, Hans-Michael; Bergfelder, Tim, eds. (2009). The Concise Cinegraph: Encyclopaedia of German Cinema. New York: Berghahn Books. ISBN 978-1-57181-655-9.
