= Light Cavalry (1935 German film) =

1935 film

- Directed by: Werner Hochbaum
- Written by: Heinz Lorenz-Lambrecht (novel); Franz Rauch
- Produced by: Alfred Zeisler
- Starring: Marika Rökk; Heinz von Cleve; Fritz Kampers
- Cinematography: Bruno Timm
- Edited by: Arnfried Heyne
- Music by: Hans-Otto Borgmann
- Production company: UFA
- Distributed by: UFA
- Release date: 14 October 1935
- Running time: 88 minutes
- Country: Germany
- Language: German

Light Cavalry (German: Leichte Kavallerie) is a 1935 German musical film directed by Werner Hochbaum and starring Marika Rökk, Heinz von Cleve, and Fritz Kampers. A separate French-language version Light Cavalry was also released with Mona Goya in the starring role.

The film's sets were designed by the art directors Carl Böhm and Erich Czerwonski.

== Plot ==
The film begins with scenes related to the Cherubini circus. In the evenings, the circus people go to a nearby inn that belongs to Rosika's stepfather. She doesn't want to be there for the guests and dance for them, so she leaves the house and seeks shelter with Rux, the circus clown.

Rux has developed a revue act for the circus, which revolves around a solo dancer and rider. The director Cherubini likes that, and there is also a female main character: Rosika. She can dance, but still has to learn to ride. While working with the horses, she meets Geza, who has just been hired as a stable boy. He is courting her, so Rux fears losing her for his big circus act. So he gets Geza under a pretext to leave the circus. He makes his way to his brother, and we learn that they are the Hungarian nobles from Raskos. But now Cherubini has fallen in love with Rosika. But when she rejects him, he throws Rux and Rosika out.

The two artists try in vain to get a place with another circus with their new revue number "Leichte Kavallerie". Finally they get an engagement in Budapest. Cherubini and the employees of his circus appear at the premiere, Geza also appears. After the first big performance, Rux talks to Geza and admits that he downplayed Rosika's affection for him at the time so as not to lose her for his program.

A second large dance scene follows, which ends with thunderous applause. Geza rushes to Rosika, there is a happy ending.

== Cast ==
- Marika Rökk as Rosika
- Heinz von Cleve as Stallburschen Geza von Rakos
- Fritz Kampers as Zirkusdirektor Cherubini
- Karl Hellmer as Clown Rux
- Hans Adalbert Schlettow as Schulreiter Palato
- Lotte Lorring as Margit, Palatos Frau
- Cilly Feindt as Kunstreiterin Hanni
- Oskar Sima as Gastwirt Pietro
- F.W. Schröder-Schrom as Zirkusdirektor Franconi
- Hilde Sessak as Kellnerin Catella
- Horst Birr
- Josef Reithofer
- S.O. Schoening
- Jac Diehl
- Erich Haußmann
- Helmut Bautzmann
- Kurt Getke
- Lothar Glathe
- Alfred Karen as Ein Tänzer
- Manfred Meurer
- Friedrich Teitge as Der Regisseur
- Ewald Wenck

== Bibliography ==
- Kreimeier, Klaus (1999). The Ufa Story: A History of Germany's Greatest Film Company, 1918–1945. Berkeley: University of California Press. ISBN 978-0-520-22069-0.
