= Brothers (1929 German film) =

1929 film

- Directed by: Werner Hochbaum
- Written by: Werner Hochbaum
- Produced by: Werner Hochbaum
- Cinematography: Gustav Berger
- Production company: Werner Hochbaum Filmproduktion
- Release date: 28 April 1929
- Country: Germany
- Languages: Silent; German intertitles

Full film

Brothers (German: Brüder) is a 1929 German silent drama film directed by Werner Hochbaum. The film was shot on location in the dockyards of Hamburg using a mainly amateur cast. Hochbaum was closely associated with the Social Democratic Party at the time and made several films portraying working class conditions.

== Partial cast ==
- Gyula Balogh as Der Sohn
- Erna Schumacher as Die alte Mutter
- Ilse Berger

== Bibliography ==
- Bock, Hans-Michael; Bergfelder, Tim, eds. (2009). The Concise Cinegraph: Encyclopaedia of German Cinema. New York: Berghahn Books. ISBN 978-1-57181-655-9.
