= Edith Meinhard =

German actress

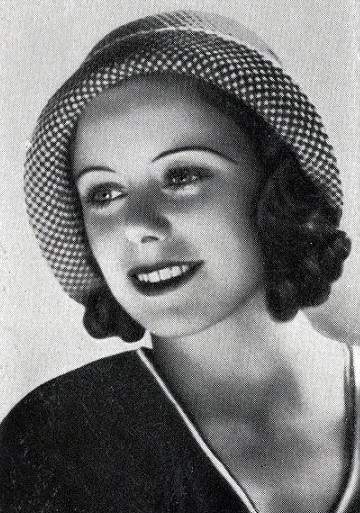
- Born: 22 November 1908; Berlin, German Empire
- Died: 26 June 1968; West Berlin, West Germany
- Occupation: Actress
- Years active: 1928–1943 (film)

Edith Meinhard (22. November 1908 as Herma Ruth Edith Kötteritzsch in Berlin - 26. June 1968 in West-Berlin) was a German actress, who appeared in more than fifty films during her career, including the 1929 film Diary of a Lost Girl.

== Life and work ==
Little is known about Edith Meinhard, although in the 1930s she was one of the busiest actresses in Germany. She made her silent film debut at the age of 10. A few years later, the Defu production company hired her for two silent films. In 1929 she appeared as Erika, the friend of Thymian (Louise Brooks), in G. W. Pabst's critically acclaimed film Diary of a Lost Girl.

Her transition to sound film went smoothly, and Edith Meinhard played a wide range of supporting roles, including prostitutes, secretaries and maids, until the outbreak of the war in 1939. Edith Meinhard's last film was made in the spring of 1943, shortly before the heavy Allied bombing of Berlin began.

== Selected filmography ==
- Knights of the Night (1928)
- Men Without Work (1929)
- The Veil Dancer (1929)
- Diary of a Lost Girl (1929)
- The Man in the Dark (1930)
- Inquest (1931)
- Rasputin, Demon with Women (1932)
- The Invisible Front (1932)
- Gypsy Blood (1934)
- Knockout (1935)
- Game on Board (1936)
- The Empress's Favourite (1936)
- The Bashful Casanova (1936)
- The Irresistible Man (1937)
- Talking About Jacqueline (1937)
- The Blue Fox (1938)
- Covered Tracks (1938)
- The Holm Murder Case (1938)
- The Night of Decision (1938)
- The Leghorn Hat (1939)
- We Danced Around the World (1939)

== Bibliography ==
- Campbell, Russell (2006). Marked Women: Prostitutes and Prostitution in the Cinema. Madison: University of Wisconsin Press. ISBN 978-0-299-21253-7.
