= Werner Hochbaum =

German screenwriter, film producer and director

Werner Hochbaum (7 March 1899, Kiel – 15 April 1946) was a German screenwriter, film producer and director.

== Selected filmography ==
- Brothers (1929)
- Raid in St. Pauli (1932)
- Tugboat M 17 (1933)
- Judgment of Lake Balaton (Hungary/Austria, 1933)
- Life Begins Tomorrow (1933)
- Suburban Cabaret (Austria, 1935)
- The Eternal Mask (Austria/Switzerland, 1935)
- Light Cavalry (German) (1935), Light Cavalry (French) (1935)
- Schatten der Vergangenheit (Austria, 1936)
- Hannerl and Her Lovers (Austria, 1936)
- The Empress's Favourite (1936)
- Talking About Jacqueline (1937)
- A Girl Goes Ashore (1938)
- Drei Unteroffiziere (1939)

== Bibliography ==
- Bergfelder, Tim & Bock, Hans-Michael. The Concise Cinegraph: Encyclopedia of German Cinema. Berghahn Books, 2009.
- Kreimeier, Klaus. The Ufa story: a history of Germany's greatest film company, 1918-1945. University of California Press, 1999.
