= List of German films of 1939 =

This is a list of the most notable films produced in the Cinema of Germany in 1939.

== A–L ==
Title	Director	Cast	Genre	Notes
Alarm at Station III	Philipp Lothar Mayring	Gustav Fröhlich, Kirsten Heiberg, Jutta Freybe	Crime	
Asew	Phil Jutzi	Fritz Rasp, Olga Chekhova, Hilde von Stolz	Thriller	
Bachelor's Paradise	Kurt Hoffmann	Heinz Rühmann, Josef Sieber, Trude Marlen	Comedy	
Bel Ami	Willi Forst	Olga Chekhova	Period drama	
Between River and Steppe	Géza von Bolváry	Attila Hörbiger, Heidemarie Hatheyer, Margit Symo	Drama	Co-production with Hungary
Cadets	Karl Ritter	Mathias Wieman, Carsta Löck	War	Not put into general release until December 1941
Central Rio	Erich Engels	Leny Marenbach, Camilla Horn, Iván Petrovich	Drama	
Congo Express	Eduard von Borsody	Marianne Hoppe, Willy Birgel, René Deltgen	Adventure	
The Curtain Falls	Georg Jacoby	Anneliese Uhlig, Elfie Mayerhofer, Hilde Sessak	Crime	
D III 88	Herbert Maisch, Hans Bertram	Christian Kayßler, Otto Wernicke, Heinz Welzel, Hermann Braun, Adolf Fischer, Horst Birr	Drama	Film from the perspective of a veteran officer about the November Revolution
The Desert Song	Paul Martin	Zarah Leander, Friedrich Domin, Gustav Knuth	Drama	
Detours to Happiness	Fritz Peter Buch	Lil Dagover, Ewald Balser, Viktor Staal	Drama	
Drei Unteroffiziere	Werner Hochbaum	Albert Hehn, Fritz Genschow	War drama	
Escape in the Dark	Arthur Maria Rabenalt	Hertha Feiler, Joachim Gottschalk	Crime	
The False Step	Gustaf Gründgens	Marianne Hoppe, Karl Ludwig Diehl	Drama	
The Fourth Is Not Coming	Max W. Kimmich	Ferdinand Marian, Werner Hinz, Dorothea Wieck	Mystery	
Gold in New Frisco	Paul Verhoeven	Hans Söhnker, Alexander Golling	Western	
The Golden Mask	Hans H. Zerlett	Albert Matterstock, Hilde Weissner, Rudi Godden	Drama	
The Governor	Viktor Tourjansky	Brigitte Horney, Willy Birgel, Hannelore Schroth	Drama	
The Green Emperor	Paul Mundorf	Gustav Diessl, Carola Höhn	Crime	
Hello Janine!	Carl Boese	Johannes Heesters, Rudi Godden	Musical	
Her First Experience	Josef von Báky	Ilse Werner, Johannes Riemann	Romance	
A Hopeless Case	Erich Engel	Jenny Jugo, Karl Ludwig Diehl	Comedy	
Hotel Sacher	Erich Engel	Sybille Schmitz, Willy Birgel, Wolf Albach-Retty	Drama	
I Am Sebastian Ott	Willi Forst	Willi Forst, Gustav Diessl, Trude Marlen	Crime	
In the Name of the People	Erich Engels	Rudolf Fernau, Fritz Kampers, Rolf Weih	Crime	
The Journey to Tilsit	Veit Harlan	Kristina Söderbaum, Philip Dorn, Anna Dammann	Drama	a.k.a. The Trip to Tilsit
Kitty and the World Conference	Helmut Käutner	Hannelore Schroth, Fritz Odemar, Christian Gollong	Comedy	
The Leghorn Hat	Wolfgang Liebeneiner	Heinz Rühmann, Herti Kirchner, Christl Mardayn	Comedy	
Legion Condor	Karl Ritter	Paul Hartmann, Albert Hehn	War	
Liberated Hands	Hans Schweikart	Brigitte Horney, Olga Chekhova	Drama	
Das Lied der Wüste	Paul Martin	Zarah Leander, Friedrich Domin, Gustav Knuth	Drama	Song of the Desert
The Life and Loves of Tschaikovsky	Carl Froelich	Zarah Leander, Aribert Wäscher	Historical romance	
Linen from Ireland	Heinz Helbig	Irene von Meyendorff; Friedl Haerlin	Comedy drama	A comic anti-Semitic film in which a Jew tries to import linen duty-free from Ireland

== M–Z ==
Title	Director	Cast	Genre	Notes
Madame Butterfly	Carmine Gallone	Maria Cebotari, Fosco Giachetti, Lucie Englisch	Drama	Co-production with Italy
Man for Man	Robert A. Stemmle	Gisela Uhlen, Viktoria von Ballasko, Gustav Knuth	Drama	
Maria Ilona	Géza von Bolváry	Paula Wessely, Willy Birgel	Historical/Drama	
Marionette	Carmine Gallone	Beniamino Gigli, Carla Rust	Comedy	German/Italian co-production
Marriage in Small Doses	Johannes Meyer	Leny Marenbach, Johannes Riemann	Musical comedy	
Men Are That Way	Arthur Maria Rabenalt	Hertha Feiler, Hans Söhnker	Drama	
The Merciful Lie	Werner Klingler	Hilde Krahl, Elisabeth Flickenschildt, Ernst von Klipstein	Drama	
Midsummer Night's Fire	Arthur Maria Rabenalt	Anna Dammann, Ernst von Klipstein, Gertrud Meyen	Drama	
Mistake of the Heart	Bernd Hofmann, Alfred Stöger	Paul Hartmann, Leny Marenbach, Käthe Dorsch	Drama	
A Mother's Love	Gustav Ucicky	Käthe Dorsch, Paul Hörbiger, Wolf Albach-Retty	Drama	Mutterliebe; propaganda film about family and race
New Year's Eve on Alexanderplatz	Richard Schneider-Edenkoben	Hannes Stelzer, Carl Raddatz, Jutta Freybe	Drama	
Opera Ball	Géza von Bolváry	Heli Finkenzeller, Fita Benkhoff	Musical	
Police Report	Rudolf van der Noss	Lola Müthel, Hans Zesch-Ballot, Erich Fiedler	Crime	
Renate in the Quartet	Paul Verhoeven	Käthe von Nagy, Hans Brausewetter	Musical comedy	
The Right to Love	Joe Stöckel	Magda Schneider, Anneliese Uhlig, Viktor Staal	Drama	
Robert and Bertram	Hans Heinz Zerlett	Rudi Godden, Kurt Seifert	Comedy	
Robert Koch	Hans Steinhoff	Emil Jannings, Werner Krauss, Viktoria von Ballasko	Biopic	
The Scoundrel	Hans Deppe	Hans Moser, Josefine Dora	Comedy	
The Sensational Casilla Trial	Eduard von Borsody	Heinrich George, Jutta Freybe, Albert Hehn	Crime drama	
Shoulder Arms	Jürgen von Alten	F.W. Schröder-Schrom, Rolf Moebius	Drama	
Sighs of Spain	Benito Perojo	Miguel Ligero, Estrellita Castro, Roberto Rey	Comedy	Co-production with Spain
The Singing Fool	Johannes Meyer	Beniamino Gigli, Kirsten Heiberg, Hilde Körber	Musical	Co-production with Italy
The Song of Aixa	Florián Rey	Imperio Argentina, Manuel Luna, José Prada	Drama	Spanish-language. Co-production with Spain
Stars of Variety	Josef von Báky	La Jana, Christl Mardayn, Karin Hardt	Drama	Co-production with Hungary
The Strange Woman	Roger von Norman	Eugen Klöpfer, Elisabeth Wendt, Karl Dannemann	Drama	
Target in the Clouds	Wolfgang Liebeneiner	Albert Matterstock, Leny Marenbach	Drama	
Three Fathers for Anna	Carl Boese	Ilse Werner, Hans Stüwe	Comedy	
Three Wonderful Days	Fritz Kirchhoff	Gustav Waldau, Gina Falckenberg	Drama	
Twelve Minutes After Midnight	Johannes Guter	Geraldine Katt, Ursula Herking, René Deltgen	Crime comedy	
Uproar in Damascus	Gustav Ucicky	Brigitte Horney, Joachim Gottschalk	Thriller	
Ursula Under Suspicion	Karlheinz Martin	Luli Deste, Anneliese Uhlig, Viktor Staal	Mystery	
Water for Canitoga	Herbert Selpin	Hans Albers	western	Water for Canitoga; set in Canada
The Wedding Trip	Karl Ritter	Mathias Wieman, Angela Salloker, Françoise Rosay	Historical drama	
We Danced Around the World	Karl Anton	Irene von Meyendorff, Carola Höhn	Musical	
Who's Kissing Madeleine?	Victor Janson	Magda Schneider, Albert Matterstock	Comedy	
Wibbel the Tailor	Viktor de Kowa	Erich Ponto, Fita Benkhoff	Historical comedy	
A Woman Like You	Viktor Tourjansky	Brigitte Horney, Joachim Gottschalk	Romance	
Woman Without a Past	Nunzio Malasomma	Sybille Schmitz, Albrecht Schoenhals, Maria von Tasnady	Drama	

== Documentaries ==
Title	Director	Cast	Genre	Notes
Alpenkorps im Angriff	Gösta Nordhaus		documentary	
Arbeitskameraden - Sportkameraden	Hans Heinrich		documentary	
Deutsches Land in Afrika	Johannes Häussler		documentary	German Land in Africa;
Dschungel-Geheimnisse	Kurt Rupli		documentary	
Eger, eine alte deutsche Stadt	Rudolf Gutscher		documentary	
Fallschirmjäger	E.K. Beltzig		documentary	
Gautag der NSDAP Gau Mecklenburg			documentary	
Glaube und Schönheit	E.K. Beltzig		documentary	Available online here
Guatemala	Hans Helfritz		documentary	
Die jüngsten der Luftwaffe	Kurt Rupli		documentary	
Können Tiere denken?	Fritz Heydenreich		documentary	
Nach Feierabend	Rudolf van der Noss		documentary	
Mexiko	Hans Helfritz		documentary	
Nach Feierabend	Rudolf van der Noss		documentary	
Parade - Hitler's 50 Geburstage	Kurt Rupli		documentary	
Im Reiche der Liliputaner	Ulrich K.T. Schultz		Documentary	
Rheinland	Johannes Guter		documentary	
Romancero marroquí	Enrique Domínguez Rodiño, Carlos Velo		documentary	
Salzburg, die Festspielstadt	Kurt Rupli		documentary	
Schicksalswende	Johannes Häussler, Walter Scheunemann		documentary	
Schiff 754	Hans Heinrich		documentary	
Sinnvolle Zwecklosigkeiten	Fritz Heydenreich		documentary	
Sonne über dem Spessart - Aschaffenburg und seine Umgebung	Hans Heinrich		documentary	
Steinschlangen und Vogelmenschen	Hans Helfritz		documentary	
Walfänger in der Antarktis	Gerhard A. Donner			Whaling Ship in the Antarctic; 55 minute documentary
Wegweiser zur Gesundheit	Curt A. Engel		documentary	
Der Westwall	Fritz Hippler			The West Wall; propaganda film about the Siegfried Line
Wir fahren nach Amerika	Kurt Engel		documentary	
Das Wort aus Stein	Kurt Rupli		documentary	

== Short films ==
Title	Director	Cast	Genre	Notes
Elbefahrt	Rudolf Gutscher		short	
Tanz der Farben	Hans Fischerkoesen		animation	
Ein Lied verklingt				In Agfacolor
Wagen Nr. 1 kämpft sich seinen Weg	Gert Fröbe			

== See also ==
- 1939 in Germany

== Bibliography ==
- Klaus, Ulrich J. Deutsche Tonfilme: Jahrgang 1939. Klaus-Archiv, 1988.
- Rentschler, Eric. The Ministry of Illusion: Nazi Cinema and Its Afterlife. Harvard University Press, 1996.
