= List of Tobis Film films =

The German production and distribution company Tobis Film operated between 1929 and 1945. It was one of the four biggest German studios of this period along with Bavaria Film, Terra Film and UFA. Although the company ceased production following the collapse of Nazi Germany and the country's occupation by the Allies, several previously unreleased Tobis films were distributed in the postwar era.

The list does not included foreign-language films produced by Tobis as multiple-language versions of their German works. A number of Tobis films were handled by the subsidiary distributors Rota Film, Europa Film and Neue Deutsch Lichtspiel-Syndikat.

Musical Director: Kurt Adler

== 1920s ==
Release date	Title	Director	Notes
April 1929	Paganini in Venice	Frank Clifford	Short film
September 1929	Land Without Women	Carmine Gallone	Produced by Felsom Film

== 1930s ==
Release date	Title	Director	Notes
August 1930	The Cabinet of Doctor Larifari	Robert Wohlmuth	
January 1931	Different Morals	Gerhard Lamprecht	
February 1931	The Threepenny Opera	Georg Wilhelm Pabst	
December 1931	The Night Without Pause	Andrew Marton	
December 1931	The Trunks of Mr. O.F.	Andrew Marton	
February 1932	A Tremendously Rich Man	Alexis Granowsky	
February 1932	Under False Flag	Johannes Meyer	
March 1932	Here's Berlin	Julien Duvivier	Co-production with France
September 1932	I Do Not Want to Know Who You Are	Géza von Bolváry	
November 1932	The Tsar's Diamond	Max Neufeld	
November 1932	Madame Makes Her Exit	Wilhelm Thiele	
November 1932	The Secret of Johann Orth	Willi Wolff	
January 1933	Madame Wants No Children	Hans Steinhoff	Co-production with Austria
February 1933	The Big Bluff	Georg Jacoby	
March 1933	Hundred Days	Franz Wenzler	
March 1933	Manolescu, Prince of Thieves	Georg C. Klaren, Willi Wolff	
May 1933	Tell Me Who You Are	Georg Jacoby	
August 1933	Little Man, What Now?	Fritz Wendhausen	
September 1933	Ripening Youth	Carl Froelich	
October 1933	Dream of the Rhine	Herbert Selpin	
November 1933	The Judas of Tyrol	Franz Osten	
December 1933	The Hunter from Kurpfalz	Carl Behr	
January 1934	Police Report	Georg Jacoby	
March 1934	Adventure on the Southern Express	Erich Waschneck	
March 1934	The World Without a Mask	Harry Piel	
May 1934	Pappi	Arthur Maria Rabenalt	
July 1934	Paganini	E. W. Emo	
August 1934	The Daring Swimmer	Georg Jacoby	
August 1934	Music in the Blood	Erich Waschneck	
August 1934	What Am I Without You	Arthur Maria Rabenalt	
September 1934	The Cousin from Nowhere	Georg Zoch	
September 1934	Heinz in the Moon	Robert A. Stemmle	
November 1934	Love Conquers All	Georg Zoch	
January 1935	The Old and the Young King	Hans Steinhoff	
January 1935	Peter, Paul and Nanette	Erich Engels	
January 1935	Sergeant Schwenke	Carl Froelich	
February 1935	My Life for Maria Isabella	Erich Waschneck	
March 1935	Demon of the Himalayas	Andrew Marton	Co-production with Switzerland
May 1935	Hero for a Night	Martin Fric	Co-production with Czechoslovakia
July 1935	Eva	Johannes Riemann	Made in Austria
August 1935	Stradivari	Géza von Bolváry	
August 1935	The Private Life of Louis XIV	Carl Froelich	
August 1935	The Blonde Carmen	Victor Janson	
September 1935	The Bird Seller	E. W. Emo	
September 1935	If It Were Not for Music	Carmine Gallone	
September 1935	The Valiant Navigator	Hans Deppe	
September 1935	Lessons in Love	Carl Hoffmann	
October 1935	I Was Jack Mortimer	Carl Froelich	
October 1935	The Man with the Paw	Rudolf van der Noss	
October 1935	Lady Windermere's Fan	Heinz Hilpert	
November 1935	Mazurka	Willi Forst	
November 1935	Victoria	Carl Hoffmann	
November 1935	The Schimeck Family	E.W. Emo	
December 1935	The Student of Prague	Arthur Robison	
December 1935	Trouble Backstairs	Veit Harlan	
December 1935	The Valley of Love	Hans Steinhoff	
January 1936	The Call of the Jungle	Harry Piel	
January 1936	The Dreamer	Carl Froelich	
January 1936	The Merry Wives	Carl Hoffmann	
February 1936	Across the Desert	Johann Alexander Hübler-Kahla	
February 1936	The Czar's Courier	Richard Eichberg	
February 1936	The Bashful Casanova	Karel Lamac	
March 1936	The Abduction of the Sabine Women	Robert A. Stemmle	
March 1936	Martha	Karl Anton	
May 1936	Family Parade	Fritz Wendhausen	
June 1936	The Mysterious Mister X	Johann Alexander Hübler-Kahla	
June 1936	Tomfoolery	Willi Forst	
July 1936	Der Kaiser von Kalifornien	Luis Trenker	
August 1936	The Castle in Flanders	Géza von Bolváry	
August 1936	Stronger Than Regulations	Jürgen von Alten	
August 1936	Three Girls for Schubert	E.W. Emo	
September 1936	Escapade	Erich Waschneck	
October 1936	If We All Were Angels	Carl Froelich	
October 1936	Maria the Maid	Veit Harlan	
October 1936	A Wedding Dream	Erich Engel	
October 1936	Where the Lark Sings	Carl Lamac	
October 1936	A Woman of No Importance	Hans Steinhoff	
November 1936	Intermezzo	Josef von Báky	
November 1936	The Violet of Potsdamer Platz	Johann Alexander Hübler-Kahla	
December 1936	Doctor Engel	Johannes Riemann	
December 1936	The Night With the Emperor	Erich Engel	
December 1936	Port Arthur	Nicolas Farkas	
December 1936	Susanne in the Bath	Jürgen von Alten	
January 1937	Truxa	Hans H. Zerlett	
February 1937	Fridericus	Johannes Meyer	
February 1937	His Best Friend	Harry Piel	
February 1937	Togger	Jürgen von Alten	
March 1937	The Divine Jetta	Erich Waschneck	
March 1937	The Ruler	Veit Harlan	
April 1937	Such Great Foolishness	Carl Froelich	
April 1937	Gordian the Tyrant	Fred Sauer	
June 1937	Land of Love	Reinhold Schünzel	
August 1937	Crooks in Tails	Johannes Riemann	
August 1937	Love Can Lie	Heinz Helbig	
September 1937	The Citadel of Warsaw	Fritz Peter Buch	
October 1937	The Broken Jug	Gustav Ucicky	
October 1937	The Irresistible Man	Géza von Bolváry	
October 1937	The Coral Princess	Victor Janson	
October 1937	The Model Husband	Wolfgang Liebeneiner	
October 1937	Signal in the Night	Richard Schneider-Edenkoben	
November 1937	Another World	Alfred Stöger	Co-production with France
December 1937	Mother Song	Carmine Gallone	
January 1938	The Roundabouts of Handsome Karl	Carl Froelich	
February 1938	Adventure in Warsaw	Carl Boese	Co-production with Poland
February 1938	The Marriage Swindler	Herbert Selpin	
March 1938	The Stars Shine	Hans H. Zerlett	
March 1938	Yvette	Wolfgang Liebeneiner	
April 1938	After Midnight	Carl Hoffmann	
April 1938	The Great and the Little Love	Josef von Báky	
July 1938	People Who Travel	Jacques Feyder	
July 1938	I Love You	Herbert Selpin	
August 1938	Covered Tracks	Veit Harlan	
August 1938	Fools in the Snow	Hans Deppe	
September 1938	The Day After the Divorce	Paul Verhoeven	
September 1938	The Gambler	Gerhard Lamprecht	
October 1938	The Jumping Jack	Karlheinz Martin	
October 1938	Two Women	Hans H. Zerlett	
November 1938	Dance on the Volcano	Hans Steinhoff	
November 1938	Napoleon Is to Blame for Everything	Curt Goetz	
December 1938	Adventure in Love	Hans H. Zerlett	
December 1938	Sergeant Berry	Herbert Selpin	
February 1939	Bel Ami	Willi Forst	
March 1939	The Fourth Is Not Coming	Max W. Kimmich	
March 1939	New Year's Eve on Alexanderplatz	Richard Schneider-Edenkoben	
July 1939	Robert and Bertram	Hans Heinz Zerlett	
August 1939	Renate in the Quartet	Paul Verhoeven	
August 1939	The Scoundrel	Hans Deppe	
August 1939	Wibbel the Tailor	Viktor de Kowa	
August 1939	The Merciful Lie	Werner Klingler	
September 1939	Robert Koch	Hans Steinhoff	
October 1939	D III 88	Herbert Maisch	
November 1939	The Journey to Tilsit	Veit Harlan	
December 1939	We Danced Around the World	Karl Anton	
December 1939	Der singende Tor	Johannes Meyer	

== 1940s ==
Release date	Title	Director	Notes
February 1940	A Man Astray	Herbert Selpin	
March 1940	The Star of Rio	Karl Anton	
April 1940	The Fox of Glenarvon	Max W. Kimmich	
August 1940	The Three Codonas	Arthur Maria Rabenalt	
August 1940	The Vulture Wally	Hans Steinhoff	
August 1940	Trenck the Pandur	Herbert Selpin	
September 1940	Falstaff in Vienna	Leopold Hainisch	
December 1940	Bismarck	Wolfgang Liebeneiner	
February 1941	Battle Squadron Lützow	Hans Bertram	
February 1941	My Life for Ireland	Max W. Kimmich	
April 1941	Ohm Krüger	Hans Steinhoff	
July 1941	Pedro Will Hang	Veit Harlan	
July 1941	Mistress Moon	Theo Lingen	
October 1941	Jakko	Fritz Peter Buch	
November 1941	Her Other Self	Wolfgang Liebeneiner	
December 1941	People in the Storm	Fritz Peter Buch	
January 1942	Two in a Big City	Volker von Collande	
March 1942	The Great King	Veit Harlan	
April 1942	A Gust of Wind	Walter Felsenstein	
April 1942	The Night in Venice	Paul Verhoeven	
April 1942	The Thing About Styx	Karl Anton	
May 1942	The Rainer Case	Paul Verhoeven	
November 1942	My Friend Josephine	Hans H. Zerlett	
December 1942	My Wife Theresa	Arthur Maria Rabenalt	
January 1943	The Big Number	Karl Anton	
March 1943	A Flea in Her Ear	Paul Heidemann	
March 1943	Kohlhiesel's Daughters	Kurt Hoffmann	
April 1943	An Old Heart Becomes Young Again	Erich Engel	
May 1943	Laugh Bajazzo	Leopold Hainisch	
June 1943	Romance in a Minor Key	Helmut Käutner	
July 1943	The Bath in the Barn	Wolfgang Staudte	
October 1943	I'll Carry You in My Arms	Kurt Hoffmann	
November 1943	Titanic	Herbert Selpin	
December 1943	Bravo Acrobat!	Volker von Collande	
December 1943	Light of Heart	Carl Boese	
January 1944	A Beautiful Day	Philipp Lothar Mayring	
January 1944	Harald Arrives at Nine	Carl Boese	
July 1944	The Degenhardts	Werner Klingler	
December 1944	Philharmonic	Paul Verhoeven	
January 1945	Anna Alt	Werner Klingler	
February 1945	The Years Pass	Günther Rittau	
September 1946	Peter Voss, Thief of Millions	Karl Anton	Originally shot in 1945
November 1948	An Everyday Story	Günther Rittau	Originally shot in 1944
December 1948	The Court Concert	Paul Verhoeven	Originally shot in 1944
October 1949	The Appeal to Conscience	Karl Anton	Originally shot in 1944

== See also ==
- List of UFA films

== Bibliography ==
- Bergfelder, Tim. International Adventures: German Popular Cinema and European Co-Productions in the 1960s. Berhahn Books, 2005.
- Bock, Hans-Michael . Die Tobis 1928-1945: eine kommentierte Filmografie. Edition Text + Kritik, 2003.
- Kreimeier, Klaus. The Ufa Story: A History of Germany's Greatest Film Company, 1918-1945. University of California Press, 1999.
