= Fools in the Snow =

1938 film

- Directed by: Hans Deppe
- Written by: Walter Zerlett-Olfenius; Hans Deppe
- Based on: Fools in the Snow by Roland Betsch
- Produced by: Alfred Bittins
- Starring: Anny Ondra; Paul Klinger; Gisela Schlüter
- Cinematography: Hans Schneeberger
- Edited by: Ella Ensink
- Music by: Heinrich Strecker
- Production company: Cinephon Film
- Distributed by: Tobis Film
- Release date: 17 August 1938
- Running time: 80 minutes
- Country: Germany
- Language: German

Fools in the Snow (German: Narren im Schnee) is a 1938 German comedy film directed by Hans Deppe and starring Anny Ondra, Paul Klinger and Gisela Schlüter. It was shot at the Johannisthal Studios in Berlin and on location in South Tyrol in the Dolomites. The film's sets were designed by the art directors Robert A. Dietrich and Artur Günther.

== Cast ==
- Anny Ondra as Dorothee Heinemann
- Paul Klinger as Toni Notnagel
- Gisela Schlüter as Margot
- Paul Richter as Dr. Hans Sieck
- Eva Tinschmann as Ottilie Konstantin
- Willi Schaeffers as Professor Konstantin
- Thorby Wörndle as Der lange Tobias
- Karel Stepanek as Rolf Pinkenkötter
- Paul Heidemann as Baron Göckler
- Edna Greyff as Lisa 'Krümel'
- Günther Vogdt as Gustl 'Knirps'
- Werner Schott as Der Sonderbare
- Hans Zesch-Ballot as Vater Heinemann
- Rudolf Vones as Der schöne Valentino
- Beppo Brem as Hausdiener Franzl
- Hermine Ziegler as Wirtschafterin Rosa
- Josef Eichheim as Sepp Notnagel

== Bibliography ==
- Hales, Barbara, Petrescu, Mihaela and Weinstein, Valerie. Continuity and Crisis in German Cinema, 1928-1936. Boydell & Brewer, 2016. ISBN 978-1-57113-935-1.
- Klaus, Ulrich J. Deutsche Tonfilme: Jahrgang 1938. Klaus-Archiv, 1988. ISBN 978-3-927352-04-9.
