= The Great and the Little Love =

1938 film

- German: Die große und die kleine Liebe
- Directed by: Josef von Báky
- Written by: Heinrich Oberländer
- Produced by: Eberhard Klagemann; Helmut Schreiber
- Starring: Jenny Jugo; Gustav Fröhlich; Rudi Godden; Maria Koppenhöfer
- Cinematography: Friedl Behn-Grund
- Edited by: Wolfgang Becker
- Music by: Hans Sommer
- Production company: Klagemann-Film
- Distributed by: Tobis Film
- Release date: 29 April 1938
- Running time: 82 minutes
- Country: Germany
- Language: German

The Great and the Little Love (German: Die große und die kleine Liebe) is a 1938 German comedy film directed by Josef von Báky and starring Jenny Jugo, Gustav Fröhlich, Rudi Godden. Jugo plays a stewardess working for Lufthansa. It was shot at the Johannisthal Studios in Berlin with sets designed by the art directors Karl Weber and Erich Zander. It was filmed partly on location around Genoa in Italy.

== Plot ==
During a stopover in Zurich, the stewardess Erika Berghoff spends some time with the passenger Dr. Bordam. She already liked him on the flight, but now she has fallen in love with him. What she doesn't know is that Bordam is actually a prince traveling anonymously and is already engaged to Princess Irina. However, when he learns later in the story that Erika is ill, he drops everything to visit her immediately. She feels better in his presence and both spend a wonderful, harmonious time in Italy, with their love really blossoming.

However, when Erika finds out who Bordum really is and that he is already engaged, she drops all thoughts of him and wants nothing to do with him anymore. However, he has also fallen in love with Erika and is now leaving his past behind in order to spend the future together with Erika.

== Cast ==
- Jenny Jugo as Erika Berghoff, Stewardeß
- Gustav Fröhlich as Prinz Louis Alexander alias Dr. Alexander Bordam
- Rudi Godden as Der Bordfunker
- Maria Koppenhöfer as Die Königinmutter
- Aribert Wäscher as Ein Gast im Café
- Kurt Seifert as Heinrod
- Gertrud de Lalsky as Frau Berghoff, Erikas Mutter
- Flockina von Platen as Dr. Bordams französische Freundin
- Walter Steinbeck as Der Ministerpräsident
- Walter Werner as Erikas Vater
- Elisabeth Eygk as Prinzessin Irina
- Günther Hadank as Der König
- Hans Kettler as Erster Pilot der Fluglinie
- Hans Meyer-Hanno as Pilot
- Georg H. Schnell as Der amerikanische Flugpassagier
- Alfred Heynisch as Flugpassagier
- Hans Schneider as Der Co-Pilot
- Walter Schenk as Ein italienischer Flugpassagier
- Klaus Pohl as Ein besorgter Flugpassagier
- Walter Lieck as Peter Siebert, der blinde Flugpassagier
- Albert Ihle as Flugpassagier
- Michele Danton as Der italienische Kellner im Gartenrestaurant
- Alfred Karen as Der Pokalüberreicher
- Annemarie Steinsieck as Begleiterin
- Herbert Weissbach as Der 'Kenner' am Billardtisch
- Max Mothes as Der Hotelportier in Zürich
- Gustav Püttjer as Ein Flugmechaniker
- Jac Diehl as Ein Bildreporter
- Hans Leibelt
- Gustav Waldau
- Erika von Thellmann
