= Melody of Love (1932 film) =

1932 film

- Film poster
- German: Melodie der Liebe
- Directed by: Georg Jacoby
- Written by: Fritz Friedmann-Frederich; Fred Hildenbrand; Hermann Müller
- Produced by: Hermann Rosenfeld; Ludwig Scheer; Helmut Schreiber
- Starring: Richard Tauber; Petra Unkel; S. Z. Sakall; Lien Deyers
- Cinematography: Friedl Behn-Grund; Georg Bruckbauer
- Edited by: Alwin Elling
- Music by: Bronislau Kaper
- Production company: Reichsliga-Film
- Distributed by: Heros-Film
- Release date: 24 April 1932
- Running time: 105 minutes
- Country: Germany
- Language: German

Melody of Love (German: Melodie der Liebe) is a 1932 German operetta film directed by Georg Jacoby and starring Richard Tauber, Petra Unkel and S.Z. Sakall. It was shot at the Johannisthal Studios in Berlin with sets designed by the art director Max Heilbronner. It premiered on 24 April 1932. It is also known in English by the alternative title Right to Happiness.

== Cast ==
- Richard Tauber as R. Hoffmann, chamber singer
- Petra Unkel as Gloria Hoffmann
- S. Z. Sakall as Bernhard
- Lien Deyers as Escha
- Alice Treff as Lilli
- Grete Natzler as Hella
- Anton Walbrook as bandmaster
- Karl Etlinger as Lilli's father
- Ida Wüst as Lilli's mother
- Miss Berley as nurse
- Angelo Ferrari as Lilli's friend
- Die Parkers as four bar singers
- Greta Keller as singer

== Bibliography ==
- Klaus, Ulrich J. Deutsche Tonfilme: Jahrgang 1932. Klaus-Archiv, 1988.
