= Klaus Pohl (actor) =

Austrian actor (1883–1958)

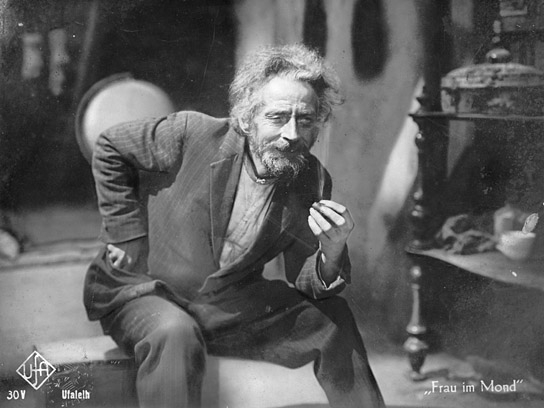
- Born: 1 November 1883; Vienna, Austria-Hungary
- Died: 28 November 1958 (aged 75); Garsten, Austria
- Occupation: Film actor
- Years active: 1908–1955

Klaus Pohl (1 November 1883 – 28 November 1958) was an Austrian stage and film actor.

== Selected filmography ==
- Hannele's Journey to Heaven (1922)
- Spione (1928) - Burton Jason's Assistant (uncredited)
- Under Suspicion (1928) - Otto
- Woman in the Moon (1929) - Professor Georg Manfeldt
- A Student's Song of Heidelberg (1930)
- A Thousand Words of German (1930) - Friseurgehilfe
- The Emperor's Sweetheart (1931) - Friseur
- Die Faschingsfee (1931) - Pappritz
- The Wrong Husband (1931)
- M (1931) - Witness / One-Eyed Man (uncredited)
- The Squeaker (1931) - Ein Spieler
- A Mad Idea (1932) - Schneider
- The First Right of the Child (1932)
- The White Demon (1932) - Theaterdiener
- Sacred Waters (1932)
- Das Abenteuer der Thea Roland (1932)
- The Testament of Dr. Mabuse (1933) - Müller
- Die Fahrt ins Grüne (1933) - Ein Agent
- Johannisnacht (1933) - Regisseur
- Du sollst nicht begehren... (1933) - Der Händler-Thomas
- Elisabeth and the Fool (1934) - Clown August
- Hanneles Himmelfahrt (1934) - Schneider
- Music in the Blood (1934)
- Master of the World (1934) - Stöppke, Bergmann
- The Young Baron Neuhaus (1934)
- Herr Kobin geht auf Abenteuer (1934)
- La Paloma. Ein Lied der Kameradschaft (1934)
- I Marry My Wife (1934)
- The Eternal Dream (1934) - Balmats Vater
- Die Liebe und die erste Eisenbahn (1934)
- Ein Kind, ein Hund, ein Vagabund (1934)
- Love, Death and the Devil (1934)
- Die törichte Jungfrau (1935)
- The Gypsy Baron (1935)
- Rêve éternel (1935) - Le père de Balmat
- Make Me Happy (1935) - Kameramann
- Stradivárius (1935)
- Lessons in Love (1935)
- Liebesleute (1935) - Der alte Raschke
- Artist Love (1935) - Ballettmeister
- The Girl from the Marsh Croft (1935) - Schöffe
- Königstiger (1935)
- Der Ammenkönig (1935)
- Black Roses (1935) - Polizeiagent
- The Merry Wives (1936) - Wächter am Stadttor u. Nachtwächter
- Der schüchterne Casanova (1936)
- Family Parade (1936) - Graf Donnerschlag auf Riesenfels
- Boccaccio (1936) - Empörter Bürger Ferraras
- Uncle Bräsig (1936) - Nachtwächter
- Ninety Minute Stopover (1936) - Ein Sekretär
- Geheimnis eines alten Hauses (1936)
- Die Leute mit dem Sonnenstich (1936) - Kröglmayer - Gefängniswärter in Diggenberg
- Thunder, Lightning and Sunshine (1936)
- Vier Mädel und ein Mann (1936)
- The Hound of the Baskervilles (1937) - Notar
- A Girl from the Chorus (1937) - Inspizient
- Togger (1937) - Der Vormann der Druckereisetzer
- Madame Bovary (1937) - Gerichtsbeamter
- Such Great Foolishness (1937)
- Meiseken (1937) - Hämmerleins Abteilungsdirektor
- To New Shores (1937) - Puritaner
- Heimweh (1937) - Ein kranker illegaler Einwanderer
- The Irresistible Man (1937) - Reporter
- Diamonds (1937) - Inspizient
- An Enemy of the People (1937) - Teilnehmer bei der Versammlung Dr. Stockmanns
- Der Lachdoktor (1937)
- Strong Hearts in the Storm (1937)
- An Enemy of the People (1937)
- Urlaub auf Ehrenwort (1938) - Ein Artist in der Pension (uncredited)
- The Indian Tomb (1938) - Inder, der beim Fest nach den Gewehren fragt
- Die Umwege des schönen Karl (1938)
- The Stars Shine (1938)
- The Secret Lie (1938) - Bildberichterstatter
- Grossalarm (1938)
- Frühlingsluft (1938)
- The Impossible Mister Pitt (1938) - Parker, Matrose
- The Great and the Little Love (1938) - Ein besorgter Flugpassagier
- Skandal um den Hahn (1938)
- Fortsetzung folgt (1938) - Tetrazzini
- Zwei Frauen (1938)
- Nanon (1938)
- Men Are That Way (1939) - Karusselbesitzer
- Stars of Variety (1939) - Varietéarzt
- The Governor (1939) - Mann am Bahnhof, der sich eine Zigarette anzündet
- Die Geliebte (1939) - Taxifahrer
- Renate in the Quartet (1939)
- Robert Koch (1939) - Wissenschaftler im Pathologischen Institu
- Die fremde Frau (1939)
- Madame Butterfly (1939) - Der Schwerhörige
- Roman eines Arztes (1939)
- Twelve Minutes After Midnight (1939) - Gauner Collin
- Kennwort Machin (1939) - Schreibstengel
- Alarm at Station III (1939) - Lagerverwalter der Allgemeinen Brennstoff A.G. (uncredited)
- Shoulder Arms (1939)
- Maria Ilona (1939) - Sternengucker
- We Danced Around the World (1939) - Agent in Kopenhagen
- Rote Mühle (1940)
- Angelika (1940)
- Weißer Flieder (1940) - Dr. Jensen, Arzt
- The Fire Devil (1940) - Kranewitter, Kärntner Bauer
- Tip auf Amalia (1940)
- The Girl at the Reception (1940)
- Meine Tochter tut das nicht (1940)
- Die Rothschilds (1940) - (uncredited)
- The Three Codonas (1940) - Gnomenhaftes Männchen
- Achtung! Feind hört mit! (1940) - Buchhändler
- Kleider machen Leute (1940)
- Die lustigen Vagabunden (1940)
- Der Herr im Haus (1940) - Granseder
- Ritorno (1940)
- Traummusik (1940)
- The Girl from Barnhelm (1940)
- Counterfeiters (1940) - Straßenzeitungsverkäufer
- Kora Terry (1940) - Konzertbesucher
- Bismarck (1940) - (uncredited)
- Operetta (1940)
- Small Town Poet (1940) - Vorstand der Friseurinnung von Schönbach
- Frieder und Catherlieschen (1940)
- Blutsbrüderschaft (1941) - Zeitungshändler
- Am Abend auf der Heide (1941)
- Mistress Moon (1941) - Mann im Apollo-Theater
- Riding for Germany (1941) - Gerichtsvollzieher
- Goodbye, Franziska (1941) - Briefträger Pröckl
- Clarissa (1941) - Bankbuchhalter Huhn
- Sechs Tage Heimaturlaub (1941)
- Leichte Muse (1941)
- Das tapfere Schneiderlein (1941) - Finanzrat
- Der Meineidbauer (1941)
- Tanz mit dem Kaiser (1941)
- Wenn du noch eine Heimat hast (1942) - Fährmann
- Viel Lärm um Nixi (1942)
- Sky Hounds (1942) - Lagerkoch
- Anuschka (1942)
- Die heimlichen Bräute (1942) - Kanzleisekretär Böckl
- Vom Schicksal verweht (1942)
- Andreas Schlüter (1942) - Ein Kommissionsmitglied
- We Make Music (1942) - Bühnenportier in der Oper
- With the Eyes of a Woman (1942) - Theaterinspizient
- Beloved World (1942) - Bürovorsteher Dohle
- Diesel (1942) - Büroangestellter bei Buz (uncredited)
- A Waltz with You (1943) - Der Sekretär im Furioso-Verlag
- Paracelsus (1943)
- Kohlhiesel's Daughters (1943) - Gemeindediener Paulus
- Carnival of Love (1943) - Gardrobier Wichmann
- Liebe, Leidenschaft und Leid (1943)
- An Old Heart Becomes Young Again (1943) - Süsswarenverkaüfer am Bahnhof (uncredited)
- Laugh Bajazzo (1943) - Mäzen
- Romance in a Minor Key (1943) - Pawnbroker
- Circus Renz (1943) - Stefan - Bärenführer (uncredited)
- Fritze Bollmann wollte angeln (1943) - Lehrer Bockelmann
- Journey into the Past (1943) - Portier im Konservatorium
- The Golden Spider (1943) - Der Balettmeister der "Roten Mühle"
- Um neun kommt Harald (1944)
- Love Letters (1944)
- Ein schöner Tag (1944)
- Musik in Salzburg (1944)
- Aufruhr der Herzen (1944) - Krösbacher
- That Was My Life (1944) - Schaffner
- Das Hochzeitshotel (1944)
- Spiel mit der Liebe (1944)
- Moselfahrt mit Monika (1944)
- Melusine (1944)
- Der Mann, dem man den Namen stahl (1944) - Der Portier in Stundenhotel
- Via Mala (1945) - Gast bei Bündner
- Am Abend nach der Oper (1945) - Portier
- Under the Bridges (1946) - Museum Employee
- Die Kreuzlschreiber (1950) - Fuhrwerkknecht (uncredited)
- Herzen im Sturm (1951) - Fischer Karsch
- The White Horse Inn (1952) - Bettler Loidl
- The Immortal Vagabond (1953)
- The Sinful Village (1954) - Gemeindediener (uncredited)
- Fireworks (1954) - Piepereit (uncredited)
- The Song of Kaprun (1955)
- 08/15 – Part 2 (1955) - Winziger
- The Major and the Bulls (1955) - Stockbauer (final film role)

== Bibliography ==
- Eisner, Lotte H. The Haunted Screen: Expressionism in the German Cinema and the Influence of Max Reinhardt. University of California Press, 2008.
