= The Golden Mask (1939 film) =

1939 film

- Directed by: Hans H. Zerlett
- Written by: Hans H. Zerlett
- Produced by: Helmut Schreiber
- Starring: Albert Matterstock; Hilde Weissner; Rudi Godden
- Cinematography: Friedl Behn-Grund
- Edited by: Ella Ensink
- Music by: Leo Leux
- Production company: Euphono-Film
- Distributed by: Tobis Film
- Release date: 15 September 1939
- Running time: 80 minutes
- Country: Germany
- Language: German

The Golden Mask (German: Die goldene Maske) is a 1939 German drama film directed by Hans H. Zerlett and starring Albert Matterstock, Hilde Weissner and Rudi Godden. It was shot at the Johannisthal Studios in Berlin. The film's sets were designed by the art directors Karl Machus and Erich Zander. It premiered at the Gloria-Palast in Berlin.

== Cast ==
- Albert Matterstock as Alexander van Erl
- Hilde Weissner as Maria Berteen
- Rudi Godden as Paul Popp
- Karl Schönböck as Sepp Kramer
- Fritz Kampers as Robert Berteen
- Werner Schott as Professor Torner
- Edith Oß as Kathrin
- Hans Wallner as Richard, Diener
- Fita Benkhoff as Nora
- Rudolf Schündler as Olden
- Else Ward as Lady
- Hansjoachim Büttner as Bergfeldt
- Eva Tinschmann as Frau Wendig
- Vera Complojer as Frau Ringlhuber
- Eduard von Winterstein as Alter Herr
- Olga Limburg as Frau Jelnik
- Friedrich Beug as Diener bei Berteen
- Erna Nitter as Krankenschwester

== Bibliography ==
- Klaus, Ulrich J. Deutsche Tonfilme: Jahrgang 1939. Klaus-Archiv, 1988.
