= Kalanag (magician) =

German film producer and magician (1903–1963)

Helmut Schreiber
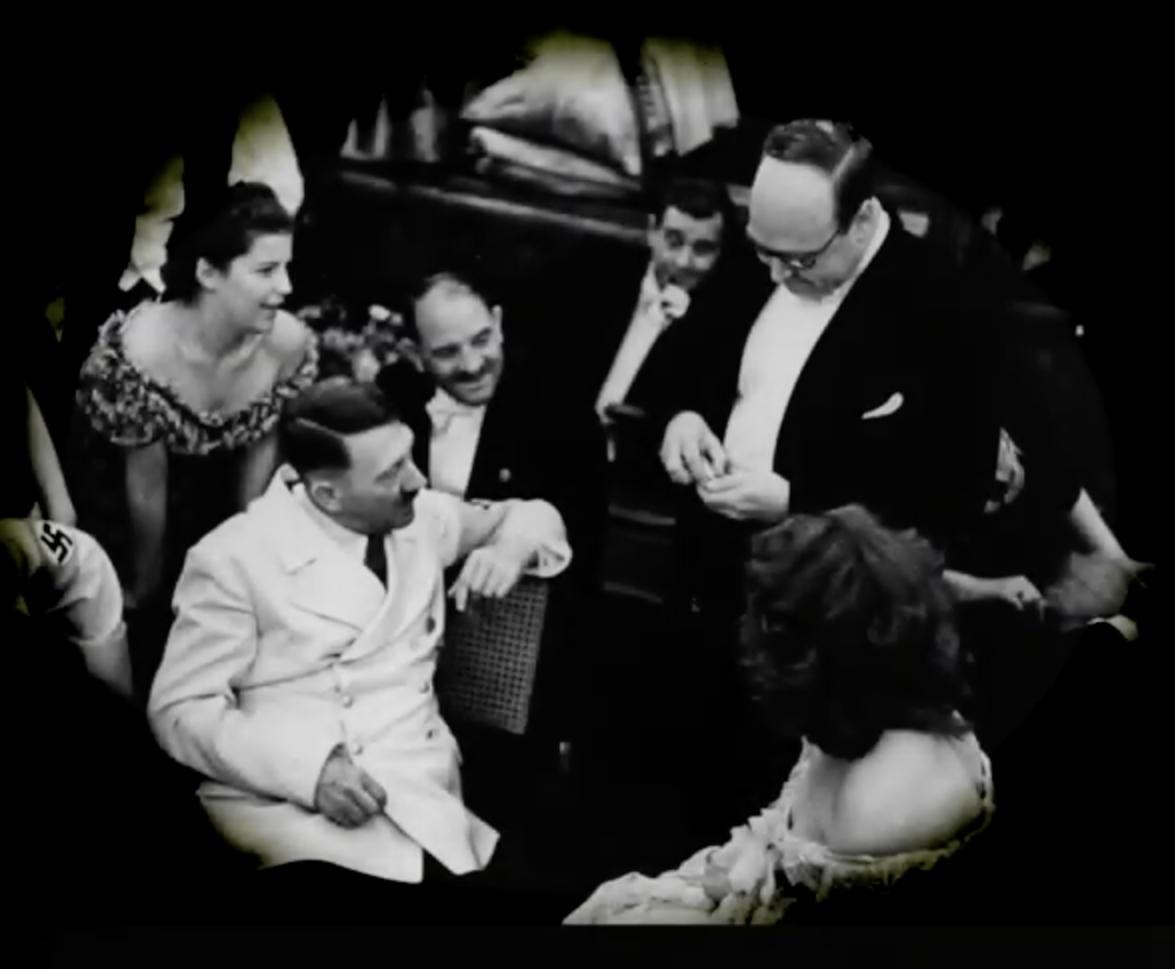
- On the right with Adolf Hitler, 1939
- Born: 23 January 1903; Stuttgart, German Empire
- Died: 24 December 1963 (aged 60); Gaildorf, West Germany
- Occupations: Film producer, magician
- Years active: 1924–1945 (film)

Kalanag, born Helmut Ewald Schreiber, (23 January 1903, in Backnang – 24 December 1963, in Gaildorf) was a German film producer and magician in the German Reich and in the early Federal Republic of Germany. He was known as the "court magician of the Nazis".

== Life ==
=== Early years ===
Schreiber was born the second son of the factory owner and cloth merchant Wilhelm Schreiber and his wife Martha née Leuze who was the daughter of a well to do merchant family from Passau.

Schreiber became interested in magic at an early age in 1911 after he suffered an ear infection which required surgery. To cheer up the bedridden boy his uncle brought him "Das Goldene Buch der Magie" (The Golden Book of Magic) by H. F. C. Suhr. Suhr being one of the founding members of the Magische Zirkel von Deutschland (Magic Circle of Germany)

After this Schreiber devoted himself intensively to the art of magic and entered the Magic Circle of Germany at the age of 16. His father did not like his sons interest in magic and at one time burned the box in which Schreiber kept his magic paraphernalia, but eventually they relented and supported his hobby as long as he promised to graduate which would enable him to eventually attend higher education.

He attended the Rosenberg-Realschule in Stuttgart and later studied at LMU Munich and at the Technical University of Munich. Schreibers father wished that he would become a doctor but instead in 1921 he enrolled in philosophy classes.

During his studies of philosophy in Munich, he organized one of the first German magic congresses. At the same time he gained experience as an actor and dramaturg at the Münchner Kammerspiele. From 1925 he worked in the film industry in Berlin. As a production manager, starting in 1926 he was in the silent films Hunt on People (1926), The Man Without a Head (1927), One Against All (1927), The Duty to be Silent (1927), Evidence (1928), The Winner (1928), Marriage in Need (1929), Motherly Love (1929), The Mistress and her Servant (1929) and Innocence (1929).

In 1927 he became editor-in-chief of MAGIE magazine of the Magic Circle. He chose his stage name after the elephant Kala Nag ("Black Snake") from Rudyard Kipling's The Jungle Book.

=== Time of National Socialism ===
Due to his good contacts to Propaganda Minister Joseph Goebbels he made his career at the Tobis Film Company. With the onset of the sound film era Schreiber rose to production manager, from 1930 to 1934 he was also active as a motorcycle racer. From summer 1936 he worked as a production group leader, in 1939 he became an executive of the film industry. Around this time he also helped produce the film "Robert and Bertram" the only anti-semitic musical comedy released during the Nazi regime.

in June 1942 he finally became production manager in Bavaria and remained there until the end of the war. As author, cameraman, recording and production manager, Schreiber was responsible for a total of 150 films. Schreiber, who belonged to the NSDAP since 1933, prevented the dissolution of the Magic Circle, which, however, from June 1936 as part of the so-called Gleichschaltung forced to the Reich Chamber of Culture (Reichstheater chamber, section Artistics) affiliated. Schreiber got involved with the National Socialists as president of the Magic Circle (1936–1945), membership was reduced from the originally 1373 members to 400 and prevented the use of Jewish compositions as background music. Without belonging to the circle controlled by Schreiber, magicians in Germany were banned from performing which inevitably affected Jewish magicians. In contrast, after the war, Jewish artists defended Kalanag and pointed out that he still kept Jewish personnel in the service of Bavaria for a long time. In 1936 Schreiber was awarded the Hofzinser Ring, which he passed on to Ludwig Hanemann (stage name Punx) in 1948.

After the Anschluss of Austria, Schreiber extended his influence to there. Schreiber became director of the Bavaria Film in Munich, produced public speeches by Adolf Hitler and in 1939 was a guest at the Berghof am Obersalzberg. Schreiber fostered friendship with Hitler's personal adjutant, SS Gruppenführer Julius Schaub, who sponsored magical events. This would later lead to the magicians controversy.

Magicians and illusionists were accepted by the Nazi regime as long as they followed the regulations and the expression was for entertainment rather than an active belief in the occult . But the definitions were not very clear and led to some difficulties as the Nazi authorities both tried to debunk magic but at the same time permitted it. Schreiber as the president of the Magic Circle complained in a letter to the authorities that the debunkers (Police commisar Carl Pelz and Albert Stadhagen) even though state-sanctioned; was by their efforts and lectures revealing the magicians' tricks and were thus undermining the livelihood of the magicians.

Schreiber in his letter even threatened with reporting the matter to his friend Schaub and to the Gestapo. Within two weeks of the letter Pelz was ordered by the Gestapo to cease with his activities in debunking magicians. The bold attitude of Schreibers in his letter may be related to Schreiber's friendship with the Berlin police chief and occultist Wolf-Heinrich Graf von Helldorff, who had once considered the tricky imposter Erik Jan Hanussen to be a real magician.

Schreiber propagated the illusion "Simsalabim" as his creation, and said to have been inspired by the German children's song "Auf einem Baum ein Kuckuck saß" wherein the lyrics "Simsaladim" appears. But the phrase is now by historians ascribed to the Danish-American magician Dante.

Schreiber was close enough to the inner circle around Hitler to be a guest at the wedding of Eva Braun's sister Gretl to Hermann Fegelein.

Braun would also hire Schreiber and his wife Gloria to entertain Hitler and his friends for two weeks in April 1944. Schreiber would put on magic shows almost every evening in the Great Hall at the Berghof. Hitler is said to have enjoyed the performances, frequently laughing and applauding.

=== End of the war ===
Towards the end of the war, Schreiber mediated between the Allies and wanted SS men, who offered free access to the legendary stolen Nazi gold, which is officially largely lost. Later, when the military police wanted to arrest Schreiber on the Bavaria site, he appeared in the presence of high-ranking American military officers who protected him. He was deposed as president of the Magic Circle and received a professional ban from the Allies. After a denazification process, Schreiber fled to the British occupation zone to Hamburg, where he lived with a magic friend who was known as the "king of the black market" and was later convicted of diamond smuggling with a Swiss magician.

=== Postwar career ===
Since Schreiber had a professional ban on his previous profession, he turned his hobby into a profession in 1947 – at a time when the postwar period was turning into a postwar boom or economic miracle. With the support of former Tobis people, he entertained British occupation soldiers with his Kalanag revue, consisting of elaborate illusions and lightly dressed showgirls.

The most famous numbers included, among others, the Magic Bar dating back to Jean Eugène Robert-Houdin and made famous by David Devant, where throughout the show out of a single pitcher different drinks were served on demand, as well as after special tricks saying "And we'll do it all with water from India" he poured a spurt of water out of a never-ending carafe onto the stage. As the highlight of each performance, he had a car disappear from the brightly lit stage following an idea by Howard Thurston. An important element of his shows was always his wife and partner Gloria de Vos (Anneliese Voss). As his assistant, with the degree of sex appeal allowed for the time, she gave each performance a special shine. Exoticism was also provided by a cheetah appearing in a box.

Officially it was never known how Schreiber had financed the elaborate show in post-war Germany from scratch. Alone the costs for the disappearing car amounted to the then extraordinary sum of 10.000, – DM. Magicians like Janos Bartl or Fredo Marvelli, whom Schreiber had badly harmed during the time of national socialism, called for the boycott of his shows.

=== World tours ===
In the 1950s, Kalanag toured with his 50-member ensemble tours of Britain, Sweden, Denmark, Spain, South Africa, Brazil, the United States, Turkey and Switzerland. In the summer of 1960 he appeared in the Zwickau Groß-Variete Lindenhof. At that time, Kalanag was the only major illusionist in the world who still toured with such an elaborate show. The magic historian Richard Hatch points out that the traveled countries strikingly match the banknotes that had disappeared in 1945 with the Nazi gold. Supposedly, the CIA has therefore observed Kalanags activities throughout his life. Before and after Kalanag, no other German magician has ever taken the economic risk of such costly world tours. At the end of the 1950s interest in variety shows diminished, which also brought Schreiber into financial difficulties.

=== Germany television GmbH ===
Schreiber became entertainment director in the commercial Free Television Society. The company served the construction of the Germany-Fernsehen GmbH planned by Adenauer, which should have offered a conservative alternative to the broadcasters of the ARD. However, the project failed due to the 1st Broadcasting Judgment of the Federal Constitutional Court.

=== The later years ===
Although Kalanag had achieved a high profile and status, he could not build on his success with a slimmed down version of his revue. In the mid-1950s, Schreiber moved from Hamburg to the Württemberg village of Fornsbach, where his cousin Margarete Sedlmayer owned land and ran a café. Here he built a bungalow with a show stage ("Kalanag Studio"). On 23 January 1963, he celebrated his 60th birthday, but on Christmas Eve 1963 he died of probable heart failure in the Gaildorfer Hospital. According to his daughter Brigitte Löser, "he lived very unhealthily and was very overweight". He left his divorced wife Gloria, a fortune of 500,000 DM. She sought throughout her life a larger treasury from the Nazi gold, which she assumed that Schreiber hid somewhere.

== Personal life ==
Schreiber married his first wife Gloria (née Anneliese Vos) in 1942 and the couple had a daughter in 1943; Brigitte. They divorced in 1960.

Schreiber remarried to another woman and had a daughter also named Brigitte.

== In popular culture ==
In 2021 German news magazine Der Spiegel published a story, titled ""Hokuspokus" and Heil Hitler".

The documentary "Kalanag - Der Magier und der Teufel" (Hitler's magician) was produced in 2022.

In Spring 2025, the Staatsoperette Dresden announced the world premiere of a new musical theatre Simsalabim – Das magische Leben des Dr. Schreiber, about the life of Kalanag, with composition by Elena Kats-Chernin, book by Dirk Laucke and lyrics by Martin G. Berger.

== Selected filmography ==
- Alraune (1928)
- After the Verdict (1929)
- Cyanide (1930)
- The Emperor's Sweetheart (1931)
- Melody of Love (1932)
- Girls of Today (1933)
- Stradivari (1935)
- Signal in the Night (1937)
- Two Women (1938)
- The Great and the Little Love (1938)
- People Who Travel (1938)
- Adventure in Love (1938)
- The Stars Shine (1938)
- The Fourth Is Not Coming (1939)
- The Golden Mask (1939)
- Robert and Bertram (1939)
