= Two Women (1938 film) =

1938 film

- Directed by: Hans H. Zerlett
- Written by: Klaus S. Richter; Hans H. Zerlett
- Produced by: Helmut Schreiber
- Starring: Olga Tschechowa; Irene von Meyendorff; Paul Klinger.
- Cinematography: Georg Krause
- Edited by: Ella Ensink
- Music by: Peter Igelhoff; Leo Leux
- Production company: Tobis Film
- Distributed by: Tobis Film
- Release date: 24 October 1938
- Running time: 82 minutes
- Country: Germany
- Language: German

Two Women (German: Zwei Frauen) is a 1938 German drama film directed by Hans H. Zerlett and starring Olga Tschechowa, Irene von Meyendorff and Paul Klinger. It was shot at the Johannisthal Studios in Berlin. The film's sets were designed by the art directors Karl Weber and Erich Zander.

== Synopsis ==
The celebrated actress Paula Corvey is in love with a relationship with a younger man, the racing car driver Wener Bruck. When her eighteen-year-old daughter Eva returns to live with her after staying with her divorced father, Eva is worried it will emphasise the age gap between them and introduces her as her cousin. However, as she witnesses the growing bond between the two, she is compelled to ultimately give him up.

== Cast ==
- Olga Tschechowa as Paula Corvey
- Irene von Meyendorff as Eva von Barkow
- Paul Klinger as Werner Bruck
- Roma Bahn as Fräulein Bogner
- Walter Janssen as Professor Alexander Corvey
- Walter Steinbeck as Dr. Anatol Greyffenberg
- Arthur Schröder as Groot
- Toni Bukowicz as Souffleuse
- Lucie Polzin as Schauspielerin
- Anny Trautner as Paulas Garderobiere
- Else Ward as Frau Greyffenberg
- Erwin Biegel as Schauspieler
- Rudolf Blümner as Arzt auf der Unfallstation
- Eduard Bornträger as Sekretär des Intendanten
- Peter Elsholtz as Autorennfahrer

== Bibliography ==
- Heins, Laura. Nazi Film Melodrama. University of Illinois Press, 2013.
- Romani, Cinzia. Tainted Goddesses : Female Film Stars of the Third Reich. Da Capo Press, 1992.
