= Adventure in Love =

1938 film

- Directed by: Hans H. Zerlett
- Written by: Hans H. Zerlett
- Based on: Adventure in Love by Hans Adler
- Produced by: Helmut Schreiber
- Starring: Olga Tschechowa; Paul Klinger; Georg Alexander
- Cinematography: Georg Krause
- Edited by: Ella Ensink
- Music by: Leo Leux
- Production company: Tobis Film
- Distributed by: Tobis Film
- Release date: 23 December 1938
- Running time: 85 minutes
- Country: Germany
- Language: German

Adventure in Love (German: Verliebtes Abenteuer) is a 1938 German romantic comedy film directed by Hans H. Zerlett and starring Olga Tschechowa, Paul Klinger and Georg Alexander. The film is based on the play of the same title by Hans Adler. It was shot at the Johannisthal Studios in Berlin and on location in Nice and Paris. The film's sets were designed by the art directors Karl Weber and Erich Zander.

== Synopsis ==
The persistent Tom follows the elegant Olivia from Paris to the French Riviera. While initially rejecting his advances she eventually warms to his charm. Their developing romance is thrown into doubt when a bracelet vanishes, leading Olivia to suspect that her suitor is actually a notorious jewel thief. To prove his innocence and win her back, Tom encounters a series of comedic misunderstandings across the Mediterranean coast as he attempts to unmask the real culprit.

== Cast ==
- Olga Tschechowa as Olivia
- Paul Klinger as Tom
- Georg Alexander as Maréchal
- Erika von Thellmann as Therese
- Heinz Schorlemmer as Smuggy
- Olga Limburg as Mrs. Dolly Mérival
- Eva Tinschmann as Mme Bourdin
- Hans Junkermann as Innenminister
- Friedrich Beug as Geschäftsführer des Hotels Nizza
- Erwin Biegel as Diener
- Egon Brosig as Kartenkünstler
- Gerhard Dammann as Polizeibeamter
- Jac Diehl as Reisender im Zug nach Nizza
- Fritz Draeger as Tänzer
- Peter Elsholtz as Girolais, Kriminalkommissar
- Erich Fiedler as Barmann
- Herbert Gernot as Assistent des Polizeipräsidenten
- Walter Gross as Kellner
- Otto F. Henning as Kapitän der Yacht
- Melitta Klefer as Susanne Chavier
- Gustl Kreusch as Verkäuferin
- Franz Lichtenauer as Polizeichef
- Eberhard Mack as Junger Mann mit Monokel
- Gerti Ober as Mädchen bei Olivia
- Lucie Polzin as Blumenüberbringerin
- Rudolf Schündler as Sekretär des Polizeipräsidenten
- Rudi Schuricke as Singer
- Egon Stief as Polizist
- Miriam Verne as Solotänzerin
- Eugen von Bongardt as Kommissar Laboule
- Arthur von Doissy as Ober
- Hans Wallner as Diener des Innenministers

== Bibliography ==
- Klaus, Ulrich J. Deutsche Tonfilme: Jahrgang 1938. Klaus-Archiv, 1988.
- Romani, Cinzia. Tainted Goddesses : Female Film Stars of the Third Reich. Da Capo Press, 1992.
