= Friedl Behn-Grund =

German cinematographer

Friedl Behn-Grund (26 August 1906 – 2 August 1989) was a German cinematographer.

Shortly before the end of the Second World War he lost a leg to shellfire, but within a few months he returned to work to shoot Wolfgang Staudte's The Murderers Are Among Us (1946), the first German post-war feature film, produced by DEFA. From 1950 he worked as a freelance cinematographer in West Germany, where his credits included Kurt Hoffmann's Confessions of Felix Krull (1957).

== Selected filmography ==
- The Stolen Professor (1924)
- Struggle for the Soil (1925)
- The Man in the Fire (1926)
- My Friend the Chauffeur (1926)
- Department Store Princess (1926)
- Regine (1927)
- Aftermath (1927)
- The Woman with the World Record (1927)
- Docks of Hamburg (1928)
- Under Suspicion (1928)
- The Blue Mouse (1928)
- The Story of a Little Parisian (1928)
- Sajenko the Soviet (1928)
- Ship in Distress (1929)
- Beyond the Street (1929)
- Marriage in Trouble (1929)
- Scandal in Baden-Baden (1929)
- The Mistress and her Servant (1929)
- The Smuggler's Bride of Mallorca (1929)
- Dreyfus (1930)
- The Tender Relatives (1930)
- The Jumping Jack (1930)
- The Widow's Ball (1930)
- Retreat on the Rhine (1930)
- 24 Hours in the Life of a Woman (1931)
- The Darling of Paris (1931)
- Salto Mortale (1931)
- Everyone Asks for Erika (1931)
- Louise, Queen of Prussia (1931)
- Melody of Love (1932)
- The Pride of Company Three (1932)
- The Dancer of Sanssouci (1932)
- I by Day, You by Night (1932)
- Eight Girls in a Boat (1932)
- Peter Voss, Thief of Millions (1932)
- Early to Bed (1933)
- The Empress and I (1933)
- Goodbye, Beautiful Days (1933)
- Happy Days in Aranjuez (1933)
- The Only Girl (1933)
- Young Dessau's Great Love (1933)
- My Heart Calls You (1934)
- Police Report (1934)
- The Young Baron Neuhaus (1934)
- Night in May (1934)
- Music in the Blood (1934)
- I Love All the Women (1935)
- Donogoo Tonka (1936)
- Donogoo (1936)
- A Wedding Dream (1936)
- Truxa (1937)
- The Divine Jetta (1937)
- Alarm in Peking (1937)
- His Best Friend (1937)
- Don't Promise Me Anything (1937)
- Napoleon Is to Blame for Everything (1938)
- I Love You (1938)
- The Day After the Divorce (1938)
- The Great and the Little Love (1938)
- Robert and Bertram (1939)
- The Golden Mask (1939)
- Wibbel the Tailor (1939)
- New Year's Eve on Alexanderplatz (1939)
- The Three Codonas (1940)
- The Night in Venice (1942)
- Titanic (1943)
- Philharmonic (1944)
- The Years Pass (1945)
- The Murderers Are Among Us (1946)
- Raid (1947)
- The Beaverskin (1949)
- Encounter with Werther (1949)
- Nights on the Nile (1949)
- Scandal at the Embassy (1950)
- Desire (1951)
- A Tale of Five Cities (1951)
- Veronika the Maid (1951)
- Maria Theresa (1951)
- One Night's Intoxication (1951)
- Carnival in White (1952)
- The Great Temptation (1952)
- The Forester's Daughter (1952)
- Alraune (1952)
- Captain Bay-Bay (1953)
- The Last Waltz (1953)
- To Be Without Worries (1953)
- The Angel with the Flaming Sword (1954)
- Reaching for the Stars (1955)
- Beloved Enemy (1955)
- Before God and Man (1955)
- Heaven Is Never Booked Up (1955)
- Night of Decision (1956)
- Without You All Is Darkness (1956)
- The Glass Tower (1957)
- The Count of Luxemburg (1957)
- The Simple Girl (1957)
- The Night of the Storm (1957)
- Confessions of Felix Krull (1957)
- Stresemann (1957)
- Restless Night (1958)
- Night Nurse Ingeborg (1958)
- The Man Who Sold Himself (1959)
- The Buddenbrooks (1959)
- Storm in a Water Glass (1960)
- The Ambassador (1960)
- Blind Justice (1961)
- It Can't Always Be Caviar (1961)
- This Time It Must Be Caviar (1961)
- The Constant Wife (1962)
- Aurora Marriage Bureau (1962)
- The Merry Widow (1962)
- Wedding Night in Paradise (1962)
- An Alibi for Death (1963)
- Schweik's Awkward Years (1964)
- Honour Among Thieves (1966)
