= Ella Ensink =

German film editor

- Born: 18 December 1897; Berlin, German Empire
- Died: 1968 (aged 70–71)
- Occupation: Editor
- Years active: 1932-1962

Ella Ensink (1897–1968) was a German film editor. She frequently worked with the Czech director Carl Lamac.

== Selected filmography ==
- The Cruel Mistress (1932)
- A Night in Paradise (1932)
- Should We Wed Them? (1932)
- The Ringer (1932)
- Scampolo (1932)
- The Love Hotel (1933)
- Madame Wants No Children (1933)
- At Blonde Kathrein's Place (1934)
- Little Dorrit (1934)
- Polish Blood (1934)
- The Switched Bride (1934)
- The Double (1934)
- Peer Gynt (1934)
- The Young Count (1935)
- I Love All the Women (1935)
- Knockout (1935)
- A Girl from the Chorus (1937)
- The Hound of the Baskervilles (1937)
- The Ways of Love Are Strange (1937)
- The Stars Shine (1938)
- Fools in the Snow (1938)
- Adventure in Love (1938)
- Revolutionary Wedding (1938)
- Two Women (1938)
- The Merciful Lie (1939)
- The Golden Mask (1939)
- Robert and Bertram (1939)
- The Vulture Wally (1940)
- My Daughter Doesn't Do That (1940)
- Battle Squadron Lützow (1941)
- Mistress Moon (1941)
- Laugh Bajazzo (1943)
- The Degenhardts (1944)
- Anna Alt (1945)
- The Song of the Rivers (1954)

== Bibliography ==
- Giesen, Rolf. Nazi Propaganda Films: A History and Filmography. McFarland, 2003.
