= Berliner Luft =

1904 song by Paul Lincke

Piano reduction (1907)

Lizzi Waldmüller sings "Berliner Luft" (1941)

"Berliner Luft" (English: "Berlin Air") is a song composed by Paul Lincke with lyrics by Heinrich Bolten-Baeckers. It was originally part of an unsuccessful two-act 1904 opera of the same title when it was called "Das ist die Berliner Luft", but became popular and widely performed on its own. In 1922 Lincke added it to an expanded version of his operetta Frau Luna. The song's popularity led to Lincke becoming associated with Berlin in the same manner Jacques Offenbach was linked with Paris.

== Bibliography ==
- Lamb, Andrew. 150 Years of Popular Musical Theatre. Yale University Press, 2000.
- Letellier, Robert Ignatius. Operetta: A Sourcebook, vol. II. Cambridge Scholars Publishing, 2015.
