= Erwin Biegel =

German actor (1896–1954)

- Born: Erwin Friedrich Richard Biegel; 25 March 1896; Berlin, German Empire
- Died: 24 May 1954 (aged 58); West Berlin, West Germany
- Occupations: Film actor Stage actor

Erwin Friedrich Richard Biegel (25 March 1896 – 24 May 1954) was a German stage and film actor who appeared in over eighty feature films in a variety of supporting roles.

== Selected filmography ==
- The Young Count (1935)
- His Late Excellency (1935)
- Dinner Is Served (1936)
- The Mysterious Mister X (1936)
- The Accusing Song (1936)
- Truxa (1937)
- The Ways of Love Are Strange (1937)
- Fremdenheim Filoda (1937)
- Gasparone (1937)
- Seven Slaps (1937)
- Fanny Elssler (1937)
- Revolutionary Wedding (1938)
- Adventure in Love (1938)
- The Stars Shine (1938)
- Anna Favetti (1938)
- The Man Who Couldn't Say No (1938)
- Two Women (1938)
- The Green Emperor (1939)
- Woman Without a Past (1939)
- Stars of Variety (1939)
- Robert and Bertram (1939)
- The Rothschilds (1940)
- Wunschkonzert (1940)
- Small Town Poet (1940)
- The Girl at the Reception (1940)
- My Friend Josephine (1942)
- Melody of a Great City (1943)
- The Master of the Estate (1943)
- Light of Heart (1943)
- I Entrust My Wife to You (1943)
- Nora (1944)
- A Beautiful Day (1944)
- Young Hearts (1944)
- The Years Pass (1945)
- Tell the Truth (1946)
- Raid (1947)
- King of Hearts (1947)
- The Court Concert (1948)
- Don't Dream, Annette (1949)
- The Orplid Mystery (1950)
- Torreani (1951)
- Dark Eyes (1951)
- When the Heath Dreams at Night (1952)
- Fritz and Friederike (1952)
- When The Village Music Plays on Sunday Nights (1953)
- The Dancing Heart (1953)
- Such a Charade (1953)
- Josef the Chaste (1953)

== Bibliography ==
- O'Brien, Mary-Elizabeth. Nazi Cinema as Enchantment: The Politics of Entertainment in the Third Reich. Camden House, 2006.
