= Love Letters (1944 film) =

1944 film

- Directed by: Hans H. Zerlett
- Written by: Karl Georg Külb; Felix Lützkendorf
- Produced by: Karl Ritter
- Starring: Käthe Haack; Hermann Thimig; Paul Hubschmid
- Cinematography: Josef Strecha
- Edited by: Margret Noell
- Music by: Leo Leux
- Production company: UFA
- Distributed by: Deutsche Filmvertriebs
- Release date: 21 January 1944
- Running time: 91 minutes
- Country: Germany
- Language: German

Love Letters (German: Liebesbriefe) is a 1944 German comedy film directed by Hans H. Zerlett and starring Käthe Haack, Hermann Thimig, and Paul Hubschmid.

The film's sets were designed by the art director Wilhelm Vorwerg.

== Cast ==
- Käthe Haack as Thea Tiedemann
- Hermann Thimig as Konrad Tiedemann
- Suse Graf as Hilde Wagner
- Paul Hubschmid as Robert Wieland
- Bruni Löbel as Inge Tiedemann
- Hans Brausewetter as Dr. Helmut Meiningen
- Charlotte Witthauer as Barbara Leffert
- Lotte Rausch as Lene
- Clemens Hasse
- Eduard Wenck
- Klaus Pohl
- Paul Rehkopf
- Vera Eckert

== Bibliography ==
- Bock, Hans-Michael; Bergfelder, Tim, eds. (2009). The Concise Cinegraph: Encyclopaedia of German Cinema. New York: Berghahn Books. ISBN 978-1-57181-655-9.
