= Leo Leux =

German composer (1893-1951)

- Born: 7 March 1893; Munich, Bavaria; German Empire
- Died: 8 September 1951 (aged 58); West Berlin; West Germany
- Other name: Gottlieb Leuchs
- Occupation: Composer
- Years active: 1930 - 1951 (film)

Leo Leux (7 March 1893 – 8 September 1951) was a German composer of film scores. He began working on films during the Weimar Republic, following the introduction of sound films. During the Nazi era, Leux worked largely on entertainment films such as Truxa (1937) as well more ideogically-oriented films such as Venus on Trial (1941). He continued to work in cinema following World War II, right up to his death in 1951.

== Selected filmography ==
- Susanne Cleans Up (1930)
- A Woman Branded (1931)
- Durand Versus Durand (1931)
- My Heart Longs for Love (1931)
- The Love Hotel (1933)
- Little Dorrit (1934)
- The Double (1934)
- The Switched Bride (1934)
- At Blonde Kathrein's Place (1934)
- The Young Count (1935)
- His Late Excellency (1935)
- Knockout (1935)
- A Doctor of Conviction (1936)
- Maria the Maid (1936)
- The Unsuspecting Angel (1936)
- The Bashful Casanova (1936)
- Truxa (1937)
- The Ways of Love Are Strange (1937)
- My Son the Minister (1937)
- The Beaver Coat (1937)
- Star of the Circus (1938)
- Adventure in Love (1938)
- Two Women (1938)
- The Golden Mask (1939)
- Robert and Bertram (1939)
- My Daughter Doesn't Do That (1940)
- Venus on Trial (1941)
- My Friend Josephine (1942)
- The Little Residence (1942)
- To Be God One Time (1942)
- Don't Talk to Me About Love (1943)
- The Dark Day (1943)
- Love Letters (1944)
- Ghost in the Castle (1947)
- In the Temple of Venus (1948)
- Torreani (1951)

== Bibliography ==
- Waldman, Harry. Nazi Films In America, 1933-1942. McFarland & Company, 2008.
