= The Song of the Rivers =

1954 film

- Directed by: Joris Ivens; Joop Huisken; Robert Menegoz
- Written by: Vladimir Pozner] Joris Ivens
- Produced by: DEFA-Studio für Wochenschau- und Dokumentarfilme for the World Federation of Trade Unions
- Starring: Paul Robeson
- Cinematography: Erich Nitzschmann; Anatoli Koloschin; Sascha Vierny; Maximilian Scheer
- Edited by: Ella Ensink
- Music by: Dmitri Shostakovich; Bertolt Brecht (lyrics)
- Release date: 1954
- Running time: 90 minutes
- Country: East Germany
- Languages: German; English; French; Dutch

The Song of the Rivers (German: Das Lied der Ströme) is a 1954 documentary film production by the East Germany film studio DEFA. Dutch filmmaker Joris Ivens was the leading director. The sprawling film celebrates international workers movements along six major rivers: the Volga, Mississippi, Ganges, Nile, Amazon and the Yangtze. Shot in many countries by different film crews, and later edited by Ivens, Song of the Rivers begins with a lyrical montage of landscapes and laborers and proceeds to glorify labor and modern industrial machinery. The musical score is by Dmitri Shostakovich, with lyrics written by Bertolt Brecht, and songs performed by German communism's star Ernst Busch and famous American actor, singer and activist Paul Robeson who also narrates. Song of the Rivers is an ode to international solidarity.

== Popularity in communist countries ==
After World War II, Ivens spent several years in East Germany, where he edited Song of the Rivers, which is said to have been seen by 250 million people in communist countries. A tribute to international trade unionism, the film combines images of life along six great rivers: the Mississippi, the Ganges, the Nile, the Yangtse, the Volga, and the Amazon. Unlike the intimacy of "Power and the Land," another Ivens film, abstract grandiloquence is the keynote. The narrator Paul Robeson states: "Day by day with our hands — yellow, white, or black — we change the face of the earth and the future of mankind." Ivens’s editing gives the film a simple, cumulative force. The longing for unity expressed in Song of the Rivers is apparent throughout the documentary.
