= Erich Zander (art director) =

German art director (1889–1965)

- Born: 17 June 1889; Berlin, German Empire
- Died: 15 September 1965 (aged 76); Regenstauf, Bavaria, West Germany
- Occupation: Art director
- Years active: 1920–1964 (film )

Erich Zander (1889–1965) was a German art director.

== Selected filmography ==
- State Attorney Jordan (1926)
- Derby (1926)
- Students' Love (1927)
- Alpine Tragedy (1927)
- The Little Slave (1928)
- Mariett Dances Today (1928)
- Volga Volga (1928)
- Rooms to Let (1930)
- Oh Those Glorious Old Student Days (1930)
- I'll Stay with You (1931)
- Ariane (1931)
- A Thousand for One Night (1933)
- The Marathon Runner (1933)
- Spies at Work (1933)
- The Love Hotel (1933)
- Roses from the South (1934)
- The Double (1934)
- Little Dorrit (1934)
- Knockout (1935)
- The Blonde Carmen (1935)
- She and the Three (1935)
- The Young Count (1935)
- The Red Rider (1935)
- The Bashful Casanova (1936)
- Intermezzo (1936)
- The Merry Wives (1936)
- Doctor Engel (1936)
- Love Can Lie (1937)
- His Best Friend (1937)
- Don't Promise Me Anything (1937)
- Adventure in Love (1938)
- The Day After the Divorce (1938)
- I Love You (1938)
- Two Women (1938)
- The Golden Mask (1939)
- Robert and Bertram (1939)
- Quartet of Five (1949)
- The Blue Swords (1949)

== Bibliography ==
- Giesen, Rolf. Nazi Propaganda Films: A History and Filmography. McFarland, 2003.
