= Eva Tinschmann =

German actress

- Born: 19 April 1893; Königsberg, German Empire
- Died: 10 August 1978 (aged 85); Bavaria, West Germany
- Occupation: Actress
- Years active: 1932-1947 (film)

Eva Tinschmann (April 19, 1893 – August 10, 1978) was a German actress. She appeared in the 1937 Sherlock Holmes film The Grey Lady.

== Selected filmography ==
- A Doctor of Conviction (1936)
- The Final Chord (1936)
- The Accusing Song (1936)
- Scandal at the Fledermaus (1936)
- Truxa (1937)
- Capers (1937)
- The Divine Jetta (1937)
- His Best Friend (1937)
- The Grey Lady (1937)
- After Midnight (1938)
- The Stars Shine (1938)
- Fools in the Snow (1938)
- Adventure in Love (1938)
- Revolutionary Wedding (1938)
- Robert and Bertram (1939)
- Wibbel the Tailor (1939)
- Twelve Minutes After Midnight (1939)
- The Golden Mask (1939)
- My Aunt, Your Aunt (1939)
- The Girl at the Reception (1940)
- My Daughter Doesn't Do That (1940)
- Venus on Trial (1941)
- The Gasman (1941)
- Above All Else in the World (1941)
- His Son (1942)
- The Little Residence (1942)
- Journey into the Past (1943)
- The Second Shot (1943)
- Back Then (1943)
- Ghost in the Castle (1947)

== Bibliography ==
- Pointer, Michael. The Sherlock Holmes File. David & Charles, 1976.
