= Paul Lincke =

German composer (1866–1946)

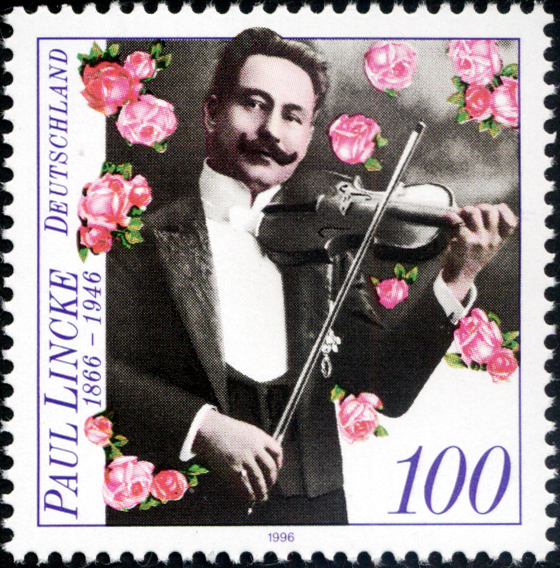
Paul Lincke on a German postage stamp, 1996

Carl Emil Paul Lincke (7 November 1866 – 3 September 1946) was a German composer and theater conductor. He is considered the "father" of the Berlin operetta. His well-known compositions include "Berliner Luft" ("Berlin Air"), the unofficial anthem of Berlin, from his operetta Frau Luna; and "The Glow-Worm", from his operetta Lysistrata.

== Early life ==
Lincke was born on 7 November 1866 in the Jungfernbrücke district of Berlin. He was the son of magistrate August Lincke and his wife Emilie. His father played the violin in several small orchestras. When Paul was only five years old his father died. Emilie moved with her three children to Adalbertstraße, and later to Eisenbahnstraße, near Lausitzer Platz.

Lincke's early musical inclinations were towards military music. His mother sent him after the completion of secondary school education to Wittenberge. Here he was trained in the Wittenberg City Band under Rudolf Kleinow as a bassoonist. He also learned to play the tenor horn, the drums, the piano and the violin.

== Career ==
=== Performance and early compositions ===
Instead of pursuing a career as a military musician, Lincke secured employment as a bassoonist at Berlin's Central Theatre, under Adolf Ernst. After one year, he joined the orchestra of the Ostend Theatre.

In entertainment and dance music Lincke gained valuable experience at the Königsstädtischen Theater, the Belle-Alliance-Theater and the Parodie-Theater. He accompanied the musical vaudeville programs and provided his own compositions for popular singers. His Venus auf Erden (Venus on Earth), a revue-like one-act play was created in 1897 at the Apollo Theater in Friedrichstraße.

=== Success with Frau Luna ===
For two years, Paul Lincke worked at the most famous European vaudeville house, the Folies Bergère in Paris. He then returned with new compositions to the Apollo-Theater where, with huge success in 1899 Frau Luna (Mrs Moon) was premiered. That same year, followed Im Reiche des Indra (In the Realm of Indra), and in 1902 the operetta Lysistrata. The librettos of these were by Heinrich Bolten-Baeckers.

In 1908 Paul Lincke became principal conductor and composer for the Metropol-Theater, whose spectacular revues were the capital's biggest attraction.

=== During the Nazi regime and World War II ===
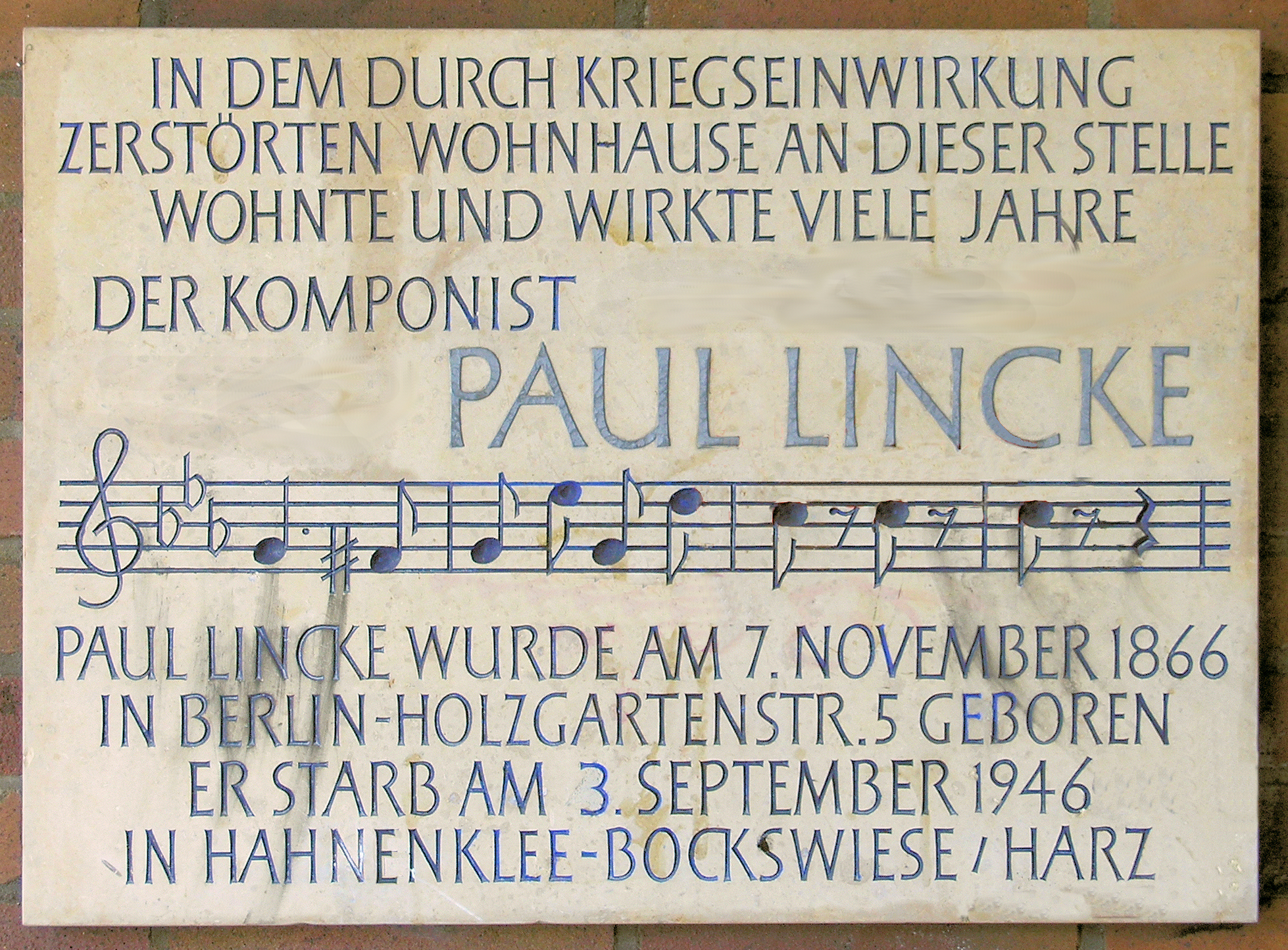
Memorial at Oranienstrasse 64, Berlin. "In the house on this site, which was destroyed as a result of war, lived and worked for many years the composer Paul Lincke. Paul Lincke was born on 7 November 1866 in Berlin at Holzgarten St. #5; he died on 3 September 1946 in Hahnenklee-Bockswiese in the Harz mountains."

With the Nazi rise to power in 1933, Lincke maintained his position and was feted by the Nazi regime. In 1937 he was awarded the Silver Medal of Honour of his native city, on his 75th birthday he was made an honorary citizen of Berlin.

His operetta Frau Luna (Mrs. Moon) was turned into a film starring Lizzi Waldmüller, Irene von Meyendorff and Georg Alexander and directed by Theo Lingen in 1941.

In 1943 Lincke toured Marienbad, Bohemia, to conduct Frau Luna, whose first performance in 1899 is now regarded as the birth of the Berlin operetta. During his absence, his house and his music publisher in Berlin were bombed.

After the war ended, Lincke wanted to return to Berlin. He strove in vain to obtain the approval of the Allies, which, as a native Berliner, he was required to have at that time. With the help of one American General Pierce, he moved first to Arzberg, Bavaria, with his housekeeper Johanna Hildebrandt, who had worked for him for 35 years.

Lincke's ailing health was worsened by the climate there, and he moved again to Hahnenklee. He died there shortly before his 80th birthday. His funeral was held in Hahnenklee, where his grave is still maintained today.

== Personal life ==
In 1885, while in the orchestra of the Grand Theatre, Lincke fell in love with the 16-year-old soubrette Anna Mueller, whom he married a year later. His wife later celebrated triumphs with the Berlin audience under the name Anna Müller-Lincke.

In 1901 Lincke divorced his first wife, Anna. That same year he met a young actress who was known under the stage name Ellen Sousa. She played in the Friedrich-Wilhelmstädtischen Theater, and enchanted Lincke from the first moment. Sousa at first rejected his advances but Lincke was persistent. Within a few weeks she had visited his home, and they developed a deeply affectionate relationship, leading to her request to be cast to sing Frau Luna at the Apollo Theater. Sousa had hoped the connection would boost her career, but it did not. She became pregnant and left the stage before giving birth to a son. Lincke now demanded that Sousa fulfil her maternal duties and leave stage work. However, three months later Sousa was again singing Frau Luna at the Apollo.

Lincke offered Ellen Sousa marriage in return for her leaving the stage. She in return demanded a cooling-off period to consider her new role as wife and mother. Lincke experienced another wave of success from Paris, leading to him spending many nights out on the social scene, leaving Sousa at home to attend to her maternal commitments. Lincke now pressured Sousa to choose between him or returning to the stage, giving her ten days to think it over while he left town to make a guest appearance. When he returned after six days, Sousa and the child had moved out.

Years later Ellen Sousa married a wholesale merchant, whom she followed to Dresden and who adopted her son without Lincke's objection. This was the end of his relationship with Ellen Sousa and his son. From those events came his well-known instrumental waltz "Verschmähte Liebe" (Spurned Love).

== Legacy ==
"Berliner Luft"
Lizzi Waldmüller, 1941

Lincke's march "Berliner Luft" ("Berlin Air") is the unofficial anthem of Berlin. It is one of the traditional encores of the Berlin Philharmonic orchestra. The aria comes from the 1922 revision of Lincke's 1899 operetta Frau Luna, about a trip to the moon in a hot air balloon, where an adventurous party of prominent Berliners meet Frau Luna and her court. The march was originally from Lincke's 1904 two-act burlesque Berliner Luft.

Other Lincke operettas include Im Reiche des Indra (In the Kingdom of Indra) and Lysistrata. The latter includes the song "Das Glühwürmchen," known in English as "The Glow-Worm". It was originally translated into English by Lilla Cayley Robinson in the early 20th century, but American lyricist Johnny Mercer later expanded and greatly revised her lyrics. His version was a hit for the Mills Brothers in 1952, and has been performed by many others.

Lincke also composed the waltz "Wedding Dance" ("Hochzeitsreigen") played in the 1997 movie Titanic; it is played while the ship is going down and in the dining room in earlier scenes.

== Selected operettas ==
- Venus auf Erden (Berlin 1897)
- Frau Luna (Berlin 1899)
- Im Reiche des Indra (Berlin 1899)
- Fräulein Loreley (Berlin 1900)
- Lysistrata (Berlin 1902)
- Nakiris Hochzeit, oder Der Stern von Siam (Berlin 1902)
- Prinzess Rosine (Berlin 1905)
- Casanova (Darmstadt 1913)
- Ein Liebestraum (Hamburg 1940)

== Sources ==
- Anton Würz (1985). "Lincke, Paul". Neue Deutsche Biographie (in German). Vol. 14. Berlin: Duncker & Humblot. pp. 572–573. (full text online).
