= Robert and Bertram (1939 film) =

1939 film

- Directed by: Hans H. Zerlett
- Written by: Hans H. Zerlett
- Based on: Robert and Bertram by Gustav Raeder
- Produced by: Helmut Schreiber
- Starring: Rudi Godden; Kurt Seifert; Carla Rust; Fritz Kampers
- Cinematography: Friedl Behn-Grund
- Edited by: Ella Ensink
- Music by: Leo Leux
- Production company: Tobis Film
- Distributed by: Tobis Film
- Release date: 7 July 1939
- Country: Germany
- Language: German

Robert and Bertram (German: Robert und Bertram) is a 1939 German musical comedy film directed by Hans H. Zerlett and starring Rudi Godden, Kurt Seifert, and Carla Rust. It premiered in Hamburg on 7 July 1939. It was based on the 1856 play Robert and Bertram by Gustav Räder about two wandering vagrants which had been adapted into several film versions including a Polish film of the same title the previous year. It was set in 1839.

It was made by Tobis Film at the company's Johannisthal Studios in Berlin. The film's sets were designed by the art directors Karl Machus and Erich Zander.

It was the only antisemitic musical comedy released during the Nazi era and the first film since Kristallnacht to focus on Jews as cultural and economic outsiders. Ironically, the film's antagonist, the Jew Nathan Ipelmeyer, is not a cultural and economic outsider, but a wealthy burgher of the city.

== Cast ==
- Rudi Godden as Robert
- Kurt Seifert as Bertram
- Carla Rust as Lenchen
- Fritz Kampers as Strambach, Gefängnisverwalter
- Heinz Schorlemmer as Michael, Strambachs Neffe
- Herbert Hübner as Nathan Ipelmeyer, the Jewish Kommerzienrat
- Tatjana Sais as Isodora Ipelmeyer, his daughter
- Ursula Deinert as a dancer
- Robert Dorsay as Jack, Ipelmeyer's servant
- Erwin Biegel as Fochheimer
- Hans Stiebner as Blank, cop
- Arthur Schröder as Herr Biedermeier
- Willi Schur as a minstrel
- Eva Tinschmann as a minstrel
- Inge van der Straaten as Frau Ipelmeyer
- Friedrich Beug as the chief of the police
- Peter Bosse as Junge beim Ballonaufstieg
- Fred Goebel as a guard
- Harry Gondi as a guard
- Aribert Grimmer as Gendarm
- Otto F. Henning as Minister
- Fritz Hoopts as Flint, cop
- Kurt Keller-Nebri as Mylord beim Empfang Ipelmeyer
- Franz Kossak as 'Dame' von Café Kranzler
- Gustl Kreusch as 'Dame' von Café Kranzler
- Walter Lieck as Dr. Cordvan
- Alfred Maack as innkeeper
- Manfred Meurer as Lakai
- Arnim Münch as a bookkeeper
- Lucie Polzin as Mutter des Jungen
- F.W. Schröder-Schrom as one of Ipelmeyer's guests
- Rudolf Schündler as one of Ipelmeyer's guests
- Gerhard Dammann as Peter
- Claire Glib as a belly dancer
- Kurt Mikulski as Fritz
- Gerti Ober as a girl in the Café Kranzler
- Egon Stief as Mann mit der Kraftmaschine
- Auguste Wanner-Kirsch as Hochzeitgast
- Kurt Zehe as the giant at the fair

== Production ==
Robert and Bertram is based on Robert and Bertram by Gustav Raeder. An adaptation starring Ludwig Manfred Lommel and Kurt Vespermann entered production at Terra Film in 1935, but was not completed.

Leo Leux composed the soundtrack.

== Works cited ==
- Hull, David (1969). Film in the Third Reich: Art and Propaganda in Nazi Germany. Simon & Schuster. SBN 671214861.

== Bibliography ==
- O'Brien, Mary-Elizabeth (2006) [2004]. Nazi Cinema as Enchantment: The Politics of Entertainment in the Third Reich. Rochester, NY: Boydell & Brewer. ISBN 978-1-57113-334-2.
- Waldman, Harry (2008). Nazi Films in America, 1933–1942. Jefferson, NC: McFarland. ISBN 978-0-7864-3861-7.
