= Mistress Moon =

1941 film

- Directed by: Theo Lingen
- Written by: Ernst Marischka; Paul Siegel
- Produced by: Helmut Eweler; Franz Tappers
- Starring: Lizzi Waldmüller; Fita Benkhoff; Irene von Meyendorff
- Narrated by: Frau Luna by Heinrich Bolten-Baeckers
- Cinematography: Ekkehard Kyrath
- Edited by: Ella Ensink
- Music by: Paul Lincke; Paul Hühn
- Production company: Majestic Film
- Distributed by: Tobis Film
- Release date: 22 July 1941
- Running time: 96 minutes
- Country: Germany
- Language: German

Mistress Moon (German: Frau Luna) is a 1941 German musical comedy film directed by Theo Lingen and starring Lizzi Waldmüller, Fita Benkhoff and Irene von Meyendorff. An operetta film, it is based on the stage work Frau Luna composed by Paul Lincke. It was shot at the Halensee Studios in Berlin. The film's sets were designed by the art directors Heinrich Beisenherz and Alfred Bütow.

== Cast ==
- Lizzi Waldmüller as Operettensängerin Vera Waldner
- Fita Benkhoff as Frau Elisabeth Gerlack
- Irene von Meyendorff as Gerda
- Theo Lingen as Lepke
- Paul Kemp as Max
- Georg Alexander as Präsident Felix Lüdecke
- Paul Henckels as Geheimrat Schmidt
- Will Dohm as Direktor Knoppe
- Karl Schönböck as Paul Rüdinger
- Hubert von Meyerinck as Rat Haschke
- Paul Westermeier as Mechaniker Scholte
- Kurt Seifert as Paul Lindemann
- Jakob Tiedtke as Schlüssler
- Else von Möllendorff as Traute
- Ursula Herking as Cäcilie
- Günther Lüders as Friese
- Leo Peukert as Gastwirt
- Karl Platen as Regisseur am Apollo-Theater
- Klaus Pohl as Mann im Apollo-Theater
- Fred Goebel as Polizeibeamter
- Hans Hermann Schaufuß as Polizeirat aus Cottbus
- Angelo Ferrari as Polizeirat aus Cottbus
- Gerhard Dammann as Kutscher
- Olga Engl as schwerhörige Kundin
- Cordy Millowitsch as Frau Busebach

== Bibliography ==
- Bock, Hans-Michael & Bergfelder, Tim. The Concise CineGraph. Encyclopedia of German Cinema. Berghahn Books, 2009.
