= Artist Love =

1935 film directed by Fritz Wendhausen

- German: Künstlerliebe
- Directed by: Fritz Wendhausen
- Written by: Friedrich Dammann; Harald Röbbeling; Fritz Wendhausen
- Produced by: Frank Clifford
- Starring: Inge Schmidt; Wolfgang Liebeneiner; Olga Chekhova
- Cinematography: Emil Schünemann
- Edited by: Willy Zeunert
- Music by: Giuseppe Becce
- Production company: Lloyd-Film
- Distributed by: Terra Film
- Release date: 25 October 1935
- Running time: 93 minutes
- Country: Germany
- Language: German

Artist Love (German: Künstlerliebe) is a 1935 German historical drama film directed by Fritz Wendhausen and starring Inge Schmidt, Wolfgang Liebeneiner and Olga Chekhova.

The film's sets were designed by the art director Werner Schlichting.

== Synopsis ==
In 1887 in Munich, a rising artist paints a portrait of a dancer. The success of it during an exhibition leads to him being awarded a major commission in Rome, and he begins to move in high society. By the time he returns home he has almost forgotten about her.

== Cast ==
- Inge Schmidt as Toni
- Wolfgang Liebeneiner as Peter
- Olga Chekhova as Olivia Vanderhagen
- Hans Brausewetter as Stupps
- Harald Paulsen as Count Hohenstein
- Genia Nikolaieva as Mizzi
- Ilse Fürstenberg as Frau Heller
- Otto Sauter-Sarto as Herr Sedlmair
- Josefine Dora as Frau Sedlmair
- Paul Mederow as Professor Bergland
- F. W. Schröder-Schrom as Prince regent
- Klaus Pohl as ballet master
- Albert von Kersten as von Reedern
- Kurt Keller-Nebri as Intendant
- Paul Rehkopf as Artist love
- Valeska Stock as Frau Memminger
- Alfred Stein as Beamter im Glaspalast
- Max Tobien as Beamter im Glaspalast
- Nino Poli as Italian dealer
- Erika Nymgau-Odemar as Italian landlady
- Hanns Waschatko as packer
- Peter Frank-Höfer as Peter's friend
- Hans Bernuth as Peter's friend
- Heinrich Thomas as Peter's friend
- Eberhard Schott as Peter's friend
