= Ghost in the Castle =

1947 film

- Directed by: Hans H. Zerlett
- Written by: Hans H. Zerlett
- Starring: Margot Hielscher; Fritz Odemar; Albert Matterstock
- Cinematography: Josef Strecha
- Edited by: Walter Fredersdorf
- Music by: Leo Leux
- Production company: Bavaria Film
- Distributed by: Amerikanischer Allgemeiner Filmverleih
- Release date: 20 February 1947
- Running time: 82 minutes
- Country: West Germany
- Language: German

Ghost in the Castle (German: Spuk im Schloß) is a 1947 German comedy film, directed by Hans H. Zerlett and starring Margot Hielscher, Fritz Odemar, and Albert Matterstock.

The sets were designed by the art director Fritz Lück and Heinrich Weidemann. It was shot at the Bavaria Studios in Munich. Principal photography lasted from November 1943 until February 1944. The final cut was presented to the board of censors as late as March 1945, thus the film saw no release during World War II. The premiere was on February 20th, 1947.

== Plot ==
Gabriele Euler asks the owner of the J.M. Mauritius antique shop about a coat of arms of a castle seen in the background of an old tapestry, as she owns a silver family heirloom featuring the same coat of arms. It turns out to be the coat of arms for Uhlenfels castle. Attempting to find out more about her possible noble roots, Gabriele heads out to the castle, unaware that it is haunted. Later, the antique shop owner and his son, Robert, and daughter, Dagmar seek help at Uhlenfels after their car breaks down near it. The servant states that they can spend the night, but not to leave their rooms. Overcome by curiosity, Robert sneaks out of his room during the night only to see a painting come to life. The next day sees Gabriele arrive at the castle, where Robert tells her about what he saw, so he and Gabriele decide to wait and see what takes place that night.

== Cast ==
- Margot Hielscher as Gabriele Euler
- Fritz Odemar as J. M. Mauritius
- Albert Matterstock as Robert Mauritius
- Sonja Ziemann as Dagmar Mauritius
- Alice Treff as Clara Röhr
- Ernst Fritz Fürbringer as Alexander Graf
- Paul Kemp as Waldemar
- Hilde Hildebrand as Camilla
- Wilfried Seyferth as Willi Busse
- Eva Tinschmann as Mamsell
- Max Gülstorff
- Victor Janson

== See also ==
- Überläufer

== Bibliography ==
- Bock, Hans-Michael; Bergfelder, Tim, eds. (2009). The Concise Cinegraph: Encyclopaedia of German Cinema. New York: Berghahn Books. ISBN 978-1-57181-655-9.
