= Irene von Meyendorff =

Russian-born German-British actress (1916–2001)

- Born: 6 June 1916; Tallinn, Russian Empire
- Died: 28 September 2001 (aged 85); King's Somborne, Hampshire, United Kingdom
- Occupation: Actress
- Years active: 1936-1968 (film)

Baroness Irene von Meyendorff (6 June 1916 – 28 September 2001) was a Russian-born German-British actress.

== Biography ==
Baroness Irene von Meyendorff was of Baltic German origin, born in 1916 in Tallinn (then Reval, Russian Empire), Estonia as the eldest child of a German-Baltic aristocrat. Her birth name and title was Baroness Irene Isabella Margarete Pauline Caecila von Meyendorff. In the early 1930s she moved to Berlin to work as a cutter in the UFA film studios of Babelsberg. Her beauty soon landed her first film roles and the attention of Joseph Goebbels. Being purported to represent the purest ideal of Aryan beauty, the actress portrayed mostly noble patricians. The sale of her promotional postcards shows that she was the number one pin-up girl among the German Army during World War II.

She was cast by propaganda director Veit Harlan twice: in 1944 in Opfergang and in 1945 in Kolberg. The production of these elaborately produced colour films was strictly supervised by Goebbels; Kolberg was the most expensive film ever produced in Germany (with the budget of 8.5 million Reichsmarks), intended to celebrate the 12th anniversary of Adolf Hitler's ascent to power, opening on 30 January 1945. In 1960, she met British actor James Robertson Justice, fell in love with him and left her third husband Pit Severin, a journalist from Hamburg, to follow Justice to Britain. She all but gave up acting, returning only briefly in such films as the costume drama Mayerling (1968).

She became a British citizen in 1967, and changed her name to Irina. A series of strokes, starting in 1968, gradually prevented James Robertson Justice from working again and led to his eventual bankruptcy. Irina nursed him until his death in 1975. After 14 years of living together, they were finally married on his deathbed in hospital three days before he died.

At the age of 70, she sailed to the Arctic and the Orinoco River. In 1990, she married Justice's best friend and their neighbour, millionaire and philanthropist — heir to shoe sellers Russell & Bromley — Frederick Keith ("Toby") Bromley. On 28 September 2001 she died in Hampshire, aged 85.

== Filmography ==
- The Last Four on Santa Cruz (1936)
- The Traitor (1936)
- Travelling People (1938)
- The Stars Shine (1938)
- Two Women (1938)
- Wibbel the Tailor (1939)
- Linen from Ireland (1939)
- We Danced Around the World (1939)
- Casanova heiratet (1940)
- Mistress Moon (1941)
- Was geschah in dieser Nacht ? (1941)
- To Be God One Time (1942)
- Whom the Gods Love (1942)
- Johann (1943)
- Harald Arrives at Nine (1944)
- Opfergang (1944)
- Philharmonic (1944)
- Eine kleine Sommermelodie (1944)
- Kolberg (1945)
- Film Without a Title (1948)
- The Original Sin (1948)
- 1x1 der Ehe (1949)
- The Orplid Mystery (1950)
- A Rare Lover (1950)
- Poison in the Zoo (1952)
- The Cousin from Nowhere (1953)
- Portrait of an Unknown Woman (1954)
- Captain Wronski (1954)
- Versuchung (1955)
- Holiday in Tyrol (1955)
- Three Birch Trees on the Heath (1956)
- Die Freundin meines Mannes (1957)
- In Namen einer Mutter (1960)
- The Ambassador (1960)
- Das Paradies (1960, TV)
- Hell Is Empty (1965)
- Long Legs, Long Fingers (1965)
- Mayerling (1968)
