= Rudi Godden =

German singer and actor

- Born: 18 April 1907; Berlin, German Empire
- Died: 4 January 1941 (aged 33); Berlin, Nazi Germany
- Occupations: Film actor, singer

Rudi Godden (18 April 1907 – 4 January 1941) was a German singer and film actor, notable for his role in Nazi-era musical films such as Hello Janine! and Robert and Bertram. Das Gewehr Űber (Shoulder Arms) was a 1939 propaganda film. Godden unexpectedly died of blood poisoning in 1941.

== Selected filmography ==
- Truxa (1937)
- Musketier Meier III (1938)
- The Stars Shine (1938)
- The Great and the Little Love (1938)
- Hello Janine! (1939)
- The Golden Mask (1939)
- Shoulder Arms (1939)
- Robert and Bertram (1939)
- Polterabend (1940)
- Die lustigen Vagabunden (1940)
- The Unfaithful Eckehart (1940)

== Bibliography ==
- O'Brien, Mary-Elizabeth. Nazi Cinema as Enchantment: The Politics of Entertainment in the Third Reich. Camden House, 2006.
