= F. W. Schröder-Schrom =

German actor (1879–1956)

F.W. Schröder-Schrom
- Born: Franz Wilhelm Emil Schröder; 31 May 1879; Frankfurt, German Empire
- Died: 10 May 1956 (aged 76); West Berlin, West Germany
- Occupation: Actor
- Years active: 1920–1955 (film)

F.W. Schröder-Schrom (31 May 1879 – 10 May 1956) was a German actor who appeared in more than a hundred films between 1920 and 1955 including the military comedy-drama Shoulder Arms (1939).

== Selected filmography ==
- The Monastery's Hunter (1920)
- Eternal River (1920)
- Black Monday (1922)
- Rosenmontag (1924)
- Father Voss (1925)
- Cock of the Roost (1925)
- Don Juan in a Girls' School (1928)
- Eight Girls in a Boat (1932)
- Trenck (1932)
- The Invisible Front (1932)
- The First Right of the Child (1932)
- Marshal Forwards (1932)
- The Burning Secret (1933)
- Dream of the Rhine (1933)
- A Thousand for One Night (1933)
- The Roberts Case (1933)
- Girls of Today (1933)
- A Precocious Girl (1934)
- The Prodigal Son (1934)
- Forget Me Not (1935)
- Streak of Steel (1935)
- A Night of Change (1935)
- The Man with the Paw (1935)
- Artist Love (1935)
- The Saint and Her Fool (1935)
- Tomfoolery (1936)
- Family Parade (1936)
- Stronger Than Regulations (1936)
- The Haunted Castle (1936)
- The Unknown (1936)
- Togger (1937)
- Crooks in Tails (1937)
- Seven Slaps (1937)
- Tango Notturno (1937)
- The Man Who Was Sherlock Holmes (1937)
- Anna Favetti (1938)
- The Impossible Mister Pitt (1938)
- Red Orchids (1938)
- By a Silken Thread (1938)
- Police Report (1939)
- Who's Kissing Madeleine? (1939)
- Between River and Steppe (1939)
- Ursula Under Suspicion (1939)
- The Governor (1939)
- Robert and Bertram (1939)
- Shoulder Arms (1939)
- Passion (1940)
- Alarm (1941)
- The Endless Road (1943)
- The Noltenius Brothers (1945)
- Via Mala (1945)
- Rumpelstiltskin (1955)

== Bibliography ==
- Richards, Jeffrey. Visions of Yesterday. Routledge & Kegan Paul, 1973.
