= Shoulder Arms (1939 film) =

1939 German drama film

- Directed by: Jürgen von Alten
- Written by: Kurt E. Walter
- Based on: Kompagnie Olympia novel by Wolfgang Marken
- Starring: F.W. Schröder-Schrom; Rolf Moebius; Rudi Godden; Carsta Löck
- Cinematography: Phil Jutzi
- Edited by: Willy Zeunert
- Music by: Felix Glessmer; Hanson Milde-Meissner
- Production company: Germania-Film
- Distributed by: Various
- Release date: 7 December 1939
- Running time: 97 minutes
- Country: Germany
- Language: German

Shoulder Arms (German: Das Gewehr über) is a 1939 German drama film directed by Jürgen von Alten and starring F.W. Schröder-Schrom, Rolf Moebius and Rudi Godden. It was based on a novel by Wolfgang Marken. The film's German title refers to a word of command in the German drill book.

A German emigrant to Australia becomes concerned that his son has been too strongly influenced by the democratic, permissive attitudes of the country and decides to send him back to Germany for military service. While his son at first resents and resists his new lifestyle, he is eventually converted to the cause of Nazi Germany.

The film was made as a piece of propaganda to support the policies of the Nazi regime. It was one of a growing number of films of the late 1930s that were disparaging of life in the British Empire on the eve of the Second World War.

== Cast ==
- F.W. Schröder-Schrom Hartwig sen.
- Rolf Moebius as Paul Hartwig
- Rudi Godden as Gestütaufseher Charlie Kühne
- Carsta Löck as Lotte
- Hilde Schneider as Hühnerfarmbesitzerin Trude Schmidt
- Wolfgang Staudte as Unteroffizier Schmidt
- Georg H. Schnell as Großkaufmann Thomson
- Charlott Daudert as Evelyne Thomson
- Leopold von Ledebur as General A. D. Henning
- Wilhelm Althaus as Hauptmann Wehnert
- Ernst Bader as Leutnant Stolle
- Walter Bechmann as Sekretär Schmitz
- Horst Birr as Schütze Jupp Derksen
- Adolf Fischer as Unteroffizier Schmidt
- Walter Gross as Reporter des 'Blankenheimer Tageblatt'
- Hans Jöckel as Schütze Hermann Lutz
- Hans Reinhard Knitsch as Gefreiter Hellermann
- Franz Kossak as Oberfeldwebel Grosse
- Viktor Carter
- Bernhard Caspar
- Gerdi Gerdt
- Käthe Jöken-König
- Erwin Laurenz
- Trude Lehmann
- Benno Mueller
- Hellmuth Passarge
- Klaus Pohl
- Martin Rickelt
- Bert Schmidt-Maris
- Hans Schneider
- Waldemar Tenscher
- Georg Völkel
- Herbert Asmis
- Heinz Berghaus

== Production ==
Shoulder Arms was directed by Jürgen von Alten and produced by Germania-Film.

== Release ==
It was banned from being shown in Germany by the Allied High Commission after World War II.

== Works cited ==
- Kelson, John (1996). Catalogue of Forbidden German Feature and Short Film Productions held in Zonal Film Archives of Film Section, Information Services Division, Control Commission for Germany, (BE) (2 ed.). Greenwood Publishing Group. ISBN 0948911190.
