= Rolf Moebius =

German actor

- Born: 27 July 1915; Riesa, Kingdom of Saxony, German Empire
- Died: 4 June 2004 (aged 88); Berlin, Germany
- Occupation: Actor
- Years active: 1936–1986

Rolf Moebius (27 July 1915 – 4 June 2004) was a German actor. He starred in the 1939 film Shoulder Arms.

== Partial filmography ==
- The Dreamer (1936) - Minor Role
- Fanny Elssler (1937) - Duke of Reichstadt
- Urlaub auf Ehrenwort (1938) - Leutnant Walter Prätorius
- Triad (1938) - Ulrich von Möller - sein Sohn
- Play in the Summer Breezes (1939) - Percy Averhoff
- The Curtain Falls (1939) - Hans Günther
- Shoulder Arms (1939) - Paul Hartwig
- We Danced Around the World (1939) - Herbert
- The Years Pass (1945) - Peter Behrendsen, Sohn von Irene und Georg
- Wir sehn uns wieder (1945) - Jochen Gröner - Oberleutnant
- Verspieltes Leben (1949) - Leutnant Dieter Lorenzen
- The Lie (1950)
- Desire (1951) - Paul - ein Maler
- Das ewige Spiel (1951)
- Das späte Mädchen (1951) - Brüggemann
- Herz der Welt (1952)
- Road to Home (1952) - Walter Neuhauser
- Tödliche Liebe (1953) - Polizeireporter
- Grandstand for General Staff (1953) - Herzog Karl Eberhard
- The Plot to Assassinate Hitler (1955) - Ordonnanzoffizier
- Der Hauptmann und sein Held (1955)
- Ein Polterabend (1955) - Adolf 'Brennglas' Glasbrenner
- Besondere Kennzeichen: keine (1956) - Werner Schneider
- Treffpunkt Aimée (1956) - Dr. Markus
- Les Misérables (1958) - L'avocat général
- U 47 – Kapitänleutnant Prien (1958) - Stabschef
- Das verbotene Paradies (1958) - Amtsrichter
- Aus dem Tagebuch eines Frauenarztes (1959) - Georg Callway
- The Black Chapel (1959) - Adjutant
- The 1,000 Eyes of Dr. Mabuse (1960) - Police-Officer
- Heidi (1965) - Dr. Rudolf Classen
- Herzblatt oder Wie sag ich’s meiner Tochter? (1969) - 2. Herr im Ministerium
- Heintje – Einmal wird die Sonne wieder scheinen (1970) - Bankangestellter
- Die neuen Leiden des jungen W. (1976)

== Bibliography ==
- Richards, Jeffrey. Visions of Yesterday. Routledge & Kegan Paul, 1973.
