= Truxa =

1937 film

- Directed by: Hans H. Zerlett
- Written by: Heinrich Seiler (novel); Hans H. Zerlett
- Produced by: Karl Julius Fritzsche
- Starring: La Jana; Hannes Stelzer; Ernst Fritz Fürbringer; Mady Rahl
- Cinematography: Friedl Behn-Grund
- Edited by: Walter Fredersdorf
- Music by: Leo Leux; Matthias Perl
- Production company: Tobis Film
- Distributed by: Europa Film
- Release date: 19 January 1937
- Running time: 92 minutes
- Country: Germany
- Language: German

Truxa is a 1937 German drama film directed by Hans H. Zerlett and starring La Jana, Hannes Stelzer, and Ernst Fritz Fürbringer. It is a Circus film, based on a novel by Heinrich Seiler. The film was released in the United States and was one of the most successful German films shown in America that year.

It was remade in Britain the following year as Star of the Circus.

== Partial cast ==
- La Jana as Yester, Tänzerin
- Hannes Stelzer as Husen, Drahtseilkünstler
- Ernst Fritz Fürbringer as Garvin, Illusionist
- Mady Rahl as Hilde, Garvins Assistentin
- Peter Elsholtz as Truxa, Artist
- Rudi Godden as Peters, Inspizient
- Rudolf Klein-Rogge as Varieté-Direktor
- Eva Tinschmann as Frau Schilp
- Hedi Höpfner as 1. Tänzerin
- Margot Höpfner as 2. Tänzerin
- Erwin Biegel as Pipo, Clown
- Curt Lucas as Jimmy, Garvins Assistenz
- Bertold Reissig as Bühnenportier
- Alfred Stratmann as Nachtwächter
- Hermann Pfeiffer as Varieté-Agent
- Marie Sera as Therese, Yesters Gardrobiere
- Barbara Galloni as Sekretärin
- Fritz Linn as Theaterarzt
- Edgard Eitner as Drahtseilartist
- Julius Eckhoff as Varieté-Künstler
- Curt Cappi as Kellner
- Karin Luesebrink as Nummerngirl
- Hans Söhnker as Chef einer Tanzgrippe

== Bibliography ==
- O'Brien, Mary-Elizabeth (2006) [2004]. Nazi Cinema as Enchantment: The Politics of Entertainment in the Third Reich. Rochester, NY: Boydell & Brewer. ISBN 978-1-57113-334-2.
- Waldman, Harry (2008). Nazi Films in America, 1933–1942. Jefferson, NC: McFarland. ISBN 978-0-7864-3861-7.
