= The Stars Shine =

1938 film

- DVD cover
- Es leuchten die Sterne
- Directed by: Hans H. Zerlett
- Written by: Hans Hannes; Hans H. Zerlett
- Produced by: Helmut Schreiber
- Starring: Ernst Fritz Fürbringer; Fridtjof Mjøen; Paul Verhoeven; Karel Stepanek
- Cinematography: Georg Krause
- Edited by: Ella Ensink
- Music by: Paul Lincke; Ernst Kirsch; Leo Leux; Franz R. Friedl; Mathias Perl
- Production company: Tobis Film
- Distributed by: Tobis Film (Germany); American Tobis Company (United States)
- Release date: 17 March 1938 (German theatrical)
- Country: Nazi Germany
- Language: German

The Stars Shine (German: Es leuchten die Sterne) is a 1938 German musical revue directed by Hans H. Zerlett and written by Zerlett and Hans Hannes.

== Synopsis ==
A young secretary leaves the country and travels to Berlin to seek work as an actress. In a comedy of errors, she is mistaken for a famous dancer, which results in her heading the cast of a star-studded musical. The plot acts as a backdrop for this musical revue film, which includes many German film, sports, and entertainment stars of the 1930s.

== Background ==
Es leuchten die Sterne was a remake of the 1930 Tobis film Die Große Sehnsucht (The Great Yearning), directed by Stefan Szekely, a Hungarian Jew. The remake was created as a Busby Berkeley-style musical set inside a movie studio, and featured appearances by numerous stage personalities, athletes, and Tobis Films stars. Joseph Goebbels was Propaganda Minister and considered entertainment films to be the best type of media with which to convey the political message of the Nazi regime. Es leuchten die Sterne was created, as were many German films of the period, to act as a propaganda piece promoting the Third Reich as a cultural entity.

=== Release ===
The film was first released in Germany on 17 March 1938. This was followed by a release in the Netherlands on 29 April, and then in the United States on 20 May as The Stars Shine. It was released in various countries under different titles: in Belgium as Als de sterren schitteren (Flemish) and as Quand les étoiles brillent (French); in Italy as Brillano le stelle; in Denmark as Funklende stjerner; in Greece as Lampoun t' asteria; in France as Les étoiles brillent and as Vedettes follies; and in the Netherlands as Parade der sterren and Sterrenparade. The film was released on DVD in its original German version on 21 July 2008 by Warner Home Video.

Excerpts from the film were shown on German television in 1938, with La Jana present in the studio.

== Cast ==
- La Jana as The Dancer
- Ernst Fritz Fürbringer as Hans Holger
- Fridtjof Mjøen as Werner Baumann
- Paul Verhoeven as Gebauer
- Karel Stepanek as Brandt
- Paal Roschberg as the Dancer (billed as Paul Roschberg)
- Arthur Schröder as the Director
- Rosita Serrano as the Spanish singer
- Hermann Pfeiffer as the Production manager
- Rudolf Schündler as the Insurance man
- Vera Bergman as Carla Walden
- Carla Rust as Mathilde Birk
- Rudi Godden as Knutz the manager
- Elisabeth Wendt as Lisa Marwen
- Else Elster as Mrs. Knutz
- Eva Tinschmann as Mrs. Bökelmann
- Horst Birr as Kruse
- Erwin Biegel as Kellner
- Erika Steenbock as Ella the actress
- Heinz Piper as the Lyricist
- Kurt Mikulski as Böckelmann the makeup artist

Featured appearances

- Rudolf Caracciola
- Olga Chekhova
- Lil Dagover
- Karl Ludwig Diehl
- Käthe Dorsch
- Willi Forst
- Charles Francois
- Gustav Fröhlich
- Heinrich George
- Walter Gross
- Paul Hartmann
- Hilde Hildebrand
- Paul Hörbiger
- Jenny Jugo
- Paul Kemp
- Hermann Lang
- Wolfgang Liebeneiner
- Harry Liedtke
- Paul Lincke
- Theo Lingen
- Hans Moser
- Anny Ondra
- Harald Paulsen
- Ralph Arthur Roberts
- Max Schmeling
- Sybille Schmitz
- Albrecht Schoenhals
- Hans Söhnker
- Luis Trenker
- Manfred von Brauchitsch
- Grethe Weiser
- Ida Wüst
