= Hans H. Zerlett =

German film director and screenwriter (1892–1949)

- Born: Hans Heinz Zerlett; 17 October 1892; Wiesbaden, German Empire
- Died: 6 July 1949 (aged 56); NKVD special camp Nr. 2, Weimar, Soviet occupation zone in Germany
- Occupations: Director; Screenwriter
- Years active: 1921–1945

Hans Heinz Zerlett (17 October 1892 – 6 July 1949) was a German screenwriter and film director.

== Life ==
Hans H. Zerlett was the son of a musical director and the brother of the screenwriter Walter Zerlett-Olfenius. He initially worked as a theatre actor and served as a soldier in World War I, but had to leave military service early due to illness. After the war he gradually moved from acting to dramaturge in the author's service and wrote revues, schlager lyrics, and cabaret lyrics. He sold his first screenplay in 1927.

He made 25 films under the Third Reich, becoming a key figure in Nazi cinema, a member of the Nazi Party and a close friend of the Nazi culture-politician Hans Hinkel. He made his directorial debut in 1934 with the Karl Valentin short film Im Schallplattenladen and the comedy Da stimmt was nicht, with Viktor de Kowa and Adele Sandrock. Zerlett's greatest success was the 1936 medical drama Arzt aus Leidenschaft and the 1938 revue film Es leuchten die Sterne, with La Jana. During the following years he also made propaganda films, such as the anti-Semitic 1939 musical Robert und Bertram and the anti-'degenerate art' Venus vor Gericht (1941).

In the late 1930s Zerlett made friends with prominent sportsmen such as Gustav Jaenecke, Gottfried von Cramm, Rudolf Caracciola, Max Schmeling, along with the actor Hans Albers and the singer Michael Bohnen, who he used to meet regularly at the "Roxy-Sportbar" in Joachimstaler Straße in Berlin. In autumn 1938, however, he broke up with them after a heated argument about the threat of war. His former circle of friends told the Gestapo of the argument, and the next day the landlady of the bar and the actor Rolf von Goth were arrested. Shortly before the Second World War he (as a UFA director) left for Bad Saarow near Berlin and bought his friend Max Schmeling's house (Zerlett had made the 1935 sports film Knockout – Ein junges Mädchen, ein junger Mann with Schmeling and his wife Anny Ondra, along with directing the 1936 documentary Max Schmelings Sieg – Ein deutscher Sieg).

On 23 January 1946 he was tracked down in Bad Saarow by the Soviet secret service and interned. He died of tuberculosis in 1949 in Soviet Special Camp 2, in the grounds of the former Buchenwald concentration camp.

== Partial filmography ==
=== As screenwriter ===
- Meine Frau, das Fräulein (1921)
- Das Liebesverbot (1922)
- Die erste Nacht (1922)
- Meine Braut ... Deine Braut (1924)
- Das Radiomädel (1924)
- Der Skandal mit Molly (1924)
- Die tanzenden Fräuleins (1926)
- Light-Hearted Isabel (1927)
- Pit Pit (1927)
- Inherited Passions (1929)
- The Man Without Love (1929)
- Daughter of the Regiment (1929)
- The Great Longing (1930)
- The Caviar Princess (1930)
- Fairground People (1930)
- The Jumping Jack (1930)
- Morals at Midnight (1930)
- Two People (1930)
- I Go Out and You Stay Here (1931)
- Die Fledermaus (1931)
- The Concert (1931)
- The Beggar Student (1931)
- A Man with Heart (1932)
- Monsieur, Madame and Bibi (1932)
- A Bit of Love (1932)
- Kiki (1932)
- Mamsell Nitouche (1932)
- The Love Hotel (1933)
- The Castle in the South (1933)
- Dream Castle (1933)
- Daughter of the Regiment (1933)
- The Csardas Princess (1934)
- The Switched Bride (1934)
- The Young Count (1935)
- The Blonde Carmen (1935)
- Star of the Circus (1938)
- Venus on Trial (1941)

=== As director ===
- Ein Walzer für dich (1934)
- Im Schallplattenladen (1934)
- Da stimmt was nicht (1934)
- His Late Excellency (1935)
- Knockout (1935)
- A Doctor of Conviction (1936)
- Moral (1936)
- Dinner Is Served (1936)
- Max Schmelings Sieg - Ein deutscher Sieg (1936)
- The Ways of Love Are Strange (1937)
- Truxa (1937)
- The Stars Shine (1937)
- Revolutionary Wedding (1938)
- Adventure in Love (1938)
- Two Women (1938)
- Robert and Bertram (1939)
- The Golden Mask (1939)
- My Daughter Doesn't Do That (1940)
- Venus on Trial (1941)
- My Friend Josephine (1942)
- To Be God One Time (1942)
- The Little Residence (1942)
- Journey into the Past (1943)
- Love Letters (1944)
- Ghost in the Castle (1947)
- In the Temple of Venus (1948)
