= Hans Helfritz =

German composer and photographer

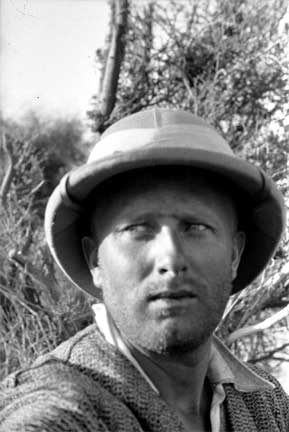

Hans Helfritz (25 July 1902, Chemnitz – 21 October 1995, Duisburg) was a German composer and photographer.

== Biography ==
Owing to pressure from his parents, Helfritz originally began an apprenticeship as a banker, a career path he soon gave up in order to study music and composition in Berlin and Vienna. Inspired by his teacher Erich von Hornbostel in 1930, he travelled to Egypt, Palestine, Syria and Iraq to collect samples of folk music for his research. In 1935 he continued his travels to India, Sri Lanka, Malaysia, the Republic of China and Singapore.

Helfritz also made films about Yemen and Mexico as an assignment for Ufa. In these films he deliberately evaded the right-wing line of Joseph Goebbels of presenting foreign ethnicities as culturally inferior.

In 1939 Helfritz fled Germany because of his homosexuality and political beliefs which meant he was labelled an enemy of the Nazi state. He fled first to Brazil and Bolivia, before settling in Chile. He continued to work, taking part in the Chilean Antarctic Expedition as the official photographer. At the end of the 1940s he received Chilean citizenship. Throughout the 1950s Helfritz explored Central America and West Africa from an archaeological perspective. Later he changed profession, working first as a tour guide in these regions, then as travel lecturer. In 1959 he settled down in Ibiza.

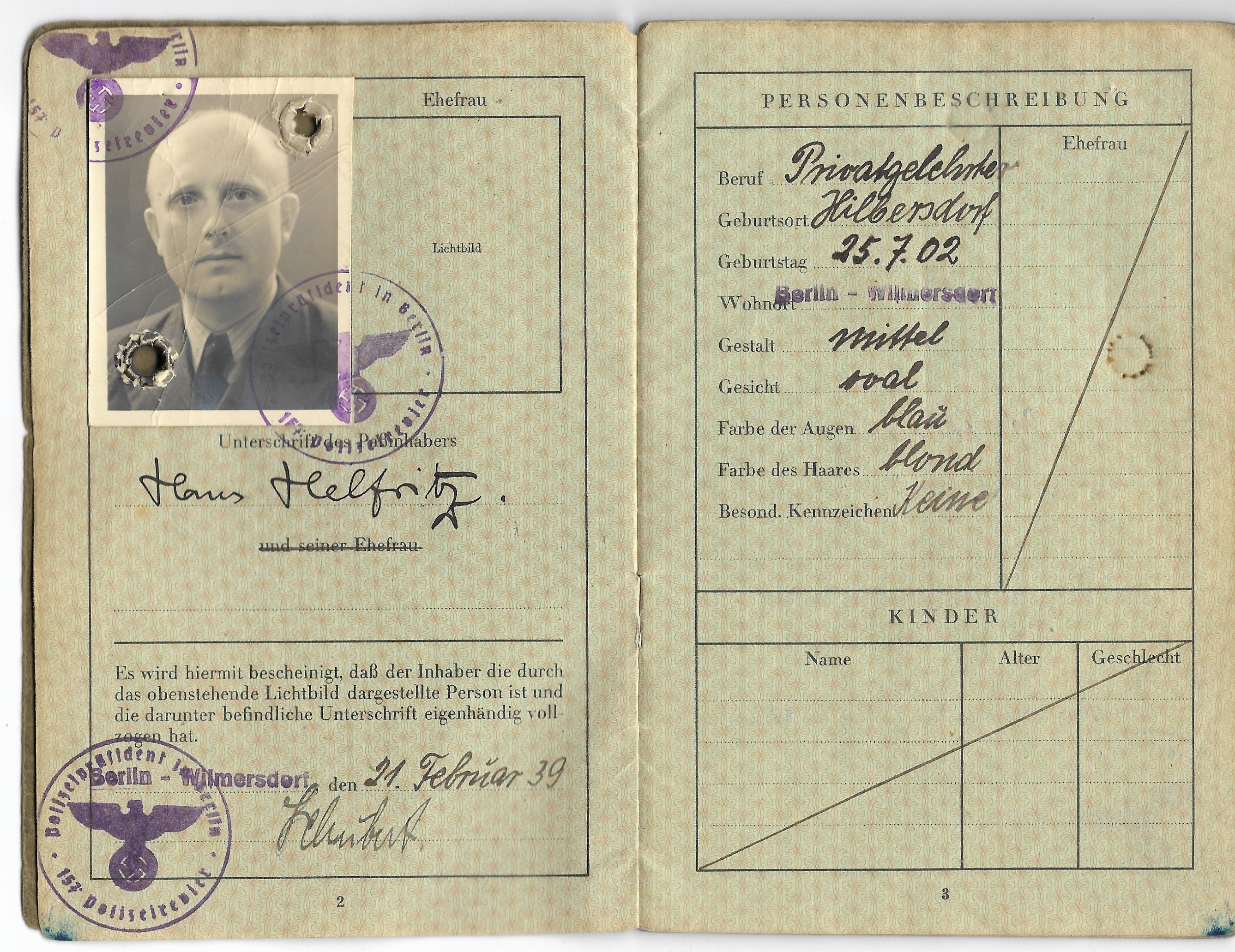
Hans Helfritz's passport used to escape Nazi Germany.
