= Renate in the Quartet =

1939 film directed by Paul Verhoeven

- Directed by: Paul Verhoeven
- Written by: Geog Albrecht von Ihering (novel); Herbert Tjadens; Paul Verhoeven
- Produced by: Heinrich Jonen
- Starring: Käthe von Nagy; Hans Brausewetter; Gustav Fröhlich; Attila Hörbiger
- Cinematography: Willy Winterstein
- Edited by: Walter von Bonhorst
- Music by: Norbert Schultze
- Production company: Tobis Film
- Distributed by: Tobis Film
- Release date: 24 August 1939
- Running time: 88 minutes
- Country: Germany
- Language: German

Renate in the Quartet (German: Renate im Quartett) is a 1939 German musical comedy film directed by Paul Verhoeven and starring Käthe von Nagy, Hans Brausewetter and Gustav Fröhlich. It is based on a novel by Geog Albrecht von Ihering.

== Synopsis ==
When a female violinist joins an otherwise all-male musical quartet, the other members struggle to cope.

== Cast ==
- Käthe von Nagy as Renate Schmidt
- Hans Brausewetter as Peter Vogt
- Gustav Fröhlich as Kurt Kielmansdorf
- Attila Hörbiger as Michael Börne
- Anton Pointner as Räusperer
- Johannes Riemann as Walter Bauer
- Walter Gross as Varieté-Regisseur
- Harald Paulsen as Paul Erdmann
- Josef Dahmen as Musiker am Konservatorium
- Herma Relin as Hella Schütz
- Ingeborg von Kusserow as Li, Frau Ambergs Nichte
- Jac Diehl as Varieté-Angestellter
- Wolfgang Dohnberg as Varieté-Inspizient
- Reinhold Hauser as Gesundheitsprotz
- Ingolf Kuntze as Direktor des Konservatoriums
- Walter Lieck as Dr. N.
- Olga Limburg as Frau Amberg
- Heinz Müller as Direktionsmitglied im Varieté
- Franz Pfaudler as Wirt im Bahnhofsrestaurant
- Erika Raphael as Lo, Frau Ambergs Nichte
- Norbert Schultze as Dirigent am Konservatorium
- Maria Seidler as 2. Platzanweiserin
- Hilde Spies as Wirtin
- Franz Weber as Professor Klinger
- Klaus Pohl
- Theo Brandt

== Bibliography ==
- Hake, Sabine (2001). Popular Cinema of the Third Reich. University of Texas Press. ISBN 978-0-292-73458-6.
