= La Jana (actress) =

Austrian actress

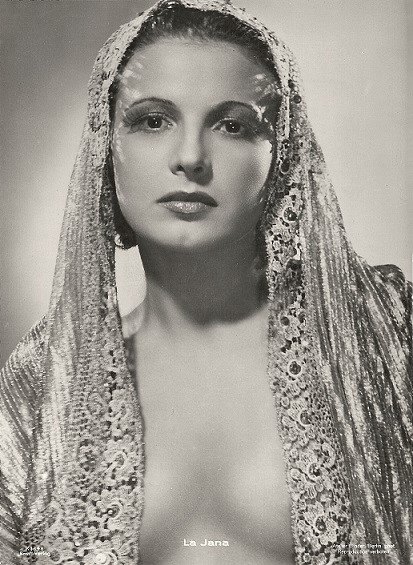
- Born: 24 February 1905; Vienna, Austro-Hungarian Empire
- Died: 13 March 1940 (aged 35); Berlin, Nazi Germany
- Occupations: Actress, Dancer
- Years active: 1925–1940 (film)

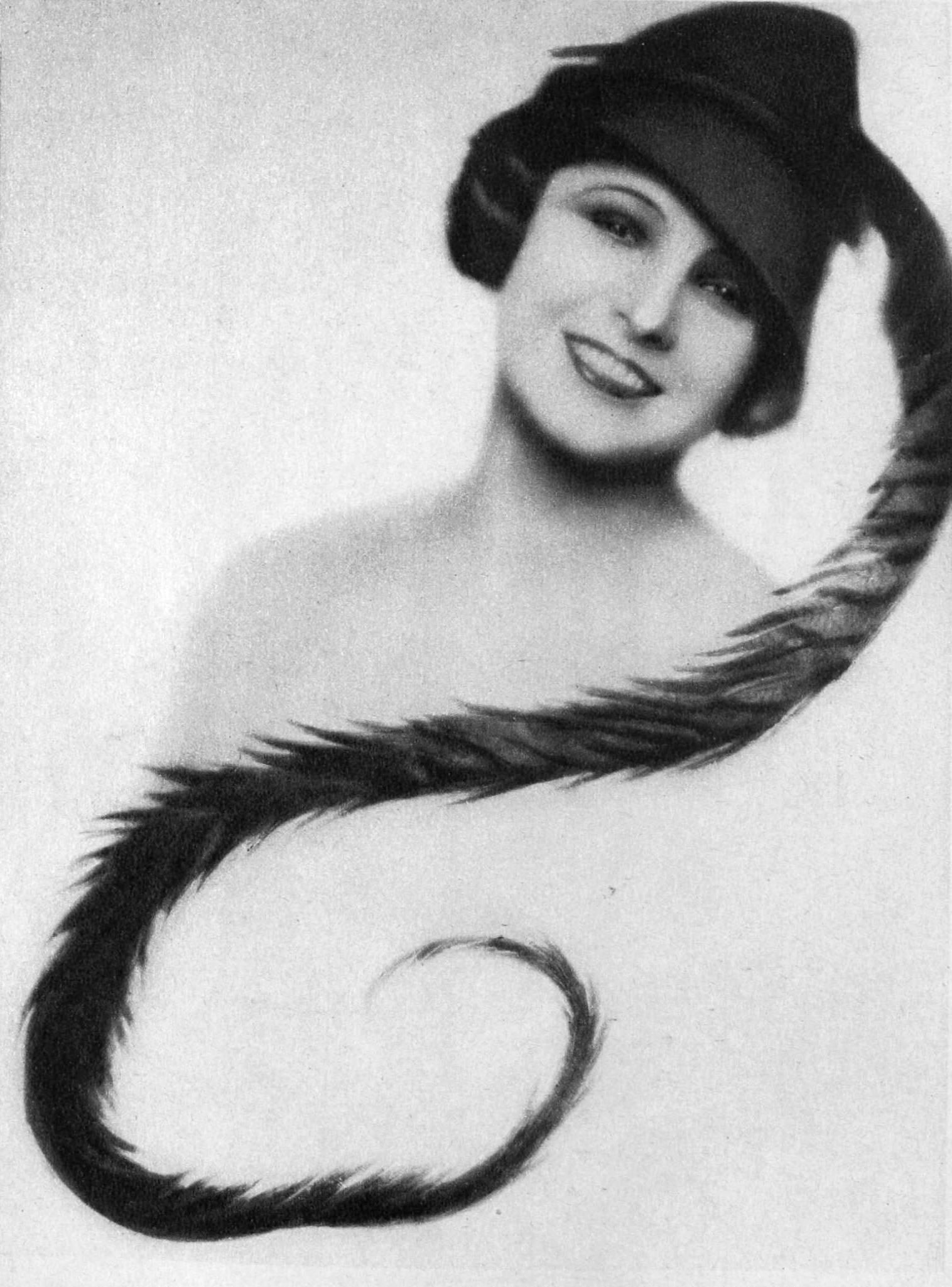
La Jana around 1928

La Jana (born Henriette Margareta Niederauer, later surnamed Hiebel; 24 February 1905 – 13 March 1940) was an Austro-German dancer and actress.

== Life and career ==
Born in Vienna as Henriette Margareta "Henny" Niederauer, the illegitimate daughter of the master gilder Heinrich Hiebel and his housekeeper Anna Niederauer, her parents did not wed until 1909, in Frankfurt. The children grew up in the old city, near the Goethe House. Henny's older sister, Anny, later trained as an opera singer.

Henny trained as a dancer at the Frankfurt Opera Ballet; she first appeared on stage there at the age of 8 and later became a dancer in revues.

In his autobiography, Géza von Cziffra says that he encountered her in the Chat Noir cabaret in Paris and brought her back to Berlin, where he introduced her to Frederic Zelnik and got her into films. He describes her as he saw her then:

And there I saw her dance for the first time: that woman possessed the most attractive body that I had set eyes upon in my not all that long life. The girl, here moving to and fro in the spotlight . . . had a boyish build: slim hips, practically just the suggestion of a bust. . . . She was a simple, nice, approachable girl, but she had as much interest in sex as in Immanuel Kant. That's to say, none at all.

Géza von Cziffra's version of events is disputed. There are at least two other versions of how La Jana was discovered. According to contemporary reports, she was first discovered in Frankfurt, at the Weinklause cabaret, before going to Berlin to dance. Another story is that she was brought in at a day's notice to replace the ailing star of a revue in Dresden and later received engagements in Berlin as a result.

Around 1926, La Jana, still known as Henny Hiebel, became engaged to the actor Ulrich Bettac. That year she moved with him to Berlin; however, the engagement was called off a few years later.

She appeared as a dancer in revues in Berlin, Stockholm (1933) and London (1934/35) among other cities, performing in Herman Haller's An und Aus, Erik Charell's Casanova and Max Reinhardt's Die schöne Helena. In Casanova she was presented to the audience semi-naked on a silver platter. She became the talk of Berlin. Crown Prince Wilhelm became her lover and visited her regularly at her villa in Grunewald. There were also rumours of an affair between her and Joseph Goebbels. The impresario Charles B. Cochran, in contrast, reports reading in a newspaper that "Hitler was seldom seen in public without La Jana". When Charlie Chaplin was in Berlin, they had an affair which he wrote up for the Women's Home Companion. But she is said to have been married to or at least living with the opera singer Michael Bohnen.

With Cochran's Streamline, La Jana toured throughout England and Scotland in 1934. In this show, she played a Spanish dancer. After her return to Germany, Truxa (filmed in 1936, released in 1937) made her a film star, and from then on she appeared in one or more films almost every year. She represented an exotic, not typically German type of womanhood. After she travelled to India with Richard Eichberg, millions admired her in the films she made there, Der Tiger von Eschnapur and Das indische Grabmal, which also featured Frits van Dongen, Theo Lingen and Gisela Schlüter amongst others. In Menschen vom Variete and Es leuchten die Sterne, she appeared with Hans Moser and Grethe Weiser amongst others. She "initiate[d] the experiments of Nazi cinema in mimicking the Hollywood musical" and became the top dance and musical star in German films.

== Death ==
In the winter of 1939/40, La Jana was engaged for a multi-city tour of Germany entertaining the troops, since her fame made her an assured draw. In February 1940, she fell ill with bilateral pneumonia, and she died on 13 March 1940, aged 35, in Wilmersdorf. The premiere of her last film, The Star of Rio, took place a week later on 20 March at the Ufa-Palast am Zoo.

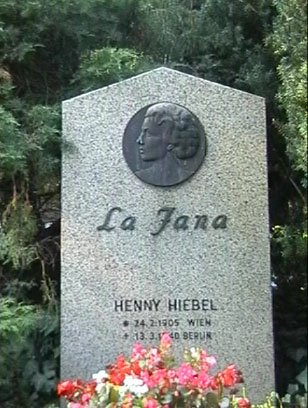
La Jana's grave in Waldfriedhof Dahlem, Berlin

La Jana was buried in Waldfriedhof Dahlem. The grave site had been cleared, but on 25 September 1990, the City of Berlin declared it an honorary grave and it is now marked by a simple stone with a bas relief plaque of her in profile. The stone had been kept at the Heimatmuseum in Steglitz.

== Stage name ==
According to contemporary reports, 'La Jana' was an Indian name meaning 'like a flower'. It is likely that it was actually made up. It is uncertain how she came to adopt it, although some sources say a director chose it for her. She appeared in 1924/25 as part of a two-woman act called 'The Charming Sisters'. Autographed cards exist in Sweden on which her name appears as 'Lary Jana'.

The German dancer and actress Brunhilde Marie Alma Herta Jörns chose Laya Raki as her stage name in honour of La Jana and raki.

== Filmography ==
=== Silent films ===
- Ways to Strength and Beauty (1925, Germany)
- The White Geisha (1926, Danish/German)
- His English Wife (1927 Sweden/Germany)
- A Perfect Gentleman (1927, Sweden)
- Thérèse Raquin (1928, France/Germany)
- The Beaver Coat (1928, Germany)
- Two Red Roses (1928 Germany)
- Der Ladenprinz (1928, Germany)
- Gaunerliebchen (1928, Germany)
- Knights of the Night (1928, Germany)
- Der Herzensphotograph (1928, Germany)
- Spanisches Intermezzo (1929, Germany), short film
- Perjury (1929, Germany)
- The Merry Widower (1929, Germany)

=== Sound films ===
- The Warsaw Citadel (1930, Germany)
- The Schlemihl (1931, Germany)
- Ich bin Du (1934, Germany) Short film
- Truxa (1937, Germany)
- The Tiger of Eschnapur (1938, Germany)
- The Indian Tomb (1938, Germany)
- The Stars Shine (1938, Germany)
- Stars of Variety (1939, Germany)
- Der Trichter Nr. 10 (1940, Germany) Short film
- The Star of Rio (1940, Germany)

== Revues ==
- 1924 An und Aus (Berlin)
- 1927/28 Alles aus Liebe (Vienna)
- 1928 Helene (Berlin)
- 1928 Casanova (Berlin)
- 1928–1933 Die drei Musketiere (Berlin)
- 1930–1932 Die schöne Helena (Berlin)
- 1930–1932 Hoffmanns Erzählungen (Berlin)
- 1933 Casanova (Stockholm)
- 1934–1935 Streamline (Berlin, London, followed by English and Scottish tour)
- 1935 A Kingdom For A Cow (London)
- 1937 Piccadilly (Berlin)

== Sources ==
- Christa Bandmann. Es leuchten die Sterne. Aus der Glanzzeit des deutschen Films. Munich: Heyne, 1984. ISBN 3-453-01128-7 (in German)
- Helena Lehmann. La Jana. Eine Biografie. Self-published, Wiesbaden 2008. ISBN 978-3-00-020073-1 (in German)
- Rolf Weiser. "La Jana gestorben". Filmwelt 29 March 1940. (in German)
