= Johannisthal Studios =

Film studios in Berlin

The Johannisthal Studios were film studios located in the Berlin area of Johannisthal. Founded in 1920 on the site of a former airfield, they were a centre of production during the Weimar and Nazi eras. Nearly four hundred films were made at Johannistal during the silent period. The first production was the 1920 silent Verkommen starring Maria Zelenka. Sometimes known as the Jofa Studios, in 1929 they became the base of the newly established German major studio Tobis Film at the beginning of the sound era.

After 1945 the studios fell into the Soviet Zone of Germany, and later into the Communist state of East Germany. The studios were used by the new monopoly film company DEFA. Although the first postwar German film The Murderers Are Among Us was shot at Johannisthal, they were used less than the Babelsberg Studios in Potsdam. It was often used for dubbing foreign films into German for their release. From the 1960s East German television increasingly used the site. Following the fall of the Berlin Wall the studios were acquired by the Kirch Group, but were largely demolished by 1995.

== Bibliography ==
- Bergfelder, Tim. International Adventures: German Popular Cinema and European Co-Productions in the 1960s. Berghahn Books, 2005.
- Kreimeier, Klaus. The Ufa Story: A History of Germany's Greatest Film Company, 1918–1945.University of California Press, 1999.
