= Tobis Film =

German film company

- Type: Film production and distribution
- Industry: Film
- Founded: Late 1920s
- Defunct: 1942 (independent existence)
- Fate: Merged into a state-controlled industry
- Headquarters: Germany
- Parent: UFA GmbH

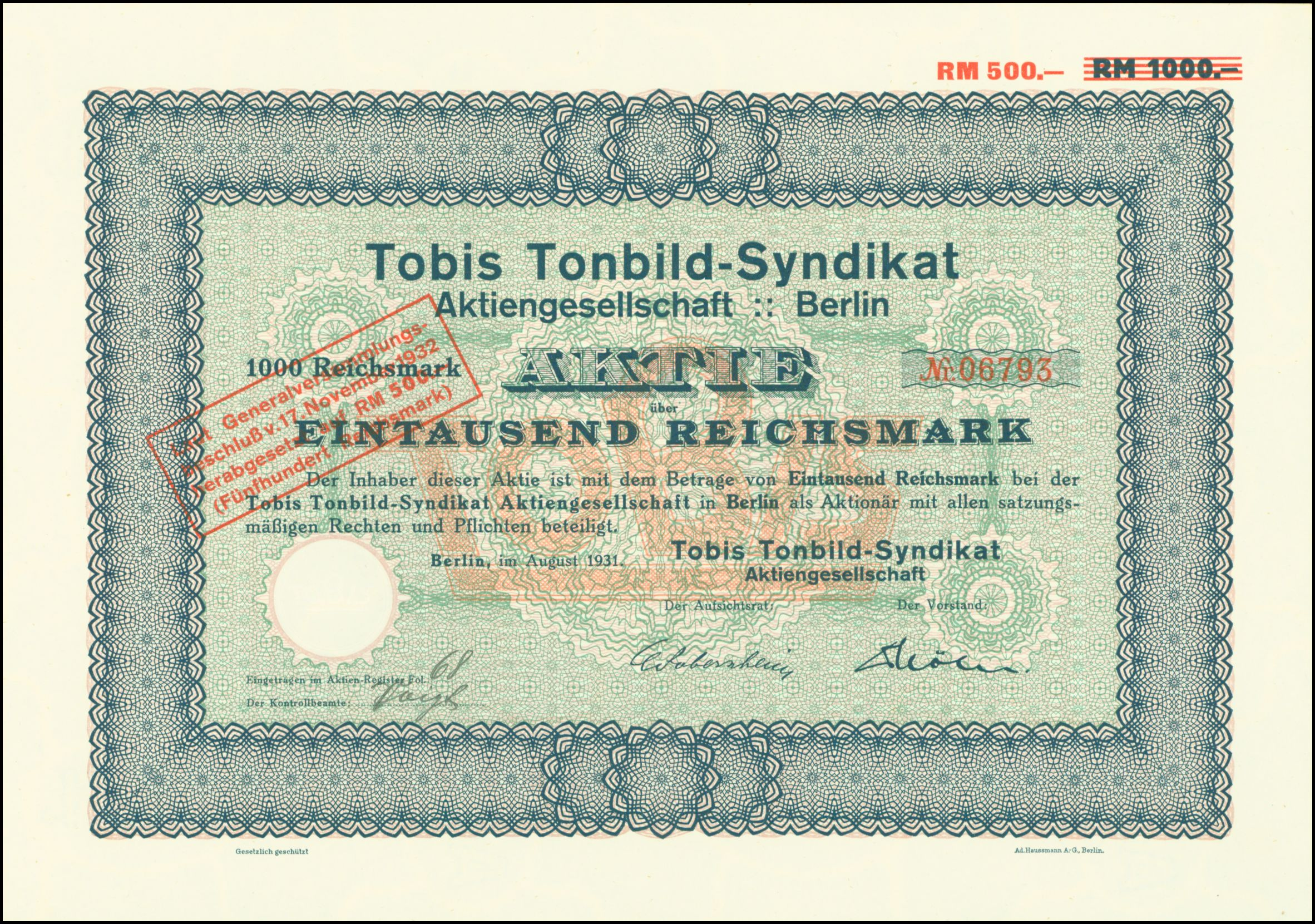
Share of the Tobis Tonbild-Syndikat AG, issued August 1931

Tobis Film was a German film production and film distribution company. Founded in the late 1920s as a merger of several companies involved in the switch from silent to sound films, the organisation emerged as a leading German sound studio. Tobis used the Tri-Ergon sound-on-film system under the Tobis-Klang trade name. The UFA production company had separate rights to the Tobis system, which it used under the trade name of Ufa-Klang. Some Tobis films were released in Germany by the subsidiary Europa Film.

Its principal production studios were the Johannisthal Studios in Berlin.

During the Nazi era, Tobis was one of the four major film companies along with Terra Film, Bavaria Film and UFA. In 1942 all these companies were merged into a single state-controlled industry bringing an end to Tobis' independent existence, though films continued to be released under the Tobis banner.

== International operations ==
From 1933 until 1938, Tobis controlled the dominant Austrian producer Sascha-Film which was known as Tobis-Sascha. From 1932, it also owned a majority share of one of the main Portuguese producers known as Tobis Portuguesa, a name which the company kept even after the German participation was terminated at the end of world War II.

Tobis established a Paris subsidiary and produced French-language film at the Epinay Studios during the 1930s. Among the directors under contract to the company was René Clair who produced the films Under the Roofs of Paris and Le Million during the early sound era.

== Legacy ==
One of the studio's employees Horst Wendlandt later (1971) founded a new distribution company which is also known as Tobis Entertainment. In 2016, the present-day Tobis became an investor in Globalgate Entertainment.

== Selected filmography ==
- Land Without Women (1929)
- Where the Lark Sings (1936)
- Adventure in Warsaw (1937)
- Truxa (1937)
- The Broken Jug (1937)
- The Gambler (1938)
- Wibbel the Tailor (1939)
- The Journey to Tilsit (1939)
- We Danced Around the World (1939)
- Renate in the Quartet (1939)
- Robert Koch (1939)
- The Fox of Glenarvon (1940)
- Falstaff in Vienna (1940)
- Trenck the Pandur (1940)
- Ohm Krüger (1941)
- Ferdinand the Ant (1944)
- Titanic (1943)
- Anna Alt (1945)
- The Years Pass (1945)

== Bibliography ==
- Bergfelder, Tim. International Adventures: German Popular Cinema and European Co-Productions in the 1960s. Berhahn Books, 2005.
- Ford, Fiona (2011). The film music of Edmund Meisel (1894–1930) (PDF) (PhD thesis). University of Nottingham.
- Gomery, Douglas (1976). "Tri-Ergon, Tobis-Klangfilm, and the Coming of Sound". Cinema Journal. 16 (1). University of Texas Press, on behalf of the Society for Cinema & Media Studies. JSTOR 1225449. (Restricted view, subscription needed)
- Kreimeier, Klaus. The Ufa Story: A History of Germany's Greatest Film Company, 1918-1945. University of California Press, 1999.
