= List of German films of 1942 =

German films released in 1942

This is a list of the most notable films produced in the Cinema of Germany in 1942.

== A–L ==
Title	Director	Cast	Genre	Notes
5 June	Fritz Kirchhoff	Carl Raddatz, Joachim Brennecke, Gisela Uhlen	War	Banned by Joseph Goebbels in November 1942 for unspecified reasons.
Andreas Schlüter	Herbert Maisch	Heinrich George		A film about the sculptor Andreas Schlüter; subliminal Nazi propaganda throughout.
Anuschka	Helmut Käutner	Hilde Krahl, Siegfried Breuer, Friedl Czepa	Drama	
Attack on Baku	Fritz Kirchhoff	Willy Fritsch, René Deltgen	Thriller	Anschlag auf Baku; anti-British propaganda.
Beloved World	Emil Burri	Brigitte Horney, Willy Fritsch	Musical/Comedy	
Between Heaven and Earth	Harald Braun	Werner Krauss, Gisela Uhlen	Historical drama	
The Big Game	Robert A. Stemmle	René Deltgen, Gustav Knuth	Sports	Das große Spiel; Some sequences of the film are in Agfacolor
Destiny	Géza von Bolváry	Heinrich George, Werner Hinz	Drama	
Diesel	Gerhard Lamprecht	Willy Birgel, Hilde Weissner	Biopic	
Doctor Crippen	Erich Engels	Rudolf Fernau, René Deltgen	Crime	
Die Entlassung	Wolfgang Liebeneiner	Emil Jannings, Theodor Loos, Karl Ludwig Diehl, Werner Hinz, Werner Krauss		The Dismissal; Sequel to Bismarck (1940)
Die goldene Stadt	Veit Harlan	Kristina Söderbaum, Eugen Klöpfer, Kurt Meisel, Rudolf Prack, Paul Klinger	Drama	The Golden City; in Agfacolor
Front Theatre	Arthur Maria Rabenalt	Heli Finkenzeller, René Deltgen, Lothar Firmans	Drama	
The Great King	Veit Harlan	Otto Gebühr, Gustav Fröhlich, Kristina Söderbaum, Paul Wegener	Historical Drama	Der große König; historical drama about King Frederick the Great of Prussia
The Great Love	Rolf Hansen	Zarah Leander, Viktor Staal, Grethe Weiser	Drama	Highest-grossing film of the Nazi era.
Himmelhunde	Roger von Norman	Malte Jaeger, Erik Schumann		Sky Dogs; about a young glider pilot who becomes a military pilot; targeted toward youths.
His Son	Peter Paul Brauer	Otto Wernicke, Rolf Weih, Karin Hardt	Drama	
The Little Residence	Hans H. Zerlett	Winnie Markus, Johannes Riemann, Fritz Odemar, Lil Dagover	Comedy	
Love Me	Harald Braun	Marika Rökk, Viktor Staal	Musical	

== L–M ==
Title	Director	Cast	Genre	Notes
Much Ado About Nixi	Erich Engel	Jenny Jugo, Albert Matterstock	Comedy	
My Friend Josephine	Hans H. Zerlett	Hilde Krahl, Paul Hubschmid, Fita Benkhoff	Comedy	
My Wife Theresa	Arthur Maria Rabenalt	Elfie Mayerhofer, Hans Söhnker		Comedy
The Night in Venice	Paul Verhoeven	Heidemarie Hatheyer, Lizzi Waldmüller, Hans Nielsen	Comedy	
The Old Boss	Peter Paul Brauer	Otto Wernicke, Hildegard Grethe, Werner Fuetterer	Comedy	
The Rainer Case	Paul Verhoeven	Luise Ullrich, Paul Hubschmid	Drama	
The Red Terror	Karl Ritter	Laura Solari, Will Quadflieg, Andrews Engelmann		GPU; Anti-Communism propaganda.
Rembrandt	Hans Steinhoff	Ewald Balser, Hertha Feiler, Gisela Uhlen		
Secret File W.B.1	Herbert Selpin	Alexander Golling, Richard Häussler, Herbert Hübner	Historical drama	
Seven Years of Good Luck	Ernst Marischka	Hans Moser, Wolf Albach-Retty	Comedy	
Sky Hounds	Roger von Norman	Malte Jaeger, Waldemar Leitgeb, Albert Florath	War drama	
The Sold Grandfather	Joe Stöckel	Josef Eichheim, Winnie Markus	Comedy	
The Thing About Styx	Karl Anton	Viktor de Kowa, Margit Symo, Laura Solari	Comedy/Crime	Die Sache mit Styx
To Be God One Time	Hans H. Zerlett	Hans Moser, Irene von Meyendorff, Lotte Lang	Comedy	
Two in a Big City	Volker von Collande	Claude Farell, Karl John	Romantic comedy	Zwei in einer großen Stadt
Vienna Blood	Willi Forst	Willy Fritsch, Maria Holst, Hans Moser, Theo Lingen	Musical comedy	Wiener Blut
Violanta	Paul May	Annelies Reinhold, Richard Häussler	Drama	
Voice of the Heart	Johannes Meyer	Marianne Hoppe, Ernst von Klipstein, Carl Kuhlmann	Drama	
We Make Music	Helmut Käutner	Ilse Werner, Viktor de Kowa	Musical comedy	Wir machen Musik
Wedding in Barenhof	Carl Froelich	Heinrich George, Paul Wegener, Ilse Werner		Hochzeit auf Bärenhof

== Documentaries and short films ==
Title	Director	Cast	Genre	Notes
Afrika Korps			Documentary	
Aus eins mach' vier	Wolfgang Staudte		Documentary	
Berlin – Wie es war			Documentary	Berlin the Way it Was; 87 min documentary about pre-war Berlin
Boote mit Flügeln	Nicholas Kaufmann		Documentary	14 min documentary
Deutsche Soldaten in Afrika	Hermann Schwenninger		Documentary	
Dr. Todt - Berufung und Werk				36 minute film about Dr. Fritz Todt
Dasein ohne Leben	Hermann Schwenninger		Documentary	
Eingeschneit in Lager IV	Ulrich K.T. Schultz		Documentary	
Entdeckungsfahrt im Rohr	Ulrich K.T. Schultz		Documentary	
Farne	Ulrich K.T. Schultz		Documentary	
Feldzug im Osten	Ulrich K.T. Schultz		Documentary	
Front am Himmel	Carl Otto Bartning, Karl-Ludwig Ruppel, Wilhelm Stöppler		Documentary	
Der Fuhrer und Sein Volk	Fritz Hippler		Documentary	
Geheimnisvolle Moorwelt	Ulrich K.T. Schultz		Documentary	
Heimliche Gäste in Wald und Flur	Ulrich K.T. Schultz		Documentary	
Die Herrin des Hofes	Andrew Thorndike		Documentary	
Heuzug im Allgäu	Wilhelm Prager		Documentary	
Der Jäger als Heger	Ulrich K.T. Schultz		Documentary	
John Bull in Nöten			animation	
Männer, Meer und Stürme. Ein Film von der Romantik und dem Leben an Bord eines Segelschiffes	Heinrich Hauser and Hubert Schonger			Men, Sea and Storm: A Film of the Romance and the Life Onboard a Segelship; 18 min documentary about Kriegsmarine
Märkische Fahrt	Kurt Rupli		Documentary	
Ostpreußens Küste am Meer	Ulrich K.T. Schultz		Documentary	
Pirsch unter Wasser	Rudolf Schaad		Documentary	
Rund um die Freiheitsstatue -- Ein Spaziergang durch die USA			propaganda documentary	Round the Statue of Liberty - A Walk through America Available online here
Die See ruft	Hans Fritz Köllner		Documentary	
Sprung in den Feind	Wilhelm Stöppler			22-minute propaganda film, showing the invasion of the Netherlands. The bridge of Moerdijk is taken with Fallschirmjäger.
Das tapfere Schneiderlein	Hubert Schonger	Hans Hessling		
