= Love Letters from Engadin =

1938 film

- Directed by: Luis Trenker; Werner Klingler
- Written by: Hanns Sassmann; Luis Trenker
- Produced by: Alf Teichs; Walter Tost; Luis Trenker
- Starring: Luis Trenker; Carla Rust; Erika von Thellmann
- Cinematography: Hans Ertl; Karl Puth; Walter Riml; Klaus von Rautenfeld
- Edited by: Waldemar Gaede
- Music by: Giuseppe Becce
- Production company: Luis Trenker-Film
- Distributed by: Terra Film
- Release date: 5 December 1938
- Running time: 95 minutes
- Country: Nazi Germany
- Language: German

Love Letters from Engadin or Love Letters from the Engadine (German: Liebesbriefe aus dem Engadin) is a 1938 German romantic comedy film directed by Luis Trenker and Werner Klingler and starring Trenker, Carla Rust and Erika von Thellmann. It contains elements of the mountain film genre for which Trenker was best known. It is set in London and in the Engadin valley in the Swiss Alps, where much of the location shooting took place. Interiors were shot at the Sievering and Schönbrunn Studios in Vienna, which had recently been annexed by Germany. The film's sets were designed by the art directors Fritz Maurischat and Arthur Schwarz. It was distributed by Terra Film.

== Synopsis ==
The manager of a ski resort decides to raise money by writing love letters on behalf of his popular ski instructor to various former pupils asking them to visit the resort again and donate to new facilities. This causes complications when one of his former students in London breaks off her engagement to an aristocrat, having discovered he is marrying her for her fortune, and travels out to Switzerland accompanied by a female friend.

== Main cast ==
- Luis Trenker as Toni Anewanter
- Carla Rust as Dorothy Baxter
- Erika von Thellmann as Anni Anewanter, Tonis Schwester
- Charlott Daudert as Constance Farrington
- Paul Heidemann as Lord Horace Baxter, Dorothys Vater
- Robert Dorsay as Jack, Kammerdienter
- Otto Wernicke as Thomas Viertinger, Hotelier
- Umberto Sacripante as Dr. Sacripanti
- Anton Pointner as Amtsrichter Rung

== Bibliography ==
- Höbusch, Harald (2016). Mountain of Destiny: Nanga Parbat and Its Path Into the German Imagination. Boydell & Brewer. ISBN 978-1-57113-958-0.
- Klaus, Ulrich J. Deutsche Tonfilme: Jahrgang 1938. Klaus-Archiv, 1988.
