= The Governor (1939 film) =

1939 film by Victor Tourjansky

- Directed by: Viktor Tourjansky
- Written by: Emmerich Groh (play); Emil Burri; Peter Francke
- Produced by: Hans Tost
- Starring: Brigitte Horney; Willy Birgel; Hannelore Schroth
- Cinematography: Konstantin Irmen-Tschet
- Edited by: Walter Fredersdorf
- Music by: Wolfgang Zeller
- Production company: Terra Film
- Distributed by: Terra Film
- Release date: 23 April 1939
- Running time: 99 minutes
- Country: Germany
- Language: German

The Governor (German: Der Gouverneur) is a 1939 German drama film directed by Viktor Tourjansky and starring Brigitte Horney, Willy Birgel and Hannelore Schroth. It is based on the play Die Fahne by Emmerich Groh. It was shot at the Babelsberg and Tempelhof Studios in Berlin and on location in East Prussia. The film's sets were designed by the art director Max Mellin. It was produced on a budget of 715,000 Reichsmarks.

== Synopsis ==
In a fictional Scandinavian country, a high-ranking military officer decides to overthrow Parliament. Salvation in the party turmoil is the military dictatorship under the resolute governor General Werkonen. The new deputy ensures that an assassination attempt is carried out on them. However, the general is only slightly injured when it is executed. The hired assassin now feels abandoned by his employer and takes revenge by killing him.

The suspicion of murder falls on the young guards officer, Lieutenant Robert Runeberg, the son of the former landowner, who probably had a motive because of the alleged forgery of his father's bills. And that very officer cannot reveal his alibi; because said alibi is a simultaneous conversation with his childhood friend Maria, the current wife of the military governor, and he doesn't want to compromise her. While everyone involved is still struggling with questions of conscience, the guards officer is about to grab his pistol and the governor is about to resign, the real murderer turns up in good time. With that, all honor and especially the honor of the body regiment is saved.

== Cast ==
- Brigitte Horney as Maria
- Willy Birgel as General Werkonen
- Hannelore Schroth as Ebba
- Ernst von Klipstein as Leutnant Robert Runeberg
- Rolf Weih as Leutnant Kalminen
- Walter Franck as Dr. Erko
- Paul Bildt as Gutsbesitzer Runeberg
- Lotte Spira as Frau Runeberg
- Werner Pledath as Oberst Wantua
- Albert Florath as Oberst Perkaulen
- Paul Otto as Ministerpräsident Lönnrot
- Ingolf Kuntze as Gutsbesitzer Maris
- Karl-Heinz Peters as Tom Lynge
- F.W. Schröder-Schrom as General Borgas
- Karl Meixner as Diener bei Dr. Erko
- Nicolas Koline as Jan, Koch in Marias Elternhaus
- Valy Arnheim as Diener bei General Werkonen
- Franz Arzdorf as Zivilist im Gefolge des Staatspräsidenten
- Charly Berger as Offizier im Gefolge
- Reinhold Bernt as Mitglied der Radikalen Partei
- Theo Brandt as Junger Offizier
- Fritz Eckert as Ein weiterer Offizier
- Max Harry Ernst as Parlamentsmitglied
- Charles Francois as Parlamentsmitglied
- Fred Goebel as Offizier der Polizeiwache
- Otto F. Henning as Stabsarzt
- Alfred Karen as Parlamentsmitglied
- Hans Kettler as Polizeikommissar am Tatort
- Otto Klopsch as Polizeikommissar
- Ida Krill as Küchenhilfe bei Maria
- Heinrich Marlow as Staatspräsident
- Max Mensing as Regierungsmitglied
- Klaus Pohl as Mann am Bahnhof, der sich eine Zigarette anzündet
- Georg A. Profé as Offizier
- Arthur Reinhardt as Limonadenverkäufer am Bahnsteig
- Ferdinand Robert as Gast beim Empfang des Gouverneurs
- Walter Schramm-Duncker as Gast auf Gut Marias
- Otz Tollen as Stabsoffizier des Fahnenregiments
- Elisabeth von Ruets as Gast beim Empfang des Gouverneurs
- Erich Walter as Polizeipräfekt
- Borwin Walth as Diener beim Empfang
- Eduard Wenck as Zeitschriftenverkäufer am Bahnsteig
- Kurt Wieschala as Regierungsmitglied

== Bibliography ==
- Waldman, Harry. Nazi Films in America, 1933–1942. McFarland, 2008.
