= Target in the Clouds =

- Directed by: Wolfgang Liebeneiner
- Written by: Hans Rabl (novel); Alf Teichs; Eberhard Frowein; Philipp Lothar Mayring
- Produced by: Alfred Greven; Hans Tost
- Starring: Albert Matterstock; Leny Marenbach; Brigitte Horney; Werner Fuetterer
- Cinematography: Hans Schneeberger; Eberhard von der Heyden
- Edited by: Helmuth Schönnenbeck
- Music by: Wolfgang Zeller
- Production company: Terra Film
- Distributed by: Terra Film
- Release date: 10 March 1939
- Running time: 99 minutes
- Country: Germany
- Language: German

Target in the Clouds (German: Ziel in den Wolken) is a 1939 German drama film directed by Wolfgang Liebeneiner and starring Albert Matterstock, Leny Marenbach and Brigitte Horney. It was based on a novel by Hans Rabl. The film portrays the struggles of the fictional German aviation pioneer Walter von Suhr, an officer in the pre-First World War German army who saw the potential for military aircraft.

The film's sets were designed by the art directors Otto Erdmann, Hans Sohnle and Wilhelm Vorwerg. It premiered at the Ufa-Palast am Zoo in Berlin.

== Cast ==
- Albert Matterstock as Walter von Suhr
- Leny Marenbach as Tilde von Gräwenitz
- Brigitte Horney as Margot Boje
- Werner Fuetterer as Dieter von Kamphausen
- Volker von Collande as Ewald Menzel
- Christian Kayßler as Krasselt
- Willi Rose as Lehmann
- Margarete Kupfer as Frau Menzel
- Gisela von Collande as Elsi Menzel
- Franz Weber as Herr von Suhr
- Gertrud de Lalsky as Frau von Suhr
- Liesl Eckardt as Frau Rühde, Magd auf dem Grävenitz-Gut
- Max Harry Ernst as Ein Gast im Lokal
- Paul Hildebrandt as Zuschauer bei der Flugvorführung
- Hans Junkermann as Leslie
- Malte Jäger as Der Offizier, der den Frau-Wirtin-Vers aufsagt
- Willy Kaiser-Heyl as Zuschauer bei der Flugvorführung
- Wilhelm P. Krüger as Der Dorfschullehrer
- Olga Limburg as Frau von Gräwenitz
- Kurt Mikulski as Ein französischer Flugzeugmonteur
- Hadrian Maria Netto as Oberst von Salis
- Joachim Rake as Der junge Adjutant des Hauptmann von Selbitz
- Heinrich Schroth as Hauptmann von Selbitz
- Else Valery as Die Besitzerin des Lokals
- Robert Vincenti-Lieffertz as Der Adjutant des Oberleutnants von Suhr
- Leopold von Ledebur as Ein Gast bei Grävenitz
- Michael von Newlinsky as Ein Zuschauer am Flugplatz
- Elsa Wagner as Tante Guste
- Hanns Waschatko as Dr. Karl Lanz, donator of the Lanzpreises
- Herbert Weissbach as Zuschauer bei der Flugvorführung
- Hans Grade as Hans Grade, winner of the Lanz Price

== Bibliography ==
- Paris, Michael. From the Wright Brothers to Top Gun: Aviation, Nationalism, and Popular Cinema. Manchester University Press, 1995.
