= Life Calls =

1944 film directed by Arthur Maria Rabenalt

- Directed by: Arthur Maria Rabenalt
- Written by: Otto Ernst Hesse
- Based on: Mutter Erde by Max Halbe
- Produced by: Walter Tost
- Starring: Sybille Schmitz; Paul Klinger; Elsa Wagner
- Cinematography: Igor Oberberg
- Edited by: Gertrud Hinz-Nischwitz
- Music by: Albert Fischer
- Production company: Terra Film
- Distributed by: Deutsche Filmvertriebs
- Release date: 20 December 1944
- Running time: 77 minutes
- Country: Germany
- Language: German

Life Calls (German: Das Leben ruft) is a 1944 German drama film directed by Arthur Maria Rabenalt and starring Sybille Schmitz, Paul Klinger and Elsa Wagner. It was based on the 1898 play Mutter Erde by Max Halbe. It was shot at the Babelsberg Studios in Berlin. Location shooting took place in Breslau in Silesia. The film's sets were designed by the art director Ernst H. Albrecht.

== Synopsis ==
After inheriting his father's farm estate in West Prussia, Paul Warkentin returns from Berlin to the countryside after many years away along with his wife Hella, to sell it. However he finds the terms of his inheritance do not allow this, while his wife strongly dislikes like the idea of living in the country. Further complications are added by Paul's childhood sweetheart Barbara.

== Cast ==
- Sybille Schmitz as Hella Warkentin
- Paul Klinger as Paul Warkentin
- Gerhild Weber as Barbara Tiedemann
- Elsa Wagner as Klara
- Paul Henckels as Kallenberg
- Arthur Schröder as Reschke
- Otto Wernicke as Der Vater
- Waltraut Hahne as Regine Tiedemann
- Willi Rose as Zindel
- Karl Hannemann as Herr Westphal
- Wolf Kaiser as Jürgen Tiedemann
- Eva Klein-Donath as Auguste Tiedemann
- Maria Litto as Eine Magd
- Marlise Ludwig as Frau Thiele
- Friedrich Petermann as Dr. Bodenstein
- Carl Heinz Peters as Herr Thiele
- Fred Roland as Knecht Victor
- Nico Turoff as Knecht Josef

== Bibliography ==
- Bock, Hans-Michael & Bergfelder, Tim. The Concise CineGraph. Encyclopedia of German Cinema. Berghahn Books, 2009.
- Goble, Alan. The Complete Index to Literary Sources in Film. Walter de Gruyter, 1999.
- Klaus, Ulrich J. Deutsche Tonfilme: Jahrgang 1944. Klaus-Archiv, 2006.
- Romani, Cinzia . Tainted Goddesses. Da Capo Press, 1992
