= Blondes for Export =

1950 film by Eugen York

- Directed by: Eugen York
- Written by: Norbert Jacques (novel)
- Produced by: Franz Tappers; Willi Wiesner
- Starring: Lotte Koch; Catja Görna; René Deltgen
- Cinematography: Oskar Schnirch
- Edited by: Walter Fredersdorf
- Music by: Wolfgang Zeller
- Production company: Standard-Filmverleih
- Distributed by: Lloyd Film
- Release date: 10 April 1950
- Running time: 81 minutes
- Country: West Germany
- Language: German

Blondes for Export (German: Export in Blond) is a 1950 West German crime thriller film directed by Eugen York and starring Lotte Koch, Catja Görna and René Deltgen. Norbert Jacques wrote the screenplay, adapting his own novel. It was shot at the Göttingen Studios and on location around Hamburg. The film's sets were designed by the art director Hans Ledersteger and Ernst Richter.

== Plot ==
In Hamburg during the late 1940s, a blonde young girl is kidnapped by human traffickers and taken to South America.

== Cast ==
- Lotte Koch as Yvonne Moréen
- Catja Görna as Iris Gorla
- René Deltgen as Frank Olman
- Albrecht Schoenhals as Gorla
- Peter van Eyck as Rolf Carste
- Ursula Grabley as Emmi Kruschke
- Ursula Herking as Fräulein Lührs
- Änne Bruck as Frau Hessling
- Carl-Heinz Schroth as Roschek
- Albert Florath as Professor
- Hans Leibelt as Intendant Hallerstedt
- Hans Richter as Artist Freddie
- Franz Schafheitlin as Polizeikommissar in Rio
- Josef Dahmen as Armand
- Peter Mosbacher as Alvaro
- Just Scheu as Direktor bei Lloyds
- Theo Pöppinghaus as Aldo
- Erich Weiher as Polizeibeamter
- Joachim Rake as Perreira
- Theo Tecklenburg as Südländer

== Production ==
The film is the second adaptation of the Luxembourgish 1927 novel Plüsch und Plümowski by Norbert Jacques, the first being the 1927 film The Bordello in Rio.

== Reception ==
A retrospective commentary from the Lexikon des internationalen Filmen finds the "theme (of human trafficking) treated in an unrealistic and cheap sensationalistic way."

== See also ==
White slavery was the subject of various films, including the following:

- White Cargo (1937)
- Cargaison blanche (1958)
- Final Destination: Red Lantern (1960)

== Bibliography ==
- Hans-Michael Bock and Tim Bergfelder. The Concise Cinegraph: An Encyclopedia of German Cinema. Berghahn Books, 2009.
- Thomas Elsaesser & Michael Wedel. The BFI companion to German cinema. British Film Institute, 1999.
