= Thunder, Lightning and Sunshine =

- German film poster
- German: Donner, Blitz und Sonnenschein
- Directed by: Erich Engels
- Written by: Max Neal (play); Max Ferner (play); Erich Engels
- Produced by: Erich Engels
- Starring: Karl Valentin; Liesl Karlstadt; Ilse Petri
- Cinematography: Edgar S. Ziesemer
- Edited by: Johanna Schmidt
- Music by: Werner Bochmann
- Production company: Neue Film Erich Engels
- Distributed by: Terra Film
- Release date: 22 December 1936
- Running time: 92 minutes
- Country: Germany
- Language: German

Thunder, Lightning and Sunshine (German: Donner, Blitz und Sonnenschein) is a 1936 German comedy film directed by Erich Engels and starring Karl Valentin, Liesl Karlstadt and Ilse Petri. The film's sets were designed by the art directors Paul Markwitz and Heinrich Richter. It was shot at Terra Film's Marienfelde Studios in Berlin.

== Cast ==
- Karl Valentin as Sebastian Huckebein, Master tailor
- Liesl Karlstadt as Barbara, his wife
- Ilse Petri as Evi, their daughter
- Reinhold Bernt as Franzl, Journeyman tailor
- Hans Leibelt as Jacob Greizinger
- Volker von Collande as Andreas, his son
- Albert Florath as Paul Huberding, Gastwirt
- Käthe Haack as Wally, his wife
- Käte Merk as Rosa, their niece
- Aribert Wäscher as Georg Sonnweber, dancing master
- Gerhard Bienert as engineer Poppe
- Martha Ziegler as Moni, Greizinger's economist
- Lucie Euler
- Hanni Weisse
- Rose Vollborn
- Gerti Ober
- Klaus Pohl
- Hanns Waschatko
- Hans Halden as Commissioner
- Karl Junge-Swinburne
- Walter Doerry
- Hans Weidecker and Sylvia Prillinger as dance couple
- Else Wunsch
