= Friedrich Schiller – The Triumph of a Genius =

1940 film

- Directed by: Herbert Maisch
- Screenplay by: Lotte Neumann (under the pseudonym C. H. Diller) and Walter Wassermann
- Based on: Passion by Norbert Jacques
- Starring: Horst Caspar; Heinrich George
- Music by: Herbert Windt
- Release date: 17 December 1940
- Running time: 98 minutes
- Country: Nazi Germany
- Language: German
- Budget: 1,935,000 ℛℳ
- Box office: 2.6 million ℛℳ

Friedrich Schiller – The Triumph of a Genius (German: Friedrich Schiller – Der Triumph eines Genies) is a 1940 German film, based on the novel Passion by Norbert Jacques. The film focuses on the early career of the German poet Friedrich Schiller.

The film was released in Italy under the title I masnadieri. It was also released in Sweden and Denmark.

== Cast ==
- Horst Caspar: Friedrich Schiller
- Hannelore Schroth: Laura Rieger
- Heinrich George: Duke Charles Eugene
- Lil Dagover: Countess Franziska von Hohenheim
- Eugen Klöpfer: Christian Friedrich Daniel Schubart
- Paul Dahlke: Sergeant Riess
- Paul Henckels: Hofmarschall von Silberkalb
- Herbert Hübner: General Rieger
- Dagny Servaes: Frau Rieger
- Hildegard Grethe: Elizabeth Schiller, Schillers Mutter
- Friedrich Kayßler: Johannes Kaspar Schiller, Schillers Vater
- Walter Franck: Fremder
- Hans Quest: Eleve Hoven
- Hans Nielsen: Georg Friedrich Scharffenstein
- Fritz Genschow: Eleve Karpff
- Franz Nicklisch: Eleve Petersen
- Ernst Schröder: Eleve Zumsteg
- Wolfgang Lukschy: Eleve Boigeol
- Just Scheu: Hauptmann der Militärakademie
- Günther Hadank: General Augé
- Hans Leibelt: Prof. Abel
- Ferdinand Terpe: Grand Duke's Court Chamberlain
- Heinz Welzel: Andreas Streicher
- Bernhard Minetti: Franz Moor
- Albert Florath: Pastor Moser
- Loriot: Page am Hof des Herzogs
- Edmund Lorenz: Schorsch Rieß

== Production ==
Friedrich Schiller cost 1,935,000 ℛℳ (equivalent to $8,564,587 in 2021) to produce.

== Release ==
Joseph Goebbels was concerned that audiences would not understand the propaganda in the film. The film was approved by the censors on 11 November 1940, and test showings were held in Stuttgart and Strasbourg on 13 November. It was successful and premiered at the Capitol am Zoo in Berlin on 17 December. It earned 2.6 million ℛℳ (equivalent to $11,507,972 in 2021) at the box office for a profit of 238,000 ℛℳ (equivalent to $1,053,422 in 2021).

== Works cited ==
- Welch, David (1983). Propaganda and the German Cinema: 1933-1945. I.B. Tauris. ISBN 9781860645204.
