= Five Million Look for an Heir =

1938 film directed by Carl Boese

- Directed by: Carl Boese
- Written by: Harald Baumgarten (novel); George Hurdalek; Jacob Geis
- Produced by: Hans Tost
- Starring: Heinz Rühmann; Leny Marenbach; Oskar Sima
- Cinematography: Ewald Daub
- Edited by: Gottlieb Madl
- Music by: Lothar Brühne
- Production company: Terra Film
- Distributed by: Terra Film
- Release date: 1 April 1938
- Running time: 85 minutes
- Country: Germany
- Language: German

Five Million Look for an Heir (German: Fünf Millionen suchen einen Erben) is a 1938 German comedy film directed by Carl Boese and starring Heinz Rühmann, Leny Marenbach and Oskar Sima. It was based on a novel by Harald Baumgarten. It was shot at the Halensee and Tempelhof Studios in Berlin. The film's sets were designed by the art directors Alfred Bütow and Willi Herrmann.

== Plot ==
The wealthy American uncle of vacuum cleaner salesman Peter Pett stipulated in his will that Peter may only inherit the five million dollars left to him if he is happily married. Otherwise, the five million should go to Peter's Scottish cousin Patrick.

Commissioned by the executor, Mister Blubberboom comes to Europe to determine if Peter is happy with his wife Hix. However, Blubberboom has a secret agenda. He takes Peter to New York without his wife and wants the beautiful Mabel to make an appearance as his wife there.

Patrick, who looks confusingly like his cousin, also wants the money. He pays a visit to Hix and travels with her to New York. The all converge on the Atlantic Hotel, initially without meeting face to face. There are confusing scenes, fuelled in no small measure by the extreme similarity between the two cousins. Eventually, Blubberboom reveals his criminal intentions and hides Hix to avoid meeting her husband. But when Hix and Peter finally meet and embrace, their obvious bliss wins them the inheritance. Patrick doesn't go away empty-handed either, having won Mabel's heart.

== Cast ==
- Heinz Rühmann as Peter Pett / Patrick Pett
- Leny Marenbach as Mabel
- Vera von Langen as Hix
- Oskar Sima as Blubberboom
- Heinz Salfner as Gould
- Olga Limburg as Vorstandsmitglied
- Claire Reigbert as Miss Hopkins, Vorstandsmitglied der Vereinigten Frauen- und Sittlichkeitsverbände
- Albert Florath as Mister Bucklespring
- Valy Arnheim as Mister Harris
- William Huch as Mister Kirkwood
- Anton Pointner as Hotelportier
- Otto Stoeckel as Arzt im Dachgarten
- Hermann Pfeiffer as Onkel Jim - NBC Radio-Reporter

== Bibliography ==
- Rentschler, Eric, ed. (2013). German Film and Literature. Routledge. ISBN 978-1-136-36873-8.
