= The Strange Woman (1939 film) =

1939 film

- Directed by: Roger von Norman
- Written by: Hjalmar Fries; Renate Uhl
- Based on: In Kemi lag das Hochzeitskleid by Hans Heise
- Produced by: Walter Tost
- Starring: Eugen Klöpfer; Elisabeth Reich; Elisabeth Wendt; Karl Dannemann
- Cinematography: E.W. Fiedler
- Edited by: Anna Höllering
- Music by: Wolfgang Zeller
- Production company: Terra Film
- Distributed by: Terra Film
- Release date: 1 September 1939
- Running time: 89 minutes
- Country: Germany
- Language: German

The Strange Woman (German: Die fremde Frau) is a 1939 German drama film directed by Roger von Norman and starring Eugen Klöpfer, Elisabeth Reich, Elisabeth Wendt and Karl Dannemann. It was shot at the Babelsberg Studios in Berlin and on location in the Gulf of Finland. The film's sets were designed by the art director Gustav A. Knauer.

== Cast ==
- Eugen Klöpfer as Hanno Kohlemainen
- Elisabeth Reich as Anne Matthies
- Elisabeth Wendt as Jouka
- Kurt Fischer-Fehling as Nils Lithberg, Steuermann
- Karl Dannemann as Kapitän Vaisänen
- Alexander Engel as Samuli
- Eduard Wenck as Paavi
- Eduard Wandrey as Pfarrer
- Lina Lossen as Hannos Mutter
- Axel Monjé as Ilmari
- Nicolas Koline as Taivu
- Wolfgang Staudte as Teini
- Marjan Lex as Junge mutter
- Hermann Pfeiffer as Sakuri, der Schiffskoch

== Bibliography ==
- Drewniak, Bogusław . Der Deutsche Film 1938-1945: ein Gesamtüberblick. Droste, 1987.
- Klaus, Ulrich J. Deutsche Tonfilme: Jahrgang 1939. Klaus-Archiv, 1988.
