= The Holm Murder Case =

1938 film

- Directed by: Erich Engels
- Written by: Georg C. Klaren; Ilse Paul-Czech
- Based on: Der Rote Faden by Axel Rudolf
- Produced by: Erich Engels; Fred Lyssa
- Starring: Ursula Deinert; Walter Steinbeck; Elisabeth Wendt
- Cinematography: Edgar S. Ziesemer
- Edited by: Walter Wischniewsky
- Music by: Nico Dostal
- Production company: Neue Film Erich Engels
- Distributed by: Terra Film
- Release date: 18 June 1938
- Running time: 91 minutes
- Country: Germany
- Language: German

The Holm Murder Case (German: Mordsache Holm) is a 1938 German mystery film directed by Erich Engels and starring Ursula Deinert, Walter Steinbeck and Elisabeth Wendt. It was shot at the Marienfelde Studios of Terra Film in Berlin and on location around the city. The film's sets were designed by the art directors Paul Markwitz and Otto Moldenhauer.

== Cast ==
- Ursula Deinert as Graciella Holm, Tänzerin
- Walter Steinbeck as Makler Nerger
- Elisabeth Wendt as Jenny Nerger, seine Frau
- Werner Scharf as Manuel Albano
- Harald Paulsen as Kriminalrat Wiegand
- Reinhold Bernt as Kriminalassistent Henneberg
- Kurt Waitzmann as Dr. Bernd Körner, Assessor
- Hans Leibelt as Kriminalkommissar Engel
- Hans Halder as Kriminalkommissar Dr. Sartorius
- Gerhard Bienert as Krim.Assistent bei Sartorius
- Viggo Larsen as Kriminalinspektor Haakonsen
- Kurt Wieschala as Kriminalbeamter
- Josef Sieber as August Schmoll
- Ellen Bang as Ida Ladosche, Halbweltdame
- Friedel Müller as Garderobiere
- Aribert Wäscher as Torben Jönssen, Reisender
- Bruno Ziener as Notar Bertelsen
- Hansjakob Gröblinghoff as Holger Runge
- Wolfgang Staudte as Agent
- Gerhard Dammann as Wirt im Bouillonkeller
- Edith Meinhard as Sängerin
- Maria Krahn as Frau Schmoll
- Oskar Höcker as Zeuge
- Charles Willy Kayser as Oberstaatsanwalt
- Karl Hannemann as Grenzbeamter
- Hans Mierendorff as Delogierter Hotelgast
- Curt Cappi as Zeuge
- Jac Diehl as Dänischer Kriminalbeamter

== Bibliography ==
- Garden, Ian. The Third Reich's Celluloid War. History Press, 2011.
- Klaus, Ulrich J. Deutsche Tonfilme: Jahrgang 1938. Klaus-Archiv, 1988.
