= White Slaves (film) =

- Poster for the film under the title Panzerkreuzer Sebastopol: "Weisse Sklaven"
- Directed by: Karl Anton
- Written by: Charlie Roellinghoff (factual report); Karl Anton (screenplay); Arthur Pohl (screenplay); Felix von Eckardt (screenplay)
- Produced by: Frank Clifford
- Starring: See below
- Cinematography: Herbert Körner
- Edited by: Ludolf Grisebach
- Music by: Peter Kreuder; Friedrich Schröder
- Release date: 1937
- Running time: 111 minutes (Germany)
- Country: Germany
- Language: German

White Slaves (German: Weisse Sklaven) is a 1937 German film directed by Karl Anton. It is also known by the longer title Panzerkreuzer Sebastopol: "Weisse Sklaven" (Battleship Sevastopol: "White Slaves") and was later re-released as Rote Bestien ("Red Beasts").

An anti-Soviet propaganda film from the Nazi era, set during the Russian Revolution, the film was designed as a response to Eisenstein's Battleship Potemkin.

== Plot summary ==
In St. Petersburg in 1917 revolution is brewing, but in more far-flung parts of Russia life is apparently carrying on as usual. At Sevastopol the officers on board a battleship are looking forward to its return to port when they will be allowed to fraternise with local girls. Kostja, one of the officers, is particularly excited. He is in love with Marija, the daughter of Sevastopol's Governor.

The deck of the ship is being prepared to become a dance-floor for a party. However, revolutionaries led by the Governor of Sevastopol's disloyal valet, Boris, plan to take over the vessel. They have infiltrated the ship's crew and are waiting for the upcoming party. When the unsuspecting guests arrive for the dance, the rebel crew surround and murder many of them with the now-unarmed officers. The mutineers also kill the loyal crew members. Kostja falls overboard after a struggle with a mutineer. The mutineers then turn the ship's guns on the town. The authorities are forced to surrender to the revolutionaries, who then indulge in an orgy of rape, murder and looting.

Marija and her parents have escaped from the battleship with the help of Kostja's loyal batman, Iwan. Her mother dies from wounds, but Marija and her father hide in a dockside tavern-cum-brothel run by Iwan's girlfriend Sinaida. The former Governor is a confused and broken man, unable to accept what has happened. Meanwhile, Boris is looking for Marija, for whom he has long had a hitherto hopeless desire. Now he wants her for himself. He tracks her down at the tavern. He reveals to her that he is the leader of the revolutionaries, and tells her of his desire for her, but says he only wants her if she agrees of her own free will.

After he leaves Marija gets a message from Kostja, who has survived. He is organising a counter-revolution. Boris lures Kostja into a trap and captures the leading counter-revolutionaries. However, Kostja later escapes. He and a group of supporters retake the battleship and launch a raid on the fortress in which the revolutionaries are holding the prisoners. Believing Kostja is still in captivity, Marija visits Boris to plead with him for Kostja's life. Drunk, Boris attempts to rape her, but Marija's father suddenly enters, kills Boris, and then collapses dead. In a battle between the revolutionaries and their opponents, the prisoners are freed and taken to the battleship. Before leaving port, they blow up the fortress, killing most of the revolutionaries. Marija and Kostja look back on the town, realising they must leave their country, but have the world before them.

== Production ==
The film was designed as an anti-Communist response to the famous Soviet film Battleship Potemkin (1925) by Sergei Eisenstein. It was initially given the working title Battleship Sevastopol. Das große Personenlexikon des Films says in its biography of the director, Karl Anton, that he "served up to the brownshirt rulers a clumsy anti-communist Nazi replica of the Soviet Russian-Revolution film Battleship Potemkin". The story was supposedly based on a factual report written by Charlie Roellinghoff. The film passed the censor on 16 December 1936, and was premiered on 5 January 1937.

The exterior filming took place in Yugoslavia and on the armored cruiser Dubrovnik. The set-designer was Erich Zander. Alfred Stoeger Anton was assistant director.

== Distribution ==
White Slaves was advertised as a "great documentary film from the Russia of the Kerensky revolution". It was very successful at the box office, and was shown up to August 1939 continuously in German cinemas. It was only withdrawn for political reasons as a result of the Nazi-Soviet Pact. After the German invasion of the Soviet Union in June 1941 White Slaves was once more shown in German theatres, this time under a new title, Red Beasts.

In the U.S., the film was released six months after it was first shown in Germany, under the title White Slaves.

== Cast ==
- Theodor Loos as The Governor
- Gabriele Hoffmann as Anastasia – his wife
- Camilla Horn as Marija – his daughter
- Karl John as Graf Kostja Wolfgoff
- Fritz Kampers as Iwan – his batman
- Werner Hinz as Boris – Valet to the Governor and leading revolutionary
- Herbert Spalke as Kurloff
- Alexander Engel as Turbin
- Willi Schur as Nikitin
- Agnes Straub as Sinaida – landlady of a dockside tavern
- Werner Pledath as Panin
- Hans Stiebner as The Commissar
- Hans Kettler as Refugee
- Albert Florath as Doctor
- Wilhelm P. Krüger as Drunkard
- Karl Meixner as Executioner
- Arthur Reinhardt as Radio Operator
- Emil Ludwig as First Officer
- Herbert Ebel as Young Officer
- Rio Nobile as Young Officer
- Rudolf Vones as Young Officer
- Anatol Losseff as Young Officer
- Walter Kuhle as Young Officer
- Wsevolod Kojine as Young Officer
- Grete Hartmann as Young Maiden
- Erika von Schaper as Young Maiden
- Gronau as Young Maiden
- Stadte as Young Maiden
- Nowak as Young Maiden
- Trude Hess as Young Maiden
- Edith Meinhard as Pianist
- Arthur Reppert as The Armenian
- Tatjana Sais as Singer
- Eberhard Leithoff as A thin man
- Erich Walter as A Tsarist general

== Soundtrack ==
- Camilla Horn – "Wenn die Sonne hinter den Dächern versinkt" (Music by Peter Kreuder, lyrics by Günther Schwenn)
- Camilla Horn – "Was du mir erzählt hast von Liebe und Treu'" (Music by Peter Kreuder, lyrics by Hans Fritz Beckmann)
