= Fruit in the Neighbour's Garden (1935 film) =

1935 film

- Directed by: Erich Engels
- Written by: Erich Engels; Reinhold Bernt; Gernot Bock-Stieber
- Produced by: Erich Engels
- Starring: Karl Valentin; Liesl Karlstadt; Adele Sandrock
- Cinematography: E.W. Feidler
- Edited by: René Métain; Axel von Werner
- Music by: Werner Bochmann
- Production company: Neue Film Erich Engels
- Distributed by: Terra Film
- Release date: 20 December 1935
- Running time: 89 minutes
- Country: Germany
- Language: German

Fruit in the Neighbour's Garden (German: Kirschen in Nachbars Garten) is a 1935 German comedy film directed by Erich Engels and starring Karl Valentin, Liesl Karlstadt and Adele Sandrock. It was shot at the Bavaria Studios in Munich with sets designed by the art directors Paul Markwitz and Heinrich Richter. Engels later remade the film in 1956.

== Plot ==
Hofrat Warrenheim, a passionate plant lover, moves with his daughter Hansi and his gardener Valentin, with the help of the chance acquaintance Theo, who is interested in Hansi, into the house next door to the animal lover Adele Hecht and her maid Lisl. According to Adele, this property was actually intended for her step-niece Irma and her potential fiancé Theo. They all get along quite well at the beginning, even play cards together and greet each other at breakfast outdoors. A neighborhood dispute begins when some of Warrenheim's plants are eaten by one of Adele's birds, allegedly a Siamese breeding duck which lays only one egg per year. Aggravation ensues when gardener Valentin picks up the duck's egg from the property line and serves it for breakfast. In the course of the dispute, insults are exchanged and they sue each other in court.

Hansi and Theo (who is actually supposed to be engaged to his cousin Irma according to the wishes of his aunt Adele), who have since become closer, are separated by a misunderstanding (his friend Gottfried had left Theo's motorbike without him to accompany Irma after a dance evening together borrowed knowledge and received a ticket). On the way to the atonement date through the local teacher, Theo learns about this motorcycle story.

The appointment, which was moved to the classroom because of the large number of witnesses, begins turbulently with mutual accusations. Theo can win back his Hansi through an unrelated contribution. When the lay judge seems desperate, the duck he has brought lays another egg, which is generally regarded as a miracle and contributes to the general reconciliation. Three couples leave the room: Adele and Warrenheim, Theo and Hansi, and Lisl and Valentin.

== Cast ==
- Adele Sandrock as Adele Hecht
- Theo Shall as Theo, ihr Neffe
- Liesl Karlstadt as Liesl, ihre Magd
- Max Gülstorff as Warrenheim, Hofrat a.D.
- Iris Arlan as Hansi, seine Tochter
- Karl Valentin as Valentin, sein Gärtner
- Reinhold Bernt as Gottfried Berger, Theos Freund
- Rotraut Richter as Irma Fiedler
- Albert Florath as Anton Huber, Lehrer
- Hedi Höpfner as Tanzpaar
- Margot Höpfner as Tanzpaar
- Victor Schamoni as Kind

== Bibliography ==
- Klaus, Ulrich J. Deutsche Tonfilme: Jahrgang 1933. Klaus-Archiv, 1988.
- Waldman, Harry (2008). Nazi Films in America, 1933–1942. McFarland. ISBN 978-0-7864-3861-7.
