= The Old Boss =

1942 film

- Directed by: Peter Paul Brauer
- Written by: Eberhard Keindorff; Wolf Neumeister
- Based on: Seine Majestät Gustav Krause by Erich Kästner
- Produced by: Alf Teichs; Walter Tost
- Starring: Otto Wernicke; Hildegard Grethe; Werner Fuetterer
- Cinematography: Robert Baberske
- Edited by: Ira Oberberg
- Music by: Hans Ebert
- Production company: Terra Film
- Distributed by: Deutsche Filmvertriebs
- Release date: 27 November 1942
- Running time: 83 minutes
- Country: Germany
- Language: German

The Old Boss (German: Der Seniorchef) is a 1942 German comedy film directed by Peter Paul Brauer and starring Otto Wernicke, Hildegard Grethe and Werner Fuetterer. It was shot at the Tempelhof Studios in Berlin and on location around Potsdam and Bad Wiessee in Bavaria. The film's sets were designed by the art directors Gerhard Ladner and Max Mellin.

== Cast ==
- Otto Wernicke as Georg von Schulte, Pferdezüchter
- Hildegard Grethe as Martha von Schulte
- Werner Fuetterer as Konrad von Schulte
- Heinz Welzel as Robert von Schulte
- Rolf Weih as Hermann von Schulte
- Karin Himboldt as Helene von Schulte
- Max Gülstorff as Ludwig Goerner
- Helmi Mareich as Margot Winkelmann
- Helmuth Helsig as Fritz Bodenstedt
- Jeanette Bethge as Emma
- Maria Litto as Lisbeth
- Leopold von Ledebur as Dr. Schneider
- Ernst Stimmel as Professor im Sanatorium
- Hilde Jansen as Hilde, Krankenschwester
- Lotte Rausch as Grete Nowak
- Karl Hannemann as Paul, Stallknecht
- Otto Braml as Oskar, Stallknecht
- Gunnar Möller as Willy, Stalljunge
- Günther Ballier as Loistelli
- Albert Florath as Pietsch, Droschkenkutscher
- Fanny Schrock-Normann as Frau Pietsch
- Oskar Höcker as Wendland, Pferdehändler
- Leo Peukert as Karsten, Pferdehändler

== Bibliography ==
- Bock, Hans-Michael & Bergfelder, Tim. The Concise CineGraph. Encyclopedia of German Cinema. Berghahn Books, 2009.
- Moeller, Felix. The Film Minister: Goebbels and the Cinema in the Third Reich. Edition Axel Menges, 2000.
