= In the Name of the People (1939 film) =

1939 film

- Directed by: Erich Engels
- Written by: Erich Engels; Walter Maisch
- Produced by: Alfred Greven; Hans Tost; Walter Tost
- Starring: Rudolf Fernau; Fritz Kampers; Rolf Weih
- Cinematography: Walter Riml
- Edited by: Anna Höllering
- Music by: Carl von Bazant
- Production company: Terra Film
- Distributed by: Terra Film
- Release date: 27 January 1939
- Running time: 85 minutes
- Country: Germany
- Language: German
- Budget: 410,000 Reichsmarks

In the Name of the People (German: Im Namen des Volkes) is a 1939 German crime film directed by Erich Engels and starring Rudolf Fernau, Fritz Kampers, and Rolf Weih. The film's sets were designed by the art directors Hans Sohnle and Wilhelm Vorwerg. It was shot at the Babelsberg Studios in Berlin.

== Synopsis ==
A dangerous criminal, just released from jail in England, goes on a violent spree robbing motorists on the roads of Bavaria.

== Cast ==
- Rudolf Fernau as Alfred Hübner
- Christine Grabe as Kellnerin Barbara
- Fritz Kampers as Fritz Hartmann
- Ellen Bang as Lola Larsen
- Rolf Weih as Kommissar Werner
- Reinhold Bernt as Bruno Mielke
- Ilse Fürstenberg as Else Hartmann
- Christian Gollong as Kriminalassistent Schmittchen
- Albert Florath as Gastwirt Buggisch
- Walter Steinbeck as Kriminalrat Brüning
- Franz Nicklisch as Franz Buggisch
- Rudolf Platte as Max
- Erich Dunskus as Kommissar Weber
- Aribert Grimmer as Ganove Oskar
- Eduard von Winterstein as Gerichtsvorsitzender
- Paul Mederow as Jurist
- Georg A. Profé as junger Mann
- Ethel Reschke as Begleiterin des jungen Mannes
- Oskar Höcker as Zuschauer bei Großrazzia
- Walter Gross as Egon
- Else Reval as Egons Beifahrerin
- Bruno Werner as Postbeamter
- Albert Venohr as Wachtmeister
- Berthold Ebbecke as Kriminalassistent
- Werner Pledath as Bayerischer Polizeibeamter
- Karl Münch as Polizeibeamter
- Walter Schramm-Duncker as Dealer Hulke
- Gerhard Dammann as Gastwirt Franz
- Lucie Euler as Zuschauerin bei Großrazzia
- Fred Goebel as Schupo
- Hansjakob Gröblinghoff as Mechaniker
- Knut Hartwig as Bayerischer Wachtmeister
- Otto F. Henning as Englischer Kriminalinspektor
- Käthe Jöken-König as Frau
- Willy Kaiser-Heyl as Amerikanischer Geschäftsmann
- Marianne Kiwitt as Bardame
- Otto Klopsch as Bayerischer Wachtmeister
- Otto Kronburger as Kriminalbeamter
- Gerda Kuffner as Zuschauerin bei Großrazzia
- Fred Köster as Assistant des Juristen
- Hans Meyer-Hanno as Wachtmeister

== Bibliography ==
- Bock, Hans-Michael; Bergfelder, Tim, eds. (2009). The Concise Cinegraph: Encyclopaedia of German Cinema. New York: Berghahn Books. ISBN 978-1-57181-655-9.
