= The Waitress Anna =

1941 film

- Directed by: Peter Paul Brauer
- Written by: Peter Paul Brauer; Friedrich Forster-Burggraf
- Based on: The Waitress Anna by Ursula Bloy and Wolf Neumeister
- Produced by: Viktor von Struwe
- Starring: Franziska Kinz; Elfriede Datzig; Hermann Brix; Winnie Markus
- Cinematography: Jan Roth
- Edited by: Alexandra Anatra
- Music by: Wolfgang Zeller
- Production company: Terra Film
- Distributed by: Terra Film
- Release date: 22 October 1941
- Running time: 99 minutes
- Country: Germany
- Language: German

The Waitress Anna (German: Die Kellnerin Anna) is a 1941 German drama film directed by Peter Paul Brauer and starring Franziska Kinz, Elfriede Datzig, Hermann Brix and Winnie Markus. It was shot at the Hostivar Studios in Prague and on location around Salzburg. The film's sets were designed by the art directors Gustav A. Knauer and Artur Schwarz.

== Synopsis ==
Against his father's wishes Stefan heads to Salzburg to study at the Conservatory on a scholarship there, which his girlfriend Veronika also attends. He lives a carefree life of enjoyment, but is taken under her wing by Anna a slightly older waitress who works in a bare frequented by the musicians. Eventually she goes to effect a reconciliation with Stefan's father on the boy's behalf, revealing in the process that she is his mother from a fling long-ago. She eventually persuades him to give his blessing to his son's career in music.

== Cast ==
- Franziska Kinz as Anna Rottner
- Elfriede Datzig as Veronika
- Hermann Brix as Stefan
- Winnie Markus as Marina
- Theodor Danegger as Orgelbauer
- Paul Dahlke as Malwoda
- Hans Olden as Styr, Bildhauer
- Gustav Waldau as Gschwendtner
- Otto Wernicke as Ludwig Burgstaller
- Fritzi Eckemer as Franzi
- Maria Loja as Frau Schmidt
- Maria Seidler as Frau Kruse
- Wilma Tatzel as Rosl, Modell
- Elsa Wagner as Mathilde Noack
- Martha Ziegler as Angerle
- Vera Complojer as Kellnerin Sophie
- Walter Janssen as Prof. Georgi
- Eduard Bornträger as Prokurist Poinetsberger
- Karl Günther as Stadtbaurat Stirner
- Bruno Hübner as Angestellter im Altersheim

== Bibliography ==
- Heins, Laura. Nazi Film Melodrama. University of Illinois Press, 2013.
- Klaus, Ulrich J. Deutsche Tonfilme: Jahrgang 1940. Klaus-Archiv, 1988.
