= Alarm at Station III =

1939 film

- Directed by: Philipp Lothar Mayring
- Written by: Philipp Lothar Mayring
- Produced by: Alf Teichs; Walter Tost
- Starring: Gustav Fröhlich; Jutta Freybe; Kirsten Heiberg
- Cinematography: Walter Riml
- Edited by: Alexandra Anatra
- Music by: Franz Grothe
- Production company: Terra Film
- Distributed by: Terra Film
- Release date: 10 November 1939
- Running time: 96 minutes
- Country: Germany
- Language: German

Alarm at Station III (German: Alarm auf Station III) is a 1939 German crime film directed by Philipp Lothar Mayring and starring Gustav Fröhlich, Jutta Freybe and Kirsten Heiberg. It is set in a Scandinavian country with Prohibition.

The film's sets were designed by the art director Ernst H. Albrecht.

== Partial cast ==
- Gustav Fröhlich as Arne Kolk, Zollwachtmeister
- Jutta Freybe as Elga Dohnert, Braut von Arne Kolk
- Kirsten Heiberg as Kaja, Chansonette
- Walter Franck as Dr. Talverson, Vorsitzender des Prohibitionsvereins
- Berta Drews as Frauke, Frau von Thomas Kolk
- Karl Dannemann as Thomas Kolk
- Hermann Brix as Axel, Sohn von Dr. Talverson
- Aribert Wäscher as Mister Fields, Krimminalkommissar aus Amerika
- Hans Nielsen as Hauptmann Karsten
- Hermann Speelmans as Ströhm, Zollpolizist
- Willi Rose as Bing, Zollpolizist
- Rolf Weih as Dahl, Zollpolizist
- Erik Ode as Egge, Zollpolizist
- Albert Florath as Kommissar Kalmi
- Hans Stiebner as Soot, Schmuggler
- Paul Bildt as Polizeiarzt
- Albert Lippert as Hendrik, Geschäftsführer in der "Teestube"
- Reinhold Bernt as Kai, Schmuggler, Kajas Bruder
- Karl-Heinz Peters as Nikko, Schmuggler
- Wolf Ackva as Holt, Zollpolizist
- Werner Schott as Polizeipräsident
- Rudolf Schündler as Inspektor Henning
- Hermann Pfeiffer as Sörensen, Mitglied des Prohibitionsvereins
- Josefine Dora as Mutter Galen, Cafébesitzerin
- Ewald Wenck as Sergant Galen, Polizeischreiber, Mann v. Frau Galen
- Walter Bechmann as Diener bei Dr. Talverson
- Tina Eilers as Krankenschwester beim Polizeiarzt
- Nicolas Koline as Verhafteter vor dem Polizeigericht
- Klaus Pohl as Lagerverwalter der Allgemeinen Brennstoff A.G.
- Gisela Scholz as Tochter Thomas Kolks
- Peter Dann as Sohn Thomas Kolks

== Bibliography ==
- Bock, Hans-Michael; Bergfelder, Tim, eds. (2009). The Concise Cinegraph: Encyclopaedia of German Cinema. New York: Berghahn Books. ISBN 978-1-57181-655-9.
