= Alf Teichs =

German screenwriter and film producer (1904–1992)

- Born: 18 December 1904; Dresden, Saxony; German Empire
- Died: 14 January 1992 (aged 87); Heidelberg, Baden-Württemberg; Germany
- Occupations: Producer; Screenwriter
- Years active: 1936-1976

Alf Teichs (1904–1992) was a German screenwriter and film producer. During the Nazi era, Teichs was head of production at Terra Film. After the Second World War, Teichs set up Comedia-Film with the comedian Heinz Rühmann.

== Selected filmography ==
=== Producer ===
- Comrades at Sea (1938)
- Alarm at Station III (1939)
- Roses in Tyrol (1940)
- Doctor Crippen (1942)
- The Old Boss (1942)
- His Son (1942)
- Circus Renz (1943)
- Die Fledermaus (1946)
- Martina (1949)
- I'll Make You Happy (1949)
- The Secret of the Red Cat (1949)
- Spy for Germany (1956)
- Winter in the Woods (1956)
- Devil in Silk (1956)
- Jons und Erdme (1959)
- Stalingrad (1959)
- The High Life (1960)
- I'm Marrying the Director (1960)
- The Cry of the Wild Geese (1961)
- The Transport (1961)

=== Screenwriter ===
- Paul and Pauline (1936)
- Stjenka Rasin (1936)
- Target in the Clouds (1939)
- Midsummer Night's Fire (1939)
- The Murder Trial of Doctor Jordan (1949)
- Guitars of Love (1954)
- A Heart Full of Music (1955)
- The First Day of Spring (1956)

== Bibliography ==
- Bock, Hans-Michael & Bergfelder, Tim. The Concise CineGraph. Encyclopedia of German Cinema. Berghahn Books, 2009.
