= Walter Tost =

German film producer and production manager

- Born: 30 March 1895; Berlin, Prussia, German Empire
- Died: 28 December 1948 (aged 53); Berlin, Germany
- Occupations: Producer, Actor
- Years active: 1921-1945 (film)

Walter Tost (1895-1948) was a German film producer and production manager. Much of his work was with Terra Film during the Nazi era. He was the elder brother of Hans Tost, also a film producer.

== Selected filmography ==
- The Woman Everyone Loves Is You (1929)
- Two Lucky Days (1932)
- You and I (1938)
- Monika (1938)
- Love Letters from Engadin (1938)
- In the Name of the People (1939)
- Men Are That Way (1939)
- The Strange Woman (1939)
- Alarm at Station III (1939)
- The Old Boss (1942)
- His Son (1942)
- Love Premiere (1943)
- Life Calls (1944)

== Bibliography ==
- Giesen, Rolf. Nazi Propaganda Films: A History and Filmography. McFarland, 2003.
