= Hans Tost =

- Born: 15 August 1907; Berlin, Prussia, German Empire
- Died: 31 August 1958 (aged 51); Grünwald, Bavaria, West Germany
- Occupations: Producer, actor
- Years active: 1927–1956 (film)

Hans Tost (1907–1958) was a German film producer and occasional actor. He headed his own production unit at Terra Film during the Nazi era. He was the younger brother of Walter Tost, also a film producer.

== Selected filmography ==
=== Actor ===
- The Marriage Nest (1927)
- Three Days of Life and Death (1929)
- Student Life in Merry Springtime (1931)

=== Producer ===
- Five Million Look for an Heir (1938)
- Thirteen Chairs (1938)
- Target in the Clouds (1939)
- In the Name of the People (1939)
- The Governor (1939)
- Woman Made to Measure (1940)
- Goodbye, Franziska (1941)
- Beloved Darling (1943)
- Große Freiheit Nr. 7 (1944)
- The Disturbed Wedding Night (1950)
- White Shadows (1951)
- The Lady in Black (1951)
- Bonjour Kathrin (1956)

== Bibliography ==
- Henry Nicolella. Frank Wisbar: The Director of Ferryman Maria, from Germany to America and Back. McFarland, 2018.
