= Norbert Jacques =

Luxembourgish novelist

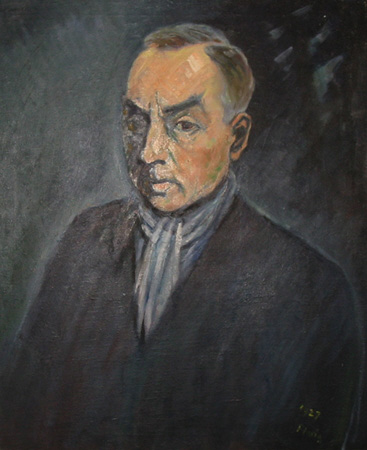
- Born: 6 June 1880; Luxembourg-Eich, Luxembourg
- Died: 15 May 1954 (aged 73); Koblenz, West Germany
- Occupations: Novelist, journalist, screenwriter, translator
- Years active: 1901–1954

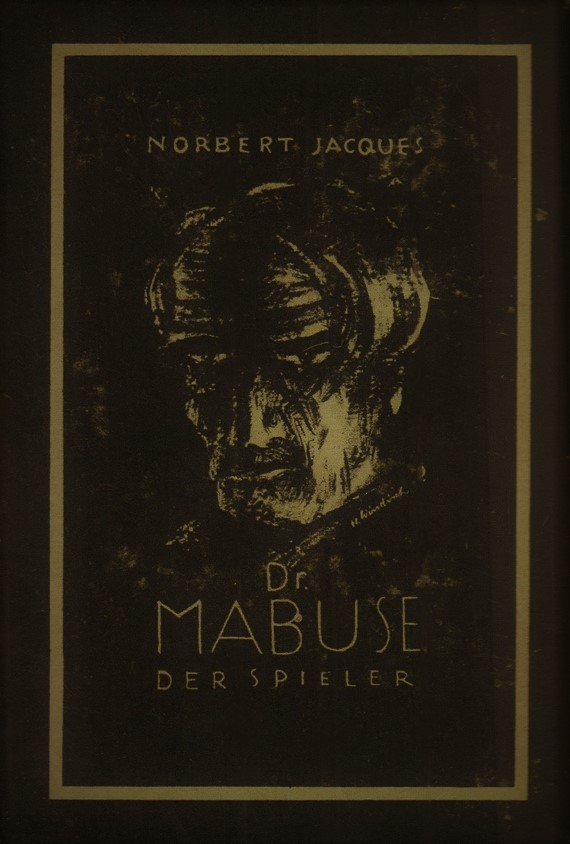
Dr. Mabuse by Norbert Jacques.

Norbert Jacques (6 June 1880 – 15 May 1954) was a Luxembourgish novelist, journalist, screenwriter, and translator who wrote in German. He was born in Luxembourg-Eich, Luxembourg and died in Koblenz, West Germany. He created the character Dr. Mabuse, who was a feature of some of his novels. Dr. Mabuse, der Spieler, the first novel to feature Mabuse, was one of the bestsellers of its time; it sold over 500,000 copies in Germany. Today, Jacques is known best for Dr. Mabuse. In 1922, he received German citizenship.

== Bibliography ==
=== Novels ===
- Dr. Mabuse, der Spieler (1921)
- Ingenieur Mars (1923)
- Mensch gegen Mensch (1924)
- Plüsch und Plümowski (1927)
- Mabuses Kolonie (1930, fragment) – Never finished. First published in 1994.
- Das Testament des Dr. Mabuse (1932) – First published in 1950 under the title Dr. Mabuses letztes Spiel. In the late 1980s, it was reprinted under its original title.
- Chemiker Null (1934) – Serialized in 1934. First reprinted in a book in 1994.
- Leidenschaft: Ein Schiller-Roman (1939)

=== Short stories ===
- "Dr. Mabuse auf dem Presseball" (1923)

=== Translations ===
- Maurice Renard - Les Mains d'Orlac. Published in German as Orlac’s Hände (1922).
- Rudyard Kipling - Stalky & Co. Published in German as Staaks und Genossen (1928).
- Rudyard Kipling - Captains Courageous. Published in German as Fischerjungs: Ein Seeroman (1930).
- Hugh Walpole - Jeremy at Crale. Published in German as Jeremy auf der Schule (1931).

== Selected filmography ==
- Dr. Mabuse the Gambler (1922) – Adaptation of Dr. Mabuse, der Spieler.
- Man Against Man (1924) – Adaptation of Mensch gegen Mensch. Screenplay written by Jacques.
- The Bordello in Rio (1927) – Adaptation of Plüsch und Plümowski.
- The Testament of Dr. Mabuse (1933)
- Friedrich Schiller – The Triumph of a Genius (1940) – Adaptation of Leidenschaft: Ein Schiller-Roman.
- Blondes for Export (1950) – Adaptation of Plüsch und Plümowski. Screenplay written by Jacques.
- Final Destination: Red Lantern (1960) – Adaptation of Plüsch und Plümowski.
- The Thousand Eyes of Dr. Mabuse (1960) – Based on characters created by Jacques.
- The Return of Doctor Mabuse (1961) – Based on characters created by Jacques.
- The Testament of Dr. Mabuse (1962) – Remake of the 1933 film.
- The Invisible Dr. Mabuse (1962)
- Scotland Yard Hunts Dr. Mabuse (1963) – Based on characters created by Jacques.
- The Secret of Dr. Mabuse (1964) a.k.a. The Death Ray of Dr. Mabuse – Based on characters created by Jacques.
- The Vengeance of Dr. Mabuse (1971) - Spanish film directed by Jesus Franco
- Dr. M (1990) – Adaptation of Dr. Mabuse, der Spieler.
