= Ursula Deinert =

German dancer and actress

- Born: 17 October 1910; Berlin; German Empire
- Died: 21 December 1988 (aged 78); East Berlin; East Germany
- Occupations: Film actress, Dancer

Ursula Deinert (17 October 1910 – 21 December 1988) was a German dancer and film actress.

== Selected filmography ==
- Woman's Love—Woman's Suffering (1937)
- Nanon (1938)
- The Holm Murder Case (1938)
- Capriccio (1938)
- Robert and Bertram (1939)
- Brand im Ozean (1939)
- Woman at the Wheel (1939)
- My Aunt, Your Aunt (1939)
- The Rothschilds (1940)
- Jud Süß (1940)
- Sonntagskinder (1941)
- Pedro Will Hang (1941)

== Bibliography ==
- O'Brien, Mary-Elizabeth. Nazi Cinema as Enchantment: The Politics of Entertainment in the Third Reich. Camden House, 2006. ISBN 978-1-57113-334-2.
