= Hanns Sassmann =

Austrian playwright, journalist and screenwriter

- Born: 17 December 1882; Vienna, Austro-Hungarian Empire
- Died: 8 May 1944 (aged 61); Kufstein, Austria
- Occupation: Writer
- Years active: 1933–1941 (film)

Hanns Sassmann (1882–1944) was an Austrian playwright, journalist and screenwriter. He was active in both German and Austrian cinema during the Nazi era.

== Selected filmography ==
- Grand Duchess Alexandra (1933)
- Circus Saran (1935)
- A Hoax (1936)
- The Fairy Doll (1936)
- The Cabbie's Song (1936)
- Three Girls for Schubert (1936)
- Love Letters from Engadin (1938)
- The Fire Devil (1940)
- Lightning Around Barbara (1941)

== Bibliography ==
- Giesen, Rolf. Nazi Propaganda Films: A History and Filmography. McFarland, 2003.
- Von Dassanowsky, Robert. Screening Transcendence: Film Under Austrofascism and the Hollywood Hope, 1933–1938. Indiana University Press, 2018
