= Reinhold Bernt =

German actor (1902–1981)

Reinhold Bernt as a clown in The Blue Angel (1930)

Reinhold Bernt (19 December 1902 – 26 October 1981) was a German film actor.

Bernt was born Reinhold Bienert in Berlin and died in West Berlin. He was the brother of actor Gerhard Bienert (1898 – 1986).

== Career ==
Bernt's acting career began in Stuttgart with a theater debut. Soon after, he traveled to Berlin. There, he founded a troupe known as the "Group of Young Actors" with his brother, Gerhard Bernt. He performed across Berlin and entered the film industry in the 1930s. He was not only an actor, but also an assistant director and screenwriter. He appeared in some Nazi propaganda films, such as Im Namen des Volkes (In the Name of the People). After World War II, he performed at the Schillertheater and in Deutsche Film-Aktiengesellschaft (DEFA). It became harder to obtain large roles, so he began to act increasingly as supporting characters. eventually, he moved on to voicing radio plays, performing a total of 320 roles. He died on October 26, 1981, in Berlin.

== Selected filmography ==
- The Blue Angel (1930) - Der Clown / The Clown
- Salto Mortale (1931) - Jim
- The Other Side (1931) - Feldwebel
- The Daredevil (1931) - Willy, Stallmeister American Hyppodrom
- Cadets (1931) - Hennig, Bursche bei Rittmeister von Malzahn
- Secret Agent (1932) - Baschin
- Peter Voss, Thief of Millions (1932) - Zeitungsverkäufer
- Cavaliers of the Kurfürstendamm (1932) - Gorritz
- Spies at the Savoy Hotel (1932) - Schrott, sein Sekretär
- Secret of the Blue Room (1932) - Chauffeur Max
- Sacred Waters (1932) - Töni
- The Rebel (1932) - Krahvogel
- Hände aus dem Dunkel (1933) - Schnabel, ein entlassener Angestellter
- The Roberts Case (1933)
- The Rebel (1933) - George Bird
- Hitlerjunge Quex (1933) - Ausrufer (barker) (uncredited)
- Lady Windermere's Fan (1935) - Regisseur
- Trouble Backstairs (1935) - August Krüger, Hausverwalter
- Fruit in the Neighbour's Garden (1935) - Gottfried Berger, Theos Freund
- The Beggar Student (1936) - Der Pedell
- Escapade (1936) - Prowiak, ein Friseur
- Thunder, Lightning and Sunshine (1936) - Franzl, Schneidergeselle
- Under Blazing Heavens (1936) - 1. Offizier auf der Gorboduc
- Truxa (1937) - Gepäckträger (uncredited)
- Sherlock Holmes (1937) - Wilson
- Hahn im Korb (1937) - Hotelportier
- The Mystery of Betty Bonn (1938) - Matrose Clements
- Comrades at Sea (1938) - Kommissar Sakin
- The Holm Murder Case (1938) - Kriminalassistent Henneberg
- In the Name of the People (1939) - Bruno Mielke
- Der grüne Kaiser (1939) - (uncredited)
- The Governor (1939) - Mitglied der Radikalen Partei
- Mistake of the Heart (1939) - Dr. Reithofer
- Central Rio (1939) - Sergeant Carmo
- Alarm at Station III (1939) - Kai, Schmuggler
- Jud Süß (1940) - Folterknecht
- Wunschkonzert (1940)
- Blutsbrüderschaft (1941) - Arbeiter der Gösch
- Das himmelblaue Abendkleid (1941)
- Alarm (1941) - Wirt im Lokal
- Unser kleiner Junge (1941) - Swoboda
- Carl Peters (1941) - Jungle Patrolman Hansen
- Leichte Muse (1941) - Kaufmann Böhlke
- People in the Storm (1941) - Johann
- His Son (1942) - Heini - Komplize des 'eleganten' Diebs
- ... und über uns der Himmel (1947)
- The Berliner (1948) - (uncredited)
- Rotation (1949) - Kurt Blank
- Bürgermeister Anna (1950) - Landrat
- Semmelweis - Retter der Mütter (1950)
- Die Jungen vom Kranichsee (1950) - Fabrikdirektor
- Master of Life and Death (1955) - Bahnwärter
- The Story of Anastasia (1956) - Oberwachtmeister Schröder (uncredited)
- Spy for Germany (1956) - U-Boot-Steuermann
- Madeleine und der Legionär (1958)
- Arzt ohne Gewissen (1959) - Hauptwachtmeister
- Two Among Millions (1961) - Schliemke
- Destination Death (1964) - Willi Wirth

== Bibliography ==
- Kosta, Barbara. Willing Seduction: The Blue Angel, Marlene Dietrich, and Mass Culture. Berghahn Books, 2009.
- St. Pierre, Paul Matthew. E.A. Dupont and his Contribution to British Film: Varieté, Moulin Rouge, Piccadilly, Atlantic, Two Worlds, Cape Forlorn. Fairleigh Dickinson University Press, 2010.
