= Maria Landrock =

German actress (1923–1992)

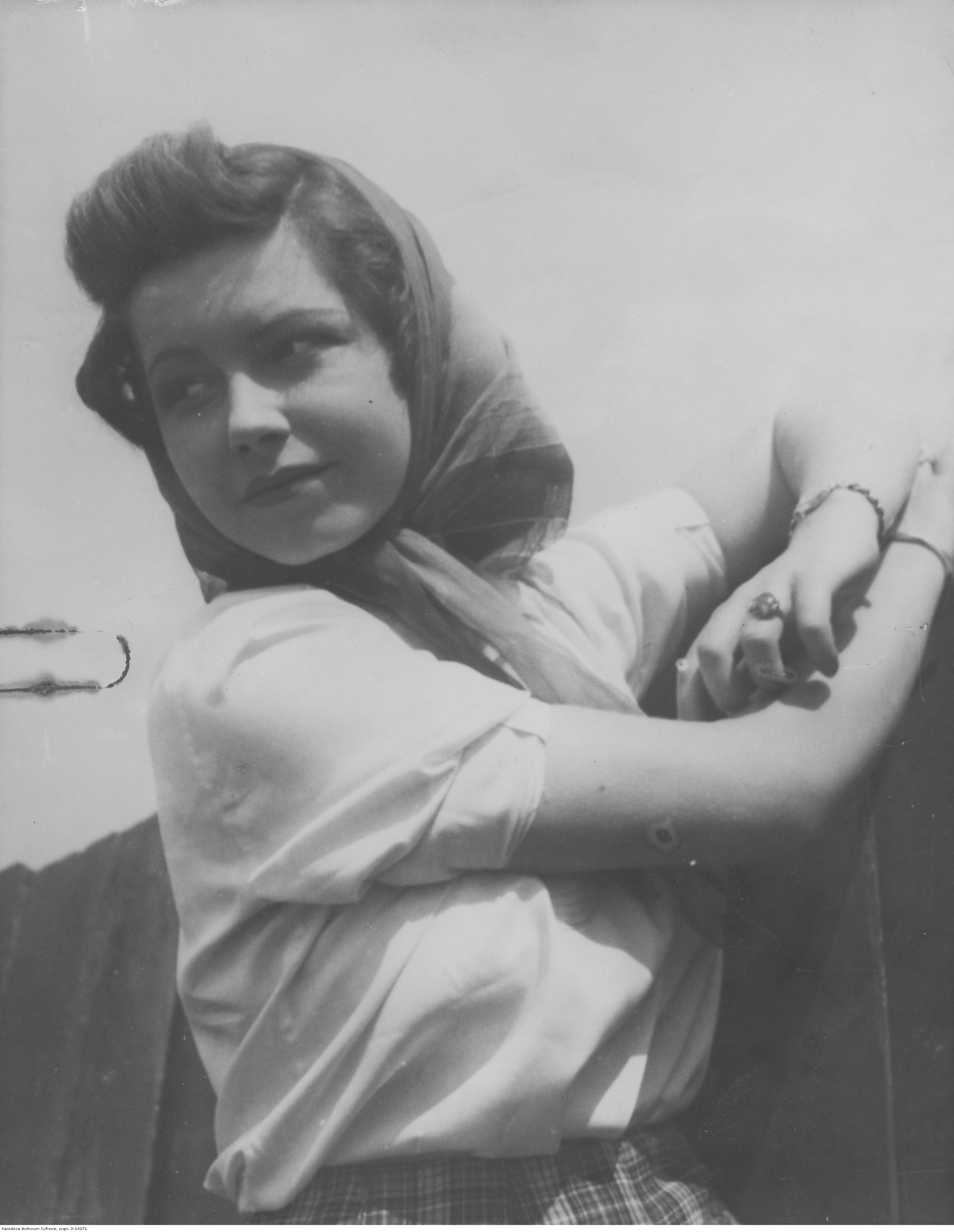
- Born: 3 July 1923; Köpenick, Berlin, Germany
- Died: 1992 (aged 68–69); Garmisch-Partenkirchen, Bavaria, Germany
- Other name: Maria Johanna Elisabeth Landrock
- Occupation: Actress
- Years active: 1940-1982 (film & TV)

Maria Landrock (1923–1992) was a German film and television actress.

On July 18, 1944, a concert was organized for the SS garrison members of the Auschwitz Concentration and Death Camp in the SS kitchen and canteen near the Auschwitz I main camp where Landrock and her band were the guest stars for the evening.

== Selected filmography ==
- Pedro Will Hang (1942)
- An Old Heart Becomes Young Again (1943)

== Bibliography ==
- Noack, Frank. Veit Harlan: The Life and Work of a Nazi Filmmaker. University Press of Kentucky, 2016.
