= A Cheerful House =

1944 film directed by Johannes Guter

- Directed by: Johannes Guter
- Written by: Johannes Guter; Jochen Kuhlmey; Max Pfeiffer
- Produced by: Erich Holder
- Starring: Carla Rust; Rolf Weih; Hans Leibelt; Carsta Löck
- Cinematography: Josef Střecha
- Edited by: Willy Zeunert
- Music by: Ludwig Schmidseder
- Production company: UFA
- Distributed by: Deutsche Filmvertriebs
- Release date: 16 November 1944
- Running time: 76 minutes
- Country: Germany
- Language: German

A Cheerful House (German: Ein fröhliches Haus) is a 1944 German comedy film directed by Johannes Guter and starring Carla Rust, Rolf Weih, Hans Leibelt and Carsta Löck. It was shot at the Tempelhof Studios in Berlin in the summer of 1943, although the release was delayed for more than a year. The film's sets were designed by the art director Anton Weber.

== Synopsis ==
Viktor Werneberg is a widowed swimming instructor with three children, who meets the sophisticated Irene Müller advice column in a newspaper. Although the two strike up a bond he is concerned that his chaotic household, including a lazy uncle Paul and an domineering housekeeper Grete, will put Irene off.

== Cast ==
- Carla Rust as Dr. Irene Müller
- Rolf Weih as Viktor Wernebach
- Hans Leibelt as Onkel Paul Hagedorn
- Carsta Löck as Grete
- Ursula Herking as Irenes Freundin Ursula
- Erich Fiedler as Clemens Langen
- Irmingard Schreiter as Sportstudentin Hilde Dyrenfurth
- Olga Limburg as Tante Liesbeth
- Lotte Rausch as Tante Mariechen
- Franz Weber as Ursulas erster Begleiter
- Wilhelm Bendow as Mann auf Gartenbank
- Karl Hannemann as Erster Möbelpacker
- Arthur Reinhardt as Zweiter Möbelpacker
- Georg Thomalla as Mann mit Platz in der Schlange
- Roswitha Knopf as Tochter Inge Werneberg
- Rosemarie Kemmerich as Tochter Rose Werneberg
- Klaus Puhlmann as Sohn Klaus Werneberg
- Gustav Püttjer as Kartenbüroangestellter

== Bibliography ==
- Bock, Hans-Michael & Bergfelder, Tim. The Concise CineGraph. Encyclopedia of German Cinema. Berghahn Books, 2009.
- Klaus, Ulrich J. Deutsche Tonfilme. Klaus-Archiv, 1988.
