= The Bordello in Rio =

1927 film by Hans Steinhoff

- Dutch release poster
- Directed by: Hans Steinhoff
- Written by: Norbert Jacques (novel); Bobby E. Lüthge
- Produced by: Georg Jacoby
- Starring: Vivian Gibson; Albert Steinrück; Hans Stüwe; Suzy Vernon
- Cinematography: Franz Planer
- Music by: Pasquale Perris
- Production company: Georg Jacoby-Film
- Distributed by: Messtro-Orplid
- Release date: 16 September 1927
- Running time: 60 minutes
- Country: Germany
- Languages: Silent; German intertitles

The Bordello in Rio or The Women's House of Rio (German: Das Frauenhaus von Rio) is a 1927 silent drama film directed by Hans Steinhoff and starring Vivian Gibson, Albert Steinrück and Hans Stüwe. It was based on a novel by Norbert Jacques which was remade twice as Blondes for Export (1950) and Final Destination: Red Lantern (1960). In the United States, the film was re-edited by Bud Pollard and released as Girls for Sale.

The film's sets were designed by the art directors Otto Erdmann and Hans Sohnle. It was shot at the Babelsberg Studio in Berlin and on location in Hamburg.

== Synopsis ==
A gang of white slavers lure young women to Rio de Janeiro to work as nightclub performers then force them to work as prostitutes.

== Main cast ==
- Vivian Gibson as Frau Schwarz-Lopez
- Albert Steinrück as Paul Schröder
- Hans Stüwe as Ernst Verloost
- Ernst Deutsch as Plüsch
- Robert Scholz as Alfredo
- Else Reval as Frau Garcia
- Suzy Vernon as Kordula Schröder
- Julia Serda as Frau Schröder, Kordula's mother
- Anna von Palen as Frau Gold
- Eugen Neufeld as Schiffs Kapitän
- Gertrud Walter as Gertrud
- Kurt Gerron as Kastilio
- Lissy Arna as Josepha, Alfredos Frau

== Bibliography ==
- Goble, Alan (1999). The Complete Index to Literary Sources in Film. Walter de Gruyter. ISBN 978-3-11-095194-3.
