= Edith Prager =

Austrian actress

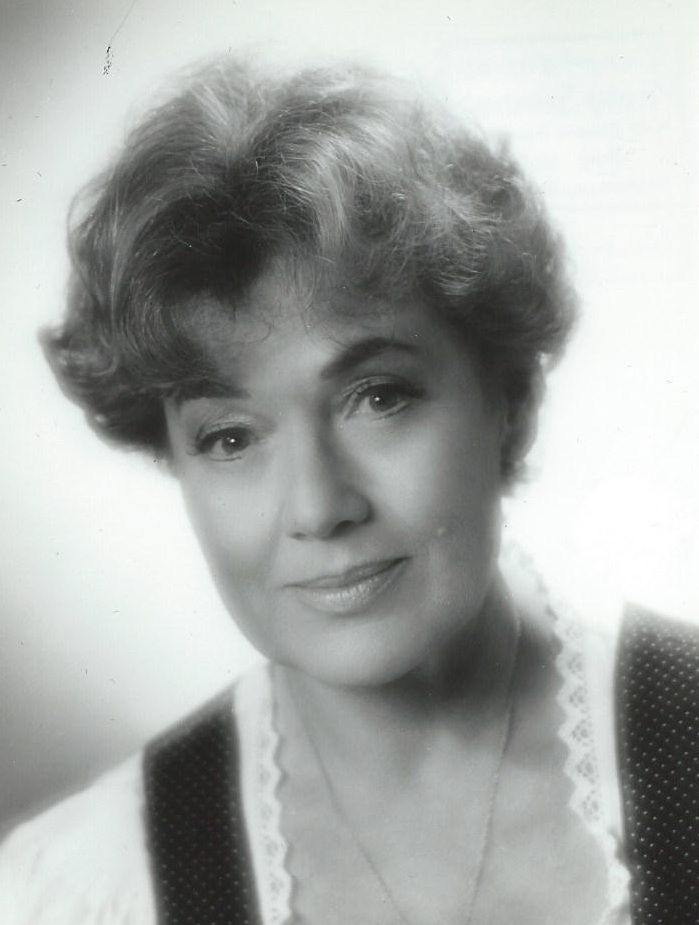
- Born: 28 March 1922; Vienna, Austria
- Died: 14 March 2013 (aged 90); Vienna, Austria
- Occupation: Actress
- Years active: 1948–1960 (film)

Edith Prager (28 March 1922 – 14 March 2013) was an Austrian stage and film actress. She later began a second career as a television presenter.

== Selected filmography ==
- Kiss Me Casanova (1949)
- Good Fortune in Ohio (1950)
- Czardas of Hearts (1951)
- 1. April 2000 (1952)
- Herr Puntila and His Servant Matti (1955/1960)

== Bibliography ==
- Goble, Alan. The Complete Index to Literary Sources in Film. Walter de Gruyter, 1999.
