= Eugen Scotoni =

- Born: 29 July 1873; Vienna, Austrian Empire
- Died: 29 May 1961 (aged 87); Zurich, Switzerland
- Other name: Eugen Scotoni-Gassmann
- Occupation: Businessman

Eugen Scotoni (1873–1961) was an influential Austrian-born Swiss businessman from the construction, real estate and film industries. He built the first Swiss skyscraper in Lausanne in the 1930s. In the early 1930s, he acquired control of the large German film company Terra Film. He allowed his sons to run it, particularly Ralph Scotoni. After the company, along with the rest of the industry, was nationalised in the mid-1930s the Scotoni's left Germany and the film production business but carried on running a chain of cinemas in Switzerland. He founded the Scotoni-Gassmann foundation, providing affordable housing to families with many children and economically weak elderly. He was married to Angelina Gassmann (1877–1953), and is sometimes known as Eugen Scotoni-Gassmann. Other children included Adrian, Angela, Edwin, Hildegard and Anton-Eric Scotoni, who became well known for bringing film stars such as Sophia Loren, Audrey Hepburn and Roger Moore to Zurich.

== Bibliography ==
- Killy, Wather. Dictionary of German Biography, Volume 9. Walter de Gruyter, 2005.
