= Good Fortune in Ohio =

1950 film

- Directed by: Heinz Paul
- Written by: Ludwig Bender; Edgar Kahn; Heinz Paul
- Produced by: Heinrich Schier; Wilhelm Sperber
- Starring: Hermann Brix; Edith Prager; Loni Heuser
- Cinematography: Erich Claunigk
- Edited by: Doris Zeltmann
- Music by: Herbert Jarczyk
- Production company: Merkur-Film
- Distributed by: Danubia; Emka-Filmverleih
- Release date: 22 December 1950
- Running time: 85 minutes
- Country: West Germany
- Language: German

Good Fortune in Ohio (German: Glück aus Ohio) is a 1950 West German comedy film directed by Heinz Paul and starring Hermann Brix, Edith Prager and Loni Heuser. It was shot at the Schwanthalerhöhe Studios in Munich and on location around the city and its vicinity. The film's sets were designed by the art director Hans Kuhnert.

== Synopsis ==
Gustl Kreuder is a salesman of fire extinguishers who struggled to make ends meet. To give his wife Kathrin some hope, he pretends he has received an inheritance from an uncle in the United States and can occasionally treat her. Word gets out and he soon finds himself in great demand socially and professionally due to his deception. While driving one day he sees a luxury American car in trouble and on flames, and rushes to help. The owner is so impressed that he places a very large order for fire extinguishers, proving that some part of the "economic miracle" was due to his deception.

== Cast ==
- Hermann Brix as Gustl Kreuder
- Edith Prager as Kathrin, seine Frau
- Loni Heuser as Fanny Schulz
- Josef Sieber as Ottokar Schulz
- Paul Henckels as Direktor Hasenkamp
- Adolf Gondrell as C.O. Klotz
- Helmuth Rudolph as Herkules
- Linda Caroll as Patricia

== Bibliography ==
- Goble, Alan. The Complete Index to Literary Sources in Film. Walter de Gruyter, 1999.
