= Carla Rust =

German actress

- Born: 15 September 1908; Bremen; German Empire
- Died: 27 December 1977 (aged 69); Hindelang, Bavaria; West Germany
- Occupation: Film actress

Carla Rust (15 September 1908 – 27 December 1977) was a German film actress. She appeared as a leading lady in a number of films during the Nazi era. She was married to the actor Sepp Rist.

== Selected filmography ==
- Don't Lose Heart, Suzanne! (1935)
- The Accusing Song (1936)
- Madame Bovary (1937)
- Mrs. Sylvelin (1938)
- Revolutionary Wedding (1938)
- The Stars Shine (1938)
- Love Letters from Engadin (1938)
- Marionette (1939)
- Robert and Bertram (1939)
- His Son (1942)
- Weiße Wäsche (1942)
- Heaven, We Inherit a Castle (1943)
- A Cheerful House (1944)
- The Beautiful Miller (1954)
- Doctor Solm (1955)
- Johannisnacht (1956)
- My Husband's Getting Married Today (1956)

== Bibliography ==
- O'Brien, Mary-Elizabeth. Nazi Cinema as Enchantment: The Politics of Entertainment in the Third Reich. Camden House, 2006.
