= His Son =

1942 film directed by Peter Paul Brauer

- Directed by: Peter Paul Brauer
- Written by: Peter Paul Brauer; Willy Clever
- Produced by: Alf Teichs; Walter Tost
- Starring: Otto Wernicke; Rolf Weih; Hilde Schneider; Karin Hardt
- Cinematography: Jan Roth
- Edited by: Helmuth Schönnenbeck
- Music by: Werner Bochmann; Hans Ebert
- Production company: Terra Film
- Distributed by: Terra Film
- Release date: 10 February 1942
- Running time: 87 minutes
- Country: Germany
- Language: German

His Son (Sein Sohn) is a 1942 German drama film directed by Peter Paul Brauer and starring Otto Wernicke, Rolf Weih, Hilde Schneider and Karin Hardt. It was shot at the Hostivar Studios in Prague. The film's sets were designed by the art directors Gustav A. Knauer and Arthur Schwarz.

== Cast ==
- Otto Wernicke as Vater Brugg, Geschäftsführer bei Hellmers
- Rolf Weih as Peter, Bruggs Sohn, Angestellter bei Hellmers
- Hermann Brix as Herbert, Bruggs Sohn, Musiker
- Hilde Schneider as Christl, Herberts Tochter
- Karin Hardt as Brigitte, Frau Hellmers Nichte
- Ida Wüst as Frau Hellmers, Inhaberin des Juweliergeschäfts
- Gunnar Möller as Willi, Herberts Sohn
- Eva Tinschmann as Anna, Haushälterin bei Brugg
- Carla Rust as Charlotte Jülich, Sekretärin im Juweliergeschäft
- Clemens Hasse as Hugo Guricke
- Max Gülstorff as Gurickes Vater
- Antonie Jaeckel as Gurickes Mutter
- Fritz Odemar as Richard Flemming, Generalmusikdirektor
- Rudolf Schündler as Der 'Elegante' Juwelendieb und Einbrecher
- Reinhold Bernt as Heini - Komplize des 'eleganten' Diebs
- Anton Pointner as Rennicke, das Renngigerl
- Gert Witt as Max Ziernagel, Schüler
- Oskar Matthies as Der Kriminalassistent
- Gerhard Dammann as Der Hauswart
- Walter Fischer as Mitschüler Willis - der beinahe ertrinkt
- Oskar Höcker as Der Ober im Kaffeehaus
- Sacha Keith as Eine Freundin Brigittes im Wasserklub
- Paul Mederow as Der Gefängnisdirektor
- Kurt Daehn as Richter, Direktor des Wasserklubs
- Hans Unterkircher as Willis Lehrer
- Walter Steinweg as Ein 'Pferdekenner' auf der Rennbahn
- Berndt Werner as Ein Gefängnisbeamter
- Arthur Wiesner as Ein Gefängnisbeamter

== Bibliography ==
- Holmstrom, John. The Moving Picture Boy: An International Encyclopaedia from 1895 to 1995, Norwich, Michael Russell, 1996
- Klaus, Ulrich J. Deutsche Tonfilme: Jahrgang 1942. Klaus-Archiv, 1988.
- Skopal, Pavel & Winkel, Roel Vande. (ed.) Film Professionals in Nazi-Occupied Europe: Mediation Between the National-Socialist Cultural 'New Order' and Local Structures. Springer International Publishing, 2021.
