= Ralph Scotoni =

- Born: 1901; Zurich, Switzerland
- Died: 1955; Trieste, Italy
- Occupation(s): Businessman film producer

Ralph Scotoni (1901–1955) was a Swiss businessman notable for his involvement in the German film industry. He was the son of Eugen Scotoni. Between 1930 and 1935, when it was nationalised by the German government, he oversaw his family's interest in Terra Film – the second most important German production company behind UFA. Scotoni automatically became a member of the Nazi Party (as was common for owners of large companies) but never picked up his membership card. Many of his later films depicted similarities between Switzerland and Nazi Germany. He left Germany in 1935 after the nationalization of Terra.

== Selected filmography ==
- The Man Who Murdered (1931)
- William Tell (1934)
- The Champion of Pontresina (1934)
- The Lost Valley (1934)

== Bibliography ==
- Killy, Wather. Dictionary of German Biography, Volume 9. Walter de Gruyter, 2005.
