= Fruit in the Neighbour's Garden (1956 film) =

1956 film

- Directed by: Erich Engels
- Written by: Erich Engels; Wolf Neumeister
- Produced by: Eberhard Meichsner; Walter Traut
- Starring: Oskar Sima; Grethe Weiser; Gundula Korte
- Cinematography: Walter Riml
- Edited by: Walter Boos
- Music by: Werner Scharfenberger
- Production company: Divina-Film
- Distributed by: Gloria Film
- Release date: 3 August 1956
- Running time: 92 minutes
- Country: West Germany
- Language: German

Fruit in the Neighbour's Garden (German: Kirschen in Nachbars Garten) is a 1956 West German comedy film directed by Erich Engels and starring Oskar Sima, Grethe Weiser and Gundula Korte. It is a remake of the 1935 film of the same title.

The film's sets were designed by the art directors Hans Jürgen Kiebach and Gabriel Pellon.

== Cast ==
- Oskar Sima as Versicherungsvertreter Sperling
- Grethe Weiser as Camilla - seine Frau
- Gundula Korte as Inge Sperling - beider Tochter
- Ursula Herking as Berta - 1.Dienstmädchen
- Helen Vita as Rita - 2.Dienstmädchen
- Albert Florath as Dr. Kieselbach - Arzt
- Gerty Godden as Anna Kieselbach - Seine Frau
- Peter Garden as Christian Kieselbach - beider Sohn
- Paul Henckels as Schriftsteller Wendland
- Wolfgang Völz as Klaus Wendland
- Peter Carsten as Briefträger
- Robert Fackler as Justizwachtmeister Pfeffer
- Hannes Schiel as Versicherungsdirektor Usedom
- Carsta Löck as Hintertupferin
- Nora Minor as Milchfrau Wurzer

== Bibliography ==
- Hans-Michael Bock and Tim Bergfelder. The Concise Cinegraph: An Encyclopedia of German Cinema. Berghahn Books.
