= An Old Heart Becomes Young Again =

1942 film

- Directed by: Erich Engel
- Written by: Lotte Neumann; Maurus Pacher; Walter Wassermann
- Produced by: Fritz Klotsch
- Starring: Emil Jannings; Maria Landrock; Viktor de Kowa
- Cinematography: Fritz Arno Wagner
- Edited by: Martha Dübber
- Music by: Theo Mackeben
- Production company: Tobis Film
- Distributed by: Deutsche Filmvertriebs
- Release date: 2 April 1943
- Running time: 97 minutes
- Country: Germany
- Language: German

An Old Heart Becomes Young Again (German: Altes Herz wird wieder jung) is a 1943 German comedy film directed by Erich Engel and starring Emil Jannings, Maria Landrock and Viktor de Kowa. It was shot at the Halensee Studios in Berlin. The film's sets were designed by the art directors Otto Hunte and Karl Vollbrecht. It was remade in 1958 as the Austrian film One Should Be Twenty Again.

== Synopsis ==
Friedrich Wilhelm Hoffmann has never married, choosing to focus on the success of his chocolate factory. His more distant, grasping relatives have high hopes of an inheritance. However, rumours begin to swirl when the seventy-year old Hoffman is seen with Brigitte who is around fifty years younger than him. In fact she is the granddaughter he never knew he had. After a brief fling with a woman when he was a young man that his father insisted he end the relationship, but she secretly bore him a son. He asks his nephew Paul to take her into the company and she is soon working as his secretary.

== Cast ==
- Emil Jannings as Fabrikdirektor Friedrich Wilhelm Hoffmann
- Maria Landrock as Enkelin Brigitte Lüders
- Viktor de Kowa as Neffe Dr. Paul Dehnhardt
- Will Dohm as Heinrich Hoffmann
- Elisabeth Flickenschildt as Heinrichs Frau Jenny Hoffmann
- Harald Paulsen as Richard Lorenz
- Roma Bahn as Richards Frau Irene Lorenz
- Gerta Böttcher as Richards Tochter Lilo Lorenz
- Margit Symo as Ilona Halmos
- Paul Hubschmid as Willibald Mack
- Paul Henckels as Justizrat Flinth
- Max Gülstorff as Professor Tiburtius
- Renée Stobrawa as Frau Wendisch
- Ilse Petri as Lotte Wendisch
- Lucie Höflich as Frau Blume
- Hans Junkermann as Friedrichs Diener Windel
- Petra Unkel as Eine Freundin Brigittes, die bei Friedrich tanzt
- Franz Weber as Logenschliesser in der Oper
- Klaus Pohl as Süsswarenverkaüfer am Bahnhof
- Erich Dunskus as Friedrichs Chauffeur
- Angelo Ferrari as Ilona Halmos' Begleiter am Bahnhof
- Ilse Fürstenberg as Portiersfrau von Brigitte

== Bibliography ==
- Bock, Hans-Michael & Bergfelder, Tim. The Concise CineGraph. Encyclopedia of German Cinema. Berghahn Books, 2009.
- Heins, Laura. Nazi Film Melodrama. University of Illinois Press, 2013.
