= Rembrandt (1942 film) =

1942 film directed by Hans Steinhoff

- Directed by: Hans Steinhoff
- Written by: Valerian Tornius (novel); Kurt Heuser; Hans Steinhoff
- Produced by: Ernst Günther Techow
- Starring: Ewald Balser; Hertha Feiler; Gisela Uhlen; Aribert Wäscher
- Cinematography: Richard Angst
- Edited by: Alice Ludwig
- Music by: Alois Melichar
- Production company: Terra Film
- Distributed by: Deutsche Filmvertriebs
- Release date: June 17, 1942
- Running time: 99 minutes
- Country: Germany
- Language: German

Rembrandt is a 1942 German historical drama film directed by Hans Steinhoff and starring Ewald Balser, Hertha Feiler, Gisela Uhlen, and Aribert Wäscher. It was based on the novel Zwischen Hell und Dunkel by Valerian Tornius and depicts the life of the Dutch painter Rembrandt.

The film's sets were designed by the art director Walter Röhrig. It was shot at the Tempelhof and Babelsberg Studios in Berlin. Location shooting took place in German-occupied Amsterdam and the Cinetone Studios in the city were also used.

== Main cast ==
- Ewald Balser as Rembrandt
- Hertha Feiler as Saskia van Rijn
- Gisela Uhlen as Hendrickje Stoffels
- Elisabeth Flickenschildt as Geertje Dierks
- Theodor Loos as Jan Six
- Aribert Wäscher as Uylenburgh, Saskia's relative
- Paul Henckels as Radierer Seeghers
- Hildegard Grethe as Ms. Seeghers
- Wilfried Seyferth as Ulricus Vischer
- Paul Rehkopf as brother Adriaen
- Rolf Weih as student Eeckhout
- Clemens Hasse as student Philip
- Helmut Weiss as student Cornelis
- Heinrich Schroth as doctor Tulp
- Robert Bürkner as notary Wilkens
- Karl Dannemann as Banning Cocq
- Walther Süssenguth as Piet

== Bibliography ==
- de Waard, Marco (2012). Imagining Global Amsterdam: History, Culture, and Geography in a World City. Amsterdam University Press. ISBN 978-90-8964-367-4.
