= Max Gülstorff =

German actor

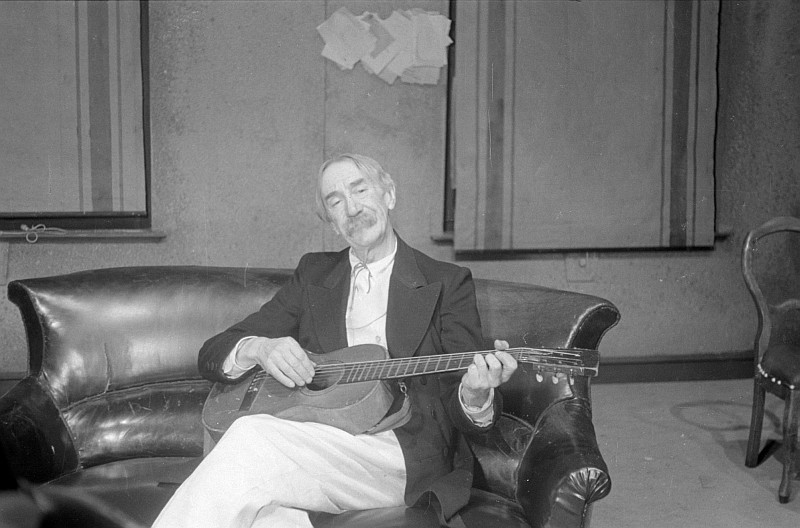
- Born: 23 March 1882; Tilsit, East Prussia, German Empire
- Died: 6 February 1947 (aged 64); Berlin, Germany
- Occupation: Actor
- Years active: 1916–1949

Max Walter Gülstorff (23 March 1882 – 6 February 1947) was a German actor and stage director.

== Biography ==
Gülstorff was born in Tilsit, East Prussia. He first appeared in 1900 at the Rudolstadt municipal Theater and moved to Cottbus in 1908.

In 1911 Gülstorff went to the Schillertheater Berlin and became a member of the ensemble of Max Reinhardt's Deutsches Theater in 1915. He also acted at the Großes Schauspielhaus and the Volksbühne Berlin. In 1923 Gülstorff moved to Vienna, where he worked as a stage director at the Theater in der Josefstadt.

Gülstorff died in Berlin and was buried at the Lichtenrade cemetery.

== Filmography ==
- The Uncanny House (1916)
- Let There Be Light (1917)
- 1918: Opfer um Opfer
- Around the World in Eighty Days (1919)
- Veritas Vincit (1919)
- 1919: Die Nackten – Ein sozialpolitischer Film
- Prince Cuckoo (1919)
- Baccarat (1919)
- President Barrada (1920)
- In the Whirl of Life (1920)
- 1920: Der Henker von Sankt Marien
- 1920: Der König von Paris (2 parts)
- The Legend of Holy Simplicity (1920)
- 1921: Comrades
- The House on the Moon (1921)
- Lady Hamilton (1921)
- The Conspiracy in Genoa (1921)
- Lola Montez, the King's Dancer (1922)
- The Love Nest (1922)
- A Glass of Water (1923)
- The Lost Shoe (1923)
- The Love of a Queen (1923)
- Schatten – Eine nächtliche Halluzination (1923)
- William Tell (1923)
- Leap Into Life (1924)
- The Secret Agent (1924)
- Cab No. 13 (1926)
- The Armoured Vault (1926)
- Sword and Shield (1926)
- Heads Up, Charley (1927)
- The Master of Nuremberg (1927)
- His Late Excellency (1927)
- The Trial of Donald Westhof (1927)
- Prinz Louis Ferdinand (1927)
- Honour Thy Mother (1928)
- Looping the Loop (1928)
- The Countess of Sand (1928)
- Hurrah! I Live! (1928)
- Don Juan in a Girls' School (1928)
- The Lady with the Mask (1928)
- Mascots (1929)
- The Man Without Love (1929)
- Darling of the Gods (1930)
- Zwei Krawatten (1930)
- The Captain from Köpenick (1931)
- Der Kongreß tanzt (1931)
- The Theft of the Mona Lisa (1931)
- Everyone Asks for Erika (1931)
- I Go Out and You Stay Here (1931)
- 1931: Dann schon lieber Lebertran
- The Countess of Monte Cristo (1932)
- The Victor (1932)
- You Don't Forget Such a Girl (1932)
- I Do Not Want to Know Who You Are (1932)
- The Tsar's Diamond (1932)
- Man Without a Name (1932)
- Two Lucky Days (1932)
- The Escape to Nice (1932)
- Today Is the Day (1933)
- 1933: Die Nacht der großen Liebe
- The Tsarevich (1933)
- Wedding at Lake Wolfgang (1933)
- The Castle in the South (1933)
- Love Must Be Understood (1933)
- Happy Days in Aranjuez (1933)
- Her Highness the Saleswoman (1933)
- The Love Hotel (1933)
- Annette in Paradise (1934)
- You Are Adorable, Rosmarie (1934)
- Frasquita (1934)
- 1934: Ich sing' mich in dein Herz hinein
- 1934: Eine Siebzehnjährige
- Love and the First Railway (1934)
- The Last Waltz (1934)
- 1934: Ich kenn' dich nicht und liebe dich
- The Sun Rises (1934)
- The Black Whale (1934)
- Master of the World (1934)
- Ihr größter Erfolg (1934)
- Charley's Aunt (1934)
- I Was Jack Mortimer (1935)
- The Bird Seller (1935)
- 1935: Ein falscher Fuffziger
- Fruit in the Neighbour's Garden (1935)
- 1935: Buchhalter Schnabel
- A Night of Change (1935)
- Fresh Wind from Canada (1935)
- 1935: Lärm um Weidemann
- The King's Prisoner (1935)
- The Emperor's Candlesticks (1936)
- Susanne in the Bath (1936)
- Scandal at the Fledermaus (1936)
- A Hoax (1936)
- The Abduction of the Sabine Women (1936)
- 1936: Die un-erhörte Frau
- 1936: Heißes Blut
- The Ruler (1937)
- Capers (1937)
- The Broken Jug (1937)
- Napoleon Is to Blame for Everything (1938)
- 1938: Scheidungsreise
- 1938: Gastspiel im Paradies
- 1938: Schüsse in Kabine 7
- 1938: Kleiner Mann – ganz groß!
- The Girl with a Good Reputation (1938)
- 1939: Eine kleine Nachtmusik
- Congo Express (1939)
- The False Step (1939)
- Kitty and the World Conference (1939)
- The Star of Rio (1940)
- 1940: Der Weg zu Isabel
- 1940: Alles Schwindel
- Counterfeiters (1940)
- 1941: Kleine Mädchen – große Sorgen
- 1941: Unser kleiner Junge
- Ohm Krüger (1941)
- 1941: Blutsbrüderschaft
- Happiness Is the Main Thing (1941)
- 1941: Das leichte Mädchen
- Andreas Schlüter (1942)
- Doctor Crippen (1942)
- The Old Boss (1942)
- His Son (1942)
- Heaven, We Inherit a Castle (1943)
- 1943: Wenn die Sonne wieder scheint
- 1943: Die Jungfern vom Bischofsberg
- An Old Heart Becomes Young Again (1943)
- Immensee (1943)
- A Salzburg Comedy (1943)
- 1943: Ein glücklicher Mensch
- 1944: Es fing so harmlos an
- Die Feuerzangenbowle (1944)
- 1944: Die heimlichen Bräute
- Glück unterwegs (1944)
- Young Hearts (1944)
- The Black Robe (1944)
- Viennese Girls (1945)
- A Man Like Maximilian (1945)
- 1945: Der Puppenspieler
- 1945: Wir beide liebten Katharina
- Tell the Truth (1946)
- Ghost in the Castle (1947)
- 1949: Schuß um Mitternacht
