= Heaven, We Inherit a Castle =

1943 film

- Hans Brausewetter and Anny Ondra
- Directed by: Peter Paul Brauer
- Written by: Otto Ernst Hesse; Eberhard Keindorff; Günter Neumann; Hans Fallada (novel)
- Starring: Anny Ondra; Hans Brausewetter; Carla Rust
- Cinematography: Václav Hanus
- Music by: Hans Ebert
- Production company: Prag-Film
- Release date: 16 April 1943
- Running time: 95 minutes
- Country: Germany
- Language: German

Heaven, We Inherit a Castle (German: Himmel, wir erben ein Schloß) is a 1943 German comedy film directed by Peter Paul Brauer and starring Anny Ondra, Hans Brausewetter, and Carla Rust. The film was shot in German-occupied Prague, Ondra's hometown, by the Prag-Film company using the Hostivar Studios. It was Ondra's last starring role.

The film is based on Hans Fallada's novel Kleiner Mann - großer Mann, alles vertauscht.

== Cast ==
- Anny Ondra as Karla Schreyvogel
- Hans Brausewetter as Max Schreyvogel
- Carla Rust as Leonore Kantner
- Richard Häussler as Georg Kalübbe
- Max Gülstorff as Kracht
- Oskar Sima as Matz
- Herbert Hübner as Justizrat Steppe
- Heinz Salfner as Karl Strabow
- Karl Hellmer as Schlöger
- Gisela Scholz as Eduarda Schreyvogel
- Walter Janssen as Kantner
- Eduard Bornträger as Gustav Schröder

== Bibliography ==
- Bock, Hans-Michael; Bergfelder, Tim, eds. (2009). The Concise Cinegraph: Encyclopaedia of German Cinema. New York: Berghahn Books. ISBN 978-1-57181-655-9.
