= Comrades at Sea =

1938 film

- Directed by: Heinz Paul
- Written by: Peter Francke; Toni Huppertz; Alf Teichs; Ingo Adalbert Zerbe
- Produced by: Alfred Greven; Alfred Bittins
- Starring: Theodor Loos; Carola Höhn; Julius Brandt
- Cinematography: Hans Schneeberger
- Music by: Robert Küssel
- Production company: Terra Film
- Distributed by: Terra Film
- Release date: 12 March 1938
- Running time: 89 minutes
- Country: Germany
- Language: German

Comrades at Sea (German: Kameraden auf See) is a 1938 German war film directed by Heinz Paul and starring Theodor Loos, Carola Höhn and Julius Brandt. It was shot at the Marienfelde Studios of Terra Film in Berlin and on location around Kiel and Flensburg in Schleswig-Holstein. The film's sets were designed by the art directors Heinrich Richter and Gabriel Pellon. The film is set during the Spanish Civil War, which it portrays as a Communist uprising against the lawful government.

== Synopsis ==
The crew of a German torpedo boat intervene to rescue some passengers on a civilian ship seized by Soviet-led Spanish Republicans. Amongst those on board is Carmita, who two of the naval officers are attracted to.

== Cast ==
- Theodor Loos as Konteradmiral Brackhusen
- Ingeborg Hertel as Inge, Seine Tochter
- Julius Brandt as Großkaufmann Prätorius
- Carola Höhn as Carmita - Seine Tochter
- Paul Wagner as Kapitänleutnant Rank
- Fred Doederlein as Leutnant Born
- Jaspar von Oertzen as Fähnrich Z. S. Fischer
- Rolf Weih as Fähnrich Z. S. Prätorius
- Günther Vogdt as Fähnrich Z. S. von Raff
- Theo Brandt as Fähnrich Z. S. Lutz
- Ferry Reich as Fähnrich Z. S. Bern
- Josef Sieber as Oberbootsmannsmaat Reschke
- Heinrich Schroth as Kapitän Der Marana
- Angelo Ferrari as Legationsrat Matassi
- Reinhold Bernt as Kommissar Sakin
- Hans Kettler as Steuermann Martinez
- Ernst Behmer as Ober Im Café
- Gustaf Dennert as Fähnrich
- Ellen Gutschmidt as Junge Tänzerin Im Café
- Albert Hehn as Sailor
- Fritz Hoopts as Spanischer Fischer
- Charly Huber as Fähnrich
- Kurt Iller as Gefangener Auf Der Marana
- Arthur Kühn as Fähnrich
- Annie Lorenz as Offiziersfrau
- Josef Peterhans as Einer Der Roten, De Die Marana Kapern
- Georg A. Profé as Fähnrich
- Gustav Püttjer as Fischer
- Arthur Reinhardt as Leutnant Feldmann, Offizier Des Admiralsschiffes
- Maria Seidler as Anna, Wirtschafterin Bei Brackhusen

== Bibliography ==
- Welch, David (2001). Propaganda and the German Cinema, 1933–1945. I.B. Tauris. ISBN 978-1-86064-520-4.
