= Friedemann Bach (film) =

1941 German historical drama film

- Directed by: Traugott Müller
- Written by: Helmut Brandis; Eckart von Naso; Ludwig Metzger
- Produced by: Gustaf Gründgens
- Starring: Gustaf Gründgens; Leny Marenbach; Johannes Riemann; Camilla Horn
- Cinematography: Walter Pindter
- Edited by: Alexandra Anatra
- Music by: Mark Lothar
- Production company: Terra Film
- Distributed by: Terra Film
- Release date: 25 June 1941
- Running time: 102 minutes
- Country: Nazi Germany
- Language: German

Friedemann Bach is a 1941 German historical drama film directed by Traugott Müller and starring Gustaf Gründgens, Leny Marenbach and Johannes Riemann. The film depicts the life of Johann Sebastian Bach's son Wilhelm Friedemann Bach. It is based on Albert Emil Brachvogel's fiction novel Friedemann Bach. Wilhelm Friedemann Bach is shown as a gifted son trying to escape his father's shadow.

== Plot ==
During a house concert, the Bach family gets a visit by their son Wilhelm Friedemann, who has just given up his position in Dresden because he no longer could endure the reprisals of his superiors. After he helps his sister Frederike to tell father Johann Sebastian about her engagement to Johann Christoph Altnikol, the family gets a visit from a messenger of the Saxon Court. Johann Sebastian is asked to take part in a musical competition against French composer Louis Marchand. Johann Sebastian, however, does not want to let his Thomanerchor down and so, he sends Friedemann to Dresden.

Friedemann wins the competition, as Louis Marchand takes flight during Friedemann's performance. Many aristocrats, among whom is Comtesse Antonia Kollowrat, come to Friedemann to be taught in music; Friedemann is ordered by the court to write a ballet. Friedemann and ballet dancer Mariella Fiorini fall in love with each other, which is also due to the influence of Count Graf von Brühl, who has an eye on Antonia. After the ballet is successful, Friedemann is to be appointed court composer. As Antonia criticizes the ballet, Friedemann recognizes that the court's superficiality does not go together with his artistic ambitions. Friedemann and Antonia fall in love with each other. Friedemann promises to find a new position and to get Antonia to join him; his father will surely help him.

However, Johann Sebastian dies. So, Friedemann is confronted with a series of disappointments. Being demanded again and again to play music following his father's style, he finally passes, when applying in Braunschweig, one of his father's early compositions off as one of his own. The truth is discovered, Antonia and Christoph are unable to understand Friedemann, who is frustrated and responds that he no longer wants to be compared with his father Johann Sebastian but wants to be Wilhelm Friedemann Bach.

Embittered, he joins a group of travelling actors who regard him to be as what he is. As Christoph comes after years to see him and tells him that Antonia had been waiting for him in Braunschweig, Friedemann wants to see her again. Antonia, however, has meanwhile married Count Heinrich von Brühl. When Friedemann's group gives a performance in Dresden, the Count arranges that Friedemann and Antonia meet. Although she is still willing to help him, Friedemann shows her his full embitterment; at the Count's behest, Friedemann has to leave Saxony.

Desperately, Friedemann offers one of his father's compositions in a music store. After one of the trader's clients mocks his family, Friedemann confronts the client who stabs Friedemann with a rapier; Friedemann is taken home by his brother Carl Philipp Emanuel, where he dies.

== Production and release ==
Friedemann Bach was intended to further Nazi propaganda objectives by holding up the Bach family as an example of German cultural greatness. In particular, it is one of several films from Nazi Germany produced during World War II that depict "great Germans" in situations of conflict. However, David Stewart Hull writes that "unfortunately for [Joseph] Goebbels and his writers, most of [the family's] lives were dull," making them less suitable for a dramatic film. Additionally, the Bachs were largely focused on composing church music, which the Nazis wanted to avoid. Wilhelm Friedemann Bach was chosen as a main character for being the "black sheep of the family", which made him more suitable for a dramatic protagonist role. Nevertheless, the film is quite historically inaccurate.

The film was released on June 25, 1941. It is the first and only feature film directed by Traugott Müller, who was the regular set designer for the stage and opera productions of Gustaf Gründgens. Müller died in 1944.

== Cast ==
- Gustaf Gründgens — Wilhelm Friedemann Bach
- Eugen Klöpfer — Johann Sebastian Bach
- Wolfgang Liebeneiner — Carl Philipp Emanuel Bach
- Lina Lossen — Anna Magdalena Bach
- Lotte Koch — Friederike Bach
- Leny Marenbach — Antonia Kollowrat
- Johannes Riemann — Heinrich von Brühl
- Camilla Horn — Mariella Fiorini
- Hermine Körner — Countess Kollowrat
- Gustav Knuth — Christoph Altnikol
- Sabine Peters — Charlotte von Erdmannsdorf
- Franz Schafheitlin — Sekretär Siepmann
- Franz Arzdorf — Kammerherr am königlichen Hof in Dresden
- Paul Bildt — Musikalienhändler Lohmann
- Ernst Dernburg — Kurfürst August III
- Erich Dunskus: Mitglied der fahrenden Theatertruppe
- Albert Florath: Gastwirt in Dresden
- Eric Helgar: Singender Gast bei Fiorini
- Karl Hellmer: Gärtner
- Liselotte Schaak: Gemahlin Josepha
- Werner Scharf: Baron am Dresdener Hof
- Just Scheu: Königlicher Kurier aus Dresden
- Alfred Schieske: Wirt in Braunschweig
- Heinrich Schroth: Gutsverwalter bei Baron von Sollnau
- Wolfgang Staudte: Musiker bei Philipp Emanuel Bach
- Annemarie Steinsieck: Frau von Erdmannsdorf
- Magnus Stifter: Zeremonienmeister des Königs in Dresden
- Leopold von Ledebur: Gast bei Fiorini
- Otto Wernicke: Kunde im Musikladen
- Wolf Trutz: Franz
- Walter Werner: Director of the theater troupe
- Boris Alekin: Louis Marchand

== Bibliography ==
- Hull, David Stewart (1969). Film in the Third Reich. University of California Press.
- Herbst-Meßlinger, Karin; Aurich, Rolf (2024-10-23). German Film. Volume 5: 1940-1949: From the Archives of the Deutsche Kinemathek. Hatje Cantz Verlag. ISBN 978-3-7757-5970-0.
- Schulenberg, David (2010). The Music of Wilhelm Friedemann Bach. University Rochester Press. p. 13. ISBN 978-1-58046-359-1.
