= Hermann Brix =

Austrian actor (1912–1982)

- Born: 9 February 1912; Innsbruck, County of Tyrol, Austro-Hungarian Empire
- Died: 4 October 1982 (aged 70)
- Occupation: Actor
- Years active: 1939-1950 (film)

Hermann Brix (9 February 1912–4 October 1982) was an Austrian stage and film actor.

== Selected filmography ==
- Maria Ilona (1939)
- Alarm at Station III (1939)
- Der Herr im Haus (1940)
- Counterfeiters (1940)
- Thrice Wed (1941)
- The Waitress Anna (1941)
- His Son (1942)
- Titanic (1943)
- The Golden Spider (1943)
- The Master Detective (1944)
- Good Fortune in Ohio (1950)

== Bibliography ==
- Goble, Alan. The Complete Index to Literary Sources in Film. Walter de Gruyter, 1999.
