= Pedro Will Hang =

1941 film

- Directed by: Veit Harlan
- Written by: Friedel Hartlaub (play); Ludwig Hynitzsch (play); Veit Harlan; Wolfgang Schleif
- Produced by: Christoph Mülleneisen; Franz Tappers
- Starring: Gustav Knuth; Heinrich George; Maria Landrock
- Cinematography: Bruno Mondi
- Edited by: Ludolf Grisebach
- Music by: Hans-Otto Borgmann
- Production company: Majestic-Film
- Distributed by: Tobis Film
- Release date: 11 July 1941
- Running time: 90 minutes
- Country: Germany
- Language: German
- Budget: 909,000 ℛℳ
- Box office: 1.2 million ℛℳ

Pedro Will Hang (German: Pedro soll hängen) is a 1941 German adventure film directed by Veit Harlan and starring Gustav Knuth, Heinrich George and Maria Landrock.

The film's sets were designed by the art directors Karl Machus and Erich Zander.

== Cast ==
- Gustav Knuth as Pedro, Hirte
- Heinrich George as Manuel, Kellner
- Maria Landrock as Pepita
- Jakob Tiedtke as Der Alkalde
- Ursula Deinert as Chequita
- Werner Scharf as José, Pferdehändler
- Charlotte Witthauer as Alice Baker
- Trude Tandar as Miss Evelyne
- Erich Fiedler as Amadeo de Montessandro
- Ernst Legal as Plebejano
- Franz Weber as Rodrigo
- Marianne Simson as Mädchen
- Ernst Rotmund
- Otto F. Henning as Stadtbewohner
- Hans Meyer-Hanno as Stadtbewohner
- Jutta Jol as Stadtbewohnerin
- Marlise Ludwig as Stadtbewohnerin
- Mohamed Husen as Pfleger
