= Peter Paul Brauer =

German film producer and film director

Peter Paul Brauer (16 May 1899, in Elberfeld – 28 April 1959, in Berlin) was a German film producer and film director.

In 1928, he became involved in film production in the Netherlands. That same year he returned to Germany and, over several years, produced several short films. After the takeover of the Nazis in March 1933, Brauer was production manager at the UFA. After 1938, he directed a number of feature films, mostly comedies.

Between April 1939 and November 1940 Brauer was production chief of Terra Film. At the beginning of 1940, Brauer was assigned by Propaganda Minister Joseph Goebbels to produce the antisemitic film Jud Süß (1940). Brauer assigned himself the task of directing the film; however, he ran into difficulties in casting. Frustrated at the delay, Goebbels removed him in favor of Veit Harlan.

In the 1940s, Brauer concentrated on directing and collaborated on some screenplays. Brauer was a member of the Nazi Party.

== Filmography ==
=== Producer ===
- 1933: Die Wette
- 1933: Die verlorene Melodie
- 1933: Der streitbare Herr Kickel
- 1933: Der Störenfried
- 1933: Das 13. Weltwunder
- 1933: Alles für Anita!
- 1933: Eine ideale Wohnung
- 1934: Zwei Genies
- 1934: Ritter wider Willen
- 1934: Lottchens Geburtstag
- 1934: Liebe und Zahnweh
- 1934: Ich bin Du
- 1934: Hochzeit am 13.
- 1934: Erstens kommt es anders
- 1935: Zimmer zu vermieten
- 1935: Dreimal Ehe
- 1935: Schnitzel fliegt
- 1935: Der eingebildete Kranke
- 1935: The Girl from the Marsh Croft
- 1935: UFA-Märchen
- 1935: April, April!
- 1936: Früh übt sich
- 1937: Bluff
- 1937: Gewitterflug zu Claudia
- 1953: The Dancing Heart

=== Director ===
- Der Boxstudent (1928, short)
- Der Erlkönig (1931)
- Die Gesangsstunde (1935, short)
- Der Uhrenladen (1935, short)
- Der große Preis von Europa (1935, short)
- Vier Mädel und ein Mann (1936)
- Kalbsragout mit Champignons (1936, short)
- Die perfekte Sekretärin (1937, short)
- Das Quartett (1937, short)
- The Girl of Last Night (1938)
- What Now, Sibylle? (1938)
- Das Verlegenheitskind (1938)
- Ich bin gleich wieder da (1939)
- The Swedish Nightingale (1941)
- The Waitress Anna (1941)
- His Son (1942)
- The Old Boss (1942)
- Heaven, We Inherit a Castle (1943)
- Die Jungfern vom Bischofsberg (1943)
- Glück bei Frauen (1944)
- It Began at Midnight (1951)

== See also ==
- List of films made in the Third Reich
- Nazism and cinema
