= Rolf Weih =

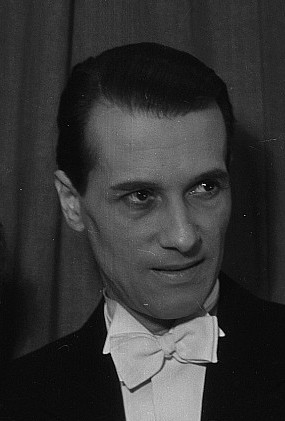
Rolf Weih

Rolf Weih (1906–1969) was a German film actor.

== Selected filmography ==
- Flachsmann the Educator (1930)
- Comrades at Sea (1938)
- Alarm at Station III (1939)
- In the Name of the People (1939)
- The Governor (1939)
- Alarm (1941)
- Comrades (1941)
- We Make Music (1942)
- Rembrandt (1942)
- Doctor Crippen (1942)
- My Wife Theresa (1942)
- His Son (1942)
- The Old Boss (1942)
- Love Premiere (1943)
- Don't Talk to Me About Love (1943)
- The Golden Spider (1943)
- A Man for My Wife (1943)
- A Cheerful House (1944)
- The Blue Swords (1949)
- Friday the Thirteenth (1949)
- The Murder Trial of Doctor Jordan (1949)
- Dark Eyes (1951)
- Torreani (1951)
- Not Without Gisela (1951)
- It Began at Midnight (1951)
- The Heath Is Green (1951)
- Fight of the Tertia (1952)
- The Chaste Libertine (1952)
- The Empress of China (1953)
- Such a Charade (1953)
- Dutch Girl (1953)
- Heroism after Hours (1955)
- Swelling Melodies (1955)
- Through the Forests and Through the Trees (1956)
- The Tour Guide of Lisbon (1956)
- The Model Husband (1956)
- Every Day Isn't Sunday (1959)
- Freddy and the Melody of the Night (1960)
- The Time Has Come (1960, TV series)

== Bibliography ==
- Fox, Jo. Film propaganda in Britain and Nazi Germany: World War II Cinema. Berg, 2007.
