= Wolf Neumeister =

German screenwriter (1897–1984)

- Born: 10 May 1897; Dresden, German Empire
- Died: 12 August 1984 (aged 87); Munich, West Germany
- Occupation: Screenwriter
- Years active: 1934-1966 (film)

Wolf Neumeister (1897–1984) was a German screenwriter and playwright. He was active in German cinema during the Nazi era and postwar West Germany. Amongst his notable works was the 1940 anti-British propaganda film The Fox of Glenarvon.

== Selected filmography ==
- The Girlfriend of a Big Man (1934)
- The Unsuspecting Angel (1936)
- Ball at the Metropol (1937)
- A Girl from the Chorus (1937)
- Women for Golden Hill (1938)
- What Now, Sibylle? (1938)
- The Day After the Divorce (1938)
- D III 88 (1939)
- The Fox of Glenarvon (1940)
- Battle Squadron Lützow (1941)
- The Waitress Anna (1941)
- The Dark Day (1943)
- A Flea in Her Ear (1943)
- The Golden Spider (1943)
- The Green Salon (1944)
- Blocked Signals (1948)
- Quartet of Five (1949)
- The Murder Trial of Doctor Jordan (1949)
- The Lady in Black (1951)
- Border Post 58 (1951)
- The White Adventure (1952)
- Three Days of Fear (1952)
- Ave Maria (1953)
- Such a Charade (1953)
- Come Back (1953)
- The Night Without Morals (1953)
- Wedding Bells (1954)
- Three Birch Trees on the Heath (1956)
- The Vulture Wally (1956)
- Fruit in the Neighbour's Garden (1956)
- Immer die Radfahrer (1958)
- Father, Mother and Nine Children (1958)
- Doctor Crippen Lives (1958)
- An American in Salzburg (1958)
- The Man Who Sold Himself (1959)
- Kein Mann zum Heiraten (1959)
- Oriental Nights (1960)
- Juanito (1960)
- Three Men in a Boat (1961)
- Wild Water (1962)
- The Murderer with the Silk Scarf (1966)

== Bibliography ==
- O'Brien, Mary-Elizabeth. Nazi Cinema as Enchantment. The Politics of Entertainment in the Third Reich. Camden House, 2006.
- Schönfeld, Christiane. The History of German Literature on Film. Bloomsbury Publishing, 2023.
