= Franz Nicklisch =

German actor

- Born: Franz Friedrich Nicklisch; 8 March 1906; Wernigerode, German Empire
- Died: 6 December 1975 (aged 69); West Berlin, West Germany
- Occupation: Actor
- Years active: 1931-1975

Franz Friedrich Nicklisch (8 March 1906 – 6 December 1975) was a German actor. He appeared in more than 50 films and television shows between 1931 and 1975. He is buried at the Waldfriedhof Zehlendorf next to his brother Hans Nicklisch.

== Selected filmography ==
- Storms of Passion (1932)
- Inge and the Millions (1933)
- The Black Whale (1934)
- Between Two Hearts (1934)
- Joan of Arc (1935)
- Under Blazing Heavens (1936)
- The Unsuspecting Angel (1936)
- The Girl with a Good Reputation (1938)
- Dance on the Volcano (1938)
- In the Name of the People (1939)
- Between Heaven and Earth (1942)
- Five Suspects (1950)
