= Doctor Crippen (1942 film) =

1942 film

- German film poster
- German: Dr. Crippen an Bord
- Directed by: Erich Engels
- Written by: Walter Ebert; Georg C. Klaren; Kurt E. Walter; Erich Engels
- Produced by: Eduard Kubat; Alf Teichs
- Starring: Rudolf Fernau; René Deltgen; Anja Elkoff; Gertrud Meyen
- Cinematography: E. W. Fiedler
- Edited by: Erich Palme
- Music by: Bernhard Eichhorn
- Production company: Terra Film
- Distributed by: Deutsche Filmvertriebs
- Release date: 6 November 1942
- Running time: 87 minutes
- Country: Germany
- Language: German
- Budget: 1,130,000 RM
- Box office: 2,245,000 RM

Doctor Crippen or Doctor Crippen on Board (German: Dr. Crippen an Bord) is a 1942 German crime film directed by Erich Engels and starring Rudolf Fernau, René Deltgen, and Anja Elkoff.

It was shot at the Barrandov and Hostivar Studios in Prague. The film's sets were designed by the art directors Artur Günther and Willi Eplinius.

== Cast ==
- Rudolf Fernau as Dr. Crippen
- René Deltgen as Düwell
- Anja Elkoff as Cora Crippen
- Gertrud Meyen as Lucie Talbot
- Rolf Weih as Arnoldi
- Max Gülstorff as Kendall
- Paul Dahlke as defense lawyer
- O. E. Hasse as Prof. Morrison
- Heinz Schorlemmer as Petersson, Steward auf der "Montrose"
- Walter Lieck as Michels
- Robert Bürkner as Nicolin
- Ernst Waldow as Dr. Hidden
- Wilhelm Bendow as Harras
- Günther Hadank as prosecutor
- Ernst Leudesdorff as judge
- Knut Hartwig as officer #1
- Adolf Fischer as radio operator Menton
- Olga Engl as Eine Nachbarin Dr. Crippens
- Hella Thornegg as Bertha, Dr. Crippen's neighbor
- Louis Brody as Pedro
- Meta Weber as Frau Martinetti
- Albert Johannes as Herr Martinetti
- Josef Keim as coroner
- Elisabeth Scherer as Rosy Dupont, Hausmädchen bei Dr. Crippen
- Käte Jöken-König as Frau von 'Otti'
- Ernst G. Schiffner as court reporter
- Peter Busse as Der Mann 'Otti' aus dem Publikum beim Verwandlungskünstler
- Leo Peukert as passenger
- Edith Wolff as Morrison's assistant
- Albert Lippert as guest of Dr. Crippen
- Arthur Reinhardt as guard at the court hearing
