= Arthur Reinhardt =

German actor (1893–1973)

- Born: 17 April 1893; Kiel, German Empire
- Died: 16 December 1973 (aged 80); Berlin, Germany
- Occupation: Actor
- Years active: 1927–1955

Arthur Reinhardt (17 April 1893 – 16 December 1973) was a German actor. He appeared in more than sixty films from 1927 to 1955.

== Selected filmography ==
| Year | Title | Role | Notes |
|---|---|---|---|
| 1949 | Quartet of Five | | |
| 1944 | A Cheerful House | | |
| 1942 | Doctor Crippen | | |
| 1942 | The Red Terror | | |
| 1942 | Attack on Baku | | |
| 1940 | Twilight | | |
| 1940 | Enemies | | |
| 1939 | Water for Canitoga | | |
| 1938 | The Marriage Swindler | | |
| 1938 | I Love You | | |
| 1938 | Comrades at Sea | | |
| 1938 | Sergeant Berry | | |
| 1938 | Shadows Over St. Pauli | | |
| 1937 | Alarm in Peking | | |
| 1937 | White Slaves | | |
| 1937 | The Divine Jetta | | |
| 1937 | Men Without a Fatherland | | |
| 1936 | Donogoo Tonka | | |
| 1936 | Orders Are Orders | | |
| 1936 | The Impossible Woman | | |
| 1934 | The Last Waltz | | |
| 1934 | The Riders of German East Africa | | |
| 1934 | The Four Musketeers | | |
| 1933 | The Lake Calls | | |
| 1932 | Marshal Forwards | | |
| 1929 | Three Days of Life and Death | | |
