= Hildegard Grethe =

German actress)

- Born: 14 May 1898; Hannover, German Empire
- Died: 26 December 1961 (aged 63); West Berlin, West Germany
- Occupation: Actress
- Years active: 1939-1963 (Film and TV)

Hildegard Grethe (1898–1961) was a German stage and film actress. During the 1940s she appeared in German films as a character actress playing matriarchs and aristocrats.

== Selected filmography ==
- Robert Koch (1939)
- Friedrich Schiller – The Triumph of a Genius (1940)
- Six Days of Leave (1941)
- Rembrandt (1942)
- The Dismissal (1942)
- Diesel (1942)
- The Old Boss (1942)
- Wedding in Barenhof (1942)
- Circus Renz (1943)
- Via Mala (1945)
- The Court Concert (1948)
- Film Without a Title (1948)
- An Everyday Story (1948)
- Girls Behind Bars (1949)
- Like Once Lili Marleen (1956)
- Studentin Helene Willfüer (1956)
- Banktresor 713 (1957)
- For Love and Others (1959)

== Bibliography ==
- Fox, Jo. Film Propaganda in Britain and Nazi Germany: World War II Cinema. Berg, 2007.
- Giesen, Rolf. Nazi Propaganda Films: A History and Filmography. McFarland, 2003.
