= Otto Wernicke =

German actor (1893-1965)

Otto Karl Robert Wernicke (30 September 1893, Osterode am Harz – 7 November 1965) was a German actor. He is best known for his role as police inspector Karl Lohmann in the two Fritz Lang films M and The Testament of Dr. Mabuse.

Married to a Jewish woman, he was only able to continue working in Germany after the Nazi Party took power in 1933 because he received a special dispensation from the Reich Chamber of Culture. In 1943, he portrayed Captain Smith in Titanic, the first film on the subject which was simply titled Titanic, and the first to combine various fictional characters and subplots with the true events of the sinking; both conventions went on to become a staple of Titanic films. After being cast in 1944 in the propaganda epic Kolberg, he was added to the Gottbegnadeten-Liste, a list of artists considered crucial to Nazi culture which Joseph Goebbels compiled for Adolf Hitler's approval.

== Selected filmography ==
- Girls You Don't Marry (1923)
- Wo Menschen Frieden finden (1923)
- The Searching Soul (1925)
- Mrs Worrington's Perfume (1925) - Philipp Worrington
- The Gambling Den of Montmartre (1928) - Der Apache
- M (1931) - Inspector Karl Lohmann
- Storms of Passion (1932) - Police Commissioner
- Nacht der Versuchung (1932)
- Peter Voss, Thief of Millions (1932) - Pitt
- The Bartered Bride (1932) - Kezal - Heiratsvermittler
- The Naked Truth (1932) - Karl, Lokomotivführer
- The Testament of Dr. Mabuse (1933) - Inspector Karl Lohmann
- Die blonde Christl (1933) - Franz Lechner
- S.A.-Mann Brand (1933) - Herr Brand
- The Tunnel (1933) - Bärmann
- The Fugitive from Chicago (1934) - Wolke, Werkmeister
- Achtung! Wer kennt diese Frau? (1934) - Thomas Burger
- The Switched Bride (1934) - Der Gefängnisdirektor
- Master of the World (1934) - Wolter, Oberingenieur
- Stupid Mama (1934) - Inspektor Beneke
- Between Heaven and Earth (1934) - Motz, Schieferbruchbesitzer
- Peer Gynt (1934) - Parker
- Knockout (1935) - P. F. Schmidtchen
- Ein ganzer Kerl (1935) - Eckhardt, Wiegemeister
- The Valiant Navigator (1935) - Bäckermeister Holm
- Hangmen, Women and Soldiers (1935) - Pieter Timm
- The Merry Wives (1936) - Herr Fluth / Frank Ford
- A Doctor of Conviction (1936) - Geheimrat Grimm, Chefarzt der Klinik
- Street Music (1936) - Godemann - Gastwirt
- The Castle in Flanders (1936) - Bonnet - Agent
- Uncle Bräsig (1936) - Onkel Bräsig
- Dangerous Crossing (1937) - Scheffler - Aufsichtsbeamter
- Wie der Hase läuft (1937) - Warnecke - Ortsvorsteher in Pümpelhausen
- Heimweh (1937) - Stober, Pastor
- Unternehmen Michael (1937) - Der Artillerie-Kommandeur
- Manege (1937) - Jan Morell
- Autobus S (1937) - 'Kapitän' Kröker
- Der Katzensteg (1937) - Gastwirt Merckel
- Starke Herzen (1937) - Ludwig
- Das große Abenteuer (1938) - Kriminalrat
- Stimme des Blutes (1938)
- Mystery About Beate (1938) - Vater Hübner - Schmied
- Wie einst im Mai (1938) - Schradecke, Stellmacher
- Eine Frau kommt in die Tropen (1938) - Verwalter Miller
- Secret Code LB 17 (1938) - Police Commissar Borel
- Northern Lights (1938) - Kaufmann Hansen
- Love Letters from Engadin (1938) - Thomas Viertinger, Hotelier
- Dreizehn Mann und eine Kanone (1938)
- Three Wonderful Days (1939)
- New Year's Eve on Alexanderplatz (1939) - Gast im 'Elite'
- Gold in New Frisco (1939) - Jonathan Pepper
- D III 88 (1939) - Oberwerkmeister Bonicke
- Midsummer Night's Fire (1939) - Vogelreuter
- Der Stammbaum des Dr. Pistorius (1939) - Franz
- Maria Ilona (1939) - Fürst Windischgrätz
- Was wird hier gespielt? (1940)
- Ohm Krüger (1941) - British concentration camp commander
- Friedemann Bach (1941) - Kunde im Musikladen (uncredited)
- Heimkehr (1941) - Old Manz
- The Waitress Anna (1941) - Ludwig Burgstaller
- His Son (1942) - Vater Brugg, Geschäftsführer bei Hellmers
- The Great King (1942) - Oberst Rochow
- The Old Boss (1942) - Georg von Schulte, Pferdezüchter
- Titanic (1943) - Captain Edward J. Smith
- Der große Preis (1944) - Obermeister Kramp
- Seinerzeit zu meiner Zeit (1944) - Amtgerichtsrat Witt
- Life Calls (1944) - Der Vater
- Kolberg (1945) - Bauer Werner
- Kamerad Hedwig (1945) - Fritz Beier
- Der Fall Molander (1945) - Kunsthändler
- Between Yesterday and Tomorrow (1947) - Ministerialdirektor Trunk
- Der Herr vom andern Stern (1948) - General
- Long Is the Road (1949) - Senior Doctor
- Amico (1949) - Robert Kornagel, Konditormeister
- Du bist nicht allein (1949) - Martin Jürgens
- Who Drove the Grey Ford? (1950) - Kriminalkommissar Thieme
- Chased by the Devil (1950) - Herr Dakar
- Die fidele Tankstelle (1950) - Gustav Krause
- Love and Blood (1951)
- Shadows Over Naples (1951) - Pietro
- Sky Without Stars (1955) - Inspektor Hoffmann
- Studentin Helene Willfüer (1956) - Dr. Rainer sr.
- The Captain from Köpenick (1956) - Schuhmachermeister
- Das Sonntagskind (1956) - Willowitz
- The Scarlet Baroness (1959)
- Liebe auf krummen Beinen (1959) - Hausmeister
- Immer die Mädchen (1959) - Diener Adam Fröschl
