= Franz Tappers =

German film producer (1886–1976)

- Born: 10 May 1886
- Died: 20 January 1976 (aged 89); Hamburg, West Germany
- Occupation: Producer
- Years active: 1934–1955 (film)

Franz Tapper or Franz Tappers (1886–1976) was a German film producer.

== Selected filmography ==
- Paganini (1934)
- The Schimeck Family (1935)
- A Woman of No Importance (1936)
- Covered Tracks (1938)
- New Year's Eve on Alexanderplatz (1939)
- The Journey to Tilsit (1939)
- Mistress Moon (1941)
- Pedro Will Hang (1941)
- The Roedern Affair (1944)
- The Dubarry (1951)
- Klettermaxe (1952)
- Weekend in Paradise (1952)
- Don't Forget Love (1953)
- Three from Variety (1954)
- Three Days Confined to Barracks (1955)

== Bibliography ==
- Charles P. Mitchell. The Great Composers Portrayed on Film, 1913 through 2002. McFarland, 2004.
