= Albert Florath =

German actor

- Born: 7 December 1888; Bielefeld, German Empire
- Died: 11 March 1957 (aged 71); Gaildorf, West Germany
- Occupation: actor

Albert Peter Adam Florath (7 December 1888, Bielefeld – 11 March 1957, Gaildorf) was a German stage and film actor.

== Early life and education ==
Born to Joseph Florath, a locksmith, and his wife Matilda, née Burkart, he attended school in Brakel and the Realgymnasium in Paderborn. He embarked on a career as a civil servant in Delbrück, where he was active in the welfare, church and school department and the police administration.

== Acting career ==
Florath gained first stage experience in amateur dramatic groups of local clubs in Delbrück. In 1908, Florath gave up his career in office and went to Munich-Schwabing, to devote himself entirely to acting. He debuted in 1908 as a stage actor at the court theater in Munich. He took acting lessons with Alois Wohlmut and, as a sideline, wrote feuilleton contributions.

When the First World War began, Florath interrupted his artistic career, volunteering as a reserve lieutenant and serving as an instructor of recruits. His wartime experiences caused him to rethink his political views and he turned towards socialism. In 1919, he served as a socialist deputy in the Bavarian National Assembly. After the failure of the Bavarian Soviet Republic and the murder of Kurt Eisner, Florath went to Berlin, where he served from 1920 until 1944 in the ensemble of the National Theatre and also directed. In 1938, Florath was designated as a Staatsschauspieler (i.e. an actor of national importance).

He made his film debut in 1918. With the advent of sound film, Florath established himself as a character actor with mostly grumpy and sometimes quirky, but hearty characters. He played in literary adaptations such as Alfred Döblin's Berlin Alexanderplatz, Gerhart Hauptmann's The Beaver Coat and Henrik Ibsen's Nora, in dramas such as Friedrich Schiller – The Triumph of a Genius (along with Horst Caspar), in comedies such as Die Feuerzangenbowle, but also in Nazi propaganda films such as Ich klage an (1941), Junge Adler (Young Eagles, 1944) and even in Jud Süß.

After the war, he returned to challenging roles, including Love '47 (based on Wolfgang Borchert's drama Draußen vor der Tür (The Man Outside) and next to Curt Goetz in Doctor Praetorius (1950) and The House in Montevideo (1951). He also took roles in the Heimatfilm genre such as Heartbroken on the Moselle (1953) and When the White Lilacs Bloom Again (1953, Romy Schneider's first film).

His last stage station eventually led him to Stuttgart. Florath lived in Schlechtbach, Gschwend, from 1938 until his death in 1957.

== Selected filmography ==
- Danton (1921)
- A Free People (1925)
- The Last Horse Carriage in Berlin (1926) as Wilhelm Lemke
- Gehetzte Frauen (1927)
- Two Under the Stars (1927) as Maitre Latapie
- The Prince of Rogues (1928)
- Napoleon at Saint Helena (1929) as Louis XVIII
- Der lustige Witwer (1929)
- The Street Song (1931)
- Berlin – Alexanderplatz (1931) as Pums
- The Captain from Köpenick (1931) as the keeper
- No Money Needed (1932) as the director of the public bank
- Ripening Youth (1933) as Nehring
- The Gentleman from Maxim's (1933)
- Das Meer ruft (1933)
- The Black Whale (1934) as the capitain
- Love, Death and the Devil (1934) as The Notary
- Hearts are Trumps (1934) as the helmsman
- The King's Prisoner (1935) as Von Archenholtz
- Fruit in the Neighbour's Garden (1935) as Anton Huber
- Donogoo Tonka (1936) as Voisin
- Guten Abend, gute Nacht (1936), as Johannes Brahms
- Glückskinder (1936) as Jackson
- A Woman of No Importance (1936) as Lord Caverstam
- Thunder, Lightning and Sunshine (1936) as Paul Huberding
- Back in the Country (1936)
- Die Austernlilli (1937)
- Capers (1937)
- An Enemy of the People (1937) as Worse
- Diamonds (1937) as the judge
- The Beaver Coat (1937) as Agust Wulkow
- Women for Golden Hill (1938)
- The Roundabouts of Handsome Karl (1938)
- Yvette (1938)
- Five Million Look for an Heir (1938)
- Hurrah! I'm a Father (1939)
- Fortsetzung folgt (1939)
- The Governor (1939)
- Who's Kissing Madeleine? (1939)
- In the Name of the People (1939)
- Alarm at Station III (1939)
- Wibbel the Tailor (1939)
- Bachelor's Paradise (1939)
- Mistake of the Heart (1939)
- A Woman Like You (1939)
- The Journey to Tilsit (1939)
- Angelika (1940)
- The Fox of Glenarvon (1940) as Baron O'Connor
- Das Herz der Königin (1940)
- Friedrich Schiller – Triumph eines Genies (1940) as Pastor Moser
- The Rothschilds (1940) as Baring
- Between Hamburg and Haiti (1940)
- Jud Süß (1940) as Colonel Röder
- Männerwirtschaft (1941)
- The Way to Freedom (1941)
- Friedemann Bach (1941) as the Dresden's restaurateur
- Ich klage an (1941) as Prof. Schlüter
- Clarissa (1941)
- Jakko (1941)
- Sky Hounds (1942)
- Diesel (1942)
- The Big Game (1942)
- Die Erbin vom Rosenhof (1942)
- Voice of the Heart (1942)
- The Old Boss (1942)
- Wenn die Sonne wieder scheint (1943)
- A Waltz with You (1943)
- Immensee (1943)
- Harald Arrives at Nine (1944)
- Die Feuerzangenbowle (1944)
- Nora (1944)
- Young Hearts (1944)
- Via Mala (1945)
- Der Puppenspieler (unvollendet) (1945)
- The Court Concert (1948)
- Liebe 47 (1949)
- Dangerous Guests (1949)
- Nothing But Coincidence (1949)
- I'll Never Forget That Night (1949)
- Derby (1949)
- Second Hand Destiny (1949)
- My Wife's Friends (1949)
- Tobias Knopp – Abenteuer eines Junggesellen (1950, voice)
- Doctor Praetorius (1950)
- Blondes for Export (1950)
- Unknown Sender (1950)
- The Girl from the South Seas (1950)
- Wedding Night In Paradise (1950)
- Gabriela (1950)
- Professor Nachtfalter (1950)
- The Beautiful Galatea (1950)
- This Man Belongs to Me (1950)
- Veronika the Maid (1951)
- Eyes of Love (1951)
- The House in Montevideo (1951)
- Toxi (1952)
- Oh, You Dear Fridolin (1952)
- When the Heath Dreams at Night (1952)
- Once on the Rhine (1952)
- The Imaginary Invalid (1952)
- Roses Bloom on the Moorland (1952)
- Heartbroken on the Moselle (1953)
- Not Afraid of Big Animals (1953)
- Your Heart Is My Homeland (1953)
- Southern Nights (1953)
- When the White Lilacs Bloom Again (1953)
- The Mill in the Black Forest (1953)
- Wedding Bells (1954)
- Columbus Discovers Kraehwinkel (1954)
- The Silent Angel (1954)
- The Beautiful Miller (1954)
- Homesick for Germany (1954)
- Two Blue Eyes (1955)
- The Spanish Fly (1955)
- The Dark Star (1955)
- The Mistress of Solderhof (1955)
- Das Erbe vom Pruggerhof (1955)
- The Forest House in Tyrol (1955)
- Operation Sleeping Bag (1955)
- Three Birch Trees on the Heath (1956)
- Mädchen mit schwachem Gedächtnis (1956)
- Skandal um Dr. Vlimmen (1956)
- Fruit in the Neighbour's Garden (1956)
- A Heart Returns Home (1956)
- If We All Were Angels (1956)
