= Roger von Norman =

German film editor and director

- Born: 4 October 1908; Nevidzén
- Died: 6 May 2000 (aged 91); Icking, Bavaria, Germany
- Occupations: Editor, Director
- Years active: 1932-1952 (film)

Roger von Norman (1908 – 2000) was a Hungarian-born German film editor and director.

== Selected filmography ==
=== Editor ===
- Wrong Number, Miss (1932)
- Manolescu, Prince of Thieves (1933)
- The Tsarevich (1933)
- The Page from the Dalmasse Hotel (1933)
- The Big Chance (1934)
- The Voice of Love (1934)
- The Blonde Carmen (1935)
- The Student of Prague (1935)
- The Czar's Courier (1936)
- Confetti (1936)
- Togger (1937)
- Dangerous Crossing (1937)
- Lightning Around Barbara (1941)

=== Director ===
- The Strange Woman (1939)
- Sky Hounds (1942)
- Derby (1949)

== Bibliography ==
- Richards, Jeffrey. Visions of Yesterday. Routledge & Kegan Paul, 1973.
