= Erich Engels =

German film director and screenwriter

- Born: 23 May 1889; Remscheid, Rhine Province, German Empire
- Died: 25 April 1971 (aged 81); Munich, Bavaria, West Germany
- Occupations: Director, Producer, Writer
- Years active: 1928 - 1963

Erich Engels (23 May 1889 – 25 April 1971) was a German screenwriter, producer and film director.

== Selected filmography ==
- Dear Homeland (1929)
- Rooms to Let (1930)
- The Murderer Dimitri Karamazov (1931)
- The Secret of the Red Cat (1931)
- Secret of the Blue Room (1932)
- At Your Orders, Sergeant (1932)
- Crime Reporter Holm (1932)
- The Roberts Case (1933)
- Peter, Paul and Nanette (1935)
- Fruit in the Neighbour's Garden (1935)
- Thunder, Lightning and Sunshine (1936)
- The Grey Lady (1937)
- The Holm Murder Case (1938)
- In the Name of the People (1939)
- Central Rio (1939)
- Doctor Crippen (1942)
- The Golden Spider (1943)
- Friday the Thirteenth (1949)
- The Secret of the Red Cat (1949)
- The Murder Trial of Doctor Jordan (1949)
- The Lady in Black (1951)
- The Night Without Morals (1953)
- Three Birch Trees on the Heath (1956)
- Fruit in the Neighbour's Garden (1956)
- Widower with Five Daughters (1957)
- Doctor Crippen Lives (1958)
- Father, Mother and Nine Children (1958)
- Of Course, the Motorists (1959)

== Bibliography ==
- Bock, Hans-Michael & Bergfelder, Tim. The Concise CineGraph. Encyclopedia of German Cinema. Berghahn Books, 2009.
