= Terra Film =

German film company

Terra Film was a German film production company based in Berlin. Founded in 1919, it became one of Germany's largest film production companies in the 1930s under the Nazi regime.

== Corporate history ==
The company was founded at end of 1919, initially as a limited liability company and converted into a corporation in October 1920. On 19 July 1922, it acquired the Marienfelde Studios of Eiko Film in the Marienfelde suburb of Berlin.

In 1930, the Swiss Scotoni family, headed by Eugen Scotoni, acquired Terra for 1.2 million Reichsmarks. The Marienfelde Studios were then equipped for sound using the Tobis-Klangfilm system. Many of the forty films from the era of Ralph Scotoni were influenced by Nazi ideas, transfer was also on Swiss materials and locations (William Tell, 1934; The Knight of Pontresina, 1934; Hermione and the Seven Law, 1935). However, since the films lost money, the family sold its stake in Terra Scotoni film in 1935.

In the wake of the nationalization of the film industry in July 1937, Terra-Film Art Ltd. changed its name and was now majority owned by the state-owned Cautio Treuhand GmbH. Terra now produced in the Tempelhof studios of UFA Film Art GmbH. In 1942, Terra was absorbed into Ufa and retained only formal independence.

== Films ==
Terra's first film was The Marriage of Figaro (1920, directed by Max Mack. It was followed by films such as Christian Wahnschaffe (Urban Gad, 1920–21), Bigamy (Jaap Speyer, 1927) and Queen Luise (Karl Grune, 1927/28).

Terra's most active period came after the switch to the talkies and under Nazism. Between 1933 and 1944, Terra released 120 feature films, including propaganda films such as The Riders of German East Africa (1934), Hermine and the Seven Upright Men (1935), Comrades at Sea (1938), Jud Süß (1940), and Front Theatre (1942), but also a successful entertainment films like Circus Renz (1943) and Die Feuerzangenbowle (1944).

== Directors and producers ==
Terra's directors were Boleslaw Barlog, Géza von Bolváry, Peter Paul Brauer, Erich Engels, Kurt Hoffmann, Helmut Käutner, Wolfgang Liebeneiner, Roger von Norman, Rudolf van der Noss, Heinz Paul, Arthur Maria Rabenalt, Günther Rittau, Heinz Rühmann, Herbert Selpin, Hans Steinhoff and Helmut Weiss.

A number of producers at Terra had their own production units; these included Helmut Beck (Mosel trip with Monika), Gustaf Gründgens (Friedemann Bach), Eduard Kubat (Doctor Crippen, The golden spider), Otto Lehmann (Jud Süß, Front Theatre), Heinz Rühmann (The Florentine hat, Quax the Crash Pilot, Quax in Africa, Die Feuerzangenbowle), Viktor von Struve (Opera Ball, Roses in Tyrol, Andreas Schlüter, The Bat), EC Techow (Rembrandt), Hans Tost (What, you know still don't know Korff?, we make music, Great Freedom No. 7) and Walter Tost (In the name of the people, Blood Brothers, Circus Renz).

== Sources ==
- Kramer, Thomas; Siegrist, Dominik (1991). Terra: A Swiss film company in the Third Reich. Zurich: Chronos. ISBN 978-3-905278-73-6.
- Hervé Dumont. history of Swiss film. Lausanne 1987
