= The Golden Bullet =

The Golden Bullet can refer to:

- The Golden Bullet (1917 film), a 1917 American film
- The Golden Bullet (1921 film), a 1921 German film
