= Leila Negra =

Afro-German singer and actress (1930–2025)

- Born: Marie Nejar; 20 March 1930; Mülheim, Weimar Republic
- Died: 11 May 2025 (aged 95); Hamburg, Germany
- Occupations: Singer; actress

Marie Nejar (20 March 1930 – 11 May 2025), known professionally as Leila Negra was a German singer and actress of African descent. She began her career as a child film actor in the 1940s, became a singer after World War II, and left performing in the late 1950s to become a nurse.

== Background ==
Leila Negra was born Marie Nejar in Mülheim an der Ruhr, Germany, on 20 March 1930. Her father was a black sailor out of Liverpool, England, who originally came from Ghana; he saw his daughter only a few times. Her mother, Cécilie, was the daughter of a white German woman and a creole man from the island of Martinique. Cécilie was initially disowned by her family on account of her interracial relationship. She concealed her pregnancy from her family and placed Marie in an orphanage when she was born. When Marie was three years old, Cécilie removed her from the orphanage and they moved to Hamburg to be near Cécilie's mother, with whom Cécilie had reconciled. Cécilie, who worked as a musician, bled to death following an abortion when Marie was 10 years old and Marie was then cared for by her maternal grandmother.

Marie grew up in the Hamburg docklands neighbourhood of St. Pauli. When the National Socialists came to power, she was exposed to hostility because of her dark skin. Due to the Nuremberg Race Laws of 1935, she was unable to finish her education and instead had to do forced labour in a factory. By her own account, she survived the early years of Nazism with the help of sympathetic people in her community, including some of the local policemen; later her appearances in Nazi propaganda films offered some protection.

Nejar died in Hamburg on 11 May 2025, at the age of 95.

== Career ==
Her film career as a performer began as a result of a search instigated by Joseph Goebbels, the German Minister of Propaganda, for black children who could play African natives in various films being made by UFA, which had been taken over by the Nazis in 1933. Nejar first appeared in the 1943 fantasy film Münchhausen, performing as a black servant with a fan. Only 12 years old when the film was shot, she did not realize it was propaganda and was happy to have two weeks off from school and earn some money.

During the post-war years, she worked at a bar in the winter and as a cigarette girl at a resort in the summer. Asked to test a microphone one evening for other performers, she impressed the audience and the musicians with her talent and started a career as a singer. It was at this time that she adopted the stage name Leila Negra. Even though she was already 20, when she got a contract with a record company, she was promoted as a "15-year-old child" star. Over the next decade, she had a number of hit songs, including the title song from the 1952 film Toxi, which was about the first wave of children born to black Allied servicemen and white German mothers. She was the first to record the Gerhard Winkler song "Mütterlein" (English equivalent: Mommy), which subsequently became a hit for both Frankie Laine and David Whitfield with English lyrics under the title "Answer Me, My Love". She toured with the well-known Austrian singer Peter Alexander, as well as with other musicians.

== See also ==
- Afro-Germans – People with African roots living or born in Germany
- Hans Massaquoi – Afro-German-American author (1926–2013)
- Theodor Wonja Michael – German journalist (1925–2019)
