= Zombor =

Zombor can refer to:

- Zombor (Зомбор), a Hungarian and Rusyn name for Sombor, a city in Serbia
- Zombor, Veľký Krtíš District, a village in Slovakia.
