= Josef von Báky =

Hungarian filmmaker

- Born: 23 March 1902; Zombor, Austro-Hungarian Empire
- Died: 28 July 1966 (aged 64); Munich, West Germany
- Occupation: Actor
- Years active: 1929–1961 (film)

Josef von Báky (23 March 1902, Zombor, Austria-Hungary – 28 July 1966, Munich, West Germany) was a Hungarian filmmaker. He was also known as Josef v. Baky and József Báky. Báky was born in the village of Zobor in the Kingdom of Hungary (today Zombor, Slovakia). He worked as an assistant to Géza von Bolváry.

He worked as director or producer on no less than 48 films. He died in Munich, Bavaria, West Germany.

Báky's best known film is Münchhausen, which was released in 1943. It is a fantasy-comedy and is noted for how it avoids politics of its time. The film was ordered by Nazi propaganda minister Joseph Goebbels to celebrate the 25th anniversary of UFA and to compete with Hollywood productions.

== Selected filmography ==
- Intermezzo (1936)
- The Great and the Little Love (1938)
- The Woman at the Crossroads (1938)
- Stars of Variety (German-language version, 1939)
  - A varieté csillagai (Hungarian-language version, 1939)
- Her First Experience (1939)
- Small Town Poet (1940)
- Annelie (1941)
- Münchhausen (1943)
- Via Mala (1945)
- And the Heavens Above Us (1947)
- The Last Illusion (1949)
- Die seltsame Geschichte des Brandner Kaspar (1949)
- Two Times Lotte (1950)
- Dreaming Lips (1953)
- Diary of a Married Woman (1953)
- Du bist die Richtige (co-director: Erich Engel, 1955)
- Hotel Adlon (1955)
- Dunja (1955)
- Drayman Henschel (1956)
- The Girl and the Legend (1957)
- Precocious Youth (1957)
- Confess, Doctor Corda (1958)
- Stefanie (1958)
- The Man Who Sold Himself (1959)
- The Ideal Woman (1959)
- Marili (1959)
- Storm in a Water Glass (1960)
- The Strange Countess (1961)
