= Her First Experience =

1939 film

- German: Ihr erstes Erlebnis
- Directed by: Josef von Báky
- Written by: Susanne Kerckhoff (novel); Juliane Kay
- Produced by: Eberhard Schmidt
- Starring: Ilse Werner; Johannes Riemann; Charlott Daudert
- Cinematography: Robert Baberske; Werner Bohne
- Edited by: Berndt von Tyszka
- Music by: Georg Haentzschel
- Production company: UFA
- Distributed by: UFA
- Release date: 22 December 1939
- Running time: 90 minutes
- Country: Germany
- Language: German

Her First Experience (German: Ihr erstes Erlebnis) is a 1939 German romance film directed by Josef von Báky and starring Ilse Werner, Johannes Riemann and Charlott Daudert.

The film's sets were designed by the art director Willy Schiller. Location filming took place in Berlin and Schleswig-Holstein.

== Plot ==
An art student falls madly in love with her Professor, threatening his marriage.

== Cast ==
- Ilse Werner as Marianne Schäfer
- Johannes Riemann as Professor Brenner
- Charlott Daudert as Josephine
- Elisabeth Lennartz as Lore Brenner
- Majan Lex as Else
- Walter Ladengast as Gohlke
- Volker von Collande as Jochen
- Tonio Riedl as Paul
- Jeanette Bethge as Frau Mertens
- Vera Complojer as Gasthofswirtin
- Erich Dunskus as Autobusschaffner
- Paul Ludwig Frey as Brenner's companion
- Karl Harbacher as Mr. Bohlemann
- Maria Hofen as passenger on the bus
- Alfred Karen as Brenner's acquaintance
- Walter Lieck as passenger on the bus
- Maria Loja as Mrs. Meyer
- Käte Pontow as Fränze
- Margarete Schön as Mother Schäfer
- Dorothea Thiess as Frau Bröse
- Georg Thomalla as Otto
- Edith von Donat as Mädchen bei Brenner
- Elsa Wagner as Grandmother
- Franz Weber as Georg Schäfer
