= A Salzburg Comedy =

1943 film

- Directed by: Hans Deppe
- Written by: Erich Kästner
- Produced by: Eberhard Schmidt; Hans Schönmetzler
- Starring: Willy Fritsch; Hertha Feiler; Heinz Salfner; Hilde Sessak
- Cinematography: Kurt Schulz
- Edited by: Conrad von Molo
- Music by: Ludwig Schmidseder
- Production company: UFA
- Distributed by: Deutsche Filmvertriebs
- Release date: 22 April 1943
- Running time: 83 minutes
- Country: Nazi Germany
- Language: German

A Salzburg Comedy or Little Border Traffic (German: Der kleine Grenzverkehr) is a 1943 German comedy film directed by Hans Deppe and starring Willy Fritsch, Hertha Feiler and Heinz Salfner. Erich Kästner wrote the screenplay based on one of his own novels. As he had been blacklisted by the Nazi Party, he used the pseudonym Berhold Bürger. The novel was again adapted for the 1957 film Salzburg Stories.

Although it was set in Austria, the film was not made by the Vienna-based Wien-Film which had been set up following the Anschluss of 1938. Instead it was produced by the dominant German studio UFA and shot at the Tempelhof Studios in Berlin. The film's sets were designed by the art director Walter Röhrig. Location shooting took place at Bad Reichenhall and Salzburg towards the end of 1942. It was premiered in Frankfurt, while the first Berlin screening took place at the Marmorhaus.

== Cast ==
- Willy Fritsch as Georg Rentmeister
- Hertha Feiler as Konstanze
- Heinz Salfner as Leopold
- Hilde Sessak as Jutta
- Charlott Daudert as Doris
- Peter Widmann as Karl Kesselhut, Maler
- Louis Soldan as Franz-Xaver von Raitenau
- Auguste Pünkösdy as Karoline
- Inge Drexel as Mizzi
- Charlotte Schultz as Frau Dirksen
- Hans Leibelt as Herr Dirksen
- Hans Richter as Detlef
- Elise Aulinger as Eine Bedienstete des Grafen
- Julius Brandt as Eine Bedienstete des Grafen
- Rudolf Brix as Fred, Tanzgigolo
- Heinz Burkart as Der Lehrer, ein Tourist, dem der Steinwurf nicht galt
- Angelo Ferrari as Der Kellner im italienischen Weinlokal
- Erich Fiedler as Dr. Bürger, ein Freund Georgs
- Lutz Götz as Dr. Bürger, ein Freund Georgs
- Max Gülstorff as Der Geheimrat
- Karl Hellmer as Der Zollbeamte im Bus
- Leopold Kerscher as Ein Bediensteter des Grafen
- Sonja Kuska as Die Verkäuferin im Salzburger Hutgeschäft
- Maria Loja as Eine Marktstandverkäuferin
- Ernst Martens as Der Hotelier in Bad Reichenhall
- Marianne Probstmeier as Ein Zimmermädchen
- Claire Reigbert as Die Frau des Lehrers
- Else Reval as Tanzpartnerin vom Gigolo Fred
- Ferdinand Robert as Ein Gast im Hotelrestaurant
- Hans Schulz as Der Lohndiener im Hotel
- Franz Weber as Sekretär
- Ewald Wenck as Tetzlaff, Obersekretär der deutschen Devisenstelle
- Carl Wery as Der Tourist mit dem Fernglas

== Bibliography ==
- Hake, Sabine. Popular Cinema of the Third Reich. University of Texas Press, 2001.
- Eric, Rentschler. The Ministry of Illusion: Nazi Cinema and Its Afterlife. Harvard University Press, 1996.
