= The Appeal to Conscience =

1949 film directed by Karl Anton

- Directed by: Karl Anton
- Written by: Herbert Engelsing; Jacob Geis; Vring Wiemer
- Produced by: Karl Anton; Robert Wüllner
- Starring: Karl Ludwig Diehl; Werner Hinz; Gustav Diessl
- Cinematography: Herbert Körner
- Edited by: Johanna Meisel
- Music by: Franz R. Friedl
- Production company: Tobis Film
- Distributed by: Sovexport Film (East Germany); Lloyd Film (West Germany)
- Release date: 11 October 1949 (Austria)
- Running time: 92 minutes
- Country: Germany
- Language: German

The Appeal to Conscience (German: Ruf an das Gewissen) is a 1949 German mystery film directed by Karl Anton and starring Karl Ludwig Diehl, Werner Hinz and Gustav Diessl. It was originally shot in 1944, but remained uncompleted until it was finished by DEFA in the post-war era. It remained unreleased until it was given a 1949 premiere in Austria. Subsequently it was distributed in East Germany in 1950 and West Germany in 1951.

It was produced by Tobis Film, one of the dominant companies of the Nazi era. It was shot in Studios in German-occupied Prague, with some location filming taking place around the city. The film's sets were designed by the art directors Gustav A. Knauer and Fritz Lück.

== Synopsis ==
A celebrated crime writer solves a ten-year-old cold murder case.

== Cast ==
- Karl Ludwig Diehl as Kriminalrat Husfeld
- Werner Hinz as Volkmar Hollberg, Schrifsteller
- Gustav Diessl as Dr. Gregor Karpinski
- Käthe Haack as Helga Andree
- Marina von Ditmar as Ingrid Andree
- Anneliese Uhlig as Senora de la Serna
- Andrews Engelmann as Jan Puchalla
- Hilde Hildebrand as Meta Puchalla
- Harald Paulsen as Korfiz
- Elisabeth Markus as Frau Hamborn
- Herbert Hübner as Gröner
- Hans Stiebner as Wituschek
- Walter Janssen
- Karl Hannemann
- Walter Werner
- Siegfried Niemann
- Anneliese von Eschstruth
- Werner Pledath

== See also ==
- Überläufer

== Bibliography ==
- Davidson, John & Hake, Sabine. Framing the Fifties: Cinema in a Divided Germany. Berghahn Books, 2007.
