= All Because of the Dog =

1935 film

- Directed by: Fred Sauer
- Written by: Dr. Lohmeyer; Max Wallner
- Produced by: Erich Schicker; Karl Schulz; Robert Wüllner
- Starring: Weiß Ferdl; Julia Serda; Edith Oß; Waldemar Spann-Müller
- Cinematography: Georg Krause
- Edited by: Marianne Behr
- Music by: Max Pflugmacher
- Production companies: Schulz & Wuellner Film
- Distributed by: Tobis-Sascha Film (Austria)
- Release date: 29 August 1935
- Running time: 87 minutes
- Country: Nazi Germany
- Language: German

All Because of the Dog (German: Alles weg'n dem Hund) is a 1935 German comedy film directed by Fred Sauer and starring Weiß Ferdl, Julia Serda and Edith Oß. Location shooting took place around Munich and Tegernsee. The film's sets were designed by the art directors Otto Guelstorff and Hans Minzloff.

== Cast ==
- Weiß Ferdl as Sebastian Neumeyer, Postassistent
- Julia Serda as Cilly Neumeyer, seine Frau
- Edith Oß as Anny, seine Tochter
- Waldemar Spann-Müller as Schorschi, sein Sohn
- Heinz Dugall as Pepi, sein Sohn
- Peter Bosse as Der kleine Hansl, sein Jüngster
- Otto Sauter-Sarto as Hölzinger, Postmeister
- Trude Hesterberg as Lottchen, seine Frau
- Dieter Borsche as Franz, beider Sohn
- Willi Schaeffers as Pilzer, Notar
- Robert Jungk as Jean, Diener
- Irene Andor as Schmederer, Bäckermeisterin
- Wolfgang von Schwindt as Apotheker
- Otto Kronburger as Zimmermann, Neumeyers Kollege
- Lucie Euler as Frau Schwiebus
- Egon Brosig as Geier, Auktionator
- Vera Hartegg as Zenzi
- Else Lüders as Baumeisterin
- Karl Harbacher as 1. Gast im Restaurant
- Heinz Herkommer as 2. Gast im Restaurant
- Irene Hübner as Gast bei Frau Hölzinger
- Leo Peukert as Tierarzt
- Norma Wellhoff as Frau mit Hund

== Bibliography ==
- Hake, Sabine (2001). Popular Cinema of the Third Reich. Austin: University of Texas Press. ISBN 978-0-292-73458-6.
