= Hilde Hildebrand =

German actress and singer (1897–1976)

- Born: Emma Minna Hilde Hildebrand; 10 September 1897; Hanover, German Empire
- Died: 27 May 1976 (aged 78); Grunewald, West Germany
- Occupations: Singer, stage actress, film actress

Emma Minna Hilde Hildebrand (10 September 1897 – 12 May 1976) was a German actress born in Hanover, Germany on 10 September 1897. She died at the age of 78 in Grunewald, Berlin, on 27 May 1976.

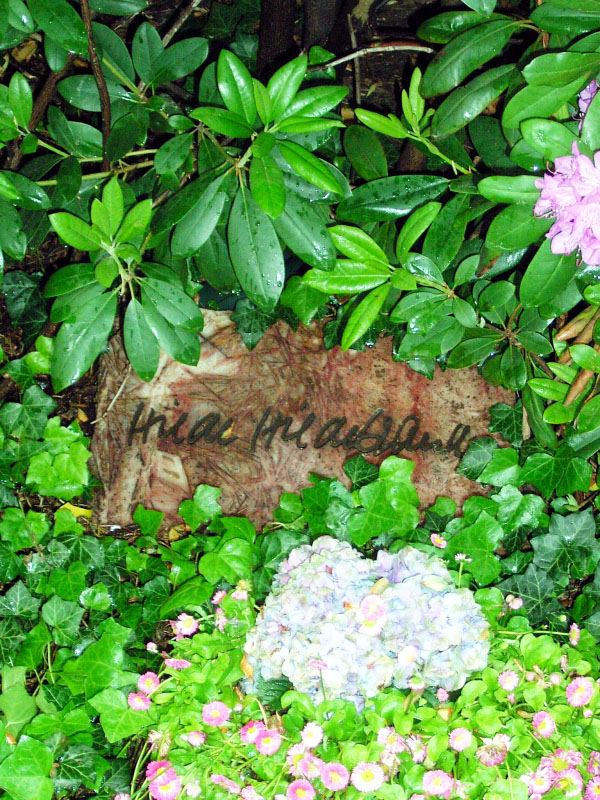
Hilde Hildebrand's grave at the Friedhof Heerstraße in Berlin in 2006.

== Selected filmography ==
- Die Scheidungsehe (1920, Short)
- Der Herr Papa - Else (1921)
- Es bleibt in der Familie (1922, Short) as Schauspielerin Molly
- Schwarzwaldkinder (1922) as Liesbeth, Tochter von Nikodemus Grieshaber
- Lohengrins Heirat (1922) as Elsa
- Hotel zum goldenen Engel (1922) as Ella
- Der Herr Landrat (1922) as Molli Jolli
- The Dealer from Amsterdam (1925) as Susi
- Sechs Mädchen suchen Nachtquartier (1928)
- The Gallant Hussar (1928) Vilma von Noszty
- Rasputins Liebesabenteuer (1928) Dirne Gregubowa
- Meine Frau, seine Frau (1931, Short)
- Different Morals (1931) Cora Petry
- The Fate of Renate Langen (1931) as Marion
- Arme, kleine Eva! (1931) as Erna Steindamm
- Panic in Chicago (1931) as Susy Owen
- The Little Escapade (1931) as Lona Wernecke, seine Frau
- Bobby Gets Going (1931) as Olga Loty
- Madame Makes Her Exit (1931) as Eva - die Freundin
- My Leopold (1931) as Rosita
- The Unknown Guest (1931) as Ita Hanna
- The Ladies Diplomat (1932) as Olga seine Frau
- The Beautiful Adventure (1932) as Frau de Serignon
- Strafsache van Geldern (1932)
- Drei von der Kavallerie (1932) as Lola von Heldburg
- Ballhaus goldener Engel (1932)
- The Importance of Being Earnest (1932)
- When Love Sets the Fashion (1932) as Suzanne
- Impossible Love (1932) as Frl. Martini
- Ein Lied für Dich (1933)
- Moral und Liebe (1933) as Lissy
- Manolescu, Prince of Thieves (1933) as Marion Lamond
- Jumping Into the Abyss (1933) as Eva Volkmann
- Greetings and Kisses, Veronika (1933) as Klara Becker, seine Frau
- D. K. 1 greift ein (1933) as Olly
- Ways to a Good Marriage (1933) as Eugenie von Bergen, die nymphomanische Frau
- Love Must Be Understood (1933) as Ellen Parker, seine Braut
- Keine Angst vor Liebe (1933) as Frau Bobrinski
- Gretel Wins First Prize (1933) as Gerda, seine geschiedene Frau
- Viktor und Viktoria (1933) as Ellinor
- My Heart Calls You (1934) as Margot
- Pipin der Kurze (1934) as Rita, Schauspielerin
- Little Dorrit (1934) as Lily, seine Tochter
- Polish Blood (1934) as Wanda Kwasinskaja
- The English Marriage (1934) as Bella Amery
- Peter, Paul and Nanette (1935) as Mary
- Ein falscher Fuffziger (1935) as Frau Strachwitz
- Barcarole (1935) as Ludovisca
- Artisten (1935) as Vera Leander
- Amphitryon (1935) as 1. Freundin Alkmenes
- The Private Life of Louis XIV (1935) as Duchesse de Montespan
- The King's Prisoner (1935) as Fräulein von Mallwitz
- I Was Jack Mortimer (1935) as Daisy
- His Late Excellency (1935) as Baronin v. Windegg
- The Czar's Courier (1936) as Zangara, Ogareff's mistress
- Die letzte Fahrt der Santa Margareta (1936) as Miß Mabel Glann
- Tomfoolery (1936) as Aimée
- Fräulein Veronika (1936) as Dora
- Maria the Maid (1936) as Actress Alice Winter
- Doctor Engel (1936) as Mutter eines Kindes im Krankenhaus
- Madona in Warenhaus (1936)
- Mother Song (1937) as Ricarda Doret, seine Frau
- Es leuchten die Sterne (1938) as Singer
- The Girl of Last Night (1938) as Lady Darnmore
- The Day After the Divorce (1938) as Susi Lang
- Dance on the Volcano (1938) as Gräfin X
- The Green Emperor (1939) as Nora
- Bel Ami (1939) as Clotilde von Marelle
- New Year's Eve on Alexanderplatz (1939) as Madeleine
- Parkstraße 13 (1939) as Baronin Bornegg
- Marriage in Small Doses (1939) as Frau Conradi
- Das Glück wohnt nebenan (1939)
- Frau nach Maß (1940) as Hermine Campe
- My Daughter Doesn't Do That (1940) as Sängerin
- Small Town Poet (1940) as Lona Elvira
- Alarm (1941) as Pensionsinhaberin Frau Anders
- Jenny und der Herr im Frack (1941) as Lilly Hegedüsch
- Die heimlichen Bräute (1942) as Daniela Dannenberg Sängerin
- Journey into the Past (1943) as Lily, Carlos Frau
- Die schwache Stunde (1943) as Roxy
- Spiel (1944)
- Große Freiheit Nr. 7 (1944) as Anita
- Spiel mit der Liebe (1944)
- Ich bitte um Vollmacht (1944) as Sängerin Daniela Dannberg
- The Appeal to Conscience (1945)
- Ghost in the Castle (1947) as Camilla
- Der Herr vom andern Stern (1948) as Jeanette
- The Appeal to Conscience (1949) as Meta Puchalla
- Kätchen für alles (1949) as Maria
- Law of Love (1949) as Signora Rinuccini
- Kleiner Wagen – große Liebe (1949)
- Schuß um Mitternacht (1950) as Schauspielerin Elvira
- Verlobte Leute (1950) as Frau Rehbein - die Portiersfrau
- The Orplid Mystery (1950) as Mrs. Eleanor Hoopman
- Glück muß man haben (1950) as Mademoiselle Yvonne
- The Tiger Akbar (1951) as Madame Regina, Kunstreiterin
- Immortal Light (1951) as Madame de Latour
- The Guilt of Doctor Homma (1951) as Frau Burde
- She (1954) as Nachbarin
- The Three from the Filling Station (1954)
- Pariser Geschichten (1956)
- Adorable Arabella (1959) as Lady Bridlington
- Carnival Confession (1960) as Mme. Guttier
- The Threepenny Opera (1963) as Celia Peachum

=== Television ===
- 1957: Weekend (TV film)
- 1958: César (TV film) - Honorine, Fannys Mutter
- 1958: Colombe (TV film) - Madame Alexandre
- 1959: The Abduction of the Sabine Women (TV film) - Friedrike Gollwitz
- 1961: Einladung ins Schloß (TV film) - Madame Desmermortes
- 1962: Nicht zuhören, meine Damen! (TV film) - Julie Bille en Bois
- 1962: Überfahrt (TV film) - Mrs. Cliveden-Banks
- 1963: Heiraten ist immer ein Risiko (TV film) - Lydia Barbent
- 1964: Bis ans Ende (TV film) - Agatha Payne
- 1969: Katzenzungen (TV film) - Tante Fini
- 1971: Der Kommissar: Der Moormörder (TV series episode) - Frau Steger
- 1971: Wölfe und Schafe (TV film) - Meropa Mursawetzkaja
- 1972: Das System Fabrizzi (TV film) - Signora Sartori (final film role)
