= Liberated Hands =

1939 film

- Directed by: Hans Schweikart
- Written by: Erich Ebermayer (novel); Kurt Heuser
- Produced by: Curt Prickler
- Starring: Brigitte Horney; Olga Chekhova; Ewald Balser; Carl Raddatz
- Cinematography: Carl Hoffmann; Heinz Schnackertz
- Edited by: Johanna Schmidt
- Music by: Lothar Brühne
- Production company: Bavaria Film
- Distributed by: Bavaria Film
- Release date: 20 December 1939
- Running time: 99 minutes
- Country: Germany
- Language: German

Liberated Hands or Freed Hands (German: Befreite Hände) is a 1939 German drama film directed by Hans Schweikart and starring Brigitte Horney, Olga Chekhova and Ewald Balser. It was shot at the Bavaria Studios in Munich and on location in Husum and Capri. The film's sets were designed by the art director Wilhelm Depenau and Ludwig Reiber. It was screened at the 8th Venice International Film Festival.

== Synopsis ==
Dürthen a talented woodcarver living in a rural village, feels stifled by her unhappy relationship and suppressed artistic potential. Seeking a new life, she moves to Berlin to formally develop her craft. Her journey eventually takes her to Italy, where the vibrant cultural atmosphere transforms her from a simple craftswoman into a sophisticated sculptor. Along the way, she asserts her independence by rejecting traditional marriage proposals that would compromise her career. Finally, under the mentorship of a master artist, she achieves professional fulfilment and "frees her hands" to create her greatest work.

== Cast ==
- Brigitte Horney as Dürthen, Schafhirtin
- Olga Chekhova as Kerstin Thomas
- Ewald Balser as Professor Wolfram
- Carl Raddatz as Graf Joachim von Erken
- Paul Dahlke as Thomsen
- Eduard von Winterstein as Gutsbesitzer von Erken
- Franz Weber as Bergh, Diener
- Hedwig Wangel as Frau Steinmann
- Erna Sellmer as Pastorin
- Otto Brefin as Pastor
- Erika Helmke as Carla
- Luise Hohorst as Tante Mathilde
- Vera Hartegg as Josefa
- Albert Lippert as Van Daalen
- Alfred Maack as Postmeister
- Georg Schmieter as Harms
- Ernst Joachim Schlieper as Leuthold
- Herbert Knoll as Portier
- Haenschen Pfaff as Pfaff

== Bibliography ==
- Hake, Sabine (2001). Popular Cinema of the Third Reich. University of Texas Press. ISBN 978-0-292-73458-6.
