= Ewald Balser =

German actor (1898–1978)

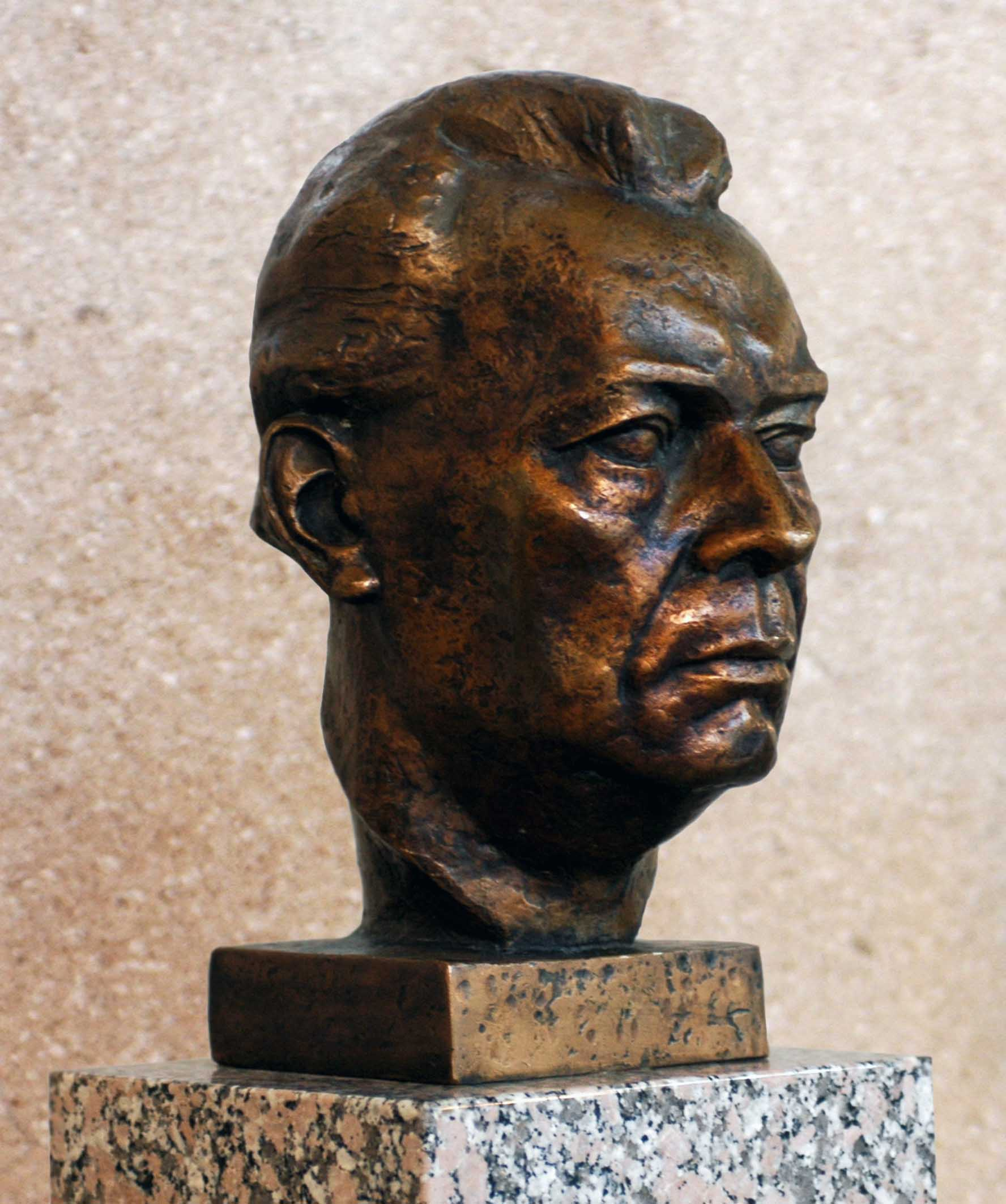
- Born: 5 October 1898; Elberfeld, Germany
- Died: 17 April 1978 (aged 79); Vienna, Austria
- Occupation: Actor
- Years active: 1935–1975

Ewald Balser (5 October 1898 – 17 April 1978) was a German film actor. He appeared in more than 50 films between 1935 and 1975. He was born in Elberfeld, Germany and died in Vienna, Austria.

== Partial filmography ==
- Jana, the Girl from the Bohemian Forest (1935) - Peter
- The Woman at the Crossroads (1938) - Prof. Henrici
- Detours to Happiness (1939) - Thomas Bracht
- Die unheimlichen Wünsche (1939) - Pertignac, Kunsthändler, Rafaéls Freund
- Liberated Hands (1939) - Professor Wolfram
- Der Weg zu Isabel (1940) - Manfred Corner
- The Masked Lover (1940)
- The Girl from Barnhelm (1940) - Major von Telheim
- Ehe man Ehemann wird (1941) - Prof. Hellwig
- Rembrandt (1942) - Rembrandt
- The Dark Day (1943) - Wolf Burkhardt
- Ein glücklicher Mensch (1943) - Professor Lorenz
- Gabriele Dambrone (1943) - Georg Hollberg
- Der Scheiterhaufen (1945) - Amtsricher Dr. Martin
- Glaube an mich (1946) - Prof. Franz Wiesinger
- The Trial (1948) - Dr. Eötvös
- Eroica (1949) - Ludwig van Beethoven
- The Lie (1950) - Dr. Thomas Robertsen, Susannes Mann
- Furioso (1950) - Professor Soldin
- Der Wallnerbub (1950) - Pfarrer
- Das gestohlene Jahr (1951) - Dirigent Olav Svendström
- Sensation in San Remo (1951) - Prof. Feldmann
- Don't Ask My Heart (1952) - Gerichts-Vorsitzender
- Sauerbruch – Das war mein Leben (1954) - Dr.Ferdinand Sauerbruch
- Children, Mother, and the General (1955) - General
- Espionage (1955) - Oberst Redl
- The Doctor's Secret (1955) - Prof. Stephan Wendlandt
- Sarajevo (1955) - Erzherzog Franz Ferdinand
- Goetz von Berlichingen (1955) - Götz von Berlichingen
- Versuchung (1955) - Prof. Marko Brand
- Wilhelm Tell (1956) - Wilhelm Tell
- Vater, unser bestes Stück (1957) - Prof. Wilhelm Keller
- Night Nurse Ingeborg (1958) - Prof. Burger
- The Green Devils of Monte Cassino (1958) - Lt. Col. Julius Schlegel
- It Happened in Broad Daylight (1958) - Professor Manz
- Petersburger Nächte (1958) - Iwan Iwanowitsch
- One Should Be Twenty Again (1958) - Friedrich Hoffmann
- Ohne Mutter geht es nicht (1958) - Prof. Wilhelm Keller
- The House of Three Girls (1958) - Ludwig van Beethoven
- The Priest and the Girl (1958) - Bischof
- Arzt ohne Gewissen (1959) - Prof. Lund
- Glocken läuten überall (1960) - Bischof
- Don Carlos (1960) - Philipp II.
- The Cry of the Wild Geese (1961) - Caleb Gare
- Jedermann (1961) - Die Stimme des Herrn
- Leutnant Gustl (1963, TV film) - Oberst Brunnthaler
