= Münchhausen (1943 film) =

1943 German film by Josef von Báky

- Directed by: Josef von Báky
- Written by: Erich Kästner
- Based on: Baron Munchausen's Narrative of his Marvellous Travels and Campaigns in Russia by Rudolf Erich Raspe
- Produced by: Eberhard Schmidt
- Starring: Hans Albers; Wilhelm Bendow
- Cinematography: Konstantin Irmen-Tschet; Werner Krien
- Music by: Georg Haentzschel
- Distributed by: Universum Film A.G. (Ufa)
- Release date: 3 March 1943
- Running time: 132 minutes (premiere)
- Country: Germany
- Language: German
- Budget: 6.5 million ℛℳ (equivalent to €26.6 million in 2009)
- Box office: 8 million ℛℳ (equivalent to €32.7 million in 2009)

Münchhausen is a 1943 German fantasy comedy film directed by Josef von Báky. Science fiction author David Wingrove has commented that this work "sidesteps immediate political issues whilst conjuring up marvellous visual images of an ageless pastoral Germany."

== Plot ==
The film opens at an 18th-century ball, where Baron Hieronymus von Münchhausen is propositioned by a young woman who is engaged to another man. He graciously rejects her advance, and as she leaves, she asks him to turn on the light. The camera follows his hand to a modern light switch, and the young woman drives off in an automobile. The next day, the Baron, out of his costume and in modern dress, regales the young woman and her fiancé with stories of the famous Baron Münchhausen, to whom his guests think he is distantly related.

He begins in his home town of Bodenwerder, back from an adventure with his trusted servant Christian Kuchenreutter, who has invented a gun that can shoot accurately at a distance of 100 miles. The sorcerer Cagliostro visits, and asks the Baron to join him in a quest to take over the throne of Poland. The Baron declines, explaining that he has no interest in power, just in adventure.

In St. Petersburg, the Baron joins the court of Catherine the Great. She offers to appoint him to be her general aide-de-camp and install him in a room below hers, with a secret elevator between the two so that they can carry on their affair. He agrees to stay until one of them wants more freedom. While in her court, the Baron clashes with Prince Potemkin. The pair fight a "cuckoo duel" in a darkened room, where one party is obliged to call "cuckoo" while the other aims and fires a pistol at the sound of his opponent's voice. The Baron is wounded in the duel and he goes to Cagliostro, who has recently arrived in St. Petersburg, to tend to the wound. While there, the Baron warns Cagliostro of his impending arrest. After healing the Baron, Cagliostro asks him what he desires most of all, since money and power do not interest him. The Baron answers that he wishes to be as young as he is at that moment, for as long as he desires. Cagliostro grants his wish.

On the Turkish front, Potemkin lights a cannon while the Baron sits astride it. The Baron rides the cannonball over to the Turkish palace, where he is enslaved along with an Italian princess. After two months as a slave, the Baron is reunited with Kuchenreutter and his runner, Der Läufer, who can cover hundreds of miles in a matter of minutes. He makes a wager for his and the princess's freedom with the king, wherein his runner must retrieve some Tokay wine from Vienna within an hour. After winning the bet, the king tries to pass off a counterfeit princess on the Baron. Incensed, he slips on a ring that makes him invisible and absconds with the princess.

The pair escape to Venice, where her brother is offended by her dalliance with the Baron. He challenges the Baron to a duel with rapiers. The Baron humiliates the brother, leaving him suicidal. The Baron and Kuchenreutter escape in a hot air balloon, which takes them to the Moon. On the Moon, they marvel at how time moves so swiftly: while Münchhausen does not change at all, Kuchenreutter ages rapidly. They meet two inhabitants of the Moon, one of whom moves about as a disembodied head. She explains to the Baron how no Earthlings can last more than a day on the Moon before they dry up in smoke and blow away. However, before the Baron can leave the Moon, Kuchenreutter has a heart attack and dies in his arms, disappearing in a puff of smoke.

As the Baron finishes his tale, his guests correct him on some of its historical inaccuracies, citing the fact that the real Baron died before some of the events took place. This prompts the Baron to confess that he is in fact the same man as the legend, and that he has been married happily to his wife for 40 years. Unnerved by his admission, the guests quickly leave. The Baron's wife begs him to flee, as he usually does when his escapades get out of control, upset that he has confessed the truth. The Baron refuses to go, and instead, he revokes Cagliostro's gift. He immediately ages to match the advanced years of his wife.

== History ==
Nazi Propaganda Minister Joseph Goebbels ordered the production of Münchhausen in order to celebrate the 25th anniversary of the UFA film studio which released it. The Jubiläumsfilm, or anniversary film, was commissioned by Goebbels, and Fritz Hippler was chosen to oversee the film's production. Hippler, who was instated as Reichsfilmdramaturg in 1939 by Goebbels, shared his view that all artistic disciplines, including film, should be "co-ordinated" to echo the propaganda themes that the regime chose to highlight, following the policy of Gleichschaltung.

Münchhausen represented the pinnacle of the Volksfilm style of propaganda designed to entertain the masses and distract the population from the war, borrowing the Hollywood genre of large budget productions with extensive colorful visuals. The release of the Technicolor film The Wizard of Oz in the United States was a heavy influence for Goebbels. By 1940 the German research laboratory Agfa was producing its own version of colored film that had “caught up with the Americans in [color cinematography]” according to Goebbels’ diary.

Münchhausen was the third feature film made in Germany using the new Agfacolor negative-positive material. Hippler and Ufa's production group manager Eberhard Schmidt hired Erich Kästner for the screenplay, a decision met with controversy as several of Kästner's previous works such as Fabian were banned after 1933 when the Nazi party began heavy censorship of the arts.

Hippler later claimed the decision led to his removal from office, however Goebbels claimed in his own diary that “mishaps, alcoholism, and family problems” were in fact the cause for his dismissal. Kästner himself wrote under the pseudonym Berthold Bürger, a play on two names; a creator of the Münchhausen legend, Gottfried Bürger, and Bertolt Brecht, a peer of Kästner who was exiled in 1933 by the Third Reich. The final script was drawn from the original text published in 1785 as well as two other versions: Karl Leberecht Immermann’s 1839 version and Carl Haensel’s 1920 version.

== Production ==
The film’s production began in 1942 with an initial budget of over 4.5 million Reichsmarks (ℛℳ) that increased to over 6.5 million ℛℳ, after Goebbels’ intentions to “surpass the special effects and color artistry” of Alexander Korda's Technicolor film The Thief of Bagdad. Josef von Báky looked to this film as well as Hollywood's productions of Snow White and the Seven Dwarfs and Gone with the Wind for visual inspiration. Emil Hasler and Otto Gülstorff designed the set, and Konstantin Irmen-Tschet was placed in charge of editing and staging the film, including the special effects.

The budget for the film allowed von Báky and his production staff nearly limitless opportunities to display the superlative nature of Kästner's vision of Baron von Münchhausen. The dinner scene that is set in the Russian palace featured real gold and silver tableware as well as Meissen porcelain on loan from museums, and was protected by SS guards dressed in costume while the scene was shot. The sequence of scenes in Venice was shot on location, with Irmen-Tschet gaining private access to the Grand Canal for an entire day, as noted by Eberhard von Weise who worked on the film's production. Additionally von Weise wrote on the movement of entire sets across the border in railcars with “precious carnival costumes” amid numerous other set pieces that were brought along and used by local Venetians as extras in the film.

== Reception ==
Adolf Hitler and Goebbels had a well-documented disagreement over how propaganda for the Third Reich should be produced, with Goebbels favouring the Volksfilm style. He referred to Münchhausen as a “popular film in the truest sense of the term.”

The film was released at a pivotal point in Nazi rule following the massive losses of the 6th Army at the Battle of Stalingrad and was an attempt at reinvigorating the German population. The film provided visual relief from the war and, as one of the few fantastical films produced by the Ministry of Propaganda, represented a rare opportunity for escapism. After viewing parts of the film, Hitler instructed Goebbels to ensure that, “Kästner should have no further assignments.”

When the film was first released it had a run time of 133 minutes, however a second re-censored version was released three months later with a run time of 118 minutes, indicating the decision to remove the most controversial aspects of the film by the Ministry of Propaganda. Today a 114-minute version exists in the Murnau Foundation. Contemporary journalists and critics pointed to many aspects of the film, most notably the role of gender and sexuality and the fantastical themes as evidence that the film was intended as a counterpoint to Nazi rule.

Hippler denied these claims asserting that in “total war”, as outlined in Goebbels’ 1943 Sportspalast speech, “national life becomes weapons” and strengthening the morale of a country was key to the success of the German campaign. Both during and after World War II, the film saw massive commercial and critical success and not only recouped the sizable government investment, but also earned modern praise as being “the greatest German color film of all time” by film historian Eric Rentschler.

== Cast ==
Actor	Role
Hans Albers	Baron Münchhausen
Ilse Werner	Princess Isabella d'Este
Wilhelm Bendow	The Moon Man
Brigitte Horney	Tsarin Catherine II
Michael Bohnen	Duke Karl von Braunschweig
Ferdinand Marian	Count Cagliostro
Hans Brausewetter	Baron von Hartenfeld
Hermann Speelmans	Christian Kuchenreutter
Marina von Ditmar	Sophie von Riedesel
Andrews Engelmann	Prince Potemkin
Käthe Haack	Baroness Münchhausen
Waldemar Leitgeb	Prince Grigorij Orlow
Walter Lieck	Runner
Hubert von Meyerinck	Prince Anton Ulrich
Jaspar von Oertzen	Count Lanskoi
Werner Scharf	Prince Francesco d'Este
Armin Schweizer	Johann
Leo Slezak	Sultan Abd ul Hamid
Hilde von Stolz	Louise La Tour
Louis Brody	Servant (uncredited)
Theodor Wonja Michael	Servant (uncredited)

== Availability ==
A 110-minute version of this film was released on DVD (NTSC, Region 1) by Kino Video on 20 July 2004. The same version was released on PAL (Region 2) DVD by the British Eureka Video in July 2005. The 132 minute premiere version and the 117 minute restored version were released on Blu ray disc in Germany and the 117 minute restored version was released on Blu ray disc in the United States.

== See also ==
- The Adventures of Baron Munchausen (1988), by Terry Gilliam
- The Fabulous Baron Munchausen (1962), by Karel Zeman
- Les Aventures de baron de Munchhausen (1911) by Georges Méliès
