= The Woman at the Crossroads (1938 film) =

- Directed by: Josef von Báky
- Written by: Alice Lyttkens (novel); Thea von Harbou
- Starring: Ewald Balser; Magda Schneider; Karin Hardt; Hans Söhnker
- Cinematography: István Eiben
- Edited by: Wolfgang Becker
- Music by: Viktor Vaszy
- Production companies: Pictura-Film; Hunnia Filmstúdió
- Distributed by: Terra Film
- Release date: 26 August 1938
- Running time: 95 minutes
- Country: Germany
- Language: German

The Woman at the Crossroads (German: Die Frau am Scheidewege) is a 1938 German drama film directed by Josef von Báky and starring Ewald Balser, Magda Schneider and Karin Hardt. It was made partly at the Hunnia Film Studios in Budapest. The film's sets were designed by the art director Emil Hasler.

== Synopsis ==
After a failed marriage to an artist, a young female doctor returns to her rightful place in the hospital.

== Cast ==
- Ewald Balser as Prof. Henrici
- Magda Schneider as Dr.med. Hanna Weigand
- Karin Hardt as Elinor Weigand
- Hans Söhnker as Fred Moebius
- Ilse Furstenberg as Frau Pawlowski
- Paul Westermeier as Johann
- Georg Alexander as Herrenguth
- Willi Schur as Pawlowski - Arbeiter
- Ernst Waldow as Von Dieter
- Margarete Schön as Oberschwester Hermine
- Peter Elsholtz as Brandes
- Gustav Püttjer as Schaffner
- Eduard Wenck as Patient
- Hilde Maroff as Patientin
- Vera Hartegg as Empfangsschwester
- Peter Bosse as Pawlowskis Sohn
- Lidia Beöthy as Nachtschwester
- Rudolf Schündler as Graup

== Bibliography ==
- Hake, Sabine. Popular Cinema of the Third Reich. University of Texas Press, 2001.
