= Walter Ladengast =

Austrian actor

- Born: 4 July 1899; Vienna, Austria-Hungary
- Died: 3 July 1980 (aged 80); Munich, West Germany
- Occupation: Actor
- Years active: 1928-1979

Walter Ladengast (4 July 1899 – 3 July 1980) was an Austrian film actor. He appeared in more than 70 films between 1928 and 1979, a majority silent. His film career momentarily suffered when it was discovered he was a Nazi Sympathizer.

After the war, his film career picked up but he was given only supporting roles.

He was born in Vienna, Austria and died in Munich, Germany, aged 80.

== Filmography ==
Year	Title	Role	Notes
1928	Under the Lantern		
1934	Music in the Blood	Franz Zahlinger, Korrepetitor	
1934	Love, Death and the Devil		
1935	The Foolish Virgin	Erich Büchner, Künstler	
1935	Anschlag auf Schweda	Hans Kessler	
1936	Under Blazing Heavens	Pferdepfleger	
1938	Die Umwege des schönen Karl		
1939	Spaßvögel	Krull	
1939	Detours to Happiness	Komponist	
1939	Her First Experience	Gohlke	
1939	My Aunt, Your Aunt	Rudolf Trautmann	
1940	The Fire Devil	Rafael Kröss, Verräter	
1940	The Girl at the Reception		
1940	Das leichte Mädchen	Anselmus	
1940	Wunschkonzert	Schwarzkopf	
1941	Alles für Gloria		
1941	Illusion	Feldgruber	
1943	The War of the Oxen	Ludwig von Ingolstadt	
1947	Die Welt dreht sich verkehrt		
1947	Triumph der Liebe	Manes	
1948	Hin und her	Kanal-Otto	
1949	Märchen vom Glück	Ferraris	
1949	White Gold	Schneider-Sepp	
1950	Alles für die Firma		
1950	The Lie		
1950	Theodore the Goalkeeper	Kino-Billeteur	
1950	A Day Will Come	Narrator	Uncredited
1950	Two Times Lotte	Herr Gabele	
1951	Call Over the Air	Der Geflickte	
1951	Falschmünzer am Werk		
1951	Gateway to Peace	Thomas	
1951	Decision Before Dawn	German Deserter	Uncredited
1952	Roses Bloom on the Moorland	Fromann	
1953	The Village Under the Sky	Schmuggler Kaspar	
1953	The Immortal Vagabond		
1954	Operation Edelweiss	Ignatz	
1955	Hanussen		
1955	Das Mädchen vom Pfarrhof	Sepp	
1956	Two Bavarians in St. Pauli	Zookeeper	
1957	Wetterleuchten um Maria	Heimerer Sepp	
1958	Taiga	Bachmann	
1959	Jacqueline	Nöll, Dramaturg	
1959	Heimat, deine Lieder	Hannes' Vater	
1960	The Haunted Castle	Gerichtsgutachter	Uncredited
1960	Sacred Waters	Kaplan Johannes	
1961	The Dead Eyes of London	Pförtner	Uncredited
1968	Till the Happy End	Großvater	
1970	A Big Grey-Blue Bird	Belotti	
1970	The Age of the Fish	Cäsar	
1971	I Love You, I Kill You		
1974	The Enigma of Kaspar Hauser	Professor Georg Friedrich Daumer	
1975	Berlinger		
1979	Nosferatu the Vampyre	Dr. Abraham Van Helsing	
