= The Ways of Love Are Strange (1937 film) =

1937 film

- Directed by: Hans H. Zerlett
- Written by: Hans H. Zerlett
- Produced by: Erich Palme
- Starring: Karl Ludwig Diehl; Olga Tschechowa; Karin Hardt
- Cinematography: Georg Krause
- Edited by: Ella Ensink
- Music by: Leo Leux
- Production company: Euphono-Film
- Distributed by: UFA
- Release date: 10 March 1937
- Running time: 80 minutes
- Country: Germany
- Language: German

The Ways of Love Are Strange (German: Liebe geht seltsame Wege) is a 1937 German drama film directed by Hans H. Zerlett and starring Karl Ludwig Diehl, Olga Tschechowa and Karin Hardt. It was shot at the Babelsberg Studios in Berlin. The film's sets were designed by the art directors Karl Machus and Otto Moldenhauer.

== Cast ==
- Karl Ludwig Diehl as Hauptmann Costali/Haushofmeister Archibald
- Olga Tschechowa as Antonia Delvarez
- Karin Hardt as Delia Vigo - ihre Nichte
- Edwin Jürgensen as Polizeipräfekt Montefranca
- Werner Schott as Der General
- Arthur Schröder as Carlos Vigo - Maler
- Olga Limburg as Die Herzogin
- Robert Dorsay as Pedro - Montefrancas Chauffeur
- Hermann Pfeiffer as Der Oberkommissar
- Josef Eichheim as Luciano - Diener bei Antonia
- Hilde Sessak as Bianca - Zofe bei Antonia
- Lotte Rausch as Carola - Köchin bei Antonia
- Erwin Biegel as Laforga - Tabakhändler
- Gerhard Dammann as Polizeimajor
- Hans Proft as Polizeileutnant
- Margit Symo as Tanzpaar
- Michael Symo as Tanzpaar

== Bibliography ==
- Bock, Hans-Michael & Bergfelder, Tim. The Concise CineGraph. Encyclopedia of German Cinema. Berghahn Books, 2009.
- Romani, Cinzia. Tainted Goddesses : Female Film Stars of the Third Reich. Da Capo Press, 1992.
- Waldman, Harry. Nazi Films in America, 1933-1942. McFarland, 2008.
