= Karin Hardt =

German actress

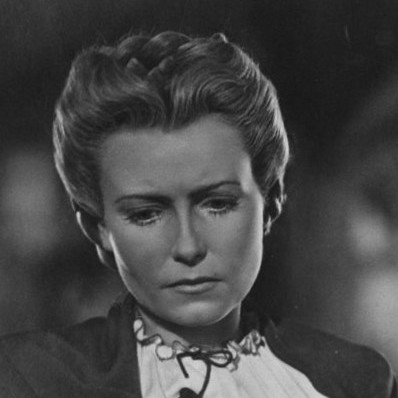
- Hardt in Via Mala (1945)
- Born: 28 April 1910; Altona, Hamburg, Germany
- Died: 5 March 1992 (aged 81); Berlin, Germany
- Occupation: Actress
- Spouses: Erich Waschneck; Rolf von Goth

Karin Hardt Meta Therese (28 April 1910 in Altona, Hamburg – 5 March 1992 in Berlin) was a German actress.

== Early life and education ==
A merchant's daughter, Hardt first took private acting lessons with Alex Otto.

== Career ==
She received theatrical engagements in Mönchengladbach, Rheydt, and Altenburg. In 1931, she made with Vater geht auf Reisen her film debut and was promoted in the coming years, quickly becoming a popular star. Among her best known films of the 1930s include Ein gewisser Herr Gran (1933), Barcarole (1935), The Roundabouts of Handsome Karl (1938) and Menschen vom Varieté (1939), where she was the naive blonde rival of La Jana. During the war years, the film roles became less frequent. She acted, among other things in Comrades (1941) and Via Mala (1945).

After the war, only a few more film appearances followed such as the Queen in Fritz Genschow's fairytale Sleeping Beauty (1955), in addition to Horst Buchholz in Endstation Liebe (1957) and alongside Kirk Douglas in Town Without Pity (1961). Instead, she played mostly on the stage again, in cities including Berlin, Hamburg, Aachen and Cologne. From the 1960s, she increasingly received proposals from television. After appearances on TV shows like Bei uns zu Haus (1963), Der Forellenhof (1965), Die Unternehmungen des Herrn Hans (1976) and as a grandmother in Ein Jahr ohne Sonntag, and movies like Just a Gigolo (1979, directed by David Hemmings), she played from 1985 to 1986 the housekeeper Kati in the successful TV-series The Black Forest Clinic and in 1988 the mother of Robert Liebling in the ARD series Liebling Kreuzberg. In 1991 she stood for Mrs. Harris und der Heiratsschwindler on the side of Inge Meysel one last time before the camera. She also starred in the television series Die Wicherts von nebenan as the Countess of Strelenau.

== Awards ==
In 1983, she received an award for outstanding work in many years of German film.

== Personal life ==
In 1933, Hardt was married to director Erich Waschneck. Her second, later divorced, marriage was to Rolf von Goth.

Karin Hardt died 5 March 1992. Her tomb is located in the cemetery in Wilmersdorf, anonymous burial.

== Partial filmography ==
- Vater geht auf Reisen (1932) - Eva Müller
- Eight Girls in a Boat (1932) - Christa
- Sacred Waters (1932) - Sabine Waldisch
- Die blonde Christl (1933) - Christine Schröder
- Hände aus dem Dunkel (1933) - Cilly Kastor, Stenotypistin
- A Certain Mr. Gran (1933) - Viola Dolleen
- Abel mit der Mundharmonika (1933) - Corinna
- Schön ist es, verliebt zu sein (1934) - Else, Blumenverkäuferin
- Jede Frau hat ein Geheimnis (1934) - Annemie Kolpe
- Between Heaven and Earth (1934) - Christine
- Love and the First Railway (1934) - Brigitte, beider Tochter
- Hermine and the Seven Upright Men (1935) - Hermine, seine Tochter
- The Foolish Virgin (1935) - Irmgard, ihre Tochter
- Barcarola (1935)
- If It Were Not for Music (1935) - Thekla, seine Tochter
- Love's Awakening (1936) - Hanni - seine Tochter
- A Doctor of Conviction (1936) - Elisabeth
- The Adventurer of Paris (1936) - Mabel
- Port Arthur (1936) - Youki, Boris's wife
- The Ways of Love Are Strange (1937) - Delia Vigo - ihre Nichte
- Daphne and the Diplomat (1937) - Daphne
- The Roundabouts of Handsome Karl (1938) - Grete Wernicke - Tochter
- The Man Who Couldn't Say No (1938) - Gasperina
- Heiraten - aber wen? (1938) - Ursula Werndorff
- The Woman at the Crossroads (1938) - Elinor Weigand
- Stärker als die Liebe (1938)
- Peter spielt mit dem Feuer (1938) - Charlotte, seine Frau
- Stars of Variety (1939) - Gloria Mc'Lean
- Fasching (1939) - Lisa Petersen
- Dein Leben gehört mir (1939)
- Sommer, Sonne, Erika (1939) - Erika
- Männerwirtschaft (1941) - Ilske Röhling
- Familienanschluß (1941) - Käthe Barkhahn
- Comrades (1941) - Christine von Krusemarck
- His Son (1942) - Brigitte, Frau Hellmers Nichte
- Liebe, Leidenschaft und Leid (1943) - Therese
- Schicksal am Strom (1944) - Marianne, seine Tochter
- The Wedding Hotel (1944) - Brigitte Elling, Verkäuferin
- A Man Like Maximilian (1945) - Monika, dessen Frau
- Via Mala (1945) - Silvelie
- Thank You, I'm Fine (1948) - Martina Holk
- Madonna in Chains (1949) - Gerda Wienholt
- Der Dorfmonarch (1950) - Christine
- Vier Treppen rechts (1950) - Marianne Müller
- Island of the Dead (1955) - Erna Kahlmayer
- Lost Child 312 (1955) - Aufseherin im Kinderheim
- Sleeping Beauty (1955) - Königin
- Endstation Liebe (1958) - Frau Lehnhoff
- Town Without Pity (1961) - Frau Steinhof
- Einer fehlt beim Kurkonzert (1968, TV Movie) - Hilde Brocksieben
- Just a Gigolo (1978) - Frau Uexkull
- The Black Forest Clinic (1985–1987, TV Series) - Käti
- Liebling Kreuzberg (1988, TV Series) - Mama Elfriede Liebling
