= Ewald von Demandowsky =

German film producer (1906–1946)

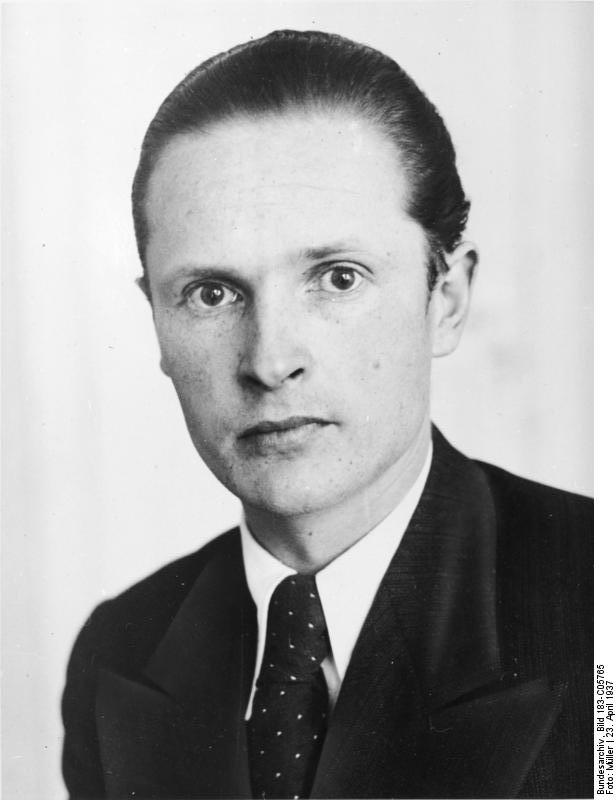
Ewald von Demandowsky, 1937

Ewald von Demandowsky (21 October 1906 – 7 October 1946) was a German film producer who held the office of a Nazi German Reichsfilmdramaturg and was head of production at the Tobis Film company in the Third Reich.

== Career ==
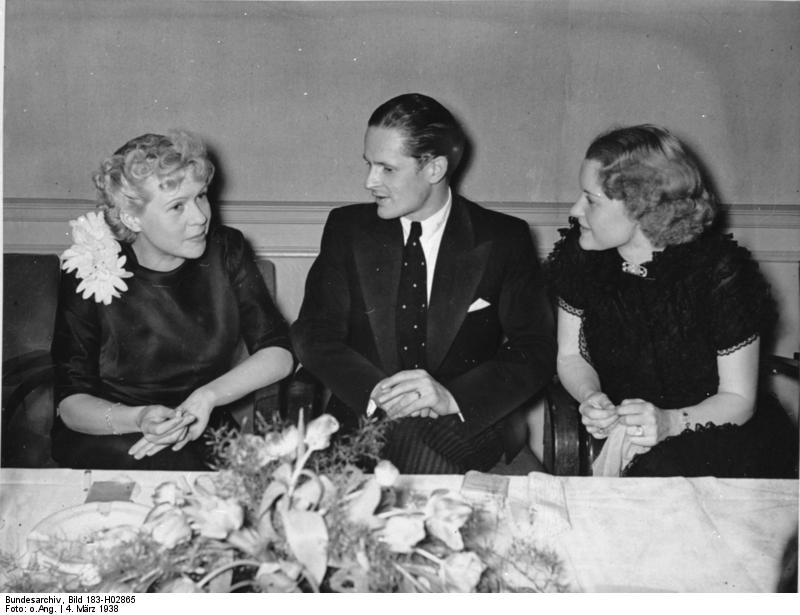
Pictured at a Reichsfilmkammer dinner with actresses Fita Benkhoff and Hilde Krüger, 1938

Demandowsky was born in Berlin. Already a member of the Nazi Party in 1930, he gained employment as a cultural-political editor of the Völkischer Beobachter newspaper. In 1937 he was appointed Reichsfilmdramaturg subordinate to the Ministry of Public Enlightenment and Propaganda and served to abort unwanted filming projects at the behest of Reich Minister Joseph Goebbels. Two years later he became head of Tobis Filmkunst, then the second largest German film production company after Universum Film AG. He produced a number of notorious Nazi propaganda films, including Ohm Krüger and Ich klage an. Demandowsky had a love affair with rising star Hildegard Knef in the latter part of World War II.

According to Knef, Demandowsky was assigned to the Volkssturm militia at the end of the war, fled from Berlin, surrendered and was transferred to a prisoner of war camp by the Polish Armed Forces but soon after was released to return to Berlin. In 1946, he was re-arrested by US military police and handed over to the Soviet Military Administration. Demandowsky was sentenced to death by a Soviet Military Tribunal on charges of fascist war propaganda and shot on 7 October 1946 in Berlin-Lichtenberg.

== Rehabilitation ==
In 1991 Demandowsky was rehabilitated by the public prosecutor of the Russian Federation (main military prosecutor) in accordance with article 3 letter a of the Act of the Russian Federation on the rehabilitation of victims of political reprisals of 18 October 1991.
