= Adventure on the Southern Express =

1934 film

- Directed by: Erich Waschneck
- Written by: Ernst Marischka
- Produced by: Robert Neppach
- Starring: Charlotte Susa; Karl Ludwig Diehl; Ralph Arthur Roberts
- Cinematography: Carl Drews
- Edited by: Friedel Buckow
- Music by: Robert Stolz
- Production company: RN Filmproduktion
- Distributed by: Europa Filmverleih; Atlantis-Film (Austria)
- Release date: 14 March 1934
- Running time: 81 minutes
- Country: Germany
- Language: German

Adventure on the Southern Express (German: Abenteuer im Südexpress) is a 1934 German thriller film directed by Erich Waschneck and starring Charlotte Susa, Karl Ludwig Diehl and Ralph Arthur Roberts. It was shot at the Johannisthal Studios in Berlin and on location in Northern Italy and Switzerland. The film's sets were designed by the art director Otto Guelstorff.

== Synopsis ==
While a train is travelling through the Italian Alps, the jewellery of a wealthy young widow is stolen. An ex-soldier working as a waiter on the train comes under suspicion of the crime.

== Cast ==
- Charlotte Susa as Lisa von Hellwitz, eine junge Witwe
- Karl Ludwig Diehl as Hans Lenzfeld, Speisewagenkellner
- Ralph Arthur Roberts as Prinz Tarnoff
- Richard Romanowsky as Prof. Eberhard Degenfeld, Privatgelehrter
- Charly Berger
- Elli Blank
- Walter Dysing
- Angelo Ferrari
- Baby Gray as Singer
- Lotte Haas
- Trude Haefelin
- Paul Heidemann as Schnäbeli, Privatdetektiv
- Carola Höhn
- Fred Immler
- Walter Krilla
- Otto Kronburger as Diener des Prinzen
- Maria Loja
- Hans Richter as Max, Pikkolo im Speisewagen
- Annemarie Schwindt
- Hans Stiebner
- Michael von Newlinsky
- Wolfgang von Schwindt

== Bibliography ==
- Caneppele, Paolo (2002). Entscheidungen der Tiroler Filmzensur: 1922–1938. Vienna: Film Archiv Austria. ISBN 978-3-901932-12-0.
