= The Man Who Couldn't Say No (1938 film) =

1938 film

- Directed by: Mario Camerini
- Written by: Mario Camerini; Werner Finck; Karl Lerbs
- Based on: Ma non è una cosa seria (play) by Luigi Pirandello
- Produced by: Alberto Giacalone
- Starring: Karl Ludwig Diehl; Karin Hardt; Leo Slezak
- Cinematography: Werner Bohne
- Edited by: René Métain
- Music by: Walter Kollo; Alfred Strasser
- Production company: Itala Film
- Distributed by: Siegel-Monopolfilm
- Release date: 1 February 1938
- Running time: 88 minutes
- Country: Germany
- Language: German

The Man Who Couldn't Say No (German: Der Mann, der nicht nein sagen kann) is a 1938 German romantic comedy film directed by Mario Camerini and starring Karl Ludwig Diehl, Karin Hardt, and Leo Slezak. It is a remake of the 1936 Italian film But It's Nothing Serious also directed by Camerini. It was shot at the Halensee Studios in Berlin. The film's sets were designed by the art directors Gabriel Pellon and Heinrich Richter.

== Plot ==
German version of the Italian film Ma Non È Una Cosa Seria, from a Pirandello story: a man inoculates himself against emotional entanglement by deliberately marrying a woman he has no interest in and with whom he will spend no time.

== Cast ==
- Karl Ludwig Diehl as Memmo Speranza
- Karin Hardt as Gasperina
- Leo Slezak as Barranco
- Werner Finck as Lamanna
- Frauke Lauterbach as Elsa
- Hilde Krüger as Marguerite
- Charlott Daudert as Loletta
- Georgia Lind as Mathilde
- Erik von Loewis as Giulio, Elsas Bruder
- Olga Engl as Theresa, Elsas Mutter
- Hans Stock as Andreas, Elsas Vater
- Erwin Biegel as Giovanni, Diener Memmos
- Else Valery as Luisa, Haushälterin
- Eduard von Winterstein as Colonel, Mathildes Vater
- Hans Hermann Schaufuß as Grizoffi, Pensionsgast
- Hermann Pfeiffer as Virgadamo, Pensiongast
- Margarete Sachse as Lehrerin, Pensiongast
- Irene Margot as Sängerin
- Josef Reithofer as Arzt

== Bibliography ==
- Nichols, Nina daVinci; Bazzoni, Jana O'Keefe (1995). Pirandello and Film. Lincoln: University of Nebraska Press. ISBN 978-0-8032-3336-2.
- Klaus, Ulrich J. Deutsche Tonfilme: Jahrgang 1938. Klaus-Archiv, 1988.
