= Love and the First Railway =

1934 film directed by Hasso Preiss

- Directed by: Hasso Preiss
- Written by: Axel Delmar (play); Curt J. Braun
- Produced by: Robert Neppach
- Starring: Jakob Tiedtke; Ida Wüst; Karin Hardt
- Cinematography: Carl Drews
- Music by: Harald Böhmelt
- Production company: R.N.-Filmproduktion
- Distributed by: UFA
- Release date: 27 November 1934
- Country: Germany
- Language: German

Love and the First Railway (German: Die Liebe und die erste Eisenbahn) is a 1934 German historical comedy film directed by Hasso Preiss, produced by Robert Neppach and starring Jakob Tiedtke, Ida Wüst, and Karin Hardt. The plot revolves around the construction of the railway line between Berlin and Potsdam in the 1830s, the first in the Kingdom of Prussia.

The film's sets were designed by the art director Otto Guelstorff.

== Main cast ==
- Jakob Tiedtke as F.W. Eichmann, Posthalter in Zehlendorf
- Ida Wüst as Helene, seine Frau
- Karin Hardt as Brigitte, beider Tochter
- Hans Schlenck as Ferdinand Miller, Dampfwagen-Ingenieur
- Fritz Kampers as Paul Kluthammer, sein Faktotum
- Genia Nikolaieva as Nanette, Luftakrobatin
- Max Gülstorff as B.C. Fechner, Bankier in Berlin
- Paul Westermeier as Eckensteher Nante
- Hans Zesch-Ballot as Schelling, Agent bei Bankier Fechner
- Ernst Behmer as Der Potsdamer Landbriefträger

== Bibliography ==
- Bock, Hans-Michael; Bergfelder, Tim, eds. (2009). The Concise Cinegraph: Encyclopaedia of German Cinema. New York: Berghahn Books. ISBN 978-1-57181-655-9.
- Waldman, Harry (2008). Nazi Films in America, 1933–1942. Jefferson, NC: McFarland. ISBN 978-0-7864-3861-7.
