= Small Town Poet =

1940 film

- Directed by: Josef von Báky
- Written by: H.W. Becker; Utz Utermann
- Based on: Verkannte Bekannte by Utz Utermann
- Produced by: Eberhard Schmidt
- Starring: Paul Kemp; Hilde Schneider; Edith Oß; Georg Alexander
- Cinematography: Franz Weihmayr
- Edited by: Anna Höllering
- Music by: Georg Haentzschel; Friedrich Schröder
- Production company: UFA
- Distributed by: UFA
- Release date: 20 December 1940
- Running time: 96 minutes
- Country: Germany
- Language: German

Small Town Poet (German: Der Kleinstadtpoet) is a 1940 German comedy film directed by Josef von Báky and starring Paul Kemp, Hilde Schneider, Edith Oß and Georg Alexander. It was shot at the Babelsberg Studios in Potsdam. The film's sets were designed by the art directors Franz F. Fürst and Willy Schiller.

== Synopsis ==
Schleemüller is the town clerk in a small settlement who dreams of one day becoming mayor. He also writes poetry secretly as he doesn't believe it fitting for a man in his position. One day he drunkenly confesses to the hairdresser Emily and persuades him to publish the poems in his own name. The works rapidly become a bestseller and Emil's business thrives as he is now public celebrity. However when one of the next batch of poems casts the town in an unflattering light and Emil suddenly finds his hairdressing salon boycotted by everyone. Schleemüller wonders up if he should own about his authorship, particularly as a university is about to make a grant of 10,000 marks.

== Cast ==
- Paul Kemp as Paul Schleemüller, Stadtsekretär
- Hilde Schneider as Lotte Ziemke
- Edith Oß as Lisette Siebenlist
- Wilfried Seyferth as Emil Kurz, Friseur
- Georg Alexander as Assessor von Bornefeld, Pauls Vorgesetzter
- Hilde Hildebrand as Lona Elvira
- Hans Brausewetter as Lerche, Redakteur des Schönbacher Tagblatts
- Hans Leibelt as Von Lindau, Landrat
- Karl Etlinger as Sanitätsrat
- Georg Thomalla as Siegfried, Angestellter bei Emil
- Heinz Ohlsen as Lehrjunge
- Ludwig Linkmann as Friedrich Klemke
- Hans Junkermann as Geheimrat Parisius
- Erwin Biegel as Lehrer
- Karl Iban as Gustav, Bürohilfe beim Staatssekretär
- Claude Farell as Zenzi
- Maria Loja as Frau Siebenlist
- Charlotte Harbecker as Frau Stubenrauch
- Hans Meyer-Hanno as Wachtmeister
- Friedrich Honna as Sattlermeister
- Walter Doerry as Pedell
- Egon Brosig as Stadthonoratior am Stammtisch
- Gerhard Dammann as Der Wirt und Stadthonoratior am Stammtisch
- Aribert Grimmer as Schmied von Schönbach
- Walter Lieck as Installateur
- Hermann Mayer-Falkow as Der Chauffeur Lona Elviras
- Hadrian Maria Netto as Stadthonoratior am Stammtisch
- Angelo Ferrari as Ein Doktor der Universität
- Ewald Wenck as Postbote
- Klaus Pohl as Vorstand der Friseurinnung von Schönbach
- Franz Weber as Bürgermeister
- Gustav Püttjer as Ein Doktor der Universität

== Bibliography ==
- Elsaesser, Thomas & Wedel, Michael . The BFI companion to German cinema. British Film Institute, 1999.
- Klaus, Ulrich J. Deutsche Tonfilme: Jahrgang 1940. Klaus-Archiv, 1988.
- Taylor, Richard (ed.) The BFI companion to Eastern European and Russian cinema. British Film Institute, 2000.
