= Edith Oß =

- Born: 10 May 1914; Chemnitz, German Empire
- Died: 3 March 2012 (aged 97); Munich, Germany
- Occupations: Actress; Dancer
- Years active: 1935-1952 (film)

Edith Oß (1914–2012) was a German dancer and film actress.

== Selected filmography ==
- The Private Life of Louis XIV (1935)
- All Because of the Dog (1935)
- Punks Arrives from America (1935)
- Men, Animals and Sensations (1938)
- We Danced Around the World (1939)
- The Golden Mask (1939)
- Stars of Variety (1939)
- The Girl at the Reception (1940)
- Small Town Poet (1940)
- Women Are Better Diplomats (1941)
- Clarissa (1941)
- We Make Music (1942)
- The Night in Venice (1942)
- A Flea in Her Ear (1943)
- The Time with You (1948)
- Once on the Rhine (1952)

== Bibliography ==
- Lentz III, Harris M. Obituaries in the Performing Arts, 2012. McFarland, 2013.
