= A Flea in Her Ear (1943 film) =

1943 film directed by Paul Heidemann

- Directed by: Paul Heidemann
- Written by: Edgar Kahn; Wolf Neumeister
- Based on: A Flea in Her Ear by Friedrich Hedler
- Produced by: Robert Wüllner
- Starring: Lotte Rausch; Sabine Peters; Edith Oß
- Cinematography: Eduard Hoesch; Walter Roßkopf
- Edited by: Bruno Jankowski
- Music by: Harald Böhmelt
- Production company: Tobis Film
- Distributed by: Deutsche Filmvertriebs
- Release date: 2 March 1943
- Running time: 73 minutes
- Country: Germany
- Language: German

A Flea in Her Ear (German: Floh im Ohr) is a 1943 German comedy film directed by Paul Heidemann and starring Lotte Rausch, Sabine Peters and Edith Oß. It was shot at the Johannisthal Studios in Berlin. The film's sets were designed by the art director Artur Nortmann and Gabriel Pellon. Rather than being based on the 1907 farce A Flea in Her Ear by Georges Feydeau, it is instead adapted from a play by Friedrich Hedler.

== Cast ==
- Emil Heß as Großvater Christian Lohhof
- Lotte Rausch as Tante Johanna Lohhof
- Sabine Peters as Hanna Lohhof
- Edith Oß as Antje Lohhof
- Fritz Genschow as Großknecht Karl Lührmann
- Rudolf Blümner as Knecht Claas
- Carla Werner as Erna, Magd
- Hansi Wendler as Mining
- Claus Holm as Knecht Hannes
- Günther Lüders as Postangestellter Friesecke
- Harald Paulsen as Tierarzt Dr. Heinicke
- Alfred Maack as Bügermeister Ahlbeer
- Franz Weber as Bauer Püttmann
- Gunnar Möller as Jungknecht Willi
- Wilhelm Bendow as Gemeindeschreiber Martin
- Hans Mierendorff as Gastwirt Gustav
- Erna Sellmer as Hebamme Frau Buschmann
- Lieselott Klingler as Kellnerin Elsbeth
- Josefine Dora as Alte Bäuerin

== Bibliography ==
- Bock, Hans-Michael. Die Tobis 1928-1945: eine kommentierte Filmografie. Edition Text + Kritik, 2003.
- Klaus, Ulrich J. Deutsche Tonfilme: Jahrgang 1942. Klaus-Archiv, 1988.
