= Weiss Ferdl =

German actor (1883–1949)

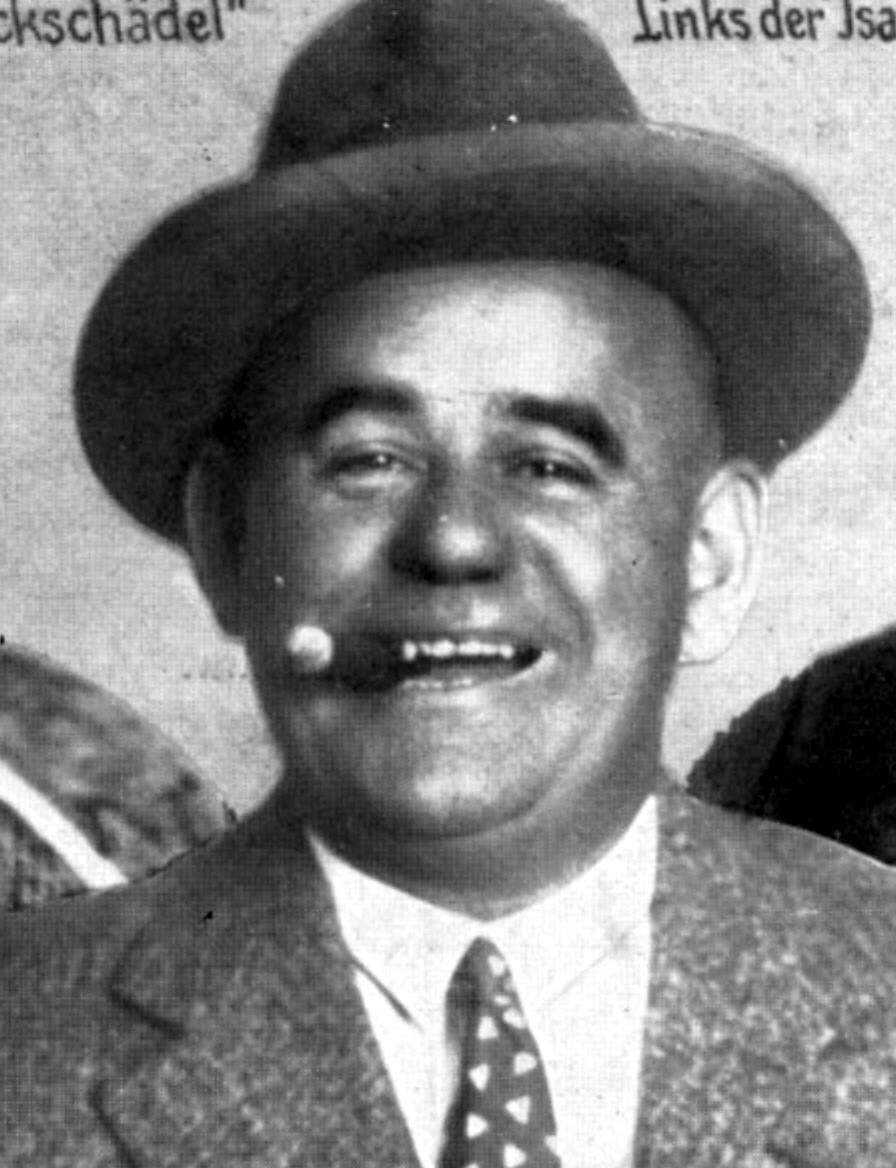
- Weiß Ferdl in 1924
- Born: 28 June 1883; Altötting, German Empire
- Died: 19 June 1949 (aged 65); Munich, West Germany
- Occupation: Actor
- Years active: 1928-1941

Weiss Ferdl (28 June 1883 – 19 June 1949, real name: Ferdinand Weisheitinger) was a German actor, humorous folksinger, and author. He appeared in 19 films between 1928 and 1941 and performed regularly at the Platzl, a well-known Munich theater. Weiß Ferdl was born in the town of Altötting, 96 km (60 mi) east of Munich.

His famous song "Ein Wagen von der Linie Acht" ("A Carriage from Line 8") is still played to this day. It is a mocking song about Munich people and the trams in Munich. The Weiß-Ferdl-Mittelschule, a secondary school in Altötting, has a retired blue Munich Tram carriage in the southeast corner of the schoolyard.

== Selected filmography ==
- Behind Monastery Walls (1928)
- Left of the Isar, Right of the Spree (1929)
- The Immortal Vagabond (1930)
- The Song of the Nations (1931)
- The Champion Shot (1932)
- The Master Detective (1933)
- The Two Seals (1934)
- Financial Opportunists (1934)
- All Because of the Dog (1935)
- Orders Are Orders (1936)
- Gordian the Tyrant (1937)
- Wunschkonzert (1940)

== Selected discography ==
- CD Weiß Ferdl, I woaß net wia ma is, Aufnahmen 1919–1946, Ed. Christian Springer, Trikont 2001

== Selected bibliography ==
- Ich bin kein Intellektueller. Ein heiteres Buch. Hugendubel, München 1941.
- Bayerische Schmankerl. Hrsg.: Bertl Weiss. dtv, München 1982, ISBN 3-423-01752-X.
