= Maria Loja =

German actress

- Born: 12 February 1890; Hamburg, German Empire
- Died: 3 January 1953 (aged 62); West Berlin, West Germany
- Occupation: Actor
- Years active: 1934-1953 (film)

Maria Loja (1890–1953) was a German stage and film actress.

== Selected filmography ==
- What Am I Without You (1934)
- Adventure on the Southern Express (1934)
- The Grand Duke's Finances (1934)
- What Am I Without You (1934)
- Make Me Happy (1935)
- I Was Jack Mortimer (1935)
- Augustus the Strong (1936)
- Don't Promise Me Anything (1937)
- Men Without a Fatherland (1937)
- The Grey Lady (1937)
- Secret Mission (1938)
- The Life and Loves of Tschaikovsky (1939)
- Men Are That Way (1939)
- Her First Experience (1939)
- Small Town Poet (1940)
- The Waitress Anna (1941)
- A Salzburg Comedy (1943)
- Romance in a Minor Key (1943)
- The Buchholz Family (1944)
- Journey to Happiness (1948)
- The Sonnenbrucks (1951)
- The Spendthrift (1953)

== Bibliography ==
- Giesen, Rolf. Nazi Propaganda Films: A History and Filmography. McFarland, 2003.
