= Theodor Wonja Michael =

German journalist (1925–2019)

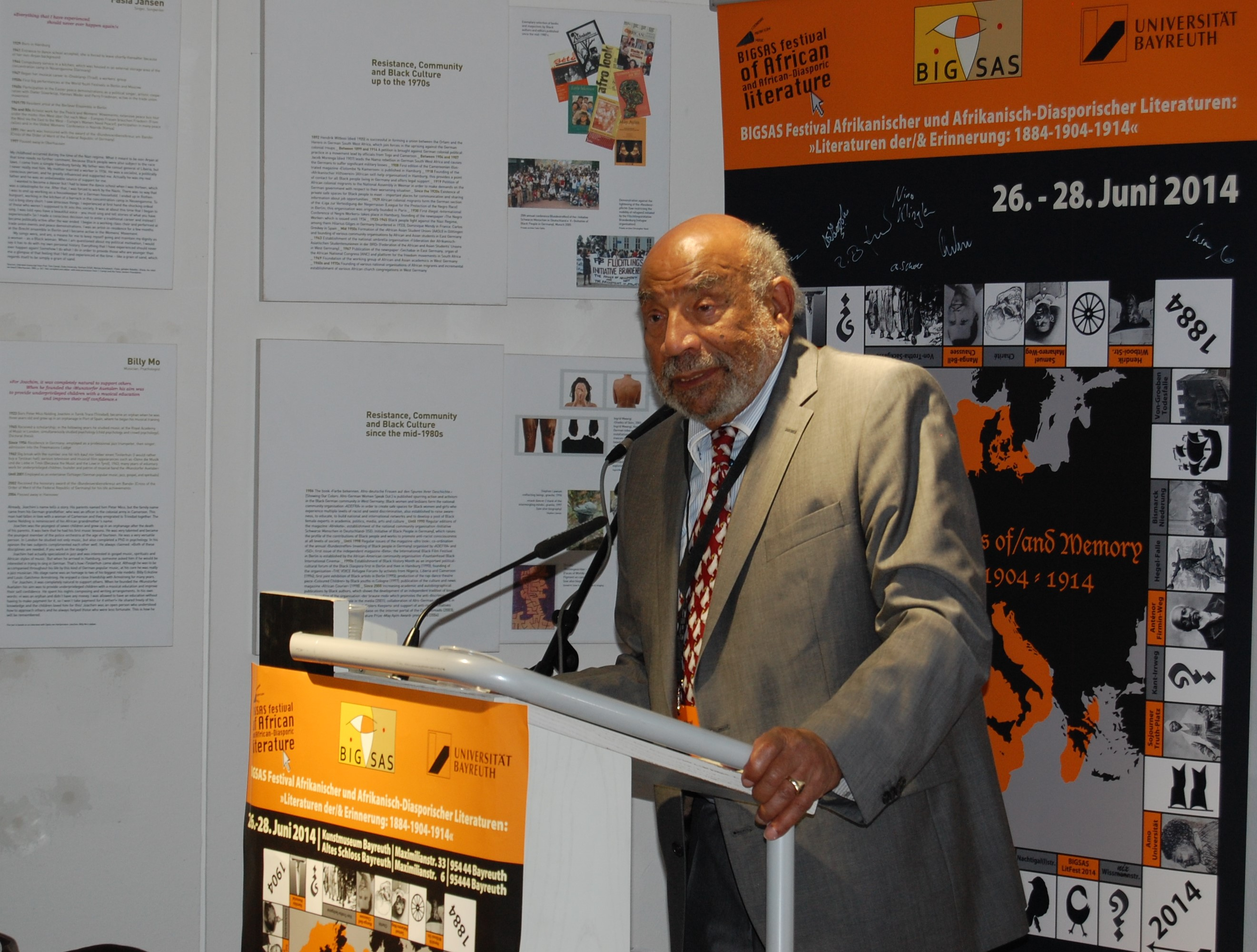
- Michael in 2014
- Born: 15 January 1925; Berlin, Germany
- Died: 19 October 2019 (aged 94); Cologne, Germany
- Known for: Journalist; activist; actor
- Movement: Africanist
- Parents: Theophilius Wonja Michael (father); Martha Wagner (mother)
- Awards: Black History Month Award (2009)

Theodor Wonja Michael (15 January 1925 – 19 October 2019) was a German child actor, journalist and public servant, as well as a prominent speaker on living as an Afro-German and a prisoner in Nazi forced labor camps during Nazi Germany.

== Life ==
Theodor Wonja Michael was born in Berlin in 1925 as the youngest son of the Cameroonian colonial migrant Theophilius Wonja Michael and his German wife Martha (née Wegner). He had three siblings: James (b. 1916), Juliana (b. 1921) and Christiana. Michael's father worked in human zoos where his son also had to perform in stereotypical African dress.

When his mother died in 1926, he grew up as a half-orphan with foster parents, who were the operators of a human zoo and used him there from 1927, at the age of two, as an extra. His father died in 1934 and the siblings were separated. Although he finished elementary school in 1939, he could not move further in education due to the Nuremberg Race Laws. He initially worked as a porter in a Berlin hotel, but was dismissed due to a guest's complaint about his skin colour. His German passport was revoked and he became stateless. He was not drafted into the Wehrmacht because of his skin colour. He earned his living as a circus actor and as an extra in colonial movies made by UFA. Until 1942 he made about 100 colonial movies on behalf of the Reich Ministry of Public Enlightenment and Propaganda which glorified the German colonial era. The films were shot in Germany with black actors and offered black Germans and African migrants employment and protection from persecution. Prisoners of war were also used. Theodor Wonja Michael was clear about the intention of the films: "We were the Moors you needed. For us this was a question of existence". He also played a minor role as an extra in the film Münchhausen (with Hans Albers and others). In 1943 he was imprisoned near Berlin and forced to labor until the labor camp was liberated by the Red Army in May 1945.

After 1945 he worked as a civilian employee for the US occupation troops and took on roles as an actor. He completed his high school diploma and studied political science in Hamburg and Paris with a degree in economics. One of his academic teachers was Ralf Dahrendorf. He then worked as a journalist and became editor-in-chief of the magazine Afrika Bulletin. In spite of a lack of formal education about Africa, he was asked to serve as an expert. Michael's independent study of African intellectuals, such as Kwame Nkrumah, and contemporary thought, such as Léopold Sédar Senghor's Négritude, led him to amass a personal library of nearly 700 volumes. The collection was donated to the University of Bayreuth, though the books were integrated into the library's catalogue rather than being preserved as a collection. He was also a government advisor to the SPD, a lecturer for the German Foundation for International Cooperation and a civil servant at the Federal Intelligence Service. By his own account, he was Germany's first black federal official in civil service. He also took on qualified acting roles in theatre, film, television and radio.

He only found his siblings Juliana and James again in the 1960s. Later he lived in Cologne and was an active member of the black German community. In 2013, Michael published his autobiography, Deutsch sein und schwarz dazu. Erinnerungen eines Afro-Deutschen, which has been translated into English as Black German: An Afro-German Life in the Twentieth Century, and subsequently appeared in many television programs. Michael spoke out against contemporary racial discrimination in Germany and argued for legal protections against race-based discrimination. In 2018, he was awarded the Order of Merit of the Federal Republic of Germany for his work as a contemporary witness to history.

== See also ==
- Afro-Germans
- Leila Negra
- Hans Massaquoi
