= We Make Music =

1942 film directed by Helmut Käutner

- Wir machen Musik (We make music); Header of the movie from 1942
- German: Wir machen Musik
- Directed by: Helmut Käutner
- Written by: Manfried Rössner (play); Hans Effenberger; Erich Ebermayer; Helmut Käutner
- Starring: Ilse Werner; Viktor de Kowa; Edith Oß; Grethe Weiser
- Cinematography: Jan Roth
- Edited by: Helmuth Schönnenbeck
- Music by: Peter Igelhoff; Adolf Steimel
- Production company: Terra Film
- Distributed by: Deutsche Filmvertriebs
- Release date: 8 October 1942
- Running time: 95 minutes
- Country: Germany
- Language: German

We Make Music (German: Wir machen Musik) is a 1942 German musical comedy film directed by Helmut Käutner, starring Ilse Werner, Viktor de Kowa and Edith Oß. It was shot at the Tempelhof Studios in Berlin. The film's sets were designed by the art directors Max Mellin and Gerhard Ladner.

== Plot ==
It is a revue film, loosely based on the stage work Karl III. und Anna von Österreich by Manfried Rössner. Karl Zimmermann, a composer whose idols are Johann Sebastian Bach and other classical composers, dreams of being successful with his own opera and composes popular music for fun, but does not try to publish it. His wife, Anni Pichler is a popular singer and secretly sells his popular songs so that they can make a living. When he finally completes his opera and it is rejected by the public, he realizes that his true talent is composing popular music and not dishonorable.

== Cast ==
- Ilse Werner as Anni Pichler
- Viktor de Kowa as Paul Zimmermann
- Edith Oß as Trude, a trumpeter
- Grethe Weiser as Monika Bratzberger
- Georg Thomalla as Franz Sperling
- Rolf Weih as Peter Schäfer
- Ilse Buhl as Alt-Saxophonist
- Sabine Naundorff as tenor-Saxophonist
- Hilde Adolphi as trombonist
- Gertrud Leonhardt as guitar player
- Eva Gotthardt as bass player
- Kurt Seifert as Hugo Bratzberger
- Victor Janson as Director Pröschke
- Lotte Werkmeister as Karl's landlady, Frau Zierbarth
- Helmuth Helsig as a chimney sweeper
- Ewald Wenck as Gasmann Knebel
- Wilhelm Bendow as stage manager
- Klaus Pohl as stagehand at the Oper
- Sonja Kuska as Barbara, a music teacher
- Otto Braml as chairman of examiners
- Curt Cappi as waiter Neumann
- Friedrich Wilhelm Dann as bus-conductor
- Hanne Fey as secretary of the music publishers
- Robert Forsch as Mehmann, director of the music publishers
- Karl Hannemann as director of the opera stage
- Sonja Kuske as Barbara, music student
- Karin Luesebrink as music student
- Artur Malkowsky as opera singer at the premiere
- Maria von Höslin as Peter's brother
- Helga Warnecke as music student
- Gertrud Seelhorst
- Hansi Würbauer
- Sabine André
- Ernst Schiffner
