= Robert Wuellner =

German actor and filmmaker (1885–1966)

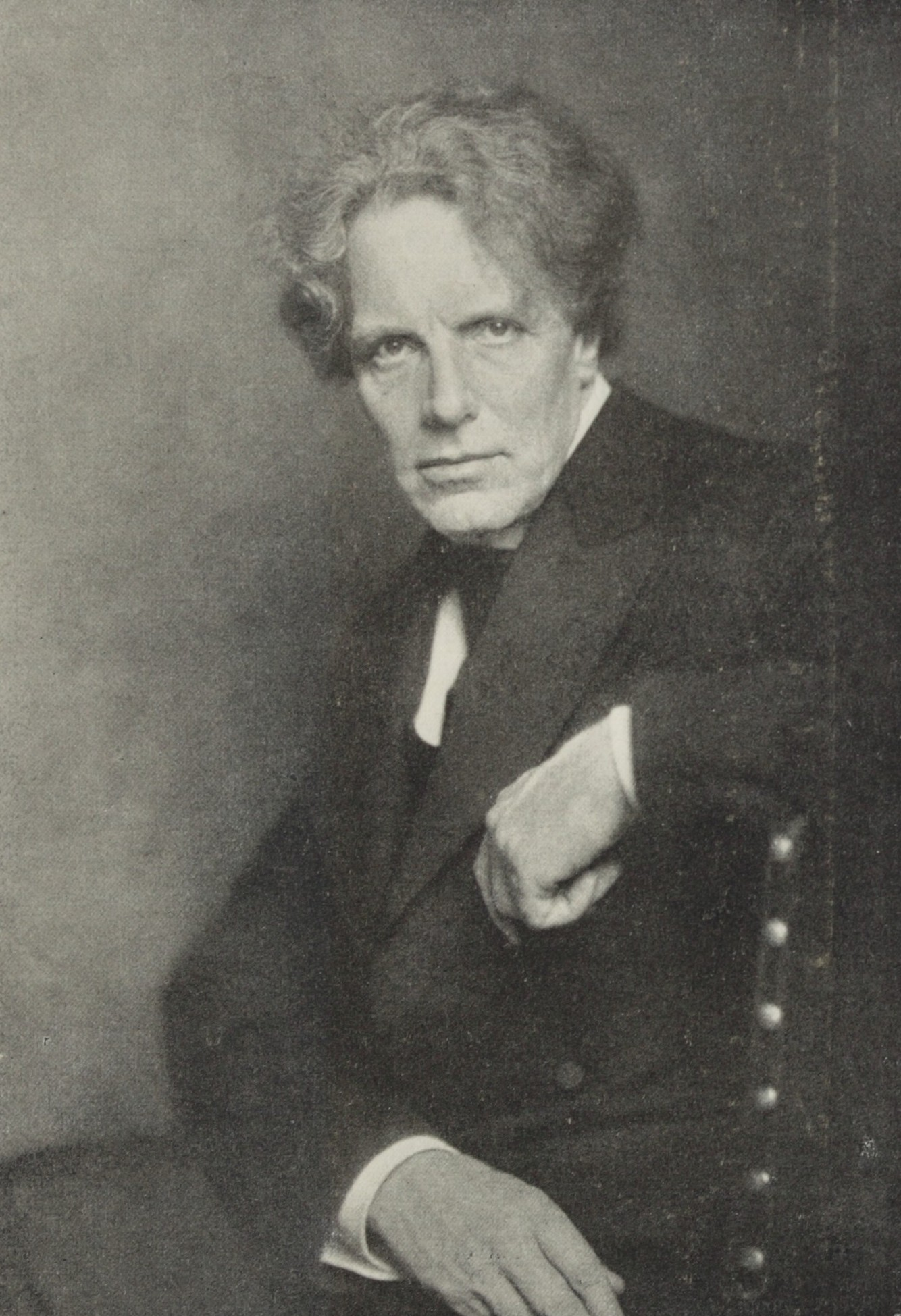
- Born: Robert Wyss; 25 October 1885; Lucerne, Switzerland
- Died: 11 August 1966 (aged 80); West Berlin, West Germany
- Other names: Robert Wüllner
- Occupations: Film actor; Film producer; Film director
- Years active: 1915–1950

Robert Wyss (25 October 1885 – 11 August 1966), known professionally as Robert Wuellner, was a Swiss actor, film producer and director. Wuellner acted or directed in several German silent films early in his career, such as The Golden Bullet. From 1928 onwards he concentrated on production and continued to work through the Weimar, Nazi and Post-war periods.

Wuellner then switched to film production. Initially active as a production manager, he worked together with his colleagues Karl Schulz and Erich Schicker as a producer for his and Schulz's company Schulz & Wuellner Film-Fabrikation und Vertrieb GmbH from 1931 to 1936. After this company had to be dissolved in 1937, Wuellner teamed up with fellow producer Hans-Herbert Ulrich and formed a joint production group with him until the beginning of 1938. Wuellner was subsequently given his own production group and in this capacity supervised films for the Tobis production company from 1939 until the end of the war in 1945, most recently in collaboration with the director Karl Anton.

== Selected filmography ==
=== Director ===
- The Golden Bullet (1921)
- Sins of Yesterday (1922)

=== Producer ===
- The Love of the Brothers Rott (1929)
- I'll Stay with You (1931)
- Alarm at Midnight (1931)
- Two Heavenly Blue Eyes (1932)
- The Page from the Dalmasse Hotel (1933)
- The Champion of Pontresina (1934)
- Roses from the South (1934)
- The Voice of Love (1934)
- A Girl Whirls By the World (1934)
- All Because of the Dog (1935)
- Dangerous Crossing (1937)
- A Girl from the Chorus (1937)
- Daphne and the Diplomat (1937)
- The Chief Witness (1937)
- Carousel (1937)
- The Scapegoat (1940)
- Battle Squadron Lützow (1941)
- Two in a Big City (1942)
- A Flea in Her Ear (1943)
- The Impostor (1944)
- Peter Voss, Thief of Millions (1946)
- The Appeal to Conscience (1949)

== Bibliography ==
- Kay Weniger: Das große Personenlexikon des Films. Die Schauspieler, Regisseure, Kameraleute, Produzenten, Komponisten, Drehbuchautoren, Filmarchitekten, Ausstatter, Kostümbildner, Cutter, Tontechniker, Maskenbildner und Special Effects Designer des 20. Jahrhunderts. Vol. 8: T – Z. David Tomlinson – Theo Zwierski. Schwarzkopf und Schwarzkopf, Berlin 2001, ISBN 3-89602-340-3, p. 472.
- Grange, William (2008). Cultural Chronicle of the Weimar Republic. Lanham, MD: Scarecrow Press. ISBN 978-0-8108-5967-8.
