= Karl Ludwig Diehl =

German actor (1896–1958)

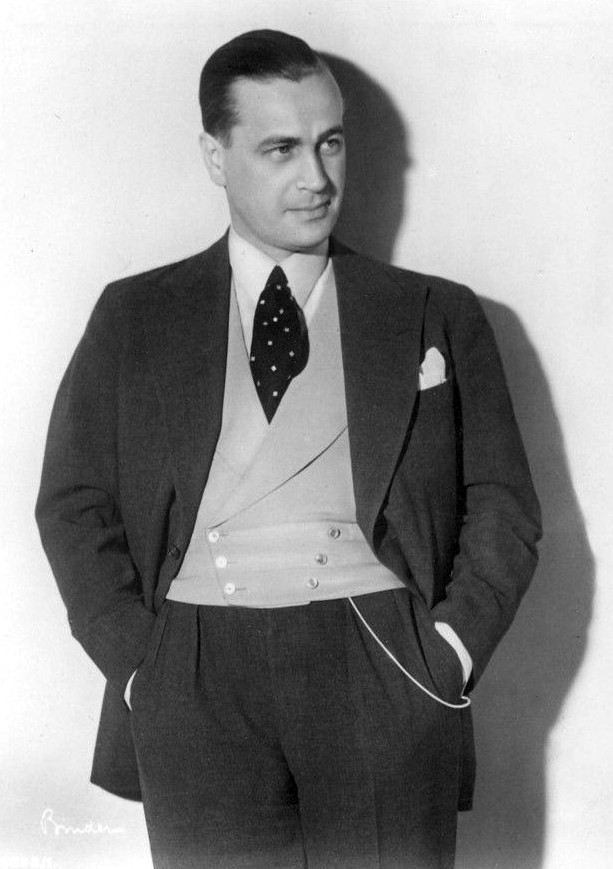
- Diehl ca. 1926
- Born: 14 August 1896; Halle an der Saale, German Empire
- Died: 8 March 1958 (aged 61); Gut Berghof/Penzberg, West Germany
- Occupation: Actor
- Years active: 1924–1957

Karl Ludwig Diehl (14 August 1896 – 8 March 1958) was a German film actor. He appeared in 66 films between 1924 and 1957. His father was Karl Diehl, the German professor of Anarchism.

== Filmography ==
- Die Tragödie der Entehrten (1924)
- The Blame (1924)
- Waltz of Love (1930) - Marshal
- Masks (1930) - Stuart Webbs
- Zärtlichkeit (1930) - Kerten
- The Love Waltz (1930) - Lord Chamberlain
- Love's Carnival (1930) - Oberleutnant Ferndinand von Grobitzsch
- The Copper (1930) - Snorry (German Version)
- Ash Wednesday (1931) - Hauptmann von Rochow
- Queen of the Night (1931) - Adjudant
- Circus Life (1931) - Luftakrobat
- Täter gesucht (1931) - Dr. Gregor, Redakteur
- The Squeaker (1931) - Captain Leslie
- In the Employ of the Secret Service (1931) - Wasiljeff, kaptajn
- Rasputin, Demon with Women (1932) - Fürst Jussupoff
- Two in a Car (1932) - Lord Kingsdale
- A Shot at Dawn (1932) - Petersen
- Scampolo (1932) - Maximilian
- The Secret of Johann Orth (1932) - Johann Salvator (Johann Orth)
- The Invisible Front (1933) - Erik Larsen
- Spies at Work (1933) - Michael von Hombergk, Generalstabsoffizier
- On Secret Service (1933) - Captain von Homberg
- Volldampf voraus! (1934) - Axel Gröning, Oberleutnant zur See, Kommandant
- The Girlfriend of a Big Man (1934) - Peters, Fabrikant
- Adventure on the Southern Express (1934) - Hans Lenzfeld, Speisewagenkellner
- A Man Wants to Get to Germany (1934) - Hagen
- Streak of Steel (1935) - Michael Tetjus
- Episode (1935) - Karl Kinz
- An Ideal Husband (1935) - Lord Robert Chiltern
- The Green Domino (1935) - Dr. Bruck
- The Higher Command (1935) - Rittmeister von Droste
- The Emperor's Candlesticks (1936) - Georg Wolenski
- His Daughter is Called Peter (1936) - Ingenieur Max Klaar
- Es geht um mein Leben (1936) - Rechtsanwalt Dr. Edmund Lessner
- The Ways of Love Are Strange (1937) - Hauptmann Costali / Haushofmeister Archibald
- Love Can Lie (1937) - Ivar Andersson
- Another World (1937) - Prinz Selim
- The Man Who Couldn't Say No (1938) - Memmo Speranza
- The False Step (1939) - Baron von Instetten
- A Hopeless Case (1939) - Professor Dr. Bruchsal
- The Fox of Glenarvon (1940) - Baron John Ennis of Loweland
- The Swedish Nightingale (1941) - Count Rantzan
- Annelie (1941) - Dr. Martin Laborius
- Was geschah in dieser Nacht (1941) - Johannes Petersen
- The Big Game (1942) - SS-Mann
- Die Entlassung (1942) - Kaiser Friederich III.
- 5 June (1942) - Generalmajor Lüchten
- Nacht ohne Abschied (1943) - Oberst Gösta Knudson, Schwadronführer
- The Impostor (1944) - Michael Jürgens
- Wo ist Herr Belling? (1945) - Herr von Seidel
- The Appeal to Conscience (1949) - Kriminalrat Husfeld
- The Trip to Marrakesh (1949) - Professor Colbert
- The Accusation (1950) - Massimo Ruska
- Das seltsame Leben des Herrn Bruggs (1951) - Herr von Seidel - Schwager Bruggs
- My Heart Sings (1951) - Neurologo
- Until We Meet Again (1952) - Prof. Stauffer
- Beloved Life (1953) - Oberst von Bolin
- A Love Story (1954) - Oberst Kessler, Regiments-Kommandeur
- The Man of My Life (1954) - Professor Bergstetten
- Victoria in Dover (1954) - Lord Melbourne - Prime Minister
- Secrets of the City (1955) - Prof. Siebrecht
- The Devil's General (1955) - Generaldirektor Hugo Mohrungen
- Jackboot Mutiny (1955) - Generaloberst a.D. Beck
- Bandits of the Autobahn (1955) - Polizeirat Gerber
- My Leopold (1955) - Schwalbach, Banker
- My Sixteen Sons (1956) - Dr. Wesendahl
