= Franz Weber (actor) =

German actor (1888–1962)

- Born: 24 March 1888; Haspe, German Empire
- Died: 10 August 1962 (aged 74); West Berlin, West Germany
- Occupation: Actor
- Years active: 1920–1960 (film)

Franz Weber (24 March 1888 – 10 August 1962) was a German actor who appeared in more than a hundred films during a lengthy screen career that started in the late silent era and continued for several decades of the sound era that followed. He appeared in a diverse range of productions which encompassed the Weimar, Nazi and post-war (both East and West Germany) eras.

== Selected filmography ==
- There Is a Woman Who Never Forgets You (1930)
- Panic in Chicago (1931)
- Berlin-Alexanderplatz (1931)
- Weekend in Paradise (1931)
- The Trunks of Mr. O.F. (1931)
- The Spanish Fly (1931)
- Spell of the Looking Glass (1932)
- Little Girl, Great Fortune (1933)
- Paganini (1934)
- The Two Seals (1934)
- Such a Rascal (1934)
- Gypsy Blood (1934)
- The Island (1934)
- The Brenken Case (1934)
- The Double (1934)
- Dreams of Love (1935)
- Pillars of Society (1935)
- A Strange Guest (1936)
- A Doctor of Conviction (1936)
- Family Parade (1936)
- Intermezzo (1936)
- Capers (1937)
- Freight from Baltimore (1938)
- Triad (1938)
- Dance on the Volcano (1938)
- Yvette (1938)
- Target in the Clouds (1939)
- Wibbel the Tailor (1939)
- Renate in the Quartet (1939)
- Detours to Happiness (1939)
- Liberated Hands (1939)
- Her First Experience (1939)
- The Leghorn Hat (1939)
- Clothes Make the Man (1940)
- The Fox of Glenarvon (1940)
- Small Town Poet (1940)
- The Gasman (1941)
- The Girl from Fano (1941)
- Love Me (1942)
- The Thing About Styx (1942)
- Diesel (1942)
- Between Heaven and Earth (1942)
- A Salzburg Comedy (1943)
- An Old Heart Becomes Young Again (1943)
- Laugh Bajazzo (1943)
- Melody of a Great City (1943)
- A Flea in Her Ear (1943)
- The Bath in the Barn (1943)
- The Wedding Hotel (1944)
- That Was My Life (1944)
- A Cheerful House (1944)
- Summer Nights (1944)
- Young Hearts (1944)
- In Those Days (1947)
- The Marriage of Figaro (1949)
- The Beaver Coat (1949)
- The Great Mandarin (1949)
- A Rare Lover (1950)
- Before Sundown (1956)

== Bibliography ==
- Giesen, Rolf. Nazi Propaganda Films: A History and Filmography. McFarland, 2003.
