= Wunschkonzert =

- Directed by: Eduard von Borsody
- Written by: Felix Lützkendorf; Eduard von Borsody; Joseph Goebbels (uncredited)
- Produced by: Felix Pfitzner for Cine-Allianz Tonfilmproduktions GmbH
- Starring: Ilse Werner; Carl Raddatz; Joachim Brennecke
- Cinematography: Günther Anders; Carl Drews; Franz Weihmayr
- Edited by: Elisabeth Neumann
- Music by: Werner Bochmann (original music); Eugen Jochum (musical director)
- Distributed by: Universum Film-Verleih GmbH
- Release date: 30 December 1940
- Running time: 103 minutes
- Country: Germany
- Language: German
- Box office: 7.6 million RM (equivalent to 34 million 2021 euros)

Wunschkonzert (Request Concert) is a 1940 German drama propaganda film by Eduard von Borsody. After The Great Love, it was the most popular film of wartime Germany, reaching the second highest gross.

== Background ==
The popular music show Wunschkonzert für die Wehrmacht (Request Concert for the Wehrmacht) was broadcast on the German radio network every Sunday afternoon at 3.00 from the Great Broadcasting Room of the Haus des Rundfunks on Masurenallee in Berlin. Its popularity was based in part on its claims to broadcast music requested by men in the armed forces, thus uniting the armed forces and the homefront in Volksgemeinschaft. Reich Minister Goebbels insisted that all German performers contribute to it, and concluded that a film based on it would be even more successful.

== Plot ==
During the 1936 Summer Olympics in Berlin, the young Inge Wagner and Luftwaffe Fliegerleutnant (Flight Lieutenant) Herbert Koch meet, and within a few days fall in love. They make plans for their joint future, but before they can get married, Herbert is seconded to the Condor Legion and ordered to the Spanish Civil War; he is forced to leave immediately without giving Inge any explanation. The mission is top secret and all contact with home is forbidden, including by letter, and he is unable to contact her with an explanation. When after several months the operation is over, and Herbert is recovering from a severe injury, he is at last able to write to Inge, but she has moved in the meantime and he is unable to trace her.

Inge meanwhile is unable to forget Herbert, and is prepared to wait for him. Three years go by. When the war begins with the Invasion of Poland in 1939, the men from Inge's area all go off to the front, including Inge's childhood friend, Helmut Winkler, whose proposal of marriage she has turned down, but who continues to hope for her hand. Helmut is assigned to a Squadron where he is put directly under Herbert, who has meanwhile been promoted to Hauptmann (Group Captain). The two become friends, not knowing that they both love the same girl.

Since the beginning of the war, a big musical event has taken place in Berlin every week, which is broadcast on the radio as Wunschkonzert für die Wehrmacht and provides a channel for greetings and messages between the front and home. When Herbert, remembering the beautiful days with Inge, asks for the Olympic fanfares, Inge, who is listening at home like every one else, hears it and is encouraged by this sudden sign out of the blue to discover Herbert's whereabouts, with renewed hope of seeing him again. They exchange letters, and arrange to meet in Hamburg.

However, at the last moment before the meeting, Herbert and Helmut are both ordered off on a reconnaissance flight over the Atlantic and are shot down. A German U-boat picks them up. Meanwhile, Inge is waiting in vain. Helmut is taken wounded to the military hospital, where all three meet in his sickroom. After sorting out the confused situation – Herbert assumes that Inge and Helmut are engaged – the two lovers are reunited.

== Cast ==
Starring roles were played by Ilse Werner as Inge Wagner, Carl Raddatz as Herbert Koch, and Joachim Brennecke as Helmut Winkler.

Other actors were Hedwig Bleibtreu (Frau Wagner), Ida Wüst (Frau Eichhorn), Hans Hermann Schaufuß (Hammer), Hans Adalbert Schlettow (Kramer), Malte Jaeger (Friedrich), Walter Ladengast (Schwarzkopf), Albert Florath (Physician), Elise Aulinger (Frau Schwarzkopf), Wilhelm Althaus (Captain Freiburg), Walter Bechmann (Waiter), Günther Lüders (Zimmermann), Erwin Biegel (Justav), Vera Hartegg (Frau Friedrich), Vera Complojer (Frau Hammer), Aribert Mog, and Ewald Wenck.

== Music ==
Many well-known artists appear as themselves in the request concert programme section, hosted by Heinz Goedecke:

- Marika Rökk: "In einer Nacht im Mai" (song from the 1938 film A Night in May (Eine Nacht im Mai)
- Hans Brausewetter, Heinz Rühmann, Josef Sieber: "Das kann doch einen Seemann nicht erschüttern" (song from the 1939 film Bachelor's Paradise (Paradies der Junggesellen)
- Berlin Philharmonic, conducted by Eugen Jochum: overture to the opera The Marriage of Figaro
- Weiß Ferdl: "Bin ich froh, ich bin kein Intellektueller" (I'm so glad I'm no intellectual)
- Paul Hörbiger: "Apoloner, Apoloner bist Du"
- Wilhelm Strienz: "Gute Nacht, Mutter"

== Nazi propaganda ==
Wunschkonzert was officially classified as "Politically valuable", "Artistically valuable", "Valuable for the people", and "Valuable for youth", which by Nazi standards put it close to the rank of a major propaganda film such as Karl Ritter's Stukas (1941). After World War II, the Allied Control Council, which, in 1945, subjected all German-language films then on release to an ideological examination, banned its performance. It was released later in West Germany with clearance from the FSK motion picture rating system.

The love story in itself was innocuous, and was intended only to strengthen morale at the home front, particularly among women who thought of their loved ones on the front. With this film (her 11th), Ilse Werner tightened her grip on star status, and added to her image the role of the "girl back home", faithfully enduring. Although she had at first turned the part down, her collaboration in this film cost her, in 1945, a performance ban, albeit temporary.

Its real political force was due to other elements of image and plot not immediately apparent from a straightforward storyline summary. The film historians Francis Courtade and Pierre Cadars quote, an unknown writer, who describes the film as follows: "This "harmless-homeloving" film contains in palatable form just about everything that was dear to the Third Reich, with the exception of anti-Semitism".

Friedemann Beyer also describes it as a "paradigm of the National Sozialist cinema". The blend of distracting escapist entertainment on the one hand and naked propaganda on the other makes Wunschkonzert one of the most significant products of Nazi film politics.

In the first section, against the background of the opening of the Olympic Games, the film contains documentary images of Hitler with adoring crowds, subjectively reminiscent of Leni Riefenstahl's propaganda films; the Olympic scenes include actual footage from Riefenstahl's film "Olympia". Later, in the war scenes, original newsreel footage is used. The film is also openly propagandistic in the scenes in which the men go off to war: these scenes convey on the one hand a spirit of readiness for self-sacrifice, and on the other, one of carefree singing and jollity, as though going on a great adventure. Echt deutsche Gefühlsinnigkeit ("genuine German sensibility") is celebrated in another scene, in which Schwarzkopf, a young pianist, plays Beethoven to a house-party in farewell. He later dies an operatically staged heroic death, playing the organ in a church to guide his comrades, thus diverting the enemy to himself. This depiction of an actual German soldier's death was unusual for German film and carefully glamorized.

The real main theme of the film however is German Volksgemeinschaft ("people's community", a specifically Nazi term), the inner bond between home and the front, and the participation of every level of society. The role of Nazism in bringing about this happy unity is underscored when Inge's aunt recounts how she could not marry a lover of higher social class, Inge wonders if such things are possible, and the aunt declares they were—in those days. The classes also, however unified in purpose, are still recognizable; the lower classes are simple souls, obeying orders at the front and being clowns at home, while the hero is a dignified person of high status.

The request concert, as the bridge between the two, and, indeed, the love story between a civilian girl and a fighting man, are really just symbols for the greater whole. Consequently, the film closes, not just on the images of the idyll of love, but with battleships, bomber squadrons, swastika banners, and the patriotic song "Denn wir fahren gegen Engelland" (Hermann Löns' "Matrosenlied" (1912) to the 1939 melody by Herms Niel.

== Production and reception ==
The former Reich Film Superintendent Fritz Hippler characterised the film – after 1945 – not only as a state-commissioned film, but as: "Goebbels' pet child. He had worked on the screenplay, written dialogue, and specified particular singers and music to be presented in the great set pieces. Since he prized Ilse Werner above all as the 'sympathetic model of a modern woman', he was completely besotted with that piece of casting."

The director Eduard von Borsody, who otherwise mostly specialised in adventure films, had recommended himself to the Nazi regime by his work on the films Morgenrot (1933, pre-dating the Nazi seizure of control), Refugees (1933), and Rubber (1938).

Shooting began on 16 July 1940. On 21 December, the completed film was laid before the Filmprüfstelle (original edition: 2,832 metres, 103 minutes), which classified it as fit for youth viewing. The premiere took place on 30 December 1940 in a Berlin showpiece cinema, the Ufa-Palast am Zoo. Distribution was managed by the Universum-Film Verleih GmbH. On 4 November 1943, the film was again presented to the Filmprüfstelle in a shortened version (2,689 metres, 98 minutes), and in this version, too, was classified as suitable for minors.

In the original version, the film was entitled "Das Wunschkonzert" ("The Request Concert"), but this was replaced when the film was advertised by the snappier-sounding "Wunschkonzert".

Next to the Zarah Leander film The Great Love, Wunschkonzert was the most commercially successful film production during the Nazi regime: By the end of World War II, the film had been seen by almost 26 million people, and taken 7.6 million Reichsmarks (equivalent to 34 million 2021 euros).

At its presentation to the FSK on 24 January 1980 (2,720 metres, 99 minutes), the film was cleared as suitable for showing on public holidays, and for those aged 16 and over (Prüf-Nr. 51284). After a re-edit (2,756 metres, 101 minutes), it was presented again to the FSK on 22 January 1997, when it was re-classified as suitable for those aged 18 and over (Prüf-Nr. 51284). The rights have been taken over by Transit-Verleih GmbH.
