= Black Forest Children =

1922 film

- Directed by: Leo Peukert
- Produced by: Heinrich Bolten-Baeckers
- Production company: BB-Film-Fabrikation
- Distributed by: BB-Film-Fabrikation
- Release date: 18 October 1922
- Country: Germany
- Languages: Silent; German intertitles

Black Forest Children (German: Schwarzwaldkinder) is a 1922 German silent film directed by Leo Peukert.

== Cast ==
In alphabetical order

- Leona Bergere as Pfarrerin
- Hilde Hildebrand as Liesbeth, Tochter von Nikodemus Grieshaber
- Carl Heinz Klubertanz as Hans-Jakob, Sohn vom Bürgermeister
- Erich Kämmerer as Gemeindediener
- Richard Ludwig as Schröder, fürstlicher Gutsverwalter
- Gustav Rudolph as Nikodemus Grieshaber, Großbauer
- Hans Stock as Schorsch Grieshaber, Bürgermeister
- Max Winter as Pfarrer

== Bibliography ==
- Bock, Hans-Michael; Töteberg, Michael, eds. (1994) [1992]. Das Ufa-Buch: Kunst und Krisen, Stars und Regisseure, Wirtschaft und Politik (in German). Frankfurt: Zweitausendeins. ISBN 978-3-86150-065-0.
