= Vera Complojer =

Austrian actress

- Born: 16 August 1896; Klagenfurt, Austro-Hungarian Empire
- Died: 6 April 1969 (aged 72); Salzburg, Austria
- Occupation: Actress
- Years active: 1933-1968 (film & TV)

Vera Complojer (1896–1969) was an Austrian stage and film actress.

== Selected filmography ==
- Maria Ilona (1939)
- The Golden Mask (1939)
- Her First Experience (1939)
- Detours to Happiness (1939)
- Wunschkonzert (1940)
- The Sinful Village (1940)
- Left of the Isar, Right of the Spree (1940)
- The Waitress Anna (1941)
- The Way to Freedom (1941)
- Melody of a Great City (1943)
- Wild Bird (1943)
- The White Adventure (1952)
- The Poacher of the Silver Wood (1957)
- Salzburg Stories (1957)
- The Spessart Inn (1958)
- Sebastian Kneipp (1958)
- I Must Go to the City (1962)
- The Merry Wives of Tyrol (1964)
- Der Weibsteufel (1966)
- The Murderer with the Silk Scarf (1966)

== Bibliography ==
- Giesen, Rolf. Nazi Propaganda Films: A History and Filmography. McFarland, 2003.
