= Today Is the Day (film) =

1933 film

- Directed by: Kurt Gerron
- Written by: Philipp Lothar Mayring; Wolfgang Wilhelm
- Produced by: Eugen Kürschner
- Starring: Hans Albers; Luise Rainer; Oskar Karlweis
- Cinematography: Bruno Mondi
- Edited by: Milo Harbich
- Music by: Walter Jurmann; Bronislau Kaper; Paul Mann; Stefan Weiß
- Production company: Boston-Films
- Release date: 17 March 1933
- Running time: 86 minutes
- Country: Germany
- Language: German

Today Is the Day (German: Heut' kommt's drauf an) is a 1933 German comedy film directed by Kurt Gerron and starring Hans Albers, Luise Rainer and Oskar Karlweis. It features a number of jazz interludes. The film's sets were designed by the art directors Max Knaake and Julius von Borsody.

It premiered at the Gloria-Palast in Berlin. It was shot between December 1932 and January 1933 during the final months of the Weimar Republic. Despite its popular success the incoming Propaganda Minister Joseph Goebbels described it as "terrible rubbish". Due to their Jewish background a number of those involved with the film, including the director Gerron and star Rainer, left Germany after the Nazi takeover.

== Plot ==
Hannes Eckmann, the leader of a Hamburg jazz group heads for Berlin to take part in a competition. He encounters Marita Costa, the leader of an all-female band, and falls for her. After discovering she is short of a dancer for a performance, he steps into the role and is a big success. However, when she discovers his real identity as a rival conductor, she believes it is all part of an underhand scheme to sabotage her ahead of the big competition.

== Cast ==
- Hans Albers as Hannes Eckmann
- Luise Rainer as Marita Costa
- Oskar Karlweis as Peter Schlemm
- Oskar Sima as Basil, Maritas Impresario
- Max Gülstorff as Generaldirektor Bourth
- Baby Gray as Anni, die 'Puppe'
- Weintraub Syncopators as Themselves
- Arthur Bergen
- Teddy Bill
- Albert Fischer
- Max Grünberg
- Mario Guido
- Philipp Manning
- Hanna Maron
- Loni Michelis
- Josef Peterhans
- Werner Pledath
- Ludwig Trautmann
- Nico Turoff
- Michael von Newlinsky

== Bibliography ==
- Bock, Hans-Michael & Bergfelder, Tim. The Concise Cinegraph: Encyclopaedia of German Cinema. Berghahn Books, 2009.
- Moeller, Felix. The Film Minister: Goebbels and the Cinema in the Third Reich. Edition Axel Menges, 2000.
