= Baby Gray =

German actress

- Born: 20 December 1907; Berlin, German Empire
- Occupations: Actress, singer
- Years active: 1933–1938 (film)

Baby Gray was a German singer and film actress. Born on 20 December 1907, she became popular for her work in early German films.

== Selected filmography ==
- Today Is the Day (1933)
- The Flower of Hawaii (1933)
- The Two Seals (1934)
- Adventure on the Southern Express (1934)
- Adventure in Warsaw (1937)

== Bibliography ==
- Goble, Alan. The Complete Index to Literary Sources in Film. Walter de Gruyter, 1999.
