= Vera Hartegg =

German writer and actress

- Born: 28 May 1902; Strasbourg, Alsace-Lorraine, German Empire
- Died: 1 October 1981 (aged 79); Baden-Baden, Baden-Württemberg, West Germany
- Occupations: Actress, writer
- Years active: 1935–1955 (film)

Vera Hartegg (28 May 1902 – 1 October 1981) was a German writer and stage and film actress. She was the daughter of the famous writer, diplomat, secret councilor and impostor Ernst von Hesse-Wartegg and his long-time mistress, actress Elvira Weiss (stage name Ella Kobold). The fact that she was Hesse-Wartegg's only child was only revealed through intensive research by a journalist in 2012. Hartegg hadn't mentioned her parents' names in her autobiography, which was a bestseller in Germany during the 1960s and 1970s with numerous editions.

== Selected filmography ==
- All Because of the Dog (1935)
- By a Silken Thread (1938)
- The Woman at the Crossroads (1938)
- A Woman Like You (1939)
- Liberated Hands (1939)
- The Fire Devil (1940)
- Wunschkonzert (1940)

== Books ==
- Es ist nicht gelogen. Der Roman einer Schauspielerin. ("It is Not a Lie. An Actress' Novel.") Berlin 1938. Autobiographical Novel.
- Warum. ("Why.") Berlin 1940. Novel
- Oriane. Berlin 1941. Novel
- Ein Glücksrad dreht sich in Paris. ("A Wheel of Fortune Spins in Paris." Comedy in three acts, stage work) 1953. TV-movie 1958.
- Drei Väter und ich armes Kind. ("Three Fathers and me Poor Child") Munich 1961. (Autobiography pt. 1)
- Vornehmstes Haus am Platze. Lulus Memoiren. ("Most Noble House in the Place. Lulu's Memoir.") München 1964. (Autobiography pt. 2)
- Kleine Formen. ("Small Forms." Poems) Berlin 1974.

== Bibliography ==
- Giesen, Rolf. Nazi Propaganda Films: A History and Filmography. McFarland, 2003.
- Andreas Dutz, Elisabeth Dutz: Ernst von Hesse-Wartegg (1851–1918). Reiseschriftsteller, Wissenschaftler, Lebemann. Vienna 2017 (with a short biography about his daughter Vera Hartegg)
