= The Two Seals =

1934 film

- Directed by: Fred Sauer
- Written by: Reinhold Meißner; Carl Rössler (play)
- Produced by: Franz Vogel
- Starring: Weiß Ferdl; Harry Gondi; Walter Steinbeck
- Cinematography: Georg Krause
- Edited by: Erich Palme
- Music by: Walter Ulfig
- Production company: Euphono-Film
- Distributed by: Neue Deutsch Lichtspiel-Syndikat
- Release date: 19 December 1934
- Running time: 94 minutes
- Country: Germany
- Language: German

The Two Seals (German: Die beiden Seehunde) is a 1934 German comedy film directed by Fred Sauer and starring Weiß Ferdl, Harry Gondi, and Walter Steinbeck. The film's sets were designed by the art directors Kurt Dürnhöfer and Otto Moldenhauer.

== Synopsis ==
The unpopular ruler of a small principality has his doppelganger take over the reins of government.

== Cast ==
- Weiß Ferdl as Christian XVII.
- Harry Gondi as Johannes
- Walter Steinbeck as Graf Berka
- Franz Stein as Dr. Spärlich
- Hadrian Maria Netto as Presch
- Georgia Lind as Eva
- Paul Westermeier as Oberauer
- Else Lüders as Frau Oberauer
- Franz Weber as Leibkammerdiener
- Fita Benkhoff as Thekla
- Baby Gray as Käte
- Walter Gross as Fritz
- Gerhard Bienert as Friese
- Wilhelm Bendow as Polizeikommissär
- Albert Hörrmann as Polizist
- Erich Fiedler
- Arthur Reppert
- Willy Mendau
- Dodo van Doeren
- Josef Reithofer
- Katja Bennefeld
- Carlo Wydey
- Walter Lieck

== Bibliography ==
- Waldman, Harry (2008). Nazi Films in America, 1933–1942. Jefferson, NC: McFarland. ISBN 978-0-7864-3861-7.
