= Stars of Variety =

1939 film

- Directed by: Josef von Báky
- Written by: Attila Orbók; Erich Willke; Thea von Harbou
- Produced by: Heinz Landsmann; Antal Takács
- Starring: La Jana; Christl Mardayn; Karin Hardt
- Cinematography: István Eiben
- Edited by: Wolfgang Becker
- Music by: Georg Haentzschel
- Production companies: Pictura-Film; Hunnia Filmgyár
- Distributed by: Märkische Film
- Release dates: 30 March 1939 (Hungary); 14 April 1939 (Germany)
- Running time: 86 minutes
- Countries: Germany; Hungary
- Language: German

Stars of Variety (German: Menschen vom Varieté, Hungarian: A varieté csillagai) is a 1939 German-Hungarian drama film directed by Josef von Báky and starring La Jana, Christl Mardayn and Karin Hardt. It was shot at the Hunnia Studios in Budapest. The film's sets were designed by the art directors Robert A. Dietrich and Artur Günther. Separate German and Hungarian-language versions were produced.

== Cast ==
=== German version ===
- La Jana as Silvia Castellani
- Christl Mardayn as Alice Mc'Lean
- Karin Hardt as Gloria Mc'Lean
- Hans Holt as Freddy Danz
- Attila Hörbiger as Jack Carey
- Edith Oß as Ruby Mc'Lean
- Hans Moser as Miller - stage manager
- Jack Trevor as Jeffrey Keats
- Victor Janson as Manager of Variety
- Willi Schur as Serna - Dompteur
- Hans Adalbert Schlettow as Tom
- Rudolf Klein-Rogge as police inspector
- Erwin Biegel as Kellner in der Artistenpension
- Eduard von Winterstein as Theaterarzt
- Else Ehser as Emilie Schmitz - Dresser
- Julia Serda as Frau Turner
- Franz Gamberti as Körting - Requisiteur
- Michael von Newlinsky as Waiter in the restaurant
- Klaus Pohl as Varietéarzt
- Terry Carlton as Steptanz-Paar
- Tommy Ovary as Steptanz-Paar

=== Hungarian version ===
- Bella Bordy as Silvia Costelloni
- Pál Jávor as Jack Casey
- Antal Páger as Keats
- Erzsi Simor as Alice McLean
- Zita Szeleczky as Gloria
- Gerö Mály as Miller - Stage manager
- Piroska Vaszary as Schmitz - Dresser
- István Bársony as - Dompteur
- Béla Fáy as Detective
- Éva Libertiny as Girl in Variety
- Mária Lázár as Ruby
- Zoltán Szakáts as Police inspector
- Lajos Ujváry as Mátyás - Husband of Guesthouse woman
- Zoltán Várkonyi as Freddy Sanz

== Bibliography ==
- Klaus, Ulrich J. Deutsche Tonfilme: Jahrgang 1939. Klaus-Archiv, 1988.
- Rentschler, Eric. The Ministry of Illusion: Nazi Cinema and Its Afterlife. Harvard University Press, 1996.
- Waldman, Harry. Nazi Films in America, 1933–1942. McFarland, 2008.
