= Ilse Werner =

Dutch-German actress, singer, and musical whistler

- UFA press photo
- Born: Ilse Charlotte Still; 11 July 1921; Batavia, Dutch East Indies (now Jakarta, Indonesia)
- Died: 8 August 2005 (aged 84); Lübeck, Germany
- Occupations: Actress, singer
- Years active: 1937–2003

Signature
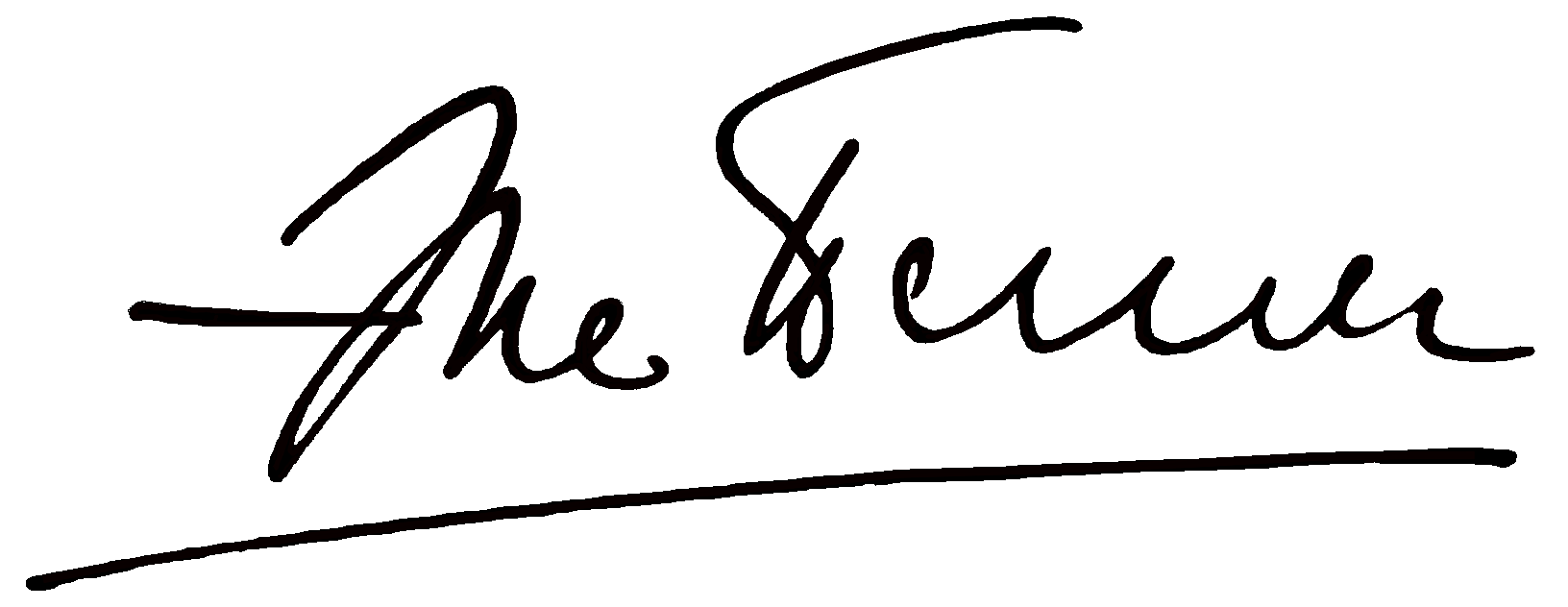

Ilse Werner (German: [ˈɪl.zə ˈvɛʁ.nɐ]; born Ilse Charlotte Still, 11 July 1921 – 8 August 2005) was a Dutch-German actress, singer, and musical whistler.

== Life ==
She was born in Batavia (present-day Jakarta, Indonesia) to a Dutch father, merchant and plantation owner, and a German mother. Werner was Dutch by birth; although she lived most of her life and spent her career with great successes in Austria and Germany, mainly during the time of the Third Reich. She did not assume West German citizenship until 1955.

Arriving in Frankfurt, Germany at the age of 10, Werner's family in 1934 moved to Vienna, where she attended the Max Reinhardt Seminar drama school and gave her debut at the Theater in der Josefstadt in 1937. She later made her name at the legendary UFA Studios near Berlin. She starred in popular wartime films including Die schwedische Nachtigall ("The Swedish Nightingale"), Wir machen Musik ("We're Making Music"), the musical drama Große Freiheit Nr. 7 and Münchhausen. She was the hostess of a popular television show of Fernsehsender Paul Nipkow from 1941, titled "Wir senden Frohsinn - Wir spenden Freude".

Having briefly been barred from performing by the Allies at the end of World War II, due to her alleged role in Nazi propaganda, she returned to the big screen in the 1950s where she excelled in dramatic character roles. She also acted in theatre, worked as a dubbing actor, and recorded numerous songs and whistling performances.

Werner had her last appearance on German TV in 2001. She later lived in a retirement home in Lübeck, where she died peacefully in her sleep on 7 August 2005, having suffered from pneumonia. Her last wish was to have her ashes scattered in Potsdam-Babelsberg, near the film studios.

== Selected filmography ==
- Die unruhigen Mädchen (1938)
- Das Leben kann so schön sein (1938)
- Frau Sixta (1938)
- Bel Ami (1939)
- Three Fathers for Anna (1939)
- Her First Experience (1939)
- Bal pare (1940)
- Wunschkonzert (1940)
- The Swedish Nightingale (1941)
- We Make Music (1942)
- Wedding in Barenhof (1942)
- Münchhausen (1943)
- Große Freiheit Nr. 7 (1944)
- Tell the Truth (1946)
- Mysterious Shadows (1949)
- The Orplid Mystery (1950)
- The Disturbed Wedding Night (1950)
- Queen of the Night (1951)
- Mutter sein dagegen sehr! (1951)
- The Bird Seller (1953)
- Annie from Tharau (1954)
- Reaching for the Stars (1955)
- The Mistress of Solderhof (1956)
- Rivalen der Rennbahn (TV series, 1989)
- Die Hallo-Sisters (1990)

== Dubbing ==
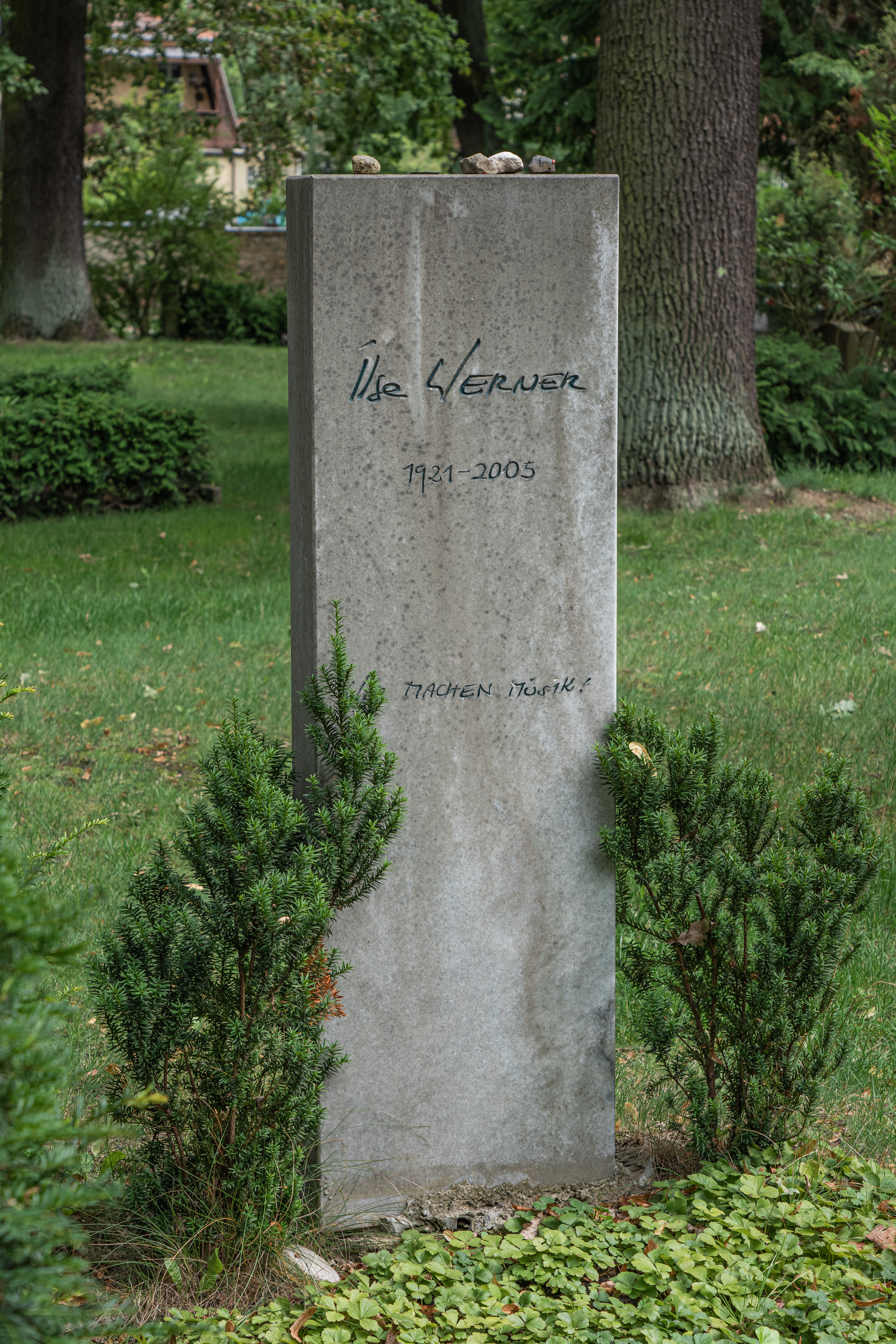
Gravestone of Ilse Werner in Potsdam

After the war, she became an active voice dubber, dubbing foreign films into the German language.

- 1948 - Gene Tierney in Laura (1944)
- 1949 - Margaret Lindsay in The Spoilers (1942) - (Die Freibeuterin)
- 1949 - Gale Sondergaard in The Mark of Zorro (1940) - (Im Zeichen des Zorro)
- 1950 - Olivia de Havilland in The Adventures of Robin Hood (1938) - (Robin Hood, König der Vagabunden)
- 1950 - Maureen O'Hara in The Black Swan (1942) - (Der Seeräuber)
- 1950 - Paulette Goddard in Reap the Wild Wind (1942) - (Piraten im Karibischen Meer)
- 1950 - Rita Hayworth in My Gal Sal (1942) - (Die Königin vom Broadway)
- 1950 - Maureen O'Hara in Buffalo Bill (1944) - (Buffalo Bill, der weiße Indianer)
- 1950 - Linden Travers in Christopher Columbus (1949)
- 1952 - Gale Storm in The Texas Rangers (1951) - (Grenzpolizei in Texas)
