= Detours to Happiness =

1939 film

- Directed by: Fritz Peter Buch
- Written by: Fritz Peter Buch; L.A.C. Müller
- Produced by: Georg Witt
- Starring: Ewald Balser; Lil Dagover; Viktor Staal
- Cinematography: Werner Krien
- Edited by: Elisabeth Kleinert-Neumann
- Music by: Werner Bochmann
- Production company: Georg Witt-Film
- Distributed by: UFA
- Release date: 16 May 1939
- Running time: 94 minutes
- Country: Germany
- Language: German

Detours to Happiness (German: Umwege zum Glück) is a 1939 German drama film directed by Fritz Peter Buch and starring Ewald Balser, Lil Dagover and Viktor Staal. It was shot at the Tempelhof Studios in Berlin and on location in Kitzbühel in the Tyrol in annexed Austria. The film's sets were designed by the art directors Wilhelm Depenau and Ludwig Reiber. It was distributed by UFA, Germany's largest film company of the era.

== Cast ==
- Ewald Balser as Thomas Bracht
- Lil Dagover as Hanna Bracht
- Eugen Klöpfer as Vater von Hanna
- Viktor Staal as Mathias Holberg
- Claire Winter as Marianne Schlüter
- Roma Bahn as Gast bei Brachts
- Elfe Gerhart as Jeanette Danieli
- Erich Dunskus as Viehhändler
- Walter Gross as Konzertgast
- Elisabeth Botz as Hannas Wirtschafterin
- Erich Ziegel as Dr. Wismar
- Franz Stein as Dr. Lehmann
- Oscar Sabo as Fröbe
- Hans Brausewetter as Burmann
- Vera Complojer as Frau Börnham
- Herbert Weissbach as Gast bei Bracht
- Franz Weber as Diener von Bracht
- Albert Venohr as Chauffeur von Bracht
- Carl Heinz Peters as Gast bei Brachts
- Walter Ladengast as Komponist
- Araca Makarova as Tänzerin

== Bibliography ==
- Klaus, Ulrich J. Deutsche Tonfilme: Jahrgang 1939. Klaus-Archiv, 1988.
- Niven, Bill, Hitler and Film: The Führer's Hidden Passion. Yale University Press, 2018.
- Rentschler, Eric. The Ministry of Illusion: Nazi Cinema and Its Afterlife. Harvard University Press, 1996.
