= Reichsfilmdramaturg =

Reichsfilmdramaturg (the Reich's dramatic adviser for films) was attached to the Ministry of Public Enlightenment and Propaganda. His task was to pre-check all planned film productions.

Contrary to the Film Review Office, which censored films already produced, the Reichsfilmdramaturg should prevent that inappropriate films being produced. It was therefore only possible to start the shooting of a film after the film's plot, manuscript and screenplay were approved by him.

The film industry was o.k. with the pre-check, as it prevented commercial damages through later censorship. The pre-check also allowed to get a cheap credit from the Filmkreditbank. This bank was set up to help financing films.

The following persons were Reichsfilmdramaturg:

- Willi Krause (known as Peter Hagen as writer), since February 1934
- Hans-Jürgen Nierentz (1936–37)
- Fritz Hippler
- Kurt Frowein
- Ewald von Demandowsky
