= The Golden Bullet (1921 film) =

1921 film

- Directed by: Robert Wullner
- Written by: Otto Treptow
- Starring: Gertrude Welcker; Erich Kaiser-Titz; Otto Treptow; Paul Richter
- Cinematography: Werner Brandes
- Production company: May-Film
- Release date: 24 March 1921
- Country: Germany
- Languages: Silent; German intertitles

The Golden Bullet (German: Die goldene Kugel) is a 1921 German silent adventure film directed by Robert Wuellner and starring Gertrude Welcker, Erich Kaiser-Titz and Otto Treptow. It premiered in Berlin on 24 March 1921.

== Cast ==
- Gertrude Welcker as die Frau
- Erich Kaiser-Titz as Der Graf
- Otto Treptow as Der Detektiv
- Paul Richter
- Max Adalbert
- Ernst Behmer
- Albert Patry

== Bibliography ==
- Grange, William. Cultural Chronicle of the Weimar Republic. Scarecrow Press, 2008.
