= Zombor, Veľký Krtíš District =

Zombor Zobor
- Municipality
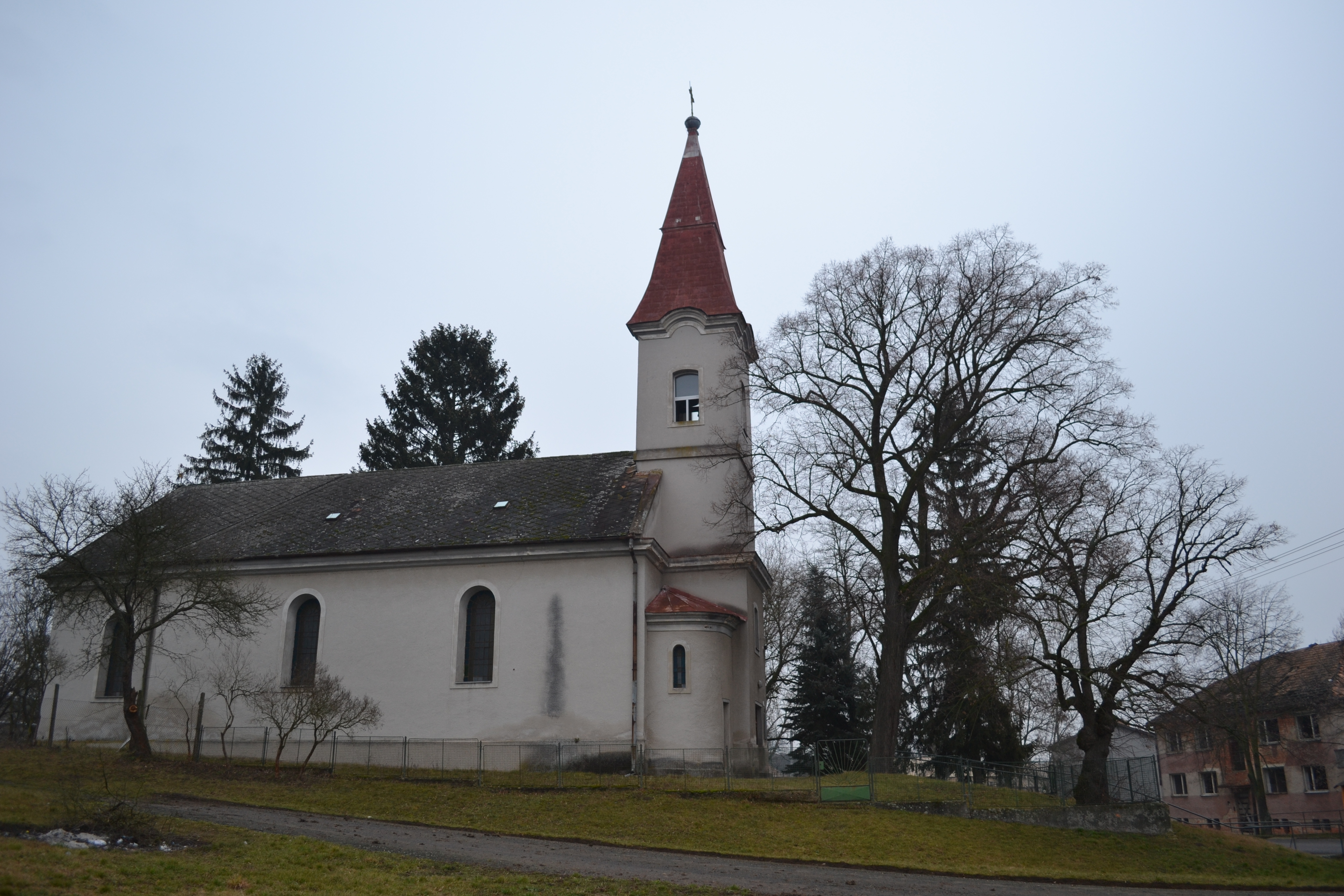

- Flag

- Location of Zombor in the Banská Bystrica Region Location of Zombor in Slovakia
- Coordinates: 48.13°N 19.45°E
- Country: Slovakia
- Region: Banská Bystrica Region
- District: Veľký Krtíš District
- First mentioned: 1327

Area
  - Total: 3.29 km^{2} (1.27 sq mi)
- Elevation: 181 m (594 ft)

Population (2025)
  - Total: 143
- Time zone: UTC+1 (CET)
  - Summer (DST): UTC+2 (CEST)
- Postal code: 991 22
- Area code: +421 47
- Vehicle registration plate (until 2022): VK
- Website: www.obec-zombor.sk

Zombor (Hungarian: Zobor) is a village and municipality in the Veľký Krtíš District of the Banská Bystrica Region of southern Slovakia.

== Population ==
Population statistic (10 years)
Year	1995	2005	2015	2025
Count	91	109	147	143
Difference		+19.78%	+34.86%	−2.72%

Population statistic
Year	2024	2025
Count	144	143
Difference		−0.69%

It has a population of 143 people (31 December 2025).

=== Ethnicity ===
Census 2021 (1+ %)
Ethnicity	Number	Fraction
Slovak	145	97.97%
Czech	2	1.35%
Not found out	2	1.35%
Total	148	

In year 2021 was 148 people by ethnicity 145 as Slovak, 2 as Czech, 2 as Not found out and 1 as Hungarian.

Note on population: The difference values of population numbers in the table "Population statistic" and in the sections "Ethnicity" & "Religion" is caused by the use of various statistical methods.

=== Religion ===
Census 2021 (1+ %)
Religion	Number	Fraction
Roman Catholic Church	84	56.76%
Evangelical Church	31	20.95%
None	20	13.51%
Not found out	12	8.11%
Total	148	

In year 2021 was 148 people by religion 84 from Roman Catholic Church, 31 from Evangelical Church, 20 from None, 12 from Not found out and 1 from Apostolic Church.
