= The Star of Rio =

The Star of Rio (German:Stern von Rio) may refer to:

- The Star of Rio (1940 film), a German film
- The Star of Rio (1955 film), a German-Italian remake
