= Margaret of Cortona =

Italian Franciscan tertiary and mystic, declared a saint

Saint Margaret of Cortona O.F.S.
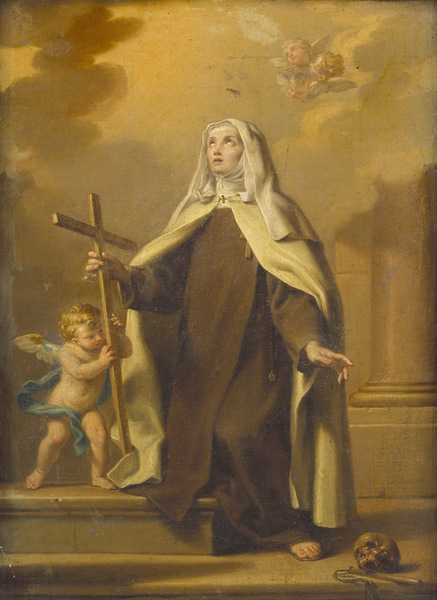

Tender of Sick, Monastic
- Born: c. 1247; Laviano, Italy
- Died: 22 February 1297 (aged 49–50); Cortona, Italy
- Venerated in: Catholic Church, Episcopal Church (United States)
- Canonized: 16 May 1728 by Pope Benedict XIII
- Feast: 22 February, 16 May
- Patronage: reformed prostitutes; people battling temptation, especially sexual; falsely-accused people; homeless people; insanity; orphans; mental illness; mentally-ill people; midwives; single mothers; people whose piety is ridiculed; single laywomen; third-born children

Margaret of Cortona (1247 – 22 February 1297) was an Italian penitent of the Third Order of Saint Francis. She was born in Laviano, near Perugia, and died in Cortona. She was canonised in 1728.

She is the patroness saint of reformed prostitutes; the falsely accused, hoboes, homeless, insane, orphaned, mentally ill, midwives, penitents, single mothers, stepchildren, and tramps.

== Life ==
Margaret was born of farming parents in Laviano, a small village nestled in the rolling hills of Castiglione del Lago, in the diocese of Chiusi, and about halfway between Montepulciano and Cortona. When she was seven, Margaret's mother died and her father remarried. Margaret and her stepmother grew to dislike each other. As she grew older, Margaret became more wilful and reckless, and her reputation in the village suffered. At age 17 she was seduced by a young knight and ran away with him. According to some accounts, he was the son of Gugliemo di Pecora, lord of Valiano, 16 km away (10 mi), not far from Montepulciano. Soon Margaret found herself installed in the castle (integral to the present town), not as wife but as mistress; less defiant of convention. She lived with him for nine years, bearing him a son.

One day, when the young gentleman failed to return home from visiting one of his estates, Margaret became concerned. More alarming was the arrival at the castle of his favourite hound. It led her into the forest to his murdered body. Shaken by this crime, Margaret took to prayer and penance. Giving up all her worldly goods, restoring that due to the knight's family, she left his home. Arrived at her father's house with the boy, she begged forgiveness. However, at her stepmother's insistence, he would not have her. Margaret sought help from Franciscan friars at Cortona, 20 km away (12 mi). Shelter for them both was found in the home of two ladies, Marinana and Raneria. Her son went to school in Arezzo. In due course, he was himself to become a Franciscan friar.

There followed a vivid public penitence from Margaret. Horrified by her former life, she undertook extraordinary mortifications, including prolonged self-starvation, or "holy anorexia", and self-mutilation. Once, averted by her confessor, she wanted to disfigure her face with a razor, to make herself unattractive.

A cottage was found for Margaret, where she lived with her son. Early on, she was able to make ends meet in Cortona by caring for children and nursing unwell ladies. It then became serving the needs of the poor, especially the sick, that occupied her time, alongside devoting herself to prayer. Animated by the example of Francis of Assisi, her hope was to take the habit of a mendicant friar.

In 1277, after three years' probation, Margaret was at last received into the Third Order of Saint Francis. with her focus on prayer and contemplation, she became drawn into a close mystical communion with Christ. She continued to serve the poor.

Margaret established a hospital for the sick, homeless and impoverished. To attract nurses for the hospital, and to help look after those imprisoned, she instituted a congregation of Tertiary Sisters, known as Le poverelle (Little poor ones in Italian). She was to report that, while in prayer, she heard the words, "What is your wish, poverella?" (little poor one). She had replied, "I neither seek nor wish for anything but You, my Lord Jesus." She went on to establish a confraternity devoted to Our Lady of Mercy, members binding themselves to support the hospital financially and to help the needy. She offered counsel to penitents who began to seek her out as fame for her sanctity spread.

One gathers Margaret took to sleeping on a wooden trellis in a cell at the Church of St. Francis; then, as now, under the custodial care of the local Franciscan friary. Once, on a Sunday morning, she reappeared at the Eucharist at Laviano's church, whereupon she made a public confession with a full account of her past, and begged pardon from the community of her childhood.

On several occasions, Margaret got embroiled in matters rather more political. It seems that in 1288 she was asked to seek reconciliation between local families split bitterly by the second phase (1216–1392) of the Guelph/Ghibelline rift. She was asked also to negotiate between the people of Cortona and the Bishop of Arezzo, Guglielmino degli Ubertini, in whose diocese Cortona then lay. Claiming divine command, she twice challenged him publicly because of his lifestyle, mostly conducting war, as if he were not a cleric but a prince in the secular world.

By 1288, Margaret had retreated to contemplation among the ruins of a small oratory dedicated to St. Basil. Apart from the visits of her priest, she remained there alone. The little church itself had been damaged during the 1258 siege of the town by soldiers from Arezzo. Margaret led efforts to rebuild the church and adjacent monastery. In those days a mere 15 metres in length, the church was dedicated to Saints Basil, Giles, and Catherine of Alexandria. In a wall of the small adjacent chapel of St. Basil was laid her body when she died on 22 February 1297, not yet 50 years old. She was acclaimed immediately as a saint, though official canonisation was to wait more than 430 years.

By 1330, from a design by Giovanni Pisano, Cortona's citizens had constructed a larger basilica, Santa Margerita, as seen today. The old church was now subsumed into the nave of the newer, 30 metre long, structure. Located roughly at the 3rd altar to the left of the nave is the spot where Margaret had died; a room behind the old church where she had dwelt for the last years of her life.

1456 saw the exhumation of Margaret's body, thenceforward housed in the basilica, where it became the object of veneration. Her body had been declared incorrupt. To this day, it remains preserved in a silver casket. When exhumed, it was discovered that her body was embalmed artificially as there were cuts on the cadaver, and other jars of preserved organs. There were records that were discovered that the people at the time had requested the church embalm the body. However, this information had be lost over time, and after many centuries the people began to declare it miraculous.

Margaret was canonised by Pope Benedict XIII on 16 May 1728. Her feast day in the Catholic Church is 22 February, when she is honoured also with a Lesser Feast on the liturgical calendar of the Episcopal Church in America.

== In art ==
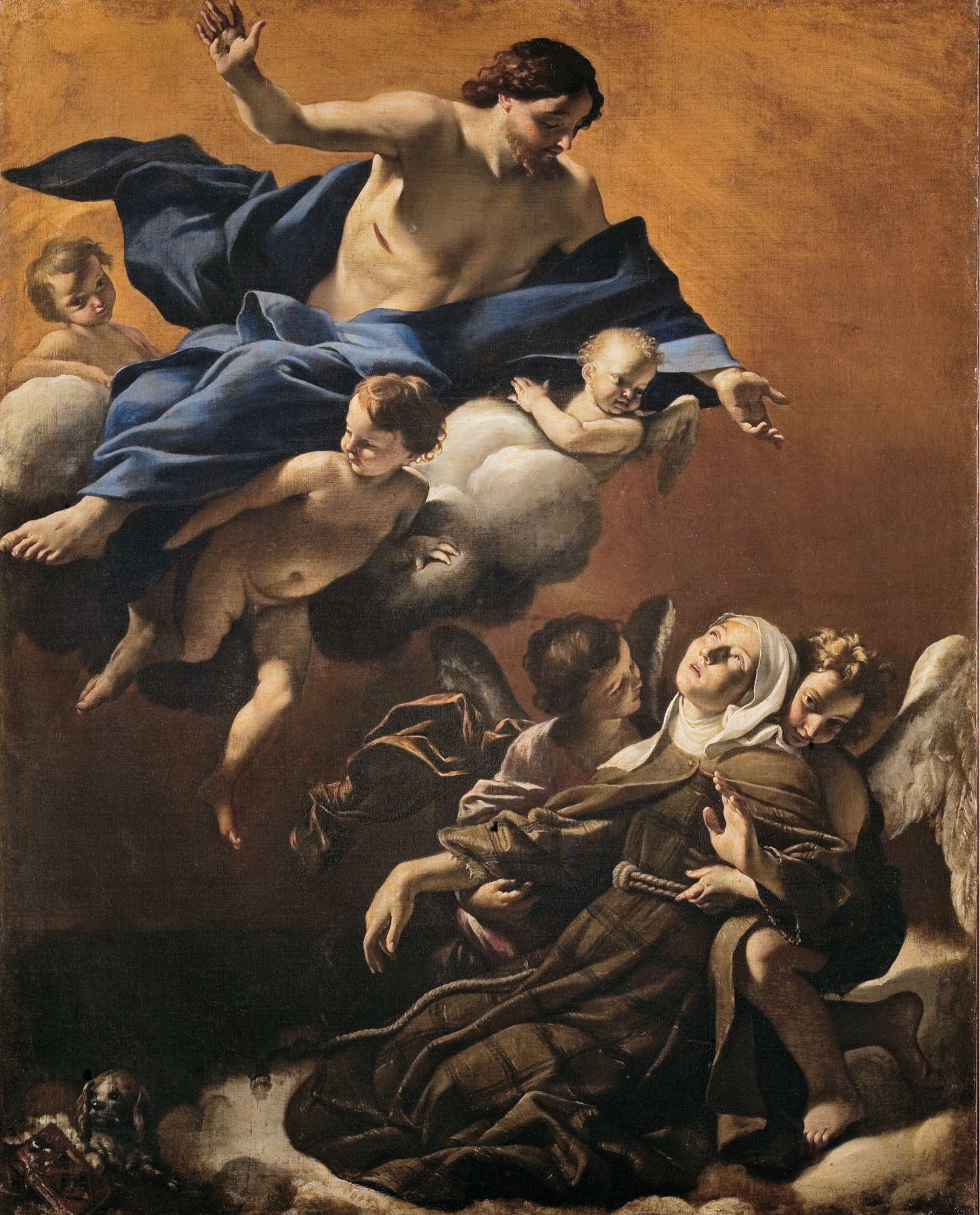
The Ecstasy of St Margaret of Cortona by Giovanni Lanfranco, 1622 (Palazzo Pitti)

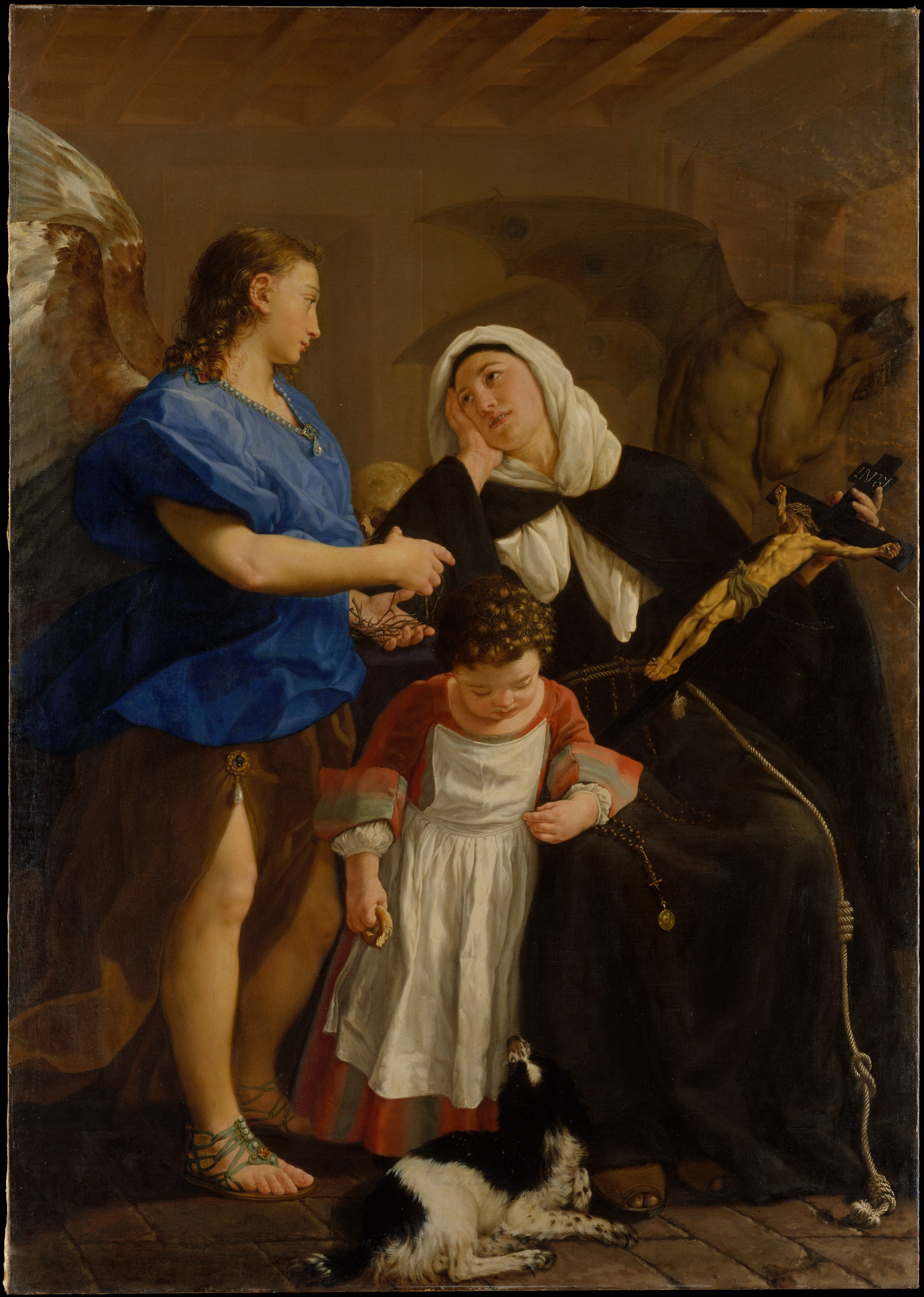
St Margaret of Cortona (1758)

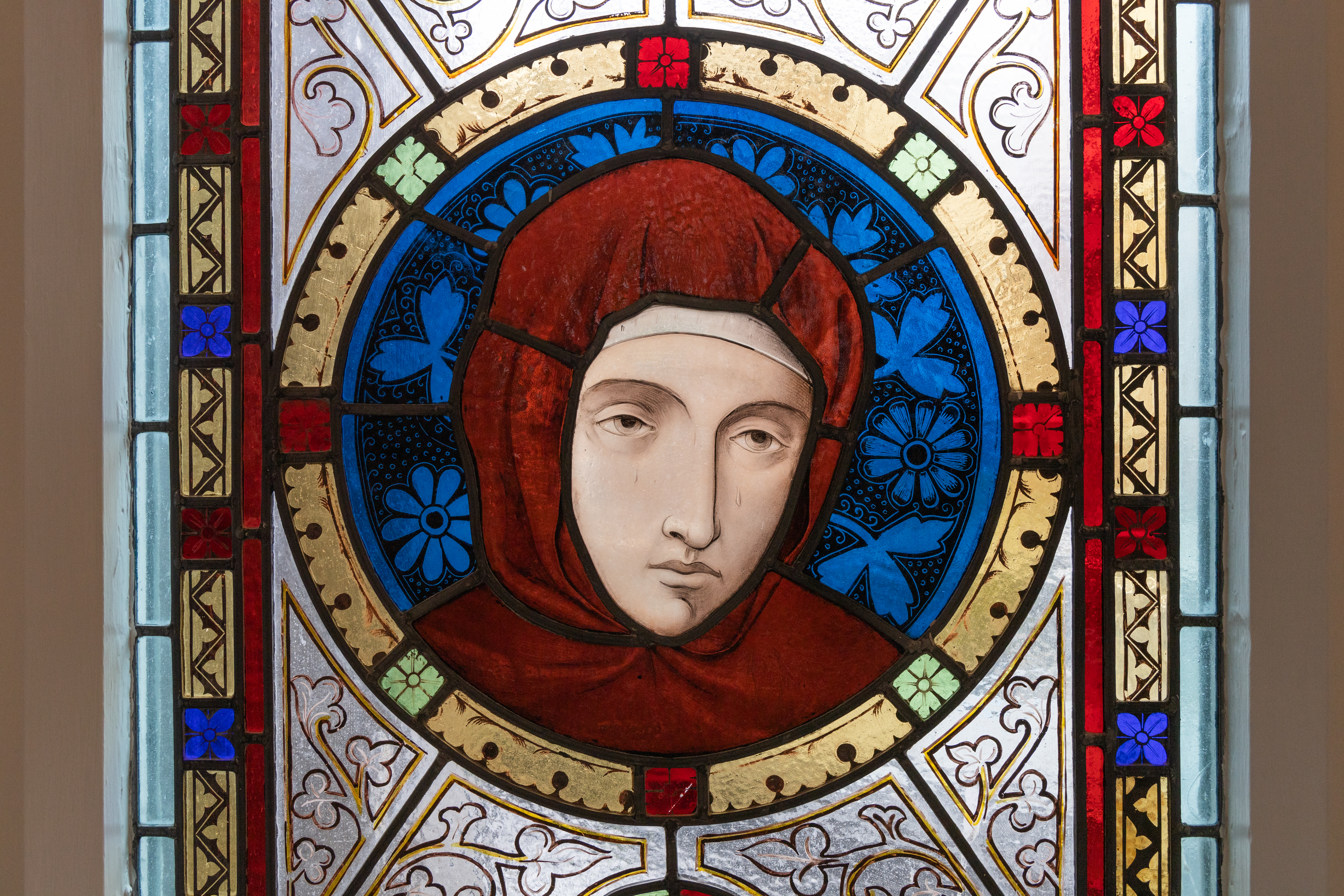
In stained glass at the Highlanes Gallery, Ireland, formerly a Franciscan monastery

Often evident in illustrations of Margaret's life is a dog, her guide in the story of her encountering the body of her son's murdered father.

Paintings depicting Margaret have been completed by Giovanni Lanfranco (1622) and Gaspare Traversi (c. 1758).

In 1901, a short story by Edith Wharton was published by Harper’s Magazine about Margaret of Cortona’s possible deathbed reflections of her life.

In 1938, the Italian composer Licinio Refice wrote his second opera, Margherita da Cortona based on the life of the Margaret, with libretto by Emidio Mucci.

A 1950 biographical film, Margaret of Cortona, by Mario Bonnard featured Maria Frau as Margaret.

== See also ==
- List of Catholic saints
- Saint Margaret of Cortona, patron saint archive
- St. Margaret of Cortona's Church (Bronx)
