= Persecution of black people in Nazi Germany =

While black people in Nazi Germany were never subject to an organized mass extermination program, as in the cases of Jews, homosexuals, Romani, and Slavs, they were still considered by the Nazis to be a "non-Aryan" and inferior race. Racially discriminatory policies, such as the Nuremberg Laws, were enforced against black people under supplementary decrees detailing that such laws not only applied to Jewish people, but also other certain ethnic minorities. Due to the Nazi Party's rhetoric and racial laws regarding black people, they experienced significant discrimination in civilian life. Under a Gestapo program, an estimated 500 Afro-Germans were sterilized, including children. Artistic creations by black people, such as jazz music, were subject to censorship in Nazi Germany.

== Background ==
Before the events of World War II, Germany struggled with the idea of African mixed-race German citizens. While interracial marriage was legal under German law at the time, beginning in 1890, some colonial officials started refusing to register them, using eugenics arguments about the supposed inferiority of mixed-race children to support their decision. By 1912, this had become official policy in many German colonies, and a debate in the Reichstag over the legality of the interracial marriage bans ensued. A major concern brought up in debate was that mixed-race children born in such marriages would have German citizenship, and could therefore return to Germany with the same rights to vote, serve in the military, and could also hold public office as full-blooded ethnic Germans.

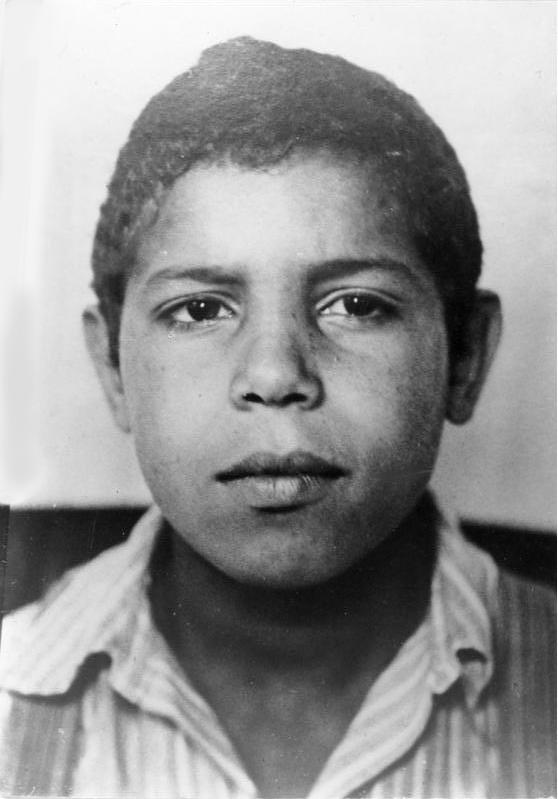
Young Rhinelander who was classified as a bastard and hereditarily unfit under the Nazi regime.

After World War I, French occupation forces in the Rhineland included black troops from France's colonies in Africa, some of whom fathered children with German women. Newspaper campaigns against the use of these troops focused on these children, dubbed "Rhineland bastards", often with lurid stories of uncivilized African soldiers raping innocent German women, the so-called "Black Horror on the Rhine". In the Rhineland itself, local opinion of the troops was very different, and the soldiers were described as "courteous and often popular", possibly because French colonial soldiers harbored less ill will towards Germans than war-weary ethnic French occupiers. While subsequent discussions of Afro-German children revolved around these "Rhineland Bastards", only 400–600 children were born to such unions, compared to a total Black population of 20,000–25,000 in Germany at the time.

In Mein Kampf, Adolf Hitler described children resulting from marriages to African occupation soldiers as a contamination of the white race "by negro blood on the Rhine in the heart of Europe." He thought that "Jews were responsible for bringing Negroes into the Rhineland, with the ultimate idea of bastardizing the White race which they hate and thus lowering its cultural and political level so that the Jew might dominate." He also implied that this was a plot on the part of the French since the population of France was being increasingly "negrified".

== Rhineland sterilization program ==
Race alone was not sufficient criteria for forced sterilization, under Third Reich eugenics laws. Anyone could request sterilization for themselves or a minor under their care. The cohort of mixed-race children born during the occupation were approaching adulthood when, in 1937, with Hitler's approval, a special Gestapo commission was created and charged with "the discrete sterilization of the Rhineland bastards." It is unclear how much these minors were told about the procedures, or how many parents only consented under pressure from the Gestapo. An estimated 500 children were sterilized under this program, including girls as young as eleven years old. The Third Reich viewed these children as a threat to racial purity and targeted them as part of a broader campaign of ethnic cleansing. Racial hygiene policies were designed to prevent future generations of Afro-Germans from being born, reflecting the regime's commitment to racial hierarchy. Beyond sterilization, Afro-Germans also faced imprisonment in workhouses, concentration camps, and psychiatric facilities.

== Civilian life ==
Beyond the compulsory sterilization program in the Rhineland, there was no coherent Nazi policy towards African Germans. In one instance, when local officials petitioned for guidance on how to handle an Afro-German who could not find employment and had become a repeat criminal offender, they were told the population was too small to warrant the formulation of any official policy and to settle the case as they saw fit. Due to the rhetoric at the time, Black Germans experienced discrimination in employment, welfare, and housing, and were also banned from pursuing higher education; they were socially isolated and forbidden to have sexual relations and marriages with Aryans by the racial laws. Jazz, considered "negro music", (negermusik) and an "inner crisis" to the white race by Nazi cultural theorists was also banned from the radio. Black people were placed at the bottom of the racial scale of non-Aryans along with Jews, Slavs, and Romani/Roma people. Some Black people managed to work as actors in films about the African colonies. Others were hired for the German Africa Show, a human zoo touring between 1937 and 1940.

== In the armed forces ==
The Compulsory Service Act of 21 May 1935 restricted military service to "Aryans" only, but there are several documented cases of Afro-Germans who served in the Wehrmacht, or were temporarily allowed into the Hitler Youth. In one case, an Afro-German man named Peter K. was forcibly sterilized before being drafted.

== Non-German prisoners of war ==
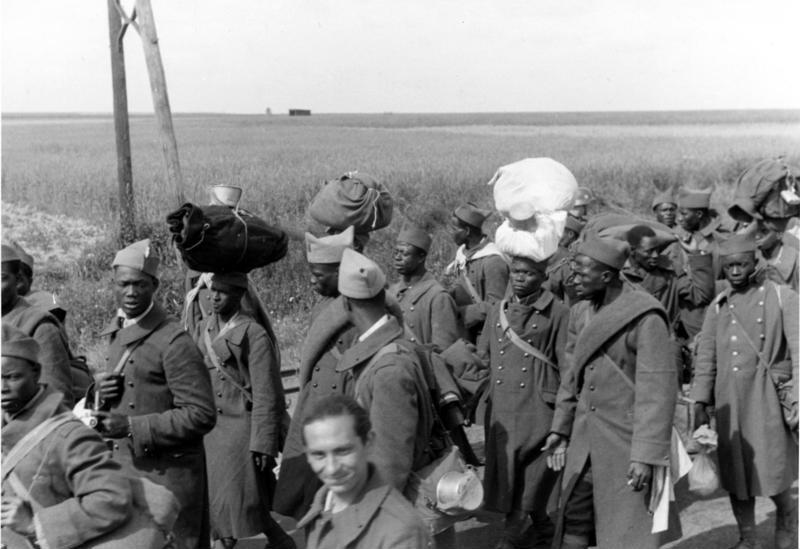
Black prisoners of war from French Africa, captured in 1940.

The French Army made extensive use of African soldiers during the Battle of France in May–June 1940 and 120,000 became prisoners of war. Most of them came from French West Africa and Madagascar. While no government orders were issued regarding black prisoners of war, some German commanders separated black people from captured French units for summary execution on their initiative. There are also documented cases of captured African American soldiers in the United States Army suffering the same fate.

In the absence of any official policy, the treatment of black prisoners of war varied widely, and most captured black soldiers were taken prisoner rather than executed. However, violence against black prisoners of war was also never prosecuted by Nazi authorities. In prisoner-of-war camps, black soldiers were kept segregated from white and generally experienced worse conditions than their white comrades. Their conditions deteriorated further in the last days of the war. Roughly half of the French colonial prisoners of war did not survive captivity. Groups such as North Africans were sometimes treated as black and sometimes as white.

== Stolpersteine for black victims of Nazi persecution ==
Four stolpersteine in Germany, three in Berlin and one in Frankfurt, commemorate black victims of Nazi persecution:

- Mahjub bin Adam Mohamed (Brunnenstrasse 193, Berlin) – born in 1904 in Dar es Salaam (then part of German East Africa), he served a child soldier in German colonial army during World War I and moved to Berlin in 1929. He worked as a Swahili teacher, hotel waiter, and film actor. He was sent to Sachsenhausen concentration camp in 1941 for "transgression of racial barriers" and died there on November 24, 1944.
- Ferdinand James Allen (Torstrasse 174, Berlin) – born in 1898 in Berlin to a Black British father of Afro-Caribbean origin and a German mother, he was sterilized in 1933 and involuntarily euthanized at Bernburg psychiatric hospital for having epilepsy under Aktion T4 on May 14, 1941.
- Hagar Martin Brown (Marburgerstrasse 9, Frankfurt) – born in 1889 in Cape Town (then part of Cape Colony), he was taken to Germany in 1910 to be a servant to an aristocratic family in Berlin and later worked as a chauffeur. Brown was married to a German woman and had two daughters. He was left paralyzed in 1939 after being beaten by police and used to test a medical chemical, dying as a result on June 3, 1940.
- Martha Ndumbe (Max-Beer Strasse 24, Berlin) – born in 1902 in Berlin to a Cameroonian father (then the colony of Kamerun) a German mother, she was forced to turn to prostitution and petty crimes to survive due to discrimination. She was sent to Ravensbrück concentration camp on June 9, 1944 for being an "asocial professional criminal" and died there on February 5, 1945. In October 2025, Martha-Ndumbe-Platz was also renamed after her.

== See also ==
- Morenazi
