= Santa Margherita, Chieri =

Church in Chieri, Italy

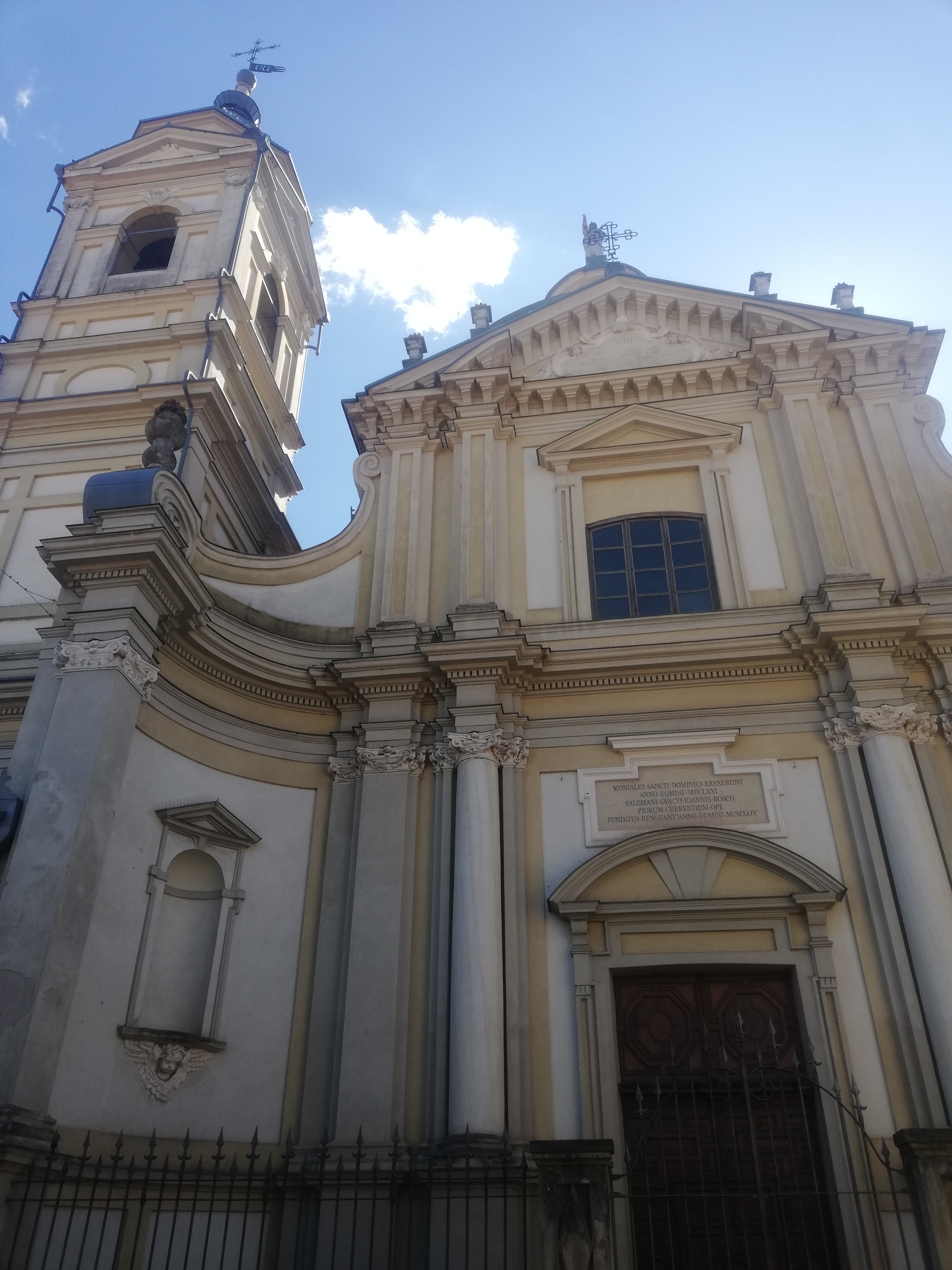
Santa Margherita, Chieri.jpg

Santa Margherita is a Baroque-style, Roman Catholic church and convent located on Vittorio Emanuele #80 in the town of Chieri, Province of Turin, region of Piedmont, Italy.

== History ==
The church was rebuilt in 1671 by the Dominican friars living in the monastery that was once adjacent.

The ceiling is frescoed with a Glory of the Corpus Domini with Saints and Bishops. The stucco decoration was completed by Giovanni Battista Barberini (1666). The statues in the pilasters depict David, Solomon, Judith, and Esther. The wooden altar includes a canvas depicting Coronation of the Virgin by the Holy Trinity with Saints Dominic and Margaret of Cortona painted by Guglielmo Caccia. The wooden choir stalls were transferred here from the former church of San Bernardino of Siena in town.

The St Margaret church is now ministered by the Salesian Order, who run an oratory and school. The church also has paintings by Mario Caffaro Rore. The Chapel of the Immacolata to the left of the entrance has a statue by Ignazio Perucca.
