= Santa Margherita, Cortona =

Basilica in Cortona, Italy

Coordinates: 43.2765°N 11.9924°E

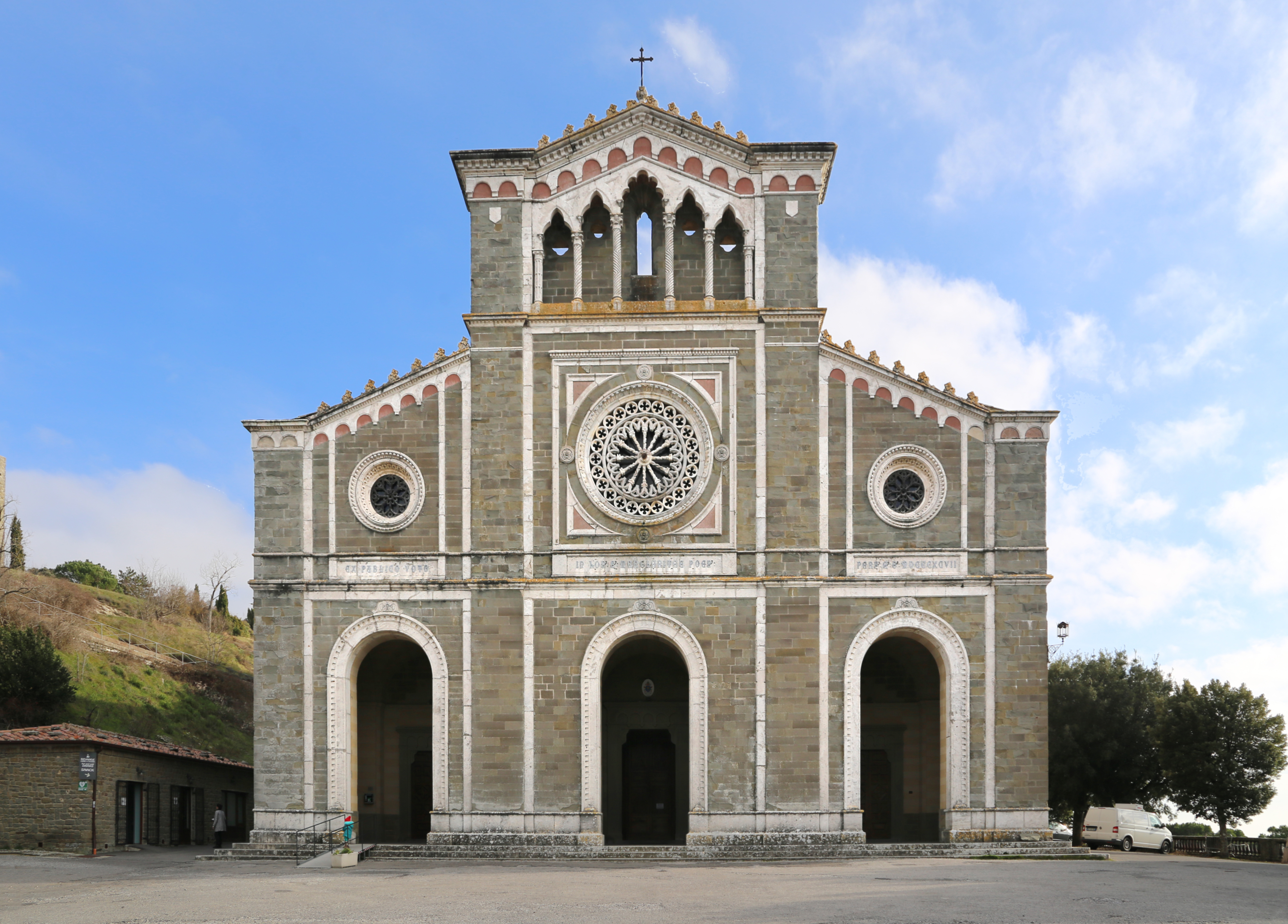
Facade of the Basilica

Basilica of Santa Margherita is a neo-Gothic style, Roman Catholic church, located just outside the Tuscan town of Cortona, Italy, at the intersection of Via delle Santucce and Via Sant Margherita, on a hill just below the Fortezza Medicea, and dedicated to a native saint of the town, Margaret of Cortona.

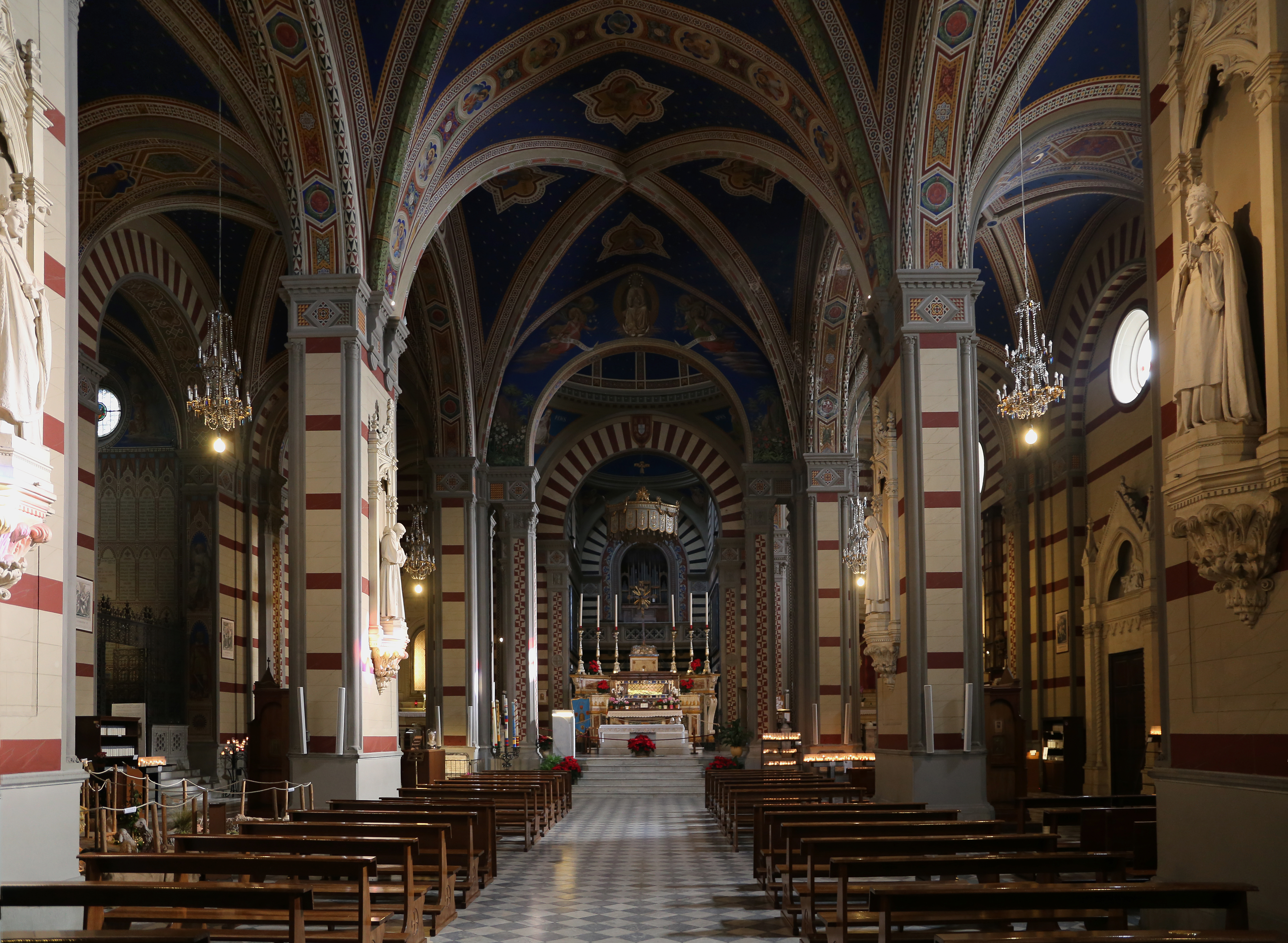
Interior of the church

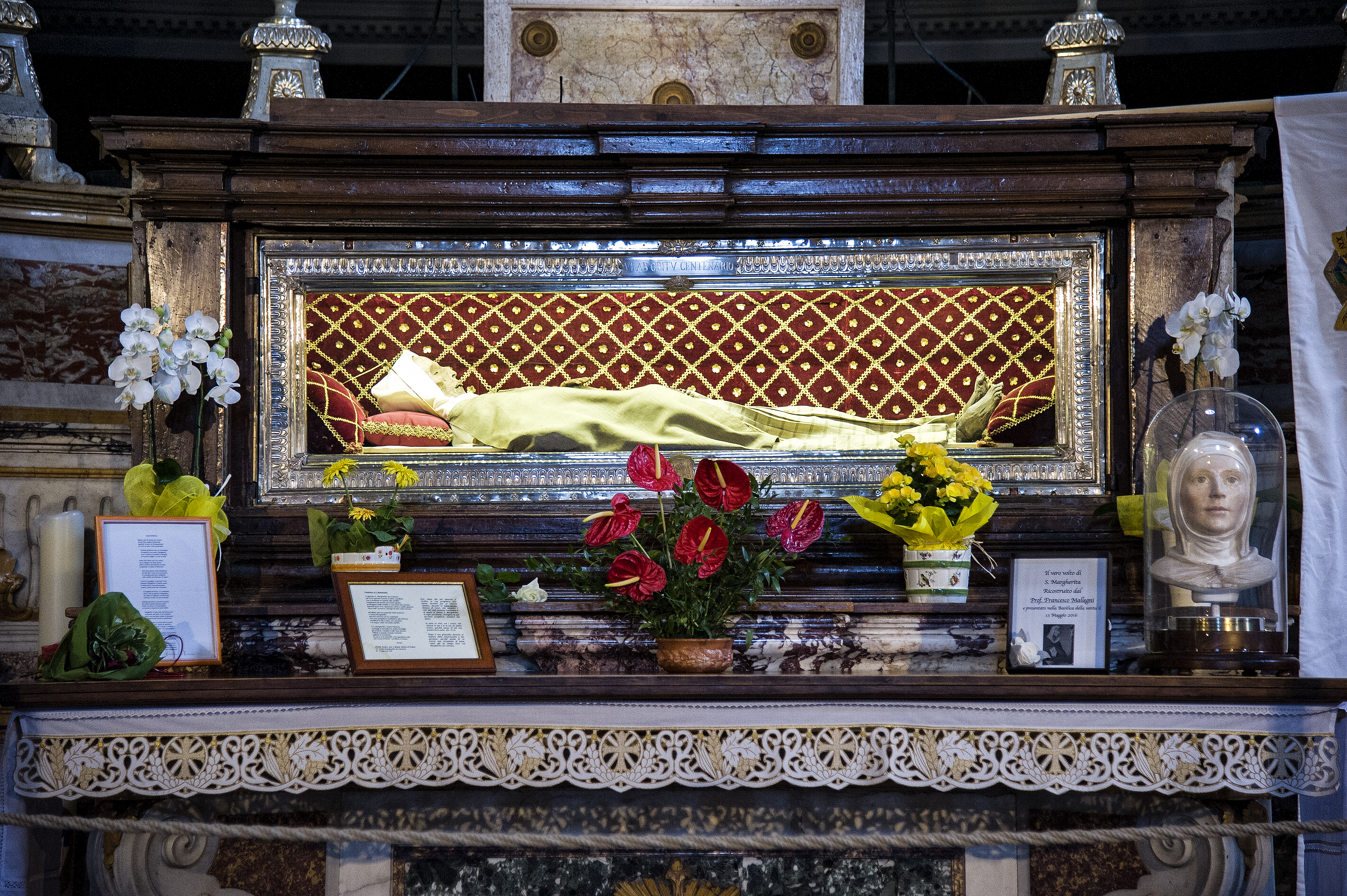
Relics of Saint Margaret

== History ==
The church was originally the site of a small oratory dedicated to San Basilio, and built by Camaldolese monks in the 11th century. Damaged during the 1258 siege of the town by Arezzo, the church and adjacent convent were rebuilt in 1288 by efforts led by Margherita di Cortona, herself a Franciscan tertiary, and dedicated to Saints Basil, Egidius, and Catherine of Alexandria. In those days it was still merely an oratory, and was only 15 metres in length. It was sited adjacent to a small chapel dedicated to St Basil. Margaret died in 1297 in a room behind the old church where she had lived the last years of her life. This room corresponds roughly to the present site of the 3rd altar to the left of the nave. She was buried in a wall of the chapel of St Basil. By 1330, the Cortonese had constructed a larger church designed by Giovanni Pisano, in part to house her relics, exhumed in 1456, that had become an object of veneration. The old church now became part of the nave of the newer, 30 metre long, structure. The saint was canonised in 1728.

Fragments of a fresco from the church, attributed to Pietro Lorenzetti, are now conserved in the Diocesan Museum. Other 14th-century frescoes such as ones by Barna da Siena have disappeared. Many of the canvases once in the interior have been dispersed or moved.

The church underwent major enlargements and reconstructions in 1738 and in 1874-1878; only the choir and two vaults, the second and third of the central nave, remain from the original church. The present Gothic Revival architecture style church is the work of Enrico Presenti and Mariano Falcini. The facade was designed by Domenico Mirri (1856-1939), and completed by Giuseppe Castellucci.

The rich marble mausoleum on the left of the transept by the Sienese workshops and the saint's silver casket (1774) at the main altar, displaying her incorrupt body, was designed by Pietro Berrettini. The main altarpiece once held a large Deposition by Luca Signorelli, now in the Diocesane museum. The marble statue (1781) of the saint in a niche on the right was sculpted by Vincenzo Pacetti.

The second altar on the right has an altarpiece depicting Virgin and St Elizabeth of Hungary, by Jacopo da Empoli. On an altar on the right there is a 13th-century wooden crucifix, originally from the church of San Francesco, Cortona. It is said St Margaret prayed before this crucifix. On the right side walls there are relics and captured standards donated by the Knights of Malta stationed in Cortona. On the left nave we see a large chapel in memory of those Cortonese fallen during the war, with frescos by Osvaldo Bignami. The first altar on the left had an altarpiece depicting Saints Louis of Toulouse, Francis, Dominic, and Margaret by Francesco Vanni. the second altar had a painting depicting the Massacre of the Innocents by Pietro Giannotti.

The church was elevated to the status of a minor basilica in 1927. Behind the church is the bell-tower (1650) and a monastery of the Franciscan Order.
