= St Margaret of Cortona (Gaspare Traversi) =

Painting by Gaspare Traversi

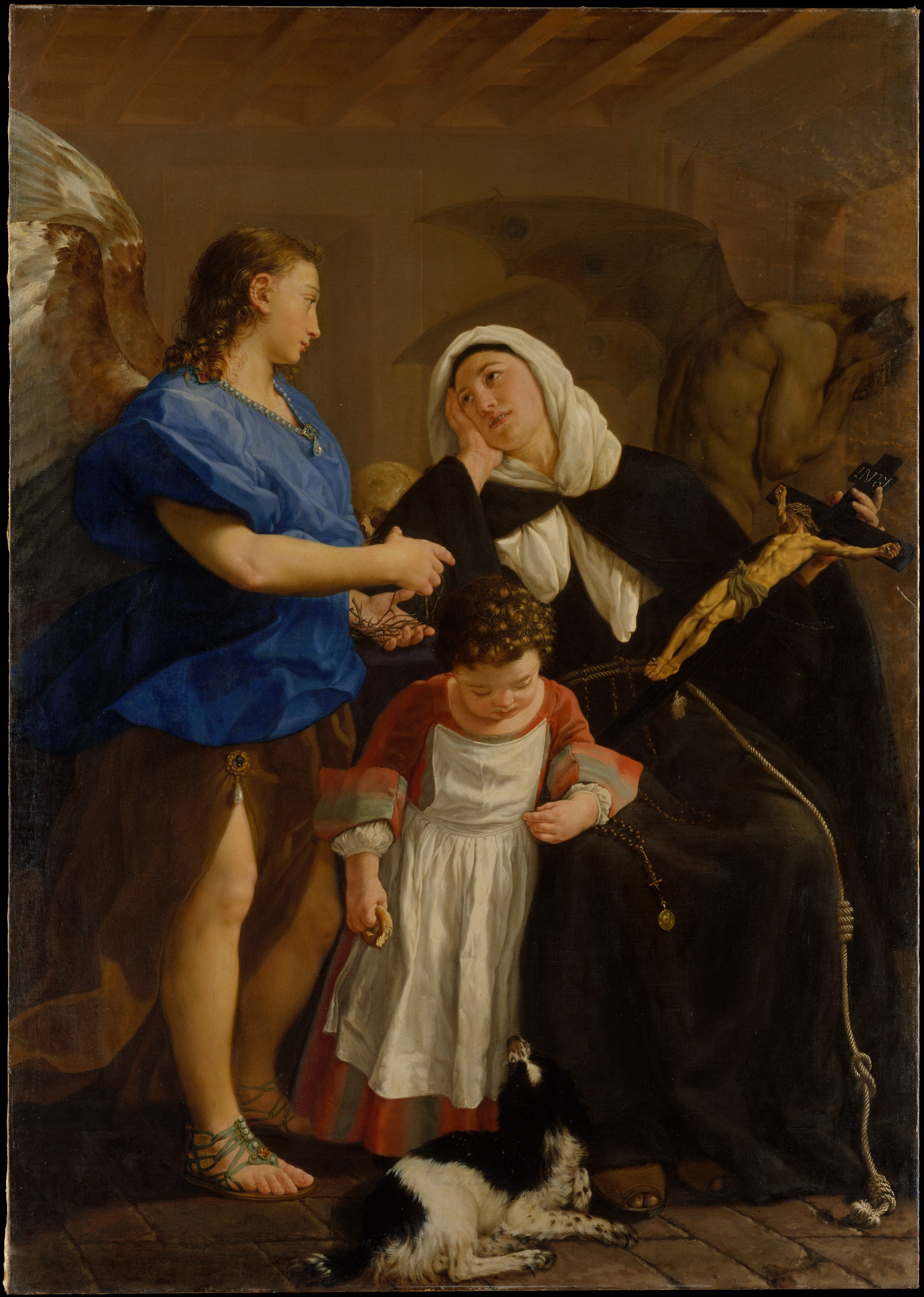
- Artist: Gaspare Traversi
- Medium: Oil on canvas
- Dimensions: 172 cm × 48.5 cm (68 in × 19.1 in)
- Location: Metropolitan; New York City

St Margaret of Cortona is a circa 1758 painting by the Italian late-Baroque painter Gaspare Traversi. This artist, active in Naples Italy, is best known for his sometimes humorous and intricate genre works.

== Description ==
The painting depicts is a blunt allegory showing Margaret of Cortona, the 13th-century Franciscan tertiary, as underscored by the knotted belt of rope or cincture of the order. Margaret sits in a plain room, listening entranced to the words of an angel, whose hands finger a crown of thorns and partially obscure a skull; in her left hand, she cradles a crucifix. In the background, a bat-winged satanic figure departs, with his hands hiding his face. His wings have cryptic circles. St Margaret in her writings recalled that she served as a mistress and step-mother to an aristocratic noble. But he was murdered, and her dog was able to lead her to his corpse. These events triggered her departure from a sinful life in the world to a eremitic live of devotion.

The arc of her life would have held resonance for women seeking absolution in joining the tertiaries, which did not require vows of absolute poverty and chastity. The veneration of Saint Margaret of Cortona was prominent in her native Tuscany, but did spread through Italy.
