= The Double Fiance =

1934 film

- Directed by: Martin Frič
- Written by: Martin Frič; Hugo Haas; Hans Fritz Köllner
- Starring: Fritz Kampers
- Cinematography: Václav Vích
- Music by: Erich Einegg
- Production companies: Itala-Film; Moldavia-film
- Release date: 22 June 1934
- Running time: 84 minutes
- Countries: Czechoslovakia; German Reich
- Language: German

The Double Fiancé (German: Der Doppelbräutigam) is a 1934 Czechoslovak-German comedy film directed by Martin Frič. It is a German-language version of the Czech film Life Is a Dog, shot at the same time with a German-speaking cast by the same director.

== Synopsis ==
Composer Viktor Lange gets a job at a music publishing house by posing as his own uncle, Professor Alfred Ritter. A series of events lead to him becoming engaged to both the owner's daughters.

== Cast ==
- Fritz Kampers as Composer Viktor Lange / Professor Alfred Ritter, his uncle
- Jakob Tiedtke as Roland, Music publisher
- Lien Deyers as Eva, Roland's daughter
- Carsta Löck as Helene, Roland's daughter
- Werner Jantsch as Morrison
- Alois Dvorský as Landlord
- Jára Kohout as Customer

== See also ==
- Life Is a Dog (1933)
