= Karel Štěpánek =

Czech actor (1899–1980)

- Štěpánek in Secret Mission (1942)
- Born: 29 October 1899; Brno, Margraviate of Moravia, Austria-Hungary (now Czech Republic)
- Died: 25 December 1980 (aged 81); London, England
- Other name: Karel Stepanek
- Occupations: Actor, singer
- Years active: 1920–1971
- Spouse: Marianne Deeming

Karel Štěpánek (29 October 1899 – 25 December 1980), sometimes credited as Karl Stepanek, was a Czech actor and singer. He spent many years in Austria and Germany, and generally played German-speaking roles onscreen. In 1939 he moved to the United Kingdom as a refugee from Nazism, and spent much of the rest of his career there.

== Life and career ==
Štěpánek was born in Brno (in present-day Czech Republic), then a part of Austria-Hungary, to František Štěpánek and Marie Dworzak. After training in acting and classical singing, he began his stage career there in 1920. A year later he moved to Vienna, where he worked at the Raimund Theater and Graz Opera.

In 1927, he moved to Berlin, working in theatre, opera, and cabaret. He made his film debut in 1928's silent romance A Love, A Thief, A Department Store, and in 1931 appeared in his first sound film. He appeared in a number of German films during the decade, typically in supporting roles, where he was typically billed as Karl Stepanek ('Karl' is the German form of the Czech 'Karel').

In 1939, shortly before the outbreak of World War II, Štěpánek emigrated to Great Britain as a refugee from Nazi Germany. He was employed the BBC's overseas section, writing and recording propaganda broadcasts in German and Czech, and acted on the West End. Beginning with 1942's Secret Mission, Štěpánek found a successful second career playing villainous Nazis in war films, joining a community of other German-speaking emigre actors like Conrad Veidt and Herbert Lom.

After the war, Štěpánek elected to remain in the UK and went on to appear in dozens of film and television roles, usually as a villain or other malefactor. He did make some appearances in West German films and TV during the 1960s. In 1951, he played the lead role of Napoleon in a West End run of George Bernard Shaw's The Man of Destiny.

== Personal life ==
Štěpánek was married to Hungarian-born actress Marianne Deeming (1899–1984).

=== Death ===
Štěpánek died in London in 1980, at the age of 81. He was buried at North Sheen Cemetery in Kew.

== Partial filmography ==
- A Love, A Thief, A Department Store (1928)
- Berlin-Alexanderplatz (1931)
- Here's Berlin (1932) as Max
- Five from the Jazz Band (1932) as Jean
- Spies at the Savoy Hotel (1932) as Jackson
- A Song for You (1933) as Theo Bruckner
- Waltz War (1933) as Kellner Leopold
- Hermine and the Seven Upright Men (1935) as Ruckstuhl, Grundstückspekulant
- Die Werft zum grauen Hecht (1935) as Ladewig
- Der Auβenseiter (1935) as Otto Burian
- Stronger Than Regulations (1936) as Robert Wendland
- The Unknown (1936) as Manager at Regina's
- Signal in the Night (1937) as Korporal Tschepski
- Die Fledermaus (1937) as Attaché / Orlovsky
- Klatovští dragouni (1937) as Dance Master
- The Stars Shine (1938) as Oberbeleuchter Brandt
- Fools in the Snow (1938) as Rolf Pinkenkötter
- War es der im 3. Stock? (1939) as Georg Kilby
- Das Abenteuer geht weiter (1939) as Lawyer
- Hotel Sacher (1939) as Franz
- Three Fathers for Anna (1939)
- The Leghorn Hat (1939) as Felix
- Die Kluge Schwiegermutter (1939) as Hans Giebel
- Drei Väter un Anna (1939) as Matschek
- Alles Schwindel (1940) as Clubdiener
- Women Are Better Diplomats (1941) as Kellner
- Secret Mission (1942) as Major Lang
- Tomorrow We Live (1943) as Seitz
- Escape to Danger (1943) as Franz von Brinkman
- They Met in the Dark (1943) as Riccardo
- The Captive Heart (1946) as Forster
- Counterblast (1948) as Professor Inman, Nazi Psychiatrist
- Broken Journey (1948) as Swiss Officer (uncredited)
- The Fallen Idol (1948) as First Secretary
- Conspirator (1949) as Radek
- The Third Man (1949) as Actor at Josefstadt Theatre (uncredited)
- Give Us This Day (1949) as Jaroslav
- Golden Arrow (1949) as Schroeder
- Cairo Road (1950) as Edouardo Pavlis
- State Secret (1950) as Dr. Revo
- The Third Visitor (1951) as Richard Carling
- No Highway (1951) as Mannheim (uncredited)
- Walk East on Beacon (1952) as Alexi Laschenkov / Gregory Anders
- Affair in Trinidad (1952) as Walters
- City Beneath the Sea (1953) as Dwight Trevor
- Never Let Me Go (1953) as Commisar
- Rough Shoot (1953) as Diss
- Dangerous Cargo (1954) as Pliny
- Tale of Three Women (1954) as Alfred Dykemann (segment "Final Twist' story)
- A Prize of Gold (1955) as Zachmann
- Secret Venture (1955) as Zelinsky
- The Cockleshell Heroes (1955) as Assistant Gestapo Officer
- Man of the Moment (1955) as Lom
- Private's Progress (1956) as German Officer (uncredited)
- The Man in the Road (1956) as Dmitri Balinkev
- Anastasia (1956) as Mikhail Vlados
- The Traitor (1957) as Friederich Suderman
- West of Suez (1957) as Langford
- Operation Amsterdam (1959) as Diamond Merchant (uncredited)
- Our Man in Havana (1959) as Dr. Braun
- Sink the Bismarck! (1960) as Admiral Günther Lütjens
- I Aim at the Stars (1960) as Captain Dornberger
- Three Moves to Freedom (1960) as Baranow
- Terror After Midnight (1962) as Vater Stoddard
- Devil Doll (1964) as Dr. Heller
- Operation Crossbow (1965) as Prof. Hoffer
- Licensed to Kill (1965) as Henrik Jacobsen
- The Heroes of Telemark (1965) as Prof. Hartmuller
- Sperrbezirk (1966) as Inspector Wagner
- The Frozen Dead (1967) as General Lubeck
- Murderers Club of Brooklyn (1967) as Dyers
- Before Winter Comes (1969) as Count Kerassy
- The File of the Golden Goose (1969) as Mueller
- The Games (1970) as Kubitsek
- Been Down So Long It Looks Like Up to Me (1971) as Count Derassy (final film role)
