= Hans Fritz Köllner =

German screenwriter

- Born: 23 May 1896; Dresden, Saxony, German Empire
- Died: 12 December 1976 (aged 80); West Berlin, West Germany
- Occupations: Writer, Director
- Years active: 1927-1965 (film)

Hans Fritz Köllner (23 May 1896 – 12 December 1976) was a German screenwriter. He also directed the 1946 film Allez Hopp.

== Selected filmography ==
- A Love, A Thief, A Department Store (1928)
- Cavaliers of the Kurfürstendamm (1932)
- The Song of the Sun (1933)
- The Double Fiance (1934)
- A Hoax (1936)
- The Empress's Favourite (1936)
- The Star of Rio (1940)
- Front Theatre (1942)
- Allez Hopp (1946)
- Hit Parade (1953)
- If I Only Have Your Love (1953)
- The Doctor's Secret (1955)
- The Star of Rio (1955)
- As Long as the Roses Bloom (1956)
- Two Hearts in May (1958)
- Arena of Fear (1959)
- My Daughter Patricia (1959)

== Bibliography ==
- Fritsche, Maria. Homemade Men In Postwar Austrian Cinema: Nationhood, Genre and Masculinity . Berghahn Books, 2013.
