= Margaret of Cortona (film) =

- Directed by: Mario Bonnard
- Written by: Cesare Ludovici; Edoardo Lulli; Nino Scolaro; Guglielmo Zorzi; Mario Bonnard
- Produced by: Alberto Manca
- Starring: Maria Frau; Isa Pola; Galeazzo Benti
- Cinematography: Leonida Barboni
- Edited by: Mario Bonnard
- Music by: Giulio Bonnard
- Production company: Scalera Film
- Release date: 22 February 1950
- Running time: 100 minutes
- Country: Italy
- Language: Italian

Margaret of Cortona (Italian: Margherita da Cortona) is a 1950 Italian historical drama film directed by Mario Bonnard and starring Maria Frau, Isa Pola and Galeazzo Benti. It portrays the life of the thirteenth century saint Margaret of Cortona. The film's sets were designed by the art director Virgilio Marchi.

== Cast ==
- Maria Frau as Margherita
- Isa Pola as Lucia, la matrigna
- Galeazzo Benti as Arsenio del Monte
- Aldo Nicodemi as Marco
- Mario Pisu as Rinaldo Degli Uberti
- Giovanni Grasso as Tancredi, padre di Margherita
- Lorenza Mari as Francesca degli Uberti
- Virginia Balestrieri as Druba
- Carlo Tamberlani as Vescovo
- Mino Doro as Capitano del popolo
- Raimondo Van Riel as messer Dal Monte
- Fulvio Battistini as Zufolo
- Riccardo Billi as Menestrello
- Domenico Serra
- Giovanna Galletti as Madre del bambino ammalato
- Rita Andreana as Popolana al torneo
- Arnaldo Mochetti
- Diego Pozzetto
- Ivo Karavany
- Wally Morocuti
- Peppino Spadaro as Contadino infuriato
- Mario Molfesi
- Claudio Giammi
- Irene Gay
- Tino Buazzelli as Rinaldo degli Uberti
- Nino Capozzi as Paolo
- Giulio Battiferri as Contadino pronto al linciaggio
- Giovanni Onorato as Contadino pronto al linciaggio

== Bibliography ==
- Lucetta Scaraffia & Gabriella Zarri. Women and Faith: Catholic Religious Life in Italy from Late Antiquity to the Present. Harvard University Press, 1999.
