= A Love, A Thief, A Department Store =

1928 film

- Directed by: Karl Theodor Wagner
- Written by: Hans Fritz Köllner
- Cinematography: Werner Bohne
- Production company: Karl Theodor Wagner Film
- Distributed by: Karl Theodor Wagner Film
- Release date: 2 January 1928
- Country: Germany
- Languages: Silent; German intertitles

A Love, A Thief, A Department Store (German: Ein Lieb, ein Dieb, ein Warenhaus) is a 1928 German silent romance film directed by Karl Theodor Wagner.

== Cast ==
In alphabetical order

- Helene Brahms
- Colette Brettel
- Harry Gondi
- Eric Harden
- Rudolf Klein-Rhoden
- Madeleine Lavallier
- Robert Staerk
- Karel Stepanek

== Bibliography ==
- Alfred Krautz. International directory of cinematographers, set- and costume designers in film, Volume 4. Saur, 1984.
