= Allez Hopp =

1946 film

- Directed by: Hans Fritz Köllner
- Cinematography: Heinz von Jaworsky
- Edited by: Fritz Stapenhorst
- Music by: Hans Georg Schütz
- Release date: 1946
- Country: East Germany
- Language: German

Allez Hopp is a 1946 East German film directed by Hans Fritz Köllner. It is set in a circus.

== Cast ==
- Ernst Stahl-Nachbaur as Urmann
- Babsi Schultz-Reckewell as Claudia
- Alfred Cogho as Freddy
- Hilde Körber as Paula Urmann
- Paul Henckels as Schallinger
- Herbert Wilk as Dr. Raimund
- Hans Klering as Fred Matsu
- Aribert Grimmer as Direktor Holl
- Sonja Ziemann as Patsy
- Lili Schoenborn-Anspach as Scheuerfrau
