= The Star of Rio (1955 film) =

1955 film

- German film poster
- German: Stern von Rio
- Directed by: Kurt Neumann
- Written by: Frederick Kohner; Hans Fritz Köllner
- Produced by: Artur Brauner; Frank Clifford; Italo Zingarelli
- Starring: Maria Frau; Johannes Heesters; Willy Fritsch
- Cinematography: Willy Winterstein
- Edited by: Franco Fraticelli; Walter Wischniewsky
- Music by: Willy Mattes
- Production company: CCC Film
- Distributed by: Allianz Filmverleih
- Release date: 9 April 1955
- Running time: 100 minutes
- Countries: West Germany; Italy
- Languages: German; Italian

The Star of Rio (German: Stern von Rio) is a 1955 West German-Italian adventure film directed by Kurt Neumann and starring Maria Frau, Johannes Heesters and Willy Fritsch. It is a remake of the 1940 film of the same title.

It was shot at the Spandau Studios and on location in Brazil with separate German and Italian versions.

== Cast ==
- Maria Frau as Chiquita
- Johannes Heesters as Don Felipe
- Willy Fritsch as Silvester
- Jester Naefe as Dina
- Franco Andrei as Vincente
- Folco Lulli as Mario
- Reinhard Kolldehoff as Torres
- Kathrin Kohner as Bibi
- Stanislav Ledinek as Jao
- Hans Stiebner as Goldschmied
- Mona Baptiste as Sängerin
- Roger George as Tänzer
- Lilo Herbeth as Tänzerin
- Günther Keil
- Franz-Otto Krüger
- Annaluise Schubert as Tänzerin
- Franz Stein
- Rolf Weih
