= German Africa Show =

Deutsche Afrika-Schau ("German Africa Show") was an exhibition touted as an ethnographic depiction of African people and customs that toured Germany in the 1937 to 1940. It was a continuation of earlier Völkerschauen ("people shows"), a human zoo anthropological exhibition that toured in Germany in the decades before Nazi Germany. Nazi propaganda used the Deutsche Afrika-Schau to support returning the German colonial empire and featured depictions praising the African Askari soldiers who had fought for the last Kaiser during World War I. This was, however, at a time when African minorities in Germany were denied basic rights. Bayume Mohamed Husen who had taught Swahili was part of the show along with Kwassi Bruce. Germans with African ancestry dressed up in costumes and performed dances and other acts for the show.
