= Maria Frau =

Italian actress

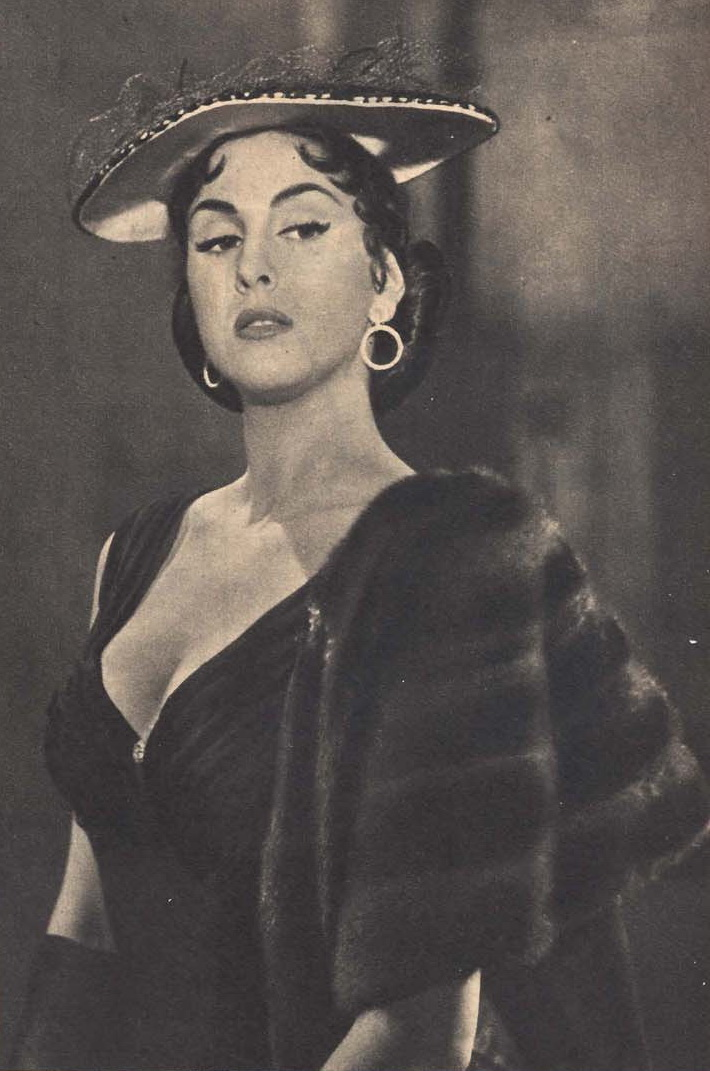
- Frau onstage, 1956
- Born: 6 August 1930 (age 95); Sassari, Kingdom of Italy
- Occupation: Actress
- Years active: 1950–1958 (film)

Maria Frau (born 6 August 1930) is a retired Italian film actress. She made her debut in 1950 when she played the title role in Margaret of Cortona. After appearing in eighteen films she retired from acting in 1957, following her marriage.

== Selected filmography ==
- Margaret of Cortona (1950)
- Red Moon (1951)
- Frontier Wolf (1952)
- Il prezzo dell'onore (1952)
- Sul ponte dei sospiri (1953)
- I Had Seven Daughters (1954)
- Barrier of the Law (1954)
- The Star of Rio (1955)
- Toto in Hell (1955)
- The Goddess of Love (1957)

== Bibliography ==
- Gene Ringgold & DeWitt Bodeen. Chevalier: The Films and Career of Maurice Chevalier. Citadel Press, 1973.
