= St. Margaret of Cortona's Church (Bronx) =

Catholic parish church in New York, US

Coordinates: 40°54′30.96″N 73°54′11.85″W

The Church of St. Margaret of Cortona
- Interactive map of the The Church of St. Margaret of Cortona area

General information
- Location: Riverdale, Bronx, New York, United States
- Construction started: 1890 (for first church)
- Completed: 1891 (for first church)
- Client: Roman Catholic Archdiocese of New York

St. Margaret of Cortona's Church is a parish church under the authority of the Roman Catholic Archdiocese of New York, located at 6000 Riverdale Avenue in the Riverdale neighborhood of the Bronx in New York City.

== Parish history ==
Prior to 1887, Catholics in the Riverdale section of the Bronx attended either St. John's in Kingsbridge or St. Mary's in Yonkers. The parish was established in 1887 by the Rev. James F. Kiley, with initial services being held in St. Vincent's Free School (now Le Gras Hall on the Campus of Mount Saint Vincent College). The first permanent church was erected on the Southeast corner of Riverdale Avenue and West 260th Street and dedicated August 16, 1891 by Archbishop Corrigan. Fr. Kiely was succeeded as pastor by the Rev. Michael J. Murray, who also attended to the Visitation Convent chapel in the parish.

The current church and rectory were built in 1964 on the Northeast corner of Riverdale and West 260th Street; the new church was dedicated in June 1965.

in 2015, the parish of St. Gabriel's merged with St. Margaret's.

== St. Margaret's Parish School ==
In 1875 the Sisters of Charity opened St. Vincent's Free School on the grounds of Mount St. Vincent for the children of the Irish poor, who worked as domestics on the numerous estates that populated Riverdale at the time.

In 1910 Fr. Murray built a school, called Lavelle Hall, but because of financial restraints, could not open it when built. Instead it was leased to the New York City School system in September 1915. When the building of P.S. 81 was completed in 1926, then pastor, Rev. Thomas J. Doyle opened the parish school in September 1926. In 1915, the congregation numbered "464 men, women and children."

== Pastors ==
- Rev. James F. Kiley, 1890-1905, "founder and first rector"
- Rev. Michael J. Murray, 1905-1919, assisted by the Rev. Edward J. Holden
- Rev. James Aylward, 1919-1925
- Monsignor Joseph Doyle, 1925-1962
- Rev. Bartholomew E. Kilcoyne, 1962-1963
- Monsignor James E. Richardson, 1963-1979
- Monsignor Daniel A. Peake, 1979-1991
- Rev. William E. Warren, 1991-2000
- Monsignor John J. Farley, 2000-2006
- Monsignor William J. Foley, 2006-2007
- Rev. Brian P. McCarthy, 2007-2024
- Rev. Seán M. Connolly, 2024-
