= Haus Vaterland =

Former entertainment venue in Berlin, Germany

Coordinates: 52°30′29″N 13°22′38″E

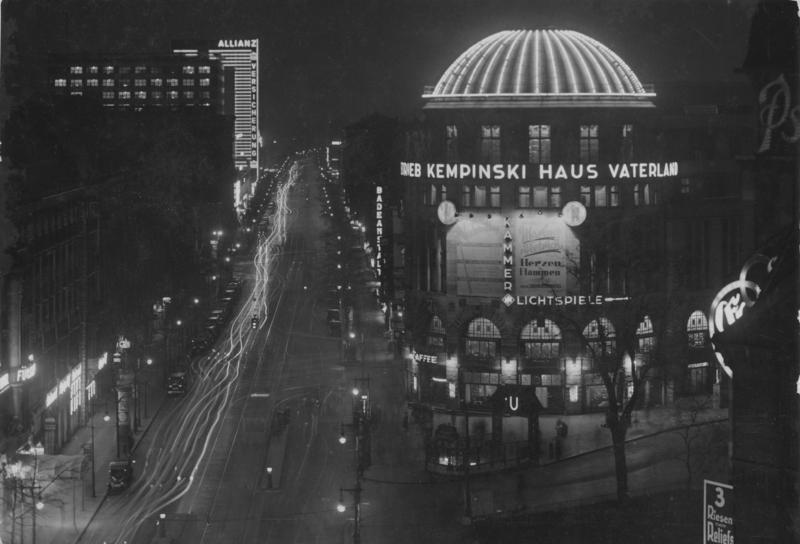
Night view of Haus Vaterland and Stresemannstraße, 1932

Haus Vaterland (Fatherland House) was a pleasure palace on the south-east side of Potsdamer Platz in central Berlin. Preceded by Haus Potsdam, a multi-use building including a large cinema and a huge café, from 1928 to 1943 it was a large, famous establishment including the largest cafe in the world, a major cinema, a large ballroom and numerous theme restaurants, promoted as a showcase of all nations. It was partially destroyed by fire in World War II, reopened in a limited form until 1953, and was finally demolished in 1976.

== History ==
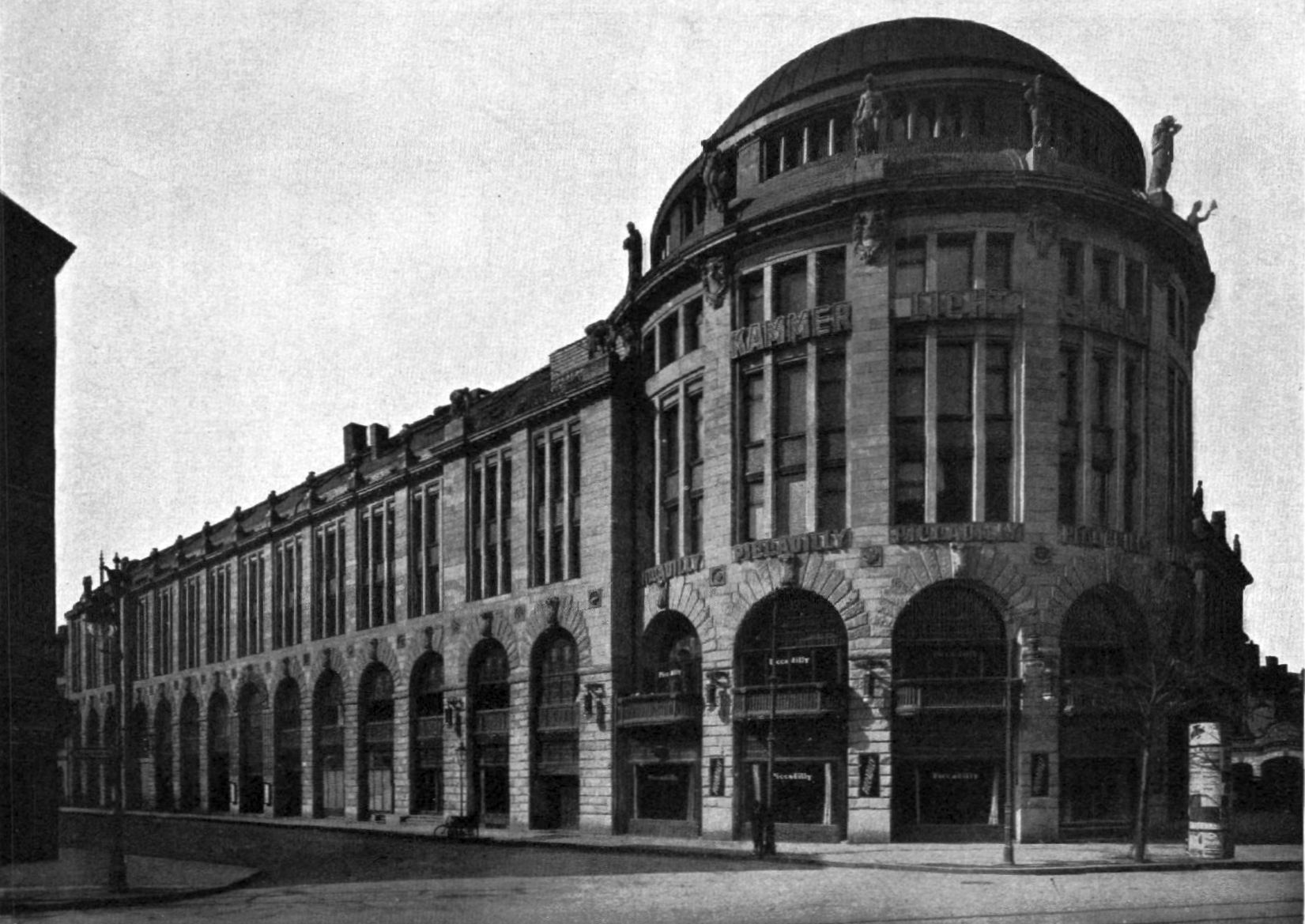
Haus Potsdam, 1913

=== Haus Potsdam ===
The six-storey building was designed by Franz Heinrich Schwechten, who was also the architect of the Anhalter Bahnhof and the Kaiser Wilhelm Memorial Church. It was constructed between 1911 and 1912 as Haus Potsdam. It was primarily an office building; from 1917 or 1919 until 1927 Universum Film AG or UfA, which owned the site, was headquartered there; but the lower floors contained a 1,196-seat cinema, called the Lichtspieltheater im Piccadillyhaus or the Kammerlichtspiele im Haus Potsdam (Cinematograph in the Piccadilly House, Moving Pictures in Haus Potsdam), and the Café Piccadilly. The building was faced with sandstone and gave the impression of masonry, but had a steel frame and the cinema space was spanned by five girders. At the northern end, facing the square, was a circular pavilion topped by a copper dome rising 35 metres above the pavement, with a row of Attic statues beneath it; this was essentially a recreation of the mausoleum of the Ostrogothic king Theodoric the Great in Ravenna. The cafe entrance was on the bottom two floors of this section. Behind it, a long, narrow section in a simplified Wilhelmine architectural style, with a mansard roof, extended some 100 metres alongside the Potsdamer Bahnhof.

The Café Piccadilly could accommodate some 2,500 guests and was lavishly decorated with wall and ceiling paintings and Sienese marble. Operated by Heinrich Braun, it was an attraction comparable to the Moulin Rouge in Paris, drawing "white collar workers, business people and tourists" by day, "amusement seekers, restaurant and variety patrons and also prostitutes" at night. One of Ernst Ludwig Kirchner's Street Scenes cycle of paintings, Potsdamer Platz in Berlin (1914), depicts two prostitutes on a traffic island in front of the building and the Potsdamer Bahnhof. After World War I began in 1914, it was renamed to the more patriotic Café Vaterland. (Note: There is disagreement about the exact new name of the cafe and about when the building was renamed. According to Jeffrey Verhey, The Spirit of 1914: Militarism, Myth and Mobilization in Germany, Cambridge: Cambridge University, 2000, p. 87, Café Piccadilly became Deutsches Café (German Café); according to Werner Hecht, et al., ed., Bertolt Brecht, Werke: grosse kommentierte Berliner und Frankfurter Ausgabe, Volume 1, Stücke I, [East] Berlin: Aufbau/Frankfurt: Suhrkamp, 1989, ISBN 9783351004026/9783518400616, p. 561 (in German), it became Deutsches Kaffeehaus 'Vaterland' ('Fatherland' German Coffeehouse); according to Mark R. McGee, Berlin: A Visual and Historical Documentation from 1925 to the Present, Woodstock, New York: Overlook, 2002, ISBN 978-1-58567-213-4, p. 136, it became the Deutsches Cafehaus (German Coffeehouse), and he and Zeitz among others state that the entire building was renamed Haus Vaterland in 1914; Hänsel and Schmitt, p. 193, also implies this, saying that the cinema became the Kammerlichtspiele im Haus Vaterland in 1914, and Kreimeier, p. 43, refers to it as "the Fatherland House (formerly the Piccadilly)" in 1919. However, according to Green, the building was Haus Potsdam for 16 years. Also Elfi Pracht, M. Kempinski & Co., Historische Kommission zu Berlin, Berlin: Nicolaische Verlagsbuchhandlung Beuermann, 1994, ISBN 978-3-87584-458-0, p. 72 (in German) dates the renaming of the building to 1 February 1928.)

=== Haus Vaterland ===
Haus Potsdam became less successful during the 1920s, and in 1927 was sold to the Bank für Handel und Grundbesitz, which leased it for ten years to the Kempinski family of restaurateurs. They had an exclusive contract to provide all food and drink and to manage the business, which became their flagship. (Note: "Kino - das grosse Traumgeschäft: Bei der UfA machte man das so ..." Der Spiegel. November 29, 1950. (in German) represents it as a direct sale to Kempinski.) In 1928, the building was reopened as Haus Vaterland, based on an idea by Leo Kronau, who had visited Coney Island in New York and wanted to emulate the international attractions in the amusement parks there and improve on Berlin's own imitation, Lunapark. He persuaded the Kempinski family, who had a 65-year track record of success as restaurateurs in Berlin, to convert Haus Potsdam into a Haus der Nationen (house of nations), and became its first artistic director, arranging entertainment to suit the flavour of each of the gastronomic units.

The architect for the conversion, Carl Stahl-Urach, the architect for Fritz Lang's Doctor Mabuse films, (Note: McGee, p. 136, describes him as an entrepreneur.) modernised the exterior by applying stucco and in particular by wiring the domed section to be illuminated at night as an example of Architecture of the Night (Architektur der Nacht) or Light Architecture (Licht-Architektur) which also emulated Coney Island lighting effects. The lettering around the rotunda was illuminated, and approximately 4,000 bulbs arranged in intersecting arcs on the dome turned on and off to create the illusion of spinning motion. A reporter in Germania applauded the "Babylonian dome" as irrefutable evidence that "here, world-capital life is pulsing." David Clay Large describes it as "a beacon of commercial kitsch". Inside, the cafe was renovated and the building extended and the cinema moved to make room for a new entrance block in the centre of the building; in the rest of the space, restaurants dedicated to different countries and regions of the world were constructed. Each was decorated appropriately with dioramas up to 6 metres deep, panoramas, and lighting effects, and served appropriate food; it was an early example of modern theme dining or experiential gastronomy. While the main shows took place in the ballroom, each theme restaurant also had musicians of the appropriate origins on staff to complete the dining experience, including at least six dance bands. (Note: Green notes (p. 223, note 40) that Richard Fleischer, the artistic director from 1935 to 1943, told him that the Wild West cowboys were Americans, but most of the other performers were Germans playing parts. Sontheimer also says the "gypsy" violinists were from Neukölln (p. 164).) A central kitchen occupied the entire top floor, connected to the different dining establishments by pneumatic tubes, through which orders came up, and dumbwaiters, by means of which food was sent down and dirty dishes sent back up; conveyor belts at kitchen level transferred the dishes to be machine washed, dried and stacked. The whole was run on American-influenced principles of industrial efficiency. It published a house magazine called Berolina - Latin for Berlin and most famously embodied in the statue in the Alexanderplatz.

It was an enormous and popular establishment, and like Haus Potsdam before it, is frequently alluded to in both artistic and tourist contexts, for example in Irmgard Keun's 1932 novel Das kunstseidene Mädchen (The Artificial Silk Girl). Its combination of spectacle, variety performances, international dining and cinema was unique. Large sees it as having been "a kind of proto-Disney World". The building could accommodate up to 8,000 people; the 4,454 square metres of theme restaurants had a capacity of 3,500 people and Café Vaterland was the largest in the world; the one millionth guest was recorded in October 1929, barely a year after the opening.

=== Third Reich and World War II ===
In the Nazi years, the mix of restaurants was modified and the Jewish Kempinskis had to sell the building for a pittance to "Aryans" and leave the country. A 1936 French film, Les Loups entre eux (English title: The Sequel to Second Bureau), features scenes in Haus Vaterland, including "the Horst Wessel song booming from the loud-speaker". The business continued to host throngs of customers even after Berlin began to suffer heavy bombing by the Allies. In 1943 the building was damaged, particularly in the central section, in the British night Air-raid on the nights of 22 and 23 November that destroyed much of the centre of the city including the department store KaDeWe. On 3 February 1945 it was bombed out by the U.S.A.A.F. during a daylight raid, only the walls left standing.

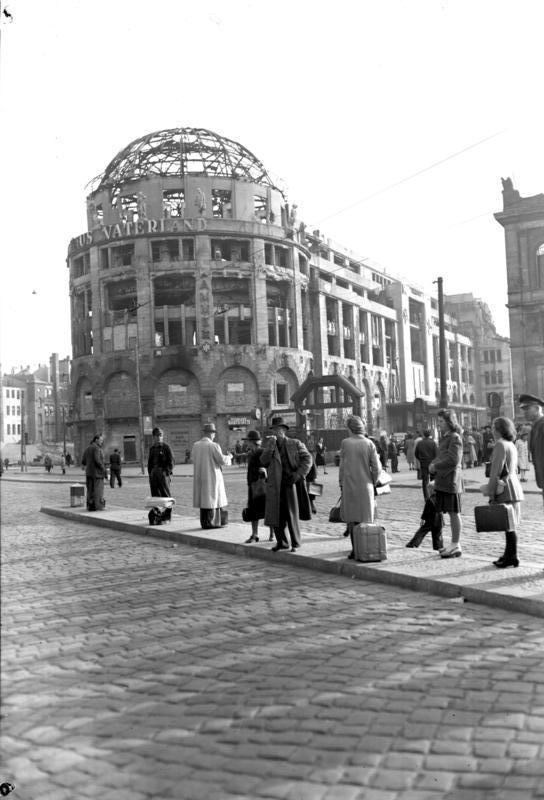
Burnt out ruin of Haus Vaterland after the war, 1947

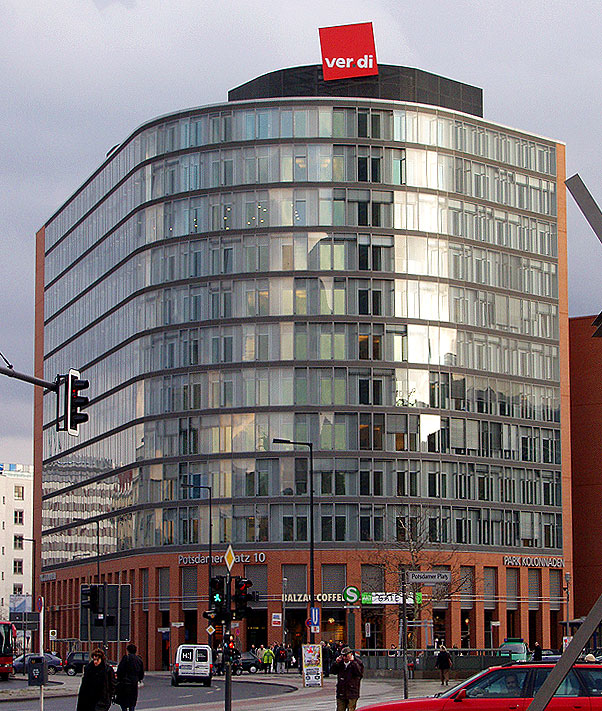
The Park Kolonnaden on the site of the former Haus Vaterland (2004). The semicircular frontage is paying homage to the vanished building.

=== Under occupation ===
After the war, Potsdamer Platz was the point where three of the four Allied occupation zones met. The ruined Haus Vaterland was in the Soviet sector, but had doors to both the British and the American. In 1947, Café Vaterland was reopened in an acclaimed gesture of will to rebuild the city, and in 1948 the Communist cabaret Frischer Wind was playing there, while because of its position on the sector lines, it was a hotbed of spying, flight from the East, and black marketing in currency and goods.

=== Destruction ===
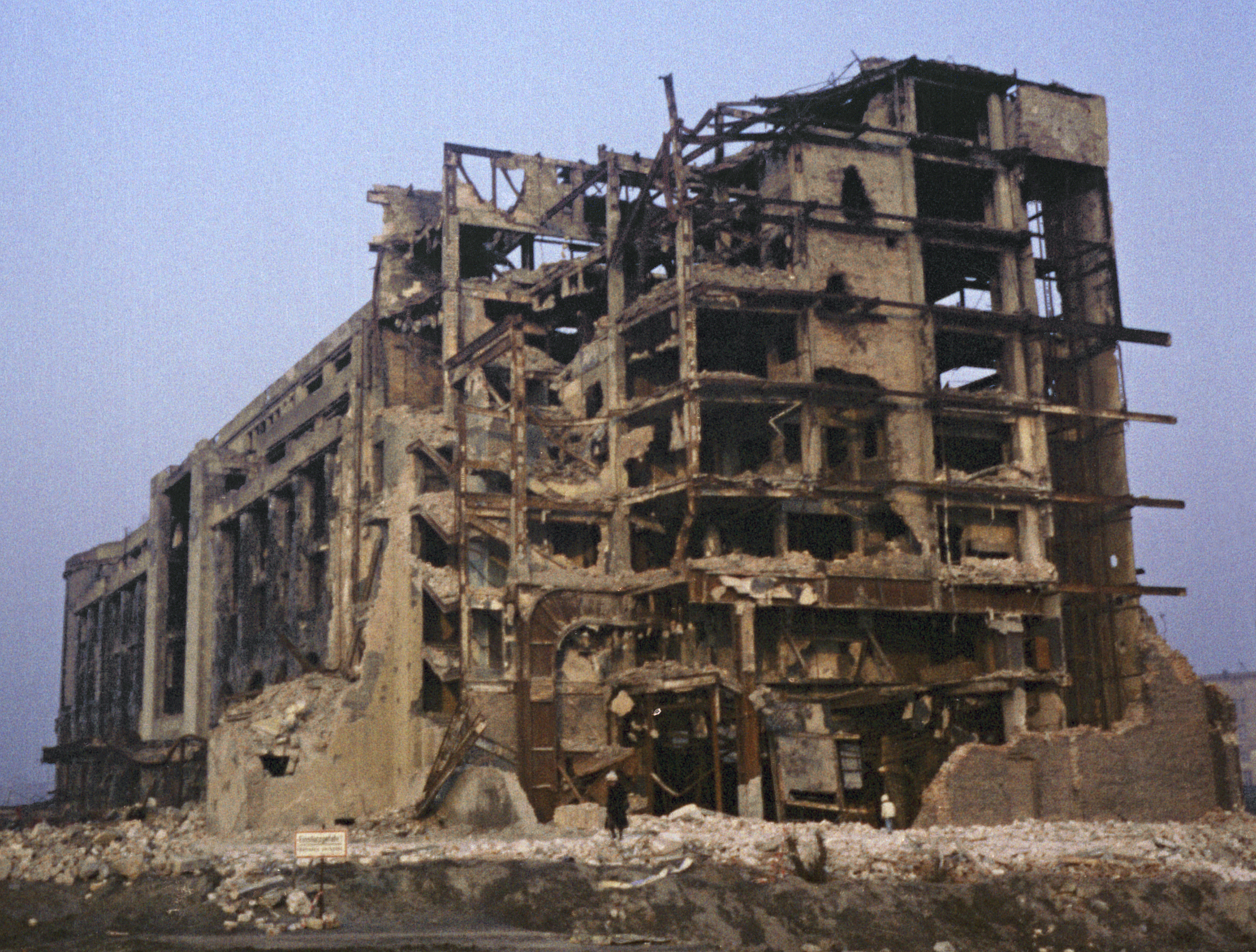
Ruin, view to the North, shortly before destruction: Feb 22, 1976

The building was finally completely burnt out on 17 June 1953, along with Erich Mendelsohn's Columbushaus, during the East German strike and protest. It was then left in ruins, the windows simply being walled up. It was adjacent to the Berlin Wall after its construction in 1961. In 1966 Der Spiegel described the desolation of the Potsdamer Platz during those years, with birch trees growing out of the rubble of what had been the busiest traffic intersection in Europe and kestrels nesting in the ruin of Haus Vaterland and hunting rats which emerged from locked S-Bahn entrances.

In 1972, the Senate of West Berlin bought the building as part of 8.5 hectares of land to build a road, and had it demolished in 1976. The 600 tonnes of iron and steel were sold as scrap. In the mid-1980s artists and members of the alternative culture converted the wasteland, which had been used for dumping and parking, into a caravan colony.

Ironically, when Potsdamer Platz was rebuilt after German reunification, the site of Haus Vaterland was the only parcel on which no entertainment facility was sited, only offices, because it was felt to be too small. The new building abutting the square, which is part of the Park Kolonnaden ensemble, was given a semi-circular façade in homage to the round section of the building which had once stood there.

== Description ==
Haus Vaterland promised die Welt in einem Haus - "the world in one house". Siegfried Kracauer said, "Haus Vaterland includes the entire globe". He also pointed out the contrast between the "exaggerated" New Objectivity in the style of the "immense" lobby and the "luxuriant sentimentality" of the dining establishments as little as one step away. He used this example to argue that the New Objectivity was merely a façade. To Franz Hessel, it was a "perfectly planned city of entertainment" which demonstrated the nascent totalitarianism of "monster Germany". Sydney Clark summed it up in his guide for British tourists as a must-see because it typified Berlin:

I can think of no better way to top off a Berlin night . . . than an hour or two or three in Haus Vaterland. The place is certainly not "high hat," nor is it low hat, but it is of the very essence of Berlin.

The original attractions were:

=== Kammerlichtspiele im Haus Vaterland ===
The cinema, from about 1920 renamed UFA-Haus am Potsdamer Platz, was moved and enlarged to 1,415 seats in Stahl-Urach's renovation. The auditorium was strikingly modern, on a circular plan and with vibrant red carpeting and gold-painted wooden trim on the seats. It was one of five Berlin cinemas Sydney Clark recommended to the American tourist in 1933 as worth seeing (the others being the Titania-Palast, the UFA-Palast am Zoo, the Primus-Palast and the Phoebus Palast).

=== Ballroom ===
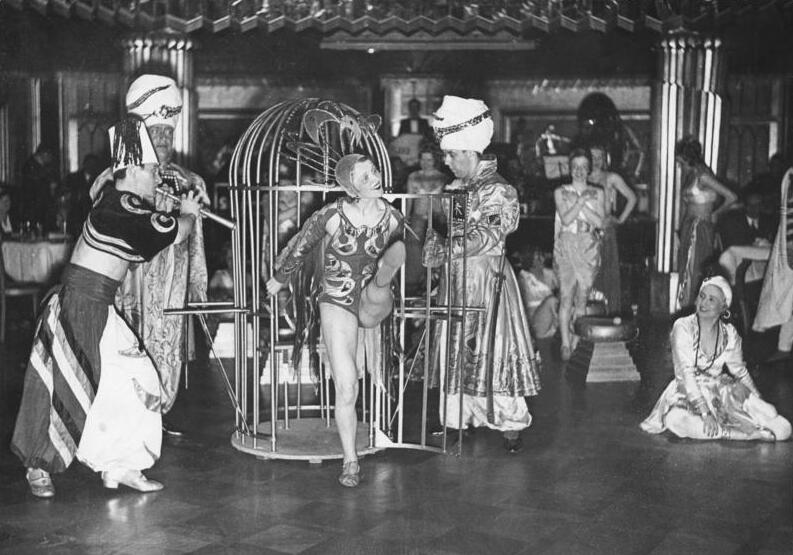
Variety show in the Palmensaal

The ballroom, also called the Palmensaal (palm room) was under the dome, and intended as a re-creation of the Garden of Eden. The Palmensaal had a dance floor mounted on springs to prevent fatigue. It was considered the most beautiful ballroom in Berlin, and attracted up to a million visitors a year. It was decorated with silver palm fronds and sculptures by Josef Thorak, who was to be popular during the Nazi era. Jazzmeister Bill Bartholomew led the house dance band and the "Vaterland-Girls" performed.

=== Grinzinger Heuriger ===
A re-creation of a Viennese Heuriger in Grinzing, on the third floor. The menu included Sachertorte prepared from the authentic recipe; the Kempinskis had an exclusive licence to offer it in Berlin. Guests sampled the new wine looking out at the steeple of St. Stephen's cathedral against a starry sky, and a tram with interior lights lit crossed the bridge over the Danube. In the Berliner Tageblatt, the Austrian writer Arnold Höllriegel declared the place to be far more genuine than the real thing.

=== Rheinterrasse ===
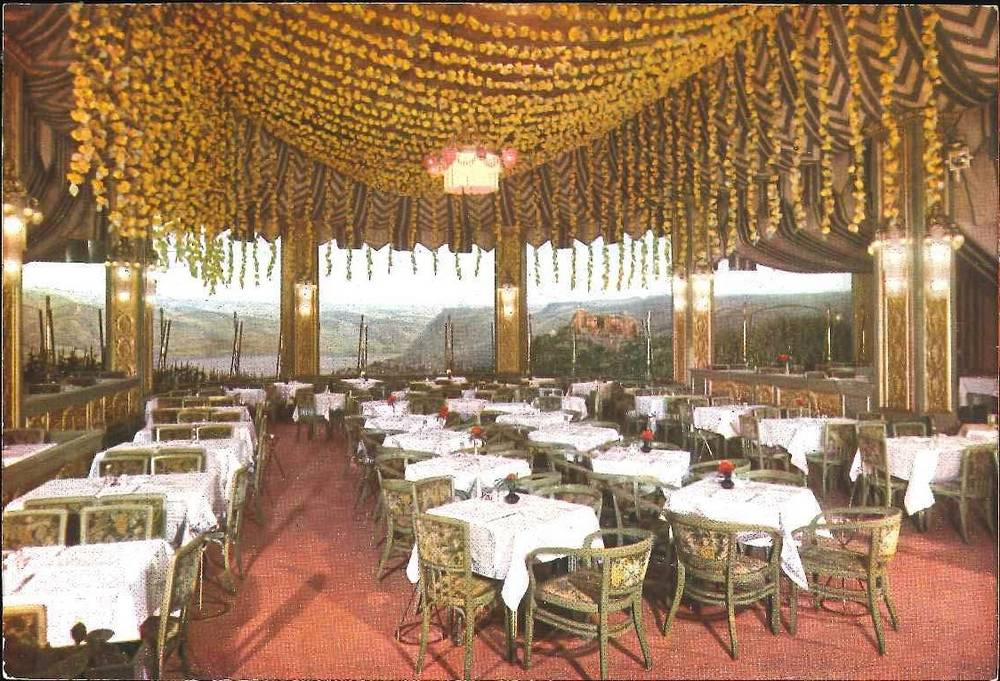
Rheinterrasse

The Rheinterrasse (Rhine terrace) on the third floor in the circular section of the building, had a diorama to give the illusion of sitting outdoors overlooking the river between Sankt Goar and the Lorelei rock. A troupe of twenty "Rhine maidens" danced between the tables under hoops twined with grape vines. Hourly thunderstorms were created by lighting and sound effects; one American visitor reputedly "beam[ed] like a movie theater façade on Broadway" when told about this. The establishment used the motto:

Haus Vaterland machts gründlich – im Haus Vaterland gewitterts stündlich
(Haus Vaterland does it thoroughly - in Haus Vaterland it storms hourly) (Note: Some sources have Im Haus Vaterland ißt man gründlich, hier gewitterts stündlich - In Haus Vaterland one dines thoroughly, here it storms hourly.)

=== Türkisches Café ===
The Türkisches Café (Turkish cafe), on the fourth floor, had gilded arches and marble floors.

=== Löwenbräu ===
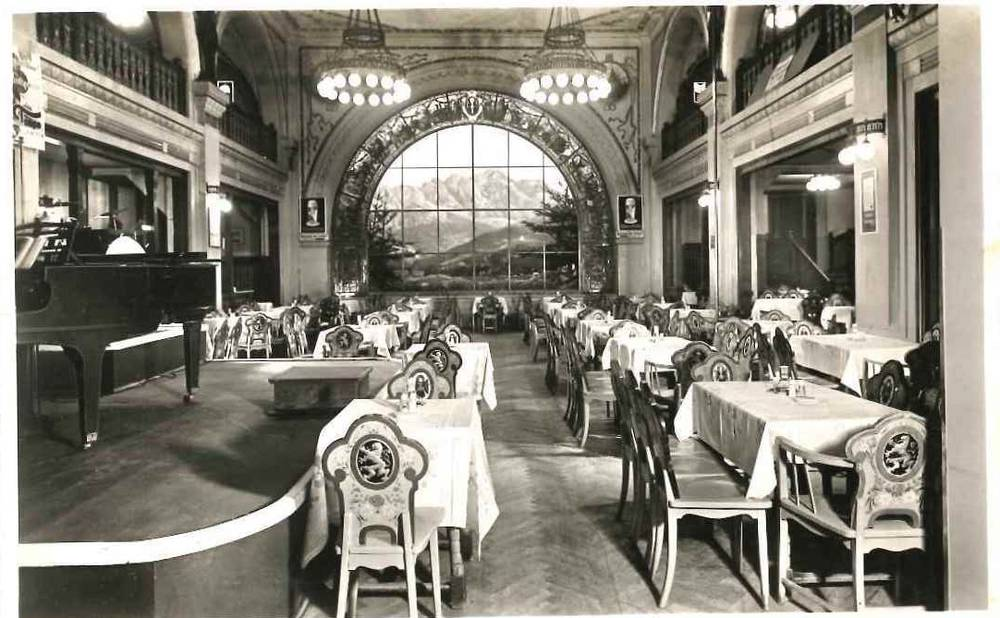
Löwenbräu

The Löwenbräu, across from the Türkisches Café on the fourth floor, emulated a Bavarian bierkeller and looked out on a painted view of the Zugspitze, behind which diners could watch the sun set. An "original Bavarian band" provided the entertainment.

=== Puszta Czardas ===
A Hungarian peasant tavern, on the fifth floor, with gypsy violinists.

=== Bodega ===
A Spanish wine cellar, also on the fifth floor, with mandoline players.

=== Wild West Bar ===
A frontier saloon in the Rocky Mountains, also on the fifth floor. Dancing was to American jazz, and cowboys in full western get-up, some of them black, twirled their lassos. Beautiful chorus girls also performed there. Sidney Bechet played there in the early 1930s, with "The McAllan Blackband", which was led by the Somali-German drummer William 'Willi' Mac Allan, and the "Tom Bill Nigger Band". It was later renamed the Kolonialstube (colonial parlour).

There were no British or French rooms because Kempinski was too patriotic to forgive them for the Treaty of Versailles. In 1930, the Bodega was relocated to make room for two more regional German rooms:

=== Bremer Kombüse ===
The Bremen Galley, named for the ship-board cooking of the North German seaport.

=== Teltower Rübchen ===
An "old Berlin beerhall" named for the variety of turnips named for Teltow, near Berlin.

Two small rooms were also added to honour friends of the Third Reich, although before the Tripartite Pact of 1940:

=== Japanische Teestube ===
A Japanese teahouse, with "original Japanese service".

=== Osteria ===
An Italian bar, replacing the Hungarian Czardas.

Reflecting changing political situations, there were also at one point a Russian vodka bar and a French bistro.

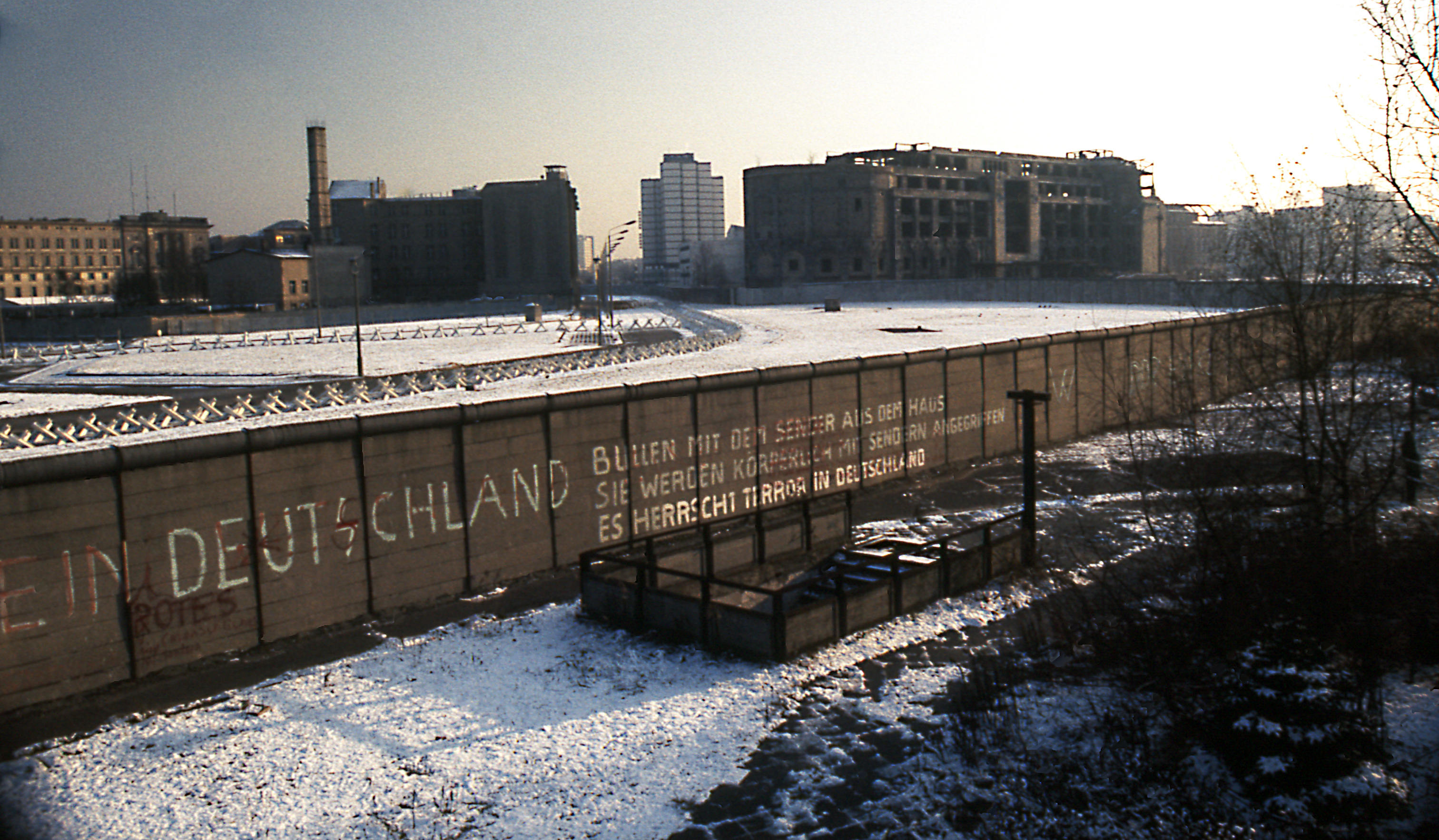
Berlin wall and Potsdamer Platz in 1975, Haus Vaterland ruin on the right

== Sources ==
- Peter Lummel. "Erlebnisgastronomie um 1900 – Das „Haus Vaterland“ in Berlin". Herbert May and Andrea Schilz, eds. Gasthäuser: Geschichte und Kultur. Arbeit und Leben auf dem Lande 9. Exhibition catalogue, Museen des Ausstellungsverbundes. Petersberg: Imhof, 2004. 193–206.
