= The Star of Rio (1940 film) =

1940 film directed by Karl Anton

- German film poster
- German: Stern von Rio
- Directed by: Karl Anton
- Written by: Felix von Eckardt; Hans Fritz Köllner
- Produced by: Heinrich Jonen
- Starring: La Jana; Gustav Diessl; Harald Paulsen
- Cinematography: Erich Grohmann; Bruno Mondi
- Edited by: Martha Dübber
- Music by: Willy Engel-Berger
- Production company: Tobis Film
- Distributed by: Tobis Film
- Release date: 20 March 1940
- Running time: 95 minutes
- Country: Germany
- Language: German

The Star of Rio (German: Stern von Rio) is a 1940 German comedy thriller film directed by Karl Anton and starring La Jana, Gustav Diessl and Harald Paulsen. In 1955 it was remade as a film of the same title.

== Cast ==
- La Jana as Concha
- Gustav Diessl as Don Felipe Escobar
- Harald Paulsen as Jacobo
- Werner Scharf as Vincente
- Fritz Kampers as Pieter Jonken
- Max Gülstorff as Adrian
- Hubert von Meyerinck as Monsieur Louis Borinage
- Olaf Bach as Kempsey, the Brazilian police chief
- Gerhard Dammann as an old sailor in Amsterdam
- Karl Dannemann as a Dutch port police officer
- Ernst Dernburg as Brazilian consul
- Mia Elmenhorst
- Max Harry Ernst as spectator at Conchas Revue
- Karl Fochler
- Charles Francois as guest at Senor Felipe's garden party
- Karl Günther as Sörensen, concert agent
- Harry Hardt as Ribera, the secretary of Senor Felipe
- Kurt Iller
- Alfred Karen
- Charlie Kracker
- Ida Krill
- Henry Lorenzen
- Alfred Maack
- Heinz Müller
- Paul Otto as Ter Neer
- Grete Reinwald as Leiterin the diamond shower
- Else Reval as cleaning woman
- Ernst Rotmund
- Tine Schneider
- Wilfried Seyferth as journalist, the assistant of Herrn Hadrian
- Alfred Stratmann
- Eleonore Tappert
- Elisabeth von Ruets as old rich customer of the show
- Eugen Wolff
