= San Francesco, Cortona =

Roman Catholic church in Tuscany, Italy

Coordinates: 43°16′31″N 11°59′13″E

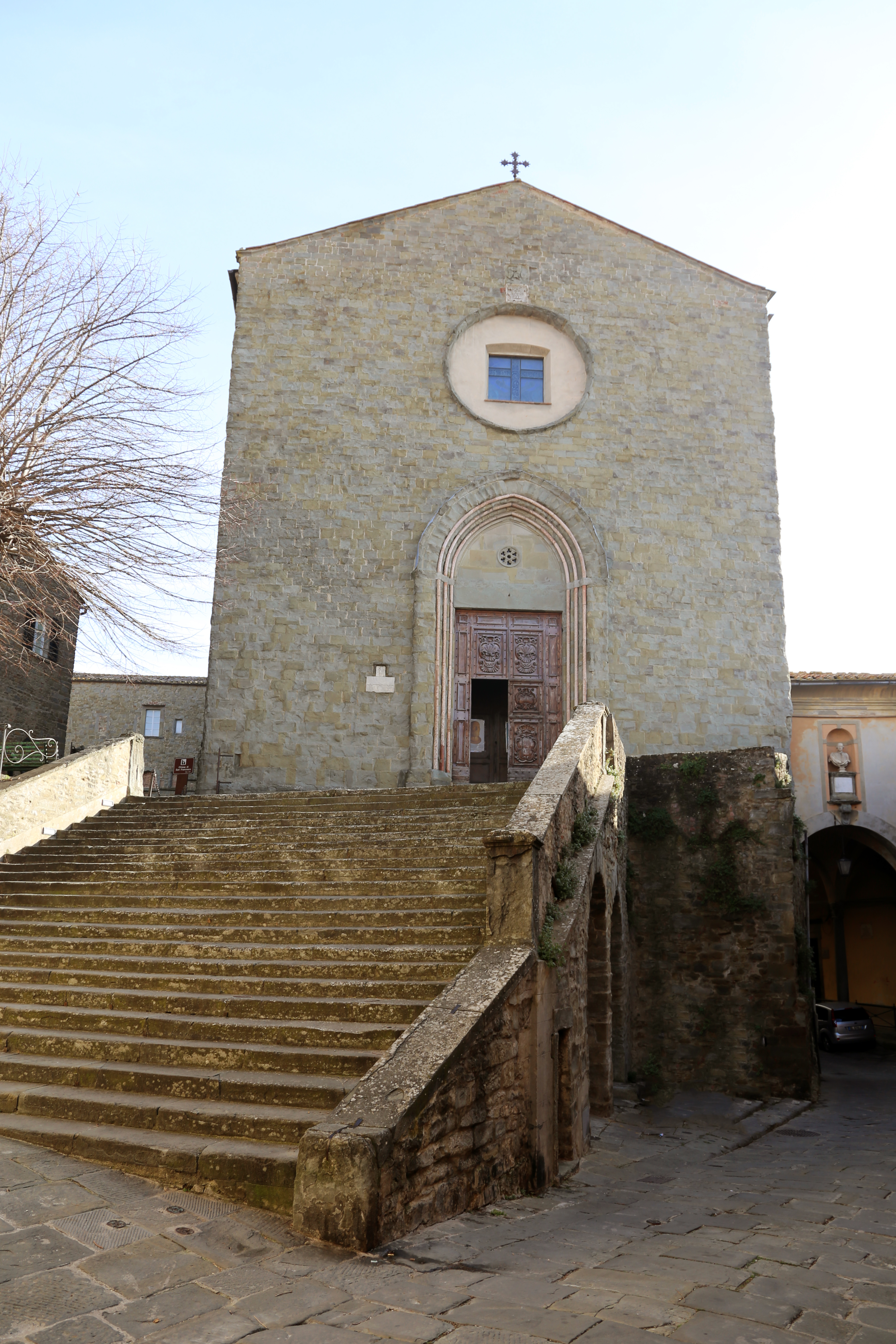
Church exterior

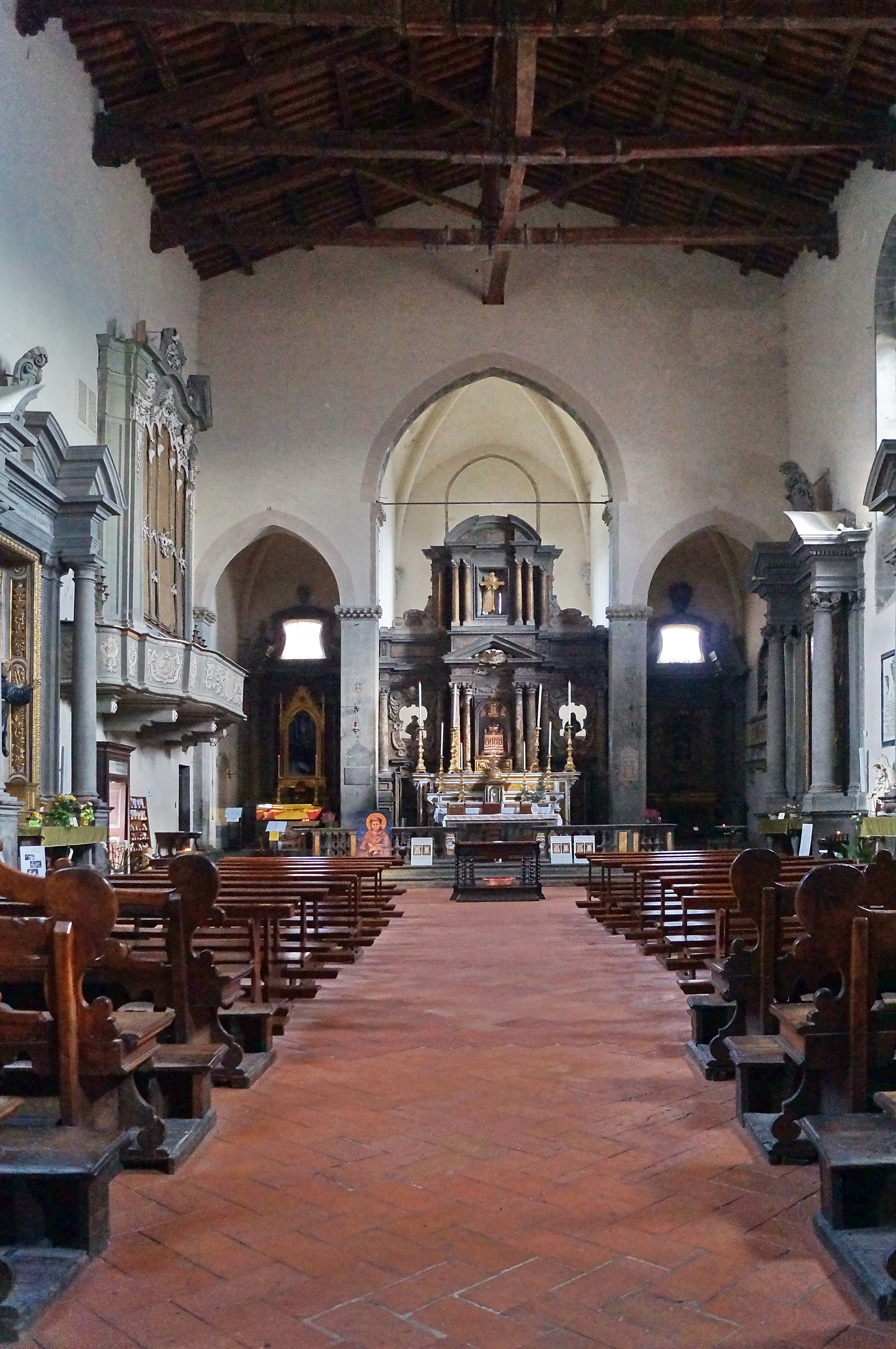
Church interior

San Francesco is a 13th-century, Roman Catholic church located on via Berrettini in Cortona, region of Tuscany, Italy.

== History ==
Built in 1245, the church has the typical Franciscan pattern: a large nave ending in an apse with a groin vault, flanked by two smaller side-chapels also with groin vaults.

The facade holds a lancet-arched main doorway with three small columns in a recess, and a large circular window set above. In the apse are the mouldings of the partially walled Gothic windows. On the left the eastern wing of the cloister is visible, where there are two windows, now filled with masonry, and an arched doorway belonging to the Chapter House.

Inside can be seen some distinguished artworks, including the Nativity of Raffaello Vanni, the Annunciation by Pietro da Cortona, St. Anthony of Padua and the miracle of the mule by Cigoli (1597), and the Virgin in glory among the saints by Ciro Ferri. In the Convent of the Conventual Franciscan Friars (the guardians of the church) are carefully preserved some relics of St. Francis of Assisi, namely a habit, a finely embroidered cushion on which the dying saint laid his head (donated by Settesoli Giacoma de Santo, a noble lady of patrician Marino, who loved to call Francis Iacopo), and also a book of the Gospel.

Also in this church is a preserved fragment of the Holy Cross, in a reliquary of Byzantine work in ivory and silver. It was brought from Constantinople to Cortona by Friar Elia Coppi, whom San Francesco named as his mother and a father for the other brothers, the successor to the leadership of the Conventual Franciscan Friars. P. Eugen Rachiteanu governed the church and the convent together with two other monks from the Conventual Franciscan Province of Romania.
