= Elsholtz =

Elsholtz (German pronunciation: ['ɛls.hɔlts]) is a German surname. Notable people with the surname include:

- Arne Elsholtz (1944–2016), German actor, voice actor and dialogue director
- Johann Sigismund Elsholtz (1623–1688), German naturalist
- Ludwig Elsholtz (1805–1850), German painter
- Peter Elsholtz (1907–1977), German actor
