= Donogoo Tonka =

1936 film

- Directed by: Reinhold Schünzel
- Written by: Jules Romains (play); Reinhold Schünzel
- Produced by: Erich von Neusser
- Starring: Anny Ondra; Viktor Staal; Will Dohm
- Cinematography: Friedl Behn-Grund
- Edited by: Arnfried Heyne
- Music by: Franz Doelle; Werner Eisbrenner
- Production company: UFA
- Distributed by: UFA
- Release date: 24 January 1936
- Running time: 100 minutes
- Country: Germany
- Language: German

Donogoo Tonka is a 1936 German comedy film directed by Reinhold Schünzel and starring Anny Ondra, Viktor Staal and Will Dohm. It is based on a play of the same name by Jules Romains. A separate French-language version Donogoo was also made. The film was produced by UFA at the Babelsberg Studios in Berlin, with sets designed by Otto Hunte and Willy Schiller.

== Cast ==
- Anny Ondra as Josette
- Viktor Staal as Pierre Lamendin
- Will Dohm as Albert
- Heinz Salfner as Trouhadec
- Aribert Wäscher as Margajat
- Oskar Sima as Broudier
- Paul Bildt as Rufisque
- Albert Florath as Voisin
- Rudolf Platte as Simplou
- Tine Schneider as Sekretärin
- Ewald Wenck as Beamter
- Ernst Behmer as Polizist
- Olga Limburg as Direktrice
- Franz Weber as Verkäufer
- Carl Auen as Auswanderer
- Beppo Brem as Auswanderer
- Arthur Reinhardt as Auswanderer
- Walter von Allwoerden as Auswanderer
- Jac Diehl as Auswanderer
- Max Schreck as Auswanderer
- Herbert Weissbach
- Elisabeth Neumann-Viertel as Auswandererfrau
- Jutta von Wedel as Auswandererfrau

== Bibliography ==
- Kreimeier, Klaus. The Ufa Story: A History of Germany's Greatest Film Company, 1918–1945. University of California Press, 1999.
