= Marriage of Affection =

1944 film directed by Carl Froelich

- Directed by: Carl Froelich
- Written by: Jochen Kuhlmey (play); Julius Stinde (novel)
- Produced by: Carl Froelich
- Starring: Henny Porten; Elisabeth Flickenschildt; Käthe Dyckhoff
- Cinematography: Robert Baberske
- Edited by: Wolfgang Schleif
- Music by: Hans-Otto Borgmann
- Production company: UFA
- Distributed by: Deutsche Filmvertriebs
- Release date: 24 March 1944
- Running time: 94 minutes
- Country: Germany
- Language: German

Marriage of Affection (German: Neigungsehe) is a 1944 German historical drama film directed by Carl Froelich and starring Henny Porten, Elisabeth Flickenschildt and Käthe Dyckhoff. It was released as a direct sequel to The Buchholz Family.

The film was shot at the Tempelhof Studios in Berlin.

== Cast ==
- Henny Porten as Wilhelmine Buchholz
- Elisabeth Flickenschildt as Kathinka Bergfeldt
- Käthe Dyckhoff as Betti Buchholz
- Marianne Simson as Emmi Wrenzchen
- Grethe Weiser as Köchin Jette
- Sigrid Becker as Auguste Bergfeldt
- Renée Stobrawa as Adelheid Hampel
- Gustav Fröhlich as Dr. Franz Wrenzchen
- Albert Hehn as Friedrich Wilhelm Holle
- Paul Westermeier as Karl Buchholz
- Hans Zesch-Ballot as Onkel Fritz
- Kurt Vespermann as Dr. Julius Stinde
- Werner Stock as Franz Weigelt
- Helmuth Helsig as Gardefüsilier Gottfried Großkopf
- Oscar Sabo as August Butsch
- Fritz Kampers as Xaver Alinger
- Irmingard Schreiter as Erika von Rüdnitz
- Carl Heinrich Worth as Professor Hampel
- Günther Lüders as Lothar Manning
- Rolf Raatz as Zwilling Rolf
- Roland Raatz as Zwilling Roland
- Frauke Stephan as Amanda Ziesel
- Elisabeth Botz as Mutter Jaspersen
- Margarete Schön as Frau Reiferstein
- Hella Thornegg as Pauline
- Egon Vogel as Eugen Meyer
- Hugo Gau-Hamm as Lotse Nummel Claasen
- Marion Lorenzen as Mädchen aus Helgoland
- Erich Fiedler as Emil Bergfeldt
- Hans Hermann Schaufuß as Max Bergfeldt

== Bibliography ==
- Hans-Michael Bock and Tim Bergfelder. The Concise Cinegraph: An Encyclopedia of German Cinema. Berghahn Books, 2009.
