= Haacker =

Haacker is a surname. Notable people with the surname include:

- Karl Haacker (1890–1945), German art director
- Kathrin Haacker (born 1967), German rower

== See also ==
- Hacker
