= A Girl Goes Ashore =

1938 film

- Directed by: Werner Hochbaum
- Written by: Eva Leidmann; Werner Hochbaum
- Produced by: Erich von Neusser
- Starring: Elisabeth Flickenschildt; Günther Lüders; Heidi Kabel
- Cinematography: Werner Krien
- Edited by: Else Baum
- Music by: Theo Mackeben
- Production company: UFA
- Distributed by: UFA
- Release date: 30 September 1938
- Running time: 95 minutes
- Country: Germany
- Language: German

A Girl Goes Ashore (German: Ein Mädchen geht an Land) is a 1938 German drama film directed by Werner Hochbaum and starring Elisabeth Flickenschildt, Günther Lüders and Heidi Kabel. It is set in the port city of Hamburg and was partly shot on location there.

It was made at the Babelsberg Studios in Berlin as well as in Hamburg. The film's sets were designed by the art directors Karl Haacker and Willy Schiller.

== Cast ==
In alphabetical order:

- Franz Arzdorf as Dr. Ried
- Herbert A.E. Böhme as Friedrich Semmler
- Erich Feldt as Heinrich Semmler
- Elisabeth Flickenschildt as Erna Quandt
- Berta Gast as Amalie Stürmer
- Erika Glässner as Frau Juhl, Widow
- Karl Günther as Walter Stürmer
- Heidi Kabel as Inge
- Carl Kuhlmann as Jonny Hasenbein
- Lotte Lang as Maid
- Günther Lüders as Krischan
- Alfred Maack as Quandt
- Hans Mahler as Hein Groterjahn
- Edith Meinhard
- Claus Michahelles as Rolfi Semmler
- Luise Morland as Grete Schilling
- Maria Paudler as Lisa Stürmer
- Walter Petersen as Otto
- Claire Reigbert as Aunt Mariechen
- Friedrich Schmidt as Captain Lüders
- Gisela Scholz as Emma Semmler
- Bruno Wolfgang as Alfred

== Bibliography ==
- Kreimeier, Klaus (1999). The Ufa Story: A History of Germany's Greatest Film Company, 1918–1945. University of California Press. ISBN 978-0-520-22069-0.
