= The Buchholz Family =

1944 film directed by Carl Froelich

- German DVD cover
- German: Familie Buchholz
- Directed by: Carl Froelich
- Written by: Julius Stinde (novel); Jochen Kuhlmey
- Produced by: Carl Froelich
- Starring: Henny Porten; Paul Westermeier; Käthe Dyckhoff; Marianne Simson
- Cinematography: Robert Baberske
- Edited by: Wolfgang Schleif
- Music by: Hans-Otto Borgmann
- Production company: UFA
- Distributed by: Deutsche Filmvertriebs
- Release date: 3 March 1944
- Running time: 92 minutes
- Country: Germany
- Language: German

The Buchholz Family (German: Familie Buchholz) is a 1944 German drama film directed by Carl Froelich and starring Henny Porten, Paul Westermeier, and Käthe Dyckhoff. Based on an 1884 novel by Julius Stinde, it is a family chronicle set in late nineteenth century Berlin. The same year saw the release of a second part Marriage of Affection. It was shot at the Tempelhof Studios in Berlin. The film's sets were designed by the art director Walter Haag.

== Cast ==
- Henny Porten as Wilhelmine Buchholz
- Paul Westermeier as Carl Buchholz, son
- Käthe Dyckhoff as Betti, daughter
- Marianne Simson as Emmi, daughter
- Hans Zesch-Ballot as Fritz Fabian
- Gustav Fröhlich as Dr. Franz Wrenzchen, gynecologist
- Grethe Weiser as Jette
- Elisabeth Flickenschildt as Kathinka Bergfeldt
- Hans Hermann Schaufuß as Bergfeldt's accountant
- Erich Fiedler as Emil
- Sigrid Becker as August
- Werner Stock as Franz Weigel
- Jakob Tiedtke as Weigel's father
- Albert Hehn as Friedrich Wilhelm Holle, painter
- Kurt Vespermann as Julius Stinde, publisher
- Maria Loja as Frau Posener
- Hellmut Helsig as Gardefüsilier Gottfried
- Vera Achilles as Cilly Posener
- Oscar Sabo as August Butsch
- Carl Heinrich Worth as Prof. Hampel
- Renée Stobrawa as Adelheid Hampel
- Irmingard Schreiter as Erika von Rüdnitz
- Charles Francois as Kellner
- Illo Gutschwager as young waiter
- Max Hiller as Poseners' servant
- Alfred Karen as Gast im Kegellokal
- Matthew Bucholz as Matthew Bucholz
- Matthew Adcock as Mease

== Bibliography ==
- Noack, Frank. Veit Harlan: The Life and Work of a Nazi Filmmaker. University Press of Kentucky, 2016.
