= Harald Arrives at Nine =

1944 film directed by Carl Boese

- Directed by: Carl Boese
- Written by: Harald Bratt; Herbert Engelsing
- Produced by: Herbert Engelsing
- Starring: Irene von Meyendorff; Anneliese Uhlig; Werner Fuetterer
- Cinematography: Igor Oberberg
- Edited by: Elise Lustig; Johanna Rosinski
- Music by: Ernst Erich Buder
- Production company: Tobis Film
- Distributed by: Deutsche Filmvertriebs
- Release date: 6 January 1944
- Running time: 86 minutes
- Country: Germany
- Language: German

Harald Arrives at Nine (German: Um neun kommt Harald) is a 1944 German crime drama film directed by Carl Boese and starring Irene von Meyendorff, Anneliese Uhlig and Werner Fuetterer. It was shot at the Johannisthal Studios in Berlin. The film's sets were designed by the art directors Franz Koehn and Hans Kuhnert.

== Synopsis ==
Edith has a row with her guardian due to her wish to go and live with her fiancée Harald. When his body is discovered by a servant, suspicion falls on both Edith and Harald of his murder. The defence attorney Reinhardt sets out to try and prove the couple were innocent and find the real culprit.

== Cast ==
- Irene von Meyendorff as Edith Gedeye
- Anneliese Uhlig as Rechtsanwältin Dr. Reinhardt
- Werner Fuetterer as Harald Heimendahl
- Hans Nielsen as Rechtsanwalt Dr. Tromsa
- Roma Bahn as Wirtschafterin Heimendahl
- Josef Sieber as Hausdiener Paul Winkelmann
- Herbert Hübner as 1. Gerichtsvorsitzender
- Otto Graf as Staatsanwalt
- Albert Florath as Finanzier Brunnen
- Ellen Bang as Illa Weißmantel
- Josef Kamper as Kriminalassistent
- Werner Pledath as Arzt Dr. Böhm
- Helmuth Helsig as Kriminalkommissar

== Bibliography ==
- Bock, Hans-Michael . Die Tobis 1928-1945: eine kommentierte Filmografie. Edition Text + Kritik, 2003.
- Klaus, Ulrich J. Deutsche Tonfilme. Klaus-Archiv, 1988.
