= Two Worlds (1940 film) =

1940 film

- Directed by: Gustaf Gründgens
- Written by: Felix Lützkendorf; Stefanie von Below
- Produced by: Gustaf Gründgens; Eduard Kubat
- Starring: Marianne Simson; Antje Weisgerber; Max Eckard
- Cinematography: Walter Pindter
- Edited by: Anna Höllering
- Music by: Michael Jary
- Production company: Terra Film
- Distributed by: Terra Film
- Release date: 5 January 1940
- Running time: 89 minutes
- Country: Germany
- Language: German

Two Worlds (German: Zwei Welten) is a 1940 German drama film directed by Gustaf Gründgens and starring Marianne Simson, Antje Weisgerber and Max Eckard. It was shot at the Tempelhof Studios in Berlin and on location around Nauen and Zeesen. The film's sets were designed by the art directors Herta Böhm and Traugott Müller.

== Cast ==
- Marianne Simson as Agnes Bremer-Bratt
- Antje Weisgerber as Brigitte
- Max Eckard as Werner von Rednitz
- Joachim Brennecke as Hans Schulz
- Ida Wüst as Alwine Bremer-Bratt
- Hadrian Maria Netto as Ökonomierat Bremer-Bratt
- Berta Monnard as Mutter Schulz
- Paul Bildt as Werkmeister Schulz
- Friedel Hanses as Leni, Gretes Freundin
- Hansi Wendler as Grete Schulz
- Edda Seippel as Anna, Hausmädchen
- Jakob Sinn as Inspektor Müllner

== Bibliography ==
- Hull, David Stewart. Film in the Third Reich: A Study of the German Cinema, 1933–1945. University of California Press, 1969.
- Klaus, Ulrich J. Deutsche Tonfilme: Jahrgang 1940. Klaus-Archiv, 1988.
- Waldman, Harry. Nazi Films in America, 1933-1942. McFarland, 2008.
