= Rivalen der Luft =

Rivalen der Luft - Ein Segelfliegerfilm
- Directed by: Frank Wysbar
- Written by: Walter Forster
- Based on: an idea by Philipp Lothar Mayring
- Produced by: Karl Ritter, Universum Film AG (UFA)
- Starring: Claus Clausen; Wolfgang Liebeneiner; Hilde Gebühr; Sybille Schmitz; Walter Gross; Guzzi Lantschner; Werner Stock; Franz Zimmermann; Volker von Collande; Hans Henninger; Florian Zeise-Gött; Wolff von Wernsdorf; Otto Arndt; M. Bohlan; Alfred Böhm; Hans Deutschmann; Edgar Dittmar; Heini Dittmar; Wolf Hirth; Franz Orthbandt; Hanna Reitsch; Fritz Stamer
- Cinematography: Hans Schneeberger
- Edited by: Willy Zeyn
- Music by: Franz R. Friedl based on compositions by Herbert Windt
- Production company: UFA
- Release date: 19 January 1934
- Running time: 98 minutes
- Country: Germany
- Language: German

Rivalen der Luft – ein Segelfliegerfilm (Engl: Rivals of the Air – a film on gliding) is a German film released in January 1934, which was banned in 1945 by the Allied Control Council as a Nazi propaganda film, although it was later removed from the list of so-called Conditional Films.

== Plot ==
Using the topic of gliding flight and a love story as background, the film depicts the struggle of humans with nature in a very heroic and lofty fashion. A rivalry between two glider pilots over a woman and over flying trophies is used as allegory of the struggle of man against nature, but also as the struggle of Germany against its (supposed) enemies.
The two high school students Karl and Christine feel strongly about gliding flight and thus quit school to follow their instructor Frahms to the gliding academy in Rossitten. Both want to obtain their gliding pilot license to participate in the annual gliding competition in the Rhön Mountains. In the course of the training, a rivalry between instructor Frahms and his student Karl grows stronger. On the one hand, they are about to compete in the gliding competition, but they also compete for Christine's affection. Christine, in turn, participates in the competition under a false name; during her flight she is caught in a thunderstorm and gets off-course. Frahms flies to her rescue and hence wins her heart, while Karl wins the competition as his main rival — Frahms — took himself out of the race with this rescue mission.

== Production ==
The outdoor scenes were shot over the course of two months at the gliding center of the Deutsche Forschungsanstalt für Segelflug (DFS) in Rossitten. While the main site of the DFS was on top of the Wasserkuppe mountain in the Rhön Mountains, the dunes of the Curonian Spit in East Prussia in which Rossiten was located provided for a more picturesque and romantic setting. Another reason was that this location was also politically charged, as East Prussia became separated from Germany after the latter had to cede territory to Poland after World War I. The ceded provinces became known as Polish Corridor, which was a contentious issue for the German right-wing parties in the Weimar Republic and then in the Third Reich. Only the scenes showing the protagonists participating in the gliding competition were shot on the Wasserkuppe — during the actual competition.

== Background ==
All motorized aviation was banned by the Treaty of Versailles after World War I. Until 1925, this included sports flying; but military aviation remained banned even after that. As the Treaty was seen as a humiliation of Germany — especially on the far right — all flying assumed a subversive, right-wing character in Germany in the 1920s and 1930s. Gliding flight was thus more ″serious″ in Germany than in other countries, where it was often belittled as a hobby for adolescent boys. Even in Weimar Germany gliding flight was seen as a means to build up a "silent reserve" of pilots. As the Nazis waited until 1935 before they officially reinstated the Luftwaffe, this film from the early Nazi years on flying was seen as tool to create an interest in aviation with youngsters. Contemporary aviation magazines for example, such as Luftwelt, frequently contained advertisements calling Hitler Youth members to join gliding clubs.
The DFS, which would be involved in doing aeronautical research for the V1 in World War II among other things, provided the air fields, the know-how, as well as a number of its pilots (such as Hanna Reitsch) for the flying scenes.
Against this background, the plot of "Rivalen der Luft" must be seen in a more critical light. Terms like "Bravery", "Ideology" or "Virility" are used more often than usual in the dialogues; these terms were also frequently used in other Nazi propaganda outlets. Because of this embedding of the story into the Nazi ideology, the Allies banned the movie after the war.

== Literature ==
- Giesen, Rolf & Manfred Hobsch: Hitlerjunge Quex, Jud Süss und Kolberg. Die Propagandafilme des Dritten Reiches. Dokumente und Materialien zum NS-Film, Berlin: Schwarzkopf & Schwarzkopf Verlag, 2005
- Liebeneiner, Wolfgang: Glückhafter Segelflug in Rossitten, in: Luftwelt, Vol. 1, Nr. 2, 1934, p. 20.
- Lünen, Alexander von: Die Deutsche Forschungsanstalt für Segelflug, in Andreas Göller and Annegret Holtmann-Mares (Hg.), Ein Jahrhundert Luftfahrtgeschichte zwischen Tradition, Forschung und Landschaftspflege. Der August-Euler-Flugplatz in Darmstadt/Griesheim, Darmstadt: Wissenschaftliche Buchgesellschaft, 2008, pp. 209–239.
- Wendtland, Karlheinz: Geliebter Kintopp. Sämtliche deutsche Spielfilme von 1929-1945, mit zahlreichen Künstlerbiographien. Vol. Jahrgang 1933 und 1934, Berlin: Self-published, 1986.
