= The Impostor (1944 German film) =

1944 film directed by Karl Anton

- Directed by: Karl Anton
- Written by: Harald G. Petersson
- Produced by: Robert Wüllner; Karl Anton
- Starring: Sybille Schmitz; Karl Ludwig Diehl; Will Dohm
- Cinematography: Eduard Hoesch
- Edited by: Johanna Meisel
- Music by: Franz Doelle
- Production company: Tobis Film
- Distributed by: Deutsche Filmvertriebs
- Release date: 7 January 1944
- Running time: 81 minutes
- Country: Germany
- Language: German

The Impostor (German: Die Hochstaplerin) is a 1944 German comedy film directed by Karl Anton and starring Sybille Schmitz, Karl Ludwig Diehl and Will Dohm. It was shot at the Johannisthal Studios in Berlin. The film's sets were designed by the art director Robert A. Dietrich.

== Synopsis ==
Attractive Thea runs up large debts at the casino which she is unable to pay. She is instead recruited by the management to play the role of a seductive countess and lure customers to the casino to gamble.

== Cast ==
- Sybille Schmitz as Thea Varèn
- Karl Ludwig Diehl as Michael Jürgens
- Will Dohm as Direktor Bendag
- Elsa Wagner as Gräfin Anastasia
- Fritz Wagner as Dieter Brenken
- Erich Fiedler as Etagenkellner
- Franz Pfeiffer as Empfangschef
- Hans Stiebner as Wiezell
- Rudolf Schündler as Junger Mann
- Rello Marlo as Junge Frau
- Angelo Ferrari as Berufsspieler
- Norbert Rohringer as Kurt, Page
- Walter Lieck as Geschäftsführer

== Bibliography ==
- Bock, Hans-Michael & Bergfelder, Tim. The Concise CineGraph. Encyclopedia of German Cinema. Berghahn Books, 2009.
- Klaus, Ulrich J. Deutsche Tonfilme: Jahrgang 1944. Klaus-Archiv, 2006.
