= Herbert Engelsing =

German lawyer and resistance fighter (1904–1962)

- Herbert Engelsing as a young judge
- Born: 2 September 1904; Overath, German Empire
- Died: 10 February 1962 (aged 57); Konstanz, West Germany
- Occupations: Lawyer, film producer
- Employer(s): Tobis Film company, UFA GmbH
- Spouse: Ingeborg Engelsing née Kohler
- Children: Tobias Engelsing

Herbert Enke Wilhelm Engelsing (born 2 September 1904 in Overath, died 10 February 1962 in Konstanz) was a right-wing German Catholic lawyer in Berlin and resistance fighter against the Nazi regime. When the Nazi regime began, Engelsing found himself unable to work in law. Instead he found work in the German film industry, becoming a very successful film producer with Tobis Film. In 1938, Engelsing and his wife Ingeborg became close friends with Libertas and Harro Schulze-Boysen who were part of a resistance organisation against the Nazis. Engelsing maintained a high profile in the film business and low profile in the resistance, but made his mark by introducing many new people into the organisation, brokering deals and providing secure locations for meetings. The couple survived the war and moved to the United States in 1947. Engelsing did not receive permanent residency due to false accusations of being the head of a Soviet sleeper cell.

== Life ==
Engelsing studied law, literature and art history and earned a doctorate in law.

In 1938, Engelsing married Ingeborg Engelsing née Kohler. Kohler came from a prominent Berlin based legal family. The couple were engaged in 1936, however Kohler was classified as half-Jewish or Mischling, a pejorative term. When she went for her race characteristics exam, and although the photographer attempted to portray her as tall, blond and slim, she was refused permission to marry. The couple began to look for help and received it, in the form of the actor Käthe Dorsch. Dorsch was a childhood friend of Hermann Göring and through her advocacy managed to persuade Goring to present the couple's case to Hitler. Finally in September 1937, permission was received from Hitler and the couple married in England. The couple had a son, Thomas (16 August 1938) and a daughter, Catherine (9 September 1941).

Beginning in 1943, the couple began to change their address, moving numerous times over the next two years, so that Ingeborg wasn't drafted into a Reich women's work unit (Berufsausbildungsprogramm Ost). These women's work units were introduced by the Reich Minister of the Economy Walther Funk in 1943 and would have meant Ingeborg being assigned to a farming unit in occupied Poland.

== Career ==
In 1935, he became a lawyer at the Tobis Film company, after the Nazis took over the courts. When Tobis was purged by the Nazis he was offered a position in 1937 as a director of production groups (Herstellungs-Gruppenleiter) that involved retraining. Engelsing retained the right to practice as a lawyer, by joining the firm of Carl Langbehn, a well known and prominent law firm.

He was responsible for distribution the films, such as Willi Forst's upbeat comedy Tomfoolery (Allotria) produced in 1936. He held a similar position at several film companies until the end of the war in 1945. Engelsing's films include the Forst productions Serenade (1937) and the 1939 film Bel Ami, but also the Nazi propaganda films The Fox of Glenarvon (Der Fuchs von Glenarvon), My Life for Ireland (Mein Leben für Irland) and Jakko. Between 1937 and 1944, Engelsing was executive producer on thirty-four films. He was sufficiently successful to maintain his own division in 1942 when Tobis Films lost its independence when it was merged with Terra, Bavaria Film and Wien-Film to form UFA GmbH by the Nazis.

Engelsing friends included the actors Heinz Rühmann and Theo Lingen Engelsing was close to many members of the Babelsberg film community, the home of the Babelsberg Studio. Many of them opposed the Nazis and worked to help the victims of the regime.

== Resistance ==
Both Herbert and Ingeborg Engelsing were anti-Nazis who were active during the war in resisting the Nazis. They collected and distributed food to dispossessed Jews and other people who didn't possess ration-cards and identity papers. In 1938, the Engelsings met the couple Harro Schulze-Boysen and Libertas Schulze-Boysen at a party, held by a mutual friend. From that point forward they became good friends and began to meet frequently. Ingeborg became particularly close friends with Libertas, who confided in her about her slightly scandalous past; about her mother running away with her art tutor and her parents divorcing. Ingeborg was largely kept in the dark about the groups resistance activities, as being both a young mother and Jewish made her particularly vulnerable.

In 1939, the Engelsing's introduced Maria Terwiel and her future fiancé Helmut Himpel into the group. Himpel had been the Engelsings family dentist for a number of years. His work was so good that Engelsing had recommended him to his film friends and that led to him to build a career as a dentist to German film stars. Engelsing also introduced the industrialist Hugo Buschmann to the group. Buschmann, an ardent anti-nazi, rented one of Engelsings apartments, in the house at 2 Bettinastraße in Grunewald that the Engelsings moved into in 1939.

In 1940, Adam and Greta Kuckhoff met Harro and Libertas Schulze-Boysen at the home of the Engelsing's. In 12–13 May 1940, the couple spent the weekend at Liebenberg castle, the family home of Libertas Schulze-Boysen, where they were joined by the Schumachers, Günther Weisenborn and other friends in the group. During the weekend, the group discussed writing leaflets and formulated a method of distributing them. After the war Weisenborn stated of Engelsing, who was familiar with film and political figures, tolerated our work and encouraged it wherever he could. He was a so-called contact man, which means that our organization used the connections he had with key figures in the Third Reich. In early 1941, when Schulze-Boysen began to spy for the Soviet Union, Engelsing broke of their friendship, as he believed it was an act of betrayal.

At the end of the war, he had made his last entertainment film with director Gustav Fröhlich on the island of Mainau on Lake Constance in the summer of 1944, and brought his family from Berlin to safety on Lake Constance.

In the spring of 1945, agents of the CIC, the intelligence service of the US Army, operating out of Zurich, contacted Engelsing and used him as a source of information on members of the Nazi state. At the beginning of 1950, Engelsing made himself available as a witness in the preliminary proceedings against the then representative of the prosecution in the "Red Orchestra Trial", the Nazi apologist and General Judge Manfred Roeder. However, the proceedings were discontinued.

== After the war ==
Before the end of the war, Engelsing moved from Berlin to Konstanz at the time in the French occupation zone in Germany. Engelsing was admitted to the bar of the French military courts in 1945, where he was one of two lawyers admitted to practice. In the fall of 1945 was employed by the Konstanz district court. He ran a criminal and civil law practice. In addition to the usual mandates, he also represented victims of Nazi Aryanization as well as German and French Sinti families in restitution proceedings. He also took on mandates for some former southwest German military economic leaders in denazification proceedings.

In March 1947, Ingeborg emigrated with her family to Berkeley, California, where Ingeborg's parents had moved to in 1939 and immediately applied for American citizenship. Herbert arrived in the United States in December 1947. Attempts by Herbert to regain a foothold there in the film business failed. Engelsing remained a lawyer until his untimely death in 1962.

== Filmography ==
The following is a list of films that were produced by Engelsing:

- 1937: Don't Promise Me Anything (Versprich mir nichts)
- 1937: Another World (Andere Welt)
- 1937: Der Katzensteg
- 1937: Capers
- 1937: Serenade
- 1937: The Roundabouts of Handsome Karl (Die Umwege des schönen Karl)
- 1938: Covered Tracks (Verwehte Spuren)
- 1938: Dir gehört mein Herz
- 1939: Bel Ami
- 1940: The Fox of Glenarvon (Der Fuchs von Glenarvon)
- 1940: The Three Codonas (Die 3 Codonas)
- 1941: Jakko
- 1941: My Life for Ireland (Mein Leben für Irland)
- 1941: The Night in Venice
- 1941: Der Fall Rainer
- 1942: Der große Schatten
- 1942: My Friend Josephine
- 1943: Kohlhiesel's Daughters (Kohlhiesels Töchter)
- 1943: Light of Heart
- 1943: Herr Sanders lebt gefährlich
- 1944: Harald Arrives at Nine
- 1944: Philharmonic
- 1944: The Years Pass
- 1945: Leb’ wohl, Christina (unvollendet)
- 1945: Der Scheiterhaufen (unvollendet)
- 1948: An Everyday Story (Eine alltägliche Geschichte)
- 1949: Ruf an das Gewissen

== Literature ==
- Weniger, Kay (2001). Das große Personenlexikon des Films die Schauspieler, Regisseure, Kameraleute, Produzenten, Komponisten, Drehbuchautoren, Filmarchitekten, Ausstatter, Kostümbildner, Cutter, Tontechniker, Maskenbildner und Special Effects Designer des 20. Jahrhunderts [The great encyclopedia of film the actors, directors, cinematographers, producers, composers, screenwriters, art directors/production designers, set decorators, costume designers, editors, sound engineers, make-up artists and special effects designers of the 20th century] (in German). Vol. 2: C – F. Berlin: Schwarzkopf & Schwarzkopf. p. 558. ISBN 9783896023407.
- Roloff, Stefan; Vigl, Mario (2002). Die Rote Kapelle : die Widerstandsgruppe im Dritten Reich und die Geschichte Helmut Roloffs [The Red Orchestra: the resistance group in the Third Reich and the story of Helmut Roloff] (in German). Munic: Ullstein Taschenbuchvlg Verlag. ISBN 9783550075438.
- Kettelhake, Silke (2014). Erzähl allen, allen von mir : Das schöne kurze Leben der Libertas Schulze-Boysen 1913-1942 [Tell everyone, everyone about me : the beautiful short life of Libertas Schulze-Boysen 1913-1942.] (in German). München: Buch & media. ISBN 9783869065618.
- Malek-Kohler, Ingeborg (1986). Im Windschatten des Dritten Reiches : Begegnungen mit Filmkünstlern und Widerstandskämpfern [In the slipstream of the Third Reich : encounters with film artists and resistance fighters]. Herderbücherei, Bd. 1288 (in German). Freiburg: Herder. OCLC 1086306336.
- Verhoeven, Michael (2005). Paul, ich und wir : die Zeit und die Verhoevens [Paul, me and us : time and the Verhoevens] (in German). Berlin: Ullstein. ISBN 9783550078606.
