= By a Silken Thread =

1938 film directed by Robert A. Stemmle

- Directed by: Robert A. Stemmle
- Written by: Eberhard Frowein (novel); Robert A. Stemmle
- Produced by: Bruno Duday
- Starring: Willy Fritsch; Carl Kuhlmann; Käthe von Nagy
- Cinematography: Franz Weihmayr
- Edited by: Axel von Werner
- Music by: Herbert Windt
- Production company: UFA
- Distributed by: UFA
- Release date: 23 September 1938
- Running time: 92 minutes
- Country: Germany
- Language: German

By a Silken Thread (German: Am seidenen Faden) is a 1938 German drama film directed by Robert A. Stemmle and starring Willy Fritsch, Carl Kuhlmann and Käthe von Nagy. The film was intended to be an exposure of "crooked Jewish capitalists" in line with Nazi racial policy of the era. It was shot at the Babelsberg Studios of UFA in Potsdam. The film's sets were designed by the art director Otto Hunte.

== Cast ==
- Willy Fritsch as Richard Hellwerth
- Carl Kuhlmann as Wilhelm Eickhoff
- Käthe von Nagy as Lissy Eickhoff
- Stella David as Wirtschafterin Frida Mann
- Bernhard Minetti as Dr. Heinrich Breuer
- Erich Ponto as Theodor Kalbach
- Willi Schur as Werkmeister Schwafels
- Paul Bildt as Bankier Brögelmann
- Eduard Wandrey as Justizrat Bellert
- Hildegard Barko as Dienstmädchen Anna
- Ina Albrecht as Gast bei Eickhoffs Fest
- Johanna Blum as Gast bei Eickhoffs Fest
- Hildegard Busse as Gast bei Eickhoffs Fest
- Alfred Karen as Gast bei Eickhoffs Fest
- Ethel Reschke as Gast bei Eickhoffs Fest
- Rudolf Schündler as Von Tettenboom
- Peter Elsholtz as Passagier auf dem Rückkehrschiff
- Robert Forsch as Passagier auf dem Rückkehrschiff
- Vera Hartegg as Passagier auf dem Rückkehrschiff
- Walter Schramm-Duncker as Passagier auf dem Rückkehrschiff
- Erich Bartels as Reisender im Zugabteil
- Brunhilde Födisch as Reisende im Zugabteil
- Ursula Zeitz as Dienstmädchen bei Eickhoffs Fest
- Adolf Fischer as Arbeiter bei Hellwerth
- Wolfgang Staudte as Arbeiter bei Hellwerth
- Hans Sobierayski as Polizist, der Lizzy abführt
- Clemens Hasse as Polizist bei der Razzia
- Hellmuth Passarge as Polizist bei der Razzia
- Illo Gutschwager as Arbeiter bei der Firma Hellwerth
- Wera Schultz as Gast bei Eickhoffs Fest
- Werner Pledath as Polizeikommissar bei der Verhaftung
- Georg H. Schnell as Dr. Klipper
- Hermann Pfeiffer as Büring
- Wilfried Seyferth as Verkäufer der Firma Hellwerth
- Fritz Klaudius as Herr Kundmann
- Eduard Bornträger as Fabrikant
- Eric Harden as Fabrikant
- Hermann Meyer-Falkow as Fabrikant
- Hans Timerding as Fabrikant
- Alfred Heynisch as Begleiter Eickhoffs bei der Hochzeitstafel
- Erik von Loewis as Begleiter Eickhoffs bei der Hochzeitstafel
- Franz Weilhammer as Begleiter Eickhoffs bei der Hochzeitstafel
- Liesl Eckardt as Beschäftigte an den neuen Maschinen
- Karl Morvilius as Beschäftigter an den neuen Maschinen
- Albert Venohr as Beschäftigter an den neuen Maschinen
- Hildegard Friebel as Büroangestellte bei Hellwerth
- Hildegard Unger as Büroangestellte bei Hellwerth
- Alfred Pussert as Diener Eickhoffs
- Otto F. Henning as Vorsitzender des Arbeitsgerichts
- Kurt Klotz-Oberland as Jurist bei der Gerichtssitzung
- F.W. Schröder-Schrom as Jurist bei der Gerichtssitzung
- Walter Kunkel as Young lawyer
- Kurt Waitzmann as Young lawyer
- Inge Conradi as Frl. Fichtner
- Karl Fisser
- Käthe Jöken-König
- Hellmuth Lang
- Kurt Weisse

== Production ==
By a Silken Thread was directed by Robert A. Stemmle and produced by UFA.

== Release ==
It was banned from being shown in Germany by the Allied High Commission after World War II.

== Works cited ==
- Kelson, John (1996). Catalogue of Forbidden German Feature and Short Film Productions held in Zonal Film Archives of Film Section, Information Services Division, Control Commission for Germany, (BE) (2 ed.). Greenwood Publishing Group. ISBN 0948911190.
