= An Everyday Story =

1948 film

- Directed by: Günther Rittau
- Written by: Johannes von Spallart (play); Harald G. Petersson
- Produced by: Herbert Engelsing
- Starring: Gustav Fröhlich; Marianne Simson; Karl Schönböck
- Cinematography: Georg Bruckbauer
- Edited by: Lilian Seng
- Music by: Hans-Otto Borgmann
- Production companies: Tobis Film; DEFA
- Distributed by: Sovexport-Film
- Release date: 26 November 1948
- Running time: 84 minutes
- Country: Germany
- Language: German

An Everyday Story (German: Eine alltägliche Geschichte) is a 1948 drama film directed by Günther Rittau and starring Gustav Fröhlich, Marianne Simson and Karl Schönböck. The film was produced in 1944, towards the end of the Second World War, but was not given a release until DEFA in the Soviet Zone distributed it four years later. It received its Austrian release the following year, and eventually went into distribution in West Germany in 1950.

The film's sets were designed by the art director Otto Hunte and Karl Vollbrecht.

== Synopsis ==
A novelist completes what he considers to be his masterpiece, but the publisher tells him to write an everyday story instead.

== Cast ==
- Gustav Fröhlich as Bernd Falkenhagen
- Marianne Simson as Anneliese Schwarz
- Karl Schönböck as Herbert Winkler
- Margot Jahnen as Susi Liebig
- Hans Brausewetter as Werner, Direktor Exzelsior-Verlag
- Paul Henckels as Spaziergänger
- Hans Leibelt as Annelieses Vater
- Käthe Haack
- Oscar Sabo as Portier Wudicke
- Gerda Danker as Sekretärin
- Armin Schweizer
- Karl Etlinger as Hausnachbar
- Hildegard Grethe as Annelieses Mutter
- Karl Ludwig Schreiber as Gast

== See also ==
- Überläufer

== Bibliography ==
- Bock, Hans-Michael & Bergfelder, Tim. The Concise Cinegraph: Encyclopaedia of German Cinema. Berghahn Books, 2009.
