= Anneliese Uhlig =

German actress (1918–2017)

- Born: 27 August 1918; Essen, German Empire
- Died: 17 June 2017 (aged 98); Santa Cruz, California, U.S.
- Occupation: Actress
- Years active: 1937–1998

Anneliese Uhlig (27 August 1918 – 17 June 2017) was a German-born film actress.

Uhlig made her film debut in 1937, and went on to appear in a number of leading roles in Germany cinema during the Nazi era. She was also one of a number of foreign figures to appear in Italian films during the era. After the war she married an American, lived in the United States and in South East Asia, and worked as a journalist and lecturer. Uhlig died in June 2017 at the age of 98.

== Filmography ==
Year	Title	Role	Notes
1937	Manege	Maria Morell	
1938	Stimme des Blutes		
1939	Die Stimme aus dem Äther	Brigitte von Gersdorf	
1939	The Curtain Falls	Alice Souchy	
1939	The Right to Love	Melanie v. Salurn, seine Tochter	
1939	Ursula Under Suspicion	Pflegetochter Monika	
1940	Commissioner Eyck	Barbara Sydow	
1940	Golowin geht durch die Stadt	Madeleine	
1940	Herz ohne Heimat	Verena Wieland, Musikstudentin	
1941	Blutsbrüderschaft	Krankenschwester Barbara	
1942	Don Cesare di Bazan	Renée Dumas	
1943	Mater dolorosa	Maria di Santafiore	
1943	Tempesta sul golfo	Lady Emma Winton	
1943	The Master of the Estate	Julia Dahl	
1943	La primadonna	Ippolita Schramm	
1944	Harald Arrives at Nine	Rechtsanwältin Dr. Reinhardt	
1944	La Fornarina	Leonora d'Este	
1945	Anna Alt	Anna Alt, eine Pianistin	
1945	Das Mädchen Juanita	Helene Henseling	
1949	The Appeal to Conscience	Senora de la Serna	
1953	As Long as You're Near Me		
1956	Dany, bitte schreiben Sie	Helen Turner	
1973-1974	Okay S.I.R.	S.I.R.	32 episodes
1974	The Moonstone	Lady Julia Verinder	2 episodes

== Bibliography ==
- Brunetta, Gian Piero. The History of Italian Cinema: A Guide to Italian Film from Its Origins to the Twenty-first Century. Princeton University Press, 2009.
- Goble, Alan. The Complete Index to Literary Sources in Film. Walter de Gruyter, 1999.
