= Walter Lieck =

German actor (1906–1944)

- Born: 16 June 1906; Berlin, German Empire
- Died: 21 November 1944 (aged 38); Berlin, Nazi Germany
- Occupations: Actor, screenwiter
- Years active: 1934-1944 (film)

Walter Lieck (1906–1944) was a German stage and film actor. He played supporting roles in German cinema during the Nazi era. He was also a playwright and occasional screenwriter. He earned the disapproval of the Nazi regime for refusing to divorce his half-Jewish wife . He was imprisoned for two months at Esterwegen concentration camp.

== Selected filmography ==
- The Two Seals (1934)
- Dangerous Crossing (1937)
- Congo Express (1939)
- Renate in the Quartet (1939)
- Her First Experience (1939)
- Man for Man (1939)
- The Sensational Casilla Trial (1939)
- Wibbel the Tailor (1939)
- Robert and Bertram (1939)
- Kitty and the World Conference (1939)
- My Aunt, Your Aunt (1939)
- Small Town Poet (1940)
- Twilight (1940)
- Commissioner Eyck (1940)
- Between Hamburg and Haiti (1940)
- The Three Codonas (1940)
- Riding for Germany (1941)
- The Gasman (1941)
- Annelie (1941)
- Destiny (1942)
- The Night in Venice (1942)
- Doctor Crippen (1942)
- Light of Heart (1943)
- Romance in a Minor Key (1943)
- Münchhausen (1943)
- The Bath in the Barn (1943)
- Mask in Blue (1943)
- The Impostor (1944)
- Dog Days (1944)

== Bibliography ==
- Weniger, Kay. Zwischen Bühne und Baracke: Lexikon der verfolgten Theater-, Film- und Musikkünstler 1933 bis 1945. Metropol, 2008.
