= Woman Made to Measure =

1940 film directed by Helmut Käutner

- Directed by: Helmut Käutner
- Written by: Helmut Käutner
- Based on: Woman Made to Measure by Erich Kästner
- Produced by: Hans Tost
- Starring: Hans Söhnker; Leny Marenbach; Dorit Kreysler
- Cinematography: Walter Pindter
- Edited by: Wolfgang Wehrum
- Music by: Norbert Schultze
- Production company: Terra Film
- Distributed by: Terra Film
- Release date: 14 June 1940
- Running time: 94 minutes
- Country: Germany
- Language: German

Woman Made to Measure (German: Frau nach Maß) is a 1940 German comedy film directed by Helmut Käutner and starring Hans Söhnker, Leny Marenbach and Dorit Kreysler. Produced by Terra Film, it was shot at the Babelsberg Studios in Berlin. The film's sets were designed by the art director Willi Herrmann. It was based on the play of the same title by Erich Kästner.

== Cast ==
- Hans Söhnker as Christian Bauer
- Leny Marenbach as Annemarie / Rosemarie
- Dorit Kreysler as Fräulein Zettlund
- Fritz Odemar as Dr. Paul Buchmann
- Hilde Hildebrand as Hermine Campe
- Walter Steinbeck as Theaterdirektor Julius Campe
- Hugo Schrader as Dr. Gärtner
- Hermann Pfeiffer as Richard Höllenkamp
- Ursula Herking as Hausmädchen Anna
- Alice Treff as Fräulein Mümmelmann
- Erika von Thellmann as Dame im Wartezimmer
- Tibor Halmay as Birkbusch
- Hadrian Maria Netto as Prof. Häberfeld
- Wilhelm Groothe as Toni
- Wilhelm Bendow as Schmott
- Margarete Kupfer as Tante Rose
- Charly Berger as Ein wartender Mann am Standesamt
- Wilhelm Egger-Sell as Mann am Standesamt mit dem guten Rat
- Angelo Ferrari as Christians Sitznachbar in der Theaterloge
- Aribert Grimmer as Frischgebackener Ehemann am Standesamt
- Karl Harbacher as Die Violine im Orchester
- Charlie Kracker as Bühnenarbeiter
- Paul Mehler as Junger Mann am Standesamt mit den Zwillingen
- Armin Münch as Standesbeamter
- Ewald Wenck as Theaterinspizient

== Bibliography ==
- Hull, David Stewart. Film in the Third Reich: A Study of the German Cinema, 1933–1945. University of California Press, 1969.
