= Hansi Wendler =

German actress

- Born: 1 May 1912
- Died: 12 December 2010 (aged 98); Munich, Germany
- Occupation: Actress
- Years active: 1939–1952 (film)

Hansi Wendler (1912–2010) was a German film actress.

== Selected filmography ==
- Men Are That Way (1939)
- Man for Man (1939)
- Two Worlds (1940)
- Two in a Big City (1942)
- The Night in Venice (1942)
- Light of Heart (1943)
- A Flea in Her Ear (1943)
- I'll Carry You in My Arms (1943)
- Why Are You Lying, Elisabeth? (1944)
- The Lost One (1951)

== Bibliography ==
- Goble, Alan. The Complete Index to Literary Sources in Film. Walter de Gruyter, 1999.
