= The Swedish Nightingale (film) =

1941 film

- Directed by: Peter Paul Brauer
- Written by: Friedrich Forster (play); Henry Lemarchand; Per Schwenzen; Gert von Klaß
- Produced by: Ernst Günter Techow
- Starring: Ilse Werner; Karl Ludwig Diehl; Joachim Gottschalk; Aribert Wäscher
- Cinematography: Ewald Daub
- Edited by: Alice Ludwig
- Music by: Franz Grothe
- Production company: Terra Film
- Distributed by: Terra Film
- Release date: 9 April 1941
- Running time: 97 minutes
- Country: Germany
- Language: German

The Swedish Nightingale (German: Die schwedische Nachtigall) is a 1941 German musical film directed by Peter Paul Brauer and starring Ilse Werner (singing sequences with Erna Berger's voice), Karl Ludwig Diehl, and Joachim Gottschalk. The film is based on a play by Friedrich Forster-Burggraf set in nineteenth century Copenhagen. It portrays a romance between the writer Hans Christian Andersen and the opera singer Jenny Lind, the "Swedish Nightingale" of the title.

It was shot at the Terra Studios in Berlin. The film's sets were designed by the art directors Robert Herlth and Heinrich Weidemann. Made on a budget of around one and half million Reichsmarks, it was a major commercial success on its release across Europe.

At the time when the film was made, Germany was keeping Denmark under military occupation but attempting a relatively conciliatory attitude towards the occupied Danes. Germany was also making an effort to keep good relations with the neutral Sweden. The theme of the film – made at a time when Joseph Goebbels' Propaganda Ministry kept tight control of the German film industry – fit well with these policy aims.

== Cast ==
- Ilse Werner as Jenny Lind
- Karl Ludwig Diehl as Count Rantzau
- Joachim Gottschalk as Hans Christian Andersen
- Aribert Wäscher as Peer Upän
- Marianne Simson as Karin Nielsson
- Hans Leibelt as Theatre Director
- Emil Heß as Thorwaldsen
- Hans Hermann Schaufuß as Orchestra Conductor
- Volker von Collande as Olaf Larsson
- Kate Kühl as Frl. Rindom, Sängerin
- Ruth Lommel as Eine Debütantin
- Elga Brink as Gräfin Ebba Douglas
- Erich Dunskus as Postmeister
- Angelo Ferrari as Italienischer Gastwirt
- Werner Stock as Prinz Schweinehirt
- Jakob Tiedtke as Kaiser
- Wilfried Seyferth as Hofjunker
- Alwin Lippisch as Leibarzt
- Charlotte Schellhorn as Küchenmädchen
- Ernst Sattler as Axel Lind
- Jeanette Bethge as Frau Tostrup, Andersens Haushälterin
- Siegfried von Geldern as Tenor
- Erwin Hoffmann as Ballettmeister
- Walter Bechmann as Theatersekretär
- Franz Stein as Hofuhrmacher
- Bernhard Goetzke as Tod
- Erna Berger as Solostimme und Stimme der Nachtigall
- Lillie Claus as Singer
- France Clery as Singer
- Karl Hellmer
- Rudolf Schündler
- Ingeborg Albert
- Curt Cappi
- Elsa Andrä Beyer
- Franz Arzdorf
- Max Dietze
- Irene Fischer
- Gustl Kreusch
- Peter C. Leska
- Willy Melas
- Hans Reiners
- Ernst Rotmund
- Otto Sauter-Sarto
- Karl Wagner
- Hanns Waschatko
- Bruno Ziener

== Bibliography ==
- Hake, Sabine (2001). Popular Cinema of the Third Reich. Austin: University of Texas Press. ISBN 978-0-292-73458-6.
