= Volker von Collande =

German actor

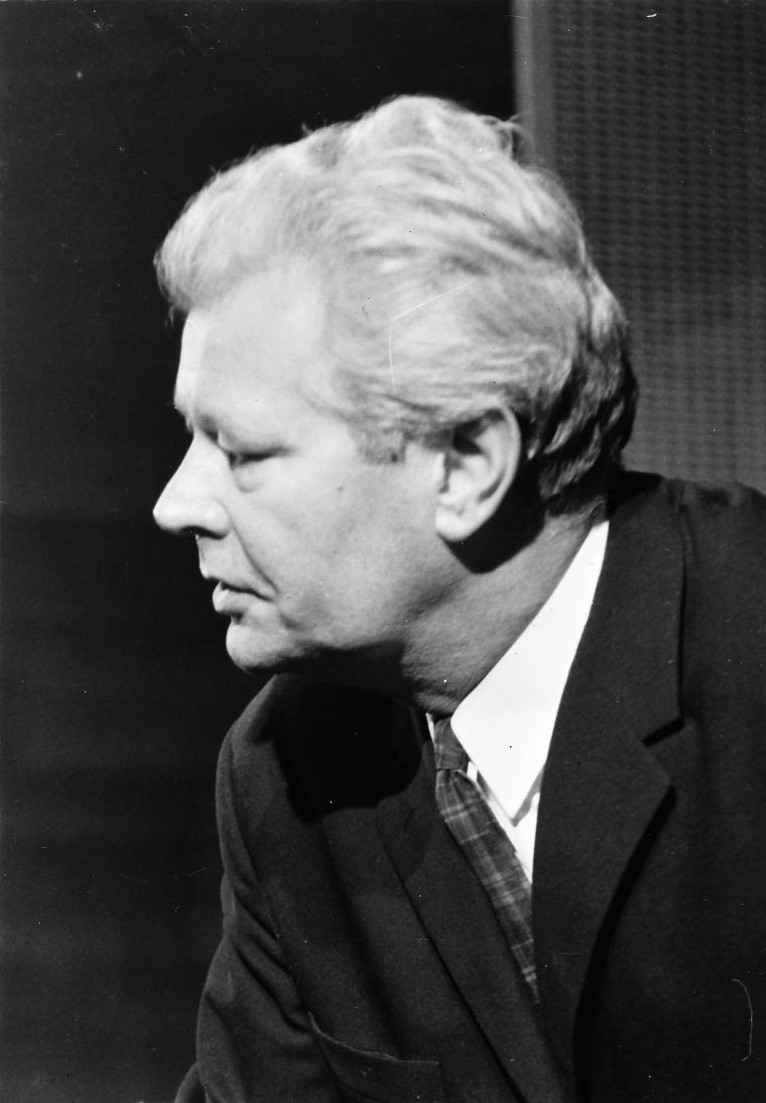
- Volker von Collande in 1968
- Born: 21 November 1913; Dresden, German Empire
- Died: 29 October 1990 (aged 76); Hannover, Germany
- Occupations: Actor; Film director
- Years active: 1934–1987

Volker von Collande (21 November 1913 – 29 October 1990) was a German actor and film director. He appeared in more than 40 films between 1934 and 1987. He also directed more than 20 films between 1942 and 1967. Collande was a member of the Nazi Party.

== Selected filmography ==
=== Actor ===
- Rivalen der Luft (1934) - Hanne aus Hamburg, Flugschüler
- Hermine and the Seven Upright Men (1935)
- The Student of Prague (1935) - Zavrel
- The Higher Command (1935) - Bürger
- Winter in the Woods (1936) - Hartwig, Glasbläster
- The Traitor (1936) - Referendar Kröpke
- Thunder, Lightning and Sunshine (1936) - Andreas, sein Sohn
- Togger (1937) - Redakteur Hallmann
- Capers (1937) - William Baxter
- Das Ehesanatorium (1938) - Stephan Seidlitz
- Eine Frau kommt in die Tropen (1938) - Herbert - sein Bruder
- Schwarzfahrt ins Glück (1938) - Automechaniker Hanne Schmidt
- Target in the Clouds (1939) - Ewald Menzel
- The Curtain Falls (1939) - Rapp
- A Woman Like You (1939) - Ingenieur Wallrodt
- Her First Experience (1939) - Jochen
- Polterabend (1940) - Thomas
- Kopf hoch, Johannes! (1941) - Zugführer Dr. Angermann
- Männerwirtschaft (1941) - Hinnerk - Bauer
- The Swedish Nightingale (1941) - Olaf Larsson
- Two in a Big City (1942) - Dr. Eberhard Berg
- Fritze Bollmann wollte angeln (1943) - Volker von Collande
- Wild Bird (1943) - Wolff
- A Beautiful Day (1944) - Fritz Schröder
- Eine kleine Sommermelodie (1944) - Oberleutnant Arnold Kersten
- Unknown Sender (1950) - Fredy Brown
- Thirteen Under One Hat (1950) - Wolfgang Huth
- Abundance of Life (1950) - Sarghändler
- Immortal Light (1951) - René Garnier
- Wild West in Upper Bavaria (1951) - Hans - Gestütsverwalter
- I'm Waiting for You (1952) - Kinderarzt Dr. Born
- Rebellion (1954) - Carlos Maraga
- Captain Wronski (1954) - Major Kegel

=== Director ===
- Two in a Big City (1942)
- The Bath in the Barn (1943)
- I'm Waiting for You (1952)
- Hochzeit auf Immenhof (1956)

=== Screenwriter ===
- How Do We Tell Our Children? (1949)
