= Twelve Hearts for Charly =

1949 film

- Directed by: Fritz Andelfinger; Elly Rauch
- Written by: Karl Georg Külb
- Starring: Willy Fritsch; Heli Finkenzeller; Dorit Kreysler
- Cinematography: Hans Hauptmann; Walter Pindter
- Edited by: Friedel Buckow
- Music by: Norbert Schultze
- Production company: Cinephon-Film
- Distributed by: Fortuna-Filmverleih
- Release date: 6 May 1949
- Running time: 96 minutes
- Language: German

Twelve Hearts for Charly (German: Zwölf Herzen für Charly) is a 1949 German musical comedy film directed by Fritz Andelfinger and Elly Rauch and starring Willy Fritsch, Heli Finkenzeller and Dorit Kreysler. It was shot at the Göttingen Studios. The film was temporarily banned in the American zone of occupation because of its perceived negative portrayal of American soldiers.

== Synopsis ==
Two twin brothers are separated at birth and one is raised in America while the other grows up in Germany. After the Second World War, the American twin arrives as part of the occupation forces and leads a jazz band in his spare time. His brother, by contrast, teaches classical music at a girls school. After accidentally meeting, the two brothers decide to switch places, leading to many comic and romantic complications.

== Cast ==
- Willy Fritsch as Dr. Wolfgang Amadeus Wagenbichler / Charly
- Heli Finkenzeller as Gabriele
- Käte Pontow as Annemarie
- Erika von Thellmann as Frau v. Auersbach
- Dorit Kreysler as Frau Eichhorn
- Penelope de Wall as Dorle, Kind
- Helga Mietzner as Maridl
- Wolf Harro as Toni, Sportlehrer
- Robert Demps as Georg Washington, Musiker
- Hans Hermann Pfeiffer as Dolmetscher

== Bibliography ==
- Bock, Hans-Michael & Bergfelder, Tim. The Concise Cinegraph: Encyclopaedia of German Cinema. Berghahn Books, 2009, Paper ISBN 978-1-57181-655-9, e-book ISBN 978-0-85745-565-9, doi:10.3167/9781571816559.
- Fay, Jennifer. Theaters of Occupation: Hollywood and the Reeducation of Postwar Germany. University of Minnesota Press, 2008. ISBN 978-0-8166-4744-6, ISBN 978-0-8166-4745-3
