= The Marriage Swindler (1938 film) =

1938 film

- Directed by: Herbert Selpin
- Written by: Gertrude Von Brockdorff (novel); Fritz Wendhausen
- Produced by: Ludwig Behrends
- Starring: Eduard von Winterstein; Viktoria von Ballasko; Kurt Waitzmann
- Cinematography: E.W. Fiedler
- Edited by: Lena Neumann
- Music by: Werner Bochmann
- Production company: A.B.C.-Film
- Distributed by: Tobis Film
- Release date: 15 February 1938
- Running time: 90 minutes
- Country: Germany
- Language: German

The Marriage Swindler (German: Heiratsschwindler) is a 1938 German drama film directed by Herbert Selpin and starring Eduard von Winterstein, Viktoria von Ballasko and Kurt Waitzmann. It is sometimes known by the alternative title Die rote Mütze (The Red Cap). The film's sets were designed by the art directors Max Knaake and Karl Vollbrecht.

== Synopsis ==
A confidence trickster is released from prison and travels to a village where he blackmails and tricks women out of their savings, before eventually being caught.

== Cast ==
- Eduard von Winterstein as Franz Buschko
- Viktoria von Ballasko as Marianne, seine Tochter
- Kurt Waitzmann as Mathias Schröder
- Harald Paulsen as Häselich / Ullmann
- Hilde Körber as Melitta Dolechal
- Fita Benkhoff as Frau Lindemann
- Elisabeth Flickenschildt as Frau Buschko
- Alfred Maack as Paaschen, Bahnhofswirt
- Heinrich Kalnberg as Vater Zierlein
- Friedrich Ettel as Vorsteher Scharrelmann
- Ernst Behmer as Pauluschkat
- Gerhard Bienert as Assistant Obermeier
- Hans Hemes as 1. Beamter
- Helmut Heyne as Assistant Fiedler
- Eva Klein-Donath as Frau Becker
- Gerda Kuffner as Frau Niemeyer
- Waldemar Potier as Kellnerjunge Karl
- Arthur Reinhardt as 2. Beamter

== Production ==
The film was directed by Selpin for the small studio A.B.C.-Film, and distributed by the major company Tobis Film. It is based on a novel by Gertrude Von Brockdorff. Its neorealism and pessimistic tone were a sharp change from Selpin's recent work which had been dominated by musicals, comedies and society dramas and was extremely rare in the Nazi era when German cinema strove to be light and entertaining. The film had trouble with the censors, and its release was delayed. It has been described as "One of the finest German sound films ever made".

== Bibliography ==
- Bergfelder, Tim; Street, Sarah, eds. (2004). The Titanic in Myth and Memory: Representations in Visual and Literary Culture. I.B. Tauris. ISBN 978-1-85043-432-0.
- Hull, David Stewart (1969). Film in the Third Reich: A Study of the German Cinema, 1933–1945. University of California Press. ISBN 978-0-520-01489-3.
