= Attack on Baku =

1942 film

- Directed by: Fritz Kirchhoff
- Written by: Hans Wolfgang Hillers; Hans Weidemann
- Produced by: Hans Weidemann
- Starring: Willy Fritsch; René Deltgen; Fritz Kampers; Hans Zesch-Ballot
- Cinematography: Robert Baberske
- Edited by: Erich Kobler
- Music by: Alois Melichar
- Production company: UFA
- Distributed by: UFA
- Release date: 25 August 1942
- Running time: 91 minutes
- Country: Germany
- Language: German

Attack on Baku (German: Anschlag auf Baku) is a 1942 German thriller film directed by Fritz Kirchhoff and starring Willy Fritsch, René Deltgen, and Fritz Kampers. The film was intended as anti-British propaganda during the Second World War. It is noted for its set designs by Otto Hunte, who showed a fascination for modern technology in his depiction of the oil town. The film was shot on location in German-allied Romania, and at Babelsberg Studio in Berlin.

== Synopsis ==
Azerbaijan, 1919. The British hope to secure control of the vast oil fields around Baku by launching a series of terrorist attacks on them. Hans Romberg, a German who is working as a security officer, battles with the British chief agent Captain Forbes and his associates.

== Cast ==
- Willy Fritsch as Hans Romberg
- René Deltgen as Captain Percy Forbes, British Chief Agent
- Fritz Kampers as Sergeant Mathias Ertl
- Hans Zesch-Ballot as Police Minister Barakoff
- Paul Bildt as Camps, U.S. oil magnate in Baku
- Lotte Koch as Sylvia, his daughter
- Erich Ponto as Jensen, Danish oil magnate
- Aribert Wascher as Mamulian, Armenian oil magnate
- Walter Janssen as Hanson, Swedish oil magnate
- Joachim Brennecke as Ali Baba
- Josef Kamper as Zolak
- Wilhelm H. König as Thatul
- Heinrich Marlow as Lord Seymour, British officer
- Hellmut Helsig as Richard Twinning, British Agent
- Alexander Enge as Steffens, British Agent
- Walter Holetzko as Richards, British Agent
- Peter Elsholtz as British Lieutenant
- Nicolas Koline as Russian waiter
- Aruth Vartan as GPU agent
- Willy Maertens as Jensen's lawyer
- Boris Alekin as Turkish officer
- Angelo Ferrari as Turkish officer
- Erik Radolf as Forbes' servant
- Herbert Gernot as Colonel Ahmed Bey
- Fred Goebel as British agent
- Reginald Pasch as British agent
- Arthur Reinhardt as British agent
- Nico Turoff as British agent
- Kurt Iller as British agent
- Karl Jüstel as British agent
- Günther Ballier as Jensen's secretary
- Herbert Scholz as Assassin
- Werner Völger as Assassin
- Peter Busse as Oil Tycoon
- Julius E. Herrmann as Oil Tycoon
- Erich Walter as Gregor
- Lotte Hermann as Dancer
- Lula Sachnowsky as Dancer

== Bibliography ==
- Hake, Sabine (2001). Popular Cinema of the Third Reich. Austin: University of Texas Press. ISBN 978-0-292-73458-6.
- Eltin, Richard A., ed. (2002). Art, Culture, and Media Under the Third Reich. Chicago: University of Chicago Press. ISBN 978-0-226-22087-1.
