= Joachim Brennecke =

German actor (1919–2011)

- Born: 6 December 1919; Berlin, Germany
- Died: 6 September 2011 (aged 91); Vaduz, Liechtenstein
- Occupations: Film actor Stage actor

Joachim Brennecke (6 December 1919 – 6 September 2011) was a German stage and film actor. During the Second World War he had prominent roles in Nazi propaganda films such as Attack on Baku and 5 June.

== Selected filmography ==
- Two Worlds (1940)
- Wunschkonzert (1940)
- Above All Else in the World (1941)
- U-Boote westwärts (1941)
- Attack on Baku (1942)
- 5 June (1942)
- Der Kahn der fröhlichen Leute (1950)
- The Guilt of Doctor Homma (1951)
- A Heidelberg Romance (1951)
- Shooting Stars (1952)
- The Day Before the Wedding (1952)
- I'm Waiting for You (1952)
- I Can't Marry Them All (1952)
- House of Life (1952)
- Such a Charade (1953)
- Scandal at the Girls' School (1953)
- The Empress of China (1953)
- The Cousin from Nowhere (1953)
- The Crazy Clinic (1954)
- Sun Over the Adriatic (1954)
- The Inn on the Lahn (1955)
- I'll See You at Lake Constance (1956)

== Bibliography ==
- Kreimeier, Klaus (1999). The Ufa Story: A History of Germany's Greatest Film Company, 1918–1945 (Reprint ed.). University of California Press. ISBN 0-520-22069-2.
- Taylor, Richard (1998). Film Propaganda: Soviet Russia and Nazi Germany (2nd rev. ed.). I.B. Tauris. ISBN 1-86064-167-9.
