= Between Hamburg and Haiti =

1940 film

- Directed by: Erich Waschneck
- Written by: Josef Maria Frank (novel); Walter Forster
- Produced by: Hermann Grund
- Starring: Gustav Knuth; Gisela Uhlen; Albert Florath
- Cinematography: Robert Baberske
- Edited by: Walter Wischniewsky
- Music by: Werner Eisbrenner
- Production company: UFA
- Distributed by: UFA
- Release date: 29 November 1940
- Running time: 91 minutes
- Country: Germany
- Language: German

Between Hamburg and Haiti (German: Zwischen Hamburg und Haiti) is a 1940 German drama film directed by Erich Waschneck and starring Gustav Knuth, Gisela Uhlen and Albert Florath.

The film's sets were designed by Ernst H. Albrecht. Location shooting took place in Hamburg.

== Synopsis ==
A German plantation owner rescues a young German woman who has been abandoned by her lover in Latin America.

== Cast ==
- Gustav Knuth as Henry Brinkmann
- Gisela Uhlen as 'Bella' Anna Wittstock
- Albert Florath as Wilm
- Walter Franck as Melchior Schlömpp alias Larsen
- Ruth Eweler as Ingeborg
- Kurt Waitzmann as Gustav Petersen
- Grethe Weiser as Kitty
- Walter Lieck as Hermann Polt
- Will Dohm as Miguel Braga
- Anneliese Kressel as Rosita
- Lea Niako as Dolores
- Michael Simo as Tänzer
- Siegfried Drost
- Erich Dunskus as Mexikanischer Hotelportier
- Angelo Ferrari as Angestellter im mexikanischen Hotel
- Bernhard Goetzke
- Erich Hecking
- Otto Kronburger
- Peter C. Leska
- Eduard Marks
- Manfred Meurer as Manuel
- Karl-Heinz Peters as Jackson
- Leo Peukert as Der deutsche Geschäftsfreund Miguels
- Ernst Rotmund
- Hans Adalbert Schlettow
- Annemarie Schreiner as Chinita
- Franz Schönemann
- Wolf Trutz
- Ernst Weiser
- Herbert Weissbach as Gast im 'Goldenen Hufeisen'
- Manny Ziener

== Bibliography ==
- Waldman, Harry (2008). Nazi Films in America, 1933–1942. Jefferson, NC: McFarland. ISBN 978-0-7864-3861-7.
