= Two in a Big City =

1942 film

- Directed by: Volker von Collande
- Written by: Ursula von Witzendorff; Volker von Collande
- Produced by: Robert Wüllner
- Starring: Claude Farell; Karl John; Marianne Simson
- Cinematography: Carl Hoffmann; Erich Nitzschmann
- Edited by: Walter von Bonhorst
- Music by: Willy Kollo
- Production company: Tobis Film
- Distributed by: Tobis Film
- Release date: 23 January 1942
- Running time: 80 minutes
- Country: Germany
- Language: German

Two in a Big City (German: Zwei in einer großen Stadt) is a 1942 German romantic comedy film directed by Volker von Collande and starring Claude Farell, Karl John and Marianne Simson. It was shot at the Johannisthal Studios in Berlin. The film's sets were designed by the art director Karl Böhm.

== Synopsis ==
A German soldier on leave in Berlin goes looking for his penfriend Giesela who he has never met. He meets a woman with the same name and falls in love with her.

== Cast ==
- Claude Farell as Gisela Meinhold
- Karl John as Bernd Birckhoff
- Marianne Simson as Inge Torff
- Hansi Wendler as Gisela Brückner
- Volker von Collande as Dr. Eberhard Berg
- Hannes Keppler as Peter Pelle
- Käthe Haack as Oberhelferin
- Paul Henckels as Bumke
- Margarete Kupfer as Frau Böhme
- Hubert von Meyerinck as Spießer
- Wolf Trutz as Ein Fremder
- Georg Haentzschel as Band Leader
- Horst Winter as Singer
- Josef Dahmen as Gesang
- Gerhard Dammann
- Cordula Grun
- Horst Lommer
- Erik Radolf
- Erna Sellmer
- Werner Stock as Gesang
- Alice Treff
- Ewald Wenck

== Bibliography ==
- Hull, David Stewart. Film in the Third Reich: A Study of the German Cinema, 1933–1945. University of California Press, 1969.
