= Viktoria von Ballasko =

Austrian actress

- Born: Viktoria Maria Franziska Ballasko; 24 January 1909; Vienna, Austria
- Died: 10 May 1976 (aged 67); Berlin, East Germany
- Occupation: actress

Viktoria von Ballasko (24 January 1909, Vienna – 10 May 1976, Berlin) was an Austrian actress.

She was born Viktoria Maria Franziska Ballasko.

== Partial filmography ==
- Der Kaiser von Kalifornien (1936) - Anna, seine Frau
- Doctor Engel (1936) - Maria Winkler
- Ball at the Metropol (1937) - Gertrude Selle
- The Citadel of Warsaw (1937) - Anna Lasotzka
- The Marriage Swindler (1938) - Marianne, seine Tochter
- Schwarzfahrt ins Glück (1938) - Privatsekretärin Trude Holm
- A Prussian Love Story (1938) - Prinzessin Auguste - ihre Tochter
- Die Geliebte (1939) - Therese
- Man for Man (1939) - Else Zügel
- Robert Koch (1939) - Schwester Else
- Kennwort Machin (1939) - Marie-Henriette Borb, genannt Mette
- Krambambuli (1940) - Anna Sonnleitner
- Herz geht vor Anker (1940) - Hanna Peters
- Im Schatten des Berges (1940) - Veronica Zumtobel
- The Girl from Fano (1941) - Ipkes Frau Angens
- Heimaterde (1941)
- My Summer Companion (1943) - Hanna Polenz, Frau des Müllers
- The Master of the Estate (1943) - Amelie von Linden
- Die unheimliche Wandlung des Alex Roscher (1943) - Grete Steinbauer, Alex' Braut
- Das Leben geht weiter (1945) - Frau Kolling
- Und wieder 48 (1948) - Betty
- Our Daily Bread (1949) - Martha Webers
- The Guilt of Doctor Homma (1951) - Karen Homma
- A Musical War of Love (1953) - Fräulein Canisius
- The Witch (1954)
- Beichtgeheimnis (1956) - Wirtschafterin
- Wolfpack (1956) - Mutter Borchert
- Made in Germany (1957) - Frau Löber (final film role)

== Bibliography ==
- Fox, Jo. Filming Women in the Third Reich. Berg, 2000.
- Hull, David Stewart. Film in the Third Reich: a study of the German cinema, 1933-1945. University of California Press, 1969.
