= Fritz Kirchhoff =

German director

- Born: 10 December 1901; Hannover, German Empire
- Died: 25 June 1953 (aged 51); Hamburg, West Germany
- Occupations: Film producer; Film director; Screenwriter
- Years active: 1937–1950 (director)

Fritz Kirchhoff (1901–1953) was a German screenwriter, film producer and director. He was a noted director during the Nazi era, directing film such as the anti-British propaganda thriller Attack on Baku (1942). His 1942 film 5 June, showing the German defeat of France in 1940, was banned by Joseph Goebbels for unclear reasons, although it has been speculated it was to avoid offending the Vichy government. After the Second World War Kirchhoff set up his own production company in Hamburg.

== Selected filmography ==
=== Director ===
- Tango Notturno (1937)
- My Friend Barbara (1937)
- When Women Keep Silent (1937)
- Shadows Over St. Pauli (1938)
- Why Are You Lying, Elisabeth? (1939)
- Three Wonderful Days (1939)
- The Eternal Spring (1940)
- Attack on Baku (1942)
- 5 June (1942)
- When the Young Wine Blossoms (1943)
- A Wife for Three Days (1944)
- One Day (1945)
- Only One Night (1950)

=== Producer ===
- The Girl from the South Seas (1950)
- Maya of the Seven Veils (1951)
- The Thief of Baghdad (1952)
- I Lost My Heart in Heidelberg (1952)
- The Colourful Dream (1952)

== Bibliography ==
- Bock, Hans-Michael; Bergfelder, Tim, eds. (2009). The Concise Cinegraph: Encyclopaedia of German Cinema. New York: Berghahn Books. ISBN 978-1-57181-655-9.
- Eltin, Richard A., ed. (2002). Art, Culture, and Media Under the Third Reich. Chicago: University of Chicago Press. ISBN 978-0-226-22087-1.
- Kreimeier, Klaus (1999). The Ufa Story: A History of Germany's Greatest Film Company, 1918–1945. Berkeley: University of California Press. ISBN 978-0-520-22069-0.
