= Will Dohm =

German actor

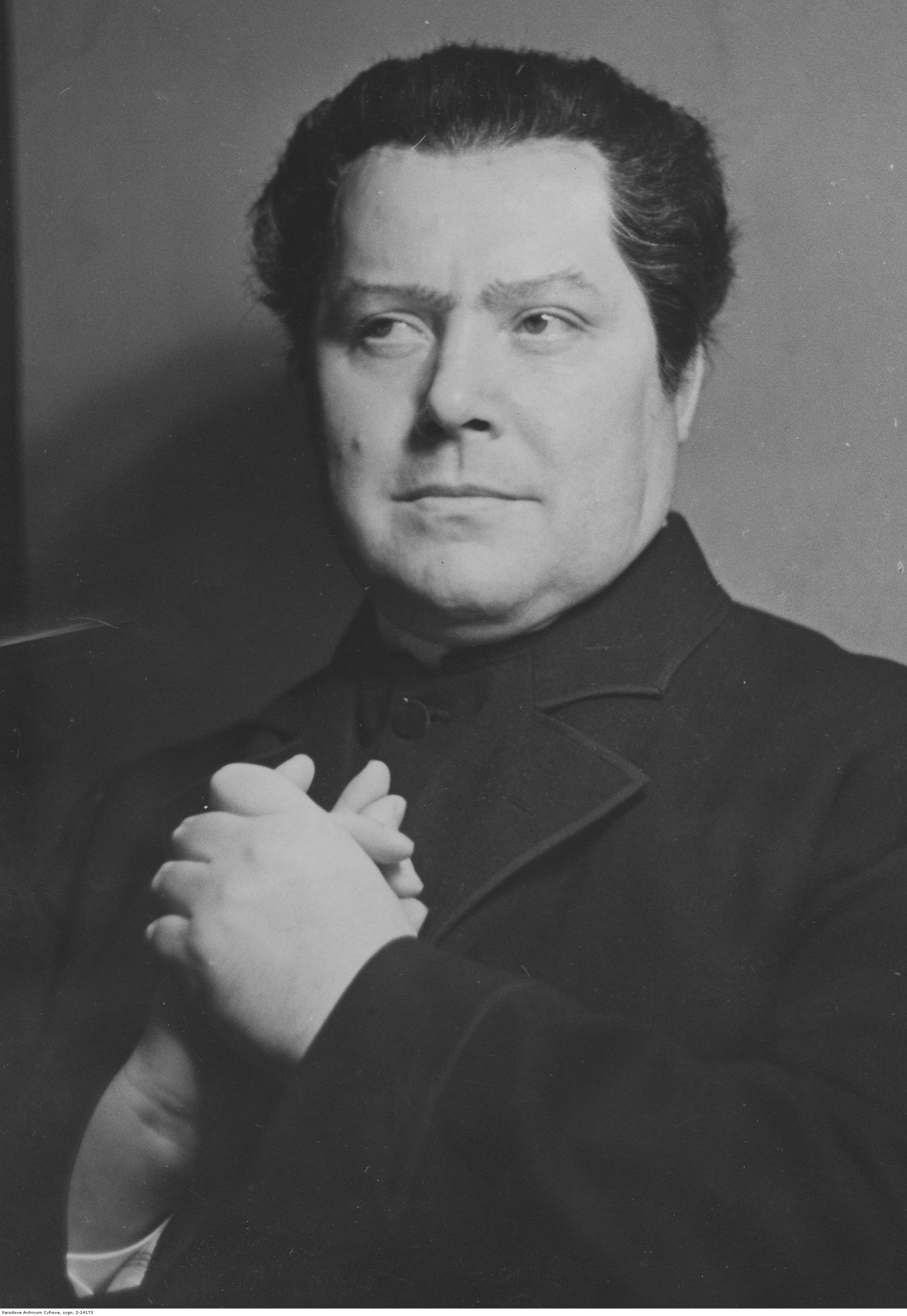
- Born: 8 April 1897; Cologne-Delbrück, German Empire
- Died: 28 November 1948 (aged 51); Munich, Germany
- Occupation: Film actor
- Years active: 1926–1946
- Spouse: Heli Finkenzeller
- Children: Gaby Dohm

Will Dohm (8 April 1897 – 28 November 1948) was a German film actor. He is the father of the actress Gaby Dohm.

== Selected filmography ==
- Waterloo (1929)
- Cruiser Emden (1932)
- Peter Voss, Thief of Millions (1932)
- The Tunnel (1933)
- The King's Prisoner (1935)
- Tomfoolery (1936)
- If We All Were Angels (1936)
- Maria the Maid (1936)
- Donogoo Tonka (1936)
- Fridericus (1937)
- Dangerous Game (1937)
- Don't Promise Me Anything (1937)
- A Prussian Love Story (1938)
- The Girl with a Good Reputation (1938)
- Dance on the Volcano (1938)
- So You Don't Know Korff Yet? (1938)
- Opera Ball (1939)
- Kora Terry (1940)
- Between Hamburg and Haiti (1940)
- Mistress Moon (1941)
- The Gasman (1941)
- Her Other Self (1941)
- Mein Leben für Irland (1941)
- The Thing About Styx (1942)
- An Old Heart Becomes Young Again (1943)
- Melody of a Great City (1943)
- Journey into the Past (1943)
- The Bath in the Barn (1943)
- A Man for My Wife (1943)
- The Song of the Nightingale (1944)
- The Master Detective (1944)
- The Impostor (1944)
- Die Fledermaus (1946)
