= Capers (1937 film) =

1937 film

- Directed by: Gustaf Gründgens
- Written by: Willi Forst; Jochen Huth
- Produced by: Herbert Engelsing; Willi Forst
- Starring: Gustaf Gründgens; Marianne Hoppe; Fita Benkhoff; Volker von Collande
- Cinematography: Kurt Neubert; Franz Planer; Walter Tuch
- Edited by: Hans Wolff
- Music by: Peter Kreuder
- Production companies: Deutsche Forst-Filmproduktion; Terra Film
- Distributed by: Terra Film
- Release date: 10 August 1937
- Running time: 90 minutes
- Country: Germany
- Language: German

Capers (German: Capriolen) is a 1937 German comedy film directed by and starring Gustaf Gründgens and also featuring Marianne Hoppe, Fita Benkhoff and Volker von Collande. It was shot at the Johannisthal Studios in Berlin. The film's sets were designed by the art directors Kurt Herlth and Werner Schlichting. It was produced and released by Terra Film while international distribution was handled by Tobis Film.

== Synopsis ==
Journalist Jack Warren is celebrated for interviewing successful women but is secretly tired of this line of work. When he encounters the actress Dorothy Hopkins, he mistakes her for the famous aviatrix Mabel Atkinson and in turn mistakes the real Mabel for somebody else.

== Cast ==
- Marianne Hoppe as Mabel Atkinson
- Gustaf Gründgens as Jack Warren
- Fita Benkhoff as Peggy MacFarland
- Maria Bard as Dorothy Hopkins
- Volker von Collande as William Baxter
- Hans Leibelt as Neville
- Franz Weber as Simpson
- Max Gülstorff as Rechtsanwalt
- Paul Henckels as Rechtsanwalt
- Albert Florath as Der Richter
- Elsa Wagner as Dame beim Zahnarzt
- Eva Tinschmann as Zimmervermieterin
- Erich Dunskus as Schornsteinfeger
- Otto Graf as Zahnarzt
- Walter Gross as Bildberichterstatter
- Clemens Hasse as Funker
- Erika Streithorst as Assistantin
- Ernst Behmer as Pfarrer
- Wolf Trutz as Herr beim Zahnarzt

== Bibliography ==
- Bock, Hans-Michael & Bergfelder, Tim. The Concise CineGraph. Encyclopedia of German Cinema. Berghahn Books, 2009.
- Hake, Sabine. German National Cinema. Routledge, 2002.
- Loacker, Armin. Willi Forst: ein Filmstil aus Wien. Filmarchiv Austria, 2003.
- Rentschler, Eric. The Ministry of Illusion: Nazi Cinema and Its Afterlife. Harvard University Press, 1996.
