= The Citadel of Warsaw (1937 film) =

1937 film

- Directed by: Fritz Peter Buch
- Written by: Fritz Peter Buch; Alfred Mühr
- Based on: Tamten by Gabriela Zapolska
- Produced by: Hans Lehmann
- Starring: Lucie Höflich; Werner Hinz; Viktoria von Ballasko
- Cinematography: Bruno Mondi
- Edited by: Ludolf Grisebach
- Music by: Werner Bochmann
- Production company: A.B.C.-Film
- Distributed by: Tobis Film
- Release date: 6 September 1937
- Running time: 90 minutes
- Country: Germany
- Language: German

The Citadel of Warsaw (German: Die Warschauer Zitadelle) is a 1937 German drama film directed by Fritz Peter Buch and starring Lucie Höflich, Werner Hinz and Viktoria von Ballasko. It was shot at the Johannistal Studios in Berlin. The film's sets were designed by the art directors Karl Haacker and Hermann Warm. It is based on the play Tamten by Gabriela Zapolska, previously made into the 1930 film The Citadel of Warsaw.

== Synopsis ==
In Warsaw, then part of the Russian Empire, Konrad a patriotic revolutionary, is targeted by the secret police official Colonel Korniloff.

== Cast ==
- Lucie Höflich as Frau Welgorska
- Werner Hinz as Konrad - ihr Sohn
- Claire Winter as Martha - ihre Tochter
- Viktoria von Ballasko as Anna Lasotzka
- Paul Hartmann as Oberst Korniloff
- Peter Elsholtz as Botkin - sein Adjutant
- Hans Leibelt as General Horn
- Walter Richter as Oberleutnant Strelkoff
- Eduard Wesener as Leutnant Nikoforoff
- Agnes Straub as Matalkowska
- Maria Sazarina as Józia
- Erich Ziegel as Dr. Bogdanski
- Otto Collin as Marjan - Student

== Bibliography ==
- Goble, Alan. The Complete Index to Literary Sources in Film. Walter de Gruyter, 1999.
- Klaus, Ulrich J. Deutsche Tonfilme: Jahrgang 1947. Klaus-Archiv, 1988.
- Moeller, Felix. The Film Minister: Goebbels and the Cinema in the Third Reich. Edition Axel Menges, 2000.
- Waldman, Harry. Nazi Films in America, 1933-1942. McFarland, 2008.
