= I'm Waiting for You =

1952 film

- Directed by: Volker von Collande
- Written by: Rudolf Beck; Volker von Collande
- Starring: Hanna Rucker; Joachim Brennecke; Anne-Marie Blanc
- Cinematography: Kurt Hasse
- Music by: Gustav Kneip
- Production company: Deutsche Spielfilm Gesellschaft
- Distributed by: Europa-Filmverleih
- Release date: 16 December 1952
- Running time: 94 minutes
- Country: West Germany
- Language: German

I'm Waiting for You (German: Ich warte auf dich) is a 1952 West German drama film directed by Volker von Collande and starring Hanna Rucker, Joachim Brennecke and Anne-Marie Blanc. It was shot at Göttingen Studios and on location around Sylt in Schleswig-Holstein.

== Cast ==
- Hanna Rucker as Barbara
- Joachim Brennecke as Peter Anweiler
- Anne-Marie Blanc as Frau Dr. Helm
- Volker von Collande as Kinderarzt Dr. Born
- Käthe Haack as Direktorin
- Ida Wüst as Tante Olga
- Petra Unkel as Ursel Born
- Annelies Schmiedel as Fräulein Schuster
- Hubert von Meyerinck as Studienrat Schwarze
- Willy Maertens as Hausmeister Wagner
- Irene Nathusius as Äpfelchen
- Xenia Pörtner as Gabriele
- Liliane Yvernault as Arlette
- Gudrun Thielemann as Garbo
- Gabriele Mascher as Holzwurm
- Maya Levare as Maya

== Bibliography ==
- Parish, Robert. Film Actors Guide. Scarecrow Press, 1977.
