= Man for Man =

1939 film directed by Robert A. Stemmle

- Directed by: Robert A. Stemmle
- Written by: Hans Schmodde; Robert A. Stemmle; Otto Bernhard Wendler
- Produced by: Eberhard Schmidt
- Starring: Gisela Uhlen; Viktoria von Ballasko; Gustav Knuth
- Cinematography: Robert Baberske
- Edited by: Milo Harbich
- Music by: Friedrich Schröder
- Production company: UFA
- Distributed by: UFA
- Release date: 4 August 1939
- Running time: 89 minutes
- Country: Germany
- Language: German

Man for Man (German: Mann für Mann) is a 1939 German drama film directed by Robert A. Stemmle and starring Gisela Uhlen, Viktoria von Ballasko and Gustav Knuth. Produced and distributed by UFA, it was shot at the company's Babelsberg Studios in Potsdam. The film's sets were designed by the art directors Otto Hunte and Karl Vollbrecht.

== Cast ==
- Gisela Uhlen as Erika Barrels
- Viktoria von Ballasko as Else Zügel
- Gustav Knuth as Walter Zügel
- Carl Kuhlmann as Hans Riemann
- Hermann Speelmans as Peter Klune
- Josef Sieber as Richard Gauter
- Heinz Welzel as Werner Handrup
- Ellen Bang as Anna Jasgulka, Büffetfräulein
- Toni Stohr as Alois Wille
- Walter Lieck as Karl Biermann
- Peter Elsholtz as Otto Sens
- Erich Peters as Haeckelt, Willi
- Eduard Wenck as Vater Bartels
- Annemarie Holtz as Mutter Bartels
- Lina Carstens as Mutter Handrup
- Paul Schwed as Lagerführer
- Oskar Höcker as Polier
- Johannes Barthel as Senkkastenmeister
- Fritz Hube as Schleusenmeister
- Gerhard Jeschke as Ingenieur
- Fritz Klaudius as Koch
- Armin Schweizer as Sanitäter
- Kurt Waitzmann as Arzt
- Marianne Simson as Tänzerin
- Hansi Wendler as Mädchen beim Lagerfest
- Jeanette Bethge as Elses Nachbarin
- Rolf Wernicke as Ansager

== Bibliography ==
- Klaus, Ulrich J. Deutsche Tonfilme: Jahrgang 1939. Klaus-Archiv, 1988.
- Moeller, Felix. The Film Minister: Goebbels and the Cinema in the Third Reich. Axel Menges, 2000.
- Waldman, Harry. Nazi Films in America, 1933-1942. McFarland, 2008.
