= Hadrian Maria Netto =

German actor (1885–1947)

- Born: 6 June 1885; Leipzig, Kingdom of Saxony, German Empire
- Died: 27 November 1947 (aged 62); Dresden, Saxony, Soviet occupation zone in Germany
- Occupation: Actor
- Years active: 1919-1945 (film)

Hadrian Maria Netto (1885–1947) was a German stage and film actor. He was also a playwright.

== Selected filmography ==
- A Woman for 24 Hours (1925)
- Destiny (1925)
- The Armoured Vault (1926)
- Love in the Cowshed (1928)
- There Is a Woman Who Never Forgets You (1930)
- Fire in the Opera House (1930)
- The Trunks of Mr. O.F. (1931)
- 24 Hours in the Life of a Woman (1931)
- Under False Flag (1932)
- The Testament of Dr. Mabuse (1933)
- Young Dessau's Great Love (1933)
- Just Once a Great Lady (1934)
- The Two Seals (1934)
- Love Conquers All (1934)
- Gypsy Blood (1934)
- Lessons in Love (1935)
- Land of Love (1937)
- My Son the Minister (1937)
- The Secret Lie (1938)
- Dance on the Volcano (1938)
- Target in the Clouds (1939)
- Bel Ami (1939)
- Trenck the Pandur (1940)
- Small Town Poet (1940)
- Woman Made to Measure (1940)
- Two Worlds (1940)
- Diesel (1942)
- The Eternal Tone (1943)
- The Court Concert (1948)

== Bibliography ==
- Giesen, Rolf. Nazi Propaganda Films: A History and Filmography. McFarland, 2003.
