= Under the Stars of Capri =

1953 film

- Directed by: Otto Linnekogel
- Written by: Gregor von Rezzori
- Starring: Hanna Rucker; Helmuth Schneider; Hans Leibelt
- Cinematography: Klaus Schumann
- Music by: Lothar Brühne
- Production company: Etsi-Film
- Distributed by: Europa-Filmverleih
- Release date: 26 November 1953
- Running time: 95 minutes
- Country: West Germany
- Language: German

Under the Stars of Capri (German: Unter den Sternen von Capri) is a 1953 West German romantic comedy film directed by Otto Linnekogel and starring Hanna Rucker, Helmuth Schneider and Hans Leibelt. It was shot at the Göttingen Studios and on location at a variety of places including Capri, Ischia, Corsica and Hamburg. The film's sets were designed by the art directors Walter Haag and Hans Kutzner.

== Cast ==
- Hanna Rucker as Christa
- Helmuth Schneider as Vincenz Rainalter
- Hans Leibelt as Kapitän Hagedorn
- Wera Frydtberg as Nina
- Karin Andersen as Uschi
- Eva Pflug as Waltraut
- Margarete Slezak as Singer
- Charlotte Agotz as Henriette
- Gerd Andree
- Siegfried Breuer as Reeder Bramfeld
- Hans Friedrich as Hans Holthusen
- Karl Hackenberg as Peter Bolz
- Trude Hesterberg
- Thessy Kuhls as Erste Bewerberin
- Anni Marle as Lotti Bolz
- Dr. Prasch as Erster Vorsitzender
- Lotte Rausch as Frau Erkens
- Rudi Schuricke as Singer
- Max Walter Sieg as Redakteur
- Werner Stock as Czerny
- Michel ter Wee as Francisco fabri
- Tilo von Berlepsch as Claus
- Carl Voscherau as Knorr
- Sonja Wilken as Lisa
- Herta Worell as Bell

== Bibliography ==
- Gerald Grote. Der Kommissar: eine Serie und ihre Folgen. Schwarzkopf und Schwarzkopf, 2003.
