= The Master Detective =

1944 film

- German DVD cover
- German: Der Meisterdetektiv
- Directed by: Hubert Marischka
- Written by: Kurt E. Walter; Felix von Eckardt
- Produced by: Friedrich Wilhelm Gaik
- Starring: Rudolf Platte
- Cinematography: Otto Baecker; Walter Pindter
- Edited by: Margarete Steinborn
- Music by: Frank Fox
- Production company: Berlin-Film
- Distributed by: Deutsche Filmvertriebs
- Release date: 10 July 1944
- Running time: 74 minutes
- Country: Germany
- Language: German

The Master Detective (German: Der Meisterdetektiv) is a 1944 German comedy film directed by Hubert Marischka and starring Rudolf Platte who plays a private detective. The film's sets were designed by the art directors Gustav A. Knauer and Arthur Schwarz.

== Cast ==
In alphabetical order

- Georg Alexander as Rittmeister a. D. Hans-Heinz Langendorff
- Hermann Brix as Neffe Helmut Langendorff
- Will Dohm as Diener Balduin
- Fritz Kampers as Nachbar Eberhard Matthesius
- Dorit Kreysler as Ballett-Tänzerin Ilse Braun
- Rudolf Platte as Privatdetektiv Bruch
- Erich Ponto as Gutsbesitzer Theobald Langendorff
- Charlotte Schultz as Gesellschafterin Agathe
- Grethe Weiser as Julia Langendorff
