= The Bath in the Barn (1943 film) =

1943 film

- Directed by: Volker von Collande
- Written by: Rolf Meyer; Herbert Tjadens; Volker von Collande
- Starring: Will Dohm; Heli Finkenzeller; Richard Häussler
- Cinematography: Andor von Barsy; Hermann Wallbrück
- Edited by: Walter von Bonhorst
- Music by: Theo Mackeben
- Production company: Tobis Film
- Distributed by: Deutsche Filmvertriebs
- Release date: 30 July 1943
- Running time: 88 minutes
- Country: Nazi Germany
- Language: German

The Bath in the Barn (German: Das Bad auf der Tenne) is a 1943 German comedy film directed by Volker von Collande and starring Will Dohm, Heli Finkenzeller and Richard Häussler.

The film is shot in Agfacolor, one of only a few German films made in colour during the war years. The film's sets were designed by the art directors Gabriel Pellon and Franz F. Fürst.

It was remade in 1956 under the same title.

== Cast ==
- Will Dohm as Hendrick, Bürgermeister
- Heli Finkenzeller as Antje, seine Frau
- Richard Häussler as Sartorius, Kaufherr aus Wien
- Gisela von Collande as Stin, Großmagd
- Marianne Simson as Nina, junge Magd
- Wilfried Seyferth as Jan, Amtsgehilfe
- Paul Henckels as Ule Sleeks, Handelsmann
- Walter Lieck as Severin, Kantor
- Gerta Böttcher as Nele, Wirtschafterin
- Hans Stiebner as Klas, Böttcher
- Erna Sellmer as Frau Klas, Böttcherin
- Franz Weber as Der alte Müller
- Claus Holm as Pieter, Müllersohn
- Friedrich Wilhelm Dann as Jeff, Bauer
- Cordula Grun as Jeffs Frau
- James Bachert as Bombolo, Leibmohr
- Hugo Flink as Franzl, Kutscher
- Paul Rehkopf as Haske, Bauer
- Anneliese Otten as Magd
- Margot Driesen as Magd
- Sigrid Kyra as Magd
- Rudolf Vones as Bauer
- Richard Eivenack as Bauer
- Albert Probeck as Bauer

== Bibliography ==
- Williams, Alan (2002). Film and Nationalism. New Brunswick, NJ: Rutgers University Press. ISBN 978-0-8135-3040-6.
