= Hanna Rucker =

German actress (1923–1982)

- Born: 14 December 1923; Munich, Germany
- Died: 1982 (aged 58–59); London, United Kingdom
- Other name: Johanna Rucker
- Occupation: Actress
- Years active: 1950-1957 (film)

Hanna Rucker (14 December 1923–1982) was a German stage and film actress.

== Selected filmography ==
- Heart of Stone (1950)
- Under the Thousand Lanterns (1952)
- I'm Waiting for You (1952)
- Under the Stars of Capri (1953)
- The Confession of Ina Kahr (1954)
- The First Kiss (1954)
- San Salvatore (1956)

== Bibliography ==
- Goble, Alan. The Complete Index to Literary Sources in Film. Walter de Gruyter, 1999.
