= Franz Doelle =

German composer

- Born: 9 November 1883; Mönchengladbach, Rhine Province, Kingdom of Prussia, German Empire
- Died: 15 March 1965 (aged 81); Leverkusen, North Rhine-Westphalia, West Germany
- Occupation: Composer
- Years active: 1932-1953 (film)

Franz Doelle (9 November 1883 – 15 March 1965) was a German composer. He worked on around fifty film scores during his career many of them operetta films.

== Selected filmography ==
- When the White Lilacs Bloom Again (1929)
- Mrs. Lehmann's Daughters (1932)
- The Escape to Nice (1932)
- The Little Crook (1933)
- Victor and Victoria (1933)
- A Day Will Come (1934)
- George and Georgette (1934)
- Miss Liselott (1934)
- Just Once a Great Lady (1934)
- Amphitryon (1935)
- The Royal Waltz (1935)
- Donogoo Tonka (1936)
- Donogoo (1936)
- The Irresistible Man (1937)
- A Man Astray (1940)
- Trenck the Pandur (1940)
- Carl Peters (1941)
- Secret File W.B.1 (1942)
- The Night in Venice (1942)
- A Beautiful Day (1944)
- The Impostor (1944)
- When the White Lilacs Bloom Again (1953)

== Bibliography ==
- Hull, David Stewart. Film in the Third Reich: a study of the German cinema, 1933-1945. University of California Press, 1969.
