= Trenck the Pandur =

1940 film

- Directed by: Herbert Selpin
- Written by: Walter Zerlett-Olfenius
- Based on: Trenck the Pandur by Emmerich Groh
- Produced by: Heinrich Jonen; Wilhelm Sperber
- Starring: Hans Albers; Käthe Dorsch; Sybille Schmitz
- Cinematography: Franz Koch
- Edited by: Friedel Buckow
- Music by: Franz Doelle
- Production company: Tobis Film
- Distributed by: Tobis Film
- Release date: 23 August 1940
- Running time: 80 minutes
- Country: Germany
- Language: German

Trenck the Pandur (German: Trenck, der Pandur) is a 1940 German historical adventure film directed by Herbert Selpin and starring Hans Albers, Käthe Dorsch and Sybille Schmitz. It was shot at the Babelsberg Studios and Johannisthal Studios in Berlin. The film's sets were designed by the art director Fritz Maurischat and Fritz Lück. It is loosely based on the life of Baron Franz von der Trenck, the commander of Trenck's Pandurs raised during the reign of Maria Theresa of Austria. The film was laced with anti-French attitudes, as when it was went into production Nazi Germany and France were enemies in the Second World War. By the time the film was released France had been forced into an armistice after the German invasion.

== Synopsis ==
The nobleman Trenck returns to Vienna after many years away and raises a unit of Pandurs to serve in the War of the Austrian Succession. He has recently escaped from Russia after facing a court martial and execution, and his romantic entanglements have threatened Austria's important alliance with Russia. He leads his Pandurs against the French to redeem himself, but proves himself most useful in foiling a scheme by the French spies Countess St. Croix and Prince Solojew. The latter is betrothed to Prinzessin Deinhardstein who Trenck has rescued from her unwanted engagement.

== Cast ==
- Hans Albers as Freiherr von der Trenck
- Käthe Dorsch as Kaiserin Maria Theresia
- Sybille Schmitz as Prinzessin Deinhardstein
- Hilde Weissner as Gräfin St. Croix
- Elisabeth Flickenschildt as Natalie Alexandrowa Fürstin Solojew
- Hans Nielsen as Laudon
- Oskar Sima as Harun Bashi
- Jaspar von Oertzen as Todt
- Peter Voß as Fürst Khevenhüller
- Herbert Hübner as Fürst Solojew
- Karl Fochler as Prokop, Oberstleutnant
- Hubert von Meyerinck as Herr von Sazenthal
- Harry Hardt as Major Löwenwalde
- Hadrian Maria Netto as Zeremonienmeister b. K.
- Theodor Thony as Marschall Coigny
- Josef Peterhans as Zeremonienmeister Deinartstein
- Fritz Hinz-Fabricius as Herr von Sommerfeld
- Boris Alekin as Russischer Leutnant

== Bibliography ==
- Goble, Alan. The Complete Index to Literary Sources in Film. Walter de Gruyter, 1999.
- Klaus, Ulrich J. Deutsche Tonfilme: Jahrgang 1940. Klaus-Archiv, 1988.
- Moeller, Felix. The Film Minister: Goebbels and the Cinema in the Third Reich. Axel Menges, 2000.
