= Werner Eisbrenner =

German composer and conductor

Werner Friedrich Emil Eisbrenner (2 December 1908, Berlin – 7 November 1981, West Berlin) was a German composer and conductor, best known for his film music.

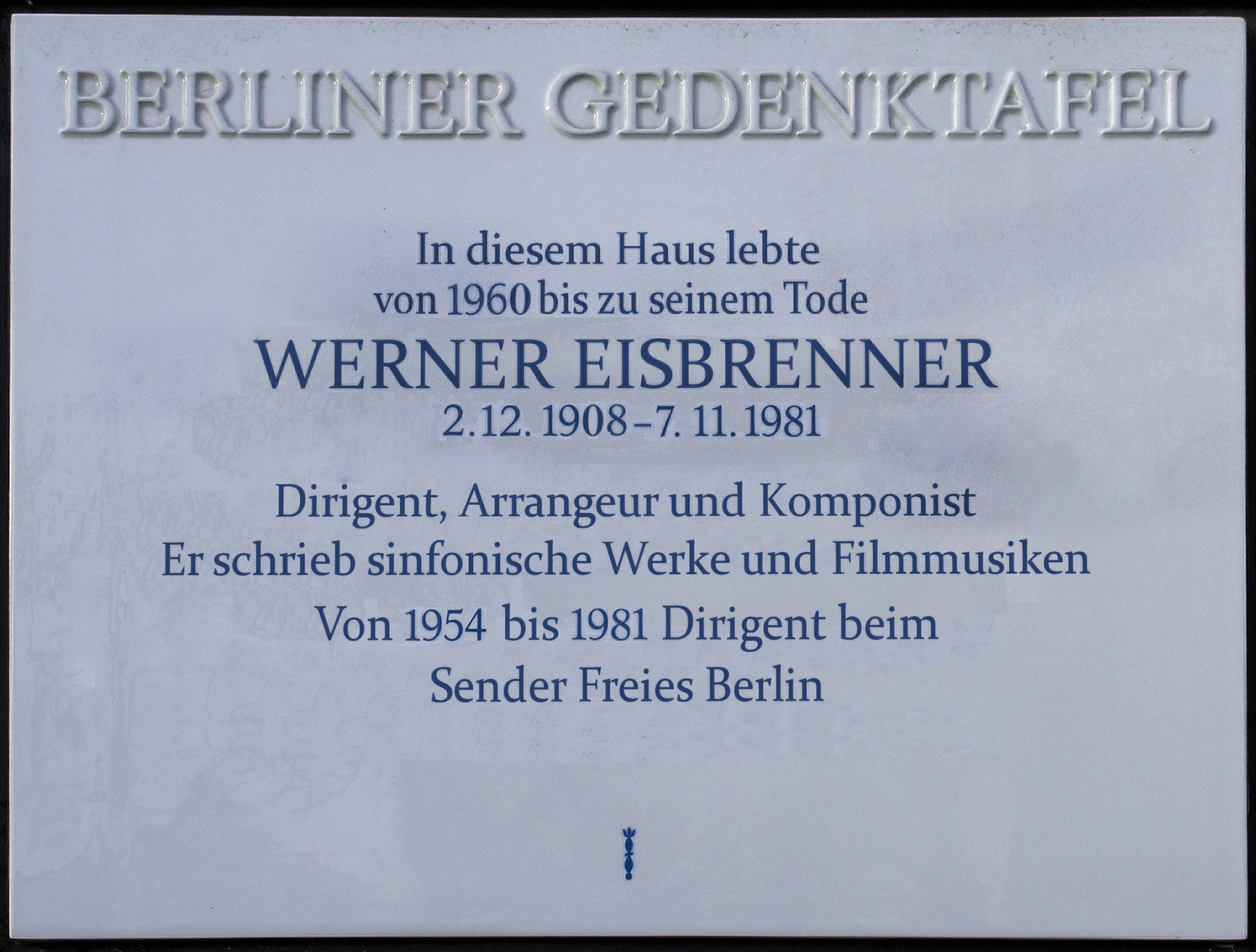

Eisbrenner studied church music and musical education from 1927 to 1929 at the Berlin Staatlichen Musikademie. He then worked as a pianist, arranger, Kapellmeister and conductor, as well as composing violin concertos, orchestral music, the musical comedy Von Hand zu Hand and the music for film, radio and television for which he is best known. This includes the theme for Hans Albers's film Große Freiheit Nr. 7.

Eisbrenner was a member of the jury at the 1st Berlin International Film Festival.

Eisbrenner also headed a private "Lehrinstitut für Kirchen- und Schulmusik". In 1974, he received the Filmband in Gold for his long and outstanding contributions to German film. On 23 April 1998 a plaque was unveiled at his former home at Wohnung Bismarckallee 32a in Berlin. He was married to Kathe (née Jacobi) Eisbrenner (b. ?? – d. 11 March 1974). He is buried in the Waldfriedhof Dahlem.

== Selected filmography ==
- The Higher Command (1935)
- Donogoo (1936)
- The Blue Mouse (1936)
- Donogoo Tonka (1936)
- Anna Favetti (1938)
- Women for Golden Hill (1938)
- Central Rio (1939)
- Between Hamburg and Haiti (1940)
- Commissioner Eyck (1940)
- Between Heaven and Earth (1942)
- The Golden Spider (1943)
- Titanic (1943)
- Romance in a Minor Key (1943)
- Free Land (1946)
- Between Yesterday and Tomorrow (1947)
- Raid (1947)
- Paths in Twilight (1948)
- Thank You, I'm Fine (1948)
- Gaspary's Sons (1948)
- Martina (1949)
- The Prisoner (1949)
- I'll Never Forget That Night (1949)
- This Man Belongs to Me (1950)
- Melody of Fate (1950)
- Bluebeard (1951)
- Nights on the Road (1952)
- The White Horse Inn (1952)
- Jonny Saves Nebrador (1953)
- Confession Under Four Eyes (1954)
- A Love Story (1954)
- The Ambassador's Wife (1955)
- The Last Man (1955)
- The Cornet (1955)
- Reaching for the Stars (1955)
- Children, Mother, and the General (1955)
- My Father, the Actor (1956)
- The Glass Tower (1957)
- King in Shadow (1957)
- The Buddenbrooks (1959)
- Storm in a Water Glass (1960)
- Barbara (1961)
