= Walter Pindter =

German cinematographer

- Born: 17 June 1911; Berlin, German Empire
- Died: 23 December 1989 (aged 78); Cologne, North Rhine-Westphalia, West Germany
- Occupation: Cinematographer
- Years active: 1933-1952 (film)

Walter Pindter (1911–1989) was a German cinematographer.

== Selected filmography ==
- Little Girl, Great Fortune (1933)
- Cocoanut (1939)
- Central Rio (1939)
- Woman Made to Measure (1940)
- Counterfeiters (1940)
- Two Worlds (1940)
- Friedemann Bach (1941)
- 5 June (1942)
- Melody of a Great City (1943)
- The Master Detective (1944)
- The Roedern Affair (1944)
- Tell the Truth (1946)
- Twelve Hearts for Charly (1949)
- Sensation in Savoy (1950)
- Desire (1951)

== Bibliography ==
- Giesen, Rolf. Nazi Propaganda Films: A History and Filmography. McFarland, 2003.
