= Friedel Buckow =

German film editor

- Born: 9 July 1897; Berlin, German Empire
- Died: 13 September 1979 (aged 82); Munich, Bavaria, West Germany
- Occupation: Film editor
- Years active: 1929-1963 (film & TV)

Friedel Buckow (1897–1979) was a German film editor. She began her career in the Weimar Republic, and was assistant director on several films such as I Kiss Your Hand, Madame. From 1931 she focused on editing films and remained active in German cinema through the Nazi era and into post-war West Germany. She is particularly noted for her editing of the 1943 film Titanic.

== Selected filmography ==
- Gloria (1931)
- Countess Mariza (1932)
- Impossible Love (1932)
- Unheimliche Geschichten (1932)
- The Magic Top Hat (1932)
- Spies at the Savoy Hotel (1932)
- The Judas of Tyrol (1933)
- A City Upside Down (1933)
- Liebelei (1933)
- The Flower of Hawaii (1933)
- A Song Goes Round the World (1933)
- Adventure on the Southern Express (1934)
- Pillars of Society (1935)
- The Haunted Castle (1936)
- A Man Astray (1940)
- Her Private Secretary (1940)
- Trenck the Pandur (1940)
- Carl Peters (1941)
- Secret File W.B.1 (1942)
- Titanic (1943)
- Twelve Hearts for Charly (1949)
- Who Is This That I Love? (1950)
- Once on the Rhine (1952)
- The Bachelor Trap (1953)
- Jonny Saves Nebrador (1953)
- The Bird Seller (1953)
- Don't Worry About Your Mother-in-Law (1954)
- Victoria and Her Hussar (1954)
- Sand, Love and Salt (1957)
- All the Sins of the Earth (1958)
- Sin Began with Eve (1958)
- The Head (1959)

== Bibliography ==
- Bergfelder, Tim & Street, Sarah. The Titanic in Myth and Memory: Representations in Visual and Literary Culture. Bloomsbury Publishing, 2004.
- Giesen, Rolf. Nazi Propaganda Films: A History and Filmography. McFarland & Company, 2003.
