= Under the Thousand Lanterns =

1952 film directed by Erich Engel

- Film poster
- Directed by: Erich Engel
- Written by: Erich Engel; Robert Gilbert (novel); Robert A. Stemmle
- Produced by: Walter Koppel; Gyula Trebitsch
- Starring: Michel Auclair; Gisela Trowe; Hanna Rucker
- Cinematography: Ekkehard Kyrath
- Edited by: Klaus Dudenhöfer
- Music by: Michael Jary
- Production company: Real Film
- Distributed by: Allianz Filmverleih
- Release date: 10 April 1952
- Running time: 94 minutes
- Countries: France; West Germany
- Language: German

Under the Thousand Lanterns (German: Unter den tausend Laternen) is a 1952 French–West German crime film directed by Erich Engel and starring Michel Auclair, Gisela Trowe, and Hanna Rucker. It was entered into the 1952 Cannes Film Festival. It was made by Real Film at the Wandsbek Studios in Hamburg and on location in the city. The film's sets were designed by Albrecht Becker and Herbert Kirchhoff.

== Synopsis ==
Singer Elisa visits the house of the composer of the new revue she is to star in, only to find his dead body. Suspicions fall on several of the murdered man's colleagues including French musician Michel Dumas, whose compositions the deceased had been passing off as his own, as well as on Elisa herself.

== Cast ==
- Michel Auclair as Michel Dumas
- Gisela Trowe as Betty
- Hanna Rucker as Elisa
- Inge Meysel as Auguste
- René Deltgen as Kommissar Dr. Hennings
- Willy Maertens as Mahnke, Gerichtsvollzieher
- Ernst Schröder as Braun
- Carl-Heinz Schroth as Lüders, Theaterdirektor
- Joseph Offenbach as Taxichauffeur
- Carl Voscherau as Protokollführer
- Katharina Brauren as Lissy, Garderobiere

== Bibliography ==
- Parish, James Robert; Canham, Kingsley (1976). Film Directors Guide: Western Europe. Metuchen, NJ: Scarecrow Press. ISBN 978-0-8108-0908-6.
