= Immortal Light =

1951 film directed by Arthur Maria Rabenalt

- Directed by: Arthur Maria Rabenalt
- Written by: Alexander Lix; Vahagen Vartany
- Produced by: Vahagen Vartany
- Starring: Rudolf Forster; Cornell Borchers; Volker von Collande
- Cinematography: Konstantin Irmen-Tschet
- Edited by: Heinz Haber
- Music by: Ralph Benatzky; Bert Grund
- Production company: Badal-Film
- Distributed by: Union-Film
- Release date: 22 March 1951
- Running time: 93 minutes
- Country: West Germany
- Language: German

Immortal Light (German: Unvergängliches Licht) is a 1951 West German drama film directed by Arthur Maria Rabenalt and starring Rudolf Forster, Cornell Borchers and Volker von Collande. It was shot at the Bavaria Studios in Munich and on location in Paris. The film's sets were designed by the art directors Willi A. Herrmann and Heinrich Weidemann.

== Synopsis ==
After a happy upbringing the death of Michèle Printemps's father leaves her in the hands of her cruel mother who tries to sell her into a life of prostitution in Paris. She escapes this life when she meets the young engineer and aspiring racing driver René Garnier. However, after discovering that she has a serious illness, she pushes him away, selflessly wanting him to concentrate on his own career.

== Cast ==
- Rudolf Forster as Graf Kalinsky
- Cornell Borchers as Michèle Printemps
- Volker von Collande as René Garnier
- Hilde Hildebrand as Madame de Latour
- Hans Reiser as Marcel
- Nicolaus Ellin as Kammerdiener Sascha
- Gustav Waldau as Dr. Duval
- Fritz Reiff as Engländer
- Loni Heuser as Diseuse
- Rudolf Reiff as Perrin
- Katharina Mayberg as Perrins Tochter
- Wolfgang Keppler as Cherrier
- Harald Mannl as Bezirksarzt
- Arnulf Schröder as Portier

== Bibliography ==
- Bock, Hans-Michael; Bergfelder, Tim, eds. (2009). The Concise Cinegraph: Encyclopaedia of German Cinema. New York: Berghahn Books. ISBN 978-1-57181-655-9.
