= Dorit Kreysler =

Austrian actress (1909–1999)

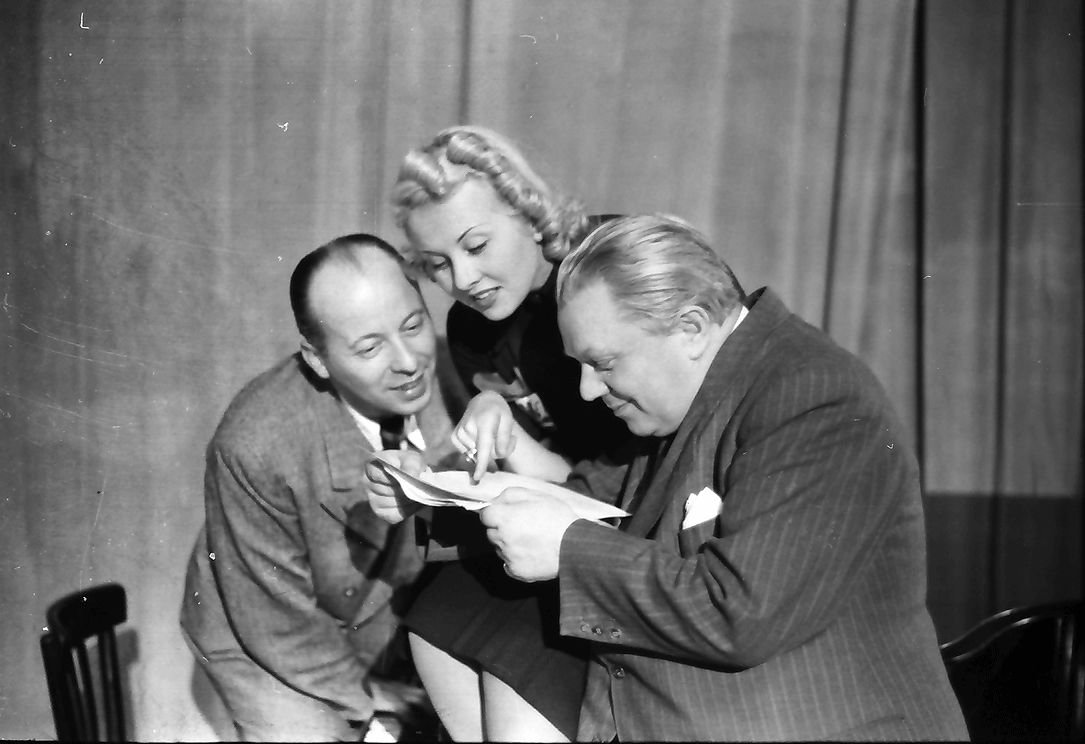
- With Peter Igelhoff (left) and Willi Schaeffers (right) in 1938
- Born: 5 December 1909; Mödling, Lower Austria, Austro-Hungarian Empire
- Died: 16 December 1999 (aged 90); Vienna, Austria
- Other name: Dorothea Josephina Friederike Nicoletta Kreisler
- Occupation: Actress
- Years active: 1934–1972 (film)

Dorit Kreysler (1909–1999) was an Austrian film actress. She spent much of her career in the German film industry.

== Filmography ==
Year	Title	Role	Notes
1934	Enjoy Yourselves	Gusti Melzer, Kellnerin im "Bratwurstglöckl"	
1934	Mr. Kobin Seeks Adventure	Monika, seine Frau	
1934	Jungfrau gegen Mönch	Mutz Hagedorn	
1935	Fresh Wind from Canada	Karin, seine Tochter	
1935	A Night on the Danube	Steffi Eidinger, Primgeigerin der Kapelle 'Donauschwalben'	
1938	Peter spielt mit dem Feuer	Steffie von Egge	
1939	Die kluge Schwiegermutter	Liselott	
1939	Woman Without a Past	Ellen, Ruths Freundin	
1940	Commissioner Eyck	Mrs. Gustafson	
1940	Woman Made to Measure	Fräulein Zettlund	
1940	Liebesschule	Lili, Zigarettenmädchen	
1940	My Daughter Lives in Vienna	Marga Fritsch	
1940	Herz ohne Heimat	Lizzie	
1940	Roses in Tyrol	Lisa	
1940	Vienna Blood	Liesl Stadler (dancer)	
1943	Carnival of Love	Kitty, Tänzerin	
1943	Die Wirtin zum Weißen Röß'l	Reserl	
1943	Beloved Darling	Eva	
1944	The Master Detective	Ballett-Tänzerin Ilse Braun	
1946	Die Fledermaus	Adele	
1949	Twelve Hearts for Charly	Frau Eichhorn	
1949	Nothing But Coincidence	Frau Osterloh	
1949	Artists' Blood	Lissy Schilling - Dolmetscherin	
1949	The Appeal to Conscience	Blumenverkäuferin	
1949	I'll Make You Happy	Vera	
1950	Wedding with Erika	Irene	
1951	Czardas of Hearts	Lilly	
1951	Sensation in San Remo	Lydia Leer	
1952	The Chaste Libertine	Rita Reiner	
1952	I Lost My Heart in Heidelberg	Pia Biberger	
1953	The Postponed Wedding Night	Mady	
1953	Aunt Jutta from Calcutta	Baby	
1954	Cabaret	Franzi Holm	
1955	The Inn on the Lahn		
1955	Mensch ärger' dich nicht!		
1956	In Hamburg When the Nights Are Long		
1956	Opera Ball	Hanni, Dienstmädchen bei Dannhauser	
1956	Love, Summer and Music	Resi Rinnertaler, Tonis Schwester	
1957	Zwei Herzen voller Seligkeit	Frau Nina Krause - Patientin	
1957	The Simple Girl	Mrs. Seidel	

== Bibliography ==
- Goble, Alan. The Complete Index to Literary Sources in Film. Walter de Gruyter, 1999.
