= Light of Heart =

1943 film directed by Carl Boese

- Directed by: Carl Boese
- Written by: Felix von Eckardt
- Produced by: Herbert Engelsing
- Starring: Hans Nielsen; Carola Höhn; Werner Fuetterer; Hansi Wendler
- Cinematography: Walter Roßkopf
- Edited by: Johanna Rosinski
- Music by: Ernst Erich Buder
- Production company: Tobis Film
- Distributed by: Deutsche Filmvertriebs
- Release date: 7 December 1943
- Running time: 74 minutes
- Country: Germany
- Language: German

Light of Heart (German: Leichtes Blut) is a 1943 German comedy film directed by Carl Boese and starring Hans Nielsen, Carola Höhn, Werner Fuetterer and Hansi Wendler. It was shot at the Johannisthal Studios in Berlin. The film's sets were designed by the art directors Franz Koehn and Hans Kuhnert.

== Synopsis ==
Professor Faber, an entomologist, is in love with Herta but is alarmed by the time she spends with the sculptor Karl. He is filled with jealousy when he mistakenly believes that a nude statuette produced by Karl is based on Herta as the model. Encouraged in his jealousy by his housekeeper Christine, he decides to take out his secretary Doris who is in fact in a relationship with Karl. Ultimately, the confusions are cleared up and Faber and Herta become engaged.

== Cast ==
- Hans Nielsen as Professor Faber
- Carola Höhn as Herta Wilhelmi
- Werner Fuetterer as Karl Schwertfeger
- Hansi Wendler as Doris Glaser, Sekretärin bei Faber
- Roma Bahn as Christine
- Günther Lüders as Philipp
- Karl Heinz Reichel as Hans Grund, Student
- Erich Fiedler as Professor Brettschneider
- Waltraut Hahne as Trudchen
- Walter Lieck as Fritze
- Hubert von Meyerinck as Möllendorf
- Alexa von Porembsky as Frl. Assmann
- Ruth Lommel as Frl. Dorothee
- Erwin Biegel as Taxi-Chauffeur
- Heinrich Troxbömker as Autokäufer
- Käte Kühl as Autokäuferin
- Ewald Wenck as Zeitungsfahrer
- Joachim Cadenbach as Student
- Josef Gindorf as Student
- Karl Jüstel as Autoverkäufer
- Alfred Karen as Ein Gast im Restaurant am Tisch Möllendorfs
- Leo Peukert as Älterer Kellner
- Herbert Weissbach as Fotograf

== Bibliography ==
- Bock, Hans-Michael . Die Tobis 1928-1945: eine kommentierte Filmografie. Edition Text + Kritik, 2003.
- Klaus, Ulrich J. Deutsche Tonfilme: Jahrgang 1943. Klaus-Archiv, 1988.
