= Marianne Simson =

- Born: 29 July 1920; Berlin, Germany
- Died: 15 July 1992 (aged 71); Füssen, Bavaria, Germany
- Other name: Marianne Lena Elisabeth Clara Simson
- Occupations: Actress, Dancer
- Years active: 1935 - 1945 (film)

Marianne Simson (July 29, 1920 – July 15, 1992) was a German dancer and film actress.

She was born in Berlin as the daughter of an insurance clerk John Edward Simson. Her brother was Helmut Simson, who later served as mayor of Wolfsburg. Originally trained as a ballerina, she made her screen debut in Frisions in Distress (1935) and went on to appear in another seventeen films over the next decade, generally in supporting roles.

In 1944 she informed on a Germany army major to the Gestapo for allegedly making comments supportive of the 20 July plot to assassinate Adolf Hitler. Following the defeat of Germany, Simson was arrested by the Soviet NKVD and placed in a series of detention camps. In 1950 she was sentenced to eight years in prison at the Waldheim Trials, but was given an early release in 1952 and moved to West Germany. She worked as a choreographer in some stage productions, and married the theatre director Wilhelm List Diehl.

== Selected filmography ==
Year	Title	Role	Notes
1939	Schneewittchen und die Sieben Zwerge	Schneewittchen	
1939	Man for Man	Dancer	
1940	Two Worlds	Agnes Bremer-Bratt	
1941	The Swedish Nightingale	Karin Nielsson	
1942	Two in a Big City	Inge Torff	
1942	Andreas Schlüter	Leonore Schlüter	
1943	The Bath in the Barn	Nina, junge Magd	
1943	The Adventures of Baron Munchausen	Die Mondfrau	
1944	The Buchholz Family	Emmi, beider Tochter	
1944	Marriage of Affection	Emmi Wrenzchen	
1948	An Everyday Story	Anneliese Schwarz	

== Bibliography ==
- Barker, Peter. GDR and Its History. Rodopi, 2000.
