= The Years Pass =

1945 film

- Directed by: Günther Rittau
- Written by: Erich Ebermayer (novel); Richard Nicolas
- Produced by: Herbert Engelsing; Walter Zeiske
- Starring: Heidemarie Hatheyer; Carl Kuhlmann; Werner Fuetterer
- Cinematography: Friedl Behn-Grund
- Edited by: Ilse Voigt
- Music by: Wolfgang Zeller
- Production company: Tobis Film
- Distributed by: Tobis Film
- Release date: 6 February 1945
- Running time: 81 minutes
- Country: Germany
- Language: German

The Years Pass (German: Die Jahre vergehen) is a 1945 German drama film directed by Günther Rittau and starring Heidemarie Hatheyer, Carl Kuhlmann and Werner Fuetterer. It was shot at the Althoff Studios in Berlin and on location around Garmisch-Partenkirchen in Bavaria. The film's sets were designed by the art directors Willy Schiller and Karl Vollbrecht.

== Cast ==
- Heidemarie Hatheyer as Frau Irene Behrendsen
- Carl Kuhlmann as Senator Ferdinand Kersten
- Werner Fuetterer as Wilhelm Kersten, dessen Sohn
- Walter Franck as Georg Behrendsen
- Agnes Windeck as Fau Mathilde Kersten
- Käthe Dyckhoff as Viktoria Kersten, Tochter von Wilhelm Kersten
- Rolf Moebius as Peter Behrendsen, Sohn von Irene und Georg
- Erwin Biegel as Kasselmann, Prokurist
- Franz Schafheitlin as Justizrat Carlsen
- Walter Bechmann as Justizrat Petersdorf
- Walter Gross as Scholtes, Besitzer einer Instrumentenhandlung
- Maria Besendahl as Lisa, Hausmädchen
- Erich Fiedler as Eugen Karp, Kaufmann
- Manny Ziener as Frau Steinrode
- Gert Bornowsky
- Michael von Newlinsky
- Ilse Pellemaier
- Rudolf Reinhard
- Max Hiller

== Bibliography ==
- Bock, Hans-Michael & Bergfelder, Tim. The Concise CineGraph. Encyclopedia of German Cinema. Berghahn Books, 2009.
