= Robert Koch (film) =

1939 Nazi propaganda film

- German promotional image
- Directed by: Hans Steinhoff
- Written by: Lotte Neumann; Gerhard Menzel; Walter Wassermann; Paul Josef Cremers
- Based on: Robert Koch, Roman eines grosse Lebens by Hellmuth Unger
- Produced by: Gerhard Staab; Emil Jannings
- Starring: Emil Jannings; Werner Krauss; Viktoria von Ballasko; Raimund Schelcher
- Cinematography: Fritz Arno Wagner
- Edited by: Martha Dübber
- Music by: Wolfgang Zeller
- Production company: Tobis Film
- Distributed by: Tobis Film (Germany); UFA (US)
- Release date: 26 September 1939
- Running time: 113 minutes
- Country: Germany
- Language: German

Robert Koch (German title: Robert Koch, der Bekämpfer des Todes, English title: Robert Koch: The Battle Against Death) is a 1939 Nazi propaganda film directed by Hans Steinhoff and starring Emil Jannings, Werner Krauss and Viktoria von Ballasko. The film was a biopic of the German pioneering microbiologist Robert Koch (1843–1910). It was shot at the Johannisthal Studios in Berlin and premiered at the city's Ufa-Palast am Zoo. The film was made by the Tobis Film company, and was also distributed in the United States by UFA.

== Cast ==
- Emil Jannings as Dr. Robert Koch
- Werner Krauss as Geheimrat Rudolf Virchow
- Viktoria von Ballasko as Schwester Else
- Raimund Schelcher as Koch's Assistant Dr. Fritz von Hartwig
- Hilde Körber as Frau Göhrke
- Theodor Loos as Koch's Assistant Dr. Georg Gaffky
- Otto Graf as Koch's Assistant Dr. Friedrich Löffler
- Hildegard Grethe as Emmy Koch
- Josef Sieber as Waldhüter Göhrke
- Peter Elsholtz as Virchows Sekretär Dr. Karl Wetzel
- Elisabeth Flickenschildt as Baronin von Kossin
- Bernhard Minetti as Sprecher der Gesundbeter
- Paul Bildt as Reichstagsabgeordneter Baron von Kossin
- Paul Dahlke as Lehrer
- Rolf Prasch as Kaiser Wilhelm I.
- Paul Otto as Landrat von Hartwig
- Rudolf Klein-Rogge as Rechnungsrat
- Walter Werner as Amtsdiener Stübecke
- Jakob Tiedtke as Amtsdiener Michalke
- Friedrich Otto Fischer as Otto von Bismarck
- Walter Bechmann as Gesundbeter
- Charly Berger as Gast beim Hofball (guest at the court ball)
- Walter Bruckner
- Ernst Dernburg as Mitglied der Berliner Fakultät
- Fritz Draeger as Gast beim Hofball
- Erich Dunskus as Mitglied der Berliner Fakultät
- Wilhelm Egger-Sell as Wissenschaftler im Pathologischen Institu
- Max Harry Ernst as Gast beim Hofball
- Kurt Felden as Wissenschaftler im Pathologischen Institu
- Robert Forsch as Wissenschaftler im Pathologischen Institu
- Werner Funck as Wissenschaftler im Pathologischen Institu
- Georg Gartz as Wissenschaftler im Pathologischen Institu
- Herbert Gernot as Arzt
- Bernhard Goetzke as Kochs Patient Netschmann
- Karl Hannemann as Viehhändler
- Karl Haubenreißer as Direktor der Charité
- Karl Heidmann as Gesundbeter
- Kurt Herrmann as Wissenschaftler im Pathologischen Institu
- Alfred Heynisch as Wissenschaftler im Pathologischen Institu
- Paul Hildebrandt as 2. Assistenzarzt Virchows
- Maria Hofen as Gesundbeterin
- Lucie Höflich as Kochs Patientin Frau Paul
- Carl Jönsson as Mitglied der Berliner Fakultät
- Karl Kahlmann as Wissenschaftler im Pathologischen Institu
- Willy Kaiser-Heyl as Mitglied der Berliner Fakultät
- Alfred Karen as Uniformierter beim Empfang des Kaisers
- Fred Köster as Reichstagsdiener
- Paul Luka
- Philipp Manning as Mitglied der Berliner Fakultät
- Heinz Müller as Mann am Stammtisch
- Karl Platen as Herr Kruhlke
- Werner Pledath as Wissenschaftler im Pathologischen Institut
- Klaus Pohl as Wissenschaftler im Pathologischen Institu
- Paul Rehkopf as Wissenschaftler im Pathologischen Institu
- Josef Reithofer as 1. Assistenzarzt Virchows
- Ferdinand Robert as Gast beim Hofball
- Werner Schott as Arzt
- Walter Schramm-Duncker as Aktenabhefter
- Charlotte Schultz as Reinemachefrau
- Franz Stein as Wissenschaftler im Pathologischen Institu
- Max Vierlinger
- Egon Vogel as Mitglied der Berliner Fakultät
- Jens von Hagen as Gast beim Hofball
- Leopold von Ledebur as Reichstagsdiener
- Hubert von Meyerinck as Fähnrich Graf
- Elisabeth von Ruets as Gast beim Hofball
- Eduard von Winterstein as Prof. Ernst von Bergmann
- Karl Wagner as Menzel
- Auguste Wanner-Kirsch as Patientin
- Gertrud Wolle as Reinemachefrau

== Bibliography ==
- Reimer, Robert C. & Reimer, Carol J. The A to Z of German Cinema. Scarecrow Press, 2010.
