= 5 June (film) =

1942 film

- Directed by: Fritz Kirchhoff
- Written by: Walter Ulbrich
- Produced by: Walter Ulbrich
- Starring: Carl Raddatz; Joachim Brennecke; Karl Ludwig Diehl; Gisela Uhlen
- Cinematography: Walter Pindter
- Edited by: Walter Wischniewsky
- Music by: Georg Haentzschel
- Production company: UFA
- Distributed by: UFA
- Release date: 25 August 1942
- Running time: 99 minutes
- Country: Germany
- Language: German

5 June (German: Der 5. Juni) is a 1942 German war film directed by Fritz Kirchhoff and starring Carl Raddatz, Joachim Brennecke and Karl Ludwig Diehl. The film depicts the events of 1940 when German forces successfully invaded France. It was shot on location in France and Germany. The film was made at the Babelsberg Studio in Berlin, and around Brittany, Mulhouse and Brandenburg. The film's sets were designed by the art directors Erich Kettelhut, Herbert Nitzschke and Wilhelm Vorwerg.

Constant changes to the film, often at the request of the German military, led to large cost overruns. In November 1942, the film was banned by the Minister of Public Enlightenment and Propaganda Joseph Goebbels for unspecified reasons. It has been speculated that Goebbels thought the film was not entertaining enough or wished to avoid offending the Vichy government of France.

== Main cast ==
- Carl Raddatz as Feldwebel Richard Schulz
- Joachim Brennecke as Gefreiter Eickhoff
- Karl Ludwig Diehl as Generalmajor Lüchten
- Gisela Uhlen as Luise Reiniger
- Paul Günther as Hamann
- Ernst von Klipstein as Oberleutnant Lebsten
- Gerhard Geisler as Stabsfeldwebel Eickhoff
- Hans Richter as Norbert Nauke
- Josef Kamper as Klawitter
- Werner Völger as Retzlaff

== Bibliography ==
- Eltin, Richard A., ed. (2002). Art, Culture, and Media Under the Third Reich. University of Chicago Press. ISBN 978-0-226-22087-1.
- Kreimeier, Klaus (1999). The Ufa Story: A History of Germany's Greatest Film Company, 1918–1945. University of California Press. ISBN 978-0-520-22069-0.
- Hull, David Stewart (1969). Film in the Third Reich: A Study of the German Cinema, 1933–1945. University of California Press. ISBN 978-0-520-01489-3.
