= The Night in Venice =

1942 film directed by Paul Verhoeven

- Directed by: Paul Verhoeven
- Written by: Lotte Neumann; Walter Wassermann
- Produced by: Herbert Engelsing
- Starring: Heidemarie Hatheyer; Lizzi Waldmüller; Hans Nielsen
- Cinematography: Friedl Behn-Grund
- Edited by: Elisabeth Kleinert-Neumann
- Music by: Franz Doelle
- Production company: Tobis Film
- Distributed by: Tobis Film
- Release date: 2 April 1942
- Running time: 89 minutes
- Country: Germany
- Language: German

The Night in Venice (German: Die Nacht in Venedig) is a 1942 German romantic comedy film directed by Paul Verhoeven and starring Heidemarie Hatheyer, Lizzi Waldmüller and Hans Nielsen. It was shot at the Johannisthal Studios in Berlin and on location in Venice. The film's sets were designed by the art directors Franz Bi and Botho Hoefer.

== Cast ==
- Heidemarie Hatheyer as Annemarie Pleß, Stenotypistin
- Lizzi Waldmüller as Operettendiva Vilma Berner
- Hans Nielsen as Dr. Nikolaus Roll, genannt Niki, Kaufmann
- Harald Paulsen as Kammersänger Peter Laurenz
- Erich Ponto as Direktor Arnold Richard Schmitz, Parfümfabrikant
- Paul Henckels as Direktor Winand, Parfümfabrikant
- Erika von Thellmann as Olly Hagen
- Walter Steinbeck as Mertens, deutscher Theaterdirektor
- Kurt Vespermann as Nicolo, Italienischer Theaterdirektor
- Paul Verhoeven as Buchhalter Paul Schmitz
- Leo Peukert as Der Wirt der Osteria
- Walter Lieck as Der Hotelportier
- Ursula Herking as Frl. Köberle, Sekretärin bei Dr. Roll
- Edith Oß as Mizzi, Begleiterin Vilmas
- Hansi Wendler as Nina, Hausmädchen im Hotel
- Antonietta Forzutti as Giudetta, die italienische Braut
- Pietro Zennaro as Beppo, der engagierte Gondoliere
- Angelo Ferrari as Der Gitarrenspieler bei der Hochzeit
- Gerta Böttcher as Junge Frau bei Vilmas Gesang
- Harry Hardt as Der Hoteldirektor
- Melanie Horeschowsky as Ankommender Gast im Hotel in Venedig
- Wilhelm P. Krüger as Theaterinspizient

== Bibliography ==
- Bock, Hans-Michael. Die Tobis 1928-1945: eine kommentierte Filmografie. Edition Text + Kritik, 2003.
- Klaus, Ulrich J. Deutsche Tonfilme: Jahrgang 1942. Klaus-Archiv, 1988.
- Romani, Cinzia. Tainted Goddesses : Female Film Stars of the Third Reich. Da Capo Press, 1992.
