= The Curtain Falls =

1939 film

- German film poster
- German: Der Vorhang fällt
- Directed by: Georg Jacoby
- Written by: Paul van der Hurck (play); Georg Zoch
- Produced by: Ulrich Mohrbutter
- Starring: Anneliese Uhlig; Elfie Mayerhofer; Hilde Sessak
- Cinematography: Ekkehard Kyrath; Günther Rittau
- Edited by: Erich Kobler
- Music by: Franz Grothe
- Production company: UFA
- Distributed by: UFA
- Release date: 13 July 1939
- Running time: 91 minutes
- Country: Germany
- Language: German

The Curtain Falls (German: Der Vorhang fällt) is a 1939 German crime film directed by Georg Jacoby and starring Anneliese Uhlig, Elfie Mayerhofer and Hilde Sessak. It was based on a play by Paul van der Hurck and was made by UFA at the company's Babelsberg Studios in Berlin. The film's sets were designed by the art director Erich Kettelhut.

== Cast ==
- Anneliese Uhlig as Alice Souchy
- Elfie Mayerhofer as Inge Blohm
- Hilde Sessak as Vera Findtejs
- Gustav Knuth as Doctor Cornelsen
- Rudolf Fernau as Rodegger
- Rolf Moebius as Hans Günther
- Carl Kuhlmann as Walldorf
- Rudolf Platte as Buttje
- Hans Brausewetter as Berg
- Aribert Mog as Wilke
- Eberhard Leithoff as Nierweg
- Volker von Collande as Rapp
- Eduard Wenck as Reinicke
- Alexander Engel as Cadoni
- Lina Carstens as Frau Florian
- Traute Rose as Singer

== Bibliography ==
- Klaus, Ulrich J. Deutsche Tonfilme: Jahrgang 1939. Klaus-Archiv, 1988.
- Rentschler, Eric. The Ministry of Illusion: Nazi Cinema and Its Afterlife. Harvard University Press, 1996.
