= Peter Elsholtz =

German actor

- Born: Peter Ludwig Wilhelm Elsholtz; 20 October 1907; Berlin, German Empire
- Died: 30 August 1977 (aged 69); West Berlin, West Germany
- Occupation: Actor
- Years active: 1936–1957
- Children: Edith; Arne

Peter Ludwig Wilhelm Elsholtz (20 October 1907 – 30 August 1977) was a German stage actor, film actor, voice actor and dubbing director.

== Selected filmography ==
- Schlußakkord (1936)
- The Castle in Flanders (1936) - Lincoln
- Ride to Freedom (1937) - Adjutant des Gouverneurs
- Truxa (1937) - Truxa, Artist
- The Ruler (1937) - Ingenieur Dr. Ehrhardt
- The Citadel of Warsaw (1937) - Botkin - sein Adjutant
- The Mountain Calls (1938) - Giordano
- Revolutionary Wedding (1938) - Prosper
- The Woman at the Crossroads (1938) - Brandes
- Shadows Over St. Pauli (1938) - Martens
- By a Silken Thread (1938) - Passagier auf dem Rückkehrschiff
- Two Women (1938) - Autorennfahrer
- Adventure in Love (1938) - Girolais, Kriminalkommissar
- Man for Man (1939) - Otto Sens
- Robert Koch (1939) - Virchows Sekretär Dr. Karl Wetzel
- Dein Leben gehört mir (1939)
- Maria Ilona (1939) - Pista, der Bärenbändiger
- Der letzte Appell (1939)
- The Fox of Glenarvon (1940) - Tim Malory
- The Three Codonas (1940) - Rastelli
- Achtung! Feind hört mit! (1940) - Bocks Agent im Trenchcoat
- Ritorno (1940)
- Traummusik (1940) - Hermann, Trompeter
- Counterfeiters (1940) - Fälscher
- Blutsbrüderschaft (1941) - Bertram
- Alarm (1941) - Warenhausdetektiv
- My Life for Ireland (1941) - Dr. v. Krisis
- Above All Else in the World (1941) - Dr. v. Krisis
- Riding for Germany (1941) - Deutscher Ulan
- Venus on Trial (1941) - Der Verteidiger
- Attack on Baku (1942) - Ein Leutnant, englischer Agent
- Andreas Schlüter (1942) - Der Agitator
- Front Theatre (1942) - Stabsarzt bei der 'kranken' Edith Reiß (uncredited)
- Voice of the Heart (1942) - Volontär Bolten
- Titanic (1943) - Landarbeiter Bobby (uncredited)
- When the Young Wine Blossoms (1943) - Reeder Karstens
- Melody of a Great City (1943) - Buckel, Mitarbeiter Dr. Werners
- Street Acquaintances (1948) - Marions Freund
- Verführte Hände (1949) - Dr. Gerson
- Cuba Cabana (1952) - Polizeikommissar
- Music by Night (1953) - Pilot
- Urlaub auf Ehrenwort (1955) - SS-Gruppenführer Böttcher
- Goodbye, Franziska (1957) - Anwalt
- Winnetou and Old Firehand (1966) - Puglia (voice, uncredited) (final film role)

== Bibliography ==
- Rolf Giesen. Nazi Propaganda Films: A History and Filmography. McFarland, 2003.
