= Donogoo =

1936 film

- Directed by: Henri Chomette; Reinhold Schünzel
- Written by: Georges Neveux
- Based on: Donogoo by Jules Romains
- Produced by: Raoul Ploquin; Erich von Neusser
- Starring: Renée Saint-Cyr; Raymond Rouleau; Marcel Simon
- Cinematography: Friedl Behn-Grund
- Edited by: Arnfried Heyne
- Music by: Franz Doelle; Werner Eisbrenner
- Production company: UFA
- Distributed by: L'Alliance Cinématographique Européenne
- Release date: 10 April 1936
- Running time: 89 minutes
- Countries: France; Germany
- Language: French

Donogoo is a 1936 French-German comedy film directed by Henri Chomette and Reinhold Schünzel and starring Renée Saint-Cyr, Raymond Rouleau and Marcel Simon. It was produced and distributed by the French subsidiary of Germany's UFA. Shooting took place at the Babelsberg Studios in Berlin. The film's sets were designed by the art directors Otto Hunte and Willy Schiller.

== Cast ==
- Renée Saint-Cyr as Josette
- Raymond Rouleau as Pierre
- Nono Lecorre as Albert
- Adrien Le Gallo as Le Trouhadec
- Marcel Simon as Margajat
- Auguste Bovério as Rufisque
- Mona Lys as Jeanette
- Pierre Alcover as Sabourin
- Fred Pasquali as Le garçon de café
- Jean Sinoël as Goujon

== Bibliography ==
- Bessy, Maurice & Chirat, Raymond. Histoire du cinéma français: encyclopédie des films, Volume 2. Pygmalion, 1986.
- Bock, Hans-Michael & Töteberg, Michael. Das Ufa-Buch. Zweitausendeins, 1992.
- Crisp, Colin. Genre, Myth and Convention in the French Cinema, 1929-1939. Indiana University Press, 2002.
- Jacobsen, Wolfgang. Babelsberg: ein Filmstudio 1912-1992. Argon, 1992.
- Rège, Philippe. Encyclopedia of French Film Directors, Volume 1. Scarecrow Press, 2009.
