= Carl Kuhlmann =

German actor

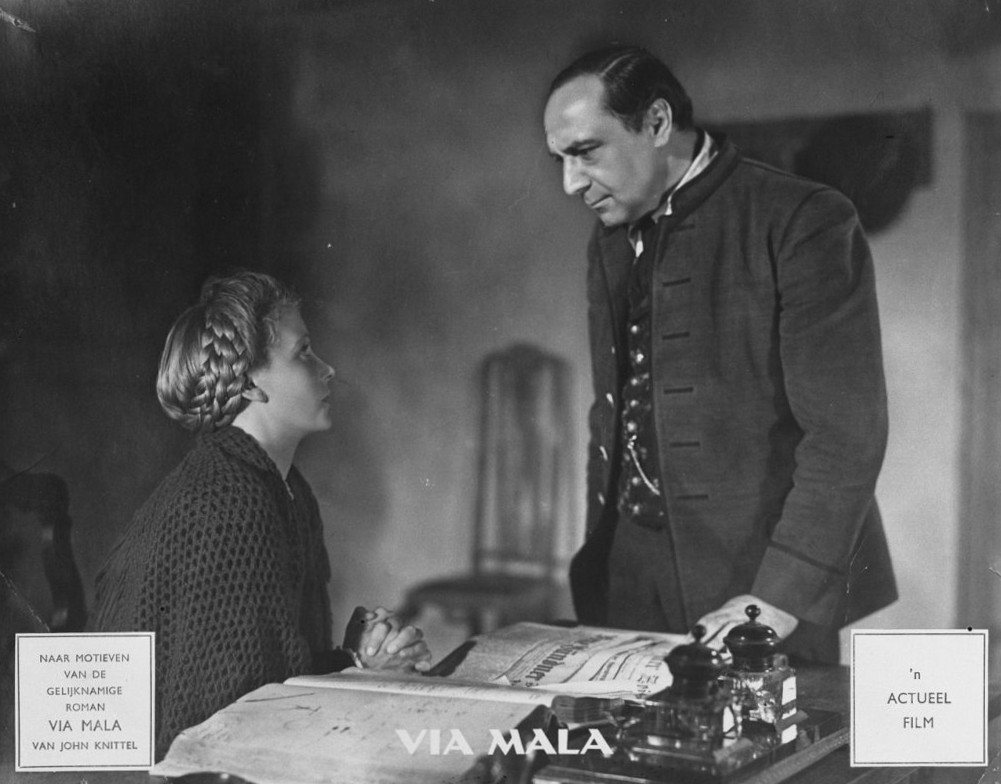
- Born: 25 April 1899; Bremen, German Empire
- Died: 18 July 1962 (aged 63); West Berlin, West Germany
- Occupation: Actor
- Years active: 1937 - 1962 (film)

Carl Kuhlmann (25 April 1899 – 18 July 1962) was a German stage and film actor. He played the role of Nathan Mayer Rothschild in the antisemitic historical film The Rothschilds (1940) which was made as an anti-Jewish, anti-British propaganda films during the Second World War.

== Selected filmography ==
- La Habanera (1937)
- By a Silken Thread (1938)
- The Curtain Falls (1939)
- Man for Man (1939)
- The Rothschilds (1940)
- Women Are Better Diplomats (1941)
- Voice of the Heart (1942)
- Vienna 1910 (1943)
- Nora (1944)
- Via Mala (1945)
- The Years Pass (1945)
- Trouble Backstairs (1949)

== Bibliography ==
- Richards, Jeffrey. Visions of Yesterday. Routledge, 2014.
