= Arne Elsholtz =

German voice actor (1944–2016)

- Born: 14 August 1944; Pritzwalk, German Reich
- Died: 26 April 2016 (aged 71); Berlin, Germany
- Occupations: Actor; voice actor; dialogue script writer; dubbing director
- Years active: 1964–2016
- Children: 1
- Father: Peter Elsholtz
- Relatives: Edith Elsholtz (sister)

Arne Elsholtz (14 August 1944 – 26 April 2016) was a German voice actor and dialogue director. He was one of the most well-known dubbing actors in Germany and he was also responsible for directing the German dubs of some international productions.

== Biography ==
Elsholtz was born in Pritzwalk to actors Peter Elsholtz and Karin Vielmetter and he was the younger brother of actress Edith Elsholtz. Due to the connections his father had in the acting industry, Elsholtz began training as an actor with Marlise Ludwig in Berlin, where he would later act on stage. He eventually found a talent for dubbing and directing voices since 1964 and he quickly built up a reputation as one of the most powerful voice dubbers in Germany. Among the actors he dubbed included Tom Hanks, Bill Murray, Jeff Goldblum, Kevin Kline and Eric Idle.

Elsholtz dubbed Hanks in his award-winning performances, which includes Philadelphia and Forrest Gump. His other roles include Steve Guttenberg and Matt McCoy's roles in the Police Academy films. He also dubbed Joseph Marcell's role as Geoffrey Butler in The Fresh Prince of Bel Air (from which he also served as a dialogue director) and Sam Hui as King Kong in Aces Go Places. He dubbed many of Eric Idle's roles in many of the Monty Python films.

In Elsholtz's animated dub roles, he provided the German voice of Manny in the Ice Age films (excluding the fifth film, as he died before the German dub production was complete) and Hades in the 1997 Disney film Hercules and the subsequent television series as well as Lord Macintosh in Brave, Tom Hanks' characters in The Polar Express and Danger Mouse.

As a voice director, Elsholtz had directed the German voice dubs of many foreign films and television shows. These include The Godfather Saga, The Empire Strikes Back, Return of the Jedi, E.T. the Extra-Terrestrial and many more. His career was an actor was rare, but he had on-screen appearances on Escape from East Berlin. He also served as a commentator and announcer for commercials and radio shows such as Verona Pooth's Sat.1 variety show. From 2001 until 2003, he provided the German commentary for the Wer wird Millionär? video games.

== Death ==
Elsholtz died in a Berlin hospital on 26 April 2016, at the age of 71.
