= Ludwig Elsholtz =

German painter

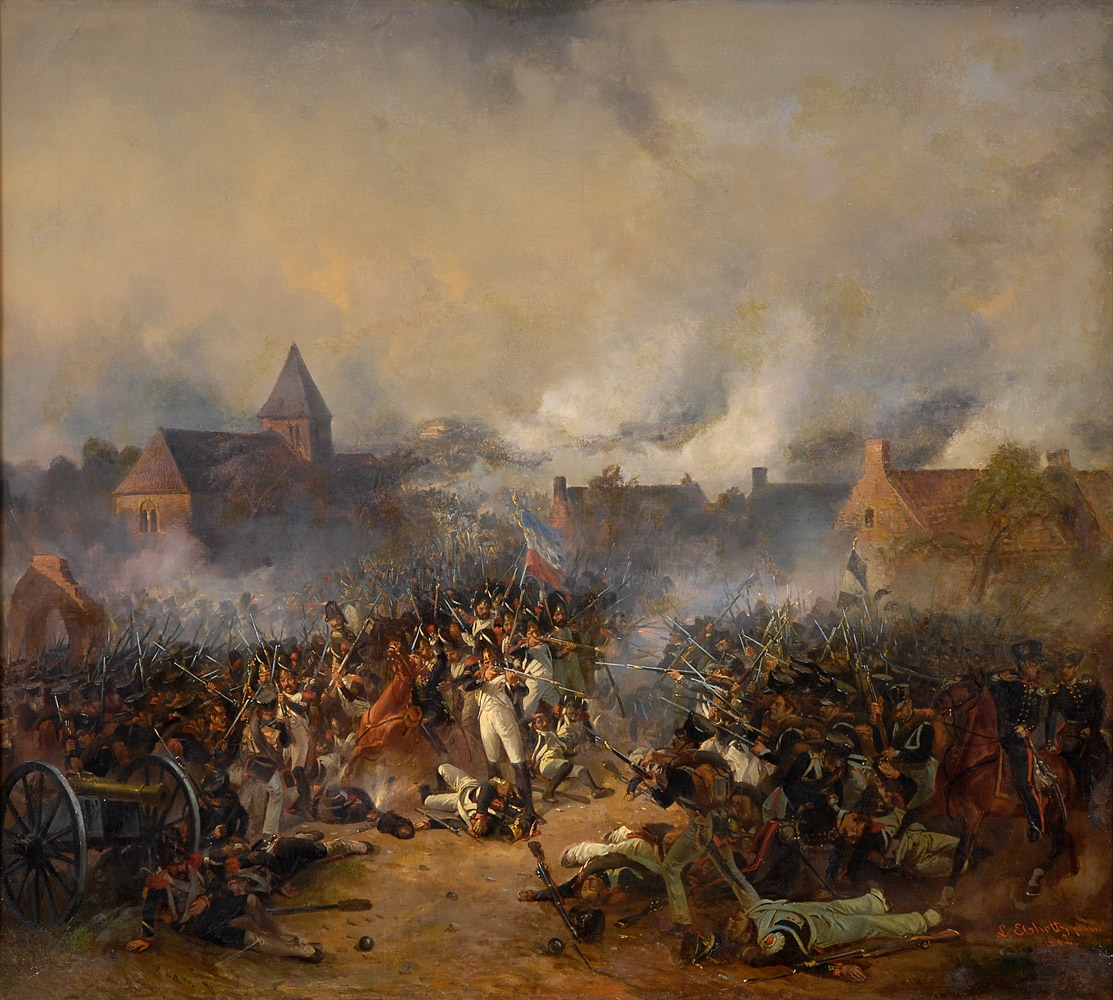
Capture of Plancenoit in 1815, painting from 1843

Ludwig Elsholtz (1805–1850), a German painter of genre subjects and battles, born at Berlin, studied in the Academy of his native city, and afterwards in the studio of Franz Krüger, the painter of horses. His best work is The Battle of Leipsic, painted in 1833, and now in the possession of the German Emperor. He died at Berlin in 1850. In the Berlin National Gallery is The Beginning of the Fight, dated 1834.

== See also ==
- List of German painters
