= Karl Haacker =

German art director

- Born: 25 July 1890; Berlin, German Empire
- Died: 15 December 1945 (aged 55); Berlin, Germany
- Occupation: Art Director
- Years active: 1929–1942 (film)

Karl Haacker (25 July 1890 – 15 December 1945) was a German art director active in designing film sets during the Weimar and Nazi eras. He is sometimes credited as Carl Haacker.

== Selected filmography ==
- The Student of Prague (1935)
- I Love All the Women (1935)
- A Wedding Dream (1936)
- The Night With the Emperor (1936)
- An Enemy of the People (1937)
- Dangerous Game (1937)
- The Citadel of Warsaw (1937)
- A Girl Goes Ashore (1938)
- Nanette (1940)
- Beloved Augustin (1940)
- Our Miss Doctor (1940)

== Bibliography ==
- Lotte H. Eisner. The Haunted Screen: Expressionism in the German Cinema and the Influence of Max Reinhardt. University of California Press, 2008.
