= Julius Stinde =

German writer (1841–1905)

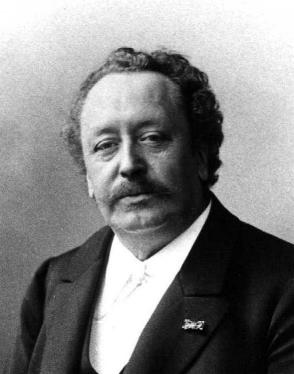
Julius Stinde.

Julius Stinde (28 August 1841 – 5 August 1905), was a German author born at Kirchnüchel in Holstein, the son of a clergyman.

Having attended the gymnasium at Eutin, he was apprenticed in 1858 to a chemist in Lübeck. He soon tired of the shop, and went to study chemistry at Kiel, Jena and Giessen where he proceeded to the degree of PhD. In 1863 Stinde received an appointment as consulting chemist to a large industrial undertaking in Hamburg; but, becoming editor of the Hamburger Gewerbeblatt, he gradually transferred his energies to journalism.

His earliest works were little comedies, dealing with Hamburg life, though he continued to make scientific contributions to various journals. In 1876 Stinde settled in Berlin and began the series of stories of the Buchholz family, vivid and humorous studies of Berlin middle-class life by which he is most widely known. He died at Olsberg.

The first of the series Buchholzens in Italien (translated by HF Powell, 1887) appeared in 1883 and achieved an immense success. It was followed by Die Familie Buchholz in 1884 (translated by LD Schmitz, 1885); Frau Buchholz im Orient in 1888; Frau Wilhelmine (Der Familie Buchholz letzter Teil; translated by HF Powell, 1887) in 1886; Wilhelmine Buchholz Memoiren, in 1894; and Hotel Buchholz; Ausstellungserlebnisse der Frau Wilhelmine Buchholz, in 1896.

Under the pseudonyms of Alfred de Valmy, Wilhelmine Buchholz and Richard E Ward, he also published various other works of more or less merit. His Waldnovellen (1881) have been translated into English.
