= Trouble Backstairs =

Trouble Backstairs (German:Krach im Hinterhaus) may refer to:

- Trouble Backstairs (play), a German play by Maximilian Böttcher
- Trouble Backstairs (1935 film), a German film directed by Veit Harlan
- Trouble Backstairs (1949 film), a German film directed by Erich Kobler
