= A Waltz with You =

1943 film

- Directed by: Hubert Marischka
- Written by: Hubert Marischka
- Produced by: Friedrich Wilhelm Gaik
- Starring: Lizzi Waldmüller; Albert Matterstock; Grethe Weiser
- Cinematography: Oskar Schnirch
- Edited by: Margarete Steinborn
- Music by: Franz Grothe
- Production company: Berlin Film
- Distributed by: Deutsche Filmvertriebs
- Release date: 12 February 1943
- Running time: 88 minutes
- Country: Germany
- Language: German

A Waltz with You (German: Ein Walzer mit dir) is a 1943 German musical comedy film directed by Hubert Marischka and starring Lizzi Waldmüller, Albert Matterstock and Grethe Weiser. It was shot at the Althoff Studios in Berlin. The film's sets were designed by the art directors Gustav A. Knauer and Arthur Schwarz.

== Cast ==
- Lizzi Waldmüller as Maria Brandt-Hellmer
- Albert Matterstock as Hans Helmer
- Grethe Weiser as Lotte Lindt - Soubrette
- Rudolf Platte as Kunstmaler Willi Kenter, Freund von Hans Hellmer
- Lucie Englisch as Anna, Hausmädchen im Hause Hellmer
- Hans Leibelt as Direktor Wolter, vom neuen Operetten-Theater
- Albert Florath as Krebs, Direktor des Furioso-Musikverlags
- Kurt Seifert as Müller, Direktor des Weltverlags
- Günther Lüders as Inspizient Schnell
- Walter Müller as Kapellmeister Paul Struck, Verehrer Lottes
- Rudolf Schündler as Schmalfuß, Angestellter im Furioso-Verlag
- Klaus Pohl as Der Sekretär im Furioso-Verlag
- Traute Bengen as Eine Theaterangestellte in der Kulisse
- Egon Brosig as Der ignorante Theaterbesucher
- Harry Frank as Anitas Partner in der Revue "Ich liebe Dich"
- Fred Goebel as Ein Angestellter im Furioso-Verlag
- Lotte Rausch as Das Mädchen im Gasthof "Zur weißen Taube"

== Bibliography ==
- Klaus, Ulrich J. Deutsche Tonfilme: Jahrgang 1942. Klaus-Archiv, 1988.
- Romani, Cinzia. Tainted Goddesses : Female Film Stars of the Third Reich. Da Capo Press, 1992.
