= Don't Play with Love =

1949 film

- Paul Klinger and Bruni Löbel
- Directed by: Hans Deppe
- Written by: Gustav Kampendonk (play); Karl Georg Külb
- Produced by: Artur Brauner; Max Koslowski
- Starring: Lil Dagover; Albrecht Schoenhals; Bruni Löbel
- Cinematography: Ekkehard Kyrath
- Edited by: Johanna Meisel
- Music by: Franz Grothe
- Production company: CCC Films
- Distributed by: Schorcht Filmverleih
- Release date: 23 November 1949
- Running time: 89 minutes
- Country: West Germany
- Language: German

Don't Play with Love (German: Man spielt nicht mit der Liebe) is a 1949 West German comedy film directed by Hans Deppe and starring Lil Dagover, Albrecht Schoenhals and Bruni Löbel. It was shot at the Althoff Studios in Berlin. The film's sets were designed by the art director Willi Herrmann.

== Cast ==
- Lil Dagover as Florentine Alvensleben
- Albrecht Schoenhals as Eduard Caroly
- Bruni Löbel as Friedel
- Paul Klinger as Walter Ulrich / Wupp
- Petra Peters as Wanja
- Georg Thomalla as Peter
- Ethel Reschke as Eva
- Horst Gentzen as Wolke
- Alexa von Porembsky as Frau Pleßmann
- Else Reval as Frau Meyer
- Else Ehser as Souffleuse
- Egon Ziesemer as Intendant
- Joe Furtner as Reiseleiter
- Friedrich Honna as Dicker Mann
- Otto Stoeckel as Spediteur
- Fred Falckenberg as Mitropa-Kellner
- Inge van der Straaten
- Ewald Wenck as Spediteur
- Herbert Weissbach

== Bibliography ==
- Bock, Hans-Michael & Bergfelder, Tim. The Concise Cinegraph: Encyclopaedia of German Cinema. Berghahn Books, 2009.
