= All Lies (film) =

1938 film

- German film poster
- German: Lauter Lügen
- Directed by: Heinz Rühmann
- Written by: Hans Schweikart (play); Erich Ebermayer; Bernd Hofmann
- Produced by: Hans Conradi
- Starring: Albert Matterstock; Hertha Feiler; Fita Benkhoff; Hilde Weissner
- Cinematography: Carl Drews
- Edited by: Gottlieb Madl
- Music by: Michael Jary
- Production company: Terra Film
- Distributed by: Terra Film
- Release date: 23 December 1938
- Running time: 87 minutes
- Country: Germany
- Language: German

All Lies (German: Lauter Lügen) is a 1938 German comedy film directed by Heinz Rühmann and starring Albert Matterstock, Hertha Feiler and Fita Benkhoff. It marked the directorial debut of Rühmann, a popular comedy star of the era.

It was shot at the Terra Studios in Berlin. Location shooting took place in Potsdam, Innsbruck and the Tierpark Hagenbeck in Hamburg. The film's sets were designed by the art director Willi Herrmann.

== Plot ==
A wife waiting for her racing driver husband to return home after recovering from a serious crash is intrigued by the appearance of a mysterious woman who claims to be in a relationship with him.

== Cast ==
- Albert Matterstock as Andreas von Doerr
- Hertha Feiler as Garda von Doerr
- Fita Benkhoff as Elisabeth
- Hilde Weissner as Joan Bennet
- Johannes Riemann as Dr. Algys
- Just Scheu as Dr. Spitzkötter
- Eberhard Leithoff as Theobald
- Rolf von Nauckhoff as Paul, Lawyer
- Ursula Ulrich as Bettina
- Paul Bildt as Dr. Nägeli
- Charlotte Witthauer as Mrs. Müller
- Lucia Lumera as Lina
- Wolfgang Staudte as barmixer
- Georg A. Profé as dancer
- Wera Schultz as maid
