= Heinz Lausch =

- Born: 6 June 1920; Berlin, Germany
- Died: 10 September 1996 (aged 76); Berlin, Germany
- Occupation: Actor
- Years active: 1944-1990 (film & TV)

Heinz Lausch (1920–1996) was a German stage and film actor. He starred with Bruni Löbel in the 1947 rubble film comedy No Place for Love.

== Selected filmography ==
- Young Hearts (1944)
- Kolberg (1945)
- No Place for Love (1947)
- Thank You, I'm Fine (1948)
- Once on the Rhine (1952)
- Life Begins at Seventeen (1953)
- Sun Over the Adriatic (1954)
- You Can No Longer Remain Silent (1955)
- As Long as the Roses Bloom (1956)
- Freddy, the Guitar and the Sea (1959)
- Rommel Calls Cairo (1959)

== Bibliography ==
- Noack, Frank. Veit Harlan: The Life and Work of a Nazi Filmmaker. University Press of Kentucky, 2016.
