= Herti Kirchner =

German actress (1913–1939)

- Born: 3 September 1913; Kiel, Germany
- Died: 1 May 1939 (aged 25); Berlin, Germany
- Occupation: Actress
- Years active: 1932–1939

Herti Kirchner (3 September 1913 – 1 May 1939) was a German actress. She appeared in twenty-five films between 1932 and 1939.

== Selected filmography ==
- Eight Girls in a Boat (1932)
- Gretel Wins First Prize (1933)
- Pappi (1934)
- The Mysterious Mister X (1936)
- Who's Kissing Madeleine? (1939)
- The Leghorn Hat (1939)
