= Pappi (film) =

1934 film directed by Arthur Maria Rabenalt

- German film poster
- Directed by: Arthur Maria Rabenalt
- Written by: Axel Eggebrecht; Sybille Pietzsch; Arthur Maria Rabenalt
- Produced by: Frank Clifford
- Starring: Viktor de Kowa; Hilde Weissner; Petra Unkel
- Cinematography: Herbert Körner
- Edited by: Waldemar Gaede
- Music by: Walter Ulfig
- Production company: Lloyd-Film
- Distributed by: Neue Deutsch Lichtspiel-Syndikat Verleih
- Release date: 4 May 1934
- Country: Germany
- Language: German

Pappi is a 1934 German comedy film directed by Arthur Maria Rabenalt and starring Viktor de Kowa, Hilde Weissner and Petra Unkel. It is part of the circus film genre.

The film's sets were designed by the art director Hermann Warm.

== Cast ==
- Viktor de Kowa as Hans Werner
- Hilde Weissner as Jenny Anderson
- Petra Unkel as Lilly
- Emilia Unda as Aunt Anna
- Hans Deppe as Willibald Bisam
- Hans Sternberg as Gastwirt Krüger
- Josef Dahmen as Fred
- Josef Sieber as Lehmann
- Rudolf Platte as Der Mann
- Herti Kirchner as Die Frau
- Maria Krahn as Frau von Keller
