= Louise Dumont =

German actress and theater director

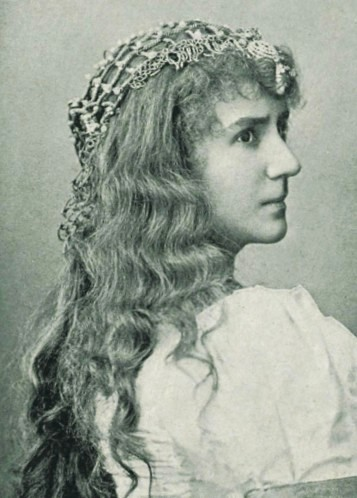
- Born: Louise Maria Hubertine Heynen; 22 February 1862; Cologne, Kingdom of Prussia
- Died: 16 May 1932 (aged 70); Düsseldorf, Germany
- Occupation: actor
- Years active: 1888 -
- Spouse: Gustav Lindemann

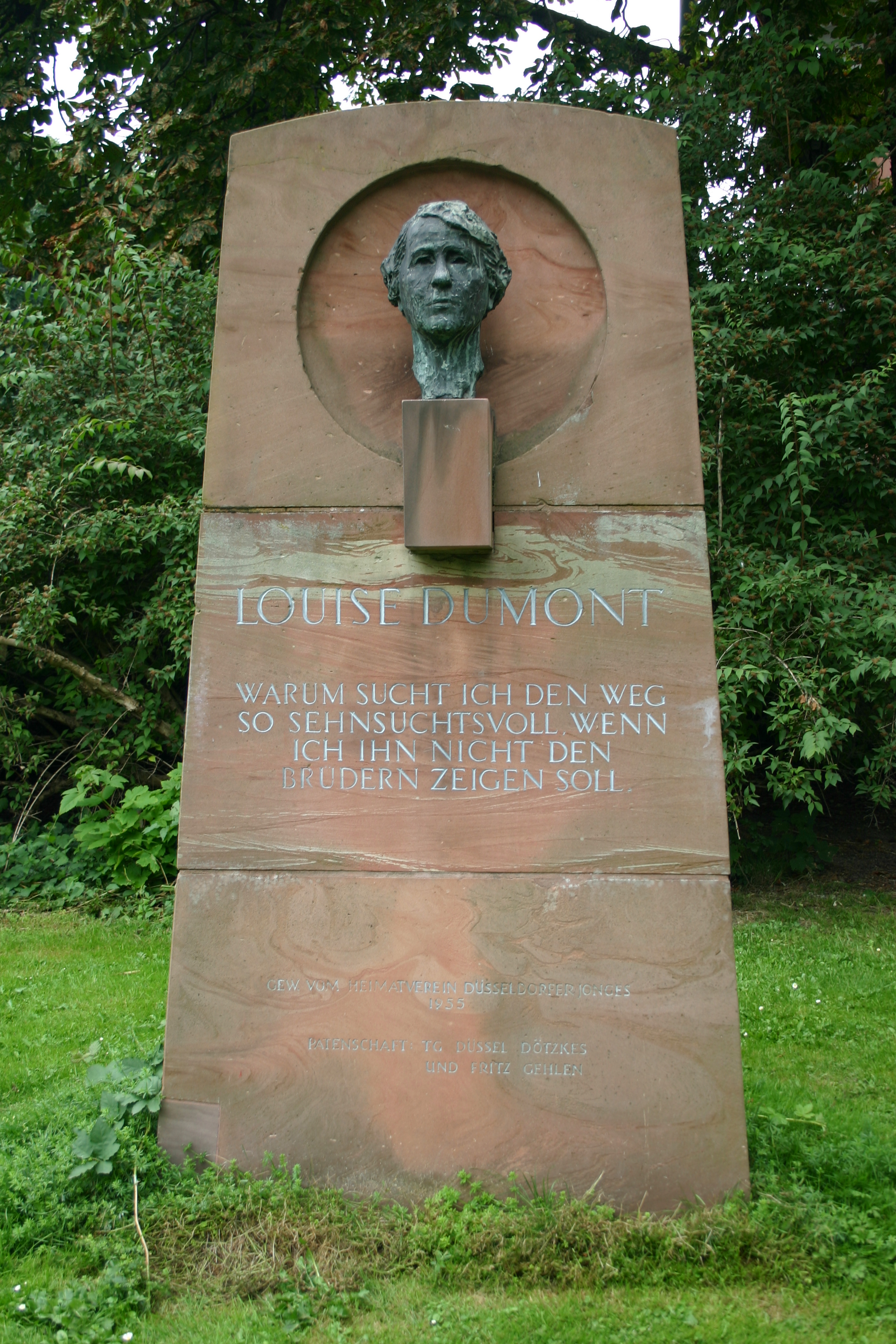
Dumont's bust in the Düsseldorf's Hofgarten. The bust was stolen in December 2012.

Louise Dumont (née Louise Maria Hubertine Heynen; 22 February 1862, in Cologne – 16 May 1932, in Düsseldorf) was a German actress and theater director.

== Life ==
Louise Maria Hubertine Heynen, born on 22 February 1862 in Cologne near Neumarkt, was the second of eleven or twelve siblings. Her parents were the merchant Christian Joseph Hubert Heynen (born in 1837) and Maria Elisabeth Elise Dumont (born 1836 or 1837). By 1879, Louise was working as a seamstress, following her father's second bankruptcy. Louise Dumont auditioned in 1882 at the Residenz Theater in Berlin, where she received her first role. As her artist's name she chose her mother's maiden name, Dumont. In 1888, she won an engagement at the Royal Court Theatre in Stuttgart, where she became acquainted with and a friend of Queen Charlotte of Wurttemberg. In 1898 Dumont left Stuttgart in order to join the Deutsches Theatre in Berlin, where she achieved her greatest successes, especially as a performer of pieces by Henrik Ibsen.

In 1903, she met Gustav Lindemann, who she would marry a few years later. As it was not possible for them to establish a theatre in Berlin because of local court intrigues, they then attempted to do so in Darmstadt, also without success. They finally succeeded in Düsseldorf, where Dumont and Lindemann founded the Schauspielhaus Düsseldorf on 16 June 1904, as a direct competitor to the municipal theatre. Dumont and Lindemann both contributed financially to the project, as did ten members of prestigious families like the Poensgens and the Luegs. The theatre opened on October 28, 1905, to which a theatre academy was later added. The academy trained a number of actors who significantly influenced German theatre life, such as Gustaf Gründgens, Peter Esser, Adolf Dell, Paul Henckels, Thea von Harbou, Paul Kemp, Wolfgang Langhoff, Maria Alex and Henry Orthmayer.

In 1907, Louise Dumont married Gustav Lindemann. They separated in the 1920s, after which Dumont was attached to a number of young actresses, including Fita Benkhoff, Hanni Hoessrich and Luise Rainer. It has been presumed that she was bisexual.

== Assessment ==
Louise Dumont is considered the 20th century successor to Friederike Caroline Neuber. She exerted less of a mimic-erotic fascination than a strong, convincing and defining gravity, which she understood as performing faithful service to the words of the author.

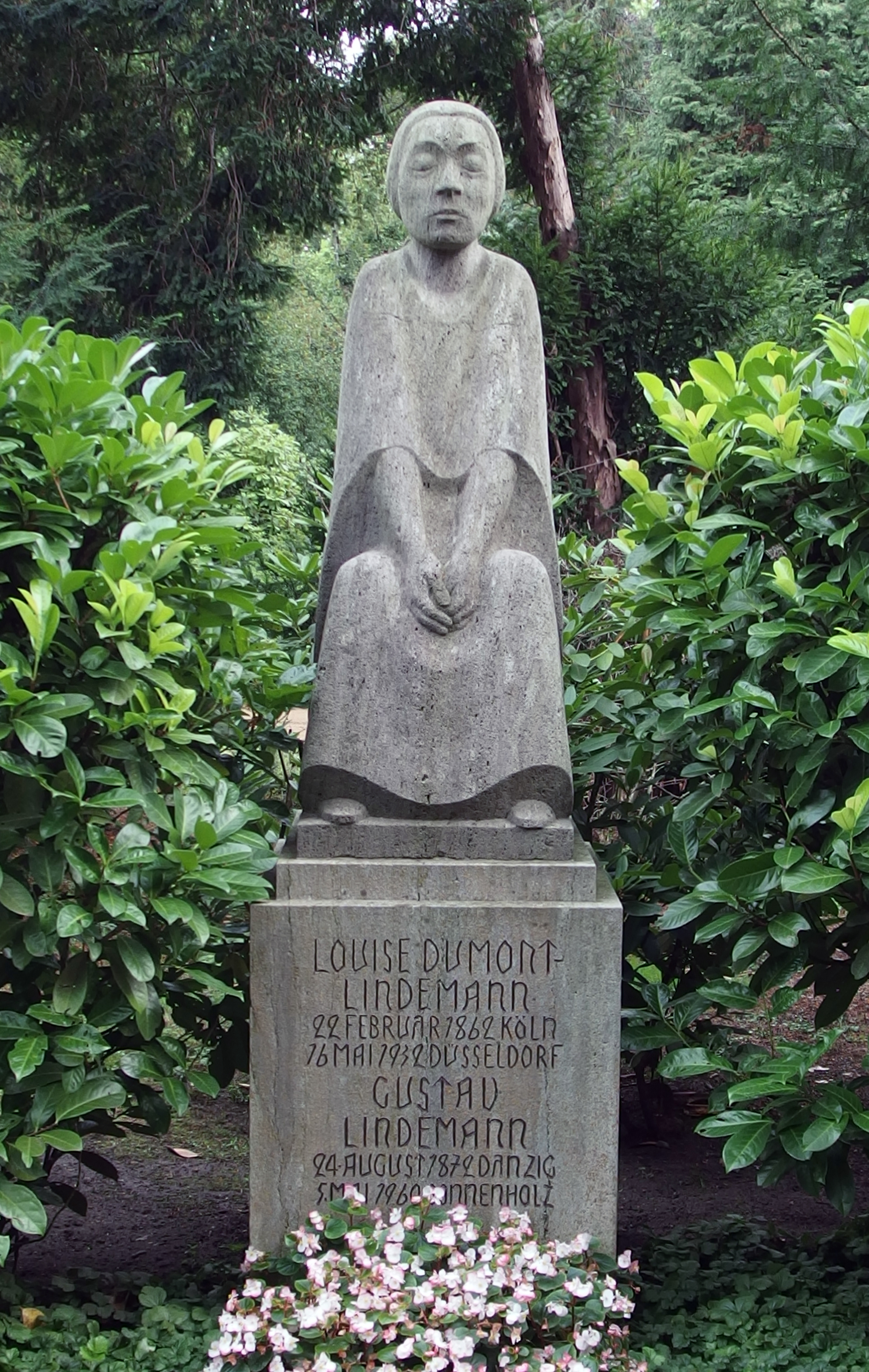
Gravestone of Louise Dumont and Gustav Lindemann, Nordfriedhof Düsseldorf

Dumont died in 1932 in Düsseldorf and was buried in the local cemetery. Her grave is decorated with a sculpture by Ernst Barlach. Her husband donated in her memory a necklace with a pearl-encircled topas that she had received as a present from Queen Charlotte of Württemberg, to be awarded to outstanding actresses during their lifetime. In 1976 she was featured on a postage stamp issued by the Deutsche Bundespost. The Louise-Dumont-Straße in Düsseldorf-Pempelfort was named after her.
