= Her Private Secretary =

1940 film

- Directed by: Charles Klein
- Written by: H.W. Becker; Hertha von Gebhardt
- Based on: Haus Kiepergaß und seine Gäste by Hannes Peter Stolp
- Produced by: Hans von Wolzogen
- Starring: Gustav Fröhlich; Fita Benkhoff; Theo Lingen; Maria Andergast
- Cinematography: Otto Baecker
- Edited by: Friedel Buckow
- Music by: Friedrich Schröder
- Production company: Fabrikation Deutscher Filme
- Distributed by: Märkische Film
- Release date: 22 February 1940
- Running time: 88 minutes
- Country: Germany
- Language: German

Her Private Secretary (German: Ihr Privatsekretär) is a 1940 German comedy crime film directed by Charles Klein and starring Gustav Fröhlich, Fita Benkhoff, Theo Lingen and Maria Andergast. It was shot at the Grunewald Studios in Berlin and on location at the Schloss Dammsmühle in Brandenburg. The film's sets were designed by the art directors Erich Grave and Fritz Lück.

== Synopsis ==
When a charming young man arrives to serve as a private secretary for the eccentric Helene Kiepergass a, he quickly becomes entangled in a series of mysterious events in her house. Amidst the arrival of a suspicious "nephew" from Mexico and a house full of peculiar guests, a romance blossoms between the secretary and the lovely companion Mary. He eventually is able to unmask two confidence tricksters amidst the residents.

== Cast ==
- Gustav Fröhlich as Der Privatsekretär
- Fita Benkhoff as Frau Helene Kiepergass
- Theo Lingen as Dr. Kiesewetter
- Maria Andergast as Mary, die Gesellschafterin
- Rudolf Carl as Bert, der 'Neffe' aus Mexiko
- Paul Henckels as Tobias Kiepergass, der Ehegatte
- Carsta Löck as Frau Kiesewetter
- Gaston Briese as Wirt
- Hans Meyer-Hanno as Gendarm
- Lotte Rausch as Wirtin
- Alfred Stratmann as Ein Bauer
- Hubert von Meyerinck as Auktionator
- Eduard Wenck as Apotheker
- Ewald Wenck as Bürgermeister

== Bibliography ==
- Goble, Alan. The Complete Index to Literary Sources in Film. Walter de Gruyter, 1999.
- Klaus, Ulrich J. Deutsche Tonfilme: Jahrgang 1936. Klaus-Archiv, 1988.
- Aurich, Rolf & Jacobsen, Wolfgang . Theo Lingen: das Spiel mit der Maske : Biographie. Aufbau, 2008.
