= Peter Francke =

German screenwriter

- Born: 4 February 1897; Berlin, German Empire
- Died: January 1978 (aged 80); Munich, West Germany
- Occupation: Writer
- Years active: 1933-1966 (film)

Peter Francke (1897-1978) was a German screenwriter. He wrote the screenplay for The Girl from Barnhelm (1940), an adaptation of a play by Gotthold Ephraim Lessing.

== Selected filmography ==
- Happy Days in Aranjuez (1933)
- The Voice of Love (1934)
- Holiday From Myself (1934)
- The Saint and Her Fool (1935)
- Miracle of Flight (1935)
- Hero for a Night (1935)
- The Monastery's Hunter (1935)
- City of Anatol (1936)
- The Haunted Castle (1936)
- Wells in Flames (1937)
- Comrades at Sea (1938)
- Water for Canitoga (1939)
- The Governor (1939)
- A Woman Like You (1939)
- The Girl from Barnhelm (1940)
- Comrades (1941)
- What Does Brigitte Want? (1941)
- Beloved World (1942)
- I Need You (1944)
- A Man Like Maximilian (1945)
- Maresi (1948)
- The Disturbed Wedding Night (1950)
- Regimental Music (1950)
- Toxi (1952)
- Carnival in White (1952)
- Holiday From Myself (1952)
- Stars Over Colombo (1953)
- The Country Schoolmaster (1954)
- Spring Song (1954)
- In Hamburg When the Nights Are Long (1956)

== Bibliography ==
- Fischer, Barbara & Fox, Thomas C. A Companion to the Works of Gotthold Ephraim Lessing. Camden House, 2005.
- Klossner, Michael. The Europe of 1500-1815 on Film and Television. McFarland & Co, 2002.
