= Gerda Maria Terno =

German actress (1909–1995)

- Born: 10 July 1909; Berlin, German Empire
- Died: 31 July 1995 (aged 86); Düsseldorf, Germany
- Occupation: Actress
- Years active: 1938-1949 (film)

Gerda Maria Terno (10 July 1909 - 31 July 1995) was a German stage and film actress. She starred in the 1941 Nazi propaganda film Blood-Brotherhood and made other sporadic film appearances although much of her work was in the theatre. She was also a noted voice actress, dubbing foreign films for release in Germany.

== Selected filmography ==
- Yvette (1938)
- Bachelor's Paradise (1939)
- The Leghorn Hat (1939)
- My Daughter Doesn't Do That (1940)
- Blood-Brotherhood (1941)
- My Friend Josephine (1942)
- Melody of a Great City (1943)
- A Man With Principles? (1943)
- Derby (1949)

== Bibliography ==
- Giesen, Rolf. Nazi Propaganda Films: A History and Filmography. McFarland & Co, 2003.
