= Dance into Happiness (1951 film) =

1951 film

- Directed by: Alfred Stöger
- Written by: Robert Bodanzky (libretto); Fritz Koselka; Lilian Belmont
- Produced by: Alfred Stöger
- Starring: Johannes Heesters; Lucie Englisch; Waltraut Haas
- Cinematography: Herbert Geier; Kurt Schulz
- Edited by: Walter von Bonhorst
- Music by: Robert Stolz (operetta); Michael Jary
- Production company: Wiener Mundus-Film
- Distributed by: Herzog Filmverleih
- Release date: 20 October 1951
- Running time: 98 minutes
- Country: Austria
- Language: German

Dance into Happiness (German: Tanz ins Glück) is a 1951 Austrian musical comedy film directed by Alfred Stöger and starring Johannes Heesters, Lucie Englisch and Waltraut Haas. It is an operetta film, based on Whirled into Happiness composed by Robert Stolz. It was shot in Agfacolor. It was made at the Tempelhof Studios in West Berlin and on location around Bregenz and nearby Lake Constance in Vorarlberg. The film's sets were designed by the art director Gabriel Pellon. It premiered on 20 October 1951 in Hanover and was not released in Austria until its release in Vienna on 26 February 1952.

== Synopsis ==
Celebrated South American operetta singer Pedro Domingo returns to Europe after many years. He meets and falls in love with Rosmarie, a promising young singer, and invites her to tour with him. Their romance is threatened by the return of one of his flames, Inez Cavalcante from South America, and her conniving mother.

== Cast ==
- Johannes Heesters as Pedro Domingo
- Lucie Englisch as Rose vom Feuerkogel
- Waltraut Haas as Rosmarie Reisdorfer
- Ursula Lingen as Inez Cavalcante
- Annie Maier as Lola Quandtner
- Grethe Weiser as Mira Cavalcante
- Ulrich Bettac as Pablo Ferreira
- Beppo Brem as Portier
- Joseph Egger as Heinz Falkenhayn
- Fritz Imhoff as Hyazinth Quandtner
- Hans Richter as Antonio Vicente
- Wolfgang Birk as Willy Hardt
- Ewald Wenck as Feuerwehrmann
- Walter Gross as Feuerwehrmann
- Grete Sellier as Solotänzerin

== Bibliography ==
- Fritsche, Maria. Homemade Men in Postwar Austrian Cinema: Nationhood, Genre and Masculinity. Berghahn Books, 2013.
