= The Mysterious Mister X =

- Directed by: J.A. Hübler-Kahla
- Written by: Paul Armont (play); Marcel Gerbidon (play); Jean Manoussi (play); Friedrich Dammann
- Produced by: Lothar Stark
- Starring: Ralph Arthur Roberts; Annemarie Steinsieck; Herti Kirchner
- Cinematography: Georg Muschner; Paul Rischke
- Edited by: Lothar Buhle
- Music by: Jim Cowler
- Production company: Lothar Stark-Film
- Distributed by: Tobis Film
- Release date: 11 June 1936
- Country: Germany
- Language: German

The Mysterious Mister X (German: Der geheimnisvolle Mister X) is a 1936 German comedy film directed by J.A. Hübler-Kahla and starring Ralph Arthur Roberts, Annemarie Steinsieck and Herti Kirchner.

The film's sets were designed by the art director Gustav A. Knauer and Alexander Mügge.

== Synopsis ==
A British lord, fascinated by crime, spends his time collecting artefacts. He is thrilled when he receives mysterious letters warning that a thief plans to steal a valuable statue from his country house. His secretary persuades him to bring in her fiancée, a private detective, to investigate the case.

== Cast ==
- Ralph Arthur Roberts as Lord Wilford
- Mady Rahl as Nelly Taylor, Sekretärin
- Annemarie Steinsieck as Lady Wilford
- Herti Kirchner as Lilian, ihre Tochter
- Curt Ackermann as James - ihr Neffe
- Hermann Thimig as Richard Murray
- Eugen Rex as Smith, Kunsthändler
- Robert Jungk as Duncan - Hausmeister auf Schloß Wilford
- Erwin Biegel as Williams - Diener auf Schloß Wilford
- Willi Schur as Der Nachtwächter auf Schloß Wilford

== Other film versions ==
- Monsieur Breloque a disparu (1938)
- Trappola d'amore (1940)

== Bibliography ==
- Waldman, Harry. Nazi Films in America, 1933–1942. McFarland, 2008.
