= The Leghorn Hat =

1939 film

- Directed by: Wolfgang Liebeneiner
- Written by: Horst Budjuhn; Bernd Hofmann
- Based on: The Italian Straw Hat by Eugène Labiche
- Produced by: Heinz Rühmann
- Starring: Heinz Rühmann; Herti Kirchner; Christl Mardayn
- Cinematography: Carl Hoffmann; Karl Löb
- Edited by: Gottlieb Madl
- Music by: Michael Jary
- Production company: Terra Film
- Distributed by: Terra Film
- Release date: 4 April 1939
- Running time: 91 minutes
- Country: Germany
- Language: German

The Leghorn Hat (German: Der Florentiner Hut) is a 1939 German period comedy film directed by Wolfgang Liebeneiner and starring Heinz Rühmann, Herti Kirchner and Christl Mardayn. It is based on the 1851 play The Italian Straw Hat written by Eugène Labiche, which has been adapted for the screen on several occasions.

The film's sets were designed by the art directors Hans Sohnle and Wilhelm Vorwerg. It was shot at the Babelsberg Studios in Berlin. It premiered in Magdeburg on 4 April before opening at the Gloria-Palast in the capital on 18 April.

== Cast ==
- Heinz Rühmann as Theo Farina
- Herti Kirchner as Helene Barbock, seine Braut
- Christl Mardayn as Baronin Pamela v. Sarabant
- Paul Henckels as Baron Bubi v. Sarabant
- Victor Janson as Barbock
- Hannsgeorg Laubenthal as Leutnant Emil v. Parade
- Karel Štěpánek as Felix
- Gerda Maria Terno as Virginia
- Helmut Weiss as Bobby
- Hans Hermann Schaufuß as Onkel Florian
- Hubert von Meyerinck as Rosalba
- Elsa Wagner as Baronin Champigny
- Alexa von Porembsky as Clara
- Edith Meinhard as Zofe bei Baronin Champigny
- Paul Bildt as 1.Beamter
- Franz Weber as 2. Beamter
- Leopold von Ledebur as Zürus
- Bruno Fritz as Leierkastenmann
- Ernst Legal as Dienstmann
- Käthe Kamossa as Tante Walpurga

== Bibliography ==
- Waldman, Harry. Nazi Films in America, 1933-1942. McFarland, 2008.
