= That Was My Life =

1944 film

- Directed by: Paul Martin
- Written by: Stefanie von Below
- Based on: Das war mein Leben by Gustav Kampendonk
- Produced by: Ernst Garden
- Starring: Carl Raddatz; Hansi Knoteck; Leny Marenbach
- Cinematography: Ekkehard Kyrath
- Edited by: Willy Zeyn
- Music by: Michael Jary
- Production company: Berlin Film
- Distributed by: Deutsche Filmvertriebs
- Release date: 24 October 1944
- Running time: 105 minutes
- Country: Germany
- Language: German

That Was My Life (German: Das war mein Leben) is a 1944 German drama film directed by Paul Martin and starring Carl Raddatz, Hansi Knoteck and Leny Marenbach. It was shot at the Cinetone Studios in Amsterdam and the Filmstad at The Hague, both in the German-occupied Netherlands and on location in Berlin and Friedeberg. The film's sets were designed by the art directors Gustav A. Knauer and Arthur Schwarz. It was based on a novel by Gustav Kampendonk.

== Cast ==
- Carl Raddatz as Dr. Ophoven
- Hansi Knoteck as Anna Weber
- Leny Marenbach as Baronin Schark
- Franz Schafheitlin as Baron Schark
- Paul Dahlke as Dr. Berner
- Margarete Haagen as Röschen
- Thea Weis as Bärbel
- Josef Sieber as Herr Gerards
- Karl Hellmer as Apotheker
- Franz Weber as Bürgermeister
- Lisca Malbran as Ursula Berner
- Norbert Rohringer as Kurt
- Jakob Tiedtke as Müller
- Gerhard Dammann as Laurenz/Gastwirt
- Klaus Pohl as Schaffner
- Fritz Hoopts as Alter Schäfer
- Armin Münch as Dorftrottel
- Paul Rehkopf as Vater Gerards
- Bernhard Goetzke as Alter Bauer
- Karl Dannemann as Meusers/Bauer

== Bibliography ==
- Goble, Alan. The Complete Index to Literary Sources in Film. Walter de Gruyter, 1999.
- Klaus, Ulrich J. Deutsche Tonfilme: Jahrgang 1944. Klaus-Archiv, 1988.
