= Ellen Bang =

German actress (1906–1981)

- Born: 16 May 1906; Berlin, German Empire
- Died: 8 November 1981 (aged 75); Gold Coast, Australia
- Other names: Elise Anna Elfriede Ballier; Elfriede von Demandowsky; Elfriede Langenheim; Elfriede Hartlieb; Elfriede Morton
- Occupation: Actress
- Years active: 1934–1950 (film)
- Relatives: Ruby Rose (great-granddaughter)

Ellen Bang (16 May 1906 – 8 November 1981) was a German film actress. She appeared in thirty films between 1934 and 1950.

== Selected filmography ==
- Don't Lose Heart, Suzanne! (1935)
- My Friend Barbara (1937)
- The Gambler (1938)
- Yvette (1938)
- The Holm Murder Case (1938)
- The Green Emperor (1939)
- Man for Man (1939)
- New Year's Eve on Alexanderplatz (1939)
- In the Name of the People (1939)
- The Fox of Glenarvon (1940)
- I'll Carry You in My Arms (1943)
- Harald Arrives at Nine (1944)
- Somewhere in Berlin (1946)
- The Woman from Last Night (1950)
- It Began at Midnight (1951)

== Bibliography ==
- Richards, Jeffrey (1973). Visions of Yesterday. London: Routledge & K. Paul. ISBN 978-0-7100-7576-5.
