= I'll Carry You in My Arms (1943 film) =

1943 film

- Directed by: Kurt Hoffmann
- Written by: Ellen Fechner; Willy Clever
- Starring: Heli Finkenzeller; Hans Nielsen; Wolfgang Lukschy
- Cinematography: Eugen Klagemann; Fritz Arno Wagner
- Edited by: Ilse Voigt
- Music by: Hanson Milde-Meissner
- Production company: Tobis Film
- Distributed by: Deutsche Filmvertriebs
- Release date: 19 October 1943
- Running time: 85 minutes
- Country: Germany
- Language: German

I'll Carry You in My Arms (German: Ich werde dich auf Händen tragen) is a 1943 German romance film directed by Kurt Hoffmann and starring Heli Finkenzeller, Hans Nielsen and Wolfgang Lukschy.

The film's sets were designed by the art director Hermann Liebig, Gabriel Pellon and Willy Schiller.

== Cast ==
- Heli Finkenzeller as Karin Hartung
- Hans Nielsen as Dr. Hermnann Hartung
- Wolfgang Lukschy as Dr. Viktor Büchner
- Elisabeth Markus as Hedwig Wiegand
- Hans Leibelt as Hans Wiegand
- Ellen Bang as Frau Elvira
- Ilse Furstenberg as Dienstmädchen Lona
- Elsa Wagner as Frau Herbst
- Hansi Wendler as Helga Wiegand
- Ruth Lommel as Frau Sommer
- Eduard Wenck as Laborant Conrad
- John Pauls-Harding as Stefan Wiegand
- Rosi Wasinski as Fränzi
- Christa Dilthey as Fräulein Berg

== Bibliography ==
- Jill Nelmes & Jule Selbo. Women Screenwriters: An International Guide. Palgrave Macmillan, 2015.
