= The Girl from Barnhelm =

1940 film

- Directed by: Hans Schweikart
- Written by: Ernst Hasselbach; Peter Francke
- Based on: Minna von Barnhelm by Gotthold Ephraim Lessing
- Produced by: Curt Prickler
- Starring: Käthe Gold; Ewald Balser; Fita Benkhoff; Theo Lingen
- Cinematography: Carl Hoffmann
- Edited by: Gottlieb Madl
- Music by: Alois Melichar
- Production company: Bavaria Film
- Distributed by: Bavaria Film
- Release date: 18 October 1940
- Running time: 86 minutes
- Country: Germany
- Language: German

The Girl from Barnhelm (German: Das Fräulein von Barnhelm) is a 1940 German historical comedy film directed by Hans Schweikart and starring Käthe Gold, Ewald Balser and Fita Benkhoff. It was shot at the Bavaria Studios in Munich and location shooting around the Isar Valley. The film's sets were designed by the art directors Rudolf Pfenninger and Ludwig Reiber. It is an adaptation of the 1767 play Minna von Barnhelm by Gotthold Ephraim Lessing.

== Synopsis ==
During the Seven Years' War, Prussian Major von Tellheim sacrifices his own fortune to save a Saxon estate from being plundered. After the war ends he is discharged and left penniless when the government suspects his noble deed was actually due to a bribe. Believing his lost honour makes him unworthy Tellheim breaks his engagement to Minna von Barnhelm, but she tracks him down to a Berlin tavern to win him back. To test his love Minna pretends she has also lost her wealth, prompting Tellheim’s protective instincts to finally override his stubborn pride. The film concludes with a royal decree from Frederick the Great, restoring Tellheim's rank and fortune and allowing the couple to marry.

== Cast ==
- Käthe Gold as Minna von Barnhelm
- Ewald Balser as Major von Telheim
- Fita Benkhoff as Franziska
- Theo Lingen as Riccaut de la Marlinière
- Paul Dahlke as Just
- Fritz Kampers as Wachtmeister Werner
- Erich Ponto as Wirt
- Hans Leibelt as Graf Bruchsall
- Paul Wagner as Hauptmann Marloff
- Max Eckard as Cornet von Bonin
- Ernst Fritz Fürbringer as Schornow
- Albert Lippert as Prinz Heinrich
- Eduard von Winterstein as Müller Willig
- Gustav Waldau as Juwelier
- Ingolf Kuntze as Sächsischer Gesandter
- Friedrich Ulmer as Vorsitzender des Kriegsgerichts
- Annemarie Holtz as Schauspielerin
- Erna Sellmer as 1. sächsische Dame
- Lisa Helwig as 2. Sächsische Dame
- Luise Hohorst as 3. Sächsische Dame
- Else Kündinger as 4. Sächsische Dame
- Kurt Stieler as Ältester der Sächsischen Stände
- Herbert Kroll as Diener
- Otto Brefin as Sekretär
- Fritz Reiff as Stabsoffizier
- Charles Willy Kayser as 1. Offizier
- Peter Pasetti as 2. Offizier
- Werner Vogeler as Schreiber
- Julius Riedmueller as Feldjäger
- Kurt Eick as Preussischer Korporal
- Margarete Haagen as Sächsische Greisin
- Gerhard Bienert
- Walter Franck
- Luise Hoferat
- Klaus Pohl
- Friedrich Reich

== Bibliography ==
- Klossner, Michael (2002). The Europe of 1500–1815 on Film and Television. Jefferson, NC: McFarland & Co. ISBN 978-0-7864-1223-5.
