= Bernd Hofmann =

German screenwriter and film director

- Born: 23 November 1904; Elberfeld, German Empire
- Died: 4 December 1940 (aged 36); Berlin, Nazi Germany
- Occupations: Screenwriter; Director
- Years active: 1935–1940 (film)

Bernd Hofmann (23 November 1904 – 4 December 1940) was a German screenwriter and film director. He wrote and directed the 1940 film Journey to Life The same year he died after complications from dental surgery. Before his death he had been regarded as a rising German director.

== Selected filmography ==
=== Screenwriter ===
- The Bashful Casanova (1936)
- A Woman of No Importance (1936)
- Mother Song (1937)
- The Chief Witness (1937)
- All Lies (1938)
- Yvette (1938)
- The Leghorn Hat (1939)

=== Director ===
- Mistake of the Heart (1939)
- Journey to Life (1940)

== Bibliography ==
- Giesen, Rolf. Nazi Propaganda Films: A History and Filmography. McFarland & Company 2003.
