= The Disturbed Wedding Night =

1950 film

- Directed by: Helmut Weiss
- Written by: Peter Francke; Maria von der Osten-Sacken
- Based on: Is Your Honeymoon Really Necessary? by Vivian Tidmarsh
- Produced by: Hans Tost
- Starring: Curd Jürgens; Ilse Werner; Susanne von Almassy
- Cinematography: Erich Claunigk
- Edited by: Anneliese Schönnenbeck
- Music by: Adolf Steimel
- Production company: Dornas-Film
- Distributed by: Norddeutscher Filmverleih
- Release date: 28 September 1950
- Running time: 88 minutes
- Country: West Germany
- Language: German

The Disturbed Wedding Night (German: Die gestörte Hochzeitsnacht) is a 1950 West German comedy film directed by Helmut Weiss and starring Curd Jürgens, Ilse Werner, and Susanne von Almassy. It is based on the 1944 British play Is Your Honeymoon Really Necessary? by Vivian Tidmarsh. It was shot at the Sommervilla Studios in Grünwald in Bavaria. The film's sets were designed by the art directors Fritz Lück and Hans Sohnle. A couple's honeymoon is interrupted by the sudden arrival of the husband's first wife.

== Synopsis ==
The English industrialist Lawrence Vinning has recently divorced his first wife, and marries Mary. For their honeymoon they head to his country estate. There he encounters his previous wife Yvonne, who tells him her lawyers think they may still be married as he filed for divorce in America, not Britain. She demands £3,000 to secure a divorce, so he is isn't guilty of bigamy. He does his best to keep Yvonne away from Mary, therefore postponing his wedding night with his second wife.

When Lawrence's lawyer Frank Betterton turns up the next morning, he tries in vain to get Yvonne to give up her claim. When Mary enters and discovers them, Lawrence manages to convince her that Yvonne and Frank are husband and wife. While she soon sees through this, she plays along and over the following day the pretend couple develop genuine feelings for each other. News then arrives that the divorce is valid, freeing the way for the two couples to consummate their relationships.

== Cast ==
- Curd Jürgens as Lawrence Vinning
- Ilse Werner as Mary, seine Frau
- Susanne von Almassy as Yvonne, seine erste Frau
- Paul Dahlke as Hammok, Diener
- Hubert von Meyerinck as Frank Betterton, Lawyer
- Eva Immermann as Ann, Köchin
- Eva Schorling as Betty, Stubenmädchen
- Rolf Pinegger as Tompson, Gärtner
- Rudolf Vogel as Bürovorsteher

== See also ==
- Is Your Honeymoon Really Necessary? (1953)

== Bibliography ==
- Goble, Alan (1999). The Complete Index to Literary Sources in Film. Berlin: Walter de Gruyter. ISBN 978-3-11-095194-3.
- Reichmann, Hans-Peter. Curd Jürgens. Henschel, 2007.
