= Arthur Schwarz =

German art director

- Born: 2 September 1890; Berlin, German Empire
- Died: 4 October 1957 (aged 67); East Berlin, East Germany
- Other name: Artur Schwarz
- Occupation: Art director
- Years active: 1928–1957 (film)

Arthur Schwarz (1890–1957) was a German art director. He designed film sets in the German film industry during the Weimar and Nazi eras. After the Second World War he was employed by DEFA in East Germany working on films such as Rotation.

== Selected filmography ==
- Adam and Eve (1928)
- Herkules Maier (1928)
- Homecoming (1928)
- No Man's Land (1931)
- Typhoon (1933)
- Hard Luck Mary (1934)
- Farewell Waltz (1934)
- Song of Farewell (1934)
- Pygmalion (1935)
- A Night on the Danube (1935)
- Die Entführung (1936)
- The Empress's Favourite (1936)
- The Castle in Flanders (1936)
- The Irresistible Man (1937)
- Sergeant Berry (1938)
- Love Letters from Engadin (1938)
- Water for Canitoga (1939)
- Aus erster Ehe (1940)
- The Waitress Anna (1941)
- His Son (1942)
- Liebeskomödie (1943)
- A Waltz with You (1943)
- Fahrt ins Abenteuer (1943)
- Wild Bird (1943)
- The Master Detective (1944)
- That Was My Life (1944)
- Rotation (1949)
- Die Kreuzlschreiber (1950)
- The Benthin Family (1950)
- The Sonnenbrucks (1951)

== Bibliography ==
- Orbanz, Eve. Wolfgang Staudte. Spiess, 1977.
