= Mistake of the Heart =

1939 film

- Directed by: Bernd Hofmann; Alfred Stöger
- Written by: Alexander Lix; Walter Forster; Bernd Hofmann
- Produced by: Karl Schulz
- Starring: Paul Hartmann; Leny Marenbach; Hans Söhnker
- Cinematography: Georg Bruckbauer
- Edited by: Carl Forcht
- Music by: Clemens Schmalstich
- Production company: Bavaria Film
- Distributed by: Bavaria Film
- Release date: 29 August 1939
- Running time: 91 minutes
- Country: Germany
- Language: German

Mistake of the Heart (German: Irrtum des Herzens) is a 1939 German romantic drama film directed by Bernd Hofmann and Alfred Stöger and starring Paul Hartmann, Leny Marenbach and Hans Söhnker. It was shot at the Bavaria Studios in Munich. The film's sets were designed by the art directors Robert A. Dietrich and Artur Günther. It was produced and distributed by Bavaria Film, premiering at the Gloria-Palast in Berlin.

== Cast ==
- Paul Hartmann as Professor Reimers
- Leny Marenbach as Angelika
- Hans Söhnker as Flugkapitän van Santen
- Käthe Dorsch as Oberin
- Grethe Weiser as Therese
- Karl Ludwig Schreiber as Konrad Reimers
- Walter Janssen as Dr. Erwin Büttner
- Alice Treff as Erika Büttner
- Karl Etlinger as Dr. Leitgerber
- Albert Florath as Steinmeyer
- Josefine Dora as Nikolaus
- Werner Pledath as Dr. Eickstädt
- Wilhelm Bendow as Straaßenbahnschaffner
- Wolf Ackva as Dr. Smolny
- Reinhold Bernt as Dr. Reithofer
- Arthur Fritz Eugens as Helmuth
- Willi Schur as Kantinenwirt
- Ewald Wenck asKutscher

== Bibliography ==
- Giesen, Rolf. The Nosferatu Story: The Seminal Horror Film, Its Predecessors and Its Enduring Legacy. McFarland, 2019.
- Klaus, Ulrich J. Deutsche Tonfilme: Jahrgang 1939. Klaus-Archiv, 1988.
- Rentschler, Eric. The Ministry of Illusion: Nazi Cinema and Its Afterlife. Harvard University Press, 1996.
