= Yvette (1938 film) =

1938 film by Wolfgang Liebeneiner

- Directed by: Wolfgang Liebeneiner
- Written by: Guy de Maupassant (story); Bernd Hofmann
- Produced by: Heinrich Jonen
- Starring: Käthe Dorsch; Ruth Hellberg; Albert Matterstock
- Cinematography: Franz Weihmayr
- Edited by: W. von Bonborst
- Music by: Hanson Milde-Meissner
- Production company: Meteor-Film
- Distributed by: Tobis Film
- Release date: 25 March 1938
- Running time: 98 minutes
- Country: Germany
- Language: German

Yvette is a 1938 German historical drama film directed by Wolfgang Liebeneiner and starring Käthe Dorsch, Ruth Hellberg and Albert Matterstock. It is based on a short story of the same name by the French writer Guy de Maupassant. It is set in Paris in the 1880s.

== Cast ==
- Käthe Dorsch as Oktavia Obardi
- Ruth Hellberg as Yvette Obardi
- Albert Matterstock as Jean Servigny
- Johannes Riemann as Bankier Aristide de Saval
- Hans Adalbert Schlettow as Fürst Kravalow
- Karl Fochler as Chevalier Valreali
- Albert Florath as Pfarrer von Bougival
- Paul Bildt as Apotheker von Bougival
- Gustav Waldau as Marqis von Bougival
- Franz Weber as Kriegsinvalide Martinez
- Leopold von Ledebur as Haushofmeister
- Ellen Bang as Fürstin
- Pamela Wedekind as Schwester Euphoria
- Werner von Wulfing as Herr von Belvigne
- Elsa Andrä Beyer as Hausmädchen Suzanne
- Gerda Maria Terno as Baronin
- Margot Erbst as Marquise
- Lucie Polzin as Nichette
- Peter Busse as Baron
- Curt Ackermann as Marquis von Roqueville
- Kurt Mikulski as Ober in Pariser Café

== Bibliography ==
- Goble, Alan. The Complete Index to Literary Sources in Film. Walter de Gruyter, 1999.
