= Fita Benkhoff =

German actress (1901-1967)

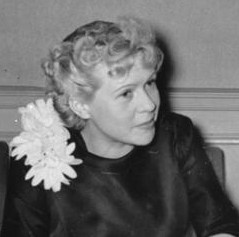
- Fita Benkhoff in 1938
- Born: 1 November 1901; Dortmund, Germany
- Died: 26 October 1967 (aged 65); Munich, West Germany
- Occupation: Actress
- Years active: 1933–1967

Fita Benkhoff (1 November 1901 – 26 October 1967) was a German actress.

== Life ==
Benkhoff was born in 1901. She appeared in more than 100 films between 1933 and 1967. When the actress Louise Dumont separated from her husband in the 1920s, Benkhoff was one of a number of young actresses Dumont was attached to. It has been presumed that Dumont was bisexual.

== Selected filmography ==
- Mother and Child (1934) - Frau Hellinger
- A Girl Whirls By the World (1934) - Fräulein Pape
- Gold (1934) - (uncredited)
- Der Meisterboxer (1934) - Amalie Wipperling, Inhaberin eines kleinen Modegeschäftes
- Charley's Aunt (1934) - Mary Fin
- Trouble with Jolanthe (1934) - Erna Klüfkorn, seine Braut
- What Am I Without You (1934) - Frau Winkler
- Heinz in the Moon (1934) - Madame Pythia
- Schwarzer Jäger Johanna (1934) - Philine Melchior
- Alte Kameraden (1934) - Liselotte Klarerdag
- The Legacy of Pretoria (1934) - Lilly Clausen
- The Two Seals (1934) - Thekla
- Amphitryon (1935) - Andria
- Die Werft zum Grauen Hecht (1935) - Mila Schellhase
- The Valley of Love (1935) - Theres
- Liebeslied (1935) - Angelina
- Hangmen, Women and Soldiers (1935) - Die Kesse
- The Bashful Casanova (1936) - Dody Hartwig, Verkäuferin
- Street Music (1936) - Hilde Neumann - eine junge Witwe
- Boccaccio (1936) - Bianca, seine Frau
- Moral (1936) - Ernina Lapomme
- Dinner Is Served (1936) - Henrietta - seine Frau
- Die un-erhörte Frau (1936) - Lisa Brandt - seine Frau
- When Women Keep Silent (1937) - Lilo - seine Frau
- Capers (1937) - Peggy MacFarland
- Manege (1937) - Miß Nelson
- Petermann ist dagegen (1938) - Hanne Krüger - Leiterin der Betriebskantine
- Stimme des Blutes (1938)
- The Marriage Swindler (1938) - Frau Lindemann
- Schüsse in Kabine 7 (1938) - Daisy Lennox
- Diskretion - Ehrensache (1938) - Lilian
- All Lies (1938) - Elisabeth
- Spaßvögel (1939) - Katharina Eberhorn
- It's a Wonderful World (1939)
- Wibbel the Tailor (1939) - Fin, seine Frau
- The Golden Mask (1939) - Nora
- Opera Ball (1939) - Stubenmädchen Hanni
- Her Private Secretary (1940) - Frau Helene Kiepergass
- Casanova heiratet (1940) - Johanna 'Joe' Brinkmann
- Was wird hier gespielt? (1940)
- The Girl from Barnhelm (1940) - Franziska
- What Does Brigitte Want? (1941) - Beate Forbach
- Mistress Moon (1941) - Frau Elisabeth Gerlack
- in Immer nur Du (1941) - Isolde Brummel
- So ein Früchtchen (1942) - Ria Corsini
- My Friend Josephine (1942) - Bianka Terry
- Johann (1943) - Marie Pietschmann
- I Need You (1944) - Hedi Scholz
- Ich habe von dir geträumt (1944) - Maria Dahlberg
- Der Scheiterhaufen (1945)
- Everything Will Be Better in the Morning (1948) - Peggy Hansen, Schauspielerin
- The Time with You (1948) - Frau Beckel
- Trouble Backstairs (1949) - Irma Schulze
- The Beaver Coat (1949) - Auguste Wolff
- Friday the Thirteenth (1949) - Vilma Reckennagel
- Kein Engel ist so rein (1950) - Philine
- Melody of Fate (1950)
- Taxi-Kitty (1950) - Elvira Rembrandt
- Das gestohlene Jahr (1951) - Anna von Boehlen
- The Midnight Venus (1951) - Madame Lavable
- Hilfe, ich bin unsichtbar (1951) - Yvonne
- Die Frauen des Herrn S. (1951) - Stabila
- Durch dick und dünn (1951) - Else Müller
- In München steht ein Hofbräuhaus (1951) - Hermine Kackelmann
- The Thief of Bagdad (1952) - Suleika
- Pension Schöller (1952) - Josefine Krüger, Schriftstellerin
- Dancing Stars (1952) - Nicolle Ferrar
- When the Heath Dreams at Night (1952) - Hermine Knauer
- We'll Talk About Love Later (1953) - Margot Hollmann
- The Singing Hotel (1953) - Dr. Toni Bruscher
- Fanfare of Marriage (1953) - Daisy van Roy
- Must We Get Divorced? (1953) - Elisabeth Lindpaintner
- The Abduction of the Sabine Women (1956) - Frau Striese
- The Telephone Operator (1954) - Tante Bruni
- Maxie (1954) - Irene, beider Freundin
- On the Reeperbahn at Half Past Midnight (1954) - Luise
- The Captain and His Hero (1954) - Frau Kellermann
- Der Himmel ist nie ausverkauft (1955)
- Wenn der Vater mit dem Sohne (1955) - Frl. Biermann
- A Heart Full of Music (1955) - Ellinor Patton
- Three Girls from the Rhine (1955) - Therese Hübner
- Dany, bitte schreiben Sie (1956) - Madame Georgette
- The First Day of Spring (1956) - Käthe
- Opera Ball (1956) - Hermine, seine Frau
- If We All Were Angels (1956) - Selma
- The Beggar Student (1956) - Gräfin Palmatica
- Zwei Herzen voller Seligkeit (1957) - (uncredited)
- ...und die Liebe lacht dazu (1957) - Luise Papendiek
- The Schimeck Family (1957) - Bernhardine, seine Frau
- Europas neue Musikparade 1958 (1957) - Tante Fita
- Ist Mama nicht fabelhaft? (1958) - Tante Emma
- Majestät auf Abwegen (1958) - Berta Linke
- Immer die Mädchen (1959) - Baronin Beate Siebenstein
- Liebe, Luft und lauter Lügen (1959) - Frau Lüsenhoop
- A Summer You Will Never Forget (1959) - Therese Leuchtenthal
- Ingeborg (1960) - Tante Ottilie
- The Time Has Come (1960, TV Series) - Barbara Barstow
- Pichler's Books Are Not in Order (1961) - Ludmilla
- Love Has to Be Learned (1963) - Ilse Lehmbruck
