= Boccaccio (1936 film) =

1936 film

- Directed by: Herbert Maisch
- Written by: Emil Burri; Walter Forster
- Produced by: Max Pfeiffer
- Starring: Albrecht Schoenhals; Gina Falckenberg; Willy Fritsch; Heli Finkenzeller
- Cinematography: Konstantin Irmen-Tschet
- Edited by: Carl Otto Bartning
- Music by: Franz Doelle
- Production company: UFA
- Distributed by: UFA
- Release date: 31 July 1936
- Running time: 88 minutes
- Country: Germany
- Language: German

Boccaccio is a 1936 German historical musical film directed by Herbert Maisch and starring Albrecht Schoenhals, Gina Falckenberg, and Willy Fritsch. It was shot at the Babelsberg Studios in Berlin. The film's sets were designed by the art director Otto Hunte.

== Plot ==
Boccaccio is an operetta that relates to how Nazis conceived the Italian Renaissance. Ferrara residents are carried up in a tide of emotion and physical passion. Before long, the town is in chaos.

== Background ==
The film was produced by Universum-Film AG Berlin under the production management of Max Pfeiffer between mid-February and mid-April 1936 in the Ufa studios in Neubabelsberg and premiered on August 11, 1936, in the UFA-Palast (Berlin).

The film music was written by Franz Doelle, the lyrics by Charles Amberg. Individual songs such as "Bella Fiametta", "Alles, alles tu' ich aus Liebe" and "Radiant Sun" were published by Ufaton Verlag, interpreted by Charles Amberg.

== Cast ==
- Albrecht Schoenhals as Cesare d'Este
- Gina Falckenberg as Francesca
- Willy Fritsch as Petruccicio
- Heli Finkenzeller as Fiametta
- Paul Kemp as Calandrino
- Fita Benkhoff as Bianca
- Albert Florath as Bartolomeo
- Tina Eilers as Pia
- Ernst Waldow as Ricco
- Hans Hermann Schaufuss as First Judge
- Egon Vogel as Student

== Bibliography ==
- O'Brien, Mary-Elizabeth (2004). Nazi Cinema as Enchantment: The Politics of Entertainment in the Third Reich. Rochester, NY: Camden House. ISBN 978-1-57113-334-2.
