= Is Your Honeymoon Really Necessary? (play) =

1944 play

- Written by: Vivian Tidmarsh
- Original language: English
- Genre: Comedy

Premiere
- Date premiered: 1944
- Place premiered: Duke of York's Theatre, London

Is Your Honeymoon Really Necessary? is a 1944 comedy play by the British writer Vivian Tidmarsh. The title is a reference to the wartime slogan Is Your Journey Really Necessary?.

It ran for 981 performances in its original West End run at the Duke of York's Theatre, lasting from 1 August 1944 to 14 December 1946. The cast included Ralph Lynn, who also directed, and Enid Stamp Taylor.

== Film adaptations ==
A 1947 Swedish film Wedding Night was based on the work. In 1950 the play inspired a German film The Disturbed Wedding Night starring Curd Jürgens, Ilse Werner and Susanne von Almassy. In 1953 a British adaptation Is Your Honeymoon Really Necessary? was made, starring Bonar Colleano, Diana Dors and David Tomlinson.

== Bibliography ==
- Goble, Alan. The Complete Index to Literary Sources in Film. Walter de Gruyter, 1999.
- Wearing, J.P. The London Stage 1940-1949: A Calendar of Productions, Performers, and Personnel. Rowman & Littlefield, 2014.
