= The Legacy of Pretoria =

1934 film directed by Johannes Meyer

- Directed by: Johannes Meyer
- Written by: Walter Wassermann; Ludwig von Wohl (novel)
- Produced by: Gustl Lautenbacher; Otto Ernst Lubitz
- Starring: Paul Hartmann; Charlotte Susa; Paul Henckels
- Cinematography: Karl Hasselmann
- Edited by: Gottlieb Madl
- Music by: Hans Carste
- Production companies: Bavaria Film; Atalanta-Film
- Distributed by: Bavaria Film
- Release date: 19 October 1934
- Running time: 95 minutes
- Country: Germany
- Language: German

The Legacy of Pretoria (German: Das Erbe von Pretoria) is a 1934 German drama film directed by Johannes Meyer and starring Paul Hartmann, Charlotte Susa and Paul Henckels. It was based on the novel Die Reise nach Pretoria by Ludwig von Wohl.

It was shot at the Bavaria Studios in Munich. The film's sets were designed by the art director Max Seefelder.

== Synopsis ==
A German man inherits a business in South Africa, but struggles to run it.

== Cast ==
- Paul Hartmann as Bernhard Fredersen
- Charlotte Susa as Agnes Fredersen
- Paul Henckels as Petermann
- Philipp Manning as Admiral Wiethaus
- Max Weydner as William Spencer
- Gustaf Gründgens as Eugen Schliebach
- Lilo Müller as Ines
- Kurt Vespermann as Hans Joachim Förster
- Walter Lantzsch as Captain Husemann
- Richard Ryen as Georg Miller
- Philipp Veit as Gehelmrat Klinger
- Fita Benkhoff as Lilly Clausen
- Josef Eichheim as Diener Karl

== Bibliography ==
- Bock, Hans-Michael; Bergfelder, Tim, eds. (2009). The Concise Cinegraph: Encyclopaedia of German Cinema. New York: Berghahn Books. ISBN 978-1-57181-655-9.
