= Trouble Backstairs (1935 film) =

1935 German film directed by Veit Harlan

- Directed by: Veit Harlan
- Written by: Maximilian Böttcher (play); Carl Junghans; Reinhold Meißner
- Produced by: Walter von Ercert; Kurt Peters
- Starring: Henny Porten; Else Elster; Rotraut Richter; Gaston Briese
- Cinematography: Bruno Mondi
- Edited by: Ludolf Grisebach
- Music by: Fritz Domina; Will Meisel
- Production company: A.B.C.-Film
- Distributed by: NDLS
- Release date: 20 December 1935
- Running time: 83 minutes
- Country: Germany
- Language: German

Trouble Backstairs (German: Krach im Hinterhaus) is a 1935 German romantic comedy film directed by Veit Harlan and starring Henny Porten, Else Elster and Rotraut Richter. It marked the directoral debut of Harlan, who had previously worked as an actor, and quickly developed as a leading director of Nazi Germany. It was based on a play by Maximilian Böttcher, and was remade in 1949.

It was shot at the Terra Studios in Berlin. The film's sets were designed by the art director Bruno Lutz and Hermann Warm

== Cast ==
- Henny Porten as Frau Witwe Bock
- Else Elster as Ilse Bock, ihre Tochter
- Rotraut Richter as Edeltraut Panse
- Gaston Briese as Postoberschaffner Hermann Briese
- Ilse Fürstenberg as Frau Irma Schulze
- Hilde Sessak as Paula Schulze, Tochter
- Reinhold Bernt as August Krüger, Hausverwalter
- Gerda Kuffner as Malchen Krüger, seine Frau
- Gerhard Bienert as Bäckermeister Gustav Kluge
- Paul Mederow as Justizrat Dr. Horn
- Berthold Ebbecke as Assessor Dr. Erich Horn, sein Sohn
- Eduard von Winterstein as Amtsgerichtsrat Müller
- Helmut Weiss as Prosecutor
- Carl Jönsson as Vater Panse
- Erich Kestin as Mann im Zuschauerraum
- Meta Jäger as Frau Döring
- Hanni Weisse as 1. Frau im Zuschauerraum
- Albrecht Bethge as Gerichtsdiener
- Otto Albrecht as Tenor
- Wera Schultz as 1. Verkäuferin
- Hilde Maris as 2. Verkäuferin
- Jutta Sabo as 2. Frau im Zuschauerraum
- Erika von Schaper as 3. Verkäuferin

== Production ==
The film was shot over the course of ten days on a budget of 250,000 RM in 1935 (equivalent to €1153736 in 2021).

== Works cited ==
- Hull, David (1969). Film in the Third Reich: Art and Propaganda in Nazi Germany. Simon & Schuster. SBN 671214861.

== Bibliography ==
- Bock, Hans-Michael & Bergfelder, Tim. The Concise CineGraph. Encyclopedia of German Cinema. Berghahn Books, 2009.
- Klaus, Ulrich J. Deutsche Tonfilme: Jahrgang 1935. Klaus-Archiv, 1988.
- Wistrich, Robert S. Who's Who in Nazi Germany. Routledge, 2013.
