= Dangerous Crossing (1937 film) =

1937 film directed by Robert A. Stemmle

- Directed by: Robert A. Stemmle
- Written by: Rolf E. Vanloo (novel); Robert A. Stemmle
- Produced by: Hans Herbert Ulrich; Robert Wüllner
- Starring: Gustav Fröhlich; Heli Finkenzeller; Paul Hoffmann
- Cinematography: Karl Puth
- Edited by: Roger von Norman
- Music by: Hans-Otto Borgmann
- Production company: UFA
- Distributed by: UFA
- Release date: 27 January 1937
- Running time: 80 minutes
- Country: Germany
- Language: German

Dangerous Crossing or Rail Triangle (German: Gleisdreieck) is a 1937 German crime film directed by Robert A. Stemmle and starring Gustav Fröhlich, Heli Finkenzeller, and Paul Hoffmann. It is set amongst railway workers and takes its name from Gleisdreieck on the Berlin U-Bahn. It was partly shot at the Babelsberg Studios in Potsdam. The film's sets were designed by the art directors Carl Böhm and Erich Czerwonski. It was shot on location around Berlin. It premiered at the city's Ufa-Palast am Zoo.

== Synopsis ==
A young railway worker rescues a woman from committing suicide and swiftly falls in love with her. However, before long he is drawn into the criminal schemes of her brother, recently released from prison.

== Cast ==
- Gustav Fröhlich as Hans Scheffler, U-Bahn-Beamter
- Heli Finkenzeller as Gerda Volkmann
- Paul Hoffmann as Max, ihr Bruder
- Otto Wernicke as Scheffler, Aufsichtsbeamter
- Toni von Bukovics as Frau Scheffler
- Fritz Genschow as Fritz Buchholz, U-Bahn-Beamter
- Hilde Sessak as Lotte Krüger, Zigarettenverkäuferin
- Albert Hörrmann as Ganove Hobby
- Eduard Wenck as Gehrke
- Oscar Sabo as Taxichauffeur
- Werner Pledath as Kriminalkommissar König
- Ludwig Andersen as Geldvermittler
- Charly Berger as 2. Reinigungskraft in der U-Bahn
- Helga Böttger as Gretchen
- Ellinor Büller as Chefin des Modesalons
- Harry Elnain as Freund von Max
- Rudolf Essek as Geschäftsführer des Modesalons
- Werner Finck
- Adolf Fischer as 1. Reinigungskraft in der U-Bahn
- Walter Gross as Besitzer des Möbelgeschäftes
- Erich Gühne as U-Bahn-Schaffner
- Knut Hartwig as 2. Kriminalkommissar
- Hans Henninger as U-Bahner
- Alfred Karen as Kinokartenkäufer
- Erich Kasch as 1. Kriminalbeamter
- Kurt Keller-Nebri as Kriminalbeamter im U-Bahn-Schacht
- Fritz Klaudius as 1. U-Bahn-Schaffner in der Generalversammlung
- Arthur Kühn as 2. U-Bahn-Schaffner in der Generalversammlung
- Walter Lieck as Beamter im Meldeamt
- Edith Meinhard as Fahrkartenverkäuferin
- Rio Nobile as 2. Kriminalbeamter
- Arthur Reinhardt as Kellner im Restaurant
- Marie Sera as Zimmervermieterin
- Lotte Spira
- Wolfgang Staudte as 3.U-Bahn-Schaffner bei der Generalversammlung
- Alfred Stein as Gast im Restaurant
- Olly van Dyck as Gerdas Freundin im Modesalon
- Betty Waid as Fahrgast in der U-Bahn
- Alfred Walter as 3. Kriminalbeamter

== Bibliography ==
- Bock, Hans-Michael; Bergfelder, Tim, eds. (2009). The Concise Cinegraph: Encyclopaedia of German Cinema. New York: Berghahn Books. ISBN 978-1-57181-655-9.
- Heins, Laura (2013). Nazi Film Melodrama. Urbana: University of Illinois Press. ISBN 978-0-252-09502-3.
