= Ruth Hellberg =

German actress (1906–2001)

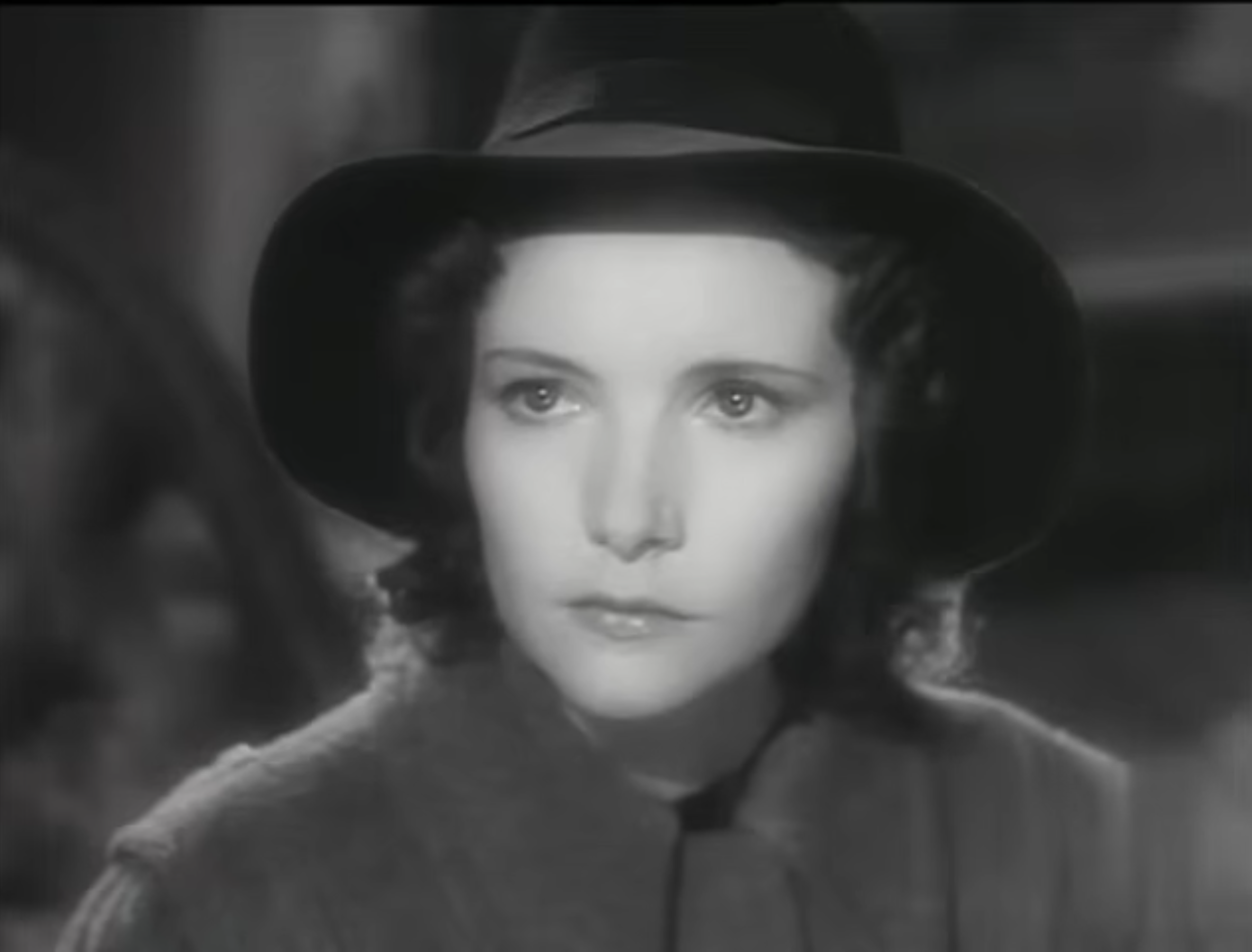
- Hellberg in Broken Love (1942)
- Born: 2 November 1906; Berlin, Germany
- Died: 26 April 2001 (aged 94); Feldafing, Germany
- Occupation: Actress
- Years active: 1933–1991

Ruth Hellberg (2 November 1906 – 26 April 2001) was a German actress. She appeared in more than 25 films between 1933 and 1991.

== Selected filmography ==
- What Men Know (1933)
- Yvette (1938)
- Heimat (1938)
- Secret Mission (1938)
- Drei Unteroffiziere (1939)
- Bismarck (1940)
- Twilight (1940)
- Heimkehr (1941)
- Broken Love (1942)
- A Free Woman (1972)
