= Who's Kissing Madeleine? =

1939 film

- Directed by: Victor Janson
- Written by: Wolfgang Böttcher; Edgar Kahn
- Starring: Magda Schneider; Albert Matterstock; Herti Kirchner
- Cinematography: Walter Riml
- Edited by: Walter Fredersdorf
- Music by: Werner Bochmann
- Production company: Terra Film
- Distributed by: Terra Film
- Release date: 24 August 1939
- Running time: 81 minutes
- Country: Germany
- Language: German

Who's Kissing Madeleine? (German: Wer küßt Madeleine?) is a 1939 German comedy film directed by Victor Janson and starring Magda Schneider, Albert Matterstock and Herti Kirchner. The film's sets were designed by the art director Willy Schiller. Location shooting took place at Rangsdorf near Berlin.

== Synopsis ==
A French pilot's head is filled with thoughts of his wife flirting with other men in his absence, his mind focusing on three particular candidates. In turn, she is suspicious that he may be having an affair.

== Cast ==
- Magda Schneider as Madeleine Pasqual
- Albert Matterstock as Pierre Pasqual
- Herti Kirchner as Francoise de Villiers
- Hermann Speelmans as Maurice Duroi
- Ernst Waldow as Gaston de Villiers
- Albert Florath as Polizeipräfekt
- Herbert Hübner as Courbierre
- Wolf Kersten as Victor
- Julia Serda as Ellinor Vanderstift
- Paul Bildt as Polizeikommissar
- Paul Dahlke as Kommissar Watson
- Paul Westermeier as Polizist Batier
- Ilse Fürstenberg as Dorothy Simplon
- Rudolf Platte as Sänger im Café
- Heinrich Marlow as Chef von Rousseau & Rousseau
- F.W. Schröder-Schrom as Direktor des Flugdienstes
- Ernst G. Schiffner as Polizist
- Charlotte Schellhorn as Toinette
- Ilse Petri as Suzette
- Ethel Reschke as Hausmädchen Paulette
- Armin Schweizer as Wachhabender

== Bibliography ==
- James Robert Parish. Film Actors Guide. Scarecrow Press, 1977.
