= I Need You (film) =

1944 film

- Directed by: Hans Schweikart
- Written by: Peter Francke; Hans Schweikart
- Produced by: Gerhard Staab
- Starring: Marianne Hoppe; Willy Birgel; Paul Dahlke; Fita Benkhoff
- Cinematography: Franz Koch
- Edited by: Ludolf Grisebach
- Music by: Oskar Wagner
- Production company: Bavaria Film
- Distributed by: Deutsche Filmvertriebs
- Release date: 12 May 1944
- Running time: 82 minutes
- Country: Germany
- Language: German

I Need You (German: Ich brauche dich) is a 1944 German comedy film directed by Hans Schweikart and starring Marianne Hoppe, Willy Birgel and Paul Dahlke. It was shot at the Bavaria Studios in Munich and on location at the city's Central Station. The film's sets were designed by the art director Hans Sohnle.

== Synopsis ==
A conductor and his actress wife enjoy a stormy relationship due to their clashing working commitments.

== Cast ==
- Marianne Hoppe as Julia Bach
- Willy Birgel as Prof. Paulus Allmann
- Paul Dahlke as Direktor Heinrich Scholz
- Fita Benkhoff as Hedi Scholz
- Ernst Fritz Fürbringer as Dr. Max Hoffmann
- Erna Sellmer as Julias Hausmädchen Emilie
- Joseph Offenbach as Dr. Wilberg

== Bibliography ==
- Hake, Sabine. Popular Cinema of the Third Reich. University of Texas Press, 2001.
