= My Friend Josephine =

1942 film

- Directed by: Hans H. Zerlett
- Written by: Curt J. Braun; Johanna Sibelius
- Produced by: Herbert Engelsing
- Starring: Hilde Krahl; Paul Hubschmid; Fita Benkhoff
- Cinematography: Erich Nitzschmann; Bruno Stephan
- Edited by: Ilse Voigt
- Music by: Paul Hühn; Leo Leux; Friedrich Schröder
- Production company: Tobis Film
- Distributed by: Deutsche Filmvertriebs
- Release date: 4 November 1942
- Running time: 74 minutes
- Country: Germany
- Language: German

My Friend Josephine (German: Meine Freundin Josefine) is a 1942 German comedy film directed by Hans H. Zerlett and starring Hilde Krahl, Paul Hubschmid and Fita Benkhoff. Produced by the prominent studio Tobis Film, it was shot at the Johannisthal Studios in Berlin. The film's sets were designed by the art director Wilhelm Depenau.

== Synopsis ==
Josefine lives in her wealthy uncle's house, but is sick of being treated by him like a servant. Her friend Bianka Terry manages to secure her a job working at the fashion house run by the proud Herr Milander. After she clashes with him, she leaves and sets up her own fashion house with the financial assistance of Bianka. Unknown to both her and Milander, the money is actually coming from his account. She wins a design award that Milander had previously taken three times running. By now he realises he is love with her.

== Cast ==
- Hilde Krahl as Josefine
- Paul Hubschmid as Herr Milander
- Fita Benkhoff as Bianka Terry
- Hans Leibelt as Herr Bauer
- Olga Limburg as Frau Bauer
- Gerda Maria Terno as Marianne
- Roma Bahn as Fräulein Köhring
- Wilfried Seyferth as Diener Oscar
- Else Reval as Köchin Luise
- Käte Kühl as Frau Kampendonk
- Erwin Biegel as Herr Kampendonk
- Just Scheu as Gläubiger
- Ernst Stimmel as Geschäftsfreund
- Wilhelm Bendow as Mixer
- Eduard Wenck as Gerichtsvollzieher
- Gunnar Möller as Bote
- Edith Rix as Biankas Zofe
- Ruth Buchardt as Ladenmädchen bei Milander
- Maria von Höslin as Dienstmädchen bei der Familie Bauer

== Bibliography ==
- Bock, Hans-Michael & Bergfelder, Tim. The Concise CineGraph. Encyclopedia of German Cinema. Berghahn Books, 2009.
- Klaus, Ulrich J. Deutsche Tonfilme: Jahrgang 1942. Klaus-Archiv, 1988.
