= Heimat (1938 film) =

1938 film directed by Carl Froelich

- Directed by: Carl Froelich
- Written by: Hermann Sudermann (play); Harald Braun; Hans Brennert; Otto Ernst Hesse
- Produced by: Carl Froelich; Friedrich Pflughaupt
- Starring: Zarah Leander; Heinrich George; Ruth Hellberg
- Cinematography: Franz Weihmayr
- Edited by: Gustav Lohse
- Music by: Theo Mackeben
- Production companies: Tonfilmstudio Carl Froelich; UFA
- Distributed by: UFA
- Release date: June 25, 1938 (Germany)
- Running time: 98 minutes
- Country: Nazi Germany
- Language: German

Heimat is a 1938 German historical drama film directed by Carl Froelich and starring Zarah Leander, Heinrich George and Ruth Hellberg. The film's melodramatic storyline portrays the return of a leading singer to her hometown, where her father wishes her to settle down and marry. It is based on the 1893 play Heimat by Hermann Sudermann.

It was shot at the Tempelhof Studios in Berlin. The film's sets were designed by the art directors Franz Schroedter and Walter Haag.

Froelich won the award for best director at the 1938 Venice Film Festival for this film.

== Synopsis ==
The opera singer Maddalena had been cast out by her family after they learned she was to bear the child of a banker, von Keller, who had seduced and abandoned her. Her return to her native city has her father warn her to remain away, because she is a threat to her family, and her sister Marie's wedding. However, von Keller threatens the reputation of her family with an underhanded banking scheme. He commits suicide, and Maddalena is reconciled with her family.

== Cast ==
- Zarah Leander as Maddalena Dall'Orto
- Heinrich George as Leopold Dall'Orto Schwartze
- Ruth Hellberg as Marie
- Lina Carstens as Fränze von Klebs
- Paul Hörbiger as Franz Heffterdingk
- Georg Alexander as Ludwig Prinz von Imlingen
- Leo Slezak as Rohrmoser
- Hans Nielsen as Max von Wendlowsky
- Franz Schafheitlin as Bankdirektor von Keller
- Ernst Schiffner

== Bibliography ==
- Reimer, Robert C. (2000). Cultural History Through a National Socialist Lens: Essays on the Cinema of the Third Reich. Camden House. ISBN 978-1-57113-164-5.
