= Erich Dunskus =

German actor

- Born: 27 July 1890; Pillkallen, East Prussia, German Empire
- Died: 25 November 1967 (aged 77); Hagen, West Germany
- Occupation: Actor
- Years active: 1927-1966

Erich Adolf Dunskus (27 July 1890 – 25 November 1967) was a German film actor. He appeared in 170 films between 1927 and 1966. He was born in Pillkallen, East Prussia and died in Hagen, West Germany.

== Selected filmography ==
- The King of Paris (1930)
- Bobby Gets Going (1931)
- Girls to Marry (1932)
- Secret Agent (1932)
- Overnight Sensation (1932)
- And Who Is Kissing Me? (1933)
- So Ended a Great Love (1934)
- Paganini (1934)
- The Girl from the Marsh Croft (1935)
- The Saint and Her Fool (1935)
- Pygmalion (1935)
- City of Anatol (1936)
- Savoy Hotel 217 (1936)
- The Haunted Castle (1936)
- Family Parade (1936)
- Love's Awakening (1936)
- Der Kaiser von Kalifornien (1936)
- Tomfoolery (1936)
- An Enemy of the People (1937)
- Woman's Love—Woman's Suffering (1937)
- Capers (1937)
- Don't Promise Me Anything (1937)
- The Man Who Was Sherlock Holmes (1937)
- Seven Slaps (1937)
- Serenade (1937)
- Men Without a Fatherland (1937)
- The Chief Witness (1937)
- Love Can Lie (1937)
- Tango Notturno (1937)
- The Divine Jetta (1937)
- The Broken Jug (1937)
- Monika (1938)
- Dance on the Volcano (1938)
- Secret Code LB 17 (1938)
- The Impossible Mister Pitt (1938)
- Shadows Over St. Pauli (1938)
- The Blue Fox (1938)
- Uproar in Damascus (1939)
- Detours to Happiness (1939)
- D III 88 (1939)
- Midsummer Night's Fire (1939)
- The False Step (1939)
- In the Name of the People (1939)
- Her First Experience (1939)
- Robert Koch (1939)
- Twilight (1940)
- Between Hamburg and Haiti (1940)
- Counterfeiters (1940)
- Jud Süß (1940)
- Friedemann Bach (1941)
- What Does Brigitte Want? (1941)
- The Swedish Nightingale (1941)
- The Great Love (1942)
- Love Me (1942)
- The Big Game (1942)
- Beloved World (1942)
- The Golden Spider (1943)
- An Old Heart Becomes Young Again (1943)
- Paracelsus (1943)
- Summer Nights (1944)
- A Wife for Three Days (1944)
- Under the Bridges (1946)
- No Place for Love (1947)
- The Court Concert (1948)
- Morituri (1948)
- Don't Dream, Annette (1949)
- Quartet of Five (1949)
- The Cuckoos (1949)
- Girls Behind Bars (1949)
- The Great Mandarin (1949)
- Bürgermeister Anna (1950)
- Melody of Fate (1950)
- The Woman from Last Night (1950)
- The Sinful Border (1951)
- When the Heath Dreams at Night (1952)
- Red Roses, Red Lips, Red Wine (1953)
- Captain Wronski (1954)
- Die Ratten (1955)
- Before God and Man (1955)
- A Heart Returns Home (1956)
- My Father, the Actor (1956)
- The Heart of St. Pauli (1957)
- It Happened Only Once (1958)
- A Thousand Stars Aglitter (1959)
- Marili (1959)
- Barbara (1961)
