= Secret Mission (1938 film) =

1938 film

- Directed by: Jürgen von Alten
- Written by: Jacob Geis; Jürgen von Alten
- Produced by: Ernst Garden
- Starring: Gustav Fröhlich; Camilla Horn; Ruth Hellberg; Paul Wegener
- Cinematography: Oskar Schnirch
- Edited by: Wolfgang Becker
- Music by: Peter Kreuder; Anton Profes
- Production company: Cine-Allianz
- Distributed by: Panorama Film
- Release date: 16 December 1938
- Running time: 91 minutes
- Country: Germany
- Language: German

Secret Mission (German: In geheimer Mission) is a 1938 German crime thriller film directed by Jürgen von Alten and starring Gustav Fröhlich, Camilla Horn, Ruth Hellberg and Paul Wegener. It was shot at the Johannisthal Studios in Berlin and on location around Genoa. The film's sets were designed by the art directors Heinrich Beisenherz and Alfred Bütow.

== Synopsis ==
Jan Jenssen, a sailor, is hired by the mysterious Branting to deliver a briefcase on his behalf to Genoa. There he encounters the alluring femme fatale Marion and soon finds himself involved a complex plot over the secret locations of beryllium deposits in South America, which are stolen. As the ruthless industrialist Morrow is attempting to create a worldwide monopoly on beryllium, he seems an obvious source of interest and Jan signs as a member of the crew of his yacht.

== Cast ==
- Gustav Fröhlich as Jan Jenssen, Steuermann
- Camilla Horn as Marion
- Ruth Hellberg as Ruth Martens
- Paul Wegener as Morrow
- Franz Arzdorf as Chef
- Walter Bechmann as Professor
- Paul Bildt as Branting
- Erich Fiedler as Hartwig
- Charles Francois as 3. Herr
- Fred Goebel as 1. Herr
- Karl Jüstel as 2. Herr
- Maria Loja as Wirtin
- Anton Pointner as Zaroff
- Otto Stoeckel as Präsident
- Theodor Vogeler as General Concha
- Eugen von Bongardt as Razzaro
- Paul Westermeier as Reschke

== Bibliography ==
- Giesen, Rolf. The Nosferatu Story: The Seminal Horror Film, Its Predecessors and Its Enduring Legacy. McFarland, 2025.
- Klaus, Ulrich J. Deutsche Tonfilme: Jahrgang 1938. Klaus-Archiv, 1988.
