= Father Needs a Wife =

1952 film

- Theatrical film poster
- German: Vater braucht eine Frau
- Directed by: Harald Braun
- Written by: Christian Bock; Herbert Reinecker; Herbert Witt
- Produced by: Harald Braun
- Starring: Dieter Borsche; Ruth Leuwerik; Bruni Löbel
- Cinematography: Richard Angst
- Edited by: Claus von Boro
- Music by: Franz Grothe
- Production company: Neue Deutsche Filmgesellschaft
- Distributed by: Schorcht Filmverleih
- Release date: 17 October 1952
- Running time: 98 minutes
- Country: West Germany
- Language: German

Father Needs a Wife (German: Vater braucht eine Frau) is a 1952 West German comedy film directed by Harald Braun and starring Dieter Borsche, Ruth Leuwerik and Bruni Löbel. It was made at the Bavaria Studios in Munich and on location around Lautersee and Mittenwald. The film's sets were designed by the art directors Hans Sohnle and Fritz Lück.

== Plot ==
A widowed father advertises for a new maid, but his children secretly seek a woman to be his new wife.

== Cast ==
- Dieter Borsche as Dr. Hans Neumeister
- Ruth Leuwerik as Susanne Meissner
- Bruni Löbel as Lotti Hellwig
- Günther Lüders as Photograph Kurt Fischer
- Therese Giehse as Frau Nickel
- Paul Bildt as Herr in der Anzeigenannahme
- Wera Frydtberg as Gisela
- Angelika Meissner as Ulla Neumeister - daughter
- Urs Hess as Philipp Neumeister - Age 11
- Migg Hess as Martin Neumeister - Age 10
- Oliver Grimm as Tom Neumeister - Age 4
