= Heli Finkenzeller =

German actress (1914–1991)

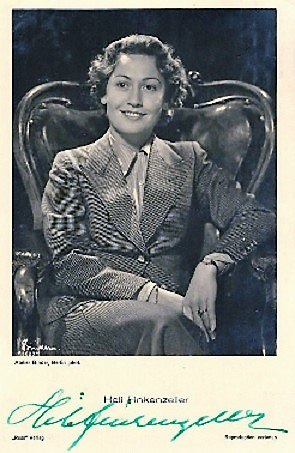
- Born: 17 November 1914; Munich, Kingdom of Bavaria, German Empire
- Died: 14 January 1991 (aged 76); Munich, Germany
- Occupation: Actress
- Years active: 1935–1991
- Spouse: Will Dohm
- Children: Gaby Dohm

Heli Finkenzeller (17 November 1914 – 14 January 1991) was a German actress. She appeared in more than 80 films and television shows between 1935 and 1991.

== Selected filmography ==
- Marriage Strike (1935) - Pepi, seine Frau
- The Royal Waltz (1935) - Theres Tomasoni, seine Tochter
- The Higher Command (1935) - Käte Traß
- Women's Regiment (1936) - Rosl
- Boccaccio (1936) - Fiametta, seine Frau
- Dangerous Crossing (1937) - Gerda Volkmann
- Wie der Hase läuft (1937) - Marianne, seine Tochter
- My Son the Minister (1937) - Nannette - seine Frau
- Spiel auf der Tenne (1937) - Lena Feldhofer
- The Model Husband (1937) - Doddy Wheeler
- Der Schimmelkrieg in der Holledau (1937) - Anna, beider Tochter
- Konzert in Tirol (1938) - Leni Lahntaler
- Diskretion - Ehrensache (1938) - Mary Hopkins
- Scheidungsreise (1938) - Marianne Delius
- Eine kleine Nachtmusik (1939) - Komtess Eugenie
- Opera Ball (1939) - Helene Hollinger
- Hochzeitsnacht (1941) - Vroni
- Der siebente Junge (1941) - Christine, seine Schwaegerin
- Ehe man Ehemann wird (1941) - Elli
- Alarmstufe V (1941) - Hilde Meindl
- Front Theatre (1942) - Lena Meinhardt-Andres
- Kohlhiesel's Daughters (1943) - Veronika Kohlhöfer
- The Bath in the Barn (1943) - Antje, seine Frau
- I'll Carry You in My Arms (1943) - Karin Hartung
- Alles aus Liebe (1943) - Inge
- Wo ist Herr Belling? (1945, unfinished film) - Pianistin Bettina Heinemann
- Hallo - Sie haben Ihre Frau vergessen (1949) - Barbara
- Münchnerinnen (1949) - Resi Schegerer
- Twelve Hearts for Charly (1949) - Gabriele
- The Woman from Last Night (1950) - Heidi
- It Began at Midnight (1951) - die Einbrecherin
- Stips (1951) - Katja Romberg
- Mikosch Comes In (1952) - Claire von Ferency
- At the Well in Front of the Gate (1952) - Mary Murphy
- Such a Charade (1953) - Dorette Schilling
- Mailman Mueller (1953) - Charlotte Müller
- Emil and the Detectives (1954) - Seine Mutter Anna Tischbein
- Jackboot Mutiny (1955) - Sekretärin (uncredited)
- Lost Child 312 (1955) - Jo
- Ciske de Rat (1955)
- Die wilde Auguste (1956) - Baronin Asta von Hastig
- The First Day of Spring (1956) - Edith
- A Thousand Melodies (1956) - Tante Dele
- Jenny (1959)
- A Summer You Will Never Forget (1959) - Mrs. Dr.Manning
- Wegen Verführung Minderjähriger (1960) - Hanna Rugge
- Und sowas nennt sich Leben (1961) - Maria Berger
- Am Sonntag will mein Süsser mit mir segeln gehn (1961) - Alice Ackermann, die Neureiche
- Heute gehn wir bummeln (1961) - Mrs. Brown
- The Merry Wives of Tyrol (1964) - Veronika Lechner
- Meine Schwiegersöhne und ich (1969–1970, TV Series) - Steffi Rosen
- Satan's Brew (1976)
- Lorentz & Söhne (1988, TV Series) - Amelie Lorentz
