= The Bashful Casanova =

1936 film

- Directed by: Karel Lamac
- Written by: Bernd Hofmann; Karel Lamac
- Based on: Aber Innozenz by Karl Hans Strobl
- Produced by: Karl Julius Fritzsche
- Starring: Paul Kemp; Fita Benkhoff; Charlott Daudert
- Cinematography: Willy Winterstein
- Edited by: Helene Bursek
- Music by: Leo Leux
- Production company: Tobis Film
- Distributed by: Tobis Film
- Release date: 13 February 1936
- Running time: 81 minutes
- Country: Germany
- Language: German

The Bashful Casanova (German: Der schüchterne Casanova) is a 1936 German comedy film directed by Karel Lamac and starring Paul Kemp, Fita Benkhoff and Charlott Daudert. It is based on the novel Aber Innozenz! by Karl Hans Strobl. It was shot at the Johannisthal Studios in Berlin. The film's sets were designed by the art directors Wilhelm Depenau and Erich Zander.

== Cast ==
- Paul Kemp as Innocenz Freisleben
- Fita Benkhoff as Dody Hartwig, Verkäuferin
- Charlott Daudert as Ada Zink
- Wilhelm Bendow as Onkel Burger
- Adele Sandrock as Frau Admiralin
- Franz Felix as Salcher, Tenor
- Ilka Thimm as Daisy, seine Frau
- O.E. Hasse as Schnellhase, Reklamechef
- Gertrud Wolle as Frau Bacher, Musiklehrerin
- Tina Zucchi as Lola Morgana, Zauberkünstlerin
- Ernest Janssen as Winterberger, ihr Assistent
- Edith Meinhard as Camilla Milch - ihre Assistentin

== Bibliography ==
- Bock, Hans-Michael. Die Tobis 1928-1945: eine kommentierte Filmografie. Edition Text + Kritik, 2003.
- Rentschler, Eric. The Ministry of Illusion: Nazi Cinema and Its Afterlife. Harvard University Press, 1996.
- Waldman, Harry. Nazi Films in America, 1933-1942. McFarland, 2008.
