= Herkules Maier =

1928 film

- Directed by: Alexander Esway
- Written by: Alfred Schirokauer; Reinhold Schünzel
- Produced by: Reinhold Schünzel
- Starring: Reinhold Schünzel; Claire Rommer[Ida Perry
- Cinematography: Willy Goldberger
- Music by: Artur Guttmann
- Production company: Reinhold Schünzel Film
- Distributed by: Parufamet
- Release date: 10 February 1928
- Running time: 116 minutes
- Country: Germany
- Languages: Silent; German intertitles

Herkules Maier is a 1928 German silent comedy film directed by Alexander Esway and starring Reinhold Schünzel, Claire Rommer and Ida Perry. It was shot at the Babelsberg Studios in Potsdam. The film's sets were designed by the art directors Arthur Schwarz and Julius von Borsody. It premiered at the Ufa-Palast am Zoo in Berlin.

== Synopsis ==
A travelling salesman and his wife are expecting their first baby. He tries various schemes to raise money to support them both.

== Cast ==
- Reinhold Schünzel as Stadtreisender Herkules Maier
- Claire Rommer as Maria, seine Frau
- Ida Perry as Schwiegermutter
- Sophie Pagay
- Ellen Plessow
- Ernst Behmer
- Julius E. Herrmann
- Albert Paulig
- Ferry Sikla
- Eugen Burg
- Max Ehrlich
- Lydia Potechina
- Gertl Grossmann
- Carl Geppert
- Rosa Valetti as Wirtin
- Ludwig Stössel
- Carla Bartheel
- Hugo Werner-Kahle
- Sig Arno
- Maria Kamradek
- Paul Westermeier
- Lydia Newerowskaja
- Arthur Schwarz

== Bibliography ==
- Hans-Michael Bock and Tim Bergfelder. The Concise Cinegraph: An Encyclopedia of German Cinema. Berghahn Books. ISBN 978-0-85745-565-9.
