= Ilse Fürstenberg =

German actress (1907–1976)

Ilse Fürstenberg (12 December 1907, in Berlin – 16 December 1976, in Basel) was a German actress, working on stage, screen, television and as voice actress.

== Selected filmography ==
- The Blue Angel (1930) - Raths Wirtschafterin / Maid
- M (1931) - (uncredited)
- The Captain from Köpenick (1931) - Marie Hoprecht
- Girls to Marry (1932)
- The Beautiful Adventure (1932)
- Unheimliche Geschichten (1932) - Frau in der Irrenanstalt
- The Testament of Cornelius Gulden (1932) - Frau Giesicke
- Hanneles Himmelfahrt (1934) - Wirtin
- The Csardas Princess (1934) - Mädi vom Chantant
- Jede Frau hat ein Geheimnis (1934)
- Glückspilze (1935) - Frau Roeder
- Hermine and the Seven Upright Men (1935) - Frau Kuser
- Forget Me Not (1935)
- Lady Windermere's Fan (1935) - Duchess of Barwick
- Artist Love (1935) - Frau Heller
- Frisians in Peril (1935) - Dörte Niegebüll
- Trouble Backstairs (1935) - Frau Irma Schulze
- Kater Lampe (1936) - Frau Ermscher
- Fräulein Veronika (1936) - Frau Kulicke
- Girls in White (1936) - Irina - seine Frau
- Die un-erhörte Frau (1936) - Helene, Stubenmädchen bei Brandt
- Der lustige Witwenball (1936)
- Susanne in the Bath (1936) - Reinemachefrau
- Nachtwache im Paradies (1937)
- Urlaub auf Ehrenwort (1938) - Frau Schmiedecke
- Wie einst im Mai (1938) - Mathilde, Haushälterin
- Skandal um den Hahn (1938) - Marie Maier - Mutter
- The Woman at the Crossroads (1938) - Frau Pawlowski
- Nanon (1938) - Die Magd
- In the Name of the People (1939) - Else Hartmann
- Salonwagen E 417 (1939) - Lautenschlägers spätere Frau
- Who's Kissing Madeleine? (1939) - Dorothy Simplon
- In letzter Minute (1939) - Minna
- D III 88 (1939) - Bäuerin
- Krach im Vorderhaus (1941) - Irma Schultze
- Ich klage an (1941)
- Annelie (1941) - Hausmädchen Ida
- Comrades (1941) - Pauline
- The Great Love (1942) - Luftschutzwartin im Mietshaus
- Ein Zug fährt ab (1942) - Portierfrau Mielke
- Du gehörst zu mir (1943) - Frau Friebe
- Münchhausen (1943) - Rieke Kuchenreutter (uncredited)
- An Old Heart Becomes Young Again (1943) - Portiersfrau von Brigitte (uncredited)
- Ein glücklicher Mensch (1943)
- I'll Carry You in My Arms (1943) - Dienstmädchen Lona
- A Beautiful Day (1944) - Briefträgerin
- Große Freiheit Nr. 7 (1944) - Gisa's mother
- Kamerad Hedwig (1945) - Anna Kluge
- Somewhere in Berlin (1946)
- Intimitäten (1948) - Mathilde Dorndorffs
- Law of Love (1949) - Frau Aktuarius Ketteler
- The Woman from Last Night (1950)
- The Sinful Border (1951)
- Prosecutor Corda (1953) - Grete
- Die Prinzessin und der Schweinehirt (1953)
- Father Is Being Stupid (1953) - Frau Kirchner, Wolfgangs Mutter
- The Golden Plague (1954) - Mrs. Försterling
- Canaris (1954) - Anna Lüdtke
- The Captain from Köpenick (1956) - Marie Hoprecht, Voigts Schwester
- Precocious Youth (1957) - Frau Messmann
- Schwarzwälder Kirsch (1958)
- Romarei, das Mädchen mit den grünen Augen (1958)
- The Scarlet Baroness (1959)
- Aus dem Tagebuch eines Frauenarztes (1959) - Frau Mägerlein
- Two Among Millions (1961) - Frau Lohmann
- When Sweet Moonlight Is Sleeping in the Hills (1969) - Frau Miller
- Die Feuerzangenbowle (1970) - Haushälterin von Prof. Crey

== Bibliography ==
- Kosta, Barbara. Willing Seduction: The Blue Angel, Marlene Dietrich, and Mass Culture. Berghahn Books, 2009
