= Is Your Honeymoon Really Necessary? =

1953 British film by Maurice Elvey

- Theatrical release poster
- Directed by: Maurice Elvey
- Written by: Talbot Rothwell
- Based on: Is Your Honeymoon Really Necessary? by Vivian Tidmarsh
- Produced by: David Dent
- Starring: Bonar Colleano; Diana Dors; David Tomlinson; Diana Decker
- Cinematography: Phil Grindrod
- Edited by: Lito Carruthers
- Music by: W.L. Trytel
- Distributed by: Adelphi Films; Associated Artists Productions
- Release date: September 1953
- Running time: 80 minutes
- Country: United Kingdom
- Language: English

Is Your Honeymoon Really Necessary? is a 1953 British comedy film directed by Maurice Elvey and starring Bonar Colleano, Diana Dors, David Tomlinson and Diana Decker. It was written by Talbot Rothwell based on Vivian Tidmarsh's 1944 West End hit play of the same name.

== Plot ==
When US Navy airman Commander Laurie Vining takes up his new posting in London with his new wife Gillian he has no idea that his first wife Candy Markham will turn up and threaten his marital bliss by claiming they are still married. Faithful confidant Hank Hanlon continually stirs things up and tries to keep order. Other lives that are changed forever by the intervention include lawyer Frank Betterton.

== Cast ==
- Bonar Colleano as Commander Laurie Vining
- Diana Dors as Candy Markham
- David Tomlinson as Frank Betterton
- Diana Decker as Gillian Vining
- Sid James as Hank Hanlon
- Audrey Freeman as Lucy
- Hubert Woodward as Hicks
- MacDonald Parke as Admiral Fields
- Lou Jacobi as Captain Noakes

== Production ==
The play debuted in 1944 in London, originally starring Ralph Lynn, and ran for almost three years. Film rights were bought in February 1953 as a vehicle for Diana Dors.

Filming took place over four weeks in April at Nettlefold Studios, Walton-on-Thames. Dors was paid a fee of £1,000.

== Critical reception ==
According to BFI's Screenonline, the "film belongs to Dors. Ideally cast as mischievous, ultra-blonde temptress Candy, she sashays towards centre stage with a seemingly effortless lightness of step, adding much-needed sparkle to well-worn material. While never appearing to take herself – or the script – the slightest bit seriously, she steals the show with careless assurance."

The Monthly Film Bulletin called it an "uneven bedroom farce. On the debit side: time-worn situations, bad timing; on the credit side: some good playing from David Tomlinson, as yet another shy, respectable Englishman, and from Diana Dors, responding to the essence of the piece beautifully by exuding 100 per cent sex."

Filmink said Dors was "full of life and vigour".

== See also ==
- The Disturbed Wedding Night (1950)
