= Marriage in Small Doses =

1939 film

- Directed by: Johannes Meyer
- Written by: Leo Lenz (play); Ralph Arthur Roberts (play); Rudolf F. Klein; Johannes Meyer
- Starring: Leny Marenbach; Johannes Riemann; Ralph Arthur Roberts
- Cinematography: Oskar Schnirch
- Edited by: Helmuth Schönnenbeck
- Music by: Franz Grothe; Will Meisel
- Production company: Cine-Allianz Tonfilm
- Distributed by: Bavaria Film
- Release date: 18 August 1939
- Running time: 96 minutes
- Country: Germany
- Language: German

Marriage in Small Doses (German: Ehe in Dosen) is a 1939 German musical comedy film directed by Johannes Meyer and starring Leny Marenbach, Johannes Riemann, and Ralph Arthur Roberts. It was based on a play, which was also turned into a Swedish film Variety Is the Spice of Life the same year.

== Cast ==
- Leny Marenbach as Nora Bagrat
- Johannes Riemann as Peter Bagrat, Komponist
- Ralph Arthur Roberts as Justizrat Windhorst
- Grethe Weiser as Mausi Blanke
- Hilde Weissner as Christa Andersen
- Hilde Hildebrand as Frau Conradi
- Rudolf Platte as Karl, Diener bei Bagrat
- Ellen Hille as Jette, Hausmädchen bei Bagrat
- Willi Schur as Toby, Kellner
- Gerhard Dammann as Briefträger
- Maria Seidler as Wirtschafterin bei Windhorst
- Erich Fiedler as 1. Kavalier
- Angelo Ferrari as 2. Kavalier
- Arthur Schröder as 3. Kavalier
- Ernö René as 4. Kavalier
- Irene Pfeiffer as 1. Tänzerin
- Hilla Höfer as 2. Tänzerin
- Walter Ruesta
- Bert Schmidt-Maris

== Bibliography ==
- Bock, Hans-Michael; Bergfelder, Tim, eds. (2009). The Concise Cinegraph: Encyclopaedia of German Cinema. New York: Berghahn Books. ISBN 978-1-57181-655-9.
