= Ewald Wenck =

German actor (1891–1981)

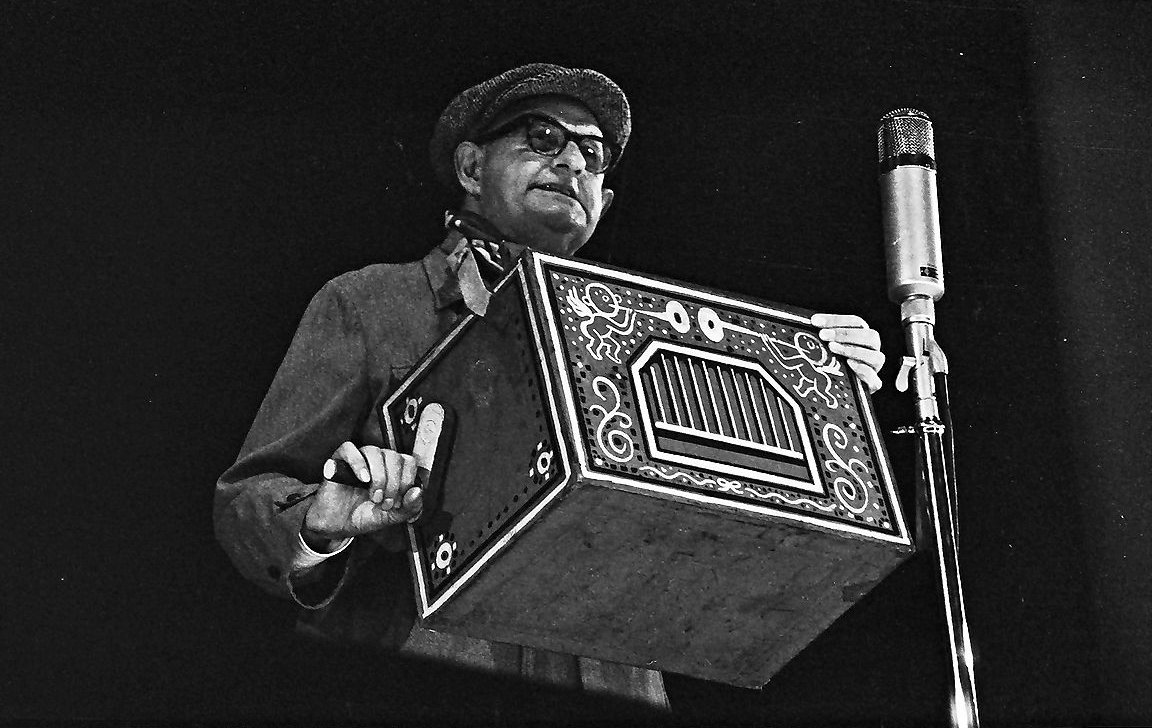
- Ewald Wenck during a guest performance in Die Insulaner, 1959.
- Born: 28 December 1891; Berlin, German Empire
- Died: 3 April 1981 (aged 89); West Berlin, West Germany
- Occupation: Actor
- Years active: 1919–1978

Ewald Wenck (28 December 1891 – 3 April 1981) was a German actor. He appeared in more than 230 films and television shows between 1919 and 1978.

== Selected filmography ==
- We Stick Together Through Thick and Thin (1929)
- The Shot in the Sound Film Studio (1930)
- Spoiling the Game (1932)
- Police Report (1934)
- Holiday From Myself (1934)
- Make Me Happy (1935)
- The Call of the Jungle (1936)
- Family Parade (1936)
- Donogoo Tonka (1936)
- Susanne in the Bath (1936)
- Savoy Hotel 217 (1936)
- Winter in the Woods (1936)
- The Traitor (1936)
- Talking About Jacqueline (1937)
- Meiseken (1937)
- Patriots (1937)
- The Beaver Coat (1937)
- The Roundabouts of Handsome Karl (1938)
- Triad (1938)
- The Day After the Divorce (1938)
- Between the Parents (1938)
- Mistake of the Heart (1939)
- Alarm at Station III (1939)
- Her Private Secretary (1940)
- Small Town Poet (1940)
- Wunschkonzert (1940)
- The Unfaithful Eckehart (1940)
- The Girl at the Reception (1940)
- Counterfeiters (1940)
- The Gasman (1941)
- Riding for Germany (1941)
- Jakko (1941)
- What Does Brigitte Want? (1941)
- Alarm (1941)
- The Great Love (1942)
- Two in a Big City (1942)
- We Make Music (1942)
- Carnival of Love (1943)
- The Golden Spider (1943)
- A Salzburg Comedy (1943)
- The Crew of the Dora (1943)
- Light of Heart (1943)
- Beloved Darling (1943)
- Melody of a Great City (1943)
- The Green Salon (1944)
- A Wife for Three Days (1944)
- Die Feuerzangenbowle (1944)
- The Woman of My Dreams (1944)
- Somewhere in Berlin (1946)
- No Place for Love (1947)
- Don't Play with Love (1949)
- The Woman from Last Night (1950)
- Dance Into Happiness (1951)
- Torreani (1951)
- Holiday From Myself (1952)
- Pension Schöller (1952)
- Josef the Chaste (1953)
- Knall and Fall as Detectives (1953)
- We'll Talk About Love Later (1953)
- Secretly Still and Quiet (1953)
- Lady's Choice (1953)
- Clivia (1954)
- Son Without a Home (1955)
- Charley's Aunt (1956)
- The Glass Tower (1957) - Portier
- A Thousand Stars Aglitter (1959)
- The Bird Seller (1962)
