= The Woman from Last Night =

1950 film directed by Arthur Maria Rabenalt

- German: Die Frau von gestern Nacht
- Directed by: Arthur Maria Rabenalt
- Written by: Curt Goetz-Pflug; Gustav Kampendonk
- Starring: Heli Finkenzeller; Albert Matterstock; Hilde Sessak
- Cinematography: Bruno Stephan
- Edited by: Walter von Bonhorst
- Music by: Herbert Windt
- Production company: Cinephon-Film
- Distributed by: Luxor-Film
- Release date: 2 June 1950
- Running time: 90 minutes
- Country: West Germany
- Language: German

The Woman from Last Night (German: Die Frau von gestern Nacht) is a 1950 West German comedy film directed by Arthur Maria Rabenalt and starring Heli Finkenzeller, Albert Matterstock, and Hilde Sessak. It was shot at the Tempelhof Studios in West Berlin. The film's sets were designed by the art director Gabriel Pellon.

== Cast ==
- Heli Finkenzeller as Heidi
- Albert Matterstock as Ruppert
- Emil Suhrmann
- Horst Breitenfeld
- Karl Finkenzeller
- Hans Stiebner
- Erich Dunskus
- Willi Rose
- Bruno Fritz
- Franz-Otto Krüger
- Werner Schott
- Paul Heidemann
- Hilde Sessak
- Anneliese Book
- Peter Rendalen
- Ewald Wenck
- Ilse Fürstenberg
- Ellen Bang
- Alwin Lippisch
- Harriet Warnke
