= Gottlieb Madl =

German film editor

- Occupation: Editor
- Years active: 1932-1959 (film)

Gottlieb Madl was a film editor who worked in the German film industry for many years. He edited the 1933 Nazi propaganda film S.A.-Mann Brand.

== Selected filmography ==
- The Tunnel (1933)
- The Master Detective (1933)
- S.A.-Mann Brand (1933)
- Inheritance in Pretoria (1934)
- The Fugitive from Chicago (1934)
- The King's Prisoner (1935)
- The Three Around Christine (1936)
- Street Music (1936)
- The Glass Ball (1937)
- Five Million Look for an Heir (1938)
- All Lies (1938)
- Gold in New Frisco (1939)
- The Leghorn Hat (1939)
- The Girl from Barnhelm (1940)
- The Eternal Spring (1940)
- The Fire Devil (1940)
- Venus on Trial (1941)
- What Does Brigitte Want? (1941)
- The Dark Day (1943)
- Journey into the Past (1943)
- A Heart Beats for You (1949)

== Bibliography ==
- Giesen, Rolf. Nazi Propaganda Films: A History and Filmography. McFarland & Company, 2003.
