= Leny Marenbach =

German actress (1907–1984)

- Born: 20 December 1907; Essen; German Empire
- Died: 26 January 1984 (aged 76); West Berlin; West Germany
- Occupation: Actress
- Years active: 1935 - 1960 (film)

Leny Marenbach (20 December 1907 – 26 January 1984) was a German film actress. She was a leading German actress of the Nazi era, appearing in films such as the biopic Friedemann Bach. After the Second World War, she appeared in several DEFA roles.

== Selected filmography ==
- If We All Were Angels (1936)
- Der Etappenhase (1937)
- Alarm in Peking (1937)
- The Model Husband (1937)
- Five Million Look for an Heir (1938)
- Target in the Clouds (1939)
- Marriage in Small Doses (1939)
- Central Rio (1939)
- Mistake of the Heart (1939)
- Woman Made to Measure (1940)
- What Does Brigitte Want? (1941)
- Friedemann Bach (1941)
- Wild Bird (1943)
- The Big Number (1943)
- That Was My Life (1944)
- How Do We Tell Our Children? (1949)

== Bibliography ==
- Schulte-Sasse, Linda. Entertaining the Third Reich: Illusions of Wholeness in Nazi Cinema. Duke University Press, 1996.
