= Albert Matterstock =

German actor

- Born: 13 September 1911; Leipzig, Saxony; German Empire
- Died: 29 June 1960 (aged 48); Hamburg, West Germany
- Occupation: Actor

Albert Matterstock (13 September 1911 – 29 June 1960) was a German film actor. He played the lead in the 1938 aviation film Target in the Clouds.

== Selected filmography ==
- Land of Love (1937)
- Serenade (1937)
- Yvette (1938)
- All Lies (1938)
- Target in the Clouds (1938)
- The Golden Mask (1939)
- Who's Kissing Madeleine? (1939)
- Our Miss Doctor (1940)
- What Does Brigitte Want? (1941)
- Much Ado About Nixi (1942)
- A Waltz with You (1943)
- Come Back to Me (1944)
- Ghost in the Castle (1947)
- The Woman from Last Night (1950)
- It Began at Midnight (1951)
- Closed Exit (1955)
- Three Birch Trees on the Heath (1956)

== Bibliography ==
- Paris, Michael. From the Wright Brothers to Top Gun: Aviation, Nationalism, and Popular Cinema. Manchester University Press, 1995.
