= What Does Brigitte Want? =

1941 film

- Directed by: Paul Martin
- Written by: Emil Burri; Martin Doerhoff (play); Peter Francke
- Starring: Leny Marenbach; Albert Matterstock; Fita Benkhoff
- Cinematography: Franz Koch
- Edited by: Gottlieb Madl
- Music by: Lothar Brühne
- Production company: Bavaria Film
- Distributed by: Bavaria Film
- Release date: 7 January 1941
- Running time: 93 minutes
- Country: Germany
- Language: German

What Does Brigitte Want? (German: Was will Brigitte?) is a 1941 German comedy film directed by Paul Martin and starring Leny Marenbach, Albert Matterstock and Fita Benkhoff.

The film's sets were designed by the art director Robert A. Dietrich. It was shot at the Bavaria Studios in Munich with location filming taking place near to Prague.

== Cast ==
- Leny Marenbach as Brigitte Arend
- Albert Matterstock as Stefan Roland - ein Komponist
- Fita Benkhoff as Beate Forbach
- Georg Alexander as Direktor Karl Forbach
- Harald Paulsen as Diener Georg
- Julius Bennet
- Erich Dunskus as Pförtner im Haus Lindermann
- Franz Fröhlich as Aushilfsdiener Oskar
- Adolf Gondrell as Lawyer Dr. Hans Otto Reuter
- Liselotte Hessler
- Willem Holsboer as Peter Schmidt
- Annemarie Holtz as Frau Lindemann
- Melanie Horeschowsky
- Josef Hübner
- Hildegard Kleinkemm
- Ellen Krug
- Else Mereny
- Rudolf Stadler as Zeitungshändler Klemm
- Flockina von Platen as Margot Reuter
- Hedwig Wangel as Klara Lehmann - die Zimmerwirtin aud Aushilfsköchin
- Ewald Wenck
- Carl Wery as Generaldirektor Boller

== Bibliography ==
- Hans-Michael Bock and Tim Bergfelder. The Concise Cinegraph: An Encyclopedia of German Cinema. Berghahn Books, 2009.
- Rentschler, Eric. The Ministry of Illusion: Nazi Cinema and Its Afterlife. Harvard University Press, 1996.
