= No Place for Love =

1947 film

- Heinz Lausch and Bruni Löbel
- Directed by: Hans Deppe
- Written by: Margarete Hackebeil; Wolfgang W. Parth; Hans Deppe
- Starring: Bruni Löbel; Heinz Lausch; Ernst Legal
- Cinematography: Kurt Schulz
- Edited by: Lilian Seng
- Music by: Hanson Milde-Meissner
- Production company: DEFA
- Distributed by: Sovexport Film
- Release date: 31 March 1947
- Running time: 82 minutes
- Country: Germany
- Language: German

No Place for Love (German: Kein Platz für Liebe) is a 1947 German comedy film directed by Hans Deppe and starring Bruni Löbel, Heinz Lausch and Ernst Legal. It was made in the Soviet Sector of Berlin by the state-controlled DEFA company. It is part of the post-war tradition of rubble films. Its plot revolves around the shortage of housing in the bombed-out city. It was shot at the Johannisthal Studios and on location around the city. The film's sets were designed by the art director Otto Erdmann and Kurt Herlth.

== Synopsis ==
While on leave in Berlin during the Second World War, a soldier named Hans meets a young woman named Monika. They fall in love and make plans for a future together after the war. Yet their later attempts to find an apartment and get married are hindered by the housing shortage and they have to live separately with relatives.

== Cast ==
- Bruni Löbel as Monika
- Heinz Lausch as Hans Winkelmann
- Ernst Legal as William Spier
- Elsa Wagner as Niobe
- Margarete Kupfer as Frau Kruse
- Hans Neie as Peter
- Wilhelm Bendow as Der Verdrießliche
- Franz-Otto Krüger as Der Sehnsüchtige
- Walter Gross
- Ewald Wenck
- Knut Hartwig
- Albert Venohr as
- Eva Maria Scholz
- Günther Lobe
- Horst Gentzen
- Ingeborg Krebs
- Erich Dunskus
- Lili Schoenborn-Anspach
- Toni Tetzlaff
- Hilde Sonntag
- Antonie Jaeckel
- Else Ehser
- Max Paetz

== Bibliography ==
- Karl, Lars & Skopal, Pavel. Cinema in Service of the State: Perspectives on Film Culture in the GDR and Czechoslovakia, 1945–1960. Berghahn Books, 2015.
