= Rotation (film) =

1949 film

- Directed by: Wolfgang Staudte
- Written by: Erwin Klein; Fritz Staudte; Wolfgang Staudte
- Starring: Paul Esser; Irene Korb; Werner Peters
- Cinematography: Bruno Mondi
- Edited by: Lilian Seng
- Music by: H.W. Wiemann
- Production company: DEFA
- Distributed by: Sovexport Film
- Release date: 16 September 1949
- Running time: 80 minutes
- Country: East Germany
- Language: German

Rotation is a 1949 East German drama film directed by Wolfgang Staudte and starring Paul Esser, Irene Korb and Werner Peters. It was produced under the auspices of the DEFA film studio in East Germany. It began filming on 29 September 1948 and premiered in theaters on 16 September 1949.

The film was partly shot at the Althoff Studios in Potsdam. The art directors Willy Schiller and Arthur Schwarz worked on the film's sets.

== Plot ==
The film opens to scenes of Berlin during World War II, with the ongoing war depicted by bombs and explosions, both onscreen and in the background soundtrack. The film then jumps back twenty years in time, and, through a series of vignettes about worker Hans Behnke, traces the way in which a typical worker who opposes Nazi Party ideology could be drawn into complying and cooperating with the Nazi regime. Significant vignettes include depictions of the high unemployment in 1920s Germany and later, the threat to Hans's job due to his failure to belong to the Nazi party. It is implied that Hans's complicity with the Nazi regime rises out of a desire to be able to provide for his family and not return to the ranks of the Arbeitslos (unemployed).

Hans ultimately does join the Nazi party, but still shows signs of disagreement with their ideology. He eventually aids a resistance group in printing anti-war propaganda, and is finally turned in to the authorities by his son Helmut. Hans is then put in jail, and the timeline returns to that given at the very beginning of the film. Hans is eventually freed from jail, but his wife, Charlotte, has been killed in the war.

The end of the film depicts Hans's reconciliation with his son Helmut, and Helmut's beginning of a new life with his girlfriend. The ending scenes of the film echo those of the beginning in which Hans and Charlotte start their life, but with dialog and visual symbolism suggesting that Helmut will not repeat his father's mistakes and his father's complicity.

== Critical reception ==
Critics noted that Hans Behnke's character represented the typical German worker, and that his reasons for cooperating with the Nazi regime resonated with viewers who had lived through the war. Viewers in 1949 saw themselves in Behnke. As one critic wrote, "dieser Film zeigt, wie es wirklich war" (this film shows how it really was).

Staudte explicitly stated that the intended message of the film was against war: in his words, his goal was to "show how it could come to such an unimaginable catastrophe, in order to help ensure that it will not come to a greater catastrophe in the future."

The film won the Golden Leopard at the Locarno International Film Festival.

== Main cast ==
- Paul Esser as Hans Behnke
- Irene Korb as Charlotte Blank Behnke
- Karl Heinz Deickert as Hellmuth Behnke
- Reinhold Bernt as Kurt Blank
- Reinhard Kolldehoff as Rudi Wille
- Werner Peters as Udo Schulze
- Brigitte Krause as Inge
- Albert Johannes as Personalchef
- Theodor Vogeler as 1. SD-Mann
- Walter Tarrach as 2. SD-Mann
- Valeska Stock as Hebamme
