= Alarm in Peking =

1937 film

- Directed by: Herbert Selpin
- Written by: Herbert Selpin; Walter Zerlett-Olfenius
- Produced by: Eduard Kubat
- Starring: Gustav Fröhlich; Leny Marenbach; Peter Voß
- Cinematography: Friedl Behn-Grund
- Edited by: Lena Neumann
- Music by: Werner Bochmann
- Production company: Minerva Tonfilm
- Distributed by: Terra Film; Tobis-Sascha Film (Austria)
- Release date: 19 August 1937
- Running time: 89 minutes
- Country: Germany
- Language: German

Alarm in Peking is a 1937 German adventure film directed by Herbert Selpin and starring Gustav Fröhlich, Leny Marenbach, and Peter Voß. It is set against the backdrop of the 1900 Boxer Rebellion in China. German filmmakers had frequently used China as a setting since the 1910s, but from 1931 onwards they made a series of films with political overtones. It was shot at the Johannisthal Studios in Berlin. The film's sets were designed by the art director Alfred Bütow and Willi Herrmann.

== Plot ==
It is July 5, 1900, and the slogan 'China to the Chinese' has found a strong echo throughout Asia. Bitter times have come for the Europeans and Americans..." -- this is how the story begins.

That night, two European telegraph operators are murdered by Chinese boxers in a small hut near a Chinese railroad line. The German lieutenant Brock, leader of a cavalry patrol from the naval battalion, and his comrade Sergeant Mück hear the shots, but arrive too late. Brock then stops the next express train on the open track, loads up his unit along with the horses and gets a ride to Tientsin as quickly as possible. Shortly before this, there had already been a worrying incident for the European colonial rulers in China. Contrary to what they had been told, the crates in the baggage car did not contain machine parts, but grenades. Tu-Hang, the Chinese managing director of a German-owned factory for agricultural machinery, for which the freight was destined, had the baggage master, who had made this discovery in a damaged crate, stabbed by one of his men and thrown out of the moving train. None of the European passengers suspect that something is brewing against the foreigners. Not even the factory owner's sister Maria, who was accompanying Tu-Hang on the train.

Mück almost had the explosive cargo thrown out of the carriage to make room for the horses to be stowed away. However, Maria's appearance prompted Brock to stow the crates elsewhere, so that the ammunition for the planned Chinese uprising finally reached its destination. In Tientsin, the travelers learn that rail traffic has now been shut down. Maria, who actually wanted to meet up with a good friend, the British officer Captain Cunningham, finds out that he has been sent to Beijing. There, he and another 416 soldiers from a total of eight nations are to protect the entire legation district against a possible threat from outside. Maria originally wanted to travel on to Shanghai in order to make the journey home to Europe from there. However, Tu-Hang, who enjoys her trust, is able to persuade her to travel to Beijing and lobby the German consul general to release the crates containing the secret, deadly cargo without any controls.

The crates are indeed released, and Maria's brother's good name vouches for the accuracy of the description of the contents. In the meantime, Brock and his men have also arrived in Beijing. Cunningham quickly realizes that in Brock, whom he has known for a long time, he has a rival for Maria's favour. During a party at the British legation, shots are suddenly fired at the ballroom from outside and the soldiers immediately run to the outer line of defense around the district. Now Tu-Hang shows his true colors. He attacks with his men to break the resistance of the “white devils” as quickly as possible. The first thing to go up in flames is the Belgian embassy, which is located outside the diplomatic quarter. The Austrian corvette captain von Radain takes command as the highest-ranking officer, with Cunningham as his deputy. Tu-Hang has miscalculated: the foreigners cannot be defeated militarily that quickly. A siege ensues. Tu-Hang soon learns that European troops are on their way to relieve the besieged. Meanwhile, the besieged are running out of food.

The Italian ensign Torelli and the German private Lüdecke disguise themselves as Chinese and, with the help of the Chinese woman Yung-Li, who serves the Europeans as a prostitute, sneak into the Chinese districts of Beijing to bring food from there to the besieged fortress. When they both want to buy a box of canned food, Lüdecke's cap slips off his head and he is exposed. Shots are fired and Lüdecke is seriously wounded. However, they both manage to escape with the crate, while Yung-Li is held by the boxers who rush over. When the crate they brought with them is opened in the envoy quarter and it turns out that the suspected crate is one of Tu-Hang's ammunition crates from the train, some people in the envoy quarter begin to suspect that Maria might have something to do with the ammunition smuggling. After all, it was she who had lobbied the consul general to release the cargo destined for her brother without checking it. Brock, who believes in her innocence, and Cunningham, who is also in love with Maria, then clash. In another battle with the Boxers, Commander Radain is fatally injured, so that Cunningham now takes command as the next highest-ranking officer.

Meanwhile, Yung-Li has been taken to Tu-Hang. He lets her live because he still needs her. He demands that she bring Maria to him. Yung-Li and Maria reach Tu-Hang via secret sneak paths. Maria wants to find out from Tu-Hang personally whether her brother really had anything to do with the arms smuggling. The Chinese leader denies this. She reproaches Tu-Hang for the serious breach of trust, but he replies, all patriotic: “What I did, I did for China”. However, in view of the clear military superiority of his boxers, he then suggests that she should not return to the embassy district. When Maria makes it clear to him that she stands by her people just as much as he stands by his, he lets her go without hesitation. In the meantime, Brock, who now suspects how well armed the Chinese are after opening the grenade box that accidentally got into the embassy quarter, tries to force the military decision with a daring one-man commando. At night, he leaves the diplomatic quarter and heads for the Chinese city. Finally, he scrambles up a wall in breakneck fashion.

Once at the top, he hurls a load of burning petrol at the Boxers' ammunition depot, which then explodes. Brock flees head over heels to escape the Chinese pursuing him. Maria, who has now returned to the embassy district, informs Cunningham of what Tu-Hang has told her and is able to persuade the Brit to finally help his old buddy Brock. “He keeps his promise, but dies a soldier's death in the process. Tu-Hang also falls. The going gets tough -- the liberators finally arrive. They shouldn't have come a day later. The whites are saved. The song of comradeship drowns out the lament for the victims of the battle."

== Cast ==
- Gustav Fröhlich as Oberleutnant Brock
- Leny Marenbach as Maria
- Peter Voß as Captain Cunningham
- Herbert Hübner as Korvettenkapitän von Radain
- Bernhard Minetti as Tu-Hang
- Rosa Jung as Yung-Li
- Paul Westermeier as Sergeant Mück
- Ferdinand Classen as Tschang
- Joachim Rake as Leutnant Torelli
- Günther Lüders as Gefreiter Lüdecke
- Hugo Fischer-Köppe as Sergeant Micky
- Arthur Reinhardt as Brandes
- Adolf Fischer as Reiter
- Leopold von Ledebur as Generalkonsul
- Georg H. Schnell as Gesandter
- Karl Günther as Kommandeur

== Production ==
The actress Rosa Jung, who was just 29 years old at the end of filming, actually came from Beijing and was the only ethnic Chinese woman in the film. She was living in Berlin-Friedenau at the time. In addition to Chinese, Rosa Jung also spoke German, English and French.She also appeared in Richard Eichberg|'s legendary Indian two-parter The Tiger of Eschnapur and The Indian Tomb in 1938. After that, she disappeared from the public eye.

== Release ==
Alarm in Peking was released on August 20, 1937.

Viktor Klemperer described the production as “a really good piece”: “The amusing thing about the film is that the boxers are not just portrayed as cruel villains: they are patriots and nationalists”.

Chiang Kai-shek spoke to Werner von Blomberg about his criticism of the film as it depicted the Europeans in a positive light in contrast to the Chinese. Joseph Goebbels wanted to ban the film, but Adolf Hitler declined to do so.

== Works cited ==
- Niven, Bill (2018). Hitler and Film: The Führer's Hidden Passion. Yale University Press. ISBN 9780300200362.
- Weniger, Kay (2001). Das große Personenlexikon des Films. Die Schauspieler, Regisseure, Kameraleute, Produzenten, Komponisten, Drehbuchautoren, Filmarchitekten, Ausstatter, Kostümbildner, Cutter, Tontechniker, Maskenbildner und Special Effects Designer des 20. Jahrhunderts. Schwarzkopf & Schwarzkopf Verlag. ISBN 3896023403.

== Bibliography ==
- Bock, Hans-Michael; Bergfelder, Tim, eds. (2009). The Concise Cinegraph: Encyclopaedia of German Cinema. New York: Berghahn Books. ISBN 978-1-57181-655-9.
- Baskett, Michael (2008). The Attractive Empire: Transnational Film Culture in Imperial Japan. Honolulu: University of Hawaii Press. ISBN 978-0-8248-3163-9.
- Rentschler, Eric (1996). The Ministry of Illusion: Nazi Cinema and Its Afterlife. Cambridge, Mass: Harvard University Press. ISBN 978-0-674-57640-7.
- Klemperer, Victor (2020). Licht und Schatten. Kinotagebuch 1929-1945. Berlin, Germany: Aufbau-Verlag. ISBN 978-3-351-03832-8.
