= Must We Get Divorced? (1953 film) =

1953 film

- German film poster
- German: Muß man sich gleich scheiden lassen?
- Directed by: Hans Schweikart
- Written by: Maria Niklisch; Hans Schweikart
- Produced by: Harald Braun; Georg Richter
- Starring: Hardy Krüger; Ruth Leuwerik; Tilda Thamar
- Cinematography: Helmut Ashley
- Edited by: Claus von Boro; Hilwa von Boro
- Music by: Franz Grothe
- Production company: N.D.F.-Produktion
- Distributed by: Schorcht Filmverleih; Sascha Film (Austria)
- Release date: 2 October 1953
- Running time: 91 minutes
- Country: West Germany
- Language: German

Must We Get Divorced? (German: Muß man sich gleich scheiden lassen?) is a 1953 West German comedy film directed by Hans Schweikart and starring Hardy Krüger, Ruth Leuwerik and Tilda Thamar. It was made at the Bavaria Studios in Munich. The film's sets were designed by the art director Fritz Lück and Hans Sohnle. Location filming took place in Lucerne and at the Nürburgring.

== Plot ==
After a Formula One driver suffers an accident, he goes to Switzerland to recover where he falls in love with an Argentine millionaire. On returning to Germany he tells his wife, and they soon appear to be heading toward a divorce.

== Cast ==
- Hardy Krüger as Andreas von Doerr
- Ruth Leuwerik as Garda von Doerr
- Tilda Thamar as Joan de Portago
- Hans Söhnker as Dr. Algys
- Fita Benkhoff as Elisabeth Lindpaintner
- Gustav Knuth as Dr. Spitzkoetter
- Karl Schönböck as Prosecutor Paul
- Paul Bildt as Professor
- Peer Schmidt as Theobald
- Inge Konradi as Bettina
- Charlotte Witthauer as Frl. Müller
- Günther Lüders as Karlchen, Mixer
- Therese Giehse as Frau Holzer
- Rudolf Vogel as Herr Huber
- Walter Janssen as Hotelportier im 'Savoy'
- Dieter Borsche
