= It Began at Midnight =

1951 film

- Directed by: Peter Paul Brauer
- Written by: Friedrich Dammann; Werner P. Zibaso
- Produced by: Alfred Bittins
- Starring: Winnie Markus; Albert Matterstock; Heli Finkenzeller
- Cinematography: Otto Baecker
- Edited by: Walter von Bonhorst
- Music by: Herbert Jarczyk
- Production company: Cinephon-Film
- Distributed by: Fortuna-Filmverleih
- Release date: 5 January 1951
- Running time: 96 minutes
- Country: West Germany
- Language: German

It Began at Midnight (German: Es begann um Mitternacht) is a 1951 West German comedy crime film directed by Peter Paul Brauer and starring Winnie Markus, Albert Matterstock and Heli Finkenzeller. It was shot at the Spandau Studios in West Berlin and on location around the city. The film's sets were designed by the art director Kurt Herlth.

== Synopsis ==
A lawyer assists a young woman to break into a house, as she claims she has lost her keys. In fact she is breaking in to recover some love letters a relation of hers had written to the owner a shady baron. The baron reports the robbery to the police, and the lawyer finds himself being accused of stealing jewellery from the property.

== Cast ==
- Winnie Markus as die Einbrecherin
- Albert Matterstock as der Rechtsanwalt
- Heli Finkenzeller as die Schwiegermutter
- Werner Finck as der Baron
- Jakob Tiedtke
- Rudolf Platte
- Ida Wüst
- Ernst Waldow
- Walter Gross
- Rolf Weih
- Ellen Bang

== Bibliography ==
- Hoffmann, Hilmar & Schobert, Walter (ed.) Zwischen gestern und morgen: westdeutscher Nachkriegsfilm 1946-1962. Deutsches Filmmuseum, 1989.
- Wiesen, Jonathan. West German Industry and the Challenge of the Nazi Past: 1945–1955. University of North Carolina Press, 2004.
