= Melody of Fate =

1950 film

- Directed by: Hans Schweikart
- Written by: Paul Baudisch; Adolf Schütz
- Produced by: Rolf Meyer; Helmuth Volmer
- Starring: Brigitte Horney; Viktor de Kowa; Mathias Wieman
- Cinematography: Franz Weihmayr
- Edited by: Walter von Bonhorst
- Music by: Werner Eisbrenner
- Production company: Junge Film-Union Rolf Meyer
- Distributed by: Neue Filmverleih
- Release date: 6 October 1950
- Running time: 88 minutes
- Country: West Germany
- Language: German

Melody of Fate (German: Melodie des Schicksals) is a 1950 West German drama film directed by Hans Schweikart and starring Brigitte Horney, Viktor de Kowa and Mathias Wieman. It was shot at the Tempelhof Studios in Berlin. The film's sets were designed by the art director Franz Schroedter.

== Synopsis ==
A love triangle develops between the wife of a composer and a celebrated conductor.

== Cast ==
- Brigitte Horney as Carola
- Viktor de Kowa as Ewald Bergius
- Mathias Wieman as Martin Ehrling
- Fita Benkhoff as Betty Müller
- Maria Litto as Lill aus der Colombo-Bar
- Otto Gebühr as Professor Ahrens
- Franz Schafheitlin as Hugo Müller
- Friedrich Joloff as Amerikaner in der Colombo-Bar
- Reinhard Kolldehoff
- Herbert B. Tenbrook
- Erich Dunskus
- Paul Gunther
- Peter Petersz
- Ilka Hugo
- Paul Mederow

== Bibliography ==
- Bock, Hans-Michael; Bergfelder, Tim, eds. (2009). The Concise Cinegraph: Encyclopaedia of German Cinema. Berghahn Books. ISBN 978-1-57181-655-9.
