= My Daughter Doesn't Do That =

1940 film

- Poster
- Directed by: Hans H. Zerlett
- Written by: Kálmán Csathó (play); Hans H. Zerlett
- Starring: Ralph Arthur Roberts; Erika von Thellmann; Geraldine Katt
- Cinematography: Georg Bruckbauer
- Edited by: Ella Ensink; Reinhold Steinborn
- Music by: Leo Leux
- Production company: Euphono-Film
- Release date: 1 June 1940
- Running time: 89 minutes
- Country: Germany
- Language: German

My Daughter Doesn't Do That (German: Meine Tochter tut das nicht) is a 1940 German romantic comedy film directed by Hans H. Zerlett and starring Ralph Arthur Roberts, Erika von Thellmann, and Geraldine Katt.

The film's sets were designed by the art directors Carl Böhm and Erich Czerwonski.

== Cast ==
- Ralph Arthur Roberts as R.A. Dr. Franz Kugler
- Erika von Thellmann as Elli, seine Frau
- Geraldine Katt as Lisa, beider Tochter
- Lina Carstens as Baronin Liebrenz
- Rolf Wanka as Georg Bartenberg
- Wolfgang Klein as Rudi Seiler
- Christl Lerche as Inge Förster
- Gerda Maria Terno as Helen Olbrich
- Kurt Waitzmann as Willy Dahlmann
- Erich Fiedler as Max Heßler
- Ellen Hille as Therese, Mädchen bei Kugler
- Rudolf Platte as Paul, Diener bei der Baronin
- Fritz Hoopts as Kargel, Gemüsehändler
- Eva Tinschmann as Tina, Mamsell bei der Baronin
- Hilde Hildebrand as Sängerin

== Bibliography ==
- Bock, Hans-Michael; Bergfelder, Tim, eds. (2009). The Concise Cinegraph: Encyclopaedia of German Cinema. New York: Berghahn Books. ISBN 978-1-57181-655-9.
