= Fritz Lück =

German art director

- Born: 20 November 1880; Berlin, German Empire
- Died: 8 April 1967 (aged 86); Geretsried, Bavaria; West Germany
- Occupation: Art director
- Years active: 1923–1957 (film)

Fritz Lück (1880-1967) was a German painter and art director who designed the film sets on a number of productions from the silent era through to the post-Second World War period. He also worked in theatrical set design, particularly during the 1920s and 1930s. He worked on Nazi propaganda films such as Carl Peters and Titanic. Later he was employed on émigré Fritz Kortner's 1949 film The Last Illusion.

== Selected filmography ==
- The Island of Tears (1923)
- A Woman, an Animal, a Diamond (1923)
- Inge Larsen (1923)
- The New Land (1924)
- The Girl from America (1925)
- New Year's Eve on Alexanderplatz (1939)
- Her Private Secretary (1940)
- Trenck the Pandur (1940)
- Ich klage an (1941)
- Geheimakte W.B.1 (1942)
- Secret File W.B.1 (1942)
- Titanic (1943)
- The Degenhardts (1944)
- Ghost in the Castle (1947)
- The Appeal to Conscience (1949)
- The Last Illusion (1949)
- Schuß um Mitternacht (1950)
- The Disturbed Wedding Night (1950)
- The White Hell of Pitz Palu (1950)
- Who Is This That I Love? (1950)
- The Falling Star (1950)
- Eine Frau mit Herz (1951)
- The Secret of a Marriage (1951)
- Father Needs a Wife (1952)
- That Can Happen to Anyone (1952)
- Fanfare of Marriage (1953)
- Must We Get Divorced? (1953)
- Ludwig II (1955)

== Bibliography ==
- Giesen, Rolf. Nazi Propaganda Films: A History and Filmography. McFarland, 2003.
- Langford, Michelle. Directory of World Cinema: Germany. Intellect Books, 2012.
