= Walter von Bonhorst =

German film editor

- Born: 21 October 1904; Frankfurt, German Empire
- Died: 21 May 1978 (aged 75); Schweinfurt, West Germany
- Occupation: Editor
- Years active: 1933-1970 (film)

Walter von Bonhorst (1904–1978) was a German film editor. During the Nazi era he was employed at Tobis Film and UFA.

== Selected filmography ==
- Victoria (1935)
- Maria the Maid (1936)
- Don't Promise Me Anything (1937)
- The Kreutzer Sonata (1937)
- You and I (1938)
- The Day After the Divorce (1938)
- Renate in the Quartet (1939)
- Nanette (1940)
- Bismarck (1940)
- Two in a Big City (1942)
- The Bath in the Barn (1943)
- A Beautiful Day (1944)
- Journey to Happiness (1948)
- Love '47 (1949)
- My Niece Susanne (1950)
- Melody of Fate (1950)
- The Woman from Last Night (1950)
- It Began at Midnight (1951)
- Dance Into Happiness (1951)
- Stips (1951)
- Rose of the Mountain (1952)
- Pension Schöller (1952)
- The Divorcée (1953)
- The Cousin from Nowhere (1953)
- Mask in Blue (1953)
- Conchita and the Engineer (1954)
- I Was an Ugly Girl (1955)
- Liane, Jungle Goddess (1956)
- The Big Chance (1957)
- Paradise for Sailors (1959)
- The Avenger (1960)
- Willy the Private Detective (1960)
- We Cellar Children (1960)
- The Sky Is Blue (1964, TV film)
- What Is the Matter with Willi? (1970)
- Under the Roofs of St. Pauli (1970)

== Bibliography ==
- Giesen, Rolf. Nazi Propaganda Films: A History and Filmography. McFarland, 2003.
