= Trouble Backstairs (1949 film) =

1949 film

- Directed by: Erich Kobler
- Written by: Maximilian Böttcher (play); Karl Peter Gillmann; Jo Hanns Rösler; Erich Kobler
- Produced by: Willy Zeyn
- Starring: Paul Dahlke; Fita Benkhoff; Ursula Herking; Bruni Löbel
- Cinematography: Werner Krien
- Edited by: E. Martin
- Music by: Hans Georg Schütz
- Production company: Willy Zeyn-Film
- Distributed by: Schorcht Filmverleih
- Release date: 4 July 1949
- Running time: 85 minutes
- Country: West Germany
- Language: German

Trouble Backstairs (German: Krach im Hinterhaus) is a 1949 West German comedy film directed by Erich Kobler and starring Paul Dahlke, Fita Benkhoff and Ursula Herking. It was based on a play of the same title by Maximilian Böttcher, which had previously been turned into the 1935 film Trouble Backstairs.

== Cast ==
- Paul Dahlke as August Krüger
- Fita Benkhoff as Irma Schulze
- Ursula Herking as Malchen Krüger
- Bruni Löbel as Edeltraud Panse
- Traute Rose as Frau Bock
- Gisela von Jagen as Ilse Bock, ihre Tochter
- Carl Kuhlmann as Oberpostschaffner Hermann Schulze
- Ilse Melcher as Paula, seine Tochter
- Bum Krüger as Gustav Kluge, Bäckermeister
- Ernst von Klipstein as Assessor Dr. Erich Horn
- Friedrich Domin as Justizrat Dr. Horn, sein Vater
- Franz Schafheitlin as Prosecutor
- Walter Janssen as Amtsgerichtsrat Meier
- Hilli Wildenhain as Frau Puschke

== Bibliography ==
- Goble, Alan. The Complete Index to Literary Sources in Film. Walter de Gruyter, 1 Jan 1999.
