= Bruni Löbel =

German actress (1920–2006)

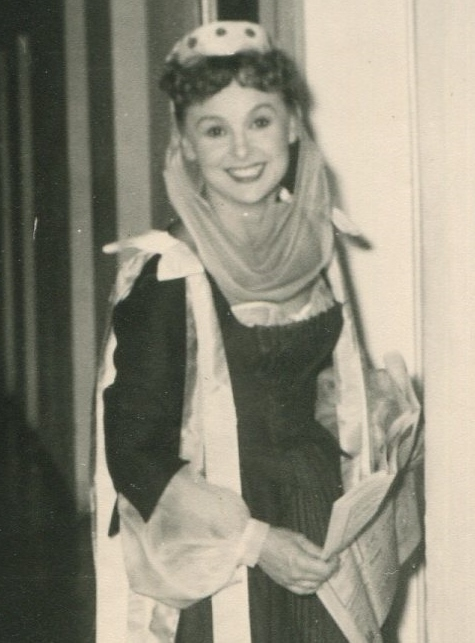
- Bruni Löbel in 1957
- Born: 20 December 1920; Chemnitz, Germany
- Died: 27 September 2006 (aged 85); Mühldorf am Inn, Germany
- Occupation: Actress
- Years active: 1939–2006 (film & TV)
- Spouse(s): Gerhard Bronner (1955–1959); Holger Hagen (1971–1996)

Bruni Löbel (born Brunhilde Melitta Löbel; 20 December 1920 – 27 September 2006) was a German stage, film and television actress. She was married to the composer Gerhard Bronner and the actor Holger Hagen. Löbel appeared in a number of television serials, including Timm Thaler, Storm of Love and Forsthaus Falkenau.

== Selected filmography ==
- Front Theatre (1942)
- Love Letters (1944)
- Quax in Africa (1947)
- No Place for Love (1947)
- Trouble Backstairs (1949)
- Don't Play with Love (1949)
- Unknown Sender (1950)
- The Big Lift (1950)
- Father Needs a Wife (1952)
- Irene in Trouble (1953)
- Secrets of the City (1955)
- Beloved Enemy (1955)
- Special Delivery (1955)
- The Crammer (1958)
- The Beautiful Adventure (1959)
- Almost Angels (1962)
- Kurzer Prozess (1967)
- The Garbage Dump (1975, TV film)
- Polizeiinspektion 1 (1977–1988, TV series)
- Timm Thaler (1979, TV miniseries)
- Ich heirate eine Familie (1983–1986, TV series)
- Lorentz & Söhne (1988, TV series)
- Forsthaus Falkenau (1989–2006, TV series)
- Storm of Love (2006, TV series)

== Bibliography ==
- Palmer, R. Barton. Shot on Location: Postwar American Cinema and the Exploration of Real Place. Rutgers University Press, 2016.

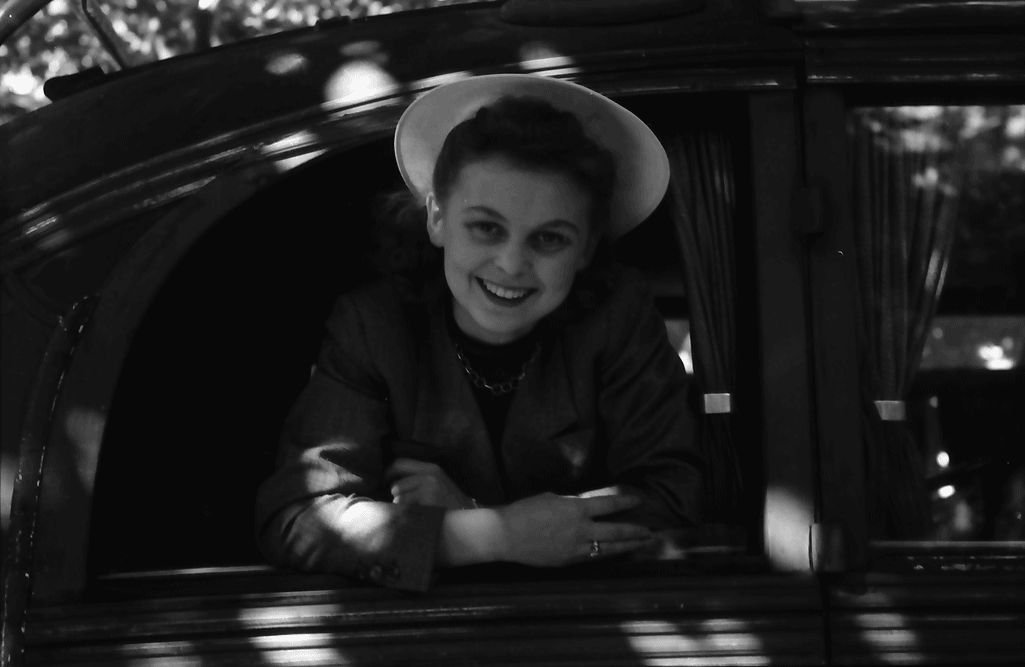
Bruni Löbel in Bucharest in 1941
