= Hans Schweikart =

German film director

- Born: 1 October 1895; Berlin, German Empire
- Died: 1 December 1975 (aged 80); Munich, West Germany
- Occupations: Film director, actor
- Years active: 1919–1974

Hans Schweikart (1 October 1895 – 1 December 1975) was a German film director, actor and screenwriter. He directed 28 films between 1938 and 1968. He wrote for the film The Marriage of Mr. Mississippi, which was entered into the 11th Berlin International Film Festival.

== Selected filmography ==
- Out of the Depths (1919)
- The House on the Moon (1921)
- The Infernal Power (1922)
- The Doll Maker of Kiang-Ning (1923)
- Two Children (1924)
- Hunting You (1929)
- The Girl with a Good Reputation (1938)
- Liberated Hands (1939)
- The Girl from Barnhelm (1940)
- Comrades (1941)
- The Girl from Fano (1941)
- The Comedians (1941 - produced)
- The Endless Road (1943)
- I Need You (1944)
- Insolent and in Love (1948)
- Night of the Twelve (1949)
- Law of Love (1949)
- Beloved Liar (1950)
- Melody of Fate (1950)
- That Can Happen to Anyone (1952)
- Must We Get Divorced? (1953)
- A House Full of Love (1954)
- The Blue Danube (1955)
- Stage Fright (1960)
- Agatha, Stop That Murdering! (1960)
- The Marriage of Mr. Mississippi (1961 - writer)
- A Woman Needs Loving (1969)
