= Althoff Studios =

Film studios in Berlin

- Native name: Althoff-Atelier
- Type: Film studio
- Industry: Film / Television
- Founded: 1939
- Defunct: 1997
- Headquarters: Potsdam-Babelsberg, Brandenburg, Germany
- Owner: DEFA (1946–1990s)

The Althoff Studios (German: Althoff-Atelier) were film studios located in Potsdam outside the German capital Berlin.

The studios were constructed in 1939 by the film producer Gustav Althoff who controlled the independent company Aco-Film. The original building was a former restaurant, but Althoff soon expanded the site by adding a larger sound stage.

The studios were located close to the film city of Babelsberg which was the centre of production during the Nazi era, used by large German companies such as UFA and Terra. The Althoff Studios catered instead to smaller, independent films such as those made under the Berlin Film banner.

The studios were captured by the Red Army during the Battle of Berlin and were then used for dubbing Soviet films for release in Germany. After the Second World War they were located in the Soviet Sector and were used by Communist-backed DEFA film concern which would become the state-owned monopoly of East Germany.

DEFA was officially launched in a ceremony at the studios in 1946. The same year they began shooting the first post-war German film The Murderers Are Among Us. A large set was constructed at Althoff for the expensive 1949 production Rotation. Later, DEFA used it increasingly to make documentary films.

Subsequently they were also home to television production. In 1997 the studios were sold-off for development as real estate.

== Bibliography ==
- Daniela Berghahn. Hollywood Behind the Wall: The Cinema of East Germany. Manchester University Press, 2005.
- Anke Pinkert. Film and Memory in East Germany. Indiana University Press, 2008.

== See also ==
- Staaken Studios
- Tempelhof Studios
