= Maximilian Böttcher =

German writer

- Born: 20 June 1872; Schönwalde
- Died: 16 May 1950 (aged 77); Eisenach
- Occupation: Writer

Maximilian Böttcher (20 June 1872 in Schönwalde – 16 May 1950 in Eisenach) was a German writer. He joined the Nazi Party (NSDAP) in 1937.

== Works ==
- Das Liebesfest des Waldfreiherrn
- Die Blankenburgs
- Die Wolfrechts
- Ewige Sehnsucht
- Krach im Hinterhaus
- Tauroggen
- Willst du Richter sein?
