= Faded Melody =

1938 film directed by Viktor Tourjansky

- Directed by: Viktor Tourjansky
- Written by: Emil Burri
- Produced by: Ulrich Mohrbutter
- Starring: Brigitte Horney; Willy Birgel; Carl Raddatz; Hans Brausewetter
- Cinematography: Günther Rittau
- Edited by: Walter Fredersdorf
- Music by: Marta Linz
- Production company: UFA
- Distributed by: UFA
- Release date: 17 April 1938
- Running time: 98 minutes
- Country: Germany
- Language: German

Faded Melody (German: Verklungene Melodie) is a 1938 German drama film directed by Viktor Tourjansky and starring Brigitte Horney, Willy Birgel and Carl Raddatz. The film was made by Germany's largest studio of the era UFA. It was shot at the Babelsberg Studios in Potsdam and on location in French Algeria, New York City and Berlin. The film's sets were designed by the art directors Hermann Asmus and Max Mellin. It premiered at Berlin's Gloria-Palast.

== Synopsis ==
Horney and Birgel play characters engaged in a troubled transatlantic romance, with she based in New York City and he in Berlin.

== Partial cast ==
- Brigitte Horney as Barbara Lorenz
- Willy Birgel as Thomas Gront
- Carl Raddatz as Werner Gront
- Hans Brausewetter as Steffken
- Vera von Langen as Olga, Thomas' Freundin
- Silvia de Bettini as Sonja
- Erich Fiedler as Freddy
- Karl Platen as Karl, Diener
- Andrews Engelmann as Casiez
- Bill Bocket as Léon
- Achim von Biel as Schmidt, Thomas' Sekretär
- Angelo Ferrari as Der Kellner bei der Silvesterfeier
- Jens von Hagen as Das Mädchen bei Barbara
- Hilde Heinrich as Die Krankenschwester
- Carl Merznicht as Der Assistenzarzt
- Pia Mietens as Ein Gast bei Olga, die sich nach Thomas erkundigt
- Michael von Newlinsky as Ein französischer Sergeant am Flughafen
- Hans-Joachim Roedelius as Der kleine Bobby, Barbaras Söhnchen
- Stella Textor as Eine französische Flugpassagierin
- Theodor Thony as Ein französischer Flugpassagier
- Werner Finck
- Boris Alekin
- Ernst Behmer
- Josef Karma

== Bibliography ==
- Hake, Sabine. Popular Cinema of the Third Reich. University of Texas Press, 2001.
