= Happiness Is the Main Thing =

1941 film

Happiness is the Main Thing
- Directed by: Theo Lingen
- Written by: Jochen Huth; Walter Forster; Rudo Ritter
- Produced by: Ernst Rechenmacher; Heinz Rühmann
- Starring: Heinz Rühmann; Hertha Feiler; Ida Wüst; Hans Leibelt
- Cinematography: Oskar Schnirch
- Edited by: Hilde Grebner
- Music by: Werner Bochmann
- Production company: Bavaria Film
- Distributed by: Bavaria Film
- Release date: 3 April 1941
- Running time: 92 minutes
- Country: Germany
- Language: German

Happiness is the Main Thing (German: Hauptsache glücklich) is a 1941 German comedy film directed by Theo Lingen and starring Heinz Rühmann, Hertha Feiler and Ida Wüst. It was shot at the Bavaria Studios in Munich and the Hostivar Studios in Prague. The film's sets were designed by the art directors Rudolf Pfenninger and Ludwig Reiber. It premiered at the Gloria-Palast in Berlin.

== Synopsis ==
A poorly motivated employee gets married and becomes even lazier. His wife takes the initiative to change things for the better.

== Cast ==
- Heinz Rühmann as Axel Roth
- Hertha Feiler as Uschi Roth
- Ida Wüst as Frau Lind
- Hans Leibelt as Generaldirektor Arndt
- Arthur Wiesner as Standesbeamter
- Jane Tilden as Liselotte / Daisy
- Fritz Odemar as Generaldirektor Zimmermann
- Max Gülstorff as Bürovorsteher Binder
- Hilde Wagener as Frau Bertyn
- Arthur Schröder as Lawyer Mohrig
- Annemarie Holtz as Betty Arndt
- Karl Etlinger as Juwelier
- Ernst G. Schiffner as Steuerbeamter
- Hans Paetsch as Unverheiratetet Kollege
- Hilde Sessak
- Theo Shall
- Hans Zesch-Ballot

== Bibliography ==
- Hake, Sabine. Popular Cinema of the Third Reich. University of Texas Press, 2001.
