= Shock Troop (film) =

1934 film by Hans Zöberlein

Shock Troop (German title: Stoßtrupp 1917) is a 1934 German war film written and directed by Hans Zöberlein, and starring Ludwig Schmid-Wildy, Beppo Brem and Max Zankl. It tells the story of German stormtroopers surrounded by French forces during the Second Battle of the Aisne in the First World War and later fighting the British in Flanders and the Battle of Cambrai.

== Cast ==
- Ludwig Schmid-Wildy as Hans Steinbauer
- Beppo Brem as Girgl
- Toni Eggert as Toni
- Max Zankl as Heiner
- Hans Pössenbacher as Anderl
- Karl Hanft as Martl
- Heinz Evelt as Max
- Hans Erich Pfleger as Karl + Capitaine
- Georg Emmerling as Gustl
- Albert Penzkofer as Der Unteroffizier
- Ludwig Ten Cloot as Der Kompanieführer
- Hans Schaudinn as Der Feldwebel
- Hans Franz Pokorny as Der Major
- Harry Hertzsch as Der Leutnant
- Matthias Olschinsky as Der General
- Eberhard Kreysern as Der Stabsmajor
- Leopold Kerscher as Der Funker
- Peter Labertouche as Der Engländer
