= Crooks in Tails (1937 film) =

1937 film

- Directed by: Johannes Riemann
- Written by: Toni Huppertz; Friedrich Dammann; Johannes Riemann; Walter von Hollander
- Starring: Camilla Horn; Paul Klinger; Karl Martell
- Cinematography: Georg Bruckbauer
- Music by: Harald Böhmelt
- Production company: Itala-Film
- Distributed by: Tobis Film
- Release date: 26 August 1937
- Running time: 85 minutes
- Country: Germany
- Language: German

Crooks in Tails (German: Gauner im Frack) is a 1937 German film directed by Johannes Riemann and starring Camilla Horn, Paul Klinger and Karl Martell.

It was shot on location on the French Riviera.

== Cast ==
- Camilla Horn as Vera Dalmatoff
- Paul Klinger as Conny Parker
- Karl Martell as Fred Parker - Conny's Brother
- Charlott Daudert
- Karl Günther as Baron von Geldern aka Baroff
- Walter Steinbeck
- Erwin Biegel
- Eduard Wenck
- Eric Helgar
- Franz Arzdorf
- Josefine Dora
- Hugo Flink
- Ernst Rotmund
- Just Scheu
- F.W. Schröder-Schrom
- Liselotte Köster
- Jockel Stahl
- Alfred Heynisch
- Carl-Heinz Schroth

== Bibliography ==
- Waldman, Harry (2008). Nazi Films in America, 1933–1942. Jefferson, NC: McFarland. ISBN 978-0-7864-3861-7.
