= Deutsches Theater =

Deutsches Theater is the name of several theatres which were founded to promote German language and literature, oftentimes in the 19th century as counterparts to Italian operas:

- Deutsches Theater (Berlin)
- Deutsches Theater (Göttingen)
- Deutsches Theater (Hanover)
- Deutsches Theater (Munich)
- Deutsches Theater (Oslo)
- Deutsches Theater Pest

It's also the former name of the following theatres:

- Prague German Opera
- Hoogduitse Schouwburg, Amsterdam
