= Paul Dahlke (actor) =

German actor (1904–1984)

- Born: 12 April 1904; Gross Streitz, Province of Pomerania, Imperial Germany
- Died: 23 November 1984 (aged 80); Salzburg, Austria
- Occupation: Actor
- Years active: 1929–1984

Paul Victor Ernst Dahlke (12 April 1904 – 23 November 1984) was a German stage and film actor.

== Career ==
Dahlke was born in Gross Streitz (today Strzezenice, Poland) near Köslin in Farther Pomerania. He visited school in Köslin, Stargard and passed his Abitur in Dortmund in 1922. Dahlke started to study at the Bergakademie in Clausthal (now Clausthal University of Technology) and the Technische Hochschule in Charlottenburg (now Technische Universität Berlin) but also attended some lectures in German philology and dramatics.

In 1927, Dahlke was a scholar of Max Reinhardt's drama school and appeared at different stages in Berlin and Munich in 1929. He became a member of the Deutsches Theater ensemble in 1934 until its closedown in 1944. In 1937 he was awarded the highest recognition for an actor in Nazi Germany, the title Staatsschauspieler . Throughout the 1930s he worked with popular actors like Emil Jannings, Zarah Leander, Lil Dagover or Lída Baarová. Some of these projects, like The Traitor are considered obvious propaganda films.

After World War II Dahlke worked at the Staatsschauspiel Munich and embodied characters like Carl Zuckmayer's Des Teufels General or Professor Higgins in George Bernard Shaw's Pygmalion. He became popular by several TV productions in the 1970s, e.g. his appearance in The Old Fox, Derrick or Der Kommissar.

Dahlke was the German dubbing voice of Charles Laughton and Vincent Price.

Dahlke died in Salzburg and is buried at Grundlsee, Austria. He was married to the actress Elfe Gerhart.

== Filmography ==
- 1934: Love, Death and the Devil – The Governor
- 1935: Joan of Arc
- 1935: Lady Windermere's Fan – Bankier Brown
- 1936: The Traitor – Agent Geyer
- 1937: Fridericus – Field Marshal General von Dessau
- 1937: My Son the Minister – Vaccarés
- 1937: Patriots – Charles
- 1937: Daphne and the Diplomat – Dr. Kolbe
- 1937: The Broken Jug – Ruprecht Tümpel, sein Sohn
- 1938: Urlaub auf Ehrenwort – Direktor des Herrschaftshauses
- 1938: Schwarzfahrt ins Glück – Im- und Exporteur Carlo Sylvester
- 1938: Capriccio – Cesaire
- 1938: Covered Tracks – Henry Poquet – Boulevardschriftsteller
- 1938: Pour le Mérite – Herr Schnaase
- 1938: Women for Golden Hill – Barryman
- 1939: War es der im 3. Stock? – Heidenreich, Kriminalkommissar
- 1939: The Wedding Trip – Jean Jacques Bouffart, Private Detective
- 1939: Morgen werde ich verhaftet – Kriminalkommissar Brinkmann
- 1939: The Life and Loves of Tschaikovsky – Iwan Casarowitsch Glykow, Music publisher
- 1939: The Merciful Lie – Jean Goban
- 1939: Who's Kissing Madeleine? – Kommissar Watson
- 1939: Robert Koch – Lehrer
- 1939: Die unheimlichen Wünsche – Canais, Feodoras Lakai und Geliebter
- 1939: Kennwort Machin – Jürgen Borb, Kassierer der Dadag, alias A. Machin
- 1939: Liberated Hands – Thomsen
- 1940: The Girl from Barnhelm – Just
- 1940: Enemies -Fährmann
- 1940: Friedrich Schiller – The Triumph of a Genius – Class Sergeant Riess
- 1940: Die keusche Geliebte – Edgar Simon
- 1941: Riding for Germany – Dolinski
- 1941: Venus on Trial – Gottlieb Böller, Bürgermeister
- 1941: Comrades – Rappel, Bursche
- 1941: The Waitress Anna – Malwoda
- 1941: Heimaterde
- 1942: Andreas Schlüter – Erzgießer Jacobi
- 1942: Beloved World – Professor Strickbach
- 1942: Doctor Crippen – Defense lawyer
- 1942: Fünftausend Mark Belohnung – Kriminalkommissar Helling
- 1943: I Entrust My Wife to You – Boxer Alois
- 1943: Romance in a Minor Key – Madeleine's husband
- 1943: Gefährlicher Frühling – Albert Ludwig Babian, Schuldirektor
- 1944: Seine beste Rolle – Diener Sebastian
- 1944: I Need You – Direktor Heinrich Scholz
- 1944: Der Täter ist unter uns – Kriminalrat a.D. Adrian
- 1944: That Was My Life – Dr. Berner
- 1944: Orient Express – Police Commisar Iwanowitsch
- 1945: A Man Like Maximilian – Theaterdirektor Rother
- 1945: Das Gesetz der Liebe – Leutnant von Gorschewski
- 1947: And If We Should Meet Again – Studienrat Bockendahl
- 1948: Menschen in Gottes Hand – Vater Renken
- 1948: The Lost Face – Axel Witt
- 1948: The Original Sin
- 1948: The Time with You – Die Zeit mit dir
- 1948: Insolent and in Love – Hennemann, Diener und Chauffeur
- 1949: Long Is the Road – 2nd Doctor
- 1949: Dreimal Komödie – Philipp Geiger
- 1949: Trouble Backstairs – August Krüger
- 1949: Encounter with Werther – Napoleon
- 1949: Der Posaunist – Robert
- 1949: The Trip to Marrakesh – Henry Orliac
- 1949: The Prisoner – Emil Karge, 2. Posaunist
- 1949: Das Gesetz der Liebe – Leutnant von Gorschewski
- 1950: Kein Engel ist so rein – Fritz
- 1950: The Shadow of Herr Monitor – Thomas Gossip
- 1950: The Rabanser Case – Dr. Georg Rabanser
- 1950: The Disturbed Wedding Night – Hammok, Diener
- 1950: The Falling Star – Viktor Hollreiser
- 1951: One Night's Intoxication – Generaldirektor Siebel
- 1951: Falschmünzer am Werk – Inspektor Paillard
- 1952: Weekend in Paradise – Regierungsrat Dittjen
- 1952: The Day Before the Wedding – Bürgermeister
- 1952: Shooting Stars – Gerhard Sommer
- 1953: Don't Forget Love – Dr. Franz Kienzel
- 1953: Arlette Conquers Paris – Justizminister
- 1953: Once I Will Return – John Rick
- 1954: The Great Lola – Emil Dornwald
- 1954: Clivia – Potterton
- 1954: Love is Forever – Mr. Vogelreuther
- 1954: The Flying Classroom – Justus
- 1954: Three from Variety
- 1955: Three Men in the Snow – Geheimrat Eduard Schlüter
- 1955: Her First Date – Martin, Literaturprofessor
- 1955: Request Concert – Direktor Knoll
- 1955: My Children and I – Otto Baumann
- 1955: Roman einer Siebzehnjährigen – Karl Hoffmann
- 1956: Fruit Without Love – Prof. Schillinger
- 1956: Die Ehe des Dr. med. Danwitz – Fritz Hambach – Fabrikant
- 1956: The First Day of Spring – Robert Hiller
- 1956: Kitty and the Great Big World – Henry Dupont
- 1957: Stresemann – Reich-President Friedrich Ebert
- 1957: Made in Germany – Werkmeister Löber
- 1957: Confessions of Felix Krull – Professor Kuckuck
- 1957: Liebe, wie die Frau sie wünscht – Professor Liborius
- 1957: Different from You and Me – Bankdirektor Werner Teichmann
- 1957: Heute blau und morgen blau – Stadtrat Hugo Bunzel
- 1958: All the Sins of the Earth – Dr. Volkert
- 1959: Dubrowsky – Dubrowski
- 1959: The Scarlet Baroness – Oberst Urbaneck
- 1959: Moonwolf – Ara's father
- 1959: The Head – Police Commissioner Sturm
- 1959: Liebe, Luft und lauter Lügen – Vater Rössle
- 1959: Love Now, Pay Later – Herr Reimer, Mieter
- 1959: Abschied von den Wolken – Dr. Quartz
- 1959: Triplets on Board – Emilio
- 1960: Ein Student ging vorbei – Apotheker Brandt
- 1961: Jedermann – Mammon
- 1961: Sansibar (TV Movie) – Herr Knudsen
- 1962: Das Mädchen und der Staatsanwalt – Vorsitzender
- 1962: Deutschland – deine Sternchen – Dr. Berger
- 1963: The Black Cobra – Dr.Langhammer, Kommissar
- 1963: With Best Regards – Generaldirektor Brock
- 1963: The House in Montevideo – Pastor Riesling
- 1964: Encounter in Salzburg – Insurance Director
- 1964: The Secret of the Chinese Carnation – Reginald Sheridan
- 1965: Red Dragon – Harris
- 1965: Situation Hopeless... But Not Serious – Herr Neusel
- 1967: The Heathens of Kummerow – Pastor Breithaupt
- 1969: Donnerwetter! Donnerwetter! Bonifatius Kiesewetter – Amtsgerichtsrat Kiesewetter
- 1970: Heintje – Einmal wird die Sonne wieder scheinen – Friedrich Wilhelm Berthold
- 1973: Oh Jonathan – oh Jonathan! – Dr. Paul Heizer
- 1974: The Moonstone (TV film) – Gabriel Betteredge
- 1975: Die Stadt im Tal (TV Mini-Series) – Graf Bosch
- 1978: MS Franziska (TV Series) – Jakob Wilde
- 1978: Алмазная тропа (Diamantenpfade) – Prof. Otto von Heyden
- 1983: Derrick (TV Series, Season 10, Episode 2: "Die Tote in der Isar") – Josef Matusek

== Awards ==
- 1937: Staatsschauspieler
- 1966: Culture Award of the Pomeranian Landsmannschaft
- 1974: Filmband in Gold
- 1979: Commander's Cross of the Order of Merit of the Federal Republic of Germany
