= Arthur Wiesner =

German actor and voice actor (1895–1980)

- Born: 17 January 1895; Schweidnitz, German Empire
- Died: 7 March 1980 (aged 85); West Berlin, West Germany
- Occupation: Actor
- Years active: 1937–1953 (film)

Arthur Wiesner (1895–1980) was a German stage and film actor. He appeared in twenty eight films and television series.

== Filmography ==
Year	Title	Role	Notes
1937	Unternehmen Michael	Brieftaubenwärter	
1941	Happiness is the Main Thing	Standesbeamter	
1942	His Son	Standesbeamter	
1942	The Big Game	Franzko	
1942	Beloved World		
1943	Paracelsus	Horse doctor	
1943	Tonelli	Der beisitzende Richter, der Majas Brief vorliest	
1943	Journey into the Past	Der Gastwirt	
1944	In flagranti		
1944	Es fing so harmlos an	Hoteldiener	
1945	Bravo, Little Thomas	Briefträger	
1948	Street Acquaintances	Erikas Vater	
1948	Unser Mittwochabend	Felix	
1948	Insolent and in Love	Gepäckträger	
1949	Night of the Twelve		
1950	Bürgermeister Anna	Vater Ucker	
1950	The Council of the Gods	Vater Scholz	
1950	The Benthin Family		
1952	Karriere in Paris	Christoph	
1953	Love's Awakening	Arzt	
1954	Canaris	Radtke - Techniker	
1957	Rose Bernd	Vater Bernd	
1958	Iron Gustav	Amtsgerichtsrat	

== Bibliography ==
- Giesen, Rolf. Nazi Propaganda Films: A History and Filmography. McFarland & Company, 2003.
