= Don't Talk to Me About Love (film) =

1943 film directed by Erich Engel

- Directed by: Erich Engel
- Written by: Curt J. Braun
- Based on: Don't Talk to Me About Love by Hugo Maria Kritz
- Produced by: Fred Lyssa
- Starring: Heidemarie Hatheyer; Mathias Wieman; Hilde Sessak
- Cinematography: Igor Oberberg
- Edited by: Lena Neumann
- Music by: Leo Leux
- Production company: Bavaria Film
- Distributed by: Deutsche Filmvertriebs
- Release date: 17 September 1943
- Running time: 92 minutes
- Country: Germany
- Language: German

Don't Talk to Me About Love (German: Man rede mir nicht von Liebe) is a 1943 German romantic drama film directed by Erich Engel and starring Heidemarie Hatheyer, Mathias Wieman and Hilde Sessak. It was shot at the Bavaria Studios in Munich and the Hostivar Studios in Prague with location shooting around Zugspitze in the Bavarian Alps. The film's sets were designed by the art directors Max Seefelder and Hans Sohnle.

== Synopsis ==
Pamela, an aspiring young painter moves to Munich in order to pursue her ambitions. There she encounters the more experienced artist Andreas who takes her under his wing. However her fiercely ambitious nature leads her to taking on a large commission to paint a mural for a bank that she is not yet read for, leading to a dispute between them.

== Cast ==
- Heidemarie Hatheyer as Pamela Keith
- Mathias Wieman as Andreas Alwin
- Friedrich Domin as Van Italy
- Hilde Sessak as Marzella
- Willem Holsboer as Pantscho-Drexler
- Viktor Afritsch as Marcel Brügge
- Margarete Haagen as Frau Labarre
- Walther Jung as Herr Labarre
- Rolf Weih as Kurt Labarre
- Elise Aulinger as Rosi Machatschek
- Liesl Karlstadt as Fritzi Machatschek
- Erhard Siedel as Kunsthändler Friedrich

== Bibliography ==
- Goble, Alan. The Complete Index to Literary Sources in Film. Walter de Gruyter, 1999.
- Klaus, Ulrich J. Deutsche Tonfilme: Jahrgang 1943. Klaus-Archiv, 1988.
- Rentschler, Eric. The Ministry of Illusion: Nazi Cinema and Its Afterlife. Harvard University Press, 1996.
