= Ball at the Metropol =

1937 film directed by Frank Wisbar

- Directed by: Frank Wisbar
- Written by: Wolf Neumeister; Ilse M. Spath; Frank Wisbar
- Based on: Irrungen, Wirrungen by Theodor Fontane
- Produced by: Fred Lyssa
- Starring: Heinrich George; Heinz von Cleve; Hilde Weissner
- Cinematography: Erich Claunigk
- Edited by: Lena Neumann
- Music by: Walter Kollo
- Production company: Neucophon Tonfilm-Produktion
- Distributed by: Terra Film
- Release date: 26 January 1937
- Running time: 84 minutes
- Country: Germany
- Language: German

Ball at the Metropol (German: Ball im Metropol) is a 1937 German drama film directed by Frank Wisbar and starring Heinrich George, Heinz von Cleve and Hilde Weissner. The film's sets were designed by the art directors Fritz Maurischat and Anton Weber. It was based on the 1888 novel Irrungen, Wirrungen by Theodor Fontane. It premiered at the Gloria-Palast in Berlin.

== Cast ==
- Heinrich George as Rudolf von Waltzien
- Heinz von Cleve as Eberhard von Waltzien
- Hilde Weissner as Margit Steltendorff
- Viktoria von Ballasko as Gertrude Selle
- Elsa Wagner as Frau Selle
- Ursula Weißbach as Lotte Schultze
- Katja Specht as Eva Kreßt
- Franz Schafheitlin as Steltendorff
- Fred Goebel as Studerke
- Leopold von Ledebur as Graf Kreßt
- Heinz Klockow as von Restrow
- S.O. Schoening as von Prißwitz
- Bob Bauer as von Puttkammer
- Frau Finkelnburg as Baronin Malchin
- Fanny Cotta as Direktrice des Modehauses
- William Huch as Diener bei Baron von Waltzien
- Fred Köster as Gast beim Ball im Metropol
- Karl Platen as Werner, Diener
- Achim von Biel as Gesandter
- Margitta Zonewa as Sängerin

== Bibliography ==
- Goble, Alan. The Complete Index to Literary Sources in Film. Walter de Gruyter, 1999.
- Nicolella, Henry. Frank Wisbar: The Director of Ferryman Maria, from Germany to America and Back. McFarland, 2018.
- Winkel, Roel Vande & Welch, David. Cinema and the Swastika: The International Expansion of Third Reich Cinema. Palgrave MacMillan, 2011.
