= Bravo, Little Thomas =

1945 film

- Directed by: Jan Fethke
- Written by: Odo Krohmann
- Produced by: Fred Lyssa
- Starring: Rudolf Reiff; Elise Aulinger; Fritz Wagner
- Cinematography: Václav Hanuš
- Edited by: Lena Neumann
- Music by: Oskar Wagner
- Production company: Bavaria Film
- Distributed by: Deutsche Filmvertriebs
- Release date: 28 February 1945
- Running time: 70 minutes
- Country: Germany
- Language: German

Bravo, Little Thomas (German: Bravo, kleiner Thomas) is a 1945 German family drama film directed by Jan Fethke and starring Rudolf Reiff, Elise Aulinger and Fritz Wagner. It was shot at the Hostivar Studios in German-occupied Prague and on location around the city. The film's sets were designed by the art director Heinrich Weidemann.

== Cast ==
- Rudolf Reiff as Bäckermeister Knoll
- Elise Aulinger as Frau Rennert, Thomas' Mutter
- Fritz Wagner as Wilhelm Rennert, ältester Sohn
- Katja Nyborg as Susanne, ein junges Mädchen
- Walther Jung as Paulsen, Großgärtnereibesitzer
- Eva Wagner as Monika Paulsen, Tochter
- Hans Töller as Thomas Rennert
- Hans Jürgen Stöcker as Heiner
- Hilde Berndt as Kindermädchen
- Reiner Brönneke
- Josef Dunker
- Ernst G. Schiffner as Karussellbesitzer
- Arthur Wiesner as Briefträger

== Bibliography ==
- Klaus, Ulrich J. Deutsche Tonfilme: Jahrgang 1945. Klaus-Archiv, 1988.
- Skopal, Pavel & Winkel, Roel Vande. (ed.) Film Professionals in Nazi-Occupied Europe: Mediation Between the National-Socialist Cultural 'New Order' and Local Structures. Springer International Publishing, 2021.
