= Romance in a Minor Key =

1943 film by Helmut Käutner

- German film poster
- German: Romanze in Moll
- Directed by: Helmut Käutner
- Written by: Willy Clever; Helmut Käutner; Guy de Maupassant (story)
- Produced by: Hermann Grund
- Starring: Marianne Hoppe; Paul Dahlke; Ferdinand Marian
- Cinematography: Georg Bruckbauer
- Edited by: Anneliese Sponholz
- Music by: Lothar Brühne; Werner Eisbrenner
- Production company: Tobis Film
- Distributed by: Deutsche Filmvertriebs
- Release date: 25 June 1943
- Running time: 98 minutes
- Country: Germany
- Language: German

Romance in a Minor Key (German: Romanze in Moll) is a 1943 German historical drama film directed by Helmut Käutner and starring Marianne Hoppe, Paul Dahlke, and Ferdinand Marian. It was shot at the Johannisthal Studios in Berlin. The film's sets were designed by the art directors Otto Erdmann and Franz F. Fürst.

== Cast ==
- Marianne Hoppe as Madeleine
- Paul Dahlke as Madeleine's husband
- Ferdinand Marian as Michael
- Siegfried Breuer as Viktor
- Elisabeth Flickenschildt as doorkeeper's wife
- Karl Günther as jeweler
- Eric Helgar as Michael's brother
- Karl Platen as Michael's servant
- Anja Elkoff as singer
- Walter Lieck as tall man
- Ernst Legal as Hard-of-hearing man
- Hans Stiebner as fat man
- Hugo Flink as banker
- Klaus Pohl as Pawnbroker
- Leo Peukert as Cafe proprietor
- Maria Loja as Wife of cafe proprietor
- Ethel Reschke as Streetwalker
- Karl Etlinger as branch director
- Ernst Rotmund as police commissar
- Walter Bechmann as Head waiter
- Hans Parge as Shoe salesman
- Hansi Schuendler as Shoe saleswoman
- Rudolf Kalvius as Physician
- Herbert Weissbach as elder musical director
- Egon Vogel as florist
- Hanns Waschatko as head of consistory
- Helmut Käutner as poet
- Karl Junge-Swinburne
- Hermann Noack
- Elisabeth von Ruets
