= Karl Hanft =

Austrian actor

- Born: 25 July 1904; Vienna, Austria-Hungary
- Died: 2 February 1982 (aged 77); Munich, Bavaria, West Germany
- Occupation: Film actor
- Years active: 1931–1974

Karl Hanft (25 July 1904 – 2 February 1982) was an Austrian film actor.

== Selected filmography ==
- Shock Troop (1934)
- Enemies (1940)
- Secret File W.B.1 (1942)
- The Endless Road (1943)
- Tonelli (1943)
- Orient Express (1944)
- Hubertus Castle (1954)
- Salzburg Stories (1957)
- The Beautiful Adventure (1959)
- The Haunted Castle (1960)
