= Twilight (1940 film) =

1940 film

- Directed by: Rudolf van der Noss
- Written by: Arthur Pohl
- Produced by: Richard Riedel
- Starring: Viktor Staal; Ruth Hellberg; Carl Raddatz
- Cinematography: Hugo von Kaweczynski
- Edited by: Else Baum
- Music by: Kurt Schröder
- Production company: UFA
- Distributed by: UFA
- Release date: 19 April 1940
- Running time: 85 minutes
- Country: Germany
- Language: German

Twilight (German: Zwielicht) is a 1940 German drama film directed by Rudolf van der Noss and starring Viktor Staal, Ruth Hellberg and Carl Raddatz. The film's art direction was by Hermann Asmus and Carl Ludwig Kirmse.

== Cast ==
- Viktor Staal as Walter Gruber
- Ruth Hellberg as Grete Kuhnert
- Carl Raddatz as Robert Thiele
- Ursula Grabley as Renate Gutzeit
- Fritz Genschow as Forstmeister Jürgens
- Paul Wegener as Förster Kuhnert
- Hans Stiebner as Schankwirt Gutzeit
- Wilhelm König as Alfred Gruber
- Willi Rose as Kriminalassistent Sievers
- Wilhelm Althaus as Kriminalrat Malzahn
- Gerhard Dammann as Dornkaat
- Erich Dunskus as Gendarmeriewachtmeister Weber
- Albert Lippert as Kriminalkommissar Hagenbach
- Ernst Rotmund as Zirkusdirektor Mansfeld
- Kate Kühl as Emilie
- Walter Lieck as Schulze
- Lotte Rausch as Amanda
- Willi Schur as Köppke
- Paul Westermeier as Paul Borchert
- Otto Matthies
- Bob Bolander
- Otto Braml
- Kurt Cramer
- Kurt Dreml
- Erich Haußmann
- Paul Hildebrandt
- Fritz Hube
- Hellmuth Passarge
- Arthur Reinhardt
- Rudolf Renfer
- Walter Schenk
- Herbert Schimkat
- Willy Stettner
- Hermann Stetza

== Bibliography ==
- Bock, Hans-Michael; Bergfelder, Tim, eds. (2009). The Concise Cinegraph: Encyclopaedia of German Cinema. New York: Berghahn Books. ISBN 978-1-57181-655-9.
