= Andreas Schlüter (film) =

1942 historical drama film

- Directed by: Herbert Maisch
- Written by: Helmut Brandis; Herbert Maisch
- Based on: Der Münzturm by Alfons von Czibulka
- Produced by: Viktor von Struwe
- Starring: Heinrich George; Mila Kopp; Olga Chekhova
- Cinematography: Ewald Daub
- Edited by: Ursula Schmidt
- Music by: Wolfgang Zeller
- Production company: Terra Film
- Distributed by: Deutsche Filmvertriebs
- Release date: 11 September 1942
- Running time: 111 minutes
- Country: Germany
- Language: German

Andreas Schlüter is a 1942 German historical drama film directed by Herbert Maisch and starring Heinrich George, Mila Kopp and Olga Chekhova. It portrays the life of the 18th-century German architect Andreas Schlüter. It was shot at the Babelsberg Studios and Althoff Studios in Berlin. The film's sets were designed by the art directors Hermann Asmus, Kurt Herlth and Robert Herlth.

== Cast ==
- Heinrich George as Andreas Schlüter
- Mila Kopp as Elisabeth Schlüter
- Olga Chekhova as Countess Vera Orlewska
- Theodor Loos as Prince Friedrich III.
- Dorothea Wieck as Princess Charlotte
- Marianne Simson as Leonore Schlüter
- Karl John as Bildhauer Martin Böhme, ihr Bräutigam
- Herbert Hübner as Minister Johann von Wartenberg
- Ernst Fritz Fürbringer as Johann Friedrich Eosander von Göthe
- Eduard von Winterstein as Naumann, ein Freund Schlüters
- Emil Heß as Counsellor Dankelmann
- Max Gülstorff as Geheimrat Kraut
- Robert Taube as Gottfried Wilhelm Leibniz
- Paul Dahlke as Ore Caster Johann Jacobi
- Christian Kayßler as Prince von Anhalt-Dessau
- Trude Haefelin as Mrs. von Pöllnitz
- Franz Schafheitlin as Mr. von Harms
- Otto Graf as Count Flemming
- Ernst Legal as Professor Sturm
- Paul Westermeier as Gießmeister Wenzel
- Ernst Rotmund as Grünberg
- Karl Hannemann as Dietze
- Peter Elsholtz as Der Agitator
- Hans Meyer-Hanno as Der Bauführer
- Helmut Heyne as Der Zeichner
- Carl Günther as Der Rittmeister
- Herwart Grosse as Sekretär bei Wartenberg
- Valy Arnheim as Zeremonienmeister
- Hans Waschatko as Obermarschall
- Klaus Pohl as Ein Kommissionsmitglied

== Bibliography ==
- Aldgate, Anthony; Richards, Jeffrey (2007). Britain Can Take It: The British Cinema in the Second World War. London: I.B. Tauris. ISBN 978-1-84511-445-9.
