= Alarm (1941 film) =

1941 German crime film

- Directed by: Herbert B. Fredersdorf
- Written by: Kurt Roecken (novel); Kurt E. Walter
- Produced by: Gustav Althoff
- Starring: Karl Martell; Maria von Tasnady; Paul Klinger
- Cinematography: Eduard Hoesch
- Edited by: Margarete Steinborn
- Music by: Hanson Milde-Meissner
- Production company: Aco-Film
- Release date: 31 January 1941
- Running time: 91 minutes
- Country: Germany
- Language: German

Alarm is a 1941 German crime film directed by Herbert B. Fredersdorf and starring Karl Martell, Maria von Tasnady and Paul Klinger. The production was made by the independent Aco-Film rather than one of Germany's major film companies. It was shot at the Althoff Studios and various locations around Berlin including Tempelhof Airport and the Karstadt Department Store. The film's sets were designed by the art director Bruno Lutz.

== Cast ==
- Karl Martell as Kriminalkommissar Petersen
- Maria von Tasnady as Sekretärin Vera Kaufmann
- Paul Klinger as Herbert Flügger
- Rolf Weih as Werkpilot Werner Blennemann
- Hilde Sessak as Platzanweiserin Helene Hoesch
- Hilde Hildebrand as Pensionsinhaberin Frau Anders
- Lotte Rausch as Dienstmädchen Meta
- Theodor Loos as Rentner Ophagen
- Fritz Rasp as Feinmechaniker Stülken
- Alexander Engel as Barpianist Ölkers
- Gerhard Bienert as Kriminalkommissar Dr. Dittmann
- Albert Venohr as Kriminaloberassistent Schneider
- Rudolf Platte as Ganove Schielauge
- Eduard Bornträger as Kneipenwirt
- Peter Elsholtz as Warenhausdetektiv
- Erwin Klietsch as Kriminalassistent
- Alfred Maack as Dr. Kugler
- Paul Rehkopf as Ganove Gustav
- Volker Soetbeer as Ganove Willy
- Wolfgang Dohnberg as Ganove
- Robert Vincenti-Lieffertz as Ganove
- F.W. Schröder-Schrom as Kinodirektor
- Rudolf Schündler as Produzent des Werbefilms
- Ewald Wenck as Buchhalter
- Reinhold Bernt as Wirt im Lokal
- Fritz Draeger as Fotograf der Mordkommission

== Bibliography ==
- Davidson, John; Hake, Sabine (2009). Framing the Fifties: Cinema in a Divided Germany. New York: Berghahn Books. ISBN 978-1-84545-536-1.
