= Strzeżenice =

- Village
- Location within Poland
- Coordinates: 54°14′1″N 16°3′8″E
- Country: Poland
- Voivodeship: West Pomeranian
- County: Koszalin
- Gmina: Będzino

Strzeżenice [stʂɛʐɛˈnit͡sɛ] (German: Gross Streitz) is a village in the administrative district of Gmina Będzino, within Koszalin County, West Pomeranian Voivodeship, in north-western Poland. It lies approximately 5 km (3 mi) north-east of Będzino, 11 km (7 mi) north-west of Koszalin, and 133 km (83 mi) north-east of the regional capital Szczecin.

== Notable residents ==
- Paul Dahlke (1904-1984), German actor
