= Fred Lyssa =

German film producer (1883–1950)

- Born: 26 August 1883; Berlin, German Empire
- Died: 17 October 1950 (aged 67); Grünwald, Bavaria, West Germany
- Occupation: Producer
- Years active: 1923-1950 (film)

Fred Lyssa (1883–1950) was a German film producer and production manager.

== Selected filmography ==
- D III 88 (1928)
- The Devious Path (1928)
- A Girl with Temperament (1928)
- The Night of Terror (1929)
- The Hound of the Baskervilles (1929)
- The Dancer of Sanssouci (1932)
- Pillars of Society (1935)
- Stjenka Rasin (1936)
- Ball at the Metropol (1937)
- The Holm Murder Case (1938)
- The Girl with a Good Reputation (1938)
- Shadows Over St. Pauli (1938)
- A Gust of Wind (1942)
- Don't Talk to Me About Love (1943)
- Paracelsus (1943)
- Bravo, Little Thomas (1945)
- A Man Like Maximilian (1945)
- The Millionaire (1947)

== Bibliography ==
- Nicolella, Henry. Frank Wisbar: The Director of Ferryman Maria, from Germany to America and Back. McFarland, 2018.
