= Martin Urtel =

German actor

- Born: 25 August 1914; Berlin, German Empire
- Died: 16 January 1989 (aged 74); Sommerhausen, Bavaria, West Germany
- Other name: Peter Martin Urtel
- Occupation: Actor
- Years active: 1941-1981 (film)

Peter Martin Urtel (1914 – 1989), frequently credited as just Martin Urtel, was a German film, stage and television actor. He played prominent roles in several German films of the Nazi era such as Comrades (1941) and Pabst's Paracelsus (1943).

== Selected filmography ==
- Comrades (1941)
- Venus on Trial (1941)
- Between Heaven and Earth (1942)
- Fünftausend Mark Belohnung (1942)
- Paracelsus (1943)
- Moselfahrt mit Monika (1944)
- Nights on the Road (1952)
- The Last Ride to Santa Cruz (1953)
- The Last Man (1955)
- Trompeten der Liebe (1962)
- Deep End (1970)
- Bluebeard (1972)
- Circle of Deceit (1981)

== Bibliography ==
- Klossner, Michael. The Europe of 1500-1815 on Film and Television: A Worldwide Filmography of Over 2550 Works, 1895 Through 2000. McFarland, 2002.
- Rentschler, Eric. The Films of G.W. Pabst: An Extraterritorial Cinema. Rutgers University Press, 1990.
