= Police Report (1939 film) =

1939 film

- Directed by: Rudolf van der Noss
- Written by: Axel Rudolf (novel); Hanns Marschall; Georg Zoch
- Produced by: Viktor von Struwe
- Starring: Lola Müthel; Hans Zesch-Ballot; Erich Fiedler
- Cinematography: Carl Drews
- Edited by: Anna Höllering
- Music by: Wolfgang Zeller
- Production company: Terra Film
- Distributed by: Terra Film
- Release date: 25 July 1939
- Running time: 84 minutes
- Country: Germany
- Language: German

Police Report (German: Der Polizeifunk meldet) is a 1939 German crime thriller film directed by Rudolf van der Noss and starring Lola Müthel, Hans Zesch-Ballot and Erich Fiedler. It was shot at the Babelsberg Studios in Berlin. The film's sets were designed by the art directors Heinrich Beisenherz and Alfred Bütow. It was produced and distributed by Terra Film.

== Synopsis ==
Two men attempting industrial espionage on a new chemical invention become caught up in a murder case for which they have no alibi.

== Cast ==
- Lola Müthel as Inge Flint, Cheflaborantin
- Hans Zesch-Ballot as Benken, Kriminalkommissar
- Erich Fiedler as Erich Wiesneck
- Jaspar von Oertzen as Dr. Berthold Mahr
- Albert Lippert as Harry Hornemann, Kaufmann
- Hans Stiebner as Tesch, Penionsinhaber
- Herbert Gernot as Berg, Kriminalsekretär
- Roma Bahn as Frau Duval, Modehausbesitzerin
- Elsa Wagner as Frau Kapland, Vermieterin
- Lotte Rausch as Grete, Dienstmädchen
- Jack Trevor as Percy Duffins
- Werner Pledath as Dieffenbach, Kriminalrat
- F.W. Schröder-Schrom as Mahr, Kommerzienrat
- Bruno Fritz as Müller, Kriminalsekretär
- Otto Matthies as Hebert Timm / Faber / Ganove

== Bibliography ==
- Giesen, Rolf. The Nosferatu Story: The Seminal Horror Film, Its Predecessors and Its Enduring Legacy. McFarland, 2019.
- Klaus, Ulrich J. Deutsche Tonfilme: Jahrgang 1939. Klaus-Archiv, 1988.
- Rentschler, Eric. The Ministry of Illusion: Nazi Cinema and Its Afterlife. Harvard University Press, 1996.
