= Karl Hermann Martell =

German actor

Karl Hermann Martell (November 17, 1906 in Tilsit – December 28, 1966 in Hamburg) was a German actor.

Martell was only 14 when he had his first performance in a silent movie, Das große Geheimnis (1920). In subsequent years, he was often seen as a supporting actor. In the 1930s, he reached main billing in romance and adventure films and acted as a partner of Zarah Leander in four movies. During World War II he participated in Alarm, Ohm Krüger, Back Then and Das alte Lied.

After the Second World War, in the 1950s, Martell tried to resume his movie career, but he was given mainly B-movie roles. He also produced documentaries. In his last film, The Blue Moth (1959), he again appeared with Zarah Leander, albeit in a minor role.

== Filmography ==
- 1920: Das grosse Geheimnis
- 1921: The Golden Plague
- 1922: Das goldene Haar
- 1936: Der Zweck heiligt die Mittel
- 1937: Dangerous Game
- 1937: Crooks in Tails
- 1937: Premiere
- 1937: La Habanera
- 1938: The Gambler
- 1938: Women for Golden Hill
- 1939: D III 88
- 1939: Dein Leben gehört mir
- 1939: New Year's Eve on Alexanderplatz
- 1939: Die Geliebte
- 1941: Alarm
- 1941: Ohm Krüger
- 1942: With the Eyes of a Woman
- 1943: Laugh, Pagliacci
- 1943: Laugh Bajazzo
- 1943: Back Then
- 1945: Das alte Lied
- 1945: Zwischen Herz und Gewissen
- 1945: Das fremde Leben
- 1951: Herzen im Sturm
- 1951: Mathematik der Schönheit (director)
- 1953: Seenot...---...SOS (director)
- 1953: Stars Over Colombo
- 1954: The Prisoner of the Maharaja
- 1959: The Blue Moth
