= Rudolf Reiff =

German actor

- Born: November 9, 1901; Leipzig, German Empire
- Died: April 1961 (aged 59); Germany

Rudolf Reiff (1901–1961) was a German stage and film actor.

== Filmography ==
Year	Title	Role	Notes
1943	Tonelli	Der Gerichtsvorsitzende	
1944	Romantische Brautfahrt	Baron Feldern	
1945	Bravo, Little Thomas	Bäckermeister Knoll	
1945	Freunde	Hubert	
1948	Insolent and in Love	Besitzer des Landhotels	
1949	Schuld allein ist der Wein	Clemens Hennemann - Ortsvorsteher und Gastwirt	
1949	The Great Mandarin		
1949	Encounter with Werther	Amtmann - Lotte's Father	
1949	Verspieltes Leben		Uncredited
1949	Das Gesetz der Liebe		
1950	Doctor Praetorius	Prof. Klotz	
1950	Two in One Suit	Nick Turner	
1950	Trouble in Paradise	Hannibal Möller	
1951	Immortal Light	Perrin	
1951	Das späte Mädchen	Otto Matthes	
1951	The House in Montevideo	Bürgermeister	
1952	The Exchange		
1952	The Great Temptation	Generaldirektor Witt	
1953	The Chaplain of San Lorenzo		
1953	Music by Night	Dr. Reissner, Verleger	
1953	The Bird Seller	Oberförster	
1953	Heartbroken on the Moselle	Küfermeister Kuby	
1954	The Sun of St. Moritz		
1954	Morgengrauen		
1955	I Know What I'm Living For		
1956	Die Heinzelmännchen		Uncredited
