= Sky Hounds =

1942 film

- Directed by: Roger von Norman
- Written by: Hans Fischer-Gerhold; Hans Heise; Philipp Lothar Mayring
- Produced by: Eduard Kubat
- Starring: Malte Jaeger; Waldemar Leitgeb; Albert Florath
- Cinematography: Herbert Körner
- Edited by: Ira Oberberg
- Music by: Werner Bochmann; Wolfgang Zeller
- Production company: Terra Film
- Distributed by: Deutsche Filmvertriebs
- Release date: 20 February 1942
- Running time: 76 minutes
- Country: Germany
- Language: German

Sky Hounds (German: Himmelhunde) is a 1942 German war drama film directed by Roger von Norman and starring Malte Jaeger, Waldemar Leitgeb and Albert Florath.

The film's sets were designed by the art director Hermann Asmus. It was made at Babelsberg Studios with location shooting taking place at the Hornberg airfield.

== Synopsis ==
The film portrays Hitler Youth learning to build and fly gliders in preparation for their joining the Luftwaffe when they are older.

== Cast ==
- Malte Jaeger as Obertruppführer Kilian
- Waldemar Leitgeb as Standartenführer Hauff
- Albert Florath as Werkmeister Grundler
- Lutz Götz as Truppführer Schäfer
- Josef Kamper as Sturmführer Wagner
- Toni von Bukovics as Frau Grundler
- Klaus Pohl as Lagerkoch
- Erik Schumann as Werner Gundler, Himmelshund
- Volkmar Geiszer as Paul, Himmelshund
- Hermann Pack as Schulze, Himmelshund
- Horst Neutze as Petersen, Himmelshund
- Bernhard Schramm as Isemann, Himmelshund
- Hermann Dodel as Nägele, Himmelshund
- Harald Zusanek as Bannführer Friedrich
- Georg Vogelsang
- Erna Heidersdorf
- Edgar Hollot
- Siegmar Schneider
- Rudolf Vones

== Bibliography ==
- Richards, Jeffrey (1973). Visions of Yesterday. Routledge & K. Paul. ISBN 978-0-7100-7576-5.
