= The Last Man (1955 film) =

1955 film

- Directed by: Harald Braun
- Written by: George Hurdalek; Herbert Witt
- Produced by: Georg Richter
- Starring: Hans Albers; Romy Schneider; Rudolf Forster; Joachim Fuchsberger
- Cinematography: Richard Angst
- Edited by: Hilwa von Boro
- Music by: Werner Eisbrenner
- Production company: Neue Deutsche Filmgesellschaft
- Distributed by: Schorcht Filmverleih (W.Germany); Sascha Film (Austria)
- Release date: 14 October 1955
- Running time: 105 minutes
- Country: West Germany
- Language: German

The Last Man (German: Der letzte Mann) is a 1955 West German drama film directed by Harald Braun and starring Hans Albers, Romy Schneider and Rudolf Forster. The film is a remake of the 1924 Weimar silent The Last Laugh, with the setting updated to post-war Germany.

It was shot at the Bavaria Studios in Munich and on location in Baden-Baden. The film's sets were designed by the art director Kurt Herlth and Robert Herlth.

== Plot ==
A hotel employee loses his sense of self-respect when he is demoted.

== Cast ==
- Hans Albers as Karl Knesebeck
- Romy Schneider as Niddy Hoevelmann
- Rudolf Forster as Herr Claasen
- Joachim Fuchsberger as Alwin Radspieler
- Camilla Spira as Sabine Hoevelmann
- Michael Heltau as Helmuth Buehler
- Michael Gebühr as Till / Pikkolo
- Heini Göbel as Onkel Max
- Walter Gross as Kellner Otto
- Peter Lühr as Onkel Udo
- Willy Stettner as Friseur Popp
- Milena von Eckhardt as Kellner Eugen
- Sabine Hahn
- Ursula von Reibnitz as Tante Alma
- Charlotte Witthauer as Tante Elsbeth
- Paul Bahlke as Kellner Enrico
- Franz Essel as Empfangschef Pichler
- Heinrich Hauser as Der alte Krüger
- Peter Horn
- Karl-Maria Schley as Kellner Eugen
- Gert Westphal
- Karl-Georg Saebisch as Jonas, der Kellner
- Martin Urtel

== Bibliography ==
- Hake, Sabine (2001). Popular Cinema of the Third Reich. University of Texas Press. ISBN 978-0-292-73458-6 – via Internet Archive.
