= Emil Burri =

German playwright and screenwriter

- Born: 11 December 1902; Munich, German Empire
- Died: 29 August 1966 (aged 63); Munich, West Germany
- Occupation: Writer
- Years active: 1933–1964 (film)

Emil Burri (1902–1966) was a German playwright and screenwriter who worked on around fifty films during his career, a prominent figure in both Nazi era and post-war German cinema. He also directed the 1942 film Beloved World, his only directorial credit. In 1955 he wrote the screenplay for the Austrian historical heimatfilm Dunja.

In the theatre he was known as a collaborator with Bertolt Brecht.

== Selected filmography ==
=== Screenwriter ===
- Inge and the Millions (1933)
- The Island (1934)
- The Green Domino (1935)
- The Green Domino (1935)
- The Royal Waltz (1935)
- Königswalzer (1935)
- Boccaccio (1936)
- A Wedding Dream (1936)
- Diamonds (1937)
- Faded Melody (1938)
- The Governor (1939)
- A Woman Like You (1939)
- Water for Canitoga (1939)
- Enemies (1940)
- Comrades (1941)
- What Does Brigitte Want? (1941)
- Tonelli (1943)
- Orient Express (1944)
- The Blue Straw Hat (1949)
- Chased by the Devil (1950)
- Royal Children (1950)
- Diary of a Married Woman (1953)
- Walking Back into the Past (1954)
- The Witch (1954)
- Dunja (1955)
- The Royal Waltz (1955)
- Escape from Sahara (1958)
- Stefanie (1958)
- Marili (1959)

=== Director ===
- Beloved World (1942)

== Bibliography ==
- Fritsche, Maria. Homemade Men In Postwar Austrian Cinema: Nationhood, Genre and Masculinity . Berghahn Books, 2013.
