= Enemies (1940 film) =

1940 film directed by Viktor Tourjansky

- Directed by: Viktor Tourjansky
- Written by: Emil Burri; Arthur Luethy; Viktor Tourjansky
- Produced by: Carl Wilhelm Tetting
- Starring: Brigitte Horney; Willy Birgel; Reinhold Lütjohann; Karl-Heinz Peters
- Cinematography: Fritz Arno Wagner
- Edited by: Walter Fredersdorf
- Music by: Lothar Brühne
- Production company: Bavaria Film
- Distributed by: Bavaria Film
- Release date: 7 November 1940
- Running time: 91 minutes
- Country: Nazi Germany
- Language: German

Enemies (German: Feinde) is a 1940 German drama film directed by Viktor Tourjansky and starring Brigitte Horney, Willy Birgel and Reinhold Lütjohann. The film was a Nazi propaganda work, attacking Poland which Germany had invaded the year before. The film's sets were designed by Herbert Hochreiter, Alfred Metscher and Julius von Borsody.

== Cast ==
- Brigitte Horney as Anna
- Willy Birgel as Keith
- Reinhold Lütjohann as Wegner
- Karl-Heinz Peters as Antek
- Arthur Fritz Eugens as Paul Wegner - Sohn
- Iván Petrovich as Jan
- Arnulf Schröder as Wladek
- Hedwig Wangel as Liska
- Carl Wery as Martin
- Beppo Brem as Wegereit
- Gerd Høst as Marianne Wegner, Tochter
- Nicolas Koline as Andreas
- Friedrich Ettel as Keller
- Ludwig Schmid-Wildy as Lessing
- Walter Holten as Böhme
- Hannes Keppler as Hans Martin
- José Held as Stach
- Peter Busse as Tischlergehilfe
- Paul Dahlke as Fährmann
- Maria Heil as Mutti, deutsche Flüchtlingsfrau
- Hans Benedikt
- Katharina Berger as Flüchtlingsfrau
- Heinz Burkhardt as Flüchtling
- Willy Cronauer as Pole in der Schenke
- Anita Düwell as Flüchtlingsfrau
- Walter Ebert-Grassow
- Franz Fröhlich
- Karl Gelfius as Kattwig, Flüchtling
- Fred Goebel as Pole in der Schenke
- Karl Hanft as Polnischer Wachtposten
- Walter Hillbring as Stefan
- Charles Willy Kayser as Flüchtling
- Walter Kindler
- Otto Kuhlmann
- Helmut Kutzner
- Emanuel Matousek as Pole in der Schenke
- Justus Paris as Pole in der Schenke
- Arthur Reinhardt as Ignaz
- Kurt Uhlig as Pole in der Schenke
- Werner Völger
- Dolf Zenzen as Pole in der Schenke

== Bibliography ==
- Hake, Sabine (2001). Popular Cinema of the Third Reich. Austin: University of Texas Press. ISBN 978-0-292-73458-6.
