= Ludwig Schmid-Wildy =

German actor

- Born: 3 May 1896; Aachen, German Empire
- Died: 30 January 1982 (aged 85); Rosenheim, West Germany
- Occupation: Film actor
- Years active: 1934–1982

Ludwig Schmid-Wildy (3 May 1896 – 30 January 1982) was a German actor.

== Selected filmography ==
- Um das Menschenrecht (1934)
- Shock Troop (1934)
- Storms in May (1938)
- Escape in the Dark (1939)
- Uproar in Damascus (1939)
- Enemies (1940)
- The Eternal Spring (1940)
- The Sinful Village (1940)
- A German Robinson Crusoe (1940)
- The Fire Devil (1940)
- Violanta (1942)
- The Eternal Tone (1943)
- The War of the Oxen (1943)
- Music in Salzburg (1944)
- Wild West in Upper Bavaria (1951)
- The Crucifix Carver of Ammergau (1952)
- The Bachelor Trap (1953)
- Der Jäger von Fall (1956)
- The Beggar Student (1956)
- Marriages Forbidden (1957)
- Wir Wunderkinder (1958)
- Oh! This Bavaria! (1960)
- Student of the Bedroom (1970)
- Schwarzwaldfahrt aus Liebeskummer (1974)
- Zwei himmlische Dickschädel (1974)
