= Falstaff in Vienna =

1940 film

- Directed by: Leopold Hainisch
- Written by: Robert Hohlbaum (novella); Max Wallner; Kurt Feltz
- Produced by: Heinz Hille
- Starring: Hans Nielsen; Gusti Wolf; Paul Hörbiger
- Cinematography: Bruno Mondi
- Edited by: Johanna Rosinski
- Music by: Alois Melichar
- Production company: Tobis Film
- Distributed by: Tobis Film
- Release date: 26 September 1940
- Running time: 92 minutes
- Country: Germany
- Language: German

Falstaff in Vienna (German: Falstaff in Wien) is a 1940 German musical comedy film directed by Leopold Hainisch and starring Hans Nielsen, Gusti Wolf and Paul Hörbiger. It portrays the life of the nineteenth century composer Otto Nicolai, known for works such as The Merry Wives of Windsor.

== Cast ==
In alphabetical order

- Wolf Albach-Retty as Robert von Weitenegg
- Ernst Benzinger as Prompter at the premiere
- Erna Berger as Soprano
- Helmut Berndsen as Falstaff actor
- Luise Bethke-Zitzmann as Gardenfrau Mizzi's in Berlin
- Eduard Bornträger as Theatre box attendant
- Julius Brandt as Clerk Pokorny
- Theo Brandt
- Gaston Briese as Stage manager of the Royal Opera House Berlin
- Curt Cappi as Organ grinder
- Michele Danton as Italian street hawker
- Karl Etlinger as Senior clark Mödlinger
- Hugo Flink
- Senta Foltin as Demoiselle Leonie
- Charles Francois as Guest in the theatre box
- Hans Göbel as Singer
- Harry Hardt as Policeman
- Franz Heigl as Schani Habrechtsberger, journeyman at Sturm's
- Karl Hellmer as Schanderl, Theatre attendant
- Fritz Hinz-Fabricius as Theatre porter
- Lizzi Holzschuh as Resi Sturm
- William Huch as Servant at Berliner Opera
- Paul Hörbiger as Court tailor Josef Sturm
- Bruno Hübner as Second Kapellmeister Schlögl
- Eduard Kandl as Bass
- Roselotte Kettmann as Woman
- Wolfgang Kieling as Loisl – Apprentice to master Sturm
- Rudolf Kölling
- Otto Lange
- Herrmann Luddecke
- Hans Nielsen as Otto Nicolai
- Hans Obermanns as Singer
- Paul Otto as Count Redern, General Director of the Royal theatres in Berlin
- Marie-Louise Schilp as Mrs Reich (Mistress Page) – Soprano
- Ingeborg Schmidt-Stein as Mrs Fluth (Mistress Ford)
- Walter Schramm-Duncker as Theatre guest
- Carla Spletter as Soprano
- Gretl Theimer as Kathi, Girl at Sturm's
- Max Vierlinger
- Gustav Waldau as Count Sedlnitzky
- Ludwig Windisch as Singer
- Hans Wocke as Baritone
- Gusti Wolf as Mizzi Stadlmeier
- Aribert Wäscher as Theatre director Pietro Balocchino

== Bibliography ==
- Fawkes, Richard (2000). Opera on Film. London: Duckworth. ISBN 978-0-7156-2943-7.
