= Tonelli (film) =

1943 film directed by Viktor Tourjansky

- Directed by: Victor Tourjansky
- Written by: Emil Burri; Viktor Tourjansky
- Produced by: Georg Witt
- Starring: Ferdinand Marian; Winnie Markus; Mady Rahl
- Cinematography: Franz Koch
- Edited by: Werner Jacobs
- Music by: Lothar Brühne
- Production company: Bavaria Film
- Distributed by: Deutsche Filmvertriebs
- Release date: 12 July 1943
- Running time: 95 minutes
- Country: Germany
- Language: German

Tonelli is a 1943 German drama film directed by Victor Tourjansky and starring Ferdinand Marian, Winnie Markus and Mady Rahl. It was shot at the Bavaria Studios in Munich and at the Deutsches Theater in the city. The film's sets were designed by the art director Ludwig Reiber. It is a circus film, a popular genre in Germany during the war years.

== Synopsis ==
Circus performer Tonio Tonelli discovers his wife Maja having an affair with his colleague Tino. Tonio goes away, and slowly rebuilds his career before meeting tightrope walker Nelly. The two become a popular sensation, which leads his estranged wife to try and force him back into a partnership with her through blackmail. When she is found dead, Tonio is the obvious suspect for her murder.

== Cast ==
- Ferdinand Marian as Tonio Tonelli aka Joro, Artist
- Winnie Markus as Nelly, 'Königin der Luft' Joros Partnerin
- Mady Rahl as Maja, Drahtseilartistin, Frau von Tonio
- Albert Hehn as Tino, Drahtseilartist
- Nikolaus Kolin as Janko, Musik-Clown
- Josef Sieber as Tom, 'Cowboy' beim Wanderzirkus 'Cortrelli'
- Leo Peukert as Zirkusdirektor Cortelli
- Ernst Karchow as Prosecutor
- Wastl Witt as Agent Bauer
- Albert Lippert as Kommissar
- Lutz Götz as Der Theaterdirektor
- José Held as Romero, Artist, Freund Tonellis
- Anni Trautner as Die Wirtin
- Eva Wagner as Marietta, Tonellis Töchterchen
- Helga Warnecke as Adala, die Artistin mit der Hundenummer
- Rudolf Ederer
- Peter Strunk as Ein Artist im Deutschen Theater, Freund Tonellis
- Angelo Ferrari as Francesco, ein italienischer Artist
- Karl Hanft as Der Paßkontrolleur im Zug
- Else Kündinger as Frau Dr. Martin, Leiterin des Kinderheims
- Erik Ode as Der Sekretär des Theateragenten Bauer
- Joseph Offenbach as Der Theaterinspizient
- Friedrich Ohse as Ein Angestellter im Deutschen Theater
- Paul Rehkopf
- Rudolf Reiff as Der Gerichtsvorsitzende
- Ernst Stimmel as Ein Kriminalbeamter
- Michael von Newlinsky as Der Ober im Cafe
- Paul Wagner as Prosecutor's Begleiter
- Arthur Wiesner as Der beisitzende Richter, der Majas Brief vorliest

== Bibliography ==
- Hans-Michael Bock and Tim Bergfelder. The Concise Cinegraph: An Encyclopedia of German Cinema. Berghahn Books, 2009.
