= Hilde Sessak =

German actress

- Born: 27 July 1915; Berlin, German Empire
- Died: 17 April 2003 (aged 87); Berlin, Germany
- Other name: Hilde Czeszak
- Occupation: Actress
- Years active: 1934–1986

Hilde Sessak (27 July 1915 – 17 April 2003) was a German actress who appeared in more than ninety film and television series during her career. She appeared in a number of films during the Nazi era including Quax the Crash Pilot (1941).

== Selected filmography ==
- Herr Kobin geht auf Abenteuer (1934)
- Light Cavalry (1935) - Kellnerin Catella
- The Girl from the Marsh Croft (1935)
- Liebeslied (1935)
- Trouble Backstairs (1935) - Paula Schulze, Tochter
- The Abduction of the Sabine Women (1936) - Marianne Neumeister
- The Haunted Castle (1936) - Wally, Tochter des Waldhüters
- Orders Are Orders (1936) - Annerl
- Der verkannte Lebemann (1936) - Elsie Schultze - Stubenmädchen im Hotel
- City of Anatol (1936) - Dienstmädchen bei Franziska
- Die un-erhörte Frau (1936) - Carola - Brandts Sekretärin
- Intermezzo (1936) - Blanche - Zofe
- Dangerous Crossing (1937) - Lotte Krüger - Zigarettenverkäuferin
- The Ways of Love Are Strange (1937) - Bianca - Zofe bei Antonia
- When Women Keep Silent (1937) - Maria, Sekretärin
- Pan (1937) - Edwarda
- The Coral Princess (1937) - Didi Orsich
- Wie einst im Mai (1938) - Pauline Krause - Tochter
- Das Ehesanatorium (1938) - Franziska Kaub
- Northern Lights (1938) - Petra Hansen
- Die Pfingstorgel (1938) - Bienchen - ihre Tochter
- Water for Canitoga (1939) - Winifred Gardener
- The Curtain Falls (1939) - Vera Findtejs
- A Man Astray (1940) - Marcella Duvallo
- The Rothschilds (1940)
- Left of the Isar, Right of the Spree (1940) - Lotte
- Kleider machen Leute (1940) - Fräulein von Serafin
- Alarm (1941) - Platzanweiserin Helene Hoesch
- Happiness is the Main Thing (1941)
- Jungens (1941) - Lene
- Six Days of Leave (1941) - Sybille Fabius
- Quax the Crash Pilot (1941) - Adelheid
- Illusion (1941) - Korali
- Luisa Sanfelice (1942) - Lady Hamilton
- Fünftausend Mark Belohnung (1942) - Nora - Wengrafs Nichte
- Paracelsus (1943) - Waitress
- Liebe, Leidenschaft und Leid (1943) - Anna
- Fahrt ins Abenteuer (1943) - Eliza
- A Salzburg Comedy (1943) - Jutta
- Don't Talk to Me About Love (1943) - Marzella
- Die Feuerzangenbowle (1944) - Marion
- Orient Express (1944) - Vera Voneitz, aka Vera Pamalet
- Das alte Lied (1945) - Wanda
- Philine (1949) - Karla Lorenz - Philines Freundin
- Der große Fall (1949) - Eine höchst gefährliche Dame
- Das Beil von Wandsbek (1950) - Anneliese Blüthe
- The Woman from Last Night (1950)
- The Staircase (1950) - Olga Scharnetzki
- Who Drove the Grey Ford? (1950) - Kellnerin bei Edu Schröder
- Not Without Gisela (1951) - Melanie, Tänzerin
- When the Evening Bells Ring (1951)
- Story of a Young Couple (1952) - Carla
- The Man Between (1953) - Lizzi
- The Angel with the Flaming Sword (1954) - Elfriede Marein
- The Confession of Ina Kahr (1954)
- Sergeant Borck (1955) - Fanny Himmelreich
- Before God and Man (1955)
- Iron Gustav (1958) - Frau Vietzke
- For Love and Others (1959) - Frau Lührmann
- We Cellar Children (1960) - Mutter Prinz
- Jeder stirbt für sich allein (1962, TV Movie) - Frau Gesch
- Murderer in the Fog (1964) - Frau Schmittner
- Der Hexer (1964) - Wardress
- Fanny Hill (1964) - Mrs. Snow
- Long Legs, Long Fingers (1966) - Wärterin
- The Hunchback of Soho (1966) - Oberin
- Das Geständnis eines Mädchens (1967) - Leiterin des Mädchenheims
- The Gorilla of Soho (1968) - Sister Elizabeth
- Ehemänner-Report (1971) - Frau Nickel
- Grete Minde (1977) - Regine
- Heinrich (1977)

== Bibliography ==
- Reimer, Robert C. (2000). Cultural History Through a National Socialist Lens: Essays on the Cinema of the Third Reich. Rochester, NY: Camden House. ISBN 978-1-57113-164-5.
