= Lena Neumann =

German film editor

Lena Neumann was a German film editor who worked on more than fifty films during her career, from 1934 to 1963. She began her career in the Nazi era, working at a variety of leading German companies including UFA. After the Second World War, she worked on rubble films such as Somewhere in Berlin. She was employed by the East German state studio DEFA during the Cold War

== Selected filmography ==
- Between Two Hearts (1934)
- The Riders of German East Africa (1934)
- The Champion of Pontresina (1934)
- William Tell (1934)
- The Unknown (1936)
- Alarm in Peking (1937)
- Ball at the Metropol (1937)
- Sergeant Berry (1938)
- I Love You (1938)
- The Marriage Swindler (1938)
- Water for Canitoga (1939)
- Beloved World (1942)
- Paracelsus (1943)
- Don't Talk to Me About Love (1943)
- Bravo, Little Thomas (1945)
- Wozzeck (1947)
- Nothing But Coincidence (1949)
- The Captain from Cologne (1956)

== Bibliography ==
- Shandley, Robert. Rubble Films: German Cinema in the Shadow of the Third Reich. Temple University Press, 2010.
