= Hans Pössenbacher =

German actor

- Born: 14 July 1895; Graz, Austria-Hungary
- Died: 24 February 1979 (aged 83); Munich, West Germany
- Occupation: Film actor
- Years active: 1934–1977

Hans Pössenbacher (14 July 1895 – 24 February 1979) was an Austrian-born German actor.

== Filmography ==
Year	Title	Role	Notes
1934	Shock Troop	Anderl	
1934	Um das Menschenrecht	Ein Spartakist	
1936	Diener lassen bitten		
1938	Dreizehn Mann und eine Kanone		
1947	Am Ende der Welt	Gustav Lukas	
1949	Begegnung mit Werther		
1950	The Violin Maker of Mittenwald	Loisl	
1952	Nights on the Road		
1952	My Name is Niki	Bahnhofsvorstand	
1953	The Chaplain of San Lorenzo	Como	
1954	The Beginning Was Sin	Bauer	
1955	08/15 at Home	Krawattke	
1959	The Man Who Walked Through the Wall	Herr Blum - der Zahlenwurm	Uncredited
1962	The Bashful Elephant	Constable	
1962	The Longest Day	German officer playing cards	Uncredited
1963	Als ich beim Käthele im Wald war		
1968	The Castle	Innkeeper	
1970	Black Flowers for the Bride	Carl	
1972	Sie liebten sich einen Sommer	Krug	
1977	Die Jugendstreiche des Knaben Karl		
