= Journey into the Past =

1943 film

- Directed by: Hans H. Zerlett
- Written by: Gerda Ital; Hans H. Zerlett
- Produced by: Georg Fiebiger
- Starring: Olga Tschechowa; Ferdinand Marian; Margot Hielscher
- Cinematography: Bruno Stephan
- Edited by: Gottlieb Madl
- Music by: Bernhard Eichhorn
- Production company: Bavaria Film
- Distributed by: Deutsche Filmvertriebs
- Release date: 5 November 1943
- Running time: 81 minutes
- Country: Germany
- Language: German

Journey into the Past (German: Reise in die Vergangenheit) is a 1943 German romantic drama film directed by Hans H. Zerlett and starring Olga Tschechowa, Ferdinand Marian and Margot Hielscher. It was shot at the Bavaria Studios in Munich. The film's sets were designed by the art directors Johann Massias and Heinrich Weidemann. It is a loose remake of the 1937 French film Life Dances On by Julien Duvivier.

== Cast ==
- Olga Tschechowa as Marianne von der Halden
- Ferdinand Marian as Carlo Ernst
- Margot Hielscher as Anita von der Halden, Tochter
- Hilde Hildebrand as Lily, Carlos Frau
- Will Dohm as Kammersänder Paul Schneider
- Theodor Loos as Generalmusikdirektor Prof. Dr. Fritz Elmers
- Hans Leibelt as Dr.Werner Birkner
- Rudolf Prack as Michael BrantnerLehrer
- Fritz Odemar as Professor Hans Kemmerer, Pianist
- Eva Tinschmann as Tina, Haushälterin bei Marianne
- Joseph Offenbach as Der Garderobier bei Paul Schneider
- Oscar Sabo as Konzertsaaldiener
- Arthur Wiesner as Der Gastwirt
- Liesl Karlstadt as Frau Knoll, Zimmerfrau Paul Schneiders
- Klaus Pohl as Portier im Konservatorium
- Lotte Rausch as Mathilde, Braut Dr. Werner Birkners
- Maria Seidler as Frau Gericke, Haushälterin
- Inge van der Straaten as Frau Kalmm, Zimmerfrau Carlo Ernsts

== Bibliography ==
- Klaus, Ulrich J. Deutsche Tonfilme: Jahrgang 1943. Klaus-Archiv, 1988.
- Romani, Cinzia. Tainted Goddesses : Female Film Stars of the Third Reich. Da Capo Press, 1992.
