= Gusti Wolf =

Austrian actress

- Born: 11 April 1912; Vienna, Austria-Hungary
- Died: 5 May 2007 (aged 95); Vienna, Austria
- Occupation: actress

Gusti Wolf (11 April 1912 – 5 May 2007) was an Austrian stage, film, and television actress.

== Biography ==
Born in Vienna, Wolf was adopted by the painter, Felix Albrecht Harta, who became her foster father. Wolf made her stage debut at the Burgtheater in 1934 and from there moved on to Ostrava, Munich, and Berlin. In 1946, she was engaged at the Burgtheater again, whose Honorary Member she became in 1987.

She made her film debut in 1937, played mainly supporting roles in a number of UFA movies, and, after the war, continued her film career, playing alongside actors such as Hans Moser, Susi Nicoletti, Johannes Heesters, Marika Rökk, and Oskar Sima.

Her television credits include series such as Der alte Richter (1969–70), the Austrian cult classic Kottan ermittelt (1981–83), the comedy series Wenn das die Nachbarn wüßten (1990–92), and guest roles in Derrick, Tatort, and Kommissar Rex.

Wolf never married and didn't have any children. She lived in Vienna.

== Selected filmography ==
- The Unexcused Hour (1937)
- Little County Court (1938)
- Falstaff in Vienna (1940)
- Orient Express (1944)
- Bonus on Death (1950)
- When a Woman Loves (1950)
- Shame on You, Brigitte! (1952)
- The Divorcée (1953)
- Daughter of the Regiment (1953)
- Rose-Girl Resli (1954)
- Das Riesenrad (1961)
- The Model Boy (1963)
- Derrick - Season 2, Episode 8: "Pfandhaus" (1975)

== Decorations and awards ==
- 1934: 2nd Prize - Silver medal at the Vienna International Film Festival
- 1966: Kammerschauspielerin
- 1972: Burgtheater ring
- 1977: Austrian Cross of Honour for Science and Art, 1st class
- 1981: Special cup for 35 years of membership at the Burgtheater
- 1984: Gold pendant with engraving for 40 years Burgtheater
- 1985: Grand Decoration of Honour for Services to the Republic of Austria
- 1987: Honorary Member of the Burgtheater
- 1992: Nestroy Ring
- 1992: Film Award Rose Hill
- 1993: Golden Romy as the most popular actress
- 1997: Golden Medal of Honour for Services to the City of Vienna
- 2000: Appointment as Professor
- 2001: Golden Rathausmann
- 2003: Nestroy Theatre Prize for lifetime achievement
