= Rudolf van der Noss =

German film director

- Born: 21 October 1889; Krefeld, German Empire
- Died: 12 June 1946 (aged 56); Berlin, Germany
- Occupations: Director, actor
- Years active: 1931-1940 (film)

Rudolf van der Noss (1889–1946) was a German film director, active during the 1930s. He is noted in particular for his 1938 crime film Police Report (1939) and the drama Twilight, the latter produced for UFA.

== Selected filmography ==
- Alarm at Midnight (1931)
- Invitation to the Dance (1934)
- The Man with the Paw (1935)
- Geheimnis eines alten Hauses (1936)
- Sein letztes Modell (1937)
- Police Report (1939)
- Twilight (1940)

== Bibliography ==
- Frey, David. Jews, Nazis and the Cinema of Hungary: The Tragedy of Success, 1929-1944. Bloomsbury Publishing, 2017.
- Giesen, Rolf. Nazi Propaganda Films: A History and Filmography. McFarland & Company, 2003.
- Kreimeier, Klaus. The Ufa Story: A History of Germany's Greatest Film Company, 1918–1945. University of California Press, 1999.
