= Michael von Newlinsky =

Austrian actor (1891–1964)

- Born: 21 June 1891; Vienna, Austria-Hungary
- Died: 14 August 1964 (aged 73); West Berlin, West Germany
- Occupations: Film actor Stage actor
- Years active: 1928–1953 (film)

Michael von Newlinsky (21 June 1891 – 14 August 1964) was an Austrian film actor who appeared in numerous supporting roles during his career, in films such as Georg Wilhelm Pabst's Pandora's Box (1929).

== Selected filmography ==
- Under Suspicion (1928)
- The Republic of Flappers (1928)
- My Heart is a Jazz Band (1929)
- Inherited Passions (1929)
- The League of Three (1929)
- The Wonderful Lies of Nina Petrovna (1929)
- Ludwig II, King of Bavaria (1929)
- Katharina Knie (1929)
- Pandora's Box (1929)
- Morals at Midnight (1930)
- Two Worlds (1930)
- The Son of the White Mountain (1930)
- Mountains on Fire (1931)
- The Street Song (1931)
- The Case of Colonel Redl (1931)
- The Little Escapade (1931)
- Her Grace Commands (1931)
- Elisabeth of Austria (1931)
- Children of Fortune (1931)
- The Magic Top Hat (1932)
- A Tremendously Rich Man (1932)
- The Invisible Front (1932)
- Marschall Vorwärts (1932)
- The Four from Bob 13 (1932)
- Today Is the Day (1933)
- The Testament of Dr. Mabuse (1933)
- The Sporck Battalion (1934)
- A Woman Who Knows What She Wants (1934)
- The Double (1934)
- I Was Jack Mortimer (1935)
- The Red Rider (1935)
- Doctor Engel (1936)
- Der Kaiser von Kalifornien (1936)
- Stronger Than Regulations (1936)
- Under Blazing Heavens (1936)
- Ride to Freedom (1937)
- Gordian the Tyrant (1937)
- An Enemy of the People (1937)
- Togger (1937)
- Carousel (1937)
- Dangerous Game (1937)
- A Prussian Love Story (1938)
- Faded Melody (1938)
- Red Orchids (1938)
- Rubber (1938)
- The Day After the Divorce (1938)
- Men, Animals and Sensations (1938)
- Target in the Clouds (1939)
- Capriccio (1938)
- Kitty and the World Conference (1939)
- Hurrah! I'm a Father (1939)
- Stars of Variety (1939)
- Kora Terry (1940)
- Counterfeiters (1940)
- Friedemann Bach (1941)
- The Way to Freedom (1941)
- Beloved World (1942)
- Tonelli (1943)
- A Man With Principles? (1943)
- The Years Pass (1945)
- Dark Eyes (1951)
- Geheimakten Solvay (1953)

== Bibliography ==
- Roberts, Ian. German Expressionist Cinema: The World of Light and Shadow. Wallflower Press, 2008.
