= Orders Are Orders (1936 film) =

1936 film

- Directed by: Alwin Elling
- Written by: Georg Zoch
- Starring: Weiss Ferdl; Trude Hesterberg; Eric Helgar
- Cinematography: Eduard Hoesch
- Music by: Fritz Wenneis
- Production company: Deka Film
- Release date: 29 May 1936
- Running time: 95 minutes
- Country: Germany
- Language: German

Orders Are Orders (German: Befehl ist Befehl) is a 1936 German comedy film directed by Alwin Elling and starring Weiss Ferdl, Trude Hesterberg and Eric Helgar. It was shot at the Halensee Studios in Berlin.

== Synopsis ==
Bavarian Sergeant Josef Murr tries to readjust to civilian life after twelve years serving in the German Army. At first he struggles to settle in various jobs, but eventually flourishes when he is called upon to impose discipline on the staff of a badly managed hotel.

== Cast ==
- Weiss Ferdl as Josef Murr
- Trude Hesterberg as Alwine Sommer
- Elfriede Sandner as Inge
- Eric Helgar as Hubert
- Vicky Werckmeister as Mali
- Else Reval as Leni
- Oskar Sima as Schwanke
- Hubert von Meyerinck as Rittmeister von Schlackberg
- Leopold von Ledebur as Der Oberst
- Carl Auen as Der Hauptmann
- Gerhard Dammann as Hinrichs - Konfektionär
- Kurt Vespermann as Hibberlich - Verkäufer
- Hilde Sessak as Annerl
- Leo Peukert as Hotelportier
- Erich Bartels as Chef im Reisebüro
- Anita Düwell as Sekretärin im Reisebüro
- Arthur Reinhardt as Kompaniefeldwebel
- Gaston Briese as Der Dicke bei der Führung
- Herbert Weissbach as Der spleenige Engländer
- Leo Sloma as Der Dicke im Konfektionsladen
- Hans Schneider as Xaver Murr

== Bibliography ==
- Klaus, Ulrich J. Deutsche Tonfilme: Jahrgang 1936. Klaus-Archiv, 1988.
- Waldman, Harry. Nazi Films In America, 1933-1942. McFarland & Co, 2008.
