= Premiere (1937 film) =

1937 film directed by Géza von Bolváry

- Directed by: Géza von Bolváry
- Written by: Friedrich Dammann; Hanns Schachner; Max Wallner
- Produced by: Franz Hoffermann; Walter W. Trinks
- Starring: Zarah Leander; Attila Hörbiger; Karl Martell; Theo Lingen
- Cinematography: Franz Planer
- Edited by: Hermann Haller
- Music by: Willy Schmidt-Gentner
- Production company: Gloria-Film
- Distributed by: Tobis-Sascha Film
- Release date: 5 February 1937
- Running time: 82 minutes
- Country: Austria
- Language: German

Premiere is a 1937 Austrian musical crime film directed by Géza von Bolváry and starring Zarah Leander, Attila Hörbiger, and Karl Martell. The wealthy backer of a Viennese musical revue is murdered on the first night of the show. It was Leander's first German language role after previously appearing in Swedish films. On the basis of her performance in the film, Leander was signed by the German Major studio UFA after their major rival, Tobis, had decided she had insufficient star appeal. Her next film To New Shores established Leander as the leading star in Germany.

In 1938 the film was remade in Britain with many of the original musical numbers re-used.

== Main cast ==
- Zarah Leander as Carmen Daviot
- Attila Hörbiger as Doctor Helder, Polizeikommissar
- Karl Martell as Fred Nissen
- Theo Lingen as Inspizient Dornbusch
- Maria Bard as Lydia Loo
- Karl Günther as Reinhold, Finanzier
- Walter Steinbeck as Director
- Karl Skraup as Requisiteur Lohrmann
- Ferdinand Mayerhofer as Theaterarzt Dr. Seebauer
- Hely Raschka as Polly
- Johanna Terwin as Mrs. Helder
- Richard Eybner as Mucky
- Robert Valberg as Chef der Kriminalpolizei

== Bibliography ==
- Ascheid, Antje (2003). Hitler's Heroines: Stardom and Womanhood in Nazi Cinema. Philadelphia: Temple University Press. ISBN 978-1-56639-984-5.
- Knopp, Guido (2003). Hitler's Women. Translated by McGeoch, Angus. New York: Routledge. ISBN 978-0-415-94730-5.
