= Water for Canitoga =

1939 film

- DVD cover
- Directed by: Herbert Selpin
- Written by: Emil Burri; Peter Francke; Hans Rehfisch (play); Otto Eis (play); Egon Eis (play)
- Produced by: Carl Wilhelm Tetting
- Starring: Hans Albers; Charlotte Susa; Josef Sieber
- Cinematography: Josef Illig; Franz Koch
- Edited by: Lena Neumann
- Music by: Peter Kreuder
- Production company: Bavaria Film
- Distributed by: Bavaria Film
- Release date: 10 March 1939
- Running time: 119 minutes
- Country: Germany
- Language: German

Water for Canitoga (German: Wasser für Canitoga) is a 1939 German western film directed by Herbert Selpin and starring Hans Albers, Charlotte Susa and Josef Sieber. The film is a "Northern", set in Canada in 1905 where an engineer is working to construct a new water supply system despite repeated attempts at sabotage. It is based on a play by Hans Rehfisch, Otto Eis and Egon Eis.

It was made at the Bavaria Studios in Munich. The film's sets were designed by the art directors Wilhelm Depenau, Ludwig Reiber and Arthur Schwarz.

== Cast ==
- Hans Albers as Ingenieur Captain Oliver Montstuart / Bauingenieur Nicholsen
- Charlotte Susa as Lilly
- Josef Sieber as Ingenieur Ingram
- Peter Voß as Chefingenieur Captain Gilbert Trafford
- Hilde Sessak as Sekretärin Winifred Gardener
- Andrews Engelmann as Ruski
- Karl Dannemann as Dyke
- Hans Mierendorff as Old Shatterhand
- Heinrich Schroth as Gouverneur
- Ernst Fritz Fürbringer as Sheriff von Canitoga
- Beppo Brem as Sprengmeister bei der Sabotage
- Willy Rösner as Bauarbeiter Reeve
- Carl Wery as Vorarbeiter Westbrook
- Heinrich Kalnberg as Sprengmeister Reechy
- Katja Bennefeld as Straßenmädchen in der Silvesternacht
- Peter Busse as Silvesterfeiernder
- Henry Pleß as Vormann an der Pressluftzentrale
- Fritz Reiff as Ormand, Adjutant des Gouverneurs
- Arthur Reinhardt as Baustellenarbeiter
- Ernst Rotmund as Direktor
- Herta de Salvador as Barfrau
- Arnulf Schröder as Lagerarzt
- Bruno Ziener as Professor Deutsch
- Louis Brody as Johnny

== Bibliography ==
- Hull, David Stewart. Film in the Third Reich: a study of the German cinema, 1933-1945. University of California Press, 1969.
