= The Man with the Paw =

1935 film

- Directed by: Rudolf van der Noss
- Written by: Philipp Lothar Mayring; Thea von Harbou
- Based on: The Man with the Paw by Fritz Zeckendorf
- Produced by: Heinz Joachim Ewert
- Starring: Paul Wegener; Rose Stradner; Johannes Riemann
- Cinematography: Eduard Hoesch
- Edited by: Carl Otto Bartning
- Music by: Wolfgang Zeller
- Production company: Deka Film
- Distributed by: Neue Deutsch Lichtspiel-Syndikat Verleih
- Release date: 12 November 1935
- Running time: 100 minutes
- Country: Germany
- Language: German

The Man with the Paw (German: Der Mann mit der Pranke) is a 1935 German crime drama film directed by Rudolf van der Noss and starring Paul Wegener, Rose Stradner and Johannes Riemann. It was shot at the Grunewald Studios of Tobis Film in Berlin. The film's sets were designed by the art directors Artur Günther and Heinrich Richter. It premiered at the Ufa-Palast am Zoo in Berlin.

== Synopsis ==
The wealthy bank president Wiegant (nicknamed the "man with the paw") is in love with Lena the wife of the bank's lawyer Hugo Kröning. He is accused of making a fraudulent phone conversation with a countess, in which he conned her out of a large sum of money. However, he couldn't possibly have made the call as he was at that time in a liaison with Lena, but has to keep his mouth shut in order to protect her. With the assistance of his secretary Eve and Lena, he sets out to find the real culprits.

== Cast ==
- Paul Wegener as Wiegant, Präsident der Industrie-Bank
- Rose Stradner as Lena Kröning
- Johannes Riemann as Dr. Hugo Kröning
- Kurt Vespermann as Richard Möllenhof
- Grethe Weiser as Susi Möllenhof
- Hilde Weissner as Eve Gernsheim
- Ernst Legal as Kraatz, Chauffeur
- Erich Fiedler as Lattenberg, Prokurist
- Emmy Wyda as Gräfin Steindorff
- Otto Stoeckel as Bartosch, Betrüger
- Ernst Rotmund as Wilczinski, Betrüger
- Walter Steinbeck as Kommissar Sponholz
- F.W. Schröder-Schrom as Haller, Untersuchungsrichter
- Erwin Hartung as Sänger
- Armin Schweizer as Beamter im Leihaus
- Walter Steinweg as Hotelangestellter

== Bibliography ==
- Buruma, Ian. Stay Alive: Berlin, 1939–1945. Atlantic Books, 2026.
- Giesen, Rolf. The Nosferatu Story: The Seminal Horror Film, Its Predecessors and Its Enduring Legacy. McFarland, 2025.
- Klaus, Ulrich J. Deutsche Tonfilme: Jahrgang 1935. Klaus-Archiv, 1988.
