= Ferdinand Marian =

Austrian actor (1902–1946)

- Born: Ferdinand Heinrich Johann Haschkowetz; 14 August 1902; Vienna, Austria-Hungary
- Died: 7 August 1946 (aged 43); Pulling, Allied-occupied Germany
- Occupation: Actor
- Spouses: Irene Saager; Maria Byk

Ferdinand Heinrich Johann Haschkowetz (14 August 1902 – 7 August 1946), known by the stage name Ferdinand Marian, was an Austrian actor. Though a prolific stage actor in Berlin and a popular matinée idol throughout the 1930s and early '40s, he is most remembered for playing the lead role of Joseph Süß Oppenheimer in the notorious Nazi propaganda film Jud Süß (1940).

== Early life and career ==
Born in Vienna, the son of an opera singer, Marian turned to the stage early, though he never attended any drama classes. He ran away from home and abandoned his studies as an engineer to work as an extra at several Austrian and German theatres. In 1938 he joined the ensemble of the Deutsches Theater in Berlin, where he was acclaimed for his performance as Iago in Shakespeare's Othello.

Marian had also appeared in movies like Curtis Bernhardt's Der Tunnel since 1933, and had his breakthrough starring together with Zarah Leander in 1937's La Habanera, directed by Douglas Sirk. His role as the suave but amoral Don Pedro Avila added to his image as an adorable but devious womanizer.

== Jud Süß ==
Marian's career was overshadowed by his appearance as the title character in the German antisemitic film of Lion Feuchtwanger's book Jud Süß, directed by Veit Harlan. This 1940 film, made under the supervision of Propaganda Minister Joseph Goebbels, is widely considered to be one of the most hateful depictions of Jews in film. (A British film with the same title had appeared earlier.)

His depiction of the title character followed stereotypes of Jews as being materialistic, immoral, cunning and untrustworthy. With the exception of Marian's character – who shaved off his beard and wore Gentile attire for most of the story – the actors playing Jewish male characters were made up to look unappealing and alien (non-German).

The film was a great success, both commercially and ideologically. Heinrich Himmler ordered that the film be shown to SS units about to be sent against Jews, to non-Jewish populations of areas where Jews were about to be deported, and to concentration camp guards.

Marian's willing participation in Jud Süß and his belief in its message remain contentious. During his lifetime he was considered apolitical, never holding membership in any political party or expressing support for Nazism. His personal life seemingly contradicted the antisemitism of his best-known role. He had a daughter from his first marriage to Jewish pianist Irene Saager. His second wife's former husband Julius Gellner was also Jewish and Marian and his wife protected him from reprisals by hiding him in their home.

Friedrich Knilli, author of the Marian biography Ich war Jud Süß – Die Geschichte des Filmstars Ferdinand Marian ('I was Jud Suss - The Story of the Movie Star Ferdinand Marian') indicated that Marian was at minimum pressured and at maximum coerced by Goebbels into participating in the film, which he had initially considered distasteful, through implicit threats against his family. Knilli's assertions match those of director Veit Harlan, who claimed in a war crimes trial that he was coerced by Goebbels into making the film, and attempted to minimize or sanitize the antisemitic elements to little avail.

According to Knilli, Marian never came to terms with his involvement in the film, and the guilt led to a spiraling pattern of alcoholism that dominated his later life.

== Later roles ==
The same year as Jud Süß, Marian starred in another propaganda film directed by Veit Harlan, Ohm Krüger. The film was a biopic of Boer political leader Paul Kruger, and portrayed the British as the villains of the Second Boer War, with Marian playing British mastermind Cecil Rhodes. The film co-starred Emil Jannings and Gustaf Gründgens, who both had rejected the role of Jud Süß the year before.

In 1943 he starred as Cagliostro in Josef von Báky's fantasy comedy Münchhausen, and also in Romance in a Minor Key, and Tonelli. His last film role was in Das Gesetz der Liebe (1945).

== Death ==
Marian died in a road accident in 1946 near the village of Dürneck (today part of Freising) in Bavaria, probably driving under the influence of alcohol. It is said that he was on his way to Munich with a borrowed car to collect denazification papers that with the permission of US film officer Eric Pleskow would allow him to work again, having celebrated this news just beforehand. Friedrich Knilli suggested the death was suicide, as Marian had been unable to cope with his participation in Jud Süß.

== In popular culture ==
Marian is played by Tobias Moretti in the 2010 film Jew Suss: Rise and Fall, a biopic about the production and release of Jud Süß, based on Friedrich Knilli's biography.

The film takes many liberties with the true story, fictionalizing Marian's personal life by combining his two wives into a single character, and expanding the role of Julius Gellner (renamed 'Wilhelm Adolf Deutscher').

== Filmography ==
- The Tunnel (1933, dir. Curtis Bernhardt) as The Agitator
- A Wedding Dream (1936, dir. Erich Engel) as Paul Puschkinow
- The Voice of the Heart (1937, dir. Karlheinz Martin) as Prince Konstantin
- Madame Bovary (1937, dir. Gerhard Lamprecht) as Rodolphe Boulanger
- La Habanera (1937, dir. Douglas Sirk) as Don Pedro de Havila
- Northern Lights (1938, dir. Herbert B. Fredersdorf) as Halvard
- The Fourth Is Not Coming (1939, dir. Max W. Kimmich) as Generaldirektor Kolman
- Morgen werde ich verhaftet (1939, dir. Karl Heinz Stroux) as Juan Perez
- Dein Leben gehört mir (1939, dir. Johannes Meyer)
- The Fox of Glenarvon (1940, dir. Max W. Kimmich) as Justice of the peace Grandison
- Aus erster Ehe (1940, dir. Paul Verhoeven) as Professor Walter Helmerding
- Jud Süß (1940, dir. Veit Harlan) as Joseph Süß Oppenheimer
- Ohm Krüger (1941, dir. Hans Steinhoff) as Cecil Rhodes
- Ein Zug fährt ab (1942, dir. Johannes Meyer) as Michael Garden
- Münchhausen (1943, dir. Josef von Báky) as Count Cagliostro
- Romance in a Minor Key (1943, dir. Helmut Käutner) as Michael
- Tonelli (1943, dir. Viktor Tourjansky) as Tonio Torelli / Jaro
- Journey into the Past (1943, dir. Hans H. Zerlett) as Carlo Ernst
- In flagranti (1944, dir. Hans Schweikart) as Ing. Alfred Peters
- Freunde (1944, dir. E. W. Emo) as Guido
- Night of the Twelve (1945, dir. Hans Schweikart) as Agent Leopold Lenski
- Dreimal Komödie (1945, dir. Viktor Tourjansky) as Professor Viktor Arnim
- Law of Love (1945, dir. Hans Schweikart) as Baron Pistolecran (final film role)
