= Mila Kopp =

Austrian actress

- Born: 20 October 1904; Vienna, Austro-Hungarian Empire
- Died: 14 January 1973 (aged 68); Stuttgart, West Germany
- Years active: 1942 - 1971 (film & TV)

Mila Kopp (20 October 1904 – 14 January 1973) was an Austrian stage, film and television actress.

== Filmography ==
Year	Title	Role	Notes
1942	Andreas Schlüter	Elisabeth Schlüter	
1949	The Murder Trial of Doctor Jordan	Livia Mantuzza	
1952	A Very Big Child		
1953	Hocuspocus	Gustavs Witwe	Uncredited
1955	Mamitschka	Mamitschka	
1957	El Hakim		
1960	A Woman for Life	Mutter Barnebusch	

== Bibliography ==
- Goble, Alan. The Complete Index to Literary Sources in Film. Walter de Gruyter, 1999.
