= Beloved World =

1942 film

- Directed by: Emil Burri
- Written by: Peter Francke; Emil Burri
- Produced by: Curt Prickler
- Starring: Brigitte Horney; Willy Fritsch; Paul Dahlke
- Cinematography: Franz Weihmayr
- Edited by: Lena Neumann
- Music by: Lothar Brühne
- Production company: Bavaria Film
- Distributed by: Deutsche Filmvertriebs
- Release date: 30 October 1942
- Running time: 89 minutes
- Country: Germany
- Language: German

Beloved World (German: Geliebte Welt) is a 1942 German romantic comedy film directed by Emil Burri and starring Brigitte Horney, Willy Fritsch, and Paul Dahlke. It was shot at the Bavaria Studios in Munich. The film's sets were designed by the art directors Kurt Dürnhöfer, Franz Koehn and Hans Kuhnert.

== Plot ==
Director General Dr. Blohm and his secretary Karin Hanke are both unmarried and a close-knit couple at work. Professionally, the two play perfectly hand in hand. Since both of them have no private commitments, they focus exclusively on their professional activities. When the two are seen in public, where they inevitably go out together in the evenings, those around them suspect that the two are a couple. One day, Blohm's friend Strickbach, who of course knows that the two are not together, asks Blohm why he actually doesn't marry the attractive Karin.

Everything goes well until one day the director general and his secretary have to spend a night together after an emergency landing far away from civilization. In addition, Blohm wonders whether his friend Strickbach might not be right when he asked why he didn't marry his secretary. So he gathers all his courage and proposes marriage to Karin, which she accepts, completely surprised.

But now, of course, everything changes. Since Karin is now Blohm's wife, both are separated from each other by work life. Blohm continues to take care of his job as director general, while Karin, who is now his wife, no longer has to be involved in day-to-day business. For her part, however, Karin cannot deal with the new situation. Her sudden inactivity in day-to-day business is alien to her and also uncomfortable. As a result, she decides to separate from her husband in order to finally be active and productive again.

== Cast ==
- Brigitte Horney as Karin Ranke
- Willy Fritsch as Generaldirektor Dr. Blohm
- Paul Dahlke as Professor Strickbach
- Else von Möllendorff as Rosi Hübner, Sekretärin
- Mady Rahl as Beate Kästner
- Walter Janssen as Direktor Ullmer
- Elisabeth Markus as Frau Ullmer
- Hedwig Wangel as Frau Pilz, Haushälterin bei Dr. Blohm
- Margarete Haagen as Frau Kramer
- Gustav Waldau as Direktor Steinkopf
- Karl Blühm as Ingenieur Becker
- Klaus Pohl as Bürovorsteher Dohle
- Trude Haefelin
- Harry Hardt
- Erich Dunskus
- Adolf Fischer
- Arthur Wiesner
- Michael von Newlinsky

== Bibliography ==
- Hake, Sabine (2001). Popular Cinema of the Third Reich. Austin: University of Texas Press. ISBN 978-0-292-73458-6.
