= Comrades (1941 film) =

1941 film

- Directed by: Hans Schweikart
- Written by: Emil Burri; Peter Francke
- Produced by: Curt Prickler
- Starring: Willy Birgel; Martin Urtel; Karin Hardt
- Cinematography: Franz Koch
- Edited by: Werner Jacobs
- Music by: Alois Melichar
- Production company: Bavaria Film
- Distributed by: Bavaria Film
- Release date: 26 September 1941
- Running time: 102 minutes
- Country: Germany
- Language: German

Comrades (German: Kameraden) is a 1941 German historical war film directed by Hans Schweikart and starring Willy Birgel, Martin Urtel and Karin Hardt. It was part of the tradition of Prussian films, gloryifying scenes from German history. It was shot at the Bavaria Studios in Munich and the Barrandov Studios in Prague and on location around the latter city. The film's sets were designed by the art directors Rudolf Pfenninger and Ludwig Reiber.

== Synopsis ==
During the Napoleonic Wars Lieutenant Karl von Wedell takes part in the 1809 Prussian uprising against French forces led by Ferdinand von Schill. When the uprising is defeated, eleven of the officers who led the rebellion are executed. Karl von Wedell is spared death but is instead sentenced to lifetime imprisonment. His brother Heinrich, a major who had opposed Von Schill's rash actions that had disobeyed the orders of Frederick William II, now plans to rescue him.

== Cast ==
- Willy Birgel as Major Karl von Wedell
- Martin Urtel as Leutnant Heinrich von Wedell
- Karin Hardt as Christine von Krusemarck
- Rudolf Fernau as Graf Kerski
- Maria Nicklisch as Henriette Kerski
- Paul Dahlke as Rappel, Bursche
- Rolf Weih as Legationsrat von Bredow
- Alexander Golling as Marschall Davout
- Herbert Hübner as Oberst Dupont
- Otto Treßler as Gesandter von Krusemarck
- Carl Wery as General von York
- Günther Hadank as Major von Muthesius
- Paul Wagner as Major von Bülow
- Friedrich Ulmer as Major von Brockdorff
- Charles Willy Kayser as Premierleutnant von Hasse
- Alexander Ponto as Premierleutnant Jahn
- Hans Paetsch as Leutnant von Flemming
- Fritz Kösling as Leutnant von Keffenbrinck
- Ernst Fritz Fürbringer as Gesandter Graf Saint Marsan
- Erhard Siedel as Dr. Halm
- Ilse Fürstenberg as Pauline
- Fritz Hoopts as Herr Schlichting
- Hedwig Wangel as Frau Schlichting
- Albert Johannes as Feldjäger
- Karl-Heinz Peters as Französischer Arzt
- Volker Soetbeer as Gottlieb
- Hans Meyer-Hanno as Unteroffizier Jeschke
- Hans Hermann Schaufuß as Französicher Regimentsarzt
- Erich Gast as Französischer Offizier

== Bibliography ==
- Klaus, Ulrich J. Deutsche Tonfilme: Jahrgang 1941. Klaus-Archiv, 1988.
- Klossner, Michael. The Europe of 1500-1815 on Film and Television: A Worldwide Filmography of Over 2550 Works, 1895 Through 2000. McFarland, 2002.
- Marquardt, Axel & Rathsack, Heinz. (ed.) Preussen im Film: Eine Retrospektive der Stiftung Deutsche Kinemathek. Rowohlt, 1981.
- Rentschler, Eric. German Film & Literature. Routledge, 2013.
