= The Voice of the Heart (1937 film) =

1937 film directed by Karlheinz Martin

- Directed by: Karlheinz Martin
- Written by: Gerhard T. Buchholz; Gerd Tolzien
- Starring: Beniamino Gigli; Geraldine Katt; Ferdinand Marian
- Cinematography: Franz Koch
- Edited by: Elisabeth Kleinert-Neumann
- Music by: Giuseppe Becce
- Production company: Bavaria Film
- Distributed by: Bavaria Film
- Release date: 27 March 1937
- Running time: 88 minutes
- Country: Germany
- Language: German

The Voice of the Heart (German: Die Stimme des Herzens) is a 1937 German drama film directed by Karlheinz Martin and starring Beniamino Gigli, Geraldine Katt and Ferdinand Marian. It was shot at the Bavaria Studios in Munich. The film's sets were designed by the art director Max Seefelder.

== Main cast ==
- Beniamino Gigli as Gino Mari
- Geraldine Katt as Prinzessin Helene
- Ferdinand Marian as Prinz Konstantin
- Gina Falckenberg as Miss Mary Smith
- Fritz Odemar as Graf Lossez
- Gustav Waldau as Ferrat
- Hubert von Meyerinck as Kammerdiener der Prinzessin
- Hertha von Hagen as Hofdame der Prinzessin
- Amedeo Grossi as Bianchi
- Josef Eichheim as Diener
- Gerti Ober as Pianistin
- Max Weydner as Empfangschef im Hotel
- Albert Spenger as Reporter

== Bibliography ==
- Parish, James Robert. Film Actors Guide. Scarecrow Press, 1977.
