= Nights on the Road =

1952 film directed by Rudolf Jugert

- Directed by: Rudolf Jugert
- Written by: Helmut Käutner; Fritz Rotter
- Produced by: Harald Braun; Kurt Hartmann; Erich Pommer; Georg Richter
- Starring: Hans Albers; Hildegard Knef; Lucie Mannheim; Marius Goring
- Cinematography: Theo Nischwitz; Václav Vích
- Edited by: Fritz Stapenhorst
- Music by: Werner Eisbrenner
- Production companies: Bavaria Film; Intercontinental Film
- Distributed by: Deutsche Cosmopol Film
- Release date: 14 January 1952
- Running time: 112 minutes
- Country: West Germany
- Language: German

Nights on the Road (German: Nachts auf den Straßen) is a 1952 West German crime drama film directed by Rudolf Jugert and starring Hans Albers, Hildegard Knef, Marius Goring and Lucie Mannheim. It was produced by the veteran Erich Pommer who had returned to Germany after years of exile. It is one of the more prominent German film noirs. It was acclaimed by German critics on its release and was awarded a prize at the Berlin Film Festival. It was shot at the Bavaria Studios in Munich and on location in Frankfurt and various autobahns. The film's sets were designed by Rudolf Pfenninger and Ludwig Reiber. The production budget was around 900,000 deutschmarks.

== Synopsis ==
A happily married truck driver meets a much younger woman one night on the road and begins a relationship with her, which ends with him being drawn into the company of her criminal associate Kurt.

== Cast ==
- Hans Albers as Heinrich Schlueter, truck driver
- Hildegard Knef as Inge Hoffmann
- Lucie Mannheim as Anna, Schlueter's wife
- Marius Goring as Kurt Willbrandt
- Heinrich Gretler as Carl Falk, forwarder
- Gertrud Wolle as Frau Jaguweit
- Wolf Ackva as Klatte, chief of Broadway bar
- Hans Reiser as Franz
- Martin Urtel as Hans Brunnhuber
- Hans Zesch-Ballot as Inspector Busch
- Karin Andersen as Lieschen Brunnhuber, Schlueter's daughter
- Johanna König as Dancer in Broadway bar
- Margot Hielscher as Singer
- Renate Feuereisen
- Heinz Berg
- Hans Elwenspoek
- Kurt Hinz
- Hans Pössenbacher
- Maria Riffa
- Else Mental

== Bibliography ==
- Hake, Sabine. German National Cinema. Routledge, 2013.
- Hardt, Usula. From Caligari to California: Erich Pommer's Life in the International Film Wars. Berghahn Books, 1996.
- Spicer, Andrew. Historical Dictionary of Film Noir. Scarecrow Press, 2010.
