= Back Then (film) =

1943 film

- DVD cover
- Directed by: Rolf Hansen
- Written by: Bert Roth; Peter Groll; Rolf Hansen
- Produced by: Walter Bolz
- Starring: Zarah Leander; Hans Stüwe; Rossano Brazzi
- Cinematography: Franz Weihmayr
- Edited by: Anna Höllering
- Music by: Ralph Benatzky; Lothar Brühne
- Production company: UFA
- Distributed by: Deutsche Filmvertriebs
- Release date: 3 March 1943
- Running time: 94 minutes
- Country: Germany
- Language: German

Back Then (German: Damals) is a 1943 German drama film directed by Rolf Hansen and starring Zarah Leander, Hans Stüwe, and Rossano Brazzi. The film's sets were designed by Walter Haag. It was made at the Babelsberg Studio, by Universum Film AG, Germany's largest film company. It was Leander's final film of the Nazi era, as she returned to Sweden shortly afterwards. This was a blow for the German film industry, as she was the most popular and highest-paid star. Leander's next film was not for another seven years, when she made a comeback in Gabriela (1950).

== Cast ==
- Zarah Leander as Vera Meiners/Gloria O'Connor
- Hans Stüwe as Jan Meiners, Reichsanwalt
- Rossano Brazzi as Pablo, Radrennfahrer und Clown
- Jutta von Alpen as Brigitte Meiners
- Hilde Körber as Frau Gaspard, Mutter des operierten Kindes
- Elisabeth Markus as Dr. Gloria O'Connor
- Hermann Bräuer as Batejo, Manager
- Hans Brausewetter as Corbeau, Friseur
- Otto Graf as Dr. Lugeon, Chirurg
- Karl Haubenreißer as Mendoza
- Emil Heß as Alvarez, Vera's defense lawyer
- Herbert Hübner as Professor Rigaud, Klinikleiter
- Victor Janson as Kabarettdirektor
- Karl Martell as Frank Douglas, Versicherungsagent
- Giacomo Moschini as Fernandez, Marktbudenbesitzer
- Alfred Schieske as Bassist
- Erich Ziegel as Sanitätsrat Petersen
- Curt Ackermann as Etagenkellner im Hotel
- Olaf Bach as Hoteldiener Pedro Bicerkvez
- Hellmuth Bergmann as Gefängniswärter
- Peter Busse as Polizeikommissar
- Vera Complojer as Frau Januschko
- Karl Etlinger as Journalist am Tatort
- Hanne Fey as Dienstmädchen bei Meiners
- Hugo Flink as Diener bei Professor Rigaud
- Lothar Geist as Zeitungsverkäufer
- Fritz Gerlach as Zeitungsverkäufer
- Fred Goebel as Journalist
- Walter Gross as Kellner in der Hotelbar
- Knut Hartwig as Herr Januschko
- Friedrich Honna as Billardspielender Kellner in der Espresso-Bar
- Ernst Karchow as Vorsitzender der Einwanderungsbehörde
- Paul Klinger as Voice of Pablo (voice)
- Karin Luesebrink as Junge Krankenschwester
- Kurt Mikulski as Journalist
- Leo Peukert as Rasierter Kunde beim Friseur
- Hermann Pfeiffer as Nachtportier im Hotel 'Delfino'
- Gustav Püttjer as Mann auf der Bahnstation nach dem Zugunglück
- Erik Radolf as Prosecutor
- Ernst Rotmund as Leiter der Kapelle in der Hotelbar
- Hermann Sattler as Mitglied der Einwanderungsbehörde
- Just Scheu as Polizeifotograf Vigo
- Lili Schoenborn-Anspach as Emigrantenfrau in der Quarantäne
- Hans Joachim Schölermann as Bahnstationsbeamter nach dem Zugunglück
- Margarete Schön as Gast beim Abendempfang
- Walter Steinweg as Journalist
- Theodor Thony as Protokollführer of the Prosecutor
- Eva Tinschmann as Arzthelferin Fräulein Gonzales
- Margarethe von Ledebur as Oberschwester
- Agnes Windeck as Gast beim Abendempfang

== Bibliography ==
- O'Brien, Mary-Elizabeth (2006) [2004]. Nazi Cinema as Enchantment: The Politics of Entertainment in the Third Reich. Rochester, NY: Boydell & Brewer. ISBN 978-1-57113-334-2.
