= Waldemar Leitgeb =

- Born: 14 September 1901; Constantinople, Ottoman Empire
- Died: 21 July 1974 (aged 72); Karlsruhe, Baden-Württemberg, West Germany
- Occupation: Actor
- Years active: 1935-1965 (film & TV)

Waldemar Leitgeb (14 September 1901 – 21 July 1974) was a German stage actor and director, who was born in Turkey where his father was then employed. He also appeared in a number of films such including Sky Hounds.

== Selected filmography ==
- The Green Domino (1935) as Dr. Nohl
- Tango Notturno (1937) as Officer Lincoln
- A Prussian Love Story (1938) as Prince Nicholas of Russia
- Between River and Steppe (1939) as Stefan
- The Rothschilds (1940) as Lord Wellington
- Sky Hounds (1942) as Lieutenant Colonel Hauff
- Münchhausen (1943) as Prince Grigorij Orlow
- Dunja (1955) as Prince Wlow

== Bibliography ==
- Richards, Jeffrey. Visions of Yesterday. Routledge & Kegan Paul, 1973.
