= Dunja (film) =

1955 film

- Directed by: Josef von Báky
- Written by: Emil Burri; Johannes Mario Simmel
- Based on: The Station Master by Alexander Pushkin
- Produced by: Herbert Gruber
- Starring: Eva Bartok; Karlheinz Böhm; Ivan Desny
- Cinematography: Günther Anders; Hannes Staudinger
- Edited by: Herma Sandtner
- Music by: Alois Melichar
- Production company: Sascha Film
- Distributed by: Herzog Film
- Release date: 22 December 1955
- Running time: 95 minutes
- Country: Austria
- Language: German

Dunja is a 1955 Austrian historical drama film directed by Josef von Báky and starring Eva Bartok, Karlheinz Böhm, Ivan Desny and Walter Richter. It is an adaptation of the short story The Station Master by Alexander Pushkin, which had previously been made into the 1940 film Der Postmeister by Gustav Ucicky.

It was shot at the Sievering and Rosenhügel Studios in Vienna and on location in Burgenland. The film's sets were designed by the art director Fritz Maurischat.

== Cast ==
- Eva Bartok as Dunja
- Ivan Desny as Minski
- Karlheinz Böhm as Mitja
- Walter Richter as Postmeister
- Maria Litto as Mascha
- Eva Zilcher as Elisabeth
- Otto Wögerer as Serjej
- Ernst Jäger as Oseip
- Lotte Medelsky as alte Frau
- Waldemar Leitgeb as Fürst Wlow
- Hannes Schiel as Alexej
- Bruno Dallansky as Pjotr
- Otto Schenk as Sascha
- Ernst Meister as 1. Fähnrich
- Jörg Liebenfels as 2. Fähnrich
- Georg Hartmann as Hausmeister
- Kurt Müller-Böck as Stephan, Offizier
- Peter Sparovitz as Knecht

== Bibliography ==
- Fritsche, Maria. Homemade Men In Postwar Austrian Cinema: Nationhood, Genre and Masculinity . Berghahn Books, 2013.
