= Albert Lippert =

German actor

Albert Lippert (1901-1978) was a German stage, television and film actor. He was the manager of the Deutsches Schauspielhaus between 1948 and 1955.

== Selected filmography ==
- Cruiser Emden (1932) as the "Emden" officer
- Schlußakkord (1936) as Gregor Carl-Otto
- A Prussian Love Story (1938) as Prince Gustav of Sweden
- Liberated Hands (1939) as Van Daalen
- Police Report (1939) as Harry Hornemann
- Alarm at Station III (1939) as Hendrik
- Twilight (1940) as Commissioner Hagenbach
- The Rothschilds (1940) as James Rothschild
- The Girl from Barnhelm (1940) as Prince Heinrich
- The Red Terror (1942) as the Kovno Hotel director
- Doctor Crippen (1942) as the guest
- Tonelli (1943) as the commissioner
- Germanin (1943) as Colonel Crosby
- Orient Express (1944) as Franko
- Percy Stuart (1969) as General William McLean
