= Theo Nischwitz =

German cinematographer and special effects expert

- Born: 27 April 1913; Berlin, German Empire
- Died: 14 July 1994; Munich, Germany
- Occupation(s): Cinematographer; Special effects

Theo Nischwitz (1913–1994) was a German cinematographer and special effects expert. Following the Second World War he was head of special effects at the Munich-based Bavaria Film. He was married to the film editor Gertrud Hinz.

== Selected filmography ==
=== Cinematographer ===
- The Crew of the Dora (1943)
- Nights on the Road (1952)

=== Special effects ===
- Bombs on Monte Carlo (1931)
- F.P.1 (1933)
- Amphitryon (1935)
- The Adventures of Baron Munchausen (1943)
- Wherever the Trains Travel (1949)
- The Haunted Castle (1960)

== Bibliography ==
- Giesen, Rolf & Storm J.P. Animation Under the Swastika: A History of Trickfilm in Nazi Germany, 1933-1945. McFarland, 2012.
