= Lola Müthel =

German actress

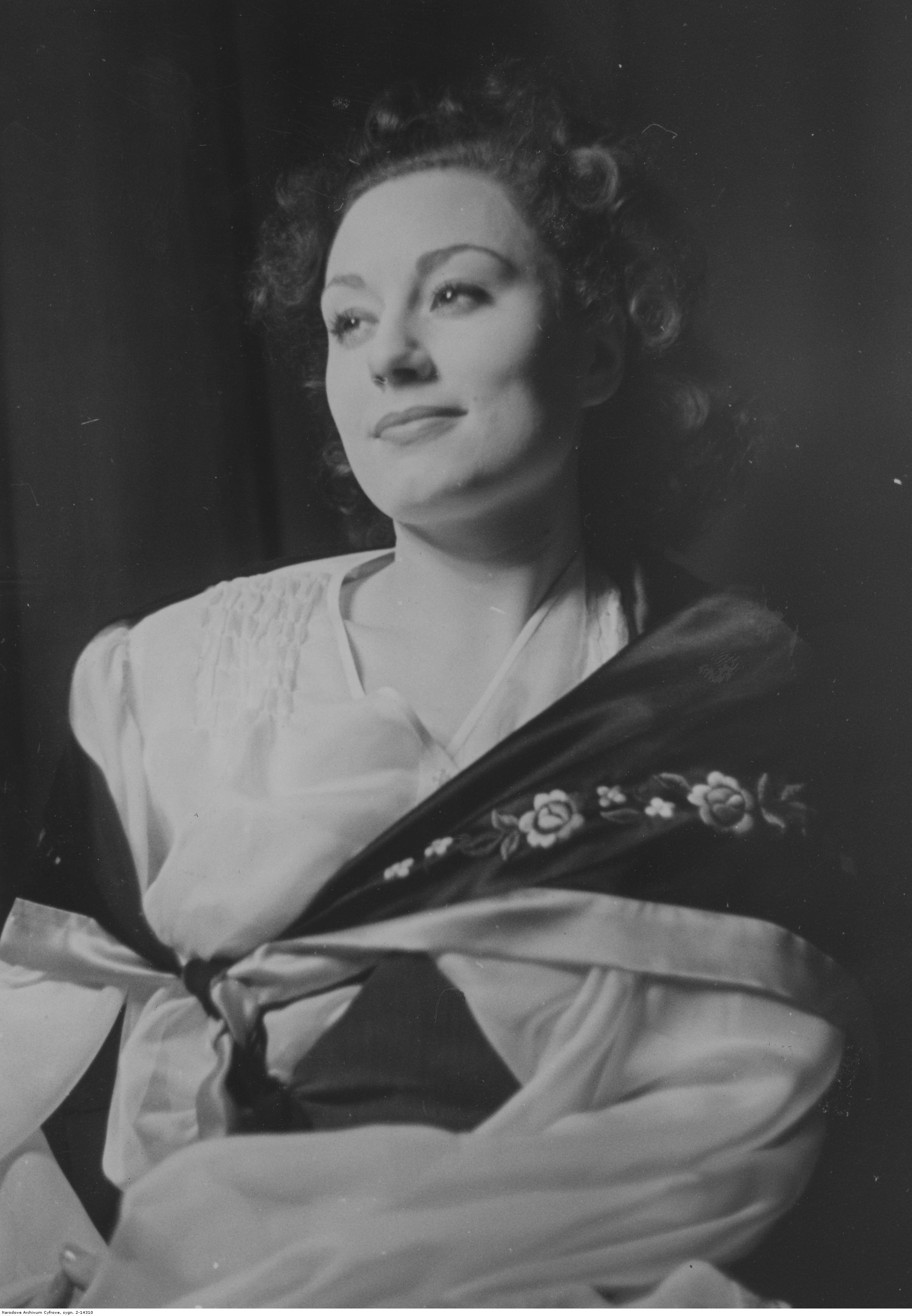
- Müthel in 1940
- Born: 9 March 1919; Darmstadt, Germany
- Died: 11 December 2011 (aged 92); Gräfelfing, Bavaria, Germany
- Other name: Lola Lütcke
- Occupation: Actress
- Years active: 1939–2005 (film & TV)
- Spouse: Eric Helgar

Lola Müthel (1919–2011) was a German stage, film and television actress. She was married to the singer Eric Helgar and following their divorce, to the actor Hans Caninenberg.

== Selected filmography ==
- Police Report (1939)
- A Man with Principles? (1943)
- Heart's Desire (1951)
- Hotel Adlon (1955)
- Roses in Autumn (1955)
- One Woman Is Not Enough? (1955)
- The Juvenile Judge (1960)
- From the Life of the Marionettes (1980)

== Bibliography ==
- Goble, Alan (1999). The Complete Index to Literary Sources in Film. Berlin: Walter de Gruyter. ISBN 978-3-11-095194-3.
