= Lothar Brühne =

German composer (1900–1958)

- Born: 19 July 1900; Berlin, German Empire
- Died: 14 December 1958 (aged 58); Munich, West Germany
- Occupation: Composer
- Years active: 1933–1958

Lothar Brühne (19 July 1900 – 14 December 1958) was a German composer of film scores.

== Selected filmography ==
- Lady Killer (1937)
- Diamonds (1937)
- La Habanera (1937)
- S.O.S. Sahara (1938)
- The Night of Decision (1938)
- The Blue Fox (1938)
- Five Million Look for an Heir (1938)
- Night of Fate (1938)
- Liberated Hands (1939)
- Der Stammbaum des Dr. Pistorius (1939)
- A Woman Like You (1939)
- Enemies (1940)
- What Does Brigitte Want? (1941)
- Beloved World (1942)
- Back Then (1943)
- Romance in a Minor Key (1943)
- Tonelli (1943)
- Come Back to Me (1944)
- Orient Express (1944)
- Long Is the Road (1948)
- The Lost Face (1948)
- Regimental Music (1950)
- The Man Who Wanted to Live Twice (1950)
- Thirteen Under One Hat (1950)
- Heart's Desire (1951)
- The Exchange (1952)
- Unter den Sternen von Capri (1953)
- I and You (1953)
- Regina Amstetten (1954)
- The Angel with the Flaming Sword (1954)
- Spring Song (1954)
