= Eric Helgar =

German singer and actor

- Born: 8 February 1910; Regensburg, German Empire
- Died: 14 June 1992 (aged 82); Berlin, Germany
- Occupations: Actor, singer
- Years active: 1933–1969 (film)
- Spouse: Lola Müthel

Eric Helgar (8 February 1910 – 14 June 1992) was a German singer and film actor. He was married to the actress Lola Müthel.

== Selected filmography ==
- What Women Dream (1933)
- The Champion of Pontresina (1934)
- Orders Are Orders (1936)
- The Green Emperor (1939)
- A Woman Like You (1939)
- Friedemann Bach (1941)
- Romance in a Minor Key (1943)

== Bibliography ==
- Goble, Alan. The Complete Index to Literary Sources in Film. Walter de Gruyter, 1999.
