= Ernst Rotmund =

German actor

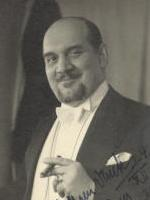
- Born: 26 November 1886; Thorn, German Empire
- Died: 2 March 1955 (aged 68); Munich, West Germany
- Occupation: Actor
- Years active: 1917–1954

Ernst Rotmund (26 November 1886 – 2 March 1955) was a German actor. He appeared in more than one hundred films from 1917 to 1954.

== Selected filmography ==
Year	Title	Role	Notes
1954	The Missing Miniature		
1953	Jonny Saves Nebrador		
1951	Shadows Over Naples		
1949	The Murder Trial of Doctor Jordan		
1948	Street Acquaintances		
1943	I Entrust My Wife to You		
1943	Back Then		
1942	Wedding in Barenhof		
1942	Andreas Schlüter		
1942	My Wife Theresa		
1942	Much Ado About Nixi		
1941	The Swedish Nightingale		
1941	The Way to Freedom		
1941	Riding for Germany		
1940	The Star of Rio		
1940	Twilight		
1939	A Woman Like You		
1939	Hello Janine!		
1939	Water for Canitoga		
1939	We Danced Around the World		
1938	Shadows Over St. Pauli		
1938	Rubber		
1938	Covered Tracks		
1937	Crooks in Tails		
1937	An Enemy of the People		
1937	The Hound of the Baskervilles		
1936	Victoria in Dover		
1936	Augustus the Strong		
1935	Don't Lose Heart, Suzanne!		
1935	The Man with the Paw		
1935	Knockout		
1933	Hitlerjunge Quex		
1929	Napoleon at Saint Helena		
1928	The Prince of Rogues		
1921	Wandering Souls		
1920	The Mayor of Zalamea		
