= Paracelsus (film) =

1943 film

- Directed by: G. W. Pabst
- Written by: Kurt Heuser
- Based on: Der König der Ärzte by Pert Peternel
- Produced by: Fred Lyssa for Bavaria Filmkunst GmbH
- Starring: Werner Krauss
- Cinematography: Bruno Stephan
- Edited by: Lena Neumann
- Music by: Herbert Windt
- Production company: Bavaria Film
- Distributed by: Deutsche Filmvertriebe
- Release date: 12 March 1943
- Running time: 104 minutes
- Country: Nazi Germany
- Language: German

Paracelsus is a 1943 German drama film directed by G. W. Pabst, based on the life of the 16th-century physician Paracelsus.

== Cast ==
- Werner Krauss as Paracelsus
- Annelies Reinhold as Renata Pfefferkorn
- Harry Langewisch as Pfefferkorn
- Mathias Wieman as Ulrich von Hutten
- Fritz Rasp as Magister
- Martin Urtel as Johannes
- Herbert Hübner as Count von Hohenreid
- Josef Sieber as Bilse, Paracelsus's servant
- Rudolf Blümner as Froben
- Harald Kreutzberg as Fliegenbein
- Hilde Sessak as Waitress
- Franz Schafheitlin as Erasmus von Rotterdam
- Victor Janson as Mayor
- Karl Skraup as Surgeon
- Erich Dunskus as Innkeeper
