= Orient Express (1944 film) =

1944 German thriller film

- Directed by: Viktor Tourjansky
- Written by: Peter Groll; Emil Burri; Viktor Tourjansky
- Produced by: Georg Witt; Fritz Hippler
- Starring: Siegfried Breuer; Gusti Wolf; Rudolf Prack
- Cinematography: Franz Koch
- Music by: Lothar Brühne
- Production company: Bavaria Film
- Distributed by: Deutsche Filmvertriebs
- Release date: 1 December 1944
- Running time: 84 minutes
- Country: Germany
- Language: German

Orient Express (German: Orient-Express) is a 1944 German thriller film directed by Viktor Tourjansky and starring Siegfried Breuer, Gusti Wolf and Rudolf Prack. It was shot at the Bavaria Studios in Munich. The film's sets were designed by the art director Ludwig Reiber.

== Synopsis ==
As the Orient Express hurtles through the Balkans, a loud scream is heard and the communication cord is pulled. The guard investigates and discovers a dead man in one of the compartments. Police from the nearest town arrive to investigate. It seems most of the passengers are suspicious.

== Cast ==
- Siegfried Breuer as Baron Erich Hübner
- Gusti Wolf as Sonja Promshek
- Rudolf Prack as Franz Schulz
- Lisa Siebel as Frau Dr. Inge Geldern
- Paul Dahlke as Police Commisar Iwanowitsch
- Oskar Sima as Mischa Kowa, reporter
- Joseph Offenbach as Inspector Kosta Balaban
- Hilde Sessak as Vera Voneitz, aka Vera Pamalet
- Lotte Lang as Mizzi Treff
- Nicolas Koline as Der Schlafwagenschaffner
- Heini Handschumacher as Holzer, private detective
- Albert Lippert as Franko, lawyer
- Tibor Halmay as Jango
- Georg Vogelsang as Anton Brukenhauser
- Viktor Afritsch as Garwinsky
- Walther Jung as Die Excellenz

== Bibliography ==
- Wiesenthal, Mauricio. The belle époque of the Orient-Express. Crescent Books, 1979.
