= Um das Menschenrecht =

1934 Nazi propaganda film

- Directed by: Hans Zöberlein; Ludwig Schmid-Wildy
- Written by: Hans Zöberlein (manuscript and screenplay)
- Produced by: Hans Zöberlein (executive producer)
- Starring: See below
- Cinematography: Ludwig Zahn
- Release date: 1934
- Country: Germany
- Language: German

Um das Menschenrecht is a 1934 Nazi propaganda film directed by Hans Zöberlein and Ludwig Schmid-Wildy.

== Cast ==
- Hans Schlenck as Hans, Frontkamerad
- Kurt Holm as Fritz, Frontkamerad
- Ernst Martens as Max, Frontkamerad
- Beppo Brem as Girgl, Frontkamerad
- Ludwig Ten Cloot as der Hauptmann
- Hans Erich Pfleger as Paul, Freikorpskamerad
- Paul Schaidler as Christian, Freikorpskamerad
- Franz Loskarn as Höllein, Freikorpskamerad
- Leopold Kerscher as Martin, Freikorpskamerad
- Werner Scharf as Anführer der Roten
- Trude Haefelin as Petratka, politische Agentin
- Katja Specht as Natascha, politische Agentin
- Ludwig Körösy as ein Unterführer
- Hans Pössenbacher as a Spartacist
- Ludwig Schmid-Wildy as der alte Krafft
- Lydia Alexandra as Berta Schön, Wirtstochter
- Rose Kugler as Girgl's wife
- Hilde Horst as Fritz's wife
