= Prague German Opera =

Prague German Opera may refer to:

- Deutsches Landestheater, today's Estates Theatre in Prague
- Neues Deutsches Landestheater, today's State Opera in Prague
