= Deutsches Theater (Oslo) =

Theater in Oslo, Norway

Coordinates: 59°54′48″N 10°44′09″E

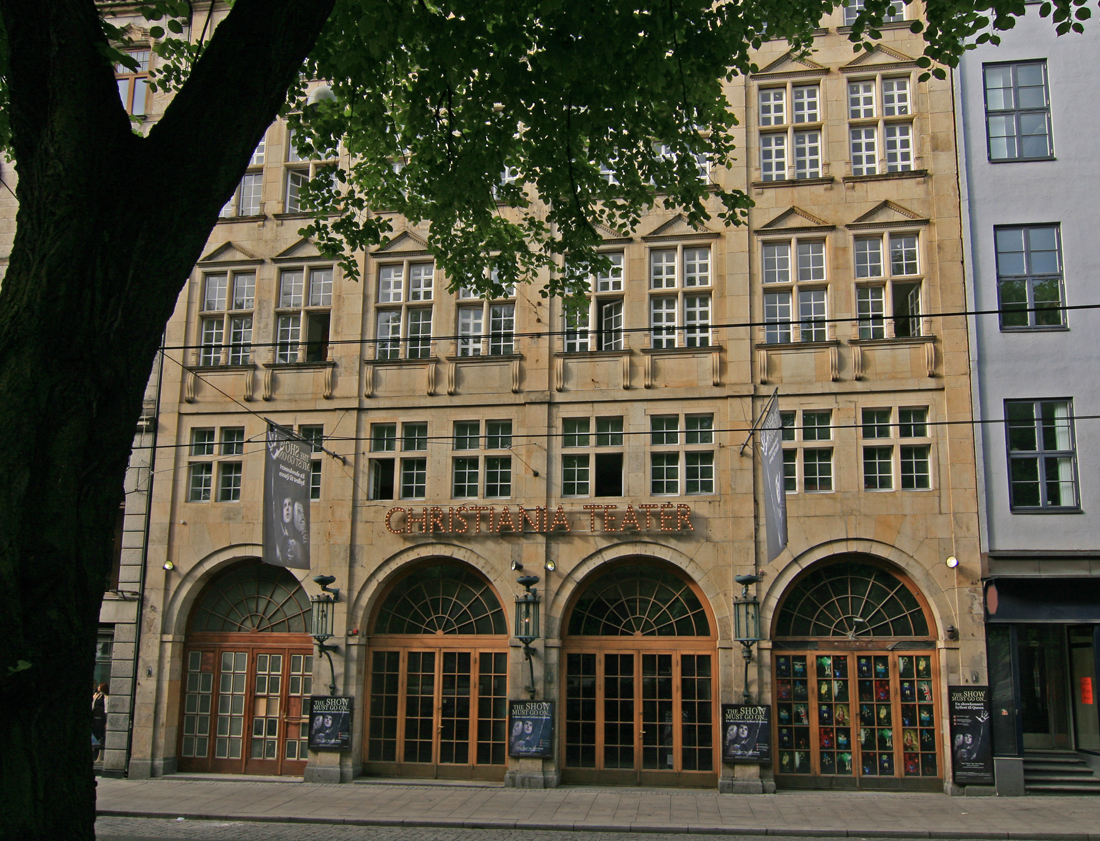
Stortingsgata 16, the building in which the Deutsches Theater was housed

Deutsches Theater was a German-language theater in Oslo, Norway which existed between 1941 and 1944, during the German occupation of Norway.

It was established on 1 January 1941 following an order from Josef Terboven, and the first performance was held on 22 April 1941 in Nationaltheatret. It later moved to new localities, in Stortingsgata 16. Its premiere performance, the operetta The Land of Smiles by Franz Lehár, was held on 7 June the same year. The theatre closed in September 1944 because the resources needed to be channeled elsewhere in the German war machine.

== See also ==
- Deutsches Theater, Berlin
