= Hermann Asmus =

- Born: 23 February 1887; Berlin, German Empire
- Died: 29 January 1968 (aged 80); Bergholz-Rehbrücke, Brandenburg, East Germany
- Occupation: Art director
- Years active: 1936-1962 (film)

Hermann Asmus (1887–1968) was a German art director.

== Selected filmography ==
- The Haunted Castle (1936)
- When Women Keep Silent (1937)
- Lady Killer (1937)
- What Now, Sibylle? (1938)
- Kora Terry (1940)
- Twilight (1940)
- Andreas Schlüter (1942)
- Sky Hounds (1942)
- Melody of a Great City (1943)
- The Black Robe (1944)
- Das Mädchen Christine (1949)
- The Marriage of Figaro (1949)
- Heart of Stone (1950)
- The Sailor's Song (1958)

== Bibliography ==
- Giesen, Rolf. Nazi Propaganda Films: A History and Filmography. McFarland, 2003.
