= Hostivař Studios =

Film studios in Prague

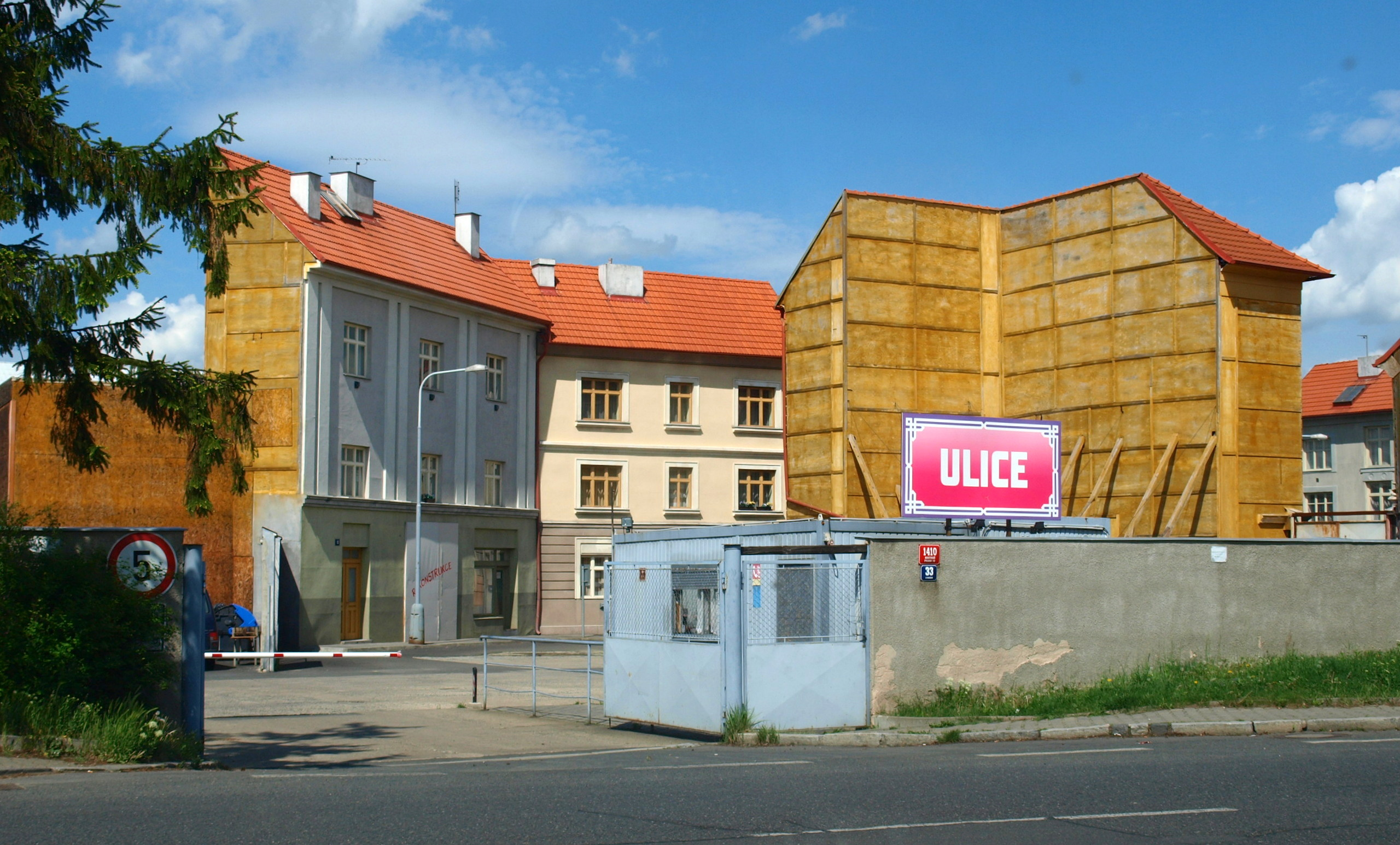
A set for the TV show Ulice in Hostivař Studios

The Hostivař Studios (Czech: Ateliéry Hostivař) are film studios located in the Hostivař district in Prague, Czech Republic. Founded in 1934, the studios cover an area of about 20,000 square metres.

== History ==
Businessman Karel Krečmer built a complex of bakeries and a steam mill in 1921. He sold the pastry under the name Host. The company went bankrupt in 1924 and the stake-holders sold the complex which was then rebuilt as a film studio with three sound stages, a film laboratory, a restaurant and a hotel. The first productions shot in the studio were commercials for Baťa shoes company in 1934. Jan Antonín Baťa rented the studios in 1937 with a plan to make feature films. However, the plan was never realized, because in 1939 the World War II broke out and Baťa left the country.

During the Nazi Occupation of Czechoslovakia from 1939 to 1945, the Nazis used Barrandov Studios to make their movies, so any Czech films could only be filmed in the smaller Hostivař Studios. A Nazi controlled company Prag-film acquired the studios and merged them with Barrandov Studios in 1943. Some movies shot during the war were Grandmother, Muzikantská Liduška, Pantáta Bezoušek or Turbina. Following the war, the studios stayed part of the Barrandov company in the nationalised Czechoslovak film industry.

In 1945 a large part of the ateliers were damaged by fire, but they were rebuilt. In the post-war era films like Journey to the Beginning of Time, Higher Principle, The End of Agent W4C or Ecce homo Homolka were shot here.

In the 21st century, the studios are used mostly to film TV shows like Ulice, Ordinace v růžové zahradě, Comeback, Velmi křehké vztahy, Doktoři z Počátků, or the Czech version of the MasterChef reality show.
