= Gloria-Palast =

Coordinates: 52°30′16″N 13°20′00″E

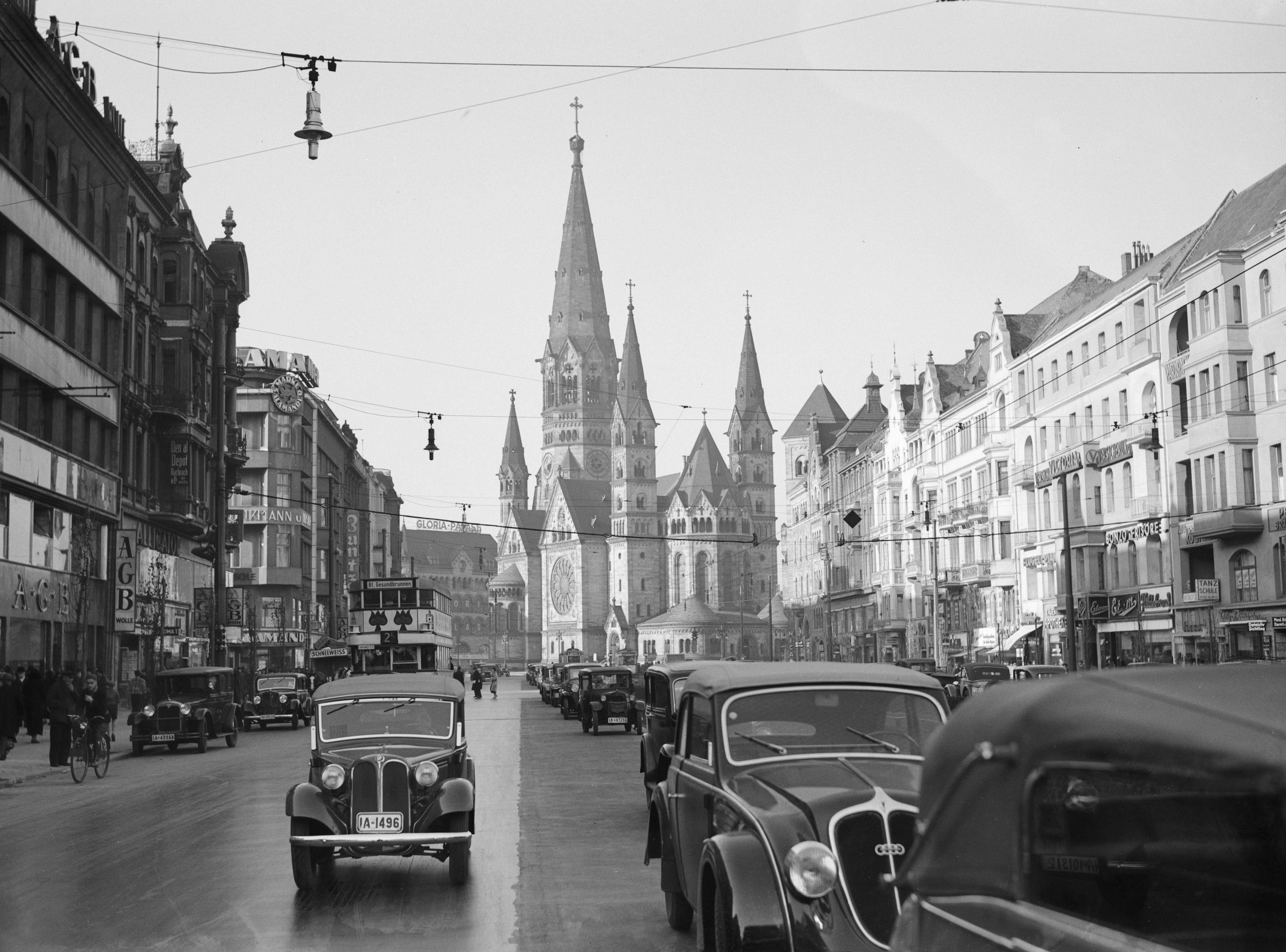
A view of the Kurfürstendamm in 1935 with the cinema located amongst other entertainment venues.

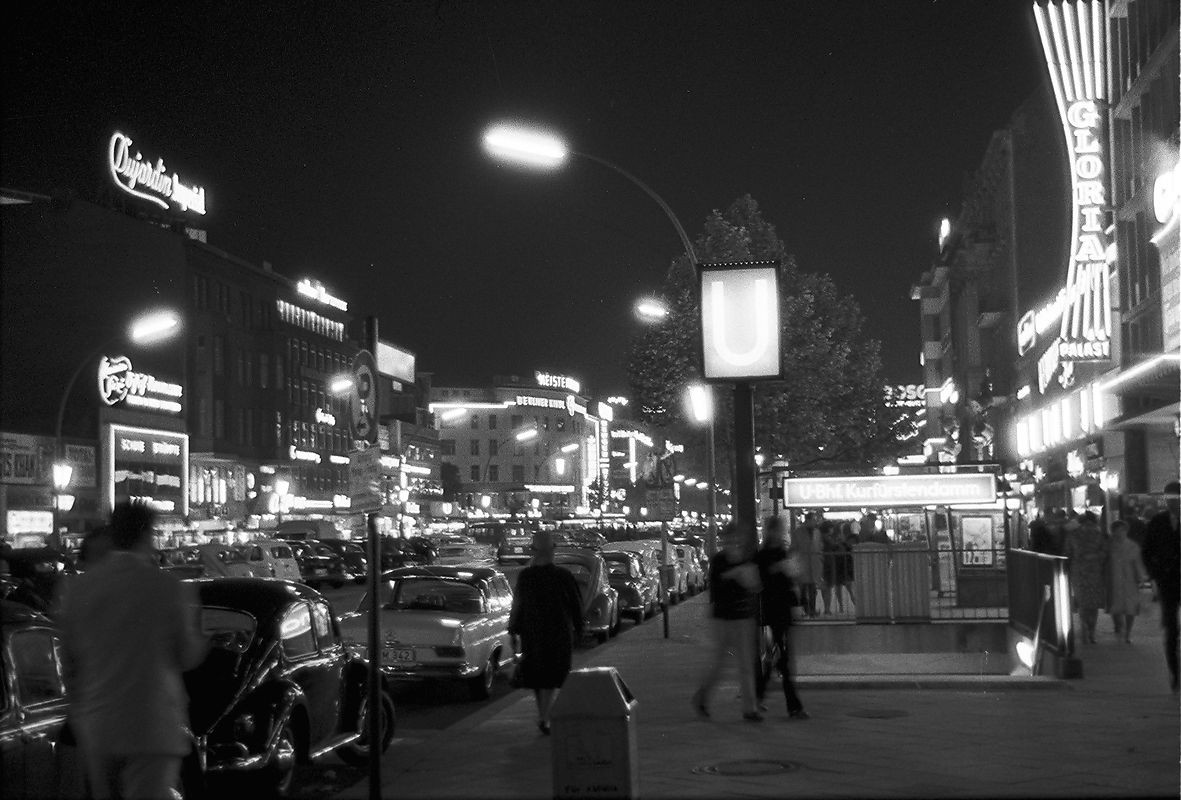
The Gloria-Palast on the right of the shot in 1965.

The Gloria-Palast was a German cinema located on the Kurfürstendamm in the German capital Berlin. It was constructed in 1924 and replaced the existing neo-Baroque Romanischen Hauses designed by Franz Heinrich Schwechten. It became a common location for Berlin premieres of new films. In 1930 the hit The Blue Angel first screened at the Palast. In 1943 the cinema was gutted by a fire caused by an Allied bombing raid during the Second World War. After the war, the cinema was refurbished and reopened in what was now West Berlin during the Cold War. Other prestige cinemas located in the area included the Marmorhaus. In 2017 the redevelopment of the cinema was approved and it was demolished the following year.

== Bibliography ==
- Zitzlsperger, Ulrike. Historical Dictionary of Berlin. Rowman & Littlefield, 2021.
