= The Heath Is Green =

The Heath Is Green may refer to:

- The Heath Is Green (1932 film), a German musical film
- The Heath Is Green (1951 film), a German drama film
- The Heath Is Green (1972 film), a German remake
