= The Gypsy Baron (disambiguation) =

The Gypsy Baron is an 1885 operetta by Johann Strauss II.

The Gypsy Baron may also refer to several films, including:

- The Gypsy Baron (1927 film), a German silent film directed by Frederic Zelnik
- The Gypsy Baron (1935 film), a German film directed by Karl Hartl
- The Gypsy Baron (1954 film), a West German film directed by Arthur Maria Rabenalt
- The Gypsy Baron (1962 film), a French-West German film directed by Kurt Wilhelm
