= When the Evening Bells Ring (1951 film) =

1951 film

- Directed by: Alfred Braun
- Written by: Hans Scheffel; Werner P. Zibaso
- Produced by: Willie Hoffmann-Andersen
- Starring: Willy Birgel; Maria Holst; Paul Hörbiger; Hans Holt
- Cinematography: Georg Krause
- Edited by: Erwin Marno
- Music by: Willy Schmidt-Gentner
- Production company: Apollo-Film
- Distributed by: Gloria Film
- Release date: 21 December 1951
- Running time: 88 minutes
- Country: West Germany
- Language: German

When the Evening Bells Ring (German: Wenn die Abendglocken läuten) is a 1951 West German drama film directed by Alfred Braun and starring Willy Birgel, Maria Holst and Paul Hörbiger. It was shot at the Tempelhof Studios in West Berlin with sets designed by the art director Gabriel Pellon. It is unrelated to the 1930 silent film of the same title.

== Cast ==
- Willy Birgel as Albrecht von Finke
- Maria Holst as Gloria Römer
- Paul Hörbiger as Lehrer Storm
- Hans Holt as Michael
- Julia Fjorsen as Rosemarie
- Käthe Haack as Frau Brenda
- Peter Voß as Gutsherr von Brenda
- Rudolf Platte
- Hilde Körber
- Alfred Braun
- Aribert Wäscher
- Hilde Sessak
- Otto Gebühr

== Bibliography ==
- Hake, Sabine. Popular Cinema of the Third Reich. University of Texas Press, 2001.
