= Waldmüller =

Waldmüller is a German surname. Notable people with the surname include:

- Ferdinand Georg Waldmüller (1793–1865), Austrian painter
- Hans Waldmüller (1912–1944), German soldier
- Lizzi Waldmüller (1904–1945), Austrian actress and singer
