= Hans Fidesser =

Austrian actor, singer and opera singer

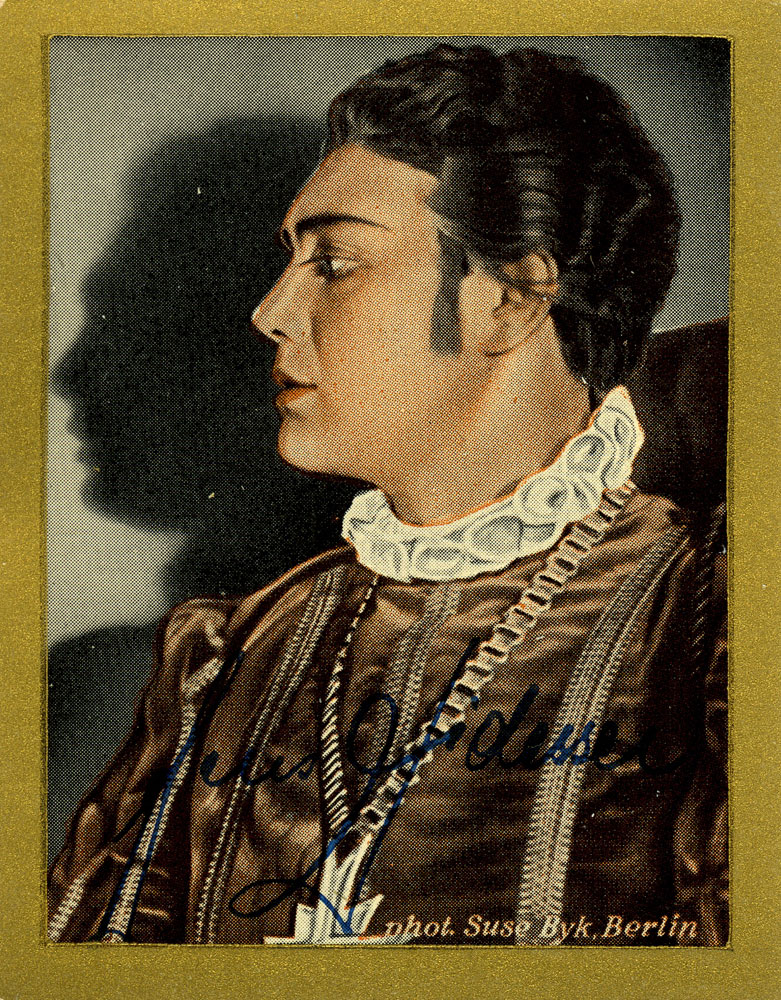
- Hans Fidesser adorned with necklace
- Born: 12 March 1899; Vienna, Austro Hungarian Empire
- Died: 22 January 1982 (aged 82); Berlin, Germany
- Occupations: Singer, actor
- Years active: 1933–1953 (film)

Hans Fidesser (12 March 1899 – 22 January 1982) was an Austrian tenor and film actor. A lyric tenor, he recorded popular songs on the Parlophone record label and was particularly celebrated on the stage for his performances in the operas of Wolfgang Amadeus Mozart.

== Early life and career ==
Hans Fidesser was born in Vienna, Austria on 12 March 1899. He originally trained as a baritone under E. Mauck, and made his professional opera debut singing that repertoire at the Theater Plauen-Zwickau in 1922. He worked as a baritone at the Mannheim National Theatre from 1924 to 1926. He then retrained his voice as a tenor through studies with tenor Laurenz Hofer.

== Tenor ==
Fidesser made his stage debut as a tenor at the Opernhaus Wuppertal as Radamès in Verdi's Aida in 1926. He went on to perform a variety of tenor roles in opera houses throughout Europe; among them Adolar in Weber's Euryanthe, Cavaradossi in Puccini's Tosca, Des Grieux in Massenet's Manon, Don José in Bizet's Carmen, Don Ottavio in Mozart's Don Giovanni', the Duke of Mantua in Verdi's Rigoletto, Julien in Charpentier's Louise, Lukas in Smetana's The Kiss, Max in Der Freischütz, and the title roles in Offenbach's The Tales of Hoffmann and Wagner's Lohengrin.

Fidesser was a resident tenor at Berlin's Kroll Opera House from 1927 through 1931 where he had success in several production mounted by Otto Klemperer. There he excelled in the role of Florestan in Beethoven's Fidelio (1927) He concurrently worked frequently as a guest artist at other theaters in that city, including the Berlin State Opera (BSO) and the Deutsche Oper Berlin. He became a member of the latter theatre after leaving his position at the Kroll Opera House; singing at the Deutsche Oper Berlin as a principal tenor until 1939. In 1928 he performed in the world premiere of Julius Bittner's Die Mondnacht at the BSO.

At the Vienna State Opera, Fidesser appeared often as a guest in the year 1929–1931. In 1931 he performed the role of Tamino in Mozart's The Magic Flute at the Salzburg Festival. In 1934 he performed with the Dutch National Opera as Belmonte in Mozart's The Abduction from the Seraglio, and also appeared as a soloist at the Paris Opera and the Royal Swedish Opera. Other roles in his repertoire included the Officer in Hindemith's Cardillac, Pelléas in Debussy's Pelléas et Mélisande, and the Stranger in Korngold's Das Wunder der Heliane.

He remained active as an opera and concert tenor in the year following World War II, but in the mid-1950s reoriented his career toward teaching singing. He remained active as a voice teacher in Berlin late into his life.

== Film career ==
Fidesser began working as a film actor in the 1930s. His film credits included The Flower of Hawaii (1933), Everything for Gloria (1941), The Wedding Hotel (1944), In the Temple of Venus (1948), and Father Is Being Stupid (1953).

== Later life ==
Fidesser remained active as an opera and concert tenor in the year following World War II, but in the mid-1950s reoriented his career toward teaching singing. He remained active as a voice teacher in Berlin late into his life.

Fidesser died in Berlin on 22 January 1982.
