= A Man Like Maximilian =

1945 film

- Directed by: Hans Deppe
- Written by: Axel Eggebrecht; Resi Flierl; Peter Francke
- Produced by: Fred Lyssa
- Starring: Wolf Albach-Retty; Karin Hardt; Lizzi Waldmüller
- Cinematography: Erich Claunigk
- Edited by: Erich Palme
- Music by: Michael Jary
- Production company: Bavaria Film
- Distributed by: Deutsche Filmvertriebs
- Release date: 13 March 1945
- Running time: 88 minutes
- Country: Germany
- Language: German

A Man Like Maximilian (German: Ein Mann wie Maximilian) is a 1945 German comedy film directed by Hans Deppe and starring Wolf Albach-Retty, Karin Hardt and Lizzi Waldmüller. It was one of the last films released during the Third Reich and was playing in cinemas during the Battle of Berlin. It was shot at the Hostivar Studios in Prague. The film's sets were designed by the art directors Franz Bi and Bruno Lutz.

== Synopsis ==
When her daughter becomes engaged to a respectable lawyer, her mother is delighted as she sees the fiancée as being like her own husband Maximilian. However, suspicions begin to arise that he may be concealing a secret from them.

== Cast ==
- Wolf Albach-Retty as Doctor Thomas Hesse
- Karin Hardt as Monika, dessen Frau
- Lizzi Waldmüller as Alexandra Durran, Sängerin
- Fritz Odemar as Maximilian Holten
- Hermine Ziegler as Fränze Holten
- Norbert Rohringer as Fips Holten
- Max Gülstorff as Heinrich Holten
- Paul Dahlke as Theaterdirektor Rother
- Hannes Keppler as Carol Witt, Tenor
- Auguste Pünkösdy as Frau Durran
- Victor Janson as Theaterdirektor
- Angelo Ferrari as Regisseur
- Emmy Flemmich as Frau Meier
- Rosemarie Grosser as Frl. Behr, Sekretärin
- Emil Reissner as Bühnenportier
- Emilie Bösl as Josefa, Magd
- Karl Neumayer as Briefträger
- Ina Albrecht as Loni, Hausmädchen

== Bibliography ==
- Bock, Hans-Michael & Bergfelder, Tim. The Concise CineGraph. Encyclopedia of German Cinema. Berghahn Books, 2009.
