= Fritz Peter Buch =

German screenwriter and film director

- Born: 21 December 1894; Frankfurt an der Oder, German Empire
- Died: 6 November 1964 (aged 69); Vienna, Austria
- Occupations: Director; Screenwriter
- Years active: 1935–1956 (film)

Fritz Peter Buch (21 December 1894 – 6 November 1964) was a German screenwriter and film director. He worked frequently during the Nazi period, with one of his plays, Einmal Mensch (Once a Person) being performed by the German unit in NYC of the Federal Theatre Project; Buch worked less in the post-war years. He directed Zarah Leander in one of her comeback films Cuba Cabana (1952), in what proved to be his final directorial effort.

== Selected filmography ==
=== Director ===
- Winter in the Woods (1936)
- The Citadel of Warsaw (1937)
- The Deruga Case (1938)
- Detours to Happiness (1939)
- Jakko (1941)
- People in the Storm (1941)
- My Summer Companion (1943)
- The Black Robe (1944)
- Cuba Cabana (1952)

=== Screenwriter ===
- Sophienlund (1943)
- A Very Big Child (1952)
- Engagement at Wolfgangsee (1956)

=== Playwright ===
- Einmal Mensch (1936–37)

== Bibliography ==
- Goble, Alan. The Complete Index to Literary Sources in Film. Walter de Gruyter, 1999.
