= A Heart Returns Home =

1956 film directed by Eugen York

- Directed by: Eugen York
- Written by: Kurt E. Walter
- Produced by: Walter Koppel; Gyula Trebitsch
- Starring: Maximilian Schell; Willy Birgel; Maria Holst
- Cinematography: Albert Benitz
- Edited by: Ira Oberberg
- Music by: Wolfgang Zeller
- Production company: Real Film
- Distributed by: Europa-Filmverleih
- Release date: 26 October 1956
- Running time: 90 minutes
- Country: West Germany
- Language: German

A Heart Returns Home (German: Ein Herz kehrt heim) is a 1956 West German musical drama film directed by Eugen York and starring Maximilian Schell, Willy Birgel and Maria Holst. It was shot at the Wandsbek Studios in Hamburg and on location in Celle. The film's sets were designed by the art directors Albrecht Becker and Herbert Kirchhoff.

== Cast ==
- Maximilian Schell as Wolfgang Thomas
- Willy Birgel as Robert Lennart
- Maria Holst as Irene Thomas
- Hans Nielsen as Martin Thomas
- Erni Mangold as Maxie Mell
- Heinz Reincke as Besselmann
- Horst Beck as Journalist
- Hildegard Behrens-Kühn as Fräulein Kurtz
- Josef Dahmen as Dr. Brandel
- Erich Dunskus as Weber
- Sylvia Fitzen
- Albert Florath as Bürgermeister von Neuburg
- Horst Gnekow as Mangelsdorf
- Ursula Herking as Fräulein Snyder
- Hertha Martin as Sylvia Hartung
- Emmy Percy-Wüstenhagen as Gertrud
- Charles Regnier as Boerner
- Ellen Roedler
- Siegfried Schürenberg as Dr. Weißbach
- Horst von Otto as Fenske
- Brigitte Wentzel

== Bibliography ==
- Parish, James Robert. Film Actors Guide: Western Europe. Scarecrow Press, 1977.
