= In the Temple of Venus =

1948 film

- Directed by: Hans H. Zerlett
- Written by: Curt J. Braun (play); Hans H. Zerlett
- Produced by: Erich Palme
- Starring: Olga Chekhova; Willy Birgel; Hermann Speelmans
- Cinematography: Heinz Schnackertz
- Edited by: Erich Palme
- Music by: Leo Leux
- Production company: Bavaria Film
- Distributed by: Amerikanischer Allgemeiner Filmverleih
- Release date: 27 February 1948
- Running time: 91 minutes
- Country: Germany
- Language: German

In the Temple of Venus (German: Im Tempel der Venus) is a 1948 German drama film directed by Hans H. Zerlett and starring Olga Chekhova, Willy Birgel, and Hermann Speelmans. The film was originally produced during the final stages of the Second World War in 1945, but was not given a release until three years later.

The film's sets were designed by the art directors Franz Bi and Bruno Lutz. It was shot at the Bavaria Studios in Munich.

== Cast ==
- Olga Chekhova as Carola Weber
- Willy Birgel as Dr. Cornelius Riehl
- Hermann Speelmans as Kai Brodersen
- Olly Holzmann as Brigitte Voß
- Friedrich Domin as Richard Doysen
- Erika von Thellmann as Frau Dingeldey
- Hubert von Meyerinck as Raimondo
- Hans Fidesser as Singer
- Margarete Haagen
- Beppo Brem
- Anton Färber
- Julius Frey
- Emil Matousek

== See also ==
- Überläufer

== Bibliography ==
- Beevor, Antony (2014). The Mystery of Olga Chekhova: The True Story of a Family Torn Apart by Revolution and War. London: Penguin Books. ISBN 978-0-14-192594-3.
