= Wir fahren gegen Engeland =

German patriotic sailors' song from 1914

Wir fahren gegen Engeland ("For we take on England") or Das Engelandlied ("The England Song") is a patriotic German sailors hymn written by Hermann Löns In 1914. It was popular in The German Navy and later the Kriegsmarine, as well as the German people where it is still quoted, but in a humorous way.
