= Father Is Being Stupid =

1953 film

- Directed by: Johannes Häussler
- Written by: Walter F. Fichelscher (book); Johannes Häussler; Kurt Moos
- Produced by: Johannes Häussler
- Starring: Otto Gebühr; Camilla Horn; Herbert Hübner
- Cinematography: Horst W. Paul; Siegfried Weinmann
- Edited by: Johannes Häussler
- Music by: Richard Stauch
- Production company: Johannes Häussler Filmproduktion
- Distributed by: Interna Filmverleih; Titania-Filmverleih
- Release date: 2 December 1953
- Running time: 87 minutes
- Country: West Germany
- Language: German

Father Is Being Stupid (German: Vati macht Dummheiten) is a 1953 West German comedy film directed by Johannes Häussler and starring Otto Gebühr, Camilla Horn and Herbert Hübner.

== Cast ==
- Otto Gebühr as Der alte Hannsen, Rennfahrer a.D.
- Camilla Horn as Baronin von Baran
- Herbert Hübner as Fabrikant Ewers, Lottchens Vater
- Claus Geißler as Wolfgang
- Florentine von Castell as Lottchen
- Ilse Fürstenberg as Frau Kirchner, Wolfgangs Mutter
- Hans Fidesser as Paul Bartels
- Kurt Vespermann as Kaminski
- Reinhold Brinkmann as Baron Koczy
- Klaus Günther Neumann as Rundfunkreporter
- Paul Mederow as Kriminalrat
- Claire Molzahn
- Nora Brand
- Reinhard Kolldehoff
- Wolfgang Gens
- Rudi Beil
- Erhard Ey-Steineck
- Die Schöneberger Sängerknaben as Kinderchor, Themselves
- Branko Berlan

== Bibliography ==
- Hans-Michael Bock and Tim Bergfelder. The Concise Cinegraph: An Encyclopedia of German Cinema. Berghahn Books, 2009.
