= Cuba Cabana =

1952 film

- Directed by: Fritz Peter Buch
- Written by: Fritz Peter Buch
- Based on: Cuba Cabana by Tibor Yost
- Produced by: Hans Lehmann
- Starring: Zarah Leander; O. W. Fischer; Paul Hartmann; Hans Richter
- Cinematography: Richard Angst
- Edited by: Walter Wischniewsky
- Music by: Bruno Balz; Heino Gaze
- Production company: Rhombus Film
- Distributed by: Herzog Film
- Release date: 9 December 1952
- Running time: 90 minutes
- Country: West Germany
- Language: German

Cuba Cabana is a 1952 West German drama film directed by Fritz Peter Buch and starring Zarah Leander, O.W. Fischer and Paul Hartmann. It was the second film of an early 1950s comeback for Leander, who had been a major star during the Nazi era. The film was based on a short story of the same title by Tibor Yost. It was shot at the Bavaria Studios in Munich and on location in Madrid, Barcelona, Sevilla and Malga. The film's sets were designed by the art directors Bruno Monden and Hermann Warm.

== Synopsis ==
In a South American island country, journalist Robby is wanted for murder after his attempt to take photographs of striking oil workers leads to a brawl involving the chief engineer who later succumbs to an injury. Robby goes to take shelter with Arabella, the owner and headliner of the nightclub Cuba Cabana. She has long been the subject of admiration of the governor, whose police are on the track of Robby. Arabella and the journalist are now lovers, but a deal is brokered in which he is spared the death penalty and is expelled from the country. She remains behind, with the governor now hopeful she will be receptive to his advances.

== Cast ==
- Zarah Leander as Arabella
- O.W. Fischer as Robby Tomsen
- Paul Hartmann as Gouverneur
- Hans Richter as Billy
- Eduard Linkers as Honneg
- Karl Meixner as Pandulkar
- Nicolas Koline as Jose
- Werner Lieven as Pedro
- Peter Elsholtz as Polizeikommissar
- John Pauls-Harding as Adjutant
- Hans Holten as Gomez
- Harald Mannl as Chefredakteur
- Karl Kreuzer as Inspizient
- Karl-Heinz Peters as Kriminalbeamter
- Heinz Kargus as Filippo
- Willy Rösner as Kapitän
- Gérard Tichy as Polizei-Oberst

== Bibliography ==
- Bruns, Jana Francesca. Nazi Cinema's New Women: Marika Roekk, Zarah Leander, Kristina Soederbaum. Stanford University, 2002.
- Goble, Alan. The Complete Index to Literary Sources in Film. Walter de Gruyter, 1999.
- Marshall, Bill & Stillwell, Jeananne. Musicals: Hollywood and Beyond. Intellect Books, 2000.
