= A Piece of Heaven =

1957 film directed by Rudolf Jugert

- Directed by: Rudolf Jugert
- Written by: Paul Helwig; Juliane Kay
- Produced by: Georg Richter
- Starring: Ingrid Andree; Toni Sailer; Margit Saad
- Cinematography: Günther Senftleben
- Edited by: Anneliese Schönnenbeck
- Music by: Franz Grothe
- Production company: Corona Filmproduktion
- Distributed by: Bavaria Film
- Release dates: December 1957 (Vienna); 3 January 1958 (Munich)
- Running time: 92 minutes
- Country: West Germany
- Language: German

A Piece of Heaven (German: Ein Stück vom Himmel) is a 1957 West German romance film directed by Rudolf Jugert and starring Ingrid Andree, Toni Sailer and Margit Saad. It was shot at the Bavaria Studios in Munich and on location around the city, as well as at the Schloss Höhenried and Lake Starnberg. The film's sets were designed by the art directors Franz Bi and Bruno Monden.

== Cast ==
- Ingrid Andree as Christine von Pröhl
- Toni Sailer as Peter Keller
- Margit Saad as Erika
- Boy Gobert as Sir Jackie Taft-Holery
- Erik Schumann as Ronald Henning
- Chariklia Baxevanos as Das Mädchen Elfriede
- Gustav Knuth as Ludwig von Pröhl
- Rudolf Vogel as Herr Müller
- Paul Henckels as Kammerdiener Josephus
- Margarete Haagen as Dame im Auto
- Hans Hermann Schaufuß as LKW-Fahrer
- Iska Geri as Kellnerin
- Liesl Karlstadt as Dame am Bahnhof
- Georg Thomalla as Willi
- Horst Buchholz a Cabrio-Fahrer
- Günther Lüders as Kellner

== Bibliography ==
- Bock, Hans-Michael & Bergfelder, Tim. The Concise CineGraph. Encyclopedia of German Cinema. Berghahn Books, 2009.
