= We'll Talk About Love Later =

1953 film directed by Karl Anton

- Directed by: Karl Anton
- Written by: Karl Anton; Frank F. Braun (novel); Werner P. Zibaso
- Produced by: Willie Hoffmann-Andersen; Helmuth Volmer
- Starring: Gustav Fröhlich; Maria Holst; Liselotte Pulver
- Cinematography: Georg Krause
- Edited by: Martha Dübber
- Music by: Willy Schmidt-Gentner
- Production company: Apollo-Film
- Distributed by: Deutsche London-Film
- Release date: 5 March 1953
- Running time: 98 minutes
- Country: West Germany
- Language: German

We'll Talk About Love Later (German: Von Liebe reden wir später) is a 1953 West German comedy film directed by Karl Anton and starring Gustav Fröhlich, Maria Holst and Liselotte Pulver.

It was shot at the Tempelhof Studios in Berlin. The film's sets were designed by Hans Jürgen Kiebach and Gabriel Pellon.

== Cast ==
- Gustav Fröhlich as Jonny Pitter
- Maria Holst as Angela Bell
- Liselotte Pulver as Bianca Merz
- Fita Benkhoff as Margot Hollmann
- Willy Fritsch as Professor Christian Hollmann
- Peter Mosbacher as Will Brodersen
- Paul Hörbiger as Geschäftsführer der 'Fledermaus'
- Hubert von Meyerinck as Herr Wilmar, Inhaber Kosmetik-Salon
- Ludwig Schmitz as Standesbeamter
- Franz Schafheitlin as Juwelier Penzner
- Paul Heidemann
- Wolfgang Neuss as Detektiv Leonhard Pingel
- Olga Limburg
- Else Reval
- Karl Vibach as Carlo Hollmann
- Walter Gross as Sekretär des Standesbeamten
- Arno Paulsen
- Ewald Wenck
- Edith Hancke as Frau Pingel
- Ingeborg Wellmann
- Kurt Pratsch-Kaufmann
- Paul Westermeier
- Käthe Haack
- Wolfgang Condrus
- Renée Franke as Singer
- Das Große Rias Tanzorchester as Tanz-Orchester
- Reinhard Kolldehoff
- Gerhard Wendland as Singer

== Bibliography ==
- Bock, Hans-Michael & Bergfelder, Tim. The Concise Cinegraph: Encyclopaedia of German Cinema. Berghahn Books, 2009.
