= Diary of a Married Woman =

1953 film

- German: Tagebuch einer Verliebten
- Directed by: Josef von Báky
- Written by: Emil Burri; Karl Peter Gillmann; Dinah Nelken (novel); Johannes Mario Simmel
- Produced by: Karl Julius Fritzsche
- Starring: Maria Schell; O. W. Fischer; Margarete Haagen
- Cinematography: Oskar Schnirch
- Edited by: Rudolf Schaad
- Music by: Alois Melichar
- Production company: Magna Film Produktion
- Distributed by: Deutsche London Film; Deutsche Film Hansa
- Release date: 19 October 1953
- Running time: 93 minutes
- Country: West Germany
- Language: German

Diary of a Married Woman (German: Tagebuch einer Verliebten) is a 1953 West German comedy film directed by Josef von Báky, starring Maria Schell, O. W. Fischer and Margarete Haagen.

The film's sets were designed by Hans Jürgen Kiebach and Gabriel Pellon. It was shot at the Göttingen Studios in Lower Saxony.

== Cast ==
- Maria Schell as Barbara Holzmann
- O. W. Fischer as Paul Holzmann
- Margarete Haagen as Oma Sanitätsrat
- Franco Andrei as Nicola
- Ernst Schroder as Dr. Hugendübel
- Willy Reichert as Hotelportier
- Erna Sellmer as Frau Bumke
- Hans Stiebner as Herr Krause
- Ute Sielisch as Fräulein Käthi
- Rudolf Kalvius as Oberkellner
- Gerd Sylla as Karli
- Hermann Pfeiffer as Standesbeamte
