= Franz Bi =

German art director (1899–1968)

- Born: 2 April 1899; Berlin, German Empire
- Died: 25 December 1968 (aged 69); Rothenburg, Bavaria, West Germany
- Other name: Franz Bartlakowski
- Occupation: Art director
- Years active: 1941-1964 (film)

Franz Bi (2 April 1899 – 25 December 1968) was a German art director. He worked on the set design of more than forty films during his career, often in collaboration with Bruno Monden.

== Selected filmography ==
- Battle Squadron Lützow (1941)
- The Night in Venice (1942)
- The Rainer Case (1942)
- The Golden Spider (1943)
- Beloved Darling (1943)
- When the Young Wine Blossoms (1943)
- A Man Like Maximilian (1945)
- In the Temple of Venus (1948)
- Chased by the Devil (1950)
- The Man Who Wanted to Live Twice (1950)
- Five Suspects (1950)
- Fanfares of Love (1951)
- The Blue and White Lion (1952)
- House of Life (1952)
- The Great Temptation (1952)
- Street Serenade (1953)
- A Heart Plays False (1953)
- The Eternal Waltz (1954)
- A Woman of Today (1954)
- André and Ursula (1955)
- San Salvatore (1956)
- A Piece of Heaven (1957)
- An American in Salzburg (1958)
- Restless Night (1958)
- A Summer You Will Never Forget (1959)
- People in the Net (1959)
- Conny and Peter Make Music (1960)
- Agatha, Stop That Murdering! (1960)

== Bibliography ==
- Giesen, Rolf. Nazi Propaganda Films: A History and Filmography. McFarland, 2003.
