= Maria Holst =

Austrian actress

- Born: 2 April 1917; Vienna; Austria-Hungary
- Died: 8 October 1980 (aged 63); Salzburg; Austria
- Occupation: Film actor
- Years active: 1933–1959

Maria Holst (1917–1980) was an Austrian film actress.

== Selected filmography ==
- Invisible Opponent (1933)
- Court Theatre (1936)
- Operetta (1940)
- Vienna Blood (1942)
- Dog Days (1944)
- Kiss Me Casanova (1949)
- The Trip to Marrakesh (1949)
- The Murder Trial of Doctor Jordan (1949)
- Chased by the Devil (1950)
- When the Evening Bells Ring (1951)
- The Heath Is Green (1951)
- Don't Ask My Heart (1952)
- A Thousand Red Roses Bloom (1952)
- We'll Talk About Love Later (1953)
- The Emperor Waltz (1953)
- Roses from the South (1954)
- Walking Back into the Past (1954)
- The Trapp Family (1956)
- A Heart Returns Home (1956)
