= Tibor Yost =

Hungarian journalist and screenwriter

- Born: 15 March 1896; Budapest, Austro-Hungarian Empire
- Died: 8 May 1968; Hof, Bavaria, West Germany
- Occupation: Writer

Tibor Yost (15 March 1896 – 8 May 1968) was a Hungarian journalist and a screenwriter.

== Selected filmography ==
- The Gypsy Baron (1935)
- Vagabonds (1949)
- I'll Make You Happy (1949)
- When the Heath Dreams at Night (1952)
- Don't Ask My Heart (1952)
- Cuba Cabana (1952)
- Desires (1952)
- Son Without a Home (1955)
- When the Alpine Roses Bloom (1955)
- The Priest from Kirchfeld (1955)
- The Bath in the Barn (1956)
- Almenrausch and Edelweiss (1957)
- The Gypsy Baron (1962)

== Bibliography ==
- Ann C. Paietta. Saints, Clergy and Other Religious Figures on Film and Television, 1895-2003. McFarland, 2005.
