= Berthold Ebbecke =

German actor and screenwriter (1906–1969)

- Born: 2 April 1906; Durlach, Karlsruhe, German Empire
- Died: 25 May 1969 (aged 63); West Germany
- Occupations: Actor, writer
- Years active: 1935–1950 (film)

Berthold Ebbecke (1906–1969) was a German actor and screenwriter. He collaborated with Ludwig Metzger.

== Selected filmography ==
=== Actor ===
- Trouble Backstairs (1935)
- The Court Concert (1936)
- The Beggar Student (1936)
- Ride to Freedom (1937)
- Secret Code LB 17 (1938)
- Nanon (1939)
- In the Name of the People (1939)
- The Murder Trial of Doctor Jordan (1949)
- The Trip to Marrakesh (1949)
- Theodore the Goalkeeper (1950)

=== Writer ===
- Secret Code LB 17 (1938)
- Central Rio (1939)

== Bibliography ==
- Noack, Frank. Veit Harlan: The Life and Work of a Nazi Filmmaker. University Press of Kentucky, 2016.
- Tegel, Susan. Jew Suss: Life, Legend, Fiction, Film. A&C Black, 2011.
