= Margarete Haagen =

German actress (1889–1966)

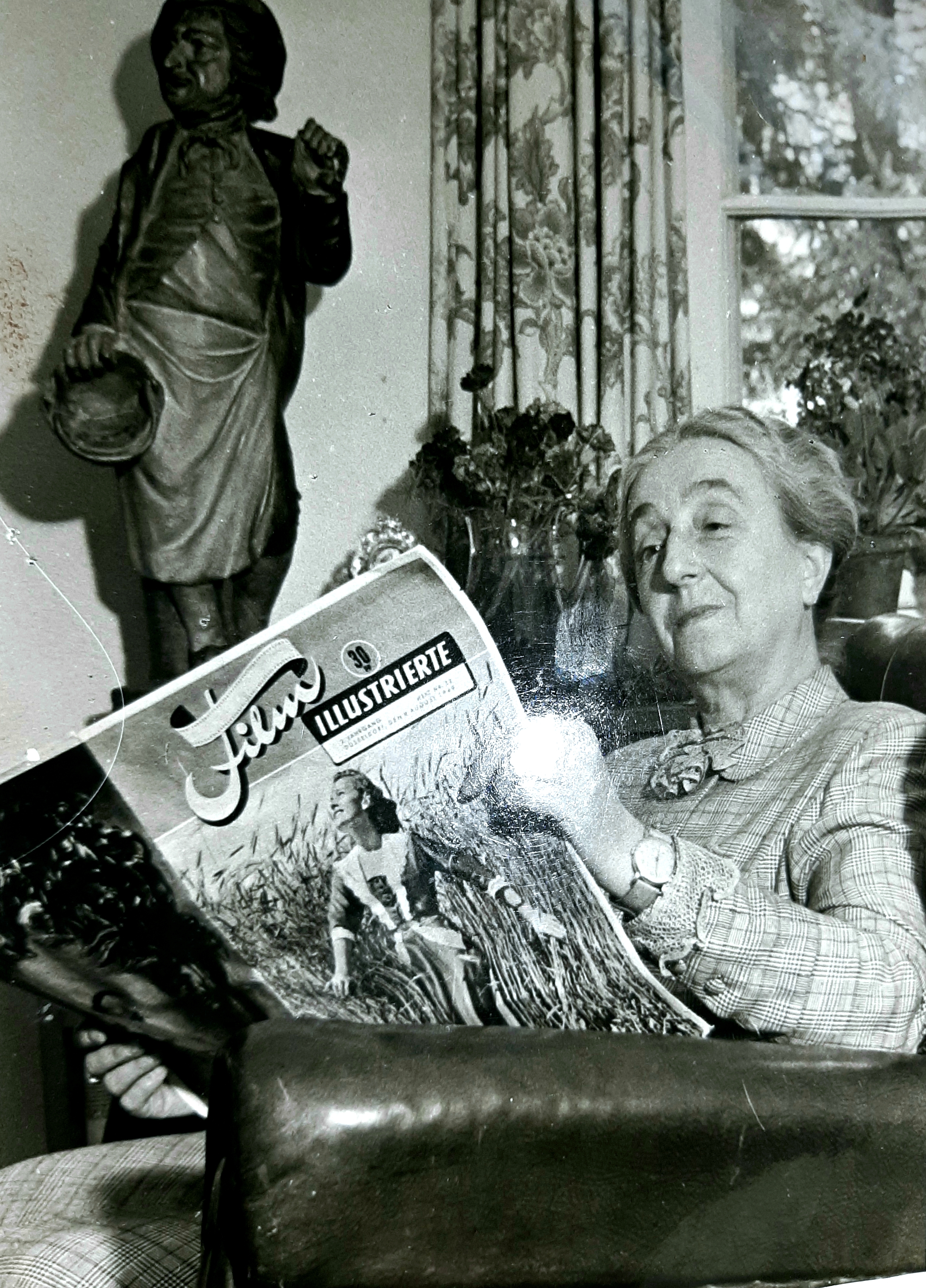
- Born: 29 November 1889; Nuremberg, Bavaria; German Empire
- Died: 19 November 1966 (aged 76); Munich, Bavaria; West Germany
- Occupation: Actress
- Years active: 1907–1966

Margarete Haagen (29 November 1889 – 19 November 1966) was a German stage and film actress. Haagen appeared in over a hundred films during her career, generally in character roles. She specialised in playing good-natured elderly ladies. Following the Second World War, she appeared in several rubble films, such as In Those Days (1947). During the 1950s, she often appeared in heimatfilm and costume films.

== Partial filmography ==
- Left of the Isar, Right of the Spree (1940)
- The Sinful Village (1940)
- The Girl from Barnhelm (1940)
- Ich Klagen An (1941)
- Beloved World (1942)
- The Little Residence (1942)
- My Summer Companion (1943)
- Don't Talk to Me About Love (1943)
- Kohlhiesel's Daughters (1943)
- The Green Salon (1944)
- That Was My Life (1944)
- The Song of the Nightingale (1944)
- Come Back to Me (1944)
- Under the Bridges (1946)
- In Those Days (1947)
- The Original Sin (1948)
- In the Temple of Venus (1948)
- The Last Night (1949)
- The Murder Trial of Doctor Jordan (1949)
- Amico (1949)
- I'll Make You Happy (1949)
- Nothing But Coincidence (1949)
- Beloved Liar (1950)
- The Beautiful Galatea (1950)
- The Heath Is Green (1951)
- A Heidelberg Romance (1951)
- Wild West in Upper Bavaria (1951)
- Professor Nachtfalter (1951)
- Fritz and Friederike (1952)
- A Thousand Red Roses Bloom (1952)
- The Exchange (1952)
- Behind Monastery Walls (1952)
- Two People (1952)
- When the Heath Dreams at Night (1952)
- Until We Meet Again (1952)
- The Chaplain of San Lorenzo (1953)
- Life Begins at Seventeen (1953)
- Fanfare of Marriage (1953)
- Diary of a Married Woman (1953)
- Red Roses, Red Lips, Red Wine (1953)
- The Monastery's Hunter (1953)
- Fireworks (1954)
- Consul Strotthoff (1954)
- The Beautiful Miller (1954)
- Emil and the Detectives (1954)
- Three Men in the Snow (1955)
- The Immenhof Girls (1955)
- Reaching for the Stars (1955)
- Santa Lucia (1956)
- The Stolen Trousers (1956)
- My Husband's Getting Married Today (1956)
- Winter in the Woods (1956)
- Hochzeit auf Immenhof (1956)
- Queen Louise (1957)
- A Piece of Heaven (1957)
- The Twins from Zillertal (1957)
- Ferien auf Immenhof (1957)
- Heart Without Mercy (1958)
- Here I Am, Here I Stay (1959)
- Paprika (1959)
- Crime Tango (1960)
- Stage Fright (1960)
- Robert and Bertram (1961)
- Love Has to Be Learned (1963)
- Aunt Frieda (1965)

== Bibliography ==
- Ó Dochartaigh, Pól & Schönfeld, Christiane. Representing the Good German in Literature and Culture After 1945: Altruism and Moral Ambiguity. Camden House, 2013.
- Shandley, Robert. Rubble Films: German Cinema in the Shadow of the Third Reich. Temple University Press, 2010.
