= Bruno Lutz =

German art director (1889–1964)

- Born: 7 June 1889; Berlin, German Empire
- Died: 5 March 1964 (aged 74); West Germany
- Occupation: Art director
- Years active: 1927–1962 (film)

Bruno Lutz (7 June 1889 – 5 March 1964) was a German art director.

== Selected filmography ==
- The Transformation of Dr. Bessel (1927)
- The Lady in Black (1928)
- The Beaver Coat (1928)
- Adventures in the Engadin (1932)
- Two Good Comrades (1933)
- When the Village Music Plays on Sunday Nights (1933)
- Bashful Felix (1934)
- The Big Chance (1934)
- The Champion of Pontresina (1934)
- The Riders of German East Africa (1934)
- D III 88 (1939)
- The Fourth Is Not Coming (1939)
- Alarm (1941)
- Secret File W.B.1 (1942)
- Beloved Darling (1943)
- When the Young Wine Blossoms (1943)
- A Man Like Maximilian (1945)
- In the Temple of Venus (1948)
- Stars Over Colombo (1954)
- The Maharajah's Blonde (1962)

== Bibliography ==
- Bernadette Kester. Film Front Weimar: Representations of the First World War in German Films of the Weimar Period. Amsterdam University Press, 2003.
