= Jakko (film) =

1941 film

- Directed by: Fritz Peter Buch
- Written by: Fritz Peter Buch; Hein Meiswinkel
- Based on: Jakko by Alfred Weidenmann
- Produced by: Herbert Engelsing
- Starring: Norbert Rohringer; Eugen Klöpfer; Aribert Wäscher
- Cinematography: Paul Rischke
- Edited by: Waldemar Gaede; Elisabeth Kleinert-Neumann
- Music by: Hans-Otto Borgmann
- Production company: Tobis Film
- Distributed by: Tobis Film
- Release date: 12 October 1941
- Running time: 83 minutes
- Country: Germany
- Language: German

Jakko is a 1941 German drama film directed by Fritz Peter Buch and starring Norbert Rohringer, Eugen Klöpfer and Aribert Wäscher. It was shot at the Johannisthal Studios in Berlin and on location in Danzig. The film's sets were designed by the art directors Karl Böhm and Robert A. Dietrich.

== Cast ==
- Norbert Rohringer as Jakko
- Eugen Klöpfer as Anton
- Aribert Wäscher as Zaballo
- Albert Florath as Reeder Schröder
- Ali Ghito as Frau Schröder
- Inge Cupel as Sybille Schröder
- Gerhard Geisler as Kranführer
- Lutz Götz as Polizeibeamter
- Harry Hardt as Zirkusartist
- Trude Hesterberg as Soubrette
- Gerhard Hüfner as Kurt Buske
- Käthe Jöken-König as Maximilian Jurke
- Hilde Körber as Tante Klinkhardt
- Manfred Leber as Kapitän
- Ernst Legal as Polizeikommissar
- Carsta Löck as Rosa, Hausangestellte
- Hans Meyer-Hanno as Kraftfahrer bei Schröder
- Bettina Moissi as Petja
- Heddo Schulenburg as Albert
- Armin Schweizer as Verwalter Buske
- Rolf Storch as Gefolgschaftsführer der Marine-HJ
- Rüdiger Trantow as Jochen Schröder
- Paul Verhoeven as Lehrer Kohler
- Ewald Wenck as Glasermeister
- Walter Werner as Schuldiener
- Paul Westermeier as Stupat
- Hans-Heinz Wunderlich as Ursula Zell

== Bibliography ==
- Bock, Hans-Michael. Die Tobis 1928-1945: eine kommentierte Filmografie. Edition Text + Kritik, 2003.
- Klaus, Ulrich J. Deutsche Tonfilme: Jahrgang 1940. Klaus-Archiv, 1988.
