= The Heath Is Green (1932 film) =

1932 film

- Directed by: Hans Behrendt
- Written by: Hermann Löns (novel); Curt J. Braun; Bobby E. Lüthge
- Produced by: Robert Neppach
- Starring: Camilla Spira; Peter Voß; Theodor Loos
- Cinematography: Ewald Daub
- Music by: Karl Blume; Walter Ulfig; Grete Walter
- Production company: R.N.-Filmproduktion
- Distributed by: Europa-Filmverleih
- Release date: 9 December 1932
- Running time: 85 minutes
- Country: Germany
- Language: German

The Heath Is Green (German: Grün ist die Heide) is a 1932 German musical film directed by Hans Behrendt and starring Camilla Spira, Peter Voß and Theodor Loos.

It was based on the novel by Hermann Löns which was made into further films in 1951 and in 1972. The film was partly shot on Lüneburg Heath.

== Plot ==
The young forester Walter wants to catch a dangerous poacher in the Lüneburg Heath. He pursues a man into the house of the landowner Lüdersen and meets his daughter Grete. Grete discovers that her father, who used to own the whole area, is the poacher. She asks him to move into town with her.

Walter can't catch the poacher. Chief Forester Schliepemann then has the whole area surrounded. The traveling trader Specht is arrested as a poacher. Lüdersen had surprised Specht and was fatally wounded by him. He dies putting Grete's hand in Walter's.

== Cast ==
- Camilla Spira as Grete Lüdersen
- Peter Voß as Walter - Ein junger Förster
- Theodor Loos as Lüder Lüdersen
- Fritz Kampers as Alois
- Hugo Werner-Kahle as Der Oberförster
- Paul Beckers as Blümchen
- Karl Blume as Nachtigall
- Fritz Odemar
- Alfred Beierle
- Gerhard Bienert
- Gerhard Dammann
- Bruno Ziener
- Kurt Meißner
- Ida Krill
