= Willy Birgel =

German actor (1891–1973)

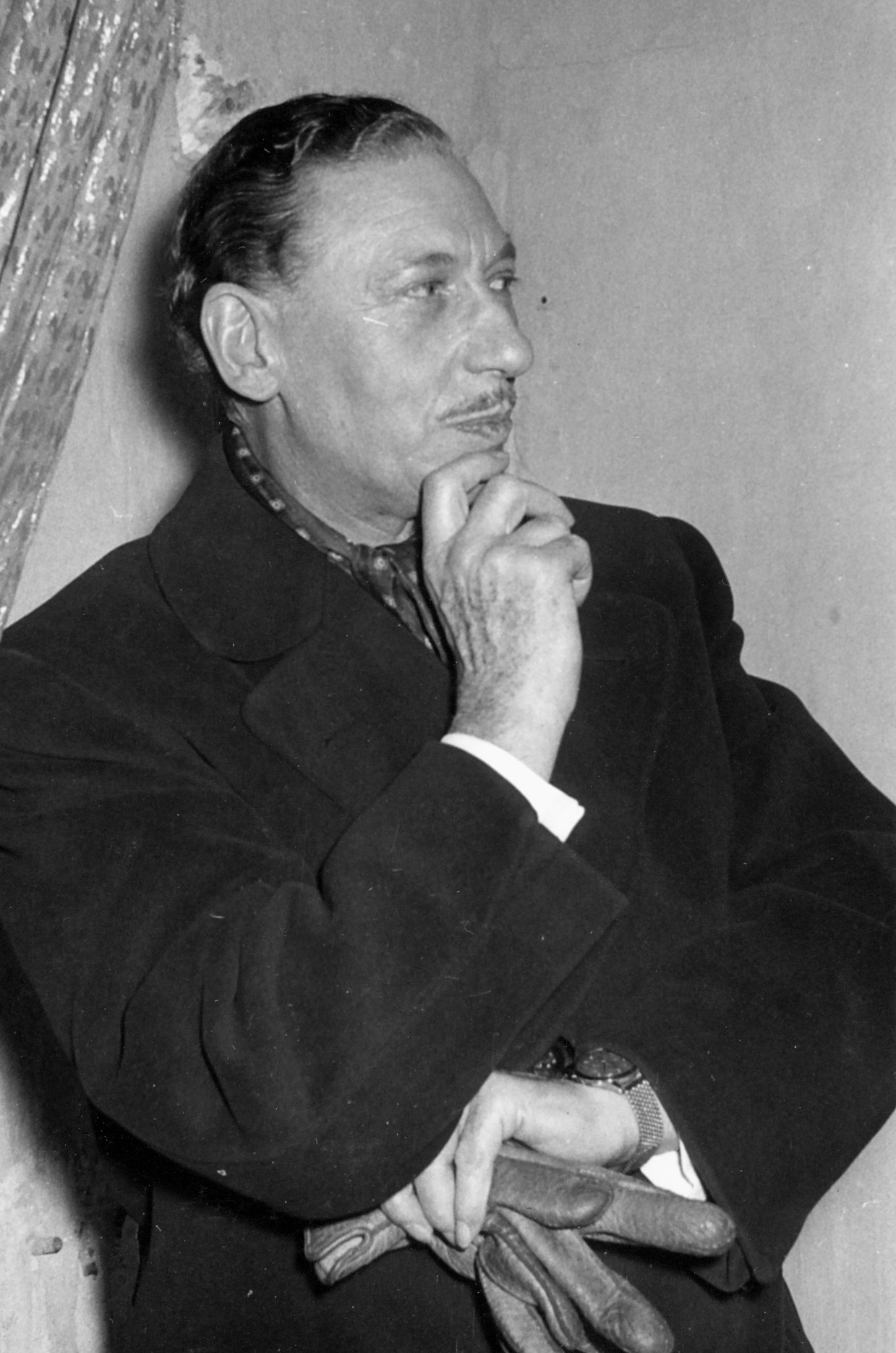
- Birgel in 1955
- Born: Wilhelm Maria Birgel; 19 September 1891; Cologne, German Empire
- Died: 29 December 1973 (aged 82); Dübendorf, Switzerland
- Occupation: Actor
- Years active: 1912–1971

Willy Birgel (19 September 1891 – 29 December 1973), born Wilhelm Maria Birgel, was a German theatre and film actor.

== Career ==
Birgel began his acting career before World War I on the stage in his native city of Cologne, and came to movies rather late. He was about 43 years old before he got his first major film role as the English camp commandant in Paul Wegener's A Man Wants to Get to Germany. This UFA-production that premiered on 26 July 1934, portrays a German engineer living in South America who hears in 1914 of war in Europe. Realising his obligation to his Fatherland, he sets out for Europe, joined by a German comrade. The journey to Germany involves physical hardships, treacherous terrain, and hostile seas, obstacles faced by patriots who have only one thought: to return home to Germany to help a fatherland under attack. The film spoke of the kind of German values that were emphasized in Nazi Germany.

Similar films made by Birgel for the National Socialist Regime include Unternehmen Michael (1937), Feinde (1940) and Kameraden (1941). In 1937, Reichspropagandaminister Joseph Goebbels named Birgel Staatsschauspieler or roughly Actor of the State, the highest honor Germany had for actors at the time. Besides the propaganda films, Birgel starred in a number of popular movies such as Der Fall Deruga (1938), becoming an unlikely public favorite.

After World War II, Birgel was on the Allied black-list and did not make another film until 1947. By the 1950s, he was back to his pre-war popularity. In the 1960s, Birgel was able to make the transition to television.

== Death ==
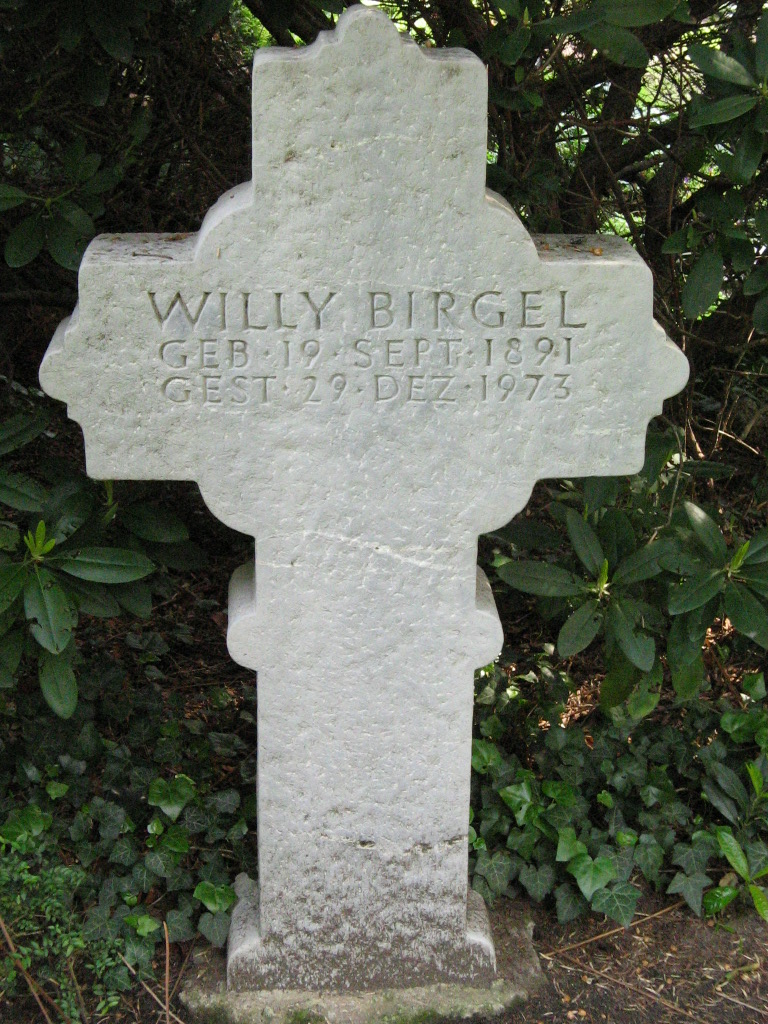
Willy Birgel's grave at the Melaten Cemetery in Cologne

Birgel died in 1973 of heart failure at Dübendorf near Zürich. He was buried at the Melaten Cemetery in his birth city, Cologne.

== Selected filmography ==
- A Man Wants to Get to Germany (1934) – English Camp Commandant
- Count Woronzeff (1934) – Petroff, Woronzeffs Sekretär
- Barcarole (1935) – Alfredo Zubaran
- Joan of Arc (1935) – La Trémouille
- One Too Many on Board (1935) – Staatsanwalt Dr. Burger
- Black Roses (1935) – Prince Abarow
- Schlußakkord (1936) – Garvenberg, Generalmusikdirektor
- The Traitor (1936) – Agent Morris
- Ride to Freedom (1937) – Julek Staniewski
- Men Without a Fatherland (1937) – Baron Falen
- To New Shores (1937) – Sir Albert Finsbury
- Unternehmen Michael (1937) – Major Graf Schellenberg
- Fanny Elssler (1937) – Hofrat Friedrich Gentz
- Faded Melody (1938) – Thomas Gront
- Secret Code LB 17 (1938) – Capt. Arvan Terno
- The Deruga Case (1938) – Dr. Stefan Deruga
- The Blue Fox (1938) – Tabor Vary
- Hotel Sacher (1939) – Stefan Schefczuk
- The Governor (1939) – General Werkonen
- Maria Ilona (1939) – Prince Karl Felix of Schwarzenberg
- Congo Express (1939) – Viktor Hartmann
- The Heart of a Queen (1940) – Lord Bothwell
- Enemies (1940) – Keith
- Riding for Germany (1941) – Rittmeister Ernst von Brenken
- Comrades (1941) – Major Karl von Wedell
- Diesel (1942) – Rudolf Diesel
- The Dark Day (1943) – Martin Pauly, Oberstaatsanwalt
- Du gehörst zu mir (1943) – Professor Dr. Burkhardt
- The Master of the Estate (1943) – Bernhard von Halleborg
- I Need You (1944) – Prof. Paulus Allmann
- Music in Salzburg (1944) – Anton Klinger
- The Noltenius Brothers (1945) – Wolfgang Noltenius
- Leb' wohl, Christina (1945) – Dr. Petersen
- Between Yesterday and Tomorrow (1947) – Alexander Corty
- In the Temple of Venus (1948) – Dr. Cornelius Riehl
- Chased by the Devil (1950) – Dr. Fingal
- Das ewige Spiel (1951) – Ulrich Campenhausen
- When the Evening Bells Ring (1951) – Albrecht von Finke
- Don't Ask My Heart (1952) – Herr von Birkhausen
- Heidi (1952) – Herr Sesemann / Ludwig Sesemann
- The Chaplain of San Lorenzo (1953) – Catani
- Stars Over Colombo (1953) – Maharadscha von Jailapur Gowan
- The Prisoner of the Maharaja (1954) – Maharadscha von Jailapur Gowan
- Consul Strotthoff (1954) – Konsul Strotthoff
- Captain Wronski (1954) – Rittmeister Wronski
- Heidi and Peter (1955) – Herr Sesemann / Mr. Sesemann
- Ein Mann vergißt die Liebe (1955) – Dr. Kadenberg
- Island of the Dead (1955) – Frank
- Love's Carnival (1955) – Georg von Grobitzsch
- Rosen für Bettina (1956) – Professor Förster
- A Heart Returns Home (1956) – Robert Lennart
- Johannisnacht (1956) – Christian von Hergeth
- Between Time and Eternity (1956) – Prof. Thomas Bohlen
- The Saint and Her Fool (1957) – Fürst von Brauneck
- Doctor Bertram (1957) – Dr. Bertram
- Liebe kann wie Gift sein (1958) – Joachim Köhler
- Le bellissime gambe di Sabrina (1958) – Graf Gottfried
- The Priest and the Girl (1958) – von Gronau
- Arena of Fear (1959) – Cameron, Kunstschütze
- A Doctor of Conviction (1959) – Staatsanwalt Perschke
- When the Bells Sound Clearly (1959) – Graf von Warthenberg
- The Last of Mrs. Cheyney (1961) – Lord Elton
- Romance in Venice (1962) – Theodor von Bruggern
- Coffin from Hong Kong (1964) – William Jefferson
- Agent 505: Death Trap in Beirut (1966) – Omar Abdullah
- No Shooting Time for Foxes (1966) – Hunting Author
- Beyond Control (1968) – Public Prosecutor
