= The Rainer Case =

1942 film

- Directed by: Paul Verhoeven
- Written by: Jacob Geis; Wilhelm Krug; Herbert Reinecker (novel Der Mann mit der Geige); Paul Verhoeven
- Produced by: Herbert Engelsing
- Starring: Luise Ullrich; Paul Hubschmid; Karl Schönböck
- Cinematography: Fritz Arno Wagner
- Edited by: Elisabeth Kleinert-Neumann
- Music by: Norbert Schultze
- Production company: Tobis Film
- Distributed by: Deutsche Filmvertriebs
- Release date: 12 May 1942
- Running time: 90 minutes
- Country: Germany
- Language: German

The Rainer Case (German: Der Fall Rainer) is a 1942 German drama film directed by Paul Verhoeven and starring Luise Ullrich, Paul Hubschmid and Karl Schönböck.

The film's sets were designed by the art directors Franz Bi and Botho Hoefer. It was partly shot on location around Admont in Austria. The film is set in 1918 during the closing stages of the First World War.

== Main cast ==
- Luise Ullrich as Prinzessin Henriette von Battenstein
- Paul Hubschmid as Franz Rainer
- Karl Schönböck as Erzherzog Karl Maria
- Elisabeth Markus as Fürstin von Battenstein
- Sepp Rist as Hauptmann Leopold Lechner
- Norbert Rohringer as Peter Lechner
- Maria Koppenhöfer as Gräfin Erna von Eckersberg
- Heinz Salfner as Auditor
- Viktor Gehring as Infanterist Schober
- Erich Musil as Unteroffizier Dirrmoser
- Oskar Dimroth as Hofrat Hordaczek
- Bruno Hübner as Orchestervorstand Sonberger
- Ekkehard Arendt as Adjutant des Erzherzogs
- Kurt Meisel as Leutnant von Benda
- Karl Günther as Ehrengerichtsvorsitzender
- Hubert Kiurina as Infanterist Natterer
- Heinrich Troxbömker as Kammerdiener Gaston
- Walter Janssen as Haushofmeister
- Karl Hellmer as Verwaltungsinspektor Strehuber
- Luis Rainer as Divisionskommandeur
- Ernst Sattler as Generalarzt
- Karl Etlinger as Oberazt
- Erich Ponto as Hotelwirt
- Gabriele Hoffmann as Oberschwester
- Melanie Horeschowsky as Wirtschafterin bei Birr

== Bibliography ==
- Bock, Hans-Michael & Bergfelder, Tim. The Concise CineGraph. Encyclopedia of German Cinema. Berghahn Books, 2009.
