= Norbert Rohringer =

Austrian actor

- Born: 9 April 1927; Vienna, Austria
- Died: 30 July 2009 (aged 82); Hamburg, Germany
- Occupation: Actor
- Years active: 1936-1945 (film)

Norbert Rohringer (1927–2009) was an Austrian film actor. He appeared as a child actor in a number of film productions from the Nazi era, including the title role in Jakko in 1941.

== Selected filmography ==
- His Daughter is Called Peter (1936)
- Anton the Last (1939)
- Jakko (1941)
- The Rainer Case (1942)
- The War of the Oxen (1943)
- The Impostor (1944)
- That Was My Life (1944)
- A Man Like Maximilian (1945)

== Bibliography ==
- Giesen, Rolf. Nazi Propaganda Films: A History and Filmography. McFarland & Company, 2003.
- Holmstrom, John. The Moving Picture Boy: An International Encyclopaedia from 1895 to 1995 Michael Russell, 1996.
