= Wild West in Upper Bavaria =

1951 film

- Directed by: Ferdinand Dörfler
- Written by: Curt Hanno Gutbrod; Ludwig Schmid-Wildy
- Produced by: Ferdinand Dörfler
- Starring: Joe Stöckel; Margarete Haagen; Renate Mannhardt
- Cinematography: Josef Illig; Franz Koch
- Edited by: Erwin Niecke
- Music by: Arthur Schanze
- Production company: Dörfler-Filmproduktion
- Distributed by: Allianz Filmverleih
- Release date: 11 October 1951
- Running time: 87 minutes
- Country: West Germany
- Language: German

Wild West in Upper Bavaria (German: Wildwest in Oberbayern) is a 1951 West German comedy film directed by Ferdinand Dörfler and starring Joe Stöckel, Margarete Haagen and Renate Mannhardt. It was shot at the Schwanthalerhöh Studios in Munich and on location in the valley of the Isar. The film's sets were designed by the art director Max Seefelder.

== Synopsis ==
A Berlin-based film company sends a film crew out to Upper Bavaria to film a western in the foothills of the Bavarian Alps, taking over the home of Alois Salvermoser, the innkeeper in a small village. The villagers are cast in roles in the film, including Alois as Chief Wild Buffalo, causing total chaos.

== Cast ==
- Joe Stöckel as Alois Salvermoser - Ochsenwirt
- Margarete Haagen as Mathilde, seine Frau
- Renate Mannhardt as Vevi - ihre Tochter
- Volker von Collande as Hans - Gestütsverwalter
- Lucie Englisch as Zenzi - Magd beim Ochsenwirt
- Beppo Brem as Sepp - Holzknecht
- Hella Petri as Lola Glamotta
- Fred Kraus as Erwin Flintsch
- Paul Demel as Regisseur Ruck-Zuck-Film
- Rudolf Platte as Aufnahmeleiter Bletschge
- Walter Giller as 2.Aufnahmeleiter Schmittchen

== Bibliography ==
- Drexl, Cindy. Faszination Wilder Westen: Living History im Kosmos des Münchner Cowboy-Clubs. Waxmann Verlag, 2022.
- Schulz, Günter. Ausländische Spiel- und abendfüllende Dokumentarfilme in den Kinos der SBZ/DDR, 1945–1966. Bundesarchiv-Filmarchiv, 2001.
