= Josef Illig =

German cinematographer (1908–1970)

- Born: 5 May 1908; Munich, Bavaria, German Empire
- Died: 20 May 1970 (aged 62); West Germany
- Occupation: Cinematographer
- Years active: 1931-1967 (film)

Josef Illig (1908-1970) was a German cinematographer.

== Selected filmography ==
- People Who Travel (1938)
- Water for Canitoga (1939)
- The Eternal Spring (1940)
- Keepers of the Night (1949)
- The Trip to Marrakesh (1949)
- Chased by the Devil (1950)
- Love on Ice (1950)
- Kissing Is No Sin (1950)
- King for One Night (1950)
- Two in One Suit (1950)
- Wild West in Upper Bavaria (1951)
- The Cloister of Martins (1951)
- My Name is Niki (1952)
- The Exchange (1952)
- The Crucifix Carver of Ammergau (1952)
- House of Life (1952)
- Scandal at the Girls' School (1953)

== Bibliography ==
- Fritsche, Maria. Homemade Men In Postwar Austrian Cinema: Nationhood, Genre and Masculinity . Berghahn Books, 2013.
