= People in the Storm =

1941 German drama film

- Directed by: Fritz Peter Buch
- Written by: Karl Anton; Felix von Eckardt; Georg Zoch
- Produced by: Fritz Klotzsch
- Starring: Gustav Diessl; Olga Tschechowa; Hannelore Schroth
- Cinematography: Eduard Hoesch
- Edited by: Martha Dübber
- Music by: Wolfgang Zeller
- Production company: Tobis Film
- Distributed by: Tobis Film
- Release date: 19 December 1941
- Running time: 80 minutes
- Country: Germany
- Language: German

People in the Sorm (German: Menschen im Sturm) is a 1941 German drama film directed by Fritz Peter Buch and starring Gustav Diessl, Olga Tschechowa and Hannelore Schroth. It was an anti-Serbian propaganda and part of a concerted propaganda push against Serbs, attempting to split them from the Croats. It was shot at the Johannisthal Studios in Berlin. The film's sets were designed by the art directors Hans Kuhnert and Artur Nortmann.

== Synopsis ==
Vera witnesses the persecution of ethnic Germans in Yugoslavia, which awakens her ethnic consciousness. Her cosmopolitan friend Alexander is arrested. Vera flirts with the Serbian commander to allow Volksdeutsche to escape to the border. When arrested, she proudly affirms that she helped her countrymen and, in an escape attempt, is shot, to die happy and heroic.

== Cast ==
- Gustav Diessl as Alexander Oswatic
- Olga Tschechowa as Vera seine Frau
- Hannelore Schroth as Marieluise Kornberg, Veras Tochter aus erster Ehe
- Siegfried Breuer as Hauptmann Rakic
- Kurt Meisel as Oberleutnant Duschan
- Franz Schafheitlin as Kommisar Subotic
- Heinz Welzel as Hans Neubert Lehrer
- Josef Sieber as Anton
- Rudolf Blümner as Apoteker Paulic
- Reinhold Bernt as Johann, Knecht auf dem Gut Oswatic
- Katja Pahl as Anna, seine Frau
- Heinrich Troxbömker as Rakics Bursche
- Josef Dahmen as serbischer Soldat, der Anna belästigt
- Fritz Wagner as Lech, ein Deutscher aus Bergau

== Production and release ==
The film was shot on locations in Hrvatsko Zagorje, then-Independent State of Croatia, in July 1941. Its Zagreb premiere was held on 21 March 1942.

Unusually, contemporary Viennese film magazine Paimann's Filmlisten classified the film as "forbidden for the youth" (für Jugendliche nicht zugelassen).

== Motifs ==
The film reprises many of the same motifs as Heimkehr, in an anti-Serbian rather than anti-Polish context.

A sympathetic Croat aids the Germans, stating that all Croats should be friendly, and is murdered by Serbs for it, reflecting a widespread cliche of the friendly Croat.

== Bibliography ==
- Hertzstein, Robert Edwin (1977). The War That Hitler Won. Putnam. ISBN 978-0-399-11845-6.
- Rafaelić, Daniel (2004). "Filmološko istraživanje u bečkom filmskom arhivu 2004" (PDF). Arhivski vjesnik (in Croatian). 47 (1). Croatian State Archives: 173–176.
