= The Chaplain of San Lorenzo =

1953 film

- German film poster
- German: Der Kaplan von San Lorenzo
- Directed by: Gustav Ucicky
- Written by: Kurt E. Walter
- Produced by: Willy Zeyn
- Starring: Willy Birgel; Dieter Borsche; Gertrud Kückelmann
- Cinematography: Georg Bruckbauer
- Edited by: Walter Fredersdorf
- Music by: Hans-Otto Borgmann
- Production company: Zeyn-Film
- Distributed by: Bavaria Film
- Release date: 26 February 1953
- Running time: 97 minutes
- Country: West Germany
- Language: German

The Chaplain of San Lorenzo (German: Der Kaplan von San Lorenzo) is a 1953 West German drama film directed by Gustav Ucicky and starring Willy Birgel, Dieter Borsche and Gertrud Kückelmann. It was shot at the Bavaria Studios in Munich. The film's sets were designed by the art directors Robert Herlth and Gottfried Will.

== Cast ==
- Willy Birgel as Catani
- Dieter Borsche as Don Stefano
- Gertrud Kückelmann as Gilda
- Ilse Steppat as Isabella Catani
- Ursula von Teubner as Gräfin Torri
- Margarete Haagen as Constanza
- Karl Skraup as Quirino
- Charles Regnier as Kriminalkommissar Morro
- Klaus W. Krause as Dr. Paquet
- Werner Fuetterer as Dr. Matheson
- Grete Reinwald as Tami
- Curt Ackermann as Gilda's defense lawyer
- Ernst Fritz Fürbringer as Prosecutor
- Walter Janssen as Judge
- Harald Mannl as Dr. Bracca
- Hans Pössenbacher as Como
- John Pauls-Harding
- Rudolf Reiff
