= Hermann Löns =

German journalist and writer (1866–1914)

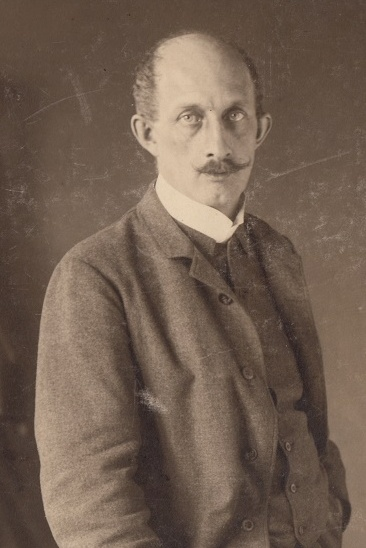
- Born: 29 October 1866; Kulm, Province of West Prussia, Kingdom of Prussia, German Confederation
- Died: 26 September 1914 (aged 47); Loivre, France (KIA)
- Occupations: Journalist & writer
- Spouse(s): Elisabet Erbeck (m. 1893–1901) Lisa Hausmann (m. 1901)
- Children: 1
- Military career
- Allegiance: German Empire
- Branch: Imperial German Army
- Service years: 1914
- Rank: Fusilier
- Unit: 73rd Fusilier Regiment
- Conflicts: World War I

Hermann Löns (29 August 1866 – 26 September 1914) was a German journalist and writer. He is most famous as "The Poet of the Heath" for his novels and poems celebrating the people and landscape of the North German moors, particularly the Lüneburg Heath in Lower Saxony. Löns is well known in Germany for his famous folksongs. He was also a hunter, naturalist and conservationist. Despite being well over the normal recruitment age, Löns enlisted and was killed in World War I and his purported remains were later used by the German government for celebratory purposes.

== Life and work ==
Hermann Löns was born on 29 August 1866 in Kulm (now Chełmno, Poland) in the Province of Prussia. He was one of twelve siblings, of whom five died early. His parents were Friedrich Wilhelm Löns (1832–1908) from Bochum, a teacher, and Klara (née Cramer; 1844–96) from Paderborn. Hermann Löns grew up in Deutsch-Krone (West Prussia). In 1884, the family relocated back to Westfalen as his father found a position in Münster. A sickly child who survived typhus, Löns graduated from school on his second try with the Abitur in 1886. Urged by his father, he began to attend courses at Münster university in preparation for studying medicine. In 1887, he started his studies at the University of Greifswald. There he joined the dueling fraternity Turnerschaft Cimbria, but was dismissed cum infamia (with infamy). In November 1888, Löns relocated to the university of Göttingen, but returned to Münster without having attained a degree. In fact, he never even enrolled at Göttingen but joined a drinking society called the Club der Bewusstlosen. At Münster he studied natural sciences emphasizing zoology at the Theologische und Philosophische Akademie from the spring of 1889 to autumn 1890. While there, he developed interests in environmental issues – protecting nature from damage by industrial activity – and in literature. However, he was also arrested in 1889 for disorderly conduct and sentenced to five days in jail for extinguishing gas lights and resisting arrest while drunk.

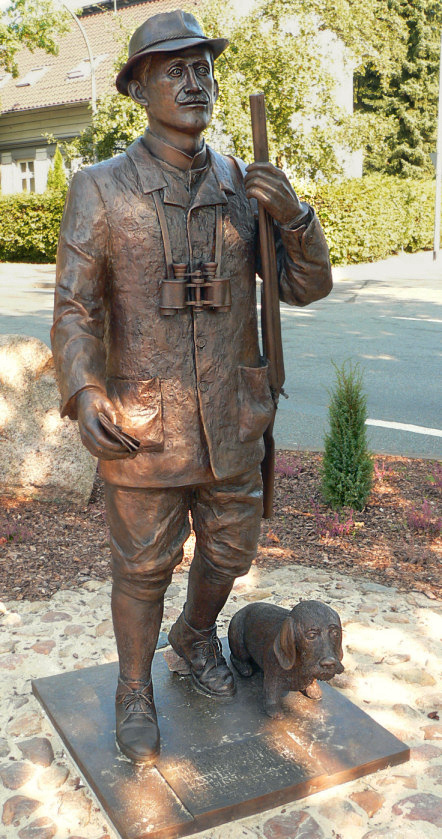
Bronze statue of Löns as a hunter, erected in 2006 in Walsrode.

In the autumn of 1891, Löns decided to quit university without graduating and to become a journalist. He went first to Kaiserslautern, where he worked for the newspaper Pfälzische Presse. He was dismissed after five months for being late and for being drunk. Löns then went to Gera where he again became an assistant editor, this time for the Reußische Volkszeitung. He also lost that job after three weeks, again for being drunk. Löns then started work as a freelance reporter for the Hannoveraner Anzeiger. From 1892, Löns lived in Hanover and as a regional news editor wrote about a wide variety of subjects. Some of his writings with the pseudonym "Fritz von der Leine" were collected as a book Ausgewählte Werke von Fritz von der Leine, published in 1902. The year before, Löns had published a collection of poetry and a book of short stories on hunting. In 1902, Löns quit the newspaper and co-founded the rival newspaper Hannoversche Allgemeine Zeitung. In April 1903, he became its editor-in-chief, but by February 1904 the newspaper folded due to a lack of funds. Löns then joined the Hannoversches Tagblatt, writing as "Ulenspeigel". It was at this time that Löns began to make a name for himself as a writer on nature, in particular on the heaths of Lower Saxony (Heidedichter). In 1906, he published these writings in Mein braunes Buch which became his first literary success. Löns became editor-in-chief of the newspaper Schaumburg-Lippische Landeszeitung of Bückeburg in 1907, and remained in this position through April 1909. Once again, alcohol consumption was the cause of his dismissal.

Freed from the need to do regular work as a newspaper man, Löns wrote and published several more of his works in 1909, emphasizing animal studies and characterization, including the popular Mümmelmann. That same year, he wrote three more novels, two of which were published in 1910, including The Warwolf (German: Der Wehrwolf), his most successful book, depicting the bloody revenge of Lower Saxony peasants against marauding soldiers of the Thirty Years War. The poems contained in the collection Der kleine Rosengarten (1911) were referred to by Löns as "folk songs" (Volkslieder). They included the Matrosenlied ("Sailors' Song") with the chorus Denn wir fahren gegen Engelland ("For we are sailing against England"), which was put to music by Herms Niel and became one of the most-sung German military songs of World War II. A number of his poems from Der kleine Rosengarten were set to music by Franz Gabriel (1883-1929) in 1927-8 and published in an album with a dedication to the tenor, Richard Tauber, who recorded 13 of them for Odeon in August 1928. Another of his poems, Das Geheimnis (The Secret), beginning 'Ja, grün ist die Heide', was set to music by Karl Blume and recorded by Tauber in 1932.

== Marriages and divorces ==
Löns had married Elisabet Erbeck (1864–1922), a divorced sales assistant, at Hanover in 1893 (engagement 1890, divorced 1901). She had five miscarriages and was committed to a sanatorium. Soon after the divorce, Löns had changed his confession from Catholic to Protestant and married Lisa Hausmann (an editorial assistant, born 1871), also at Hanover. He had a child with his second wife, but their son was mentally and physically handicapped. In 1911, his family left him, after he fired a shotgun inside their home. In the divorce proceedings he had a nervous breakdown. Löns refused to pay alimony and then left without leaving an address, travelling in Germany, Austria, Switzerland and the Netherlands. In November 1911, Löns considered suicide. In November 1912, he returned to Hanover and subsequently published two more collections of hunting and nature stories Auf der Wildbahn (1912) and Mein buntes Buch (1913), followed by his final novel, Die Häuser von Ohlendorf (1913). Suffering from bipolar disorder, Löns veered between depression and making fantastic plans for the future.

== First World War service ==
At the age of 48, he volunteered for service with the German Army for the First World War. Due to his ill health and weak constitution, he was rejected initially by the military. It took the intervention of an officer friend of his for Löns to be accepted as a common fusilier by the Ersatzbatallion of the Regiment Generalfeldmarschall Prinz Albrecht von Preußen, also known as 73rd Fusilier Regiment. On 26 September 1914, just three weeks after enlisting on 3 September, Löns was killed in action during an assault on a French position at Loivre near Reims in France. Of the 120 men in his unit, only two dozen survived.

== Reception in Nazi Germany ==
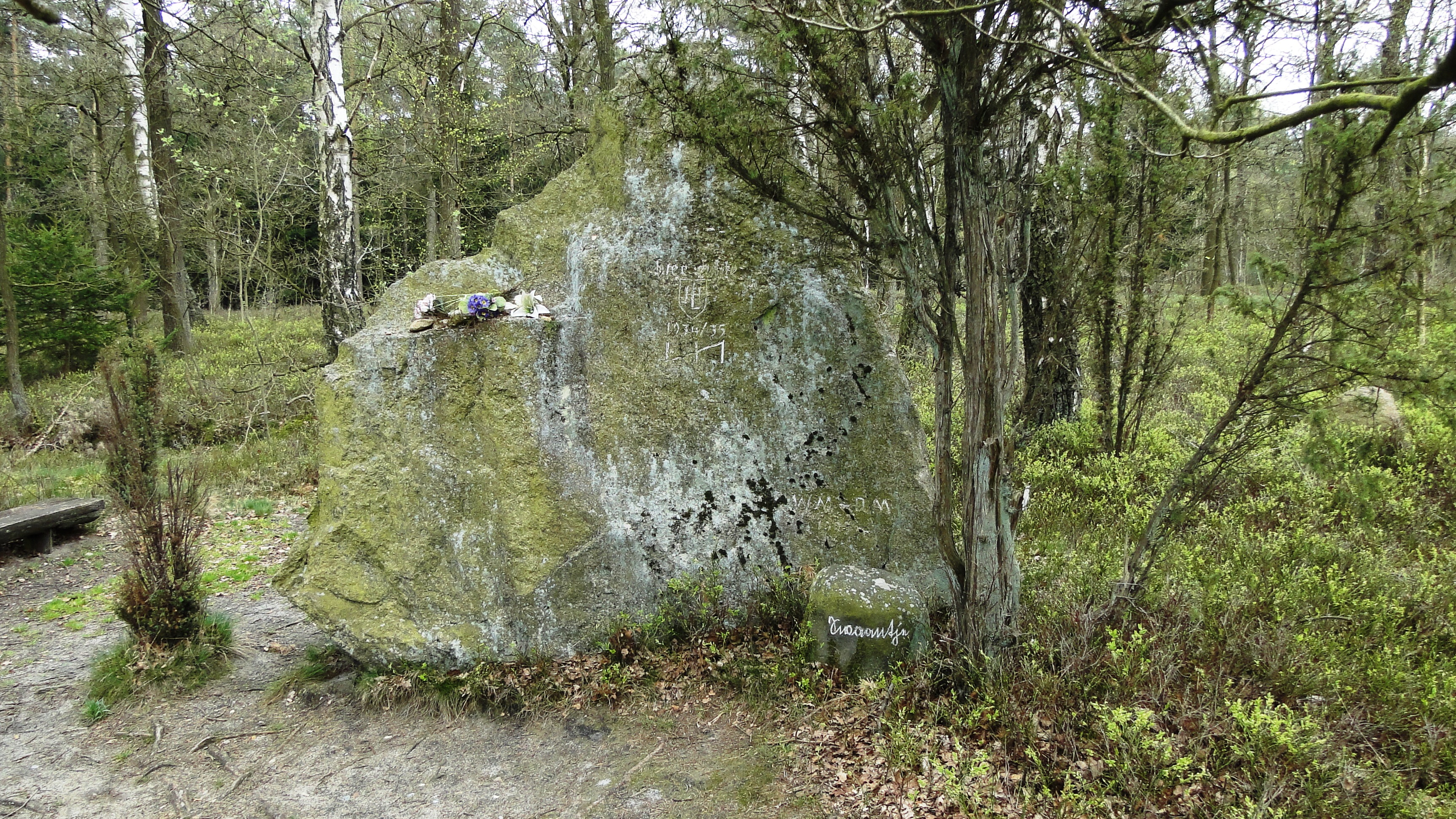
Monument marking the spot where the purported remains of Hermann Löns were buried late in 1934 near Barrl.

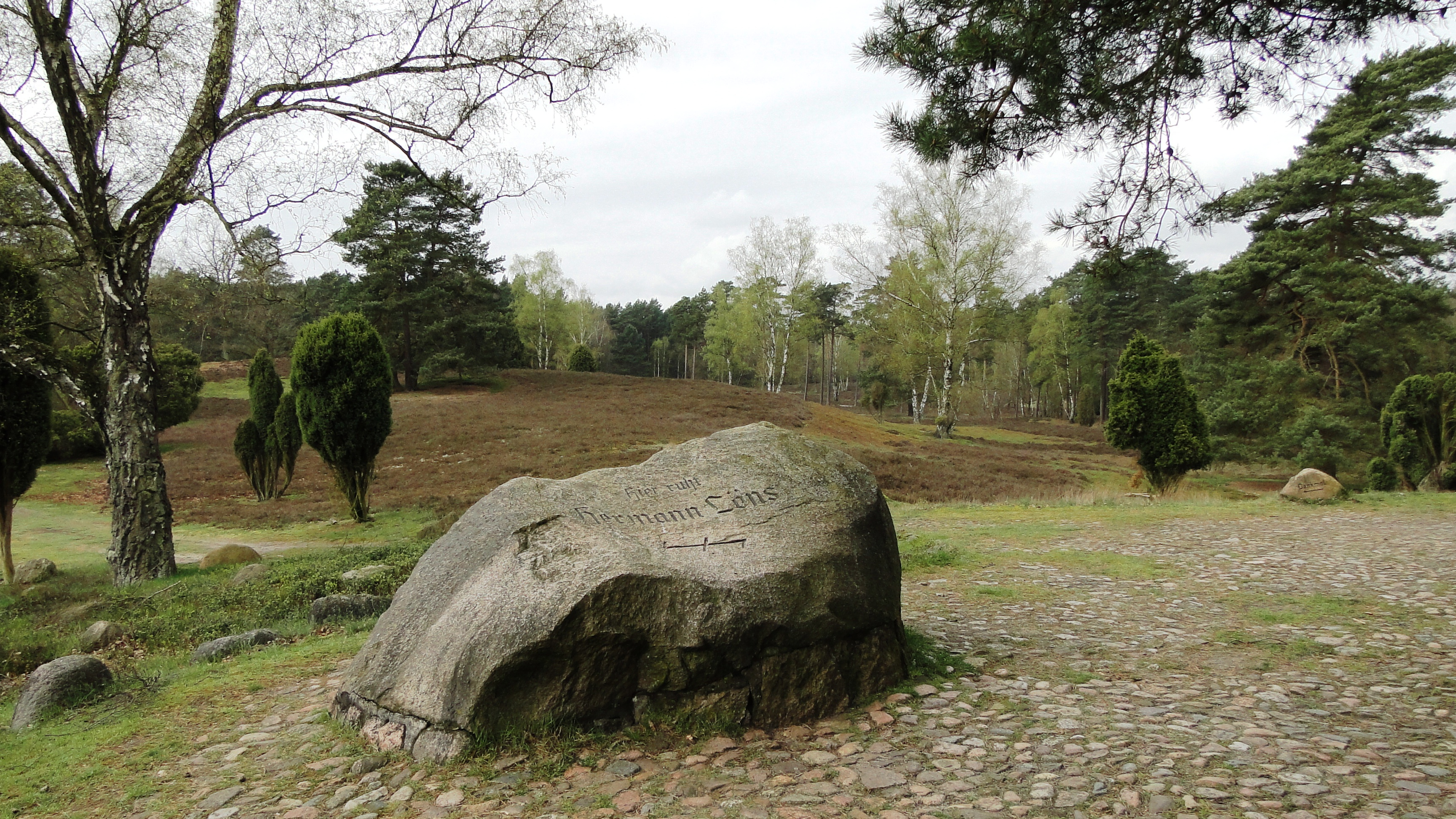
The "Lönsgrab" near Walsrode where the body was reburied in 1935.

Löns' books continued to sell well after his death. By 1934, they had reached an overall circulation of 2.5 million books. By 1938, the The Warwolf had sold more than 500,000 copies (reaching 865,000 copies by 1945). This made him one of the most successful authors in Germany at the time.

Löns had considered himself as a poet of nature and he had argued eloquently for conservationism. He was co-initiator of the Heideschutzpark at Wilseder Berg which later grew into the Lüneburg Heath Nature Park, the first nature reserve in Germany. Löns combined these sentiments, based not least on the Heimatbewegung of the turn of the century (as represented by Adolf Bartels) with an increasingly radical nationalism, the racial concept of an "aristocratic peasantry", enmity towards the metropolis (Berlin) and xenophobia. His literary work has been categorised as part of the folkish philosophy, although his character was also one of intense individualism.

As some of his writings had included nationalistic ideas, he was considered by the National Socialists as one of their writers. Some parts of his works conformed well with the blood and soil ethos endorsed by National Socialist ideologues such as Walther Darre and Alfred Rosenberg, which lauded the peasantry and small rural communities as the true character of the German nation.

On 5 January 1933, a French farmer found the boots of a German soldier in one of his fields. With the help of the local sexton, he uncovered a skeleton and identification tag. The sexton buried the body in an individual grave in a German graveyard near Loivre. It took almost 18 months for the tag to reach Berlin via the German embassy in France. This tag was subsequently lost during an Allied bombing raid on Berlin; an extant photograph of it does not allow a definite conclusion on whether the tag said "F.R." (Füselier-Regiment) or "I.R." (Infanterie-Regiment). However, on 8 May 1934, the newspaper Völkische Beobachter announced that the grave of Löns had been discovered. In October 1934, at the behest of Adolf Hitler, Löns' purported body was exhumed and brought to Germany. There was not any medical examination to try to verify that these were indeed the remains of the writer.

In 1919, several bodies had been exhumed in the vicinity of the area where Löns was killed and transferred to the war cemetery at Luxembourg. From there they were moved to a mass grave near Loivre, where they remain to this day, according to the Volksbund Deutsche Kriegsgräberfürsorge, a charity. It is quite possible that Löns' remains were among them.

The exhumed body of Löns was supposed to be buried in the Lüneburg Heath, given his association with the area. However, the exact location of his new grave posed problems. The initial plan to bury him at the Sieben Steinhäuser, a megalithic site, was abandoned since the military at the time had (still secret) plans to establish the military training facility Bergen in the area. An alternative site near Wilseder Berg was rejected due to concerns about the environmental effect of large numbers of visitors to the grave. Finding a suitable burial place became an issue for the top echelons of the regime, including Hermann Göring, Rudolf Heß, Joseph Goebbels, Werner von Blomberg and even Adolf Hitler.

On 30 November 1934, members of the Sturmabteilung (SA), apparently on orders from Goebbels, removed the remains from the graveyard chapel in Fallingbostel where they were awaiting reburial. They buried them near the roadside of what was then Reichsstrasse 3 (now Bundesstrasse 3 or B3) south of Barrl, near the area known presently as Reinsehlen Camp. However, on 2 August 1935, the anniversary of the start of World War I, on the initiative of von Blomberg, Minister of War, the Reichswehr exhumed the remains and transferred them to the Tietlinger Wacholderhain near Walsrode, where an earlier (1929) memorial had been erected, for a ceremonial reburial.

== Legacy ==
After 1945, Löns remained a bestselling author. The company that published most of his works estimated that by 1966 they had sold 7.5 million books written by him.

Composer Pauline Volkstein (1849-1925) set Löns' text to music in her lieder.

The 1932 movie Grün ist die Heide (lit. Green Is The Heath) was based on Löns' writings. It was remade with great commercial success in 1951, featuring Sonja Ziemann and Rudolf Prack, and again in 1972.

In 1956, Dieter Borsche featured as Löns in Rot ist die Liebe, a German movie based on Löns' autobiography Das zweite Gesicht.

== Memorials ==
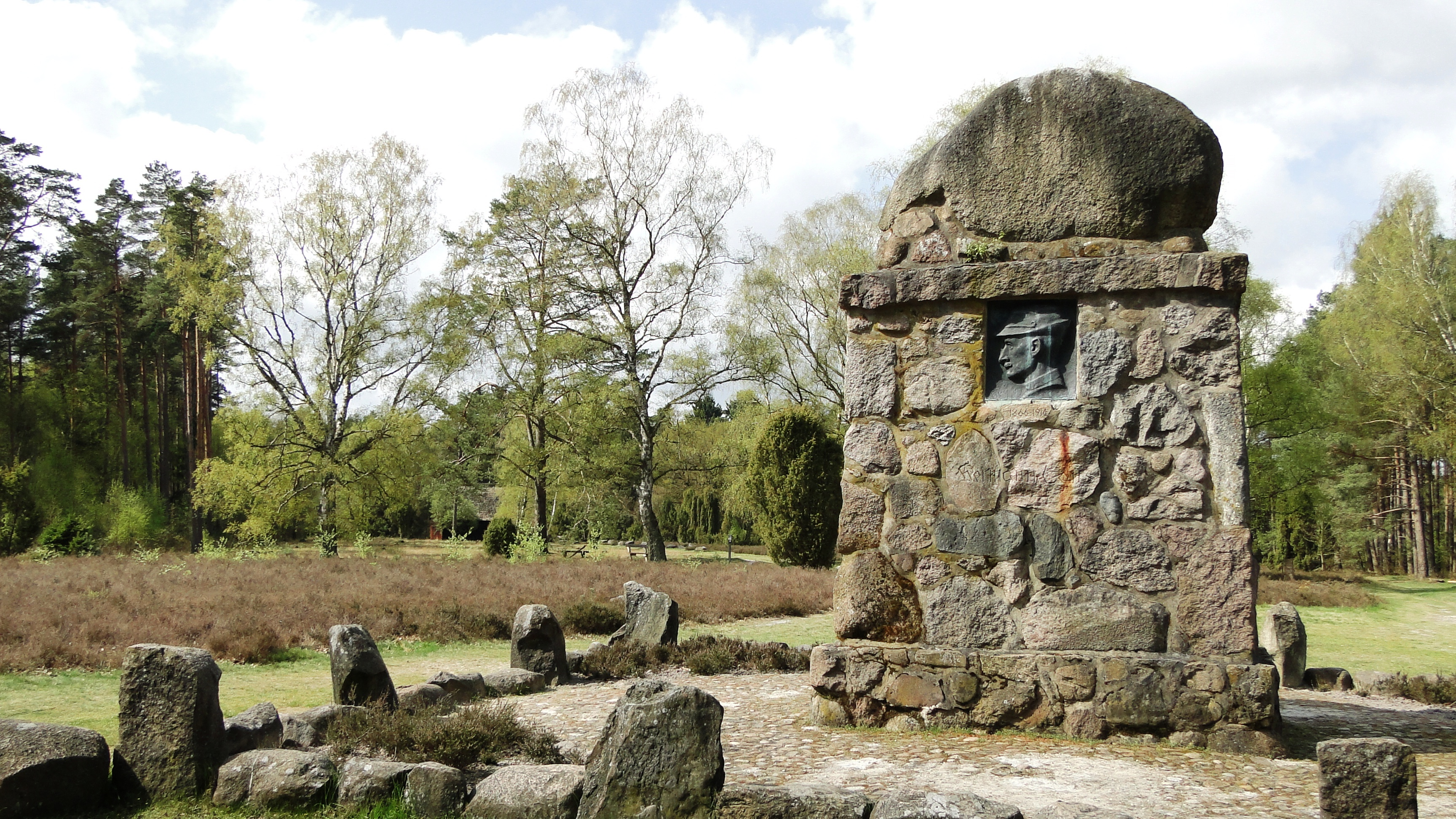
Memorial to Hermann Löns near Müden

There are 113 memorials total to Löns in Germany plus eight in Austria and 19 in other countries. Additionally, 247 streets and roads in Germany have been named for him. Twelve schools have his name. Finally, there is Hermann Löns Stadium at Paderborn.

== Bibliography ==
- Mein goldenes Buch, 1901
- Ausgewählte Werke von Fritz von der Leine, 1902
- Mein braunes Buch, 1906
- Mümmelmann, 1909
- Contributions to Lebensbilder aus der Tierwelt (edited by Hermann Meerwarth), 1910–1912
- Mein blaues Buch, 1909
- Der letzte Hansbur, 1909
- Dahinten in der Haide, 1910
- Der Wehrwolf, 1910
- Der kleine Rosengarten, 1911, from which the song "Auf der Lüneburger Heide" was derived
- Das zweite Gesicht, 1912
- Auf der Wildbahn, 1912
- Mein buntes Buch, 1913
- Die Häuser von Ohlendorf, 1913
