= Don't Ask My Heart =

1952 film

- Directed by: Paul Martin
- Written by: Tibor Yost; Paul Martin
- Produced by: Willie Hoffmann-Andersen
- Starring: Willy Birgel; Heidemarie Hatheyer; Maria Holst
- Cinematography: Karl Löb; Fritz Arno Wagner
- Edited by: Hermann Ludwig
- Music by: Willy Schmidt-Gentner
- Production company: Apollo-Film
- Distributed by: Deutsche London-Film
- Release date: 28 August 1952
- Running time: 100 minutes
- Country: West Germany
- Language: German

Don't Ask My Heart (German: Mein Herz darfst du nicht fragen) is a 1952 West German drama film directed by Paul Martin and starring Willy Birgel, Heidemarie Hatheyer and Maria Holst. It was shot at the Tempelhof Studios in West Berlin. The film's sets were designed by the art directors Hans Jürgen Kiebach and Gabriel Pellon

== Synopsis ==
In 1945 following the Soviet Union's capture and annexation of East Prussia, Anna Lohmann and her young son flee with other refugees but become separated in the turmoil. He is adopted by an aristocrat couple who raise him under the name Peter on their estate. After three years in displaced persons camps Anna gets a job at the estate where she recognises her son. However, in a court case she is unable to prove he is her son, as the now five year-old has no memory of her.

Desperate, Anna kidnaps her son and takes him to Hamburg. As he grows ill from the hardships they have to endure, she begins to question whether taking him away from his adoptive parents was the right decision.

== Cast ==
- Willy Birgel as Herr von Birkhausen
- Heidemarie Hatheyer as Anna Lohmann
- Maria Holst as Clarissa von Birkhausen
- Ewald Balser as Gerichts-Vorsitzender
- Paul Klinger as Paul Gerber
- Paul Hörbiger as Geheimrat Hollbach
- Rudolf Platte as Schmittke
- Oskar Sima as Morawski
- Ernst Waldow as Dr. Kuhnen - Anwalt
- Hilde Körber as Frau Bethke
- Loni Heuser as Nurse
- Ethel Reschke as Wally
- Otto Gebühr as Alter Bauer
- Paul Westermeier as Herr Bethke
- Herbert Wilk as Pfarrer
- Ernst Stahl-Nachbaur as Professor
- Otz Tollen as Diener
- Wolfgang Mahnke as Peter von Birkhausen
- Georg Dücker as Dr. Marlin - Anwalt
- Franz Fiedler
- Josef Kamper
- Charlotte Ander as Hausangestellte
- Gerhard Bienert as Wachtmeister
- Ernst Dernburg as Arzt
- Ida Perry
- Georg A. Profé

== Bibliography ==
- James Robert Parish. Film Actors Guide. Scarecrow Press, 1977.
