= When the Young Wine Blossoms (1943 film) =

1943 film

- Parents Otto Gebühr and Henny Porten and their three daughters Geraldine Katt, Else von Möllendorff and Marina von Ditmar.
- Directed by: Fritz Kirchhoff
- Written by: Bjørnstjerne Bjørnson (play: Når den ny vin blomstrer); Per Schwenzen; Heinz Thomas
- Produced by: Eduard Kubat
- Starring: Henny Porten; Otto Gebühr; René Deltgen
- Cinematography: Herbert Körner
- Edited by: Elisabeth Pewny
- Music by: Georg Haentzschel; Eduard Künneke
- Production company: Terra Film
- Distributed by: Deutsche Filmvertriebs
- Release date: 24 September 1943
- Running time: 80 minutes
- Country: Germany
- Language: German

When the Young Wine Blossoms (German: Wenn der junge Wein blüht) is a 1943 German comedy film directed by Fritz Kirchhoff and starring Henny Porten, Otto Gebühr and René Deltgen. It was based on a play by the Norwegian writer Bjørnstjerne Bjørnson which had previously been adapted into a 1927 German silent film of the same title.

The film's sets were designed by the art directors Franz Bi and Bruno Lutz. It was shot in various locations across Germany including the Seddiner See and the city of Hamburg.

== Synopsis ==
An interfering mother seeks husbands for her three daughters as they come of marriageable age. However, she pays no attention to her daughters' feelings until the eventual intervention of her husband manages to bring things to a happy conclusion.

== Cast ==
- Henny Porten as Elisa Arvik
- Otto Gebühr as Wilhelm Arvik
- René Deltgen as Kapitän Tonning
- Marina von Ditmar as Marna Arvik
- Geraldine Katt as Alberta Arvik
- Else von Möllendorff as Helene Arvik
- Hans Zesch-Ballot as Dr. Hall
- Marina Ried as Astrid
- Peter Elsholtz as Reeder Karstens
- Wilhelm König as Ulrik Jörgensen, Maler
- Eduard von Winterstein as Petersen
- Fritz Staudte as Roll
- Paul Rehkopf as Lorenz
- Claire Reigbert as Tante Anna
- Else Ehser as Sophie
- Ingeborg Stoldt as Magd
- Günther Ballier as Ausstellungsleiter
- Else Reval as Dicke Dame

== Bibliography ==
- Bock, Hans-Michael & Bergfelder, Tim. The Concise Cinegraph: Encyclopaedia of German Cinema. Berghahn Books, 2009.
