= Erich Palme =

- Born: 19 September 1894; Dresden, Kingdom of Saxony, German Empire
- Died: 5 June 1971 (aged 76); West Berlin, West Germany
- Occupations: Producer, Editor, Director
- Years active: 1932-1955 (film)

Erich Palme (1894–1971) was a German film editor, producer and assistant director.

== Selected filmography ==
=== Editor ===
- The Black Forest Girl (1933)
- Wild Cattle (1934)
- The Two Seals (1934)
- Lessons in Love (1935)
- His Late Excellency (1935)
- A Doctor of Conviction (1936)
- A Strange Guest (1936)
- The Beaver Coat (1937)
- Doctor Crippen (1942)
- A Man Like Maximilian (1945)
- Mailman Mueller (1953)

=== Producer ===
- The Ways of Love Are Strange (1937)
- The Merciful Lie (1939)
- In the Temple of Venus (1948)

== Bibliography ==
- Langford, Michelle. Directory of World Cinema: Germany. Intellect Books, 2012.
