= Chased by the Devil =

1950 film directed by Viktor Tourjansky

- Directed by: Viktor Tourjansky
- Written by: Emil Burri; Victor De Fast; Viktor Tourjansky
- Produced by: Georg Witt
- Starring: Hans Albers; Willy Birgel; Lil Dagover; Maria Holst
- Cinematography: Josef Illig; Franz Koch
- Edited by: Lisbeth Neumann
- Music by: Franz Grothe
- Production companies: Albers Tourjansky-Film; Bavaria Film
- Distributed by: Bavaria Film
- Release date: 24 October 1950
- Running time: 100 minutes
- Country: West Germany
- Language: German

Chased by the Devil (German: Vom Teufel gejagt) is a 1950 West German crime film directed by Viktor Tourjansky and starring Hans Albers, Willy Birgel and Lil Dagover.

It was shot at the Bavaria Studios in Munich and on location around the city. The film's sets were designed by the art directors Franz Bi and Botho Hoefer.

== Plot ==
A doctor discovers a new medical cure with dangerous side effects, and takes the drug himself to test its limitations.

== Cast ==
- Hans Albers as Dr. Blank
- Willy Birgel as Dr. Fingal
- Lil Dagover as Frau Dakar
- Maria Holst as Dr. Cora Berndsen
- Heidemarie Hatheyer as Maria Hendrix
- Alexander Golling as Martin Karper
- Heinrich Gretler as Paul Hendrix
- Joseph Offenbach as Kommissar Beerbohm
- Otto Wernicke as Herr Dakar
- Walter Janssen
- Herbert Kroll
- Georg Lehn
- Karl Schaidler
- Arnulf Schroder
- Fritz Benscher
- Harald Mannl
- Edith Schultze-Westrum as Schwester Grete
- Ernst Stahl-Nachbaur as Professor Schmederlein
- Wolf Harro as Zollbeamter
- Alfons Kiechle as Zollinspektor
- Peter Russ as Pfleger 1
- Dietrich Thoms as Pfleger 2

== Bibliography ==
- Hake, Sabine (2001). Popular Cinema of the Third Reich. Austin: University of Texas Press. ISBN 978-0-292-73458-6.
