= Everything for Gloria =

1941 film directed by Carl Boese

- German film poster
- German: Alles für Gloria
- Directed by: Carl Boese
- Written by: Friedrich Lorenz (play); Alfred Möller (play); Fritz Rau; Johannes Riemann; Carl Boese
- Produced by: Rüdiger von Hirschberg
- Starring: Leo Slezak; Laura Solari; Johannes Riemann; Lizzi Waldmüller
- Cinematography: Eduard Hoesch
- Edited by: Willy Zeyn
- Music by: Anton Profes
- Production company: Deka Film
- Release date: 25 October 1941
- Running time: 94 minutes
- Country: Germany
- Language: German

Everything for Gloria (German: Alles für Gloria) is a 1941 German romantic comedy film directed by Carl Boese and starring Leo Slezak, Laura Solari and Johannes Riemann. The film was shot at the Cinecittà in Rome, and marked the German debut of the Italian actress Laura Solari.

== Plot ==
The ambitious female chief executive of a gramophone record company slowly finds herself falling in love with the company's head of production.

== Partial cast ==
- Leo Slezak as chamber singer Möbius
- Laura Solari as Regine Möbius
- Johannes Riemann as Dr. Herbert Gerlach
- Lizzi Waldmüller as Anita Rodino
- Hans Fidesser as Fernando Rodino
- O. E. Hasse as Dr. Heinz
- Henry Lorenzen as Max-Egon Schuster-Köhler
- Erika Helmke as Hidegard Schuster-Köhler
- Hermann Pfeiffer as Franz Momber
- Herbert Weissbach as Eduard Wiesel, acoustician
- Harald Foehr-Waldeck as Erich
- Bert Schmidt-Maris as Viktor
