= The Murder Trial of Doctor Jordan =

1949 film

- Directed by: Erich Engels
- Written by: Wolf Neumeister; Erich Engels
- Produced by: Heinz Rühmann; Alf Teichs
- Starring: Rudolf Fernau; Maria Holst; Margarete Haagen
- Cinematography: Werner Krien
- Edited by: Gertrud Hinz-Nischwitz
- Music by: Wolfgang Zeller
- Production company: Comedia-Film
- Distributed by: Schorcht Filmverleih
- Release date: 27 October 1949
- Running time: 85 minutes
- Country: West Germany
- Language: German

The Murder Trial of Doctor Jordan (German: Mordprozeß Dr. Jordan) is a 1949 West German crime film directed by Erich Engels and starring Rudolf Fernau, Maria Holst, and Margarete Haagen. It was shot at the Wiesbaden Studios in Hesse. The film's sets were designed by the art directors Kurt Herlth and Carl Ludwig Kirmse.

== Cast ==
- Rudolf Fernau as Tropenarzt Dr. Jordan
- Maria Holst as Leonie Leborius
- Margarete Haagen as Frau Leborius
- Mila Kopp as Livia Mantuzza
- Dorothea Wieck as Constanze Jordan
- Kurt Waitzmann as Defense lawyer Dr. Lehnhardt
- Axel Ivers as Prosecutor Dr. Radtke
- Theodor Danegger as Vater Jordan
- Martha Ziegler as Schwester des alten Jordan
- Hubert von Meyerinck as Wedekind
- Berthold Ebbecke as Kriminalkommissar
- Rolf Weih as Assessor Werner
- Erwin Kleist as Kriminalkommissar Keilholz
- Hilde Willer as Frau von Rotter
- Sonia Korty as Frau Treffs
- Adalbert Gausche as Häftling Willi
- Willi Umminger as Droschkenkutscher Scheibele
- Viktor Hospach as Meyer
- Grete Wurm as Dienstmädchen Lina
- Mathilde Smolny-Heerdt as Frau Hübner
- Maria Avianus
- Heinrich Berg
- Erna Buck
- Egon Clauder
- Gerhard Geisler
- Wolfgang Jarnach
- Ingolf Kuntze
- Theodor Loos
- Max Mairich
- Katharina Mayberg
- Marieluise Riexinger
- Ernst Rotmund
- Hans Rusch
- Evelyn Sichert
- Otto Wenke

== Bibliography ==
- Bergfelder, Tim (2005) [2004]. International Adventures: German Popular Cinema and European Co-Productions in the 1960s. New York: Berghahn Books. ISBN 978-1-57181-539-2.
