= The Trip to Marrakesh =

1949 film directed by Richard Eichberg

- Theatrical film poster
- German: Die Reise nach Marrakesch
- Directed by: Richard Eichberg
- Written by: Benno Vigny (play)
- Produced by: Wilhelm Sperber
- Starring: Luise Ullrich; Maria Holst; Karl Ludwig Diehl
- Cinematography: Josef Illig; Franz Koch
- Edited by: Anneliese Schönnenbeck
- Music by: Theo Mackeben
- Production company: Merkur Film
- Distributed by: Herzog Film
- Release date: 21 December 1949
- Running time: 99 minutes
- Country: West Germany
- Language: German

The Trip to Marrakesh (German: Die Reise nach Marrakesch) is a 1949 West German drama film directed by Richard Eichberg and starring Luise Ullrich, Maria Holst and Karl Ludwig Diehl. It was Eichberg's last film and his first in a decade, having spent time abroad since his two part Indian-set The Tiger of Eschnapur.

== Production ==
The film is based on a play Le voyage à Marrakech by the French writer Benno Vigny.

It was made at the Bavaria Studios in Munich, with sets designed by the art directors Willi Herrmann and Heinrich Weidemann. Eichberg led a filming expedition to Morocco for location shooting. The final budget amounted to around one and half million deutschmarks.

== Release ==
It premiered in Munich on 21 December 1949, aiming for the lucrative Christmas-time release market. The film was received with general hostility from critics.

== Themes ==
While the film was in the same tradition as Eichberg's earlier films, with their exotic settings, it has drawn more notice for its underlying lesbian theme, which culminates in one female character shooting another dead.

== Main cast ==
- Luise Ullrich as Liliane
- Maria Holst as Armande Colbert
- Karl Ludwig Diehl as Professor Colbert
- Paul Dahlke as Henry Orliac
- Grethe Weiser as Loulou
- Ludwig Linkmann as Bobby
- Michael Korrontay as Jacques Bertal
- Günther Evers as Capitain Blanchard
- Viktor Afritsch as Ahmed Pasha
- Ernst Fritz Fürbringer as Jean
- Berthold Ebbecke as Dr. Grandler
- Ulrich Beiger as Mixer
