= Anneliese Schönnenbeck =

German film editor (1919–2020)

- Occupation: Editor
- Years active: 1944–1967

Anneliese Schönnenbeck was a German film editor.

== Selected filmography ==
- Große Freiheit Nr. 7 (1944)
- Tell the Truth (1946)
- And If We Should Meet Again (1947)
- Blocked Signals (1948)
- The Trip to Marrakesh (1949)
- King for One Night (1950)
- The Disturbed Wedding Night (1950)
- Love on Ice (1950)
- My Friend the Thief (1951)
- Poison in the Zoo (1952)
- Young Heart Full of Love (1953)
- Scandal at the Girls' School (1953)
- Salto Mortale (1953)
- Portrait of an Unknown Woman (1954)
- Hungarian Rhapsody (1954)
- Sky Without Stars (1955)
- Ludwig II (1955)
- If We All Were Angels (1956)
- Love from Paris (1957)
- Two Bavarians in the Jungle (1957)
- A Piece of Heaven (1957)
- A Song Goes Round the World (1958)
- Labyrinth (1959)
- The Hero of My Dreams (1960)
- Agatha, Stop That Murdering! (1960)

== Bibliography ==
- Langford, Michelle. Directory of World Cinema: Germany. Intellect Books, 2012.
