= The Warwolf =

1910 novel by Hermann Löns

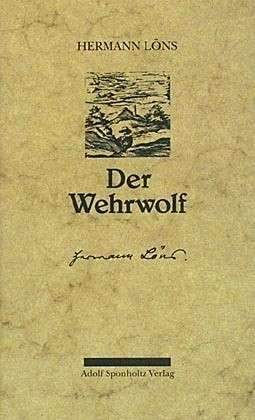
- Title page of the first edition
- Author: Hermann Löns
- Original title: Der Wehrwolf
- Translator: Robert Kvinnesland
- Language: German
- Genre: Historical fiction
- Publication date: 1910
- Publication place: Germany
- English publication date: 2006
- Media type: Print
- Pages: 244 (first edition)

The Warwolf: A Peasant Chronicle of the Thirty Years War (German: Der Wehrwolf. (Note: A portmanteau combining the German words for "defence" and "wolf"; usually translated into English as Warwolf) Eine Bauernchronik) is a novel by the German writer Hermann Löns, first published in 1910.

== Plot summary ==
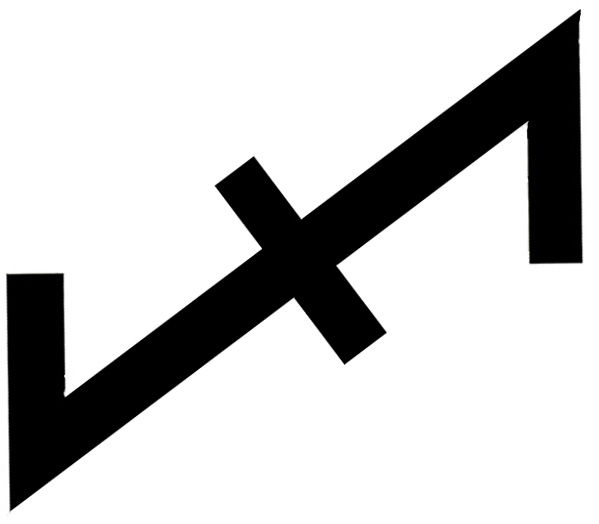
Harm Wulf's symbol, the wolfsangel

The Thirty Years' War is at its height while the peasantry suffers under countless marauders. The protagonist Harm Wulf, a peasant, lost his family in the first years of war; he becomes the defending Wulf (wehrender Wulf) by defending a hill fort and its surrounding carr with peasants hiding from the pillaging hordes. Harm Wulf gathers allies until 121 men are in the Alliance of the Wehrwolf. After peace is restored, Harm Wulf is a grim old man.

== Reception ==
Published in 1910, The Warwolf became a bestseller in Germany. The scholar Luke Springman connects it to a tendency of historical novels with German and Germanic subjects, popular among boys in the unified Germany, with earlier examples such as Joseph Victor von Scheffel's Ekkehard—first published in 1855 but only a major success after the unification—and the novels of Felix Dahn.

== See also ==
- Wolfsangel, an emblem used by the protagonist of the book
