= The Gypsy Baron (1962 film) =

1962 film

- German DVD cover
- German: Der Zigeunerbaron
- Directed by: Kurt Wilhelm
- Written by: Ignaz Schnitzer (libretto); Vineta Bastian-Klinger; Walter Supper; Tibor Yost; Heinz Oskar Wuttig; Mór Jókai (novel)
- Based on: The Gypsy Baron by Johann Strauss II
- Produced by: Kurt Ulrich; Heinz Willeg
- Cinematography: Willi Sohm
- Edited by: Martha Dübber
- Production companies: Berolina Film; CEC Films
- Distributed by: Constantin Film
- Release date: 28 September 1962
- Running time: 103 minutes
- Countries: France; West Germany
- Language: German

The Gypsy Baron (German: Der Zigeunerbaron) is a 1962 French-German operetta film directed by Kurt Wilhelm and starring Carlos Thompson, Heidi Brühl, and Willy Millowitsch. It is based on the 1885 operetta The Gypsy Baron.

The film was shot at the Spandau Studios in Berlin. Location filming took place in the Serbian capital Belgrade and in Varaždin, Croatia.

== Cast ==
- Carlos Thompson as Sandor von Barinkay, singing voice by Fritz Wunderlich
- Heidi Brühl as Arsena
- Willy Millowitsch as Kalman Zsupan
- Danièle Gaubert as Saffi, singing voice by Herta Talmar
- Félix Marten as Istvan Homonay
- Peer Schmidt as Ernö
- Ida Ehre as Czipra
- Pierre Parel as Pali, a gipsy
- Maurice Teynac as Carnero
- Stanislav Ledinek as Mischka
- Walter Gross as a judge
- Franz Muxeneder as a treasure digger
- Hugo Lindinger as a treasure digger
- Ady Berber as a treasure digger
