= The Heath Is Green (1951 film) =

1951 West German film

- Film poster
- Directed by: Hans Deppe
- Written by: Hermann Löns (novel); Bobby E. Lüthge
- Produced by: Kurt Ulrich
- Starring: Sonja Ziemann; Rudolf Prack; Maria Holst; Willy Fritsch
- Cinematography: Kurt Schulz
- Edited by: Hermann Ludwig
- Music by: Alfred Strasser and others (Löns songs)
- Production company: Berolina Film
- Distributed by: Gloria Film
- Release date: 14 November 1951
- Running time: 90 minutes
- Country: West Germany
- Language: German
- Box office: 6.5 million DM

The Heath Is Green (German: Grün ist die Heide) is a 1951 West German drama film directed by Hans Deppe and starring Sonja Ziemann, Rudolf Prack, and Maria Holst.

== Plot ==
The film is set in the Lüneburg Heath region. The plot centers around a poacher (Lüder Lüdersen), a game warden (Walter Rainer) hunting the poacher, the murder of a police officer, and two love affairs. The main love affair and the main source of moral conflict is between the game keeper and the poacher's daughter (Helga Lüdersen). The film has a happy ending: the murderer is arrested and Helga and Walter become a couple.

== Cast ==
- Sonja Ziemann as Helga Lüdersen
- Rudolf Prack as Walter Rainer
- Maria Holst as Nora von Buckwitz
- Willy Fritsch as judge
- Hans Stüwe as Lüder Lüdersen
- Hans Richter as Hannes
- Otto Gebühr as Gottfried Lüdersen
- Oskar Sima as circus manager
- Kurt Reimann as Nachtigall
- Ludwig Schmitz as Tünnes
- Josef Sieber as Oberförster (head game warden)
- Margarete Haagen as Mrs. Lüdersen
- Else Reval as Frau Zirkusdirektor
- Karl Finkenzeller as Pistek
- Ernst Waldow as pharmacist

== Production ==
Grün ist die Heide is based on an eponymous novel by Hermann Löns. An earlier movie version was made in 1932.

Cinematography took place from 28 August to 16 September 1951 in the Lüneburg Heath and at Bleckede, and from 19 September to 26 September in the Tempelhof Studios in Berlin.

With around 16 million viewers, Grün ist die Heide became one of the most successful German films.

A third movie with the same name from 1972 was not a remake, but just used some of Löns' poems for song lyrics.

== Reception ==
The FSK gave the film a rating of "6 and up" and deemed it suitable for screening on public holidays.

The film premiered on 14 November 1951 at the Palast in Hanover. It was the most successful release of the 1951/1952 season in Germany. It is an example of the Heimatfilm genre of post-WWII West German cinema.

In 1952, it received the Bambi Award as the most successful film.
