= Gabriel Pellon =

German art director (1900–1975)

- Born: 10 December 1900; Metz, German Empire
- Died: 28 December 1975 (aged 75); Munich, Bavaria; West Germany
- Occupations: Artist, Art director
- Years active: 1929–1967 (film)

Gabriel Pellon (1900–1975) was a German painter and art director. Pellon was born in Metz, which was then part of the German Empire having been annexed from France at the end of the Franco-Prussian War. When Metz was later annexed by France, Pellon settled in Germany where he established himself as a leading designer of film sets.

== Selected filmography ==
- The Merry Wives of Vienna (1931)
- The Night Without Pause (1931)
- A City Upside Down (1933)
- Streak of Steel (1935)
- The Man Who Couldn't Say No (1938)
- Little County Court (1938)
- The Unfaithful Eckehart (1940)
- Lightning Around Barbara (1941)
- The Bath in the Barn (1943)
- A Flea in Her Ear (1943)
- Martina (1949)
- One Night Apart (1950)
- The Woman from Last Night (1950)
- The Black Forest Girl (1950)
- Dance Into Happiness (1951)
- Don't Ask My Heart (1952)
- Three Days of Fear (1952)
- Have Sunshine in Your Heart (1953)
- Everything for Father (1953)
- Diary of a Married Woman (1953)
- We'll Talk About Love Later (1953)
- My Sister and I (1954)
- The Big Star Parade (1954)
- The Great Test (1954)
- Love, Dance and a Thousand Songs (1955)
- The Star of Rio (1955)
- Fruit in the Neighbour's Garden (1956)
- Where the Ancient Forests Rustle (1956)
- My Sixteen Sons (1956)
- Beloved Corinna (1956)
- The Mad Bomberg (1957)
- The Copper (1958)
- Lilli (1958)
- The Invisible Dr. Mabuse (1962)

== Bibliography ==
- Shandley, Robert. Rubble Films: German Cinema In Shadow Of the Third Reich. Temple University Press, 2010.
