= Lizzi Waldmüller =

Austrian actress and singer

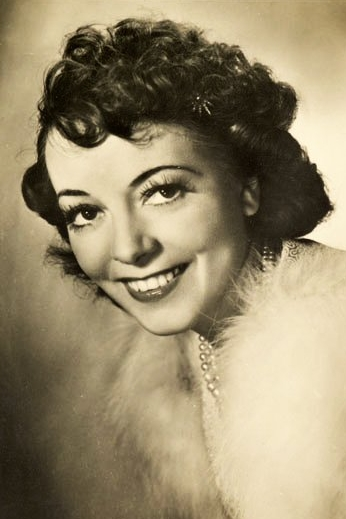
Lizzi Waldmüller

Lizzi Waldmüller (25 May 1904 in Knittelfeld, Styria – 8 April 1945 in Vienna) was an Austrian singer and actress whose breakthrough to stardom came through her role as Rachel in the Willi Forst movie Bel Ami in 1939.

Waldmüller had her theatre debut in Innsbruck in the 1920s, before finding success in Graz, Vienna and eventually abroad – in Germany. She became renowned through the Paul Lincke song 'Ich bin die Frau, von der man spricht' (I am the woman they're talking about). At the beginning of the 1930s, she played supporting roles next to stars such as Heinz Rühmann, Hans Albers and her husband Max Hansen, whom she divorced in 1938.

She died on 8 April 1945 in an air raid in Vienna, Austria, a month before the end of World War II. Her memorial can be found in Friedhof Hadersdorf-Weidlingau, Hadersdorf-Weidlingau, Penzing, Vienna.

== Filmography ==
- The Spanish Fly (1931)
- Strafsache van Geldern (1932, Case Van Geldern)
- Love at First Sight (1932)
- Laughing Heirs (1933)
- Peer Gynt (1934)
- Shipwrecked Max (1936)
- Bel Ami (1939)
- Traummusik (1940)
- Casanova heiratet (1940)
- Ritorno (1940)
- Mistress Moon (1941)
- Everything for Gloria (1941)
- The Night in Venice (1942)
- A Waltz with You (1943)
- Liebeskomödie (1943)
- Es lebe die Liebe (1944)
- A Man Like Maximilian (1945)
