= Grete Walter =

German resistance activist

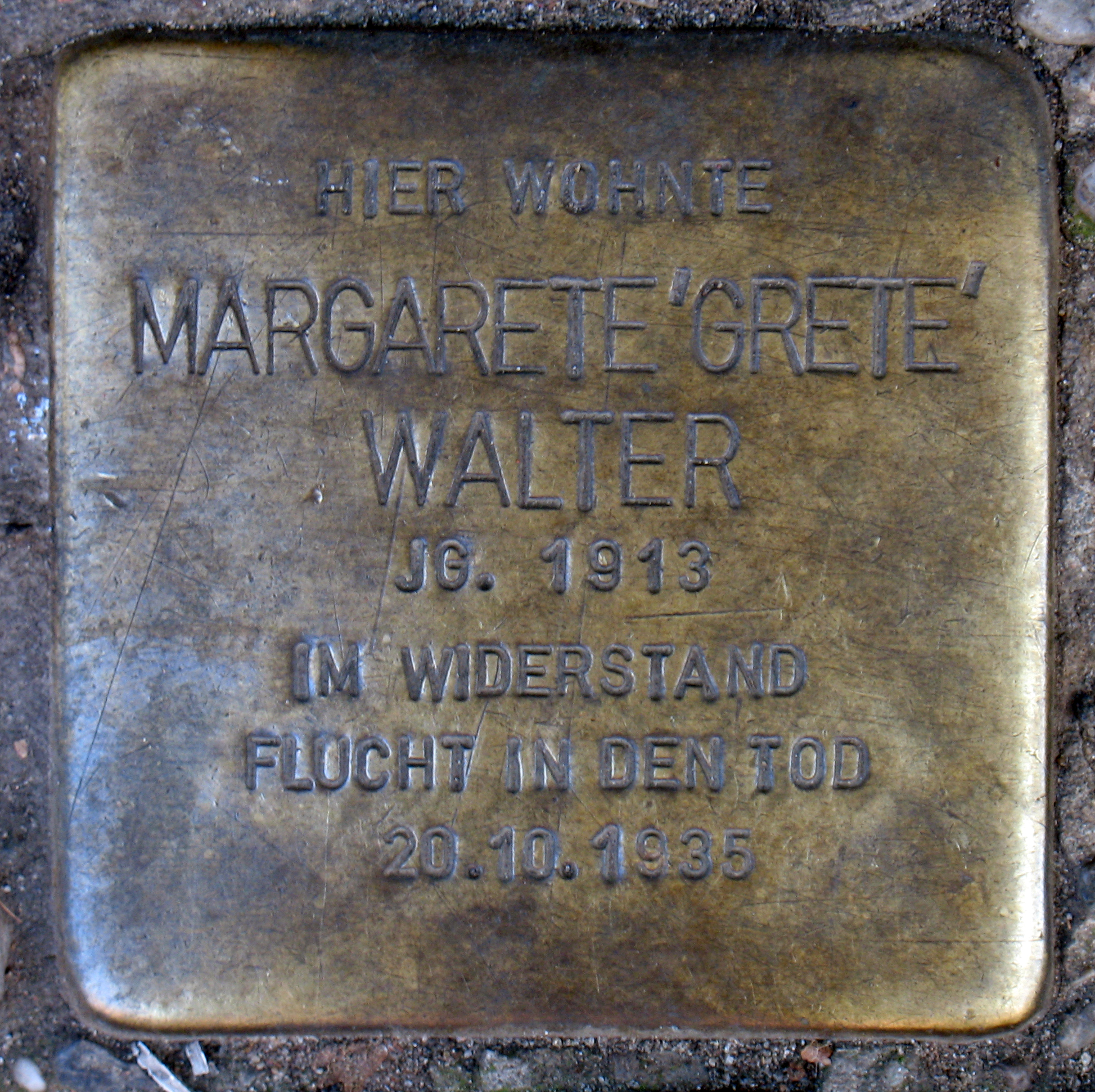
- On 14 November 2009 a Stolperstein memorial was fixed in the pavement outside the house in Berlin-Neukölln which was Grete Walter's home at the time of her final arrest.
- Born: Margarete Walter; 22 February 1913; Berlin-Neukölln, Germany
- Died: 21 October 1935 (aged 22); Reich Security Main Office, Prinz-Albrecht-Straße, Berlin, Germany
- Education: International Lenin School, Moscow, Soviet Union
- Occupations: Communist youth worker Office worker Factory worker Resistance activist

Grete Walter (22 February 1913 – 21 October 1935) was a German resistance activist during the Hitler years. She committed suicide by throwing herself from the third floor of a stairwell (Note: The police report states that she threw herself from a third floor washroom window, but a police commissar whom Grete Walter's sister quizzed the next day over what had happened said that she had jumped down the stairwell. There appears to be agreement that she jumped from the third floor.) following a particularly brutal interrogation session at the Security Services' Main Office in Berlin.

== Life ==
=== Provenance and early years ===
Margarete "Grete" Walter was born in Berlin, the second of her parents' three daughters. Her father was a coach driver. Her mother worked as a domestic servant. Later her father was able to set himself up in business with a little dairy. Money was tight and the work running the dairy was hard, but while they were young, the girls' mother was able to focus on their upbringing. She ensured that the girls attended school regularly and prepared for secure futures. Grete attended a business-focused secondary school (...Handelsschule) and trained for office work. She was still only 15 when she took her first job in 1928, starting out with the Berlin wholesale foods operation of the venerable foods conglomerate, Kathreiner AG.

Grete Walter appears to have inherited her politics from her mother: two of her maternal uncles were metal workers and, like many working in that sector, Communist Party members. There are strong indications that her father, by contrast, was either uninterested in politics or else that, in common with many "small businessmen", his political views tended in a very different direction from those of his wife and her brothers. 1928, the year during which she took her first job, was also the year in which Grete Walter joined the Young Communists. She eagerly participated in the creation of a Young Communist cell at her work place: the focus for the group, inevitably, was on recruiting the youngest in the workforce, including apprentices. Walter also applied her enthusiasm and writing skills in "Die Kathreiner Mühle", a news sheet distributed to colleagues which did not hesitate to criticise the company's methods. The publication appears to have been a team effort, but she certainly contributed both to the texts and to its production and distribution. The extent to which management were aware of her involvement only became apparent a little later. The Great Depression after the Wall Street crash arrived with great force in western Europe: in Germany, in particular, industrial demand slumped and unemployment surged. In 1930 Kathreiner AG imposed job cuts. The energetic young communist was among the first to be lose her job.

=== The (political) opportunities of unemployment ===
Walter experienced great difficulty in her search for another job. There are suggestions that she had been informally blacklisted. She did, however, find herself with more time on her hands for political activities. She undertook "communist youth work" in Berlin-Neukölln, the city quarter in which she lived. She was an enthusiastic singer and pianist, and particularly loved to play with the workers' children belonging to the Young Spartacus League, In 1930, two years after joining the Young Communists (with which she would continue to engage actively), Grete Walter joined the Communist Party itself, apparently without daring to tell her parents that she had done so. Her political talents and commitment had, however, been noticed elsewhere. She received and happily accepted an invitation passed on the by Young Communists' Central Committee that she should spend a year in Moscow. During 1930/31 Grete Walter spent a year in Moscow, attending the International Lenin School and seeing for herself the first country in the world where a genuine attempt to build a true socialist society was under way.

She returned to Neukölln in the summer of 1931 and became a member of the Young Communists district leadership team ("Bezirksleitung"). The economic situation had deteriorated further, with millions unemployed, and mass-poverty an intensifying problem. Politics were spilling onto the streets and becoming ever more polarised. With uniformed National Socialist populists an increasing presence on the city streets, and Grete Walter's own political involvement apparently no secret to anyone, it remained impossible for her to find paid employment. Her youthful political career progressed, however: she was soon recruited onto the Young Communists regional leadership team for Berlin, while continuing her work with children. It was, according to one source, a reflection of her positivity and joyous energy that the children called her "Pferdchen" ("Little Horse"). Neukölln was known as a district in which many Communists and Socialists were living: during 1932 it was increasingly on the receiving end of visits from gangs of National Socialist paramilitaries. Fights were not infrequent. With her comrades Grete Walter was successful in ensuring that working class youngsters in the area were not excessively influenced by the fascists. It became evident early in 1933 that her involvement had nevertheless been noted.

=== 1933 ===
At the start of 1933 Walter was herself elected to membership of the Young Communist Central Committee, becoming its youngest member. At the same time the Hitler government, exploiting the political polarisation and parliamentary deadlock which the National Socialists had done much to exacerbate, took power and lost no time in transforming Germany into a one-party dictatorship. Political activity in support of the Communist Party immediately became dangerous and after a few weeks also illegal. But Walter continued to distribute (illegal) publications including "Die Kathreiner-Mühle" and "Rotes Kabel". A rapid wave of arrests took place on 27/28 February 1933, the night of the Reichstag Fire and during the ensuing 24 hours. Grete Walter was among those rounded up, becoming one of the first women in Berlin to be arrested by the security services following the Hitler take-over. The questioning lasted for a number of days: the beatings becoming increasingly violent and the complementary tortures ever more brutal. Her interrogators wanted names: Walter remained silent. Following her release her mother spent several days treating her cuts and bruises with compresses.

=== Kabelwerk Oberspree ===
Several weeks after her release Grete Walter finally found a job, employed as a winder ("Wicklerin") at the Kabelwerk Oberspree at that time was still owned by the AEG conglomerate). (Note: The factory ended the war in the Soviet sector of Berlin, and any assets that had not been destroyed were formally transferred to Soviet ownership in 1946. The factory subsequently passed into the hand of a state-owned business ("Volkseigener Betrieb") in the German Democratic Republic.) She very soon teamed up with co-workers to organise anti-government resistance. Their activities included the setting up of an illegal youth group which at slightly irregular intervals produced and distributed a version of the "Rotes Kabel" newspaper. The authors of the newspaper repeatedly highlighted government lies and hypocrisies. The destruction by government of political and social rights together with democratic liberties was constantly condemned. Walter also campaigned on behalf of colleagues dismissed from the factory because they had been identified as Jewish. She was one of those who carefully distributed copies of the "communist company newspaper" in the lockers and to the work stations of colleagues.

It is impossible to know how much the company knew of Walter's illegal political activities in the factory, or how uniform the attitudes of individual company managers would have been to the extent of whatever they did know. The security services clearly had their suspicions from somewhere, and during June 1934 they re-arrested her. Again, they wanted the names of fellow activists: they also wanted to know more about Walter's own activities. Thanks to the loyal discretion of her comrades and her own refusal to succumb to their interrogation techniques, they were unable to prove anything against her, however, and she was again released. According to at least one source she was arrested several times during 1934, and badly tortured. Her sister Lisa later testified movingly to her physically broken state when she returned home following one of these interrogation sessions, but in terms of divulging what the security services wished to hear, she never broke, and once released she would return to her "illegal [political] work".

=== Conscription for farm work ===
Early in 1935 Walter was conscripted for farm work and sent to Wahlendow (Anklam), a remote village a couple of kilometers inland, along the coastal flatlands of Pomerania. Her fellow farm girl conscripts elected her as their "Vertrauensmädchen", an informal representational role which evidently involved presenting the concerns of the young people to those in a position to do something about them. She secured management compliance by management with working hours regulations, adequate food and reasonable accommodation. Her effectiveness as an impromptu negotiator was enhanced by her experience in antifascist resistance groups. Walter succeeded in keeping in touch with contacts in Berlin and abroad, although the modalities underpinning these networking activities are unclear. It has become evident that her correspondence was monitored to the police, and she evidently remained the object of suspicion on the part of the authorities.

=== Arrest and suicide ===
It is not clear whether Grete Walter's co-workers on the farm knew about her Communist connections: she certainly made no secret of her rejection of Germany's recently installed fascist government. Obviously one of those with whom she shared these opinions was a spy, who passed on details of Walter's opinions to the security services. Grete Walter was arrested again on 9 October 1935, and immediately conveyed back to Berlin. On the afternoon of 21 October 1935, as Grete's sister Johanna wrote, "a police official ... appeared before my mother and delivered a telegramme: 'Daughter Margaret Walter arrested and committed suicide'". The next morning Lisa and Johanna, the two surviving sisters, visited the vast court complex at Berlin-Moabit, in order to try and find out more. It turned out that during the twelve days between her arrest and her suicide Grete Walter had been subjected to intensive and sustained torture by the security services: although details remain sketchy it was inferred that it was torture that drove Grete Walter, still aged only 22, to commit suicide. Another source spells out the conclusion that it was the terror that she might be forced, through torture, to betray resistance activist comrades, that drove Grete Walter to take her own life. According to another source, it remains unknown whether she was actually tortured during those twelve days, but on 21 October 1935 records indicate that she had made a partial confession a few hours before fatally launching herself from the third floor during a break in her interrogation.

== Public celebration after 1945 ==
During the twelve Hitler years Grete Walter's fate was little known, but her family preserved her memory. It is a tribute to her sisters' courage in finding out as much as they did about what had happened that after 1945 her story became more widely known. By this time the western two thirds of Germany was divided into four military occupation zones. Berlin was surrounded by a large region administered as the Soviet occupation zone which in October 1949 was relaunched as the Soviet sponsored German Democratic Republic (East Germany), a new kind of German one-party dictatorship. Grete Walter was a well documented larger than life attractive young woman, barely more than a child, widely loved and admired during her lifetime, which had been topped off with a heroic death triggered by the abusive conduct of the Nazi security services.

- There is a "Grete-Walter-Straße" ("Grete Walter Street") in Milz and another in Cottbus. Berlin-Prenzlauer Berg has a "Margarete-Walter-Straße". A relatively recent residential development in Schleibnitz, a village in the Wanzleben-Börde administrative district, a short distance to the west of Magdeburg, also includes a "Grete-Walther-Straße", complete with the erroneous insertion of an "h" in the name "Walt(h)er".
- Between 1949 and 1989 seven East German Polytechnic Secondary Schools were named after Grete Walter, in Berlin-Weissensee, Geising, Georgenthal, Greifswald, Schwarzheide, Schwepnitz and Wustrow
- In the school yard at the Polytechnic Secondary School in Greifswald-Eldena a memorial stone was also placed, bearing the inscription "The antifascist resistance fighters", which on 4 February 1978 was formally "consecrated" to the honoured memory of the woman after the school had been named. The memorial was removed when the old school buildings were controversially torn down and replaced with a shopping centre, following reunification, however.
- There are children's care institutions named after Grete Walter in Wismar and Polvitz, along with a youth hostel in Stralsund and a children's holiday centre in Sebnitz.
- In the "VEB Kabelwerk Oberspree", which occupied the space taken by the vast AEG Cable factory when Grete Walter worked there during 1933–1935, a State Youth Organisation (FDJ) branch was installed and named after her.
- Werk für Fernsehelektronik, the huge television manufacturer in Berlin-Oberschöneweide, had a company holiday complex in Dierhagen-Neuhaus on the North Sea coast that was named after Grete Walter.
- An Artur Becker type feeder trawler was recently named after her.
- In a little ceremony that took place on 14 November 2009, in response to an initiative by the VVN-BdA, the Cologne-based artist and Stolperstein ambassador, Gunter Demnig, fixed a Stolperstein memorial in the pavement/sidewalk outside the house at Fuldastraße 12 in Berlin-Neukölln which was Grete Walter's home at the time of her final arrest.
- In the Burg the "Jugendwerkhof", (Note: "Jugendwerkhof" translates loosely, but not completely misleadingly, as "Youth work house".) during the German Democratic Republic era, there was a group named after her.
