= Argila (1969 film) =

1969 film

- Directed by: Werner Schroeter
- Written by: Werner Schroeter
- Produced by: Werner Schroeter
- Starring: Carla Egerer; Magdalena Montezuma; Sigurd Salto; Gisela Trowe
- Cinematography: Werner Schroeter
- Edited by: Werner Schroeter
- Music by: Werner Schroeter
- Production company: Werner Schroeter Filmproduktion
- Release date: 7 March 1969
- Running time: 33 minutes
- Country: West Germany
- Language: German

Argila is a 1968 West German drama film directed by Werner Schroeter and starring Carla Egerer, Magdalena Montezuma and Sigurd Salto. The film was part of the developing New German Cinema movement, and along with Eika Katappa established Magdalena Montezuma as the star of German underground filmmaking.

== Plot ==
Three women around a mute man.

== Background ==
Beginner, Werner Schroeter, proceeds to a sophisticated setting of characters and images by a double projection, one in mute black and white, the other sound and in color, with a few seconds delay.

== Cast ==
- Carla Egerer
- Magdalena Montezuma
- Sigurd Salto
- Gisela Trowe

== Bibliography ==
- Elsaesser, Thomas. New German Cinema: A History. Macmillan Education, 1989.
