= Bodo Sperling =

German artist, painter and inventor (born 1952)

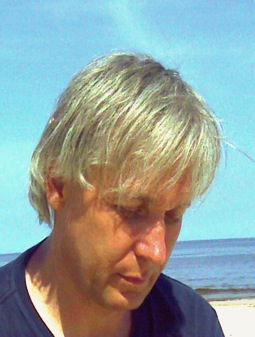
- Bodo Sperling
- Born: 6 May 1952 (age 74); Hanau, Hessen
- Education: University of Hannover, University of Tübingen
- Known for: Painting
- Notable work: Objectivism
- Movement: Heraclitus, Plato, Nagarjuna, Hegel, Conceptual Art

Bodo Sperling (born 6 May 1952) is a German artist, painter, and inventor.

== Life ==
Sperling grew up in Frankfurt am Main, Leipzig, Amsterdam and Berlin. He started his artistic career in Amsterdam. There he sold his pictures he had painted during the day on the street every night at Club Paradiso (Amsterdam). One focus of his work is the development of scientific models by looking at the aesthetics, and the implementation of scientific models in objects. In 1985, he calls his art direction "Objectivism". Sperling sees the form of matter as a crystal as a means of capturing time and space information for a later viewer. The scientist Rupert Sheldrake, as the founder of the morphogenetic field theory, developed the hypothesis that all matter is in morphic resonance, according to which every particle of matter has an effect on all other particles of matter, just by its mere existence, its location, or its energetic state. Sperling is based on the idea that the environmental influences during the arrangement of atoms into a crystal lattice have a shaping effect on the structure of the crystals and that the crystals can therefore later have an effect on the observer via these causalities.

Another focus of his work is the documentation of physical processes through their aesthetic. The German philosopher Thomas Metzinger, manager of the workspace Neurophilosophy at Frankfurt Institute for Advanced Studies. Science Arts writes in the videor-art-foundation's catalog. Transparency of Consciousness "Its crystal panels were probably the reason why so much attention, because they work in a particular object, the quasi-spiritual principles of order in nature itself to turn aesthetic intuition accessible."

Since 1985, he has worked with computers as a design tool. Two of his paintings are exhibited at the Center for Art and Media Karlsruhe.

1990/1991 Spokesman of the Federal Association of Artists BBK Frankfurt. 1990 Sperling served as authorized negotiators, negotiations for unification of the Federal Association of Artists with the GDR - Artists Association. He was one of the four founders of the East Side Gallery, Berlin Wall, Berlin, in March 1990.

In May 2011 he filed with other artists of the "founding Initiative East Side" complaint before the District Court of Berlin, due to destruction of art and infringement of copyright. The redevelopment of the East Side Gallery in 2009, destroyed most of a listed building images, and their conceptual artistic Character of 1990.

Sperling 1992 installed on the 1st Total German artist Congress in Potsdam, a five-meter high mobile, which, illuminated by slides, the impression of a constantly changing 3-D film produced. From 1980 the first pictures emerged from crystals and crystal panels. Sperling describes his artistic work as Objectivism. In 1991 he created at the national exhibition in Kassel, a video installation that confronted the viewer with the objective documentation of Spacetime. It was installed on a several tons of stone altar on which stood a steel basin. In this steel basin formed over time crystals from a boiling solution. The entire process has been documented over several weeks by an automatic camera. The basis of his work, he sees in line with research by Rupert Sheldrake and his theory of Morphic field.

2016 Sperling received the 4th International André Evard Audience Award of the Messmer Foundation. His Award-winning work titled: obj 1586 is the first from the work series, folded realities. In this series, the focus is on the referentiality between the entities. So the colors depending on the angle of the surfaces with respect to the scalar light source. Sperling makes reference to a philosophical approach of the philosopher Nagarjuna.

== Exhibitions ==
- 1983 Gustav-Siegle-Haus / Stuttgart
- 1986 Frankfurter Kunstverein, Das AKTFOTO (The nude photo) ideology - aesthetic - history, Museum of the 20th Century Vienna. 15 years prior to 2000 - the portrayal of violence and brutality is still a priority over the representation of sexuality and eroticism, Time-critical art action, Frankfurt
- 1990 co-founder of East Side Gallery November 1989, Berlin, image #18 "The transformation of the pentagram to a peace star in a Europe without walls" 10m x 3,60 m on Berlin Wall
- 1990The Pleasures within Distance, Window / Sydney College of the Arts, Sydney, Australia
- 1991 Hessian National Exhibition / Kassel
- 1992 Kunsthalle Darmstadt, Solo Exhibition, Art Prize of the DAG, Hamburger Kunsthalle.
- 1993 Goethe-Institut / Prag, Tschechien
- 1994 Museum Wiesbaden Hessiale 94 / Wiesbaden, national art exhibition of the Federal Association of Artists

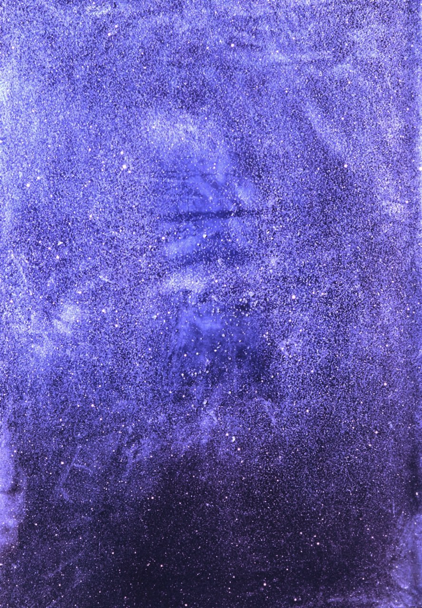
Crystal Object, Objectivism, 8°36'44" 49°43'33" 19:00h

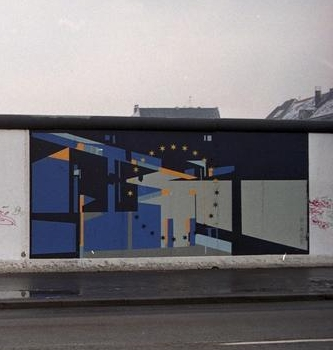
Bodo Sperlings painting on the Berliner Mauer

- 2016 Messmer Foundation, Riegel, Germany

== Collections, commissions, public art ==
- Computer Associates, implementation of the architectural design of the CA firm building in a mural for the entrance hall 1.60mx 3.60m, Acrylic on canvas and design base for the East Side Gallery image on the Berlin Wall in 1990, Germany
- East Side Galley, image #18 "The transformation of the pentagram to a peace star in a Europe without walls" 10m x 3,60 m on Berlin Wall. 1990, Berlin, Germany
- Museum of Contemporary Art ZKM Karlsruhe, "B3", 1991, Computer painting on silver photo canvas, 100 x 140 cm · "B7", 1991, Computer painting on silver photo canvas, 100 x 140 cm, Karlsruhe, Germany
- Banca Monte dei Paschi di Siena, implementation of the "Cathedral of Siena", acrylic on canvas 2.20mx 90 cm, Frankfurt / Siena - Italy
- videor art foundation, Frankfurt, Germany,"Transparency of Consciousness", 1997.
- Messmer Foundation, Riegel, Germany, Painting: 'job 1586', 55.11"x 55.11" pigments on canvas

== Awards ==
- 1992 Art Prize of the German Salaried Employees Academy
- 2016 Audience Award 4. International André Evard-Award

== Literature ==
- Oberbaum: East Side Gallery ISBN 3-928254-02-2 (catalog)
- Landeskunstausstellung ´94, National Art Exhibition, Wiesbaden, Germany, 1994 ISBN 3-9804024-0-1 (catalog)
- Thomas Metzinger: The Artistic Work of Bodo Sperling in: transparency of consciousness, Digital Art Gallery, Frankfurt, 10. 31. 1997 (catalog)
- Hessiale `94, National Art Exhibition Kassel, ISBN 3-9804024-0-1 (catalog)
- Zylvia Auerbach (ed.): The Pleasures within distance, Sydney, 1990, ISBN 0-6460-1536-2
- German Art Prize 1992, of the German Academy of Salaried Employees. Jury, Dr. Georg Syamken, Head Curator of the Kunsthalle Hamburg, Germany. Prof. Dr. Annemarie Rücktäschel, Professor of Text Theory and Communication at the Berlin University of the Arts, Germany. Hamburg 1992 (catalog)
- DuMont: 365 Orte - Eine Reise zu Deutschlands Zukunftsmachern. ISBN 978-3-7701-8216-9
- messmer foundation: 4. International André Eward - Award for concrete-constructive art. 02.13.2016 - 04.24.2016 (catalog)
