= Werner Schroeter =

German film director and screenwriter (1945–2010)

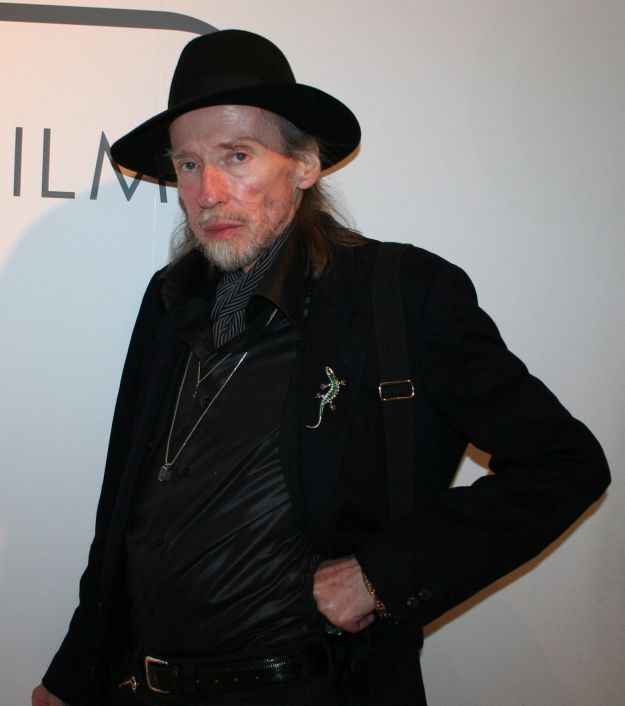
- Born: 7 April 1945; Georgenthal, Nazi Germany (present-day Germany)
- Died: 12 April 2010 (aged 65); Kassel, Germany
- Occupations: Film director Screenwriter; Opera director
- Years active: 1967–2008

Werner Schroeter (7 April 1945 – 12 April 2010) was a German film director, screenwriter, and opera director known for his stylistic excess. Schroeter was cited by Rainer Werner Fassbinder as an influence both on his own work and on German cinema at large.

== Life and career ==
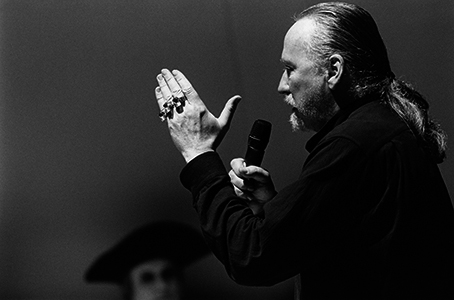
Werner Schroeter (2000)

Schroeter started out as an underground filmmaker in 1967. Garnering a small cult following, the director also made his mark on the international festival circuit. Defying categorization, his films lie somewhere between avant-garde and art cinema. Magdalena Montezuma was a German underground star that became his muse until her death in 1985. Other notable actors to star in his films include: Bulle Ogier, Carole Bouquet, and Isabelle Huppert.

After attending the Film Festival at Knokke, Belgium in 1967, Schroeter made his first 8mm film, Maria Callas Portrait, that consisted of animated stills of Callas overlaid with the sound of her singing. Eika Katappa was his first feature, which mixes pop and opera. The film was self-financed and won the Joseph von Sternberg prize for "the most idiosyncratic film" at the 1969 Mannheim Film Festival.

His "total cinema" films were predominantly produced by Das kleine Fernsehspiel ("The Little Television Play"), a small experimental department of the German public-service station. The company supported some of Schroeter's most controversial projects including: The Bomber Pilot (70), Salome (71), Macbeth (71), and Goldflocken (76). The Reign of Naples marked the director's shift toward more plot-driven films, commenting: "it is much more radical to play with the content than with the aesthetics of the image. The era of independence is over. Our society has not fulfilled the promises hoped for around '68-'70". The film won many prizes domestically and internationally and was his first commercial release.

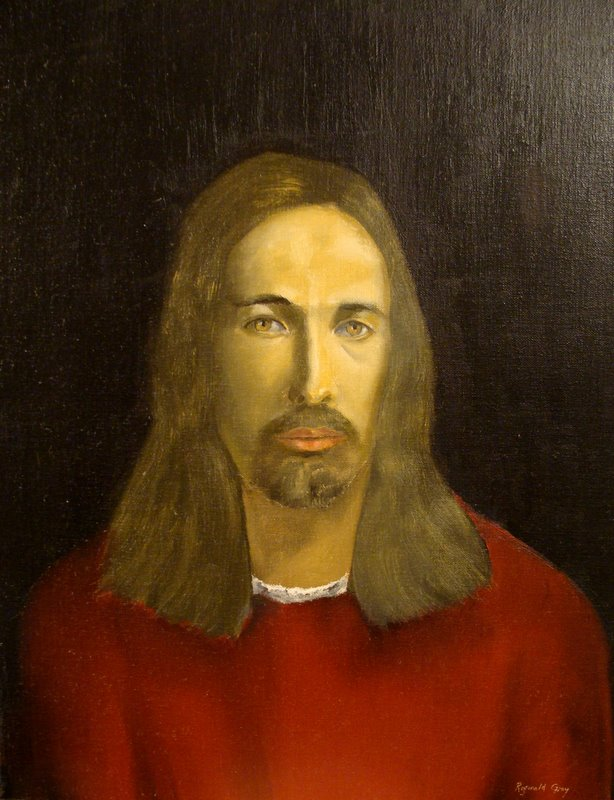
Portrait by Reginald Gray Paris. 1974.

Schroeter had also worked in film as a producer, cinematographer, editor and actor. As an actor, he appeared in several films directed by his friend Rainer Werner Fassbinder, including Beware of a Holy Whore (1971), and a number of theatre productions. During the second half of the 1980s, Schroeter became widely known as a theater and opera director both in Germany and abroad, returning to filmmaking in 1990 with Malina, a literary adaptation starring Isabelle Huppert based on Ingeborg Bachmann's novel. The film won the German Film Award in Gold. Deux also stars (and was written for) Huppert and premiered at Cannes in 2002, but did not get German distribution.

His 1980 film Palermo oder Wolfsburg, telling the story of a Sicilian guest worker in Germany, won the Golden Bear at the 30th Berlin International Film Festival, while his 1991 production Malina was entered into that year's Cannes Film Festival.

Although he is mainly known for elaborate and excessive camp fables, the director also made some hard-hitting documentaries including Smiling Star (83) and For Example, Argentina (83–85) about the Marcos regime in the Philippines and the Leopoldo Galtieri military dictatorship in Argentina, respectively.

At the time of his death Schroeter had been organizing a photography exhibition with his art-dealer friend Christian Holzfuss featuring his own works, most of which were manipulated portraits of the many actresses with whom he had worked over the years. In 2011 a documentary about the director was made by Elfi Mikesch, a close friend and collaborator, entitled Mondo Lux: The Visual Worlds of Werner Schroeter

In 2016 he was awarded posthumously with the Traetta Prize for his work in the rediscovery of the roots of European music.

== Personal life ==
During the 1960s, Schroeter worked with German experimental film-maker and gay rights activist, Rosa von Praunheim. Schroeter also worked as a theater and opera director, in Germany and abroad. In the late 1970s, Schroeter met Irish artist Reginald Gray at a collection of Yves Saint Laurent in Paris. Gray painted a portrait of Schroeter.

== Filmography ==
- La morte d'Isotta (1968)
- Grotesk - Burlesk - Pittoresk (1968)
- Nicaragua (1969)
- Eika Katappa (1969)
- Anglia (1970, TV film)
- Der Bomberpilot (1970, TV film)
- Salome (1971, TV film)
- Macbeth (1971, TV film)
- The Death of Maria Malibran (1972)
- Willow Springs (1973)
- Der schwarze Engel (1975)
- Goldflocken (1976)
- The Kingdom of Naples / The Neapolitan Siblings (1978)
- Weiße Reise (1980)
- Palermo or Wolfsburg (1980)
- Day of the Idiots (1981)
- Liebeskonzil (1982)
- The Rose King (1986)
- Malina (1991)
- Deux (2002)
- This Night (2008)

== Shorts ==
- 1967 Verona
- Virginia's Death (1968)
- 1968 Übungen mit Darstellern
- 1968 Paula – Je reviens
- 1968 Mona Lisa
- 1968 Maria Callas Porträt
- 1968 Himmel hoch
- 1968/II Faces
- 1968 Callas Walking Lucia
- 1968 Callas-Text mit Doppelbeleuchtung
- 1968 Aggressionen
- Neurasia (1969)
- Argila (1969)
- 1975 Johannas Traum

== Documentaries ==
- Die Generalprobe (1980)
- Der lachende Stern (1983)
- De l'Argentine (1986)
- Auf der Suche nach der Sonne (1986)
- Poussières d'amour – Abfallprodukte der Liebe (1996)
- The Queen (2000)

== Literature ==
- Roy Grundmann (ed.): Werner Schroeter. FilmmuseumSynemaPublikationen, Vienna 2018, ISBN 978-3-901644-74-0. Essays by Christine N. Brinckmann, Ed Dimendberg, Caryl Flinn, Gerd Gemünden, Roy Grundmann, Gertrud Koch, Michelle Langford, Fatima Naqvi and Marc Siegel
- Heinz-Norbert Jocks: Ästhetik des Widerstands. Von der Schönheit der Hoffnung und der Schönheit der Verzweiflung. Ein Gespräch. In: Lettre International, No. 89, 2010, p. 94–100.
