= Street Acquaintances (1948 film) =

1948 film

- Directed by: Peter Pewas
- Written by: Arthur Pohl
- Starring: Gisela Trowe; Alice Treff
- Cinematography: Georg Bruckbauer
- Edited by: Johanna Meisel
- Music by: Michael Jary
- Production company: DEFA
- Distributed by: Progress Film
- Release date: 13 April 1948
- Running time: 104 minutes
- Country: Germany
- Language: German

Street Acquaintances (German: Straßenbekanntschaft) is a 1948 German drama film directed by Peter Pewas and starring Gisela Trowe, Alice Treff and Ursula Voß. It was made by the Communist-controlled DEFA studios in the Soviet Zone of Germany Released in both the future West and East Germany it was a popular hit and sold 6,469,626 tickets. While it can be regarded as using a style that resembled the Italian neorealist films of the era, it has also been suggested that it returns to the more traditional style of the Weimar era. It portrays the dangers of spreading venereal disease.

It was shot at the Babelsberg Studios in Berlin and on location around the city. The film's sets were designed by the art director Wilhelm Depenau.

== Cast ==
- Gisela Trowe as Erika
- Alice Treff as Annemie
- Ursula Voß as Marion
- Siegmar Schneider as Walter Helbig
- Harry Hindemith as Herbert Petzoldt
- Hans Klering as Peter
- Ursula Friese as Else
- Arno Paulsen as Elses Freund
- Gertrud Boll as Olly Gebauer
- Eduard Wandrey as Spitz
- Ursula Krieg as Frau Möbius
- Herwart Grosse as Arzt im Gesundheitsamt
- Agnes Windeck as Krankenschwester
- Marlise Ludwig as Erikas Mutter
- Eduard Wenck as Nachbar im Treppenhaus
- Lotte Loebinger
- Arthur Wiesner as Erikas Vater
- Walter Werner as Redakteur
- Karl Hannemann as Schieber
- Monika Bode as Ärztin im Chefarztzimmer
- Peter Elsholtz as Marions Freund
- Ernst Rotmund as Unangenehmer Zeitgenosse
- Karin Evans as Ärztin im Gesundheitsamt
- Ursula Kolmetz
- Otto Matthies as Nervöser Herr
- Werner Pledath as Praktischer Arzt
- Otto Brahn
- Axel Triebel as Ein alter Major
- Ellen Ysenta
- Werner Segtrop

== Bibliography ==
- Martina Moeller. Rubble, Ruins and Romanticism: Visual Style, Narration and Identity in German Post-War Cinema. 2014.
