= Seat of the European Central Bank =

Headquarters of the ECB in Frankfurt, Germany

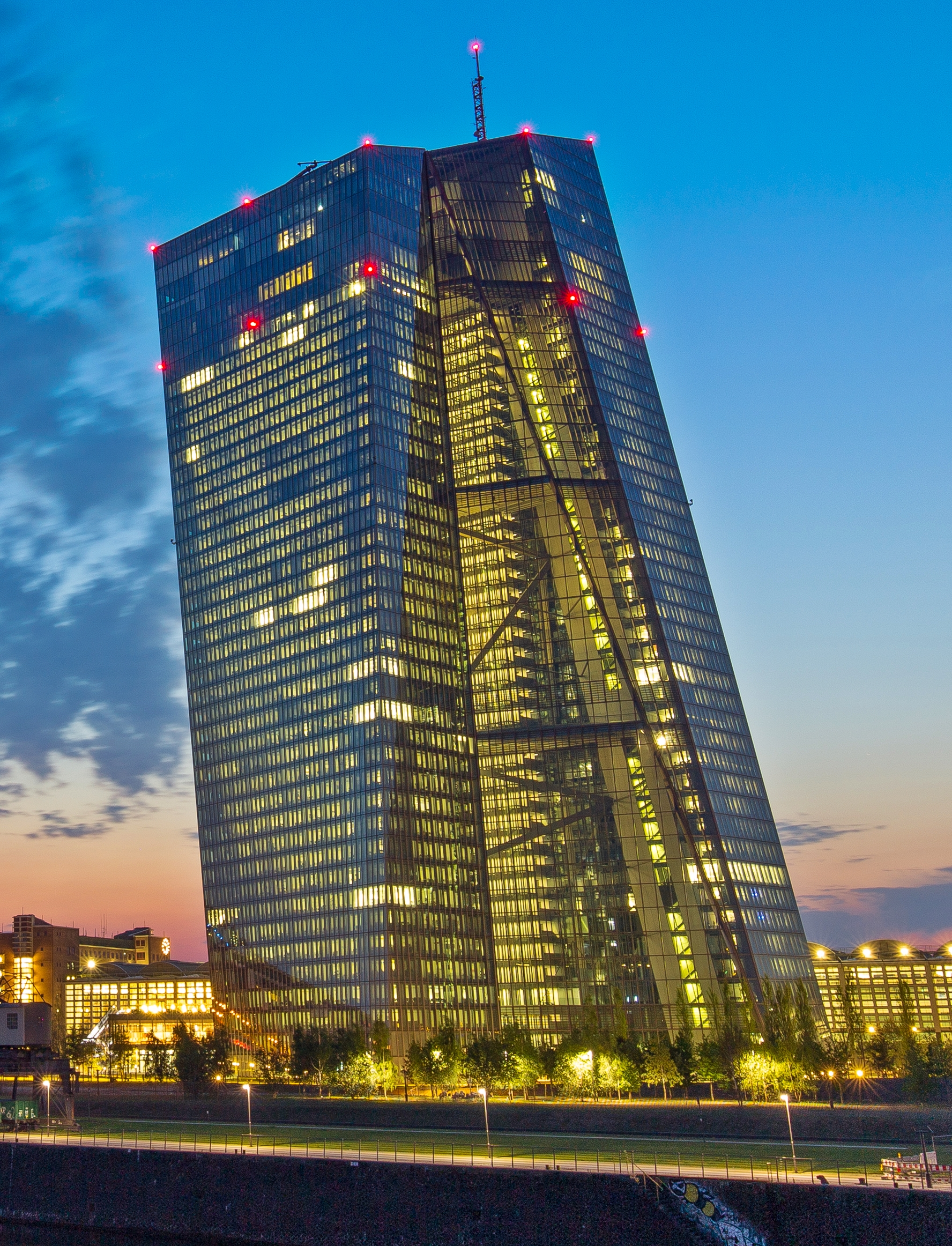
- Building in 2015
- Interactive map of the Seat of the European Central Bank area
- Alternative names: New ECB Premises, Neubau der Europäischen Zentralbank

General information
- Status: Completed
- Type: Government offices
- Architectural style: Deconstructivism
- Location: Frankfurt, Hesse, Germany
- Coordinates: 50°06′34″N 8°42′09″E
- Construction started: Spring 2010
- Completed: October 2014
- Inaugurated: 18 March 2015
- Cost: ~ €1.4 billion
- Owner: European Central Bank

Height
- Antenna spire: 201 m (659 ft)
- Roof: 185 m (607 ft)

Technical details
- Floor count: 48
- Floor area: 184,000 m^{2} (1,980,000 sq ft)
- Lifts/elevators: 18

Design and construction
- Architect: Coop Himmelb(l)au
- Engineer: Bollinger + Grohmann; Ove Arup & Partners; Ebert-Ingenieure Nürnberg

Other information
- Public transit: Ostendstraße (6 min)

The seat of the European Central Bank is situated in Frankfurt, Germany. Its premises comprise a twin-tower skyscraper and the city's former Wholesale Market Hall (Großmarkthalle), with a low-rise building connecting the two. It was completed in 2014 and was officially opened on 18 March 2015.

The European Central Bank (ECB) is required by the Treaties of the European Union to have its seat within the city limits of Frankfurt, the largest financial centre in the eurozone. The ECB previously resided in the Eurotower and, as its duties increased due to countries joining the eurozone, in three further high-rise buildings nearby – the Eurotheum and Japan Center.

== Architecture ==
The main office building, constructed for the ECB, consists of two towers that are joined by an atrium with four interchange platforms. The North tower has 45 storeys and a roof height of 185 m (607 ft), whereas the South tower has 43 storeys and a roof height of 165 m (541 ft). With the antenna, the North tower reaches a height of 201 m (659 ft). The ECB premises also includes the Grossmarkthalle, a former wholesale market hall built from 1926 to 1928 as part of the New Frankfurt project and the world's widest monocoque construction at the time, fully renovated for its new purpose.

== History ==
=== Development ===
In 1999, an international architectural competition was launched by the bank to design a new building. It was won by a Vienna-based architectural office called Coop Himmelb(l)au. The building was to be 185 meters tall (201 meters with antenna), accompanied by other secondary buildings on a landscaped site on the site of the former wholesale market (Großmarkthalle) in the eastern part of Frankfurt. The main construction work was planned to commence in October 2008, with completion scheduled for before the end of 2011.

Construction was put on hold in June 2008 as the ECB was unable to find a contractor that would build the Skytower for the allocated budget of €500 million due to the bidding taking place at the peak of the pre-late-2000s recession bubble. A year later with prices having fallen significantly the ECB launched a new tendering process broken up into segments.

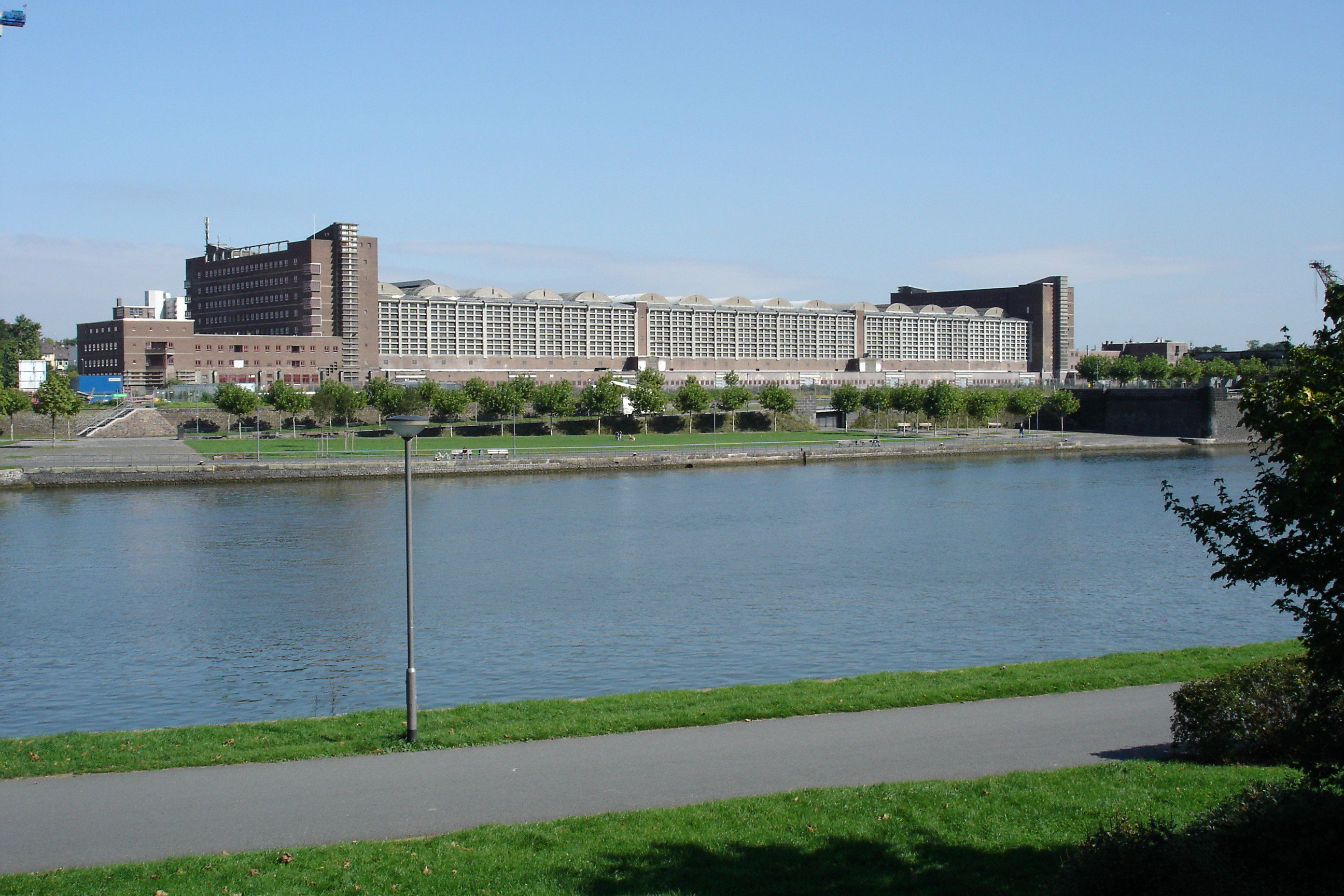
Großmarkthalle site (2006)

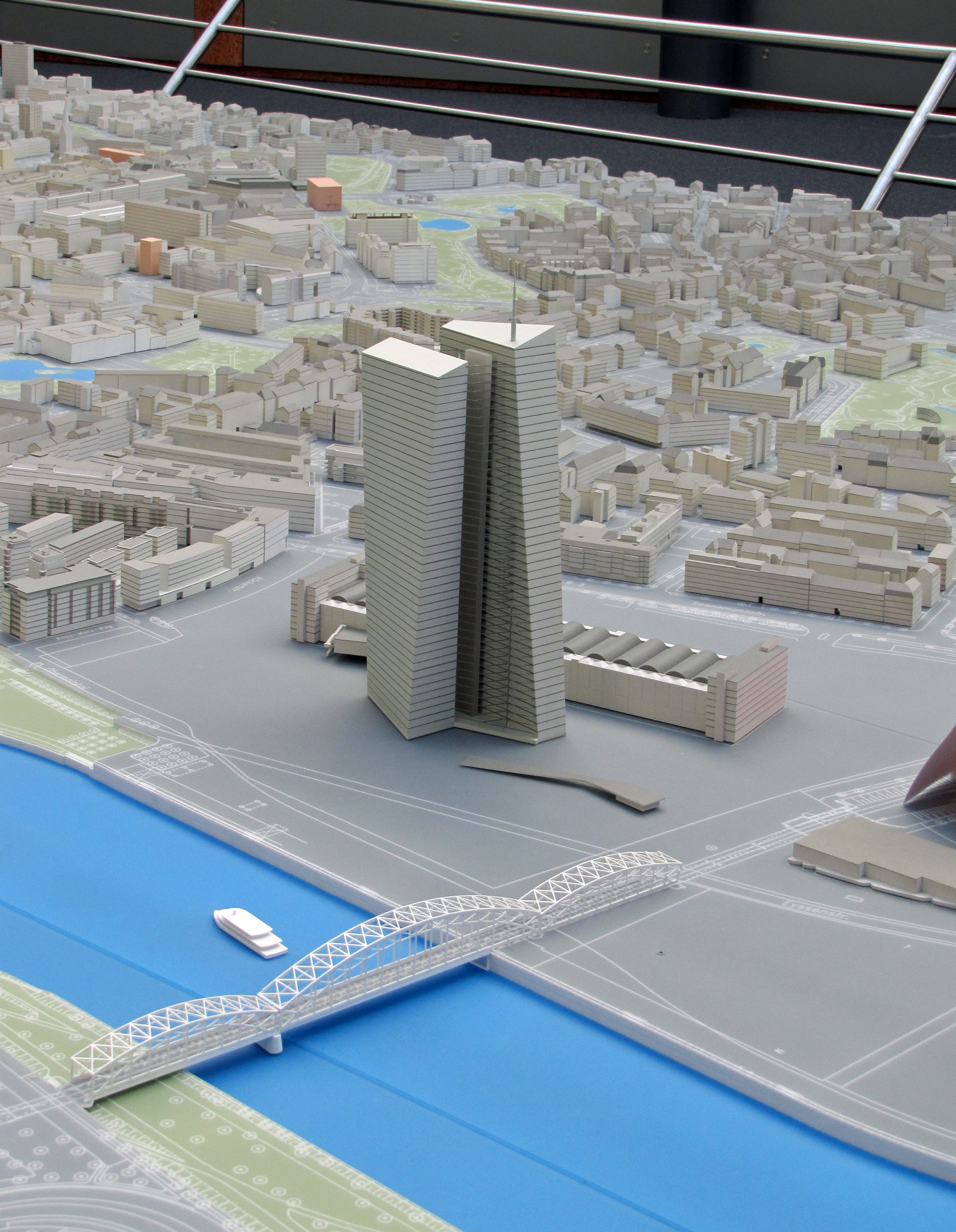
Model seen in 2011

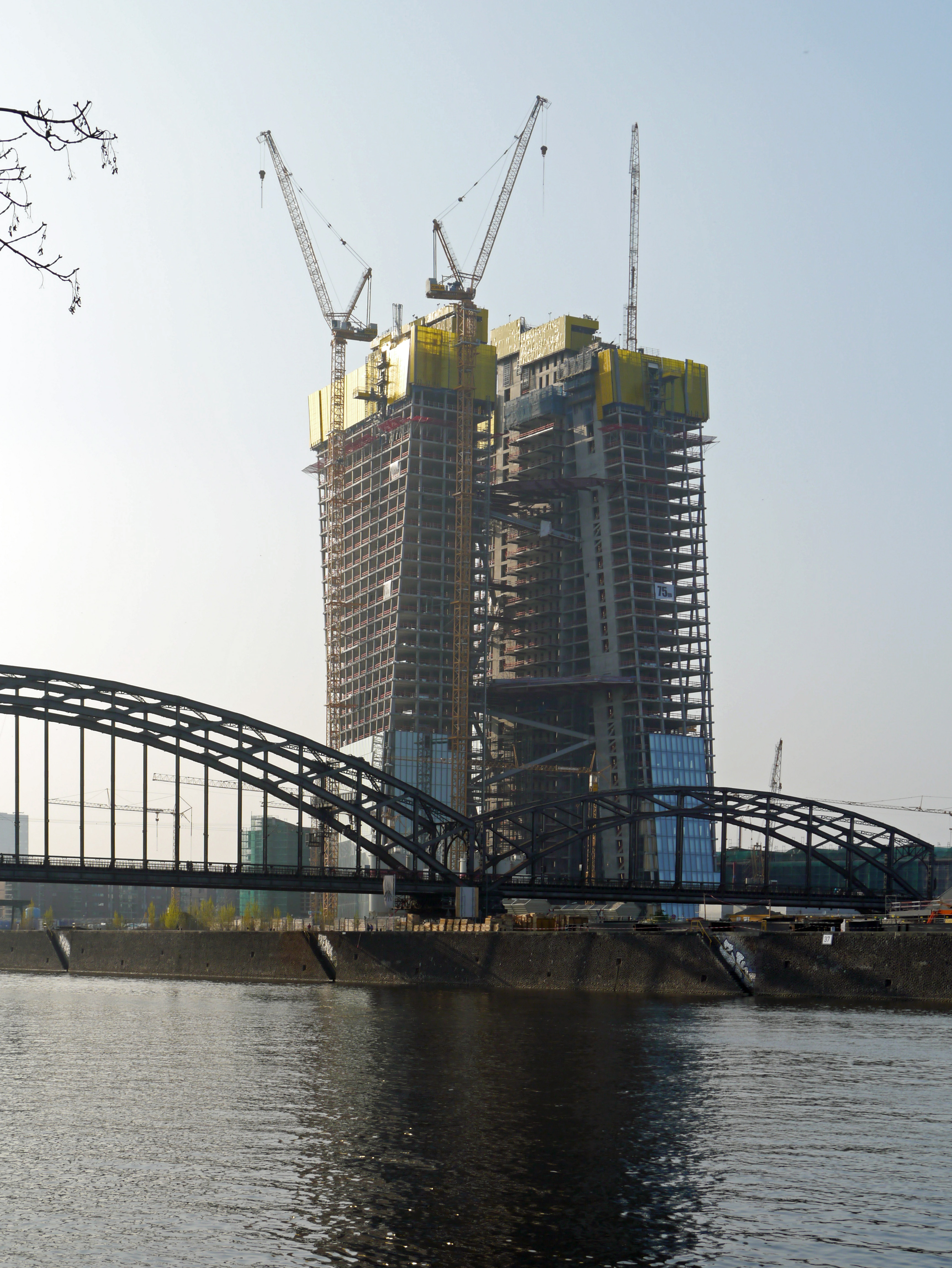
Construction in 2012

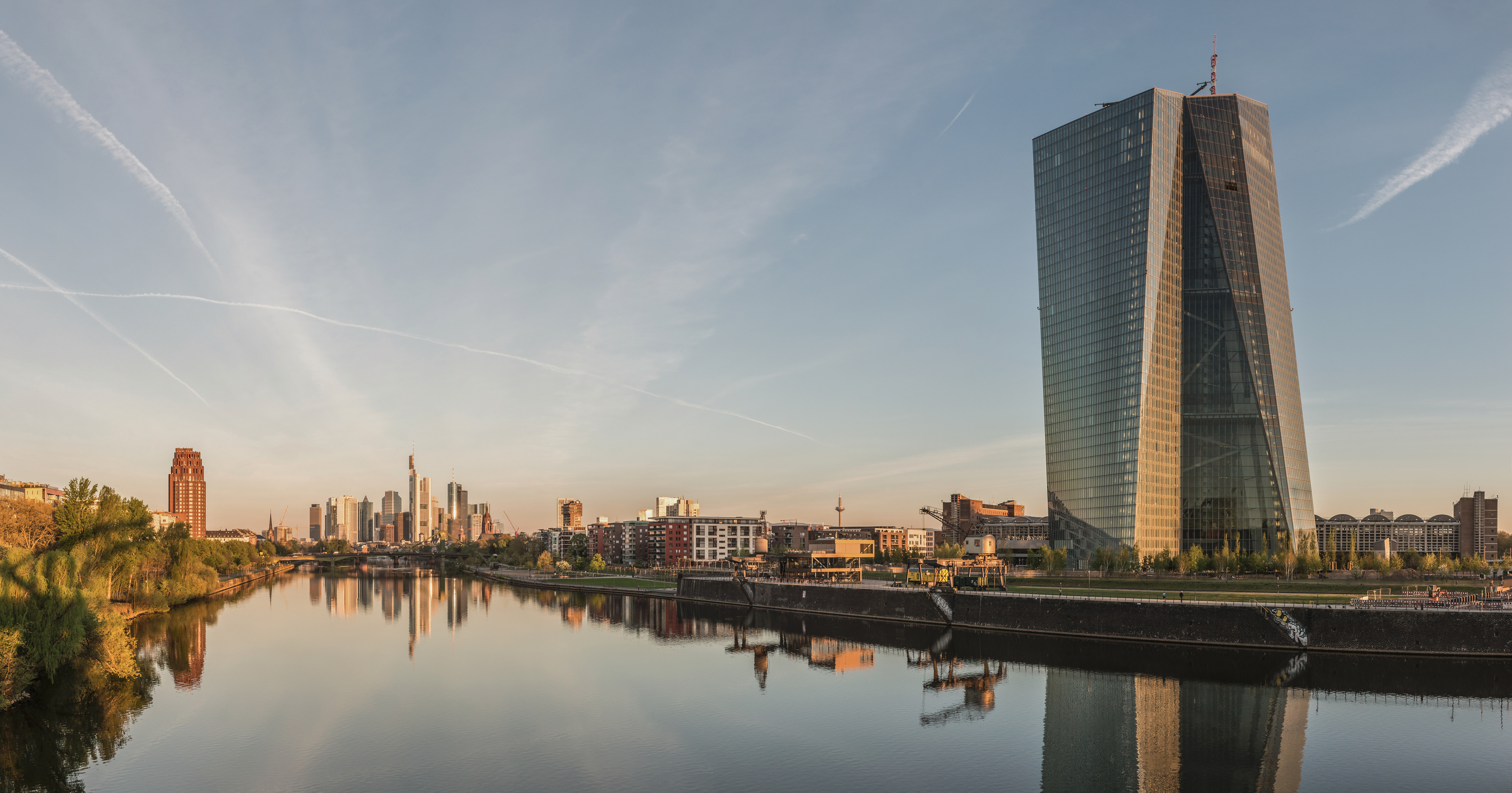
Building at dawn (2015)

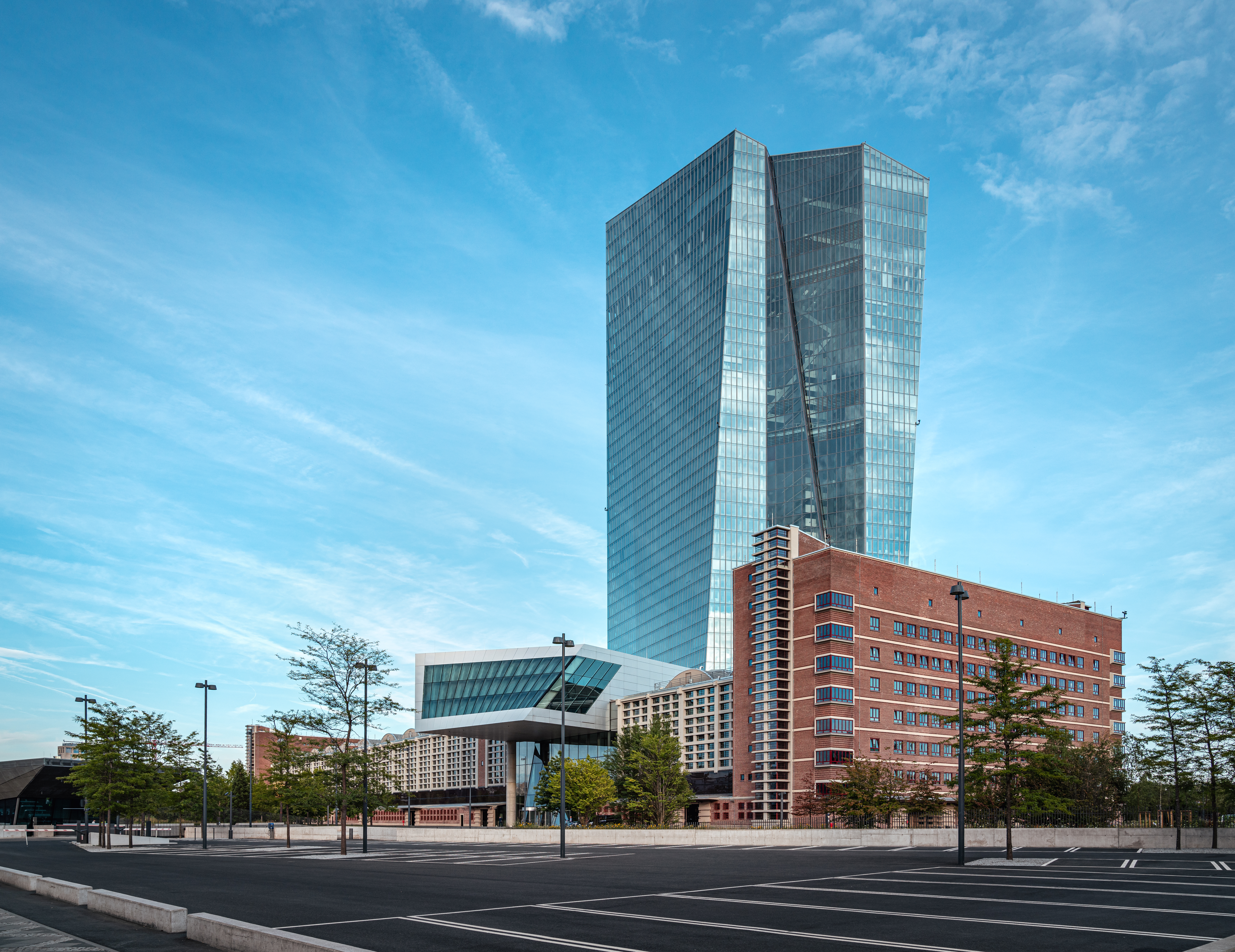
Seat of the ECB seen from northwest (2019)

seen in 2026

It is expected that the building will become an architectural symbol for Europe and is designed to cope with double the number of staff who operate in the Eurotower. The total cost of the project was between 1.3 and 1.4 billion euros. For the total surface of 185,000 square meters, this gives a building cost in excess of 7,000 euros per square meter.

=== Opening ===
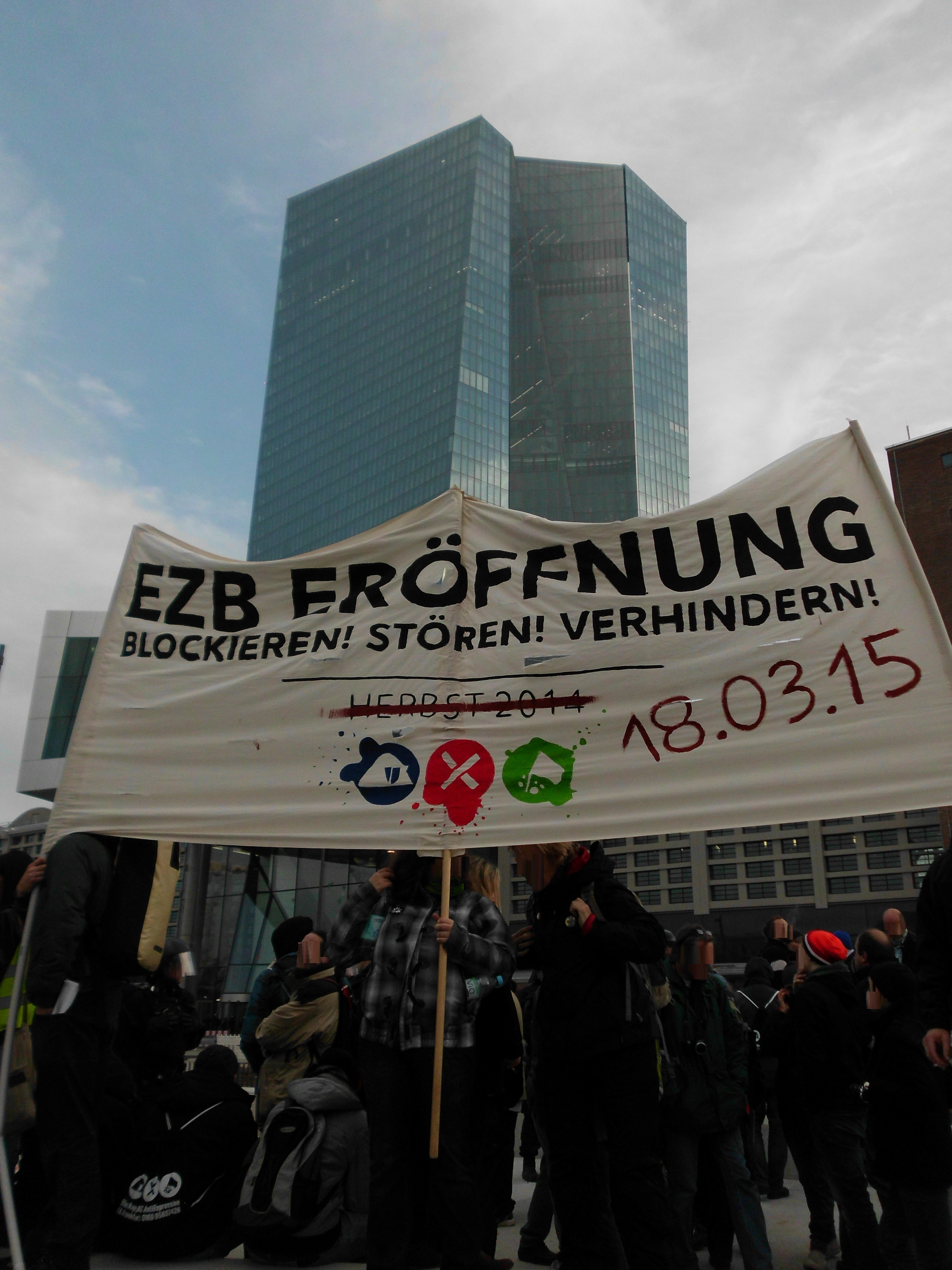
Demonstration of the Blockupy movement in front of the ECB (2014)

Staff began moving into the new building in November 2014, and the building was officially opened on 18 March 2015. The opening was marked by a three-day protest organised by the Blockupy movement. Ulrich Wilken, an organizer and member of the Hesse state assembly for the Die Linke party, said: "Our protest is against the ECB, as a member of the troika, that, despite the fact that it is not democratically elected, hinders the work of the Greek government. We want the austerity politics to end." Police used water cannons and tear gas against protestors, while demonstrators threw stones at police, firefighters and Frankfurt's trams, and set fire to cars and barricades.

== Legal basis ==
The seat of the European Central Bank enjoys special legal protections granted by an agreement with the German government. It is illegal to enter the ECB's premises to enforce a court order or execute a search warrant. It is also illegal to confiscate materials on the ECB's premises. The German government has a duty to protect the Central Bank against intruders, including foreign agents and protestors.

== See also ==
- European Central Bank
- Eurotower
- Institutional seats of the European Union
- List of tallest buildings in Frankfurt
- List of tallest buildings in Germany
