= Großmarkthalle =

Building in Frankfurt, Germany

Coordinates: 50°06′34″N 08°42′9″E

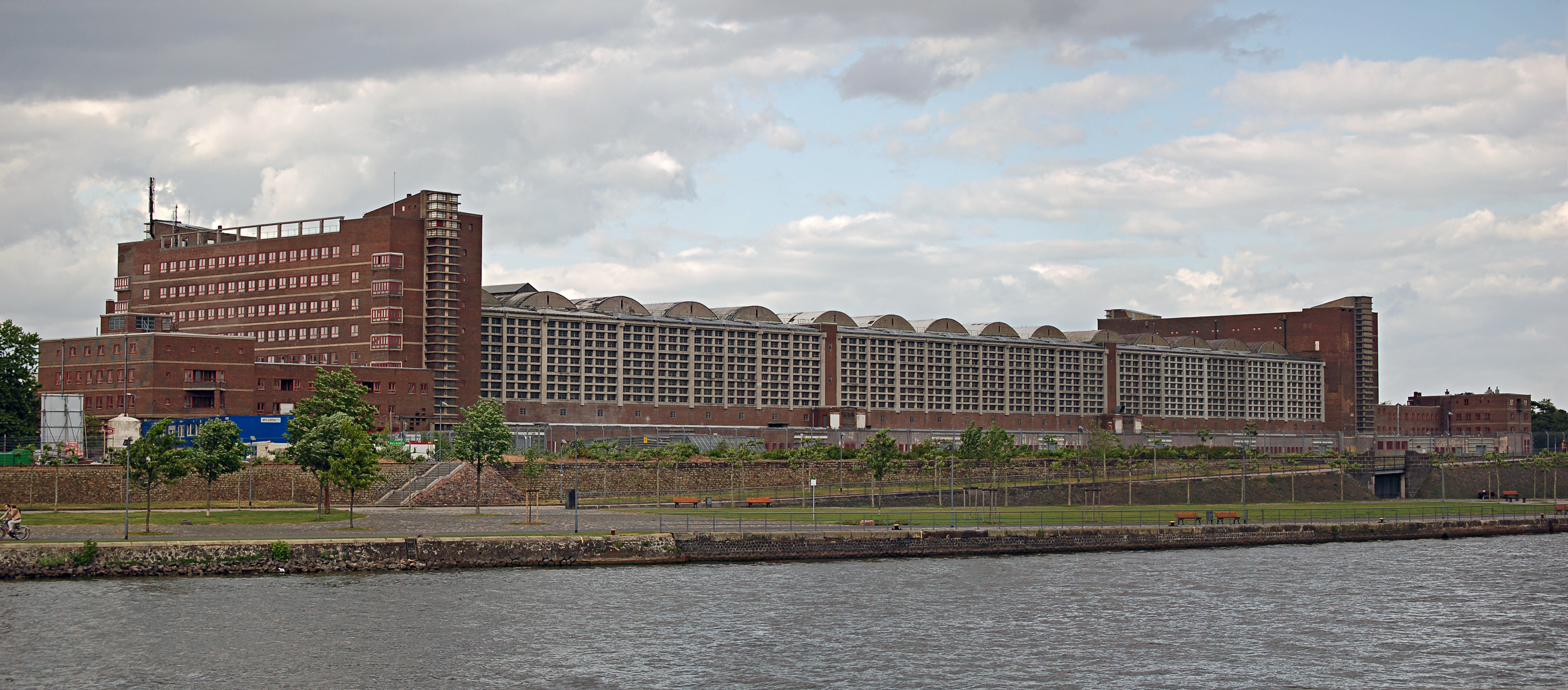
The Großmarkthalle, view from the Deutschherrnufer

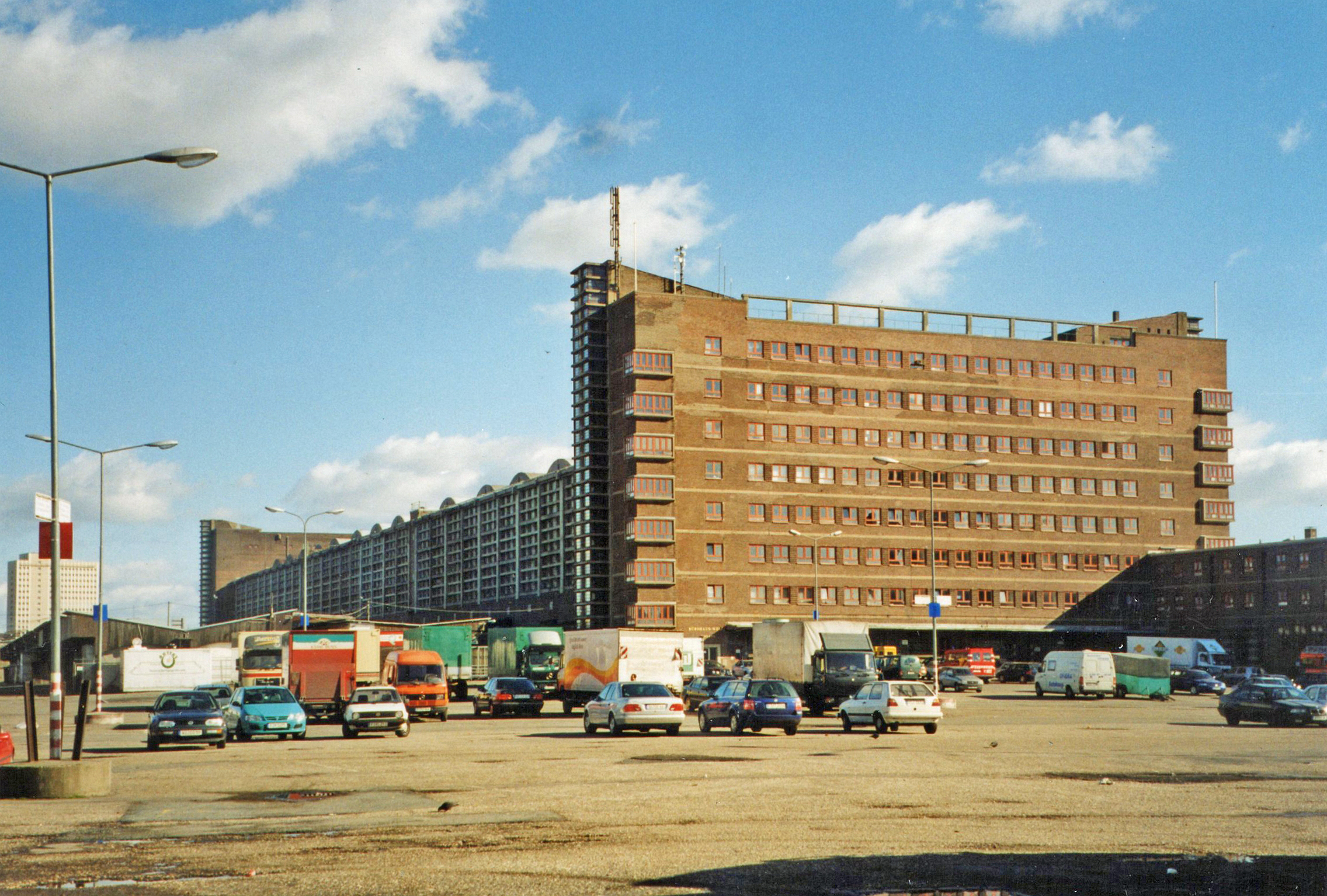
The Großmarkthalle, during use 2002

The Großmarkthalle (Wholesale Market Hall), in Ostend (East End), Frankfurt am Main, was the city's main wholesale market, especially for fruit and vegetables. It closed on 4 June 2004 and the building now forms part of the Seat of the European Central Bank. It is considered a major example of expressionist architecture.

== History ==
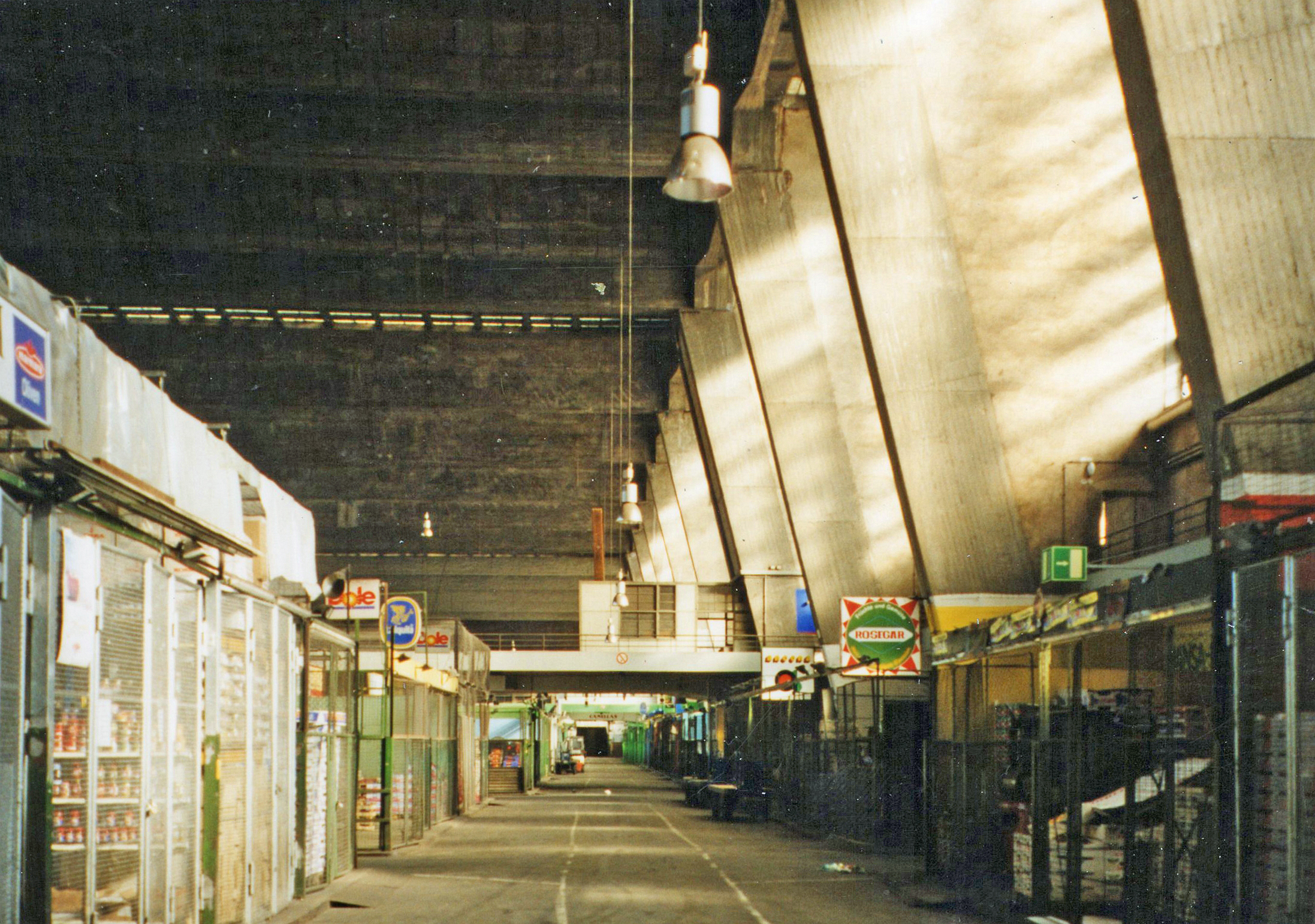
Inside, 2002

The massive structure on the right bank of the Main, immediately adjacent to Frankfurt's east port (Osthafen), was designed by Martin Elsaesser as part of the New Frankfurt-project. It was inaugurated on 25 October 1928. With a length of 220 m, a width of 50 m and a height of 17 to 23 m (722 by 164 by 55 to 75 ft), it was the city's largest architectural unit at the time. It provided 13,000 square metres (140,000 ft^{2}) of space for a total of 130 stalls, most of which served large-scale customers, such as hospitality businesses or retailers. The building, and its surroundings, also hosted offices and storage space for wholesalers, shipping companies and agencies.

From October 1941 onwards, the Nazis used the Großmarkthalle as a collecting point for the deportation of Jewish men, women and children from Frankfurt and its region. Since 1997, this locally important role within the holocaust is recognised by a commemorative plaque.

The Großmarkthalle, locally known as "Gemieskersch" (Frankfurt Hessian for "Gemüsekirche", literally "vegetable church"), has been a listed building since 1984. In 2004, its function was transferred to the "Frischezentrum Frankfurt" in the suburban district of Kalbach-Riedberg, with a total of 128,000 square metres (1,380,000 ft^{2}) of space, including 23,000 square metres (250,000 ft^{2}) for retail purposes.

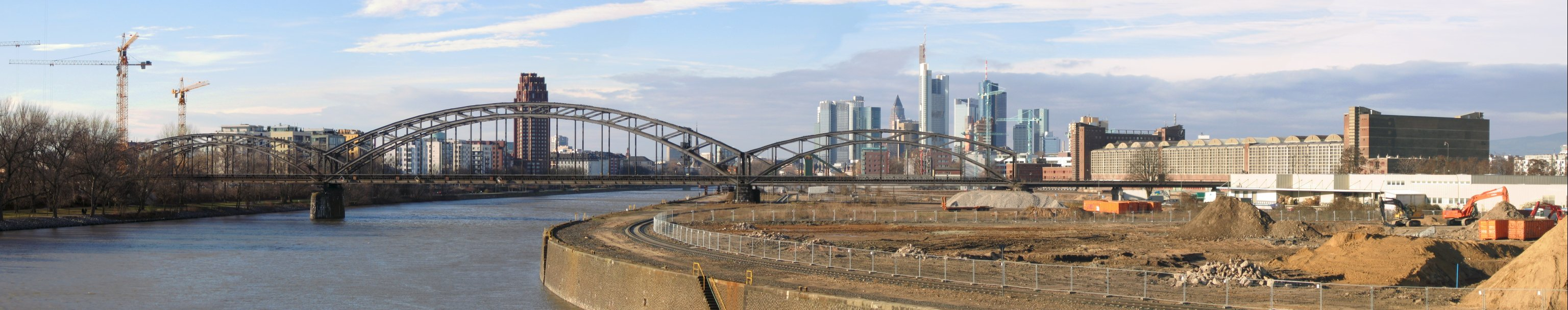
Großmarkthalle (right) and Deutschherrnbrücke (left)

== New use by the European Central Bank ==
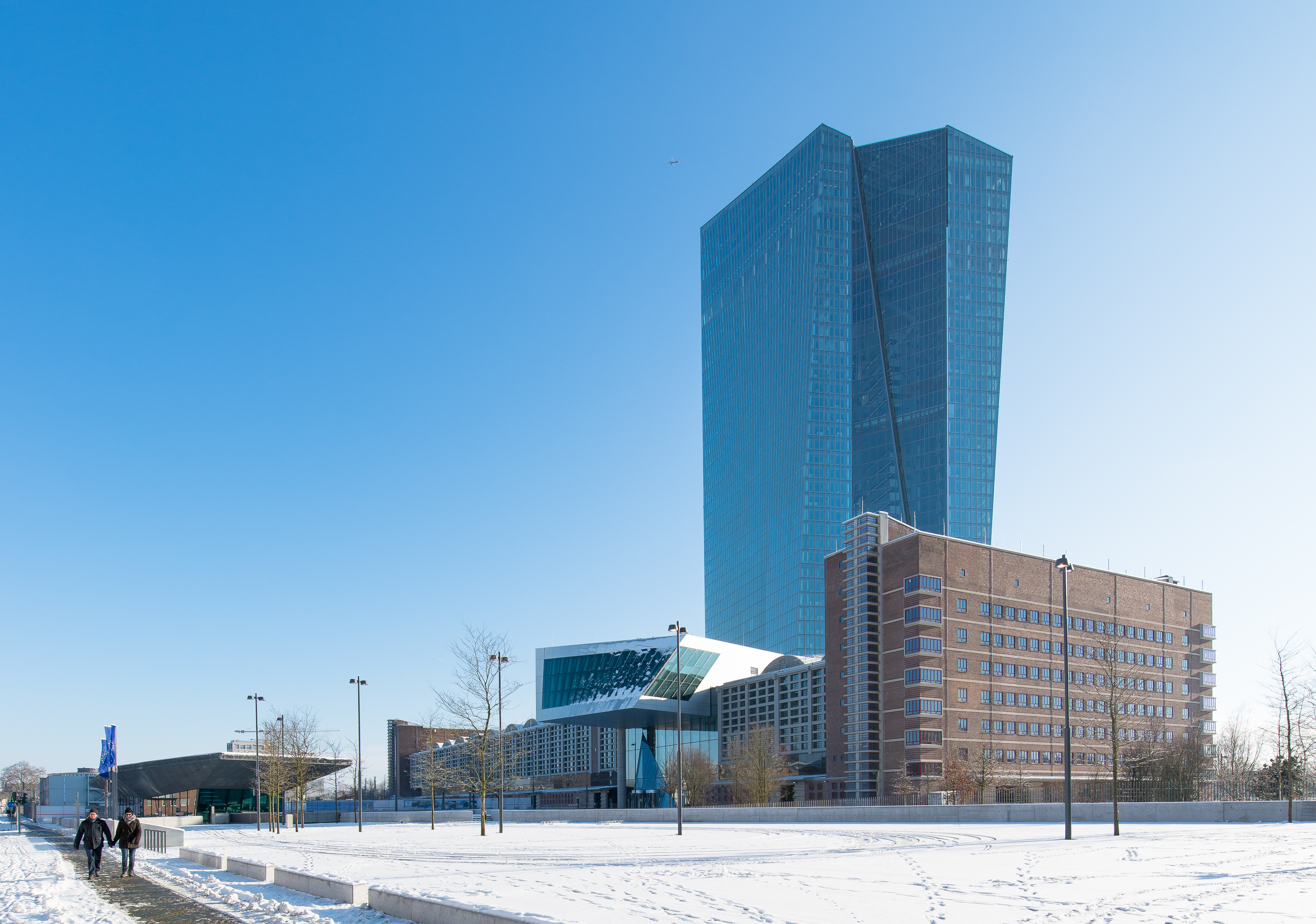
The Großmarkthalle as part of the ECB building

On 1 January 2005, the City of Frankfurt transferred the Großmarkthalle and its area to the European Central Bank (the sale contract had been signed in 2002), which will erect its seat there.

The main part of the hall was preserved and mainly houses the public functions of the ECB, such as a visitors' area, the staff restaurant, as well as press and conference spaces. The space between the hall and the Main river is taken up by the Skytower, a complex of two intertwined 180 m (590 ft) skyscrapers, designed by the Vienna-based Coop Himmelb(l)au. A memorial for the deported Jews was also created, in close cooperation with the Jewish Museum Frankfurt.

In November 2006, the planning committee of Frankfurt accepted a proposal to de-list the so-called annexbauten, two transversal buildings added to the narrow ends of the hall, originally serving clerical and social functions. The local heritage authorities permitted the demolition of these structures. Furthermore, the western third of the hall's roof, destroyed in World War II and restored thereafter was cut by a diagonal structure placed partially inside and partially outside the hall so as to "let the building's new function spread beyond its confines".

According to the heirs of the building's architect, Martin Elsaesser (died in 1957), the external appearance of the Großmarkthalle may not be changed according to moral rights, so that the planned alterations would require their agreement until such rights expire 70 years after the death of Elsaesser. This view may be inaccurate, since it is now known that there is 1932 contract between Elsaesser and the city of Frankfurt that permits alterations to the structure of the hall.

== Description of the hall ==
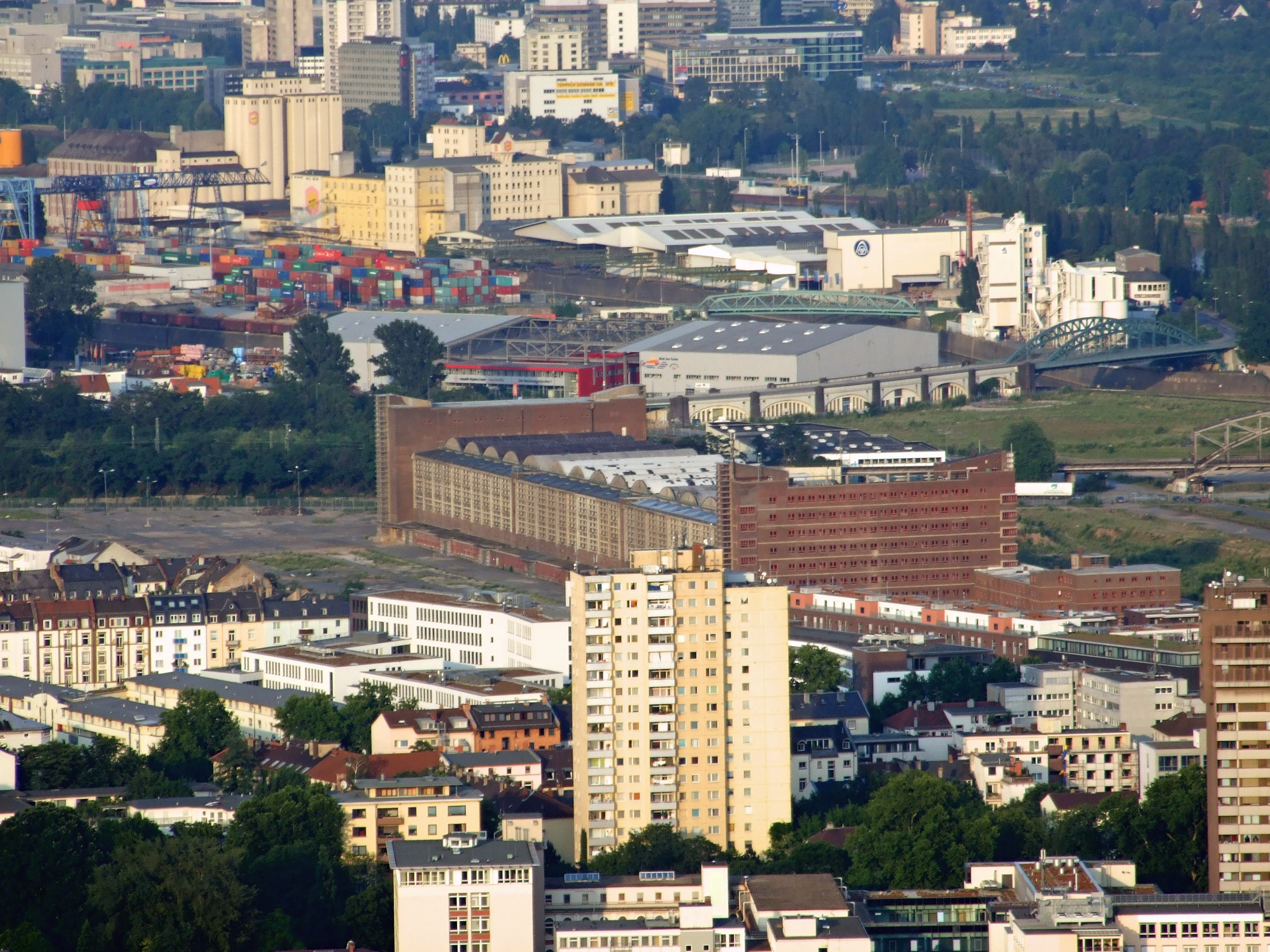
View from Main Tower of the west side of the Großmarkthalle

The Großmarkthalle Frankfurt am Main is a massively built hall with a roof freely spanning 50 m (164 ft). At the time of its construction it was the world's widest monocoque construction. The entirety of the area is roofed by 15 barrel vaults with a support span of 36.9 m (121 ft) and a vault span of 14.1 m (46 ft). The concrete "barrels" (Zeiss-Dywidag barrels) are made of concrete and are only 7 cm (2^{3}/_{4} in) thick. Their basic form is a half ellipse of 6 m (20 ft) height. It was realised between 1926 and 1928 by Franz Dischinger and Ulrich Finsterwalder. The hall itself was built in only 24 weeks by the companies Dyckerhoff & Widmann (Dywidag) and Wayss & Freytag AG.

The total cost of constructions was ℛℳ 15,372,000.

== See also ==
- Brick Expressionism

== Bibliography ==
- Günter Günschel: Große Konstrukteure 1 Freyssinet, Maillart, Dischinger, Finsterwalder. Verlag Ullstein GmbH Berlin 1966
- Walter Bachmann: Frankfurter Großmarkthalle. JW-Verlag, Frankfurt 2001, ISBN 3-934354-02-5
- Wolf-Christian Setzepfandt: Architekturführer Frankfurt am Main. 3rd ed. Dietrich Reimer Verlag, Berlin August 2002, ISBN 3-496-01236-6, p. 44.
