= Blum Affair =

1948 film directed by Erich Engel

- Directed by: Erich Engel
- Written by: Robert A. Stemmle
- Produced by: Herbert Uhlich
- Starring: Hans Christian Blech; Ernst Waldow; Karin Evans
- Cinematography: Friedl Behn-Grund; Karl Plintzner
- Edited by: Lilian Seng
- Music by: Herbert Trantow
- Production company: DEFA
- Release date: 3 December 1948
- Running time: 109 minutes
- Country: East Germany
- Language: German

Blum Affair (German: Affaire Blum) is a 1948 East German drama film directed by Erich Engel and starring Hans Christian Blech, Ernst Waldow and Karin Evans. It is based on a real 1926 case in Magdeburg in which a German Jewish industrialist is tried for murder. The film was produced in the future East Germany and produced by DEFA. It was shot at the Babelsberg Studios and Althoff Studios in the Soviet zone. The film's sets were designed by the art director Emil Hasler.

== Cast ==
- Hans Christian Blech as Karlheinz Gabler
- Ernst Waldow as Kriminalkommissar Schwerdtfeger
- Paul Bildt as Untersuchungsrichter Konrat
- Karin Evans as Sabine Blum
- Helmuth Rudolph as Wilschinsky - Regierungspräsident
- Alfred Schieske as Kriminalkommissar Otto Bonte
- Gisela Trowe as Christina Burman
- Kurt Ehrhardt as Dr. Jakob Blum
- Gerhard Bienert as Karl Bremer
- Herbert Hübner as Landgerichtsdirektor Hecht
- Friedrich Maurer as Lawyer Dr. Gerhard Wormser
- Klaus Becker as Hans Fischer - Gutsvolontär
- Arno Paulsen as Wilhelm Platzer
- Hilde Adolphi as Alma - das 'süße' Mädchen
- Maly Delschaft as Anna Platzer
- Hugo Kalthoff as Kriminalassistent Lorenz
- Blandine Ebinger as Lucie Schmerschneider
- Reinhard Kolldehoff as Max Tischbein - Lehrer
- Emmy Burg as Therese
- Renée Stobrawa as Frieda Bremer
- Jean Brahn as Fritz Merkel
- Albert Venohr as Waffenhändler
- Gertrud Boll as Dienstmädchen bei Dr. Blum
- Otto Matthies as Reporter
- Herbert Malsbender as Redakteur
- Werner Peters as Egon Konrad
- Margarete Schön as Sophie Konrad
- Eva Bodden as Sekretärin bei Wilschninsky
- Arthur Schröder as Landtagsabgeordneter von Hinkeldey
- Richard Drosten as Zahnarzt
- Lili Schoenborn-Anspach as Patientin
- Margarete Salbach as Ruth Tischbein

== Reception ==
Bosley Crowther, critic for The New York Times, praised it as "a trenchant dramatic exposition of the way in which an innocent German Jew is almost destroyed by nascent Nazis—back in 1926."

The film sold more than 4,330,000 tickets, making it one of DEFA's all-time most successful productions.
