= Martin Elsaesser =

German architect (1884–1957)

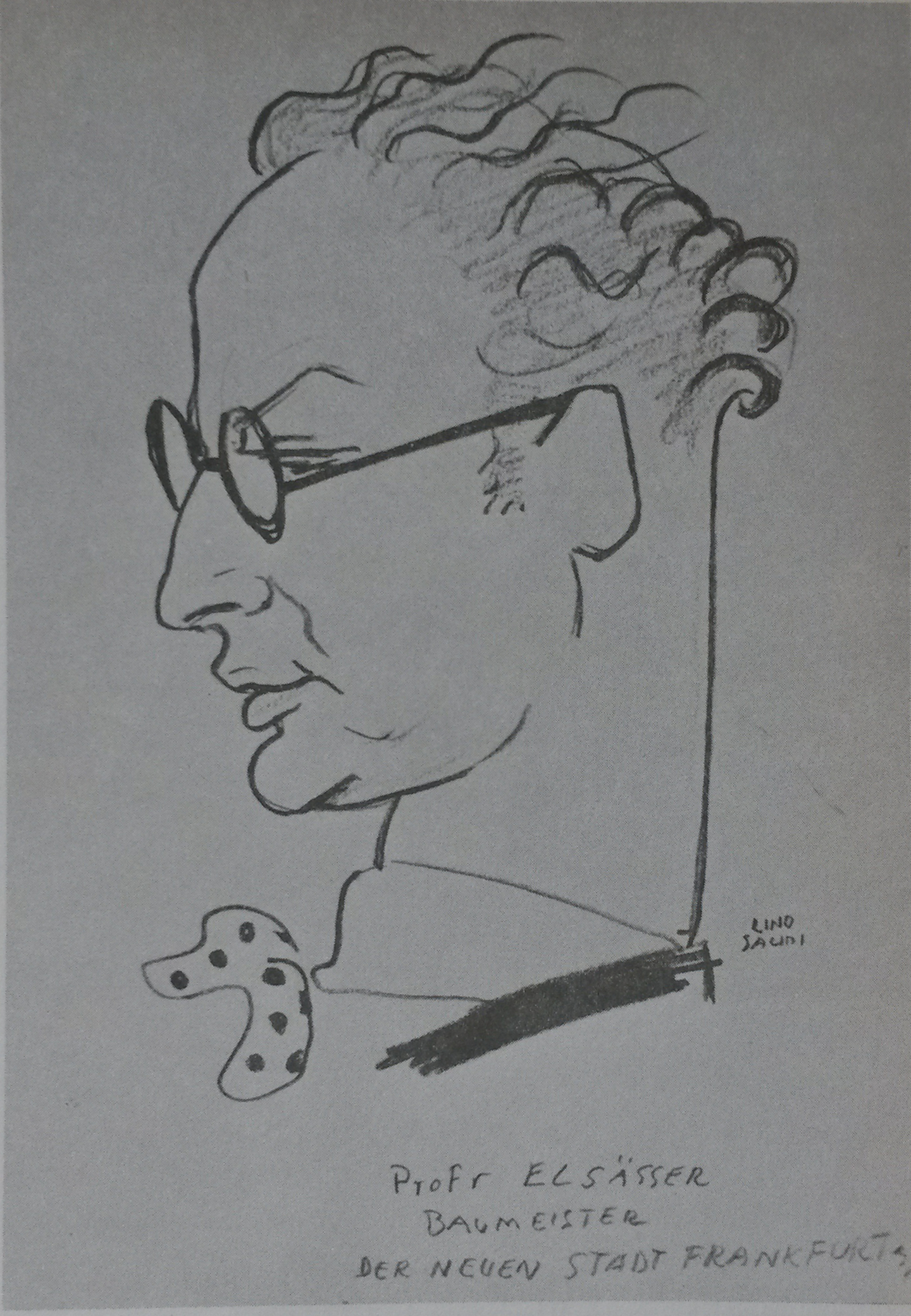
- drawing by Lino Salini, before 1925
- Born: 28 May 1884; Tübingen, German Empire
- Died: 5 August 1957 (aged 73); Stuttgart, West Germany
- Education: University of Stuttgart, Technical University of Munich
- Occupation: Architect
- Buildings: Grossmarkthalle, Frankfurt am Main, Villa Reemtsma, Hamburg-Altona, Residential high-rise, Munich

Martin Elsaesser (28 May 1884 – 5 August 1957) was a German architect and professor of architecture. He is especially well known for the many churches he built.

== Life ==
From 1901 to 1906, Elsaesser studied architecture at the Technical University of Munich under Friedrich von Thiersch and the Technical University of Stuttgart under Theodor Fischer. In 1905 he won the competition for the Lutheran church of Baden-Baden and started to be active as a freelance architect.

From 1911 to 1913, he served as an assistant to Professor Paul Bonatz, at Stuttgart Technical University. In 1913, he became professor for medieval architecture at the same institution (until 1920).

From 1920 to 1925, he was managing director of the School of Arts and Crafts at Cologne (later known as the Kölner Werkschulen). In 1925, Ernst May, then government building surveyor in Frankfurt am Main, made him chief of the city's municipal building department which was responsible for the New Frankfurt project. Elsaesser kept that post until 1932. His largest construction during his time at Frankfurt was the Grossmarkthalle.

During the reign of National Socialism, Elsaesser did not receive any commissions. Nonetheless, he did not opt for emigration; instead he spent the war years in internal exile, pursuing architectural study tours and utopian designs.

After the war, he was professor of design at Munich Technical University from 1947 to 1956.

Many of his churches contain paintings by the artist Käte Schaller-Härlin.

His grandson was the international film historian Thomas Elsaesser.

== Buildings (selection) ==
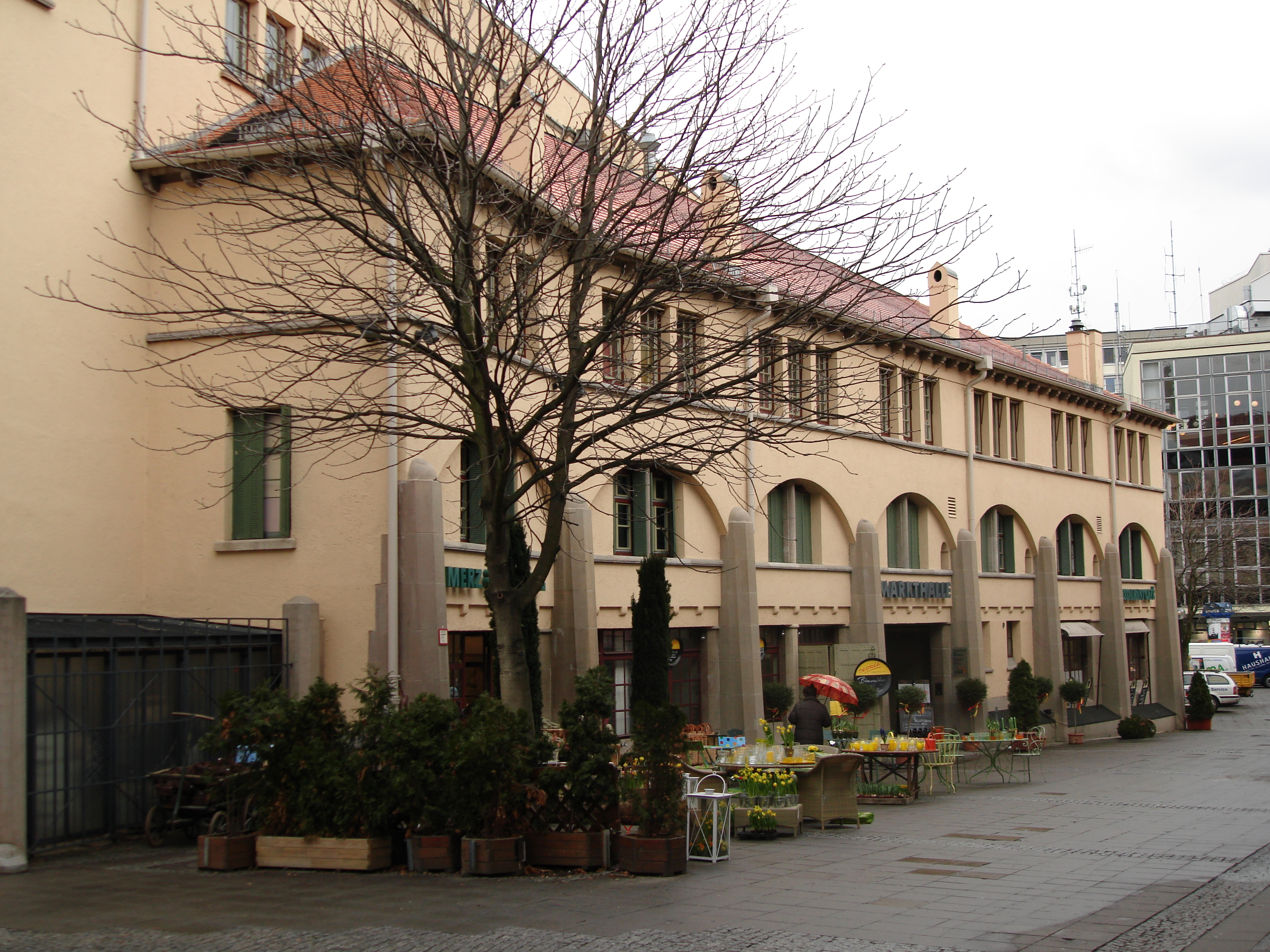
Stuttgart market

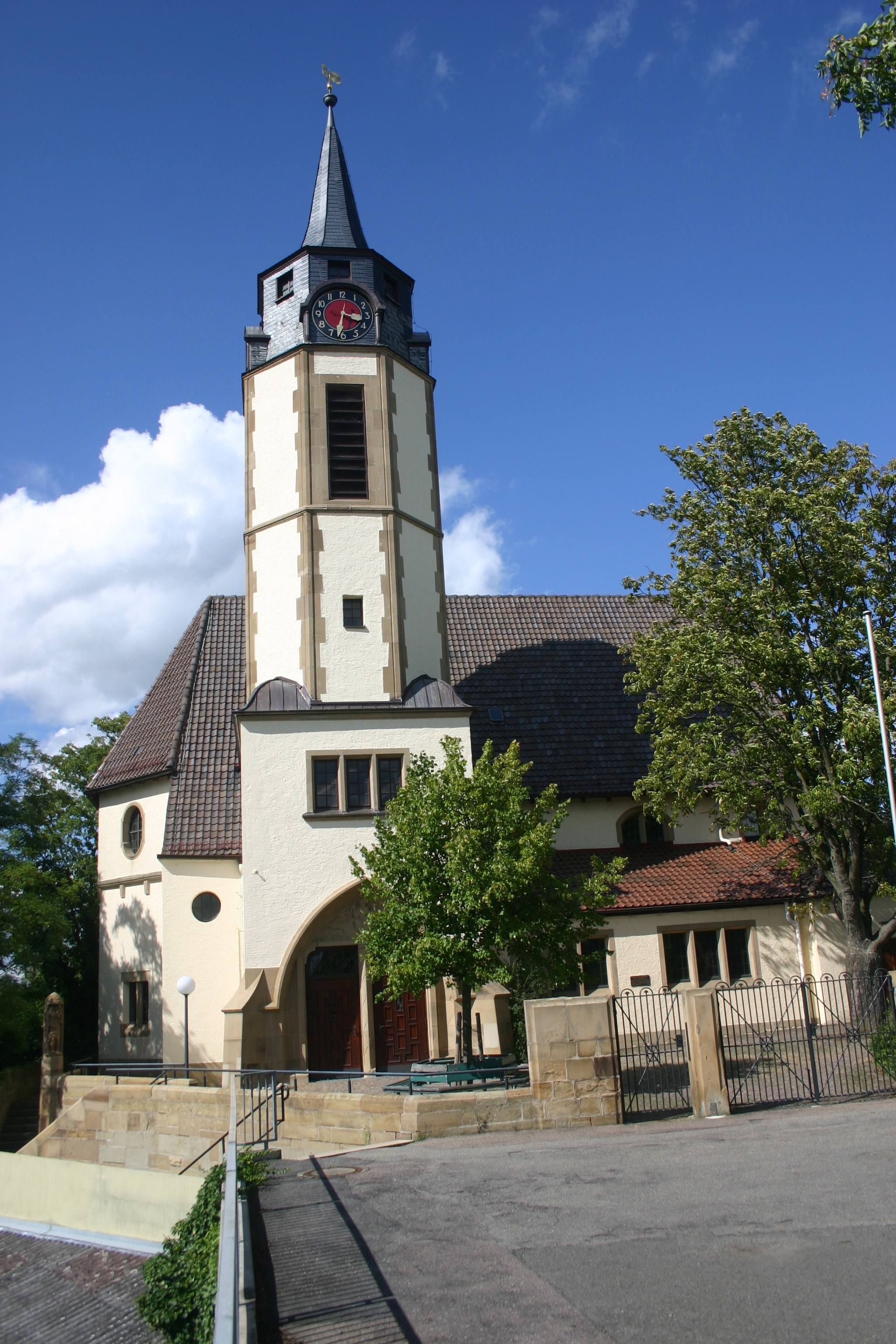
Lutheran church if St. George at Massenbach

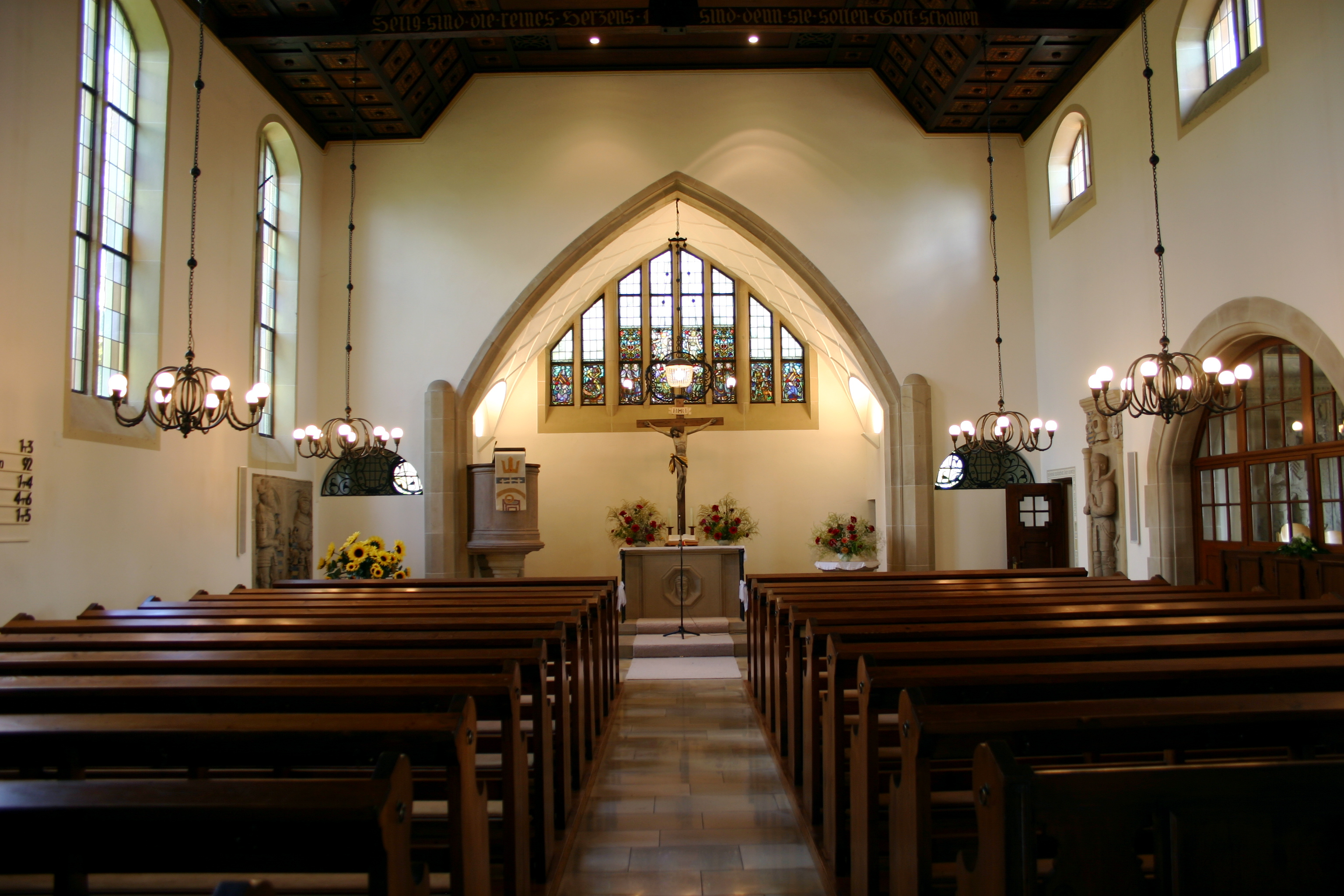
Lutheran church at Massenbach, interior

- 1909: Königliche Fachschule für Edelmetallindustrie Schwäbisch Gmünd, today Hochschule für Gestaltung
- 1909–1910: Lutheran church of St. Eberhard, Tübingen
- 1909–1910: Secondary School, Tübingen
- 1910: Railway bridge, Tübingen
- 1910–1913: Lutheran Church, Stuttgart-Gaisburg
- 1911: Lutheran church of St. George, Massenbach
- 1911–1914: Covered market, Stuttgart
- 1913–1914: Wagenburg-Gymnasium (secondary school), Stuttgart-Gänsheide
- 1922–1924: extension to Kölner Werkschulen
- 1922–1924: Office block for Rheinisches Braunkohlensyndikat, Mannheim
- 1924–1925: Private home, Dr. S., Cologne
- 1925–1926: Lutheran Südkirche, Esslingen
- 1925–1926: own home, Frankfurt am Main
- 1926: Part rebuilding of Lutheran Church of St. Laurentius, Stuttgart-Rohr (replaced in 1980)
- 1926–1928: Grossmarkthalle, Frankfurt am Main
- 1929–1931: Städtische und Universitätsklinik für Gemüts- und Nervenkranke, Frankfurt am Main, Niederrad
- 1928–1929: Primary school in Römerstadt, Frankfurt am Main
- 1930–1932: Villa Reemtsma, Hamburg-Altona
- 1937–1938: Sumerbank Headquarters, Ankara, Turkey
- 1950–1951: Residential high-rise, Munich
- 1953–1954: Rebuilding of Gustav-Siegle-Haus (Stuttgart Philharmonic)
