= Käte Schaller-Härlin =

German artist

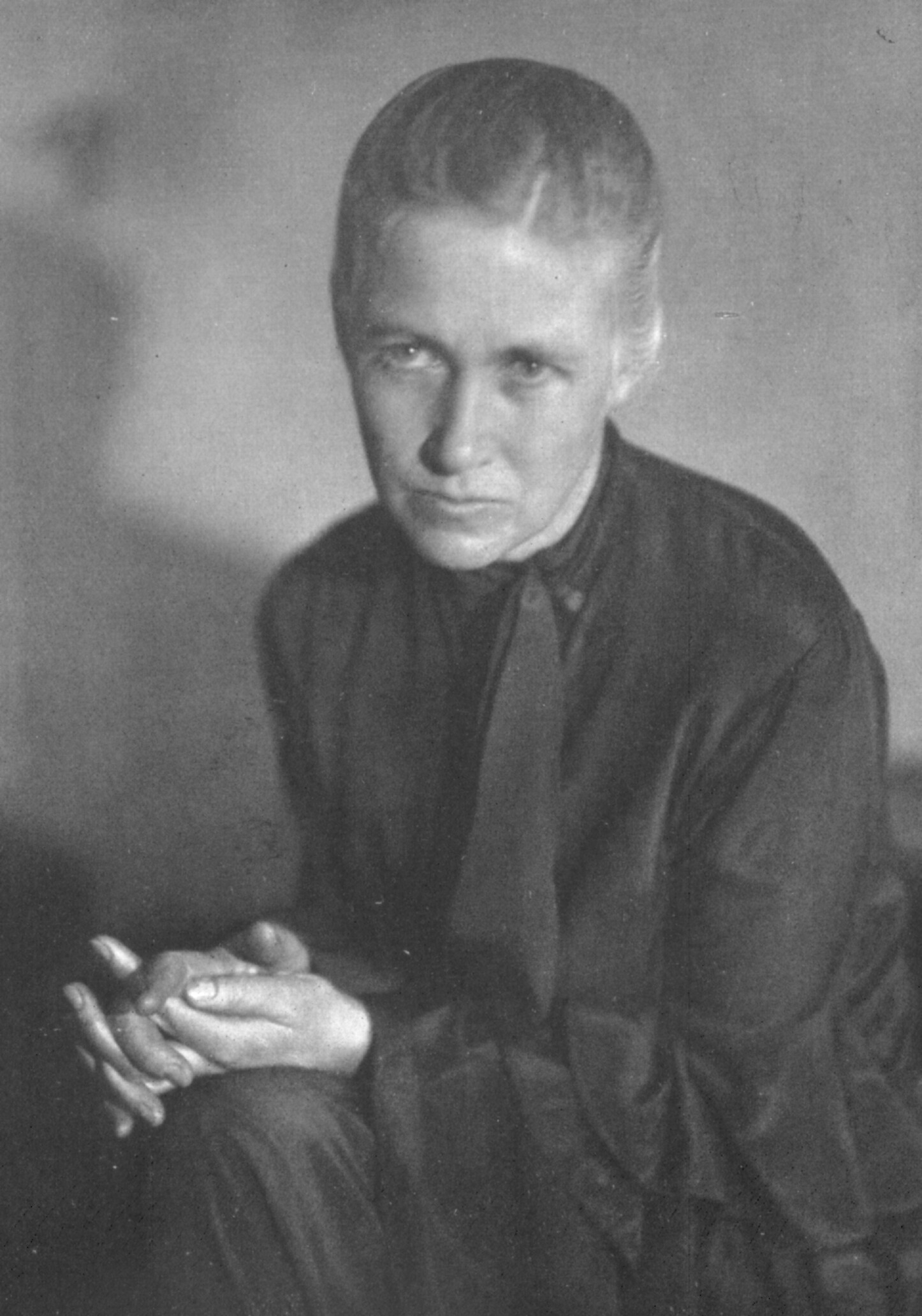
- Born: Käte Härlin; 19 October 1877; Mangalore, British India
- Died: 9 May 1973 (aged 95); Stuttgart, West Germany
- Known for: Painting
- Spouse: Hans-Otto Schaller

Käte Schaller-Härlin (Katharina Maria Schaller-Härlin), née Härlin (born 19 October 1877 in Mangalore; died 9 May 1973 in Stuttgart-Rotenberg), was a German painter known for portraits, still lifes, and monumental church paintings.

== Biography ==
Schaller-Härlin née Härlin was born on 19 October 1877 in Mangalore, India. She was the daughter of missionary parents. She moved to Germany as a young woman and attended arts and crafts school in Stuttgart and the women's academy in Munich. Her teachers included Adolf Hölzel and Angelo Jank. She subsequently travelled through Italy, Spain, and France. She is known for her portraits and her collaborations with the architect Martin Elsaesser. Elsaesser designed churches and Schaller-Härlin produced wall and glass painting for the interiors.

She studied at the Stuttgart School of Applied Arts under Magdalene Schweizer.

At the Württemberg Women Painters' Association, she took nude drawing lessons from Rudolf Yelin the Elder. From 1900 to 1904, she attended the Women's Academy of the Munich Women Artists' Association, where she published her first illustrations in the magazines Jugend and Meggendorfer Blätter. At the beginning of the 20th century, she undertook study trips to Italy and France.

In the summer semester of 1909, she took lessons from Adolf Hölzel at the Royal Academy of Fine Arts in Stuttgart (now the State Academy of Fine Arts Stuttgart).

In 1911, Härlin married the Stuttgart art historian and art dealer Hans Otto Schaller, who was killed in 1917 at Ypres. The couple had a daughter, Sibylle, born in 1913.

In 1944, her house and studio in Stuttgart were destroyed, and she moved with her housekeeper, Anna Zaiss, to Eschach, where she continued painting portraits. In 1950, she relocated to the Villa Schaller am Rotenberg in Stuttgart (built by Martin Elsaesser), where she lived until her death. Käte Schaller-Härlin continued to work at her easel well into old age; during the 1970s, she primarily painted still lifes.

Her grave is in the Pragfriedhof cemetery in Stuttgart.

In 2017 the Kunststiftung Hohenkarpfen Hausen (Hohenkarpfen Hausen Art Foundation) held a retrospective celebrating Schaller-Härlin's 140th birthday.

== Career ==
=== Portraiture ===
Schaller-Härlin became known primarily as a portrait painter. Thanks to an extensive network, she was able to support herself and raise her daughter. She portrayed many well-known personalities, including Theodor Heuss (the godfather of her daughter Sibylle) and Elisabeth Mann.

Notable sitters include:

- Theodor Heuss
- Elly Heuss-Knapp
- Hedwig Heuss
- John von Hieber
- Hugo Borst, Stuttgart art collector
- Erich Schairer from the Stuttgarter Zeitung
- Otto Jüngling, surgeon
- Walter Rehberg, pianist
- Martin Elsaesser, architect

A self-portrait of the artist from 1923 is now part of the Hugo Borst collection in the Staatsgalerie Stuttgart.

=== Murals and Stained Glass ===
In collaboration with the church architect Martin Elsaesser, she created murals and stained glass for various Protestant churches in Württemberg. Examples of this work can be found in the Protestant parish church in Stuttgart-Gaisburg (1913), the Protestant St. Martin's Church in Oberesslingen (1918), the Protestant St. Blasius Church in Holzelfingen (1909), the Protestant Luther Church in Baden-Baden Lichtental (1907 and 1910), and the Eberhard Church in Tübingen (1911).

Her body of work includes illustrations, sacred wall and stained-glass paintings, portraits, still lifes, and landscapes. Studies of Giotto in Florence influenced her monumental painting style, which, at the beginning of her career, was rooted in Art Nouveau. Over time, through exposure to the works of Henri Matisse, Maurice Denis, and Paul Cézanne, her style increasingly aligned with modern artistic movements—always contemporary, yet never abstract. Of particular note is her pioneering role as a woman in the field of sacred wall and stained-glass design.

Notable works include:

- Frescoes; parapet painting of the twelve disciples of Jesus in the Blasius Church in Holzelfingen
- Murals in the chancel of the Gaisburger Church in Stuttgart
- Stained glass windows and murals in the Luther Church of Lichtental near Baden-Baden
- Stained glass window of St. Martin's Church in Oberesslingen (1918)
- Stained glass windows of the Evangelical City Church in Oberndorf am Neckar
- Stained glass windows of the castle chapel in Tettnang
- Stained glass window of the Dionysius Church in Bodelshausen, donated in 1930 by the Gehring family from Bodelshausen
