= Thomas Elsaesser =

German film historian and professor (1943–2019)

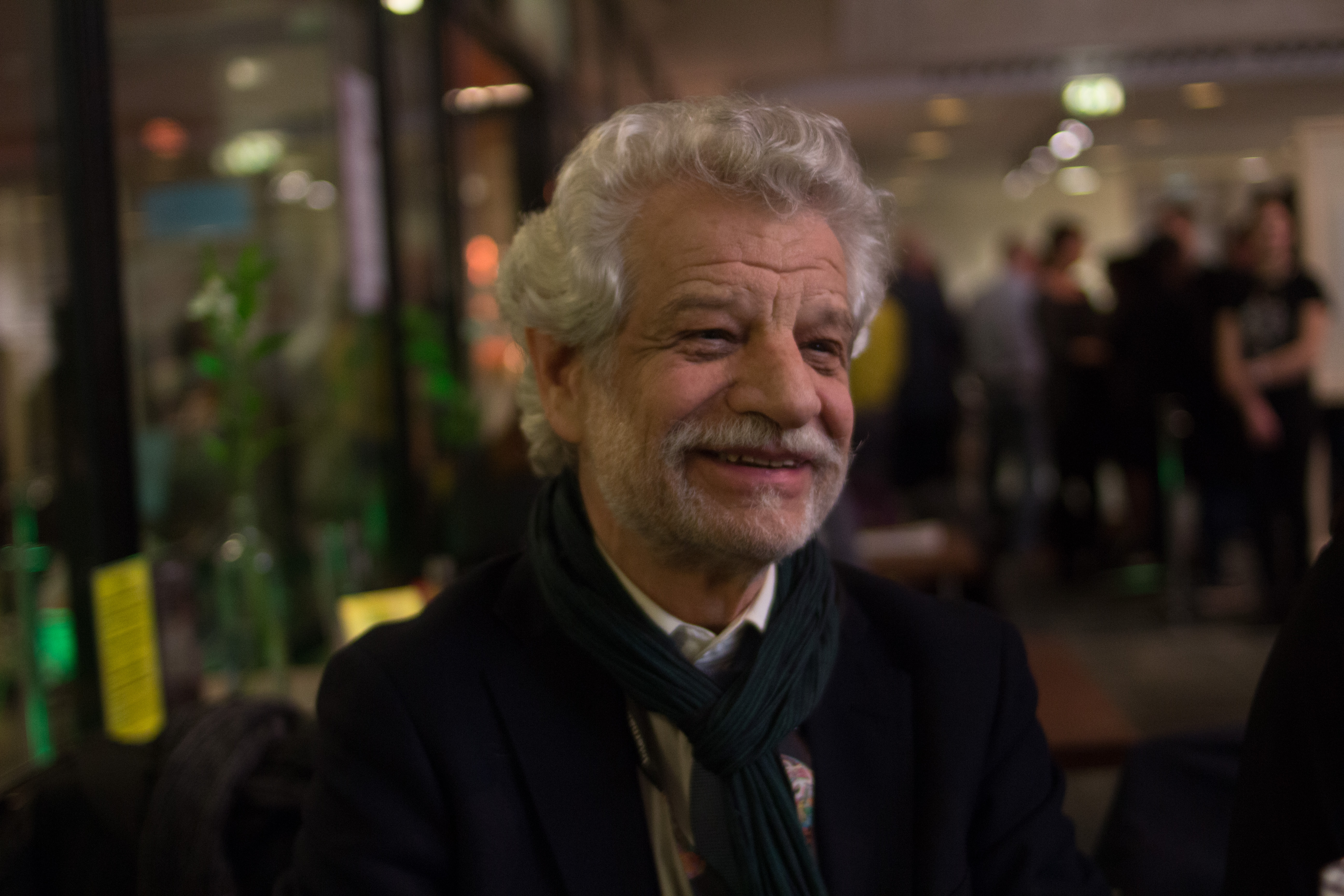
- Born: June 22, 1943; Berlin-Charlottenburg, Germany
- Died: December 4, 2019 (aged 76); Beijing, China
- Education: University of Heidelberg; University of Sussex

Thomas Elsaesser (22 June 1943 – 4 December 2019) was a German film historian and professor of Film and Television Studies at the University of Amsterdam. He was also the writer and director of The Sun Island, a documentary essay film about his grandfather, the architect Martin Elsaesser. He was married to scholar Silvia Vega-Llona.

== Early life and education ==
Thomas Elsaesser was born in 1943 in Berlin-Charlottenburg. The grandson of the architect Martin Elsaesser, he spent his childhood in Upper Franconia and in 1951 moved with his family to Mannheim, where from 1955 to 1962 he attended a Humanist Gymnasium (academic secondary school), before studying English and German Literature at the Ruprecht-Karl University in Heidelberg. In 1963, Elsaesser left Germany for the United Kingdom, where he studied English literature at the University of Sussex (1963–1966); after receiving his B.A. degree there, he spent a year (1967–68) at the Sorbonne in Paris.

In 1971, he received his doctorate in Comparative Literature with a thesis on Jules Michelet and Thomas Carlyle’s Histories of the French Revolution from the University of Sussex.

== Film journal work ==
Between 1968 and 1970, he contributed to and co-edited a film journal published by the University of Sussex Film Society (Brighton Film Review). Other editors included Phil Hardy, David Morse and Gary Herman. He subsequently edited a similar journal (Monogram) from 1971 to 1975 in London, encouraged by Peter Wollen and supported by a grant from the Education Department of the British Film Institute. Writing as a film critic and theorist of classical Hollywood cinema, it was his essay on Hollywood melodrama (Tales of Sound and Fury, 1972) that made Elsaesser known internationally.

== Academia ==
From 1972 to 1976, Elsaesser taught English, French and Comparative Literature at the University of East Anglia. In 1976, he established at UEA, together with Charles Barr, one of the first independent centres for Film Studies in the UK, with a full undergraduate, MA and PhD program. In addition to seminars on early cinema, on Alfred Hitchcock, and Fritz Lang, Elsaesser also initiated a course on the cinema of the Weimar Republic, which he co-taught with his colleague W.G. Sebald.

In 1991, Elsaesser was appointed to a chair at the University of Amsterdam. There, he founded the Department of Film and Television Studies, of which he was the head until 2000. In 1992, he initiated an international Master's and Doctoral Program, a book series (Film Culture in Transition, published by Amsterdam University Press and University of Chicago Press) and he was co-founder of the Amsterdam School of Cultural Analysis (ASCA), set up after the US-American model of a Humanities Graduate School. In 2003, Elsaesser founded the international MA Programme in Preservation and Presentation of the Moving Image.

From 1976, Elsaesser taught as a visiting professor at American universities including the University of Iowa, University of California (Los Angeles, San Diego, Berkeley, Irvine, Santa Barbara), New York University and Yale University. From 1993-1999, he was Professor II at the University of Bergen, Norway, and in 2005-2006 he held the Ingmar Bergman Chair at Stockholm University. In 2006-2007 he was a Leverhulme Professor at the University of Cambridge. In addition, he taught several times as a visiting professor at the University of Hamburg, the Free University of Berlin and the University of Vienna. In 2003, he was a Fellow at the IFK-International Research Center for Cultural Studies Vienna, in 2004 Fellow at the Sackler Institute of the University of Tel Aviv, and in 2007 Overseas Fellow at Churchill College, Cambridge. From 2006-2012, Elsaesser taught one semester a year at Yale University as a visiting professor. Since 2013 he was visiting professor, The School of the Arts at Columbia University.

From 2000 to 2005, he was in charge of an international research project on "Cinema Europe" at the University of Amsterdam. The project resulted in several book publications on European cinema and film history, such as a study on the relationship between Hollywood and Europe (European Cinema – Face to Face with Hollywood), on Contemporary Cinephilia (Cinephilia - Movies, Love and Memory), on the European avant-garde and film society movement (Moving Forward Looking Back), on Lars von Trier’s cinema as gaming prototype (Playing the Waves) and the European Film Festival circuit (Film Festivals - From European Geopolitics to Global Cinephilia). Other studies from the project were devoted to comparative studies, such as Post-classical Narration and World Cinema, Cinema, War and Memory, Finnish Visual Culture, Music in European cinema of the 1990s, and several studies on European Cities and Media Culture.

== Assessment of work ==
Elsaesser is an important representative of international film studies, whose books and essays on film theory, genre theory, Hollywood, new film history, media archaeology, new media, mind-game film, European auteur cinema, and installation art have been published in more than 20 languages. Elsaesser is known primarily for his studies on almost every period of German film history, from early film (A Second Life: German Cinema's First Decade), the cinema of the Weimar Republic (Weimar Cinema and After: Germany's Historical Imaginary) and Fritz Lang (Metropolis), including the much-cited New German Cinema – A History, as well as a monograph on Rainer Werner Fassbinder, a study on the afterlife of the Nazi era in German post-war film, an anthology on the work of Harun Farocki and The BFI Companion to German Cinema.

Besides his publications on German cinema, Elsaesser has also edited and co-edited collections on Early Cinema, Television, New Media, as well as co-authoring a book on Contemporary Hollywood (Studying Contemporary American Film, with Warren Buckland) and an innovative Introduction to Film Theory (Film Theory: An Introduction through the Senses, with Malte Hagener).

== Awards ==
His book New German Cinema: A History won both the 1990 Jay Leyda Prize (awarded by Anthology Film Archives in New York City) and the Katherine Singer Kovács Prize in Film and Video Studies (awarded by the Society for Cinema and Media Studies). His Weimar Cinema and After: Germany's Historical Imaginary received once more the Katherine Singer Kovács Prize for best film book of 1998. His book European Cinema Face to Face with Hollywood won the 2006 Premio Limina-Carnica, an annual prize awarded by the University of Udine Film Conference for the best international book in cinema studies.

In 2006, Elsaesser received the Royal Order of the Ridder in de Orde van de Nederlandse Leeuw. In 2008 the Society for Film and Media Studies honored him with a "Distinguished Career Achievement Award". Also in 2008 he was elected Corresponding Fellow of the British Academy. In March 2017, Elsaesser was awarded a doctor honoris causa by the Université de Liège

On the occasion of Elsaesser's 60th birthday, Die Spur durch den Spiegel ("The path through the mirror") was issued, edited by Malte Hagener, Johannes N. Schmidt, und Michael Wedel. A further commemorative publication was issued for his 65th birthday, with contributions by colleagues and former students: Mind the Screen: Media Concepts According to Thomas Elsaesser.

== Death ==
On 4 December 2019, Thomas Elsaesser died unexpectedly aged 76 in Beijing, where he was scheduled to give a lecture.

== Selected bibliography ==
- New German Cinema: A History (1989, Basingstoke: Macmillan and Rutgers University Press; reprinted 1994; translated into Chinese and Hungarian)
- Early Cinema: Space Frame Narrative (1990, edited: London: British Film Institute and Indiana University Press)
- Writing for the Medium: Television in Transition (1994, co-edited; Amsterdam: Amsterdam University Press)
- A Second Life: German Cinema's First Decades (1996, edited: Amsterdam: Amsterdam University Press)
- Fassbinder's Germany: History Identity Subject (1996, Amsterdam: Amsterdam University Press; translated into German, 2001 and French, 2005)
- Cinema Futures: Cain, Abel or Cable? (1998, co-edited: Amsterdam: Amsterdam University Press; translated into Korean, 2002)
- The BFI Companion to German Cinema (1999, co-edited: British Film Institute)
- Weimar Cinema and After (2000, London: Routledge; German edition: 1999)
- Metropolis (2001, London: British Film Institute; translated into German, 2001)
- Studying Contemporary American Film (2002, with Warren Buckland, New York: Oxford University Press; Japanese translation 2009)
- Filmgeschichte und frühes Kino [Film history and early cinema] (2002, Munich: edition text and commentary)
- Kino der Kaiserzeit [Cinema in the Kaiser's Time] (2002, co-edited: Munich: edition text and commentary)
- The Last Great American Picture Show (2004, co-edited; Amsterdam: AUP)
- Harun Farocki: Working on the Sightlines (2004, edited; Amsterdam: AUP)
- Terreur, Mythes et Representation [Terror, Myths and Representation] (2005, Lille: thousand eyes edition)
- European Cinema: Face to Face with Hollywood (2005, Amsterdam: AUP)
- Terror und Trauma [Terror and Trauma] (2007, Berlin: Kulturverlag Kadmos)
- Filmgeschichte zur Einführung [Introduction to Film History] (2007, with Malte Hagener, Hamburg: Junius)
- Video Vortex Reader: Responses to YouTube (2008) essay: "Constructive Instability"
- Hollywood Heute: Geschichte, Gender und Nation [Hollywood Today: History, Gender and Country] (2009, Berlin: Bertz + Fischer)
- Film Theory: an introduction through the senses (with Malte Hagener) (2010, New York: Routledge. Second, revised edition 2015)
- The Persistence of Hollywood (2011, New York: Routledge)
- Terror and Trauma: German Cinema after 1945 (2013, New York: Routledge)
- Körper, Tod und Technik – Metamorphosen des Kriegsfilms [Bodies, Death and Technology – Metamorphosis of War Films] (with Michael Wedel) (2016, Paderborn: Konstanz UP)
- Film History as Media Archaeology (2016, Amsterdam: Amsterdam University Press)
- European Cinema and Continental Philosophy: film as thought experiment (2018, London: Bloomsbury).
- The Mind-Game Film: Distributed Agency, Time Travel, and Productive Pathology (2021, New York: Routledge)
