= The Trial of Donald Westhof =

1927 film directed by Fritz Wendhausen

- Directed by: Fritz Wendhausen
- Written by: Fritz Wendhausen
- Starring: Oskar Homolka; Karin Evans; Imre Ráday; Paul Henckels
- Cinematography: Curt Courant; Günther Rittau
- Music by: Artur Guttmann
- Production company: Universum Film AG
- Distributed by: Parufamet
- Release date: 29 September 1927
- Running time: 113 minutes
- Country: Germany
- Languages: Silent; German intertitles

The Trial of Donald Westhof (German: Der Kampf des Donald Westhof) is a 1927 German silent crime film directed by Fritz Wendhausen and starring Oskar Homolka, Karin Evans and Imre Ráday. It was shot at the Babelsberg Studios in Berlin. The film's sets were designed by the art director Robert Neppach. It premiered at the Ufa-Palast am Zoo in Berlin. Produced by UFA, it was distributed as part of the Parufamet agreement.

== Cast ==
- Oskar Homolka as Justizrat Lessing
- Karin Evans as Olga Wolgast
- Imre Ráday as Donald Westhof
- Paul Henckels as Professor Westhof, Donalds Vater
- Hermann Vallentin as Spieß, ein Gastwirt
- Paul Otto as Gerichtsvorsitzender
- Erna Morena as Thea Lessing, seine Frau
- Lina Lossen as Leni Westhof
- Nikolai Malikoff as Kußmaul, ein Schieber
- Emilie Kurz as Frau Spieß
- Elizza La Porta as Bertha Spieß, beider Tochter
- Max Gülstorff as Defense lawyer
- Erich Kaiser-Titz as Prosecutor
- Valeska Stock as Frau Busse
- Emil Heyse as Oberlehrer

== Bibliography ==
- Nichols, Nina Da Vinci. Pirandello and Film. University of Nebraska Press, 1995.
