= Karin Evans =

German actress

- Born: 25 September 1907; Johannesburg, South Africa
- Died: 1 July 2004 (aged 96); Berlin, Germany
- Occupations: Film actor, Stage actor
- Years active: 1927-1964

Karin Evans (1907–2004) was a South African-born German stage and film actress. Evans was born in Johannesburg to one British and one German parent. In 1923 she moved to Berlin to study theatre, and began performing in the stage productions of Max Reinhardt. She made her film debut in the 1927 silent crime film The Trial of Donald Westhof (1927) and then appeared intermittently in a mixture of leading and supporting roles. In 1964 she appeared in the comedy Fanny Hill which proved to be her final screen appearance. She was married to the painter Wolf Hoffmann.

== Selected filmography ==
- The Trial of Donald Westhof (1927)
- Boycott (1930)
- The Last Company (1930)
- The Concert (1931)
- The Gentleman Without a Residence (1934)
- My Life for Maria Isabella (1935)
- Pygmalion (1935)
- Ich klage an (1941)
- Blum Affair (1948)
- Street Acquaintances (1948)
- Such a Charade (1953)
- The Perfect Couple (1954)
- Love Without Illusions (1955)
- Without You All Is Darkness (1956)
- Sweetheart of the Gods (1960)
- Fanny Hill (1964)

== Bibliography ==
- Frasier, David K. Russ Meyer-The Life and Films: A Biography and a Comprehensive, Illustrated and Annotated Filmography and Bibliography. McFarland, 1997.
