= Gisela Trowe =

German actress

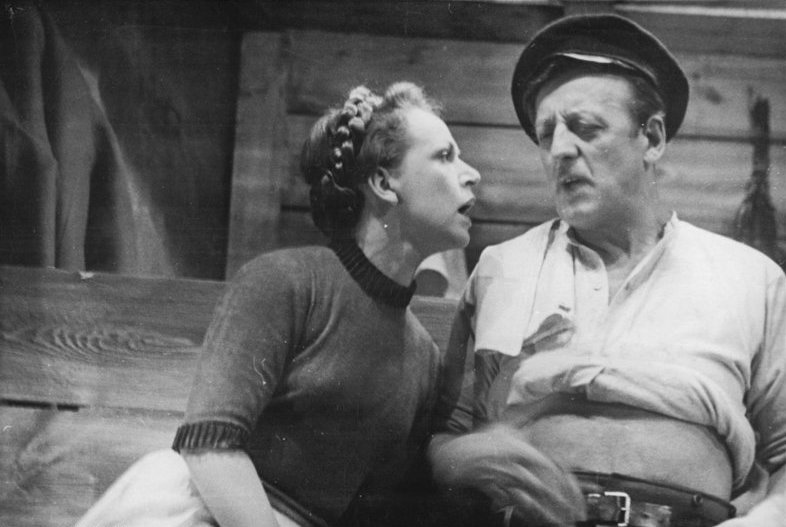
Trowe in Herr Puntila und sein Knecht, 1949

Gisela Trowe (5 September 1922 in Dortmund – 5 April 2010 in Hamburg) was a German actress and voice actress.

== Selected filmography ==
- 1948: Street Acquaintances
- 1948: The Time with You
- 1948: The Morgenrot Mine
- 1948: Affaire Blum
- 1951: The Lost One
- 1952: Under the Thousand Lanterns
- 1953: Not Afraid of Big Animals
- 1956: Damals in Paris
- 1957: Goodbye, Franziska
- 1957: Wo du hingehst
- 1960: I Learned That in Paris
- 1963: And So to Bed
- 1969: Eika Katappa
- 1969: Argila
- 1970: Wie ein Blitz (TV miniseries)
- 1971: The Bordello
- 1980: Teegebäck und Platzpatronen (TV film)
- 1981: Alles im Eimer
- 1987: Eine geschlossene Gesellschaft (TV film)
- 1987–2008: Der Landarzt (TV series, 67 episodes)
- 1988: Die Bertinis (TV miniseries)
- 1991: Großstadtrevier: Gelegenheit macht Diebe (TV)
- 1992: Kommissar Klefisch: Ein unbekannter Zeuge (TV)
- 1992/1999: Unser Lehrer Doktor Specht (TV series, 52 episodes)
- 1997: Babes' Petrol
- 2000: Cold Is the Evening Breeze
- 2001: Die Braut meines Freundes (TV film)
- 2003: Gestern gibt es nicht (TV film)
- 2006: Mütter, Väter, Kinder (TV film)
- 2007: In aller Freundschaft: Heimlichkeiten (TV)
- 2009: Für immer Venedig (TV film)
- 2009: Beloved Berlin Wall
