= Blockupy movement =

Movement protesting against austerity

- Part of the anti-austerity protests
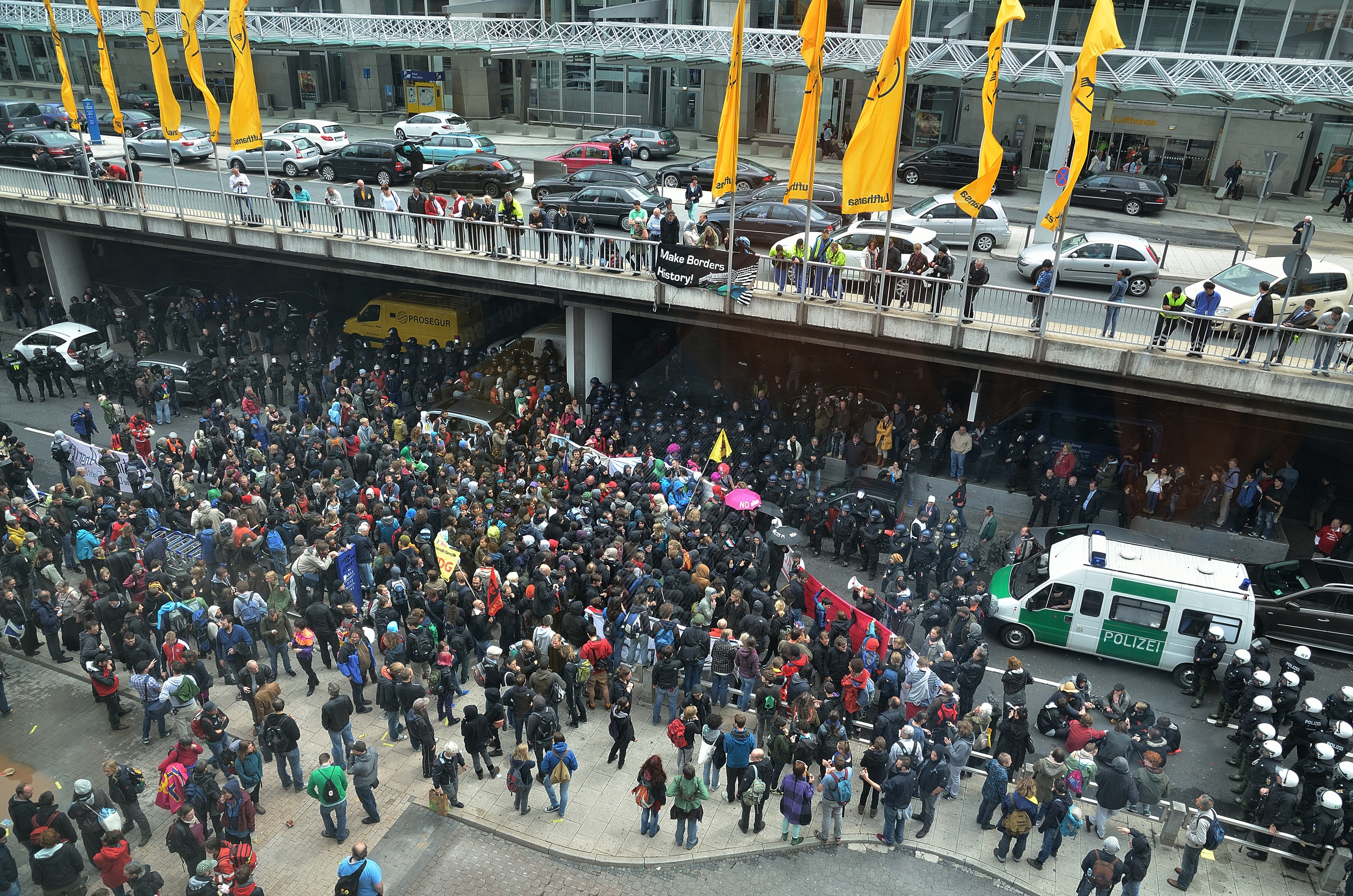
- A Blockupy protest at Frankfurt Airport in 2013
- Location: Primarily Frankfurt-am-Main, with some actions across Germany
- Caused by: Economic and social inequality, corporate influence over government, inter alia.
- Goals: Rejection of austerity by European Central Bank; Anti-capitalist and anti-globalization social change; An end to deportation and anti-immigration border control
- Methods: Occupation; Non violent protest; Civil disobedience; Picketing; Demonstrations; Direct action

Parties
ATTAC; Die Linke; Syriza; Verdi and other German trade unions; Local socialist, communist, anarchist and antifa groups	Hesse State Police, including Wachpolizei units; Bundespolizei; Bereitschaftspolizei units from the aforementioned police forces

Blockupy is a movement protesting against austerity. The Blockupy alliance includes trade unions and Germany's Linkspartei.

Representing grass-roots critics of supranational financial institutions such as the “troika”: the European Commission (EC), European Central Bank (ECB) and International Monetary Fund (IMF), its name is derived from the Occupy movement which sprang up in Wall Street in 2011.

Organisers have verbally supported (since July 2015, former) Greek finance minister Yanis Varoufakis's criticism that ECB policy towards Athens is "asphyxiating".

== History ==
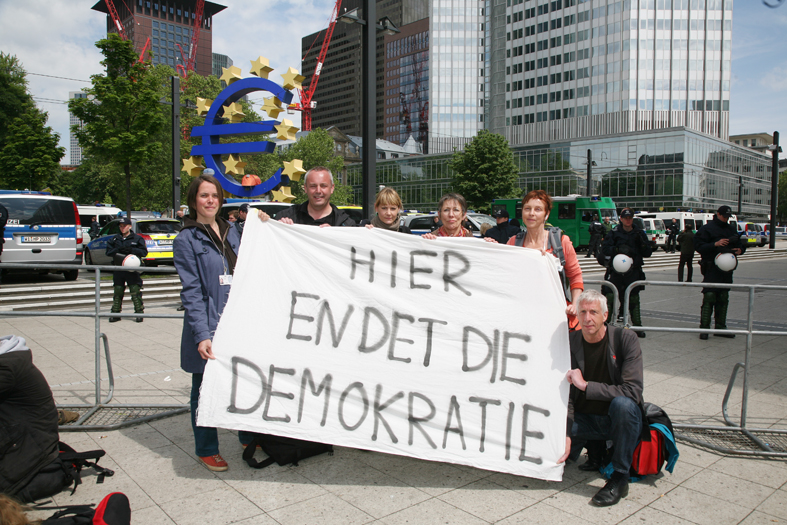
A Blockupy protest outside the then-current European Central Bank building in 2012. The banner says: "Democracy ends here."

Thousands of people attended the first demonstration in Frankfurt in 2012.

In 2013, protests in Frankfurt were met with heavy police violence. A peaceful demonstration was stopped, 1000 protesters were kettled for hours, and hundreds were injured, several severely. Police action was criticized heavily afterward nationally and internationally.

=== European Central Bank opening ===
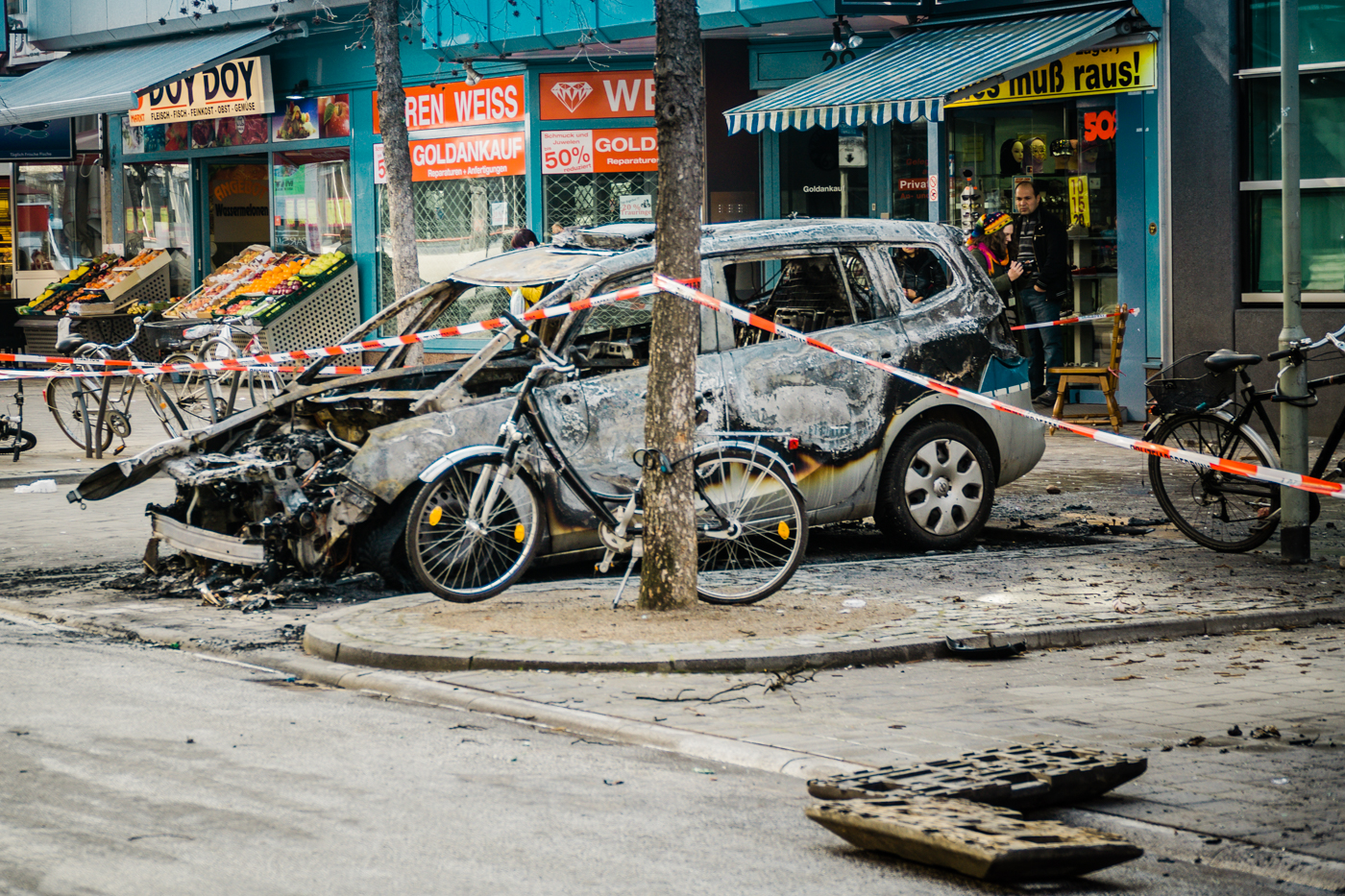
Police car burned down during Blockupy movement protests, 18 March 2015

On 18 March 2015, the day of the opening of the Seat of the European Central Bank, Blockupy organized a major protest in Frankfurt attended by between 17,000 and 20,000 people from Germany and other parts of Europe, including 10,000 people at the main rally. The Seat of the European Central Bank, the ECB's new headquarters, was selected as the venue for the demonstration so as to highlight the contradiction between the ECB's lavish spending on its own US$1.4-billion building while forcing cuts and market reforms on countries like Greece and Cyprus. Ulrich Wilken, an organiser, said: “Our protest is against the ECB, as a member of the troika, that, despite the fact that it is not democratically elected, hinders the work of the Greek government. We want the austerity politics to end.” The pan-European protests included members of Greece's radical left governing party Syriza and Spain's anti-corruption Podemos.

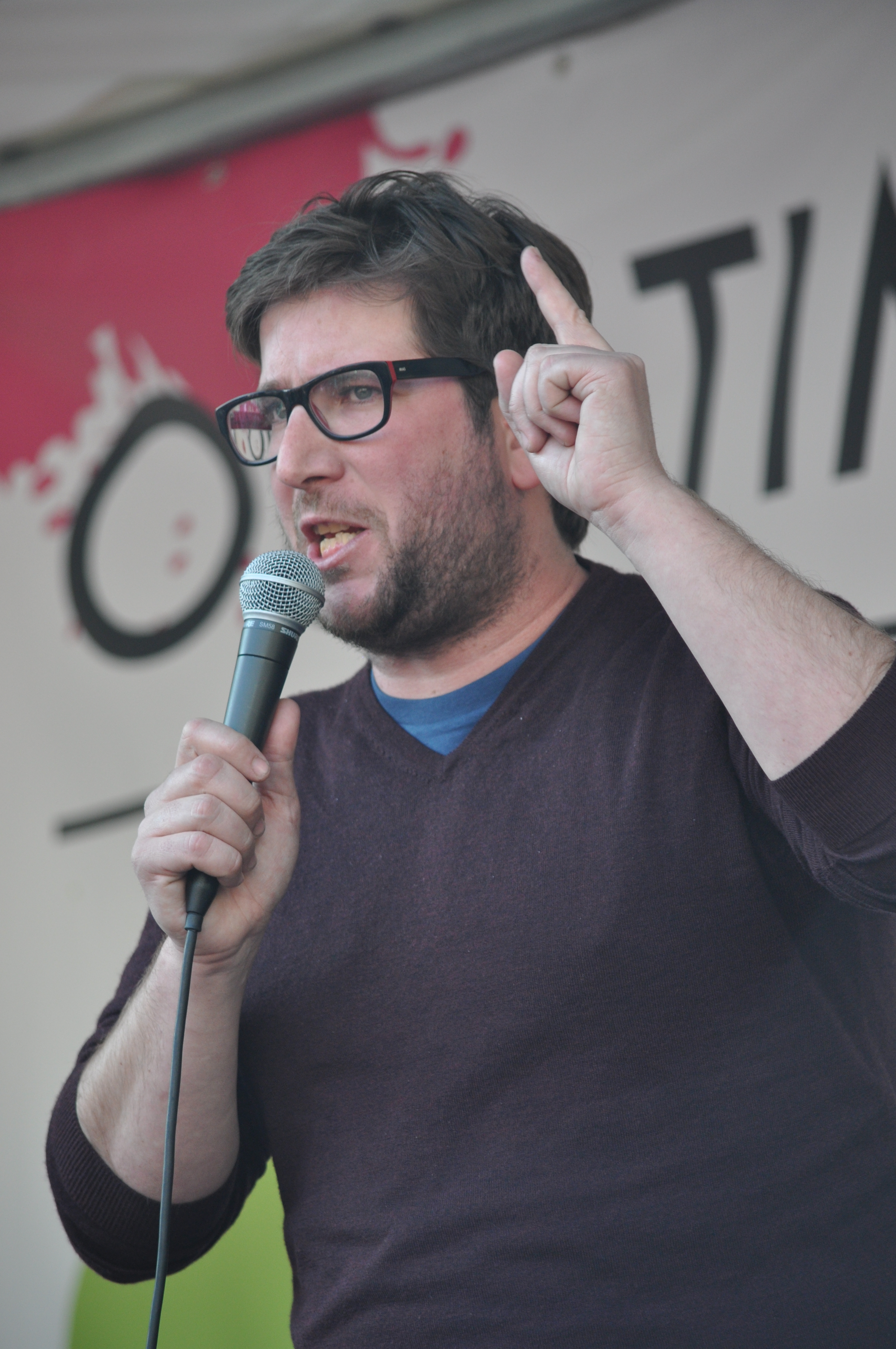
Miguel Urbán talking at the Römerberg Blockupy event

The day included both peaceful protest and violent direct action. 10,000 people met at Römerberg, where speakers included Sahra Wagenknecht from the Linkspartei, globalization critic Naomi Klein, comedian Urban Priol, Giorgios Chondros from Syriza and Miguel Urbán from Podemos. On the other side of Frankfurt, around 3,000 attempted to break through the security fence of the ECB. At least 350 people were arrested, and 280 people were injured, among them 150 police officers and 130 protesters from Blockupy. Violent scenes were reported. Organisers said police sparked this violence with provocative actions, and described it as "not what Blockupy planned", while the Gewerkschaft der Polizei police union claimed that the violent protesters were organized and rejected claims of provocation. The leader of the Hesse branch of the Linkspartei, a member of the Blockupy alliance, said that the Blockupy movement had "failed" in its aim to offer peaceful protest and had brought the wider anti-capitalist movement into disrepute, a claim which was rejected by some of his party colleagues. The Blockupy representative from the Attac group described themselves as "appalled and saddened by some actions", but said that the majority of the protest was justified civil disobedience. Blockupy organizers from the Ums Ganze and Interventionist Left groups explicitly refused to distance themselves from the violence and expressed joy over the events. Alongside the official members of the Blockupy alliance, the protests were also possibly attended by small groups at the opposite end of the political spectrum, including members of the far-right and neo-Nazis, although their number has not been determined. The Federal Office for the Protection of the Constitution announced an investigation into whether the uninvited right-wing groups played a role in the violence that followed.

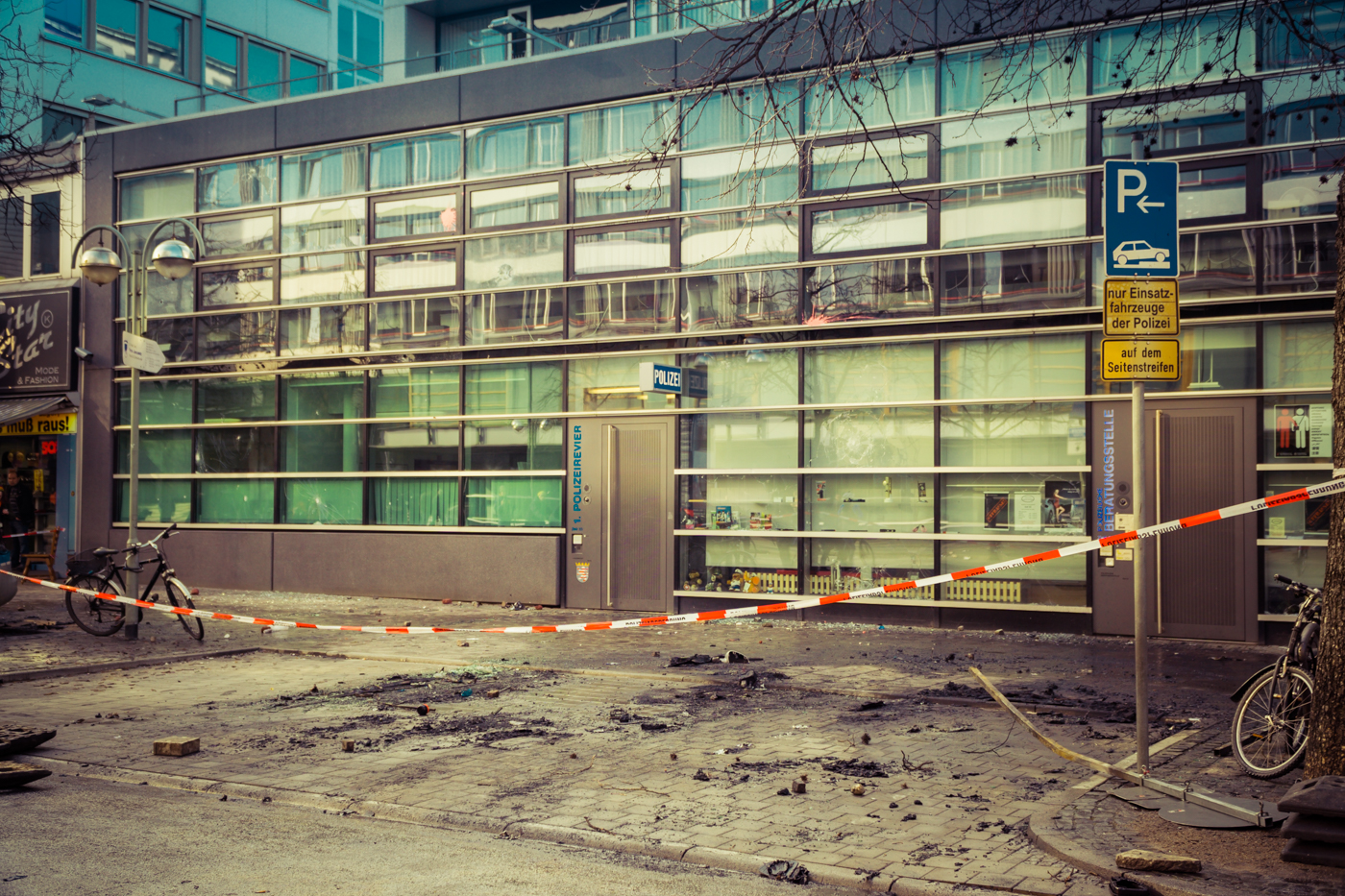
Damage done to Police station at the Frankfurt Zeil during European Central Bank protests 2015

Protesters attacked police officers with stones ahead of the demonstration. Video footage showed police dragging at least one person away. Police used tear gas, water cannons and pepper spray against people in the ECB area, and in turn reported that "pepper spray or an acidic liquid" had been used against officers. As well as the action against the ECB, some attendees also targeted private cars, shops, banks, firefighters and transport infrastructure. Eight bus and tram stops were vandalised, causing around €50,000 of damage, and trams and fire engines were attacked with stones. According to police figures, 30 cars, including some police vehicles, were set on fire. A home for refugees was also supposedly attacked and staff threatened, which later turned out to be incorrect.

== See also ==
- Occupy movement, a similar movement from which the title is derived
  - Occupy Berlin, the German branch of this movement
