= The Last Company =

1930 film directed by Curtis Bernhardt

- Film poster
- Directed by: Curtis Bernhardt
- Written by: Heinz Goldberg; Henry Koster; Hans Rehfisch; Ludwig von Wohl; Hans Wilhelm
- Produced by: Joe May
- Starring: Conrad Veidt; Karin Evans; Erwin Kalser; Else Heller
- Cinematography: Günther Krampf
- Edited by: Carl Winston
- Music by: Ralph Benatzky; Franz Grothe
- Production company: UFA
- Distributed by: UFA
- Release date: 14 March 1930
- Running time: 79 minutes
- Country: Germany
- Language: German

The Last Company (German: Die letzte Kompagnie) is a 1930 German war film directed by Curtis Bernhardt and starring Conrad Veidt, Karin Evans and Erwin Kalser. It was part of the popular cycle of Prussian films which portrayed patriotic scenes from Prussian history. It was produced by UFA in Berlin at their Babelsburg Studios, under the direction of Kurt Bernhardt, with the film's set design overseen by Andrej Andrejew. Location shots were taken around Havelland in Brandenburg.

Dubbed into English by UFA, it was released in the USA under the title Thirteen Men and a Girl by Talking Picture Epics Inc. in 1932, while Protex Pictures Corp. handled its German-language-only release there that same year.

It was remade in 1967 as A Handful of Heroes.

== Synopsis ==
Following the Battle of Jena in 1806, the French armies commanded by Napoleon are about to overrun Prussia. A small detachment of Prussian troops take up position in a windmill and resolve to fight to the last man to hold them off for as long as possible. Meanwhile, the windmill owner's daughter chooses to stay and fight alongside them.

== Cast ==
- Conrad Veidt as Hauptmann Burk
- Karin Evans as Dore
- Erwin Kalser as The miller
- Else Heller as His wife
- Maria Pederson as The maid
- Heinrich Gretler as Pelle
- Paul Henckels as Pitsch
- Ferdinand Asper as Goetzel
- Martin Herzberg as Heller
- Werner Schott as Biese
- Philipp Manning as Moellmann
- Max Hiller as Machnow
- Ferdinand Hart as Klotz
- Alexander Granach as Haberling
- Gustav Püttjer as Püttjer
- Albert Karchow as Wernicke
- Horst von Harbou as Stibbe

== Bibliography ==
- Bock, Hans-Michael; Bergfelder, Tim, eds. (2009). The Concise Cinegraph: Encyclopaedia of German Cinema. New York: Berghahn Books. ISBN 978-1-57181-655-9.
