= Gustav-Siegle-Haus =

German music venue

Coordinates: 48°46′22″N 9°10′48″E

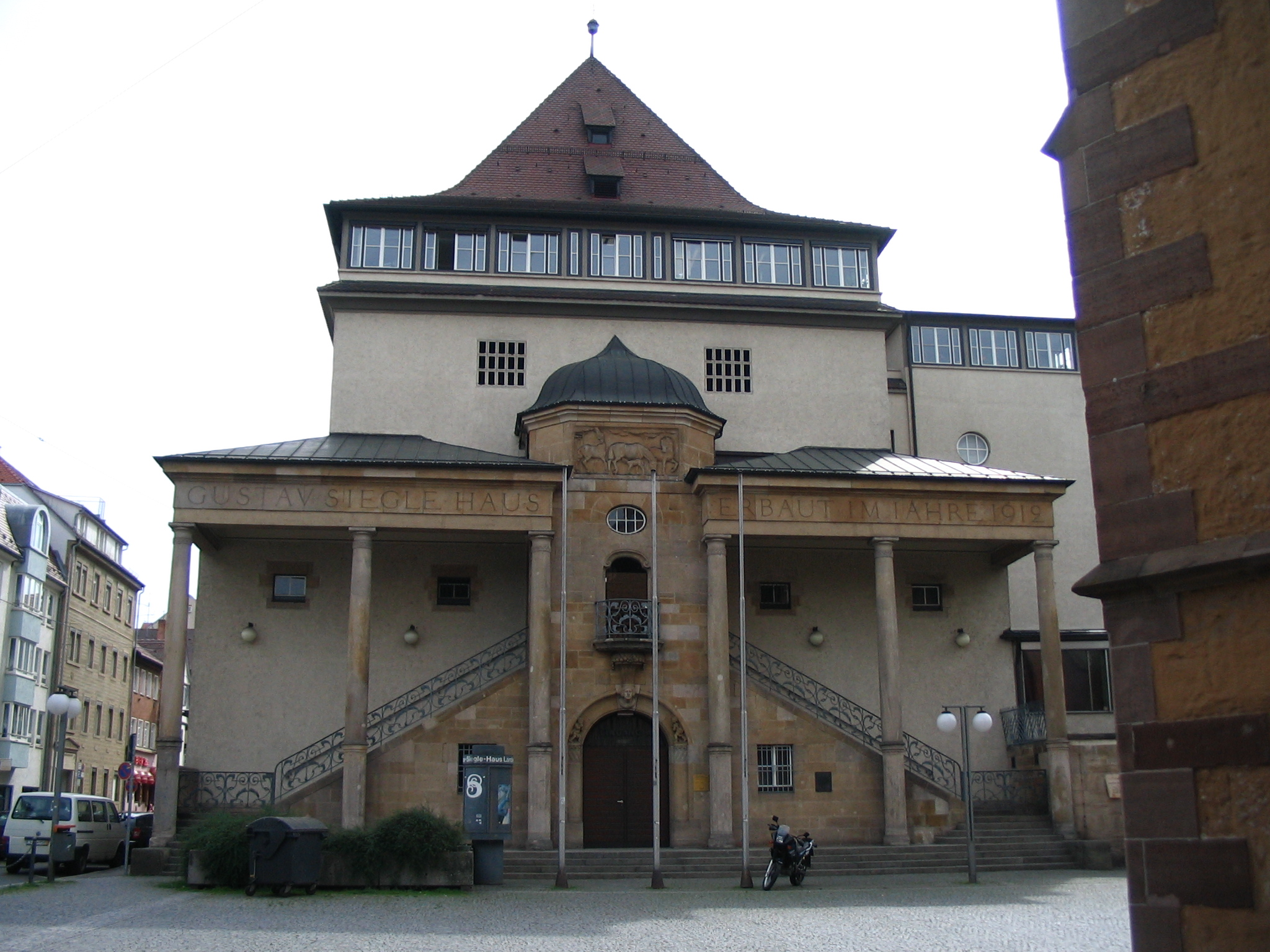
Gustav-Siegle-Haus

Gustav-Siegle-Haus is a music venue located in Stuttgart. The building was completed in 1912 by architect Theodor Fischer. The structure was rebuilt between 1953 and 1954 by architect Martin Elsaesser after it was destroyed by air raids during World War II. Past performers include Scorpions, Motörhead and AC/DC.
