= New German Cinema: A History =

1990 book by Thomas Elsaesser

- Author: Thomas Elsaesser
- Language: English
- Subject: New German Cinema
- Publisher: Rutgers University Press
- Publication date: 1989
- Publication place: United States
- Pages: 430
- ISBN: 978-0-8135-1392-8

New German Cinema: A History is a 1989 book about the New German Cinema, a film movement in the second half of the 20th century. It was written by the German-British film historian Thomas Elsaesser and published by Rutgers University Press.

== Synopsis ==
The book is an analysis of the New German Cinema, a film movement in West Germany during the second half of the 20th century, which according to Elsaesser peaked in the 1970s. The movement included filmmakers such as Rainer Werner Fassbinder, Wim Wenders, Werner Herzog and Volker Schlöndorff. Elsaesser brings up political, historical, biographical and other perspectives and highlights the importance of state subsidies for the movement's existence.

== Reception ==
In the German Studies Review, Richard C. Helt described the book as a welcome update to the previous studies of the New German Cinema in English, all of which were from the early 1980s. Publishers Weekly commended Elsaesser's analysis of how German culture and regional character played into the movement and wrote that the book's explanation of the film-subsidies system is an "equal triumph".

New German Cinema: A History was awarded the Katherine Singer Kovács Prize in Film and Video Studies and the Jay Leyda Prize in 1990.
