= Cinderella (1955 film) =

1955 film

- Directed by: Fritz Genschow
- Written by: Fritz Genschow; Renée Stobrawa; Charles Perrault; Jacob Grimm (story); Wilhelm Grimm (story)
- Produced by: Fritz Genschow
- Starring: Rita-Maria Nowotny; Renée Stobrawa; Werner Stock
- Cinematography: Gerhard Huttula
- Edited by: Albert Baumeister
- Music by: Richard Stauch
- Production company: Fritz Genschow Films
- Release date: 4 September 1955
- Running time: 72 minutes
- Country: West Germany
- Language: German

Cinderella (German: Aschenputtel) is a 1955 West German family film directed by Fritz Genschow and starring Rita-Maria Nowotny, Renée Stobrawa and Werner Stock. It is based on the namesake fairytale by Charles Perrault and the Brothers Grimm.

== Plot ==
In a faraway kingdom, a beautiful young girl, Margaret, lives with her mean stepmother and two spoiled stepsisters. The Prince of the kingdom throws a ball to find a wife. Margaret wants to attend, but her family thinks her too ugly and stupid, calling her a mere “Cinderella”. However, a good Fairy intervenes and provides Margaret with the means to attend the Prince’s Ball. The Prince, of course, is enthralled upon meeting Margaret, for she is the only woman in the kingdom who possesses the spiritual bounty of inner beauty. Margaret runs away from the Prince before he can announce his intentions, however; she leaves behind only her slipper. The Prince searches the kingdom for the tiny foot which fits the slipper; some women even go so far as to mutilate their big feet to try to fool the Prince. The Prince eventually finds Margaret, and asks her to be his “Cinderella.” A big wedding follows, and the fairy tale couple live happily ever after.

== Background ==
Filming took place from 11 July 1955 to 8 August 1955 in the studio in Berlin-Wannsee. The prince's castle is on Peacock Island. Other outdoor shots were taken at Charlottenburg Palace, Grunewald hunting lodge, in the Glienicke Volkspark and at the Immanuel Hospital. Waldemar Volkmer created the film sets. Producer, director and author Fritz Genschow was also the production manager.

== Cast ==
- Rita-Maria Nowotny as Aschenputtel / Cinderella
- Renée Stobrawa as Gute Fee / Fairy Godmother
- Änne Bruck as Stiefmutter / Stepmother
- Renate Fischer as Stiefschwester
- Fritz Genschow as Der Vater / Father
- Rüdiger Lichti as Der Prinz / Prince
- Werner Stock
- Herbert Weissbach
- Joachim Rödel
- Gisela Schauroth
- Erika Petrick
- Anni Marle
- Ali Wonka
- Regine Birkner
- Henning Schlüter
- Jugendchor der Hochschule für Musik as Jugendchor
- Maria Axt as Stiefschwester

== Bibliography ==
- Jack Zipes. The Enchanted Screen: The Unknown History of Fairy-Tale Films. Routledge, 2011.
