= List of films titled Hansel and Gretel =

Hansel and Gretel (or Hänsel und Gretel) is the title of the following films:

- Hansel and Gretel – an American dramatic short (d. J. Searle Dawley)
- Hansel and Gretel – an American comedy short (d. Alfred J. Goulding)
- Hansel and Gretel – an American animated short (d. Frank Moser)
- Hansel and Gretel – a 35-minute-long made-for-TV UK musical
- Hansel and Gretel – an American stop motion-animated short (d. Ray Harryhausen)
- Hansel and Gretel – an American animated short (d. Connie Rasinski)
- Hansel and Gretel a.k.a. Hänsel und Gretel, a German film directed by Walter Janssen
- Hansel and Gretel a.k.a. Hänsel und Gretel – a West German feature film; the American version was shortened from 87 to 38 minutes (d. Fritz Genschow)
- Hansel and Gretel (d. Paul Bogart) – not really a film, but an American made-for-TV live musical version of the story, starring Barbara Cook and Red Buttons, more than slightly overage, as the two children, Hans Conried in drag as the Witch, and Rise Stevens and Rudy Vallee as the parents. Songs by Alec Wilder. Has nothing to do with the Humperdinck opera. This TV special was made in the wake of the success of the first telecast of the Mary Martin Peter Pan.
- Hansel and Gretel: An Opera Fantasy – a 1954 American stop motion-animated musical feature based on the Hänsel und Gretel opera (d. Michael Myerberg, John Paul)
- Hansel and Gretel – a United Kingdom silhouette-animated short film (d. Lotte Reiniger)
- The Erotic Adventures of Hansel and Gretel a.k.a. Hänsel und Gretel verliefen sich im Wald – a 1970 West German film (released on video in the United States as "Hansel and Gretel")
- Hansel and Gretel – a 1976 East German animated short
- Hansel and Gretel – a Disney Channel special (d. Tim Burton)
- Hansel and Gretel – an Israeli/American film (d. Len Talan)
- Hansel and Gretel – an Australian made-for-TV musical film (d. Virginia Lumsden)
- Hansel and Gretel – a United States telecast of the Maurice Sendak production of Humperdinck's opera (d. Humphrey Burton)
- Hansel and Gretel – a direct-to-video film
- Hansel and Gretel – an American film (d. Gary J. Tunnicliffe)
- Hansel and Gretel – a Lithuanian film (d. Vytautas V. Landsbergis)
- de:Hänsel und Gretel (2006) - a Germany film
- Hansel and Gretel – a South Korean film
- Hansel and Gretel – a staged Humperdinck version originally created for the Welsh National Opera performed by the Metropolitan Opera for broadcast on PBS's Great Performances.
- de:Hänsel und Gretel (2012) - a Germany film
- Hansel and Gretel – American horror film
- Hansel & Gretel Get Baked - a 2013 comedy-horror film
- Hansel & Gretel: Warriors of Witchcraft – a 2013 action film
- Hansel and Gretel: Witch Hunters – a 2013 action-horror film with comedy elements
- Hansel and Gretel – a 2021 Russian animated film

== See also ==
- Hansel and Gretel (disambiguation)
