= Mother Holly =

1954 film

- Directed by: Fritz Genschow
- Written by: Fritz Genschow; Renée Stobrawa; Ursula Horwitz; Jacob Grimm (story); Wilhelm Grimm (story)
- Produced by: Fritz Genschow
- Starring: Renée Stobrawa; Rita-Maria Nowotny; Werner Stock
- Cinematography: Wolf Göthe; Gerhard Huttula
- Edited by: Anneliese Krigar
- Music by: Richard Stauch
- Production company: Fritz Genschow Films
- Distributed by: Hamburg-Film GmbH
- Release date: 5 December 1954
- Running time: 90 minutes
- Country: West Germany
- Language: German

Mother Holly or Mother Hulda (German: Frau Holle) is a 1954 West German family film directed by Fritz Genschow and starring Renée Stobrawa, Rita-Maria Nowotny and Werner Stock. It is based on the fairy tale Mother Hulda by the Brothers Grimm, part of a series of adaptations directed by Genschow. It was made using Agfacolor.

== Cast ==
- Renée Stobrawa as Frau Holle
- Rita-Maria Nowotny as Goldmarie
- Erika Petrick as Pechmarie
- Werner Stock as Schwarzer Peter
- Rudi Geske
- Melitta Klefer
- Anneliese Würtz
- Heidi Ewert
- Dagmar Kuckuck
- Gustav Bertram
- Eberhard Fechner
- Kurt Fleck
- Uwe Witt
- Hannes Huben
- Reiner Hengst
- Klaus Pfeifer

== Bibliography ==
- Jill Nelmes & Jule Selbo. Women Screenwriters: An International Guide. Palgrave Macmillan, 2015.
