= Little Red Riding Hood (1953 film) =

1953 film

- Directed by: Fritz Genschow
- Written by: Fritz Genschow; Renée Stobrawa; Jacob Grimm (story); Wilhelm Grimm (story)
- Produced by: Fritz Genschow
- Starring: Daniela Maris; Werner Stock; Rita-Maria Nowottnick
- Cinematography: Gerhard Huttula
- Edited by: Liselotte Cochius
- Music by: Richard Stauch
- Production company: Fritz Genschow Films
- Distributed by: West-Film-Vertrieb
- Release date: 25 October 1953
- Running time: 85 minutes
- Country: West Germany
- Language: German

Little Red Riding Hood (German: Rotkäppchen) is a 1953 West German family film directed by Fritz Genschow and starring Daniela Maris, Werner Stock and Rita-Maria Nowottnick. It is based on the fairy tale Little Red Riding Hood.

It should not be confused with another German adaptation, Little Red Riding Hood, directed by Walter Janssen, which was released the following year.

== Cast ==
- Daniela Maris as Heidi
- Werner Stock as Kesselflicker
- Rita-Maria Nowottnick as Elfe
- Else Ehser as Großmutter
- Renée Stobrawa as Mutter
- Fritz Genschow as Jäger
- Theodor Vogeler
- Max Grothusen
- Rüdiger Lichti
- Erika Petrick

== Bibliography ==
- Jill Nelmes & Jule Selbo. Women Screenwriters: An International Guide. Palgrave Macmillan, 2015.
