= The Goose Girl (1957 film) =

1957 film

- Directed by: Fritz Genschow
- Written by: Fritz Genschow; Renée Stobrawa; Ruth Hoffmann; Jacob Grimm (story); Wilhelm Grimm (story)
- Produced by: Fritz Genschow
- Starring: Rita-Maria Nowotny; Renée Stobrawa; Renate Fischer
- Cinematography: Gerhard Huttula
- Edited by: Erika Petrick
- Music by: Richard Stauch
- Production company: Fritz Genschow Films
- Release date: 1 December 1957
- Running time: 78 minutes
- Country: West Germany
- Language: German

The Goose Girl (German: Die Gänsemagd) is a 1957 West German family film directed by Fritz Genschow and starring Rita-Maria Nowotny, Renée Stobrawa and Renate Fischer. It is based on the fairy tale The Goose Girl by the Brothers Grimm.

== Cast ==
- Rita-Maria Nowotny as Prinzessin Rosemargret
- Renée Stobrawa as Königin-Mutter
- Renate Fischer as Malice - Kammermädchen
- Günter Hertel as Prinz Friedbert
- Alexander Welbat as Hinz - Reitbursche
- Wolfgang Draeger as Kunz - Reitbursche
- Fritz Genschow
- Theodor Vogeler
- Peter Hack

== Bibliography ==
- Jack Zipes. The Enchanted Screen: The Unknown History of Fairy-Tale Films. Routledge, 2011.
