= Sleeping Beauty (1955 film) =

1955 film

- Directed by: Fritz Genschow
- Written by: Fritz Genschow; Renée Stobrawa; Helga Weichart; Jacob Grimm (story); Wilhelm Grimm (story)
- Produced by: Fritz Genschow
- Starring: Angela von Leitner; Gert Reinholm; Karin Hardt
- Cinematography: Gerhard Huttula
- Edited by: Albert Baumeister
- Music by: Hans-Joachim Wunderlich
- Production company: Fritz Genschow Films
- Release date: 16 November 1955
- Running time: 82 minutes
- Country: West Germany
- Language: German

Sleeping Beauty (German: Dornröschen) is a 1955 West German family film directed by Fritz Genschow and starring Angela von Leitner, Gert Reinholm and Karin Hardt.

== Cast ==
- Angela von Leitner as Sleeping Beauty
- Gert Reinholm as Prince Charming
- Karin Hardt as The Queen
- Fritz Genschow as The King
- Ursula Becker
- Gustav Bertram
- Walter Bluhm
- Ingrid Cramer
- Klaus Gotthardt
- Waltraud Habicht
- Christiane Hase
- Erika Hermann
- Hannelore Herrndorf
- Irmgard Lehmann
- Ilse Maass
- Anni Marle
- Rudolf W. Marnitz
- Wulf Rittscher
- Sylvia Röber
- Gisela Schauroth
- Elfe Schneider
- Erika Stark
- Renée Stobrawa
- Rudi Stöhr
- Pia Trajun
- Paul Tripp as Narrator
- Theodor Vogeler
- Friedhelm von Schweinitz
- Wolfgang Zill

== Bibliography ==
- Jack Zipes. The Enchanted Screen: The Unknown History of Fairy-Tale Films. Routledge, 2011.
