= The Wishing-Table =

1956 film

- Directed by: Fritz Genschow
- Written by: Fritz Genschow; Renée Stobrawa; Jacob Grimm (story); Wilhelm Grimm (story)
- Produced by: Fritz Genschow
- Starring: Werner Stock; Wolfgang Draeger; Harald Dietl
- Cinematography: Gerhard Huttula
- Edited by: Albert Baumeister
- Music by: Richard Stauch
- Production company: Fritz Genschow Films
- Release date: 9 September 1956
- Running time: 79 minutes
- Country: West Germany
- Language: German

The Wishing-Table (German: Tischlein, deck dich) is a 1956 West German family film directed by Fritz Genschow and starring Werner Stock, Wolfgang Draeger and Harald Dietl. It is based on the story of the same name by the Brothers Grimm.

== Cast ==
- Werner Stock as Tailor
- Wolfgang Draeger as Peter
- Harald Dietl as Paul
- Horst Keitel as Hans
- Rita-Maria Nowotny as Kathy
- Wulf Rittscher as Innkeeper
- Fritz Genschow as Woodworker
- Sigrid Hackenberg as Marie
- Renée Stobrawa as Kathy's aunt
- Karola Ebeling as Liesel
- York Bertram as Charburner
- Otto Czarski as Robber
- Joachim Rödel as Robber
- Alexander Welbat as Robber
- Lutz Götz as Mayor
- Theodor Vogeler as Carpenter
- Nora Brand as Neighbor
- Otto Lengwinat as Miller
- Egon Stief as Servant

== Bibliography ==
- Jill Nelmes & Jule Selbo. Women Screenwriters: An International Guide. Palgrave Macmillan, 2015.
