= Hansel and Gretel (disambiguation) =

"Hansel and Gretel" is a fairy tale.

Hansel and Gretel may also refer to:

- Hansel and Gretel (opera), an 1893 opera by Engelbert Humperdinck
- Hänsel and Gretel (Black Lagoon), a pair of fictional characters in Black Lagoon
- Hänsel and Gretel, a pair of fictional characters in Evillious Chronicles

== Film ==
- Hansel and Gretel: An Opera Fantasy, a 1954 American stop-motion animated film
- Hansel and Gretel (1954 Janssen film), a German live-action film by Walter Janssen
- Hansel and Gretel (1954 Genschow film), a German film by Fritz Genschow
- Hansel and Gretel (1987 film), a part of Cannon Movie Tales starring Cloris Leachman
- Hansel and Gretel (1996 film), an Australian animated television film produced by Burbank Animation Studios
- Hansel and Gretel (2002 film), an American film starring Jacob Smith and Taylor Momsen
- Hansel and Gretel (2007 film), a South Korean horror film
- Hansel & Gretel: Witch Hunters, a 2013 American action-horror film with comedy elements
- Hansel & Gretel (2013 film), a direct-to-video film

== Television ==
- Hansel and Gretel (1958 TV special), an American live musical presentation
- "Hansel and Gretel" (Wednesday Theatre), a 1963 Australian adaptation of the opera Hansel and Gretel by Engelbert Humperdinck
- Hansel and Gretel (1983 TV special), a Disney television film by Tim Burton
- "Hansel and Gretel" (Faerie Tale Theatre), a 1983 episode of Faerie Tale Theatre

== See also ==
- Hamster & Gretel, a 2022 American animated superhero television series on Disney Channel
- Gretel & Hansel, a 2020 American horror film
- Hanzel und Gretyl, an American industrial metal band
- List of films titled Hansel and Gretel
