= Renate Wilson =

German actor and medical historian (1930–2008)

- Born: 20 April 1930; Berlin, Germany
- Died: 7 December 2008 (aged 78); Towson, Maryland, United States
- Occupations: Actress and historian of medicine

Renate Wilson (born Renate Fischer, 20 April 1930 – 7 December 2008) was a social and medical historian and former German film actress.

== Acting career ==
She appeared in seven films from 1949 to 1957.

=== Filmography ===
Year	Title	Role	Notes
1949	The Beaver Coat	Hausdame	
1950	Der Kahn der fröhlichen Leute	Käthe	
1950	The Merry Wives of Windsor	Frau des Baders	Uncredited
1951	Der Untertan	Guste Daimchen	
1953	Christina	Mädchen auf Dorffest	
1954	Der Froschkönig	Badefrau Marie	
1955	Cinderella	Stiefschwester	
1957	The Goose Girl	Malice – Kammermädchen	(final film role)

== Career in history ==
In the 1960s, Wilson moved to the United States. She was a Fulbright fellow at Johns Hopkins University and went on to obtain a PhD in history from the University of Maryland in 1988. She became known for her work on the influence of German emigrants on medicine and pharmacy in the United States.

== Death and legacy ==
Wilson died on 7 December 2008.
