= The Merry Vineyard (1952 film) =

1952 film

- Gustav Knuth (right) in a scene from the film
- Directed by: Erich Engel
- Written by: Carl Zuckmayer (play); Curt J. Braun
- Produced by: Karl Julius Fritzsche
- Starring: Gustav Knuth; Camilla Spira; Wilfried Seyferth
- Cinematography: Hans Schneeberger
- Edited by: Martha Dübber
- Music by: Willy Schmidt-Gentner
- Production company: Magna Film
- Distributed by: Deutsche London-Film
- Release date: 25 November 1952
- Running time: 95 minutes
- Country: West Germany
- Language: German

The Merry Vineyard (German: Der fröhliche Weinberg) is a 1952 West German comedy film directed by Erich Engel and starring Gustav Knuth, Camilla Spira and Wilfried Seyferth. It is based on a play by Carl Zuckmayer which had previously been made into a silent film in 1927, of which this film is a remake. It was made at the Tempelhof Studios in West Berlin. The film's sets were designed by the art director Franz Schroedter. It is sometimes known by the alternative title of The Grapes Are Ripe.

== Cast ==
- Gustav Knuth as Jean Baptiste
- Camilla Spira as Annemarie
- Wilfried Seyferth as Gustav Knuzius
- Eva Ingeborg Scholz as Klärchen Gunderloch
- Lutz Moik as Jochen Most
- Willy Reichert as Eismayer
- Käte Pontow as Babettchen Eismayer
- Paul Henckels as Paul Rindsfuss
- Lotte Rausch as Frau Rindsfuss
- Paul Heidemann as Stenz
- Lis Verhoeven as Fräulein Stenz
- Ludwig Schmitz as Jockel
- Werner Stock as Dr. Bruchmüller
- Karl Luley as Raunz
- Paul Schwed as Stoppski
- Kurt Rackelmann as Schorsch
- Alfred Rasser as Herr Zigerli
- Rudolf Walter as Herr Hössli
- Willy Millowitsch as Vogelsberger
- Herbert Kroll as Dr. Broda
- Wolfried Lier as Auto-Vertreter
- Alfred Menhardt as Kurrle
- Jupp Flohr as Kellner
- Karl Bischof as Briefträger
- Lucie Euler as Wirtin
- Reinhard Kolldehoff as Küfer
- Friedrich Maurer as Dr. Unkelhäuser
- Alfred Schieske as Dr. Unkelhäuse

== Reception ==
"It is an "ensemble play". And ensembles are Erich Engel's strength, and he has staged [that film] with a captivating style. The actors are guided with love and sensitivity.", wrote Ernst Erich Stassi in Der neue Film in December 1952

== Bibliography ==
- Goble, Alan. The Complete Index to Literary Sources in Film. Walter de Gruyter, 1999.
