= The Beaver Coat (1949 film) =

1949 film directed by Erich Engel

- German film poster
- German: Der Biberpelz
- Directed by: Erich Engel
- Written by: Robert A. Stemmle
- Based on: The Beaver Coat by Gerhart Hauptmann
- Produced by: Herbert Uhlich
- Starring: Fita Benkhoff; Werner Hinz; Käthe Haack
- Cinematography: Bruno Mondi
- Edited by: Lilian Seng
- Music by: Ernst Roters
- Production company: DEFA
- Distributed by: Progress Film
- Release date: 21 October 1949
- Running time: 97 minutes
- Country: East Germany
- Language: German

The Beaver Coat (German: Der Biberpelz) is a 1949 East German comedy film directed by Erich Engel and starring Fita Benkhoff, Werner Hinz and Käthe Haack. It is an adaptation of Gerhart Hauptmann's 1893 play The Beaver Coat, previously adapted into a 1928 silent film and a 1937 sound film produced during the Nazi era.

It was made at the Johannisthal Studios in Berlin and on the backlot of Babelsberg Studios, both of which fell into the Eastern Zone of occupation in 1945 and were under the control of the state-owned DEFA organisation. Location shooting also took place in Potsdam. The film's sets were designed by the art director Otto Erdmann.

== Cast ==
- Fita Benkhoff as Auguste Wolff
- Werner Hinz as Friedrich von Wehrhahn
- Käthe Haack as Regina von Wehrhahn
- Friedrich Gnaß as Julius Wolff
- Ingrid Rentsch as Leontine Wolff
- Edith Hancke as Adelheid Wolff
- Paul Bildt as Wilhelm Krüger
- Berta Monnard as Adele Krüger
- Erwin Geschonneck as Motes
- Emmy Burg as Frau Motes
- Herbert Wilk as Dr. Joachim Fleischer
- Alfred Schieske as Wulkow
- Ilse Trautschold as Frau Wulkow
- Werner Peters as Eberhard Schulz
- Franz Weber as Mitteldorf
- Hans Ulrich as Glasenapp
- Elfie Dugall as Alma
- Walter Bechmann
- Gisela Breiderhoff
- Gerd Ewert
- Renate Fischer
- Anni Haupt
- Friedrich Honna
- Hedwig Kohlhoff
- Alois Krüger
- Otto Lange
- Wladimir Marfiak
- Hermann Schechert
- Christine Traute-Wiere
- Erik von Loewis

== See also ==
- The Beaver Coat (1928 film)
- The Beaver Coat (1937 film)
