= The Beaver Coat (1937 film) =

1937 film

- German film poster
- German: Der Biberpelz
- Directed by: Jürgen von Alten
- Written by: Georg C. Klaren
- Based on: The Beaver Coat by Gerhart Hauptmann
- Produced by: Hans von Wolzogen
- Starring: Heinrich George; Ida Wüst; Rotraut Richter
- Cinematography: Georg Krause
- Edited by: Erich Palme
- Music by: Leo Leux
- Production company: Fabrikation Deutscher Filme
- Distributed by: Panorama-Film
- Release date: 3 December 1937
- Running time: 98 minutes
- Country: Germany
- Language: German

The Beaver Coat (German: Der Biberpelz) is a 1937 German comedy film directed by Jürgen von Alten and starring Heinrich George, Ida Wüst, and Rotraut Richter. It is an adaptation of Gerhart Hauptmann's play The Beaver Coat. The German premiere took place on 3 December 1937. Another film version of the play The Beaver Coat was released in 1949.

== Cast ==
- Heinrich George as Amtsvorsteher Baron von Wehrhahn
- Ida Wüst as Auguste Wolff
- Rotraut Richter as Adelheid Wolff
- Sabine Peters as Leontine Wolff
- Heinz von Cleve as Konstrukteur Dr. Fleischer
- Ernst Waldow as Forstadjtant a.D. Motes
- Ewald Wenck as Julius Wolff
- Eduard Wenck as Rentier Krüger
- Blandine Ebinger as Mrs. Krüger
- Albert Florath as Agust Wulkow, skipper
- Renée Stobrawa as Almine Wulkow
- Fritz Odemar as Prince August Sigismund
- Arthur Schröder as Theerbrügge's adjutant
- Walter Bluhm as Schreiber Glasenapp
- Carl Heinz Charrell as Amtsdiener Mitteldorf
- Hilde Seipp as singer
- S. O. Schoening as table neighbor of the office head
- Walter Werner as office head
- Günther Vogdt as Heines, hunting assistant
- Walter Bechmann as Herr von den Daimler-Werken
- Ernst Stimmel as general manager
- Oskar Höcker as policeman
- Charles Willy Kayser as Fürsten's second adjutant
- Gustav Mahncke as concierge
- Anita Düwell as Mr. Motes' lady
- Gerti Kammerzell as Dame mit Herrn Motes
- Jac Diehl as waiter at 'Ochsen'
- Dorothea Thiess as Hebamme
- Willi Sande-Meyer as attendee of the inauguration of the Baron von Wehrhahn
- Renée Carstennsen as Elschen Krüger
- Wolfgang Dohnberg as Herr von den Daimler-Werken

== See also ==
- The Beaver Coat (1928 film)
- The Beaver Coat (1949 film)
