= Miracle of Flight (1935 film) =

1935 film

- Directed by: Heinz Paul
- Written by: Peter Francke; Heinz Paul; Hans Rameau
- Produced by: Willy Clever; Conny Carstennsen; Willy Laschinsky
- Starring: Ernst Udet; Jürgen Ohlsen; Käthe Haack
- Cinematography: Hans Schneeberger; Heinz von Jaworsky; Franz Weihmayr
- Edited by: Paul May
- Music by: Giuseppe Becce
- Production company: Terra Film
- Distributed by: Terra Film
- Release date: 14 May 1935
- Running time: 79 minutes
- Country: Germany
- Language: German

Miracle of Flight (German: Wunder des Fliegens) is a 1935 German drama film directed by Heinz Paul and starring Ernst Udet, Jürgen Ohlsen and Käthe Haack. The film's sets were designed by the art director Robert A. Dietrich. It was in the tradition of mountain films and was backed by the Ministry of Aviation whose chief Hermann Göring briefly appears in the film. Jürgen Ohlsen, who plays the aspiring aviator in the film, had previously starred in another Nazi propaganda film Hitler Youth Quex in 1933.

== Synopsis ==
A boy whose aviator father was killed in the First World War, idolises the fighter pilot Ernst Udet. His ambitions to become a pilot himself are opposed by his mother because of the loss of her husband. While on a training flight the boy is stranded on a mountainside and a rescue mission is flown by Udet to rescue him. His mother's objections to his future career are eventually overcome.

== Cast ==
- Ernst Udet as Flieger Udet
- Jürgen Ohlsen as Heinz Muthesius
- Käthe Haack as Mutter Muthesius
- Hermann Göring as Cameo
- Cornelius Booth
- Leonie Duval
- Elfriede Sandner

== Bibliography ==
- Hales, Barbara, Petrescu, Mihaela and Weinstein, Valerie. Continuity and Crisis in German Cinema, 1928-1936. Boydell & Brewer, 2016.
- Klaus, Ulrich J. Deutsche Tonfilme: Jahrgang 1935. Klaus-Archiv, 1988.
- Waldman, Harry. Nazi Films in America, 1933-1942. McFarland, 2008.
