= Der Hitlerjunge Quex =

1932 Nazi propaganda novel

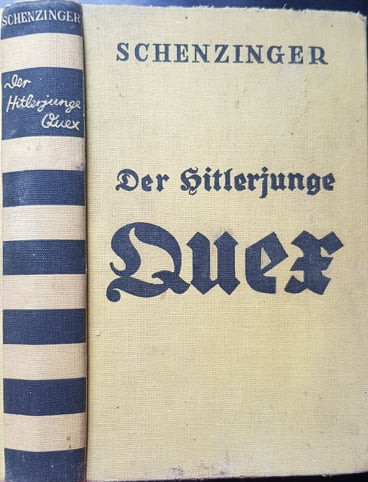
- Cover of the first edition.
- Author: Karl Aloys Schenzinger
- Language: German
- Genre: Novel
- Published: 1932
- Publisher: "Zeitgeschichte” Verlag
- Publication place: Germany
- Media type: Print
- Pages: 264

Der Hitlerjunge Quex is a 1932 Nazi propaganda novel by Karl Aloys Schenzinger based on the life of Herbert “Quex” Norkus. The 1933 film Hitlerjunge Quex: Ein Film vom Opfergeist der deutschen Jugend was based on it and was described by Joseph Goebbels as the "first large-scale" transmission of Nazi ideology using the medium of cinema. Both the book and the film, like S.A.-Mann Brand and Hans Westmar, which were released the same year, fictionalised and glorified death in the service of the Nazi Party and Adolf Hitler.

== Background ==
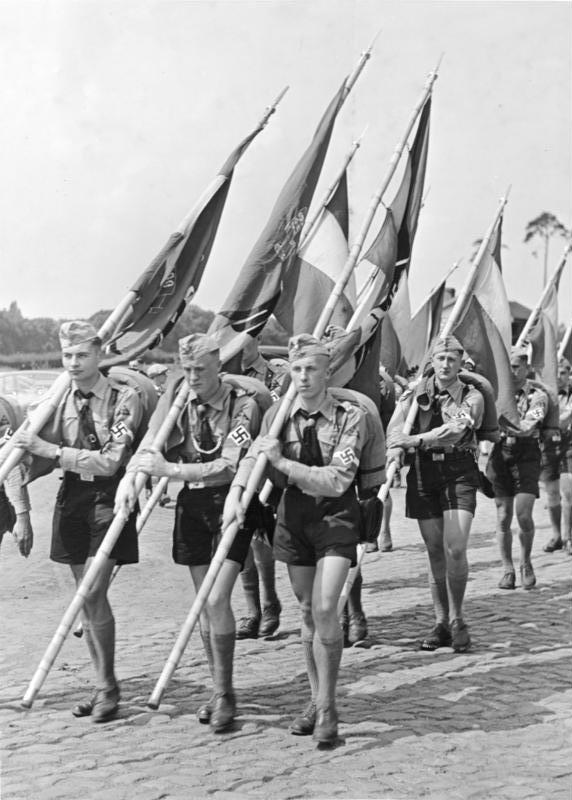
Hitler Youths marching from Herbert Norkus' grave to the Nazi party convent in Nuremberg

Both the novel and film are based on the real story of Herbert Norkus' life. Norkus, a Hitler Youth member, had died from injuries suffered while being chased and confronted by Communist youths in the night of 23/24 January 1932 in the Beusselkietz neighbourhood of Moabit, Berlin. Already on the next morning, Joseph Goebbels began to use Norkus' death for propaganda purposes during a rally in Berlin's Sportpalast. The funeral on 29 January at Plötzensee, Berlin, was turned into a major ceremony of several Nazi party organizations, under the aegis of Goebbels. While the murder was condemned also by non-Nazi press, the Communists started a counter-propaganda offensive, describing the incident as an accidental result of Communist self-defence during a Nazi attack. In the subsequent trial, several people were sentenced by the Landgericht I court in Moabit, yet the most prominent accomplices Willi Simon, Bernhard Klingbeil and Harry Tack had been able to escape to the Soviet Union.

After the Nazis assumed power, the grave of Norkus was turned into a Nazi shrine which was visited annually on New Year's Day by Nazi youth leader Baldur von Schirach for a speech that was broadcast nationwide. To the site of Norkus' death at Zwinglistraße 4, a plaque was attached reading "He Gave His Life For Germany's Freedom", the first of several such memorial plaques subsequently placed throughout Germany. 24 January was made remembrance day for all killed Hitler Youths, and the flag of Norkus' unit became the Hitler Youth's "blood flag". Two weeks after the Enabling Act of 1933, a provocative Hitler Youth march to Norkus' grave took the route through Berlin's communist districts of Wedding and Moabit. Throughout Germany, the Nazis organized demonstrations and speeches commemorating their newly created martyr. Novels, plays, poems and songs were written about him.

== The novel ==
The novel Der Hitlerjunge Quex was written by Karl Aloys Schenzinger between May and September 1932. It was first published in the Nazi Party newspaper Völkischer Beobachter and as a book in December 1932. A required reading for Hitler Youth members, it had more than 190,000 copies sold within two years and more than 500,000 copies by 1945.

In Schenzinger's novel, Herbert Norkus is named Heini Völker. With a völkisch undertone, the opening chapters describe the hardships of Norkus' youth in a working-class district of Berlin, characterised by the Great Depression, the unemployment of his father and the suicide of his mother. The contemporary communist youth (Rote Jungfront, "Red Young Front") is portrayed as a disorderly gang devoted primarily to alcohol, tobacco and sex. In contrast, the Nazi youth (Hitlerjugend, "Hitler Youth") is portrayed as an orderly organisation, superior in morals. Schenzinger lets Heini Völker's father force his son to attend a camping weekend organised by a communist youth group, North Star Moabit. Heini is disgusted and flees the camp, only to encounter a Hitler Youth group in the woods. Deeply impressed and in an atmosphere of nationalistic pathos, Heini learns of the Nazi movement, Führerprinzip ("leader principle"), comradeship and Volksgemeinschaft ("the people's community"). On "the happiest day of his life", Heini joins the Hitler Youth, and Schenzinger has the Bannführer (group leader) symbolise Nazi ideology when he hands over Heini's uniform to him: "[The uniform] is the clothing of the community, of comradeship, of our ideology, of our unified organisation! [...] It makes us all equal, and gives the same to all and demands the same from all. He who wears such a uniform does not have desires of his own anymore, he has only to obey."

The following chapters deal with Heini's life as a Hitler Youth. Obedience and equality, as understood by the Nazis, are portrayed in a very positive light. They turn out to be beneficial not only for Heini but also for his comrades such as his friend Fritz Dörries, the son of a lawyer. Emphasis is put on the vision of self-sacrifice, the abolition of social barriers, and establishing racial purity, and Heini learns from Fritz that "with us Hitler Youth, there are no classes. There are only those who get the job done and parasites, and those we'll throw out." The haven that Heini found in the Hitler Youth is symbolised by his group's hang-out, "Castle Beusselkietz"; Norkus' group was Schar 2, Hitlerjugend Beusselkietz-Hansa. His comrades nicknamed him Quex because "he carried out orders faster than quicksilver" (German: Quecksilber).

The last part of the novel is devoted to the circumstances of Heini Volker's (or Norkus's) death. According to Baird (1992), Schenzinger's version is a "thinly veiled parallel to Resurrection": When his comrades were gathered around his deathbed and wonder whether he is still alive, there "suddenly [...] is a scream. Heini is sitting up in bed, his eyes wide open. He is singing. They don't recognise the words, but they know the melody. It's the song they sing every day, every evening together, on every march. Everyone knows what it means - death is singing here."

== Film ==
Hitler Youth Quex (Ufa film)

Staff
Producer	Karl Ritter
Director	Hans Steinhoff
Script	Bobby E. Lüthge; Karl Aloys Schenzinger
Cinematography	Konstantin Irmen-Tschet
Ass. Camera	Fred Fernau; Erich Rudolf Schmidke
Publicity Photography	Otto Schulz
Editing	Milo Habich
Set Design	Benno von Arent; Arthur Günther
Make-up	Waldemar Jabs
Clothing	Berta Grützmacher; Paul Haupt
Sound	Walter Tjaden; Erich Leistner
Music	Hans-Otto Borgmann; Baldur von Schirach

Cast
Heini Völker	Jürgen Ohlsen
Father Völker	Heinrich George
Mother Völker	Berta Drews
Brigade leader Cass	Claus Clausen
Fritz Dörris	a Hitler Youth
Gerda	Rotraut Richter
Stoppel	Hermann Speelmans
Franz	Hans Richter
Grundler	a Hitler Youth
Kowalski	Ernst Behmer
Doctor	Hans Joachim Büttner
Nurse	Franziska Kinz
Carnival singer	Rudolf Platte
Barker	Reinhold Bernt
Furniture dealer	Hans Deppe
Neighbor	Anna Müller-Lincke
Wilde	Karl Meixner
Grocer	Karl Hannemann
Desk sergeant	Ernst Rotmund
Bartender	Hans Otto Stern
Further	Herrmann Braun; Heinz Trumper; Hitler Youth units

The novel provided the basis for a subsequent film version, produced in the Universum Film AG (Ufa) studios. The plot was written by Bobby E. Lüthge and Karl Aloys Schenzinger, the author of the novel. Produced by Karl Ritter, the film was supported by the Nazi leadership and produced for 320,000 ℛ︁ℳ︁ under the aegis of Baldur von Schirach. The latter also wrote the lyrics for the Hitler Youth song "Unsere Fahne flattert uns voran", based on an existing melody by Hans-Otto Borgmann, who was also responsible for the music. The director was Hans Steinhoff. For the film, the novel's title was amended with the subtitle Ein Film vom Opfergeist der deutschen Jugend ("A film about the sacrificial spirit of German youth"). The film has a length of 95 minutes (2,605 metres) and was premiered on 11 September 1933 at the Ufa-Phoebus Palace, Munich, and on 19 September at the Ufa-Palast am Zoo, Berlin. It was one of three films about Nazi martyrs in 1933, the other two being SA-Mann Brand and Hans Westmar, and by January 1934, it had been viewed by a million people.

The film's message is characterised by its final words' "The flag means more than death".

== Sources ==
=== Bibliography ===
- Baird, Jay W. (1992). To Die for Germany. Heroes in the Nazi Pantheon. Indiana University Press. ISBN 0-253-20757-6.
- Koonz, Claudia (2003). The Nazi conscience. Harvard University Press. ISBN 0-674-01172-4.
- Leiser, Erwin (1974). Nazi Cinema. Macmillan. ISBN 0-02-570230-0.
- Rentschler, Eric (1996). The ministry of illusion. Nazi cinema and its afterlife. Harvard University Press. ISBN 0-674-57640-3.
- Gillespie, William (2022). Hitler Youth Quex : a guide for the English-speaking reader. Potts Point, NSW Australia. ISBN 978-0-9808612-7-3. OCLC 1373845164.
