= Hansel and Gretel (1954 Genschow film) =

1954 film

- Directed by: Fritz Genschow
- Written by: Fritz Genschow; Renée Stobrawa; Jacob Grimm (story); Wilhelm Grimm (story)
- Produced by: F.J. Gottleib
- Cinematography: Gerhard Huttula
- Edited by: Annemarie Rokoss
- Music by: Richard Stauch
- Production company: Fritz Genschow Films
- Release date: 27 August 1954
- Running time: 38 minutes
- Country: West Germany
- Language: German

Hansel and Gretel (German: Hänsel und Gretel) is a 1954 West German family film directed by Fritz Genschow. It is based on the fairy tale Hansel and Gretel by the Brothers Grimm. It should not be confused with the German film Hansel and Gretel, nor the American film Hansel and Gretel, both of which were released the same year.

It was shot at the Tempelhof Studios in Berlin and on location in Lower Saxony.

== Cast ==
- Wolfgang Condrus
- Heidi Ewert as Gretel
- Fritz Genschow
- Elisabeth Ilna as Witch
- Erika Kruse as Lene
- Rita-Maria Nowotny
- Erika Petrick as Mother
- Wulf Rittscher as Kaufmann Klos
- August Spillner as Father
- Renée Stobrawa as Frau Köper
- Werner Stock as Michael
- Peter-Uwe Witt as Hänsel

== See also ==
- List of films about witchcraft

== Bibliography ==
- Jill Nelmes & Jule Selbo. Women Screenwriters: An International Guide. Palgrave Macmillan, 2015.
