= The Beaver Coat (1928 film) =

1928 film directed by Erich Schönfelder

- German: Der Biberpelz
- Directed by: Erich Schönfelder
- Written by: Fanny Carlsen; Willy Haas
- Based on: The Beaver Coat by Gerhart Hauptmann
- Starring: Ralph Arthur Roberts; Lucie Höflich; Wolfgang von Schwindt
- Cinematography: Friedrich Weinmann
- Music by: Pasquale Perris
- Production company: Deutsche Film Union
- Distributed by: Deutsche First National Pictures
- Release date: 9 March 1928
- Country: Germany
- Languages: Silent; German intertitles

The Beaver Coat (German: Der Biberpelz) is a 1928 German silent comedy film directed by Erich Schönfelder and starring Ralph Arthur Roberts, Lucie Höflich and Wolfgang von Schwindt. It is based on Gerhart Hauptmann's play The Beaver Coat. It was made by the German subsidiary of First National Pictures. It was shot at the Staaken Studios in Berlin. The film's art direction was by Bruno Lutz and Franz Seemann.

== Cast ==
- Ralph Arthur Roberts as Wehrhahn
- Lucie Höflich as Mrs. Wolff
- Wolfgang von Schwindt as Julian Wolff
- La Jana as Leontine
- Ilse Stobrawa as Adelheid
- Rudolf Biebrach as Rentier Krüger
- Josefine Dora as Krüger's wife
- Paul Henckels as Mothes
- Camilla von Hollay as Mothes's wife
- Max Maximilian as Wulkow
- Walter Formes as Dr. Fleischer
- Heinrich Gotho as Mittendorf
- Ernst Behmer as Glasenapp
- Harry Gondi as Gustav, Leontine's fiancé
- Ernst Pittschau

== See also ==
- The Beaver Coat (1937 film)
- The Beaver Coat (1949 film)
