= Herbert Norkus =

Hitler Youth member killed by Communists

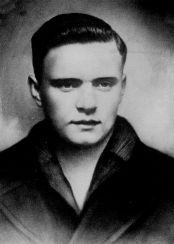
Herbert Norkus

Herbert Norkus (26 July 1916 – 24 January 1932) was a Hitler Youth member who was murdered by German Communists. He became a role model and martyr for the Hitler Youth and was widely used in Nazi propaganda, most prominently as the subject of novel and film Hitler Youth Quex.

== Background ==
Born to a working class family in the Tiergarten district of Berlin, Norkus joined the Naval Hitler Youth in 1931. He was reported to have enjoyed playing the piano and drawing. His father had been wounded in World War I, and supposedly had Communist sympathies. The official Nazi biographies of Norkus claimed his father initially opposed his son's Nazi activities but was ultimately converted and became a Nazi too.

Clashes between the Hitler Youth and the Communist Red Front youth movement (Rote Jungfront) were becoming increasingly common as the NSDAP and the German Communist Party struggled for power in the waning days of the Weimar Republic.

His comrades nicknamed him “Quex” because ”he carried out orders faster than quicksilver” (German: Quecksilber).

== Death ==
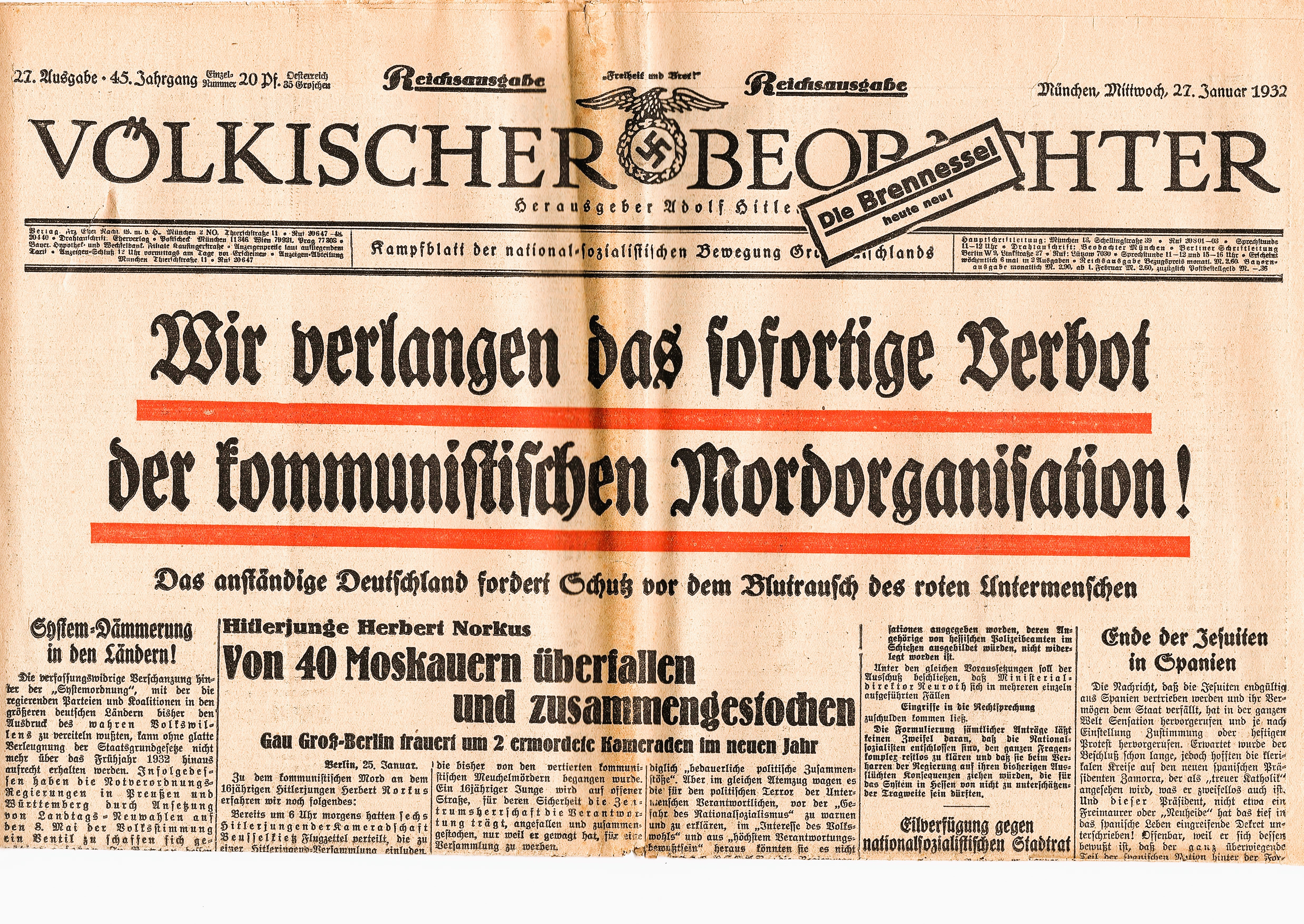
The NSDAP party organ Völkischer Beobachter reporting three days after the murder: We demand the immediate ban of the communist murder organization! The decent Germany demands protection against the blood frenzy of the red subhumans

On 24 January 1932, 15-year-old Herbert Norkus and other Hitler Youth members were distributing leaflets advertising a forthcoming Nazi rally. The group was confronted by Communists. Norkus fought them off and ran to a nearby house for help. A man answered and slammed the door in his face. Norkus was then stabbed six times by the pursuing Communists. He banged on another door, which was answered by a woman who tried to get him to a hospital. However, he died on arrival.

== "Hitlerjunge Quex" ==
Writer Karl Aloys Schenzinger made Norkus into a role model for the Hitler Youth in a popular Nazi novel, Der Hitlerjunge Quex (1932). The novel was required reading for all members of the Hitler Youth. In 1933, it was made into a film directed by Hans Steinhoff, with Hitler Youth member Jürgen Ohlsen in the lead role and Heinrich George in a major role as the boy's father.

== Honors ==
Passau named a street after Norkus.

A German Navy school ship called the Herbert Norkus was named in his honor, but it was never completed because of the war. Many schools, streets and squares were also named after him during the Nazi period.

== See also ==
Others given posthumous fame by the Nazis

- Wilhelm Gustloff
- Horst Wessel
- List of Nazis who died in the Beer Hall Putsch
