= Triplets on Board =

1959 film

- Directed by: Hans Müller
- Written by: Gustav Kampendonk; Lothar Koch
- Produced by: Otto Meissner
- Starring: Heinz Erhardt; Ann Smyrner; Ingrid van Bergen
- Cinematography: Erich Claunigk
- Edited by: Martha Dübber
- Music by: Heino Gaze
- Production company: Deutsche Film Hansa
- Distributed by: Deutsche Film Hansa
- Release date: 22 December 1959
- Running time: 82 minutes
- Country: West Germany
- Language: German

Triplets on Board (German: Drillinge an Bord) is a 1959 West German comedy film directed by Hans Müller and starring Heinz Erhardt, Ann Smyrner and Ingrid van Bergen.

The film's sets were designed by the art director Walter Haag.

== Synopsis ==
Three identical brothers all go on the same cruise using only one ticket.

== Cast ==
- Heinz Erhardt as Eduard Bollmann / Otto Bollmann / Heinz Bollmann
- Ann Smyrner as Rita
- Ingrid van Bergen as Diana
- Peter Carsten as Fred Larsen
- Trude Herr as Lady Zocker
- Günter Pfitzmann as Mac
- Paul Westermeier as Kapitän
- Billy Mo as Bobo
- Ralf Wolter as Friseur
- Günther Jerschke as Reinwald - Fernsehreporter
- Paul Dahlke as Emilio
- Kathrin Ackermann as Showmaster
- Max Giese
- Klaus Hellmold
- Horst Koblenzer
- Paul Kuhn as himself / Singer
- Günther Ungeheuer as Kellner

== Bibliography ==
- Hake, Sabine. German National Cinema. Routledge, 2013.
