= 1-2-3 Corona =

1948 film

- Directed by: Hans Müller
- Written by: Artur A. Kuhnert
- Produced by: Eduard Kubat
- Starring: Eva Ingeborg Scholz
- Cinematography: Robert Baberske
- Edited by: Ilse Voigt
- Music by: Hans-Otto Borgmann
- Production company: DEFA
- Distributed by: Progress Film
- Release date: 17 September 1948
- Running time: 86 minutes
- Country: Soviet occupation zone of Germany
- Language: German

1-2-3 Corona is an East German film directed by Hans Müller. It was released in 1948.

== Plot ==
In ruined Berlin, several bands of abandoned children roam the streets, engaging in petty crimes. When a circus arrives nearby, the boys are charmed by one trapeze performer called Corona. They are upset when the circus' manager insults her, and plan revenge by setting a trap on the ring. But their scheme fails and it is Corona that is injured. Being unable to work, she is dismissed. The boys tend to her, and as time passes, she teaches them her art, and they form a little circus of their own. A manager of another circus offers Corona a job. She is reluctant to leave the children. Eventually, the manager takes them all into his circus.

== Cast ==
- Eva Ingeborg Scholz as Corona
- Lutz Moik as Gerhard Wittmann
- Piet Clausen as Dietrich
- Ralph Siewert as Fritzchen
- Walter Werner as Doctor Waldner
- Annemarie Hase as Frau Schmittchen
- Herbert Hübner as Professor Hanke
- Hans-Edgar Stecher as Heinz
- Horst Gentzen as Emil
- Werner Müller as Carl
- Hans Neie as Rudi
- Eduard Wandrey as Hugo Grandini
- Hans Leibelt as Circus Manager Barlay

== Production ==
The scriptwriters were inspired by a real children's circus, Rose, that was a popular attraction in the city of Pößneck during the first post-war years. 1-2-3 Corona was the first DEFA picture to be filmed in UFA's old studio in Potsdam-Babelsberg, which was turned into the DEFA Feature Films Studio. Outdoor photography took place in Charlottenburg and Prenzlauer Berg.

== Reception ==
1-2-3 Corona had its premiere in East Berlin's Babylon Cinema. It was viewed by some eight million people. The Catholic Film Service defined it as a "realistic picture, managing to create an entertaining film with modest resources."

Author Peter Pleyer regarded it as a classical "Rubble film", that "tried to provide some optimism".
