= Herbert Stass =

- Born: Herbert Franz Martin Stass; 7 October 1919; Oebisfelde; Germany
- Died: November 11, 1999 (aged 80); Berlin; Germany
- Occupations: Film actor Television actor
- Years active: 1950–1999

Herbert Franz Martin Stass (7 October 1919 – 11 November 1999) was a German film and television actor.

== Filmography ==
Year	Title	Role	Notes
1947	And the Heavens Above Us	Young Man	Uncredited
1950	The Staircase	Willy Weide	
1955	The Plot to Assassinate Hitler	Willy - junger Arbeiter	
1958	Escape from Sahara		
1960	Marina	Ralf Moebius	Voice, Uncredited
1961	The Miracle of Father Malachia	Arbeiter #2	
1962	Treasure of Silver Lake	Winnetou	Voice, Uncredited
1963	The Invisible Terror	Janke	
1966	Kommissar X – In den Klauen des goldenen Drachen	Charly	Voice, Uncredited
1966	The Quiller Memorandum	Kenneth Lindsay Jones	Uncredited
1968	Death in the Red Jaguar	Sam Parker	
1970	Like a Tear in the Ocean	Herbert Soennecke	TV miniseries
1970	Eine große Familie	Josef Vierthaler	TV film
1971	Interview mit Herbert K.	Herbert K.	Grimme-Preis
1972	Viola and Sebastian	Kellner	
1980	Musik auf dem Lande		
1984	Beautiful Wilhelmine	Friedrich II.	3 episodes
1985	Más vampiros en La Habana	Hauptmann	German version, Voice

=== Dubbing ===
- No Love for Johnnie (1961) – Drake
