= Bürgermeister Anna =

1950 film

- Directed by: Hans Müller
- Written by: Friedrich Wolf
- Starring: Eva Rimski
- Cinematography: Robert Baberske
- Release date: 24 March 1950
- Running time: 88 minutes
- Country: East Germany
- Language: German

Bürgermeister Anna is an East German comedy film directed by Hans Müller. It was released in 1950.

== Cast ==
- Eva Rimski as Anna Drews
- Reinhard Kolldehoff as Jupp Ucker
- Catja Görna as Ursel Ucker
- Klaus Becker as Hans Rapp
- Arno Paulsen as Bauer Lehmkuhl
- Lutz Moik as Matthias Lehmkuhl
- Arthur Wiesner as Vater Ucker
- Steffie Spira as Mutter Ucker
- Charlotte Ritter as Mutter Drews
- Gustav Püttjer as Ohm Willem
- Erich Dunskus as Bauer Rau
- Edith Hancke as Grete Drews
- Sigrid Lagemann as Elli Rapp
