= Ellen Frank (actress) =

German actress (1904–1999)

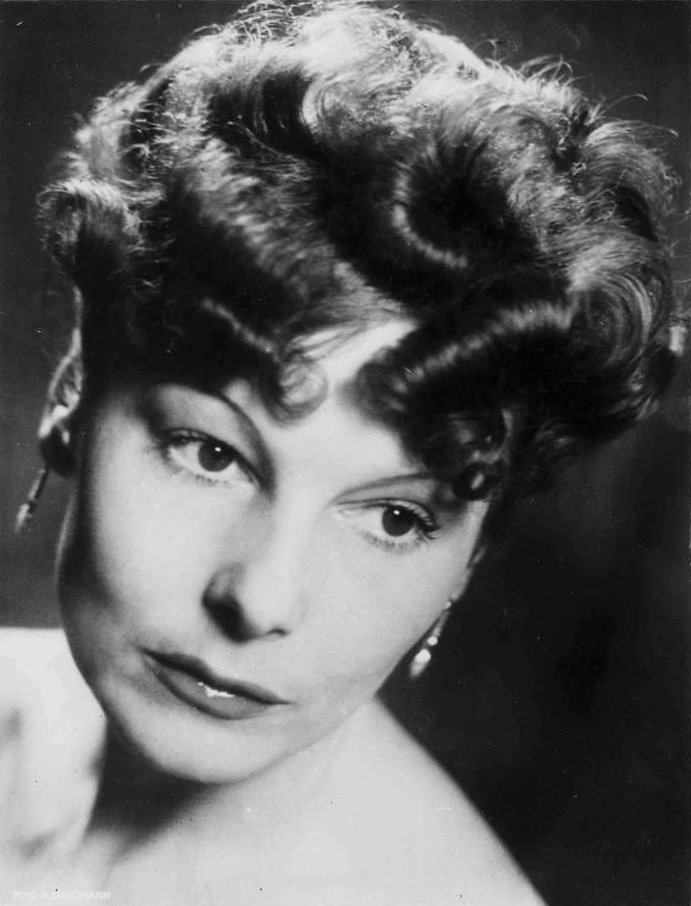
- Ellen Frank in 1938
- Born: 9 March 1904; Aurich, German Empire
- Died: 17 September 1999 (aged 95); Klagenfurt, Austria
- Occupation: Actress
- Years active: 1930-1992 (film)

Ellen Frank (1904–1999) was a German film and television actress.

== Early life ==
Frank was the daughter of a Prussian government councilor, Georg Frank, and his wife Paula (née Heckmann). She grew up in Cologne, and, from 1911, in Hanover, where she attended a secondary school for girls. She received training at a commercial school and at an engineering firm. She then worked as a secretary at a concert agency. She lost her father in 1921 and her mother in 1922.

== Career ==
Frank took dance lessons and appeared as a dancer at the Hanover City Theater. In 1924 she danced at the Dreistädtebundtheater Hamborn/Gladbeck/Oberhausen, then in Duisburg. She received acting lessons at Erwin Piscator's acting school and made her debut as Amalia in Die Räuber at the Volksbühne Berlin. She played in various theaters in Berlin, including the cabaret Die Katakombe, and occasionally in Würzburg and Dresden and was very active as a singer and cabaret artist.

From 1933 onwards, Frank starred in German films. In several productions, including repeatedly with Heinz Rühmann, she embodied self-confident young women. After her marriage in 1939, she withdrew from the public eye for a long time. In the 1950s, Frank was seen again in a few films. In 1954 she appeared in two Schongerfilm fairy tale productions. In Little Red Riding Hood she played the grandmother and in Hansel and Gretel she was the mother.

From 1956 to 1958 she was engaged at the Munich Theater on Brienner Straße, and from 1959 to 1963 at the Staatstheater Berlin. In addition to several tours and guest appearances, she played at the Munich Kammerspiele from 1985 to 1988 and again from 1990 to 1993.

Her work on television ultimately became very important. She appeared in several series and was part of the regular cast of Matt in 13 Trains and Two Münchner in Hamburg.

== Personal life ==
In early 30's she was dating artist Laszlo Moholy-Nagy, living with him in Berlin. In 1931 they visited Finland, meeting Moholy-Nagy's friend, architect Alvar Aalto. In 1939, Frank married Georg Arm, who worked in the construction industry. Their daughter, Evelyne, became a costume designer and married the set designer Matthias Kralj. Her marriage to Arm later ended in divorce.

Her sister, Ilse, married Walter Gropius.

== Selected filmography ==
- The Rakoczi March (1933)
- Such a Rascal (1934)
- Peer Gynt (1934)
- A Night of Change (1935)
- The Girl from the Marsh Croft (1935)
- The Blonde Carmen (1935)
- The Old and the Young King (1935)
- The Merry Wives (1936)
- Family Parade (1936)
- Under Blazing Heavens (1936)
- Gold in New Frisco (1939)
- Little Red Riding Hood (1954)
- Hansel and Gretel (1954)
- The Angel with the Flaming Sword (1954)
- The Royal Waltz (1955)
- Lina Braake (1975)

== Bibliography ==
- Goble, Alan. The Complete Index to Literary Sources in Film. Walter de Gruyter, 1999.
