= And If We Should Meet Again =

1947 film

- Directed by: Hans Müller
- Written by: Hertha von Gebhardt (novel); Ernst Hasselbach
- Produced by: Helmuth Schönnenbeck; Peter Wehrand
- Starring: Paul Dahlke; Käthe Haack; Willi Rose
- Cinematography: Klaus von Rautenfeld
- Edited by: Anneliese Schönnenbeck
- Music by: Michael Jary
- Production company: Studio 45-Film
- Distributed by: Herzog Film
- Release date: 2 December 1947
- Running time: 92 minutes
- Country: Germany
- Language: German

And If We Should Meet Again (German: Und finden dereinst wir uns wieder) is a 1947 German drama film directed by Hans Müller and starring Paul Dahlke, Käthe Haack and Willi Rose. It was part of the post-war group of Rubble films. It was shot at the Tempelhof Studios in Berlin and on location around Lüdenscheid and at Altena Castle. The film's sets were designed by the art director Gerhard Ladner.

== Synopsis ==
In the final days of the Second World War, five boys evacuated to Westphalia want to travel to Berlin to defend the capital from Allied forces. Gradually they become more disillusioned by the war and their faith in the Nazi regime is broken. Gehlhorn, an older soldier, becomes an effective father figure to them and helps them survive the fighting.

== Cast ==
- Paul Dahlke as Studienrat Bockendahl
- Helmut Heyne as Assessor Hoefert
- Kurt Langanke as Assessor Paulke
- Käthe Haack as Wolfgang's Mother
- Willi Rose as Gefreiter Gehlhorn
- Lutz Moik as Wolfgang
- Hans Neie as Manfred
- Horst Gentzen as Max
- Dieter Bauer as Ulli
- Kaspar Brüninghaus as Ortsbauernfüher
- Hermann Düwell
- Morchen as Der Hund
- Carl Raddatz as Narrator
- Gunther Seehaus as Erich

== Bibliography ==
- Rentschler, Eric, ed. (2013). German Film and Literature: Adaptations and Transformations. Routledge. ISBN 978-1-136-36873-8.
