= Margot Trooger =

German actress

- Born: 2 June 1923; Rositz, Germany
- Died: 24 April 1994 (aged 70); Mörlenbach, Germany
- Occupation: Actress
- Years active: 1952–1976

Margot Trooger (2 June 1923 – 24 April 1994) was a German film actress. She appeared in 50 films between 1952 and 1976. She was born in Rositz, Germany, and died in Mörlenbach, Germany.

== Selected filmography ==
- I'll Make You Happy (1949) – Waitress at store bar (uncredited)
- When the Heath Dreams at Night (1952) – Helga
- Shooting Stars (1952) – Herta Wernicke
- The Confession of Ina Kahr (1954) – Margit Kahr
- Secrets of the City (1955) – Paula
- Roses in Autumn (1955) – Johanna
- Das Halstuch (1962, TV miniseries) – Marian Hastings
- Hypnosis (1962) – Katharina
- Eleven Years and One Day (1963) – Fanni Gruber
- Ein Frauenarzt klagt an (1964) – Lotte Hartmann
- Three for a Robbery (1964) – Margot Weimer
- Der Hexer (1964) – Cora Ann Milton
- Traitor's Gate (1964) – Dinah
- Neues vom Hexer (1965) – Cora Ann Milton
- The Swedish Girl (1965) – Margret Brinkmann
- Heidi (1965) – Fräulein Rottenmeier
- The Doctor Speaks Out (1966) – Frau Sidler
- La Grande Sauterelle (1967) – L'Américaine
- Das Rasthaus der grausamen Puppen (1967) – Marilyn Oland
- Jet Generation (1968)
- I'm an Elephant, Madame (1969) – Mrs. Nemitz
- Pippi Longstocking (1969) – Mrs. Prysselius
- Ellenbogenspiele (1969) – Jertrude
- Van de Velde: Das Leben zu zweit – Sexualität in der Ehe (1969) – Elisabeth
- Christoph Kolumbus oder Die Entdeckung Amerikas (1969, TV film) – Queen Isabella
- Pippi Goes on Board (1969) – Mrs. Prysselius
- Wir hau'n den Hauswirt in die Pfanne (1971) – Lenchen Kleinschmidt
- The Love Keys (1971) – Frau Stubenrauch
- Auch ich war nur ein mittelmäßiger Schüler (1974) – Fräulein Landgraf
