= Girls Behind Bars =

1949 film

- Directed by: Alfred Braun
- Written by: Otto-Heinz Jahn
- Produced by: Artur Brauner; Conrad Flockner
- Starring: Petra Peters; Richard Häussler; Edelweiß Malchin
- Cinematography: Fritz Arno Wagner
- Edited by: Walter Wischniewsky
- Music by: Herbert Trantow
- Production company: CCC Films
- Distributed by: Schorcht Filmverleih
- Release date: 15 November 1949
- Running time: 85 minutes
- Country: West Germany
- Language: German

Girls Behind Bars (German: Mädchen hinter Gittern) is a 1949 West German drama film directed by Alfred Braun and starring Petra Peters, Richard Häussler and Edelweiß Malchin. It was made at the Tempelhof Studios in West Berlin. The film's sets were designed by the art director Willi Herrmann. The film was remade as the 1965 film of the same title directed by Rudolf Zehetgruber.

== Cast ==
- Petra Peters as Ursula Schumann
- Richard Häussler as Breuhaus
- Edelweiß Malchin as Elfie Meyen
- Susi Deitz as Wanda Schmidt
- Gina Presgott as Irmchen Fischer, 'Würmchen'
- Marianne Prenzel as Lore Liebhold
- Micheline Hoerle as Isolde Loring, 'Isa'
- Gabriele Heßmann as Irmgard Rechenberg, 'Boss'
- Ruth Hausmeister as Ilse Heidenreich, 'Heidin'
- Berta Drews as Paula Rellspieß, 'Spiess'
- Else Ehser as Hanna Späthe, 'Hannchen'
- Elisabeth Wendt as Else Richnow, 'Bohnenstange'
- Ralph Lothar as Richard Halbes
- Fritz Wagner as Harald Hauffe
- Arno Paulsen as Helmcke
- Erich Dunskus as Franz Schmidt
- Alice Treff as Frau Schumann
- Renée Stobrawa as Frau Liebhold
- Hildegard Grethe as Frau Hardtcke
- Wolfgang Kühne as Dr. Helwig
- Carl Heinz Charrell as Paulus

== Bibliography ==
- Bergfelder, Tim. International Adventures: German Popular Cinema and European Co-Productions in the 1960s. Berghahn Books, 2005.
