= Hermann Braun =

German actor

Hermann Braun (November 1, 1917 – January 18 or 20, 1945) was a German film actor, and the son of chamber singer Carl Braun.

== Biography ==
New York City-born, Braun made his film debut in 1933 with Der Jäger aus Kurpfalz. Braun was initially slated for the role of "Heini Völker" in Hitlerjunge Quex. However, much to his regret, illness, prevented his from doing so. The part was played by Jürgen Ohlsen. He was Pola Negri's leading man in her Third Reich film The Secret Lie (1938), where he plays a young man in her life who we are led to believe is her young lover but turns out to be her son. Braun also played in the Emil Jannings picture The Dreamer (1936) and in the Veit Harlan-directed Jugend (1938). His final film was Kleine Mädchen - große Sorgen (1941), opposite actress Hannelore Schroth.

Unlike his father who was an early sympathizer with the Nazis and a member of the anti-Semitic Kampfbund für deutsche Kultur, Hermann Braun held an anti-Nazi stance and retired from (or was forced out of) the Nazi-controlled motion picture industry. Drafted into the German military, he saw action on the Russian front during World War II. Most sources state that he was killed in heavy fighting on January 18, 1945, near Łódź, Poland. However, the German War Graves Commission memorial for Braun states that he rose to the rank of Lieutenant and died on January 20, 1945. He was possibly wounded on January 18, with his death occurring two days later. He is buried at Lodz. Braun was 27 years old.

Braun descended from an artistic family. His father was a famous opera singer, his mother Gertrude Botz was a stage actress at the Lübeck Theater, and his sister Anne-Mary Braun was also an actress.

== Filmography ==
- Hitlerjunge Quex (1933; 95 mins), directed by Hans Steinhoff. Unable to perform title role due to illness.
- The Hunter from Kurpfalz (1933; 82 mins.) Directed by Carl Behr. Braun played the role of Jupp, Försterjunge.
- Holiday From Myself (1934) Directed by Hans Deppe. Braun played a supporting role.
- Achte mir auf Gakeki (1935; "short") Directed by Alwin Elling. Braun played an unnamed supporting role.
- Punks Arrives from America (1935; 90 mins.) Directed by Karlheinz Martin. Braun played "Caddy im Golfclub." (Title translation: "Punks Arrive from America.")
- The Dreamer (1936; 100 mins.) Directed by Carl Froelich. Braun played a supporting role as an unnamed man.
- Ride to Freedom (1937; 92 mins.) Directed by Karl Hartl. Braun played the role of a Polish Fähnrich (ensign) named Milewski.
- Jugend (1938; 93 mins.) Directed by Veit Harlan. Braun played the role of Hans. (Title translation: "Youth.")
- The Secret Lie (1938; 80 mins) Directed by Nunzio Malasomma. Braun played the role of Cecil Lasko. (Title translation: "The White Lie" or "The Pious Lie")
- What Now, Sibylle? (1938; 86 mins.) Directed by Peter Paul Brauer. Braun played the role of a schoolboy named Primanier Peter Kurre. (Title translation: "What to Do Sybil?")
- D III 88 (1939) Co-directed by Hans Bertram and Herbert Maisch. Braun played the role of Obergefreiter (Corporal) Robert Eckhard.
- The Fox of Glenarvon (1940; 91 mins.) Directed by Max W. Kimmich. Braun played the role of Desmond O'Morrow.
- Verwandte sind auch Menschen (1940; 79 mins.) Directed by Hans Deppe. Braun played the role of Kurt Thiele. (Title translation: "Relatives Are People Too.")
- Kleine Mädchen - große Sorgen (1941; 79 mins.) Directed by Boleslaw Barlog. Braun played the role of Hannes Fürst (Prince). (Title translation: "Little Girl—Very Worried.")
- Battle Squadron Lützow (1941; 97 mins.) Directed by Hans Bertram. Braun played the role of Unteroffizier (Sergeant) Eckhard. (Title translation: "Battle Squadron Lützow.")

== Bibliography ==
- Schlamp, Hans-Joacham. "Jugend, die den Film erobert 1. Folge-Hermann Braun." Reihe der Filmschriften (Germany), Vol. (Heft) 6, No. 1 (1934), pp. (Folgen) 20–24.
- Weniger, Kay. Zwischen Bühne und Baracke. Lexikon der verfolgten Theater-, Film- und Musikkünstler 1933 bis 1945. Metropol, Berlin 2008, ISBN 978-3-938690-10-9, S. 429 f.

== External links—Complete Films with Hermann Braun ==
- Traumulus (1935) YouTube video. (1:31:17)
- Ritt in die Freiheit (1937) YouTube video. (1:26:13)
- Jugend (1938) YouTube video. (1:27:10)
- D III 88 (1939) YouTube video. (1:44:28)
- Kampfgeschwader Lützow (1941) YouTube video. (1:38:52)
