= Little Red Riding Hood (1954 film) =

1954 film

Rotkäppchen
- Directed by: Walter Janssen
- Written by: Konrad Lustig; Jacob Grimm (story); Wilhelm Grimm (story)
- Based on: Little Red Riding Hood by Brothers Grimm
- Produced by: Hubert Schonger
- Starring: Maren-Inken Bielenberg; Elinor von Wallerstein; Ellen Frank; Wolfgang Eichberger; Peter Lehmann; Michael Beutner; Rudolf Gerhofer; Götz Wolf; Helge Lehmann
- Music by: Giuseppe Becce
- Release date: October 10, 1954 (West Germany)
- Running time: 54 min.
- Country: West Germany
- Language: German

Little Red Riding Hood (German: Rotkäppchen) is a German film, directed by Walter Janssen, based on the story of Little Red Riding Hood by the Brothers Grimm. It should not be confused with the 1953 German film Little Red Riding Hood which is also based on the fairy tale.

== Cast ==
- Maren-Inken Bielenberg – Little Red Riding Hood
- Elinor von Wallerstein – The Mother
- Ellen Frank – The Grandmother
- Wolfgang Eichberger – The Hunter

Little Red Riding Hood's Brothers:

- Peter Lehmann – Bammel
- Michael Beutner – Bommel
- Rudolf Gerhofer – Bummel
- Götz Wolf – Flock
- Helge Lehmann – Flick

== DVD release ==
In 2007, Rotkäppchen was released on DVD in Germany. The film was also part of five DVD boxset, which contained other classic live-action German fairytale films made in the 1950s.
