= Poison in the Zoo =

1952 film

- Directed by: Hans Müller; Wolfgang Staudte
- Written by: Edgar Kahn
- Produced by: Werner Ludwig
- Starring: Irene von Meyendorff; Carl Raddatz; Petra Peters
- Cinematography: Ekkehard Kyrath
- Edited by: Anneliese Schönnenbeck
- Music by: Marc Hendriks
- Production company: Camera-Filmproduktion
- Distributed by: National-Film
- Release date: 24 January 1952
- Running time: 84 minutes
- Country: West Germany
- Language: German

Poison in the Zoo (German: Gift im Zoo) is a 1952 West German thriller film directed by Hans Müller and Wolfgang Staudte and starring Irene von Meyendorff, Carl Raddatz and Petra Peters.

== Production ==
During production in 1951, director Wolfgang Staudte was removed and replaced when the West German authorities refused to consider the production eligible for state subsidies unless Staudte declared that he would no longer work for the DEFA studios of the Communist East German state. Staudte, who had made several major productions for DEFA, refused and was replaced by Müller.

The film was shot at the Wandsbek Studios in Hamburg and on location in the city's Tierpark Hagenbeck. The sets were designed by Albrecht Becker and Herbert Kirchhoff.

== Synopsis ==
After a series of mysterious deaths of animals at a zoo the police are called in to investigate.

== Cast ==
- Irene von Meyendorff as Vera Pauly
- Carl Raddatz as Dr. Martin Rettberg
- Petra Peters as Jutta Flamm
- Ernst Schröder as Oskar Beck
- Hermann Speelmans as Kriminalrat Walter Glasbrenner
- Nicolas Koline as Wärter Mathias
- Kurt Meister as Oberwärter Kruschke
- Otto Reimer as Wärter Robby
- Helmut Peine as Kriminalkommissar Werner
- Tilla Hohmann as Wirtschafterin Karola
- Hella Attenberger as Gaby Rettberg
- Alwin Pauli as Oberwärter Berger
- Bruno Klockmann as Polizeichef Dr. Wöltje

== Bibliography ==
- Hans-Michael Bock and Tim Bergfelder. The Concise Cinegraph: An Encyclopedia of German Cinema. Berghahn Books, 2009.
- Hanna Schissler. The Miracle Years: A Cultural History of West Germany, 1949–1968. Princeton University Press, 2001.
