= Homesick for Germany =

1954 film

- Directed by: Bernhard Radetzki
- Written by: Werner Eplinius; Janne Furch; Gunther Meyer
- Starring: Albert Lieven; Ingrid Lutz; Petra Peters
- Cinematography: Helmuth Nath; Klaus von Rautenfeld
- Music by: Hans Stoer
- Production company: Cito-Film
- Release date: 26 October 1954
- Running time: 84 minutes
- Country: West Germany
- Language: German

Homesick for Germany (German: Heimweh nach Deutschland) is a 1954 West German adventure film directed by Bernhard Radetzki and starring Albert Lieven, Ingrid Lutz, and Petra Peters. It is also known as Adventure in Lebanon (German: Abenteuer in Libanon.

It was shot in Eastmancolor.

== Cast ==
- Albert Lieven as Fred Berger
- Ingrid Lutz as Marion Ashar
- Petra Peters as Madame Dupont
- Karl-Maria Artel as Professor Ashar
- Arno Assmann as Pertrides
- Albert Florath
- Käthe Haack as Frau Berger
- Jan Hendriks as Erik Olsen
- Heinz Hofer
- Walter Holten
- Walter Janssen as Pfarrer
- Fritz Lafontaine

== Bibliography ==
- Parish, James Robert (1977). Film Actors Guide: Western Europe. Metuchen, NJ: Scarecrow Press. ISBN 978-0-8108-1044-0.
