= Michael Cramer (actor) =

German actor

Michael Cramer (1 March 1930 in Wickrath – 28 November 2000 Munich) was a German actor.

== Selected filmography ==
- A Life for Do (1954)
- A House Full of Love (1954)
- Fireworks (1954)
- The Perfect Couple (1954)
- Island of the Dead (1955)
- The Royal Waltz (1955)
- Through the Forests and Through the Trees (1956)
- The Hunter from Roteck (1956)
- Engagement at Wolfgangsee (1956)
- Der Etappenhase (1957)
- The Big Chance (1957)
- Sebastian Kneipp (1958)
- Sin Began with Eve (1958)
- Ooh... diese Ferien (1958)
- Babette Goes to War (1959)
- Adieu, Lebewohl, Goodbye (1961)
- The Battle of Sutjeska (1973)
- Stolen Heaven (1974)
