= The Staircase (1950 film) =

1950 film

- Directed by: Alfred Braun; Wolfgang Staudte
- Written by: Ralph Lothar
- Produced by: Alfred Braun; Hans von Wolzogen
- Starring: Hilde Körber; Herbert Stass; Paul Westermeier
- Cinematography: Georg Bruckbauer
- Edited by: Walter Wischniewsky
- Music by: Herbert Trantow
- Production company: Skala Film
- Distributed by: Norddeutscher Filmverleih
- Release date: 14 September 1950
- Running time: 78 minutes
- Country: West Germany
- Language: German

The Staircase (German: Die Treppe) is a 1950 West German drama film directed by Alfred Braun and (uncredited) Wolfgang Staudte, and starring Hilde Körber, Herbert Stass and Paul Westermeier. It was partly shot at the Wiesbaden Studios in Hesse. The film's sets were designed by the art directors Paul Markwitz and Fritz Maurischat.

== Synopsis ==
The film portrays the lives of the inhabitants of the four floors of a tenement building, connected by the staircase.

== Cast ==
- Hilde Körber as Frau Weide
- Herbert Stass as Willy Weide
- Liane Croon as Annelie Weber
- Paul Westermeier as Herr Schwebs
- Ursula Krieg as Frau Schwebs
- Olga Limburg as Frau Waberski
- Ralph Lothar as Heinz König
- Blandine Ebinger as Fräulein Zärting
- Hilde Sessak as Olga Scharnetzki
- Gerda Zinn as Frau Schulze
- Wolfgang Kühne as Herr Kühne
- Elisabeth Wendt as Frau Görisch
- Renate Reiche as Erika Görisch
- Joachim Teege as Herbert Ehrke
- Nicolas Koline as Opa
- Alfred Braun as Kriminalkommissar
- Renate Brausewetter
- Carl Heinz Charrell as Herr Müller
- Adalbert Gausche as Gastwirt Bunzel
- Käthe Jöken-König as Frau Müller

== Bibliography ==
- Hans-Michael Bock and Tim Bergfelder. The Concise Cinegraph: An Encyclopedia of German Cinema. Berghahn Books, 2009.
