= Lutz Moik =

German actor (1930–2002)

- Born: 10 November 1930; Berlin, Germany
- Died: 4 July 2002 (aged 71); Berlin, Germany
- Occupation: Actor
- Years active: 1945–1996

Lutz Moik (1930–2002) was a German film and television actor. He achieved his breakthrough with the leading role in the fairytale film Heart of Stone in 1950.

== Filmography ==
Year	Title	Role	Notes
1945	Meine Herren Söhne	Lutz Redwitz	
1945	Frühlingsmelodie		
1947	And If We Should Meet Again	Wolfgang	
1948	Thank You, I'm Fine	Otto Holk	
1948	1-2-3 Corona	Gerhard Wittmann	
1949	Und wenn's nur einer wär'	Michael	
1950	Five Suspects	Klaus Eriksen	
1950	Bürgermeister Anna	Matthias Lehmkuhl	
1950	Heart of Stone	Peter Munk	
1951	The Guilt of Doctor Homma	Gerhard Homma	
1951	Hanna Amon	Thomas Amon	
1952	The Merry Vineyard	Jochen Most	
1953	Christina	Klaus Stauffer	
1956	My Sixteen Sons	Christian Massow	
1956	Teenage Wolfpack	Kudde	Voice, Uncredited
1956	Das verbotene Paradies	Karl Wetterstein	
1958	Iron Gustav	Otto Kroppke	
1960	Heaven, Love and Twine	Erich Hofmann	
1960	Officer Factory	Fähnrich Kramer	
1965	The Oil Prince	Paddy	Voice, Uncredited
1965	The Desperado Trail	Schneller Panther	Voice, Uncredited
1978	Pastorale 1943	Duitser	

== Bibliography ==
- Goble, Alan. The Complete Index to Literary Sources in Film. Walter de Gruyter, 1999.
