= Shooting Stars (1952 film) =

1952 film

- Directed by: Hans Müller
- Written by: Otto-Heinz Jahn
- Produced by: Willy E. Specht
- Starring: Rudolf Prack; Ilse Steppat; Margot Trooger
- Cinematography: Albert Benitz
- Edited by: Luise Dreyer-Sachsenberg
- Music by: Friedrich Schröder
- Production company: Nord-Lux-Film
- Distributed by: Europa-Filmverleih
- Release date: 1952
- Running time: 90 minutes
- Country: West Germany
- Language: German

Shooting Stars (German: Lockende Sterne) is a 1952 West German drama film directed by Hans Müller and starring Rudolf Prack, Ilse Steppat and Margot Trooger. It was made at the Göttingen Studios and partly on location in Hamburg. The film's sets were designed by the art directors Mathias Matthies and Ellen Schmidt.

== Synopsis ==
A small town engine driver is convinced by a nightclub owner to move to Hamburg and try his luck as a performer. His fiancée, however, becomes concerned by the life he is now leading.

== Cast ==
- Rudolf Prack as Werner Nordhaus
- Ilse Steppat as Karena Rodde
- Margot Trooger as Herta Wernicke
- Paul Dahlke as Gerhard Sommer
- Nicolas Koline as Fedja
- Josef Sieber as Wilhelm Nordhaus
- Hermann Speelmans as Arthur Wernicke
- Käthe Haack as Hildegarde Wernicke
- Barbara Henschel as Aenne Nordhaus
- Klaus Becker as Oskar Becker
- Joachim Brennecke as Karl Ludwig Nordhaus
- Tonio von der Meden as Wölchen Nordhaus
- Horst Beck as Inspizient
- Josef Dahmen as Eisenbahner
- Karl Kramer
- Joachim Rake as Gordon
- Kurt Schwabach as Colman
- Max Walter Sieg
- Carl Voscherau as Lokführer
- Gert Niemitz

== Bibliography ==
- Hans-Michael Bock and Tim Bergfelder. The Concise Cinegraph: An Encyclopedia of German Cinema. Berghahn Books, 2009.
