= Jürgen Ohlsen =

German actor

- Born: 15 March 1917; Schöneberg, Berlin, German Empire
- Died: 23 September 1994 (aged 77); Düsseldorf, North Rhine-Westphalia, Germany
- Resting place: Friedhof Unterbach
- Occupation: Actor
- Notable work: Hitlerjunge Quex

Jürgen Ohlsen (15 March 1917 – 23 September 1994) was a German actor best remembered for portraying "Heini 'Quex' Völker" in the 1933 Nazi propaganda film Hitlerjunge Quex (Our Flag Leads Us Forward), as well as a decorated Iron Cross warrior.

== Career ==
Ohlsen was born in Schöneberg, Berlin, Germany on 15 March 1917. Due to the illness of actor Hermann Braun, Ohlsen inherited the leading role of Heini Völker (nicknamed 'Quex') in Hitlerjunge Quex (Our Flag Leads Us Forward, 1933). Units of the Berlin Hitler Youth also joined the cast of the film. Ohlsen himself was only credited as Ein Hitlerjunge (a Hitler Youth member). The film, based on the popular propaganda novel Der Hitlerjunge Quex, which was in turn based on the real-life murder of Hitler Youth member Herbert Norkus, was highly successful in Germany at the time.

Ohlsen joined the Hitler Youth in 1934 when the Nazis dissolved Berlin's Der Jungenbund Südlegion, of which he was a member. He appears not to have taken the Party's anti-Semitic position seriously, for in 1935 he was disciplined for repeatedly playing tennis with a Jew.

At the time, BBC broadcasts into Germany routinely spread scandalous stories about Nazi officials and other German public figures. One of these stories alleged that Ohlsen was a homosexual and the lover of Hitler Youth leader Baldur von Schirach. The rumor caught on in Germany and by at least the fall of 1938, the verb "quexen" (literally "to quex") had entered the Hitler Youth vocabulary as a euphemism for homosexual intercourse.

In 1935, Ohlsen played the role of a supporter of aviator Ernst Udet in Heinz Paul's Wunder des Fliegens (Wonder of Flying). His acting career subsequently ended and by 1940 he was no longer a public figure.

== Later years and death ==
After he reached adulthood, Ohlsen was deemed suspicious by the Nazi regime. According to a report by the Osnabrück Gestapo, during 1940 or 1941, it was considered to send him to a concentration camp where he would have been killed. David Welch, writing in Propaganda and the German Cinema, 1933–1945, stated that Ohlsen was later sent to a concentration camp due to his homosexuality according to the Supreme Headquarters Allied Expeditionary Force.

Ohlsen went from being an HJ to the NS Student Bund, then the Reich Labor Service, and on 15 January 1940, he entered the Wehrmacht where he served with distinction, winning both the Iron Cross II and the Iron Cross. He fought as a sapper on the Eastern Front between August 1941 and February 1944 in some ferocious Soviet battles. These included Charkov and Belgorod in October 1941, the Donetsk battle the next month, and from June to the end of December 1942, various significant defensive actions in and around Kirov. He was evacuated to the Military Hospital at Baden bei Wien (Vienna) due to "multiple grenade splinters throughout his entire body" and recovered there on 24 February 1944.

After World War II, Ohlsen led a private life. He died on 23 September 1994 in Düsseldorf, aged 77.

== Filmography ==
- Hitlerjunge Quex: Ein Film vom Opfergeist der deutschen Jugend also known as Our Flag Leads Us Forward. (1933; 95 mins.) Directed by Hans Steinhoff. Ohlsen played the starring role of Heini Völker. Title translation: Hitler Youth Quex. A Film of the Sacrifice of German Youth.
- Alle Macht mit (1933; 6 mins) Directed by Franz Wenzler
- Miracle of Flight (1935; 79 mins.) Directed by Heinz Paul Ohlsen played the role of Heinz Muthesius. German ace Ernst Udet starred in this film.

== Sources ==
- Baird, Jay W. (1992). To Die for Germany: Heroes in the Nazi Pantheon. Indiana University Press.a ISBN 9780253207579.
- Buscher, Paulus (1998) Das Stigma. Koblenz ISBN 978-3926584014
- Chiari, Bernhard, Matthias Rogg, and Wolfgang Schmidt, eds. Krieg und Militär im Film des 20. Jahrhunderts. Oldenbourg Verlag, 2003. ISBN 3486567160
- Gillespie, William (2022). Hitler Youth Quex – A Guide for the English–speaking Reader, German Films Dot Net, Potts Point, NSW, Australia, ISBN ISBN 978-0-9808612-7-3
- Hergemöller, Bernd-Ulrich (2001), Mann für Mann–Ein biographisches Lexikon (in German), Hamburg: Suhrkamp Taschenbuch, ISBN 3-518-39766-4
- "Perfect Youth: Irks Nazis By Associating With Jew." New York Times, August 23, 1935, p. 9. (Subscription only)
- Rentschler, Eric (1993) Emotional engineering: Hitler youth Quex. Center for German and European Studies, University of California,
- Rentschler, Eric (1996) The Ministry of Illusion: Nazi Cinema and Its Afterlife. Cambridge, MA: Harvard University Press ISBN 978-0674576407
- Steinwascher, Gerd, ed. Gestapo Osnabrück meldet--: Polizei- und Regierungsberichte aus dem Regierungsbezirk Osnabrück aus den Jahren 1933 bis 1936. Osnabrück, Germany: Selbstverlag des Vereins für Geschichte und Landeskunde von Osnabrück, 1995, p. 267, Entry No. 29. ISBN 3980341232
- Holmstrom, John. The Moving Picture Boy: An International Encyclopaedia from 1895 to 1995, Norwich, Michael Russell, 1996, p. 95.
- Welch, David (1983). Propaganda and the German Cinema: 1933-1945. I.B. Tauris. ISBN 9781860645204.
