= The Girl from the Marsh Croft (1935 film) =

1935 film

- Directed by: Detlef Sierck
- Written by: Selma Lagerlöf (novel); Philipp Lothar Mayring
- Produced by: Peter Paul Brauer
- Starring: Hansi Knoteck; Ellen Frank; Eduard von Winterstein
- Cinematography: Willy Winterstein
- Edited by: Fritz Stapenhorst
- Music by: Hans-Otto Borgmann
- Production company: UFA
- Distributed by: UFA
- Release date: 30 October 1935
- Running time: 82 minutes
- Country: Germany
- Language: German

The Girl from the Marsh Croft (German: Das Mädchen vom Moorhof) is a 1935 German drama film directed by Detlef Sierck and starring Hansi Knoteck, Ellen Frank and Eduard von Winterstein. It was adapted from the 1908 novel The Girl from the Marsh Croft by Nobel Prize winning Swedish author Selma Lagerlöf. It has been described as a "prototype Heimatfilm. It was remade in 1958.

The film's sets were designed by the art director Carl Ludwig Kirmse. Location shooting took place on the Teufelsmoor north of Bremen.

== Synopsis ==
Young farmer Karsten travels to town to select a maid to help his mother on their family farm. He is unimpressed by any of the girls offering their services, but is won over by Helga, an impoverished girl he sees in the town courthouse. She has filed a paternity suit against a farmer who fathered her illegitimate child, but when the farmer prepares to falsely swear on a Bible that he is not the father, she withdraws her suit, saying she would rather her child have no legal father than a father who would falsely swear in court. Karsten is impressed by her courage and offers her the job on his farm.

Karsten's fiancée, Gertrud, is not pleased when she sees how friendly he is with his pretty new maid. Gertrud is the daughter of the town bailiff. She is wealthier than Karsten, so it is a socially advantageous match for Karsten's family. Gertrud becomes jealous of Helga and finally demands that Karsten fire Helga. He refuses, but his mother talks Helga into going home, for the good of Karsten's whole family. When Karsten learns this, he is furious. He finds Helga and takes her with him to church, shocking the townsfolk.

Gertrud demands that Karsten choose between her and the maid. Unable to choose, Karsten gets blind drunk with friends on his wedding night and wakes up the next day to hear a man was murdered at the bar he was carousing at. Karsten believes he is the killer, because the victim had a broken half of a knife in his corpse, and Karsten's knife is mysteriously broken. He goes to the wedding ceremony and calls it off, saying he intends to turn himself in to the police.

When Helga is informed of this, she is horrified, because she broke his knife without telling him, so she knows he's innocent. She races to Karsten's house, where she finds Gertrud. Helga tells Gertrud to go to Karsten and, without telling him that she knows he is innocent, tell him she will stand by him no matter what. Meanwhile, Helga will go to the authorities and clear Karsten's name.

Gertrud realizes that Helga loves Karsten so much that she cares more about his happiness than her own. Gertrud goes to Karsten, but cannot bring herself to lie. Instead, she reveals everything to Karsten and calls off the wedding, telling him to go to Helga. Karsten finds Helga and they agree to marry.

== Release dates and different film titles ==
The film premiered in Germany in Berlin on October 30, 1935. It was released in France under the title La fille des marais, in Italy under the title La ragazza di Moorhof and in the USA under the title The Girl from the Marsh Croft or The Girl of the Moors. The film was first broadcast on German television on May 3, 1988 on ZDF.

== Cast ==
- Hansi Knoteck as Helga Christmann
- Ellen Frank as Gertrud Gerhart
- Kurt Fischer-Fehling as Karsten Dittmar
- Friedrich Kayßler as Mr. Dittmar
- Eduard von Winterstein as Mr. Gerhart
- Jeanette Bethge as Mrs. Dittmar
- Lina Carstens as Mrs. Christmann
- Franz Stein as Mr. Christmann
- Erwin Klietsch as Peter Nolde
- Theodor Loos as Judge
- Fritz Hoopts as Peat skipper
- Erich Dunskus as Jens Willgraff
- Hans Meyer-Hanno as Foreman
- Carl Jönsson as Marten
- Klaus Pohl as Juryman
- Dorothea Thiess

== Bibliography ==
- Bergfelder, Tim (2005). International Adventures: German Popular Cinema and European Co-productions in the 1960s. Berghahn Books. ISBN 978-1-57181-539-2.
