= The Angel with the Flaming Sword =

1954 film

- Directed by: Gerhard Lamprecht
- Written by: Klaus Hellmer (novel); Curt J. Braun
- Starring: Gertrud Kückelmann; Martin Benrath; Petra Peters
- Cinematography: Friedl Behn-Grund
- Music by: Lothar Brühne
- Production company: Omega Film
- Distributed by: Neue Filmverleih
- Release date: 22 October 1954
- Running time: 107 minutes
- Country: West Germany
- Language: German

The Angel with the Flaming Sword (German: Der Engel mit dem Flammenschwert) is a 1954 West German drama film directed by Gerhard Lamprecht and starring Gertrud Kückelmann, Martin Benrath and Petra Peters.

The film's sets were designed by the art directors Wolf Englert and Max Mellin.

== Cast ==
- Gertrud Kückelmann as Helga Marein
- Martin Benrath as Jürgen Marein
- Petra Peters as Inge Lennartz
- Maria Wimmer as Gitta Binder
- Heini Göbel as Ernst Faber
- Paul Bildt as Regierungsrat Marein
- Hilde Sessak as Elfriede Marein
- Jan Hendriks as Freddy
- Siegfried Lowitz as Krüger
- Werner Hessenland as Dr. Arlin
- Christian Wilhelm as Ulli
- Monika Franke as Monika - genannt Puppe
- Robert Dietl
- Lucie Englisch
- Ellen Frank
- Auguste Hansen-Kleinmichel
- Maria Krahn
- Carsta Löck
- Karl-Heinz Peters
- Arthur Schröder
- Kai-Siegfried Seefeld
- Ernst Stahl-Nachbaur

== Bibliography ==
- Goble, Alan. The Complete Index to Literary Sources in Film. Walter de Gruyter, 1999.
