= Rita-Maria Nowotny =

German actress (1925–2000)

- Born: 1 June 1925; Germany
- Died: 9 September 2000 (aged 75); Berlin, Germany
- Other name: Rita-Maria Nowottnick
- Occupation: Actress

Rita-Maria Nowotny (1 June 1925 – 9 September 2000) was a German actress. She was married to Fritz Genschow and appeared in a series of films directed by him in the 1950s which were based on stories by the Brothers Grimm.

== Selected filmography ==
- Little Red Riding Hood (1953)
- Hansel and Gretel (1954)
- Mother Holly (1954)
- The Wishing-Table (1956)
- The Goose Girl (1957)

== Bibliography ==
- Goble, Alan. The Complete Index to Literary Sources in Film. Walter de Gruyter, 1999.
