= Christina (1953 film) =

1953 film

- Directed by: Fritz Eichler
- Written by: Charlotte Kaiser-Henschke; Hanns Schuster
- Starring: Barbara Rütting; Lutz Moik; Franziska Kinz
- Cinematography: Otto Baecker
- Edited by: Ilse Voigt
- Music by: Herbert Windt
- Production company: Fanal-Filmproduktion
- Distributed by: Europa-Filmverleih
- Release date: 9 October 1953
- Running time: 98 minutes
- Country: West Germany
- Language: German

Christina is a 1953 West German drama film directed by Fritz Eichler and starring Barbara Rütting, Lutz Moik and Franziska Kinz. It was shot at the Tempelhof Studios in West Berlin. The film's sets were designed by the art director Wilhelm Vorwerg.

== Plot ==
Christina Neuhaus gets a job with the Stauffers. The young woman, whose home is Transylvania, is one of those displaced from home and had to leave her parents' property in Karlsaue after the war. Klaus Stauffer runs a mill with his mother Anna, which is in bad shape. In accordance with his mother's wishes, Klaus is as good as engaged to the rich banker's daughter Renate Frank, and also believes that he has found the woman for life in her. That changes when Christina comes to the Stauffers' house. From the start, Klaus is drawn to the warm, natural woman. The old servant Czybulka, who also had to flee his homeland Transylvania, immediately takes Christina to his heart. And the manufacturer Werner Holk is also increasingly drawn to the Stauffers' mill.

Klaus Stauffer does not yet dare to oppose his mother's wishes, although he clearly senses that it is love that draws him to Christina. So he hesitates and lets the young woman, who has also been devoted to him from the start, believe that he is serious about her. When Czybulka explains to Christina that Klaus is with Renate Frank, she is hurt and withdraws. Although Klaus tries to talk to his mother, she insists that he marry the banker's daughter. Without Klaus knowing about it, she tells Christina to leave the house after this conversation and tells her that she cannot stay longer because Renate, her son's future wife, cannot be expected to live with her under the same roof.

Holk finds Christina in this mood and, in his charming way, offers her a position, which she accepts after some hesitation. Although Holk is courting the young woman, he is content with a friendship for the time being. Shortly thereafter, Holk shows Christina an invitation he had received for the wedding of Renate and Klaus. When they both go out together some time later, her path leads her to the very place where Klaus is celebrating his bachelorette party with Renate that evening. Although Holk wants to leave immediately, Christina defiantly asks him to dance - according to a peasant custom - and thus causes an uproar. Renate is beside herself and gives Klaus an ultimatum. He cancels their engagement. His mother now thinks everything is lost. A conversation with old Czybulka makes her think. Shortly thereafter, Klaus makes it clear to his mother that he will marry Christina, even if that might doom the family business.

Klaus' mother finally realizes that she has done the wrong thing and that her son's happiness is more important than financial security. She no longer withholds her blessings from the young couple. But Holk, on whom the mill is dependent, also shows that he is a man with stature and promises to support the Stauffers with orders. Christina is now not only with the man she loves, but also has a home again.

== Cast ==
- Barbara Rütting as Christina Neuhaus
- Lutz Moik as Klaus Stauffer
- Franziska Kinz as Frau Anna Stauffer
- Eva Rimski as Renate Frank
- Werner Fuetterer as Direktor Werner Holk
- Paul Esser as Fritz Ohlsen, Knecht
- Ethel Reschke as Kene, Großmagd
- Carsta Löck as Emma
- Karl Hellmer as Czybulka, alter Knecht
- Brigitte Rau as Katrin
- Arno Paulsen as Bankier Frank
- Herbert Hübner as Siegfried, Apotheker
- Werner Stock as Stephan, 'Tageblatt'
- Paul Heidemann as Notar
- Renate Fischer as Mädchen auf Dorffest
- Elsa Wagner as Mutter Krause
- Agnes Windeck as Luise, Frau des Notars
- Charlotte Agotz as Kitty, Frau des Apothekers
- Odette Orsy as Babette
- Kurt Getke as Jagdfreund von Holk
- Charly Knetschke as Thomas, Knecht
- Reinhard Kolldehoff as Kavalier
- Sonja Ziemann
