= The Hunter from Roteck =

1956 film

- Directed by: Hermann Kugelstadt
- Written by: Fritz Böttger
- Based on: The Hunter from Roteck by André Mairock
- Produced by: Helmut Meyer
- Starring: Michael Cramer; Doris Kirchner; Oskar Sima
- Cinematography: Karl Schröder
- Edited by: Caspar van den Berg
- Music by: Conny Schumann
- Production company: Panorama-Film
- Distributed by: Panorama-Film
- Release date: 16 February 1956
- Running time: 88 minutes
- Country: West Germany
- Language: German

The Hunter from Roteck (German: Der Jäger vom Roteck) is a 1956 West German drama film directed by Hermann Kugelstadt and starring Michael Cramer, Doris Kirchner and Oskar Sima. It is a heimatfilm, made when the genre was at its peak.

It was shot at the Göttingen Studios in Lower Saxony, Germany. The film's sets were designed by the art directors Walter Blokesch and Curt Stallmach.

== Cast ==
- Michael Cramer as Bert Steiner
- Doris Kirchner as Johanna
- Oskar Sima as Attenberger
- Heinz Engelmann as Matthias Feldner
- Petra Peters as Christl, Sennerin
- Emmerich Schrenk as Georg Rüst
- Beppo Brem as Jadriga
- Lucie Englisch as Mutter Attenberger
- Ado Riegler as Forstwart

== Bibliography ==
- Meier, Gustav. Filmstadt Göttingen: Bilder für eine neue Welt? : zur Geschichte der Göttinger Spielfilmproduktion 1945 bis 1961. Reichold, 1996.
