= When the Heath Dreams at Night =

1952 film

- Directed by: Paul Martin
- Written by: Juliane Kay; Paul Martin; Tibor Yost
- Starring: Rudolf Prack; Viktor Staal; Margot Trooger
- Cinematography: Willy Winterstein
- Edited by: Hermann Ludwig
- Music by: Herbert Windt
- Production companies: Apollo-Film; Berolina Film
- Distributed by: Gloria Film
- Release date: 19 December 1952
- Running time: 98 minutes
- Country: West Germany
- Language: German

When the Heath Dreams at Night (German: Wenn abends die Heide träumt) is a 1952 West German drama film directed by Paul Martin and starring Rudolf Prack, Viktor Staal and Margot Trooger. It was shot in the Göttingen Studios and on Lüneburg Heath. The film's sets were designed by the art directors Carl Ludwig Kirmse and Walter Kutz.

== Synopsis ==
A young man who works making safe unexploded Second World War bombs on Lüneburg Heath invites an old wartime comrade to stay with him. However, problems ensue when the visitor falls in love with his fiancée.

== Cast ==
- Rudolf Prack as Peter Gelius, Sprengmeister
- Viktor Staal as Karl Odewig
- Margot Trooger as Helga
- Fita Benkhoff as Hermine Knauer
- Siegfried Breuer as Konsul Berghaus
- Margarete Haagen as Frau Odewig, Karls Mutter
- Ilse Steppat as Brigitte
- Beppo Brem as Xaver Franz
- Albert Florath as Bürgermeister Knauer
- Walter Franck
- Ernst Deutsch
- Otto Gebühr
- Berta Drews
- Walter Gross
- Reinhard Kolldehoff
- Franz-Otto Krüger
- Paul Heidemann
- Else Reval
- Hans Stiebner
- Victor Janson
- Werner Stock
- Arno Paulsen
- Erich Dunskus
- Erwin Biegel
- Gustav Bertram

== Bibliography ==
- Spicer, Andrew. Historical Dictionary of Film Noir. Scarecrow Press, 2010.
