= Ilse Steppat =

German actress

- Steppat as Irma Bunt in On Her Majesty's Secret Service (1969)
- Born: Ilse Paula Steppat; 30 November 1917; Wuppertal, German Empire
- Died: 21 December 1969 (aged 52); West Berlin, West Germany
- Occupation: Actress
- Years active: 1932–1969

Ilse Paula Steppat (30 November 1917 – 21 December 1969) was a German actress. Her husband was noted actor and director Max Nosseck.

== Biography ==
She began her cinematic career at the age of 15 playing Joan of Arc. Steppat appeared regularly on the German stage, and starred in more than forty movies. In the 1960s, she appeared frequently in crime movies based on the work of author Edgar Wallace, such as Die Gruft mit dem Rätselschloss, Der unheimliche Mönch and Die blaue Hand, which brought her great fame in Germany.

In her only English-language role, Steppat played Blofeld's assistant and henchwoman Irma Bunt in the James Bond movie On Her Majesty's Secret Service.

In the first English-language conversation between Steppat and the movie's producer, Albert R. Broccoli, she confused the word verlobt (engaged) with engagiert (involved).

Despite this, however, she was awarded the role of Irma Bunt. Steppat was unable to capitalise on her new fame outside Germany, as she died of a heart attack only four days after the movie's international release. She was buried in the Waldfriedhof Dahlem in Berlin. Her character was intended to return in Diamonds Are Forever with Steppat reprising her role. However her character was withdrawn after the actress's death.

== Selected filmography ==
- 1947: Marriage in the Shadows – Elisabeth Maurer
- 1949: Die Brücke – Therese Sander
- 1949: The Blue Swords – Frau von Tschirnhausen
- 1950: The Man Who Wanted to Live Twice – Oberschwester Hilde
- 1950: The Rabanser Case – Baronin Felten
- 1951: Die Tat des Anderen
- 1951: Veronika the Maid – Alice
- 1951: The Guilt of Doctor Homma – Dr. Ilse Kersten
- 1951: Hanna Amon – Vera Colombani
- 1952: When the Heath Dreams at Night – Brigitte
- 1952: Shooting Stars – Karena Rodde
- 1953: The Chaplain of San Lorenzo – Isabella Catani
- 1954: Captain Wronski – Leonore Cronberg
- 1954: The Phantom of the Big Tent – Dolores, Frau mit dem Löwen
- 1955: Doctor Solm – Claudia Möllenhauer, Tochter
- 1955: The Dark Star – Frl. Rieger, die Lehrerin
- 1955: Die Ratten – Frau Knobbe
- 1955: The Captain and His Hero – Yvonne
- 1956: Winter in the Woods – Frieda Stengel
- 1956: Weil du arm bist, muβt du früher sterben – Ada Schenk
- 1957: Der Adler vom Velsatal – Coletta Nicolini
- 1957: Confessions of Felix Krull – Maria Pia Kuckuck
- 1958: Night Nurse Ingeborg – Frau Burger
- 1958: Madeleine Tel. 13 62 11 – Frau Clavius
- 1958: Ósmy dzień tygodnia – Walicka
- 1958: Sehnsucht hat mich verführt – Brandner-Bäuerin
- 1958: Romarei, das Mädchen mit den grünen Augen – Witwe Prang
- 1960: Pension Schöller – Amalie Schöller
- 1960: Im Namen einer Mutter – Frau Barlowsky
- 1960: You Don't Shoot at Angels – Bellini
- 1962: The Post Has Gone – Elfriede Stolze
- 1963: Apartmentzauber – Sittenkommissarian
- 1963: The Invisible Terror – Dr. Louise Richards
- 1964: The Curse of the Hidden Vault – Margaret
- 1965: The Sinister Monk – Lady Patricia
- 1966: Living It Up – Carol Stevens
- 1967: Creature with the Blue Hand – Lady Emerson
- 1968: Death in the Red Jaguar – Mrs. Cunnings
- 1969: On Her Majesty's Secret Service – Irma Bunt (final film role)
