= Petra Peters =

German actress (1925–2004)

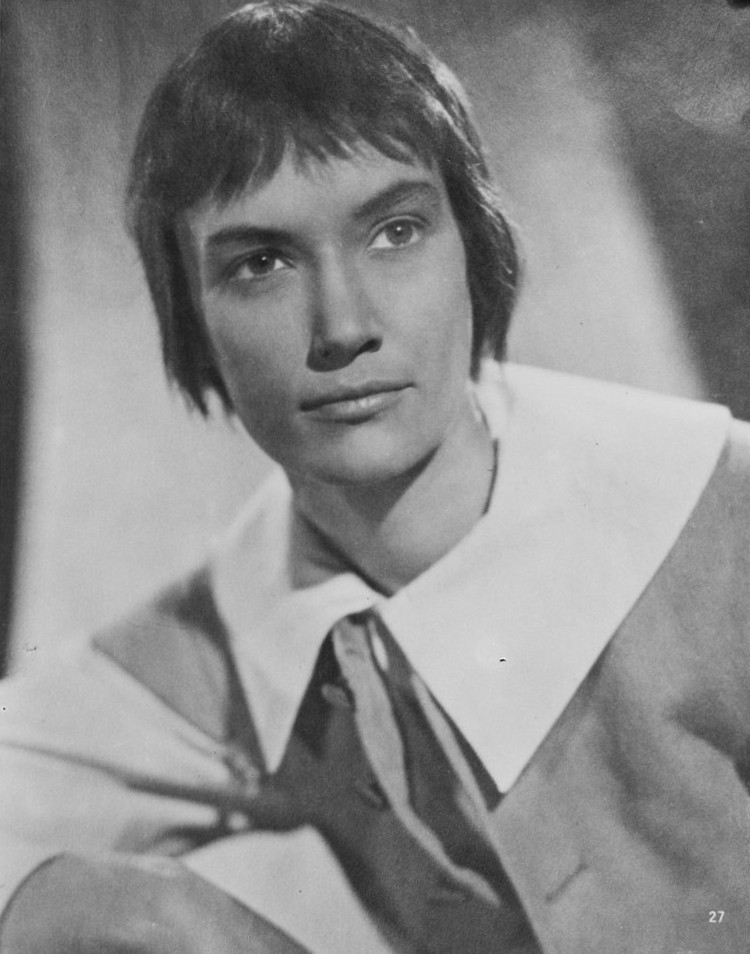
- Peters in her debut film Christine (1949)
- Born: 31 March 1925; Remscheid, Germany
- Died: 31 July 2004 (aged 79); Munich, Germany
- Occupation: Actress
- Years active: 1949–1988 (film and TV)
- Spouse(s): Albert Lieven (m. 1955; div. 19??)

Petra Peters (31 March 1925 – 31 July 2004) was a German stage and film actress. In the late 1940s, she made her name appearing in films made by the East German DEFA studio.

She was married to the actor Albert Lieven.

== Selected filmography ==
- Christine (1949)
- Anonymous Letters (1949)
- Don't Play with Love (1949)
- Girls Behind Bars (1949)
- Der Kahn der fröhlichen Leute (1950)
- Furioso (1950)
- Shadows Over Naples (1951)
- Poison in the Zoo (1952)
- Monks, Girls and Hungarian Soldiers (1952)
- Homesick for Germany (1954)
- The Angel with the Flaming Sword (1954)
- Island of the Dead (1955)
- The Hunter from Roteck (1956)
- To the Devil a Daughter (1976)

== Bibliography ==
- Goble, Alan. The Complete Index to Literary Sources in Film. Walter de Gruyter, 1999.
