= Carola Lamberti – Eine vom Zirkus =

1954 film

Carola Lamberti - Eine vom Zirkus
- Directed by: Hans Müller
- Written by: Artur A. Kuhnert
- Starring: Henny Porten
- Cinematography: Fritz Lehmann
- Release date: 1954
- Running time: 90 minutes
- Country: East Germany
- Language: German

Carola Lamberti – Eine vom Zirkus is an East German drama film directed by Hans Müller. It was released in 1954.

== Cast ==
- Henny Porten as Carola Lamberti
- Horst Naumann as Camillo Lamberti
- Rüdiger Renn as Eduard Lamberti (as Hans-Rüdiger Renn)
- Edwin Marian as Pero Lamberti
- Ursula Kempert as Viola
- Catja Görna as Ines Lamberti
- Johannes Arpe as Stegemann
- Hans Klering as Borbasch
- Herbert Richter as Mollenkamp
- Herbert Kiper as Willem
- Fritz Schlegel as Möckwitz
- Jürgen Krumwiede as Meschik
