= Carl Heinz Charrell =

German actor (1893–1958)

Carl Heinz Carrell
- Born: 16 December 1893; Oldenburg, German Empire
- Died: June 6, 1958 (aged 64); Berlin, Germany
- Occupation(s): Stage actor, film actor

Carl Heinz Carrell (December 16, 1893 – June 6, 1958) was a German stage and film actor.

Carl Heinz Carrell appeared in nine movies between 1932 and 1955, mostly in small roles. He also worked as a stage actor and as the German dubbing voice for actors such as James Gleason in The Night of the Hunter and John Carradine in Johnny Guitar.

== Filmography ==
- Herr über Leben und Tod (1955)
- The Staircase (1950)
- Girls Behind Bars (1949)
- The Roundabouts of Handsome Karl (1938)
- The Beaver Coat (1937)
- Gabriele: eins, zwei, drei (1937)
- Augustus the Strong (1936)
- Unheimliche Geschichten (1932)
- The Living Dead (1932)
- Kuhle Wampe oder: Wem gehört die Welt? (1932)
