= The Sporck Battalion (1934 film) =

1934 German drama film

- Directed by: Rolf Randolf; Theodor Loos
- Written by: Richard Skowronnek (novel); Bobby E. Lüthge
- Starring: Fritz Genschow; Werner Schott; Erich Fiedler
- Cinematography: Karl Puth
- Edited by: Ludolf Grisebach
- Music by: Fritz Wenneis
- Production company: Rolf Randolf-Film
- Distributed by: Bavaria Film
- Release date: 30 August 1934
- Running time: 95 minutes
- Country: Germany
- Language: German

The Sporck Battalion (German: Die sporck'schen Jäger) is a 1934 German drama film directed by Rolf Randolf and Theodor Loos and starring Fritz Genschow, Werner Schott and Erich Fiedler. It is based on a novel of the same name which had previously been made into the 1927 silent film The Sporck Battalion.

It was shot at the Bavaria Studios in Munich and on location around the Masuren Lakes in East Prussia. The film's sets were designed by the art director Heinrich Richter.

== Cast ==
- Fritz Genschow as Leutnant v. Naugaard
- Werner Schott as Hauptmann Rabenhainer
- Erich Fiedler as Oberleutnant v. Vahlenberg
- Theodor Loos as Oberförster Rüdiger
- Reva Holsey as Elsbeth, seine Tochter
- Fritz Alberti as Oberstleutnant
- Paul Rehkopf as Vater Retelsdorf, Fischermeister
- Margarete Kupfer as Seine Frau
- Rotraut Richter as Mike, beider Tochter
- Paul Westermeier as Heinrich Kremzow, Fischergeselle
- Erik Ode
- Ida Perry
- Antonie Jaeckel
- Frank Günther
- Michael von Newlinsky
- Max Wilmsen
- Franz Klebusch

== Bibliography ==
- Waldman, Harry. Nazi Films in America, 1933-1942. McFarland, 2008.
