= Walter Tjaden =

German film producer and sound engineer

- Born: 9 July 1906; Oldenburg, German Empire
- Died: 4 November 1985 (aged 79); Starnberg, Bavaria, West Germany
- Occupations: Producer, Sound engineer
- Years active: 1930-1977 (film)

Walter Tjaden (1906–1985) was a German film producer and sound engineer.

== Selected filmography ==
=== Sound engineer ===
- Her Majesty Love (1931)
- Hitler Youth Quex (1932)

=== Producer ===
- Darling of the Sailors (1937)
- Hotel Sacher (1939)
- A House Full of Love (1954)
- The Unexcused Hour (1957)
- One Should Be Twenty Again (1958)
- Labyrinth (1959)
- The White Horse Inn (1960)
- The New Adventures of Snow White (1969)
- The Captain (1971)
- Women in Hospital (1977)

== Bibliography ==
- Giesen, Rolf. Nazi Propaganda Films: A History and Filmography. McFarland, 2003.
