= Reinhard Kolldehoff =

German actor (1914-1995)

- Born: 29 April 1914; Berlin, German Empire
- Died: 18 November 1995 (aged 81); Berlin, Germany
- Other name: René Kolldehoff
- Occupation: Actor
- Years active: 1941–1988

Reinhard Kolldehoff (29 April 1914 – 18 November 1995), sometimes credited as René Kolldehoff, was a German actor and voice artist. A prolific character player, he played over 200 film, television, stage, and radio roles in a career which spanned over 50 years. He was one of the busiest actors of the German-language post-war cinema, who also thrived in international film.

== Biography ==
The son of a postal worker, Kolldehoff was born in Berlin in 1914, he financed his Abitur and later his private acting lessons by taking on extra roles at the Großes Schauspielhaus and the State Opera.

He made his professional stage debut in 1936 at the Landestheater Altenburg, and his film debut in the 1941 Heinz Rühmann film The Gasman. The same year, he was called up to military service. After World War II, he joined the ensemble company of the Hebbel-Theater, and also performed at the Deutsches Schauspielhaus under Gustaf Gründgens. He appeared in 140 films between 1941 and 1988.

Throughout his career, Kolldehoff worked with many significant directors, including Fritz Lang, Helmut Käutner, Falk Harnack, Henri Verneuil, Claude Chabrol, Jacques Tati, Gérard Oury, Marcel Camus, Glauber Rocha, Édouard Molinaro, Jacques Deray, Joseph Losey, Paul Verhoeven, Serge Gainsbourg, Philippe de Broca and Luchino Visconti. He was sometimes credited as René Kolldehoff.

=== Later life and death ===
Kolldehoff retired from acting in the late 1980s after being diagnosed with Parkinson's disease and diabetes. He died in Berlin in 1995, aged 81.

== Selected filmography ==
- The Gasman (1941) - Polizeibeamter (uncredited)
- Blum Affair (1949) - Max Tischbein - Lehrer
- Das Mädchen Christine (1949) - 1.Leutnant
- Quartet of Five (1949) - Patient
- Martina (1949)
- Rotation (1949) - Rudi Wille
- Unser täglich Brot (1949)
- Hoegler's Mission (1950) - Fichte
- Bürgermeister Anna (1950) - Jupp Ucker
- The Orplid Mystery (1950) - Funker
- Melody of Fate (1950)
- A Tale of Five Cities (1951) - Nazi (uncredited)
- The Last Year (1951) - Kommissar
- Turtledove General Delivery (1952)
- Full House (1952) - Hartner (segment "Je suis un tendre")
- I Lost My Heart in Heidelberg (1952) - Kapitän Reimann
- The Merry Vineyard (1952) - Küfer
- When the Heath Dreams at Night (1952)
- We'll Talk About Love Later (1953)
- Knall and Fall as Detectives (1953)
- The Man Between (1953) - Eastern German Police Officer commanding the hunt for Ivo Kern and Susanne Mallison (uncredited)
- Christina (1953) - Kavalier
- Weg ohne Umkehr (1953)
- Father Is Being Stupid (1953)
- Gitarren der Liebe (1954)
- Unternehmen Edelweiß (1954) - Erich
- Stopover in Orly (1955) - Joseph
- The Star of Rio (1955) - Torres
- Sergeant Borck (1955) - Spediteur Süßkind
- Hanussen (1955) - Biberger
- Urlaub auf Ehrenwort (1955) - Otto Sasse
- The Missing Scientists (1955) - Kolchak
- The Girl from Flanders (1956) - 1. Revolutionär / Simon's Henchmen
- The Captain from Köpenick (1956) - Drunken soldier
- The Story of Anastasia (1956) - Fichte
- Liane, Jungle Goddess (1956) - Keller
- Kalle wird Bürgermeister (1957)
- Tired Theodore (1957) - Hotelgast
- Das haut hin (1957) - Kuhlmann, Zirkusangestellter
- Das Glück liegt auf der Straße (1957)
- The Fox of Paris (1957) - Werner Biener, SD-Beamter
- The Copper (1958) - Willy
- Les aventuriers du Mékong (1958) - Gunther
- Confess, Doctor Corda (Gestehen Sie, Dr. Corda, 1958) - Kriminalbeamter
- Hoppla, jetzt kommt Eddie (1958) - Assistant of the Hotelier
- Liebe kann wie Gift sein (1958) - Achill
- Romarei, das Mädchen mit den grünen Augen (1958) - Funker Blessing
- Cigarettes, Whiskey and Wild Women (1959)
- Stalingrad: Dogs, Do You Want to Live Forever? (1959)
- Court Martial (Kriegsgericht, 1959) - Feldwebel
- Das Nachtlokal zum Silbermond (1959)
- And That on Monday Morning (Und das am Montagmorgen, 1959) - Herr Müller
- Bobby Dodd greift ein (1959)
- Der Frosch mit der Maske (1959) - Lew Brady
- La verte moisson (1959)
- Orientalische Nächte (1960) - Jemzeff
- Le 7eme jour de Saint-Malo (1960) - Von Sullock - le commandant allemand du camp
- The Thousand Eyes of Dr. Mabuse (Die 1000 Augen des Dr. Mabuse, 1960) - Roberto Menil alias 'Klumpfuß'
- The Secret Ways (1961) - The Count's man
- Vacances en enfer (1961)
- The Strange Countess (Die seltsame Gräfin, 1961) - Kriminalassistent Oliver Frank aka Butler John Addams
- This Time It Must Be Caviar (1961)
- Das Mädchen und der Staatsanwalt (1962)
- The Counterfeit Traitor (1962) - Col. Erdmann (uncredited)
- Murder in Rio (1963) - Harry
- Bergwind (1963) - Mr. Wright
- Bob Morane (1964, TV Series) - Ricardo Ruiz
- Le Chant du monde (1965) - Mandru
- Man on the Spying Trapeze (1966) - Nick Collins
- Line of Demarcation (La Ligne de démarcation, 1966) - Major von Pritsch
- To Skin a Spy (1966) - Hoffman (uncredited)
- Martin Soldat (1966) - Le chef de la Gestapo
- The Saint Lies in Wait (1966) - Schmutz (uncredited)
- La Grande Vadrouille (1966) - Un caporal allemand
- Play Time (1967) - German Businessman
- Street Acquaintances of St. Pauli (1968) - Radebach
- Le franciscain de Bourges (1968) - Basedow
- The Rats (Die Ratten, 1969, TV film) - Herr John
- The Damned (La caduta degli dei, 1969) - Baron Konstantin von Essenbeck
- La Horse (1970) - Hans
- Heintje - Mein bester Freund (1970) - Herr Kleinschmidt
- Atlantic Wall (1970) - Heinrich
- Berlin Affair (1970, TV Movie) - Klauss
- The Seven Headed Lion (1970) - Governor
- Havoc (Das Unheil, 1972) - Pfarrer
- Shadows Unseen (Abuso di potere, 1972) - Chief of Police
- A Time for Loving (1972) - Oberleutnant
- The Revengers (1972) - Zweig
- The Master Touch (Un uomo da rispettare, 1972) - Detective Hoffman
- ... All the Way, Boys! (...più forte ragazzi!, 1972) - Mr. Ears
- A Reason to Live, a Reason to Die (Una ragione per vivere e una per morire, 1972) - Sergente Brent
- Galaxie (1972) - Winkler
- Revolver (1973) - French Lawyer
- The Irony of Chance (1974) - Helmut
- Borsalino & Co. (1974) - Sam
- The Romantic Englishwoman (1975) - Herman
- Operation Daybreak (1975) - Fleischer, Gestapo
- Je t'aime moi non plus (1976) - Boris
- Shout at the Devil (1976) - Herman Fleischer, German Commissioner / Military Commander of Southern Province
- Boomerang (1976) - Le banquier Feldman
- Derrick: Der Mann aus Portofino (1976, TV series episode) - Herr Kremp
- Shir Khofteh (1976)
- The Chinese Miracle (1977) - Flugkapitän
- Abelard (1977)
- Julie pot-de-colle (1977) - Heinzel
- Es muss nicht immer Kaviar sein (1977, TV Series) - Schallenberg
- Soldier of Orange (Soldaat van Oranje, 1977) - Geisman
- The Rider on the White Horse (1978) - Jess Harders
- They Called Him Bulldozer (1978) - Colonel Martin
- Just a Gigolo (1978) - Max, Cillys Agent
- Primel macht ihr Haus verrückt (1980) - Herr Kulicke
- The Rebel (Poliziotto solitudine e rabbia, 1980) - Stoll
- The Formula (1980) - Reimeck
- Kenn' ich, weiß ich, war ich schon! (1981)
- Der König und sein Narr (1981, TV Movie) - von Hermsdorf
- The Winds of War (1983, TV Mini-Series) - Hermann Göring
- Julie Darling (1983) - Lt. Rossmore
- Équateur (1983) - Eugene Schneider
- Man Under Suspicion (Morgen in Alabama, 1984) - Politician
- The Little Drummer Girl (1984) - Inspector
- Palace (1985) - Ferenczy
- High Speed (1986) - Le trafiquant
- Werther (1986)
- Moon over Parador (1988) - Gunther
