= A House Full of Love =

1954 film

- Directed by: Hans Schweikart
- Written by: Ladislas Fodor (play Fräulein Fortuna); Egon Eis; Hans Schweikart
- Produced by: Walter Tjaden
- Starring: Gertrud Kückelmann; Michael Cramer; Erni Mangold
- Cinematography: Willy Goldberger
- Edited by: Renate Knitschke
- Music by: Werner R. Heymann
- Production companies: Bristol-Film Hein Wolff; Wiener Mundus-Film
- Distributed by: Europa-Filmverleih
- Release date: 10 September 1954
- Running time: 83 minutes
- Countries: Austria; West Germany
- Language: German

A House Full of Love (German: Ein Haus voll Liebe) is a 1954 Austrian-West German romantic comedy film directed by Hans Schweikart and starring Gertrud Kückelmann, Michael Cramer and Erni Mangold. It was shot at the Sievering Studios in Vienna. The film's sets were designed by the art director Fritz Jüptner-Jonstorff.

== Cast ==
- Gertrud Kückelmann as Mady
- Michael Cramer as Paul
- Erni Mangold
- Irene Naef as Sybille
- Wilfried Seyferth as Remming
- Peer Schmidt as Billy
- Gunnar Möller as Lutz
- Jane Tilden as Lydia
- Marianne Stopp
- Franz Böheim
- Ulrich Bettac
- Beppo Brem
- Michl Lang
- Rudolf Vogel
- Ernst Waldbrunn
- Hanni Schall

== Bibliography ==
- Rentschler, Eric, ed. (2013). German Film and Literature. Routledge. ISBN 978-1-136-36873-8.
