= Hans Müller (director) =

German film and television director (1909–1977)

Hans Müller (1909-1977) was a German film and television director.

Following a documentary about his hometown Lüdenscheid and recordings for the newsreel, Müller went to Berlin in 1933 and worked at the UFA as an assistant director in over a dozen films, including under the directors Werner Hochbaum and Arthur Maria Rabenalt. In 1944, his first self-directed film, Turmoil of the Hearts, was released by the UFA subsidiary Terra-Filmkunst, starring Lotte Koch, Rudolf Prack and OE Hasse. After the end of the Second World War, when the Berlin studios were largely destroyed, he shot the film And One Day We Will Find Ourselves Again at Altena Castle with Käthe Haack, Paul Dahlke and Lutz Moik, among others.

== Selected filmography ==
- Aufruhr der Herzen (1944)
- And If We Should Meet Again (1947)
- 1-2-3 Corona (1948)
- The Girl from the South Seas (1950)
- Bürgermeister Anna (1950)
- Harbour Melody (1950)
- Poison in the Zoo (1952)
- Shooting Stars (1952)
- Carola Lamberti – Eine vom Zirkus (1954)
- The Czar and the Carpenter (1956)
- Triplets on Board (1959)
- Spedition Marcus (1968, TV series)
- Die Kramer (1969, TV series)
- Butler Parker (1972, TV series, 8 episodes)
