= Carl Braun (bass) =

German opera singer

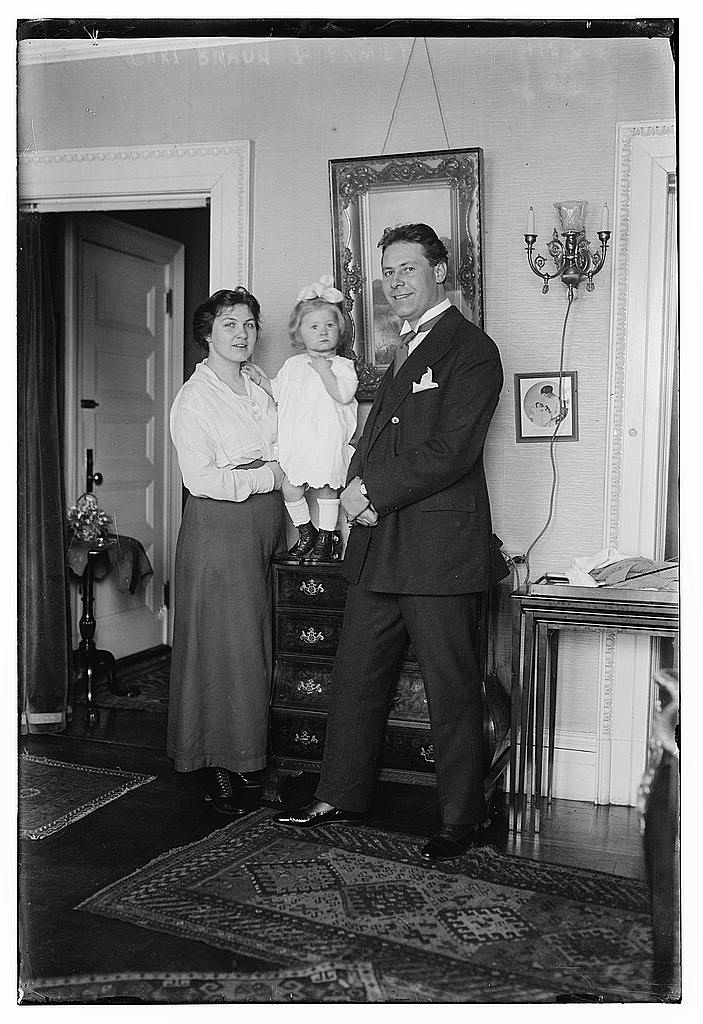
Carl Braun and family in 1917

Carl Braun (2 June 1886, Meisenheim, Hesse-Nassau – 24 April 1960, Hamburg) was a German bass opera singer.

== Biography ==
He was born on 2 June 1886 in Meisenheim, Hesse-Nassau in Germany.

A pupil of the Berlin Imperial Opera, he sang with the Wiesbaden Royal Opera, Vienna Imperial Opera, Berlin City Opera, Metropolitan Opera, and the Berlin State Opera. He was actor Hermann Braun's father, Carl Braun, was an early sympathizer with the Nazis and a member of the anti-semitic Kampfbund für deutsche Kultur,

In 1932, he joined the Nazi Party. He died on 24 April 1960 in Hamburg, Germany.
