= Hitlerjunge Quex (film) =

1933 film directed by Hans Steinhoff

- Directed by: Hans Steinhoff
- Written by: Bobby E. Lüthge
- Screenplay by: Karl Aloys Schenzinger; Baldur von Schirach
- Based on: Der Hitlerjunge Quex by Karl Aloys Schenzinger
- Produced by: Karl Ritter
- Starring: See below
- Cinematography: Konstantin Irmen-Tschet
- Edited by: Milo Harbich
- Music by: Hans-Otto Borgmann
- Production company: UFA
- Distributed by: UFA
- Release date: 19 September 1933
- Running time: 95 minutes 87 minutes (United States)
- Country: Nazi Germany
- Language: German
- Budget: 320,000 RM

Hitlerjunge Quex (Hitler Youth Quex) is a 1933 German film directed by Hans Steinhoff, based on the similarly named 1932 novel Der Hitlerjunge Quex by Karl Aloys Schenzinger. It was released in the United States as Our Flag Leads Us Forward.

== Plot ==
Heini Völker is a teenage boy, living in poverty with his mother and father. Heini's father, a veteran of the Great War, is an out-of-work supporter of the Communist Party. The organizer for the local communist chapter, a man named Stoppel, befriends Heini and invites him to an outing in the country, promising him swimming, camping and games. Heini accepts and duly turns up at the railway station the next day. The Hitler Youth are also there, taking the same train.

When the communists arrive at their own camp, there is only smoking, drinking, and dancing. Boys and girls play games like cards, unlike the games which Heini expected. Heini doesn't feel welcome, and wanders away. In another part of the forest, Heini comes across the Hitler Youth camping by a lake where they are holding a midsummer bonfire. Heini watches them from a distance, but is caught by them, and taken into the camp, but they recognise him as having travelled with the communists, and so they send him away as well. Heini sees them doing all the things in which he hoped to participate, i.e. camping and swimming. He is enamored by their singing. In the morning, Heini watches the Hitler Youth's morning activities, but Stoppel comes looking for him. He hides from Stoppel and instead catches a ride into town from a stranger. When Heini returns home, he tells his mother about the Hitler Youth, and sings one of their songs to her, but his father overhears it and beats him for it.

Heini wants to join the Hitler Youth and visits one of the Hitler Youth members' home, promising to come to the opening of their new club house. However, he arrives late, just as the communists are attacking the Hitler Youth members. Even though he had nothing to do with the attack, he is among those arrested by the police. The police arrest some of the Hitler Youth, but no communists. When the police let him go, he is recognised by the Hitler Youth members, who accuse him of colluding with the communists during the attack.

Stoppel is impressed by the fact that Heini didn't tell the police that the communists were the ones who started the ruckus. He confides in him that the communists plan to attack the Hitler Youth later that day, but Heini is distraught and threatens to tell the Hitler Youth about the attack. He attempts to warn Ulla by telephone, but Fritz dismisses the matter. Heini also informs the police, but they do not believe him either. In the end, Ulla seems to have convinced Fritz to do something, as the communists' weapons store is blown up.

Stoppel realises that Heini must have warned the Hitler Youth, and he goes to Heini's house and hints to his mother that he is going to kill him. However, later Stoppel has a change of heart and orders the communists not to retaliate against Heini. Heini's mother is so distraught that she decides to kill her son and herself by shutting the windows and leaving the gas on in their apartment at night. She is killed, but Heini survives.

Heini's father happens to meet Heini's Hitler Youth troop leader, Kass, when both men go to see Heini at the hospital. It is here that Heini's father reveals that he was injured in the war, and that that is the reason he could not work. Kass attempts to convince Heini's father to join the Nazis. Heini decides to move into a hostel run by the Hitler Youth, where he discovers to his dismay that not all members of Hitler Youth have such high moral values as he had thought. They call him Quex, originally as an insult, a shortening of "Quecksilber" (quicksilver).

The Hitler Youth leader takes care not to send Heini to the district where the communists live, but they find out where he is staying. Stoppel seeks Heini out on the street, and tries to convince him to return to the communists. Heini refuses, and Stoppel warns him not to return to the communist district. One day, one of the Hitler Youth is beaten up by the communists while putting up posters, and Heini convinces his leader to allow him to visit the communist district to hand out flyers. However, his fellow Hitler Youth Grundler has been taken in by the communist girl Gerda, and throws all the flyers in the river. Heini then offers to reprint all the posters during the night and puts up the posters before the morning. The communists hear about this and chase him and stab him. The Hitler Youth find him lying face-down dying.

== Cast ==
- Jürgen Ohlsen (Note: Credited as Ein Hitlerjunge) as Heini Völker
- Heinrich George as Vater Völker
- Berta Drews as Mutter Völker
- Claus Clausen as Bannführer Kaß (Brigade Leader Kass)
- Franz Ramspott (Note: Credited as Ein Hitlerjunge) as Fritz Dörries (comradeship leader)
- Helga Bodemer (Note: Credited as Ein Hitlermädchen) as Ulla Dörries
- Rotraut Richter as Gerda
- Hermann Speelmans as Stoppel
- Hans Richter as Franz
- Ernst Behmer as Kowalski
- Hansjoachim Büttner as Arzt (doctor)
- Franziska Kinz as Krankenschwester (nurse)
- Hermann Braun (Note: Credited as Ein Hitlerjunge) as Grundler
- Rudolf Platte as Moritatensänger (carnival singer)
- Reinhold Bernt as Ausrufer (barker)
- Hans Deppe as Althändler (furniture dealer)
- Anna Müller-Lincke as Eine Nachbarin Völkers (Völkers' neighbour)
- Karl Meixner as Wilde
- Karl Hannemann as Lebensmittelhändler (grocer)
- Ernst Rotmund as Revierwachtmeister (desk sergeant)
- Hans Otto Stern as Kneipenwirt (bartender)

== Soundtrack ==
- "Unsere Fahne flattert uns voran" (music by Hans-Otto Borgmann, lyrics by Baldur von Schirach)
- Sung several times by the communists: "The Internationale" (written by Eugène Pottier and Pierre Degeyter)
- Sung on the camping trip of the communists and later by a Hitler Youth: "Das ist die Liebe der Matrosen" (written by Werner R. Heymann and Robert Gilbert)

== Production ==
Bobby E. Lüthge and Karl Aloys Schenzinger wrote a script based on Schenzinger's Der Hitlerjunge Quex, a novel about Herbert Norkus that sold over 190,000 copies. The film was produced by Universum Film AG. The production was overseen by Baldur von Schirach, the leader of the Hitler Youth, and filming was done in Neubabelsberg.

Produced by Karl Ritter, it was supported by the Nazi leadership and produced for 225,000–320,000 RM (equivalent to €1,042,986–€1,483,357 in 2021). The latter also wrote the lyrics for the Hitler Youth marching song "Vorwärts! Vorwärts! schmettern die hellen Fanfaren", better known by its refrain, Unsere Fahne flattert uns voran, using an existing melody by Hans-Otto Borgmann, who was also responsible for the music. The director was Hans Steinhoff. For the film, the subtitle Ein Film vom Opfergeist der deutschen Jugend ("A film about the sacrificial spirit of German youth") was added to the novel's title. It was one of three films about Nazi martyrs in 1933, the other two being SA-Mann Brand and Hans Westmar.

== Themes ==
The character of Wilde was played by Karl Meixner, of whom Jay Baird said that he looked like "a Nazi version of the incarnation of the 'Jewish-Bolshevik' will to destruction".

The film allows some sympathy for communists. Heini's father, though violent and drunk, has become a communist because of his, and the workers', desperate condition. In one scene, his argument for his son being with him revolves around his sufferings in the war and his unemployment. Stoppel, the communist who invited Heini to a Communist Youth outing, while saying that he has to be eliminated, takes no part in the killing, Quex having made a strong impression on him.

== Release ==
Hitlerjunge Quex was approved by the censors on 7 September 1933, presented to Hitler at the Ufa-Phoebus Palace in Munich on 12 September, and premiered at the Ufa-Palast am Zoo in Berlin on 19 September. Thousands of Hitler Youth members lined the streets during the Munich showing. Rudolf Hess, Joseph Goebbels, Hermann Göring, Robert Ley, Ernst Röhm, and other high Nazi functionaries also attended the Munich showing.

It was premiered in the United States as Our Flag Leads Us Forward at the Yorkville Theatre on the Upper East Side of Manhattan on 6 July 1934 and in March 1942 in Paris as Le jeune hitlérien. Over 20 million people saw the film and it was still being shown at the Hitler Youth's jugendfilmstunden by 1942.

The film was shown in a double bill with Leni Riefenstahl's Nazi propaganda film Triumph of the Will at the Olympia Theatre in Dublin, Ireland on 27 October 1935. The event was organised by the German Legation and was attended by about 200 people. The Garda Síochána (Irish police) feared the screening would be disrupted by communists and provided heavy protection inside and outside the theatre. They noted the attendance of Senator Joseph Connolly who was an Irish government minister, as well as diplomats from Belgium, France, Germany, and Poland.

== Reception ==
Goebbels reflected on the film as follows: "If Hitler Youth Quex represents the first large-scale attempt to depict the ideas and world of National Socialism with the art of cinema, then one must say that this attempt, given the possibilities of modern technology, is a full-fledged success." By January 1934 it had been viewed by a million people. It was banned in Germany after World War II.

== See also ==
- List of German films 1919-1933
- List of German films 1933-1945
- Nazism and cinema

== Works cited ==
- Baird, Jay (1983). "From Berlin to Neubabelsberg: Nazi Film Propaganda and Hitler Youth Quex". Journal of Contemporary History. 18 (3). SAGE Publishing: 495–515. doi:10.1177/002200948301800307. JSTOR 260548.
- Waldman, Harry (2008). Nazi Films In America, 1933-1942. McFarland & Company. ISBN 9780786438617.
- Welch, David (1983). Propaganda and the German Cinema: 1933-1945. I.B. Tauris. ISBN 9781860645204.
