= Rotraut Richter =

German actress (1915–1947)

- Born: 15 May 1915; Wünsdorf, Brandenburg, Prussia, German Empire
- Died: 1 October 1947 (aged 32); Berlin, Germany
- Occupation: Actress
- Years active: 1932–1947 (film)

Rotraut Richter (15 May 1915 – 1 October 1947) was a German stage and film actress. She appeared in the role of Gerda in the 1933 Nazi propaganda film Hitlerjunge Quex, receiving a letter of thanks from Joseph Goebbels along with the rest of the cast.

== Selected filmography ==
- The First Right of the Child (1932)
- Hitlerjunge Quex (1933)
- Honour Among Thieves (1933)
- The Sporck Battalion (1934)
- Don't Lose Heart, Suzanne! (1935)
- Fruit in the Neighbour's Garden (1935)
- Trouble Backstairs (1935)
- The Violet of Potsdamer Platz (1936)
- Meiseken (1937)
- The Beaver Coat (1937)
- Somewhere in Berlin (1946)
- Wozzeck (1947)

== Bibliography ==
- Kreimeier, Klaus. The Ufa Story: A History of Germany's Greatest Film Company, 1918–1945. University of California Press, 1999.
