= Der Kahn der fröhlichen Leute =

1950 film

- Directed by: Hans Heinrich
- Written by: Jochen Klepper
- Produced by: Adolf Hannemann
- Starring: Petra Peters
- Release date: 17 February 1950
- Running time: 89 minutes
- Country: East Germany
- Language: German

Der Kahn der fröhlichen Leute is an East German film directed by Hans Heinrich. It was released in 1950, and sold more than 4,100,000 tickets.

== Cast ==
- Petra Peters as Marianne Butenschön
- Fritz Wagner as Michael Staude
- Joachim Brennecke as Hans
- Paul Esser as Heinrich
- Werner Peters as Hugo
- Alfred Maack as August
- Maly Delschaft as Emmi Gutwein
- Herbert Kiper as Otto Woitasch
- Inge van der Straaten as Anna Woitasch
- Albert Venohr as Paul Zinke
- Joachim Lupa as Fritz Zinke
- Gustav Püttjer as Jimmy Krause
- Hans Emons as Menz
