= Hansel and Gretel (1954 Janssen film) =

1954 film

Hänsel und Gretel
- Directed by: Walter Janssen
- Written by: Gerhard F. Hummel
- Produced by: Hubert Schonger
- Starring: Jürgen Micksch; Maren-Inken Bielenberg; Jochen Diestelmann; Ellen Frank; Barbara Gallauner; Wolfgang Eichberger
- Narrated by: Paul Tripp (1965-English)
- Music by: Giuseppe Becce
- Release date: 12 September 1954 (West Germany)
- Running time: 54 min.
- Country: West Germany
- Language: German

Hansel and Gretel (German: Hänsel und Gretel) is a 1954 German film, directed by Walter Janssen, based on the story of Hansel and Gretel by the Brothers Grimm. It should not be confused with either Hansel and Gretel, another German film, or an American film Hansel and Gretel, both of which were released in the same year.

== Cast ==
- Jürgen Micksch – Hansel
- Maren-Inken Bielenberg – Gretel
- Jochen Diestelmann – The Father
- Ellen Frank – The Mother
- Barbara Gallauner – The Evil Witch

== DVD release ==
In 2007, Hänsel und Gretel was released on DVD in Germany. The film was also part of a five DVD boxset, which contained other classic live-action German fairytale films made in the 1950s.

== See also ==
- List of films about witchcraft
