= Renée Stobrawa =

German screenwriter and actress

Renée Stobrawa (born Renate Stobrawa; 13 October 1897 in Dresden – 16 August 1971 in Tegernsee) was a German screenwriter and film actress.

== Partial filmography ==
- The Mistress and her Servant (1929) - Frau Matjunke
- Melody of the World (1929, Short, Documentary) - sailor's wife
- Kennst Du das Land (1931) - Theresa
- Hell on Earth (1931) - Frau Kohler
- Cruiser Emden (1932) - Grete
- Victoria in Dover (1936) - Baroness Lehzen
- Dangerous Game (1937) - Natalie
- The Beaver Coat (1937) - Almine Wulkow
- The Muzzle (1938) - Billa, Dienstmädchen
- Skandal um den Hahn (1938) - Frau Lebrecht
- The False Step (1939) - Roswitha
- Salonwagen E 417 (1939) - Freundin des Kompagnons
- Hochzeit mit Hindernissen (1939) - Lotte Jähnisch, Näherin
- The Sensational Casilla Trial (1939) - Fräulein Baumann
- A Woman Like You (1939) - Frau Haucke
- Der Stammbaum des Dr. Pistorius (1939) - Käthe, Giesekings Frau
- Verwandte sind auch Menschen (1940) - Erna Schramm
- Kopf hoch, Johannes! (1941) - Mutter Panse
- An Old Heart Becomes Young Again (1943) - Frau Wendisch
- The Buchholz Family (1944) - Adelheid Hampel
- Marriage of Affection (1944) - Adelheid Hampel
- The Degenhardts (1944)
- Wo ist Herr Belling? (1945) - Frau Dr. Lemke
- Blum Affair (1948) - Frieda Bremer
- Girls Behind Bars (1949) - Frau Liebhold
- Das kalte Herz (1950)
- Little Red Riding Hood (1953) - Mutter
- Hansel and Gretel (1954) - Frau Köper
- Mother Holly (1954) - Frau Holle
- Der Struwwelpeter (1955) - Konrads Mama
- Ina, Peter und die Rasselbande (1955) - Frau Schubert
- Cinderella (1955) - Gute Fee / Fairy Godmother
- Dornröschen (1955)
- Tischlein, deck dich (1956) - Kathy's aunt
- Kalle wird Bürgermeister (1957)
- The Goose Girl (1957) - Königin-Mutter
- Rumpelstilzchen (1960) - Weide
