= The Beaver Coat =

1893 satirical play

The Beaver Coat (German: Der Biberpelz) is a satirical play by Gerhart Hauptmann premiered in Berlin in 1893.

The work is an example of a German naturalistic Diebskomödie, or 'thief's comedy'. The drama takes place "somewhere in Berlin... around the end of the eighties" (referring to the 1880s). In line with Naturalistic principles of the use of everyday speech forms, a large number of the characters speak in a Berlin dialect.

== Plot ==
Mother Wolff is a rather resolute cleaning lady. She is married to a somewhat clumsy and timid ship carpenter by the name of Julius Wolff. The story begins as she comes home with an illegally poached roebuck, where her daughter Leontine is waiting for her. Leontine has fled her service to the pensioner Krüger because she was told in the late hours of the night to bring a pile of wood into the stable. Mother Wolff, constantly considerate of her own reputation, wants to send her daughter back. But as she learns that the work concerns a "beautiful dry club", she allows Leontine to stay the night with the intention of acquiring the wood herself.

While she sells the roebuck that she claims she discovered dead to a sailor on the river Spree named Wulkow, her youngest daughter Adelheid explains that Mr. Krüger was recently given a valuable beaver coat from his wife. Wulkow then exclaims that he would without question pay sixty Taler for such a fur coat. Mother Wolff quickly realises that with this sum of money she could pay off a large part of her debt. She thus decides to steal the coat in order to sell it to Wulkow.

After the theft, Krüger reports to the police that his wood and his coat have been stolen. However, the head official von Wehrhahn feels only annoyed by this complaint. He is only interested in uncovering, "sinister people and elements that are politically outlawed or hostile to the crown or aristocracy." Given this, Krüger strives to have the private tutor Dr. Fleischer arrested for Lèse majesté. The doctor receives around twenty various newspapers and meets regularly with free thinking literary figures.

Although the head official has on several occasions not given any attention to Krüger, he decides to come once again in order to carry out his plan. This time, however, Mother Wolff is also present. She cleverly wards off any suspicion towards her, however. The comedy ends without the theft ever being solved.

In his tragicomedy The Conflagration (German: Der rote Hahn), which was first performed in 1901, Hauptmann continues several themes prominent in The Beaver Coat.
