= Fritz Genschow =

German actor, film director and screenwriter

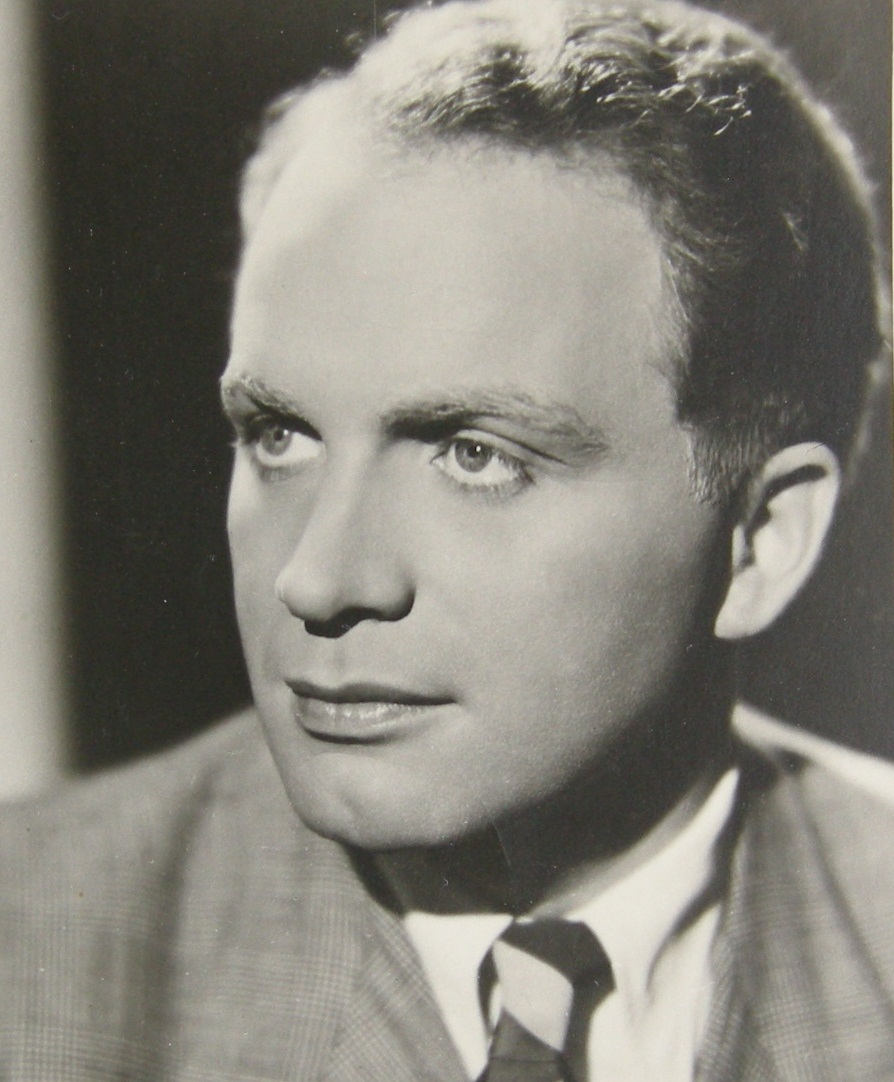
Fritz Genschow

Fritz Genschow (15 May 1905 – 21 June 1977) was a German actor, film director and screenwriter.

== Selected filmography ==
- Hands Up, Eddy Polo (1929) - Russenphilipp
- Beyond the Street (1929) - Der Arbeitsloser / The Unemployed man
- Inherited Passions (1929) - Ottokar Kiekebusch
- Kennst Du das Land (1931) - Silvano
- Gesangverein Sorgenfrei (1931) - Fritz
- Morgenrot (1933) - Oberleutnant 'Phipps' Fredericks
- Refugees (1933) - Hermann
- At the End of the World (1934) - Le sibérien
- The Sporck Battalion (1934) - Leutnant v. Naugaard
- Holiday From Myself (1934) - Erich Bürger, Büroangestellter
- Hundred Days (1935) - Lucien
- Joan of Arc (1935) - Hauptmann
- Eine Seefahrt, die ist lustig (1935) - Fritz Schmitz
- The Student of Prague (1935) - Dahl
- Hangmen, Women and Soldiers (1935) - Buschke
- Die Entführung (1936) - Bobby Biscot
- Die letzte Fahrt der Santa Margareta (1936) - Zollkapitän Holt
- Street Music (1936) - Hans Lünk - Straßenmusikant
- Eine Nacht mit Hindernissen (1937) - Rolf Eltze - Erster Offizier der 'Nymphe'
- Dangerous Crossing (1937) - Fritz Buchholz - U-Bahn-Beamter
- Talking About Jacqueline (1937) - Lionel Clark
- Wie der Hase läuft (1937) - Gustav Hase, Bahnhofsvorsteher
- An Enemy of the People (1937) - Kapitän Holster
- Geld fällt vom Himmel (1938) - Gusdav Pasemann
- Dreizehn Mann und eine Kanone (1938)
- Drei Unteroffiziere (1939) - Unteroffizier Fritz Kohlhammer
- Roman eines Arztes (1939) - Schofför Dr. Üdings
- Sommer, Sonne, Erika (1939) - Fritz Brochet
- Ursula Under Suspicion (1939) - Gutsinspektor Arndt
- Rote Mühle (1940)
- Twilight (1940) - Forstmeister Jürgens
- Left of the Isar, Right of the Spree (1940) - Alfred Schulze
- Friedrich Schiller – The Triumph of a Genius (1940) - Student Kapff
- A Flea in Her Ear (1943) - Großknecht Karl Lührmann
- Titanic (1943) - Landarbeiter Henry (uncredited)
- So ein Affentheater (1953)
- Little Red Riding Hood (1953) - Jäger
- Hänsel und Gretel (1954)
- Struwwelpeter (1955, director, based on Struwwelpeter) - Erzähler
- Ina, Peter und die Rasselbande (1955) - Tobbi
- The Priest from Kirchfeld (1955) - Franz Wagner, Eisenbahner
- Cinderella (1955) - Der Vater / Father
- Sleeping Beauty (1955) - König
- The Wishing-Table (1956) - Woodworker
- Kalle wird Bürgermeister (1957)
- Die Gänsemagd (1957)
- Schneewittchen (1959) - (final film role)
