= Werner Stock =

German actor

- Born: Werner Bruno Wilhelm Hermann Stock; 20 October 1903; Sangerhausen, German Empire
- Died: 30 April 1972 (aged 68); West Berlin, West Germany
- Occupation: Actor
- Years active: 1932–1971

Werner Bruno Wilhelm Hermann Stock (20 October 1903 – 30 April 1972) was a German actor. He appeared in more than 130 films and television shows between 1932 and 1971.

== Selected filmography ==
- Spoiling the Game (1932)
- Decoy (1934)
- The Royal Waltz (1935)
- The Court Concert (1936)
- Paul and Pauline (1936)
- Hilde and the Volkswagen (1936)
- Land of Love (1937)
- Men Without a Fatherland (1937)
- Tango Notturno (1937)
- Madame Bovary (1937)
- A Prussian Love Story (1938)
- Dance on the Volcano (1938)
- The Girl at the Reception (1940)
- The Swedish Nightingale (1941)
- Clarissa (1941)
- Six Days of Leave (1941)
- Two in a Big City (1942)
- Melody of a Great City (1943)
- The Buchholz Family (1944)
- Marriage of Affection (1944)
- Peter Voss, Thief of Millions (1946)
- The Court Concert (1948)
- The Beautiful Galatea (1950)
- Torreani (1951)
- When the Heath Dreams at Night (1952)
- Christina (1953)
- Everything for Father (1953)
- The Silent Angel (1954)
- As Long as You Live (1955)
- The Dark Star (1955)
- The Rose of Stamboul (1953)
- The Wishing-Table (1956)
- The Glass Tower (1957)
- Lilli (1958)
- Freddy, the Guitar and the Sea (1959)
- Rommel Calls Cairo (1959)
- The Merry War of Captain Pedro (1959)
- Freddy and the Melody of the Night (1960)
- We Will Never Part (1960)
- Always Trouble with the Bed (1961)
- The Sky Is Blue (1964, TV film)
- Twenty Girls and the Teachers (1971)
