= Gerhard Huttula =

- Born: 6 June 1902; Berlin, German Empire
- Died: 15 January 1996 (aged 93); Berlin, Germany
- Other name: Gerardo Huttula
- Occupations: Director, Cinematographer

Gerhard Huttula (1902–1996) was a German cinematographer and film director. Huttula was known for his skill at special effects. During the Nazi era he shot a number of ethnographic documentaries and travelogues. He worked for a while in Argentina where he was credited as Gerardo Huttula.

== Selected filmography ==
=== Cinematographer ===
- Outside the Law (1937)

=== Special effects ===
- Friedemann Bach (1941)
- The Great Love (1942)
- Diesel (1942)
- Kolberg (1945)

== Bibliography ==
- Newton, Ronald C. The "Nazi Menace" in Argentina, 1931-1947. Stanford University Press, 1992.
