= List of German films of 1936 =

This is a list of the most notable films produced in the Cinema of Germany in 1936.

== A–L ==
Title	Director	Cast	Genre	Notes
The Abduction of the Sabine Women	Robert A. Stemmle	Max Gülstorff, Hilde Sessak, Ilse Petri	Comedy	
The Accusing Song	Georg Zoch	Louis Graveure, Gina Falckenberg, Walter Rilla	Drama	
Across the Desert	Johann Alexander Hübler-Kahla	Aruth Wartan, Franz Klebusch, Bertold Reissig	Adventure	
The Adventurer of Paris	Karlheinz Martin	Karin Hardt, Hannes Stelzer, Hilde von Stolz	Romance	
Augustus the Strong	Paul Wegener	Michael Bohnen, Lil Dagover, Marieluise Claudius	Historical	Co-production with Poland
Back in the Country	Carl Boese	Hilde Weissner, Hans Stüwe, Hermann Speelmans	Drama	
The Bashful Casanova	Karel Lamac	Paul Kemp, Fita Benkhoff, Charlott Daudert	Comedy	
The Beggar Student	Georg Jacoby	Marika Rökk, Fritz Kampers, Carola Höhn	Musical	
Boccaccio	Herbert Maisch	Gina Falckenberg, Willy Fritsch, Albrecht Schoenhals	Historical	
The Cabbie's Song	E.W. Emo	Paul Hörbiger, Gusti Huber, Erika Dannhoff	Historical	
The Call of the Jungle	Harry Piel	Harry Piel, Ursula Grabley, Gerda Maurus	Adventure	
The Castle in Flanders	Géza von Bolváry	Mártha Eggerth, Paul Hartmann, Hilde Weissner	Drama	
City of Anatol	Viktor Tourjansky	Gustav Fröhlich, Brigitte Horney, Rose Stradner	Drama	
The Court Concert	Douglas Sirk	Mártha Eggerth, Johannes Heesters, Kurt Meisel	Romantic comedy	
The Czar's Courier	Richard Eichberg	Anton Walbrook, Lucie Höflich, Maria Andergast	Historical	
Dinner Is Served	Hans H. Zerlett	Herbert Hübner, Gertrud de Lalsky, Hertha Guthmar	Comedy	
Doctor Engel	Johannes Riemann	Paul Hörbiger, Viktoria von Ballasko, Hans Leibelt	Comedy drama	
A Doctor of Conviction	Hans H. Zerlett	Albrecht Schoenhals, Karin Hardt, Gerda Maurus	Drama	
The Dreamer	Carl Froelich	Emil Jannings, Hilde Weissner, Harald Paulsen	Drama	
The Empress's Favourite	Werner Hochbaum	Olga Chekhova, Anton Pointner, Heinz von Cleve	Historical	
Escapade	Erich Waschneck	Renate Müller, Georg Alexander, Grethe Weiser	Comedy	
Family Parade	Fritz Wendhausen	Ernst Dumcke, Curd Jürgens, Walter Janssen	Comedy	
Ferryman Maria	Frank Wisbar	Sybille Schmitz, Peter Voß, Karl Platen	Horror	
Forget Me Not	Zoltan Korda	Beniamino Gigli, Joan Gardner, Jeanne Stuart	Drama	Co-production with United Kingdom
Game on Board	Herbert Selpin	Viktor de Kowa, Susi Lanner, Carsta Löck	Crime comedy	
The Girl Irene	Reinhold Schünzel	Lil Dagover, Sabine Peters, Geraldine Katt	Drama	
Girls in White	Victor Janson	Maria Cebotari, Iván Petrovich, Hilde von Stolz	Musical	
The Haunted Castle	Max Obal	Walter Steinbeck, Carola Höhn, Hans Stüwe	Mystery	
Hilde and the Volkswagen	Heinz Paul	Ludwig Manfred Lommel, Grethe Weiser, Hilde Schneider	Comedy	
A Hoax	E.W. Emo	Paul Hörbiger, Trude Marlen, Hans Moser	Comedy	
Home Guardsman Bruggler	Werner Klingler	Franziska Kinz, Rolf Pinegger, Eduard Köck	War	
The Hour of Temptation	Paul Wegener	Gustav Fröhlich, Lída Baarová, Harald Paulsen	Mystery	
The Hunter of Fall	Hans Deppe	Paul Richter, Rolf Pinegger, Hans Adalbert Schlettow	Drama	
If We All Were Angels	Carl Froelich	Heinz Ruhmann, Leny Marenbach, Lotte Rausch	Comedy	
The Impossible Woman	Johannes Meyer	Dorothea Wieck, Gustav Fröhlich, Gina Falckenberg	Romance	
Intermezzo	Josef von Báky	Tresi Rudolph, Albrecht Schoenhals, Franz Weber	Musical comedy	
The Kaiser of California	Luis Trenker	Luis Trenker, Viktoria von Ballasko, Elise Aulinger	Western	
The Last Four on Santa Cruz	Werner Klingler	Hermann Speelmans, Irene von Meyendorff, Valéry Inkijinoff	Drama	
The Love of the Maharaja	Arthur Maria Rabenalt	Gustav Diessl, Hilde von Stolz, Isa Miranda	Drama	
Love's Awakening	Herbert Maisch	Eugen Klöpfer, Karin Hardt, Walter Rilla	Drama	
Lucky Kids	Paul Martin	Lilian Harvey, Willy Fritsch, Paul Kemp	Comedy	

== M–Z ==
Title	Director	Cast	Genre	Notes
Maria the Maid	Veit Harlan	Hilde Körber, Hilde Hildebrand, Alfred Abel	Drama	
Martha	Karl Anton	Hanna Ralph, Georg Alexander, Fritz Kampers	Musical	
The Merry Wives	Carl Hoffmann	Magda Schneider, Leo Slezak, Ida Wüst	Comedy	
Moscow-Shanghai	Paul Wegener	Pola Negri, Gustav Diessl, Susi Lanner	Drama	
Ninety Minute Stopover	Harry Piel	Harry Piel, Else von Möllendorff, Alexander Golling	Thriller	
The Night With the Emperor	Erich Engel	Jenny Jugo, Richard Romanowsky, Hans Zesch-Ballot	Comedy	
Orders Are Orders	Alwin Elling	Weiss Ferdl, Trude Hesterberg, Eric Helgar	Comedy	
Paul and Pauline	Heinz Paul	Ludwig Manfred Lommel, Trude Hesterberg, Erika Helmke	Comedy	
Port Arthur	Nicolas Farkas	Anton Walbrook, Karin Hardt, René Deltgen	Drama	Co-production with France
Savoy Hotel 217	Gustav Ucicky	Hans Albers, Brigitte Horney, René Deltgen	Drama	
Scandal at the Fledermaus	Herbert Selpin	Viktor de Kowa, Maria Andergast, Adele Sandrock	Comedy	
Stjenka Rasin	Alexandre Volkoff	Wera Engels, Hans Adalbert Schlettow, Heinrich George	Drama	
A Strange Guest	Gerhard Lamprecht	Alfred Abel, Ilse Petri, Annemarie Steinsieck	Drama	
Street Music	Hans Deppe	Jessie Vihrog, Fritz Genschow, Hans Deppe	Comedy	
Stronger Than Regulations	Jürgen von Alten	Paul Hartmann, Manja Behrens, Karl Hellmer	Mystery	
Susanne in the Bath	Jürgen von Alten	Manja Behrens, Max Gülstorff, Ursula Herking	Comedy	
There Were Two Bachelors	Franz Seitz	Joe Stöckel, Adolf Gondrell, Manfred Koempel-Pilot	Comedy	
The Three Around Christine	Hans Deppe	Maria Andergast, Hans Söhnker, Fritz Kampers	Comedy	
Three Girls for Schubert	E.W. Emo	Paul Hörbiger, Maria Andergast, Gretl Theimer	Historical	
Thunder, Lightning and Sunshine	Erich Engels	Karl Valentin, Liesl Karlstadt, Ilse Petri	Comedy	
Tomfoolery	Willi Forst	Renate Müller, Jenny Jugo, Anton Walbrook	Comedy	
Uncle Bräsig	Erich Waschneck	Otto Wernicke, Heinrich Schroth, Elga Brink	Comedy	
Under Blazing Heavens	Gustav Ucicky	Hans Albers, Lotte Lang, René Deltgen	Adventure	
The Unknown	Frank Wisbar	Sybille Schmitz, Jean Galland, Edwin Jürgensen	Drama	
The Unsuspecting Angel	Franz Seitz	Joe Stöckel, Lucie Englisch, Erika Glässner	Comedy crime	
Victoria in Dover	Erich Engel	Jenny Jugo, Olga Limburg, Renée Stobrawa	Romantic comedy	
The Violet of Potsdamer Platz	Johann Alexander Hübler-Kahla	Rotraut Richter, Margarete Kupfer, Else Elster	Drama	
A Wedding Dream	Erich Engel	Ida Wüst, Inge List, Ferdinand Marian	Comedy	
When the Cock Crows	Carl Froelich	Heinrich George, Marianne Hoppe, Hans Brausewetter	Comedy	
Where the Lark Sings	Carl Lamac	Mártha Eggerth, Alfred Neugebauer, Lucie Englisch	Musical	Co-production with Hungary and Switzerland
Winter in the Woods	Fritz Peter Buch	Viktor Staal, Hansi Knoteck, Hans Zesch-Ballot	Drama	
A Woman of No Importance	Hans Steinhoff	Gustaf Gründgens, Käthe Dorsch, Marianne Hoppe	Drama	
Women's Regiment	Karl Ritter	Heli Finkenzeller, Erika von Thellmann, Oskar Sima	Comedy	

== Documentaries ==
Title	Director	Cast	Genre	Notes
Auf großer Fahrt	Hans Adlerstein		documentary	
Bauernhochzeit am Tegernsee	Norman Dix		documentary	
Bremen	Otto von Bothmer		documentary	
Deutsche Vergangenheit wird lebendig	Johannes Guter		documentary	
Düsseldorf	Walter Ruttmann		documentary	
Ein Almbrunnen wird gebaut	Hans Ammann		documentary	
Erbkrank	Herbert Gerdes		Propaganda	Euthanasia propaganda film
Ewiger Wald			documentary	
Ewige Wache			documentary	
Der Fuehrer besichtigt die Leibstandarte - Auszug vom Reichsparteitag				Available at Internet Archive
Für Ehre, Freiheit, Frieden - Zeppeline im Wahlkampf	Richard Quaas, Hermann Stöß		documentary	
Das grosse Eis	Paul Kunhenn, Svend Noldan, Else Wegener		documentary	
Große Stadt im engen Tal	Ulrich Kayser		documentary	
Hatikvah	Georg Engel		documentary	
Die Heimat im Lied	Johannes Guter		documentary	
Hinein!	Gösta Nordhaus		documentary	
Im Trommelfeuer der Westfront	Charles Willy Kayser		documentary	
Jungbann 2	Alfred Weidenmann		documentary	
Jugend der Welt. Der Film von den IV. Olympischen Winterspielen in Garmisch-Partenkirchen	Herbert Brieger, Carl Junghans		Documentary	1936 Winter Olympics
Kampf um Brot	Ulrich Kayser		documentary	
Kaufmann, nicht Händler	Ernst Kochel		partly animated Documentary	propaganda film Available online here
Kopfjäger von Borneo	Baron Victor von Plessen		Documentary	Headhunters of Borneo; German-Dutch co-production
Lebende Werkzeuge	Hans Wilhelm		documentary	
Mädel im Landjahr	Hans Cürlis		documentary	
Nanga Parbat	Frank Leberecht		documentary	
Reichsparteitag der Ehre				Available at Internet Archive
Ruf in die Welt	Ulrich Kayser		documentary	
Schiff in Not	Walter Ruttmann		documentary	
Sport und Soldaten	Hans Wilhelm		documentary	
Die Stadt der sieben Türme	Johannes Guter		documentary	
Unser Brot, Arbeit und Wehr			documentary	
Wintersonnenwende	Gerhard Huttula		documentary	
Zwischen Sahara und Nürburgring	Wolfgang Staudte		documentary	

== Shorts ==
Title	Director	Cast	Genre	Notes
Der blaue Punkt	Wolfgang Kaskeline		animation	
Bommerli	Richard Groschopp		animation	
Eine kleine Königstragödie	Richard Groschopp		animation	
En fargesymfoni i blått			animation	Co-production with Norway
Graf Habenichts	Kurt Stordel		animation	
Puss in Boots	Lotte Reiniger		animation	
Silhouetten	Lotte Reiniger, Walter Reisch		Animation	Animated feature film
Das Schönheitsfleckchen	Carl Froelich, Rolf Hansen			The Beauty Mark in Opticolor
Tischlein deck dich	Ferdinand Diehl		animation	
Vier Asse	George Pal		Animation	Four Aces
Zum Greifen nah				Almost Close Enough to Touch, experimental 3-D film
