= Wolfgang Staudte =

German film director (1906–1984)

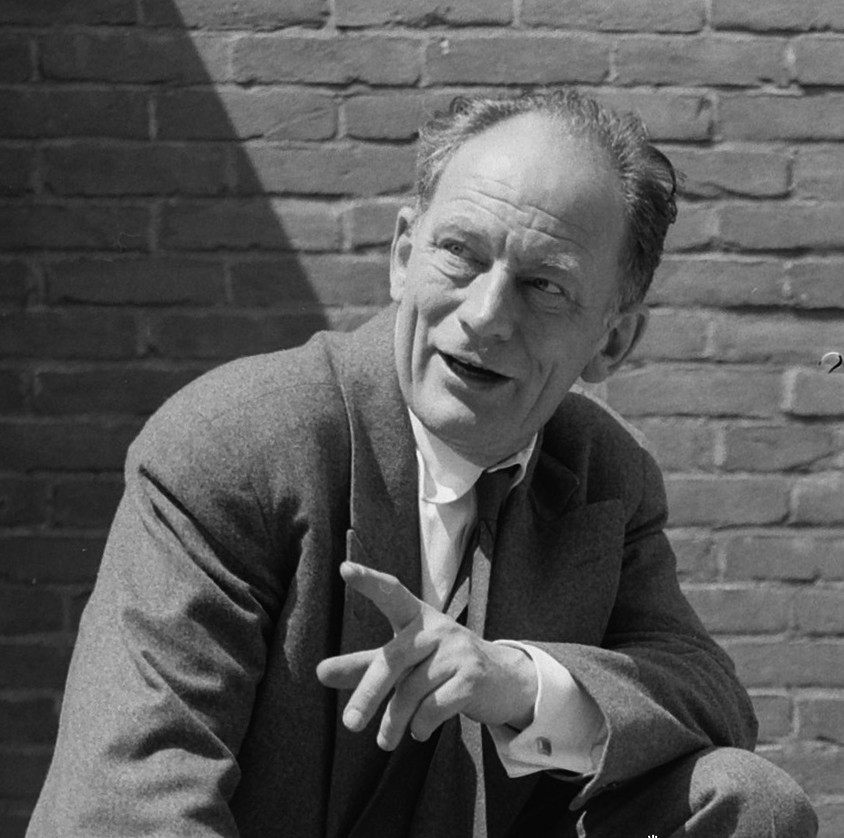
- Born: Georg Friedrich Staudte; 9 October 1906; Saarbrücken, German Empire
- Died: 19 January 1984 (aged 77); SR Slovenia, SFR Yugoslavia
- Occupations: Film director, Screenwriter, Actor
- Years active: 1932–1969

Wolfgang Staudte (9 October 1906 – 19 January 1984), born Georg Friedrich Staudte, was a German film director, script writer and actor. He was born in Saarbrücken.

After 1945, Staudte also looked at German guilt in the cinema. Alongside Helmut Käutner, he was considered the only German post-war director of any standing who, after 1945, could look back on continuous artistic filmmaking far removed from Heimatfilm and the suppression of history. Staudte's films stood for politically committed cinema as well as for professional craftsmanship, for film art and (good) entertainment with a social claim.

His most important work came in the ten years following World War II, in which he worked with the DEFA in East Germany. The main focus of his work was to highlight the limits of German national pride. His work in anti-Nazi films, such as The Murderers Are Among Us (1946), was also a personal working-through of his film career under the Nazis (he acted in the antisemitic film Jud Süß). Following 1956, he worked in West Germany. By the 1970s, his work was no longer considered particularly modern and he moved to television. He appeared on shows such as Der Kommissar and Tatort.

He is the great-uncle of the German-Iranian director and novelist Andy Siege.

== Filmography ==
=== As director ===
Film

- Bravo Acrobat! (1943)
- Ich hab' von dir geträumt (1944) — based on a story by Johann von Vásáry
- Der Mann, dem man den Namen stahl (1944, lost film, rediscovered 1996)
- The Murderers Are Among Us (1946)
- The Adventures of Fridolin (1948) — remake of the lost film Der Mann, dem man den Namen stahl
- Rotation (1949)
- Second Hand Destiny (1949)
- A Tale of Five Cities (1951, anthology film)
- Der Untertan (1951) — based on the novel Der Untertan by Heinrich Mann
- Poison in the Zoo (directed by Hans Müller, 1952)
- Das Mädchen Juanita (premiere: 1952, Überläufer from 1945)
- Die Geschichte vom kleinen Muck (1953) — based on the fairy tale Little Muck by Wilhelm Hauff
- Leuchtfeuer (1954)
- Ciske de Rat (Dutch-language, 1955) — based on the novel Ciske de Rat by Piet Bakker
  - Ciske – ein Kind braucht Liebe (German-language, 1955) — based on the novel Ciske de Rat by Piet Bakker
- Mutter Courage und ihre Kinder (Verfilmung) (1955, unfinished film) — based on Brecht's Mother Courage and Her Children
- Rose Bernd (1957) — based on Rose Bernd by Gerhart Hauptmann
- Escape from Sahara (1958)
- Pezzo, capopezzo e capitano (1958) — screenplay by Ennio De Concini, Duccio Tessari and W. Staudte
- The Muzzle (1958) — based on a novel by Heinrich Spoerl
- Roses for the Prosecutor (1959)
- The Fair (1960)
- The Last Witness (1960) — based on a book by Maximilian Vernberg
- The Happy Years of the Thorwalds (co-director: John Olden, 1962) — based on Time and the Conways by J. B. Priestley
- The Threepenny Opera (1963) — based on Brecht's Threepenny Opera
- Destination Death (1964)
- Das Lamm (1964) — based on a story by Willy Kramp
- Honour Among Thieves (1966) — based on a play by Charles Rudolph
- Heimlichkeiten (1968)
- Gentlemen in White Vests (1970)
- Jailbreak in Hamburg (1971)
- Yesterday's Tomorrow (1978)

Television

- Die Rebellion (1962, TV film) — based on the novel Rebellion by Joseph Roth
- Der Fall Kapitän Behrens – Fremdenlegionäre an Bord (1966, TV film)
- Die Klasse (1968, TV film) — based on a novel by Hermann Ungar
- Die Gartenlaube (1970, TV film) — based on a play by Hermann Ungar
- Der Kommissar: Messer im Rücken (1970, TV series episode)
- Der Kommissar: ...wie die Wölfe (1970, TV series episode)
- Die Kriminalnovelle (1970, TV series, 5 episodes)
- Die Person (1970, TV film) — based on a story by Manfred Bieler
- Der Kommissar: Besuch bei Alberti (1971, TV series episode)
- Der Kommissar: Ende eines Tanzvergnügens (1971, TV series episode)
- Der Kommissar: Die Anhalterin (1971, TV series episode)
- Der Kommissar: Lisa Bassenges Mörder (1971, TV series episode)
- Der Kommissar: Tod eines Ladenbesitzers (1971, TV series episode)
- Der Seewolf (1971, TV miniseries) — based on The Sea-Wolf by Jack London
- Der Kommissar: Ein rätselhafter Mord (1971, TV series episode)
- Der Kommissar: Die Tote im Park (1972, TV series episode)
- Verrat ist kein Gesellschaftsspiel (1972, TV film) — based on a novel by Raoul Anderland
- Marya Sklodowska-Curie (1972, TV film) — biographical film about Marie Curie
- Der Kommissar: Das Komplott (1973, TV series episode)
- Der Kommissar: Die Nacht, in der Basseck starb (1973, TV series episode)
- Der Kommissar: Ein Funken in der Kälte (1973, TV series episode)
- Nerze nachts am Straßenrand (1973, TV film) — based on a novel by Hansjörg Martin
- Tatort: Tote brauchen keine Wohnung (1973, TV series episode)
- Ein fröhliches Dasein (1974, TV film) — screenplay by Robert Wolfgang Schnell
- Lehmanns Erzählungen (1975, TV film) — based on a story by Siegfried Lenz
- Schließfach 763 (1975, TV film) — screenplay by Michael Mansfeld
- Kommissariat 9 (1975, TV series, 13 episodes)
- Burning Daylight (1975, TV miniseries) — based on Burning Daylight by Jack London
- Tatort: Zwei Leben (1976, TV series episode)
- Um zwei Erfahrungen reicher (1976, TV film) — screenplay by Robert Wolfgang Schnell
- Prozeß Medusa (1976, TV film) — based on a novel by Erwin K. Münz
- Tatort: Spätlese (1977, TV series episode)
- MS Franziska (1978, TV miniseries)
- Das verschollene Inka-Gold (1978, TV film) — based on a story by Jack London
- Feuerwasser (1978, TV film) — based on a play by Ulrich Becher
- Tatort: Die Kugel im Leib (1979, TV series episode)
- Iron Gustav (1979, TV miniseries) — based on the novel Iron Gustav by Hans Fallada
- Tatort: Schussfahrt (1980, TV series episode)
- Tatort: Schönes Wochenende (1980, TV series episode)
- Die Pawlaks (1982, TV miniseries)
- Nordlichter: Geschichten zwischen Watt und Weltstadt (1983, TV series, 4 episodes)
- Solo Run (1983, TV film) — based on a novel by Hans Herlin
- Tatort: Freiwild (1984, TV series episode)
- Der Snob (1984, TV film) — based on a play by Carl Sternheim
- So ein Theater (1984, TV film)
- Der eiserne Weg (1985, TV miniseries)

=== As screenwriter ===
- The Axe of Wandsbek (dir. Falk Harnack, 1951) — based on a novel by Arnold Zweig

=== As actor ===
- The Street Song (1931)
- Secret of the Blue Room (1932)
- Tannenberg (1932)
- Homecoming to Happiness (1933)
- Grand Duchess Alexandra (1933)
- The Hymn of Leuthen (1933)
- Stronger Than Regulations (1936)
- Susanne in the Bath (1936)
- Togger (1937)
- All Lies (1938)
- The Holm Murder Case (1938)
- By a Silken Thread (1938)
- D III 88 (1939)
- Shoulder Arms (1939)
- Legion Condor (1939)
- The Strange Woman (1939)
- Jud Süß (1940)
- Friedemann Bach (1941)
- Riding for Germany (1941)
- The Big Game (1942)
