= Kirmes =

Kirmes may refer to:

- Kirmes (also known as Kirchweih), festival dedicated to church's patron saint or the founding of local church in German-speaking countries
  - Kirmess or Kermesse, similar term in Dutch language
- The Fair (German: Kirmes), 1960 West German drama film
- Oskar Kirmes (born 1995), Finnish artistic gymnast
