= Gisela von Collande =

German actress (1915–1960)

- Born: Gisela Huberta Valentine Maria von Mitschke-Collande; 5 February 1915; Dresden, Saxony, German Empire
- Died: 22 October 1960 (aged 45); Pforzheim, Baden-Württemberg, West Germany
- Occupation: Actress
- Years active: 1936–1960 (film & TV)

Gisela von Collande (5 February 1915 – 22 October 1960) was a German film actress.

Gisela came from an acting family. She was the sister of the actor and director Volker von Collande. She married the actor Josef Dahmen, with whom she had a daughter Andrea Dahmen. The granddaughter Julia Dahmen also became an actress.

Collande played the role of Trude in the military spy film The Traitor which premiered on September 9, 1936 at the NSDAP Party Convention. She also played roles in Target in the Clouds (1939) and Pour le Mérite (1938), propaganda films for the Luftwaffe.

She was killed in 1960 during a traffic accident.

== Selected filmography ==
- Maria the Maid (1936)
- The Traitor (1936)
- The Broken Jug (1937)
- Pour le Mérite (1938)
- The False Step (1939)
- Target in the Clouds (1939)
- The Bath in the Barn (1943)
- The Sinful Border (1951)
- Roses Bloom on the Moorland (1952)
- Prosecutor Corda (1953)
- Alibi (1955)
- Stopover in Orly (1955)
- Heaven, Love and Twine (1960)
- Sacred Waters (1960)

== Bibliography ==
- Kreimeier, Klaus (1999). The Ufa Story: A History of Germany's Greatest Film Company, 1918–1945. Berkeley: University of California Press. ISBN 978-0-520-22069-0.
