= Josef Dahmen =

German actor (1903–1985)

- Born: 21 August 1903; Solingen, German Empire
- Died: 18 January 1985 (aged 81); Hamburg, West Germany
- Other name: Josef Jakob Dahmen
- Occupation: Actor
- Years active: 1931-1983 (film & TV)

Josef Dahmen (21 August 1903 – 18 January 1985) was a German stage, film and television actor.

Dahmen was married to the actress Gisela von Collande, with whom he had a daughter Andrea Dahmen. His granddaughter Julia Dahmen is also an actress. Dahmen had a vague resemblance to Hungarian actor Peter Lorre.

== Selected filmography ==
- Wibbel the Tailor (1931) - Sohn des Wirts
- M (1931) - (uncredited)
- A Tremendously Rich Man (1932)
- The Hymn of Leuthen (1933) - Georg - Soldier
- The Lake Calls (1933) - Besatzung der 'Carola'
- Typhoon (1933) - Werkdetektiv
- The Testament of Dr. Mabuse (1933)
- Refugees (1933) - Man with red hair
- Zwischen zwei Herzen (1934) - Müller, Chauffeur bei Sonnekamp
- Pappi (1934) - Fred
- Heinz in the Moon (1934)
- Between Two Hearts (1934)
- Decoy (1934) - Bandit
- La Paloma. Ein Lied der Kameradschaft (1934)
- Love, Death and the Devil (1934) - Macco
- Don't Lose Heart, Suzanne! (1935) - Kurvenkarl
- Carmen Loura (1935)
- Pygmalion (1935)
- Anschlag auf Schweda (1935) - Ein Bühnenarbeiter
- The Last Four on Santa Cruz (1936) - Cocteau
- Der müde Theodor (1936) - Felix Rieger
- The Traitor (1936) - Ein Helfer
- City of Anatol (1936) - Arbeiter bei Gregor
- Under Blazing Heavens (1936) - Polizeiarzt
- My Son the Minister (1937) - Ein revolutionärer Zwischenrufer
- Unternehmen Michael (1937) - Ein Defätist
- Manege (1937)
- Mother Song (1937) - Inspizient
- Urlaub auf Ehrenwort (1938) - Zweiter Gauner
- Grossalarm (1938)
- Capriccio (1938) - Brautwerber und Zechkumpane Barberousses
- Pour le Mérite (1938) - Zuschlag
- The Immortal Heart (1939) - Matrose
- New Year's Eve on Alexanderplatz (1939) - Anton Lingenfelder
- Salonwagen E 417 (1939) - Zimmerkellner im 'Deutschen Kaiser'
- Renate in the Quartet (1939) - Musiker am Konservatorium
- The Sensational Casilla Trial (1939) - Vergifteter Co-Pilot
- Legion Condor (1939) - Unteroffizier
- Above All Else in the World (1941) - Uffz. Weber
- Ohm Krüger (1941) - Englischer Soldat im Frauenkonzentrationslager
- Stukas (1941) - Feldwebel Traugott
- Sechs Tage Heimaturlaub (1941) - Chauffeur
- People in the Storm (1941) - Serbischer Soldat
- Two in a Big City (1942) - Gesang (uncredited)
- Schicksal (1942) - Diener
- A Gust of Wind (1942) - Herr Galassi
- Die goldene Stadt (1942) - Ein Bauer
- Diesel (1942) - Maschinist bei Buz
- Ein glücklicher Mensch (1943)
- The Crew of the Dora (1943) - Feldwebel Otto Roggenkamp
- Gefährlicher Frühling (1943) - Dr. Oskar Neugefeldt
- Eine kleine Sommermelodie (1944) - Feldwebel
- Kolberg (1945) - Franz
- Der Erbförster (1945)
- The Last Night (1949) - Rostard, Kellner
- Thirteen Under One Hat (1950) - Herr Fleischer
- Blondes for Export (1950) - Armand
- Harbour Melody (1950) - Barmixer
- The Shadow of Herr Monitor (1950) - Hafenarbeiter
- The Rabanser Case (1950) - Herr Imhoff
- Third from the Right (1950) - Diener Josef
- The Lost One (1951) - Lieske, canteen bartender (uncredited)
- Kommen Sie am Ersten (1951) - Gregory
- Roses Bloom on the Moorland (1952) - Der schwedische Leutnant
- Shooting Stars (1952) - Eisenbahner
- Don't Forget Love (1953)
- Das singende Hotel (1953)
- Not Afraid of Big Animals (1953) - Schwerer Junge
- Eine Liebesgeschichte (1954)
- The Man of My Life (1954)
- Columbus Discovers Kraehwinkel (1954)
- They Were So Young (1954) - Dr. Perez
- Operation Sleeping Bag (1955) - Major Fercher
- Zwei blaue Augen (1955) - Professor Wittmann
- Die Ehe des Dr. med. Danwitz (1956) - Regierungsrat
- Skandal um Dr. Vlimmen (1956) - Schlachtermeister Van Heusden
- A Heart Returns Home (1956) - Dr. Brandel
- Für zwei Groschen Zärtlichkeit (1957) - Paul Müller
- The Heart of St. Pauli (1957) - Polizeibeamter
- Heart Without Mercy (1958)
- Man in the River (1958) - Bergungsinspektor Garms
- The Girl from the Marsh Croft (1958) - Vater Nilsson
- The Muzzle (1958) - Bankier (uncredited)
- Thirteen Old Donkeys (1958) - Dr. Köster
- The Magliari (1959) - Herr Mayer
- The Buddenbrooks (1959) - Rektor Wulicke
- The Terrible People (1960) - Henker (uncredited)
- Pichler's Books Are Not in Order (1961) - Manager
- Treasure of Silver Lake (1962) - Hartley (voice, uncredited)
- Tim Frazer (1963, TV miniseries) - Edgar Tupper

== Bibliography ==
- Youngkin, Stephen. The Lost One: A Life of Peter Lorre. University Press of Kentucky, 2005.
