= You and I (1938 film) =

1938 film

- Directed by: Wolfgang Liebeneiner
- Written by: Eberhard Frowein (novel); Curt J. Braun
- Produced by: Curt Prickler; Walter Tost
- Starring: Brigitte Horney; Joachim Gottschalk; Paul Bildt; Heinz Welzel
- Cinematography: Bruno Mondi
- Edited by: Walter von Bonhorst
- Music by: Wolfgang Zeller
- Production company: Minerva Tonfilm
- Distributed by: Terra Film
- Release date: 14 September 1938
- Running time: 106 minutes
- Country: Germany
- Language: German

You and I (German: Du und ich) is a 1938 German romance film directed by Wolfgang Liebeneiner and starring Brigitte Horney, Joachim Gottschalk and Paul Bildt. It was shot at the Babelsberg Studios in Potsdam and on location around Hohenstein-Ernstthal and Oberlungwitz in Saxony. The film's sets were designed by the art directors Kurt Herlth, Robert Herlth and Werner Schlichting.

== Cast ==
- Brigitte Horney as Anna Uhlig
- Joachim Gottschalk as Johann Uhlig
- Paul Bildt as Balke
- Heinz Welzel as Otz Uhlig
- Werner Schott as Schütz
- Elsa Wagner as Direktrice bei Schütz
- Karl Hannemann as Merkner
- André Saint-Germain as Forescu
- Just Scheu as Pulvermacher
- Eduard Wenck as Zirbel
- Arthur Fritz Eugens as Otz Uhlig als Kind
- Yvonne Klußmann as Friedel Schütz als Kind
- Cordula Grun as Friedel Schütz
- Falk May as Kurt Schütz als Kind
- Fritz Kösling as Kurt Schütz
- Elisabeth Eygk as Frau Pulvermacher
- Borwin Walth as Selbter
- Richard Weimer as Tschirwitz
- Otto Below as Unger
- Marga Eckardt as Hulda
- Else Ehser as Nettie
- Katja Bennefeld as Kundin bei Schütz
- Annemarie Korff as Dame bei Ball
- Ruth Claus as Verkäuferin bei Schütz
- Ellen Plessow
- Wera Schultz
- Charlotte Witthauer as Minna
- Gerhard Dammann as Gerichtsvollzieher
- Rudolf Essek
- Karl Fochler as Strumpfwirker
- Kurt Felden
- Günther Hadank as Pfarrer
- Jochen Kuhlmey as Gast beim Postwirt
- Wilhelm P. Krüger as Schrankenwärter
- Leopold von Ledebur as Oberregierungsrat
- Paul Luka as Strumpfwirker
- Karl Morvilius as Sekretär bei Merkner
- Paul May
- Hans Meyer-Hanno as Hauswirt Schröder
- Karl Platen
- Albert Venohr as Postwirt
- Herbert Weissbach as Mann, der die Kriegsgefahr verkündet
- Walter Werner as Helling

== Bibliography ==
- Hake, Sabine. Popular Cinema of the Third Reich. University of Texas Press, 2001.
