= Hainewalde =

- Municipality
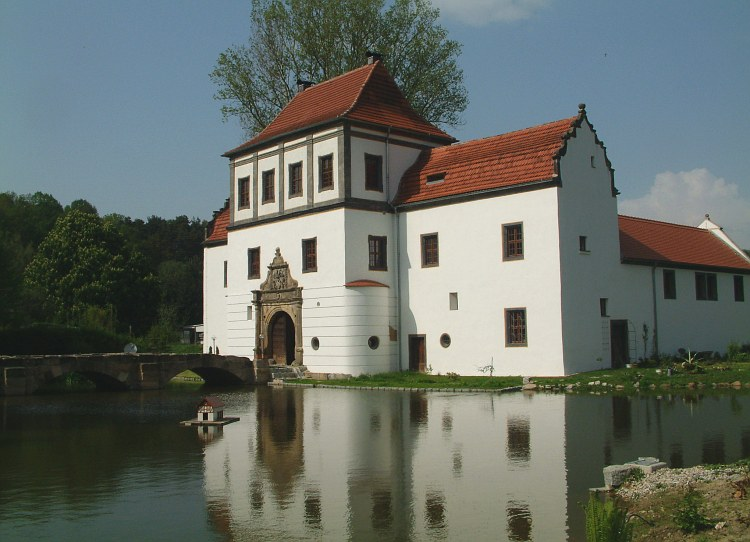
- The old castle gate lodge

- Coat of arms

- Location of Hainewalde within Görlitz district
- Interactive map of Hainewalde
- Location within Germany Location within Saxony
- Coordinates: 50°54′20″N 14°42′00″E
- Country: Germany
- State: Saxony
- District: Görlitz

Government
  - Mayor (2022–29): Andreas Mory

Area
  - Total: 12.96 km^{2} (5.00 sq mi)
- Elevation: 322 m (1,056 ft)

Population (2025-12-31)
  - Total: 1,501
  - Density: 115.8/km^{2} (300.0/sq mi)
- Time zone: UTC+01:00 (CET)
  - Summer (DST): UTC+02:00 (CEST)
- Postal codes: 02779
- Dialling codes: 035841
- Vehicle registration: GR
- Website: www.hainewalde.de

Hainewalde (Upper Sorbian: Hajnowo) is a village in Germany on the river Mandau, in the Bundesland (federal state) of Saxony and the district Görlitz, historically belonging to Upper Lusatia. The village is part of the administrative partnership Großschönau-Waltersdorf.

== Geography and transportation ==
The community Hainewalde is approximatively 10 km apart from Zittau in the foreland of the Lusatian Mountains. The federal highway 96 passes Hainewalde in the north, the Czech border is approximatively 15 km west of it. The railroad Zittau-Varnsdorf has a station in Hainewalde.

== History ==
Hainewalde was first documented in 1272. It is believed that the name is derived from the founder, a man named "Hener", "Heno", "Hening" or "Heinrich". Settlers of the German feudal eastward-expansion established Hainewalde as a so-called "Waldhufendorf" by stubbing the forest along the river Mandau.

In 1392 the Old Castle, formerly the gate lodge, was built as a manor.

Saxony took control of Upper Lusatia, and therefore Hainewalde, after the treaty of Prague (1636) which resulted in the restriction of the personal and religious freedoms of the residents. Around 1650, the local population saw a noticeable increase from Bohemian exiles and refugees.

From 1749 to 1753, a new castle was built by the Prussian chamberlain von Canitz.

Hainewalde was the residence of the old Saxon noble family Kanitz-Kyaw until 1927 when the castle, its ground, and forest were sold on 12 March 1927 due to excessive debts of the family.

Since 1928, the castle was under the authority of the neighbouring community of Großschönau. On 26 March 1933, it was occupied by the Nazi-German stormtroopers from Dresden, which set up a provisional concentration camp for political prisoners. The first prisoners arrived on 28 March 1933. On 10 August 1933, the KZ Hainewalde was closed and served as "Wehrertüchtigungslager" until the end of World War II. Until 1972, it was primarily used as residential house and remained empty since that. A private association founded in 2000 is now working on its preservation.

== Main sights ==
- Umgebindehaeuser (typical Lusatian half-timbered houses)
- Church, built in 1705-1711
- The Wasserschloss, built under rule of the family von Nositz, was located north of the terraces of the new castle. The only remain of the old water castle, which was demolished in 1780, is the gate lodge with his west-side Renaissance-portal.
- Schloss (New Castle), constructed in 1750–1753, along with its Baroque gardens, under the rule of the Kanitz-Kyaw family. It was renovated in 1883, the Baroque elements on the outside façade removed and replaced by "Italian"-style sgraffito.
- The Baroque crypt of the family Kanitz-Kyaw, in the cemetery (1715).
- Mountain Breiteberg with look-out, restaurant and "Querxhöhle"

== People ==
- Gottlob Friedrich Seligmann, Lutheran theologian
- Karl August Wünsche, German Christian Hebraist, born 1839
