= Juliette Mayniel =

French actress (1936–2023)

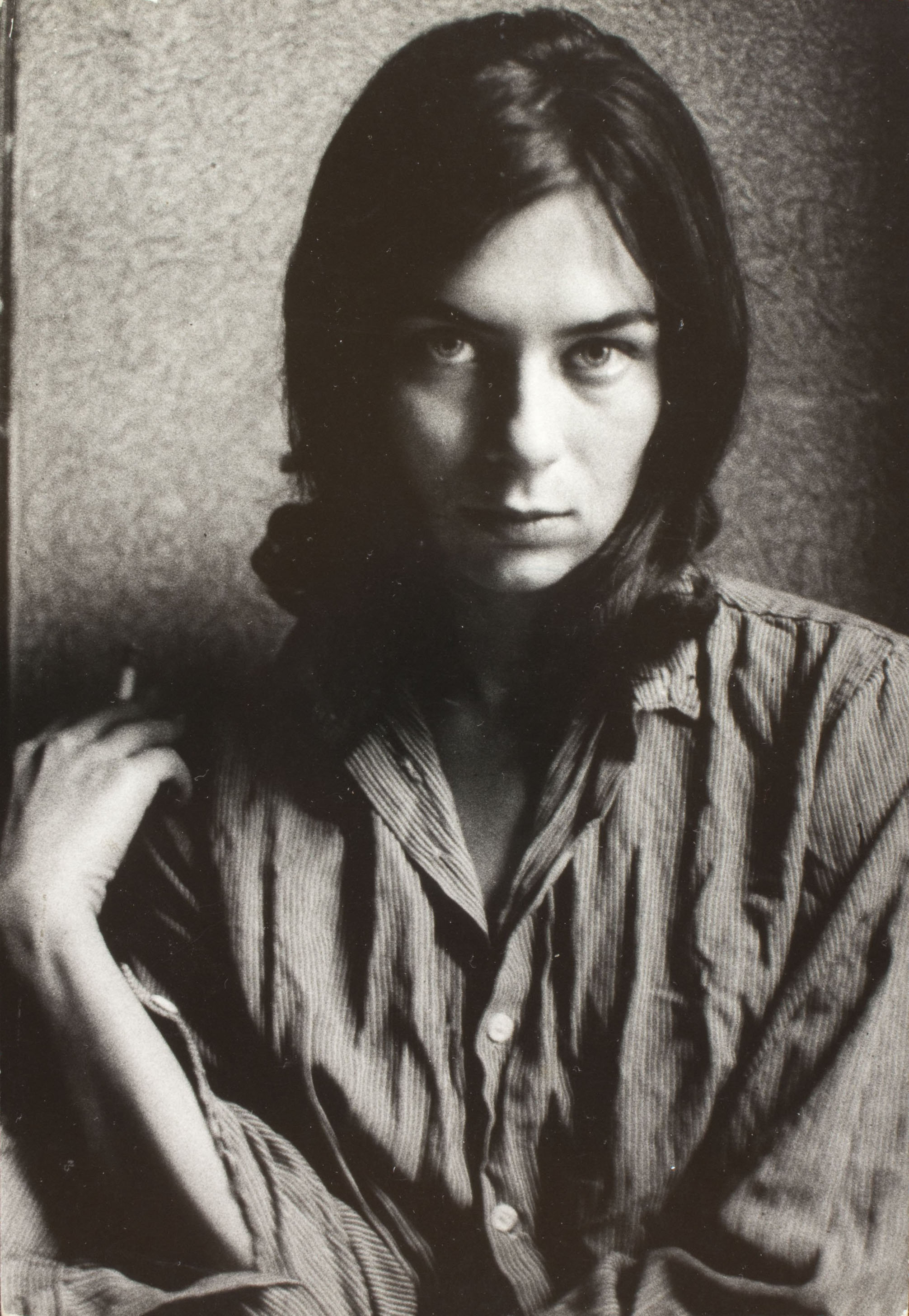
- Mayniel in 1960
- Born: 22 January 1936; Saint-Hippolyte, Aveyron, France
- Died: 21 July 2023 (aged 87); San Miguel de Allende, Guanajuato, Mexico
- Occupation: Actress
- Years active: 1958–1978
- Partner(s): Vittorio Gassman (1964–1968)
- Children: Alessandro Gassmann
- Relatives: Leo Gassmann (grandson)

Juliette Mayniel (22 January 1936 – 21 July 2023) was a French actress. She appeared in more than 30 films and television shows between 1958 and 1978. At the 10th Berlin International Film Festival, she won the Silver Bear for Best Actress for her role in the film The Fair.

== Life and career ==
The daughter of French peasants, Mayniel grew up in an isolated village. Her parents' country house became the Allied headquarters during World War II.

Her feature film debut was Les Cousins. The film's director and producer, Claude Chabrol, writes in his autobiography that he discovered her in an advertisement film for soap.

From 1964 to 1968, she was married to Italian actor Vittorio Gassman with whom she had a son, Alessandro, who is an actor too. She lived in Mexico. Mayniel died on 21 July 2023, at the age of 87.

== Selected filmography ==
- Les Cousins (1959)
- Island Fishermen (1959)
- The Fair (1960)
- Eyes Without a Face (1960)
- The Trojan Horse (1961)
- Landru (1963)
- Ophelia (1963)
- Because, Because of a Woman (1963)
- Amori pericolosi (1964)
- Assassination in Rome (1965)
- L'Odissea (1968)
- Listen, Let's Make Love (1969)
- Flatfoot (1973)
- The Family Vice (1975)
- The Bloodstained Shadow (1978)
