= Hainewalde concentration camp =

Nazi concentration camp in Germany

Coordinates: 50°54′54″N 14°42′29″E

On March 27, 1933, the Sturmabteilung established a protective custody camp at Hainewalde Castle in Hainewalde, Saxony, Germany. Initially SA-Sturm III (Dresden) under SA-Sturmführer Ernst Jirka guarded the camp, but in May this responsibility fell to SA-Standarte 102 (Zittau) under SA-Standartenführer Paul Unterstab. Altogether there were about 150 guards. The camp's commandant was SA-Sturmbannführer Müller and the adjutant was SA- Sturmbannführer Mittag. On April 12, 1933, the camp held 259 prisoners, but that number subsequently increased to almost four hundred. In total, approximately one thousand prisoners passed through the camp.

== Overview ==
An itemization for Hainewalde revealed that protective custody cost the Saxon government over 130,000 Marks. When the camp was dissolved on August 10, 1933, the remaining prisoners were transferred to larger early concentration camps at Hohnstein Castle and Sachsenburg.

Hainewalde's prisoners consisted mainly of leftists and Jews. About 150 were crammed into one barrack, where the prisoners slept on multi-tiered bunks with straw mattresses. The prisoners were required to attend Protestant religious services, as well as nightly Nazi indoctrination. For the latter purpose, younger and older prisoners were housed separately, on the theory that the young prisoners would be more susceptible to Nazification if isolated from their elders.

The SA forced the prisoners to perform penal exercises, conducted torture under the pretext of interrogation, and directed all but the most serious cases of injury or illness to a cellar for warehousing without medical treatment. The SA used an administrative office and a special bunker for interrogations. Prisoners were also compelled to work in woodcutting and latrine details. Jews and intellectuals were singled out for humiliation and brutal treatment.

The outlawed German Social Democratic Party continued to assist Hainewalde's prisoners. For example, the Prague-based, socialist newspaper Arbeiter-Illustrierte-Zeitung reproduced the photograph of a Hainewalde detainee. A sympathetic SA guard had smuggled the image out of camp, which revealed a prisoner in terrible condition. Zittau's underground Communist organization also smuggled propaganda into the camp that let the prisoners know their suffering had not been forgotten: "We know that you have remained loyal to the cause of the working classes with unfaltering courage, in spite of all the terror and despite the harassment to which you have been exposed. ... We know very well-and also the working classes know-what you have suffered. If we send you this greeting despite all difficulties of illegality inside the concentration camp, take it as an avowal of our undivided solidarity with you."

The camp administration imposed strict conditions for release from custody. On pain of arrest, released prisoners signed a declaration swearing not to discuss conditions in Hainewalde. According to another declaration, dated August 5, 1933, the released detainee promised not to associate again with "Marxist parties".

In 1948, the Bautzen state court sentenced 39 guards to penitentiary terms for their role in the maltreatment of Hainewalde prisoners. The trial was conducted under the auspices of the Soviet occupation, but further details are not known. No additional information has emerged so far about Hainewalde, for which further research is needed.

== Specific prisoners ==
=== Axel Eggebrecht ===
Axel Eggebrecht was held at Hainewalde from April to May 1933. A resident of Berlin, he was visiting his father in Leipzig at the time of his arrest, March 5, 1933, which coincided with Germany's election day. After a month in jail, he was delivered to Hainewalde. As the prisoners entered the gate, a teacher among them joked that the castle once held the "favorites" of the Saxon king, August the Strong. A guard then put them through a mindless initiation rite. With the command, "Right leg, high!" Eggebrecht raised his leg like a "stork". When the SA next issued the impossible order to raise the left leg as well, he refused to do so, in the gruff language of the barracks. In the exchange that followed, the guard ascertained that Eggebrecht was a World War veteran. Eggebrecht soon realized, however, that his military service meant little to the guards. Stereotyped as an intellectual, he was ordered to work in a humiliating labor command. "Aha-the scriptwriter from Berlin!" Sturmführer Jirka exclaimed, "I have something extra fine for you-the shit detail!"

Eggebrecht recalled a rumor that the prisoners would be released on May Day, but it turned out not to have any foundation.

Eggebrecht was interrogated, but not tortured. In this regard his experience contrasted with other Hainewalde prisoners. Eggebrecht recalled the interrogator's interest in how he had gotten mixed up with the Communists, after growing up in a "good home". His release came through his father's intercession with an influential Saxon official, Professor Apel. Eggebrecht's father wrote him about Apel's interest in his case. Sometime later, his father visited him at the camp. Exclaiming that the conditions were "unworthy" of his son, the father added that he should be patient, because "it won't last much longer!" Several days later, Eggebrecht was released after signing a promise not to circulate "atrocity stories".

=== Benno Berg ===
Eggebrecht's bunkmate, a Jewish prisoner named Benno Berg, experienced a rare moment of humor after a reeducation session. A Nazi Kreisleiter lectured the detainees on the Jewish threat, quoting the stock phrase, "the Jews are our misfortune." After the speech, he inspected the prisoners and stopped in front of Berg. In response to the Kreisleiter's questions, Berg gave his name and birthplace: "Berg, from Reichenberg, Bohemia." Not realizing that the prisoner was Jewish, the Nazi announced: "A Sudeten national comrade! Bravo! All of you will come to us again!" Eggebrecht added: "The big shot's fat hand struck the 'non-Aryan' appreciatively on the shoulder. 'For myself, you are the model of the true SA man! Heil Hitler!' Hand raised, he strutted away."

== Notes ==
This article incorporates text from the United States Holocaust Memorial Museum, and has been released under the GFDL.
