= Lessons in Love (1935 film) =

1935 film directed by Carl Hoffmann

- Directed by: Carl Hoffmann
- Written by: Bobby E. Lüthge; Aldo von Pinelli
- Based on: Einen Jux will er sich machen by Johann Nestroy
- Produced by: Curt Prickler
- Starring: Luise Ullrich; Paul Hörbiger; Lee Parry; Theo Lingen
- Cinematography: Günther Anders
- Edited by: Erich Palme
- Music by: Theo Mackeben
- Production company: Minerva Tonfilm
- Distributed by: Europa Film
- Release date: 20 September 1935
- Running time: 96 minutes
- Country: Germany
- Language: German

Lessons in Love (German: Das Einmaleins der Liebe) is a 1935 German historical comedy film directed by Carl Hoffmann and starring Luise Ullrich, Paul Hörbiger, Lee Parry and Theo Lingen. The film is an adaptation of the 1842 play Einen Jux will er sich machen by Austrian writer Johann Nestroy. It was shot at the Babelsberg Studios in Potsdam. The film's sets were designed by the art directors Otto Erdmann and Hans Sohnle.

== Cast ==
- Luise Ullrich as Sophie Bruninger
- Paul Hörbiger as Alois Weinberl
- Lee Parry as Madame Knorr
- Theo Lingen as Melchior Feuerfuchs
- Genia Nikolaieva as Carlotta de Melac
- Paul Henckels as Zangler
- Gustav Waldau as Modlinger
- Gertrud Wolle
- Vera Schulz
- Gerdi Gerdt
- Paul Heidemann
- Hans Hermann Schaufuß
- Rudolf Klein-Rogge
- Oskar Sima
- Eugen Rex
- Klaus Pohl
- Hadrian Maria Netto
- Rudolf Essek
- Arthur Reppert
- Josef Reithofer
- Ernst Behmer
- Wilhelm Bendow
- Inge Landgut
- Viktor Staal

== Bibliography ==
- Klaus, Ulrich J. Deutsche Tonfilme: Jahrgang 1935. Klaus-Archiv, 1988.
- Thomas, Douglas B. The Early History of German Motion Pictures, 1895–1935. Thomas International, 1999.
- Waldman, Harry. Nazi Films In America, 1933–1942. McFarland & Co, 2008.
