= The Lake Calls =

1933 film

- Directed by: Hans Hinrich
- Written by: Helmut Brandis; Henrik Ibsen (poem); Hans Klaehr; Josef Pelz von Felinau
- Produced by: Wilhelm Hübner
- Starring: Heinrich George; Erika Helmke; Hans Mierendorff
- Cinematography: Kurt Neubert; Willy Winterstein
- Edited by: Roelofsz
- Music by: Karl Knauer; Werner Schmidt-Boelcke
- Production company: Deutsche Eidophon-Film
- Distributed by: Deutsche Eidophon-Film
- Release date: 23 February 1933
- Running time: 98 minutes
- Country: Germany
- Language: German

The Lake Calls (German: Das Meer ruft) is a 1933 German drama film directed by Hans Hinrich and starring Heinrich George, Erika Helmke and Hans Mierendorff. It is based on the poem "Terje Vigen" by Henrik Ibsen. It was shot at the Terra Studios in Berlin and on location on the Danish island of Bornholm in the Baltic Sea. The film's sets were designed by the art directors Ernö Metzner and Erich Zander. The film shifted the setting from Ibsen's original work which took place in the Napoleonic Wars to the Baltic during the First World War.

== Cast ==
- Heinrich George as Terje Wiggen
- Erika Helmke as Antje, seine Frau
- Hans Mierendorff as Peters, Kapitän der 'Carola'
- Franz Stein as Der alte Jansen
- Herta Scheel as Frau Larsen
- Ludwig Andersen as Kommandant des Torpedobootes
- Ernst Busch as Besatzung der 'Carola'
- Josef Dahmen as Besatzung der 'Carola'
- Herbert Gernot as Besatzung der 'Carola'
- Otto Griese as Besatzung der 'Carola'
- Hans Kettler as Besatzung der 'Carola'
- Albert Florath
- Kurt Getke
- Charlie Kracker
- Otto Krone-Matzenauer
- Josef Peterhans
- Gustav Püttjer
- Arthur Reinhardt
- Herbert Schmidt
- Franz Sutton
- Ferdinand von Alten
- Roland von Rossi
- Franz Weber
- Walter Werner

== Bibliography ==
- Biltereyst, Daniel; Gennari, Daniela Treveri, eds. (2014). Moralizing Cinema: Film, Catholicism, and Power. Routledge. ISBN 978-1-134-66831-1.
