= Arthur Fritz Eugens =

German actor

- Born: 31 October 1930; Germany
- Died: 18 January 1944 (aged 13); Müncheberg, Nazi Germany
- Occupation: Actor
- Years active: 1936–1942 (film)

Arthur Fritz Eugens (1930–1944) was a German film actor. As a child actor he appeared in a number of German films during the Nazi era. He was killed during the Second World War during an air raid.

== Selected filmography ==
- Maria the Maid (1936)
- A Doctor of Conviction (1936)
- Kater Lampe (1936)
- Doctor Engel (1936)
- Vor Liebe wird gewarnt (1937)
- Patriots (1937)
- You and I (1938)
- Skandal um den Hahn (1938)
- Men Are That Way (1939)
- Mistake of the Heart (1939)
- Roman eines Arztes (1939)
- Bismarck (1940)
- Enemies (1940)
- Ein Zug fährt ab (1942)

== Bibliography ==
- Holmstrom, John. The Moving Picture Boy: An International Encyclopaedia from 1895 to 1995, Michael Russell, 1996.
- Noack, Frank. Veit Harlan: The Life and Work of a Nazi Filmmaker. University Press of Kentucky, 2016.
