= Gaston Briese =

German actor (1898–1953)

- Born: 19 August 1898; Berlin, German Empire
- Died: 22 March 1953 (aged 54); West Berlin, West Germany
- Occupation: Actor
- Years active: 1926–46 (film)

Gaston Briese (19 August 1898 – 22 March 1953) was a German stage and film actor. He appeared in more than forty films during his career, which spanned from the late silent era to the mid-1940s. His final appearance was in the 1946 rubble film Somewhere in Berlin.

== Selected filmography ==
- The Pink Slippers (1927)
- The Standard-Bearer of Sedan (1927)
- Always Be True and Faithful (1927)
- Gentlemen Among Themselves (1929)
- Distinguishing Features (1929)
- The Love Market (1930)
- Wibbel the Tailor (1931)
- Without Meyer, No Celebration is Complete (1931)
- Terror of the Garrison (1931)
- When the Village Music Plays on Sunday Nights (1933)
- Bashful Felix (1934)
- The Bird Seller (1935)
- Trouble Backstairs (1935)
- The Dreamer (1936)
- Paul and Pauline (1936)
- Orders Are Orders (1936)
- Hilde and the Volkswagen (1936)
- Red Orchids (1938)
- Falstaff in Vienna (1940)
- Her Private Secretary (1940)
- Somewhere in Berlin (1946)

== Bibliography ==
- Shandley, Robert. Rubble Films: German Cinema in the Shadow of the Third Reich. Temple University Press, 2010.
