= Oh! This Bavaria! =

1960 film

- DVD cover
- Directed by: Arnulf Schröder
- Written by: Ludwig Thoma (play Die Medaille); Hannes Peter
- Starring: Rudolf Vogel; Liesl Karlstadt; Jürgen von Alten
- Cinematography: Paul Grupp
- Edited by: Horst Rossberger
- Music by: Raimund Rosenberger
- Production company: Hubert Schonger Produktion
- Distributed by: Adria Filmverleih
- Release date: 11 August 1960
- Running time: 87 minutes
- Country: West Germany
- Language: German

Oh! This Bavaria! (German: O, diese Bayern!) is a 1960 West German comedy film directed by Arnulf Schröder and starring Rudolf Vogel, Liesl Karlstadt and Jürgen von Alten.

== Cast ==
- Rudolf Vogel as Steinbeißl, the Government Director
- Liesl Karlstadt as Wally Neusigl
- Jürgen von Alten as Johann Peter Neusigl
- Brigitte Rau as Housemaid Anna
- Ulrich Beiger as Assessor
- Heini Göbel as Heberlein, the Teacher
- Paula Braend as Amalie Kranzeder
- Veronika Fitz as Babette, the Housemaid
- Ernst Barthels as Johann Peter Neusigl, the Clerk
- Franz Fröhlich as Herr Guthofer
- Ludwig Schmid-Wildy as Harnrieder, the Municipal Councilor
- Alfred Pongratz as Herr Sedlmayr
- Helmut Fischer as Merkl, the Municipal Councilor

== Bibliography ==
- Höfig, Willi (1973). Der deutsche Heimatfilm 1947–1960. Stuttgart: F. Enke. ISBN 9783432018058.
