= Hans Sternberg =

German actor (1878–1948)

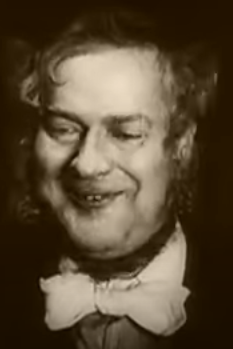
- Sternberg playing the Mayor in the 1921 movie "Destiny"
- Born: 3 July 1878; Lübeck, German Empire
- Died: 13 May 1948 (aged 69); Berlin, Allied-occupied Germany
- Years active: 1919-1946
- Known for: German Actor

Hans Sternberg (3 July 1878 – 13 May 1948) was a German-Jewish stage and film actor.

== Selected filmography ==
- Peer Gynt (1919)
- Destiny (1921)
- The Fateful Day (1921)
- Tiefland (1923)
- The Stone Rider (1923)
- The Third Watch (1924)
- Athletes (1925)
- War in Peace (1925)
- The Humble Man and the Chanteuse (1925)
- A Murderous Girl (1927)
- The False Prince (1927)
- Black Forest Girl (1929)
- It's You I Have Loved (1929)
- Yes, Yes, Women Are My Weakness (1929)
- The Smuggler's Bride of Mallorca (1929)
- Marriage in Name Only (1930)
- Flachsmann the Educator (1930)
- The Fate of Renate Langen (1931)
- The Five Accursed Gentlemen (1932)
- The Black Forest Girl (1933)
- Young Dessau's Great Love (1933)
- Pappi (1934)
- Playing with Fire (1934)
- The Schimeck Family (1935)
- Paul and Pauline (1936)
- The Mystery of Betty Bonn (1938)
- The Golden City (1942)
- Clothes Make the Man (1940)
- Free Land (1946)
