= The Mistress of Solderhof =

1955 film

- Directed by: Jürgen von Alten
- Written by: Franz Grohmann; Jürgen von Alten
- Starring: Ilse Werner; Viktor Staal; Harald Maresch
- Cinematography: Ernst W. Kalinke
- Edited by: Walter Fredersdorf
- Music by: Bert Rudolf
- Production company: Alba Film
- Distributed by: Adler-Film Anna-Althoff
- Release date: 30 December 1955
- Running time: 95 minutes
- Country: West Germany
- Language: German

The Mistress of Solderhof (German: Die Herrin vom Sölderhof) is a 1955 West German drama film directed by Jürgen von Alten and starring Ilse Werner, Viktor Staal, and Harald Maresch.

It was shot at the Bavaria Studios in Munich and on location in Baden-Baden, Bad Aibling and around the lake at Chiemsee. The film's sets were designed by the art director Willy Schatz.

== Cast ==
- Ilse Werner as Christa von Soldern
- Viktor Staal as Dr. Stefan Heim
- Harald Maresch as Franz Trautwein, Geschäftsmann
- Bum Krüger as Julius Brecht, genannt "Jule"
- Annie Rosar as Margarete Heim, Stefans Mutter
- Albert Florath as Fritz Heim, Stefans Vater
- Ida Wüst as Baronin von Soldern, Christas Tante
- Wastl Witt as Jakob Menke, ein alter Gärtner
- Hans Leibelt as Professor Hilgen
- Angèle Durand as Rita, Amanti, Barsängerin
- Christoph Schneider as Peter, Sohn von Christa und Stefan
- Ado Riegler as Karl Schwenninger, Landrat
- Karl-Heinz Peters as Hotelportier
- Margrit Ensinger
- Hans Erich Pfleger
- Ingrid van Bergen
- Herta Worell as Eva Mainzer

== Bibliography ==
- Bock, Hans-Michael; Bergfelder, Tim, eds. (2009). The Concise Cinegraph: Encyclopaedia of German Cinema. New York: Berghahn Books. ISBN 978-1-57181-655-9.
