= Oskar Jerschke =

German playwright and collaborator of Arno Holz

Oskar Jerschke (July 17, 1861 – August 3, 1928) was a German playwright and collaborator of Arno Holz.

Jerschke was born in Lähn, the son of a military engineer and raised in the rectory of his Uncle until his father settled in Strasbourg. He studied law in Strasbourg and Berlin, settling in Strasbourg as an attorney.

After the First World War, when Alsace and Strasbourg came under French control, he was expelled to Berlin. There he published the tragicomedy Traumulus (The Dreamer) with his childhood friend Arno Holz in 1905. The work was a great success and a film version was made in 1936, directed by Carl Froelich and starring Emil Jannings.

Jerschke died in Berlin, aged 67.

== Selected works ==
- Deutsche Weisen (1884) with Arno Holz
- Traumulus (1905) with Arno Holz
- Gaudeamus! A festival play for the 350th jubilee of the University of Jena (1908), with Arno Holz
- Die Perle der Antillen, Comedy (1909) with Arno Holz
- Büxl, Comedy (1911) with Arno Holz
- Mein deutsches Vaterland (1916)
