= Curt Prickler =

German film producer

- Born: Artur Edgar Kurt Prickler; 26 February 1885; Tilsit, East Prussia, German Empire
- Died: 6 October 1952 (aged 67); Wolfratshausen, Bavaria, West Germany
- Occupation: Producer
- Years active: 1913–1949 (film)

Curt Prickler (1885–1952) was a German film producer. He entered the German film industry with PAGU before serving in the First World War. He gradually worked his way up through the film industry working for figures such as Joe May and Karl Grune. He was one of the instrumental figures in establishing Minerva Tonfilm in 1934. In addition he worked as a production manager on a number of films. After the Second World War he was involved with the production of the Rubble film Love '47.

== Selected filmography ==
- Katharina Knie (1929)
- Charley's Aunt (1934)
- Lessons in Love (1935)
- Stronger Than Regulations (1936)
- Susanne in the Bath (1936)
- Togger (1937)
- The Girl with a Good Reputation (1938)
- You and I (1938)
- Liberated Hands (1939)
- The Girl from Barnhelm (1940)
- Comrades (1941)
- The Girl from Fano (1941)
- Beloved World (1942)
- Love '47 (1947)

== Bibliography ==
- Giesen, Rolf. Nazi Propaganda Films: A History and Filmography. McFarland & Company, 2003.
- Meier, Gustav. Filmstadt Göttingen: Bilder für eine neue Welt? : zur Geschichte der Göttinger Spielfilmproduktion 1945 bis 1961. Reichold, 1996.
