= Maria Krahn =

German actress

- Born: 1896
- Died: 1977 (aged 80–81)
- Occupation: Actress

Maria Krahn (1896–1977) was a German actress.

== Selected filmography ==
- Wibbel the Tailor (1931)
- Pappi (1934)
- A Woman With Power of Attorney (1934)
- Hermine and the Seven Upright Men (1935)
- The Private Life of Louis XIV (1935)
- Pillars of Society (1935)
- The Valiant Navigator (1935)
- Don't Lose Heart, Suzanne! (1935)
- Susanne in the Bath (1936)
- The Merry Wives (1936)
- Family Parade (1936)
- Augustus the Strong (1936)
- Stronger Than Regulations (1936)
- Another World (1937)
- Togger (1937)
- The Irresistible Man (1937)
- Woman's Love—Woman's Suffering (1937)
- Freight from Baltimore (1938)
- The Holm Murder Case (1938)
- Between the Parents (1938)
- The Muzzle (1938)
- Napoleon Is to Blame for Everything (1938)
- What Now, Sibylle? (1938)
- Congo Express (1939)
- We Danced Around the World (1939)
- Wibbel the Tailor (1939)
- Mein Leben für Irland (1941)
- Illusion (1941)
- Much Ado About Nixi (1942)
- Der große König (1942)
- Gesprengte Gitter (1950)
- Two Times Lotte (1950)
- The Imaginary Invalid (1952)
- Elephant Fury (1953)
- Secretly Still and Quiet (1953)
- The Angel with the Flaming Sword (1954)
- Love's Carnival (1955)
- Roses in Autumn (1955)
