= The Schimeck Family (1935 film) =

1935 German film by E.W. Emo

- Directed by: E.W. Emo
- Written by: Reinhold Meißner; Max Wallner
- Based on: The Schimek Family by Gustaf Kadelburg
- Produced by: Helmut Eweler; Franz Tappers
- Starring: Hans Moser; Käthe Haack; Hilde Schneider
- Cinematography: Willy Winterstein
- Edited by: Munni Obal
- Music by: Fritz Wenneis
- Production company: Majestic Film
- Distributed by: Tobis Film
- Release date: 29 November 1935
- Running time: 85 minutes
- Country: Germany
- Language: German

The Schimeck Family (German: Familie Schimek) is a 1935 German comedy film directed by E.W. Emo and starring Hans Moser, Käthe Haack and Hilde Schneider. It was shot at Johannisthal Studios in Berlin. The film's sets were designed by the art directors Karl Böhm and Heinrich Richter. It is based on the play The Schimek Family by Gustaf Kadelburg, previously adapted into a 1926 silent film and later into a 1957 Austrian film.

== Synopsis ==
In Berlin in 1908, three children go to live with their aunt and uncle after the death of their father.

== Cast ==
- Hans Moser as Ludwig Schigl
- Käthe Haack as Frau Schimek
- Hilde Schneider as Hedwig, ihre Nichte
- Hans Adalbert Schlettow as Franz Baumann, Tischlergeselle
- Grethe Weiser as Cilli Kaltenbach
- Fritz Odemar as Anton Kaltenbach
- Cecile Gehlers as Ilse, Cillis Freundin
- Wilhelm Bendow as Weigel, Kaltenbachs Kompagnon
- Eduard von Winterstein as Gerichtsvorsitzender
- Heinrich Schroth as Der Staatsanwalt
- Philipp Manning as Der Justizrat
- Hans Sternberg as Friesecke, Droschkenkutscher
- Günther Großkopf as Willi, Hedwigs Neffe
- Horst Teetzmann as Franzl, Hedwigs Neffe
- Egon Brosig as Tänzer
- Ernst Reißig a Pasternak, Theaterportier
- Margarete Hoffmann as Garderobiere

== Bibliography ==
- Bock, Hans-Michael & Bergfelder, Tim. The Concise CineGraph. Encyclopedia of German Cinema. Berghahn Books, 2009.
- Klaus, Ulrich J. Deutsche Tonfilme: Jahrgang 1935. Klaus-Archiv, 1988.
- Rentschler, Eric. The Ministry of Illusion: Nazi Cinema and Its Afterlife. Harvard University Press, 1996.
- Waldman, Harry. Nazi Films in America, 1933–1942. McFarland, 2008.
