= Six Days of Leave =

1941 film

- Directed by: Jürgen von Alten
- Written by: Walter Forster; Rudo Ritter
- Produced by: Felix Pfitzner
- Starring: Gustav Fröhlich; Maria Andergast; Käthe Haack
- Cinematography: Otto Baecker
- Edited by: Willy Zeunert
- Music by: Edmund Nick
- Production company: Cine-Allianz
- Distributed by: Panorama-Film
- Release date: 3 October 1941
- Running time: 98 minutes
- Country: Germany
- Language: German

Six Days of Leave (German: Sechs Tage Heimaturlaub) is a 1941 German romance film directed by Jürgen von Alten and starring Gustav Fröhlich, Maria Andergast and Käthe Haack. It was shot at the Althoff Studios in Berlin. The film's sets were designed by the art directors Karl Böhm and Robert A. Dietrich.

== Synopsis ==
Agnes, a seamstress in Berlin, sends a goodwill package to a soldier serving on the front lines in the Second World War, partly in the hope of finding a husband. However rather than sending her own picture with the parcel, she sends a glamorous image she cuts out of a magazine. When Werner Holt, who receives the package, gets six days of leave from the Wehrmacht he wants to meet up with Agnes. However, trapped in her deception she continues to offer more lies, jeopardising their chance of happiness.

== Cast ==
- Gustav Fröhlich as Unteroffizier Werner Holt
- Maria Andergast as Agnes Forbach
- Käthe Haack as Frau Walter
- Hilde Sessak as Sybille Fabius
- Wilhelm Althaus as Hauptmann Walter
- Lotte Werkmeister as Frau Kabutzke
- Hildegard Grethe as Frau Holt
- Lotte Spira as Frau Fabius
- Günther Lüders as Willi Schmitz
- Erich Ziegel as Dr. Bergmann
- Annemarie Schäfer as Anna de Solo
- Walter Bechmann as Professor
- Oskar Ballhaus as Gefreiter Keßler
- Lutz Götz as Schütze Huber
- Horst Birr as Schütze Ballhaus
- Werner Stock as Schütze Schmittke
- Rudolf Klicks as Lehrling in der Redaktion
- Karl Schmitt-Walter as Sänger
- Elmer Bantz as Nachrichtensprecher
- Lula von Sachnowsky as Solotänzerin

== Bibliography ==
- Bock, Hans-Michael & Bergfelder, Tim. The Concise CineGraph. Encyclopedia of German Cinema. Berghahn Books, 2009.
- Moeller, Felix. The Film Minister: Goebbels and the Cinema in the Third Reich. Edition Axel Menges, 2000.
