= The Broken Jug (film) =

1937 film

- German film poster
- German: Der zerbrochene Krug
- Directed by: Gustav Ucicky
- Written by: Thea von Harbou
- Based on: The Broken Jug by Heinrich von Kleist
- Produced by: Karl Julius Fritzsche; Fritz Klotsch
- Starring: Emil Jannings; Friedrich Kayßler; Max Gülstorff; Lina Carstens
- Cinematography: Fritz Arno Wagner
- Edited by: Arnfried Heyne
- Music by: Wolfgang Zeller
- Production company: Tobis Film
- Distributed by: Tobis Film
- Release date: 19 October 1937
- Running time: 86 minutes
- Country: Nazi Germany
- Language: German
- Budget: $350,000

The Broken Jug (German: Der zerbrochene Krug) is a 1937 German historical comedy film directed by Gustav Ucicky and starring Emil Jannings, Friedrich Kayßler and Max Gülstorff. It is an adaptation of the play The Broken Jug by Heinrich von Kleist. The film was a favorite of Adolf Hitler.

It was shot partly at the Johannisthal Studios in Berlin. The film's sets were designed by the art director Robert Herlth. It premiered at the Ufa-Palast am Zoo.

== Plot ==
A village judge is trying a case to determine who broke the jug. Long before the evidence becomes conclusive against the suspects, it becomes apparent that the judge himself is the guilty one.

== Cast ==
- Emil Jannings as Adam
- Friedrich Kayßler as Walter
- Max Gülstorff as Licht
- Lina Carstens as Marthe Rull
- Angela Salloker as Eva Rull
- Bruno Hübner as Veit Tümpel
- Paul Dahlke as Ruprecht Tümpel
- Elisabeth Flickenschildt as Frau Brigitte
- Walter Werner as operator
- Erich Dunskus as beadle
- Gisela von Collande as Grethe
- Lotte Rausch as Liese
- Käthe Kamossa as villager

== Reception ==
Karl Wilhelm Krause stated that The Broken Jug was among the films Adolf Hitler would watch when he was in a bad mood.

== Works cited ==
- Niven, Bill (2018). Hitler and Film: The Führer's Hidden Passion. Yale University Press. ISBN 9780300200362.
