= Axel Eggebrecht =

German journalist, writer and screenwriter

Axel Constantin August Eggebrecht
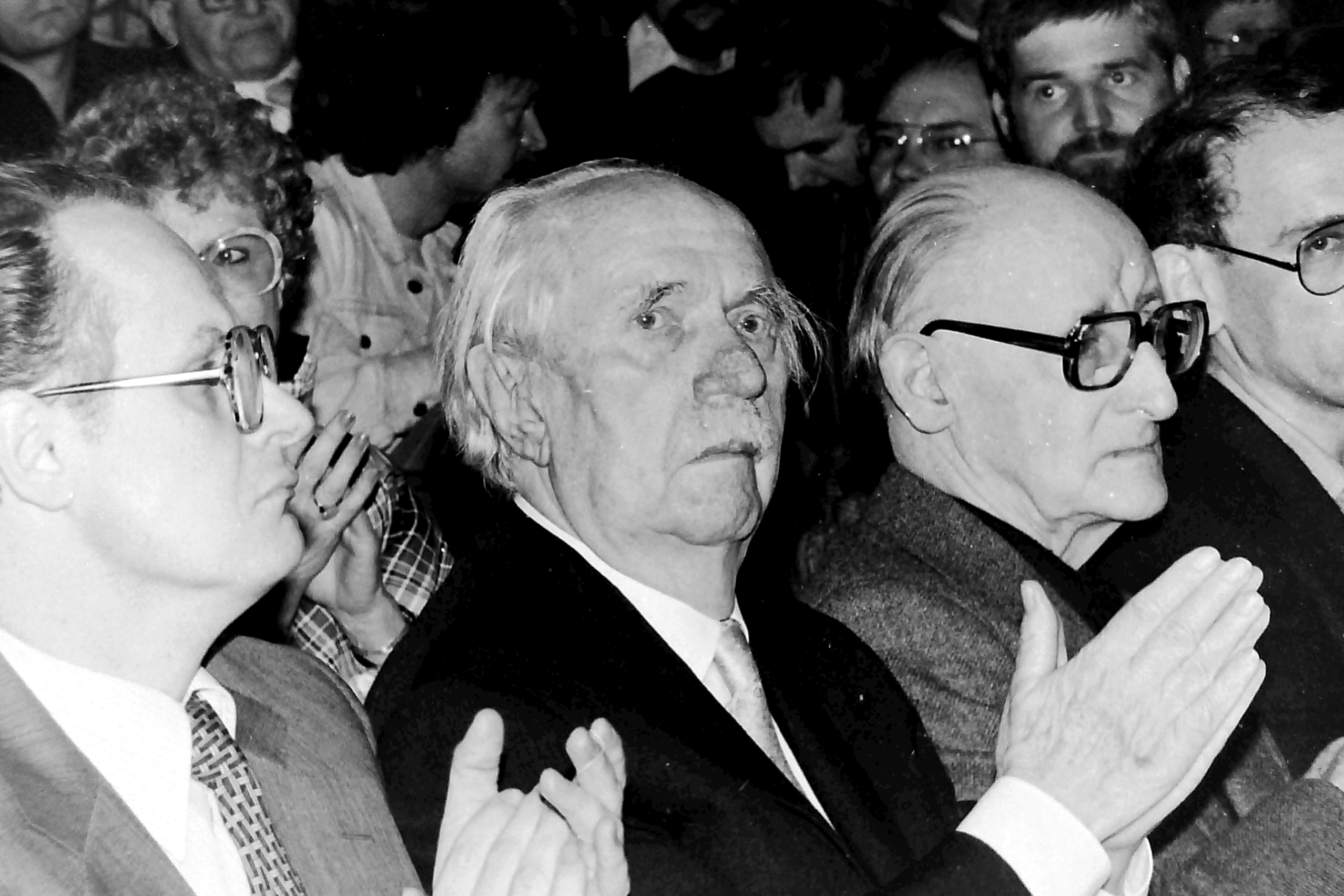
- Axel Eggebrecht (right) with Fritz Eberhard (center) and Peter Glotz (left).
- Born: 10 January 1899 Leipzig, German empire
- Died: July 14, 1991 (aged 92) Hamburg, Germany
- Occupation: Journalist; writer; screenwriter
- Genre: Non-fiction
- Subject: Politics; social issues; history
- Years active: 1925–1991

Axel Constantin August Eggebrecht (10 January 1899 – 14 July 1991) was a German journalist, writer, and screenwriter.

== Life ==
Eggebrecht grew up in bourgeois surroundings in Leipzig until 1917 when he volunteered to serve in the First World War where he received a serious wound, the effects of which he would continue to feel for his entire life. Indecisive politically, he alternated between right and left. After the war he was a member of nationalist organizations. From 1920 to 1925 he was a member of the KPD (Communist Party of Germany), traveling twice to the Soviet Union in 1923 and 1924, but he returned to Berlin disappointed in Bolshevism.

In 1925 he began his work with Siegfried Jacobsohn's Die Weltbühne, besides which he also wrote for the Literarische Welt. In Berlin, he was one of the inhabitants of the so-called Künstlerkolonie Berlin, a housing complex in southeastern Berlin constructed for the purpose of providing financially insecure writers and artists with affordable housing. In 1933 he was imprisoned for several months at the Hainewalde concentration camp. After his release he used pseudonyms to eke out a living in the film industry as a screenwriter, assistant, and critic.

After the end of the Second World War, in June 1945, he was brought by British occupation officers to the former site of the governmental broadcast station. There, in September 1945 he was one of the founders of the Nordwestdeutscher Rundfunk (Northwest German Broadcasting). As a journalist, Eggebrecht was one of the pioneers of the radio documentary. From 1963 to 1965 he reported on the Frankfurt Auschwitz Trials.

In 1965 he became a member of the International PEN association, in 1972 becoming Vice President of the German branch. In 1983 he was awarded the Gerrit-Engelke-Preis, the literature prize of the city of Hanover. In 1989, he received the Bürgermeister-Stolten-Medaille, the highest honor awarded by the city of Hamburg, where he later died.

== Axel Eggebrecht Prize ==
In Eggebrecht's memory, the Media Foundation of the City of Leipzig endowed the Axel Eggebrecht Prize to be awarded for radio documentaries. Since 2008, it is awarded every two years, alternating with the Günter Eich Prize for radio dramas. Both prizes award 10,000 Euros.

== Selected filmography ==
- Two Under the Stars (1927)
- The Republic of Flappers (1928)
- Fight of the Tertia (1929)
- Pappi (1934)
- Miss Madame (1934)
- The Valley of Love (1935)
- Maria the Maid (1936)
- When the Cock Crows (1936)
- The Adventurer of Paris (1936)
- The Girl with a Good Reputation (1938)
- Operetta (1940)
- Vienna Blood (1942)
- A Man Like Maximilian (1945)
- The Lost One (1951)
- The Land of Smiles (1952)
- Captain Wronski (1954)
- A Love Story (1954)
- The Ambassador's Wife (1955)
- Stresemann (1957)
- Wer überlebt, ist schuldig (1960, TV film)
- Der Röhm-Putsch (1967, TV film)
- In Sachen Erzberger gegen Helfferich (1967, TV film)
