= Robert Wolfgang Schnell =

German writer (1916–1986)

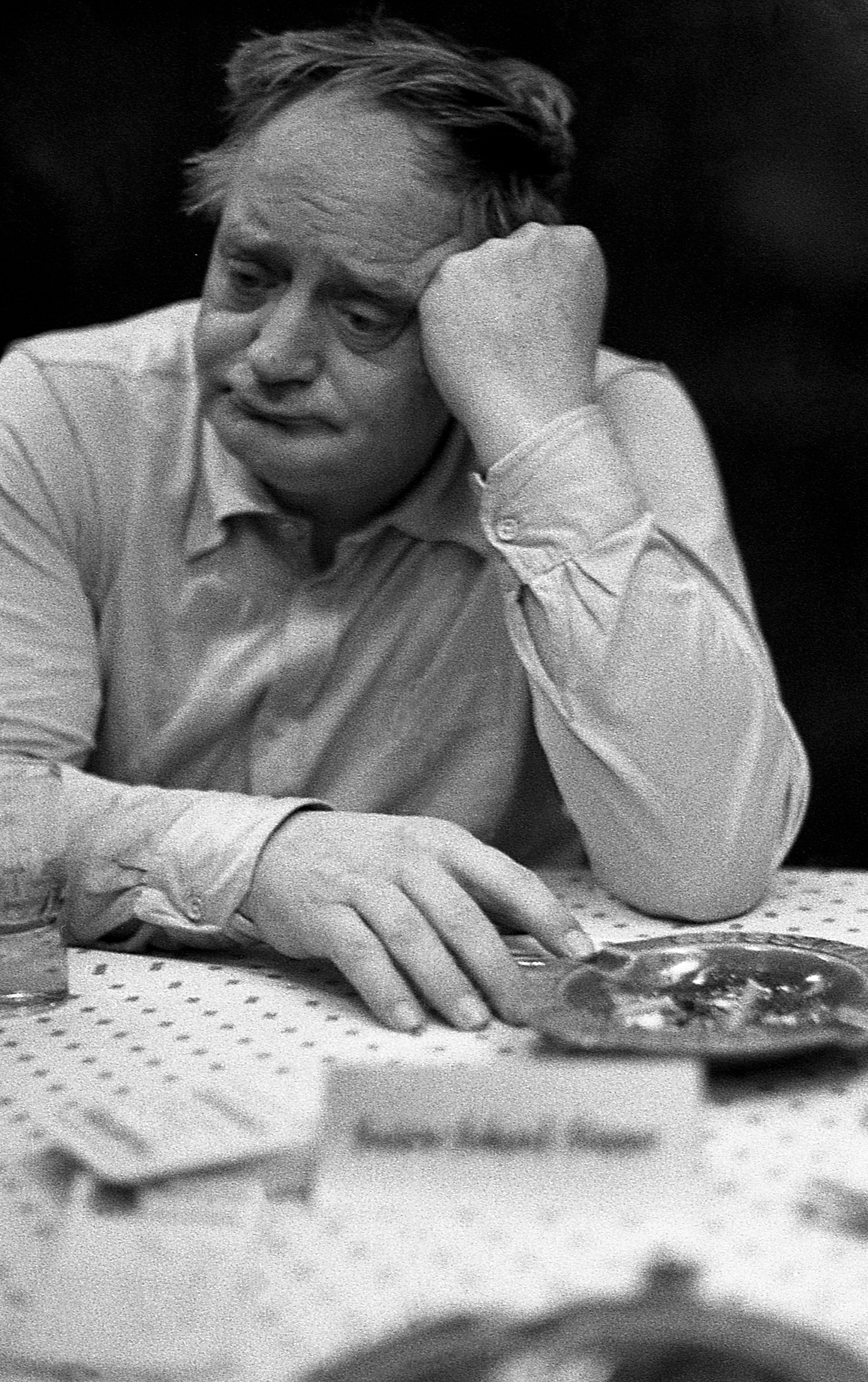
- Robert Wolfgang Schnell in 1974
- Born: March 8, 1916; Berlin-Westend, Kingdom of Prussia, German Empire
- Died: August 1, 1986 (aged 70); West Berlin, West Germany
- Occupation: Writer

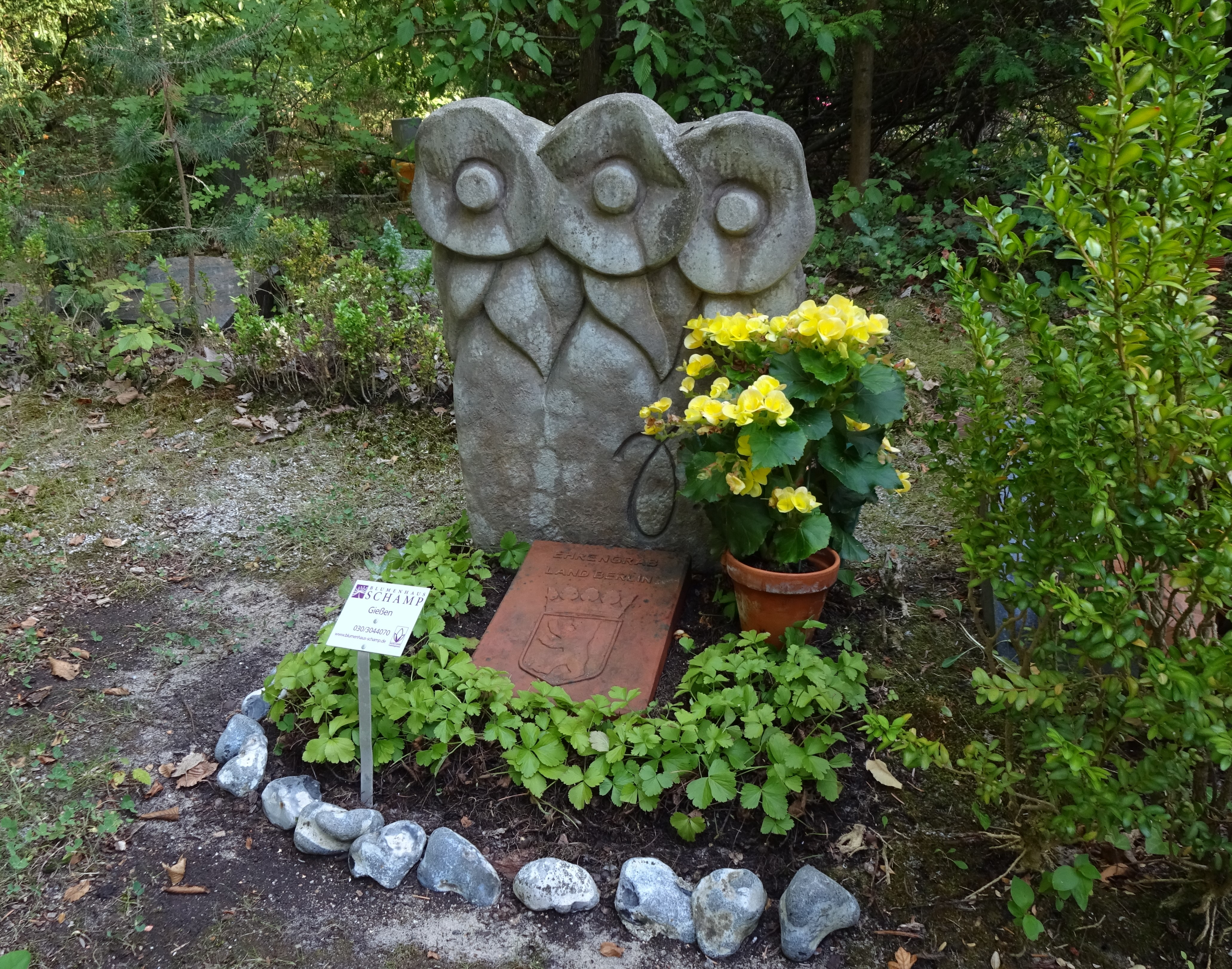
Robert Wolfgang Schnell's grave in Ruhleben cemetery, Berlin-Westend

Robert Wolfgang Schnell (March 8, 1916 – August 1, 1986) was a German writer.

== Life ==
Robert Wolfgang Schnell was born in Barmen, Germany, into a middle-class family; his father was a bank clerk. He studied music and taught himself painting. The Nazis refused him admission as a painter in the Reich Chamber of Fine Arts. During Nazi rule, he worked as a laborer, then as a laboratory technician and was conscripted into the tax office in the city of Mülheim an der Ruhr. Activities as a stage manager at the theater in Schneidemühl and as an opera director in The Hague followed. A four-month period as a soldier ended in January 1945 by his desertion.

After the end of World War II Schnell was working as a part-time actor. He founded and directed the "Ruhrkammerspiele", a theater group, and was director at the Deutsches Theater in Berlin. In the following years, he worked in various activities, among other things he was a member of the satirical magazine " Ulenspiegel". In 1959 he founded with Günter Bruno Fuchs, the painter Sigurd Kuschnerus and Günter Anlauf the in Berlin-Kreuzberg based "Zinke (Galerie)" which continued until 1962. In the "Neuer Friedrichshagener" circle of poets he was an honorary member. From then on until his death he lived as a freelance writer, painter and actor in Berlin-Charlottenburg. Nationwide, he was known in 1978 for his guest role as a port pastor in the television series MS Franziska.

Robert Wolfgang Schnell was a writer first and foremost an author conventionally-realistic narrated novels and short stories, in which preferably "little people" and outsiders were described in their Berlin environment which to the author presented a counterpoint to the critically viewed contemporary society. Schnelle, a member of the PEN Centre Germany received in 1970 the "Eduard von der Heydt" Culture Prize of the city of Wuppertal.

He is the father of filmmaker Reinald Schnell.

His final resting place is in a specially marked grave, an "Ehrengrab" of the city of Berlin in the state-owned cemetery Ruhleben, entry XXIV-192nd

== Works ==
- Wahre Wiedergabe der Welt. Lama, München 1961 (=Bücherei Tintenfisch Band 3), [ISBN unspecified]
- Mief, Erzählungen. Luchterhand, Neuwied am Rhein und Berlin 1963, [ISBN unspecified] (1969 als Sonderausgabe bei Luchterhand mit dem Titel Die Farce von den Riesenbrüsten)
- Geisterbahn, Ein Nachschlüssel zum Berliner Leben. Neuwied am Rhein / Berlin 1964, [ISBN unspecified] (1973 als Taschenbuch in der Sammlung Luchterhand 135)
- Muzes Flöte, Gedichte – Erzählungen – Zeichnungen. Luchterhand, Neuwied am Rhein / Berlin 1966, [ISBN unspecified] (1968 auch als Fischer Taschenbuch 944)
- Erziehung durch Dienstmädchen. Luchterhand, Neuwied am Rhein / Berlin 1968, [ISBN unspecified] (1978 als Taschenbuch in der Sammlung Luchterhand 180)
- Das Leben ist gesichert. Frankfurt a.M. [u. a.] 1968
- Bonko, Ein Bilderbuch für Kinder. Middelhauve, Köln 1969 (zusammen mit Józef Wilkoń)
- Pulle und Pummi, Ein Roman für Kinder. Middelhauve, Köln 1969 (= Middelhauve Kinderbücherei 5), 1972 als dtv 7049 und 1995 als Fischer Taschenbuch 80075
- Junggesellen-Weihnacht, Erzählungen. Luchterhand, Neuwied am Rhein / Berlin 1970, [ISBN unspecified]
- Ein Eisbär in Berlin. Berlin 1973
- Das verwandelte Testament, (Erzählungen). Hammer, Wuppertal 1973, [ISBN unspecified]
- Vier Väter, (mit Zeichnungen des Autors). Eremiten, Düsseldorf 1973, ISBN 3-87365-045-2 (= Broschur 47)
- Des Försters tolle Uhr, Ein Roman für Kinder. Fackelträger, Hannover 1974
- Holger wohnt im Zoo, Ein Roman für Kinder. Middelhauve, Köln 1974 (= Middelhauve Kinderbücherei 10) 1979 als DTV-Taschenbuch 7369
- Eine Tüte Himbeerbonbons, Geschichten. Luchterhand, Darmstadt / Neuwied am Rhein 1976, ISBN 3-472-61208-8 (= Sammlung Luchterhand 208)
- Die heitere Freiheit und Gleichheit, Vier Geschichten von der festen Bindung. Wagenbach, Berlin 1978, ISBN 3-8031-0095-X (= Quartheft 95)
- Rede zur Eröffnung der neuen Buchhandlung Hoffmann. Hoffmann, Eutin 1978 (= Privatdruck)
- Straßenbahn und Kuckucksuhr, Erzählungen. Eulenspiegel, Berlin (DDR) 1979, [ISBN unspecified]
- Triangel eines Fleischers, (Bayreuther Tage). LCB-Edition, Berlin 1981, ISBN 3-920392-74-4 (= LCB-Editionen 64)
- Sind die Bären glücklicher geworden? Fünfzehn Autobiographien. Wagenbach, Berlin 1983, ISBN 3-8031-2098-5 (= Wagenbachs Taschenbücherei 98)
- Der Weg einer Pastorin ins Bordell, Erzählungen. Luchterhand, Darmstadt / Neuwied am Rhein 1984, ISBN 3-472-86589-X
- Der Wagen mit dem Flaschenbier. Polyphem, Berlin 1986

== Translations into German ==
- Leo Lionni: Alexander und die Aufziehmaus, Köln 1971
- Leo Lionni: Das größte Haus der Welt, Köln 1969
- Leo Lionni: Im Kaninchengarten, Köln 1976

== Single Editions ==
- Volume 1: Mief. Erzählungen I. (not yet published)
- Volume 2: Geisterbahn. Ein Nachschlüssel zum Berliner Leben. (not yet published)
- Volume 3: Muzes Flöte. (not yet published)
- Volume 4: Erziehung durch Dienstmädchen. Roman. Berlin 2005, ISBN 3-936324-18-2
- Volume 5: Erschliessung der Wirklichkeit. Gedichte. Berlin 2006, ISBN 3-936324-19-0
- Volume 6: Junggesellen-Weihnacht. Erzählungen II. (not yet published)
- Volume 7: Eine Tüte Himbeerbonbons. Erzählungen III. (not yet published)
- Volume 8: Der Weg einer Pastorin ins Bordell. (not yet published)
- Volume 9: Kinderbücher. (not yet published)
- Volume 10: Das Leben des Heiligen Hermann Katz. Roman. Berlin 2006, ISBN 3-936324-97-2

== Secondary Literature ==
- Robert Wolfgang Schnell: Maler, Schriftsteller, Schauspieler. Edition Berlin 750, Berlin 1984
- Robert Wolfgang Schnell zum siebzigsten Geburtstag, Herausgegeben von seinen Freunden. Verlag schwarz auf weiss, Barmen / Bayreuth / Berlin 1986
- Jörg Aufenanger: Gedenken an den Poeten bei Erbsensuppe und Bier. In: Wuppertaler Zeitung, 20. Dezember 2000.
- Michael Fisch: Bibliographie Robert Wolfgang Schnell. Bielefeld 1999, ISBN 3-89528-262-6 (=Bibliographien zur deutschen Literaturgeschichte, Band 9)
- Hans Albrecht Koch: Bibliographie Robert Wolfgang Schnell. In: Informationsmittel für Bibliotheken 8 (2000) S. 1–4
- Bernt Ture von zur Mühlen: Bibliographien im Aisthesis Verlag: Brinkmann, Heißenbüttel, Piontek und Schnell. In: Börsenblatt für den Deutschen Buchhandel 34, 27. April 2001, S. 247
- Michael Fisch: Autorenporträt. In: Thomas Kraft (Hrsg.): Lexikon der deutschsprachigen Gegenwartsliteratur. Nymphenburger, München 2003, ISBN 3-485-00989-X, S. 1135–1137
- Ralph Gerstenberg: Von der Wupper an die Spree. Ein Berliner Verlag entdeckt die Bücher von Robert Wolfgang Schnell wieder – pünktlich zu seinem 20. Todestag. In: tip, Nr. 16/2006, S. 67
- Ralph Gerstenberg: Boheme und Klassenkampf – Der Schriftsteller Robert Wolfgang Schnell, Interview mit dem Herausgeber Michael Fisch über Leben und Werk von Robert Wolfgang Schnell. In: Deutschlandfunk am 1. August 2006
- Ralph Gerstenberg: Robert Wolfgang Schnell: Das Leben des Heiligen Hermann Katz – Dritter Band der Werkausgabe. In: Deutschlandfunk am 8. August 2006
- Andreas Schäfer: Denken, schreiben, trinken – Wie die Boheme nach Kreuzberg fand.. In: Tagesspiegel, 6. August 2006, S. 27.
- Ole Petras: An den Denkmälern der Zeit – Zu Robert Wolfgang Schnells Gedichtband Erschließung der Wirklichkeit. In: literaturkritik.de 4 (April) 2007 (online-Ausgabe)
- Uwe Eckhardt: Der Schriftsteller und Maler Robert Wolfgang Schnell (1916–1986) und seine Heimatstadt Wuppertal. Anmerkungen und Materialien. In: Geschichte im Wuppertal 21 (2012), S. 91–110.
