= August Wünsche =

- Born: August 22, 1838
- Died: November 15, 1912 (aged 74)
- Writing career
- Language: German
- Genre: Non-fiction

Karl August Wünsche (August 22, 1838, Hainewalde bei Zittau - November 15, 1912, Dresden) was a German Christian Hebraist.

He devoted his attention almost exclusively to rabbinic literature. After completing his commentaries on the Book of Hosea (1868) and Book of Joel (1872), he wrote Neue Beiträge zur Erläuterung der Evangelien aus Talmud und Midrasch (1878), the most complete collection of the parallel passages of the Talmud and the New Testament since the works of John Lightfoot and Johann Christian Schöttgen.

In his Bibliotheca Rabbinica (Leipzig, 1880–85) he made a German translation of the whole of the Midrash Rabbah and the Midrash to the Five Megillot, and he also translated haggadic portions of the Jerusalem Talmud (1880) and of the Babylonian Talmud (1886–89), as well as the Pesiḳta (1885) and the Midrash to the Psalms (1891).

Smaller works of his are:

- Die Rätselweisheit bei den Hebräern (1883)
- Die Freude im Alten Testament (1896); "Naturbildersprache des Alten Testaments" (1897)
- Die Schönheit der Bibel (Leipzig, 1905)

Together with Jakob Winter he compiled the Geschichte der Jüdischen Litteratur (3 vols., Leipzig, 1892–95).
