= Minerva Tonfilm =

German film company

Minerva Tonfilm (German: Minerva-Tonfilm) was a German film production company active during the 1930s. Founded in 1934 by the film producer Curt Prickler amongst others, it functioned as an independent production outfit. Minerva shot its films in a variety of Berlin studios and they were distributed by Terra Film or Tobis Film. Included in these were propaganda films reflecting Nazi Party ideology such as Togger (1937). It ultimately ceased production in 1939. This took place against the backdrop of the growing centralisation of German film production under the direction of the Reich Film Chamber and the Minister of Propaganda Joseph Goebbels.

== Selected filmography ==
- Charley's Aunt (1934)
- Lessons in Love (1935)
- The Valiant Navigator (1935)
- Victoria (1935)
- Maria the Maid (1936)
- Susanne in the Bath (1936)
- Stronger Than Regulations (1936)
- Alarm in Peking (1937)
- Heimweh (1937)
- Togger (1937)
- The Girl with a Good Reputation (1938)
- Scheidungsreise (1938)
- You and I (1938)

== Bibliography ==
- Giesen, Rolf. Nazi Propaganda Films: A History and Filmography. McFarland, 2003.
- Klaus, Ulrich J. Deutsche Tonfilme: Jahrgang 1939. Klaus-Archiv, 1988.
- Petley, Julian. Capital and Culture: German Cinema, 1933–45. British Film Institute, 1979.
