= Karlheinz Lemken =

German actor

- Born: 1946 (age 79–80); Oberhausen, Germany
- Occupation: Actor
- Years active: 1972- ( TV)

Karlheinz Lemken is a German television actor.

He is married to the actress Andrea Dahmen, with whom he had a daughter Julia Dahmen who is also an actress.

== Filmography ==
Year	Title	Role	Notes
1972	Dear Mother, I'm All Right	Second Guest	Uncredited
1975	Knife in the Back	Bordellangestellter	
1978	Winterspelt 1944	Oberfeldwebel Wagner	
1988	The Great Escape II: The Untold Story	Herr Schmidt	TV movie
2010	Dreimaldraussen	Joachim Winkler	
2015	Das kalte Gericht	Dr. Berger	(final film role)

== Bibliography ==
- Charles P. Mitchell. The Hitler Filmography: Worldwide Feature Film and Television Miniseries Portrayals, 1940 through 2000. McFarland, 2002.
