= Charley's Aunt (1934 film) =

1934 film directed by Robert A. Stemmle

- Directed by: Robert A. Stemmle
- Written by: Brandon Thomas (play); Robert A. Stemmle
- Produced by: Curt Prickler
- Starring: Fritz Rasp; Paul Kemp; Max Gülstorff
- Cinematography: Carl Drews
- Music by: Harald Böhmelt
- Production company: Minerva Tonfilm
- Release date: 17 August 1934
- Running time: 91 minutes
- Country: Germany
- Language: German

Charley's Aunt (German: Charleys Tante) is a 1934 German comedy film directed by Robert A. Stemmle and starring Fritz Rasp, Paul Kemp, and Max Gülstorff. It is based on the British writer Brandon Thomas's 1892 play Charley's Aunt. The film's sets were designed by art director Franz Schroedter.

== Cast ==
- Fritz Rasp as Lord Babberley
- Paul Kemp as Fancourt 'Babbs' Babberley
- Max Gülstorff as Sir Francis Chesney
- Albert Lieven as Jack Chesney
- Erik Ode as Charley Wykeham
- Paul Henckels as Stephan Spettik
- Jessie Vihrog as Amy
- Carola Höhn as Kitty
- Ida Wüst as Donna Lucia d'Alvadorez
- Vilma Bekendorf as Ela Delahey
- Fita Benkhoff as Mary Fin
- Fritz Odemar as Bressett
- Ernst Legal as Nelson
- Ernst Nessler as Aristophan
- Charlotte Berlow as Miss Bedford
- Henry Pauly as Smith
- Rudolf Platte as Shipmaker

== Bibliography ==
- Bock, Hans-Michael; Bergfelder, Tim, eds. (2009). The Concise Cinegraph: Encyclopaedia of German Cinema. New York: Berghahn Books. ISBN 978-1-57181-655-9.
