= Stronger Than Regulations =

1936 film

- Directed by: Jürgen von Alten
- Written by: Felix Helmer (play); Curt J. Braun
- Produced by: Curt Prickler
- Starring: Paul Hartmann; Karl Hellmer; Manja Behrens
- Cinematography: Georg Bruckbauer
- Edited by: Axel von Werner
- Music by: Rudolf Perak
- Production company: Minerva Tonfilm
- Distributed by: Europa Film
- Release date: 27 August 1936
- Country: Germany
- Language: German

Stronger Than Regulations (German: Stärker als Paragraphen) is a 1936 German mystery film directed by Jürgen von Alten and starring Paul Hartmann, Karl Hellmer and Manja Behrens. It was shot at the Grunewald Studios in Berlin. The film's sets were designed by the art directors Otto Guelstorff and Hans Minzloff.

== Cast ==
- Paul Hartmann as Lawyer Dr. Birk
- Karl Hellmer as Theodor Hubricht - Geldvermittler
- Manja Behrens as Renate - seine Nichte
- Maria Krahn as Christine - Wirtschafterin bei Hubricht
- Aribert Wäscher as Bankier Lörik
- Hilde von Stolz as Frau Lörik
- Ursula Herking as Tochter des Portiers
- Walter Franck as Prosecutor
- Karel Stepanek as Robert Wendland
- F.W. Schröder-Schrom as Dr. Krüger
- Walter Werner as Judge
- Carl Auen as Prosecutor
- Fredy Barten as Diener
- Jac Diehl
- Fritz Draeger as Gerichtsreporter
- Kurt Felden
- Gerdi Gerdt as Zofe
- Oskar Höcker
- Ellen-Ruth Knapp-Güttingen as Freundin
- Viggo Larsen
- Alfred Peters as Beigeordneter
- Fredy Rolf
- Just Scheu as Defense lawyer
- Wera Schultz as Krankenschwester
- Wolfgang Staudte as Freund der Portierstochter
- Jörn Valery
- Michael von Newlinsky as Gast
- Eduard Wenck

== Bibliography ==
- Klaus, Ulrich J. Deutsche Tonfilme: Jahrgang 1936. Klaus-Archiv, 1988.
- Waldman, Harry. Nazi Films in America, 1933–1942. McFarland, 2008.
