= Susanne in the Bath =

1936 film

- Directed by: Jürgen von Alten
- Written by: Walter Forster; Jürgen von Alten
- Produced by: Curt Prickler
- Starring: Manja Behrens; Max Gülstorff; Erich Fiedler
- Cinematography: Günther Anders; Kurt Fischer
- Music by: Harald Böhmelt
- Production company: Minerva Tonfilm
- Distributed by: Tobis Film; Sascha Film (Austria)
- Release date: 31 December 1936
- Running time: 78 minutes
- Country: Germany
- Language: German

Susanne in the Bath (German: Susanne im Bade) is a 1936 German comedy film directed by Jürgen von Alten and starring Manja Behrens, Max Gülstorff and Erich Fiedler. The title is an allusion to the biblical story of Susanna.

The film's sets were designed by the art director Gustav A. Knauer.

== Cast ==
- Manja Behrens as Gussy Alfken
- Max Gülstorff as Hofrat Alfken, ihr Vater
- Erich Fiedler as Bruno Kanitz, Gussys Bräutigam
- Ursula Herking as Kunstschülerin Hampelmann
- Erika von Thellmann as Kunstschülerin Erika Knispel
- Walter Werner as Direktor Knispel, Erikas Vater
- Hans Schlenck as Maler Schrack, Lehrer an der Kunstschule
- Hans Brausewetter as Kunstschüler Peter
- Maria Sazarina as Kunstschülerin Barbara
- Hanns Farenburg as Justizrat Schmidt
- Maria Krahn as Frau Justizrat Schmidt
- Ilse Fürstenberg as Reinemachefrau
- Ewald Wenck as Schuldiener Lemcke
- Fritz Hoopts as Hein, ein alter Fischer
- Renate Roland as Schülerin
- Edith Meinel as Schülerin Inge
- Ingrid Edelhof as Schülerin
- Hans Baumann as Der Lehrer
- Jochen Hauer as Schüler
- Günther Vogdt as Kunstschüler
- Wolfgang Staudte as Schüler Fritz

== Bibliography ==
- Waldman, Harry. Nazi Films in America, 1933–1942. McFarland, 2008.
