= Togger (film) =

1937 film

- Directed by: Jürgen von Alten
- Written by: Heinz Bierkowski; Walter Forster
- Produced by: Curt Prickler
- Starring: Paul Hartmann; Renate Müller; Heinz Salfner; Paul Otto
- Cinematography: Reimar Kuntze; Benno Stinauer
- Edited by: Roger von Norman
- Music by: Henri Rene
- Production company: Minerva Tonfilm
- Distributed by: Tobis Film; Tobis-Sascha Film (Austria)
- Release date: 12 February 1937
- Running time: 99 minutes
- Country: Germany
- Language: German

Togger is a 1937 German drama film directed by Jürgen von Alten and starring Paul Hartmann, Renate Müller, Heinz Salfner. It was shot at the Johannisthal Studios in Berlin and on location at the headquarters of the Ullstein Publishing House in the city. The film's sets were designed by the art directors Gustav A. Knauer and Alexander Mügge. The film conforms to Nazi propaganda about the dangers of international (likely Jewish) big business. The Minister of Propaganda Joseph Goebbels was critical of the film which he considered "too rigid" and it was not a success at the box office. It was Müller's final film before her mysterious death the same year. The making of the film was portrayed in the 1960 film Sweetheart of the Gods.

== Synopsis ==
In the era of the Weimar Republic, a major international financial syndicate the Reuler Group is attempting to buy up all the newspapers in the city in order to shape public opinion to their will. Only a single figure has the courage to stand up to this takeover, the newspaper editor Togger whose publication holds out against the cartel under enormous pressure. Assisted by his star investigative journalist Hanna Breitenbach he takes the fight to the enemy.

== Selected cast ==
- Paul Hartmann as Chefredakteur Togger
- Renate Müller as Hanna Breitenbach
- Heinz Salfner as Professor Breitenbach
- Paul Otto as Rudolf Breitenbach
- Mathias Wieman as Peter Geis, journalist
- Hilde Seipp as Maira de Costa
- Fritz Odemar as Mariano
- Ernst Waldow as Agent Rakovicz
- Fritz Rasp as Dublanc
- Ursula Herking as bar servant Fiffi
- Volker von Collande as editor Hallmann
- Carl Auen as detective
- Fredy Barten as waiter
- Walter Bechmann as Government official
- Fritz Berghof as journalist at the Ministerial Conference
- Hellmuth Bergmann as Chairman of the journalists at Reuler Group
- Eduard Bornträger as cultural journalist at the "New Day"
- Peter Busse as Romanian journalist
- Ellinor Büller as guest at Maria de Costa
- Bernhard Caspar as typesetter at the print shop
- Kurt Cramer as journalist
- Gustaf Dennert as Romanian journalist
- Fritz Dernburg as publishing director
- Fritz Draeger as a spectator at the bike race
- Hanns Farenburg as a ministerial councilor
- Angelo Ferrari as Italian journalist
- Karl Fochler as guest at Maria de Costa
- Walter Franck as Berg, editor of the "New Day"
- Gerdi Gerdt as smoking girl
- Reinhold Gronert as Ein streikender Setzer bei Breitenbach
- Illo Gutschwager as Taxi driver
- Karl Hannemann as Member of Parliament
- Emmy Harold as Dublanc's secretary
- Karl Hellmer as Polle, editor of the "New Day"
- Alfred Heynisch as company's manager of the "New Day"
- Hans Ludwig Hilmers as Ein streikender Arbeiter
- Oskar Höcker as typesetter at the print shop
- Georg Kalkum as typesetter at the print shop
- Alfred Kiwitt as Weber, an editor with a toothache
- Maria Krahn as Frau Hollin, Sekretärin
- Viggo Larsen as journalist at the Ministerial conference
- Kurt Lauermann as typesetter at the print shop
- Herbert Lindner
- Hans Meyer-Hanno as agitator
- Hermann Noack as Ein weiterer Redakteur
- Klaus Pohl as foreman of the printer
- Arthur Reppert as Works council member
- André Saint-Germain as French journalist
- Walter Schenk as journalist at the Ministerial conference
- Just Scheu as journalist at the Ministerial conference
- F. W. Schröder-Schrom as Wölfer, editor of the "New Day"
- Hans Sobierayski as Polish journalist
- Wolfgang Staudte as Streikender setzer bei breitenbach
- Ernst Stimmel as proofreader
- Otz Tollen as Business section editor
- Werner Uberschär as journalist at the Ministerial conference
- Eugen von Bongardt as journalist at the Ministerial conference
- Michael von Newlinsky as journalist from the Reuler Group
- Erika von Schaper as guest at Maria de Costa
- Paul Wagner as member of the Ministerial Council
- Walter Werner as Andreas's father
- Hugo Werner-Kahle
- Paul Westermeier as ambulance man
- Eugen Worm

== Production ==
Roger von Norman edited the film.

== Works cited ==
- Niven, Bill. Hitler and Film: The Führer's Hidden Passion. Yale University Press, 2018.
- Waldman, Harry (2008). Nazi Films In America, 1933-1942. McFarland & Company. ISBN 9780786438617.
