= The Girl with a Good Reputation =

1938 film

- Directed by: Hans Schweikart
- Written by: Axel Eggebrecht; Ernst Hasselbach
- Based on: The Mistress of the Inn by Carlo Goldoni
- Produced by: Fred Lyssa; Curt Prickler
- Starring: Olga Tschechowa; Attila Hörbiger; Josef Eichheim
- Cinematography: László Schäffer; Fritz Arno Wagner
- Edited by: Fritz Stapenhorst
- Music by: Nico Dostal
- Production company: Minerva Tonfilm
- Distributed by: Tobis Film
- Release date: 25 February 1938
- Running time: 91 minutes
- Country: Germany
- Language: German

The Girl with a Good Reputation (German: Das Mädchen mit dem guten Ruf) is a 1938 German comedy film directed by Hans Schweikart and starring Olga Tschechowa, Attila Hörbiger and Josef Eichheim. It was shot at the Tempelhof Studios and Marienfelde Studios in Berlin. The film's sets were designed by the art directors Kurt Herlth and Werner Schlichting. It is based on the 1753 play The Mistress of the Inn by Carlo Goldoni, updated to the present day.

== Synopsis ==
A travelling cinema arrives in a small, Italian town. The only place suitable for the screenings is the inn run by Mirandolina, a woman with an impeccable reputation. Tino, who works for the cinema, becomes enamoured of Mirandolina but finds his advances to her hindered by her upright reputation and the rivalry of local figures.

== Cast ==
- Olga Tschechowa as Mirandolina
- Attila Hörbiger as Tino
- Josef Eichheim as Pedro
- Will Dohm as Tomasini
- Anton Pointner as Pandolfo
- Robert Dorsay as Lorenzo, Kellner
- Alexa von Porembsky as Bianca
- Franz Nicklisch as Battista
- Max Gülstorff as Lombardi
- Ernst Legal as Cosmo
- Kurt Vespermann as Olivieri
- Ilya Günten as Rosaura Pinetti
- Eugen Wieber as Losverkäufer
- Ludwig Schmitz as Loszieher
- Karl Harbacher as Gendarm
- Margarete Faas as Verwandte

== Bibliography ==
- Klaus, Ulrich J. Deutsche Tonfilme: Jahrgang 1938. Klaus-Archiv, 1988.
- Rentschler, Eric. German Film & Literature. Routledge, 2013.
- Romani, Cinzia. Tainted Goddesses : Female Film Stars of the Third Reich. Da Capo Press, 1992.
