= Andrea Dahmen =

German actress (born 1939)

- Born: 1939 (age 86–87); Germany
- Occupation: Actress
- Years active: 1964- (TV)

Andrea Dahmen (born 1939) is a German actress of stage, radio and television.

She is the daughter of the actors Josef Dahmen and Gisela von Collande. She married Karlheinz Lemken with whom she had a daughter Julia Dahmen who also became an actress.

== Bibliography ==
- Esther Pia Wipfler. Martin Luther in Motion Pictures: History of a Metamorphosis. Vandenhoeck & Ruprecht, 2011.
