= The Traitor (1936 German film) =

1936 film

- Directed by: Karl Ritter
- Written by: Walter Herzlieb; Leonhard Fürst
- Produced by: Hans Ritter
- Starring: Willy Birgel; Lída Baarová; Irene von Meyendorff
- Cinematography: Günther Anders; Heinz von Jaworsky
- Edited by: Gottfried Ritter
- Music by: Henri Rene
- Production company: UFA
- Distributed by: UFA
- Release date: 19 August 1936
- Running time: 92 minutes
- Country: Germany
- Language: German

The Traitor (German: Verräter) is a 1936 German spy thriller film directed by Karl Ritter. and starring Willy Birgel, Lída Baarová and Irene von Meyendorff. It was shot at the Babelsberg Studios in Potsdam and on location around Wünsdorf. The film's sets were designed by the art directors Franz Koehn and Max Mellin. The film revolves around foreign agents who infiltrate the German arms industry, helped by German traitors. However, they are defeated due to the combined efforts of the Wehrmacht and the Gestapo.

== Plot ==
Foreign intelligence services are stepping up their efforts to uncover the secrets of the German arms industry. First, an agent is infiltrated into a German aircraft factory by equipping him with a false identity as a fitter and the fake name "Schultz". A calm and capable man, he soon manages to become familiar with the latest aircraft models.

At the same time, the agent group in the capital Berlin places advertisements in which contacts to the industry are sought and good earning opportunities are offered. As a result, the highly indebted designer Brockau, who is desperate for new sources of income to fund the expensive needs of his pleasure-seeking girlfriend Marion, gets in touch. Brockau, the inventor of a new type of crude oil carburetor, works in the T-Metallwerke, where the latest German tank models are developed. Therefore, he is the ideal catch for the agents. Brockau gradually reveals and sells one secret after another to the agents.

Finally, the agents try to get the former banker and current tank soldier Klemm into their clutches, who is a gunner on a Panzerkampfwagen I. Klemm, who gives the agent Morris a harmless stock market tip, gets paid an alleged share of the profits from him. Later, Morris blackmails him with a fake receipt, in which Klemm allegedly confirms receipt of the money for the betrayal of state secrets. However, Klemm struggles to report the story to his superiors. These inform army counterintelligence, which in cooperation with the Gestapo has been after the agent ring for some time.

Now it is possible to gradually uncover the agents. The first to be caught is Schultz, whose false identity bursts after being checked. Schultz is still able to take off in a new dive bomber model, but is shot down on the Channel coast by a joint action of the Luftwaffe and Kriegsmarine. After that, Brockau, who was supposed to sabotage a waterworks on behalf of Morris, is caught red-handed. Morris is the next to go down. The last traitor, Geyer, escapes by train. But when he is stopped by the police, Geyer flees into a swamp, where he perishes.

The film ends with a roll call at the tank unit's barracks, where the execution of the traitor Brockau is announced. Soldier Klemm, on the other hand, receives a commendation for his courage in front of the assembled company.

== Cast ==
- Lída Baarová as Marion
- Willy Birgel as Agent Morris
- Irene von Meyendorff as Hilde Körner
- Theodor Loos as Dr. Auer
- Rudolf Fernau as Fritz Brockau
- Herbert A.E. Böhme as Agent Schultz
- Heinz Welzel as Hans Klemm
- Paul Dahlke as Agent Geyer
- Josef Dahmen as Ein Helfer
- Hans Zesch-Ballot as Dr. Wehner
- Sepp Rist as Commissioner Kilian
- Volker von Collande as Referendar Kröpke
- Ernst Karchow as Major Walen
- Siegfried Schürenberg as Lt. Col. Neumann
- Otto Graf as Captain Dressler
- Heinrich Schroth as General manager T-Metallwerke
- Karl Junge-Swinburne as Tank division commander
- Hans Henninger as Max
- Carl Auen as Detective Assmann
- Ewald Wenck as Detective Schober
- Willi Rose as Ede
- Gisela von Collande as Trude
- Ernst Behmer as Photographer
- Max Hochstetter
- Hans Meyer-Hanno
- Hans Reinhold Hauer
- Hellmuth Passarge

== Production ==
Karl Ritter directed the film. Hans Weidemann was the art director and the music was composed by Henri René.

== Release ==
The film premiered in the United States at the 86th Street Garden Theatre on 27 January 1937.

== Reception ==
The film is considered a propaganda piece. It received a special recommendation at the 4th Venice International Film Festival.

== Accolades ==
Award	Date of ceremony	Category	Recipient(s)	Result	Ref.
Venice Film Festival	31 August 1936	Special Mention	The Traitor	Won	

== Works cited ==
- Waldman, Harry (2008). Nazi Films In America, 1933-1942. McFarland & Company. ISBN 9780786438617.
