= The Fair (film) =

1960 film

- Film poster
- Directed by: Wolfgang Staudte
- Written by: Wolfgang Staudte; Claus Hubalek
- Produced by: Harald Braun; Helmut Käutner; Wolfgang Staudte
- Starring: Juliette Mayniel
- Cinematography: Georg Krause
- Edited by: Lilian Seng
- Release date: 18 August 1960
- Running time: 102 minutes
- Countries: West Germany; France
- Language: German

The Fair (German: Kirmes) is a 1960 West German drama film directed by Wolfgang Staudte. It was entered into the 10th Berlin International Film Festival where Juliette Mayniel won the Silver Bear for Best Actress.

== Cast ==
- Juliette Mayniel as Annette
- Götz George as Robert Mertens
- Hans Mahnke as Paul Mertens
- Wolfgang Reichmann as Georg Höchert
- Manja Behrens as Martha Mertens
- Fritz Schmiedel as Priest
- Erica Schramm as Eva Schumann
- Elisabeth Goebel as Wirtin Balthausen
- Benno Hoffmann as Wirt Balthausen
- Irmgard Kleber as Else Mertens
- Hansi Jochmann as Erika
- Solveig Loevel as Gertrud
