= Hilde Schneider =

German actress (1914–1961)

- Born: 24 November 1914; Baden-Baden, German Empire
- Died: 20 May 1961 (aged 46); West Berlin, West Germany
- Occupation: Actress
- Years active: 1935-1942 (film)

Hilde Schneider (1914–1961) was a German actress. She appeared in the 1939 film Shoulder Arms.

== Selected filmography ==
- The Schimeck Family (1935)
- Hilde and the Volkswagen (1936)
- There Were Two Bachelors (1936)
- Silence in the Forest (1937)
- Bachelor's Paradise (1939)
- Shoulder Arms (1939)
- Small Town Poet (1940)
- His Son (1942)

== Bibliography ==
- Richards, Jeffrey. Visions of Yesterday. Routledge & Kegan, 1973.
