= The Dreamer (1936 film) =

1936 film directed by Carl Froelich

- Directed by: Carl Froelich
- Written by: Erich Ebermayer; Robert A. Stemmle
- Based on: The Dreamer by Oskar Jerschke and Arno Holz
- Produced by: Carl Froelich
- Starring: Emil Jannings; Hilde Weissner; Harald Paulsen
- Cinematography: Reimar Kuntze
- Edited by: Gustav Lohse
- Music by: Hanson Milde-Meissner
- Production companies: Carl Froelich Film; Tobis Film
- Distributed by: Tobis Film
- Release date: 23 January 1936
- Running time: 100 minutes
- Country: Nazi Germany
- Language: German

The Dreamer (German: Traumulus) is a 1936 German historical drama film directed by Carl Froelich and starring Emil Jannings, Hilde Weissner, and Harald Paulsen. It is based on the play of the same name by German playwrights Oskar Jerschke and Arno Holz. The film's art direction was by Franz Schroedter, a leading set designer of the era. It premiered at Berlin's Ufa-Palast am Zoo.

== Plot ==
A small garrison town in northern Germany. Professor Niemeyer is the director of the local school of higher education for boys. He is nicknamed “Traumulus” ("Traum" being the German word for "dream") by his students because of his traditional views and his unworldly demeanor. His values are those of the last century, and his ideas of decency, custom and morals are no longer understood, nor shared, by the current generation of high school students. His favorite student is Kurt von Zedlitz, a descendant of an old, respected family. Once again, the young man returns to the student dormitory via a rope ladder in the early morning hours. Kurt is teased by his classmates who suspect he might be having an affair in town.

Prof. Niemeyer has prepared a festival play for the ceremony taking place the next morning on the occasion of the inauguration of a monument in honor of Kaiser Wilhelm I. After attending church, Niemeyer meets his old adversary, the District Administrator von Kannewurf. The latter has heard the rumours that Niemeyer's favorite student, Zedlitz, was spotted with alluring actress Lydia Link in the somewhat shady "Golden Peacock" bar. Hoping to give Niemeyer the shock of his life, the district administrator rubs this latest gossip in his face.

Traumulus conducts an investigation, and Kurt von Zedlitz admits to his "misdeed", conveniently omitting his subsequent visit to the lady's apartment. In doing so, Kurt is following the example of Niemeyer's son from his first marriage, Fritz Niemeyer, who leads an extremely relaxed lifestyle. Fritz Niemeyer's stepmother Jadwiga, Traumulus' second wife, regularly redeems Fritz's debts. His easygoing relationship with his father's much younger wife also gives rise to some speculation.

While the rehearsals for the Kaiser Wilhelm celebration are taking place on the market square, the members of the forbidden “Anti-Tyrannia” fraternity, mostly students and alumni of Niemeyer's school, meet in the backroom of a local bakery. When District Administrator von Kannewurf gets wind of it, he has the place raided and the participants arrested. The arrestees include Kurt von Zedlitz who, ignoring the house arrest imposed by Traumulus, joined the meeting merely to suggest that the Anti-Tyrannia group should be dissolved. Prof. Niemeyer is shocked when he learns that his favorite student is among those arrested, as he thought he was under house arrest.

Niemeyer is deeply disappointed in Zedlitz, his world is collapsing. He showers the young man with reproaches and expels him from the school. Zedlitz is in shock himself, he cannot utter a single word in his own defense and storms out of the building in confusion. From then on, Kurt von Zedlitz seems to have disappeared from the face of the earth, and even District Administrator Kannewurf is beginning to worry, resulting in a renewed altercation with Niemeyer. The latter seeks consolation from his wife Jadwiga, but she shows no interest in his problem.

Finally, the old professor learns of Kurt's pure intentions when attending the meeting in the bakery. But it is too late. He still doesn't know that Kurt killed himself. Turning to the students, the professor quickly finds the strength for a forward-looking word: "He was no hero... so steel and harden yourselves and vanquish whatever holds you back."

== Cast ==
- Emil Jannings as Direktor Prof. Niemeyer
- Hilde Weissner as Jadwiga, seine Frau
- Harald Paulsen as Fritz, sein Sohn
- Hildegard Barko as Olga, Dienstmädchen bei Niemeyer
- Paul W. Krüger as Pedell Schimke
- Hannes Stelzer as Kurt von Zedtlitz, Gymnasiast
- Hans Joachim Schaufuß as Hans Klausing, Gymnasiast
- Hans Richter as Graf Franz von Mettke, Gymnasiast
- Rolf Müller as Emmerich Frommelt, Gymnasiast
- Alexander Kraft-Hohenlohe as Erwin Putzke
- Hilde von Stolz as Lydia Link, Schauspielerin
- Herbert Hübner as Landrat von Kannewurf
- Ernst Waldow as Assessor Mollwein
- Otto Stoeckel as Polizeiinspektor Hoppe
- Bruno Fritz as Obersekretär Tamaschke
- Hugo Froelich as Schutzmann Patzkowski
- Gaston Briese as Schutzmann Bellert
- Max Rosen as Schutzmann Krebs
- Walter Steinbeck as Major Kleinstüber
- Walter Werner as Sanitätsrat Brunner
- Karl Etlinger as Fabrikant Meier
- Hans Brausewetter as Falk, Lawyer
- Harry Frank as Oberlehrer Schwenk
- Ernst Legal as Schladebach, Bäckermeister
- Else Ehser as Frl. Wetterhahn, Schneiderin
- Rolf Moebius in a bit part
- Achim Schmidt in a bit part
- Werner Vogt as Man
- Peer Baedecker as Man
- Peter Jäger as Man
- Hermann Braun as Man
- Eberhard Schott as Man
- Walter Bienenstein as Man
- Rudolf Klicks as Man

== Bibliography ==
- Hake, Sabine (2001). Popular Cinema of the Third Reich. Austin: University of Texas Press. ISBN 978-0-292-73458-6.
- Moeller, Felix; Schlöndorff, Volker (2000). The Film Minister: Goebbels and the Cinema in the Third Reich. Stuttgart: Axel Menges. ISBN 978-3-932565-10-6.
