= Jürgen von Alten =

German actor, screenwriter and film director

- Born: 12 January 1903; Hannover, German Empire
- Died: 28 February 1994 (aged 91); Bremen, Germany
- Occupations: Actor; Screenwriter; Director
- Years active: 1931–1990

Jürgen von Alten (12 January 1903 – 28 February 1994) was a German actor, screenwriter and film director. During his career he directed around seventy short and feature films. In 1939 he made the military comedy-drama Shoulder Arms.

== Selected filmography ==
=== Director ===
- Stronger Than Regulations (1936)
- Susanne in the Bath (1936)
- Togger (1937)
- The Beaver Coat (1937)
- Secret Mission (1938)
- Shoulder Arms (1939)
- Six Days of Leave (1941)
- The Mistress of Solderhof (1959)

=== Actor ===
- Yorck (1931)
- The Poacher (1953)
- Oh! This Bavaria! (1960)
- The Death of the White Stallion (1985)

== Bibliography ==
- Richards, Jeffrey. Visions of Yesterday. Routledge & Kegan Paul, 1973.
