= Paul and Pauline =

1936 film

- Directed by: Heinz Paul
- Written by: Hanns H. Fischer; Wilhelm Stöppler; Alf Teichs
- Starring: Ludwig Manfred Lommel; Trude Hesterberg; Erika Helmke
- Cinematography: Emil Schünemann
- Music by: Paul Lincke
- Production company: Paul-Filmproduktion
- Distributed by: Terra Film
- Release date: 13 March 1936
- Running time: 92 minutes
- Country: Germany
- Language: German

Paul and Pauline (German: Paul und Pauline) is a 1936 German comedy film directed by Heinz Paul and starring Ludwig Manfred Lommel, Trude Hesterberg and Erika Helmke. It was shot at the Terra Studios in Marienfelde in Berlin.

== Synopsis ==
Paul Neugebauer has a scheme to transform his small town into a famous spa resort. To do so he plans to make a radio broadcast in order to boost the scheme, but a series of confusions unfold.

== Cast ==
- Ludwig Manfred Lommel as Paul Neugebauer
- Trude Hesterberg as Bertha Wohlleben
- Erika Helmke as Karoline - ihre Tochter
- Kurt Vespermann as Heinrich Zehnpfennig, Friseur
- Hubert von Meyerinck as Apotheker Knullingen
- Paul Westermeier as Warenhausbesitzer Großkopf
- Paul Henckels as Bürgermeister Kleinmichel
- Werner Stock as Gustav - sein Sohn
- Walter Steinbeck as Bellermann - ein Spekulant
- Ernst Behmer as Hermann - Faktotum
- Leo Peukert
- Erich Kestin
- Erich Fiedler
- Gaston Briese
- Carl Walther Meyer
- Karl Platen
- Gerhard Dammann
- Willy Kaiser-Heyl
- Walter von Allwoerden
- Max Wilmsen
- Hans Sternberg
- Herbert Quandt
- Curt Bullerjahn
- Ethel Reschke
- Ulla Ronge

== Bibliography ==
- Bock, Hans-Michael & Bergfelder, Tim. The Concise CineGraph. Encyclopedia of German Cinema. Berghahn Books, 2009.
- Klaus, Ulrich J. Deutsche Tonfilme: Jahrgang 1936. Klaus-Archiv, 1988.
