= Hilde and the Volkswagen =

1936 film

- Directed by: Heinz Paul
- Written by: Hanns H. Fischer; Kurt Sellnick
- Starring: Ludwig Manfred Lommel; Grethe Weiser; Hilde Schneider
- Cinematography: Erich Claunigk; Hugo von Kaweczynski
- Music by: Ralph Maria Siegel
- Production company: Paul-Filmproduktion
- Distributed by: Terra Film
- Release date: 16 October 1936
- Country: West Germany
- Language: German

Hilde and the Volkswagen (German: Hilde und die vier PS) is a 1936 German comedy film directed by Heinz Paul and starring Ludwig Manfred Lommel, Grethe Weiser and Hilde Schneider. It was shot at the Terra Studios in Berlin.

== Cast ==
- Ludwig Manfred Lommel as Buchhalter Lohbusch
- Grethe Weiser as Nelly Hopp
- Hilde Schneider as Hilde Lenz
- Frank Zimmermann
- Friedl Haerlin as Hella Lenius
- Walter Steinbeck as Direktor Scheffel
- Werner Stock as Nellys Bruder
- Gerhard Dammann as Aktuar Kramer
- Ethel Reschke as Hildes Freundin
- Carl Auen as Amtsgerichtsrat
- Gaston Briese as Chauffeur

== Bibliography ==
- Grange, William (2006). Hitler Laughing: Comedy in the Third Reich. University Press of America. ISBN 978-0-7618-3381-9.
- Klaus, Ulrich J. Deutsche Tonfilme: Jahrgang 1936. Klaus-Archiv, 1988.
