= Manja Behrens =

German actress (1914–2003)

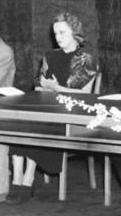
- Born: 12 April 1914; Dresden, German Empire
- Died: 18 January 2003 (aged 88); Berlin, Germany
- Occupation: Actress
- Years active: 1936–1992 (film & TV)

Manja Behrens (12 April 1914 – 18 January 2003) was a German stage, film and television actress. She is best remembered as the mistress of Reichsleiter Martin Bormann during World War II.

The actress moved to the Maxim Gorki Theater in 1967, where she was on stage for almost 25 years until reunification. Despite the ban on filming, which lasted until around 1980, she appeared sporadically in small film roles in Deutscher Fernsehfunk television productions. Since 1980, larger film roles followed in both East German and West German television films. Along the way, she also took guest roles at the Burgtheater in Vienna, the Staatstheater in Bern and the Stadttheater in Ingolstadt. "She is one of the actresses who are essential to German theater," wrote Der Tagesspiegel on the occasion of her 85th birthday. After the fall of the Berlin Wall, she devoted herself to theater appearances as well as lecture tours, among other things.

== Selected filmography ==
- Stronger Than Regulations (1936)
- Susanne in the Bath (1936)
- Gejagt bis zum Morgen (1957)
- Ehesache Lorenz (1959)
- Seilergasse 8 (1960)
- The Fair (1960)

== Bibliography ==
- Waldman, Harry. Nazi Films in America, 1933–1942. McFarland, 2008.
