= Erika Helmke =

German actress (1908–2002)

- Born: 15 April 1908; Berlin, German Empire
- Died: 26 November 2002 (aged 94); Ottawa, Ontario, Canada
- Occupations: Actress, singer
- Years active: 1931–1948 (film)

Erika Helmke (4 April 1908 – 26 November 2002) was a German stage and film actress. She married the Canadian artist Herbert Dassel and emigrated to Canada.

== Selected filmography ==
- The Spanish Fly (1931)
- I Do Not Want to Know Who You Are (1932)
- The Lake Calls (1933)
- Paul and Pauline (1936)
- The Night With the Emperor (1936)
- Dangerous Game (1937)
- Liberated Hands (1939)
- The Gasman (1941)
- Clarissa (1941)
- Everything for Gloria (1941)

== Bibliography ==
- Hinton, Stephen. Kurt Weill: The Threepenny Opera. CUP Archive, 1990.
