= Maria the Maid =

1936 film

- Hans Schlenck, Hilde Körber and Ernst Legal
- Directed by: Veit Harlan
- Written by: Axel Eggebrecht; Veit Harlan
- Based on: Die Kindsmagd (novella) by Walter Harlan
- Starring: Hilde Körber; Hilde Hildebrand; Alfred Abel
- Cinematography: Werner Bohne
- Edited by: Walter von Bonhorst
- Music by: Leo Leux
- Production company: Minerva Tonfilm
- Distributed by: Rota Film
- Release date: 2 October 1936
- Running time: 88 minutes
- Country: Germany
- Language: German

Maria the Maid (German: Maria, die Magd) is a 1936 German drama film directed by Veit Harlan and starring Hilde Körber, Hilde Hildebrand, and Alfred Abel. It is based on Die Kindsmagd, a novella by Walter Harlan (the director's father). It was shot at the Johannisthal Studios in Berlin. The film's sets were designed by the art directors Erich Grave and Hans Minzloff.

== Cast ==
- Hilde Körber as Maria Klimank
- Hilde Hildebrand as Actress Alice Winter
- Alfred Abel as Lawyer Dr. Winter
- Hans Schlenck as Soldier Franz
- Herbert Paulmüller as Franz's father
- Ernst Legal as Mayor Kilmank
- Helmut Brasch as Johann
- Will Dohm as Albert
- Wolfgang Kieling as Christoph, Marias little brother
- Arthur Fritz Eugens as Gerd
- Manny Ziener as Mother Klimank
- Gerhardt Gruender as Eugen
- Gisela von Collande as Eugens Governess
- Erika Raphael as Kathi, maidservant
- Erich Kestin as Reporter
- Else Petersen as Alice's friend
- Carl Auen as Theatre Director
- Rudolf Essek as Dr. Berghof
- Walter Albrecht as Friend at bowling
- Doddy Delissen as Singer
- Walter Schramm-Duncker as Farmer
- Juliana Sommer as Farmer's wife
- Fritz Ulrich as Guest at silver wedding
- Walter Werner as Old man in the train

== Bibliography ==
- Bock, Hans-Michael; Bergfelder, Tim, eds. (2009). The Concise Cinegraph: Encyclopaedia of German Cinema. New York: Berghahn Books. ISBN 978-1-57181-655-9.
