= Youth of the World =

Film of the 1936 Winter Olympics

- German: Jugend der Welt. Der Film von den IV. Olympischen Winterspielen in Garmisch-Partenkirchen
- Directed by: Carl Junghans
- Release date: 1935
- Running time: 37 minutes
- Country: Germany
- Language: German

Youth of the World (German: Jugend der Welt. Der Film von den IV. Olympischen Winterspielen in Garmisch-Partenkirchen) is a 1935 German film directed by Carl Junghans. It was the official film of the 1936 Winter Olympics.

== Production ==
The film was directed by Carl Junghans, a documentary filmmaker.

== Release ==
UFA gave the Museum of Modern Art a copy of the film in fall 1936. Metro-Goldwyn-Mayer was meant to distribute the film in the United States and premiere it at the Capital Theatre in New York City, but pulled the film after protests by the Non-Sectarian Anti-Nazi League.

== See also ==
- Olympia (1938 film)

== Works cited ==
- Waldman, Harry (2008). Nazi Films In America, 1933-1942. McFarland & Company. ISBN 9780786438617.
