= Hermann Ungar =

Czechoslovak writer and diplomat (1893–1929)

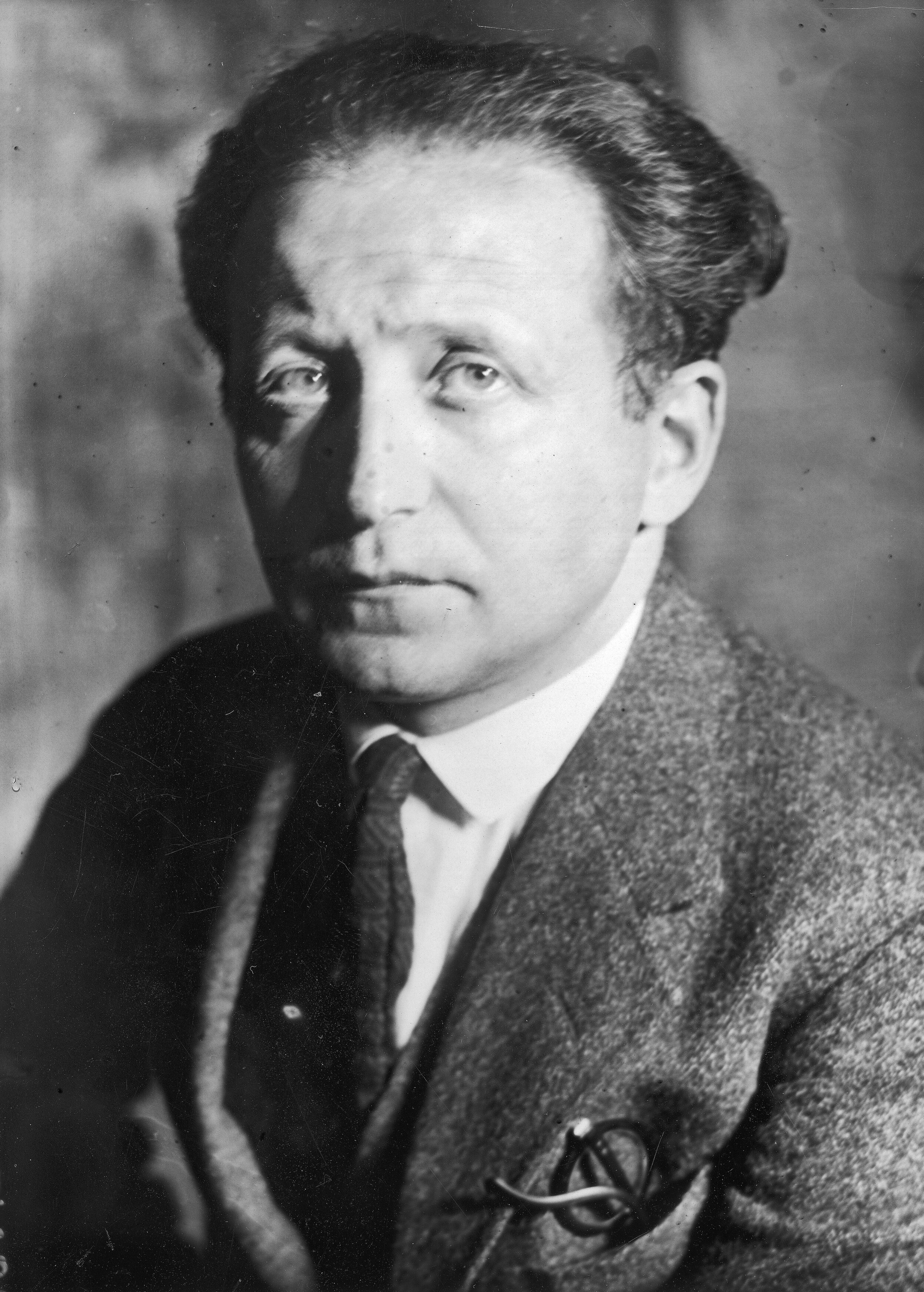
Hermann Ungar (before 1929)

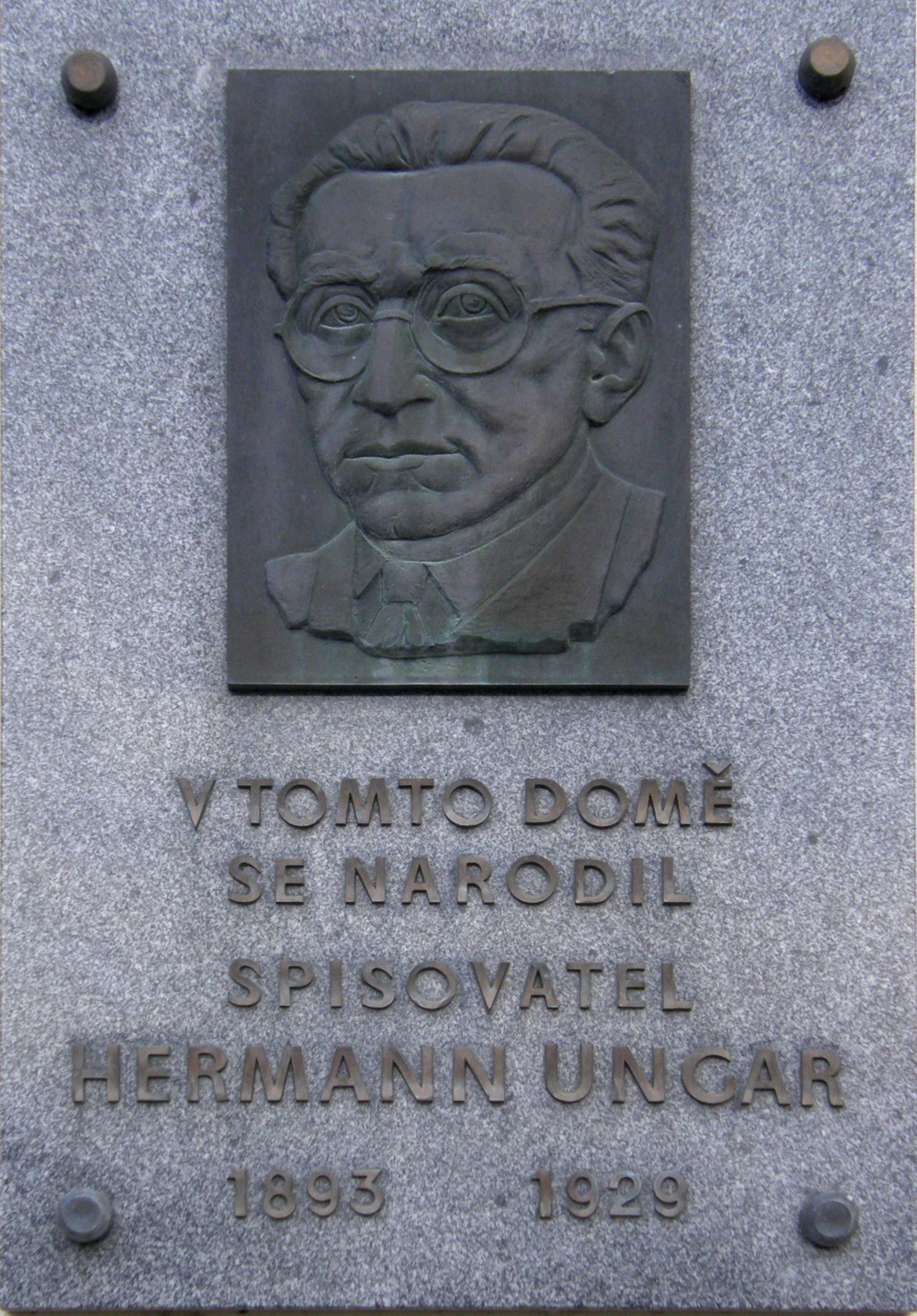
Memorial plaque on his birth house in Boskovice

Hermann Ungar (April 20, 1893 in Boskovice – October 28, 1929 in Prague) was a Czech-Jewish writer (in the German language) and an officer in Czechoslovakia's Ministry of Foreign Affairs.

== Biography ==
Ungar's father, Emil, was a cider maker who served as Mayor of Boskovice. After graduating from the public schools in Brno, Hermann Ungar went to Berlin, where he took courses in Oriental Studies until 1911, followed by legal and philosophical studies in Munich and Prague. After service in World War I, where he sustained serious injuries on the Galician Front, he passed the state examination and received his degree in 1918.

At first, he worked as a lawyer and director of the theater in Cheb, where he also wrote plays. In 1922, he became the Legationsrat (Legation Counselor) at the new Czechoslovak embassy in Berlin. In the same year he married Margarete Weiss (born Stransky). Later he returned to Prague and became the Ministerial Commissioner at the Foreign Affairs ministry. While there, he began to associate with a literary circle that included Franz Kafka, Max Brod and Ernst Weiß.

His writing was becoming successful, so he quit the diplomatic service in 1929, but died not long after, aged only 36, during an appendectomy that had been postponed for too long.

His wife and two sons fled to the UK in 1939. His brother and parents were murdered in Auschwitz in 1942, but his sister was able to escape and went to Tel Aviv.

His play Der rote General was a great success in Berlin in 1928. His second play Die Gartenlaube was also a great success but was not performed in Berlin until shortly after his death. These plays have been printed and extensively reviewed. His novels were influenced by expressionism and psychoanalysis and were praised by Thomas Mann, who became a godfather to Ungar's son, Tom (born Thomas Michael Ungar). According to a 2012 obituary of Tom (who had changed his name to Unwin), his father "wrote about sex and psychosis in a manner that shocked the establishment".

== Works ==
- Boys and Murderers (1920, novel)
- The Maimed (1923, novel)
- The Murder of Captain Hanika (1925, non-fiction)
- The Class (1927, novel)
- The Red General (1928, play)
- The Arbor (1930, play)
- Colbert's Journey (1930, short stories)

Hermann Ungar, Das Gesamtwerk, Verlag Paul Zsolnay, Wien-Darmstadt, 1989, 461pp. Dieter Sudhoff, Hermann Ungar Leben-Werk-Wirkung Verlag Königshausen und Neumann Wurzburg, 1990, 700pp.
