= Ludwig Manfred Lommel =

- Born: 10 January 1891; Jauer, Lower Silesia, German Empire
- Died: 19 September 1962 (aged 71); Bad Nauheim, Hesse, West Germany
- Occupation: Actor
- Years active: 1931-1956 (film)

Ludwig Manfred Lommel (1891–1962) was a German stage and film actor. He was the father of the actress Ruth Lommel and actor Ulli Lommel. His youngest son, Manuel Lommel, is a cinematographer.

== Selected filmography ==
- Paul and Pauline (1936)
- Hilde and the Volkswagen (1936)
- Die Christel von der Post (1956)

== Bibliography ==
- Hull, David Stewart. Film in the Third Reich: a study of the German cinema, 1933-1945. University of California Press, 1969.
