= MS Franziska =

- Written by: Heinz Oskar Wuttig
- Directed by: Wolfgang Staudte
- Starring: Paul Dahlke
- Country of origin: Germany

MS Franziska is a German television series.

== See also ==
- List of German television series
