= Julia Dahmen =

German television actress

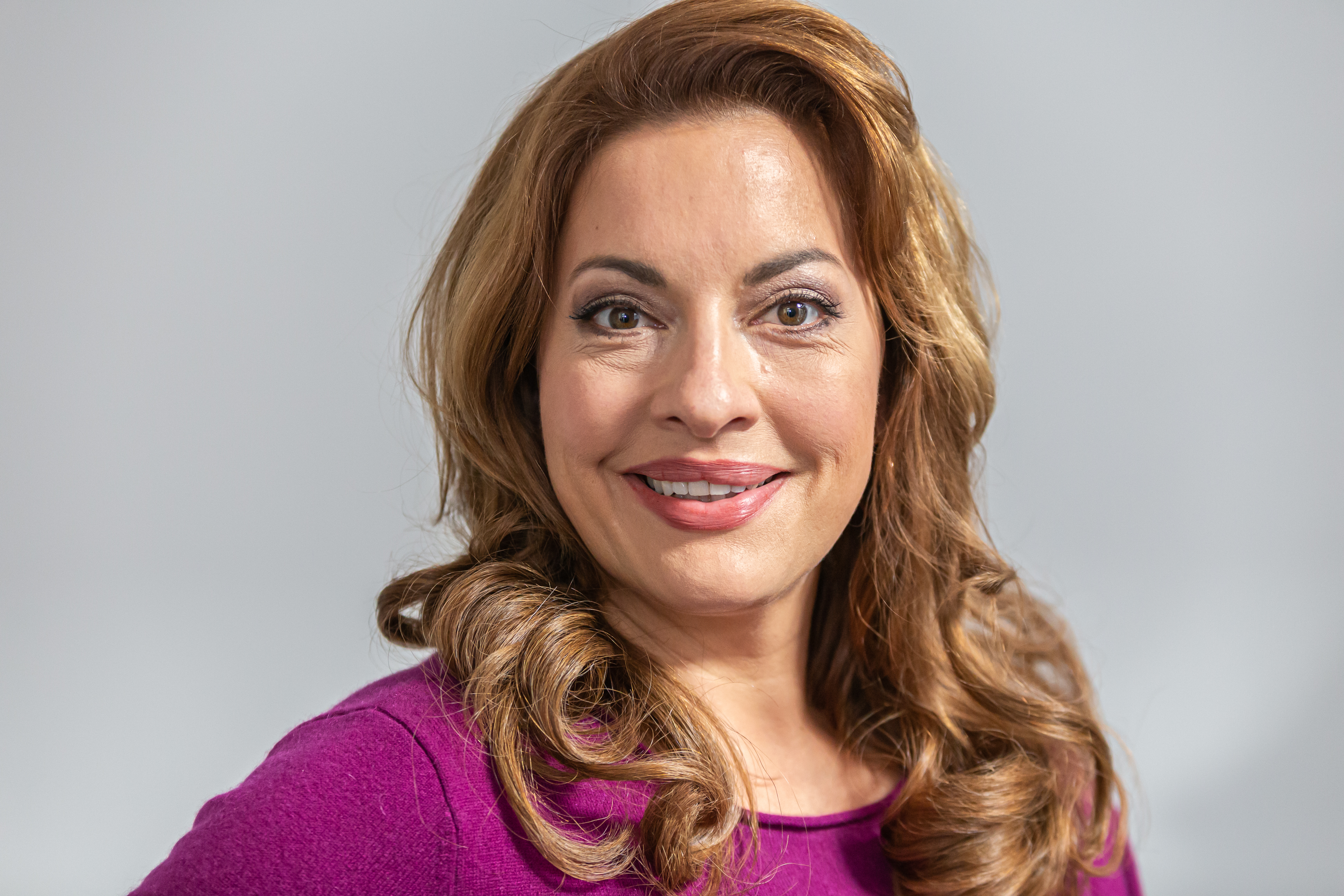
- Born: Julia Dahmen; 2 April 1978 (age 46); Hamburg, West Germany
- Website: http://www.julia-dahmen.de/

Julia Dahmen (born 2 April 1978) is a German television actress. She is most noted for her role as Constanze Riemer in the soap opera Marienhof, and her role as Leonora Lopez in Storm of Love.

She is the daughter of the actors Karlheinz Lemken and Andrea Dahmen.
