= Walter Werner =

German actor

- Born: Walter Gotthard Werner; 11 April 1883; Görlitz, German Empire
- Died: January 8, 1956 (aged 72); East Berlin, East Germany
- Occupation: Actor
- Years active: 1921–1956

Walter Gotthard Werner (11 April 1883 – 8 January 1956) was a German actor. He appeared in more than seventy films from 1921 to 1956.

== Selected filmography ==
| Year | Title | Role |
|---|---|---|
| 1949 | Don't Dream, Annette | Concert Room Spectator |
| 1948 | 1-2-3 Corona | Doctor Waldner |
| 1948 | Street Acquaintances | Redakteur |
| 1947 | Marriage in the Shadows | Mr. Hofbauer |
| 1945 | Via Mala | Dorfarzt |
| 1944 | Die Feuerzangenbowle | Pfeiffers House Servant |
| 1942 | Destiny | Dragan |
| 1941 | Friedemann Bach | Theater Troupe Director |
| 1941 | Ohm Krüger | Parliamentary Member Kock |
| 1941 | Riding for Germany | Privy Councillor |
| 1941 | My Life For Ireland | Minister |
| 1940 | Jud Süss | Mr. Fiebelkorn |
| 1940 | Bismarck | 1st President of the Landtag |
| 1940 | Friedrich Schiller - Triumph of a Genius | Stage Actor Playing 'Daniel' |
| 1939 | Robert Koch | Bailiff Stübecke |
| 1939 | We Danced Around the World | Waldemar |
| 1938 | Triad | Dr. Sitthard, Arzt |
| 1938 | Dance on the Volcano | Debureaus Freund Maurac |
| 1938 | The Deruga Case | Dr. Gürtner |
| 1938 | Shadows Over St. Pauli | Uncle Timmer |
| 1938 | You and I | Helling |
| 1938 | The Great and the Little Love | Erikas's Father |
| 1937 | The Man Who Was Sherlock Holmes | Dr. Balderin |
| 1937 | The Beaver Coat | Head Official |
| 1937 | The Kreutzer Sonata | Dr. Raskin |
| 1937 | The Broken Jug | Servant |
| 1937 | Togger | Father Andreas |
| 1937 | An Enemy of the People | Doctor Kettler |
| 1936 | Maria the Maid | Old Man in the Train |
| 1936 | The Dreamer | Medical Consultant Brunner |
| 1933 | The Lake Calls | |
| 1931 | Danton | Malsherbes |
| 1931 | Berlin-Alexanderplatz | |
| 1925 | The Found Bride | Wirt |
| 1925 | A Free People | Prosecutor Karg |
| 1924 | Husbands or Lovers | |
| 1923 | I.N.R.I. | Lebdäus |
