= Hard Luck Mary =

1934 film

- Directed by: Erich Engel
- Written by: Erich Engel; Henry Koster; Eva Leidmann
- Produced by: Eberhard Klagemann
- Starring: Jenny Jugo; Friedrich Benfer; Willi Schur
- Cinematography: Willy Winterstein
- Edited by: Hilde Grebner
- Music by: Theo Mackeben
- Production company: Klagemann-Film
- Distributed by: Fox Film
- Release date: 12 September 1934
- Running time: 92 minutes
- Country: Nazi Germany
- Language: German

Hard Luck Mary (German: Pechmarie) is a 1934 German comedy film directed by Erich Engel and starring Jenny Jugo, Friedrich Benfer, and Willi Schur. The film's sets were designed by the art director Emil Hasler and Arthur Schwarz. It was released in the United States in 1935 by Fox Film.

== Synopsis ==
Marie, after a run of bad luck, is living in a room in a Berlin slum. Her house painter boyfriend Peter becomes jealous of her dalliance with another man. Marie's luck finally turns when she wins the lottery and reconciles with Peter.

== Cast ==
- Jenny Jugo as Marie
- Friedrich Benfer as Peter
- Willi Schur as Bonse
- Mally Georgi as Lilli
- Ernst G. Schiffner as Brauer
- Gerhard Bienert as Kagel
- Karl Hannemann as Der Portier
- Hans von Zedlitz as Ein Afrikaforscher
- Hans Kettler as Ein Bursche
- Artur Malkowsky as Ein Polizist
- Wolfgang Staudte
- Josef Reithofer as Ein Kellner
- Louis Brody as Ein Neger
- Horst Birr
- Dolly Raphael
- Hans Meyer-Hanno
- Arthur Reinhardt
- Eva Schmid-Kayser
- Reinhold Gerstenberg
- Max Haß-Eckardt
- Fred Immler
- Gustav Lindström
- Theodor Thony

== Bibliography ==
- Waldman, Harry (2008). Nazi Films in America, 1933–1942. Jefferson, NC: McFarland. ISBN 978-0-7864-3861-7.
