= The Flight from Love =

1929 film

- German: Die Flucht vor der Liebe
- Directed by: Hans Behrendt
- Written by: Victor Abel
- Produced by: Alfred Zeisler
- Starring: Friedrich Benfer; Paul Otto; Kurt Vespermann
- Cinematography: Franz Planer
- Production company: UFA
- Distributed by: UFA
- Release date: 16 September 1929
- Country: Germany
- Languages: Silent; German intertitles

The Flight from Love (German: Die Flucht vor der Liebe) is a 1929 German silent film directed by Hans Behrendt and starring Friedrich Benfer, Paul Otto and Kurt Vespermann. It was shot at the Babelsberg Studios in Berlin and on location in Austria. The film's art direction was by Willi Herrmann.

== Cast ==
- Friedrich Benfer as Mario von Hollberg
- Paul Otto as Franz von Hollberg, Vater
- Kurt Vespermann as Henry von Nostitz, Attaché
- Vera Schmiterlöw as Thea, seine Schwester
- Kurt Gerron as Max Ruppke
- Jenny Jugo as Marga, seine Tochter
- Paul Heidemann as Gustav Beibernitz
- Kurt Willuschat as Emil, Artistenlehrling
- Hermann Stetza as Schlangenmensch Huddeldinuddel
