= Erich Engel =

German director

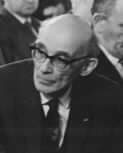
Erich Engel in 1962

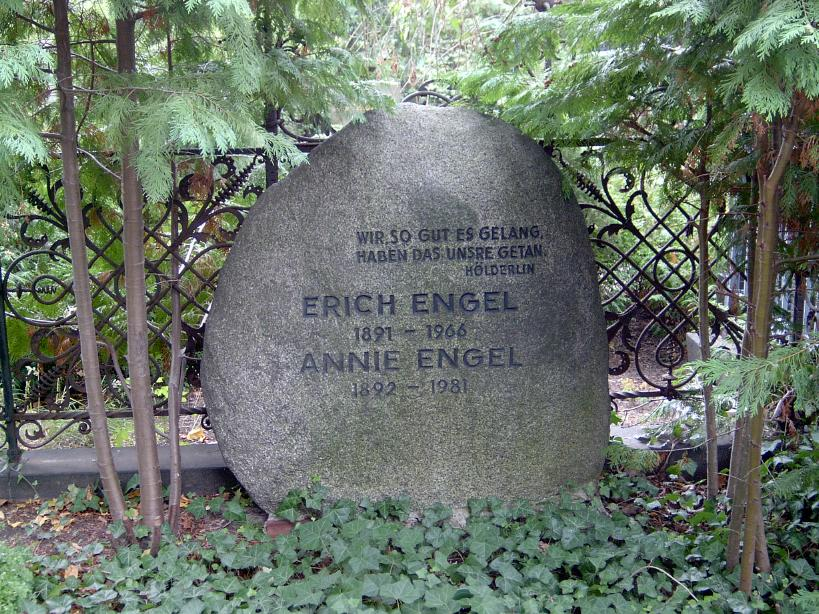
Grave of Erich Engel in the Dorotheenstadt burial ground in Berlin

Erich Gustav Otto Engel (14 February 1891 – 10 May 1966) was a German film and theatre director. (Note: He is often confused with another German film director called Erich Engels (with an s), who specialised in comedy, and crime films.)

== Biography ==
Engel was born in Hamburg, where later he studied at the School of Applied Arts. After finishing there he worked briefly as a journalist, then learnt acting at the Thalia Theatre in Hamburg, after which he spent several years with a touring theatre company.

In 1917 and 1918 Engel was the dramaturgist in the Deutsches Schauspielhaus, and later in the Hamburger Kammerspiele. After a short engagement with the Bayerische Staatstheater in Munich he moved in 1924 to Berlin. At the Deutsche Theater he produced, among other pieces, Bertolt Brecht's Im Dickicht der Städte and soon became one of the foremost interpreters of Brecht's works on the German stage.

His breakthrough came with Brecht's Dreigroschenoper, the premiere of which he produced, opening on 31 August 1928 in the Theater am Schiffbauerdamm, Berlin.

In 1930 Engel also began directing films, but in order to avoid being commissioned to make propaganda films for the National Socialists he concentrated on comedies, characterised by their irony and wit. Among the principal actors in his early films were Jenny Jugo in Fünf von der Jazzband (1932), Gustav Waldau in Unser Fräulein Doktor (1940) and Otto Gebühr in Viel Lärm um Nixi (1942). In this period he worked closely with Theo Mackeben as composer and musical director. He was also engaged as theatrical director at the Berliner Deutsche Theater.

In Vienna in 1935 he produced the film ... nur ein Komödiant, with Rudolf Forster in a double role. Set in the 18th century, this film was opposed to militarism and authoritarianism, as is recognisable inter alia in the scene when a military officer refuses an order to fire indiscriminately on a crowd of rebellious peasants. Probably because of the film's period setting, which seems to have veiled its political stance, it was passed by both the Austrian and the German censors.

During the National Socialist period Engel made numerous films for UFA. After World War II he became the director of the Münchner Kammerspiele, but from 1949 lived and worked in the DDR. Among other pieces he directed for DEFA in 1948 the film Affäre Blum and in 1951 Kommen Sie am Ersten with Inge Meysel.

Later films that he made for DEFA included Geschwader Fledermaus (1958), in which he opposed the French colonial war in Vietnam. For his many DEFA productions he received the Nationalpreis der DDR. However, he also directed in West Germany for Artur Brauner.

As senior director in Brecht's Berliner Ensemble Engel returned to the Theater am Schiffbauerdamm, where after the death of Brecht he directed the premiere in 1957 of the Leben des Galilei with the choreographer Jean Soubeyran.

He died in Berlin in 1966 and is buried in the Dorotheenstadt burial ground near the graves of Bertolt Brecht and Heinrich Mann.

== Thomas Engel ==
His son Thomas Engel (1922-2015) was also a director (for among others the ARD, for whom he produced the television series Tatort) and screenplay writer. Father and son co-directed the film Annaluise and Anton (1953).

== Selected filmography ==
- Mysterien eines Frisiersalons (1923), co-director with Bert Brecht (with Karl Valentin, Blandine Ebinger, Carola Neher, and Max Schreck)
- Love Is the Power of Women (1924) (with Fern Andra)
- Who Takes Love Seriously? (1931) (with Jenny Jugo and Max Hansen)
- Five from the Jazz Band (1932) (with Jenny Jugo)
- Inge and the Millions (1933) (with Brigitte Helm and Paul Wegener)
- Hard Luck Mary (1934) (with Jenny Jugo)
- The Secret of Cavelli (Austria, 1934) (with Rudolf Forster and Hans Moser)
- ... nur ein Komödiant (Austria, 1935) (with Rudolf Forster, Christl Mardayn, Hilde von Stolz, Paul Wegener)
- Pygmalion (1935) (with Jenny Jugo, Gustaf Gründgens, and Käthe Haack)
- The Night With the Emperor (1936) (with Jenny Jugo and Paul Henckels)
- A Wedding Dream (1936) (with Ida Wüst, Theo Lingen, Ferdinand Marian)
- Victoria in Dover (1936) (with Jenny Jugo, Paul Henckels, and Erik Ode)
- Dangerous Game (1937)
- The Muzzle (1938) (with Elisabeth Flickenschildt, Paul Henckels, and Will Quadflieg based on the novel by Heinrich Spoerl)
- A Hopeless Case (1938) (with Jenny Jugo, Karl Ludwig Diehl, Axel von Ambesser
- Hotel Sacher (1939) (with Willy Birgel and Wolf Albach-Retty)
- Our Miss Doctor (1940)
- Nanette (1940) (with Jenny Jugo and Hans Söhnker)
- Much Ado About Nixi (1942)
- Sommerliebe (1942) (with O. W. Fischer)
- Don't Talk to Me About Love (1943)
- An Old Heart Becomes Young Again (1943) (with Emil Jannings and Viktor de Kowa)
- Es lebe die Liebe (1944) (with Lizzi Waldmüller and Johannes Heesters)
- Wo ist Herr Belling (1945) (with Emil Jannings)
- Journey to Happiness (1948) (with Käthe Dorsch, Rudolf Forster, and Hildegard Knef)
- Blum Affair (East Germany, 1948) (with Hans Christian Blech, Paul Bildt, and Gisela Trowe)
- The Beaver Coat (East Germany, 1949) (with Fita Benkhoff, Werner Hinz, and Käthe Haack, based on an original work by Gerhart Hauptmann)
- Das seltsame Leben des Herrn Bruggs (West Germany, 1951) (with Gustav Knuth)
- Under the Thousand Lanterns (West Germany, 1952) (with Inge Meysel, René Deltgen, and Gisela Trowe)
- The Merry Vineyard (West Germany, 1952) (with Gustav Knuth, Camilla Spira, and Willy Reichert based on an original work by Carl Zuckmayer)
- Consul Strotthoff (West Germany, 1954)
- Du bist die Richtige (West Germany, 1955)
- Before God and Man (West Germany, 1955)
- Love Without Illusions (West Germany, 1955) (with Sonja Ziemann and Curd Jürgens)
- Geschwader Fledermaus (East Germany, 1958)
