= Victoria in Dover =

Victoria in Dover may refer to:

- Victoria in Dover (1936 film), a German film directed by Erich Engel
- Victoria in Dover (1954 film), an Austrian film directed by Ernst Marischka
