= A Hopeless Case =

1939 film

- Directed by: Erich Engel
- Written by: Jochen Huth
- Produced by: Eberhard Klagemann
- Starring: Jenny Jugo; Karl Ludwig Diehl; Hannes Stelzer
- Cinematography: Fritz Arno Wagner
- Edited by: Carl Otto Bartning
- Music by: Hans-Otto Borgmann
- Production company: Klagemann-Film
- Release date: 7 March 1939
- Country: Germany
- Language: German

A Hopeless Case (German: Ein hoffnungsloser Fall) is a 1939 German comedy film directed by Erich Engel and starring Jenny Jugo, Karl Ludwig Diehl and Hannes Stelzer.

The film's sets were designed by Karl Weber.

== Synopsis ==
A determined female medical student at Berlin University resists the advances of her professor, single-mindedly concentrating on her chosen profession. She then sails to Argentina with her true love, a fellow student who the Professor has arranged to be sent there to try and get him out of the way.

== Cast ==
- Jenny Jugo as Jenny
- Karl Ludwig Diehl as Professor Dr. Bruchsal
- Hannes Stelzer as Hans Faber
- Leo Peukert as Jennys Vater
- Axel von Ambesser as Verehrer
- Heinz Salfner as Diener
- Theodor Danegger as Gotthelf Matthias
- Josefine Dora as Emma Matthias
- Hans Richter as Student
- Erik Ode as Student
- Julia Serda
- Frida Richard
- Gustav Waldau
- Werner Pledath

== Trivia ==
On 14 March 1939, Adolf Hitler summoned Emil Hácha, President of Czechoslovakia to Berlin for talks. The meeting was scheduled late at night and was to include, apart from Hitler, Hermann Göring and Joachim von Ribbentrop. The elderly Hácha was humiliated by being deliberately kept waiting for hours, because Hitler was at that time watching the film A Hopeless Case, which ended past midnight. He was summoned by Hitler at 1:15 AM, who informed him that German troops would march into Czechoslovakia at 6:00 AM, on the pretext that the Czechs were disturbing the peace in Europe. In the antechamber, Göring and Ribbentrop pressed Hácha to sign a document legalizing the invasion. When Hácha hesitated, Göring threatened to bomb Prague, whereupon Hácha fainted. Revived by injection, Hácha signed a document in the presence of Hitler accepting the invasion and annexation of Czech lands into the Third Reich, which began in the early morning of 15 March 1939.

== Bibliography ==
- Waldman, Harry (2008). Nazi Films in America, 1933–1942. McFarland. ISBN 978-0-7864-3861-7.
