= Docks of Hamburg =

1928 film

- Directed by: Erich Waschneck
- Written by: Bobby E. Lüthge; Erich Waschneck
- Produced by: Alfred Zeisler
- Starring: Jenny Jugo; Willy Fritsch; Fritz Rasp; Wolfgang Zilzer
- Cinematography: Friedl Behn-Grund
- Production company: UFA
- Distributed by: UFA
- Release date: 10 October 1928
- Running time: 114 minutes
- Country: Germany
- Languages: Silent; German intertitles

Docks of Hamburg or The Carmen of St. Pauli (German: Die Carmen von St. Pauli) is a 1928 German silent drama film directed by Erich Waschneck and starring Jenny Jugo, Willy Fritsch, and Fritz Rasp. It was made by UFA at their Babelsberg Studio with location shooting in Hamburg. Art direction was by Alfred Junge. The film was released in the United States in 1930.

== Premise ==
A merchant sailor catches a thief at the port, who turns out to be attractive young woman. She works in a St. Pauli beer hall and is not averse to smuggling. He becomes involved with her, and gets sucked into a life of crime.

== Cast ==
- Jenny Jugo as Jenny Hummel
- Willy Fritsch as Klaus Brandt
- Fritz Rasp as The doctor
- Wolfgang Zilzer as The nipper
- Tonio Gennaro as Gentle Heinrich
- Otto Kronburger as Karl the pilot
- Walter Seiler as Randy Alfred
- Charly Berger as The captain
- Fritz Alberti as Shipowner Rasmussen
- Max Maximilian as Rasmussen's old servant
- Betty Astor as Klaus fiancee
- Friedrich Benfer as Racing cyclist
- Alfred Zeisler

== Bibliography ==
- Bock, Hans-Michael; Töteberg, Michael, eds. (1994) [1992]. Das Ufa-Buch: Kunst und Krisen, Stars und Regisseure, Wirtschaft und Politik (in German). Frankfurt: Zweitausendeins. ISBN 978-3-86150-065-0.
