= Anton Pointner =

Austrian actor

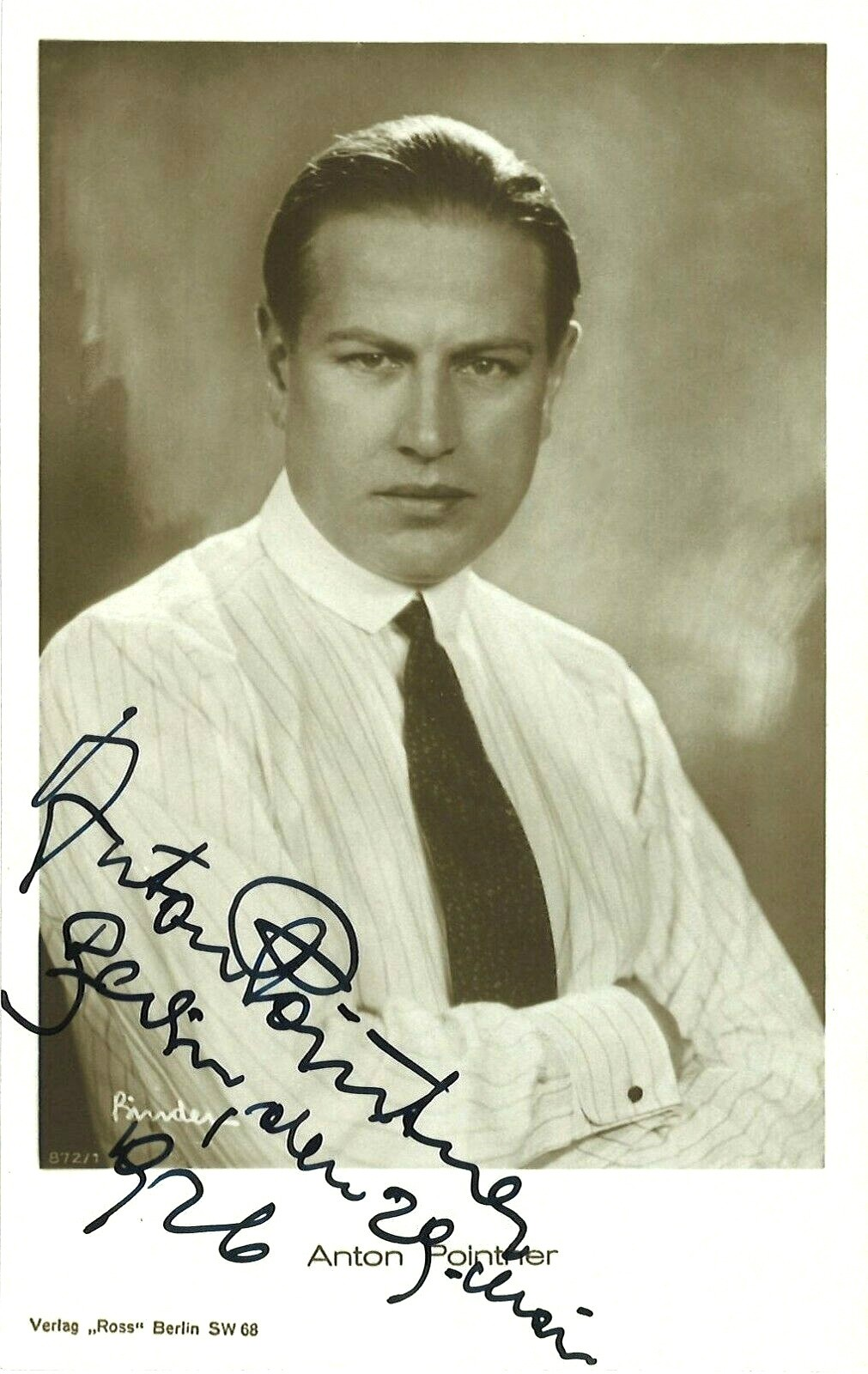
- Pointner in 1926
- Born: 8 December 1894; Salzburg, Austria-Hungary
- Died: 8 September 1949 (aged 54); Hintersee, Austria
- Occupation: Actor
- Years active: 1907–1949

Anton Pointner (8 December 1894 in Salzburg – 8 September 1949 in Hintersee) was an Austrian stage and film actor. Pointner's career began on the stages of Austria and he performed in both silent and sound films in his native Austria, as well as in Germany and the United States.

== Selected filmography ==
- Martyr of His Heart (1918)
- Lady Hamilton (1921)
- The Love Affairs of Hector Dalmore (1921)
- The Adventuress of Monte Carlo (1921)
- Frauenmoral (1923)
- The Second Shot (1923)
- Earth Spirit (1923)
- The Curse (1924)
- The Sailor Perugino (1924)
- Nelly, the Bride Without a Husband (1924)
- Marionettes of the Princess (1924)
- Flight Around the World (1925)
- Old Mamsell's Secret (1925)
- The Dealer from Amsterdam (1925)
- A Free People (1925)
- Circus Romanelli (1926)
- When I Came Back (1926)
- The Bank Crash of Unter den Linden (1926)
- The Third Squadron (1926)
- The Three Mannequins (1926)
- The White Horse Inn (1926)
- Heads Up, Charley (1927)
- The Impostor (1927)
- The Sporck Battalion (1927)
- Radio Magic (1927)
- The Standard-Bearer of Sedan (1927)
- Rasputin (1928)
- Five Anxious Days (1928)
- Charlotte Somewhat Crazy (1928)
- Sixteen Daughters and No Father (1928)
- From a Bachelor's Diary (1928)
- Love in the Cowshed (1928)
- The Carousel of Death (1928)
- The Story of a Little Parisian (1928)
- The Merry Widower (1929)
- Secret Police (1929)
- The Youths (1929)
- The Hero of Every Girl's Dream (1929)
- The Burning Heart (1929)
- Father and Son (1929)
- The Dance Goes On (1930)
- The Woman Without Nerves (1930)
- The Theft of the Mona Lisa (1931)
- Kismet (1931)
- Men Behind Bars (1931)
- The Mask Falls (1931)
- The Sacred Flame (1931)
- Weekend in Paradise (1931)
- The Cheeky Devil (1932)
- Viennese Waltz (1932)
- Gypsies of the Night (1932)
- Mrs. Lehmann's Daughters (1932)
- The Secret of Johann Orth (1932)
- Marshal Forwards (1932)
- Storms of Passion (1932)
- Holzapfel Knows Everything (1932)
- Trenck (1932)
- I by Day, You by Night (1932)
- Impossible Love (1932)
- The Ladies Diplomat (1932)
- Countess Mariza (1932)
- Honour Among Thieves (1933)
- Season in Cairo (1933)
- The Racokzi March (1933)
- The Tsarevich (1933)
- Jumping Into the Abyss (1933)
- The Hymn of Leuthen (1933)
- A Precocious Girl (1934)
- Miss Madame (1934)
- Spring Parade (1934)
- Peter (1934)
- The English Marriage (1934)
- Enjoy Yourselves (1934)
- Suburban Cabaret (1935)
- My Life for Maria Isabella (1935)
- The Royal Waltz (1935)
- Lumpaci the Vagabond (1936)
- Thank You, Madame (1936)
- Stjenka Rasin (1936)
- Hannerl and Her Lovers (1936)
- The Empress's Favourite (1936)
- The Love of the Maharaja (1936)
- The Violet of Potsdamer Platz (1936)
- Fridericus (1937)
- Dangerous Game (1937)
- Woman's Love—Woman's Suffering (1937)
- The Irresistible Man (1937)
- Five Million Look for an Heir (1938)
- Red Orchids (1938)
- The Girl with a Good Reputation (1938)
- Secret Mission (1938)
- Maria Ilona (1939)
- Twelve Minutes After Midnight (1939)
- Renate in the Quartet (1939)
- The Scoundrel (1939)
- Nanette (1940)
- Judgement Day (1940)
- Der Postmeister (1940)
- The Three Codonas (1940)
- My Daughter Lives in Vienna (1940)
- Beloved Augustin (1940)
- Riding for Germany (1941)
- Der große König (1942)
- His Son (1942)
- Anuschka (1942)
- To Be God One Time (1942)
- Münchhausen (1943)
- Maresi (1948)
- Who Is This That I Love? (1950)
- Regimental Music (1950)

== Bibliography ==
- Kester, Bernadette. Film Front Weimar: Representations of the First World War in German films of the Weimar Period (1919–1933). Amsterdam University Press, 2003.
