= Eberhard Klagemann =

German film producer

- Born: 20 April 1904; Wilhelmshaven, Lower Saxony; German Empire
- Died: 30 March 1990 (aged 85); Königsdorf, Bavaria; West Germany
- Occupation: Producer
- Years active: 1930–1964

Eberhard Klagemann (20 April 1904 – 30 March 1990) was a German film producer. During the 1930s, he worked for UFA as an assistant producer under Erich Pommer and later for 20th Century Fox's German subsidiary. Following the Second World War, Klagemann was issued a license to make films by Pommer, now Film Control Officer for the Allied occupiers of Germany. Pommer judged that he along with several other old colleagues had avoided becoming too closely involved with the Nazi regime: "Certainly all of them have been proven to be no Nazis. Eberhard Klagemann seems to have been cleverly able to also stay away from the Nazis. He surely is an opportunist and therefore should be handled with care. Too bad, because he knows more about our business than all the others".

Klagemann set up a Munich-based firm Klagemann Film and was an important figure in post-war German cinema. He was president of the West German Film Producers' Association. He was in a relationship with the Austrian actress Jenny Jugo. He produced several of her films, among them her final three post-war productions, including the DEFA comedy Don't Dream, Annette (1949), before she married Friedrich Benfer in 1950 and retired from acting at the age of 46.

== Selected filmography ==
- Hearts are Trumps (1934)
- Pygmalion (1935)
- The Night With the Emperor (1936)
- Victoria in Dover (1936)
- Dangerous Game (1937)
- The Great and the Little Love (1938)
- A Hopeless Case (1939)
- Nanette (1940)
- Our Miss Doctor (1940)
- Much Ado About Nixi (1942)
- Don't Dream, Annette (1949)
- Royal Children (1950)
- Heart's Desire (1951)
- Hanussen (1955)
- Jacqueline (1959)
- Condemned to Sin (1964)

== Bibliography ==
- Bock, Hans-Michael & Bergfelder, Tim. The Concise CineGraph. Encyclopedia of German Cinema. Berghahn Books, 2009.
- Hardt, Ursula. From Caligari to California: Erich Pommer's life in the International Film Wars. Berghahn Books, 1996.
- Trumpbour, John. Selling Hollywood to the World: U.S. and European Struggles for Mastery of the Global Film Industry, 1920-1950. Cambridge University Press, 2007.
