= Olga Limburg =

German actress (1881–1970)

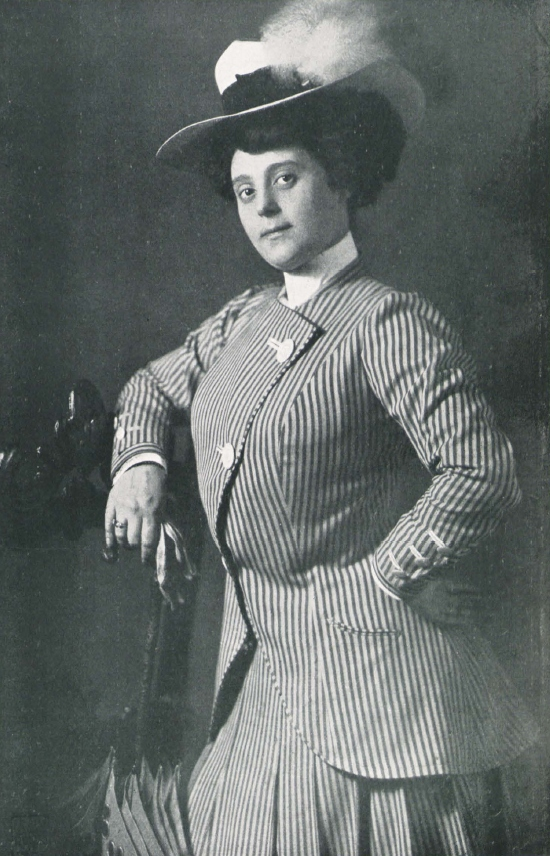
- Olga Limburg, ca. 1908
- Born: 5 April 1881; Düsseldorf, German Empire
- Died: 7 March 1970 (aged 88); West Berlin, West Germany
- Occupations: Theater and film actress

Olga Limburg (5 April 1881 – 7 March 1970) was a German theater and film actress. She began her artistic career in 1901 with a commitment at the Municipal Theatre of Poznan. Since 1902, she played at several of Berlin's leading theaters including the Tribune, the Metropol Theatre, Berlin Lustspielhaus, the comedy and the Theater am Kurfürstendamm. During the early part of her theater career, Limburg usually played supporting roles. Later she worked in the "comical oldies" plays.

== Career ==
Limburg's film acting career started in 1907 with a minor role in the silent film Fest der Handwerker and followed by Der gelbe Tod, 1. Teil (1910). She also starred in major productions including Prinz Kuckuck (1919), Kean (1921) and Rudolf Meinert-directed Marie Antoinette, the Love of a King (1922). These films achieved her much acclaim as a supporting actress. She continued her acting career through the next decade and starred in talkies like Between Night and Dawn (1931), Ein Unsichtbarer geht durch die Stadt, The Black Forest Girl (both 1933), The Girl Irene (1936) Madame Bovary (1937), Napoleon Is to Blame for Everything, Five Million Look for an Heir (both 1938) and Hurrah! I'm a Father (1939) to name a few. It was during these two decades that she became one of the busiest actresses of the German cinema. She played roles of aunts, neighbors, housekeepers and other women next door. From 1919 to 1955, Limburg appeared in 49 films, including four alongside Heinz Rühmann, one of the most famous German actors of the 20th century.

Before her retirement from the film industry she acted in Nannete, Kleider machen Leute (both 1940), Lord of life and death (1954) and The Heart of St. Pauli (1957). Limburg died on 7 March 1970 at age 88. Her ashes were buried in the St. Anne's Cemetery.

== Selected filmography ==
- Cain (1918)
- Prince Cuckoo (1919)
- The Spinning Ball (1919)
- Respectable Women (1920)
- Kean (1921)
- Your Brother's Wife (1921)
- The Three Aunts (1921)
- The Dance of Love and Happiness (1921)
- Marie Antoinette, the Love of a King (1922)
- Your Bad Reputation (1922)
- The Cigarette Countess (1922)
- To the Ladies' Paradise (1922)
- The Love Nest (1922)
- The Big Shot (1922)
- The Marriage of Princess Demidoff (1922)
- The Unknown Tomorrow (1923)
- The Woman on the Panther (1923)
- La Boheme (1923)
- Judith (1923)
- The Love of a Queen (1923)
- The Ancient Law (1923)
- The Little Duke (1924)
- Spring Awakening (1924)
- Dudu, a Human Destiny (1924)
- Zigano (1925)
- The Humble Man and the Chanteuse (1925)
- Hedda Gabler (1925)
- Dancing Mad (1925)
- People to Each Other (1926)
- Her Husband's Wife (1926)
- The Good Reputation (1926)
- The Woman in the Cupboard (1927)
- The Trousers (1927)
- Eva in Silk (1928)
- Give Me Life (1928)
- Charlotte Somewhat Crazy (1928)
- Suzy Saxophone (1928)
- Daughter of the Regiment (1929)
- The Girl with the Whip (1929)
- Men Without Work (1929)
- Painted Youth (1929)
- The Man with the Frog (1929)
- Black Forest Girl (1929)
- Busy Girls (1930)
- The Citadel of Warsaw (1930)
- You'll Be in My Heart (1930)
- Terror of the Garrison (1931)
- Elisabeth of Austria (1931)
- The Office Manager (1931)
- Between Night and Dawn (1931)
- My Friend the Millionaire (1932)
- Distorting at the Resort (1932)
- And the Plains Are Gleaming (1933)
- The Black Forest Girl (1933)
- The Little Crook (1933)
- A Girl Whirls By the World (1934)
- Miss Madame (1934)
- Roses from the South (1934)
- Pygmalion (1935)
- Peter, Paul and Nanette (1935)
- His Late Excellency (1935)
- Lady Windermere's Fan (1935)
- Last Stop (1935)
- The Girl Irene (1936)
- Donogoo Tonka (1936)
- The Night With the Emperor (1936)
- Girls' Dormitory (1936)
- Victoria in Dover (1936)
- Madame Bovary (1937)
- Land of Love (1937)
- The Divine Jetta (1937)
- The Coral Princess (1937)
- Dangerous Game (1937)
- An Enemy of the People (1937)
- The Ways of Love Are Strange (1937)
- Adventure in Love (1938)
- Five Million Look for an Heir (1938)
- I Love You (1938)
- Mystery About Beate (1938)
- The Night of Decision (1938)
- Napoleon Is to Blame for Everything (1938)
- The Golden Mask (1939)
- Target in the Clouds (1939)
- The Merciful Lie (1939)
- Renate in the Quartet (1939)
- Hurrah! I'm a Father (1939)
- The Right to Love (1939)
- Nanette (1940)
- Herz ohne Heimat (1940)
- Diesel (1942)
- With the Eyes of a Woman (1942)
- My Friend Josephine (1942)
- A Cheerful House (1944)
- The Court Concert (1948)
- Don't Dream, Annette (1949)
- The Staircase (1950)
- Not Without Gisela (1951)
- Turtledove General Delivery (1952)
- We'll Talk About Love Later (1953)
- The Cousin from Nowhere (1953)
- The Seven Dresses of Katrin (1954)
- The Witch (1954)
- Master of Life and Death (1955)
- The Priest from Kirchfeld (1955)
- The Heart of St. Pauli (1957)

== Bibliography ==
- Kulik, Karol. Alexander Korda: The Man Who Could Work Miracles. Virgin Books, 1990.
- Wendtland, Helga; Wendtland, Karlheinz (1995). Geliebter Kintopp. Sämtliche deutsche Spielfilme von 1929 – 1945. Künstlerbiographien L–Z [Beloved flicks. All German feature films from 1929 - 1945 Artist Biographies L-Z] (in German). Berlin: Verlag Medium Film Karlheinz Wendtland. ISBN 3-926945-14-1.
- Hermanni, Horst O. (2011). Das Film ABC Band 5: Von La Jana bis Robert Mulligan (in German). BoD – Books on Demand. ISBN 978-3-8423-1154-1.
