= Five from the Jazz Band =

1932 film

- Directed by: Erich Engel
- Written by: Felix Jackson (play); Curt Alexander; Henry Koster
- Produced by: Hans Conradi; Joe Pasternak
- Starring: Jenny Jugo; Rolf von Goth; Fritz Klippel; Karel Stepanek
- Cinematography: Reimar Kuntze
- Edited by: Andrew Marton
- Music by: Theo Mackeben
- Production company: Deutsche Universal-Film
- Distributed by: Deutsche Universal-Film
- Release date: 19 March 1932
- Running time: 88 minutes
- Country: Germany
- Language: German

Five from the Jazz Band (German: Fünf von der Jazzband) is a 1932 German musical comedy film directed by Erich Engel and starring Jenny Jugo, Rolf von Goth, and Fritz Klippel. It is based on a 1927 play of the same name by Felix Jackson, and was produced by the German subsidiary of Universal Pictures. It was shot at the Johannisthal Studios in Berlin. The film's sets were designed by art director Erich Czerwonski.

== Plot ==
The wealthy American uncle of vacuum cleaner salesman Peter Pett stipulated in his will that Peter may only inherit the five million dollars left to him if he is happily married. Otherwise, the five million should go to Peter's Scottish cousin Patrick.

Commissioned by the executor, Mister Blubberbloom comes to Europe to see if Peter is happy with his wife Hix too. But the insidious Blubberboom brings Peter to New York without his wife and wants to have the beautiful Mabel appears as his wife at the performance there.

But Patrick, who looks confusingly like his cousin, also wants the money. He appears at Hix and travels with her to New York as well. In the Atlantic Hotel, everyone meets without meeting at first. There are confusing scenes, and even as a viewer it is difficult to tell which of the two Petts you are looking at. Eventually, Blubberbloom reveals himself to be a gangster and hides Hix to avoid meeting her husband. But in the end, Hix and Peter finally meet, hug, and this obvious happiness also decides about the millions. But Patrick doesn't go away empty-handed either: he won Mabel's heart.

== Cast ==
- Jenny Jugo as Jessie
- Rolf von Goth as Jim
- Fritz Klippel as Moritz
- Karel Stepanek as Jean
- Günther Vogdt as Bill
- Theo Shall as Martin
- Werner Pledath as Director
- Arthur Mainzer as Sasse
- Heinrich Gretler as Judge
- Erika Helmke-Dassel as Erika
- Peter Ihle as Bühnenmaler
- Fritz Melchior as Stage Manager
- Vera Spohr as Chambermaid
- Charles Puffy as Ansager beim Ringkampf
- Peter Lorre as Car thief
- Willi Schur as Bestohlener in Kneipe
- Gustav Püttjer as Bühnenarbeiter
- Theo Mackeben as Kapelmeister
- Walter Steinbeck as Spinner
- Henry Pleß
- Karl Hannemann
- Robert Klein-Lörk
- Ludwig Rüth
- Gerhard Bienert

== Bibliography ==
- Bock, Hans-Michael; Bergfelder, Tim, eds. (2009). The Concise Cinegraph: Encyclopaedia of German Cinema. New York: Berghahn Books. ISBN 978-1-57181-655-9.
