= Gypsies of the Night =

1932 film

- German film poster
- German: Zigeuner der Nacht
- Directed by: Hanns Schwarz
- Written by: Henry Koster
- Produced by: Herman Millakowsky
- Starring: Jenny Jugo; Hans Brausewetter; Paul Kemp
- Cinematography: Eugen Schüfftan
- Edited by: Herbert B. Fredersdorf
- Music by: Paul Abraham
- Production company: Hermann Millakowsky-Film
- Distributed by: Bavaria Film
- Release date: 31 October 1932
- Running time: 77 minutes
- Country: Germany
- Language: German

Gypsies of the Night (German: Zigeuner der Nacht) is a 1932 German film directed by Hanns Schwarz and starring Jenny Jugo, Hans Brausewetter, and Paul Kemp. A separate French-language version Happy Hearts was also released.

The film's sets were designed by the art director Ernö Metzner. It was partly shot on location at Hamburg Harbour.

== Cast ==
- Jenny Jugo as Lissy
- Hans Brausewetter as Karl
- Paul Kemp as Julius
- Anton Pointner as Oliver
- Paul Heidemann as Steffan
- Egon Brosig as Andreas
- Theo Lingen as Theo
- Willi Schur as Phill
- Julius Falkenstein as Jeweller von Holst
- Alfred Beierle as Detective Commissioner
