= Much Ado About Nixi =

1942 film

- German film poster
- German: Viel Lärm um Nixi
- Directed by: Erich Engel
- Written by: Hans Hömberg
- Produced by: Eberhard Klagemann
- Starring: Jenny Jugo; Albert Matterstock; Hans Leibelt
- Cinematography: Reimar Kuntze
- Edited by: Elise Lustig
- Music by: Giuseppe Becce
- Production company: Klagemann-Film
- Distributed by: Märkische-Panorama-Schneider
- Release date: 19 February 1942
- Running time: 105 minutes
- Country: Germany
- Language: German

Much Ado About Nixi (German: Viel Lärm um Nixi) is a 1942 German comedy film directed by Erich Engel and starring Jenny Jugo, Albert Matterstock and Hans Leibelt. It was shot at the Cinecittà studios in Rome. A separate Italian-language version was also produced.

== Cast ==
- Jenny Jugo as Nixi Barkas
- Albert Matterstock as Roland von Gabriel
- Hans Leibelt as Barkas, General manager
- Heinz Salfner as Augustus
- Otto Gebühr as village school teacher
- Fritz Hoopts as Captain
- Hans Adalbert Schlettow as Gendarm
- André Mattoni as Mäcki Fiori
- Maria Krahn
- Toni von Bukovics
- Ernst Rotmund
- Karl Hannemann
- Karl-Heinz Peters
- Klaus Pohl
- Maria von Schmedes as singer
- Theodor Danegger as vegetable trader
