= The Trousers =

1927 film

- Directed by: Hans Behrendt
- Written by: Carl Sternheim (play); Franz Schulz
- Starring: Werner Krauss; Jenny Jugo; Rudolf Forster; Veit Harlan
- Cinematography: Carl Drews
- Music by: Willy Schmidt-Gentner
- Production company: Phoebus-Film
- Distributed by: Phoebus-Film
- Release date: 20 August 1927
- Country: Germany
- Languages: Silent; German intertitles

The Trousers (German: Die Hose) is a 1927 German silent comedy film directed by Hans Behrendt and starring Werner Krauss, Jenny Jugo and Rudolf Forster. It was based on a play by Carl Sternheim. Art direction was by Heinrich Richter and Franz Schroedter. The film is notable for the performance of Veit Harlan, later the director who made the controversial antisemitic Jew Suss, as a Jewish barber in a film made by a director who later died in the holocaust.

== Cast ==
- Werner Krauss as Theobald Maske
- Jenny Jugo as Luise Maske
- Rudolf Forster as Scarron
- Veit Harlan as Mandelstam
- Christian Bummerstaedt as Fürst
- Olga Limburg as Elfri de Deuter

== Bibliography ==
- Kreimeier, Klaus. The Ufa Story: A History of Germany's Greatest Film Company, 1918-1945. University of California Press, 1999.
- Prawer, S.S. Between Two Worlds: The Jewish Presence in German and Austrian Film, 1910-1933. Berghahn Books, 2005.
