= Pygmalion (1935 film) =

- Directed by: Erich Engel
- Written by: Heinrich Oberländer Walter Wassermann
- Based on: Pygmalion by George Bernard Shaw
- Produced by: Eberhard Klagemann
- Starring: Jenny Jugo; Gustaf Gründgens; Anton Edthofer
- Cinematography: Bruno Mondi
- Edited by: René Métain
- Music by: Theo Mackeben
- Production company: Klagemann-Film
- Release date: 2 September 1935
- Running time: 92 minutes
- Country: Germany
- Language: German

Pygmalion is a 1935 German comedy film directed by Erich Engel and starring Jenny Jugo, Gustaf Gründgens and Anton Edthofer. It is based on George Bernard Shaw's 1913 play Pygmalion. The film's sets were designed by the art director Emil Hasler and Arthur Schwarz.

== Plot ==
A professor attempts to transform an uneducated flower seller into a proper lady.

== Cast ==
- Jenny Jugo as Eliza Doolittle
- Gustaf Gründgens as Professor Higgins
- Anton Edthofer as Oberst Pickering
- Eugen Klöpfer as Alfred Doolittle
- Hedwig Bleibtreu as Mrs. Higgins
- Käthe Haack as Mrs. Pearce
- Olga Limburg as Mrs. Hill
- Karin Evans as Klara Hill
- Vivigenz Eickstedt as Freddy Hill
- Erika Glässner as Betsy
- Hans Richter as Jonny
- Erna Morena
- Werner Pledath
- Josef Dahmen
- Ernst Behmer
- Erich Dunskus
- Oskar Höcker
- Wera Schultz

== Bibliography ==
- Goble, Alan (1999). The Complete Index to Literary Sources in Film. Walter de Gruyter GmbH. ISBN 978-3-598-11492-2.
