= Who Is This That I Love? =

1950 film directed by Géza von Bolváry

- Directed by: Géza von Bolváry
- Written by: Hugo Maria Kritz (novel); Hans Fritz Beckmann
- Produced by: Franz Schier; Wilhelm Sperber
- Starring: Jester Naefe; Adrian Hoven; Iván Petrovich
- Cinematography: Franz Weihmayr
- Edited by: Friedel Buckow
- Music by: Theo Mackeben
- Production company: Merkur-Film
- Distributed by: Herzog Film
- Release date: 15 November 1950
- Running time: 100 minutes
- Country: West Germany
- Language: German

Who Is This That I Love? (German: Wer bist du, den ich liebe?) is a 1950 West German musical comedy film directed by Géza von Bolváry and starring Jester Naefe, Adrian Hoven, and Iván Petrovich. It was shot at the Wiesbaden and Bavaria Studios and on location around Lake Starnberg. The film's sets were designed by the art directors Fritz Lück and Hans Sohnle.

== Synopsis ==
When her father dies, Beatrix decides to collect the gambling debts owed to him. However, several of his former card playing partners plead poverty to get out of their obligations, but she is very persistent. She meets and likes Franz, the student son of one of the debtors who she believes is penniless. In fact, he is very wealthy, and a sophisticated fortune hunter, Livia, has her eyes on him. Beatrix sets out to thwart Livia and secure Franz for herself.

== Cast ==
- Jester Naefe as Beatrix
- Adrian Hoven as Franz
- Iván Petrovich as Andreas Ostenhof
- Gisela Fackeldey as Livia
- Walter Janssen as Regendantz, Minister a.D.
- Bum Krüger as Felix
- Rudolf Schündler as Stefan
- Peter Hansmann as Hubert
- Adolf Gondrell as Bonora
- Gustav Waldau as Pfarrer
- Anton Pointner as Malibran
- Fritz Odemar as Diener Michael
- Hans Fitz as Bürgermeister
- Hubert von Meyerinck as Zauberer
- Viktor Afritsch
- Charles Jacquemar
- Günther Evers
- Fritz Friedrich
- Dolf Zenzen
- Ina Renck
- Grete Reinwald
- Hans Schulz
- Bernhard Schabel
- Georg Vogelsang
- Franz Fröhlich
- Annerose Siedler
- Günther Siegert
- Marieluise Riexinger

== Bibliography ==
- Bock, Hans-Michael; Bergfelder, Tim, eds. (2009). The Concise Cinegraph: Encyclopaedia of German Cinema. New York: Berghahn Books. ISBN 978-1-57181-655-9.
