= The League of Three =

1929 film

- German: Der Bund der Drei
- Directed by: Hans Behrendt
- Written by: Victor Abel; Bobby E. Lüthge
- Produced by: Alfred Zeisler
- Starring: Jenny Jugo; Max Maximilian; Ernst Stahl-Nachbaur
- Cinematography: Werner Brandes
- Music by: Willy Schmidt-Gentner
- Production company: UFA
- Distributed by: UFA
- Release date: 12 December 1929
- Country: Germany
- Languages: Silent; German intertitles

The League of Three (German: Der Bund der Drei) is a 1929 German silent crime film directed by Hans Behrendt and starring Jenny Jugo, Max Maximilian and Ernst Stahl-Nachbaur. The film's art direction was by Willi Herrmann. It premiered at the Ufa-Pavillon am Nollendorfplatz.

== Cast ==
- Jenny Jugo as Inez
- Max Maximilian as Diaz, Inez's Vater
- Ernst Stahl-Nachbaur as Renard
- Friedrich Benfer as Henri, Renards Sohn
- Raimondo Van Riel as Baramo
- Michael von Newlinsky as Gaston
- Kurt Katch as Morris
- Viktor Gehring as Privatdetektiv
- Alfred Beierle as Hausmeister
