= The Three Codonas =

1940 film directed by Arthur Maria Rabenalt

- German: Die drei Codonas
- Directed by: Arthur Maria Rabenalt
- Written by: Joachim Friedrich Bremer; Kurt Heuser; Philipp Lothar Mayring
- Produced by: Herbert Engelsing
- Starring: René Deltgen; Ernst von Klipstein; Josef Sieber
- Cinematography: Friedl Behn-Grund
- Edited by: Hans Heinrich
- Music by: Peter Kreuder
- Production company: Tobis Film
- Distributed by: Tobis Film
- Release date: 1 August 1940
- Running time: 109 minutes
- Country: Germany
- Language: German

The Three Codonas (German: Die drei Codonas) is a 1940 German drama film directed by Arthur Maria Rabenalt and starring René Deltgen, Ernst von Klipstein and Josef Sieber. It is based on the life of the circus performer Alfredo Codona. It was made by Tobis Film, one of the largest German production companies. The film's sets were designed by the art director Emil Hasler. It premiered in Hamburg, twelve days before its first Berlin screening at the UFA-Palast am Zoo.

== Cast ==
- René Deltgen as Alfredo Codona
- Ernst von Klipstein as Lalo Codona
  - Udo Fanselau as Lalo Codona as a child
- Josef Sieber as Edward Codona
- Annelies Reinhold as Lillian Leitzel
- Lena Norman as Vera Bruce
- Friedl Haerlin as Kunstreiterin
- Harald Paulsen as Flatcher
- Karl Kahlmann as Jack Ringling
- Leopold von Ledebur as Joe Ringling
- Ethel Reschke as Hopp-Bubi
- Walter Lieck as Langnase
- Anton Pointner as Mustacho
- Peter Elsholtz as Rastelli
- Paul Verhoeven as Jewelry-Max
- Otto Stoeckel as Sheriff
- Horst Birr as lonely young man
- Armin Münch as graphic designer
- Fritz Böttger as Blondell
- Paul Samson-Körner as Boxer
- Armin Schweizer as Direktor im 'Valencia'
- Margarete Kupfer as Lieschke's mother
- Wilhelm König as Frankie
- Friedrich Ettel as Director Schuch
- Valy Arnheim as Auktionator
- Klaus Pohl as Gnome-like male
- Paul Funk as Equerry
- Bernhard Goetzke as Clown
- Ernst Stimmel as Tierarzt
- Karl Hannemann as Farmer Snokes
- Werner Pledath as department store director
- Franz Arzdorf as department store manager
- Leo Sloma as Barwirt
- Irmgard Paetzold as Miss 1914
- Chiqui Jonas as Girl #1
- Hansjakob Gröblinghoff as Bellman
- Albert Venohr as doorman in conservatory
- Paul Hildebrandt as chief physician in Copenhagen
- Karl-Heinz Peters as assembly man
- Hanns Waschatko as doctor at Ringling
- Liesl Eckardt as Scheuerfrau
- Maria Köhler as Girl at Ringling #1
- Irene Fischer as Girl at Ringling #4
- Arthur von Doissy as Alfredos Arzt
- Adolf Fischer as employee at the buffer kitchen
- Hans Bergmann as Bandmaster at Ringling
- Rose Weidemann
- Pia Körner as up keeper in the conservatory
- Christine Grossmann as cigarette seller
- Angelo Ferrari as Italian reporter
- Charlotte Heimburg
- Friedegard Moldenhauer-Arzdorf as Girl at Ringling #3
- Kurt Liebfried
- Jutta Feuge
- Fritz Draeger
- Walter Flamm as Gratulant at Mutter Lieschke
- Charles Francois as waiter
- Bruno Tillessen
- Lucie Becker as a Girl at Ringling #2

== Bibliography ==
- Klaus, Ulrich J. Deutsche Tonfilme: Jahrgang 1940. Klaus-Archiv, 1988.
