= Curt Alexander =

German writer (1900-1945)

- Born: 15 November 1900; Berlin, Prussia, German Empire
- Died: 4 April 1945 (aged 44); Gröditz, Bavaria, Nazi Germany
- Occupation: Screenwriter
- Years active: 1931–1942 (film)

Curt Alexander (1900-1945) was a German screenwriter. He originally worked as a dramaturge and theatre director before moving into film after the introduction of sound. Following the rise of the Nazi Party the Jewish Alexander emigrated to France working there and in Italy. He was a friend of fellow exile Max Ophüls, making several films with him including Everybody's Woman. After the German invasion of France in 1940 he fled to the Unoccupied Zone in the south of the country, working in 1942 on his final film Twilight at the Victorine Studios in Nice. He was subsequently arrested, taken to the Drancy internment camp and the deported to Flossenbürg concentration camp in Bavaria, where he died in the subcamp at Gröditz.

== Selected filmography ==
- Who Takes Love Seriously? (1931)
- The Bartered Bride (1932)
- The Leap into the Void (1932)
- Five from the Jazz Band (1932)
- A City Upside Down (1933)
- Liebelei (1933)
- Toto (1933)
- Everybody's Woman (1934)
- The Tender Enemy (1936)
- The Make Believe Pirates (1937)
- Tomb of the Angels (1937)
- Boefje (1939)
- There's No Tomorrow (1939)
- Sarajevo (1940)
- Threats (1940)
- Twilight (1944)

== Bibliography ==
- Waldman, Harry. Nazi Films in America, 1933-1942. McFarland, 2008.
- Williams, Alan L. Republic of Images: A History of French Filmmaking. Harvard University Press, 1992.
