= Heinz Salfner =

German actor (1877–1945)

- Born: 31 December 1877; Munich, German Empire
- Died: 13 October 1945 (aged 67); Berlin, Germany
- Occupation: Actor
- Years active: 1914–1945 (film)

Heinz Salfner (31 December 1877 – 13 October 1945) was a German stage and film actor. Salfner appeared in more than sixty films during his career. He played the lead in the 1932 crime film A Shot at Dawn.

== Selected filmography ==
- The Skull of Pharaoh's Daughter (1920)
- Youth (1922)
- Judith (1923)
- The Fifth Street (1923)
- Time Is Money (1923)
- The Beautiful Girl (1923)
- Luther (1928)
- Guilty (1928)
- The Stranger (1931)
- A Shot at Dawn (1932)
- A Mad Idea (1932)
- And the Plains Are Gleaming (1933)
- Gold (1934)
- I Love All the Women (1935)
- I Was Jack Mortimer (1935)
- Lady Windermere's Fan (1935)
- Victoria in Dover (1936)
- Tomfoolery (1936)
- A Wedding Dream (1936)
- Scandal at the Fledermaus (1936)
- A Hoax (1936)
- Donogoo Tonka (1936)
- Love's Awakening (1936)
- Togger (1937)
- Five Million Look for an Heir (1938)
- Marionette (1939)
- Anton the Last (1939)
- A Hopeless Case (1939)
- Our Miss Doctor (1940)
- Much Ado About Nixi (1942)
- The Rainer Case (1942)
- A Salzburg Comedy (1943)
- Heaven, We Inherit a Castle (1943)
- Die Fledermaus (1946)
- Friday the Thirteenth (1949)

== Bibliography ==
- Youngkin, Stephen. The Lost One: A Life of Peter Lorre. University Press of Kentucky, 2005.
