= Don't Dream, Annette =

1949 film

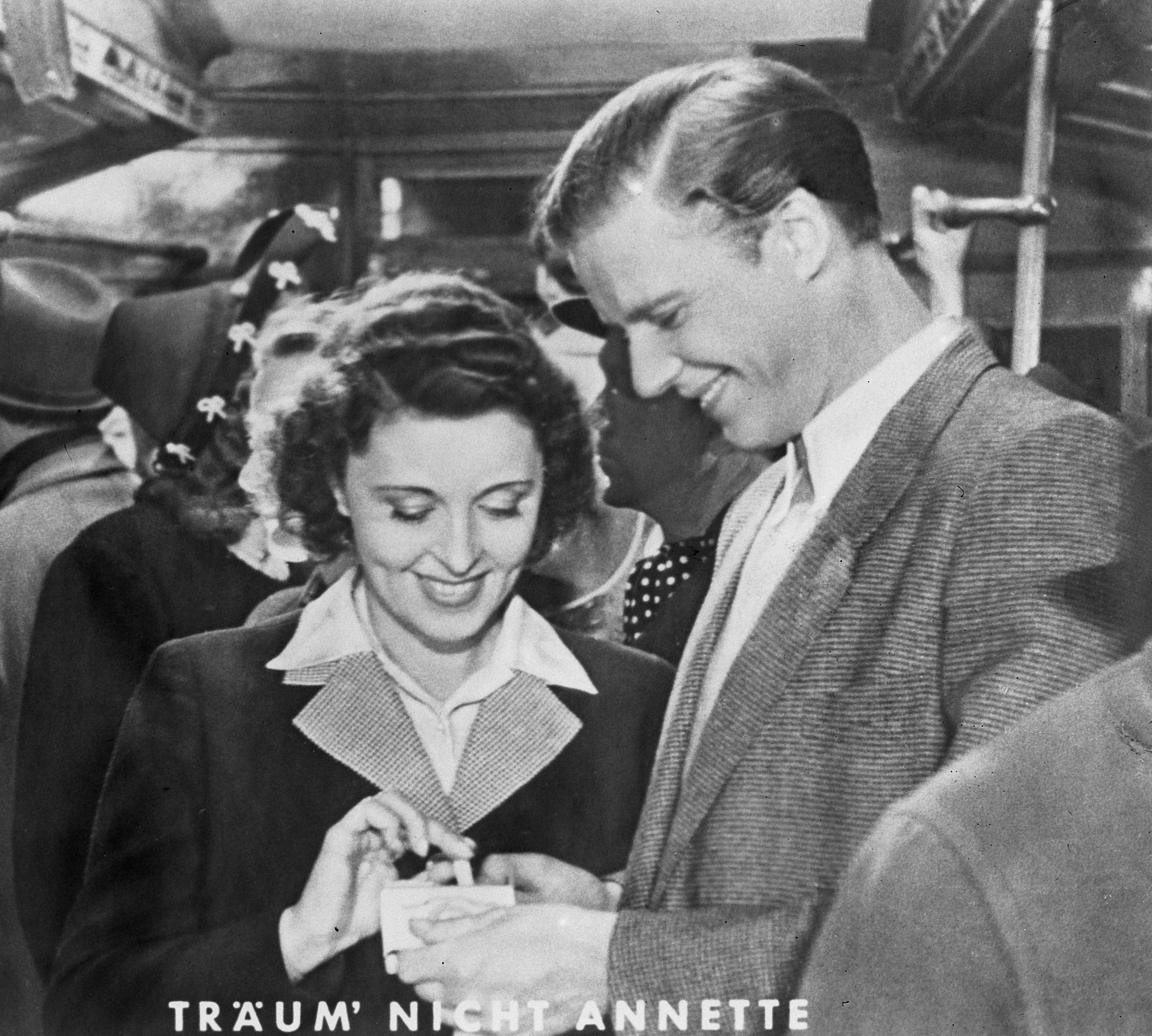
- German film poster
- German: Träum' nicht, Annette
- Directed by: Eberhard Klagemann; Helmut Weiss
- Written by: Frank Clifford; Fritz Schwiefert
- Starring: Jenny Jugo; Max Eckard; Karl Schönböck
- Cinematography: Reimar Kuntze
- Edited by: Johanna Meisel
- Music by: Theo Mackeben
- Production company: DEFA
- Distributed by: VEB Progress Film
- Release date: 4 February 1949
- Running time: 115 minutes
- Country: Germany
- Language: German

Don't Dream, Annette (German: Träum' nicht, Annette) is a 1949 German comedy film directed by Eberhard Klagemann and Helmut Weiss and starring Jenny Jugo, Max Eckard and Karl Schönböck. It was made by DEFA in the Soviet Zone of Germany which was soon afterwards to become East Germany. The film's sets were designed by the art directors Wilhelm Depenau, Otto Erdmann and Kurt Herlth.

== Synopsis ==
Attractive French teacher Annette has two devoted suitors, the diplomat Klaus and the engineer Theo, who both propose marriage to her. She then meets the pianist Hans who she is also quickly interested in. She dreams of what her future would be if she married each of the men.

== Cast ==
- Jenny Jugo as Annette
- Max Eckard as Hans
- Karl Schönböck as Klaus
- Helmuth Rudolph as Theo
- Gustav Waldau as The last Bourbone
- Hans Stiebner as visitor in the concert hall
- Walter Werner as visitor in the concert hall
- Olga Limburg as Frau von Condé
- Else Reval as Berta - Dienstmädchen
- Erich Timm as Karl
- Erwin Biegel as retired civil servant
- Antonie Jaeckel as his wife
- Erich Dunskus as bookbinder
- Erik von Loewis as Monsieur Picard
- Werner Segtrop as steward
- Axel Triebel as Bourgeois
- Paul Bildt
- Waltraud Engel
- O. W. Fischer
- Lotte Jürgens
- Waltraud Kogel
- Leopold von Ledebur
- Helmut Wolff
