= Jenny Jugo =

Austrian actress (1904–2001)

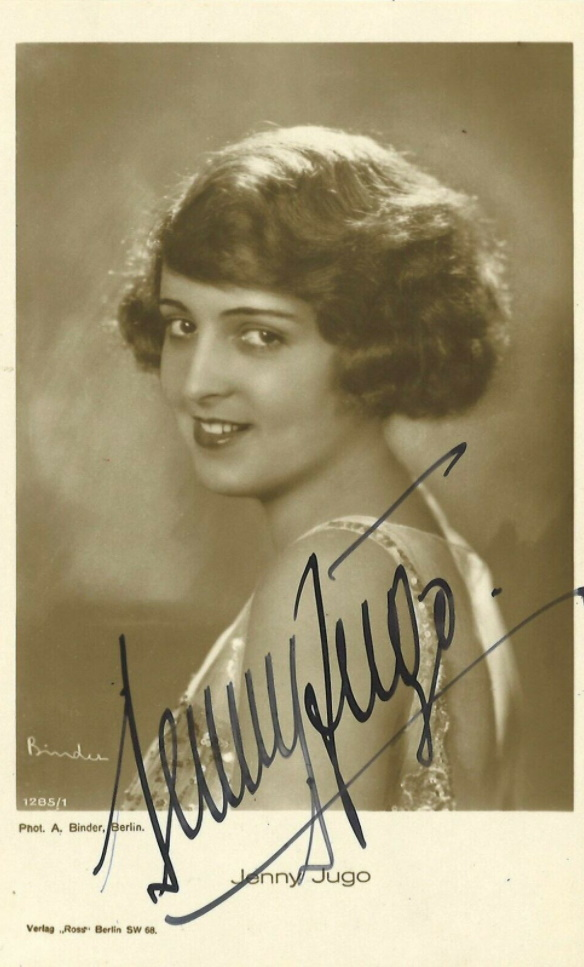
- Jenny Jugo c. 1926
- Born: Eugenie Walter; 14 June 1904; Mürzzuschlag, Duchy of Styria, Austria-Hungary
- Died: 30 September 2001 (aged 97); Schwaighofen, Bavaria, Germany
- Occupation: Actress
- Years active: 1925–1950
- Spouses: Emo Jugo (m. 1921; div. 1922) Friedrich Benfer (m. 1950; died 1996)

Jenny Jugo (born Eugenie Walter; 14 June 1904 – 30 September 2001) was an Austrian actress. She appeared in more than fifty films between 1925 and 1950.

== Biography ==
Jenny Jugo was born Eugenie Walter on 14 June 1904, the daughter of a factory owner. After being educated in a convent, she married the actor Emo Jugo and accompanied him to Berlin. Although the marriage was short-lived, she continued to use his surname throughout her career.

== Career ==
Jugo was placed under contract by the German studio UFA in 1924, but struggled in early dramatic roles. Towards the end of the silent era, she fared much better in comedies and this trend continued into the 1930s.

She became known for her portrayal of bouncy, assertive characters. Many of her films during this period were directed by Erich Engel.

She continued making films during the Nazi era until 1943, spending much of the rest of her time at her home in Bavaria.

She was in a relationship with the producer Eberhard Klagemann who oversaw her final three post-war productions, including the DEFA comedy Don't Dream, Annette (1949).

She often co-starred with her later husband, Friedrich Benfer. In 1950 she married Benfer and retired from acting at the age of 46.

In 1971 she received a lifetime achievement award for her outstanding contribution to German cinema.

== Filmography ==
- The Tower of Silence (1925)
- The Found Bride (1925)
- If Only It Weren't Love (1925)
- Frisian Blood (1925)
- The Fire Dancer (1925)
- Ship in Distress (1925)
- Express Train of Love (1925)
- The Doll of Luna Park (1925)
- The Battle Against Berlin (1926)
- Love is Blind (1926)
- Unmarried Daughters (1926)
- The Loves of Casanova (1927)
- The Indiscreet Woman (1927)
- The Trousers (1927)
- The Queen of Spades (1927)
- Prinz Louis Ferdinand (1927)
- Looping the Loop (1928)
- Six Girls and a Room for the Night (1928)
- Docks of Hamburg (1928)
- The Blue Mouse (1928)
- The League of Three (1929)
- The Smuggler's Bride of Mallorca (1929)
- The Flight from Love (1929)
- The Great Longing (1930)
- Heute nacht – eventuell (1930)
- Who Takes Love Seriously? (1931)
- Headfirst into Happiness (1931)
- I'll Stay with You (1931)
- Five from the Jazz Band (1932)
- Gypsies of the Night (1932)
- The Naked Truth (1932)
- A Song for You (1933)
- A City Upside Down (1933)
- There Is Only One Love (1933)
- Miss Madame (1934)
- ...heute abend bei mir (1934)
- Hearts are Trumps (1934)
- Hard Luck Mary (1934)
- Pygmalion (1935)
- Tomfoolery (1936)
- Victoria in Dover (1936)
- The Night With the Emperor (1936)
- Dangerous Game (1937)
- The Great and the Little Love (1938)
- The Stars Shine (1938)
- A Hopeless Case (1939)
- Our Miss Doctor (1940)
- Nanette (1940)
- Much Ado About Nixi (1942)
- Non mi sposo più (1942)
- Die Gattin (1943)
- Don't Dream, Annette (1949)
- Land der Sehnsucht (1950)
- Royal Children (1950)

== Bibliography ==
- Bock, Hans-Michael; Bergfelder, Tim (2009). The Concise Cinegraph: Encyclopaedia of German Cinema. New York: Berghahn Books. Page 228. ISBN 9780857455659.
- Hardt, Ursula. From Caligari to California: Erich Pommer's Life in the International Film Wars. New York: Berghahn Books. 1996. Page 169. ISBN 978-1-57181-025-0/ISBN 978-1-57181-930-7.
