= Ernst Schiffner =

German actor

Ernst Günther Schiffner (23 July 1903, Marienwerder, West Prussia – 20 March 1980, Hamburg or Celle) was a German actor and director.

== Life ==
The merchant's son had already played theater since 1919 and received his first roles at the Schauspielhaus in his native Marienwerder. Further engagements led him all over the German province, among others to Bonn, Mainz and Magdeburg. When the National Socialists came to power, Schiffner found himself in Berlin and worked there at various venues: the Theater at the Behrenstraße, the Volksbühne and the Metropol-Theater. During the war (1939 until the closure of all German theatres in summer 1944) Ernst Schiffner belonged to the ensemble of the Neues Deutsches Theater Prague.

Schiffner, who is said to have already played about 20 roles in silent films – titles cannot be found at present – has been intensively in front of the camera since his arrival in Berlin. He covered the entire range of classical batches: he was seen as stage manager as well as king of Saxony, commissioner as well as mayor, police officer as well as taxi driver, court reporter as well as carousel operator.

After the war, Schiffner concentrated again on the stage and worked as artistic director in Celle and Hanover, among other places. In the 1952/53 season he can be seen as a director and actor at the Städtische Bühnen in Gelsenkirchen in the operetta section. Since 1955 he found employment (acting and directing) at the Vereinigte Städtischen Bühnen Krefeld and Mönchengladbach as well as again in Bonn and at the Harburger Theater. In between (1954) he also worked at the Deutsches Theater Berlin. In 1961 Schiffner was hired as an actor and director at the Saarländische Landestheater in Saarbrücken.

In these late years Ernst Schiffner hardly found time for appearances in front of the camera. After 1945 he only appeared very rarely in movies and only occasionally, especially in the late 60's, in television productions. There he was mainly seen as an honorary judge (judge, professor, city captain). Schiffner probably died in Hamburg or in Celle.

== Filmography (partial) ==
- Playing with Fire (1934)
- Pechmarie (1934)
- Hard Luck Mary (1934)
- Artisten (1935)
- Die klugen Frauen (1935)
- Victoria in Dover (1936)
- City of Anatol (1936)
- The Night With the Emperor (1936)
- Fridericus (1936)
- The Irresistible Man (1937)
- Between the Parents (1937)
- Schüsse in Kabine 7 (1937)
- Triad (1938)
- Skandal um den Hahn (1938)
- Heimat (1938)
- Du und ich (1938)
- The Four Companions (1938)
- The Wedding Trip (1939)
- Men Are That Way (1939)
- Umwege zum Glück (1939)
- Who's Kissing Madeleine? (1939)
- Die fremde Frau (1939)
- Golowin geht durch die Stadt (1940)
- Die lustigen Vagabunden (1940)
- Happiness Is the Main Thing (1941)
- Blutsbrüderschaft (1941)
- Sein Sohn (1941)
- We Make Music (1942)
- Doctor Crippen (1942)
- I Entrust My Wife to You (1943)
- Das schwarze Schaf (1943)
- Dog Days (1944)
- Es lebe die Liebe (1944)
- Bravo, Little Thomas (1945)
- Der große Fall (1949)
- Viennese Girls (1949)
- Herzen im Sturm (1950
- Love Now, Pay Later (19590
- Final Destination: Red Lantern (1960)
- Kein Freibrief für Mord (1965, TV)
- Der Fall Wera Sassulitsch (1968, TV)
- Gnade für Timothy Evans (1969, TV)

== Bibliography ==
- Kürschners Biographisches Theater-Handbuch, Berlin 1956; S. 644
- Glenzdorfs Internationales Film-Lexikon, Band 3, Bad Münder 1961, S. 1494

== Sources ==
- http://www.imdb.com/name/nm0771538
- https://d-nb.info/gnd/1062322932
- Ernst G. Schiffner bei filmportal.de (in german)
