= Our Miss Doctor =

1940 film

- Directed by: Erich Engel
- Written by: Fritz Schwiefert
- Produced by: Eberhard Klagemann
- Starring: Jenny Jugo; Albert Matterstock; Heinz Salfner; Hans Schwarz Jr.
- Cinematography: Massimo Terzano
- Edited by: Conrad von Molo
- Music by: Hans-Otto Borgmann
- Production company: Klagemann-Film
- Distributed by: Various
- Release date: 20 December 1940
- Running time: 94 minutes
- Country: Germany
- Language: German

Our Miss Doctor (German: Unser Fräulein Doktor) is a 1940 German comedy film directed by Erich Engel and starring Jenny Jugo, Albert Matterstock and Heinz Salfner. It was shot at the Tempelhof Studios in Berlin. The film's sets were designed by the art director Karl Haacker and Karl Weber.

== Synopsis ==
A male teacher at a school slowly comes to appreciate one of his female colleagues both as a teacher and a woman.

== Cast ==
- Jenny Jugo as Dr. Elisabeth Hansen
- Albert Matterstock as Dr. Karl Klinger
- Heinz Salfner as Der Direktor
- Hans Schwarz Jr. as Turnlehrer Jahnke
- Hans Richter as Heinz Müller, Primaner
- Gustav Waldau as Schuldiener Nießer
- Josefine Dora as Frau Nießner
- Hugo Werner-Kahle as Der Schulrat
- Werner Pledath as Der Chefarzt der Klinik
- Paul Bildt as Ein Universitätsprofessor
- Gunnar Möller as Ernst Schultze, Sextaner
- Rainer Penkert as Bierlinger, Primaner
- Rudolf Reinhard as Hans Vogelsang, Sextaner
- Horst Rossius as Fritz Bührle, Sextaner
- Bruno Roth as Alfred Zimmermann, Primaner
- Helmut Withrich as Wolfgang Schumann, Primaner
- Karl Hannemann
- Wolfgang Heise
- John Pauls-Harding

== Bibliography ==
- Hake, Sabine. Popular Cinema of the Third Reich. University of Texas Press, 2001.
