= Everybody's Woman =

1934 film

- Directed by: Max Ophüls
- Written by: Novel: Salvator Gotta; Screenplay: Curt Alexander; Hans Wilhelm; Max Ophüls
- Produced by: Angelo Rizzoli
- Starring: Isa Miranda; Memo Benassi; Tatyana Pavlova
- Cinematography: Ubaldo Arata
- Edited by: Ferdinando Maria Poggioli
- Music by: Daniele Amfitheatrof
- Production company: Novella Film
- Distributed by: Societa Anonima Stefano Pittaluga
- Release date: 13 August 1934 (Italy)
- Running time: 97 minutes
- Country: Italy
- Language: Italian

Everybody's Woman (Italian: La signora di tutti) is a 1934 Italian drama film directed by Max Ophüls and starring Isa Miranda, Memo Benassi and Tatyana Pavlova. It is the only film Max Ophüls made in Italy. The film was a success and Isa Miranda became a star. It was shot at the Cines Studios in Rome and on location in Canzo.

== Plot ==
Gabriella Murge, alias Gaby Doriot (Miranda), is a famous film star and fascinating adventuress with whom men cannot help falling in love. Having brought several of them to their ruin, she slits her wrists. The movie opens with Gaby having attempted suicide. In the hospital, the anesthetic gas she is given induces the flashbacks which make up the entire movie.

First, a young Gaby is expelled from her school when her music teacher falls in love with her, and then flees abroad, leaving his family. Later, after being confined to her home, she is invited to a party by Roberto Nanni, the son of the wealthy Leonardo Nanni, a businessman. At the party, they dance and Roberto falls in love with her. Their encounter is interrupted by Roberto's ill mother Alma, who is fearful of Gaby's reputation, but who eventually loves her as well. Gaby goes to their house to take care of Alma, and while Roberto goes on a trip to Rome, Leonardo falls in love with Gaby. One night, Leonardo invites Gaby to a private talk in the garden, and meanwhile, Alma, having put on music to go to bed, calls out for Gaby. Not hearing a response, Alma becomes frantic, and in desperation, falls down the stairs in her wheelchair, killing herself.

After Alma's death, Leonardo and Gaby go on a seemingly endless trip across Europe, despite the calls of Leonardo's business associates to return, and when they finally return, Gaby is haunted by the memory of the house and goes crazy. Gaby leaves Leonardo, telling him he should be with his wife, even if she is dead, and soon after, Leonardo is charged with embezzlement and sentenced to 4 years in prison. Meanwhile, Gaby becomes a huge movie star. When released from prison, Leonardo wanders around the foyer of the theater, looking at all the images of Gaby, until being expelled for being improperly dressed for the occasion (not in evening attire). Outside, he's run over by a car.

To avoid a scandal, Gaby's managers and entourage call in Roberto to exonerate her, and Gaby realizes that she's loved Roberto all along. Gaby then finds out that Roberto married her sister Anna, after meeting at the auction of his father's house. Gaby commits suicide, leaving a note detailing her loneliness that persisted through her stardom. At the end of the film, the anesthetic mask is removed, the doctors confirm her death, and the printing presses stop printing the poster for her film.

== Cast ==
- Isa Miranda as Gabriella Murge, alias Gaby Doriot
- Memo Benassi as Leonardo Nanni
- Tatyana Pavlova as Alma Nanni
- Friedrich Benfer as Roberto Nanni
- Franco Coop as L'impresario Veraldi
- Lamberto Picasso as Signor Murge, padre di Gaby e Anna
- Nelly Corradi as Anna Murge
- Mario Ferrari as Il produttore cinamatografico
- Andrea Checchi as Un amico di Roberto
- Achille Majeroni as Il portiere del teatro

== Bibliography ==
- Moliterno, Gino. The A to Z of Italian Cinema. Scarecrow Press, 2009.
