= Hedwig Wangel =

German actress

- Born: Amalie Pauline Hedwig Simon; September 23, 1875; Berlin, German Empire
- Died: March 12, 1961 (aged 85); Rendsburg, West Germany
- Occupation: Film actor
- Years active: 1926 - 1958

Hedwig Wangel (1875–1961) was a German stage and film actress.

== Life and career ==
Born as Amalie Pauline Hedwig Simon on September 23, 1875, in Berlin in the German Empire, Hedwig Wangel was the daughter of a music publisher. After studying acting with Max Grube, she made her theatrical debut in 1893 in Urania. Following performances for the remainder of the decade in theaters across Germany, during which she was a member of Max Reinhardt's Deutsches Theater, she then toured England during 1901 and 1902 and the Netherlands during 1902 and 1903, when she retired suddenly, began to provide care for homeless men and women, and assisted the Salvation Army and the Berliner Prisoner Association. Launching her own production company in 1925, she returned to films with the studio UFA the following year. That same year, she also founded the Gate of Hope, an asylum for women who had recently been freed from prison. Ultimately establishing a charitable foundation which bore her name, she recruited fellow artists and leaders in the scientific community to assist with her work and join her organization's leadership board. Among those who volunteered their services were Albert Einstein, Käthe Kollwitz, and the poet Else Lasker-Schüler.

== Selected filmography ==
- The Woman's Crusade (1926) as the woman's porter
- State Attorney Jordan (1926) as Mrs. Hecker
- The Priest from Kirchfeld (1926)
- Superfluous People (1926) as Duboff's wife
- The Last Horse Carriage in Berlin (1926) as Auguste Lüdecke
- A Modern Dubarry (1927) as Rosalie
- The Sporck Battalion (1927) as Witwe Retelsdorf
- The Convicted (1927)
- Give Me Life (1928)
- Queen Louise (1927) as Frederica Louisa of Hesse-Darmstadt
- Rasputin (1928) as Princess Vorontsov
- Flachsmann the Educator (1930) as Madame von Jan Flemming
- A Thousand Words of German (1930) as Harfenjule
- Pension Schöller (1930) as Mrs. Krüger
- Who Takes Love Seriously? (1931) as the landlady
- The Office Manager (1931) as a member of the cycling club
- Gloria (1931) as Frieda
- The Testament of Cornelius Gulden (1932) as Mrs. Winter
- Spell of the Looking Glass (1932) as Witwe Schramm
- Frederica (1932)
- Three from the Unemployment Office (1932) as the welfare lady
- The Escape to Nice (1932) as Ramona's mother
- Under False Flag (1932) as Frl. Schmidt, Garderobiere
- Travelling People (1938) as Yvonne the circus housekeeper
- Liberated Hands (1939) as Mrs. Steinmann
- Enemies (1940) as Liska
- Uncle Kruger (1941) as Queen Victoria
- Comrades (1941)
- The Way to Freedom (1941) as Barbaccia
- What Does Brigitte Want? (1941) as Klara Lehmann
- Beloved World (1942) as Mrs. Pilz
- Violanta (1942) as Mrs. Zureiss
- The Endless Road (1943) as Susan Harper
- The Master of the Estate (1943) as Malena, Wirtschafterin
- Die Feuerzangenbowle (1944) as Crey's housekeeper
- Journey to Happiness (1948) as Großmutter Loevengaard
- Amico (1949) as Mrs. Fiebig
- Love '47 (1949) as Madame Beckmann
- Doctor Praetorius (1950)
- Royal Children (1950) as Mrs. von Bockh
- Mathilde Möhring (1950)
- The Secret of a Marriage (1951) as Haushälterin
- Hanna Amon (1951) as Mrs. Zorneder
- Roses Bloom on the Moorland (1952)as Kräuterjule
- Everything for Father (1953) as Klara
- Ave Maria (1953) as the matron
- The Village Under the Sky (1953) as Luccia
- Roses in Autumn (1955) as Konsulin Rhode
- Without You All Is Darkness (1956) as Julchen
- The Cheese Factory in the Hamlet (1958)

== Bibliography ==
- Shandley, Robert R. Rubble Films: German Cinema in the Shadow of the Third Reich. Temple University Press, 2001.
