= The Night With the Emperor =

1936 film

- Directed by: Erich Engel
- Written by: Ernst Marischka; Heinrich Oberländer
- Produced by: Eberhard Klagemann
- Starring: Jenny Jugo; Richard Romanowsky; Friedrich Benfer
- Cinematography: Bruno Mondi
- Edited by: Carl Otto Bartning
- Music by: Hans-Otto Borgmann
- Production company: Klagemann-Film
- Distributed by: Rota-Film
- Release date: 22 December 1936
- Running time: 101 minutes
- Country: Germany
- Language: German

The Night With the Emperor (German: Die Nacht mit dem Kaiser) is a 1936 German historical comedy film directed by Erich Engel and starring Jenny Jugo, Richard Romanowsky, and Friedrich Benfer. It was shot at the Johannisthal Studios of Tobis Film in Berlin. The film's sets were designed by the art directors Karl Haacker and Hermann Warm. The film is set in 1808 at the Congress of Erfurt.

== Cast ==
- Jenny Jugo as Lisa Grossinger
- Richard Romanowsky as Thomas Kellermeister
- Friedrich Benfer as Heinz Heckmann
- Hans Zesch-Ballot as Napoleon
- Werner Scharf as De Brusset, Adjutant
- Hans Leibelt as Bürgermeister von Erfurt
- Walter Steinbeck as Director of Erfurt theatre
- Paul Henckels as Manager of Erfurt theatre
- Ernst G. Schiffner as King of Sachsen
- Otto Wögerer as Russian Tsar
- Olga Limburg as Kammerfrau
- Erika Helmke as Primadonna Elisabeth Frühwirt
- Harry Frank as Schauspieler
- Karl Platen as Intendant des Erfurter Stadttheaters
- Theodor Thony as Napoleons Kammerdiener Lucien
- Luise Hohorst as Lisa's wardrober
- Angelo Ferrari as Russian general
- Hans Schneider as Adjutant of King of Sachsen
- Julius Brandt as Police president in Erfurt
- Valy Arnheim as Leiter des Sicherheitsdienstes
- Walter Bechmann as Napoleon's Kammerdiener
- Fred Becker as Student
- Horst Birr as Student
- Kurt Cramer as King of Wurtemberg
- Wolf Dietrich as Student
- Aribert Grimmer as Erfurt citizen
- Karl Hannemann as French soldier in Erfurt
- Hans Ludwig Hilmers as Prince Wilhelm
- Charlie Albert Huber as Student
- Antonie Jaeckel as Kellermanns Vermieterin
- Ly Jankowski as Dame in Napoleon's Theaterloge
- Carl Martin Kemper as French general
- Fritz Klaudius as Erfurt citizen
- Walter Kunkel as Student
- Max Mothes as Der Inspizient
- Waltraud Neckes as Die Souffleuse
- Lotte Preuss as Eine Schauspielerin am Stadttheater
- Rudolf Preuss as Young officer
- Ernst Albert Schaach as Police officer in Erfurt
- Alfred Schwarz as Young officer
- Jörn Valery
- Jens von Hagen as Russian general
- Eduard Wenck as Gemüsehändler
- Friedrich Wilke as Student

== Bibliography ==
- Bock, Hans-Michael; Bergfelder, Tim, eds. (2009). The Concise Cinegraph: Encyclopaedia of German Cinema. New York: Berghahn Books. ISBN 978-1-57181-655-9.
- Klaus, Ulrich J. Deutsche Tonfilme: Jahrgang 1936. Klaus-Archiv, 1988.
