= Werner Pledath =

German actor

- Born: 26 April 1898; Berlin, German Empire
- Died: 6 December 1965 (aged 67); West Berlin, West Germany
- Occupation: Actor
- Years active: 1923 - 1965 (film)

Werner Pledath (26 April 1898 – 6 December 1965) was a German actor who appeared in many films during a lengthy career. He generally played supporting roles such as in Five from the Jazz Band (1932). Pledath specialized in playing powerful, authority figures. Following the Second World War he appeared in several films made in East Germany.

== Selected filmography ==
- Man by the Wayside (1923)
- The Street Song (1931)
- Who Takes Love Seriously? (1931)
- Dreaming Lips (1932)
- I by Day, You by Night (1932)
- Things Are Getting Better Already (1932)
- Five from the Jazz Band (1932)
- The Invisible Front (1932)
- Scandal in Budapest (1933)
- Today Is the Day (1933)
- Mother and Child (1934)
- The Higher Command (1935)
- The Valiant Navigator (1935)
- Pygmalion (1935)
- The Saint and Her Fool (1935)
- Port Arthur (1936)
- Savoy Hotel 217 (1936)
- Victoria in Dover (1936)
- White Slaves (1937)
- An Enemy of the People (1937)
- Dangerous Crossing (1937)
- Mother Song (1937)
- The Chief Witness (1937)
- Triad (1938)
- Red Orchids (1938)
- The Day After the Divorce (1938)
- The Night of Decision (1938)
- The Muzzle (1938)
- By a Silken Thread (1938)
- A Prussian Love Story (1938)
- Escape in the Dark (1939)
- Police Report (1939)
- In the Name of the People (1939)
- Robert Koch (1939)
- A Hopeless Case (1939)
- The Governor (1939)
- Our Miss Doctor (1940)
- The Three Codonas (1940)
- Diesel (1942)
- Between Heaven and Earth (1942)
- Circus Renz (1943)
- The Golden Spider (1943)
- Laugh Bajazzo (1943)
- The Degenhardts (1944)
- Harald Arrives at Nine (1944)
- Street Acquaintances (1948)
- Thank You, I'm Fine (1948)
- The Blue Swords (1949)
- The Appeal to Conscience (1949)
- The Benthin Family (1950)
- The Last Year (1951)
- The Condemned Village (1952)
- Anna Susanna (1953)
- Ernst Thälmann (1954)

== Bibliography ==
- Youngkin, Stephen. The Lost One: A Life of Peter Lorre. University Press of Kentucky, 2005.
