= Journey to Happiness =

1948 film

- Directed by: Erich Engel
- Written by: Thea von Harbou
- Produced by: Walter Bolz
- Starring: Käthe Dorsch; Rudolf Forster; Hildegard Knef
- Cinematography: Franz Weihmayr
- Edited by: Walter von Bonhorst
- Music by: Bruno Balz
- Production company: UFA
- Distributed by: Sovexport Film
- Release date: 6 August 1948
- Running time: 88 minutes
- Country: Germany
- Language: German

Journey to Happiness (German: Fahrt ins Glück) is a 1948 German romantic drama film directed by Erich Engel and starring Käthe Dorsch, Rudolf Forster and Hildegard Knef. It was made at the Babelsberg Studios in Berlin while location shooting took place around the Attersee (lake) in Austria.The film's sets were designed by the art director Erich Kettelhut. It was one of a significant number of films produced during Nazi Germany but not released until after the fall of the Nazi regime. It was originally made in 1944 during the Second World War, but its release was delayed by four years before it eventually premiered in the Soviet Zone.

== Cast ==
- Käthe Dorsch as Celia Loevengaard
- Rudolf Forster as Konsul Hoyermann
- Hildegard Knef as Susanne Loevengaard
- Werner Fuetterer as Richard Jürgens
- Hedwig Wangel as Großmutter Loevengaard
- Ruth Nimbach as Lisette, Hausmädchen
- Max Eckard as Fred, Artist
- Gustav Knuth as Holm, Antiquitätenhändler
- Erich Fiedler as Varietebesucher
- Hans Stiebner as Varietebesucher
- Karl Hannemann as Gläubiger bei Loevengaards
- Heinrich Troxbömker as Gläubiger bei Loevengaards
- Helmuth Helsig as Schlafwagenschaffner
- Victor Janson as Varietiedirektor
- Maria Loja as Artist
- Hellmuth Passarge as Chauffeur

== Bibliography ==
- Rentschler, Eric. The Ministry of Illusion: Nazi Cinema and Its Afterlife. Harvard University Press, 1996.
- Trimborn, Jürgen. Hildegard Knef: das Glück kennt nur Minuten : die Biographie. Deutsche Verlags-Anstalt, 2005.
