= Hans Richter (actor) =

German actor

- In Die Feuerzangenbowle (1944)
- Born: 12 January 1919; Brandenburg, Germany
- Died: 5 October 2008 (aged 89); Heppenheim, Germany
- Occupation: Actor
- Years active: 1931–1992
- Spouse: Ingeborg Bieber (1945–2008; his death)
- Children: 2

Hans Richter (12 January 1919 – 5 October 2008) was a German film actor. He appeared in more than 130 films between 1931 and 1984, mostly in supporting roles. He was born in Brandenburg, Germany and died in Heppenheim, Germany.

== Life and career ==
Hans Richter made his film debut as "Fliegender Hirsch" in Gerhard Lamprecht's Emil and the Detectives (1931), based on the novel of the same name by Erich Kästner. In the following years, Richter become a popular juvenile actor; often playing clever, somewhat cheeky boys (a type similar to Mickey Rooney in the American film during the 1930s). When he reached legal age, he had appeared in over 50 films. After his supporting role as a lazy schoolboy in Die Feuerzangenbowle (1944), Richter got drafted into the German Wehrmacht and was also in war imprisonment for some time.

After the World War, Richter worked as a cabaret artist and also appeared in numerous of the popular Heimatfilms, among them The Black Forest Girl (1950) and The Heath Is Green (1951). He also worked as a film director on two films during the 1950s: Vatertag and Hurrah – Die Firma hat ein Kind, both released in 1955. Since the late 1950s, Richter moved more and more to theatre work, making only sparsely film and television appearances during his later years. He appeared at the Deutsches Schauspielhaus and the Opern- und Schauspielhaus Frankfurt. In 1974, he founded the Festspiele Heppenheim, a summer theatre, in which he worked as an actor/director/producer until his retirement in the 1990s.

== Personal life ==
Hans Richter was married to his wife Ingeborg Bieber for 63 years until his death, aged 89. They had two children. He was awarded the Order of Merit of the Federal Republic of Germany in 1983.

== Selected filmography ==
- Emil and the Detectives (1931) - Fliegender Hirsch
- The Night Without Pause (1931) - Piccolo
- The Blue of Heaven (1932) - Tommy
- The Burning Secret (1933) - Fritz, Page
- Manolescu, Prince of Thieves (1933)
- Hände aus dem Dunkel (1933) - Fritz, Laufbursche
- Love Must Be Understood (1933) - Hotel-Page (uncredited)
- A Trip to the Country (1933) - Max
- S.O.S. Eisberg (1933) - Amateurfunker (uncredited)
- Hitlerjunge Quex (1933) - Franz
- Three Bluejackets and a Blonde (1933) - Fritz, Ilses Bruder
- The Tsarevich (1933)
- The Page from the Dalmasse Hotel (1933) - Der Page Ottokar
- Keine Angst vor Liebe (1933) - Fritz
- A Precocious Girl (1934) - Kurt - ein 14jähriger Junge
- The Black Whale (1934) - Ein Heizerjunge
- Adventure on the Southern Express (1934) - Max, Pikkolo im Speisewagen
- The Flower Girl from the Grand Hotel (1934) - Tommy, ein Straßenjunge
- Liebe dumme Mama (1934) - Der Junge
- Spring Parade (1934) - Lehrling Fritzi (uncredited)
- Abenteuer eines jungen Herrn in Polen (1934) - Fritz, sein Sohn
- The English Marriage (1934) - Tuck Mavis
- Peter (1934) - Hobby, apprentice
- Peter, Paul and Nanette (1935) - Fritz
- Wenn ein Mädel Hochzeit macht (1935) - Ludwig, ihr Bruder
- Knockout (1935) - Page
- Fresh Wind from Canada (1935) - Josef, Hilfsbeleuchter
- Großreinemachen (1935) - Tommy
- Ein ganzer Kerl (1935) - Otto, ein Lehrling
- Pygmalion (1935) - Jonny
- Ein Walzer um den Stephansturm (1935) - Fritz
- Königstiger (1935) - Hans
- The Dreamer (1936) - Graf Franz von Mettke, Gymnasiast
- Soldier Comrades (1936) - Kurt - sein Sohn
- Hilde Petersen postlagernd (1936) - Hans, der Page
- Der verkannte Lebemann (1936) - Ein Boy
- Inkognito (1936) - Lehrling Ewald Panse
- A Hoax (1936) - Manz, Liftboy 'Hotel Kronprinz'
- Uncle Bräsig (1936) - Triddelfitz, Volontär
- Das Frauenparadies (1936) - Fritz, Laufbursche
- The Girl Irene (1936) - Philip
- The Violet of Potsdamer Platz (1936) - Fritz
- The Court Concert (1936) - Gefreiter der Grenzwache Veit
- Der lustige Witwenball (1936)
- Eine Nacht mit Hindernissen (1937) - Peter Mitscherling
- Vor Liebe wird gewarnt (1937) - Alex Palme, Sohn
- The Man Who Was Sherlock Holmes (1937) - A clever boy from Berlin (uncredited)
- Fremdenheim Filoda (1937) - Tom - Führer der 'Singing Boys'
- An Enemy of the People (1937) - Walter Stockmann
- Das große Abenteuer (1938) - Zeitungsjunge
- Mit versiegelter Order (1938) - Dagor Khan - sein Bruder
- Storms in May (1938) - Hein Andresen
- The Night of Decision (1938) - Pedro
- Drei wunderschöne Tage (1939)
- New Year's Eve on Alexanderplatz (1939) - Klingenberg
- A Hopeless Case (1939) - Student (uncredited)
- In letzter Minute (1939) - Peter Pelle
- Der letzte Appell (1939)
- The Fox of Glenarvon (1940) - Robin Cavendish
- Ein Leben lang (1940) - Notar
- Herz - modern möbliert (1940) - Regissør
- Our Miss Doctor (1940) - Heinz Müller, Primaner
- 5 June (1942) - Norbert Nauke
- A Salzburg Comedy (1943) - Detlef
- Die Jungfern vom Bischofsberg (1943) - Otto Kranz
- Die Gattin (1943)
- Die Feuerzangenbowle (1944) - Rosen
- Young Hearts (1944)
- Altes Herz geht auf die Reise (1947) - Philipp
- Arlberg-Express (1948)
- Blocked Signals (1948) - Sein Assistent
- The Last Night (1949) - Willem, Ordonnanz
- I'll Never Forget That Night (1949) - Dick Jaefferson
- Nothing But Coincidence (1949) - Emil Patzenberger
- Artists' Blood (1949) - Antonio - Artist & Anton Lammbein
- Doktor Rosin (1949) - Professor Moeller
- Kätchen für alles (1949) - Herbert John
- By a Nose (1949) - Sperling, Rennbahnbesucher
- Unknown Sender (1950) - Dr. Alfred Braun
- Blondes for Export (1950) - Artist Freddie
- The Black Forest Girl (1950) - Theo Patzke
- No Sin on the Alpine Pastures (1950) - Paul Wittke, Fotoreporter
- You Have to be Beautiful (1951) - Walter Schippe
- Stips (1951) - Albert Pollmann, Friseuer
- Durch dick und dünn (1951) - Schindler
- Johannes und die 13 Schönheitsköniginnen (1951) - Johannes Klettke, genannt Jonny
- Dance Into Happiness (1951) - Antonio Vicente
- The Heath Is Green (1951) - Hannes
- In München steht ein Hofbräuhaus (1951) - Hermann Busch
- Season in Salzburg (1952) - Werner Mack
- Knall and Fall as Imposters (1952) - Knall
- 1. April 2000 (1952) - Reporter
- At the Well in Front of the Gate (1952) - Hans, Landstreicher
- Cuba Cabana (1952) - Billy
- The Rose of Stamboul (1953) - Fridolin Müller jun.
- Knall and Fall as Detectives (1953) - Knall
- Red Roses, Red Lips, Red Wine (1953) - Alfred Berg
- The Cousin from Nowhere (1953) - August Kuhbrot
- Girl with a Future (1954) - Peter
- Clivia (1954)
- König der Manege (1954) - Heinz
- The Little Czar (1954) - Boris
- The Spanish Fly (1955) - Dr. Gerlach
- Stopover in Orly (1955) - Fred (uncredited)
- Love Is Just a Fairytale (1955) - Fritz Keller
- Father's Day (1955)
- Wilhelm Tell (1956) - Struth von Winkelried
- Black Forest Melody (1956) - Aribert
- Holiday am Wörthersee (1956) - Eduard, Chauffeur
- Das Donkosakenlied (1956) - Karl, Chauffeur
- Frauen sind für die Liebe da (1957) - Peter Bock
- Zwei Herzen voller Seligkeit (1957) - Franz, Chauffeur
- The Heart of St. Pauli (1957) - Moses, Kellner bei Jonny
- Wenn die Bombe platzt (1958) - Schnecke
- The Muzzle (1958) - Maler Ali
- The Blue Moth (1959) - Regisseur Olten
- Dream Revue (1959) - Ferdy Nuschler, Pressefotograf
- When the Heath Is in Bloom (1960) - Musician Peter
- The Young Sinner (1960) - Müller
- The Haunted Castle (1960) - Jockel
- Ach Egon! (1961) - Behnke
- Davon träumen alle Mädchen (1961) - Referent Mayer
- Beloved Impostor (1961) - Steward Pfister
- Drei Liebesbriefe aus Tirol (1962) - Peter Zwanziger
- Dance with Me Into the Morning (1962) - Privatdetektiv Egon Blume
- His Best Friend (1962) - Max
- Don't Fool with Me (1963) - Gag-Man Klaus Fuchs
- Our Crazy Nieces (1963) - Dr. Heribert Wippel
- The Black Cobra (1963) - Inspektor Knecht
- Glorious Times at the Spessart Inn (1967) - Toni
- Die Feuerzangenbowle (1970) - Dr. Brett
- Section spéciale (1975) - Le général Otto von Stülpnagel, le gouverneur militaire de Paris
- Neues vom Räuber Hotzenplotz (1979) - Bürgermeister
- At the Beginning of Glorious Days (1980)
- Deutschland-Tournee (1984, TV Movie) - Robert

== Bibliography ==
- John Holmstrom, The Moving Picture Boy: An International Encyclopaedia from 1895 to 1995, Norwich, Michael Russell, 1996, p. 90.
