= Nanette (film) =

1940 film

- Directed by: Erich Engel
- Written by: Jochen Huth
- Produced by: Eberhard Klagemann
- Starring: Jenny Jugo; Hans Söhnker; Albrecht Schoenhals
- Cinematography: Reimar Kuntze
- Edited by: Walter von Bonhorst
- Music by: Peter Kreuder
- Production company: Klagemann-Film
- Distributed by: Deutsche Filmexport
- Release date: 23 January 1940
- Running time: 97 minutes
- Country: Germany
- Language: German

Nanette is a 1940 German musical film directed by Erich Engel and starring Jenny Jugo, Hans Söhnker and Albrecht Schoenhals.

The film's sets were designed by the art directors Karl Haacker and Karl Weber.

== Cast ==
- Jenny Jugo as Nanette Dürwaldt
- Hans Söhnker as Alexander Patou
- Albrecht Schoenhals as Georg Miller
- Olga Limburg as Frau Klose
- Hans Schwarz Jr. as Gustav
- Flockina von Platen as Schauspielerin
- Siegfried Breuer as 1. Schauspieler
- Hans Stiebner as Julius, Wirt
- Anton Pointner as 2. Schauspieler
- Karl Hannemann as Bühnenportier
- Dolly Raphael as Kassiererin
- Annemarie Korff as Sekretärin
- Günther Markert as Sekretär
- Emmy Wyda as Ältere Dame
- Henry Lorenzen as Inspizient
- Heinrich Troxbömker as Polizeirichter
- Viktor Carter as Junger Mann

== Bibliography ==
- Bock, Hans-Michael & Bergfelder, Tim. The Concise CineGraph. Encyclopedia of German Cinema. Berghahn Books, 2009.
