= Three Bluejackets, One Blonde Girl =

- German film poster
- German: Drei blaue Jungs, ein blondes Mädel
- Directed by: Carl Boese
- Written by: Marie Luise Droop
- Produced by: Carl Boese
- Starring: Charlotte Ander; Heinz Rühmann; Friedrich Benfer
- Cinematography: Franz Koch
- Edited by: Putty Krafft
- Music by: Eduard Künneke
- Production company: Carl Boese-Film
- Distributed by: Metropol-Film
- Release date: 2 October 1933
- Running time: 88 minutes
- Country: Germany
- Language: German

Three Bluejackets, One Blonde Girl (German: Drei blaue Jungs, ein blondes Mädel) is a 1933 German comedy film directed by Carl Boese and starring Charlotte Ander, Heinz Rühmann and Friedrich Benfer. It was shot at the Babelsberg Studios in Berlin. The film's sets were designed by the art director Karl Machus.

== Cast ==
- Charlotte Ander as Ilse Schröder
- Heinz Rühmann as Cadet Heini Jäger
- Friedrich Benfer as Willy Thiem
- Fritz Kampers as Heini's Butenschön
- Hans Richter as Fritz, Ilse's brother
- Sophie Pagay as Heini's mother
- Gerhard Dammann
- Karl Hannemann
- Hans Hemes
- Hans Albin
- Adolf Fischer
- Karl Klöckner

== Bibliography ==
- Klaus, Ulrich J. Deutsche Tonfilme: Jahrgang 1933. Klaus-Archiv, 1988.
