= Willi Schur =

German actor and singer (1888–1940)

- Born: 22 August 1888; Breslau, Silesia; German Empire
- Died: 1 November 1940 (aged 52); Teltow, Brandenburg; Nazi Germany
- Occupation(s): Film actor, singer

Willi Schur (22 August 1888 – 1 November 1940) was a German actor and singer. He appeared in roughly ninety feature films in a variety of supporting roles.

== Selected filmography ==
- Berlin-Alexanderplatz (1931)
- Who Takes Love Seriously? (1931)
- The Captain from Köpenick (1931)
- All is at Stake (1932)
- Dreaming Lips (1932)
- Sacred Waters (1932)
- Gypsies of the Night (1932)
- The Victor (1932)
- The Invisible Front (1932)
- A Tremendously Rich Man (1932)
- Five from the Jazz Band (1932)
- The Racokzi March (1933)
- A City Upside Down (1933)
- The House of Dora Green (1933)
- The Star of Valencia (1933)
- Gold (1934)
- My Heart Calls You (1934)
- Police Report (1934)
- The Grand Duke's Finances (1934)
- Hard Luck Mary (1934)
- Music in the Blood (1934)
- The Double (1934)
- Miss Liselott (1934)
- Trouble with Jolanthe (1934)
- Master of the World (1934)
- Don't Lose Heart, Suzanne! (1935)
- Blood Brothers (1935)
- Everything for a Woman (1935)
- Ave Maria (1936)
- The Impossible Woman (1936)
- The Court Concert (1936)
- Stadt Anatol (1936)
- Under Blazing Heavens (1936)
- The Mysterious Mister X (1936)
- White Slaves (1937)
- Pat und Patachon im Paradies (1937)
- His Best Friend (1937)
- The Irresistible Man (1937)
- The Man Who Was Sherlock Holmes (1937)
- The Woman at the Crossroads (1938)
- By a Silken Thread (1938)
- Men, Animals and Sensations (1938)
- Dance on the Volcano (1938)
- Storms in May (1938)
- The Impossible Mister Pitt (1938)
- Secret Code LB 17 (1938)
- Napoleon Is to Blame for Everything (1938)
- Madame Butterfly (1939)
- Stars of Variety (1939)
- Mistake of the Heart (1939)
- Between River and Steppe (1939)
- Robert and Bertram (1939)
- Marriage in Small Doses (1939)
- Congo Express (1939)
- Twilight (1940)

== Bibliography ==
- O'Brien, Mary-Elizabeth. Nazi Cinema as Enchantment: The Politics of Entertainment in the Third Reich. Camden House, 2006.
