= City of Anatol =

1936 film directed by Viktor Tourjansky

- Directed by: Viktor Tourjansky
- Written by: Peter Francke; Walter Supper
- Based on: City of Anatol by Bernhard Kellermann
- Produced by: Alfred Greven
- Starring: Gustav Fröhlich; Brigitte Horney; Fritz Kampers; Rose Stradner
- Cinematography: Karl Puth
- Edited by: Eduard von Borsody
- Music by: Walter Gronostay
- Production company: UFA
- Distributed by: UFA
- Release date: 16 October 1936
- Running time: 93 minutes
- Country: Germany
- Language: German

City of Anatol (German: Stadt Anatol) is a 1936 German drama film directed by Viktor Tourjansky and starring Gustav Fröhlich, Brigitte Horney and Fritz Kampers. It is based on a 1932 novel City of Anatol by Bernhard Kellermann. The film is set in a small city in the Balkans, where the discovery of oil leads to a major boom. It was shot at the Babelsberg Studios in Berlin with sets designed by the art directors Otto Hunte and Willy Schiller. A separate French language version, Wells in Flames (Puits en flames), was made, also directed by Tourjansky but featuring a different cast.

== Cast ==
- Gustav Fröhlich as Jacques Gregor
- Brigitte Horney as Franziska Maniu
- Fritz Kampers as Jaskulski
- Rose Stradner as Sonja Yvolandi
- Karl Hellmer as Xaver, Kellner
- Harry Liedtke as Garcia, Genraldirektor
- Aribert Wäscher as Melonenhändler
- Olga Engl as Sonjas Großmutter
- Ernst Behmer as ein Betrunkener
- Gerhard Bienert as Arbeiter bei Ölbohrungen
- Paul Bildt as Arbeiter Stefan
- Josef Dahmen as Arbeiter bei Gregor
- Marina von Ditmar as Rosa, eine Tänzerin
- Else Ehser as Rosas Großmutter
- Angelo Ferrari as Stefan
- Hela Gruel as Stefans Frau
- Philipp Manning as Freund von Sonjas Großmutter
- Else Reval as Frau des Melonenhändlers
- Hilde Sessak as Franziskas Dienstmädchen
- Ernst G. Schiffner as Koroschek, Hotelier
- Willi Schur as Türkischer Lorenfahrer
- Otto Stoeckel as Ledermann, ein Ölexperte
- Gertrud Wolle as Jaskulskis Schwester
- Valy Arnheim as Garcias Fahrer
- Aruth Wartan as Arbeiter
- Erich Dunskus as Baumeister im Steinbruch

== Bibliography ==
- Hake, Sabine. Popular Cinema of the Third Reich. University of Texas Press, 2010.
- Kreimeier, Klaus. The Ufa Story: A History of Germany's Greatest Film Company, 1918–1945. University of California Press, 1999.
