= Royal Children =

1950 film directed by Helmut Käutner

- Princess Ulrike (Jenny Jugo) holds court.
- Directed by: Helmut Käutner
- Written by: Emil Burri; Herbert Witt; Helmut Käutner
- Produced by: Eberhard Klagemann
- Starring: Jenny Jugo; Peter van Eyck; Hedwig Wangel
- Cinematography: Reimar Kuntze
- Edited by: Wolfgang Wehrum
- Music by: Bernhard Eichhorn
- Production companies: Bavaria Film; Klagemann-Film
- Distributed by: Schorcht Filmverleih; Sascha Film (Austria)
- Release date: 20 January 1950
- Running time: 95 minutes
- Country: West Germany
- Language: German

Royal Children (German: Königskinder) is a 1950 West German comedy film directed by Helmut Käutner and starring Jenny Jugo, Peter van Eyck and Hedwig Wangel. It was shot at the Bavaria Studios in Munich and on location in Bad Wimpfen and at Hornberg Castle. The film's sets were designed by the art director Bruno Monden and Hermann Warm. It was a major commercial failure on release.

== Synopsis ==
At the end of the Second World War, part of the traditional royal family are forced to flee from their historic lands. They still possess a castle in Bavaria. After a difficult journey to reach it they find that the castle is in ruins. Gradually they try to rebuild their lives in their new home and adjust to the challenges of modern life.

== Cast ==
- Jenny Jugo as Prinzessin Ulrike von Brandenburg
- Peter van Eyck as Paul König
- Hedwig Wangel as Frau von Bockh, Oberhofmeisterin
- Erika von Thellmann as Yella von Beuthel, Hofdame der Prinzessin
- Thea Thiele as Felizitas, Herzogin von Lauenstein
- Friedrich Schoenfelder as Prinz Alexander 'Sascha' von Thessalien
- Walter Kottenkamp as Achilles, Prinz von Brandenburg, Onkel von Ulrike
- Theodor Danegger as Hubertus, Herzog von Lauenstein
- Georg Vogelsang as Daun
- Rudolf Schündler as Tintsch
- Charles Regnier as Graf Larissa
- Beppo Brem as Landrat
- Wastl Witt as Forstmeister
- Bob Norwood
- Gertrud Wolle as Lehrerin
- Barbara Gallauner as Sekretärin
- Beppo Schwaiger as Karl
- Marion Kässl
- Helmut Käutner as German policeman
- Franz Loskarn

== Bibliography ==
- Hans-Michael Bock and Tim Bergfelder. The Concise Cinegraph: An Encyclopedia of German Cinema. Berghahn Books.
- Davidson, John & Hake, Sabine. Framing the Fifties: Cinema in a Divided Germany. Berghahn Books, 2007.
