= Hans-Otto Borgmann =

German composer (1901–1977)

- Born: Hans-Otto Borgmann; 20 October 1901; Linden, German Empire
- Died: 26 July 1977 (aged 75); West Berlin, West Germany
- Occupations: Film director, screenwriter, film producer, actor
- Years active: 1928–1977

Hans-Otto Borgmann (20 October 1901 – 26 July 1977) was a German film music composer during the Third Reich.

He joined UFA as a silent film music conductor in 1928, and became head composer by 1931. A melody he had composed for a documentary on Svalbard island and had become well known was taken up by Hitler Youth leader Baldur von Schirach who wrote new lyrics as "Our flag flutters before us", becoming one of the Hitler Youth's anthems.

In 1938 he composed a Großdeutsche Hymne for Schirach which coincided with the Anschluss of Austria.

From 1937 to 1951 he collaborated on a series of films with Veit Harlan. From 1959 to 1971 he withdrew from film popular music to lecture at the Max Reinhardt Theatre and privately compose difficult atonal music.

== Film music credits ==
- When Love Sets the Fashion (1932)
- Quick (1932)
- Man Without a Name (1932)
- Narcotics (1932)
- The Beautiful Adventure (1932)
- The White Demon (1932)
- Spoiling the Game (1932)
- You Will Be My Wife (1932)
- The Cheeky Devil (1932)
- A Door Opens (1933)
- Goodbye, Beautiful Days (1933)
- Happy Days in Aranjuez (1933)
- The Star of Valencia (1933)
- Hitler junge Quex. Ein Film vom Opfergeist der deutschen Jugend, 1933.
- Gold (1934)
- Count Woronzeff (1934)
- The Girl from the Marsh Croft (1935)
- The Foolish Virgin (1935)
- The Night With the Emperor (1936)
- Moscow-Shanghai (1936)
- The Unknown (1936)
- Victoria in Dover (1936)
- Tango Notturno (1937)
- The Journey to Tilsit (1939)
- A Hopeless Case (1939)
- Our Miss Doctor (1940)
- Jakko (1941)
- Der große König, 1942
- Diesel (1942)
- The Master of the Estate (1943)
- The Buchholz Family (1944)
- Marriage of Affection (1944)
- The Noltenius Brothers (1945)
- An Everyday Story (1948)
- The Great Mandarin (1949)
- How Do We Tell Our Children? (1949)
- Only One Night (1950)
- The Girl from the South Seas (1950)
- Hanna Amon (1951)
- The Deadly Dreams (1951)
- The Chaplain of San Lorenzo (1953)
- The Stronger Woman (1953)
- Consul Strotthoff (1954)
- Island of the Dead (1955)
- One Should Be Twenty Again (1958)

== Songs ==
- Tango notturno in the film of the same name. The role originally for Marlene Dietrich was given to Pola Negri who popularised Borgmann's song.

== Recordings ==
- Tango notturno, "Ich hab' an dich gedacht", on the album of the same name by Isabel Bayrakdarian (2007). The song is contrasted in the booklet notes by Bayrakdarian's husband and pianist Serouj Kradjian with the Youkali tango, "C'est presque au bout du monde", of Kurt Weill, a Jewish refugee from Nazi persecution at the same time.
