= Valy Arnheim =

German actor (1883–1950)

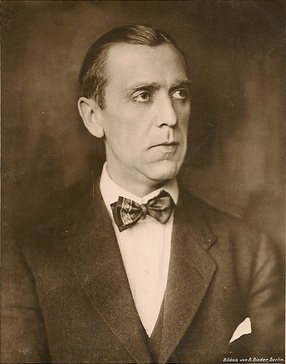
- Born: Valentin Theodor Woldemar Appel; 8 June 1883; Waldau (Bernburg), German Empire
- Died: 11 November 1950 (aged 67); Halensee, West Berlin, West Germany
- Occupation: Film actor
- Years active: 1918–1951

Valy Arnheim (born Valentin Theodor Woldemar Appel; 8 June 1883 – 11 November 1950) was a German film actor and director.

== Selected filmography ==
- Lightning Command (1921)
- Anne-Liese of Dessau (1925)
- Harry Hill's Deadly Hunt (1925)
- Volga Volga (1928)
- Girls, Beware! (1928)
- Life's Circus (1928)
- Indizienbeweis (1929)
- Spring Awakening (1929)
- Black Forest Girl (1929)
- The Hound of the Baskervilles (1929)
- The Woman Without Nerves (1930)
- Bombs on Monte Carlo (1931)
- Different Morals (1931)
- The Emperor's Sweetheart (1931)
- Circus Life (1931)
- Tannenberg (1932)
- The Private Life of Louis XIV (1935)
- His Late Excellency (1935)
- City of Anatol (1936)
- The Castle in Flanders (1936)
- Diamonds (1937)
- Men Without a Fatherland (1937)
- Rubber (1938)
- The Mystery of Betty Bonn (1938)
- Five Million Look for an Heir (1938)
- The Night With the Emperor (1936)
- My Aunt, Your Aunt (1939)
- The Governor (1939)
- The Sensational Casilla Trial (1939)
- The Three Codonas (1940)
- Andreas Schlüter (1942)
- Germanin (1943)
- Munchausen (1943)
- Wozzeck (1947)
- The Court Concert (1948)
