= Hans Stiebner =

German actor

Hans Stiebner (19 November 1898 – 27 March 1958) was a German actor.

Steibner was born in Vetschau, Germany as Hans Friedrich Wilhelm Georg Paul Stiebner. He died in 1958 in Baden-Baden, West Germany.

== Selected filmography ==
- The Grand Duke's Finances (1934)
- Holiday From Myself (1934)
- Men Without a Fatherland (1937)
- Land of Love (1937)
- The Ruler (1937)
- White Slaves (1937)
- Sergeant Berry (1938)
- The Impossible Mister Pitt (1938)
- We Danced Around the World (1939)
- Police Report (1939)
- Robert and Bertram (1939)
- A Regular Fellow (1939)
- Men Are That Way (1939)
- Alarm at Station III (1939)
- Nanette (1940)
- Counterfeiters (1940)
- The Unfaithful Eckehart (1940)
- Twilight (1940)
- The Rothschilds (1940)
- Mein Leben für Irland (1941)
- Uncle Kruger (1941)
- The Red Terror (1942)
- The Thing About Styx (1942)
- Romance in a Minor Key (1943)
- The Bath in the Barn (1943)
- The Impostor (1944)
- The Woman of My Dreams (1944)
- Somewhere in Berlin (1946)
- Thank You, I'm Fine (1948)
- Journey to Happiness (1948)
- The Appeal to Conscience (1949)
- Don't Dream, Annette (1949)
- The Great Mandarin (1949)
- The Woman from Last Night (1950)
- Dark Eyes (1951)
- Torreani (1951)
- When the Heath Dreams at Night (1952)
- Towers of Silence (1952)
- Pension Schöller (1952)
- The Day Before the Wedding (1952)
- Klettermaxe (1952)
- Weekend in Paradise (1952)
- Fight of the Tertia (1952)
- Diary of a Married Woman (1953)
- Ave Maria (1953)
- Red Roses, Red Lips, Red Wine (1953)
- Captain Wronski (1954)
- My Sister and I (1954)
- Before God and Man (1955)
- Die Ratten (1955)
- The Spanish Fly (1955)
- Doctor Crippen Lives (1958)
- Lilli (1958)
- Two Hearts in May (1958)

== Bibliography ==
- Fox, Jo. Film propaganda in Britain and Nazi Germany: World War II Cinema. Berg, 2007.
