= Who Takes Love Seriously? =

1931 film

- Directed by: Erich Engel
- Written by: Curt Alexander; Henry Koster
- Produced by: Curt Melnitz
- Starring: Max Hansen; Jenny Jugo; Otto Wallburg; Willi Schur
- Cinematography: Curt Courant
- Music by: Will Grosz; Kurt Schröder
- Production company: Terra Film
- Distributed by: Terra Film
- Release date: 28 September 1931
- Running time: 91 minutes
- Country: Germany
- Language: German

Who Takes Love Seriously? (German: Wer nimmt die Liebe ernst...) is a 1931 German romantic comedy film directed by Erich Engel and starring Max Hansen, Jenny Jugo, and Otto Wallburg. It was shot at the Marienfelde Studios of Terra Film in Berlin and on location in the city. The film's sets were designed by the art director Heinrich Richter.

== Cast ==
- Max Hansen as Max
- Jenny Jugo as Ilse
- Otto Wallburg as Speculator Bruno
- Willi Schur as Jacob
- Hedwig Wangel as Zimmervermieterin
- Hugo Fischer-Köppe
- Ernst Morgan
- Werner Pledath
- Ernst Behmer
- Frigga Braut
- Jakob Sinn
- Otti Dietze
- Arthur Mainzer
- Harry Grunwald
- Hans Ritter

== Bibliography ==
- Bock, Hans-Michael; Bergfelder, Tim, eds. (2009). The Concise Cinegraph: Encyclopaedia of German Cinema. New York: Berghahn Books. ISBN 978-1-57181-655-9.
