= The Impossible Woman (1936 film) =

1936 film

- Directed by: Johannes Meyer
- Written by: Mia Fellmann (novel); Thea von Harbou
- Starring: Dorothea Wieck; Gustav Fröhlich; Gina Falckenberg; Edwin Jürgensen
- Cinematography: Alexander von Lagorio
- Edited by: Fritz C. Mauch
- Music by: Clemens Schmalstich
- Production company: Cine-Allianz Tonfilm
- Distributed by: Europa Film
- Release date: 3 April 1936
- Running time: 89 minutes
- Country: Nazi Germany
- Language: German

The Impossible Woman (German: Die unmögliche Frau) is a 1936 German romance film directed by Johannes Meyer and starring Dorothea Wieck, Gustav Fröhlich and Gina Falckenberg. It was shot at the Johannisthal Studios in Berlin and partly on location in Romania. It was based on the novel Madame will nicht heiraten by Mia Fellmann.

== Synopsis ==
The female head of an oil company is known for her aloof manner, and is considered an "impossible woman" by her employees. Eventually, she falls in love with one of her engineers, who has rescued the company from industrial sabotage.

== Cast ==
- Dorothea Wieck as Ileana Manescu
- Gustav Fröhlich as Ingenieur Wiegand
- Gina Falckenberg as Mignon
- Edwin Jürgensen as Maravella
- Paul Henckels as Möller
- Harry Hardt as Director Kiriak
- Willi Schur as Dobre - Werkmeister
- Karl Hannemann as Roman - Bohrmeister
- Emil Höfer as Nicu
- Katja Specht as Mitza
- Wilhelm König as Ingenieur Jonescu
- Eduard Bornträger as Banu - Prokurist
- Gerhard Dammann as Ein Briefträger
- Fred Becker as Dancer
- Gertrud Weiß as Dancer
- Hugo Flink
- Adolf Gondrell
- Charlotte Hasse
- Heinrich Krill
- Max Maschek
- Kitty Meinhardt
- Günther Meyer
- Arthur Reinhardt
- Willi Rose
- Margarete Sachse
- Nico Turoff

== Bibliography ==
- Hake, Sabine (2001). Popular Cinema of the Third Reich. University of Texas Press. ISBN 978-0-292-73458-6.
