= A City Upside Down =

1933 film

- Directed by: Gustaf Gründgens
- Written by: Curt Alexander
- Based on: The Government Inspector by Nikolai Gogol
- Starring: S. Z. Sakall; Jenny Jugo; Hermann Thimig
- Cinematography: Franz Planer
- Edited by: Friedel Buckow; Viktor Gertler; Putty Krafft
- Music by: Willy Schmidt-Gentner
- Production company: Elite Tonfilm-Produktion
- Distributed by: Metropol-Filmverleih; Lux Film (Austria)
- Release date: 21 January 1933
- Running time: 80 minutes
- Country: Germany
- Language: German

A City Upside Down (German: Eine Stadt steht Kopf) is a 1933 German comedy film directed by Gustaf Gründgens and starring S.Z. Sakall, Jenny Jugo and Hermann Thimig. It is based on the 1836 play The Government Inspector by Nikolai Gogol. A separate Czech adaptation of the story The Inspector General was made the same year.

The film's sets were designed by the art directors Rochus Gliese and Gabriel Pellon. Paul Martin worked as assistant director on the film. Some location shooting took place in Staufen im Breisgau. This movie is set in the modern day (the 1930s).

== Cast ==
- S. Z. Sakall as Der Bürgermeister
- Jenny Jugo as Trude, seine Tochter
- Hermann Thimig as Heinz, ein junger Mann
- Heinrich Schroth as Revisionsrat
- Berthe Ostyn as Sein 'blondes Gift'
- Aribert Wäscher
- Lotte Stein as Frau Cruse
- Maya Bruhns as Tochter
- Fritz Kampers as Herr Güterinspektor
- Carla Bartheel as Seine Frau
- Paul Henckels as Herr Berger
- Theo Lingen as Fred, ein Sohn
- Hans Deppe as Schulrat Klein
- Arthur Mainzer as Sanitätsrat Strucker
- Herbert Paulmüller as Amtsdiener Bieber
- Friedrich Honna as Innkeeper
- Lotte Loebinger as Lehrerin
- Renate Bergk as Renate
- Laurie Lane as Sophie
- Willi Schur as Paul

== Bibliography ==
- Grange, William (2008). Cultural Chronicle of the Weimar Republic. Scarecrow Press. ISBN 978-0-8108-5967-8.
- Waldman, Harry (2008). Nazi Films in America, 1933–1942. McFarland. ISBN 978-0-7864-3861-7.
