= Dangerous Game (1937 film) =

1937 film

- Directed by: Erich Engel
- Written by: Alexander Castell (novel); Ernst Marischka
- Produced by: Eberhard Klagemann
- Starring: Jenny Jugo; Harry Liedtke; Karl Martell
- Cinematography: Bruno Mondi
- Edited by: René Métain
- Music by: Georg Haentzschel
- Production company: Klagemann-Film
- Distributed by: Rota-Film; Tobis-Sascha (Austria)
- Release date: 3 April 1937
- Running time: 91 minutes
- Country: Germany
- Language: German

Dangerous Game (German: Gefährliches Spiel) is a 1937 German comedy film directed by Erich Engel, starring Jenny Jugo, Harry Liedtke and Karl Martell.

The film's sets were designed by the art director Karl Haacker and Hermann Warm.

== Cast ==
- Jenny Jugo as Rosy von Wenden
- Harry Liedtke as Baron Carl Erich von Wenden
- Karl Martell as Dr. Helmut Boromäus
- Otto Treßler as Rosys Großvater Gustav Adolf Martini
- Theo Lingen as Paul Hoffmann
- Anton Pointner as Harry Caspari
- Will Dohm as Lawyer Dr. Richter
- Herbert Hübner as Bankier Hirt
- Renée Stobrawa as Natalie
- Erika Helmke as Walpurga
- Elsa Wagner as Martinis Haushälterin Hildegard
- Elisabeth Dischinger as Dr. Boromäus' Sekretärin
- Olga Limburg as Dr. Boromäus' Tischnachbarin
- Lotte Spira as Gastgeberin Frau Dr. Klausen
- Toni Tetzlaff as Freundin der Gastgeberin
- Gertrud Wolle as Gardrobiere im Hotelrestaurant
- Franz Arzdorf as Rosys Tischnachbar bei der Abendgesellschaft
- Ernst Behmer as Schlafwagenschaffner
- Karl Hannemann as Portier in Dr. Boromäus' Haus
- Joe Münch-Harris as Direktor der exotischen Bar
- Hildegard Fränzel as Zofe auf Gut Wenden
- Paul Hildebrandt as Gerichtsvollzieher
- Antonie Jaeckel as Freundin der Gastgeberin
- Alfred Karen as Gast der Abendgesellschaft
- Kurt Klotz-Oberland as Gerichtsvollzieher
- Dagmar Muthardt
- Elsa Möwes as Hoteltelefonistin
- Friedel Müller as Köchin auf Gut Wenden
- Georg A. Profé as Gast der Abendgesellschaft
- Michael von Newlinsky as Ober im Nachtlokal

== Bibliography ==
- Bock, Hans-Michael; Bergfelder, Tim, eds. (2009). The Concise Cinegraph: Encyclopaedia of German Cinema. New York: Berghahn Books. ISBN 978-1-57181-655-9.
