= Lightning Command =

1921 film directed by Valy Arnheim

- Directed by: Valy Arnheim
- Written by: Alf Zengerling
- Produced by: Richard Spelling
- Starring: Valy Arnheim
- Production company: Valy Arnheim-Film Richard Spelling
- Distributed by: Valy Arnheim-Film Richard Spelling
- Release date: 3 February 1921
- Country: Germany
- Languages: Silent; German intertitles

Lightning Command (German: Die Blitzzentrale) is a 1921 German silent action film directed by and starring Valy Arnheim.

== Cast ==
- Valy Arnheim as Harry Hill
- Victor Colani
- Adalbert Lenz
- Marga Lindt
- John Rappeport
- Willy Zizold

== Bibliography ==
- Grange, William. Cultural Chronicle of the Weimar Republic. Scarecrow Press, 2008.
