= The Smuggler's Bride of Mallorca =

1929 film

- Directed by: Hans Behrendt
- Written by: Victor Abel; Rudolph Cartier
- Produced by: Alfred Zeisler
- Starring: Jenny Jugo; Friedrich Benfer; Clifford McLaglen; Raimondo Van Riel
- Cinematography: Friedl Behn-Grund
- Music by: Willy Schmidt-Gentner
- Production company: UFA
- Distributed by: UFA
- Release date: 31 July 1929
- Running time: 86 minutes
- Country: Germany
- Languages: Silent; German intertitles

The Smuggler's Bride of Mallorca (German: Die Schmugglerbraut von Mallorca) is a 1929 German silent romance film directed by Hans Behrendt and starring Jenny Jugo, Friedrich Benfer and Clifford McLaglen. It was shot at the Babelsberg Studios in Berlin. It premiered in the city's UFA-Palast am Zoo.

== Cast ==
- Jenny Jugo as Rosita
- Friedrich Benfer as Pedro, Fischer
- Clifford McLaglen as Andrea, Fischer
- Raimondo Van Riel as Tolomeo
- Félix de Pomés as Polizeileutnant de Roya
- Jutta Jol as Manuela
- Mikhail Rasumny as Taschendieb Cambero
- Hans Sternberg as Wirt vom 'Schwarzen Skorpion'

== Bibliography ==
- Bergfelder, Tim; Bock, Hans-Michael (2009). The Concise Cinegraph: Encyclopedia of German Cinema. New York: Berghahn Books. ISBN 9781571816559. OCLC 426147397.
