= Hearts Are Trumps (1934 film) =

1934 film directed by Carl Boese

Hearts are Trumps
- Directed by: Carl Boese
- Written by: Eduard Andrés; Harald G. Petersson (novel); Walter Wassermann
- Produced by: Eberhard Klagemann
- Starring: Jenny Jugo; Paul Hörbiger; Friedrich Benfer
- Cinematography: Willy Winterstein
- Edited by: Hermann Haller
- Music by: Carl von Bazant
- Production company: Klagemann-Film
- Release date: 31 December 1934
- Country: Germany
- Language: German

Hearts are Trumps or Love All (German: Herz ist Trumpf) is a 1934 German comedy film directed by Carl Boese and starring Jenny Jugo, Paul Hörbiger, and Friedrich Benfer.

The film's art direction was by Alfred Bütow and Erich Czerwonski.

== Plot ==
Toni, the daughter of a rich hotel owner, is looking for a man who does not just want her for her money. One day her father sails his yacht on an inspection trip south and takes Toni with him. Dressed as a cabin boy, she meets young Bert Reno, who also owns a hotel and a small inn on the coast. When she meets him again on land in women's clothing, she claims to be the sister of cabin boy Anton. Toni is hired as a waitress at Bert Reno's hotel, hoping to learn if he is a good husband-to-be. Things get complicated when Mrs. Neubauer, a childhood sweetheart of Toni's father, arrives. Coincidentally, he sees his daughter Toni again when they meet in Bert Reno's hotel. Paulsen quickly understands that she is working here incognito and does not blow her cover.

Paulsen even goes so far as to be particularly critical of his daughter: he doesn't like anything that Bert Reno's new employee does. In these situations, Paulsen is gratified to see her boss sticking up for his new employee, hoping that this fellow hotel owner could finally be a husband for his daughter. Meanwhile, Bert doesn't want to lose contact with Toni's apparent brother, cabin boy Anton. For Toni, this means continuing the strenuous game of hide-and-seek that involves all sorts of disguises. If she has to play Anton now and again for Bert, she at least wants to use this role to warm him up more to Anton's supposed sister Toni. When Toni makes a terrible mistake as a hotel employee, Bert feels compelled to fire her. But he quickly realizes how much he misses the young woman. Bert finds out that Toni is Paulsen's daughter and rushes to the yacht on the quay to speak to Anton. Toni, who has just arrived there herself, is in the process of changing her attire when Bert bursts in. Only now does he realize that Anton and Toni are one and the same person. They fall into each other's arms.

== Cast ==
- Jenny Jugo as Toni
- Paul Hörbiger as Paulsen
- Friedrich Benfer as Bert Reno
- Käthe Haack as Frau Neubauer
- Horst Birr as Peter, Schiffsjunge
- Vicky Werckmeister as Sängerin in der Trattoria
- Günther Lüders as Jonny Adriani
- Walter Gross as Hans-Joachim Müller
- Albert Florath as Der Steuermann
- Karl Platen as Ein Diener
- Lucie Euler
- Emmy Wyda
- Rudolf Essek
- Karl Falkenberg
- Kurt Getke
- Karl Morvilius
- Bruno Ziener
- Die Fünf Parodisters

== Bibliography ==
- Bock, Hans-Michael; Bergfelder, Tim, eds. (2009). The Concise Cinegraph: Encyclopaedia of German Cinema. New York: Berghahn Books. ISBN 978-1-57181-655-9.
