= Hans Behrendt =

German-Jewish actor, screenwriter and film director

- Born: 28 September 1889; Berlin, German Empire
- Died: 1942 (aged 52–53); Auschwitz-Birkenau, German-occupied Poland
- Occupations: Film director Screenwriter; Actor
- Years active: 1920–1936

Hans Behrendt (28 September 1889 – 1942) was a German-Jewish actor, screenwriter and film director. He was murdered by the Nazis in Auschwitz concentration camp in 1942.

== Selected filmography ==
=== Screenwriter ===
- Catherine the Great (1920)
- Christian Wahnschaffe (1920)
- The Island of the Lost (1921)
- The Poisoned Stream (1921)
- Fridericus Rex (1922)
- Fräulein Raffke (1923)
- The Most Beautiful Woman in the World (1924)
- Wood Love (1925)
- Athletes (1925)
- Curfew (1925)
- The Doll of Luna Park (1925)
- The Woman with That Certain Something (1925)
- Women You Rarely Greet (1925)
- The Mill at Sanssouci (1926)
- The Violet Eater (1926)
- Die Puppe vom Lunapark (1926)
- Our Daily Bread (1926)
- My Friend the Chauffeur (1926)
- Potsdam (1927)
- The Dancer of Sanssouci (1932)

=== Director ===
- Old Heidelberg (1923)
- The New Land (1924)
- Prinz Louis Ferdinand (1927)
- Potsdam (1927)
- The Trousers (1927)
- Dyckerpotts' Heirs (1928)
- Daughter of the Regiment (1929)
- The Smuggler's Bride of Mallorca (1929)
- The League of Three (1929)
- Kohlhiesel's Daughters (1930)
- Gloria (1931, French)
- Gloria (1931, German)
- The Office Manager (1931)
- Danton (1931)
- I Go Out and You Stay Here (1931)
- The Heath Is Green (1932)
- My Friend the Millionaire (1932)
- Wedding at Lake Wolfgang (1933)
- Must We Get Divorced? (1933)
- Doña Francisquita, Ibérica Films, SA. Barcelona (1934)
- Fräulein Lilli (1936)

=== Actor ===
- Mary Magdalene (1920)
- The Island of the Lost (1921)
- A Day on Mars (1921)
- Wood Love (1925)
- The Violet Eater (1926)
