= Gustav Waldau =

German actor (1871–1958)

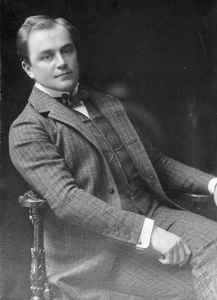
- from 1898
- Born: 27 February 1871; Ergolding, German Empire
- Died: 25 May 1958 (aged 87); Munich, West Germany
- Occupation: Actor
- Years active: 1915–1955

Gustav Waldau (27 February 1871 – 25 May 1958) was a German actor. He appeared in more than 100 films between 1915 and 1955.

== Selected filmography ==
- The Gentleman Without a Residence (1915)
- In Thrall to the Claw (1921)
- The Wrong Husband (1931)
- A Man with Heart (1932)
- A Mad Idea (1932)
- Season in Cairo (1933)
- Young Dessau's Great Love (1933)
- Little Dorrit (1934)
- Just Once a Great Lady (1934)
- So Ended a Great Love (1934)
- Farewell Waltz (1934)
- Winter Night's Dream (1935)
- Lessons in Love (1935)
- A Night on the Danube (1935)
- She and the Three (1935)
- The Three Around Christine (1936)
- Victoria in Dover (1936)
- Such Great Foolishness (1937)
- The Chief Witness (1937)
- The Voice of the Heart (1937)
- The Great and the Little Love (1938)
- Frau Sixta (1938)
- Three Wonderful Days (1939)
- A Hopeless Case (1939)
- Gold in New Frisco (1939)
- The Girl from Barnhelm (1940)
- Falstaff in Vienna (1940)
- A Man Astray (1940)
- The Vulture Wally (1940)
- Our Miss Doctor (1940)
- Operetta (1940)
- The Waitress Anna (1941)
- Secret File W.B.1 (1942)
- The Little Residence (1942)
- Between Heaven and Earth (1942)
- Beloved World (1942)
- The Second Shot (1943)
- The Endless Road (1943)
- Carnival of Love (1943)
- Laugh Bajazzo (1943)
- Late Love (1943)
- Come Back to Me (1944)
- Fregola (1948)
- The Angel with the Trumpet (1948)
- The Other Life (1948)
- Eroica (1949)
- Eine große Liebe (1949)
- Dear Friend (1949)
- Don't Dream, Annette (1949)
- Two Times Lotte (1950)
- Who Is This That I Love? (1950)
- Regimental Music (1950)
- King for One Night (1950)
- Dr. Holl (1951)
- Immortal Light (1951)
- Monks, Girls and Hungarian Soldiers (1952)
- Two People (1952)
- The Night Without Morals (1953)
- Your Heart Is My Homeland (1953)
- Marriage Strike (1953)
- The Silent Angel (1954)
- Hubertus Castle (1954)
