= Victoria in Dover (1936 film) =

1936 film

- Directed by: Erich Engel
- Written by: Geza Silberer (play); Ernst Marischka
- Produced by: Eberhard Klagemann
- Starring: Jenny Jugo; Olga Limburg; Renée Stobrawa; Otto Treßler
- Cinematography: Bruno Mondi
- Edited by: Carl Otto Bartning
- Music by: Hans-Otto Borgmann
- Production company: Klagemann-Film
- Distributed by: Tobis-Sascha Film (Austria)
- Release date: 28 February 1936
- Running time: 96 minutes
- Country: Nazi Germany
- Language: German

Victoria in Dover (German title: Mädchenjahre einer Königin) is a 1936 German romantic comedy film directed by Erich Engel and starring Jenny Jugo, Olga Limburg and Renée Stobrawa. It is based on a play by Geza Silberer. It was shot at the Babelsberg Studios in Potsdam and the Tempelhof Studios in Berlin and premiered at the city's Gloria-Palast. The film was remade in 1954 in Austria with Romy Schneider.

== Synopsis ==
After her prime minister Lord Melbourne arranges a marriage for her with the German Prince Albert, the young Queen Victoria decides to leave London and spend some time in Kent. While there she meets a handsome young German and falls in love, unaware that he is her intended husband Albert.

== Cast ==
- Jenny Jugo as Queen Victoria
- Olga Limburg as Duchess of Kent
- Renée Stobrawa as Baroness Lehzen
- Otto Treßler as Lord Melbourne
- Friedrich Benfer as Prince Albert
- Ernst G. Schiffner as King William IV of the United Kingdom
- Erik Ode as the Prince of Orange
- Angelo Ferrari as Grand Duke Alexander of Russia
- Paul Henckels as King Leopold I of Belgium
- Werner Pledath as Lord Cunningham
- Ernst Rotmund as Baron Brunow, Russian ambassador
- Julius Brandt as the Archbishop of Canterbury
- Herbert Hübner as Sir John Conroy
- Fritz Nygrin as Taglione, a dancing master
- Gustav Waldau as Professor Lenkmann
- Heinz Salfner as George, a footman
- Rudolf Essek as Lord Palmerston
- Gabriele Hoffmann as Lady Landsdowne
- Elfriede John as Lady Littelton
- Lotte Spira as Lady Flora Hastings
- Ernst Stimmel as Mr. Davis
- Otto Stoeckel as Lord Russell

== Bibliography ==
- Fritsche, Maria. Homemade Men in Postwar Austrian Cinema: Nationhood, Genre and Masculinity. Berghahn Books, 2013.
