= Alfred Zeisler =

German film producer (1892–1985)

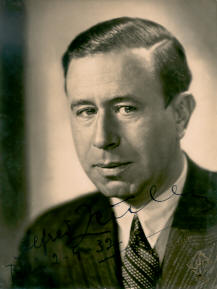
- Born: 26 September 1892; Chicago, Illinois, U.S.
- Died: 1 March 1985 (aged 92); Camano Island, Washington, U.S.
- Occupations: Film producer Film director
- Years active: 1922–53
- Spouse: Lien Deyers (m.1934-div.1939)

Alfred Zeisler (September 26, 1892 – March 1, 1985) was an American-born German film producer, director, actor and screenwriter. He produced 29 films between 1927 and 1936. He also directed 16 films between 1924 and 1949.

== Selected filmography ==
- Rivals (1923)
- The Last Battle (1923)
- Docks of Hamburg (1928)
- Guilty (1928)
- Sajenko the Soviet (1928)
- Under Suspicion (1928)
- The League of Three (1929)
- High Treason (1929)
- The Smuggler's Bride of Mallorca (1929)
- Scandal in Baden-Baden (1929)
- The Shot in the Sound Film Studio (1930)
- The Tiger Murder Case (1930)
- Express 13 (1931)
- A Shot at Dawn (1932)
- Spoiling the Game (1932)
- The Country Schoolmaster (1933)
- The Star of Valencia (1933 – director)
- Viktor und Viktoria (1933)
- A Door Opens (1933)
- George and Georgette (1934)
- Gold (1934)
- Love and the First Railway (1934)
- Holiday From Myself (1934)
- The Young Count (1935)
- Punks Arrives from America (1935)
- Crime Over London (1936)
- The Amazing Quest of Ernest Bliss (1936 – director)
- Make-Up (1937)
- Enemy of Women (1944)
- Fear (1946 – director)
- Parole, Inc. (1948 – director)
- Alimony (1949 – director)
