= Friedrich Benfer =

German actor (1905–1996)

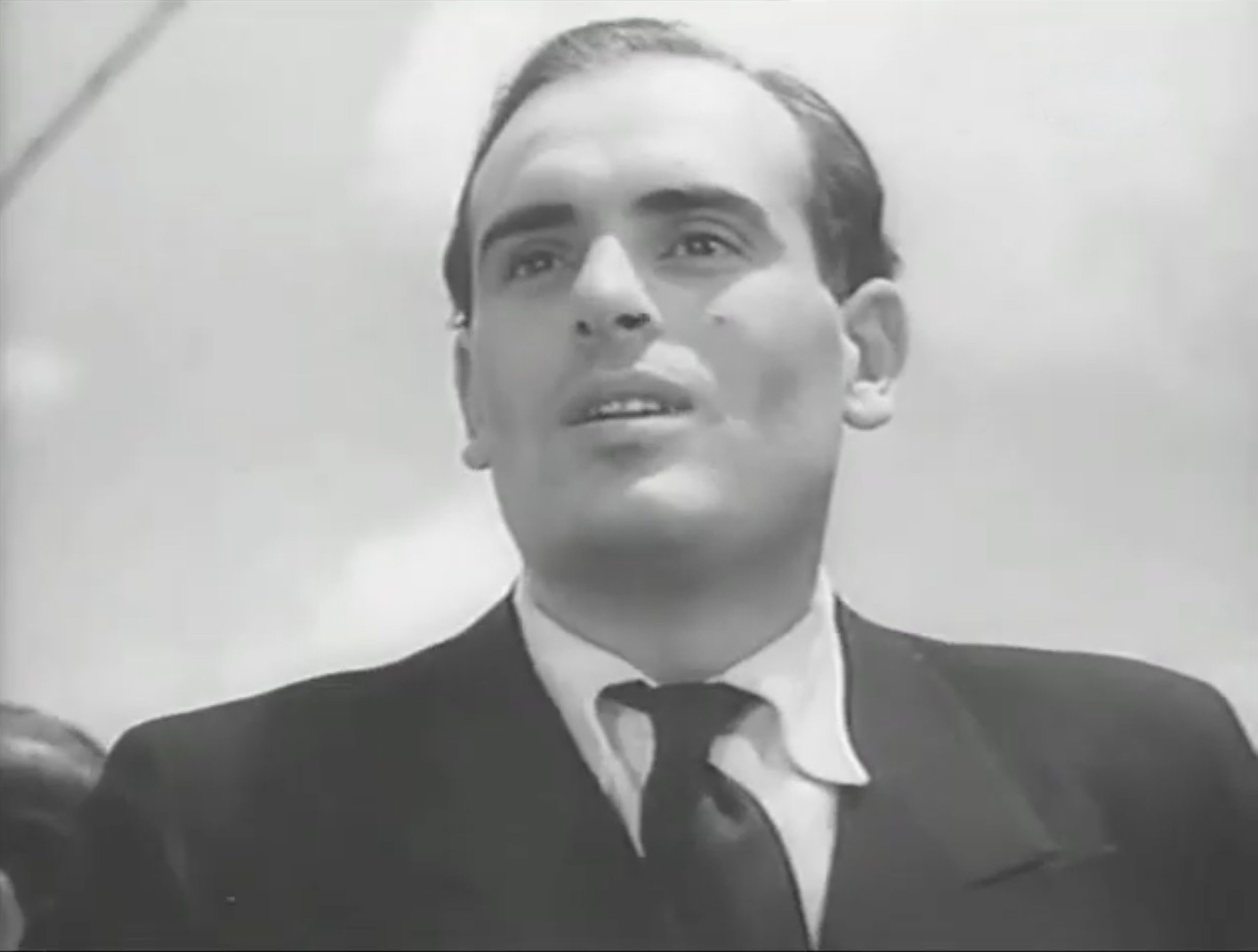
- Benfer in Everybody's Woman (1934)
- Born: 28 August 1905; Naples, Kingdom of Italy
- Died: 30 January 1996 (aged 90); Schwaighofen, Bavaria, Germany
- Occupation: Actor
- Years active: 1929–1942
- Spouse: Jenny Jugo (m. 1950)

Friedrich Benfer (28 August 1905 – 30 January 1996) was a German film actor.

== Selected filmography ==
- I Was a Student at Heidelberg (1927)
- Docks of Hamburg (1928)
- The Smuggler's Bride of Mallorca (1929)
- The Flight from Love (1929)
- The League of Three (1929)
- Three Bluejackets and a Blonde (1933)
- Everybody's Woman (1934)
- Hearts are Trumps (1934)
- Hard Luck Mary (1934)
- Little Mother (1935)
- The Night With the Emperor (1936)
- Victoria in Dover (1936)
- Nights in Andalusia (1938)
- Revolutionary Wedding (1938)
- Wibbel the Tailor (1939)
- The Heart of a Queen (1940)
- Lucrezia Borgia (1940)
- Black Gold (1942)
