= Karl Hannemann =

German actor

Karl Hannemann (4 March 1895 – 13 November 1953) was a German film actor.

Born in Freiberg, Saxony, Germany, he died at the age of 55 in Berlin.

== Selected filmography ==
- The Graveyard of the Living (1921)
- And Yet Luck Came (1923)
- Under the Lantern (1928)
- The Man with the Frog (1929)
- The Street Song (1931)
- No Money Needed (1932)
- Five from the Jazz Band (1932)
- Dreaming Lips (1932)
- Under False Flag (1932)
- Three Bluejackets and a Blonde (1933)
- Hitlerjunge Quex (1933)
- Love, Death and the Devil (1934)
- The Island (1934)
- The Higher Command (1935)
- The Night With the Emperor (1936)
- The Impossible Woman (1936)
- Augustus the Strong (1936)
- The Hour of Temptation (1936)
- The Impossible Woman (1936)
- The Yellow Flag (1937)
- Togger (1937)
- Patriots (1937)
- Dangerous Game (1937)
- Capriccio (1938)
- The Holm Murder Case (1938)
- The Secret Lie (1938)
- Freight from Baltimore (1938)
- You and I (1938)
- Steputat & Co. (1938)
- Robert Koch (1939)
- The Life and Loves of Tschaikovsky (1939)
- Nanette (1940)
- Our Miss Doctor (1940)
- The Three Codonas (1940)
- The Fox of Glenarvon (1940)
- The Girl at the Reception (1940)
- The Lucky Seven (1940)
- We Make Music (1942)
- Andreas Schlüter (1942)
- Diesel (1942)
- Much Ado About Nixi (1942)
- The Old Boss (1942)
- Summer Nights (1944)
- The Woman of My Dreams (1944)
- The Black Robe (1944)
- Life Calls (1944)
- A Cheerful House (1944)
- Somewhere in Berlin (1946)
- Marriage in the Shadows (1947)
- Street Acquaintances (1948)
- Journey to Happiness (1948)
- The Cuckoos (1949)
- The Appeal to Conscience (1949)
- Quartet of Five (1949)
- The Great Mandarin (1949)

== Bibliography ==
- Shandley, Robert R. Rubble Films: German Cinema in the Shadow of the Third Reich. Temple University Press, 2001.
