= Horst Birr =

German actor (1912–1943)

- Born: 17 February 1912; Leipzig, Germany
- Died: 8 October 1943 (aged 31)
- Occupation: Actor
- Years active: 1934-1941

Horst Birr (17 February 1912 – 8 October 1943) was a German actor. He appeared in more than 40 films between 1934 and 1941. Birr was a member of the Nazi Party. There are different accounts about his death. Some sources state that he committed suicide with his wife Hertha Jische (Jicha, 1912–1943) once it became known he was half-Jewish.

== Selected filmography ==
- Hearts are Trumps (1934)
- Playing with Fire (1934)
- Music in the Blood (1934)
- The Night With the Emperor (1936)
- The Abduction of the Sabine Women (1936)
- Savoy Hotel 217 (1936)
- The Merry Wives (1936)
- Ride to Freedom (1937)
- Seven Slaps (1937)
- Napoleon Is to Blame for Everything (1938)
- The Impossible Mister Pitt (1938)
- Nanon (1938)
- The Stars Shine (1938)
- D III 88 (1939)
- Between River and Steppe (1939)
- Shoulder Arms (1939)
- The Fox of Glenarvon (1940)
- The Three Codonas (1940)
- Six Days of Leave (1941)
- Battle Squadron Lützow (1941)
