= Theo Mackeben =

German pianist, conductor and composer (1897–1953)

External audio
- Shellac recordings with Theo Mackeben in the Online Archive of the Österreichische Mediathek

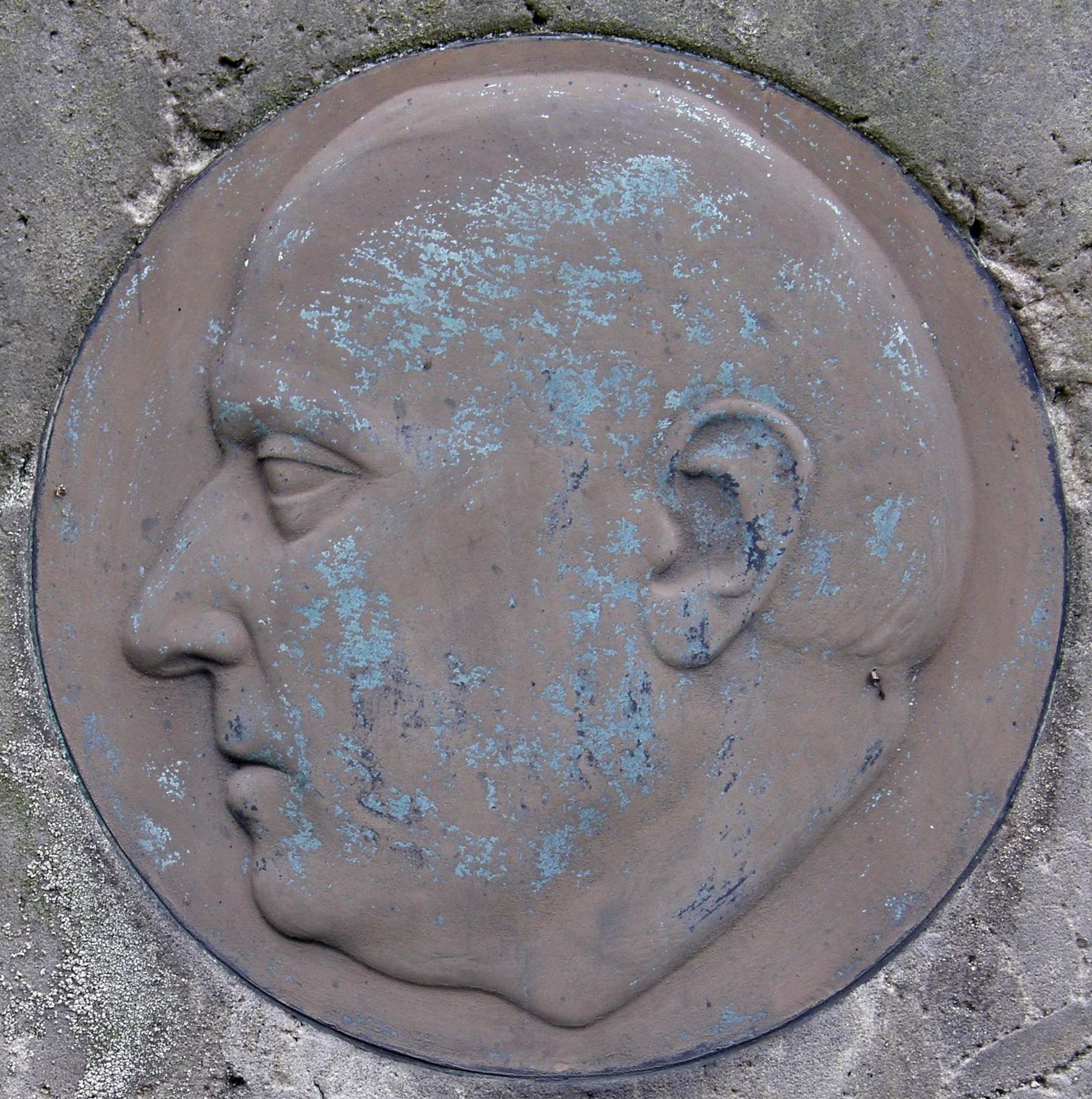
Relief from Mackeben's tombstone

Theo Mackeben, born 5 January 1897 in Preußisch Stargard, Westpreußen, died 10 January 1953 in Berlin, was a German pianist, conductor, and composer, particularly of film music.

== Life and career ==
From 1916 to 1920 Mackeben studied violin and piano at the Hochschule für Musik Köln, as well as taking lessons from Jules de Westheim. He then became active as a café and radio pianist during the 1920s, at the Café Größenwahn and the Hotel Esplanade in Berlin.

In 1928 at the Theater am Schiffbauerdamm he conducted the first performance of Dreigroschenoper. Mackeben arranged the music from Millöckers operetta Gräfin Dubarry, for a 1931 production entitled Die Dubarry including an original song Ich schenk mein Herz nur dir allein.

In the 1930s he composed music for stage plays and over 50 films, including some directed by Max Ophüls, Gustaf Gründgens, and Willy Forst. After the war, he wrote a piano concerto and a Sinfonische Ballade for cello and orchestra, while also being conductor at the Metropol-Theater.

After the end of the Second World War, Mackeben was for two seasons the musical director of the Berlin Metropol-Theater.

== Recordings ==
As a conductor, Mackeben's recordings from the late 1920s through the 1930s include extracts from Die Dreigroschenoper (in 1930 in conjunction with the film soundtrack with Lotte Lenya) and Die Dubarry, Scassola's Laendische Suite, Mendelssohn's 'Spring Song', and fantasies from Smetana's Bartered Bride, Zeller's Der Vogelhändler, Verdi's La traviata, Weill's Mahagonny and Suppé's Die schöne Galathée, on labels such as Telefunken and Berlin.

A LP selection of Mackeben's music was recorded in 1980 by Das Grosse Orchester Willi Stech on the HGBS label, and in 1995 a CD by the WDR Symphony Orchestra Cologne conducted by Emmerich Smola was published by Capriccio.

== Works ==
=== Operettas ===
- 1931: Die Dubarry
- 1932: Die Journalisten
- 1934: Lady Fanny and The Servant Problem
- 1934: Liebe auf Reisen
- 1938: Anita und der Teufel
- 1943: Der goldene Käfig
- 1950: Die Versuchung der Antonia

=== Film scores ===
- Chasing Fortune (1930)
- I Go Out and You Stay Here (1931)
- A Tremendously Rich Man (1932)
- Five from the Jazz Band (1932)
- How Shall I Tell My Husband? (1932)
- Thea Roland (1932)
- Liebelei (1933)
- Love, Death and the Devil (1934)
- The Grand Duke's Finances (1934)
- Make Me Happy (1935)
- Lessons in Love (1935)
- The Devil in the Bottle (1935)
- Pygmalion (1935)
- Girls in White (1936)
- Under Blazing Heavens (1936)
- Intermezzo (1936)
- Dance on the Volcano (1938)
- Heimat (1938)
- The Life and Loves of Tschaikovsky (1939)
- Bel Ami (1939)
- The Wedding Trip (1939)
- Das Herz der Königin (1940)
- Bal Paré (1940)
- Ohm Krüger (1941)
- The Way to Freedom (1941)
- Wedding in Barenhof (1942)
- An Old Heart Becomes Young Again (1943)
- Germanin (1943)
- Women Are No Angels (1943)
- The Bath in the Barn (1943)
- And the Heavens Above Us (1947)
- Chemistry and Love (1948)
- The Trip to Marrakesh (1949)
- Don't Dream, Annette (1949)
- Who Is This That I Love? (1950)
- The Sinner (1951)
- Miracles Still Happen (1951)
- The Sergeant's Daughter (1952)
- Captive Soul (1952)

=== Other music ===
- Piano Concerto (1945)
- Sinfonische Ballade for cello and orchestra (1946)
