= List of Austrian films of the 1940s =

This is a list of films produced in the Cinema of Austria in the 1940s ordered by year of release. For an alphabetical list of articles on Austrian films see Category:Austrian films.

== 1940s ==
Title	Director	Cast	Genre	Notes
1940 (as part of Nazi Germany)
Judgement Day	Franz Seitz	Hans Holt, Olly Holzmann, Susi Nicoletti	Comedy	
My Daughter Lives in Vienna (Meine Tochter lebt in Wien)	E.W. Emo	Hans Moser, Paul Hörbiger	Comedy	Wien-Film
Operetta (Operette)	Willi Forst, Karl Hartl	Willi Forst, Maria Holst, Dora Komar		Wien Film/Deutsche Forst-Filmproduktion
Der Postmeister (The Postmaster)	Gustav Ucicky	Heinrich George, Hilde Krahl	Drama	Wien-Film
Seven Years Hard Luck (Sieben Jahre Pech)	Ernst Marischka	Wolf Albach-Retty, Olly Holzmann, Theo Lingen	Comedy	Styria-Film
Vienna Tales (Wiener G'schichten)	Géza von Bolváry	Hedwig Bleibtreu, Siegfried Breuer	Comedy	Wien-Film/Terra/Styria-Film
1941 (as part of Nazi Germany)
Beloved Augustin (Der liebe Augustin)	E. W. Emo	Paul Hörbiger, Franz Böheim, Maria Andergast	Biography	Wien-Film
Heimkehr (Homecoming)	Gustav Ucicky	Paula Wessely, Attila Hörbiger, Carl Raddatz	propaganda	Wien-Film
Love Is Duty Free (Liebe ist zollfrei)	E. W. Emo	Hans Moser, Oskar Sima	propaganda comedy	Wien-Film
1942 (as part of Nazi Germany)
Brüderlein fein	Hans Thimig	Paul Hörbiger, Franz Böheim	Biography	Wien-Film
Destiny	Géza von Bolváry	Heinrich George, Werner Hinz	Drama	Wien-Film
Seven Years of Good Luck (Sieben Jahre Glück)	Ernst Marischka	Hans Moser, Theo Lingen	Comedy	Bavaria-Filmkunst
Vienna Blood (1942) (Wiener Blut)	Willi Forst		Comedy	Wien Film/Deutsche Forst-Filmproduktion
Whom the Gods Love (Wen die Götter lieben)	Karl Hartl	Hans Holt, Irene von Meyendorff	Biography	Wien-Film
1943 (as part of Nazi Germany)
Abenteuer im Grand Hotel (Adventure in the Grand Hotel)	Ernst Marischka	Carola Höhn, Hans Moser	Comedy	Styria-Film
Das Ferienkind (The Holiday Child)	Karl Leiter	Lizzi Holzschuh, Hans Moser	Comedy	Wien-Film
Die große Welt der Kinderaugen (The Great World of Children's Eyes)			Psychology/culture	Wien-Film
Vienna 1910 (Wien 1910)	E. W. Emo	Rudolf Forster, Herbert Hübner	propaganda	Wien-Film
The White Dream	Géza von Cziffra	Olly Holzmann, Elfriede Datzig, Wolf Albach-Retty	Musical comedy	Wien-Film

== 1944 ==
Title	Director	Cast	Genre	Notes
1944 (as part of Nazi Germany)
The Heart Must Be Silent (Das Herz muß schweigen)	Gustav Ucicky	Paula Wessely, Mathias Wieman, Werner Hinz	Drama	Wien-Film
Heimat am Steilhang (Home on the Slope)				Wien-Film
Hundstage (Dog Days)	Géza von Cziffra	Olly Holzmann, Wolf Albach-Retty	Comedy	Wien-Film/Deutsche Forst-Filmproduktion
Schrammeln	Géza von Bolváry	Marte Harell, Paul Hörbiger, Hans Moser	Comedy	
Ein Tag in der Wachau (A Day in the Wachau)				Wien-Film

== 1946 ==
Title	Director	Cast	Genre	Notes
1946
Glaube an mich (Believe In Me)	Géza von Cziffra	Marte Harell	Comedy	Löwen-Filmproduktion
Schleichendes Gift (Creeping Poison)	Hermann Wallbrück	Ernst Neuhardt, Elinore Beck		Standard-Steurer Film

== 1947 ==
1947
Erde (Earth)	Leopold Hainisch	Eduard Köck, Ilse Exl, Anna Exl	Drama	Omnia-Film (Switzerland)/Tirol-Film
Die Glücksmühle (The Mill of Happiness)	Emmerich Hanus	Thea Weis, Martha Lukas, Erich Dörner	Musical comedy	Belvedere-Film
Der Hofrat Geiger (Hofrat Geiger)	Hans Wolff	Paul Hörbiger, Maria Andergast, Hans Moser, Joseph Egger, Waltraut Haas	Comedy	Sascha-Film
The Immortal Face (Das unsterbliche Antlitz)	Géza von Cziffra	O. W. Fischer, Marianne Schönauer, Helene Thimig	Biography	Cziffra-Film
It's Only Love (Seine einzige Liebe)	Emmerich Hanus	Franz Böheim, Heinz Conrads	Biography	
Singende Engel (Singing Angels)	Gustav Ucicky	Gustav Waldau, Wiener Sängerknaben	Musical	Vindobona-Film

== 1948 ==
1948
Title	Director	Cast	Genre	Notes
The Angel with the Trumpet	Karl Hartl	Maria Schell, Hans Holt, Oskar Werner, Paula Wessely, Attila Hörbiger	Drama	Neue Wiener Filmproduktion/Vindobona-Film
Anni	Max Neufeld	Elfie Mayerhofer, Siegfried Breuer	Romance	Co-production with Germany
Arlberg Express	Eduard von Borsody	Paul Hubschmid, Elfe Gerhart		Donau-Filmproduktion Eduard Hoesch
The Freckle	Rudolf Carl	Oskar Sima, Grete Zimmer, Fritz Imhoff	Comedy	
Fregola	Harald Röbbeling	Marika Rökk, Rudolf Prack	Musical	
The Heavenly Waltz	Géza von Cziffra	Elfie Mayerhofer, Paul Hubschmid, Inge Konradi	Comedy	
Maresi	Hans Thimig	Attila Hörbiger, Maria Schell, Siegfried Breuer	Drama	
On Resonant Shores	Hans Unterkircher	Marianne Schönauer, Curd Jürgens, Otto Tressler	Drama	
The Other Life	Rudolf Steinboeck	Aglaja Schmid, Robert Lindner, Gustav Waldau	Drama	
The Singing House	Franz Antel	Curd Jürgens, Hannelore Schroth, Hans Moser	Musical comedy	
The Trial	Georg Wilhelm Pabst	Ernst Deutsch, Ewald Balser, Marianne Schönauer	Drama	
Ulli and Marei	Leopold Hainisch	Eduard Köck, Attila Hörbiger, Ludwig Auer	Drama	Wien-Film

== 1949 ==
1949
Title	Director	Cast	Genre	Notes
Dear Friend	Rudolf Steinboeck	Vilma Degischer, Johannes Heesters, Erik Frey	Drama	
Eroica	Walter Kolm-Veltée, Karl Hartl	Ewald Balser, Marianne Schönauer, Judith Holzmeister	Biography	
Hexen (Witches)	Hans Schott-Schöbinger	Edith Mill		Alpin-Film-Austria
Lambert Feels Threatened	Géza von Cziffra	Hannelore Schroth, Curd Jürgens, Leopold Rudolf	Crime	
Liebling der Welt / Rosen der Liebe / Seine Hoheit darf nicht küssen	Max Neufeld	Nadine Gray, O. W. Fischer		Arta/Berna/Donau-Film Wien
Märchen vom Glück (Fairy Tales of Happiness)	Arthur De Glahs	O.W. Fischer, Maria Holst	Musical comedy	Belvedere-Film/Deisinger Film
Matthäus-Passion (St Matthew Passion)	Ernst Marischka	Elisabeth Schwarzkopf	Documentary, Musical	Co-production with Italy. Erma-Film/Campidoglio Film
Mysterious Shadows	Georg Wilhelm Pabst	Paul Hubschmid, Ilse Werner	Drama	
Vagabonds	Rolf Hansen	Paula Wessely, Attila Hörbiger, Adrienne Gessner	Drama	
Viennese Girls (Wiener Mädeln)	Willi Forst	Willi Forst, Dora Komar, Vera Schmid	Musical comedy	Wien-Film/Deutsche Forst-Filmproduktion
We've Just Got Married	Hans Effenberger	Lotte Lang, Maria Eis, Hans Olden	Comedy	
