= E. W. Emo =

Austrian film director (1898–1975)

- Born: Emerich Josef Wojtek; 11 July 1898; Seebarn, Austria
- Died: 2 December 1975 (aged 77); Vienna, Austria
- Occupations: Film director, screenwriter
- Spouse: Anita Dorris
- Children: Maria Emo

E. W. Emo (Emerich Walter Emo, born Emerich Josef Wojtek, 11 July 1898; died 2 December 1975) was an Austrian film director.

Emo specialized in comedies, 21 of them with the actor Hans Moser. He also worked outside Austria and wrote screenplays.

== Life ==
Emerich Josef Wojtek, born in Seebarn near Grafenwörth in Austria, was the son of a teacher. He attended the Provincial Secondary School (Landesrealschule) in Krems an der Donau and did military service during World War I. In 1919 he worked at first as a bit-part actor, then as a director's assistant and production manager, and finally as an assistant film director. In that capacity in 1927 he moved to Berlin, where he also worked as a cutter and dramaturgist with a number of different directors.

In 1928 he directed his first film drama, called Flitterwochen ("Honeymoon"). After that he made many light entertainment films, and with the advent of sound films, also filmed several musicals and operettas. As a director Emo contributed much to the popularity of actors such as Paul Hörbiger, Theo Lingen and above all Hans Moser, who appeared in 21 of his films altogether. In 1936 Emo founded in Berlin, with Paul Hörbiger and the Austrian consul Karl Künzel, the Algefa-Film company. In the same year he officially changed his name to his business name, Emerich Walter Emo. He later ran the film company Emo-Film.

During the time of National Socialist government, he was reckoned one the principal directors of Wien-Film, where he continued to make light comedies, often with Moser, to whom he allowed a great deal of latitude for improvisation. In many of his films Emo also criticised the clichés of the Wiener Film (the standard popular, sentimental and nostalgic "Viennese film"), for example in Anton der letzte ("Anton the Last") (1939), where he exaggerated Hans Moser's usual screen persona into petulance and querulence, and in Liebe ist zollfrei ("Love is Duty-free") (1941), where he represented the high society of Vienna not as vulgar, but as snobbish and malicious.

Emo's only expressly propagandist film was Wien 1910 (1943), which was made with the intention, through its distorted representation of the politics of Vienna around the antisemitic Karl Lueger and the German nationalist Georg Ritter von Schönerer, of legitimizing the Anschluss of Austria by Germany. The attempt failed, however, as the film was still too "Austrian" for the National Socialists and was forbidden to be shown in the Ostmark, as Austria was known under National Socialist rule; in Germany it attracted little interest.

Emo made a few more films after the end of World War II.

He married the German actress Anita Dorris in 1930; their daughter is the actress Maria Emo (b. 1936).

E. W. Emo died on 2 December 1975 in Vienna of arteriosclerosis.

== Selected filmography ==
- Honeymoon (1928)
- What Price Love? (1929)
- Im Prater blühen wieder die Bäume (1929)
- Twice Married (1930)
- The Jumping Jack (1930)
- Heute nacht - eventuell (1930)
- The Unknown Guest (1931)
- Ich heirate meinen Mann (1931)
- One Night with You (1932)
- The Testament of Cornelius Gulden (1932)
- Wrong Number, Miss (1932)
- The Ladies Diplomat (1932)
- Modern Dowry (1932)
- Model Wanted (1933)
- The Girl with the Bruise (1933)
- Little Girl, Great Fortune (1933)
- Marion, That's Not Nice (1933)
- And Who Is Kissing Me? (1933)
- Paganini (1934)
- The Double (1934)
- The Gentleman Without a Residence (1934)
- Petersburger Nächte (1935)
- The Bird Seller (1935)
- Circus Saran (1935)
- The Schimeck Family (1935)
- Last Stop (1935)
- Heaven on Earth (1935)
- Three Girls for Schubert (1936) (also wrote the screenplay)
- Ungeküsst soll man nicht schlafen gehn (1936)
- The Cabbie's Song (1936)
- The Fairy Doll (1936)
- A Hoax (1936)
- The Missing Wife (1937)
- Der Mann, von dem man spricht (1937)
- The Unexcused Hour (1937)
- The Optimist (1938)
- Thirteen Chairs (1938)
- Anton the Last (1939)
- Immortal Waltz (1939)
- Beloved Augustin (1940)
- My Daughter Lives in Vienna (1940)
- Love Is Duty Free (1941)
- Black on White (1943)
- Two Happy People (1943)
- Vienna 1910 (Karl Lueger, Bürgermeister von Wien) (1943)
- By a Nose (1949)
- Nothing But Coincidence (1949)
- Theodore the Goalkeeper (1950)
- Hilfe, ich bin unsichtbar (1951)
- Shame on You, Brigitte! (1952)
- Irene in Trouble (1953)
- Lady's Choice (1953)
- Her Corporal (1956)
- Imperial and Royal Field Marshal (1956)
- Ober, zahlen! (1957)
- Wenn die Bombe platzt (1958)
