= By a Nose =

By a Nose may refer to:

- By a Nose (1931 film), a German sports comedy film
- By a Nose (1949 film), a West German sports comedy film, a remake of the above
