= We're Dancing on the Rainbow =

1952 German-Italian film

- German film poster
- Directed by: Carmine Gallone; Arthur Maria Rabenalt
- Written by: Gaspare Cataldo; Carmine Gallone; Ugo Zatterin
- Produced by: Frank Clifford; Angelo Rizzoli
- Starring: Inge Egger; Isa Barzizza; Karl Schönböck
- Cinematography: Konstantin Irmen-Tschet; Gerhard Peters; Giovanni Pucci
- Edited by: Niccolò Lazzari
- Music by: Hans Fritz Beckmann; Bert Grund; Renzo Rossellini
- Production companies: Allfram-Film; Produzione Gallone; Rizzoli Film
- Distributed by: Allianz Filmverleih
- Release dates: 25 December 1952 (West Germany); 18 February 1953 (Italy)
- Running time: 95 minutes
- Countries: West Germany; Italy
- Languages: German; Italian

We're Dancing on the Rainbow (German: Wir tanzen auf dem Regenbogen, Italian: Senza veli) is a 1952 German–Italian musical melodrama film directed by Carmine Gallone and Arthur Maria Rabenalt and starring Inge Egger, Isa Barzizza and Karl Schönböck. It was shot at the Cinecittà Studios in Rome and the Bavaria Studios in Munich and on location around Naples and Pompeii. The film's sets were designed by the art directors Hans Ledersteger, Ernst Richter and Gastone Medin.

== Synopsis ==
In Naples, chemistry student Gino becomes so distracted by the musical theatre revue troupe staying at his boarding house that he fails his exam. However Edith, the theatre's secretary, discovers that he has a great talent as a singer and persuaded her boss to hire him. A tour in Germany launches Gino as a popular star. Edith is in love with the young Italian, but his eye is entirely for the company's diva, soubrette Jeannette. When Gino is wrongly accused of theft it is Edith, rather than the selfish Jeanette, who clears him.

== Cast ==
- Inge Egger as Edith
- Isa Barzizza as Jeannette
- Karl Schönböck as Philip
- Gino Mattera as Gino
- Siegfried Breuer as Sophokles
- Dante Maggio as Gennaro
- Harry Meyen as Grigory
- Ave Ninchi as Donna Rosa
- Giuseppe Varni as Bachmeier
- Arno Ebert as Kriminalinspektor
- Rudolf Schündler as Kriminalassistent
- Karl-Heinz Peters as Hoteldirektor
