= Seven Years Hard Luck =

1940 German romantic comedy film

- Directed by: Ernst Marischka
- Written by: Ernst Marischka
- Produced by: Heinrich Haas
- Starring: Hans Moser; Ida Wüst; Olly Holzmann
- Cinematography: Károly Kurzmayer
- Edited by: Arnfried Heyne
- Music by: Karl Föderl; Oskar Wagner
- Production company: Styria-Film
- Distributed by: Süddeutsche Commerz Film
- Release date: 19 December 1940
- Running time: 90 minutes
- Country: Germany
- Language: German

Seven Years Hard Luck (German: Sieben Jahre Pech) is a 1940 German romantic comedy film directed by Ernst Marischka and starring Hans Moser, Ida Wüst and Olly Holzmann.

The film's sets were designed by the art directors Hans Ledersteger and Heinrich Richter. The film was produced by the independent company Styria-Film in German-controlled Austria. It was followed by a sequel Seven Years of Good Luck in 1942.

== Synopsis ==
After breaking a mirror, a writer is convinced he will have seven years' bad luck. This complicates his romantic aspirations.

== Cast ==
- Hans Moser as Dr. Teisinger
- Ida Wüst as Frau Teisinger
- Olly Holzmann as Gertie
- Ida Turay as Lilly
- Wolf Albach-Retty as Heinz Kersten
- Theo Lingen as Paul, Kerstens Diener
- Oskar Sima as Poppelbaum
- Alfred Neugebauer as Lillys Chef
- Robert Valberg as Standesbeamter
- Oskar Wegrostek as Dicker Mann
- Lina Frank as Wirtschafterin bei Dr. Teisinger
- Eugen Guenther as Freund von Dr. Teisinger
- Pepi Glöckner-Kramer as Frau mit dem kranken Kanarienvogel
- Johannes Roth as Beamter der Korrespondenzabteilung

== Bibliography ==
- Bock, Hans-Michael & Bergfelder, Tim. The Concise CineGraph. Encyclopedia of German Cinema. Berghahn Books, 2009.
- Robert Von Dassanowsky. Austrian Cinema. McFarland & Co, 2005.
