= A Star Fell from Heaven =

A Star Fell from Heaven may refer to:

- A Star Fell from Heaven (1934 film), an Austrian film
- A Star Fell from Heaven (1936 film), a British film
