= Seven Years of Happiness =

- Directed by: Ernst Marischka; Roberto Savarese
- Written by: Ernst Marischka; Roberto Savarese
- Starring: Vivi Gioi; Wolf Albach-Retty; Hans Moser
- Cinematography: Franz Koch; Václav Vích
- Edited by: Ines Donarelli
- Music by: Giovanni Militello; Oskar Wagner
- Production companies: Bavaria Film; Fono Roma
- Distributed by: Variety Distribution
- Release date: 7 January 1943
- Running time: 82 minutes
- Country: Italy
- Language: Italian

Seven Years of Happiness (Italian: Sette anni di felicità) is a 1943 Italian "white-telephones" comedy film directed by Ernst Marischka and Roberto Savarese and starring Vivi Gioi, Wolf Albach-Retty and Hans Moser.

The film's sets were designed by the art director Piero Filippone. It was shot at the Cinecittà Studios in Rome. It was co-produced with the German firm Bavaria Film, and a separate German version Seven Years of Good Luck was also made.

== Cast ==
- Vivi Gioi as Ella Jüttner
- Wolf Albach-Retty as Kersten
- Hans Moser as Augusto Daisinger
- Theo Lingen as Gribling, il cameriere
- Elli Parvo as Melitta, la cameriera
- Carlo Romano as José, l'allevatore di tori
- Paolo Stoppa as Il bandito balbuziente
- Rio Nobile as L'agente di polizia
- Silvio Bagolini as Febo
- Primo Carnera as Un poliziotto
- Liana Del Balzo as La cantante sul camion
- Antonio Mancuso as Il bandito che ruba i soldi

== Bibliography ==
- Bock, Hans-Michael & Bergfelder, Tim. The Concise CineGraph. Encyclopedia of German Cinema. Berghahn Books, 2009.
- Lancia, Enrico & Melelli, Fabio. Attori stranieri del nostro cinema. Gremese Editore, 2006.
