= Ernst Richter (art director) =

Austrian art director

- Born: 28 October 1890; Vienna, Austro-Hungarian Empire
- Died: 8 August 1961 (aged 72); Grünwald, Bavaria; West Germany
- Occupation: Art director
- Years active: 1925–1960 (film)

Ernst Richter (1890-1961) was an Austrian art director who designed film sets on Austrian and Germany productions. He frequently collaborated with Hans Ledersteger.

== Selected filmography ==
- Mother Song (1937)
- Vienna Tales (1940)
- Judgement Day (1940)
- Voice of the Heart (1942)
- A Man for My Wife (1943)
- My Summer Companion (1943)
- By a Nose (1949)
- Nothing But Coincidence (1949)
- Furioso (1950)
- Blondes for Export (1950)
- Kissing Is No Sin (1950)
- In München steht ein Hofbräuhaus (1951)
- A Thousand Red Roses Bloom (1952)
- We're Dancing on the Rainbow (1952)
- Until We Meet Again (1952)
- A Musical War of Love (1953)
- Ave Maria (1953)
- Master of Life and Death (1955)
- Sacred Lie (1955)
- Holiday in Tyrol (1956)
- El Hakim (1957)
- Marriages Forbidden (1957)
- The Daring Swimmer (1957)
- Rosemary (1958)
- Gräfin Mariza (1958)
- A Song Goes Round the World (1958)
- The Blue Sea and You (1959)
- Brainwashed (1960)
- Boomerang (1960)
- Ingeborg (1960)
- Stefanie in Rio (1960)

== Bibliography ==
- Fritsche, Maria. Homemade Men In Postwar Austrian Cinema: Nationhood, Genre and Masculinity . Berghahn Books, 2013.
- Morcillo, Marta Garcia Hanesworth, Pauline & Marchena, Óscar Lapeña . Imagining Ancient Cities in Film: From Babylon to Cinecittà. Routledge, 2015.
