= Seven Years of Good Luck =

1942 film

- Directed by: Ernst Marischka
- Written by: Ernst Marischka
- Starring: Wolf Albach-Retty; Theo Lingen; Hans Moser
- Cinematography: Franz Koch; Václav Vích
- Music by: Oskar Wagner
- Production company: Bavaria Film
- Distributed by: Bavaria Film
- Release date: 9 October 1942
- Running time: 90 minutes
- Country: Germany
- Language: German

Seven Years of Good Luck (German: Sieben Jahre Glück) is a 1942 German comedy film directed by Ernst Marischka and starring Wolf Albach-Retty, Theo Lingen and Hans Moser. It is a sequel to the 1940 film Seven Years Hard Luck.

It was shot at the Cinecittà Studios in Rome. The film's sets were designed by the art director Piero Filippone. A separate Italian version Seven Years of Happiness was also released.

== Cast ==
In alphabetical order

- Wolf Albach-Retty as Heinz Kersten
- Theo Lingen as Paul Griebling
- Hans Moser as Dr. August Teisinger
- Rio Nobile
- Elli Parvo as Melitta
- Hannelore Schroth as Hella Jüttner
- Oskar Sima

== Bibliography ==
- Bock, Hans-Michael & Bergfelder, Tim. The Concise CineGraph. Encyclopedia of German Cinema. Berghahn Books, 2009.
- Von Dassanowsky, Robert. Austrian Cinema. McFarland & Co, 2005.
