= A Thousand Red Roses Bloom =

1952 film

- German film poster
- German: Tausend rote Rosen blüh'n
- Directed by: Alfred Braun
- Written by: Werner P. Zibaso
- Produced by: Luggi Waldleitner
- Starring: Rudolf Prack; Winnie Markus; O. W. Fischer
- Cinematography: Bruno Stephan
- Edited by: Elisabeth Kleinert-Neumann
- Music by: Herbert Trantow
- Production company: Roxy Film
- Distributed by: Gloria Film
- Release date: 28 August 1952
- Running time: 90 minutes
- Country: West Germany
- Language: German

A Thousand Red Roses Bloom (German: Tausend rote Rosen blüh'n) is a 1952 West German drama film directed by Alfred Braun and starring Rudolf Prack, Winnie Markus and O. W. Fischer. It was shot at the Göttingen Studios. The film's sets were designed by the art directors Hans Ledersteger and Ernst Richter.

== Synopsis ==
Engineer Andreas Mahler heads to Mexico for a job. His sweetheart Ebba promises her his eternal love. However, her father wants Ebba to marry Hannes a prosperous farmer's sons. He burns all letters from Andreas to Ebba, leading her to think that he has forgotten her. She agrees to the marriage proposal of Hannes and has a son with him. Years later Andreas returns to the area to work on a bridge across the Weser. Ebba runs into him and both realise that their letters had been intercepted. Ebba leaves her husband and son and goes away with Andreas. However, she soon comes to miss her son and decides that her place is with him and not her lover.

== Cast ==
- Rudolf Prack as Hannes Frings
- Winnie Markus as Ebba
- O. W. Fischer as Andreas Mahler
- Maria Holst as Marita
- Otto Gebühr as Rosenbauer
- Margarete Haagen as Anna
- Ludwig Schmitz as Süffchen
- Eugen Dumont as Der alte Frings
- Josef Sieber as Jupp Siedel
- Gunnar Möller as Himpemax
- Kurt Reimann as Angelo
- Fritz Eberth as Schaub
- Lotte Rausch as Roswitha
- Joachim Schütt as Der kleine Klaus
- Peter Fischer as Mambo
- Julia Esbach
