= The Missing Wife (1937 film) =

1937 film

- Directed by: E.W. Emo
- Written by: Hans Gustl Kernmayr; Aldo von Pinelli
- Based on: The Missing Wife by Max Dürr
- Produced by: Oskar Glück
- Starring: Paul Kemp; Lucie Englisch; Hans Moser
- Cinematography: Eduard Hoesch
- Edited by: Lisbeth Neumann
- Music by: Heinz Sandauer
- Production company: Projectograph-Film
- Distributed by: Siegel Monopolfilm
- Release date: 8 November 1937
- Running time: 84 minutes
- Country: Austria
- Language: German

The Missing Wife (German: Die verschwundene Frau) is a 1937 Austrian comedy film directed by E.W. Emo and starring Paul Kemp, Lucie Englisch and Hans Moser. It was shot at the Sievering Studios in Vienna. The film's sets were designed by the art director Julius von Borsody. Based on a novel by Max Dürr, it was remake of the 1929 silent film of the same title.

== Synopsis ==
Ferdinand Bartel pays so much attention to his dog that his neglected wife Hansi decides to leave him temporarily. However, in a misunderstanding a judicial assistant mistakenly believes that he is about to murder her and launches his own investigation into the case.

== Cast ==
- Paul Kemp as Ferdinand Bartel
- Lucie Englisch as Hansi seine Frau
- Hans Moser as Vieröckl
- Trude Marlen as Doctor Hanna Karsten
- Jupp Hussels as Doctor Karl Steiner
- Theo Lingen as Peter
- Oskar Sima as Tobias Zeindl
- Lina Woiwode as Fanny

== Bibliography ==
- Goble, Alan. The Complete Index to Literary Sources in Film. Walter de Gruyter, 1999.
- Klaus, Ulrich J. Deutsche Tonfilme: Jahrgang 1937. Klaus-Archiv, 1988.
- Von Dassanowsky, Robert. Screening Transcendence: Film Under Austrofascism and the Hollywood Hope, 1933-1938. Indiana University Press, 2018
