= Nothing But Coincidence =

1949 film

- German film poster
- German: Nichts als Zufälle
- Directed by: E. W. Emo
- Written by: E. W. Emo; Karl Farkas
- Produced by: Kurt Ulrich
- Starring: Theo Lingen; Sonja Ziemann; Josef Meinrad
- Cinematography: Kurt Schulz
- Edited by: Lena Neumann
- Music by: Franz Grothe
- Production company: Berolina Film
- Distributed by: Herzog Film
- Release date: 1 July 1949
- Running time: 86 minutes
- Country: West Germany
- Language: German

Nothing But Coincidence (German: Nichts als Zufälle) is a 1949 West German comedy film directed by E. W. Emo and starring Theo Lingen, Sonja Ziemann, and Josef Meinrad. It was shot at the Göttingen Studios. The film's sets were designed by the art directors Hans Ledersteger and Ernst Richter.

== Cast ==
- Theo Lingen as Dr. Renatus Elmhorst
- Sonja Ziemann as Gerti Danzer
- Josef Meinrad as Willy Wendel
- Susi Nicoletti as Liane Reitmayer
- Grethe Weiser as Helene Danzer
- Fritz Kampers as August Danzer
- Dorit Kreysler as Frau Osterloh
- Jakob Tiedtke as Onkel David
- Margarete Haagen as Dorothea Reitmayer
- Hans Richter as Emil Patzenberger
- Rudolf Schündler as Polizeikommissar
- Franz-Otto Krüger as Herr Osterloh
- Else Elster as Frau Zibulka
- Albert Florath as Standesbeamter
- Gertrud Wolle as Frau Patzenberger
- Hubert von Meyerinck as Schönheitssaloninhaber
