= A Mother's Love (1939 film) =

1939 film

- German film poster
- German: Mutterliebe
- Directed by: Gustav Ucicky
- Written by: Hans Flemming (novel); Gerhard Menzel
- Produced by: Karl Hartl; Erich von Neusser
- Starring: Käthe Dorsch; Paul Hörbiger; Wolf Albach-Retty
- Cinematography: Hans Schneeberger
- Edited by: Rudolf Schaad
- Music by: Willy Schmidt-Gentner
- Production company: Wien-Film
- Distributed by: UFA
- Release date: 19 December 1939
- Running time: 106 minutes
- Country: Germany
- Language: German

A Mother's Love or Mother Love (German: Mutterliebe) is a 1939 drama film directed by Gustav Ucicky and starring Käthe Dorsch, Paul Hörbiger and Wolf Albach-Retty.

It was made by the Vienna-based Wien-Film which had been established following the German annexation of Austria the previous year. The film's sets were designed by the art directors Kurt Herlth and Werner Schlichting.

The film portrays the various sacrifices of a mother for her children. It was one of the comparatively few films made in Nazi Germany that celebrated the role of mothers in society, despite the Nazi Party's official promotion of a cult of motherhood.

== Cast ==
- Käthe Dorsch as Marthe Pirlinger
- Paul Hörbiger as Notar Dr. Koblmüller
- Wolf Albach-Retty as Walter Pirlinger, 1922
- Hans Holt as Paul Pirlinger, 1922
- Hans Hotter as Josef Pirlinger
- Rudolf Prack as Felix Pirlinger, 1922
- Susi Nicoletti as Franzi Pirlinger, 1922
- Siegfried Breuer as Kammersänger
- Frida Richard as Frau Stätter, old washerwoman
- Olly Holzmann as Hanna Pirlinger
- Winnie Markus as Rosl Pirlinger
- Fritz Imhoff as Opernportier
- Eduard Köck as Professor
- Alfred Neugebauer as Schulleiter
- Traudl Stark as Franzi, 1912
- Erich Kuchar as Walter, 1912
- Walter Schweda as Paul, 1912
- Rudolf Rab as Felix, 1912
- Maria Louise Mayer as Beatrice
- Hans Unterkircher as von Neuhausen, ballet master
- Reinhold Häussermann as Onkel Alfred
- Annie Rosar as Frau Ganglberger
- Elisabeth Markus as Beatrix, nurse
- Karl Ehmann as Kanderl, moneylender
- Karl Kneidinger as Lehrer
- Pepi Glöckner-Kramer as Klara, economist
- Fritz Puchstein as drugstore assistant
- Rosl Dorena as Gusti, maid
- Wiener Sängerknaben
- Silvia Kraus as Christl
