= A Musical War of Love =

1953 film

- Directed by: Karl Hartl
- Written by: Karl Hartl; Hugo Maria Kritz (novel)
- Produced by: Luggi Waldleitner
- Starring: Marte Harell; Johannes Heesters; Paul Kemp
- Cinematography: Günther Anders; Hans Schneeberger
- Edited by: Elisabeth Kleinert-Neumann
- Music by: Peter Kreuder
- Production company: Vita-Film
- Distributed by: Deutsche London Film
- Release date: 18 August 1953
- Running time: 94 minutes
- Country: West Germany
- Language: German

A Musical War of Love (German: Liebeskrieg nach Noten) is a 1953 West German comedy film directed by Karl Hartl and starring Marte Harell, Johannes Heesters and Paul Kemp. It was shot at the Bavaria Studios in Munich. The film's sets were designed by the art director Hans Ledersteger and Ernst Richter.

== Cast ==
- Marte Harell as Doctor Käthe Nimrod
- Johannes Heesters as Ralph Beyron
- Paul Kemp as Professor Melchior Quint
- Ernst Waldow as Direktor Winkelmann
- Ingrid Pan as Irmgard Schmuck
- Rudolf Platte as Scharnagl
- Peer Schmidt as Carlo Linetti
- Wilfried Seyferth as Generaldirektor Rabenfuß
- Viktoria von Ballasko as Fräulein Canisius
- Claus Biederstaedt as Rautenkranz
- Eugen Dumont as Justizrat
- Adi Lödel as Stift Toni
- Lina Sand

== Bibliography ==
- John Holmstrom. The Moving Picture Boy: An International Encyclopaedia from 1895 to 1995. Michael Russell, 1996.
