= Madame Bluebeard =

1931 film

- Directed by: Conrad Wiene
- Written by: Karl Hans Strobl (novel); Herbert Juttke; Georg C. Klaren
- Produced by: Liddy Hegewald; Conrad Wiene
- Starring: Lil Dagover; Harry Frank; Otto Hartmann
- Cinematography: Willy Goldberger; Eduard Hoesch
- Music by: Philipp De La Cerda
- Production company: Conrad Wiene Filmproduktion
- Distributed by: Columbia Film (Germany)
- Release date: 1931
- Running time: 71 minutes
- Country: Austria
- Language: German

Madame Bluebeard (German: Madame Blaubart) is a 1931 Austrian drama film directed by Conrad Wiene and starring Lil Dagover, Harry Frank and Otto Hartmann.

The film's sets were designed by the art director Hans Ledersteger.

== Cast ==
- Lil Dagover as Frau Erika Dankwarth
- Harry Frank as Helmuth Krüger
- Otto Hartmann as Baron Terhusen
- Vera Schmiterlöw as Karla, seine Schwester
- Anton Edthofer as Schiereisen
- Vera Salvotti as Die schwarze Käthe
- Alfred Neugebauer as Sykora
- Albert Kersten as Lorenz
- Lotte Deyers as Irre

== Bibliography ==
- Waldman, Harry. Nazi Films in America, 1933-1942. McFarland, 2008.
