= Hotel Sacher (film) =

1939 film

- Directed by: Erich Engel
- Written by: E.G. Seeliger; Marieluise Füringk; Stefan von Kamare; Friedrich Forster
- Produced by: Walter Tjaden
- Starring: Sybille Schmitz; Willy Birgel; Wolf Albach-Retty
- Cinematography: Werner Bohne; Kurt Schulz
- Edited by: René Métain
- Music by: Willy Schmidt-Gentner
- Production company: UFA
- Distributed by: UFA
- Release date: 15 March 1939
- Running time: 88 minutes
- Country: Germany
- Language: German

Hotel Sacher is a 1939 German drama film directed by Erich Engel and starring Sybille Schmitz, Willy Birgel, and Wolf Albach-Retty.

The film's sets were designed by the art director Hans Ledersteger and Hans Richter. It was partly shot on location in Vienna, which had recently been taken over by Nazi Germany. Interior scenes were shot at the Rosenhügel Studios.

== Synopsis ==
Shortly before the First World War at the Hotel Sacher in Vienna, a disgraced Austrian civil servant meets his ex-lover, a female Russian spy.

== Cast ==
- Sybille Schmitz as Nadja Woroneff
- Willy Birgel as Stefan Schefczuk
- Wolf Albach-Retty as Lt. Herrngruber
- Elfriede Datzig as Frau Stoppeling
- Hedwig Bleibtreu as Frau Anna Sacher
- Herbert Hübner as Barnoff
- Leo Peukert as Graf Kusmin
- Karl Günther as Sektionschef Erlauer
- Elfie Mayerhofer as Siddy Erlauer, singer
- Rosa Albach-Retty as Tante Regine im Separee mit den Erlauer Gästen
- Olly Holzmann as Franzi
- Walter Szurovy as Herr Stoppling
- Fritz Imhoff as Portier Seidl
- Karel Stepanek as Franz
- Alfred Neugebauer as Ministerialrat
- Hans Unterkircher as Graf Lagarde
- Otto Glaser
- Herta Mayen as Dancer
- Elisabeth Pünkösdy
- Tibor Halmay
- Richard Waldemar as Waiter Wagner
- Mihail Xantho as Dufour
- Ernst Pröckl as Regierungsrat Weghuber
- Fritz Puchstein
- Ernst Nadherny
- Helene Lauterböck
- Viktor Braun
- Robert Valberg
- Oskar Werner as Liftboy

== See also ==
- Titanic (A similar Nazi propaganda film from 1943, also starring Sybille Schmitz as a Russian socialite)

== Bibliography ==
- Bock, Hans-Michael; Bergfelder, Tim, eds. (2009). The Concise Cinegraph: Encyclopaedia of German Cinema. New York: Berghahn Books. ISBN 978-1-57181-655-9.
- Kreimeier, Klaus (1999). The Ufa Story: A History of Germany's Greatest Film Company, 1918–1945. Berkeley: University of California Press. ISBN 978-0-520-22069-0.
