= Alfred Neugebauer =

Austrian actor

Alfred Neugebauer (24 December 1888 – 14 September 1957) was an Austrian film actor.

== Selected filmography ==
- Money in the Streets (1922)
- Money on the Street (1930)
- Madame Bluebeard (1931)
- Storm in a Water Glass (1931)
- The Prince of Arcadia (1932)
- Our Emperor (1933)
- The Secret of Cavelli (1934)
- Spring Parade (1934)
- A Precocious Girl (1934)
- A Star Fell from Heaven (1934)
- … nur ein Komödiant (1935)
- The World's in Love (1935)
- Everything for the Company (1935)
- Heaven on Earth (1935)
- Harvest (1936)
- The Postman from Longjumeau (1936)
- Confetti (1936)
- Flowers from Nice (1936)
- Where the Lark Sings (1936)
- Konzert in Tirol (1938)
- Mirror of Life (1938)
- Hotel Sacher (1939)
- Madame Butterfly (1939)
- A Mother's Love (1939)
- Vienna Tales (1940)
- Operetta (1940)
- Seven Years Hard Luck (1940)
- Love is Duty Free (1941)
- Thrice Wed (1941)
- Whom the Gods Love (1942)
- Vienna 1910 (1943)
- Women Are No Angels (1943)
- Two Happy People (1943)
- The Heart Must Be Silent (1944)
- Dog Days (1944)
- Viennese Girls (1945)
- Maresi (1948)
- The Angel with the Trumpet (1948)
- Eroica (1949)
- The Fourth Commandment (1950)
- Captive Soul (1952)
- 1. April 2000 (1952)
- No Greater Love (1952)
- The Spendthrift (1953)
- A Night in Venice (1953)
- Grandstand for General Staff (1953)
- Victoria in Dover (1954)
- Royal Hunt in Ischl (1955)
