= Vienna Tales =

1940 film directed by Géza von Bolváry

- Directed by: Géza von Bolváry
- Written by: Hans Gustl Kernmayr (novel); Harald Bratt; Ernst Marischka
- Produced by: Heinrich Haas
- Starring: Marte Harell; Olly Holzmann; Hans Moser; Paul Hörbiger
- Cinematography: Willy Winterstein
- Edited by: Alice Ludwig
- Music by: Bruno Uher
- Production companies: Wien-Film; Styria-Film
- Distributed by: Terra Film
- Release date: 8 August 1940
- Running time: 100 minutes
- Country: Austria (Part of Greater Germany)
- Language: German

Vienna Tales (German: Wiener G'schichten) is a 1940 musical comedy film directed by Géza von Bolváry and starring Marte Harell, Olly Holzmann, and Hans Moser. The film is set in Imperial Vienna at the beginning of the twentieth century. The film's sets were designed by Hans Ledersteger and Ernst Richter.

== Cast ==
- Marte Harell as Christine Lechner
- Olly Holzmann as Mizzi
- Hans Moser as Josef
- Paul Hörbiger as Ferdinand
- Hedwig Bleibtreu as Baronin Neudegg
- Siegfried Breuer as Egon von Brelowsky
- Fritz Diestel as Kaffeehauskoch
- Lola Hübner as Mathilde
- Fritz Imhoff as Grünberger
- Gisela Kolbe as Baronin Redwitz
- Anita Koller as Küchenmädchen
- Alfred Neugebauer as Horat Kümmler
- Hans Olden as Graf Riedl-Steinbach
- Hans Schott-Schöbinger as Fritz Seidl
- Oskar Sima as Stangelberger
- Egon von Jordan as Carlo

== Bibliography ==
- Hake, Sabine (2001). Popular Cinema of the Third Reich. Austin: University of Texas Press. ISBN 978-0-292-73458-6.
