= Come Back (film) =

1953 film

- Winnie Markus and Rudolf Prack
- Directed by: Alfred Braun
- Written by: Wolf Neumeister
- Produced by: Max G. Hüske
- Starring: Winnie Markus; Rudolf Prack; Hans Stüwe
- Cinematography: Bruno Stephan
- Edited by: Erwin Marno
- Music by: Robert Stolz; Herbert Trantow
- Production company: Diana-Film
- Distributed by: Gloria Film
- Release date: 4 December 1953
- Running time: 92 minutes
- Country: West Germany
- Language: German

Come Back (German: Komm zurück) is a 1953 West German drama film directed by Alfred Braun and starring Winnie Markus, Rudolf Prack and Hans Stüwe. It was shot at the Bendestorf and Wandsbek Studios in Hamburg. Location shooting took place around Stade and on the Rhine. The film's sets were designed by the art directors Hans Ledersteger, Ernst Richter and Hans Richter.

== Cast ==
- Winnie Markus as Sabine Viborg
- Rudolf Prack as Martin Larsen
- Hans Stüwe as Konrad Frisius
- Rasma Ducat as Titine Clomord-Singer
- Joachim Rake as Gert Hassler
- Margreth Meier-Wolters as Frau Muthesius
- Alfred Braun as Vokrodt
- Helmut Gmelin as Danehl
- Eva Fiebig as Fräulein Kranboer
- Carl Voscherau as Bloom
- Etta Braun as Marguerite
- Teddy Turai as La Chaussee
- Kurt Fuß as Franz Zollinspektor
- Axel Monjé

== Bibliography ==
- Bock, Hans-Michael & Bergfelder, Tim. The Concise CineGraph. Encyclopedia of German Cinema. Berghahn Books, 2009.
