= And Who Is Kissing Me? (1956 film) =

1956 film

- Directed by: Max Nosseck
- Written by: Louis Agotay; Karl Farkas; Franz Gribitz; Max Nosseck
- Produced by: Herbert Sennewald
- Starring: Hans Moser; Grethe Weiser; Theo Lingen; Johannes Heesters
- Cinematography: Georg Bruckbauer
- Edited by: Hermine Diethelm
- Music by: Gerhard Bronner
- Production company: Cosmopol-Film
- Distributed by: Cosmopol-Film; Allianz Filmverleih (West Germany)
- Release date: 20 March 1956
- Running time: 90 minutes
- Country: Austria
- Language: German

And Who Is Kissing Me? (German: ...und wer küßt mich?) is a 1956 Austrian comedy film directed by Max Nosseck and starring Hans Moser, Grethe Weiser, Theo Lingen and Johannes Heesters, who each play themselves. The film's sets were designed by the art director Felix Smetana. Location shooting took place in Vienna. It is not a remake of the 1933 German film And Who Is Kissing Me?. The film is also known by the alternative title Ein Herz und eine Seele.

== Synopsis ==
A newspaper organising a charity ball secures the assistance of four veteran comic performers. They agree to be raffled off for an evening, and each enjoys very different adventures.

== Cast ==
- Hans Moser as Hans Moser
- Grethe Weiser as Grethe Weiser
- Theo Lingen as Theo Lingen
- Johannes Heesters as Johannes Heesters
- Gunther Philipp as Psychiater Dr. Gunther Philipp
- Wolf Albach-Retty as Lindner
- Paul Hörbiger as Bauer
- Waltraut Haas as Christine Bauer
- Susi Nicoletti as Kitty Lindner
- Rudolf Lenz as Rudolf Herbst
- Erni Mangold as Liane Neubert
- Rudolf Carl as Kreisser
- Heinz Conrads as Robert
- Lotte Lang as Emma Lehmbruck
- Fritz Imhoff as Hotelportier Habertitzl
- Ernst Waldbrunn as Herold Conférencier
- Franz Böheim as Dr. Scholle
- Hans Thimig as Paul Eckert
- Richard Eybner as Prof. Hecht
- Guido Wieland as Mimi, ein Zuhälter
- Raoul Retzer as Kesson Filmregisseur
- Eva Kerbler as Schwester Inge
- Cissy Kraner as Cabaret Singer
- Ady Berber as Boxer
- Liane Augustin as Singer

== Bibliography ==
- Trimborn, Jürgen. Der Herr im Frack, Johannes Heesters: Biographie. Aufbau-Verlag, 2003.
- Weinmann, Beatrice. Waltraut Haas: Biografie. Residenz-Verlag, 2007.
