= Kissing Is No Sin (1950 film) =

1950 Austrian-German comedy film

- Curd Jürgens, Erika von Thellmann and Hans Olden
- Directed by: Hubert Marischka
- Written by: Ignaz Schnitzer (libretto Bruder Straubinger); Moritz West (libretto Bruder Straubinger); Rudolf Österreicher; Hubert Marischka
- Starring: Curd Jürgens; Hans Olden; Hans Moser
- Cinematography: Josef Illig; Franz Koch
- Edited by: Adolf Schlyssleder
- Music by: Alois Melichar
- Production companies: Aco-Film; Schönbrunn-Film
- Distributed by: Union Film
- Release date: 28 September 1950
- Running time: 107 minutes
- Countries: Austria; West Germany
- Language: German

Kissing Is No Sin (German: Küssen ist keine Sünd) is a 1950 Austrian-German comedy film directed by Hubert Marischka and starring Curd Jürgens, Hans Olden and Hans Moser. The film takes its title from the waltz "Küssen ist keine Sünd" in Edmund Eysler's 1903 operetta Bruder Straubinger and features the song in its soundtrack.

It was shot at the Bavaria Studios in Munich and on location in Salzburg. The film's sets were designed by the art director Hans Ledersteger and Ernst Richter.

== Cast ==
- Curd Jürgens as Kammersänger, Felix Alberti
- Hans Olden as Ferdinand Schwaighofer, sein Impresario
- Hans Moser as Alois Eder, Gastwirt zur 'Goldenen Gans'
- Erika von Thellmann as Anastasia, seine Frau
- Elfie Mayerhofer as Tilly, deren Tochter
- Adolf Gondrell as Generaldirektor Steinberger
- Gisela Fackeldey as Mara, seine Freundin
- Hans Leibelt
- Theodor Danegger
- Max Schipper as Leopold, Gastwirt
- Gertrud Wolle as Hildegard
- Hélène Robert as Kathi
- Axel Scholtz as Kellnerjunge, Eduard
- Rudolf Schündler
- Hugo Gottschlich
- Hans Hais
- Paul Mahr
- Thea Aichbichler
- Richard Bender
- Rita Rechenberg
- Heinz Beck
- Franz Loskarn
- Rolf Pinegger
- Wastl Witt
- Herbert Hübner as Christian Reinecke, Oberlehrer

== Bibliography ==
- Robert von Dassanowsky. Austrian Cinema: A History. McFarland, 2005.
