= The Cat in the Bag (1935 film) =

1935 film directed by Richard Eichberg

- Directed by: Richard Eichberg
- Written by: Jan Fethke
- Based on: Zsákbamacska by Mihály Eisemann and László Szilágyi
- Produced by: Pierre O'Connell; Willy Melas
- Starring: Magda Schneider; Wolf Albach-Retty; Theo Lingen
- Cinematography: Karl Hasselmann
- Music by: Hans Sommer
- Production company: Societé Internationale Cinématographique
- Distributed by: Neue Deutsch Lichtspiel-Syndikat
- Release date: 23 January 1935
- Running time: 91 minutes
- Countries: France; Germany
- Language: German

The Cat in the Bag (German: Die Katz' im Sack) is a 1935 French-German comedy film directed by Richard Eichberg and starring Magda Schneider, Wolf Albach-Retty, Julia Serda and Theo Lingen. It was shot at the Epinay Studios of Tobis Film in Paris and on location around the city and on the French Riviera. The film's sets were designed by the art director Peeter Linzbach. A separate French-language version, Quadrille d'amour, was produced.

== Cast ==
- Magda Schneider as Irene Ferenczy
- Julia Serda as Eugenie, ihre Mutter, Gutsbesitzerin
- Theo Lingen as Tiwi Dollin, ihr Vetter
- Wolf Albach-Retty as Edmund Vernon, Rennfahrer
- Otto Daue as Bob, Edmunds Sportkamerad
- Günther Vogdt as Karl, Edmunds Sportkamerad
- Robert Thiem as Richard, Edmunds Sportkamerad
- Tina Eilers as Suzy Martin
- Hubert von Meyerinck as Louis Grevenelle
- Egon Brosig as Dr. Brentano, Sekretär des Sportsklubs in Monte Carlo

== Bibliography ==
- Klaus, Ulrich J. Deutsche Tonfilme: Jahrgang 1935. Klaus-Archiv, 1988.
- Kreimeier, Klaus. The Ufa Story: A History of Germany's Greatest Film Company, 1918-1945. University of California Press, 1999.
- Wedel, Michael. Kolportage, Kitsch und Können: Das Kino des Richard Eichberg. CineGraph Babelsberg, 2007.
