= My Aunt, Your Aunt (1939 film) =

1939 film directed by Carl Boese

- Johannes Heesters and Olly Holzmann
- Directed by: Carl Boese
- Written by: Kurt Bortfeldt; Ralph Arthur Roberts
- Produced by: Dietrich von Theobald
- Starring: Ralph Arthur Roberts; Johannes Heesters; Olly Holzmann
- Cinematography: Franz Weihmayr
- Edited by: Hilde Grebner
- Music by: Werner Bochmann
- Production company: UFA
- Distributed by: UFA
- Release date: 28 December 1939
- Running time: 89 minutes
- Country: Germany
- Language: German

My Aunt, Your Aunt (German: Meine Tante – deine Tante) is a 1939 German comedy film directed by Carl Boese and starring Ralph Arthur Roberts, Johannes Heesters, and Olly Holzmann. It was shot at the Babelsberg Studios in Berlin. The film's sets were designed by the art director Ernst H. Albrecht. Boese later directed a 1956 film of the same title.

== Cast ==
- Ralph Arthur Roberts as Theodor Baron von Bredebosch
- Johannes Heesters as Peter Larisch
- Olly Holzmann as Tony Köster
- Walter Lieck as Apotheker Klein
- Ernst Legal as Amtmann Henkel
- Kate Kühl as Doris Köster
- Eduard Wenck as Dr. Köhler
- Walter Ladengast as Rudolf Trautmann
- Lotte Rausch as Frau Trautmann
- Valy Arnheim as Diener Johann
- Leo Peukert as Parkwächter Buntschuh
- Eva Tinschmann as Vermieterin Frau Schnabel
- Ursula Deinert
- Karl Etlinger
- Hildegard Fränzel
- Harry Hardt
- Fred Becker
- Wilhelm Bendow
- Franz Stein

== Bibliography ==
- Bock, Hans-Michael; Bergfelder, Tim, eds. (2009). The Concise Cinegraph: Encyclopaedia of German Cinema. New York: Berghahn Books. ISBN 978-1-57181-655-9.
