= Hans Gustl Kernmayr =

Austrian writer

- Born: 10 February 1900; Graz, Styria, Austro-Hungarian Empire
- Died: 9 October 1977 (aged 77); Prien am Chiemsee, Bavaria, West Germany
- Other name: Johann Gustav Kernmayr
- Occupation: Writer
- Years active: 1934-1964 (film & TV)

Hans Gustl Kernmayr (1900–1977) was an Austrian novelist and screenwriter. He was active in Austrian cinema in the 1930s. A committed Nazi he worked as a propagandist for the cause. In 1941 he was commissioned by general Heinz Guderian to write a flattering biography of him, although due to the objection's of Guderian's wife Margarete it was never published.

== Selected filmography ==
- I for You, You for Me (1934)
- A Night on the Danube (1935)
- The Missing Wife (1937)
- Musik für dich (1937)
- Flower of the Tisza (1939)
- Between River and Steppe (1939)
- Donauschiffer (1940)
- Vienna Tales (1940)
- Thrice Wed (1941)
- To Be God One Time (1942)
- The Degenhardts (1944)
- Schrammeln (1944)
- Archduke Johann's Great Love (1950)
- Regimental Music (1950)
- Wedding in the Hay (1951)
- Vienna Waltzes (1951)
- Operation Edelweiss (1954)
- Kleren Maken de Man (1957)

== Bibliography ==
- Silverman, Lisa. The Postwar Antisemite: Culture and Complicity After the Holocaust. Oxford University Press, 2025.
- Stahel, David. Hitler's Panzer Generals: Guderian, Hoepner, Reinhardt and Schmidt Unguarded. Cambridge University Press, 2023.
- Von Dassanowsky, Robert. Screening Transcendence: Film Under Austrofascism and the Hollywood Hope, 1933-1938. Indiana University Press, 2018
