= Winter Night's Dream =

1935 film directed by Géza von Bolváry

- Directed by: Géza von Bolváry
- Written by: Ernst Marischka
- Produced by: Eduard Kubat
- Starring: Magda Schneider; Wolf Albach-Retty; Richard Romanowsky
- Cinematography: Werner Brandes
- Edited by: Hermann Haller
- Music by: Franz Grothe
- Production company: Boston Film
- Release date: 13 February 1935
- Running time: 80 minutes
- Country: Germany
- Language: German

Winter Night's Dream (German: Winternachtstraum) is a 1935 German romantic comedy film directed by Géza von Bolváry and starring Magda Schneider, Wolf Albach-Retty, and Richard Romanowsky. It was shot at the Johannisthal Studios in Berlin and on location at the resort town of Garmisch-Partenkirchen in Bavaria. The film's sets were designed by the art director Emil Hasler.

== Synopsis ==
While accompanying her employer to a resort, a secretary falls in love with a ski instructor.

== Cast ==
- Magda Schneider as Hilde Müller
- Wolf Albach-Retty as Peter Kreutzberg
- Richard Romanowsky as Romuald Bönecke
- Hans Moser as Leopold Prinz
- Theo Lingen as Kautz
- Walter Steinbeck as Schuhmann
- Hubert von Meyerinck as Degenfels
- Erik Ode
- Hans Junkermann
- Gustav Waldau
- Hedda Björnson
- Carl Walther Meyer
- Hans Henninger

== See also ==
- Frk. Møllers jubilæum (1937)
- Julia jubilerar (1938)

== Bibliography ==
- Waldman, Harry (2008). Nazi Films in America, 1933–1942. Jefferson, North Carolina: McFarland. ISBN 978-0-7864-3861-7.
