= Heaven on Earth (1935 film) =

1935 film

- Directed by: E. W. Emo
- Written by: Julius Horst (play); Georg Zoch
- Produced by: Oskar Glück
- Starring: Lizzi Holzschuh; Ilona Massey; Heinz Rühmann
- Cinematography: Eduard Hoesch; Bruno Timm
- Music by: Robert Stolz
- Production company: Projektograph Film Oskar Gluck
- Distributed by: Kiba Kinobetriebsanstalt
- Release date: 21 March 1935
- Running time: 90 minutes
- Country: Austria
- Language: German

Heaven on Earth (German: Der Himmel auf Erden) is a 1935 Austrian musical comedy film directed by E. W. Emo and starring Lizzi Holzschuh, Ilona Massey, and Heinz Rühmann.

It was shot at the Rosenhügel Studios in Vienna. The film's sets were designed by the art director Julius von Borsody.

== Cast ==
- Lizzi Holzschuh as Hansi Adlgasser
- Ilona Massey as Operettendiva Fioritta
- Heinz Rühmann as Peter Hilpert
- Hermann Thimig as Komponist Paul Heller
- Hans Moser as Gasthofbesitzer Adlgasser
- Theo Lingen as Theaterdirektor Platzer
- Adele Sandrock as Tante Adele
- Rudolf Carl as Diener Otto
- Julia Janssen as Erna von Wippritz
- Alfred Neugebauer as Erna von Wippritz' Vater
- Johannes Roth as Sekretär des Theaterdirektors

== Bibliography ==
- Bock, Hans-Michael; Bergfelder, Tim, eds. (2009). The Concise Cinegraph: Encyclopaedia of German Cinema. New York: Berghahn Books. ISBN 978-1-57181-655-9.
