= Lotte Rausch =

German actress

- Born: 24 May 1913; Cologne, German Empire
- Died: 11 March 1995 (aged 81); Offenbach am Main, Germany
- Other name: Charlotte Bach
- Occupation: Actress
- Years active: 1936-1967 (film)

Lotte Rausch (24 May 1913 – 11 March 1995) was a German stage and film actress.

== Selected filmography ==
- If We All Were Angels (1936)
- The Broken Jug (1937)
- The Ways of Love Are Strange (1937)
- Triad (1938)
- Women for Golden Hill (1938)
- Northern Lights (1938)
- Bachelor's Paradise (1939)
- New Year's Eve on Alexanderplatz (1939)
- My Aunt, Your Aunt (1939)
- Wibbel the Tailor (1939)
- Police Report (1939)
- Twilight (1940)
- Her Private Secretary (1940)
- Alarm (1941)
- Rembrandt (1942)
- The Old Boss (1942)
- Journey into the Past (1943)
- A Waltz with You (1943)
- A Flea in Her Ear (1943)
- Love Letters (1944)
- A Cheerful House (1944)
- Thirteen Under One Hat (1950)
- The Lost One (1951)
- A Thousand Red Roses Bloom (1952)
- Three Days of Fear (1952)
- Rose of the Mountain (1952)
- The Bachelor Trap (1953)
- The Spanish Fly (1955)
- Father's Day (1955)
- Where the Ancient Forests Rustle (1956)
- The Legs of Dolores (1957)
- Widower with Five Daughters (1957)
- The Muzzle (1958)
- I Learned That in Paris (1960)

== Bibliography ==
- Youngkin, Stephen. The Lost One: A Life of Peter Lorre. University Press of Kentucky, 2005.
