= Johann (film) =

1943 film directed by Robert A. Stemmle

- Directed by: Robert A. Stemmle
- Written by: Franz Gribitz; Robert A. Stemmle; Ernst von Salomon
- Produced by: Ernst Rechenmacher
- Starring: Theo Lingen; Fita Benkhoff; Irene von Meyendorff.
- Narrated by: Johann by Theo Lingen
- Cinematography: Erich Claunigk; Heinz Schnackertz
- Edited by: Hermann Haller
- Music by: Werner Bochmann
- Production company: Bavaria Film
- Distributed by: Deutsche Filmvertriebs
- Release date: 3 December 1943
- Running time: 75 minutes
- Country: Germany
- Language: German

Johann is a 1943 German comedy film directed by Robert A. Stemmle and starring Theo Lingen, Fita Benkhoff and Irene von Meyendorff. It was based on the play of the same title by Lingen. It was shot at the Bavaria Studios in Munich and the Hostivar Studios in Prague and on location around Salzburg. The film's sets were designed by the art directors Herbert Nitzschke and Max Seefelder.

== Cast ==
- Theo Lingen as Kammerdiener Johann Schmidt/Bauunternehmer Hans Pietschmann
- Fita Benkhoff as Marie Pietschmann
- Irene von Meyendorff as Uschi von Zirndorf
- Hermann Thimig as Graf von Zirndorf
- Hilde Seipp as Gräfin Alice von Heiningen
- Arthur Schröder as Graf Udo Bodo von Heiningen
- Herbert Hübner as Direktor Schupfelhuber
- Josef Eichheim as Balthasar
- Nicolas Koline as Baron Rebus
- Leopold von Ledebur as Onkel Theobald

== Bibliography ==
- Bock, Hans-Michael & Bergfelder, Tim. The Concise CineGraph. Encyclopedia of German Cinema. Berghahn Books, 2009.
- Moeller, Felix. The Film Minister: Goebbels and the Cinema in the Third Reich. Edition Axel Menges, 2000.
