= My Aunt, Your Aunt (1956 film) =

1956 film directed by Carl Boese

- Directed by: Carl Boese
- Written by: Johann Alexander Hübler-Kahla; Bobby E. Lüthge
- Produced by: Johann Alexander Hübler-Kahla
- Starring: Theo Lingen; Hans Moser; Georg Thomalla
- Cinematography: Bruno Stephan
- Edited by: Jutta Hering
- Music by: Frank Filip
- Production company: Hübler-Kahla Film
- Distributed by: Gloria Film
- Release date: 7 September 1956
- Running time: 99 minutes
- Country: West Germany
- Language: German

My Aunt, Your Aunt (German: Meine Tante, deine Tante) is a 1956 West German comedy crime film directed by Carl Boese and starring Theo Lingen, Hans Moser and Georg Thomalla. Boese had previously made a 1939 film of the same title. It was shot in Agfacolor at the Bavaria Studios in Munich. The film's sets were designed by the art directors Hertha Hareiter and Otto Pischinger.

== Cast ==
- Theo Lingen as Theo Müller
- Hans Moser as Hans Gippner
- Georg Thomalla as Tommy Schneider
- Oskar Sima as Oscar Starwasser
- Fritz Imhoff as Anthropologist
- Harry Fuß as Harry Schröder
- Ethel Reschke as Lola, cabaret artiste
- Gerty Godden as Lotte
- Sabine Bethmann as Helga
- Rolf Olsen as Anthropologist
- Ernst Braaso
- Hans Hansen
- Paul Heidemann as Bankdirektor Kretschmer
- Helga Martin as Frieda
- Hans Hermann Schaufuß as Der alte Berger

== Bibliography ==
- Hans-Michael Bock and Tim Bergfelder. The Concise Cinegraph: An Encyclopedia of German Cinema. Berghahn Books, 2009.
