= Voice of the Heart (film) =

(1942 film

- Directed by: Johannes Meyer
- Written by: Gerhard T. Buchholz; Georg Hurdalek
- Based on: Francesca da Rimin by Ernst von Wildenbruch
- Produced by: Otto Ernst Lubitz
- Starring: Marianne Hoppe; Ernst von Klipstein; Carl Kuhlmann
- Cinematography: Karl Hasselmann
- Edited by: Johanna Schmidt
- Music by: Frank Fox
- Production company: Berlin Film
- Distributed by: Deutsche Filmvertriebs
- Release date: 27 October 1942
- Running time: 88 minutes
- Country: Germany
- Language: German

Voice of the Heart (German: Stimme des Herzens) is a 1942 German drama film directed by Johannes Meyer and starring Marianne Hoppe, Ernst von Klipstein and Carl Kuhlmann. It was shot at the Cinetone Studios in Amsterdam and the Filmstad in The Hague, both in the German-occupied Netherlands. The film's sets were designed by the art directors Hans Ledersteger and Ernst Richter.

== Cast ==
- Marianne Hoppe as Felicitas Iversen
- Ernst von Klipstein as Paul Ohlsen
- Carl Kuhlmann as Senator Iversen
- Eugen Klöpfer as Vater Wendland
- Fritz Odemar as Dr. Overhoff
- Carsta Löck as Sophie
- Franz Schafheitlin as Direktor Möller
- Herbert Hübner as Senator Bulthaupt
- Roma Bahn as Frau Bulthaupt
- Albert Florath as Reeder Lenius
- Heinrich Marlow as Senator Kröger
- Elga Brink as Frau Kröger
- Karl Schönböck as Volontär Benthien
- Peter Elsholtz as Volontär Bolten
- Curd Jürgens as Volontär Drews
- Ernst Waldow as Lohndiener Fischmann
- Hertha von Walther as Elisabeth

== Bibliography ==
- Klaus, Ulrich J. Deutsche Tonfilme: Jahrgang 1938. Klaus-Archiv, 1988.
- Romani, Cinzia. Tainted Goddesses : Female Film Stars of the Third Reich. Da Capo Press, 1992.
