= Dog Days (1944 film) =

1944 film

- Directed by: Géza von Cziffra
- Written by: Géza von Cziffra
- Produced by: Willi Forst; Karl Hartl; Hans Somborn
- Starring: Wolf Albach-Retty; Rolf Wanka; Maria Holst; Olly Holzmann
- Cinematography: Jan Stallich
- Edited by: Hans Wolff
- Music by: Anton Profes
- Production companies: Deutsche Forst-Filmproduktion; Wien-Film
- Distributed by: Deutsche Filmvertriebs
- Release date: 4 August 1944
- Running time: 89 minutes
- Country: Germany
- Language: German

Dog Days (German: Hundstage) is a 1944 German comedy film directed by Géza von Cziffra and starring Wolf Albach-Retty, Rolf Wanka, Maria Holst and Olly Holzmann. It was shot at the Barrandov Studios in Prague. The film's sets were designed by the art director Julius von Borsody. It was co-produced by the Vienna-based Wien Film, which had been set up when Austria was annexed by Nazi Germany during the 1938 Anschluss.

== Synopsis ==
Paul and Peter are two old friends, both dentists, who run into each other after a number of years. Peter gets Paul to cover his practice while he goes away on his honeymoon with his assistant Ingeborg. Confusing matters, Paul falls for Ingeborg when Peter shows an interest in the attractive ice skater Gerti.

== Cast ==
- Wolf Albach-Retty as Dr. Paul Wendler
- Rolf Wanka as Dr. Peter Kirchner
- Maria Holst as Ingeborg Kirchner
- Olly Holzmann as Gerti König
- Wilma Tatzel as Susi Mottel
- Walter Lieck as Abteilungsleiter Reinhold
- Karl Günther as Kommerzienrat Riebling
- Marlise Ludwig as Luise Riebling
- Grethe Weiser as Valerie Seidel
- Sonja Ziemann as Marion Seidel
- Fritz Odemar as Generaldirektor Behring
- Victor Janson as Wenig
- Ernst G. Schiffner as Klavierhändler
- Otto Stoeckel as Hoteldirektor Salvatini
- Jenny Liese as Auguste Kirchner
- Lucie Bittrich as Fräulein Gießkandl
- Gaby Gardner as Dr. Kirchners Empfangsdame
- Alfred Neugebauer as Gertis Vater

== Bibliography ==
- Klaus, Ulrich J. Deutsche Tonfilme: Volume 13. Klaus-Archiv, 1988.
- Von Dassanowsky, Robert. Austrian Cinema: A History. McFarland, 2005.
