= Ave Maria (1953 film) =

1953 film

- Directed by: Alfred Braun
- Written by: Harald Braun; Wolf Neumeister; Hans Wendel
- Produced by: Ilse Kubaschewski; Walter Traut
- Starring: Zarah Leander; Hans Stüwe; Marianne Hold
- Cinematography: Hans Graf; Werner Krien
- Edited by: Erwin Marno
- Music by: Franz Grothe
- Production company: Divina-Film
- Distributed by: Gloria Film
- Release date: 8 September 1953
- Running time: 95 minutes
- Country: West Germany
- Language: German

Ave Maria is a 1953 West German drama film directed by Alfred Braun and starring Zarah Leander, Hans Stüwe and Marianne Hold. It was part of the post-war comeback of Swedish-born Leander who had been one of the biggest German stars of the Nazi era.

The film's sets were designed by the art directors Hans Ledersteger and Ernst Richter. It was made at the Bavaria Studios in Munich. Location filming took place in Hamburg, Finland and the Starnberger See.

== Cast ==
- Zarah Leander as Karin Twerdy aka Maria Talland
- Hans Stüwe as Dietrich Gontard
- Marianne Hold as Daniela Twerdy
- Hilde Körber as Schwester Benedikta
- Carl Wery as Dr. Melartin
- Ingrid Pan as Christa Gontard
- Hans Henn as Thomas Gontard
- Hedwig Wangel as Die Oberin
- Charlotte Scheier-Herold as Schwester Luitgard
- Ernst Stahl-Nachbaur as Dr. Rieser
- Josef Sieber as Conny
- Hans Stiebner as Hanke
- Berta Drews as Kerstin Melartin
- Elisabeth Wendt as Lisa Nilsson
- Etta Braun as Selma
- Zita Uhl as Schwester Beata
- Ingeborg von Freyberg as Schwester Gundula
- Alfred Braun
- Nikolaus Ellin
- Maria Offermanns
- Bertha Picard as Schwester Ursula
- Ernst Rotmund
- Elisabeth Wardt

== Bibliography ==
- Bock, Hans-Michael & Bergfelder, Tim. The Concise CineGraph. Encyclopedia of German Cinema. Berghahn Books, 2009.
