= Alfred Braun =

German director, writer and actor (1888–1978)

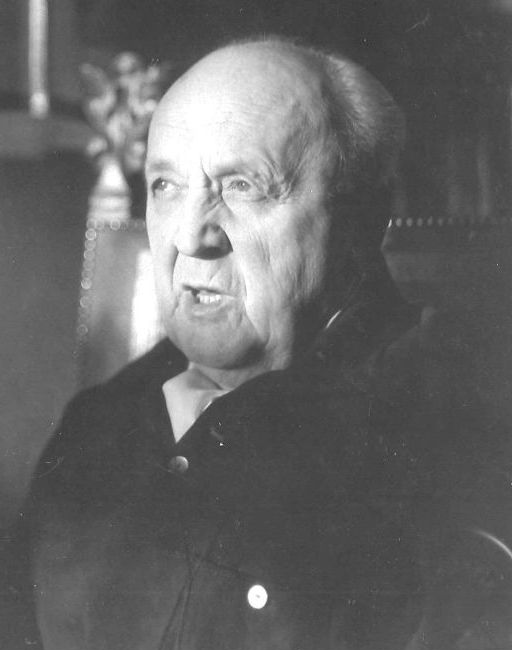
- Braun c. 1975
- Born: 3 May 1888; Berlin, German Empire
- Died: 3 January 1978 (aged 89); West Berlin, West Germany
- Occupations: Director, actor, screenwriter
- Years active: 1920–1967

Alfred Braun (3 May 1888 – 3 January 1978) was a pioneer of German radio. He became famous as a radio reporter and radio play director, among other things. He was also an actor, stage and film director, and screenwriter.

Although he was arrested by the Gestapo in 1933, he was released and then emigrated to Switzerland and Türkiye. He returned to Berlin in 1939, and in 1940 he worked on the antisemitic propaganda film Jud Süß as assistant-director. He then wrote several screenplays in partnership with Veit Harlan during the Nazi Regime.

== Filmography ==
=== Actor ===
- Das Leid der Liebe (1916)
- Der Sohn der Magd (1919)
- The Gambler (1920) - Stöckel
- Rosenmontag (1924)
- The Enchantress (1924)
- Das sonnige Märchen vom Glück (1924) - Dr. Ing. Waldemar Hassenstein
- Radio Magic (1927) - Sprecher des Berliner Rundfunks
- Flachsmann the Educator (1930) - Jan Flemming
- Tingel-Tangel (1930)
- Spione im Savoy-Hotel (1932) - Alfred Braun, der rasende Reporter
- Große Freiheit Nr. 7 (1944) - Rundfunkreporter
- Chemistry and Love (1948) - Narrator
- Anonymous Letters (1949) - Dr. Maurin
- The Staircase (1950) - Kriminalkommissar
- Primanerinnen (1951) - Herr Lullus
- When the Evening Bells Ring (1951)
- Komm zurück... (1953) - Vokrodt
- Ave Maria (1953)
- Scotland Yard Hunts Dr. Mabuse (1963)

=== Director ===
- Girls Behind Bars (1949)
- The Staircase (1950)
- A Rare Lover (1950)
- Eyes of Love (1951)
- When the Evening Bells Ring (1951)
- A Thousand Red Roses Bloom (1952)
- Ave Maria (1953)
- Come Back (1953)
- Stresemann (1957)
- Schwarze Nylons – Heiße Nächte (1958)
- Morgen wirst du um mich weinen (1959)

=== Screenwriter ===
- The Golden City (1941, with Veit Harlan)
- Immensee (1943, with Veit Harlan)
- Opfergang (1944, with Veit Harlan)
- Kolberg (1945, with Veit Harlan and Josef Goebbels (uncredited))
- The Death of a Double (1967)

== Bibliography ==
- Fox, Jo. Film Propaganda in Britain and Nazi Germany: World War II Cinema. Berg, 2007.
