= Ernst Haeussermann =

Austrian theatre director and actor (1916–1984)

- Born: 3 June 1916; Leipzig, German Empire
- Died: 11 June 1984 (aged 68); Vienna, Austria
- Other names: Ernst Häussermann; Ernst Hausman
- Occupations: Actor theatre director
- Years active: 1934–1943 (film)

Ernst Haeussermann (3 June 1916 – 11 June 1984) was a German-born Austrian theatre director and actor. Haeussermann was the son of the actor Reinhold Häussermann. Because of his Jewish origins, he was forced to flee Austria after the Anschluss of 1938. He settled in the United States, and appeared in small roles in several Hollywood productions. He returned to Austria after the war, and he worked in the country's most prominent theatres. He was married twice: first to Johanna Lothar, a fellow émigré he met in America and later to the actress Susi Nicoletti.

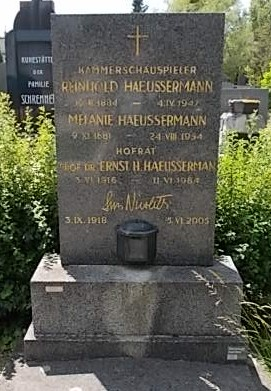
Gravesite of Ernst Haeussermann at Döbling Cemetery in Vienna

== Filmography ==
=== Actor ===
Year	Title	Role	Notes
1934	A Star Fell from Heaven		
1935	Címzett ismeretlen	Toni	
1940	The Story of Dr. Ehrlich's Magic Bullet	Hans Weisgart	Uncredited
1940	Four Sons	Schmitt	
1940	This Man Reuter	Heinrich	Uncredited
1941	Underground	Rudi	Uncredited
1942	The Pied Piper	Soldier	Uncredited
1942	Secret Enemies	Second Bellhop	Uncredited
1942	Once Upon a Honeymoon	German Getting Film from Le Blanc	Uncredited
1943	Chetniks	German Corporal	
1943	The Moon Is Down	Moeller	Uncredited
1943	Tonight We Raid Calais	Young Nazi Guard	Uncredited
1943	Mission to Moscow	Ship's Steward	
1943	Action in the North Atlantic	German	Uncredited
1943	Hitler's Madman	Sentry	Uncredited
1943	Background to Danger	Clerk	Uncredited
1943	Hostages	Orderly in Patzer's Office	Uncredited

=== Director ===
Year	Title	Notes
1974	Fräulein Else	
1979	A Far Country	a.k.a. Berggasse 19

== Bibliography ==
- Weniger, Kay. 'Es wird im Leben dir mehr genommen als gegeben ...' Lexikon der aus Deutschland und Österreich emigrierten Filmschaffenden 1933 bis 1945. ACABUS Verlag, 2011.
