= Fräulein Veronika =

- Directed by: Veit Harlan
- Written by: Fritz Peter Buch (play); Axel Eggebrecht
- Produced by: Moritz Grünstein; Ernst Schmid-Arens
- Starring: Thekla Ahrens; Carl Esmond; Hans Moser; Theo Lingen
- Cinematography: István Eiben
- Edited by: Viktor Bánky
- Music by: Will Meisel
- Production company: Berna-Filmproduktion
- Release date: 21 August 1936
- Running time: 81 minutes
- Countries: Austria; Switzerland
- Language: German

Fräulein Veronika is a 1936 Austrian-Swiss comedy film directed by Veit Harlan and starring Thekla Ahrens, Carl Esmond and Hans Moser. It is based on the play Veronika by Fritz Peter Buch. The film is sometimes known by the alternative title Alles für Veronika. It was shot at the Hunnia Studios in Budapest. It premiered in Vienna in August 1936, then opened in Munich in December, and Berlin in February 1937.

== Main cast ==
- Thekla Ahrens - Veronika Sonntag
- Carl Esmond - Paul Schmidt
- Hans Moser - Direktor Tutzinger
- Theo Lingen - Abteilungschef Fuchs
- Walter Janssen - Abteilungschef Wolf
- Grethe Weiser - Annie Hegemann
- Gretl Theimer - Lizzie
- Hilde Hildebrand - Dora
- Hubert von Meyerinck - Theo
- Clemens Hasse - Hausdetektiv Krüger
- Paul Beckers - Portier Kulicke
- Ilse Fürstenberg - Frau Kulicke
- Georg Erich Schmidt - Pickelberg
- Hilli Wildenhain - Hänschen
