= The Jumping Jack (1938 film) =

1938 film directed by Karlheinz Martin

- Directed by: Karlheinz Martin
- Written by: Gerhard T. Buchholz; Wilhelm Krug; Julius Sandmeier
- Based on: Novella by Otto Bielen
- Produced by: Heinrich Haas
- Starring: Hilde Krahl; Wolf Albach-Retty; Lotte Lang
- Cinematography: Oskar Schnirch
- Edited by: Hans Wolff
- Music by: Hans Lang; Josef Petrak
- Production company: Styria Film
- Distributed by: Tobis Film
- Release date: 27 October 1938
- Running time: 80 minutes
- Country: Germany
- Language: German

The Jumping Jack (German: Der Hampelmann) is a 1938 German comedy film directed by Karlheinz Martin and starring Hilde Krahl, Wolf Albach-Retty and Lotte Lang. It was shot at the Rosenhügel Studios in Vienna and on location around the city and in Attersee. The film's sets were designed by the art director Hans Ledersteger. Produced in Austria, it was released in cinemas several months after the country had been incorporated into Greater Germany during the Anschluss.

== Cast ==
- Hilde Krahl as Steffi
- Wolf Albach-Retty as Paul Oertel
- Lotte Lang as Elisabeth
- Philip Dorn as Peter
- Anton Edthofer as Nikolaus Rohr
- Annie Rosar as Maria Mürz

== Bibliography ==
- Klaus, Ulrich J. Deutsche Tonfilme: Jahrgang 1938. Klaus-Archiv, 1988.
- Fritz, Walter. Die österreichischen Spielfilme der Tonfilmzeit (1929-1938). Österreichisches Filmarchiv, 1968.
- Von Dassanowsky, Robert. Screening Transcendence: Film Under Austrofascism and the Hollywood Hope, 1933-1938. Indiana University Press, 2018
