= The Secret of Cavelli =

1934 film

- Directed by: Erich Engel
- Written by: Heinrich Oberländer
- Produced by: Reinhold Meissner, for ABC-Film, Tobis-Sascha
- Starring: Rudolf Forster; Angela Salloker
- Cinematography: Bruno Mondi
- Edited by: Else Baum
- Music by: Willy Schmidt-Gentner
- Distributed by: Neues Deutsches Lichtspiel-Syndikat (N.D.L.S.), Berlin; Huschak & Co, Vienna
- Release dates: 31 December 1934 (Munich); 24 January 1935 (Berlin); 6 February 1935 (Vienna)
- Running time: 90 minutes
- Country: Austria
- Language: German

Hohe Schule, also known by its subtitle Das Geheimnis des Carlo Cavelli (English: The Secret of Cavelli) is a 1934 drama film directed by Erich Engel. The English-language version was released in the UK between 1935 and 1939, and in the US in 1939. An outstanding specimen of the genre of the Wiener Film, this story of love set in the Austrian officer classes was one of the most successful German-language film releases of 1935. The English-language version was released in the UK between 1935 and 1939, and in the US in 1939.

== Plot ==
"Carlo Cavelli" is the professional name of a world-famous dressage rider (Rudolf Forster), who always wears a mask in his public performances and whose real name is unknown. He is about to appear in Vienna, which causes a sensation. At the dressage competition he comes to the attention of Irene von Ketterer (Angela Salloker), a young woman who after a fight with her mother (Camilla Gerzhofer) has gone to stay with a friend. She is so impressed with him that she decides that she too will become a dressage rider. After a time the normally unapproachable Cavelli agrees to give her personal tuition. At first their relationship is very friendly, but when he discovers the name of his pupil, Cavelli attempts to distance himself from her. This is because his life was totally changed by a duel in which he shot and killed his best friend's son, Franz, Irene's brother (Paul von Hernried), an action the memory of which still tortures him. Nevertheless, after an interval, he acknowledges his great attraction to Irene and after establishing that his feelings for her are reciprocated, he decides to ask for her hand in marriage. At the same time, however, he also asks her to travel to London with him the very next day.

Irene enthusiastically accepts and goes to her father's to gather her papers. While she is there, she comes across a photograph of Cavelli with her brother. When she asks her father, General von Ketterer (Hans Homma), about it, he tells her the story of the duel in which Count Werffen, who later called himself Cavelli, killed her brother. When the general realises from what Irene says in her distress that this is the man who wants to marry her, he fetches his pistol in order to kill him. Only Irene's threat of suicide dissuades him.

Cavelli visits Irene's father that evening with three friends, who bring with them various documents from which it becomes clear that Irene's brother Franz had been unmasked as a spy and that Cavelli had only set up the duel to spare the von Ketterer family the shame of the otherwise inevitable court martial and execution. General von Ketterer accepts the truth of this and he and Cavelli are reconciled. The incriminating documents are burnt and the way stands open for Irene's marriage to Cavelli otherwise Count Werffen.

== Background ==
The premiere took place on 31 December 1934 in Munich. The film went on general release in Germany after the Berlin premiere in the Gloria-Palast on 24 January 1935 and in Austria after the Vienna premiere on 6 February 1935.

The song Das Herz von an echten Weaner, sung by Hans Moser as Brandler, Cavelli's servant, is based on the melody of Wien bleibt Wien.

Other parts were played by: Herbert Hübner (Schott); Lisl Kinast (Flori Weidner); Dinah Grace (dancer): Alfred Neugebauer (von Radnigg); and Johannes Roth (clown)

== Production ==
The film was produced by the Berlin production company ABC-Film and shot in the Rosenhügel and Sievering Studios of Sascha-Film in October and November 1934. Because the film was shot in Austria, under the German film import quota regulations it counted as an Austrian production, but under the Austrian regulations it counted as a German film because the producers were German.

The sound system was that of Tobis-Klangfilm. The set designer and builder was Julius von Borsody.

The distribution was undertaken by the Neue Deutsche Lichtspiel-Syndikat (N.D.L.S.) in Berlin and by Huschak & Co. in Vienna. The film was promoted by the producers, ABC-Film of Berlin, and by the Viennese Tobis-Sascha-Filmindustrie.

== Censor's decisions and versions ==
In Germany the film was checked by the censors on 21 December 1934 and forbidden for children's viewing. At its first showing in Germany the film was 2,468 metres long, in Austria 2,500 metres. Today the film is available for viewing to those aged 16 and over. (FSK)

== Reception ==
Writing for The Spectator in 1936, Graham Greene gave the film a generally poor review, noting that although he has a general fondness for Rudolph Foster's films of gentility and breeding, this film showcased "breeding [...] gone berserk". By way of an illustration, Greene highlighted the scene of the Count's riding act where the immensely mustachioed and overpoweringly noble Count dances his horse delicately on hoof-tip, characterizing it as "indescribably absurd".

== See also ==
- List of films about horses
