= By a Nose (1949 film) =

1949 film

- Directed by: E.W. Emo
- Written by: Bobby E. Lüthge; Willy Prager
- Produced by: Kurt Ulrich
- Starring: Theo Lingen; Hans Moser; Sonja Ziemann
- Cinematography: Kurt Schulz
- Edited by: Hilde E. Grabow
- Music by: Willy Schmidt-Gentner
- Production company: Berolina Film
- Distributed by: Herzog Film
- Release date: 25 October 1949
- Running time: 101 minutes
- Country: West Germany
- Language: German

By a Nose (German: Um eine Nasenlänge) is a 1949 West German sports comedy film directed by E.W. Emo and starring Theo Lingen, Hans Moser and Sonja Ziemann. It was shot at the Göttingen Studios. The film's sets were designed by the art directors Hans Ledersteger and Ernst Richter. It is a remake of the 1931 film of the same title directed by Johannes Guter during the Weimar era.

== Synopsis ==
Newspaper deliveryman Felix meets the attractive Anni and to impress her pretends that he is actually Willy Lohmeyer a friend of his who is a celebrated six day bicycle racer. Unbeknownst to him Anni is herself pretending to be a top dancer. To maintain his pretence he hangs around the stadium, but when Willy is injured he takes over during the race and "wins by a nose".

== Cast ==
- Theo Lingen as Felix Rabe, Zeitungsfahrer
- Hans Moser as Josef Eibetzeder, Manager
- Sonja Ziemann as Anni Klingebeil
- Rudolf Prack as Willy Lohmeyer, berühmter 6-Tage Rennfahrer
- Ilse Petri as Lilly Mertens, Tänzerin
- Kurt Seifert as Teddy, Barbesitzer
- Trude Hesterberg as Therese, seine Gattin
- Georg Thomalla as Max, Mixer in der Kolibri-Bar
- Martha Hübner as Frau Klingebeil, Portiersfrau
- Liesl Karlstadt as Frau Schmidt, Inhaberin eines Zeitungskiosks
- Gerlach Fiedler as Rundfunkreporter
- Hans Richter as Sperling, Rennbahnbesucher
- Gerrit Boyen as 6-Tage-Rennfahrer aus Holland, himself
- Arie Vooren as 6-Tage- Rennfahrer aus Holland, himself
- Fernando Terruzzi as 6-Tage-Rennfahrer aus Italien, himself
- Severino Rigoni as 6-Tage-Rennfahrer aus Italien, himself
- Rudi Mirke as 6-Tage-Rennfahrer aus Deutschland, himself
- Hans Preiskeit as 6-Tage-Rennfahrer aus Deutschland, himself
- Georg Singer as 6-Tage-Rennfahrer aus Deutschland, himself
- Gebrüder Hörmann as Themselves
- Sepp Kohlbeck as 6-Tage-Rennfahrer aus Deutschland, himself
- Hans Kaune as 6-Tage-Rennfahrer aus Deutchland, himself

== Bibliography ==
- Bock, Hans-Michael & Bergfelder, Tim. The Concise CineGraph. Encyclopedia of German Cinema. Berghahn Books, 2009.
- Frank, Stefanie Mathilde. Wiedersehen im Wirtschaftswunder: Remakes von Filmen aus der Zeit des Nationalsozialismus in der Bundesrepublik 1949–1963. V&R Unipress, 2017.
