= Lotte Lang =

Austrian actress

- Born: Charlotte Lang-Binder; 11 January 1900; Vienna, Austria-Hungary
- Died: 13 February 1985 (aged 85); Vienna, Austria
- Occupation: Actress
- Years active: 1932-1979

Lotte Lang (11 January 1900 – 13 February 1985) was an Austrian actress. She appeared in more than 80 films and television shows between 1932 and 1979.

== Selected filmography ==
- Must We Get Divorced? (1933)
- Tales from the Vienna Woods (1934)
- Under Blazing Heavens (1936)
- Darling of the Sailors (1937)
- The Jumping Jack (1938)
- To Be God One Time (1942)
- The White Dream (1943)
- Orient Express (1944)
- The Heart Must Be Silent (1944)
- The Millionaire (1947)
- We've Just Got Married (1949)
- Theodore the Goalkeeper (1950)
- The Midnight Venus (1951)
- Wedding in the Hay (1951)
- Shame on You, Brigitte! (1952)
- Season in Salzburg (1952)
- A Night in Venice (1953)
- The Stolen Trousers (1956)
- And Who Is Kissing Me? (1956)
- Big Request Concert (1960)
- Our Crazy Aunts (1961)
- Dance with Me Into the Morning (1962)
- Marry Me, Cherie (1964)
- In Bed by Eight (1965)
