= Judgement Day (1940 film) =

1940 film directed by Franz Seitz

- Directed by: Franz Seitz
- Written by: Walter Reichhardt; Franz Seitz
- Produced by: Karl Hartl; Erich von Neusser
- Starring: Hans Holt; Olly Holzmann; Susi Nicoletti
- Cinematography: Robert Lach
- Edited by: Axel von Werner
- Music by: Hans Lang
- Production company: Wien-Film
- Distributed by: Bavaria Film
- Release date: 12 January 1940
- Running time: 77 minutes
- Country: Austria (Part of Greater Germany)
- Language: German

Judgement Day (German: Das jüngste Gericht) is a 1940 German comedy drama film directed by Franz Seitz and starring Hans Holt, Olly Holzmann and Susi Nicoletti. Location shooting took place in Waidhofen . The film's sets were designed by the art directors Hans Ledersteger and Ernst Richter. It was produced in Vienna by Wien-Film, a company set up following the German annexation of Austria. It was shot at the Rosenhügel and Sievering Studios in the city.

== Synopsis ==
Ferdinand Strubel wants his daughter Marianne to marry the son of wealthy brewery owner Baron von Schnackenberg. However Marianne has fallen in love with teacher Leopold, despite her father already setting the wedding day. Leopold has an idea when he reads of the passing of Halley's Comet the day before the marriage is due to take place. He convinces Ferdinand Strubel that the world will end when the comet hits, and hopes that the coming judgement day will lead Strubel to call off the wedding.

== Cast ==
- Hans Holt as Leopold Forster, Turnlehrer
- Olly Holzmann as Josefine Pawelek
- Susi Nicoletti as Marianne Strubel
- Karl Skraup as Ferdinand Strubel
- Erik Frey as Rudolf von Schnackenberg
- Bruno Hübner as Auzinger, Phsyik-Professor
- Herta Mayen as Junge Ehefrau
- Anton Pointner as Maximilian von Schnackenberg
- Ferdinand Mayerhofer as Schönthaler, Bürgermeister
- Gertrud Wolle as Ottilie Sedlmeyer
- Mimi Shorp as Fritzi Strohmeyer
- Gisa Wurm as Elisabeth Strubel
- Wolf Floderer as Peter Strubel
- Helene Lauterböck as Therese von Schnackenberg
- Hans Schulz as Nepomuk
- Maria Schnorrpfeil as Rosa, Ladenmädchen

== Bibliography ==
- Von Dassanowsky, Robert. Austrian Cinema: A History. McFarland, 2005.
