= Vienna 1910 =

1943 film

- Directed by: E. W. Emo
- Starring: Rudolf Forster; Heinrich George; Lil Dagover
- Music by: Willy Schmidt-Gentner
- Release date: 1943
- Country: Germany
- Language: German
- Budget: 2,497,000 ℛℳ (equivalent to €10,203,250 in 2021)

Vienna 1910 (German: Wien 1910) is a 1943 German biographical film directed by Emerich Walter Emo and starring Rudolf Forster, Heinrich George, and Lil Dagover. It is based on the life of Mayor of Vienna Karl Lueger. Its antisemitic content led to it being banned by the Allied Occupation forces following the Second World War.

== Cast ==
- Rudolf Forster as Mayor Dr. Karl Lueger
- Heinrich George as Georg Ritter von Schönerer
- Lil Dagover as Maria Anschütz
- Carl Kuhlmann as Kommerzialrat Lechner
- O. W. Fischer as Karl Lechner
- Otto Treßler as Count Eduard Von Paar
- Heinrich Heilinger as Dr. Geßmann
- Harry Hardt as Dr. Weißkirchner
- Alfred Neugebauer as Pumera, Diener Luegers
- Auguste Pünkösdy as Hildegard, Lueger's sister
- Rosa Albach-Retty as Rosa, Lueger's sister
- Eduard Köck as Prof. Dr. Pupowatsch
- Herbert Hübner as Dr. Viktor Adler
- Kurt Lessen as Josef Neumayer
