= Olly Holzmann =

Austrian actress

- Born: 31 October 1915; Vienna, Austro-Hungarian Empire
- Died: August 1995 (aged 79); London, England
- Occupation: Actress
- Years active: 1939–1950 (film)

Olly Holzmann (1915–1995) was an Austrian dancer and film actress. During the Second World War, she appeared in films made by Wien-Film.

== Selected filmography ==
- Hotel Sacher (1939)
- A Mother's Love (1939)
- Woman in the River (1939)
- My Aunt, Your Aunt (1939)
- Vienna Tales (1940)
- Judgement Day (1940)
- Seven Years Hard Luck (1940)
- The White Dream (1943)
- Dog Days (1944)
- In the Temple of Venus (1948)

== Bibliography ==
- Robert von Dassanowsky. Austrian Cinema: A History. McFarland, 2005.
