= Wolf Albach-Retty =

Austrian actor (1906–1967)

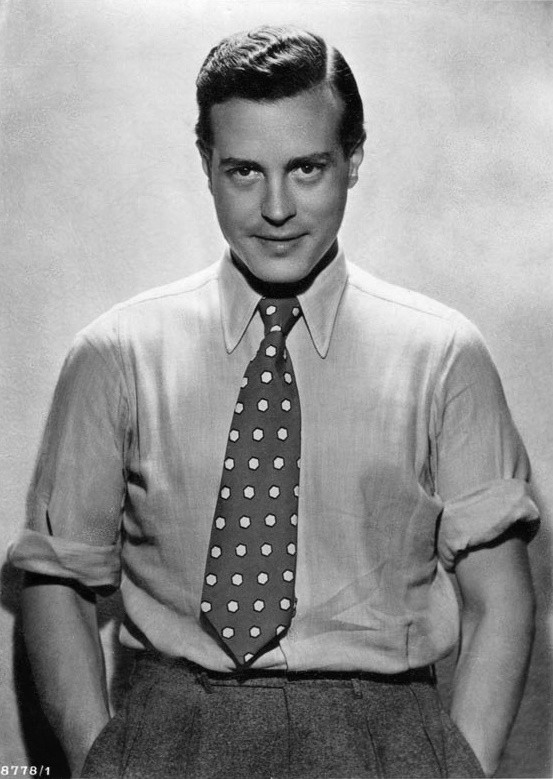
- Albach-Retty c. 1935
- Born: Wolfgang Helmuth Albert Albach; 28 May 1906; Vienna, Austria-Hungary
- Died: 21 February 1967 (aged 60); Vienna, Austria
- Burial place: Vienna Central Cemetery
- Education: University of Music and Performing Arts Vienna
- Occupation: Actor
- Years active: 1926–1966
- Spouses: Magda Schneider (m. 1937; div. 1945) Trude Marlen (m. 1947)
- Children: Romy Schneider
- Parent(s): Karl Walter Albach; Rosa Albach-Retty

Wolf Albach-Retty (born Wolfgang Helmuth Albert Albach; 28 May 1906 – 21 February 1967) was an Austrian actor. He was the father of Romy Schneider with the German actress Magda Schneider.

== Career ==
Born as Wolfgang Helmuth Albert Albach in Vienna to actress Rosa Albach-Retty and K. u. K. officer Karl Albach, Albach-Retty trained at the University of Music and Performing Arts Vienna, and at the age of twenty played his first role at the Vienna Burgtheater.

He was a young man when he first appeared in a silent film role in 1927. In 1933 Albach-Retty became a patron member of the SS and in 1940 he joined the Nazi Party.

During the Third Reich, he made romance films and musicals. In 1936 he married Magda Schneider and temporarily took up German citizenship. In 1944, he was added to head of Reich Ministry of Public Enlightenment and Propaganda Joseph Goebbels' Gottbegnadeten list of individuals that Goebbels considered crucial to Nazi culture. His addition to the list made him exempt from military service obligations.

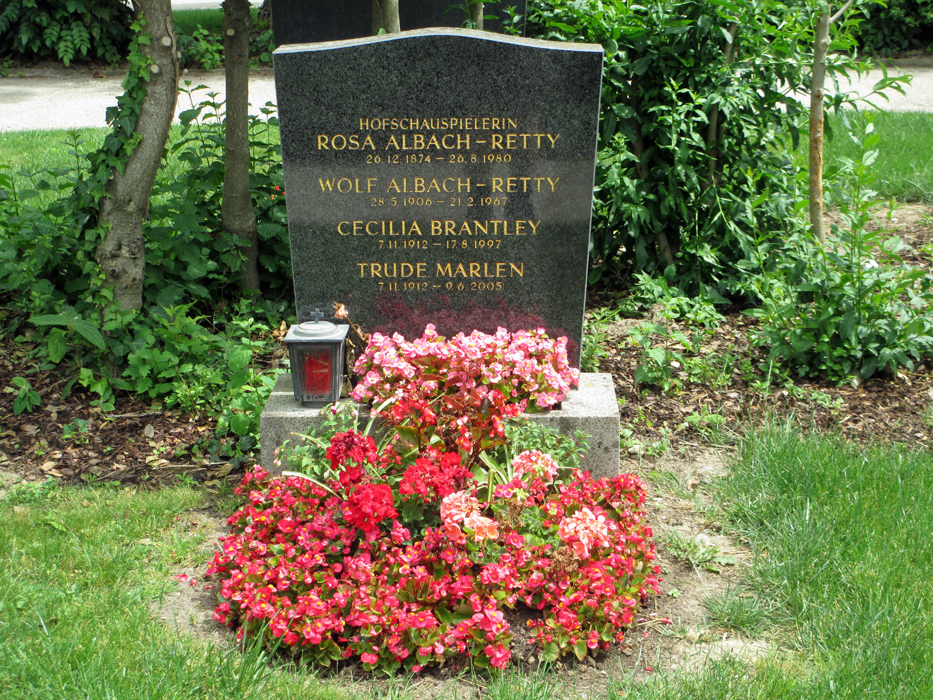
Grave of Albach-Retty at Vienna's Zentralfriedhof

After World War II, his acting career soured as his past successes were no longer remembered, and he was only able to find supporting acting roles in films. He returned to the Burgtheater and starred in, among other plays, Anatol by Arthur Schnitzler. By that time, he was into his second marriage to actress Trude Marlen. Together, they had a daughter, Sacha Darwin (born 1947). He died in Vienna on 21 February 1967 and is buried in Vienna's Zentralfriedhof.

== Selected filmography ==
- Das grobe Hemd (1927)
- Ein Wiener Musikantenmädel (1928)
- The Mysterious Mirror (1928) as Sculptor
- Love in May (1928)
- Der Dieb im Schlafcoupée (1929)
- The Uncle from Sumatra (1930)
- General Babka (1930)
- Der Fleck auf der Ehr' (1930) as Fred, Mrs. von Werner's grandson
- Wiener Zauberklänge (1931) as Teddy Beamgarden
- Two Hearts Beat as One (1932) as Victor Müller
- Girls to Marry (1932) as Paul, Robert Groll's brother
- The Beautiful Adventure (1932) as Andre d'Eguzon
- The Black Hussar (1932) as Leutnant Aribert von Blome
- And the Plains Are Gleaming (1933) as Peter Borly, Husarenleutnant
- Kind, ich freu' mich auf dein Kommen (1933) as Herbert
- Love Must Be Understood (1933) as Bobby Brandt, Ellens Vetter
- Just Once a Great Lady (1934) as Heinz von Wolfenstein
- Spring Parade (1934) as Wilhelm August Jurek
- Tales from the Vienna Woods (1934) as Graf Rudi von Waldheim
- The Cat in the Bag (1935) as Edmund Vernon, Rennfahrer
- Winter Night's Dream (1935) as Peter Kreutzberg
- Großreinemachen (1935) as Robert Cox
- The Bird Seller (1935) as Adam der Vogelhändler
- Sylvia und ihr Chauffeur (1935)as Dr. Hartenegg
- Rendezvous in Vienna (1936) as Franz Lenhardt – Musiker
- The Fairy Doll (1936) as Alexander – sein Bruder
- Geheimnis eines alten Hauses (1936) as Teddy Eberlein
- Millionäre/Ich möcht' so gern mit Dir allein sein (1937) as Fred, beider Sohn
- Die glücklichste Ehe der Welt (1937) as Peter Reiterer
- Darling of the Sailors (1937) as Kapitänleutnant Igor Juritsch
- Frühlingsluft (1938) as Erbprinz, Rudolf
- The Jumping Jack (1938) as Paul Oertel
- Hotel Sacher (1939) as Lt. Herrngruber
- Liebe streng verboten (1939)
- Heimatland (1939) as Günther Nordmann, Reitlehrer
- A Mother's Love (1939) as Walter Pirlinger – 1922
- Das Glück wohnt nebenan (1939)
- Wie konntest Du, Veronika (1940) as Dr. Fred Junker
- Falstaff in Vienna (1940) as Robert von Weitenegg
- Seven Years Hard Luck (1940) as Heinz Kersten
- So gefällst Du mir (1941) as Peter Seidl
- Tanz mit dem Kaiser (1941) as Rittmeister von Kleber
- Die heimliche Gräfin (1942) as Michael Hohenwardt
- Seven Years of Good Luck/Seven Years of Happiness (1942) as Heinz Kersten
- Two Happy People (1943)
- Mask in Blue (1943) as Georg Harding
- Abenteuer im Grand Hotel (1943) as Rudolf, Count Lerchenau / Rudi Lindt
- The White Dream (1943) as Ernst Eder
- Reisebekanntschaft (1943) as Walter Falke
- Alles aus Liebe (1943) as Rolf Möller, Tierdresseur
- Romantische Brautfahrt (1944) as Der junge Baron Ferdinand Crisander
- Dog Days (1944) as Dr. Paul Wendler
- A Man Like Maximilian (1945) as Dr. Thomas Hesse
- Wie ein Dieb in der Nacht (1945)
- Alles Lüge (1948) as Will Wolters
- Ein bezaubernder Schwindler (1949) as Martin Palmer, junger Komponist
- Dangerous Guests (1949) as Peter Anders
- Grossstadtnacht (1950) as Alfred Siedler
- Two in One Suit (1950) as Otto Vogel
- The Man in Search of Himself (1950) as Marius Aldon
- Czardas of Hearts (1951) as Peter Tornay / Paul Endre
- Woe to Him Who Loves (1951) as Dr. Gött
- Unschuld in tausend Nöten/Das Mädel aus der Konfektion (1951) as Dr. Singer
- Verklungenes Wien (1951) as Sandor von Halvany
- Zwei in einem Auto (1951) as Georg Schmittlein
- Der Mann in der Wanne (1952)
- Ideal Woman Sought (1952) as Robby Holm
- The Mine Foreman (1952) as Andreas Spaun, ein Kavalier
- The Bird Seller (1953) as Fürst
- The Great Lola (1954) as Carlo Werner
- The Sweetest Fruits (1954) as Roberto di Caramello / Bananen-Beppo
- School for Marriage (1954) as Tobias
- The Seven Dresses of Katrin (1954) as Martin Pall
- His Daughter is Called Peter (1955) as Ingenieur Max Klaar, ihr Vater
- Your Life Guards (1955) as Onkel Nikolaus
- And Who Is Kissing Me? (1956) as Lindner
- Die Stimme der Sehnsucht (1956) as Enrico Alovanis
- Engagement at Wolfgangsee (1956) as Erich Eckberg
- Imperial and Royal Field Marshal (1956) as Baron Linsky
- Dort in der Wachau (1957) as Kapitän Paul Heider
- Wetterleuchten um Maria (1957) as Baron Siebenzell
- Der Kaiser und das Wäschermädel (1957) as Erzherzog Max
- Endangered Girls (1958) as Dr. Thomas Jensen
- Man ist nur zweimal jung (1958) asPeter Grafenegger
- Immer die Radfahrer (1958) as Prof. Johannes Büttner
- Mein ganzes Herz ist voll Musik (1958) as Niko Berthold
- Herrn Josefs letzte Liebe (1959) as Albert Türkheim
- Peter, das Zirkuskind/Auf allen Strassen (1959) as Christian, Gutsbesitzer
- Girls for the Mambo-Bar (1959) as Krüger
- Hunting Party (1959) as Friedrich Dahlhoff
- Frauen in Teufels Hand (1960) as Herr von Parisi
- Hohe Tannen (1960) as Mr. Reichert
- Der Orgelbauer von St. Marien (1961) as Baron von Danning
- Autofahrer unterwegs/Auf den Strassen einer Stadt (1961) as Peters
- The Post Has Gone (1962) as Lukas Lenz
- The Forester's Daughter (1962) as Graf Paalen
- Bergwind (1963) as Herr Meister
- The Cardinal (1963) as Baron Hartman (his only film with Romy Schneider)
- The Great Skate (1964) as Chef der Wiener Eisrevue
- Die Kinder (1964, TV movie) as Gandolf Graf Freyn
- Das Mädel aus dem Böhmerwald (1964) as Herr Baumann
- Leinen aus Irland (1965, TV movie) as Ministerialrat Kress
- Die Tänzerin Fanny Elßler (1966, TV movie) as Fürst Esterházy (final film role)
