= Herbert Hübner =

German actor (1889-1972)

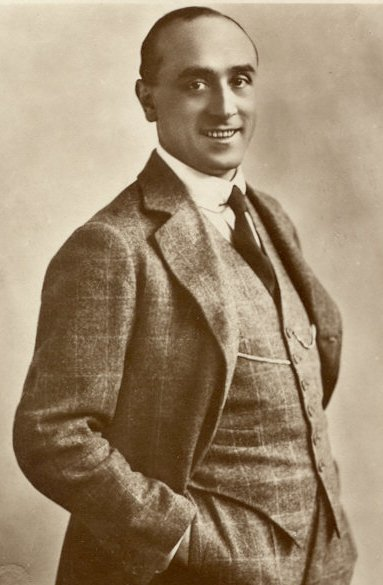
- Born: Herbert Richard Eberhard Hermann Hübner; 6 February 1889; Breslau, German Empire (now Wrocław, Poland)
- Died: 27 January 1972 (aged 82); Munich, West Germany
- Occupation: Actor
- Years active: 1907–1966

Herbert Hübner (6 February 1889 – 27 January 1972) was a German stage and film actor. He appeared in more than 150 films between 1921 and 1966. He was born in Breslau, Germany (now Wrocław, Poland) and died in Munich, West Germany.

== Selected filmography ==
- Satan Diktator (1920) - Lord Joel von Kensington
- Destinée (1920)
- Seines Bruders Leibeigener (1921) - Unehelicher Sohn Alexej
- Die Teppichknüpferin von Bagdad (1922)
- Die Spitzklöpperin von Valenciennes (1923)
- Die Egoisten. Die reich heiraten wollen (1924) - Hugo Meier, Machinist
- Storm in a Water Glass (1931) - Quilling - Zeitungsverleger
- The Prince of Arcadia (1932)
- Sehnsucht 202 (1932) - Otto Hesse
- Madame hat Besuch (1932)
- Ripening Youth (1933) - Dr. Albing
- A Precocious Girl (1934) - Hartwig
- Carnival of Love (1934) - Türkheim, Automobilfabrikant
- Tales from the Vienna Woods (1934)
- A Star Fell from Heaven (1934) - Tomson, sein Manager
- The Secret of Cavelli (1934) - Schott
- Wäsche - Waschen - Wohlergehen (1934)
- Asew (1935) - Lopuchin, Russischer Polizeigeneral
- The Cossack and the Nightingale (1935) - Dr. Frederik Hammersvelt
- Anschlag auf Schweda (1935) - Der Untersuchungsrichter
- The Dreamer (1936) - Landrat von Kannewurf
- The Czar's Courier (1936) - Grand Duke Fedor
- Victoria in Dover (1936) - Sir John Conroy
- Savoy Hotel 217 (1936) - Julio Simkowitsch - Personalchef
- Die letzte Fahrt der Santa Margareta (1936) - Enrico B. Costa
- Family Parade (1936) - Baron Barrenkrona
- Moral (1936) - Justizrat Hauser
- Dinner Is Served (1936) - Lord Wimple
- Ave Maria (1936) - Konzertdirektor in Paris
- The Accusing Song (1936) - Kriminalkommissar Collander
- Romance (1936) - Präsident Leonhardt
- The Court Concert (1936) - Staatsminister von Arnegg
- The Ruler (1937) - Direktor Erich Klamroth - deren Mann
- Condottieri (1937) - Duke d'Urbino
- Dangerous Game (1937) - Bankier Hirt
- Alarm in Peking (1937) - Korvettenkapitän Radain
- To New Shores (1937) - Casino-Direktor
- An Enemy of the People (1937) - Bürgermeister Stockmann
- Another World (1937) - Lord Brandmore
- Starke Herzen (1937) - Nikoll, Major
- The Secret Lie (1938) - Bartell
- Travelling People (1938) - Circus Director Edward Barlay
- What Now, Sibylle? (1938) - Professor Strobl
- Red Orchids (1938) - Professor Castro
- Rubber (1938) - Konsul Waverley
- Dreizehn Mann und eine Kanone (1938)
- Sergeant Berry (1938) - Don Antonio de Garcia
- Three Wonderful Days (1939)
- Hotel Sacher (1939) - Barnoff
- Ich verweigere die Aussage (1939) - Paul Ottendorf
- Robert and Bertram (1939) - Nathan Ipelmeyer
- Who's Kissing Madeleine? (1939) - Courbierre
- Kitty and the World Conference (1939) - Wirtschaftsminister von Coprador
- We Danced Around the World (1939) - Jonny Hester, Agenturbesitzer
- Der Weg zu Isabel (1940) - Beauchamps
- A Man Astray (1940) - Meyers
- Commissioner Eyck (1940) - Hauber
- The Rothschilds (1940) - Turner - Banker
- Trenck the Pandur (1940) - Fürst Solojew
- Das Herz der Königin (1940) - Lord Arran
- Friedrich Schiller – The Triumph of a Genius (1940) - General Rieger
- Kora Terry (1940) - Stefan Borodyn - Großindustrieller
- Fahrt ins Leben (1940) - Generaldirektor Hellgrewe
- Carl Peters (1941) - Councillor Leo Kayser
- Riding for Germany (1941) - Pferdehändler
- Goodbye, Franziska (1941) - Ted Simmons
- The Way to Freedom (1941) - Landrat von Strempel
- Comrades (1941) - Oberst Dupont
- Women Are Better Diplomats (1941) - Dr. Schuster
- Secret File W.B.1 (1942) - Admiral Brommy
- The Great King (1942) - Count Finkenstein (uncredited)
- Andreas Schlüter (1942) - Minister Johann von Wartenberg
- Die Entlassung (1942) - General Adjutant von Hahnke
- Voice of the Heart (1942) - Senator Bulthaupt
- The War of the Oxen (1943)
- Back Then (1943) - Professor Rigaud, Klinikleiter
- Paracelsus (1943) - Count von Hohenreid
- Heaven, We Inherit a Castle (1943)
- The Endless Road (1943) - Handelsgerichtsbeisitzender
- Vienna 1910 (1943) - Dr. Viktor Adler
- Circus Renz (1943) - Zirkuskönig Déjean
- Johann (1943) - Direktor Schupfelhuber
- Wild Bird (1943) - Herr von Demnitz
- Harald Arrives at Nine (1944) - 1. Gerichtsvorsitzender
- Der große Preis (1944) - Direktor Wullenberg
- Junge Adler (1944) - Direktor Brakke
- The Roedern Affair (1944) - General von Krusemarck
- Das Leben geht weiter (1945)
- The Silent Guest (1945) - Von Wedelstedt, Gutsbesitzer
- Wo ist Herr Belling? (1945) - Direktor Reisch
- Thank You, I'm Fine (1948)
- 1-2-3 Corona (1948) - Studienrat Dr. Hanke
- Blum Affair (1948) - Langerichtsdirektor Hecht
- The Berliner (1948) - Herr Bollmann, politischer Redner
- Girls in Gingham (1949) - Major Markenbrunn
- The Appeal to Conscience (1949) - Generaldirektorröner
- Der Posaunist (1949) - Hasselt, Musikdirektor
- The Blue Swords (1949) - Nehmitz
- Dr. Semmelweis (1950) - Direktor Klein
- Mathilde Möhring (1950)
- Kissing Is No Sin (1950) - Christian Reinecke, Oberlehrer
- A Day Will Come (1950) - Monsieur Mombour
- Das fremde Leben (1951) - Vater Hallgart
- The Guilt of Doctor Homma (1951) - Oberstaatsanwalt Krell
- Das unmögliche Mädchen (1951)
- The Sergeant's Daughter (1952) - Major Paeschke, Kriegsgerichtsrat
- I Lost My Heart in Heidelberg (1952) - Präsident de Boers
- Illusion in a Minor Key (1952) - Dr. Bauer
- Prosecutor Corda (1953) - Oberstaatsanwalt
- Christina (1953) - Siegfried, Apotheker
- Stars Over Colombo (1953) - Zirkusdirektor
- Father Is Being Stupid (1953) - Fabrikant Ewers, Lottchens Vater
- Königliche Hoheit (1953) - General
- The Country Schoolmaster (1954) - Ernst Diewen, Ursulas Vater
- Regina Amstetten (1954) - Vorsitzender des Ärztekongresses
- The Prisoner of the Maharaja (1954) - Zirkusdirektor
- The Little Town Will Go to Sleep (1954) - Friedrich Altmann - Regierungsbaurat
- The Seven Dresses of Katrin (1954) - Dr. Heyse
- Conchita and the Engineer (1954)
- Hoheit lassen bitten (1954) - Hofmarshall von Wengefeldt
- Ein Mädchen aus Paris (1954)
- Verrat an Deutschland (1955) - Botschafter
- Ludwig II (1955) - Von Pfistermeister
- Ein Mann vergißt die Liebe (1955)
- The Ambassador's Wife (1955) - Paul de la Croix
- One Woman Is Not Enough? (1955) - Generaldirektor Oppert
- Royal Hunt in Ischl (1955)
- Der Frontgockel (1955) - Major Müller, Flieger
- Your Life Guards (1955) - Hofmarschall
- Regine (1956) - Der General
- San Salvatore (1956) - Prof. Brink
- A Thousand Melodies (1956) - Hagebutt
- Liane, Jungle Goddess (1956) - Justizrat Warmuth
- Manöverball (1956)
- My Sixteen Sons (1956)
- Made in Germany (1957) - Staatsekretär von Würmb
- Kleiner Mann - ganz groß (1957) - Professor Schröder
- The Mad Bomberg (1957) - Regimentskommandeur von Strullbach
- Different from You and Me (1957) - Verteidiger Dr. Schwarz
- The Spessart Inn (1958) - Graf Sandau
- The Copper (1958) - Polizeipräsident
- Mandolins and Moonlight (1959)
- The Haunted Castle (1960) - Hartog
- Isola Bella (1961) - Pianist Panetzki
- Liane, die Tochter des Dschungels (1961)
- Die blonde Frau des Maharadscha (1962) - Direktor des Zirkus
- Bekenntnisse eines möblierten Herrn (1963) - Onkel Eugen
- The Gentlemen (1965) - Graf - episode 'Die Intellektuellen'
- Die fromme Helene (1965) - Vater Dralle
- Shiva und die Galgenblume (1993) - (final film role)
