= A Star Fell from Heaven (1934 film) =

1934 film directed by Max Neufeld

- Directed by: Max Neufeld
- Written by: Arthur Rebner; Fritz Zoreff
- Produced by: Heinrich Hasse
- Starring: Joseph Schmidt; Egon von Jordan; Herbert Hübner
- Cinematography: Adolf Schlasy; Zoltan Vidor
- Edited by: Ladislaus Vidor
- Music by: Hans May
- Production company: Styria-Film
- Distributed by: Lux-Film
- Release date: 28 December 1934
- Running time: 86 minutes
- Country: Austria
- Language: German

A Star Fell from Heaven (German: Ein Stern fällt vom Himmel) is a 1934 Austrian musical film directed by Max Neufeld and starring Joseph Schmidt, Egon von Jordan and Herbert Hübner. It was shot at the Sievering Studios in Vienna. Two years later it was remade in Britain with Schmidt reprising his role. A later German-language film A Star Fell from Heaven, released in 1961, was unconnected to the earlier productions.

== Cast ==
- Joseph Schmidt as Joseph Reiner, Musikstudent
- Egon von Jordan as Lincoln, ein berühmter Filmtenor
- Herbert Hübner as Tomson, sein Manager
- Evi Panzner as Annerl, Tochter v. Frau Bachinger
- Elisabeth Markus as Frau Bachinger
- Rudolf Carl as Kerndl, Filmfriseur
- Alfred Neugebauer as Regisseur der Filmgesellschaft
- Franz Johan as Schneider, Aufnahmeleiter
- Karl Skraup as Dr. Freund
- Karl Ehmann
- Paul Gutman
- Reinhold Häussermann
- Ernst Hausman
- Eugen Neufeld
- Ernst Wieland as Professor Türmer
- Helga Demmer as Susi, ein 8jähriges Kind
- Trude Krishaber
- Ernst Rollé
- Das Wiener Boheme-Quartett

== Bibliography ==
- Bock, Hans-Michael & Bergfelder, Tim. The Concise Cinegraph: Encyclopaedia of German Cinema. Berghahn Books, 2009.
