= Theo Lingen =

German actor (1903–1978)

- Publicity photo
- Born: Franz Theodor Schmitz; 10 June 1903; Hanover, Prussia
- Died: 10 November 1978 (aged 75); Vienna, Austria
- Occupations: Actor, film director, screenwriter
- Years active: 1929–1978
- Spouse: Marianne Zoff (1928–78)

Theo Lingen (German pronunciation: [ˈteːo ˈlɪŋən]; 10 June 1903 – 10 November 1978), born Franz Theodor Schmitz, was a German actor, film director and screenwriter. He appeared in more than 230 films between 1929 and 1978, and directed 21 films between 1936 and 1960.

== Life and career ==
Lingen was born the son of a lawyer in the city of Hanover and grew up there. He attended the Royal Goethe Gymnasium – the predecessor of the Goethe School – in Hanover, but left before taking the Abitur (final exams). His theatrical talent was discovered during rehearsals for a school performance at the Schauburg boulevard theatre.

Beginning his professional stage career, the young actor adopted as a stage name his middle name together with that of the birthplace of his father, Lingen in the North German Emsland region. As "Theo Lingen" he performed at theatres at Hanover, Halberstadt, Münster and Frankfurt; in plays like The Importance of Being Earnest he very quickly earned a reputation as a superb character comedian, distinguished by his characteristic nasal speech. This distinction followed him when he began appearing in films in 1929, often together with the Viennese actor Hans Moser, since together they made a contrasting pair. In 1929 he was invited by Bertolt Brecht to the Theater am Schiffbauerdamm in Berlin, where he performed as Macheath in The Threepenny Opera. He starred in drama films like M and The Testament of Dr. Mabuse directed by Fritz Lang.

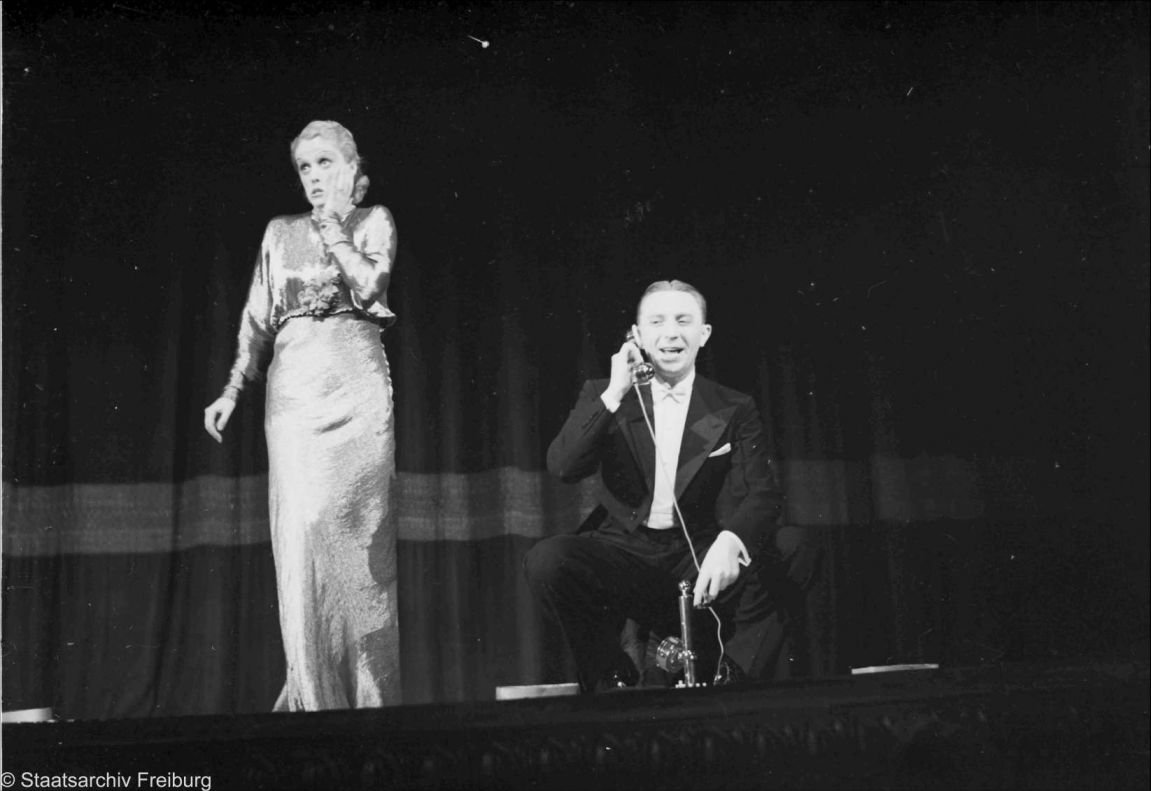
Lingen and Genia Nikolajewa performing at the Scala vaudeville theatre in Berlin, 1936

In February 1928, Lingen's daughter, Ursula, was born to Bertold Brecht's then wife Marianne Zoff (1893–1984). Brecht and Zoff divorced in September; Lingen and Zoff married later the same year and also raised Zoff's elder daughter Hanne. Conditions worsened after the Machtergreifung of 30 January 1933. Because Zoff was of Jewish descent, which under the Nazi regime usually resulted in a professional disqualification (Berufsverbot), Lingen thought about going into exile. However, because of his great popularity with the general public, he was given a special permit by Propaganda Minister Joseph Goebbels to continue to perform and was able to protect his wife from persecution. In 1936 Gustaf Gründgens placed Lingen at the ensemble of the Berlin Prussian State Theatre. He also directed films like Hauptsache glücklich (1941) starring Heinz Rühmann.

In 1944, Lingen moved to Vienna, and, in view of the approaching Red Army, retired to his cottage at Strobl on the Wolfgangsee shortly afterwards. For a few days in May 1945, he acted as de facto mayor, disempowering the local Nazi authorities and surrendering to the US Army at St. Gilgen. Lingen's measures were followed by the liberation of King Leopold III of Belgium and his wife by the 106th Cavalry Regiment.

After the war, he became a naturalised Austrian citizen and, from 1948, worked as a character actor at the Vienna Burgtheater. He also appeared frequently onstage in Germany, most notably in Carl Sternheim satires directed by Rudolf Noelte. Foremost, however, he pursued his film career, performing in numerous comedies of varied quality. In the 1970s, he also worked in television, for example, as a presenter for Laurel and Hardy films.

Theo Lingen died of cancer in 1978 at the age of 75 in Vienna. The city of Vienna dedicated an honorary grave to him at the Zentralfriedhof. The municipalities of Strobl and Lingen (in 2007) named squares in his honor.

== Selected filmography ==
- Dolly Gets Ahead (1930) - Conny Coon
- Zwei Krawatten (1930) - Charles
- Die große Sehnsucht (1930) - Self - Theo Lingen
- The Flute Concert of Sanssouci (1930) - Kent
- The Firm Gets Married (1931) - Reisender Philipps
- M (1931) - Bauernfänger
- No More Love (1931) - Rhinelander
- My Wife, the Impostor (1931) - Manager Ileanas
- Ronny (1931)
- Man Equals Man (1931, documentary of stage production) - Uria Shelley
- You Don't Forget Such a Girl (1932) - Hahnen Jr.
- Two Heavenly Blue Eyes (1932) - Mr. Bottlekeeper
- The Ladies Diplomat (1932) - Drage
- The Countess of Monte Cristo (1932) - Etagenkellner
- A Mad Idea (1932) - Oberkellner
- Modern Dowry (1932) - Brömmel - Autoverkäufer
- Gypsies of the Night (1932) - Theo
- Frederica (1932) - Lachender Herr
- The Testament of Cornelius Gulden (1932) - Edgar Magnussen
- The Tsar's Diamond (1932) - Köppke, Redakteur
- Spell of the Looking Glass (1932) - Rosnowsky, Finanzagent
- Das Abenteuer der Thea Roland (1932)
- A City Upside Down (1933) - Fred
- The Big Bluff (1933) - Der Pressechef
- Marion, That's Not Nice (1933) - Der 2.Reklamechef bei Satorius
- And Who Is Kissing Me? (1933) - Der Inspizient
- The Little Crook (1933) - Der Sohn
- The Peak Scaler (1933) - Ein Kellner
- The Testament of Dr. Mabuse (1933) - Karetzky
- The Escape to Nice (1933) - Herr Bock
- Little Man, What Now? (1933) - Der Verkäufer
- Love Must Be Understood (1933) - Hotel-Emil
- Ein Unsichtbarer geht durch die Stadt (1933) - 1. Gast Lissys
- Waltz War (1933) - Sir Phillips
- Little Girl, Great Fortune (1933) - Benzig, Besitzer der Audag
- Höllentempo (1933) - Harald Löns
- Zwei im Sonnenschein (1933) - Der Verkäufer
- Her Highness the Saleswoman (1933) - Felix
- Das Lied vom Glück (1933) - Francois, Haushofmeister
- Keine Angst vor Liebe (1933) - Teddy Flink
- The Hunter from Kurpfalz (1933) - Schröder
- The Grand Duke's Finances (1934) - Fuerst Potemkin
- Financial Opportunists (1934) - Glaser, Grundstücksspekulant
- Ich kenn' dich nicht und liebe dich (1934) - Diener Stephan
- A Precocious Girl (1934) - Anton, Diener bei Dr. Werner
- The Double (1934) - Detektiv Superbus
- A Girl Whirls By the World (1934) - Hugo Kühlemann, Prokurist
- My Heart Calls You (1934) - Coq, sein Sekretär
- The Flower Girl from the Grand Hotel (1934) - Thumser, Spielleiter
- ...heute abend bei mir (1934) - Flipp, the servant
- Paganini (1934) - Ihr Hofmarschall Pimpinelli
- Schön ist es, verliebt zu sein (1934) - Oberkeller im 'Tabarin'
- Ein Walzer für dich (1934) - Flint, Impressario
- Liebe dumme Mama (1934) - Fischer
- The Prodigal Son (1934)
- Spring Parade (1934) - Baron Zorndorf
- I Marry My Wife (1934) - Heinrich Wittekind
- Ich sehne mich nach dir (1934) - Pelle
- Ihr größter Erfolg (1934) - Augustin Schöpser, Ballettmeister
- Petersburger Nächte (1935) - Hitzinger, Konzertagent
- The Cat in the Bag (1935) - Tiwi Dollin, ihr Vetter
- Winter Night's Dream (1935) - Kautz
- Ein falscher Fuffziger (1935) - Karl Lehmann
- Der Schlafwagenkontrolleur (1935) - Alois
- Heaven on Earth (1935) - Theaterdirektor Platzer
- Wer wagt - gewinnt (1935)
- I Love All the Women (1935) - Hans Heinz Hinz
- Lessons in Love (1935) - Melchior Feuerfuchs
- The Valley of Love (1935) - Der Keuschheitskommissar
- The White Horse Inn (1935) - Kommerzienrat Fürst
- Hero for a Night (1935) - Oberlehrer Schneemilch
- Miguel Strogoff (1936) - Harry Blount, British journalist
- The Czar's Courier (1936)
- Ungeküsst soll man nicht schlafen gehn (1936) - Direktor Toni Miller
- Die Entführung (1936) - Justin
- Thank You, Madame (1936) - Der Diener
- Der verkannte Lebemann (1936) - Fritz Bolke - Diener bei Schröder
- Fräulein Veronika (1936) - Fuchs - Abteilungschef
- A Wedding Dream (1936) - Prinz von Illyrien
- Die Leute mit dem Sonnenstich (1936) - Thomas Bruckmann - Kompagnon des Konsuls
- Es geht um mein Leben (1936) - Fritz Schlemke
- Madona in Warenhaus (1936)
- Der Mann, von dem man spricht (1937) - Diener Haßler
- Premiere (1937) - Inspizient Dornbusch
- Dangerous Game (1937) - Paul Hoffmann
- Heiratsinstitut Ida & Co (1937) - Dr. Linke
- The Unexcused Hour (1937) - Fritz Ortmann - Lehramtskandidat
- Fremdenheim Filoda (1937) - Paul 'Bulli' Trinkmeyer
- Die Austernlilli (1937) - Lucien Mercour, ein Revue-Autor
- The Charm of La Boheme (1937) - Aristide Boupon
- Die verschwundene Frau (1937)
- The Missing Wife (1937)
- The Tiger of Eschnapur (1938) - Emil Sperling, Mitarbeiter Fürbringers
- Immer wenn ich glücklich bin..! (1938) - Schnuller, Ballettmeister
- The Indian Tomb (1938) - Emil Sperling
- Die unruhigen Mädchen (1938) - Kurt Stegemann
- Diskretion – Ehrensache (1938) - Lord Benton
- The Optimist (1938)
- Dir gehört mein Herz (German-language version, 1938) - Luigi
- The Stars Shine (1938) - Himself
- Dance on the Volcano (1938) - Graf Cambouilly
- Marionette (Italian-language version, 1939) - Luigi
- Drunter und drüber (1939)
- Das Abenteuer geht weiter (1939) - Gepke - Sekretär
- Eine Frau für Drei (1939) - Karl Findeisen
- Hochzeitsreise zu dritt (1939) - Klinke
- Opera Ball (1939) - Diener Philipp
- Rote Mühle (1940)
- The Unfaithful Eckehart (1940) - Eckehart, Schwiegerson
- Her Private Secretary (1940) - Dr. Kiesewetter
- Was wird hier gespielt? (also director, 1940)
- The Girl from Barnhelm (1940) - Riccaut de la Marlinière
- Herz – modern möbliert (also director, 1940) - Hans Schröder
- Roses in Tyrol (1940) - Leberle, Adjutant
- Seven Years Hard Luck (1940) - Paul, Kerstens Diener
- Happiness Is the Main Thing (1941, director) - (uncredited)
- Thrice Wed (1941) - Felix
- Mistress Moon (also director, 1941) - Lepke
- Was geschah in dieser Nacht? (1941, also director) - Anton
- Sonntagskinder (1941) - Hoteldirektor Oberweger
- Vienna Blood (1942) - Jean (Georg's chamberlain)
- Seven Years of Good Luck (1942, German-language version) - Paul Griebling
- Seven Years of Happiness (1942, Italian-language version) - Gribling, il cameriere
- Liebeskomödie (1943, also director) - Max, Oberkellner im Imperial
- Tolle Nacht (1943, also director) - Viktor - Dirigent
- Johann (1943) - Kammerdiener Johann Schmidt / Bauunternehmer Hans Pietschmann
- The Song of the Nightingale (1944, also director) - Der Sekretär
- Es fing so harmlos an (1944, also director) - Bonifatius 'Boni' Zeck
- Hazugság nélkül (1946) - Ladislaus
- Renee XIV (1946, uncompleted)
- Wiener Melodien (1947, director, co-director: Hubert Marischka)
- Hin und her (1948, also director) - Peter Vogel
- Philine (also director, 1945/1949) - Benno Paradis - Tierstimmen-Imitator
- Liebesheirat (1949, also director) - Leo Flügel
- Nothing But Coincidence (1949) - Dr. Renatus Elmhorst
- By a Nose (1949) - Felix Rabe, Zeitungsfahrer
- Schuß um Mitternacht (1944/1950) - Schauspieler Roderich Halden
- Theodore the Goalkeeper (1950) - Theo Lubitz
- Jetzt schlägt's 13 (1950) - Diener Max
- Glück muß man haben (1950, also director) - Wimmerl, Reklamechef beim Zuckerl-König
- The Midnight Venus (1951) - Meister Anton
- Hilfe, ich bin unsichtbar (1951) - Fritz Sperling
- Durch Dick und Dünn (1951, also director) - Theodor Müller
- The Thief of Bagdad (1952) - Hadschi
- Shame on You, Brigitte! (1952) - Paul Fellmeier
- You Only Live Once (1952) - Robert Heinemann
- Heidi (1952) - Sebastian - Sesemann's servant
- Heute nacht passiert's (1953) - Studienrat Dr. Bräutigam
- The Postponed Wedding Night (1953) - Dr. Reinhold Zibelius
- The Daughter of the Regiment (1953) - Colonello
- Secretly Still and Quiet (1953) - Theo
- Hooray, It's a Boy! (1953) - Prof. Waldemar Weber
- Räubergeschichte (1954, TV Movie) - Johannes Gerstner
- Heidi and Peter (1955) - Sebastian
- How Do I Become a Film Star? (1955, also director) - Paul Kubisch
- When the Alpine Roses Bloom (1955) - Dr. Krüger
- Die Wirtin zur Goldenen Krone (1955, also director) - Blackwell
- And Who Is Kissing Me? (1956) - Theo Lingen
- Ein tolles Hotel (1956) - August Birnstiel
- Das Liebesleben des schönen Franz (1956) - Dr. Erwin Hacker, Rechtsanwalt
- Opera Ball (1956) - Philipp, Diener bei Dannhauser
- My Aunt, Your Aunt (1956) - Theo Müller
- The Model Husband (1956) - Jakob Wieler
- Where the Lark Sings (1956) - René Valentin
- Vater macht Karriere (1957) - Schneidermeister Titus Hasenklein
- August der Halbstarke (1957) - August Rums, Schnapsfabrikant
- The Schimeck Family (1957) - Anton Kaltenbach
- Die Unschuld vom Lande (1957) - Werner Sturm
- Mit Rosen fängt die Liebe an (1957) - Tom Hossfeld
- Drei Mann auf einem Pferd (1957) - Mäcki
- Egon der Frauenheld (1957) - Landstreicher Egon / Falscher Bobby Bellmann / Richtiger Bobby Bellmann
- The Legs of Dolores (1957) - Theobald Schreyer, Finanzier
- Almenrausch and Edelweiss (1957) - Kammerdiener Leo Amadeus Schulze
- Twelfth Night (1958, TV Movie) - Malvolio
- Trees Are Blooming in Vienna (1958) - Herr Schindler
- A Song Goes Round the World (1958) - Himmel
- Die Sklavenkarawane (1958) - Sir David Lindsay
- Eine Reise ins Glück (1958) - Tabarelli - Notar in Nipozzano
- Die gute Sieben (1959, TV Movie) - Roberto Rossi
- The Night Before the Premiere (1959) - Karl Schmitt
- Der Löwe von Babylon (1959) - Sir David Lindsay
- Hinter den sieben Gleisen (1959) - Herr Fliegenschild - Triangelspieler (uncredited)
- The Goose of Sedan (1959) - Oberst Graf von Tuplitz
- Pension Schöller (1960) - Professor Schöller
- Sie können's mir glauben (1960, TV Movie, also director) - H.F. Pheeming
- A Woman for Life (1960) - Ganove #1
- Der Teufel hat gut lachen (1960) - Hoteldirektor
- Die Kassette (1961, TV Movie) - Heinrich Krull
- Pichler's Books Are Not in Order (1961) - Pichler
- Schule der Gattinnen (1961, TV Movie, also director) - Robert Carruche
- The Model Boy (1963) - Prof. Dr. Liebreich
- Das alte Hotel (1963, TV Series, 6 episodes) - Studienrat Sesselbein
- Minna von Barnhelm (1964, TV Movie) - Riccaut de la Marlinière
- Tonio Kröger (1964) - Knaak
- Kolportage (1964, TV Movie) - Baron Barrenkrona
- Don Juan oder Die Liebe zur Geometrie (1965, TV Movie) - Pater Diego
- Die fromme Helene (1965) - Onkel Nolte
- Schwarzer Peter (1966, TV Movie) - Der Sterndeuter
- The Great Happiness (1967) - Ronald
- The Heathens of Kummerow (1967) - Sanftleben
- Der Vogelhändler (1968, TV Movie) - Professor Würmchen
- Donaugeschichten (1968–1970, TV Series, 13 episodes) - Theo Lampe
- Zur Hölle mit den Paukern (1968) - Dr. Gottlieb Taft
- Wenn die kleinen Veilchen blühen (1968, TV Movie)
- Herbst (1968, TV Movie) - Graf Dingelstädt
- Zum Teufel mit der Penne (1968) - Studienrat Dr. Taft
- Twelfth Night (1968, TV Movie) - Malvolio
- Königin einer Nacht (1969, TV Movie) - Dr. Hermann Frank
- Pepe, der Paukerschreck (1969) - Dr. Gottlieb Taft
- Christoph Kolumbus oder Die Entdeckung Amerikas (1969, TV Movie) - König Ferdinand
- Hurra, die Schule brennt! (1969) - Oberstudiendirektor Dr. Taft
- We'll Take Care of the Teachers (1970) - Oberstudiendirektor Dr. Taft / Gotthold Emmanuel Taft
- Die Feuerzangenbowle (1970) - Professor Crey
- Wer zuletzt lacht, lacht am besten (1971)
- Who Laughs Last, Laughs Best (1971) - Theo Frobenius
- Tante Trude aus Buxtehude (1971) - Pauli
- Morgen fällt die Schule aus (1971) - Oberstudiendirektor Dr. Taft
- Hilfe, die Verwandten kommen (1971) - Onkel Theo
- Wenn mein Schätzchen auf die Pauke haut (1971) - Direktor Bercelius
- Ball im Savoy (1971, TV Movie) - Archibald
- The Mad Aunts Strike Out (1971) - Dr. Theo Schatz
- Betragen ungenügend! (1972) - Oberstudiendirektor Taft
- Hauptsache Ferien (1972) - Herr Kannenberg
- Always Trouble with the Reverend (1972) - Bischof
- So'n Theater (1973, TV Movie) - Eugéne Labotte
- Orpheus in der Unterwelt (1973, TV Movie) - Styx
- Die Powenzbande (1974, TV Mini-Series) - Bürgermeister Dattel
- Hochzeitsnacht im Paradies (1974, TV Movie) - Bastian
- The Moonstone (1974, TV Mini-Series) - Sergeant Cuff
- Im Hause des Kommerzienrates (1975, TV Movie) - Medizinalrat Bär
- Hoftheater (1975, TV Series) - Intendant Baron von Krombholz
- Tristan (1975, TV Movie) - Dr. Leander
- Beschlossen und verkündet (1975, TV Series, Episode: "Jean") - Kammerdiener Jean
- Damals wie heute (1975, TV Movie) - Zeitgenosse
- The Secret Carrier (1975) - Dr. Thoms
- Klimbim (1976, TV Series, Episode: "Die Klempner kommen") - Klemptner
- Lady Dracula (1977) - Theo Marmorstein
- Pariser Geschichten (1977, TV Series, Episode: "Der unbequeme Wasserträger") - Joseph Chiffonet
- Kleine Geschichten mit großen Tieren (1978, TV Movie) - Chef III
- Zwei himmlische Töchter (1978, TV Series, 2 episodes) - Graf Jehan von Hoftenstein / James Bond 007 / Sherlock Holmes
- Unsere heile Welt – Kleine Schule für große Leute (1980, TV Mini-Series) - (final appearance)

Short films

- Ins Blaue hinein (1931) - Prokurist Spitz
- Mein Name ist Lampe (1932)
- Nur ein Viertelstündchen (1932)
- Welle 4711 (1933) - Sendeleiter
- Meine Frau – seine Frau (1933) - Diener
- Wie werde ich energisch? (1933) - Herr Knöllchen
- Gutgehendes Geschäft zu verkaufen (1933) - Wahrsager Meier
- Die Goldgrube (1933) - Josef, Kellner in der »Goldgrube«
- Schlagerpartie (1934)
- Herr oder Diener? (1934) - Heinz Udo von Zickezack
- Die Abschieds-Symphonie (1934) - Thomasini
- Wie Eulenspiegel zu Marburg den Landgrafen malte (1936, also director) - Till Eulenspiegel
- Wie Eulenspiegel sich einmal erbot, zu fliegen (1936, also director) - Till Eulenspiegel
- Wie Eulenspiegel ein Urteil spricht (1936, also director) - Till Eulenspiegel
- Wie Eulenspiegel den Neunmalweisen Rede und Antwort steht (1936, also director) - Till Eulenspiegel

=== Films based on plays by Theo Lingen ===
- Was wird hier gespielt?, directed by Theo Lingen (1940, based on the play Was wird hier gespielt?)
- L'attore scomparso, directed by Luigi Zampa (1941, based on the play Was wird hier gespielt?)
- Johann, directed by Robert A. Stemmle (1943, based on the play Johann)
