= Hans Ledersteger =

Austrian art director

- Born: 26 February 1898; Vienna, Austro-Hungarian Empire
- Died: 13 October 1971 (aged 73); Bad Ischl, Austria
- Occupation: Art Director
- Years active: 1926-1959 (film)

Hans Ledersteger (1898–1971) was an Austrian art director who worked for many years in the German film industry. While mainly employed in Germany, he occasionally also worked in other countries such as Italy and his native Austria including on some post-war Heimatfilm. He worked on around eighty films as Art Director or production designer during his career. He was married to the actress Irmgard Alberti. Their daughter was the actress Barbara Valentin.

== Selected filmography ==
- Schweik in Civilian Life (1927)
- The Woman of Yesterday and Tomorrow (1928)
- Marriage (1928)
- The Missing Wife (1929)
- The Midnight Waltz (1929)
- Madame Bluebeard (1931)
- Viennese Waltz (1932)
- A Woman Between Two Worlds (1936)
- The Love of the Maharaja (1936)
- The Charm of La Boheme (1937)
- Darling of the Sailors (1937)
- The Jumping Jack (1938)
- Hotel Sacher (1939)
- Judgement Day (1940)
- Voice of the Heart (1942)
- My Summer Companion (1943)
- Nothing But Coincidence (1949)
- By a Nose (1949)
- Kissing Is No Sin (1950)
- Furioso (1950)
- A Thousand Red Roses Bloom (1952)
- Ave Maria (1953)
- Come Back (1953)
- A Musical War of Love (1953)
- Master of Life and Death (1955)
- Marriages Forbidden (1957)
- Hula-Hopp, Conny (1959)

== Bibliography ==
- Fritsche, Maria. Homemade Men In Postwar Austrian Cinema: Nationhood, Genre and Masculinity . Berghahn Books, 2013.
