= Hans Moser (actor) =

Austrian actor

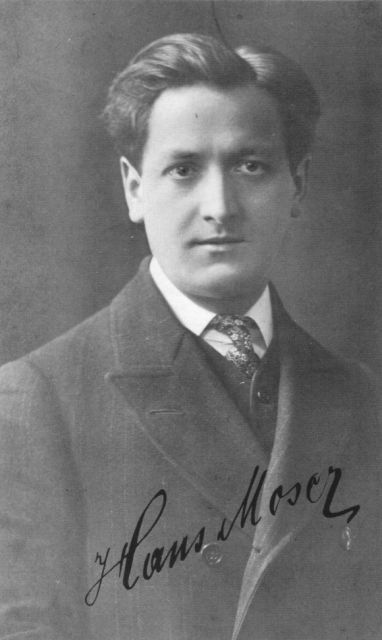
- Moser, ca. 1910
- Born: Johann Julier; 6 August 1880; Vienna, Austria-Hungary
- Died: 19 June 1964 (aged 83); Vienna, Austria
- Occupation: Actor
- Years active: 1918–1964

Hans Moser (6 August 1880 – 19 June 1964) was an Austrian actor who, during his long career, from the 1920s up to his death, mainly played in comedy films. He was particularly associated with the genre of the Wiener Film. Moser appeared in over 150 films.

== Biography ==
Born Johann Julier in Vienna, Moser very often portrayed the man in the street, typically someone else's subordinate – servant, waiter, porter, shopkeeper, coachman, petty bureaucrat, etc. Also always he played honest, moral and well-intentioned people who, unable to keep cool and think clearly in crucial situations, get themselves and everyone around them into trouble. As the father of a beautiful daughter – often widowed – he was the stubborn one who realizes only at the end of the movie, when all cases of mistaken identity have been cleared up and all secrets are revealed, that he has been terribly wrong all the time.

Moser was particularly known for mumbling indistinctly for comic effect rather than pronouncing words and sentences clearly, and also for failing to finish his sentences – which, combined with his moderate Viennese dialect, made it hard for non-native speakers of Austrian German to understand what he was saying.

In Moser's comedy films, Paul Hörbiger, Theo Lingen, Oskar Sima, and Annie Rosar were some of his congenial partners. However Moser was also a serious actor, especially on the stage and, towards the end of his life, on television. In many musical films, Moser can also be heard interpreting a Wienerlied, more likely than not at a Heuriger.

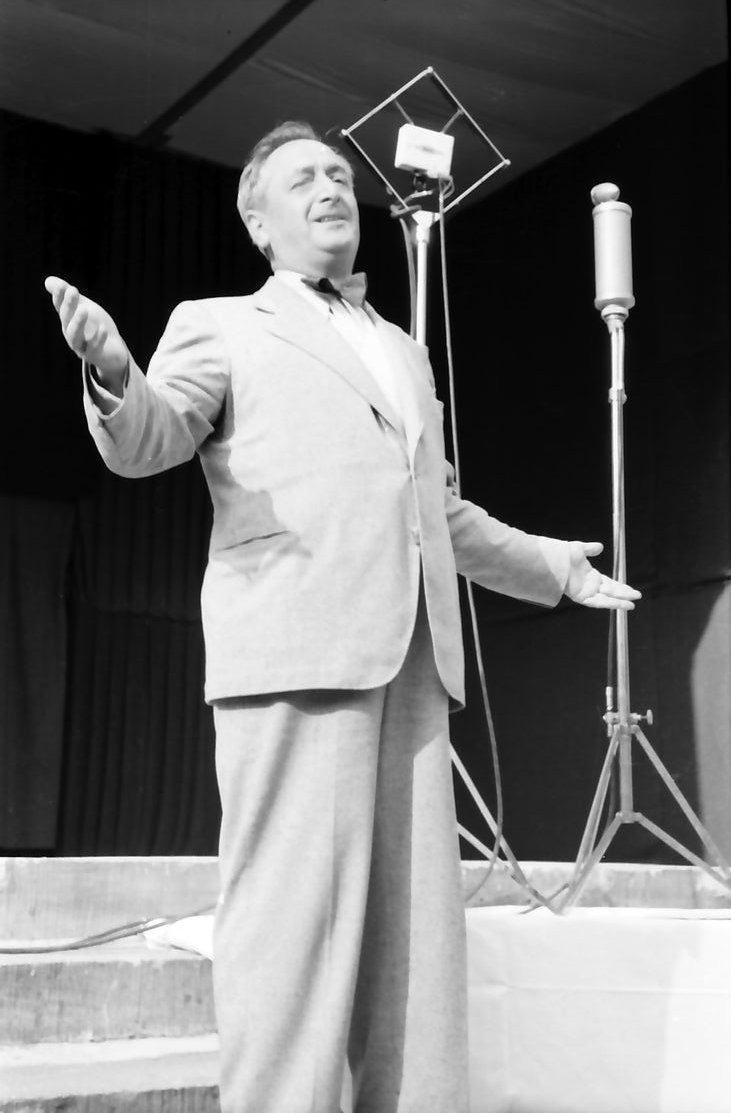
Moser performing in 1942

During the Nazi regime, Moser refused to divorce his Jewish wife Bianca Hirschler, despite pressure to do so. Bianca was eventually forced to emigrate from Hungary and survived the Holocaust there, sheltered by the popularity of her husband, whom the Nazis wanted to keep acting. In late 1944, with the end of the war and the Nazi era in hindsight, Bianca moved back to her husband in Vienna.

Hans Moser died in Vienna in 1964, aged 83. His continuing popularity is attested to by the fact that his style of speaking is still being parodied, often by very young entertainers.

== Select filmography ==
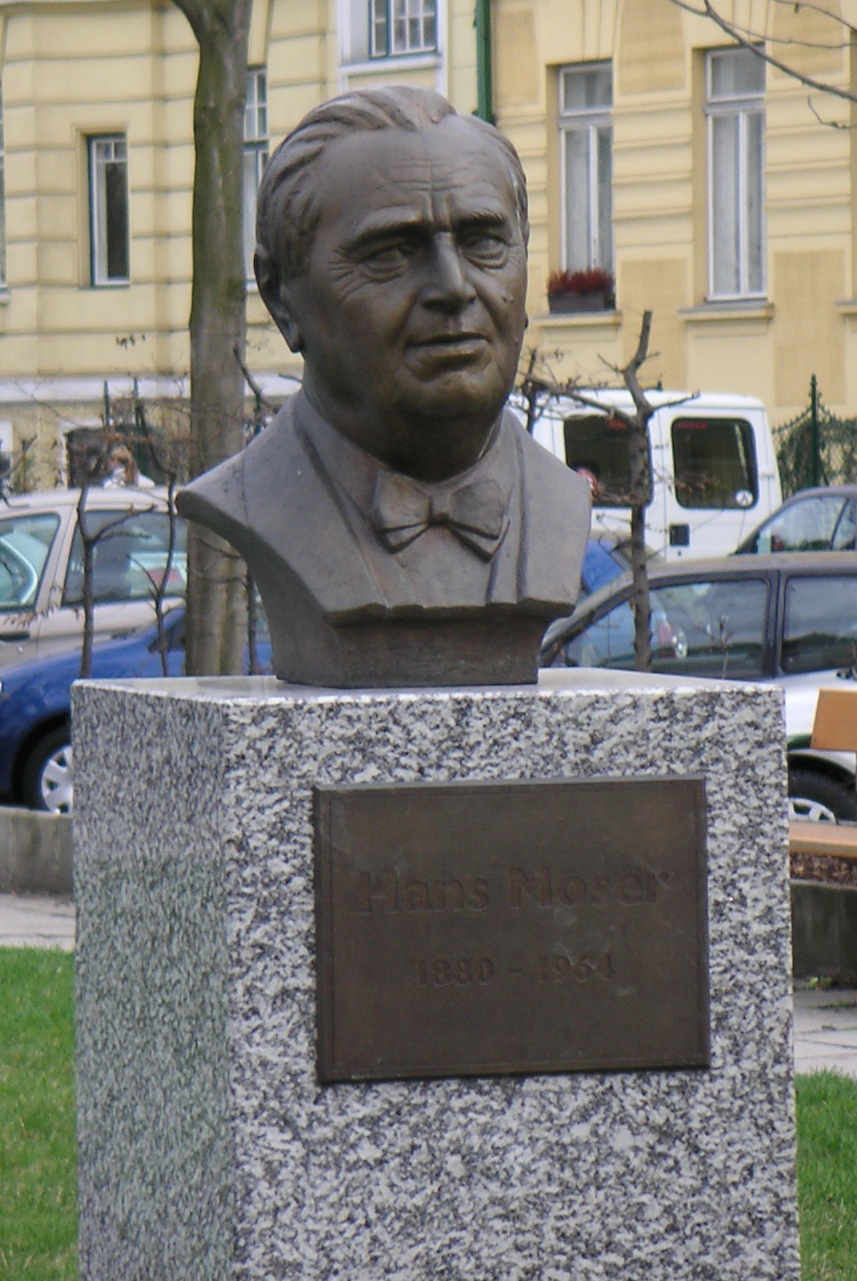
A bust of Moser in Hans Moser Park in Hietzing

- The Tales of Hoffmann (1923)
- The City Without Jews (1924, based on the novel by Hugo Bettauer)
- Red Heels (1925)
- Grandstand for General Staff (1926)
- Madame Dares an Escapade (1927)
- The Family without Morals (1927)
- Darling of the Gods (1930)
- Money on the Street (1930)
- Marriage with Limited Liability (1931)
- No Money Needed (1932)
- Madame Wants No Children (1933)
- Gently My Songs Entreat (1933)
- The Young Baron Neuhaus (1934)
- Spring Parade (1934)
- Polish Blood (1934)
- The Secret of Cavelli (1934)
- Frasquita (1934)
- Eva (1935)
- The Schimeck Family (1935)
- Suburban Cabaret (1935)
- Winter Night's Dream (1935)
- The World's in Love (1935)
- Heaven on Earth (1935)
- Circus Saran (1935)
- Last Stop (1935)
- A Hoax (1936)
- Das Gäßchen zum Paradies (1936)
- Hannerl and Her Lovers (1936)
- Ungeküsst soll man nicht schlafen gehn (1936, alongside Liane Haid)
- Fräulein Veronika (1936)
- Confetti (1936)
- Court Theatre (1936)
- The Unexcused Hour (1937)
- Der Mann, von dem man spricht (1937)
- Mother Song (1937)
- The Missing Wife (1937)
- My Son the Minister (1937)
- Little County Court (1938)
- The Scoundrel (1939)
- Anton the Last (1939)
- Opera Ball (1939)
- Stars of Variety (1939)
- The Unfaithful Eckehart (1940)
- My Daughter Lives in Vienna (1940)
- Vienna Tales (1940)
- Roses in Tyrol (1940, alongside Johannes Heesters)
- Love is Duty Free (1941)
- To Be God One Time (1942)
- Vienna Blood (1942)
- Black on White (1943)
- Abenteuer im Grand Hotel (1943)
- Carnival of Love (1943)
- Mask in Blue (1943)
- Schrammeln (1944)
- Viennese Girls (1945, released 1949)
- Renee XIV (1946, uncompleted)
- Der Hofrat Geiger (1947)
- The Singing House (1948)
- By a Nose (1949)
- Jetzt schlägt's 13 (1950)
- Kissing Is No Sin (1950)
- Theodore the Goalkeeper (1950)
- Hello Porter (1952)
- Shame on You, Brigitte! (1952)
- Rose of the Mountain (1952)
- Hello Porter (1952)
- Dutch Girl (1953)
- To Be Without Worries (1953)
- The Uncle from America (1953)
- The Three from the Filling Station (1955)
- The Congress Dances (1955)
- Yes, Yes, Love in Tyrol (1955)
- As Long as the Roses Bloom (1956)
- Opera Ball (1956)
- My Aunt, Your Aunt (1956)
- Emperor's Ball (1956)
- And Who Is Kissing Me? (1956)
- The Twins from Zillertal (1957)
- Hello Taxi (1958)
- Geschichten aus dem Wienerwald (TV play, 1961, based on the play Tales from the Vienna Woods by Ödön von Horvath)
- Mariandl (1961)
- Die Fledermaus (1962, playing the non-singing role of Frosch, the drunken jailer)
- Leutnant Gustl (1963, TV film)
