= List of Austrian films of the 1930s =

A list of films produced in the Cinema of Austria in the 1930s ordered by year of release. For an alphabetical list of articles on Austrian films see Category:Austrian films.

== 1930 ==
Title	Director	Cast	Genre	Note
1930
The Deed of Andreas Harmer	Alfred Deutsch-German	Oskar Marion, Tala Birell, Attila Hörbiger	Crime	
Money on the Street	Georg Jacoby	Georg Alexander, Franz Schafheitlin	Romance	Sascha-Film/Felsom-Film

== 1931 ==
Title	Director	Cast	Genre	Note
1931
Die große Liebe (The Great Love)	Otto Preminger	Hansi Niese, Attila Hörbiger, Betty Bird	Romance	Allianz Filmproduktion/E.M.L.K./Weissman Tonfilm
Justizmaschine (Justice Machine)		Karl Farkas		
Madame Bluebeard	Conrad Wiene	Lil Dagover, Harry Frank	Drama	
Storm in a Water Glass	Georg Jacoby	Hansi Niese, Renate Müller	Comedy	Co-production with Germany
The Uncle from Sumatra	Gyula Szöreghy	Wolf Albach-Retty, Mary Kid, Rina Marsa	Comedy	
Unter den Dächern von Wien (Under the Roofs of Vienna)		Karl Farkas		
Wiener Zauberklänge (Magic Sounds of Vienna)	Robert A. Reich	Hertha von Haentjens, Wolf Albach-Retty, Alt-Wiener Bund	Musical	Robert Müller Film

== 1932 ==
Title	Director	Cast	Genre	Note
1932
Die vom 17er Haus (The People from the 17th House)	Artur Berger		Science Fiction	produced for the Social Democratic Party of Austria for the Landtag elections of 1932
The Prince of Arcadia	Karl Hartl	Willi Forst, Liane Haid	Romance	Co-production with Germany
Sehnsucht 202 (Longing 202)	Max Neufeld	Magda Schneider, Fritz Schulz	Drama	Cine-Allianz Tonfilmproduktions GmbH (Germany)/Deutsch-Österreichischer Film
Three on a Honeymoon	Erich Schmidt	Brigitte Helm, Oskar Karlweis	Comedy	
You Don't Forget Such a Girl	Fritz Kortner	Willi Forst, Dolly Haas	Romantic comedy	Co-production with Germany

== 1933 ==
Title	Director	Cast	Genre	Note
1933
Adventures on the Lido	Richard Oswald	Alfred Piccaver	Musical comedy	Pan-Film
The Burning Secret	Robert Siodmak	Alfred Abel, Hilde Wagener	Drama	Co-production with Germany
La Chanson d'une nuit	Anatole Litvak	Jan Kiepura, Magda Schneider	Musical	Austrian/German co-production
Ecstasy	Gustav Machatý	Hedy Lamarr, Aribert Mog, Leopold Kramer	Drama	Elektafilm (Czechoslovakia) Czech/Austrian co-production
Gently My Songs Entreat	Willi Forst	Mártha Eggerth, Luise Ullrich, Hans Jaray, Hans Moser	Biography	Cine-Allianz Tonfilmproduktions GmbH
Grand Duchess Alexandra	Wilhelm Thiele	Maria Jeritza, Paul Hartmann, Leo Slezak	Operetta	Projektograph Film
The Happiness of Grinzing	Otto Kanturek	Iván Petrovich, Gretl Theimer, Alfred Gerasch	Drama	Shot in Czechoslovakia
Invisible Opponent	Rudolf Katscher	Paul Hartmann, Oskar Homolka, Peter Lorre	Drama	Robert-Müller-Film/Sascha-Film/Pan-Film
Judgment of Lake Balaton	Werner Hochbaum	Gyula Csortos, Maria Mindzenty	Drama	
König Pausole (King Pausole)	Alexis Granowsky	Emil Jannings, Josette Day	Operetta	Films Sonores Tobis (France)/Algra-Film
Liebelei (Flirtation)	Max Ophüls	Paul Hörbiger, Magda Schneider	Romance	Elite-Tonfilm-Produktion; set in Vienna but made in Berlin
The Rakoczi March	Steve Sekely		Drama	City Film (Germany) Austrian-Hungarian co-production
Our Emperor	Jacob Fleck, Luise Fleck	Georg Alexander, Karl Ehmann, Susi Lanner	Comedy	Neue Hegewald Film
Voices of Spring	Pál Fejös	Adele Kern, S.Z. Sakall, Oskar Karlweis	Musical	

== 1934 ==
Title	Director	Cast	Genre	Note
1934
Frasquita	Carl Lamac	Jarmila Novotná, Hans-Heinz Bollmann, Heinz Rühmann	Operetta	Atlantis-Film
Karneval und Liebe (Carnival and Love)	Carl Lamac	Rudolf Carl, Lien Deyers, Hans Moser		Pan-Film
Maskerade (Masquerade; known in English as "Masquerade in Vienna")	Willi Forst	Paula Wessely, Anton Walbrook, Olga Chekhova, Hans Moser		
Opernring (Opera Ring)	Carmine Gallone	Jan Kiepura, Friedl Czepa	Musical comedy	Gloria-Film (Germany)/Horus-Film
Peter	Henry Koster	Franciska Gaal	Musical comedy	Universal Pictures (USA)/Hunnia Filmstúdió (Hungary) US/Hungarian/Austrian co-production
The Secret of Cavelli	Erich Engel	Rudolf Forster, Angela Salloker, Hans Homma, Hans Moser		Tobis-Sascha/A.B.C.-Film (Germany)
Spring Parade	Géza von Bolváry	Paul Hörbiger, Franciska Gaal, Wolf Albach-Retty	Operetta	Universal Pictures Austria
Tales from the Vienna Woods	Georg Jacoby	Magda Schneider, Wolf Albach-Retty, Leo Slezak	Musical comedy	Mondial-Film

== 1935 ==
Title	Director	Cast	Genre	Note
1935
The Affairs of Maupassant	Henry Koster	Lili Darvas, Hans Jaray, Attila Hörbiger, S. Z. Sakall	Biographical	Astra-Film/Panta-Film
Ball at the Savoy	Steve Sekely	Gitta Alpar, Rosy Barsony, Hans Jaray	Operetta	
Circus Saran	E. W. Emo	Leo Slezak, Hans Moser, Carl Schenstrøm, Harald Madsen, Ilona Massey	Comedy	
The Cossack and the Nightingale	Phil Jutzi	Jarmila Novotna, Iván Petrovich, Rudolf Klein-Rogge	Romance/Thriller	
Csardas	Jacob Fleck, Luise Fleck, Walter Kolm-Veltée	Max Hansen, Irène Zilahy	Comedy	Terra-Film
Dance Music	Johann Alexander Hübler-Kahla	Liane Haid, Gusti Huber	Drama	
Dreams of Love	Heinz Hille	Franz Herterich, Olga Chekhova, Erika Dannhoff	Historical	Co-production with Hungary
Episode	Walter Reisch	Paula Wessely, Karl Ludwig Diehl	Wiener Film	Viktoria-Film
The Eternal Mask	Werner Hochbaum	Mathias Wieman, Peter Petersen	Drama	Co-production with Switzerland
Everything for the Company	Rudolf Meinert	Oskar Karlweis, Felix Bressart, Otto Wallburg	Comedy	
Heaven on Earth	E.W. Emo	Heinz Rühmann, Hans Moser, Theo Lingen, Ilona Massey	Comedy	
Her Highness Dances the Waltz	Max Neufeld	Irén Ágay, André Mattoni	Musical	Co-production with Czechoslovakia
Eva	Johannes Riemann	Magda Schneider, Heinz Rühmann, Hans Söhnker	Musical	
Immortal Melodies	Heinz Paul	Alfred Jerger, Maria Paudler, Lizzi Holzschuh	Historical	
Last Love	Fritz Schulz	Albert Bassermann, Michiko Tanaka	Drama	
Little Mother	Henry Koster	Franciska Gaal, Friedrich Benfer	Comedy	Co-production with Hungary
... nur ein Komödiant (... Just a Comedian)	Erich Engel	Rudolf Forster, Christl Mardayn, Paul Wegener	Historical / political	Horus-Film
Romance	Herbert Selpin	Christl Mardayn, Carl Esmond	Drama	
Suburban Cabaret	Werner Hochbaum	Mathias Wieman, Luise Ullrich	Musical	
Sylvia und ihr Chauffeur (Sylvia and her Chauffeur)	Johann Alexander Hübler-Kahla	Olga Chekhova, Gusti Huber	Musical	Cine-Central Film Wien
The White Horse Inn	Carl Lamac	Christl Mardayn, Hermann Thimig, Jarmila Novotná	Musical	
The World's in Love	Viktor Tourjansky	Mártha Eggerth, Leo Slezak	Musical	

== 1936 ==
Title	Director	Cast	Genre	Note
1936
Catherine the Last	Henry Koster	Franciska Gaal, Hans Holt	Musical comedy	Universal Pictures (USA)/Universal-Film (Austria)
Confetti	Hubert Marischka	Hans Holt, Leo Slezak, Friedl Czepa	Comedy	
Court Theatre	Willi Forst	Werner Krauss, Olga Chekhova, Hans Moser	Drama	
The Emperor's Candlesticks	Karl Hartl	Sybille Schmitz, Karl Ludwig Diehl	Adventure	
The Fairy Doll	E.W. Emo	Magda Schneider, Paul Hörbiger, Wolf Albach-Retty	Romance	
Flowers from Nice	Augusto Genina	Erna Sack, Friedl Czepa	Musical comedy	
Girls' Dormitory	Géza von Bolváry	Raoul Aslan, Angela Salloker, Erika von Thellmann	Drama	
Hannerl and Her Lovers	Werner Hochbaum	Albrecht Schoenhals, Hans Moser	Comedy	
Harvest	Géza von Bolváry	Paula Wessely, Attila Hörbiger	Romance	
Heut' ist der schönste Tag in meinem Leben (Today Is The Most Beautiful Day of My Life)	Richard Oswald	Joseph Schmidt, Felix Bressart, Otto Wallburg	Musical comedy	Globe-Film
His Daughter is Called Peter	Willy Schmidt-Gentner	Karl Ludwig Diehl, Traudl Stark, Olga Chekhova	Drama	
The Postman from Longjumeau	Carl Lamac	Carl Esmond, Rose Stradner	Musical comedy	Co-production with Switzerland
Rendezvous in Vienna	Victor Janson	Magda Schneider, Wolf Albach-Retty, Lizzi Holzschuh	Musical	
Shadows of the Past	Werner Hochbaum	Luise Ullrich, Gustav Diessl	Drama	
Shipwrecked Max	Fritz Schulz, Sigurd Wallén	Max Hansen, Gull-Maj Norin, Brita Appelgren	Drama	Co-production with Sweden
Silhouettes	Walter Reisch	Luli Deste, Annie Markart, Fred Hennings	Drama	
Singende Jugend (Singing Youth)	Max Neufeld	Wiener Sängerknaben, Hans Olden, Ferdinand Mayerhofer	Musical	
Thank You, Madame	Carmine Gallone	Jan Kiepura, Friedl Czepa	Musical	
Ungeküsst soll man nicht schlafen gehn (You Shouldn't Go To Sleep Unkissed)	E. W. Emo	Hans Moser, Heinz Rühmann, Theo Lingen, Liane Haid	Comedy	Projektograph-Film

== 1937 ==
Title	Director	Cast	Genre	Note
1937
The Charm of La Boheme	Géza von Bolváry	Jan Kiepura, Mártha Eggerth	Opera	Intergloria Film
Darling of the Sailors	Hans Hinrich	Traudl Stark, Wolf Albach-Retty, Richard Romanowsky	Comedy	
Escape to the Adriatic	Eugen Schulz-Breiden	Rolf Wanka, Lizzi Holzschuh	Drama	
Florentine	Karel Lamac	Paul Hörbiger, Geraldine Kate	Comedy	
The Missing Wife	E.W. Emo	Paul Kemp, Lucie Englisch, Hans Moser	Comedy	
Premiere	Géza von Bolváry	Zarah Leander, Attila Hörbiger, Karl Martell	Musical comedy	Gloria-Film
The Priest from Kirchfeld	Jakob Fleck, Luise Fleck	Hans Jaray, Hansi Stork	Drama	Excelsior Film
The Unexcused Hour	E.W. Emo	Anton Edthofer, Hans Moser, Dagny Servaes	Comedy	

== 1938 ==
Title	Director	Cast	Genre	Note
1938 (Since 12 March 1938 as part of Nazi Germany)
Immer wenn ich glücklich bin..! (Always When I am Happy..!)	Carl Lamac	Mártha Eggerth, Lucie Englisch, Philip Dorn	Musical comedy	Projektograph Film Oskar Gluck
The Jumping Jack	Karlheinz Martin	Hilde Krahl, Wolf Albach-Retty, Philip Dorn	Comedy	
The Optimist	E.W. Emo	Viktor de Kowa, Henny Porten, Gusti Huber	Comedy	
Roxy and the Wonderteam	Johann von Vásáry	Rosy Barsony, Hans Holt	Sports musical	
Thirteen Chairs	E. W. Emo	Heinz Rühmann, Hans Moser	Musical comedy	Emo-Film

== 1939 ==
Title	Director	Cast	Genre	Note
1939 (as part of Nazi Germany)
Anton the Last	E. W. Emo	Elfriede Datzig, Hans Moser	Comedy	Emo-Film/Wien-Film
Hotel Sacher	Erich Engel	Sybille Schmitz, Willy Birgel, Hedwig Bleibtreu	Spy film	Mondial-Film
Immortal Waltz	E. W. Emo	Paul Hörbiger, Maria Andergast	Musical comedy	Wien-Film
Linen from Ireland	Heinz Helbig	Irene von Meyendorff, Rolf Wanka	Propaganda film	Styria-Film/Wien-Film
A Mother's Love	Gustav Ucicky	Käthe Dorsch, Wolf Albach-Retty		Wien-Film
Opera Ball	Géza von Bolváry	Marte Harell, Paul Hörbiger, Hans Moser	Musical opera	Terra-Film
Woman in the River	Gerhard Lamprecht	Hertha Feiler, Attila Hörbiger	Comedy	Wien-Film
