= My Love Came Back =

- Theatrical release poster
- Directed by: Curtis Bernhardt
- Screenplay by: Ivan Goff; Robert Buckner; Earl Baldwin
- Based on: Episode; 1935 film by Walter Reisch
- Produced by: Hal B. Wallis
- Starring: Olivia de Havilland; Jeffrey Lynn
- Cinematography: Charles Rosher
- Edited by: Rudi Fehr
- Music by: Heinz Eric Roemheld
- Production company: Warner Bros. Pictures
- Distributed by: Warner Bros. Pictures
- Release date: July 13, 1940 (United States)
- Running time: 85 minutes
- Country: United States
- Language: English

My Love Came Back is a 1940 American comedy-drama film directed by Curtis Bernhardt and starring Olivia de Havilland, Jeffrey Lynn, Eddie Albert, and Jane Wyman. Based on the 1935 Austrian film Episode written and directed by Walter Reisch, the film is about a gifted young violinist who considers leaving a prestigious music academy to play in a jazz band to earn money. The academy's new president—a distinguished wealthy patron of the arts—convinces her to stay after secretly arranging a scholarship for her out of his own pocket, and the two begin attending concerts together. Complications arise when he asks his young business manager to take his place at one of the concerts. The film is notable for Heinz Eric Roemheld's musical direction and Ray Heindorf's unique swing orchestral arrangements of classical pieces. My Love Came Back was released by Warner Bros. Pictures in the United States on July 13, 1940.

== Plot ==
A beautiful young violinist named Amelia Cornell is a student at the prestigious Brissac Academy of Music in New York City. Unable to support her mother on her meager scholarship stipend, she is forced to provide music lessons in her spare time—something strictly forbidden by the school and enforced zealously by the dean of the school, Dr. Kobbe. Frustrated by her financial constraints and at being treated like a child by the dean, Amelia decides to leave the academy and join a jazz group led by her fellow student and swing bandleader Dusty Rhodes.

Meanwhile, after seeing Amelia perform at a concert, a distinguished wealthy patron of the arts, Julius Malette, finally accepts the academy's offer to make him president of the school—an offer inspired by Julius' wealth and influence. When he learns that Amelia is planning to leave the academy for financial reasons, Julius—who has a crush on the much younger violinist—secretly arranges for a second scholarship that will allow her to continue her studies. After Amelia meets her patron, the kind and gentlemanly president sends her a phonograph player and records, and escorts her to concerts to broaden her musical experience.

One evening, Julius is unable to attend a concert with Amelia and sends his young business manager, Tony Baldwin, to the concert hall to explain his absence. In the coming days, Tony and Amelia begin to fall in love, but Tony does not reveal his feelings, believing that Amelia is his boss's mistress.

The budding relationship between Tony and Amelia is further complicated when Julius' brash son Paul discovers that Tony has been mailing company checks to Amelia, unaware that these "scholarship" checks were mailed at his father's request. When Paul accuses Tony of misappropriating company funds, Tony protects his boss with his silence. Later, Paul sees his Julius entering Amelia's apartment, he believes that his father is being unfaithful to his mother. He apologizes to Tony and thanks him for trying to shield his family from the sordid news. When Paul tells Tony that Julius is with Amelia, Tony decides not to see Amelia again, nor answer her calls. His distrust is reinforced when he learns that the checks sent to Amelia have been cashed—he doesn't know that her friend Dusty "borrowed" the money.

Soon after, Julius and his wife organize a party and hire Amelia's roommate, Joy O'Keefe, and her boyfriend, Dusty Rhodes, to provide an evening of innovative classical and swing music. At the party, Amelia confesses everything to Mrs. Malette, and then plays swing violin with the band, shocking Julius and her teacher. The music critic at the party, however, is impressed, which gives her new style legitimacy. When Amelia learns that Dusty "borrowed" her check, and how that must have looked to Tony, she demands that Dusty explain to Tony what had been going on. Afterwards, Tony approaches Amelia in the garden, apologizes for his suspicions, and kisses her passionately.

== Cast ==
- Olivia de Havilland as Amelia Cornell
- Jeffrey Lynn as Anthony 'Tony' Baldwin
- Eddie Albert as Dusty Rhodes
- Jane Wyman as Joy O'Keefe
- Charles Winninger as Julius Malette
- Spring Byington as Mrs. Clara Malette
- Grant Mitchell as Dr. Kobbe
- William T. Orr as Paul Malette
- Ann Gillis as Valerie Malette
- S. Z. Sakall as Geza Peyer
- Charles Trowbridge as Dr. Downey, the music critic
- Mabel Taliaferro as Dowager
- William B. Davidson as Music Agent
- Nanette Vallon as Sophie, Malette's maid
- Sidney Bracey as Ransom, Malette's butler

== Production ==
=== Screenplay ===
My Love Came Back is based on the Austrian film Episode, which was directed by Walter Reisch and starred Paula Wessely and Karl Ludwig Diehl. Episode was in fact a sequel to another Austrian film, Maskerade—which was remade by MGM in 1935 under the title Escapade. The working titles for My Love Came Back were Episode, Men on Her Mind, and Two Loves Have I.

=== Soundtrack ===
- "Overture" from Orpheus in the Underworld (Jacques Offenbach) performed by the student orchestra
- "Hungarian Rhapsody No. 2 in C Sharp Minor" (Franz Liszt) played on a record, swing version performed by Dusty (piano) and Amelia (violin)
- "Long, Long Ago" (Thomas Haynes Bayley) played when Julius tells Clara he has to go out
- "Wedding March" from A Midsummer Night's Dream, Op. 61 (Felix Mendelssohn-Bartholdy) played on piano by Valerie and Paul
- "An der schönen, blauen Donau (On the Beautiful Blue Danube), Op. 314" (Johann Strauß) played at the Beaux Arts Ballroom, played by Clara (harp), Julius (bass violin), and Valerie and Paul (piano)
- "Pizzicato Polka" (Johann Strauß and Josef Strauß) played at the Beaux Arts Ballroom
- "Geschichten aus dem Wienerwald (Tales from the Vienna Woods), Op. 325" (Johann Strauß) played at the Beaux Arts Ballroom
- "Mazurka in G" (Henryk Wieniawski) played at the Beaux Arts Ballroom
- "Romantic Waltz" (Joseph Lanner) played at the Beaux Arts Ballroom
- "Ein Herz, ein Sinn (One Heart, One Mind), Op. 323" (Johann Strauß) played at the Beaux Arts Ballroom
- "Wein, weib und Gesang (Wine, Women and Song), Op. 333" (Johann Strauß) played at the Beaux Arts Ballroom
- "Nocturne No. 10 in A Flat, Op. 32 No. 2" (Frédéric Chopin) swing version played at the party
- "Violin Concerto in E Minor, Op. 64" (Felix Mendelssohn-Bartholdy) played at the party by Amelia (violin), swing version played by Dusty and his band
- "Neapolitan Nights" (J.S. Zamecnik) played on the accordion during the first restaurant scene
- "The Rose in Her Hair" (Harry Warren) played on the accordion during the second restaurant scene

== Critical response ==
In his review for The New York Times, Bosley Crowther gave the film a positive review, calling it "a featherlight frolic, a rollicking roundelay of deliciously pointed nonsense". Crowther praised Kurt Bernhardt for his directing the film "in a spirit of pure delight", and Ivan Goff, Robert Buckner, and Earl Baldwin for their effervescent writing. Crowther also praised the cast for their "gayly scampering performance", noting:

As the compromised young heroine of the show, Miss De Havilland plays the part with pace and wit. Mr. Lynn is briskly present, Eddie Albert is practically perfect as the young zany of swing who intermittently thinks of suicide. The rest of the cast is in excellent order. But as the elderly gentleman who feels his youth coming back Mr. Winninger almost steals the show. He's an innocent at heart, even in a naughty escapade.

Crowther concluded that the film was as "refreshing as a gin fizz on a hot day".

In the New Masses review, published on July 30, 1940, the reviewer wrote that the film takes the "comedy of mistaken intentions" genre and returns some of the "freshness and spontaneity" of the original idea. The review continues:

Under Kurt Bernhardt's direction the fable gets off to a slow start, gradually picks up momentum and humorous incident as it moves along. Most of the credit for the humor should go to Charles Winninger's effective handling of the old man Malette. He's a genuine comic ... neither overplays nor overmugs.
