= Der Postmeister =

1940 German film by Gustav Ucicky

- Directed by: Gustav Ucicky
- Written by: Gerhard Menzel
- Based on: The Station Master by Alexander Pushkin
- Produced by: Karl Hartl; Erich von Neusser
- Starring: Heinrich George; Hilde Krahl; Siegfried Breuer
- Cinematography: Hans Schneeberger
- Edited by: Rudolf Schaad
- Music by: Willy Schmidt-Gentner
- Production company: Wien Film
- Distributed by: UFA
- Release date: 24 April 1940
- Running time: 92 minutes
- Country: Nazi Germany
- Language: German

Der Postmeister (English: The Postmaster or The Stationmaster) is a 1940 Austrian-German drama film directed by Gustav Ucicky. Very loosely based on The Station Master, an 1831 short story from The Belkin Tales series by Alexander Pushkin, it was remade in 1955 as Dunja. An earlier adaptation was the French film Nostalgie (1938) with Harry Baur, directed by Victor Tourjansky.

The film's sets were designed by art directors Kurt Herlth and Werner Schlichting. It was produced in Austria during its occupation by Nazi Germany, by the Wien Film company, and distributed by UFA.

At the Venice Film Festival, Der Postmeister won the Mussolini Cup for best foreign film. Released during the Molotov–Ribbentrop Pact, it depicts Russians in a sympathetic light, unlike their portrayals in such films as Frisians in Peril before or GPU after.

== Plot ==
The daughter of a stationmaster falls in love with a cavalry captain. He persuades her to run away with him to St. Petersburg, but she realizes there that he never intended to marry her.

== Cast ==
- Heinrich George as Der Postmeister
- Hilde Krahl as Dunja
- Siegfried Breuer as Rittmeister Minskij
- Hans Holt as Fähnrich Mitja
- Ruth Hellberg as Elisawetha
- Margit Symo as Mascha
- Erik Frey as Sergej
- Alfred Neugebauer as Gutsbesitzer
- Franz Pfaudler as Knecht Pjotr
- Leo Peukert as Oberst
- Reinhold Häussermann as Schneider
- Auguste Pünkösdy as Wirobowa

== See also ==
- The Stationmaster (1925)
