= Black on White (1943 film) =

1943 comedy film

- Directed by: E. W. Emo
- Starring: Hans Moser; Paul Hörbiger
- Music by: Nico Dostal
- Production company: Wien-Film
- Release date: 29 October 1943
- Running time: 1h 22min
- Country: Germany
- Language: German

Black on White (German: Schwarz auf weiß) is a 1943 comedy film directed by E. W. Emo.

== Cast ==
- Hans Moser as Eduard Streusler, the baker
- Paul Hörbiger as Prof. Klaus
- Elfriede Datzig as Nelly, the kid
- Hans Holt as Heinz
- Annie Rosar as Mrs. Streusler
- Alfred Neugebauer as Morawetz
- Walter Janssen as Dr. Eichhorn
- Udo Saldow as nephew Peterl
- Otto Glaser as Geselle Johann
- Fritz Imhoff as Schuldiener
- Gisa Wurm as Tante Luise
