= Karl Kneidinger =

Austrian actor (1882–1952)

- Born: 30 August 1882; Vienna, Austria-Hungary (now Austria)
- Died: 14 April 1952 (aged 69); Vienna, Austria
- Other name: Carl Kneidinger
- Occupations: Actor, theater director
- Relatives: Lola Urban Kneidinger (sister); Berta Türk (sister in-law)

Karl Kneidinger (30 August 1882 – 14 April 1952), was an Austrian stage and film actor, and a theater director.

== Biography ==
Karl Kneidinger was born 30 August 1882 in Vienna, Austria-Hungary (now Austria), the son of actress Marie Kneidinger (1857–1908), and actor Rudolf Kneidinger (1862–1935). His sister was actress Lola Urban Kneidinger. His parents had been active in the Raimund Theater, in the Mariahilf district of Vienna. By the time he was a teenager, he was acting in stage productions.

In 1944, Kneidinger was included in the Gottbegnadeten list, a list of artists considered crucial to the culture of Nazi Germany by the Reich Ministry of Public Enlightenment and Propaganda.

== Filmography ==
- Konrad Hartls Lebensschicksal(1918), directed by Maurice Armand Mondet
- The Fourth Commandment (1920 film) (German: Das vierte Gebot), silent film directed by Richard Oswald
- The Gold Rats (1923) (German: Die Goldratten), directed by Herr. van der Lye
- Befehl zur Ehe (1928), directed by Max Neufeld
- Das Mädel aus der Wachau (1928), directed by Franz Hoffermann
- Die Jugend am Scheideweg (1929), directed by Conrad Wiene
- Wiener Herzen (1930), directed by Fred Sauer
- Money on the Street (1930) (German: Geld auf der Straße), directed by Georg Jacoby; (uncredited)
- Storm in a Water Glass (1931) (German: Sturm im Wasserglas), directed by Georg Jacoby
- Purpur und waschblau (1931), directed by Max Neufeld
- Die große Liebe (1931), directed by Otto Preminger
- When You're Young, the World Belongs to You (1934) (German: Wenn du jung bist, gehört dir die Welt), directed by Richard Oswald
- Geschichten aus dem Wienerwald (1934), directed by Georg Jacoby
- Eva (1935), directed by Johannes Riemann
- A Mother's Love (1939 film), directed by Gustav Ucicky; as Lehrer
- Linen from Ireland (1939), directed by Heinz Helbig; as accountant
- A Little Night Music (1939 film), directed by Leopold Hainisch
- Love Is Duty Free (1941), directed by E. W. Emo
- Little Brothers Fine (1942) (German: Brüderlein Fein), directed by Hans Thimig
- The Freckle (1948), directed by Rudolf Carl; as Rusty, the postman

== Stage work ==
- Tschun Tschi (14 April 1930 – 18 September 1930) at Neues Wiener Schauspielhaus, Vienna
