= His Daughter is Called Peter =

His Daughter is Called Peter (German:Seine Tochter ist der Peter) may refer to:

- His Daughter is Called Peter (1936 film), an Austrian film directed by Heinz Helbig and Willy Schmidt-Gentner
- His Daughter is Called Peter (1955 film), an Austrian film directed by Gustav Fröhlich
