= Royal Hunt in Ischl =

1955 film directed by Hans Schott-Schöbinger

- Directed by: Hans Schott-Schöbinger
- Written by: Joe Taupe (novel); Rudolf L. Körner
- Produced by: Auguste Barth-Reuss
- Starring: Elma Karlowa; Herta Staal; Hans von Borsody
- Cinematography: Klaus von Rautenfeld
- Edited by: Herbert Taschner
- Music by: Karl Bette
- Production companies: Patria-Filmkunst-Produktion; Tonfilm GmbH
- Distributed by: Gloria Film
- Release date: 29 September 1955
- Running time: 105 minutes
- Countries: Austria; West Germany
- Language: German

Royal Hunt in Ischl (German: Hofjagd in Ischl) is a 1955 Austrian-West German historical comedy film directed by Hans Schott-Schöbinger and starring Elma Karlowa, Herta Staal and Hans von Borsody. It is also known by its West German title Two Hearts and a Throne (German: Zwei Herzen und ein Thron). It was shot at the Sievering Studios in Vienna and on location in the Dachstein Mountains, Hallstatt and Gosau. The film's sets were designed by the art directors Hertha Hareiter and Otto Pischinger.

== Cast ==
- Elma Karlowa as Nina Charlotta von Russland
- Herta Staal as Liesl
- Hans von Borsody as Eberhard von Preußen
- Margrit Aust as Wirtin zur Goldenen Gans
- Adrienne Gessner as Gräfin Lahousen
- Gunther Philipp as Kuno Möslacher
- Fritz Imhoff as General-Kommandant Köpnick
- Rudolf Vogel as Diener Charles
- Hans Olden as Graf Turm
- Herbert Hübner as Petrowsky
- Arnulf Schröder as Herr von Spree
- Rudolf Carl as Iwan
- Alfred Neugebauer as Oberförster
- Paul Löwinger as Wirt Möslacher Senior
- Joseph Egger as Peter von der Post

== Bibliography ==
- Fritsche, Maria. Homemade Men in Postwar Austrian Cinema: Nationhood, Genre and Masculinity. Berghahn Books, 2013.
