= Two Happy People =

1943 film

- Directed by: E. W. Emo
- Written by: Curt Wesse
- Starring: Magda Schneider; Wolf Albach-Retty; Oskar Sima; Hans Olden
- Cinematography: Karl Puth
- Edited by: Munni Obal
- Music by: Heinz Sandauer
- Production company: Wien-Film
- Release date: 15 January 1943
- Running time: 83 minutes
- Country: Austria (Part of Greater Germany)
- Language: German

Two Happy People (German: Zwei glückliche Menschen) is a 1943 comedy film directed by E. W. Emo and starring Magda Schneider, Wolf Albach-Retty, and Oskar Sima. The film was made by Wien-Film, a Vienna-based company set up after Austria had been incorporated into Greater Germany following the 1938 Anschluss.

The film's sets were designed by the art directors Erich Grave and Franz Berger.

== Premise ==
Two divorce lawyers' intense commitment to their work almost leads to the breakdown of their own marriage.

== Cast ==
- Magda Schneider as Käthe Strassen
- Wolf Albach-Retty as Werner Gottwald
- Oskar Sima as Krautstössl
- Hans Olden as Frey
- Charlott Daudert as Valerie Martelli
- Otto Treßler as Gerichtsvorsitzender
- Jane Tilden as Hilde Bollinger
- Georg Lorenz as Felix Baumgartner
- Wilma Tatzel as Mizzi
- Hans Unterkircher as Karl Sedelmaier
- Gisa Wurm as Frieda
- Harry Hardt as Versicherungsagent
- Alfred Neugebauer as Tepichhändler
- Richard Eybner as Vertreter der Bausparkasse
- Fritz Imhoff as Ein aufgeregter Hotelgast
- Hans Thimig
- Josef Menschik

== Bibliography ==
- Hake, Sabine (2001). Popular Cinema of the Third Reich. Austin: University of Texas Press. ISBN 978-0-292-73458-6.
