= Linen from Ireland =

1939 film

- Directed by: Heinz Helbig
- Written by: Stefan von Kamare; Harald Bratt; Philipp von Zeska
- Starring: Otto Treßler; Irene von Meyendorff; Friedl Haerlin
- Cinematography: Hans Schneeberger
- Music by: Anton Profes
- Production companies: Deutsche Styria Film; Wien Film
- Distributed by: Bavaria Film
- Release date: 16 October 1939
- Running time: 98 minutes
- Country: Germany
- Language: German

Linen from Ireland (German: Leinen aus Irland) is a 1939 German drama film directed by Heinz Helbig and starring Otto Treßler, Irene von Meyendorff, and Friedl Haerlin. It was part of an ongoing campaign of anti-Semitism in German cinema of the era, and was also intended to discredit the governance of the old Austro-Hungarian Empire. By the time of the film's release in October 1939, Britain and Germany were at war, so it was also useful in creating anti-British sentiment.

It was made as a co-production between the German company Bavaria Film and the Austrian Wien Film which had been created following the Anschluss of 1938. The film's sets were designed by the art directors Robert A. Dietrich and Artur Gunther.

== Plot ==
In 1909, in Bohemia, then part of the Austro-Hungarian Empire, the Jewish general manager of a large textile company imports cheaper linen from Ireland, intending to drive local manufacturers out of business, which would create mass unemployment among the skilled weavers. The company's elderly owner in Vienna is unaware of the scheme, but eventually it is exposed.

== Cast ==
- Otto Treßler, as Präsident Kettner
- Irene von Meyendorff as Lilly, seine Tochter
- Friedl Haerlin as Frau von Gebhardt
- Oskar Sima as Der Minister
- Georg Alexander as Freiherr v. Falsz-Pennwiel
- Hans Olden as v. Kalinski
- Tibor Halmay as Horvath v. Arpad-Fálvâ
- Rolf Wanka as Dr. Goll
- Karl Skraup, as Alois Hubermaier
- Siegfried Breuer as Dr. Kuhn
- Fritz Imhoff as Pollack
- Maria Olszewska as Frau von Kalinski
- Anny Kupfner as Wanda von Kalinski
- Ernst Arnold as Dr. Seligmann
- Richard Waldemar
- Robert Valberg as Adjutant des Ministers
- Rudolf Carl as Portier im Miniserium
- Karl Kneidinger, as Bieringen, the accountant for Hubermaier
- Ernst Nadherny
- Otto Schmöle as Nagel
- Wilhelm Sichra as Leinenweber
- Oskar Wegrostek as Wenzel, Leinenweber
- Oskar Werner as Hotelpage

== Production ==
Linen from Ireland was directed by Heinz Helbig and produced by Deutsche Styria Film and Wien-Film.

== Release ==
It was banned from being shown in Germany by the Allied High Commission after World War II.

== Works cited ==
- Kelson, John (1996). Catalogue of Forbidden German Feature and Short Film Productions held in Zonal Film Archives of Film Section, Information Services Division, Control Commission for Germany, (BE) (2 ed.). Greenwood Publishing Group. ISBN 0948911190.
