= My Daughter Lives in Vienna =

1940 film

- Dorit Kreysler and Elfriede Datzig
- German: Meine Tochter lebt in Wien
- Directed by: E. W. Emo
- Written by: Curt J. Braun; Fritz Koselka
- Produced by: Franz Antel; Karl Hartl; Erich von Neusser
- Starring: Elfriede Datzig; Hans Moser; O. W. Fischer
- Cinematography: Georg Bruckbauer
- Edited by: Munni Obal
- Music by: Heinrich Strecker
- Production company: Wien-Film
- Release date: 16 July 1940
- Running time: 85 minutes
- Country: Germany
- Language: German

My Daughter Lives in Vienna (German: Meine Tochter lebt in Wien) is a 1940 German comedy film of mistaken identities (comedy of errors) directed by E. W. Emo and starring Elfriede Datzig, Annie Rosar, Hans Moser, and O. W. Fischer.

Dialog and acting are fast paced before a somewhat serious backdrop of marital infidelity, parental authority, and lust with considerable wordplay ("Klaghofer"; "my daughter is my lost son") and cutting and performances. Wartime propaganda purposes are served by some sentimentality, a superficially harmonious ending, while explicit Nazi ideology is absent.

== Cast ==
- Elfriede Datzig as Gretl Klaghofer
- Hans Moser as Florian Klaghofer
- O. W. Fischer as Hauser Chauffeur
- Charlott Daudert as Ada de Niel
- Dorit Kreysler as Marga
- Hedwig Bleibtreu as Aunt Ottilie
- Hans Olden as Felix Frisch
- Theodor Danegger as Marga's father
- Annie Rosar as Kindermann, housekeeper
- Pepi Glöckner-Kramer
- Gisa Wurm
- Anton Pointner as Probst, Juwelier
- Erich Nikowitz
- Egon von Jordan as Helmuth Wittner
- Wilhelm Schich
