= Florentine (film) =

1937 film by Karel Lamač

- Directed by: Karel Lamač
- Starring: Paul Hörbiger; Geraldine Katt; Hans Holt; Rudolf Carl
- Release date: 1937
- Country: Austria
- Language: German

Florentine is a 1937 Austrian comedy film directed by Karel Lamac and starring Paul Hörbiger, Geraldine Katt, Hans Holt and Rudolf Carl.
