= The Fairy Doll =

1936 film

- Directed by: E.W. Emo
- Written by: Ralph Benatzky; Leon Laroche; Carl Lorens; Hanns Saßmann
- Based on: The Fairy Doll by Joseph Bayer
- Produced by: Rolf Eckbauer
- Starring: Adele Sandrock; Magda Schneider; Paul Hörbiger
- Cinematography: Eduard Hoesch; Hans Theyer
- Edited by: Lisbeth Neumann
- Music by: Ralph Benatzky
- Production company: Hade-Film
- Distributed by: Kiba Kinobetriebsanstalt
- Release date: 19 June 1936
- Running time: 85 minutes
- Country: Austria
- Language: German

The Fairy Doll (German: Die Puppenfee) is a 1936 Austrian romance film directed by E.W. Emo and starring Adele Sandrock, Magda Schneider and Paul Hörbiger. It is based on the 1888 ballet work by the same name composed by Josef Bayer, owing more to the score than the libretto. The film's sets were designed by the art director Julius von Borsody. It marked the screen debut of future star Hilde Krahl.

== Cast ==
- Adele Sandrock as Konstanze Gräfin Reiffersperg
- Magda Schneider as Komtess Felizitas - ihre Nichte
- Paul Hörbiger as Anton Freiherr von Kautzenbichl
- Wolf Albach-Retty as Alexander - sein Bruder
- Dagny Servaes as Gräfin Bernburg
- Lizzi Holzschuh as Fanny Heigl - Primaballerina
- Fritz Imhoff as Kommerzialrat Steindl
- Hilde Krahl as Heurigengast

== Bibliography ==
- Bock, Hans-Michael & Bergfelder, Tim. The Concise CineGraph. Encyclopedia of German Cinema. Berghahn Books, 2009.
- Von Dassanowsky, Robert. Screening Transcendence: Film Under Austrofascism and the Hollywood Hope, 1933-1938. Indiana University Press, 2018
