= Little County Court =

1938 film

- Directed by: Alwin Elling
- Written by: Otto Bielen; Erwin Kreker
- Based on: Little County Court by Otto Bielen
- Produced by: Adolf Elling
- Starring: Hans Moser; Ida Wüst; Lucie Englisch
- Cinematography: Hugo von Kaweczynski
- Edited by: Putty Krafft
- Music by: Will Meisel
- Production company: Astra-Film
- Release date: 10 November 1938
- Running time: 105 minutes
- Country: Germany
- Language: German

Little County Court (German: Kleines Bezirksgericht) is a 1938 German comedy film directed by Alwin Elling and starring Hans Moser, Ida Wüst and Lucie Englisch. It was shot at the Halensee Studios in Berlin. The film's sets were designed by the art directors Gabriel Pellon and Heinrich Richter.

== Synopsis ==
An overenthusiastic clerk working in a district court in a suburb of Vienna gives out free legal advice and is friends with Amanda Hopfstangl. He finds himself embroiled in a legal case in which she is one of the parties.

== Cast ==
- Hans Moser as Karl Haselhuber
- Ida Wüst as Elisabeth Pieringer
- Lucie Englisch as Amanda Hopfstangl
- Gusti Wolf as Mizzi, Pieringers Nichte
- Eduard Wesener as Willi Hickel
- Paul Otto as Der Bezirksrichter
- Erich Fiedler as Dr. Schartenreiter
- Rudolf Carl as Strassenmusikant Postl
- Fritz Imhoff as Strassenmusikant Blaschek
- Karl Hellmer as Brandler
- Jochen Hauer as Gustav Berger

== Bibliography ==
- Klaus, Ulrich J. Deutsche Tonfilme: Jahrgang 1938. Klaus-Archiv, 1988.
- Niven, Bill, Hitler and Film: The Führer's Hidden Passion. Yale University Press, 2018.
- Waldman, Harry. Nazi Films In America, 1933-1942. McFarland & Co, 2008.
