= Anuschka (film) =

1942 film directed by Helmut Käutner

- German film poster
- Directed by: Helmut Käutner
- Written by: Helmut Käutner; Axel Eggebrecht
- Based on: Anuschka by Georg Fraser
- Produced by: Gerhard Staab
- Starring: Hilde Krahl; Siegfried Breuer; Friedl Czepa
- Cinematography: Erich Claunigk
- Edited by: Ludolf Grisebach
- Music by: Bernhard Eichhorn
- Production company: Bavaria Film
- Distributed by: Bavaria Film
- Release date: 24 March 1942
- Running time: 101 minutes
- Country: Germany
- Language: German

Anuschka is a 1942 German historical drama film directed by Helmut Käutner, and starring Hilde Krahl, Siegfried Breuer and Friedl Czepa. It was shot at the Barrandov Studios in Prague and Cinecitta in Rome. Location filming took place in Carinthia. The film's sets were designed by art director Ludwig Reiber.

== Synopsis ==
In rural Moravia, Anuschka loses her family farm when her father dies heavily in debt. She takes up an offer to go to Vienna to work as a maid to the surgeon Felix von Hartberg who treated her father following an accident. However, his wife Eva is having an affair and when she gives her husband's gift of an expensive lighter to her lover, she allows Anuschka to wrongly take the blame.

== Cast ==
- Hilde Krahl as Anuschka Hordak
- Siegfried Breuer as Prof. Felix von Hartberg
- Friedl Czepa as Eva von Hartberg
- Rolf Wanka as Dr. Sascha Wendt
- Ellen Hille as Lina
- Anton Pointneras Leopold
- Beppo Schwaiger as Jaro Nowarek
- Elise Aulinger as Maria Nowarek
- Paula Menari as Frau Huber
- Fritz Odemar as Baron Fery
- Karl Etlinger as Lawyer Virag
- Lotte Lang as Mizzi, prostitute
- Oskar Höcker as Police Detective
- Michael von Newlinsky as Wendt's Manservant
- Herta Neupert as Young Woman who informs Anuschka of the fire
- Karl Hellmer
- Ludwig Auer
- Lucie Becker
- Marianne Doerwald
- Irma Evert
- Harry Hardt
- Georg Irmer
- Alfred Werner Koekh
- Irene Kohl
- Hans Kratzer
- Ruth Kruse
- Karin Luesebrink
- Anni Markart
- Franz Pfaudler
- Klaus Pohl
- Evan-Friedl Priehler
- Martha Salm
- Arnulf Schröder
- Maria Sigg as Flower-girl at Gypsy Cabaret
- Franz Stick as Pepi, manager of Faschingsball

== Bibliography ==
- Rentschler, Eric. The Ministry of Illusion: Nazi Cinema and Its Afterlife. Harvard University Press, 1996.
