= Josephine Wessely =

Austrian actress (1860–1887)

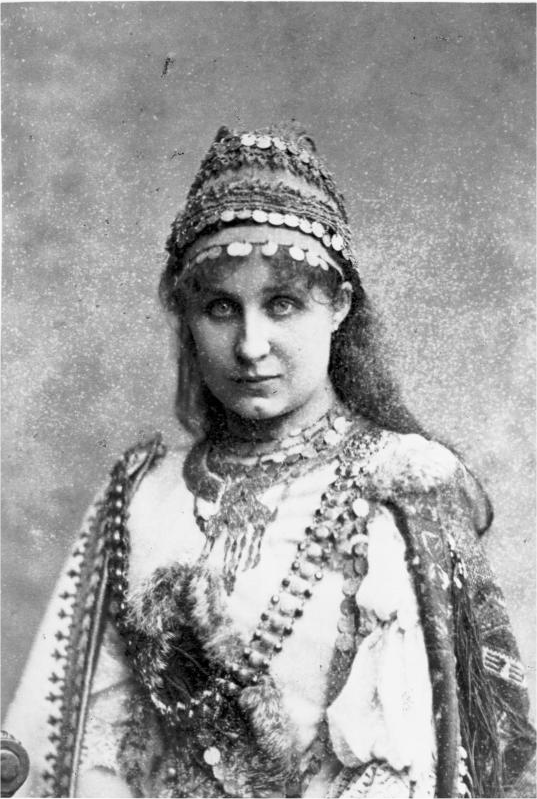
- Born: 18 March 1860; Vienna, Austrian Empire
- Died: 12 August 1887 (aged 27); Carlsbad, Austria-Hungary
- Occupation: Actress
- Years active: circa 1880s

Josephine Wessely (18 March 1860 – 12 August 1887) was an Austrian theatre actress.

Born in Vienna the daughter of a shoemaker, talented Wessely from about 1874 attended the drama school at the Gesellschaft der Musikfreunde conservatory. She gave her debut in 1876, performing as Luise in Schiller's Intrigue and Love at the Leipzig city theatre. She promoted her career by guest appearances in Berlin and Vienna, and in 1879 became a member of the Burgtheater ensemble receiving the honorific title of a "k.k. court actress" in 1884.

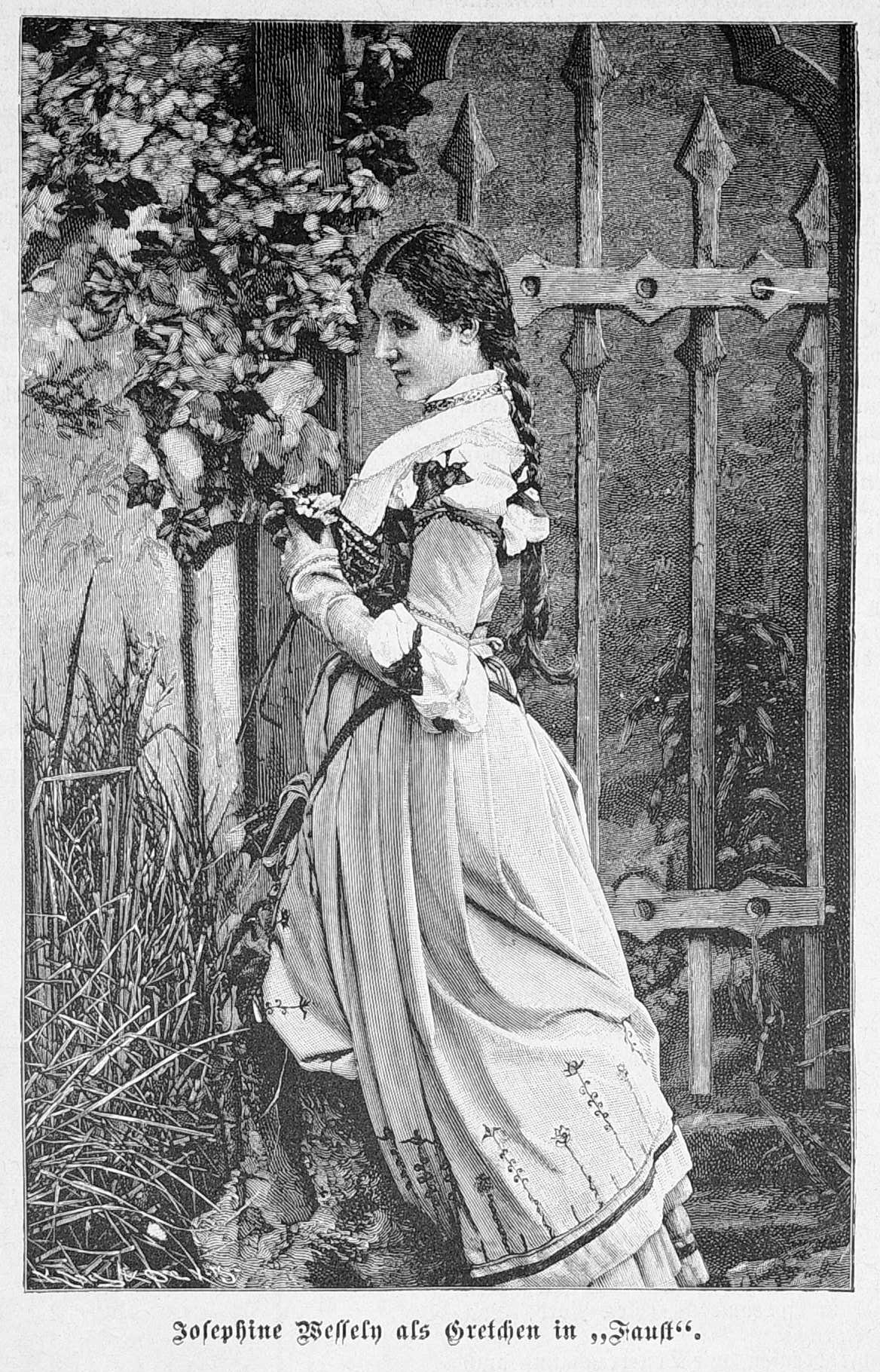
Wessely as Gretchen, Die Gartenlaube, 1887

She was the aunt of acclaimed Austrian actress Paula Wessely (1907–2000). Although there was an approximate forty-seven-year-age difference, they have been frequently been mistakenly considered sisters. Josephine Wessely's career was short but it had sufficient impact to make her an idol for her niece and other stage actors. Josephine Wessely was known for playing juvenile tragic roles. She gained recognition for playing Gretchen in Goethe's Faust, Klärchen in Egmont and Marie Beaumarchais in Clavigo, as well as for her performance as Lessing's Emilia Galotti.

Wessely died aged 27, probably from leukaemia taking a cure at Carlsbad, never knowing her niece. She is buried at the Hütteldorf cemetery in Vienna. A portrait of her by Eduard Charlemont is on display at the gallery in the Burgtheater foyer. In 1931, a street was named in her honor in Vienna-Meidling.
