= The White Dream =

1943 film

- German: Der weiße Traum
- Directed by: Géza von Cziffra
- Written by: Géza von Cziffra
- Produced by: Erich von Neusser
- Starring: Olly Holzmann; Elfriede Datzig; Wolf Albach-Retty
- Cinematography: Sepp Ketterer; Hans Schneeberger
- Edited by: Arnfried Heyne
- Music by: Anton Profes
- Production company: Wien Film
- Distributed by: Wien Film
- Release date: 5 October 1943
- Running time: 93 minutes
- Country: Austria (Part of Greater Germany)
- Language: German

The White Dream (German: Der weiße Traum) is a 1943 musical comedy film directed by Géza von Cziffra and starring Olly Holzmann, Elfriede Datzig and Wolf Albach-Retty. The film was made by Wien-Film, a Vienna-based company set up after Austria had been incorporated into Greater Germany following the 1938 Anschluss.

It was one of the most popular wartime German releases. In the year following 1945, it was still found by an American military survey to be among a group of very successful Nazi era entertainment films at the box office, well ahead of foreign imports.

== Cast ==
- Olly Holzmann as Liesl Strolz
- Elfriede Datzig as Ice-skater
- Wolf Albach-Retty as Ernst Eder
- Lotte Lang as Lu Panther
- Hans Olden as Director Schmoller
- Fritz Imhoff as Meister Strolz
- Oskar Sima as Josef Wildner
- Richard Eybner as Scherzinger
- Rudolf Carl as Toni
- Hans Schott-Schöbinger as Theo Berg
- Georg Lorenz as Franz
- Petra Trautmann as Gertie Kramer
- Otto Hartmann as Poldi
- Hans Kern as Bächlein
- Polly Koß as Frau Wulitsch
- Josef Menschik as Kugler - Theaterinspizient
- Alda Noni as Singer

== Bibliography ==
- Hake, Sabine. German National Cinema. Routledge, 2002.
