= Love Is Duty Free =

1941 film

Love is Duty Free
- Directed by: E. W. Emo
- Written by: Fritz Koselka
- Starring: Hans Moser; Susi Peter; Theodor Danegger; Hans Olden
- Cinematography: Georg Bruckbauer
- Music by: Hanns Elin; Max Niederberger
- Production company: Wien-Film
- Release date: 17 April 1941
- Country: Germany
- Language: German

Love is Duty Free (German: Liebe ist zollfrei) is a 1941 comedy film directed by E. W. Emo and starring Hans Moser, Susi Peter, and Theodor Danegger. The film was made by Wien-Film, a Vienna-based company set up after Austria had been incorporated into Greater Germany following the 1938 Anschluss. The film was intended to mock the First Austrian Republic and its democratic system of government as incompetent.

== Synopsis ==
The financially hard-pressed Austrian government have arranged a secret deal with the Swiss, but an officious Austrian customs officer is unaware of this and arrests the Swiss representatives in the belief that they are wanted criminals.

== Cast ==
- Hans Moser as Laurenz Hasenhüttl
- Susi Peter as Hasenhüttls Tochter
- Theodor Danegger as Schweizer Gesandter
- Hans Olden as Finanzminister
- Maria Eis as Frau des Finanzminister
- Else Elster as Geliebte des Finanzministers
- Hans Unterkircher as Minister Bouvier
- Oskar Sima as Bundeskanzler
- Heinrich Heilinger as Ministerialrat
- Erik Frey as Ministerialsekretär
- Fritz Imhoff as Pförtner
- Josef Egger as Amtsdiener
- Alfred Neugebauer as Amerikanischer Millionär
- Karl Skraup as Chefredakteur Grimsky
- Gisa Wurm as Stubenmädchen
- Robert Freitag as Schweizer Zollbeamter
- Hermann Erhardt as Polizeiwachtmeister
- Josef Eichheim as Wirt in Feldkirch
- Gertrud Wolle as Englische Touristin
- Karl Kneidinger

== Bibliography ==
- Hake, Sabine (2001). Popular Cinema of the Third Reich. Austin: University of Texas Press. ISBN 978-0-292-73458-6.
