= The Freckle =

1948 film

- Directed by: Rudolf Carl
- Written by: Helmut Kemmerl
- Produced by: August Diglas; Emmerich Hanus; Elfi von Dassanowsky
- Starring: Oskar Sima; Grete Zimmer; Fritz Imhoff
- Cinematography: Rudolf Icsey
- Edited by: Hanns Matula
- Music by: Oskar Wagner
- Production company: Belvedere Film
- Distributed by: International Film
- Release date: 21 August 1948
- Running time: 95 minutes
- Country: Austria
- Language: German

The Freckle (Hungarian: Der Leberfleck) is a 1948 Austrian romantic comedy film directed by Rudolf Carl and starring Oskar Sima, Grete Zimmer and Fritz Imhoff. The film's sets were designed by the art director Sepp Rothaur. It is also known by the alternative title The Immoral Inheritance (German: Die unmoralische Erbschaft).

== Cast ==
- Oskar Sima as Bürgermeister Oberlechner
- Liesl Andergast as Rosalia, seine Frau
- Rudolf Carl as Gemeindediener Hustinger
- Grete Zimmer as Seine Tochter Fanzi
- Fritz Imhoff as Unterberger, Wirt
- Mimi Stelzer as Anna, seine Frau
- Erich Dörner as Oberlehrer Magerl
- Lotte Neumayer as Nathalie, seine Frau
- Emmerich Arleth as Hofer, Delikatessenhändler
- Marianne Gerzner as Mitzi, seine Frau
- Hans Olden as Sommermann, Apoteker
- Susanne Engelhart as Klothilde, seine Braut
- Alfred Schnayder, as Krummöhrl, Notar
- Otto Loewe, as Dr. Krips, Arzt
- Alexander Trojan, as Albert
- Benno Smytt, as Mr. Smith, the American
- Waltraut Servi, as Kathi, waitress
- Karl Kneidinger, as Rusty, the postman
- Ena Valduga, as Marie, dream woman

== Bibliography ==
- Fritsche, Maria. Homemade Men in Postwar Austrian Cinema: Nationhood, Genre and Masculinity. Berghahn Books, 2013.
- Von Dassanowsky, Robert. Austrian Cinema: A History. McFarland, 2005.
