= Irene in Trouble =

1953 film

- Directed by: E. W. Emo
- Written by: Hans Nüchtern (novel); Lilian Belmont; Fritz Koselka; Hugo Maria Kritz; Ernst Waldbrunn
- Produced by: Heinz Nitsche
- Starring: Bruni Löbel; Friedl Czepa; Walter Giller
- Cinematography: Rudolf Sandtner; Oskar Schnirch
- Edited by: Hermine Diethelm
- Music by: Bojan Adamic
- Production companies: Helios-Filmproduktion; Triglav Film
- Distributed by: Sascha Film
- Release date: 14 August 1953
- Running time: 92 minutes
- Countries: Austria; Yugoslavia
- Language: German

Irene in Trouble (German: Wirbel um Irene) is a 1953 Austrian-Yugoslav romantic comedy film directed by E. W. Emo and starring Bruni Löbel, Friedl Czepa, and Walter Giller.

== Cast ==
- Bruni Löbel as Reni Romana (Irene)
- Friedl Czepa as Hedwig Romana
- Walter Giller as Dr. Konrad Berko
- Hans Olden as Peter Cirmann
- Susi Nicoletti as Vera, seine Frau
- Lola Urban-Kneidinger as Olga Rado
- Helli Servi as Hely Cirmann
- Rudolf Krismanek as Paul Marek
- Masa Slavec as Frl. Reis
- Ernst Waldbrunn as Julius
- Harry Hardt as Dr. Albert Klugwirt
- Erle Ganbac as Personalchef
- Alenka Svetel as 2. Direktionssekretärin
- Edith Meinel as Portiersfrau bei Dr. Berko
- Maks Furijan as Oberbuchhalter
- Mimi Stelzer as Dienstmädchen
- Drago Zupan as Portier

== Bibliography ==
- Fritsche, Maria (2013). Homemade Men in Postwar Austrian Cinema: Nationhood, Genre and Masculinity. New York: Berghahn Books. ISBN 978-0-85745-946-6.
