= Anton the Last =

1939 film

- Directed by: E. W. Emo
- Written by: Fritz Koselka
- Starring: Elfriede Datzig; Hans Moser; O. W. Fischer; Hans Adalbert Schlettow
- Cinematography: Karl Kurzmayer
- Music by: Heinz Sandauer
- Production company: Wien-Film
- Distributed by: Bavaria Film
- Release date: 30 November 1939
- Running time: 91 minutes
- Country: Germany
- Language: German

Anton the Last (German: Anton, der Letzte) is a 1939 comedy film directed by E. W. Emo and starring Elfriede Datzig, Hans Moser, and O. W. Fischer. The film was made by Wien-Film, a Vienna-based company set up after Austria had been incorporated into Greater Germany following the 1938 Anschluss.

== Cast ==
- Elfriede Datzig as Leni Lugauer
- Hans Moser as Anton, The Butler
- O. W. Fischer as Graf Willy Othmar
- Hans Adalbert Schlettow as Franz Lugauer
- Charlotte Ander as Baroness Clarisse
- Lina Woiwode as Therese Lugauer
- Franz Böheim as Johan, a Butler
- Gertrud Wolle as Baroness Serafine
- Mimi Stelzer as Kathi, The Cook
- Heinz Salfner as Graf Othmar
- Erich Nikowitz as Judge
- Norbert Rohringer
- Siegfried Breuer as Lawyer
- Robert Horky as Der Brandner Stoffl, Lenis Brautwerber
- Reinhold Häussermann as Gast bei Schlossführung
- Lia Pord
- Toni Prosch
- Johannes Roth as Gast bei der Schlossführung
- Paul Steidtner
- Johann Vesely

== Bibliography ==
- Hake, Sabine (2001). Popular Cinema of the Third Reich. Austin: University of Texas Press. ISBN 978-0-292-73458-6.
