= Fred Raul =

Austrian actor

Fred Raul (March 20, 1913 – August 25, 1985), born Alois Greschitz, was an Austrian actor of Hungarian ethnicity. He was best known for his marriage in 1968 to actress Marika Rökk, to whom he remained married until his death in 1985.

Raul was born in Allersdorf, Styria, then part of Austria-Hungary and now in Austria, and died in Baden bei Wien, Austria. He was buried at the Helenenfriedhof cemetery in Baden.

== Selected filmography ==
- We've Just Got Married (1949)
- At the Green Cockatoo by Night (1957)
- Doctor Crippen Lives (1958)
- The Night Before the Premiere (1959)
- Heute gehn wir bummeln (1961)
