= The Fall of Valentin =

1951 film

- Directed by: Paul Löwinger
- Written by: Gretl Löwinger (play); Karl Leiter; August Rieger
- Produced by: Ernest Müller
- Starring: Sepp Rist; Rudolf Carl; Joseph Egger
- Cinematography: Károly Kurzmayer
- Edited by: Renate Knitschke
- Music by: Gerhard Bronner
- Production company: Schönbrunn-Film
- Distributed by: Union-Film
- Release date: 30 November 1951
- Running time: 90 minutes
- Country: Austria
- Language: German

The Fall of Valentin (German: Valentins Sündenfall) is a 1951 Austrian comedy film directed by Paul Löwinger and starring Sepp Rist, Rudolf Carl and Joseph Egger. It was made at the Hernals Studios in Vienna while location shooting took place around the city including at the Prater. The film's sets were designed by the art director Gustav Abel. It premiered in Munich in West German on 30 November, its Austrian debut took place over a month later on 4 January 1952. It is based on a folk play by Gretl Löwinger, who also appeared in the film.

== Synopsis ==
The unmarried farmer Christian is in great demand as a potential husband in the village. However, he rejects the choice of marriage with two local girls Vroni and Petronella. To seek revenge they disguise themselves and get jobs as farmhands working for him. Christian's younger brother Valentin then falls in love with one of them.

== Cast ==
- Sepp Rist as Christian
- Paul Löwinger as Valentin
- Gretl Löwinger as Vroni
- Liesl Löwinger as Petronella
- Rudolf Carl as Svoboda
- Martin Costa as Aigner
- Joseph Egger as Blasius Rogner
- Sepp Löwinger as Sepp
- Hans Olden as Chalupetz
- Lydia Rauch as Hilde

== Bibliography ==
- Fritsche, Maria. Homemade Men in Postwar Austrian Cinema: Nationhood, Genre and Masculinity. Berghahn Books, 2013.
