= We've Just Got Married =

- Directed by: Hans Effenberger
- Written by: Hans Effenberger
- Produced by: Karl Steurer
- Starring: Lotte Lang; Maria Eis; Hans Olden
- Cinematography: Herbert Brunnbauer; Ludwig Kerner; Herbert Thallmayer
- Edited by: Munni Obal
- Music by: Ernst Hans Richter
- Production company: Standard-Film
- Distributed by: Favorit Film
- Release date: 29 July 1949
- Country: Austria
- Language: German

We've Just Got Married (German: Wir haben eben geheiratet) is a 1949 Austrian comedy film directed by Hans Effenberger and starring Lotte Lang, Maria Eis and Hans Olden.

== Plot ==
Mary de la Mamarides was once a celebrated operetta diva who, however, claims to have always married the wrong man in her three marriages. Now she has two sons of marriageable age, Uli and Jim, whom she adores, and fears nothing more than that they too might fall into the "marriage trap." What their mother doesn't know is that her two sons have just married themselves, and to keep this fact hidden from their domineering mother, the two young men must go to great lengths. Thanks to secrecy and countless deceptions and tricks—including a friend pretending to be dead—the genre's typical farcical entanglements and misunderstandings soon ensue.

== Cast ==
- Lotte Lang as Didi
- Maria Eis as Frau Geduldig
- Hans Olden as Max
- Ida Russka as Mary de la Mamarides, ehemalig. Operettendiva
- Heliane Bei as Daisy
- Richard Lorenz as James & Jim
- Fritz Neubard as Juan
- Fred Raul as Uli
- Mimi Shorp as Betty Black, Soubrette
- Ernst Neuhardt
- Louis Stroh
- Eva Symo
- Hermann Wallbrück

== Bibliography ==
- Fritsche, Maria. Homemade Men in Postwar Austrian Cinema: Nationhood, Genre and Masculinity. Berghahn Books, 2013.
