= Oskar Schnirch =

Austrian cinematographer

- Born: 19 September 1902; Bautsch; Austro-Hungarian Empire
- Died: 5 April 1995 (aged 92); Munich, Bavaria; Germany
- Occupation: Cinematographer

Oskar Schnirch (1902–1995) was an Austrian cinematographer. He worked on over eighty films during the Weimar, Nazi and West German eras.

== Selected filmography ==
- Lady Windermere's Fan (1935)
- Confetti (1936)
- The Empress's Favourite (1936)
- Darling of the Sailors (1937)
- Mystery About Beate (1938)
- The Jumping Jack (1938)
- Secret Mission (1938)
- Uproar in Damascus (1939)
- Marriage in Small Doses (1939)
- Hurrah! I'm a Father (1939)
- Escape in the Dark (1939)
- Venus on Trial (1941)
- Happiness is the Main Thing (1941)
- Front Theatre (1942)
- A Waltz with You (1943)
- Maresi (1948)
- The Singing House (1948)
- Vagabonds (1949)
- Wedding with Erika (1950)
- Furioso (1950)
- Shame on You, Brigitte! (1952)
- The Day Before the Wedding (1952)
- The Spendthrift (1953)
- Irene in Trouble (1953)
- Everything for Father (1953)
- Diary of a Married Woman (1953)
- Guitars of Love (1954)
- The Red Prince (1954)
- Mozart (1955)
- Music, Music and Only Music (1955)
- The Immenhof Girls (1955)
- Santa Lucia (1956)
- The Domestic Tyrant (1959)
- Everybody Loves Peter (1959)
- 12 Angry Men (1963, TV film)

== Bibliography ==
- Giesen, Rolf. Nazi Propaganda Films: A History and Filmography. McFarland & Co., 2003.
