= When You're Young, the World Belongs to You =

- German: Wenn du jung bist, gehört dir die Welt
- Directed by: Richard Oswald
- Starring: Joseph Schmidt; Otto Treßler; Lilliane Dietz
- Release date: 1934
- Country: Austria
- Language: German

When You're Young, the World Belongs to You (German: Wenn du jung bist, gehört dir die Welt) is a 1934 Austrian comedy film directed by Richard Oswald and starring Joseph Schmidt, Otto Treßler and Lilliane Dietz. Along with Adventures on the Lido, it was denied a permit to be shown in German cinemas because Oswald was deemed an enemy of National Socialism.

== Cast ==
- Joseph Schmidt as Carlo
- Otto Treßler as Rossani
- Lilliane Dietz as Lisetta
- Ernst Arndt as village organist
- Walter Edthofer as Roberto
- Frida Richard as Theresa
- S. Z. Sakall as Beppo
- Gerd Oswald as Giuseppe, horse boy
- Artuir Preuß as Tenor
- Richard Eybner as Theater director
- Karl Kneidinger
