= Das Geheimnis des Goldpokals =

1918 film by Rudolf Stiassny

Das Geheimnis des Goldpokals (English translation: The Secret of the Gold Cup) is a 1918 Austrian silent crime film by Rudolf Stiassny, starring Otto Tressler.

== Plot ==
Countess Leonie von Holstorff and her beau Baron Prinitz intend to get married soon. When the groom-to-be toasts the celebration with the family's antique gold cup, he collapses shortly afterwards. Someone has clearly poisoned the young man with hydrogen cyanide, as the autopsy later shows. A detective named Walters is commissioned by the Holstorff family to investigate, and the family's doctor, Dr. Amelius, is supposed to support him. Walters soon discovers a family secret: the Holstorffs have a problem with the young Magda. She is the old count's younger daughter, who is considered to be mentally ill and is strongly influenced by Dr. Amelius, with whom Magda is head over heels in love. Apparently the family doctor treats the girl using hypnosis. The mention of the assassination attempt on her deceased future brother-in-law immediately makes Magda hyper-nervous. Dr. Amelius' rather rude rejection of Magda's advances, because he loves Leonie, causes Magda to fall into ever deeper depression. She tells the detective that shortly before the poisoning, Dr. Amelius himself fetched the gold cup from Holstorff's cupboard. This makes Amelius the focus of Walters' investigation as the beneficiary of Baron Prinitz's death. The detective wants to use a trick to expose Amelius as the perpetrator. Countess Leonie is brought on board for this. She is supposed to make the family doctor believe that she is as in love with him as he is with her. Walters hands the doctor the gold cup filled with wine during a snack. When Amelius thinks he has seen a powder dissolving in the wine, he collapses. This exposes him as the perpetrator, leading to his conviction for poisoning Baron Prinitz.
