= Paul Löwinger =

Austrian actor, theatre manager and writer

Paul Löwinger (10 November 1904 – 17 December 1988) was an Austrian actor, theatre manager and writer. While still a child, he performed on his parents' stage, the Löwinger Bühne. In 1938, they were probably the first theatre ensemble which performed in front of television cameras. The same year he married Liesl Meinhard. The couple had three children: Guggi Löwinger, Sissy Löwinger and Paul Löwinger. He took over the Löwinger Bühne in 1947. Löwinger wrote numerous comedies and well known plays. His plays were often broadcast on television. He also took part in numerous German and Austrian films, such as "Zyankali" (1947) or "Kaiserball" (1956) and became internationally popular. His daughter Sissy managed the family-owned theatre until her death on 25 September 2011. Löwinger was buried (like his wife) at the Wiener Zentralfriedhof.

== Selected filmography ==
- His Daughter is Called Peter (1936)
- The Fall of Valentin (1951)
- Royal Hunt in Ischl (1955)
- Emperor's Ball (1956)
- The Beautiful Master (1956)
- Tim Frazer and the Mysterious Mister X (1964)
- My Father, the Ape and I (1971)
