= Dir zuliebe =

1944 film

- Directed by: Martin Frič
- Written by: Ursula Bloy; Philipp von Zeska
- Starring: Hans Holt
- Cinematography: Jan Roth
- Release date: 17 November 1944
- Running time: 91 minutes
- Country: Germany
- Language: German

Dir zuliebe is a 1944 German comedy film directed by Martin Frič.

== Cast ==
- Hans Holt as Martin Mansfeld
- Winnie Markus as Maria Mansfeld - seine Frau
- Clementia Egies as Magda - ihre Schwester
- Richard Häussler as Lorenz von Niel
- Erika von Thellmann as Mama Korb
- Paul Kemp as Karl Sinn
- Ernst Legal
- Hermine Ziegler
- Charlotta Tremlová as Singer
