= Maria Eis =

Austrian actress

- Born: 22 February 1896; Prague, Austro-Hungarian Empire
- Died: 18 December 1954 (aged 58); Vienna, Austria

Maria Eis (22 February 1896 – 18 December 1954) was an Austrian actress of stage and screen.

Between 1918 and 1923, Eis performed on stage at the Neue Wiener Bühne (New Vienna stage), the Renaissancebühne (Renaissance stage) and the Kammerspielen. Later, she moved to Hamburg, where she played at the Thalia Theater and at the Deutschen Schauspielhaus until 1932. When she returned to Vienna, she joined an ensemble group at the Burgtheatre (City Theatre), where she played character and tragic roles up until her death. Her performances, such as Elizabeth I, Lady Macbeth, Sappho, Medea, and Iphigenia are considered noteworthy.

Eis also acted in a number of successful films after 1935.

A section of road in front of the former Karl Michael Ziehrer House has been renamed "Maria Eis Gasse" in her memory.

== Partial filmography ==
- Episode (1935)
- Mirror of Life (1938)
- Love is Duty Free (1941)
- The Trial (1948)
- Mysterious Shadows (1949)
- Duel with Death (1949)
- We've Just Got Married (1949)
- Maria Theresa (1951)
- The Spendthrift (1953)
- Franz Schubert (1953)
- Anna Louise and Anton (1953)
- The Eternal Waltz (1954)
