= Knall and Fall as Imposters =

- German film poster
- German: Knall und Fall als Hochstapler
- Directed by: Ulrich Bettac; Hubert Marischka
- Written by: Walter Forster; Jo Hanns Rösler
- Produced by: Alfred Stöger
- Starring: Hans Richter; Rudolf Carl; Curd Jürgens
- Cinematography: Walter Tuch
- Edited by: Hermine Diethelm
- Music by: Hans Lang
- Production companies: Arena-Film; Wiener Mundus-Film
- Distributed by: Herzog Filmverleih
- Release date: 21 November 1952
- Running time: 84 minutes
- Countries: Austria; West Germany
- Language: German

Knall and Fall as Imposters (German: Knall und Fall als Hochstapler) is a 1952 Austrian-German comedy film directed by Ulrich Bettac and Hubert Marischka and starring Hans Richter, Rudolf Carl and Curd Jürgens. It was followed by a 1953 sequel Knall and Fall as Detectives. It was shot at the Sievering Studios in Vienna and on location across the city. The film's sets were designed by the art director Fritz Jüptner-Jonstorff.

== Plot ==
Two rural men are picked at random for parts in a film production in which they are to play a millionaire and his chauffeur. After an accident while shooting a scene, the car they are in runs out of control and ends up crashing into a sanatorium. The director, believing that a real millionaire has arrived at the financially struggling establishment, puts them up. They are forced for a while to live as imposters until matters are eventually resolved.

== Cast ==
- Hans Richter as Knall
- Rudolf Carl as Fall
- Curd Jürgens as John Vandergold
- Friedl Czepa as Direktorium des Sanatoriums
- Waltraut Haas as Bettina Brandtner
- Ilka Windish as Irene Dahlen
- Ulrich Bettac as Regisseur
- Viktor Braun
- Heinz Conrads as Scheich
- Peter Gerhard
- Fritz Imhoff as Portier
- Franz Marischka as Aufnahmeleiter
- Hans Olden as Bankvorsteher
- Peter W. Staub as Studienrat Hegetschweiler
- Hermann Laforet as Produzent
- Ady Berber as Bademeister
- Johannes Roth as Sambu, Diener
