= Wien-Film =

Austrian film company

Wien-Film GmbH ("Vienna Film Limited") was a large Austrian film company, which in 1938 succeeded the Tobis-Sascha-Filmindustrie AG (Sascha Film Company) and lasted until 1985. Until 1945 the business was owned by the Cautio Trust Company (Cautio Treuhandgesellschaft), a subsidiary of the German Reichsfilmkammer, and was responsible for almost the entire production of films in the territory of the Ostmark, as Austria was called at that time.

== History ==
=== Nazi Era ===
The German Anschluss of Austria in 1938 put an end to the country's independent film production. The German-Austrian Tobis-Sascha-Filmindustrie AG, which had already been sold, under pressure, to the Cautio Trust Company, was transformed on 16 December into Wien-Film.

The new company was officially presented with a new mission statement, signed by Joseph Goebbels: "In competition with the other arts, the purpose of film is to give form to what satisfies human hearts and what makes them shudder, and by the revelation of the eternal, transports them into better worlds." The company's expected propaganda function was thus made unmistakably clear. Jews had been forbidden to work in the Austrian film industry since 1935, as the German Reichsfilmkammer had threatened to ban the import of Austrian films unless the industry kept to German terms.

In the drama films produced by the new company Austrian themes dominated, typified by the standard Viennese light romantic comedy, the Wiener Film, lavish in music, costumes and sets, which mostly portrayed past times in rosy hues. From 1943/44, Wien-Film also made colour films, a privilege previously restricted to the UFA company. Wien-Film also produced cultural films.

Besides the production of dramas and cultural films, Wien-Film concentrated on the management of cinemas. Across Austria, the company owned 14 cinemas in Vienna, Berndorf, Linz, Steyr and Steyrermühl. The Vienna cinemas were the "Scala", the "Apollo", the "Busch" and the "UFA-Ton", which were used for premieres. Wien-Film also ran the cinemas formerly owned by KIBA (Wiener Kinobetriebsanstalt) and UFA, under the newly established Ostmärkische Filmtheater Betriebsgesellschaft m.b.H. ("Ostmark Film Theatre Company Ltd").

The film production programme laid down by Berlin was to make films that were rooted in the soil of the Ostmark and provided distraction, in line with the government slogan Kraft durch Freude ("Strength Through Joy").

=== After WWII ===
After the end of World War II, Wien-Film was confiscated by the Allies as "German property". After Vienna had been divided up into five zones of occupation it became apparent that the film studios in Sievering and the main offices in Siebensterngasse came under the American administration, but that the film workshops at Rosenhügel were in the Soviet sector. The Sievering film studios, it was believed, were to be liquidated by the Americans, in the interests of eliminating all possible competition to Hollywood productions.

At the end of 1945, the former head of Vienna film production, Karl Hartl, was nominated the industry's business leader. While the Soviets, according to the provisions of the Potsdam Agreement, took over all former "German" businesses as war reparations, the western occupying powers - Great Britain, the United States and France - waived their rights in this regard. For the newly refounded Wien-Film, this meant that they could continue work at the studios in Sievering and Schönbrunn, but had to write off the studios and workshops at Rosenhügel. These were incorporated into USIA, the Soviet body responsible for administering Austrian assets as war reparations, and operated from then on as "Wien-Film am Rosenhügel".

On 21 August 1945, Wien-Film and the State Department for Reconstruction (Staatsamt für Wiederaufbau) signed a contract for a documentary about the restoration works in Vienna.

After the Austrian State Treaty of 1955, the company passed into state ownership. Since the returns on production and the renting out of the studios were becoming less and less profitable, Wien-Film was wound up as a state company in 1985, leaving only a small holding company to maintain rights over earlier productions.

== Personnel ==
The first directors of Wien-Film were general director Fritz Hirt, Paul Hach and the Viennese film director Karl Hartl, who also remained chief of production right to the end. The making of cultural films was under the direction of Dr. Josef Lebzelter of the former Selenophon-Film company. Overall control of film productions – from the initial idea to the screening - was the responsibility of the Reichsfilmdramaturg and later the Reichsfilmintendant.

The first board meeting took place on 16 December 1938, at which the advisers were also appointed. These were:

- Friedrich Merten, Chief Executive of Film-Finanz, Berlin
- Dr. Josef Joham, board member of the Creditanstalt, Vienna
- Willi Forst, film director, Vienna
- Carl Froelich, film director and president of the Reichsfilmkammer, Berlin
- Dr. Karl Ott, Ministerialdirektor, Berlin
- Hermann Burmeister, Ministerialrat, Berlin
- Heinrich Post, bank director, Berlin

The stars of Wien-Film until 1945 were Wolf Albach-Retty, Elfriede Datzig, Marte Harell, Hans Holt, Olly Holzmann, Attila Hörbiger, Paul Hörbiger, Winnie Markus, Hans Moser, Rudolf Prack, Jane Tilden and Paula Wessely.

The directors most used by Wien-Film were Gustav Ucicky, experienced in getting across National Socialist propaganda content, and E. W. Emo, who between them produced a third of Wien-Film's 60 or so drama films. Not far behind them in productivity were Willi Forst, who was responsible for the best productions of this period, Géza von Bolváry and Hans Thimig, followed by the brothers Ernst and Hubert Marischka, as well as Géza von Cziffra, who with The White Dream (1943) achieved the most commercially successful of Wien-Film's productions.

The most frequently used cameramen were Günther Anders, Georg Bruckbauer, Hans Schneeberger and Jaroslaw Tuzar. Wien-Film's principal composers were Anton Profes and Willy Schmidt-Gentner. Erich von Neusser and Fritz Podehl were producers.

== Studios ==
For premises the only two large studio complexes in Austria - the former Sascha-Film studios in Sievering and the former Vita-Film workshops at Rosenhügel - were acquired. In addition to these, there was also the small workshop formerly belonging to Wiener Kunstfilm in the Bauernmarkt in the Innere Stadt and another small studio in Schönbrunn.

In the three years between 1939 and 1941 next to the Rosenhügel Studios a synchronisation complex was built, with a large and a small synchronisation hall, cutting rooms and offices.

== Film productions ==
Between 1939 and 1945, fifty films were made. There were also a number of delegated productions, which were carried out under the names of Forst-Film, Emo-Film, and Styria-Film.

- Immortal Waltz (1939, E. W. Emo)
- A Mother's Love (1939, Gustav Ucicky)
- Woman in the River (1939, Gerhard Lamprecht)
- Donauschiffer (1939/40, Robert A. Stemmle)
- Der Postmeister (1939/40, Gustav Ucicky)
- Das jüngste Gericht (1939, Franz Seitz senior)
- So gefällst Du mir (1940/41, Hans Thimig, Rudolf Schaad)
- Operetta (1940, Willi Forst)
- My Daughter Lives in Vienna (1940, E. W. Emo)
- Love Is Duty Free (1940/41, E. W. Emo)
- Krambambuli. Die Geschichte eines Hundes (1940, Karl Köstlin)
- Ein Leben lang (1940, Gustav Ucicky)
- Beloved Augustin (1940, E. W. Emo)
- Wir bitten zum Tanz (1941, Hubert Marischka)
- Vienna 1910 (1941/42, E. W. Emo)
- Destiny (1941/42, Géza von Bolváry)
- Heimkehr (1941, Gustav Ucicky)
- Thrice Wed (1941, Geza von Bolvary)
- Brüderlein fein (1941/42, Hans Thimig)
- Two Happy People (1942, E. W. Emo)
- Whom the Gods Love (1942, Karl Hartl)
- Späte Liebe (1942/43, Gustav Ucicky)
- Sommerliebe (1942, Erich Engel)
- Die heimliche Gräfin (1942, Geza von Bolvary)
- Das Ferienkind (1942/43, Karl Hans Leiter)
- Agram, die Hauptstadt Kroatiens (1943, Oktavijan Miletić)
- Black on White (1943, E. W. Emo)
- Schrammeln (1943/44, Geza von Bolvary)
- Romantische Brautfahrt (1943, Leopold Hainisch)
- Reisebekanntschaft (1943, E. W. Emo)
- Glück bei Frauen (1943/44, Peter Paul Brauer)
- Freunde (1943/44, E. W. Emo)
- Die kluge Marianne (1943, Hans Thimig)
- The White Dream (1943, Géza von Cziffra)
- Am Ende der Welt (1943/44, Gustav Ucicky)
- Viennese Girls (1944/45, released 1949, Willi Forst)
- Wie ein Dieb in der Nacht (1944/45, Hans Thimig)
- Umwege zu Dir (1944/45, Hans Thimig)
- Ulli and Marei (1944/45, released 1948, Leopold Hainisch)
- Liebe nach Noten (1944/45, Géza von Cziffra)
- Ein Mann gehört ins Haus (1944/45, Hubert Marischka)
- Die goldene Fessel (1944, Hans Thimig)
- Der gebieterische Ruf (1944, Gustav Ucicky)
- Das Herz muß schweigen (1944, Gustav Ucicky)
- Season in Salzburg (1952, Ernst Marischka)
- 1. April 2000 (1952, Wolfgang Liebeneiner)

== See also ==
- Cinema of Austria
