= The Eternal Tone =

1943 film

- Directed by: Günther Rittau
- Written by: Artur A. Kuhnert; Günther Rittau
- Produced by: Ernst Günter Techow
- Starring: Elfriede Datzig; Rudolf Prack; Olga Chekhova
- Cinematography: Willi Kuhle
- Edited by: Alice Ludwig
- Music by: Franz Grothe
- Production company: Terra Film
- Distributed by: Deutsche Filmvertriebs
- Release date: 15 July 1943
- Running time: 87 minutes
- Country: Germany
- Language: German

The Eternal Tone (German: Der ewige Klang) is a 1943 German drama film directed by Günther Rittau and starring Elfriede Datzig, Rudolf Prack and Olga Chekhova.

It was shot at the Babelsberg and Tempelhof Studios in Berlin and on location in Kitzbühel in Tyrol. The film's sets were designed by the art director Artur Günther.

== Cast ==
- Elfriede Datzig as Therese
- Rudolf Prack as Berthold Buchner
- Olga Chekhova as Josephine Malti, Singer
- Wilhelm Borchert as Matthias Buchner
- O.E. Hasse as Impresario Grundmann
- Georges Boulanger as Mit sein Ensemble
- Hans Dengel as Holzfäller
- Georg Vogelsang as Florian
- Olga Engl as Zuhörerin
- Leopold Esterle as Holzfäller
- Karl Etlinger as Ladeninhaber
- Liselotte Schaak as Zuhörerin
- Eva Krause as Zofe Nanette
- Eva Klein-Donath as Zuhörerin
- Jack Trevor as American
- Georg H. Schnell as American
- Carl Söllner
- Eduard Gautsch as Mitglied der Geigenbauerzunft
- Helmi Mareich as Junges Mädchen
- Karl Harbacher
- Hans Kratzer as Wirt
- Ludwig Schmid-Wildy as Mitglied der Geigenbauerzunft
- Karl Körner as Preisrichter
- Hadrian Maria Netto as Alte Exzellence
- Karl Platen as Diener
- Ekkehard Röhrer as Geselle
- Rudolf Schündler as Schneidermeister
- Richard Ludwig as American
- Kate Kühl as Zuhörerin
- Kurt Henneberg as Geige für R.Prack

== Bibliography ==
- Bock, Hans-Michael & Bergfelder, Tim. The Concise CineGraph. Encyclopedia of German Cinema. Berghahn Books, 2009.
- Hake, Sabine. German National Cinema. Routledge, 2002.
