= Flowers from Nice =

1936 film directed by Augusto Genina

- Directed by: Augusto Genina
- Written by: Franz Bronow; Max Wallner
- Produced by: Franz Hoffermann
- Starring: Erna Sack; Friedl Czepa; Karl Schönböck; Paul Kemp
- Cinematography: Franz Planer; Hans Heinz Theyer; Walter Tuch
- Edited by: Wolfgang Wehrum
- Music by: Dénes von Buday
- Production company: Gloria Film
- Distributed by: Kiba Kinobetriebsanstalt
- Release date: 24 September 1936
- Running time: 111 minutes
- Country: Austria
- Language: German

Flowers from Nice (German: Blumen aus Nizza) is a 1936 Austrian musical comedy film directed by Augusto Genina and starring Erna Sack, Friedl Czepa and Karl Schönböck. It was shot at the Rosenhügel Studios in Vienna and on location around Nice on the French Riviera. The film's sets were designed by art directors Emil Stepanek and Julius von Borsody. The film premiered in Vienna in September 1936. In 1939 it was screened in the United States.

The film is currently held at the Library of Congress.

== Cast ==
- Erna Sack as Maria Castoldi
- Friedl Czepa as Lisette
- Karl Schönböck as Graf Ulrich von Traunstein
- Paul Kemp as Rudi Hofer
- Jane Tilden as Christl Niedermeyer
- Hans Homma as Francois
- Johanna Terwin as Frau Keller
- Alfred Neugebauer as Chapelet
- Anda Bori as Florence

== Bibliography ==
- Waldman, Harry. Nazi Films In America, 1933-1942. McFarland & Company, 2008.
