= Elfriede Datzig =

Austrian actress

- Born: 26 July 1922; Vienna, Austria
- Died: 27 January 1946 (aged 23); Ramsau bei Berchtesgaden, Bavaria, Germany
- Occupation: Actress
- Years active: 1938–1945 (film)

Elfriede Datzig (26 July 1922 – 27 January 1946) was an Austrian film actress. Following the Anschluss, Datzig appeared in a number of films made by Wien-Film such as the 1939 comedy Anton the Last. She married the actor Albert Hehn. After the war, she formed a band (Hit Kid Swingsters) and sang with Mady Rahl for the USO. In 1946, she died at the age of 23 due to an allergic reaction to penicillin.

== Selected filmography ==
- Finale (1938)
- Anton the Last (1939)
- Hotel Sacher (1939)
- Fräulein Figaro (short, 1939)
- Roses in Tyrol (1940)
- My Daughter Lives in Vienna (1940)
- The Waitress Anna (1941)
- The Secret Countess (1942)
- The War of the Oxen (1943)
- Black on White (1943)
- The Eternal Tone (1943)
- Trip Acquaintance (1943)
- The White Dream (1943, unfinished)
- Seven Letters (1944)
- The False Bride (1945)

== Bibliography ==
- Dassanowsky, Robert. Austrian Cinema: A History. McFarland & Company, 2005.
- Polt, Rudolf. The Films of Elfriede Datzig. 2011.
- Polt, Rudolf. The Diary of Elfriede Datzig. 2011.
