= Confetti (1936 film) =

1936 film

- Directed by: Hubert Marischka
- Written by: Ernst Marischka
- Produced by: Ernst Mosich
- Starring: Hans Holt; Leo Slezak; Friedl Czepa; Hans Moser
- Cinematography: Oskar Schnirch
- Edited by: Roger von Norman
- Music by: Robert Stolz
- Production company: Gloria Film
- Distributed by: Huschak Film; Rota Film (Germany)
- Release date: 4 September 1936
- Running time: 87 minutes
- Country: Austria
- Language: German

Confetti (German: Konfetti) is a 1936 Austrian comedy film directed by Hubert Marischka and starring Hans Holt, Leo Slezak, Friedl Czepa and Hans Moser. It was shot at the Sievering Studios and Rosenhügel Studios in Vienna. The film's sets were designed by the art director Julius von Borsody.

== Cast ==
- Hans Holt as Helmut von Sörensen
- Leo Slezak as August Sommerbauer
- Friedl Czepa as Hanni Gruber, Verkäuferin
- Hans Moser as Heinrich Kümmelmann
- Richard Romanowsky as Prof. Vinzenz Kornmeier
- Gisa Wilke as Ida, Wilhelm's Frau
- Reinhold Häussermann as Wilhelm, Diener bei Sörensen
- Jane Tilden as Franzi, Verkäuferin
- Hans Loibner as Franz, Kellner
- Alfred Neugebauer as Verlagsdirektor
- Ferdinand Mayerhofer as Polizeibeamter
- Hanns Obonya as Ein Pikkolo
- Auguste Pünkösdy as Marie, Köchin bei Kornmeier
- Richard Waldemar as Schimmerlin, Freund Sommerbauers
- Hanni Elsner as Korpulente Frau
- Lotte Spira as Frau Sommerbauer

== Bibliography ==
- Klaus, Ulrich J. Deutsche Tonfilme: Jahrgang 1936. Klaus-Archiv, 1988.
- Von Dassanowsky, Robert. Screening Transcendence: Film Under Austrofascism and the Hollywood Hope, 1933-1938. Indiana University Press, 2018
