= Joseph Bayer =

American politician

Joseph Bayer (1846–1900) was an importer and wholesaler of wines and liquors, in 19th century Los Angeles, California. He emigrated to the U.S. from the Kingdom of Württemberg.

== Personal ==
Bayer was born November 1, 1846, in Württemberg, Germany, and came to the United States as a boy. In 1870 he journeyed to California and settled in Los Angeles, and he became a naturalized citizen that year. He married Katherine Barbara Happ of Buffalo, New York, and they had a son, Alfred Joseph

He died July 26, 1900, in his home at 746 South Broadway, the cause being given as diabetes. In 1906, his widow married William W. Hoagland.

== Vocation ==
Bayer enlisted in the Union Army at the outbreak of the American Civil War and served three years. In 1872 he set up a wholesale liquor and winery enterprise, with an importing business at Requina and Main Streets, Los Angeles, and remained there eighteen years, except for two years that he spent in Phoenix, Arizona. Bayer, who was seen also as a "well-known caterer and saloonist," was associated in various businesses with C.F.A. Last and also with a man named Sattler. Bayer's establishment, known as Joe Bayer's, was the meeting place of "a sort of Deutscher Klüb," recalled local writer Harris Newmark in his history of that period.

Bayer was the owner of a park at the junction of West First and West Second Streets, where in that vicinity oil was first discovered in Los Angeles, in 1892. Afterward, he drew a "handsome steady income" from the royalties.

=== Public service ===
Bayer was a one-term member of the Los Angeles Common Council, the legislative branch of the city.

== References and notes ==
- Access to the Los Angeles Times links may require the use of a library card.
