= Traudl Stark =

Austrian actress (1930–2021)

Gertraud Marianne South (née Münzel, 17 March 1930 – 14 October 2021), better known as Traudl Stark, was an Austrian child actor in German cinema.

Stark was born in Vienna on 17 March 1930, to secretary Siegfried Stark and Margarete Münzel. Her parents married later. She started her career in German cinema in 1934, and became known as "The Shirley Temple of Austria". During World War II, she appeared in a number of Nazi propaganda films. Between 1945 and 1947 she also acted on stage in Vienna. In 1948 she married Jack Elliot from Alabama and went to live with him in the United States, where they had two children together.

She later married her second husband, Thomas South. From 1973, she lived in Tampa, Florida, where she died on 14 October 2021, at the age of 91.

== Filmography ==
- Asew (1935)
- Manja Valewska or Maria Walewska (1936)
- His Daughter is Called Peter (1936)
- Darling of the Sailors (1937)
- Peter im Schnee, English title: Peter in the Snow (1937)
- Prinzessin Sissy or Prinzessin Wildfang, English title: Princess Sissy (1938)
- Mutterliebe, English title: A Mother's Love (1939)
- The Fox of Glenarvon (1940)
- Leidenschaft, English title: "Passion" (1940)
