= Otto Treßler =

German actor (1871–1965)

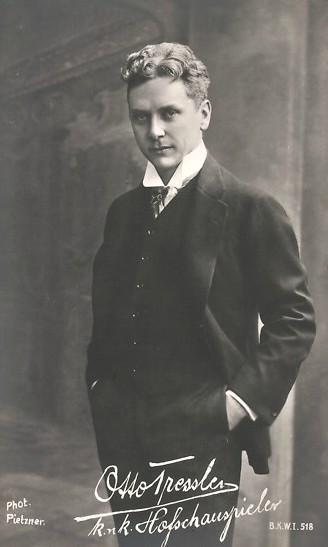
- Born: Otto Karl August Meyer; 13 April 1871; Stuttgart, German Empire
- Died: 27 April 1965 (aged 94); Vienna, Austria
- Occupation: Actor
- Years active: 1915–1962

Otto Treßler, also Otto Tressler, (13 April 1871 – 27 April 1965) was a German-Austrian stage and film actor. He appeared in more than 40 films between 1915 and 1962. He was born in Stuttgart, Germany and died in Vienna, Austria. He was a close friend to Archduchess Maria Josepha of Austria.

== Partial filmography ==
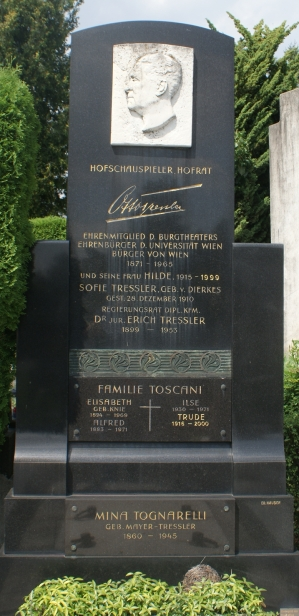
Treßler's grave at the Döbling Cemetery in Vienna.

- Das Geheimnis des Goldpokals (1918)
- The Story of a Maid (1921) - Leopold
- Frau Dorothys Bekenntnis (1921)
- Das Weib des Irren (1921) - Graf
- Children of Darkness (1921, part 1, 2) - Schiffskapitän Pool
- Die Narrenkappe der Liebe (1921) - Spieler
- Pflicht und Ehre (1924)
- Le fauteuil 47 (1926) - Le baron Lebret
- The Crimson Circle (1929) - Ministerpräsident
- Storm in a Water Glass (1931) - Gerichtsvorsitzender
- Gently My Songs Entreat (1933) - Graf Esterhaazy
- The Rakoczi March (1933) - Der Regimentsarzt
- When You're Young, the World Belongs to You (1934) - Rossani
- The Island (1934) - Der Botschafter
- Abenteuer eines jungen Herrn in Polen (1934) - Graf Lubenski
- Episode (1935) - Otto Torresani
- Die Pompadour (1935) - Cicerone
- The Court Concert (1936) - Lord Melbourne
- Victoria in Dover (1936) - Landesfürst Serenissimus
- Dangerous Game (1937) - Rosys Großvater Gustav Adolf Martini
- Maria Papoila (1937) - Dr. Kristof
- Prinzessin Sissy (1939) - King Ludwig I. of Bavaria
- Castles in the Air (1939) - Forster
- I Am Sebastian Ott (1939) - Oberst Holzapfel
- Linen from Ireland (1939) - Präsident Kettner
- Comrades (1941) - Gesandter von Krusemarck
- Two Happy People (1943)
- Vienna 1910 (1943) - Graf Paar
- Romantische Brautfahrt (1944) - Josef Graf Mannsberg
- Die Zaubergeige (1944) - Landgraf von Homburg
- The Black Robe (1944) - Baron Friedberg
- Opfergang (1944) - Senator Froben
- Arlberg Express (1948) - Tschurtschentaler
- On Resonant Shores (1948) - Abt
- Stadtpark (1951)
- Maria Theresa (1951) - Graf Aliano
- 1. April 2000 (1952) - Engl. Hochkommissar
- Franz Schubert (1953)
- Victoria in Dover (1954) - Archbishop of Canterbury
- Sissi (1955) - Feldmarschall Radetzky
- Sissi – The Young Empress (1956) - Feldmarschall Radetzky
- Vienna, City of My Dreams (1957) - Fürst Vitus
- Forever My Love (1962) - (uncredited)

== Decorations and awards ==
- 1902: court actor
- 1931: Honorary citizen of the City of Vienna
- 1935: Councillor
- 1937: Austrian Cross of Merit for Art and Science, First Class
- 1937: Honorary Ring of the Vienna
- 1938: State actor (in German: Staatsschauspieler)
- 1941: Goethe Medal for Art and Science
- 1942: Gold Civil Service Faithful Service Medal
- 1951: Honorary Ring of the City of Vienna (Renewed presentation for war loss)
- 1956: Grand Decoration of Honour for Services to the Republic of Austria
- 1961: Great Cross of Merit of the Federal Republic of Germany
- 1961: Freeman of the University of Vienna
- 1963: Austrian Cross of Honour for Science and Art, 1st class
