= Woman in the River =

- Directed by: Gerhard Lamprecht
- Written by: Gerhard Menzel
- Produced by: Karl Hartl; Erich von Neusser
- Starring: Hertha Feiler; Attila Hörbiger; Oskar Sima; Fritz Rasp
- Cinematography: Karl Hasselmann
- Edited by: Axel von Werner
- Music by: Giuseppe Becce
- Production company: Wien-Film
- Distributed by: Terra Film
- Release date: 13 October 1939
- Running time: 94 minutes
- Country: Germany
- Language: German

Woman in the River (German: Frau im Strom) is a 1939 drama film directed by Gerhard Lamprecht and starring Hertha Feiler, Attila Hörbiger and Oskar Sima. The film was made by Wien-Film, a Vienna-based company set up after Austria had been incorporated into Greater Germany following the 1938 Anschluss.

== Cast ==
- Hertha Feiler as Hannerl
- Attila Hörbiger as Alois Händerl
- Oskar Sima as Schani
- Fritz Rasp as Wendelin
- Alexander Trojan as Franz Schatter
- Herbert Gernot as Brunner
- Werner Scharf as Keryllis
- Olly Holzmann as Hedi
- Rudolf Carl as Polizeibeamter
- Kurt Filipp as Ein Junge
- Karl Forest as Angler
- Willi Hufnagel as 2. Wachmann
- Hans Kammauf as 3. Wachmann
- Oskar Wegrostek as 1. Wachmann
- Lisl Kinast as Liebende
- Alfred Lehner as Liebender
- Eduard Spieß as Bäugerl
- Ferry Wondra as Strassenbahnschafner
