= Fritz Imhoff =

Austrian actor

External audio
- Shellac Recordings with Fritz Imhoff in the Online Archive of the Österreichische Mediathek

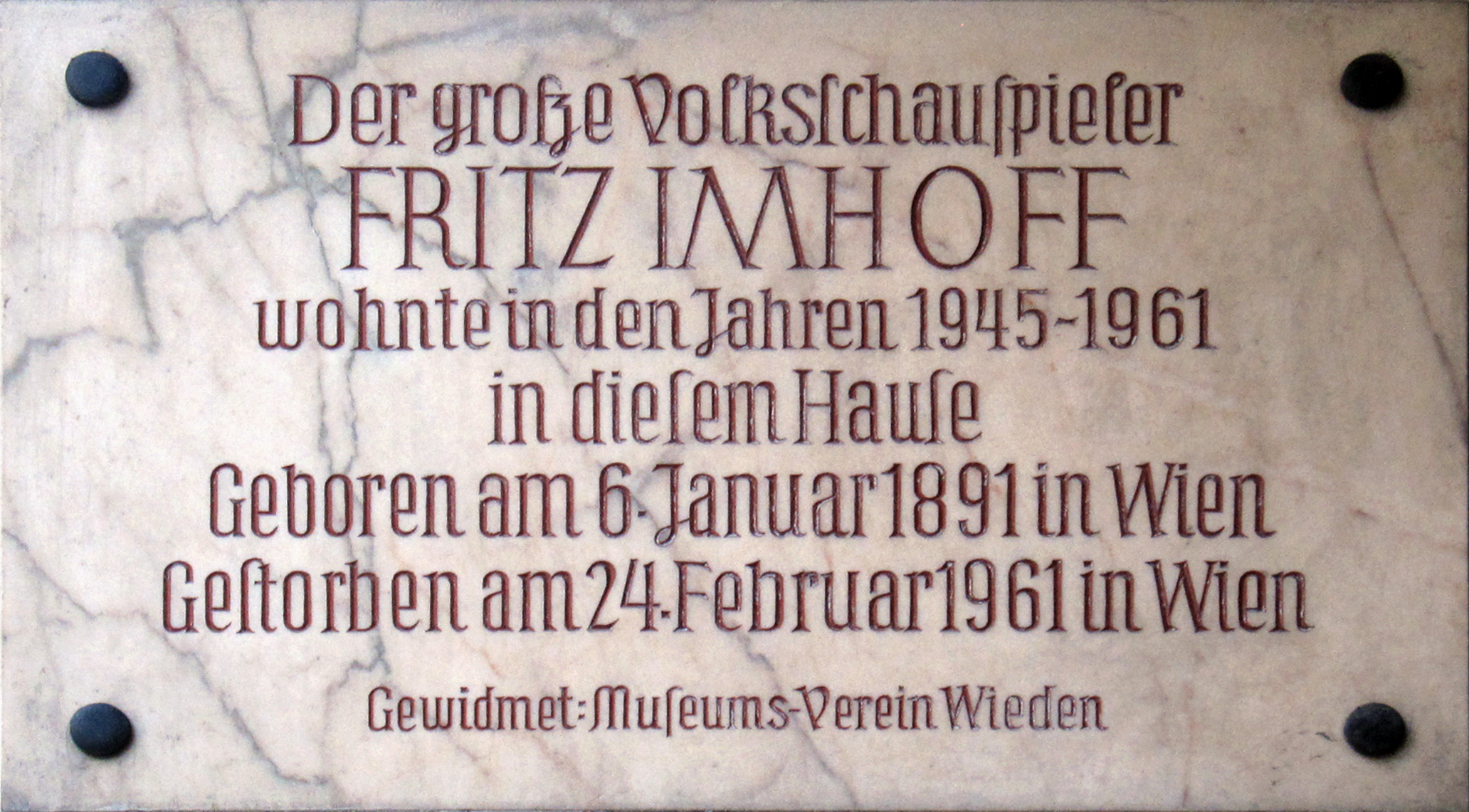
A commemorative plaque at the Habig-Hof, Wiedner Hauptstraße 23, Wieden

Fritz Imhoff, real name: Friedrich Arnold Heinrich Jeschke (January 6, 1891, Alsergrund – February 24, 1961, Wieden) was an Austrian actor, operetta singer (tenor) and comedian.

== Biography ==
He grew up in Vienna where he also got his first vocal training. In 1911, still under the name Fritz Jeschke, he had his first engagement as an operetta tenor at the City Theatre in Opava, but was not very successful. In 1913/1914 he was engaged at the Stadttheater Baden near Vienna; from this point on he used the stage name Imhoff. Later he performed at almost all the important theatres in Vienna. At the same time, he started his career as a comedian at the cabaret Die Hölle

Form 1933 onwards Imhoff appeared in 173 films. The portly character comedian portrayed a wide range of characters, from grumpy to easygoing, and frequently performed songs.

From 1938 to 1944, Fritz Imhoff worked at the Raimund Theater in Vienna, serving as its director from 1945 to 1948. At the Scala Vienna, he performed in the anti-fascist folk play Der Bockerer whose later film adaptation (Der Bockerer) is also known in English.

Fritz Imhoff was married to the actress Huberta Mojzis (1909–2002) from 1931 until his death. The marriage remained childless. His brother was the Wienerlied composer Ernst Arnold (1890–1962).

== Selected filmography ==
- Daughter of the Regiment (1933)
- Leap into Bliss (1934)
- Spring Parade (1934)
- Nocturne (1934)
- Episode (1935)
- Everything for the Company (1935)
- Suburban Cabaret (1935)
- Eva (1935)
- I Love All the Women (1935)
- The Cossack and the Nightingale (1935)
- Silhouettes (1936)
- Rendezvous in Vienna (1936)
- The Emperor's Candlesticks (1936)
- Where the Lark Sings (1936)
- The Postman from Longjumeau (1936)
- Catherine the Last (1936)
- Romance (1936)
- Thank You, Madame (1936)
- The Fairy Doll (1936)
- Lumpaci the Vagabond (1936)
- Rendezvous in Wien (1936)
- Millionäre (1937)
- The Charm of La Boheme (1937)
- Roxy and the Wonderteam (1938)
- Little County Court (1938)
- Linen from Ireland (1939)
- Immortal Waltz (1939)
- Hotel Sacher (1939)
- A Mother's Love (1939)
- Vienna Tales (1940)
- Love is Duty Free (1941)
- Thrice Wed (1941)
- The Secret Countess (1942)
- Whom the Gods Love (1942)
- Vienna Blood (1942)
- Two Happy People (1943)
- The White Dream (1943)
- Schrammeln (1944)
- Viennese Girls (1945)
- The Freckle (1948)
- The Mozart Story (1948)
- The Heavenly Waltz (1948)
- Cordula (1950)
- The Fourth Commandment (1950)
- Call Over the Air (1951)
- The Dubarry (1951)
- Dance Into Happiness (1951)
- Knall and Fall as Imposters (1952)
- Season in Salzburg (1952)
- 1. April 2000 (1952)
- That Can Happen to Anyone (1952)
- Hannerl (1952)
- To Be Without Worries (1953)
- Grandstand for General Staff (1953)
- Lavender (1953)
- Franz Schubert (1953)
- The Spendthrift (1953)
- Arena of Death (1953)
- The Big Star Parade (1954)
- The Three from the Filling Station (1955)
- Royal Hunt in Ischl (1955)
- And Who Is Kissing Me? (1956)
- My Aunt, Your Aunt (1956)
- Love, Girls and Soldiers (1958)
- The Good Soldier Schweik (1960)
- Guitars Sound Softly Through the Night (1960)
