= Friedl Czepa =

Austrian actress

- Born: 3 September 1898; Amstetten, Lower Austria; Austro-Hungarian Empire
- Died: 22 June 1973 (aged 74); Vienna, Austria
- Other name: Friederike Pfaffeneder
- Occupation: Actress
- Years active: 1935–1969 (film)

Friedl Czepa (1898–1973) was an Austrian stage, film and television actress. Czepa made her film debut in 1935, and went on to appear in roughly thirty cinema and television films during her career. Along with Oskar Sima, Fred Hennings and Leni Riefenstahl she was identified as being an active supporter of the Nazi Party. She was the director of the Vienna Stadttheater from 1940 to 1945. Because of her Nazi links, she received a professional ban following the Second World War but slowly rebuilt her career.

She was married three her times; her husbands included Hans Schott-Schöbinger and Rolf Wanka.

== Selected filmographys ==
- Episode (1935)
- Everything for the Company (1935)
- The Emperor's Candlesticks (1936)
- Flowers from Nice (1936)
- Thank You, Madame (1936)
- Confetti (1936)
- Die Fledermaus (1937)
- Millionäre (1937)
- Immortal Waltz (1939)
- Anuschka (1942)
- Vienna Waltzes (1951)
- Knall and Fall as Imposters (1952)
- Irene in Trouble (1953)
- Her Corporal (1956)
- The Priest and the Girl (1958)
- Die unvollkommene Ehe (1959)
- Kein Mann zum Heiraten (1959)
- Guitars Sound Softly Through the Night (1960)

== Bibliography ==
- Dassanowsky, Robert. Austrian Cinema: A History. McFarland & Company, 2005.
