= Erna Sack =

German opera singer

- Erna Sack, 1956
- Born: Erna Dorothea Luise Weber; 6 February 1898; Spandau, Berlin, German Empire
- Died: 2 March 1972 (aged 74); Mainz, West Germany
- Burial place: South Cemetery Wiesbaden
- Other name: The German Nightingale (German: Die deutsche Nachtigall)
- Citizenship: German; Brazilian
- Occupations: Operatic soprano; actress
- Years active: 1928–1957
- Spouse: Hermann Sack (m. 1921)

Erna Dorothea Luise Sack (née Weber; 6 February 1898 – 2 March 1972) was a German lyric coloratura soprano, known as the German Nightingale for her high vocal range.

== Biography ==
Erna Weber was born in Spandau, Berlin. As a child, her voice attracted attention both at school and in the church choir in which she sang. In 1921, she married Hermann Sack, of Jewish descent. She studied at the Prague Conservatory, and later privately in Berlin with Oscar Daniel.

Her career accelerated in 1930 when her uncanny ability to sing stratospheric high notes, including "C above high C" (C_{7}), was discovered. Richard Strauss wrote a new cadenza for her high voice, for her to sing as Zerbinetta in Ariadne auf Naxos.

In 1931, she sang Norina in Donizetti's Don Pasquale at Bielefeld Opera, where her voice made a great impression and her gifts were immediately recognised. The Theater Wiesbaden engaged her in 1932, and in that year she also made several radio broadcasts and recordings. In 1934 she was engaged by the Breslau Opera, where her roles included her first Zerbinetta in Ariadne auf Naxos, and the following year arrived at the Semperoper in Dresden, where she attracted the attention of Karl Böhm and, above all, Strauss. In 1934 she also made a spectacular return to Berlin, appearing as Gilda in Verdi's Rigoletto alongside Heinrich Schlusnus as the Jester and Walther Ludwig as the Duke under the baton of Erich Kleiber.

In 1935, Erna Sack made her first series of concert tours, to Austria, the Netherlands, France, and the United Kingdom. During the same year, she signed an exclusive recording contract with Telefunken. She appeared in the world premiere of Strauss's Die schweigsame Frau as Isotta, a role in which her special commitment earned her the gratitude of both Strauss and Karl Böhm. As a result, she was invited to sing the part of Zerbinetta under Strauss's personal direction when the Dresden State Opera visited the Covent Garden Royal Opera House in 1936.

From this point onwards Sack's career took off. She seemed to work tirelessly, at the opera, in concert tours, and touring, including to Rome where she appeared in Mozart's The Magic Flute with a cast that included Tito Schipa and Licia Albanese, Copenhagen, Oslo, and, for the first time, the United States, where she shared a platform at Carnegie Hall with Joseph Schmidt and Richard Tauber (24 October 1937) singing a duet from Lehár's The Merry Widow. She had some difficulty, however, when asked to sing at the Lyric Opera of Chicago, being asked to sing the roles of Rosina and Donizetti's Lucia in the Italian language, because she argued that she had not had sufficient time to re-learn those roles in their original language (throughout Europe at that time operas were largely sung in the tongue of the nation in which they were being performed). During the war, her Jewish husband was imprisoned in a concentration camp.

After World War II, Sack toured extensively and was particularly successful in Latin America, especially Argentina, Uruguay, Chile, and Brazil (with the result that she and her husband took Brazilian citizenship). However, it was in Canada that she enjoyed her greatest post-war successes and for a number of years the couple lived in Montreal. She later toured South Africa and South-West Africa, and she returned to West Germany in 1950.

In 1953, she carried out an extended tour of the Federal Republic of Germany and West Berlin, a marathon undertaking involving over 40 concerts that was followed that autumn by a major tour of Australia and New Zealand. In the autumn of 1954 she celebrated her return to the United States which included a triumphant appearance at Carnegie Hall. She ended her concert career with one final tour of West Germany in the autumn of 1954, a concert at Constitution Hall, Washington, D.C. in 1956 and a brief tour of East Germany in 1957, and then withdrew from public life.

Sack also appeared in numerous films produced in Germany such as Flowers from Nice (1936) and Nanon, the latter being one of the most famous operettas produced in this period. Throughout her career Sack recorded profusely, first on acetate, then, starting about 1935, on the new German invention – the AEG Magnetophon. Recording on tape proved to be infinitely superior to disc and very considerable quantities of those recordings were later transferred to long-playing records (LPs).

She died in a Mainz clinic on 2 March 1972 following an operation for cancer. She was buried in South Cemetery Wiesbaden.

== Selected filmography ==
- Flowers from Nice (1936)
- Nanon (1938)
