= Thank You, Madame =

1936 film directed by Carmine Gallone

- Directed by: Carmine Gallone
- Written by: Philipp Lothar Mayring
- Starring: Jan Kiepura; Friedl Czepa; Luli Deste; Theo Lingen
- Cinematography: Franz Planer
- Edited by: Oswald Hafenrichter
- Music by: Dénes Buday; Willy Schmidt-Gentner
- Production companies: Gloria-Film; Horus-Film
- Distributed by: Tobis-Sascha Film
- Release date: 17 June 1936
- Running time: 93 minutes
- Country: Austria
- Language: German

Thank You, Madame (German: Opernring) is a 1936 Austrian musical film directed by Carmine Gallone and starring Jan Kiepura, Friedl Czepa and Luli Deste. It is also known by the alternative title In the Sunshine (Im Sonnenschein). The film's sets were designed by Julius von Borsody.

== Cast ==
- Jan Kiepura as Toni Kowalski
- Friedl Czepa as Mizzi, flower girl
- Luli Deste as Corinne Dalma
- Theo Lingen as Der Diener
- Fritz Imhoff as Heini Weidl
- Anton Pointner as Frank Dalma
- Anton Neugenbauer as Der Operndirektor
- Robert Valberg as Lawyer
- Babette Devrient as Großmamma Sophie
- Maria Mell as Großmamma Emma

== Accolades ==
Award	Date of ceremony	Category	Recipient(s)	Result	Ref.
Venice Film Festival	31 August 1936	Special recommendation	Thank You, Madame	Won	

== Works cited ==
- Waldman, Harry (2008). Nazi Films In America, 1933-1942. McFarland & Company. ISBN 9780786438617.

== Bibliography ==
- Hake, Sabine. Popular Cinema of the Third Reich. University of Texas Press, 2001.
