= Gisa Wurm =

Austrian actress

- Born: 8 October 1885; Winzendorf-Muthmannsdorf, Austro-Hungarian Empire
- Died: 10 August 1957 (aged 71); Vienna, Austria
- Occupation: Actress
- Years active: 1929–1953 (film)

Gisa Wurm (8 October 1885 – 10 August 1957) was an Austrian stage and film actress.

== Selected filmography ==
- Grand Duchess Alexandra (1933)
- Harvest (1936)
- Mirror of Life (1938)
- My Daughter Lives in Vienna (1940)
- Judgement Day (1940)
- Operetta (1940)
- Love Is Duty Free (1941)
- Violanta (1942)
- Two Happy People (1943)
- Gateway to Peace (1951)
- Franz Schubert (1953)
- Lavender (1953)

== Bibliography ==
- Giesen, Rolf. Nazi Propaganda Films: A History and Filmography. McFarland, 2003.
