= The Optimist (film) =

1938 film

- Directed by: E.W. Emo
- Written by: Felix von Eckardt
- Based on: Ölrausch by Jack Larric
- Produced by: E.W. Emo
- Starring: Viktor de Kowa; Henny Porten; Gusti Huber; Theo Lingen
- Cinematography: Eduard Hoesch
- Edited by: Munni Obal
- Music by: Nico Dostal
- Production company: Emo Film
- Distributed by: Siegel Monopolfilm
- Release date: 21 October 1938
- Running time: 84 minutes
- Country: Germany
- Language: German

The Optimist (German: Der Optimist) is a 1938 German comedy film directed by E.W. Emo and starring Viktor de Kowa, Henny Porten, Gusti Huber and Theo Lingen. It was shot at the Sievering Studios in Vienna. The film's sets were designed by the art director Julius von Borsody. By the time of the film's release, Austria was part of Greater Germany following the Anschluss.

== Cast ==
- Viktor de Kowa as Gustl
- Henny Porten
- Gusti Huber
- Theo Lingen
- Else Elster
- Oskar Sima
- Hans Unterkircher
- Rudolf Carl
- Julius Brandt
- Ferdinand Mayerhofer
- Wilhelm Schich

== Bibliography ==
- Klaus, Ulrich J. Deutsche Tonfilme: Jahrgang 1939. Klaus-Archiv, 1988.
- Von Dassanowsky, Robert. Austrian Cinema: A History. McFarland, 2005.
