= Episode (film) =

- Directed by: Walter Reisch
- Written by: Walter Reisch
- Produced by: Walter Reisch, Viktoria-Film
- Starring: Paula Wessely; Karl Ludwig Diehl; Otto Tressler
- Cinematography: Harry Stradling
- Edited by: Willy Zeyn
- Music by: Willy Schmidt-Gentner
- Distributed by: Syndikat-Film
- Release dates: 23 August 1935 (Germany); 13 September 1935 (Austria)
- Running time: 105 min.
- Country: Austria
- Language: German

Episode is an Austrian film from 1935. It belongs to the popular Austrian light romantic comedy genre known as the Wiener Film, but also contains, for a film of this genre, unusually serious social comment. It was written and produced by Walter Reisch. The film has a particular importance in German-language film history as the only Austrian film with a Jewish producer that was permitted to be imported and shown in Nazi Germany after 1933 and the ban on Jews working in the film industry.

The German premiere took place on 23 August 1935 in the Gloria-Palast in Berlin. The Austrian premiere was in a Vienna cinema on 13 September of the same year. It was first broadcast on television by the ARD on 2 December 1958. On 1 April 1994 it was released on VHS video.

== Plot ==
In Vienna in 1922 daily life is dominated by inflation and unemployment. In the evenings, the population attempt to divert themselves from the miseries of the economic situation by indulgence and excess in bars and clubs. Morale is low, and sinking further.

Through the failed speculations of the president of her bank, Valerie Gärtner, a student of applied art in Vienna, loses the small property on which she and her mother live. Torresani, an art dealer, notices her distress and buys some ceramics from her. He also offers her financial support in the form of a monthly allowance. Valerie however, in the belief that he would expect something unacceptable from her in return for this money, rejects the offer with disgust. Nevertheless, when some time later she runs out of options, she once more approaches Torresani for help. He is now able to convince her that he is not looking for something in return, but is genuinely trying to help her, and in due course the two become good friends.

One day, when Torresani is unable to keep an appointment with her, he sends in his place Kinz, the tutor of his sons. Kinz believes that Valerie is Torresani's mistress and his initial demeanour towards her is therefore extremely cold. However, he falls in love with her during the course of the evening. Valerie in the meantime learns from Kinz that Torresani has a wife and two children, and she decides that she can no longer accept the monthly cheques. But a friend of hers, who disagrees with Valerie's decision, intercepts the next cheque and cashes it in Valerie's place. The friend later regrets her deceit and visits Torresani's house to confess and put things right. But when she arrives she is unable to get a word in edgeways and is sent away again with a letter for Valerie. Valerie assumes that it is a letter of farewell from Torresani, and immediately goes to his house, where she is received in an unexpectedly friendly way by his wife. It now appears that the letter was an invitation to a party.

Kinz had convinced Frau Torresani that her husband was having an affair. The misunderstanding is now cleared up, and Kinz himself is now put on the defensive, and at last becomes aware of his own true feelings for Valerie.

== Cast ==
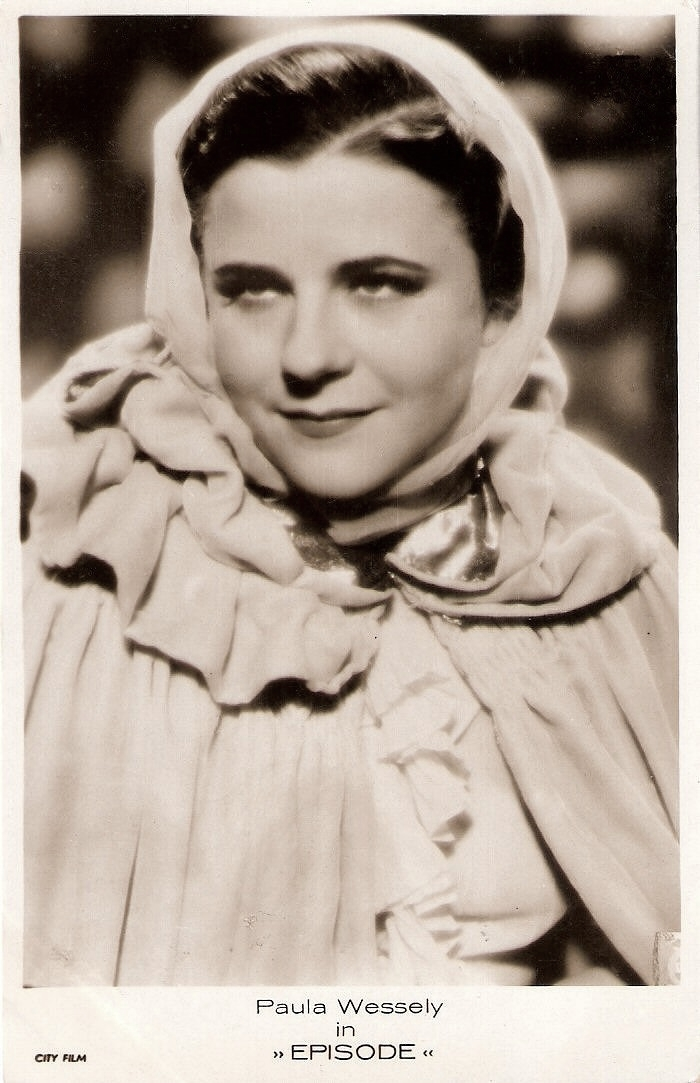
Paula Wessely promotional photo for Episode

- Karl Ludwig Diehl: Kinz, the Torresanis' tutor
- Paula Wessely: Valerie Gärtner
- Otto Tressler: Torresani, an art dealer
- Erika von Wagner: Frau Torresani, his wife
- Hans Jürgen Tressler: Eugen, Torresani's son
- Wolf-Dieter Tressler: Toni, Torresani's son
- Friedl Czepa: Mizzi Maranek
- Walter Janssen: lawyer
- Ferdinand Mayerhofer: professor at the school of applied arts
- Rosa Albach-Retty: Frau Gärtner, Valerie's mother
- Fritz Imhoff: cinema announcer
- Ernst Arnold: street singer
- Lisl Handl: serving girl
- Wilhelm Heim: a suicide
- Dorothy Pool: singer in a bar
- Maria Eis: chamber singer

== Production ==
The film was produced by the Viennese company Viktoria-Film. The sound system used was that of Tobis-Klangfilm. The set builders were Karl Stepanek and Franz Meschkan, and the designer was Oskar Strnad.

Distribution was by Syndikat-Film, and promotion by Tobis-Sascha-Filmindustrie.

== Release ==
=== Background ===
The German Reichsfilmkammer exceptionally gave permission for the film to be shown in Germany. This was the only time after the National Socialists came to power in 1933 that an Austrian film on which Jews had worked received consent to be shown in Germany.

Artistically Episode is distinguished by its setting in the economic crisis of 1922, the oppressive atmosphere of which is elevated, largely by Paula Wessely's performance as the penniless art student, into an emotionally powerful psychological depiction of the double standards of contemporary Vienna.

=== Versions and censor's decisions ===
At the censors' inspection in Germany on 8 August 1935 the film had a length of 2,893 metres. The censors found the film unsuitable for minors, and removed altogether 61 metres, so that the film went on release in Germany with a length of 2,832 metres. In Austria the film was released with a length of 2,930 metres and was declared "artistically notable".

== Critical response ==
Writing for The Spectator in 1935, Graham Greene gave the film a poor review, describing the comedy as "rather silly", and criticizing the "perfunctory, [...] humorous and sentimental" treatment of so tragic a topic as the Viennese depression of 1922. Greene also criticized the "natural" acting of Paula Wessely, stating his preference for the "naturalistic" acting of actors like Lynn Fontanne.

=== Awards ===
- Venice Film Festival 1935:
  - Volpi Cup for Best Actress: Paula Wessely
  - Nomination for Mussolini Cup: Walter Reisch

== Film music ==
The score was composed by Willy Schmidt-Gentner, using foreign compositions from the early 1920s. The title song was composed by Robert Katscher; the director Walter Reisch co-wrote the lyrics. The Viennese music publisher Ludwig Doblinger (Bernhard Herzmansky) published three songs from the film: Ein Dirndl muß klein sein, Es kommt einmal der Augenblick and Jetzt müßte die Welt versinken.

== Sources ==
- Deutsche Tonfilme – Band 06 – 1935. Ulrich J. Klaus Verlag, Berlin 1995 ISBN 3-927352-05-5
