= Immortal Waltz =

1939 film

- German film poster
- German: Unsterblicher Walzer
- Directed by: E. W. Emo
- Written by: Karl Köstlin; Friedrich Schreyvogel
- Produced by: E. W. Emo
- Starring: Paul Hörbiger; Dagny Servaes; Maria Andergast; Friedl Czepa
- Cinematography: Hans Schneeberger
- Music by: Alois Melichar
- Production companies: Wien-Film; Tobis Film
- Distributed by: Tobis Film
- Release date: 24 August 1939
- Running time: 96 minutes
- Country: Germany
- Language: German

Immortal Waltz (German: Unsterblicher Walzer) is a 1939 historical drama film directed by E. W. Emo and starring Paul Hörbiger, Dagny Servaes, and Maria Andergast.

It was shot at the Rosenhügel Studios in Vienna. The film's art direction was by Julius von Borsody. The film portrays the lives of the Austrian composer Johann Strauss I and his family. The film was made by Wien-Film, a Vienna-based company set up after Austria had been incorporated into Greater Germany following the 1938 Anschluss.

== Plot ==
Johann Strauss I is firmly established as the leader of a dance orchestra in Vienna in the 1840s. While his sons Johann Strauss II and Josef have inherited their father's talent, he is strictly opposed to them being trained as composers by concertmaster Amon, a good friend of his. Johann II and Josef attend the Vienna Polytechnic under paternal pressure, but Johann junior soon drops out, causing a rift with his father. Johann Strauss junior then goes his own way and breaks off contact with his family. A few years later, he has finally made it and is celebrated as the new king of waltz. Father Johann secretly takes pride in his highly talented son's accomplishment. But then, at the age of only 44, Johann falls seriously ill with scarlet fever and dies, without having spoken to his son again.

Meanwhile, Josef has finished his studies at the Polytechnic and works as an engineer. He still loves music and spends every free minute composing. Although his father has since died, Josef, unlike his brother Johann, does not dare to rebel against his father's wish. When Johann junior learns of his brother's emotional dilemma, he gives Josef an opportunity to prove his musical skills for the first time at a New Year's Eve celebration. Josef's premiere is a great success, and he finally commits himself to music and abandons his engineering career.

Johann is in such great demand that he asks Josef to stand in for him on another occasion. Meanwhile, the youngest of the three brothers, Eduard Strauss, has grown up and also shows promise as a composer. However, he and Joseph are under the shadow of their much more famous brother, much to their chagrin. Eventually, it is old Amon who creates a group, called "Strauss", in which the three Strauss brothers jointly perform and inspire the masses with their waltz music.

== Cast ==
- Paul Hörbiger as Johann Strauss I
- Dagny Servaes as Anna Strauss, mother
- Maria Andergast as Lina Strauss
- Friedl Czepa as Regine Endlweber
- Gretl Theimer as Emilie Trampusch
- Fred Liewehr as Johann Strauss II
  - Karl Kalwoda as young Johann Strauss
- Hans Holt as Josef Strauss
  - Karl Heinz Kaiser as young Josef Strauss
- Fritz Lehmann as Eduard Strauss
- Hannes Grötzer as Edi Strauss's son as a child
- Karl Skraup as Amon, concertmaster
- Karl Binder as Wotruba, magistrate's assistant
- Julius Brandt as manufacturer
- Siegfried Breuer
- Brezina as Portier
- Lia Burg as Strauss's cook
- Franz Böheim as butler
- Rudolf Carl as Piscatschek, servant
- Hugo Drahosal as Lohndiener
- Karl Forest as Director des Etabl. 'To The Black Poodle'
- Emilie Giesrau as an elderly lady
- Pepi Glöckner-Kramer as charwoman
- Karl Hauser as Servant
- Willy Hein as Principal
- Rudi Horky as Kursekretär
- Walter Huber as mason
- Fritz Imhoff as Sigrista, magistrate
- Edi Klitsch as civil servant at the TU Wien
- Loidolt as kitchen maid
- Lorenzy as cashier
- Ferdinand Mayerhofer as Hotelportier
- Ernst Nadherny as Kurdirektor
- Erich Nikowitz as Official Wagner
- Carmen Perwolf as cook
- Ernst Reitter as Professor Kinzelberger
- Wilhelm Schich as Haslinger
- Maria Schnorrpfeil as Stubenmädchen
- Mimi Stelzer as cook
- Tomaselli as soldier
- Hans Unterkircher as Regierungsrat
- Kurt von Lessen as Count Jublinoff
- Mary Wawra as Mitzi
- Oskar Wegrostek as Gerichtsvollzieher
- Wiechert as Bauzeichner
