= Hans Olden =

Austrian actor

- Born: 30 June 1892; Vienna, Lower Austria; Austro-Hungarian Empire
- Died: 20 January 1975 (aged 82); Franzhausen, Lower Austria; Austria
- Other name: Josef Brandl
- Occupation: Actor
- Years active: 1931 - 1965 (film)

Hans Olden (1892–1975) was an Austrian stage and film actor. Olden appeared in more than eighty films during his career, mostly in Austria but occasionally also in Germany. He was a supporter of the Austrian Nazi Party, his interest in Nazism pre-dating the Anchluss by some years. After the Second World War Olden appeared in a number of Heimat films.

== Selected filmography ==
- Irene in Trouble (1932)
- Gently My Songs Entreat (1933)
- Catherine the Last (1936)
- An Orphan Boy of Vienna (1936)
- Diamonds (1937)
- Such Great Foolishness (1937)
- Der singende Tor (1939)
- Linen for Ireland (1939)
- Men Are That Way (1939)
- Vienna Tales (1940)
- My Daughter Lives in Vienna (1940)
- Love is Duty Free (1941)
- The Waitress Anna (1941)
- Two Happy People (1943)
- The White Dream (1943)
- Music in Salzburg (1944)
- The Heavenly Waltz (1948)
- The Freckle (1948)
- We've Just Got Married (1949)
- Two Times Lotte (1950)
- A Rare Lover (1950)
- Kissing Is No Sin (1950)
- The Fall of Valentin (1951)
- The Colourful Dream (1952)
- Knall and Fall as Imposters (1952)
- The Immortal Vagabond (1953)
- A Night in Venice (1953)
- Open Your Window (1953)
- Irene in Trouble (1953)
- Money from the Air (1954)
- The Big Star Parade (1954)
- Sarajevo (1955)
- Royal Hunt in Ischl (1955)
- Yes, Yes, Love in Tyrol (1955)
- Three Men in the Snow (1955)
- Emperor's Ball (1956)
- Charley's Aunt (1956)
- The Simple Girl (1957)
- The Count of Luxemburg (1957)
- Mikosch, the Pride of the Company (1958)
- Love, Girls and Soldiers (1958)
- Mikosch of the Secret Service (1959)
- La Paloma (1959)

== Bibliography ==
- Fritsche, Maria. Homemade Men In Postwar Austrian Cinema: Nationhood, Genre and Masculinity. Berghahn Books, 2013.
