= Rendezvous in Vienna (1936 film) =

1936 film

- Directed by: Victor Janson
- Written by: H.W. Becker; Julius Horst
- Produced by: Ottmar Ostermayr
- Starring: Magda Schneider; Wolf Albach-Retty; Lizzi Holzschuh
- Cinematography: Eduard Hoesch
- Edited by: Hans Wolff
- Music by: Willy Schmidt-Gentner
- Production company: Mondial Film
- Distributed by: Lux Film; Siegel-Monopolfilm (Germany)
- Release date: 28 February 1936
- Running time: 82 minutes
- Country: Austria
- Language: German

Rendezvous in Vienna (German: Rendezvous in Wien) is a 1936 Austrian romantic comedy film directed by Victor Janson and starring Magda Schneider, Wolf Albach-Retty and Lizzi Holzschuh. It was shot at the Rosenhügel Studios in Vienna. The film's sets were designed by the art director Julius von Borsody.

== Cast ==
- Magda Schneider as Gusti Aigner
- Wolf Albach-Retty as Franz Lenhardt - Musiker
- Lizzi Holzschuh as Elly Marschner
- Adele Sandrock as Frau Hofrat Aigner
- Leo Slezak as Marschner - Wiener Verleger
- Georg Alexander as Percy Poole - englischer Verleger
- Fritz Odemar as Lionel, sein Kammerdiener
- Rudolf Carl as Huber, der Wirt
- Tibor Halmay as Herr von Kelety
- Fritz Imhoff as Der Hausmeister
- Wilhelm Schich as Bus-Chauffeur Dobringer
- Franz Schier as Cafe Singer
- Hanns Obonya as Cafe Busboy

== Bibliography ==
- Fritz, Walter. Die österreichischen Spielfilme der Tonfilmzeit (1929-1938). Österreichisches Filmarchiv, 1968.
- Von Dassanowsky, Robert. Screening Transcendence: Film Under Austrofascism and the Hollywood Hope, 1933-1938. Indiana University Press, 2018
