= Erich von Neusser =

- Born: 23 October 1902; Brünn, Austria-Hungary
- Died: 30 August 1957 (aged 54); Vienna, Austria
- Occupation: Producer
- Years active: 1929-1956 (film)

Erich von Neusser (23 October 1902 – 30 August 1957) was an Austrian film producer.

== Selected filmography ==
- Turandot, Princess of China (1935)
- The Girl Irene (1936)
- Donogoo (1936)
- My Son the Minister (1937)
- Diamonds (1937)
- A Girl Goes Ashore (1938)
- A Mother's Love (1939)
- Woman in the River (1939)
- Judgement Day (1940)
- My Daughter Lives in Vienna (1940)
- The White Dream (1943)
- The Emperor Waltz (1953)
- The Congress Dances (1955)
- Espionage (1955)

== Bibliography ==
- Giesen, Rolf. Nazi Propaganda Films: A History and Filmography. McFarland & Company, 2003.
