= Walter Reisch =

American screenwriter (1903–1983)

- Born: May 23, 1903; Vienna, Cisleithania, Austria-Hungary
- Died: March 28, 1983 (aged 79); Los Angeles, California, U.S.
- Occupations: film director, writer, screenwriter, lyricist
- Years active: 1925–1959
- Spouses: Poldi Dur (1937–1983)

Walter Reisch (May 23, 1903 – March 28, 1983) was an Austrian-born director and screenwriter. He also wrote lyrics to several songs featured in his films, one popular title is "Flieger, grüß mir die Sonne". He was married to the dancer and actress Poldi Dur and was the cousin of Georg Kreisler.

== Selected filmography ==
- The Curse (1924)
- A Waltz by Strauss (1925)
- Colonel Redl (1925)
- Kissing Is No Sin (1926)
- Pratermizzi (1927)
- Rhenish Girls and Rhenish Wine (1927)
- The Indiscreet Woman (1927)
- Carnival Magic (1927)
- Darling of the Dragoons (1928)
- It's You I Have Loved (1929)
- The Merry Widower (1929)
- The Woman Everyone Loves Is You (1929)
- The Night Belongs to Us (1929)
- Prisoner Number Seven (1929)
- The Black Domino (1929)
- The Hero of Every Girl's Dream (1929)
- Black Forest Girl (1929)
- The Flute Concert of Sanssouci (1930)
- The Song Is Ended (1930)
- Never Trust a Woman (1930)
- A Gentleman for Hire (1930)
- Two Hearts in Waltz Time (1930)
- Fire in the Opera House (1930)
- Hocuspocus (1930)
- Danube Waltz (1930)
- The Merry Wives of Vienna (1931)
- The Theft of the Mona Lisa (1931)
- In the Employ of the Secret Service (1931)
- The Prince of Arcadia (1932)
- A Blonde Dream (1932)
- The Countess of Monte Cristo (1932)
- Happy Ever After (1932)
- Gently My Songs Entreat (1933)
- Season in Cairo (1933)
- The Empress and I (1933)
- The Only Girl (1933)
- Unfinished Symphony (1934)
- So Ended a Great Love (1934)
- Two Hearts in Waltz Time (1934)
- Episode (1935)
- The Divine Spark (1935)
- Silhouettes (1936)
- The Great Waltz (1938)
- Ninotchka (1939)
- My Love Came Back (1940)
- Comrade X (1940) (story)
- That Hamilton Woman (1941)
- That Uncertain Feeling (1941)
- The Heavenly Body (1944)
- Gaslight (1944)
- Song of Scheherazade (1947)
- The Mating Season (1951)
- The Model and the Marriage Broker (1951)
- Titanic (1953)
- The Mosquito (1954)
- Teenage Rebel (1956)
- The Cornet (1956)
- Just Once a Great Lady (1957)
- Stopover Tokyo (1957)
- Journey to the Center of the Earth (1959)
