= His Daughter is Called Peter (1936 film) =

- Directed by: Heinz Helbig; Willy Schmidt-Gentner
- Written by: Edith Zellweker (novel); Erich Ebermayer
- Produced by: Ottmar Ostermayr
- Starring: Karl Ludwig Diehl; Traudl Stark; Paul Hörbiger; Olga Chekhova
- Cinematography: Otto Martini
- Music by: Willy Schmidt-Gentner
- Production company: Mondial Internationale Filmindustrie
- Distributed by: Kiba Kinobetriebsanstalt
- Release date: 23 October 1936
- Running time: 98 minutes
- Country: Austria
- Language: German

His Daughter is Called Peter (German: Seine Tochter ist der Peter) is a 1936 Austrian drama film directed by Heinz Helbig and Willy Schmidt-Gentner and starring Karl Ludwig Diehl, Traudl Stark and Paul Hörbiger. Stark was a child actor, considered a German-speaking answer to Hollywood's Shirley Temple.

The film was remade in 1955 with the same title.

== Cast ==
- Karl Ludwig Diehl as Ingenieur Max Klaar
- Traudl Stark as Elisabeth Klaar - known as Peter
- Paul Hörbiger as Dr. Felix Sandhofer
- Olga Chekhova as Nora Noir
- Maria Andergast as Kinga Gerold
- Frida Richard as Kathi
- Robert Valberg as General-Direktor Tarnay
- Ekkehard Arendt as Baron von Lichtenstein
- Richard Waldemar as Hotelportier
- Therese Loewinger as Die Bodenseerin
- Wilhelm Schich as Chauffeur
- Hans Kammauf as Chauffeur
- Paul Löwinger
- Norbert Rohringer

== Bibliography ==
- Hake, Sabine. Popular Cinema of the Third Reich. University of Texas Press, 2001.
