= Rudolf Carl =

Austrian actor

- Born: 19 June 1899; Lundenburg, Austria-Hungary
- Died: 15 January 1987 (aged 87); Graz, Austria
- Years active: 1934–1969

Rudolf Carl (19 June 1899 – 15 January 1987) was an Austrian actor who appeared in more than 150 German language films between 1934 and 1969. He also directed two films Der Leberfleck and Dort in der Wachau.

== Selected filmography ==
- Polish Blood (1934)
- Frasquita (1934)
- A Star Fell from Heaven (1934)
- The Young Baron Neuhaus (1934)
- Little Mother (1935)
- Immortal Melodies (1935)
- Suburban Cabaret (1935)
- Heaven on Earth (1935)
- Dance Music (1935)
- The Cossack and the Nightingale (1935)
- Rendezvous in Vienna (1936)
- Hannerl and Her Lovers (1936)
- Where the Lark Sings (1936)
- The Postman from Longjumeau (1936)
- The Love of the Maharaja (1936)
- Adventure in Warsaw (1937)
- The Vagabonds (1937)
- Little County Court (1938)
- The Optimist (1938)
- Woman in the River (1939)
- Immortal Waltz (1939)
- Linen from Ireland (1939)
- Roses in Tyrol (1940)
- Her Private Secretary (1940)
- The White Dream (1943)
- The Freckle (1948)
- Scandal at the Embassy (1950)
- No Sin on the Alpine Pastures (1950)
- The Fall of Valentin (1951)
- The Mine Foreman (1952)
- Ideal Woman Sought (1952)
- Starfish (1952)
- Knall and Fall as Imposters (1952)
- Knall and Fall as Detectives (1952)
- Hello Porter (1952)
- The Landlady of Maria Wörth (1952)
- The Bachelor Trap (1953)
- Young Heart Full of Love (1953)
- On the Green Meadow (1953)
- The Dairymaid of St. Kathrein (1955)
- Marriage Sanitarium (1955)
- Royal Hunt in Ischl (1955)
- The Doctor's Secret (1955)
- The Blue Danube (1955)
- His Daughter is Called Peter (1955)
- Two Bavarians in St. Pauli (1956)
- Her Corporal (1956)
- The Stolen Trousers (1956)
- Forest Liesel (1956)
- And Who Is Kissing Me? (1956)
- War of the Maidens (1957)
- The Poacher of the Silver Wood (1957)
- Candidates for Marriage (1958)
- When the Bells Sound Clearly (1959)
- Final Accord (1960)
- The White Horse Inn (1960)
- Die Fledermaus (1962)
- Dance with Me Into the Morning (1962)
- Wedding Night in Paradise (1962)
- Our Crazy Nieces (1963)
- The Model Boy (1963)
