= Hans Holt =

Austrian actor (1909–2001)

- Born: 22 November 1909; Vienna, Austria-Hungary (now Austria)
- Died: 8 March 2001 (aged 91); Baden, Austria
- Occupation: Actor
- Years active: 1935–1990

Hans Holt (22 November 1909 – 3 August 2001) was an Austrian film actor. He appeared in more than 100 films between 1935 and 1990.

== Selected filmography ==
- Confetti (1936)
- Hannerl and Her Lovers (1936)
- Catherine the Last (1936)
- Florentine (1937)
- Roxy and the Wonderteam (1938)
- The Scoundrel (1939)
- Immortal Waltz (1939)
- Stars of Variety (1939)
- A Mother's Love (1939)
- Roses in Tyrol (1940)
- Judgement Day (1940)
- Whom the Gods Love (1942)
- Black on White (1943)
- Dir zuliebe (1944)
- The Angel with the Trumpet (1948)
- Wedding with Erika (1950)
- When the Evening Bells Ring (1951)
- Queen of the Night (1951)
- Spring on Ice (1951)
- 1. April 2000 (1952)
- My Wife Is Being Stupid (1952)
- The Mine Foreman (1952)
- Lavender (1953)
- On the Green Meadow (1953)
- The Emperor Waltz (1953)
- Love and Trumpets (1954)
- Let the Sun Shine Again (1955)
- Die Trapp-Familie (1956)
- The Trapp Family in America (1958)
- I'll Carry You in My Arms (1958)
- Rendezvous in Vienna (1959)
- Almost Angels (1962) – Director Eisinger
- Stolen Heaven (1974)
- Goetz von Berlichingen of the Iron Hand (1979)
- Der Bockerer (1981)

== Decorations and awards ==
- 1963 Austrian Cross of Honour for Science and Art, 1st class
- 1966 Josef Kainz Medal for the role of George in Who's Afraid of Virginia Woolf
- 1987 German Film Award for his work in German films
