= Insolent and in Love =

1948 film

- Directed by: Hans Schweikart
- Written by: Fred Andreas (novel); Hans Fritz Beckmann; Ernst von Salomon
- Produced by: Gerhard Staab
- Starring: Johannes Heesters; Gabriele Reismüller; Charlott Daudert
- Cinematography: Bruno Stephan
- Edited by: Ludolf Grisebach
- Music by: Peter Kreuder
- Production company: Bavaria Film
- Distributed by: Emka-Filmverleih
- Release date: 25 December 1948
- Running time: 92 minutes
- Country: Germany
- Language: German

Insolent and in Love (German: Frech und verliebt) is a 1948 German romantic comedy film directed by Hans Schweikart and starring Johannes Heesters, Gabriele Reismüller and Charlott Daudert. It was shot at the Bavaria Studios in Munich. The film's sets were designed by the art director Hans Sohnle. The film was made in 1944 but it did not receive a domestic release until 1948. In 1950 it was distributed in Austria by Sascha Film.

== Cast ==
- Johannes Heesters as Dr. Peter Schild, Ingenieur
- Gabriele Reismüller as Clarisse Pernrieder
- Charlott Daudert as Isolde, Tänzerin
- Carl-Heinz Schroth as Cyrus Kracker, Schauspieler
- Paul Kemp as Der alte Pernrieder, Clarissas Großvater
- Paul Dahlke as Hennemann, Diener und Chauffeur
- Melanie Horeschowsky as Klara Pernrieder
- Ernst Waldow as Schleemann, Onkel von Peter Schild
- Erna Sellmer as Frau Wiedehopf
- Paul Westermeier as Walter Lemke, Boxer
- Franz Schafheitlin as Justus Pernrieder, Fabrikant
- Ernst Legal as Nordboden, Besitzer des Detektivbüros
- Victor Janson as Hausknecht
- Rudolf Reiff as Besitzer des Landhotels
- Ernst Dernburg as Arzt
- Angelo Ferrari as Italienischer Reisender
- Alexander Fischer-Marich as Alter Kellner
- Emmy Flemmich as Marie, Köchin
- Rosemarie Grosser as Dienstmädchen
- Willem Holsboer as Herr Wiedehopf
- Alois Krüger
- Else Kündinger as Ältere Hausbewohnerin
- Ludwig Meier as Hansi, Kind
- Else Mereny
- Hanns Olsen
- Hans Paetsch as Ober
- Werner Pledath as Gast
- Eva Wagner as Mariele, Kind
- Inge Weigand as Zigarettenmädchen
- Eduard Wenck as Autobusfahrgast
- Arthur Wiesner as Gepäckträger

== See also ==
- Überläufer

== Bibliography ==
- Eric Rentschler. German Film & Literature. Routledge, 2013.
