= Beautiful Wilhelmine =

West German historical television series

- Genre: Historical drama
- Based on: Die schöne Wilhelmine by Ernst von Salomon
- Written by: Karl Wittlinger
- Directed by: Rolf von Sydow
- Starring: Anja Kruse; Rainer Hunold; Johannes Heesters
- Composer: Günther Fischer
- Country of origin: West Germany
- Original language: German
- No. of series: 1
- No. of episodes: 4

Original release
- Network: ZDF
- Release: 6 September – 16 September 1984

Beautiful Wilhelmine (German: Die schöne Wilhelmine) is a West German historical television series broadcast on ZDF in four episodes in 1984. It is an adaptation of the novel Die schöne Wilhelmine by Ernst von Salomon. It is based on the life of Wilhelmine, Gräfin von Lichtenau and her relationship with the Prussian King Frederick William II of Prussia.

== Cast ==
- Anja Kruse as Wilhelmine
- Rainer Hunold as Kronprinz, later Friedrich Wilhelm II
- Andreas Seyferth as Hannes
- Herbert Stass as Friedrich II.
- Johannes Heesters as Marschall Keith
- Beatrice Richter as Luise
- Silvia Reize as Elisabeth
- Liesel Christ as Landgräfin
- Hans-Werner Bussinger as Dr. Heim
- Raphael Wilczek as Matuschkyn
- Jean-Claude Brialy as Casanova
- Margit Geissler as Christiane
- Wolfgang Höper as Bischoffswerder
- Marie Versini as Mme. Girard
- Ljuba Krbová as Minettchen

== Bibliography ==
- Klossner, Michael. The Europe of 1500–1815 on Film and Television: A Worldwide Filmography of Over 2550 Works, 1895 Through 2000. McFarland & Company, 2002.
