= To Be God One Time =

1942 film

- Directed by: Hans H. Zerlett
- Written by: Hans Gustl Kernmayr; Fritz Koselka
- Produced by: Ottmar Ostermayr
- Starring: Hans Moser; Irene von Meyendorff; Lotte Lang
- Cinematography: Bruno Stephan
- Edited by: Ludolf Grisebach
- Music by: Leo Leux
- Production company: Bavaria Film
- Distributed by: Deutsche Filmvertriebs
- Release date: 10 November 1942
- Running time: 93 minutes
- Country: Germany
- Language: German

To Be God One Time (German: Einmal der liebe Herrgott sein) is a 1942 German comedy film directed by Hans H. Zerlett and starring Hans Moser, Irene von Meyendorff and Lotte Lang. It was shot at the Bavaria Studios in Munich. The film's sets were designed by the art directors Rudolf Pfenninger and Ludwig Reiber.

== Synopsis ==
Veteran hotel employee Karl Gschwandtner finally achieves his lifelong dream of becoming the head porter. Taking his new authority to a "divine" extreme, he begins meddling in the romantic lives of the guests, leading to a series of chaotic misunderstandings. His overconfidence backfires when his interference accidentally allows a thief to rob the hotel, resulting in his immediate dismissal. To redeem himself, Karl goes undercover as a guest to catch the criminal, eventually realising he is far happier in his more humble original position.

== Cast ==
- Hans Moser as Karl Gschwandtner
- Irene von Meyendorff as Marie Christine Passecker
- Lotte Lang as Wally - Zeitungsverkäuferin
- Fritz Odemar as Hoteldieb Pawlowitsch
- Iván Petrovich as Professor Freiburg
- Willem Holsboer as Flori Tupfinger
- Anton Pointner as Hoteldirektor Seiffert
- Hans Zesch-Ballot as Clusius - Theaterdirektor
- Joseph Offenbach as Grasl, Hotelportier
- Lisa Siebel as Eva Corelli
- Margit Symo as Elvira del Basto
- Viktor Afritsch as Ludwig Reißbach
- Ruth Eweler as Elly Reißbach
- Maria Eiselt as Putzeli
- Janne Furch as Sophie - Stubenmädchen
- Fritz Reiff as Falkner - Portier
- Rudolf Vogel as Fernandez
- Otto Brüggemann as Franz, Kellner

== Bibliography ==
- Klaus, Ulrich J. Deutsche Tonfilme: Jahrgang 1942. Klaus-Archiv, 1988.
- Weinstein, Valerie. Antisemitism in Film Comedy in Nazi Germany. Indiana University Press, 2019.
