= Alfred Böhm =

Austrian actor and film director

- Born: March 23, 1920; Vienna, Austria
- Died: September 22, 1995 (aged 75); Ströblitz, Lower Austria, Austria
- Occupation: Actor

Alfred Böhm (23 March 1920 - 22 September 1995) was an Austrian actor and director. He was the brother of fellow actors Franz Böheim and Carlo Böhm. He was known for directing the film Die Orchesterprobe (The Orchestra Rehearsal), and acting in Patient aus Leidenschaft (Patient With Passion) and Herr im Haus bin ich (I Am the Master of the House).
