= Der Fall Molander =

1945 film

- Directed by: Georg Wilhelm Pabst
- Written by: Ernst Hasselbach; Alfred Karrasch; Per Schwenzen
- Produced by: Adolf Hannemann
- Starring: Paul Wegener
- Cinematography: Willi Kuhle
- Edited by: Elisabeth Pewny
- Distributed by: Terra-Filmverleih
- Release date: 1945
- Country: Germany
- Language: German

The Molander Case (German: Der Fall Molander) is a 1945 German drama film directed by Georg Wilhelm Pabst. The movie is based on the novel Die Sternengeige by Alfred Karrasch. On August 28, 1944, Pabst started shooting the movie for Terra Film. Just as shooting had completed at the Barrandov Studios in Prague and editing had already begun, Prague was occupied by the Red Army and Pabst was forced to abandon the work. The film is considered lost.

== Plot ==
The young violinist Fritz Molander inherited a Stradivarius, the so-called “star violin”, from his father, a famous conductor. Molander junior has a lot of talent and has already been made first violinist at the State Opera. But he wants more. His father died early, having achieved great fame, and young Fritz seeks to emulate him. Ever since the father's untimely demise, the family has been in considerable economic difficulties. Fritz is determined to change this situation. When Molander's concert agency demands a considerable advance payment, he is forced to sell his precious Stradivarius violin. Now Molander can finally give unlimited concerts and is celebrated by both critics and audiences. But suddenly the police arrest him, having established that the alleged Stradivarius is a fake.

Elisabeth Molander, the artist's sister, talks to her secret fiancé, the young public prosecutor Holk, who is working on the "Molander case". While she offers Holk to break off the engagement because of this "scandal", he wants to resign from this case as a public prosecutor in order not to get into a conflict of interest. Elisabeth then turns to her fiancé's father, the old Attorney General Holk. He decides to handle the case himself. His investigation eventually reveals that the old instrument maker Dannemann had exchanged the star violin for a low-value but not immediately recognizable fake during a repair. For him, it was not about the money, but, as an obsessed instrument lover, about owning an eminent piece of violin making culture.

Fritz Molander is released from prison and rehabilitated. Old Holk also ensures that his son and fiancée can now get together again, officially appear as a couple and finally get married. While Elisabeth can finally introduce her fiancé to her mother, the sounds coaxed from the Stradivarius by Fritz Molander ring out the open window.

== Cast ==
- Paul Wegener as Holk, Prosecutor General
- Irene von Meyendorff as Elisabeth Molander
- Werner Hinz as Holk, Prosecutor
- Erich Ponto as Dannemann
- Eva Maria Meineke
- Robert Tessen as Fritz Molander
- Harald Paulsen
- Elisabeth Markus as Frau Molander
- Otto Wernicke as Kunsthändler
