= Klaramaria Skala =

Austrian actress

- Born: 30 January 1921; Vienna, Austria
- Died: 27 June 2006 (aged 85); Füssen, Germany
- Occupation: Actress
- Years active: 1942-1990 (film)

Klaramaria Skala (1921-2006) was an Austrian stage and film actress. She appeared in the 1947 historical musical film It's Only Love.

== Selected filmography ==
- Vienna Blood (1942)
- Late Love (1943)
- It's Only Love (1947)
- A Heart Beats for You (1949)
- Hot Pavements of Cologne (1967)

== Bibliography ==
- Mitchell, Charles P. The Great Composers Portrayed on Film, 1913 Through 2002. McFarland & Company, 2004.
