= The Eternal Spring =

1940 film

- Directed by: Fritz Kirchhoff
- Written by: Hans Joachim Beyer; Johannes Linke (novel); Felix Lützkendorf
- Produced by: Ottmar Ostermayr
- Starring: Eugen Klöpfer; Bernhard Minetti; Lina Carstens
- Cinematography: Josef Illig; Franz Koch
- Edited by: Gottlieb Madl
- Music by: Anton Profes
- Production company: Bavaria Film
- Distributed by: Bavaria Film
- Release date: 19 January 1940
- Running time: 87 minutes
- Country: Germany
- Language: German

The Eternal Spring (German: Der ewige Quell) is a 1940 German drama film directed by Fritz Kirchhoff and starring Eugen Klöpfer, Bernhard Minetti and Lina Carstens. It is part of the tradition of Heimatfilm.

It was shot at the Bavaria Studios in Munich. The film's sets were designed by the art directors Ludwig Reiber and Rudolf Pfenninger.

== Cast ==
- Eugen Klöpfer as Lohhofbauer
- Bernhard Minetti as Wolfgang Lusinger
- Lina Carstens as Lohhofbäuerin
- Käte Merk as Maria
- Alexander Trojan as Hannes
- Hannes Keppler as Ludwig
- Albert Hörrmann as Dr. Iwan Wollinsky
- Carl Wery as Sprecher der Bauern
- Georg Vogelsang as Großknecht
- Luis Rainer as Alter Lusinger
- Elise Aulinger as Moosbäuerin
- Fritz Reiff as Richter
- Otto Fassler as 1. Herr der Regierungs-Kommission
- Julius Königsheim as Knecht Toni
- Ludwig Schmid-Wildy as Wirt
- Charles Willy Kayser as 2. Her der Regierungs-Kommission
- Heinz Burkart as Juwelier
- Heinrich Hauser as Goldschmied
- Eugen Schöndorfer as Beamter
- Julius Frey as Metzger
- Hans Hanauer as Bauer
- Erich Teibler as Bub
- Georg Holl as Gendarm
- Fritz Wagner as 2. Knecht
- Else Sensburg as Großmagd
- Willimarie Knoll as Jungmagd
- Konrad Feldmaier as 1. Knecht

== Bibliography ==
- Hake, Sabine (2002). German National Cinema. Routledge. ISBN 978-0-415-08901-2.
