= The Millionaire (1947 film) =

1947 film directed by Robert A. Stemmle

- Directed by: Robert A. Stemmle
- Written by: Erna Fentsch; Robert A. Stemmle
- Produced by: Georg Fiebiger; Fred Lyssa
- Starring: Hans Moser; Annie Rosar; Hans Holt
- Cinematography: Bruno Stephan
- Edited by: Adolf Schlyssleder
- Music by: Adolf Steimel
- Production company: Bavaria Film
- Distributed by: Schorcht Filmverleih
- Release date: 17 January 1947
- Running time: 81 minutes
- Country: Germany
- Language: German

The Millionaire (German: Der Millionär or Geld ins Haus) is a 1947 German comedy film directed by Robert A. Stemmle and starring Hans Moser, Annie Rosar and Hans Holt. It was made by the Munich-based Bavaria Film at the company's Bavaria Studios in the city. The film's sets were designed by the art director Hans Sohnle. The film was shot during the final stages of the Second World War, but wasn't released until 1947.

== Synopsis ==
Leopold Habernal, lives a quiet, modest life as a postman. When he unexpectedly inherits a large sum of money, he suddenly becomes an object of desire for several unmarried woman in the town, leading also to resentment amongst his former male friends. Ultimately he is able to use his money to benefit everyone.

== Cast ==
- Hans Moser as Leopold Habernal, Postbote
- Annie Rosar as Frau Meierhofer, seine Wirtin
- Hans Holt as Franz Lichtenegger, Komponist
- Alfred Neugebauer as Kanzleirat Lichtenegger, sein Onkel
- Franz Pfaudler as Krüger, Schuster
- Gabriele Reismüller as Marianne, seine Tochter
- Karl Skraup as Robert Füringer, Friseur
- Lotte Lang as Anni Schober, Inhaberin eines Korsettgeschäfts
- Oskar Sima as Draxler, Fuhrwerksbesitzer
- Theodor Loos as Schreyegg, Rechtsanwalt und Notar
- Adolf Gondrell as Postvorstand
- Änne Bruck as Seine Frau
- Ernst Fritz Fürbringer as Rienösl, Advokat
- Bruno Hübner as Steindl, Reisender
- Lisa Helwig as Frau Steindl
- Ellen Hille as Frau Staberger, Metzgermeisterin

== Bibliography ==
- Jill Nelmes & Jule Selbo. Women Screenwriters: An International Guide. Palgrave Macmillan, 2015.
