= Elisabeth Lennartz =

German stage actress

- Born: 13 November 1902; Koblenz, German Empire
- Died: 14 May 2001 (aged 98); Küsnacht, Switzerland
- Occupation: Actress

Elisabeth Lennartz (1902–2001) was a German stage actress. Although she worked primarily in the theatre, she also appeared in several films. Lennartz was an associate of Marlene Dietrich in 1920s Berlin.

In 1928 she starred in the play Katharina Knie by Carl Zuckmayer.

She was married to the actor Gustav Knuth.

== Selected filmography ==
- In the Name of the King (1924)
- Hell on Earth (1931)
- I by Day, You by Night (1932)
- Her First Experience (1939)
- The Girl at the Reception (1940)
- If We All Were Angels (1956)

== Bibliography ==
- Spoto, Donald. Blue Angel: The Life of Marlene Dietrich. Rowman & Littlefield, 2000.
- Wagener, Hans. Carl Zuckmayer Criticism: Tracing Endangered Fame. Camden House, 1995.
