= Oskar Wagner =

Austrian composer (1901–1972)

- Born: 19 January 1901; Vienna, Austro-Hungarian Empire
- Died: 8 September 1972 (aged 71); Vienna, Austria
- Occupation: Composer
- Years active: 1940-1956 (film)

Oskar Wagner (19 January 1901 – 8 September 1972) was an Austrian composer, who worked on twenty film scores including It's Only Love, portraying the life of Franz Schubert.

== Selected filmography ==
- The Endless Road (1943)
- The Song of the Nightingale (1944)
- I Need You (1944)
- Bravo, Little Thomas (1945)
- It's Only Love (1947)
- The Freckle (1948)
- Law of Love (1949)
- A Heart Beats for You (1949)

== Bibliography ==
- Fritsche, Maria. Homemade Men in Postwar Austrian Cinema: Nationhood, Genre and Masculinity. Berghahn Books, 2013.
