= A Man Wants to Get to Germany =

1934 film

- Ein Mann will nach Deutschland
- Directed by: Paul Wegener
- Written by: Philipp Lothar Mayring; Fred Andreas
- Based on: Ein Mann will nach Deutschland by Fred Andreas
- Production company: UFA GmbH
- Release date: 1934
- Running time: 89 minutes
- Country: Germany
- Language: German
- Budget: 400,000 ℛℳ

A Man Wants to Get to Germany (German: Ein Mann will nach Deutschland) is a 1934 film directed by Paul Wegener.

== Cast ==
- Karl Ludwig Diehl
- Brigitte Horney
- Siegfried Schürenberg

== Production ==
It cost 400,000 ℛℳ (equivalent to $2,000,000 in 2021) to produce. Philipp Lothar Mayring and Fred Andreas wrote a screenplay based on Andreas' book.

== Release ==
The film was approved by the censors on 24 July 1934, and premiered on 26 July. It was banned in February 1940 for pacifism, but was unbanned in March after UFA GmbH complained about lost revenue to Joseph Goebbels.

== Works cited ==
- Welch, David (1983). Propaganda and the German Cinema: 1933-1945. I.B. Tauris. ISBN 9781860645204.
