= Bernhard Minetti =

German actor (1905–1998)

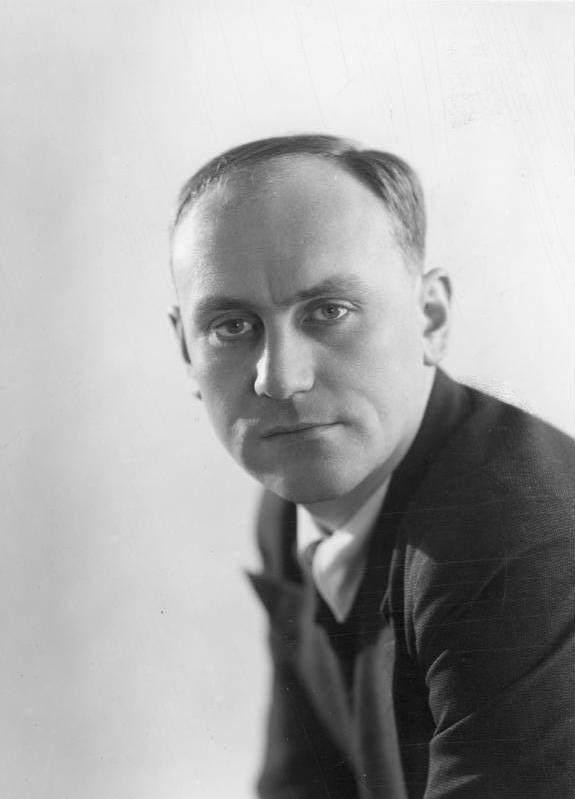
- Minetti in 1934
- Born: 26 January 1905; Kiel, Kingdom of Prussia, German Empire
- Died: 12 October 1998 (aged 93); Berlin, Germany
- Occupation: Actor
- Years active: 1931–1996

Bernhard Theodor Henry Minetti (26 January 1905 – 12 October 1998) was a German actor. He appeared in 50 films between 1931 and 1996, but is mostly known for his distinguished stage career.

His children, Hans-Peter Minetti and Jennifer Minetti, were also actors.

== Selected filmography ==
- The Murderer Dimitri Karamazov (1930) as Ivan Karamazov
- Berlin-Alexanderplatz (1931) as Reinhold
- Joan of Arc (1935) as a bailiff
- My Life for Maria Isabella (1935) as Von Hackenberg
- Der Kaiser von Kalifornien (1936) as the stranger
- An Enemy of the People (1937) as Minister
- Alarm in Peking (1937) as Tu-Hang
- Revolutionary Wedding (1938) as Montaloup
- By a Silken Thread (1938) as Dr. Heinrich Breuer
- Secret Code LB 17 (1938) as Club Manager Bjelinski
- Woman Without a Past (1939) as Igor Costa
- Robert Koch (1939) as Göhrte the exorcist
- Friedrich Schiller – The Triumph of a Genius (1940) as Franz Moor
- The Eternal Spring (1940) as Wolfgang Lusinger
- The Rothschilds (1940) as Fouché
- Tiefland (1954) as Don Sebastian, Marquis de Roccabruna
- It (1966) as Customer
- The Left-Handed Woman (1978) as The publisher
