= Rolf von Sydow =

German film director and screenwriter (1924–2019)

- Born: 18 June 1924; Wiesbaden, Germany
- Died: 16 June 2019 (aged 94); Berlin, Germany
- Occupations: Film director and author
- Spouse(s): Sabine Eggerth (divorced); Susanna von Sydow

Rolf von Sydow (18 June 1924 – 16 June 2019) was a German film director and author.

== Life ==
Von Sydow worked as a film director in Germany. His mother Ilse Bayerthal was designated by German law a "half-Jew" so her son Rolf was accordingly a "quarter-Jew" Mischling which greatly impacted him as a child and later restricted his career options in Nazi Germany. He served as a soldier in the Wehrmacht, hiding his partial Jewish ancestry, was wounded and awarded medals for his combat service.

In 1947 he began working in Coburg at the local theater, and then he took up radio productions at Rundfunk im amerikanischen Sektor in West Berlin. He later worked on popular film adaptations of a number of novels by Rosamunde Pilcher along with the enormously popular German TV series Zwei Münchner in Hamburg in the late 1980s and early 1990s.

Besides his extensive radio and film work, he was the author of numerous successful autobiographies including one describing life experiences as a prisoner of war after Operation Overlord in Normandy in 1944. He married on three occasions.

== Works by Sydow ==
=== As film director ===
- 1957: Mensch und Technik (short educational film about the Bundeswehr)
- 1958: Der Alltag des Soldaten (short educational film about the Bundeswehr)
- 1958: Der Sanitätsdienst in der Bundeswehr (educational film about the Bundeswehr)
- 1960: … und noch frech dazu!
- 1962: Dicke Luft
- 1969: Der verlogene Akt
- 1983: How Would You Like to Have It?
- 1989: Bangkok Story — (based on a novel by Detlef Bernd Blettenberg)

=== As television director ===
- 1960: Mein Freund Hazy
- 1961: Das nasse Leben – Erinnerungen einer Brustschwimmerin
- 1962: Typisch Lucy (TV series, 6 episodes)
- 1962: Mit Musik kommt alles wieder
- 1962: Warten auf Dodo — (based on a play by Eugène K. Ilyin and Gerard Willem Van Loon)
- 1962: Drei Jungen und ein Mädchen — (based on a play by Roger Ferdinand)
- 1963: Die Nacht der Schrecken — (based on a short story by Anton Chekhov)
- 1963: Hasenklein kann nichts dafür — (based on a play by Hans Mahner-Mons)
- 1963: Der eingebildete Doktor — (based on a play by Hans Weigel)
- 1963: Der Liebesdienst — (based on the short story A Service of Love by O. Henry)
- 1964: Amouren — (based on the play Present Laughter)
- 1964: Frühling mit Verspätung — (based on the play And Suddenly It's Spring by Jack Popplewell)
- 1964–1965: Die Gäste des Felix Hechinger (TV series, 8 episodes)
- 1964–1965: Unsere große Schwester (TV series, 13 episodes)
- 1964: Kennen Sie Heberlein?
- 1965: Weekend in Paradise — (based on a play by Franz Arnold and Ernst Bach)
- 1965: Schlußrunde — (remake of The Final Test, 1953)
- 1965: Olivia — (based on the play Love In Idleness)
- 1965: Man soll den Onkel nicht vergiften
- 1966: Das Missgeschick, ein Lord zu sein — (based on the play The Reluctant Peer)
- 1966: Wie wär's, Monsieur? — (based on the play Croque-monsieur by Marcel Mithois)
- 1966: Träume in der Mausefalle — (based on the play The Keep by Gwyn Thomas)
- 1966: Minister gesucht — (based on a play by Fritz Eckhardt)
- 1966: Die Tage und Nächte der Beebee Fenstermaker — (based on the play The Days and Nights of BeeBee Fenstermaker)
- 1966: Quadrille — (based on the play Quadrille)
- 1966: Das Leben in meiner Hand — (based on the play The Life In My Hands by Peter Ustinov)
- 1966: Der Floh im Ohr — (based on the play A Flea in Her Ear)
- 1966: Das Experiment
- 1967: Also gut! Lassen wir uns scheiden! — (based on the play Divorçons by Victorien Sardou and Émile de Najac)
- 1967: Blut floss auf Blendings Castle — (based on a Blandings story by P. G. Wodehouse)
- 1967: Mein Freund Harvey — (based on the play Harvey)
- 1967: Unser Herr Diener — (based on the play The Admirable Crichton)
- 1967: Ich will Mjussow sprechen — (based on a play by Valentin Kataev)
- 1967: Liebesgeschichten: Der Garten (TV series episode) — (based on a play by Tim Aspinall)
- 1967: Auf Sieg? Auf Platz? – Auf Liebe! — (based on the musical Let It Ride)
- 1967: Lord Arthur Saviles Verbrechen — (based on the short story Lord Arthur Savile's Crime)
- 1968: Flachsmann the Educator — (based on a play by Otto Ernst)
- 1968: Heim und Herd — (based on Home and the Heart by Rosemary Anne Sisson)
- 1968: Meinungsverschiedenheiten — (based on Difference of Opinion by Campbell Singer and George Ross)
- 1968: Der deutsche Meister — (screenplay by Wolfgang Menge)
- 1968: Schatzsucher unserer Tage (TV series, 13 episodes)
- 1968: Der Idiot (TV miniseries, based on the novel The Idiot)
- 1969: Ein Charleston für Lady Macbeth — (based on a play by Frédéric Valmain)
- 1969: Bitte recht freundlich, es wird geschossen — (remake of Peter Yeldham's Watch the Birdies, 1966)
- 1970: Bärenfang in Hinterwang
- 1970: Wie ein Blitz (TV miniseries) — (remake of Francis Durbridge's Bat Out of Hell, 1966)
- 1970: Das Mädchen meiner Träume — (based on Girl of My Dreams by Hugh Whitemore)
- 1970: Der Minister und die Ente — (based on The Mallard Imaginaire / The Minister's Mallard by Alan Melville)
- 1971: Eine unwürdige Existenz
- 1971: Tatort: Kressin stoppt den Nordexpress (TV series episode) — (screenplay by Wolfgang Menge)
- 1971: Letzte Mahnung — (based on Final Demand by Hugh Whitemore)
- 1971: La Femme, le Mari et la Mort – Über die Schwierigkeiten, seinen Mann umzubringen — (based on the play Le Mari, la Femme et la Mort by André Roussin)
- 1971: Das Messer (TV miniseries) — (remake of Francis Durbridge's Tim Frazer: The Mellin Forrest Mystery, 1961)
- 1972–1973: Stadt ohne Sheriff (TV series, 26 episodes)
- 1972: Monsieur Chasse – Wie man Hasen jagt — (based on the play Monsieur Chasse by Georges Feydeau)
- 1973: Tapetenwechsel — (based on the play The Morning After by Peter Blackmore)
- 1973: Tatort: Kressin und die zwei Damen aus Jade (TV series episode)
- 1973: Tatort: Das fehlende Gewicht (TV series episode)
- 1974: Tatort: Playback oder die Show geht weiter (TV series episode)
- 1974: Du Land der Liebe
- 1975: Das ohnmächtige Pferd — (based on the play Le Cheval évanoui by Françoise Sagan)
- 1975: Tatort: Tod eines Einbrechers (TV series episode)
- 1975: 6 Zimmer Sonnenseite — (based on the play 6 Rms Riv Vu)
- 1977: Achsensprung
- 1977: Teerosen
- 1977: Des Doktors Dilemma — (based on the play The Doctor's Dilemma)
- 1977: Die Kette — (remake of Francis Durbridge's A Game of Murder, 1966)
- 1980: Leute wie du und ich (TV series, first episode)
- 1980: Aller guten Dinge sind drei (anthology film)
- 1980: Pygmalion — (based on the play Pygmalion)
- 1980: Tatort: Tote reisen nicht umsonst (TV series episode)
- 1980–1981: Liebe ist doof (TV series, 9 episodes) — (screenplay by Wolfgang Menge)
- 1980: Weekend — (based on the play Hay Fever)
- 1981: Ein Zug nach Manhattan — (based on Holiday Song by Paddy Chayefsky)
- 1981: Der Schützling — (based on a play by Ephraim Kishon)
- 1981: Ein sturer Bock
- 1981: Keine Angst vor Verwandten!
- 1982: Schuld sind nur die Frauen (co-director: Eugen York)
- 1982: Wohl bekomm's — (based on the play À vos souhaits by Pierre Chesnot)
- 1982: Und das zum 80. Geburtstag — (based on the play First Person Singular)
- 1982: Sonny Boys — (based on the play The Sunshine Boys)
- 1982: Eine etwas sonderbare Dame (co-director: Gero Erhardt) — (based on the play The Curious Savage)
- 1983: The Abduction of the Sabine Women — (based on a play by Franz von Schönthan and Paul von Schönthan)
- 1983: Roda Rodas rote Weste – Ein Leben in Anekdoten — (film about Alexander Roda Roda)
- 1984: Beautiful Wilhelmine (TV miniseries) — (based on the novel Die schöne Wilhelmine)
- 1984: Abgehört — (based on the play Overheard by Peter Ustinov)
- 1985: Der Schiedsrichter — (screenplay by Günter Kunert)
- 1985: Ich knüpfte manche zarte Bande (anthology film)
- 1985: Glücklich geschieden (TV series, 6 episodes)
- 1985: In Amt und Würden (anthology film)
- 1985: Tatort: Tod macht erfinderisch (TV series episode)
- 1986: Tatort: Die kleine Kanaille (TV series episode)
- 1987: Laus im Pelz — (based on the play The Nerd)
- 1987: Evelyn und die Männer
- 1987: Der Fälscher
- 1988: In guten Händen
- 1989: Zwei Münchner in Hamburg (TV series, 9 episodes)
- 1990: Kann ich noch ein bißchen bleiben?
- 1991: Altes Herz wird nochmal jung
- 1992: Wiedersehen in Kanada
- 1993: Weißblaue Geschichten (TV series, 2 episodes)
- 1994: Ein unvergessliches Wochenende in Südfrankreich (TV series episode)
- 1995: Rosamunde Pilcher: Karussell des Lebens — (based on Rosamunde Pilcher's novel The Carousel)
- 1995: Rosamunde Pilcher: Wechselspiel der Liebe — (based on Rosamunde Pilcher's novel Under Gemini)
- 1995: Rosamunde Pilcher: Schlafender Tiger — (based on Rosamunde Pilcher's novel Sleeping Tiger)
- 1995: Rosamunde Pilcher: Wolken am Horizont — (based on Rosamunde Pilcher's novel Voices in Summer)
- 1996: Rosamunde Pilcher: Schneesturm im Frühling — (based on Rosamunde Pilcher's novel Snow in April)
- 1997: Rosamunde Pilcher: Wind der Hoffnung — (based on Rosamunde Pilcher's story Toby)
- 1997: Heiß und kalt (TV miniseries) — (based on a novel by Petra Hammesfahr)
- 1997: Rosamunde Pilcher: Zwei Schwestern — (based on Rosamunde Pilcher's story Spanish Ladies)
- 1998: Rosamunde Pilcher: Der Preis der Liebe — (based on Rosamunde Pilcher's story An Evening to Remember)
- 1998: Männer sind was Wunderbares: Nicht ganz schwindelfrei (TV series episode)
- 1999: Rosamunde Pilcher: Magie der Liebe — (based on Rosamunde Pilcher's story The House on the Hill)
- 1999: Rosamunde Pilcher: Möwen im Wind — (based on Rosamunde Pilcher's story The White Birds)
- 2000: Rosamunde Pilcher: Ruf der Vergangenheit — (based on Rosamunde Pilcher's story Gilbert)
- 2001: Ein Stück vom Glück
- 2002: The Sisters' House — (based on a novel by Charlotte Link)
- 2002: Die Kristallprinzessin
- 2002: Rosamunde Pilcher: Morgen träumen wir gemeinsam — (based on Rosamunde Pilcher's story A Home for a Day II)

=== As actor ===
- 1980: The Green Bird (dir. István Szabó), as German Professor

=== as author ===
books

- Angst zu atmen. Ullstein Verlag, 1983, ISBN 3-550-06476-4.
- Der Regisseur. Ein autobiografisches Tagebuch. Rotation, Berlin 2011, ISBN 978-3-942972-01-7.
- Rückkehr der Zugvögel. Ein schicksalhaftes Klassentreffen. Frieling, Berlin 2012, ISBN 978-3-8280-3054-1.
- Ich werde mich nie verlieren. Aufzeichnungen eines Kriegsgefangenen. Frieling, Berlin 2013, ISBN 978-3-8280-3135-7.

audible books

- Angst zu atmen. Gelesen von Rolf von Sydow. Dölling und Galitz, Hamburg 2004, ISBN 3-937904-04-2.
- Rolf von Sydow erzählt aus seinem Leben: „Ich wollte von Hitler zum Ehrenarier ernannt werden.“ (Edition Zeugen einer Zeit). Paul Lazarus Stiftung, Wiesbaden 2011, ISBN 978-3-942902-02-1.
