= Late Love =

1943 film

- German film poster
- German: Späte Liebe
- Directed by: Gustav Ucicky
- Written by: Gerhard Menzel
- Produced by: Heinz-Joachim Ewert; Karl Hartl; Hans Somborn
- Starring: Paula Wessely; Attila Hörbiger; Inge List
- Cinematography: Hans Schneeberger
- Edited by: Rudolf Schaad
- Music by: Willy Schmidt-Gentner
- Production company: Wien Film
- Distributed by: Deutsche Filmvertriebs
- Release date: 16 February 1943
- Running time: 97 minutes
- Country: Germany
- Language: German

Late Love (German: Späte Liebe) is a 1943 German historical drama film directed by Gustav Ucicky and starring Paula Wessely, Attila Hörbiger and Inge List.

The film's sets were designed by the art director Werner Schlichting. It was shot at the Rosenhügel Studios in Vienna.

== Plot ==
The impoverished noblewoman Sophie von Angerspang has a big problem. Her younger sister Steffi is seriously ill with respiratory disease and therefore absolutely in need of a spa. Only the good mountain air in Davos, Switzerland could help, but unfortunately Sophie cannot afford such a stay because her job as a China painter pays too little. Therefore, she decides to marry the manufacturer August Polzer, who has been courting her for a long time. Sophie also doesn't hide the deeper reason why she accepts his proposal after all. Even under these circumstances, August is willing to marry Sophie because secretly he fervently hopes that a marriage of purpose and reason will eventually grow into a marriage of love.

The younger sister eventually marries a French man but gets seriously sick. Only after Sophie recognizes her husband's good heart, who travels to France and personally helps to care for Steffi, do Sophie and August find love together.

== Cast ==
- Paula Wessely as Sophie von Angerspang
- Attila Hörbiger as August Polzer
- Inge List as Steffi von Angerspang
- Fred Liewehr as von Pioletti
- Erik Frey as von Lammersbach
- Ferdinand Mayerhofer as Mr. Steininger
- Auguste Pünkösdy as Mrs. Steininger
- Klaramaria Skala as Betti Steininger
- Monique Joyce as Suzanne
- Eddy Ghilain as Maurice
- Gustav Waldau as Toni
- Karl Ehmann as accountant
- Rosl Dorena as cook
- Gertrude Prapscha as Monika
- Georges Chamarat as Arzt
- Franz Böheim
- Willy Rösner
- Paula Conrad
- Hertha Kraus
- Lola Hübner
- Fritz Puchstein
- Oskar Wegrostek
- Roger Dann
