= Elfie Mayerhofer =

Austrian actress and singer (1917–1992)

- Born: 15 March 1917; Maribor, Austro-Hungarian Empire
- Died: 28 December 1992 (aged 75); Maria Enzersdorf, Austria
- Occupations: Actress singer
- Years active: 1938–1968 (film)

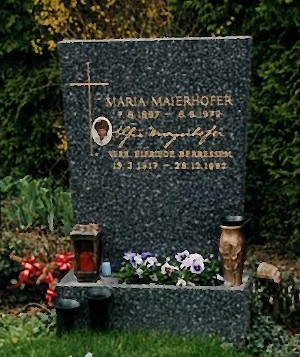
The grave of Elfie Mayerhofer

Elfie Mayerhofer (15 March 1917 – 28 December 1992) was an Austrian film actress and singer. A noted stage performer, she played lead roles in a series of musical and operetta films such as The Song of the Nightingale (1944) and The Heavenly Waltz (1949). She was known as the "Viennese Nightingale".

== Selected filmography ==
- Women for Golden Hill (1938)
- The Curtain Falls (1939)
- Hotel Sacher (1939)
- My Wife Theresa (1942)
- A Man With Principles? (1943)
- Music in Salzburg (1944)
- The Song of the Nightingale (1944)
- Viennese Melodies (1947)
- Anni (1948)
- The Court Concert (1948)
- The Heavenly Waltz (1948)
- Beloved Liar (1950)
- Kissing Is No Sin (1950)
- Vanished Melody (1952)
- Madame Pompadour (1960)

== Bibliography ==
- Fritsche, Maria. Homemade Men in Postwar Austrian Cinema: Nationhood, Genre and Masculinity. Berghahn Books, 2013.
- Goble, Alan. The Complete Index to Literary Sources in Film. Walter de Gruyter, 1999.
