= Robert Lindner =

Austrian actor

- Born: 19 June 1916; Vienna, Austro-Hungarian Empire
- Died: 6 June 1967 (aged 50); Vienna, Austria
- Occupation: Actor
- Years active: 1944–1966 (film & TV)

Robert Lindner (19 June 1916 – 6 June 1967) was an Austrian actor.

== Selected filmography ==
- Schrammeln (1944)
- The Other Life (1948)
- Third from the Right (1950)
- Vanished Melody (1952)
- Daughter of the Regiment (1953)
- Between Time and Eternity (1956)
- Man in the Shadows (1961)

== Bibliography ==
- Goble, Alan. The Complete Index to Literary Sources in Film. Walter de Gruyter, 1999.
