= Der tote Preuße =

Posthumous novel by Ernst von Salomon

- First edition
- Author: Ernst von Salomon
- Language: German
- Publisher: Langen Müller Verlag
- Publication date: 1973
- Publication place: West Germany
- Pages: 573
- ISBN: 9783784415376

Der tote Preuße ("the dead Prussian") is an unfinished novel by the German writer Ernst von Salomon, published posthumously in 1973. It has the subtitle Roman einer Staatsidee ("novel of a state idea"). The novel was supposed to be in three volumes and explain the concept of Prussia through an epic narrative. Salomon described the project as his "chief work"; however, he only wrote the first volume, which does not go beyond medieval times, and it was published in its unedited manuscript form. The book has a preface by Hans Lipinsky-Gottersdorf.

== Reception ==
Der Spiegel described the published material as the "ruins" of the conceived novel, and the content as a "history primer, in which lexicon, historical booklet and rough woodcut verdicts à la Werner Beumelburg amalgamate with double entendres ... and traces of old narrative art".
