= Adolf Gondrell =

German actor (1902–1954)

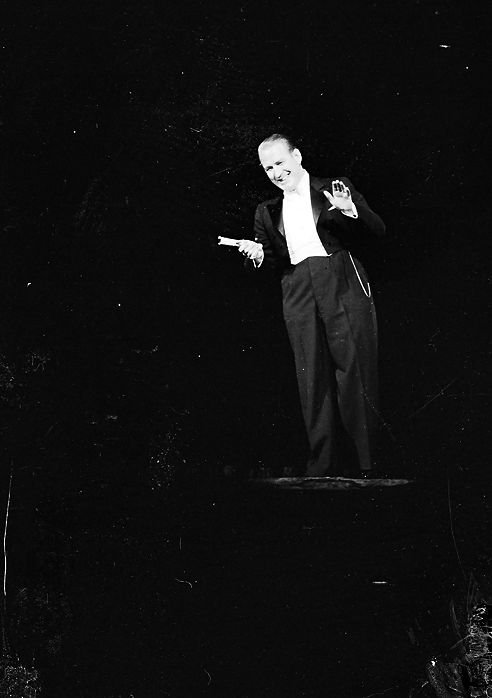
- Gondrell on stage in 1935
- Born: 1 July 1902; Munich, Bavaria, German Empire
- Died: 13 January 1954 (aged 51); Munich, Bavaria, West Germany
- Occupation: Actor
- Years active: 1919-1954 (film)

Adolf Gondrell (1902–1954) was a German stage and film actor known for his comedy roles. His name is also seen as Adolph Gondrell.

After working as master of ceremonies at the Simplizissimus cabaret in Munich, "he bought the cabaret Simpl in 1929 and soon became the most important master of ceremonies outside of Berlin."

== Selected filmography ==
- The Impossible Woman (1936)
- There Were Two Bachelors (1936)
- Under Blazing Heavens (1936)
- The Sinful Village (1940)
- Venus on Trial (1941)
- What Does Brigitte Want? (1941)
- The Little Residence (1942)
- The Endless Road (1943)
- The Song of the Nightingale (1944)
- The Millionaire (1947)
- Between Yesterday and Tomorrow (1947)
- Night of the Twelve (1949)
- Who Is This That I Love? (1950)
- Kissing Is No Sin (1950)
- Sensation in Savoy (1950)
- Good Fortune in Ohio (1950)
- The Last Shot (1951)
- Scandal at the Girls' School (1953)
- Love and Trumpets (1954)
