= Evelyn Künneke =

German singer and actress (1921–2001)

- Born: Eva-Susanne Künneke; 15 December 1921; Berlin, Germany
- Died: 28 April 2001 (aged 79); Berlin, Germany
- Occupations: Actress, Singer
- Years active: 1941–2001 (film)

Evelyn Künneke (15 December 1921 – 28 April 2001) was a German singer and stage, television and film actress. She was the daughter of the composer Eduard Künneke.

== Selected filmography ==
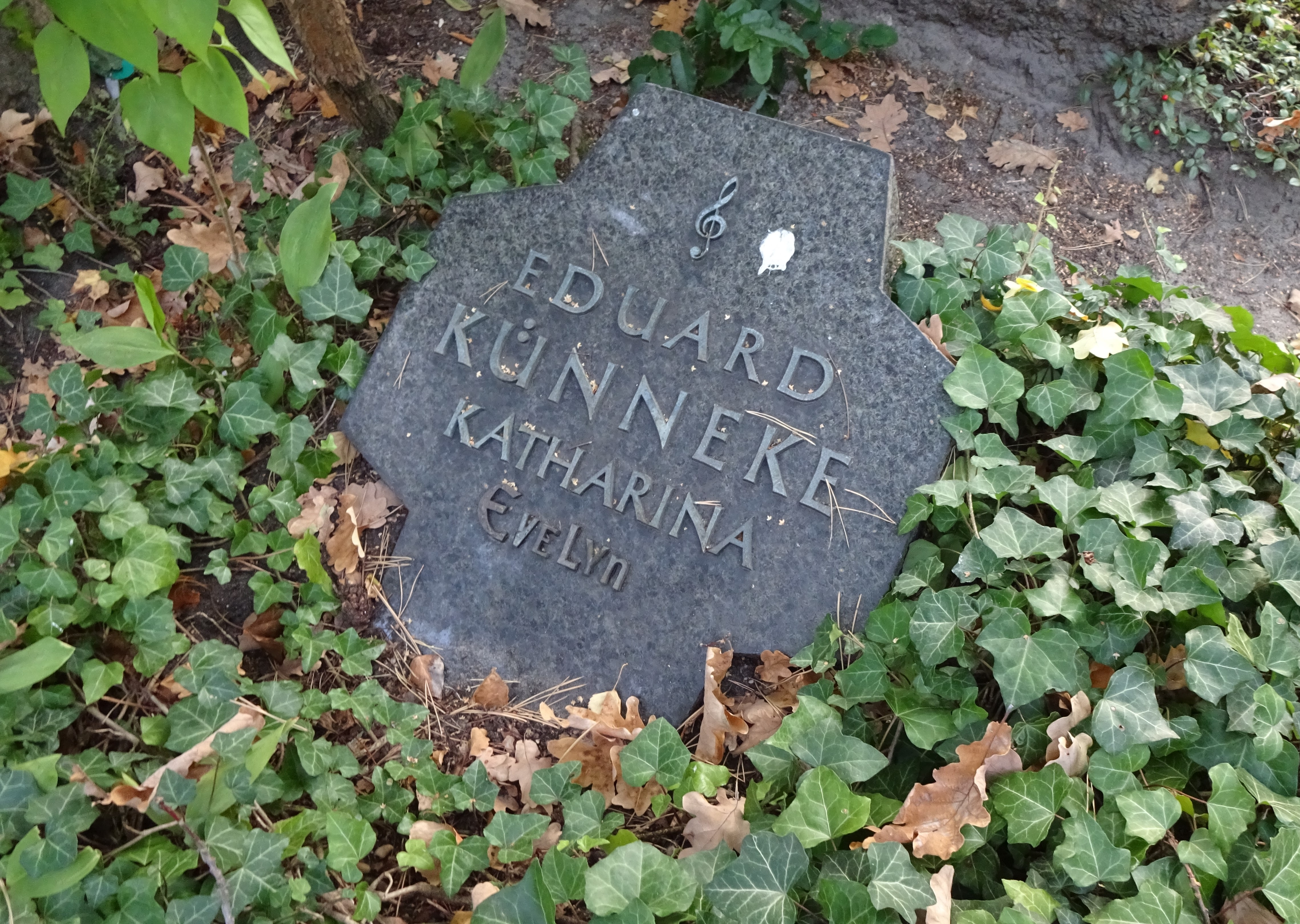
Grave of Evelyn with her father Eduard Künneke in Friedhof Heerstraße, Berlin-Westend

- Goodbye, Franziska (1941)
- Carnival of Love (1943)
- Third from the Right (1950)
- Maya of the Seven Veils (1951)
- Vanished Melody (1952)
- Dancing Stars (1952)
- The Big Star Parade (1954)
- I Was an Ugly Girl (1955)
- My Wife Makes Music (1958)
- I'd Like to Have My Troubles (1975)
- Flaming Hearts (1978)
- Just a Gigolo (1978)
- The Hamburg Syndrome (1979)
- Killer Condom (1996)

== Bibliography ==
- Huener, Jonathan; Nicosia, Francis R., eds. (2007) [2006]. The Arts in Nazi Germany: Continuity, Conformity, Change. New York: Berghahn Books. ISBN 978-1-84545-359-6.
