= Night of the Twelve =

1949 film

- Directed by: Hans Schweikart
- Written by: Fred Andreas; Paul May; Felicitas von Reznicek (novel)
- Produced by: Gerhard Staab
- Starring: Rudolf Fernau; Ferdinand Marian; Mady Rahl
- Cinematography: Franz Koch
- Edited by: Ludolf Grisebach; Werner Jacobs
- Music by: Norbert Schultze
- Production company: Bavaria Film
- Distributed by: Emka-Filmverleih
- Release date: 7 January 1949
- Running time: 92 minutes
- Country: Germany
- Language: German

Night of the Twelve (German: Die Nacht der Zwölf) is a 1949 German crime film directed by Hans Schweikart and starring Rudolf Fernau, Ferdinand Marian and Mady Rahl. It was made at the Bavaria Studios in Munich in 1945. It wasn't released before the end of the Second World War, and its eventual premiere took place in 1949. It was one of several crossover films from the Nazi era to debut during the Allied Occupation of Germany.

== Cast ==
- Rudolf Fernau as Rohrbach, Kriminalrat
- Ernst Karchow as Jost, Kriminalkommissar
- Kurt Müller-Graf as Heinze, Kriminalinspektor
- Ferdinand Marian as Leopold Lanski, Agent
- Elsa Wagner as Frau Siebel, Lanskis Wirtin
- Oskar Sima as Schliemann, Villenbesitzer
- Dagny Servaes as Frau von Droste
- Mady Rahl as Lily Kruse
- Alice Treff as Erika Petzold
- Annelies Reinhold as Frau Steffens
- Ellen Hille as Elfriede
- Adolf Gondrell
- Fritz Odemar
- Gerhard Bienert
- Nicolas Koline
- Alois Krüger
- Hildegard Flöricke
- Alexander Fischer-Marich
- Reinhold Pasch
- Arthur Wiesner
- Rudolf Stadler

== See also ==
- Überläufer

== Bibliography ==
- Davidson, John & Hake, Sabine. Framing the Fifties: Cinema in a Divided Germany. Berghahn Books, 2007.
