= Gerhard Ludwig =

German bookseller

Gerhard Ludwig (1909–1994) was a German bookseller.

== Early life ==
Born into a very poor working-class family in Berlin, his mother worked in an ammunitions factory, and his father was a beer deliverer and an alcoholic.

== Career ==
During the Third Reich he worked for the Frankfurter Zeitung, a newspaper which sheltered non-conformist writers.

He was imprisoned in Sachsenhausen between 1941 and 1945, for writing a cheeky post-card about pompous Nazi references to Frederick the Great. He was liberated by the Red Army on April 22, 1945, by which time he had developed severe tuberculosis.

In 1946, he received a 10,000 ℛ︁ℳ︁ credit and took over the bookshop in Cologne main station. Between 1950 and 1956, he illegally used the third-class waiting hall in the station for political and cultural discussion events ("Mittwochgespräche"), which were important for German education in democracy. Public figures faced a crowd and had to answer questions they would not know beforehand - something completely unknown in Germany before. The events stopped after 1956 when Cologne main station was re-designed. Among the invited guests were Heinrich Böll, Ernst von Salomon, Gustaf Gründgens, Werner Finck, and all members of Chancellor Konrad Adenauer's cabinet, with the sole exception of Adenauer himself.

He created the first shop for paperbacks. His shops were leased from the German Railway Authority (Deutsche Bundesbahn), and while he succeeded in cheating on the lease rates for many years, he was eventually found out and - under pressure from creditors - had to sell his shops in 1988.
