= Daughter of the Regiment (1953 film) =

Film based on the 1840 Donizetti opera

- German film poster
- German: Die Regimentstochter
- Directed by: Georg C. Klaren
- Written by: Margarete Göbel; Georg C. Klaren
- Produced by: J.A. Vesely
- Starring: Aglaja Schmid; Robert Lindner; Hermann Erhardt
- Cinematography: Willi Sohm
- Edited by: Josef Juvancic
- Music by: Karl Pauspertl
- Production company: Nova-Film
- Distributed by: Universal-Film
- Release date: September 1953
- Running time: 100 minutes
- Country: Austria
- Language: German

Daughter of the Regiment (German: Die Regimentstochter) is a 1953 Austrian historical comedy film directed by Georg C. Klaren and starring Aglaja Schmid, Robert Lindner, and Hermann Erhardt. It is based on the storyline of the 1840 opera La fille du regiment by Gaetano Donizetti. The plot had previously been used for a 1929 silent film and a 1933 sound film, and another film version was made during 1953 by Géza von Bolváry.

It was shot using Agfacolor at the Soviet-controlled Rosenhügel Studios in Vienna. The film's sets were designed by Leo Metzenbauer and Hans Zehetner.

== Plot ==
A Tyrolean rifle regiment adopt a young baby girl they have rescued and she becomes the "Daughter of the Regiment". In 1811, as a full-grown woman she falls in love with one of the new recruits while the regiment battles French forces during the Napoleonic Wars.

== Cast ==
- Aglaja Schmid as Marie
- Robert Lindner as Toni
- Hermann Erhardt as Sulpitz
- Dagny Servaes as Marquise
- Gusti Wolf as Annette
- Günther Haenel as Hortensio
- Elisabeth Markus as Herzogin
- Karl Fochler as Herzog
- Fritz Muliar as Hans
- Michael Janisch as Karl
- Anton Gaugl as Sepp
- Peter Klein as Anderl
- Auguste Welten
- Wiener Symphoniker as Play
