= Siegfried Breuer =

Austrian stage and film actor and occasional film director and screenwriter

- Born: 24 June 1906; Vienna, Austria-Hungary
- Died: 1 February 1954 (aged 47); Göttingen (Weende district), West Germany
- Years active: 1924 - 1953
- Spouse(s): Maria Andergast (1941 – ?), Eva Maria Meineke He was divorced six times.

Siegfried Breuer (24 June 1906 – 1 February 1954) was an Austrian stage and film actor and occasional film director and screenwriter.

== Biography ==

Born in Vienna, Siegried was the son of Hans Breuer (1868 or 1870–1929), who was an actor, operatic tenor, and opera director from Cologne. Performing was in the blood and he studied at the Academy of Music and Performing Arts in Vienna, some time in the early 1920s and made his stage debut at the Volkstheater, Vienna in 1924.

After some 15 years of stage acting he made his screen debut in a film called Eins zu Eins in 1939 where he went on to star in over 50 films between 1939 and 1954. In 1950 he directed, wrote and starred in the film Der Schuß durchs Fenster in which he worked with Curd Jürgens.

His son Siegfried Breuer Jr. and grandchildren Jacques Breuer and Pascal Breuer are also in the entertainment industry.

A heavy smoker, Breuer was married six times and died in 1954 in Weende, Göttingen at the age of 47.

== Filmography ==
- 1931: Wochenend im Paradies
- 1939: Immortal Waltz
- 1939: Linen from Ireland - Dr. Kuhn
- 1939: Anton the Last - Lawyer
- 1939: A Mother's Love - Kammersänger
- 1939: Eins zu Eins
- 1940: Nanette - 1. Schauspieler
- 1940: Der Postmeister - Rittmeister Minskij
- 1940: Vienna Tales - Egon von Brelowsky
- 1940: Operetta - Fürst Hohenburg
- The Way to Freedom (1941) - Graf Stefan Oginski
- 1941: Venus on Trial - Benjamin Hecht, Kunsthändler
- 1941: People in the Storm - Hauptmann Rakic
- 1942: Anuschka - Prof. Felix von Hartberg
- 1942: Sommerliebe - Baron von Worowsky
- 1943: Romance in a Minor Key - Viktor
- 1943: Gabriele Dambrone - Paul Madina
- 1943: Gefährlicher Frühling - Professor Alfred Lorenz
- 1944: Orient Express - Baron Erich Hübner
- 1944: Melusine - Stefan Brock
- 1945: Am Abend nach der Oper - Rudolph Manders
- 1945: Die tolle Susanne
- 1946: Die Fledermaus - Prinz Orlowsky
- 1947: The Immortal Face - Fürst Catti
- 1948: Alles Lüge - Berthold Plamershof
- 1948: The Other Life - Bukowsky
- 1948: Zyankali - Dr. Frank Morava
- 1948: Anni - Alexander Radkofsky
- 1948: Maresi - Tabakovitsch
- 1949: Fregola - Pablo Mendez
- 1949: Philine - Dr. Thomas Bratt, Lawyer
- 1949: Liebling der Welt - Harry Belmont
- 1949: The Third Man - Popescu
- 1950: Regimental Music
- 1949: Vagabonds - Andy Karr
- 1950: Bonus on Death - Peter Lissen, Versicherungsagent
- 1950: Der Schuß durchs Fenster (director)
- 1950: Gabriela - Thomas Lorenzen
- 1950: Seitensprünge im Schnee (director)
- 1951: Eine Frau mit Herz - Manfred Schilling
- 1951: Love and Blood - Il magistrato
- 1951: Shadows Over Naples - Der Präfekt
- 1951: Durch Dick und Dünn - Schulze
- 1951: Johannes und die 13 Schönheitsköniginnen - Oberst
- 1952: In München steht ein Hofbräuhaus (screenwriter)
- 1952: The Prince of Pappenheim - Juan Pablo de Gonzales
- 1952: You Only Live Once - Rollincourt
- 1952: When the Heath Dreams at Night - Konsul Berghaus
- 1952: We're Dancing on the Rainbow - Sophokles
- 1953: The Last Waltz - General Krasinski
- 1953: The Bird Seller - Marquis de Tréville
- 1953: Red Roses, Red Lips, Red Wine - Polizeipräfekt
- 1953: Under the Stars of Capri - Reeder Bramfeld (final film role)

== External links and sources ==
- Siegfried Breuer at IMDb
- Photographs and literature
