= Heinz Conrads =

Austrian actor, radio and television host and Wienerlied performer

- Born: 21 December 1913; Vienna, Austro-Hungarian Empire
- Died: 9 April 1986 (aged 72); Vienna, Austria
- Occupation: Actor
- Years active: 1947-1974 (film)

Heinz Conrads (December 21, 1913 – April 9, 1986) was an Austrian actor, radio and television host, and Wienerlied performer. He appeared in more than thirty films during his career including the 1947 historical It's Only Love.

== Selected filmography ==
- It's Only Love (1947)
- Spring on Ice (1951)
- Knall and Fall as Imposters (1952)
- Adventure in Vienna (1952)
- To Be Without Worries (1953)
- Grandstand for General Staff (1953)
- Love, Summer and Music (1956)
- And Who Is Kissing Me? (1956)
- Castle in Tyrol (1957)
- Wiener Schnitzel (1967)

== Bibliography ==
- Fritsche, Maria. Homemade Men in Postwar Austrian Cinema: Nationhood, Genre and Masculinity. Berghahn Books, 2013.
