= Per Schwenzen =

- Born: 3 February 1899; Moss, Norway
- Died: 4 November 1984 (aged 85); Munich, Bavaria; West Germany
- Occupation: Writer
- Years active: 1936–1972 (film)

Per Schwenzen (3 February 1899 – 4 November 1984) was a Norwegian writer who settled in Germany. Schwenzen wrote a number of screenplays, plays and librettos for operettas. His play In the Skies of Europe, advocating Franco-German reconciliation, was widely performed in 1933.

== Selected filmography ==
- Family Parade (1936)
- Back in the Country (1936)
- Autobus S (1937)
- Counterfeiters (1940)
- The Swedish Nightingale (1941)
- Gabriele Dambrone (1943)
- When the Young Wine Blossoms (1943)
- The Molander Case (1945)
- Professor Nachtfalter (1951)
- Captain Bay-Bay (1953)
- Jonny Saves Nebrador (1953)
- Men at a Dangerous Age (1954)
- Ten on Every Finger (1954)
- Guitars of Love (1954)
- As Long as There Are Pretty Girls (1955)
- The Major and the Bulls (1955)
- I Often Think of Piroschka (1955)
- The Mad Bomberg (1957)
- A Woman Who Knows What She Wants (1958)
- The Blue Sea and You (1959)
- Everybody Loves Peter (1959)
- Hula-Hopp, Conny (1959)
- Heritage of Bjorndal (1960)
- The Cry of the Wild Geese (1961)
- The Sky Is Blue (1964, TV film)
