= The Dark Day =

1943 film directed by Géza von Bolváry

- Directed by: Géza von Bolváry
- Written by: Wolf Neumeister; Ilse M. Spath; Ernst von Salomon
- Produced by: Ottmar Ostermayr
- Starring: Marte Harell; Willy Birgel; Ewald Balser
- Cinematography: Erich Claunigk
- Edited by: Gottlieb Madl
- Music by: Leo Leux
- Production company: Bavaria Film
- Distributed by: Deutsche Filmvertriebs
- Release date: 10 February 1943
- Running time: 83 minutes
- Country: Germany
- Language: German

The Dark Day (German: Der dunkle Tag) is a 1943 German drama film directed by Géza von Bolváry and starring Marte Harell, Willy Birgel and Ewald Balser. It was shot at the Bavaria Studios in Munich. The film's sets were designed by the art directors Rudolf Pfenninger and Ludwig Reiber.

== Cast ==
- Marte Harell as Georgia Pauly, geb.Engelbrecht
- Willy Birgel as Martin Pauly, Oberstaatsanwalt
- Ewald Balser as Wolf Burkhardt
- Malte Jaeger as Dieter von Weymar, Gutsbesitzer
- Josef Eichheim as Kleinschmidt, Buchhalter bei Troß
- Roma Bahn as Henriette Waizenegger
- Gabriele Reismüller as Marie-Luise von Weymar, seine Schwester
- Walter Steinbeck as Troß, Makler und Agent
- Hans Zesch-Ballot as Dr. Fabricius, Staatsanwalt
- Fritz Reiff as Bankier Engelbrecht, Georgias Vater
- Karl-Heinz Peters as Hirzinger, Jagdaufseher
- Arnulf Schröder as Feller, Kriminalkommissar

== Bibliography ==
- Klaus, Ulrich J. Deutsche Tonfilme: Jahrgang 1942. Klaus-Archiv, 1988.
- Wistrich, Robert S. Who's Who in Nazi Germany. Taylor & Francis, 2013.
