= Franz Böheim =

Austrian actor (1909–1963)

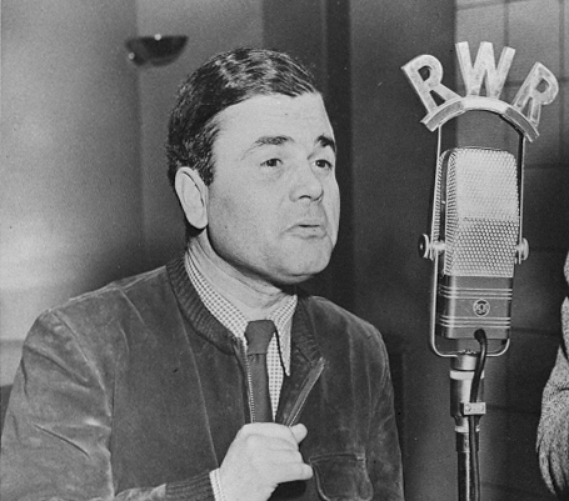
- Franz Böheim (1952)
- Born: 24 June 1909; Vienna, Austro-Hungarian Empire
- Died: March 24, 1963 (aged 53); Vienna, Austria
- Occupation: Actor
- Years active: 1936-1963 (film)

Franz Böheim (June 24, 1909 – March 24, 1963) was an Austrian film actor. Böheim appeared in more than fifty films and television series, including the 1947 film It's Only Love in which he played Franz Schubert. He was the brother of the actors Carlo Böhm and Alfred Böhm.

== Selected filmography ==
- Anton the Last (1939)
- Immortal Waltz (1939)
- Beloved Augustin (1940)
- Thrice Wed (1941)
- Late Love (1943)
- The Heart Must Be Silent (1944)
- Die Fledermaus (1946)
- It's Only Love (1947)
- The Heavenly Waltz (1948)
- Adventure in Vienna (1952)
- Arena of Death (1953)
- Grandstand for General Staff (1953)
- Marriage Sanitarium (1955)
- Mozart (1955)
- The Blue Danube (1955)
- And Who Is Kissing Me? (1956)

== Bibliography ==
- Mitchell, Charles P. The Great Composers Portrayed on Film, 1913 Through 2002. McFarland & Company, 2004.
