= Venus on Trial =

1941 film directed by Hans H. Zerlett

- Directed by: Hans H. Zerlett
- Written by: Hans H. Zerlett
- Produced by: Ottmar Ostermayr
- Starring: Hannes Stelzer; Hansi Knoteck; Paul Dahlke; Siegfried Breuer
- Cinematography: Oskar Schnirch
- Edited by: Gottlieb Madl
- Music by: Leo Leux
- Production company: Bavaria Film
- Distributed by: Bavaria Film
- Release date: 4 June 1941
- Running time: 90 minutes
- Country: Germany
- Language: German

Venus on Trial (German: Venus vor Gericht) is a 1941 German drama film directed by Hans H. Zerlett and starring Hannes Stelzer, Hansi Knoteck, and Paul Dahlke. The film was part of the Nazis' campaign against 'degenerate art', and depicts the trial of a young artist who has resisted the trend towards it.

The film was made by Bavaria Film at their Emelka Studios in Munich. The film's sets were designed by the art directors Max Seefelder, Hans Sohnle and Wilhelm Vorwerg.

== Plot ==
The film is set in the 1920s. Peter Brake, a sculptor, believes modern art to be decadent. He creates a neoclassical-style statue of Venus, which he then buries in a Bavarian field in order to protect the identity of Charlotte, the woman who modelled for it. When it is dug up, experts believe that Venus vom Acker ('Venus of the Fields') is an ancient statue made by Praxiteles.

Peter is unable to prove that he is the creator of the statue, as the only person able to verify his claim is the model. He tries to keep her out of the matter, as she is now a respectable housewife. Ultimately, however, she decides to come forward as a witness.

== Cast ==
- Hannes Stelzer as Peter Brake, Bildhauer
- Hansi Knoteck as Charlotte Böller
- Paul Dahlke as Gottlieb Böller, Bürgermeister
- Siegfried Breuer as Benjamin Hecht, Kunsthändler
- Charlott Daudert as Marianne
- Ernst Fritz Fürbringer as Paul Dreysing, Zeichner
- Josef Eichheim as Prof. Semmel, Bildhauer
- Erhard Siedel as Der Kultusminister
- Carl Wery as Senior Prosecutor
- Hans Brausewetter as Prosecutor
- Hubert von Meyerinck as Dr.Knarre, Sachverständiger
- Justus Paris as Prof. Grimm, Sachverständiger
- Fritz Reiff as Judge
- Peter Elsholtz as Defense lawyer
- Adolf Gondrell as Bronsky, Agent
- Albert Hörrmann as Dr. Wertheimer, Referent des Kultusministers
- Peter Pasetti as Parteigenosse
- Liesl Karlstadt as Hausmädchen
- Fritz Hoopts as Brinkmann, Gerichtsvollzieher
- Eva Tinschmann as Rita, Empfangsdame
- Martin Urtel as Werner, Peters Freund
- Carl Ballhaus as Alfred, Peters Freund
- Heini Handschumacher as Reporter
- Rudolf Vogel as Dr. Gerhard Hümmelmann
- Heinrich Hauser as Obersturmbannführer Lotze
- Gabriele Reismüller as Sekretärin
- Charles Willy Kayser
- Walter Lantzsch
- Kurt Stieler

== Role as propaganda ==
The character of Peter Brake may be loosely based on Arno Breker, whose work was endorsed by the Nazi authorities.

The filmmakers used sculptures that had been seized by the government, including Ernst Kirchner's Das Paar ('The Couple'), Otto Freundlich's Kopf (Head), and Marg Moll's Tanzerin (Dancer), as props.

The art experts who misidentify Brake's sculpture are all coded as effete, homosexual or Jewish, etc. Susan Felleman suggests that the film's attempt at propaganda were weak, finding that its portrayals of a 'decadent' Berlin nightlife and the character of Benjamin Hecht (a Jewish art dealer) significantly more interesting than those Brake and his circle.

== Bibliography ==
- Hake, Sabine (2001). Popular Cinema of the Third Reich. Austin: University of Texas Press. ISBN 978-0-292-73458-6.
