= Regimental Music =

1950 film directed by Arthur Maria Rabenalt

- Directed by: Arthur Maria Rabenalt
- Written by: Peter Francke
- Based on: Die Schuld der Gabriele Rottweil by Hans Gustl Kernmayr
- Produced by: Ottmar Ostermayr
- Starring: Heidemarie Hatheyer; Friedrich Domin; Siegfried Breuer
- Cinematography: Franz Koch
- Edited by: Gertrud Hinz-Nischwitz
- Music by: Lothar Brühne
- Production company: Bavaria Film
- Distributed by: Ring-Film; Sascha Film (Austria)
- Release date: 1 September 1950
- Running time: 79 minutes
- Country: West Germany
- Language: German

Regimental Music (German: Regimentsmusik) is a 1950 German drama film directed by Arthur Maria Rabenalt and starring Heidemarie Hatheyer, Friedrich Domin and Siegfried Breuer. It was an Überläufer, a film made predominantly during the Second World War but not released until after the fall of the Nazi regime. It was based on the novel Die Schuld der Gabriele Rottweil by Hans Gustl Kernmayr and it sometimes known by this title. It was shot at the Bavaria Studios in Munich. The film's sets were designed by the art directors Rudolf Pfenninger and Ludwig Reiber. The film's direction was originally assigned to Georg Wilhelm Pabst before he was replaced by Rabenalt.

== Cast ==
- Heidemarie Hatheyer as Gabriele von Wahl
- Friedrich Domin as Herr von Wahl
- Siegfried Breuer as Dr. Robert Rottweil
- Kurt Müller-Graf as Leutnant Rainer von Teschenbach
- Gustav Waldau as Onkel Max
- Anton Pointner as Heinrich von Stammer
- Gabriele Reismüller as Gusti Dankl
- Heini Handschumacher as Rudi von Geldern
- Emil Matousek as Hugo
- Walter Holten as Oberst Weippert
- Marie Griebel as Haushälterin Veronika
- Walther Jung as Oberstabsarzt Dr. Wegener
- Sepp Nigg as Post bringender Soldat
- Fritz Reiff as Hausarzt bei Wahl
- Karl Schaidler as Post verteilender Soldat Fischer
- Paul Wagner as Kriegsgerichtsrat Westermann
- Beppo Brem as Soldat mit Rumbecher
- Rosemarie Grosser as Gustis Freundin Resi
- Joseph Offenbach as Assistenzarzt

== Bibliography ==
- Eckart, Wolfgang Uwe. Medizin im Spielfilm des Nationalsozialismus. Burgverlag, 1990.
- Goble, Alan. The Complete Index to Literary Sources in Film. Walter de Gruyter, 1999.
- Rentschler, Eric. The Ministry of Illusion: Nazi Cinema and Its Afterlife. Harvard University Press, 1996.
