= Charlott Daudert =

German actress

- Born: 27 December 1913; Königsberg, East Prussia, German Empire
- Died: 19 January 1961 (aged 47); Monte Carlo, Monaco
- Occupation: Actor
- Years active: 1933–1961

Charlott Daudert (27 December 1913 – 19 January 1961) was a German film actress.

== Filmography ==
- The Csardas Princess (1934)
- Frasquita (1934)
- Da stimmt was nicht (1934)
- Old Comrades (1934)
- April, April! (1935)
- Die klugen Frauen (1936)
- The Bashful Casanova (1936)
- Angels with Minor Faults (1936)
- Crooks in Tails(1937)
- Der Etappenhase (1937)
- Don't Promise Me Anything (1937)
- Diamonds (1937)
- The Man Who Couldn't Say No (1938)
- Heimat (1938)
- Das Ehesanatorium (1938)
- Love Letters from the Engadine (1938)
- Shoulder Arms (1939)
- Her First Experience (1939)
- The Fourth Is Not Coming (1939)
- Die kluge Schwiegermutter (1939)
- Kitty and the World Conference (1939)
- Men Are That Way (1939)
- We Danced Around the World (1939)
- Midsummer Night's Fire (1939)
- Seitensprünge (1940)
- Liebesschule (1940)
- Die letzte Runde (1940)
- My Daughter Lives in Vienna (1940)
- Venus on Trial (1941)
- Charivan (1941)
- Wenn du noch eine Heimat hast (1942)
- Der Hochtourist (1942)
- The Big Number (1943)
- The Crew of the Dora (1943)
- Love Premiere (1943)
- A Salzburg Comedy (1943)
- Two Happy People (1943)
- Ich habe von dir geträumt (1944)
- Come Back to Me (1944)
- The Man in the Saddle (1945)
- Insolent and in Love (1948)
- Beloved Liar (1950)
- Theodore the Goalkeeper (1950)
- Wedding with Erika (1950)
- Nacht ohne Sünde (1950)
- Land der Sehnsucht (1950)
- Drei Kavaliere (1951)
- The Blue Star of the South (1951)
- Oh, You Dear Fridolin (1952)
- Klettermaxe (1952)
- Knall and Fall as Detectives (1952)
- Father Needs a Wife (1952)
- Heute nacht passiert's (1953)
- Don't Forget Love (1953)
- Fräulein Casanova (1953)
- Conchita and the Engineer (1954)
- The Hunter's Cross (1954)
- The Crazy Clinic (1954)
- Dein Mund verspricht mir Liebe (1954)
- The Happy Village (1955)
- Melody of the Heath (1956)
- Uns gefällt die Welt (1956)
- Die Schönste (1957)
- For Love and Others (1959)

== Bibliography ==
- Wolfgang Jacobsen & Hans Helmut Prinzler. Käutner. Spiess, 1992.
