= It's Only Love (film) =

- Directed by: Emmerich Hanus
- Written by: Julius Brandt; Walter Gynt; Benno A. Haas; Emmerich Hanus
- Produced by: Emmerich Hanus
- Starring: Franz Böheim; Klaramaria Skala; Walter Gynt; Heinz Conrads
- Cinematography: Willi Sohm
- Music by: Oskar Wagner
- Production company: Royal Film
- Distributed by: Star Film
- Release date: 18 November 1947
- Country: Austria
- Language: German

It's Only Love (German: Seine einzige Liebe) is a 1947 Austrian historical musical film directed by Emmerich Hanus and starring Franz Böheim, Klaramaria Skala and Walter Gynt. The film portrays the life of the composer Franz Schubert.

== Cast ==
- Franz Böheim as Franz Schubert
- Klaramaria Skala as Therese Grob
- Walter Gynt as Vater Grob
- Heinz Conrads as Schober
- Rudolf Kreitner as Schwind
- Julius Brandt as Diabelli
- Leopold Reiter as Vogl
- Teddy Kern
- Charles Kalwoda
- Pepi Glöckner-Kramer
- Jenny Liese as Mutter Grob
- Martha Lukas as Kathi Fröhlich
- Erika Meisels
- Evi Servaes as Annerl
- Helli Servi as Maria
