= Der Schuß durchs Fenster =

- Directed by: Siegfried Breuer
- Written by: Siegfried Breuer, Rolf Olsen
- Cinematography: Helmut Ashley
- Edited by: Karl Aulitzky
- Music by: Willy Schmidt-Gentner
- Production company: Alpen-Film Austria AFA (Graz)
- Release date: 1950
- Running time: 96 minutes
- Country: Austria
- Language: German

Der Schuß durchs Fenster is a 1950 Austrian drama film directed by Siegfried Breuer, who also co-wrote the screenplay with Rolf Olsen and appears in the film. It stars Curd Jürgens as Dr. Winkler, alongside Breuer, Edith Mill, Gunther Philipp, and Eva Leiter.

The film was produced by Alpen-Film Austria and shot in 1949 in Graz and its surroundings, including Thalerhof, as well as at the company’s studios. It premiered in Germany in January 1950 and in Austria in March 1950.

== Cast ==
- Curd Jürgens as Dr. Winkler
- Siegfried Breuer as Kriminalkommissar Rittner
- Gunther Philipp as Kriminalassistent Jelinek
- Edith Mill as Maria Vogt
- Eva Leiter as Grit Sorell
- Hans Putz as Chauffeur Strinzel
- Fritz Eckhardt (role not specified)
