= Fred Andreas =

German novelist and screenwriter

- Born: 3 February 1898; Halle, German Empire
- Died: 6 March 1975 (aged 77); Munich, Bavaria, West Germany
- Occupations: Screenwriter, novelist

Fred Andreas (1898–1975) was a German novelist, journalist and screenwriter. A number of films are based on novels of his including the 1934 production A Man Wants to Get to Germany.

== Selected filmography ==
- The Schorrsiegel Affair (1928)
- A Man Wants to Get to Germany (1934)
- One Too Many on Board (1935)
- If It Were Not for Music (1935)
- Love's Awakening (1936)
- The Yellow Flag (1937)
- Love Can Lie (1937)
- Nights in Andalusia (1938)
- Insolent and in Love (1948)
- Law of Love (1949)
- Night of the Twelve (1949)
- Der Teufel führt Regie (1951)

== Bibliography ==
- Giesen, Rolf. Nazi Propaganda Films: A History and Filmography. McFarland, 2003.
- Goble, Alan. The Complete Index to Literary Sources in Film. Walter de Gruyter, 1999.
- Waldman, Harry. Nazi Films in America, 1933–1942. McFarland, 2008.
