= In the Name of the King (1924 film) =

1924 film directed by Erich Schönfelder

- Directed by: Erich Schönfelder
- Written by: Willy Haas; Arthur Rosen
- Starring: Dagny Servaes; Walter Rilla; Magda Unger
- Cinematography: Curt Helling; Karl Puth
- Production company: Europäische Lichtbild
- Release date: January 1924
- Country: Germany
- Languages: Silent; German intertitles

In the Name of the King (German: Im Namen des Königs) is a 1924 German silent film directed by Erich Schönfelder and starring Dagny Servaes, Walter Rilla and Magda Unger.

The film's sets were designed by the art director Fritz Lederer.

== Cast ==
- Dagny Servaes
- Walter Rilla
- Magda Unger
- Julius Falkenstein
- Elisabeth Lennartz
- Adi Gröger
- Heinz Stieda

== Bibliography ==
- Bock, Hans-Michael & Bergfelder, Tim. The Concise CineGraph. Encyclopedia of German Cinema. Berghahn Books, 2009.
