= The Gardener of God =

2011 Italian film by Liana Marabini

- Directed by: Liana Marabini
- Screenplay by: Liana Marabini
- Based on: The life of Gregor Mendel
- Produced by: Liana Marabini
- Starring: Christopher Lambert; David Wayne Callahan; Steven Cree; Daniela Di Muro; Anja Kruse; Emma Lo Bianco; Marco Miraglia; Jay Natelle; Michele Natelle; Maria Pia Ruspoli; Jacopo Venturiero
- Edited by: László Rumbold
- Production company: Condor Pictures
- Distributed by: Alberto Bitelli Intl. Films
- Release date: 11 July 2011
- Running time: 110 minutes
- Country: Italy
- Language: Italian

The Gardener of God is a 2011 Italian drama film written and directed by Liana Marabini, about the life and works of Gregor Mendel, a Catholic priest who lived in the Austro-Hungarian Empire. The main role is played by Christopher Lambert.

== Plot ==
The film shows the life and works of Gregor Mendel, the father of modern genetics, from the perspective of a scientific monk, a man of prayer, faith and science. The decor is the 19th century Austro-Hungarian Empire. We see Mendel's fight to change the fiscal policies applied to the monasteries of his country, as well as his struggles to change people's mind regarding his great discovery. Mendel will ask himself if it is possible to reconcile faith and science, and if his discovery will be useful for humanity or dangerous, as it could be used for eugenics purposes. In that sense, his benefactor and friend, the princess Hanna von Limburg, will be of a great help. Mendel finally publishes his conclusions, and goes to the Vatican meet the Pope, who welcomes his works.

== Cast ==
- Christopher Lambert as Gregor Mendel
- David Wayne Callahan as Marquis Giovanni Sala Amorini
- Steven Cree as The Rabbi
- Daniela Di Muro as Federica Salina Amorini
- Anja Kruse as Erica von Baumann
- Emma Lo Bianco as Arielle
- Marco Miraglia as Duel Witness
- Jay Natelle as Prince Benedikt
- Michele Natelle as Benedikt
- Maria Pia Ruspoli as Hanna von Limburg
- Jacopo Venturiero
