= Anni (1948 film) =

1948 film directed by Max Neufeld

- German film poster
- Directed by: Max Neufeld
- Written by: Harald Röbbeling; Max Neufeld
- Produced by: Heinrich Haas
- Starring: Elfie Mayerhofer; Siegfried Breuer; Josef Meinrad; Elisabeth Markus
- Cinematography: Walter Riml
- Music by: Alois Melichar
- Production company: Styria-Berna-Film
- Distributed by: Schorcht Filmverleih
- Release date: 4 June 1948
- Running time: 93 minutes
- Countries: Austria; Germany
- Language: German

Anni is a 1948 Austrian-German historical romance film directed by Max Neufeld and starring Elfie Mayerhofer, Siegfried Breuer and Josef Meinrad. It is part of the genre of Vienna films.

The film was shot at the Rosenhügel Studios in Vienna with sets designed by the art director Fritz Jüptner-Jonstorff.

== Cast ==
- Elfie Mayerhofer as Anni Huber
- Siegfried Breuer as Alexander Radkofsky
- Josef Meinrad as Heinrich Buchgraber
- Elisabeth Markus as Fürstin Paula v. Metternich
- Annie Rosar as Frau Sacher
- Lotte Neumayer as Tante Ernestine
- Willy Danek as Bergauer
- Alexander Fischer-Marich as Antiquitätenhändler
- Pepi Glöckner-Kramer as Frau Hofer, Wirtin Radkofskys
- Theodor Grieg as Vater Huber
- Gisela Horn as Frau Radkofsky
- Hilde Jaeger as Mutter Huber
- Eduard Kautzner as Kellner im Hotel Sacher
- Hanns Kurth as Bösendorfer
- Mimi Mischka-Marik as Paula
- Eugen Neufeld as Direktor Jahn
- Eugen Preiß as Franz Liszt
