= Dr. Hart's Diary =

1917 film

- Directed by: Paul Leni
- Written by: Hans Brenner
- Produced by: Paul Davidson
- Starring: Heinrich Schroth; Käthe Haack; Dagny Servaes; Ernst Hofmann
- Cinematography: Carl Hoffmann
- Production company: PAGU
- Distributed by: PAGU
- Release date: 1917
- Running time: 82 minutes
- Country: Germany
- Languages: Silent; German intertitles

Dr. Hart's Diary (German: Das Tagebuch des Dr. Hart) is a 1917 German silent war film directed by Paul Leni and starring Heinrich Schroth, Käthe Haack and Dagny Servaes. The film depicts a German field hospital in occupied Russian Poland during the ongoing First World War.

The film was created as part of a major effort to propagandize the German-Polish friendship that leads to the re-establishment of Poland by German forces in late 1916. It was produced by Paul Davidson's PAGU in association with the propaganda agency BUFA. Shortly afterwards, hoping to produce a number of similar films, the German government founded UFA which PAGU merged into.

== Cast ==
- Heinrich Schroth as Dr. Robert Hart
- Käthe Haack as Schlossherrin Ursula von Hohenau
- Dagny Servaes as Jadwiga Bransky
- Ernst Hofmann as Graf Bronislaw Krascinsky
- Adolf Klein as Graf Bransky

== Preservation ==
A 35 mm print of the film is held by George Eastman House.

== Bibliography ==
- Prawer, S.S. Between Two Worlds: The Jewish Presence in German and Austrian Film, 1910-1933. Berghahn Books, 2005.
