= Law of Love =

1949 film

- Directed by: Hans Schweikart
- Written by: Ernst von Salomon
- Based on: Das Gesetz der Liebe by Fred Andreas
- Produced by: Gerhard Staab
- Starring: Hilde Krahl; Paul Hubschmid; Ferdinand Marian
- Cinematography: Bruno Stephan
- Edited by: Ludolf Grisebach
- Music by: Oskar Wagner
- Production company: Bavaria Film
- Distributed by: Union-Film
- Release date: 30 December 1949
- Running time: 96 minutes
- Country: West Germany
- Language: German

Law of Love (German: Das Gesetz der Liebe) is a 1949 German historical drama film directed by Hans Schweikart and starring Hilde Krahl, Paul Hubschmid and Ferdinand Marian. Production began in 1944 during the Nazi era and was completed by 1945, but the end of the Second World War led to delays in its distribution as also occurred with several other productions. It was not released for a further four years until its premiere in Erlangen, Bavaria in the newly established West Germany. Its West Berlin premiere took place in May 1950.

The film was based on a 1936 novel of the same title by Fred Andreas. It was shot at the Bavaria Studios in Munich and at the Hostivar Studios in German-occupied Prague. The film's sets were designed by the art director Hans Sohnle.

== Cast ==
- Hilde Krahl as Madeleine Frisius
- Paul Hubschmid as Premierleutnant Hofstede
- Ferdinand Marian as Baron Pistolecrone
- Hilde Hildebrand as Signora Rinuccini
- Fritz Odemar as Martin - Diener bei Pistolecrone
- Paul Dahlke as Leutnant von Gorschewski
- Ida Wüst as Madame Templin
- Willy Danek as Leutnant von Schölger
- Ilse Fürstenberg as Frau Aktuarius Ketteler
- Hans Paetsch as Junker Graf Oynhausen
- Walther Jung as General von Massenbach
- Viktor Afritsch as Französischer Gesandter
- Victor Janson as Sanferini
- Angelo Ferrari as von Roussillion, Operndirektor

== Bibliography ==
- Bock, Hans-Michael & Bergfelder, Tim. The Concise Cinegraph: Encyclopaedia of German Cinema. Berghahn Books, 2009.
- Rentschler, Eric. The Ministry of Illusion: Nazi Cinema and Its Afterlife. Harvard University Press, 1996.
