= Gabriele Reismüller =

German actress

- Born: 30 November 1920; Degerndorf, Germany
- Died: 24 November 1969 (aged 48); Munich, West Germany
- Occupation: Actress
- Years active: 1941–1969

Gabriele Reismüller (30 November 1920 – 24 November 1969) was a German actress. She appeared in twenty-seven films between 1941 and 1969.

== Selected filmography ==
- Venus on Trial (1941)
- The Dark Day (1943)
- The Millionaire (1947)
- Insolent and in Love (1948)
- Regimental Music (1950)
- Marriage Strike (1953)
- Gustav Adolf's Page (1960)
