= The Outlaws (novel) =

1930 novel by Ernst von Salomon

- Second edition (1933)
- Author: Ernst von Salomon
- Original title: Die Geächteten
- Translator: Ian F. D. Morrow
- Language: German
- Publisher: Rowohlt Verlag
- Publication date: 1930
- Publication place: Germany
- English publication date: 1931
- Pages: 483

The Outlaws is a 1930 novel by the German writer Ernst von Salomon. Its German title is Die Geächteten, which means "the ostracised". Set between 1919 and 1922, the narrative is based on Salomon's experiences from the Freikorps, and includes an account of the 1922 assassination of foreign minister Walther Rathenau, in which the then 19-year-old Salomon was peripherically involved. The Outlaws was Salomon's debut novel. It was published in English in 1931, translated by Ian F. D. Morrow.

The novel was a commercial success. It was followed by two sequels, It Cannot Be Stormed from 1932 and Die Kadetten/The Cadets from 1933.

== Reception ==
André Levinson of Je suis partout, republished in English in The Living Age in 1932, wrote about The Outlaws: "It is sinister and obscure, an infamous epic of the last phase of the German Waterloo, the Black Terror. ... The doctrine proclaimed in Ernst von Salomon's story is a familiar one. It proclaims the preeminence of honor over justice."
