= If We All Were Angels (1956 film) =

1956 film

- Directed by: Günther Lüders
- Written by: Heinrich Spoerl (novel); Kurt Nachmann
- Produced by: Georg Richter
- Starring: Dieter Borsche; Marianne Koch; Hans Söhnker
- Cinematography: Günther Rittau
- Edited by: Anneliese Schönnenbeck
- Music by: Franz Grothe
- Production company: Bavaria Film
- Distributed by: Schorcht Filmverleih
- Release date: 21 September 1956
- Running time: 88 minutes
- Country: West Germany
- Language: German

If We All Were Angels (German: Wenn wir alle Engel wären) is a 1956 West German comedy film directed by Günther Lüders and starring Dieter Borsche, Marianne Koch and Hans Söhnker. It is a remake of the 1936 film If We All Were Angels.

== Cast ==
- Dieter Borsche as Christian Kempenich
- Marianne Koch as Elisabeth Kempenich
- Hans Söhnker as Enrico Farlotti
- Carla Hagen as Marie
- Fita Benkhoff as Selma
- Gustav Knuth as Kommissar
- Erich Ponto as Amtsrichter
- Ingrid Pan as Fräulein Knüll
- Edith Hancke as Junge Animierdame
- Elisabeth Lennartz as Frau Schimmelpfennig
- Ellinor Lang
- Albert Florath as Justizrat Genius
- Joachim Teege as Amtsanwalt
- Rudolf Therkatz as Bürgermeister
- Walter Gross as Robert
- Willy Maertens as Jörges
- Adolf Dell as Bürgermeister

== Bibliography ==
- Williams, Alan. Film and Nationalism. Rutgers University Press, 2002.
