= A Heart Beats for You =

1949 film

- German: Ein Herz schlägt für dich
- Directed by: Joe Stöckel
- Written by: Wilhelmine von Hillern (novel); Alois Johannes Lippl
- Produced by: Oskar Marion
- Starring: Rudolf Prack; Annelies Reinhold; Franz Loskarn
- Cinematography: Heinz Schnackertz
- Edited by: Gottlieb Madl
- Music by: Oskar Wagner
- Production company: Bavaria Film
- Distributed by: Schorcht Filmverleih
- Release date: 12 April 1949
- Running time: 79 minutes
- Country: Germany
- Language: German

A Heart Beats for You (German: Ein Herz schlägt für dich) is a 1949 German romance film directed by Joe Stöckel and starring Rudolf Prack, Annelies Reinhold and Franz Loskarn.

The film was shot in 1944, and was due for release in 1945 but did not premiere before the end of the war. Like several other Nazi-era films it was given a delayed release.

It was made at the Bavaria Studios in Munich. The film's sets were designed by the art director Kurt Dürnhöfer and Max Seefelder.

== Cast ==
- Rudolf Prack as Martin Hellwanger, Bauer
- Annelies Reinhold as Regina, seine Frau
- Franz Loskarn as Lois, Großknecht
- Kurt Baumann-Grandeit as Peter, Knecht
- Klaramaria Skala as Gertraud, Magd
- Paula Braend as Großdirn
- Edeltraud Schenk as Vroni, Kucheldirn
- Michl Lang as Hagbauer, Bürgermeister
- Hannes Keppler as Erlhofer
- Karl Skraup as Vinzenz Haunstetter, Pfannenflicker
- Martha Kunig-Rinach as Maria Haunstetter
- Ludwig Meier as Der kleine Andreas
- Alfred Pongratz as Vollmershauser, Holzhändler
- Emil Matousek as Michael - sein Sohn
- Thea Aichbichler as Monika, seine Frau
- Heinrich Hauser as Wiesmatinger - ein alter Bauer

== See also ==
- Überläufer

== Bibliography ==
- Bock, Hans-Michael & Bergfelder, Tim. The Concise Cinegraph: Encyclopaedia of German Cinema. Berghahn Books, 2009.
