= Between Time and Eternity =

1957 film directed by Arthur Maria Rabenalt

- Spanish release poster
- German: Zwischen Zeit und Ewigkeit
- Directed by: Arthur Maria Rabenalt
- Written by: José María Palacio; Robert Thoeren
- Produced by: Otto Lehmann
- Starring: Lilli Palmer; Willy Birgel; Carlos Thompson
- Cinematography: Georg Bruckbauer
- Edited by: Alexandra Anatra; Ana Rusche
- Music by: Bert Grund
- Production companies: Estela Films; Neue Terra
- Distributed by: Europa-Filmverleih
- Release date: 15 November 1956
- Running time: 83 minutes
- Countries: West Germany; Spain
- Language: German

Between Time and Eternity (German: Zwischen Zeit und Ewigkeit) is a 1956 West German-Spanish drama film directed by Arthur Maria Rabenalt and starring Lilli Palmer, Willy Birgel and Carlos Thompson. It was co-produced with Spain as part of a growing trend in European production.

The film's sets were designed by the art directors Albrecht Becker and Herbert Kirchhoff. It was shot in Eastmancolor.

== Cast ==
- Lilli Palmer as Nina Bohlen
- Willy Birgel as Prof. Thomas Bohlen
- Carlos Thompson as Manuel
- Robert Lindner as Erich v. Häusserman
- Peter Capell as Police Inspector
- Ellen Schwiers as Consuela
- Herta Worell
- Sigrid von Richthofen
- Manuel Collado
- Bob Iller
- Walter Klam
- Francisco Bernal
- Marisa de Leza
- Enrique González
- Pilar Gómez Ferrer
- Rosario Manau
- Ena Sedeño
