= Ottmar Ostermayr =

German film producer

- Born: 24 October 1886; Munich, Bavaria; German Empire
- Died: 15 December 1958 (aged 72); Munich, Bavaria; West Germany
- Occupations: Producer; Director
- Years active: 1910–1958

Ottmar Ostermayr (24 October 1886 – 15 December 1958) was a German film producer. He was the brother of Franz Osten and Peter Ostermayr. From 1911 until 1914 he worked for Vienna subsidiary of the French company Eclair. In the 1920s he set up a production company with the film pioneer Oskar Messter. He was later employed at the Munich-based Bavaria Film which had been set up by his brother Peter.

== Selected filmography ==
- The Fountain of Madness (1921)
- Volga Volga (1928)
- Napoleon at Saint Helena (1929)
- Rendezvous in Vienna (1936)
- His Daughter is Called Peter (1936)
- The Secret Lie (1938)
- The Eternal Spring (1940)
- Venus on Trial (1941)
- To Be God One Time (1942)
- The Dark Day (1943)
- Regimental Music (1950)
- The Cloister of Martins (1951)
- The Crucifix Carver of Ammergau (1952)
- Marriage Strike (1953)
- Hubertus Castle (1954)
- The Vulture Wally (1956)

== Bibliography ==
- Bock, Hans-Michael & Bergfelder, Tim. The Concise CineGraph. Encyclopedia of German Cinema. Berghahn Books, 2009.
