= Vanished Melody =

1952 Austrian film by Eduard von Borsody

- East German theatrical release poster
- Directed by: Eduard von Borsody
- Written by: Johannes Mario Simmel; Eduard von Borsody
- Produced by: Josef A. Vesely
- Starring: Elfie Mayerhofer; Robert Lindner; Evelyn Künneke
- Cinematography: Helmut Ashley
- Edited by: Paula Dvorak; Maria Schmid
- Music by: Willy Schmidt-Gentner
- Production companies: Nova-Film; Wien-Film
- Distributed by: Universal-Film; Herzog Film
- Release date: 27 June 1952
- Running time: 100 minutes
- Country: Austria
- Language: German

Vanished Melody (German: Verlorene Melodie) is a 1952 Austrian musical comedy film directed by Eduard von Borsody and starring Elfie Mayerhofer, Robert Lindner and Evelyn Künneke. It was shot at the Sievering Studios and Schönbrunn Studios in Vienna. The film's sets were designed by the art director Julius von Borsody. It was distributed in East Germany by Progress Film and in West Germany by Herzog Film.

== Synopsis ==
The young singer Gretl has a love for classical music, but finds it out of fashion in post-war Vienna where more Jazzy tunes are popular. She meets the composer Franz who has similar views to her, and is consequently out of work. She manages to get them jobs in a bar playing modern music, despite their distaste for it. Gretl becomes concerned when she believes Franz has fallen for American singer Gloria, and his turn towards the sort of modern music she plays threatens his hopes of a commission for a classical ballet.

== Cast ==
- Elfie Mayerhofer as Gretl Viennese
- Robert Lindner as Franz
- Evelyn Künneke as Gloria American Jazz-Singer
- Annie Rosar as Frau Zangerl
- Hermann Erhardt as Schaffelhofer
- Heinz Moog as Director Gayer
- Hans Putz as Toni
- Karl Skraup as Wiesinger
- Otto Wögerer as Cordoba
- Fritz Muliar as Karli
- Wolfgang Hebenstreit as Johann Strauß Sohn
- Peter Alexander as Pianist

== Bibliography ==
- Bock, Hans-Michael & Bergfelder, Tim. The Concise CineGraph. Encyclopedia of German Cinema. Berghahn Books, 2009.
- Fritsche, Maria. Homemade Men in Postwar Austrian Cinema: Nationhood, Genre and Masculinity. Berghahn Books, 2013.
