= The Endless Road =

1943 film

- Directed by: Hans Schweikart
- Written by: Walter von Molo (novel and screenplay); Ernst von Salomon
- Produced by: Gerhard Staab
- Starring: Eugen Klöpfer; Eva Immermann; Hedwig Wangel
- Cinematography: Franz Koch
- Edited by: Ludolf Grisebach
- Music by: Oskar Wagner
- Production company: Bavaria Film
- Distributed by: Deutsche Filmvertriebs
- Release date: 24 August 1943
- Running time: 96 minutes
- Country: Germany
- Language: German

The Endless Road (German: Der Unendliche Weg) is a 1943 German biographical film directed by Hans Schweikart and starring Eugen Klöpfer, Eva Immermann and Hedwig Wangel. It was shot at the Bavaria Studios in Munich. The film's sets were designed by the art director Hans Sohnle. It portrays the life of Friedrich List, a German who emigrated to the United States in the nineteenth century. Unusually the film was overtly pro-American at a time when the two countries were at war. This was possibly because the Nazi leadership hoped to shortly join the Americans in an anti-Soviet alliance and wanted to encourage warmer feelings between the two nations. Another pro-American (and anti-British) film about Thomas Paine was planned, but never made.

It was made by Bavaria Film, one of the four major German film companies of the era. The film's sets were designed by the art director Hans Sohnle.

== Cast ==
- Eugen Klöpfer as Friedrich List
- Eva Immermann as Mila List, seine Tochter
- Hedwig Wangel as Susan Harper
- Alice Treff as Helen Harper
- Kurt Müller-Graf as von Runge
- Friedrich Domin as Prince Metternich
- Ernst Fritz Fürbringer as General Andrew Jackson
- Lisa Helwig as Karoline List
- Viktor Afritsch as Hofrat Friedrich von Gentz
- Joseph Offenbach as Seybold
- Adolf Gondrell as Ritter
- Günther Hadank as King Frederick William IV of Prussia
- Gustav Waldau as King William I of Württemberg
- Walter Holten as Kommandant von Hohenasperg
- Herbert Hübner as Handelsgerichtsbeisitzender
- Oskar Höcker as Würtembergischer Kammerpräsident
- Fritz Reiff as Preussischer Minister
- Walter Buhse
- Heinz Burkart
- Wolfgang Dohnberg
- Peter Doming
- Karl Graumann
- Karl Hanft
- Hannes Keppler
- Herbert Kroll
- Else Kündinger
- Walter Lantzsch
- Eduard Loibner
- Philipp Manning
- Emil Matousek
- Sepp Nigg
- Julius Riedmueller
- Sonja Gerda Scholz
- F.W. Schröder-Schrom
- Otz Tollen
- Anni Trautner
- Adalbert von Cortens

== Bibliography ==
- Hull, David Stewart (1969). Film in the Third Reich: A Study of the German Cinema, 1933–1945. Berkeley: University of California Press. ISBN 978-0-520-01489-3.
