= The Questionnaire (Salomon novel) =

1951 novel by Ernst von Salomon

- First edition
- Author: Ernst von Salomon
- Original title: Der Fragebogen
- Translator: Constantine Fitzgibbon
- Language: German
- Publisher: Rowohlt Verlag
- Publication date: 1951
- Publication place: West Germany
- English publication date: 1955
- Pages: 807

The Questionnaire (German: Der Fragebogen) is a 1951 autobiographical novel by the German writer Ernst von Salomon. It was published in the United Kingdom as The Answers. It is based on the denazification questionnaire which all Germans with some form of responsibility were forced to take by the military government after World War II. Salomon's detailed answers about his political background, membership of various organisations, and activities before and during the war reflect Germany during the interwar period, World War II and the immediate post-war period.

The book became a phenomenon in Germany and sold in large numbers. It was a reference point in the public discourse for years and has continued to be in print.

== Plot ==
Salomon answers questions and recounts his time as a cadet in the Weimar Republic and in the Freikorps. He writes about battles in the Baltic states and about his involvement in the assassination of foreign minister Walther Rathenau. Salomon shares his experiences in 1930s France, in the German film industry during the NS era, the end of the war (which he spent in Bavaria with his Jewish girlfriend), and how he was tortured in an American internment camp.

== Publication ==
The book was published by Rowohlt Verlag in 1951. It quickly became popular in Germany and reached six-digit sales numbers within a few years. It has continuously been reprinted in new editions. An English translation by Constantine Fitzgibbon, The Answers, was published in 1954. The American edition is known as The Questionnaire.

== Reception ==
Frederic Morton of The Saturday Review wrote about the English-language publication: "The publishers' praise on the dust jacket consists mostly of apology; the 'quotes' used attack rather than support the book; the translation, though technically competent and idiomatically accomplished, somehow smothers the brutal elegance of the German original, making it seem like a war documentary done in rainbow technicolor and set to fairytale music." Morton continued: "Yet the book retains its pathogenic significance. ... What distinguishes these retorts is a candor not only unflinching but, one surmises occasionally, not unembellished. Herr von Salomon brandishes his honesty-about-the-past with a braggadoccio piousness." Kirkus Reviews wrote: "A big, sprawling book for the close follower of contemporary history, particularly German, rather than the average reader, this has many flashes of impudence, a sharp wit and a quick sleight of hand to enliven its serious accounting."
