= In München steht ein Hofbräuhaus (film) =

German 1951 comedy film

- Directed by: Siegfried Breuer
- Release date: 1951
- Country: West Germany

In München steht ein Hofbräuhaus is a German comedy film directed by Siegfried Breuer in 1951.

== Plot ==
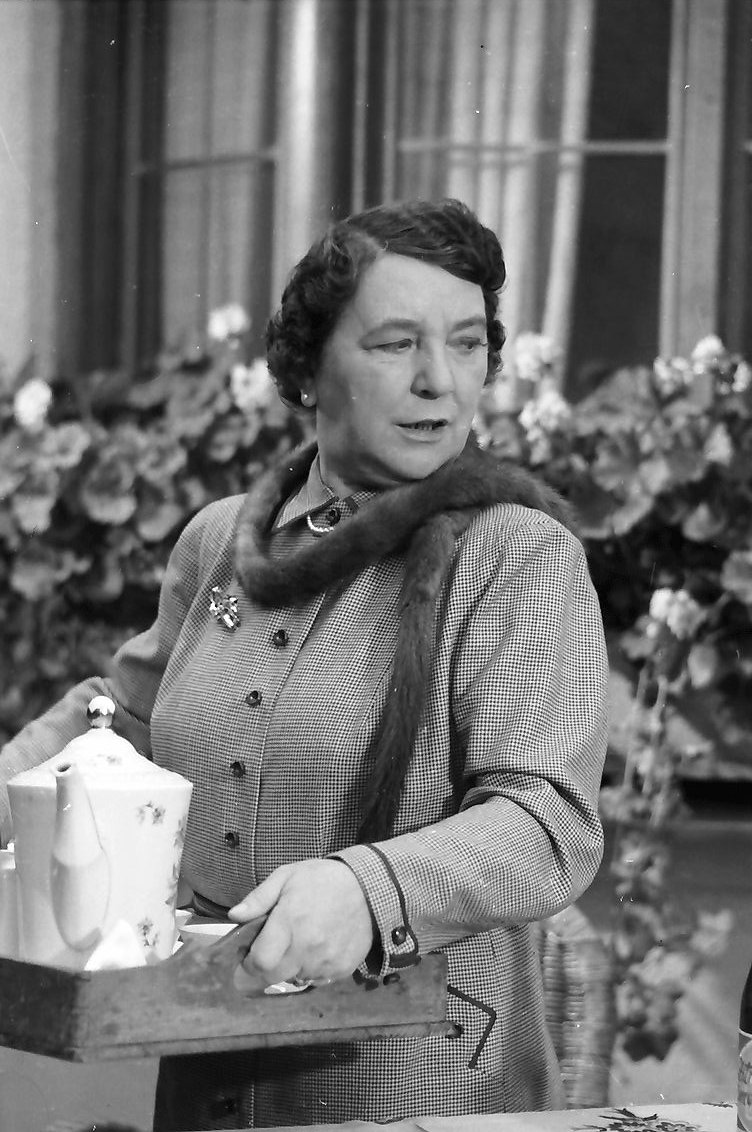
Liesl Karlstadt as Theresa Wurzinger during filming.

Berlin shortly after World War II: Otto Kackelmann runs a cola drink factory together with his wife. He markets his product, Ko-Ka-Ki, as well as he can. His daughter Lotte, called Häsecken, is studying to be an actress. One day she comes home in a happy mood after winning a competition in Quick magazine. She has won a visit for herself and a companion to the Oktoberfest in Munich. Her mother Hermine immediately signs up as her companion, as the family has inheritance disputes to be settled in Munich. Otto's uncle named Otto and his cousin Gustl Wurzinger, who is a tenant at the Hofbräuhaus am Platzl, as his sole heirs. The only condition was that both men reconcile and invest the money in a common project. As both men are stubborn - Gustl cannot forgive Otto for stealing Hermine away from him - the inheritance is in danger of being lost. Otto also travels to Munich, where he plans to open his own stand at the Oktoberfest to sell Ko-Ka-Ki.

In Munich, Otto meets variety worker Hermann Busch who helps him sell Ko-Ka-Ki. Hermann takes care of Lotte, whom he would like to date, but he lacks the means and opportunity towards that end. Lotte meets Gustl and his son Peter by accident and introduces herself as "Lotte Schmidt". She claims to work for Otto and unsuccessfully attempts to bring about a reconciliation between Otto and Gustl. Meanwhile, Otto meets Gustl's wife Therese in the Hofbräuhaus and entertains her with fictional tales of having visited Africa. After a visit by Otto and Gustl to the notary becomes a disaster, Hermine contacts Gustl and takes him to the Wurzinger vacation home. Here Gustl wishes to rekindle his love for Hermine in his youth. However, Hermine has written a letter to Therese, where she tells her marriage could be in danger. Hermine and Gustl meet in Gustl's vacation home and Gustl immediately attempts to take Hermine away. She admits she is only really interested in a reconciliation between Otto and Gustl, which Gustl immediately rejects. When Therese appears at the vacation house, Hermine refuses to leave. In an emergency, Gustl agrees to a reconciliation with Otto and Hermine escapes through a window. She returns to Munich and is picked up by Gustl and Therese on the way. They return to Munich together and the two women get along really well. The three meet Peter and Lotte in front of the Hofbräuhaus, making their identities known. Otto also appears at this point and Therese realises who this explorer of Africa really is. During this meeting the animosity between the families disappears, as long as Gustl keeps away from Hermine. The notary informs the two families that the inheritance has already been planned to build an orphanage, which the Wurzingers and the Kackelmanns agree to. Lotte and Peter fall in love and Otto donates his company to Hermann Busch, who has been interested in marketing Ko-Ka-Ki.

== Production ==
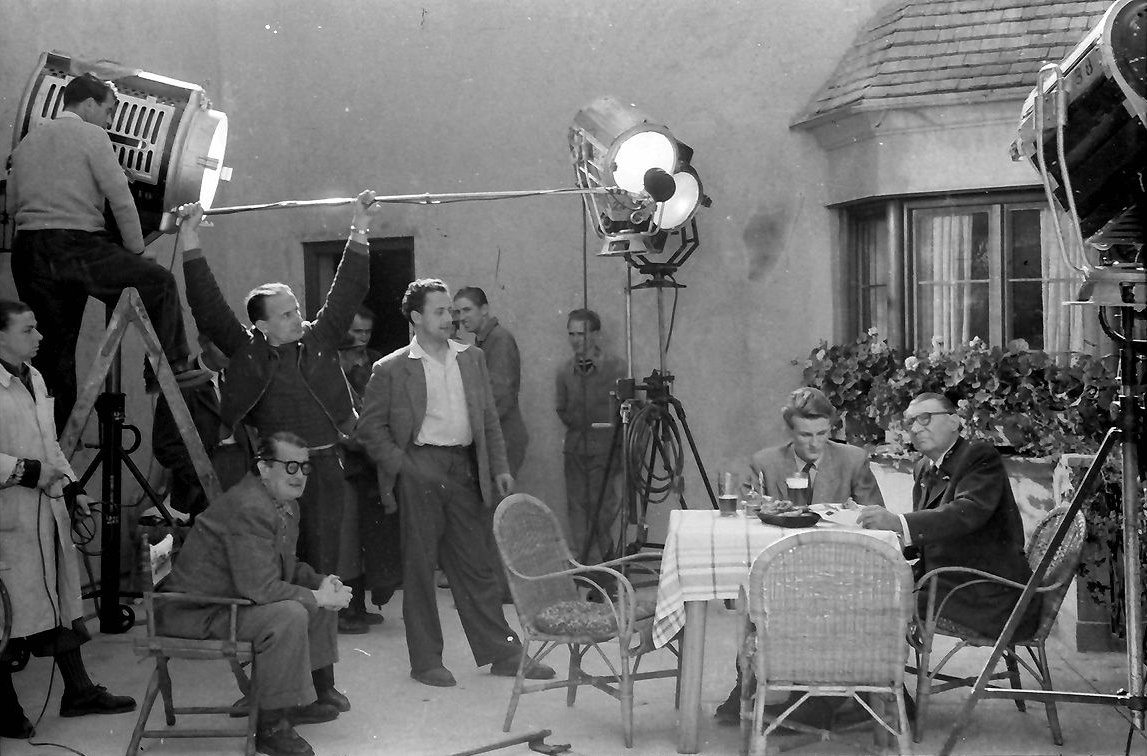
Director Siegfried Breuer (left, seated) with actors Rudolf Melichar and Carl Wery (right, sitting at table) during filming.

In München steht ein Hofbräuhaus was filmed in Berlin and in the Bavaria-Atelier in Munich. The costumes were designed by Charlotte Flemming and the scenery by Hans Ledersteger. The film premiered on 21 December 1951 in the Munich New Town Hall and was distributed among German cinemas from 24 January 1952. The film appeared on DVD in 2011.

== Reception ==
"The couples Fita Benkhoff - Paul Kemp and Liels Karlstadt - Carl Wery constantly dish out old puns and time-tested tropes to promote Munich, the Oktoberfest, the Hofbräuhaus and 'associated imagery'", wrote Der Spiegel about the premiere.

The Lexikon des internationalen Films said that the film was "a real Bavarian Gaudi with puns and prominent tourist promotion despite its apparent comedy".

"Two families go through an inheritance dispute", wrote Cinema.
