= Beloved Liar =

1950 film

- Elfie Mayerhofer and Hans Söhnker
- Directed by: Hans Schweikart
- Written by: Hans Schweikart; Helmut Weiss
- Produced by: Georg Richter
- Starring: Elfie Mayerhofer; Hans Söhnker; Gustav Knuth
- Cinematography: Werner Krien
- Edited by: Adolf Schlyssleder
- Music by: Franz Grothe
- Production companies: Bavaria Film; Camera-Filmproduktion
- Distributed by: Anton E. Dietz-Filmverleih
- Release date: 13 January 1950
- Running time: 87 minutes
- Country: West Germany
- Language: German

Beloved Liar (German: Geliebter Lügner) is a 1950 West German romantic comedy film directed by Hans Schweikart and starring Elfie Mayerhofer, Hans Söhnker and Gustav Knuth.

It was made at the Bavaria Studios in Munich and on location at Lake Starnberg. The film's sets were designed by Robert Herlth.

== Cast ==
- Elfie Mayerhofer as Jeanette
- Hans Söhnker as Rudolf Siebert
- Gustav Knuth as Braubach
- Erich Ponto as Plage
- Werner Fuetterer as Dr. Gößler
- Hans Leibelt as Direktor Berger
- Charlott Daudert as Modell
- Margarete Haagen as Frau Weber
- Thea Aichbichler as Frau Wanninger
- Marietheres Angerpointner as Anita
- Charlotta Vetrone as Lilo
- Elisabeth Goebel as Fräulein Kiekebusch
- Peter Hansmann as Peter
- Hans Reiser as Erich

== Bibliography ==
- Hans-Michael Bock and Tim Bergfelder. The Concise Cinegraph: An Encyclopedia of German Cinema. Berghahn Books, 2009.
