= Dagny Servaes =

German-Austrian actress

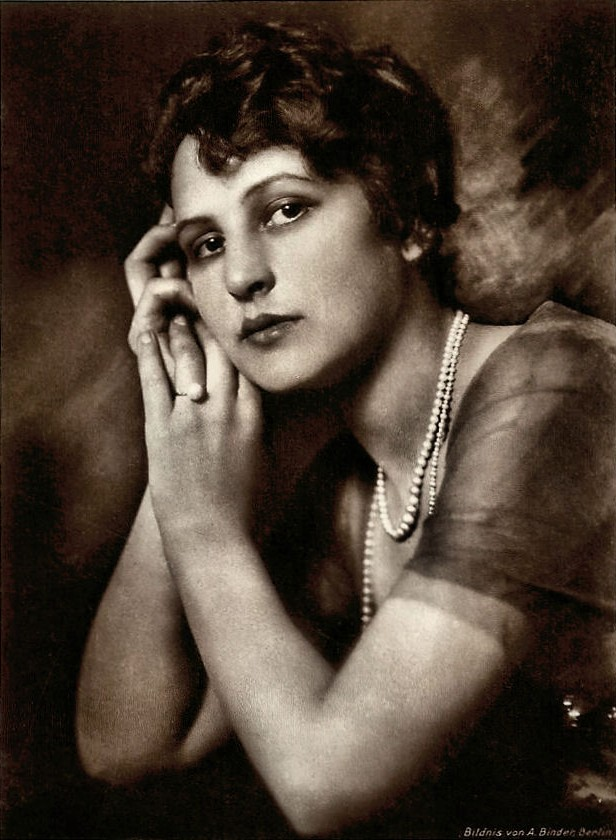
- Born: 10 March 1894; Berlin, German Empire
- Died: 10 July 1961 (aged 67); Vienna, Austria
- Resting place: Grinzing Cemetery, Vienna
- Occupations: Film and stage actress
- Years active: 1916–1958
- Relatives: Reginald Servaes (cousin)

Dagny Servaes (10 March 1894 – 10 July 1961) was a German-Austrian stage and film actress. In the theatre she appeared in the productions of Max Reinhardt and Berthold Brecht. Servaes appeared in around sixty films during her career, initially in lead and later in supporting roles. One of her earliest screen performances was in the 1917 propaganda film Dr. Hart's Diary. She also voiced the character of the evil queen in a German language dub of Disney's Snow White and the Seven Dwarfs made for the Austrian market in 1938.

== Personal life ==
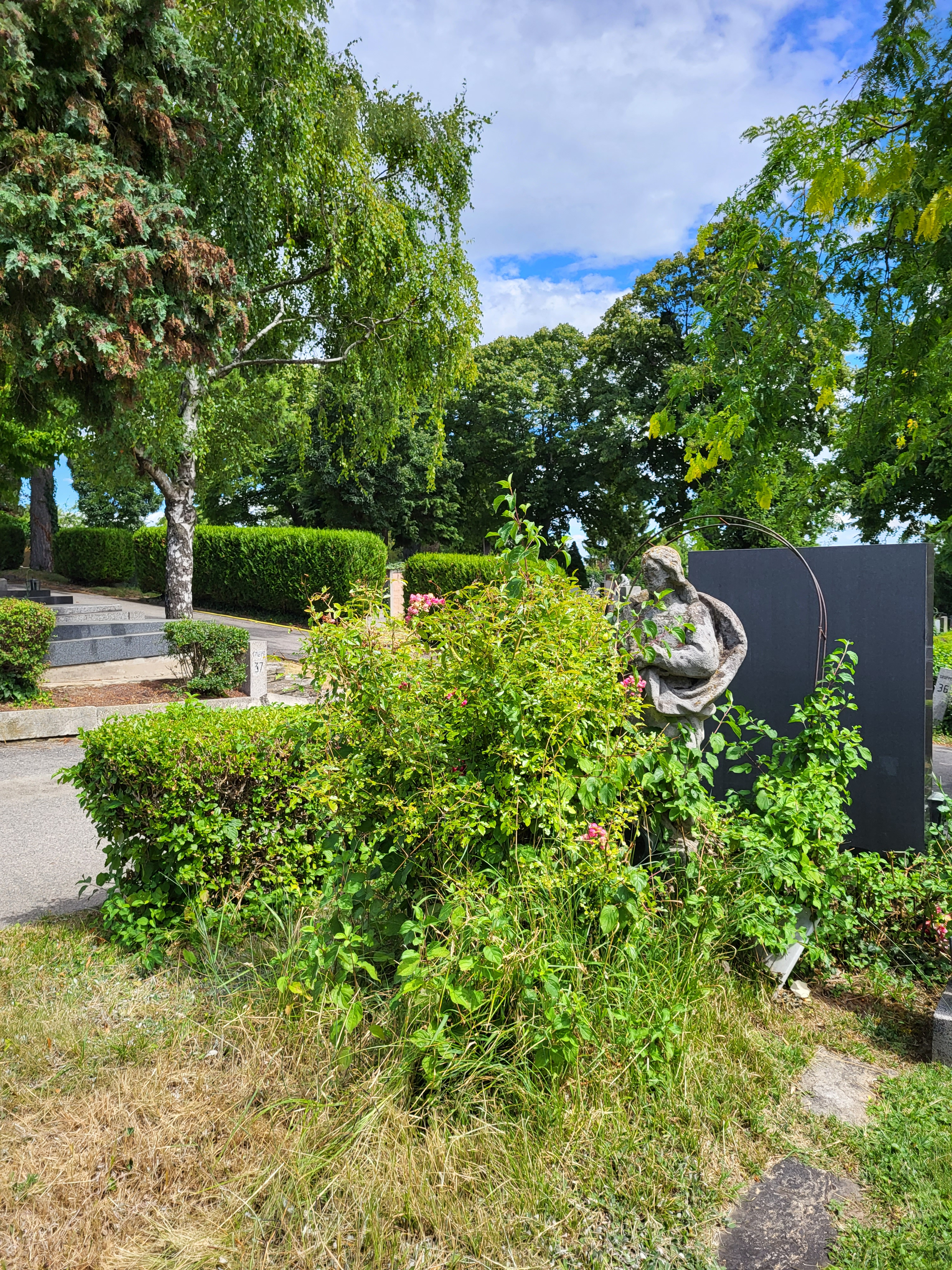
Grave of Dagny Servaes at the Grinzing Cemetery in Vienna

Servaes was born in Berlin in the German Empire (present day Germany) to parents Martha (née Haese) and Franz Theodor Hubert Servaes. She had with Erwin Goldarbeiter, a daughter, Evi Servaes, who also became an actress in movies and on stage. She had a brother, Roderich Servaes, whose son Arnim became a stage actor as well. Through her father, she was cousins with Vice Admiral Reginald Servaes. She is also distant cousins to English actor Tom Hiddleston.

== Selected filmography ==
- Dr. Hart's Diary (1917)
- The Loves of Pharaoh (1922)
- Peter the Great (1922)
- Adam and Eve (1923)
- The Tales of Hoffmann (1923)
- Carlos and Elisabeth (1924)
- Modern Marriages (1924)
- In the Name of the King (1924)
- Remembrance (1924)
- Colonel Redl (1925)
- Fadette (1926)
- The Student of Prague (1926)
- Grand Hotel (1927)
- The Weavers (1927)
- Golgotha (1933)
- The Fairy Doll (1936)
- Florentine (1937)
- The Unexcused Hour (1937)
- Nanon (1938)
- A Prussian Love Story (1938)
- Mirror of Life (1938)
- The Deruga Case (1938)
- Immortal Waltz (1939)
- The Sensational Casilla Trial (1939)
- Friedrich Schiller (1940)
- The Golden City (1942)
- Laugh Bajazzo (1943)
- Laugh, Pagliacci (1943)
- The Immortal Face (1947)
- The Queen of the Landstrasse (1948)
- Eroica (1949)
- Night of the Twelve (1949)
- The Fourth Commandment (1950)
- Maria Theresa (1951)
- Wedding in the Hay (1951)
- Have The World For Me (1953)
- Daughter of the Regiment (1953)

=== Theatre ===
- A Midsummer Night's Dream (December 1927) – Hippolyta
- Jedermann (December 1927 – January 1928) – Lechery
- Danton's Tod (January 1928) – Julie
- Peripherie – Anna

== Bibliography ==
- Prawer, S. S. Between Two Worlds: The Jewish Presence in German and Austrian Film, 1910-1933. Berghahn Books, 2005.
- Styan, J. L. Max Reinhardt . CUP Archive, 1982.
