= Elisabeth Markus =

Austrian actress

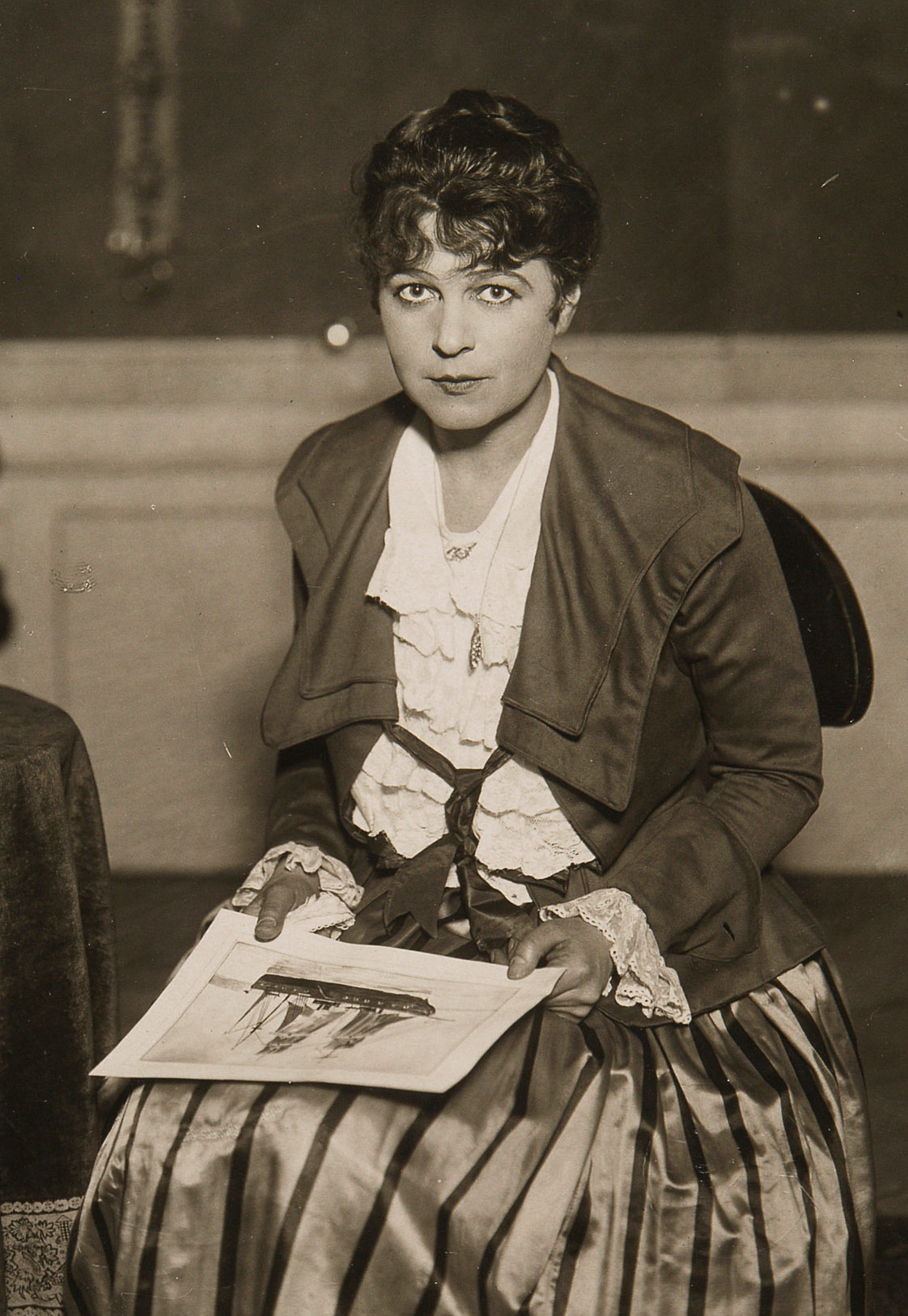
- Born: Elisabeth Martha Leopoldine Francisca Markus; 15 December 1895; Weikersdorf am Steinfelde, Lower Austria; Austria-Hungary
- Died: 19 January 1970 (aged 74); Vienna, Austria
- Resting place: Vienna Central Cemetery
- Occupation: Actress
- Years active: 1917–1966

Elisabeth Markus (15 December 1895 – 19 January 1970) was an Austrian stage, film and radio actress.

== Selected filmography ==
- A Star Fell from Heaven (1934)
- Maria Ilona (1939)
- A Mother's Love (1939)
- Beloved World (1942)
- The Rainer Case (1942)
- Back Then (1943)
- I'll Carry You in My Arms (1943)
- Der Fall Molander (1945)
- Anni (1948)
- On Resonant Shores (1948)
- The Appeal to Conscience (1949)
- Sensation in San Remo (1951)
- Daughter of the Regiment (1953)
- Your Heart Is My Homeland (1953)
- The Witch (1954)
- The Unexcused Hour (1957)
- When the Grapevines Bloom on the Danube (1965)
- Count Bobby, The Terror of The Wild West (1966)
