= Fritz Reiff =

German actor (1888–1953)

- Born: 1888; German Empire
- Died: 18 January 1953 (aged 64–65); Munich, Bavaria, West Germany
- Occupation: Actor
- Years active: 1922–1951 (film)

Fritz Reiff (1888–1953) was a German stage and film actor. Primarily a theatre actor, he appeared in a number of films made by the Munich-based company Bavaria Film in small, supporting parts.

== Filmography ==
Year	Title	Role	Notes
1920	Geheimbundsklaven. 1. Dinge zwischen Himmel und Erde	Fernando Juarez	
1922	Geheimbundsklaven. 2. Die Macht der Verschworenen	Fernando Juarez	
1923	Die Spitzklöpperin von Valenciennes		
1930	Dreyfus	Jean Jaures	
1930	The Flute Concert of Sanssouci	Grenadier	
1933	Ripening Youth	Herr Sengebusch	
1937	Der Katzensteg	Graf Alexander von Schranden	
1938	Dreizehn Mann und eine Kanone		
1939	Three Wonderful Days		
1939	Water for Canitoga	Ormand	
1940	The Eternal Spring	Richter	
1940	The Girl from Barnhelm	Stabsoffizier	
1941	The Girl from Fano	Patentanwalt	
1941	Der siebente Junge	Freiherr von Klessheim - Adjutant	
1941	Venus on Trial	Der Vorsitzende Richter	
1942	Between Heaven and Earth		
1942	To Be God One Time	Falkner - Portier	
1943	The Dark Day	Bankier Engelbrecht, Georgias Vater	
1943	The Endless Road	Preussischer Minister	
1943	Man rede mir nicht von Liebe	Man rede mir nicht von Liebe	
1944	Die keusche Sünderin		Uncredited
1949	Verspieltes Leben	Pastor Gundermann	
1950	Regimental Music	Hausarzt bei Wahl	
1951	One Night's Intoxication	Generaldirektor Wittemann	
1951	Immortal Light	Engländer	(final film role)

== Bibliography ==
- Klaus Volker. Fritz Kortner. Hentrich, 1987.
