= Anja Kruse =

German film and television actress (born 1956)

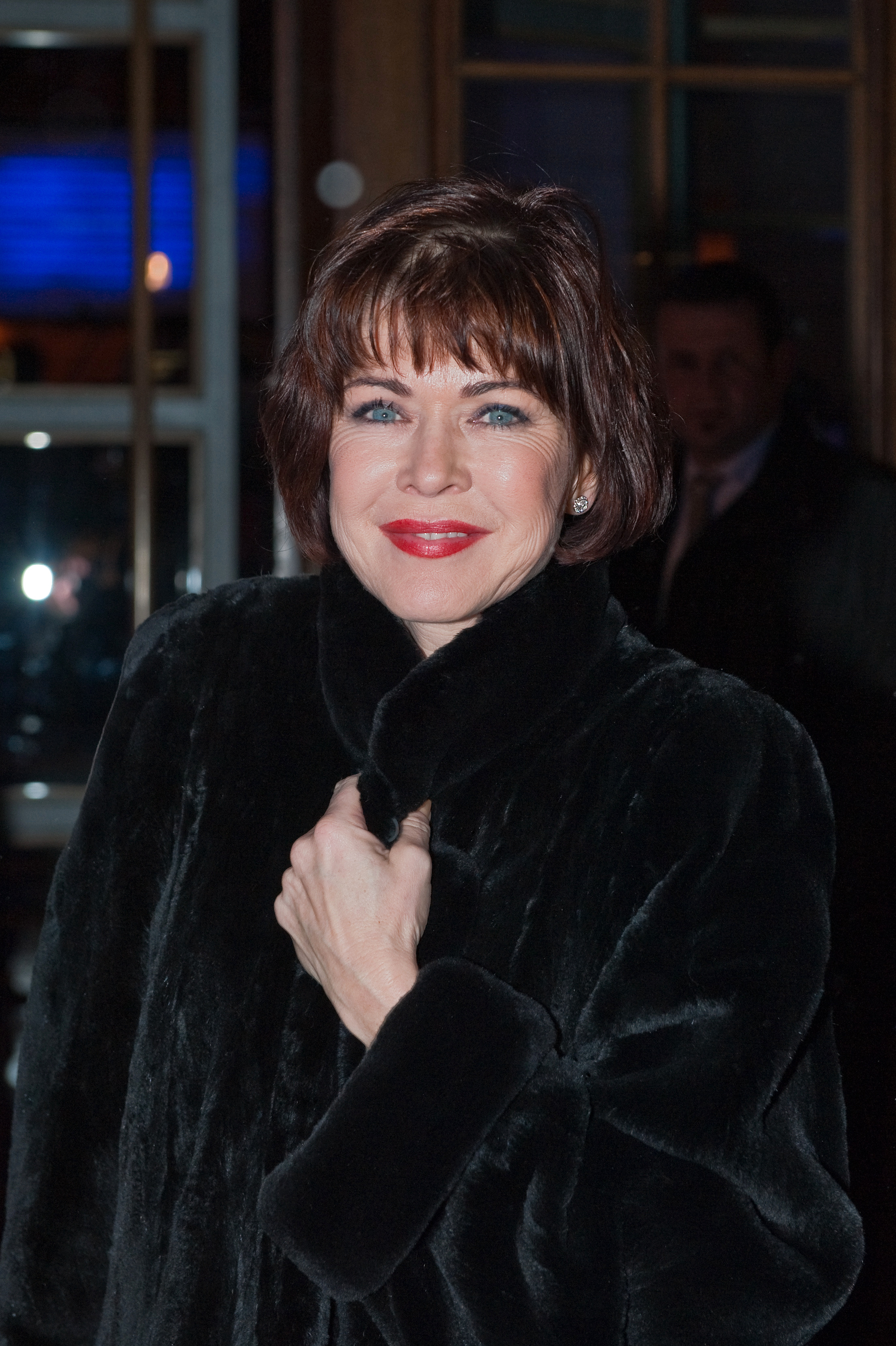
- Kruse in 2010
- Born: 5 August 1956 (age 69); Essen, North Rhine-Westphalia, West Germany
- Occupation: Actress
- Years active: 1979–present

Anja Kruse (born 5 August 1956) is a German film and television actress. She played the title role in the 1984 historical series Beautiful Wilhelmine.

== Selected filmography ==
=== Film ===
- The White Rose (1982)
- Die Einsteiger (1985)
- Schloß Königswald (1988)
- Jump! (2007)
- Vivaldi, the Red Priest (2009)
- The Gardener of God (2013)

=== Television ===
- Beautiful Wilhelmine (1984)
- The Black Forest Clinic (1986–1987)
- Le Retour d'Arsène Lupin (1989)
- By Way of the Stars (1992)
- Glückliche Reise (1992–1993)
- The Alaska Kid (1993)
- La Légende d'Aliséa (1996)
- Die ProSieben Märchenstunde (2006)

== Bibliography ==
- Klossner, Michael. The Europe of 1500–1815 on Film and Television: A Worldwide Filmography of Over 2550 Works, 1895 Through 2000. McFarland & Company, 2002.
