= The Song of the Nightingale (1944 film) =

1944 film

- Directed by: Theo Lingen
- Written by: Jacob Geis; Franz Gribitz; Theo Lingen
- Based on: Die gelbe Nachtigall by Hermann Bahr
- Produced by: Gerhard Staab
- Starring: Elfie Mayerhofer; Johannes Riemann; Paul Kemp
- Cinematography: Erich Claunigk
- Edited by: Ludolf Grisebach
- Music by: Oskar Wagner
- Production company: Bavaria Film
- Distributed by: Deutsche Filmvertriebs
- Release date: 7 January 1944
- Running time: 90 minutes
- Country: Germany
- Language: German

The Song of the Nightingale (German: Das Lied der Nachtigall) is a 1944 German musical drama film directed by Theo Lingen and starring Elfie Mayerhofer, Johannes Riemann and Paul Kemp. It was shot at the Bavaria Studios in Munich. The film's sets were designed by the art director Hans Sohnle.

== Cast ==
- Elfie Mayerhofer as Fanny Hobichler
- Johannes Riemann as Alfred Lorm, Operasinger
- Paul Kemp as Kapellmeister Schnepf
- Theo Lingen as Der Sekretär
- Margot Hielscher as Prinzessin Monika
- Will Dohm as Intendant von Bodenstein
- Fritz Odemar as Fürst Monterniccolo
- Kurt Müller-Graf as Graf Werdenburg
- Annie Rosar as Frau Hobichler
- Ellen Hille as Die Köchin Mathilde
- Adolf Gondrell as Dr. Streu
- Margarete Haagen as Herzogin von Lichteneck

== Bibliography ==
- Bock, Hans-Michael & Bergfelder, Tim. The Concise CineGraph. Encyclopedia of German Cinema. Berghahn Books, 2009.
- Klaus, Ulrich J. Deutsche Tonfilme. Klaus-Archiv, 1988.
