= Die schöne Wilhelmine =

1965 novel by Ernst von Salomon

- First edition
- Author: Ernst von Salomon
- Cover artist: Anna Dorothea Therbusch - Portrait of Wilhelmine Encke
- Language: German
- Publisher: Deutscher Bücherbund
- Publication date: 1965
- Publication place: West Germany
- Pages: 476

Die schöne Wilhelmine ("the beautiful Wilhelmine") is a 1965 novel by the German writer Ernst von Salomon. It tells the story of the romance between the Prussian king Friedrich Wilhelm II and his mistress Wilhelmine Encke during the second half of the 18th century.

== Reception ==
Louis Ferdinand, Prince of Prussia, reviewed the book in Der Spiegel: "The author views his novel's hero and heroine completely from their own period. This succeeds in a masterly manner. All recurring characters are presented to us as full-blooded people." The prince continued: "Puritanically inclined readers will probably not enjoy this material with too much pleasure. However, the meticulous erotic passages at the start could also repel some jaded readers. But as the action progresses these descriptions become more and more peripherical and negligible."

== Adaptation ==
The book was adapted into a ZDF television serial with the same title. It was directed by Rolf von Sydow and broadcast in four episodes in September 1984.
