= Head porter =

Head porter can refer to:

- the most senior porter at a college
- a porter who uses head-carrying
  - a kayayoo (pl. kayayei), a Ghanaian female head-carrier
