= Ludolf Grisebach =

German film editor

- Occupation: Editor
- Years active: 1933–1966 (film)

Ludolf Grisebach was a German film editor. He worked on over thirty films between 1933 and 1966.

== Selected filmography ==
- The Tsarevich (1933)
- Mother and Child (1934)
- Roses from the South (1934)
- The Sporck Battalion (1934)
- Trouble Backstairs (1935)
- Suburban Cabaret (1935)
- The Adventurer of Paris (1936)
- White Slaves (1937)
- The Citadel of Warsaw (1937)
- Pedro Will Hang (1941)
- The Big Game (1942)
- Anuschka (1942)
- To Be God One Time (1942)
- The Endless Road (1943)
- The Song of the Nightingale (1944)
- I Need You (1944)
- Night of the Twelve (1949)
- Law of Love (1949)
- Operation Edelweiss (1954)
- Circus of Love (1954)
- Escape to the Dolomites (1955)

== Bibliography ==
- Rentschler, Eric. The Films of G.W. Pabst: An Extraterritorial Cinema. Rutgers University Press, 1990.
