= Ernst von Salomon =

German writer

Ernst von Salomon (25 September 1902 – 9 August 1972) was a German novelist and screenwriter. A Freikorps member after WWI, he later joined the terror group Organisation Consul (1920–1922) and was convicted and imprisoned for taking part in the assassination of foreign minister Walther Rathenau. He was also convicted of attempted murder in the Feme murders case but was pardoned by Reich President Paul von Hindenburg. He then participated in the Conservative Revolution (1918–1933) and during the Nazi era wrote film scripts for UFA and served in the Volkssturm. He was arrested by US authorities after WWII and later wrote The Questionnaire about Allied denazification efforts.

== Family and education ==
He was born in Kiel, in the Prussian province of Schleswig-Holstein, the son of a criminal investigation officer. Salomon attended the Musterschule gymnasium in Frankfurt.

== Military service ==
From 1913 Salomon was raised as a cadet in Karlsruhe and in Lichterfelde near Berlin; during the German revolution of 1918–1919, he joined the paramilitary Freikorps ("Free-Corps") unit under Georg Ludwig Rudolf Maercker suppressing the Spartacist uprising. Later in 1919, he fought in the Baltic against the Bolsheviks and the Estonian and Latvian armies. With his unit he took part in the Kapp Putsch in March 1920. He also fought against Polish insurgents in the Silesian Uprisings of 1921.

== Political activity before and during WW2 ==
After the Freikorps units had been officially dissolved in 1920, Salomon joined the Organisation Consul and received a five-year prison sentence in 1922 for his part in the assassination of Foreign Minister Walther Rathenau – he provided a car for the assassins. In 1927, he received another prison sentence for an attempted Feme murder (paramilitary "self-justice"), and was pardoned by Reich President Paul von Hindenburg after a few months – he had not killed the severely wounded victim, Wagner, when he pleaded for his life, which was noted by the court.

After his release from prison, Salomon committed himself to the support of Feme murder convicts and began to publish feuilleton articles in the national conservative Deutsche Allgemeine Zeitung newspaper, which earned him the attention of Conservative Revolutionary and National Bolshevist circles around Friedrich Hielscher and Arnolt Bronnen.

In 1929, he backed his elder brother Bruno in his struggle for the Schleswig-Holstein Rural People's Movement by simulating a bomb attack on the Reichstag building in Berlin. He had to spend three months in investigative custody, during which time he finished writing his first novel The Outlaws (Die Geächteten), published by Ernst Rowohlt.

Unlike many other German writers and poets, he did not sign the Gelöbnis treuester Gefolgschaft proclamation of loyalty to Adolf Hitler. He had been arrested after the Nazi Machtergreifung, together with Hans Fallada, but was released after a few days. Suspiciously eyed by the authorities, who suspected him to be an adherent of Otto Strasser's "Third Position", he earned his living by writing film scripts for the German film company UFA. Salomon wrote the screenplay for the 1941 anti-British propaganda film Carl Peters. From October 1944 to May 1945, he was deployed in the local Volkssturm. Salomon supported Ernst Rowohlt after he had received a publishing ban for employing Jewish personnel and temporarily corresponded with conservative resistance circles around Arvid Harnack and Harro Schulze-Boysen. His lover, Ille Gotthelft, was Jewish but he was able to protect her from persecution by passing her off as his spouse.

In June 1945, Salomon was interned by American military occupation authorities due to his active opposition to democracy during the Weimar era and his proximity to Nazi ideology. Gotthelft was also interned. In his autobiographical The Answers, Salomon described how he and his lover were seriously mistreated by American soldiers when he was in custody, being called "Nazi pig!" and "despicable creatures". Salomon was imprisoned by the Americans until September 1946.

In 1951, Salomon published the book The Questionnaire (Der Fragebogen), in which he gave his ironic and sarcastic "Answers" to the 131-point questionnaire concerning people's activities between 1933 and 1945 which the Western Allied Military Governments in Germany issued by the tens of thousands at the end of the war. A famous public discussion of the book took place in the main train station of Cologne, organised by bookseller Gerhard Ludwig. Although Liberals and the Left condemned it violently, the book was a sensation in Germany between its publication in 1951 and 1954, by which time it had sold over 250,000 copies.

== Death ==
Ernst von Salomon died of heart failure at his home near Hamburg on 9 August 1972. He was 69 years of age.

== Selected filmography ==
- Men Without a Fatherland (1937)
- Rubber (1938)
- The Sensational Casilla Trial (1939)
- Carl Peters (1941)
- The Endless Road (1943)
- Johann (1943)
- The Dark Day (1943)
- Law of Love (1949)

== Bibliography ==
(Note: this bibliography is incomplete.)

- Die Geächteten (translated as The Outlaws) (1930), a fictionalized account of Ernst von Salomon's adventures as a Freikorps fighter.
- Die Stadt ("The City" – translated as It Cannot Be Stormed) (1932)
- Die Kadetten ("The Cadets") (1933)
- Putsch ("Coup d'État") (1933)
- Der Fragebogen (The Questionnaire or Answers to the 131 Questions of the Allied Military Government.) (Germany 1951). English edition, by Putnam, London, 1954.
- Die schöne Wilhelmine ("The Beautiful Wilhelmine") (1965)
- Der tote Preuße ("The Dead Prussian") (1973)
