= Wiener Film =

Austrian film genre

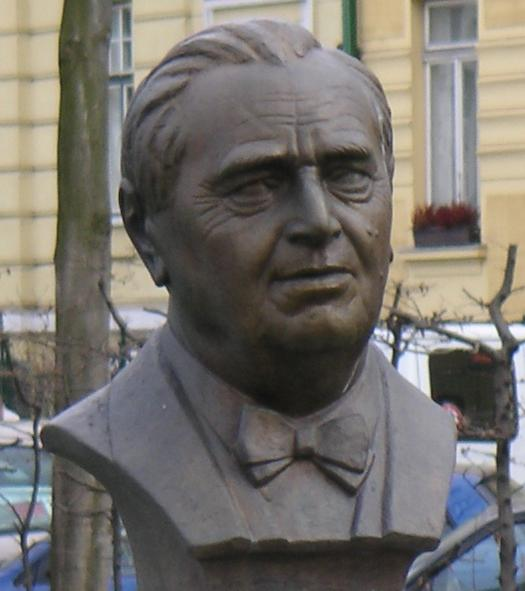
Hans Moser, one of the defining actors of the Wiener Film

Wiener Film (German; plural: Wiener Filme; literally, "Viennese film") is an Austrian film genre, consisting of a combination of comedy, romance and melodrama in a historical setting, mostly, and typically, the Vienna of the late 19th and early 20th centuries. The Wiener Film genre was in production between the 1920s and the 1950s, with the 1930s as its high period.

== Definition ==
These films are always set in the past, and achieve a high emotional impact by their oscillation between extreme emotional states, between hope and suffering, for example, or pleasure and loss. Most of them are set in the Vienna of the late 19th and early 20th centuries, when as the capital of the multiracial monarchy of the Austro-Hungarian Empire it had its greatest social and cultural significance. The protagonists belong to a variety of social classes, which adds to the interest of the relationships between them. The concepts of honour and morality of the period are often of great significance in the development of the plots. The Wiener Film is almost always happy, life-affirming and relaxed. Music and song feature prominently, either in the form of orchestral and musical scenes or as interpolated songs by the characters. Humour often arises from misunderstandings, mistaken identity, misadventures and the resultant efforts to restore order, with often farcical consequences.

Dramaturgically the Wiener Film generally contains several principal characters and several more subsidiary characters, all of whom recur frequently throughout the film as the action develops. They do not always all know each other, but are nevertheless connected by the plots and sub-plots running in parallel. The action mostly centres on love affairs great and small, often with elements of the comedy of mistaken identity. The films are generally unchallenging in terms of the contemporary socio-political issues and environment (for some rare exceptions see below).

== Historical development ==
The first films that can be classed as Wiener Filme were created in the 1920s, in the days of the silent film. The genre reached its full potential however with sound film, when the specifically Viennese dialect (see below), verbal dexterity and the characteristically Viennese acid wit (Wiener Schmäh) were able to come into their own and made the genre popular not only in Austria but also in Germany. Willi Forst's production Leise flehen meine Lieder, a biography of Franz Schubert, was so successful that an English-language version was made, under the title Unfinished Symphony. Willi Forst is one of the most significant directors of Wiener Film, and made what is generally reckoned to be the best of the genre, the 1935 film Maskerade.

The success of Wiener Film inspired Berlin to imitate the genre, substituting the Prussian court for that of the Habsburg monarchy and moving the setting from Vienna to Berlin. These films were admittedly also very popular in Germany, but the departure from the milieu of Vienna with its people and characteristic speech resulted in the loss of the distinctive atmosphere of the Austrian originals. A particularly good example is the 1931 UFA operetta Der Kongress tanzt by Erik Charell. On the other hand Max Ophüls demonstrated that Wiener Filme could also be made outside Vienna with his production Liebelei of 1933, in which he displays classic Viennese subject matter, although the film was produced in Berlin, with Willy Eichberger and Magda Schneider as the leads. Ophüls very carefully evoked the atmosphere of turn-of-the-century Vienna, while not neglecting to throw into sharp relief the hollow concepts of honour of that period.

During the time of the National Socialist government the popularity of the Wiener Film genre was assured: in almost every way it exactly met the National Socialist requirement for entertaining escapist cinema that distracted attention from reality to a dream world. The Wiener Film thus experienced a lengthening of its heyday, a sort of Late Baroque. Between 1938 and 1945 a few of these films were made with an anti-Semitic, anti-monarchist and anti-democratic undertone, for example E. W. Emo's Wien 1910. Most Wiener Filme however remained, as previously, unpolitical. In a few productions, notably Willi Forst's masterpiece Wiener Blut, there were even some sly digs at National Socialism.

After the end of National Socialism and of World War II many efforts were made to continue the Wiener Film with all its characteristic features. But the best were no more than mediocre, and the majority were simply bad copies of previous successes. The danger of exhausting the possibilities of what was in any case a very finite genre had been recognised by "Dr Volkmar Iro" as early as 1936: "the potential of Austrian film is nowhere near exhausted by the genuine Austrian milieu alone, and it would pose a certain danger for the continued development of the Austrian film industry if the artistic task of the Austrian film were to be regarded as the working over of nothing but Austrian film themes or the Austrian environment. For, as already mentioned, it is not possible with impunity continually to plunder a subject which is in any case limited."

== Viennese dialect ==
The Viennese dialect was perhaps the strongest asset of the Wiener Film. The film critic Frieda Grafe once described it as "German made fluid, which makes the listener realise that speech is a matrix of tone which can bring forth meaning simply by the impression of its sound long before it becomes communication in the strict sense". The dialect's many possibilities of expression, the precision, rapidity and fluid formulation of speech come close to the idiosyncratic verbal wit of American screwball comedy.

== Themes ==
Besides affairs from the social life of the period of the monarchy, Wiener Filme also occasionally dealt with more remote history, generally in the form of biographies of famous people, predominantly musicians and composers. Only one or two exceptional films exploit the possibilities of a more intensive engagement with social or political issues. The effort to do so was seldom made, but the results are all the more noteworthy for their rarity and impact. An example is … nur ein Komödiant (1935) by the German director Erich Engel. The anti-authoritarian plot, clearly directed against fascism, somehow managed to make it past not only the Austrian but also the German film censors, presumably because of the film's setting in the Rococo period. Werner Hochbaum, another German director who, like Engel, had taken refuge in Austria, made Vorstadtvarieté in 1935. Set shortly before World War I, this film deals powerfully with a number of Austrian and Prussian characters whose assumptions about life are disrupted by a romantic drama.

Also in 1935, Walter Reisch produced Episode, another outstanding example of a high-quality Wiener Film with added significance. The film is distinguished in that it is set against the economic crisis of 1922 in Vienna, which is not only evoked but, especially through the acting of Paula Wessely as a desperately impoverished student of commercial art, elevated into a moving psychological portrayal of Viennese double standards and hypocrisy. The film was also noteworthy as being the only Austrian film involving Jews in its production which after the takeover of the National Socialists in Germany succeeded in obtaining exceptional consent from the Reichsfilmkammer to be shown in the Third Reich.

Other highlights of the genre include Paul Fejos' masterpiece, Sonnenstrahl (1933) in the style of Poetic realism, and several of Willi Forst's films, among them the hugely successful Maskerade of 1934/35.

== Significant personalities ==
Some of the best-known stars of the Wiener Filme were Paula Wessely, Attila Hörbiger, Paul Hörbiger, Rudolf Carl, Fritz Imhoff, Leo Slezak, Magda Schneider and Willi Forst himself, who was not only an important director but also an actor. German filmstars also often put in an appearance. The best-known comics in the genre were the very different Hans Moser and Szöke Sakall, and in early sound films Richard Romanowsky.

The most popular composers were Willy Schmidt-Gentner and Robert Stolz.

== Selected Wiener Filme ==
- Die Pratermizzi (1927, director: Gustav Ucicky)
- Liebelei (1933, director: Max Ophüls)
- Sonnenstrahl (1933, director: Paul Fejos)
- Gently My Songs Entreat (1933, director Willi Forst)
- Maskerade (1934, director: Willi Forst)
- Hohe Schule (1934, director: Erich Engel)
- Episode (1935, director: Walter Reisch)
- Vorstadtvarieté (1935, director: Werner Hochbaum)
- ... nur ein Komödiant (1935, director: Erich Engel)
- Burgtheater (1936, director: Willi Forst)
- Bel Ami (1939, director: Willi Forst)
- Hotel Sacher (1939, director: Erich Engel)
- Operetta (1940, director: Willi Forst)
- Beloved Augustin (1941, director: E. W. Emo)
- Vienna Blood (1942, director: Willi Forst)
- Operetta (1942, director: Karl Hartl)
- Viennese Girls (1945/49, director: Willi Forst)
- Hallo Dienstmann (1952, director: Franz Antel)
- Die Deutschmeister (1955, director: Ernst Marischka)
- Opera Ball (1956, director: Ernst Marischka)

== Sources ==
- Fritz, Walter: Der Wiener Film im Dritten Reich. Vienna 1988
- Fritz, Walter, and Tötschinger, Gerhard, 1993: Maskerade - Kostüme des österreichischen Films; ein Mythos. Vienna: Kremayr & Scheriau Verlag. ISBN 3-218-00575-2
