= The Unfaithful Eckehart =

The Unfaithful Eckehart (German:Der ungetreue Eckehart) may refer to:

- The Unfaithful Eckehart (play), a play by Hans Stürm
- The Unfaithful Eckehart (1931 film), a German film directed by Carl Boese
- The Unfaithful Eckehart (1940 film), a German film directed by Hubert Marischka
