= Willy Schmidt-Gentner =

German composer (1894–1964)

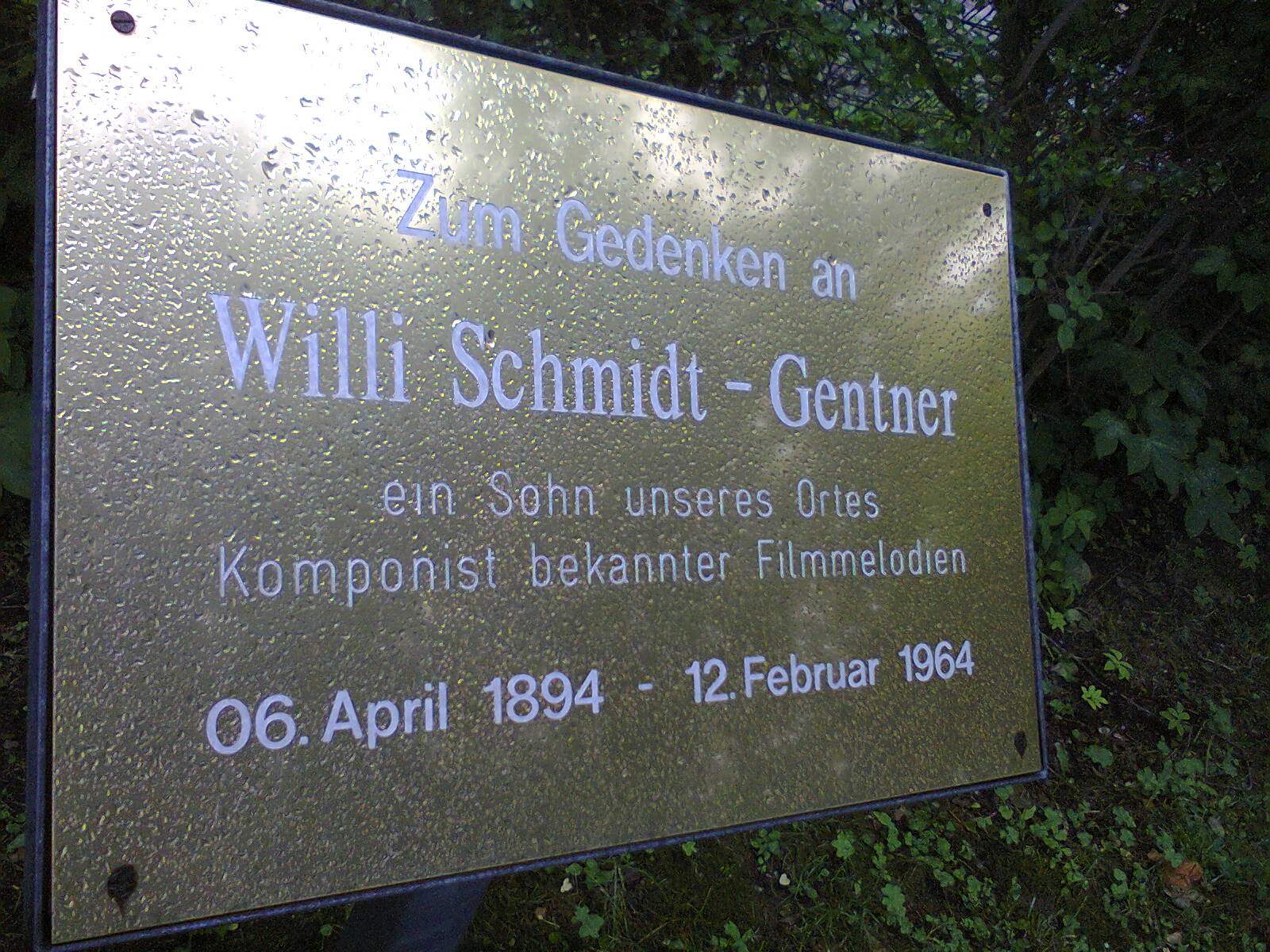
Memorial plaque for the filmmusic composer Genter in Neustadt am Rennsteig

Willy Schmidt-Gentner (6 April 1894 – 12 February 1964) was one of the most successful German composers of film music in the history of German-language cinema. He moved to Vienna in 1933. At his most productive, he scored up to 10 films a year, including numerous classics and masterpieces of the German and Austrian cinema.

== Life ==
Schmidt-Gentner was born in Neustadt am Rennsteig in Thuringia, Germany. During his childhood he learnt the violin and took lessons in composition from Max Reger. After World War I Schmidt-Gentner worked as a civil servant checking that cinema owners were paying their full taxes. Through one of his clients he got a position as a band leader at film theatre performances. This raised his interest in films and as early as 1922 he produced his first composition to accompany a silent film. He performed many of his new pieces himself on the piano during films. He was also already responsible at this period for the sound tracks of a number of German classic films, for example Alraune (1928), The White Hell of Pitz Palu (1929) and Hokuspokus (1930)

With the arrival of sound films he quickly became one of the most sought-after filmscore composers in Germany, so that for a time he was scoring up to 10 films a year. He had a preference for light comedies and cheerful musical romances, but occasionally he took on more heavyweight productions with political overtones, for example the National Socialist propaganda film Wien 1910 (1943) or the historical film Spionage (1955) about the k. u. k. spy Colonel Redl.

In 1933 he moved to Vienna, where he directed his only two films, Die Pompadour (1935) and Prater (1936), for the company Mondial-Film. For Sascha-Film he composed the music for some of the greatest specimens of the Wiener Film genre, among others Maskerade and Hohe Schule (both 1934). During this time he was romantically involved with Zsa Zsa Gabor. After the Anschluss (the annexation of Austria to Germany) he became the "house composer" for the National Socialist-owned Wien-Film, which had developed out of the former Sascha-Film. For them he scored not only their many escapist romantic comedies, but also some of their few overt propaganda films such as Heimkehr (1941), Wien 1910 (1942) or Das Herz muß schweigen (1944). He was also repeatedly commissioned by the top directors of wartime Vienna, Willi Forst and Gustav Ucicky, whom he already knew from previous work, to write scores for their productions, such as Der Postmeister (1940), Operette (1940), Wiener Blut (1942) and Wiener Mädeln (1943/1949).

After the end of the war Schmidt-Gentner remained loyal to Vienna and successfully continued his composing career for many more films, predominantly musicals set in Austria, until he retired in 1955. Altogether he composed the music for about 200 films. He died in Vienna on 12 February 1964.

== Selected filmography ==
A selection of films scored by Willy Schmidt-Gentner, with names of directors:

=== Silent films ===
- Nathan the Wise (Germany 1922, dir. Manfred Noa)
- Between Evening and Morning (Germany 1923, dir. Arthur Robison)
- I.N.R.I. (1923)
- The New Land (1924)
- By Order of Pompadour (1924)
- Carlos and Elisabeth (1924)
- The Voice of the Heart (1924)
- The Power of Darkness (Germany 1924, dir. Conrad Wiene)
- The Wife of Forty Years (1925)
- Living Buddhas (1925)
- If Only It Weren't Love (1925)
- The Adventures of Sybil Brent (1925)
- If You Have an Aunt (1925)
- Comedians (1925)
- The Blue Danube (Germany 1926, dir. Friedrich Zelnik)
- Madame Wants No Children (Germany 1926, dir. Alexander Korda)
- The Student of Prague (Germany 1926, dir. Henrik Galeen)
- The Red Mouse (Germany 1926, dir. Rudolf Meinert)
- The Mill at Sanssouci (1926)
- The Three Mannequins (1926)
- My Friend the Chauffeur (1926)
- The Violet Eater (1926)
- Derby (1926)
- Circus Romanelli (1926)
- State Attorney Jordan (1926)
- Fadette (1926)
- Children of No Importance (1926)
- Ghost Train (Germany/UK 1927, dir. Géza von Bolváry)
- Mata Hari (Germany 1927, dir. Friedrich Fehér)
- The Master of Nuremberg (1927)
- The Queen of Spades (1927)
- The Indiscreet Woman (1927)
- The Tragedy of a Lost Soul (1927)
- Nameless Woman (1927)
- The Woman Who Couldn't Say No (1927)
- Dancing Vienna (1927)
- The White Spider (1927)
- Attorney for the Heart (1927)
- The Weavers (1927)
- The Trousers (1927)
- Linden Lady on the Rhine (1927)
- Orient Express (Germany 1927, dir. Wilhelm Thiele)
- Prinz Louis Ferdinand (Germany 1927, dir. Hans Behrendt)
- Alraune (Germany 1928, dir. Henrik Galeen)
- Secrets of the Orient (1928)
- Charlotte Somewhat Crazy (1928)
- Prince or Clown (1928)
- Hurrah! I Live! (1928)
- Hungarian Rhapsody (1928)
- Who Invented Divorce? (1928)
- Casanova's Legacy (1928)
- The Model from Montparnasse (1929)
- Woman in the Moon (Germany 1929, dir. Fritz Lang)
- The White Hell of Pitz Palu (Germany 1929, dir. Arnold Fanck, G. W. Pabst)
- The Smuggler's Bride of Mallorca (Germany 1929)
- Napoleon at Saint Helena (Germany 1929)
- The Burning Heart (1929)
- Cyanide (Germany, 1930, dir. Hans Tintner)

=== Sound films ===
- Hocuspocus (Germany 1930, dir. Gustav Ucicky)
- The White Devil (1930)
- Darling of the Gods (1930)
- Dolly Gets Ahead (1930)
- The Flute Concert of Sanssouci (1930)
- Love's Carnival (1930)
- Wibbel the Tailor (1931)
- Everyone Asks for Erika (1931)
- Ash Wednesday (1931)
- That's All That Matters (1931)
- Marshal Forwards (1932)
- Companion Wanted (1932)
- Two in a Car (1932)
- The Song of Night (1932)
- A City Upside Down (1933)
- One Night's Song (1933)
- Her Highness the Saleswoman (1933)
- The Princess's Whim (1934)
- Frasquita (1934)
- Volga in Flames (1934)
- Tales from the Vienna Woods (1934)
- Gently My Songs Entreat (Germany/Austria 1934, dir. Willi Forst)
- Maskerade (Austria 1934, dir. Willi Forst)
- Tales from the Vienna Woods (Austria 1934, dir. Georg Jacoby)
- Hohe Schule (Austria 1934, dir. Erich Engel)
- Episode (Austria 1935, dir. Walter Reisch)
- ... nur ein Komödiant (Austria 1935, dir. Erich Engel)
- Asew (1935)
- Eva (1935)
- Blood Brothers (1935)
- The World's in Love (1935)
- The Cossack and the Nightingale (1935)
- The Divine Spark (1935)
- Thank You, Madame (1936)
- Rendezvous in Vienna (1936)
- The Emperor's Candlesticks (1936)
- His Daughter is Called Peter (1936)
- Premiere (Austria 1937)
- Darling of the Sailors (1937)
- Hotel Sacher (Germany 1939, dir. Erich Engel)
- Uproar in Damascus (Germany 1939, dir. Gustav Ucicky)
- A Mother's Love (Germany 1939, dir. Gustav Ucicky)
- Der Postmeister (Germany 1940, dir. Gustav Ucicky)
- Beloved Augustin (Germany 1940, dir. E. W. Emo)
- Operetta (Germany 1940, dir. Willi Forst, Karl Hartl)
- Heimkehr (Germany 1941, dir. Gustav Ucicky)
- Thrice Wed (1941)
- Brüderlein Fein (Germany 1942, dir. Hans Thimig)
- Wien 1910 (Germany 1942, dir. E. W. Emo)
- Vienna Blood (Germany 1942, dir. Willi Forst)
- Späte Liebe (Germany 1942, dir. Gustav Ucicky)
- Schrammeln (Germany 1943, dir. Géza von Bolváry)
- Late Love (1943)
- Laugh, Pagliacci (1943)
- Laugh Bajazzo (1943)
- The Heart Must Be Silent (Germany 1944, dir. Gustav Ucicky)
- Viennese Girls (Germany/Austria 1945/1949, dir. Willi Forst)
- Praterbuben (Austria 1946, dir. Paul Martin)
- Die Welt dreht sich verkehrt (Austria 1947, dir. J. A. Hübler-Kahla)
- Singende Engel (Austria 1947, dir. Gustav Ucicky)
- Fregola (1948)
- The Angel with the Trumpet (Austria 1948, dir. Karl Hartl)
- By a Nose (1949)
- Bonus on Death (1950)
- Der Schuß durchs Fenster (Austria 1950, dir. Siegfried Breuer)
- When the Evening Bells Ring (1951)
- The Lost One (1951)
- Archduke Johann's Great Love (1950)
- Vanished Melody (1952)
- Hannerl (1952)
- At the Well in Front of the Gate (1952)
- We'll Talk About Love Later (1953)
- When The Village Music Plays on Sunday Nights (1953)
- Cabaret (1954)
- The Faithful Hussar (1954)
- Emil and the Detectives (Germany 1954, dir. Robert A. Stemmle)
- Circus of Love (Germany/USA 1954, dir. Kurt Neumann)
- Walking Back into the Past (1954)
- Espionage (Austria 1955, dir. Franz Antel)
- Heimatland (Austria 1955, dir. Franz Antel)
- Kronprinz Rudolfs letzte Liebe (his last film; Austria 1955, dir. Rudolf Jugert)

== Sources/External links ==
- Filmportal.de: Willy Schmidt-Gentner (in German)
- Willy Schmidt-Gentner at IMDb
