= Oskar Strnad =

Austrian architect, sculptor and designer

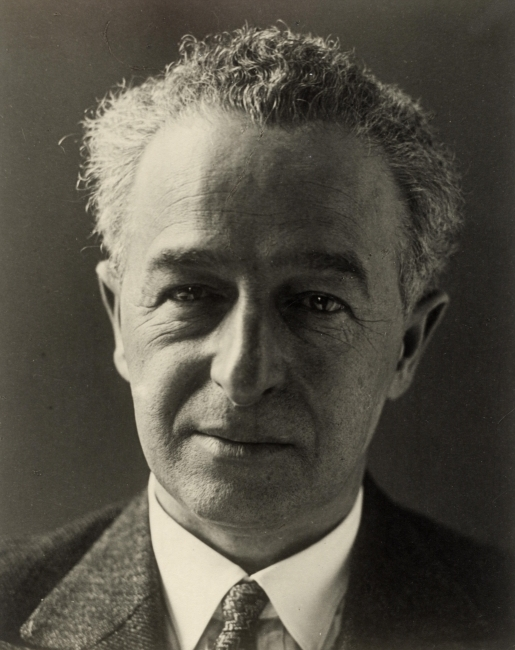
- Photography by Ludwig Schwab (1931)
- Born: October 26, 1879; Vienna, Austria-Hungary
- Died: September 3, 1935 (aged 55); Bad Aussee, Austria

Oskar Strnad (26 October 1879 – 3 September 1935) was an Austrian architect, sculptor, designer and set designer for films and theatres. Together with Josef Frank he was instrumental in creating the distinctive character of the Wiener Schule der Architektur ("Vienna School of Architecture"). He stood for a modern concept of "living" for all people, planned and built private dwelling-houses, designed furniture, created ceramics and watercolours and designed sets and props for stage plays and films.

== Biography ==
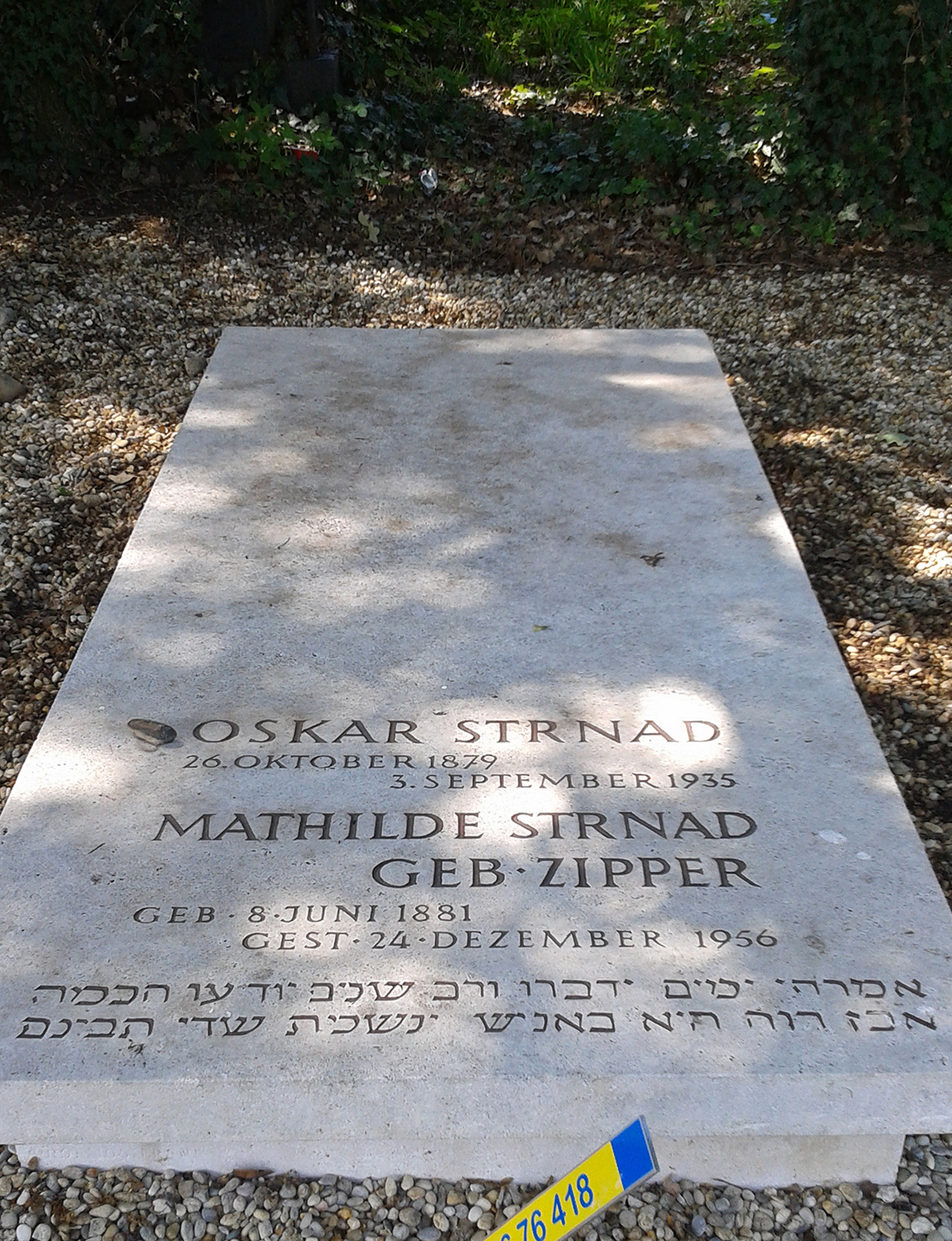
Grave of Strnad at Vienna Central Cemetery

Strnad was born in Vienna on 26 October 1879 into a family of Jewish descent. From 1909 to 1935 he was a professor in the Wiener Kunstgewerbeschule ("School of Applied Arts in Vienna") along with Josef Hoffmann. From 1918 he created designs for a "round theatre" (Rundtheater) in collaboration with his pupil Margarete Lihotzky (later Margarete Schütte-Lihotzky). Among his other pupils were the later film architects and set designers Artur Berger and Harry Horner. In 1923 Strnad constructed the Drei-Szenen-Theater ("three-scene-theatre"), a three-part stage within a circular auditorium.

From 1919 he was stage designer for the Wiener Volkstheater. Later Strnad designed many highly acclaimed sets for the Wiener Staatsoper, including sets for Berg's Wozzeck and for the premiere of Jonny spielt auf by Ernst Krenek. He also designed interiors for the lavish masterpieces of the "Wiener Film" such as Maskerade (1934) and Episode (1935).

He died in Bad Aussee on 3 September 1935.

== Works ==
- 1914 - The Austrian pavilion of the World Fair 1914 (Werkbund Exposition (1914)) (with Josef Hoffmann)
- 1925 - The Austrian pavilion of the Exposition Internationale des Arts Décoratifs et Industriels Modernes (1925) (with Josef Hoffmann)
- 1918 - "Rundtheater" (planned 1917)
- 1923 - Realisation of the "Drei-Szenen-Theater" (3-part stage and circular auditorium)
- 1926 - a theatre in Amsterdam
- 1932 - double house, now destroyed, in the Werkbundsiedlung Wien
- 1932 - house for ordinary people ("Volkshaus") in Wien 15, Holochergasse
- throughout his career, in Vienna and Lower Austria: numerous private houses and interior designs;
- throughout his career, in Austria: war graves and war memorials; chairs; decorative glass; sculptures; and so on
- in the Österreichisches Theatermuseum, Vienna: stage sets and costume designs (77 pieces).
