= Dora Komar =

Austrian dancer, actress and soprano

Dorothea Anna Chlotilde Komarek (18 April 1914 – 21 November 2006) was an Austrian dancer, actress and operatic soprano.

== Life ==
Born in Vienna, Dorothea Komarek performed in the children's ballet of the Vienna State Opera in her youth before making her adult debut as a professional dancer at the same venue in 1933. The State Opera engaged her, who had also enjoyed vocal training, as a singer two years later. She remained there until the closure of all theatres ordered by Goebbels due to the Total War Decree after the summer season had closed in 1944. Komar's best-known successes on stage are, among others, The Bartered Bride, the marriage of Figaro, the magic flute and Die Entführung aus dem Serail.

Komar was also a leading actress in feature films. Immediately following her brilliant debut alongside Willi Forst in the box-office hit Operetta, she was cast twice as Johannes Heesters's partner. (in Immer nur Du and Karneval der Liebe) and appeared in her last film role before the end of the war in the magnificent colour film Viennese Girls once again alongside Willi Forst, this time in Prague, a city largely spared by the war.

Komarek, married since 1941 to Somborn, emigrated in 1946 with her husband (since 1941), the Cologne lawyer and producer of the Forst Komar films Operetta and Wiener Mädeln Hans Somborn, and their three children to Rio de Janeiro, where Dora Komar continued her artistic activities. She gave recitals at the Theatro Municipal of Rio de Janeiro in the 1950s with works by Mozart, Strauss, Lehár and Schubert and guest performances of opera arias in Santiago de Chile, Buenos Aires and Montevideo.

The Somborn family returned to Austria in 1970. The couple often stayed in Portugal, where their youngest son lived. Hans Somborn died in Lisbon on 30 January 1993, his widow there on 21 November 2006 at the age of 92.

== Filmography ==
- 1940: Operetta
- 1941: Immer nur Du
- 1943: Carnival of Love
- 1943: Glück unterwegs
- 1945: Viennese Girls
