= I Can't Marry Them All =

1952 film

- Directed by: Hans Wolff
- Written by: Hans Fritz Beckmann; Willi Forst (idea); Franz Gribitz (book); Hans Wolff (book)
- Produced by: Werner Ludwig; Herbert Sennewald
- Starring: Sonja Ziemann; Adrian Hoven; Hardy Krüger
- Cinematography: Georg Bruckbauer; Willy Winterstein
- Edited by: Hermann Leitner
- Music by: Bert Grund; Peter Kreuder
- Production companies: Berolina Film; Fono Film
- Distributed by: J. Arthur Rank Film
- Release date: 5 September 1952
- Running time: 89 minutes
- Country: West Germany
- Language: German

I Can't Marry Them All (German: Alle kann ich nicht heiraten) is a 1952 West German musical comedy film directed by Hans Wolff and starring Sonja Ziemann, Adrian Hoven and Hardy Krüger. It was shot at the Wandsbek Studios in Hamburg and on location in the Swiss resort town of St. Moritz. The film's sets were designed by Rolf Zehetbauer.

== Cast ==
- Sonja Ziemann as Dschidschi
- Adrian Hoven as Fredi
- Hardy Krüger as Edi
- Joachim Brennecke as Ernst Vogel
- Marina Ried as Gaby
- Eva Maria Meineke as Rita
- Karin Andersen as Lilli
- Ernst Waldow as Hoteldirektor
- Hermann Pfeiffer as Schabransky
- Helmuth Rudolph as Dumont
- Walter Janssen as Alter Herr
- Harald Mannl as Konsul
- Luitgard Im as Emmi
- Dieter Schmidkunz

== Bibliography ==
- Hans-Michael Bock and Tim Bergfelder. The Concise Cinegraph: An Encyclopedia of German Cinema. Berghahn Books, 2009.
