= The Sinner (1951 film) =

1951 West German romantic drama film

- Directed by: Willi Forst
- Written by: Willi Forst; Georg Marischka; Gerhard Menzel
- Produced by: Rolf Meyer
- Starring: Hildegard Knef; Gustav Fröhlich; Änne Bruck
- Cinematography: Václav Vích
- Edited by: Max Brenner & Vadim Finneran
- Music by: Theo Mackeben
- Production company: Junge Film-Union Rolf Meyer
- Distributed by: Herzog Film
- Release date: 18 February 1951
- Running time: 100 minutes
- Country: West Germany
- Language: German

The Sinner (German: Die Sünderin) is a 1951 West German romantic drama film directed by Willi Forst, starring Hildegard Knef, Gustav Fröhlich and Änne Bruck. It was shot at the Bendestorf Studios and on location in Naples, Rome, and Positano. The film's sets were designed by the art director Franz Schroedter. Upon its release, it attracted significant attention, drawing two million viewers within the first three weeks, largely due to its controversial nature. However, after it became a less contentious subject, interest waned, and in the long run, it was not a financial success.

The film represented a major shift for the director, Forst, who had previously been known for escapist works such as Operette and Vienna Blood, which avoided controversial themes and embraced romanticized settings. The Sinner departed from this tradition by adopting a realist perspective, addressing taboo subjects like prostitution and euthanasia, which challenged the moral sensitivities of post-war West German society.

== Plot ==
The film is narrated by Marina in a series of flashbacks, describing her relationship with Alexander, an ailing artist. She grew up with her mother, stepfather, and stepbrother in a villa in Hamburg. Her stepfather despises the Nazis and becomes increasingly poor, moving the family into a small apartment. Her mother continues to wear expensive clothing and makeup, and disappears in the evening to meet unknown suitors. After her stepfather is arrested by the Gestapo, Marina is seduced by her stepbrother. The family breaks up soon after the stepfather is released and discovers his son's relationship with Marina. Her stepfather beats his son lifeless and throws Marina out on the street.

Marina begins to make a living collecting "gifts" from her suitors, and soon acquires and furnishes an apartment of her own in Munich as the war ends. While at a bar with a wealthy admirer, she sees Alexander for the first time, who is drunken and disheveled. The bar staff eject Alexander, who she takes pity on, and she brings him to her apartment. The two quickly fall in love and Alexander tells her he has a brain tumor that will soon cause him to go blind. She finds sleeping pills in his pocket, which he explains are so he can to commit suicide before the tumor causes him blindness and pain.

The two travel to Italy, where they experience happiness together, but the tumor begins to impact Alexander's vision. They return to Munich and Marina desperately tries to acquire money to finance a risky operation for Alexander, including by returning to the bar where she met Alexander. She instead finds the doctor who had diagnosed Alexander, who agrees to perform the operation for free. The operation restores his sight, and the couple moves to Vienna.

The period in Vienna is happy and highly productive for Alexander, who paints many nudes of Marina, and receives critical acclaim for his work. However, after a brief headache, he awakens to realize he has gone blind. As planned, Alexander takes an overdose of sleeping pills with champagne. Heartbroken, Marina also takes the sleeping pills, and the couple embrace on the sofa by the fireside.

== Controversy ==
Through its presentation of nudity, suicide, and euthanasia, the film’s debut sparked widespread contention in the tumultuous social climate of 1950s West Germany. Amid the focus on denazification and rebuilding, the public lacked a clear moral identity. Due to this dynamic, politicians and the Roman Catholic Church reacted negatively to the film, viewing it as exacerbating the already fragile moral fabric. During its initial screening in Regensburg, Catholic clergy opposing the film fomented riots, and screenings were disrupted by stink bombs, forcing the mayor to halt the screening due to a “threat to public health.” The widespread opposition culminated in unsuccessful calls for a ban of the film, which paradoxically gave it a prominent place in German film history. Despite the controversy, or perhaps because of it, The Sinner marked a turning point in Hildegard Knef’s career, after which she appeared in notable films such as the American-produced Decision Before Dawn and The Snows of Kilimanjaro.

== Cast ==
- Hildegard Knef as Marina
- Gustav Fröhlich as Alexander
- Änne Bruck as Marina's mother
- Wera Frydtberg as a colleague
- Robert Meyn as Marina's stepfather
- Jochen-Wolfgang Meyn as Marina's stepbrother
- Andreas Wolf as a doctor
