= Miracles Still Happen (1951 film) =

1951 film

- Directed by: Willi Forst
- Written by: Willi Forst; Johannes Mario Simmel
- Produced by: Rolf Meyer
- Starring: Willi Forst; Hildegard Knef; Marianne Wischmann
- Cinematography: Václav Vích
- Edited by: Rudolf Schaad
- Music by: Theo Mackeben
- Production company: Junge Film-Union Rolf Meyer
- Distributed by: Herzog Film
- Release date: 18 September 1951
- Running time: 90 minutes
- Country: West Germany
- Language: German

Miracles Still Happen (German: Es geschehen noch Wunder) is a 1951 West German romantic comedy film directed by Willi Forst and starring Forst, Hildegard Knef and Marianne Wischmann. It was intended by Forst as a less risqué follow-up to his controversial The Sinner which had also starred Knef. It was shot at the Bendestorf Studios and on location in Hamburg, Bavaria and Austria. The film's sets were designed by the art director Franz Schroedter and Karl Weber.

== Cast ==
- Hildegard Knef as Anita Weidner
- Willi Forst as Bobby Sanders
- Marianne Wischmann as Doris Meller
- Werner Fuetterer as Felix Schön
- Hans Leibelt as Prof. Nibius
- Lotte Klein as Konsulin
- Ilse Bally as Geistliche Schwester
- Else Reval as Wirtin
- Sepp Nigg as Wirt
- Hugo Gottschlich as Zöllner
- Theodor Danegger as Loisl
- Udo Loeptin as Tramp

== Bibliography ==
- Bock, Hans-Michael; Bergfelder, Tim, eds. (2009). The Concise Cinegraph: Encyclopaedia of German Cinema. New York: Berghahn Books. ISBN 978-1-57181-655-9.
