= Christl Mardayn =

Austrian actress and singer

Anna Christina Maria "Christl" Mardayn (8 December 1896 in Vienna – 24 July 1971) was an Austrian actress and singer.

== Life ==
Anna Christina Maria Mardayn was the daughter of banker Oskar Maria Mardayn and his wife Henriette (née Fusek). After graduation she studied piano, dance and song at the Academy of Music and Dramatic Arts in Vienna. In 1920, she made her stage debut in the role of a diseased soubrette in The Dead Eyes by Eugen d'Albert. As Christl Mardayn she subsequently received a firm contract to the Vienna Volksoper. She sang Cherubino in Le nozze di Figaro, Lola in Cavalleria rusticana, and Sieglinde in Die Walküre. She starred in the title role of Franz von Suppé's operetta Die schöne Galathee around 100 times.

In 1921, the soubrette moved to the Raimund Theater and in 1922 went to the Charles Theatre, where she sang in premiere performances of operettas such as Die Bajadere by Emmerich Kálmán, The Dragonfly Dance by Franz Lehár and The Lady in Ermine by Jean Gilbert. She toured to the Art Theatre in Berlin, the Corso Theatre in Zurich and the State Theatre in Hanover. She played the role of Madame Sans-Gêne by Victorien Sardou and Mirandolina by Bohuslav Martinů. Other guest appearances have taken her to Czechoslovakia, Hungary and Sweden. In the 1930s, Christl Madayn gradually transformed into a theater actress, increasingly in speaking roles. In 1932, she received an engagement at the Theater in der Josefstadt, and in 1934 she joined the German People's Theatre. She played mainly comedies by George Bernard Shaw and Molière.

Christl Mardayn married actor Hans Thimig in 1929. From 1939 to 1943 she was an ensemble member at the Theater in der Josefstadt and the Deutsches Theater in Berlin. Christl Mardayn continued to act after World War II in Vienna's theaters. She had remarried to businessman Paul Mühlbacher. She made rare film appearances during the 1950s. On 18 May 1957 she was awarded the Golden Medal for Merit by the Republic of Austria, On 21 March 1962, she was given the title of Professor. She taught at the Vienna Conservatory, and until her retirement at the Vienna Music Academy. Christl Mardayn died on 24 July 1971 from heart failure. She received an honorary grave dedicated to her at the Vienna's Central Cemetery (Group 40, Number 28).

== Filmography ==
- The Pride of Company Three (1932)
- The Young Baron Neuhaus (1934)
- … nur ein Komödiant (1935)
- The White Horse Inn (1935)
- Romance (1936)
- The Shanghai Drama (1938)
- The Leghorn Hat (1939)
- Stars of Variety (1939)
- Eine kleine Nachtmusik (1940)
- Gabriele Dambrone (1943)
- Romantische Brautfahrt (1943)
- Es fing so harmlos an (1944)
- Umwege zu Dir (1945)
- Wie ein Dieb in der Nacht (1945)
- Archduke Johann's Great Love (1950)
- One Night's Intoxication (1951)
- Das seltsame Leben des Herrn Bruggs (1951)
- Voices of Spring (1952)
- Praterherzen (1952)
- The Last Waltz (1953)
- Der Komödiant von Wien (1954)
- Victoria in Dover (1954)
- Marriage Sanitarium (1955)
- Bel Ami (1955)
- Immer wenn der Tag beginnt (1957)
