= Three Fathers for Anna =

1939 film directed by Carl Boese

- Directed by: Carl Boese
- Written by: Walther Kloepfer (novel); Gustav Kampendonk
- Produced by: Dietrich von Theobald
- Starring: Ilse Werner; Hans Stüwe; Theodor Danegger
- Cinematography: Werner Bohne
- Edited by: Hilde Grebner
- Music by: Hans Ebert
- Production company: UFA
- Distributed by: UFA
- Release date: 14 September 1939
- Running time: 87 minutes
- Country: Germany
- Language: German

Three Fathers for Anna (German: Drei Väter um Anna) is a 1939 German comedy film directed by Carl Boese and starring Ilse Werner, Hans Stüwe and Theodor Danegger. It was made by the German company UFA at the firm's Babelsberg Studios in Potsdam, with some location shooting taking place around Passau in Bavaria. The film's sets were designed by the art director Herbert Frohberg.

== Synopsis ==
A ship's doctor has a young woman placed in his care when her mother dies at sea. Her real father may be one of three men living in a rural Bavarian village as the girl's mother has been intentionally vague.

== Cast ==
- Ilse Werner as Anna
- Hans Stüwe as Dr. Bruck
- Theodor Danegger as Herr Ameiser
- Josefine Dora as Frau Ameiser
- Beppo Brem as Herr Fenzl
- Karel Stepanek as Matschek
- Roma Bahn as Donka
- Irmgard Hoffmann as Frau Fenzl
- Georg Vogelsang as Gsodmair
- Tonio Riedl as Martl
- Josefine Berger as Mareile
- Anneliese von Eschstruth as Gräfin Weißenfels
- Lothar Glathe as Schuckert, Matrose

== Bibliography ==
- Klaus, Ulrich J. Deutsche Tonfilme: Jahrgang 1939. Klaus-Archiv, 1988.
- Kreimeier, Klaus (1999). The Ufa Story: A History of Germany's Greatest Film Company, 1918–1945. University of California Press. ISBN 978-0-520-22069-0.
