= Without Witnesses =

- Directed by: Erwin Baron; Georg Kundert
- Starring: Grete Lundt; Fritz Kortner; Hans Siebert
- Production company: Leyka-Film
- Release date: 15 August 1919
- Country: Austria
- Languages: Silent; German intertitles

Without Witnesses (German: Ohne Zeugen) is a 1919 Austrian silent drama film directed by Erwin Baron and Georg Kundert and starring Grete Lundt, Fritz Kortner and Hans Siebert.

== Cast ==
- Grete Lundt
- Fritz Kortner
- Hans Siebert
- Erwin Baron
- Josef Reithofer
- Theodor Danegger
- Julius Strobl

== Bibliography ==
- Bock, Hans-Michael; Bergfelder, Tim (2009-09-01). The Concise Cinegraph: Encyclopaedia of German Cinema. Berghahn Books. ISBN 978-0-85745-565-9.
