= The Affairs of Maupassant =

- Directed by: Henry Koster
- Written by: Corrado Alvaro (Italian screenplay); Marie Bashkirtseff (book); Felix Jackson (story; as Felix Joachimson); Henry Koster (screenplay; as Hermann Kosterlitz); Fritz Rotter (story)
- Starring: Isa Miranda; Hans Jaray
- Cinematography: Willy Goldberger, Hans Heinz Theyer, Zoltan Vidor
- Edited by: Willy Zeunert, Ladislaus Vidor
- Music by: Paul Abraham
- Release date: 1935
- Running time: 77 minutes
- Languages: Italian; German

The Affairs of Maupassant is a 1935 Austrian-Italian drama film production. The German title is Das Tagebuch der Geliebten and the Italian title is Il diario di una donna amata, which means "the diary of a loved woman". An historical romance, it was directed by Henry Koster under his original name of Hermann Kosterlitz and starred Isa Miranda as the Ukrainian artist and diarist Marie Bashkirtseff and Hans Jaray as the French writer Guy de Maupassant. It was loosely based on Bashkirtseff's diaries, in which she records her studies in Paris to become an artist towards the end of the 19th century, and possibly on her correspondence with Maupassant, which she had begun under an assumed name. The film focuses on a feud between Maupassant and one of Bashkirtseff's teachers that leads to a nascent (and highly fictionalized) romance between Bashkirtseff and Maupassant. The romance is cut short in the film by Bashkirtseff's early death from tuberculosis. The film was made just before Koster moved to the United States to join Universal Studios. It was filmed in Vienna.

== Cast (Italian version) ==
- Isa Miranda as Marie Bashkirtseff
- Hans Jaray as Guy de Maupassant
- Ennio Cerlesi as Bassieux
- Loris Gizzi as Dr. Walitzky
- Gemma Bolognesi as Marie's Mothera

== Cast (Austrian version) ==
- Lili Darvas as Marie Bashkirtseff
- Hans Jaray as Guy de Maupassant
- Attila Hörbiger as Bassieux
- S.Z. Sakall as Dr. Walitzky (as Szöke Szakall)
- Anna Kallina as Marie's Mother
