= Die Fledermaus (1946 film) =

German operetta film

- DVD cover
- Directed by: Géza von Bolváry
- Written by: Richard Genée (libretto); Karl Haffner (libretto); Ernst Marischka
- Produced by: Alf Teichs; Viktor von Struwe
- Starring: Marte Harell; Johannes Heesters; Will Dohm
- Cinematography: Willy Winterstein
- Edited by: Alice Ludwig
- Music by: Alois Melichar; Johann Strauss (operetta)
- Production companies: Terra Film; DEFA
- Distributed by: Sovexport
- Release date: 16 August 1946
- Running time: 100 minutes
- Country: Germany
- Language: German

Die Fledermaus is a 1946 German operetta film directed by Géza von Bolváry and starring Marte Harell, Johannes Heesters, and Will Dohm. It is based on Johann Strauss II's 1874 work of the same name.

The film was made by Terra Film, one of major German production companies of the Nazi era. It was shot using agfacolor at the Barrandov Studios in Prague and the Babelsberg Studios in Berlin. Although production began in 1944, the film was not released until 1946 when it was distributed by the communist-controlled DEFA company in the Soviet occupation zone.

The film's sets were designed by Robert Herlth.

== Cast ==
- Marte Harell as Rosalinde Eisenstein
- Johannes Heesters as Herbert Eisenstein
- Will Dohm as Gefängnisdirektor Michel Falke
- Willy Fritsch as Warden Frank
- Joseph Egger as Frosch The Jailer
- Dorit Kreysler as Adele
- Hans Brausewetter as Melzer
- Siegfried Breuer as Prinz Orlowsky
- Mimi Stelzer as Cook at Eisensteins
- Heinz Salfner as Inspektor
- Franz Böheim as Office writer I.T. prison

== See also ==
- Überläufer

== Bibliography ==
- Bock, Hans-Michael; Bergfelder, Tim, eds. (2009). The Concise Cinegraph: Encyclopaedia of German Cinema. New York: Berghahn Books. ISBN 978-1-57181-655-9.
