= Willy Zeunert =

German film editor and production manager

- Born: 2 August 1882; Berlin, German Empire
- Died: 8 June 1969 (aged 86); West Berlin, West Germany
- Occupations: Editor, Production manager
- Years active: 1924–1948 (film)

Willy Zeunert (1882–1969) was a German film editor and production manager.

== Selected filmography ==
- Gentleman on Time (1924)
- The Daredevil (1931)
- The Secret of the Red Cat (1931)
- Thea Roland (1932)
- The Invisible Front (1932)
- Wedding at Lake Wolfgang (1933)
- A Woman with Power of Attorney (1934)
- What Am I Without You (1934)
- The Affairs of Maupassant (1935)
- Don't Lose Heart, Suzanne! (1935)
- Artist Love (1935)
- My Life for Maria Isabella (1935)
- Family Parade (1936)
- Shoulder Arms (1939)
- Six Days of Leave (1941)
- The Little Residence (1942)
- My Summer Companion (1943)
- The Wedding Hotel (1944)
- A Cheerful House (1944)

== Bibliography ==
- John T. Soister. Conrad Veidt on Screen: A Comprehensive Illustrated Filmography. McFarland, 2002.
