= Änne Bruck =

German actress (1907–1978)

- Born: 23 August 1907; Hamburg, Germany
- Died: 13 December 1978 (aged 71); Munich, West Germany
- Occupation: Actress
- Years active: 1936–1978

Änne Bruck (23 August 1907 – 13 December 1978) was a German actress. She appeared in more than 45 films and television shows between 1936 and 1978.

== Biography ==
Bruck began her acting career in films from 1936. She was on the Gottbegnadeten list of the Reich Ministry for Popular Enlightenment and Propaganda in 1944.

After the war, she also initially appeared in DEFA productions, such as "Der Mann, dem man den Namen stahl" (1945), directed by Wolfgang Staudte. In the scandalous film Die Sünderin (1951), she impersonated the mother of the leading actress Hildegard Knef. She also voiced numerous roles in radio drama productions. From the 1960s, she was increasingly active in television series. She was married to the actor Heinz Frölich until her death in 1978.

== Selected filmography ==
- Midsummer Night's Fire (1939)
- Commissioner Eyck (1940)
- The Millionaire (1947)
- Second Hand Destiny (1949)
- Unknown Sender (1950)
- Blondes for Export (1950)
- The Shadow of Herr Monitor (1950)
- Shadows in the Night (1950)
- The Sinner (1951)
- Cinderella (1955)
