= Don Juan in a Girls' School =

1928 film directed by Reinhold Schünzel

- Directed by: Reinhold Schünzel
- Written by: Heinz Gordon
- Based on: The Unfaithful Eckehart by Hans Sturm
- Produced by: Reinhold Schünzel
- Starring: Reinhold Schünzel
- Cinematography: Ludwig Lippert; Kurt Wunsch
- Production company: Reinhold Schünzel Film
- Distributed by: Süd-Film
- Release date: 7 September 1928
- Country: Germany
- Languages: Silent; German intertitles

Don Juan in a Girls' School (German: Don Juan in der Mädchenschule) is a 1928 German silent comedy film directed by and starring Reinhold Schünzel. It is based on Hans Sturm's play The Unfaithful Eckehart.

The film's art direction was by Gustav A. Knauer and Willy Schiller.

Two later film versions were The Unfaithful Eckehart (1931) and The Unfaithful Eckehart (1940).

== Cast ==
In alphabetical order

- Ernst Behmer as Studienrat Meisel
- Adolphe Engers as Fritz Stürmer
- Carl Geppert as Studienrat Schäden
- Else Groß as Mädchen für alles bei Susanne Bach
- Max Gülstorff as Oberstudienrat Arminius Niedlich
- Julius E. Herrmann as Sala Mander
- Carola Höhn
- Valerie Jones as Eva
- Maria Kamradek as Susanne Bach
- Lydia Potechina as Frau Tiedemann
- F. W. Schröder-Schrom
- Reinhold Schünzel as Dr. Eckehart Bleibtreu
- Lotte Stein as Perle im Hause Bleibtreu
- Jakob Tiedtke as Herr Tiedemann
- Rolf von Goth as Prinz Osram
- Hilde von Stolz as Trude
