= The Heavenly Waltz =

- German film poster
- German: Der himmlische Walzer
- Directed by: Géza von Cziffra
- Written by: Géza von Cziffra
- Produced by: Géza von Cziffra
- Starring: Elfie Mayerhofer; Paul Hubschmid; Inge Konradi
- Cinematography: Ludwig Berger
- Edited by: Henny Brünsch; Arnfried Heyne
- Music by: Alois Melichar
- Production company: Cziffra-Film
- Distributed by: Prisma Film; Bavaria Film (Germany)
- Release date: 25 February 1948
- Running time: 90 minutes
- Country: Austria
- Language: German

The Heavenly Waltz (German: Der himmlische Walzer) is a 1948 Austrian comedy film directed by Géza von Cziffra and starring Elfie Mayerhofer, Paul Hubschmid and Inge Konradi.

The film's sets were designed by the art director Fritz Jüptner-Jonstorff. It was shot at the Sievering Studios in Vienna.

== Cast ==
- Elfie Mayerhofer as Angelika, ein Engel auf Erden
- Paul Hubschmid as Hans Lieven
- Inge Konradi as Beate
- Curd Jürgens as Clemens M. Weidenauer
- Paul Kemp as Spaatz
- Gretl Schörg as Lillian Lord
- Petra Trautmann as Gaby
- Harry Fuß as Raphael
- Hans Olden as Director Haller
- Fritz Imhoff as Herditschka, Bühnenportier
- Theodor Danegger as Petrus
- Teddy Kern as assistant director Schmal
- Franz Böheim as autor
- Ernst Waldbrunn as dramaturge
- Peter Preses as the money man
- Karl Günther as director Weichel
- Friedl Loor as Susi
- Hilde Jaeger as secretary
- Erich Dörner as Seidl, Hausmeister
- Herbert Schill as Cäsar Martens, composer
- Viktor Gschmeidler as Film director
- Edith Meinel as Cäcilie
- Helga Dorn as Cherub
- Hans Kammauf as Director Thomas
- Inge Egger as a fat angel
- Jenny Liese as Aunt Hermine
