= Women Are No Angels =

1943 film

- Directed by: Willi Forst
- Written by: Géza von Cziffra
- Produced by: Willi Forst
- Starring: Marte Harell; Axel von Ambesser; Margot Hielscher; Curd Jürgens
- Cinematography: Jan Stallich; Hannes Staudinger
- Edited by: Hans Wolff
- Music by: Walter Leschititzky; Theo Mackeben
- Production company: Wien-Film
- Distributed by: Deutsche Filmvertriebs
- Release date: 23 March 1943
- Running time: 80 minutes
- Country: Germany
- Language: German

Women Are No Angels (German: Frauen sind keine Engel) is a 1943 German comedy film directed by Willi Forst and starring Marte Harell, Axel von Ambesser and Margot Hielscher. The film was made by Wien-Film in German-occupied Austria.

== Cast ==
- Marte Harell as Helga
- Axel von Ambesser as Richard Anden
- Margot Hielscher as Lola
- Curd Jürgens as Bandini
- Richard Romanowsky as Alfred Bolt
- Hedwig Bleibtreu as Frau Orla
- Alfred Neugebauer as Charles
- Petra Trautmann as Kitty
- Gretl Heinz as Bianca
- Angelo Ferrari
- Camilla Gerzhofer

== Bibliography ==
- Hake, Sabine. Popular Cinema of the Third Reich. University of Texas Press, 2001.
