= Carnival of Love =

1943 film

- Directed by: Paul Martin
- Written by: Walter Forster; Peter Groll; Paul Martin
- Produced by: Luggi Waldleitner
- Starring: Johannes Heesters; Dora Komar; Hans Moser
- Cinematography: István Eiben; Hugo O. Schulze
- Edited by: Gertrud Hinz-Nischwitz
- Music by: Michael Jary
- Production company: Berlin Film
- Distributed by: Deutsche Filmvertriebs
- Release date: 1 April 1943
- Running time: 96 minutes
- Country: Germany
- Language: German

Carnival of Love (German: Karneval der Liebe) is a 1943 German musical romantic comedy film directed by Paul Martin and starring Johannes Heesters, Dora Komar and Hans Moser. It was shot at the Althoff Studios and Babelsberg Studios in Berlin as well as the Hunnia Studios in Budapest, capital of Nazi Germany's wartime ally Hungary. Location shooting took place around Potsdam. The film's sets were designed by the art directors Heinrich Beisenherz and Alfred Bütow.

== Synopsis ==
Two divorced revue stars, Peter Hansen and Marina, are reunited for a show. Although Peter is engaged to the dancer Kitty, he is really still in love with Marina and manages to postpone his wedding. Meanwhile Marina, who also still has feelings for Peter, pretends to be getting married herself and hires a waiter to act as her fiancée.

== Cast ==
- Johannes Heesters as Tenor Peter Hansen
- Dora Komar as Marina Garden
- Hans Moser as Onkel Meierhofer
- Dorit Kreysler as Kitty, Tänzerin
- Axel von Ambesser as Pianist Frank
- Richard Romanowsky as Direktor Melchior Oberländer
- Gustav Waldau as Graf
- Evelyn Künneke as Tänzerin
- Ewald Wenck as 'Standesbeamter'
- Karl Hellmer as Straßenbahn-Schaffner
- Walter Steinweg as Inspizient
- Karl Alberti as Zimmerkellner
- Klaus Pohl as Gardrobier Wichmann
- Angelo Ferrari as Schlafwagenschaffner
- Tibor Halmay as Tibor, Kellner
- Friedrich Honna as Lakai

== Bibliography ==
- Klaus, Ulrich J. Deutsche Tonfilme: Jahrgang 1942. Klaus-Archiv, 1988.
- O'Brien, Mary-Elizabeth. Nazi Cinema as Enchantment: The Politics of Entertainment in the Third Reich. Camden House, 2006.
