= Archduke Johann's Great Love =

1950 film

- Directed by: Hans Schott-Schöbinger
- Written by: Hans Gustl Kernmayr (novel); Franz Gribitz; Friedrich Perkonig
- Produced by: Heinz-Joachim Ewert
- Starring: Marte Harell; O.W. Fischer; Christl Mardayn
- Cinematography: Günther Anders
- Edited by: Josefine Ramerstorfer
- Music by: Willy Schmidt-Gentner
- Production company: Patria-Filmkunst-Produktion
- Distributed by: Panorama-Film
- Release date: 3 December 1950
- Running time: 97 minutes
- Country: Austria
- Language: German

Archduke Johann's Great Love (German: Erzherzog Johanns große Liebe) is a 1950 Austrian historical romantic drama film directed by Hans Schott-Schöbinger and starring Marte Harell, O.W. Fischer and Christl Mardayn.

The film's sets were designed by the art directors Isabella Schlichting and Werner Schlichting.

== Synopsis ==
Following the end of the Napoleonic Wars, the more liberal-minded Habsburg Archduke John supports reforms in the Austrian Empire and German Confederation but is thwarted by machinations of the reactionary Klemens von Metternich. Things are complicated further when Archduke John falls in love with the commoner Anna Plochl and wishes to marry her.

== Cast ==
- Marte Harell as Anna Plochl
- O.W. Fischer as Erzherzog Johann
- Christl Mardayn as Kaiserin
- Josef Meinrad as Vertrauter des Erzherzogs
- Leopold Rudolf as Invalider Tiroler
- Albin Skoda as Fuerst Metternich
- Franz Pfaudler as Plochl, Posthalter von Aussee
- Franz Herterich as Kaiser Franz I.
- Oskar Sima as Armbrustschuetze
- Theodor Danegger as Diener
- Auguste Pünkösdy as Zofe

== Bibliography ==
- Fritsche, Maria. Homemade Men In Postwar Austrian Cinema: Nationhood, Genre and Masculinity . Berghahn Books, 2013.
- Von Dassanowsky, Robert. Austrian Cinema: A History. McFarland, 2005.
