= Maskerade (film) =

- Directed by: Willi Forst
- Written by: Willi Forst; Walter Reisch
- Produced by: Karl Julius Fritzsche
- Starring: Adolf Wohlbrück; Paula Wessely; Olga Chekhova
- Cinematography: Franz Planer
- Music by: Willy Schmidt-Gentner
- Distributed by: Sascha-Film
- Release date: 26 September 1934
- Running time: 90 minutes
- Country: Austria
- Language: German
- Budget: 863,539,45 Austrian schillings

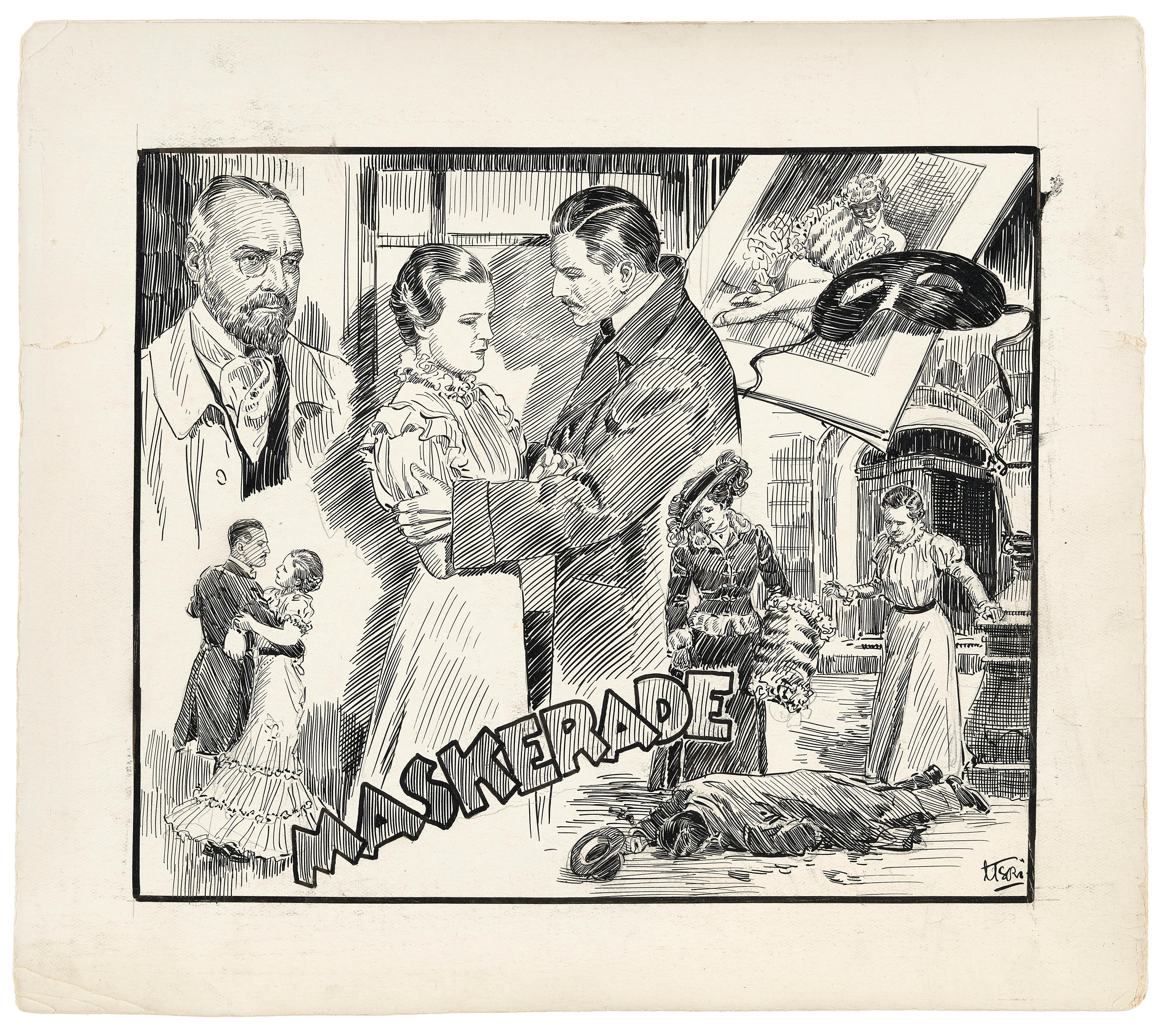
"Masquerade" ink drawing from a collection of the Hörbiger-Wessely family, circa 1935

Maskerade (also known as Maskerade in Wien, English: Masquerade or Masquerade in Vienna), is an Austrian operetta film, and a classic of German language cinema. The exceptional script of this, a great example of the genre of the Wiener Film, was by Walter Reisch and Willi Forst, who also directed. The German premiere was held in Berlin on 21 August 1934, followed by the Austrian premiere in Vienna on 26 September of the same year.

== Plot ==
The film is set in Viennese high society of about 1900. After a masked carnival ball, Gerda Harrandt (Hilde von Stolz), wife of the surgeon Carl Ludwig Harrandt (Peter Petersen), allows the fashionable artist Ferdinand Heideneck (Adolf Wohlbrück) to paint a portrait of her wearing only a mask and a muff. This muff however belongs to Anita Keller (Olga Chekhova), in secret the painter's lover but also the fiancée of the court orchestra director Paul Harrandt (Walter Janssen), the brother of Gerda's husband.

The picture is published in the newspaper. When Paul sees it and asks Heideneck some searching questions about the identity of the model, the artist is forced to improvise a story and on the spur of the moment invents a woman called Leopoldine Dur as the alleged model. Leopoldine Dur however turns out to be a real woman (Paula Wessely), whose acquaintance Heideneck makes shortly afterwards. This makes his lover Anita so jealous that she shoots him. He survives, and Leopoldine nurses him back to health. The true identity of the sitter in the portrait remains a mystery, however.

== Background ==
In February 1934, in the middle of the brief Austrian Civil War, Walter Reisch and Willi Forst wrote the screenplay of Maskerade in the Hotel Kranz-Ambassador in Vienna. Filming began in the same month in the Rosenhügel Film Studios of Sascha-Film. It was only the second film directed by Willi Forst, but is nevertheless one of his masterpieces. It was also the first film role for the distinguished stage actress Paula Wessely.

== Production ==
Since the microphones of the period were not very sensitive, they had to be brought as close to the performers as possible. Because of the visible shadows that the microphones would have cast under the intense lighting of the film sets they had to be hidden in many scenes behind all sorts of objects such as armchairs, bookshelves and vases. The actors had nevertheless to be constantly instructed to speak louder, which caused a number of problems in scenes in which by their nature it was necessary to speak quietly.

Essential to the visual success of the film was the contribution of the virtuoso of the film camera of 1930s Austria, Franz Planer, with his lively and beautifully lit compositions. The sets were the creation of Oskar Strnad, a great name of the contemporary Austrian art scene and lecturer at the School of Commercial Art (Wiener Kunstgewerbeschule, now the Universität für angewandte Kunst Wien), assisted by Emil Stepanek. Strnad's costume designs however were passed over by Forst in favour of those by Gerdago, whose dress for Paula Wessely contributed both to the success of the film and to Wessely's breakthrough into films.

Willy Schmidt-Gentner composed the score. The declared production costs were 863,539,45 Austrian schillings.

== Remakes ==
=== Escapade ===
Because of the film's great success it was remade in America in 1935 under the title Escapade.

=== Operetta ===
At the end of the 1970s, Reisch wrote an operetta based on the film of Maskerade with his cousin Georg Kreisler, who composed the music. (Robert Stolz had initially been commissioned for the music but died in 1975 aged 95, just after he had begun work on it). The premiere took place in 1983 during the Wiener Festwochen in the Theater in der Josefstadt under Kreisler's musical direction, and the piece ran for two seasons to packed houses; it has never been performed since. Reisch did not live to see it performed, as he fell ill and died in Los Angeles on 28 March 1983.

== Award ==
- Best Screenplay, Venice Film Festival 1934
