= ... nur ein Komödiant =

1935 film

- Spanish Film Poster
- Directed by: Erich Engel
- Written by: Wolfgang von Herter
- Produced by: Horus-Film
- Starring: Rudolf Forster; Paul Wegener; Christl Mardayn; Hans Moser
- Cinematography: Bruno Mondi
- Edited by: Else Baum
- Music by: Willy Schmidt-Gentner
- Distributed by: Syndikat-Film
- Release dates: 9 October 1935 (Germany); 10 January 1936 (Austria)
- Running time: 95 minutes
- Country: Austria
- Language: German

... nur ein Komödiant (also König der Maske; in English, ... just a Comedian, or King of the Mask) is an Austrian film of 1935. The director was Erich Engel. Temporarily in Vienna as a political emigrant from Germany, he wanted the film to make a statement against fascism and authoritarian government. Even so, the film passed the strict censors not only of the Third Reich but also of Austria, presumably because all political references were veiled by their setting in a royal court of the 18th century.

The premiere took place on 20 September 1935 in the Ufa-Palast in Hamburg. The film went on general release in Germany on 9 October 1935, opening in the Capitol in Berlin, and in Austria on 10 January 1936, opening in Vienna.

== Cast ==
- Rudolf Forster as Duke Karl Theodor von Schönburg / Florian Reuther, actor
- Paul Wegener as Minister von Creven
- Hans Moser as Melchior Pfennig
- Christl Mardayn as Beate von Dörnberg
- Babette Devrient-Reinhold as Imperial Countess Scharnitz, her aunt
- Hilde von Stolz as Countess Karola von Röderau
- Grit Haid as Minna, chambermaid
- Karl Paryla as Anton, her bridegroom
- Franz Schafheitlin as Blanchet, court painter
- Rudolf Carl as court astrologer
- Alfred Neugebauer as Master of Ceremonies
- Hans Waschatko as the Duke's secretary
- Lisl Kinast as Martha, actress
- Wilhelm König as Peter Tamm, actor
- Paul von Hernried as Velthen, actor
- Robert Valberg as the captain

== Plot ==
The young countess Beate von Dörnberg is travelling to Schönburg to the court of Duke Karl Theodor to take up residence as a lady in waiting. During an interruption in the journey while the coach is being repaired she gets to know two actors. The younger one is rather importunate, but the older one, Florian Reuther, tells her about the art of acting. The conversation is interrupted by the resumption of the journey, and the countess hopes to meet Reuther again.

Duke Theodor, to whose court she is travelling, is known to take no interest in the government of his state, and to leave all state business to Minister von Creven, who oppresses and exploits the people. After Countess Beatrice arrives at court, she is assigned as lady in waiting to the Countess von Röderau. At an evening party she attracts the attention of the Duke, who makes her an offer of marriage. Beate thus becomes his wife.

Florian Reuther's troupe of travelling actors arrives in Schönburg. During a discussion about the performance with Duke Karl Theodor, an attempt is made to press the young actor Peter Tamm into service in the army for the colonial wars of the Generalstaaten for which Minister von Creven has hired out Karl Theodor's army. Tamm attempts to escape but in the process falls from the fly loft onto the stage and is killed. Next day the Minister orders Florian to perform a certain piece. Florian has to call off the performance, as his principal actor is dead, for which he blames the Minister. This angers Von Creven, who strikes him in the face. Florian gets his own back at a masked ball, where he hits von Creven across the face with a riding crop. After this he is in danger, and is hidden by Beate, who has recognised him.

The climax of the film is the release by the people of the comedian Melchior, who had been put under arrest. Creven thereupon has the people rounded up and demands that they surrender whoever is responsible. When this does not happen, Creven orders his captain to shoot into the crowd. The Duke wants to prevent this, but cannot get through. But the captain refuses the order. Florian hears the ensuing argument and decides to intervene, dressed as the Duke, of whom he is an exact double, to order the crowd to disperse. In the role of the Duke he also orders the arrest of the Minister, who pulls out a pistol and shoots him. Florian makes it back to the chambers of Beate, in whose arms he dies. The real Duke is shocked into awareness by these events and resolves that Florian's sacrifice shall not be in vain. He promises to take the affairs of his state seriously from now on, in which Beate will support him.

== Background ==
Despite its anti-authoritarian plot this film, critical of fascism, was passed by both the German and Austrian censors, presumably because the period setting masked the contemporary relevance of the content. For example, the film contains a piece of dialogue in which the Minister insists that the Captain obey his order to shoot the 70 malcontented and rebellious subjects, which makes clear the contrast between dictatorship and humanitarianism:

Captain: I can't do that!
Minister: What is that supposed to mean? Captain, you heard my order!
Captain: I am not a murderer, I am an officer!
Minister: You were an officer!

The film is generally counted as an example of the genre of the Wiener Film, by virtue of its period setting and overall style, but its serious plot and contemporary political relevance make it much more heavyweight than the usual Wiener Filme, which are almost invariably light musical comedies.

== Production ==
The film was produced by the Horus-Film company of Vienna and filmed in the Sievering Studios and Rosenhügel Film Studios of Sascha-Film. The outdoor scenes were shot in Heiligenkreuz using the local inhabitants as extras.

The Tobis-Klangfilm sound system was used. The set designer was Julius von Borsody. When checked by the censors the film was 2,593 metres long. The German censors assessed the film on 2 September 1935 and declared the film unsuitable for minors. In Austria the film was declared "artistically noteworthy".

Distribution was carried out by Syndikat-Film, promotion by Tobis-Sascha-Filmindustrie.

== Sources ==
- Klaus, Ulrich J. (1995). Deutsche Tonfilme [German Sound Films] (in German). Vol. Band 6: Jahrgang 1935. Berlin: Klaus-Archiv. ISBN 978-3-927352-05-6.
