= Thrice Wed =

1941 film directed by Géza von Bolváry

- Directed by: Géza von Bolváry
- Written by: Hans Gustl Kernmayr; Ernst Marischka; Gerhard Menzel
- Produced by: Viktor von Struwe
- Starring: Willy Fritsch; Marte Harell; Theo Lingen
- Cinematography: Willy Winterstein
- Edited by: Arnfried Heyne
- Music by: Willy Schmidt-Gentner
- Production company: Wien Film
- Distributed by: Terra Film
- Release date: 24 June 1941
- Running time: 95 minutes
- Country: Germany
- Language: German

Thrice Wed (German: Dreimal Hochzeit) is a 1941 German romantic comedy film directed by Géza von Bolváry and starring Willy Fritsch, Marte Harell and Theo Lingen. The film was produced by Wien Film, a Vienna based-firm established following the Anschluss of 1938. It was shot at the city's Rosenhügel Studios. The film's sets were designed by the art directors Kurt Herlth and Werner Schlichting. It was distributed by Terra Film and premiered at the Gloria-Palast in Berlin. Due to its sympathetic portrayal of Russians, it was hastily withdrawn from German cinemas following the launch of Operation Barbarossa against the Soviet Union the same month.

== Synopsis ==
In Russia before the Revolution Prince Alexander, a nephew of the Tsar, falls in love with Vera. Because she is a commoner the social pressures of the Saint Petersburg elite compels her not to turn up for their wedding. In 1920 in Berlin with the two now émigrés, they meet again. Now he is working as a taxi driver and Vera is a famous singer. Again they make plans to marry, but this time it is the groom who backs out as he feels he can't wed her as an impoverished exile. Finally they encounter each other for a third time on an ocean liner where he is a bartender and she a model. Feeling that social distinctions no longer matter, they at last marry on the third attempt.

== Cast ==
- Willy Fritsch as Fürst Alexander Woronin
- Marte Harell as Vera Petrowna
- Theo Lingen as Felix
- Hermann Brix as Leutnant Tatarinoff
- Hedwig Bleibtreu as Herzogin Tatjana
- Theodor Danegger as Fürst Paul
- Alfred Neugebauer as Fürst Gregor
- Hans Zesch-Ballot as Rittmeister Graf Lievers
- Erik Frey as Oberleutnant Raswjenko
- Ernst Bader as Leutnant Mischa
- Nicolas Koline as Verwalter Stepan
- Rosa Albach-Retty as Tante Nastja
- Leo Peukert as Kommerzienrat Knopp
- Franz Herterich as Großfürst
- Richard Eybner as Haushofmeister
- Franz Böheim as Ivan
- Catharina Reichert as Tante Olga
- Fritz Imhoff as Herr Schmid

== Bibliography ==
- Hull, David Stewart. Film in the Third Reich: A Study of the German Cinema, 1933–1945. University of California Press, 1969.
- Von Dassanowsky, Robert. Austrian Cinema: A History. McFarland, 2005.
