= Helmuth Rudolph =

German actor

Helmuth Rudolph (1900–1971) was a German actor.

== Selected filmography ==
- So Ended a Great Love (1934)
- The Last Waltz (1934)
- Back in the Country (1936)
- Blum Affair (1948)
- Blocked Signals (1948)
- Love '47 (1949)
- The Prisoner (1949)
- Don't Dream, Annette (1949)
- Amico (1949)
- Good Fortune in Ohio (1950)
- The Man Who Wanted to Live Twice (1950)
- The Dubarry (1951)
- The Csardas Princess (1951)
- The Lost One (1951)
- I Can't Marry Them All (1952)
- Fight of the Tertia (1952)
- It Was Always So Nice With You (1954)
- The Telephone Operator (1954)
- Alibi (1955)
- The Story of Anastasia (1956)
- Devil in Silk (1956)
- My Father, the Actor (1956)
- Charley's Aunt (1956)
- Wir Wunderkinder (1958)
- Murderers Club of Brooklyn (1967)
