= Theodor Danegger =

Austrian actor

- Born: 31 August 1891; Lienz, Austria
- Died: 11 October 1959 (aged 68); Vienna, Austria
- Occupation: Actor
- Years active: 1919–1959
- Relatives: Mathilde Danegger (sister)

Theodor Danegger (31 August 1891 – 11 October 1959) was an Austrian film actor. He appeared in more than 70 films between 1932 and 1959. He was born in Lienz, Austria and died in Vienna, Austria.

== Filmography ==
| Year | Title | Role | Notes |
|---|---|---|---|
| 1919 | Without Witnesses | | |
| 1932 | You Don't Forget Such a Girl | Hausportier | |
| 1933 | Voices of Spring | | |
| 1935 | Marriage Strike | Bartl, sein Vater | |
| 1935 | The Royal Waltz | Ludwig Tomasoni, Cafetier | |
| 1936 | Women's Regiment | Korbinian, Faktotum | |
| 1939 | Spaßvögel | Lämmle | |
| 1939 | A Hopeless Case | Gotthelf Matthias | |
| 1939 | Three Fathers for Anna | Herr Ameiser | |
| 1939 | Maria Ilona | Anton | |
| 1939 | Opernball | Baron Eduard von Lamberg | Uncredited |
| 1940 | Bal paré | Briefträger Florian Brunnhuber | |
| 1940 | My Daughter Lives in Vienna | Margas Vater Theo Gerlach | |
| 1940 | Ein Leben lang | Fritz, Kellner | |
| 1940 | Roses in Tyrol | Fürst Heinrich Dagobert von Lichtenberg | |
| 1940 | Operetta | Tundler | |
| 1941 | Hochzeitsnacht | Kleefass | |
| 1941 | Love is Duty Free | | |
| 1941 | Thrice Wed | Fürst Paul | |
| 1941 | Immer nur Du | Theaterdirektor Knopp | |
| 1941 | The Waitress Anna | Orgelbauer | |
| 1941 | Wir bitten zum Tanz | Hartenau | |
| 1941 | Illusion | Jacob | |
| 1942 | Much Ado About Nixi | Gemüsehändler | |
| 1942 | Drei tolle Mädels | Klaus | |
| 1942 | Die heimliche Gräfin | Hausgenoss | |
| 1942 | Der große Schatten | Hugo, Diener | |
| 1942 | Whom the Gods Love | | |
| 1942 | Dove andiamo, signora? | Il presidente | |
| 1943 | Abenteuer im Grandhotel | President Ottokar Frühwirt | |
| 1943 | Das Ferienkind | | |
| 1943 | Die kluge Marianne | Pankraz | |
| 1943 | Die Gattin | Pfandleiher | |
| 1943 | The White Dream | Onkel Strolz | (deleted scenes) |
| 1944 | Music in Salzburg | Portier Schöberl | |
| 1946 | Glaube an mich | Würfel, Portier | |
| 1947 | Die Welt dreht sich verkehrt | Polizeirat v. Creutzinger | |
| 1947 | Triumph der Liebe | Diogenes | |
| 1947 | The Singing House | Direktor Hofer | |
| 1948 | Rendezvous im Salzkammergut | Franzl | |
| 1948 | Alles Lüge | Melchior Folkner | |
| 1948 | Kleine Melodie aus Wien | Kayser sen., ein Musikverleger | |
| 1948 | The Mozart Story | Deinert | |
| 1948 | The Heavenly Waltz | Petrus | |
| 1948 | Die Schatztruhe | Aloys Pirker | |
| 1948 | Fregola | Boulanger | |
| 1949 | Du bist nicht allein | Clemens | |
| 1949 | Es lebe das Leben | Direktor Huber | |
| 1949 | Kätchen für alles | Anton | |
| 1949 | The Murder Trial of Doctor Jordan | Vater Jordan | |
| 1949 | The Blue Straw Hat | Kellner Franz | |
| 1950 | Royal Children | Hubertus, Herzog von Lauenstein | |
| 1950 | Kissing Is No Sin | | |
| 1950 | Archduke Johann's Great Love | Diener | |
| 1951 | Miracles Still Happen | Loisl | |
| 1952 | My Friend the Thief | Franz | |
| 1952 | The Mine Foreman | Hofkammeradjunkt Pötzl | |
| 1952 | 1. April 2000 | Russ. Hochkommissar | |
| 1953 | Drei, von denen man spricht | Opa | |
| 1953 | If I Only Have Your Love | | |
| 1954 | König der Manege | Charles Belleroy, Musikpädagoge und Manager | |
| 1955 | The Blue Danube | Chauffeur Jean | |
| 1955 | Her First Date | Kellner im Lokal 'Capri' | |
| 1955 | Hanussen | | |
| 1955 | The Royal Waltz | Ober Alois | |
| 1956 | Pulverschnee nach Übersee | Vinzenz Feuchtl | |
| 1956 | Lumpazivagabundus | | |
| 1957 | Salzburg Stories | Kellner | |
| 1957 | Wie schön, daß es dich gibt | | |
| 1957 | The Twins from Zillertal | Gschwandtner | |
| 1957 | The Count of Luxemburg | Großfürst Michail Michailowitsch | |
| 1957 | Almenrausch and Edelweiss | Hotelportier Xandl | |
| 1958 | Der Sündenbock von Spatzenhausen | Blasius | |
| 1958 | My Sweetheart Is from Tyrol | Alter Baron | |
| 1959 | A Doctor of Conviction | Friedrich, Pförtner im Krankenhaus | (final film role) |
