= Viktor von Struwe =

German film producer

- Born: 2 November 1892; Riga, Governorate of Livonia, Russian Empire
- Died: 4 January 1964 (aged 71); Wiesbaden, West Germany
- Occupation: Producer
- Years active: 1932-1955 (film)

Viktor von Struwe (2 November 1892 – 4 January 1964) was a Baltic German film producer. He also worked as an assistant director on four films. He is sometimes credited as Viktor von Struve.

== Selected filmography ==
- Police Report (1939)
- Maria Ilona (1939)
- Opera Ball (1939)
- Roses in Tyrol (1940)
- The Waitress Anna (1941)
- Thrice Wed (1941)
- Andreas Schlüter (1942)
- A Man with Principles? (1943)
- The Enchanted Day (1944)
- Die Fledermaus (1946)
- The Other Life (1948)
- My Wife Is Being Stupid (1952)
- Roses from the South (1954)
- The Spanish Fly (1955)

== Bibliography ==
- Armin Loacker. Im Wechselspiel: Paula Wessely und der Film. Verlag Filmarchiv Austria, 2007.
- Weniger, Kay (2001). Das große Personenlexikon des Films: die Schauspieler, Regisseure, Kameraleute, Produzenten, Komponisten, Drehbuchautoren, Filmarchitekten, Ausstatter, Kostümbildner, Cutter, Tontechniker, Maskenbildner und Special Effects Designer des 20. Jahrhunderts. Berlin: Schwarzkopf & Schwarzkopf. ISBN 978-3-89602-340-7.
