= Operetta (film) =

1940 film

- Directed by: Willi Forst
- Written by: Axel Eggebrecht; Willi Forst
- Produced by: Karl Hartl; Willi Forst
- Starring: Willi Forst; Maria Holst; Dora Komar; Paul Hörbiger
- Cinematography: Hans Schneeberger
- Edited by: Hans Wolff
- Music by: Willy Schmidt-Gentner
- Production company: Wien-Film
- Release date: 20 December 1940
- Running time: 100 minutes
- Country: Nazi Germany
- Language: German
- Budget: 2,100,000 RM (equivalent to €9,294,900 in 2021)
- Box office: 5,000,000 RM (equivalent to €22,130,715 in 2021)

Operetta (German: Operette) is a 1940 German musical film directed by Willi Forst and starring Forst, Maria Holst and Dora Komar. The film was made by Wien-Film, a Vienna-based company set up after Austria had been incorporated into Greater Germany following the 1938 Anschluss. It is the first film in director Willi Forst's "Viennese Trilogy" followed by Vienna Blood (1942) and Viennese Girls (1945). The film portrays the life of Franz Jauner (1832–1900), a leading musical figure in the city. It is both an operetta film and a Wiener Film.

== Cast ==
- Willi Forst as Franz Jauner
- Maria Holst as Marie Geistinger
- Dora Komar as Emmi Krall, Jauner's wife
- Paul Hörbiger as Alexander Girardi
- Leo Slezak as Franz von Suppé
- Edmund Schellhammer as Johann Strauss II
- Curd Jürgens as Karl Millöcker
- Siegfried Breuer as Fürst Hohenburg
- Gustav Waldau as Ferdinand, Emmi's teacher
- Theodor Danegger as Tundler
- Trude Marlen as Antonie Link
- Viktor Heim as Hans Makart
- Alfred Neugebauer as Count Esterhazy
- Heinz Woester as Prof. Dr. Eichgraber
- Ferdinand Mayerhofer as Dr. Molzer, lawyer
- Gisa Wurm as Frau Bramezberger
- Wilhelm Leicht as theatre director in Krems
- Fred Hülgerth as tenor Czika
- Lia Bayer
- Franz Borsos
- Lorenz Corvinus
- Hans Fetscherin
- Pepi Glöckner-Kramer
- Hansi Koller
- Hill Larsen
- Klaus Pohl
- Oskar Pouché
- Ernst Reitter
- Johannes Roth
- Louis Soldan
- Josef Stiegler
- Agnes Tassopulos
- Oskar Wegrostek

== Bibliography ==
- Hake, Sabine. Popular Cinema of the Third Reich. University of Texas Press, 2001.
