= Gentleman on Time =

1924 film

- Directed by: Karl Gerhardt
- Written by: Paul Rosenhayn
- Produced by: Willy Zeunert
- Starring: Carlo Aldini
- Cinematography: Carl Drews
- Production company: Phoebus Film
- Distributed by: Phoebus Film
- Release date: 10 June 1924
- Country: Germany
- Language: cGerman

Gentleman on Time (German: Gentleman auf Zeit) is a 1924 German silent film directed by Karl Gerhardt and starring Carlo Aldini.

The film's sets were designed by the art director Willi Herrmann.

== Cast ==
In alphabetical order

- Carlo Aldini
- Kurt Brenkendorf
- Oswald Delmor
- Mario Fossati
- Fred Goebel
- Albert Patry
- Grete Reinwald
- Josef Reithofer
- Nicolai von Roessel
- Willy Zeunert
