= It Was Always So Nice With You =

1954 film

- Directed by: Hans Wolff
- Written by: Hans Rameau; Hans Wolff
- Starring: Heinz Drache; Georg Thomalla; Ingrid Stenn; Grethe Weiser
- Cinematography: Hans Schneeberger
- Edited by: Hermann Leitner
- Music by: Georg Haentzschel
- Production company: Fono Film
- Distributed by: Allianz Filmverleih
- Release date: 16 March 1954
- Running time: 90 minutes
- Country: West Germany
- Language: German

It Was Always So Nice With You (German: Bei Dir war es immer so schön) is a 1954 West German musical comedy film directed by Hans Wolff and starring Heinz Drache, Georg Thomalla and Ingrid Stenn. The Swedish actress Zarah Leander who had been the leading German film star during the Nazi era, plays a self-referential role as a maturing film star. The film was intended as a tribute to the composer Theo Mackeben with many of his hit songs sung by Leander and Kirsten Heiberg, another star of the 1940s.

It was shot at the Wandsbek Studios in Hamburg. The film's sets were designed by the art director Rolf Zehetbauer.

== Cast ==
- Heinz Drache as Peter Martens
- Georg Thomalla as Karl Holler
- Ingrid Stenn as Elisabeth
- Grethe Weiser as Aunt Martha
- Albrecht Schoenhals as Publisher Conrads
- Carsta Löck as Secretary
- Willy Maertens as Father Hannemann
- Helmuth Rudolph as 2nd Film Director
- Robert Kersten as Filmstar
- Willi Forst as Film Director
- Kirsten Heiberg as Cabarre Singer
- Margot Hielscher as Revue Star
- Zarah Leander as Filmstar
- Sonja Ziemann as Ballett Dancer
- Grete Sellier as Dancer
- Willy Dirtl as Dancer
- Erwin Bredow as Dancer
- Arthur Bankmann as Dancer
- Helmut Ketels as Dancer
- I.P. Schaich as Dancer
- Klaus Zimmermann as Dancer
- Eddi Arent as Peters Begleiter in Hafenbar

== Bibliography ==
- Anne Commire & Deborah Klezmer. Women in World History: A Biographical Encyclopedia, Volume 9. Yorkin Publications, 1999.
