= Gabriele Dambrone =

1943 film directed by Hans Steinhoff

- Directed by: Hans Steinhoff
- Written by: Richard Billinger (play); Per Schwenzen; Hans Steinhoff
- Starring: Gusti Huber; Siegfried Breuer; Christl Mardayn
- Cinematography: Richard Angst
- Edited by: Hans Domnick
- Music by: Michael Jary
- Production company: Terra Film
- Distributed by: Deutsche Filmvertriebs
- Release date: 11 November 1943
- Running time: 101 minutes
- Country: Germany
- Language: German

Gabriele Dambrone is a 1943 German drama film directed by Hans Steinhoff and starring Gusti Huber, Siegfried Breuer and Christl Mardayn. It was shot at the Babelsberg Studios in Berlin. Location shooting took place in Vienna and Tyrol. This was an expensive production with a budget of 1,627,000 Reichsmarks. The film was a popular success at the box office.

== Cast ==
- Gusti Huber as Gabi
- Siegfried Breuer as Paul Madina
- Christl Mardayn as Inge Madina
- Ewald Balser as Georg Hollberg
- Eugen Klöpfer as Gotthart
- Theodor Loos as Dr. Christopher
- Fritz Kampers as Prof. Muhry
- Annie Rosar as Frau Lauch
- Ágnes Eszterházy as Madame Yvonne
- Käthe Dobbs as Komtesse Clementine
- Maria Hofen as Walpurga
- Pepi Glöckner-Kramer as Frau Greinert
- Egon von Jordan as Stefan von Hamsa
- Alexander Trojan as Franz Lauch
- Karl Etlinger as Anton
- Georg Vogelsang as Anzelm
- Edelweiß Malchin as Mizzy
- Renate Honsig as Ludmilla Lauch
- Frieda Niederhofer as Josefa Platt
- Jenny Liese as Frl. Windweiser
- Maria von Höslin as Pia
- Lotte Martens as Olly
- Erika Helldorf as Karoline
- Friedel Hoffmann as Erna

== Bibliography ==
- Rentschler, Eric. The Ministry of Illusion: Nazi Cinema and Its Afterlife. Harvard University Press, 1996.
