= Hilde von Stolz =

Austrian-German actress (1903–1973)

- Born: 8 July 1903; Schäßburg, Austro-Hungarian Empire
- Died: 16 December 1973 (aged 70); West Berlin, West Germany
- Other name: Helen Steels
- Occupation: Actress
- Years active: 1928–1967 (film)

Hilde von Stolz (8 July 1903 in Segesvár, Nagy-Küküllő County, Austria-Hungary, now Romania – 16 December 1973 in West Berlin, West Germany) was an Austrian-German actress.

Von Stolz attended the Max Reinhardt Seminar in Vienna and made her debut at the local Kammerspielen. She subsequently performed at various theaters in Vienna and in the Theater am Schiffbauerdamm in Berlin.

She made her debut in film in 1928 under the pseudonym "Helen Steels". That same year, she moved to Berlin. In her second film role, she played the lead role opposite Reinhold Schünzel in Don Juan in a Girls' School. Von Stolz began performing under her real name starting in 1933. She established herself as a major film actress although she had to be satisfied with major supporting roles that usually portrayed elegant ladies and femmes fatales such as the actress Lydia Link in The Dreamer.

Von Stolz had planned to emigrate from Germany but the outbreak of the Second World War in 1939 frustrated those plans. During the war she worked in a number of Nazi propaganda films, the most widely known of these was her role as the wife of Duke Karl Alexander in Veit Harlan's Jud Süß (1940). After the war, she acted only rarely in films.

After her death in 1973, she was buried in the family vault.

== Filmography ==
- Der Schulmeister vom Lichtenthal (1928) as Unknown role
- Don Juan in a Girls' School (1928) as Trude
- The Three Women of Urban Hell (1928) as Anuschka
- Heilige oder Dirne (1929) as Therese
- People in the Fire (1930) as Unknown role
- What Price Love? (1930) as Denise
- Troika (1930) as Natascha
- A Storm Over Zakopane (1931) as the paralytic young woman
- The Soaring Maiden (1931) as Else Brandt
- Life Begins Tomorrow (1933) as Marie
- Mit Dir durch dick und dünn (1933) as Luise
- My Heart Calls You (1934) as Vera Valetti
- Maskerade (1934) as Gerda Harrandt
- Achtung! Wer kennt diese Frau? (1934) as Komtesse Ilona von Teröcky
- The Gentleman Without a Residence (1934) as Mrs. Mangold
- Asew (1935) as Nelly
- ... Just a comedian (1935) as Countess Karola von Röderau
- Es flüstert die Liebe (1935) as Madame Cochard
- The Love of the Maharaja (1935) as Daisy Atkins
- The Dreamer (1936) as Lydia Link
- Stronger Than Regulations (1936) as Mrs. Lörik
- The Adventurer of Paris (1936) as Lucienne Renard
- Girls in White (1936) as Natalia the dancer
- Der Weg des Herzens / Prater (1936) as Valerie - Freds Schwester
- Sein letztes Modell (1936) as Klari, Konzetagentin
- Sister Maria (1937) as Halmay Klári
- Krach und Glück um Künnemann (1937) as Lady Elvira
- The Glass Ball (1937) as Nina Sylten
- When Women Keep Silent (1937) as Mira Mirella
- To New Shores (1937) as Fanny Hoyer
- Frühlingsluft (1938) as Vera Naldi
- Scheidungsreise (1938) as Ly Tomaczek - Privatdetektivin
- Kleiner Mann – ganz groß (1938) as Frau Tschoppe
- Castles in the Air (1939) as the singer
- The Fire Devil (1939) as Marquise Antoinette de Chanel
- Herz geht vor Anker (1940) as Rita Reitzenberg
- Jud Süß (1940) as Duke Karl Alexander's wife
- The Way to Freedom (1941) as Melanie
- Tanz mit dem Kaiser (1941) as Gräfin Daun
- Front Theatre (1942) as Edith Reiß
- With the Eyes of a Woman (1942) as Cora Solani
- Diesel (1942) as Mrs. von Lorrenz
- Münchhausen (1943) as Louise La Tour
- Die Gattin (1943) as Helene, Peters Freundin
- Die schwache Stunde (1943) as Marions Mutter Leonore
- Glück unterwegs (1944) as Unknown role
- Es lebe die Liebe (1944) as Alice
- Ich glaube an Dich (1945) as Unknown role
- Freunde (1945) as Valerie
- Marriage in the Shadows (1947) as Greta Koch
- Love is Forever (1954) as Die Elster
- The Great Test (1954) as Mrs. Ermer
- Charley's Aunt (1956) as the Consul general's wife
- The Trapp Family (1956) as Baroness Mathilde
- Die Christel von der Post (1956) as Anni Klewinski
- Es war die erste Liebe (1958) as Frau Harms
- The Beggar Student (1961, TV film) as Amalia
- Tolles Geld (1964, TV film) as Nadeschda Tscheboksarowa
