= Hedwig Bleibtreu =

Austrian actress (1868–1958)

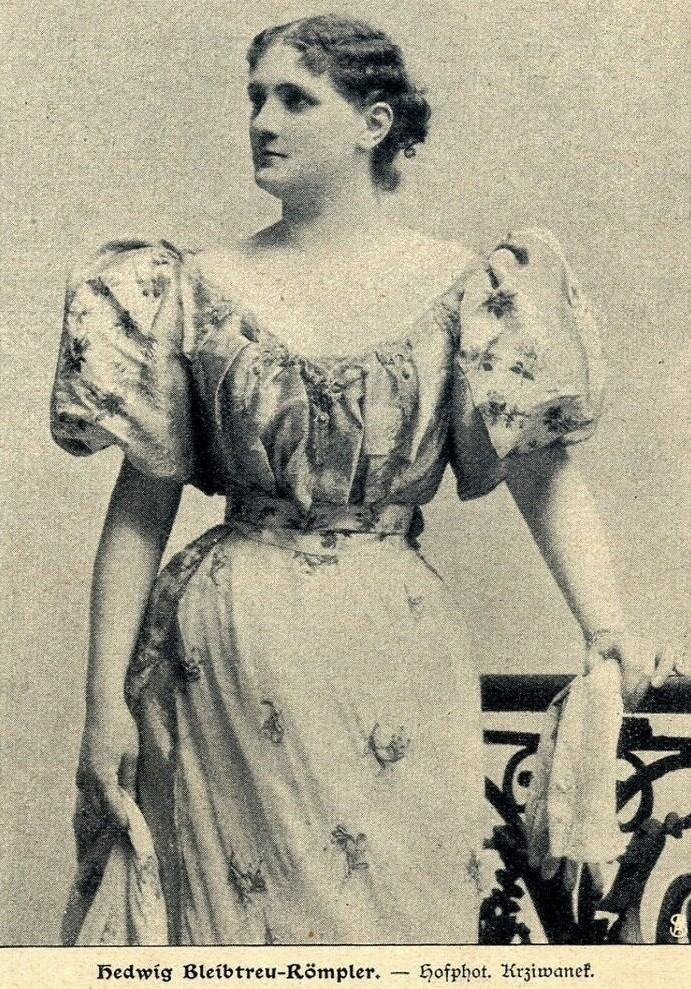
- Bleibtreu in 1905
- Born: 23 December 1868; Linz, Austro-Hungarian Empire
- Died: 24 January 1958 (aged 89); Vienna, Austria
- Occupation: Actress
- Years active: 1893-1956

Hedwig Bleibtreu (German pronunciation: [ˈheːtvɪç ˈblaɪptʁɔʏ, -vɪk -]; 23 December 1868 – 24 January 1958) was an Austrian film actress. She appeared in more than thirty films from 1919 to 1952. Bleibtreu is perhaps best known to international audiences as Alida Valli's furious landlady in Carol Reed's 1949 film The Third Man. From 1893 to 1956, she played at the Burgtheater in Vienna. She was married to the actor and theatre director Peter Petersen. Hedwig Bleibtreu is the great-aunt of actress Monica Bleibtreu, and the great-great-aunt of Monica's son actor Moritz Bleibtreu.

== Filmography ==
Year	Title	Role	Notes
1919	Die Herrin der Welt 1. Teil - Die Freundin des gelben Mannes		
1919	Die Herrin der Welt 4. Teil - König Macombe		
1920	Die Herrin der Welt 8. Teil - Die Rache der Maud Fergusson		
1924	Die Kurtisane von Venedig		
1930	The Song Is Ended	Frau von Treuberg / Die Dame / The Lady	
1930	Petit officier... Adieu!	Grandmother	
1931	Tänzerinnen für Süd-Amerika gesucht	Inge's Mother	
1932	The Prince of Arcadia	Die Ex-Fürstin Tante	
1932	Scampolo	Frau Schmid	
1935	Pygmalion	Mrs. Higgins	
1935	Es flüstert die Liebe	Peter's Mutter	
1936	The Girl Irene	Großmutter	
1937	Such Great Foolishness	Grafin Hoyer	
1938	The Gambler	Babuschka	
1938	Thirteen Chairs	Oberschwester im Weisenhaus	
1938	Das Leben kann so schön sein	Sophie Klützner	
1939	Hotel Sacher	Frau Anna Sacher	
1939	Waldrausch	Frau Lutz	
1939	Maria Ilona	Erzherzogin Sophie	
1940	Der ungetreue Eckehart	Valerie, seine Frau	
1940	Alles Schwindel	Mathilde	
1940	My Daughter Lives in Vienna	Tante Ottilie Gerlach	
1940	Vienna Tales	Baronin Neudegg	
1940	Herzensfreud - Herzensleid	Großmutter Verhagen	
1940	Wunschkonzert	Frau Wagner	
1940	Fahrt ins Leben	Großmutter Wagner	
1941	Thrice Wed	Herzogin Tatjana	
1941	Aufruhr im Damenstift	Äbtissin	
1942	Vienna Blood	Furstin Auersbach	
1942	Sommerliebe	Frau von Schramm	
1943	Women Are No Angels	Frau Orla	
1943	A Man for My Wife	Großmutter Stollberg	
1947	Wiener Melodien	Mafalda Cellini	
1948	Alles Lüge	Frau Plamershof	
1948	The Angel with the Trumpet	Sophie Alt	
1949	Viennese Girls	Lisi	
1949	The Third Man	Anna's landlady	
1950	Großstadtnacht	Annis Tante	
1952	Gefangene Seele		
1952	Hinter Klostermauern		(final film role)
