= At the Well in Front of the Gate =

1952 film

- Directed by: Hans Wolff
- Written by: Bobby E. Lüthge; Rolf Dortenwald
- Produced by: Kurt Ulrich
- Starring: Sonja Ziemann; Hans Stüwe; Paul Klinger
- Cinematography: Kurt Schulz
- Edited by: Margarete Steinborn
- Music by: Willy Schmidt-Gentner
- Production company: Berolina Film
- Distributed by: Berolina Film
- Release date: 18 December 1952
- Running time: 92 minutes
- Country: West Germany
- Language: German
- Box office: 3.5 million DM

At the Well in Front of the Gate (German: Am Brunnen vor dem Tore) is a 1952 West German romance film directed by Hans Wolff and starring Sonja Ziemann, Hans Stüwe and Paul Klinger. It was shot in Agfacolor at the Tempelhof Studios in West Berlin and on location around Dinkelsbühl in Bavaria. The film's sets were designed by the art directors Willi A. Herrmann, Heinrich Weidemann and Peter Schlewski.

== Synopsis ==
Inge Bachner has three male suitors interested in her, including the owner of a petrol station and a former RAF pilot.

== Cast ==
- Sonja Ziemann as Inge Bachner
- Hans Stüwe as Georg Straaten
- Paul Klinger as Kurt Kramer
- Willy Fritsch as Robert's father
- Heli Finkenzeller as Mary Murphy
- Fritz Wagner as Robert Murphy
- Fritz Kösling as Erich Bachner
- Else Reval as Anna, Straaten's cook
- Marina Ried as Lilo, Inge's friend
- Hans Richter as Hans, vagrant
- Kurt Reimann as Nachtigall, vagrant
- Ludwig Schmitz as Tuennes, vagrant
- Jakob Tiedtke as civil registration official
- Karl Finkenzeller as Jim, chauffeur
- Hans Wolff as police commissioner
- Heinz Jungmann as policeman
- Alexa von Porembsky as Gerti, waitress

== Bibliography ==
- Lutz Peter Koepnick. The Cosmopolitan Screen: German Cinema and the Global Imaginary, 1945 to the Present. University of Michigan Press, 2007.
