= Hans Wolff (director) =

German film editor and director

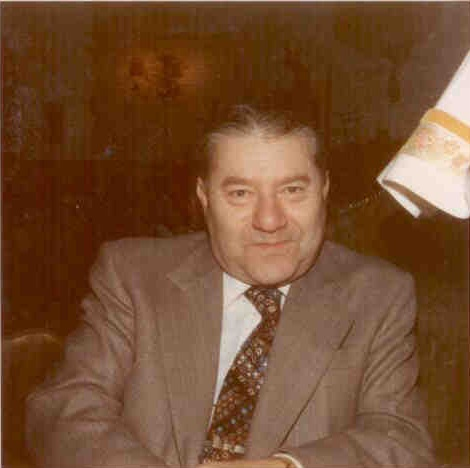
Hans Wolff (director)

Hans Wolff (2 October 1911, Berlin – 1 June 1979) was a German film editor and director.

== Selected filmography ==
=== Editor ===
- Playing with Fire (1934)
- The World's in Love (1935)
- Mazurka (1935)
- Court Theatre (1936)
- Tomfoolery (1936)
- Rendezvous in Vienna (1936)
- Capers (1937)
- Serenade (1937)
- The Jumping Jack (1938)
- Bel Ami (1939)
- I Am Sebastian Ott (1939)
- Operetta (1940)
- Women Are No Angels (1943)
- Dog Days (1944)
- Viennese Girls (1945)

=== Director ===
- Der Hofrat Geiger (1947)
- Shadows Over Naples (1951)
- Captive Soul (1952)
- I Can't Marry Them All (1952)
- At the Well in Front of the Gate (1952)
- It Was Always So Nice With You (1954)
- The Three from the Filling Station (1955)
- The Road to Paradise (1956)
- August der Halbstarke (1957)
- Trees Are Blooming in Vienna (1958)

=== Producer ===
- The Lightship (1963)

=== Actor ===
- The Singing House (1948) - Rotter, Manager
- Großstadtnacht (1950)
- At the Well in Front of the Gate (1952) - Kriminalkommissar (final film role)
