= Bel Ami (1939 film) =

1939 German film directed by Willi Forst

- Directed by: Willi Forst
- Written by: Guy de Maupassant (original novel); Willi Forst, Axel Eggebregt (screenplay)
- Produced by: Willi Forst
- Starring: Olga Chekhova; Hilde Hildebrand; Ilse Werner; Lizzi Waldmüller; Willi Forst; Johannes Riemann; Will Dohm; Aribert Wäscher; Hubert von Meyerinck; Hadrian Maria Netto; Bruno Ziener
- Cinematography: Theodore J. Pahle
- Edited by: Hans Wolff
- Music by: Theo Mackeben
- Production company: Willi Forst-Films
- Distributed by: Tobis Film
- Release date: 21 February 1939
- Running time: 96 minutes
- Country: Germany
- Language: German

Bel Ami is a 1939 German film directed by Willi Forst. It is loosely based on Guy de Maupassant's 1885 novel Bel Ami, with considerable changes to the original plot.

== Plot ==
In Paris, in about 1900, George Duroy, just returned from Morocco, spends a night with the singer Rachel, who is rehearsing the song Bel Ami. Later at a party he tells the newspaper editor Forestier about Morocco. At the request of the ladies present Duroy is engaged by Walter, proprietor of La Vie Française, as a journalist.

Forestier's wife Madeleine, who is also the mistress of the Député Laroche, whom she allows to exploit her in order to influence the newspaper as Laroche wishes, helps Duroy in the composition of his texts. Forestier becomes jealous of Duroy and divorces Madeleine.

The Minister for the Colonies, who has campaigned for a restrained foreign policy, has to resign. His successor is Laroche, who initially stands for interventionist policies because of his ownership of land in Morocco. However, he is blackmailed by Moroccan nobles who see through his motives. In order to give his change of position an acceptable public appearance he asks Madeleine to marry Duroy, who has meantime risen to editor-in-chief. She does so, but the marriage does not last long.

Duroy saves Laroche's daughter Suzanne when her horse bolts. Without introducing themselves they arrange to meet at the opera ball that evening. There, thanks to Rachel, who for a long time has been performing the song Bel Ami in a plush revue, Duroy learns the truth about Laroche's intrigues, which he publishes in his newspaper. Duroy is in love with Suzanne and divorces Madeleine to marry her. Laroche resigns, and Suzanne urges Duroy to enter politics. As minister Duroy prevents his former boss Walter from continuing the crooked intrigues of Laroche. He takes leave of his former wife Madeleine, Rachel and Frau von Marelle, in order to devote himself to his marriage with Suzanne.

== Political context ==
The film was made on the eve of the outbreak of the Second World War, at the time when Germany's going to war against France was already a very likely prospect. In Nazi Germany, the film industry was closely controlled by the Minister of Propaganda Joseph Goebbels. While Bel Ami was not conceived as an outright propaganda film, the theme of corruption in the French society and politics - prominently present in the Maupassant original - was well suited to the thrust of Nazi propaganda at the time the film was made.

== Other film references ==
In the film It Was Always So Nice With You (1954) Willi Forst plays a film director who together with two musicians (played by Georg Thomalla and Heinz Drache), composes the lyrics of the hit song Bel Ami, which finally he sings.

== DVD publication ==
The film is listed in the printed edition of the "Lexikon des internationalen Films", 1987, with a runtime of 100 minutes and an age restriction of 16 and over. The DVD published by Kinowelt in 2007 contains a version about 2 minutes shorter and free to the over-12s.
