= Marte Harell =

Austrian actress

- Born: 3 January 1907; Vienna, Austro-Hungarian Empire
- Died: 12 March 1996 (aged 89); Vienna, Austria
- Other name: Martha Schömig
- Occupation: Actress
- Years active: 1939 - 1981 (film & TV)

Marte Harell (3 January 1907 – 12 March 1996) was an Austrian film actress. She was married to Karl Hartl.

== Filmography ==
Year	Title	Role	Notes
1939	Opera Ball	Elisabeth Dannhauser	
1940	Vienna Tales	Christine Lechner	
1940	Ritorno	Carla Holm	
1940	Traummusik	Carla Holme	
1940	Roses in Tyrol	Fürstin Marie von Lichtenberg	
1941	Thrice Wed	Vera Petrowna	
1942	Brüderlein fein	Therese Krones	
1942	Die heimliche Gräfin	Martina Lehnhof	
1943	The Dark Day	Georgia Pauly, geb.Engelbrecht	
1943	Women Are No Angels	Helga	
1943	Tolle Nacht	Gloria	
1944	Romantische Brautfahrt	Maria Donata Stubitza	
1944	Schrammeln	Die Fiakermilli	
1944	Axel an der Himmelstür	Gloria, Filmstar	
1945	Die tolle Susanne		
1946	Die Fledermaus	Rosalinde Eisenstein	
1946	Glaube an mich	Irene von Weyden	
1947	Umwege zu dir		
1948	After the Storm	Barbara von Tretini	
1950	Archduke Johann's Great Love	Anna Plochl	
1951	Vienna Waltzes	Millie Trampusch	
1952	Rose of the Mountain	Rose Karnigg, Besitzerin Hotel 'Karawankenblick'	
1953	A Musical War of Love	Dr. Käthe Nimrod	
1955	Espionage	Gräfin Lichtenfels	
1955	The Congress Dances	Countess Ballansky	
1958	Trees Are Blooming in Vienna	Frau Sacher	
1960	The Hero of My Dreams	Frau Martens	
1964	Encounter in Salzburg	Fräulein Niederalt, Secretary	
1964	The Great Skate	Mrs. King - Chefin der amerikanischen Eisrevue	
1968	Assignment K	Mrs. Peters	Uncredited
1968	Otto ist auf Frauen scharf	Aunt Bertha	
1972	Was geschah auf Schloß Wildberg	Frau Körner	
1973	Abenteuer eines Sommers	Großmutter	
1978	Love Hotel in Tyrol	Schwester Angelika	
1981	Der Bockerer	Baronin	(final film role)

== Bibliography ==
- Goble, Alan. The Complete Index to Literary Sources in Film. Walter de Gruyter, 1999.
