= Josef Reithofer =

Austrian actor

- Born: 15 October 1883; Vienna, Austro-Hungarian Empire
- Died: 11 November 1950 (aged 67); West Berlin, West Germany
- Occupation: Actor
- Years active: 1917–1950 (film)

Josef Reithofer (1883–1950) was an Austrian stage and film actor.

== Selected filmography ==
- In the Line of Duty (1917)
- Without Witnesses (1919)
- The Dancer from Tanagra (1920)
- The Princess of the Nile (1920)
- Fanny Elssler (1920)
- The Skull of Pharaoh's Daughter (1920)
- The Frankish Song (1923)
- Gentleman on Time (1924)
- The Tales of Hermann (1926)
- Ludwig II, King of Bavaria (1929)
- Dreyfus (1930)
- The Emperor's Waltz (1933)
- The Young Baron Neuhaus (1934)
- The Two Seals (1934)
- Playing with Fire (1934)
- Love Conquers All (1934)
- Blood Brothers (1935)
- His Late Excellency (1935)
- The Young Count (1935)
- Lessons in Love (1935)
- I Was Jack Mortimer (1935)
- Light Cavalry (1935)
- Winter in the Woods (1936)
- A Hoax (1936)
- Der Kaiser von Kalifornien (1936)
- Seven Slaps (1937)
- Meiseken (1937)
- Carousel (1937)
- The Man Who Couldn't Say No (1938)
- The Night of Decision (1938)
- Maria Ilona (1939)
- Robert Koch (1939)
- The Unfaithful Eckehart (1940)
- The Man in the Saddle (1945)
- Anna Alt (1945)
- The Court Concert (1948)

== Bibliography ==
- Volker, Klaus (1987). Fritz Kortner: Schauspieler und Regisseur (in German). Berlin: Hentrich. ISBN 978-3-926175-05-2.
