= Viennese Girls =

1949 film

- Austrian film poster
- German: Wiener Mädeln
- Directed by: Willi Forst
- Written by: Franz Gribitz; Erich Meder; Willi Forst
- Produced by: Willi Forst
- Starring: Willi Forst; Anton Edthofer; Judith Holzmeister; Dora Komar
- Cinematography: Viktor Meihsl; Jan Stallich; Hannes Staudinger
- Edited by: Hermann Leitner; Josefine Ramerstorfer; Hans Wolff
- Music by: Karl Pauspertl; Willy Schmidt-Gentner
- Production company: Wien-Film
- Distributed by: Sascha-Film (Austria); Sovexport (E.Germany)
- Release date: 19 August 1949; (E. Germany)
- Running time: 109 minutes
- Country: Austria (Part of Greater Germany)
- Language: German

Viennese Girls (German: Wiener Mädeln) is a 1945 historical musical film directed by Willi Forst and starring Forst, Anton Edthofer and Judith Holzmeister. The film was made by Wien-Film, a Vienna-based company set up after Austria had been incorporated into Greater Germany following the 1938 Anschluss. It was the third film in Forst's "Viennese Trilogy" which also included Operetta (1940) and Vienna Blood (1942). The film was finished in 1945, during the closing days of the Second World War. This led to severe delays in its release, which eventually took place in 1949 in two separate versions. One was released by the Soviet-backed Sovexport in the Eastern Bloc, and the other by Forst.

== Plot ==
The composer Carl Michael Ziehrer produces twenty two operettas during his career, although he is overshadowed by the more successful Strauss Family (Johann Strauss I and his son Johann Strauss II).

== Cast ==
- Willi Forst as Carl Michael Ziehrer
- Anton Edthofer as Hofrat Munk
- Judith Holzmeister as Klara, his daughter
- Dora Komar as Mitzi
- Vera Schmid as Liesl
- Hilde Föda as Gretl, her daughter
- Hans Moser as Engelbert
- Edmund Schellhammer as Johann Strauss
- Friedl Haerlin as Mrs. Strauß
- Leopold Hainisch as Karl Haslinger
- Lizzi Holzschuh as Mrs. Haslinger
- Hansi Stork as Fürstin Pauline Metternich
- Curd Jürgens as Count Lechenberg
- Ferdinand Mayerhofer as Ziehrer sen.
- Fred Liewehr as John Cross
- Alfred Neugebauer as exposition director
- André Mattoni as his secretary
- Hedwig Bleibtreu as Lisi
- Fritz Imhoff as Paradeiser
- Max Gülstorff as theatre director
- Hilde Konetzni as singer
- Erik Frey
- Pepi Glöckner-Kramer
- Harry Hardt
- Victor Janson
- Peter Norman as Singer
- Fritz Odemar
- Oscar Sabo
- Jakob Tiedtke
- Egon von Jordan
- Lina Woiwode
- Ernst Schiffner

== See also ==
- Überläufer
