= Inge Konradi =

Austrian actress

- Born: 24 July 1924; Vienna, Austria
- Died: 4 February 2002 (aged 77); Vienna, Austria
- Occupation: Actress
- Years active: 1947-2000 (film & TV)

Inge Konradi (27 July 1924 – 4 February 2002) was an Austrian stage and film actress.

== Filmography ==
Year	Title	Role	Notes
1947	Triumph der Liebe	Mika	
1947	Singende Engel	Josefine, seine Tochter	
1948	Rendezvous im Salzkammergut	Gretl Wiesinger	
1948	The Heavenly Waltz	Beate	
1949	Ein bezaubernder Schwindler	Helga Schumann, Sportlehrerin	
1949	Mein Freund, der nicht nein sagen kann	Steffi	
1950	Cordula	Anni	
1951	The Magic Face	Fritzi	
1952	Adventure in Vienna	Marie	
1953	Stolen Identity	Marie	
1953	The Venus of Tivoli	Manci Sipos	
1953	Must We Get Divorced?	Annerl	
1956	Die Magd von Heiligenblut	Annerl	
1957	The King of Bernina	Monika	
1964	The Spendthrift	Rosa, Kammermädchen	

== Bibliography ==
- Fritsche, Maria. Homemade Men in Postwar Austrian Cinema: Nationhood, Genre and Masculinity. Berghahn Books, 2013.
- Goble, Alan. The Complete Index to Literary Sources in Film. Walter de Gruyter, 1999.
