= The Tales of Hermann =

1926 film

- Directed by: Kurt Stanke
- Written by: Paul Beyer; Armin Petersen
- Starring: Margarete Kupfer; Hermann Picha; Josef Reithofer
- Cinematography: Kurt Stanke
- Production company: Sternschein-Film
- Release date: 1926
- Country: Germany
- Languages: Silent; German intertitles

The Tales of Hermann (German: Hermanns Erzählungen) is a 1926 German silent film directed by Kurt Stanke and starring Margarete Kupfer, Hermann Picha, and Josef Reithofer.

The film's sets were designed by August Rinaldi.

== Cast ==
- Margarete Kupfer as Margarethe, die Köchin
- Hermann Picha as Hermann, das Faktotum
- Josef Reithofer as Franz, der Chauffeur
- Hella Londa as Irma, das Hausmädchen / Manja
- Curt von der Wyck as Der junge Herr
- Iwan Iwanoff as Carfamba
- Hang-Kong as Mongolischer Konsul
- Eric Jackson as Jean, der Diener

== Bibliography ==
- Alfred Krautz. International directory of cinematographers, set- and costume designers in film, Volume 4. Saur, 1984.
