= Wilma Tatzel =

Austrian actress

- Born: 10 May 1920; Vienna, Austria
- Died: 2 July 1992 (aged 72); Graz, Austria
- Occupation: Actress
- Years active: 1938–1945 (film)

Wilma Tatzel (10 May 1920 – 2 July 1992) was an Austrian stage and film actress. During the Second World War she appeared in supporting roles in films produced by the Vienna-based Wien Film.

== Selected filmography ==
- Robot-Girl Nr. 1 (1938)
- The Waitress Anna (1941)
- Vienna Blood (1942)
- Two Happy People (1943)
- Aufruhr der Herzen (1944)
- Das schwarze Schaf (1944)
- Dog Days (1944)
- Why Are You Lying, Elisabeth? (1944)

== Bibliography ==
- Dvořáková, Tereza & Klimeš, Ivan . Prag-Film AG 1941-1945: im Spannungsfeld zwischen Protektorats- und Reichskinematografie. 2008.
