= Hans Jaray =

Austrian actor and playwright

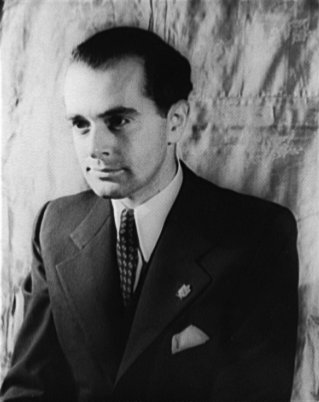
- Hans Jaray in 1940
- Born: 24 June 1906; Vienna, Austro-Hungarian Empire
- Died: 6 January 1990 (aged 83); Vienna, Austria
- Occupation: Actor
- Years active: 1926 - 1978 (film)

Hans Jaray (1906–1990) was an Austrian actor and playwright. He also wrote and directed several television films. Jaray starred as a leading man in a number of 1930s films, such as the Schubert biopic Gently My Songs Entreat (1933).

== Career ==
Jaray emigrated to the United States following the Anchluss of 1938, but returned to Vienna after the Second World War.

The 1934 Czech film Man in Demand on All Sides was based on one of his plays.

In one of his final roles he appeared in the 1977 West German television series Uncle Silas.

== Selected filmography ==
- Sons in Law (1926)
- The Love of Jeanne Ney (1927)
- The Beggar Student (1931)
- The Emperor's Sweetheart (1931)
- Gently My Songs Entreat (1933)
- Peter (1934)
- Unfinished Symphony (1934)
- Ball at the Savoy (1935)
- Her Highness Dances the Waltz (1935)
- The Affairs of Maupassant (1936)
- Fräulein Lilli (1936)
- The Priest from Kirchfeld (1937)
- Lydia (1941)
- Carnegie Hall (1947)
- Voices of Spring (1952)

== Bibliography ==
- Bergfelder, Tim & Cargnelli, Christian. Destination London: German-speaking emigrés and British cinema, 1925-1950. Berghahn Books, 2008.
