= Gently My Songs Entreat =

1933 film

- Directed by: Willi Forst
- Written by: Walter Reisch; Willi Forst
- Produced by: Gregor Rabinovitch
- Starring: Marta Eggerth; Luise Ullrich; Hans Jaray; Hans Moser
- Cinematography: Albert Benitz; Franz Planer
- Edited by: Viktor Gertler
- Music by: Willy Schmidt-Gentner
- Production company: Cine-Allianz Tonfilm
- Release date: 8 September 1933
- Running time: 85 minutes
- Countries: Austria; Germany
- Language: German

Gently My Songs Entreat (German: Leise flehen meine Lieder) is a 1933 Austrian-German musical film directed by Willi Forst and starring Marta Eggerth, Luise Ullrich and Hans Jaray. The film was shot at the Sievering Studios in Vienna with art direction by Julius von Borsody. The film is a biopic of the composer Franz Schubert (1797–1828). It was Forst's directorial debut. A British version was made called Unfinished Symphony. The German title refers to the first line of the Lied "Ständchen" (Serenade) from Schubert's collection Schwanengesang, "the most famous serenade in the world", which Eggerth performs in the film.

== Cast ==
- Marta Eggerth as Countess Eszterhazy
- Luise Ullrich as Emmi Passenter
- Hans Jaray as Franz Schubert
- Hans Moser as pawnbroker Passenter
- Otto Treßler as Count Esterhazy
- Hans Olden as Hüttenbrener
- Raoul Aslan as Salieri
- Blanka Glossy as Schubert's landlady
- Anna Kallina as Countess Kinsky
- Paul Wagner as Lieutenant Folliot
- Gucki Wippel as Maria
- Ernst Arndt
- Karl Forest

== Bibliography ==
- Dassanowsky, Robert. World Film Locations: Vienna. Intellect Books, 2012.
- Hake, Sabine. Popular Cinema of the Third Reich. University of Texas Press, 2001.
