= The Unfaithful Eckehart (1931 film) =

1931 film directed by Carl Boese

- Directed by: Carl Boese
- Written by: Hans Sturm (play); Walter Schlee; Walter Wassermann
- Produced by: Lothar Stark
- Starring: Ralph Arthur Roberts; Fritz Schulz; Paul Hörbiger
- Cinematography: Adolf Schlasy
- Music by: Franz Grothe
- Production company: Lothar Stark-Film
- Distributed by: Messtro-Film
- Release date: 21 September 1931
- Running time: 88 minutes
- Country: Germany
- Language: German

The Unfaithful Eckehart (German: Der ungetreue Eckehart) is a 1931 German comedy film directed by Carl Boese and starring Ralph Arthur Roberts, Fritz Schulz and Paul Hörbiger. The film is based on the play of the same title by Hans Sturm. It was remade in 1940. A silent film was made by Reinhold Schünzel in 1928 under the title Don Juan in a Girls' School.

== Synopsis ==
A man who is faithful to his wife is mistakenly blamed for the philandering antics of his brother-in-law.

== Cast ==
- Ralph Arthur Roberts as Dr. Eckehart Bleibtreu
- Fritz Schulz as Fritz Stürmer
- Paul Hörbiger as Karl Moor
- Paul Henckels as Kommerzienrat Apel
- Alexander Murski as Gesandter
- Albert Paulig as Legionsrat
- Lissy Arna as Ärztin Fräulein Dr. Drewello
- Lucie Englisch as Traute Bleibtreu
- Margarete Kupfer as Frau Apel
- Jenny Kiefe as Gitta Stürmer
- Anni Markart as Susi Moor
- Herta Schröder as Sekretärin
- Eva Schmid-Kayser as Zofe bei Stürmer
- Vicky Werckmeister as Zofe bei Susi Moor
- Comedian Harmonists as Themselves

== Bibliography ==
- Grange, William. Cultural Chronicle of the Weimar Republic. Scarecrow Press, 2008.
