= The Unfaithful Eckehart (1940 film) =

1940 film directed by Hubert Marischka

- German: Der ungetreue Eckehart
- Directed by: Hubert Marischka
- Written by: Hans Sturm (play); Hubert Marischka; Kurt E. Walter
- Produced by: Friedrich Wilhelm Gaik; Paul Hörbiger; Karl Künzel; Kurt Ulrich
- Starring: Hans Moser; Hedwig Bleibtreu; Lucie Englisch
- Cinematography: Eduard Hoesch
- Edited by: Margarete Steinborn
- Music by: Ludwig Schmidseder
- Production company: Algefa Film
- Distributed by: Siegel-Monopolfilm
- Release date: 25 January 1940
- Country: Germany
- Language: German

The Unfaithful Eckehart (German: Der ungetreue Eckehart) is a 1940 German comedy film directed by Hubert Marischka and starring Hans Moser, Hedwig Bleibtreu and Lucie Englisch. It is based on Hans Sturm's play of the same title, which had previously been made into a 1928 film and a 1931 film.

The film's sets were designed by the art directors Gabriel Pellon and Heinrich Richter.

== Cast ==
- Hans Moser as Arthur Fellner
- Hedwig Bleibtreu as Valerie, his wife
- Lucie Englisch as Traute
- Ethel Reschke as Agathe
- Theo Lingen as Eckehart, Schwiegerson
- Rudi Godden as Fritz Flotter
- Else Elster as Susi Moor
- Victor Janson as Cnortez
- Lotte Spira
- Hans Stiebner
- Walter Bechmann
- Egon Brosig
- Franz Fiedler
- Irmgard Hoesch
- Wolfgang Klein
- Ruth Lommel
- Josef Reithofer
- Walter Schramm-Duncker
- Hanns Waschatko
- Ewald Wenck
- Hilde Wittke
- Kurt Zehe
- Norman Revels
