= Unfinished Symphony (film) =

- Original lobby card
- Directed by: Anthony Asquith; Willi Forst
- Written by: Willi Forst; Benn W. Levy; Walter Reisch
- Starring: Mártha Eggerth; Helen Chandler; Hans Jaray; Ronald Squire
- Cinematography: Franz Planer
- Production companies: Gaumont British; Cine-Allianz Tonfilmproduktion
- Distributed by: Gaumont British (UK); Fox Film Corporation (US)
- Release dates: 23 August 1934 (UK); 11 January 1935 (US)
- Running time: 84 minutes
- Countries: United Kingdom; Germany

Unfinished Symphony is a 1934 British-German musical drama film directed by Willi Forst and Anthony Asquith and starring Mártha Eggerth, Helen Chandler, Hans Jaray, and Ronald Squire. The film is based on the story of Franz Schubert who, in the 1820s left his symphony unfinished after losing the love of his life. The film's alternate German-language version was called Gently My Songs Entreat. This title refers to the first line of the Lied "Ständchen" (Serenade) from Schubert's collection Schwanengesang, "the most famous serenade in the world", performed by Mártha Eggerth in the film.

== Cast ==
- Mártha Eggerth as Caroline Esterhazy
- Hans Jaray as Franz Schubert
- Cecil Humphreys as Antonio Salieri
- Helen Chandler as Emmie Passenter
- Ronald Squire as Count Esterhazy
- Esmé Percy as Huettenbrenner
- Eliot Makeham as Joseph Passenter
- Paul Wagner as Lieutenant Folliot
- Hermine Sperler as Princess Kinsky
- Beryl Laverick as Mary Esterhazy
- Brember Wills as Esterhazy's Secretary

== Critical reception ==
The New York Times wrote, "with a happy unconcern for dismal historical truths, the agreeable little musical film at the Roxy pursues the history of Franz Schubert's glorious B Minor symphony along the silken paths of romance...Hans Jaray's performance reveals Schubert as a gentle and sad-faced youth, inordinately sensitive and at the same time filled with modest confidence in his genius. The well-known German actress and singer, Marta Eggerth, is the lovely aristocrat who laughed at the wrong time, and she helps the photoplay considerably with the warmth and skill of her interpretations of the Schubert songs. Helen Chandler pouts agreeably as the unhappy pawnshop maiden who loved the composer though his heart belonged to another. Despite its mediocre and sometimes wretched photography, Unfinished Symphony provides a politely winning background for the immortal lieder of the great composer."
