= Willi Forst =

Austrian actor (1903–1980)

- Born: Wilhelm Anton Frohs; 7 April 1903; Vienna, Austria-Hungary
- Died: 11 August 1980 (aged 77); Vienna, Austria

Willi Forst, born Wilhelm Anton Frohs (7 April 1903 – 11 August 1980) was an Austrian actor, screenwriter, film director, film producer and singer. As a debonair actor he was a darling of the German-speaking film audiences, as a director, one of the most significant makers of the Viennese period musical melodramas and comedies of the 1930s known as Wiener Filme. From the mid-1930s he also recorded many records, largely of sentimental Viennese songs, for the Odeon Records label owned by Carl Lindström AG.

== Biography ==
His first major role was opposite Marlene Dietrich in the silent film Café Elektric in 1927. However, he was best known for his characters in light musicals, which rapidly made him a star. He developed the genre of the Viennese Film with writer Walter Reisch in the 1930s, beginning with the Franz Schubert melodrama Leise flehen meine Lieder (1933) which became an iconic role for the actor Hans Jaray and Maskerade (1934), which launched his fame as a significant director and brought Paula Wessely to international fame. He founded his own film company, Willi Forst-Film, in 1937 and considered a move to Hollywood the same year.

Following the annexation of Austria in 1938, he was much courted by the National Socialists but succeeded in avoiding overt political statement, concentrating entirely on the opulent period musical entertainment for which he was famous and which was much in demand during World War II. During the seven-year Nazi rule in Austria, he only made six films, none of them political (although his ardent Vienna-Austrian topos is considered subversive of pan-German Nazism by many film historians), which are considered among his finest and classics of the Viennese Film genre.

He had comparatively little success after the war except for the film The Sinner (1951) starring Hildegard Knef, which became a scandal because of the protests of the Roman Catholic church against its nudity, rare in contemporary German-speaking cinema, but which subsequently attracted an audience of seven million people. He gave international actress Senta Berger her first role in 1957 and that same year directed his last film (Vienna, City of My Dreams), after which he retired from the industry, suggesting that his style was no longer in demand.

Forst is today considered one of Europe's important early sound directors. After the death of his wife in 1973, he lived a reclusive life in the Swiss canton of Ticino. He died of cancer in Vienna in 1980 and is buried in Neustift am Walde.

== Filmography ==
=== Actor ===
- Sodom and Gomorrah (1922)
- Oh, Dear Augustine (1922)
- Der verwechselte Filmstar (1922)
- Lieb' mich und die Welt ist mein (1923)
- The Eleven Devils (1927)
- Café Elektric (1927)
- Die drei Niemandskinder (1927)
- Love on Skis (1928)
- A Better Master (1928)
- Ein Tag Film (1928)
- Folly of Love (1928)
- The Blue Mouse (1928)
- German Wine (1928)
- The Convict from Istanbul (1929)
- The Happy Vagabonds (1929)
- Miss Midshipman (1929)
- Atlantik (1929, his first sound film)
- The Woman Everyone Loves Is You (1929)
- The White Roses of Ravensberg (1929)
- Katharina Knie (1929)
- Dangers of the Engagement Period (1930)
- The Song Is Ended (1930)
- A Gentleman for Hire (1930)
- A Student's Song of Heidelberg (1930)
- Ein Tango für Dich (1930)
- Petit officier… Adieu! (1930)
- Two Hearts in Waltz Time (1930)
- The Theft of the Mona Lisa (1931)
- The Merry Wives of Vienna (1931)
- The Prince of Arcadia (1932)
- A Blonde Dream (1932)
- You Don't Forget Such a Girl (1932)
- Peter Voss, Thief of Millions (1932)
- Her Highness the Saleswoman (1933)
- The Burning Secret (1933)
- So Ended a Great Love (1934)
- The Royal Waltz (1935)
- I Am Sebastian Ott (1939)
- Bel Ami (1939)
- Operetta (1940)
- Viennese Girls (1945)
- Miracles Still Happen (1951)
- Walking Back into the Past (1954)
- Ein Mann vergißt die Liebe (1955)

=== Director ===
- Gently My Songs Entreat (Austria/Germany, 1933)
- Maskerade (Austria, 1934)
- Unfinished Symphony (UK/Austria, 1934)
- Mazurka (1935)
- Tomfoolery (1936)
- Court Theatre (Austria, 1936)
- Serenade (1937)
- I Am Sebastian Ott (1939)
- Bel Ami (1939)
- Operetta (1940)
- Vienna Blood (1942)
- Women Are No Angels (1943)
- Viennese Girls (1945)
- The Sinner (1951)
- Miracles Still Happen (1951)
- The White Horse Inn (1952)
- Cabaret (1954)
- The Three from the Filling Station (1955)
- Kaiserjäger (1956)
- The Unexcused Hour (1957)
- Vienna, City of My Dreams (1957)

=== Screenwriter only ===
- Capers (1937)

== Awards ==
- 1968 Bundesfilmpreis (Filmband in Gold) for his life's work

== Sources ==
- Kirsten Burghardt, Werk, Skandal, Exempel. Munich 1996 (deals with Forst's film "Die Sünderin") ISBN 3-926372-61-3
- Robert Dachs, Willi Forst. Eine Biographie. Vienna 1986. ISBN 3-218-00437-3
- Armin Loacker (ed.), Willi Forst - Ein Filmstil aus Wien. 2003. ISBN 9783901932243
