= Vienna Blood (film) =

- Wiener Blut DVD cover
- Directed by: Willi Forst
- Screenplay by: Ernst Marischka; Axel Eggebrecht; Viktor Léon (Libretto); Leo Stein (Libretto)
- Produced by: Willi Forst; Hans Somborn
- Starring: Fred Liewehr; Willy Fritsch; Maria Holst; Hedwig Bleibtreu; Hans Moser; Theo Lingen; Dorit Kreysler; Paul Henckels; Wilma Tatzel; Klaramaria Skala; Egon von Jordan; Ernst Fritz Fürbringer; Fritz Imhoff
- Cinematography: Jan Stallich
- Edited by: Arnfried Heyne
- Music by: Johann Strauss II; Willy Schmidt-Gentner
- Production companies: Deutsche Forst-Filmproduktion GmbH; Wien-Film
- Release date: 2 April 1942
- Running time: 103 minutes
- Country: Germany
- Language: German
- Budget: 2,700,000 ℛ︁ℳ︁ (equivalent to €11,319,602 in 2021)
- Box office: 7,000,000 ℛ︁ℳ︁ (equivalent to €29,347,116 in 2021)

Vienna Blood (German: Wiener Blut) is a 1942 German operetta film, based on the 1899 operetta of the same name. With box-office takings of seven million Reichsmarks, it was one of the most financially successful films of the Nazi era.

== Plot ==
The young Count Georg Wolkersheim (Willy Fritsch) is sent to the Congress of Vienna (1814–1815) to represent the interests of his country, Reuss-Schleiz-Greiz. Tensions arise between the count, his wife Melanie (Maria Holst), and their two chamberlains (Hans Moser and Theo Lingen), and when the four of them attend a court ball, Melanie leaves Georg, assumes the identity of a famous actress, and attracts the affections of Crown Prince Ludwig of Bavaria (Fred Liewehr). Georg quits the ball and returns to his lodgings to wait for his wife. Meanwhile, the two servants plot to further inflame Georg's jealousy by posing as Ludwig to commission a portrait of Melanie from the famous artist Moritz Daffinger (Egon von Jordan). The next day, however, Georg and Daffinger expose the servants' ruse, Ludwig reveals to Melanie that he has discovered her true identity, and all is forgiven.

== Release history ==
The film had its national premieres on 2 April 1942 in Vienna and on 17 April 1942 in Berlin, and was first aired on television on the GDR's Deutscher Fernsehfunk on 15 October 1962. Its American premiere, under the title Vienna Blood, was on 21 March 1951 in New York City. Studiocanal released a DVD version on 25 July 2008. Running times of the various releases vary from 103 to 111 minutes.

== Awards ==
The Reich's Film Review Office officially recognized Wiener Blut as "of particular artistic value" and "culturally valuable". The film also received an award at the 10th Venice International Film Festival.

== Cast ==
- Willy Fritsch as Graf Georg Wolkersheim
- Maria Holst as Gräfin Melanie Wolkersheim
- Hans Moser as Knöpfel
- Theo Lingen as Jean
- Dorit Kreysler as Liesl Stadler
- Fred Liewehr as Crown-Prince Ludwig von Bayern
- Hedwig Bleibtreu as Fürstin Auersbach
- Klaramaria Skala as Ulli
- Paul Henckels as Fürst Ypsheim
- Ernst Fritz Fürbringer as Metternich
- Egon von Jordan as Daffinger
- Fritz Imhoff as Urwiener
- Maria Reining as Kammersängerin
- Lea Piltti as Singer
- Wilma Tatzel as Anni
- Wiener Philharmoniker as Group cast appearance
- Karl Blühm
- Julius Karsten

== Bibliography ==
- Hake, Sabine. Popular Cinema of the Third Reich. University of Texas Press, 2001.
