= List of West German films of 1954 =

List of films produced in Germany in 1954

List of West German films of 1954. This was the fifth full year of film production since the formal partition of Germany into East and West in 1949. Major production centres were gathered in Hamburg, Munich and West Berlin. A separate East German film industry controlled by DEFA operated in East Berlin.

== A–K ==
Title	Director	Cast	Genre	Notes
08/15	Paul May	Joachim Fuchsberger, Hans Christian Blech, Emmerich Schrenk	Military Drama	Released as trilogy in 1954/1955
The Abduction of the Sabine Women	Kurt Hoffmann	Gustav Knuth, Fita Benkhoff, Paul Hörbiger	Musical comedy	
The Angel with the Flaming Sword	Gerhard Lamprecht	Gertrud Kückelmann, Petra Peters, Martin Benrath	Drama	
Annie from Tharau	Wolfgang Schleif	Ilse Werner, Heinz Engelmann, Helmuth Schneider	Romance	
Ball of Nations	Karl Ritter	Zsa Zsa Gabor, Gustav Fröhlich, Claudine Dupuis	Musical	
The Beautiful Miller	Wolfgang Liebeneiner	Waltraut Haas, Gerhard Riedmann, Hertha Feiler	Romance	
The Beginning Was Sin	Franz Cap	Ruth Niehaus, Viktor Staal, Hansi Knoteck	Drama	
The Big Star Parade	Paul Martin	Adrian Hoven, Renate Holm, Gunther Philipp	Musical comedy	
Bon Voyage	Thomas Engel	Paul Hubschmid, Inge Egger, Paul Klinger	Musical	
Cabaret	Willi Forst	Paul Henreid, Eva Kerbler, Fritz Schulz	Drama	
Canaris	Alfred Weidenmann	O.E. Hasse, Martin Held, Adrian Hoven	Spy drama	
Captain Wronski	Ulrich Erfurth	Willy Birgel, Antje Weisgerber, Elisabeth Flickenschildt	Spy drama	
Carnival Story	Kurt Neumann	Anne Baxter, Steve Cochran, Lyle Bettger	Drama	Co-production with United States
Circus of Love	Kurt Neumann	Eva Bartok, Curd Jürgens, Bernhard Wicki	Drama	Co-production with United States
Clivia	Karl Anton	Claude Farell, Peter Pasetti, Paul Dahlke	Musical	
Columbus Discovers Kraehwinkel	Ulrich Erfurth	Eva Kerbler, Rudolf Platte, Sydney Chaplin	Comedy	
Conchita and the Engineer	Franz Eichhorn, Hans Hinrich	Paul Hartmann, Vanja Orico, Robert Freitag	Adventure	Co-production with Brazil
The Confession of Ina Kahr	G.W. Pabst	Curd Jürgens, Elisabeth Müller, Albert Lieven	Drama	
Confession Under Four Eyes	André Michel	Hildegard Knef, Carl Raddatz, Ivan Desny	Crime	
Consul Strotthoff	Erich Engel	Willy Birgel, Inge Egger, Carl Wery	Drama	
The Country Schoolmaster	Hans Deppe	Barbara Rütting, Claus Holm, Carola Höhn	Drama	
The Crazy Clinic	Alwin Elling	Ingrid Andree, Maria Andergast, Claus Biederstaedt	Comedy	
Dancing in the Sun	Géza von Cziffra	Cécile Aubry, Ursula Justin, Rudolf Platte	Musical	
Daybreak	Viktor Tourjansky	Hans Stüwe, Elisabeth Müller, Alexander Kerst	Drama	
Dear Miss Doctor	Hans H. König	Edith Mill, Hans Nielsen, Robert Freitag	Comedy	
Don't Worry About Your Mother-in-Law	Erich Engels	Grethe Weiser, Lonny Kellner, Claus Biederstaedt	Comedy	
A Double Life	Victor Vicas	Michel Auclair, Simone Simon, Barbara Rütting	Drama	Co-production with France
Emil and the Detectives	Robert A. Stemmle	Heli Finkenzeller, Kurt Meisel, Wolfgang Lukschy	Adventure	
The Eternal Waltz	Paul Verhoeven	Bernhard Wicki, Hilde Krahl, Annemarie Düringer	Drama	
The Faithful Hussar	Rudolf Schündler	Paul Hörbiger, Loni Heuser, Harald Paulsen	Comedy	
Fear	Roberto Rossellini	Ingrid Bergman, Mathias Wieman, Renate Mannhardt	Drama	Co-production with Italy
Fireworks	Kurt Hoffmann	Lilli Palmer, Romy Schneider, Karl Schönböck	Musical comedy	
The First Kiss	Erik Ode	Isa Günther, Jutta Günther, Erich Auer	Comedy	Co-production with Austria
The Flying Classroom	Kurt Hoffmann	Paul Dahlke, Paul Klinger, Erich Ponto	Comedy	
The Forester of the Silver Wood	Alfons Stummer	Anita Gutwell, Rudolf Lenz, Erik Frey	Drama	Co-production with Austria
A Girl from Paris	Franz Seitz	Etchika Choureau, Erich Schellow, Hans Leibelt	Comedy	
Girl with a Future	Thomas Engel	Herta Staal, Peter Pasetti, Nadja Tiller	Comedy	
The Golden Plague	John Brahm	Ivan Desny, Karlheinz Böhm, Gertrud Kückelmann	Drama	
The Great Lola	Hans Deppe	Herta Staal, Wolf Albach-Retty, Grethe Weiser	Comedy	
The Great Test	Rudolf Jugert	Luise Ullrich, Hans Söhnker, Karin Dor	Drama	
Guitars of Love	Werner Jacobs	Vico Torriani, Elma Karlowa, Harald Juhnke	Musical	
The Gypsy Baron	Arthur Maria Rabenalt	Paul Hörbiger, Margit Saad, Gerhard Riedmann	Musical	
Hansel and Gretel	Fritz Genschow	Renée Stobrawa, Rita-Maria Nowotny, Werner Stock	Family	
Homesick for Germany	Bernhard Radetzki	Albert Lieven, Ingrid Lutz, Petra Peters	Adventure	
A House Full of Love	Hans Schweikart	Gertrud Kückelmann, Michael Cramer, Wilfried Seyferth	Comedy	Co-production with Austria
The House on the Coast	Bosko Kosanovic	René Deltgen, Nadja Regin, Sybille Schmitz	Drama	Co-production with Yugoslavia
Hubertus Castle	Helmut Weiss	Friedrich Domin, Marianne Koch, Lil Dagover	Drama	
Hungarian Rhapsody	Peter Berneis, André Haguet	Colette Marchand, Paul Hubschmid, Willy Fritsch	Musical	Co-production with France
The Hunter's Cross	Hermann Kugelstadt	Jester Naefe, Armin Dahlen, Wera Frydtberg	Drama	
It Was Always So Nice With You	Hans Wolff	Heinz Drache, Georg Thomalla, Zarah Leander	Musical comedy	

== L–Z ==
Title	Director	Cast	Genre	Notes
The Last Summer	Harald Braun	Hardy Krüger, Liselotte Pulver, Brigitte Horney	Drama	
A Life for Do	Gustav Ucicky	Hans Söhnker, Paola Loew, Gisela Trowe	Drama	
The Life of Surgeon Sauerbruch	Rolf Hansen	Ewald Balser, Heidemarie Hatheyer, Hilde Körber	Biography	
The Little Czar	Arthur Maria Rabenalt	Luis Mariano, Sonja Ziemann, Iván Petrovich	Historical	
The Little Town Will Go to Sleep	Hans H. König	Gustav Fröhlich, Jester Naefe, Helen Vita	Comedy	
Love and Trumpets	Helmut Weiss	Hans Holt, Nadja Tiller, Marianne Koch	Musical comedy	
Love is Forever	Wolfgang Liebeneiner	Karlheinz Böhm, Ulla Jacobsson, Ingrid Andree	Drama	
A Love Story	Rudolf Jugert	Hildegard Knef, O.W. Fischer, Viktor de Kowa	Historical	
Lowlands	Leni Riefenstahl	Leni Riefenstahl, Bernhard Minetti, Aribert Wäscher	Drama	
The Man of My Life	Erich Engel	Marianne Hoppe, René Deltgen, Otto Gebühr	Drama	
Meines Vaters Pferde	Gerhard Lamprecht	Curd Jürgens, Eva Bartok, Reinhold Schünzel	Drama	
Men at a Dangerous Age	Carl-Heinz Schroth	Hans Söhnker, Liselotte Pulver, Annie Rosar	Comedy	
The Missing Miniature	Carl-Heinz Schroth	Ralph Lothar, Paola Loew, Paul Westermeier	Comedy	
Money from the Air	Géza von Cziffra	Josef Meinrad, Lonny Kellner, Grethe Weiser	Musical comedy	
The Mosquito	Walter Reisch	Hilde Krahl, Margot Hielscher, Gustav Knuth	Spy drama	Entered into the 1955 Cannes Film Festival
Mother Holly	Fritz Genschow	Renée Stobrawa, Rita-Maria Nowotny, Werner Stock	Family	
My Sister and I	Paul Martin	Sonja Ziemann, Adrian Hoven, Herta Staal	Musical	
On the Reeperbahn at Half Past Midnight	Wolfgang Liebeneiner	Hans Albers, Heinz Rühmann, Fita Benkhoff	Comedy, Drama	
Operation Edelweiss	Heinz Paul	Albert Hehn, Walter Ladengast, Gustl Gstettenbaur	War	
Orient Express	Carlo Ludovico Bragaglia	Silvana Pampanini, Eva Bartok, Curd Jürgens	Drama	Co-production with Italy
A Parisian in Rome	Erich Kobler	Barbara Laage, Alberto Sordi, Paul Hörbiger	Comedy	Co-production with Italy
The Perfect Couple	Robert A. Stemmle	Ingeborg Körner, Hans Reiser, Lucie Mannheim	Comedy	
The Phantom of the Big Tent	Paul May	René Deltgen, Angelika Hauff, Ilse Steppat	Thriller	
Portrait of an Unknown Woman	Helmut Käutner	Ruth Leuwerik, O.W. Fischer, Irene von Meyendorff	Comedy	
Prisoners of Love	Rudolf Jugert	Curd Jürgens, Annemarie Düringer, Mady Rahl	Drama	
The Prisoner of the Maharaja	Veit Harlan	Kristina Söderbaum, Willy Birgel, Adrian Hoven	Adventure	
The Red Prince	Franz Antel	Inge Egger, Peter Pasetti, Richard Häussler	Historical	Co-production with Austria
Regina Amstetten	Kurt Neumann	Luise Ullrich, Carl Raddatz, Carl Esmond	Drama	
Rose-Girl Resli	Harald Reinl	Christine Kaufmann, Josefin Kipper, Katharina Mayberg	Drama	
Roses from the South	Franz Antel	Maria Holst, Gustav Fröhlich, Susi Nicoletti	Comedy	
Sacred Lie	Wolfgang Liebeneiner	Ulla Jacobsson, Karlheinz Böhm, Erwin Strahl	Drama	
School for Marriage	Anton Schelkopf	Wolf Albach-Retty, Cornell Borchers, Liselotte Pulver	Comedy	
Schützenliesel	Rudolf Schündler	Herta Staal, Helmuth Schneider, Joe Stöckel	Musical	
The Seven Dresses of Katrin	Hans Deppe	Sonja Ziemann, Wolf Albach-Retty, Georg Thomalla	Romantic comedy	
She	Rolf Thiele	Marina Vlady, Walter Giller, Nadja Tiller	Comedy	
The Silent Angel	Harald Reinl	Josefin Kipper, Robert Freitag, Gustav Waldau	Drama	
The Sinful Village	Ferdinand Dörfler	Joe Stöckel, Günther Lüders, Renate Mannhardt	Comedy	
Son Without a Home	Hans Deppe	Werner Krauss, Elisabeth Flickenschildt, Eva Probst	Drama	
Spring Song	Hans Albin	Anne-Marie Blanc, René Deltgen, Albert Lieven	Drama	Co-production with Italy
The Sun of St. Moritz	Arthur Maria Rabenalt	Winnie Markus, Karlheinz Böhm, Signe Hasso	Drama	
Sun Over the Adriatic	Karl Georg Külb	Joachim Brennecke, Anneliese Kaplan, Carola Höhn	Musical	
The Sweetest Fruits	Franz Antel	Maria Holst, Wolf Albach-Retty, Katharina Mayberg	Comedy	
The Telephone Operator	Carl-Heinz Schroth	Renate Holm, Georg Thomalla, Fita Benkhoff	Musical	
Ten on Every Finger	Erik Ode	Germaine Damar, Erich Auer, Loni Heuser	Musical	
They Were So Young	Kurt Neumann	Johanna Matz, Scott Brady, Raymond Burr	Crime drama	Co-production with the United States
Three from Variety	Kurt Neumann	Ingrid Andree, Peter Pasetti, Paul Dahlke	Drama	
Victoria and Her Hussar	Rudolf Schündler	Eva Bartok, Grethe Weiser, Rudolf Forster	Musical	
Wedding Bells	Georg Wildhagen	Marianne Hold, Renate Mannhardt, Jan Hendriks	Drama	
The Witch	Gustav Ucicky	Anita Björk, Karlheinz Böhm, Attila Hörbiger	Drama	
A Woman of Today	Paul Verhoeven	Luise Ullrich, Curd Jürgens, Carsta Löck	Drama	

== Bibliography ==
- Davidson, John & Hake, Sabine. Framing the Fifties: Cinema in a Divided Germany. Berghahn Books, 2007.
- Fehrenbach, Heide. Cinema in Democratizing Germany: Reconstructing National Identity After Hitler. University of North Carolina Press, 1995.

== See also ==
- List of Austrian films of 1954
- List of East German films of 1954
