= List of West German films of 1952 =

List of films produced in West Germany in 1952

List of West German films of 1952. This was the third full year of film production since the formal partition of Germany into East and West in 1949. Major production centres were gathered in Hamburg, Munich and West Berlin.

== A–L ==
Title	Director	Cast	Genre	Notes
All Clues Lead to Berlin	Franz Cap	Kurt Meisel, Hans Nielsen, Barbara Rütting	Thriller	
Alraune	Arthur Maria Rabenalt	Hildegard Knef, Erich von Stroheim, Karlheinz Böhm	Horror, sci-fi	
Ambassadors of Music	Hermann Stöß	Hilde Körber, Werner Finck, Karla Höcker	Musical documentary	
At the Well in Front of the Gate	Hans Wolff	Sonja Ziemann, Hans Stüwe, Willy Fritsch	Romance	
Beautiful Night	Ralph Baum	Ingrid Lutz, Rudolf Platte, Hubert von Meyerinck	Musical comedy	Co-production with France
Behind Monastery Walls	Harald Reinl	Olga Chekhova, Philip Dorn, Dorothea Wieck	Drama	
Big City Secret	Leo de Laforgue	Ingrid Lutz, Fritz Wagner, Alfred Schieske	Crime	
The Blue and White Lion	Werner Jacobs	Wastl Witt, Elise Aulinger, Lore Frisch	Comedy	
Captive Soul	Hans Wolff	Adrian Hoven, Anne-Marie Blanc, Attila Hörbiger	Drama	
Carnival in White	Hans Albin, Harry R. Sokal	Adrian Hoven, Hannelore Bollmann, Lucie Englisch	Comedy	
The Chaste Libertine	Carl Boese	Georg Thomalla, Grethe Weiser, Marianne Koch	Comedy	
The Colourful Dream	Géza von Cziffra	Vera Molnar, Josef Meinrad, Ursula Grabley	Musical	
The Crucifix Carver of Ammergau	Harald Reinl	Erich Auer, Elise Aulinger, Ingeborg Cornelius	Drama	
Cuba Cabana	Fritz Peter Buch	Zarah Leander, O.W. Fischer, Paul Hartmann	Drama, Musical	
Dancing Stars	Géza von Cziffra	Germaine Damar, Georg Thomalla, Axel von Ambesser	Musical	
The Day Before the Wedding	Rolf Thiele	Paul Dahlke, Elisabeth Müller, Käthe Haack	Comedy	
Desires	Rolf Hansen	Heidemarie Hatheyer, O.W. Fischer, René Deltgen	Drama	
Don't Ask My Heart	Paul Martin	Willy Birgel, Heidemarie Hatheyer, Maria Holst	Drama	
The Exchange	Karl Anton	Viktor Staal, Carola Höhn, Gertrud Kückelmann	Comedy	
Father Needs a Wife	Harald Braun	Dieter Borsche, Ruth Leuwerik, Bruni Löbel	Comedy	
Fight of the Tertia	Erik Ode	Brigitte Rau, Wolfgang Jansen, Hans Stiebner	Family	
The Forester's Daughter	Arthur Maria Rabenalt	Johanna Matz, Karl Schönböck, Käthe von Nagy	Musical	
Fritz and Friederike	Géza von Bolváry	Liselotte Pulver, Albert Lieven, Erika von Thellmann	Comedy	
The Great Temptation	Rolf Hansen	Dieter Borsche, Ruth Leuwerik, Renate Mannhardt	Drama	
Heimat Bells	Hermann Kugelstadt	Hansi Knoteck, Armin Dahlen, Renate Mannhardt	Drama	
Holiday From Myself	Hans Deppe	Rudolf Prack, Marianne Hold, Willy Fritsch	Comedy	
Homesick for You	Robert A. Stemmle	Margot Hielscher, Peter Pasetti, Josefin Kipper	Musical	
House of Life	Karl Hartl	Gustav Fröhlich, Cornell Borchers, Viktor Staal	Drama	
I Can't Marry Them All	Hans Wolff	Sonja Ziemann, Adrian Hoven, Hardy Krüger	Musical	
I Lost My Heart in Heidelberg	Ernst Neubach	Adrian Hoven, Paul Hörbiger, Eva Probst	Musical	
Illusion in a Minor Key	Rudolf Jugert	Hildegard Knef, Sybille Schmitz, Hardy Krüger	Drama	
The Imaginary Invalid	Hans H. König	Joe Stöckel, Inge Egger, Oskar Sima	Comedy	
I'm Waiting for You	Volker von Collande	Hanna Rucker, Joachim Brennecke, Anne-Marie Blanc	Drama	
Klettermaxe	Kurt Hoffmann	Liselotte Pulver, Albert Lieven, Charlott Daudert	Crime comedy	
Knall and Fall as Imposters	Ulrich Bettac, Hubert Marischka	Hans Richter, Rudolf Carl, Curd Jürgens	Comedy	Co-production with Austria
The Land of Smiles	Hans Deppe, Erik Ode	Mártha Eggerth, Jan Kiepura, Paul Hörbiger	Musical	

== M–Z ==
Title	Director	Cast	Genre	Notes
The Merry Vineyard	Erich Engel	Gustav Knuth, Camilla Spira, Eva-Ingeborg Scholz	Comedy	
Mikosch Comes In	Johann Alexander Hübler-Kahla	Georg Thomalla, Willy Fritsch, Paul Hörbiger	Comedy	
The Mistress of Treves	Arthur Maria Rabenalt	Rossano Brazzi, Anne Vernon, Enzo Fiermonte	Historical	Co-production with Italy
Monks, Girls and Hungarian Soldiers	Ferdinand Dörfler	Joe Stöckel, Paul Hartmann, Petra Peters	Historical comedy	
My Name is Niki	Rudolf Jugert	Paul Hörbiger, Aglaja Schmid, Hardy Krüger	Comedy drama	
My Wife Is Being Stupid	Géza von Bolváry	Inge Egger, Hans Holt, Marina Ried	Comedy	
Nights on the Road	Rudolf Jugert	Hans Albers, Hildegard Knef, Lucie Mannheim	Crime	
No Greater Love	Harald Braun	Hilde Krahl, Dieter Borsche, Werner Hinz	Drama	
Oh, You Dear Fridolin	Peter Hamel	Hans Reiser, Ingrid Andree, Otto Gebühr	Comedy	
Once on the Rhine	Helmut Weiss	Maria Paudler, Paul Henckels, Albert Florath	Comedy	
Palace Hotel	Emil Berna, Leonard Steckel	Paul Hubschmid, Claude Farell, Anne-Marie Blanc	Drama	Co-production with Switzerland
Pension Schöller	Georg Jacoby	Camilla Spira, Eva Ingeborg Scholz, Joachim Brennecke	Comedy	
Poison in the Zoo	Hans Müller, Wolfgang Staudte	Irene von Meyendorff, Carl Raddatz, Petra Peters	Thriller	
The Prince of Pappenheim	Hans Deppe	Viktor de Kowa, Hannelore Schroth, Georg Thomalla	Comedy	
Queen of the Arena	Rolf Meyer	Maria Litto, Hans Söhnker, Grethe Weiser	Musical drama	
Road to Home	Romano Mengon	Angelika Hauff, Rolf Moebius, Eduard Köck	Drama	
Rose of the Mountain	Hubert Marischka	Marte Harell, Grethe Weiser, Waltraut Haas	Musical comedy	
Roses Bloom on the Moorland	Hans H. König	Ruth Niehaus, Hermann Schomberg, Gisela von Collande	Drama	
The Secret of the Mountain Lake	Jean Dréville	Lil Dagover, Marcelle Géniat, Michel Barbey	Drama	Co-production with Switzerland
The Sergeant's Daughter	George Hurdalek	Johanna Matz, Jan Hendriks, Paul Hartmann	Drama	
Shooting Stars	Hans Müller	Rudolf Prack, Ilse Steppat, Paul Dahlke	Drama	
The Smugglers' Banquet	Henri Storck	Françoise Rosay, Raymond Pellegrin, Paul Frankeur	Crime	Co-production with Belgium
That Can Happen to Anyone	Paul Verhoeven	Heinz Rühmann, Ingrid Lutz, Gustav Knuth	Comedy	
The Thief of Bagdad	Karel Lamač	Sonja Ziemann, Rudolf Prack, Theo Lingen, Paul Kemp	Comedy	
A Thousand Red Roses Bloom	Alfred Braun	Rudolf Prack, Winnie Markus, Maria Holst	Drama	
Three Days of Fear	Erich Waschneck	Rudolf Platte, Camilla Spira, Cornelia Froboess	Comedy	
Towers of Silence	Hans Bertram	Philip Dorn, Gisela Uhlen, Carl Raddatz	Adventure	
Toxi	Robert A. Stemmle	Paul Bildt, Johanna Hofer, Elfie Fiegert	Drama	
Turtledove General Delivery	Gerhard T. Buchholz	Horst Niendorf, Barbara Rütting, Wolfgang Jansen	Comedy	
Two People	Paul May	Edith Mill, Helmuth Schneider, Gustav Waldau	Historical drama	
Under the Thousand Lanterns	Erich Engel	Michel Auclair, Hanna Rucker, René Deltgen	Crime drama	West German-French co-production. Entered into the 1952 Cannes Film Festival
Until We Meet Again	Gustav Ucicky	Maria Schell, O.W. Fischer, Karl Ludwig Diehl	Drama	
A Very Big Child	Paul Verhoeven	Georg Thomalla, Angelika Hauff, Gardy Granass	Comedy	
Weekend in Paradise	Kurt Hoffmann	Paul Dahlke, Carola Höhn, Carsta Löck	Comedy	
We're Dancing on the Rainbow	Carmine Gallone, Arthur Maria Rabenalt	Inge Egger, Isa Barzizza, Karl Schönböck	Musical	Co-production with Italy
When the Heath Dreams at Night	Paul Martin	Rudolf Prack, Viktor Staal, Fita Benkhoff	Drama	
The White Adventure	Arthur Maria Rabenalt	Joe Stöckel, Lucie Englisch, Adrian Hoven	Comedy	
The White Horse Inn	Willi Forst	Johanna Matz, Johannes Heesters, Rudolf Forster	Musical	
You Only Live Once	Ernst Neubach	Theo Lingen, Marina Ried, Rudolf Platte	Comedy	

== Bibliography ==
- Davidson, John & Hake, Sabine. Framing the Fifties: Cinema in a Divided Germany. Berghahn Books, 2007.
- Fehrenbach, Heide. Cinema in Democratizing Germany: Reconstructing National Identity After Hitler. University of North Carolina Press, 1995.

== See also ==
- List of Austrian films of 1952
- List of East German films of 1952
