= Holiday in Tyrol =

1956 film

- Directed by: Wolfgang Schleif
- Written by: Harry R. Sokal; Lisa Tetzner (novel); Wolfgang Wilhelm
- Produced by: Harry R. Sokal
- Starring: Hans Söhnker; Edith Mill; Michael Ande
- Cinematography: Igor Oberberg
- Edited by: Hermann Ludwig
- Music by: Mark Lothar
- Production company: Sokal-Film
- Distributed by: Schorcht Filmverleih
- Release date: 8 March 1956
- Running time: 100 minutes
- Country: West Germany
- Language: German

Holiday in Tyrol (German: Ferien in Tirol or Zärtliches Geheimnis) is a 1956 West German drama film directed by Wolfgang Schleif and starring Hans Söhnker, Edith Mill and Michael Ande. It was shot at the Bavaria Studios in Munich and on location in Bavaria, Austria and Switzerland. The film's sets were designed by the art directors Hans Ledersteger and Ernst Richter.

== Main cast ==
- Hans Söhnker as Robert von Stetten
- Edith Mill as Anna Retzer
- Michael Ande as Rosmarin von Stetten / Thymian Retzer
- Therese Giehse as Mutter Lindner, Witwe
- Irene von Meyendorff as Charlie
- Beppo Brem as Bürgermeister Kunzel
- Wastl Witt as Herr Kramer
- Lina Carstens as Frau Kramer
- William Trenk as Franz, Diener
- Petra Unkel as Vroni
- Marianne Brandt as Huberbäuerin
- Bruno Hübner as Dorflehrer
- Erika von Thellmann as Frieda
- Erna Großmann as Klara
- Maren Bielenberg as Beate

== Bibliography ==
- Parish, James Robert. Film Actors Guide. Scarecrow Press, 1977.
