= Dear Miss Doctor =

1954 film directed by Hans H. König

- Directed by: Hans H. König
- Written by: Werner Eplinius; Janne Furch
- Produced by: Richard König
- Starring: Edith Mill; Hans Nielsen; Helmut Schmid
- Cinematography: Kurt Hasse
- Edited by: Adolf Schlyssleder
- Music by: Werner R. Heymann
- Production company: König Film
- Distributed by: Kopp-Filmverleih
- Release date: 2 December 1954
- Running time: 88 minutes
- Country: West Germany
- Language: German

Dear Miss Doctor (German: Geliebtes Fräulein Doktor) is a 1954 West German romantic comedy film directed by Hans H. König and starring Edith Mill, Hans Nielsen and Helmut Schmid.

It was shot at the Bavaria Studios in Munich. The film's sets were designed by the art directors Hertha Hareiter and Otto Pischinger.

== Synopsis ==
Students at a boarding school write a series of love letters between their attractive female teacher and one of the male sports teachers. This leads to confusion and embarrassment before the two realize that they are truly in love.

== Cast ==
- Edith Mill as Dr. Maria Hofer
- Hans Nielsen as Direktor Dr. Franke
- Helmut Schmid as Dr. Hans Klinger
- Robert Freitag as Pater Anselmus
- Hans Clarin as Cicero, Klassenprimus
- Lina Carstens as Oberin des Klosters
- Gusti Kreissl as Luise Franke
- Wastl Witt as Pedell Korbinian
- Hermann Pfeiffer as Mathematikprofessor
- Arnulf Schröder
- Michael Rabanus as Sprachlehrer
- Alex Weber as Zeichenlehrer
- Karl Schaidler as Lehrer
- Petra Unkel as Friseuse
- Hanna Wördy as Dienstmädchen
- Axel Arens
- Christian Doermer
- Dan Calinescu
- Michael Eder
- Dieter Kunheim
- Herbert Lauterbach
- Günther Lynen
- Moritz Milar
- Ali Pery
- Franz Simon
- Peter Tost
- Fred Staal

== Bibliography ==
- Bock, Hans-Michael & Bergfelder, Tim. The Concise CineGraph. Encyclopedia of German Cinema. Berghahn Books, 2009.
