= Everything for the Company =

Everything for the Company may refer to:

- Everything for the Company (1935 film), an Austrian comedy film
- Everything for the Company (1950 film), a West German comedy film
