= Trouble in Paradise (1950 film) =

1950 film

- Directed by: Joe Stöckel
- Written by: Joe Stöckel
- Starring: Olga Chekhova; Trude Hesterberg; Trude Haefelin
- Cinematography: Paul Grupp
- Edited by: Luise Dreyer-Sachsenberg
- Music by: Werner Bochmann
- Production company: Venus-Film Olga Tschechowa
- Distributed by: Falken-Filmverleih
- Release date: 1 September 1950
- Running time: 95 minutes
- Country: West Germany
- Language: German

Trouble in Paradise (German: Aufruhr im Paradies) is a 1950 West German comedy film directed by Joe Stöckel and starring Olga Chekhova, Trude Hesterberg and Trude Haefelin. It was shot at the Bavaria Studios in Munich and on location in Mittenwald and Grainau. The film's sets were designed by the art directors Rudolf Pfenninger and Max Seefelder.

== Cast ==
- Olga Chekhova as Myriam Esneh
- Trude Hesterberg as Ulrike Möller
- Trude Haefelin as Zenzi Pointner
- Elfie Pertramer as Kathi
- Olly Gubo as Iris Mehltreter
- Viktor Staal as Hans Soltau
- Joe Stöckel as Ignaz Pointner
- Beppo Brem as Wastl
- Rudolf Reiff as Hannibal Möller
- Heini Göbel as Stieglitz, gen. Leporello
- Walter Kiaulehn
- Willem Holsboer
- Ernst Rotmund as Preßburger
- Waldemar Frahm
- Alfred Pongratz as Bader-Simmerl
- Franz Fröhlich
- Franz Loskarn
- Ernst Schönle
- Hermann Goebel
- Hubert von Meyerinck

== Bibliography ==
- Oliver Ohmann. Heinz Rühmann und "Die Feuerzangenbowle": die Geschichte eines Filmklassikers. Lehmstedt, 2010.
