= As the Sea Rages =

1959 film

- Directed by: Horst Hächler
- Screenplay by: Jeffrey Dell; Jo Eisinger; Walter Ulbrich
- Based on: Raubfischer in Hellas by Werner Helwig
- Produced by: Carl Szokoll
- Starring: Maria Schell; Cliff Robertson; Cameron Mitchell
- Cinematography: Kurt Hasse
- Edited by: Arnfried Heyne
- Music by: Friedrich Meyer
- Production companies: Columbia Pictures; Dubrava Film; Michael Arthur Films; Tele Film; Zagreb Film
- Distributed by: Columbia Film-Verleih; Columbia Pictures (US)
- Release date: November 5, 1959
- Running time: 104 minutes
- Countries: West Germany; Yugoslavia; Liechtenstein; United States
- Languages: German; English

As the Sea Rages (German: Raubfischer in Hellas) is a 1959 drama film directed by Horst Hächler and starring Maria Schell, Cliff Robertson and Cameron Mitchell. It is based on Werner Helwig's novel Raubfischer in Hellas. It was shot on location on the Dalmatian Coast. The film's sets were designed by the art directors Hertha Hareiter and Otto Pischinger.

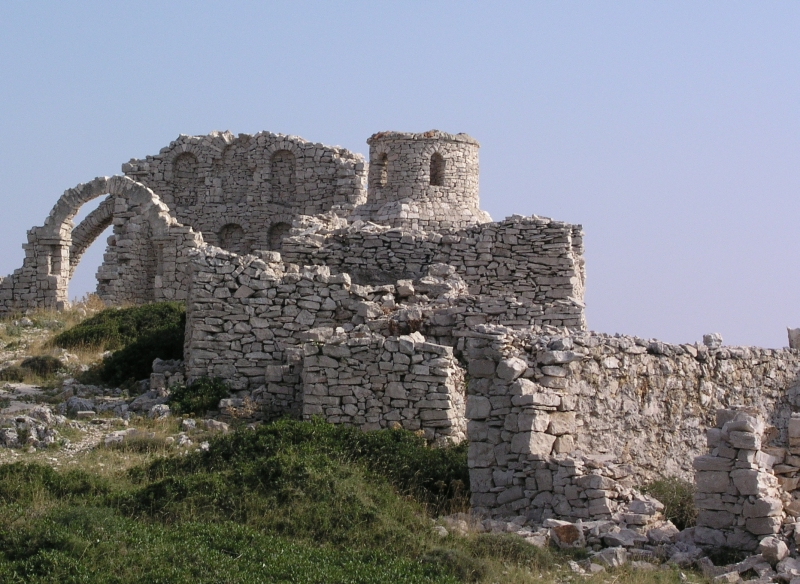
The remains of a movie set on Croatian island of Mana, Kornati archipelago, are a popular tourist attraction

== Cast ==
- Maria Schell as Mana
- Cliff Robertson as Clements
- Cameron Mitchell as Psarathanas
- Peter Carsten as Panagos
- Fritz Tillmann as Captain Stassi
- Ivan Kostic as Samsarello
- Nikola Popovic as Barbanji
- Dušan Vuisić as Pope

== Production ==
Cliff Robertson was under contract to Columbia Pictures at the time.

== Reception ==
Leonard Maltin awarded the film two stars.
