= Willy Trenk-Trebitsch =

Australian actor

Willy Trenk-Trebitsch (March 11, 1902 – September 21, 1983) was an Austrian actor.

He was born in Vienna. He was especially famous for his performances as Mack the Knife in The Threepenny Opera; he also had a film career. He died in Berlin, aged 85.

== Partial filmography ==
- Panic in Chicago (1931) - Kriminalbeamter Charles
- The Other Side (1931) - Koch
- Einer Frau muß man alles verzeih'n (1931) - Fritz Meyer, Konfektionsreisender
- Her Majesty, Love (1931) - Minor Role (uncredited)
- Rasputin, Demon with Women (1932) - Ossipowitsch, Rasputins Sekretär
- The Strange Death of Adolf Hitler (1943) - Col. Von Zechwitz
- Hitchhike to Happiness (1945) - Ladislaus Prenska
- Inside Job (1946) - Cordet
- The Searching Wind (1946) - Ponette
- White Tie and Tails (1946) - Emil
- I'll Be Yours (1947) - Captain
- The Guilt of Janet Ames (1947) - Headwaiter (uncredited)
- The Corpse Came C.O.D. (1947) - Fields
- The Exile (1947) - Jacques - Footman
- Cass Timberlane (1947) - Raveau (uncredited)
- Letter from an Unknown Woman (1948) - Fritzel (uncredited)
- My Sister and I (1954) - König
- They Were So Young (1954) - Senor Bulanos
- The Eternal Waltz (1954) - Leibrock - Kammerdiener
- Holiday in Tyrol (1956) - Franz, Diener
- Der Schinderhannes (1958) - Reichsgraf von Cleve-Boost
- Heldinnen (1960) - Ricaut
- Question 7 (1961)
- Karl May (1974) - Rodolf Lebius (final film role)
