= Hertha Hareiter =

Austrian art director

- Born: 28 May 1923; Vienna, Austria
- Died: 31 July 2015 (aged 92)
- Occupation: Art director
- Years active: 1951-2000 (film)

Hertha Hareiter (1923 - 2015) was an Austrian art director. She designed the sets for a huge number of films in the postwar years. She was married to the fellow set designer Otto Pischinger and often collaborated with him.

== Selected filmography ==
- The Confession of Ina Kahr (1954)
- Dear Miss Doctor (1954)
- Marriage Impostor (1954)
- A Heart Full of Music (1955)
- Royal Hunt in Ischl (1955)
- My Aunt, Your Aunt (1956)
- Old Heidelberg (1959)
- Peter Voss, Hero of the Day (1959)
- Rendezvous in Vienna (1959)
- As the Sea Rages (1959)
- Final Accord (1960)
- The Dream of Lieschen Mueller (1961)
- It Can't Always Be Caviar (1961)
- This Time It Must Be Caviar (1961)
- The Marriage of Mr. Mississippi (1961)
- The Turkish Cucumbers (1962)
- Snow White and the Seven Jugglers (1962)
- And So to Bed (1963)
- Is Geraldine an Angel? (1963)
- The Last Ride to Santa Cruz (1964)
- Condemned to Sin (1964)
- Full Hearts and Empty Pockets (1964)
- The Pyramid of the Sun God (1965)
- DM-Killer (1965)
- The Treasure of the Aztecs (1965)
- Congress of Love (1966)
- How to Seduce a Playboy (1966)
- Maigret and His Greatest Case (1966)
- Two Girls from the Red Star (1966)
- The Castle (1968)
- Madame and Her Niece (1969)
- The Salzburg Connection (1972)
- The Winds of War (1983, TV series)

== Bibliography ==
Sarah Miles Bolam & Thomas J. Bolam. The Presidents on Film: A Comprehensive Filmography of Portrayals from George Washington to George W. Bush. McFarland & Company, 2007.
