= Hermann Pfeiffer (actor) =

German actor

- Born: 6 May 1902; Elberfeld, German Empire
- Died: 11 July 1969 (aged 67); Cologne, West Germany
- Occupations: Actor, Director
- Years active: 1936–1964 (film & TV)

Hermann Pfeiffer (1902–1969) was a German stage and film actor. He also directed several films including Counterfeiters (1940).

== Selected filmography ==
=== Actor ===
- Doctor Engel (1936)
- Truxa (1937)
- When Women Keep Silent (1937)
- The Yellow Flag (1937)
- The Ways of Love Are Strange (1937)
- The Chief Witness (1937)
- Talking About Jacqueline (1937)
- The Coral Princess (1937)
- The Irresistible Man (1937)
- Autobus S (1937)
- Nanon (1938)
- The Man Who Couldn't Say No (1938)
- The Muzzle (1938)
- The Stars Shine (1938)
- Red Orchids (1938)
- By a Silken Thread (1938)
- Five Million Look for an Heir (1938)
- Napoleon Is to Blame for Everything (1938)
- What Now, Sibylle? (1938)
- Kitty and the World Conference (1939)
- Alarm at Station III (1939)
- The Desert Song (1939)
- The Strange Woman (1939)
- The Right to Love (1939)
- Woman Made to Measure (1940)
- Everything for Gloria (1941)
- Diesel (1942)
- Front Theatre (1942)
- Circus Renz (1943)
- Back Then (1943)
- The Golden Spider (1943)
- The Wedding Hotel (1944)
- Czardas of Hearts (1951)
- Woe to Him Who Loves (1951)
- The Exchange (1952)
- I Can't Marry Them All (1952)
- Diary of a Married Woman (1953)
- The Last Waltz (1953)
- They Call It Love (1953)
- The Little Town Will Go to Sleep (1954)
- Guitars of Love (1954)
- School for Marriage (1954)
- Dear Miss Doctor (1954)

=== Director ===
- Counterfeiters (1940)
- Search for Majora (1949)
- Inspector Hornleigh Intervenes (1961, TV series)

== Bibliography ==
- Giesen, Rolf (2003). Nazi Propaganda Films: A History and Filmography. Jefferson, NC: McFarland. ISBN 978-0-7864-3870-9.
