= The Mill in the Black Forest =

1953 film

- Directed by: Hermann Kugelstadt
- Written by: Johannes Kai; Hermann Kugelstadt
- Produced by: Richard König
- Starring: Edith Mill; Helmuth Schneider; Albert Hehn
- Cinematography: Bruno Stephan
- Edited by: Luise Dreyer-Sachsenberg
- Music by: Werner Bochmann
- Production company: König Film
- Distributed by: Kopp-Filmverleih
- Release date: 18 September 1953
- Running time: 100 minutes
- Country: West Germany
- Language: German

The Mill in the Black Forest (German: Die Mühle im Schwarzwäldertal) is a 1953 West German drama film directed by Hermann Kugelstadt and starring Edith Mill, Helmuth Schneider and Albert Hehn. It was shot at the Bavaria Studios in Munich. The film's sets were designed by the art director Max Seefelder. Location shooting took place at Furtwangen in the Black Forest and Bingen on the Rhine.

== Cast ==
- Edith Mill as Gertrud
- Helmuth Schneider as Paul Kemper
- Albert Hehn as Philipp Kemper
- Fritz Rasp as Hotel-Oigatemr Rapp
- Ruth Lommel as Frau Schulze
- Ernst Waldow as Herr Schulze
- Albert Florath as Kabideen Himpel
- Beppo Brem as Mahlmoischtr Sepp

== Bibliography ==
- Hans-Michael Bock and Tim Bergfelder. The Concise Cinegraph: An Encyclopedia of German Cinema. Berghahn Books, 2009.
