= Trude Haefelin =

German actress (1914–2008)

- Born: Gertrud Margaretha Franziska Haefelin; 1 July 1914; Passau, German Empire
- Died: 3 October 2008 (aged 94); Bruckmühl, Bavaria, Germany
- Occupation: Actress
- Years active: 1930-1954

Trude Haefelin (1 July 1914 – 3 October 2008) was a German film and stage actress.

== Biography ==
Haefelin grew up in Munich-Schwabing as a half-ore after the father had fallen in the First World War. She attended the Lyzeum of the English Miss in Wasserburg am Inn and received acting lessons at the Otto Falckenberg School in Munich. She made her stage debut at the Schauspielhaus Munich at the age of 16. She soon came to Berlin, where she appeared at the Rose Theater, at the theater on Nollendorfplatz, at the Deutsches Theater and at the Schillertheater under Heinrich George.

From 1932, Haefelin participated in many film productions in often extensive supporting roles. She was often seen as "the lovely appendage of Bavarian original people" or as "the second woman, the naive, the lover". After the end of the war, she continued her film career for several years. In her last feature film Rosen-Resli from 1954, she played one of two women who made the farm a heavy slide (Arno Assmann) at the same time.

Haefelin was married to the producer Willy Constantin. In the second marriage, she married cabaret artist and actor Jürgen Scheller (1922–1996) in 1957. With him, she went on tour after her film career ended. Among other things, she appeared in the Hamburg chamber games. In 1974, she founded the Paul Klinger artist social work (Paul Klinger in honor) with Scheller. She spent her last years in a retirement home in Bruckmühl, where she died in 2008. She was buried in the Perlach cemetery, in which her second husband had already been buried.

== Selected filmography ==
- Music in the Blood (1934)
- Regine (1935)
- Girls in White (1936)
- Gordian the Tyrant (1937)
- The Right to Love (1939)
- Beloved World (1942)
- Andreas Schlüter (1942)
- Trouble in Paradise (1950)
- Two in One Suit (1950)
- Once on the Rhine (1952)
- Rose-Girl Resli (1954)

== Bibliography ==
- Giesen, Rolf. Nazi Propaganda Films: A History and Filmography. McFarland & Company, 2003.
