= Love on Ice (film) =

1950 film

- Directed by: Kurt Meisel
- Written by: Johannes Kai; Anton Schelkopf; Helmuth M. Backhaus
- Produced by: Helmuth Schönnenbeck
- Starring: Margot Hielscher; Kurt Meisel; Hannelore Bollmann
- Cinematography: Bertl Höcht; Josef Illig; Heinz Schnackertz
- Edited by: Anneliese Schönnenbeck
- Music by: Friedrich Meyer
- Production company: HMK Film
- Distributed by: Continental Filmverleih
- Release date: 4 August 1950
- Running time: 92 minutes
- Country: West Germany
- Language: German

Love on Ice (German: Liebe auf Eis) is a 1950 West German romance film directed by Kurt Meisel and starring Margot Hielscher, Kurt Meisel and Hannelore Bollmann. It also features the ice hockey teams SC Riessersee and EV Füssen. It was shot at the Bavaria Studios in Munich. The film's sets were designed by the art directors Robert Herlth, Max Mellin and Willy Schatz.

== Cast ==
- Margot Hielscher as Angelika Langhoff
- Kurt Meisel as Toni Staudtner
- Charlotte Witthauer as Charlotte Pappke
- Hannelore Bollmann as Jeanette Bergmann
- Friedrich Schoenfelder as Birger Sörensen
- Kurt Waitzmann as Kurt Frischauf
- Hubert von Meyerinck as Hoteldirektor Schabratzky
- Rudolf Schündler as Dr. Siegfried Bergmann
- Gunther Philipp as Max
- Heinz Erhardt as Fabrikant Meyer
- Peter Wolf as Peter Langhoff
- Sepp Nigg as Heini
- Otto Friebel as Otto
- Hans Stadtmüller as Portier

== Bibliography ==
- Hans-Michael Bock and Tim Bergfelder. The Concise Cinegraph: An Encyclopedia of German Cinema. Berghahn Books, 2009.
