= Two Bavarians in St. Pauli =

1956 film directed by Hermann Kugelstadt

- Directed by: Hermann Kugelstadt
- Written by: Eberhard Itzenplitz; Hans H. König; Hans Lacmüller
- Produced by: Hans H. König; Richard König; Edgar Röll
- Starring: Joe Stöckel; Beppo Brem; Lucie Englisch
- Cinematography: Erich Küchler
- Edited by: Luise Dreyer-Sachsenberg
- Music by: Werner Bochmann
- Production company: König Film
- Distributed by: Kopp-Filmverleih
- Release date: 27 November 1956
- Running time: 95 minutes
- Country: West Germany
- Language: German

Two Bavarians in St. Pauli (German: Zwei Bayern in St. Pauli) is a 1956 West German comedy film directed by Hermann Kugelstadt and starring Joe Stöckel, Beppo Brem and Lucie Englisch.

The film's sets were designed by the art director Hans Sohnle and Hans Strobel. It was shot partly on location in Hamburg including at Hagenbeck's Tierpark.

It was followed by three sequels between 1957 and 1962.

== Cast ==
- Joe Stöckel as Ferdinand Lechner
- Beppo Brem as Karl Köpfle
- Lucie Englisch as Kathi Lechner
- Franz Muxeneder as Max
- Ernst Waldow as Eugen Hempel
- Ruth Lommel as Gloria von Merlen
- Michl Lang as Sepp Holzner
- Alexander Golling as Hieronymous Huber
- Gaby Fehling as Bärbel Lechner
- Knut Ihne as Hans Holzner
- Gusti Kreissl as Frau Knöpfle
- Petra Unkel as Fanny
- Rudolf Carl as Obermoser
- Jean Pierre Faye as Neger Theophil
- Bernhard Jakschatat as Gastwirt des "Alt-Bayern"
- Joseph Offenbach as Polizeikomissar
- Franz Loskarn as Dullinger
- Horst Loska as Kirchbacher
- Hans von Morhart as Landrat
- Adi Ferber as Chef im Schiffsereisebüro
- Walter Pötters as Photograph im Zoo
- Gert Wiedenhofen as Kellner im "Grünen Hai"
- Rolf Kralovitz as Photograph im "Grünen Hai"
- Walter Ladengast as Zoowärter
- Beppo Schwaiger as Zoowärter
- Joe Rivé as Portier im "Grünen Hai"

== Bibliography ==
- Beni Eppenberger & Daniel Stapfer. Mädchen, Machos und Moneten: die unglaubliche Geschichte des SchweizerKinounternehmers Erwin C. Dietrich. Verlag Scharfe Stiefel, 2006.
