= Legion Condor (film) =

1939 film

- Directed by: Karl Ritter
- Written by: Felix Lützkendorf; Karl Ritter
- Produced by: Karl Ritter
- Starring: Paul Hartmann; Albert Hehn; Fritz Kampers
- Cinematography: Günther Anders
- Edited by: Gottfried Ritter
- Music by: Herbert Windt
- Production company: UFA
- Release date: 1939
- Country: Nazi Germany
- Language: German

Legion Condor is a 1939 German war film directed by Karl Ritter and starring Paul Hartmann, Albert Hehn and Fritz Kampers. The film portrays the German Condor Legion, which fought in the Spanish Civil War. Because of the German-Soviet Pact, the production was halted after 15 days of shooting, on 25 August 1939, to avoid offending the Soviets, who had supported the other side in Spain and were negatively portrayed in the film. Karl Ritter's diary entry that day stated that Hermann Göring had called the Ufa studio to tell him to abort the film.

The film is often confused with the full-length documentary film by Karl Ritter, Im Kampf Gegen den Weltfeind (In the Battle against World Enemy #1), released on 15 June 1939 on the same subject. Legion Condor was planned as a sequel to Ritter's highly successful 1938 feature film, Pour le Merite, also starring Paul Hartmann, Albert Hehn, Fritz Kampers, Carsta Löck, amongst others.

In August 2018 the long-lost Ufa film script was found in a used bookstore in Berlin. No copy of the script is found in any German film archive or institution. A monograph on the film has been published by William Gillespie, titled Legion Condor – Karl Ritter's lost 1939 feature film.

== Cast ==
- Paul Hartmann as Kommandant der Jagdflieger
- Albert Hehn as Jagdflieger
- Fritz Kampers as Oberfeldwebel Moebius
- Josef Dahmen as Unteroffizier
- Willi Rose as Unteroffizier
- Otto Graf
- Karl John
- Wolfgang Staudte
- Heinz Welzel
- Herbert A.E. Bohme
- Carsta Löck
- Marina von Ditmar
- Ernst Bader
- Dima Detoor
- Andrews Engelmann
- Irene Fischer
- Friedrich Gnaß
- Lutz Götz
- Malte Jäger
- Karl Klüsner
- Franz Kossak
- Lothar Körner
- Lea Niako
- Ruth Nimbach
- Lili Schoenborn-Anspach
- Ursula Ulrich
- Ernst von Klipstein

== Bibliography ==
- Kreimeier, Klaus (1999). The Ufa Story: A History of Germany's Greatest Film Company, 1918–1945. University of California Press. ISBN 978-0-520-22069-0.
- Gillespie, William (2014). Karl Ritter: His Life and 'Zeitfilms' Under National Socialism (2nd ed.). German Films Dot Net. ISBN 978-0-9808612-2-8.
