= Three Birch Trees on the Heath =

1956 film by Ulrich Erfurth

- Directed by: Ulrich Erfurth
- Written by: Erich Engels; Wolf Neumeister
- Produced by: Walter Koppel; Gyula Trebitsch
- Starring: Margit Saad; Sonja Sutter; Helmuth Schneider
- Cinematography: Willy Winterstein
- Edited by: Ilse Voigt
- Music by: Siegfried Franz
- Production company: Real Film
- Distributed by: J. Arthur Rank Film
- Release date: 30 November 1956
- Running time: 87 minutes
- Country: West Germany
- Language: German

Three Birch Trees on the Heath (German: Drei Birken auf der Heide) is a 1956 West German drama film directed by Ulrich Erfurth and starring Margit Saad, Sonja Sutter and Helmuth Schneider. It was one of 54 heimatfilm pictures produced that year, as the genre's popularity reached its peak.

The film's sets were designed by the art director Dieter Bartels. The film was shot at the Wandsbek Studios in Hamburg and on location around Lüneburg Heath outside the city.

== Cast ==
- Margit Saad as Susanna, Zigeunerin
- Sonja Sutter as Rose Heidkämper
- Helmuth Schneider as Hans Freese, Revierförster
- Albert Matterstock as Jan Wedekind, Verleger
- Rolf Wanka as Ernö, Zigeunerprimas
- Irene von Meyendorff as Ada Wedekind
- Paul Henckels as Vater Heidkämper, Imker
- Albert Florath as Pastor Mettelmann
- Carsta Löck as Meta, Haushälterin bei Wedekind
- Robert Meyn as Rackebrand, Forstmeister
- Hubert Hilten as Mirko, junger Zigeuner
- Bum Krüger as Kriminalassistent Grimm
- Balduin Baas as Plaskude
- Jochen Meyn as Sterthus, Hilfsförster
- Hans Schwarz Jr. as Oldehoff, Torfbauer
- Lore Schulz as Trina, Dorfmädchen
- Hans Fitze as Ahrens, Gemeindevorsteher
- Werner Schumacher as Born, Wachtmeister
- Peter Ahrweiler as Ein Beamter
- Kerstin De Ahna as Dörte, Dorfmädchen
- Maria Litto as Jolan, Zigeunerin
- Alma Auler as Telefonistin
- Ronni Fischer as Geza, ein junger Zigeuner
- Erica Schramm as Krankenschwester
- Mita von Ahlefeldt as Frau Mettelmann
- August Weiß as Istvan, Stammesältester der Zigeuner

== Bibliography ==
- Elizabeth Boa & Rachel Palfreyman. Heimat - A German Dream: Regional Loyalties and National Identity in German Culture 1890-1990. OUP Oxford, 21 Sep 2000.
