= Elfie Pertramer =

German actress (1924–2011)

- Born: 18 November 1924; Munich, Bavaria, Germany
- Died: 16 November 2011 (aged 86); Munich, Bavaria, Germany
- Occupation: Actress
- Years active: 1950-1974 (film)

Elfie Pertramer (1924–2011) was a German stage and film actress. Born in Munich, she appeared in a number of films, particularly comedies, with a Bavarian theme.

== Selected filmography ==
- Two in One Suit (1950)
- Trouble in Paradise (1950)
- The Exchange (1952)
- The Crucifix Carver of Ammergau (1952)
- Two People (1952)
- Marriage Strike (1953)
- The Big Star Parade (1954)
- Three Days Confined to Barracks (1955)
- Urlaub auf Ehrenwort (1955)
- When the Alpine Roses Bloom (1955)
- Yes, Yes, Love in Tyrol (1955)
- Where the Ancient Forests Rustle (1956)
- Two Bavarians in the Harem (1957)
- Hula-Hopp, Conny (1959)
- Max the Pickpocket (1962)
- When You're With Me (1970)
- Einer spinnt immer (1971)
- Onkel Filser – Allerneueste Lausbubengeschichten (1966)
- Schwarzwaldfahrt aus Liebeskummer (1974)

== Bibliography ==
- Willi Höfig. Der deutsche Heimatfilm 1947-1960. 1973.
