= Alexander Golling =

German actor (1905–1989)

- Born: 2 August 1905; Munich, German Empire
- Died: 26 February 1989 (aged 83); Rottach-Egern, West Germany
- Occupation: Actor
- Years active: 1935–1983

Alexander Golling (August 2, 1905 – February 26, 1989) was a German actor. Golling was a member of the Nazi Party.

== Selected filmography ==
- Streak of Steel (1935) – Zöger
- Joan of Arc (1935) – English Knight
- The Private Life of Louis XIV (1935) – General Mélac
- One Too Many on Board (1935) – Kommissar Sörensen
- The Call of the Jungle (1936) – William Edwards
- Michel Strogoff (1936) – Iwan Ogareff
- The Kaiser of California (1936) – Kewen - Bürgermeister von San Franzisko
- Ninety Minute Stopover (1936) – Conny Steven
- Men Without a Fatherland (1937) – Ischnikoff
- The Tiger of Eschnapur (1938) – Prinz Ramigani, Vetter des Maharadscha
- The Indian Tomb (1938) – Prinz Ramigani, Vetter des Maharadscha
- Travelling People (1938) – Ganove Tino
- Sergeant Berry (1938) – Evans
- Dreizehn Mann und eine Kanone (1938)
- Gold in New Frisco (1939) – Jim de Lacy
- Comrades (1941) – Marschall Davout
- Secret File W.B.1 (1942) – Wilhelm Bauer
- Chased by the Devil (1950) – Martin Karper
- Immortal Beloved (1951) – Wulf von Hollstein
- Prosecutor Corda (1953) – Gerichtspräsident
- The Little Town Will Go to Sleep (1954) – Bürgermeister
- School for Marriage (1954) – Boris Salmon
- Marriage Impostor (1954) – Kriminalrat Dr. Maurer
- Ball of Nations (1954) – Scrjabin
- The Golden Plague (1954) – Hamann
- Hello, My Name is Cox (1955) – Gangster Toop
- The Major and the Bulls (1955) – Landrat Spiegel
- Der Teufel mit den drei goldenen Haaren (1955)
- In Hamburg When the Nights Are Long (1956)
- The Golden Bridge (1956) – Bessing
- Santa Lucia (1956) – Bärtiger
- Two Bavarians in St. Pauli (1956) – Hieronymous Huber
- Queen Louise (1957) – Großfürst Konstantin
- Gangsterjagd in Lederhosen (1959) – Ramiro
- A Summer You Will Never Forget (1959) – Konsul Leuchtenthal
- My Schoolfriend (1960) – Krögelmeier
- Headquarters State Secret (1960) – Ein Gauleiter
- No Shooting Time for Foxes (1966) – An Uncle
- Hurra, die Schule brennt – Die Lümmel von der ersten Bank IV. Teil (1969) – Blaumeier
- Das Glöcklein unterm Himmelbett (1970) – Johann Baptist Kloiber
- All People Will Be Brothers (1973) – Bauer
- The Hunter of Fall (1974) – Grenzbauer
- The Odessa File (1974) – Colonel
- Karl May (1974) – Fischer
- Die Jugendstreiche des Knaben Karl (1977) – Kommerzienrat

== Bibliography ==
- Hadley, Michael L. Count Not the Dead: The Popular Image of the German Submarine. McGill-Queen's University Press, 1995.
- London, John. Theatre Under the Nazis. Manchester University Press, 2000.
