= Bruno Stephan =

German cinematographer

- Born: 30 July 1907; Berlin, Prussia, German Empire
- Died: 5 January 1981 (aged 73); West Berlin, West Germany
- Occupation: Cinematographer
- Years active: 1931–1967 (film & TV)

Bruno Stephan (1907 – 1981) was a German cinematographer.

== Selected filmography ==
- Commissioner Eyck (1940)
- Left of the Isar, Right of the Spree (1940)
- The Big Game (1942)
- The Little Residence (1942)
- To Be God One Time (1942)
- My Friend Josephine (1942)
- Journey into the Past (1943)
- Paracelsus (1943)
- The Millionaire (1947)
- Insolent and in Love (1948)
- Law of Love (1949)
- Five Suspects (1950)
- A Rare Lover (1950)
- The Woman from Last Night (1950)
- Three Girls Spinning (1950)
- Stips (1951)
- I Was an Ugly Girl (1955)
- Queen of the Night (1951)
- Oh, You Dear Fridolin (1952)
- The Imaginary Invalid (1952)
- A Thousand Red Roses Bloom (1952)
- Knall and Fall as Detectives (1953)
- The Mill in the Black Forest (1953)
- Come Back (1953)
- The Beginning Was Sin (1954)
- Love's Carnival (1955)
- My Aunt, Your Aunt (1956)
- Inspector Hornleigh Intervenes (1961, TV)

== Bibliography ==
- Rolf Giesen. Nazi Propaganda Films: A History and Filmography. McFarland, 2003.
