= The Fisherman from Heiligensee =

1955 film directed by Hans H. König

- Directed by: Hans H. König
- Written by: Johannes Kai
- Produced by: Hans H. König; Richard König
- Starring: Edith Mill; Lil Dagover; Albert Lieven
- Cinematography: Günther Rittau
- Edited by: Gertrud Hinz-Nischwitz
- Music by: Werner Bochmann
- Production company: König Film
- Distributed by: Kopp-Filmverleih
- Release date: 16 September 1955
- Running time: 83 minutes
- Country: West Germany
- Language: German

The Fisherman from Heiligensee (German: Der Fischer vom Heiligensee) is a 1955 West German romantic comedy film directed by Hans H. König and starring Edith Mill, Lil Dagover and Albert Lieven. It was part of the post-war boom in heimatfilm pictures in Germany.

The film's sets were designed by the art director Max Seefelder. The film was shot on location in Austria and Bavaria and at the Bavaria Studios in Munich. It was made using Agfacolor.

== Cast ==
- Edith Mill as Baronesse Sabine von Velden
- Lil Dagover as Baronin Hermine von Velden
- Albert Lieven as Wolfgang von Döring
- Helmuth Schneider as Stefan Staudacher
- Anneliese Kaplan as Bärbel Altenburg
- Heinrich Gretler as Fischer-Bartl
- Beppo Brem as Beppo, Kutscher
- Siegfried Lowitz as Gilchert
- Anni Golz as Magd
- Ernst Firnholzer as Prokurist der Baufirma
- Ingeborg Christiansen as Dienstmädchen auf Gut Velden
- Michael Rabanus as Graphologe
- Liselotte Berker as Sekretärin der Baufirma
- Gardy Artinger as Kellnerin
- Petra Unkel
- Franz Fröhlich
- Alex Weber
- Uli Steigberg
- Georg Bauer

== Bibliography ==
- Von Moltke, Johannes. No Place Like Home: Locations Of Heimat In German Cinema. University of California Press, 2005.
