= Love and Trumpets (1954 film) =

1954 film

- Directed by: Helmut Weiss
- Written by: Fritz Böttger
- Produced by: Anton Schelkopf
- Starring: Hans Holt; Nadja Tiller; Marianne Koch
- Cinematography: Franz Koch
- Edited by: Adolph Schlyssleder
- Music by: Marc Roland
- Production company: Oska-Film
- Release date: 20 January 1954
- Running time: 93 minutes
- Country: West Germany
- Language: German

Love and Trumpets (German: Liebe und Trompetenblasen) is a 1954 West German musical comedy film directed by Helmut Weiss and starring Hans Holt, Nadja Tiller and Marianne Koch. It was shot at the Bavaria Studios in Munich and on location around Saló and Malcesine on Lake Garda in Italy. The film's sets were designed by the art director Ludwig Reiber.

== Synopsis ==
In a fictional European country just before the First World War, two womanising guards officers flirt endlessly with women. However, when Peter von Salis goes too far and compromises young noblewoman Bettina von Brixen, he is forced by the king to marry her. Meanwhile his friend Nikolaus is involved with the free-spirited dancer Ninon.

== Cast ==
- Hans Holt as Peter von Salis
- Nadja Tiller as Ninon Careli Star
- Marianne Koch as Bettina von Brixen
- Adolf Gondrell as Stahl
- Krista Keller as Therese
- Franz Muxeneder as Hupp
- Gunnar Möller as Nikolaus von Laffen
- Brigitte Rau
- Willy Reichert
- Sepp Rist
- Edith Schultze-Westrum as Frau von Barro
- Helen Vita
- Ernst Waldow as Oberst von Küchlin
- Helmut Weiss as Der Grossherzog Heinrich XVIII

== Bibliography ==
- Hans-Michael Bock and Tim Bergfelder. The Concise Cinegraph: An Encyclopedia of German Cinema. Berghahn Books.
