= Knall and Fall as Detectives =

1953 film

- German film poster
- Directed by: Hans Heinrich
- Written by: Philipp Lothar Mayring; Hannes Peter Stolp (novel)
- Starring: Hans Richter; Rudolf Carl; Ingrid Lutz
- Cinematography: Bruno Stephan
- Edited by: Ira Oberberg
- Music by: Bert Grund; Hans Lang
- Production companies: Arena-Film; Wiener Mundus-Film
- Distributed by: Herzog Film
- Release date: 29 May 1953
- Running time: 78 minutes
- Countries: Austria; West Germany
- Language: German

Knall and Fall as Detectives (German: Knall und Fall als Detektive) is a 1953 Austrian-West German comedy film directed by Hans Heinrich and starring Hans Richter, Rudolf Carl, and Ingrid Lutz. It was made as a sequel to the 1952 film Knall and Fall as Imposters. It was shot at the Spandau Studios in Berlin. The film's sets were designed by the art director Rolf Zehetbauer.

== Cast ==
- Hans Richter as Knall
- Rudolf Carl as Fall
- Fritz Wagner as Peter
- Ingrid Lutz as Lisa
- Ludwig Schmitz as Balduin Bornemann
- Bruno Hübner as Schmittchen
- Erika von Thellmann as Frau Schreyvogel
- Hubert von Meyerinck as Stapler
- Charlott Daudert as Lucie
- Joachim Teege as Dr. Klarwein
- Rolf Heydel
- Herbert Kiper
- Ewald Wenck
- Herbert Weissbach
- Ingeborg Wellmann
- Franz Stein as Professor Brott
- Reinhard Kolldehoff
- Otto Lengwinat
- Peter Schiff
- Egon Stief
