= Felix Lützkendorf =

German screenwriter

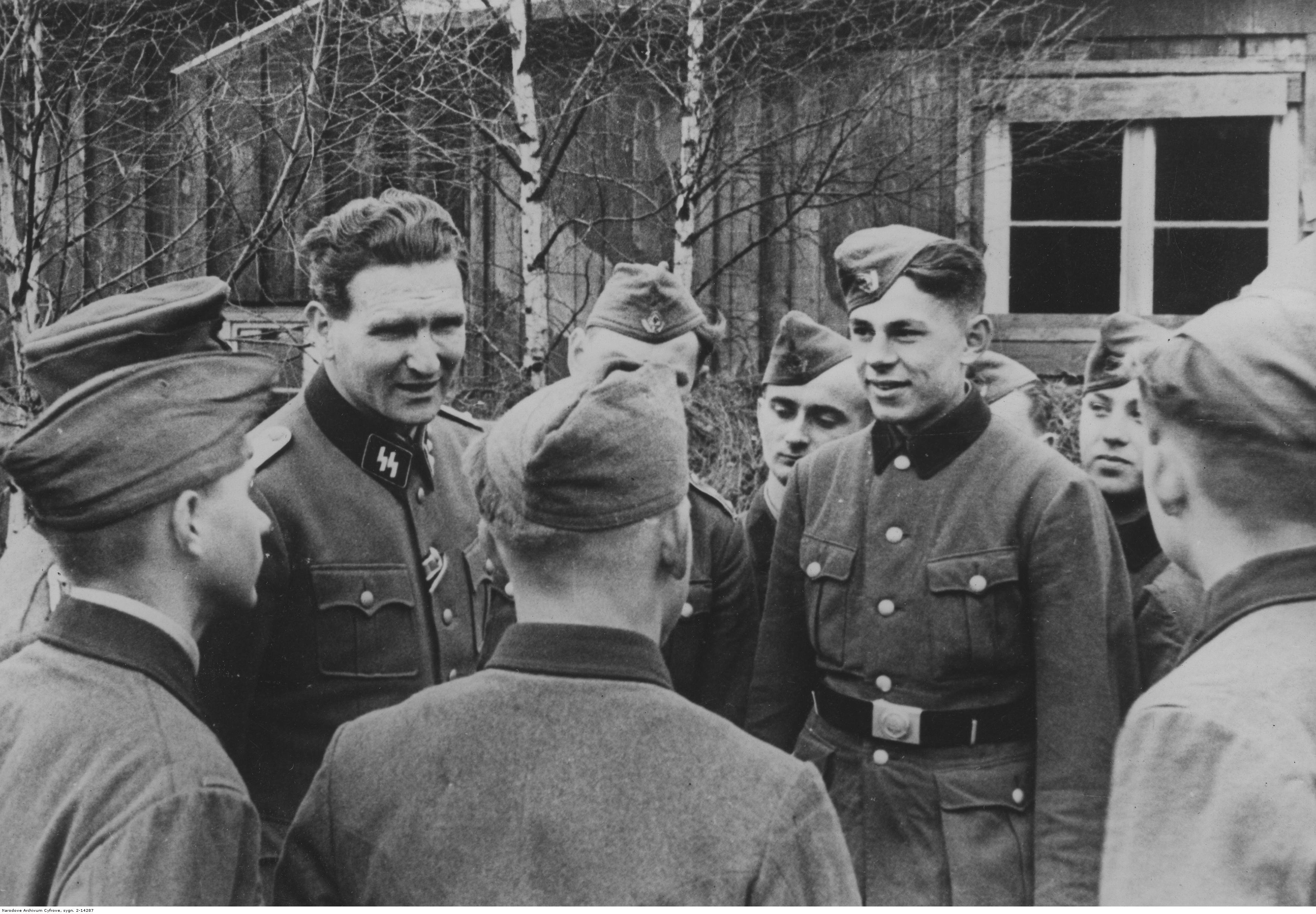
- Born: 2 February 1906; Leipzig, German Empire
- Died: 19 November 1990 (aged 84); Munich, Germany
- Occupation: Screenwriter
- Years active: 1937–1962 (film)

Felix Lützkendorf (1906–1990) was a German screenwriter and journalist. A member of the Nazi Party, he was active in Cinema of Germany during the Third Reich and in postwar West Germany. During the Second World War he worked as a war correspondent.

== Selected filmography ==
- Patriots (1937)
- Urlaub auf Ehrenwort (1938)
- Capriccio (1938)
- Covered Tracks (1938)
- Cadets (1939)
- The Wedding Trip (1939)
- Legion Condor (1939)
- The Eternal Spring (1940)
- Two Worlds (1940)
- Wunschkonzert (1940)
- Above All Else in the World (1941)
- Stukas (1941)
- The Red Terror (1942)
- Love Letters (1944)
- Fritz and Friederike (1952)
- House of Life (1952)
- Fanfare of Marriage (1953)
- Salto Mortale (1953)
- Fireworks (1954)
- Consul Strotthoff (1954)
- Ball of Nations (1954)
- They Were So Young (1954)
- The Life of Surgeon Sauerbruch (1954)
- Love Is Just a Fairytale (1955)
- Urlaub auf Ehrenwort (1955)
- The Barrings (1955)
- San Salvatore (1956)
- Das Mädchen Marion (1956)
- Different from You and Me (1957)
- Made in Germany (1957)
- Big Request Concert (1960)
- Ich kann nicht länger schweigen (1962)
- Der Teppich des Grauens (1962)

== Bibliography ==
- Noack, Frank. Veit Harlan: The Life and Work of a Nazi Filmmaker. University Press of Kentucky, 2016.
- Rother, Rainer (ed.) German Film: From the Archives of the Deutsche Kinemathek. Hatje Cantz Verlag, 2024.
- Welch, David. Propaganda and the German Cinema, 1933–1945. I.B.Tauris, 2001.
