= Adolf Schlyssleder =

German film editor

- Born: 28 June 1909; Munich, Bavaria, German Empire
- Died: 3 May 1995 (aged 85); Stephanskirchen, Bavaria, Germany
- Other name: Adolph Schlyssleder
- Occupations: Editor, Director
- Years active: 1936–1978 (film)

Adolf Schlyssleder or Adolph Schlyssleder (28 June 1909 – 3 May 1995) was a German film editor and assistant director. He also directed the 1942 comedy film Der Hochtourist. He spent his career working at the Bavaria Studios in his native Munich.

== Selected filmography ==
- Manja Valewska (1936)
- Peterle (1943)
- Between Yesterday and Tomorrow (1947)
- The Millionaire (1947)
- The Lost Face (1948)
- Beloved Liar (1950)
- Everything for the Company (1950)
- Kissing Is No Sin (1950)
- The Crucifix Carver of Ammergau (1952)
- Road to Home (1952)
- Marriage Strike (1953)
- The Monastery's Hunter (1953)
- Hubertus Castle (1954)
- Dear Miss Doctor (1954)
- Love and Trumpets (1954)
- School for Marriage (1954)
- Two Bavarians in the Harem (1957)
- Gräfin Mariza (1958)
- Mikosch, the Pride of the Company (1958)
- A Summer You Will Never Forget (1959)
- I Will Always Be Yours (1960)
- His Best Friend (1962)
- Full Hearts and Empty Pockets (1964)
- The Flying Classroom (1973)
- When Mother Went on Strike (1974)

== Bibliography ==
- Fritz, Raimund. Oskar Werner - das Filmbuch. Filmarchiv Austria, 2002.
- Reichmann, Hans-Peter. Curd Jürgens. Henschel, 2007.
