= Kurt Hasse (cinematographer) =

German cinematographer

- Born: 4 June 1916; Konigsberg, East Prussia, German Empire
- Died: 7 March 1999 (aged 82); Munich, Bavaria, Germany
- Occupation: Cinematographer
- Years active: 1936-1985 (film & TV)

Kurt Hasse (1916–1999) was a German cinematographer. Having started out as an assistant cameraman during the Nazi era, he was mainly active in postwar West German cinema and later in television.

== Selected filmography ==
- Artists' Blood (1949)
- I'm Waiting for You (1952)
- The Blue and White Lion (1952)
- Road to Home (1952)
- Beloved Life (1953)
- Such a Charade (1953)
- The Empress of China (1953)
- The Little Town Will Go to Sleep (1954)
- The Mosquito (1954)
- Marriage Impostor (1954)
- The Man of My Life (1954)
- Dear Miss Doctor (1954)
- Sky Without Stars (1955)
- My Father, the Actor (1956)
- My Ninety Nine Brides (1958)
- I Was All His (1958)
- All the Sins of the Earth (1958)
- As the Sea Rages (1959)
- Crime After School (1959)
- Until Money Departs You (1960)
- Boomerang (1960)
- Town Without Pity (1961)
- Life Begins at Eight (1962)
- Murder in Rio (1963)
- Situation Hopeless... But Not Serious (1965)
- Holidays in Tyrol (1971)

== Bibliography ==
- Giesen, Rolf. Nazi Propaganda Films: A History and Filmography. McFarland, 2003.
