= Two in One Suit =

1950 film directed by Joe Stöckel

- Directed by: Joe Stöckel
- Written by: Franz Seitz; Joe Stöckel
- Produced by: Oskar Marion
- Starring: Joe Stöckel; Wolf Albach-Retty; Olga Chekhova
- Cinematography: Josef Illig; Franz Koch
- Edited by: Luise Dreyer-Sachsenberg
- Music by: Hans Diernhammer
- Production company: Dornas-Film
- Distributed by: Deutsche Film Hansa
- Release date: 25 May 1950
- Running time: 95 minutes
- Country: West Germany
- Language: German

Two in One Suit (German: Zwei in einem Anzug) is a 1950 West German comedy film directed by Joe Stöckel and starring Stöckel, Wolf Albach-Retty and Olga Chekhova. It was shot at the Bavaria Studios in Munich and on location around Schwabing. The film's sets were designed by the art directors Rudolf Pfenninger and Max Seefelder.

== Cast ==
- Joe Stöckel as Thomas Bimslechner
- Wolf Albach-Retty as Otto Vogel
- Heini Göbel as Waldemar Zirngibl
- Olga Chekhova as Catherine Turner
- Rudolf Reiff as Nick Turner
- Hannes Keppler as "Baron" Egon
- Trude Haefelin as Luise Brandstötter
- Elise Aulinger as Frau Bimslechner
- Gilda Bauermeister as Bessy Turner
- Rudolf Vogel as Gerichtsvollzieher
- Elfie Pertramer
- Franz Loskarn as Schutzmann
- Beppo Brem as Dienstmann
- Ulla Best
- Wolf Harro
- Alfred Pongratz
- Thea Aichbichler

== Bibliography ==
- Stefanie Mathilde Frank. Wiedersehen im Wirtschaftswunder: Remakes von Filmen aus der Zeit des Nationalsozialismus in der Bundesrepublik 1949–1963. Vandenhoeck & Ruprecht, 2017.
