= Gold in New Frisco =

1939 film directed by Paul Verhoeven

- Directed by: Paul Verhoeven
- Written by: Axel Eggebrecht; Ernst Hasselbach
- Starring: Hans Söhnker; Alexander Golling; Otto Wernicke
- Cinematography: Otto Baecker; Carl Hoffmann
- Edited by: Gottlieb Madl
- Music by: Norbert Schultze
- Production company: Bavaria Film
- Distributed by: Bavaria Film
- Release date: 3 October 1939
- Running time: 97 minutes
- Country: Germany
- Language: German

Gold in New Frisco is a 1939 German adventure film directed by Paul Verhoeven and starring Hans Söhnker, Alexander Golling, and Otto Wernicke. It was one of a number of western-themed films made in Germany during the late 1930s including Sergeant Berry, Water for Canitoga, and The Kaiser of California. It was popular enough to be rereleased in 1949.

It was shot at the Bavaria Studios in Munich. The film's sets were designed by the art director Wilhelm Depenau and Ludwig Reiber.

== Cast ==
- Hans Söhnker as Frank Norton
- Alexander Golling as Jim de Lacy
- Otto Wernicke as Jonathan Pepper
- Anni Markart as Dolly Pepper
- Gustav Waldau as Burtons
- Ellen Frank as Kitty Burtons
- Hilde Jansen as Doris Burton
- Walter Lantzsch as Bronson
- Paul Westermeier as Watson
- Hans Hermann Schaufuß as Stones
- Carl Wery as McKinley
- Ernst Martens as Forges
- Alfons Teuber as Jack McGrather
- Gerhard Bienert as Ferguson
- Ludwig Schmid-Wildy as Dickson
- Walter Pose as Spencer
- Danny Guertler as Miller
- Franz Loskarn as Blodd
- Reinhold Lütjohann as Henry Manning
- Josef Eichheim as Mick

== Bibliography ==
- O'Brien, Mary-Elizabeth (2004). Nazi Cinema as Enchantment. The Politics of Entertainment in the Third Reich. Rochester, NY: Camden House. ISBN 978-1-57113-283-3.
