= Ilse Voigt (film editor) =

German film editor

- Occupation: Editor
- Years active: 1941-1973 (film & TV)

Ilse Voigt was a German film editor. She was active in German film and television between 1941 and 1973, a notable early female film technician in the country. She started her career during the Nazi era. After the Second World War she briefly worked for DEFA in the Eastern Zone, but thereafter worked in the West.

== Selected filmography ==
- A Gust of Wind (1942)
- My Friend Josephine (1942)
- I'll Carry You in My Arms (1943)
- Kohlhiesel's Daughters (1943)
- The Years Pass (1945)
- 1-2-3 Corona (1948)
- Girls in Gingham (1949)
- The Council of the Gods (1950)
- The Benthin Family (1950)
- A Heidelberg Romance (1951)
- Fritz and Friederike (1952)
- Three Days of Fear (1952)
- Captain Bay-Bay (1953)
- Christina (1953)
- The Mosquito (1954)
- The Man of My Life (1954)
- Canaris (1954)
- Sergeant Borck (1955)
- Urlaub auf Ehrenwort (1955)
- Three Birch Trees on the Heath (1956)
- Like Once Lili Marleen (1956)
- The Death Ship (1959)
- The True Jacob (1960)
- Robert and Bertram (1961)

== Bibliography ==
- Tim Bergfelder, Erica Carter & Deniz Göktürk. The German Cinema Book. BFI, 2002.
