= Final Accord (1960 film) =

1960 film

- Directed by: Wolfgang Liebeneiner
- Written by: Walter Forster; John H. Kafka; Carl Szokoll
- Produced by: Carl Szokoll
- Starring: Christian Marquand; Eleonora Rossi Drago; Viktor de Kowa
- Cinematography: Georg Bruckbauer
- Edited by: Ilse Wilken
- Music by: Georges Auric
- Production companies: Cosmos Film; Les Films Modernes; Tele-Film
- Distributed by: Gloria Film
- Release date: 23 December 1960
- Running time: 102 minutes
- Countries: France; Italy; West Germany
- Language: German

Final Accord or Final Chord (German: Schlußakkord) is a 1960 drama film directed by Wolfgang Liebeneiner and starring Christian Marquand, Eleonora Rossi Drago and Viktor de Kowa. It was made as a co-production between France, Italy and West Germany. It is a remake of the 1936 film of the same title by Douglas Sirk.

The film's sets were designed by the art directors Hertha Hareiter, Otto Pischinger and Wolf Witzemann. Location shooting took place around Salzburg, particularly at the Salzburg Festival.

== Cast ==
- Christian Marquand as Frank Leroux
- Eleonora Rossi Drago as Linda Valore
- Mario Del Monaco as Carlo del Monti
- Viktor de Kowa as Alexander von Berkin
- Marion Michael as Jacqueline Petersen
- Christian Wolff as Freddy
- Adeline Wagner as Josefine Wendelin
- Hans Reiser as Vladya Dupont
- Ljuba Welitsch as Louise
- Rudolf Carl as 'Höllenstein'-Wirt
- Hannsgeorg Laubenthal as Robert Michaelis
- Fritz Lafontaine as Kellner
- Hans Thimig as Dr. Thimm, Chefarzt

== Bibliography ==
- Robert, Reimer, & Reimer, Carol. The A to Z of German Cinema. Scarecrow Press, 2010.
