= Holidays in Tyrol =

1971 film

- German film poster
- German: Verliebte Ferien in Tirol
- Directed by: Harald Reinl
- Written by: Alfred Berger; Klaus E. R. von Schwarze; Harald Reinl; Kurt Nachmann
- Produced by: Walter Traut
- Starring: Uschi Glas; Hans-Jürgen Bäumler; Georg Thomalla
- Cinematography: Kurt Hasse; Ernst W. Kalinke
- Edited by: Jutta Neumann
- Music by: Martin Böttcher
- Production company: Divina-Film
- Distributed by: Gloria Film
- Release date: 1 October 1971
- Running time: 82 minutes
- Country: West Germany
- Language: German

Holidays in Tyrol (German: Verliebte Ferien in Tirol) is a 1971 West German comedy film directed by Harald Reinl and starring Uschi Glas, Hans-Jürgen Bäumler and Georg Thomalla.

The film's sets were designed by the art director Sepp Rothaur.

== Cast ==
- Uschi Glas as Dr. Karin Rothe
- Hans-Jürgen Bäumler as Stefan Hellwig
- Georg Thomalla as Christian Meier
- Rudolf Prack as Dr. Madesperger
- Beppo Brem as Schmied-Michel
- Erni Singerl as Marie Meier
- Trude Breitschopf as Oma Leithner
- Carl Lange as Consul Kersten
- Willy Meyer-Fuerst as Grandfather Leithner
- Bruno W. Pantel as engineer Wendehals
- Dagmar Hanauer as Monique Kersten
- Dorothea Carrera as receptionist
- Raoul Retzer as Dr. Türk
- Darja Müssiggang as Babsi Meier
- Alfred Litzinger as Peterl Leithner
- Toni Sailer as pump attendant Sepp
