= Ina Halley =

German actress

Ina Halley (January 9, 1927 – June 7, 1992) was a German actress.

== Selected filmography ==
- The Cuckoos (1949)
- The Merry Wives of Windsor (1950)
- Five Suspects (1950)
- Bluebeard (1951)
- The Prince of Pappenheim (1952)
- The Cousin from Nowhere (1953)
- The Bachelor Trap (1953)
- The Man of My Life (1954)
- The Faithful Hussar (1954)
- A Heart Full of Music (1955)
- The Last Chapter (1961)

== Bibliography ==
- Sammons, Eddie. Shakespeare: A Hundred Years on Film. Scarecrow Press, 2004.
