= Wastl Witt =

German actor

Wastl Witt (20 July 1882, Hausham – 21 December 1955, Munich) was a German actor.

== Selected filmography ==
- S.A.-Mann Brand (1933)
- There Were Two Bachelors (1936)
- The Vagabonds (1937)
- Der arme Millionär (1939)
- The Sinful Village (1940)
- Der Hochtourist (1942)
- The Little Residence (1942)
- Tonelli (1943)
- Melusine (1944)
- Royal Children (1950)
- The Man Who Wanted to Live Twice (1950)
- Kissing Is No Sin (1950)
- The Blue and White Lion (1952)
- The Poacher (1953)
- Marriage Strike (1953)
- Dear Miss Doctor (1954)
- The Sinful Village (1954)
- Hanussen (1955)
- The Double Husband (1955)
- The Mistress of Solderhof (1955)
- Holiday in Tyrol (1956)
