= Schützenliesel =

1954 film

- Directed by: Rudolf Schündler
- Written by: Fritz Böttger; Edmund Eysler (operetta); Carl Lindau (libretto); Ernst Nebhut; Leo Stein (libretto)
- Produced by: Waldemar Frank; Fritz Klotsch
- Starring: Heidi Brühl; Margarete Haagen; Paul Henckels
- Cinematography: Karl Löb
- Edited by: Margarete Steinborn
- Music by: Edmund Eysler; Herbert Trantow
- Production company: Central-Europa Film
- Distributed by: Prisma Film
- Release date: 20 October 1954
- Running time: 100 minutes
- Country: West Germany
- Language: German

Schützenliesel is a 1954 West German period comedy film directed by Rudolf Schündler and starring Herta Staal, Helmuth Schneider and Joe Stöckel. It is based on an operetta of the same title. It was shot at the Spandau Studios in West Berlin and on location at Mittenwald, Garmisch-Partenkirchen and the Lautersee in Bavaria. The film's sets were designed by the art directors Karl Weber and Helmut Nentwig.

== Synopsis ==
In a small Bavarian town at the beginning of the twentieth century, pretty young Gretl is in love with a border guard despite the disapproval of her father. He resents the young man because he is the son of a woman who once spurned him. Things come to a head at the Schützenfest, after the guard courageously rounds up a gang of smugglers.

== Cast ==
- Herta Staal as Gretl (Schützenliesel)
- Helmuth Schneider as Stefan Brandner
- Joe Stöckel as Josef Mooshammer
- Gunther Philipp as Baron von Simmering
- Susi Nicoletti as Cornelia
- Willy Reichert as Eduard Steinhagen
- Gretl Fröhlich as Christa – Tochter von Steinhagen
- Peter W. Staub as Norbert Feldmaier
- Käthe Haack as Therese Brandner
- Edith Schollwer as Mathilde – Schwester von Steinhagen
- Rudolf Carl as Hoteldirektor Wurzbach
- Paul Hörbiger as Kaspar

== Bibliography ==
- Goble, Alan. The Complete Index to Literary Sources in Film. Walter de Gruyter, 1999.
