= The Man of My Life (1954 film) =

1954 film

- Directed by: Erich Engel
- Written by: Erich Engel; Paul Helwig; Otto-Heinz Jahn
- Produced by: Viktor von Struwe
- Starring: Marianne Hoppe; René Deltgen; Otto Gebühr
- Cinematography: Kurt Hasse
- Edited by: Charlotte Hüske; Ilse Voigt
- Music by: Werner Bochmann
- Production company: Victor von Struve Filmproduktion
- Distributed by: Panorama-Film
- Release date: 25 March 1954
- Running time: 104 minutes
- Country: West Germany
- Language: German

The Man of My Life (German: Der Mann meines Lebens) is a 1954 West German drama film directed by Erich Engel and starring Marianne Hoppe, René Deltgen and Otto Gebühr. It was shot at the Göttingen Studios and on location in Hamburg. The film's sets were designed by the art director Fritz Maurischat.

== Synopsis ==
When a violinist returns to his home town after fifteen years away he strikes up a relationship with an old flame who is now working as a nurse.

== Cast ==
- Marianne Hoppe as Helga Dargatter
- René Deltgen as Nils Ascan
- Otto Gebühr as Professor Kühn
- Ina Halley as Schwester Agnes
- Malte Jaeger as Dr. Reynold
- Wilfried Seyferth as Dr. Nörenberg
- Gisela Trowe as Schwester Thea
- Dorothea Wieck as Schwester Brigitte
- Karl Ludwig Diehl as Professor Bergstetten
- Peter-Timm Schaufuß as Robert Timm
- Emmy Burg as Frau Nörenberg
- Gustl Busch
- Maria Martinsen
- Inge Meysel as Frau Morawski
- Käte Pontow
- Josef Dahmen
- Rudolf Fenner
- Alexander Hunzinger
- Günther Jerschke
- Ilse Kiewiet

== Bibliography ==
- Bock, Hans-Michael & Bergfelder, Tim. The Concise CineGraph. Encyclopedia of German Cinema. Berghahn Books, 2009.
