= The Confession of Ina Kahr =

1954 film directed by G. W. Pabst

- Film poster
- Directed by: G. W. Pabst
- Written by: Hans Emil Dits; Erna Fentsch
- Produced by: Alfred Bittins
- Starring: Curd Jürgens; Elisabeth Müller; Albert Lieven
- Cinematography: Günther Anders
- Edited by: Herbert Taschner
- Music by: Erwin Halletz
- Production company: Omega Film
- Distributed by: Neue Filmverleih
- Release date: 12 November 1954
- Running time: 111 minutes
- Country: West Germany
- Language: German

The Confession of Ina Kahr (German: Das Bekenntnis der Ina Kahr, German pronunciation: [das bəˈkɛntnɪs deːɐ̯ ˈʔiːna ˈkaːɐ̯]) is a 1954 West German crime film directed by G. W. Pabst and starring Curd Jürgens, Elisabeth Müller and Albert Lieven. It was shot at the Bavaria Studios in Munich and on location in Grünwald and Feldafing The film's sets were designed by the art director Hertha Hareiter and Otto Pischinger.

== Cast ==
- Curd Jürgens as Paul Kahr
- Elisabeth Müller as Ina Kahr
- Albert Lieven as Dr. Pleyer
- Vera Molnar as Jenny
- Friedrich Domin as Vater Stoll
- Jester Naefe as Cora Brink
- Hanna Rucker as Helga Barnholm
- Margot Trooger as Margit Kahr
- Ingmar Zeisberg as Marianne von Degenhardt
- Hilde Körber as Wärterin Stuckmann
- Johannes Buzalski
- Ulrich Beiger
- Renate Mannhardt
- Ernst Stahl-Nachbaur
- Hilde Sessak

== Bibliography ==
- Rentschler, Eric. The Films of G.W. Pabst: An Extraterritorial Cinema. Rutgers University Press, 1990.
