= The Forest House in Tyrol =

1955 film

- Directed by: Hermann Kugelstadt
- Written by: Johannes Kai; Hermann Kugelstadt
- Produced by: Richard König
- Starring: Wera Frydtberg; Helmuth Schneider; Dorothea Wieck
- Cinematography: Günther Rittau
- Edited by: Luise Dreyer-Sachsenberg
- Music by: Werner Bochmann
- Production company: König Film
- Distributed by: Kopp-Filmverleih
- Release date: 3 November 1955
- Running time: 90 minutes
- Country: West Germany
- Language: German

The Forest House in Tyrol or The Lodge in Tyrol (German: Das Forsthaus in Tirol) is a 1955 West German drama film directed by Hermann Kugelstadt and starring Wera Frydtberg, Helmuth Schneider and Dorothea Wieck. Location shooting took place around Mittenwald, Innsbruck and Kitzbühel. Interiors were shot at temporary studio in Mittenwald. The film's sets were designed by the art director Max Seefelder. It was part of the boom in heimatfilm pictures in post-war West Germany.

== Synopsis ==
Richard Ferner returns to his Tyrolean home village after decades away, having made a fortune from an African mine. He had fled many years before after stealing from his employer, and had abandoned his fiancée Dorothee, now the widow of a forester. He seeks to make amends to her by helping out her two children, preventing the son from engaging in petty theft in the same manner he once did and helping the daughter in her romance with the son of a hotelier.

== Cast ==
- Wera Frydtberg as Maria Attinger
- Helmuth Schneider as Michael Reimers, Hotelbesitzersohn
- Dorothea Wieck as Dorothee Attinger, Försterwitwe
- Albrecht Schoenhals as Richard Ferner
- Albert Hehn as Walter Brugg, Fahr- und Motorradhändler
- Ernst Waldow as Klinke aus Berlin
- Beppo Brem as Sepp, Bergführer
- Albert Florath as Hotelier Reimers, Michaels Vater
- Christian Doermer as Alfons Attinger, Marias Bruder
- Charles Regnier as Milazzo, Juwelier
- Hubert von Meyerinck as von Langer, Staatsanwalt
- Gert Fröbe as Bäuerle, Kaufmann
- Michl Lang as Karl, Hausdiener
- Jupp Hussels as Herr Küppers, Vater von Margot
- Hans Hermann Schaufuß as Kipling, Sparkassendirektor
- Bobby Todd as Dr. Hausschild, Arzt
- Gusti Kreissl as Frau Küppers, Margots Mutter
- Ingeborg Christiansen as Margot Küppers, Tochter
- Viktor Afritsch as Ringeis, Apotheker

== Bibliography ==
- Bock, Hans-Michael & Bergfelder, Tim. The Concise CineGraph. Encyclopedia of German Cinema. Berghahn Books, 2009.
- Ivanova, Mariana. Cinema of Collaboration: DEFA Coproductions and International Exchange in Cold War Europe. Berghahn Books, 2019.
