= Marriage Impostor =

1953 film directed by Hans H. König

- Directed by: Hans H. König
- Written by: Werner Eplinius; Janne Furch
- Produced by: Heinz Nitsche
- Starring: Hilde Krahl; Viktor Staal; Viktor de Kowa
- Cinematography: Kurt Hasse
- Edited by: Henny Brünsch
- Music by: Theo Nordhaus
- Production company: Helios-Filmproduktion
- Distributed by: Sascha Filmverleih; Columbia Film-Verleih (W. Germany)
- Release date: 29 October 1954
- Running time: 85 minutes
- Country: Austria
- Language: German

Marriage Impostor or Marriage Swindler (German: Hochstaplerin der Liebe) is a 1954 Austrian crime drama film directed by Hans H. König and starring Hilde Krahl, Viktor Staal and Viktor de Kowa. It was shot at the Schönbrunn Studios in Vienna and on location around Perchtoldsdorf . The film's sets were designed by the art directors Hertha Hareiter and Otto Pischinger. It was distributed in the West German market by Columbia Pictures.

== Synopsis ==
Madame is an attractive swindler who targets wealthy men, marries them and then absconds with their belongings. She has successfully pulled her trick on three respected pillars of society and has her next target in her sights - the Englishman Ernest Harrington. Unexpectedly, she finds herself falling in love with him, and dreams of a real relationship, but her past is catching up with her and a detective is on her trail.

== Cast ==
- Hilde Krahl as Madame
- Viktor Staal as Ernest Harrington
- Viktor de Kowa as Professor Angelot
- Alexander Golling as Kriminalrat Dr. Maurer
- Hans Nielsen as Dr. Peter Krüger
- Rolf Wanka as Baron Goutten
- Rudolf Fernau as Adrian van Zanten
- Franz Muxeneder as Bill
- Hubert von Meyerinck as Meister Philippe
- Gitta Lind as Sängerin
- Beppo Brem as Gepäcksträger
- Willy Danek as von Waldheim
- Oskar Wegrostek as Director Wollweber

== Bibliography ==
- Fritsche, Maria. Homemade Men in Postwar Austrian Cinema: Nationhood, Genre and Masculinity. Berghahn Books, 2013.
- Von Dassanowsky, Robert. Austrian Cinema: A History. McFarland, 2005.
