= A Heart Full of Music =

1955 film directed by Robert A. Stemmle

- Directed by: Robert A. Stemmle
- Written by: Robert A. Stemmle; Alf Teichs
- Produced by: Auguste Barth-Reuss
- Starring: Vico Torriani; Ina Halley; Ruth Stephan
- Cinematography: Günther Anders
- Edited by: Henny Brünsch
- Music by: Heino Gaze
- Production company: Unicorn Film
- Distributed by: Neue Filmverleih
- Release date: 1 September 1955
- Running time: 90 minutes
- Country: West Germany
- Language: German

A Heart Full of Music (German: Ein Herz voll Musik) is a 1955 West German musical romantic comedy film directed by Robert A. Stemmle and starring Vico Torriani, Ina Halley and Ruth Stephan. It was shot in Eastmancolor at the Bavaria Studios in Munich and on location in Rome and St. Moritz. The film's sets were designed by the art directors Hertha Hareiter and Otto Pischinger.

== Cast ==
- Vico Torriani as Vico Hasenpfot
- Ina Halley as Blanche Lichtli
- Ruth Stephan as Fleurette
- Wolfgang Wahl as Peer Saldo
- Fita Benkhoff as Ellinor Patton
- Boy Gobert as Granito Bubiblanca
- Annemarie Sauerweinas Liliane Hasenpfot
- Paul Bildt as Lichtli
- Rudolf Vogel as Geschäftsführer Léaux
- Mantovani as himself

== Bibliography ==
- MacKenzie, Colin. Mantovani: A Lifetime in Music. Melrose Press, 2005.
- Silberman, Marc & Wrage, Henning . DEFA at the Crossroads of East German and International Film Culture: A Companion. Walter de Gruyter, 2014.
