= Werner Bochmann =

German composer (1900–1993)

Werner Bochmann (17 May 1900, Meerane, Kingdom of Saxony – 3 June 1993) was a German composer.

== Selected filmography ==
- Playing with Fire (1934)
- The Island (1934)
- One Too Many on Board (1935)
- Punks Arrives from America (1935)
- Fruit in the Neighbour's Garden (1935)
- Thunder, Lightning and Sunshine (1936)
- The Adventurer of Paris (1936)
- The Amazing Quest of Ernest Bliss (1936)
- The Heart Disposes (1936)
- The Grey Lady (1937)
- Alarm in Peking (1937)
- The Citadel of Warsaw (1937)
- Between the Parents (1938)
- The Marriage Swindler (1938)
- I Love You (1938)
- The Girl of Last Night (1938)
- Rubber (1938)
- Who's Kissing Madeleine? (1939)
- Ursula Under Suspicion (1939)
- The Sensational Casilla Trial (1939)
- Detours to Happiness (1939)
- Congo Express (1939)
- My Aunt, Your Aunt (1939)
- A German Robinson Crusoe (1940)
- Happiness is the Main Thing (1941)
- Quax the Crash Pilot (1941)
- His Son (1942)
- Sky Hounds (1942)
- Front Theatre (1942)
- Melody of a Great City (1943)
- Johann (1943)
- Sophienlund (1943)
- My Summer Companion (1943)
- The Green Salon (1944)
- The Black Robe (1944)
- Young Hearts (1944)
- Quax in Africa (1947)
- Everything Will Be Better in the Morning (1948)
- Search for Majora (1949)
- I'll Make You Happy (1949)
- The Secret of the Red Cat (1949)
- Everything for the Company (1950)
- Theodore the Goalkeeper (1950)
- Trouble in Paradise (1950)
- My Friend the Thief (1951)
- The Blue and White Lion (1952)
- Roses Bloom on the Moorland (1952)
- Elephant Fury (1953)
- The Mill in the Black Forest (1953)
- Ball of Nations (1954)
- The Little Town Will Go to Sleep (1954)
- The Fisherman from Heiligensee (1955)
- The Forest House in Tyrol (1955)
- The Spanish Fly (1955)
- Two Bavarians in St. Pauli (1956)
- Between Munich and St. Pauli (1957)
