= Once on the Rhine =

1952 film

- Directed by: Helmut Weiss
- Written by: Richard Billinger; Werner Eplinius
- Starring: Maria Paudler; Jupp Hussels; Paul Henckels
- Cinematography: Erich Claunigk
- Edited by: Friedel Buckow
- Music by: Harald Böhmelt
- Production company: Trianon-Film
- Distributed by: J. Arthur Rank Film
- Release date: 2 October 1952
- Running time: 91 minutes
- Country: West Germany
- Language: German

Once on the Rhine (German: Einmal am Rhein) is a 1952 West German comedy drama film directed by Helmut Weiss and starring Maria Paudler, Jupp Hussels, and Paul Henckels. It was shot at the Wiesbaden Studios in Hesse and on location Rüdesheim and Eltville in the Rhineland. The film's sets were designed by the art director Rudolf Pfenninger. Part of the heimatfilm genre, it takes its name from a popular song. It was distributed by the German branch of the Rank Organisation.

== Synopsis ==
A widower with three daughters buys a hotel on the banks of the River Rhine.

== Cast ==
- Maria Paudler as Elvira Clear
- Jupp Hussels as Mathes
- Paul Henckels as Damian Bacchus
- Albert Florath as Landrat Dr. Wittmann
- Beppo Brem as Gerichtsvollzieher
- Trude Haefelin as Trautchen
- Käthe Itter as Wwe. Lisa Kuchenheim
- Susanne Körber-Harlan as Billa
- Heinz Lausch as Jupp
- Joachim Mock as Apotheker Brändel
- Carl Napp as Schmitz, Zigarrenhändler
- Edith Oß as Kathrin Wittmann
- Harald Paulsen as Herr Zander
- Karin Remsing as Grietchen

== Bibliography ==
- Bock, Hans-Michael; Bergfelder, Tim, eds. (2009). The Concise Cinegraph: Encyclopaedia of German Cinema. New York: Berghahn Books. ISBN 978-1-57181-655-9.
