= Albert Hehn =

German actor (1908–1983)

- Born: 17 December 1908; Lauda, German Empire
- Died: 29 July 1983 (aged 74); Hamburg, West Germany
- Occupation: Actor
- Years active: 1938 - 1973 (film)

Albert Hehn (17 December 1908 – 29 July 1983) was a German actor. Hehn appeared in a large number of films between 1938 and 1970. One of his most notable roles was in the 1941 war film Stukas. He was married to the actress Jeanette Schultze.

== Selected filmography ==
- Comrades at Sea (1938)
- Drei Unteroffiziere (1939)
- The Sensational Casilla Trial (1939)
- Legion Condor (1939)
- Stukas (1941)
- Annelie (1941)
- Tonelli (1943)
- The Buchholz Family (1944)
- Marriage of Affection (1944)
- Martina (1949)
- Friday the Thirteenth (1949)
- Monks, Girls and Hungarian Soldiers (1952)
- Beautiful Night (1952)
- The Mill in the Black Forest (1953)
- The Hunter's Cross (1954)
- The Forest House in Tyrol (1955)
- We're All Necessary (1956)
- The Star of Africa (1957)
- The Battalion in the Shadows (1957)
- Two Bavarians in the Harem (1957)
- The Green Devils of Monte Cassino (1958)
- Rommel Calls Cairo (1959)
- The Scarlet Baroness (1959)
- The Time Has Come (1960, TV series)

== Bibliography ==
- Welch, David. Propaganda and the German Cinema, 1933-1945. I.B.Tauris, 2001.
