= Annie from Tharau =

1954 film

- Directed by: Wolfgang Schleif
- Written by: Otto-Heinz Jahn; Wolfgang Schleif; Hermann Wenniger
- Produced by: Willie Hoffmann-Andersen
- Starring: Ilse Werner; Heinz Engelmann; Helmuth Schneider
- Cinematography: Igor Oberberg
- Edited by: Hermann Ludwig
- Music by: Wolfgang Zeller
- Production company: Apollo-Film
- Distributed by: Deutsche London-Film
- Release date: 5 August 1954
- Running time: 69 minutes
- Country: West Germany
- Language: German

Annie from Tharau (German: Ännchen von Tharau) is a 1954 West German romance film directed by Wolfgang Schleif and starring Ilse Werner, Heinz Engelmann, Helmuth Schneider. It takes its name from a historic song of the same title and was part of the post-war heimatfilm genre in German cinema.

It was shot at the Tempelhof Studios in Berlin and on location across Bavaria. The film's sets were designed by the art director Wilhelm Vorwerg.

== Cast ==
- Ilse Werner as Anna "Ännchen" Wittkuhn
- Heinz Engelmann as Ulrich Lessau
- Helmuth Schneider as Adrian Rotenbach
- Klaus-Ulrich Krause as Utz Wittkuhn
- Albert Florath as Tobias Rotenbach
- Elsa Wagner as Babette Rotenbach
- Bruno Hübner as Dr. Bruns
- Stanislav Ledinek as Lobsam
- Karl Hellmer as Willuweit
- Margarete Haagen as Gru Gutjahr
- Paul Heidemann as Herr Selke
- Blandine Ebinger as Frau Selke
- Loni Heuser as Alma Möske
- Brigitte Rau as Trudel Möske
- Ludwig Schmitz as Ali Schnurre
- Hans Hermann Schaufuß as Wehrle
- Rolf Weih as Grabner

== Bibliography ==
- Bock, Hans-Michael & Bergfelder, Tim. The Concise CineGraph. Encyclopaedia of German Cinema. Berghahn Books, 2009. ISBN 9781571816559
