= Max Seefelder =

German art director

- Born: 16 April 1897; Munich, Bavaria, German Empire
- Died: 27 August 1970 (aged 73); Munich, Bavaria, West Germany
- Occupation: Art director
- Years active: 1933-1960 (film)

Max Seefelder (1897–1970) was a German art director. He designed the sets for around 80 films during his career.

== Selected filmography ==
- The Tunnel (1933)
- The Master Detective (1933)
- Inheritance in Pretoria (1934)
- At Blonde Kathrein's Place (1934)
- The Fugitive from Chicago (1934)
- Between Heaven and Earth (1934)
- The White Horse Inn (1935)
- The King's Prisoner (1935)
- Thou Art My Joy (1936)
- The Unsuspecting Angel (1936)
- Street Music (1936)
- The Voice of the Heart (1937)
- Venus on Trial (1941)
- The Little Residence (1942)
- Johann (1943)
- Don't Talk to Me About Love (1943)
- The False Bride (1945)
- Film Without a Title (1948)
- A Heart Beats for You (1949)
- The Blue Straw Hat (1949)
- Two in One Suit (1950)
- Wild West in Upper Bavaria (1951)
- The Crucifix Carver of Ammergau (1952)
- The Mill in the Black Forest (1953)
- The Bachelor Trap (1953)
- Portrait of an Unknown Woman (1954)
- The Fisherman from Heiligensee (1955)
- The Forest House in Tyrol (1955)
- The Elephant in a China Shop (1958)
- People in the Net (1959)

== Bibliography ==
- Kay Weniger: Das große Personenlexikon des Films. Die Schauspieler, Regisseure, Kameraleute, Produzenten, Komponisten, Drehbuchautoren, Filmarchitekten, Ausstatter, Kostümbildner, Cutter, Tontechniker, Maskenbildner und Special Effects Designer des 20. Jahrhunderts. Band 7: R – T. Robert Ryan – Lily Tomlin. Schwarzkopf & Schwarzkopf, Berlin 2001, ISBN 3-89602-340-3, p. 241.
- Bogusław Drewniak. Der Deutsche Film 1938-1945: ein Gesamtüberblick. Droste, 1987.
