= Guitars of Love =

1954 West German film by Werner Jacobs

- Directed by: Werner Jacobs
- Written by: Ursula Bloy; Per Schwenzen; Alf Teichs; Joachim Wedekind
- Produced by: Willy Zeyn
- Starring: Vico Torriani; Elma Karlowa; Harald Juhnke
- Cinematography: Oskar Schnirch
- Edited by: Johannes Lüdke
- Music by: Willy Mattes
- Production companies: Neue Emelka; Willy Zeyn-Film
- Distributed by: Neue Filmverleih
- Release date: 7 October 1954
- Running time: 95 minutes
- Country: West Germany
- Language: German

Guitars of Love (German: Gitarren der Liebe) is a 1954 West German musical film directed by Werner Jacobs and starring Vico Torriani, Elma Karlowa and Harald Juhnke.

It was shot at the Bavaria Studios in Munich. The film's sets were designed by the art director Hans Berthel. It was shot using Eastmancolor.

== Main cast ==
- Vico Torriani as Roberto Trenti
- Elma Karlowa as Ilona
- Harald Juhnke as Walter
- Topsy Küppers as Gisa
- Gerd Vespermann as Tom
- Ralph Lothar as Fred Jaques
- Annunzio Mantovani as Enrico Mantovani
- Hermann Pfeiffer as Bernardo

== Bibliography ==
- Colin MacKenzie. Mantovani: A Lifetime in Music. Melrose Press, 2005.
