= Werner Eplinius =

German screenwriter

- Born: 16 August 1907; Potsdam, German Empire
- Died: 12 December 1957 (aged 50); Munich, West Germany
- Occupation: Writer
- Years active: 1935-1957 (film)

Werner Eplinius (1907-1957) was a German screenwriter.

== Selected filmography ==
- Gasparone (1937)
- Maria Ilona (1939)
- The Immortal Heart (1939)
- Die goldene Stadt (1942)
- Melusine (1944)
- King for One Night (1950)
- Once on the Rhine (1952)
- The Landlady of Maria Wörth (1952)
- Homesick for Germany (1954)
- Marriage Impostor (1954)
- Music in the Blood (1955)
- The Tour Guide of Lisbon (1956)
- The Beautiful Master (1956)
- My Brother Joshua (1956)
- Just Once a Great Lady (1957)
- The Winemaker of Langenlois (1957)
- The Big Chance (1957)

== Bibliography ==
- Noack, Frank. Veit Harlan: The Life and Work of a Nazi Filmmaker. University Press of Kentucky, 2016.
