= Everything for the Company (1950 film) =

1950 film directed by Ferdinand Dörfler

- Directed by: Ferdinand Dörfler
- Written by: Hans H. König; Hans Lacmüller
- Based on: Everything for the Company by Bernhard Lamey
- Produced by: Richard König
- Starring: Erhard Siedel; Lucie Englisch; Viktor Staal
- Cinematography: Konstantin Irmen-Tschet
- Edited by: Adolf Schlyssleder
- Music by: Werner Bochmann
- Production company: König Film
- Distributed by: Union-Film
- Release date: 28 June 1950
- Running time: 85 minutes
- Country: West Germany
- Language: German

Everything for the Company (German: Alles für die Firma) is a 1950 West German comedy film directed by Ferdinand Dörfler, starring Erhard Siedel, Lucie Englisch and Viktor Staal. It was shot at the Bavaria Studios in Munich and on location in the city. The film's sets were designed by the art director Max Mellin.

== Synopsis ==
A shop owner tries to plot a merger with a rival company.

== Cast ==
- Erhard Siedel as Maximilian Schall
- Lucie Englisch as Evelyn Schall, Ehefrau
- Ilona Lamée as Monika Schall, Tochter
- Wilfried Seyferth as Peter Immermann
- Viktor Staal as Herr Knesing
- Mady Rahl as Lola
- Beppo Brem
- Erika von Thellmann

== Bibliography ==
- Bock, Hans-Michael & Bergfelder, Tim. The Concise CineGraph. Encyclopedia of German Cinema. Berghahn Books, 2009.
