= Beppo Brem =

German actor (1906–1990)

- Born: 11 March 1906; Munich, German Empire
- Died: 5 September 1990 (aged 84); Munich, West Germany
- Occupation: Film actor
- Years active: 1932–1990

Beppo Brem (11 March 1906 in Munich, German Empire – September 5, 1990 in Munich, West Germany) was a German film actor, who was in over 200 film and television productions between 1932 and 1990.

He often played stereotypically Bavarian characters, but managed to find respect as a character actor in later years.

== Selected filmography ==
- The Bartered Bride (1932)
- The Tunnel (1933)
- Must We Get Divorced? (1933)
- Um das Menschenrecht (1934)
- Shock Troop 1917 (1934)
- The Young Baron Neuhaus (1934)
- The Switched Bride (1934)
- Marriage Strike (1935)
- Knockout (1935)
- The King's Prisoner (1935)
- The Saint and Her Fool (1935)
- Donogoo Tonka (1936)
- The Three Around Christine (1936)
- Home Guardsman Bruggler (1936)
- Women's Regiment (1936)
- The Last Four on Santa Cruz (1936)
- Unternehmen Michael (1937)
- Meiseken (1937)
- Anna Favetti (1938)
- Frau Sixta (1938)
- Fools in the Snow (1938)
- The Deruga Case (1938)
- Water for Canitoga (1939)
- Three Fathers for Anna (1939)
- Enemies (1940)
- The Sinful Village (1940)
- Quax the Crash Pilot (1941)
- Above All Else in the World (1941)
- Melody of a Great City (1943)
- Wild Bird (1943)
- Kohlhiesel's Daughters (1943)
- Quax in Africa (1947)
- In the Temple of Venus (1948)
- After the Rain Comes Sunshine (1949)
- Theodore the Goalkeeper (1950)
- Regimental Music (1950)
- Everything for the Company (1950)
- Two in One Suit (1950)
- Sensation in Savoy (1950)
- Royal Children (1950)
- Trouble in Paradise (1950)
- Fanfares of Love (1951)
- Wild West in Upper Bavaria (1951)
- Dance Into Happiness (1951)
- Once on the Rhine (1952)
- When the Heath Dreams at Night (1952)
- Three Days of Fear (1952)
- Monks, Girls and Hungarian Soldiers (1952)
- Two People (1952)
- Carnival in White (1952)
- Marriage Strike (1953)
- Elephant Fury (1953)
- Not Afraid of Big Animals (1953)
- The Mill in the Black Forest (1953)
- The Night Without Morals (1953)
- Marriage Impostor (1954)
- The Sinful Village (1954)
- The Fisherman from Heiligensee (1955)
- Operation Sleeping Bag (1955)
- The Forest House in Tyrol (1955)
- One Woman Is Not Enough? (1955)
- Winter in the Woods (1956)
- Two Bavarians in St. Pauli (1956)
- The Hunter from Roteck (1956)
- The Stolen Trousers (1956)
- I'll See You at Lake Constance (1956)
- Der Etappenhase (1957)
- Two Bavarians in the Harem (1957)
- Between Munich and St. Pauli (1957)
- Two Bavarians in the Jungle (1957)
- Candidates for Marriage (1958)
- My Sweetheart Is from Tyrol (1958)
- My Ninety Nine Brides (1958)
- The Domestic Tyrant (1959)
- Everybody Loves Peter (1959)
- At Blonde Kathrein's Place (1959)
- Agatha, Stop That Murdering! (1960)
- Season in Salzburg (1961)
- Two Bavarians in Bonn (1962)
- Homesick for St. Pauli (1963)
- Tomfoolery in Zell am See (1963)
- Tonio Kröger (1964)
- The Merry Wives of Tyrol (1964)
- Tales of a Young Scamp (1964)
- Aunt Frieda (1965)
- Die seltsamen Methoden des Franz Josef Wanninger (1965–1982, TV series, 112 episodes)
- The Sinful Village (1966)
- When Ludwig Goes on Manoeuvres (1967)
- Hugo, the Woman Chaser (1969)
- Holidays in Tyrol (1971)
- My Father, the Ape and I (1971)
- Don't Get Angry (1972)
- The Hunter of Fall (1974)
- Die Jugendstreiche des Knaben Karl (1977)
