= House of Life =

1952 film

- Directed by: Karl Hartl
- Written by: Karl Hartl; Käthe Lambert (novel); Felix Lützkendorf
- Produced by: Heinz Abel; Karl Hartl
- Starring: Gustav Fröhlich; Cornell Borchers; Edith Mill
- Cinematography: Josef Illig; Franz Koch
- Edited by: Gertrud Hinz-Nischwitz
- Music by: Bernhard Eichhorn
- Production company: Helios-Filmproduktion
- Distributed by: Bavaria Film
- Release date: 12 September 1952
- Running time: 104 minutes
- Country: West Germany
- Language: German

House of Life (German: Haus des Lebens) is a 1952 West German drama film directed by Karl Hartl and starring Gustav Fröhlich, Cornell Borchers and Edith Mill. The film's setting is a maternity hospital, portraying the stories of various staff and patients.

It was made at the Bavaria Studios in Munich. The film's sets were designed by Franz Bi and Botho Hoefer.

== Cast ==
- Gustav Fröhlich as Dr. Peter Haidt
- Cornell Borchers as Dr. Elisabeth Keller
- Edith Mill as Oberschwester Hedwig
- Viktor Staal as Willi Kuschitzky
- Hansi Knoteck as Else Kuschitzky
- Judith Holzmeister as Inge Jolander
- Curd Jürgens as Axel Jolander
- Gertrud Kückelmann as Christine
- Edith Schultze-Westrum as Josepha Spratt
- Petra Unkel as Grit Harlacher
- Elfriede Kuzmany as Frau Frey
- Paula Braend as Frau Wilk
- Claire Reigbert as Schwester Sophie
- Franz Muxeneder as Hense
- Erich Ponto as Geheimrat Merk
- Hans Leibelt as Portier Kögl
- Joachim Brennecke as Kurt Baumann
- Karlheinz Böhm as Pit Harlacher
- Hans Hermann Schaufuß as Vater Harlacher
- Rudolf Schündler as Dr. Blümel
- Viktor Afritsch as Dr. Billich
- Fritz Rasp as Der Verführer

== Bibliography ==
- Hans-Michael Bock and Tim Bergfelder. The Concise Cinegraph: An Encyclopedia of German Cinema. Berghahn Books, 2009.
