= The Little Residence =

1942 film directed by Hans H. Zerlett

- Directed by: Hans H. Zerlett
- Written by: Hans H. Zerlett
- Produced by: Gerhard Heydenreich
- Starring: Winnie Markus; Johannes Riemann; Lil Dagover
- Cinematography: Erich Rossel; Bruno Stephan
- Edited by: Willy Zeunert
- Music by: Leo Leux
- Production company: Bavaria Film
- Distributed by: Bavaria Film
- Release date: 28 May 1942
- Running time: 88 minutes
- Country: Germany
- Language: German

The Little Residence (German: Kleine Residenz) is a 1942 German period comedy film directed by Hans H. Zerlett and starring Winnie Markus, Johannes Riemann, and Lil Dagover. The film's sets were designed by the art directors Max Seefelder and Hans Sohnle. It was shot at the Bavaria Studios in Munich.

== Bibliography ==
- Bock, Hans-Michael; Bergfelder, Tim, eds. (2009). The Concise Cinegraph: Encyclopaedia of German Cinema. New York: Berghahn Books. ISBN 978-1-57181-655-9.
