= The Mosquito (film) =

1954 film

- Film poster
- Directed by: Walter Reisch
- Written by: Walter Reisch
- Produced by: Emile J. Lustig; Helmut Ungerland
- Starring: Hilde Krahl; Margot Hielscher; Gustav Knuth
- Cinematography: Kurt Hasse
- Edited by: Ilse Voigt
- Music by: Peter Kreuder
- Production company: Fama-Film
- Distributed by: Europa-Filmverleih
- Release date: 18 October 1954
- Running time: 110 minutes
- Country: West Germany
- Language: German

The Mosquito (German: Die Mücke) is a 1954 West German drama film directed by Walter Reisch and starring Hilde Krahl, Margot Hielscher and Gustav Knuth. It was entered into the 1955 Cannes Film Festival. It was shot at the Tempelhof Studios in West Berlin and the Wansbek Studios in Haburg. The film's sets were designed by the art director Rolf Zehetbauer.

== Cast ==
- Hilde Krahl as Vilma
- Margot Hielscher as Jeanette
- Gustav Knuth as Karrari
- Bernhard Wicki as Hugo
- Walter Janssen as Lotsch
- Herbert Wilk as Sekretär
- Blandine Ebinger as Frau von Felde
- Isolde Hinz as Mimi
- Ingeborg Christiansen as Ertha
- Carl Voscherau as Fremdenführer
- Axel Monjé
- Charlotte Ander

== Bibliography ==
- Reimer, Robert C. & Reimer, Carol J. The A to Z of German Cinema. Scarecrow Press, 2010.
