= Ball of Nations =

1954 film

- Directed by: Karl Ritter
- Written by: Paul Beyer (operetta); Heinz Hentschke (operetta); Felix Lützkendorf; Karl Ritter
- Produced by: Karl Schulz
- Starring: Zsa Zsa Gabor; Gustav Fröhlich; Claudine Dupuis
- Cinematography: Ted Kornowicz; Heinz Ritter
- Edited by: Herbert B. Fredersdorf
- Music by: Werner Bochmann; Fred Raymond
- Production company: Bühne und Film
- Distributed by: Panorama-Film
- Release date: 25 December 1954
- Running time: 100 minutes
- Country: West Germany
- Language: German

Ball of Nations (German: Ball der Nationen) is a 1954 West German musical comedy film directed by Karl Ritter, starring Zsa Zsa Gabor, Gustav Fröhlich and Claudine Dupuis. It was shot at the Wiesbaden Studios in Hesse and on location around the town. The film's sets were designed by the art directors Alfred Bütow and Ernst Schomer. It was not a success at the box office and was director Ritter's last film, after a plan to remake Pandora's Box fell through and he retired to Argentina.

== Synopsis ==
An American journalist is sent to cover a European peace conference but finds himself distracted by the attractive revue singer Vera van Loon.

== Cast ==
- Zsa Zsa Gabor as Vera van Loon
- Gustav Fröhlich as Percy Buck
- Claudine Dupuis as Marianne
- Ingrid Lutz as Rosita
- Walter Müller as Michel
- Rolf Wanka as Brambachen
- Paul Henckels as Hopkins
- Alexander Golling as Scrjabin
- Erika von Thellmann as Baronin Ziegler
- Chris Howland as Dr. Johnson
- Ursula Herking as Stasi
- Lys Assia as Singer
- Herbert Kiper as Manager Oskar Kaiser
- Alice Treff as Madame Tschang
- Fred Nolt as Hoppe
- Herbert Schimkat as Prof. Heiborg
- Karina Dakar as Solotänzerin
- Ciro di Pardo as Solotänzer

== Bibliography ==
- Bock, Hans-Michael & Bergfelder, Tim. The Concise CineGraph. Encyclopedia of German Cinema. Berghahn Books, 2009.
