= The Exchange (1952 film) =

1952 film directed by Karl Anton

- German film poster
- German: Der Weibertausch
- Directed by: Karl Anton
- Written by: Erna Fentsch
- Produced by: Jacob Geis
- Starring: Viktor Staal; Carola Höhn; Gertrud Kückelmann
- Cinematography: Josef Illig; Franz Koch
- Edited by: Hilwa von Boro
- Music by: Lothar Brühne
- Production company: Minerva Filmgesellschaft
- Distributed by: Deutsche London-Film
- Release date: 27 November 1952
- Running time: 95 minutes
- Country: West Germany
- Language: German

The Exchange (German: Der Weibertausch) is a 1952 West German comedy film directed by Karl Anton and starring Viktor Staal, Carola Höhn, and Gertrud Kückelmann. It was made at the Bavaria Studios in Munich. The film's sets were designed by the art director Hans Sohnle.

== Plot ==
While drunk, a farmer agrees to exchange his wife for a prize breeding bull for several days.

== Cast ==
- Viktor Staal as Simon Gigl
- Carola Höhn as Rosl Lanner
- Gertrud Kückelmann as Urschi Holler
- Karlheinz Böhm as Lorenz Holler
- Rudolf Platte
- Heinrich Gretler as Bürgermeister
- Erika von Thellmann as Ochsenwirtin Genoveva
- Rudolf Vogel as Resch
- Paula Braend as Frau Bürgermeister
- Bum Krüger as Adlatus
- Margarete Haagen as Tante Angermeyer
- Rosemarie Ziegler as Vroni
- Liesl Karlstadt as Fuchsin
- Ernst Waldow as Ausrufer der Schaubude
- Hermann Pfeiffer as broadcast reporter
- Elfie Pertramer as Betty
- Walter Sedlmayr
- Ulla Torp as Salima
- Waldemar Frahm
