= The Little Town Will Go to Sleep =

1954 film directed by Hans H. König

- Directed by: Hans H. König
- Written by: Wilhelm Lichtenberg; Hans H. König; Hans Lacmüller
- Produced by: Richard König
- Starring: Gustav Fröhlich; Jester Naefe; Helen Vita
- Cinematography: Kurt Hasse
- Edited by: Hilde E. Grabow
- Music by: Werner Bochmann
- Production companies: König Film; Capitol Film
- Distributed by: Prisma Film
- Release date: 11 February 1954
- Running time: 92 minutes
- Country: West Germany
- Language: German

The Little Town Will Go to Sleep (German: Die kleine Stadt will schlafen gehen) is a 1954 West German comedy film directed by Hans H. König and starring Gustav Fröhlich, Jester Naefe and Helen Vita. It shares its title with a popular song of the era. It was shot at the Wiesbaden Studios in Hesse and partly on location at Limburg an der Lahn. The film's sets were designed by the art director Hans Sohnle.

== Main cast ==
- Gustav Fröhlich as Peter Bruck - Bildhauer
- Jester Naefe as Ingrid Altmann
- Helen Vita as Fräulein Lissy - eine 'Dame'
- Herbert Hübner as Friedrich Altmann - Regierungsbaurat
- Gert Fröbe as Oskar Blume - Gelegenheitsarbeiter
- Harald Paulsen as Fritz Waldvogel - Rechtsberater
- Hermann Pfeiffer as Manfred Schmidt - Konfektionär
- Alexander Golling as Bürgermeister
- Gerda Maurus as Charlotte Altmann
- Margit Symo as Rita Heinrich - Kosmetikerin
- Ingeborg Morawski as Fräulein von Dobereck
- Gusti Kreissl as Frau des Bürgermeisters
- Bobby Todd as Prof. Borgius - Philosph
- Hans Hermann Schaufuß as Postbeamter

== Bibliography ==
- Hans-Michael Bock and Tim Bergfelder. The Concise Cinegraph: An Encyclopedia of German Cinema. Berghahn Books, 2009.
