= Three Days of Fear =

1952 film

- Directed by: Erich Waschneck
- Written by: Wolf Neumeister
- Produced by: Erich Waschneck
- Starring: Rudolf Platte; Camilla Spira; Cornelia Froboess
- Cinematography: Otto Baecker
- Edited by: Ilse Voigt
- Music by: Robert Küssel
- Production company: Fanal-Filmproduktion
- Distributed by: Panorama-Film
- Release date: 9 May 1952
- Running time: 89 minutes
- Country: West Germany
- Language: German

Three Days of Fear (German: Drei Tage Angst) is a 1952 West German comedy crime film directed by Erich Waschneck and starring Rudolf Platte, Camilla Spira and Cornelia Froboess. It was shot at the Göttingen Studios. The film's sets were designed by Hans Jürgen Kiebach and Gabriel Pellon.

== Synopsis ==
A tailor who strongly resembles a jewel thief on the run, exchanges place with him for three days.

== Cast ==
- Rudolf Platte as Hermann Espenlaub & Gustav Biernatzki
- Camilla Spira as Anna Espenlaub, seine Frau
- Cornelia Froboess as Susanne - ihre Tochter
- Ethel Reschke as Rosita - Chansonette
- Lotte Rausch as Lucie - Taxi-Chauffeuse
- Paul Henckels as Bellmann, der rabiate Herr
- Charlotte Agotz as Madeleine Bellmann
- Beppo Brem as Bepöpo, ein schwerer Junge
- Egon Vogel as Anton - sein Komplize
- Arthur Schröder as Schwarz - Kriminalkommissar
- Erich Fiedler as Bock - Friseur
- Hannes Ponsel as Surborg, Schneidergeselle
- Ludwig Schmitz as Wirt im 'Graf von Geldern'
- Marina Ried as Mieze, Biernatzkis Freundin
- Willi Rose as Kusanke - Werkmeister
- Bruno Fritz as Krause - Hehler
- Harald Paulsen

== Bibliography ==
- Hans-Michael Bock and Tim Bergfelder. The Concise Cinegraph: An Encyclopedia of German Cinema. Berghahn Books, 2009.
