= School for Marriage =

1954 film

- Directed by: Rainer Geis; Anton Schelkopf
- Written by: Peter Berneis; Franz Geiger; André Maurois (novel)
- Produced by: Karlheinz Först; Herbert Junghans; Anton Schelkopf
- Starring: Wolf Albach-Retty; Cornell Borchers; Liselotte Pulver
- Cinematography: Franz Koch
- Edited by: Adolf Schlyssleder
- Music by: Ulrich Sommerlatte
- Production company: Oska-Film
- Distributed by: Union-Film
- Release date: 20 May 1954
- Running time: 102 minutes
- Country: West Germany
- Language: German

School for Marriage (German: Schule für Eheglück) is a 1954 West German comedy film directed by Rainer Geis and Anton Schelkopf and starring Wolf Albach-Retty, Cornell Borchers, and Liselotte Pulver. It was shot at the Bavaria Studios in Munich and on location in the Alps and in Paris. The film's sets were designed by the art director Ludwig Reiber.

== Cast ==
- Wolf Albach-Retty as Tobias
- Cornell Borchers as Regine
- Alexander Golling as Boris Salmon
- Gisela Griffel as Eine Sängerin
- Margarete Haagen
- Paul Hubschmid as Justus Schneemann
- Michael Lang as
- Ingrid Lutz as Billy
- Susanne Navrath as Sabinchen
- Hermann Pfeiffer as Dir.Krämer
- Liselotte Pulver as Marianne

== Bibliography ==
- Bock, Hans-Michael; Bergfelder, Tim, eds. (2009). The Concise Cinegraph: Encyclopaedia of German Cinema. New York: Berghahn Books. ISBN 978-1-57181-655-9.
