= The Imaginary Invalid (1952 film) =

1952 film directed by Hans H. König

- Directed by: Hans H. König
- Written by: Molière (play); Hans H. König; L.A.C. Müller
- Produced by: Richard König
- Starring: Joe Stöckel; Oskar Sima; Inge Egger
- Cinematography: Bruno Stephan
- Edited by: Luise Dreyer-Sachsenberg
- Music by: Heinz Sandauer
- Production company: König Film
- Distributed by: Herzog Film
- Release date: 14 March 1952
- Running time: 96 minutes
- Country: West Germany
- Language: German

The Imaginary Invalid or The Hypochondriac (German: Der eingebildete Kranke) is a 1952 West German comedy film directed by Hans H. König and starring Joe Stöckel, Oskar Sima and Inge Egger. It is an updated adaptation of Molière's 1673 play The Imaginary Invalid. The play had previously been made into a 1934 French film of the same title. It was made at the Bavaria Studios in Munich. The film's sets were designed by the art directors Max Mellin and Rolf Zehetbauer.

== Cast ==
- Joe Stöckel as Daxenmeyer / Der eingebildete Kranke
- Oskar Sima as Mordius / Kurpfuscher
- Inge Egger as Ursel Daxenmeyer
- Jupp Hussels as Dr. Hartwig
- Lucie Englisch as Sophie
- Albert Florath as Bastelmann
- Franz Muxeneder as Kuno
- Gunnar Möller as Peter
- Jochen Hauer as Adolf
- Ulrich Beiger as Rolf
- Harry Halm as Polizist
- Paul Schwed as Hausierer
- Gertrud Wolle as Emma
- Maria Krahn as Frieda
- Sonja Costa as Loni
- Elise Aulinger as Bäuerin

== Bibliography ==
- Bock, Hans-Michael and Bergfelder, Tim. The Concise Cinegraph: An Encyclopedia of German Cinema. Berghahn Books, 2009.
- Goble, Alan. The Complete Index to Literary Sources in Film. Walter de Gruyter, 1999.
