= Two People (1952 film) =

1952 film

- Directed by: Paul May
- Written by: Richard Voss (novel); Paul May
- Starring: Edith Mill; Helmuth Schneider; Gustav Waldau
- Cinematography: Franz Weihmayr; Heinz Hölscher
- Music by: Wolfgang Zeller
- Production company: Minerva Filmgesellschaft
- Distributed by: Deutsche London-Film; Sascha Film (Austria)
- Release date: 13 November 1952
- Running time: 100 minutes
- Country: West Germany
- Language: German

Two People (German: Zwei Menschen) is a 1952 West German historical romantic drama film directed by Paul May and starring Edith Mill, Helmuth Schneider, and Gustav Waldau. It was shot at the Bavaria Studios in Munich and on location around the Dolomites and in Rome. It was based on the 1911 novel of the same title by Richard Voss set in South Tyrol in the late nineteenth century.

== Cast ==
- Edith Mill as Judith Platter
- Helmuth Schneider as Rochus Graf Enna
- Alice Verden as Gräfin Enna
- Gustav Waldau as Graf Enna sen.
- Beppo Brem as Lorenz
- Margarete Haagen as Leitnerin
- Ernst Fritz Fürbringer as Monsignore
- Armin Dahlen as Christian
- Elfie Pertramer as Barbara
- Walter Sedlmayr as Martin
- Georg Vogelsang as Diener Florian
- Michele Bucceri as Italienischer Maler

== See also ==
- Two People (1924 film)
- Two People (1930 film)

== Bibliography ==
- Bock, Hans-Michael; Bergfelder, Tim, eds. (2009). The Concise Cinegraph: Encyclopaedia of German Cinema. New York: Berghahn Books. ISBN 978-1-57181-655-9.
