= The Blue and White Lion =

1952 film

- German film poster
- German: Der weißblaue Löwe
- Directed by: Olf Fischer; Werner Jacobs
- Written by: Olf Fischer; Werner Jacobs
- Produced by: Martin Pichert; Peter Wehrand
- Starring: Wastl Witt; Elise Aulinger; Lore Frisch
- Cinematography: Kurt Hasse
- Edited by: Werner Jacobs
- Music by: Werner Bochmann
- Production company: Primus Film
- Distributed by: Kopp-Filmverleih
- Release date: 18 November 1952
- Running time: 102 minutes
- Country: West Germany
- Language: German

The Blue and White Lion (German: Der weißblaue Löwe) is a 1952 West German comedy film directed by Werner Jacobs and Olf Fischer and starring Wastl Witt, Elise Aulinger and Lore Frisch. It is based on several stories by Ludwig Thoma. It was shot at the Bavaria Studios in Munich. The film's sets were designed by Franz Bi and Bruno Monden.

== Synopsis ==
While very drunk, Bavarian Josef Filser agrees to buy a dilapidated fire station from the municipality. Sobered up the next day, he can't remember the deal. When the mayor insists on their agreement, Filser retaliates by breaking off the engagement of their son and daughter.

== Cast ==
- Wastl Witt as Josef Filser
- Elise Aulinger as Theres Filser
- Lore Frisch as Zenzi Filser
- Paul Kürzinger as Hias, Knecht
- Eliezer Schnall as Doctor Hans Friedrich Knust
- Hans Fitz as Haslinger, Postwirt und Bürgermeister
- Hannes Keppler as Michl Haslinger
- Barbara Gallauner as Zilli, Kellnerin
- Rudolf Schündler as Herr von Kleewitz
- Mady Rahl as Frau von Kleewitz
- Willi Rose as Fritz Stüve, Reisender
- Ernst Fritz Fürbringer as Vorsitzender des Gerichts
- Erich Ponto as Regierungspräsident

== See also ==
- Onkel Filser – Allerneueste Lausbubengeschichten (1966)

== Bibliography ==
- Goble, Alan. The Complete Index to Literary Sources in Film. Walter de Gruyter, 1999.
