= They Were So Young =

1954 drama film directed by Kurt Neumann

- Theatrical release poster
- Directed by: Kurt Neumann
- Screenplay by: Felix Lützkendorf; Kurt Neumann; Dalton Trumbo and Michael Wilson (uncredited)
- Based on: an outline prepared from official documents by Jacques Companeez with the cooperation of Interpol, Paris (International police)
- Produced by: Kurt Neumann
- Starring: Scott Brady; Raymond Burr; Johanna Matz
- Cinematography: Ekkehard Kyrath
- Edited by: Eva Kroll
- Music by: Michael Jary
- Production company: Corona Filmproduktion
- Distributed by: Lippert Pictures (US); Exclusive Film Distribution (UK)
- Release dates: October 20, 1954 (Germany); January 7, 1955 (United States)
- Running time: 80 minutes
- Countries: West Germany; United States
- Languages: German; English

They Were So Young (German: Mannequins für Rio) is a 1954 West-German-American drama film directed by Kurt Neumann and written by Felix Lützkendorf, Kurt Neumann and the blacklisted screenwriters Dalton Trumbo and Michael Wilson (both uncredited). The film stars Scott Brady, Raymond Burr and Johanna Matz and was released on January 7, 1955 by Lippert Pictures. It was shot at the Bendestorf Studios near Hamburg with sequences shot in Lazio. The film's sets were designed by the art director Hans Sohnle. Caterina Valente makes her film debut as a singer.

== Plot ==
A group of attractive European girls answer an advertisement to be fashion models in Rio de Janeiro. Their employer is really an escort agency and the girls are expected to go out with rich men. When one of them, Eve, is approached by Richard Lanning, a drunken American who comes into her room, she breaks a bottle over his head. The agency holds their passports and documents and inform Eve that she is expected to work off her debt at duties their employer decides upon.

Eve and her friend Connie escape, Eve goes to a police station, Connie attempts to go to the Dutch consulate but is kidnapped by her employer's thugs and taken back where she is drugged and beaten. When the police bring Eve back they refuse to believe her story and tell her to straighten out her problems with her employer by herself.

Eve realises the only person she knows in Rio is Lanning, and goes to him for help. Lanning, a US Army Engineer in Germany during the war and now a mining engineer outside Rio believes Eve and brings her to his powerful employer, Jaime Coltos who agrees to help. Unknown to Lanning, Coltos is actually head of the escort agency and plans to imprison Eve and Connie aboard a riverboat to sexually entertain agricultural and mining workers.

== Cast ==
- Scott Brady as Richard Lanning
- Raymond Burr as Jaime Coltos
- Johanna Matz as Eve Ullmann

Uncredited (in order of appearance)

- Ingrid Stenn as Connie Brewers
- Gisela Fackeldey as Mme. Lansowa
- Kurt Meisel as Pasquale
- Katharina Mayberg as Felicia
- Eduard Linkers as M. Albert
- Gordon Howard as Garza
- Elizabeth Tanney as Emily
- Erica Beer as Elise LeFevre
- Hanita Hallan as Lena
- Hannelore Axman as Vincenta
- Willy Trenk-Trebitsch as Bulanos
- Pero Alexander as Manuel
- Josef Dahmen as Dr. Perez
- Gert Fröbe as Lobos
- Caterina Valente as Singer
