= Petra Unkel =

German actress (1925–2001)

- Born: 3 March 1925; Budapest, Kingdom of Hungary
- Died: 2001 (aged 75–76); Kempten, Bavaria, Germany
- Other name: Petra Unkel-Klinder
- Occupations: Film actress; voice actress; radio spokesperson; cabaret performer
- Years active: 1929–1958 (film)

Petra Unkel (3 March 1925 – 2001), also known as Petra Unkel-Klinder, was a Hungarian-born actress of German film, singer, voice actress, radio spokesperson and cabaret artist, who was active in the industry from 1929 until 1958.

== Life and career ==
Unkel was born in Budapest, in what was then the Kingdom of Hungary, as the daughter of opera tenor Petra Unkel (1880–1942),

Unkel started became her career as a child star. She made her debut appearance on screen in 1929 as a four-year-old during the silent film era, in Napoleon at Saint Helena, starring Werner Krauss as Napoleon. Her first starring role came three years after in the 1932, operetta film Melody of Love. Making the successful transition as an adult star, she appeared in films for the next four decades, with her final screen appearance in 1958.

From 1946 she also appeared as a performer and singer in cabaret. As a voice artist she lent herself to becoming a radio spokeswoman, and provided voices for such stars as Nancy Olson, Bridgette Bardot and Micheline Presle. She also provided dubbing of American fellow child star Shirley Temple in the German version of the film Since You Went Away (1944).

Unkel died in Kempten, Bavaria in 2001.

== Selected filmography ==
- Napoleon at Saint Helena (1929)
- Melody of Love (1932)
- The Country Schoolmaster (1933)
- Pappi (1934)
- The Valiant Navigator (1935)
- The Saint and Her Fool (1935)
- The Private Life of Louis XIV (1935)
- An Old Heart Becomes Young Again (1943)
- The Time with You (1948)
- The Court Concert (1948)
- Hello, Fraulein! (1949)
- Artists' Blood (1949)
- Unknown Sender (1950)
- The Lady in Black (1951)
- Sensation in San Remo (1951)
- Professor Nachtfalter (1951)
- I'm Waiting for You (1952)
- House of Life (1952)
- Scandal at the Girls' School (1953)
- The Charming Young Lady (1953)
- The Beginning Was Sin (1954)
- The Dark Star (1955)
- The Fisherman from Heiligensee (1955)
- Love's Carnival (1955)
- Two Bavarians in St. Pauli (1956)
- Salzburg Stories (1957)

== Bibliography ==
- Waldman, Harry. Nazi Films in America, 1933-1942. McFarland, 2008.
