= Ingrid Lutz =

German actress (1924–2021)

- Born: 3 March 1924; Wilmersdorf, Berlin, Germany
- Died: 13 November 2021 (aged 97); Rottach-Egern, Germany
- Occupation: Actress
- Years active: 1943–1959 (film)

Ingrid Marga Irene Lutz (3 March 1924 – 13 November 2021) was a German film actress. Lutz died on 13 November 2021, at the age of 97.

== Selected filmography ==
- I Entrust My Wife to You (1943)
- Young Hearts (1944)
- Tell the Truth (1946)
- Thank You, I'm Fine (1948)
- Friday the Thirteenth (1949)
- Furioso (1950)
- Until We Meet Again (1952)
- That Can Happen to Anyone (1952)
- Beautiful Night (1952)
- Big City Secret (1952)
- Aunt Jutta from Calcutta (1953)
- Hooray, It's a Boy! (1953)
- Knall and Fall as Detectives (1953)
- Captain Wronski (1954)
- Ball of Nations (1954)
- School for Marriage (1954)
- Homesick for Germany (1954)
- Father's Day (1955)
- The Major and the Bulls (1955)
- The Double Husband (1955)
- Doctor Bertram (1957)
- Moonwolf (1959)

== Bibliography ==
- Fritsche, Maria (2013). Homemade Men in Postwar Austrian Cinema: Nationhood, Genre and Masculinity. New York: Berghahn Books. ISBN 978-0-85745-946-6.
