= Anton Schelkopf =

German psychologist

Dr. Anton Schelkopf (aka Dr. Toni Schelkopf, Toni Schelkopf or Schelkopf Toni) (28 April 1914 in Munich – 19 May 1975 in Starnberg) was a German Psychologist doctor who also was among other works a Film Producer in the late 1940s and 1950s.

== Filmography as a producer ==
- Rot ist die Liebe (1957) (as Dr. Toni Schelkopf)
- Lola Montès (1955) (uncredited)
- Hungarian Rhapsody (1954) (as Toni Schelkopf)
- School for Marriage (1954)

== Filmography as an assistant director ==
- Love on Ice (1950)
- Verspieltes Leben (1949)

== Filmography as a unit manager ==
- Vater, unser bestes Stück (1957) (as Schelkopf Toni)

== Filmography as a director ==
- School for Marriage (1954)
- Der Traum des Mr. Borton (1960, TV film)

== Filmography as a writer ==
- Love on Ice (1950)

== Family ==
He married Cornell Borchers (born Cornelia Bruch or Gerlind Borchers), an actress whom he met when she starred in his films School for Marriage (1954) and Rot ist die Liebe (1957), by whom he had at least one daughter, Julia Schelkopf, born in Munich on 15 September 1962, who married at Aufkirchen on 30 May 1987 HSH Friedrich Wilhelm Philipp Georg Heinrich Jakob 7th Fürst von Hanau und zu Horowitz Graf von Schaumburg, born in Munich on 26 June 1959, and by whom she has three children: HSH Tassilo Hubertus Heinrich Antonius Erbprinz von Hanau und zu Horowitz Erbgraf von Schaumburg (born Starnberg, 8 November 1987), HSH Philippa Maria Theresia Prinzessin von Hanau und zu Horowitz Gräfin von Schaumburg (born Starnberg, 15 January 1989) and HSH Thaddäus Carl Heinrich Prinz von Hanau und zu Horowitz Graf von Schaumburg (born Starnberg, 16 June 1995).
