= Gertrud Kückelmann =

German actress (1929–1979)

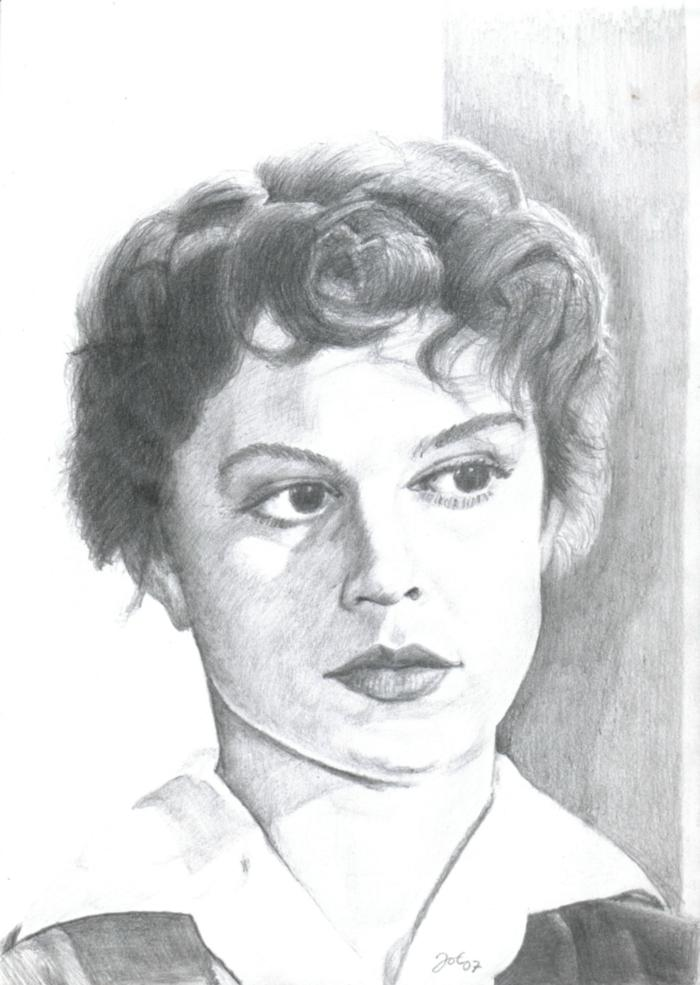
- Portrait of Gertrud Kückelmann.
- Born: 3 January 1929; Munich, Germany
- Died: 17 January 1979 (aged 50); Munich, West Germany
- Occupation: Actress
- Years active: 1949–1979

Gertrud Christine Franziska Kückelmann (3 January 1929 – 17 January 1979) was a German actress. She appeared in more than sixty films from 1949 to 1979.

== Filmography ==
Year	Title	Role	Notes
1949	Hans im Glück	Kathi	
1951	Das seltsame Leben des Herrn Bruggs	Gabriele - seine Tochter	
1951	Mutter sein dagegen sehr	Paula	
1951	One Night's Intoxication	Inge Siebel	Deutscher Filmpreis (newcomer)
1952	House of Life	Christine	
1952	The Exchange	Urschi Holler	
1953	Fräulein Casanova	Eva Schröder	
1953	The Chaplain of San Lorenzo	Gilda	
1953	A Heart Plays False	Gerda Peters	
1953	Music by Night	Maria Bruck	
1953	The Stronger Woman	Sybille Erler	
1953	Das tanzende Herz	Susanne	
1954	A House Full of Love	Mady	
1954	Der Engel mit dem Flammenschwert	Helga Marein	
1954	Die goldene Pest	Franziska Hellmer	
1955	Mozart	Constanze Mozart	
1956	Fruit Without Love	Barbara Kling	
1956	Die ganze Welt singt nur Amore	Gina Fiala	
1957	Spielbank-Affäre	Sybille	
1975	Die Angst ist ein zweiter Schatten	Schwägerin	
