= Hans H. König =

German film director (1912–2003)

- Born: August 19, 1912; Berlin, Prussia, German Empire
- Died: 13 November 2003 (aged 91); Munich, Germany
- Other name: Hans Heinz König
- Occupations: Writer, director
- Years active: 1947–1964

Hans H. König (19 August 1912 – 13 November 2003) was a German screenwriter and film director. After World War II, he entered the German film industry due to the assistance of his brother Richard König, a film producer. After being employed as assistant director on And the Heavens Above Us in 1947 he then worked as a screenwriter before progressing to film direction. Most of his films were produced by his brother and several featured Richard's wife Edith Mill. After his film career ended Hans turned to novel writing.

== Selected filmography ==
- Everything for the Company (1950)
- Drei Kavaliere (1951)
- The Imaginary Invalid (1952)
- Roses Bloom on the Moorland (1952)
- The Little Town Will Go to Sleep (1954)
- Dear Miss Doctor (1954)
- Marriage Impostor (1954)
- The Fisherman from Heiligensee (1955)
- Das Erbe vom Pruggerhof (1956)
- Two Bavarians in St. Pauli (1956)
- Jägerblut (1957)
- The Winemaker of Langenlois (1957)
- Between Munich and St. Pauli (1957)

== Bibliography ==
- Goble, Alan. The Complete Index to Literary Sources in Film. Walter de Gruyter, 1999.
- Noack, Frank. Veit Harlan: The Life and Work of a Nazi Filmmaker. University Press of Kentucky, 2016.
