= Edith Mill =

Austrian actress (1925–2007)

- Born: 16 August 1925; Vienna, Austria
- Died: 10 November 2007 (aged 82); Port Moody, Canada
- Occupation: Actress
- Years active: 1949–1969

Edith Mill (16 August 1925 – 10 November 2007) was an Austrian stage and film actress. Her real name was Edith Rosalia Martha Müll,

== Biography ==
Edith Mill was born in Vienna, Austria, in 1925, the daughter of the innkeeper Georg Müll. Trained as an actress at the Max Reinhardt Seminar there from 1941 to 1943, she had already been on stage in 1934 (together with her sister) at the Deutsches Volkstheater in a fairy tale play. After a stopover in Graz, the actress - who had meanwhile changed her surname to "Mill" - returned to her hometown to take on roles at the Burgtheater until 1953. There she mainly occupied the subject of young sentimentalists, and could be seen in plays such as Iphigenie, Liebelei, Lysistrata and The Flies.

From 1949, she also received offers in the film industry, and had a brief appearance in the drama Gabriele Dambrone staged by Hans Steinhoff in 1943. She was cast as partner to Curd Jürgens five times.

In Munich, Germany, she met Richard König, a film producer 25 years her senior, whom she married in 1953. The following year she appeared for the first time in a feature film by her brother-in-law, Hans Heinz König, whose preferred leading actress she would become in the following years. In the comedy Beloved Fräulein Doktor, Mill played a plainly dressed teacher who, thanks to fictitious love letters written by her students, transforms herself into an attractive young woman. This was followed by Der Fischer vom Heiligensee, Das Erbe vom Pruggerhof (both 1955), Hot Harvest (1956) and finally Jägerblut (1957). The production attributable to Heimatfilm was Hot Harvest, which was based on neorealist works such as Bitter Rice, where she portrayed the farmworker Auschra who falls in love with the son of a farmer.

In March 1957, Mill was in a car accident in which her young son Richard was injured.

After family difficulties, she separated from her husband, who died in 1961. When her brother-in-law withdrew from the film business - he directed his last feature film with Jägerblut in 1957 - Mill's film career stalled and so she increasingly turned to television, starring in crime series such as Sherlock Holmes and Steel Mesh. However, her participation was often limited to supporting roles or guest appearances. In 1959, she had a brief appearance as Lady Doringham in the Edgar Wallace film adaptation of The Red Circle, directed by Jürgen Roland.

In 1968 she emigrated to British Columbia, Canada, where she worked as a yoga teacher and healer. She last lived in Port Moody and died there in 2007. She was buried in Robinson Memorial Park.

== Selected filmography ==
- Cordula (1950)
- Bonus on Death (1950)
- Two People (1952)
- House of Life (1952)
- The Mill in the Black Forest (1953)
- Dear Miss Doctor (1954)
- The Fisherman from Heiligensee (1955)
- Holiday in Tyrol (1956)
- Resurrection (1958)
- The Crimson Circle (1960)
- Peter und Sabine (1968)
