= Helmuth Schneider =

German actor (1920–1972)

- Helmuth Schneider
- Born: 18 December 1920; Munich, Germany
- Died: 17 March 1972 (aged 51); Rio de Janeiro, Brazil
- Occupation: Actor
- Years active: 1944–1972

Helmuth Schneider (18 December 1920 – 17 March 1972) was a German actor.

Schneider was best known for portraying the role of Uncle Dimitri in The White Horses.

He died in a traffic accident in Rio de Janeiro in 1972.

== Selected filmography ==
- 1944: Dreaming - Student
- 1945: No Trampolim da Vida
- 1950: Écharpe de Seda
- 1951: The Goddess of Rio Beni - Edgar (German version)
- 1952: Two People - Rochus Graf Enna
- 1952: Meu Destino É Pecar - Maurício
- 1953: The Mill in the Black Forest - Paul Kemper
- 1953: Under the Stars of Capri - Vincenz Rainalter
- 1954: Annie from Tharau - Adrian Rotenbach
- 1954: Schützenliesel - Stefan Brandner
- 1955: The Fisherman from Heiligensee - Stefan Staudacher
- 1955: The Forest House in Tyrol - Michael Reimers, Hotelbesitzersohn
- 1956: Ein Herz schlägt für Erika - Franz Wagner
- 1956: A Thousand Melodies - Thomas Hoff
- 1956: Die Rosel vom Schwarzwald - Martin
- 1956: Three Birch Trees on the Heath - Hans Freese, Revierförster
- 1957: Frauen sind für die Liebe da - Philipp Hansen
- 1957: The King of Bernina - Markus
- 1957: Jägerblut - Franz Sixt
- 1958: Zwei Matrosen auf der Alm - Toni Leitner
- 1959: Der Löwe von Babylon - Kara Ben Nemsi
- 1960: Cavalcade - Ernst Herrera
- 1960: Stahlnetz: E ... 605 (TV series episode) - Elling
- 1961: The Story of Joseph and His Brethren - Zebulon
- 1961: Drei weiße Birken - Hannes
- 1963: Captain Sindbad - Bendar
- 1964: The Secret Invasion - German Patrol Boat Captain
- 1964: Stahlnetz: Strandkorb 421 (TV series episode) - Bertram Bischoff
- 1966: Le facteur s'en va-t-en guerre - Maury
- 1966: Is Paris Burning? - Adjudant allemand métro
- 1966: La Grande Vadrouille - L'officier allemand dans le train
- 1966: The White Horses (TV series) - Uncle Dimitri
- 1967: Dirty Heroes - SS Gen. Hassler
- 1968: Untamable Angelique - (uncredited)
- 1968: Assignment K - Franz Ulrich (uncredited)
- 1968: Angelique and the Sultan - Colin Paturel
- 1970: Battle of the Commandos - Pvt. Sam Schrier
- 1970: Chuck Moll - Joe Caldwell
- 1970: The Fifth Day of Peace - Col. von Bleicher
- 1970: Kemek - Paul
- 1972: À la guerre comme à la guerre - General von Klapwitz
