= Otto Pischinger =

Austrian set designer

- Born: 14 February 1919; Vienna, Austria
- Died: 5 August 1976 (aged 57); Amstetten, Austria
- Occupation: Art Director
- Years active: 1949–1975 (film)

Otto Pischinger (1919–1976) was an Austrian art director who designed the sets for a large number of films during his career. In 1955 he worked on The Last Ten Days. He was married to Hertha Hareiter, also an art director, until his death.

== Selected filmography ==
- Duel with Death (1949)
- Starfish (1952)
- The Last Bridge (1954)
- Marriage Impostor (1954)
- A Heart Full of Music (1955)
- The Last Ten Days (1955)
- Royal Hunt in Ischl (1955)
- Music, Music and Only Music (1955)
- My Aunt, Your Aunt (1956)
- Emperor's Ball (1956)
- Rendezvous in Vienna (1959)
- Final Accord (1960)
- It Can't Always Be Caviar (1961)
- This Time It Must Be Caviar (1961)
- The Turkish Cucumbers (1962)
- Snow White and the Seven Jugglers (1962)
- And So to Bed (1963)
- Old Shatterhand (1964)
- The Treasure of the Aztecs (1965)
- The Pyramid of the Sun God (1965)
- Call of the Forest (1965)
- Congress of Love (1966)
- Liselotte of the Palatinate (1966)
- The Great Happiness (1967)

== Bibliography ==
- Silberman, Marc. German Cinema: Texts in Context. Wayne State University Press, 1995.
