= The Sweet Life of Count Bobby =

1962 film

- German film poster
- German: Das süsse Leben des Grafen Bobby
- Directed by: Géza von Cziffra
- Written by: Géza von Cziffra
- Produced by: Herbert Gruber; Karl Schwetter
- Starring: Peter Alexander; Ingeborg Schöner; Gunther Philipp
- Cinematography: Willy Winterstein
- Edited by: Arnfried Heyne
- Music by: Peter Laine
- Production company: Sascha Film
- Distributed by: Constantin Film
- Release date: 27 April 1962
- Running time: 92 minutes
- Country: Austria
- Language: German

The Sweet Life of Count Bobby (German: Das süsse Leben des Grafen Bobby) is a 1962 Austrian musical comedy film directed by Géza von Cziffra and starring Peter Alexander, Ingeborg Schöner and Gunther Philipp. It was the second in a trilogy of films featuring Alexander in the character of Count Bobby, following The Adventures of Count Bobby (1961). It was followed by Count Bobby, The Terror of The Wild West in 1966.

It was partly shot at the Sievering Studios in Vienna. The film's sets were designed by the art director Fritz Jüptner-Jonstorff.

== Plot ==
Count Bobby and his friend are running a struggling detective agency. They get a break when they investigate a gang of smugglers using a nightclub as a front. In order to infiltrate the organisation, Bobby is required to go undercover dressed as a woman.

== Cast ==
- Peter Alexander as Count Robert 'Bobby' von Pinelski
- Ingeborg Schöner as Vera Burger
- Gunther Philipp as Baron Mucki von Kalk
- Margitta Scherr as Babsy
- Oskar Sima as Benvenuto Sokrates Socre
- Rolf Olsen as Pietro Krokowitsch
- Gerd Frickhöffer as Marchese Peperoni
- Sieglinde Thomas as Helene
- Fritz Muliar as Director Pullizer
- Bill Ramsey as Johnny H. Clayton
- Heide Alrun as Rita
- Erna Ascher as Loni, a sex bomb
- Karl Ehmann as old waiter
- Johannes Ferigo as doorman at the Grand Hotel
- C.W. Fernbach as conductor
- Peter Machac as Heribert Leitner
- Raoul Retzer as a gentleman on the train
- Krista Stadler as Gerti
- Elisabeth Stiepl as cleaning lady at the 'Bajadere'
- Heinrich Trimbur as Director Langberg
