= Raoul Retzer =

Austrian actor (1919–1974)

- Born: 22 May 1919; Vienna, Austria
- Died: 8 August 1974 (aged 55); Vienna, Austria
- Other name: Raoul Richard Karl Pollitzer
- Occupation: Actor
- Years active: 1952-1975 (film)

Raoul Retzer (1919–1974) was an Austrian actor. Retzer was a prolific film actor appearing in more than a hundred and forty productions between 1952 and 1975 generally in small or supporting roles. He appeared in the 1955 film The Last Ten Days.

== Selected filmography ==
- Ideal Woman Sought (1952) - Gigantino
- The Mine Foreman (1952) - Blasius, Hausdiener
- Heute nacht passiert's (1953)
- Ein tolles Früchtchen (1953)
- The Sweetest Fruits (1954) - Brezo
- Kaisermanöver (1954)
- Verliebte Leute (1954)
- The Blue Danube (1955) - Exzellenz mit Fes
- Marriage Sanitarium (1955) - Herr Kunz
- The Last Ten Days (1955) - Der Riese, ein SS-Mann
- The Doctor's Secret (1955) - Inspektor Bergmann
- Heimatland (1955) - Loisl, ein Holzknecht
- The Congress Dances (1955)
- Mozart (1955) - Gerl, Darsteller des Sarasto
- Die Wirtin zur Goldenen Krone (1955)
- Sonnenschein und Wolkenbruch (1955)
- Bademeister Spargel (1956)
- And Who Is Kissing Me? (1956) - Kesson Filmregisseur
- Rosmarie kommt aus Wildwest (1956)
- Emperor's Ball (1956) - Kriminalkommissär
- Roter Mohn (1956) - Tankwart (uncredited)
- Das Hirtenlied vom Kaisertal (1956) - Ein Chauffeur
- The Winemaker of Langenlois (1956) - Rottenwieser, Barbesitzer
- Unter Achtzehn (1957)
- Vier Mädel aus der Wachau (1957)
- The King of Bernina (1957) - Musiker (uncredited)
- Heimweh... dort wo die Blumen blüh'n (1957) - Hotelportier
- Scandal in Bad Ischl (1957) - Podlasni
- El Hakim (1957) - Basch Tamargy
- Almenrausch and Edelweiss (1957) - Filmproduzent (uncredited)
- Lachendes Wien (1957) - Ein Berliner
- Wenn die Bombe platzt (1958) - Grotinger, Kriminalinspektor
- Der Page vom Palast-Hotel (1958)
- Endangered Girls (1958) - Schiffskapitän
- Wiener Luft (1958)
- Solang' die Sterne glüh'n (1958) - Lokalbesitzer
- Im Prater blüh'n wieder die Bäume (1958)
- Ooh... diese Ferien (1958) - Italienischer kellner (uncredited)
- The Street (1958)
- Love, Girls and Soldiers (1958) - Kolomann, Rekturt
- Frauensee (1958)
- Gräfin Mariza (1958) - Istwan - Kolomans Freund
- So ein Millionär hat's schwer (1958) - Motorradpolizist
- Der Priester und das Mädchen (1958)
- Eva (1959) - Mann mit Bart (uncredited)
- Mikosch of the Secret Service (1959) - Gefreiter
- Auf allen Straßen (1959) - Kartenspieler
- Das Nachtlokal zum Silbermond (1959) - Hakim
- Girls for the Mambo-Bar (1959)
- Die unvollkommene Ehe (1959) - Karl Linnegger - Straßenbahnschaffner
- Ich bin kein Casanova (1959) - Butler (uncredited)
- Traumrevue (1959) - Oberkellner
- Twelve Girls and One Man (1959) - Gentleman-Schorschi
- I'm Marrying the Director (1960) - Kellner im Hotel
- My Niece Doesn't Do That (1960) - Gangster #2
- Crime Tango (1960) - Dr. Roeder
- The Good Soldier Schweik (1960) - Feldwebel (uncredited)
- Glocken läuten überall (1960) - Der Bürgermeister
- The White Horse Inn (1960) - Feuerwehrhauptmann
- The Adventures of Count Bobby (1961) - Barkeeper (uncredited)
- The Secret Ways (1961) - Miklos Terenyi - Special Agent
- ...und du, mein Schatz, bleibst hier (1961)
- Das Mädchen auf der Titelseite (1961) - Alois, Jägerbursche
- Man in the Shadows (1961) - Weber
- Mariandl (1961)
- Ein Stern fällt vom Himmel (1961) - Fernand
- Season in Salzburg (1961) - Inspektor
- Im schwarzen Rössl (1961) - Anton, Hausknecht
- Schlagerrevue 1962 (1961)
- Drei Liebesbriefe aus Tirol (1962) - Assistent beim Sängerwettbewerb
- The Sweet Life of Count Bobby (1962) - Ein Herr im Zug (uncredited)
- The Elusive Corporal (1962) - Disciplinary camp officer commanding humiliating exercises (uncredited)
- Lulu (1962) - Nachtclubbesucher (uncredited)
- Das ist die Liebe der Matrosen (1962) - Oberbootsmaat Zauck
- Waldrausch (1962) - Der Lange
- Ohne Krimi geht die Mimi nie ins Bett (1962) - Polizeikommandant Pepe
- The Bandit and the Princess (1962) - Der Fuhrmann
- The Forester's Daughter (1962) - Hütl
- The Invisible Terror (1963)
- The Model Boy (1963) - Werkmeister Anton
- The Black Cobra (1963) - Martinez Manuzzo
- Maskenball bei Scotland Yard - Die Geschichte einer unglaublichen Erfindung (1963) - Herr Funke
- And So to Bed (1963) - Mann an der Bar rechts vom Architekten (uncredited)
- Hochzeit am Neusiedlersee (1963) - Manager Otto Pfeffer
- Schweik's Awkward Years (1964) - Stabsarzt (uncredited)
- Die ganze Welt ist himmelblau (1964) - Herr Havranek
- Help, My Bride Steals (1964) - Wirt
- I Learned It from Father (1964) - Polizist (uncredited)
- The World Revolves Around You (1964) - Schädler (uncredited)
- Die große Kür (1964) - Barkeeper (uncredited)
- Happy-End am Wörthersee (1964) - Somerset
- Liebesgrüße aus Tirol (1964) - Campingausstatter (uncredited)
- In Bed by Eight (1965) - Schaffner (uncredited)
- The Great Race (1965) - Mayor-Domo (uncredited)
- Call of the Forest (1965) - Zingerl
- Congress of Love (1966) - King of Prussia (uncredited)
- Killer's Carnival (1966) - Doorman (Vienna segment) (uncredited)
- To Skin a Spy (1966) - Driver of the car that kills Wolf (uncredited)
- Happy End am Wolfgangsee (1966) - Chefrezeptionist Schwab
- Spukschloß im Salzkammergut (1966) - Otto Pfeffer
- Spy Today, Die Tomorrow (1967) - Masseur
- The Great Happiness (1967) - Owner of Tivoli Bar
- The Sweet Sins of Sexy Susan (1967) - Sergeant
- Paradies der flotten Sünder (1967) - Chauffeur Franz (episode 'Wohnung zu vermieten') (uncredited)
- Why Did I Ever Say Yes Twice? (1969) - Raimondo (uncredited)
- Come to Vienna, I'll Show You Something! (1970) - Caféhaus-Gast (uncredited)
- When the Mad Aunts Arrive (1970) - Page Beppo
- Keine Angst Liebling, ich pass schon auf (1970)
- Unsere Pauker gehen in die Luft (1970) - Herr Mader
- Who Laughs Last, Laughs Best (1971) - Leopold
- Das haut den stärksten Zwilling um (1971) - Krankenpfleger
- Immer die verflixten Weiber (1971) - Apotheker
- Tante Trude aus Buxtehude (1971) - Oskar
- The Vampire Happening (1971) - Graf Bernhard Ochsenstein
- Holidays in Tyrol (1971) - Dr. Türk
- Eye of the Spider (1971) - Viennese Police Chief at Phone (uncredited)
- Rudi, Behave! (1971) - Pförtner
- Außer Rand und Band am Wolfgangsee (1972) - Franz
- The Merry Quartet from the Filling Station (1972) - Arthur Scholz
- The Salzburg Connection (1972) - Large Man
- Trouble with Trixie (1972)
- The Countess Died of Laughter (1973) - Osmin
- Geh, zieh dein Dirndl aus (1973) - Wirt
- Der Abituriententag (1974)
- Ach jodel mir noch einen (1974) - Johann Berger
- Wenn Mädchen zum Manöver blasen (1975) - Oberstabsarzt

== Bibliography ==
- Silberman, Marc. German Cinema: Texts in Context. Wayne State University Press, 1995.
