= Die Fledermaus (1962 film) =

Austrian musical film

- Directed by: Géza von Cziffra
- Written by: Henri Meilhac (play); Ludovic Halévy (play); Géza von Cziffra; Richard Genée (libretto); Carl Haffner (libretto)
- Produced by: Herbert Gruber
- Starring: Peter Alexander; Marianne Koch; Marika Rökk
- Cinematography: Willy Winterstein
- Edited by: Arnfried Heyne
- Music by: Johann Strauss (operetta); Erich Becht
- Production company: Sascha Film
- Distributed by: Gloria Film (West Germany)
- Release date: 2 February 1962
- Running time: 107 minutes
- Country: Austria
- Language: German

Die Fledermaus is a 1962 Austrian musical film directed by Géza von Cziffra and starring Peter Alexander, Marianne Koch and Marika Rökk. It is an adaptation of the operetta Die Fledermaus by Johann Strauss II, Karl Haffner and Richard Genée.

The film's sets were designed by the art directors Fritz Jüptner-Jonstorff and Alexander Sawczynski.

== Cast ==
- Peter Alexander as Dr. Gabriel Eisenstein
- Marianne Koch as Rosalinde
- Marika Rökk as Adele, the Maid
- Willy Millowitsch as Frank
- Gunther Philipp as Pista von Bundassy
- Boy Gobert as Prinz Orlofsky
- Hans Moser as Frosch the Jailer
- Oskar Sima as Basil Arabayam
- Susi Nicoletti as Baroness Martens
- Rolf Kutschera as Alfred
- Rudolf Carl as Joseph

== Bibliography ==
- Thomas Elsaesser & Michael Wedel. The BFI companion to German cinema. British Film Institute, 1999.
