= Heidi (1965 film) =

- Directed by: Werner Jacobs
- Written by: Michael Haller
- Based on: Heidi; 1880 novel by Johanna Spyri
- Produced by: Herbert Gruber; Karl Schwetter
- Starring: Eva Maria Singhammer; Michaela May; Jan Koester
- Cinematography: Richard Angst
- Edited by: Arnfried Heyne
- Music by: Franz Grothe
- Production company: Sascha-Verleih
- Distributed by: Constantin Film (West Germany); Warner Bros.-Seven Arts (United States)
- Release date: 29 October 1965
- Running time: 110 minutes
- Country: Austria
- Language: German

Heidi is a 1965 Austrian family film directed by Werner Jacobs and starring Eva Maria Singhammer, Michaela May and Jan Koester. It is an adaptation of Johanna Spyri's 1880 novel of the same title.

The film's sets were designed by the art directors Fritz Jüptner-Jonstorff and Hans Zehetner. It was shot in Eastmancolor.

== Plot summary ==
Eight-year-old Heidi (Eva Maria Singhammer) lives with her grandfather, Alp-Oehi (Gustav Knuth), in a cottage in the Swiss Alps. She enjoys spending time in the mountains with her goatherd friend Peter (Jan Koester), who believes that one has to choose between either living in the Alps and herding goats or learning to read.

The village parson (Rudolph Prack) calls in on Alp-Oehi. He asks him to come to the village along with Heidi to attend the installation of the new church bell. A festival is to be held around the installation of the bell. Traditionally, the children help hoist up the new bell, and Heidi should be part of the event. In addition, she could make friends with the children of the village, because soon she would start going to school in the village, anyway. The child should have already been enrolled in school by law. Alp-Oehi protests: Heidi cannot go to school every day in the winter while facing snow storms and the cold. The parson agrees and suggests that Alp-Oehi could return and live in the village, but Alp-Oehi is not thrilled because he is at odds with the villagers. In the past, they accused him of being responsible for a fire which damaged many houses and the church tower, but actually, Alp-Oehi was innocent and even lost his only son, Heidi's father, who perished fighting the fire. Shortly thereafter, Heidi's mother died from grief over their loss. Aunt Dete (Lotte Ledl), the sister of Heidi's mother, initially took care of the child, but she entrusted her to the old man when she got a job in Frankfurt in Germany.

Heidi lives happily with her grandfather. She even convinces him to attend the festival so she can help the other children hoist up the new bell. At the end of the festival, Brigitte (uncredited), Peter's mother, is surprised to see Alp-Oehi next to her house. Heidi's grandfather suggests that "someone" (implying, in a non-explicit manner, himself) could repair the two uninhabited rooms she possesses next to her house, so this "someone" could live there during the winter. Aunt Dete travels from Frankfurt to the Swiss village where she meets Alp-Oehi while he is repairing the rooms he intends to live in with Heidi during the winter. Dete is employed at the Sesemann house as a cook. Alfred Sesemann (Ernst Schröder), a wealthy businessman and a widower, is seeking a companion for his teenage daughter Klara (Michaela May), who uses a wheelchair after an illness. Dete thinks Heidi could be that companion for Klara. During her brief meeting with Alp-Oehi, she asks the old man to let her take Heidi with her to Frankfurt, where the child will receive a good education and keep Klara company. Alp-Oehi knows that this city life will not fit Heidi and rejects Dete's suggestion. Nevertheless, Dete deceives Brigitte, Alp-Oehi, a villager and Heidi. She returns to Frankfurt by train, taking the child with her. Aunt Dete makes Heidi believe she could return to her village whenever she wants as soon as she finds a new pipe for her grandpa. Alerted by Brigitte, Alp-Oehi tries to stop them, but it is too late.

At Alfred Sesemann's mansion, Heidi gets along well with Klara and helps her in every way, but Heidi's spirited manner continually annoys Klara's stuffy governess, Miss Rottenmeier (Margot Trooger), who is shocked to learn that the eight-year-old does not know how to read and she frowns on Heidi's manners and language. Heidi declares she does not want to learn to read because it will prevent her from rambling in the mountains she loves so much. Miss Rottenmeier cannot make her change her mind because of the antagonism the governess establishes between her and Heidi. The other members of the household staff grow very fond of Heidi, especially Sebastian (Rudolf Vogel), the butler. All the while, as Aunt Dete promised, Heidi hopes to be allowed to return to her beloved mountains and live with her grandfather again. One day, Heidi leaves the mansion, walks to the cathedral and climbs up to its tower to see her mountains, but to no avail.

Meanwhile, at Mr. Sesemann's mansion, her absence is discovered. The governess, Miss Rottenmeier, is profoundly upset. The whole household is in an uproar. When Heidi returns, Miss Rottenmeier demands explanations and suddenly understands: Dete had tricked the child so she would follow her to Frankfurt. Heidi also understands that her aunt had played her a bad trick. Mrs. Sesemann (Margarete Haagen), Klara's grandmother, convinces Heidi to learn to read. The governess softens her behavior towards the child. Days are passing by and Mrs. Sesemann writes a letter to Alp-Oehi telling him that Heidi is learning fast and seems to be happy among them. Alp-Oehi thinks that Heidi has forgotten him, forgotten them.

Eventually a miracle occurs: Klara, helped by Heidi, begins to walk again. When Alfred Sesemann returns from a long business trip, he is moved and overjoyed when he sees his child making a few steps towards him. Doctor Classen (Rolf Moebius) tells him that Heidi accomplished this miracle. Out of gratitude, Alfred Sesemann decides the child shall stay indefinitely with them as his second daughter. This decision secretly throws Heidi into despair because of her homesickness. Heidi gets ill. Doctor Classen convinces the businessman to send Heidi back to her grandfather because her illness is caused by her homesickness. Alfred Sesemann agrees, although reluctantly. It is furthermore decided that Klara shall visit Heidi soon during the holidays. Heidi's grandfather is not informed of the child's return.

At the village, Heidi arrives and visits first Brigitte, Peter's mother. Aunt Dete, who accompanies her, prefers not to meet the old man who certainly holds a grudge against her. Meanwhile, the parson visits Alp-Oehi in his cottage, up there on the mountain. He asks him to attend the upcoming Sunday church service and make peace with the villagers and Alp-Oehi accepts.

Heidi returns home with a new pipe for her grandpa. This return resolves the conflict between Alp-Oehi and the villagers. On Sunday, Heidi and her grandfather join the villagers for church service.

== Cast ==
- Eva Maria Singhammer as Heidi
- Michaela May as Klara Sesemann
- Jan Koester as Geißenpeter
- Gustav Knuth as Alp-Oehi, Heidi's Großvater
- Margot Trooger as Fräulein Rottenmeier
- Ernst Schröder as Konsul Alfred Sesemann
- Rudolf Prack as Pfarrer
- Lotte Ledl as Tante Dete
- Margarete Haagen as Großmama Sesemann
- Rolf Moebius as Dr. Rudolf Classen
- Gabriele Buch as Rosi
- Rudolf Vogel as Sebastian
- Hans Thimig as Dompförtner
- Michael Janisch as Johann

== Bibliography ==
- Goble, Alan. The Complete Index to Literary Sources in Film. Walter de Gruyter, 1999.
