= Crime Tango =

1960 film

- Theatrical film poster
- German: Kriminaltango
- Directed by: Géza von Cziffra
- Written by: Géza von Cziffra
- Produced by: Herbert Gruber
- Starring: Peter Alexander; Vivi Bach; Peter Carsten
- Cinematography: Sepp Ketterer
- Edited by: Arnfried Heyne
- Music by: Heinz Gietz
- Production company: Sascha-Film
- Distributed by: Gloria Film
- Release date: 15 August 1960
- Running time: 87 minutes
- Country: Austria
- Language: German

Crime Tango (German: Kriminaltango) is a 1960 Austrian musical comedy film directed by Géza von Cziffra and starring Peter Alexander, Vivi Bach and Peter Carsten. It was a remake of the 1949 West German film Dangerous Guests which had also been directed by von Cziffra.

The film's sets were designed by the art directors Fritz Jüptner-Jonstorff and Alexander Sawczynski. It was shot at the Sievering Studios in Vienna.

== Cast ==
- Peter Alexander as Peter Martens
- Vivi Bach as Inge
- Peter Carsten as Boxer-Franz
- Rudolf Vogel as Servant Lorenz
- Günther Lüders as Uncle Albert
- Margarete Haagen as Aunt Agathe
- Susi Nicoletti as Frau Schleinitz
- Fritz Muliar as Thieving Max
- Rolf Olsen as General Director Schleinitz
- Frauke Sinjen as Elisa
- Sylvia Lydi as Waitress Gerti
- Sieglinde Thomas as Lina
- C.W. Fernbach as Estate Administrator Huber
- Raoul Retzer as Dr. Roeder
- Emanuel Schmied as Jenny
- Boy Gobert as Taschen-August

== Soundtrack ==
- Peter Alexander – "Kriminal-Tango" (Music by Piero Trombetta, German lyrics by Kurt Feltz)
- Peter Alexander – "Straße meiner Lieder" ("Quado vien la sera") (Music by Carlo Alberto Rossi, German lyrics by Kurt Feltz)
- Peter Alexander and Vivi Bach – "Mille – Mille – Baci" (Music by Heinz Gietz, text by Hans Bradtke)
- "Panoptikum" (Music by Heinz Gietz, lyrics by Kurt Feltz)
