= My Niece Doesn't Do That =

1960 film

- Directed by: Franz Josef Gottlieb
- Written by: Janne Furch; Theo Maria Werner; Maria von der Osten-Sacken
- Produced by: Karl Schwetter
- Starring: Cornelia Froboess; Fred Bertelmann; Margit Nünke
- Cinematography: Sepp Ketterer
- Edited by: Herma Sandtner
- Music by: Gerhard Froboess; Charly Niessen
- Production companies: Lux-Film Wien; Sascha-Filmproduktion
- Distributed by: Constantin Film; Sascha-Verleih
- Release date: 3 June 1960
- Running time: 95 minutes
- Country: Austria
- Language: German

My Niece Doesn't Do That (German: Meine Nichte tut das nicht) is a 1960 Austrian comedy film directed by Franz Josef Gottlieb and starring Cornelia Froboess, Fred Bertelmann, and Margit Nünke.

The film's art direction was by Fritz Jüptner-Jonstorff.

== Cast ==
- Cornelia Froboess as Susanne Doren
- Fred Bertelmann as Hannes Doren
- Margit Nünke as Clara Larsen
- Peter Weck as Stefan
- Walter Gross as Rudi
- Rex Gildo as Robert
- Gerti Gordon as Silvia
- Ljuba Welitsch as Opera Singer-Walküre
- Else Rambausek as Friedel
- Herbert Prikopa
- Elisabeth Stiepl
- Anni Schönhuber
- Louise Martini
- Hansi Prinz
- Maria Engelbrecht
- C.W. Fernbach
- Raoul Retzer
- Susanne Engelhart
- Viktor Braun
- Rosl Dorena
- Jane Tilden

== Bibliography ==
- Von Dassanowsky, Robert (2005). Austrian Cinema: A History. Jefferson, NC: McFarland. ISBN 978-1-4766-2147-0.
