= The Merry Widow (1962 film) =

- Directed by: Werner Jacobs
- Written by: Janne Furch; Viktor Léon (libretto); Leo Stein (libretto)
- Based on: The Merry Widow; 1905 operetta by Franz Lehár; Victor Léon (libretto); Leo Stein (libretto)
- Produced by: Herbert Gruber
- Starring: Peter Alexander; Karin Hübner; Gunther Philipp
- Cinematography: Friedl Behn-Grund; Rudolf Sandtner
- Edited by: Arnfried Heyne
- Music by: Franz Lehár (operetta); Johannes Fehring
- Production companies: Sascha Film; Critérion Film
- Distributed by: Constantin Film
- Release date: 20 December 1962
- Running time: 110 minutes
- Countries: Austria; France
- Language: German

The Merry Widow (German: Die lustige Witwe) is a 1962 Austrian-French musical film directed by Werner Jacobs and starring Peter Alexander, Karin Hübner and Gunther Philipp. It is based on the 1905 operetta The Merry Widow by Franz Lehár.

It was shot at the Sievering Studios in Vienna. The film's sets were designed by the art directors Fritz Jüptner-Jonstorff and Alexander Sawczynski.

== Cast ==
- Peter Alexander as Danilo
- Karin Hübner as Hanna
- Gunther Philipp as Hugo
- Maurice Teynac as André Napoleon Renard
- Geneviève Cluny as Valencienne, Revuestar
- Germaine Montero as Anna, Wirtin von "Chez Anna"
- Ernst Waldbrunn as Testamentsvollstrecker
- Harald Maresch as Baron Zeta
- Herbert Kersten as Dr. Martin
- Helmut Lex as Jack Bromfield
- Darío Moreno as Camillo, Valenciennes Mann

== Bibliography ==
- Von Dassanowsky, Robert. Austrian Cinema: A History. McFarland, 2005.
