= One Should Be Twenty Again =

1958 film

- Directed by: Hans Quest
- Written by: Kurt Nachman; Lotte Neumann
- Produced by: Herbert Gruber; Walter Tjaden
- Starring: Karlheinz Böhm; Johanna Matz; Ewald Balser
- Cinematography: Günther Anders
- Edited by: Arnfried Heyne
- Music by: Hans-Otto Borgmann
- Production company: Sascha Film
- Distributed by: UFA
- Release date: 14 August 1958
- Running time: 90 minutes
- Country: Austria
- Language: German

One Should Be Twenty Again (German: Man müßte nochmal zwanzig sein) is a 1958 Austrian comedy film directed by Hans Quest and starring Karlheinz Böhm, Johanna Matz and Ewald Balser. It was shot at the Sievering Studios in Vienna. The film's sets were designed by the art director Fritz Jüptner-Jonstorff. It is a remake of the 1943 German film An Old Heart Becomes Young Again directed by Erich Engel and starring Emil Jannings.

== Synopsis ==
The wealthy owner of a chocolate factory Friedrich Hoffmann is a celebrated bachelor. However, when he discovers that an illicit affair in his youth led to the birth of a child and that he now has a granddaughter Susanne. His nephew Paul unwittingly hires Susanne as his secretary and falls in love with her. Unaware of why Friedrich is doting on the young woman, Paul fears his intentions towards her are romantic.

== Cast ==
- Karlheinz Böhm as Paul Degenhard
- Johanna Matz as Susanne Menzel
- Ewald Balser as Friedrich Hoffmann
- Gerlinde Locker as Friederike
- Peter Weck as Peter Vogt
- Susi Nicoletti as Jenny Dill
- Richard Romanowsky as Medizinalrat Prof. Laurenz
- Rudolf Forster as Dr. Clemens Herborth
- Senta Wengraf as Tilly
- Erik Frey as Richard Hoffmann
- Helmut Qualtinger as Kanzakis
- Fritz Muliar as Bürodiener Berisch
- Romuald Pekny as Johannes Dill
- Alma Seidler as Frau Binder
- Karl Ehmann as Fink
- Ena Valduga as Frau Kalwoda
- Erich Nikowitz as Franz Josef
- Margarete Fries as Irene Hoffmann

== Bibliography ==
- Frank, Stefanie Mathilde. Wiedersehen im Wirtschaftswunder: Remakes von Filmen aus der Zeit des Nationalsozialismus in der Bundesrepublik 1949–1963. V&R Unipress, 2017.
- Klaus, Ulrich J. Deutsche Tonfilme: Jahrgang 1942. Klaus-Archiv, 1988.
- Von Dassanowsky, Robert. Austrian Cinema. McFarland & Co, 2005.
