= The Merry Quartet from the Filling Station =

1972 film

- Directed by: Franz Antel
- Written by: Heinz Bothe-Pelzer; Willi Pribil
- Produced by: Franz Antel
- Starring: Uschi Glas; Hans-Jürgen Bäumler; Willy Millowitsch
- Cinematography: Hanns Matula
- Edited by: Arnfried Heyne
- Music by: Gerhard Heinz; Toni Sulzbeck
- Production companies: Divina-Film; Neue Delta Filmproduktion
- Distributed by: Gloria Film
- Release date: 4 August 1972
- Running time: 89 minutes
- Countries: Austria; West Germany
- Language: German

The Merry Quartet from the Filling Station (German: Die lustigen Vier von der Tankstelle) is a 1972 Austrian-West German musical comedy film directed by Franz Antel and starring Uschi Glas, Hans-Jürgen Bäumler and Willy Millowitsch. The film's sets were designed by the art director Nino Borghi. Location shooting too place at a filling station in the market town of Perchtoldsdorf, just outside Vienna. It was made as a co-production including the West German production company Divina-Film, which had close ties to the film's distributor Gloria Film.

== Synopsis ==
Gaby and her friends buy a filling station, unaware that the construction of major new road has diverted traffic away. In order to attract customers they transform themselves into a singing filling station.

== Cast ==
- Uschi Glas as Gaby
- Hans-Jürgen Bäumler as Tommy
- Alfred Böhm as Andreas Lorenz
- Nicki Doff as Nicki
- Willy Millowitsch as Tankstellenbesitzer Nesslauer
- Gisela Schlüter as Frau Babinski
- Henry Vahl as Ferdl
- Fritz Muliar as Ministerialrat Wurzer
- Helga Papouschek as Tamara
- Raoul Retzer as Arthur Scholz
- Michael Schanze as Michael
- Kurt Sobotka as Ingenieur Kranz
- Eva Vodickova as Eva

== See also ==
- The Three from the Filling Station, a 1930 German film directed by Wilhelm Thiele
- The Three from the Filling Station, a 1955 West German film directed by Hans Wolff

== Bibliography ==
- Cowie, Peter. International Film Guide. Tantivy Press, 1973.
- Elsaesser, Thomas & Wedel, Michael . The BFI companion to German cinema. British Film Institute, 1999.
- Von Dassanowsky, Robert. Austrian Cinema: A History. McFarland, 2005.
