= Grandstand for General Staff (1953 film) =

1953 film by Ernst Marischka

- German film poster
- German: Der Feldherrnhügel
- Directed by: Ernst Marischka
- Written by: Alexander Roda Roda (play); Carl Rößler (play); Ernst Marischka
- Starring: Annemarie Düringer; Adrienne Gessner; Hans Holt
- Cinematography: Sepp Ketterer
- Edited by: Henny Brünsch
- Music by: Anton Profes
- Production company: Vindobona-Filmproduktion
- Distributed by: Sascha Film; Bavaria Film (West Germany)
- Release date: 13 October 1953
- Running time: 100 minutes
- Country: Austria
- Language: German

Grandstand for General Staff (German: Der Feldherrnhügel) is a 1953 Austrian comedy film directed by Ernst Marischka and starring Annemarie Düringer, Adrienne Gessner and Hans Holt.

It was shot at the Sievering Studios in Vienna. The film's sets were designed by the art director Fritz Jüptner-Jonstorff.

== Cast ==
- Annemarie Düringer as Countess Julia Kopsch-Grantignan
- Adrienne Gessner as Countess Kopsch-Grantignan, her mother
- Hans Holt as First lieutenant Geza von Hajos
- Harry Hardt as Captain von Mirkowitsch
- Susi Nicoletti as Mrs. von Mirkowitsch
- Paul Hörbiger as Colonel von Leuckfeld
- Loni Heuser as his wife
- Fred Liewehr as Erzherzog Karl Viktor
- Wolfgang Lukschy as aide-de-camp von Lützelburg
- Rolf Moebius as Duke Karl Eberhard
- Alfred Neugebauer as Excellency von Hechendorf
- Svet Petrovich as Colonel Esterhazy
- Karl Schwetter as First lieutenant Riedl, Adjutant
- Franz Böheim as Ulan Nepalek
- Heinz Conrads as Ulan Lamatsch
- Ernst Waldbrunn as Ulan Kunitschek
- Richard Romanowsky as Swoboda, district governor
- Fritz Imhoff as Sergeant Koruga
- Gretl Schörg as Frau von Lamasy
- Fred Heller as regimental medic

== See also ==
- Grandstand for General Staff (1926)
- Grandstand for General Staff (1932)
