= Hannerl =

1952 film

- Directed by: Ernst Marischka
- Written by: Ernst Marischka
- Produced by: Friedrich Erban
- Starring: Johanna Matz; Adrian Hoven; Paul Hörbiger
- Cinematography: Sepp Ketterer
- Edited by: Josefine Ramerstorfer
- Music by: Josef Bayer; Willy Schmidt-Gentner
- Production company: Wien-Film
- Distributed by: Sascha-Film
- Release date: 29 December 1952
- Running time: 103 minutes
- Country: Austria
- Language: German

Hannerl is a 1952 Austrian comedy film directed by Ernst Marischka and starring Johanna Matz, Adrian Hoven and Paul Hörbiger. It was shot at the Sievering Studios in Vienna. The film's sets were designed by the art director Fritz Jüptner-Jonstorff.

== Synopsis ==
Hannerl Möller, the daughter of a museum director, has ambitions to become a theater dancer despite her father's disapproval. She secretly takes dance lessons, and then bluffs her way ahead of all the other hopefuls by pretending to be the daughter of the theatrical producer. Believing that she may actually be his daughter from a dalliance in Cologne many years before, he hires her for his latest revue show. This is to the irritation of the young theatre director Peter Bergmeister, who gradually develops feelings for her. However, when her lie about her parentage is about to be exposed, she runs away from the show.

== Cast ==
- Johanna Matz as Hannerl Möller
- Adrian Hoven as Peter Bergmeister
- Paul Hörbiger as Hermann Gerstinger
- Richard Romanowsky as Eberhard Möller
- Adrienne Gessner as Elfie Möller
- Loni Heuser as Frau Gerstinger
- Eva Kerbler as Steffi Drexler, Tänzerin
- Kurt Heintela s Harry Gerstinger
- Fritz Imhoff as Dr. Waldemar Fink, Psychiater
- Rudolf Platte as Schmidtmeier
- Robert Rober as Konrad Schmöhle, Tänzer
- Elisabeth Stiepl as Schwester Emma
- Franz Böheim as Theater-Inspizient
- Karl Fochler as Kostüm-Designer

== Bibliography ==
- Fritsche, Maria. Homemade Men in Postwar Austrian Cinema: Nationhood, Genre and Masculinity. Berghahn Books, 2013.
