= Marriage Sanitarium =

1955 film

- German film poster
- German: Ehesanatorium
- Directed by: Franz Antel
- Written by: Martin Kessel (play); Franz Antel; Kurt Nachmann; Gunther Philipp
- Produced by: Herbert Gruber
- Starring: Adrian Hoven; Maria Emo; Margit Saad
- Cinematography: Hans Heinz Theyer
- Edited by: Arnfried Heyne
- Music by: Lotar Olias
- Production companies: Österreichische Film; Schönbrunn-Film
- Distributed by: Sascha Film; Herzog Film
- Release date: 11 February 1955
- Running time: 100 minutes
- Country: Austria
- Language: German

Marriage Sanitarium (German: Ehesanatorium) is a 1955 Austrian comedy film directed and co-written by Franz Antel and starring Adrian Hoven, Maria Emo and Margit Saad.

It was shot at the Sievering and Schönbrunn Studios in Vienna. The film's sets were designed by the art director Fritz Jüptner-Jonstorff.

== Plot ==
A young reporter and his photographer colleague desperately try and get some pictures of a famous but reclusive circulatory specialist that their publisher has demanded. They then take on the challenge of infiltrating a famous sanatorium known to help cure marriage problems.

== Cast ==
- Adrian Hoven as Stefan Seidlitz, Journalist
- Maria Emo as Franziska Kaub
- Margit Saad as Rita Keller
- Hans Moser as Meisel
- Paul Hörbiger as Professor Thomas Eschenburg
- Gunther Philipp as Fritz Keller, Pressefotograf
- Oskar Sima as Director Lehmann
- Christl Mardayn as Elisabeth Kaub - publisher
- Annie Rosar as Laura Hübner
- Susi Nicoletti as Amanda Dietze
- Adrienne Gessner as Mrs. Lehmann
- Rudolf Carl as commissionaire
- Kurt Nachmann as Director Rudolf Burg
- Ernst Waldbrunn as Mr. Dietze
- Peter Gerhard as Mr. Hübner
- Helli Servi as Paula Kunz
- Franz Böheim as Mr. Zagel
- Raoul Retzer as Mr. Kunz
- Fritz Eckhardt as Mr. Rübsam
- Hannerl Melcher as model
