= The Doctor's Secret (1955 film) =

1955 film

- Directed by: August Rieger; Karl Stanzl
- Written by: Viktor Reingruber; Hans Fritz Köllner; August Rieger; Karl Stanzl
- Produced by: Ernest Müller
- Starring: Hilde Krahl; Ewald Balser; Erik Frey
- Cinematography: Walter Partsch
- Edited by: Irene Tomschik; Raimund Warta
- Music by: Carl Loubé
- Production companies: Rex-Film; Schönbrunn-Film
- Distributed by: Union-Film
- Release date: 12 August 1955
- Running time: 89 minutes
- Countries: Austria; West Germany
- Language: German

The Doctor's Secret (German: Geheimnis einer Ärztin) is a 1955 Austrian-West German crime drama film directed by August Rieger and Karl Stanzl and starring Hilde Krahl, Ewald Balser and Erik Frey. It was shot at studios in Vienna. The film's sets were designed by art director Fritz Jüptner-Jonstorff.

== Synopsis ==
Doctor Gerda Maurer is found guilty of negligence and sent to prison. On her release she cannot return to her career in medicine and has to take on other jobs such as a nightclub singer. She is given a second chance by a respected surgeon and works as his assistant, but her new position is threatened by the return of her former lover Georg.

== Cast ==
- Hilde Krahl as Dr. Gerda Maurer
- Ewald Balser as Prof. Stephan Wendlandt
- Erik Frey as Georg Kreinz
- Egon von Jordan as Oberpolizeirat Werner Kröger
- Traute Wassler as Anita
- Hans Putz as Charly
- Elisabeth Stemberger as Ruth
- Jürgen Strasser as Fritz
- Rudolf Carl as Franz
- Evi Servaes as Frau Kreinz
- Thomas Hörbiger as Mitschüler Fritz
- Easy Maja as Negerin – Singer
- Fritz Muliar as Polizeiinspektor
- Raoul Retzer as Inspektor Bergmann
- Martin Costa as Wirt
- Wolfgang Sauer as Blinder Pianist
- Guido Wieland as Strafverteidiger

== Bibliography ==
- Fritsche, Maria. Homemade Men in Postwar Austrian Cinema: Nationhood, Genre and Masculinity. Berghahn Books, 2013.
