= The Adventures of Count Bobby =

1961 film

- Directed by: Géza von Cziffra
- Written by: Géza von Cziffra; Helmuth M. Backhaus
- Produced by: Herbert Gruber
- Starring: Peter Alexander; Vivi Bach; Gunther Philipp
- Cinematography: Sepp Ketterer
- Edited by: Arnfried Heyne
- Music by: Heinz Gietz
- Production company: Sascha Film
- Distributed by: Constantin Film
- Release date: 1 April 1961
- Running time: 94 minutes
- Country: Austria
- Language: German

The Adventures of Count Bobby (German: Die Abenteuer des Grafen Bobby) is a 1961 Austrian comedy film directed by Géza von Cziffra and starring Peter Alexander, Vivi Bach and Gunther Philipp. It was the first in a trilogy of films featuring the character Count Bobby.

The film's sets were designed by the art directors Fritz Jüptner-Jonstorff and Alexander Sawczynski. It was shot at the Sievering Studios in Vienna.

== Cast ==
- Peter Alexander as Count Bobby von Pinelski
- Vivi Bach as Mary Piper
- Gunther Philipp as Baron Mucki von Kalk
- Susi Nicoletti as Mrs. Evelyn Piper
- Bill Ramsey as Bill, the waiter
- Hubert von Meyerinck as Mr. Cower
- Adrienne Gessner as Countess Henriette von Ratzeberg
- Oskar Sima as Mr. Donald Piper
- Fritz Muliar as Josef Powidel, Viennese gangster
- Rolf Olsen as Director Eisenbauer
- Sieglinde Thomas as Telephone operator in a Viennese hotel
- Alma Seidler as Madame Lussac
- C.W. Fernbach as Dr. Kajetan
- Boy Gobert as Slippery, gangster from Chicago
- Raoul Retzer as Barkeeper
- Rose Renée Roth as Visitor to the castle
- Dany Sigel as Flight attendant
- Elisabeth Stiepl as Visitor to the castle

== Bibliography ==
- Robert von Dassanowsky. Austrian Cinema: A History. McFarland, 2005.
