= The Good Soldier Schweik (1960 film) =

1960 film

- Directed by: Axel von Ambesser
- Written by: Hans Jacoby
- Based on: The Good Soldier Schweik by Jaroslav Hasek
- Produced by: Artur Brauner
- Starring: Heinz Rühmann; Ernst Stankovski; Senta Berger
- Cinematography: Richard Angst
- Edited by: Angelica Appel; Hermann Haller
- Music by: Bernhard Eichhorn
- Production company: CCC Film
- Distributed by: Gloria Film
- Release date: 22 September 1960
- Running time: 96 minutes (Germany); 98 minutes (US)
- Country: West Germany
- Language: German

The Good Soldier Schweik (German: Der brave Soldat Schwejk) is a 1960 West German comedy film directed by Axel von Ambesser and starring Heinz Rühmann, Ernst Stankovski, Franz Muxeneder, Erika von Thellmann and Senta Berger. Based on the satirical novel The Good Soldier Švejk by Jaroslav Hašek it depicts the adventures of a simple Czech soldier during World War I. It was shot at the Rosenhügel Studios in Vienna. The film's sets were designed by the art directors Werner Schlichting and Isabella Schlichting while the costume design was by Leo Bei.The film features Heinz Rühmann as the protagonist Schweik, and was nominated for the 1962 Golden Globe Awards.

== Plot summary ==
Schweik (played by Heinz Rühmann) is an unlucky and simple-minded but resourceful little man who makes a modest living by trading dogs in Prague. He gets charged for lèse-majesté and is supposed to be jailed, but when the court finds him to be dim-witted, he is instead committed to a mental asylum. There, the doctors examine his physical and mental status. When one of the physicians accuses Schweik of being a simulator, Schweik assures him that he is an officially approved imbecile.

When World War I breaks out in 1914, Schweik is drafted into the Austro-Hungarian Army as a common soldier. Because he suffers from rheumatism, he is detached as a servant for Lieutenant Lukas (Ernst Stankovski). The latter is busy not getting transferred to the front line, so he can spend his time with gambling and with beautiful ladies. When Lukas loses his entire money and even his servant Schweik to a colonel in a game of cards, Schweik buys himself free with his own money and returns to Lukas.

One day, Schweik acquires a terrier. Lukas is delighted, even though his cat gets mauled by the dog. When Lukas goes for a walk with the terrier and with a girl named Gretl (Senta Berger), they meet his commanding officer who is the dog's proper owner. Accused of theft, Lukas is transferred to České Budějovice. When he and Schweik are on their way to České Budějovice by train, Schweik pulls the emergency brake. Unable to pay the fine for misuse of the brake, Schweik has to leave the train at the next station Tábor and continues his journey on foot. He is then arrested as a deserter and is even thought to be a Russian spy. But because of his naivety and clumsiness he is soon released.

Thereafter, Schweik wants to resume his service with Lieutenant Lukas, but the latter has already got a new servant. Schweik, however, is tasked with delivering a letter to Lukas' lover. Shortly before delivering the letter, Schweik encounters his old friend Woditschka (Franz Muxeneder) and they get drunk together. In the evening, Schweik wants to finally get rid of the letter, but now the lady's husband has returned. In order to protect Lukas, Schweik pretends that he wrote the love letter himself.

Eventually, Lukas and Schweik are transferred to the Russian front. While being under hostile fire on the battlefield, Schweik finds a four-leaf clover and gives it to Lukas as a talisman. Shortly after though, Lukas is mortally wounded, and gets carried off the battlefield by Schweik. Schweik hides in a corn field and comes across a Russian soldier. They become friends and swap their uniforms. Schweik is then arrested by an Austrian patrol who consider him to be a Russian. He is charged with desertion and defection and is convicted to death by firing squad. However, just when he is to be executed, the war ends and Schweik is released. He returns home and meets Woditschka in his favourite pub. So, despite the grand political scheme of the war, in the end, nothing changed for Schweik.

== Cast ==
- Heinz Rühmann as Schwejk
- Ernst Stankovski as Oberleutnant Lukas
- Franz Muxeneder as Woditschka
- Ursula von Borsody as Kathi
- Erika von Thellmann as Baronin
- Senta Berger as Gretl
- Fritz Imhoff as Palivec
- Jane Tilden as Housemaid
- Rudolf Rhomberg as Stabsarzt
- Fritz Eckhardt as Wendler
- Hugo Gottschlich as Wachtmeister Flanderka
- Michael Janisch
- Fritz Muliar as Russian Soldier
- Hans Unterkircher as Official
- Erik Frey as Colonel
- Erland Erlandsen
- Egon von Jordan
- Hans Thimig
- Guido Wieland
- Edith Elmay
- Alma Seidler

== Awards and nominations ==
The film was nominated for the 1962 Golden Globe for Best Foreign-Language Foreign Film (Samuel Goldwyn International Award).

== Bibliography ==
- Goble, Alan. The Complete Index to Literary Sources in Film. Walter de Gruyter, 1999.
