= Help, My Bride Steals =

1964 film

- Directed by: Werner Jacobs
- Screenplay by: Janne Furch
- Produced by: Herbert Gruber
- Starring: Peter Alexander; Cornelia Froboess
- Cinematography: Sepp Ketterer
- Edited by: Arnfried Heyne
- Music by: Johannes Fehring
- Production companies: Divina-Film; Sascha Film
- Distributed by: Gloria Film
- Release date: August 4, 1964 (West Germany)
- Running time: 83 min
- Countries: Austria; West Germany
- Language: German

Help, My Bride Steals (German: Hilfe, meine Braut klaut) is a 1964 Austrian-West German comedy film directed by Werner Jacobs and starring Peter Alexander, Cornelia Froboess and Gunther Philipp. A man marries a woman soon after meeting her, unaware that she is a kleptomaniac.

== Cast ==
- Peter Alexander as Valentin Haase
- Cornelia Froboess as Elisabeth Schöner
- Gunther Philipp as Gustav Notnagel
- Elfriede Irrall as Tessy
- Fred Liewehr as Generaldirektor Schöner, Elisabeths Vater
- Guggi Löwinger as Champagnermizzi
- Kurt Heintel as Direktor Bensberg
- Rudolf Carl as Ober Franz
- Guido Wieland as Ein Herr
- Peter Gerhard as Juwelier
- Raoul Retzer as Wirt
- Elisabeth Stiepl as Ältere Dame
- Rudolf Vogel as Psychotherapeut
