= Elisabeth Stiepl =

Austrian actress

- Born: 27 February 1921; Vienna, Austria
- Died: 4 May 2007 (aged 86); Neulengbach, Austria
- Occupation: Actress
- Years active: 1951–2001

Elisabeth Stiepl (27 February 1921 – 4 May 2007) was an Austrian film and television actress. As a character actress, she appeared in more than ninety film and TV productions during her career in small or supporting parts. Stiepl died in Neulengbach on 4 May 2007, at the age of 86.

== Selected filmography ==
- Hannerl (1952)
- Das Licht der Liebe (1954)
- The Song of Kaprun (1955)
- Scandal in Bad Ischl (1957)
- The Priest and the Girl (1958)
- Herr Puntila and His Servant Matti (1960)
- My Niece Doesn't Do That (1960)
- Mariandl (1961)
- The Adventures of Count Bobby (1961)
- The Sweet Life of Count Bobby (1962)
- An Alibi for Death (1963)
- Is Geraldine an Angel? (1963)
- Our Crazy Nieces (1963)
- Help, My Bride Steals (1964)
- In Bed by Eight (1965)
- Call of the Forest (1965)
- The Murderer with the Silk Scarf (1966)
- Frau Wirtin treibt es jetzt noch toller (1970)
- The Reverend Turns a Blind Eye (1971)
- Und Jimmy ging zum Regenbogen (1971)
- Love Hotel in Tyrol (1978)

== Bibliography ==
- Peter Cowie. Variety International Film Guide. Tantivy Press, 1984.
