= Janne Furch =

German screenwriter

- Born: 6 May 1915; Kiel, German Empire
- Died: 28 March 1992 (aged 76); Feldafing, Bavaria, Germany
- Other name: Janne Furch-Allers
- Occupations: Writer, Actress
- Years active: 1941-1974 (film)

Janne Furch (1915–1992, nee Ertel) was a German screenwriter. She also acted in three films early in her career. She was married to the conductor Franz Allers.

== Selected filmography ==
- To Be God One Time (1942)
- Marriage Impostor (1954)
- Dear Miss Doctor (1954)
- Homesick for Germany (1954)
- Music in the Blood (1955)
- The Tour Guide of Lisbon (1956)
- My Brother Joshua (1956)
- The Beautiful Master (1956)
- Just Once a Great Lady (1957)
- The Big Chance (1957)
- The Winemaker of Langenlois (1957)
- Two Hearts in May (1958)
- Thirteen Old Donkeys (1958)
- The Csardas King (1958)
- That's No Way to Land a Man (1959)
- Kein Mann zum Heiraten (1959)
- The White Horse Inn (1960)
- My Niece Doesn't Do That (1960)
- Guitars Sound Softly Through the Night (1960)
- Always Trouble with the Bed (1961)
- Robert and Bertram (1961)
- Mariandl (1961)
- Doctor Sibelius (1962)
- The Merry Widow (1962)
- The Forester's Daughter (1962)
- The Curse of the Yellow Snake (1963)
- The Model Boy (1963)
- Help, My Bride Steals (1964)
- The World Revolves Around You (1964)
- In Bed by Eight (1965)
- Always Trouble with the Teachers (1968)

== Bibliography ==
- Bergfelder, Tim. International Adventures: German Popular Cinema and European Co-Productions in the 1960s. Berghahn Books, 2005.
