= The Priest and the Girl (1958 film) =

1958 film

- German film poster
- German: Der Priester und das Mädchen
- Directed by: Gustav Ucicky
- Written by: Hellmut Andics; Werner P. Zibaso
- Produced by: Herbert Gruber; Karl Schwetter
- Starring: Rudolf Prack; Willy Birgel; Marianne Hold
- Cinematography: Günther Anders; Hannes Staudinger
- Edited by: Herma Sandtner
- Music by: Franz Grothe
- Production company: Sascha Film
- Distributed by: Gloria Film
- Release date: 19 December 1958
- Running time: 89 minutes
- Country: Austria
- Language: German

The Priest and the Girl (German: Der Priester und das Mädchen) is a 1958 Austrian drama film directed by Gustav Ucicky and starring Rudolf Prack, Willy Birgel and Marianne Hold.

The film's sets were designed by the art directors Isabella Schlichting and Werner Schlichting.

== Cast ==
- Rudolf Prack as Walter Hartwig
- Willy Birgel as von Gronau
- Marianne Hold as Eva
- Rudolf Lenz as Stefan von Steinegg
- Winnie Markus as Herta
- Hans Thimig as Legation councilor Düringer
- Rolf Wanka as Fiori
- Ewald Balser as Bischof
- Friedl Czepa as Marie
- Hugo Gottschlich as Kilian
- Rosl Dorena as Frl. Weidlich
- Marianne Gerzner as Mrs. Übel
- Mario Kranz as Mr. Kurz
- Elisabeth Stiepl as Mrs. Kurz
- Karl Ehmann as Dr. Lederbauer
