= Helmut Qualtinger =

Austrian actor and cabaret performer (1928-1986)

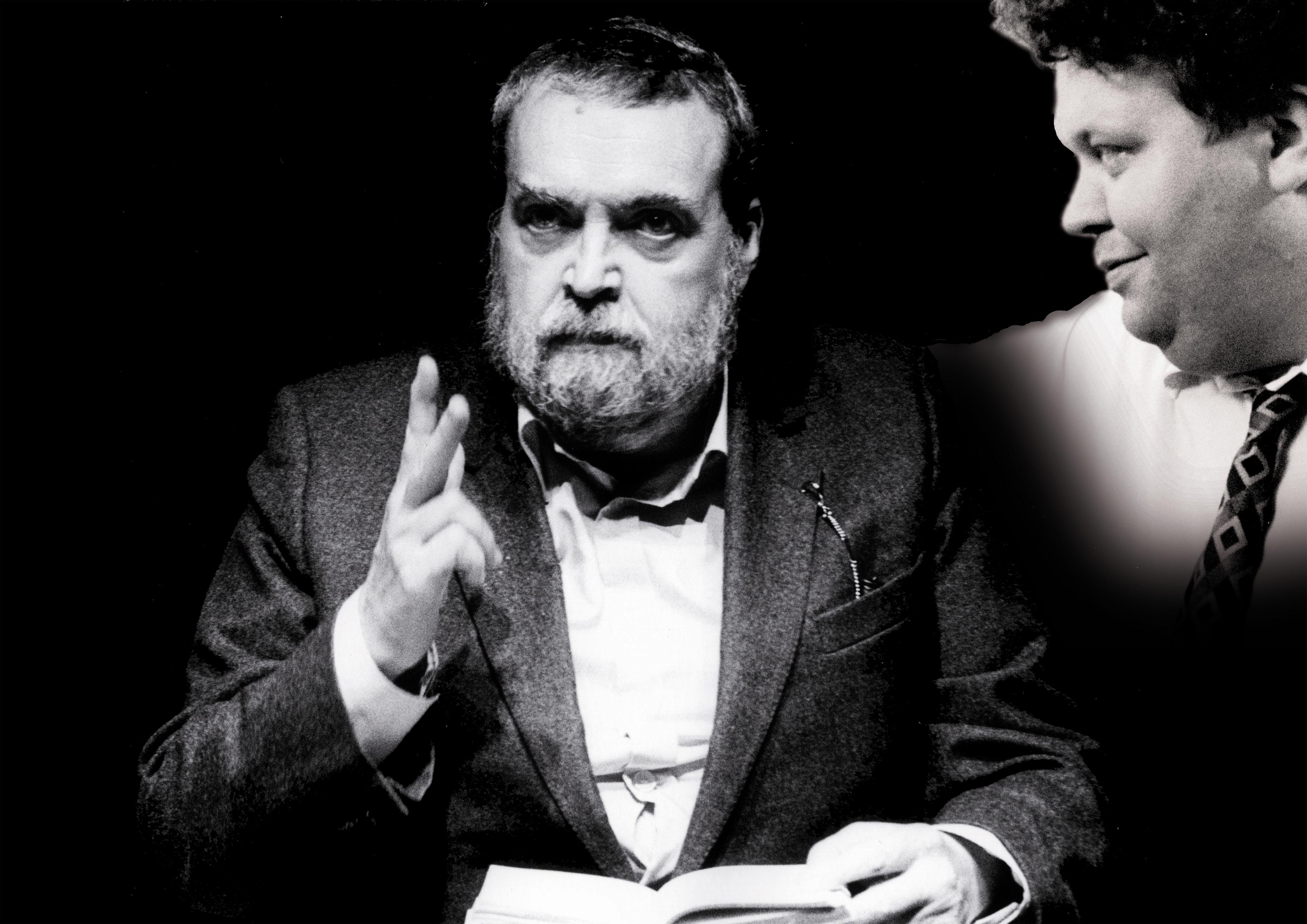
- Qualtinger and Georg Biron in 1985
- Born: Helmut Gustav Friedrich Qualtinger; 8 October 1928; Vienna, Austria
- Died: 8 September 1986 (aged 57); Vienna, Austria
- Other name: Helmuth Qualtinger
- Education: Max Reinhardt Seminar
- Occupations: Actor; writer; cabaret performer; reciter
- Years active: 1947–1986

Helmut Gustav Friedrich Qualtinger (German: [ˈhɛlmuːt ˈkvaltɪŋɐ]; 8 October 1928 – 29 September 1986; also spelled Helmuth Qualtinger) was an Austrian actor, cabaret performer, writer and reciter.

== Biography ==
Qualtinger was born in Vienna, First Austrian Republic, to a secondary education teacher and his wife, stemming from the bourgeois class of the Bildungsbürgertum, his father being a follower of the German Nazi movement. While at school Qualtinger's interest in literature and acting became obvious and he founded a youth theater as a pupil. Afterwards he initially studied medicine and literature, but quit university to become a newspaper reporter and film critic for local press, while beginning to write his own texts for cabaret performances and theater plays. Qualtinger continued as an actor at student theaters and revues and attended the Max Reinhardt Seminar as a guest student.

=== Cabaret ===
Beginning in 1947, he appeared in cabaret performances. In 1949, Qualtinger's first theatrical play, Jugend vor den Schranken (Youth in front of Barriers), was staged in Graz and caused furor for portraying teenagers and their rebellious behaviour. Up to 1961, Qualtinger collaborated on various cabaret programmes with the Namenlosen Ensemble (Nameless Ensemble, founded 1952) made up of Gerhard Bronner, Carl Merz, Louise Martini, Peter Wehle, Georg Kreisler, and Michael Kehlmann. He also continued to write commentaries, mostly satirical, for Austrian news papers e.g. from 1955 to 1961 for the Kurier together with his acting colleague Carl Merz.

The chansons presented in these cabaret revues, for example „Papa wird's scho richten“ (Daddy's gonna fix it), and his „Travnicek dialogs“ with Bronner became (in)famous to the history of Austrian cabaret. Mr. Travnicek is a typical little man character, mostly in a bad mood. He is asked questions only to reveal his odd, sometimes misanthropic views on things going on.

=== Acting ===
Qualtinger also played several serious theater, TV and film parts, the film Kurzer Prozess and the Alpensaga TV series were among those well received.

The short one-man play Der Herr Karl, which was written by Qualtinger and Merz, broadcast on Austrian public television (ORF) in 1961 with Qualtinger playing the lead character. He later went on to perform the role on stage, making him well known across German-speaking countries. "Herr Karl", a grocery store clerk, is telling the story of his life and deeds to an imaginary colleague (the camera/spectator) – from the days of the First Austrian Republic after the end of the Habsburg empire (1918), leading up to the transformation into the Austrofascist regime (1934) and the Anschluss (annexation) by Nazi Germany (1938), followed by World War II and finally the occupation by Allied forces until the mid-1950s, seen from the perspective of one who is a prototypical opportunist. Qualtinger's portrayal of the petit-bourgeois collaborator came at a time when "normality" had just been restored and involvement of Austrians in the fascist and later Nazi movements was being downplayed and wished to be "forgotten", causing a stir and many enemies for the authors, Qualtinger even received anonymous threats of murder for his part as "Mr. Everyman" as a hanger-on.

Already seriously ill, he made his final acting appearance in 1986 as the heretic monk "Remigio da Varagine" in The Name of the Rose, along with Sean Connery and F. Murray Abraham.

=== Recitations ===
Beginning with the 1970s, Qualtinger frequently performed recital tours of his own and other texts, including excerpts from Adolf Hitler's Mein Kampf and Karl Kraus' Die letzten Tage der Menschheit (The Last Days of Mankind). His recitals were very popular and resulted in several records being published.

=== Pranks ===
Qualtinger was also known for his, sometimes crude, practical jokes. In May 1945 just as the Second World War had ended he staged a confiscation of a mansion as an "appointed Commissioner for Culture", using a self-signed letter of authorization and a "Soviet Star" symbol on his clothing for legitimation. Qualtinger intended to found a theater and was about to recruit actors when his coup was uncovered and he was jailed for three months by the Soviet occupation force.

In 1951, he managed to launch a false report in several newspapers, a so-called canard (germ. "Zeitungsente"), announcing the visit of a (fictional) famous Inuit poet named Kobuk (author of "The Burning Igloo") to Vienna. Reporters who assembled at the railway station however were to witness the "Inuit poet", in fur coat and cap, stepping from the train. Asked about his "first impressions of Vienna", Qualtinger commented in broad Viennese dialect, "Haaß is's do (It's hot here)!"

== Death ==
Helmut Qualtinger died in Vienna on 29 September 1986, of a liver condition.

== Filmography ==
Year	Title	Role	Notes
1952	1. April 2000	Vier im Jeep: Der Russe	Uncredited
1953	Fräulein Casanova		
1953	To Be Without Worries	Kraps	
1953	Drei, von denen man spricht		
1953	If I Only Have Your Love	Direktor Pokorny	
1954	König der Manege	Mirko	
1954	Hochstaplerin der Liebe		
1955	Du bist die Richtige	Orientalischer Fürst	
1955	Hanussen	Ernst Röhm	
1955	Sonnenschein und Wolkenbruch		
1957	Scherben bringen Glück	Wollner, Direktor vom Revuetheater	
1958	One Should Be Twenty Again	Kanzakis	
1959	Mikosch of the Secret Service	Oberst Fedor Fedorowitsch Ganiew	
1959	Die schöne Lügnerin	Geheimpolizist Zawadil / Detective Zawadil	
1960	Mit Himbeergeist geht alles besser	Seppl Reber	
1961	Tales from the Vienna Woods	Oskar	TV film
1961	Man in the Shadows	Dr. Radosch, Oberpolizeirat	
1961	Die Kurve	Dr. Erich Kriegbaum	TV play
1965	Lumpaci the Vagabond	Knieriem, ein Schustergeselle	
1967	Kurzer Prozess	Inspektor Pokorny	
1967	Der Paukenspieler	Ferry	
1968	The Castle	Burgel	
1971	Das falsche Gewicht	Anselm Eibenschuetz	TV film
1974	Der Kulterer	Kulterer	TV film
1974	Krankensaal 6	Ragin	
1975	Ice Age	Fitler / Old Officer	
1975	End of the Game	von Schwendi	
1976	MitGift	Kommissar Huck	
1976–1977	Die Alpensaga	Allinger	3 episodes
1977	Abelard		
1978	Mulligans Rückkehr	Mulligan	TV film
1979	Grandison	Dr. Ludwig Pfister	
1979	Tales from the Vienna Woods	Zauberkönig	
1983	Cats' Play	Viktor	TV film
1986	Das Diarium des Dr. Döblinger		
1986	The Name of the Rose	Remigio de Varagine	(final film role)
