= On the Green Meadow =

1953 film

- Directed by: Fritz Böttger
- Written by: Hanns H. Fischer; Ulrich Bettac
- Produced by: Alfred Stöger
- Starring: Hannelore Bollmann; Ida Krottendorf; Lucie Englisch
- Cinematography: Sepp Ketterer
- Edited by: Hermine Diethelm
- Music by: Frank Fox
- Production companies: Wien-Film; Mundus Film
- Distributed by: Sascha Filmverleih
- Release date: 24 September 1953
- Running time: 96 minutes
- Country: Austria
- Language: German

On the Green Meadow (German: Auf der grünen Wiese) is a 1953 Austrian musical comedy film directed by Fritz Böttger and starring Hannelore Bollmann, Ida Krottendorf and Lucie Englisch. It is based on the 1936 operetta of the same title by Jara Beneš and Victor Tolarsky, and used the typical rural setting of heimatfilm. The film's sets were designed by the art director Fritz Jüptner-Jonstorff. Location shooting took place around the Vienna Woods. It premiered in Stuttgart in West Germany.

== Cast ==
- Hannelore Bollmann as Vera Sternberg
- Ida Krottendorf as Hanni Borstl
- Lucie Englisch as Creszenz Borstl
- Walter Müller as Otto Liebling
- Hans Holt Heinz Huber, Verwalter
- Rudolf Carl as Balthasar Borstl, Waldpfleger
- Ulrich Bettac as Franz Sternberg
- Erik Frey as Kurt v. Arnoldi
- Ernst Waldbrunn as Welisch

== Bibliography ==
- Fritsche, Maria. Homemade Men in Postwar Austrian Cinema: Nationhood, Genre and Masculinity. Berghahn Books, 2013.
