= Boy Gobert =

German actor

- Born: 5 June 1925; Hamburg; Germany
- Died: 30 May 1986 (aged 60); Vienna, Austria
- Occupation: Film actor
- Years active: 1954–1986

Boy Gobert (5 June 1925 – 30 May 1986) was a German film and television actor.

== Partial filmography ==
- Island of the Dead (1955) – Schiffs-Steward
- A Heart Full of Music (1955) – Granito Bubiblanca
- My Children and I (1955) – Charlie Scheller – Manager
- Pulverschnee nach Übersee (1956) – Bob Webster
- The Model Husband (1956) – Freddy Evans
- Uns gefällt die Welt (1956) – Regisseur im Revuetheater
- Imperial and Royal Field Marshal (1956) – Manfred von Pisewitz
- Victor and Victoria (1957) – Lacoste
- Tolle Nacht (1957) – Hotelbesitzer Ernst Castell
- Dort in der Wachau (1957) – Emil Bayerl
- Love From Paris (1957) – Monpti 2
- The Daring Swimmer (1957) – Fritz Hohebirke
- Junger Mann, der alles kann (1957) – Rombach, Kunsthändler
- Europas neue Musikparade 1958 (1957) – Karl
- A Piece of Heaven (1957) – Sir Jackie Taft-Holery
- Black Forest Cherry Schnapps (1958) – Freddy Weller
- Hoch klingt der Radetzkymarsch (1958) – Carl von Heymendorf – Leutnant im Regiment 'Prinz Eugen'
- Peter Voss, Thief of Millions (1958) – Ramon Cadalso
- Majestät auf Abwegen (1958) – Graf Elopatak
- Here I Am, Here I Stay (1959) – Gustave
- Frau im besten Mannesalter (1959) – Peer
- Everybody Loves Peter (1959) – Bernd Werding
- The Rest Is Silence (1959) – Mike R. Krantz
- The Ideal Woman (1959) – Jaroslaw Martini
- The Merry War of Captain Pedro (1959) – Eduard von Persipan, Obrist
- Paradise for Sailors (1959) – Seemann Kai Brinkmann
- Frauen in Teufels Hand (1960) – Emil
- Pension Schöller (1960) – Eugen Rümpel
- Crime Tango (1960) – Taschen-August
- You Don't Shoot at Angels (1960) – Federico
- Who Are You, Mr. Sorge? (1961) – Meissinger
- The Adventures of Count Bobby (1961) – Slippery, Gangster aus Chicago
- Junge Leute brauchen Liebe (1961) – Pierre Papillon jr.
- Die Fledermaus (1962) – Prinz Orlofsky
- Charley's Aunt (1963, TV film) – Lord Fancourt Babberley
- The Spendthrift (1964) – Chevalier Dumont
- Champagne for Savages (1964) – Kaubach
- Emma Hamilton (1968) – George Romney
- Shadow of Angels (1975) – Chief of Police: Mülller II
- Kamikaze 1989 (1982) – Konzernchef
- The Roaring Fifties (1983) – Udo von Gerresheim
