= Schweik's Awkward Years =

1964 film

- Directed by: Wolfgang Liebeneiner
- Written by: Géza von Cziffra; Heinz Pauck
- Based on: The Good Soldier Schweik by Jaroslav Hasek
- Produced by: Herbert Gruber; Karl Schwetter
- Starring: Peter Alexander; Rudolf Prack; Gunther Philipp
- Cinematography: Friedl Behn-Grund
- Edited by: Arnfried Heyne
- Music by: Johannes Fehring
- Production companies: Herbert Gruber Produktion; Sascha Film
- Distributed by: Gloria Film
- Release date: 16 January 1964
- Running time: 92 minutes
- Country: Austria
- Language: German

Schweik's Awkward Years or Schweik's Years of Indiscretion (German: Schwejk's Flegeljahre) is a 1964 Austrian comedy film directed by Wolfgang Liebeneiner and starring Peter Alexander, Rudolf Prack and Gunther Philipp. It is based on the novel The Good Soldier Schweik by Jaroslav Hasek.

It was shot at the Rosenhügel Studios in Vienna. The film's sets were designed by the art directors Fritz Jüptner-Jonstorff and Alexander Sawczynski.

== Synopsis ==
Shortly before the First World War, the son of a Prague butcher is called up for military service in the Austro-Hungarian Army of Emperor Franz Joseph, proving to be a very incompetent recruit.

== Cast ==
- Peter Alexander as Josef Schwejk
- Rudolf Prack as Major Ferdinand Hruschkowitz
- Gunther Philipp as Anton Loschek, Profos
- Lotte Ledl as Anna Pospischil, Stubenmädchen
- Hannelore Auer as Helene Hruschkowitz
- Susi Nicoletti as Amanda Hruschkowitz
- Erwin Strahl as Oberleutnant Gustl Wiedenstein
- Rolf Kutschera as Hauptmann Pokorny
- Oskar Wegrostek as Frantisek Schwejk
- Franz Muxeneder as Feldwebel Kotorek
- Hans Unterkircher as General
- Inge Toifl as Gräfin Timburg
- Karl Hruschka as Kratochwill, Postbote
- Hugo Gottschlich as Ververka, 2. Profos
- Dany Sigel as Hannelore Pivonka
- Walter Regelsberger as Oberleutnant Fiala
- Hans Habietinek as Mtula, Rechnungsfeldwebel
- Raoul Retzer as Stabsarzt
- Erna Schickl as Roserl

== Bibliography ==
- Von Dassanowsky, Robert. Austrian Cinema: A History. McFarland, 2005.
