= Ernst Stankovski =

Austrian actor (1928–2022)

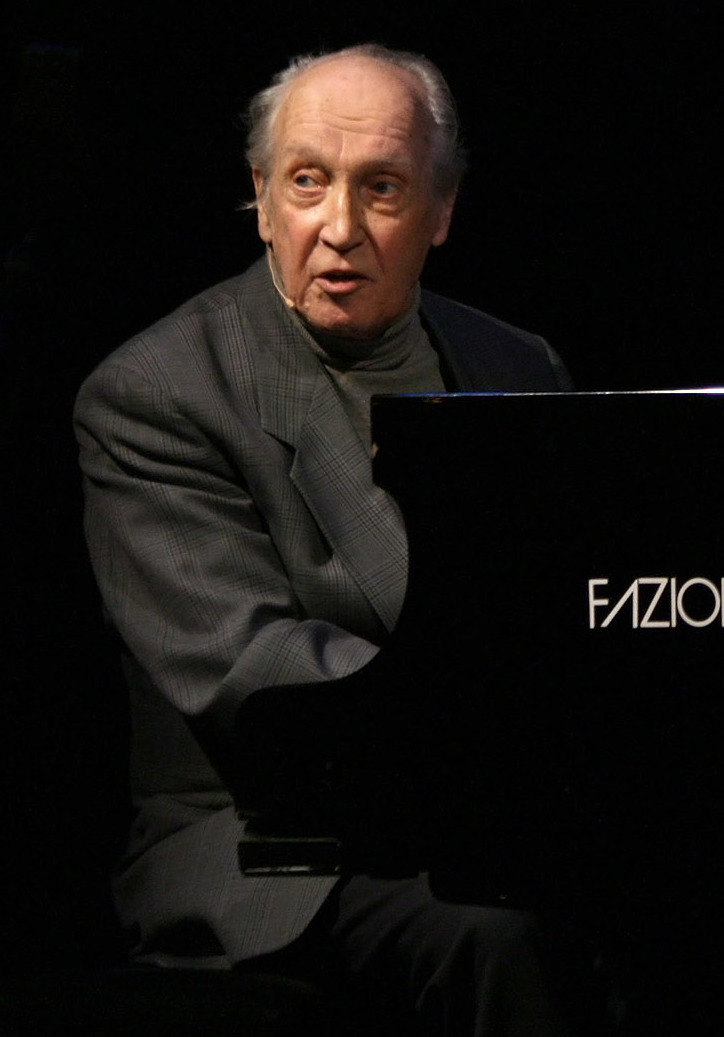
- Stankovski in 2011
- Born: 16 June 1928; Vienna, Austria
- Died: 26 January 2022 (aged 93); Klosterneuburg, Austria
- Occupation: Actor
- Years active: 1949–2022

Ernst Stankovski (16 June 1928 – 26 January 2022) was an Austrian actor.

He appeared in more than one hundred films since 1949. Stankovski died in Klosterneuburg on 26 January 2022, at the age of 93.

== Selected filmography ==
Year	Title	Role	Notes
1952	1. April 2000		
1953	To Be Without Worries	Herr Sanders	
1954	Cabaret	Karl Haller	
1955	André and Ursula	Wendelin	
1958	The Copper	Willy Goede	
1960	The Good Soldier Schweik	Oberleutnant Lukas	
1961	Kauf dir einen bunten Luftballon	Peter Bertram	
1963	Leutnant Gustl	Oberleutnant Doschensky	TV film
1966	Kostenpflichtig zum Tode verurteilt	Jerzy Sosnowski	TV film
1969	The Sweet Pussycats	Graf d'Alzay	
1969	Help, I Love Twins	Ziborius	
1971	The Captain	Chief Mate Meier-Pollex	
1979	Goetz von Berlichingen of the Iron Hand	Liebetraut	
1979	The First Polka	Wondrak	
1990	The Master of the Day of Judgment	Eugen Bischoff	TV film
1991	Death Came As a Friend	Philipp	TV film
2007	An Old Maid	Mr. Nolde	TV film
2009	Der Mann aus der Pfalz	Konrad Adenauer	TV film

=== Television series ===
Year	TV Show	Role	Notes
1969–1977	Erkennen Sie die Melodie?		
1995	Inspector Rex: Bring me Beethoven's Head	Bernhard Kronhauser	TV series episode
