= Susi Nicoletti =

German actress (1918–2005)

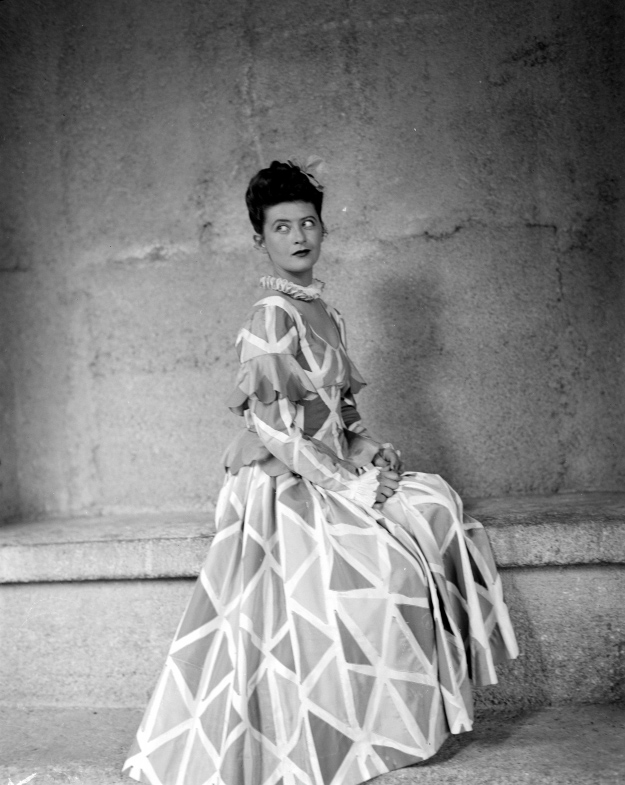
Susi Nicoletti as Smeraldina in the play The Servant of Two Masters during the Salzburg Festival 1946

Susi Nicoletti (3 September 1918 – 5 June 2005) was a Bavarian-born actress best remembered today for over 100 supporting roles mostly in comedy films. She was born as Susanne Emilie Luise Adele Habersack in Munich, but spent most of her childhood with her parents in Amsterdam. Back in Munich, she made her stage debut at age 13. Two years later, she became a ballerina.

In the early 1930s she turned to cabaret. In 1939, she was offered her first film role. In 1940 she moved to Vienna, where she became a member of the Burgtheater. After her retirement in 1992, she continued her stage career at the Theater in der Josefstadt. For decades, Nicoletti taught acting and dance at the prestigious Max Reinhardt Seminar in Vienna. Her husband, Ernst Haeussermann, was a theatre director.

== Death ==
Nicoletti died in Vienna of complications after heart surgery, aged 86.

== Selected filmography ==
- A Mother's Love (1939) - Franzi Pirlinger - 1922
- Judgement Day (1940) - Marianne Strubel
- Oh, diese Männer (1941) - Lilly
- Sommerliebe (1942) - Irma
- Der zweite Schuß (1943) - Irene Neuhaus
- The Singing House (1947) - Fritzi, Sekretärin
- Umwege zu dir (1947)
- Gottes Engel sind überall (1948) - Liesl Fischer
- Philine (1949) - Berthe Paradis
- Liebesheirat (1949) - Pucki Hildebrand
- Nothing But Coincidence (1949) - Liane Reitmayer
- Kleiner Schwindel am Wolfgangsee (1949) - Anny Bird
- Mein Freund, der nicht nein sagen konnte (1949) - Elfi
- Jetzt schlägt's 13 (1950) - Hedy Jaconis
- No Sin on the Alpine Pastures (1950) - Annerl Pfundhammer
- Der alte Sünder (1951) - Yvonne Farini
- Eine Frau mit Herz (1951) - Hilde Straßmeier
- Eva erbt das Paradies (1951) - Daisy Jordan
- Hello Porter (1952) - Susi
- Voices of Spring (1952) - Rosi
- Ideal Woman Sought (1952) - Chérie
- The Day Before the Wedding (1952) - Frl. Kluge
- Ich und meine Frau (1953) - Yvonne
- Irene in Trouble (1953) - Vera Cirmann
- Grandstand for General Staff (1953) - Frau Rittmeister v. Mirkowitsch
- Hochzeit auf Reisen (1953) - Ly Ballacz
- Roses from the South (1954) - Janine Rocca
- Kaisermanöver (1954) - Gräfin Trangini
- Schützenliesel (1954) - Cornelia
- The Blue Danube (1955) - Gräfin Eichenfels
- Marriage Sanitarium (1955) - Amanda Dietze
- One Woman Is Not Enough? (1955) - Madame Colette
- Die Deutschmeister (1955) - Comtesse Nanette
- Yes, Yes, Love in Tyrol (1955) - Barbara Tusma
- Sonnenschein und Wolkenbruch (1955)
- Symphonie in Gold (1956) - Mathilde Seidlitz
- And Who Is Kissing Me? (1956) - Kitty Lindner
- Liebe, die den Kopf verliert (1956) - Baronin Jasmin von Arnau
- Lügen haben hübsche Beine (1956)
- Ein tolles Hotel (1956) - Anna Bender
- Die Rosel vom Schwarzwald (1956) - Vera
- Ein Mann muß nicht immer schön sein (1956) - Marla Carlotti
- Uns gefällt die Welt (1956) - Reseda
- The Beautiful Master (1956) - Lisa
- Die liebe Familie (1957) - Maria Jurancy
- August der Halbstarke (1957) - Mimi Rums
- Zwei Herzen voller Seligkeit (1957) - Frau von Gregory
- The Winemaker of Langenlois (1957) - Stefanie Köster, Weinhändlerin
- Confessions of Felix Krull (1957) - Madame Houpflé
- Wie schön, daß es dich gibt (1957) - Jeanette Valeur
- Junger Mann, der alles kann (1957) - Baronin
- Egon, der Frauenheld (1957)
- The Count of Luxembourg (1957) - Caroline, Erbgräfin von Luxemburg
- An American in Salzburg (1958) - Frau Coopers Hausdame
- Man ist nur zweimal jung (1958) - Marie-Therese
- Trees Are Blooming in Vienna (1958) - Isabella
- One Should Be Twenty Again (1958) - Jenny Dill
- Hoch klingt der Radetzkymarsch (1958) - Leonie von Heymendorf
- Rendezvous in Vienna (1959) - Milli
- Hula-Hopp, Conny (1959) - Diana Haller
- Immer die Mädchen (1959) - Sportlehrerin Florence Henderson
- Dream Revue (1959) - Frau Schmitt
- I'm Marrying the Director (1960) - Frau von Wittekind
- Crime Tango (1960) - Frau Schleinitz
- The Adventures of Count Bobby (1961) - Mrs. Evelyn Piper
- … und du mein Schatz bleibst hier (1961) - Gräfin von Kokowsky
- Mariandl (1961) - Franzi
- Ein Stern fällt vom Himmel (1961) - Katie Held
- Die Fledermaus (1962) - Baroness Martens
- The Turkish Cucumbers (1962) - Susanne, seine Gattin
- Das ist die Liebe der Matrosen (1962) - Tante Agathe
- Mariandls Heimkehr (1962) - Franzi
- Schweik's Awkward Years (1964) - Amanda Hruschkowitz
- I Learned It from Father (1964) - Dora Bauer
- Sie nannten ihn Krambambuli (1972) - Therese
- The Mimosa Wants to Blossom Too (1976) - Emily Hopkins
- Feuerwerk (1976) - Mutter
- Tödliche Liebe (1995)
- Das zehnte Jahr (1995) - Guest
- Comedian Harmonists (1997) - Frau Grunbaum
- On the Other Side of the Bridge (2002) - Old Fanny

== Decorations and awards ==
- 1977 - Austrian Cross of Honour for Science and Art, 1st class
- 1978 - Gold Medal of Honour of the capital Vienna
- 1997 - Nestroy Ring
- 2000 - Platinum Romy for lifetime achievement
- 2004 - Undine Award - for your life's work as a young supporter
- 2005 - Gold Medal of the City of Vienna
