= Guido Wieland =

Austrian actor (1906–1993)

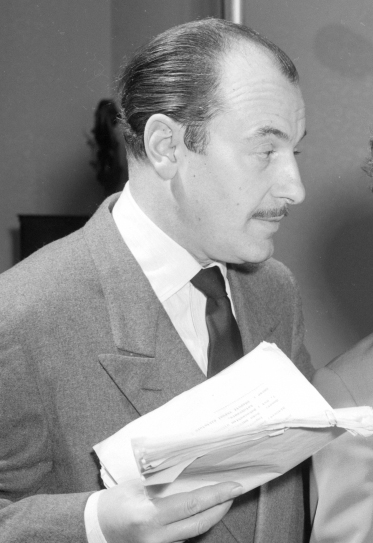
- Born: 18 November 1906; Vienna, Austro-Hungarian Empire
- Died: 10 March 1993 (aged 86); Vienna, Austria
- Occupation: Actor
- Years active: 1951-1993 (film & TV)

Guido Wieland (1906–1993) was an Austrian stage, film and television actor.

== Selected filmography ==
- 1. April 2000 (1952)
- Adventure in Vienna (1952)
- The Doctor's Secret (1955)
- And Who Is Kissing Me? (1956)
- Scandal in Bad Ischl (1957)
- Eva (1958)
- The Street (1958)
- Girls for the Mambo-Bar (1959)
- The Good Soldier Schweik (1960)
- An Alibi for Death (1963)
- Come Fly with Me (1963)
- Help, My Bride Steals (1964)
- I Learned It from Father (1964)
- House of Pleasure (1969)
- Father Brown (1966–1968, TV series)
- Like a Tear in the Ocean (1970, TV miniseries)
- The Reverend Turns a Blind Eye (1971)
- Always Trouble with the Reverend (1971)
- The First Polka (1979)
- Egon Schiele – Exzess und Bestrafung (1980)
- Land, das meine Sprache spricht (1980, TV film)

== Bibliography ==
- Mitchell, Charles P. The Great Composers Portrayed on Film, 1913 through 2002. McFarland, 2004.
