= Twelve Girls and One Man =

1959 film

- Directed by: Hans Quest
- Written by: Wolfgang Ebert (play); Kurt Nachmann; Hellmut Andics
- Produced by: Herbert Gruber
- Starring: Toni Sailer; Margit Nünke; Gunther Philipp
- Cinematography: Sepp Ketterer; Hannes Staudinger
- Edited by: Herma Sandtner
- Music by: Franz Grothe
- Production company: Sascha Film
- Distributed by: Sascha Film; UFA Film Hansa
- Release date: 15 October 1959
- Running time: 98 minutes
- Country: Austria
- Language: German

Twelve Girls and One Man (German: Zwölf Mädchen und ein Mann) is a 1959 Austrian comedy film directed by Hans Quest and starring Toni Sailer, Margit Nünke and Gunther Philipp.

It was shot at the Rosenhügel Studios in Vienna. The film's sets were designed by the art directors Theodor Harisch and Fritz Jüptner-Jonstorff.

== Synopsis ==
Following a series of robberies, a detective goes undercover at an Alpine ski resort while at the same time twelve female students arrive there on holiday.

== Cast ==
- Toni Sailer as Florian Thaler
- Margit Nünke as Eva, genannt 'Amazone'
- Gunther Philipp as Anderl Seidl, Hilfsgendarm
- Gerlinde Locker as Rosel Fuchs
- Joe Stöckel as Bürgermeister Fuchs
- Ernst Waldbrunn as Josef Walz - Gendarmerieposten-Kommandant
- Helga Schlack as Monika, genannt 'Mondänika'
- Veronika Bayer as Mäuschen, 'Die Unscheinbare'
- Ursula Heyer as Ruth 'Die Pedantische'
- Grit Boettcher as Do 'Lady Superfein'
- Martha Hauser as Coco, 'Der Papagei'
- Rosemarie Kirstein as Grit, 'Miß Kurvenreich'
- Lisbeth Gemzell as Sweety, 'Die wandelnde Konditorei'
- Eva Iro as Lizzi, 'Die Junke-Box'
- Ingemarie Tramm as Mimi, 'Mimosa, die Gekränkte'
- Susanne Cronau as Vera 'Die Nahrhafte'
- Monika Berger as Sabine, 'Die Handgestrickte'
- Wolf Neuber as Der stramme Max
- Raoul Retzer as Gentleman-Schorschi
- Rudolf Strobl as Rittmeister Lanz

== Bibliography ==
- Elisabeth Büttner & Christian Dewald. Anschluss an Morgen: eine Geschichte des österreichischen Films von 1945 bis zur Gegenwart. Residenz Verlag, 1997.
