= Scandal in Bad Ischl =

1957 film

- Directed by: Rolf Thiele
- Written by: Hermann Bahr (novel); Eberhard Keindorff; Johanna Sibelius
- Produced by: Otto Dürer
- Starring: O.W. Fischer; Elisabeth Müller; Ivan Desny
- Cinematography: Klaus von Rautenfeld
- Edited by: Hilwa von Boro
- Music by: Bruno Uher
- Production company: Vienna Film
- Distributed by: Schorcht Filmverleih
- Release date: 3 December 1957
- Running time: 94 minutes
- Country: Austria
- Language: German

Scandal in Bad Ischl (German: Skandal in Ischl) is a 1957 Austrian historical comedy film directed by Rolf Thiele and starring O.W. Fischer, Elisabeth Müller and Ivan Desny. The film takes place in 1910 in the spa town of Bad Ischl.

The film's sets were designed by the art director Felix Smetana. It was shot in Agfacolor.

== Cast ==
- O.W. Fischer as Dr. Franz Duhr
- Elisabeth Müller as Viola Duhr
- Ivan Desny as Graf Vanin
- Nina Sandt as Marquise de Laforge
- Doris Kirchner as Ida, Sprechstundenhilfe
- Harry Meyen as Dr. Balsam, Assistenzarzt
- Michael Ande as Prinz Franz
- Alma Seidler as Erzherzogin Marie Antonie
- Raoul Retzer as Podlasni
- Senta Wengraf as Gräfin Ens
- Egon von Jordan
- Elisabeth Stiepl
- Edith Elmay as Mizzi
- Guido Wieland as Medizinalrat Duhr
- Carola Rasch as Komtesse Nina
- Hugo Lindinger as Bürgermeister
- Christl Erber as Therese Holzapfel
- Fritz Holzer as Redakteur Wieslinger
- Lutz Landers as Baron Bruno von Waldeck
- Helmut Lex as Leutnant Willi von Waldeck
- Rudolf Forster as Fürst Emanuel
- Susanne Engelhart as Julia, seine Frau
- Lorli Fischer as Rosi
- Willi Meissl-Berling as Dr. Hoffmann
- Karl Schellenberg as Dr. Swoboda

== Bibliography ==
- Robert Dassanowsky. Austrian Cinema. McFarland & Co, 2005.
