= Adrienne Gessner =

Austrian actress (1896–1987)

- Born: 23 July 1896; Schottwien, Austro-Hungarian Empire
- Died: 23 June 1987 (aged 90); Vienna, Austria
- Other name: Adrienne Geiringer
- Occupation: Actress
- Years active: 1931–1980 (film)

Adrienne Gessner (23 July 1896 – 23 June 1987) was an Austrian actress. Gessner appeared in over fifty film and television shows during her career, including the 1955 costume film Royal Hunt in Ischl. Gessner appeared in a mixture of German and Austrian films during her career. Following the Anchluss of 1938 she fled with her Jewish husband Ernst Lothar to the United States, returning after the Second World War.

== Filmography ==
Year	Title	Role	Notes
1931	Die große Liebe	Rosa	
1936	Catherine the Last	Berta, Köchin	
1948	The Angel with the Trumpet	Fürstin Pauline Metternich	
1948	After the Storm	Captain Virginia Jenkins	
1949	Vagabonds	Mademoiselle Belet	
1951	The Merry Farmer	Frau Holefka	
1952	Voices of Spring	Directrice	
1952	Adventure in Vienna	Frau Anna Fraser	
1952	Ich hab' mich so an Dich gewöhnt	Tante Helene Meyer	
1952	No Time for Flowers	Mama Svoboda	
1952	Hannerl	Elfie Möller	
1953	Stolen Identity	Mrs. Fraser	
1953	Grandstand for General Staff	Gräfin Kopsch-Grantignan, ihre Mutter	
1954	The First Kiss	Omi	
1954	The Witch		
1955	The Blue Danube	Fürstin	
1955	Marriage Sanitarium	Frau Lehmann	
1955	Die Deutschmeister	Gräfin Burgstetten	
1955	Royal Hunt in Ischl	Gräfin Lahousen	
1955	I Often Think of Piroschka	Ilonka von Csiky	
1956	Crown Prince Rudolph's Last Love	Baronin Vetsera	
1956	The Golden Bridge	Tante Jula	
1956	Das Liebesleben des schönen Franz	Ida Sorgmann, Eheberaterin	
1956	Rosmarie kommt aus Wildwest	Berta, seine Frau	
1957	Die liebe Familie	Omi Pollinger	
1957	Salzburg Stories	Karoline	
1957	The Schimeck Family	Tante Rosa	
1958	Meine schöne Mama	Fräulein Greiz	
1958	The Trapp Family in America	Mrs. Hammerfield	
1958	Resurrection	Tante Sonja	
1959	Herrn Josefs letzte Liebe	Fräulein Auguste	
1960	I'm Marrying the Director	Luise Stahlmann	
1960	A Breath of Scandal	Amelia	
1961	The Adventures of Count Bobby	Gräfin Henriette von Ratzeberg	
1961	Das Riesenrad	Adele von Hill	
1962	Waldrausch	Die Zieblingen	
1963	Bekenntnisse eines möblierten Herrn	Fürstin Mutter	
1963	The Model Boy	Elisabeth Geyer	
1964	The Spendthrift	Ein altes Weib	
1979	Tales from the Vienna Woods	Alfred's Grandmother	

== Bibliography ==
- Fritsche, Maria. Homemade Men In Postwar Austrian Cinema: Nationhood, Genre and Masculinity . Berghahn Books, 2013.
- Vansant, Jacqueline. Reclaiming Heimat: Trauma and Mourning in Memoirs by Jewish Austrian Reémigrés. Wayne State University Press, 2001.
