= Karl Ehmann =

Austrian actor (1882–1967)

- Born: 13 August 1882; Vienna, Austria-Hungary (now Austria)
- Died: 1 November 1967 (aged 85); Vienna, Austria
- Occupation: Actor
- Years active: 1902–66

Karl Ehmann (13 August 1882 – 1 November 1967) was an Austrian stage and film actor whose career spanned both the silent and sound eras of the film industry.

== Career ==
Born on 13 August 1882 in Vienna, Austria-Hungary, he became interested in acting as a young man, studying in a private master class with the famous Austrian stage actor, Karl Arnau. He made his stage debut at the age of 20 in the municipal theater of Olomouc, Moravia (now part of the Czech Republic). Over the next five years he would appear in productions in Meran, South Tyrol, Linz, Upper Austria, and Graz, Austria. In 1908 he would begin a 30-year association with the Deutsche Volkstheater in Vienna.

While he concentrated mostly on the theater during his early career, he did appear in a small role in the Austrian film Der Unbekannte (The Unknown) in 1912. In 1917, he would again begin performing in films, and during the late 1910s through the mid-20s, he had a successful run of starring and featured roles in silent films. Some of the more notable silent films in which he starred were: Der Doppelselbstmord (1918), Die Ahnfrau (1919), Der tanzende Tod (1920), Der tote Hochzeitsgast (1921), Hoffmanns Erzählungen (1923), and Durch Nacht und Eis (1926), which Ehmann also directed. He also directed two other films, Junggesellenwirtschaft (1920) and Faustrecht (1922), as well as penning the scripts for Junggesellenwirtschaft and Verschneit (1920).

In the mid-1920s Ehmann would take a hiatus from the film industry, choosing to focus on his theatrical career. In the early 1930s he would return to making films, although with the advent of sound, the size of his roles diminished, and he played mostly small, or featured supporting parts. Over his 50-year film career, he appeared in over 100 films, mostly in Austria, but also in Germany later in his career. Some of the more notable films in which he appeared include: Fräulein Lilli (1936) directed by Hans Behrendt, Robert Wohlmuth and Max Neufeld, and starring Franciska Gaal; Thirteen Chairs (1938), starring Heinz Rühmann; 1940's Der Postmeister, directed by Gustav Ucicky; Schicksal (1942), directed by Géza von Bolváry, and starring Heinrich George, Werner Hinz and Christian Kayßler; Die Kreuzlschreiber (1950), directed by Eduard von Borsody; and The Forester of the Silver Wood (1954), in which he had one of his infrequent starring roles. In 1956 he would appear in the comedy The Trapp Family, based on the memoirs of Maria von Trapp, which became the inspiration for the hugely successful American Broadway musical, The Sound of Music, and the subsequent American film of the same name.

Towards the end of his career, Ehmann would also appear in several television films for German and Austrian TV. Ehmann died on 1 November 1967 at the age of 85, in his home town of Vienna. He is buried in the Zentralfriedhof in Vienna.

== Selected filmography ==
- 1912: Der Unbekannte
- The Stain of Shame (1917)
- The Spendthrift (1917)
- Don Cesar, Count of Irun (1918)
- Double Suicide (1918)
- Rigoletto (1918)
- The Ancestress (1919)
- Eva, The Sin (1920)
- 1920: Freut Euch des Lebens
- The Master of Life (1920)
- 1920: Der Leiermann
- Let the Little Ones Come to Me (1920)
- The Voice of Conscience (1920)
- The Dancing Death (1920)
- 1920: Verschneit
- 1921: Eine Million Dollar
- Light of His Life (1921)
- The Dead Wedding Guest (1922)
- The Tales of Hoffmann (1923)
- The Iron King (1923)
- 1931: Purpur und Waschblau
- Three on a Honeymoon (1932)
- Our Emperor (1933)
- Voices of Spring (1933)
- A Star Fell from Heaven (1934)
- The White Horse Inn (1935)
- Fräulein Lilli (1936)
- Hannerl and Her Lovers (1936)
- 1936: Mädchenpensionat
- 1936: Singende Jugend
- Darling of the Sailors (1937)
- The Charm of La Boheme (1937)
- Thirteen Chairs (1938)
- 1938: Konzert in Tirol
- Mirror of Life (1938)
- A Mother's Love (1939)
- Der Postmeister (1940)
- 1940: Ein Leben lang
- Destiny (1942)
- Late Love (1943)
- The Heart Must Be Silent (1944)
- 1948: Ein Mann gehört ins Haus
- Vagabonds (1949)
- Cordula (1950)
- 1950: Die Kreuzlschreiber
- Der Seelenbräu (1950)
- 1951: Der fidele Bauer
- Maria Theresa (1951)
- Verklungenes Wien (1951)
- 1951: Stadtpark
- 1. April 2000 (1952)
- 1952: Ich hab' mich so an Dich gewöhnt
- Desires (1952)
- 1953: Franz Schubert – Ein Leben in zwei Sätzen
- Bruder Martin (1954)
- The Forester of the Silver Wood (1954)
- Walking Back into the Past (1954)
- 1955: Das Mädchen vom Pfarrhof
- Espionage (1955)
- Her First Date (1955)
- 1955: Oh – diese "lieben" Verwandten
- The Blue Danube (1955)
- Crown Prince Rudolph's Last Love (1956)
- 1956: Liebe, die den Kopf verliert
- The Trapp Family (1956)
- 1957: Eva küßt nur Direktoren
- And Lead Us Not Into Temptation (1957)
- Sissi – Fateful Years of an Empress (1957)
- The Priest and the Girl (1958)
- 1958: Hoch klingt der Radetzkymarsch
- One Should Be Twenty Again (1958)
- The Sweet Life of Count Bobby (1962)
- Wedding Night in Paradise (1962)
- 1965: Radetzkymarsch
