= 1. April 2000 =

1952 film by Wolfgang Liebeneiner

- Directed by: Wolfgang Liebeneiner
- Written by: Rudolf Brunngraber; Ernst Marboe
- Produced by: Karl Ehrlich
- Starring: Hilde Krahl; Josef Meinrad
- Cinematography: Sepp Ketterer; Karl Löb; Fritz Arno Wagner
- Edited by: Henny Brünsch-Tauschinsky
- Music by: Josef Fiedler; Alois Melichar; Robert Stolz
- Distributed by: Herzog Filmverleih; Lewis Productions Inc.
- Release date: 19 November 1952
- Running time: 105 minutes
- Country: Austria
- Language: German

1. April 2000 is a 1952 Austrian political satire film directed by Wolfgang Liebeneiner and starring Hilde Krahl, made during the Allied Occupation of Austria (1945–55). The script was reportedly commissioned at the request of the Austrian government, and is a political satire depicting a harmless, potentially congenial future Austria still subject to needless and stifling oversight by the four Allied powers, as established following the defeat of Nazi Germany in World War II (as it was when the film was made). The film was entered into the 1953 Cannes Film Festival.

== Plot summary ==
After numerous fruitless negotiations with the Allies about the independence of Austria, the Austrian prime minister prompts his fellow countrymen to shred their four-language identity cards, which have been issued by the Allies, thus sending a clear signal to the world. Thereupon, Austria is charged for breaking the "world peace" at the fictitious "world court". The implicated message is clear: in the same manner as Austria was, in Austria's eyes, falsely indicted for breaking the world peace (1914 and 1939), they are now being indicted again in 2000.

The world court hovers in with its space rocket into Vienna and lands in front of Schönbrunn Palace. The Austrians now have to prove that they are a lovely nation, and that they would never break the world peace. Subsequently, everything which is supposed to make Austria lovely is presented, starting with Mozart, going over Prince Eugene of Savoy, Empress Maria Theresa of Austria, Viennese wine, the Viennese waltz, the mountains, the classic bands, etc. Despite the presented evidence, Austria will be found guilty. Just before the conviction, the Moscow Declaration of 1943 is discovered. The declaration clearly states that Austria is to be freed, which happens at the end of the film. Back in the current time of 1952, and in reality, it is bemoaned that those actions and the independence of Austria will not take place until the year 2000.

== Cast ==
Actor	Role
Hilde Krahl	President of the Global Union
Josef Meinrad	Prime Minister of Austria
Waltraut Haas	Mitzi
Judith Holzmeister	Ina Equiquiza
Elisabeth Stemberger	Sekretärin
Ulrich Bettac	Moderator Robinson
Karl Ehmann	Cabinet Chief
Peter Gerhard	Hieronymus Gallup
Curd Jürgens	Capitano Herakles
Robert Michal	Wei Yao Chee
Heinz Moog	Hajji Halef Omar
Guido Wieland	Alessandro Bibalini
Paul Hörbiger	Augustin
Hans Moser	Composer
Pepi Glöckner-Kramer	
Martha Marbo	
Eva Payrer	
Erika Pirschl	
Erna Schickl	
Marianne Schönauer	
Alma Seidler	Reporterin
Anneliese Stöckl-Eberhard	
Hansi Stork	
Ingeborg Wieser	Alessandro Vitalini
Karl Bachmann	
Theodor Danegger	Russian High Commissioner
Karl Eidlitz	
Hans Frank	
Erik Frey	Prince Eugen
Harry Fuß	Franzl
Hugo Gottschlich	
Fred Hennings	German Emperor
Franz Herterich	American High Commissioner
Hans Holt	
Fritz Imhoff	
Fred Liewehr	
Heribert Meisel	
Alfred Neugebauer	Finance Minister
Toni Nießner	
Hans Richter	Reporter
Leopold Rudolf	
Stefan Skodler	
Ernst Stankovski	
Otto Treßler	English High Commissioner
Hans Ziegler	French High Commissioner
Kurt Bülau	
Rita Gallos	
Edith Prager	
Helmut Qualtinger	
Gerhard Riedmann	Reitender Bote (uncredited)
Die Wiener Sängerknaben	Singers
