= Johannes Fehring =

Austrian composer (1926–2004)

- Born: 14 November 1926; Vienna, Austria
- Died: 4 January 2004 (aged 77); Vienna, Austria
- Other name: Johannes Fernbach
- Occupation: Composer
- Years active: 1952-1983 (film)

Johannes Fehring (14 November 1926 – 4 January 2004) was an Austrian composer, who worked on a number of film scores.

== Selected filmography ==
- Ideal Woman Sought (1952)
- Emperor's Ball (1956)
- Mariandl (1961)
- Dance with Me Into the Morning (1962)
- The Merry Widow (1962)
- The Model Boy (1963)
- With Best Regards (1963)
- Don't Fool with Me (1963)
- I Learned It from Father (1964)
- Help, My Bride Steals (1964)
- Schweik's Awkward Years (1964)
- Call of the Forest (1965)
- In Bed by Eight (1965)
- The Great Happiness (1967)

== Bibliography ==
- Bergfelder, Tim. International Adventures: German Popular Cinema and European Co-productions in the 1960s. Berghahn Books, 2005.

Preceded by (Luxembourg) Jean Rodères	Eurovision Song Contest conductor 1967	Succeeded by (United Kingdom) Norrie Paramor
