= Richard Romanowsky =

Austrian actor

- Born: 21 April 1883; Vienna, Austria-Hungary (now Austria)
- Died: 22 July 1968 (aged 85); Steyr, Austria
- Occupation: Actor
- Years active: 1932-1961

Richard Romanowsky (21 April 1883 – 22 July 1968) was an Austrian actor. He appeared in 45 films between 1932 and 1961.

== Selected filmography ==
- Two in a Car (1932)
- Adventure on the Southern Express (1934)
- Farewell Waltz (1934)
- Winter Night's Dream (1935)
- The Valley of Love (1935)
- Make Me Happy (1935)
- The Night With the Emperor (1936)
- Confetti (1936)
- Adventure in Warsaw (1937)
- The Charm of La Boheme (1937)
- Not a Word About Love (1937)
- Darling of the Sailors (1937)
- Marionette (1939)
- Beloved Augustin (1940)
- Women Are No Angels (1943)
- Carnival of Love (1943)
- Mask in Blue (1943)
- The Singing House (1948)
- Season in Salzburg (1952)
- Hannerl (1952)
- Grandstand for General Staff (1953)
- Mask in Blue (1953)
- Two Blue Eyes (1955)
- Salzburg Stories (1957)
- One Should Be Twenty Again (1958)
- Season in Salzburg (1961)
