= Guitars Sound Softly Through the Night =

1960 film

- Directed by: Hans Deppe
- Written by: Janne Furch; Werner Hill
- Produced by: Herbert Gruber
- Starring: Fred Bertelmann; Margit Nünke; Vivi Bach
- Cinematography: Walter Tuch
- Edited by: Herma Sandtner
- Music by: Charly Niessen
- Production companies: Lux-Film; Sascha Film
- Distributed by: Prisma Film (West Germany)
- Release date: 19 February 1960
- Running time: 84 minutes
- Country: Austria
- Language: German

Guitars Sound Softly Through the Night (German: Gitarren klingen leise durch die Nacht) is a 1960 Austrian romantic musical film directed by Hans Deppe and starring Fred Bertelmann, Margit Nünke and Vivi Bach.

It was shot at the Rosenhügel Studios in Vienna and on location in Sicily. The film's sets were designed by the art directors Fritz Jüptner-Jonstorff and Alexander Sawczynski.

== Cast ==
- Fred Bertelmann as Fred Wiskott
- Margit Nünke as Ninon Lorraine
- Vivi Bach as Marina
- Peter Weck as Toni Weinheber
- Walter Gross as Paulchen Sperling
- Friedl Czepa as Lucie
- Gaetano Stancampiano as Roberto
- Walter Wilz as Jacopo
- Grit Boettcher as Eleanor
- Fritz Imhoff as Postbote Gerlach
- Alfred Böhm
- Teo Prokop
- Hedy Richter as Solotänzerin
- Gerhard Senft as Solotänzer

== Bibliography ==
- Gerhard Bliersbach. So grün war die Heide: der deutsche Nachkriegsfilm in neuer Sicht. Beltz, 1985.
