= The Immortal Face =

1947 film by Géza von Cziffra

- Directed by: Géza von Cziffra
- Written by: Géza von Cziffra
- Based on: The Immortal Face by Géza von Cziffra
- Produced by: Géza von Cziffra
- Starring: Marianne Schönauer; O.W. Fischer; Helene Thimig
- Cinematography: Ludwig Berger
- Edited by: Arnfried Heyne
- Music by: Alois Melichar
- Production company: Cziffra-Film
- Distributed by: Sascha Film; Primsa Film (Germany)
- Release date: 10 October 1947
- Running time: 100 minutes
- Country: Austria
- Language: German

The Immortal Face (German: Das unsterbliche Antlitz) is a 1947 Austrian historical drama film directed by Géza von Cziffra and starring Marianne Schönauer, O.W. Fischer and Helene Thimig. The film's sets were designed by the art director Fritz Jüptner-Jonstorff. Géza von Cziffra adapted the screenplay from his own 1943 play of the same title.

== Cast ==
- Marianne Schönauer as Nana Risi
- O.W. Fischer as Anselm Feuerbach
- Helene Thimig as Henriette Feuerbach, seine Schwiegermutter
- Siegfried Breuer as Fürst Catti
- Attila Hörbiger as Julius Allgeyer
- Dagny Servaes as Mutter Risi
- Heinrich Ortmayer as Giuseppe Risi
- Fritz Gehlen as Tonio Risi
- Till Hausmann as Klein Tonio
- Ditta Donnah as Lucia
- Erik Frey as Campbell
- Erich Ziegel as Rechtsanwalt Cipola
- C.W. Fernbach as Herr von Landshof
- Ernst Waldbrunn as Baron Schlick
- Monika Peters as Hildegard von Schlick
- Gandolf Buschbeck as Alessandro
- Oskar Hugelmann as Pater Brazo
- Emmi Rügenau as Frau Belleguardia
- Helli Servi as Laura
- Ena Valduga as Frau Zuchi
- Erik Walter as Major Tivaldi
- Gustl Werner as Pietro, ein Diener

== Bibliography ==
- Fritsche, Maria. Homemade Men in Postwar Austrian Cinema: Nationhood, Genre and Masculinity. Berghahn Books, 2013.
