= The Winemaker of Langenlois =

- Directed by: Hans H. König
- Written by: A.N. Schneider (novel) Johannes Kai (novel); Werner Eplinius; Janne Furch; Wolf Neuber
- Produced by: Heinz Nitsche
- Starring: Herta Staal; Gunnar Möller; Paul Hörbiger
- Cinematography: Heinz Schnackertz
- Edited by: Margarete Egle; Josefine Ramerstorfer
- Music by: Conny Schumann
- Production company: Helios-Filmproduktion
- Distributed by: Panorama-Film
- Release date: 28 November 1957
- Running time: 82 minutes
- Country: Austria
- Language: German

The Winemaker of Langenlois (German: Die Winzerin von Langenlois) is a 1957 Austrian romantic comedy film directed by Hans H. König and starring Herta Staal, Gunnar Möller and Paul Hörbiger.

== Cast ==
- Herta Staal as Elisabeth Teky, Weingutsbesitzerin
- Gunnar Möller as Jörg Strasser, Volksschullehrer
- Paul Hörbiger as Korbinian Grammelshuber, Verwalter
- Susi Nicoletti as Stefanie Köster, Weinhändlerin
- Peer Schmidt as Richard Köster, ihr Neffe
- Karl Skraup as Gerichtsvollzieher Bindinger
- Hertha Martin as Yvonne Sommer, Schlagersängerin
- Ingeborg Hüttinger as Anni, Wirtschafterin
- Thomas Hörbiger as Kellergehilfe Franz
- Karl Fochler
- Oskar Wegrostek as Anton
- Raoul Retzer as Rottenwieser, Barbesitzer
- Helen Brix
- Peter Horst
- Brigitte Krechler
- Günther Pregler
- Stephan Schwartz
- Christine Kaufmann as Christl, Münchner Ferienkind

== Bibliography ==
- Robert Dassanowsky. Austrian Cinema: A History. McFarland, 2005.
