= The White Horse Inn (1960 film) =

- Peter Alexander at the entrance to the Inn
- German: Im weißen Rößl
- Directed by: Werner Jacobs
- Written by: Helmuth M. Backhaus; Janne Furch; Hans Müller-Einigen (libretto); Erik Charell (libretto); Ralph Benatzky (libretto); Oscar Blumenthal (play); Gustav Kadelburg (play)
- Produced by: Herbert Gruber (producer); Günther Stapenhorst (producer); Walter Tjaden
- Starring: Peter Alexander; Waltraut Haas; Adrian Hoven
- Cinematography: Heinz Schnackertz
- Edited by: Arnfried Heyne
- Music by: Heinz Gietz
- Production companies: Carlton-Film; Sascha-Verleih
- Distributed by: Constantin Film
- Release date: 20 December 1960
- Running time: 103 minutes
- Countries: Austria; West Germany
- Language: German

The White Horse Inn (originally Im weißen Rößl) is a 1960 Austrian-West German musical film directed by Werner Jacobs and starring Peter Alexander, Waltraut Haas and Adrian Hoven. It is based on the 1930 operetta The White Horse Inn by Ralph Benatzky and Robert Stolz

The art directors Willy Schatz, Wolf Englert and Sepp Rothaur designed the film's sets. It was shot at the Bergland Studios in Wels in Upper Austria and on location in St. Wolfgang.

== Cast ==
- Peter Alexander as Leopold Brandmeyer
- Waltraut Haas as Josepha Vogelhuber
- Adrian Hoven as Dr. Siedler
- Karin Dor as Brigitte Giesecke
- Estella Blain as Klärchen Hinzelmann
- Gunther Philipp as Sigismund Sülzheimer
- Werner Finck as Prof. Hinzelmann
- Erik Jelde as Wilhelm Giesecke
- Frithjof Vierock as Piccolo Franzl
- Hugo Lindinger as mayor
- Rudolf Carl as Anton
- Ruth Winter as Mirzl
- Raoul Retzer as Feuerwehrhauptmann
- Hanita Hallan as Verena-Sister
- Fritz Heller as doorman
- Rut Rex as Verena-Sister
- Fritz Lafontaine
