= The Blue Danube (1955 film) =

1955 film

- Directed by: Hans Schweikart
- Written by: Peter Berneis; August Rieger; Jacques Companéez; Georges Tabet; Theodor Ottawa
- Produced by: Ernst Müller
- Starring: Hardy Krüger; Nicole Besnard; Paul Hörbiger
- Cinematography: Sepp Ketterer
- Edited by: Leopoldine Pokorny
- Music by: Franz Grothe
- Production companies: Österreichische Film GmbH; Schönbrunn-Film
- Distributed by: Union-Film
- Release date: 25 January 1955
- Running time: 86 minutes
- Country: Austria
- Language: German

The Blue Danube (German: An der schönen blauen Donau) is a 1955 Austrian romantic comedy film directed by Hans Schweikart and starring Hardy Krüger, Nicole Besnard and Paul Hörbiger. It was shot at the Schönbrunn Studios in Vienna and on location around the city. The film's sets were designed by the art director Fritz Jüptner-Jonstorff.

== Synopsis ==
A young king and a princess are engaged to be married but have never met. Both are reluctant to take part in an arranged marriage but they meet in Vienna and fall in love.

== Cast ==
- Hardy Krüger as König Richard von Carpien
- Nicole Besnard as Prinzessin Gennie Brabanzini
- Paul Hörbiger as Kriminalkommissar Schröder
- Renée Saint-Cyr as Baronin Susanne Brabanzini
- Jean Wall as Premierminister Emser
- Susi Nicoletti as Gräfin Eichenfels
- Adrienne Gessner as Fürstin
- Egon von Jordan as Hofrat Rudi Haller
- Hubert von Meyerinck as Baron Philipp von und zu Weidendorf
- Rudolf Carl as Kriminalassistent Winkler
- Theodor Danegger as Chauffeur Jean
- Hans Unterkircher as Graf Eichenfels
- Ernst Waldbrunn as Kinobesitzer
- Toni von Bukovics as Frau des Küfers
- Karl Ehmann as Karl, ein Küfer
- Martin Costa as Pächter
- Theodor Grieg as Huber, Photograph
- Carlo Böhm as Sohn des Küfers
- Mimi Stelzer as Blumenfrau
- Franz Böheim as Heurigensänger
- Viktor Braun as Fiakerlenker
- Raoul Retzer as Exzellenz mit Fes

== Bibliography ==
- Fritsche, Maria. Homemade Men in Postwar Austrian Cinema: Nationhood, Genre and Masculinity. Berghahn Books, 2013.
