= Fred Bertelmann =

German singer and actor (1925–2014)

Fred Bertelmann (7 October 1925 – 22 January 2014) was a German singer and actor.

== Life ==
Bertelmann was born in Duisburg in the Ruhr area, the son of a chemical industry employee. Aged nine, he became a chorister and later also studied cello, trumpet, guitar and singing at the Nuremberg Conservatory. He also attended acting lessons at the UFA film studios.

In World War II, he fought in the Wehrmacht on one of the Western Fronts and became a US prisoner of war in 1944. He was sent to a camp in Alabama, where he first heard swing music. After his release in May 1946, he returned to Bavaria, where he founded his own band and performed in American GI clubs in Füssen and in Landsberg am Lech. From 1947 onward, he played together with conductor and composer Ernst Mosch, both appeared in Bayerischer Rundfunk radio broadcasts. In 1950, Bertelmann toured Sweden with Arne Hülphers's orchestra and Zarah Leander. His career was further promoted by the successful record producer Michael Jary and Bertelmann's performances in the first television broadcasts of Nordwestdeutscher Rundfunk (NWDR) in Hamburg from 1952. Here he met with Bibi Jones, both later recorded several duets.

Bertelmann also worked as a solo singer of numerous Schlager songs. His most popular song was "Der lachende Vagabund" ("The laughing tramp"), published by Electrola in 1957, a cover version of Jim Lowe's song "Gambler’s Guitar". The 'Wirtschaftswunder' tune sold over two million copies, and was awarded a gold disc. It was itself covered in 1986 by the Finnish actor Vesa-Matti Loiri in his role as Jean-Pierre Kusela, whose song "Naurava kulkuri" likewise had success.

Other hits included "Wenn es Nacht wird in Montana", "In Hamburg sind die Nächte lang", "Zwei Gitarren am Meer", "Ein kleines Lied auf allen Wegen", "Arrivederci Roma", "Meine Heimat ist täglich woanders", "Ti amo Marina", "Schwalbenlied", "Es wird in 100 Jahren wieder so ein Frühling sein", "Gitarren klingen leise durch die Nacht", "Es ist ein Herzenswunsch von mir", "Ich wünsch' dir eine schöne Zeit", "Die Mühlen", "Mit dir möchte ich 100 Jahre werden", and "Amore mio". During his long-lasting career up to the 1990s he published almost 100 singles, eight albums and numerous compact discs. He took part in the German national finals of the Eurovision Song Contest 1958 and 1964.

Bertelmann also played as an actor in the 1950s and 1960s, in movies as well as in classical stage plays, such as Götz von Berlichingen or The Taming of the Shrew. He enjoyed considerable success in the US, appearing in television shows of Ed Sullivan, Dean Martin and Perry Como, and performed in a 1961 musical theatre production of Show Boat in Chicago. In Europe he performed together with stars including Marika Rökk Vico Torriani, Hans-Joachim Kulenkampff, and Caterina Valente. In 1972 he founded a show business school in Munich together with Gitta Lind.

In 1966, he married television presenter and actress Ruth Kappelsberger. Bertelmann made his last appearances at the Munich Opera Festival in 2005 and 2006. In late 2013, he suffered from severe pneumonia. He died on 22 January 2014 in Berg in Bavaria, at the age of 88.

== Songs ==
- "Tina Marie", 1955, Electrola, 5.
- "Meine kleine süße Susi", 1956, Electrola, 3.
- "Marie mit dem frechen Blick", 1957, Electrola, 15.
- "Bene bene tanto", 1957, Electrola, 13.
- "Der lachende Vagabund", 1958, Electrola, 1.
- "Ich bin ja nur ein Troubadur", 1958, Electrola, 6.
- "Aber du heißt Pia", 1958, Electrola, 7.
- "Ihr zartes Lächeln", 1959, Electrola, 6.
- "Der Dumme im Leben ist immer der Mann" (duet with Chris Howland), 1959, Electrola
- "Tiamo Marina", 1960, Electrola, 30.
- "Einmal High High High", 1960, Electrola, 34.
- "Mary-Rose", 1962, Polydor, 36.
- "Ein Caballero", 1963, Polydor, 39.
- "Es gibt immer einen Weg", 1967, Ariola

== Filmography ==
- 1956: Pulverschnee nach Übersee
- 1957: Wenn Frauen schwindeln
- 1957: Europas neue Musikparade
- 1958: Der lachende Vagabund
- 1959: Guitars Sound Softly Through the Night
- 1959: Arena of Fear
- 1959: Wenn das mein großer Bruder wüßte
- 1959: The Blue Sea and You
- 1960: My Niece Doesn't Do That
- 1960: Gauner-Serenade
- 1961: So liebt und küßt man in Tirol
- 1962: Lieder klingen am Lago Maggiore
- 1966: Laß die Finger von der Puppe
- 1975: Ein Walzer zu zweien (TV)
- 1996: Zum Stanglwirt – episode: "Jetzt scha mer mal – Dann seh’ mer scho" (TV series)

== Awards ==
- Order of Merit of the Federal Republic of Germany
