= An Alibi for Death =

1963 film

- Directed by: Alfred Vohrer
- Written by: Stefan Gommermann; Werner P. Zibaso; Herbert Reinecker
- Produced by: Herbert Gruber; Karl Schwetter
- Starring: Ruth Leuwerik; Peter van Eyck; Charles Regnier
- Cinematography: Friedl Behn-Grund
- Edited by: Arnfried Heyne
- Music by: Peter Thomas
- Production company: Sascha Film
- Distributed by: Gloria Film
- Release date: 29 November 1963
- Running time: 97 minutes
- Countries: Austria; West Germany
- Language: German

An Alibi for Death (German: Ein Alibi zerbricht) is a 1963 Austrian-German crime drama film directed by Alfred Vohrer and starring Ruth Leuwerik, Peter van Eyck and Charles Regnier.

It was shot at the Rosenhügel Studios in Vienna with sets designed by the art director Fritz Jüptner-Jonstorff.

== Cast ==
- Ruth Leuwerik as Dr. Maria Rohn
- Peter van Eyck as Günther Rohn
- Charles Regnier as Dr. Hartleben
- Sieghardt Rupp as Leopold Wasneck
- Hannelore Elsner as Hanne Wasneck
- Dieter Klein as Ulrich Holletz
- Michael Janisch as Martin Siebeck
- Fritz Schmiedel as Kommissar Seifert
- Elisabeth Stiepl as Frau Siebeck
- Klaus Münster as Robert Vierhage
- Guido Wieland as Portier
- Mario Kranz as Regenbaum
- Walter Regelsberger as criminal-Assistant Peters
- Herbert Kersten as coroner
- Elisabeth Epp as Anna

== Bibliography ==
- Davidson, John & Hake, Sabine. Framing the Fifties: Cinema in a Divided Germany. Berghahn Books, 2007.
