= Man in the Shadows =

1961 film directed by Arthur Maria Rabenalt

- Directed by: Arthur Maria Rabenalt
- Written by: Wolfgang Menge
- Produced by: Alfred Lehr
- Starring: Helmut Qualtinger; Ellen Schwiers; Barbara Frey
- Cinematography: Elio Carniel; Michael Epp
- Edited by: Hermine Diethelm; Margarethe Novotny
- Music by: Friedrich Gulda
- Production company: Österreichische Film
- Distributed by: Sascha Film; UFA Film Hansa
- Release date: 18 August 1961
- Running time: 95 minutes
- Country: Austria
- Language: German

Man in the Shadows (German: Mann im Schatten) is a 1961 Austrian crime film directed by Arthur Maria Rabenalt and starring Helmut Qualtinger, Ellen Schwiers and Barbara Frey. It was shot at the Rosenhügel Studios in Vienna and on location in the city. The film's sets were designed by the art director Fritz Moegle. It was distributed in West German market, important for Austrian films, by UFA.

== Cast ==
- Helmut Qualtinger as Dr. Radosch, Oberpolizeirat
- Ellen Schwiers as Miriam Capell
- Barbara Frey as Barabara Jäger
- Katharina Mayberg as Vera Valentin
- Helmuth Lohner as Franz Villinger
- Fritz Tillmann as Born, Kriminalrat
- Peter Neusser as Vondracek, Kriminalrevierinsp.
- Erik Frey as Prof. Höfner
- Gerd Frickhöffer as Dr. Melchers
- Robert Lindner as Josef Kaschubek
- Wolf Neuber as Maitner
- Hans Thimig as Dr. Stallinger, Professor
- Raoul Retzer as Weber
- Herbert Fux as Hofleitner
- Felix Czerny as Lukasch
- Willi Hufnagel as Hauswart
- Ossy Kolmann as Stanzl

== Bibliography ==
- Fritz, Walter. Geschichte des österreichischen Films: Aus Anlass des Jubiläums 75 Jahre Film. Bergland-Verlag, 1969.
- Von Dassanowsky, Robert. Austrian Cinema: A History. McFarland, 2005.
