= Herbert Gruber (producer) =

Austrian film producer (1913–1999)

- Born: 17 February 1913; Vienna, Austro-Hungarian Empire
- Died: 28 January 1999 (aged 85); Vienna, Austria
- Occupation: Producer
- Years active: 1954–1965 (film)

Herbert Gruber (1913 in Vienna – 1999 in Vienna) was an Austrian film producer.

After gaineing a doctorate in law from the University of Vienna he worked as a lawyer for some years. Following the Second World War he began working for Austria's biggest film company Sascha Film, and in the mid-1950s he became head of production. Gruber held the position for around a decade, overseeing in particular a number of popular comedies starring Peter Alexander.

== Selected filmography ==
- Bruder Martin (1954)
- Dunja (1955)
- Marriage Sanitarium (1955)
- Crown Prince Rudolph's Last Love (1956)
- Kaiserjäger (1956)
- The Unexcused Hour (1957)
- The Saint and Her Fool (1957)
- Vienna, City of My Dreams (1957)
- The Priest and the Girl (1958)
- One Should Be Twenty Again (1958)
- Arena of Fear (1959)
- Twelve Girls and One Man (1959)
- Mikosch of the Secret Service (1959)
- Crime Tango (1960)
- The White Horse Inn (1960)
- Guitars Sound Softly Through the Night (1960)
- Mariandl (1961)
- Season in Salzburg (1961)
- The Adventures of Count Bobby (1961)
- Die Fledermaus (1962)
- Wedding Night in Paradise (1962)
- The Sweet Life of Count Bobby (1962)
- Waldrausch (1962)
- The Merry Widow (1962)
- Mariandl's Homecoming (1962)
- An Alibi for Death (1963)
- The Model Boy (1963)
- Charley's Aunt (1963)
- Schweik's Awkward Years (1964)
- Help, My Bride Steals (1964)
- In Bed by Eight (1965)
- Heidi (1965)

== Bibliography ==
- Franz Antel & Christian F. Winkler. Hollywood an der Donau: Geschichte der Wien-Film in Sievering. Verlag d. Österr. Staatsdr., 1991.
