= Karl Schwetter =

Austrian film actor and producer (1914–2002)

- Born: 18 January 1914; Vienna, Austro-Hungarian Empire
- Died: 26 April 2002 (aged 88); Vienna, Austria
- Occupations: Actor, Producer
- Years active: 1948-2001 (film & TV)

Karl Schwetter (1914–2002) was an Austrian film actor and producer.

== Selected filmography ==
- Vagabonds (1949)
- Adventure in Vienna (1952)
- Grandstand for General Staff (1953)
- Crown Prince Rudolph's Last Love (1955)
- The Saint and Her Fool (1957)
- The Priest and the Girl (1958)
- My Niece Doesn't Do That (1960)
- Wedding Night in Paradise (1962)
- The Sweet Life of Count Bobby (1962)
- An Alibi for Death (1963)
- The Model Boy (1963)
- Schweik's Awkward Years (1964)
- In Bed by Eight (1965)
- Heidi (1965)
- Count Bobby, The Terror of The Wild West (1966)

== Bibliography ==
- John Willis. Screen World: 1969, Volume 20. Biblo & Tannen Publishers, 1969.
