= Fritz Eckhardt =

Austrian actor

Fritz Eckhardt as chief inspector Marek in the television series Tatort

Fritz Eckhardt (born Linz, 30 November 1907; died Klosterneuburg, 31 December 1995) was an Austrian actor, director, and writer. He is remembered for playing the lead role as chief inspector Marek in the Österreichischer Rundfunk version of the detective series Tatort. He also played cabaret and wrote numerous theatre plays and film scripts.

== Partial filmography ==
- The Last Enemy (1938)
- Singende Engel (1947) - Bürgermeister von Liechtenthal (uncredited)
- Hin und her (1948) - Präsident von Bagatello
- The Angel with the Trumpet (1948)
- Nothing But Coincidence (1949)
- Der Schuß durchs Fenster (1950)
- Die Mitternachtsvenus (1951)
- Der Fünfminutenvater (1951) - Der Wirt
- Adventure in Vienna (1952) - Portier im Goldenen Löwen
- Abenteuer im Schloss (1952)
- Starfish (1952) - Weber
- Heute nacht passiert's (1953) - Studienrat Krickau
- Ich und meine Frau (1953)
- Ein tolles Früchtchen (1953) - Department store boss
- The Last Bridge (1954) - Tilleke
- Bruder Martin (1954) - Herr Malzl
- Marriage Sanitarium (1955) - Herr Rübsam
- His Daughter is Called Peter (1955) - Gendarmeriebeamter
- Sarajevo (1955) - Prof. Weissbacher
- Pulverschnee nach Übersee (1956) - Mister Frank Jones
- A Woman Who Knows What She Wants (1958) - Arpad Kelemen - Direktor 'Apollo'-Theater
- Solang' die Sterne glüh'n (1958) - Otto Runkelmann, Großmolkereibesitzer
- So ein Millionär hat's schwer (1958) - Wirt Napoleon
- Labyrinth (1959) - Khan
- Die schöne Lügnerin (1959) - (uncredited)
- The Man Who Walked Through the Wall (1959) - Gefängnisdirektor
- Adorable Arabella (1959) - Hill, Bierbrauer
- The Good Soldier Schweik (1960) - Robert Wendler
- Mal drunter – mal drüber (1960) - Direktor Hummel
- Almost Angels (1962) - Father Fiala
- Miracle of the White Stallions (1963)
- Charley's Aunt (1963) - August Sallmann
- Walt Disney's Wonderful World of Color : The Waltz King (1963, TV Series) - Haslinger
- DM-Killer (1965) - Mr. Colloway
- Kurzer Prozess (1967) - Raimond Höfler
- The Reverend Turns a Blind Eye (1971) - Bischof
- Trouble with Trixie (1972) - Wiesinger sen.
- Der selige Herr aus dem Parlament (1976) - Bach
- Tafelspitz (1994) - Chef der Kochschule (final film role)

== Decorations and awards ==
- 1989: Ring of Honour of the City of Vienna
- 1983: Austrian Cross of Honour for Science and Art, 1st class
- 1973: Gold Medal of the city of Vienna
- 1974: Golden Camera
