= Count Bobby, The Terror of The Wild West =

- Directed by: Paul Martin
- Written by: Robert Oxford; Kurt Nachmann
- Produced by: Mihajlo Rasic; Karl Schwetter
- Starring: Peter Alexander; Olga Schoberová; Gunther Philipp
- Cinematography: Sepp Ketterer
- Edited by: Arnfried Heyne
- Music by: Heinz Gietz
- Production companies: Sascha Film; Avala Film
- Distributed by: Omnia Deutsche Film
- Release date: 5 January 1966
- Running time: 92 minutes
- Countries: Austria; Yugoslavia
- Language: German

Count Bobby, The Terror of The Wild West (German: Graf Bobby, der Schrecken des wilden Westens) is a 1966 Austrian musical comedy film directed by Paul Martin and starring Peter Alexander, Olga Schoberová and Gunther Philipp. It was the last in a trilogy of films featuring the character Count Bobby. It drew some inspiration from the ongoing series of Karl May film adaptations set in the Wild West.

The film's sets were designed by the art director Fritz Jüptner-Jonstorff. It was shot at studios in Belgrade, and on location around Yugoslavia which stood in for the American west as it frequently did in German films of the decade.

== Synopsis ==
An impoverished Viennese aristocrat inherits an estate in Arizona and travels out hoping that it is a lucrative gold mine.

== Cast ==
- Peter Alexander as Graf Bobby von Pichulsky
- Olga Schoberová as Milli Miller
- Gunther Philipp as Baron Mucki von Kalk
- Hanne Wieder as Jezabel
- Elisabeth Markus as Tante Sophie
- Vladimir Medar as Doc Ted W. Harper
- Dragomir Felba as Sheriff Martin Miller
- Rastko Tadic
- Zivojin Denic as Pedro Gonzalez
- Jovan Janicijevic-Burdus as Kiddy
- Milivoje Popovic-Mavid as Buggy

== Bibliography ==
- Robert von Dassanowsky. Austrian Cinema: A History. McFarland, 2005.
