= In Bed by Eight =

1965 film

- Directed by: Werner Jacobs
- Written by: Janne Furch; Eckart Hachfeld
- Produced by: Herbert Gruber; Karl Schwetter
- Starring: Peter Alexander; Gitte Hænning; Ingeborg Schöner; Gunther Philipp
- Cinematography: Sepp Ketterer
- Edited by: Arnfried Heyne
- Music by: Johannes Fehring; Heinz Gietz; Gerhard Winkler
- Production companies: Sascha Film; Schlaraffia Filmgesellschaft
- Distributed by: Constantin Film
- Release date: 15 January 1965
- Running time: 97 minutes
- Country: West Germany
- Language: German

In Bed by Eight (German: ...und sowas muß um acht ins Bett) is a 1965 Austrian-West German black-and-white musical comedy film directed by Werner Jacobs and starring Peter Alexander, Gitte Hænning and Ingeborg Schöner. It was shot at the Rosenhügel Studios in Vienna. The film's sets were designed by the art director Fritz Jüptner-Jonstorff.

== Synopsis ==
A teacher at a boarding school in the Carinthian mountains has to deal with an extremely difficult class. Led by the troublesome Princess Margaret they write fake love letters from him to his female colleague, eventually launching a romance between them.

== Cast ==
- Peter Alexander as Dr. Eduard Frank
- Gitte Hænning as Prinzessin Margaret
- Ingeborg Schöner as Angelika Weiß
- Gunther Philipp as Dr. Arthur Schäfer
- Loni Heuser as Frau Dr. Diehlmann
- Lotte Lang as Frau Dr. Schwabe
- Peter Gerhard as Direktor Rieger
- Helli Servi as Fräulein Bichler
- Elisabeth Stiepl as Fräulein Hampel
- Gisela Hahn as Ines
- Rudolf Vogel as Hofrat Andersen

== Bibliography ==
- Von Dassanowsky, Robert. Austrian Cinema: A History. McFarland, 2005.
