= The Model Boy =

1963 Austrian film by Werner Jacobs

- Directed by: Werner Jacobs
- Written by: Janne Furch
- Produced by: Herbert Gruber; Karl Schwetter
- Starring: Peter Alexander; Cornelia Froboess; Gunther Philipp
- Cinematography: Sepp Ketterer; Rudolf Sandtner
- Edited by: Arnfried Heyne
- Music by: Johannes Fehring
- Production company: Sascha Film
- Distributed by: Constantin Film
- Release date: 17 May 1963
- Running time: 93 minutes
- Country: Austria
- Language: German

The Model Boy (German: Der Musterknabe) is a 1963 Austrian comedy film directed by Werner Jacobs and starring Peter Alexander, Cornelia Froboess and Gunther Philipp.

The film was shot at the Rosenhügel Studios in Vienna. The film's sets were designed by the art directors Fritz Jüptner-Jonstorff and Alexander Sawczynski.

== Plot ==
A doctor disguises himself as his brother and attends school in his place to help him pass his high school final exam. While there, he falls in love with a female student.

== Cast ==
- Peter Alexander as Doctor Fritz Geyer
- Cornelia Froboess as Renate Pacher
- Theo Lingen as Prof. Dr. Liebreich
- Gunther Philipp as Doctor Erwin Berthold
- Gusti Wolf as Miss Puppernick, secretary
- Wolfgang Jansen as Benno Geyer
- Rudolf Carl as Erich Pacher
- Elisabeth Epp as Mathilde Pacher
- Adrienne Gessner as Elisabeth Geyer
- Joseph Egger as porter
- Franz Stoß as Professor Kramm
- Otto Loewe as Doctor Oberwasser

== Bibliography ==
- Von Dassanowsky, Robert. Austrian Cinema: A History. McFarland, 2005.
