= Egon von Jordan =

Austrian actor

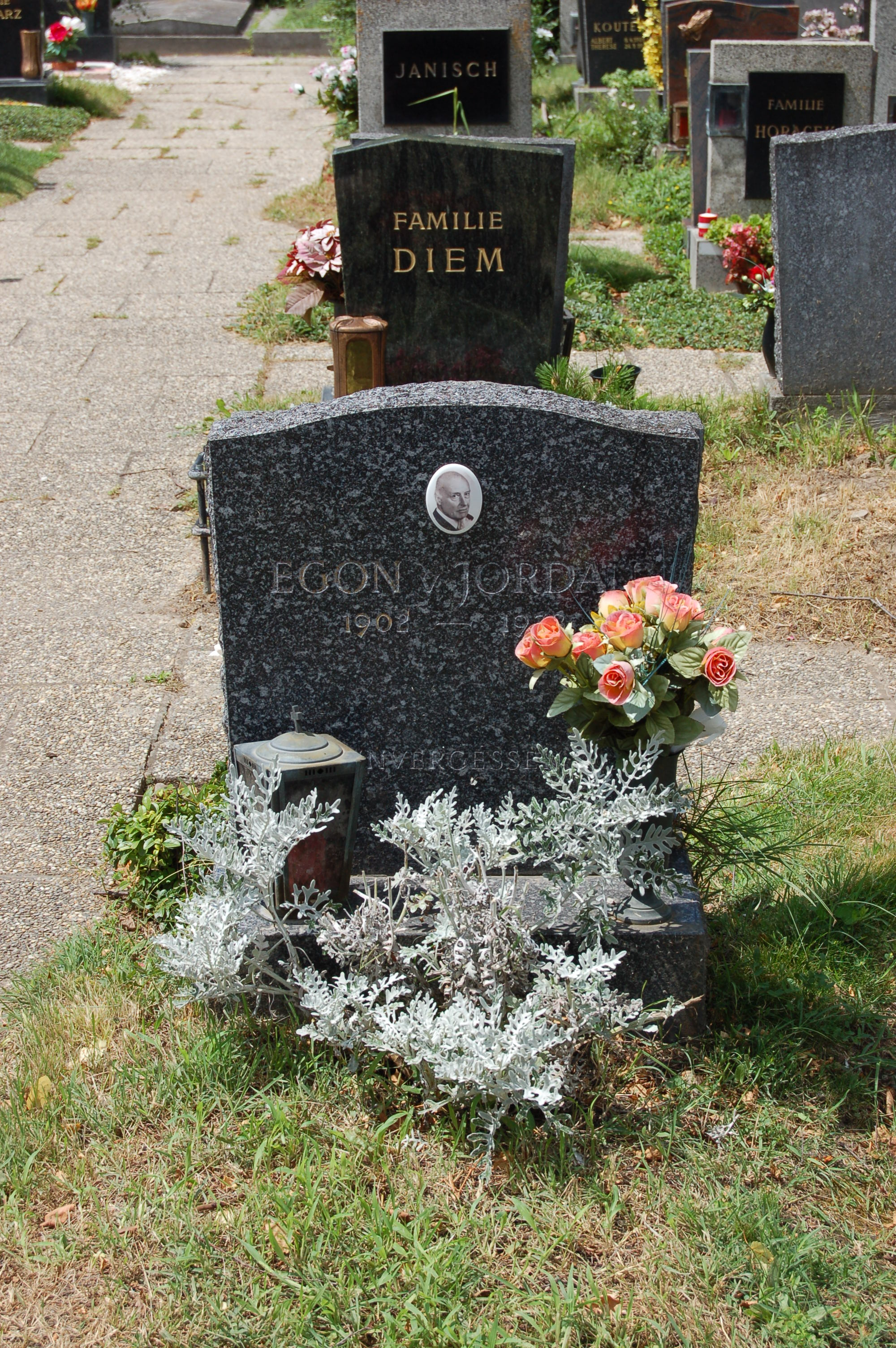
- Grave of Egon von Jordan, Stammersdorfer Zentralfriedhof, Stammersdorf
- Born: 19 March 1902; Dux, Bohemia, Austria-Hungary (now Duchcov, Czech Republic)
- Died: 27 December 1978 (aged 76); Vienna, Austria
- Occupation: Actor
- Years active: 1923-1974

Egon von Jordan (19 March 1902 – 27 December 1978) was an Austrian film actor. He appeared in more than 80 films between 1923 and 1974.

== Selected filmography ==
- The Ghost of Morton's Castle (1922)
- Young Medardus (1923)
- Lace (1926)
- Vienna - Berlin (1926)
- One Does Not Play with Love (1926)
- When the Young Wine Blossoms (1927)
- Poor Little Colombine (1927)
- Autumn on the Rhine (1928)
- The Market of Life (1928)
- Girls, Beware! (1928)
- Queen Louise (1928)
- Helene Willfüer, Student of Chemistry (1930)
- Men Behind Bars (1931)
- The Murder Trial of Mary Dugan (1931)
- Our Emperor (1933)
- A Star Fell from Heaven (1934)
- Such Great Foolishness (1937)
- Vienna Tales (1940)
- My Daughter Lives in Vienna (1940)
- Vienna Blood (1942)
- Gabriele Dambrone (1943)
- Music in Salzburg (1944)
- Viennese Girls (1945)
- Shame on You, Brigitte! (1952)
- Adventure in Vienna (1952)
- Stolen Identity (1953)
- A Night in Venice (1953)
- Once I Will Return (1953)
- If I Only Have Your Love (1953)
- Bel Ami (1955)
- The Blue Danube (1955)
- Mozart (1955)
- The Doctor's Secret (1955)
- Scandal in Bad Ischl (1957)
- Sebastian Kneipp (1958)
- Town Without Pity (1961)
- Romance in Venice (1962)
- Leutnant Gustl (1963, TV film)
