= Sepp Ketterer =

Sepp Ketterer (11 February 1899 in Altglashütten – 11 January 1991) was a German-born Austrian cinematographer. He was involved in the cinematography of almost 50 films between 1938 and 1968.

He worked on a number of Austrian films such as 1. April 2000 which was released in 1952.

== Selected filmography ==
- The White Dream (1943)
- The Fourth Commandment (1950)
- Hannerl (1952)
- Grandstand for General Staff (1953)
- On the Green Meadow (1953)
- Goetz von Berlichingen (1955)
- The Blue Danube (1955)
- The King of Bernina (1957)
- Twelve Girls and One Man (1959)
- Crime Tango (1960)
- Bombs on Monte Carlo (1960)
- The Adventures of Count Bobby (1961)
- Three Men in a Boat (1961)
- The Model Boy (1963)
- In Bed by Eight (1965)
- Count Bobby, The Terror of The Wild West (1966)
