= Arnfried Heyne =

German film editor

- Born: 29 December 1905; Dresden, German Empire
- Died: 12 January 1978 (aged 72); Vienna, Austria
- Occupation: Editor
- Years active: 1932-1972

Arnfried Heyne (29 December 1905 – 12 January 1978) was a German film editor, who also worked as assistant director. He was one of several editors to work on Leni Riefenstahl's Olympia (1938).

== Selected filmography ==
- How Shall I Tell My Husband? (1932)
- Donogoo Tonka (1936)
- Donogoo (1936)
- The Broken Jug (1937)
- Bachelor's Paradise (1939)
- Thrice Wed (1941)
- Destiny (1942)
- Vienna Blood (1942)
- Vienna 1910 (1943)
- The White Dream (1943)
- The Immortal Face (1947)
- The Singing House (1948)
- The Heavenly Waltz (1948)
- Gateway to Peace (1951)
- The Mine Foreman (1952)
- Hello Porter (1952)
- The Emperor Waltz (1953)
- Marriage Sanitarium (1955)
- Espionage (1955)
- The Congress Dances (1955)
- Emperor's Ball (1956)
- One Should Be Twenty Again (1958)
- Love, Girls and Soldiers (1958)
- Arena of Fear (1959)
- Rendezvous in Vienna (1959)
- As the Sea Rages (1959)
- Crime Tango (1960)
- The White Horse Inn (1960)
- Mariandl (1961)
- The Adventures of Count Bobby (1961)
- The Sweet Life of Count Bobby (1962)
- The Merry Widow (1962)
- Wedding Night in Paradise (1962)
- An Alibi for Death (1963)
- The Model Boy (1963)
- Our Crazy Nieces (1963)
- Help, My Bride Steals (1964)
- The Great Skate (1964)
- Schweik's Awkward Years (1964)
- Tim Frazer and the Mysterious Mister X (1964)
- In Bed by Eight (1965)
- Count Bobby, The Terror of The Wild West (1966)
- Help, I Love Twins (1969)
- My Father, the Ape and I (1971)
- The Merry Quartet from the Filling Station (1972)

== Bibliography ==
- Rother, Rainer. Leni Riefenstahl: The Seduction of Genius. Bloomsbury Publishing, 2003.
