= Fritz Jüptner-Jonstorff =

Austrian art director (1908–1993)

- Born: 2 June 1908; Vienna, Austro-Hungarian Empire
- Died: 24 October 1993 (aged 85); Klosterneuburg, Austria
- Other name: Friedrich Joachim Freiherr Jüptner von Jonstorff
- Occupation: Art director
- Years active: 1936 - 1973 (film)

Fritz Jüptner-Jonstorff (1908–1993) was an Austrian art director who worked on more than a hundred films during his career. Jüptner-Jonstorff was one of the leading figures in his field in Europe, designing sets for films such as Victoria in Dover (1954) and Sissi (1955).

== Selected filmography ==
- The Heart Must Be Silent (1944)
- The Immortal Face (1947)
- Anni (1948)
- Fregola (1948)
- Ulli and Marei (1948)
- Queen of the Landstrasse (1948)
- The Heavenly Waltz (1948)
- Mountain Crystal (1949)
- Lambert Feels Threatened (1949)
- Theodore the Goalkeeper (1950)
- A Tale of Five Cities (1951)
- Call Over the Air (1951)
- Gateway to Peace (1951)
- Adventure in Vienna (1952)
- Knall and Fall as Imposters (1952)
- Hannerl (1952)
- On the Green Meadow (1953)
- Anna Louise and Anton (1953)
- Grandstand for General Staff (1953)
- To Be Without Worries (1953)
- Victoria in Dover (1954)
- Sissi (1955)
- Marriage Sanitarium (1955)
- The Doctor's Secret (1955)
- The Blue Danube (1955)
- The Dairymaid of St. Kathrein (1955)
- Opera Ball (1956)
- One Should Be Twenty Again (1958)
- Twelve Girls and One Man (1959)
- Guitars Sound Softly Through the Night (1960)
- Crime Tango (1960)
- The Adventures of Count Bobby (1961)
- The Sweet Life of Count Bobby (1962)
- Wedding Night in Paradise (1962)
- An Alibi for Death (1963)
- The Model Boy (1963)
- Schweik's Awkward Years (1964)
- In Bed by Eight (1965)

== Bibliography ==
- Robert Dassanowsky. Austrian Cinema: A History. McFarland, 2005.
