= Fritz Muliar =

Austrian actor

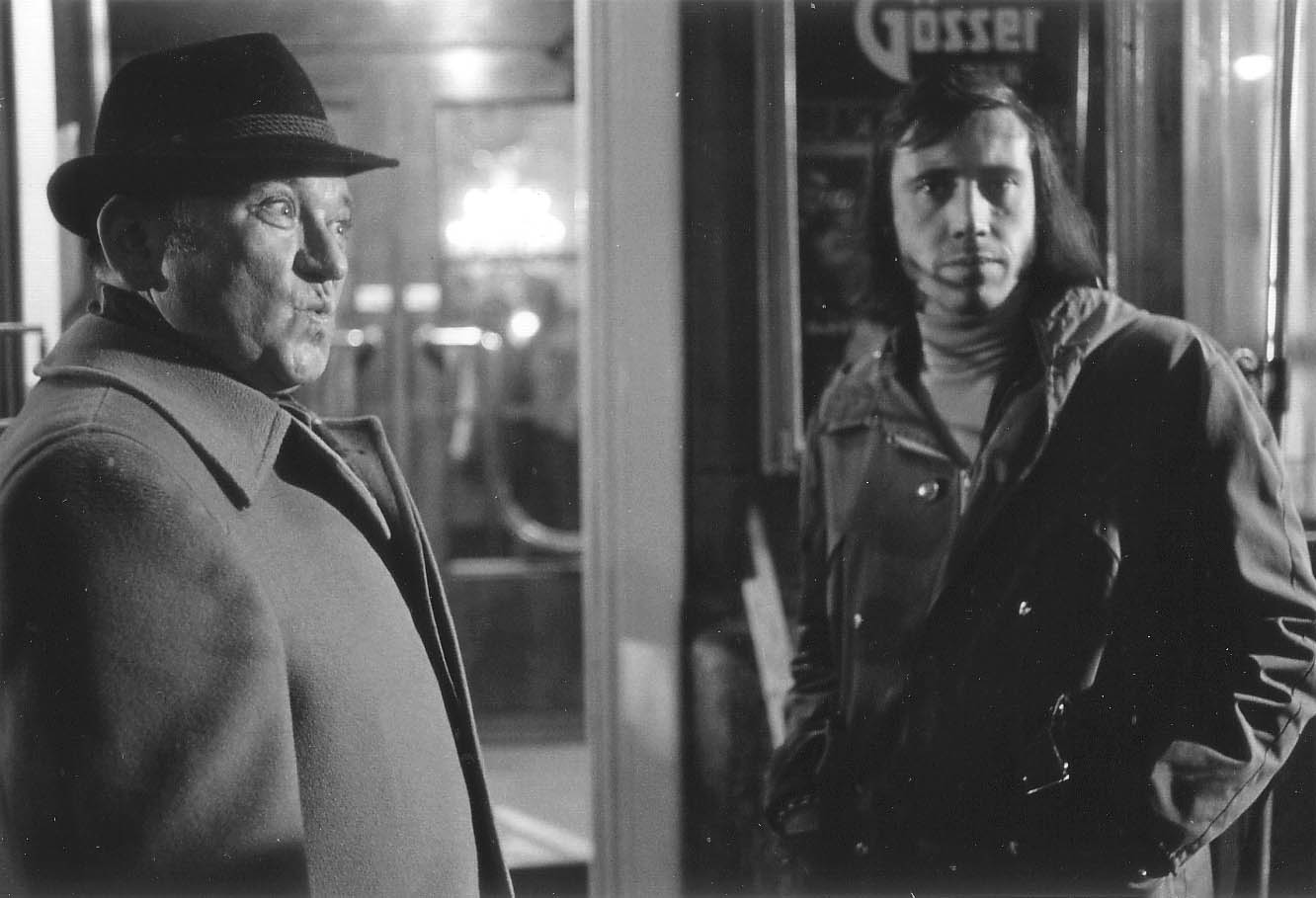
- Fritz Muliar (left)
- Born: Friedrich Ludwig Stand; December 12, 1919; Vienna, Austria
- Died: May 4, 2009 (aged 89); Vienna, Austria
- Occupation: Actor

Fritz Muliar, born as Friedrich Ludwig Stand (December 12, 1919 – May 4, 2009), was an Austrian actor who, due to his huge popularity, is often referred to by his countrymen as Volksschauspieler.

== Biography ==
Born in Neubau, Vienna as the stepson of a jeweller, Muliar became a cabaret artist in the late 1930s. He was a Boy Scout in his youth. After serving in the Second World War, he was imprisoned by the Nazis in 1942 and spent seven months in solitary confinement for Betätigung zur Wiederherstellung eines freien Österreich (activities to restore Austrian independence—see Anschluss).

After the war, Muliar started his career as a stage actor. Of small build, he once said that his ambitions had never included playing parts such as that of Othello. Rather, he had always preferred comic roles and traditional Austrian fare (Johann Nestroy, Ferdinand Raimund). Muliar also excelled in imitating various accents, in particular those used by Czech and Yiddish speakers of German. In 1990, he had enormous success in Felix Mitterer's play for one person, Siberia (televised in 1991), a study in ageism about an old man who has been abandoned by his family in a retirement home and his struggle for dignity.

While he also performed regularly at the Salzburg Festival in the play Jedermann (a version of Everyman), Muliar was associated with two Viennese theatres in particular: the Burgtheater (whose tenured member he was until his retirement), and the Theater in der Josefstadt, where he worked until his death in 2009. He was one of the severest critics of Claus Peymann (born 1937), director of the Burgtheater between 1986 and 1999 whose leadership polarized Austrian theatregoers by its focus on controversial playwrights such as Thomas Bernhard and Elfriede Jelinek. Musical theatre saw Muliar in the non-singing role of Frosch in Die Fledermaus. At Theater in der Josefstadt, Muliar was perhaps best known for the role of Mr. Green in Jeff Baron's Visiting Mr. Green (Besuch bei Mr Green). Muliar, Michael Dangl the theater and Jeff Baron were awarded the 2001 Kulturpreis Europa for this production, which ran for several seasons and was nationally telecast.

Muliar appeared in numerous films and in some television series such as Kir Royal (alongside Franz Xaver Kroetz) and Kommissar Rex. He is best remembered beyond the boundaries of his native Vienna for playing the title role in the 13-part TV series, Die Abenteuer des braven Soldaten Schwejk, which was filmed in German and broadcast by the Austrian state TV (ORF) in 1972.

Muliar was a committed Social Democrat who publicly supported various Austrian Social Democratic politicians during their election campaigns. He was married from 1955 to Franziska Kalmar, Austria's first television presenter. In January 2006 he was elected to the position of a public advisor in the Austrian state TV (ORF). He died in Vienna, aged 89.

== Awards ==
- Decoration for Services to the Liberation of Austria
- Gold Medal for services to the City of Vienna
- Medal of the Austrian Broadcasting Corporation
- Professor by the Republic of Austria (1975)
- Merit Cross 1st Class of the Order of Merit of the Federal Republic of Germany (1977)
- Kainz Medal for Peachum in Bertolt Brecht's Three Penny Opera (1978)
- Nestroy Ring (1984)
- Austrian Cross of Honour for Science and Art, 1st class (1984)
- Gold Medal of Styria (1985)
- Kammerschauspieler ("Chamber actor") (1985)
- Gold Medal of Salzburg (1989)
- Naming of a street in Grossenzersdorf after Fritz Muliar in 1994
- Honorary member of the Burgtheater (1995)
- Honorary member of the Theater in der Josefstadt (1996)
- Ring of Honour of the City of Vienna (1999)
- European Culture Prize (2001)
- Grand Decoration of Honour in Silver for Services to the Republic of Austria (2002)
- Grand Golden Decoration for services to the province of Lower Austria (2002)
- Platinum Romy for lifetime achievement (2004)
- Ferdinand Raimund-Ring 2008
- Ring of honour of Grossenzersdorf
