= Sievering Studios =

Film studios located in Vienna

Sievering Studios were film production studios located in Sievering, a suburb of the Austrian capital Vienna.

The studios were established in 1916 by the film pioneer Alexander Kolowrat for use by his Sascha-Film. After the First World War they functioned as the largest film studios of the new Austrian Republic and a number of major productions were made there during a boom period for the country's film industry during the silent era of the 1920s. Directors such as Michael Curtiz and Alexander Korda worked there during the decade.

Following the Anschluss of 1938, Sievering was incorporated as part of the new company Wien Film by the Nazi authorities. After the Second World War it was located in the American Sector of Occupied Vienna. Control of the property of the former Wien Film, including the Sievering Studios, were placed under the control of director Karl Hartl.

In 1949 the studio facilities were used for the production of the British film The Third Man by Carol Reed. The building housing the studios was demolished during the 1970s following the sharp decline in Austrian film production.

== Bibliography ==
- Drazin, Charles. Korda: Britain's Movie Mogul. I.B.Tauris, 2011.
- Fritsche, Maria. Homemade Men in Postwar Austrian Cinema: Nationhood, Genre and Masculinity. Berghahn Books, 2013.
- Von Dassanowsky, Robert. Austrian Cinema: A History. McFarland, 2005.
