= List of Austrian films of the 1950s =

This is a list of films produced in the cinema of Austria in the 1950s ordered by year of release. For an alphabetical list of articles on Austrian films see Category:Austrian films.

== 1950 ==
Title	Director	Cast	Genre	Notes
Archduke Johann's Great Love	Hans Schott-Schöbinger	Marte Harell, O. W. Fischer	Romance	
Bonus on Death	Curd Jürgens	Judith Holzmeister, Werner Krauss	Crime	
Cordula	Gustav Ucicky	Paula Wessely, Attila Hörbiger	Drama	
The Fourth Commandment	Eduard von Borsody	Attila Hörbiger, Dagny Servaes, Inge Egger	Drama	
Kissing Is No Sin	Hubert Marischka	Elfie Mayerhofer, Curd Jürgens	Comedy	Schönbrunn-Film
No Sin on the Alpine Pastures	Franz Antel	Maria Andergast, Inge Egger, Rudolf Carl	Comedy	
Der Schuß durchs Fenster (The Shot Through the Window)	Siegfried Breuer	Curd Jürgens, Siegfried Breuer		Alpin-Film-Austria

== 1951 ==
Title	Director	Cast	Genre	Notes
Call Over the Air	Georg C. Klaren, G. W. Pabst	Oskar Werner	Drama	Pabst-Kiba-Produktion
Child of the Danube	Georg Jacoby	Marika Rökk	Musical comedy	Soviet occupation zone Nova-Film / Wien-Film
City Park	Hubert Marischka	Annie Rosar, Erik Frey	Comedy drama	
Dance Into Happiness	Alfred Stöger	Johannes Heesters, Lucie Englisch, Waltraut Haas	Musical	
A Devil of a Woman	Wolfgang Liebeneiner	Hilde Krahl		Entered into the 1952 Cannes Film Festival
The Fall of Valentin	Paul Löwinger	Sepp Rist, Rudolf Carl, Joseph Egger	Comedy	
Gateway to Peace	Wolfgang Liebeneiner	Paul Hartmann, Vilma Degischer, Hilde Krahl	Drama	
Maria Theresa	Emil-Edwin Reinert	Paula Wessely, Fred Liewehr	Historical	
The Merry Farmer	Georg Marischka	Paul Hörbiger, Rudolf Carl	Comedy	
Night on Mont Blanc	Harald Reinl	Dagmar Rom, Dietmar Schönherr, Geraldine Katt	Adventure	Co-production with West Germany
Spring on Ice	Georg Jacoby	Eva Pawlik		Soviet occupation zone Nova-Film
Under the Red Sea	Hans Hass		Documentary	
Vienna Waltzes	Emil E. Reinert	Marte Harell, Anton Walbrook	Historical	
Wedding in the Hay	Arthur Maria Rabenalt	Oskar Sima, Inge Egger, Kurt Seifert	Comedy	Co-production with West Germany

== 1952 ==
Title	Director	Cast	Genre	Notes
1. April 2000	Wolfgang Liebeneiner	Hilde Krahl, Josef Meinrad, Waltraut Haas, Curd Jürgens, Paul Hörbiger, Hans Moser	Sci-fi	
Adventure in Vienna	Emil E. Reinert	Gustav Fröhlich, Cornell Borchers, Adrienne Gessner	Thriller	
Hannerl	Ernst Marischka	Johanna Matz, Adrian Hoven, Paul Hörbiger	Comedy	
Hello Porter	Franz Antel	Hans Moser, Paul Hörbiger, Maria Andergast	Comedy	
Ideal Woman Sought	Franz Antel	Inge Egger, Jeanette Schultze, Waltraut Haas	Comedy	
Knall and Fall as Imposters	Ulrich Bettac, Hubert Marischka	Hans Richter, Rudolf Carl, Curd Jürgens	Comedy	Co-production with West Germany
The Landlady of Maria Wörth	Eduard von Borsody	Maria Andergast, Mady Rahl, Rudolf Carl	Comedy	
The Mine Foreman	Franz Antel	Hans Holt, Josefin Kipper, Wolf Albach-Retty	Musical	
Season in Salzburg	Ernst Marischka	Johanna Matz, Adrian Hoven, Walter Müller	Musical opera	Wien-Film
Shame on You, Brigitte!	E.W. Emo	Heinz Rühmann, Hans Moser, Theo Lingen	Comedy	
Starfish	J.A. Hübler-Kahla	Eva Kerbler, Rudolf Carl, Edith Klinger	Musical	
Vanished Melody	Eduard von Borsody	Elfie Mayerhofer, Robert Lindner, Evelyn Künneke	Musical	
Voices of Spring	Hans Thimig	Paul Hörbiger, Hans Jaray, Senta Wengraf	Musical	

== 1953 ==
Title	Director	Cast	Genre	Notes
Anna Louise and Anton	Thomas Engel		Family	
Brutality (Flucht ins Schilf)	Kurt Steinwendner	Kurt Jaggberg, Ilka Windish, Gerhard Riedmann	Drama	
The Emperor Waltz	Franz Antel	Maria Holst, Rudolf Prack	Historical comedy	Neusser-Film
If I Only Have Your Love	Eduard von Borsody	Johannes Heesters, Gretl Schörg, Margit Saad	Musical	
Knall and Fall as Detectives	Hans Heinrich	Hans Richter, Rudolf Carl	Comedy	Co-production with West Germany
The Last Reserves	Alfred Lehner	Marianne Schönauer, Kurt Heintel, Eduard Köck	Historical	
A Night in Venice	Georg Wildhagen	Hans Olden, Jeanette Schultze	Musical	Soviet occupation zone
On the Green Meadow	Fritz Böttger	Hannelore Bollmann, Ida Krottendorf, Lucie Englisch	Comedy	
Your Heart Is My Homeland	Richard Häussler	Inge Egger, Erwin Strahl	Drama	Co-production with West Germany

== 1954 ==
Title	Director	Cast	Genre	Notes
The First Kiss	Erik Ode	Isa Günther, Jutta Günther, Erich Auer	Comedy	Co-production with West Germany
The Forester of the Silver Wood (Echo der Berge)	Alfons Stummer	Anita Gutwell, Rudolf Lenz		Title in West Germany: Der Förster vom Silberwald
The House on the Coast	Bosko Kosanovic	René Deltgen, Nadja Regin, Sybille Schmitz	Drama	Co-production with Yugoslavia
Kaisermanöver (Emperor's Manoeuvre)	Franz Antel	Winnie Markus, Rudolf Prack, Hans Moser	Romantic comedy	Neusser / Hope Film
Der Komödiant von Wien (The Comedian of Vienna)	Karl Paryla, Karl Stanzl	Karl Paryla, Vilma Degischer	Biography	Soviet occupation zone
The Last Bridge	Helmut Käutner	Maria Schell, Bernhard Wicki		Cosmopol / UFUS (Yugoslavia). Entered into the 1954 Cannes Film Festival.
Loving Couples	Franz Antel	Peter Pasetti, Rudolf Platte, Peter Alexander	Comedy music	
Marriage Impostor	Hans H. König	Hilde Krahl, Viktor Staal, Viktor de Kowa	Drama	
The Red Prince	Hans Schott-Schöbinger, Franz Antel	Inge Egger, Peter Pasetti, Richard Häussler	Drama	
Tiefland (Lowlands)	Leni Riefenstahl	Leni Riefenstahl	Drama	Filmed 1940–44; Riefenstahl-Film (Germany) / Plesner-Film
Victoria in Dover (Mädchenjahre einer Königin)	Ernst Marischka	Romy Schneider, Adrian Hoven	Romance	
Walking Back into the Past	Karl Hartl	Paula Wessely, Attila Hörbiger, Josef Meinrad	Drama	

== 1955 ==
Title	Director	Cast	Genre	Notes
Bel Ami	Louis Daquin	Johannes Heesters		Soviet occupation zone
The Blue Danube	Hans Schweikart	Hardy Krüger, Nicole Besnard, Paul Hörbiger	Comedy	
Die Deutschmeister	Ernst Marischka	Romy Schneider, Hans Moser	Romantic musical comedy	Erma-Film
The Doctor's Secret	August Rieger	Hilde Krahl, Ewald Balser, Erik Frey	Drama	Co-production with West Germany
Don Juan	Walter Kolm-Veltée	Cesare Danova, Josef Meinrad		Soviet occupation zone
Dunja	Josef von Báky	Eva Bartok, Karlheinz Böhm, Ivan Desny	Drama	
Espionage	Franz Antel	Ewald Balser, Barbara Rütting, Gerhard Riedmann	Spy drama	
Goetz von Berlichingen	Alfred Stöger	Ewald Balser, Auguste Pünkösdy, Raoul Aslan	Historical	
Her First Date	Axel von Ambesser	Nicole Heesters, Paul Dahlke, Adrian Hoven	Comedy	Co-production with Wes Germany
Jackboot Mutiny (Es geschah am 20. Juli)	Georg Wilhelm Pabst	Bernhard Wicki, Karl Ludwig Diehl		
The Last Ten Days (Der letzte Akt)	Georg Wilhelm Pabst	Albin Skoda, Oskar Werner	Biographical drama	Cosmopol-Film
Let the Sun Shine Again	Hubert Marischka	Hans Holt, Hertha Feiler, Cornelia Froboess	Comedy	Co-production with Germany
Das Mädchen vom Pfarrhof (The Girl from the Priest's Farm)	Alfred Lehner	Waltraut Haas, Erich Auer		Zenith-Sonor
Marriage Sanitarium	Franz Antel	Adrian Hoven, Maria Emo, Margit Saad	Comedy	
Mozart	Karl Hartl	Oskar Werner, Johanna Matz, Nadja Tiller, Albin Skoda		Entered into the 1956 Cannes Film Festival
Omaru - Eine afrikanische Liebesgeschichte (Omaru - An African Love Story)	Albert Quendler		Documentary	Wien-Film
Royal Hunt in Ischl	Hans Schott-Schöbinger	Elma Karlowa, Herta Staal, Hans von Borsody	Historical	Co-production with West Germany
Sarajevo	Fritz Kortner	Luise Ullrich, Ewald Balser, Klaus Kinski	Historical drama	
Sissi	Ernst Marischka	Romy Schneider, Karlheinz Böhm		
Spionage	Franz Antel	Ewald Balser, Barbara Rütting, Oskar Werner, Gerhard Riedmann	Historical spy drama	Neusser / Hope Film
Three Men in the Snow	Kurt Hoffmann	Paul Dahlke, Günther Lüders, Claus Biederstaedt	Comedy	

== 1956 ==
Title	Director	Cast	Genre	Notes
And Who Is Kissing Me?	Max Nosseck	Hans Moser, Grethe Weiser, Theo Lingen	Comedy	
Crown Prince Rudolph's Last Love	Rudolf Jugert	Rudolf Prack, Christiane Hörbiger, Winnie Markus	Historical	
Engagement at Wolfgangsee	Helmut Weiss	Ingrid Andree, Wolf Albach-Retty, Maria Andergast	Comedy	
Her Corporal	E.W. Emo	Peter Weck, Paul Hörbiger	Historical comedy	
Holiday am Wörthersee (Holiday on the Wörthersee)	Hans Schott-Schöbinger	Walter Müller, Wera Frydtberg		Rialto Film
Imperial and Royal Field Marshal	E.W. Emo	Rudolf Vogel, Mady Rahl	Historical comedy	
Kaiserjäger	Willi Forst	Adrian Hoven, Erika Remberg		
Love, Summer and Music	Hubert Marischka	Joe Stöckel, Dorit Kreysler	Comedy	Co-production with West Germany
Opera Ball	Ernst Marischka	Johannes Heesters, Sonja Ziemann, Adrian Hoven, Theo Lingen, Hans Moser	Musical opera	

== 1957 ==
Title	Director	Cast	Genre	Notes
Almenrausch and Edelweiss	Harald Reinl	Elma Karlowa, Karin Dor, Harald Juhnke, Theo Lingen	Comedy	Bergland Film. Co-production with Germany
The King of Bernina	Alfred Lehner	Helmuth Schneider, Waltraut Haas	Historical drama	Co-production with Switzerland
Ober Zahlen (Bill Please)	E.W. Emo	Hans Moser, Paul Hörbiger	Comedy	ÖFA
The Saint and Her Fool	Gustav Ucicky	Gerhard Riedmann, Hertha Feiler	Drama	
Scandal in Bad Ischl	Rolf Thiele	O.W. Fischer, Elisabeth Müller, Ivan Desny	Comedy	
The Schimeck Family	Georg Jacoby	Theo Lingen, Fita Benkhoff, Helga Neuner	Comedy	
Der schönste Tag meines Lebens	Max Neufeld	Michael Ande, Joseph Egger, Paul Hörbiger	Musical drama	
Sissi – Fateful Years of an Empress	Ernst Marischka	Romy Schneider, Karlheinz Böhm		Entered into the 1958 Cannes Film Festival
The Unexcused Hour	Willi Forst	Adrian Hoven, Erika Remberg, Hans Moser	Comedy	Co-production with West Germany
Vienna, City of My Dreams	Willi Forst	Adrian Hoven, Erika Remberg, Hertha Feiler	Comedy	
Vier Mädels aus der Wachau (Four Girls from the Wachau)	Franz Antel	Isa Günther, Ellen Kessler	Musical comedy	Cosmos Film
War of the Maidens	Hermann Kugelstadt	Oskar Sima, Mady Rahl	Comedy	Co-production with West Germany
The Winemaker of Langenlois	Hans König	Herta Staal, Gunnar Möller		Helios-Film

== 1958 ==
Title	Director	Cast	Genre	Notes
Candidates for Marriage	Hermann Kugelstadt	Beppo Brem, Paul Hörbiger	Comedy	Co-production with West Germany
Endstation Liebe (Final Destination Love)	Georg Tressler	Horst Buchholz, Barbara Frey, Edith Elmay	Romance	Inter West Film
Eva (Die Halbzarte)	Rolf Thiele	Romy Schneider, Carlos Thompson	Comedy	Entered into the 1959 Cannes Film Festival
Hello Taxi	Hermann Kugelstadt	Hans Moser, Paul Hörbiger	Comedy	
Liebe, Mädchen und Soldaten (Love, Girls and Soldiers)	Franz Antel	Renate Holm, Willy Hagara	Musical comedy	Hope Film
One Should Be Twenty Again	Hans Quest	Karlheinz Böhm, Johanna Matz, Ewald Balser	Comedy	
The Priest and the Girl	Gustav Ucicky	Rudolf Prack, Willy Birgel, Marianne Hold	Drama	
Schwechater	Peter Kubelka		Short film	
Sebastian Kneipp	Wolfgang Liebeneiner	Carl Wery, Paul Hörbiger, Gerlinde Locker	Historical	
The Tell-Tale Heart (Das verräterische Herz)	Leopold Hainisch	Werner Krauss, Willy Dirtl	Short film, horror	

== 1959 ==
Title	Director	Cast	Genre	Notes
Arena of Fear	Arthur Maria Rabenalt	Gerhard Riedmann, Margit Nünke, Willy Birgel	Drama	
The Forests Sing Forever	Paul May	Gert Fröbe, Hansjörg Felmy, Joachim Hansen		a.k.a. Beyond Sing the Woods a.k.a. Duel with Death. Wiener Mundus-Film
My Daughter Patricia	Wolfgang Liebeneiner	Martin Held, Gerhard Riedmann, Gerlinde Locker	Comedy	
Panoptikum 59 (Panopticon 59)	Walter Kolm-Veltée			Entered into the 9th Berlin International Film Festival
Rendezvous in Vienna	Helmut Weiss	Hans Holt, Margit Saad, Peter Weck	Comedy	
Twelve Girls and One Man	Hans Quest	Toni Sailer, Margit Nünke, Gunther Philipp	Comedy	
Die unvollkommene Ehe	Robert A. Stemmle	Paula Wessely, Johanna Matz, Johannes Heesters, Dietmar Schönherr		Entered into the 1st Moscow International Film Festival
When the Bells Sound Clearly	Eduard von Borsody	Willy Birgel, Ellen Schwiers	Comedy	
