= Waltraut Haas =

Austrian actress and singer (1927–2025)

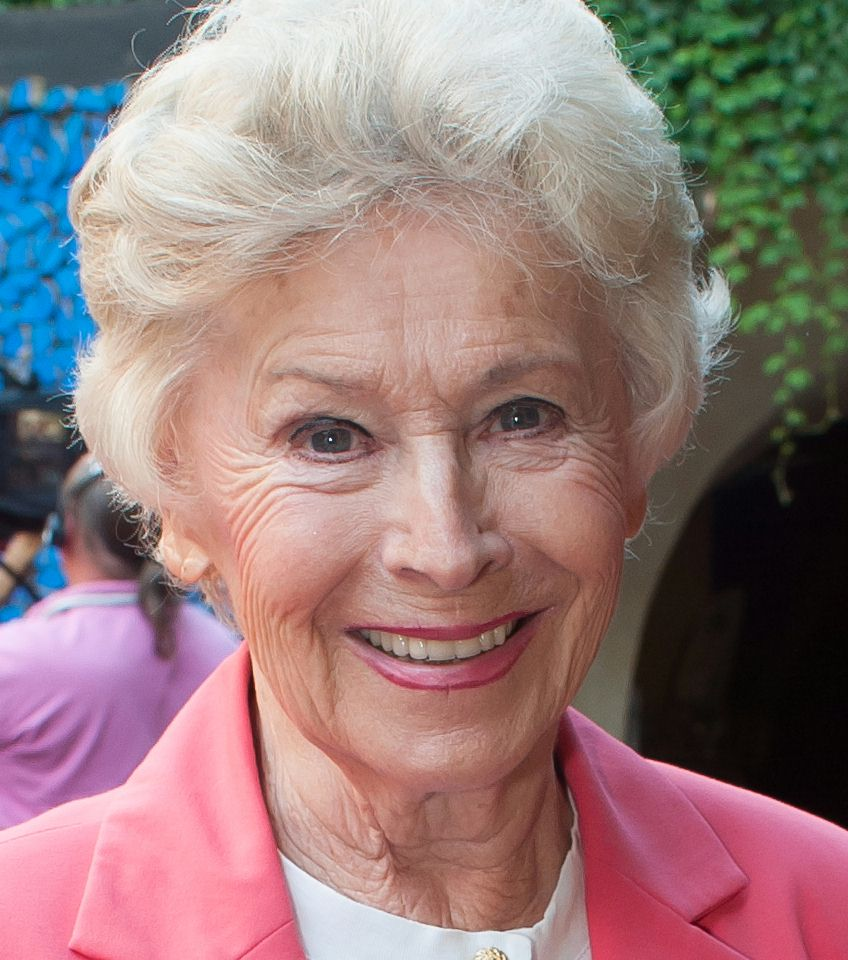
- Haas in 2016
- Born: 9 June 1927; Vienna, Austria
- Died: 23 April 2025 (aged 97); Vienna, Austria
- Occupations: Actress; Singer
- Spouse: Erwin Strahl (m. 1966; died 2011)
- Children: Marcus Strahl
- Awards: Austrian Cross of Honour for Science and Art

Waltraut Haas (9 June 1927 – 23 April 2025) was an Austrian actress and singer who appeared in around 70 films. She gained recognition in her first film, as Mariandl in Der Hofrat Geiger in 1947, and starred alongside Peter Alexander in 1960 in Im weißen Rößl. She was regarded as one of Austria's most popular actresses for decades. From the 1970s, she focused on the stage again and remained active as an actress and singer well into her 90s.

== Life and career ==
Born in Vienna on 9 June 1927, Haas grew up at Schloss Schönbrunn, where her mother was a restaurateur. Her father, a teacher, died when she was 5 years old. She first trained for three years at a fashion school during World War II, but after the war studied acting at the Konservatorium für darstellende Kunst (Conservatory for Performing Arts) and also privately with Julia Janssen, an actress at the Burgtheater.

Haas made her stage debut in Linz in 1946 and performed in Vienna at the Bürgertheater, the Stadttheater municipal theater, and the Raimund Theater. She appeared in plays and singspiels, both classical and contemporary. She also performed in Germany at the Titania-Palast theater in Berlin and the Deutsche Theater in Munich. She first appeared at the Burgtheater in 1948, and later performed at the Renaissance-Theater in Vienna.

Haas was soon drawn to the big screen. She achieved fame and recognition with her first film, discovered by Willi Forst, the cult classic Der Hofrat Geiger (1947), in which she played Mariandl alongside Maria Andergast, Hans Moser, and Paul Hörbiger. Following its success, she received many offers to play Viennese girls, appearing alongside Franz Antel, Johannes Heesters, and Curd Jürgens. She appeared in Kleiner Schwindel am Wolfgangsee, Gruß und Kuß aus der Wachau, in Hallo, Dienstmann with Moser and Hörbiger in 1952, in Der Zigeunerbaron with Gerhard Riedmann in 1954, in Wenn der Vater mit dem Sohne with Heinz Rühmann in 1955, and in Immer die Radfahrer with Heinz Erhardt and Hans-Joachim Kulenkampff in 1958. She also appeared in films directed by her husband Erwin Strahl, such as Keine Angst Liebling, ich paß schon auf. Her second signature role was Josepha Vogelhuber in the 1960 film The White Horse Inn (Im weißen Rößl) alongside Peter Alexander. She also made recordings as a singer, including Im Weißen Rössl and Wiener Lieder.

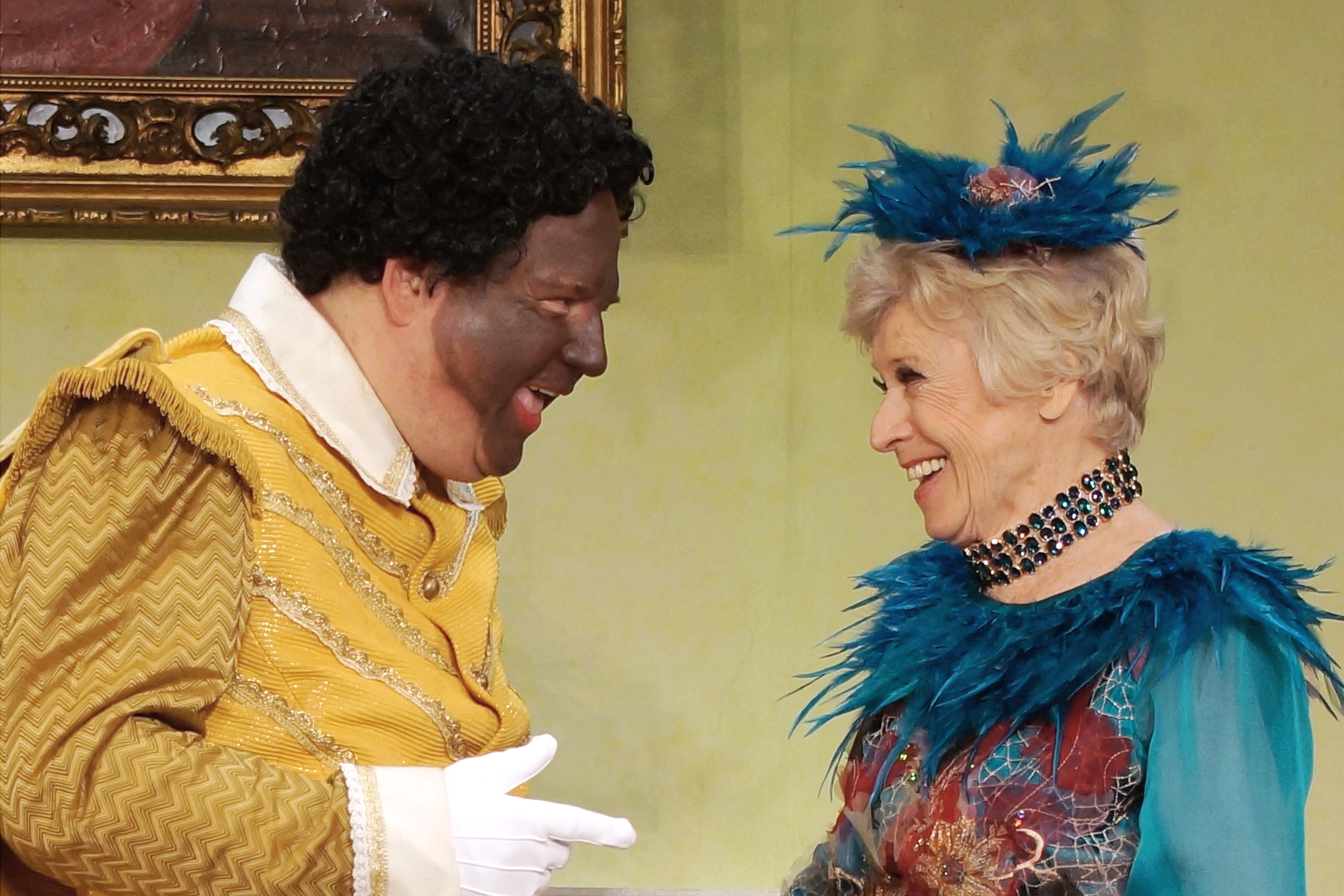
In Lend Me a Tenor, 2016

Haas said in interviews that Moser was like a father to her. He was her partner again in the sequels to her first film, Mariandl (1961) and Mariandls Heimkehr, in which she now played the role of Mariandl's mother. She received international offers but rarely appeared in international films. After 70 films, mainly comedies and musicals, she stopped making films around 1970 as the Heimatfilm genre declined. Thereafter, she focused again on stage work, often directed by her husband, and also appeared on television. In 2016, she appeared in Ken Ludwig's comedy Otello darf nicht platzen at the Gloria Theater in Vienna, alongside Gerald Pichowetz. She appeared in 2020 in Catalina Molina's television film Das Glück ist ein Vogerl.

=== Personal life ===
Haas was married to actor and director Erwin Strahl from 1966 until his death in 2011; they performed together on stage and in films. They lived in Vienna's Hietzing district. Their son Marcus Strahl became an actor and director.

In 2018, she published a memoir, Jetzt sag ich's (Now I tell you), which included accounts of meetings with Hollywood stars such as Errol Flynn and memories of working with her husband, covering both successes and disappointments.

Haas died in Vienna on 23 April 2025, at the age of 97.

== Filmography ==
Year	Title	Role	Director	Cast	Notes	Ref.
1947	Der Hofrat Geiger	Mariandl	Hans Wolff	Paul Hörbiger, Hans Moser		
1949	Kleiner Schwindel am Wolfgangsee	Trixi Gundacker	Franz Antel	Hans Holt		
1952	Hallo, Dienstmann	Hansi Scheidl	Antel	Hörbiger, Moser, Annie Rosar		
1952	Ideale Frau gesucht	Luise	Antel			
1952	Knall und Fall als Hochstapler	Bettina Brandtner	Hubert Marischka			
1952	Du bist die Rose vom Wörthersee	Kate Smith	Marischka			
1952	Der Obersteiger	Nelly Lampl	Antel			
1952	1. April 2000	Mitzi	Wolfgang Liebeneiner		Science fiction film	
1953	The Story of William Tell	Mary	Jack Cardiff	Errol Flynn	Unfinished film project	
1953	Der keusche Josef	Hilde Wolf	Carl Boese			
1953	Südliche Nächte	Eva	Robert A. Stemmle			
1953	Der Onkel aus Amerika	Elisabeth Hartung	Boese	Moser, Georg Thomalla, Grethe Weiser		
1954	Der Zigeunerbaron	Empress Maria Theresa	Arthur Maria Rabenalt		Operetta film after Der Zigeunerbaron	
1954	Das Licht der Liebe	Franzi Zeller	Stemmle	Paula Wessely	Family drama	
1955	Wenn der Vater mit dem Sohne	Gerti	Hans Quest	Heinz Rühmann		
1955	Der fröhliche Wanderer	Toni Peters	Quest	Rudolf Schock		
1955	Das Mädchen vom Pfarrhof	Annerl	Alfred Lehner	Erich Auer, Attila Hörbiger	Heimatfilm, based on the 1870 play Der Pfarrer von Kirchfeld by Ludwig Anzengruber	
1956	Die Stimme der Sehnsucht	Carola Berger	Thomas Engel	Schock		
1956	Lumpazivagabundus	Pepi Hobelmann	Antel	Hörbiger, Gunther Philipp, Joachim Fuchsberger	Based on the 1833 play by Johann Nestroy	
1956	Der Bettelstudent	Komtesse Laura	Werner Jacobs		Operetta film based on Der Bettelstudent	
1957	Jede Nacht in einem anderen Bett	Dr. Maria Kraemer	Paul Verhoeven	Gerhard Riedmann, Harald Juhnke		
1958	... denn keiner ist ohne Sünde	Mrs. Robbé	Maurice Cloche	Georges Marchal		
1958	Immer die Radfahrer	Tilla Büttner	Hans Deppe	Heinz Erhardt, Hans-Joachim Kulenkampff, Christiane Hörbiger, Mady Rahl		
1958	Der schwarze Blitz	Uschi Bauer		Toni Sailer, Dietmar Schönherr, Gustav Knuth	Heimatfilm	
1958	Eine Reise ins Glück	Renate	Wolfgang Schleif	Rudolf Prack, Oskar Sima and Theo Lingen		
1960	Im weißen Rößl	Josepha Vogelhuber	Jacobs	Peter Alexander		
1961	Junge Leute brauchen Liebe	Barbara Hagen	Géza von Cziffra	Cornelia Froboess, Johannes Heesters, Senta Berger		
1961	Mariandl	Marianne Mühlhuber	Jacobs	Froboess, Moser, Prack, Peter Weck, Susi Nicoletti		
1961	Saison in Salzburg	Theres Stolzinger	Franz Josef Gottlieb	Alexander		
1962	Hochzeitsnacht im Paradies	Regine Roeders		Alexander, Marika Rökk and Philipp	Operetta film based on the 1941 Hochzeitsnacht im Paradies	
1962	Mariandls Heimkehr	Marianne Mühlhuber	Jacobs	Froboess, Moser, Prack, Weck, Nicoletti		
1971	Außer Rand und Band am Wolfgangsee	Rössl-Wirtin	Antel			

== Awards ==
- 1987: Ehrenmedaille der Bundeshauptstadt Wien in Gold
- 2001: Ehrenzeichen für Verdienste um das Bundesland Niederösterreich
- 2001: Rose vom Wörthersee as best actress
- 2002: Austrian Cross of Honour for Science and Art
- 2006: Golden Harp, from Friends of the Operetta association
- 2008: Honorary member of the Europäische Kulturwerkstatt Berlin-Wien (EKW)
- 2010: Gold Medal of Honour (Vienna) for services to the state of Vienna
- 2016: Goldener Rathausmann of Vienna, on the occasion of her 70th stage anniversary
- 2017: Ehrenplakette of Lower Austria, on the occasion of her 90th birthday
- 2018: Dr.-Friedrich-Wilhelm-Prinz-von-Preußen-Preis from the Europäische Kulturwerkstatt, as the first recipient of the award
