= Kurzer Prozess =

1967 film

- Directed by: Michael Kehlmann
- Written by: Roderic Jeffries (novel Investigations are Proceeding)
- Starring: Helmut Qualtinger; Gudrun Thielemann
- Cinematography: Karl Schröder
- Release date: 24 November 1967
- Running time: 1h 41min
- Country: Germany
- Language: German

Kurzer Prozess is a 1967 German crime film directed by Michael Kehlmann.

== Cast ==
- Helmut Qualtinger - Inspektor Pokorny
- Gudrun Thielemann - Karin Nieburg
- Alexander Kerst - Wolfert
- Bruni Löbel - Fräulein Schebesta
- Franz Stoss - Ministerialrat Gassinger
- Kurt Sowinetz - Wokupetz
- Elisabeth Orth - Frau Nagler
- Walter Kohut - Herr Nagler
- Hertha Martin - Frau Janisch
- Willy Harlander - Polizeibeamter Janisch
- Siegfried Breuer Jr. - Vogel
- Fritz Eckhardt - Raimond Höfler
- Harry Kalenberg - Stefanitsch
