= Lilly Stepanek =

Austrian actress

- Born: 18 July 1912; Vienna, Austro-Hungarian Empire
- Died: 24 May 2004 (aged 92); Baden bei Wien, Austria
- Occupation: Actress
- Years active: 1947 - 1977 (film & TV)

Lilly Stepanek (1912–2004) was an Austrian stage actress who worked at the Burgtheater in Vienna for many years. She also starred in a handful of films such as the 1951 production Vienna Waltzes.

== Selected filmography ==
- Viennese Melodies (1947)
- Vienna Waltzes (1951)
- The Last Ten Days (1955)
- Vienna, City of My Dreams (1957)

== Bibliography ==
- Fritsche, Maria. Homemade Men in Postwar Austrian Cinema: Nationhood, Genre and Masculinity. Berghahn Books, 2013.
