= Hans Lang (Austrian composer) =

Austrian composer

External audio
- Shellac recordings with Hans Lang in the Online Archive of the Österreichische Mediathek

Hans Lang (5 July 1908, in Vienna – 28 January 1992, in Vienna) was an Austrian composer of light music, film music and Viennese songs.

He wrote one operetta, the musikalisches Lustspiel, Lisa, benimm dich!, which premiered in Vienna on 21 March 1939.

Some of his songs he performed as a duett with Maria Andergast.

== Selected songs ==
- It's Oh So Quiet
- Wozu ist die Straße da
- Lach ein bissel, wein ein bissel
- Liebe kleine Schaffnerin
- Der alte Herr Kanzleirat
- Wenn der Steffel wieder wird, so wie er war
- Mariandl
- Du bist die Rose vom Wörthersee
- Stell dir vor, es geht das Licht aus
- Wenn ich mit meinem Dackel
- Wann i blau bin-siecht mei Alte "Rot"
- Das Wiener Wetter
- Der alte Sünder

== Film music ==
- Lumpaci the Vagabond (1936)
- The Jumping Jack (1938)
- Mirror of Life (1938)
- Hurrah! I'm a Father (1939)
- Judgement Day (1940)
- Der Hofrat Geiger (1947)
- Der Herr Kanzleirat (1948)
- Dear Friend (1949)
- Der alte Sünder (1950)
- No Sin on the Alpine Pastures (1950)
- Zwei in einem Auto (1951)
- Eva erbt das Paradies (1951)
- Knall and Fall as Imposters (1952)
- Hello Porter (1952)
- Rose of the Mountain (1952)
- Die Fiakermilli (1952)
- The Mine Foreman (1952)
- Der Mann in der Wanne (1952)
- The Landlady of Maria Wörth (1952)
- Street Serenade (1953)
- Knall and Fall as Detectives (1953)
- The Emperor Waltz (1953)
- Kaisermanöver (1954)
- Die Wirtin zur Goldenen Krone (1955)
- Liebe, Schnee und Sonnenschein (1956)
- Lumpaci the Vagabond (1956)
- Engagement at Wolfgangsee (1956)
- Lügen haben hübsche Beine (1956)
- Manöverzwilling (1956)
- Imperial and Royal Field Marshal (1956)
- Emperor's Ball (1956)
- Her Corporal (1956)
- Kaiserjäger (1956)
- Ober, zahlen! (1957)
- Candidates for Marriage (1957)
- Heimweh... dort wo die Blumen blüh'n (1957)
- Die Lindenwirtin vom Donaustrand (1957)
- Immer die Radfahrer (1958)
- Hello Taxi (1958)
- Mariandl (1961)
- Mariandl's Homecoming (1962)
