= Gudrun Thielemann =

German actress (born 1926)

- Born: 16 January 1926 (age 100); Saalfeld, Thuringia, Germany
- Occupation: Actress
- Years active: 1952–1976 (film and television)

Gudrun Thielemann (born 16 January 1926) is a German former actress of stage, film and television. In 1958, she married the actor Günther Schramm.

== Selected filmography ==
- I'm Waiting for You (1952)
- Don't Forget Love (1953)
- Night Nurse Ingeborg (1958)
- Agatha, Stop That Murdering! (1960)
- Life Begins at Eight (1962)
- Kurzer Prozess (1967)

== Bibliography ==
- Goble, Alan. The Complete Index to Literary Sources in Film. Walter de Gruyter, 1999.
