= Imperial and Royal Field Marshal (1956 film) =

1956 film

- Directed by: E. W. Emo
- Written by: August Rieger; Hugo Wiener
- Starring: Rudolf Vogel; Gretl Schörg; Mady Rahl
- Cinematography: Walter Tuch
- Music by: Hans Lang
- Production company: Schönbrunn-Film
- Release date: 21 December 1956
- Running time: 90 minutes
- Country: Austria
- Language: German

Imperial and Royal Field Marshal (German: K. und k. Feldmarschall) is a 1956 Austrian historical comedy film directed by E. W. Emo and starring Rudolf Vogel, Gretl Schörg, and Mady Rahl.

It was shot at the Schönbrunn Studios in Vienna. The film's sets were designed by the art director Wolf Witzemann. It was shot in Agfacolor.

== Cast ==
- Rudolf Vogel as Hauptmann a.D. Ferdinand Kraus
- Gretl Schörg as Mizzi Elster, Soubrette
- Mady Rahl as Emma, seine Frau
- Hans von Borsody as Leutnant Rudi Müller
- Wolf Albach-Retty as Baron Linsky
- Frances Martin as Cilli, Stieftochter
- Hans Unterkircher as Oberstleutnant Kramer
- Cissy Kraner as Kathi, Köchin bei Kramer
- Boy Gobert as Manfred von Pisewitz
- Walter Barry as Oberleutnant Hofer
- Gandolf Buschbeck as Oberleutnant von Schneelein
- Martin Costa as Major Nogrady
- Peter Gerhard as Michael, Diener bei Baron Linsky
- Hugo Gottschlich as Offizier
- Johannes Hoflehner as Ein Einjähriger
- Melanie Horeschowsky as Frau Neumeier, Haushälterin bei Kraus
- Friedrich Jores as Hauptmann Kessler
- Josef Menschik as Oberleutnant von Bardoszy
- Fritz Muliar as Janos, Offizierbursche
- Otto Ritter as Oberleutnant Blatzer
- Heinz Röttinger as Oberleutnant Nagel
- Helmut Sigmund as Ein zarter Einjähriger
- Oskar Wegrostek as Offizier

== Bibliography ==
- Von Dassanowsky, Robert (2005). Austrian Cinema: A History. Jefferson, NC: McFarland. ISBN 978-1-4766-2147-0.
