= Her Corporal =

1956 film

- Directed by: E. W. Emo
- Written by: Martin Costa; August Rieger
- Starring: Peter Weck; Traute Wassler; Paul Hörbiger
- Cinematography: Sepp Riff
- Edited by: August Rieger
- Music by: Hans Lang
- Production companies: Rex-Film; Schönbrunn-Film
- Distributed by: Kopp-Filmverleih (West Germany)
- Release date: 23 August 1956
- Running time: 93 minutes
- Country: Austria
- Language: German

Her Corporal (German: Ihr Korporal or Husarenmanöver) is a 1956 Austrian historical comedy film directed by E. W. Emo and starring Peter Weck, Traute Wassler, and Paul Hörbiger.

The film's sets were designed by the art director Heinz Ockermüller. The film was shot in Agfacolor at the Schönbrunn Studios in Vienna.

== Cast ==
- Peter Weck as Roderich
- Traute Wassler as Therese
- Paul Hörbiger as Gottfried Lampl
- Rudolf Carl as Nechledil
- Louis Soldan as Korporal Fekete
- Lotte Ledl as Marie
- Friedl Czepa
- Gustl Gstettenbaur
- Wolfgang Jansen
- Harry Kratz
- Hans Unterkircher

== Bibliography ==
- Von Dassanowsky, Robert (2005). Austrian Cinema: A History. Jefferson, NC: McFarland. ISBN 978-1-4766-2147-0.
