= Young Hearts (1944 film) =

1944 film

- Directed by: Boleslaw Barlog
- Written by: E. W. Dröge (novel); Rolf Meyer; Christian Munk
- Produced by: Hans Schönmetzler
- Starring: Harald Holberg; Ingrid Lutz; Lisca Malbran
- Cinematography: Kurt Schulz
- Edited by: Walter Wischniewsky
- Music by: Werner Bochmann
- Production company: UFA
- Distributed by: Deutsche Filmvertriebs
- Release date: 30 November 1944
- Running time: 87 minutes
- Country: Germany
- Language: German

Young Hearts (German: Junge Herzen) is a 1944 German drama film directed by Boleslaw Barlog and starring Harald Holberg, Ingrid Lutz, and Lisca Malbran. The film's sets were designed by art director Anton Weber. It was made by UFA, Germany's largest studio of the era. The film was shot at the Babelsberg Studios and at the Hostivar Studios in Prague.

== Synopsis ==
A love affair evolves between two young people in Berlin.

== Cast ==
- Harald Holberg as Horst Kuhlmann
- Ingrid Lutz as Lindy
- Lisca Malbran as Luise
- Max Gülstorff as Herr Rettich
- Erika von Thellmann as Fräulein von Wartenberg
- Jaspar von Oertzen as Herr Lorenz
- Paul Westermeier as Bootsbauer
- Walter Janssen as Professor Thormeyer
- Louis Soldan as Wolf
- Heinz Lausch as Herr Michel
- Hans Richter
- Albert Florath as Obergärtner
- John Pauls-Harding as Willi
- Franz Weber as Schloßkastellan
- Hella Thornegg as Dame in der S-Bahn
- Frauke Stephan as Karin
- Edlef Schauer as Schüler
- Armin Schweizer
- Erwin Biegel
- Traute Rose as Sängerin

== Bibliography ==
- Hull, David Stewart (1969). Film in the Third Reich: A Study of the German Cinema, 1933–1945. Berkeley: University of California Press. ISBN 978-0-520-01489-3.
- Kreimeier, Klaus (1999). The Ufa Story: A History of Germany's Greatest Film Company, 1918–1945. Berkeley: University of California Press. ISBN 978-0-520-22069-0.
