= The Happy Wanderer (film) =

1955 film

- Directed by: Hans Quest
- Written by: Juliane Kay
- Produced by: Kurt Ulrich
- Starring: Rudolf Schock; Waltraut Haas; Elma Karlowa; Willy Fritsch
- Cinematography: Kurt Schulz
- Edited by: Hermann Leitner
- Music by: Norbert Schultze
- Production company: Berolina Film
- Distributed by: Herzog-Filmverleih
- Release date: 22 September 1955
- Running time: 100 minutes
- Country: West Germany
- Language: German

The Happy Wanderer (German: Der fröhliche Wanderer) is a 1955 West German romantic comedy film directed by Hans Quest. It stars Rudolf Schock, Waltraut Haas, Elma Karlowa, and Willy Fritsch. It was shot in Agfacolor at the Tempelhof Studios in West Berlin and on location in Bavaria. The film's sets were designed by the art director Hans Kuhnert.

It is a Heimatfilm that references the Wandervogel.

== Cast ==
- Rudolf Schock as Axel Wendt
- Waltraut Haas as Toni Peters
- Elma Karlowa as Rita Mehling
- Willy Fritsch as Kurt Henner
- Paul Hörbiger as Dr. Peters, Tonis Vater
- Gunther Philipp as Heini Krops
- Helen Vita as Ida
- Wolfgang Lukschy as Klaus Hoppe
- Ernst Waldow as Operndirektor
- Wolfgang Neuss as Regisseur Kneppke
- Otto H. Eck
- Peter Finkbeiner as Knabe
- Trude Hesterberg as Milena Gaad, Gesangslehrerin
- Fritz Hoppe as Bassist
- Hans Nerking Hans Nerking
- Dagmar Schock Dagmar Schock
- Edith Schollwer as Malk, Sängerin
- Fritz Wagner as 2. Tenor

== Bibliography ==
- Bock, Hans-Michael & Bergfelder, Tim. The Concise CineGraph. Encyclopedia of German Cinema. Berghahn Books, 2009. ISBN 978-0-85745-565-9.
