= Engagement at Wolfgangsee =

1956 film

- Directed by: Helmut Weiss
- Written by: Fritz Peter Buch
- Based on: Sophienlund by Helmut Weiss and Fritz von Woedtke
- Produced by: Alfred Lehr; Ernest Müller
- Starring: Ingrid Andree; Wolf Albach-Retty; Maria Andergast
- Cinematography: Walter Tuch
- Edited by: Ilse Wilken
- Music by: Hans Lang
- Production companies: Schönbrunn-Film; Österreichische Film
- Distributed by: Sascha Film; Neue Filmverleih (West Germany)
- Release date: 25 October 1956
- Running time: 90 minutes
- Country: Austria
- Language: German

Engagement at Wolfgangsee (German: Verlobung am Wolfgangsee) is a 1956 Austrian comedy film directed by Helmut Weiss and starring Ingrid Andree, Wolf Albach-Retty and Maria Andergast. The film was shot in Agfacolor at the Schönbrunn Studios in Vienna and on location around Lake Wolfgang. The film's sets were designed by the art director Wolf Witzemann. It is a remake of the 1943 film Sophienlund which was itself based on a 1941 play of the same title which Weiss co-authored. It was part of a large number of heimatfilm pictures made in Germany and Austria during the decade.

== Synopsis ==
When the Eckberg family gathers at their home by Lake Wolfgang, their father reveals to them that their relationships to each other are different to what they had been brought up to believe.

== Cast ==
- Ingrid Andree as Gabriele
- Wolf Albach-Retty as Erich Eckberg
- Maria Andergast as Sigrid Eckberg
- Michael Cramer as Knut
- Michael Heltau as Michael
- Sylvia Lund as Barbara Cleving
- Melanie Horeschowsky as Selma
- Chris Howland as Junger Engländer

== Bibliography ==
- Von Dassanowsky, Robert . Austrian Cinema. McFarland & Co, 2005.
