= Hans Unterkircher =

Austrian actor

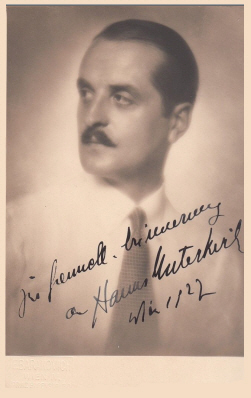
- Born: 22 August 1894; Graz, Austria-Hungary
- Died: 27 May 1971 (aged 76); Vienna, Austria
- Other name: Thornton Church
- Occupations: Actor, film director
- Years active: 1910-1971

Hans Unterkircher (22 August 1894 – 27 May 1971) was an Austrian stage, film actor and film director. He appeared in more than 60 films between 1916 and 1971. He was born in Graz, Austria and died in Vienna, Austria.

== Selected filmography ==
- The Tiger Woman (1917)
- The Deciding Kiss (1918)
- The Brazen Beauty (1918)
- The Last Laugh (1924)
- The Wonderful Adventure (1924)
- The Four Marriages of Matthias Merenus (1924)
- The Adventurous Wedding (1925)
- Love Story (1925)
- The Right to Live (1927)
- The Uncle from Sumatra (1930)
- The Emperor's Candlesticks (1936)
- Darling of the Sailors (1937)
- The Optimist (1938)
- Immortal Waltz (1939)
- Hotel Sacher (1939)
- A Mother's Love (1939)
- Beloved Augustin (1940)
- Love is Duty Free (1941)
- His Son (1942)
- Two Happy People (1943)
- On Resonant Shores (1948)
- Sarajevo (1955)
- The Blue Danube (1955)
- Her Corporal (1956)
- Imperial and Royal Field Marshal (1956)
- Schweik's Awkward Years (1964)

== See also ==
- List of Austrian film actors
