= Gerhard Winkler (composer) =

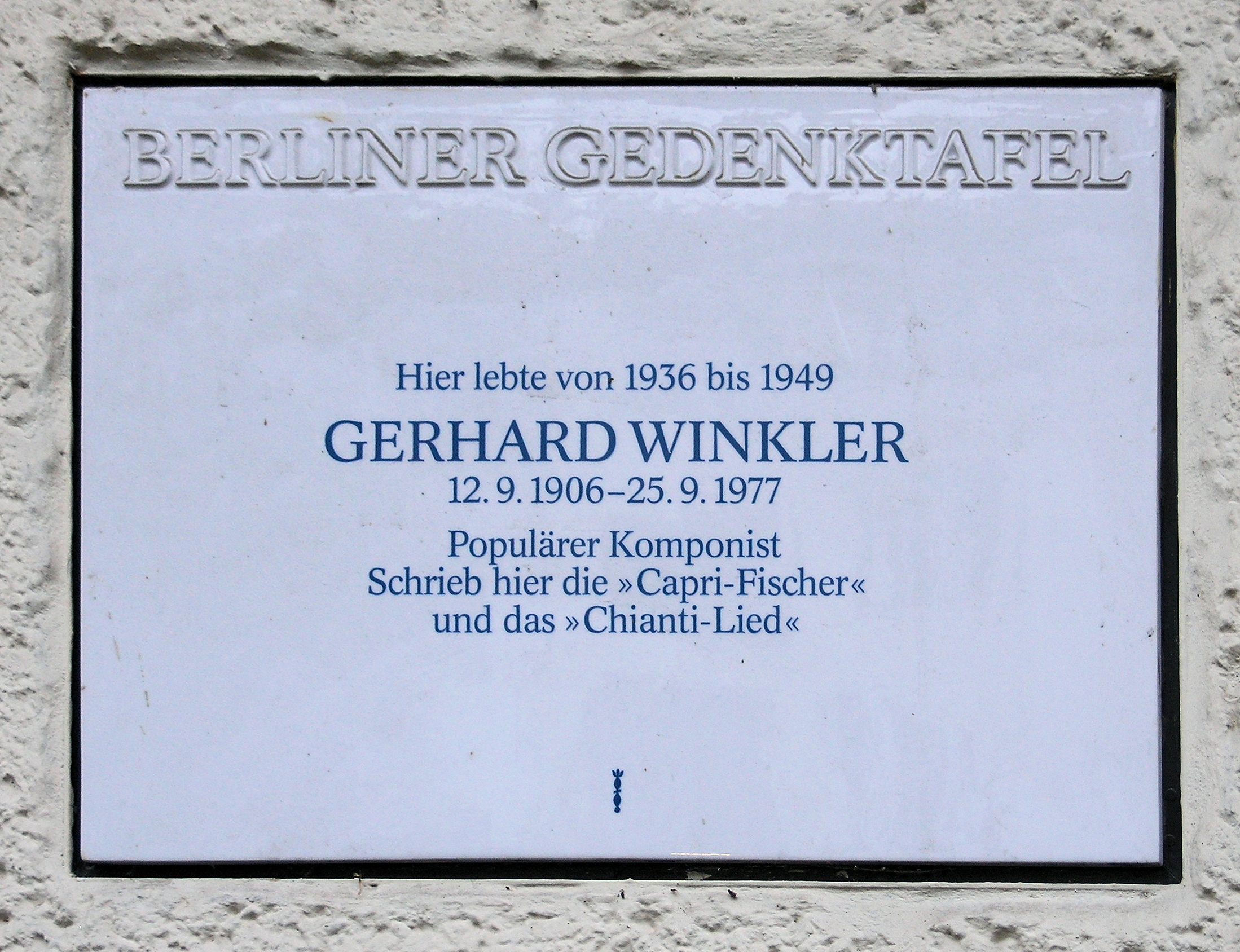

Background information
- Born: 1906; Germany
- Died: 1977 (aged 70–71) Germany
- Occupation(s): Composer, songwriter

Gerhard Winkler (1906–1977) was a German songwriter. His best-known song was "Mütterlein", co-written with Fred Rauch which became "Answer Me" in the English text of Carl Sigman. In the Netherlands it was translated in Dutch by Bob Scholte : Moeder mijn, Moeder mijn. Other songs he wrote include Heute wie vor tausend Jahren, Alles ist Bestimmung im Leben!, Mach Dir um mich doch bitte keine Sorgen, Möwe, du fliegst in die Heimat, and Capri-Fischer.

== Selected filmography ==
- Monika (1938)
- King of Hearts (1947)
- Southern Nights (1953)
- My Leopold (1955)
- The Beautiful Master (1956)
- Black Forest Melody (1956)
- In Bed by Eight (1965)
