= The Golden City (film) =

1941 film

- Directed by: Veit Harlan; Wolfgang Schleif
- Written by: Veit Harlan; Alfred Braun; Richard Billinger; Werner Eplinius
- Produced by: Veit Harlan
- Starring: Kristina Söderbaum; Eugen Klöpfer
- Cinematography: Bruno Mondi
- Edited by: Friedrich Karl von Puttkamer
- Music by: Hans-Otto Borgmann
- Release date: 25 December 1942 (Netherlands)
- Running time: 110 minutes
- Country: Germany
- Language: German
- Budget: 1.8 million ℛ︁ℳ︁
- Box office: 12.5 million ℛ︁ℳ︁

The Golden City (German: Die goldene Stadt), is a 1942 German color film directed by Veit Harlan, starring Kristina Söderbaum, who won the Volpi Cup for Best Actress.

== Plot ==
Anna, a young, innocent country girl (a Sudeten German), whose mother drowned in the swamp, dreams of visiting the golden city of Prague. After she falls in love with a surveyor, she runs away from the countryside near České Budějovice to Prague to find him. She is instead seduced and later abandoned by her cousin (a Czech). She attempts to return home, but her father rejects her, so she drowns herself in the same swamp where her mother died.

== Cast ==
- Kristina Söderbaum as Anna "Anuschka" Jobst
- Eugen Klöpfer as Melchior Jobst, Anna's father, farmer
- Annie Rosar as Donata Opferkuch, Toni's mother
- Dagny Servaes as Mrs. Tandler
- Paul Klinger as Christian Leidwein, engineer
- Emmerich Hanus
- Kurt Meisel as Toni Opferkuch, Anna's cousin
- Rudolf Prack as Thomas, Anna's fiance
- Liselotte Schreiner as Maruschka, housekeeper
- Hans Hermann Schaufuß as Nemerek, engineer
- Frida Richard as Mrs. Amend
- Ernst Legal as Pelikan, farmer
- Valy Arnheim as Alois Wengraf, notary

== Sources ==
The movie is based on drama Der Gigant by Austrian writer Richard Billinger. In the novel, however, it is the heart-broken father who commits suicide; the Nazi Propaganda Ministry, in particular Joseph Goebbels, insisted that it be the daughter rather than the father who dies.

== Motifs ==
Anna's fate and drowning are clearly represented as the natural consequence of her failure to appreciate the countryside and her longings for the city. This harmonizes with the preference for the countryside of the Blood and Soil doctrine.
