= Hello Porter =

1952 film

- Directed by: Franz Antel
- Written by: Rudolf Österreicher; Lilian Belmont; Paul Hörbiger
- Produced by: Karl Hofer; Felix R. Fohn
- Starring: Paul Hörbiger; Hans Moser; Maria Andergast
- Cinematography: Hans Heinz Theyer
- Edited by: Arnfried Heyne
- Music by: Hans Lang
- Production company: Schönbrunn-Film
- Distributed by: International Film; Constantin Film (West Germany)
- Release date: 18 January 1952
- Running time: 105 minutes
- Country: Austria
- Language: German

Hello Porter (German: Hallo Dienstmann) is a 1952 Austrian comedy film directed by Franz Antel and starring Paul Hörbiger, Hans Moser and Maria Andergast. It was shot at the Schönbrunn Studios in Vienna. The film's sets were designed by the art director Felix Smetana. Hörbiger and Moser appeared again together in the 1958 film Hello Taxi.

== Synopsis ==
A series of confusions ensue between Professor Ferdinand Godai, a music academic masquerading as a porter, and authentic porter Anton Lischka.

== Cast ==
- Paul Hörbiger as Professor Ferdinand Godai
- Hans Moser as Dienstmann Anton Lischka
- Maria Andergast as Gaby Brandstätter
- Waltraut Haas as Hansi Scheidl
- Susi Nicoletti as Susi, Godais geschiedene Frau
- Annie Rosar as Rosa, Lischkas Schwester
- Harry Fuß as Alex Lischka
- Rudolf Carl as Scheidl, Friseur
- Richard Eybner as Professor Ruhmann
- Hilde Jaeger as Frau Scheidl

== Bibliography ==
- Dassanowsky, Robert. World Film Locations: Vienna. Intellect Books, 2012.
- Fritsche, Maria. Homemade Men in Postwar Austrian Cinema: Nationhood, Genre and Masculinity. Berghahn Books, 2013.
