= On Resonant Shores =

1948 film

- Directed by: Hans Unterkircher
- Written by: Alexander Lernet-Holenia
- Produced by: Hans Unterkircher
- Starring: Marianne Schönauer; Curd Jürgens; Otto Tressler
- Cinematography: Hannes Staudinger
- Edited by: Rosemarie Foltin
- Music by: Theodor Berger
- Production company: Violantha
- Distributed by: Sascha-Film
- Release date: 15 September 1948
- Running time: 89 minutes
- Country: Austria
- Language: German

On Resonant Shores (German: An klingenden Ufern) is a 1948 Austrian drama film directed by Hans Unterkircher and starring Marianne Schönauer, Curd Jürgens and Otto Tressler. The screenplay was by Alexander Lernet-Holenia who also wrote a novella based on the story. It was shot on location in the Austrian state of Carinthia including at Gurk Cathedral and around Lake Ossiach. The film's sets were designed by the art director Ernst Rampak. It was praised by Austrian film critics.

== Synopsis ==
During the Second World War Maria Burg working as an auxiliary nurse meets a soldier in hospital, Stefan, who in civilian life was a painter. They fall in love but he is called away to the Eastern Front where is reported killed. A distraught Maria is then courted by and marries Alex, a composer, and settles with him in the Carinthian countryside.

When, unexpectedly, Stefan returns from the war alive he finds Maria no longer living in her old home, now a bombed-out house. By chance he is commissioned to do a religious painting of Saint Catherine for a monastery in Carinthia. He meets Maria again, after she is recommended to him as a model for the religious icon. However, there is no possibility of resuming their relationship because of her marriage to Alexander, who is in ill health due to his morphine addiction.

However, when Alexander dies Stefan and Maria are finally able to unite as a couple.

== Cast ==
- Marianne Schönauer as Maria Burg
- Curd Jürgens as Stefan Keller
- Cäcilia Kahr as Gabriele Wergeland
- Otto Tressler as Abt
- Karl Skraup as Onkel Benjamin
- Hans Unterkircher as Alexander Varena
- Elisabeth Markus as Frau Rainer
- Rudolf Brix as Kilian
- Oskar Hugelmann as Wirt
- Hugo Gottschlich as Franz Hofer
- Karl Köstler as Untersuchungsrichter
- Paul Horn as Stabsarzt
- Adolf Ario as Unteeroffizier

== Bibliography ==
- Fritsche, Maria. Homemade Men in Postwar Austrian Cinema: Nationhood, Genre and Masculinity. Berghahn Books, 2013.
- Von Dassanowsky, Robert. Austrian Cinema: A History. McFarland, 2005.
