= Rose of the Mountain =

1952 film

- Directed by: Hubert Marischka
- Written by: Rudolf Österreicher; Hubert Marischka
- Produced by: Hubert Marischka
- Starring: Marte Harell; Grethe Weiser; Waltraut Haas
- Cinematography: Bruno Timm
- Edited by: Walter von Bonhorst
- Music by: Hans Lang
- Production company: Algefa Film
- Distributed by: Constantin Film
- Release date: 5 December 1952
- Running time: 100 minutes
- Country: West Germany
- Language: German

Rose of the Mountain (German: Du bist die Rose vom Wörthersee) is a 1952 West German musical comedy film directed by Hubert Marischka and starring Marte Harell, Grethe Weiser and Waltraut Haas. It takes its German title from a popular 1947 song of the same name, which is used in the film as a melody. It was shot at the Spandau Studios in West Berlin and on location in Carinthia at the Hotel Karawankenblick in Pörtschach and around the lake of Wörthersee. The film's sets were designed by the art directors Willi Herrmann and Heinrich Weidemann.

== Synopsis ==
Austrian-born dancer Kate Smith and composer Jack Long meet while working on Broadway. Both are homesick and decide to return home. They go to stay at the country hotel run by Kate's sister Rose. However, it turns out that Jack and Rose are old flames.

== Cast ==
- Marte Harell as Rose Karnigg, Besitzerin Hotel 'Karawankenblick'
- Grethe Weiser as Hannelore Reichmeister, Kurgast aus Berlin
- Waltraut Haas as Kate Smith
- Hans Moser as Ferdinand Schmiedlehner, Finanzbeamter i.P.
- Curd Jürgens as Composer Jack Long
- Oskar Sima as Metzgermeister Leopold Führinger
- Franz Marischka as Thomas Führinger, sein Sohn
- Ludwig Schmitz as Jühlich
- Lotte Rausch
- Friedel Hardt

== Bibliography ==
- Robert von Dassanowsky & Oliver C. Speck. New Austrian Film. Berghahn Books, 2011.
