= Immer die Radfahrer =

1958 film

- Directed by: Hans Deppe
- Written by: Hans-Joachim Kulenkampff (story); Wolf Neumeister (screenplay)
- Produced by: Alfred Stöger (producer); Kurt Ulrich (producer)
- Starring: See below
- Cinematography: Elio Carniel
- Edited by: Renate Jelinek
- Music by: Hans Lang
- Production companies: Kurt Ulrich Filmproduktion (West Germany), Wiener Mundus-Film (Austria)
- Distributed by: Deutsche Film Hansa (West Germany)
- Release date: 1958
- Running time: 97 minutes
- Countries: Austria; West Germany
- Language: German

Immer die Radfahrer (Cyclists Forever) is a 1958 Austrian / West German comedy film directed by Hans Deppe.

== Plot summary ==
As students Fritz (Heinz Erhardt), Ulrich (Hans-Joachim Kulenkampff) and Johannes Wolf Albach-Retty came to the town of Burgsteinach on a bike tour through Carinthia. The young men each fell in love with one of the girls living there.

Ulrich, a heartthrob who had already been married three times, later made a name for himself as a film actor, Fritz married and became a successful eggnog manufacturer, and Johannes found in Tilla the woman for life and his vocation as a high school professor. In one of the last school lessons before the long holidays, he talks to his students about their plans for their free time and tells them about the trip to Burgsteinach.

He reminisces and confesses that he and his friends had actually promised the people of Burgsteinach that they would come back after five years. Due to World War II they were unable to; it has now been twenty years. On a whim he persuades his friends to finally take this bike ride again - under the conditions they had at that time, i.e. with very little money.

On the way they sleep in various guest houses and meet eccentric women when camping outside. Fritz is surprised to see his own car driven to their location where someone from his company has brought him food. The three men sneak into a barn and are punished by the farmer, forcing to work for him.

At the same time, Fritz's son Robby and his girlfriend Katinka are on a road trip through Italy and decide to catch up with them. But things become complicated when Katinka decides to hide from Robby by joining the three friends. Fritz and Johannes' wives and Ulrich's girlfriend hear rumours about their partners getting involved with women along the way. So they pick up their trail and follow them secretly. Indeed, the men run into their old flings, unaware of being watched.

They finally reach the town and meet with their old lovers, all of whom have forged their own lives and partners. Many of the townspeople are engaged in musical theater. The group quickly finds it amusing to catch up with their old friends, and they involve themselves in the production. The wives arrive just as the premiere of the operetta The Bird Dealer is commencing, which leads to some comedic situations as the men improvise hiding spaces to not be seen by them until the show is over.

After the premiere, everyone comes together, and at dinner together all misunderstandings can be cleared up. In the last scene, the group, their wives and former lovers share a meal.

== Cast ==
- Heinz Erhardt as Fritz Eilers
- Hans-Joachim Kulenkampff as Ulrich Salandt
- Wolf Albach-Retty as professor Johannes Büttner
- Waltraut Haas as Tilla Büttner
- Mady Rahl as Malchen Eilers
- Katharina Mayberg as "pussycat" Beryl
- Corny Collins as Katinka
- Christiane Hörbiger as Angelika Zander
- Inge Meysel as Sylvia Koschinsky
- Vera Balser-Eberle
- Edith Elmay as Uschi
- Eva Fichte
- Traute Duscher as Lotte
- Antonia Mittrowsky as Marianne Hopfleder
- Erna Schickl as Grete Köck
- Günther Bauer as tenor Bert Erichsen
- Walter Janssen as theatre manager Popp
- Peter Kraus as Robby Eilers

== Soundtrack ==
- Polydor - "Mit Siebzehn" (Music: Werner Scharfenberger, lyrics: Fini Busch)
