= The Mine Foreman =

The Mine Foreman (German:Der Obersteiger) may refer to

- The Mine Foreman (operetta), an 1894 operetta by Carl Zeller
- The Mine Foreman (film), a 1952 film directed by Franz Antel
