= Cabaret (1954 film) =

1954 film

- Directed by: Willi Forst
- Written by: Willi Forst; Johannes Mario Simmel
- Produced by: Otto Lehmann; Günther Stapenhorst
- Starring: Paul Henreid; Eva Kerbler; Fritz Schulz
- Cinematography: Günther Anders
- Edited by: Lilian Seng
- Music by: Willy Schmidt-Gentner
- Production company: Carlton-Film
- Distributed by: Neue Filmverleih
- Release date: 15 April 1954
- Running time: 85 minutes
- Country: West Germany
- Language: German

Cabaret (German: Kabarett or Dieses Lied bleibt bei Dir) is a 1954 West German drama film directed by Willi Forst and starring Paul Henreid, Eva Kerbler and Fritz Schulz. It was shot at the Bavaria Studios in Munich. The film's sets were designed by the art director Willy Schatz and Werner Schlichting.

== Cast ==
- Paul Henreid as Konrad Hegner
- Eva Kerbler as Leonie
- Fritz Schulz as Conferencier
- Dorit Kreysler as Franzi Holm
- Elma Karlowa as Trixie
- Ernst Stankovski as Karl Haller
- Nicole Heesters as Valerie
- Paula Braend as Die junge Isolde
- Gretl Fröhlich as Die alte Isolde
- Edith Schollwer as Baronin Solms
- Melanie Horeschowsky as Frau Hugl
- Friedrich Domin as Paul Lincke
- Leopold Hainisch as Leopold Holzinger
- Charles Regnier as Musik-Kritiker

== Bibliography ==
- Bock, Hans-Michael and Bergfelder, Tim. The Concise Cinegraph: An Encyclopedia of German Cinema. Berghahn Books, 2009.
