= Don't Forget Love =

1953 film

- Directed by: Paul Verhoeven
- Written by: Juliane Kay; Paul Verhoeven
- Produced by: Franz Tappers; Helmut Ungerland
- Starring: Luise Ullrich; Paul Dahlke; Will Quadflieg
- Cinematography: Franz Weihmayr
- Edited by: Klaus Dudenhöfer
- Music by: Alois Melichar
- Production company: Standard-Filmverleih
- Distributed by: NWDF
- Release date: 2 April 1953
- Running time: 100 minutes
- Country: West Germany
- Language: German

Don't Forget Love (German: Vergiß die Liebe nicht) is a 1953 West German romantic comedy film directed by Paul Verhoeven and starring Luise Ullrich, Paul Dahlke and Will Quadflieg. It was shot at the Wandsbek Studios as well as on location in Hamburg and Innsbruck. The film's sets were designed by the art directors Hermann Warm and Heinrich Weidemann.

== Synopsis ==
A couple's marriage becomes strained when the husband becomes too busy and neglects his wife.

== Cast ==
- Luise Ullrich as Anna Kienzel
- Paul Dahlke as Dr. Franz Kienzel
- Will Quadflieg as Paul Cornelius
- Annie Rosar as Frau Stadler, Haushälterin
- Carl-Heinz Schroth as Nino Pizzini
- Charlott Daudert as Nora Pizzini
- Lis Van Essen as Käthe Kienzel
- Beate Koepnick as Tilly Kienzel
- Frank Riedmüller as Walter Kienzel
- Eckart Dux as Freddy
- Ilse Bally as Jeanne Löhr
- Erwin Linder as Andreas Löhr
- Hans Friedrich as Herr Wendel
- Gudrun Thielemann as Frau Wendel

== Bibliography ==
- Hake, Sabine. German National Cinema. Routledge, 2002.
