= Mariandl =

1961 film

- Directed by: Werner Jacobs
- Written by: Janne Furch
- Produced by: Herbert Gruber
- Starring: Cornelia Froboess; Rudolf Prack; Waltraut Haas
- Cinematography: Elio Carniel
- Edited by: Arnfried Heyne
- Music by: Johannes Fehring; Hans Lang
- Production company: Sascha Film
- Distributed by: Constantin Film
- Release date: 25 August 1961
- Running time: 85 minutes
- Country: Austria
- Language: German

Mariandl is a 1961 Austrian drama film directed by Werner Jacobs and starring Cornelia Froboess, Rudolf Prack and Waltraut Haas. It was followed by a sequel Mariandl's Homecoming in 1962. A girl living in a hotel aspires to a musical scholarship.

The film's sets were designed by the art directors Fritz Jüptner-Jonstorff and Alexander Sawczynski.

== Song: "Mariandl" ==
Part of the film soundtrack is the single "Mariandl" which was composed by Hans Lang. The song had been translated into an English version which was sung by Petula Clark and Jimmy Young.

== Cast ==
- Cornelia Froboess as Mariandl
- Rudolf Prack as Hofrat Franz Geiger
- Waltraut Haas as Marianne Mühlhuber
- Hans Moser as Opa Windischgruber
- Gunther Philipp as Gustl Pfüller
- Peter Weck as Peter Hofer
- Susi Nicoletti as Franzi
- Edith Elmay as Steffi Holler
- Andrea Klass as Liesl
- Elisabeth Stiepl as Theres, Kellnerin
- Hugo Gottschlich as Ferdl, Dienstmann

== See also ==
- Der Hofrat Geiger (1947)
