= Monika (1938 film) =

1938 film

- Directed by: Heinz Helbig
- Written by: Erich Ebermayer (novel); Heinz Helbig
- Produced by: Gustav Althoff; Walter Tost
- Starring: Maria Andergast; Iván Petrovich; Theodor Loos
- Cinematography: Edgar S. Ziesemer
- Music by: Gerhard Winkler
- Production company: Aco-Film
- Distributed by: Various
- Release date: 5 January 1938
- Country: Germany
- Language: German

Monika or A Mother Fights for Her Child (German: Eine Mutter kämpft um ihr Kind) is a 1938 German drama film directed by Heinz Helbig and starring Maria Andergast, Iván Petrovich, and Theodor Loos.

== Synopsis ==
An unmarried German couple, an engineer and singer, have a child together in São Paulo. Due to her ambitions for her career she abandons the daughter, leaving her in the care of the father who returns to Germany. Eight years later the mother, now a famous film star, demands custody of the daughter.

== Cast ==
- Maria Andergast as Barbara Daalen
- Iván Petrovich as Dr. Michael Holt
- Carmen Lahrmann as Monika
- Theodor Loos as Professor Waldeck
- Willi Schaeffers as Film Director
- Rudolf Platte as Camera Man
- Julia Serda as Frau von Schadow
- Ilse Petri as Inge, Monika's Friend
- Walter Steinbeck as Manager Wallen
- Erich Dunskus as Hotel Director
- Gustav Püttjer as Oberleutnant
- Karl Platen as Diener
- Peer Baedecker as Knapp
- Max Wilmsen as Geheimrat
- Ilse Abel as Krankenschwester
- Herbert Ernst Groh as Singer
- Kurt Iller as Gast der Kaschemme
- Oskar Höcker as Thielmann
- Peter Busse as Der Wirt
- Fanny Cotta as Krankenschwest
- Gerhard Dammann as Der Schalplattenverkäufer
- Fritz Draeger as Statist bei d. Aufnahme in Hotel
- Eugen von Bongardt as Dr. Scherber
- Wilmo Schäfer
- Raffles Bill
