= Der Hofrat Geiger =

- Directed by: Hans Wolff
- Starring: Paul Hörbiger; Maria Andergast; Hans Moser; Waltraut Haas
- Cinematography: Rudolf Icsey
- Music by: Hans Lang
- Release date: 1947
- Running time: 93 minutes
- Country: Austria
- Language: German

Der Hofrat Geiger is a 1947 Austrian film directed by Hans Wolff, based on the musical of the same name by Martin Costa. It is significant for being one of the first Heimatfilme released after the Second World War, and very successful.

== Synopsis ==
Hofrat Franz Geiger (Paul Hörbiger), a former high-ranking civil servant, lives a very secluded life in Vienna since he retired when the Nazis came into power in Austria in 1938. His friend and secretary Ferdinand Lechner (Hans Moser) tries to make retirement easier for Hofrat Geiger, and so Lechner frequently gets old files for the Hofrat. The overprotective Lechner has convinced the Hofrat that his successors are in dire need for his help on those files.

In one of these old documents, Geiger learns that he has a daughter with Marianne Mühlhuber (Maria Andergast). They had met and had a short affair with each other in the summer of 1929 in Spitz an der Donau, in the Wachau region, but have not met since then. The aging bachelor Geiger immediately decides to travel there.

In present Spitz, Marianne Mühlhuber leads a dreary existence as the housekeeper of the run-down inn "Blaue Gans", where the aged owner Windischgruber (Joseph Egger) had taken her in with her illegitimate child Mariandl (Waltraut Haas), to work at the inn, in exchange for board and lodging. However, the guests are staying away and debts are mounting. Marianne is being courted intensely by Mathias Pfüller (Hermann Erhardt), the mayor, butcher, and owner of the more popular inn "Goldener Ochse".

Her 17-year-old daughter Mariandl is madly in love with the house servant Hans (Louis Soldan). Since Hans has no money and no good position, Marianne tries to put an end to this romance, so that her daughter won't have an illegitimate child like her.

When Hofrat Geiger and Lechner travel to Spitz, Geiger is received coldly and dismissively by Marianne. He wants to leave again, but then meets his daughter, who does not know him, and decides to stay in Spitz. Meanwhile, Pfüller informs Marianne that, due to her place of origin in Znojmo, Czechoslovakia, she is not an Austrian citizen and in danger of deportation. Pfüller advises her to marry an Austrian to obtain citizenship. Marianne does get married, but not to Pfüller. Instead, she marries Geiger, who has offered her help in order to make up for past mistakes.

Geiger and Marianne have agreed that the marriage will exist only on paper. To regain her independence, she travels to Vienna to apply for her own Austrian citizenship. Without her knowledge, her file is handled by Geiger, who was called back into his old position. Geiger ensures that the process drags on for nearly a year, time that Marianne spends completely in Vienna.

Marianne returns to Spitz together with Geiger — "because of Pfüller and the people in general" — and experiences one surprise after another: the "Blaue Gans" has been renovated and is bustling with guests, Mariandl and Hans have married and now have a legitimate little child, also called Mariandl. Marianne is initially furious that Geiger has orchestrated and financed all of this behind her back. She finally learns the reason for everything he has done: because he loves her.

== Cast ==
- Paul Hörbiger as Franz Geiger, a retired Hofrat
- Maria Andergast as Marianne Mühlhuber
- Hans Moser as Ferdinand Lechner
- Waltraut Haas as Mariandl
- Josef Egger as Old Windischgruber
- Hermann Erhardt as Mathias Pfüller
- Louis Soldan as Hans

== See also ==
- Mariandl (1961)
