= Melanie Horeschowsky =

Austrian actress

- Born: 26 November 1901; Vienna, Austro-Hungarian Empire
- Died: 13 February 1983 (aged 81); Munich, Bavaria, West Germany
- Occupation: Actress
- Years active: 1931-1983 (film & TV)

Melanie Horeschowsky (26 November 1901–13 February 1983) was an Austrian stage, film and television actress.

== Selected filmography ==
- The Prodigal Son (1934)
- Der Kaiser von Kalifornien (1936)
- Another World (1937)
- Clarissa (1941)
- What Does Brigitte Want? (1941)
- The Night in Venice (1942)
- The Rainer Case (1942)
- Melody of a Great City (1943)
- Insolent and in Love (1948)
- Arlberg Express (1948)
- Bonus on Death (1950)
- A Heidelberg Romance (1951)
- Your Heart Is My Homeland (1953)
- Maxie (1954)
- Cabaret (1954)
- Engagement at Wolfgangsee (1956)
- Imperial and Royal Field Marshal (1956)
- So ein Millionär hat's schwer (1958)
- Panoptikum 59 (1959)
- What a Woman Dreams of in Springtime (1959)
- Congress of Love (1966)
- The Dance of Death (1967)
- Student of the Bedroom (1970)
- Liebe Melanie (1983, TV film)

== Bibliography ==
- Giesen, Rolf. Nazi Propaganda Films: A History and Filmography. McFarland, 2003.
