= Hugo Gottschlich =

Austrian actor (1905–1984)

- Born: 30 October 1905; Vienna, Austria
- Died: 22 March 1984 (aged 78); Vienna, Austria
- Occupation: Actor
- Years active: 1939-1984 (film & TV)

Hugo Gottschlich (1905–1984) was an Austrian stage and film actor, who specialised in Viennese character parts. Later in his career he appeared frequently on television.

== Selected filmography ==
- Arlberg Express (1948)
- Fregola (1948)
- On Resonant Shores (1948)
- Kissing Is No Sin (1950)
- Cordula (1950)
- City Park (1951)
- Miracles Still Happen (1951)
- White Shadows (1951)
- Vienna Waltzes (1951)
- 1. April 2000 (1952)
- A Night in Venice (1953)
- To Be Without Worries (1953)
- Anna Louise and Anton (1953)
- The Spendthrift (1953)
- The Red Prince (1954)
- Mozart (1955)
- Sarajevo (1955)
- Imperial and Royal Field Marshal (1956)
- The Saint and Her Fool (1957)
- Vienna, City of My Dreams (1957)
- And Lead Us Not Into Temptation (1957)
- Candidates for Marriage (1958)
- The Priest and the Girl (1958)
- The Good Soldier Schweik (1960)
- Mariandl (1961)
- Mariandl's Homecoming (1962)
- Marry Me, Cherie (1964)
- Schweik's Awkward Years (1964)
- Der Weibsteufel (1966)

== Bibliography ==
- Fritsche, Maria. Homemade Men In Postwar Austrian Cinema: Nationhood, Genre and Masculinity . Berghahn Books, 2013.
