= Mariandl's Homecoming =

1962 film

- Directed by: Werner Jacobs
- Written by: Janne Furch
- Produced by: Herbert Gruber
- Starring: Cornelia Froboess; Rudolf Prack; Waltraut Haas
- Cinematography: Sepp Ketterer
- Edited by: Arnfried Heyne
- Music by: Christian Bruhn; Heinz Gietz; Hans Lang
- Production company: Sascha Film
- Distributed by: Constantin Film
- Release date: 11 October 1962
- Running time: 93 minutes
- Country: Austria
- Language: German

Mariandl's Homecoming (German: Mariandls Heimkehr) is a 1962 Austrian musical drama film directed by Werner Jacobs and starring Cornelia Froboess, Rudolf Prack and Waltraut Haas. It is a sequel to the 1961 film Mariandl.

It was shot at the Sievering Studios in Vienna. The film's sets were designed by the art directors Fritz Jüptner-Jonstorff and Alexander Sawczynski.

== Cast ==
- Cornelia Froboess as Mariandl
- Rudolf Prack as Hofrat Franz Geiger
- Waltraut Haas as Marianne Mühlhuber
- Gunther Philipp as Gustl Pfüller
- Peter Weck as Peter Hofer
- Susi Nicoletti as Franzi
- Sieghardt Rupp as Deininger
- Horst Naumann as Burghaus
- Andrea Klass as Liesl - Franzis Freundin
- Dany Sigel as Muschi
- Eva Iro as Erika
- Hugo Gottschlich as Ferdl, Dienstmann
- Peter Machac as Fritz
- Hans Moser as Opa Windischgruber
