= Santa Lucia (film) =

1956 film

- German film poster
- Directed by: Werner Jacobs
- Written by: Ursula Bloy; Ralph Lothar; Helmut Weiss
- Produced by: Erwin Gitt; Willy Zeyn
- Starring: Vico Torriani; Eva Kerbler; Peer Schmidt
- Cinematography: Oskar Schnirch
- Edited by: Lisbeth Neumann
- Music by: Willy Mattes
- Production company: Willy Zeyn-Film
- Distributed by: Gloria Film
- Release date: 20 August 1956
- Running time: 95 minutes
- Country: West Germany
- Language: German

Santa Lucia is a 1956 West German musical comedy film directed by Werner Jacobs and starring Vico Torriani, Eva Kerbler and Peer Schmidt.

The film's sets were designed by the art director Hans Berthel. It was shot using Eastmancolor.

== Cast ==
- Vico Torriani as Mario Zorzoli
- Eva Kerbler as Yvonne von Fouqué
- Peer Schmidt as Aristide
- Karin Dor as Manina
- Alexander Golling as Bärtiger
- Hubert von Meyerinck as Tutu
- Heinz-Leo Fischer as Vittorio
- Margarete Haagen as Clementine
- Edith Schultze-Westrum as Tante Rosa
- Shirley Brown as Gina
- Peter Fischer as Peppino
