= Fregola (film) =

1948 Austrian musical film

- Film poster
- Directed by: Harald Röbbeling
- Written by: Karl Farkas; Harald Röbbeling
- Starring: Marika Rökk; Rudolf Prack; Siegfried Breuer; Gustav Waldau
- Cinematography: Günther Anders; Hannes Staudinger
- Edited by: Margarete Smolka
- Music by: Theo Nordhaus; Willy Schmidt-Gentner
- Production company: Styria-Film
- Distributed by: Sascha Film
- Release date: 25 December 1948
- Running time: 90 minutes
- Country: Austria
- Language: German

Fregola is a 1948 Austrian musical film directed by Harald Röbbeling and starring Marika Rökk, Rudolf Prack and Siegfried Breuer. It was a comeback film for Rökk, one of the most popular stars of the Third Reich, who hadn't made a film since 1944. It was shot at the Sievering Studios in Vienna. The film was released on the day of Christmas 1948 in Vienna, and on the 4th of July 1949 in Munich.

The film was popular with West German audiences, particularly amongst women.

== Cast ==
- Marika Rökk as Fregola
- Rudolf Prack as Santos
- Siegfried Breuer as Pablo Mendez
- Gustav Waldau as Flock
- Josef Meinrad as Dr. Wegscheider
- Theodor Danegger as Boulanger
- Hans Jungbauer as Dr. Ribault
- Jo Fürst as Don Fernandez
- Erich Schiffer as Solotänzer
- Otto Gottsberger as Solotänzer
- Hugo Gottschlich as Brunet

== Bibliography ==
- Bergfelder, Tim. International Adventures: German Popular Cinema and European Co-Productions in the 1960s. Berghahn Books, 2005.
- Dassanowsky, Robert. Austrian Cinema: A History. McFarland & Company Incorporated Pub, 2005.
