= Louis Soldan =

Austrian actor

- Born: 19 March 1920; Vienna
- Died: 25 April 1971 (aged 51); Vienna
- Occupation: Actor

Louis Soldan (19 March 1920 – 25 April 1971) was an Austrian actor.

== Biography ==
Louis Soldan was the son of the shoe manufacturer Alois Soldan. After middle school, he trained as an actor at the Drama Seminar of Dr. Beer.

Soldan appeared in various film, television and radio play productions.

From 1950 to 1951, he acted in a theater in Graz. This was followed by appearances at the Volkstheater in Vienna starting in 1951. From 1954 to 1958 he was a member of the ensemble of the Theater in der Josefstadt.

== Selected filmography ==
- 1940: Operetta
- 1942: The Second Shot
- 1943: A Salzburg Comedy
- 1944: Young Hearts
- 1947: Der Hofrat Geiger
- 1953: Franz Schubert
- 1955: Sarajevo
- 1956: Her Corporal
- 1958: So ein Millionär hat's schwer
