= The Three Around Christine =

1936 film

- Directed by: Hans Deppe
- Written by: Marie Luise Droop
- Produced by: Otto Ernst Lubitz
- Starring: Maria Andergast; Hans Söhnker; Fritz Kampers
- Cinematography: Franz Koch
- Edited by: Gottlieb Madl
- Music by: Toni Thoms
- Production company: Bavaria Film
- Distributed by: Bavaria Film
- Release date: 18 June 1936
- Running time: 90 minutes
- Country: Germany
- Language: German

The Three Around Christine (German: Die Drei um Christine) is a 1936 German comedy film directed by Hans Deppe and starring Maria Andergast, Hans Söhnker and Fritz Kampers. It was made at the Bavaria Studios in Munich. The film's sets were designed by the art director Max Seefelder.

== Cast ==
- Maria Andergast as Christine Biehler
- Hans Söhnker as Eggert
- Fritz Kampers as Bachmoser - Bürgermeister
- Gustav Waldau as Traugott
- Georg Vogel as Balther
- Lola Chlud as Hella
- Ernst Behmer as Barbier
- Käthe Braun as Bärble
- Elise Aulinger as Ursl
- Justus Paris as Hornerer
- Philipp Weichand as Stolzinger
- Beppo Brem as Matthias
- Kurt Hagen
- Franz Koch

== Bibliography ==
- Jill Nelmes & Jule Selbo. Women Screenwriters: An International Guide. Palgrave Macmillan, 2015.
