= The Mystery of Betty Bonn =

1938 film directed by Robert A. Stemmle

- Directed by: Robert A. Stemmle
- Written by: Ernst Hasselbach; Robert A. Stemmle
- Based on: Der Streit um die Betty Bonn by Friedrich Lindemann
- Produced by: Ernst Krüger; Hans Herbert Ulrich; Georg Witt
- Starring: Maria Andergast; Theodor Loos; Hans Nielsen; Erich Ponto
- Cinematography: Otto Baecker
- Edited by: Herbert B. Fredersdorf
- Music by: Herbert Windt
- Production company: Georg Witt-Film
- Distributed by: UFA
- Release date: 4 February 1938
- Running time: 94 minutes
- Country: Germany
- Language: German

The Mystery of Betty Bonn (German: Das Geheimnis um Betty Bonn) is a 1938 German adventure film directed by Robert A. Stemmle and starring Maria Andergast, Theodor Loos and Hans Nielsen. The film was shot at the Babelsberg Studios in Berlin with sets designed by the art directors Wilhelm Depenau and Ludwig Reiber. It was made by the leading German company UFA, based on a novel by Friedrich Lindemann.

== Synopsis ==
A British attorney working on a small island wants to return home to London, but first has to solve a mysterious crime.

== Cast ==
- Maria Andergast as Nancy Trevor
- Theodor Loos as Prosecutor Trevor, her father
- Hans Nielsen as Jack Winsloe - Schriftsteller
- Erich Ponto as Kapitän Spurling
- Maria Eiselt as Betty Bonn
- Josef Sieber as Steuermann Crane
- Hellmuth Bergmann as Kapitän Glower
- Reinhold Bernt as Matrose Clements
- Albert Hörrmann as Matrose Colcord
- Herbert Schimkat as Matrose Bailey
- Werner Scharf as Matrose Finley
- Karl Bergeest as Matrose Klinkmoeller
- Albert Venohr as Matrose Clyde
- Louis Brody as Matrose Higgins
- Martin Rickelt as Schiffsjunge Emmo Svedlund
- Paul Otto as Gerichtspräsident Sir W. Douglas
- Valy Arnheim as Konsul Spring
- Kate Kühl as Emmely Bolston
- Erhard Siedel as Thompson - amerik. Reeder
- Bruno Fritz as Reeder Winchester
- Willi Schaeffers as Kapitän Convey
- Karl Hellmer as Mac Canister
- Karl Vogt as Cecil Palmer
- Bob Bauer
- Karl Fisser
- Charlotte Fredersdorf
- Adalbert Fuhlrott
- Otto F. Henning
- Richard Ludwig
- Hellmuth Passarge
- Lotte Spira
- Hans Sternberg
- Kurt Weisse
- Odette Orsy
- Fritz Berghof
- Friedrich Weigelt
- Viktor Bell

== Bibliography ==
- Kreimeier, Klaus (1999). The Ufa Story: A History of Germany's Greatest Film Company, 1918–1945. University of California Press. ISBN 978-0-520-22069-0.
