= Hannes Staudinger =

Austrian cinematographer

- Born: 5 March 1907; Wörgl, Austro-Hungarian Empire
- Died: 1 August 1974 (aged 67); Munich, Bavaria, West Germany
- Occupation: Cinematographer
- Years active: 1936-1972

Hannes Staudinger (5 March 1907 – 1 August 1974) was an Austrian cinematographer.

== Selected filmography ==
- Women Are No Angels (1943)
- Viennese Girls (1945)
- Fregola (1948)
- On Resonant Shores (1948)
- Eroica (1949)
- Bonus on Death (1950)
- Vienna Waltzes (1951)
- Dunja (1955)
- Kaiserjäger (1956)
- The Daring Swimmer (1957)
- The Priest and the Girl (1958)
- Twelve Girls and One Man (1959)
- The Merry Wives of Windsor (1965)
- The Long Day of Inspector Blomfield (1968)
- Age of Consent (1969)
- Superbug, Super Agent (1972)

== Bibliography ==
- Fritsche, Maria. Homemade Men In Postwar Austrian Cinema: Nationhood, Genre and Masculinity . Berghahn Books, 2013.
