= Judith Holzmeister =

Austrian actress

Judith Maria Holzmeister
- Born: 14 February 1920; Innsbruck, Austria
- Died: 23 June 2008 (aged 88); Baden, Austria
- Spouse(s): Curd Jürgens (1947–1955); Bruno Dallansky (1959–2008)
- Awards: Kainz Medal

Judith Maria Holzmeister (14 February 1920 – 23 June 2008) was an Austrian actress. Her performances included Kunigunde opposite Ewald Balser in Franz Grillparzer's König Ottokars Glück und Ende at the reopening of the famed Vienna Burgtheater in 1955.

Judith Holzmeister was born in Innsbruck, Austria, on 14 February 1920, the daughter of Clemens Holzmeister. She began her career in acting with her debut at the Provincial Theater in Linz, Austria. Holzmeister began working at the Burgtheater in 1947, and remained at that particular theater until her retirement.

Holzmeister worked at the Vienna Volkstheater during World War II. She was involved with anti-Nazi resistance groups during the war and helped to hide Jews from Nazi German authorities.

Holzmeister also enjoyed an acting career within television and film. She was a recipient of the Kainz Medal, an award for prominent actors which was handed out annually between 1958 and 1999.

She was married to the actors Curd Jürgens (1947–1955) and Bruno Dallansky (1959 until her death in 2008).

Judith Holzmeister died at the age of 88 on 23 June 2008, in Baden, Austria. Dallansky died six weeks later.

== Selected filmography ==
- The Fire Devil (1940)
- Viennese Girls (1945)
- Bonus on Death (1950)
- House of Life (1952)
- Goetz von Berlichingen (1955)
- Like a Tear in the Ocean (1970, TV miniseries)
