= Sarajevo (1955 film) =

1955 film

- Directed by: Fritz Kortner
- Written by: Robert Thoeren
- Produced by: Alfred Stöger
- Starring: Luise Ullrich; Ewald Balser; Franz Stoss; Hans Thimig
- Cinematography: Heinz Hölscher
- Edited by: Renate Jelinek; Friederike Wieder
- Music by: Winfried Zillig
- Production company: Wiener Mundus-Film
- Distributed by: Union-Film
- Release date: 17 October 1955
- Running time: 95 minutes
- Country: Austria
- Language: German

Sarajevo (German: Um Thron und Liebe) is a 1955 Austrian historical film directed by Fritz Kortner and starring Luise Ullrich, Ewald Balser and Franz Stoss. The film portrays the assassination of Archduke Franz Ferdinand of Austria in 1914. It proved controversial on its release.

== Partial cast ==
- Luise Ullrich - Sophie Chotek
- Ewald Balser - Franz Ferdinand
- Franz Stoss - Oskar Potiorek
- Hans Thimig as Rumerskirch
- Louis Soldan as Merizzi
- Harry Hardt as Bardolff
- Hans Unterkircher as Graf Harrach
- Erik Frey as Pokorny
- Hans Olden as Durchlaucht
- Carl Bosse as Müller, Polizeibeamter
- Karl Skraup as Radic, Polizeibeamter
- Wolfried Lier - Danilo Ilic
- Hubert Hilten - Gavrilo Princip
- Michael Lenz - Trifko Grabez
- Klaus Kinski - Nedeljko Cabrinovic
- Josef Meinrad as 1. Chauffeur
- Hugo Gottschlich as 2. Chauffeur
- Erika Remberg as Nadja

== Bibliography ==
- Fritsche, Maria. Homemade Men In Postwar Austrian Cinema: Nationhood, Genre and Masculinity. Berghahn Books, 2013.
