= The Mine Foreman (film) =

- Directed by: Franz Antel
- Written by: Jutta Bornemann; Gunther Philipp; Friedrich Schreyvogel; Franz Antel
- Starring: Hans Holt; Josefin Kipper; Wolf Albach-Retty
- Cinematography: Hans Heinz Theyer
- Edited by: Arnfried Heyne
- Music by: Hans Lang
- Production company: Patria Filmkunst
- Distributed by: Löwen-Filmverleih
- Release date: 3 November 1952
- Running time: 90 minutes
- Country: Austria
- Language: German

The Mine Foreman (German: Der Obersteiger) is a 1952 Austrian historical musical film directed by Franz Antel and starring Hans Holt, Josefin Kipper and Wolf Albach-Retty. The film is an operetta film, which is based on the libretto of the 1894 operetta of the same title by Ludwig Held and Moritz West. It is set in the reign of Ludwig I of Bavaria. The film's sets were designed by Isabella and Werner Schlichting.

== Cast ==
- Hans Holt as Max, Herzog von Bayern
- Josefin Kipper as Prinzessin Luise
- Wolf Albach-Retty as Andreas Spaun, ein Kavalier
- Waltraut Haas as Nelly Lampl
- Grethe Weiser as Clara Blankenfeld, Kammerfrau
- Gunther Philipp as Medardus von Krieglstein, Adjutant
- Oskar Sima as Matthieas Lampl, Löwenwirt in Hallstatt
- Annie Rosar as Stasi, Kellnerin
- Theodor Danegger as Hofkammeradjunkt Pötzl
- Helene Lauterböck as Gräfin Amalie von Sensheim
- Rudolf Carl as Obersteiger aus Berchtesgaden
- Joseph Egger as Praxmarer, Obersteiger aus Hallstatt
- Raoul Retzer as Blasius, Hausdiener
- Walter Janssen as König Ludwig I. von Bayern

== Bibliography ==
- Robert Dassanowsky. Austrian Cinema: A History. McFarland, 2005.
