= Child of the Danube =

1950 film

- German: Kind der Donau
- Directed by: Georg Jacoby
- Written by: Georg Jacoby; Friedrich Schreyvogel
- Produced by: Karl Brenneis; Josef A. Vesely
- Starring: Marika Rökk; Fred Liewehr; Nadja Tiller
- Cinematography: Hanns König; Walter Riml
- Edited by: Paula Dvorak; Leontine Klicka
- Music by: Nico Dostal
- Production companies: Nova-Film; Wien-Film
- Distributed by: Neue Filmverleih
- Release date: 4 August 1950
- Running time: 107 minutes
- Country: Austria
- Language: German

Child of the Danube (German: Kind der Donau) is a 1950 Austrian musical film directed by Georg Jacoby and starring Marika Rökk, Fred Liewehr and Harry Fuß. It was one of a cycle of popular musicals made by Jacoby and Rökk. The film was shot using Agfacolor at the Soviet-controlled Rosenhügel Studios in Vienna. Location shooting took place around Linz on the River Danube. The film's sets were designed by the art director Julius von Borsody.

== Plot ==
Three friends, the writer Georg and his friends Heinrich and Oskar, travel along the Danube in search of summer accommodation. After several unsuccessful attempts, Georg moves on to an apparently abandoned riverboat. He soon discovers that it belongs to Marika, a young singer who lives there. Meanwhile, Heinrich and Oskar, a songwriter and stage designer, decide to help Marika launch a career.

Georg secretly takes a night job at a newspaper to earn money to restore the boat so that Marika can travel the Danube on it again. Heinrich and Oskar also try to promote her as a performer. When a theater director cancels auditions because of a theater crisis, Marika and the rejected performers form their own theatre company and stage a production in an old amphitheatre. They create the costumes and sets themselves, and the first performance sells out.

Because Georg works at night and sleeps during the day, he knows nothing about the production. A misunderstanding involving a female colleague causes tensions between him and Marika. When Georg's editor offers him a series of articles about life aboard a Danube riverboat and agrees to finance the boat's restoration and running costs, he expects Marika to join him. She refuses, unwilling to leave the theater company, and they separate during a thunderstorm. A lightning strike then destroys the theater.

After reading about the disaster in the newspaper, Georg returns to Marika and persuades the troupe to continue at another theater. He publishes an article appealing for support, and the company eventually stages its play in a much larger theater. When the tenor is unable to perform, Georg takes his place. He also wrote the play. Although Marika is initially angry with him, they reconcile during the performance and become a couple.

== Partial cast ==
- Marika Rökk as Marika
- Fred Liewehr as Georg
- Harry Fuß as Heinrich
- Fritz Muliar as Oskar
- Joseph Egger as Christoph
- Annie Rosar as Frau Kovacs
- Helli Servi as Edith
- Nadja Tiller as actress
- Erich Auer as tenor
- Karl Skraup as editor

== Bibliography ==
- Bergfelder, Tim & Bock, Hans-Michael. The Concise Cinegraph: Encyclopedia of German. Berghahn Books, 2009.
