= Starfish (1952 film) =

1952 film

- Directed by: J.A. Hübler-Kahla
- Written by: Dr. Brand
- Starring: Eva Kerbler; Rudolf Carl; Edith Klinger
- Cinematography: Hanns König
- Edited by: Josef Juvancic
- Music by: Nico Dostal
- Production company: Universal-Film
- Distributed by: Union-Film; Progress Film (East Germany)
- Release date: 23 December 1952
- Running time: 93 minutes
- Country: Austria
- Language: German

Starfish (German: Seesterne) is a 1952 Austrian musical drama film directed by J.A. Hübler-Kahla and starring Eva Kerbler, Rudolf Carl and Edith Klinger. It was shot at the Rosenhügel Studios in Vienna in the Soviet sector of the city. The film's sets were designed by the art director Otto Pischinger.

== Synopsis ==
Peter, a young graphic artist, falls in love with factory worker Anna who runs a swimming club in her spare time. To try and win her over, he sets out to design a poster advertising the club.

== Cast ==
- Eva Kerbler as Anna
- Franz Messner as Peter
- Edith Klinger as Susi
- Pepi Glöckner-Kramer asMutter Riedl
- Rudolf Carl as Merz
- Fritz Eckhardt as Weber
- Karl Skraup as Der König von Vineta
- Richard Eybner as Finanzminister von Vineta
- Walter Regelsberger as Walter

== Reception ==
In an article regarding the Wien-Film Studios in the post-1945 era, Die Tageszeitung wrote: “Yet, even during this period, a veritable gem was created—and it is, naturally, the studio’s production maudite; for under such circumstances, truth is found only in excess. Seesterne (1952), by Johannes Alexander Hübler-Kahla, effortlessly blew past every production guideline—exceeding both its budget and its shooting schedule. The result was a revue film featuring a story sharpened by propaganda: a working-class synchronized swimming club shows their nasty corporate boss just what proletarian solidarity is capable of achieving. Aesthetically, Seesterne reveled in a pastel-hued pop pastiche. Hübler-Kahla’s film was a fiasco with both the press and the public; only today—within the context of contemporary pop discourse—can it be truly appreciated.”

Filmdienst was more negative, writing: “An unimaginative and undemanding aquatic revue film."

== Bibliography ==
- Fritsche, Maria (2013-05-01). Homemade Men in Postwar Austrian Cinema: Nationhood, Genre and Masculinity. Berghahn Books. ISBN 978-0-85745-946-6.
