= City Park (1951 film) =

1951 film

- Directed by: Hubert Marischka
- Written by: Frank Filip; Hubert Marischka; Hans Schubert (play)
- Produced by: Eduard Hoesch
- Starring: Annie Rosar; Peter Czejke; Erik Frey
- Cinematography: Walter Riml
- Edited by: Leopoldine Pokorny
- Music by: Frank Filip
- Production companies: Berna-Filmproduktion; Donau-Film Wien
- Release date: 13 March 1951
- Running time: 99 minutes
- Country: Austria
- Language: German

City Park (German: Stadtpark) is a 1951 Austrian comedy drama film directed by Hubert Marischka and starring Annie Rosar, Peter Czejke and Erik Frey.

The film's art direction was by Otto Pischinger. It was shot at the Sievering Studios in Vienna and on location around the city.

== Cast ==
- Annie Rosar as Anna Wawruschka
- Peter Czejke as Peter
- Erik Frey as Herbert Berger
- Friedl Loor as Alice Berger
- Fritz Imhoff as Lorenz Hofstetter
- Rudolf Carl as Gruber Würstelmann
- Ida Krottendorf as Franziska Berger
- Franz Marischka as Rudolf
- Hilde Sochor
- Hugo Gottschlich
- Auguste Pünkösdy
- Otto Treßler
- Karl Ehmann
- Carl Bosse
- Traute Servi
- Heinz Conrads
- Erich Dörner
- Karl Kalwoda
- Franz Schier

== Bibliography ==
- Fritsche, Maria. Homemade Men in Postwar Austrian Cinema: Nationhood, Genre and Masculinity. Berghahn Books, 2013.
