= Albin Skoda =

Austrian actor

- Born: 29 September 1909; Vienna, Austro-Hungarian Empire
- Died: 22 September 1961 (aged 51); Vienna, Austria
- Occupation: Actor
- Years active: 1934–1961 (film)

Albin Skoda (1909–1961) was an Austrian stage and film actor. He played the lead role of Adolf Hitler in the 1955 film The Last Ten Days by Georg Wilhelm Pabst. The same year he also appeared as the composer Antonio Salieri in Karl Hartl's Mozart.

The nephew of the actor Carl Skoda, he made his stage debut in 1918 as a child actor before attending the University of Music and Performing Arts Vienna.

== Selected filmography ==
- Love, Death and the Devil (1934)
- The Queen of the Landstrasse (1948)
- Archduke Johann's Great Love (1950)
- Spring on Ice (1951)
- Goetz von Berlichingen (1955)
- The Last Ten Days (1955)
- Mozart (1955)
- William Tell (1956)

== Bibliography ==
- Silberman, Marc. German Cinema: Texts in Context. Wayne State University Press, 1995.
