= Eva Kerbler =

Austrian actress

Eva Kerbler (born 1933) is an Austrian actress.

== Selected filmography ==
- Starfish (1952)
- Hannerl (1952)
- Cabaret (1954)
- Columbus Discovers Kraehwinkel (1954)
- Rosen für Bettina (1956)
- Santa Lucia (1956)
- And Who Is Kissing Me? (1956)
