= Franz Stoss =

Austrian actor (1909–1995)

- Born: 28 May 1909; Vienna; Austro-Hungarian Empire
- Died: 21 June 1995 (aged 86); Steinbach am Attersee, Upper Austria; Austria
- Occupation: Actor
- Years active: 1955 - 1989 (film)

Franz Stoss (28 May 1909 – 21 June 1995) was an Austrian stage. film and television actor. He also worked as a theatre director. Following the Second World War he worked at the re-opened Vienna Burgtheater.

== Selected filmography ==
- Sarajevo (1955)
- The Model Boy (1963)
- Condemned to Sin (1964)
- I Learned It from Father (1964)
- Trouble with Trixie (1972)
- Der Bockerer (1981)

== Bibliography ==
- Yates, W.E. Theatre in Vienna: A Critical History, 1776-1995. Cambridge University Press, 2005.
