= Fred Liewehr =

Austrian actor

- Born: 17 June 1909; Neutitschein, Austro-Hungarian Empire
- Died: 19 July 1993 (aged 84); Vienna, Austria
- Occupation: Actor
- Years active: 1935–1988 (film)

Fred Liewehr (1909–1993) was an Austrian stage and film actor.

== Partial filmography ==
- Jana, das Mädchen aus dem Böhmerwald (1935) - Michael
- Immortal Waltz (1939) - Johann Strauß Sohn
- Brüderlein fein (1942) - von Jaroszinsky
- Vienna Blood (1942) - Crown-Prince Ludwig von Bayern
- Late Love (1943) - von Pioletti
- The Angel with the Trumpet (1948) - Kronprinz Rudolf
- Viennese Girls (1949) - John Cross
- Child of the Danube (1950) - Georg
- Maria Theresa (1951) - Franz I.
- 1. April 2000 (1952)
- Grandstand for General Staff (1953) - Erzherzog Karl Viktor
- Das Licht der Liebe (1954) - Kammersänger
- Victoria in Dover (1954) - König Leopold von Belgien
- Goetz von Berlichingen (1955) - Franz von Sickingen
- Im Prater blüh’n wieder die Bäume (1958) - Baron Lazi Köröshazi
- Embezzled Heaven (1958) - Leopold Argan
- Maria Stuart (1959)
- Don Carlos (1960) - Marquis von Posa
- Gustav Adolf's Page (1960) - Octavio Piccolomini
- Wedding Night in Paradise (1962) - Otto Roeders, Regines Vater
- Help, My Bride Steals (1964) - Generaldirektor Schöner, Elisabeths Vater
- An der Donau, wenn der Wein blüht (1965)
- Aunt Frieda (1965) - Prinzregent
- Onkel Filser – Allerneueste Lausbubengeschichten (1966) - Prinzregent
- When Ludwig Goes on Manoeuvres (1967) - Prinzregent Luitpold (uncredited)
- Abenteuer eines Sommers (1973) - Großvater
- Das Land des Lächelns (1974) - Graf Lichtenfels
- Anna (1988) - Sänger 'Feuerwerk' (final film role)

== Bibliography ==
- Robert von Dassanowsky. Austrian Cinema: A History. McFarland, 2005.
