= Let the Sun Shine Again =

1955 film

- Directed by: Hubert Marischka
- Written by: Hans Fritz Beckmann; Franz Marischka
- Starring: Hans Holt; Hertha Feiler; Cornelia Froboess
- Cinematography: Károly Kurzmayer
- Edited by: Friedel Schier
- Music by: Hans Carste; Gerhard Froboess
- Production companies: Atlantic-Filmverleih; Lucerna-Film
- Distributed by: Atlantic-Filmverleih; Universal-Film
- Release date: 25 August 1955
- Running time: 90 minutes
- Countries: Austria; West Germany
- Language: German

Let the Sun Shine Again (German: Lass die Sonne wieder scheinen) is a 1955 Austrian-West German musical comedy film directed by Hubert Marischka and starring Hans Holt, Hertha Feiler and Cornelia Froboess. Shooting took place in the Triglav studios in Ljubljana and on location at the resorts of Opatija and Portorož on the Adriatic. The film's sets were designed by the art director Mirko Lipuzic.

== Cast ==
- Hans Holt as Herbert Werner
- Hertha Feiler as Mira
- Cornelia Froboess as Angelika
- Hans Leibelt as Dr. Retlinger
- Erich Scholz as Georg
- Claire Reigbert as Frau Bröselmaier
- Walter Holten as Rechtsanwalt
- Alice Graf as Friedel Clausen
- Robert Lembke as Quizmaster
- Stane Sever as Teacher

== Bibliography ==
- Bock, Hans-Michael & Bergfelder, Tim. The Concise Cinegraph: Encyclopaedia of German Cinema. Berghahn Books, 2009.
- Fritsche, Maria. Homemade Men in Postwar Austrian Cinema: Nationhood, Genre and Masculinity. Berghahn Books, 2013.
- Von Dassanowsky, Robert. Austrian Cinema: A History. McFarland, 2005.
- Wagnleitner, Reinhold. Coca-Colonization and the Cold War: The Cultural Mission of the United States in Austria After the Second World War. Univ of North Carolina Press, 2000.
