= Vienna Waltzes (film) =

- Directed by: Emil E. Reinert
- Written by: Jacques Companéez; Hans Gustl Kernmayr; Emil E. Reinert; Benno Vigny
- Produced by: Karl Ehrlich
- Starring: Marte Harell; Anton Walbrook; Lilly Stepanek
- Cinematography: Günther Anders; Hannes Staudinger
- Edited by: Henny Brünsch
- Music by: Willy Schmidt-Gentner
- Production company: Cordial-Film
- Distributed by: Schorcht Filmverleih (W.Germany)
- Release date: 17 June 1951
- Running time: 102 minutes
- Country: Austria
- Language: German

Vienna Waltzes (German: Wiener Walzer) is a 1951 Austrian historical musical drama film directed by Emil E. Reinert and starring Marte Harell, Anton Walbrook and Lilly Stepanek. It is also known by the alternative title of Vienna Dances.

It portrays the life of the composer Johann Strauss. The film's sets were designed by the art director Otto Niedermoser.

== Cast ==
- Marte Harell as Millie Trampusch
- Anton Walbrook as Johann Strauss Senior
- Lilly Stepanek as Anna Strauss
- Fritz Imhoff as Oberstrasser
- Lotte Lang as Frau Riesner
- Eva Leiter as Resi
- Karl Kalwoda as Amon
- Richard Eybner as Haslinger
- Erik Frey as Fürst Metternich
- Milan von Kamare
- Viktor Braun as Sedlnitzky, Polizeipräsident
- Franz Böheim as Sein Adjutant
- Oskar Wegrostek as Wirt des Konzertlokales 'Zu den zwei Täubchen'
- Ludwig Blaha as Wirt des Gasthauses 'Sperl'
- Heinrich Ortmayer as Italienischer Manager
- Peter Czejke
- Friedl Czepa
- Hugo Gottschlich
- Leopold Rudolf
- Albert Truby

== Bibliography ==
- Fritsche, Maria. Homemade Men in Postwar Austrian Cinema: Nationhood, Genre and Masculinity. Berghahn Books, 2013.
