= Goetz von Berlichingen (film) =

- Directed by: Alfred Stöger
- Written by: Johann Wolfgang von Goethe (play)
- Produced by: Alfred Stöger
- Starring: Ewald Balser; Auguste Pünkösdy; Raoul Aslan
- Cinematography: Sepp Ketterer; Károly Kurzmayer; Anton Pucher; Walter Tuch; Fritz von Friedl
- Music by: Walter Heydrich
- Production companies: Thalia-Film; Wiener Mundus-Film
- Distributed by: Union Film Wien
- Release date: 14 October 1955
- Running time: 87 minutes
- Country: Austria
- Language: German

Goetz von Berlichingen is a 1955 Austrian historical adventure film directed by Alfred Stöger and starring Ewald Balser, Auguste Pünkösdy and Raoul Aslan. It is a filmed version of the 1773 play Götz von Berlichingen by Johann Wolfgang von Goethe. It was shot at the Burgtheater in Vienna.

== Cast ==
- Ewald Balser as Götz von Berlichingen
- Auguste Pünkösdy as Elisabeth, seine Frau
- Hilde Mikulicz as Maria, seine Schwester
- Raoul Aslan as Kaiser Maximilian
- Albin Skoda as Adelbert von Weislingen
- Judith Holzmeister as Adelheid von Walldorf
- Fred Liewehr as Franz von Sickingen
- Ulrich Bettac as Bischof von Bamberg
- Felix Steinboeck as Bruder Martin
- Philipp von Zeska as Kaiserlicher Rat
- Stefan Skodler as Hans von Selbitz
- Paul Pranger as Ein Nürnberger Kaufmann
- Helmut Janatsch as Franz
- Alfons Lipp as Georg
- Fred Hennings as Lerse

== Bibliography ==
- Goble, Alan. The Complete Index to Literary Sources in Film. Walter de Gruyter, 1999.
