= Bonus on Death =

1950 film

- Judith Holzmeister and Siegfried Breuer
- Directed by: Curd Jürgens
- Written by: Kurt Heuser; Curd Jürgens
- Starring: Judith Holzmeister; Werner Krauss; Siegfried Breuer
- Cinematography: Günther Anders; Hannes Staudinger
- Music by: Willy Schmidt-Gentner
- Production company: Alpen Film
- Distributed by: Oefram Filmgesellschaft
- Release date: 13 January 1950
- Running time: 78 minutes
- Country: Austria
- Language: German

Bonus on Death (German: Prämien auf den Tod) is a 1950 Austrian crime film directed by Curd Jürgens and starring Judith Holzmeister, Werner Krauss and Siegfried Breuer. One of a handful of Austrian crime films made during the post-war period, it was not particularly successful at the box office.

The film's sets were designed by Isabella Schlichting and Werner Schlichting.

== Synopsis ==
Short of money, a man creates a scam where he takes out life insurance policies on fake identities, then pretends they have died in order to collect the payouts.

== Cast ==
- Judith Holzmeister as Evelyn Biaggi
- Werner Krauss as Dr. Schmidt
- Siegfried Breuer as Peter Lissen - Versicherungsagent
- Felix Steinboeck as Kako, Klavierspieler
- Curd Jürgens as Gunarson, Operntenor
- Josef Meinrad as Matrose
- Gisele Wilke as Cleo, Hafenwirtin
- Edith Mill as Kellnerin
- Melanie Horeschowsky as Tilla, Lissens Quartierfrau
- Hermann Thimig as Muschel, Hafensinspektor
- Karl Günther
- Hermann Erhardt
- Ilse Trenker
- Gusti Wolf
- Iván Petrovich
- Herta Baumann
- Eugen Eisenlohr
- Liselotte Gerhard
- Hans Graff
- Martha Hartmann
- Friedrich Kutschera
- Hans Mraschner
- Mimi Stelzer
- Ernst Therwal

== Bibliography ==
- Fritsche, Maria. Homemade Men in Postwar Austrian Cinema: Nationhood, Genre and Masculinity. Berghahn Books, 2013.
