= Vienna, City of My Dreams (1957 film) =

- Erika Remberg, Hans Holt, Paul Hörbiger, Adrian Hoven and Hertha Feiler (left to right)
- Directed by: Willi Forst
- Written by: Willi Forst; Kurt Nachmann; Hans Rameau (novella)
- Produced by: Herbert Gruber
- Starring: Adrian Hoven; Erika Remberg; Hertha Feiler
- Cinematography: Günther Anders
- Edited by: Herma Sandtner
- Music by: Norbert Pawlicki; Rudolf Sieczyński; Alfred Uhl
- Production companies: Lux-Film Wien; Sascha-Verleih
- Distributed by: Herzog Filmverleih
- Release date: 19 December 1957
- Running time: 104 minutes
- Country: Austria
- Language: German

Vienna, City of My Dreams (German: Wien, du Stadt meiner Träume) is a 1957 Austrian musical comedy film directed by Willi Forst and starring Adrian Hoven, Erika Remberg and Hertha Feiler. The film's sets were designed by the art directors Isabella Schlichting and Werner Schlichting.

== Cast ==
- Adrian Hoven as Peter Lehnert, Musikprofessor
- Erika Remberg as Sandra, Prinzessin von Alanien
- Hertha Feiler as Elisabeth Seyboldt
- Hans Holt as Alexander I., König von Alanien
- Paul Hörbiger as Vater Lehnert
- Alma Seidler as Mutter Lehnert
- Oskar Sima as von Trotum - Gesandter
- Jane Tilden as Klara von Trotum
- Richard Romanowsky as Katzelseder - Sektionschef
- Lilly Stepanek as Frau von Waldegg
- Erwin Strahl as Mirko, ein alanischer Emissär
- Hannes Schiel as Oberstleutnant Morosos
- Peter Brand as Chauffeur der Gesandtschaft
- Alfred Böhm as Polizist
- Otto Fassler as Konzertmeister
- Peter Fröhlich as Reporter
- Peter Gerhard as Empfangschef
- Hugo Gottschlich as Bauarbeiter
- Fred Hennings as Polizeipräsident
- Fritz Imhoff
- Herbert Kersten as Sekretär der Gesandtschaft
- Fritz Muliar as Spöttischer Passant
- Auguste Ripper as Blumenfrau
- Walter Simmerl as Bezechter
- Otto Treßler as Fürst Vitus

== Bibliography ==
- Reimer, Robert C. & Reimer, Carol J. The A to Z of German Cinema. Scarecrow Press, 2010. ISBN 978-0810876118
