= Auguste Pünkösdy =

Austrian actress

- Born: 28 August 1890; Vienna, Austro-Hungarian Empire
- Died: 1 October 1967 (aged 77); Vienna, Austria
- Other name: Auguste Schirokauer-Pünkösdy
- Occupation: Actress
- Years active: 1917-1962 (film)

Auguste Pünkösdy (1890–1967) was an Austrian stage and film actress.

== Selected filmography ==
- The Giant's Fist (1917)
- Alkohol (1919)
- Circus Saran (1935)
- Little Mother (1935)
- Confetti (1936)
- Vienna 1910 (1943)
- Late Love (1943)
- A Salzburg Comedy (1943)
- A Man Like Maximilian (1945)
- Eroica (1949)
- Two Times Lotte (1950)
- Cordula (1950)
- Archduke Johann's Great Love (1950)
- Verklungenes Wien (1951)
- City Park (1951)
- Goetz von Berlichingen (1955)

== Bibliography ==
- John T. Soister. Conrad Veidt on Screen: A Comprehensive Illustrated Filmography. McFarland, 2002.
