= Hans-Joachim Kulenkampff =

German actor (1921–1998)

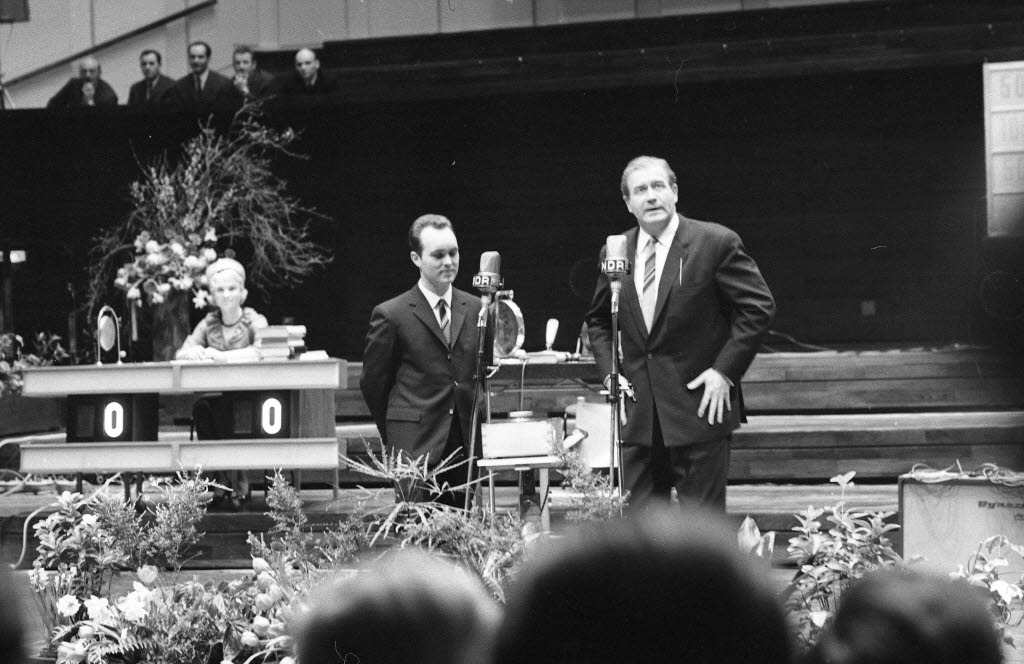
Hans-Joachim Kulenkampff (right), 1966.

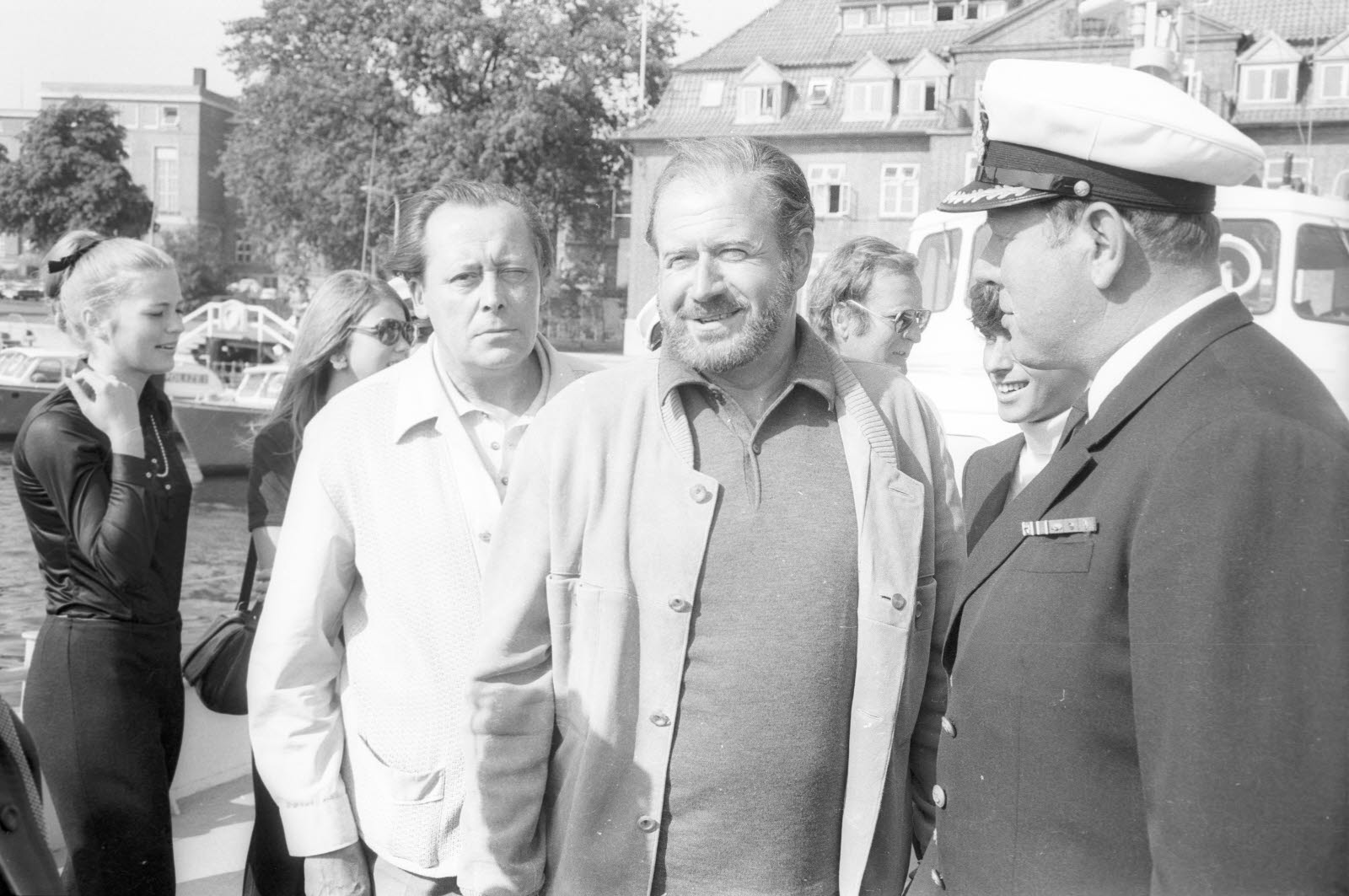
Hans-Joachim Kulenkampff (middle), 1969.

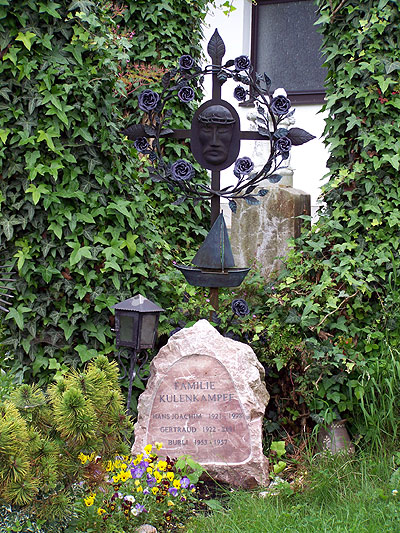
Tomb in Frauenstein

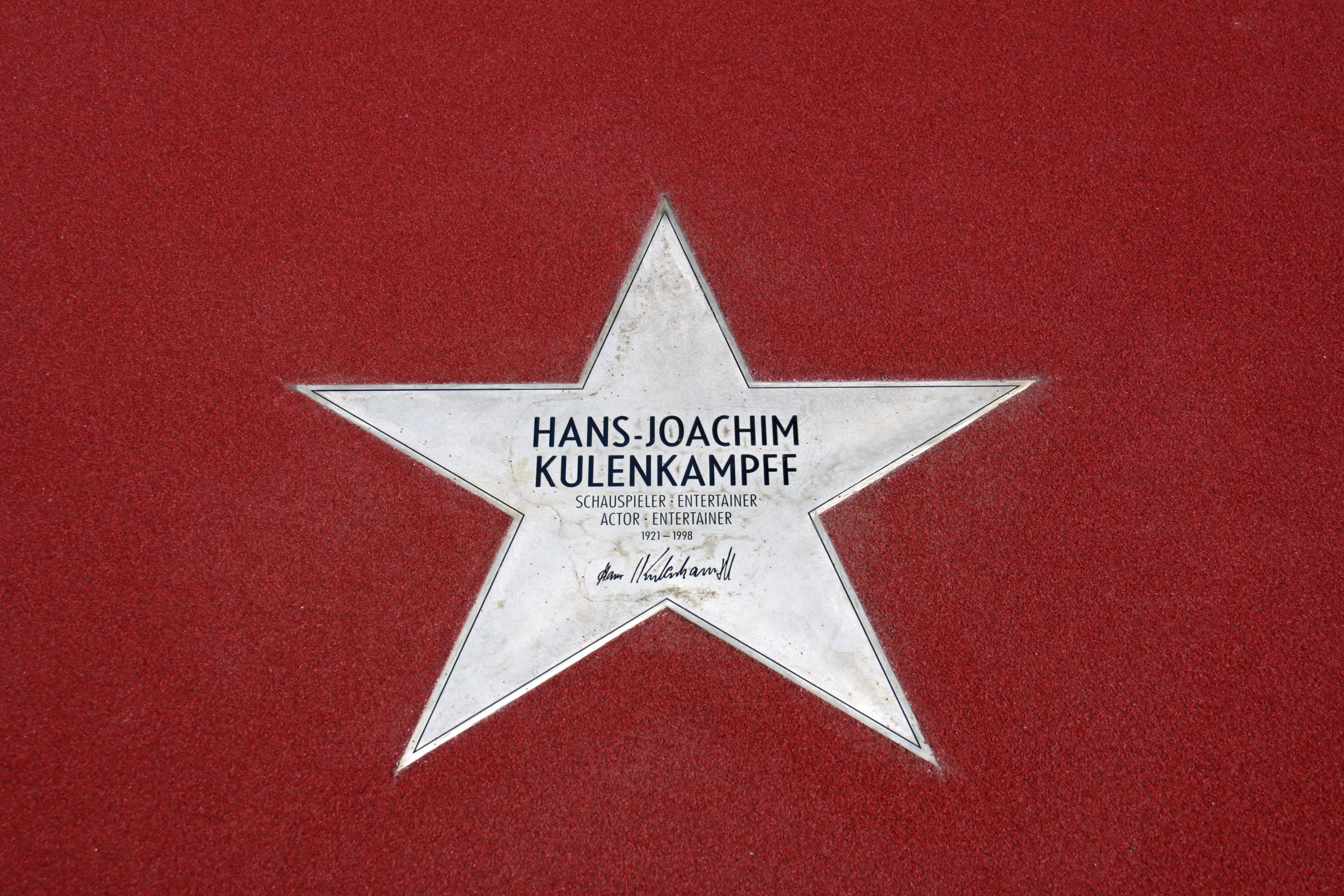
Star of Hans-Joachim Kulenkampff on Boulevard der Stars in Berlin

Hans-Joachim Kulenkampff, nickname Kuli (27 April 1921 in Bremen – 14 August 1998 in Seeham) was a German actor and TV host, remembered mainly as host of Einer wird gewinnen, a quiz show that ran from 1964 to 1987.

In 1967, he hosted Miss Germany pageant

== Selected filmography ==
- Bonjour Kathrin (1956) - Columbus
- Immer die Radfahrer (1958) - Ulrich Salandt
- Immer die Mädchen (1959) - Dr. Clausen
- Kein Mann zum Heiraten (1959) - Wolf Kruse
- Sooo nicht, meine Herren! (1960) - John Morton, fröhlicher junger Mann aus Texas + Franz Huber, Musikalienhändler
- Three Men in a Boat (1961) - Harry Berg
- Dr. Fabian: Laughing Is the Best Medicine (1969) - Dr. med. Paul Fabian
- Starke Zeiten (1988) - Hans-Joachim Jennings
