= No Sin on the Alpine Pastures (1950 film) =

1952 film

- East German theatrical release poster
- Directed by: Franz Antel
- Written by: Franz Antel; Aldo von Pinelli
- Produced by: Eduard Hoesch
- Starring: Maria Andergast; Inge Egger; Rudolf Carl
- Cinematography: Hans Heinz Theyer
- Music by: Hans Lang
- Production companies: Berna Filmproduktion; Donau-Film Wien
- Distributed by: Sascha-Film; Union-Film (West Germany); Progress Film (East Germany)
- Release date: 17 October 1950
- Running time: 92 minutes
- Country: Austria
- Language: German

No Sin on the Alpine Pastures (German: Auf der Alm, da gibt's ka Sünd) is a 1950 Austrian comedy film directed by Franz Antel and starring Maria Andergast, Inge Egger and Rudolf Carl.

The film's sets were designed by the art director Gustav Abel.

== Cast ==
- Maria Andergast as Kitty Schröder, Fürsorgeschwester
- Inge Egger as Inge Thaller, Hotelsekretärin
- Rudolf Carl as August Pfundhammer, Gastwirt
- Susi Nicoletti as Annerl, seine Tochter
- Karl Skraup as Ignaz Nagler, Bürgermeister
- Annie Rosar as Maria, seine Frau
- Alexander Trojan as Hans, deren Sohn
- Joseph Egger as Der Großvater
- Hans Richter as Paul Wittke, Fotoreporter
- Ludwig Schmidseder as Max Obermayer, Wortberichterstatter
- Peter Hey as Dr.Traugott Selig
- Ida Krottendorf as Zenzi, Magd
- Isulinde Reuser as Eva

== Bibliography ==
- Fritsche, Maria. Homemade Men in Postwar Austrian Cinema: Nationhood, Genre and Masculinity. Berghahn Books, 2013.
