= Annie Rosar =

Austrian actress

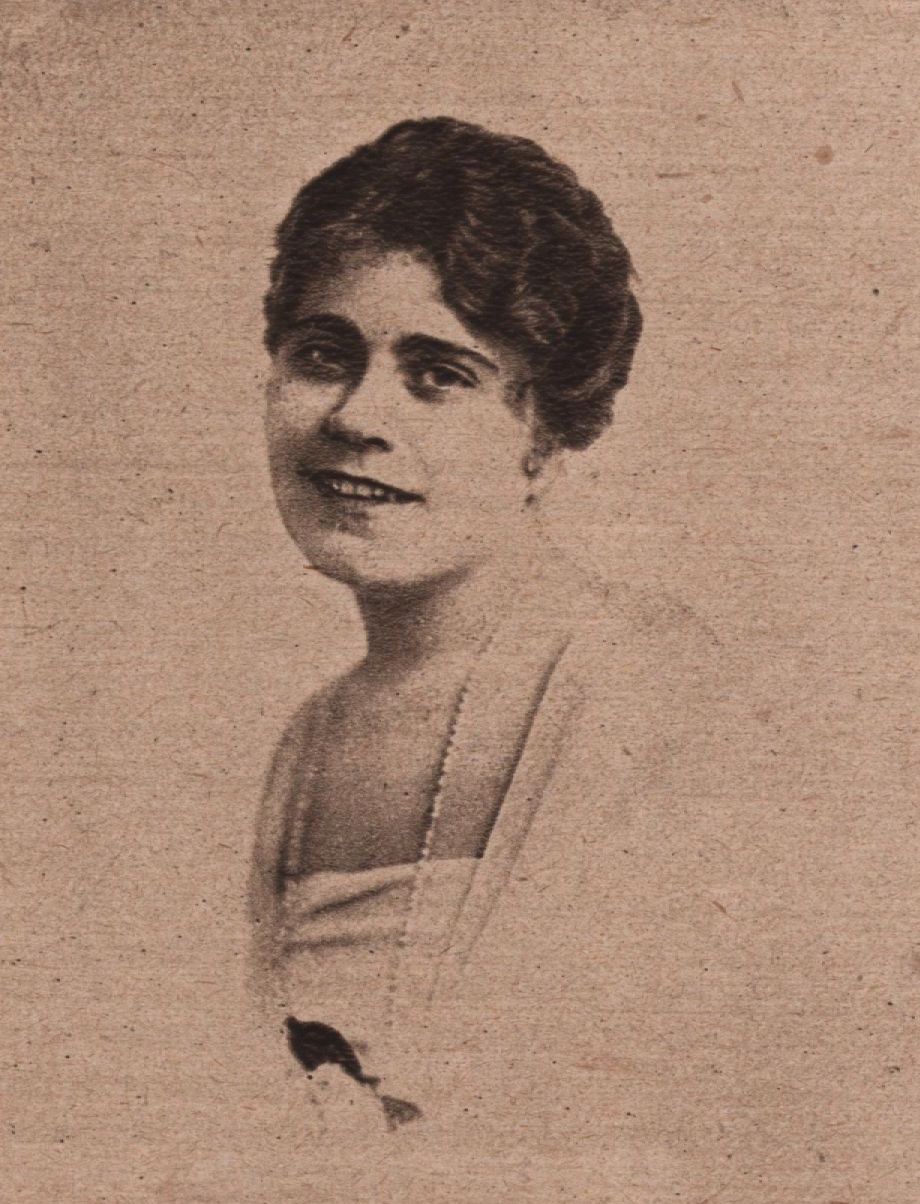
- Publicity photo, 1917
- Born: 17 May 1888; Vienna, Austria-Hungary
- Died: 5 August 1963 (aged 75); Vienna, Austria
- Occupation: Actor
- Years active: 1910–1963
- Spouse(s): Max Walser (1907); Franz Rebiczek (1930); Ladislaus Fuchs
- Awards: Best Actor Award at Cork Film Festival (1958) for Embezzled Heaven; Appointment as "Popular Actress" (1958); Austrian Cross of Honour for Science and Art (1961); Bambi Award (1961) for contribution to German film industry

Annie Rosar (17 May 1888 – 5 August 1963) was an Austrian stage and film actress who is best remembered today for her appearances in many Austrian comedy films from the 1930s to the early 1960s. In those movies, she was frequently cast in the comic roles of nagging wife (for example in Ungeküsst soll man nicht schlafen gehn opposite Hans Moser), evil mother-in-law, or understanding housekeeper, whether in rural (Heimatfilme) or urban settings. She occasionally also appeared in serious films, including her cameo performance as the porter's wife in The Third Man (1949), and in Embezzled Heaven based on the novel by Franz Werfel in 1958.

== Biography ==
Annie Rosar was born in Vienna into a farming family based in Orth an der Donau, near Vienna. Her father Michael Rosar (1850–1927) worked as a conductor on the Vienna tram network.

Having finished grammar school (Gymnasium), Rosar attended the University of Music and Performing Arts and made her stage debut in the Vienna Prater under director Josef Jarno in 1910. One year later she joined the Munich Munich Schauspielhaus ensemble under Otto Falckenberg and subsequently went to Berlin and Hamburg. On her return to Vienna, she had engagements at the Burgtheater (1917–23), the Theater in der Josefstadt (1925–38), where she worked with Max Reinhardt, and the Volkstheater (1939–42, 1947–51).

Rosar initially appeared in classical roles, however, in her advanced years she embodied resolute Viennese women in numerous comedies. She appeared in film as early as in 1919; her popularity was boosted with the development of sound films. After the World War II, Rosar concentrated on film, radio and television work, starring in more than 100 movies during her acting career.

In 1907 Rosar married a Swiss businessman and moved with him to Milan, Italy. After her divorce she remarried in 1930 but was divorced again. Her only son, by her first marriage, was killed in 1943 at the Eastern Front in the Second World War.

Annie Rosar died in Vienna. She is buried in an Ehrengrab in the Zentralfriedhof.

== Selected filmography ==
- Father Radetzky (1929)
- The Deed of Andreas Harmer (1930)
- Adventures on the Lido (1933)
- Spring Parade (1934)
- The Young Baron Neuhaus (1934)
- The World's in Love (1935)
- Everything for the Company (1935)
- Little Mother (1935)
- Immortal Melodies (1935)
- Romance (1936)
- Ungeküsst soll man nicht schlafen gehn (1936)
- The Jumping Jack (1938)
- A Mother's Love (1939)
- My Daughter Lives in Vienna (1940)
- Die goldene Stadt (1941)
- Whom the Gods Love (1942)
- Gabriele Dambrone (1943)
- The Song of the Nightingale (1944)
- Why Are You Lying, Elisabeth? (1944)
- The Millionaire (1947)
- Anni (1948)
- After the Storm (1948)
- The Third Man (1949) as the porter's wife
- Child of the Danube (1950)
- The Fourth Commandment (1950)
- No Sin on the Alpine Pastures (1950)
- City Park (1951)
- Hello Porter (1952)
- Vanished Melody (1952)
- The Mine Foreman (1952)
- Shame on You, Brigitte! (1952)
- The Devil Makes Three (1952)
- Anna Louise and Anton (1953)
- Don't Forget Love (1953)
- Mask in Blue (1953)
- A Night in Venice (1953)
- Men at a Dangerous Age (1954)
- A Woman of Today (1954)
- When the Alpine Roses Bloom (1955)
- Mozart (1955)
- The Blacksmith of St. Bartholomae (1955)
- I Often Think of Piroschka (1955)
- One Woman Is Not Enough? (1955)
- The Mistress of Solderhof (1955)
- Marriage Sanitarium (1955)
- Your Life Guards (1955)
- The Priest from Kirchfeld (1955)
- Beloved Corinna (1956)
- Nina (1956)
- As Long as the Roses Bloom (1956)
- The Tour Guide of Lisbon (1956)
- And Lead Us Not Into Temptation (1957)
- Mikosch, the Pride of the Company (1958)
- That Won't Keep a Sailor Down (1958)
- A Song Goes Round the World (1958)
- Embezzled Heaven (1958)
- For the First Time (1959)
- When the Bells Sound Clearly (1959)
- Twenty Brave Men (1960)
- Drei Liebesbriefe aus Tirol (1962)
- Romance in Venice (1962)
