= Rudolf Prack =

Austrian actor (1905–1981)

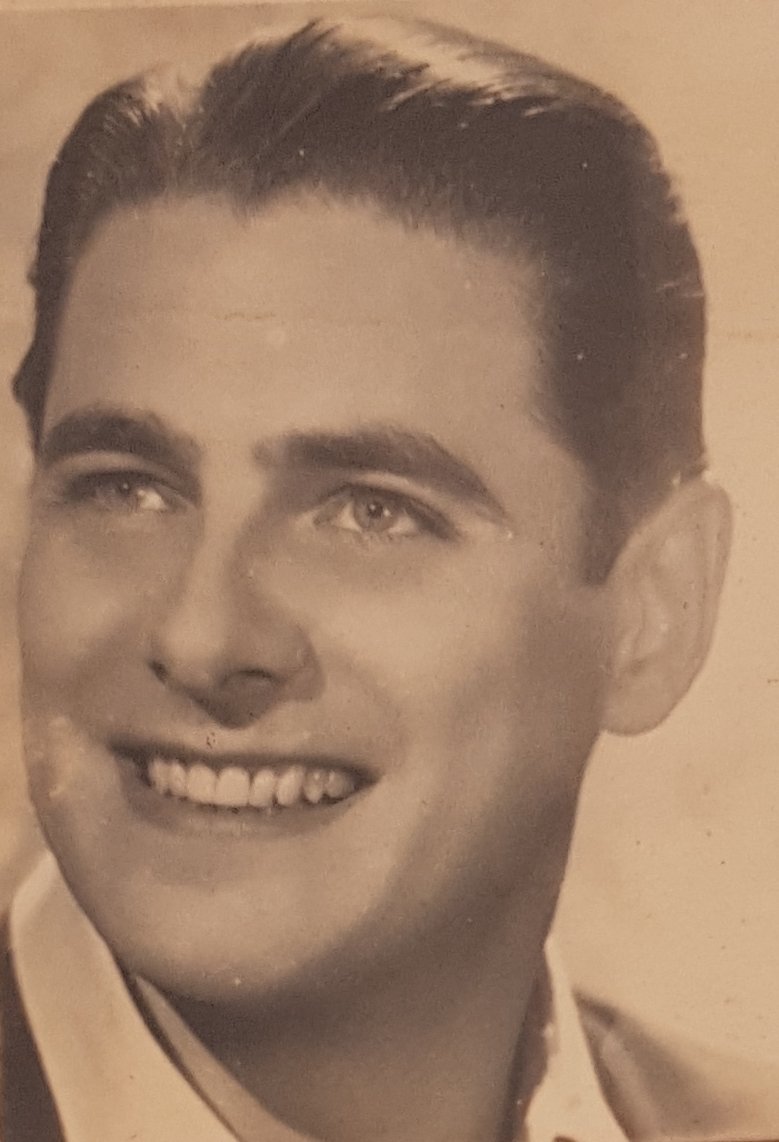
- Born: Rudolf Amon Prack; 2 August 1905; Vienna, Austria-Hungary
- Died: 2 December 1981 (aged 76); Vienna, Austria
- Occupation: Film actor
- Years active: 1937–1977

Rudolf Amon Prack (2 August 1905 – 2 December 1981) was an Austrian film actor.

== Selected filmography ==
- Florentine (1937)
- Prinzessin Sissy (1939) - Prince Luitpold
- A Mother's Love (1939) - Felix Pirlinger - 1922
- Krambambuli (1940) - Thomas Werndl
- Ein Leben lang (1940) - Franz Hofbauer
- Beloved Augustin (1940) - Podl Schauerhuber, Musikant
- Spähtrupp Hallgarten (1941) - Oberjäger Unterkirchner
- Die heimlichen Bräute (1942) - Peter Leidinger
- The Golden City (1942) - Großknecht Thomas - Annas Verlobte
- The Big Number (1943) - Peter Stoll
- The Eternal Tone (1943) - Berthold Buchner
- Die unheimliche Wandlung des Axel Roscher (1943) - Zollassistent Alex Roscher
- Journey into the Past (1943) - Michael BrantnerLehrer
- Aufruhr der Herzen (1944) - Franz Atzinger
- Orient Express (1944) - Franz Schulz
- Leuchtende Schatten (1945)
- Der weite Weg (1946) - Franz Manhardt
- Glaube an mich (1946) - Hans Baumann
- Liebe nach Noten (1947) - Frank Ewert
- Zyankali (1948) - Polizeikommissar Tanner
- The Queen of the Landstrasse (1948) - Michael von Dornberg
- Everything Will Be Better in the Morning (1948) - Thomas Schott, Sportberichterstatter
- Fregola (1948) - Santos
- A Heart Beats for You (1949) - Martin Hellwanger, Bauer
- Heimliches Rendezvous (1949) - Dr. Stefan Böhme
- By a Nose (1949) - Willy Lohmeyer, berühmter 6-Tage Rennfahrer
- The Reluctant Maharaja (1950) - Jonny Williams - Sekretär des Maharadschas
- The Black Forest Girl (1950) - Hans Hauser - ein Maler
- Mädchen mit Beziehungen (1950) - Peter Hauff
- The Lady in Black (1951) - Andreas Osterwald
- Engel im Abendkleid (1951)
- Johannes und die 13 Schönheitsköniginnen (1951) - Johannes Burghoff, genannt Jean
- The Heath Is Green (1951) - Walter Rainer - Förster
- The Lady in Black (1951) - Nils Corbett
- The Thief of Bagdad (1952) - Achmed
- A Thousand Red Roses Bloom (1952) - Hannes Frings
- Holiday From Myself (1952) - George B. Stefenson
- When the Heath Dreams at Night (1952) - Peter Gelius, Sprengmeister
- Shooting Stars (1952) - Werner Nordhaus
- Come Back (1953) - Martin Larsen
- The Emperor Waltz (1953) - Erzherzog Ludwig
- When The Village Music Plays on Sunday Nights (1953) - Martin
- The Private Secretary (1953) - Direktor Erich Delbrück
- The Big Star Parade (1954) - Dr. Georg Roberts
- Ball at the Savoy (1955) - Paul Alexander
- Heimatland (1955) - Thomas Heimberg
- The Congress Dances (1955) - Czar Alexander I / Uralsky
- Crown Prince Rudolph's Last Love (1956) - Kronprinz Rudolf
- Dany, bitte schreiben Sie (1956) - Hannes Pratt
- Emperor's Ball (1956) - Reichsgraf Georg von Hohenegg
- Roter Mohn (1956) - Stefan von Reiffenberg
- The Simple Girl (1957) - Thomas Krauss
- Heimweh... dort wo die Blumen blüh'n (1957) - Ingenieur Robert Wegner
- Der Page vom Palast-Hotel (1958)
- Die Landärztin vom Tegernsee (1958) - Dr. Rinner - Tierarzt
- The Priest and the Girl (1958) - Walter Hartwig
- Eine Reise ins Glück (1958) - Carlo
- What a Woman Dreams of in Springtime (1959) - Johannes Brandt
- Aus dem Tagebuch eines Frauenarztes (1959) - Chefarzt Dr. Brückner
- Du bist wunderbar (1959) - Kapitän Chris Behrens
- Ein Herz braucht Liebe (1960)
- The Young Sinner (1960) - Werner Ortmann
- Frau Irene Besser (1961)
- Vertauschtes Leben (1961) - Alexander Bertram
- Mariandl (1961) - Hofrat Franz Geiger
- Mariandl's Homecoming (1962) - Hofrat Franz Geiger
- Schweik's Awkward Years (1964) - Major Ferdinand Hruschkowitz
- Holiday in St. Tropez (1964) - Robert Engelhard
- The Merry Wives of Tyrol (1964) - Musikverleger Karl-Heinz Busch
- Happy-End am Wörthersee (1964) - Johannes Petermann
- Call of the Forest (1965) - Ingenieur Prachner
- Heidi (1965) - Pfarrer
- Ein dreifach Hoch dem Sanitätsgefreiten Neumann (1969) - Erzherzog Rudolf
- Frau Wirtin bläst auch gern Trompete (1970) - Archduke
- Holidays in Tyrol (1971) - Dr. Madesperger
- Sie nannten ihn Krambambuli (1972) - Prof. Dr. Schott
- Wenn jeder Tag ein Sonntag wär (1973) - Raimund Anger
- The Hunter of Fall (1974) - Prinzregent
- Karl May (1974) - Sächsicher Justizminister
- Jesus von Ottakring (1976) - Major a.D.
- The Standard (1977) - Lakai - Kaiserlicher Diener im Hof
