= The Last Ten Days =

1955 film

- American film poster
- Directed by: G. W. Pabst
- Written by: Fritz Habeck; Michael A. Musmanno; Erich Maria Remarque
- Produced by: Carl Szokoll
- Starring: Albin Skoda; Oskar Werner; Lotte Tobisch
- Cinematography: Günther Anders
- Edited by: Herbert Taschner
- Music by: Erwin Halletz
- Production company: Cosmopol-Film
- Distributed by: Cosmopol-Film; Columbia Film
- Release date: 14 April 1955
- Running time: 113 minutes
- Countries: Austria; West Germany
- Language: German

The Last Ten Days (German: Der letzte Akt, The Final Act) is a 1955 Austrian-West German drama film directed by G. W. Pabst. It was the first film in post-World War II Germany to feature the character of Adolf Hitler. It follows him and others in what were the last days of the Third Reich.

It was shot at the Sievering Studios in Vienna and at Baden bei Wien. The film's sets were designed by the art directors Otto Pischinger, Wolf Witzemann and Werner Schlichting.

== Cast ==
- Albin Skoda as Adolf Hitler
- Oskar Werner as Hauptmann Wüst
- Lotte Tobisch as Eva Braun
- Willy Krause as Joseph Goebbels
- Erich Stuckmann as Heinrich Himmler
- Erland Erlandsen as Albert Speer
- Curt Eilers as Martin Bormann
- Leopold Hainisch as Generalfeldmarschall Wilhelm Keitel
- Otto Schmöle as Generaloberst Alfred Jodl
- Herbert Herbe as General Hans Krebs
- Hannes Schiel as SS-Obersturmbannführer Otto Günsche
- Erik Frey as General Wilhelm Burgdorf
- Otto Wögerer as Generalfeldmarschall Robert Ritter von Greim
- Martha Wallner as Frieda, Kantineurin

== See also ==
- Hitler: The Last Ten Days, a 1973 film
- The Death of Adolf Hitler 1968 book by Soviet journalist Lev Bezymenski
- The Death of Adolf Hitler (Sunday Night Theatre episode) (1973), a British television film
- The Bunker (1981 film), a CBS television film
- Downfall (2004 film) German production
