= Maria Andergast =

German actress (1912–1995)

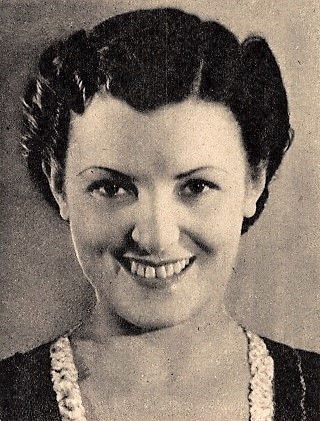
- Born: 4 June 1912; Brunnthal an der Alz, Germany
- Died: 14 February 1995 (aged 82); Vienna, Austria
- Occupation: Actress
- Years active: 1934–1974

Maria Andergast (4 June 1912 – 14 February 1995) was an Austrian singer and actress. She appeared in more than 60 films between 1934 and 1974.

== Selected filmography ==
- The Prodigal Son (1934)
- Last Stop (1935)
- My Life for Maria Isabella (1935)
- The Bird Seller (1935)
- Scandal at the Fledermaus (1936)
- His Daughter is Called Peter (1936)
- The Three Around Christine (1936)
- Three Girls for Schubert (1936)
- The Czar's Courier (1936)
- The Mystery of Betty Bonn (1938)
- Monika (1938)
- Immortal Waltz (1939)
- Her Private Secretary (1940)
- Der Herr im Haus (1940)
- Six Days of Leave (1941)
- The Big Game (1942)
- Der Hofrat Geiger (1947)
- No Sin on the Alpine Pastures (1950)
- The Midnight Venus (1951)
- Hello Porter (1952)
- The Landlady of Maria Wörth (1952)
- The Spendthrift (1953)
- The Bachelor Trap (1953)
- The Crazy Clinic (1954)
- When the Alpine Roses Bloom (1955)
- Emperor's Ball (1956)
- Engagement at Wolfgangsee (1956)
- Almenrausch and Edelweiss (1957)
- Stolen Heaven (1974)
