= Schönbrunn Studios =

Film studios located in Vienna

The Schönbrunn Studios were film studios located in the Austrian capital Vienna in the grounds of the Schönbrunn Palace. It took over the site of the old palm house, which had been replaced by the newer Palmenhaus Schönbrunn in the 1880s.

Established in 1920 during the silent era, it was one of the country's three main studios, along with the Sievering and Rosenhügel Studios. In 1946, during the Allied occupation of Austria after the Second World War, Britain and America handed Schönbrunn back to the control of the Austrian government while the Soviets continued to use Rosenhügel for their own productions until 1955.

== Bibliography ==
- Fritsche, Maria. Homemade Men in Postwar Austrian Cinema: Nationhood, Genre and Masculinity. Berghahn Books, 2013.
- Von Dassanowsky, Robert. Austrian Cinema: A History. McFarland, 2005.
