= Mask in Blue =

Mask in Blue may refer to:

- Mask in Blue (original title Maske in Blau), 1937 German operetta
- Mask in Blue (1943 film), German film version directed by Paul Martin
- Mask in Blue (1953 film), German film version directed by Georg Jacoby

== See also ==
- The Blue Mask (disambiguation)
