= Wedding Night in Paradise =

Wedding Night in Paradise may refer to:

- Wedding Night in Paradise (operetta), a 1942 operetta by Friedrich Schröder
- Wedding Night in Paradise (1950 film), a West German musical comedy film, based on the operetta
- Wedding Night in Paradise (1962 film), an Austrian musical comedy film, based on the operetta

== See also ==
- Night in Paradise (disambiguation)
