= Gretl Schörg =

Austrian operatic soprano and actress

Gretl Schörg (17 January 1914 – 4 January 2006) was an Austrian operatic soprano and actress. She was particularly known for her performances in operettas. Her signature roles included Dodo in Wedding Night in Paradise, Josepha Vogelhuber in The White Horse Inn, Juliette in Der Graf von Luxemburg, Julischka in Maske in Blau, Laura in Der Bettelstudent, and Pepi in Wiener Blut. She made several operetta recordings for Telefunken, Columbia Records, and Polydor Records. She was also active as a dramatic actress on the stage and in films. In April 2004 she was awarded the Austrian Cross of Honour for Science and Art, 1st class.

== Life and career ==
Born in Vienna, Schörg first trained for the profession of typist. In 1937, at the age of 23, she won a beauty contest and became "Queen of Danube". That same year she made her stage debut in Ostrava at the Antonín Dvořák Theatre in the world premiere of Ödön von Horváth's play Der jüngste Tag. She spent the next two years performing at that theatre, and at theatres in Karlovy Vary, Ostrava, Marienbad, and Vienna (Theater in der Josefstadt). In 1939 she joined the opera house in Aussig (now Usti nad Labem) where she became popular as a performer in operettas. She made her professional opera debut at that house as Hannerl in Heinrich Berté's arrangement of Franz Schubert's Das Dreimäderlhaus.

In 1940 Schörg went to the Komische Oper Berlin where she was admired in the soubrette and operetta repertoire during the Second World War. With that company she sang in the world premieres of Ludwig Schmidseder's Frauen im Metropol (1940, Fritzi) and Friedrich Schröder's Friedrich Schröder (1941). She also spent those years performing in small film roles.

After the war, Schörg was active in operettas at the Admiralspalast theatre and the Theater am Nollendorfplatz in Berlin. She also began appearing in more prominent roles in films, often in partnership with Johannes Heesters and Romy Schneider. In the first half of the 1950s she performed in many operetta productions of the WDR Cologne with Franz Marszalek. She was then active with the Vienna Volksoper, the Vienna Chamber Opera, and the Staatstheater am Gärtnerplatz in Munich. She was also heard frequently in operetta broadcasts on German and Austrian radio stations during the 1950s.

In the 1960s, Schörg returned to her work as a dramatic actress at the Berliner Boulevardbühnen and Düsseldorfer Boulevardbühnen. For health reasons, she restricted her professional activities during the last decade of her career, which she ended in the early 1970s. She lived in retirement in Vienna, where she died in 2006. She was buried in the Hernalser Cemetery (Group E, No. 129). At the Vienna cemetery administration but is listed as Margaret Pfreimer.

== Selected filmography ==
- Kollege kommt gleich (1943) – Karin, Roberts Schwester
- Herr Sanders lebt gefährlich (1944) – Colette Francis, Revuestar
- Der Mann, dem man den Namen stahl (1944) – Madame Marlen, Singer
- Intimitäten (1948) – Erika, Singer
- The Heavenly Waltz (1948) – Lillian Lord
- Märchen vom Glück (1949) – Violetta Valona
- One Night Apart (1950) – Musette, Sängerin
- This Man Belongs to Me (1950) – Rita Andersen
- Verlobte Leute (1950) – Hanna Döring, die Journalistin
- The Black Forest Girl (1950) – Malwine Heinau – ein Revuestar
- Wedding Night in Paradise (1950) – Rosita Pareira
- Gruß und Kuß aus der Wachau (1950) – Miss Violet Hutton from California
- Woe to Him Who Loves (1951) – Adrienne Dymo / Juliane Dymo
- The Blue Star of the South (1951) – Yella
- Season in Salzburg (1952) – Therese Stolzinger
- Die Fiakermilli (1953) – Fiakermilli
- Lavender (1953) – Eva
- Secretly Still and Quiet (1953) – Carola Werner
- Grandstand for General Staff (1953) – Frau v. Lamasy
- If I Only Have Your Love (1953) – Sophie Strasser
- The Spanish Fly (1955) – Miss Hilton
- Bel Ami (1955) – Clothilde de Marelle
- Die Deutschmeister (1955) – Hansi Führer
- His Daughter is Called Peter (1955) – Nora Christian
- I'll See You at Lake Constance (1956) – Marianne
- Imperial and Royal Field Marshal (1956) – Mizzi Elster, Soubrette
- My Ninety Nine Brides (1958)
- Arena of Fear (1959) – Olga, Sekreträrin
- Jacqueline (1959) – Frau Burg
- Vor Jungfrauen wird gewarnt (1961) – Frau Walztigel
- Im schwarzen Rössl (1961) – Wirtin des Weißen Rößl
- Street of Temptation (1962) – Rita
- Honour Among Thieves (1966) – Red Erna
- Wiener Schnitzel (1967)
- Donnerwetter! Donnerwetter! Bonifatius Kiesewetter (1969) – Baronin Ziegler
- Unsere Pauker gehen in die Luft (1970) – Mathilde Weber
- Immer die verflixten Weiber (1971) – Apothekerin
- The Mad Aunts Strike Out (1971) – Irene Wiedemann
- Love Is Only a Word (1971) – Pflegerin
- Kinderarzt Dr. Fröhlich (1972) – Heimleiterin Frau Zumbusch
- My Daughter, Your Daughter (1972) – Schuldirektorin Regina Körner
- Change (1975) – Frau Schirnberg

== Literature ==
- Klaus Rittweger: Gretl Schörg. Mein Theaterleben. Wagner, Gelnhausen 2004, ISBN 3-935232-22-5
