= Simone Rethel =

German actress and author

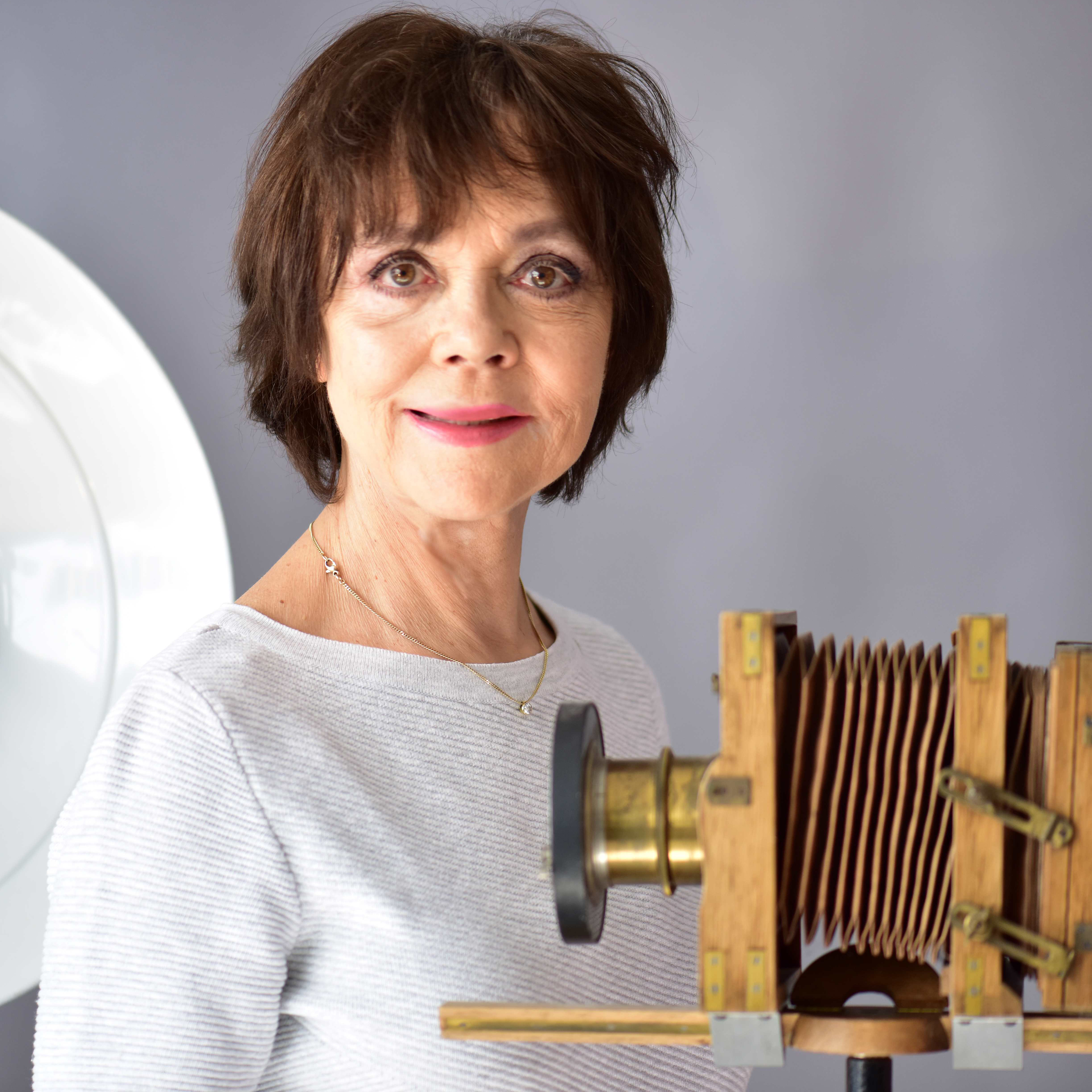
- Rethel in 2019
- Born: 15 June 1949 (age 77); Herrsching am Ammersee, Bavaria
- Occupation: Actress
- Years active: 1965–present

Simone Rethel-Heesters (born 15 June 1949 in Herrsching am Ammersee, Bavaria) is a German actress and writer.

== Biography ==
Simone Rethel is the daughter of painter and designer Alfred Rethel and the granddaughter of aircraft designer Walter Rethel. She is the descendant of historical painter Otto Rethel, the brother of Alfred Rethel.

As a student in 1965, she played the main role in Axel von Ambesser's film Die fromme Helene alongside Theo Lingen and Friedrich von Thun. After she completed schooling, she took part to Hanna Burgwitz's acting lessons and made her stage debut during her formation by playing in Joseph von Eichendorff's Die Freier at the Bayerisches Staatsschauspiel in Munich in 1966 under the direction of Axel von Ambesser, who had discovered her and later granted her several stage and television roles.

Rethel mainly appeared in boulevard theatre plays and had roles in numerous television series such as Der Kommissar, Derrick, The Old Fox, Schöne Ferien and Diese Drombuschs.

Simone Rethel was married to Johannes Heesters from 1992 until his death in 2011. Heesters was 46 years older than her.

Besides her acting career, Rethel was also a painter and a photographer. Since early 2005, she has been an ambassador of Altern in Würde and has raised awareness about Alzheimer's disease. In early 2010, she published her book Sag nie, du bist zu alt, in which she criticises negative view of society on ageing.

== Filmography ==
- 1965: Die fromme Helene
- 1966/67: Die Frau des Fotografen (TV)
- 1969: Junger Herr auf altem Hof (TV series, 13 episodes)
- 1971: Der erste Frühlingstag (TV film)
- 1971: Der Kommissar: Der Moormörder (TV)
- 1972: Der Kommissar: Tod eines Schulmädchens (TV)
- 1972: À la guerre comme à la guerre
- 1973: Der Lord von Barmbeck
- 1973: Der Komödienstadel: Kleine Welt (TV)
- 1973: Der Kommissar: Der Tod von Karin W. (TV)
- 1974: Der Kommissar: Mit den Augen eines Mörders (TV)
- 1974: Die schöne Helena (TV film)
- 1977: Es muß nicht immer Kaviar sein (TV series)
- 1977: Tatort: Drei Schlingen (TV)
- 1977: The Old Fox: Konkurs (TV)
- 1978: Das Geld liegt auf der Bank (TV film)
- 1978: The Pentecost Outing
- 1979: The Old Fox: Neue Sachlichkeit (TV)
- 1983: Omelette Surprise (TV film)
- 1983: Der Trauschein (TV film)
- 1983: Die violette Mütze (TV film)
- 1983: Derrick – Die Schrecken der Nacht (TV
- 1985: Schöne Ferien (TV series, 5 episodes)
- 1985–1986: Polizeiinspektion 1 (TV series, 2 episodes)
- 1992–1993: Diese Drombuschs (TV series, 9 episodes)
- 1992: Chéri, mein Mann kommt! (TV film)
- 1993: Glückliche Reise: Neuseeland (TV)
- 1994: Der Heiratsvermittler (TV film)
- 1994–1996: Immer wieder Sonntag (TV series)
- 1994: Drei zum Verlieben (TV)
- 1995: Der Mond scheint auch für Untermieter (TV)
- 1995: Zwei alte Hasen (TV)
- 1996: Ein gesegnetes Alter (TV film)
- 1996: Rosamunde Pilcher: Schneesturm im Frühling (TV)
- 1996: Im Namen des Gesetzes: Das Heim (TV)
- 1997: Entre terre et mer (TV miniseries)
- 1999: Theater: Momo (TV film)
- 1999: Stubbe – Von Fall zu Fall: Die Seherin (TV)
- 1999: Das Amt: Späte Liebe (TV)
- 2000: Fast ein Gentleman: Der Gockl (TV)
- 2003: In aller Freundschaft: Zurück ins Leben (TV)
- 2008: Wege zum Glück (1 episode)
- 2012: Die Garmisch-Cops: Badeschaum für einen Toten (TV)
- 2016: Die Rosenheim-Cops: Schönheit hat ihren Preis (TV)
- 2016: Schwarzach 23 und die Jagd nach dem Mordsfinger (TV film)
- 2017: SOKO München: Altweibersommer (TV)
- 2017: Sturm der Liebe (TV series)
- 2019: Stuttgart Homicide: Kaffeefahrt (TV)
- 2021: Die Rosenheim-Cops: Drei Grazien und ein Todesfall (TV)
- 2024: Hubert ohne Staller: Zu den Sternen (TV)
- 2025: Die Rosenheim-Cops: Ein Job für Wiebke (TV)

== Publications ==
- Simone Rethel; Beatrix Ross (1998). Schönheit des Alters (in German). Nürnberg: Burgschmiet. ISBN 3-933731-01-1.
- Simone Rethel-Heesters (2006). Johannes Heesters: Ein Mensch und ein Jahrhundert (in German). Berlin: Schwarzkopf & Schwarzkopf. ISBN 3-89602-731-X.
- Simone Rethel-Heesters (2010). Sag nie, du bist zu alt (in German). Frankfurt: Westend Verlag. ISBN 978-3-938060-35-3.
- Rei Gesing with Simone Rethel-Heesters (preface) and André Kröker (2018). Die Weisheit der 100-Jährigen. 7 Fragen an die ältesten Menschen Deutschlands. MonoLit (in German). Vol. 1. Münster: Solibro Verlag. ISBN 978-3-96079-061-7.
