= Fred Raymond =

Austrian composer

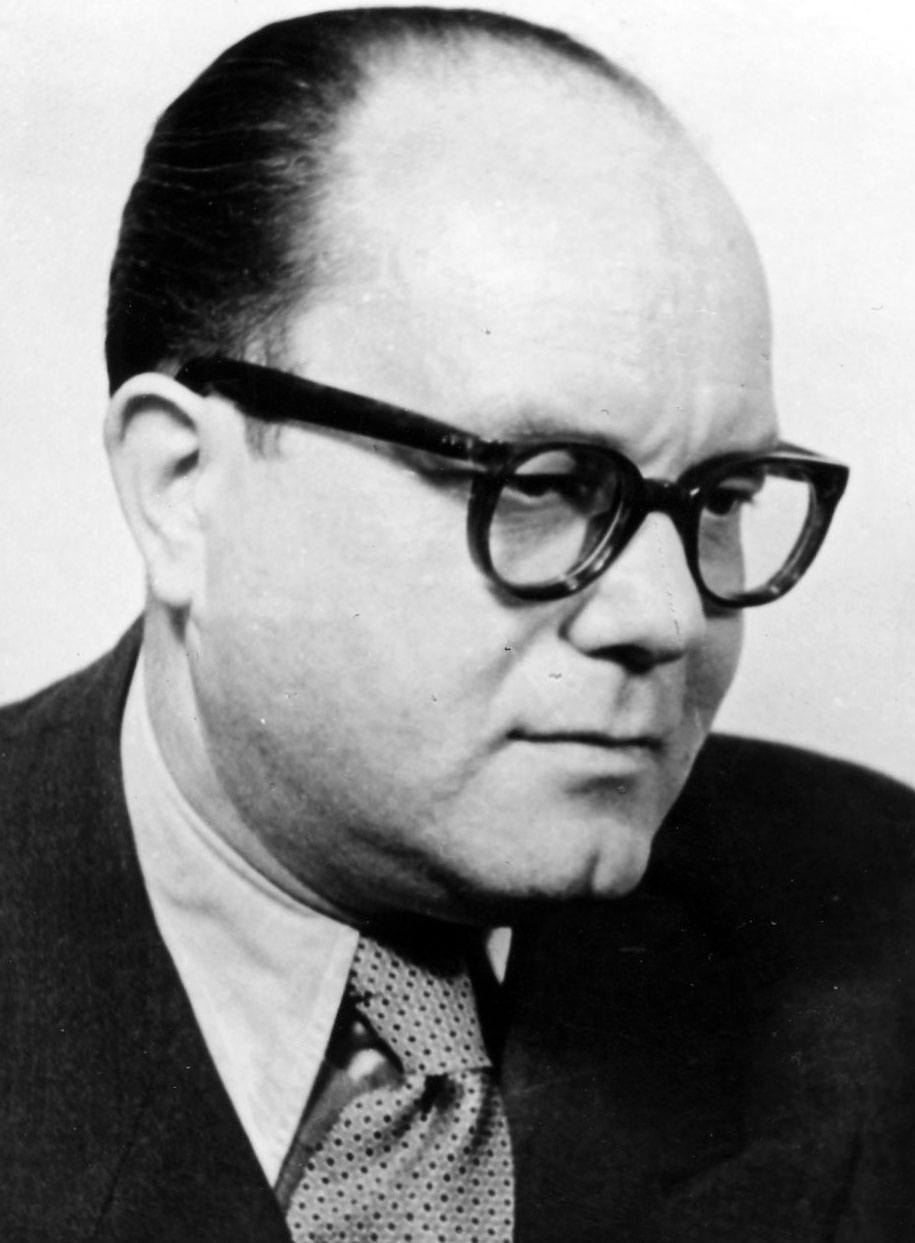
Fred Raymond (1953)

Fred Raymond aka Raimund Friedrich Vesely (20 April 1900 – 10 January 1954) was an Austrian composer.

Raymond, born in Vienna, was the third child (after two daughters) of Vinzenz Vesely, an employee of the Austrian state railway system, and his wife Henriette, née Dluhos. Both parents were of Czech descent. They intended their son to study mining after high school, and pursure a career in the civil service. After the premature death of both his parents, Raymond studied at a commercial academy and trained as a banker.

Raymond composed operetta music as well as copious pieces for films and Schlager, which were very successful in the 1920s and 1930s and were commonly heard being sung and whistled in the streets. He became world-famous with his 1925 composition "Ich hab mein Herz in Heidelberg verloren" ("I Lost My Heart in Heidelberg"), and his pieces were considered to be very much in the typical style of the 1920s, especially "Ich hab' das Fräulein Helen baden seh'n" ("I Saw Miss Helen Bathing") or "Ich reiß' mir eine Wimper aus" ("I Lost An Eyelash").

Due to a weak heart, he spent his military service with a propaganda company which served the Belgrade military transmitter. After the war, he took a short break from the Salzburg Radio Orchestra to go to Hamburg, where he finished his last two operettas, Geliebte Manuela (Beloved Manuela) and Flieder aus Wien (Lilacs from Vienna).

In 1951, he moved to a new home in Überlingen, Baden-Württemberg, Germany, where he spent three years with his young wife Eva-Maria before dying of a heart failure shortly before the birth of their son, Thomas. His marble grave is located in Überlingen, on the shore of Lake Constance, and is decorated with a lyre. To commemorate the eightieth year of his birth, a street was named after him in the Donaustadt district of Vienna.

== Operettas ==
- Lauf ins Glück (Run into Happiness) (1934)
- Ball der Nationen (Ball of the Nations) (1935)
- Fahrt ins Abenteuer (A Trip into Adventure) (1935)
- Auf großer Fahrt (On a Great Voyage) (1936)
- Marielu (1936)
- Maske in Blau (Blue Mask), book by Heinz Hentschke, lyrics by Günther Schwenn (1937)
- Saison in Salzburg (Salzburger Nockerln) (Season in Salzburg – Salzburg dumplings) (1938)
- Die Perle von Tokaj (The Tokay Pearls) (1941)
- Konfetti (Confetti) (1948)
- Flieder aus Wien (Lilacs from Vienna) (1949)
- Geliebte Manuela (Beloved Manuela) (1951)

== Films Based on Raymond's Works ==
With year and director:

- I Lost My Heart in Heidelberg (1926, Arthur Bergen)
- Mein Heidelberg, Ich kann dich nicht vergessen (1927, James Bauer)
- In einer kleinen Konditorei (1930, Robert Wohlmuth)
- Nur am Rhein (1930, Max Mack)
- Una Notte con te (1932, Ferruccio Biancini)
- Das Glück wohnt nebenan (1939, Hubert Marischka)
- Mask in Blue (1943, Paul Martin)
- ...und die Musik spielt dazu (1943, Carl Boese)
- Lascia cantare il cuore (1943, Roberto Savarese)
- Saison in Salzburg (1952, Ernst Marischka)
- I Lost My Heart in Heidelberg (1952, Ernst Neubach)
- Mask in Blue (1953, Georg Jacoby)
- Prosecutor Corda (1953, Karl Ritter)
- Ball of Nations (1954, Karl Ritter)
- Die Perle von Tokay (1954, Hubert Marischka)
- Saison in Salzburg (1961, Franz Josef Gottlieb)

== Notes ==
- Lamb, Andrew. 2001. "Raymond, Fred". The New Grove Dictionary of Music and Musicians, ed. S. Sadie and J. Tyrrell. London: Macmillan.
