= Nicole Heesters =

German actress (born 1937)

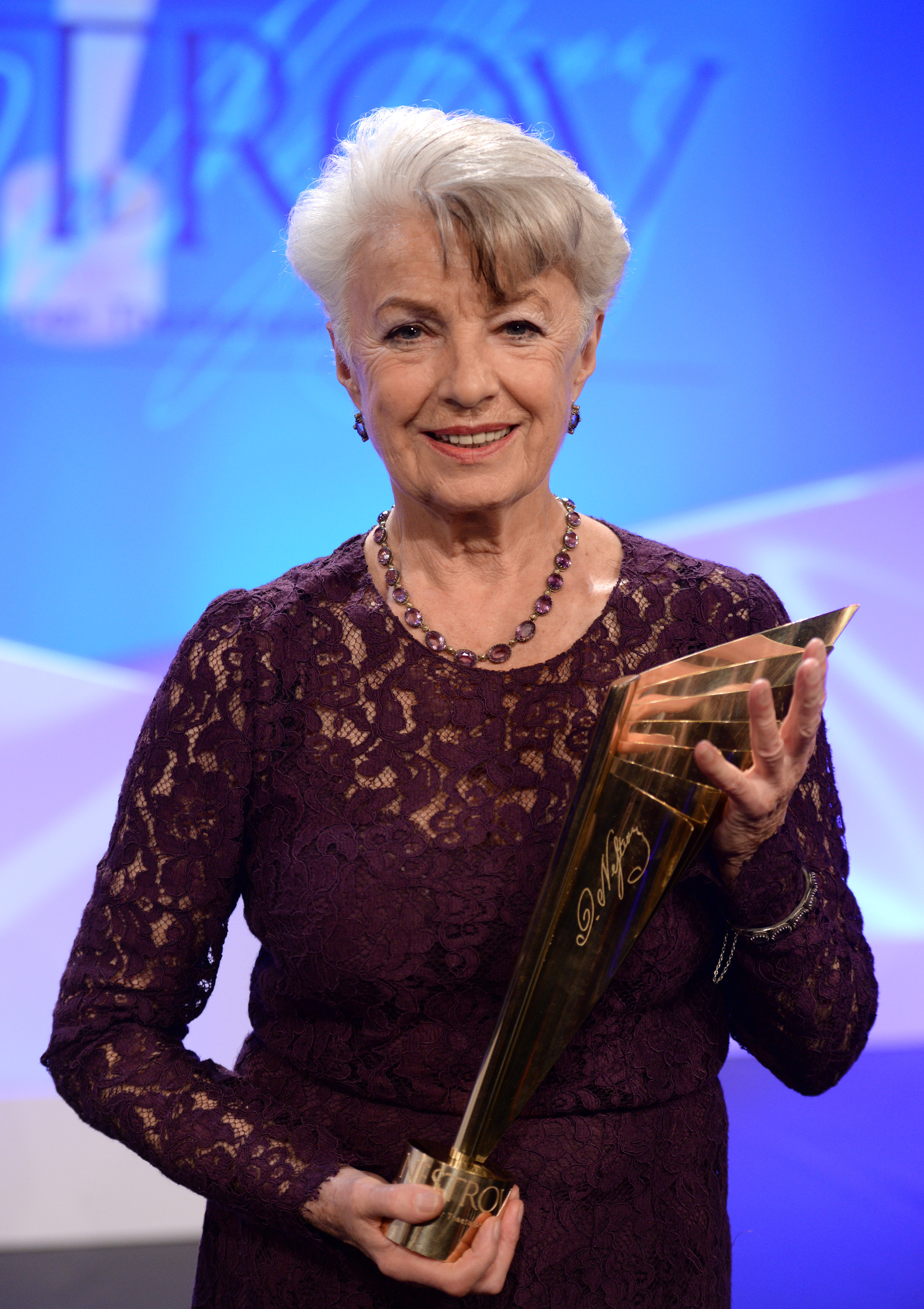
- Heesters – Nestroy Theatre Prize 2014 at Wiener Stadthalle (Vienna, Austria).
- Born: 14 February 1937 (age 88); Potsdam, Germany
- Occupation: Actress
- Years active: 1953–present

Nicole Heesters (born 14 February 1937) is a German actress. She was born in Potsdam and comes from a family of actors; her parents are Johannes Heesters, a Dutch-German actor, and Louisa Ghijs, a Belgian stage actress. Her husband was film director Pit Fischer and one of her children, daughter Saskia Fischer, is also an actress. Nicole's older sister Wiesje (b. 1931) is a pianist in Vienna, Austria. Heesters lives in Hamburg.

== Selected filmography ==
- 1954: Cabaret
- 1955: Three Men in the Snow
- 1955: Her First Date
- 1968: Count Oederland (TV film)
- 1972: Alexander Zwo (TV miniseries)
- 1981: After Midnight
- 1982: Kamikaze 1989
- 1989: The Play with Billions (TV film)
- 1997: Lamorte (TV film)
- 1998: Meschugge
- 1999: Klemperer – Ein Leben in Deutschland (TV series)
- 2000: Frauen lügen besser (TV film)
- 2000: Für die Liebe ist es nie zu spät (TV film)
- 2000: Deutschlandspiel (TV film), as Margaret Thatcher
- 2001: Vamp in Negligee (TV film)
- 2002: Der letzte Zeuge: Die Kugel im Lauf der Dinge (TV)
- 2002: Donna Leon: Nobiltà (TV)
- 2003: Treibjagd (TV film)
- 2003: Rosamunde Pilcher: Gewissheit des Herzens (TV film)
- 2007: Zeit zu leben (TV film)
- 2007: Sehnsucht nach Rimini (TV film)
- 2007: Copacabana (TV film)
- 2008–2010: Der Kommissar und das Meer (TV series)
- 2009: Fünf Tage Vollmond (TV film)
- 2009: Wallace Line
- 2011: SOKO Donau: Todesengel (TV)
- 2011: Ein Sommer in Paris (TV film)
- 2012: The Wood Baroness (TV film)
- 2016: Lou Andreas-Salomé, The Audacity to be Free
- 2020: The Magic Kids: Three Unlikely Heroes
- 2020: Breaking Even (TV series)
