= Season in Salzburg (1952 film) =

1952 film

- Directed by: Ernst Marischka
- Written by: Ernst Marischka
- Based on: Season in Salzburg (operetta) by: Kurt Feltz; Max Wallner
- Produced by: Friedrich Erban; Ernst Marischka
- Starring: Johanna Matz; Adrian Hoven; Walter Müller
- Cinematography: Sepp Ketterer
- Music by: Fred Raymond
- Release dates: 9 September 1952 (West Germany); 23 October 1952 (Austria)
- Running time: 102 min.
- Country: Austria
- Language: German

Season in Salzburg (German: Saison in Salzburg) is a 1952 Austrian musical film directed by Ernst Marischka and starring Johanna Matz, Adrian Hoven, and Walter Müller. It is based on the operetta Season in Salzburg by Fred Raymond, Kurt Feltz and Max Wallner.

== Synopsis ==
During the musical season in Salzburg a number of misunderstandings occur, leading up to a happy ending for everyone involved.

== Cast ==
- Johanna Matz as Annemarie
- Adrian Hoven as Heinz Doll
- Walter Müller as Hans Stiegler
- Gretl Schörg as Therese Stolzinger
- Hans Richter as Werner Mack
- Ady Berber as Sepp, Gärtner
- Gusti Wolf as Vroni, Magd
- Lotte Lang as Walpurga, Köchin
- Hermann Erhardt as Xaver Möhslacher
- Else Rambausek as Lina Möhslacher
- Richard Romanowsky as Professor Spindler
- Erik Frey as Dr. Erich Elz
- Loni Heuser as Hedi Prittwitz
- Richard Eybner as Gendermarie-Inspektor
- Fritz Imhoff as Kommissar

== Bibliography ==
- Fritsche, Maria. Homemade Men in Postwar Austrian Cinema: Nationhood, Genre and Masculinity. Berghahn Books, 2013.
