= I Often Think of Piroschka =

1955 film

- Gereman film poster
- German: Ich denke oft an Piroschka
- Directed by: Kurt Hoffmann
- Written by: Per Schwenzen; Joachim Wedekind
- Based on: I Often Think of Piroschka by Hugo Hartung
- Produced by: Georg Witt
- Starring: Liselotte Pulver; Gunnar Möller; Wera Frydtberg; Gustav Knuth
- Cinematography: Richard Angst
- Edited by: Claus von Boro
- Music by: Franz Grothe
- Production companies: Georg Witt-Film; Bavaria Film
- Distributed by: Bavaria Film
- Release date: 29 December 1955
- Running time: 96 minutes
- Country: West Germany
- Language: German

I Often Think of Piroschka (German: Ich denke oft an Piroschka) is a 1955 German romantic comedy film directed by Kurt Hoffmann and starring Liselotte Pulver, Gunnar Möller and Wera Frydtberg. It was shot at the Bavaria Studios in Munich. The film's sets were designed by the art director Ludwig Reiber. It is based on the novel of the same name by Hugo Hartung.

== Plot ==
The frame story shows Andreas, a middle aged man, sitting in a train and reminiscing about "Piroschka". The main story starts with him as a young university student travelling on a riverboat along the Danube, on his way to spend several weeks with a host family in the small Hungarian village of Hódmezővásárhely-Kutasipuszta. On board he meets and befriends fellow German Greta, who is on her way to a vacation on Lake Balaton. When the boat arrives in Budapest, they spend the evening together, with Andreas falling for Greta. After their romantic dinner and stroll is disturbed by an intrusive fiddler, they part ways but promise to contact each other.

The next day, after a long train ride, Andreas arrives at Hódmezővásárhely-Kutasipuszta and is cordially welcomed by his hosts, doctor Johann von Csíky and his wife Ilonka, and by many others including István, the station master. The next day, when exploring the village and taking pictures, Andreas, who does not speak Hungarian, meets a feisty girl who does not answer his questions in German. Believing her not to speak his language, he makes several snarky remarks regarding her looks and behavior. When he learns that the girl, who is István's daughter Piroschka, is in fact the best student of German in the village and understood him perfectly, he is embarrassed. But Piroschka does not seem to mind and happily accompanies him to a feast he and his hosts are invited to. During the celebration, she coaxes him to dance the Csárdás with her. They have a great time and, in the next weeks, spend much time together, e.g. teaching each other their respective languages. Andreas begins to develop feelings for her.

One day a postcard from Greta arrives, inviting him to visit her in Siófok. This leaves Andreas conflicted. He tries to keep the contents of the postcard secret from Piroschka and takes the earliest train the next morning. But Piroschka has read the postcard and sneaks onto the same train, following Andreas to the hotel in Siófok. When he meets Greta there, they both notice Piroschka. After some confusion, Andreas and Greta tell Piroschka to take the next train back but agree to spend the day together until the train leaves. In the evening, Piroschka again convinces Andreas to dance the Csárdás with her and Greta notices how happy he seems. Piroschka misses the evening train and Greta agrees to let her sleep in her room. During the night, Piroschka slips out and into Andreas' room, where she tearfully apologizes for his trouble and then leaves. The next morning, Greta tells Andreas that she knows he loves Piroschka. He rushes back home but is told that Piroschka does not want to see him.

Andreas spends the last days of his vacation depressed. On his last night he meets Piroschka at another celebration, but she ignores him. Only after they are left alone together by a supportive Johann, they reconcile. But Piroschka soon has to leave to take her drunk father home. Both are heartbroken that Andreas has to leave the next morning. But when his express train passes the town again the same night, Piroschka has manipulated the railway signals so that the train stops and she can "kidnap" him from the train. They spend the night together and Andreas promises to come back next year.

The frame story then ends with Andreas explaining that he never was able to return but that this way he will always remember Piroschka as "young and sweet."

== Cast ==
- Liselotte Pulver as Piroschka Rácz
- Gunnar Möller as Andreas
- Wera Frydtberg as Greta
- Gustav Knuth as István Rácz
- Rudolf Vogel as Sándor
- Adrienne Gessner as Ilonka von Csiky
- Annie Rosar as hotel keeper Márton
- Margit Symo as Etelka Rácz
- Fritz Hinz-Fabricius as Johann von Csiky
- Otto Storr as a priest
- Eva Karsay as Judith

== Reception ==
The film is in the heimatfilm tradition which was at its height when the film was released. It was extremely popular, and Pulver became closely identified with her role as the title character Piroschka.
