= Secretly Still and Quiet =

1953 film

- Directed by: Hans Deppe
- Written by: Joachim Wedekind
- Produced by: Hans Deppe
- Starring: Gretl Schörg; Hans Nielsen; Theo Lingen
- Cinematography: Ekkehard Kyrath
- Edited by: Walter Wischniewsky
- Music by: Paul Lincke; Michael Jary
- Production company: Bavaria Film
- Distributed by: Bavaria Film
- Release date: 24 September 1953
- Running time: 88 minutes
- Country: West Germany
- Language: German

Secretly Still and Quiet (German: Heimlich, still und leise) is a 1953 West German musical comedy film directed by Hans Deppe and starring Gretl Schörg, Hans Nielsen, and Theo Lingen. It was made at the Munich Studios of Bavaria Film. The film's sets were designed by the art director Erich Kettelhut.

== Cast ==
- Gretl Schörg as Carola Werner
- Hans Nielsen as Harry Vondenhoff
- Theo Lingen as Theo
- Lina Carstens as Tante Titania
- Werner Fuetterer as Conradi
- Walter Giller as Peter Vondenhoff
- Ellinor Jensen as Margot von Dinkelage
- Bruno Fritz
- Walter Gross
- Maria Krahn
- Ruth Nimbach
- Franz Schafheitlin
- Hans Hermann Schaufuß
- Erna Sellmer
- Ewald Wenck

== Bibliography ==
- Bock, Hans-Michael; Bergfelder, Tim, eds. (2009). The Concise Cinegraph: Encyclopaedia of German Cinema. New York: Berghahn Books. ISBN 978-1-57181-655-9.
