= Walter Müller (actor) =

Austrian actor

- Born: 6 May 1911; Prague, Austria-Hungary
- Died: 2 March 1969 (aged 57); Starnberg, West Germany
- Occupation: Film actor
- Years active: 1940–1969

Walter Müller (1911–1969) was an Austrian film actor.

== Filmography ==
Year	Title	Role	Notes
1940	Herzensfreud - Herzensleid	Ferdinand Haberl	
1943	A Waltz with You	Kapellmeister Paul Struck, Verehrer Lottes	
1944	The Woman of My Dreams	Erwin Forster, Ingenieur	
1947	The Singing House	Freddy	
1949	Ein bezaubernder Schwindler	Robby Weber, Schlagzeuger, Martins Freund	
1950	The Black Forest Girl	Richard Petersen	
1950	Es schlägt 13	Verlagsdirektor Dr. Michael Ravestyn	
1950	Gruß und Kuß aus der Wachau	Otto Binder	
1951	Das Herz einer Frau	Berger	
1951	Durch dick und dünn	Sartorius	
1951	Johannes und die 13 Schönheitsköniginnen	Johannes Waller, genannt Hans	
1951	Wenn eine Wienerin Walzer tanzt		
1951	The Dubarry	Cäsar Schnepf	
1951	The Csardas Princess	Boni Kancsianu	
1952	Season in Salzburg	Hans Stiegler	
1952	The Land of Smiles	Gustl Potter, ein junger Wiener	
1952	The White Horse Inn	Oberkellner Leopold	
1953	Mask in Blue	Seppl Frauenhofer	
1953	To Be Without Worries	Weinberl	
1953	Southern Nights	Harry	
1953	On the Green Meadow	Otto Liebling	
1953	When The Village Music Plays on Sunday Nights	Jonny	
1953	Hab' ich nur deine Liebe	Toni	
1953	Hooray, It's a Boy!	Fritz Pappenstiel	
1954	Kaisermanöver	Franz Radler	
1954	König der Manege	Billy	
1954	König der Manege	Billy	
1954	Ball of Nations	Michel	
1955	The False Adam	Robert Bullinger	
1955	Three Days Confined to Barracks''	Musketier Max Plettke	
1955	The Three from the Filling Station	Robert	
1956	Das Liebesleben des schönen Franz	Franz Steiner	
1956	Holiday am Wörthersee	Fritz Groß	
1956	Hurra - die Firma hat ein Kind	Hartmut Stolzenberg	
1957	Drei Mann auf einem Pferd	Clemens Holm	
1958	Hoch klingt der Radetzkymarsch	Lazi von Doloman - Major	
1958	Love, Girls and Soldiers	Oberleutnant Bobby von Riedhoff	
1960	Sooo nicht, meine Herren	Tarzan, der Plumpe	
1961	Our Crazy Aunts	Dr. Emil Rautenstrauch	
1963	Hochzeit am Neusiedlersee	Neffe Heinrich	
1965	Ein Ferienbett mit 100 PS	Anreißer	
1966	Spukschloß im Salzkammergut	Heinricha Sauerwein	
