= Her First Date =

1955 film

- Directed by: Axel von Ambesser
- Written by: Max Kolpé; Axel von Ambesser
- Produced by: Eduard Hoesch
- Starring: Nicole Heesters; Paul Dahlke; Adrian Hoven
- Cinematography: Willi Sohm
- Edited by: Herma Sandtner
- Music by: Peter Kreuder; René Sylviano
- Production companies: Donau-Filmproduktion Eduard Hoesch; Melodie Film
- Distributed by: Europa-Filmverleih
- Release date: 25 August 1955
- Running time: 100 minutes
- Countries: Austria; West Germany
- Language: German

Her First Date (German: Ihr erstes Rendezvous) is a 1955 Austrian-West German romantic comedy film directed by Axel von Ambesser and starring Nicole Heesters, Paul Dahlke and Adrian Hoven. It was shot in Agfacolor at the Salzburg Studios and on location around the city and Lake Wolfgang. The film's sets were designed by the art director Julius von Borsody. It is a remake of the 1941 French film Premier rendez-vous, with the setting shifted to post-war Salzburg.

== Cast ==
- Nicole Heesters as Christa, ein Waisenmädchen
- Paul Dahlke as Martin, Literaturprofessor
- Adrian Hoven as Rolf
- Karl Schönböck as Waldemar, Mathematikprofessor
- Erika von Thellmann as Fräulein Rodenstock, Aufsichtsdame im Waisenhaus
- Wera Frydtberg as Erika, Christas Freundin
- Luzi Neudecker as Margot, Christas Freundin
- Theodor Danegger as Kellner im Lokal 'Capri'
- Karl Ehmann as Postbeamter
- Hans Fitz as Schuldirektor Im Bubeninternat
- Franz Fröhlich as Bauer am Salzburger Markt
- Fritz Grieb as Der komische Dicke, Schüler
- Karl Haberfellner as Der lustige Floh, Schüler
- Michael Janisch as Taxichauffeur
- Heli Lichten as Bäuerin am Salzburger Markt
- Hilde Schreiber as Elisabeth, junge Aussictsdame im Waisenhaus
- Lola Urban-Kneidinger as Direktorin im Waisenhaus
- Peter Vogel as Der lange Robby, Schüler
- Alexander von Richthofen as Der schöne Harald, Schüler

== Bibliography ==
- Fritsche, Maria. Homemade Men in Postwar Austrian Cinema: Nationhood, Genre and Masculinity. Berghahn Books, 2013.
