= Lavender (1953 film) =

1953 film directed by Arthur Maria Rabenalt

- German: Lavendel
- Directed by: Arthur Maria Rabenalt
- Written by: Fritz Böttger; Arthur Maria Rabenalt; Bruno Schuppler (novel)
- Produced by: Ernest Müller
- Starring: Gretl Schörg; Karl Schönböck; Hans Holt
- Cinematography: Elio Carniel
- Edited by: Angelica Appel
- Music by: Hans Hagen
- Production companies: Rex-Film; Schönbrunn-Film
- Distributed by: Super Film
- Release date: 21 August 1953
- Running time: 90 minutes
- Countries: Austria; West Germany
- Language: German

Lavender (German: Lavendel) is a 1953 Austrian-German comedy film directed by Arthur Maria Rabenalt and starring Gretl Schörg, Karl Schönböck, and Hans Holt. It was made at the Schönbrunn Studios in Vienna. The film's sets were designed by the art director Felix Smetana.

== Cast ==
- Gretl Schörg as Eva
- Karl Schönböck as Gallenberg
- Hans Holt as Neubeck
- Erni Mangold as Susanne
- Hans Putz as Kramer
- Elisabeth Stemberger as Mizzi
- Fritz Imhoff as Florian
- Gisa Wurm as Lavendelweib
- Ernst Pröckl as Leopold
- Liane Augustin as singer
