= The Carnival Is Here Again =

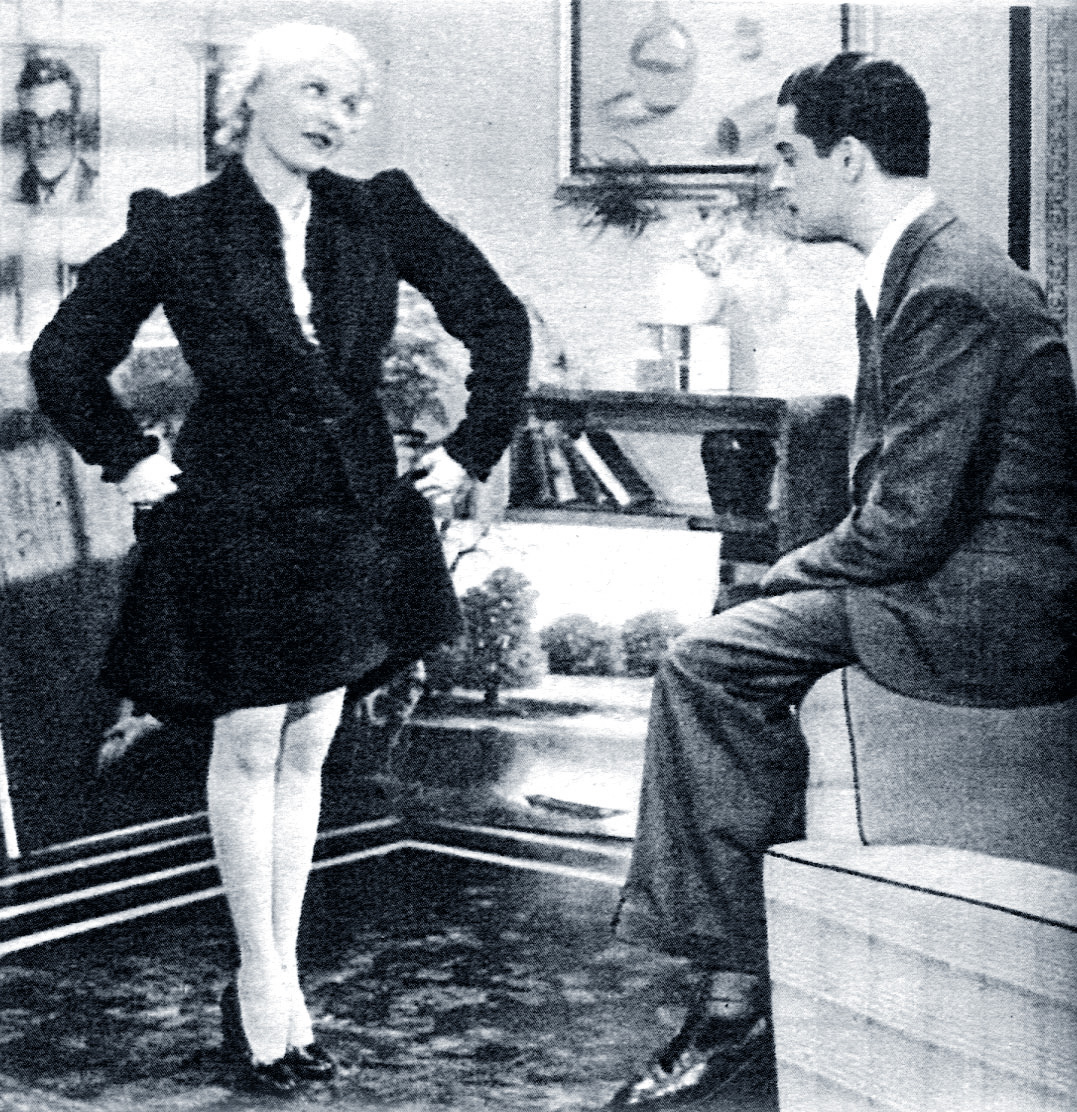
- Clara Tabody and Mario Pisu in a scene from the film
- Directed by: Raffaello Matarazzo
- Written by: Guido Cantini (play); Aldo De Benedetti; Aldo Vergano
- Starring: Armando Falconi; Clara Tabody; Franco Coop
- Cinematography: Massimo Terzano
- Edited by: Marcello Caccialupi
- Music by: Felice Montagnini
- Production company: Tiberia Film
- Distributed by: Grandi Film
- Release date: 1937
- Running time: 87 minutes
- Country: Italy
- Language: Italian

The Carnival Is Back or The Carnival Is Here Again (Italian: È tornato carnevale) is a 1937 Italian "white-telephones" comedy film directed by Raffaello Matarazzo and starring Armando Falconi, Clara Tabody and Franco Coop. The film was based on a popular stage play in which Falconi had previously starred. It is now considered a lost film.

It was shot at the Cines Studios in Rome and on location in the capital city and around the Gulf of Naples. The film's sets were designed by the art director Gastone Medin.

== Cast ==
- Armando Falconi as Il duca Gualtiero di Fogliaverde
- Clara Tabody as Kay
- Franco Coop as Gennariello, servitore del duca
- Mario Pisu as Fausto, il pittore
- Nicola Maldacea as Romeo
- Dora Menichelli as La contessa di Mont-Marsan
- Hilda Springher as Concettina
- Celeste Almieri as La marchesa di Pigna
- Ugo Ceseri as Prosperone Lauria
- Albino Principe as Max
- Armando Anselmo as Il marchese di Pigna
- Ornella Da Vasto
- Lia Rosa
- Rolando Costantino

== Bibliography ==
- Aprà, Adriano. The Fabulous Thirties: Italian cinema 1929-1944. Electa International, 1979.
