= Heinz Hentschke =

Actor, director, and librettist of German-language operettas

Heinz Hentschke (born 20 February 1895 in Berlin, Germany; died 3 July 1970 in Berlin) was an actor, director and librettist of German-language operettas. Hentschke started out as a theatrical actor working mainly in Berlin, Bremen, and Hamburg. He was the director of the Lessing Theatre in Berlin from 1934 to 1944. During this time, he wrote the librettos for 14 grand operettas, among which were Maske in Blau. Most of his works were under direct supervision by, and had to be approved by Josef Goebbels' cultural office of the Nazi party during Adolf Hitler's regime, and therefore were considered "tainted" after World War II.

== Librettos ==
- Lauf ins Glück (1934, music by Fred Raymond)
- Ball der Nationen (1935, music by Fred Raymond)
- Auf großer Fahrt (1936, music by Fred Raymond)
- Maske in Blau (1937, music by Fred Raymond)
- Melodie der Nacht (1938, music by Ludwig Schmidseder)
- Die oder Keine (1939, music by Ludwig Schmidseder)
- Der arme Jonathan (1939, rewriting of an 1890 operetta by Carl Millöcker)
- Frauen im Metropol (1940, music by Ludwig Schmidseder)
- Hochzeitsnacht im Paradies (1942, music by Friedrich Schröder)
- Der goldene Käfig (1943, music by Theo Mackeben)
- Die rote Isabell (1951, music by Siegfried Ulbrich)

== Filmography ==
- Mask in Blue, directed by Paul Martin (1943)
- Wedding Night In Paradise, directed by Géza von Bolváry (1950)
- Mask in Blue, directed by Georg Jacoby (1953)
- Ball der Nationen, directed by Karl Ritter (1954)
- Wedding Night In Paradise, directed by Paul Martin (1962)
