= Woe to Him Who Loves =

1951 film

- Directed by: Sándor Szlatinay
- Written by: Eberhard Keindorff
- Produced by: Gyula Trebitsch
- Starring: Gretl Schörg; Wolf Albach-Retty; Hubert von Meyerinck
- Cinematography: Willy Winterstein
- Edited by: Alice Ludwig
- Music by: Sándor Szlatinay
- Production company: Real Film
- Distributed by: Allianz Filmverleih
- Release date: 1 May 1951
- Running time: 86 minutes
- Country: West Germany
- Language: German

Woe to Him Who Loves (German: Weh dem, der liebt!) is a 1951 West German musical comedy film directed by Sándor Szlatinay and starring Gretl Schörg, Wolf Albach-Retty and Hubert von Meyerinck. It was shot at the Wandsbek Studios in Hamburg. The film's sets were designed by the art director Herbert Kirchhoff.

== Cast ==
- Gretl Schörg as Adrienne Dymo / Juliane Dymo
- Wolf Albach-Retty as Dr. Gött
- Arno Assmann as Tobias Schramm
- Hubert von Meyerinck as Neumann
- Erika von Thellmann as Frau Bäbbermann
- Oskar Sima as Knorr
- Hermann Pfeiffer as Dr. Schmidt
- Rudolf Platte as Worringer
- Joseph Offenbach as Ton-Ingenieur
- Horst von Otto as Solms
- Willibald Alexis as Petersdorff
- Käte Pontow as Marie
- Adalbert Kriwat as Amtsgerichtsrat
- Herbert Wilk as Julianes Anwalt
- Katharina Brauren as Garderobiere
- Charlotte Harke as Sekretärin

== Bibliography ==
- Goble, Alan. The Complete Index to Literary Sources in Film. Walter de Gruyter, 1999.
- Winkler, Christoph & von Rauch, Johanna. Tanzende Sterne und nasser Asphalt: die Filmarchitekten Herbert Kirchhoff und Albrecht Becker und das Gesicht des deutschen Films in den fünfziger Jahren. Dölling und Galitz, 2001.
