= Hermann Kugelstadt =

German screenwriter and film director

- Born: 16 February 1912; Limburg an der Lahn, Hesse, German Empire
- Died: 9 March 2001 (aged 89); Zell am See, Salzburg, Austria
- Occupations: Director, Writer
- Years active: 1937 - 1981

Hermann Kugelstadt (1912–2001) was a German screenwriter and film director. In the 1950s he directed a number of productions in the popular heimatfilm tradition. During the 1960s he switched to television work.

== Selected filmography ==
=== Director ===
- Heimat Bells (1952)
- The Mill in the Black Forest (1953)
- The Hunter's Cross (1954)
- The Dark Star (1955)
- The Forest House in Tyrol (1955)
- Two Bavarians in St. Pauli (1956)
- The Hunter from Roteck (1956)
- Between Munich and St. Pauli (1957)
- War of the Maidens (1957)
- Candidates for Marriage (1958)
- Hello Taxi (1958)
- The Street (1958)
- Hunting Party (1959)
- Die Karte mit dem Luchskopf (1963–1965, TV series)
- Sir Roger Casement (1968, TV film)
- Friedrich Ebert – Geburt einer Republik (1969, TV film)
- Friedrich Ebert und Gustav Stresemann, Schicksalsjahre der Republik (1969, TV film)
- Marinemeuterei 1917 (1969, TV film)
- Junger Herr auf altem Hof (1969–1970, TV series)
- Der Fall Sorge (1970, TV film)
- Die Halsbandaffäre (1971, TV film)
- Hallo – Hotel Sacher … Portier! (1973–1974, TV series)

=== Assistant Director ===
- A Hopeless Case (1939)
- Hotel Sacher (1939)
- Renate in the Quartet (1939)
- Nanette (1940)
- Incognito in Paradise (1950)

== Bibliography ==
- Robert von Dassanowsky. Austrian Cinema: A History. McFarland, 2005.
