= Johannes Heesters =

Dutch actor, singer and entertainer (1903–2011)

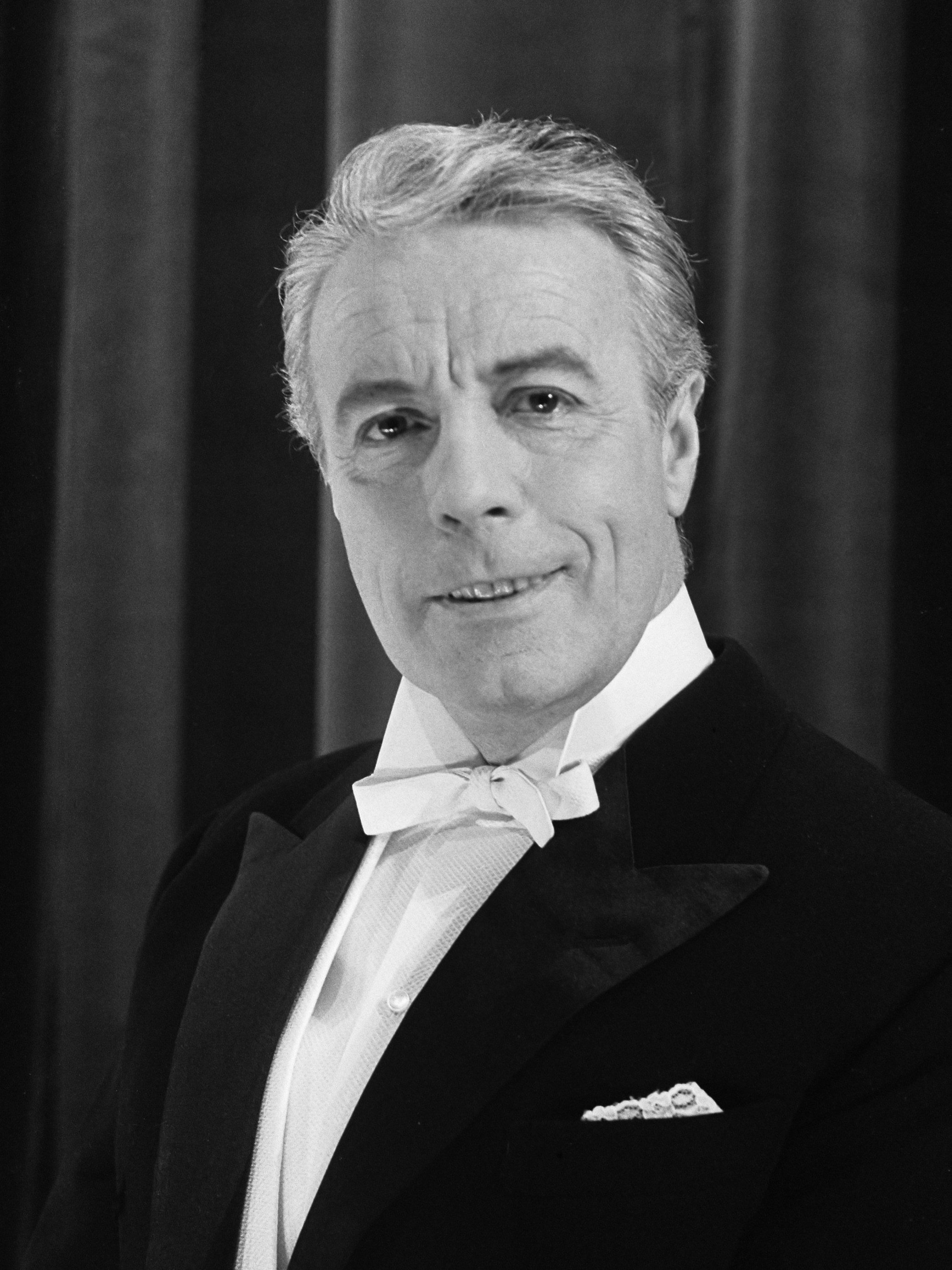
- Heesters in 1964
- Born: 5 December 1903; Amersfoort, Netherlands
- Died: 24 December 2011 (aged 108); Starnberg, Germany
- Resting place: Nordfriedhof, Munich, Germany
- Occupations: Actor; singer
- Years active: 1921–2011
- Spouses: Louisa Ghijs (m. 1930; died 1985) Simone Rethel (m. 1992)
- Children: Wiesje Heesters (born 1931); Nicole Heesters (born 1937)
- Website: www.johannes-heesters.de

Johan Marius Nicolaas Heesters (5 December 1903 – 24 December 2011), known professionally as Johannes Heesters, was a Dutch-German actor of stage, television and film, as well as a vocalist of numerous recordings and performer on the concert stage with a career dating back to the 1920s. He worked as an actor until his death and is probably the oldest performing entertainer in history, performing shortly before his death at the age of 108. Heesters was almost exclusively active in the German-speaking world from the mid-1930s and became a film star in Nazi Germany, which later led to controversy in his native country. He was able to maintain his popularity in Germany in the decades until his death.

== Early life ==
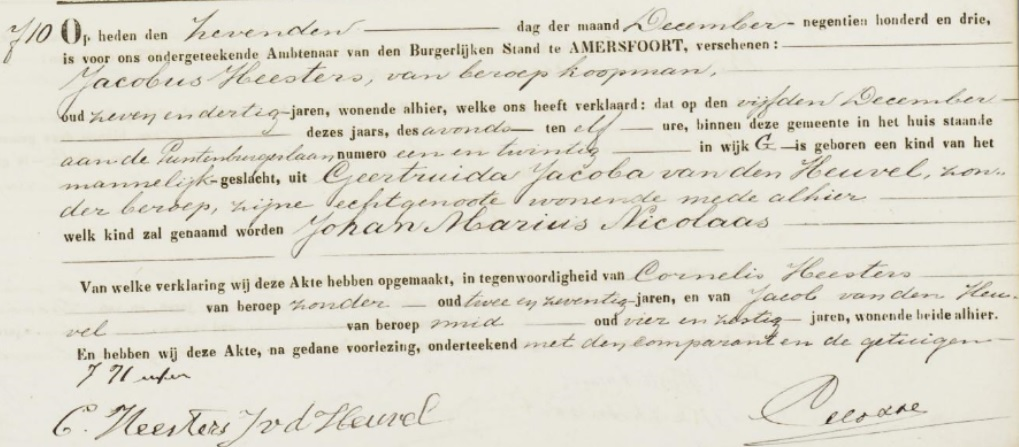
Record of Heesters' birth

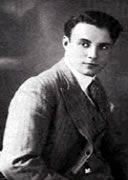
Heesters in 1919

Heesters was born in Amersfoort, Netherlands, the youngest of four sons. His father Jacobus Heesters (1865–1946) was a salesman and his mother Geertruida Jacoba van den Heuvel (1866–1951), a homemaker.

Heesters was fluent in German from an early age, having lived for several years in the household of a German great uncle from Bavaria. Heesters decided to become an actor and a singer at the age of 16 and began vocal training. He specialized in Viennese operetta very early in his career, and made his Viennese stage debut in 1934 in Carl Millöcker's Der Bettelstudent (The Beggar Student).

== Nazi Germany ==
Aged 31, Heesters permanently moved to Germany with his wife and daughters in 1935. His signature role was Count Danilo Danilovich in Franz Lehár's Die Lustige Witwe (The Merry Widow). His version of Count Danilo's entrance song, "Da geh' ich ins Maxim", was well known. During his time in Germany, he performed for Adolf Hitler and visited the Dachau concentration camp, which made him a controversial figure for many Dutch. Joseph Goebbels placed Heesters on the Gottbegnadeten list as an artist considered crucial to Nazi culture; he was the only non-German included.

Heesters funded the German war machine by donating money to the weapons industry. This helped to make him a very controversial figure in the late 1970s. Heesters always denied these acts despite reliable evidence.

He befriended several high-ranking Nazi-officials and SS-officers. Hitler is known to have been an avid admirer of his acting skills.

At the same time, Heesters was idolized by the Swingboy subculture, who admired his pale face and combed long black hair and tried to copy his attire. His style contrasted that promoted by the Hitlerjugend.

Heesters met Hitler several times, especially in the role of Count Danilo. Throughout the war, Heesters continued to perform for German soldiers in camps and barracks. According to German author Volker Kühn, Heesters performed for the SS at the Dachau concentration camp. Kühn cites as evidence the testimony of a Dachau inmate, Viktor Matejka, who worked for the SS and told Kühn he pulled the curtain when Heesters performed in 1941. According to German writer Jürgen Trimborn however, the interview with Matejka may not be reliable as it occurred some 50 years after the performance was said to have taken place.

In December 2009, Heesters lost his libel suit against Kühn. While acknowledging having visited the camp, he denied having performed as entertainment for the SS troops. In its ruling, the German court did not find whether Kühn's allegations were true, but rather that too much time had passed for an accurate determination of fact to be made.

== After the war ==
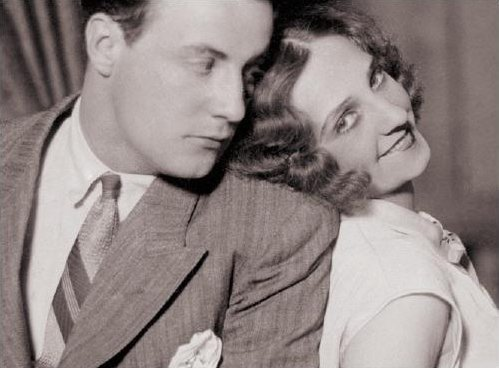
Heesters with his future wife, Louisa Ghijs, in 1928

Heesters worked extensively for UFA until almost the end of the Second World War (his last wartime movie being Die Fledermaus, produced in 1945) and easily made the transition from the Nazi-controlled cultural scene to post-war Germany and Austria, appearing again in a number of films. These included Die Jungfrau auf dem Dach and the 1957 version of Viktor und Viktoria. He stopped making movies around 1960 to concentrate on stage and television appearances and on producing records.

In later years, Heesters spoke fondly of Hitler as a person, but condemned his political stance. In the 1990s, he and his wife toured Germany and Austria with Curth Flatow's play Ein gesegnetes Alter (A Blessed Age), which was also televised in 1996. On 5 December 2003, he celebrated his 100th birthday with a television special Eine Legende wird 100 (A legend turns 100) on the ARD television channel. He received the title "Kammersänger". In December 2004, at the age of 101, Heesters appeared in Stuttgart at the Komödie im Marquardt theatre in a show commissioned on the occasion of his 100th birthday, Heesters – eine musikalische Hommage. In 2005, at the age of 102, he was featured as a soloist in a major concert tour with the Deutsches Filmorchester Babelsberg under the direction of Scott Lawton. On 5 December 2006, Heesters celebrated his 103rd birthday with a concert at the Wiener Konzerthaus. On 5 December 2007, he celebrated his 104th birthday with a concert at the Admiralspalast, Berlin. Then in February 2008, he performed in his home country for the first time in four decades amidst protests against his Nazi associations.

On 13 December 2008, at the age of 105, Heesters apologised for calling Adolf Hitler a "good chap" on the popular German TV show Wetten, dass..?. He stated that he had said something stupid and horrible and asked for forgiveness. German media suggested that he had failed to understand the show's satirical nature.

Heesters played smaller roles in his last years, as he began to lose his eyesight due to macular degeneration and could not perform on stage for long periods of times. Unable to read a teleprompter, he had to memorize his lines before a show. He played in the 2011 short film Ten as Simon Petrus and made his last stage appearance on 31 October 2011 in Munich.

== Personal life ==
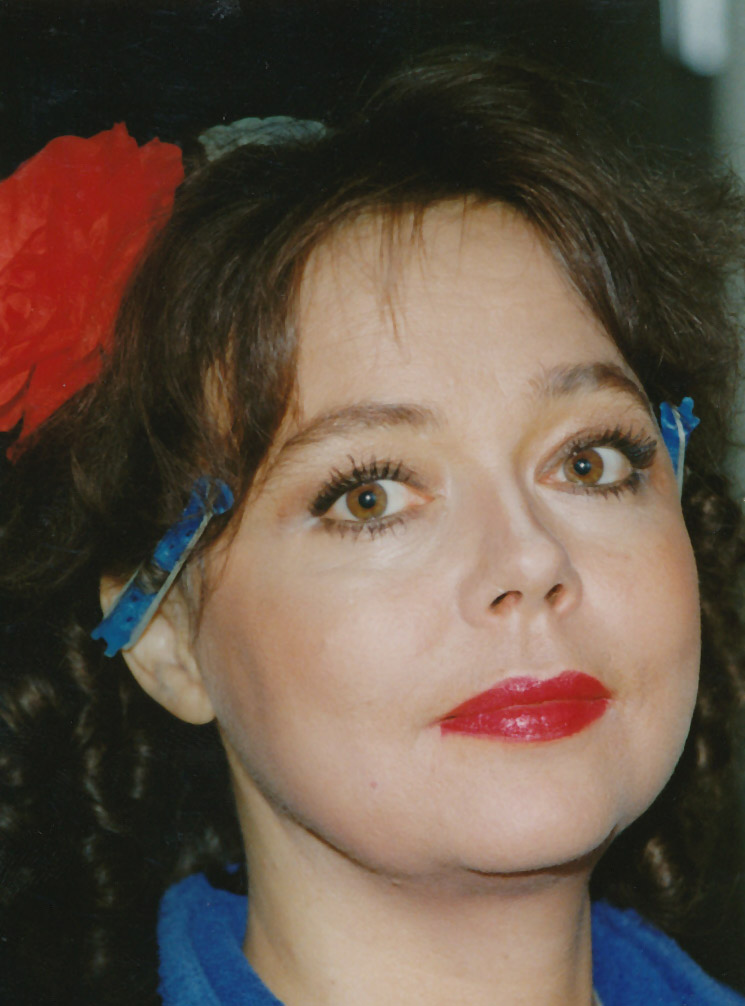
Heesters' second wife Simone Rethel

"My secret to a long, healthy life is love and passion; age differences do not matter."

— Johannes Heesters, December 2010

Heesters had two daughters by his first wife Louisa Ghijs, whom he married in 1930. After her death in 1985, he remarried in 1992. His second wife, Simone Rethel (born 1949), is a German actress, painter, and photographer. His younger daughter Nicole Heesters is a well-known actress in the German-speaking world, as is his granddaughter Saskia Fischer.

On 1 January 2008, he fell down some stairs in his holiday home in Tyrol and broke two ribs.

In December 2010, 107-year-old Heesters announced that he had quit smoking for his then 61-year-old wife: "She should have me as long as possible."

On 31 October 2011, Heesters gave his last public performance at the Bayrischer Hof in Munich. Four weeks later, on 29 November 2011, he developed a fever, and was rushed into the hospital. He was fitted with a heart pacemaker and following a good recovery was allowed to go home less than a week later on 4 December 2011 just in time to spend his 108th birthday the next day with family. He did not feel strong enough to make the planned stage appearance to sing in celebration of his birthday and also had missed the premiere of his last film, Ten. Due to a relapse in his condition, on 17 December he was readmitted to the hospital where he subsequently suffered a stroke, dying on Christmas Eve in 2011. He was survived by two daughters, five grandchildren, eleven great-grandchildren and three great-great-grandchildren.

== Discography ==
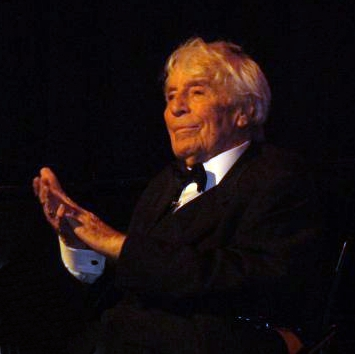
Heesters in 2006

Albums

- 1965: Jetzt geh' ich ins Maxim
- 2003: Ich werde 100 Jahre alt

Singles

- 1937: "Ich werde jede Nacht von ihnen träumen"
- 1939: "Musik, Musik, Musik" (featuring Marika Rökk)
- 1941: "Liebling, was wird nun aus uns beiden"
- 1941: "Man müßte Klavier spielen können"
- 1949: "Das kommt mir spanisch vor"
- 1949: "Tausendmal möchte' ich dich küssen"
- 1998: "Ich werde 100 Jahre alt"
- 2007: "Generationen" (featuring Claus Eisenmann)

== Honours, decorations, awards ==
- 1984: Bavarian Order of Merit
- 1993: Berlinian Order of Merit
- 2000: Ring of Honour of the City of Vienna
- Bambi in 1967, 1987, 1990, 1997, 2003, 2007, 2008, 2009, 2010, 2011
- 2001: Platinum Romy (TV award)
- 2003: Goldene Kamera
- 2004: Kammersänger

== Filmography ==
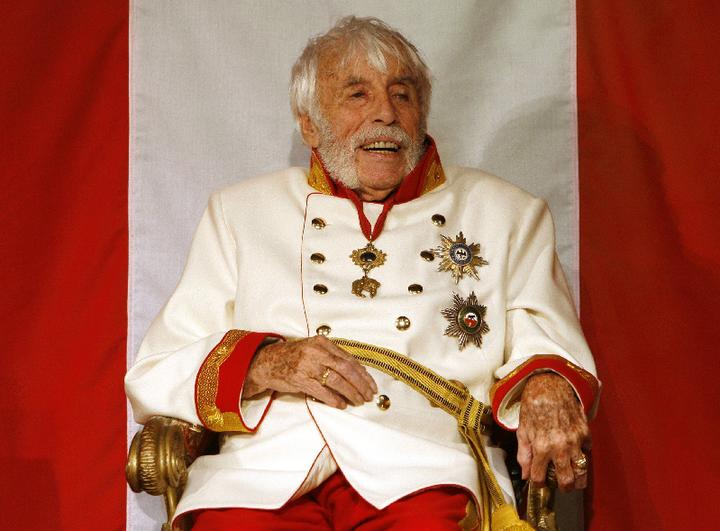
Heesters as Franz Joseph I of Austria (2008)

- Cirque hollandais (1924)
- Bleeke Bet (1934) as Ko Monje
- De Vier Mullers (1935) as Otto Muller, hun zoon
- Everything for the Company (1935)
- The Emperor's Candlesticks (1936) as Grossfürst Peter Alexandrowitsch
- The Beggar Student (1936) as Simon Rymanowics
- The Court Concert (1936) as Lt. Walter van Arnegg
- Die Weltmeisterin (1936)
- When Women Keep Silent (1937) as Curt van Doeren
- Gasparone (1937) as Erminio Bondo
- Nanon (1938) as Marquis Charles d'Aubigne
- Immer wenn ich glücklich bin (1938)
- Das Abenteuer geht weiter (1939) as Heinz van Zeelen
- Hello Janine! (1939) as Count Rene
- My Aunt, Your Aunt (1939) as Peter Larisch
- Liebesschule (1940) as Enrico Villanova, Tenor
- Die lustigen Vagabunden (1940) as Werner Schratt, Schauspieler
- Roses in Tyrol (1940) as Graf Herbert von Waldendorf
- Immer nur Du (1941) as Will Hollers
- Jenny und der Herr im Frack (1941) as Peter Holm
- Illusion (1941) as Stefan von Holtenau
- Carnival of Love (1943) as Tenor Peter Hansen
- Melody of a Great City (1943) as Spielt sich selbst in einer Revue (cameo)
- Es lebe die Liebe (1944) as Manfred
- Glück bei Frauen (1944) as Stefan Hell
- Es fing so harmlos an (1944) as Clemens Verné
- Axel an der Himmelstür (1944) as Axel
- Die Fledermaus (1946) as Herbert Eisenstein
- Renee XIV (1946, unfinished film)
- Wiener Melodien (1947) as Ferry van der Heuvels
- Insolent and in Love (1948) as Dr. Peter Schild, Ingenieur
- Dear Friend (1949) as Adrian van der Steer
- When a Woman Loves (1950) as Martin Pratt
- Wedding Night In Paradise (1950) as Pieter van Goos
- Professor Nachtfalter (1951) as Professor Dr. Joachim Wendler
- Dance Into Happiness (1951) as Pedro Domingo
- The Csardas Princess (1951) as Edwin von Weylersheim
- The White Horse Inn (1952) as Dr. Siedler
- The Moon Is Blue (1953) as Tourist (uncredited)
- Die Jungfrau auf dem Dach (1953) as David Slader
- A Musical War of Love (1953) as Ralph Beyron
- The Divorcée (1953) as Karel
- Hit Parade (1953) as Singer
- If I Only Have Your Love (1953) as Franz von Suppé
- Hello, My Name is Cox (1955) as Paul Cox
- The Star of Rio (1955) as Don Felipe
- Bel Ami (1955) as Georges Duroy genannt Bel Ami
- And Who Is Kissing Me? (1956) as Johannes Heesters
- Opera Ball (1956) as Georg Dannhauser
- My Husband's Getting Married Today (1956) as Robert Petersen
- Victor and Victoria (1957) as Jean Perrot
- Von allen geliebt (1957) as Rudolf Avenarius
- Bühne frei für Marika (1958) as Michael Norman
- Frau im besten Mannesalter (1958) as Bernhard Hauff
- Besuch aus heiterem Himmel (1958) as John Underhower
- Die unvollkommene Ehe (1959) as Professor Paul Lert
- Junge Leute brauchen Liebe (1961) as Charles Fürst
- Otto – Der Film (1985) as Clochard
- Silent Love (1994, Short) as Geigensolist
- 1½ Knights – In Search of the Ravishing Princess Herzelinde (2008) as Wissenschaftler
- Ten (2011, short) as Mr. Peterson (final film role)

=== Television ===
- 1956: Meine Schwester und ich (TV film) - Dr. Roger Fleuriot
- 1960: Am grünen Strand der Spree (TV miniseries) - Graf Chiaroscuro
- 1968: Unsere liebste Freundin (TV film) - Christian Bach-Nielsen
- 1973: Paganini (TV film) - Prince Felice Baciocchi
- 1973: Hallo – Hotel Sacher … Portier!: Opernball (TV series episode) - Marinus de Ryder
- 1974: Hochzeitsnacht im Paradies (TV film) - Dr. Hansen
- 1980: Liebe bleibt nicht ohne Schmerzen (TV film) - Narrator
- 1982: Sonny Boys (TV film) - Al Lewis
- 1984: Beautiful Wilhelmine (TV miniseries) - Marschall Keith
- 1991: Altes Herz wird nochmal jung (TV film)
- 1991-1993: Zwei Münchner in Hamburg (TV series, 33 episodes) - Konsul Thaddäus van Daalen
- 1995: Zwei alte Hasen: Grandhotel (TV series episode) - Jan van Houten
- 1996: Ein gesegnetes Alter (TV film)
- 1999: Theater: Momo (TV film) - Meister Hora
- 2001: Otto – Mein Ostfriesland und mehr
- 2003: In aller Freundschaft: Zurück ins Leben (TV series episode) - Prof. Dr. Junghans
- 2008: Wege zum Glück (TV series episode) - Arbeitgeber Johannes Heesters
