= The Hunter's Cross =

1954 film

- Directed by: Hermann Kugelstadt
- Written by: Johannes Kai; Hermann Kugelstadt
- Produced by: Richard König
- Starring: Jester Naefe; Armin Dahlen; Wera Frydtberg
- Cinematography: Günther Rittau
- Edited by: Luise Dreyer-Sachsenberg
- Music by: Werner Bochmann
- Production company: König Film
- Distributed by: Kopp-Filmverleih
- Release date: 24 September 1954
- Running time: 92 minutes
- Country: West Germany
- Language: German

The Hunter's Cross (German: Das Kreuz am Jägersteig) is a 1954 West German drama film directed by Hermann Kugelstadt and starring Jester Naefe, Armin Dahlen and Wera Frydtberg. It was part of the heimatfilm tradition, which was at its peak as this time.

The film's sets were designed by the art director Max Seefelder. It was shot at the Bavaria Studios in Munich and on location in Mittenwald.

== Cast ==
- Jester Naefe as Dagmar Kobbe
- Armin Dahlen as Andreas
- Wera Frydtberg as Frani Kilian
- Albert Hehn as Gastwirt Michael
- Gert Fröbe as Kobbe
- Franz Muxeneder as Philipp
- Beppo Brem as Knecht Beppo
- Michl Lang as Kilian
- Bobby Todd as Dr. Specht
- Charlott Daudert as Pauline
- Hans Hermann Schaufuß as Emil
- Georg Bauer as Stefan Jäger
- Bertl Schultes as Bürgermeister
- Hans von Morhart as Ein Ingenieur
- Cordula Grun as Dienstmädchen
- Rosl Kern-Schultes as Marilre Magd
- Angelika Meissner as Ursula Andreas Schwester

== Bibliography ==
- Willi Höfig. Der deutsche Heimatfilm 1947–1960. F. Enke, 1973.
