= Emil Vorster =

German racing driver and entrepreneur

Emil "Teddy" Vorster (12 April 1910 – 10 May 1976) was a German racing driver and entrepreneur, so-called gentleman-racing driver and motorsport-functionary. The silk-manufacturer (owner/general manager of C. C. bang Silk weaving) of Rheydt Emil Vorster is known size of German autosports scene before and after the World War II. With a British brand MG Cars and vehicles of the German manufacturer AFM, he participated successfully in many races. From the end of 1947, in early 1948 he was the driving force behind the project Grenzlandring (border-region ring), until this forever has been blocked after the fatal crash with 13 or 14 dead and 42 wounded on 31 August 1952, as a track. Vorster's own active career ended by mid-1949 after he suffered a serious accident at the Aachen Forest race in Aachen where a spectator killed had come and at least three others were injured.

From 1962 to 1975, the co-founder and long-time Chairman of the Rheydt sports clubs for Motorsport (RCM) was the President of the German Motorsport Association (DMV) and Hans Stuck replaced his predecessor in this role. Vorster was among other things on the international motorsport stage as Honorary Deputy President (GER. Honorary Vice-President) Fédération Internationale de Motocyclisme (FIM) and awarded the Order of Merit of the Federal Republic of Germany.

Emil Vorster's fourth and final wife was the actress Ruth Lommel who had a film career in the 1940s and 1950s. She was the daughter of Ludwig Manfred Lommel and sister of actor and director Ulli Lommel and cinematographer Manuel Lommel).
