= Wedding Night in Paradise (1962 film) =

- Austrian film poster
- German: Hochzeitsnacht im Paradies
- Directed by: Paul Martin
- Written by: Heinz Hentschke (libretto); Ernst Marischka
- Produced by: Herbert Gruber; Karl Schwetter
- Starring: Peter Alexander; Marika Rökk; Waltraut Haas
- Cinematography: Friedl Behn-Grund
- Edited by: Arnfried Heyne
- Music by: Friedrich Schröder (operetta)
- Production company: Sascha Film
- Distributed by: Sascha Film (Austria); Gloria Film (W. Germany)
- Release date: 30 August 1962
- Running time: 104 minutes
- Country: Austria
- Language: German

Wedding Night in Paradise (German: Hochzeitsnacht im Paradies) is a 1962 Austrian musical comedy film directed by Paul Martin and starring Peter Alexander, Marika Rökk and Waltraut Haas. Along with a number of films of the era it also features a performance by the Kessler Sisters.

It is an operetta film based on the 1942 stage work of the same title. A previous film adaptation had been made in 1950.

The film was made with backing from the West German distributor Gloria Film. It was shot at the Sievering Studios in Vienna and on location in Venice. The film's sets were designed by Fritz Jüptner-Jonstorff and Alexander Sawczynski. It was made using Eastmancolor.

== Cast ==
- Peter Alexander as Dr. Ulrich Hansen
- Marika Rökk as Ilonka Davarosch
- Waltraut Haas as Regine Roeders
- Gunther Philipp as Felix Bröckelmann
- Hubert von Meyerinck as Gustav Säuerling
- Fred Liewehr as Otto Roeders
- Rudolf Carl as Romano Biangetti
- Karl Ehmann
- Else Rambausek as the maid
- Josef Menschik as food carrier
- Viktor Gschmeidler as registrar
- Alice Kessler as Tilli
- Ellen Kessler as Milli
- Karl Habermann as Lohndiener
- Hans Habietinek as headwaiter
- Peter Machac as young waiter
- Rudi Schippel as wardrober
- Elisabeth Wrede as wardrober
