= To Be Without Worries =

1953 film

- Directed by: Georg Marischka
- Written by: Johann Nestroy (play); Georg Marischka; Hans Weigel
- Produced by: Günther Stapenhorst
- Starring: Walter Müller; Hans Moser; Walter Koch
- Cinematography: Friedl Behn-Grund
- Edited by: Irene Tomschik
- Music by: Oscar Straus
- Production company: Carlton Film
- Distributed by: International Film
- Release date: 22 May 1953
- Running time: 88 minutes
- Countries: Austria; West Germany
- Language: German

To Be Without Worries (German: Einmal keine Sorgen haben) is a 1953 Austrian-German historical comedy film directed by Georg Marischka and starring Walter Müller, Hans Moser and Walter Koch. It was shot at the Schönbrunn Studios in Vienna. The film's sets were designed by the art directors Fritz Jüptner-Jonstorff and Alexander Sawczynski.

== Cast ==
- Walter Müller as Weinberl
- Hans Moser as Melchior
- Walter Koch as Christopherl
- Nadja Tiller as Frau von Fischer
- Wera Frydtberg as Marie
- Paula Pfluger as Madame Knorr
- Alma Seidler as Frau Blumenblatt
- Fritz Imhoff as Herr Zangler
- Ernst Stankovski as Herr Sanders
- Helmut Qualtinger as Kraps
- Hugo Gottschlich as Rab
- Heinz Conrads
- Hertha Martin as Philippine
- Ady Berber as Wachmann Nestroy
- Ena Valduga
- Martin Costa
- Fritz Muliar
- Erich Dörner
- Elvira Weigel as Lisette
- Michael Kehlmann

== Bibliography ==
- Fritsche, Maria. Homemade Men in Postwar Austrian Cinema: Nationhood, Genre and Masculinity. Berghahn Books, 2013.
