= Wera Frydtberg =

German actress (1926–2008)

- Born: 11 August 1926; Freiburg im Breisgau, Germany
- Died: 16 June 2008 (aged 81); Munich, Germany
- Other name: Wera Urbach
- Occupation: Actress
- Years active: 1951–2006
- Children: Karina Urbach

Wera Frydtberg (11 August 1926 – 16 June 2008) was a German film and television actress. She appeared in I Often Think of Piroschka (1955) Her best known film Wir Wunderkinder (known in English as Aren’t We Wonderful?) won the Golden Globe for the most successful International Picture in 1960 and the Golden Medal at the Moscow International Film Festival.

== Biography ==
Wera Frydtberg was born in Freiburg, Germany in 1926. She started her career in 1947 at the Stuttgart theatre and then moved to the Josefstadt theatre in Vienna. From 1951 she starred in 30 major films and over 100 television productions. She was the mother of historian Karina Urbach.

== Selected filmography ==
- The Sinner (1951)
- Father Needs a Wife (1952)
- Under the Stars of Capri (1953)
- To Be Without Worries (1953)
- She (1954)
- The Great Lola (1954)
- The Hunter's Cross (1954)
- The Forest House in Tyrol (1955)
- Her First Date (1955)
- I Often Think of Piroschka (1955)
- Der Etappenhase (1957)
- The Big Chance (1957)
- The Crammer (1958)
- My Ninety Nine Brides (1958)
- Wir Wunderkinder (1958)
- The Scarlet Baroness (1959)
- Das Land des Lächelns (1961)
- With Best Regards (1963)
- Don't Fool with Me (1963)
- Sechs Stunden Angst (TV) (1964)
- Sie schreiben mit - Ein schwarzer Tag (TV Series) (1964)
- Sie schreiben mit - Aus heiterem Himmel (TV) (1965)
- Gewagtes Spiel - Over 70 times (TV Series) (1965)
- Der Zug der Zeit (TV) (1967)
- Love, Vampire Style (1970)
- Der Kommissar – Traum eines Wahnsinnigen (1970)
- Der Kommissar – Der Tod von Karin W. (1973)
- Preussenkorso Nr. 17 (TV) (1974)
- PS – Geschichten ums Auto (1975)
- Eurogang - Die letzte Lieferung (1975)
- Mein Onkel Theodor (1975)
- Neptun und Isolde (TV) (1992)
- München 7 (2006)

== Bibliography ==
- Goble, Alan. The Complete Index to Literary Sources in Film. Walter de Gruyter, 1999.
