= Clara Tabody =

Hungarian actress, singer and dancer

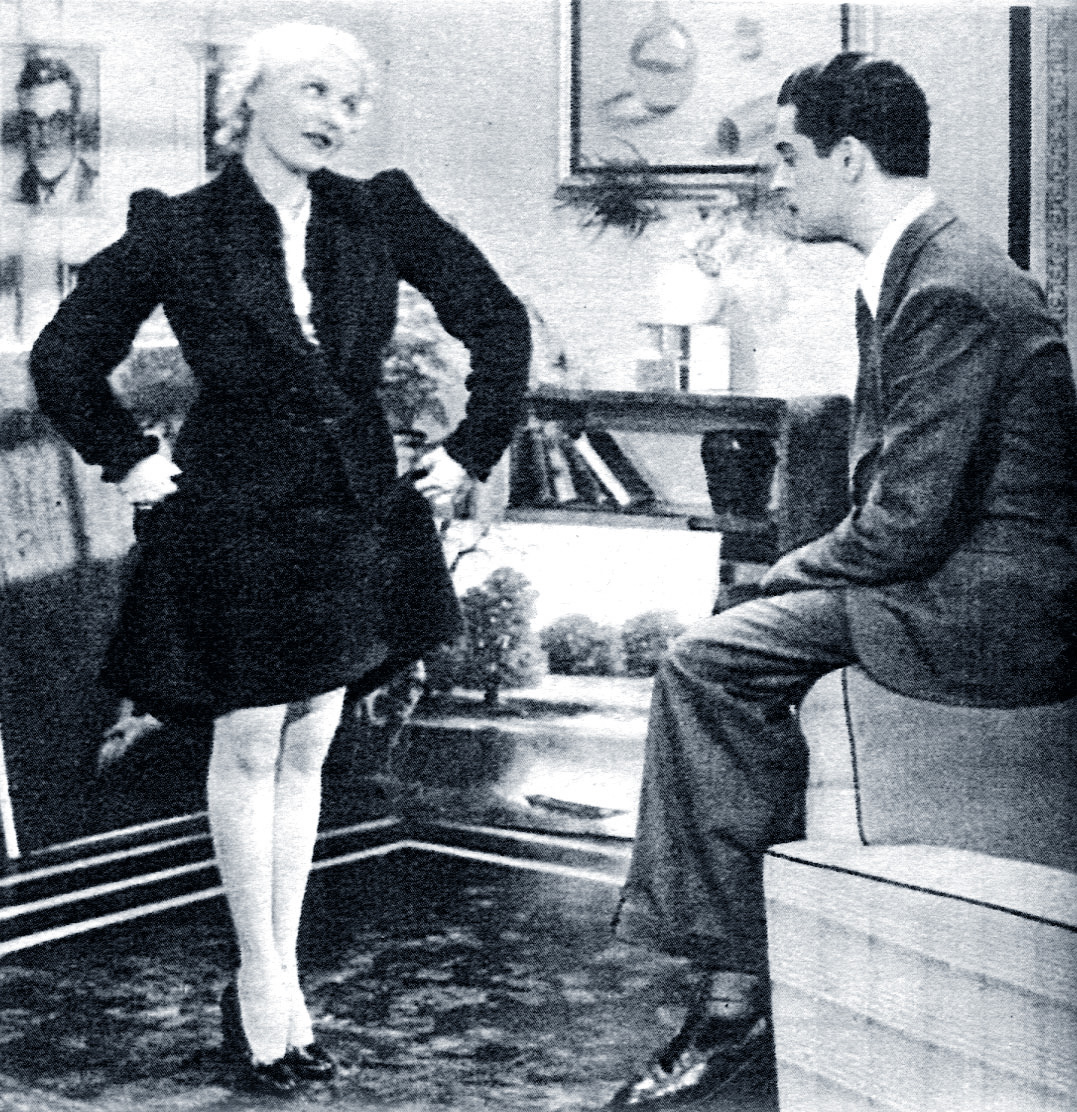
- Clara Tabody in the 1937 Italian film The Carnival Is Here Again
- Born: Klára Lívia Thurmayer; 12 January 1915; Rákospalota, Austro-Hungarian Empire
- Died: 6 August 1986 (aged 71); Milan, Lombardy, Italy
- Occupations: Actress; singer

Clara Tabody (born Klára Lívia Thurmayer) (12 January 1915 – 6 August 1986) was a Hungarian actress, singer and dancer. She starred in both the stage version of the operetta Mask in Blue and its 1943 film adaptation.

She worked for many years in Germany where at one point the studio Tobis Film briefly tried to build her up as a rival to her fellow Hungarian Marika Rökk, then working for UFA. After marrying an Italian she principally settled in that country.

Her sister Ida Turay was also an actress, known for her starring roles in Hungarian films.

== Selected filmography ==
- The Carnival Is Here Again (1937)
- The Hussar Captain (1940)
- Left-Handed Angel (1941)
- Bravo Acrobat! (1943)
- Mask in Blue (1943)

== Bibliography ==
- Noack, Frank. Veit Harlan: The Life and Work of a Nazi Filmmaker. University Press of Kentucky, 2016.
