= Louisa Ghijs =

Belgian stage actress (1902–1985)

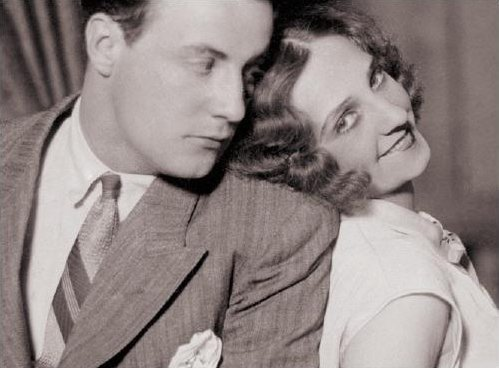
- Ghijs and her future husband Johannes Heesters in 1928
- Born: Ludovica Ghijs; 19 March 1902; Brussels, Belgium
- Died: 18 July 1985 (aged 83); Bavaria, Germany
- Other name: Wiesje Ghijs
- Occupation: Actress
- Years active: 1914–1935
- Spouse: Johannes Heesters (m. 1930)
- Children: Wiesje Heesters (b. 1931); Nicole Heesters (b. 1937)

Ludovica "Louisa" Ghijs (19 March 1902 – 18 July 1985) was a Belgian stage actress. She was married to Dutch-German actor Johannes Heesters.

Ghijs met Heesters in 1928, they married in 1930, and had two daughters Wiesje (1931), nowadays a pianist in Vienna, and Nicole (1937) who became an actress. One of her grandchildren is also an actress: Saskia Fischer (born 1966). In 1935, she played in her last movie, De vier Mullers, alongside her husband. She died in Bavaria, Germany.

== Popular culture ==
Ghijs was the inspiration for Wiske ("Suzy") in the Belgian comic series Suske en Wiske (English: Spike and Suzy).
