= Bravo Acrobat! =

1943 film

- Scene from a film
- German: Akrobat Schööön!
- Directed by: Wolfgang Staudte
- Written by: Wolfgang Staudte
- Produced by: Werner Malbran
- Starring: Charlie Rivel; Clara Tabody; Karl Schönböck
- Cinematography: Georg Bruckbauer
- Edited by: Eva Kroll
- Music by: Paul Hühn; Friedrich Schröder
- Production company: Tobis Film
- Distributed by: Deutsche Filmvertriebs
- Release date: 1 December 1943
- Running time: 85 minutes
- Country: Germany
- Language: German

Bravo Acrobat! (German: Akrobat Schööön!) is a 1943 German comedy film directed by Wolfgang Staudte and starring Charlie Rivel, Clara Tabody, and Karl Schönböck. A circus clown rises to stardom. The film was loosely based on the Spanish-born Rivel's own life.

It was shot at the Johannisthal Studios in Berlin and on location around the city. The film's sets were designed by the art director Erich Grave.

== Plot ==
Charlie, an aging acrobat and clown, shares a modest attic apartment with Monika, a young singer and dancer. Both hope to establish successful stage careers. When Monika auditions for the Tabarin variety theater, its director hires Charlie only as a stagehand, while she becomes the partner of the theater's star performer, Orlando. After Charlie loses his job and is demoted to night watchman, he begins performing alone after hours. His act attracts the attention of Bibiana, an unemployed trapeze artist, and they plan a joint performance. Although Charlie is fired after the director catches them rehearsing, an injury to another performer gives them an unexpected opportunity to appear in a new show. When a rotating stage brings Charlie, Bibiana, and trapeze artist Fred Martoni into the spotlight by accident, they improvise a successful act that launches Charlie's career. Meanwhile, Monika and Orlando become engaged.

== Cast ==
- Charlie Rivel as Charlie
- Clara Tabody as Monika
- Karl Schönböck as Orlando
- Käthe Dyckhoff as Bibiana
- Hans Hermann Schaufuß as Krause
- Fritz Kampers as Roto
- Werner Scharf as Fred Martoni
- Einar Björling as Bruno Martoni
- Nina Raven-Zoch as Lydia
- Hans Junkermann as director
- Henry Lorenzen as Secretary
- Adolf Ziegler as theater director
- Oskar Höcker as Stage master
- Karl Kahlmann as Variete servant
- Edgar Pauly as doorman
- Hella Thornegg as property attendant
- Klaus Puhlmann as Peter
- Herta Worell as Mother
- Walter Schramm-Duncker as man with bass voice
- Karin Luesebrink as secretary #1
- Ursula Herking as secretary #2
- Rello Marlo as Artiste
- Heinz Wemper as First stageworker
- Armin Munch as Language instructor and first guest
- Ruth Buchardt as Elegant lady
- Karl Heinz Reichel as Assistant director
- Heinz Denies as Monica's dancing partner
- Jockel Stahl as Monica's dancing partner
- Charly Berger as Theatre employee
- Angelo Ferrari as Restaurant patron
- Meta Weber as Charlie's maid
- Bela Kremo
