= Karina Urbach =

German historian with a special interest in Nazi Germany (1933–45)

Dr. habil. Karina Urbach
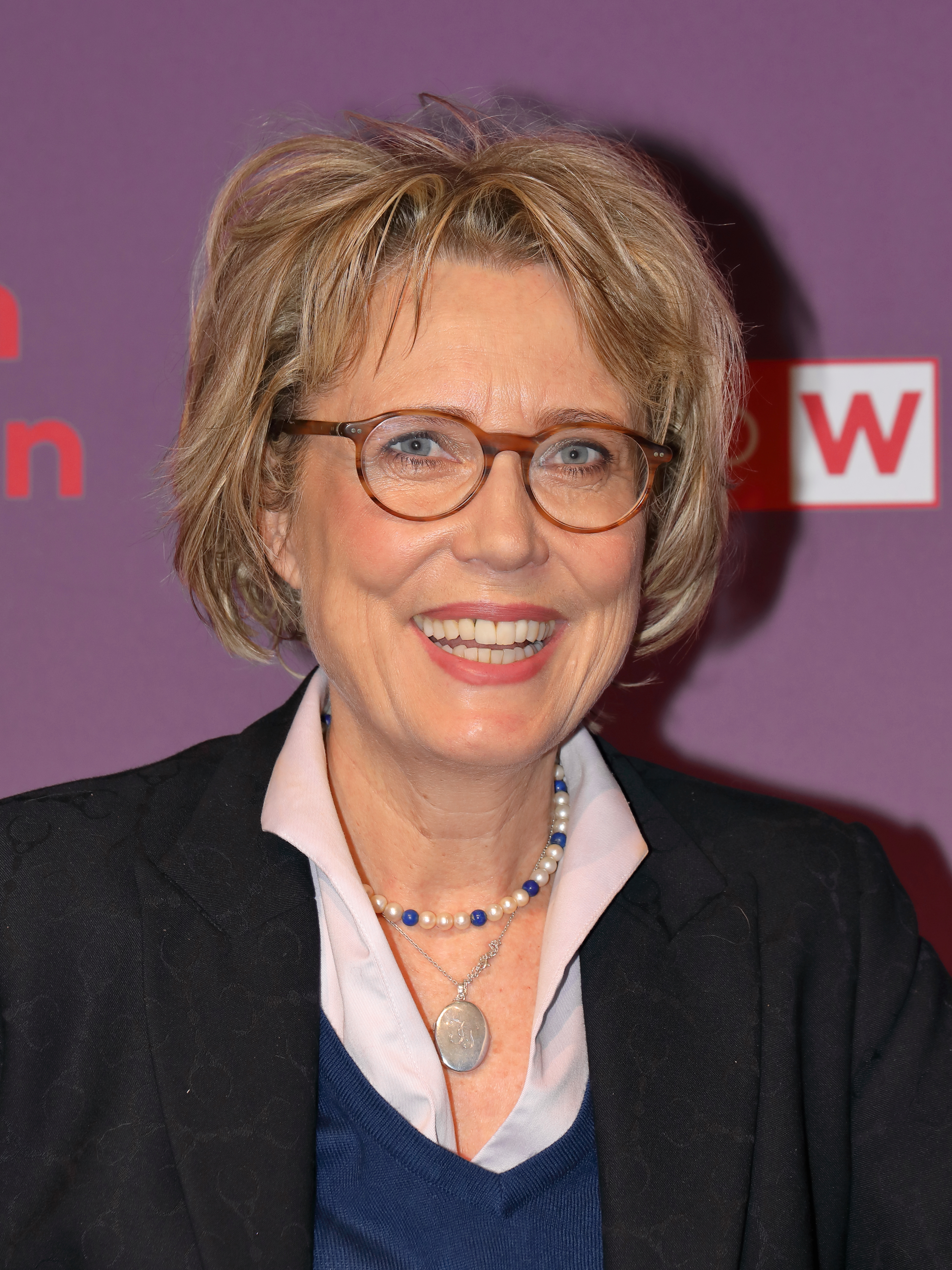
- Education: University of Bayreuth; University of Cambridge; LMU Munich
- Occupations: Historian, researcher, professor
- Employer: University of London
- Title: Senior Research Fellow
- Mother: Wera Frydtberg
- Awards: German Academic Exchange Service Scholarship; Bayerischer Habilitationsförderpreis
- Website: www.karinaurbach.org.uk

Karina Urbach bibliography
- Books↙: 8
- Articles↙: 27
- Interviews↙: 2
- Books edited↙: 7

Karina Urbach is a German historian with a special interest in the Nazi period (1933–45). She has written several books on 19th and 20th century European political and cultural history.

Urbach is currently researching American intelligence operations against the National Socialists in wartime and postwar.

== Education and career ==
Urbach was a Kurt Hahn Scholar at the University of Cambridge where she took her MPhil in International Relations (1992) and her PhD in history (1996). For her German Habilitation she was awarded the Bavarian Ministry of Culture prize. She taught at the University of Bayreuth, was a Research Fellow at the German Historical Institute London (2004-2009) and thereafter at the Institute of Historical Research, University of London.

Urbach is a board member of the Otto-von-Bismarck Foundation. In 2015 she became a long term visitor at the Institute for Advanced Study, Princeton, New Jersey.

In 2015 Urbach took part in uncovering a 1934 film clip of a young princess Elizabeth making the Nazi salute. She has since then been campaigning with The Times and The Guardian for the release of Interwar period material from the royal archives. In 2020 she published Das Buch Alice (Alice's Book). The story of her grandmother Alice Urbach, a Jewish chef in Vienna whose bestselling cookbook was expropriated by the Nazis. Karina Urbach discovered that Alice was not the only Jewish author who had been replaced by an ‘Aryan’ stooge. Alice never saw her book published again under her name, but in 2020 the German magazine Der Spiegel ran a story about the findings of Alice's Book. As a consequence, Alice's publishing house issued a reprint. The English language version of Alice's Book appeared in May 2022, published by MacLehose Press and translated by Jamie Bulloch.

Urbach has worked as historical adviser on many BBC, PBS and German TV documentaries. She has contributed articles to the Wall Street Journal, The Guardian, The Literary Review, Die Zeit, Die Frankfurter Allgemeine (FAZ) and Die Tageszeitung (TAZ).

In 2017 Urbach published the historical novel Cambridge 5 under the pseudonym Hannah Coler. It was shortlisted for the Friedrich Glauser prize and won the Crime Cologne Award in 2018.

Urbach is the daughter of the actress Wera Frydtberg.

== Bibliography ==
=== Monographs ===
- Alice's Book: How the Nazis stole my grandmother's cookbook, London 2022, ISBN 978-1529416305
- Das Buch Alice. Wie die Nazis das Kochbuch meiner Großmutter raubten, Berlin 2020, ISBN 978-3549100080
- Go Betweens for Hitler, Oxford University Press, 2015
- German translation: Hitlers heimliche Helfer, Darmstadt, 2016
- Queen Victoria, A Biography, C.H. Beck, Munich 2011 (third edition 2014)
- Bismarck's Favourite Englishman. Lord Odo Russell's Mission to Berlin, Tauris Academic Press, London and New York, 1999

=== Edited books ===
- with Ulrich Lappenküper (eds.), Realpolitik für Europa: Bismarcks Weg, Paderborn, 2016
- with Franz Bosbach, John Davis (eds.), Common Heritage, Documents and Sources concerning German-British Relations in the Archives and Collections of Windsor and Coburg, Vol. I, 2015, Vol. II, 2017
- with Jonathan Haslam (eds.), Secret Intelligence and the International Relations of Europe in the 20thC, Stanford University Press, 2013
- with Brendan Simms (eds.), Bringing Personality back in: Leadership and War. A British-German Comparison 1740-1945, Munich, 2010
- Royal Kinship. British and German Family Networks 1815-1914, Munich, 2008
- European Aristocracies and the Radical Right in the Interwar Period, Oxford University Press, 2007
- with Franz Bosbach and Keith Robbins (eds.), Birth or Talent ? The Formation of Elites in a British-German Comparison, Munich, 2003

=== Fiction ===
- Cambridge 5, Limes/Random House 2017
