= Between Munich and St. Pauli =

1957 film directed by Hermann Kugelstadt

- Directed by: Hermann Kugelstadt
- Written by: Hans H. König; L.A.C. Müller
- Produced by: Richard König
- Starring: Joe Stöckel; Beppo Brem; Lucie Englisch
- Cinematography: Klaus König; Günther Rittau
- Edited by: Luise Dreyer-Sachsenberg
- Music by: Werner Bochmann
- Production company: König Film
- Distributed by: Kopp-Filmverleih
- Release date: 18 October 1957
- Running time: 99 minutes
- Country: West Germany
- Language: German

Between Munich and St. Pauli or The Jolly Detectives (German: Zwischen München und St. Pauli or Die fidelen Detektive) is a 1957 West German comedy crime film directed by Hermann Kugelstadt and starring Joe Stöckel, Beppo Brem and Ernst Waldow.

The film's sets were designed by the art director Hans Sohnle. It was shot on location around Munich and Hamburg.

== Synopsis ==
Two recently retired Munich traffic policemen are bored and so decide to solve an open case in order to claim the reward. They join forces with a private detective who is also after the reward.

== Cast ==
- Joe Stöckel as Alois Gallenmüller
- Beppo Brem as Toni Wimser
- Ernst Waldow as Willibald Knaake
- Lucie Englisch as Fanny Gallenmüller
- Ethel Reschke as Frau Hanselmann
- Vera Hösch as Christel Gallenmüller
- Peter Schwerdt as Kurt Knaake
- Wolfried Lier as Benno Weissmantel
- Ruth Lommel as Lilo Weissmantel
- Viktor Afritsch as Rufus Palmer
- Ruth Drexel as Urschel
- Rolf von Nauckhoff as Polizeikommissar in Hamburg
- Beppo Schwaiger as Polizeikommissar in München

== Bibliography ==
- Bergfelder, Tim & Bock, Hans-Michael. The Concise Cinegraph: Encyclopedia of German. Berghahn Books, 2009.
