= Ich werde 100 Jahre alt =

Studio album by Johannes Heesters
- Released: December 1, 2003
- Recorded: 30s, 40s and 90s
- Genre: Schlager
- Label: Sony BMG
- Producer: Jack White

Johannes Heesters chronology
Jetzt geh' ich ins Maxim (1965)	Ich werde 100 Jahre alt (2003)

Ich werde 100 Jahre alt (I'll turn 100 Years) is a studio album by the Dutch singer and actor Johannes Heesters with only one single. It is the best selling album from Heesters.

== Track listing ==
1. "Ich werde 100 Jahre alt" – 3:37
2. "Ein bisschen Liebe gehört zum Leben" – 0:30
3. "Hochzeitsnacht im Paradis (1)" – 2:53
4. "Hochzeitsnacht im Paradis (2)" – 2:56
5. "Bist du's lachendes Glück?" – 0:42
6. "Mein Auto kann schön singen" – 0:24
7. "Eine nach der Anderen" – 3:50
8. "Über die Prärie" [only ringtone] – 0:03
9. "Sehnsucht nach dir" – 3:06
10. "Angelika Senerade" – 2:55
11. "Sweetheart (will you remember me)" – 3:05
12. "Ich werde jede Nacht von ihnen Träumen" – 0:25
13. "Besame Mucho" – 0:02
14. "Das kommt mir spanisch vor" – 3:07
15. "Ich werde 100 Jahre alt [other version] – 3:37
16. "Die Kraft meines Lebens" – 3:37
17. bonus track since September 2004: "Ciao"

== Charts ==
Chart (2003)	Peak position
Austrian Albums (Ö3 Austria)	70
German Albums (Offizielle Top 100)	19
