= Jester Naefe =

- Born: 12 September 1924; Vienna, Austria
- Died: 6 July 1967 (aged 42); Geretsried, Bavaria, West Germany
- Occupation: Actress
- Years active: 1949-1957 (film)

Jester Naefe (1924–1967) was an Austrian stage and film actress. She became a leading star of German cinema in the 1950s, but was forced to retire at the height of her fame due to illness.

== Filmography ==
| Year | Title | Role | Notes |
|---|---|---|---|
| 1949 | I'll Never Forget That Night | Yvonne Rödern | |
| 1949 | The Prisoner | Nanette | |
| 1949 | Das Fräulein und der Vagabund | Bettina Rödern | |
| 1949 | Who Is This That I Love? | Beatrix | |
| 1954 | The Little Town Will Go to Sleep | Ingrid Altmann | |
| 1954 | The Hunter's Cross | Dagmar Kobbe | |
| 1954 | The Confession of Ina Kahr | Cora Brink | |
| 1955 | The Spanish Fly | Hannelore Klinke | |
| 1955 | The Star of Rio | Dina | |
| 1955 | Mamitschka | Rosa | |
| 1955 | The Congress Dances | Lydia | |
| 1955 | Your Life Guards | Rita Lamberti | |
| 1955 | Sonnenschein und Wolkenbruch | | |
| 1956 | The Golden Bridge | Ann | |
| 1956 | Das Liebesleben des schönen Franz | Christa, deren Tochter | |
| 1956 | Lumpazivagabundus | Signora Palpiti | |
| 1957 | Sand, Love and Salt | Vida | (final film role) |

== Bibliography ==
- Fritsche, Maria. Homemade Men in Postwar Austrian Cinema: Nationhood, Genre and Masculinity. Berghahn Books, 2013.
