= Die Karte mit dem Luchskopf =

German television series

- Directed by: Hermann Kugelstadt
- Starring: Kai Fischer
- Country of origin: Germany

Die Karte mit dem Luchskopf is a German television series.

== See also ==
- List of German television series
