= Saskia Fischer =

German actress

Saskia Fischer (born 1966) is a German actress who began her career in 1991. She is the daughter of Nicole Heesters and the granddaughter of famous actors Johannes Heesters and Louisa Ghijs. Fischer has lived since 2002 with actor Mario Ramos in Hamburg with whom she has a son.

== Filmography ==
- 1991: Altes Herz wieder jung
- 1993: Sylter Geschichten
- 2001: Wilsberg – Wilsberg und der Schuss im Morgengrauen
- 2002: [[Schlosshote

l Orth]]

- 2002: Broti & Pacek – Irgendwas ist immer
- 2002–2008: Tatort
- 2003: Doppelter Einsatz – Heiße Fracht
- 2003: Traumprinz in Farbe
- 2005: Die unlösbaren Fälle des Herrn Sand
- 2006: Meine Mutter tanzend
- 2006: Paulas Sommer
- 2007: Küstenwache
- 2007: Ein Fall für zwei
- 2007– : Großstadtrevier
- 2008: Da kommt Kalle
- 2009: Fünf Tage Vollmond
