= Imperial and Royal Field Marshal =

Imperial and Royal Field Marshal may refer to:

- Imperial and Royal Field Marshal (1930 film), a Czechoslovak comedy film
- Imperial and Royal Field Marshal (1956 film), an Austrian historical comedy film
