= Ruth Lommel =

German actress (1918–2012)

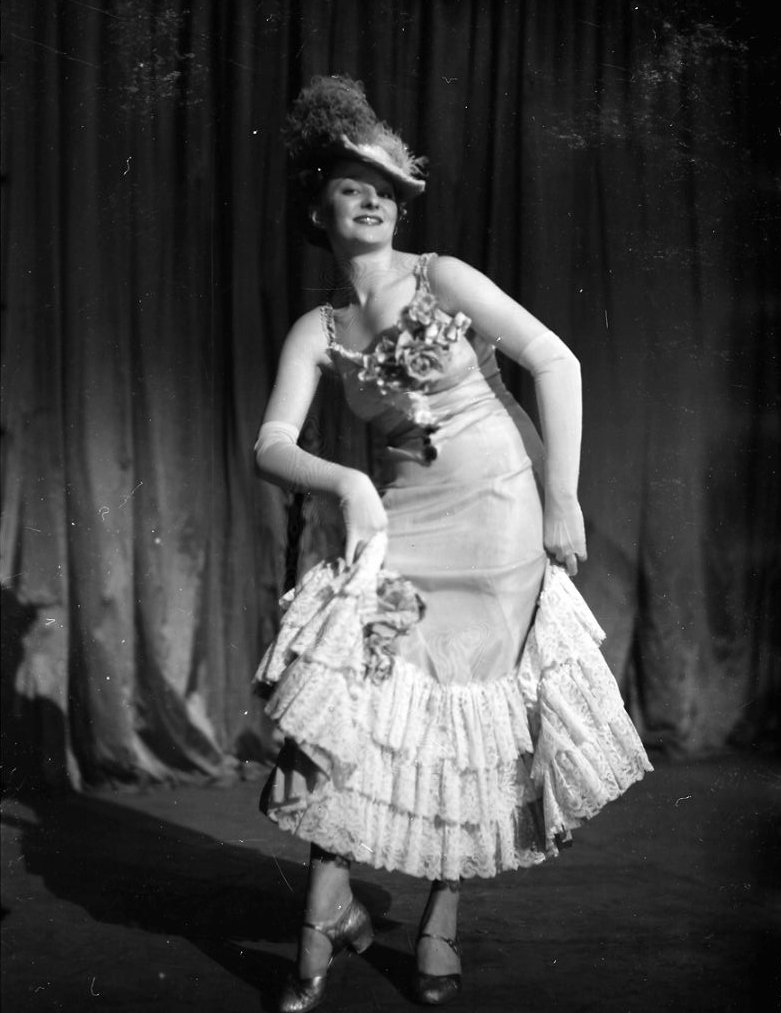
- Lommel in 1937
- Born: 6 May 1918; Breslau, Silesia, German Empire
- Died: 22 June 2012 (aged 94); Mönchengladbach, North Rhine-Westphalia, Germany
- Occupation: Actress
- Years active: 1939–1958 (film)

Ruth Lommel (1918–2012) was a German stage and film actress. She was the daughter of the actor Ludwig Manfred Lommel. Her brother Ulli Lommel also became an actor, while another brother Manuel Lommel is a cinematographer.

She was married to the racing driver Emil Vorster.

== Selected filmography ==
- The Unfaithful Eckehart (1940)
- Riding for Germany (1941)
- The Swedish Nightingale (1941)
- The Big Game (1942)
- Light of Heart (1943)
- Heart of Stone (1950)
- When Men Cheat (1950)
- Harbour Melody (1950)
- The Mill in the Black Forest (1953)
- Hooray, It's a Boy! (1953)
- The Immenhof Girls (1955)
- Two Bavarians in St. Pauli (1956)
- Between Munich and St. Pauli (1957)
- The Muzzle (1958)

== Bibliography ==
- Giesen, Rolf. Nazi Propaganda Films: A History and Filmography. McFarland, 2003.
