= Hallo – Hotel Sacher ... Portier! =

Austrian television series

- Directed by: Hermann Kugelstadt
- Starring: Fritz Eckhardt
- Country of origin: Austria

Production
- Running time: 60 minutes

Hallo – Hotel Sacher … Portier! is an Austrian television series.

== See also ==
- List of Austrian television series
