= Mask in Blue (1953 film) =

1953 film

- German: Maske in Blau
- Directed by: Georg Jacoby
- Written by: Fritz Böttger; Walter Forster; Heinz Hentschke (operetta); Joachim Wedekind
- Produced by: Max G. Hüske; Georg Jacoby
- Starring: Marika Rökk; Paul Hubschmid; Wilfried Seyferth
- Cinematography: Bruno Mondi
- Edited by: Lilian Seng; Walter von Bonhorst
- Music by: Fred Raymond
- Production companies: Bavaria Film; Röja Film
- Distributed by: Herzog Film
- Release date: 26 February 1953
- Running time: 99 minutes
- Country: West Germany
- Language: German

Mask in Blue (German: Maske in Blau) is a 1953 West German musical film directed by Georg Jacoby and starring Marika Rökk, Paul Hubschmid and Wilfried Seyferth. It was made at the Bavaria Studios in Munich and on location in Rome. The film's sets were designed by the art director Erich Kettelhut. It was shot in Agfacolor. It is an operetta film based on the stage work of the same name composed by Fred Raymond. A previous film version was made in 1943.

== Cast ==
- Marika Rökk as Juliska Varady
- Paul Hubschmid as Armando Cellini
- Wilfried Seyferth as Orgando, Manager
- Walter Müller as Seppl Frauenhofer
- Ernst Waldow as Police Inspector Lamento
- Annie Rosar as Birri, Wardrobe Mistress
- Fritz Odemar as Theatre Director Corelli
- Helli Servi as Putti Pierotti
- Rudolf Schündler as Stage Manager
- Peter W. Staub as Wat Nu, Chinese Servant
- Ulrich Bettac
- Kurt Reimann as Singer
