= Night in Paradise =

Night in Paradise may refer to:

- A Night in Paradise (1919 film), a 1919 German film
- A Night in Paradise (1932 film), a 1932 German film
- Night in Paradise (1946 film), a 1946 American film
- Night in Paradise (2020 film), a 2020 South Korean film
