= Junger Herr auf altem Hof =

1969 German television series

- Directed by: Hermann Kugelstadt
- Starring: Heinz Engelmann
- Country of origin: Germany

Junger Herr auf altem Hof is a German television series that premiered on December 15, 1969.

== Plot ==
The Grothe farm has been passed down from generation to generation as a proud family property. However, father Christian Grothe is getting too old to manage the farm alone. Son Helmut, who had plans to move to Canada with his bride Ursula Bentheim, is not very enthusiastic about taking over the farm, but decides to do it. The decision hits Ursula especially hard, who now has to put her own career plans on hold.

== See also ==
- List of German television series
