= The Blue Mask (disambiguation) =

The Blue Mask is a 1982 album by singer-songwriter Lou Reed.

The Blue Mask may also refer to:

- "The Blue Mask", a 2003 short story by Joel Lane

== See also ==
- "The Girl in the Blue Mask", episode of Criminal Minds: Suspect Behavior
