= Mask in Blue (1943 film) =

1943 film

- German film poster
- German: Maske in Blau
- Directed by: Paul Martin
- Written by: Heinz Hentschke (operetta); Rolf E. Vanloo; Walter Forster; Jo Hanns Rösler
- Produced by: Hans Lehmann
- Starring: Clara Tabody; Wolf Albach-Retty; Hans Moser
- Cinematography: István Eiben
- Edited by: Gertrud Hinz-Nischwitz
- Music by: Fred Raymond (operetta); Michael Jary
- Production company: Neue Film
- Distributed by: Märkische-Panorama-Schneider
- Release date: 15 January 1943
- Running time: 90 minutes
- Country: Germany
- Language: German

Mask in Blue (German: Maske in Blau) is a 1943 German musical comedy film directed by Paul Martin and starring Clara Tabody, Wolf Albach-Retty and Hans Moser.

It is an operetta film based on the stage work of the same name composed by Fred Raymond. The film was remade in Agfacolor by Georg Jacoby in 1953.

The film's sets were designed by the art director Heinrich Beisenherz and Alfred Bütow.

== Cast ==
- Clara Tabody as Gitta Stadelmann
- Wolf Albach-Retty as Georg Harding
- Hans Moser as Seehauser, Room Service Manager
- Richard Romanowsky as Prof Sebastian Stadelmann
- Ernst Waldow as Franz Stanzinger
- Leo Peukert as Bommerlund, Theatre Director
- Roma Bahn as Ilona Körössy
- Josefine Dora as Hermine, Stadelmann's Housekeeper
- Gertrud Wolle
- Tibor Halmay as Ballet Master
- Béla Fáy
- Walter Lieck
- Livia Miklós
- Sándor Pethes
- Eugen Rex as hotel porter
