= Maske in Blau =

Maske in Blau (Mask in Blue) is a grand operetta in two parts (six scenes) with music by Fred Raymond to a libretto by Heinz Hentschke and Günther Schwenn. The work had its premiere under Werner Schmidt-Boelke on 27 September 1937 at the Metropol Theater in Berlin. It was revived on 20 March 1955 at the Théâtre Municipal, Strasbourg, under the title Le masque bleu.

It was made into a 1943 film directed by Paul Martin. A decade later Georg Jacoby remade the film as a vehicle for his wife Marika Rökk.

== Roles and premiere cast ==
- Evelyne Valera (soprano) – Carla Carlsen
- Juliska Varady (soprano) – Clara Tabody
- Seppl Fraunhofer (tenor)
- Armando Cellini (tenor)
- Franz Kilian (bass)

== Synopsis ==
=== Place and time ===
The first part of the operetta (scenes 1–3) takes place in Sanremo in Italy and the second part (scenes 4–6 ) on the Rio Negro in Argentina at the time of the premiere, that is, in the 1930s.

=== Part 1 ===
Armando Cellini is a celebrated artist. With his painting "Mask in Blue" he was able to win the first prize in a competition, creating a breakthrough in the art market. Exactly one year ago, the painting was created when he was a guest at a ball and portrayed an unknown beauty. Since then this woman has haunted his visions. Because she had promised him to come back in a year to the exact day, he hopes to see her today. He would recognize her even without her blue mask, that he had given her after the completion of the picture along with a ring and asked her to wear them on her return.

Evelyne Valera, a wealthy plantation owner from Argentina, arrives with her entourage at the Grand Hotel. Each visitor suspects that this "Mask in Blue" has to be her, and is thus correct. The lady intends to seek out the artist in his studio.

Armando Cellini is waiting longingly for the visit of the unknown beauty. When the doorbell rings, he thinks he is already on target, but gets the same bitter disappointment. A stranger enters his studio posing as Pedro dal Vegas. The only thing that interests him, is the painting "Mask in Blue". His request is that, the painter should it sell it to him, but the request remains unfulfilled.

Shortly after Pedro dal Vegas has left the atelier, a new guest is announced. This time it is the desired "Mask in Blue". The painter recognizes her immediately from her ring. Now things begin to spark between the two and they confess their love.

The next day a street festival is celebrated in Sanremo. This leads to the second meeting between Cellini and Pedro Armando dal Vegas. The painting would win by all means the favor of the wealthy plantation owner in order to rehabilitate his finances. Because he has noticed her love for the artist Cellini suggests he harbors a sinister plan: he has managed to steal the ring from Evelyn's purse. He gives it back to the painter, allegedly on behalf of the owner. Armando Cellini descends from jubilation to desperation. He had not imagined such a rapid change of his beloved.

In the hall of his palace the Marchese Cavallotti gives a reception in honor of his protégé Armando Cellini. Here are Gonzala, the major-domo of Evelyne Valera, and Franz Kilian, Armando best friend, in conversation. Gonzala would like to see if his employer would take the painter for a husband. He fears, however, that the deceitful Pedro dal Vegas could make his own advances. The two therefore decide to play fate. As the festival reaches its peak, they announce before all the guests the engagement of Evelyne Valera and Armando Cellini. The latter appears shocked; he feels the rich plantation owner used him a pawn. But there is no other way. Furious, she leaves the palace.

=== Part 2 ===
Evelyne now returns to their ranch on the Rio Grande and tries to forget Armando Cellini, but it does not succeed. Meanwhile, she maintains an active correspondence with majordomo Armando's friend Franz Kilian. The two do not give up to bring the couple still together. But Pedro dal Vegas obstinately continues in his attempts to conquer Evelyne. However, she is undecided whether to give in to his wooing.

Suddenly, a post rider approaches with a telegram to the landowner. The intriguing Vegas manages to catch the telegram and read it. It announces that Armando Cellini has landed with a few friends in the nearby provincial capital, and they will soon visit her on her property, for he had since learned how the ring got into the possession of dal Vegas. The Argentine immediately grabs the next best horse to ride in the provincial capital. He is unaware that one of the gauchos has noticed how he intercepted the telegram. As soon as the gaucho made the major domo aware of this development, he does not hesitate and rides after the crook.

After Armondo Cellini had sent the telegram in the provincial capital, he heard the rumor that Evelyne's engagement with Pedro dal Vegas was imminent. Without much thought he made immediately his way to the hacienda. Half way he meets the fraudulent Argentine. The painter harangues Vegas to abandon his marriage plans.

When the major domo with Armandos friends arrives a bit later at the ranch, all celebrate a joyous festival in which it comes naturally to the expected engagement.

== Musical highlights ==
- "Die Juliska, die Juliska aus Buda-, Budapest"
- "Schau einer schönen Frau nicht zu tief in die Augen"
- "Am Rio Negro, da steht ein kleines verträumtes Haus" (Duet)
- "Sassa, Sassa!"
- "Ja, das Temp'rament"
- "In dir hab ich mein Glück gefunden" (Duet)
- "Maske in Blau"

== Instrumentation ==
Two flutes, two oboes, two clarinets (or clarinet and saxophone), two bassoons, three horns, two trumpets, three trombones, a harp, a celesta, percussion and strings.

== Recordings ==
Excerpts with Marika Rökk, Rudolf Schock, Margit Schramm and the Berliner Symphoniker under the direction of Werner Schmidt-Boelcke on Eurodisc
