= Wedding Night in Paradise (1950 film) =

1950 film directed by Géza von Bolváry

- Directed by: Géza von Bolváry
- Written by: Heinz Hentschke (libretto); Ernst Marischka
- Produced by: Heinrich Jonen
- Starring: Johannes Heesters; Claude Farell; Gretl Schörg
- Cinematography: Herbert Körner
- Edited by: Rudolf Schaad
- Music by: Friedrich Schröder (operetta)
- Production company: Meteor-Film
- Distributed by: Herzog Filmverleih
- Release date: 24 October 1950
- Running time: 95 minutes
- Country: West Germany
- Language: German

Wedding Night in Paradise (German: Hochzeitsnacht im Paradies) is a 1950 West German musical comedy film directed by Géza von Bolváry and starring Johannes Heesters, Claude Farell, and Gretl Schörg. It was shot at the Wiesbaden Studios and on location in Venice. The film's sets were designed by the art director Paul Markwitz and Fritz Maurischat. It is an operetta film, based on the 1942 stage work of the same title.

== Synopsis ==
Operetta star Pieter van Goos decides to settle down and marry Clarisse Röders, the daughter of a wealthy shipowner. However, his hot-tempered stage partner and former lover Rosita Pareira is jealous. She follows them on their honeymoon to Italy, hoping to disrupt it and break up the couple.

== Cast ==
- Johannes Heesters as Pieter van Goos
- Claude Farell as Clarisse Röders
- Fritz Rémond as Felix Brökelmann
- Gretl Schörg as Rosita Pareira
- Fritz Odemar as Otto Röders
- Bum Krüger as Dr. Fritz Oberländer
- Oskar Sima as Gustav Bonobom
- Joseph Egger as Biangetti, Portier
- Clemens Wilmenrod as Kellner
- Albert Florath as Arzt
- Ferruccio Biancini as Italiener in Venedig
- Otto Stern as Oberkellner
- Willi Hoffmann as Liftboy
- Ilse Korte as Stewardess
- Carl Ehrhardt-Hardt
- Marieluise Riexinger

== Bibliography ==
- Bock, Hans-Michael; Bergfelder, Tim, eds. (2009). The Concise Cinegraph: Encyclopaedia of German Cinema. New York: Berghahn Books. ISBN 978-1-57181-655-9.
