= Wedding Night in Paradise (operetta) =

Wedding Night in Paradise (German: Hochzeitsnacht im Paradies) is an operetta in eight scenes. Book by Heinz Hentschke, lyrics by Gunther Schwenn and music by Friedrich Schröder. It was premièred in Berlin at the Metropol Theater on September 24, 1942. It was filmed several times in German and several other languages.

== Adaptations ==
- Wedding Night In Paradise, a 1950 West German film directed by Géza von Bolváry
- Wedding Night In Paradise, a 1962 Austrian film directed by Paul Martin

== Bibliography ==
- Daniel Meyer-Dinkgrafe. Boulevard Comedy Theatre in Germany. Cambridge Scholars Publishing, 2009.
