= Staircases in Mariahilf =

Mariahilf, the 6th district of Vienna, features together with Alsergrund, the 9th district of Vienna, the steepest topography of the inner districts. There is a 30-meter elevation from Wienfluss to Mariahilfer Straße. Several public staircases have been built:

- Amonstiege, connects Stiegengasse and Windmühlgasse.
- Capistranstiege, connects Capistrangasse and Fillgradergasse.
- Corneliusstiege, connects Corneliusgasse and Gumpendorferstrasse.
- Fillgraderstiege, connects Fillgradergasse and Theobaldgasse.
- Rahlstiege, connects Rahlgasse and Mariahilfer Straße.
- Viktor-Matejka-Stiege, connects Kaunitzgasse with Eggerthgasse and Luftbadgasse.

There is also a staircase in Raimundhof, a passageway connecting Windmühlgasse and Mariahilfer Straße.
