= Rudolfsheim-Fünfhaus =

Coordinates: 48°12′03″N 16°19′12″E

Rudolfsheim-Fünfhaus Rudoifsham Fümfhaus (Bavarian)
- 15th District of Vienna
- Coat of arms

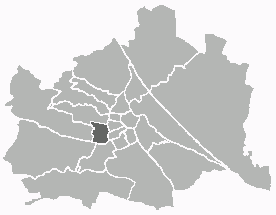
- Location of the district within Vienna
- Country: Austria
- City: Vienna

Government
  - District Director: Dietmar Baurecht (SPÖ)
  - First Deputy: Claudia Bettina Dobias (SPÖ)
  - Second Deputy: Karl Schwing (FPÖ)
  - Representation (46 Members): SPÖ 19, Greens 15, FPÖ 8, KPÖ 4, ÖVP 3, NEOS 3

Area
  - Total: 3.92 km^{2} (1.51 sq mi)

Population (2016-01-01)
  - Total: 78,388
  - Density: 20,000/km^{2} (51,800/sq mi)
- Postal code: A-1150
- Address of District Office: Gasgasse 8-10; A-1150 Wien
- Website: www.wien.gv.at/bezirke/rudolfsheim-fuenfhaus/

Rudolfsheim-Fünfhaus (German: [ˈʁuːdɔlfsˌhaɪm fʏnfˈhaʊs]; Viennese: Rudoifsham Fümfhaus) is the 15th municipal District of Vienna, Austria (German: 15. Bezirk). It is in central Vienna, west of Innere Stadt.

It borders Neubau and Mariahilf in the east, Meidling and Hietzing in the south, Penzing in the west, and Ottakring in the north. The northern border runs along the Gablenzgasse and eastern border along the Gürtel beltway (Neubaugürtel, Mariahilfer Gürtel and Sechshauser Gürtel). It includes the areas of Rudolfsheim (divided into Braunhirschen, Reindorf and Rustendorf), Fünfhaus and Sechshaus.

== Geography ==
=== Topography ===
The district area of Rudolfsheim-Fünfhaus was, during the Mesozoic Era, near a sea that retreated 70 million years ago and gradually formed an inland sea. After the final retreat of the sea occurred during the Ice Age, large masses of debris formed from glaciers, mainly from the Danube, but also the Vienna River in the Vienna Basin. In the warm phase, the Danube and Vienna River cut into the land and formed gravel terraces, with the older terraces being at increasing distance from the waters. Rudolfsheim-Fünfhaus is located in the oldest terrace (Laaerbergterrasse) supported by Laaerberg on Gloriette from the melting of the Turks and hill ranges. In this section, the terrace Wiental lies, which was once covered by the melting to Gloriette. Through the ever-receding water levels, the height sections remained for the current district area.

The top soil layer in the district territory consists of a thin layer of loess, which is mixed with limestone and sandstone gravel from the Vienna Woods. Among them are layers of river gravel, mainly quartz, coming from the Alps. Below this gravel are the relics of the freshwater sea that a layer of sand, gravel and Tegel deposited. The district area rises from south to north and from east to west. The lowest area of the district territory is located at the intersection of Sechshauser Belt and Ullmannstraße with an elevation of 184 metres (604 ft). The highest point is at the crossing Johnstraße and Hütteldorferstraße with an elevation of 240.6 metres (789 ft).

=== Waters ===
The Vienna River was, in prehistoric times, several hundred meters (a half-mile) wide, and in the Roman period, it was still a wide river with many islands. Even in the Middle Ages and in modern times, the Vienna River has played a dominant role for centuries. On the one hand, the river and its floods repeatedly caused heavy destruction. On the other hand, the river served many people as a source of income, both by fishing, as well as the use of water for industry or the operation of the many watermills. The largest river branch, Mühlbach, followed along Ullmannstraße and Mollardgasse streets. Even smaller streams, which emptied into the Vienna River, were originally in the district area. Today canalised Hollerbach has established itself as a corridor, receiving the name "Hollergasse" lane.

=== District parts ===
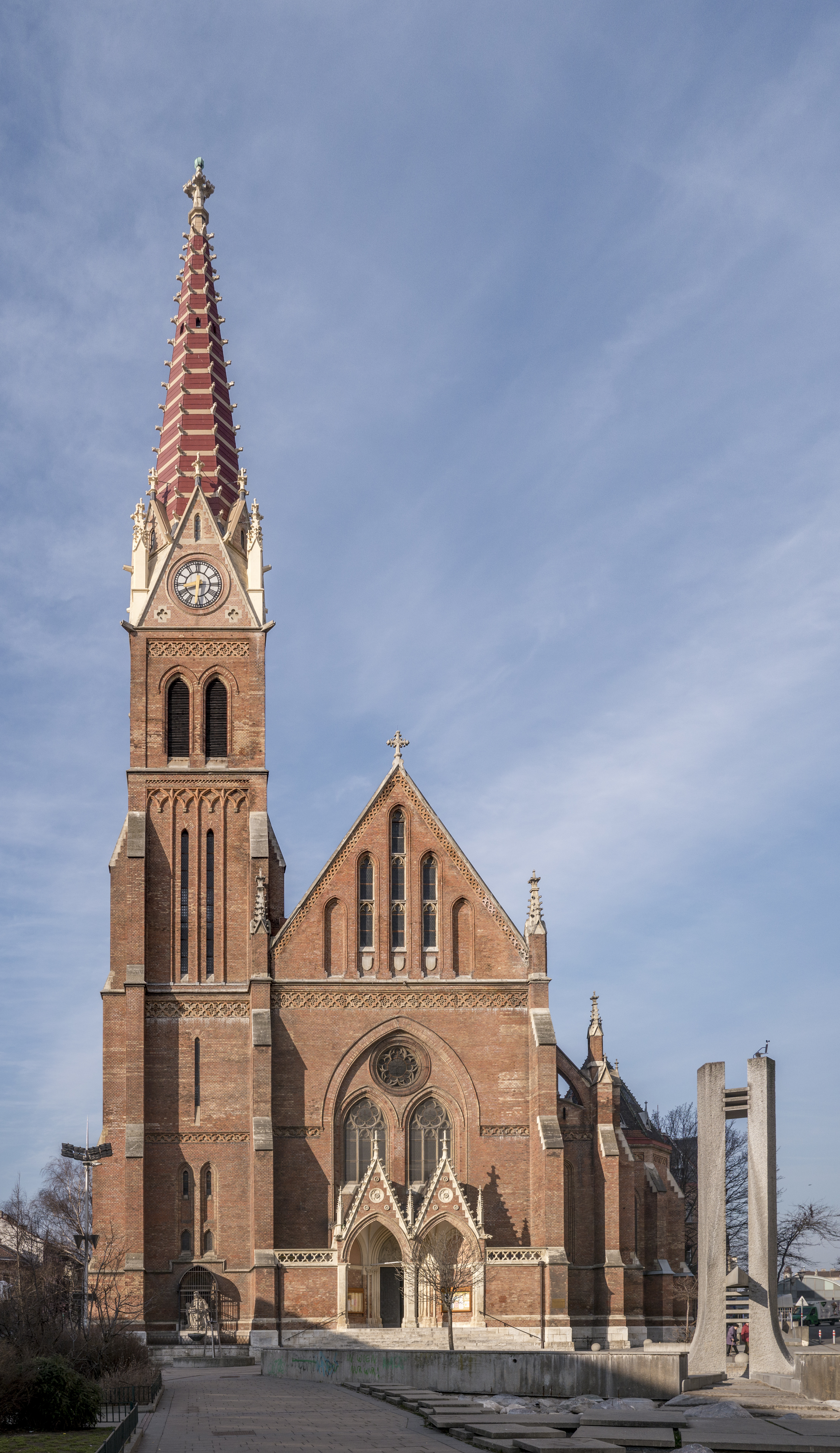
Rudolfsheimer Kirche church

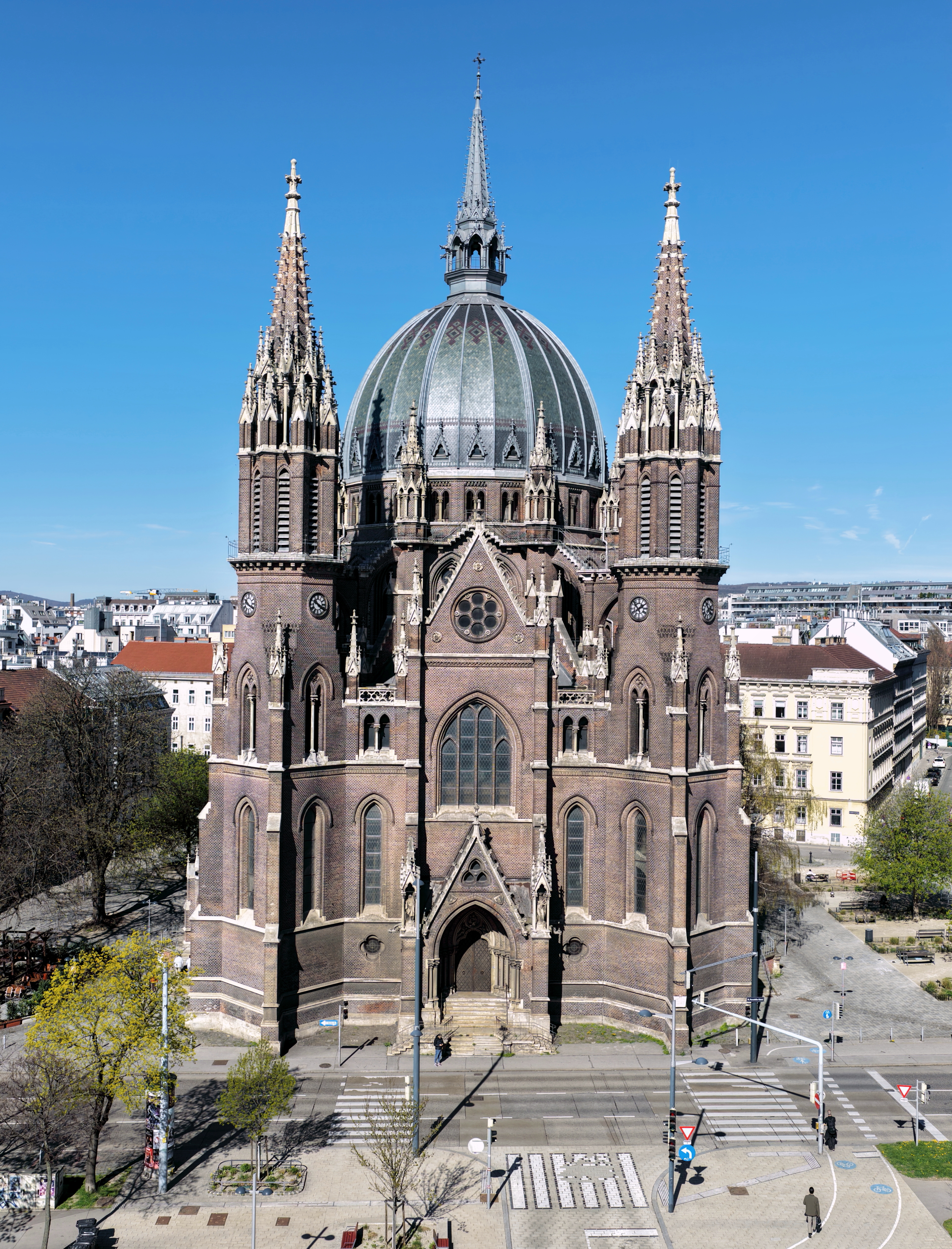
Kirche Maria vom Siege church

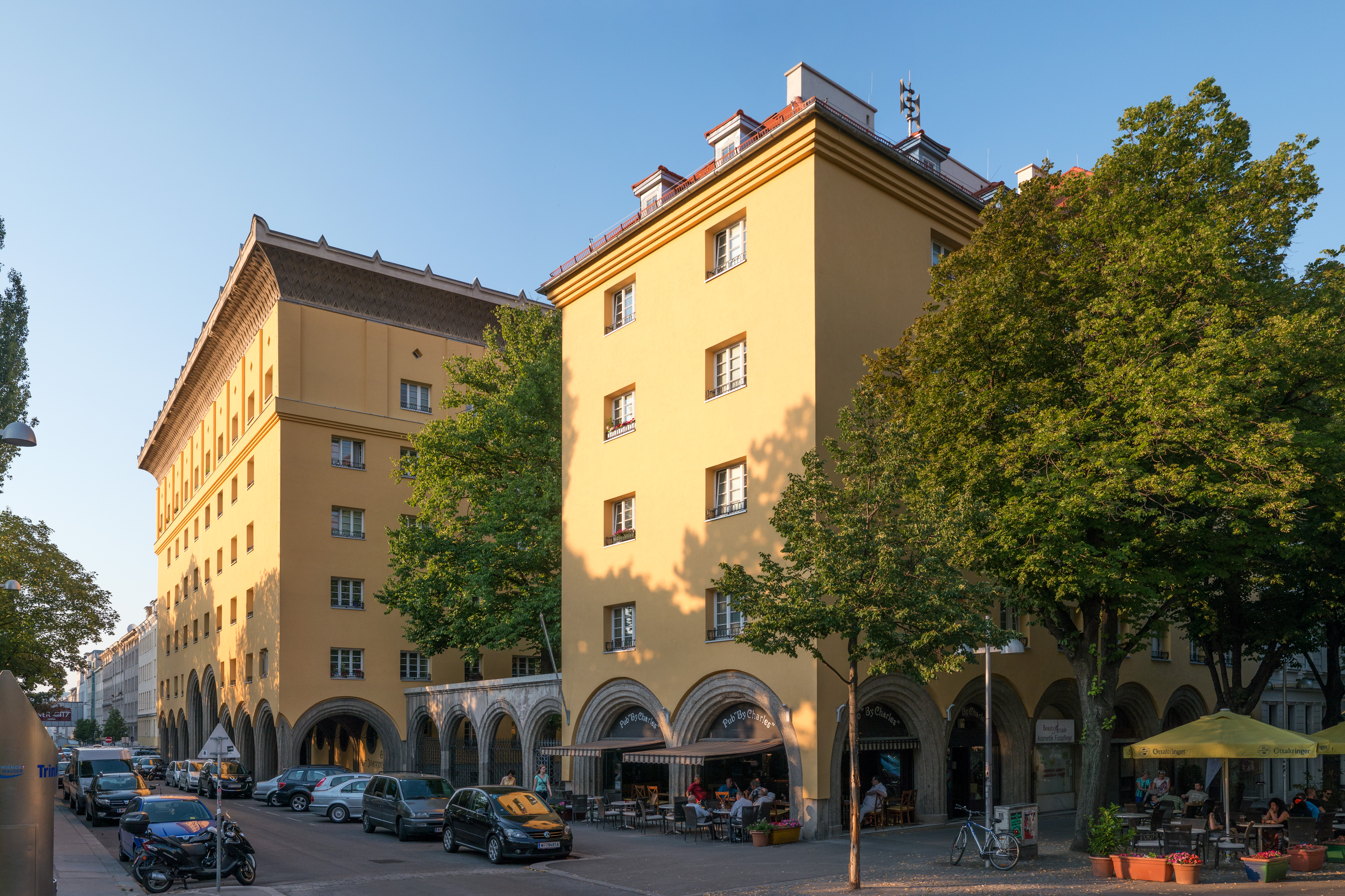
Vogelweidhof

Rudolfsheim-Fünfhaus was formed mainly from the communities of Rudolfsheim, Fünfhaus and Sechshaus, which currently are the 3 Katastralgemeinden sections of the district.

Over time, the district was extended in addition to parts of Gaudenzdorf (between Wienzeile and Diefenbachgasse) and Penzing (between Hollergasse and Winckelmann Street). Sechshaus is located in the southeast between Hollergasse, Sechshauser Straße and Diefenbachgasse. Rudolfsheim is located in the southwest area of the district, Fünfhaus east of it, the origin was in the area Clementinengasse on a path between Gumpendorf and Schmelz. The border between Rudolfsheim and Fünfhaus run along the line Pouthongasse - Schmelzbrücken Ramp - Grenzgasse - Geibelgasse. Originally, Fünfhaus included the area between Mariahilfer Straße, Kenyongasse, and Wimbergergasse Burggasse, but it was released in 1907 on new construction.

The former municipalities of Rudolfsheim and Fünfhaus are also divided into different district parts. Rudolfsheim was formed from the municipalities Rustendorf, Braunhirschen and Reindorf, whose centers were south of Mariahilferstraße. The northern part of Fünfhaus, north from Hütteldorferstraße, divided in turn into Schmelz with the University Sports Institute and the Kleingarten area, the adjacent east Nibelungen quarter and the area of Neu-Fünfhaus, which encloses the two regions.

A breakdown of the district area is also in the census-district official statistics, in which the municipality counts are combined. The seven census-districts in Rudolfsheim-Fünfhaus are: Stadthalle, Reithofferplatz, Fünfhaus-Westbahnhof, Sechshaus, Rudolfsheim-Braunhirschen, Rauscherplatz and Schmelz.

=== Land use ===
The developed area of Rudolfsheim-Fünfhaus comprises 52.8% (Vienna citywide 33.3%) of the District area. Nearly 81.0% of the developed area is accounted for by residences, bringing the district in the upper part of the Vienna districts. Farmland includes a share of 8.2% of the area. Cultural, religious, sporting or public buildings share 10.6% of the area. Nearly 33.5% of the district is in traffic/transportation areas. This is the third highest value of a municipality of Vienna.

By contrast, the proportion of grassland in the district is rather small: 12.7%. About half of the green areas are parks, 31.2% attributable to small gardens, with 18.5% as outdoor sports and recreation areas. A final 1.0% is water, i.e. the river bed of the Vienna River.

Space allocation in 2003
Builtspace			Greenspace						Water	Transport areas
204.04			49.16						3.68	129.46
Residences	Oper- ations	Public Facilities	Farms	Parks	Forests	Meadows	Small gardens	Rec. areas		
165.35	16.62	21.59	31.7	24.5	0	15.34	0.21	9.11		

== History ==
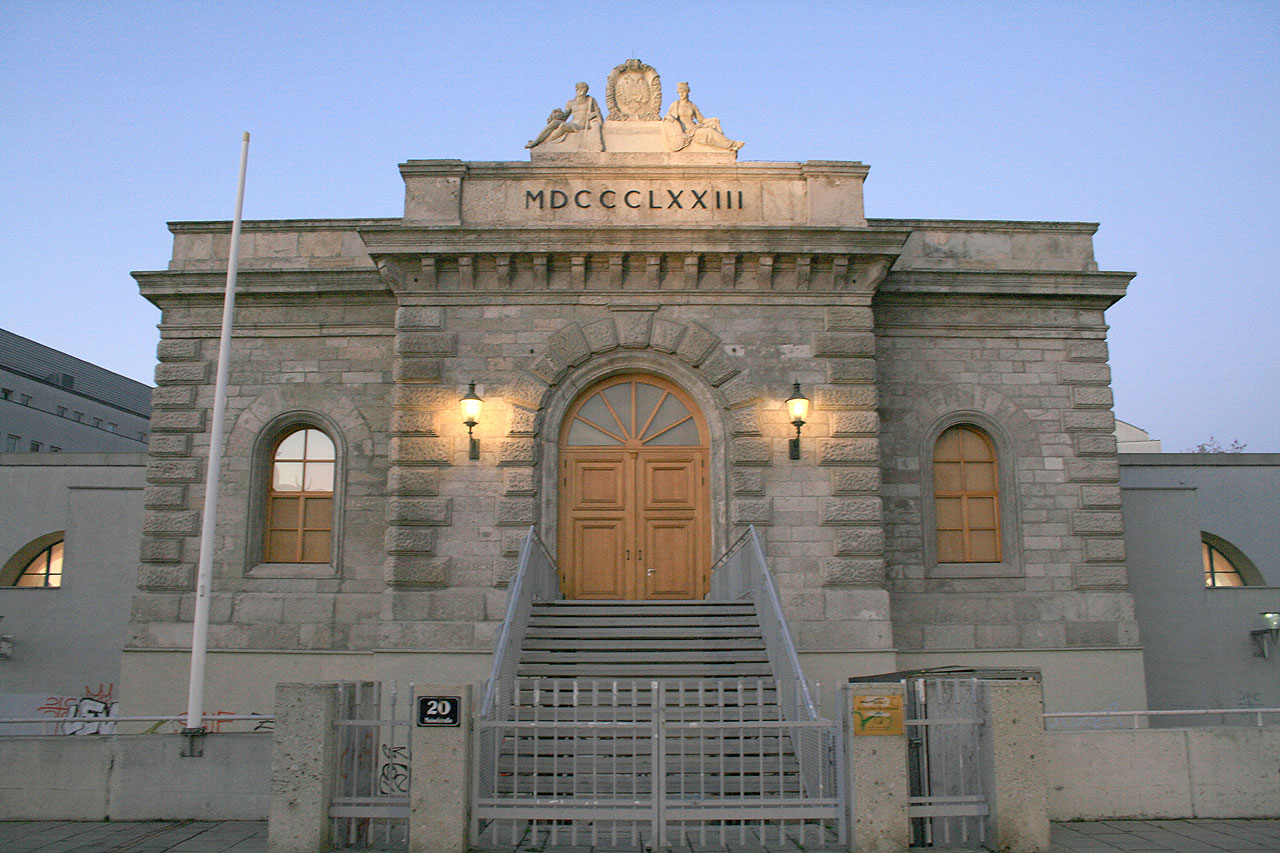
The old Schieberkammer (built 1873) of the water-reservoir at Schmelz

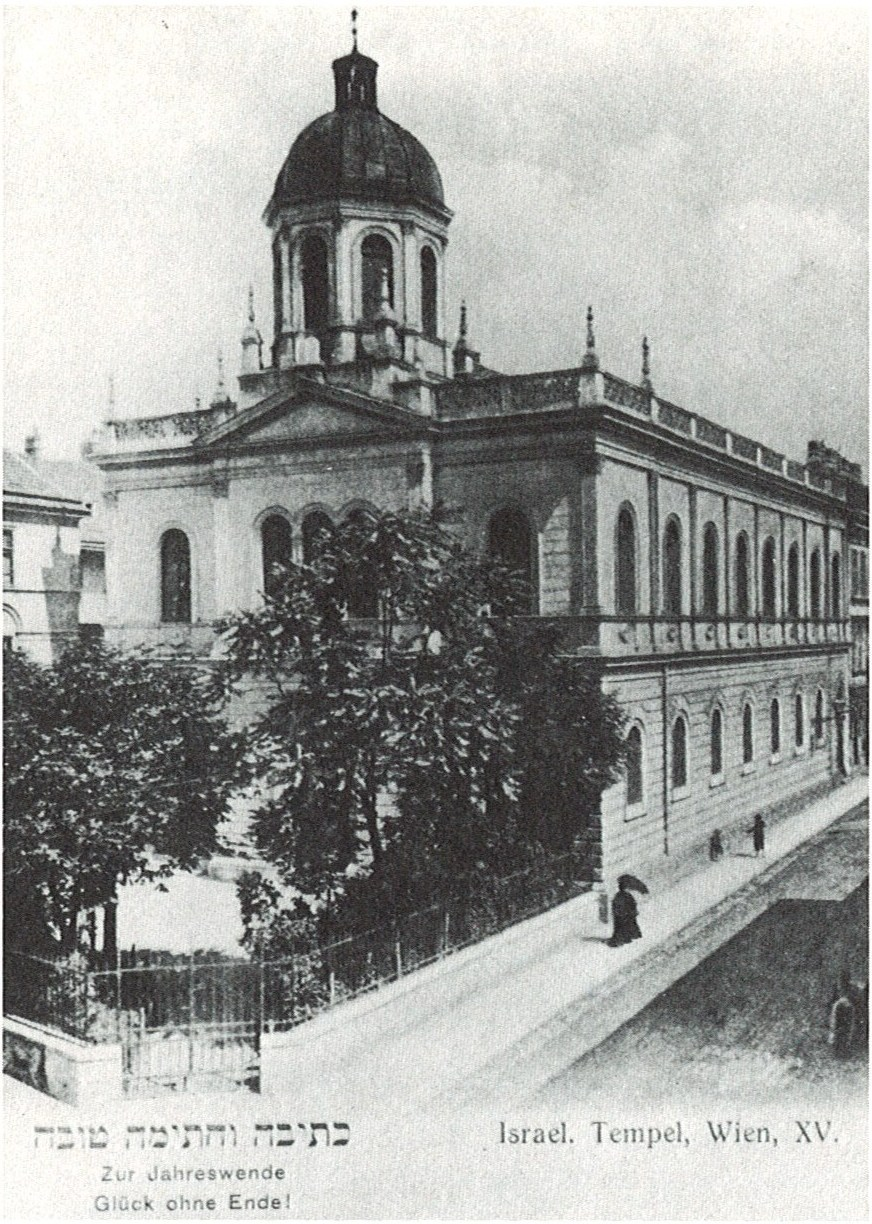
The synagogue on Turnergasse street (c. 1900)

After the second Turkish siege of Vienna, the villages of Reindorf, Braunhirschen, and Rustendorf arose and were in 1863 combined into the municipality of Rudolfsheim, named after the Crown Prince Rudolf of Austria. In the nineteenth century, the district grew significantly, and in 1890 was incorporated along with nearby communities Fünfhaus and Sechshaus into Vienna proper. The northern and eastern parts of Fünfhaus became the fifteenth district and the area of Rudolfsheim and Sechshaus became the fourteenth district under the name of Rudolfsheim alone. In 1938 Rudolfsheim and Fünfhaus were unified into the 15th district, and the 14th district became the part of the 13th district north of the Wien River. Since 1957, the 15th district has been named Rudolfsheim-Fünfhaus.

From 1871 to 1938, there had been the synagogue on Turner Street, but during the November Pogrom Kristallnacht, it was destroyed, along with 91 other Viennese synagogues. Only the City Temple in the 1st District survived the night unscathed.

In the 1990s, there were several small changes in district boundaries. In 1992, the boundaries were altered in the area of the Auer-Welsbach Park. In 1995, the district boundaries changed in two sections of the belt, and in the field Kendlerstraße, Sporckplatz and Ibsenstraße. The most recent change was marginal in 1996 in the area of Europe square in front of the Western Railway Station. These border changes were not in residential areas, but especially at transport buildings, parks and sports facilities.

== Population ==
Population Growth

Data from Statistik Austria

=== Population development ===
In 1869, the current area covered by the Rudolfsheim-Fünfhaus district already included 64,042 inhabitants, and it was similarly densely populated as it is today. Through the continuous influx of people into the area, the population increased until the beginning of World War I, and had doubled by 1910 at the peak of 145,694 people. Afterwards, a permanent population decline occurred, which was mainly due to higher housing claims. After a historic low of 64,895 inhabitants in 2001, the district population trended to re-grow. Only after the turn of the millennium, did the population in Vienna citywide tend to grow. At the beginning of 2007, the population stood at 70,490 people in Rudolfsheim-Fünfhaus.

=== Population structure ===
The age structure of the district population in 2001 was slightly younger than the average across Vienna. The number of children under 15 years was 15.3%, slightly higher than for Vienna citywide (14.7%). The proportion of the population from 15 to 59 years stood at 65.8% (Vienna: 63.6%), with the proportion of people over the age of 60 as 19.0% (Vienna: 21.7%), significantly lower than the city as a whole. The gender distribution in the district area was 48.2% men and 51.8% women. The percentage of married people was 40.6%, compared to 41.2% citywide, slightly below the average of Vienna.

=== Origin and language ===
The proportion of foreign-born district residents in 2006 was 31.8% (Vienna: 19.1%) the highest percentage of all districts of Vienna. As in the rest of the municipality, the share is growing, in 2001 it stood at 29.2%. The highest proportion of foreigners in 2005 representing approximately a 9.6% share of the district population were nationals from Serbia and Montenegro. Another 4.7% were Turkish, 2.5% Nigerian, 2.3% Croatian, 2.2% Bosnian and 1.1% Algerian citizens. In 2001, nearly 35.2% of the district population was born in Austria. Almost 13.0% stated Serbian as their mother tongue, 8.7% Turkish and 5.4% Croatian.

=== Religious preferences ===
Due to the high proportion of foreigners, Rudolfsheim- has the lowest percentage (40.2%) of Roman Catholics of all districts of Vienna (Vienna average: 49.2%). There are seven district Roman Catholic parishes, forming the City Deanery 15. The proportion of people belonging to the Muslim and Orthodox faiths was 14.7% and 11.4%, the highest levels in Vienna. The proportion of Protestant residents stood at 3.1%, below the average. Almost 23.3% of the district population in 2001 did not belong to a religious community. Another 7.4% stated they were either not religious at all or had some other religious preference.

== Politics ==
District Directors from 1945
Johann Klugmayer (KPÖ)	1945–1946
Heinrich Hajek (SPÖ)	1946–1963
Maximilian Eder (SPÖ)	1968–1985
Kurt Menger (SPÖ)	1985–1990
Friedrich Krammer (SPÖ)	1990–1996
Rolf Huber (SPÖ)	1996–2003
Walter Braun (SPÖ)	2003–2008
Gerhard Zatlokal (SPÖ)	2008–

The SPÖ in Rudolfsheim-Fünfhaus always enjoyed a strong majority and appointed the district governor throughout the post WW 2 era. The Social Democrats governed the district for a long time, with either an absolute majority of the vote or of district mandataries. In the 1991 election, an ascendant FPÖ was for the first time able to overtake the ÖVP, which had traditionally always been the second largest party in the district with the highest proportion of foreign-born residents. In 1996, the FPÖ scored its best result in any district of Vienna and broke the lock of the SPÖ on an absolute majority mandate. In the 2001 election, however, the FPÖ lost heavily, falling even below its result of 1991. The SPÖ and the Greens benefited from its losses. The SPÖ garnered around 47% of the vote (see chart below), a result close to an absolute majority. The Greens received 14% of the vote, becoming the third-strongest force in the district, and managed to overtake the ÖVP (as 4th). This trend persisted into 2005. The SPÖ won easily that year getting 49% of the vote; the Greens overtook the FPÖ with about 18% of the vote and became the second-largest party, which traditionally provides the deputy governor of the district. The ÖVP was only the 4th largest party in 2005, as its share of the vote continued to stagnate.

District representation 1991-2005
Jahr	SPÖ	ÖVP	FPÖ	Grüne	LIF	Sonstige
1991	49.9	15.5	23.9	8.2	n.k	2.5
1996	38.1	12.6	32.3	9.1	5.6	2.3
2001	47.3	12.9	22.0	14.4	2.6	0.9
2005	49.5	13.5	16.1	17.6	0.5	2.8

== Coat of arms ==

The coat of arms of Rudolfsheim-Fünfhaus consists of the emblems of four once independent municipalities. The top half shows the emblem of the municipality of Rudolfsheim until 1853, which was formed by a merger of the previously independent communities of Rustendorf, Reindorf and Braunhirschen. The blue part of the coat of arms represents Rustendorf with a silver crescent as its symbol. The green section to the right of it represents Reinsdorf. The golden grapevine with two leaves on a green background symbolizes the wine that was once produced there. The middle section of the coat of arms represents the village of Braunhirschen: the brown deer with its mighty antlers once decorated the entrance of an inn which the former village was named after.

The red section at the bottom represents the former villages of Fünfhaus and Sechshaus. It shows the Archangel Michael in a silver and golden robe, with ostrich feathers mounted to his helmet. Michael holds a golden lance festooned with a cross, which he uses to kill a green fire-breathing dragon. The image is the symbol of the Barnabitenkollegium St. Michael in Vienna, a monastery that was home to the founding fathers of the settlements of Fünfhaus and Sechshaus. As the former crest of Sechshaus was virtually identical to that of Fünfhaus, it is represented by the Fünfhaus section of the coat-of-arms.
