= Haus des Meeres =

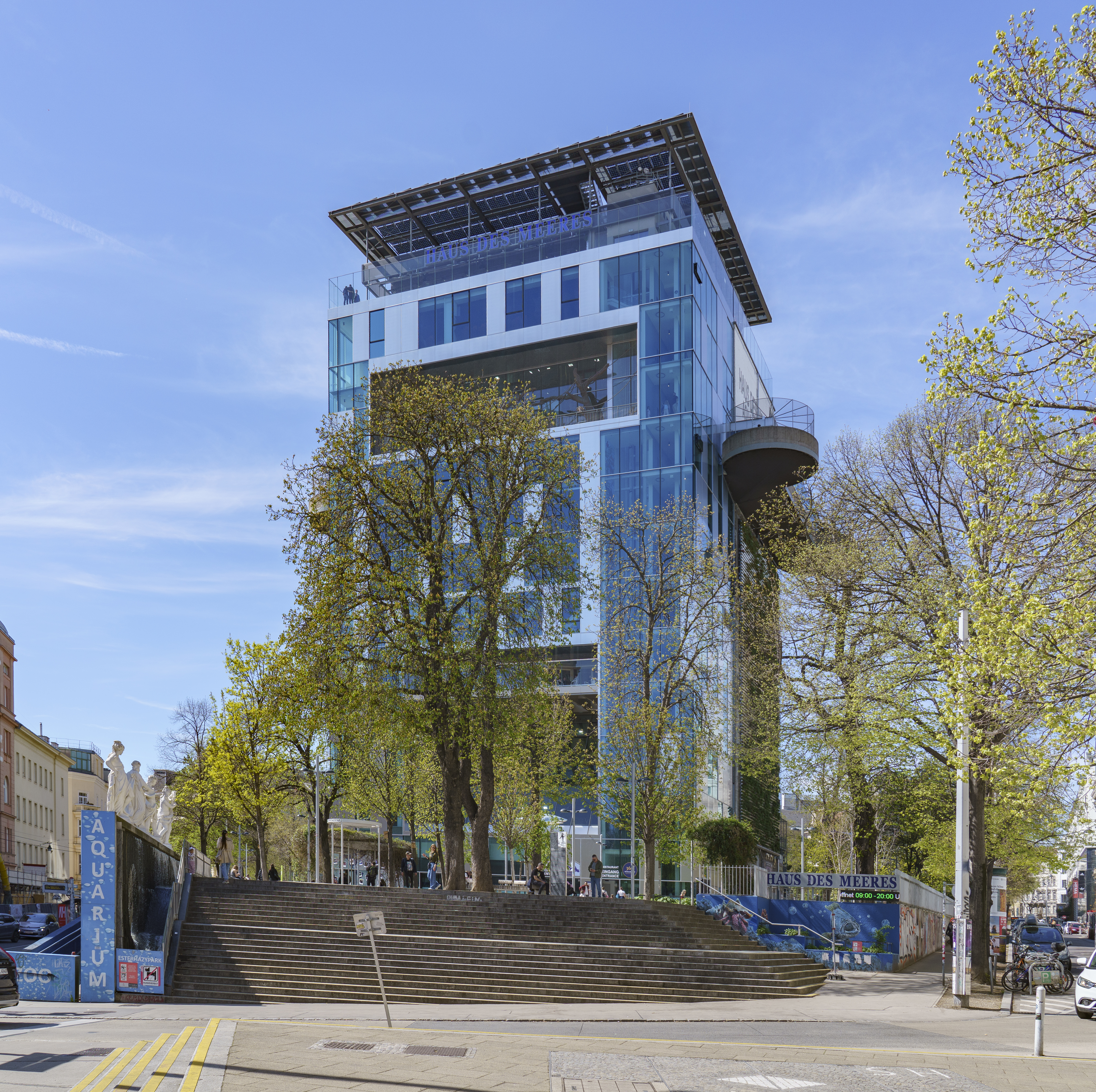
- The Haus des Meeres in 2026.
- Interactive map of Haus des Meeres
- 48°11′51″N 16°21′11″E
- Date opened: 1957
- Location: Vienna, Austria
- Floor space: 4,000 m^{2} (43,000 sq ft)
- No. of animals: 10,000+
- Annual visitors: 436,500 (2012)
- Website: www.haus-des-meeres.at

The Haus des Meeres (HdM, English: House of the Sea) is a public aquarium in Vienna, Austria. It is located in Esterhazy Park in the centre of Mariahilf district, one block south of the busy Mariahilfer Straße. The Haus des Meeres houses over ten thousand aquatic beings on an area of around 4,000 square meters (43,000 sq ft) inside a tall concrete flak tower built during World War II. In 2012 the Haus des Meeres attracted a record high of 650,000 visitors. The Haus des Meeres is managed by Aqua Terra Zoo, a private non-profit organization which, according to its web site, receives only marginal financial support from municipal authorities. (Note: 85 thousand euros in 2009, or 2.5% of the annual budget. - Vereinsvorstand (in German) . Haus des Meeres. Retrieved 2010-08-28.) However, the maintenance costs for the former flak tower are paid by the taxpayer.

== Background ==
The first public seawater aquarium in Vienna was opened in 1860 by Gustav Jäger. Jäger's aquarium, like its contemporaries, relied on regular delivery of natural seawater. It became a reality in 1854 with the construction of the Semmering railway linking Vienna with the Mediterranean coast. After two years of experimenting with small seawater tanks Jäger built a large aquarium for public display. He described the feelings of contemporary people who faced the unknown submarine world: "The first-time visitor ... cannot contain his inner excitement. His curiosity is so great that he can hardly enjoy the moment: I am sorry, but he looks so helpless, as if he has suddenly found himself among people whose language he neither speaks nor understands." Visitors sought new experience, but resisted believing what they saw behind the glass. The aquarium was a financial loss, and Jäger had to close it after four years of operation.

The concrete tower housing the present-day aquarium was erected as a fire control flak tower in ten months between October 1943 and July 1944. The tower is 47 meters (154 ft) tall, with a footprint of 31 by 15 meters (102 by 49 ft), and its gross volume, including extensive foundations, reaches 55,000 cubic meters (1,900,000 cu ft). In 1944 it was crowned with a Würzburg radar dome. In case of imminent air raid threat, the radar could be lowered into a concrete shaft with 3.5-meter (11 ft) thick concrete walls. The subordinate gun battery tower is located inside a city block north of Mariahilfer Straße. The two towers operated as a single combat unit, in cooperation with two other pairs of flak towers built in Augarten (north) and in Arenberg Park (south-east). (Note: Owing to prohibitively high costs of demolition, all six Viennese flak towers stand to date. As of 2009, demolition cost estimates start at 100 million Euro for each tower. - NS-Gedenkstätte im Flakturm (in German). Die Presse. April 5, 2009 (printed edition: April 7). Retrieved 2010-08-28.) After the war the tower in Esterhazy Park was temporarily used as a hotel with 38 rooms in a bunker, and then converted to a fire station.

From 1991 until 2019, the top of the building featured a public art installation by Lawrence Weiner, consisting of the words 'Smashed to Pieces (In the Still of the Night)' wrapped in large letters around the building. The artwork was removed and destroyed during renovations.

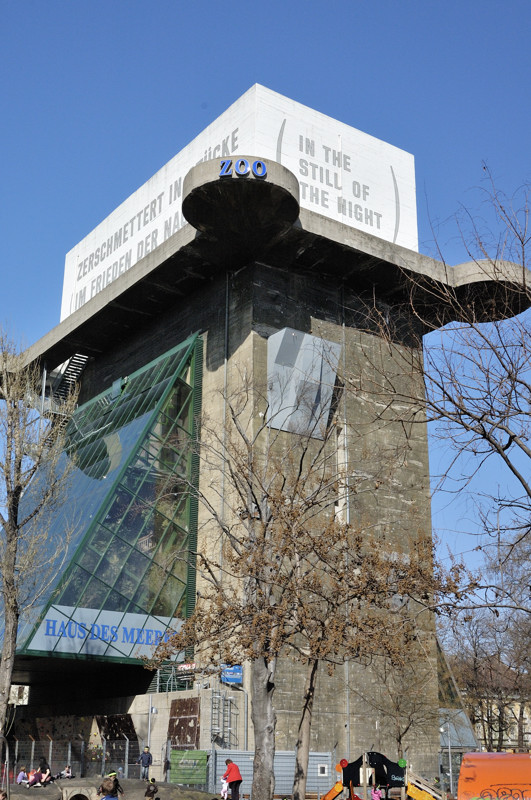
Haus des Meeres before the renovations in 2019. The top floor displaying the art piece by Lawrence Weiner.

== History ==
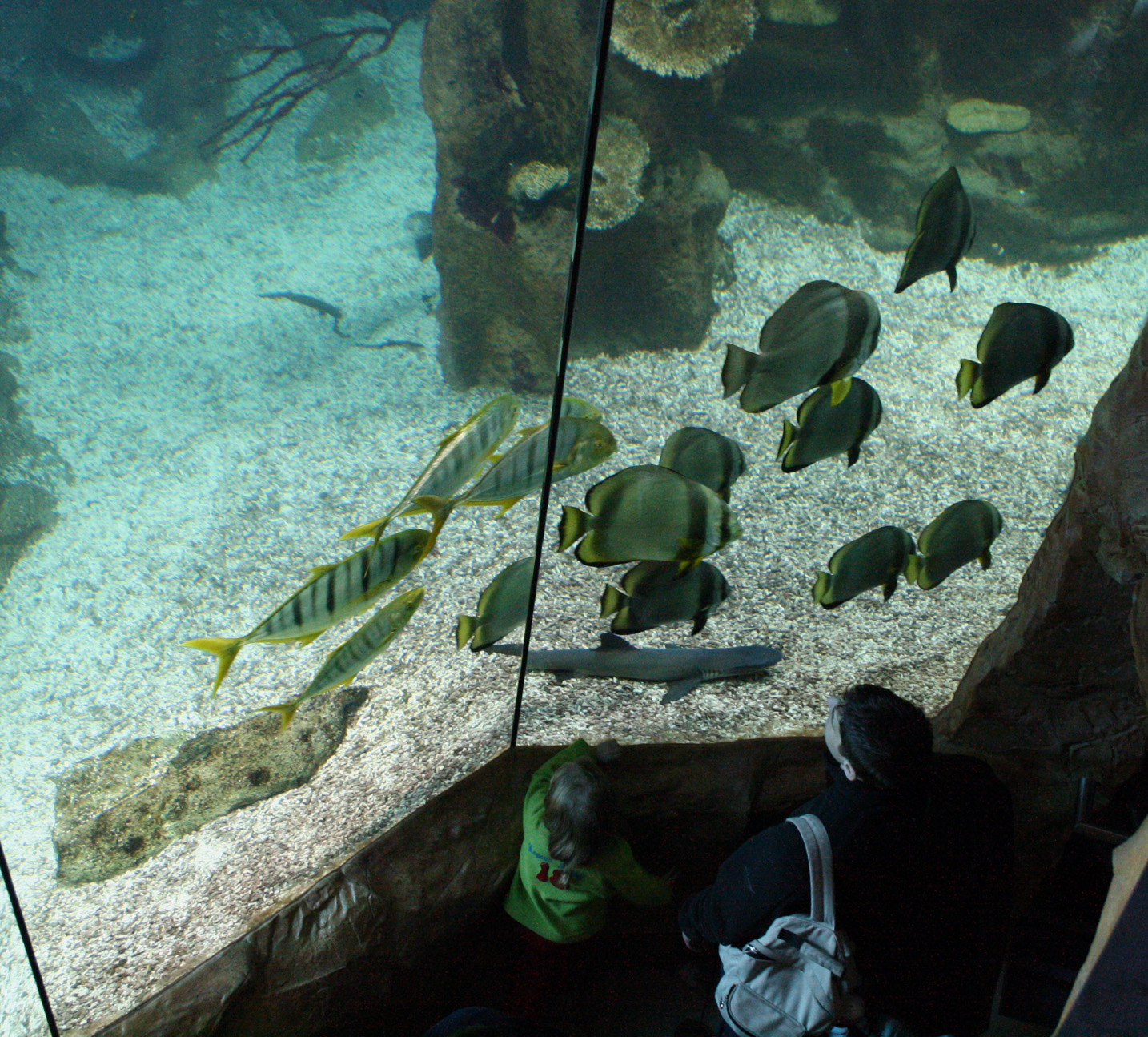
The gravel which lines the bottom of new fish tanks was recycled from concrete rubble.

In the 1960s the underground part of the bunker was used as a youth hostel, named Stadtherberge Esterhazypark.

Volunteers moved into the flak tower in November 1957. The ground floor and the bunkers were then occupied by the firefighters, which left only one and half habitable floors for the exhibition. The rest of the tower was filled with debris and open to the elements. Step by step, the aquarium expanded over the empty floors. Eventually, when the aquarium expanded to six floors, the firefighters left the buildings, and the aquarium staff was at last allowed to clear the basement of war relics.

In 1991 the building was crowned with a lightweight wraparound box with the slogan Smashed to Pieces .. In the Still of the Night (in English and German), a memorial against war and fascism designed by Lawrence Weiner. Eventually it became an obstacle to the expansion plans. The city authorities divided whether Weiner's work was a disposable billboard or a piece of artistic heritage, but by 2005 the latter viewpoint prevailed and the city picked up its maintenance costs. The old elevator, installed in 1944, operated without failure until 1997. It was replaced during an extensive renovation that enabled opening of three new floors (7, 8 and 9). The glass wings which house the reptiles and tropical birds, were added in 2000 and 2007. As of 2010, the tower houses ten habitable above-ground floors plus an open sightseeing roof deck. The tenth floor, which recreates a flak turm control vault, houses World War Two exhibits and is open only on weekends, with advance registration of visitors. The expansion had a side effect: the City of Vienna struck the "defaced" tower off the list of protected landmarks but enforced preservation of Weiner's billboard.

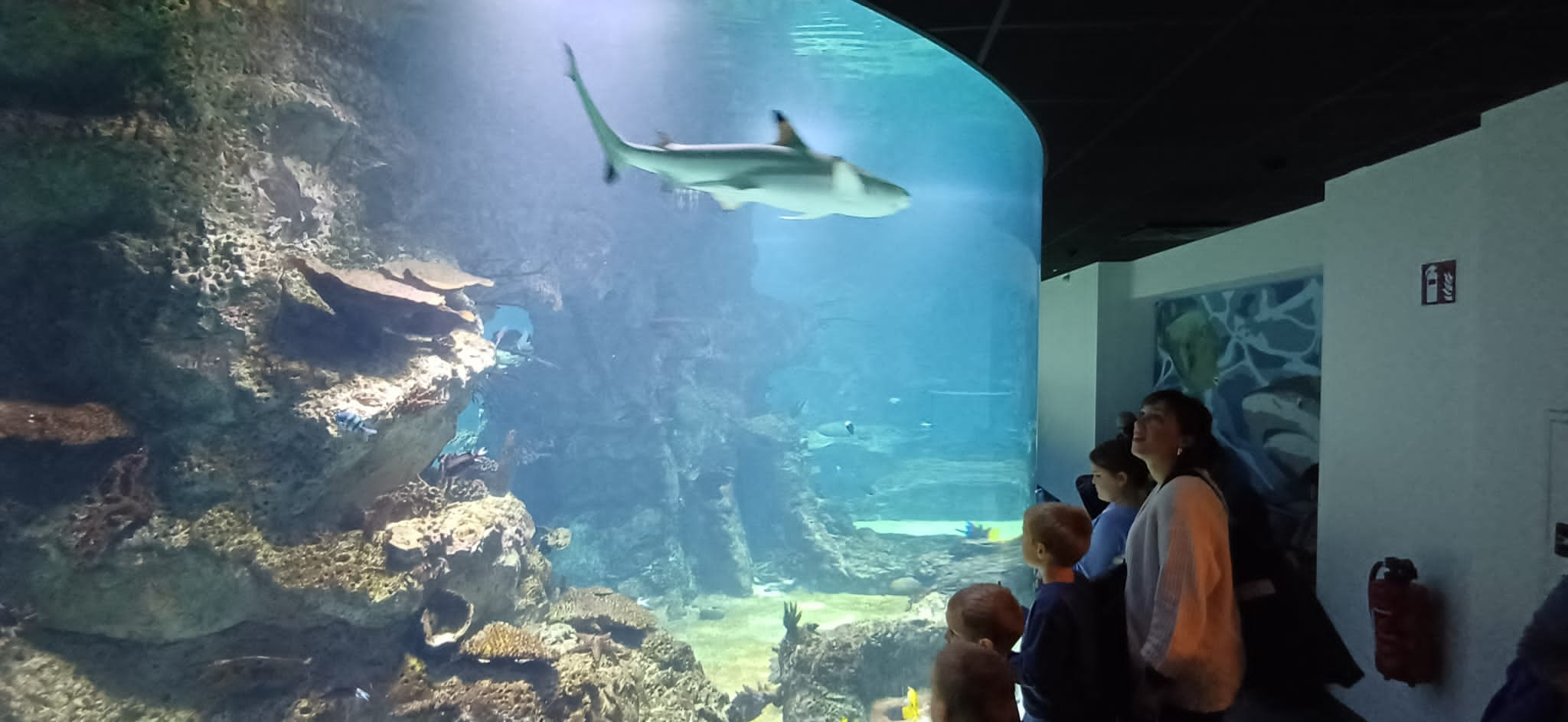
Fish tank in Haus des Meeres in Vienna, Austria

In 2007 the Haus des Meeres installed its largest, 300,000 L (79,000 US gal) tank for sharks. On 7 May the aquarium moved six adult blacktip reef sharks, properly sedated, to the new tank. All sharks quietly died in a few hours after awakening. Autopsy revealed fatal internal bleeding which was blamed on stress (after the accident other zoos confirmed that blacktip sharks are, indeed, prone to stress injury). The four replacement sharks of the same species that were delivered next month survived without lasting effects. The gravel lining the bottom of the tank was recycled from World War Two concrete which was torn down during the expansion. It is visible on the 55 euro cent commemorative stamp 50 Jahre "Haus des Meeres" issued by the Austrian Post in 2007.

The 2008 financial crisis caused an abrupt drop in visitor numbers of Viennese art museums. The Haus des Meeres, on the contrary, steadily attracted more visitors every year: 258 thousand in 2007, 336 thousand in 2008, 353 thousand in 2009. In 2009 it rose to number ten in the list of Vienna's tourist attractions ranked by ticket sales, despite a significant increase in ticket price.
