= Katharina Nahlik =

Austrian model

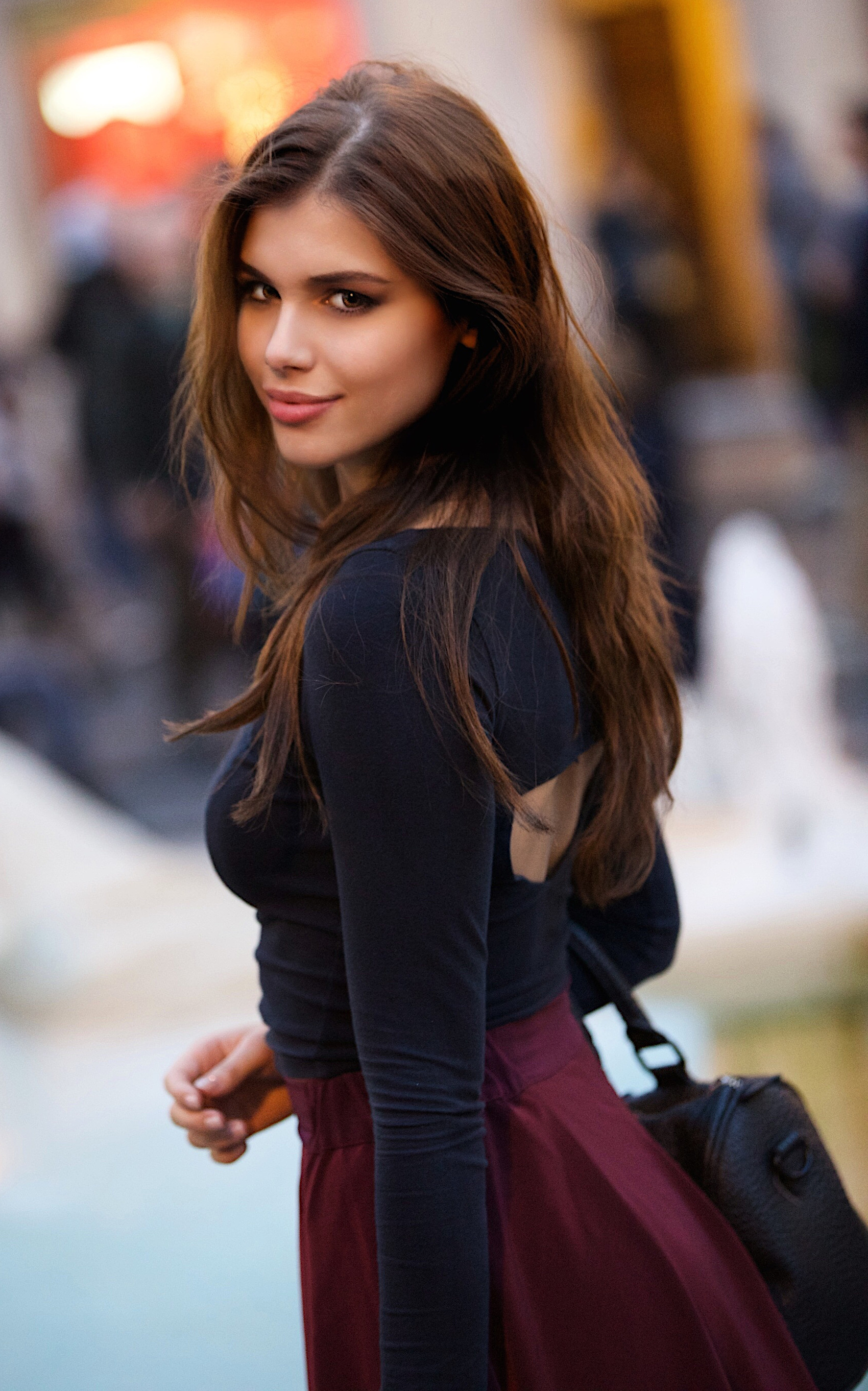
- Mazepa in 2019
- Born: Katharina Nahlik; 19 August 1995 (age 31); Vienna, Austria
- Occupation: Model
- Known for: Miss Vienna 2014
- Spouse: Shilo Mazepa (m. 2019; div. 2023)
- Partner: Lenny Hochstein (2022–2024)
- Modeling information
- Height: 177 cm (5 ft 10 in)
- Hair color: Brown
- Eye color: Brown

Katharina Nahlik (also known as Katharina Mazepa; 19 August 1995) is an Austrian model.

== Early life ==
Katharina Nahlik was born on 19 August 1995, and grew up in the Mariahilf district in Vienna, where she attended the Vienna Bilingual School, and spent one year abroad in Malaysia when she was 15. She studied environmental engineering at BOKU university in Vienna.

== Career ==
In 2014, Nahlik was crowned Miss Vienna, and has worked as an international model since.

== Personal life ==
In 2019, Nahlik married US diplomat Shilo Mazepa in Spoleto, Italy. Amina Dagi, a former Miss Universe contestant, was her bridesmaid. Later that year, the couple moved to Washington D.C. In 2021, she filed for divorce, which was finalised in 2023.

Since 2022, Nahlik had been in a relationship with plastic surgeon Dr. Leonard Hochstein while he was still married to Real Housewives of Miami castmember Lisa Hochstein. They were engaged in July 2023. In September 2024, Lenny and Katharina ended their engagement. However, in December 2024, Hochstein reproposed to Nahlik.

As of 2026, Nahlik lives in Vienna again.
