= Mariahilfer Straße =

Shopping street in Vienna, Austria

Coordinates: 48.198611°N 16.350833°E

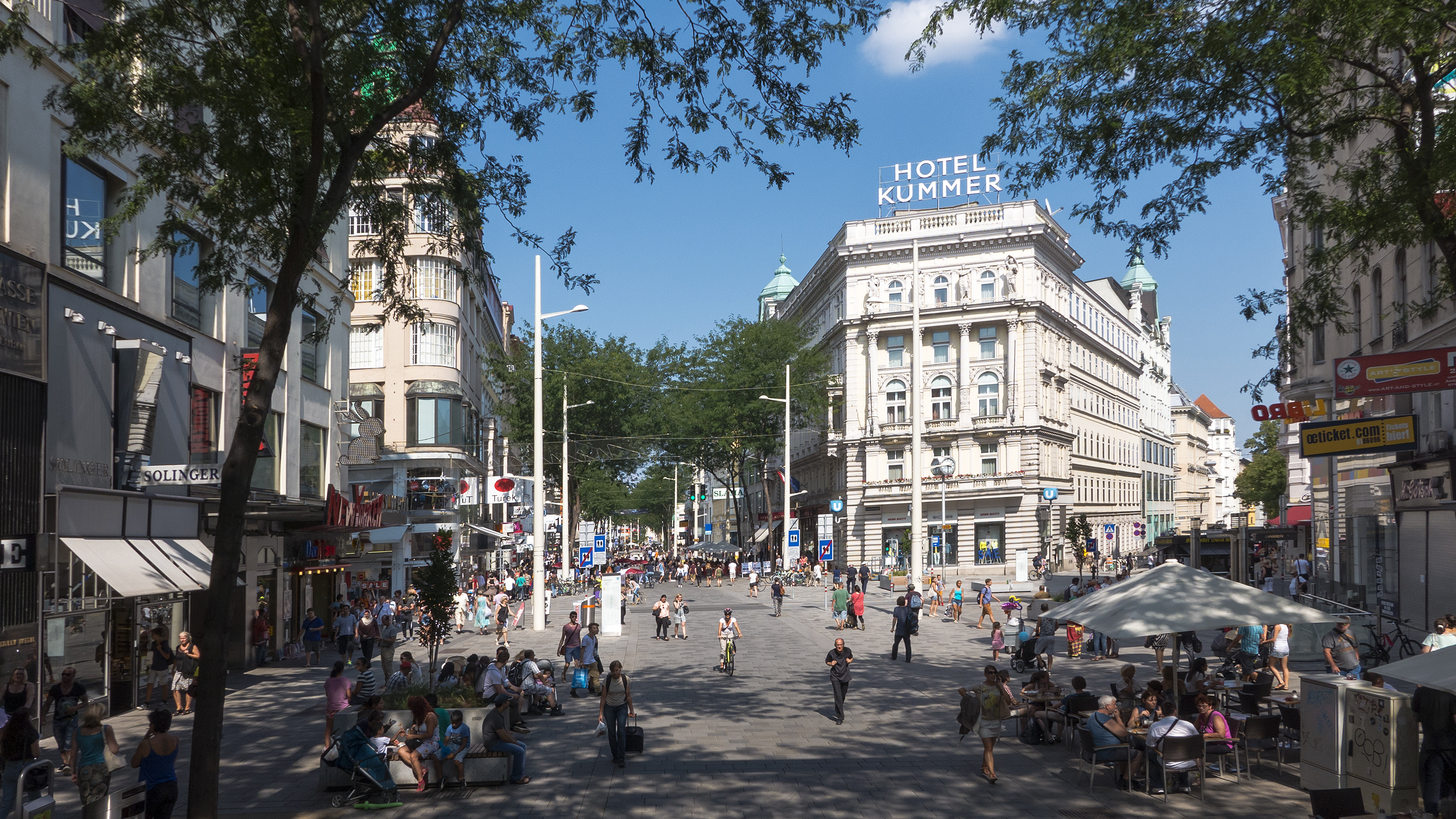
The inner Mariahilfer Strasse at the junction with Neubaugasse (left) and Amerlingstrasse; Schadekgasse branches off to the right

Mariahilfer Straße is the largest and one of the most famous shopping streets in Vienna, Austria. It connects the Innere Stadt with the 15th district, Rudolfsheim-Fünfhaus, and the Westbahnhof railway station. The street was named after Mariahilf, Vienna's 6th district, in 1897, and is commonly referred to as "Mahü".

== History ==
Mariahilfer Straße served as an important route during the Roman era, as evidenced by archaeological discoveries in 1914. The area remained sparsely populated until the 15th century when the first houses were constructed along the street. During the Ottoman sieges of 1529 and 1683, much of the area was destroyed but was subsequently rebuilt in the following decades.

In the 19th century, industrialization led to the transformation of the formerly agricultural suburb into a major commercial district. The construction of the Westbahnhof railway station in 1859 further enhanced its significance. A period of rapid construction followed, replacing the original suburban houses with apartment blocks. During the Second World War, the road sustained significant damage, but post-war reconstruction efforts ensured its continued development as one of the city's most popular shopping streets. The street's first shopping centre, the Generali Center, opened in 1968. Shops that settled on the street include C&A, Thalia, Levi's, and Forever 21.

In 2010, the Red-Green coalition government decided to gradually convert sections of inner Mariahilfer Straße into a pedestrian zone. On August 16, 2013, the section between Kirchengasse and Andreasgasse became a pedestrian zone following minimal construction. The 13A bus initially operated on a red-painted lane but was later rerouted. Cyclists were allowed to ride at walking speed, and taxis could access the zone between 06:00 and 13:00. Other sections were converted into shared spaces with a 20 km/h speed limit for vehicles and no parking allowed.

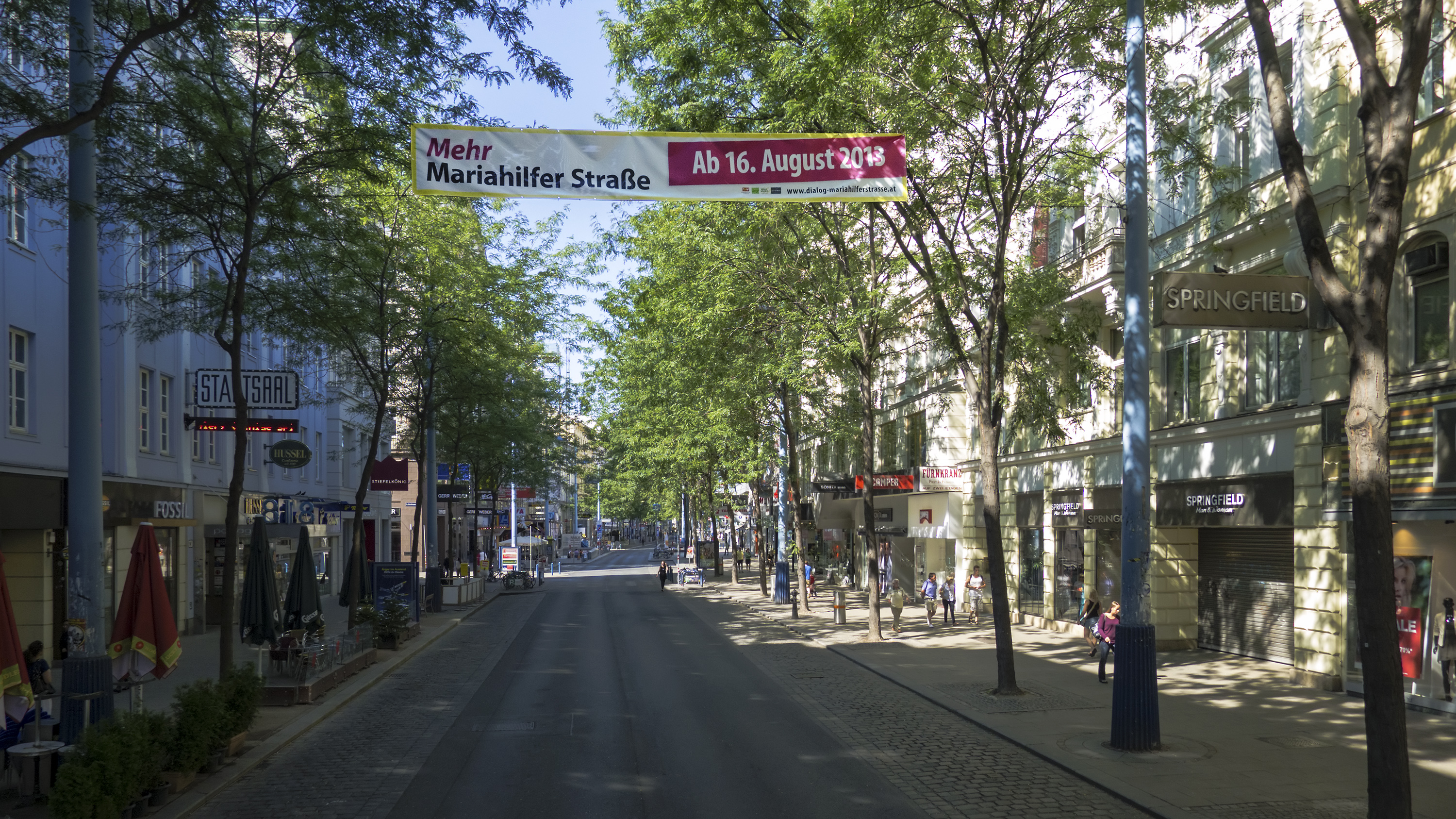
The pedestrian zone in 2013

In early 2014, a citizen survey in the districts of Mariahilf and Neubau supported maintaining the traffic-calmed area, allowing car crossings, and keeping cycling permitted. Construction for permanent changes began on May 19, 2014, incorporating wide lanes for delivery vehicles and cyclists, as well as accessibility improvements. The project, which was led by Green deputy mayor Maria Vassilakou, faced criticism, including from their coalition partner, the SPÖ, although it was ultimately successful.

== Course ==
The street consists of the inner and outer Mariahilfer Straße. These unofficial names are nevertheless used colloquially, as well as by the media and in traffic announcements or underground station entrance signs to distinguish between the sections either side of the Gürtel. However, "Mariahilfer Straße" is sometimes used as a synonym for the shopping street within the Gürtel. The road is 3.7 kilometres long.

Four metro stations servicing three separate lines lie along the Mariahilfer Straße, Museumsquartier (U2) and the Westbahnhof (U3, U6) on either end, with Neubaugasse and Zieglergasse (both U3) in between.

=== Inner Mariahilfer Straße ===
The 1.8 km long inner Mariahilfer Straße stretches from the Museumsquartier to the Mariahilfer Gürtel. This stretch of the road forms the border between Mariahilf and Neubau. The trams, which used to run along the street, were replaced by the underground.

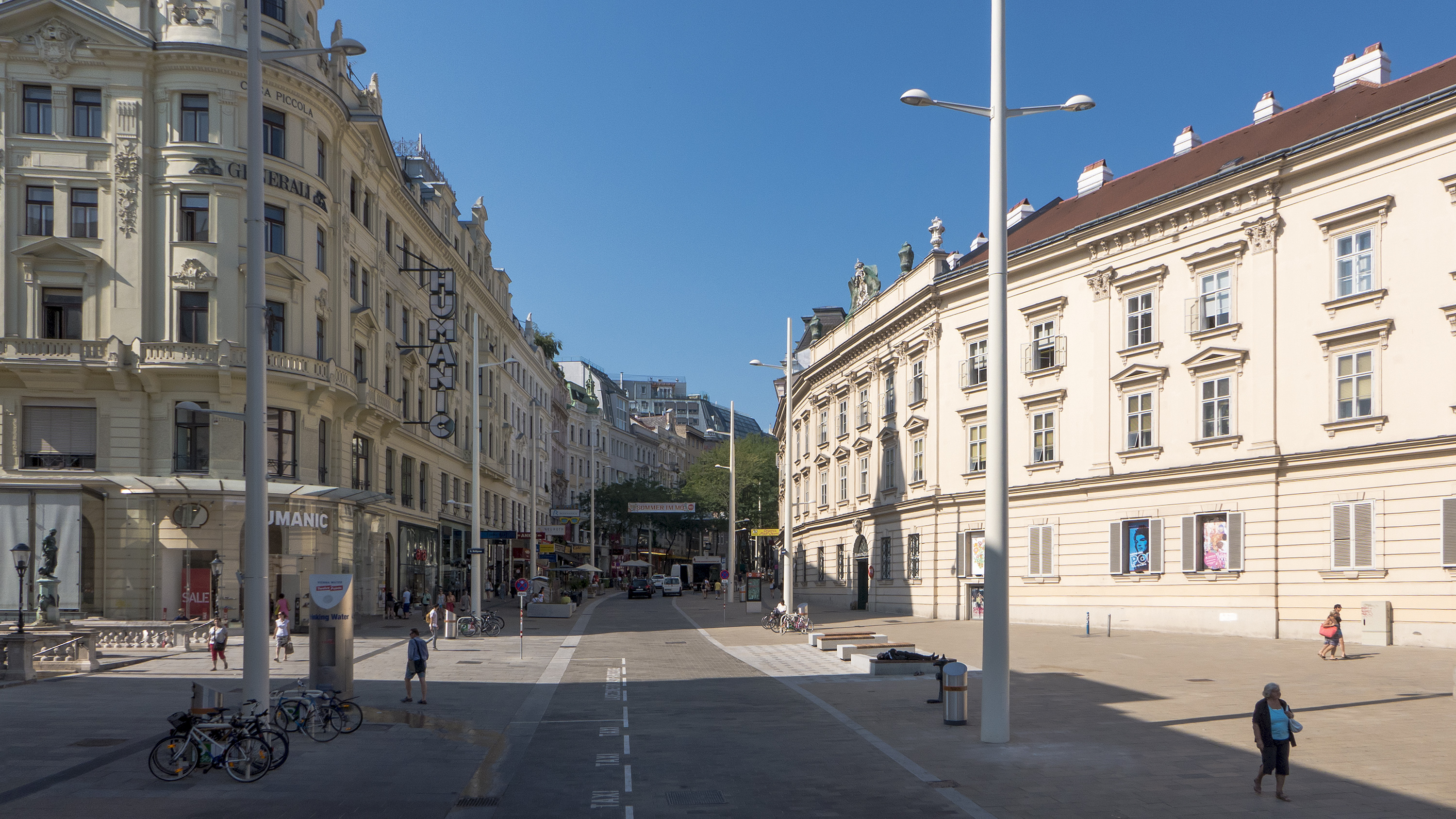
The beginning of the street at the Museumsquartier

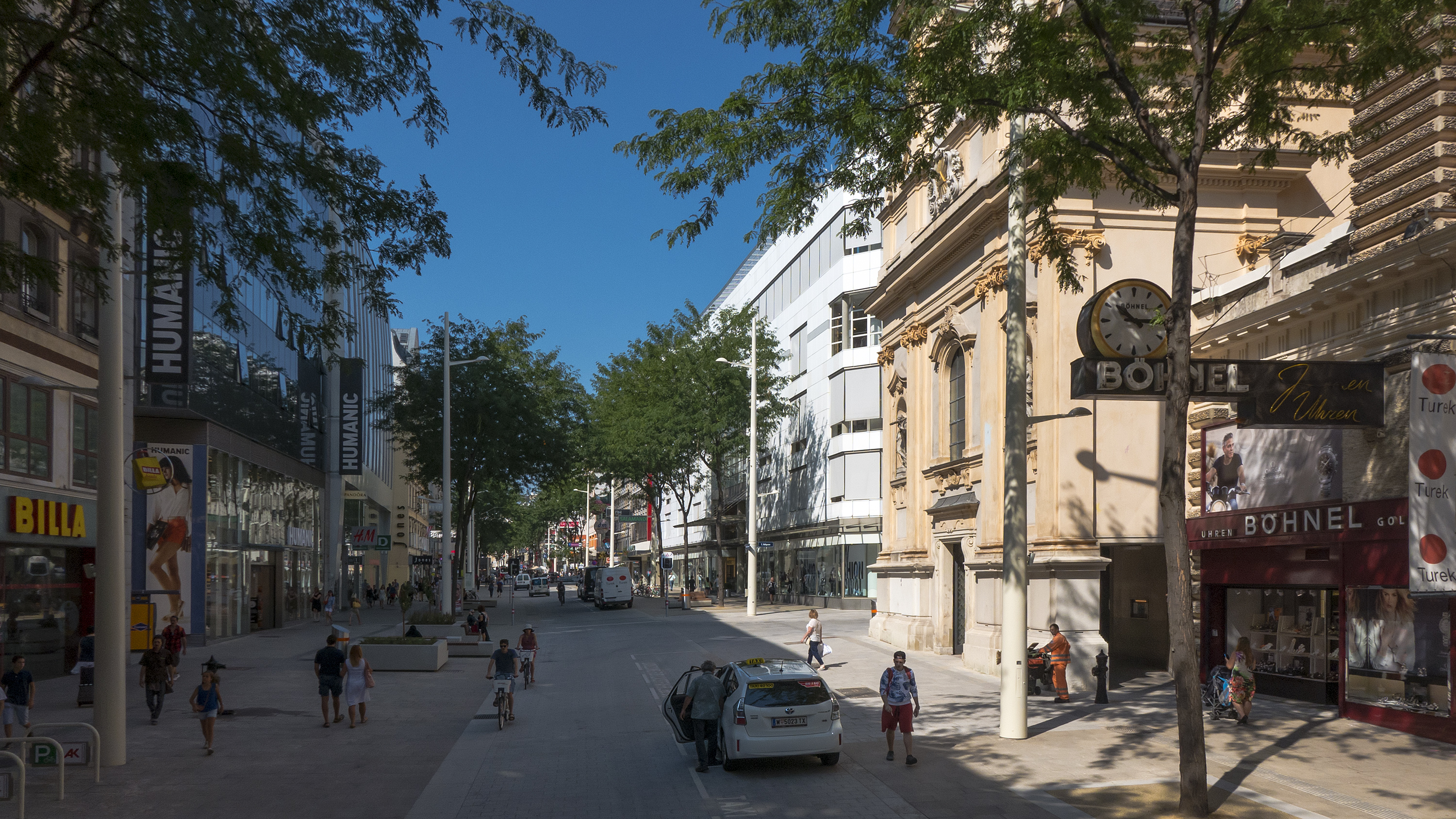
At Stiftgasse

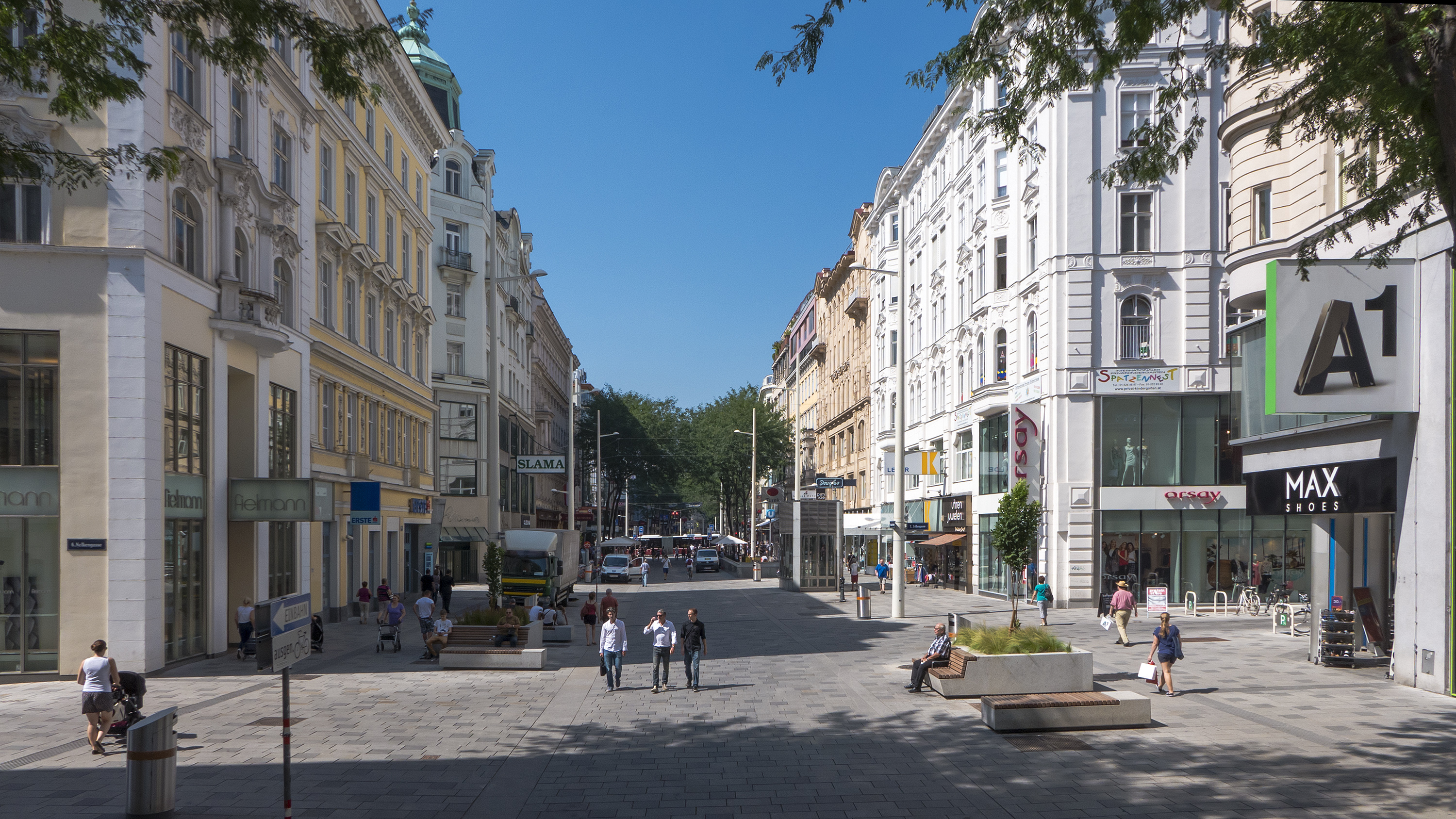
At Nelkengasse

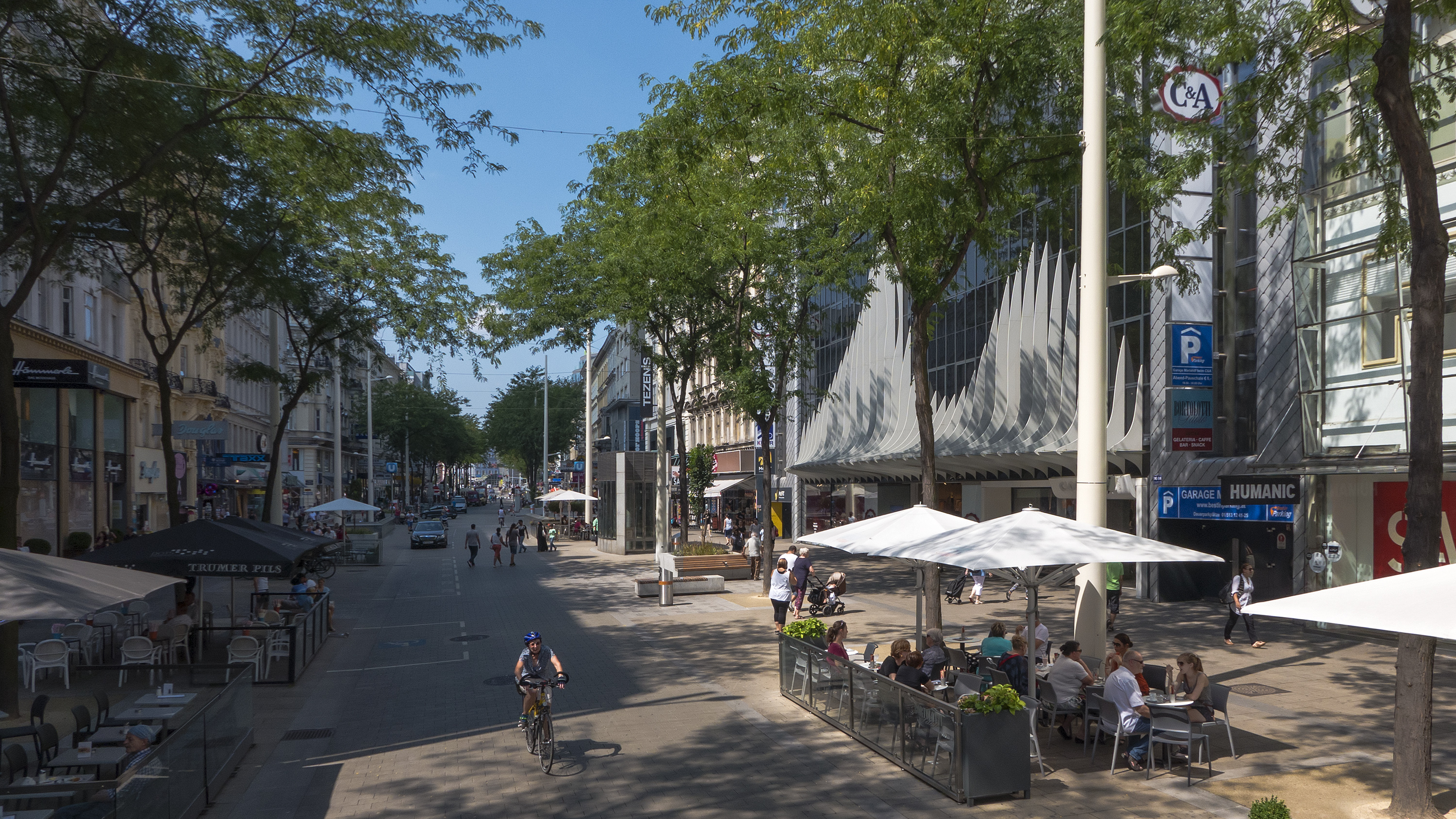
At Zieglergasse

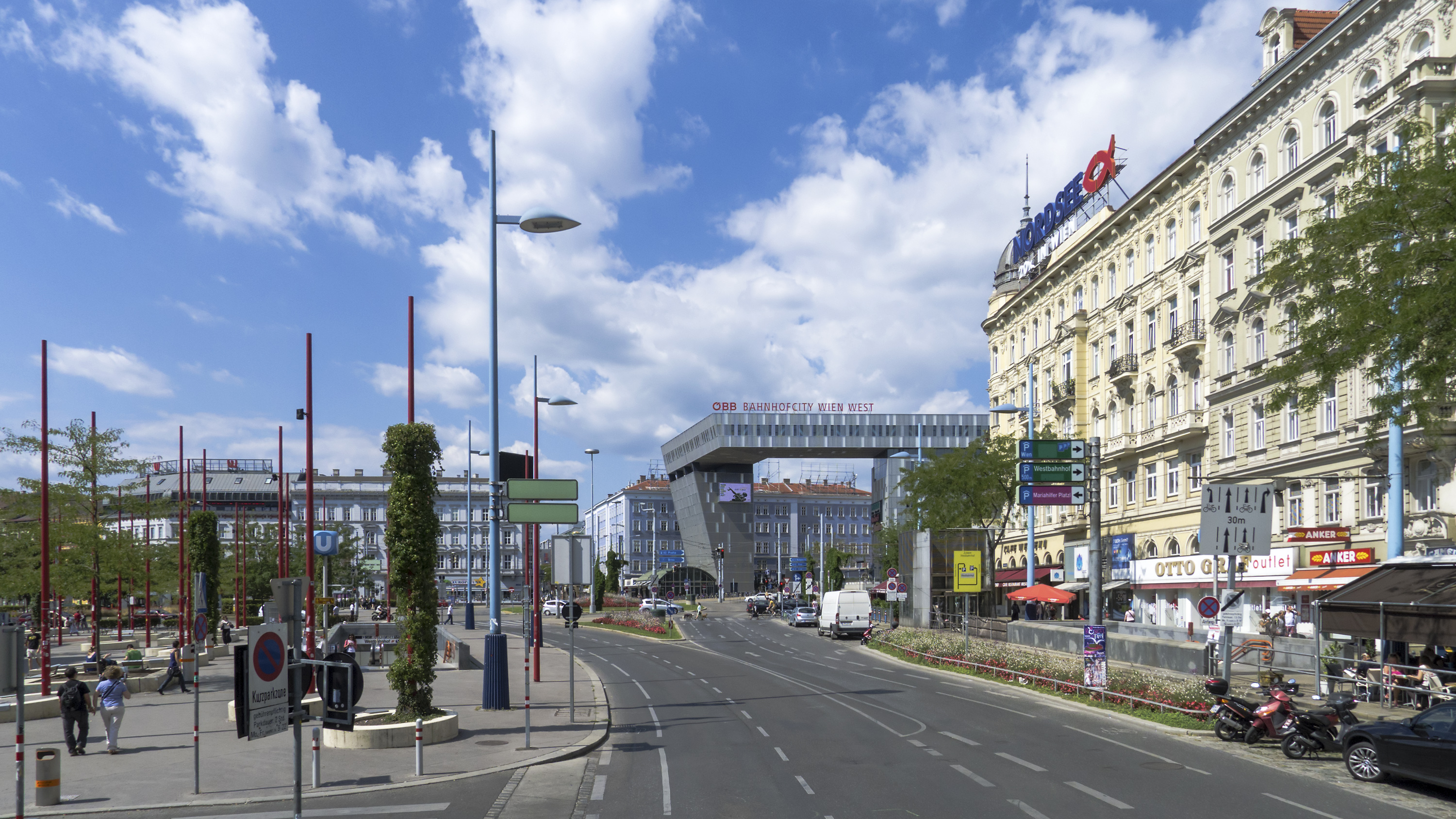
At Christian-Broda-Platz. facing the Westbahnhof

=== Outer Mariahilfer Straße ===
This 1.9 km long section stretches through Rudolfsheim-Fünfhaus from the Mariahilfer Gürtel to the Schlossallee, the road leading into Schönbrunn Palace. At the end of the road are the Vienna Museum of Science and Technology and the Auer-Welsbach-Park. Although there are also numerous shops in the outer Mariahilfer Straße, almost no large or international brand shops have settled in this section. The trams still run here.

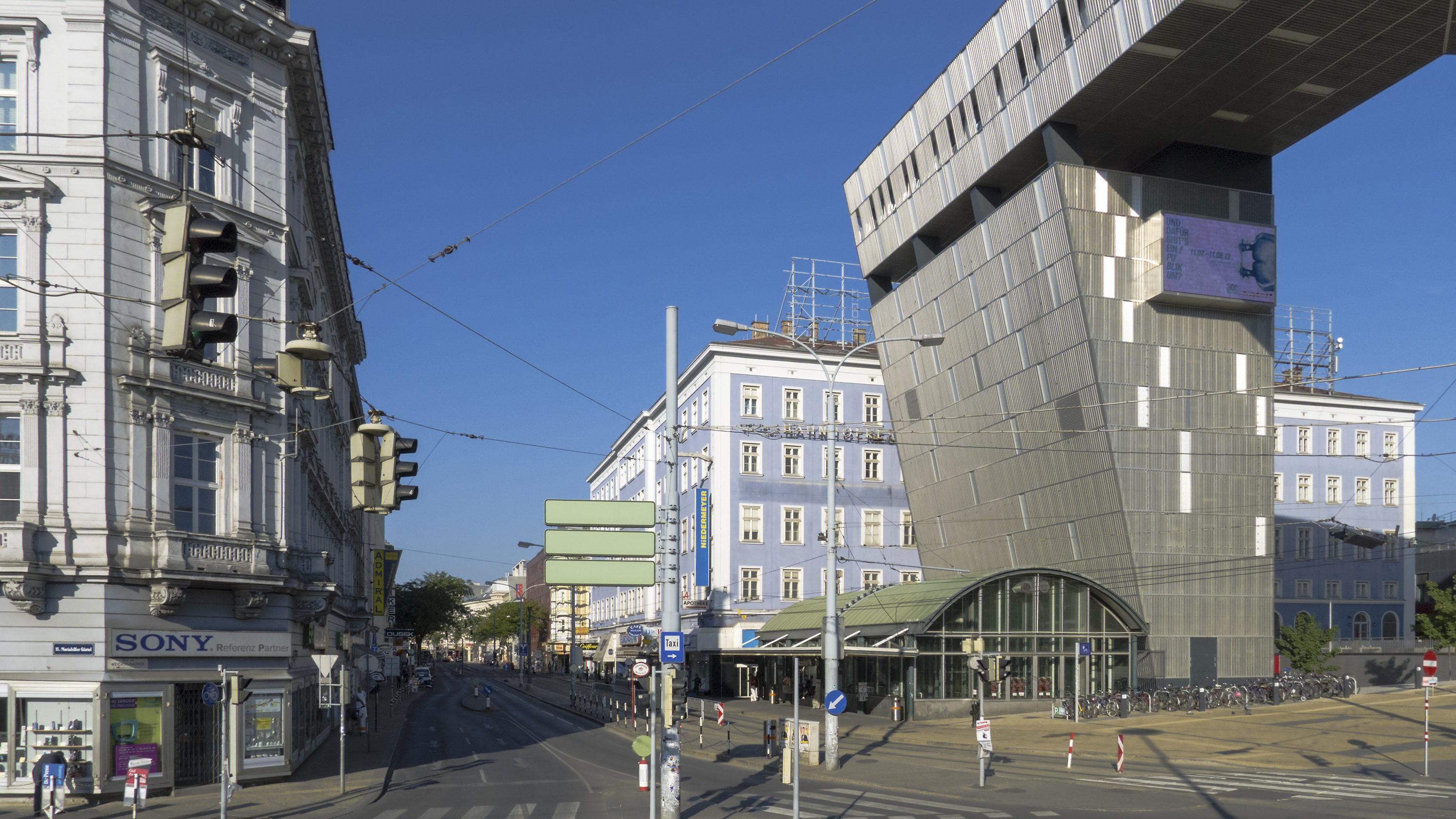
At the Mariahilfer Gürtel

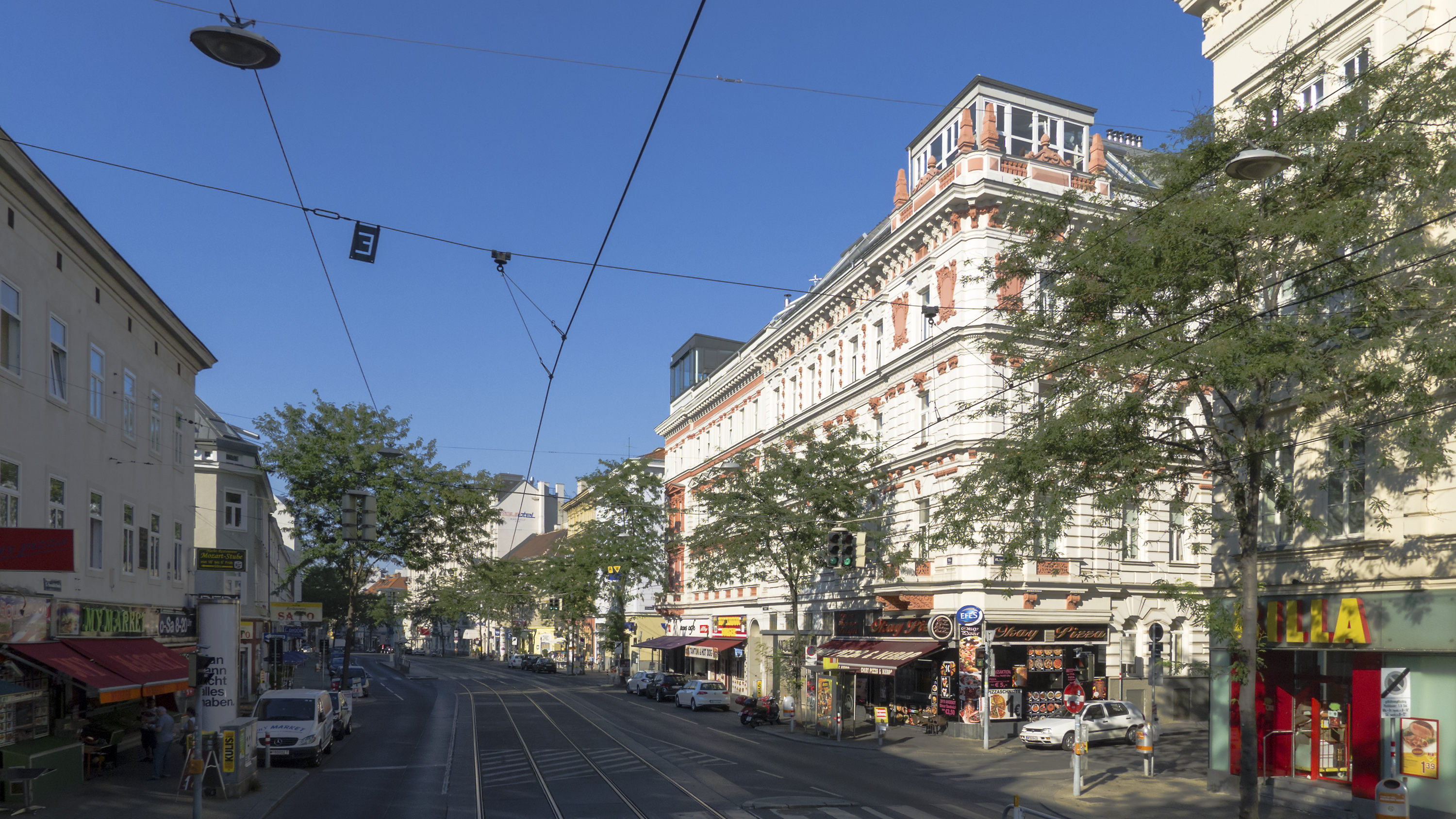
At Zwölfergasse

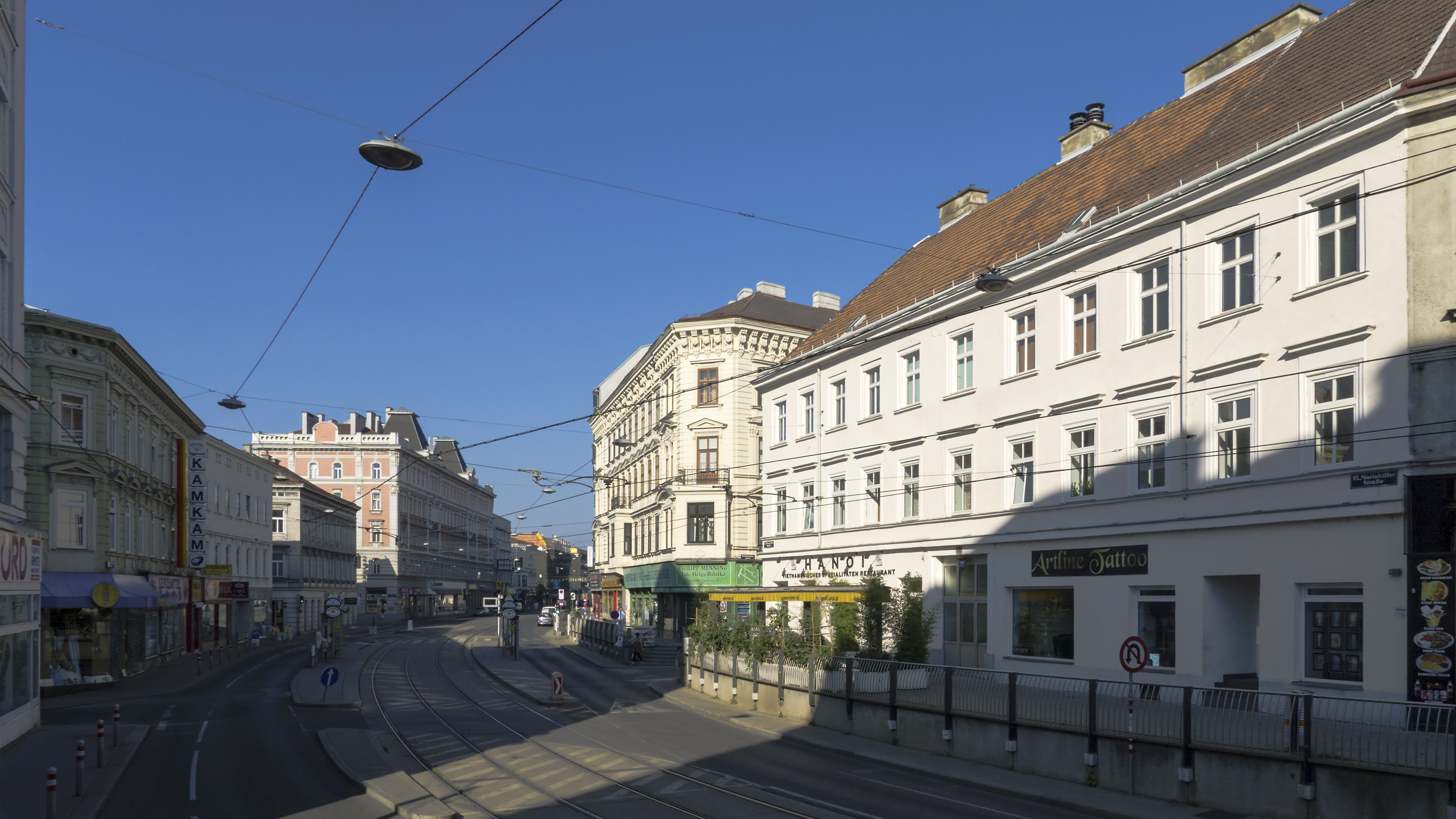
At Clementinengasse

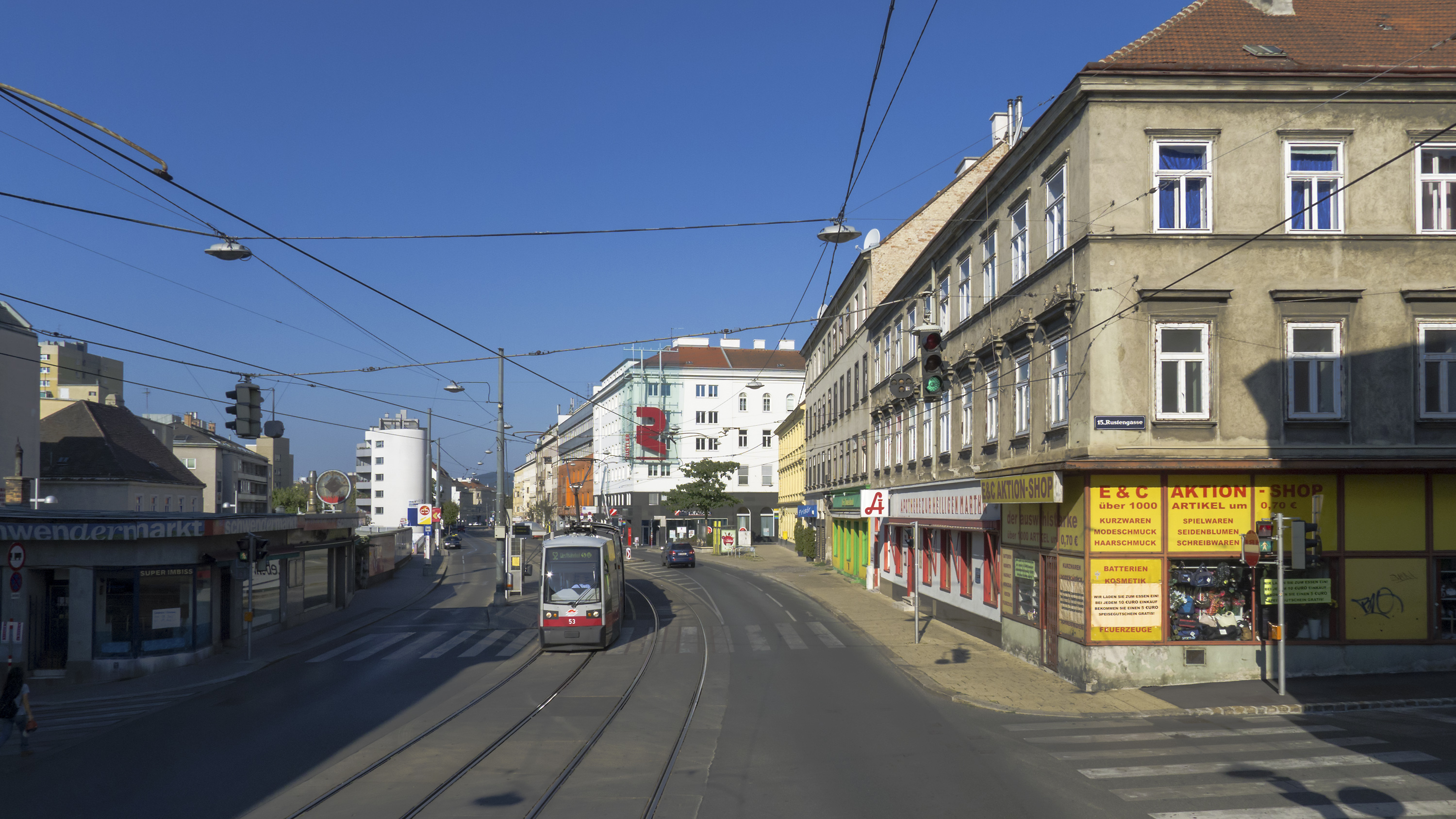
At Rustengasse

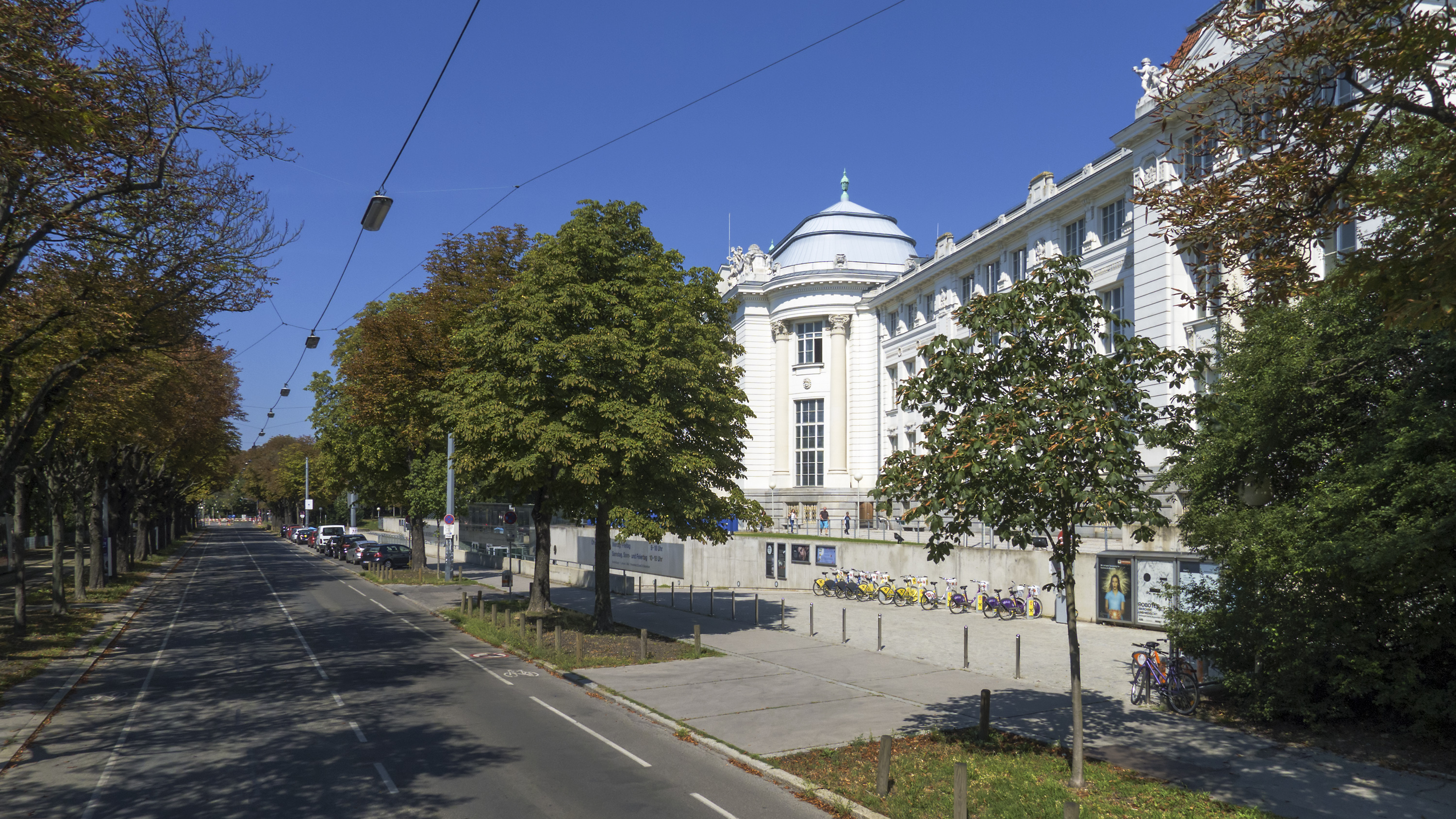
The end of the road by the Vienna Museum of Science and Technology
