= Districts of Vienna =

Administrative subdivisions of Vienna

The districts of Vienna (German: Wiener Gemeindebezirke) are the 23 named city sections of Vienna, Austria, which are numbered for easy reference. They were created from 1850 onwards, when the city area was enlarged by the inclusion of surrounding communities. Although they fill a similar role, Vienna's municipal districts are not administrative districts (Bezirke) as defined by the federal constitution; Vienna is a statutory city and as such is a single administrative district in its entirety.

== Districts ==
No.	District	Coat of arms	Area (km^{2})	Population (2025)	Density per km^{2}	Map
1	Innere Stadt	Innere Stadt	2.869	16,281	5,675	
2	Leopoldstadt	Leopoldstadt	19.242	112,675	5,855	
3	Landstraße	Landstraße	7.403	98,881	13,356	
4	Wieden	Wieden	1.776	33,444	18,831	
5	Margareten	Margareten	2.012	54,851	27,261	
6	Mariahilf	Mariahilf	1.455	31,083	21,362	
7	Neubau	Neubau	1.608	31,330	19,484	
8	Josefstadt	Josefstadt	1.09	24,242	22,240	
9	Alsergrund	Alsergrund	2.976	41,664	14,000	
10	Favoriten	Favoriten	31.823	223,190	7,013	
11	Simmering	Simmering	23.256	112,149	4,822	
12	Meidling	Meidling	8.103	102,293	12,624	
13	Hietzing	Hietzing	37.713	56,108	1,488	
14	Penzing	Penzing	33.76	99,049	2,933	
15	Rudolfsheim-Fünfhaus	Rudolfsheim-Fünfhaus	3.918	75,902	19,372	
16	Ottakring	Ottakring	8.673	102,727	11,844	
17	Hernals	Hernals	11.396	56,767	4,981	
18	Währing	Währing	6.347	51,376	8,095	
19	Döbling	Döbling	24.944	76,074	3,050	
20	Brigittenau	Brigittenau	5.71	86,950	15,228	
21	Floridsdorf	Floridsdorf	44.443	189,551	4,265	
22	Donaustadt	Donaustadt	102.299	228,158	2,230	
23	Liesing	Liesing	32.061	123,714	3,859	

Area and population figures are based on the City of Vienna's district overview and district profile pages; density values are calculated from those figures.

== District locations ==
District locations

The boundaries of each district have been shown as a layer on this map. The following are locations of the 23 districts:

1. Innere Stadt is the city centre, with numerous historical sites and few residents.
2. Leopoldstadt is the island between the Danube and the Donaukanal, with Praterstern, Vienna's most frequented traffic spot, and the Prater with Vienna's iconic Giant Wheel.
3. Landstraße is on the right bank of the Donaukanal, and includes the Belvedere.
4. Wieden is a small district south of the city centre, and includes the Vienna University of Technology.
5. Margareten was separated from Wieden in 1861. The Museum for Social and Economic Affairs (Gesellschafts- und Wirtschaftsmuseum) is located in Margareten. The museum was the base for the development of the Vienna Method.
6. Mariahilf is a small district on the main shopping lane leading to Westbahnhof.
7. Neubau is a small district on the main shopping lane leading to Westbahnhof, and includes the Museumsquartier, a large cultural complex.
8. Josefstadt is a small district close to the Rathaus, Parlament, and the University of Vienna.
9. Alsergrund is the General Hospital district, and includes Sigmund Freud's residence.
10. Favoriten is in the southern part of Vienna, and has the largest population, the new main train station, and the city's thermal spa.
11. Simmering is on the right bank of the Donaukanal, and includes the Zentralfriedhof which is the main cemetery.
12. Meidling is on the southern bank of the Wien river.
13. Hietzing is on the southern bank of the Wien river, and includes Schönbrunn Palace.
14. Penzing is on the northern bank of the Wien river, and was separated from Hietzing in 1938. It includes Otto Wagner's Church Am Steinhof.
15. Rudolfsheim-Fünfhaus is on the northern bank of the Wien river.
16. Ottakring is on the western outskirts and includes Vienna's traditional brewery.
17. Hernals is on the northwestern outskirts of Vienna.
18. Währing is on the northwestern outskirts of Vienna, and includes the Türkenschanzpark around which was founded the University of Natural Resources and Life Sciences, Vienna.
19. Döbling is on the northern outskirts of Vienna, and includes the classical Heurigen district.
20. Brigittenau is on the same island as Leopoldstadt, and was separated in 1900.
21. Floridsdorf is on the left bank of the Danube, and includes industry areas. It is the northernmost part of Vienna.
22. Donaustadt is on the left bank of the Danube, and is the largest district in size. It includes the Vienna International Centre, a campus and building complex hosting the United Nations Office at Vienna as well as Vienna's largest conference center.
23. Liesing is the southernmost least population dense district, and includes the Wotruba Church.

By looking at the postal code it can be determined in which district a given address is located. Austrian postal codes are 4 digits, where the first usually indicates the federal state. For Vienna, postal codes are formatted 1XXA where 1 denotes Vienna, XX the district number (if it is a single digit then with a leading zero), and A is the number of the post office (irrelevant in this case, usually zero). For example, addresses in the seventh district of Neubau have the postal code 1070. Postcodes which do not follow this district-postcode correlation are 1300 for the Vienna International Airport located in Lower Austria near Schwechat, 1400 for the UN Complex, 1450 for the Austria Center Vienna, and 1500 for the Austrian UN-Forces.

The numbering of the districts reflects to some degree when they were incorporated into Vienna.

- The first district comprises not much more than Vienna's historic centre, which used to be the entire city until 1850.
- Districts 2–9 (and 20 which was in 1900 separated from the second district), incorporated in 1850, are known as Innenbezirke (inner districts) and composed of the former Vorstädte, which were located inside the Linienwall, the second ring of fortifications around Vienna. Those districts are located within the Gürtel today.
- The other districts, incorporated between 1874 and 1938, mainly in 1892, are known as Außenbezirke (outer districts) and are the former Vororte.

== Politics ==
The seats of Bezirksvorsteher (political district head) and Bezirksvertretung (district assembly) are located in the respective districts, with the exception of the 14th district, whose political representatives reside in the 13th district (to which much of the 14th had belonged until 1938). The Magistratisches Bezirksamt (district office of the city administration, not headed by the political district head) in four locations combines services for two districts:

- for the 1st and 8th district in the 1st,
- for the 4th and 5th district in the 5th,
- for the 6th and 7th district in the 7th,
- for the 13th and 14th district in the 13th.

Hence Vienna has 19 district offices.

Since 2002, in Austria, instead of the police the mayors are responsible for objects found in public places. In Vienna, the mayor has ordered the district offices to perform the functions police stations have performed concerning found objects until then. Since 2005, by federal law the districts in all of Austria are responsible for issuing passports and registering residents, tasks until then covered in Vienna by the Federal Police. The mayor of Vienna again has ordered the district offices of the Magistrat to perform these functions.

Optimizing overhead costs has gone farther with the Federal Police in Vienna. The 23 District Police Commands in 2002 have been reduced to 14 City Police Commands. Reducing the number of small districts by mergers, as happened in Berlin after the 1990 reunification of Germany, has not even been discussed in Vienna, since the district assemblies function as breeding factories for the political parties' representatives.

== See also ==
For the creation and administration of the districts, see Vienna § Districts and enlargement.

- Arrondissements of Paris
- History of Vienna
- List of urban areas in the European Union
