= Fillgraderstiege =

Staircase in Vienna, Mariahilf

Coordinates: 48°12′00″N 16°21′31″E

- Staircase
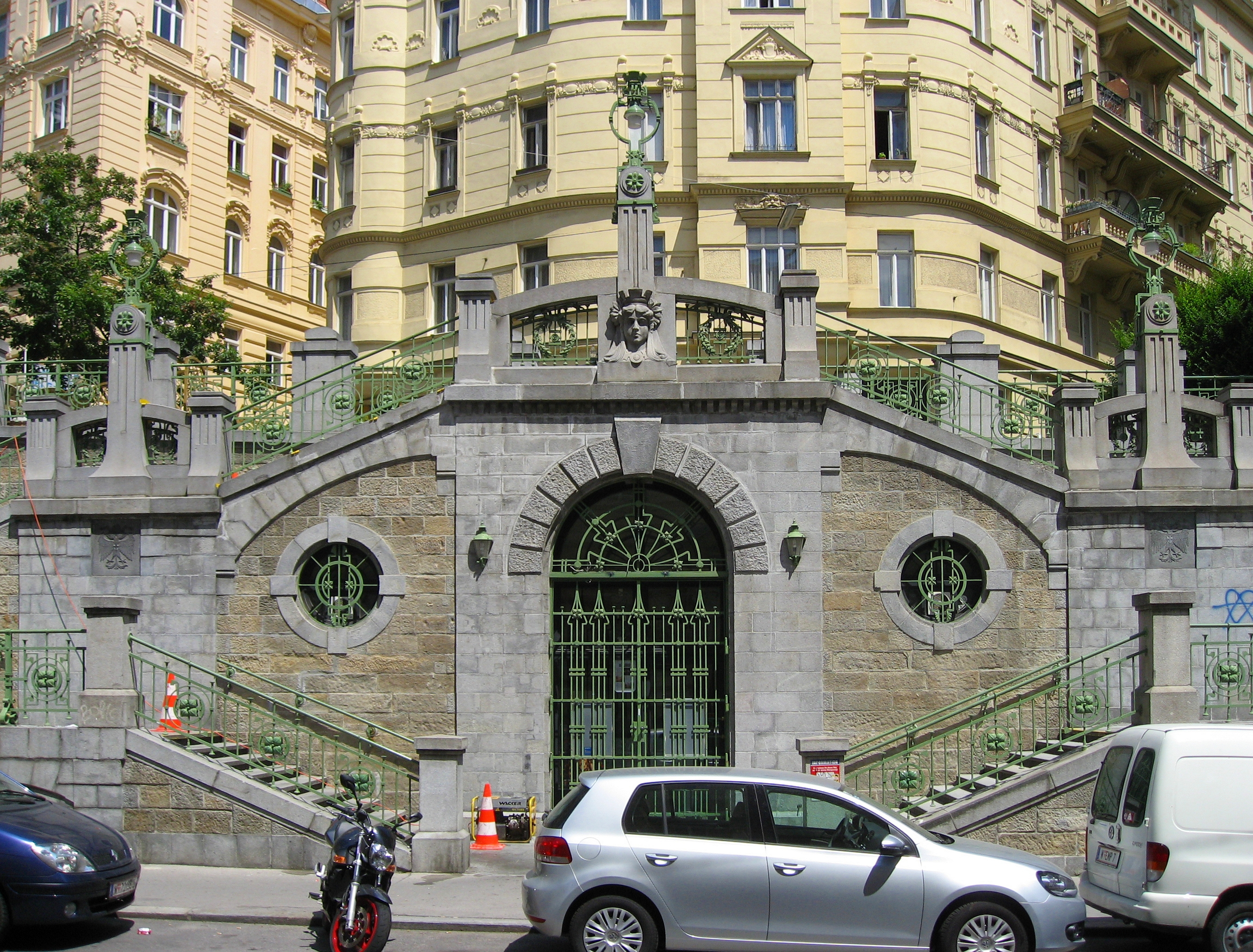
- Exterior staircase in Vienna, Austria
- Design: Max Hegele
- Opened: 1907
- Architectural style: Art Nouveau
- Interactive map of Fillgraderstiege

The Fillgraderstiege is a staircase in the sixth district of Vienna, Mariahilf. It was built from 1905 to 1907 and designed by Max Hegele, a student of Victor Luntz and Carl Hasenauer, in an Art Nouveau style to connect the two streets, Fillgradergasse and Theobaldgasse.

The stairs were blocked off in 1981, having been worn down for almost 80 years, and were then repaired between 1982 and 1984, in the process of which a café and art gallery were added in a previously unused inner room behind the stairs, both of which opened on the 1 August 1985.

The Fillgraderstiege staircase was named the fourth most beautiful steps in Europe in a 2004 poll of European art professors .
