= Neubau =

Coordinates: 48°12′09″N 16°20′53″E

Neubau Neibau (Bavarian)
- 7th District of Vienna
- Coat of arms

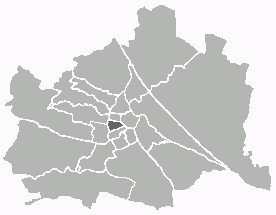
- Location of the district within Vienna
- Country: Austria
- City: Vienna

Government
  - District Director: Markus Reiter (Green)
  - First Deputy: Isabelle Uhl (Green)
  - Second Deputy: Gallus Vögel (SPÖ)
  - Representation (40 Members): Greens 20, SPÖ 8, NEOS 4 FPÖ 3, ÖVP 3,

Area
  - Total: 1.61 km^{2} (0.62 sq mi)

Population (2016-01-01)
  - Total: 32,027
  - Density: 19,900/km^{2} (51,500/sq mi)
- Postal code: 1070
- Address of District Office: Hermanngasse 24-26; 1070 Wien
- Website: www.wien.gv.at/bezirke/neubau/

Neubau (German pronunciation: [ˈnɔʏbaʊ]; Viennese: Neibau; "New Build") is the seventh district of Vienna (German: 7. Bezirk). It is located near the center of Vienna and was established as a district in 1850, but borders changed later. Neubau is a heavily populated urban area, with a major shopping area and residential buildings. It has a population of 32,027 people (as of 2016-01-01) within an area of 1.61 km² (0.62 sq.mi.).

It consists of the former Vorstädte of Neubau, Altlerchenfeld, St. Ulrich, Schottenfeld and Spittelberg. The district borders are formed by Lerchenfelder Straße in the north, Mariahilfer Straße in the south, Neubaugürtel in the west, and Museumstraße and Museumsplatz in the east.

== History ==
In the 18th century, Neubau was the location of the city's silk factories. At this time, the area became densely populated. Today, it is an important shopping district, especially in the Mariahilfer Straße and Neubaugasse. Many pubs, popular among the district's large student population, are located in the Spittelberg neighborhood. The Volkstheater Wien, one of Vienna's large mainstream theatres, and the Austrian Ministry of Justice are located in Neubau, as well as the Museumsquartier, a centre dedicated to modern art, housing for example the Leopold Collection.

In the 2001 communal elections, Neubau became the first district in Austria with a Green Party plurality (32.6% of the votes).

In the 2004 European elections the Green Party received 41% of all votes, which is more than Social Democratic Party and Austrian People's Party together.

Like Mariahilf, Neubau is known as one of Vienna's districts with the youngest, most liberal, and urban population.

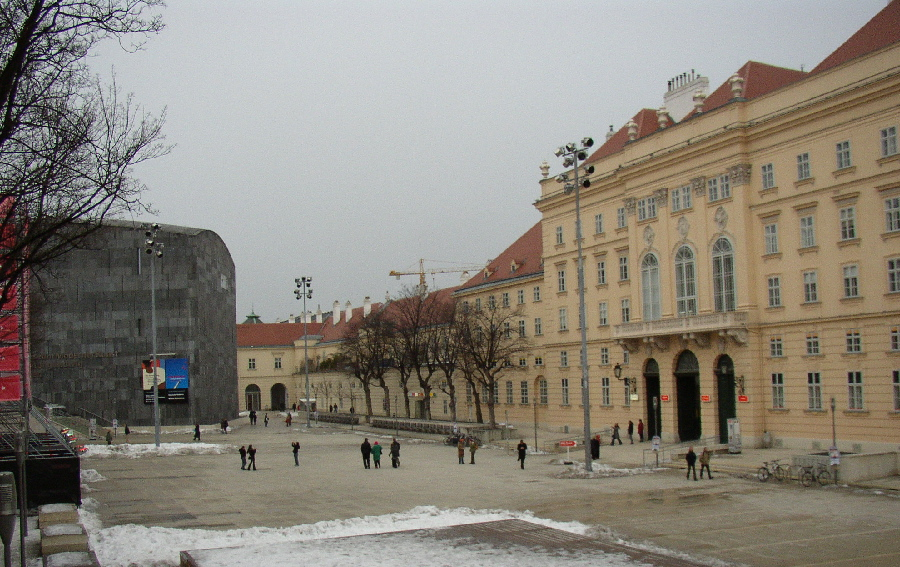
Museumsquartier

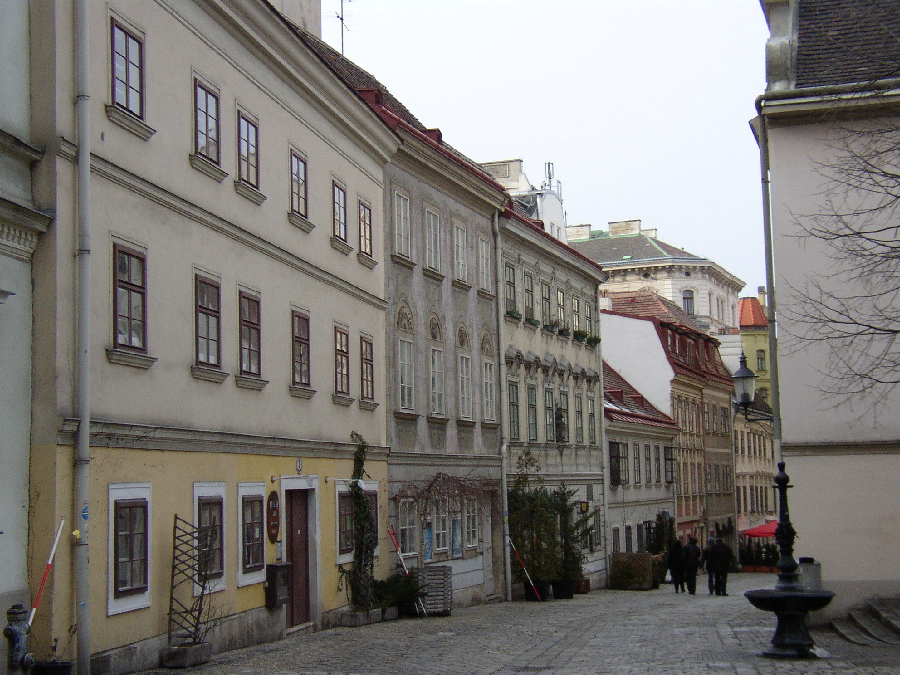
Spittelberg

== Politics ==
District Directors since 1945
| Josef Matz (KPÖ) | 4/1945 -7/1945 |
| Wilhelm Dürnbacher (ÖVP) | 1945–1950 |
| Ferdinand König (ÖVP) | 1950–1954 |
| Franz Glamm (ÖVP) | 1954–1959 |
| Peter Platzer (ÖVP) | 1959–1964 |
| Franz Pospisil (ÖVP) | 1964–1965 |
| Otto Limanovsky (ÖVP) | 1965–1978 |
| Josef Karrer (ÖVP) | 1978–1991 |
| Herbert Tamchina (SPÖ) | 1991–1998 |
| Gabriele Zimmermann (SPÖ) | 1998–2001 |
| Thomas Blimlinger (Greens) | 2001-2007 |
| Markus Reiter (Greens) | 2007- |

After the Second World War, the ÖVP had the largest party vote until 1991, when it was displaced by the SPÖ. In 2001, the SPÖ in turn was displaced, this time by the Greens.

At the 2010 elections, the Greens increased their vote, the Liberal Forum vote remained at 1.1%, and the BZÖ increased their vote from their 2005 level of 0.8% to 1.1%.

District Political Parties 1991-2010
| Jahr | SPÖ | ÖVP | FPÖ | Grüne | LIF | BZÖ | Sonstige |
| 1991 | 32.2 | 28.5 | 17.1 | 20.1 | -- | -- | 2.1 |
| 1996 | 27.2 | 21.4 | 19.7 | 18.8 | 10.2 | -- | 2.8 |
| 2001 | 29.4 | 17.9 | 14.4 | 32.6 | 4.7 | -- | 1.0 |
| 2005 | 27.5 | 18.1 | 7.3 | 43.3 | 1.2 | 0.8 | 1.9 |
| 2010 | 25.4 | 13.9 | 10.7 | 45.4 | 1.1 | 1.1 | 2.5 |

This district was the first in 2001 and until the 2004 (European Elections 2004) the only district in Austria where the Greens had a relative majority (plurality).

== People ==
- Johann Christoph Voigtländer (1732–1797) (de)
- Josef Lanner (1801–1843)
- Carl Michael Ziehrer (1843–1922) (de)
- Gustav Klimt (1862–1918)
- Ludwig Boltzmann (1844–1906), physicist, known for his contributions to statistical mechanics and thermodynamics
- Karl Farkas (1893–1971)
- Fritz Hochwälder (1911–1986)
- Fritz Muliar (1919–2009)
- Theodor Graf Latour (de)

=== Sankt Ulrich ===
- Johann Strauß II (1825–1899), born here

=== Historic sites ===
- St. Ulrich

== Twin town ==
- Erzsébetváros, Hungary
