= Mariahilf =

Coordinates: 48°11′43″N 16°20′59″E

Mariahilf Mariahüf (Bavarian)
- 6th District of Vienna
- Coat of arms

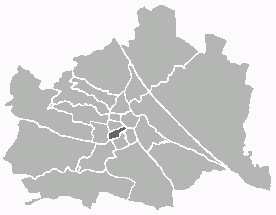
- Location of the district within Vienna
- Country: Austria
- City: Vienna

Government
  - District Director: Markus Rumelhart (SPÖ)
  - First Deputy: Vlasta Osterauer-Novak (SPÖ)
  - Second Deputy: Susanne Jerusalem (Green)
  - Representation (40 Members): SPÖ 15, Green 14, FPÖ 3, ÖVP 3, NEOS 3, KPÖ 2

Area
  - Total: 1.48 km^{2} (0.57 sq mi)

Population (2016)
  - Total: 31,621
  - Density: 21,400/km^{2} (55,300/sq mi)
- Postal code: A-1060
- Address of District Office: Amerlingstraße 11; A-1060 Wien
- Website: wien.gv.at/bezirke/marihilf/

Mariahilf (German pronunciation: [maˌʁiːaˈhɪlf]; Viennese: Mariahüf; "Mary's help") is the 6th municipal district of Vienna, Austria (German: 6. Bezirk). It is near the center of Vienna and was established as a district in 1850. Mariahilf is a heavily populated urban area with many residential buildings. It has a population of 31,621 (as of January 2016) within an area of 1.48 square kilometres (0.6 sq mi).

== Location ==
Mariahilf is located southwest of Vienna's centre (1st district). In the north, Mariahilfer Straße, Vienna's most important shopping street, is its border with Neubau, in the south, the valley of the Vienna River, in the west, the Gürtel beltway.

It consists of the five neighbourhoods (historical Vorstädte, i.e. towns): Mariahilf, Gumpendorf, Windmühle, Magdalenengrund and Laimgrube.

== History ==
First settlements around the Roman roads of the area developed around the year 1000. In 1428, the name Im Schöff is mentioned for the first time, but this name was lost when the copy of a sacral painting from Passau was installed in a chapel of the graveyard, which came to be known as Mariahilf ("Mary's help").

More intensive settlement started only after the Second Turkish Siege of Vienna in 1683. The area was of some importance because the road to Schönbrunn Palace led through it.

Gumpendorf was mentioned in 1130 for the first time and developed from a Roman watchtower. It was subject to various feudal lords and was sold to the municipality of Vienna in 1798.

Magdalenengrund was originally known as Im Saugraben an der Wien auf der Gstätten ("In the sow pit on the Wien on the meadow") and consisted only of vineyards. In 1698, some plots were released for construction.

The Laimgrube (clay pit) is probably the oldest part of Mariahilf. It was mentioned in 1291 for the first time, but has existed already since the 11th century. Its name is derived from the clay soil, which was used to produce bricks.

Windmühle (windmill) developed from a feudal holding used by various monastic orders. In 1529 it was destroyed during the First Turkish Siege. Emperor Ferdinand I had the ownership transferred to Johann Francolin, subject to the condition that he should build windmills there. However, he had only one mill built.

On March 6, 1850, the five Vorstädte of Gumpendorf, Mariahilf, Windmühle, Magdalenengrund and Laimgrube became part of Vienna as the Fifth District, Mariahilf. When Wieden was split into two districts in 1861, it became the 6th District. In 1862, some areas north of Mariahilfer Straße were ceded to the 7th District (Neubau).

Towards the end of the 19th century, Mariahilf had developed to become an important business district of Vienna. The Mariahilfer Strasse was a major shopping street; however, the big department stores were beyond the district boundary, over in the 7th District. The Mariahilfer area influenced the roads for mainly small and medium-sized businesses.

Between 1890 and 1907, the Kaunitzgasse steam power plant became one of the first electricity works in Vienna. Following the acquisition of the originally privately operated power plant, by the municipality of Vienna, it was decommissioned and converted into a substation.

"Erinnern für die Zukunft" (Remembrance for the Future) is a memorial project for the many residents of Mariahilf district who were murdered by the Nazi dictatorship in the 1938-1945 period.

Mariahilf is home to many of Vienna's gay and lesbian residents and contains a sizable concentration of bars, clubs, restaurants and shops catering to the community, along with the Rosa Lila Villa community center.

In the 1990s, there were two minor changes in the district boundaries: in 1995 in the area of the belt on the border at the 15th District, and 1996 in the Europe Square in front of the West Railway Station, where the 6th, 7th and 15th District meet. Both border changes affected mainly the transport structures. The district affiliation of residential areas did not change.

== Population ==
Historical population
Year	Pop.	±%
1869	67,642	—
1880	64,535	−4.6%
1890	64,323	−0.3%
1900	62,212	−3.3%
1910	64,670	+4.0%
1923	54,540	−15.7%
1934	49,785	−8.7%
1939	44,866	−9.9%
1951	46,372	+3.4%
1961	41,216	−11.1%
1971	33,633	−18.4%
1981	28,771	−14.5%
1991	30,298	+5.3%
2001	27,866	−8.0%
2011	29,375	+5.4%
2021	30,995	+5.5%
Source: Censuses

The Mariahilf District was already, after its 1850 founding, very densely populated. In 1869, the district area had 67,642 inhabitants, a figure that was never surpassed. Until the beginning of the First World War, the population declined only slightly and remained largely stable. After the First World War began, the population almost continuously decreased. However, according to the last census in 2001, the population has largely stabilized and since 2006 has even risen slightly to 29,523 people.

=== Population structure ===
The age of people in Mariahilf, in 2001, differed in several ways from the Vienna citywide averages. So, Mariahilf had fewer children, but more young adults than the average for Vienna. In 2001, the proportion of residents under 15 years was, with 12.4%, below the Vienna value of 14.7%. The population aged 20 to 39 years in Mariahilf was, with 34.4%, more than the Vienna-average of 30.9%. The proportion of the population aged 60 years or more was 19.2%, slightly below the Vienna average (21.7%). The gender distribution in the district area corresponded to the community trend, with 47.1% men and 52.9% women. Mariahilf's 35.8% compared, against Vienna's city average of 41.2%, as much less often married than the average for Vienna.

=== Origin and language ===
The proportion of foreign-district residents in 2005 was 19.6% (Vienna citywide: 18.7%), and increased over 2001 (17.8%), along with the rising trend in the entire State. The highest proportion of foreigners, in 2005, represented approximately a 3.6% share of the district population as nationals from Serbia and Montenegro. Another 2.4% were Angolan, 1.5% Turkish, 1.3% Polish and 0.8% had Croatian or Bosnian citizenship. In total, for 2001, nearly 26.6% of the population of Mariahilf had not been born in Austria. About 5.6% expressed as a colloquial language Serbian, with Turkish 3.5% and 2.3% Croatian.

=== Religious preferences ===
The religion of the people in Mariahilf, during the 2001 census, ranked about average for Vienna, only the proportion of people with Roman Catholic or Islamic religion was slightly below average. In 2001, 47.4% of the inhabitants had membership in the Roman Catholic Church (Vienna citywide: 49.2%). There are three district Roman Catholic parishes, with the City Deanery 6 / 7. About 6.4% of residents were Islamic faith, 6.0% belonged to the Orthodox Church, and 5.2% were Protestant. Nearly 26.8% of the district population did not belong to any religious group, and 8.2% had no religion or other religious preference indicated.

== Politics ==
District Directors since 1945
Dr. Leder (unknown)	4/1945
Franz Löwner (SPÖ)	4/1945–1946
Karl Bittner (ÖVP)	1946–1954
Rudolf Krammer (ÖVP)	1954–1969
Hubert Feilnreiter (SPÖ)	1969–1977
Werner Jank (SPÖ)	1977–1978
Franz Blauensteiner (ÖVP)	1978–1984
Kurt Pint (ÖVP)	1984–1997
Erich Achleitner (ÖVP)	1997–2001
Renate Kaufmann (SPÖ)	2001–2014
Markus Rumelhart (SPÖ)	2014–

The Mariahilf district has always been contested between the political parties ÖVP and SPÖ. While the ÖVP commanded the majority in the years after the Second World War until 1969, it lost the district to the SPÖ in that year. After the SPÖ lost the majority again in 1978, the ÖVP was able to dominate the following elections.

When the Greens entered the district politics in the late 80s, the ÖVP and SPÖ started to rapidly lose votes. The competition with the Liberal Forum (LIF) in 1996 had a similar effect. The ÖVP also lost heavily in the elections of 2001. The SPÖ, after the losses of 1996, was able to compensate for its former losses and reclaimed the majority in the district.

In 2001 the Greens came in a close third to the ÖVP, whereas the Liberal Forum and the FPÖ suffered heavy losses. In the 2005 elections, the trend continued: The FPÖ lost heavily in the vote again and the Liberal Forum lost their seat on the district council, whereas the SPÖ and the Greens gained more votes. In 2005 the Greens came in second for the first time and thus attained the office of deputy district director. In the elections of 2010, the Greens and the ÖVP suffered heavy losses, while the SPÖ, FPÖ and BZÖ gained more votes.

District Political Parties 1991–2010
Jahr	SPÖ	ÖVP	FPÖ	Grüne	LIF	BZÖ	Sonstige
1991	30.2	38.5	15.2	14.1	--	--	2.0
1996	24.1	34.2	17.1	15.0	8.8	--	0.8
2001	30.7	25.7	13.7	24.9	4.1	--	0.9
2005	35.6	25.4	7.3	28.9	0.8	0.7	1.3
2010	37.1	18.1	11.1	26.1	1.6	0.8	3.4

== Education ==
Beside some buildings of the Vienna University of Technology, Mariahilf hosts the Franz Schubert Conservatory and the central vocational schools for electrical engineering, information technology, metallurgy, glass-ceramic, sanitary engineering, heating engineering and air conditioning technology.

== Coat of arms ==
The coat of arms of Mariahilf

The district's arms combine those of the five independent communities from which it was formed in 1850:

- The inescutcheon (for Mariahilf) shows Don John of Austria standing in a ship flying the imperial banner. His victory over the Turks in the naval battle of Lepanto was attributed to the help of the Virgin Mary
- The first quarter (for Laimgrube) shows Saint Theobald in monastic garb before an altar; to his left stands a church. These arms go back to a chapel which was dedicated to St Theobald in 1621
- The second quarter (for Windmühle) also shows Saint Theobald, but as a bishop, with a church to his right
- The third quarter (for Magdalenengrund) shows the district's namesake Mary Magdelene kneeling before the cross
- The fourth quarter (for Gumpendorf) shows three fleurs-de-lys on a chapé ployé field. These were the arms of the Muschinger family, who were lords of Gumpendorf in the 16th century

== Sights ==
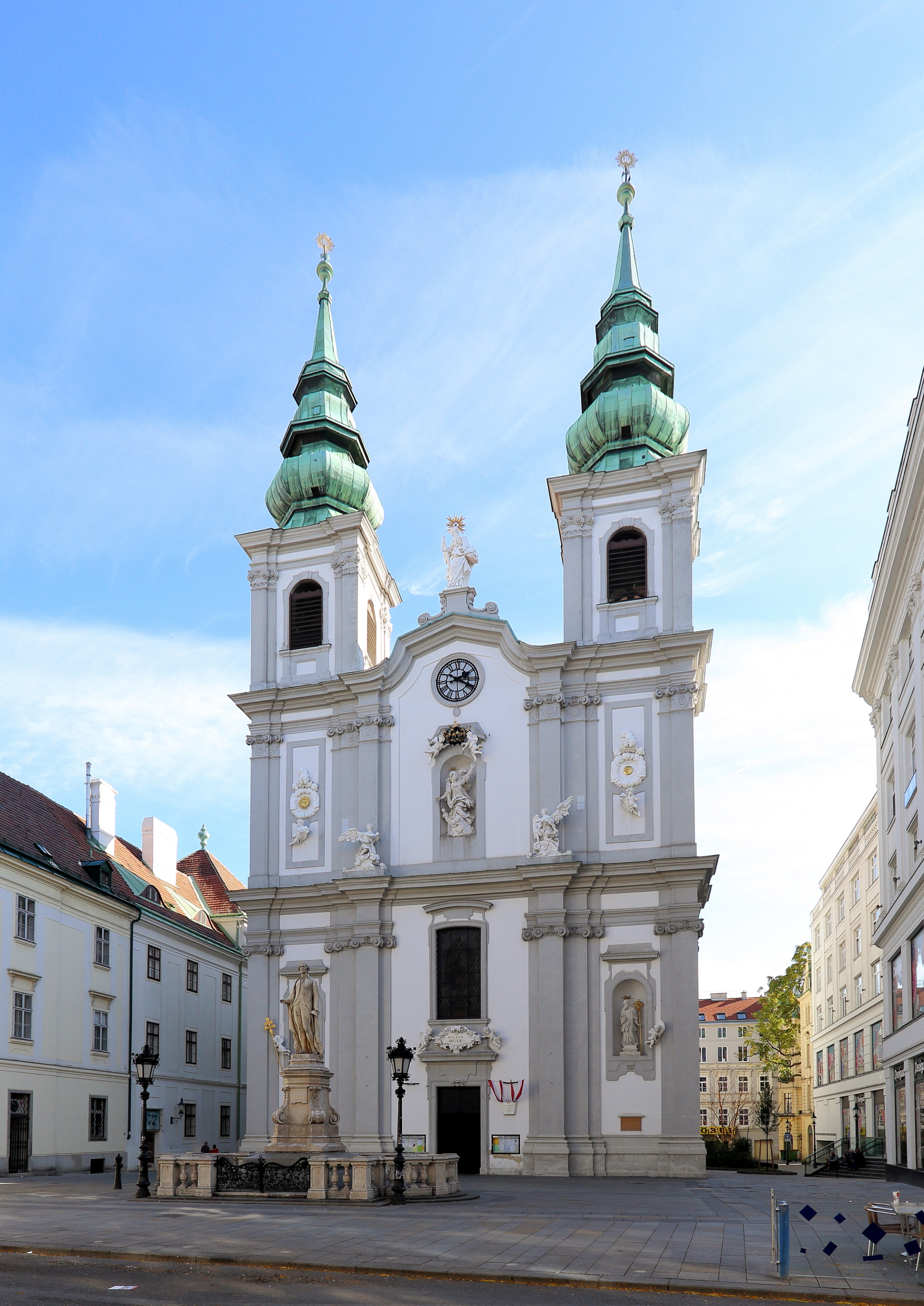
Mariahilfer Kirche (lit. 'Mariahilf church')

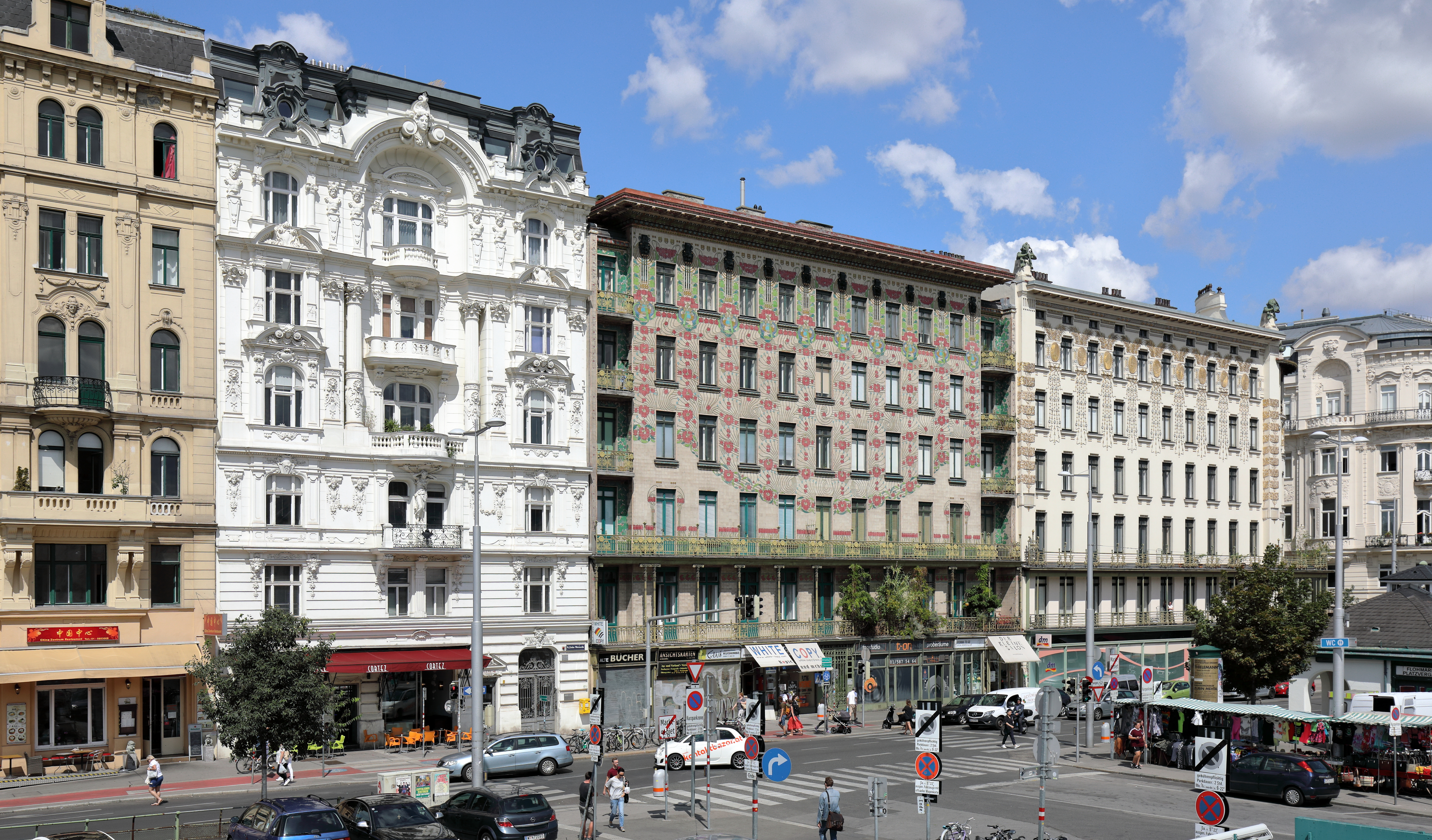
Wienzeile house of Otto Wagner.

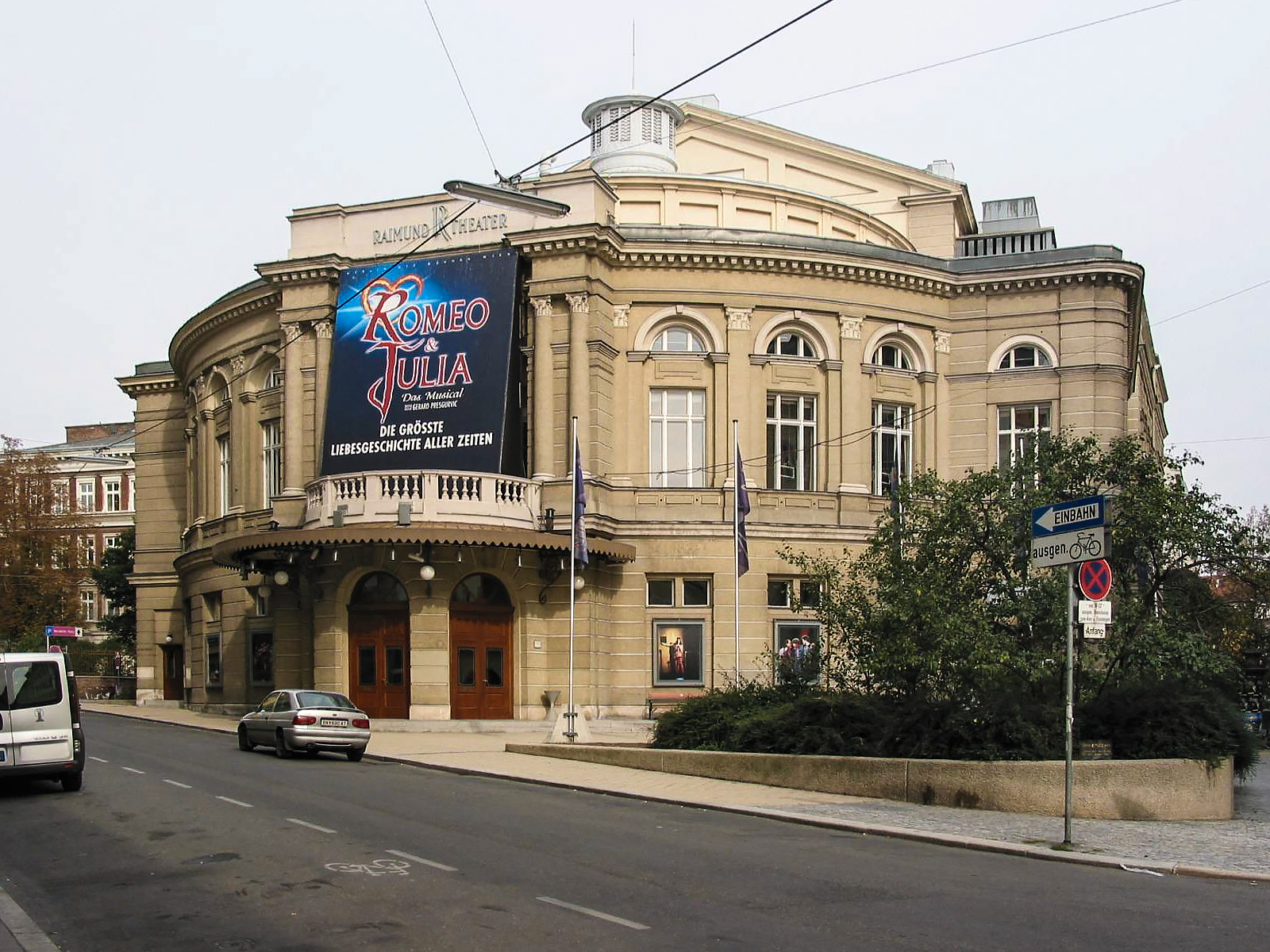
Raimund Theater

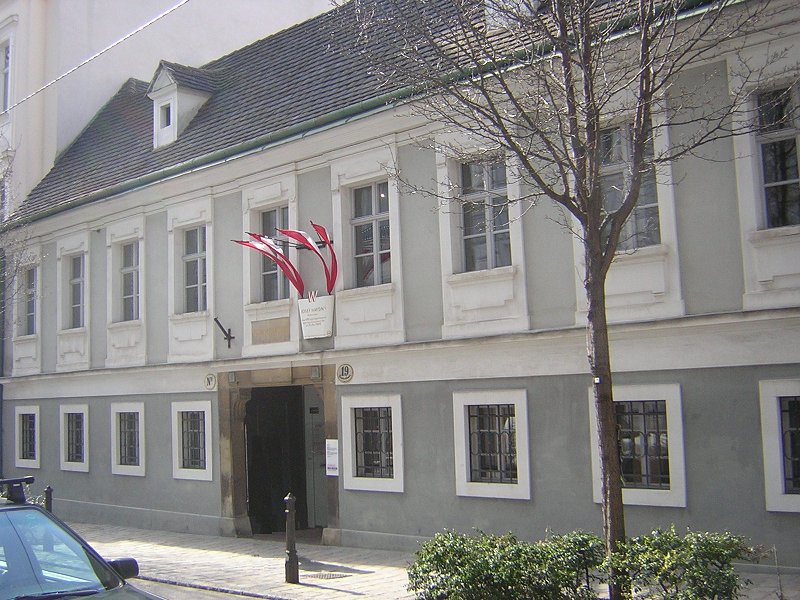
Haydnhaus

- Arik Brauer House
- Mariahilf Fire Station
- Gustav Adolf Church
- The Haus des Meeres aquarium in one of the flak towers
- Mariahilfer Kirche (church)
- Gumpendorf Church
- Naschmarkt
- Fillgraderstiege
- Rosa Lila Villa – Vienna's LGBTQ community center
- Raimundtheater
- Theater an der Wien

=== Theatres ===
Theater an der Wien, on the Linke Wienzeile, was built in 1801 and is now one of the members of the United Stages of Vienna. Ludwig van Beethoven lived between 1803 and 1804 part-time in the building, where today a memorial room is dedicated. Raimund Theater, on Wallgasse at the other end of the district, is named after Ferdinand Raimund. In the mid-1980s the theatre became part of the United Stages of Vienna, joining Theater an der Wien and Roacher, and is a venue for Broadway-scale musicals. In addition to these two stages, there are smaller theatres, like TAG (Theater an der Gumpendorferstraße), and Theater Brett.

=== Museums ===
The District Museum of Mariahilf, on Mollardgasse, is dedicated to, inter alia, focusing Ratzenstadl (Magdalenengrund), Theater an der Wien, and the Palais Kaunitz-Esterhazy. In the same house is also the Phonographic Vienna Museum, which deals with the history of the phonograph, also as the Glass Museum Mariahilf. A former flak tower is home to the Haus des Meeres ("house of the sea"), the city's aquarium whose biggest attractions at its 2007 opening included a 300,000 litre shark tank.

The Haydn-House on Haydngasse was the home of composer Joseph Haydn, acquired in 1793 and inhabited until his death in 1809. Today, the house is a branch of the Vienna Museum. Other museums in Mariahilf are the Kaffeemuseum (coffee museum) with numerous exhibits on the topic of coffee, and the Sanitärhistorische Museum (Sanitary Historical Museum).

== Notable residents ==
- Victor Adler – Austrian Social Democratic leader
- Ludwig Anzengruber – Austrian dramatist, novelist and poet
- Otto Bauer – Austrian Social Democrat
- Ludwig van Beethoven – German composer
- Robert Bleichsteiner (1891–1954) ethnologist
- Elfi von Dassanowsky – Austrian-American singer, pianist, film producer and humanitarian
- Fanny Elssler – Austrian ballerina
- Franz Joseph Haydn – composer
- Adolf Hitler – Austrian-born German politician and the leader of the Nazi Party
- Hans Krankl – Austrian former professional footballer
- Franz Lehár – composer
- Siegfried Marcus – inventor and automobile pioneer
- Carl Millöcker – Austrian composer of operettas and conductor
- Katharina Nahlik – Austrian model
- Ferdinand Raimund – actor and dramatist
- Emanuel Schikaneder – German impresario, dramatist, actor, and singer; librettist of Mozart's opera The Magic Flute and the founder of Theater an der Wien.
- August Siccard von Siccardsburg – Austrian architect, designed the Vienna State Opera
- Michael Thonet – German-Austrian cabinet maker
- Eduard van der Nüll – Austrian architect, designed the Vienna State Opera
- Oskar Werner – Austrian actor
