= Gauermann =

Gauermann is a German surname. People with that name include:

- Jakob Gauermann (1773–1843), German painter and engraver
- Friedrich Gauermann (1807–1862), son of Jakob, Austrian painter
