= Haydnpark =

Park and former cemetery in Vienna

Coordinates: 48°10′55″N 16°20′46″E

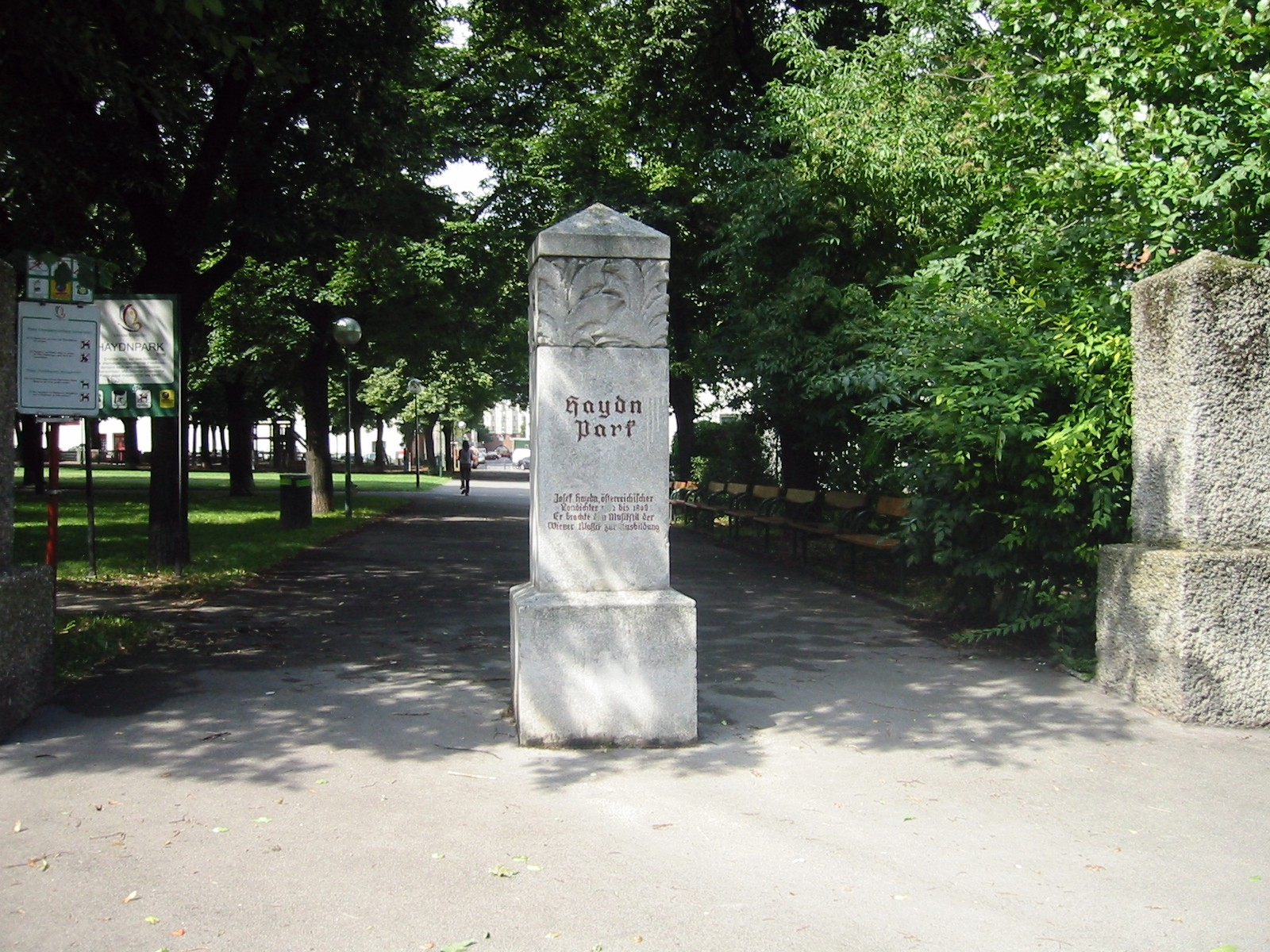
- Location: Vienna, Austria
- Area: 13,000 square metres (3.2 acres)
- Established: 1926

Haydnpark is a park in Vienna's twelfth district, Meidling. The park was built in 1926 on the remnants of an abandoned cemetery, Hundsturmer Friedhof, which closed in 1874 when the Vienna Central Cemetery was constructed. The park is named after composer Joseph Haydn, who was originally buried in the cemetery.

Today, the public park is maintained by Vienna's park management. It currently covers an area of approximately 13,000 m^{2}, and has 7,500 m^{2} of youth sports facilities for handball, volleyball, and other athletics.

== Hundsturmer Cemetery ==
Hundsturmer Cemetery

Details
- Established: 1784
- Closed: 1873
- Type: Public
- Style: Biedermeier, Empirical
- Size: 31,000 square metres (7.7 acres)

The original cemetery, Hundsturmer Friedhof, was established in 1783, as a result of Emperor Joseph II's reforms in response to the Enlightenment. Joseph II had decided that Vienna's cemeteries should no longer be within the city walls, and therefore five new cemeteries were built. Hundsturmer Friedhof, with an area of roughly 31,000 m^{2}, was the smallest of the five, the others being Sankt Marxer Friedhof, Matzleinsdorfer Friedhof, Währinger Friedhof, and Schmelzer Friedhof. The cemetery was named after the suburb in which it was founded, Hundsturm. As a result of re-zoning in the early 20th century, the park now lies within the district of Meidling rather than its namesake.

In 1848, the cemetery became a center in the battles of the Vienna Uprising because of its strategic location on Vienna's defensive line at Gürtel.

In 1926, a large new residential building, Reumannhof, was erected and the old cemetery was converted into a recreational park. A children's pool was also constructed at the time, which no longer exists.

== Famous memorials ==
The biedermeier style was distinctive of the headstones and memorials at Hundsturmer Friedhof. Empirical style gravestones and stone angels have been found, along with many graves from senior citizens.

Joseph Haydn, after whom the park is named, died on 31 May 1809, and was buried in the cemetery the very next day. It was not possible to give Haydn a grandiose burial, as French troops under Napoleon's command had occupied Vienna at the time. Haydn was later exhumed and transferred to Eisenstadt in 1820. It was discovered that his skull was missing, which had been stolen from the grave shortly after his funeral by followers of Phrenology. The partially preserved headstone of Joseph Haydn is the only one that remains in the park today and stands as evidence of the former cemetery. It is inscribed with the phrase Non omnis moriar ("I do not die completely").

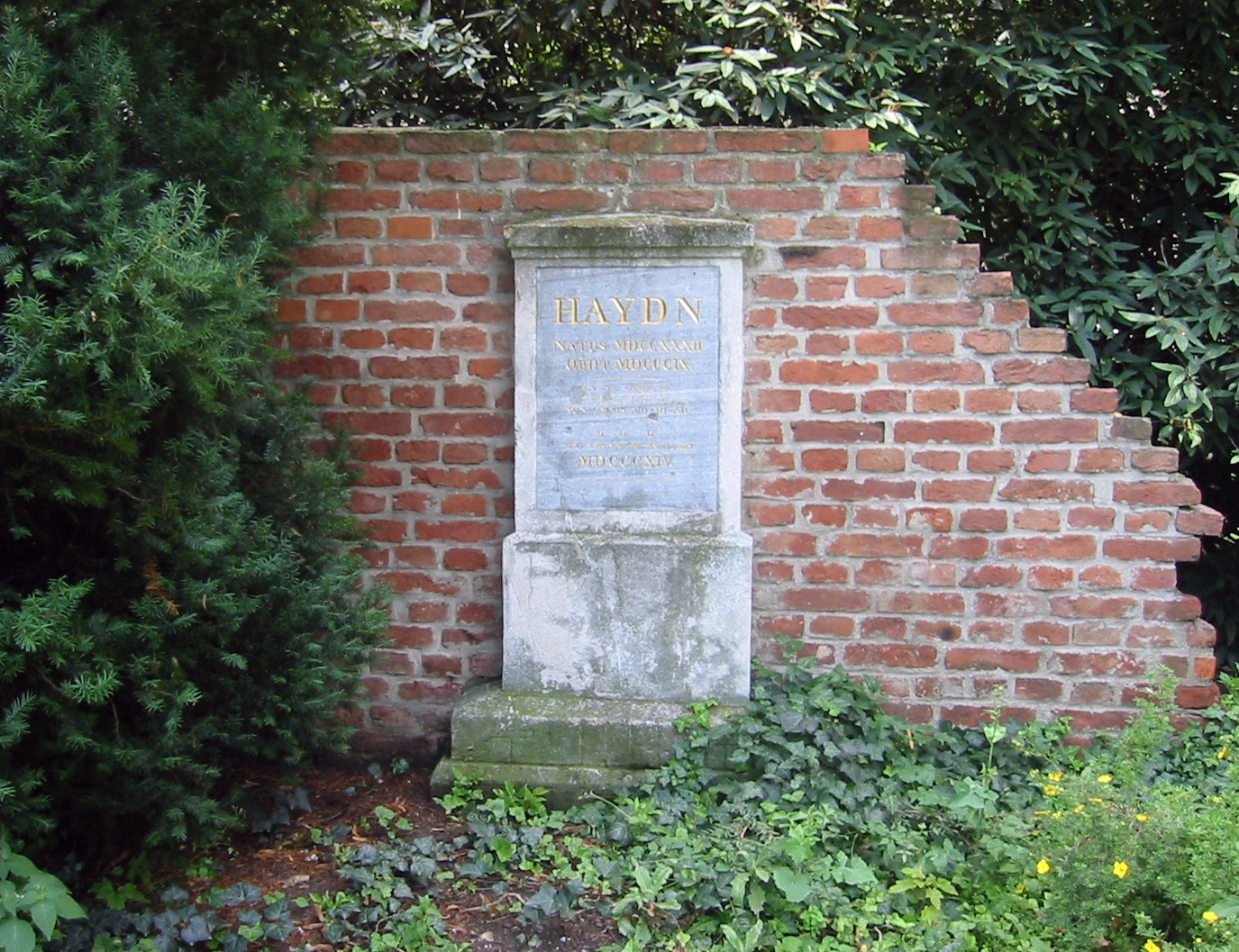
Joseph Haydn Memorial

The famous painters Jakob Gauermann and Josef Danhauser were also buried at Hundsturmer. They were later transferred to an honorary grave at the Vienna Central Cemetery.

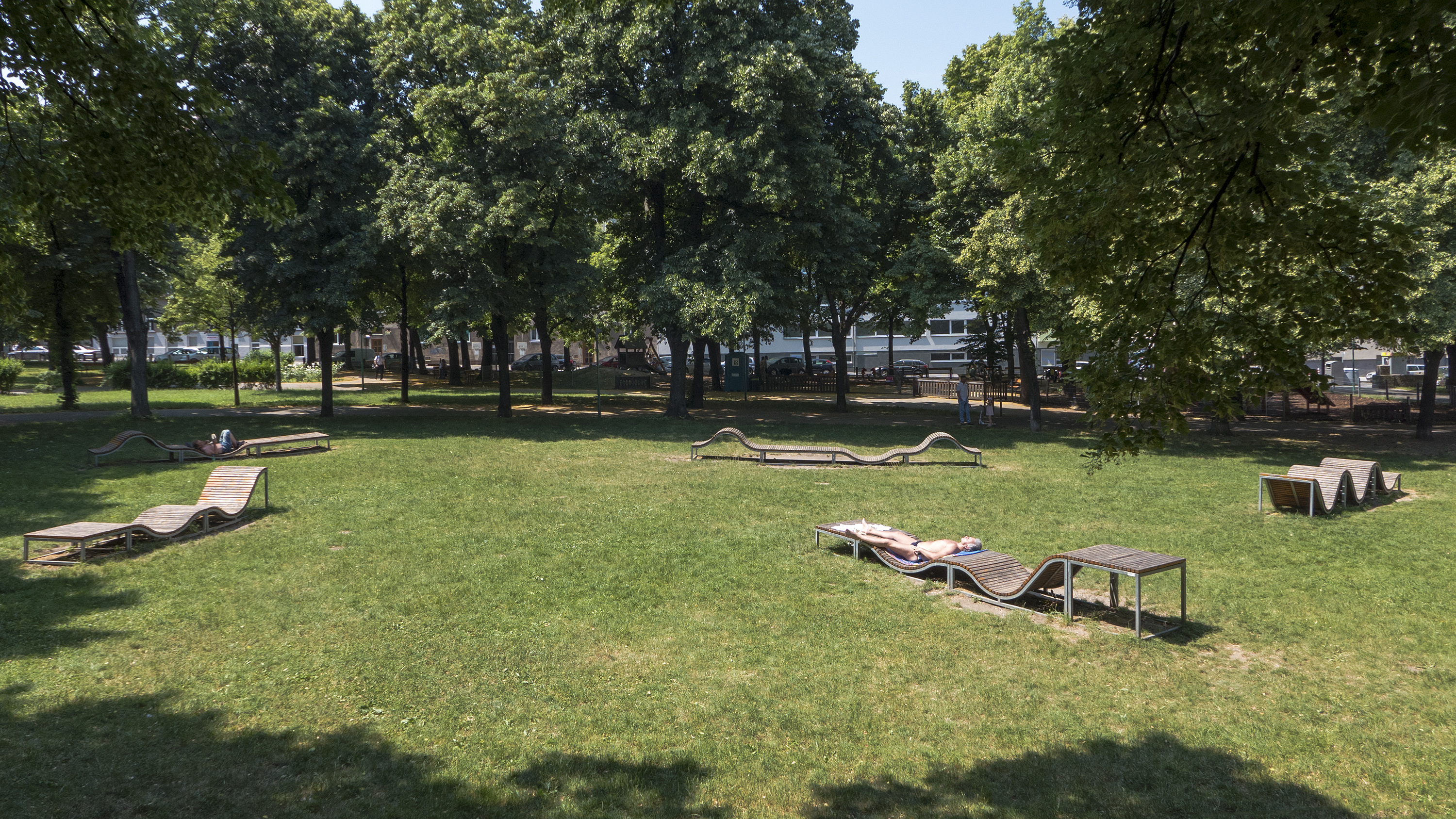

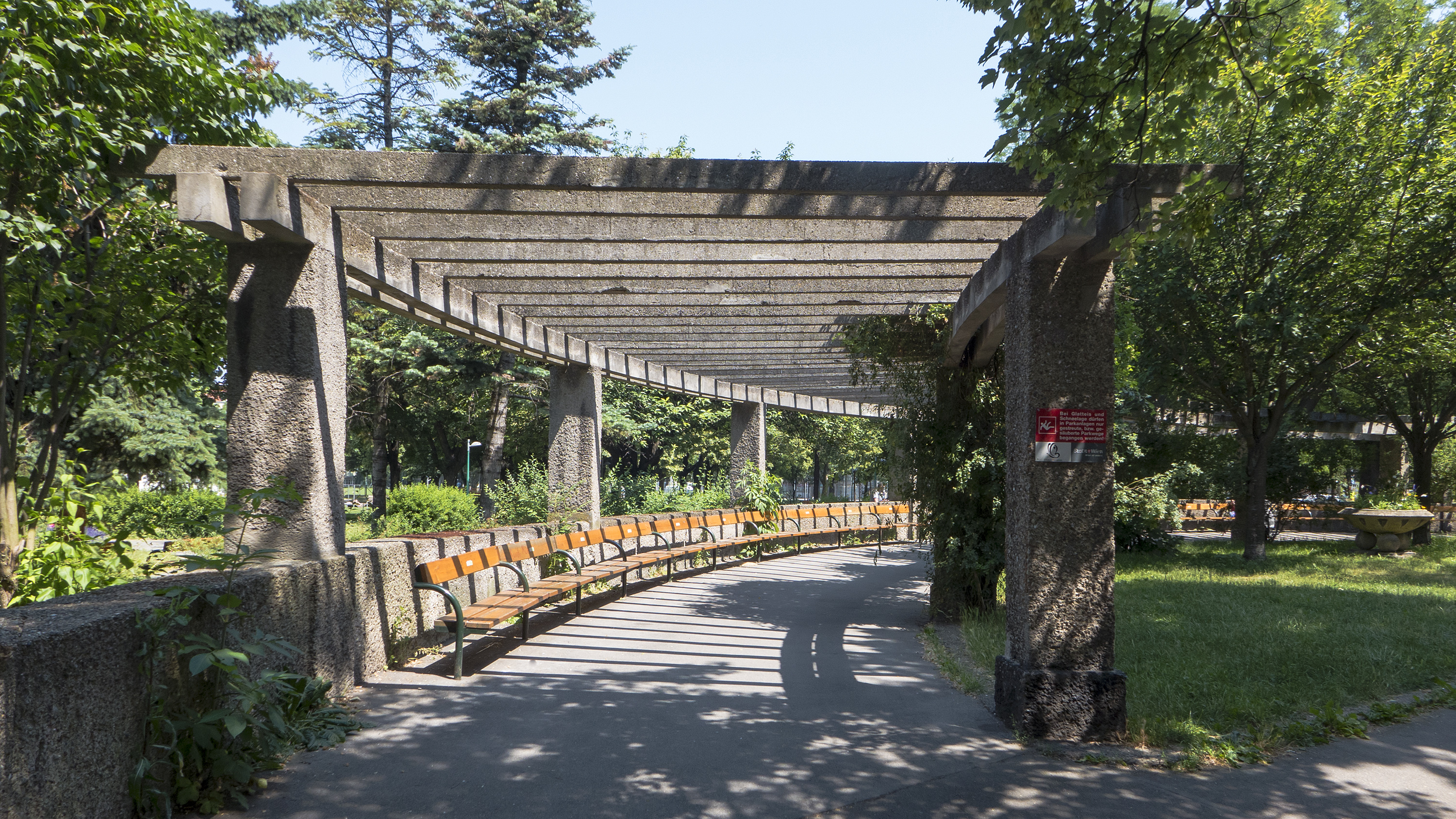

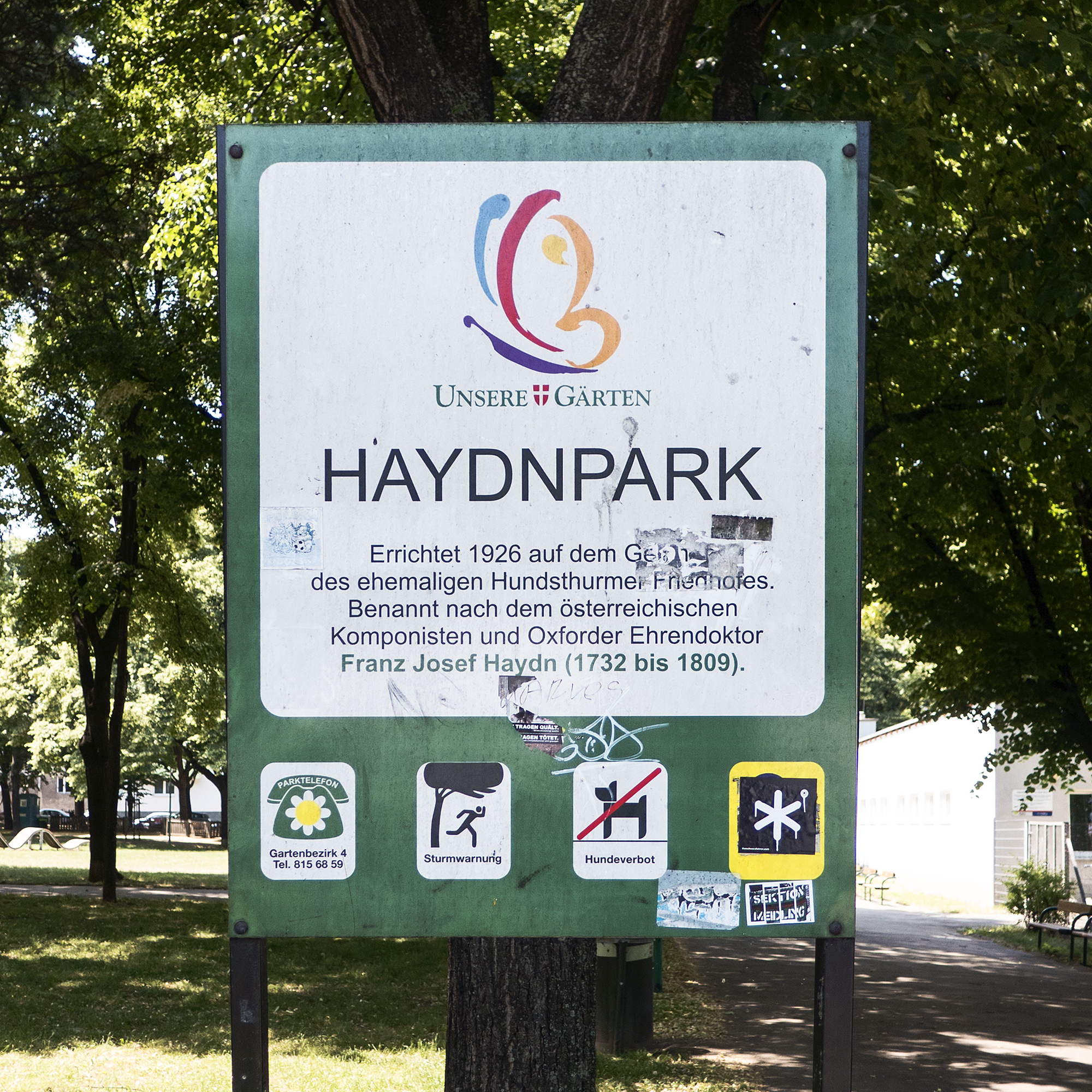

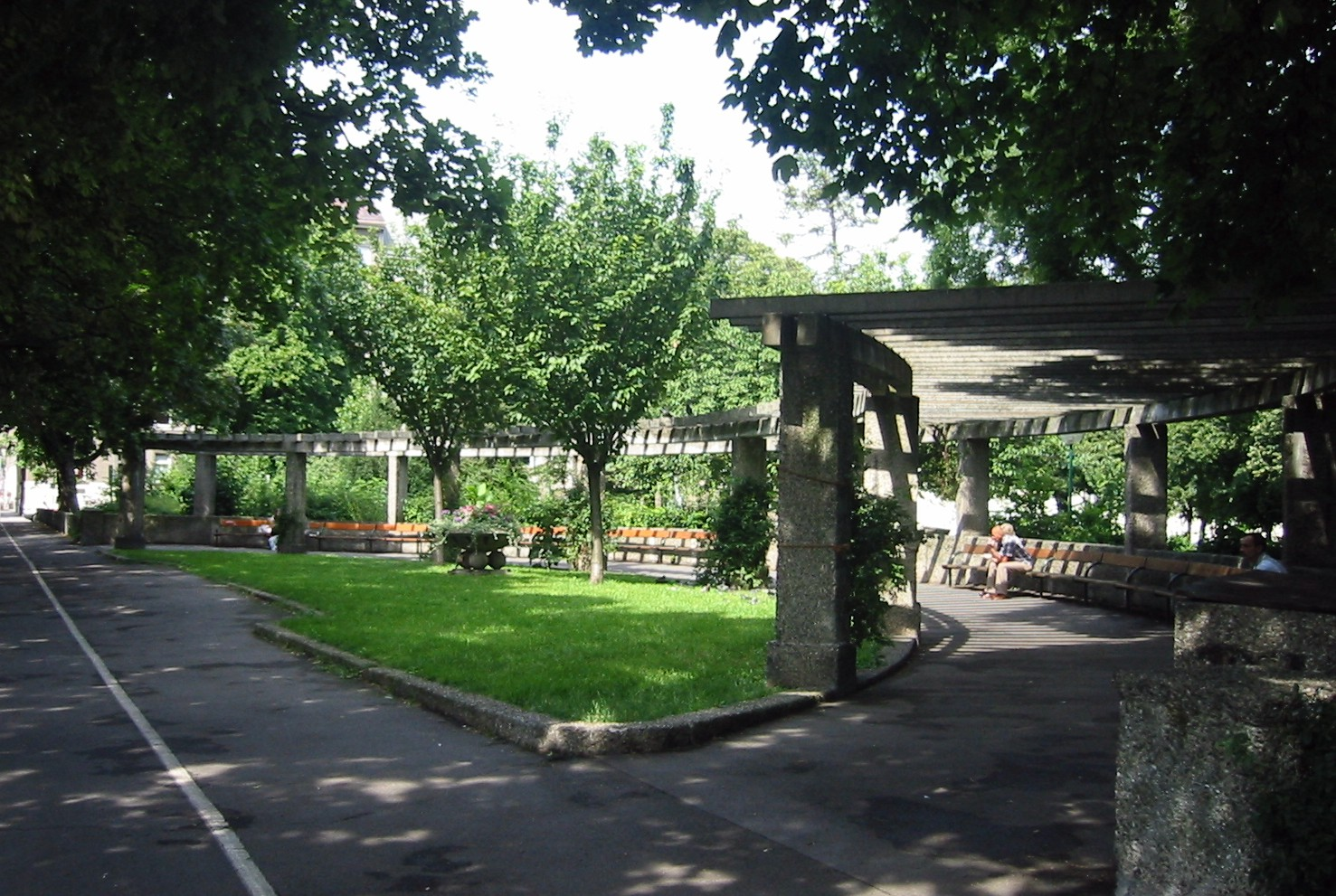
