= Margareten =

Coordinates: 48°11′14″N 16°21′11″E

Margareten Magredn (Bavarian)
- 5th District of Vienna
- Coat of arms

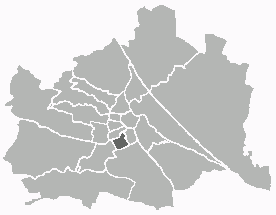
- Location of the district within Vienna
- Country: Austria
- City: Vienna

Government
  - District Director: Michael Luxenberger Greens
  - Second Deputy: Thomas Kerekes (Green)
  - Representation (40 Members): Greens 14, SPÖ 13; FPÖ 5, NEOS 3 KPÖ 3, ÖVP 2

Area
  - Total: 2.03 km^{2} (0.78 sq mi)

Population (2025-01-01)
  - Total: 54,581
  - Density: 26,900/km^{2} (69,600/sq mi)
- Postal code: A-1050
- Address of District Office: Schönbrunner Straße 54; A-1050 Wien
- Website: www.wien.gv.at/bezirke/margareten/

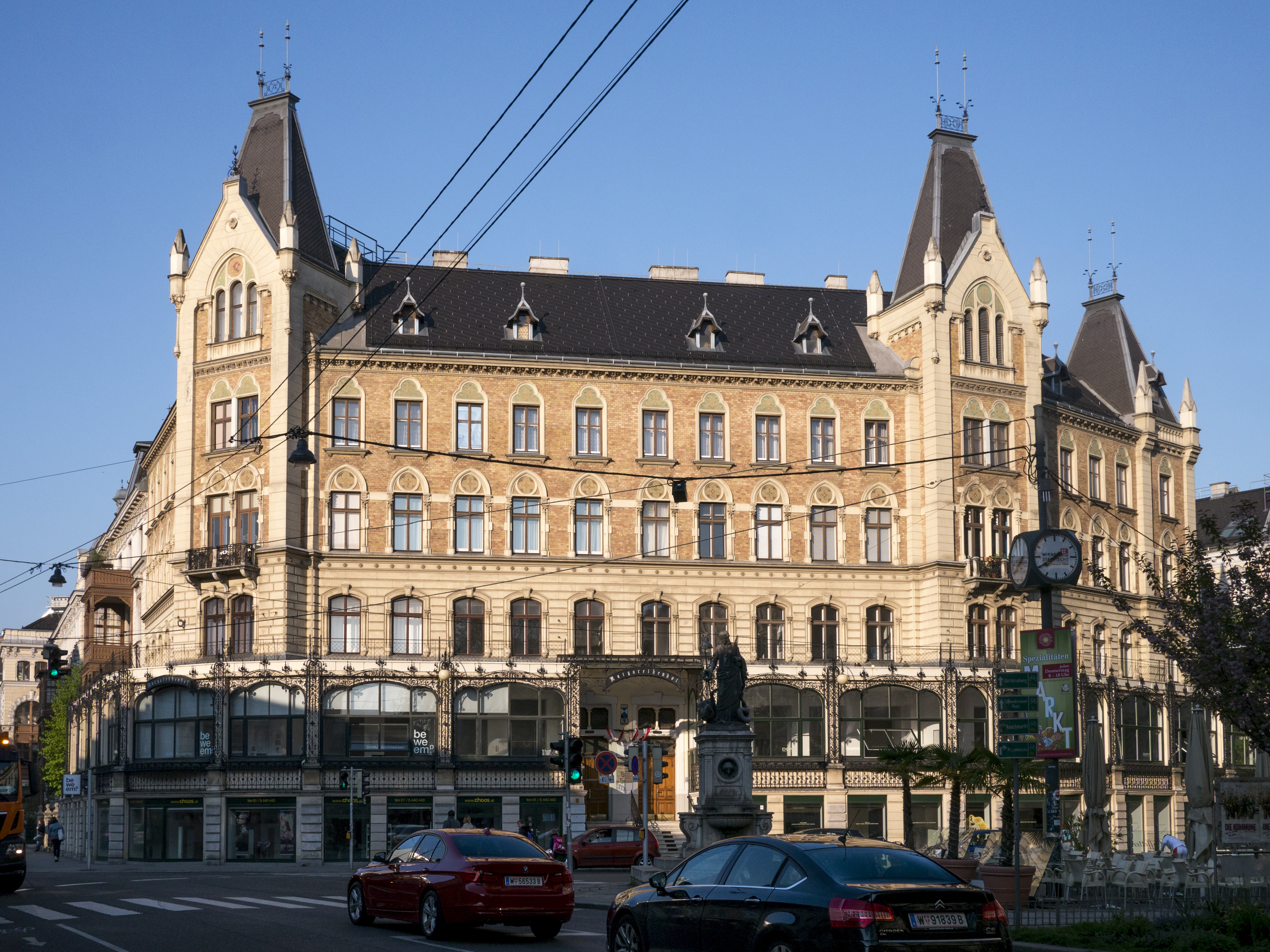
Margeretenhof-Brunnen

Margareten (German pronunciation: [ˌmaʁɡaˈʁeːtn̩]; Viennese: Magredn) is the fifth district of Vienna (German: 5. Bezirk, Margareten). It is near the old town of Vienna and was separated from the fourth district in 1861. Margareten is a residential urban area, with over 25,000 inhabitants per km^{2}, one of the most densely populated districts in Vienna. The district is named after Margaret of Antioch.

== Description ==
The district of Margareten was formed from six suburbs. The former city of Margareten itself developed from an estate with the same name and was later built into a castle. It was destroyed in both Turkish sieges of Vienna, but rebuilt each time. Nearby lay Nikolsdorf, which was systemically laid out in the period 1555-1568 and named after the convent of St. Nikolai. Matzleinsdorf emerged in 1130 and was property of the Babenberger family. The name Laurenzergrund ("St. Lawrence ground") comes from an area in Matzleindorf with the Laurenzer gully. After the closing of the convent by Emperor Joseph II, it became an independent city.

Reinprechtsdorf was a village in the Middle Ages, abandoned earlier, but the name remained as a path waypoint. In 1730, residential houses were again built in the area. Nearby, a hunting lodge was built, wherefrom the suburb Hundsturm ("Hounds tower") gets its name. The hunting lodge was later replaced with a fort, which was taken down by 1885.

Those six areas, along with a number of others, were incorporated on 5 March 1850 into the fourth district of Wieden. After a long debate over the different social circumstances of the population, in 1861 the fifth district was separated. In 1873 the district lost its southern area to the, much larger, 10th district, Favoriten. Since then, the formerly rural district has become a thickly populated urban area with many workers and eventually large residential homes.

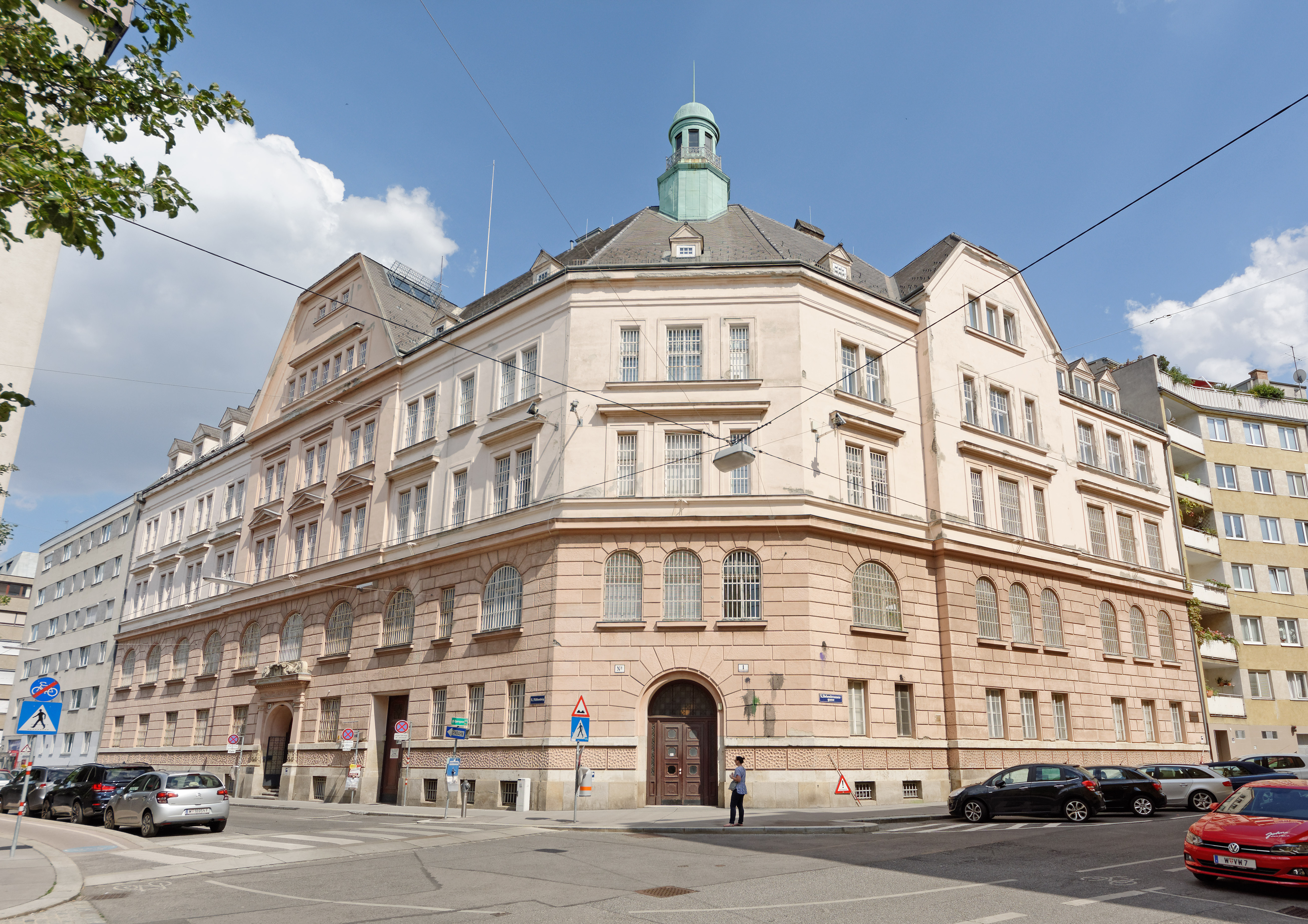
Special prison "Mittersteig" at Margareten

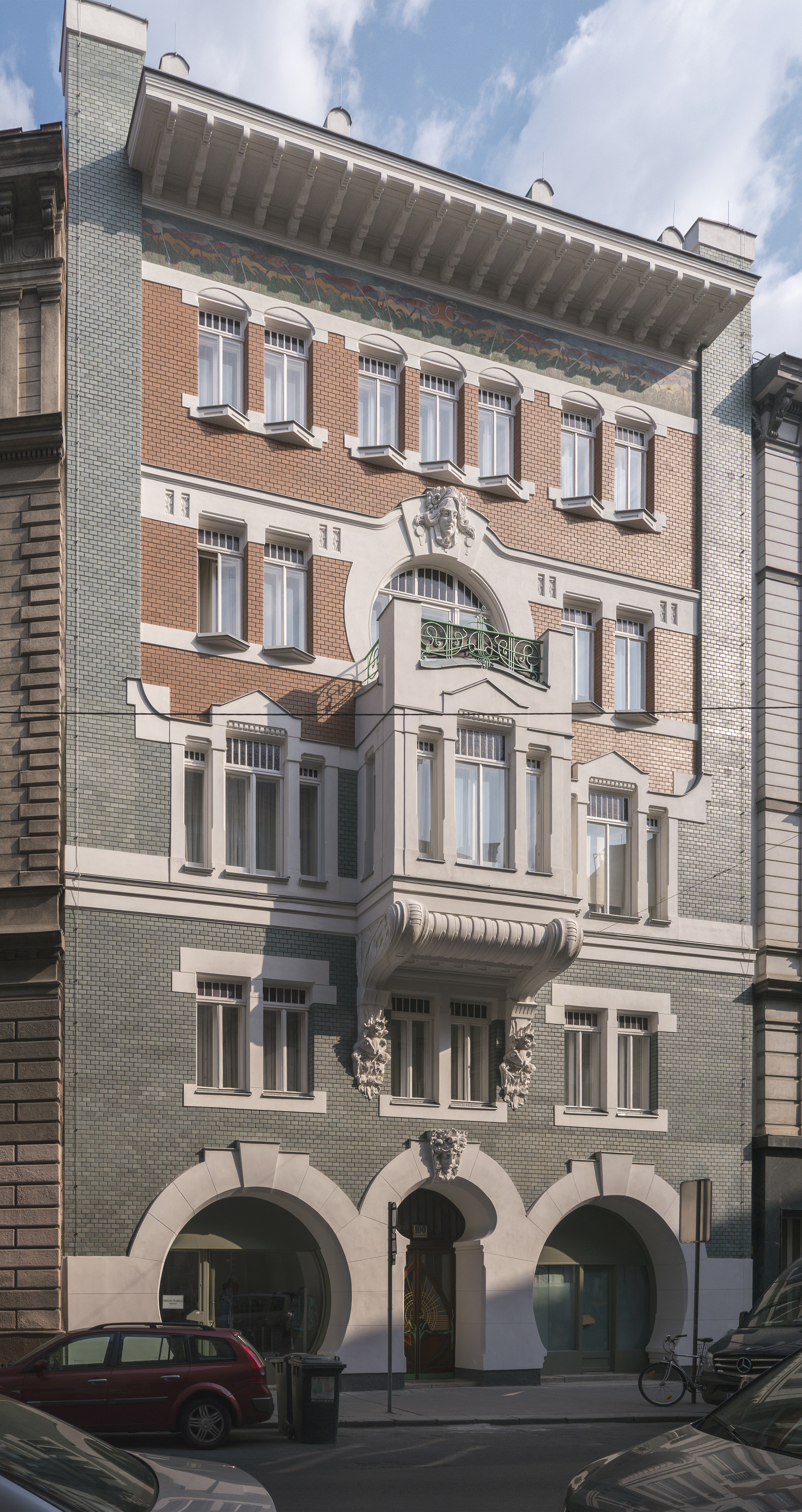
Miethaus at Margaretenstraße 100

== Geography ==
=== Location ===
Margareten is in the southwest of Vienna and is bounded to the north by the Vienna River, in the west and south by the Gürtel belt. The Vienna River is also the border to the district Mariahilf, while the belt is the boundary of the districts Favoriten and Meidling. The eastern district boundary with Wieden runs contrary to the other inner districts in the transverse rather than longitudinal. Thus, the district boundary follows the streets: Kettenbrückengasse, Margaretenstraße, Kleine Neugasse, Mittersteig, Ziegelofengasse, Blechturmgasse until the Gürtel belt. Margareten is the only district within the Vienna Belt which is not within the Inner City borders.
The district area is part of the Katastralgemeinde Margareten, which has a hectare of the territory of the neighboring district Mariahilf. The lowest point in Margareten is nearly 174 metres (571 ft) in the Wiental. In the south (at Wienerberg hill), the land rises slightly. Margareten has no sharp altitudes, or mountains: the total height difference is approximately 30 metres (98 ft).

=== Land Use ===
The developed area of Margareten is 63.8% (Vienna citywide 33.32%), with around 82% accounted for by residential area. With 31.7%, the traffic area takes the second highest percentage of the district area (for Vienna citywide traffic is only 13.75%). The green spaces cover only 4.54% of the district area (for Vienna citywide: 48.26%), while 91.54% will be used for parks. Courtyards, individual trees, groups of trees, and green plants are the largest in percentage share of green areas, in addition to the approximately 80 rooftop gardens to count. Only three other districts (Neubau, Mariahilf and Josefstadt) have even less green space than Margareten, which since 2000, has doubled the proportion of green space. Superficial waters, forests, small gardens or agricultural areas are absent from Margareten.

Space allocation in 2003
Builtspace			Greenspace						Water	Transport areas
129.63			9.22						0	64.45
Housing	Oper- ations	Public Facilities	Farms	Parks	Forests	Meadows	Small gardens	Rec. areas		
106.11	14.82	7.75	0	8.44	0	0.42	0	0.35		

=== Rivers and springs ===
In the seven wells area of Oberreinprechtsdorf, arise many springs. In 1562, the Imperial Court finally got its own first water supply by the Siebenbrunner Hofwasserleitung, which was commissioned and built by Holy Roman Emperor Ferdinand I. The water was collected in seven wells and run through cast-iron pipes to a reservoir under the Augustinian bastion in Vienna, from where it was piped into the Hofburg Palace. By Margareten Fountain at Margareten Square, the Emperor permitted from 1829, the citizens to use the Hofwasserleitung. Today, the seven wells are shown through the Siebenbrunnen at Siebenbrunnenplatz.

=== Geology ===
Margareten mainly consists of Pleistocene terrace pebbles, from the period between 1.75 million years ago and 11,500 years ago (in the course of the Ice Age). The district lies largely on the Wienerberg terrace, which originated in the Beestonian stage. In the area of the Vienna River, there are also loess, and loess loam soils, particularly in the part of Margareten. Near the river there are extant Vienna deposits (Grobklastika), which have a small size and thickness. Due to origin from the Flyschzone, they are made of clay or sandstone plates and therefore, have little relevance to the groundwater in the city.

=== Climate ===
In Margareten, there is no official weather station with long-term metrics. Its proximity to the Inner City and similar areas with a high concentration of buildings and roads, and a small amount of green space, the official ZAMG weather are used inside the city for the climate data in Margareten.
As in Vienna, the climate in Margareten has oceanic influences from the West and continental influences from the east. Margareten's climate is typically of lower precipitation, little snow, many cloudy, moderately cold days in winter, sunny and hot days in summer. The winters are mild, compared to the suburbs (outside of the Gürtel belt, on average up to 2 °C (35 °F). The average air temperature during the years 1971 to 2000 was 11.4 °C (53 °F). The average annual precipitation is around 548 mm (21.6 inches). There are: 50.4 frost days and 18.6 ice days, 67.6 summer and 17.9 hot days. Margareten has had 1883.6 hours of sunshine that are incurred, while in December only 50.6 hours of sunshine, but in July, however, 260.4 hours of sunshine. The wind usually comes from the west or northwest.

== History ==
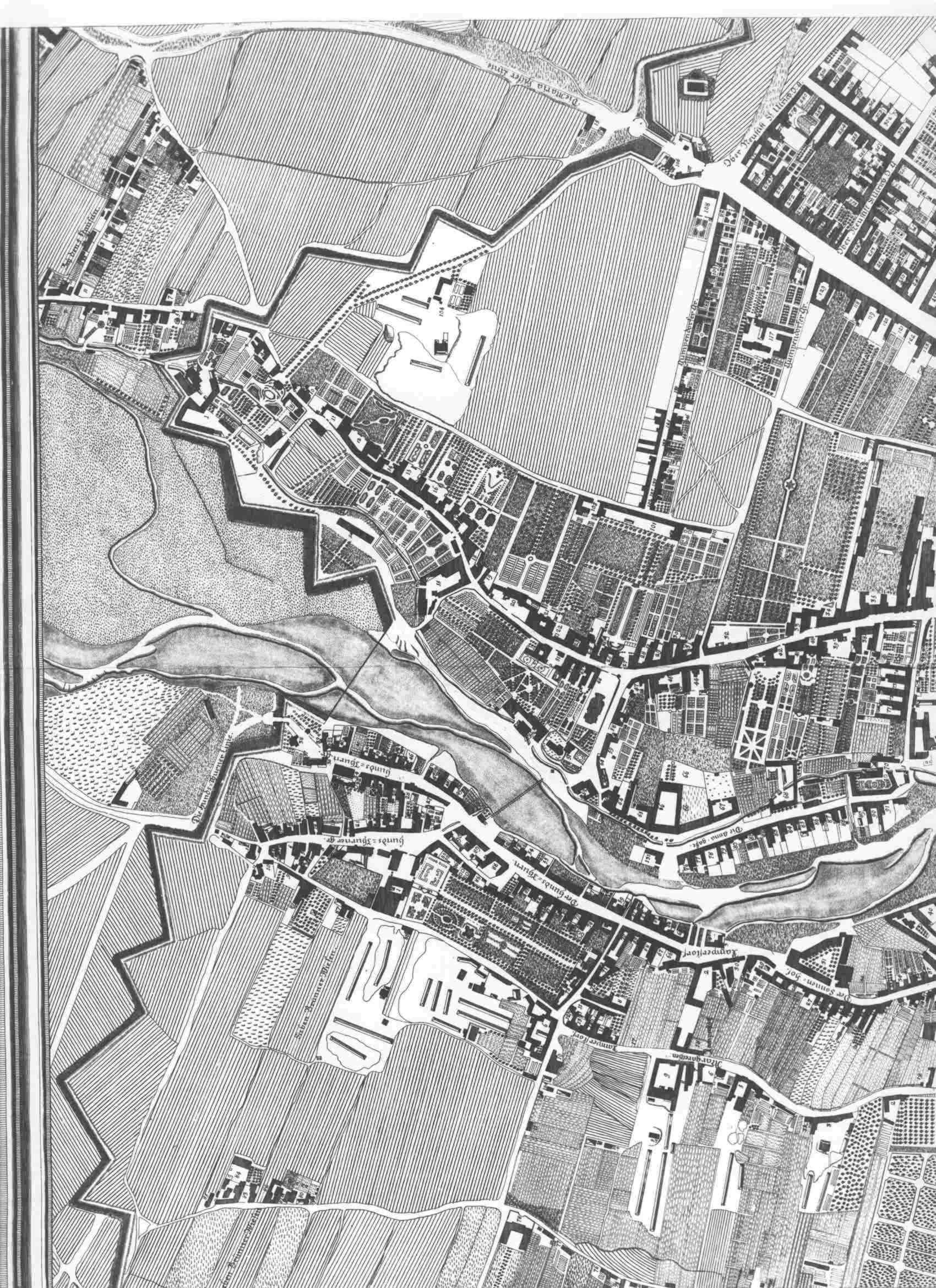
Hundsturm with the Linien wall.

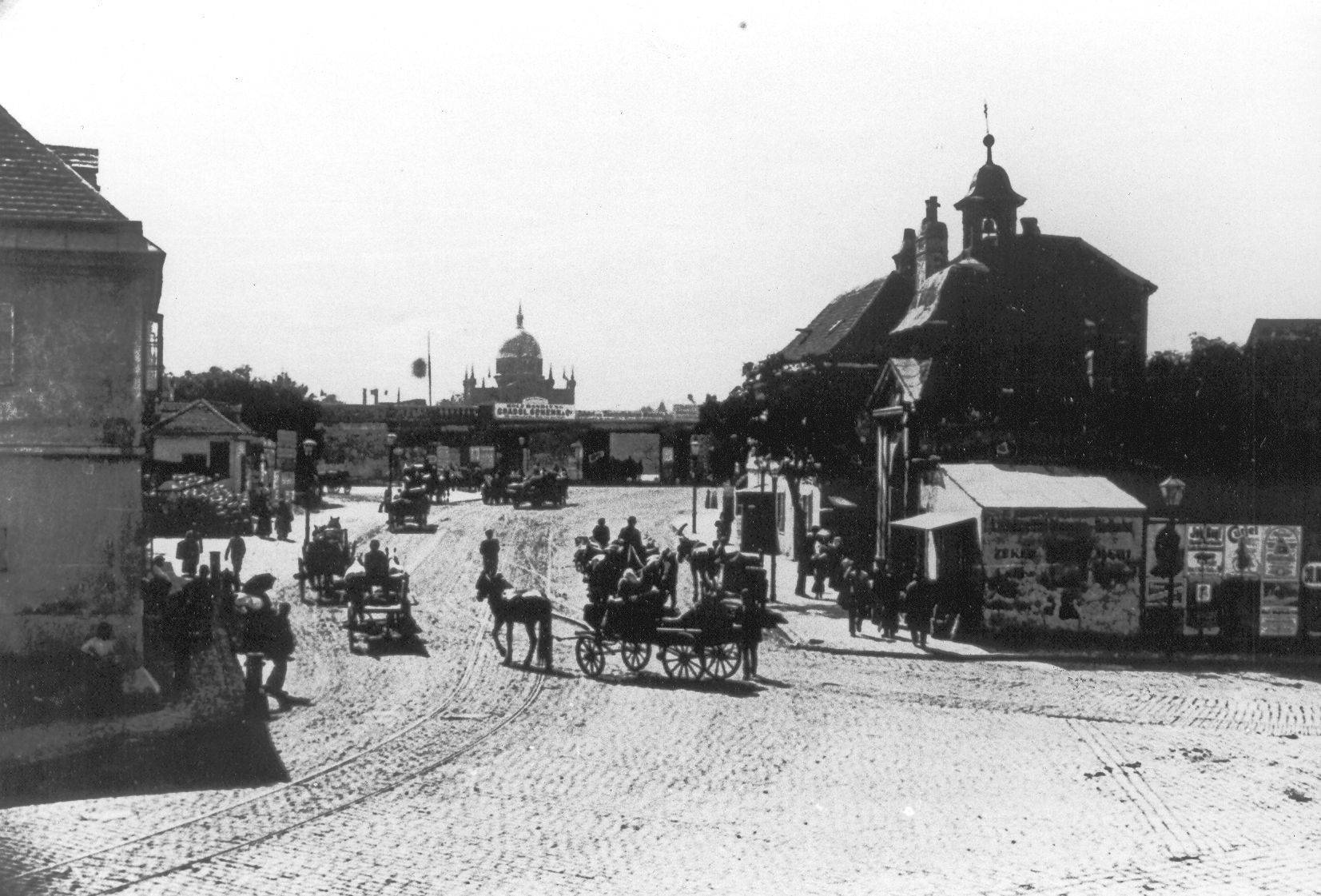
Matzleinsdorfer Square with the south rail in Richtung Favoriten

=== The suburbs before 1850 ===
The current District of Margareten included, in the time before 1850, several independent suburbs. The history of the various suburbs by 1850 can be found on the respective entries (below).

For following former suburbs of the district formed Margareten:

- Hundsturm
- Hungelbrunn (some of it is in District Wieden)
- Laurenzergrund
- Margareten
- Matzleinsdorf
- Nikolsdorf
- Reinprechtsdorf

=== Margareten joins the Fifth District ===
All suburbs of the current Margareten District, along with many nearby, were incorporated on 6 March 1850 as the 4th District Wieden. After lengthy debate, the current 5th District was cut from that in 1861, because of the different conditions within the district. The reason was that the then great expansion of the district Wieden had economically disabled the administration. Moreover, the possibility of facilitating the monitoring and awareness of historically evolved social, economic and structural differences, also helped to change the district division from the year 1850, in line with the existing police districts of Wieden and Margareten.

Thus, the then 4th District has been separated in the transverse direction. The district boundary was then defined as follows: Kettenbrückengasse, today's Margaret Street, Little Neugasse, Mittersteig, Ziegelofengasse, Blechturmgasse, on the Linienwall (now Vienna Belt) for Matzleinsdorfer Catholic Cemetery (now Waldmüllerpark), along the Laxenburger Street by Wienerberg hill. This boundary line separated the citizens of the 4th district Wieden, with approximately 55,000 residents, from the 5th district (Margareten district) with about 32,000 residents.

In 1874, Margareten lost the entire section at the south part of the Vienna Belt (e.g., Protestant Cemetery Matzleinsdorf) to the 10th District Favoriten. In 1907, Margareten reduced by the cession of the west, outside of the belt part of the former suburban Hundsturm ("Neumargareten" including Hundsturm Cemetery), to the 12th District Meidling, its surface area to the present size.

=== The time until World War I ===
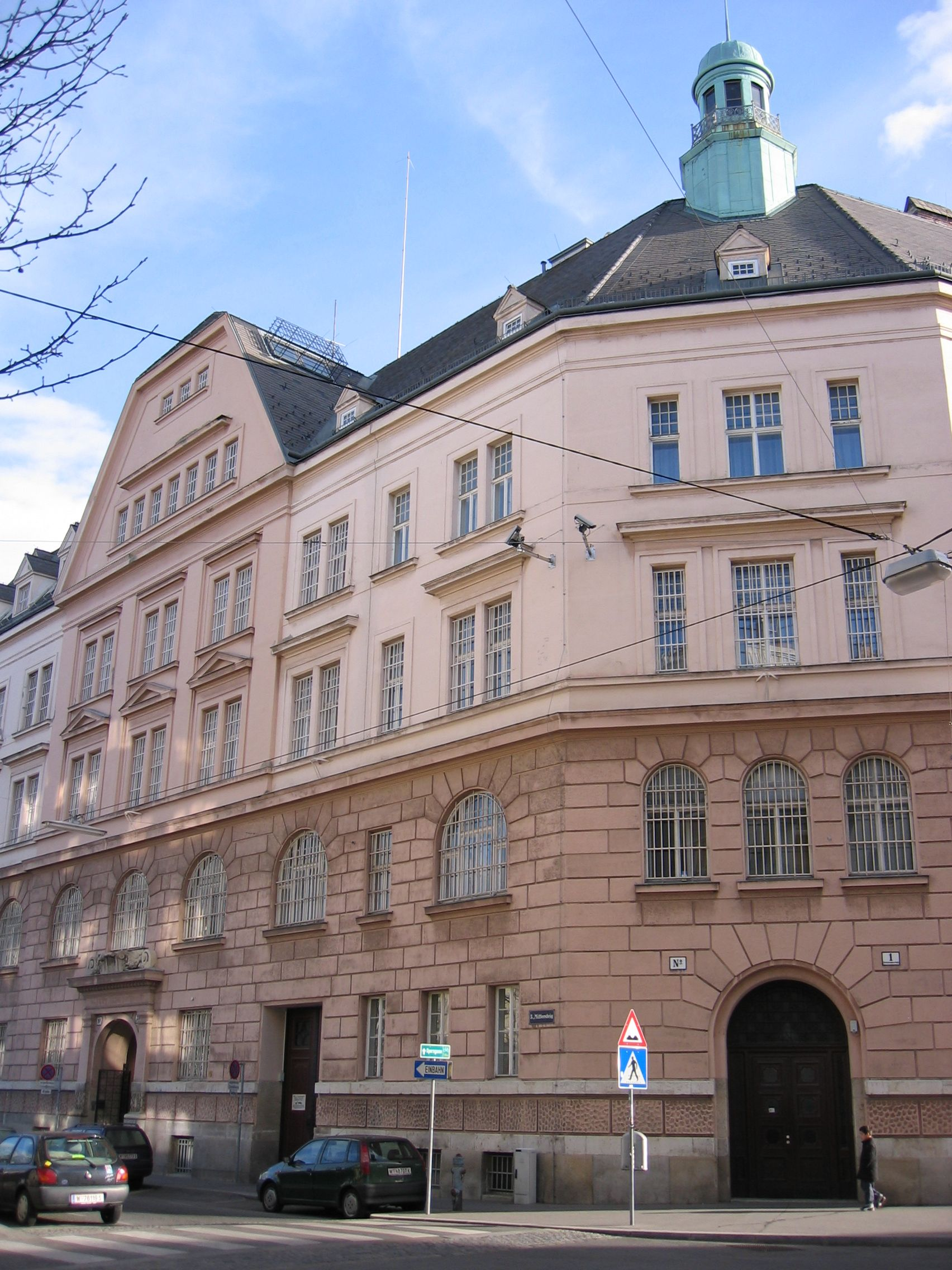
Prison Mittersteig

The 5th District appeared at its inception as still predominantly rural in character, especially against the Liner Wall, where there were numerous parks, gardens, meadows, fields and vegetable fields. The area southwest of the district could not be built until 1870, when the seven sources since 1562 served as the Vienna's water supply Hofwasserleitung. The space was sparsely populated between the current Margaret Street and Siebenbrunnengasse. The Reinprechtsdorferstraße street was then installed only in its lower course. Most existing streets still ended up as deadends.

Margareten was originally an artisan district, which developed in the 19th century, by the growing population, into a working-class district. With increasing industrialization, until the turn of the century in many ways, the shift came from rural or suburban areas to more a densely built-up urban area. In 1869, in 921 houses lived around 54,000 inhabitants. Up to 1900, the number of houses rose to 1579 and the number of dwellings was approximately 25,300. Margareten lived in the century about 107,000 inhabitants. The biggest problem in Margareten presented the unfavorable living conditions. An average apartment, of room and kitchen, was home to more than four people. Between 1860 and 1912, in the district some major institutions were created: an orphanage (1864), an Almshouse and Hartmannspital (1865). The new administration building in the Schönbrunnerstraße 54 was obtained in 1867 and opened in 1872, with the Margaretenbad. In 1877, the oldest Volksbildungsverein of Vienna (today: VHS polycollege) was founded, and in 1909 to 1911 the house in the Stöbergasse 11-15 was included. The gaslight came relatively late, installed in 1899, and in 1911, the Vienna River was vaulted (enclosed). In the vicinity of the Naschmarkt in 1902, Rüdigerhof was built by the architect Oskar Marmorek. Between 1907 and 1908, the association Beth Aharon established a synagogue at Siebenbrunnengasse 1a, which was destroyed during the November Pogrom (1938). The Mittersteig Prison (Justizanstalt Mittersteig) was built from 1908 to 1910 next to the synagogue, whose first director was Willibald Sluga. Currently (2008) this institution serves in the heart of Vienna for law enforcement, with over 55 prison officers/officials.

Transportation in the district was opened in 1877 by a horse-tram line (Pferdetramwaylinie). In the following years, further tram lines were added and subsequently changed in 1902 to electric operation. Following the establishment of the Vienna tram, at the end of the 19th century, the line was canceled and the Wall Gürtel belt created. This connection was given to Margareten Wientallinie of the Vienna tram (now Subway Line 4 (Vienna) U4). In the 19th century, Vienna General Omnibus AG began, a bus line operated with horses after Matzleinsdorf. For over 100 years, the Vienna belt-Baden ran through Margareten and built to operate the station Wolfganggasse Vienna to the then district area (now Meidling).

=== Interwar period until 1945 ===
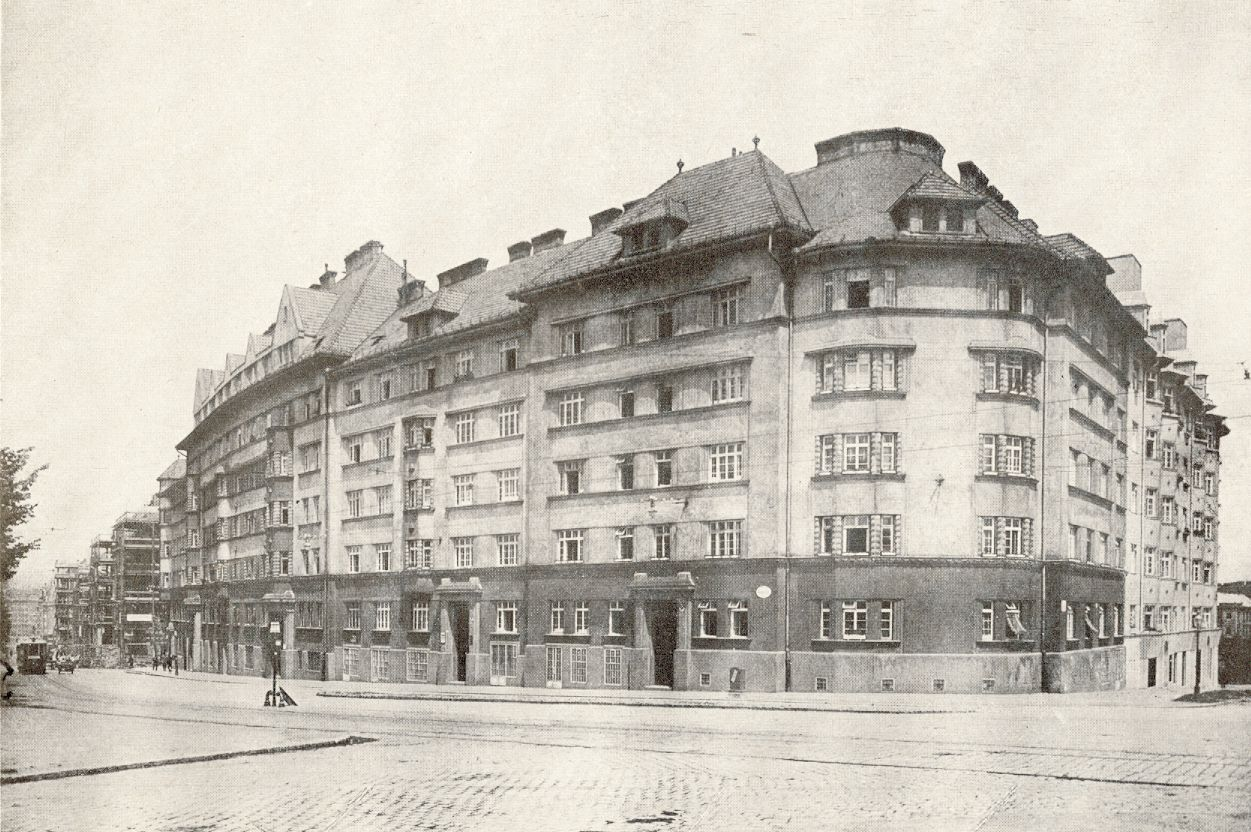
Metzleinstaler court around 1922

Although the population declined in Margaret, the pent-up demand for housing was relatively large. The number of houses rose during 1910–1923, from 1563 to 1626 houses, and remained with 1618 houses in 1934 almost the same count, despite strong local construction activity. This had two reasons: first, major developments have been built, and secondly, the houses were built higher and the number of four-and five-storey homes increased. To alleviate the large housing shortage after the First World War, communal housing was created in Vienna. The free area in Margareten - along the "belt Drasche" - offered the ability to reach large communal dwellings. The result was in 1919–1920, as the Metzleinstaler Court, the first residential building of the municipality of Vienna, with 244 apartments. By 1930, five other large residential buildings were erected, so that the belt had the colloquial name "Ring of the proletariat". During the Austrian Civil War in 1934, the workers' district offered resistance against the Austro-fascist corporate state. The Reumannhof, a municipal building dating from 1924, had a central function as a main base of the Republic Protection League, the paramilitary arm of the Social Democratic Party of Austria, and was held by the League for a long time. On 12 February 1934, fighting broke out at the Reumannhof at around 2 p.m. and ended when the general strike collapsed at 8 p.m. The entrenched Protection League members then surrendered.

The Margaret synagogue, located in the Siebenbrunnengasse 1a, was destroyed during the November pogrom (1938), Kristallnacht. During World War II, large parts of Margareten were destroyed by bombing raids since the war effort ran institutions, such as the Austrian Southern Railway and the freight station Matzleinsdorf, at the county line. Also heavily damaged was the area around the Vienna River.

In the liberation of Vienna by the Red Army, troops remained in the area occupied by the Volkssturm and SS Amtshaus from the fighting since the Volkssturm units during an air raid in the flight taken. On 10 April 1945 the Soviet army arrived in Margareten and installed in the Upper Amtshausgasse 3-5 (former employment), the Russian commander. Nevertheless, the majority of the roads after the war were impassable, and there was neither light nor gas. The public transport was decommissioned, and the parks were used as dumping sites for debris and garbage. Homelessness, disease, hunger and chaos dominated the immediate postwar period.

=== Since World War II ===
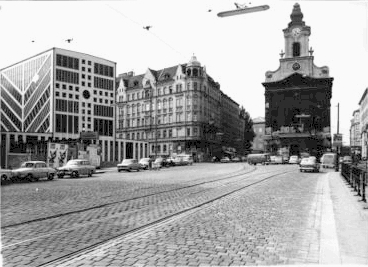
Old and New Florianikirche churches in 1965

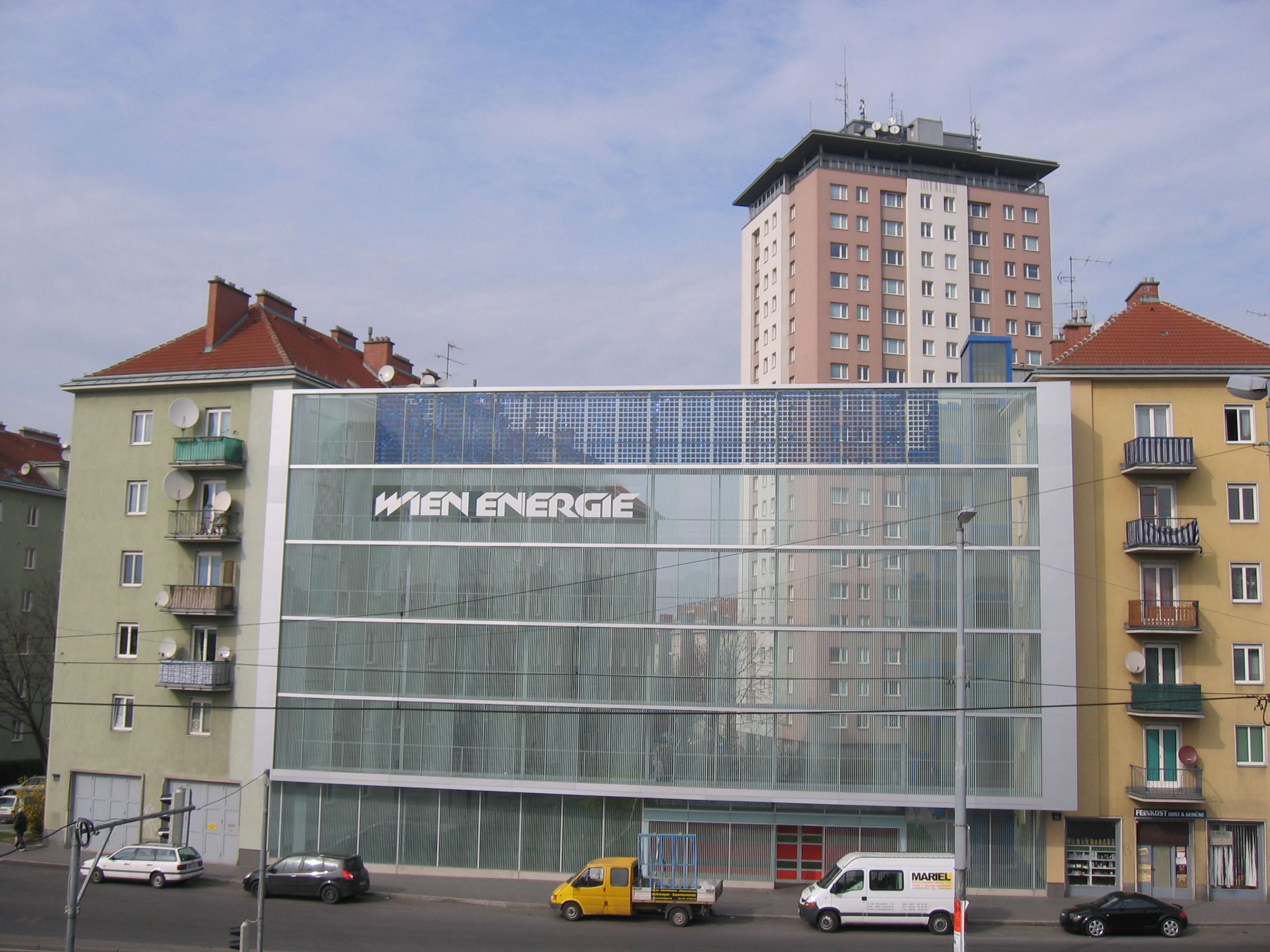
Noise Barrier with photovoltaic panel at the Theodor-Körner-Court

In the years of the Austrian Occupation (Besatzung), 1945 to 1955, Margareten was part of the British Sector of Vienna. Using the British-supplied excavators, Schlürf-maschinen and trucks, as well as through the use of more than 37,000 people who contributed over 300,000 hours of work, the clean-up could be taken forward quickly, so that Margareten was the first district of Vienna, on 19 September 1946, to be cleared and could begin to rebuild. The communal housing of the interwar period was continued, and there was the Matzleinsdorfer Tower, which introduced a new style in public housing. Instead of the former common blocks, the inter-individual houses were built in more relaxed design. Nevertheless, the population declined in the following years, until 2001. The number of foreign residents, especially from ex-Yugoslavia and Turkey increased considerably.
The biggest problem is the aging of the Margaretner residential buildings, since approximately 60% of the roughly 2,000 buildings were built before the First World War. About 75% of all dwellings are for rent. The communal housing, with 17% of all houses, is very well represented.

As in other districts of Vienna, the populace cleared space for car traffic and offered valuable buildings. Buses replaced the trams, and the U-tram (Unterpflaster tram) was built along the belt. During the construction of the tram system, the Unterpflaster was put in the middle of the Wiedner Hauptstrasse. The nearby Baroque Matzleinsdorfer church (Florianikirche) in 1965, despite protests from the population was dismantled. The new building of the church was constructed as a church without towers, at the corner of Main street / Laurenzgasse. Added to this was the expansion of Reinprechtsdorfer bridge and the Pilgram bridge. In September 1969, the Vienna S-Bahn rail Matzleinsdorfer Station Square was opened, and thus Margareten was near the Vienna tram, after a second high-level network of the public transport in Vienna. From the year 1976, the tram was finally suspended, rebuilt, and in 1980 replaced by U4.

In 1986, the former Margaretenbad was closed, but in 1989 converted into a leisure pool with water slide. Since 2006, also housed in the Margaretenbad is a fitness center. At Arbeitergasse lane, the city, built in 1990, a senior citizen's home. Almost the entire district area has been restricted traffic except the passage of roads, and the parking problem was defused by the expansion of parking (on 2 June 1997). Increasingly, segregated bicycle paths were built, and some opened streets for cycling against the one-way. In 1999, there was a slight modification of district boundaries, while in the field of Kettenbrückengasse, the boundaries of the 4th District have been extended.

Since 2000, the green space of Margareten has been increased by planting some trees during the reconstruction of roads and parking areas. In this way, several streets have already been redesigned in Margareten, such as the Upper Amtshausgasse lane. In addition, in 2007, a car park was tried in the middle belt of the joint vegetation.

Due to the increased noise (automobile traffic, railway, suburban railway), a barrier was added in 2007. In the area of the Vienna belt, an 18-metre (59 ft) high and 150-metre (490 ft) long noise barrier was erected in the community-development Theodor Körner Hof. The elements are made of glass to get enough light and brightness in the area between the houses. The top row as a solar panel by WienEnergie has been installed: WienStrom the first time in this form is used. By the new arrangement of the visual and shelterbelts to prevent reflection, action for the protection of birds has been taken.

== Education ==
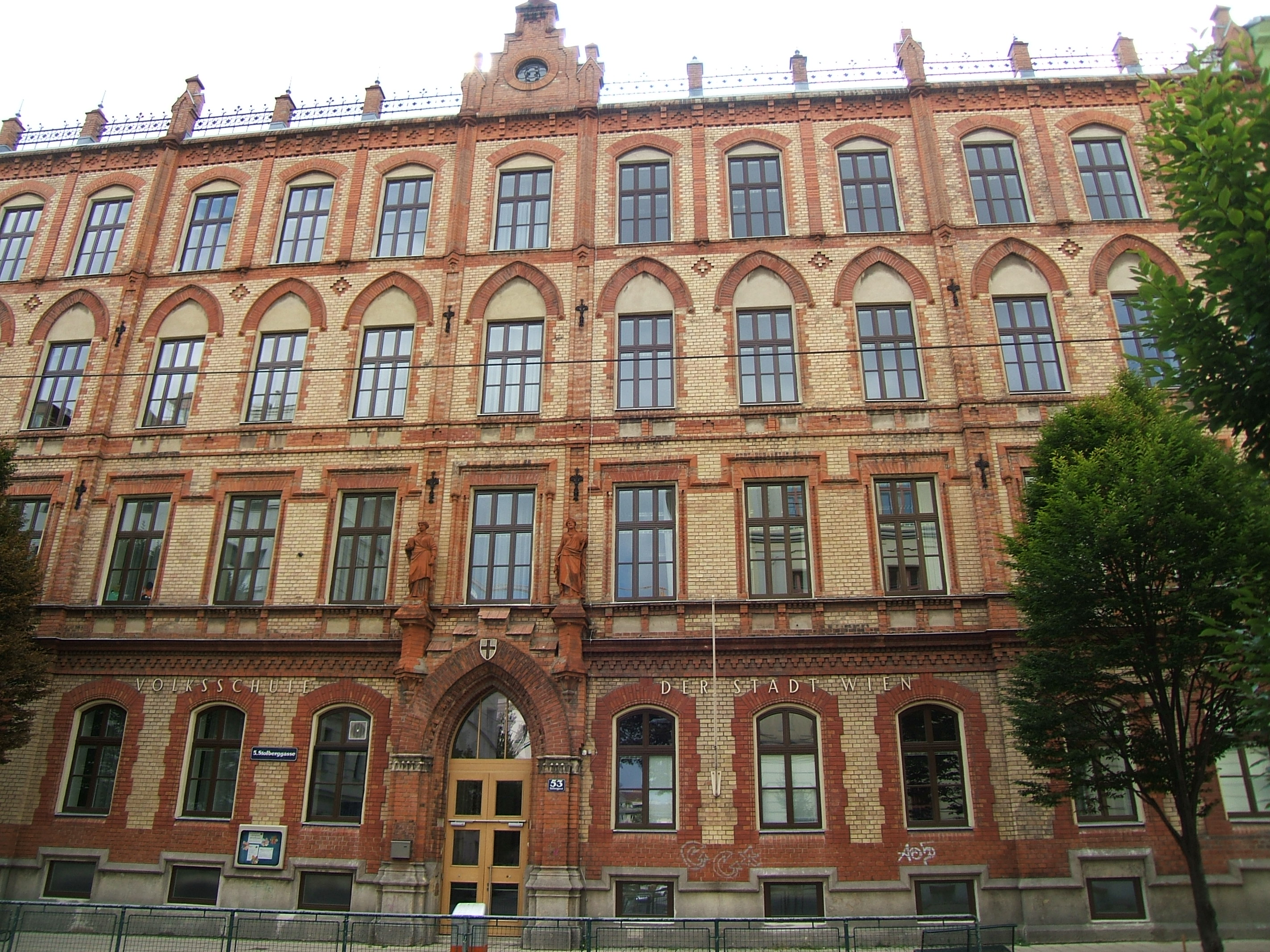
An elementary schools at Stolberggasse 53 in Wien-Margareten

Margareten has five elementary schools, three secondary schools, a special school, two grammar schools, a commercial academy, a technical college, an IT school and a vocational school.

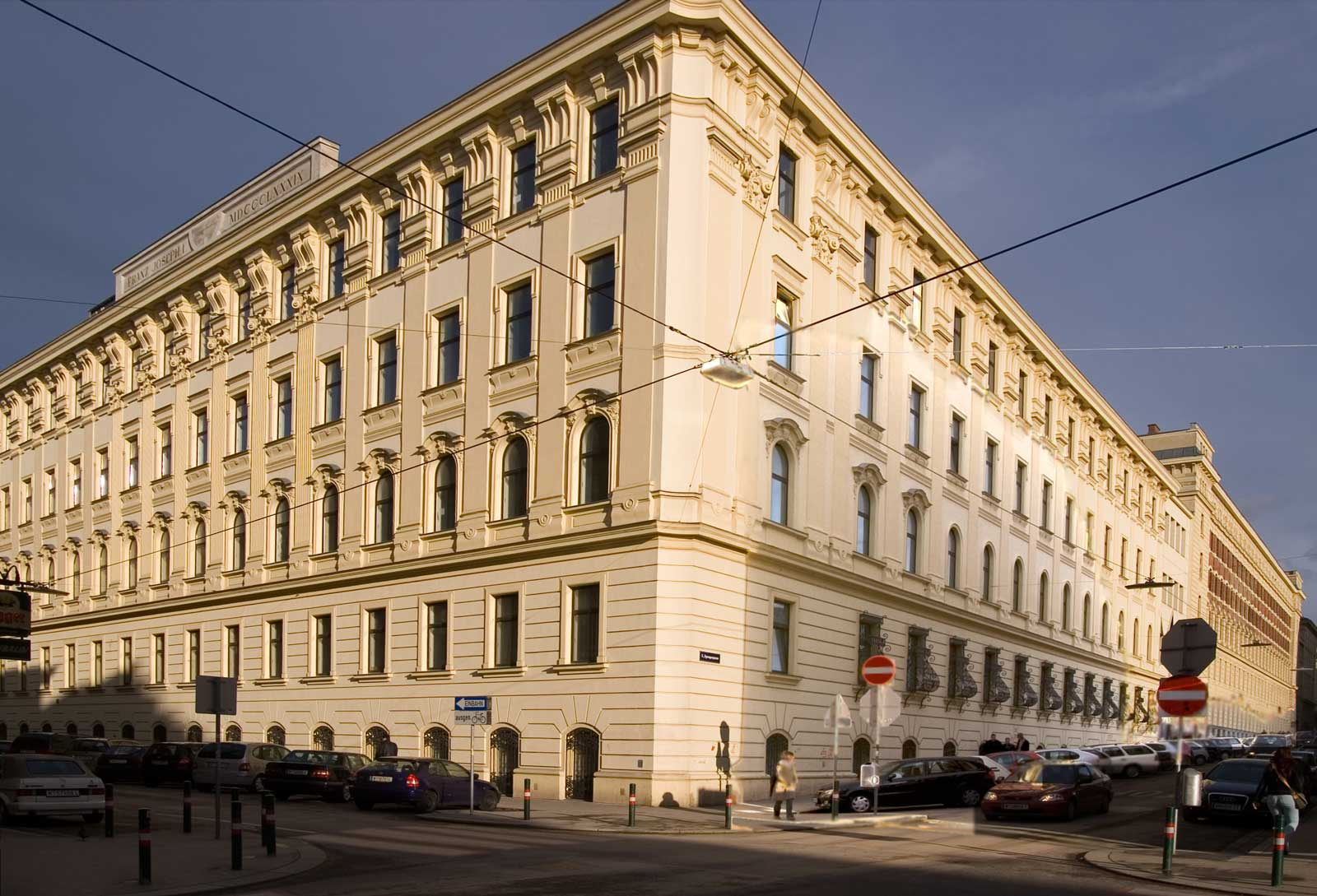
HTL Spengergasse

The HTL Spengergasse with about 2600 students and 280 teachers is an important educational institution. This school is the oldest HTL in Austria and was founded in 1758 by Empress Maria Theresa.

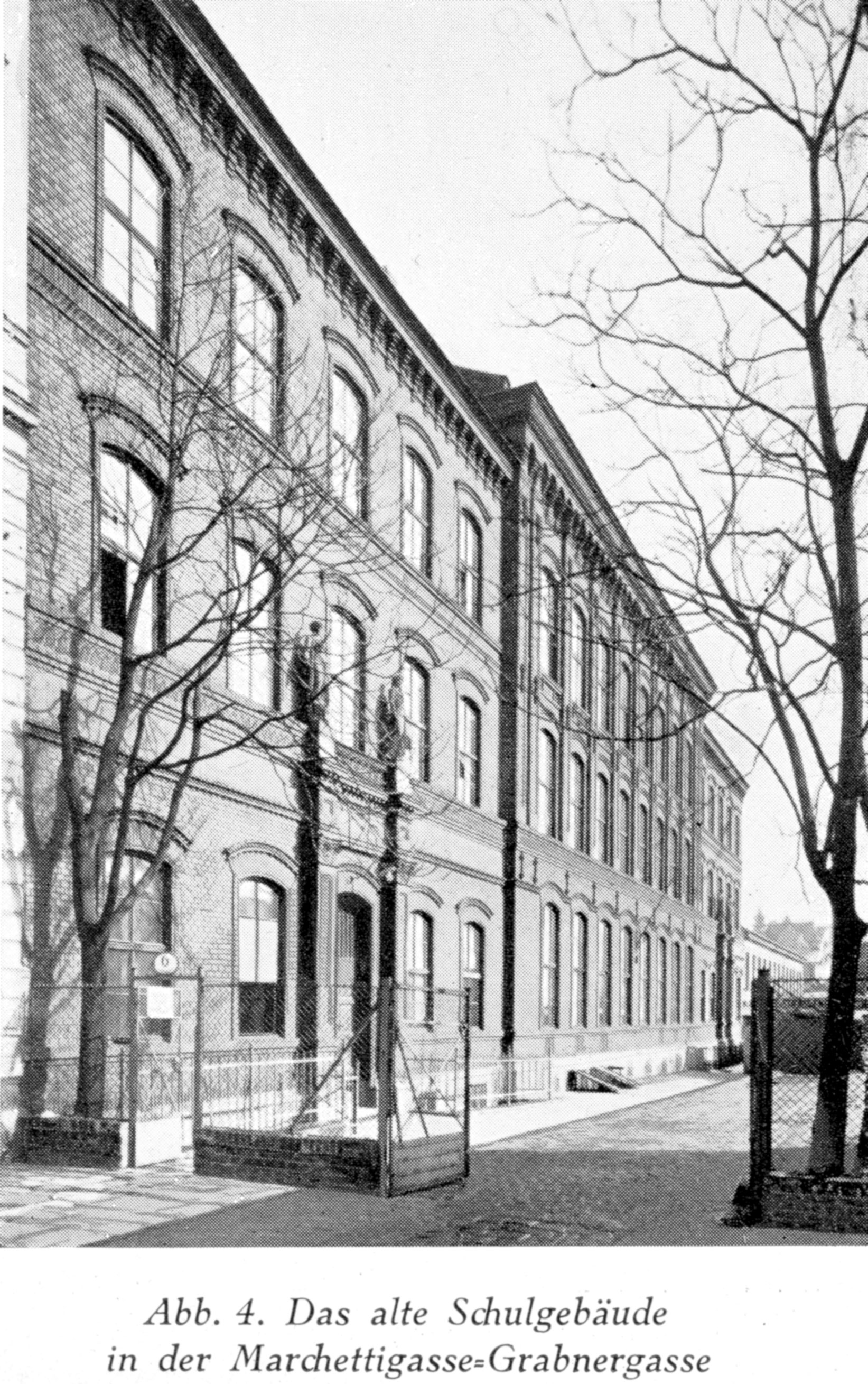
Altes Schulgebäude der HTBLVA Wien V in der Marchettigasse

The disciplines are: art and design, business management and IT & organization. This HTL is housed in the former Landwehr equipment depot.The school for IT is a one-year school with a focus on IT specialist training. Her goal is to integrate graduates directly into occupational life.

The Institute for High Energy Physics of the Austrian Academy of Sciences at Nikolsdorfer Gasse 18 (former district office 1862–1867) is the only university research facility in the district. The Institute for High Energy Physics deals with research into the smallest building blocks of matter and the forces acting between them (interactions). To this end, the institute works together with the European Research Center for Particle Physics CERN in Geneva.

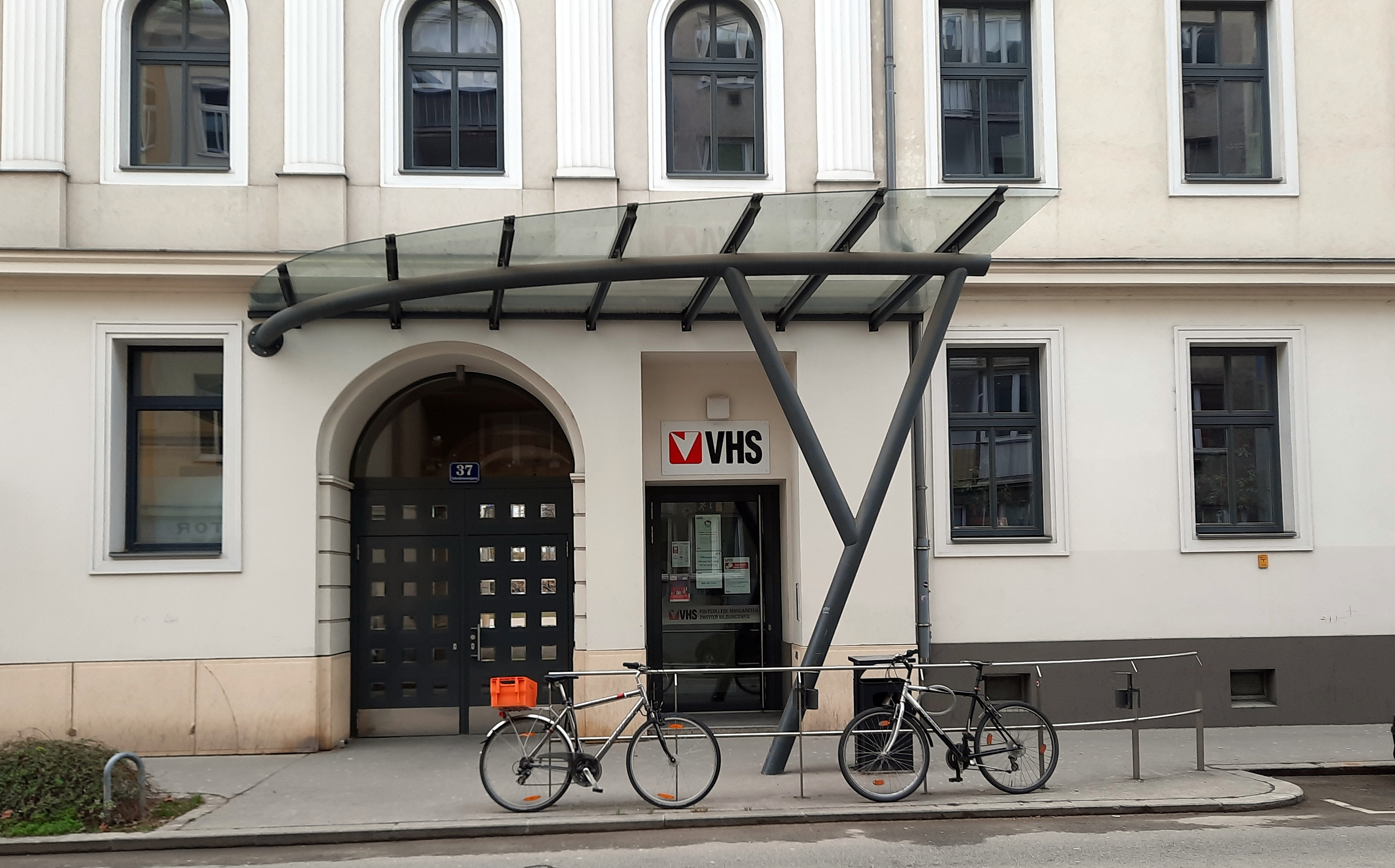
VHS Siebenbrunngengasse 37

The adult education center (VHS) polycollege in Margareten has existed for 120 years. The polycollege is the largest of Vienna's 18 adult education centers and was founded in 1887 as the "Wiener Volksbildungsverein". On February 16, 2019, the school in Stöbergasse was closed and the courses were divided up at other locations.The building was demolished in favor of a new building for rental apartments. The new main location for the "VHS Polycollege Margareten Wieden" is at Siebenbrunnengasse 37.

== Population ==
Historical population
Year	Pop.	±%
1869	54,010	—
1880	67,018	+24.1%
1890	84,031	+25.4%
1900	107,810	+28.3%
1910	105,551	−2.1%
1923	89,887	−14.8%
1934	87,767	−2.4%
1939	79,349	−9.6%
1951	71,627	−9.7%
1961	69,548	−2.9%
1971	60,529	−13.0%
1981	52,436	−13.4%
1991	51,521	−1.7%
2001	49,111	−4.7%
2011	52,595	+7.1%
2021	53,722	+2.1%
Source: Censuses

In 1869, nearly 54,000 people lived in the district area. Over the next 30 to 40 years, the population doubled to almost 108,000 (circa 1900). Although it was only after World War I when the large apartment buildings were built along the Vienna belt, the population declined continuously until the 2001 census, due to the increased housing needs. Since the record-low population of 49,116 in 2001, there has again been a slight increase in the population, of about +1% per year.

Margaret is, with over 25,000 inhabitants per km^{2}, one of the most densely populated districts in Vienna.

=== Population structure ===
The proportion of people who are 60 years, and over, is below average with 19.7%, since for Vienna citywide, this share is 22.2%. The proportion of the population under 15 years was 14.3%. The percentage of female population corresponds to 52.4%, exactly the average of Vienna.
Of the 42,111 residents of Margaret in 2001 who were aged over 15 years, 12.6% have a university degree, University of Applied Sciences in Austria or Academy, as the highest level of education (higher than Vienna's average: 11.8%). Another 16.4% have completed a Matura (Vienna average: 15.7%), 34.2% had an Apprenticeship or Austrian school BMS (below Vienna's average: 39.2%), and 36.9% of the Margaretners have compulsory education (as the highest degree, Vienna average: 33.2%).
The average annual net income of a worker in 2005 was 16,873 euros (Vienna: 18,948 euros), with a retired annual income of 15,558 euros (Vienna: 16,802 euros). The male population earned 18,436 euros (net Pensioner: 17,915 Euros), however, the female population earned only 15,143 euros (net Pensioner: 14,062 euros). Overall, Margareten is about 11% below the average economic level of Vienna.

=== Origin and language ===
The proportion of Margaretners with foreign citizenship in 2001 was, with 23.2%, around 6% above the average of Vienna. There were 7% of Margaretners with citizenship of Serbia and Montenegro, 4.4% Turkish citizen. Behind, followed Bosnia (at 2.3%) and Croats and Germans, whose share of the population, however, is only 1.5 to 1%. Overall, in 2001 approximately 32% of Margaretners had been born in another country; therefore, only 64.4% indicated the Margaretner German as a common language. Another 10.2% spoke mainly Serbian, 7.6% Turkish, 3.4% Croatian and 1.1% Hungarian (in 2001).

=== Religious denominations ===
The proportion of people of Roman Catholic faith is 42.2% (in 2001). There are the townships of three Roman Catholic parishes that belong to the City Deanery 4 / 5 (Archdiocese of Vienna). Proportionately, behind the people with a Roman Catholic denomination, 11.9% followed Islamic and 9.6% with Eastern Orthodox religion. The followers of the Evangelical church are, at 4.3%, in the fourth spot. Yet, 24.6% of Margaretners stated no religious persuasion.

== Politics ==
District Director since 1919
Albert Hummel (SPÖ)	1919–1921
Leopold Rister (SPÖ)	1921–1934
No District Director	1934–1945
Fritz Lendvai (KPÖ)	4/1945–7/1945
Max Tober (SPÖ)	1945–1950
Franz Grubeck (SPÖ)	1950–1962
Otto Reisz (SPÖ)	1962–1969
Johann Walter (SPÖ)	1969–1989
Kurt Heinrich (SPÖ)	1989–1999
Kurt Wimmer (SPÖ)	since 1999

Only since 1890 are there records of the political life of Margareten. In the elections in the municipal council in April 1891, all six council seats were won by the Christian Social Party (the predecessor party of the Austrian People's Party. It was not until the year 1906, the breaking of the Christian-led front in Margareten, when Franz Domes was elected to represent the Socialist Workers Party (SDAP). On the basis of the existing voters until 1919, the Christian dominance was obtained.

Since the introduction of universal suffrage in Vienna in 1919, Margareten had, with the exception of the years 1934 to 1945, the only social-democratic district leader, the first Albert Hummel. The number of seats in the District changed regularly; since the 1987 elections, there are 40 district councils in Margareten. In 1987, the electoral mandates were distributed as follows: 22 SPÖ, 12 ÖVP, 4 Freedom Party (FPÖ) and 2 GAL (green).

In the district election on 10 November 1991, the SPÖ won with 19 seats, only a relative majority, the Freedom Party into second position with 9 seats, the ÖVP slid off with 8 seats to the third position and the GAL, accounted for 4 seats. Kurt Henry was re-elected as district leader, Heinrich Koch's deputy, took the place of Martina Pucher (ÖVP), Dietmar Brandl (FPÖ). The 1996 elections had a massive loss of votes of the two major parties (SPÖ and ÖVP) and electoral gains of the small parties: FPÖ, the Greens, and Liberal Forum (LIF).

In 2001, the election was marked by the electoral gains of the SPÖ and the Greens. The FPÖ lost more than 7% of the vote in 1996, but remained the second largest group. The Greens overtook the ÖVP, and thus were the third strongest force. The number of seats in 2001 was: 18 SPÖ, 8 FPÖ, 7 Green, 6 People's Party and 1 LIF.

At the last district election in 2005, there were strong electoral gains of the Greens and they were the second strongest political group. Thus Margareten sat in a development that has already been observed in other areas within the Vienna belt - the Greens to contest the district director of the SPÖ. The Freedom Party lost many votes and is only the fourth-strongest party. Each of the two major parties gained about 1% of votes. The LIF, the KPO, and the BZÖ did not made their way into the District council seats. Therefore, since 2005 the count of seats: 18 SPÖ, 10 Green, 7 FPÖ, and 5 ÖVP.

District voting 1991–2005
Year	SPÖ	ÖVP	FPÖ	Grüne	LIF	Other
1991	45.06	19.92	21.45	10.83	n.k.	1.25
1996	33.74	18.39	26.86	11.46	7.57	1.98
2001	41.35	15.08	19.80	18.21	3.64	1.92
2005	42.71	16.80	12.75	23.48	0.64	3.66

== Sights ==
The Church of St. Joseph was built in 1765–1769. The church is not only a baroque gem near the office building, Franz Schubert was consecrated here before he was buried in the Währing cemetery. A plaque commemorates this, which was attached to the outer wall of the Wiener Schubertbund 100 years after his death.

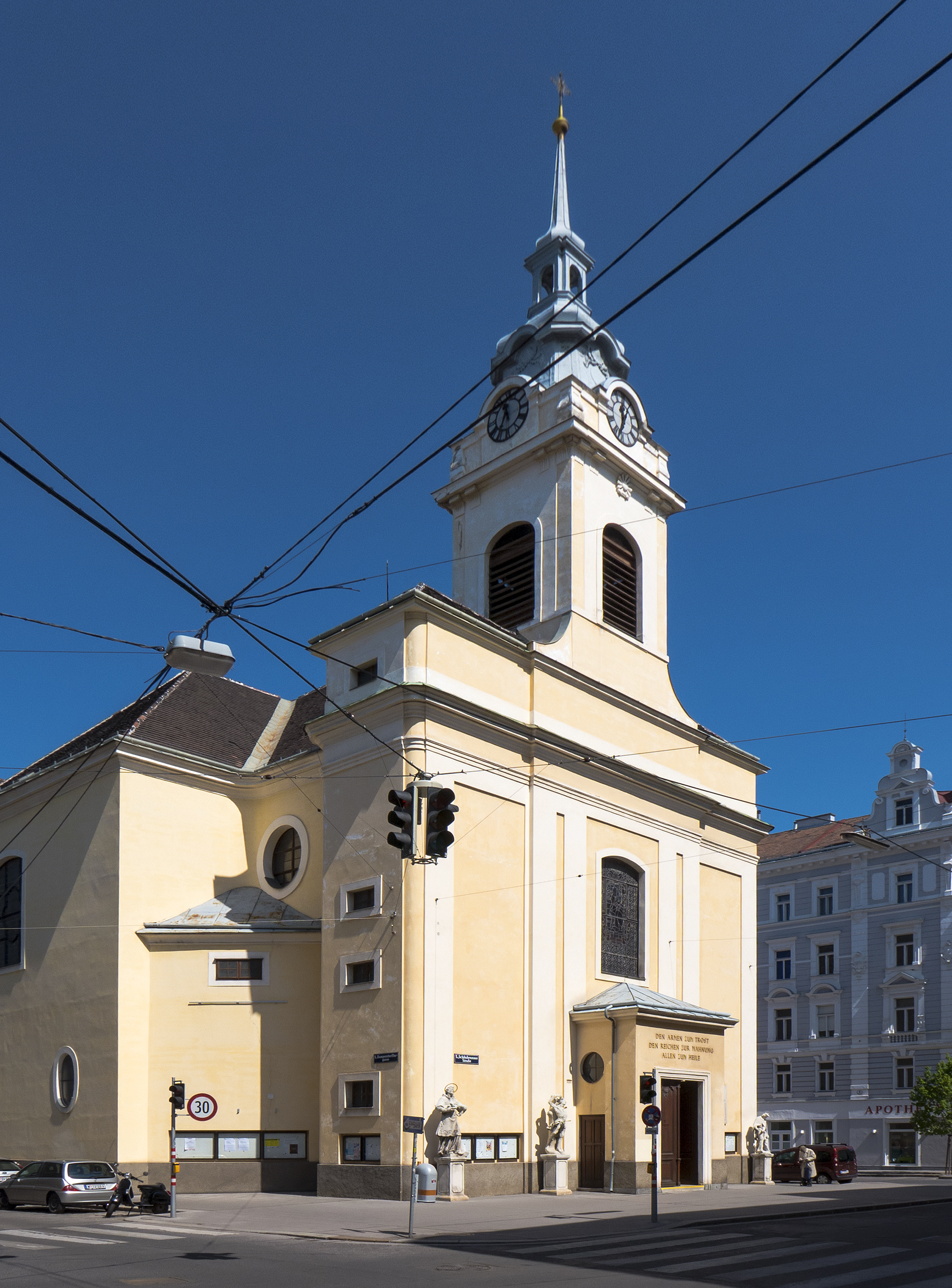
St. Josef Church

The castle-like Margaretenhof, which was built in 1884/85, is located on Margaretenplatz.

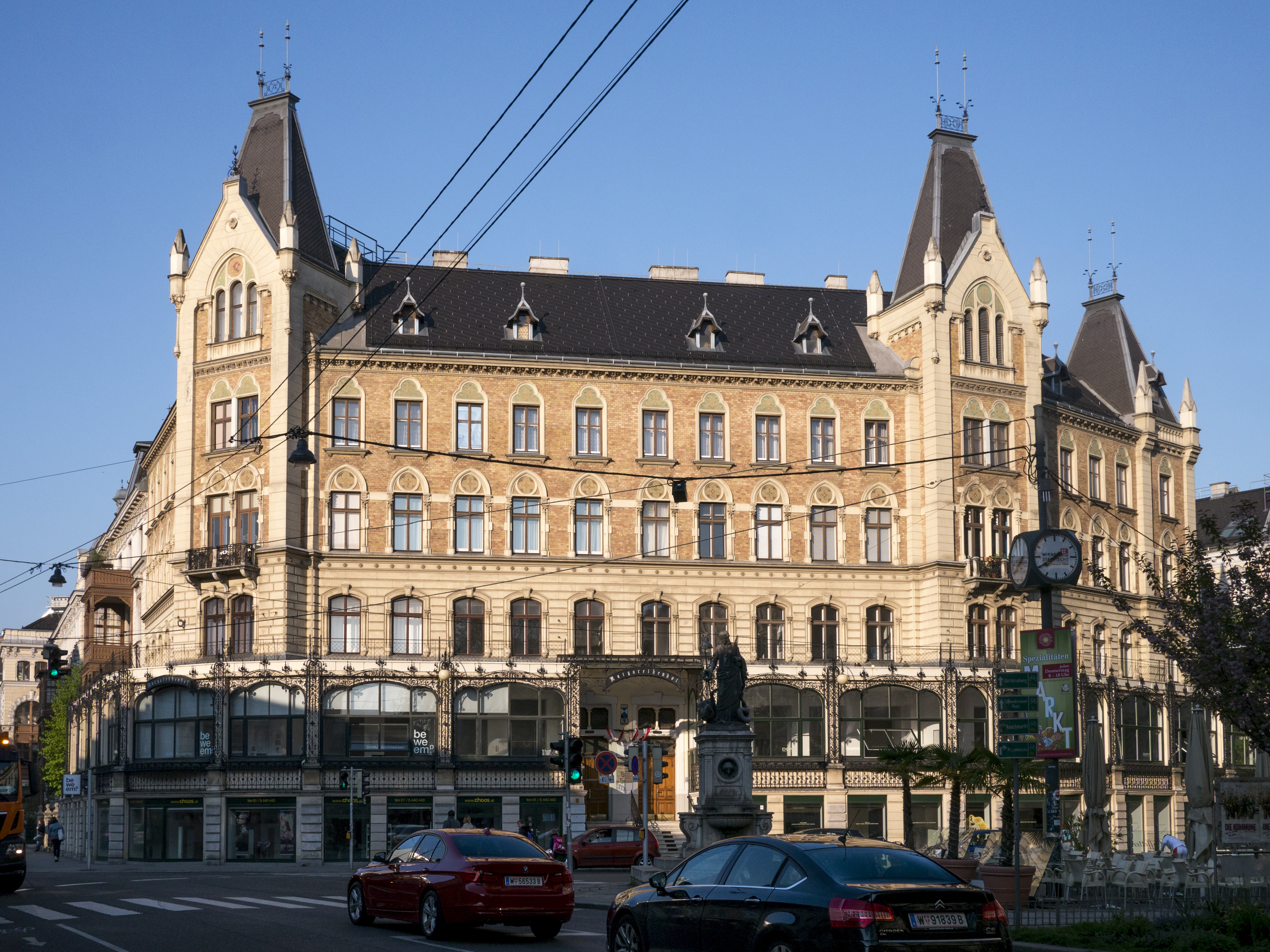
Margeretenhof

The Filmcasino at Margaretenstraße 78 in Vienna's 5th district Margareten was founded in 1911 and was known for a long time as the Margaretner Bürgerkino before it reopened in 1989.The one-room cinema has 254 seats and is characterized by the well-preserved interior in the style of the 1950s

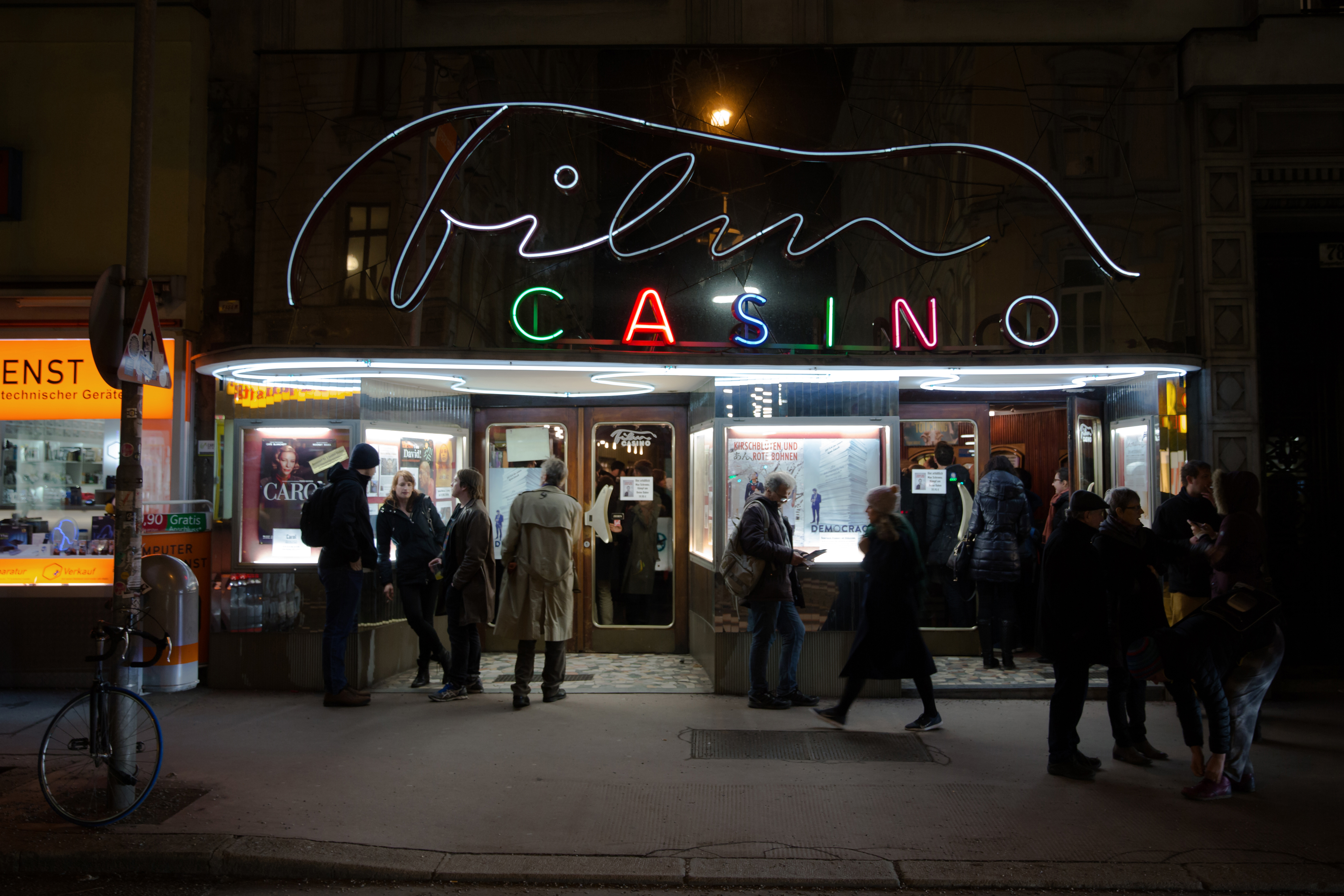
Entrance to Filmcasino

As a program and art house cinema, the Filmcasino mainly shows films from European productions, but also from Asia and Latin America as well as US independent film. There is a close cooperation with the Polyfilm film distribution company. In normal operation, there are two to five performances a day. In addition, the Filmcasino shows premieres of Austrian and European films, often followed by discussion rounds and lectures, thematic programs and special screenings (architecture film series, Cine Morning with free childcare, cinema & cake, Filmwunder children's film series, etc.) and hosts film festivals such as the Latin Film Lounge, Japannual and the Slash Film Festival.

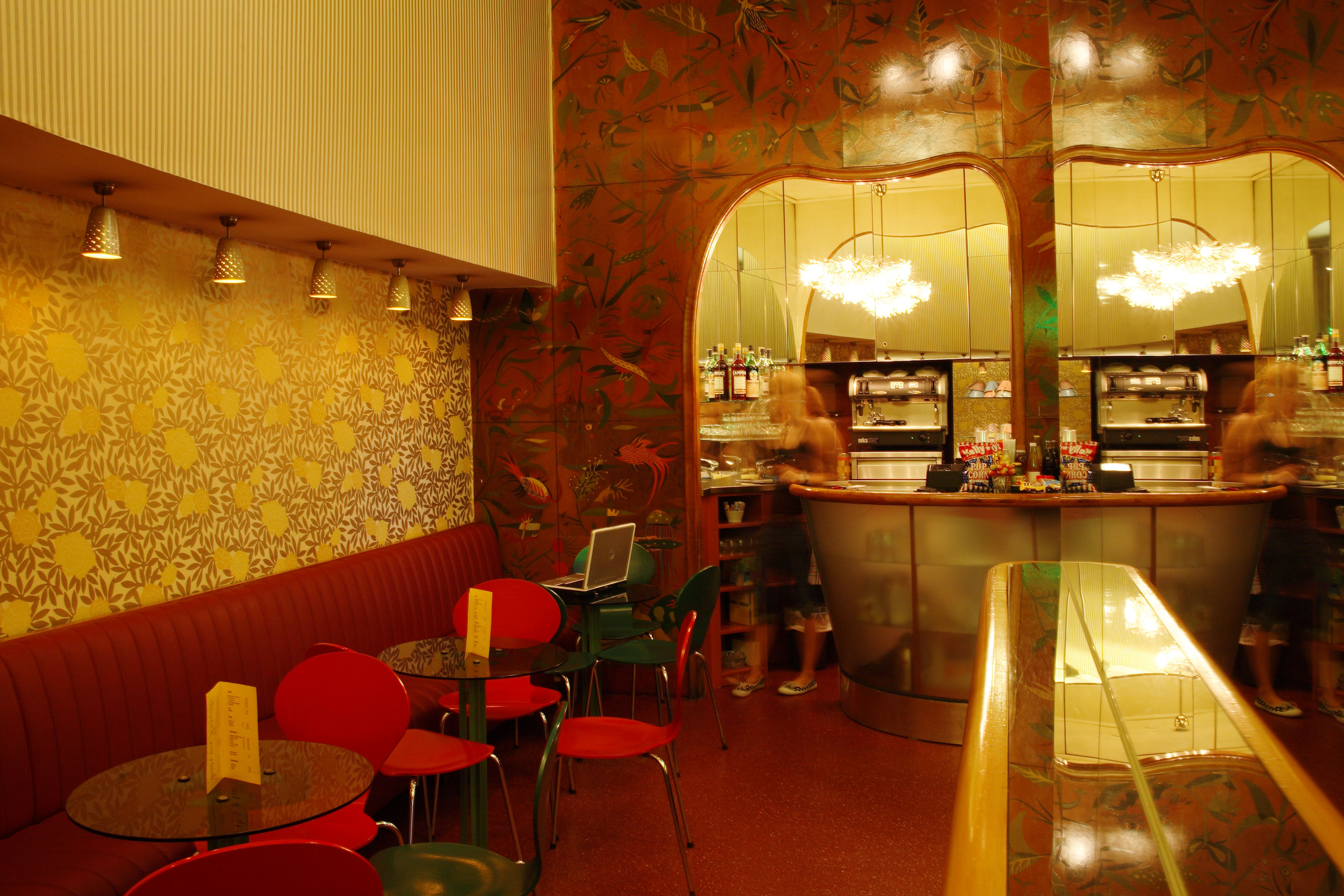
Interior of Filmcasino

The Austrian Social and Economic Museum, in its own presentation Economic Museum, (Gesellschafts- und Wirtschaftsmuseum ) is a museum in the 5th district of Vienna, Margareten. The museum is located together with the coffee museum at Vogelsanggasse 36 and is organized as a non-profit, non-partisan association on whose board of trustees the Republic of Austria and the city of Vienna are also represented.

The original Gesellschafts- und Wirtschaftsmuseum (GeWiMu) existed from January 1925 until it was suppressed by the Austrofascists in February 1934. It was the base for the development of the Vienna Method. It was founded by Otto Neurath and evolved out of the Museum für Siedlung und Städtebau (Museum for Settlement and Town Planning).

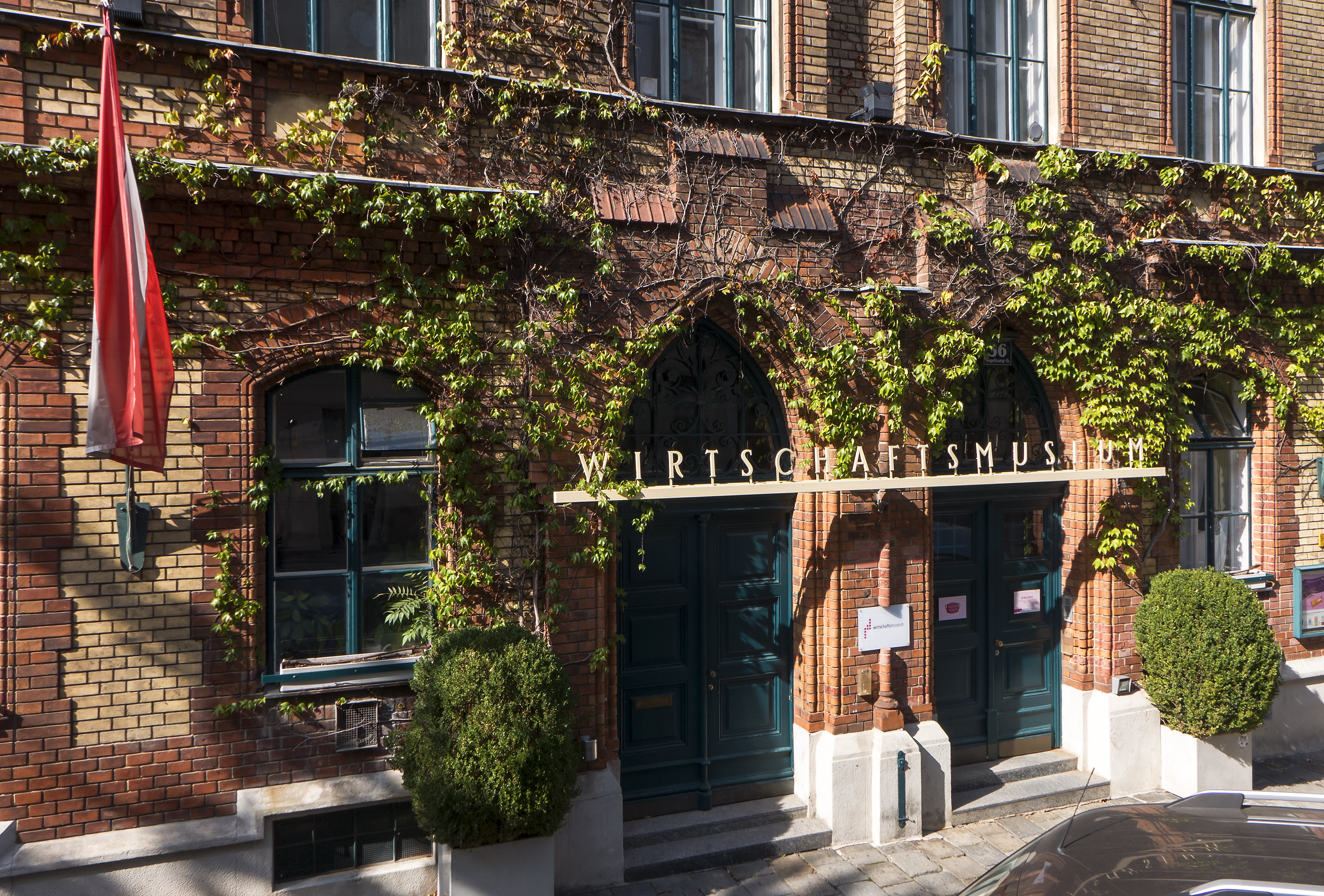
Entrance to Economic Museum

== Sport ==
The handball club Handballclub Fivers Margareten has won the Austrian Championship 3 times.

== Notable residents ==
- Johann Rudolf Schmidt von Schwarzhorn (1590–1667), was a Swiss native from Stein am Rhein. He later became vice-president of the Imperial War Council in Vienna and was made a baron in 1650. From 1637 to 1657, Schwarzhorn was the owner of the manors of Margareten and Nikolsdorf and completed Margareten Castle in 1647 to 1667, which was destroyed again in the year of the Turks in 1683.
- Karl Freiherr von Vogelsang (3 September 1818 – 8 November 1890), a journalist, politician and Catholic social reformer, was one of the mentors of the Christian Social movement in Austria-Hungary.
- Ludovika Froebe (27 January 1847- 3 July 1922) was an Austrian painter.
- Hans Rohn (25 February 25, 1868- 23 December 1955) was an Austrian cartographer, lithographer and academic painter.
- Adam Schreck (17 December 1796 born in Margareten- 29 March 1871) was an Austrian Augustinian canon.
- Andreas P. Pittler (born 21 November 1964 in Vienna) is an Austrian writer.
- Ernst Hinterberger (17 October 1931 – 14 May 2012) was an Austrian writer of novels, particularly detective novels, plays and successful sitcoms. His first TV scripts were unusual for their use of genuine Vienna dialect.
- Ernst Arnold (12 February 1890- 5 January 1962), also named as Ernst Jeschke) was a composer, lyricist and one of the most famous authors and singers of Viennese songs.
- Johann "Hans" Hölzel (19 February 1957 – 6 February 1998), better known by his stage name Falco, was an Austrian musician, singer and composer.
- Hans Moser (6 August 1880 – 19 June 1964) was an Austrian actor.
- Margarete Schütte-Lihotzky (23 January 1897 in Margareten- 18 January 2000 in Vienna) was one of the first women to study architecture in Austria and probably the first woman to start the profession in Austria practiced extensively. She lived and worked in Germany and the Soviet Union for a number of years. The design of the Frankfurt kitchen made her internationally known.
- Bruno Kreisky (22 January 1911 – 29 July 1990) was an Austrian social democratic politician who served as Foreign Minister from 1959 to 1966 and as Chancellor from 1970 to 1983. Aged 72 at the end of his chancellorship, he was the oldest Chancellor after World War II. His 13-year tenure was the longest of any Chancellor in republican Austria.
- Karl Lueger(24 October 1844 – 10 March 1910 in Vienna) was an Austrian politician, founder of the Christian Social Party (CS) and mayor of Vienna from 1897 to 1910.
- Karl Wlaschek (4 August 1917 – 31 May 2015) was the founder of the Austrian supermarket chain Billa.

== Coat of arms ==
Seal of Margareten

The coat of arms of the district is a six-part seal and represents the six former, independent suburbs merged: Margareten, Nikolsdorf, Matzleinsdorf, Hundsturm, Reinprechtsdorf and Laurenzergrund. The six arms are allocated as follows:

- Margareten (middle): It shows the Holy Margaret of Antioch, sitting on clouds against a golden background. Under it is a green dragon. The emblem is on the end of the 14th century Margareten castle, donated back to the Chapel.
- Nikolsdorf (upper left): It shows the Saint Nicholas of Myra on a red background on a green meadow. The emblem was chosen because the town, in honor of the founder Nikolaus Oláh, was originally called "Nikolausdorf".
- Matzleinsdorf (upper right): The upper-right part shows a coats of arms with Saint Florian von Lorch with a red-cross flag. This symbol for the District of Matzleinsdorf part was chosen because Florian is the patron of the local parish church.
- Hundsturm (lower left): On a blue background is a picture of a silver tower, from which a silver unicorn is sticking out. The emblem symbolizes the eponymous castle, built in 1672.
- Reinprechtsdorf (bottom right): This part has a blue, gilded orb-cross, which was taken from the seal of the Vienna Bürgerspital. Until the 18th century, this was the landlord of the place.
- Laurenzergrund (bottom): The lower panel shows the symbol of the martyrdom of Saint Lawrence of Rome, who was tortured to death in a fire grate.
