= Hundsturm =

Suburb of Vienna, Austria

- Suburb
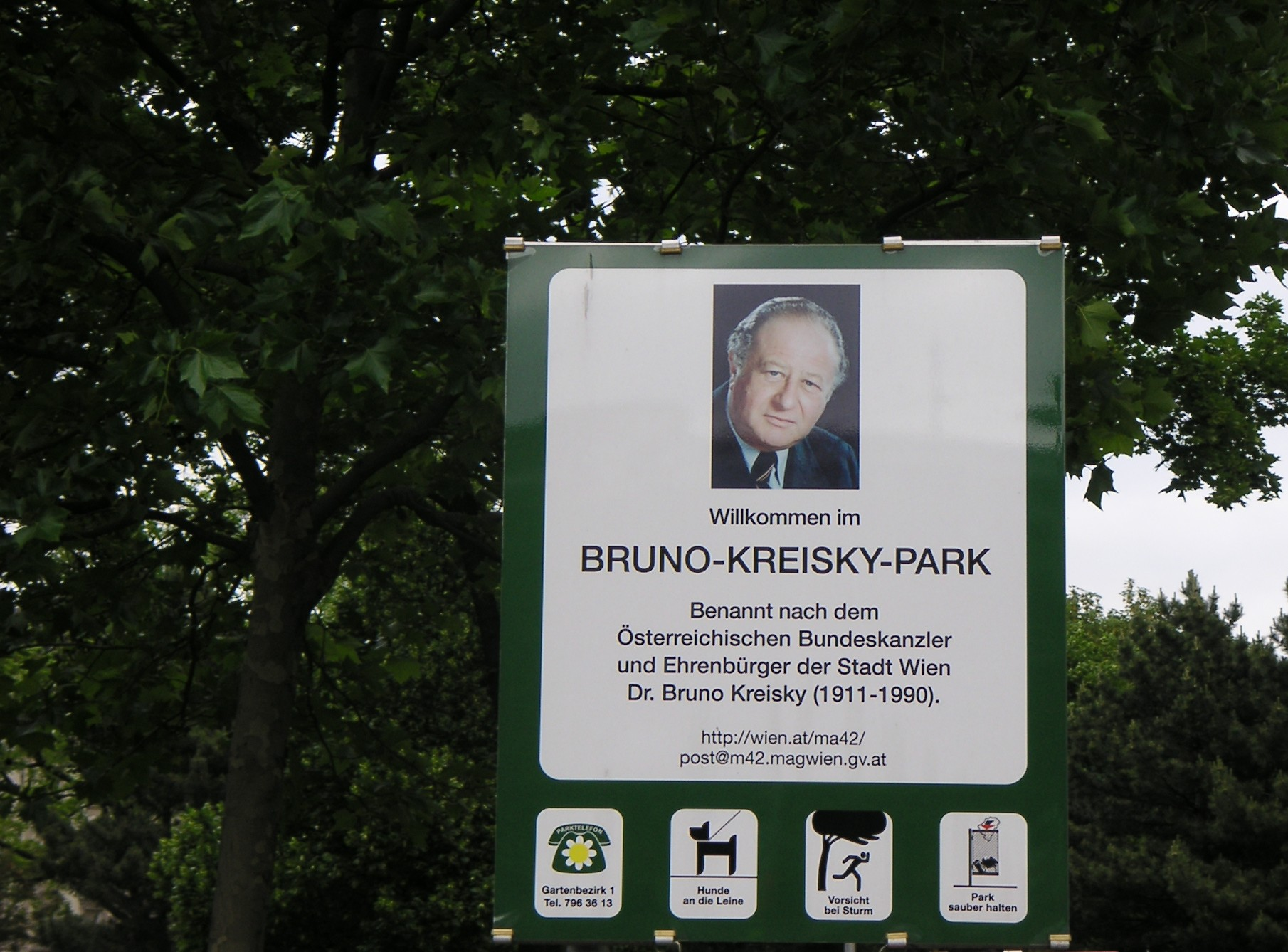
- Entrance to Bruno-Kreisky-Park

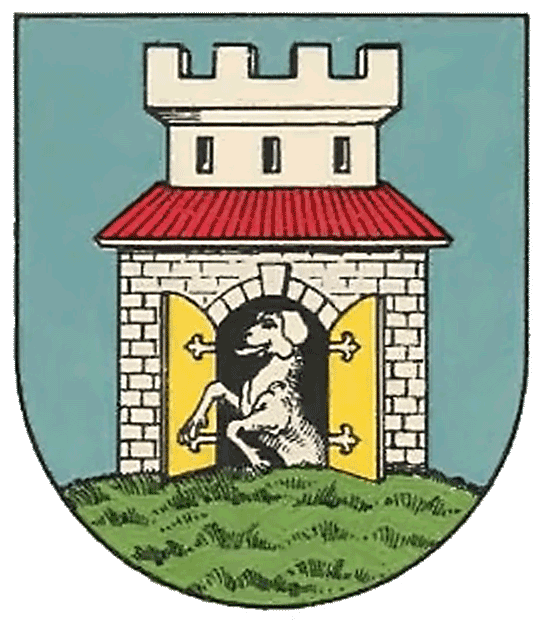
- Coat of arms

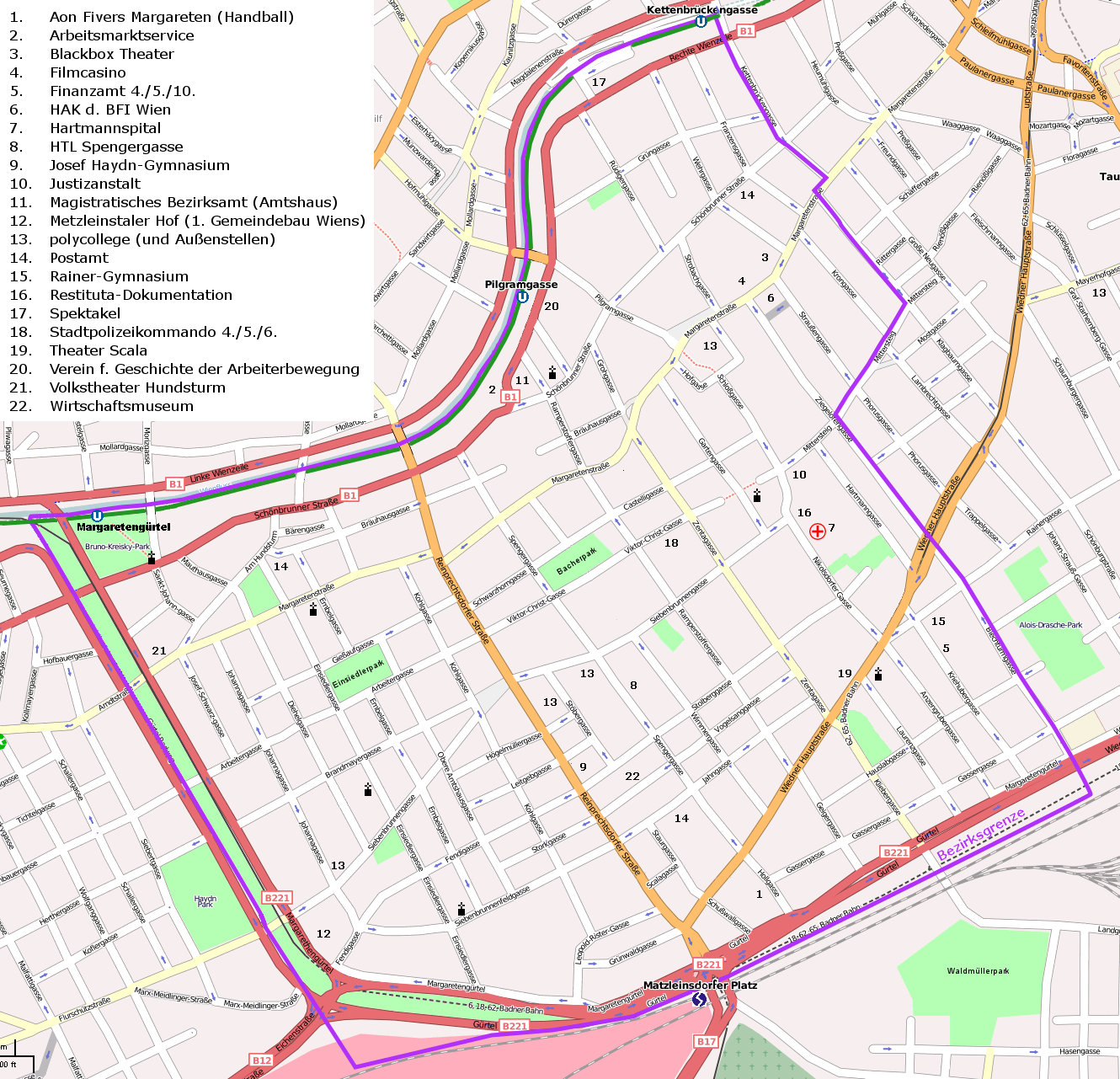
- Coordinates: 48°11′17″N 16°20′52″E

Hundsturm was an independent municipality (Gemeinde) of Austria until 1850 and is today a suburb of Vienna the city's 5th District, Margareten.

The Hundsturm coat of arms shows, on a blue background, a castle tower on a green meadow. From the open door of the golden tower jumps a dog.

== History ==
In 1600, Archduke Matthias, who later became Emperor, built a Rüdenhausen in Hundsturm. The name Hundsturm ("Hounds Tower") might come from this Rüdenhausen. It is more likely, however, that the name goes back to the former mill, which was occupied in 1408 as the first time in the disk Hunczmühle Ried. In 1632, the first documented mention of Hundsturm was made.

The Rüdenhausen was demolished in 1672, when Hundsturm Castle was built in its place. During the 17th Century, the settlement grew around the castle, especially along the present Schönbrunnerstraße between Spengergasse and Margaretengürtel. The castle was later demolished during the 19th Century. The last parts of the castle grounds were demolished in 1884. The land was then parcelled off and sold.

In 1842, the municipality of Hundsturm was purchased by Vienna. The incorporation took place in 1850 as part of the original configuration of the 4th District Wieden. However, in 1862, Hundsturm was allocated to the new 5th District Margareten. In 1907, smaller parts of the former suburb were re-zoned into the 12th District Meidling.

Hundsturmer Friedhof was founded within the suburb in 1783. Through the re-zoning in 1907, it now is part of the 12th district. The cemetery has since been transformed into a park named after composer Joseph Haydn, whose remains had been originally buried there in 1809. The remains have since been transferred to Bergkirche in Eisenstadt.

== Gallery ==
Old Scenes of Hundsturm

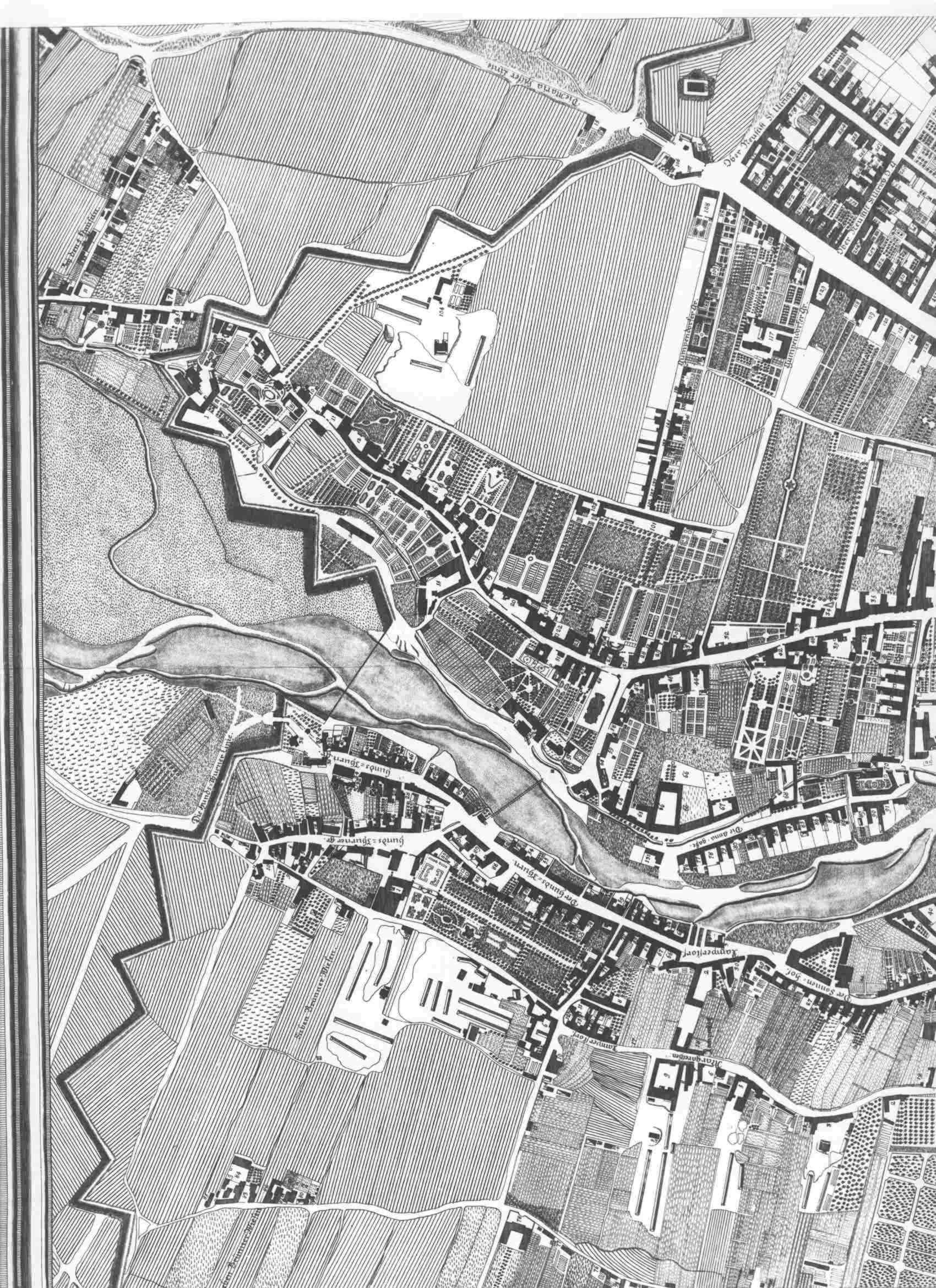
Hundsturm circa 1773

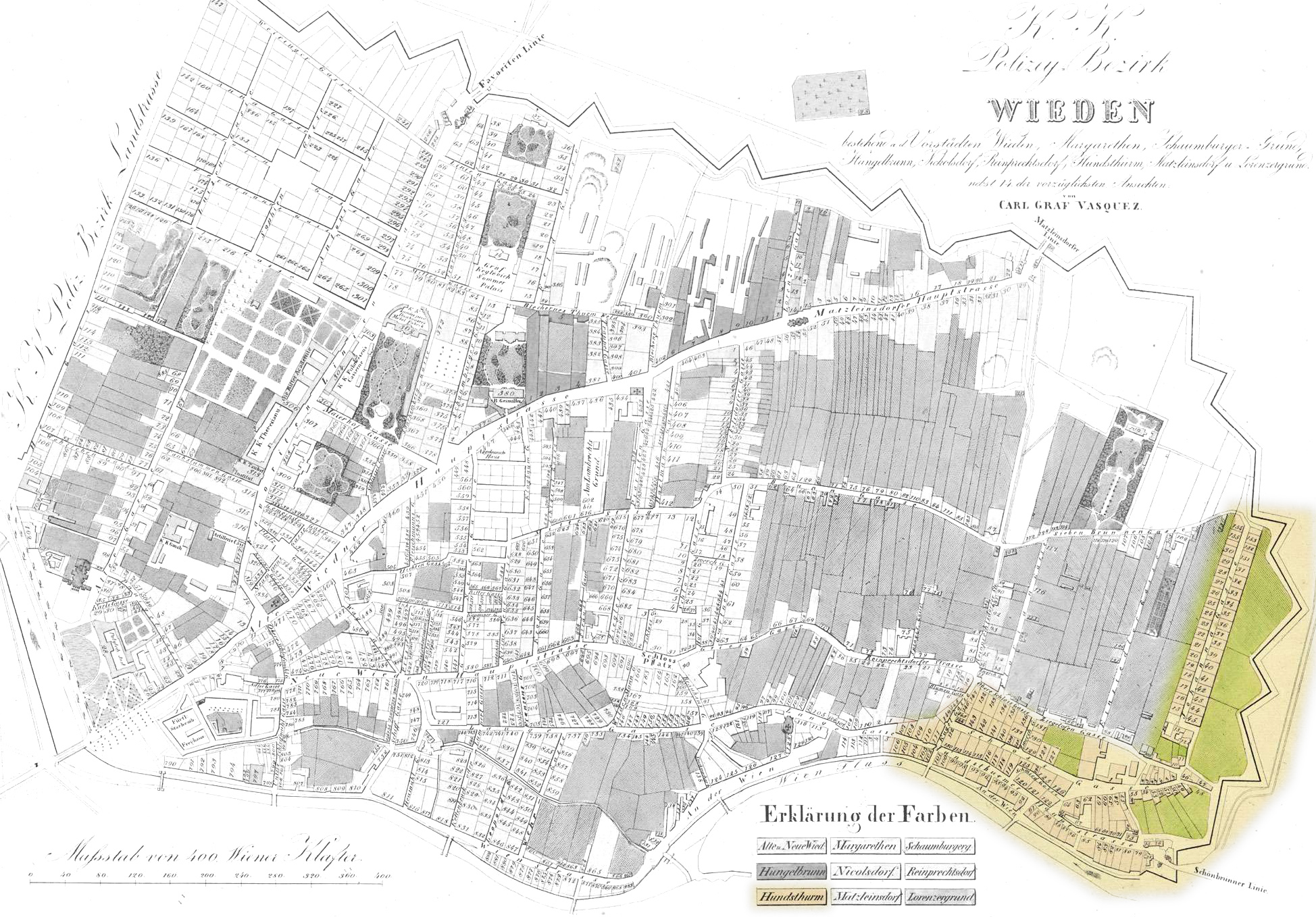
Hundsturm circa 1830

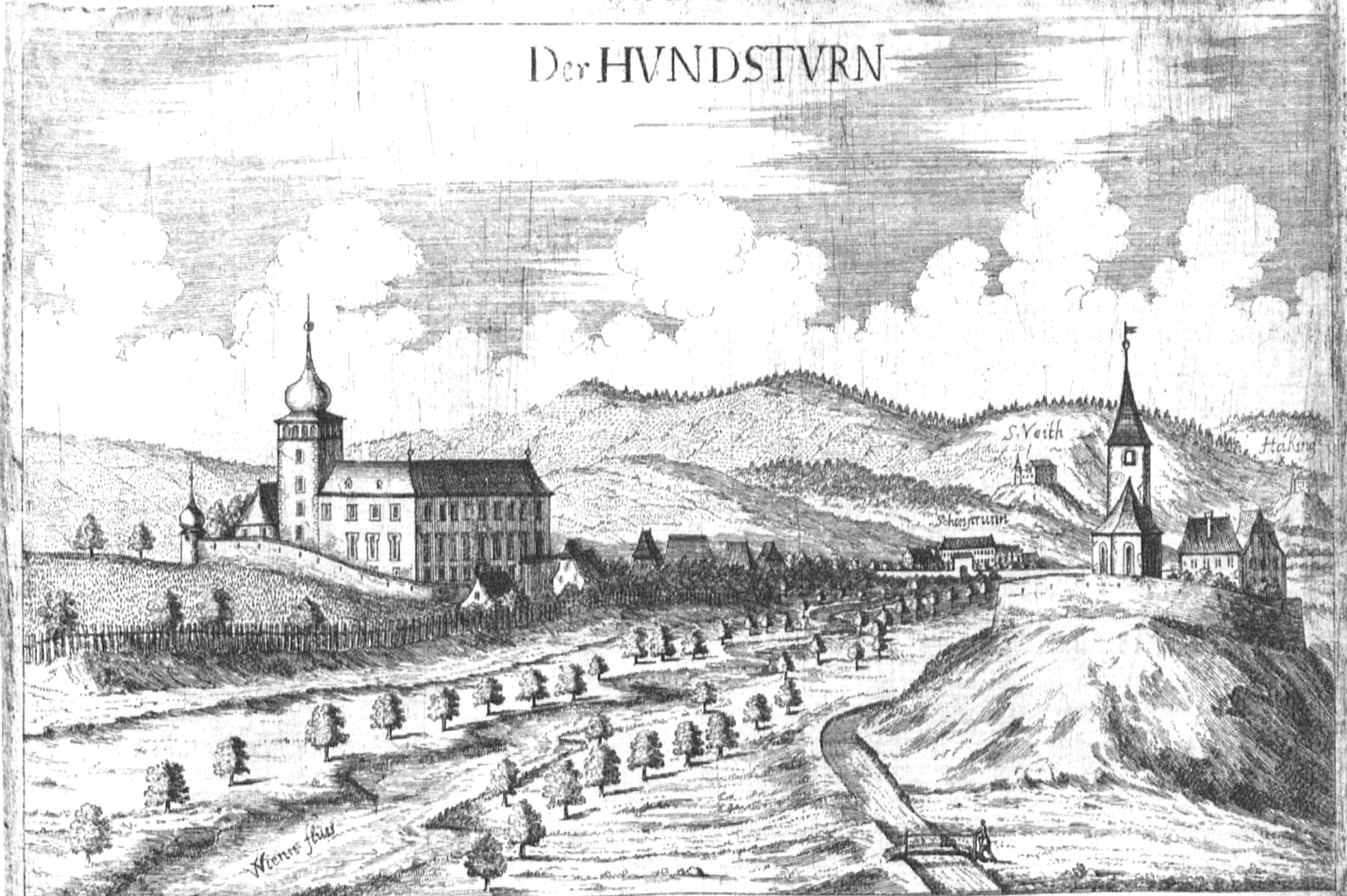
Hundsturm Castle from the west

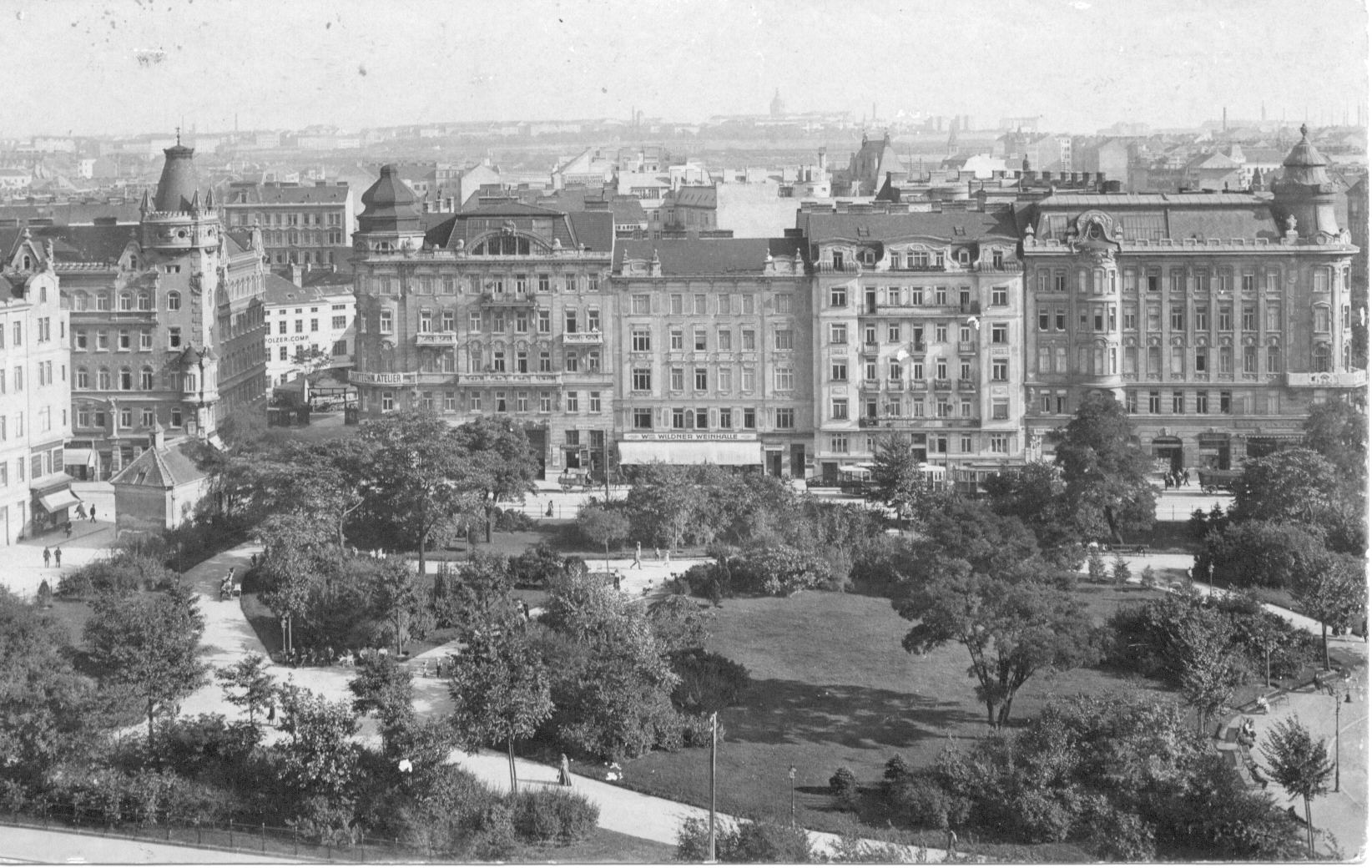
Bruno-Kreisky-Park in World War II (former St. Johann-Park)
