= Jakob Gauermann =

German painter (1773–1843)

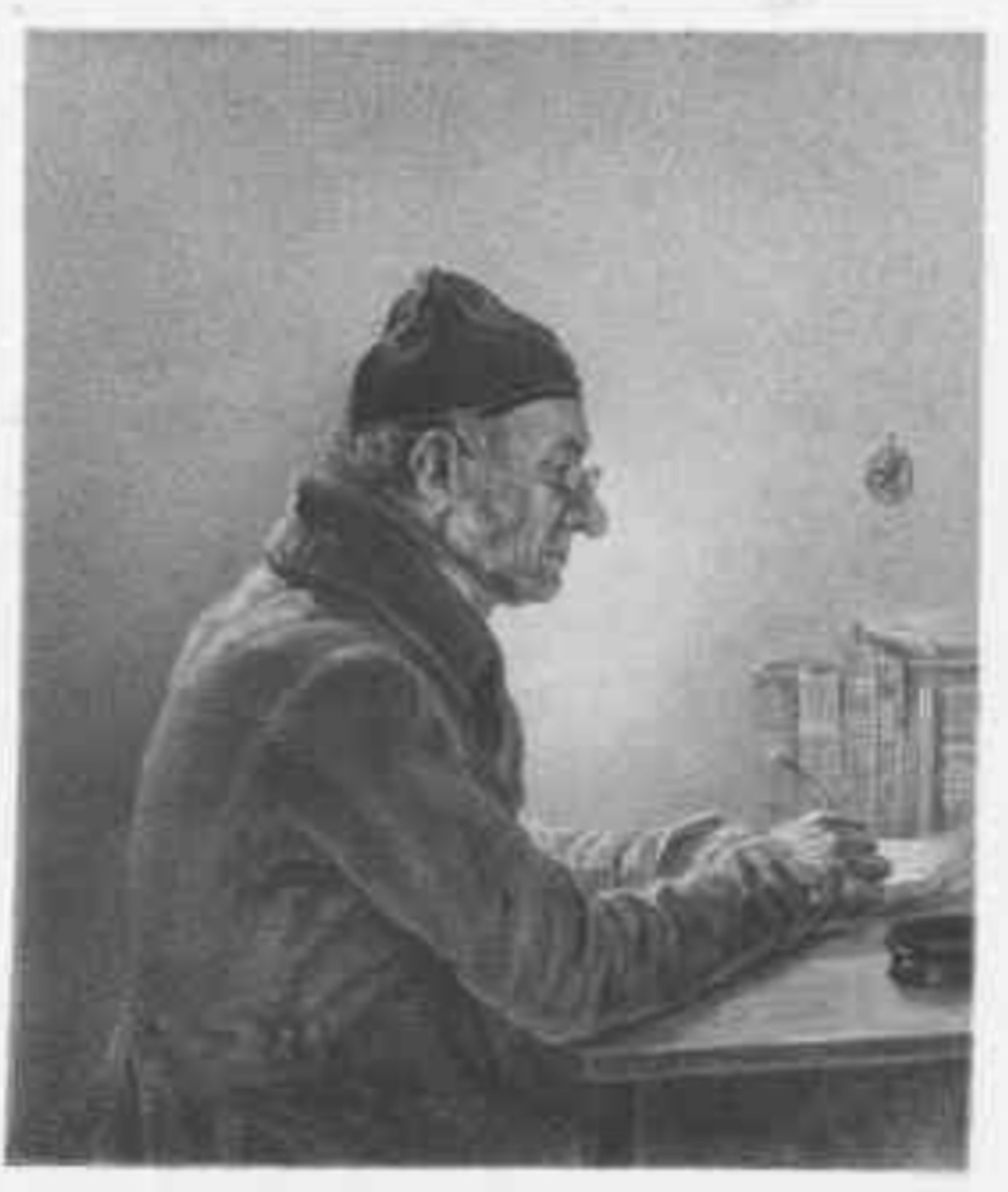
Portrait of Jakob Gauermann by his son Friedrich Gauermann, c. 1843

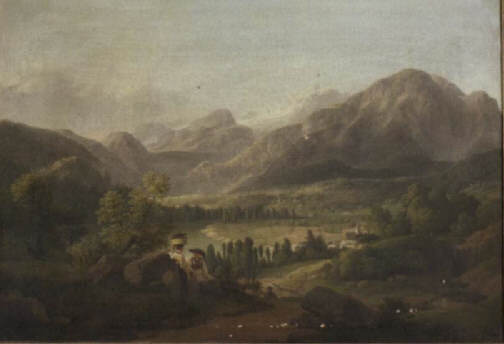
Landscape with the Altaussee lake and the Hallstätter Glacier, 1826

Jakob Gauermann (1773–1843) was a German landscape and genre painter and engraver.

== Life ==
He was born in 1773 in Oeffingen, near Stuttgart. He at first worked as a stonemason at Hohenheim. His strong inclination for drawing brought him to the knowledge of Charles Eugene, Duke of Württemberg, who enabled him to receive an education in art at the Karlsschule Stuttgart. After this he travelled for six years in Switzerland. In 1798 he went to Vienna. He visited Tyrol and Styria, where he made sketches, which he worked up into water-colour drawings and oil pictures. He also executed several etchings of landscapes.

Gauermann died in Vienna in 1843 and was buried in Hundsturmer Cemetery. His grave has since been moved.

== See also ==
- list of German painters
