= Ring of Honour of the City of Vienna =

Austrian civil decoration

The Ring of Honour of the City of Vienna (German: Ehrenring der Stadt Wien) is a decoration awarded since 1925 to people who have made an outstanding contribution to the enhancement of the prestige of the city of Vienna through exceptional artistic or scientific achievements and found recognition beyond the borders of Austria. It is one of the highest distinctions of the city of Vienna.

== History ==
The ring of honour was established by the Bürgermeister Karl Seitz, as confirmed by the Vienna City Constitution (Wiener Stadtverfassung) of 1968. It was first awarded in 1925, although strictly defined criteria for the award were not laid down.

== Description ==
In its present form, which dates from 1946, the golden ring is mounted with a shield-shaped onyx plaque edged in gold on which is depicted, as in the seal of Vienna, an eagle also in gold with the arms of Vienna in coloured enamel on an escutcheon on its breast. The shanks of the ring are decorated with golden laurel leaves. The inside of the ring bears a small gold plaque engraved with a dedication to the recipient.

== Recipients of the Ehrenring up to 2004 ==
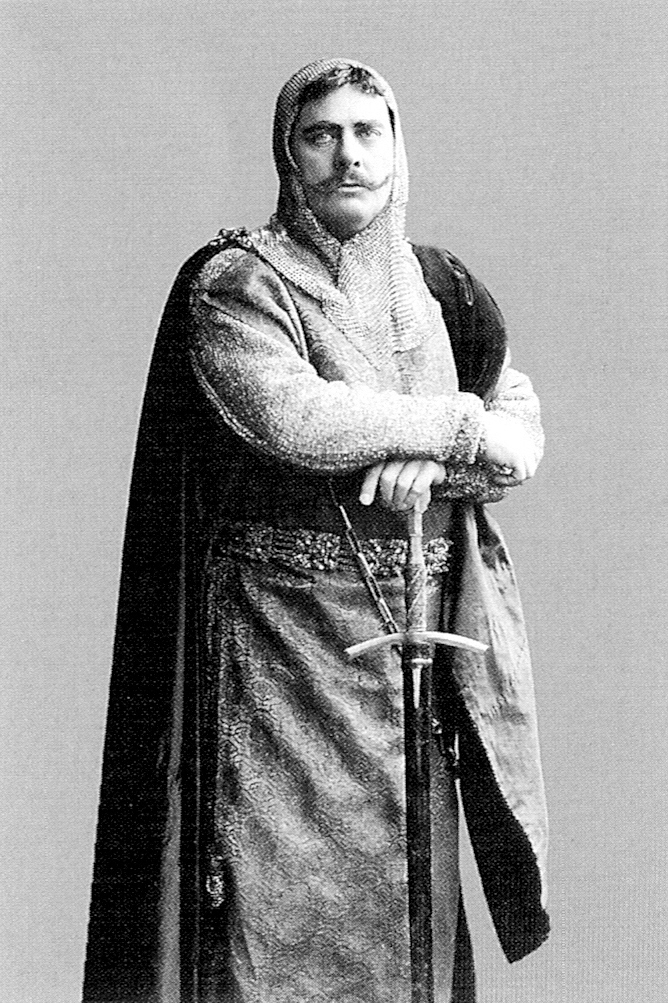
Max Devrient

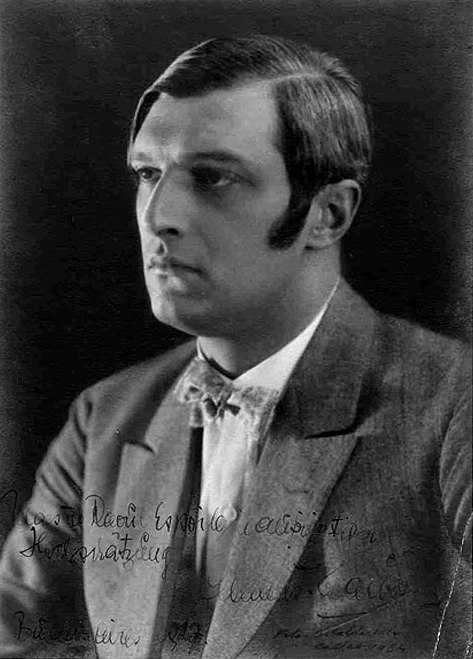
Clemens Krauss

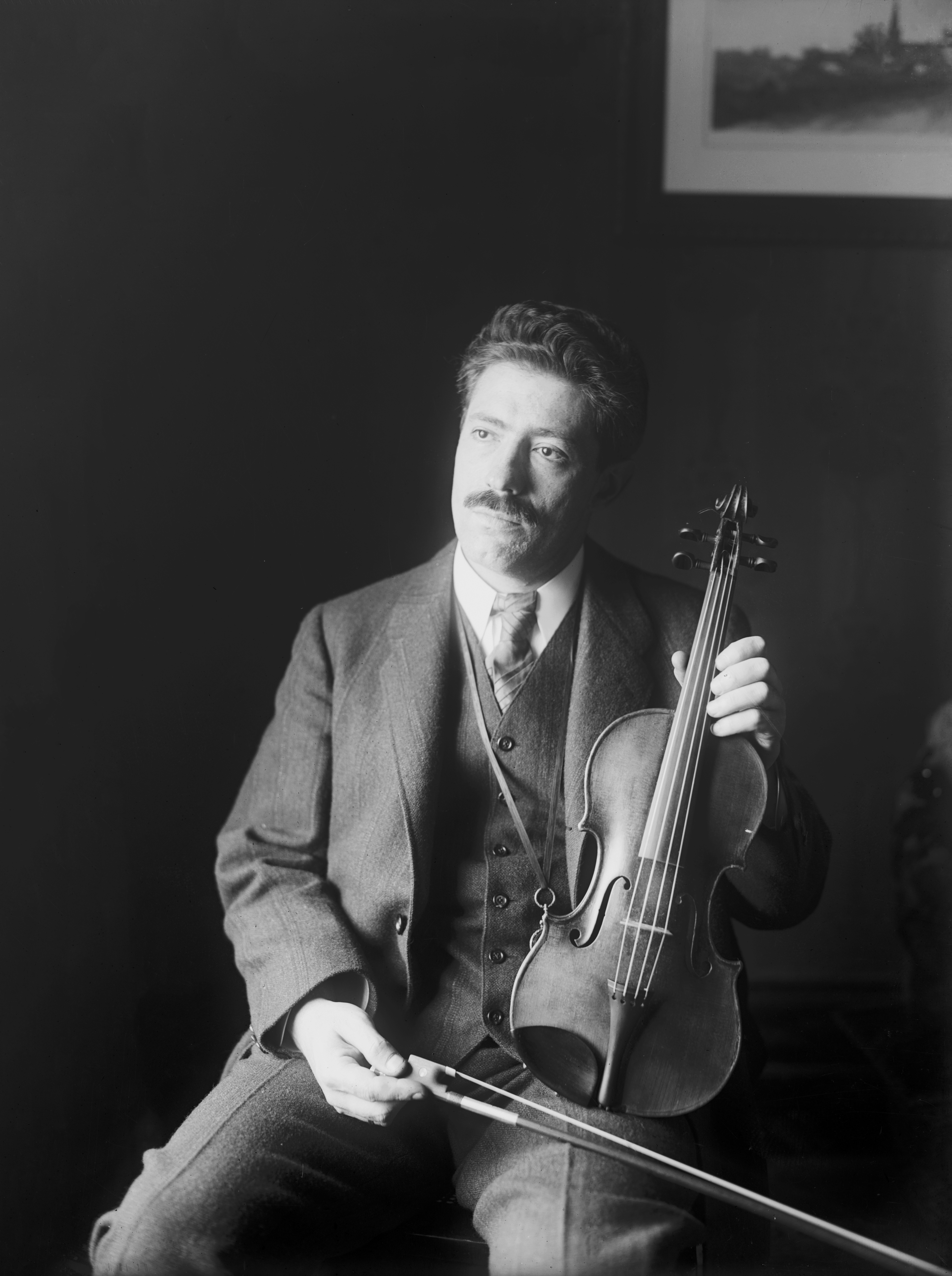
Fritz Kreisler

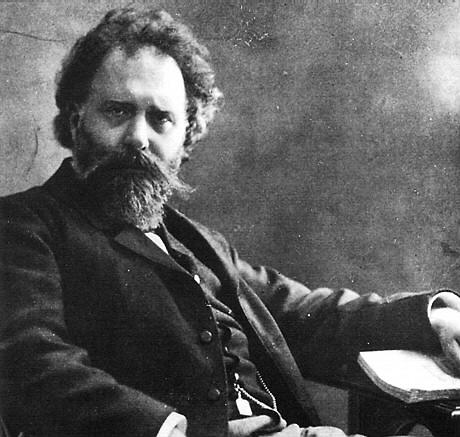
Wilhelm Kienzl

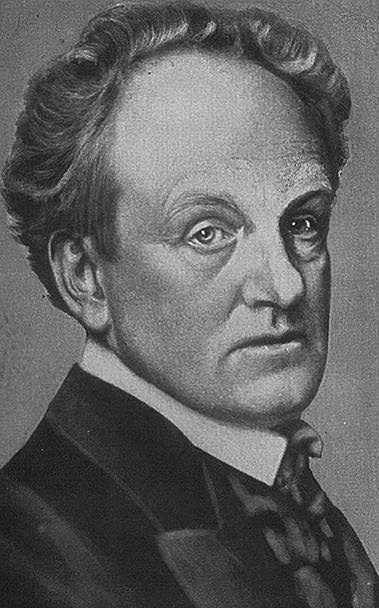
Gerhart Hauptmann

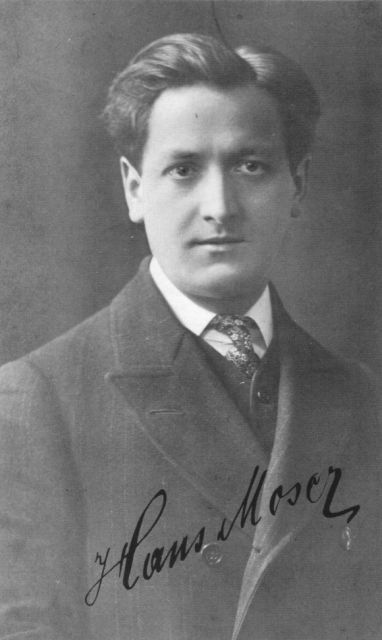
Hans Moser

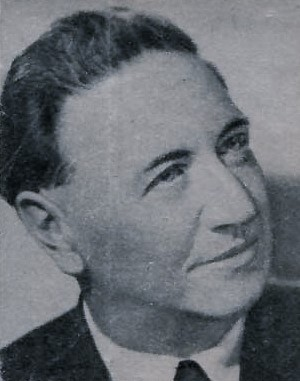
Franz Salmhofer

| Name | Year |
|---|---|
| Ludwig Lazar Basch | 1925 |
| August Sauer | 1925 |
| Gustav Grünhut | 1926 |
| Regina Kreidl | 1927 |
| Franz Bucher | 1928 |
| Alois Seidl | 1928 |
| Leo Salkind | 1928 |
| Hugo Lex | 1928 |
| Ignaz Hörnisch | 1928 |
| Max Devrient | 1928 |
| Hans Wielander | 1928 |
| Josef Zuleger | 1929 |
| Leopold Gröber | 1929 |
| Johann Gstier | 1929 |
| Josef Harthan | 1929 |
| Karl Merten | 1929 |
| Julius Schmid | 1929 |
| Anton Schmidt | 1929 |
| Franz Reidinger | 1929 |
| Wilhelm Schubert | 1929 |
| Josef Schaffer | 1929 |
| Alois Nesswetha | 1929 |
| Leopold Nowak | 1929 |
| Franz Junghofer | 1929 |
| Josef Kalous | 1929 |
| Franz Dirnhofer | 1929 |
| Friedrich Feiler | 1929 |
| Anton Fiedler | 1929 |
| Johann Fritschek | 1929 |
| Karl Fuhrmann | 1929 |
| Heinrich Karl Ohrfandl | 1930 |
| Rudolf Kalmar | 1931 |
| Josef Seyfried | 1931 |
| Leopold Langer | 1931 |
| Clemens Krauss | 1932 |
| Johann Schulteis | 1933 |
| Armin Tyroler | 1933 |
| Fritz Kreisler | 1935 |
| Arturo Toscanini | 1935 |
| Johann Ganglberger | 1936 |
| Hans Sperl | 1936 |
| Ludwig Karpath | 1936 |
| Siegfried Türkel | 1936 |
| Otto Tressler | 1937 |
| Hans von Voltelini | 1937 |
| Wilhelm Kienzl | 1937 |
| Lotte Medelsky | 1937 |
| Carl Zeska | 1937 |
| Viktor Keldorfer | 1938 |
| Josef Reiter | 1938 |
| Richard Waldemar | 1939 |
| Kamillo Andreas Horn | 1940 |
| Franz Lehár | 1940 |
| Ferdinand Andri | 1941 |
| Franz Karl Ginzkey | 1941 |
| Max von Millenkovich | 1941 |
| Rudolf Bacher | 1942 |
| Robert Ley | 1942 |
| Max Mell | 1942 |
| Joseph Marx | 1942 |
| Gerhart Hauptmann | 1942 |
| Josef Weinheber | 1942 |
| Hedwig Bleibtreu | 1943 |
| Hermann Göring | 1943 |
| Ernst Kaltenbrunner | 1943 |
| Hermann Neubacher | 1943 |
| Walther Funk | 1944 |
| Walter Nowotny | 1944 |
| Hans Pfitzner | 1944 |
| Hugo Thimig | 1944 |
| Raoul Aslan | 1946 |
| Georg Wilhelm Pabst | 1948 |
| Robert Maria Prosl | 1948 |
| Heinrich Schedl | 1948 |
| Rudolf Sieczyński | 1948 |
| Johann Witzmann | 1948 |
| Michael Rabenlechner | 1948 |
| Edmund Eysler | 1949 |
| Edwin Rollett | 1949 |
| Ludwig Gruber | 1950 |
| Karl Stemolak | 1950 |
| Oscar Straus | 1950 |
| Hans Moser | 1950 |
| Ferdinand Bruckner | 1951 |
| Erich Tschermak-Seysenegg | 1951 |
| Eduard Heinl | 1951 |
| Hans Spitzy | 1952 |
| Wolfgang Denk | 1952 |
| Alfons Dopsch | 1953 |
| Felix Braun | 1955 |
| Clemens Holzmeister | 1955 |
| Franz Theodor Csokor | 1955 |
| Richard Meister | 1956 |
| Josef Luitpold Stern | 1956 |
| Karl von Frisch | 1957 |
| Bruno Walter | 1956 |
| Albert Paris Gütersloh | 1957 |
| Paul Schebesta | 1957 |
| Ewald Balser | 1958 |
| Leopold Schönbauer | 1958 |
| Anton Rohrhofer | 1958 |
| Werner Krauss | 1959 |
| Otto Rommel | 1960 |
| Alfred Verdross-Drossberg | 1960 |
| Karl Wolff | 1960 |
| Arnold Pillat | 1961 |
| Josef Krips | 1962 |
| Lotte Lehmann | 1963 |
| Hans Thirring | 1963 |
| Emil Karl Blümml | 1964 |
| Herbert Boeckl | 1964 |
| Karl Böhm | 1964 |
| Tassilo Antoine | 1965 |
| Hubert Kunz | 1965 |
| Lorenz Böhler | 1965 |
| Heimito von Doderer | 1966 |
| Martin Gusinde | 1966 |
| Hans Kelsen | 1966 |
| Rudolf Egger | 1967 |
| Rudolf Henz | 1967 |
| Richard Neutra | 1967 |
| Maria Jeritza | 1967 |
| Karl Fellinger | 1969 |
| Helene Thimig | 1969 |
| Rudolf Kalmar junior | 1970 |
| Franz Salmhofer | 1970 |
| Ernst Krenek | 1970 |
| Albin Lesky | 1971 |
| Carl Zuckmayer | 1971 |
| Erich Schmid | 1971 |
| Fritz Hochwälder | 1972 |
| Johannes Messner | 1972 |
| Hans Swarowsky | 1974 |
| Anna Freud | 1975 |
| Eduard Schrack | 1975 |
| Rudolf Gamsjäger | 1976 |
| Leopold Breitenecker | 1977 |
| Fred Hennings | 1977 |
| Paul Hörbiger | 1977 |
| Johann Navratil | 1979 |
| Viktor E. Frankl | 1980 |
| Ernst Haeussermann | 1981 |
| Hans Thimig | 1981 |
| Hermann Thimig | 1981 |
| Hans Jaray | 1981 |
| Leonard Bernstein | 1982 |
| Egon Seefehlner | 1982 |
| Hans Weigel | 1982 |
| Paula Wessely | 1982 |
| Käthe Gold | 1982 |
| Friedrich August von Hayek | 1983 |
| Josef Meinrad | 1983 |
| Karl Popper | 1983 |
| Manès Sperber | 1983 |
| Peter Alexander | 1984 |
| Franz Stoss | 1984 |
| Karl Dönch | 1985 |
| Carry Hauser | 1985 |
| Roland Rainer | 1985 |
| Marcel Prawy | 1986 |
| Leonie Rysanek | 1986 |
| Hansl Schmid | 1986 |
| Paul Hoffmann | 1987 |
| György Ligeti | 1987 |
| Fritz Eckhardt | 1989 |
| Friedrich Gulda | 1989 |
| Peter Ludwig | 1989 |
| Josef Bandion | 1990 |
| Walter Spiel | 1990 |
| Teddy Kollek | 1991 |
| Claudio Abbado | 1994 |
| Plácido Domingo | 1994 |
| Udo Jürgens | 1994 |
| Carl Szokoll | 1995 |
| Hans Carl Artmann | 1996 |
| Robert Jungbluth | 1997 |
| Margarete Schütte-Lihotzky | 1997 |
| Otto Schenk | 1997 |
| Hans Hotter | 1998 |
| Johannes Heesters | 1999 |
| Fritz Muliar | 1999 |
| Harry Zohn | 1999 |
| Heinz von Foerster | 2001 |
| Erika Weinzierl | 2001 |
| Leon Zelman | 2001 |
| Werner Welzig | 2002 |
| Joe Zawinul | 2002 |
| Josef Mikl | 2004 |
| Friederike Mayröcker | 2004 |
