= Federal Theatre =

Federal Theatre may refer to:

- Federal Theatre (Austria)
- Federal Theatre (Los Angeles)
- Federal Theatre Project
