= Der Fels =

Der Fels (English: The Rock) was group of German Expressionist artists that existed from around 1920 to 1927.

== History ==
The group's origins lay in the meeting of Franz Bronstert, Fritz Fuhrken and Georg Philipp Wörlen in a World War I prisoner of war camp in Ripon, England. Other members of the group were Reinhard Hilker and the Austrian Carry Hauser. Wörlen, who was significantly older than the other members, was the driving force. At their last joint exhibition Fritz Stuckenberg also took part. All the group's artists were later condemned by the National Socialist government as entartet ("degenerate").

Der Fels published a series of eight portfolios of prints (Verlag Krieg, Leipzig). The first one also contained a manifesto by Heinz Klapproth:

"Do you see things as they are? Form is disguise, deception. Things are not as you think you see them! Therefore become still and simple, because you are looking with your eyes and seeing only the surface. The artist fights titanic battles to win the souls of things, to penetrate to their depths, to vanquish the surface. The result of this is EXPRESSION - and this is what unites the people of the Fels."

== Selection of group exhibitions ==
- 1921: Hagen, Museum Folkwang
- 1921: Hagen, Kunst-Kabinett Kollock
- 1921: Landesmuseum Münster
- 1922: Bremen, Graphisches Kabinett Fedelhören
- 1922: Kunsthalle Düsseldorf
- 1922: Kunsthalle Bremerhaven
- 1922: Hamburg, Kunstsalon Maria Kunde (Graphik)
- 1922: Salzburg, Moderne Galerie (Staatsgalerie)
- 1922: Pfalzgalerie Kaiserslautern
- 1922: Berlin, Kunstsalon Heller
- 1923: Werkbundhaus Essen
- 1923: Barmer Ruhmeshalle
- 1923: Oldenburg, Kunstsalon Lappan
- 1923: Ulm, Hermelin-Verlag
- 1923: Kunsthalle Kiel
- 1923: Kunsthalle Barmen
- 1924: Landesmuseum Münster
- 1924: Städtisches Museum Elberfeld (Von der Heydt-Museum)
- 1925: Städtisches Museum Gelsenkirchen (Kunstmuseum Gelsenkirchen)
- 1926: Vienna, Kunstsalon Würthle
- 1926: Eisenach, Kunstsalon Messing
- 1927: Städtische Gemäldegalerie Bochum (Museum Bochum – Kunstsammlung)
- 1991: Passau, Museum Moderner Kunst (retrospective)

== Sources ==
- Otto Breicha, Franz X. Hofer and Franz Theodor Csokor: Der Fels, Künstlergemeinschaft, 1921–1927, Stiftung Wörlen, Passau 1991, ISBN 3-9802307-9-1 (Museumskatalog, Landstrich; Nr. 15)
