= Franz Bronstert =

German engineer and painter

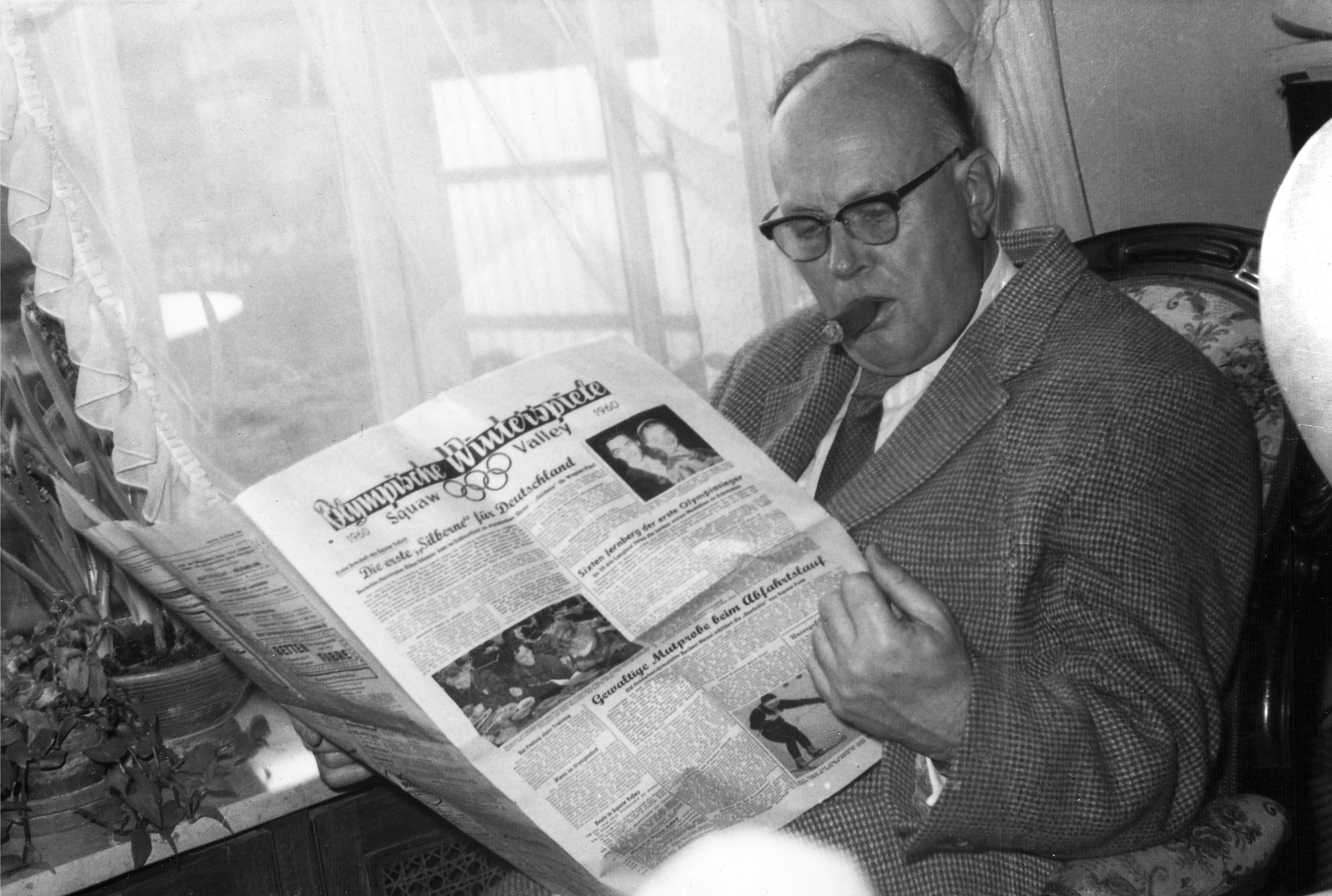
Franz Bronstert 1960

Franz Bronstert (18 February 1895 – 29 October 1967) was a German engineer and painter.

== Life and art ==
Franz Bronstert was born to the teacher for arts and music Bernhard Bronstert and his wife Luise (from the Breil-family, an organ-builder dynasty) in Dorsten. Before World War I Bronstert visited and finished the superior school for engineers in Hagen. He served during the war in the rank of Lieutenant and later „Rittmeister" equivalent to Captain. As a prisoner of war at Ripon, Yorkshire he got into contact with artists Fritz Fuhrken and Georg Philipp Wörlen and started with his own artistic work. These contacts led to the foundation of the group of artists „Der Fels" (The Rock) which was later completed by Reinhard Hilker and Carry Hauser.

Past the war he settled in Hagen and made contact with the group around collector Karl Ernst Osthaus especially with Christian Rohlfs. The latter influenced the work of Bronstert considerably. During this time a life-time friendship with Alfred Kubin developed. Membership in „Der Fels" led to numerous exhibitions all over Germany and Austria between 1921 and 1927. Eight portfolios with original prints of "Der Fels" were also published during this time.

His participation in exhibitions of Das Junge Rheinland(Young Rhineland) is also known of as well as participation in the group exhibition of Hagenring at Museum Osnabrück 1929.

Bronstert’s art developed from radical expressionism of the early twenties to a realistic phase and finally to a reformed impressionism as the artist claims himself. Bronstert finds his motifs mostly in nature.

Even though Bronstert mastered several techniques, like oil painting, drawing, woodcut it was the watercolour painting that he loved most.

As the financial success was not sufficient to feed a family, Bronstert had married Maria Regina Hedwig Schlickum, a relative of painter Carl Schlickum and writer Ferdinand Freiligrath; he took up a job as an engineer without stopping to paint. Four children were born subsequently. The possibility to work as an artist without financial pressure was the reason behind Bronsterts refusal to market himself.

Bronstert was both a technical and artistic talent. He was successful in his job and was a member of the board of VARTA with several international patents on his record when he retired. Past retirement he concentrated solely on his art again.

Works by Bronstert can be found in the Schneider Collection, Museum Baden, Solingen; in the collections of Karl Ernst Osthaus-Museum in Hagen; in the Museum Schloss Moyland, in the Von der Heydt-Museum, Wuppertal, in the Bavarian State Painting Collections, Munich, and in the art museums of Soest, Germany, Iserlohn, and Lüdenscheid as well as in private collections.

Bronstert died at Freudenberg (Baden) in 1967.

== Selection of exhibitions ==
- 1921–1927 rotating exhibition „Der Fels", in many cities of Germany and Austria
- 1929 Museum Osnabrück: group exhibition „Hagenring"
- 1966 Gallery Lempertz Contempora, Cologne „Baukhage Bronstert Cordone Venema"
- 1991 Museum of Modern Art, Passau „Der Fels"
- 2006 Amtshaus Gallery, Freudenberg „Franz Bronstert - Ein Künstler der klassischen Moderne"
- 2008 City Museum Lüdenscheid „Nature viewed by painters and photographers"

== See also ==
- List of German painters
