= Ilse Bernheimer =

Austrian painter (1892–1985)

Ilse Bernheimer (born March 20, 1892, in Vienna, Austria-Hungary; died February 28, 1985, in Venice) was an Austrian painter, graphic artist, interior designer, and teacher.

== Early life ==
Born on March 20, 1892, Bernheimer's parents were Hermine Bernheimer, née Margulies (1864-1944) and the chemist Oskar Bernheimer (1858-1950). Elisabeth and Marianne Leisching were her cousins. In 1906 Ilse Bernheimer started studying with Franz Strohofer and Franz Čižek in their junior art classes. At the age of 16, she was allowed to participate in the youth section of the 1908 Vienna Art Show with 30 watercolors. From 1908 to 1910, she was a guest student at the Vienna School of Applied Arts or Kunstgewerbeschule and in 1911 attended the school full time. From 1911 to 1916 she studied painting with Kolo Moser, ornamental form with Franz Čižek, and Anton von Kenner and his assistant Oskar Kokoschka. Bernheimer also taught Francesco Grimaldi as a young artist. In 1928 she furnished two houses at the Kunslerhaus Wien, designed by Viennese architect Anton Brenner.

In 1913 she helped prepare for the International Women's Suffrage Conference in Vienna.

== Nazi persecution ==
In 1938 after the Anschluss, she fled with her parents to Italy. They went into hiding in Rome in 1943.

== Postwar ==
From 1950 she lived in Venice, where she taught from 1952 at the Zanetti Glass School on Murano. She died in 1985.

Her work has been featured in recent exhibitions, such as the "City of Women - Female Artists in Wien during the years 1900 - 1938" at the Belvedere in Vienna in 2019.

== Memberships ==
- Österreichischer Werkbund
- Vereinigung bildender Künstlerinnen Österreichs

== Exhibitions ==
- 1908: Kunstschau
- 1920, 1928: Hagenbund
- 1922, 1976: Biennale Venedig
- 1928: Weihnachtsschau, Künstlerhaus Wien
- 1932: 17. Jahresausstellung der Vereinigung bildender Künstlerinnen Österreichs, Hagenbund
- 1966: Galerie Nagel
- 1970: Instituto Austriaco di Cultura, Rom
- 1982: Hochschule für Angewandte Kunst, Wien

Posthumous

- 2019: "Stadt der Frauen"
- 2021: "Die Frauen der Wiener Werkstätte." MAK – Museum für angewandte Kunst

== Writings ==
- Arbeiten in der Kunstgewerbeschule, Wien : Hochschule für Angewandte Kunst, 1982

== Literature ==
- Wien um 1900, Kunst und Kultur, (Ausstellungskatalog) Wien 1985, S. 497
- Rudolf Schmidt: Österreichisches Künstlerlexikon, Bd. 1, Wien 1980
- (in German) Dankmar Trier: Bernheimer, Ilse. In: Allgemeines Künstlerlexikon. Die Bildenden Künstler aller Zeiten und Völker (AKL). Band 9, Saur, München u. a. 1994, ISBN 3-598-22749-3, S. 599 (abweichende biografische Daten)
- Veronika Volz: Nach Italien emigriert – drei Künstlerinnen und Künstler, (Walter Franke, Ilse Bernheimer, Maria Likarz-Strauß), in: Zwischenwelt. Zeitschrift für Kultur des Exils und des Widerstands (22), 1/2, 2005, S. 61–65.
- Christoph Thun-Hohenstein, Anne-Katrin Rossberg, Elisabeth Schmuttermeier (Hrsg.): Die Frauen der Wiener Werkstätte. MAK, Wien und Birkhäuser Verlag, Basel 2020, S. 207. ISBN 978-3-0356-2211-9
