= Meidling =

Coordinates: 48°09′42″N 16°19′18″E

Meidling Meidling (Bavarian)
- 12th District of Vienna
- Coat of arms

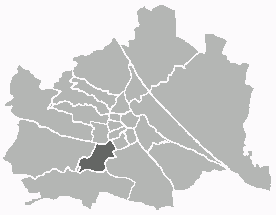
- Location of the district within Vienna
- Country: Austria
- City: Vienna

Government
  - District Director: Gabriele Votava (SPÖ)
  - First Deputy: Peter Kovar (SPÖ)
  - Second Deputy: Ingrid Madejski (FPÖ)
  - Representation (54 Members): SPÖ 25, FPÖ 11, Green 10, ÖVP 5, NEOS 4, KPÖ 3, Pro Hetzendorf 1

Area
  - Total: 8.21 km^{2} (3.17 sq mi)

Population (2016-01-01)
  - Total: 94,179
  - Density: 11,500/km^{2} (29,700/sq mi)
- Postal code: A-1120
- Address of District Office: Schönbrunner Straße 259; A-1120 Wien
- Website: www.wien.gv.at/bezirke/meidling/

Meidling (German pronunciation: [ˈmaɪtlɪŋ]) is the 12th district of Vienna (German: 12. Bezirk, Meidling). It is located just southwest of the central districts, south of the River Wien, west of the Gürtel belt, and east and southeast of Schönbrunn Palace. Meidling is a heavily populated urban area with many residential buildings, but also large recreational areas and parks. In sports, it is represented by the FC Dynamo Meidling. Former Chancellor of Austria Sebastian Kurz was born and raised in Meidling and his private residence is there.

== Geography ==
=== Location ===
The 12th District lies in southwest Vienna, about 5–10 km (3.1–6.2 mi) from the Innere Stadt. It stretches from Wiental south of the River Wien in the region between the Wienerberg hill in the 10th District and the Grünen Berg hill, part of Schönbrunn Palace, in the 13th District.

=== District parts ===
The former suburb, after which the "Meidlinger L" of the South-Vienna dialect is named, consists of two parts:

- a heavily developed workers section, closer to the downtown area (Obermeidling, Untermeidling and Gaudenzdorf);
- and a loose joint area (and Altmannsdorf Hetzendorf), to the southwest. The latter is a mixed industrial and residential area to the Valley of the Liesing, where the compound structure of the 23rd District continues. In between, are the foothills of the mountain with its Viennese geologically young beach terraces and brick pits.

Besides the Katastralgemeinden of Altmannsdorf, Gaudenzdorf, Hetzendorf and Meidling (Obermeidling and Untermeidling), there are also small areas of the Katastralgemeinden Atzgersdorf, Inzersdorf and Inzersdorf City in the Meidlinger district area.

A breakdown of the district area is also in the Zählbezirken official statistics, in which the municipality Zählsprengel combined. The eleven census-districts in Meidling are: Gaudenzdorf, Fuchsenfeld, Meidlinger Friedhof, Wilhelmsdorf, Meidlinger Hauptstraße, Tivoligasse, Gatterhölzl, Oswaldgasse, Am Schöpfwerk, Altmannsdorf und Hetzendorf. Despite partial name similarity, the boundaries of the census-districts do not match those of each Katastralgemeinde.

=== Land use ===
The developed area of Meidling includes 54.3% (33.3% Vienna-wide) of the area of the district. The space itself is distributed as 69.0% to 9.7%, for residential areas versus total area of cultural, religious, or sports venues (devoted to public purposes). This relatively high figure is compared to one for a Viennese township as a very low proportion of farmland (4.3% of the area to be developed).

Greenspace in Hietzing takes in a share of 18.2%. The proportion of traffic areas in the district region is, with 27.5%, typical for central Vienna.

Space allocation in 2003
Builtspace			Greenspace						Water	Transport areas
443.1			148.3						–	224.2
Residences	Oper- ations	Public Facilities	Farms	Parks	Forests	Meadows	Small gardens	Rec. areas		
305.8	94.	43.1	-	-	-	-	-	-		

== History ==
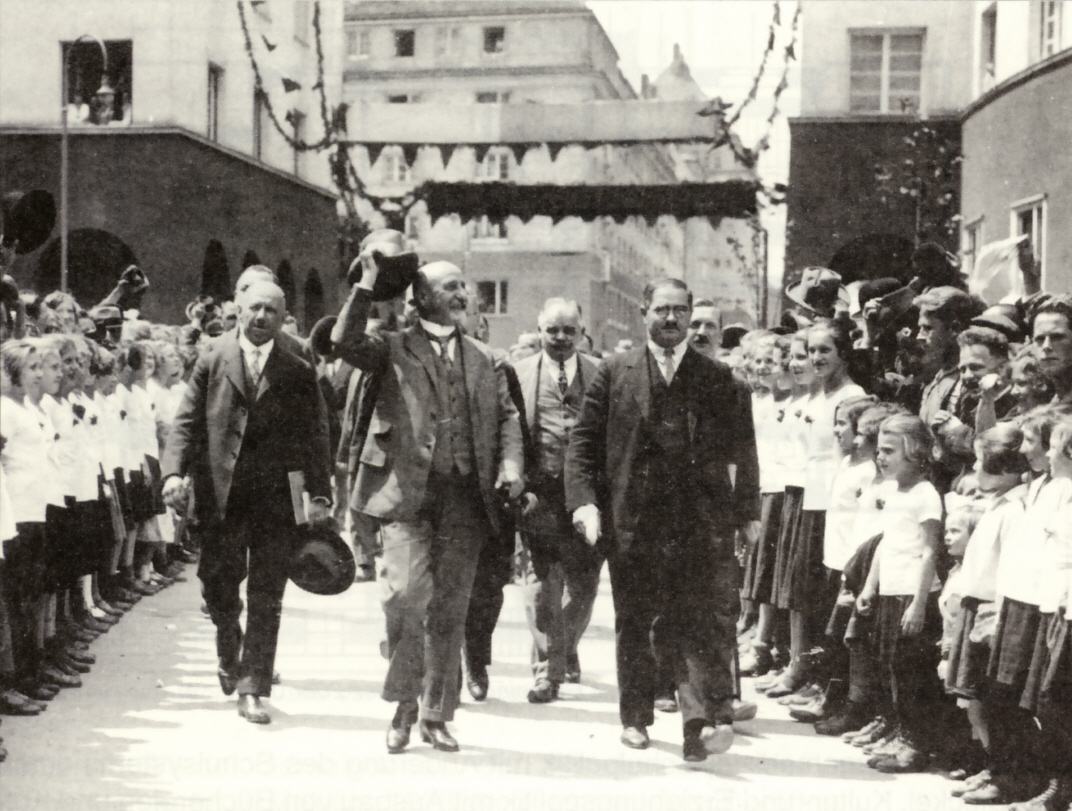
Karl Seitz visiting a housing scheme in Meidling, 1926

Meidling, as a district of Vienna, was founded in 1892. It consists of five former villages: Obermeidling, Untermeidling, Gaudenzdorf, Hetzendorf and Altmannsdorf. Obermeidling and Untermeidling were one village called Meidling until 1806, when they were divided. Altmannsdorf still has its rural character.

The place Altmannsdorf was mentioned for the first time in 1314 and had a rural character for a long time. In 1190 was the first written mention of Hetzendorf, after which Henricus von Hetzendorf received it as a feudal village. Later, it came into possession of the Klosterneuburg Abbey and the German Knights Order. In the 18th century, the site developed into a residential colony.

The settlement at Meidling had been documented under the name "Murlingen" since the year 1104. Originally, the area belonged as a large part of the Klosterneuburg Abbey. In the Middle Ages, mainly farms and vineyards were operated in Meidling.

In 1755, a sulphurous source was discovered, whereupon the area and Theresienbad became a popular destination for the Viennese. At the end of the 18th century, more and more industry established itself, changing the character of the place totally. This led in 1806, to the division of the community, already quite large, into Obermeidling (upper) and Untermeidling (lower). In Untermeidling, a separate settlement developed on the former brickworks site, which was detached in 1846 under the name Wilhelmsdorf. In 1819, the suburb Gaudenzdorf had emerged along the current Vienna Belt, in which, because of the situation in Vienna, numerous dyers, tanners and launderers settled.

On 1 January 1892, all these communities were united to the 12th Viennese community district, Meidling. As a consequence, it became a typical worker district. In the area of the Vienna Belt, many community buildings emerged in the 1920s. The zones of Hetzendorf and Altmannsdorf remained rurally stamped to be sure, but expanded dwelling plants emerged there also, after the Second World War.

== Population ==
Historical population
Year	Pop.	±%
1869	30,589	—
1880	47,358	+54.8%
1890	57,782	+22.0%
1900	72,354	+25.2%
1910	106,531	+47.2%
1923	97,534	−8.4%
1934	109,538	+12.3%
1939	99,305	−9.3%
1951	83,743	−15.7%
1961	89,854	+7.3%
1971	85,500	−4.8%
1981	79,404	−7.1%
1991	79,610	+0.3%
2001	78,270	−1.7%
2011	88,503	+13.1%
2021	97,578	+10.3%
Source: Censuses

In 1869, the current area covered by the Meidling district consisted of only about 31,000 inhabitants. By the 1892 incorporation, the population had already doubled, through the continuous influx of people to Vienna and the surrounding community. The population growth continued until the beginning of the Great War, so the district, in 1910, contained 106.531 inhabitants. After a slight decline after the First World War, the district reached 109,538 inhabitants in 1934, as its highest population. As a result, the population figures stabilized, after a brief recovery during the 1960s, in the 1980s at a value of just under 80,000 inhabitants. Only after the turn of the millennium, did the district population in Vienna citywide trend to grow. At the beginning of 2007, the population stood at 85,099 people.

=== Population structure ===
The age of the population of Meidlinger in 2001, compared to Vienna citywide, was roughly average. The percentage of children under 15 years was 14.8% in the total area (Vienna: 14.7%). Also, the percentage of the population from 15 to 59 years stood at 63.0% (Vienna: 63.6%), in the average range. The number of people aged 60 or more, in 2007, was 18,662 or 21.7% (Vienna: 21.7%). The gender distribution in the district area was 47.9% men and 52.1% women. The number of Meidlingers married was a share of 40.7%, compared to Vienna's 41.2%, only slightly below the average of Vienna.

=== Origin and language ===
The proportion of foreign district residents in 2005 was 20.2% (Vienna: 18.7%), and points to 2001 (16.5%) as in the entire state a rising trend. The highest proportion of foreigners in 2005 represented approximately 5.7% share of the district population nationals from Serbia and Montenegro. Other 3.1% were Turkish, Bosnian 1.5%, 1.4% Somali and 1.2% Croatian citizens. 24.4% of the population of Meidling in 2001 weren't born in Austria. 7.7% of the inhabitants could speak Serbian, 5.9% Turkish and 2.7% Croatian. [7] [8]

=== Religious preferences ===
The religion of the population in the Meidling district in 2001 largely on average, of Vienna, although the proportion of residents with the Roman Catholic confession with just under 47.0% above the community average of 49.2% was. There are eight in the municipality of Roman Catholic parishes, the city Deanery 12 images. On the other hand, the proportion of people with Islamic beliefs with 9.5% and the proportion of population with Orthodox confession with 7.2% above the average. The percentage of Protestant believers stood at 4.1%, 25.8% belonged to any religious community. Other 6.4% had no religion or another confession given, [7]

== Politics ==
District Governors since 1945
Elias Terlecki (KPÖ)	1945–1946
August Fürst (SPÖ)	1946–1959
Wilhelm Hradil (SPÖ)	1959–1976
Kurt Neiger (SPÖ)	1976–1991
Franz Rupaner (SPÖ)	1991–1995
Herbert Hezucky (SPÖ)	1995–2003
Gabriele Votava (SPÖ)	2003–

As a working-class district, Meidling is politically traditionally dominated by the SPÖ, which has determined the governor of the district since 1946. Often the SPÖ in Meidling has also reached the absolute majority of votes. The ÖVP were the second strongest party in Meidling from 1946 until 1991, when the FPÖ became the second most popular party. In 1996, after a gain of 8.5%, the FPÖ won the majority of votes from the SPÖ. However, the FPÖ lost all of their gains at the elections in 2001, and even fell below the results of 1991. This decline continued in 2005, although to a lesser extent. The FPÖ barely received more votes than the ÖVP, and the FPÖ slid to a 15.5% vote share. The SPÖ in 2005 regained the absolute majority of votes. The Greens, who became increasingly popular from 1991 to 2005, were by 2005 only just behind the FPÖ and ÖVP.

District representation 1991–2010
Year	SPÖ	ÖVP	FPÖ	Grüne	LIF	BZÖ	Others
1991	50.9	17.2	21.5	7.7	n.k	-	2.7
1996	39.9	14.0	28.7	8.3	6.6	-	2.5
2001	48.6	14.3	19.9	11.2	2.5	-	3.5
2005	50.9	15.5	15.5	13.1	0.5	1.2	3.3
2010	44.4	11.4	25.4	13.0	0.7	1.1	3.9

== Coat of arms ==
Arms of Meidling.

The coat of arms of the Meidling district consists of five parts. The heart sign in the center represents the district-part of Untermeidling. It shows the growing waves nymph with silver, blue decorated cans. It would therefore emphasize the importance of the Vienna River and the springs out of the area. Below is a rectangular, Roman altar stone, the 1853 has been found. The upper left part shows the coat of arms of St. John of Nepomuk, the patron saint of the parish church as represents the district part Gaudenzdorf. He faces a silvery blue bridge on foot. Since John Nepomuk is the patron saint against floods, he serves as a reminder of the historical threat to the area from the River Wien. The right upper part of coat of arms is part of the district Hetzendorf and shows the cross of the Teutonic Order. This was the basic rule of the territory from 1456 inne. The lower left part of the coat of arms is part of the district Obermeidling. It shows in the upper part of a golden wheel as a symbol of the former mills situated here. Below is a green hill with the symbol of the Crescent and a golden star for the six former importance of viticulture. The lower right part is finally Crest for the District of part Altmannsdorf. It shows a black raven with a golden ring in its beak. This represents the King Oswald of Northumbria, the patron saint of parish Altmannsdorfer. The coat of arms of Altmannsdorf can also be found at the house Khleslplatz 2, but this coat of arms has been weathered.

== Dialect ==
The "Meidlinger L" is a specialty of the German working-class dialect spoken in Vienna (see Viennese German). It refers to the letter "l" spoken as "dl" (as in Meidling, hence the name) in some variants of the Viennese dialect. Some believe that this feature of the dialect has its origin in Czech, where the 'l' sometimes sounds similar, e.g. in the past tense.

== Sights ==
=== Sacred buildings ===
- Hetzendorf Church ( "Church of the Rosary"), neuromanisch with three paintings by Ernst Fuchs
- Hölzl Gate Church, an unusual round of Ladislav Hruska (1959)
- Altmannsdorfer Church on Khleslplatz, the oldest church in Meidling (1838/39)
- Immaculate Conception Church (1949–53) by Helene Koller Book Wieser and Hans Stein Eder
- The name of Jesus Church (1950) by Josef Vytiska
- Monastery Church of the Cross Sisters in Murlingengasse
- Marianneum in Hetzendorf
- Meidlinger Pfarrkirche St. John of Nepomuk, Migazziplatz
- Maria Lourdes in the Haschkagasse
- Am Schöpfwerk Church
- Church of the Way, Protestant parish Hetzendorf
- Schieferlkreuz
- William Dorfer Chapel
- Anne Chapel, also known as Chapel Sageder

=== Castles and villas ===
- Castle Altmannsdorf (Schloss Altmannsdorf) – houses the Renner Institute, a training center of the SPÖ
- Castle Hetzendorf (Schloss Hetzendorf) – houses the Fashion School of the City of Vienna
- Springer Schlössl – now a hotel of the ÖVP seminar, was built in 1887 by the contractors of Fellner and Helmer.

=== Large public buildings ===
- Vienna rail station Meidling (Bahnhof Wien Meidling)
- Meidlinger Train barracks (Meidlinger Trainkaserne)
- Theresienbad – Theresa Spa

=== Residential and industrial buildings ===
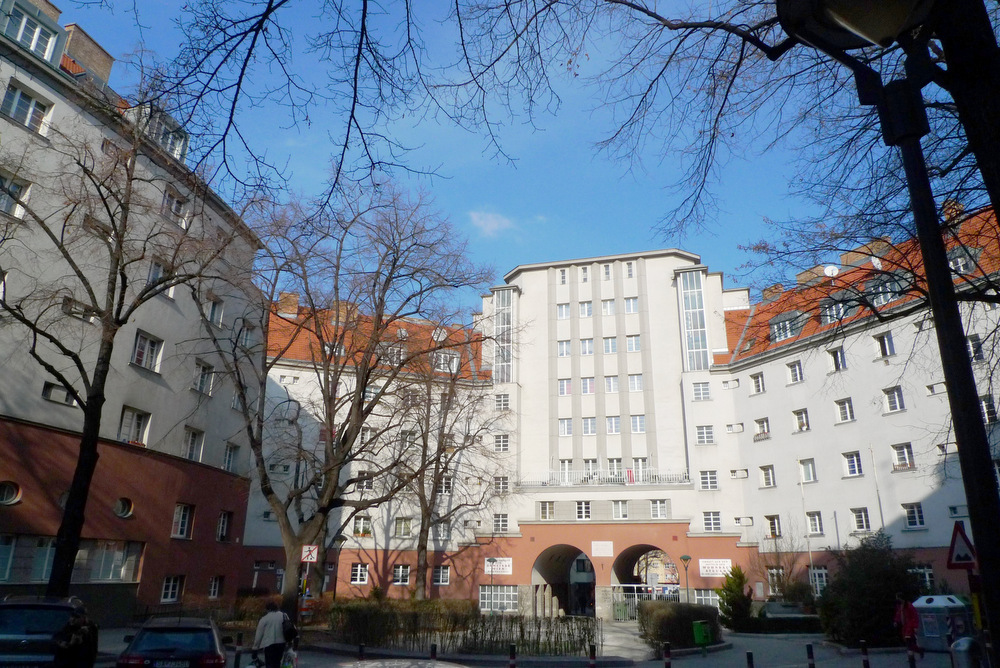
Reismannhof, 2012

- Residential Building Fuchsenfeldhof (1921–24) by Heinrich Schmid and Hermann Aichinger
- Residential Building Reismannhof (1924–25) by Heinrich Schmid and Hermann Aichinger
- Residential Building Bebelhof (1925/26) by Karl Ehn
- Residential complex Am Wienerberg (1925–27) by Rudolf Perco et al.
- Residential Building Liebknechthof (1926–27) by Karl Krist
- Residential Building Lorenshof (1927–28) of Otto Prutscher
- Residential complex Am Tivoli (1927–28) by Wilhelm Peterle
- Residential Building Simonyhof (1927–28) of Leopold Simony
- Residential Building Fröhlichhof (1928–29) by Engelbert Mang
- Residential Building Haydnhof (1928–29) by August Hauser
- Residential Building Indianerhof (1929–31) by Camillo Fritz Discher und Karl Dirnhuber
- Residential Building Leopoldine-Glöckel-Hof (1931–32) by Josef Frank (named in honour of Leopoldine Glöckel)
- Residential complex Am Schöpfwerk (1976–80) by Viktor Hufnagl
- Kabelwerk Wien-Meidling (2005–2010), a former cable production company

=== Museums ===
The District Museum of Meidling (Bezirksmuseum Meidling) is the oldest museum in Vienna. It was founded in 1923 as a Meidlinger Heimatmuseum and sets its priorities, including in the field of crafts, of everyday life and the composer Carl Lorens and Hermann Leopoldi. The Heizungsmuseum of the City of Vienna provides heating, 19th century to the present from. In the same building is the Viennese School Museum, the different class facilities from the 20th century. The fashion is not publicly accessible collection of the Vienna museum has an inventory of over 20,000 exhibits with a focus on women's clothing in the 19th and 20th century. The attached special library is open to the public. The Old Vienna Schnapps Museum is available for visits on request.

=== Parks and cemeteries ===
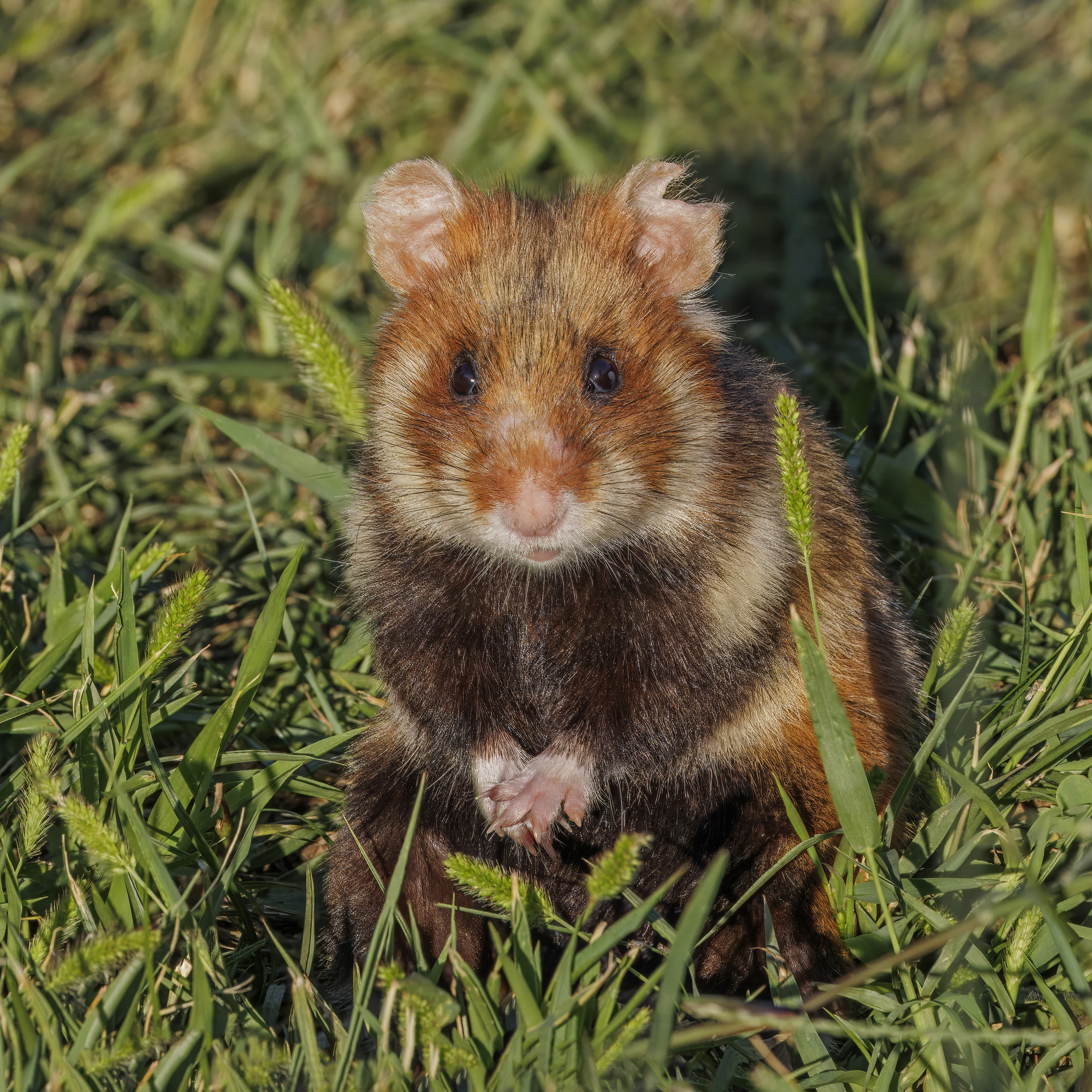
European hamster in the Meidling cemetery

The largest park in the district area is Haydnpark, with around 26,500 m^{2} surface. The park is located on the grounds of the former Hundsturmer cemetery, which closed 1874 and was opened as park in 1926. From the original cemetery, only the tombstone of the composer Joseph Haydn remains. Approximately half the size is the Wilhelmsdorf park, which was named for its lake at Deckergasse and Deckerpark.

Back in 1909 there was a small public green space, according to the resolution of a stock of rail lines around 1980 Vienna expanded and 1990 has been redesigned. Nearby is the roughly the same size stone farm park, between the Längenfeldgasse Malfattigasse and the lies and 2003 after the establishment of the People's garage was reopened. A similarly large area includes the city Gaudenzdorfergürtel Wilderness, a ruderal belt between the Vienna and the left Wienzeile.

At the district on the border with Hietzing Green Mountain is the Marillenalm, a natural, largely wooded park, which also includes fruit trees. Smaller parks are: Theresienbad (Theresienbadpark und Christine-Busta-Park) and at the Arnethstraße (Hermann-Leopoldi-Park). The Hermann-Leopoldi-Park provides a universal-ball playground, a volleyball court with sand, a playground, and a Mediterranean bowling (Boccia) area.

With the merger of the district area of several communities, in Meidling there are still more of the original local cemeteries. The largest area is covered by the Meidlinger Friedhof and the Südwestfriedhof. Also in the Meidling are Hetzendorf cemetery and the Altmannsdorfer cemetery.

== Sports ==
The first successful athletes were the Meidling Weightlifting, founded in 1884 as the "First Meidlinger athletes club" and for a long time, the most successful weightlifting club in Austria. Wilhelm Türk reached ten world records and was the 1898 world championship. Founded in 1906, the Sportclub Wacker was the first football/soccer club in Meidling. The club has won a championship and 1947 Cup Final; however, in 1973 it was merged with the club for FC Admira Wacker / Admira.

== Economy and infrastructure ==
=== Education ===
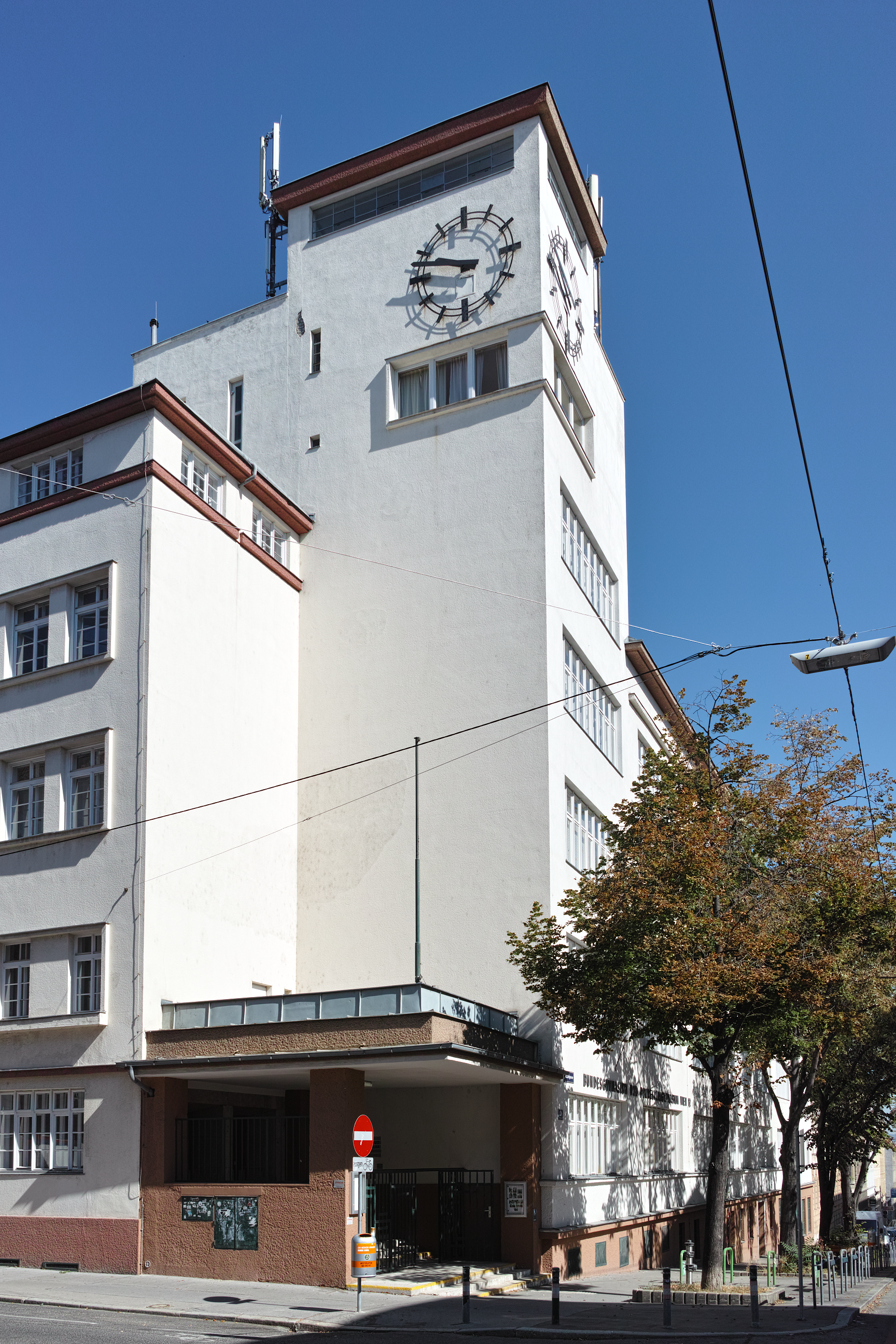
The GRG 12 Erlgasse, with its characteristic tower.

Castle Hetzendorf houses a fashion school of the City of Vienna.

There are two gymnasiums (secondary schools) in Meidling, both of them in Untermeidling: the GRG 12 Rosa Street and the GRG 12 Erlgasse. The GRG 12 Rosa Street opened in 1883. It is where Ignaz Seipel, a former Chancellor of Austria, took his Matura exams. In 1895, the Burgtheater director Friedrich Schreyvogl and 1942 Ernst Wimmer and Gerhard Fritsch, maturierten writer, and one of Europe's largest Tesla plants. The GRG 12 Erlgasse has been there since the 1950s.

Besides them, there is the GRG Singrienergasse 19–21 in Meidling; middle, this school moved to Inzersdorf at Draschestraße is known as GRG 23 VBS.

At Dörfelstraße 1, is the school for economic professionals (Fachschule für wirtschaftliche Berufe), which in 1904, was established as a home economics school for girls, and now, has college education priorities in health and social affairs and IT Support (PC technology and web design).

The Social Democratic Party of Austria runs a post-degree college for their politicians in Altmannsdorf, the Dr.-Karl-Renner-Institut.

=== Transport ===
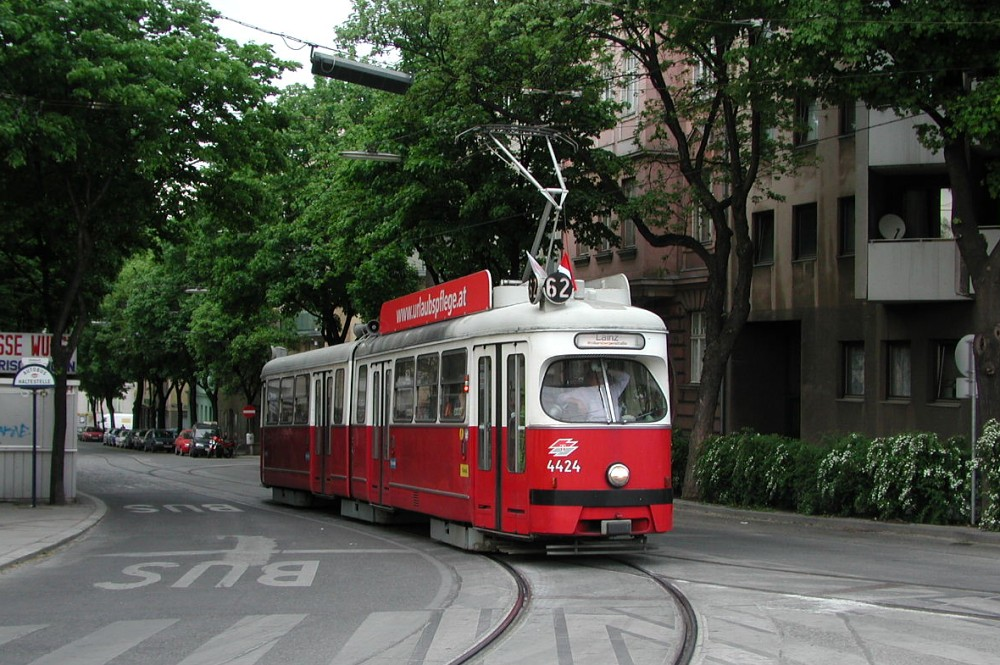
Line 62: E 4424 in Dörfelstraße (street).

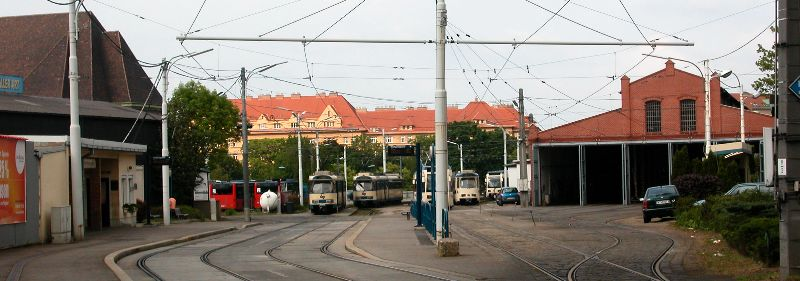
Wolfganggasse Rail Station of the Vienna local rail.

The 12th District is connected by two subway lines (U4, U6), the S-Bahn trunk route, a tram (62) and the Badner Bahn. The trams 6 and 18 driving while already on the Margaretner side of the belt are related to access to Meidling. The south train leads though Meidling, whose rail station, Vienna Meidling, is Austria's most frequented train station. Moreover, the Pottendorfer line of the south train branches off there. The Danube country train crosses the 12th district, yet the stops for Hetzendorf und Altmannsdorf are no longer in operation, which is why the passenger service does not serve on the Danube country train the local traffic in the 12th District.

=== Railways ===
Wien Meidling railway station, located on the Southern railway, is one of the largest railway stations in Vienna. It is located in Untermeidling. All trains from Vienna to Wiener Neustadt, Graz and Klagenfurt stop there.

In the 12th District, the railway station Bahnhof Wolfganggasse, of the Viennese local railroads, is where the trains of the Badner Rail are stored and wait. Opposite, in Eichenstraße (street), is the management office of the Viennese local railroads.

== Notable residents ==
- Georg Danzer (1946–2007), songwriter
- Roman Gregory (1971–), musician, comedian and moderator
- Anton Krutisch (1921–1978), poet and humorist
- Sebastian Kurz (born 1986), former Chancellor of Austria
- Hermann Leopoldi (1888–1959), Kabarettist (comedian) and keyboard humorist
- Carl Lorens (1851–1909), folksinger, poet, composer of Viennese songs
- Stefanie Nauheimer (1868–1946), feminist
- Fritz Stüber-Gunther (1872–1922), writer

== See also ==
- Meidlingerisch, Meidlinger L (de)
