= Ludwig Karpath =

Austrian musicologist (1866–1936)

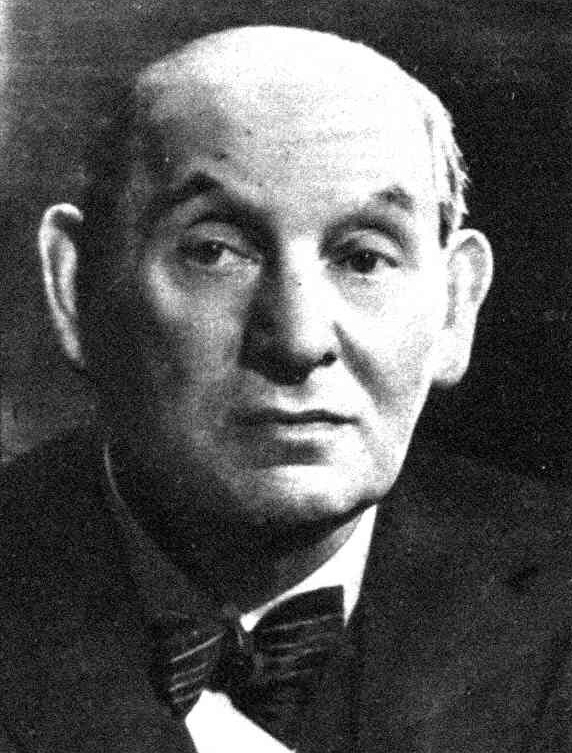
Karpath c. May 1936

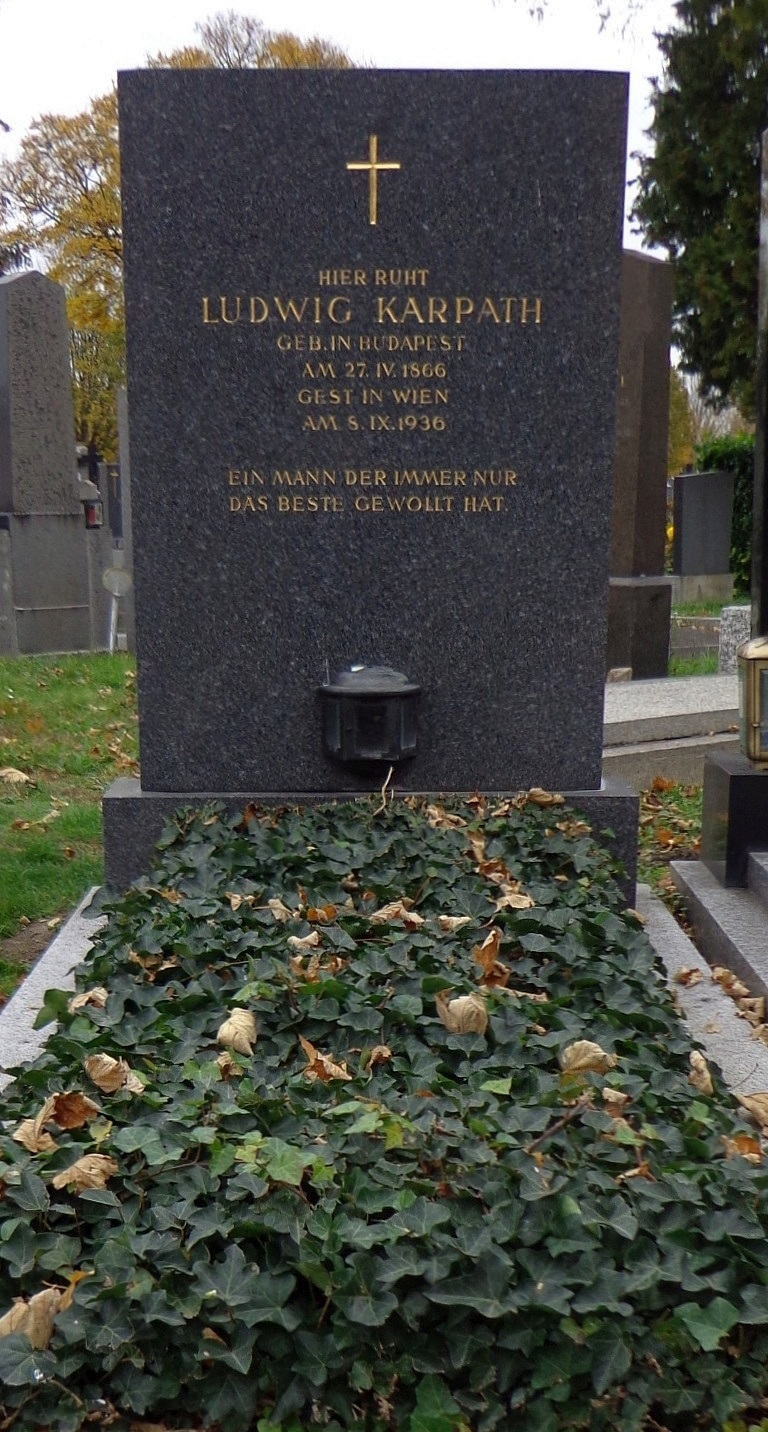
Burial place of Karpath with the inscription in his will

Ludwig Karpath (27 April 1866 – 8 September 1936; also Ludwig Kárpáth) was an Austrian musicologist.

== Life ==
Born in Pest, Karpath, son of Moritz Karpath and his wife Johanna, née Goldmark, was a nephew of the composer Karl Goldmark. He graduated from high school in Budapest and studied violin, composition and music history at the conservatory there. He also took singing lessons and trained as a bass-baritone.

In 1885 he moved to Vienna. In 1886 he undertook a study trip to America, where he worked as a musician and opera singer. In 1888 he finally settled in Vienna and worked for various Viennese newspapers as music critic. From 1894 to 1921 he was permanent music consultant for the Neues Wiener Tagblatt and from 1914 to 1917 editor of the music magazine Der Merker. He advocated the nationalization of the Konservatorium Wien Privatuniversität, the founding of the Volksoper and the construction of the Konzerthaus and was a well-known promoter of young talent. From 1923 he worked in the Bundestheater administration as a consultant for musical matters.

Karpath worked with numerous composers, including Johannes Brahms, Pietro Mascagni, Giacomo Puccini, Gustav Mahler and his wife Alma, Max Reger and Siegfried and Cosima Wagner as well as musicians, such as Arthur Nikisch, Hans Richter and Felix Mottl. Richard Strauss dedicated his ballet Schlagobers to him in 1924. In several publications he dedicated himself to these persons. As a gourmet, he also published a cookbook.

Karpart died in Vienna at age 70. On 10 September 1936, Karpath was buried in an honorary tomb at the Wiener Zentralfriedhof (group 30D, series 1, No. 170).

== Awards ==
- Title Hofrat (1926)
- Ehrenring der Stadt Wien (28. April 1936).
- Officer's Cross of the Österreichischer Verdienstorden (1934)
- Knight's Cross of the Swedish Order of Vasa, 1 Classe
- Titel Professor

== Work ==
- Siegfried Wagner als Mensch und Künstler. Leipzig 1902, Reihe Moderne Musiker, vol. 10.
- Der Kobold von Siegfried Wagner. Eine Erläuterung der Dichtung und Musik. H. Seemann Nfg. Berlin/Leipzig, o. J. (1904).
- Zu den Briefen Richard Wagners an eine Putzmacherin. Unterredung mit der Putzmacherin Bertha. Ein Beitrag zur Lebensgeschichte Richard Wagners. Harmonie, Berlin 1906.
- Unarten und Rücksichtslosigkeiten. Knepler, Vienna 1913.
- Richard Wagner, "Der Schuldenmacher". Mit zahlreichen, unbekannten und ungedruckten Dokumenten, Rechnungen, Schuldscheinen und Briefen. Kamoenenverlag, Vienna/Leipzig 1914.
- Lachende Musiker. Anekdotisches von Richard Wagner, Richard Strauss, Franz Liszt, Brahms, Bruckner, Goldmark, Hugo Wolf, Gustav Mahler und anderen Musikern. Erlebtes und Nacherzähltes. With a foreword by Leo Slezak. Knorr & Hirth, Munich 1929.
- Begegnung mit dem Genius. Denkwürdige Erlebnisse mit Johannes Brahms, Gustav Mahler, Hans Richter, Max Reger, Puccini, Mascagni, Leoncavallo, Fürstin Marie Hohenlohe, Fürstin Pauline Metternich, Franz Lehár und vielen anderen bedeutenden Menschen. 2. Auflage. Fiba, Vienna 1934.
- Jedermann seine eigene Köchin. 222 auserlesene Kochrezepte mit Ratschlägen und einer Betrachtung über Feinschmeckerei. Knorr & Hirth, München 1928.
  3., neuerlich erweiterte Auflage. Knorr & Hirth, Munich 1930.

Editions and forewords

- Richard Wagner. Briefe an Hans Richter. Edited by Ludwig Karpath. Zsolnay, Vienna 1924.
- Hugo Knepler: O, diese Künstler. Indiskretionen eines Managers. foreword by Ludwig Karpath. Fiba, Vienna 1930. (foreword).

Posthumous publications

- Österreich tafelt. With a short dinner speech by Felix Salten and a portrait of the host by Hilde Spiel. Prestel, Munich 1973, ISBN 3-7913-0059-8.
- Kalbsschnitzel "Casa Mahler". Ein sehr wienerisches Kochbuch aus der Rezeptensammlung berühmter Persönlichkeiten. Metroverlag, Vienna 2008, ISBN 978-3-902517-66-1.

== Literature ==
- "Karpath Ludwig". In: Österreichisches Biographisches Lexikon 1815–1950 (ÖBL). Vol. 3, Austrian Academy of Sciences, Vienna 1965, p. 247.
- Salomon Wininger: Große Jüdische National-Biographie. (Band 3). Czernowitz 1928, p. 410.
- Felix Czeike (ed.): Historisches Lexikon Wien. Volume 3, Kremayr & Scheriau, Vienna 1994, ISBN 3-218-00545-0, p. 470.
- Susanne Blumesberger, Michael Doppelhofer, Gabriele Mauthe: Handbuch österreichischer Autorinnen und Autoren jüdischer Herkunft 18. bis 20. Jahrhundert. Volume 2: J–R. edited by the Österreichischen Nationalbibliothek. Saur, Munich 2002, ISBN 3-598-11545-8, p. 646.
- Rudolf Flotzinger (ed.): Oesterreichisches Musiklexikon. (volume 2). Edition of the Austrian Academy of Sciences, Vienna 2003, ISBN 3-7001-3044-9.
- Helmut Brenner, Reinhold Kubik: Mahlers Menschen. Freunde und Weggefährten. St. Pölten – Salzburg – Vienna 2014, pp. 111–113, ISBN 978-3-7017-3322-4.
