= Rudolf Kalmar junior =

Austrian journalist and author

Rudolf Kalmar
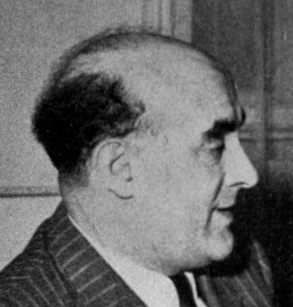
- ‘’ca. 1950’’
- Born: 18 September 1900; Vienna, Austro-Hungary
- Died: 18 January 1974 (aged 73); Vienna, Austria
- Education: University of Vienna
- Occupations: Journalist; Commentator; Newspaper editor-in-chief<be>Author
- Known for: his books reporting, in the manner of an experienced journalist, on the (not quite) seven years he spent in concentration camps between 1938 and 1944.

Rudolf Kalmar (18 September 1900 – 18 January 1974) was an Austrian journalist and author.

After 1945 Kalmar wrote and published several books on his experiences as a concentration camp inmate during more than seven years. They read as a series of reports produced by an experienced political journalist, and that is what they were. Commentators at the time were frequently struck by the way in which, while never shrinking from contextualising the concentration camp atrocities in terms of the atrocities perpetrated by the German authorities and camp guards, Kalmar also took care to focus also on positive aspects of the concentration camp experience, notably on the ways in which camp inmates looked after each other and, even among those set in authority over them, there were examples to be found of simple unthinking human solidarity. Critics have commended the power of the sheer objectivity of Kalmar’s reports of concentration camp life. Along with this went a powerful determination, throughout almost three decades during which Kalmar lived on as a well-known concentration camp survivor, that the lessons of Austria’s seven years as an increasingly well integrated component state of Germany under (“Nazism”) should be forgotten. The first and best known of Kalmar’s books on the concentration camps, “Zeit ohne Gnade” (‘’loosely, ””Merciless times’’), appeared in 1946.

== Life ==
Rudolf Kalmar was born in Vienna. His father, also called Rudolf Kalmar (1870–1939), was a court official at the Vienna “Exekutionsgericht” (‘’loosely, “Court of Enforcement and Implementation”’’) who later became a journalist and an increasingly eminent member of the Vienna media establishment. The younger Rudolf Kalmar attended the Stiftsgymnasium Seitenstetten, a prestigious monastic secondary school to the west of Vienna, along the main line towards Linz and the west. From there he moved on to the University of Vienna where he studied Jurisprudence and Political Sciences. Having obtained a first degree he progressed, in 1927, to receive his doctorate (Doctor rerum politicarum). By this time he had already, since 1919, been combining his university studies with a part-time involvement in journalism, contributing reports on local news and arts topics to the Deutsches Volksblatt, a daily newspaper published in Vienna, to which his father had been a contributor since 1916.

With the 1922 launch of the daily newspaper Der Tag (rebranded, in 1930, as Der Wiener Tag). Kalmar at once joined the new publication. For many years he took editorial charge of the paper’s local section, while at the same time contributing to the ”Feuilleton” (politics, arts and opinions) supplement. In 1934 he became co-editor in chief of Der Tag”, jointly with Vincenz Ludwig Ostry. At the same time he became editor in chief at Der Morgen, a weekly non-political newspaper, closely associated with Der Tag, which appeared on Mondays and was presented in the first instance as a “sports newspaper”. Meanwhile, Austrian democracy had been in rapid retreat since before 1933 and an overtly Austrofascist government took power in July 1934. Political trends in Austria mirrored those in Germany during and after 1933. The Vienna newspapers for which Kalmar had editorial responsibility, like Kalmar himself, were uncompromisingly opposed to these developments. Between 1934 and 1938 he contributed a weekly column headed “Social Policy of the Day” which he regularly used to campaign in print for the “rights of the little man”.

In March 1938 Austria was annexed to Germany creating an enlarged version of Germany. The aspiration for a single German state was nothing new, and although the annexation was marked by the arrival of German troops from the north, it progressed rapidly, with little obvious resistance. Arthur Seyss-Inquart, a committed Hitlerite who had been installed as the Austrian Interior Minister a month before the annexation, would have had oversight of the Austrian security services, and there is speculation that by the time the German army crossed the border on 12 March 1938, Seyss-Inquart, with or without input from Berlin, had already drawn up a list of leading Austrian opinion formers who might prove particularly troublesome to the National Socialist project. In Vienna (and other Austrian cities) arrests quickly followed the invasion. Rudolf Kalmar was arrested on 17 March 1938. On 2 April 1938 he was part of the so-called Prominententransport”, Austria’s first mass transportation to a concentration camp. There were 150 (or possibly 151) included in it, among them many of the country’s leading politicians and intellectuals. These included several prominent journalists, of whom Kalmar was one. He would later recall the abuse from onlookers at the main intercity railway station as the internees were unceremoniously persuaded onto the special train for Dachau, just the other side of Munich : “Lazy Jew-infested coffee-bar rabble”. As he wrote, “at the railway station, we were no longer human”. Although he spent most of the next seven years as an inmate of the concentration camp at Dachau, he was also held for five months at the Flossenbürg concentration camp which provided labour for the nearby Messerchmitt plant and surrounding quarries. The camp was set in the mountains, and experienced a particularly high death rate due to the cold wet winters to which inmates were subjected while accommodated in flimsy camp huts, but Kalmar nevertheless survived the experience.

Back at Dachau, an unusual open-air stage premier was presented on 13 June 1943 on the “small roll-call square”. By this time the slaughter of war had left Germany desperately short of men to fight in the army, and while camp security remained in the hands of German guards, much of the day to day camp administration was, by this stage, undertaken by selected inmates whom the camp director and his team placed a certain level of trust. This was the context in which a group of Austrian, German and Czech inmates gave a performance to fellow inmates of “Die Blutnacht auf dem Schreckenstein”. The stage play parodied the traditional-comedic format of the old Austrian ”Pradler Ritterspiele”, and followed that tradition by featuring a large number of theatrical deaths. On another level it was transparently a “Hitler satire”. The star role was taken by the shoe-maker’s son, Erwin Geschonneck, who also directed all six performances. The playwright was Rudolf Kalmar.

As the military situation became increasingly hopeless for Germany, in September 1944 Kalmar was one of those conscripted from the concentration camp into an army punishment battalion. They were sent to the Russian front. Very soon his unit encountered the Soviet army and was overwhelmed. On 5 September 1945 he returned home from the Soviet POW came to Vienna which by this point had already been under military occupation for several months. Kalmar was briefly employed with the National Theatre Administration office in the arts and culture section of the Education Ministry. By the end of 1945 he had returned to his former career as a newspaper journalist, however.

In 1945 Kalmar became regular contributing editor to Neues Österreich, a mass-circulation daily newspaper launched in anticipation of the end of the war in April of that same year, with the backing of the mainstream political parties of the Soviet-backed left, centre-left and centre-right as “an organ of democratic unification”. Between 1947 and 1956 he was in charge of the publication’s Vienna region office and editor-in-chief. During this period he was also a frequent contributor of scripts for programmes transmitted on the radio and television services of ORF, the national broadcasting service. After stepping down from his senior post at Neues Österreich Kalmar became a contributor, between 1957 and 1960, to Die Presse, a mass-circulation Vienna-based newspaper with a national reach. He then, in 1960, to a position as head of the Literature Office at National Theatre Administration, with which he had already briefly worked in a more junior capacity in the 1940s.

During the 1950s Kalmar emerged as a leading member of the Vienna press establishment, and in 1958 he was elected to the presidency of the Austrian “Concordia” Press Club. (He had already served as voce-president in the years immediately before 1938.) The political context in which the press operated had been transformed in 1955 when Nikita Khrushchev, who by this time had emerged as Stalin’s de facto successor in Moscow, stunned the governments of the western wartime allies by abruptly agreeing to ending the ten years of military occupation. Austria had the opportunity to determine its own future with fewer constraints than at any time since 1938 (or indeed, by some criteria, several decades earlier). For the press club this meant a new role. Under Kalmar’s presidency. The Press Club became a forum for the most important political press conferences, and for presentations by visiting foreign statesmen. He also suggested and backed the first “Concordia Ball” since the war. This was held in 1960, and became a social focus for the political class of the newly democratic Austria. He was also a member of the Austrian P.E.N. club.

== Recognition (selection) ==
- 1960: Vienna Medal of Honour
- 1960: Grand Decoration of Honour (Grosses Ehrenzeichen) for Services to the Republic of Austria
- 1961: Commander of the Ordre des Palmes académiques
- 1963: Prize from the City of Vienna for [serious] journalism
- 1970: Ring of Honour of the City of Vienna

== Published output (selection) ==
- Täglicher Ratgeber für das praktische Leben. Was sage ich – was tue ich in allen Lebenslagen?. Unter der Mitarbeit namhafter Fachleute zusammengestellt und bearbeitet von Rudolf Kalmar. Verlag Wehle & Höfels, Wien/Leipzig 1933.
- Die Blutnacht auf dem Schreckenstein oder Ritter Adolars Brautfahrt und ihr grausiges Ende oder Die wahre Liebe ist das nicht. Ein komisch-schauriges Ritterstück in drei Aufzügen mit Musik. Manuskript. Dachau 1943.
- Zeit ohne Gnade. Schönbrunn-Verlag, Wien 1946
  Neuauflage; herausgegeben, kommentiert und mit einem Nachwort versehen von Stefan Maurer und Martin Wedl. Metroverlag, Wien 2009, ISBN 978-3-902517-84-5.
- Land vom Kahlenberg. Feuilletons. Buchschmuck von Erika Wolf. Verlag Neues Österreich, Wien 1949.
- Manuskripte zu den Radioreihen Eine Woche Österreich, Das kleine Leben, Kulturbericht, Österreichische Persönlichkeiten und zur Fernsehreihe Der Fenstergucker
