= Theresienbad =

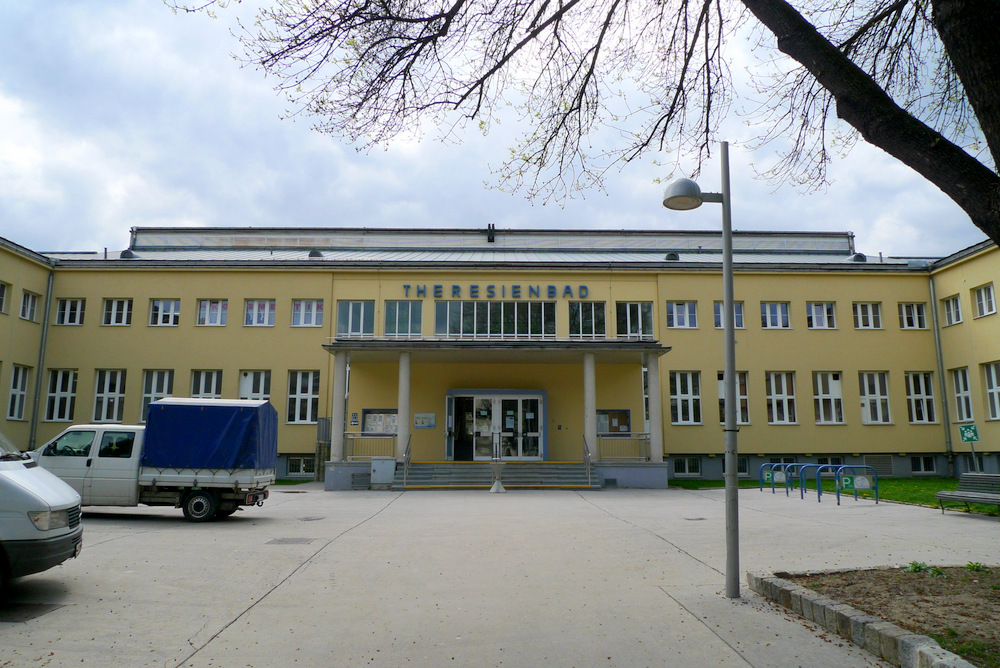

General information
- Type: pool complex
- Location: Meidling, Vienna, Austria
- Coordinates: 48.1817°N 16.3281°E

The Theresienbad is a complex of indoor and outdoor swimming pools in the Meidling district of urban Vienna.

It includes an indoor pool with a sauna, a steam bath (and former public bath) and a diving platform, and a summer pool. There is a heated paddling pool for children.

In the swimming pool there are two monumental ceramic mosaics by Carry Hauser including Bather (1964), and mosaics in the steam room by Paul Meissner (Scene of the Ancients bathing, 1953) and Rudolf Hausner (Triton playing the flute, 1953).

At the entrance to the pool hall there is a bronze sculpture by Oskar Thiede, designed as a monument to the baths' history.

== See also ==
- 2015 Vienna swimming pool rape
