= Harry Zohn =

Austrian-American author and translator

- Born: November 21, 1923; Vienna
- Died: June 3, 2001 (aged 77)
- Citizenship: United States of America
- Education: Suffolk University (BA); Clark University (MAT); Harvard University (PhD)
- Occupations: essayist and translator

Harry Zohn (November 21, 1923, Vienna – June 3, 2001, Boston) was an Austrian American literary historian, essayist and translator from German into English. Zohn was born in Austria. Aged 15 he fled to England in January 1939, where he was classified as an enemy alien, and worked as a farm labourer. He was subsequently joined there by his parents, and the family emigrated to the United States in 1940, settling in Boston.

== Awards ==
- 1960: Federal Cross of Merit 1st Class
- 1999: Ring of Honor of the City of Vienna
