= Gertrud Herzog-Hauser =

Austrian classical philologist

- Born: Gertrud Herzog; 15 June 1894; Vienna, Austria
- Died: 9 October 1953 (aged 59); Vienna, Austria
- Education: University of Vienna; Humboldt University of Berlin
- Occupation: Classical philologist
- Employer(s): University of Vienna; Somerville College, Oxford
- Spouse: Carry Hauser (m. 1922)

Gertrud Herzog-Hauser (15 June 1894 – 9 October 1953) was an Austrian classical philologist. She was specialised in ancient mythology and religion as well as Latin literature and published Latin school textbooks. She campaigned for equal rights for women in education.

== Life ==
Herzog-Hauser was born in 1894 in Vienna and studied Classical Philology, German Studies and Philosophy in Vienna and Berlin, where she was taught by Ulrich von Wilamowitz-Moellendorff. On 22 December 1916 she gained her doctorate in Vienna where she was the student of Ludwig Radermacher. In 1917 she took the Staatsexamen for teaching.

Herzog-Hauser worked as teacher at a girls' Gymnasium, the GRG 6 Rahlgasse in Mariahilf, from 1917 to 1937. She also wrote entries for the Realencyclopädie der classischen Altertumswissenschaft. In 1922 she married the artist Carry Hauser. In 1932, she gave birth to a son named Heinrich. In the same year, she became the first Austrian woman to gain a habilitation at university and she gave lectures at the University of Vienna. In 1937 she became principal of the Gymnasium in Mariahilf.

After the Anschluss, on 22 April 1938, Herzog-Hauser lost her job as she was classified as a Jew by the Nazi Regime, even though she was Catholic. Her husband also lost his job because of political reasons. In 1939, Herzog-Hauser and her husband emigrated to the Netherlands. She then became a refugee scholar at Somerville College, Oxford where she stayed during the Second World War.

In 1946, Herzog-Hauser emigrated to Switzerland and soon returned to the University of Vienna where she became a professor. She also taught at a girls' Gymnasium in Hietzing called the Wenzgasse and worked together with the writer Käthe Braun-Prager as chair of the Vereins der Schriftstellerinnen und Künstlerinnen (Association of Woman Writers and Artists). Herzog-Hauser was Vienna's first university lecturer in classical languages and was offered a teaching position in Australia, which she turned down as her husband received the opportunity to go to Switzerland. In 1950, she was offered a position at the University of Innsbruck but she got a stroke and died three years later in Vienna.

On 12 November 2009, the Gymnasium GRG 6 Rahlgasse dedicated a memorial plaque to her.

== Selected publications ==
- Altgriechische Liebesgedichte. Vienna, 1924.
- Publius Ovidius Naso: Ausgewählte Dichtungen. Vienna, 1928.
- Soter. Die Gestalt des Retters im altgriechischen Epos. Vienna, 1931.
- Octavia: Fabula praetexta. Vienna, 1934.
- Uit de Vrouwenbrieven van den H. Hieronymus. 's-Hertogenbosch, 1941.
- Antonius von Padua. Sein Leben und sein Werk. Lucerne, 1947.
- De Godsdienst der Grieken. Roermond, 1952.
- Die Frau in der griechisch-römischen Antik. 1954.
