= Carry Hauser =

Austrian artist and poet (1895–1985)

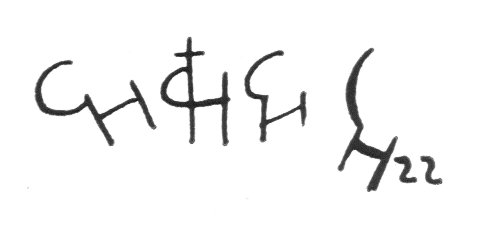
Signatures

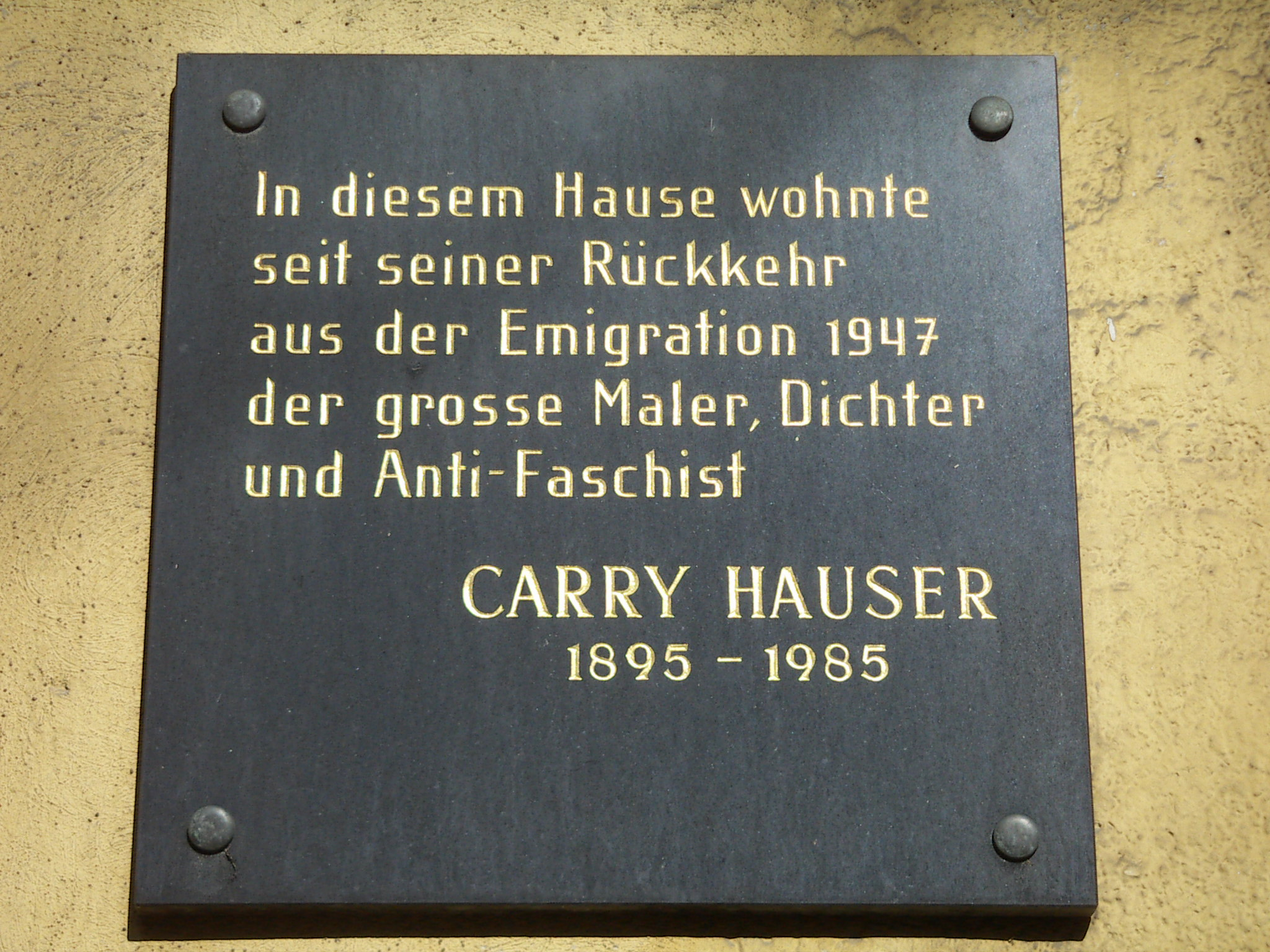
Memorial plaque in Vienna

Carry Hauser, born Carl Maria Hauser (16 February 1895 – 28 October 1985), was an Austrian painter, stage set designer and poet.

== Life ==
Carry Hauser was born in Vienna as Carl Maria Hauser into the family of a civil servant. He was educated at the Schottengymnasium and the Höhere Graphische Bundes-Lehr- und Versuchsanstalt, after which he studied at the Wiener Kunstgewerbeschule under, among others, Adolf Michael Boehm, Anton von Kenner, Alfred Roller and Oskar Strnad. He then began his career as a painter, illustrator, theatrical designer and author, which was interrupted by World War I, for military service in which he volunteered in 1914. His war experiences made him a pacifist.

After the war he returned to Vienna, where among others he met Franz Theodor Csokor, for whose play Die rote Straße ("The Red Street") he designed the set in 1918. In the same year the first comprehensive exhibition of his work was held, in the museum at Opava, and another was arranged for him by Arthur Roessler, although his earlier works had been lost during the war and could not be exhibited. He became still better-known in 1919 through his portfolio Die Insel ("The Island").

From 1919 to 1922 Hauser was a leading member of the artists' group Freie Bewegung ("Free Movement"), and also belonged to the artists' society Der Fels ("The Rock") while he lived for a time in Passau. From 1925 to 1938 he was a member of another artists' group, the Hagenbund, of which he was president in 1927/28. In the theatrical world he was vice-president of the Vienna Theatre Guild (Wiener Theatergilde). During the 1930s in the time of the Ständestaat he was active in the Patriotic Front (Vaterländische Front).

After the Anschluss of 1938, Hauser, because of his political stance, was banned by the National Socialists from working and exhibiting. In 1939 he was given an appointment in the art school of Melbourne but was prevented from taking it up by the outbreak of World War II. His wife, Gertrud Herzog-Hauser (1894–1953), to whom he had been married since 1922, was of Jewish origin and emigrated to the Netherlands and as refugee scholar to Somerville College, Oxford, where she managed to survive the war. Hauser went into exile in Switzerland, where he wrote Eine Geschichte vom verlorenen Sohn (1941, privately published 1945), the novel Zwischen gestern und morgen (1945) and the fairytale Maler, Tod und Jungfrau (1946).

In 1947 Hauser and his wife returned to Vienna and took part in the reconstruction. In 1952 he became General Secretary of the Austrian PEN Club, and later its vice-president, which he remained until 1972. He was also a council member of the organisation Aktion gegen Antisemitismus ("Action Against Antisemitism") and was involved in the revival of the Berufsvereinigung der bildenden Künstler Österreichs ("Professional Union of the Fine Artists of Austria"), of which he was later vice-president.

He died in 1985 in Rekawinkel. He is buried in a grave of honour in the cemetery at Hietzing.

== Awards ==
- 1929: Silver Medal of the International Exhibition in Barcelona
- 1936: awarded the title "Professor"
- 1936: Knight's Cross of the Austrian Order of Merit (Ritterkreuz des Österreichischen Verdienstordens)
- 1949: Prize of the City of Vienna for Fine Art
- 1985: Ring of Honour of the City of Vienna (Ehrenring der Stadt Wien)

== Publications ==
- Buch der Träume. Published by the artists' group Der Fels, Passau 1922.
  2nd edition. Galerie Pabst, Vienna/Munich 1976.
- with Robert Haas: Ein Tischzucht. Hanns Sachs. Friedrich Siegel Druck, Vienna 1922.
- with Georg Philipp Wörlen: Köpfe. Published by the artists' group Der Fels, Passau 1923.
- with Georg Philipp Wörlen: Heilige. Published by the artists' group Der Fels, Passau 1923.
- Illustrations for Else Feldmann's serialised novel Der Leib der Mutter in the Arbeiter-Zeitung, Vienna 1924.
- Von Kunst und Künstlern in Österreich. Heimat-Verlag, Brixlegg 1938.
- Dalmatinisches Skizzenbuch. Hans Deutsch, Vienna 1962.
- with Erich Fritzbauer, Axl Leskoschek: Die einen und die andern. Bilanz einer Jahrzehntwende. Edition Graphischer Zirkel, Vienna 1981.
- with Erich Fritzbauer: Eins in des andern Spur. Edition Graphischer Zirkel, Vienna 1985.

== Works ==
His versatile oeuvre as a painter of portraits, genre works, history paintings and landscapes and as a designer is represented in the collections of the Wien Museum, the Albertina and the Österreichische Galerie Belvedere. His activity as a set designer included works for the Burgtheater. He was also prolific as a book and book-cover illustrator. His earlier works were related to those of - for example - George Grosz, Otto Dix or Ludwig Meidner, but by the end of the 1920s he had developed his own style, combining features from both Neue Sachlichkeit and Expressionism.

His best-known works include:

- Der Judaskuss, oil, 1923
- Fastenbild in the church of Albrechtsberg bei Krems
- Frescoes on the Simplon Pass
- Mosaics in the Theresienbad, Vienna, 1964
- Pietà in the Am Schöpfwerk Church, about 1980

== Stage set designs ==
- Die Rote Straße (Franz Theodor Csokor), National Theatre, Brno
- Wozzeck (Georg Büchner), Raimundtheater, Vienna
- Gesellschaft der Menschenrechte (Franz Theodor Csokor), Burgtheater, Vienna
- The Constant Prince (Pedro Calderon), Burgtheater, Vienna

== Sources and references ==
- Oswald Oberhuber: Carry Hauser zum 90. Geburtstag. Eine Rehabilitation. Hochschule für die Angewandte Kunst Wien, Vienna 1985.
- Gabriele Koller, Gloria Withalm: Die Vertreibung des Geistigen aus Österreich. Zur Kulturpolitik des Nationalsozialismus. Exhibition catalague 1985 Zentralsparkasse und Kommerzialbank, Vienna, 1986 Salzburger Museum Carolino Augusteum. Publ: Zentralsparkasse und Kommerzialbank Wien, Vienna 1985, pp. 130f.
- Gerwald Sonnberger, Franz X. Hofer, Annerose Riedel (eds.): Carry Hauser - Georg Philipp Wörlen, Andreas-Haller-Verlag, Passau 1988, ISBN 3-88849-991-7
- Erika Patka: Carry Hauser 1895–1985. Exhibition catalogue, Exhibition held 1989 in the Women's Baths, Baden bei Wien, Niederösterreich-Gesellschaft für Kunst und Kultur, Vienna 1989, ISBN 3-900933-00-6

Dictionary entries

- Österreicher der Gegenwart. Lexikon schöpferischer und schaffender Zeitgenossen. Österreichische Staatsdruckerei, Vienna 1951, p. 104.
- Hans Vollmer (ed.): Allgemeines Lexikon der bildenden Künstler des XX. Jahrhunderts. Vol. 2. Seemann, Leipzig 1955. Reprinted dtv, Munich 1992, ISBN 3-423-05909-5, p. 392.
- Heinrich Fuchs: Die österreichischen Maler. Die Geburtsjahrgänge 1881–1900. Self-published, Vienna 1976, vol. 1, pp.K92f.
- Walter Kleindel: Das große Buch der Österreicher. 4500 Personendarstellungen in Wort und Bild. Namen, Daten, Fakten. With Hans Veigl. Kremayr & Scheriau, Vienna 1987, ISBN 3-218-00455-1, p. 179.
- Isabella Ackerl, Friedrich Weissensteiner: Personenlexikon der Ersten und Zweiten Republik. Ueberreuter, Vienna 1992, ISBN 3-8000-3464-6, p. 167.
- Felix Czeike: Historisches Lexikon Wien. Kremayr & Scheriau, Vienna 1994, ISBN 3-218-00545-0 (vol. 3) p. 88f.
