= Vienna swimming pool rape =

2015 child sexual abuse case in Austria

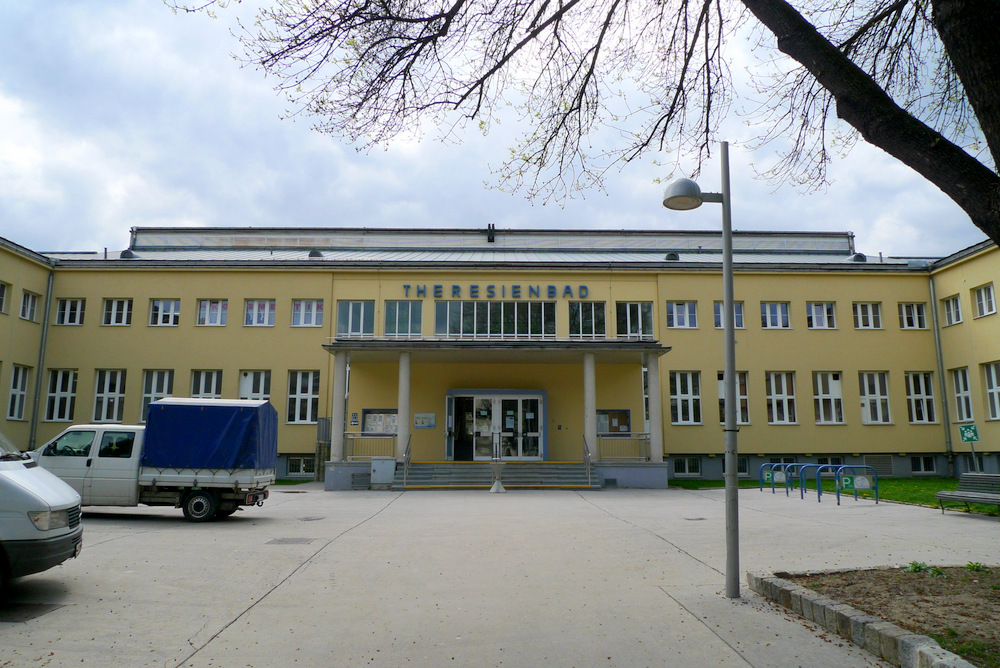
Theresienbad

On 2 December 2015, at the Theresienbad swimming pool in the Austrian capital Vienna, a 10-year-old boy was raped. The perpetrator, a 20-year-old Iraqi refugee who had arrived in the country two months earlier, claimed that he was motivated by not having sex for four months and was suffering from a "sexual emergency".

The crime became public knowledge in February 2016, and in June the man was sentenced to a minimum six years in jail. In October, the Supreme Court of Austria overturned his rape conviction and ordered a retrial. At the retrial his sentence was increased to 7 years. In May 2017, the man's sentence was reduced to four years.

The crime was one of several at the time which led to anti-refugee sentiment in Austria, and the overturning of the original conviction was condemned by Russian president Vladimir Putin.

== Background ==
The perpetrator, identified as Amir A., was born in Iraq, where he worked as a taxi driver. In 2013, he emigrated via Baghdad in search of work in Europe, intending to travel to Sweden, but after being stopped from further travel through Hamburg, Germany, he made his way to Austria in September 2015. A. was married and intended to bring his wife and daughter over at a later date. A. also stated that despite his marriage, he regularly had sexual encounters with men while still in Iraq, bribing local authorities to avoid prosecution for homosexuality.

The victim, identified by the alias "Goran", was born in Vienna as the son of Serbian refugees.

== Rape ==
Amir A. grabbed the boy in a rest room and pulled the victim into a toilet cubicle. The boy was raped and the perpetrator ejaculated on the victim's torso. The victim was restrained by the perpetrator, causing bruising to the hips, and ignored the boy's crying, verbal pleads to stop and attempts to reach for the door handle. The man then left and continued diving at the pool. The child told a lifeguard and the man was arrested. The perpetrator initially claimed that a 15-year-old boy had "brought" him the victim and been the one to suggest the rape, but this was proven to be a lie, leading to an additional charge of slander.

== Legal proceedings ==
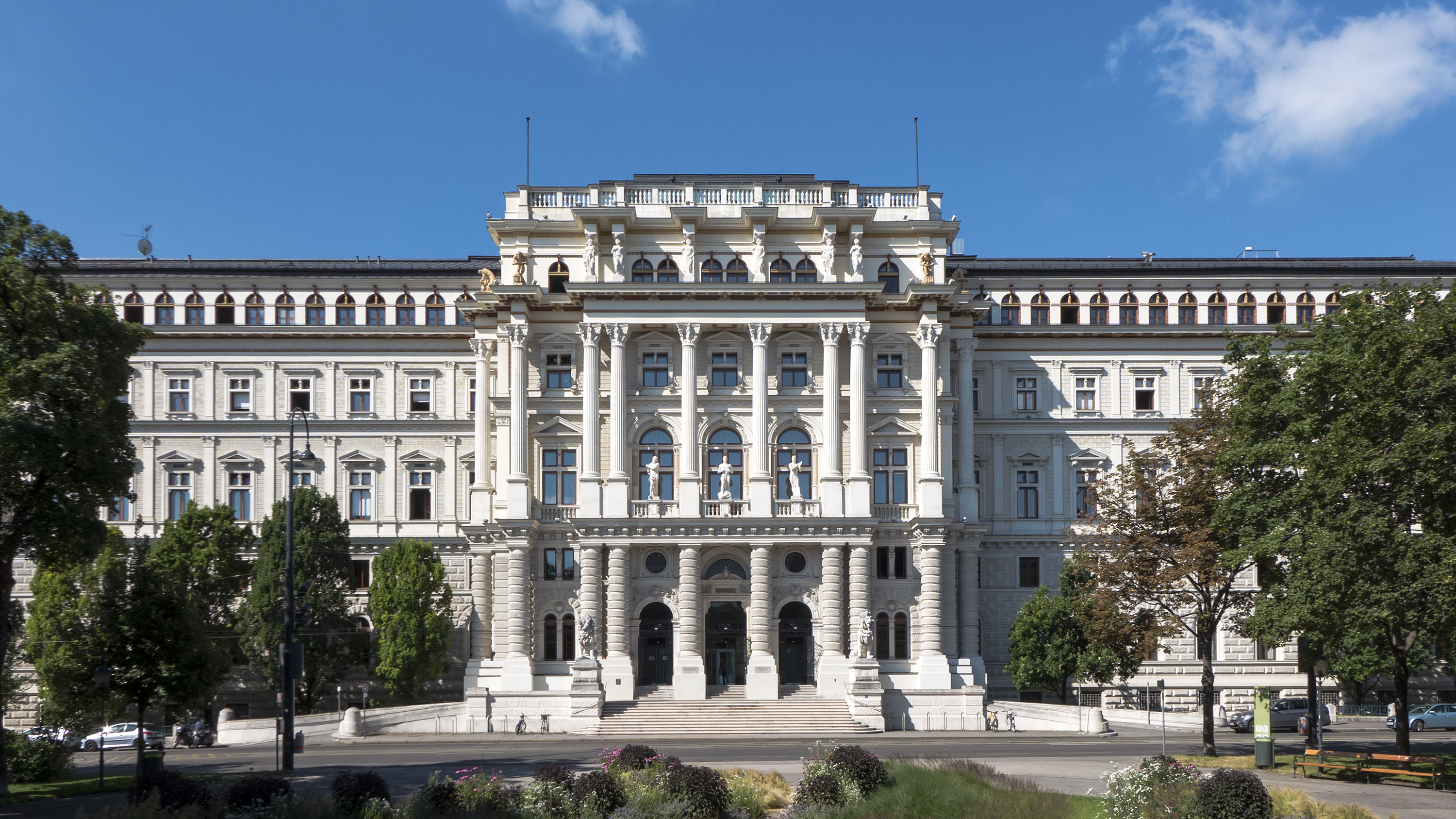
The Supreme Court of Austria overturned the conviction of rape and ordered a retrial

The crime was not made public knowledge until February 2016, with the police giving the reason as to protect the victim. Thomas Keiblinger, spokesman of police in Vienna, denied that the incident had been covered up because the perpetrator was a refugee.

The perpetrator said that the sight of the boy "aroused [him] so much [he] could not hold back" and that he had not had sex for four months as his partner had been ill since giving birth. The perpetrator further stated that he "followed his desires" because he had "a marked surplus of sexual energy" and knew that his act would be illegal in any country of the world. His defence lawyers mentioned his youth, living conditions and no criminal record in either Austria or Iraq in mitigation.

In court, it was heard that the victim had been profoundly disturbed by the crime, and was considering suicide. His family was awarded €4,700 in compensation. The man was sentenced to six years in prison in June 2016, with a maximum 15 years, and possible deportation at the end.

In October 2016, the Austrian Supreme Court overturned the man's conviction of rape, ordering a retrial, while upholding his second charge of aggravated sexual assault of a minor. The rationale was that the prosecution had not provided evidence that the man did not know that his victim did not consent. The man was kept in police custody until his retrial where his sentence was increased to 7 years and the compensation award increased.

In May 2017, judge Thomas Philipp reduced the sentence to four years in a final decision by the Supreme Court, saying that the rape was a "one-off incident" and "you cannot lose your sense of proportion here".

== Reaction ==
The crime contributed to a rise in anti-refugee sentiment in Austria. The New York Times mentioned it and the gang rape of a grandmother in Traiskirchen as incidents that were causing a growth in support for the Freedom Party of Austria candidate Norbert Hofer in the 2016 election.

Vladimir Putin, the president of Russia, spoke after the original conviction was overturned, a rare comment by him on the refugee crisis. He said "It doesn’t fit into my head what on earth they’re thinking over there. I can’t even explain the rationale – is it a sense of guilt before the migrants? What’s going on? It’s not clear. A society that cannot defend its children has no future".
