= Hanns Egon Wörlen =

German architect and art patron

Hanns Egon Wörlen (5 April 1915 – 17 February 2014) was a German architect and art patron.

Born in Marnheim in 1915, Wörlen was the son of painter and graphic artist Georg Philipp Wörlen and his wife Margaret. At the age of five, he moved with his parents to Passau. He studied architecture at the Technical University of Munich and was drafted into military service to fight in World War II.

In October 1947, he became a freelance architect after returning home from being a prisoner of war. He sought to preserve and restore Passau by becoming a member of the Donau-Wald-Gruppe, an association of local visual artists. In 1990, he founded the Museum of Modern Art in Passau, which he began by displaying his father's artwork, and remained connected to it until his death in 2014 at the age of 98.

== Selected awards ==
In 1977, Wörlen was awarded the Federal Cross of Merit, upgraded to the Commander's Cross in 1997. In 1995, he was awarded the Bavarian Order of Merit.
