= Kunstschau Wien 1908 =

Art and craft exhibition

The Kunstschau Wien 1908 (engl: Vienna Art Show) was an art and craft exhibition held from June 1 to November 16, 1908, on the grounds of what became the Wiener Konzerthaus (engl: Vienna Concert Hall) in Vienna, Austria. The show was one of dozens of events and festivities marking the 60th anniversary of the reign of Emperor Franz Joseph I. It was organized by Austrian artist Gustav Klimt and the community of avant-garde artists surrounding him, including most notably Koloman Moser, Alfred Roller, Carl Otto Czeschka, Otto Prutscher, and Josef Hoffmann. Despite organizing the workshop, considered to be a ground-breaking showcase of Viennese modernism, Klimt and his colleagues were not invited to the formal, official, celebrations.

The event was held on the grounds of today's Wiener Konzerthaus, built in 1913. In just a few months, the artists erected a wooden building designed by Josef Hoffmann, and curated the surrounding grounds, some 6,500 square meters and had 54 exhibition rooms, to include a café, courtyards, gardens, and a small cemetery. The exhibitions featured more than 170 artists, especially faculty and student artists from the Vienna School of Arts and Crafts, the Art School for Women and Girls and the Wiener Werkstatte, and a variety of modes of art, such as sculpture, mosaics, textiles, documentary photographs, glassware, silverware, architectural plans, furniture, and of course paintings and drawings of many techniques.

Gustav Klimt, the lead organizer of the event, had recently been under significant public criticism after his paintings for the University of Vienna, Philosophy, Medicine and Jurisprudence were deemed pornographic. The Kunstschau was also criticized and ultimately was a financial disaster, but many of the artists featured went on to have long and prominent career in Austria and around the world Klimt's painting, Der Kiss (English: The Kiss) was bought by the Viennese government before the exhibition had finished, “as it was deemed a national interest." Today it is held at the Vienna Belvedere and is considered a masterpiece.
