= Georg Philipp Wörlen =

German painter

Georg Philipp Wörlen (5 May 1886, Dillingen an der Donau, Bavarian Swabia – 18 April 1954) was a German painter, particularly associated with Passau, Bavaria, Germany.

== Life ==
Wörlen was born in Dillingen an der Donau. After completing his Abitur he attended the art college in Nuremberg and subsequently worked as a restorer in the Atelier Altheimer in Regensburg. In 1914, after marrying Margarete Neunhöfer, he moved to Marnheim to work as a teacher in a technical secondary school. While he was fighting at the front in World War I in Romania and France, among other places, his son Hanns Egon was born.

During the war Wörlen was twice buried and seriously injured. Shortly before the end of the war he was captured by the British and was held as a prisoner of war for 15 months, in a camp near Ripon in Yorkshire. During this time he changed his artistic direction and committed himself to Expressionism and Cubism.

After his repatriation in 1920 Wörlen moved with his family to Passau and became an art teacher in the Gymnasium Leopoldinum. Along with Franz Bronstert and Fritz Fuhrken, who had been detained in the same POW camp in England, and a number of other artists including the Austrian Carry Hauser, he founded the Expressionist artists' group Der Fels (1920/21-1927), which held over 30 exhibitions featuring his work. in addition he was for a short time (1923/1924) a member of the Gruppe der 6, and between 1927 and 1938 he was a member of the Vienna-based group Der Hagenbund. In 1947 he was a founder member of the Donau-Wald-Gruppe.

He died in Passau, where there is a street named after him. The holdings of the Museum of Modern Art in Passau consist largely of his works.

== Selected works ==
- Liebespaar ("Lovers"), tempera on cardboard, 1920
- Gasse ("Lane"), oil on linen, nd
- Passauer Häuser ("Passau Houses"), oil on linen, 1920
- Passauer Gasse ("Passau Lane"), watercolour, 1923
- Kreuzigung ("Crucifixion"), watercolour, 1919
