= Max von Millenkovich =

Austrian music writer

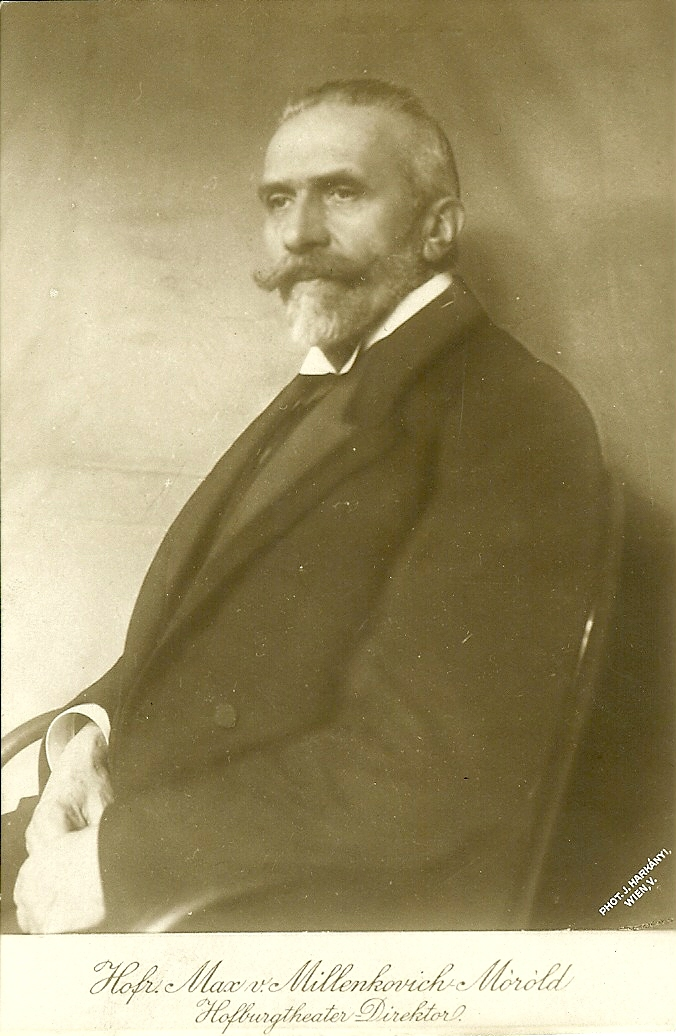
Portrait photo as Director of the Hofburgtheater 1917–18

Max von Millenkovich, also known by the pseudonym Max Morold (2 March 1866 – 5 February 1945), was an Austrian writer about music and librettist who was also from 1917 to 1918 director of the K.K. Hofburgtheater, now the Burgtheater, in Vienna. He is best remembered as a writer for his work Dreigestirn: Wagner, Liszt, Bülow.

== Biography ==
Millenkovich was born in Vienna, the son of the writer Stephan von Millenkovich and the brother of Admiral Benno von Millenkovich. After taking a law degree he worked for many years as an Imperial civil servant, ultimately in the Ministry for Arts. In 1917 he took over the direction of the Hofburgtheater after the departure of Hugo Thimig. However, Emperor Karl I (abdicated November 1918) intended the Burgtheater to take a special cultural role in his desire for the cohesion of the multi-ethnic state, which was entirely at odds with Millenkovich's openly-declared support for pro-German nationalism, so Millenkovich was rapidly displaced. A highlight from his short time as director was the engagement of the popular actor Alexander Girardi. In 1918, for the first time at the Burgtheater, he produced Ferdinand Raimund's Der Bauer als Millionär with Girardi as Fortunatus Wurzel.

While still a civil servant Millenkovich began writing about music, often under the pseudonym "Max Morold". From 1930 he was Viennese correspondent for the Völkischer Beobachter, and in 1931 he became a member of the board of the Austrian branch of the nationally minded, anti-Semitic Kampfbund für deutsche Kultur. By his own admission, he was a member of the Austrian Nazi Party from 1 November 1932 (membership number 1,305,829). After the party was banned in 1933, he became a member of the Reichsverband Deutscher Schriftsteller (Reich Association of German Writers). In the period up to 1938 he wrote a work about Cosima Wagner. After the Anschluss (the German takeover of Austria in 1938) he published Richard Wagner in Wien and Dreigestirn (Wagner – Liszt – Bülow), published in Leipzig in 1940.

In 1941 he published his memoirs entitled Vom Abend bis zum Morgen ("From Evening to Morning"), in which he described Adolf Hitler as "the embodiment of what we ourselves, between intuition and knowledge, longed for and strived for" ("Verkörperung dessen, was wir selbst, zwischen Ahnung und Erkenntnis, ersehnten und erstrebten"). In the same year he was awarded the Goethe-Medaille für Kunst und Wissenschaft (Goethe Medal for Art and Science) and the Ring of Honour of the City of Vienna.

Millenkovich died in Baden bei Wien on 5 February 1945 and was buried in the Vienna Central Cemetery (group 15H, row 2, number 27).

== Works (selection) ==
- Max Morold: Anton Bruckner. Leipzig 1912 (2nd edn. 1920) (online version)
- Max von Millenkovich-Morold: afterword to Ferdinand von Saar's Herr Fridolin und sein Glück. Reclams Universalbibliothek 7583, Leipzig 1944, pp. 64–79
- Max von Millenkovich-Morold: Vom Abend zum Morgen. Aus dem alten Österreich ins neue Deutschland, Mein Weg als österreichischer Staatsbeamter und deutscher Schriftsteller, Reclam, Leipzig 1940
