= Adolf Michael Boehm =

Austrian painter and graphic artist

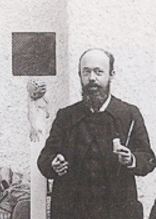
Adolf Michael Boehm

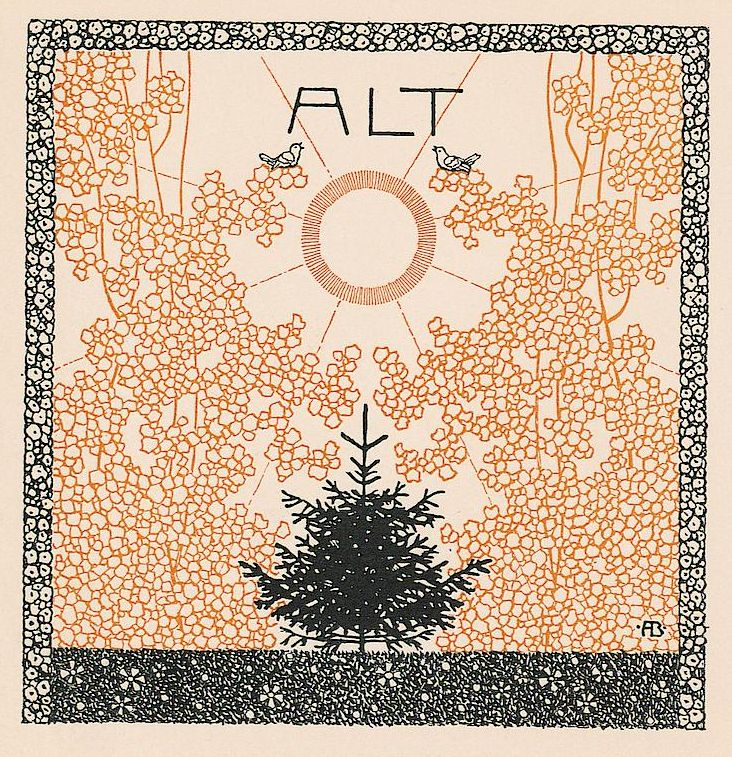
Alt

Adolf Michael Boehm (25 February 1861, Vienna – 20 February 1927, Klosterneuburg) was an Austrian painter and graphic artist.

== Life ==
Boehm studied at the Academy of Fine Arts, Vienna. He was a founding member of the Vienna Secession, sitting on its working committee in 1898, and publishing work in the magazine Ver Sacrum, but left the group in 1905. He then took part in the founding of the Klosterneuburger Künstlerbund, and provided support to Egon Schiele. From 1910 to 1925 he was the professor of nudes and nature studies at the Vienna Kunstgewerbeschule. He also performed graphic design, illustrated books and designed furniture and ceramics. His works show a distinctive ornamental style.

== Works ==
- Autumn landscape in the Vienna woods, glass mosaic for Otto Wagner's villa, 1899.
