= Otto Prutscher =

Austrian architect and designer

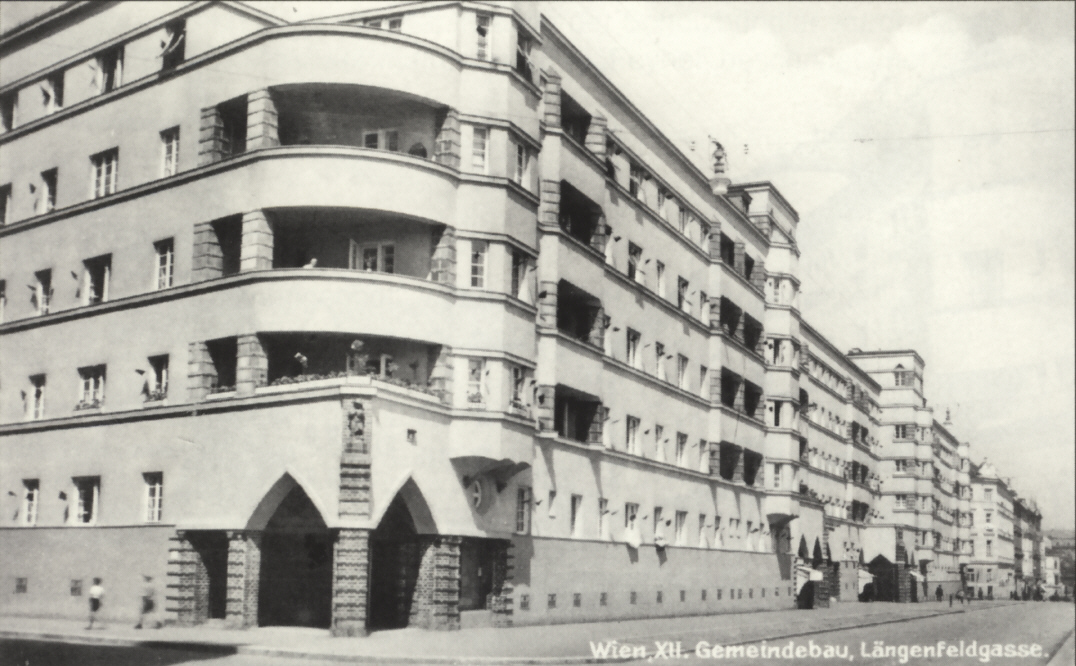
Lorenshof apartment complex, Vienna, 1927

Otto Prutscher (7 April 1880, Vienna — 15 February 1949, Vienna) was an Austrian architect and designer who worked in the Vienna Secession style. His design work was exhibited at the 1900 Paris Exposition and the 1902 Turin Exposition.
