= Franz Theodor Csokor =

Austrian author and dramatist

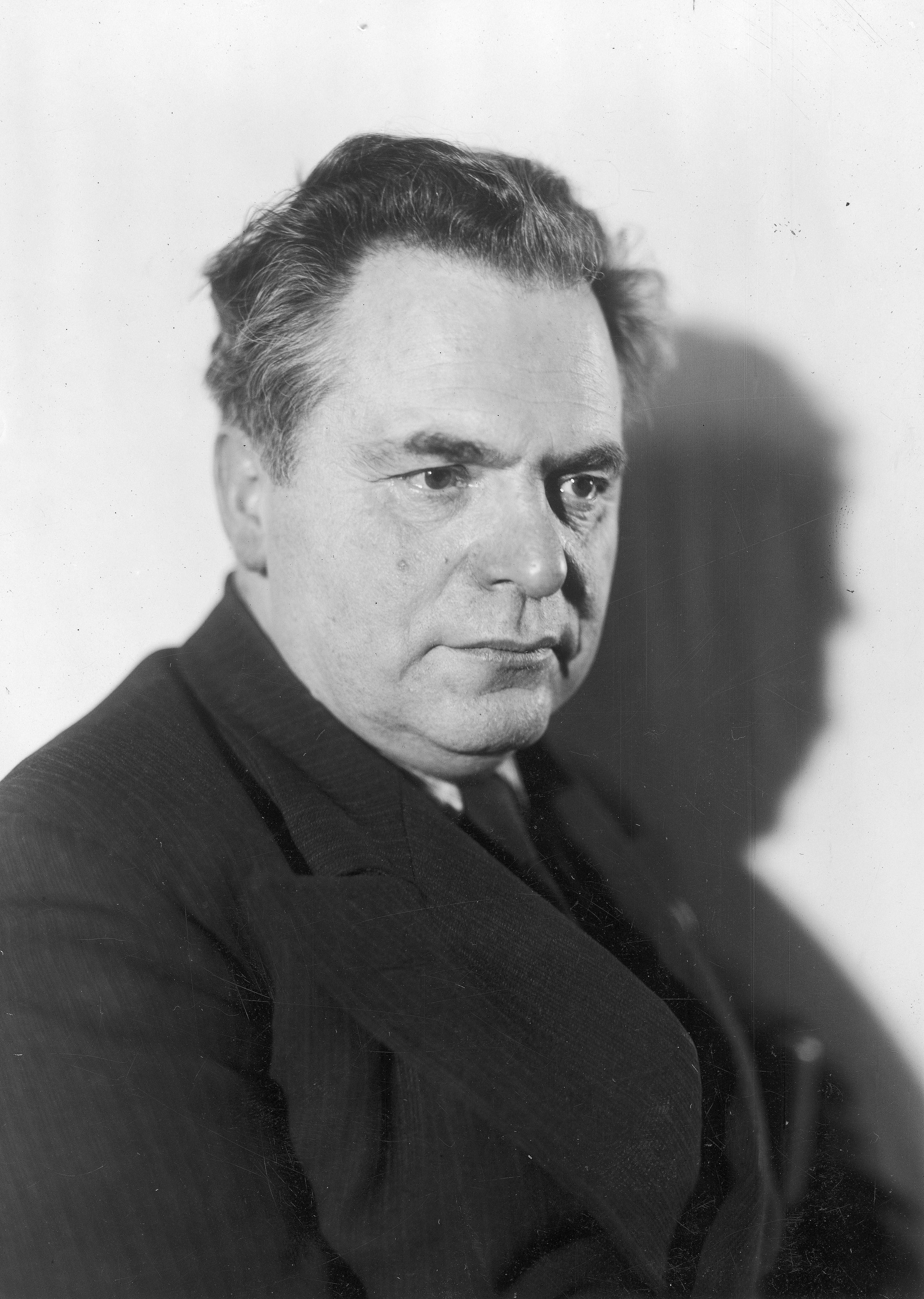
- Csokor in 1938
- Born: 6 September 1885 Vienna, Austria-Hungary
- Died: 5 January 1969 (aged 83) Vienna, Austria
- Resting place: Wiener Zentralfriedhof
- Language: German
- Genre: Drama, prose, poetry
- Literary movement: Expressionism
- Years active: 1905–1969

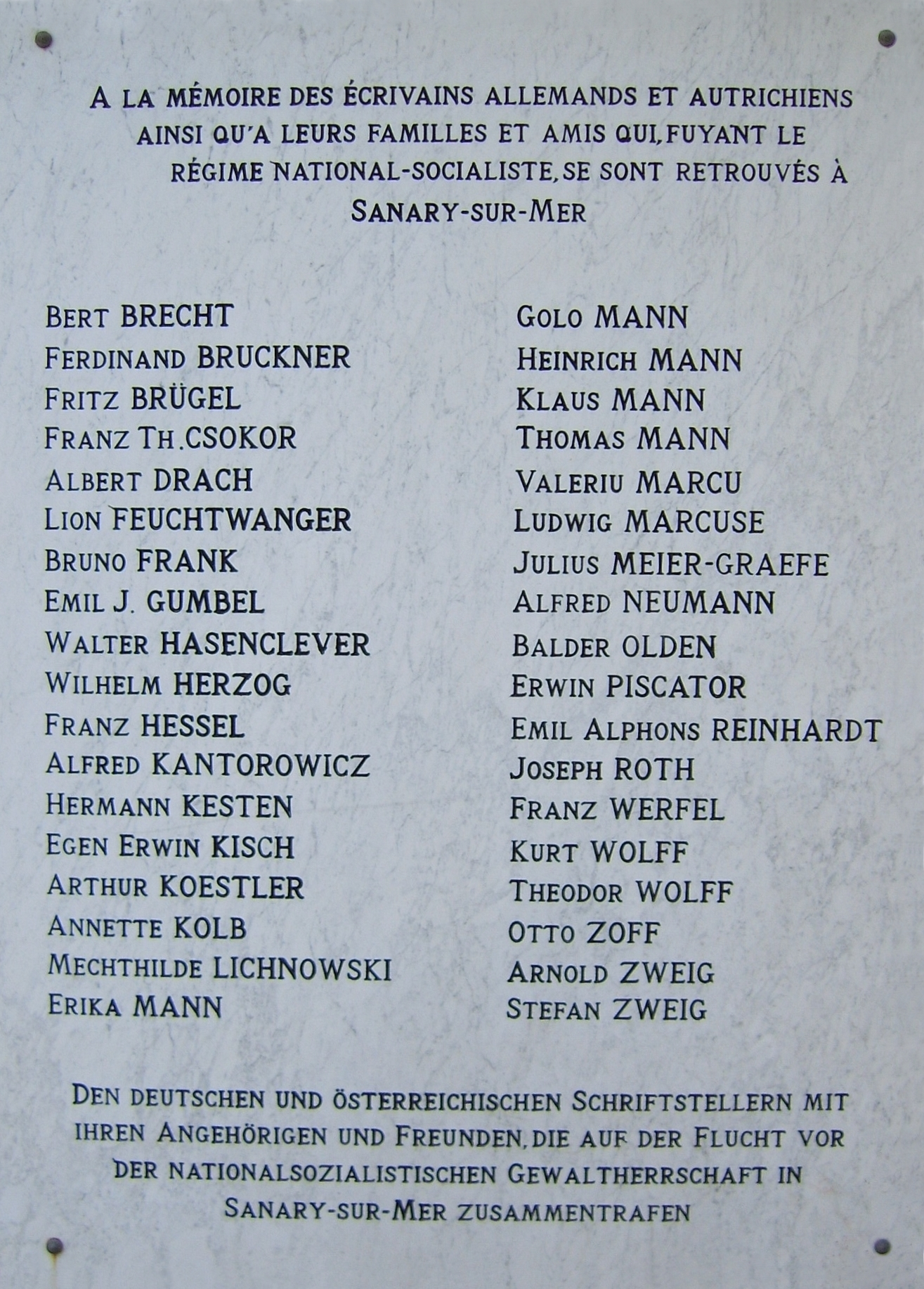
Memorial tablet for German and Austrian refugees in Sanary-sur-Mer, France, among them Franz Theodor Csokor

Franz Theodor Csokor (6 September 1885 – 5 January 1969) was an Austrian author and dramatist, particularly well known for his expressionist dramas. His most successful and best-known piece is 3. November 1918, about the downfall of the Austro-Hungarian monarchy. In many of his works, Csokor deals with themes of antiquity and Christianity.

== Life ==
Csokor was born into a respectable middle-class family in Vienna; the name Csokor is Hungarian and means "bunch [of flowers]". In his youth, he began studying courses in art history, but dropped out. From early on he felt a calling to be a dramatist, and composed his first pieces before World War I. Csokor spent 1913–14 in Saint Petersburg, where he was drafted as a soldier in the war. He would later be employed at the Austrian War Archives in Vienna. From 1922 to 1928, Csokor worked as a dramaturge at the Raimundtheater and the Deutsches Volkstheater in Vienna.

From 1933, he was a convinced opponent of National Socialism; he was among the signatories of a statement against National Socialism at the PEN congress in Dubrovnik of that year. In 1938, after the annexation of Austria to Nazi Germany, he emigrated voluntarily. He spent World War II in Poland, Romania and Hungary before ending up in Italy after the fall of Mussolini in 1944, where he lived in Rome. There, he worked for the BBC. Despite travel restrictions in place at the time, Csokor returned to Vienna in 1946, dressed in a British uniform.

During the Allied occupation of Austria which lasted until 1955, Csokor settled in the British sector of Vienna, working as a freelance journalist for newspapers such as the Wiener Zeitung. In 1947, he became president of the Austrian PEN Club, in which he remained an active member until well into his old age; in 1968, he became vice-president of International PEN. After his death, the Austrian PEN Club named a literary award, the Franz-Theodor-Csokor-Preis, after him in 1970.

A convinced humanist, Csokor spoke up in his dramas for peace, freedom and human rights. His creative life was also closely connected with the labour movement. He died in Vienna in 1969, and is buried in a grave of honour in the Zentralfriedhof. The Csokorgasse, a street in Vienna, was named after him in 1975. In 1994, the Austrian Post Office published a special stamp in his honour.

== Decorations and awards ==
- 1937 – Golden Laurel of the Warsaw Academy of Letters
- 1937 – Gold Cross of Merit (Poland)
- 1937 – Ring of Honour of the Vienna Burgtheater
- 1938 – Grillparzer Prize
- 1953 – Literary Prize of the City of Vienna
- 1954 – Member of the German Academy for Language and Literature
- 1955 – Ring of Honour of the City of Vienna
- 1955 – Grand Austrian State Prize for Literature
- 1960 – Golden Pen
- 1961 – Honorary Member of the Concordia Press Club
- 1965 – Austrian Decoration for Science and Art

== Works ==
=== Drama ===
- Die rote Straße, 1918
- Die Stunde des Absterbens, 1919
- Gesellschaft der Menschenrechte, 1929
- Besetztes Gebiet, 1930
- 3. November 1918, 1936; Ephelant 1993. ISBN 3-900766-07-X.
- Gottes General, 1939; Ephelant 1993. ISBN 3-900766-07-X.
- Kalypso, 1942
- Der verlorene Sohn, 1943; Ephelant 1993. ISBN 3-900766-07-X.
- Cäsars Witwe, 1954
- Pilatus, 1954
- Hebt den Stein ab, 1957
- Jadwiga, 1966
- Der tausendjährige Traum, 1966
- Alexander, 1969
- Der Kaiser zwischen den Zeiten, 1969

=== Prose ===
- Hildebrands Heimkehr, eine deutsche Sage, 1905
- Schuß ins Geschäft (Der Fall Otto Eißler), 1925
- Über die Schwelle, short stories, 1937
- Der Schlüssel zum Abgrund, novel, 1955
- Der zweite Hahnenschrei, short stories, 1959
- Ein paar Schaufeln Erde, short stories, 1965
- Auch heute noch nicht an Land. Briefe und Gedichte aus dem Exil. With Das schwarze Schiff and Zeuge einer Zeit. Ephelant 1993. ISBN 3-900766-05-3.

=== Poetry ===
- Die Gewalten, 1912
- Der Dolch und die Wunde, 1917
- Ewiger Aufbruch, 1926
- Das schwarze Schiff, 1945, 1947; 1993
- Immer ist Anfang, 1952

=== Autobiography ===
- Als Zivilist im polnischen Krieg, Allert de Lange, Amsterdam 1940
- Als Zivilist im Balkankrieg, Ullstein, Vienna 1947
  - new edition ed. Franz Richard Reiter. Ephelant, Vienna 2000. ISBN 3-900766-12-6
- Auf fremden Straßen, Desch, Vienna 1955
- Zeuge einer Zeit: Briefe aus dem Exil 1933–1950, Langen-Müller, Munich 1955
- Autobiographical sketch by Franz Theodor Csokor, ca. 1914 for Franz Brümmer; In: Digital Edition of the lexicographic papers from the literary estate of Franz Brümmer
