= Federal Theatre (Austria) =

- Headquarters: Vienna, Austria
- Number of employees: 2500

The Federal Theatre (German - Bundestheater) is the umbrella organisation for all state-run theatres in Austria, including the Vienna State Opera, the Vienna Volksoper and the Burgtheater (with its smaller houses the Akademietheater and the Kasino am Schwarzenbergplatz), the Vienna State Ballet and organisational companies. With 2,500 employees, it is argued to be the largest theatrical concern in the world.
