= Virtual exchange =

Virtual exchange (also referred to as online intercultural exchange among other names) is an instructional approach or practice for language learning. It broadly refers to the "notion of 'connecting' language learners in pedagogically structured interaction and collaboration" through computer-mediated communication for the purpose of improving their language skills, intercultural communicative competence, and digital literacies. Although it proliferated with the advance of the internet and Web 2.0 technologies in the 1990s, its roots can be traced to learning networks pioneered by Célestin Freinet in 1920s and, according to Dooly, even earlier in Jardine's work with collaborative writing at the University of Glasgow at the end of the 17th to the early 18th century.

Virtual exchange is recognized as a field of computer-assisted language learning as it relates to the use of technology in language learning. Outside the field of language education, this type of pedagogic practice is being used to internationalize the curriculum and offer students the possibility to engage with peers in other parts of the world in collaborative online projects.

Virtual exchange is based on sociocultural views of learning inspired by Vygotskian theories of learning as a social activity.

== Terms and definitions ==
Different names have been used to describe the practice, ranging from terms that usually describe a particular practice within the area, such as dual language virtual exchange which is sometimes called teletandem, eTandem, and tandem language learning, to more generic terms such as globally virtual connections, online interaction and exchange, online intercultural exchange, online exchange, virtual exchange, virtual connections, global virtual teams, globally-networked learning environments, collaborative online international learning (COIL), Internet-mediated intercultural foreign language education. globally networked learning, telecollaboration, and telecollaboration 2.0. Currently, it appears that virtual exchange is the most prominent umbrella term, a term that can be used for a variety of models and practices.

Likewise, depending on the aims and settings a variety of definitions have been applied to the practice. One of the most widely referenced definitions comes from Julie Belz, who defines it as a partnership in which "internationally-dispersed learners in parallel language classes use Internet communication tools such as e-mail, synchronous chat, threaded discussion, and MOOs (as well as other forms of electronically mediated communication), in order to support social interaction, dialogue, debate, and intercultural exchange." As the practice is most common in language learning contexts, narrower definitions appeared as well, such as an "Internet-based intercultural exchange between people of different cultural/national backgrounds, set up in an institutional context with the aim of developing both language skills and intercultural communicative competence... through structured tasks."

Conversely, broader definitions that go beyond educational contexts emerged as well, such as "the process of communicating and working together with other people or groups from different locations through online or digital communication tools (e.g., computers, tablets, cellphones) to co-produce a desired work output. Telecollaboration can be carried out in a variety of settings (classroom, home, workplace, laboratory) and can be synchronous or asynchronous."

== History ==
The origins of virtual exchange have been linked to the work of iEARN and the New York/Moscow Schools Telecommunications Project (NYS-MSTP) which was launched in 1988 by Peter Copen and the Copen Family Fund. This project stemmed from a perceived need to connect youth from the two countries during a time which was marked by tensions between the United States and the U.S.S.R. that had developed during the Cold War. With the institutional support of the Academy of Sciences in Moscow, and the New York State Board of Education, a pilot programme between 12 schools in each nation was established. Students worked in both English and Russian on projects based on their curricula, which had been designed by participating teachers. The program expanded in the early 1990s to include China, Israel, Australia, Spain, Canada, Argentina, and the Netherlands. The early 1990s saw the establishment of the organization iEARN which became officially established in 1994. One of the earliest projects, which is still running, was Margaret Riel's Learning Circles. The organization has since expanded and is currently active in over 100 countries and promotes many different projects, also in collaboration with other organizations such as The My Hero Project. This form of education which aims to integrate awareness of international communities as part of the curriculum is sometimes referred to as global education.

In foreign language education the practice of virtually connecting learners is also commonly called Virtual Exchange but has sometimes been known as telecollaboration and is a sub-field of computer-assisted language learning (CALL). It was first promoted as a form of network-based language learning in the 1990s through the work of educators such as Mark Warschauer and Rick Kern. One of the first uses of the word telecollaboration was in Warschauer's 1996 volume that compiled works on computer-mediated communication (CMC) following the Symposium on Local and Global Electronic Networking in Foreign Language Learning and Research held at the University of Hawaiʻi in 1995. The symposium brought together educators concerned with these issues from university and secondary education throughout the world. Telecollaborative practices at the time involved the use of e-mail and other Web 1.0 capabilities.

Several different models of virtual exchange / telecollaboration have since been developed, such as the Cultura model, developed in 1997 at MIT in the United States, and the dual language virtual exchange / eTandem model. The Cultura project was originally developed as a bilingual project for French and English, but has since been developed in several different languages.

In 2003 the organization Soliya was founded by Lucas Welch and Liza Chambers in the aftermath of the September 11 attacks. Soliya's Connect Program has become an important model of online facilitated dialogue and is based on principles of intergroup dialogue and peacebuilding. In this model of virtual exchange, students from universities across the globe are placed in diverse groups of 10–12 people, and they meet regularly for 2-hour sessions of dialogue through an over a period of 8 weeks. Each group is supported by one or two trained facilitators.

In 2004 the International Virtual Exchange Project (IVEProject) was begun by Eric Hagley. In 2015 this project was sponsored by a Japanese government kaken grant which allowed it to expand greatly. The project has students studying foreign languages under the tutelage of teachers interact asynchronously and synchronously using the language they are studying. The most common exchange is done in English as the Lingua Franca. As of August 2024, over 60,000 students from 29 countries have participated.

In 2005 the European Commission established the eTwinning programme for schools. The programme promotes projects between schools in Europe which entail both synchronous and asynchronous collaborations between classes, offering a safe platform for staff (teachers, head teachers, librarians, etc.) working in a school in one of the European countries involved. Teachers who register in eTwinning are checked by the National Support Organisation (NSO) and are validated in order to use all eTwinning features such as TwinSpace and Project Diary, providing a safe and GDPR compliant environment for students and teachers' interaction.

As per 2021, there are 122,134 active projects with 937,761 teachers in 217,830 schools in eTwinning countries as well as e-Twinning plus countries (Armenia, Azerbaijan, Georgia, Jordan, Lebanon, Republic of Moldova and Ukraine). A key element of eTwinning is collaboration among teachers, students, schools, parents, and local authorities. In eTwinning teachers organize activities that enable young learners to engage in communicative interaction with peers from other linguistic and cultural backgrounds in order to practise and further develop their intercultural communicative competence in their respective foreign (target) language. Students have an active role in co-creating the learning experience by interacting, investigating and making decisions whilst respecting each other thus learning 21st century skills. The use of TwinSpace facilitates a multimodal approach to collaboration which integrates tools to ensure communicative and pedagogic diversity and richness. eTwinning has established a strong community of teachers and organizes training for them.

In 2006 the SUNY Center for Collaborative Online International Learning (COIL) was established at SUNY's Purchase College. COIL developed from the work of faculty members who used technology to bring international students into their classrooms using technology. COIL's Founding Director was Jon Rubin, a film and new media professor at Purchase College. The COIL model is increasingly being recognized as a way for universities to internationalize their curricula. In 2010 COIL joined the new SUNY Global Center in New York City and continued to expand its global network.

In 2011 the Virtual Exchange Coalition was established in the united states to further the field of virtual exchange, bringing together important virtual exchange providers.

The 1st International Conference on Telecollaboration in University Foreign Language Education was hold at the University of León in February, 2014. It provided a broad overview of linguistic and intercultural telecollaboration and generated interest in how telecollaboration can contribute to general educational goals and digital literacies in higher education.

In 2016 members of the INTENT consortium working in different disciplines in higher education around the globe launched the UNICollaboration platform at the Second Conference on Telecollaboration in Higher Education at Trinity College, Dublin. The aim was to support university educators and mobility coordinators to find partner classes, and to organise and run online intercultural exchanges for their students. This platform was one of the outputs of an EU-funded project and has over 1000 registered educators.

In 2016 the European Commissioner for Education, Culture, Youth and Sport Tibor Navracsics announced a future Erasmus+ Virtual Exchange initiative. In March 2018 the Erasmus+ Virtual Exchange pilot project was officially launched by Commissioner Navracsics and it targeted young people (aged 18–30) in EU and Southern Mediterranean countries. In the initial year of EVE, 7,450 participants were involved in virtual exchange through different activities, each with several subprogrammes. An impact report was published in 2018 evaluating the Erasmus+ Virtual Exchange project activities which ran from 1 January 2018 to 31 December 2018, and the effectiveness of the different models of Virtual Exchange in meeting the objectives set by the European Commission (EC). The initiative is hosted on the European Youth Portal. Different models of virtual exchange are promoted on the platform as well as training for educators to develop their own virtual exchange projects and training for young people to become Erasmus+ Virtual Exchange facilitators.

Several VE projects under Erasmus+ Key Action 3 (Support for policy reform, Priority 5, EACEA 41/2016) have focused since then in telecollaboration and virtual exchange practice and research. An example is the EVOLVE project (Evidence-Validated Online Learning through Virtual Exchange) which promotes virtual exchange as an innovative form of collaborative international learning across disciplines in higher education (HE) institutions in Europe and beyond. The project investigated the impact of virtual exchange on teachers' pedaogogical competences and pedagogical approach in HE from 1 January 2018 to 31 December 2020 and it was coordinated by the University of Groningen, the Netherlands.

In 2018, several higher education institutions active in the field of virtual exchange and an international virtual exchange coalition was created that started organizing international virtual exchange conferences (IVEC). The first such conference was scheduled for October 2019 in Tacoma, WA, US. This inaugural IVEC 2019 conference, entitled "Advancing the field of online international learning", was co-organized by the SUNY COIL Center, DePaul University, Drexel University, East Carolina University, University of Washington Bothell, University of Washington Tacoma, and UNIcollaboration.

== Telecollaboration 2.0 ==
Guth and Helm (2010) built on the pedagogy of telecollaboration by expanding on its traditional practices via incorporating Web 2.0 tools in online collaborative projects. This enriched practice widely became known as telecollaboration 2.0. Telecollaboration 2.0, being a completely new phase, serves to achieve nearly the same goals of telecollaboration. A distinctive feature of telecollaboration 2.0, however, lies in prioritizing promoting the development and mastery of new online literacies. Although telecollaboration and telecollaboration 2.0 are used interchangeably, the latter slightly differs in affording "a complex context for language education as it involves the simultaneous use and development" of intercultural competencies, internationalizing classrooms and promoting authentic intercultural communication among partnering schools and students.

== Models ==
There are several different 'models' of Virtual Exchange / telecollaboration which have been extensively described in the literature. The first models to be developed were based on the partnering of foreign language students with "native speakers" of the target language, usually by organizing exchanges between two classes of foreign language students studying one another's languages. The most well established models are the lingua franca virtual exchange, dual language virtual exchange / eTandem, the Cultura, and eTwinning models.

Lingua Franca models have developed due to the increased use of particular languages in international business, science and politics. The most common are the English as Lingua Franca Virtual Exchange (ELFVE) and Spanish as Lingua Franca Virtual Exchange (SLFVE). This type of virtual exchange is now widely adopted by teachers who want their students to participate in international communities but know their students, who often do not have the socio-economic opportunities to do so, have little chance of physically traveling outside their regions. Teachers create tasks and opportunities for their students to use the language they are studying to interact with and learn from peers in other countries. Though not included in the table below the strengths of the LFVE model are that students are in language partnerships without power imbalances, are able to interact with peers from multiple different cultures, see the language they are studying from the perspective of others who are studying it and have more opportunities to use the language they are studying in real-world situations. Some believe the weakness of this model is that students see peers who are also studying the language as not being "ideal" and that there is the possibility of learning mistaken language use.

Dual language virtual exchange (DLVE) / eTandem, which developed from the face to face tandem learning approach, has been widely adopted by individual learners who seek partners on the many available educational websites which offer to help find partners and suggest activities for tandem partners to engage in. However, the DLVE / eTandem model has also been used for class-to-class telecollaboration projects where teachers establish specific objectives, tasks, and topics for discussion. The teletandem model is based on DLVE and was developed in Brazil, but focuses on oral communication through VOIP tools such as Skype and Google Hangouts. Until recent years, however, virtual exchange has had to use asynchronous communication tools.

The Cultura project was developed by teachers of French as a foreign language at MIT in the late 1990s with the aim of making culture the focus of their foreign language class. This model takes its inspiration from the words of the Russian philosopher Mikhail Bakhtin: "It is only in the eyes of another culture that foreign culture reveals itself fully and profoundly ... A meaning only reveals its depths once it has encountered and come into contact with another foreign meaning" (as cited in Furstenberg, Levet, English, & Maillet, 2001, p. 58). Cultura is based on the notion and process of cultural comparison and entails students analysing cultural products in class with their teachers and interacting with students of the target languages and cultures through which they develop a deeper understanding of each other's culture, attitudes, representations, values, and frames of reference.

The eTwinning project, which essentially is a network of schools and educators within the European Union and part of Eramus+, contrasts with its earlier counterparts in not setting specific guidelines apropos of language use, themes or structure. This model serves as a broad platform for schools within the EU to exchange information and share materials online, and provides a virtual space for countless pedagogical opportunities where teachers and students collectively learn, communicate and collaborate using a foreign language. Quintessentially, eTwinning has the following four objectives:

1. setting up a collaborative network among European schools by connecting them via Web 2.0 tools
2. encouraging educators and students to collaborate with their counterparts in other European countries
3. fostering a learning environment in which European identity is integrated with multilingualism and multiculturalism
4. continuously developing educators' professional skills "in the pedagogical and collaborative use of ICT.

eTwinning has thus proven to be a strong model for telecollaboration in recent years, since it enables the authentic use of foreign language among virtual partners, i.e. teachers and students. Not surprisingly, eTwinning projects have become increasingly recognized at various educational institutions across the continent. Each of the telecollaborative models discussed above has its strengths and weaknesses:

	DLVE/eTandem	Cultura	eTwinning
Strengths	Utilizes the native speakers' voices, making it a fundamental part of the language learning process; Fosters independent learning; prioritizes learner autonomy; Promotes reciprocal dependence and mutual support among partners; Establishes a social platform or context for real-life communication and interaction that require higher mental and cognitive skills	Provides learners with an opportunity to have clearer conceptions about other cultures; Promotes cross-cultural understanding and challenges or rejects stereotypes; Presents a flexible and well-structured model for telecollaboration practice.	Offers an opportunity for European schools to work collaboratively with counterparts; Helps students to expand their knowledge of other European cultures and languages; Comprises linguistic components irrespective of the subject matter; Motivates teachers and students to develop their intercultural competency and ICT skills; Adds a new dimension to teaching and encourages them to develop their communication skills.
Weaknesses	Encompasses variations among partners in terms of levels of enthusiasm, interests and attitude; Organization choices, such as mismatching groups, may lead to some problems, e.g. when peers choose their partners rather than teachers partnering students, or in some cases having unmatched learner in one of the groups; Linguistic issues, such mismatching levels, may hinder the effectiveness of synchronous interactions and work against the success of eTandem.	Requires a greater deal of coordination between the two partnering institutions; There are risks associated with misinterpreting cultures, such as: 1. Students may overgeneralize and form rigid opinions when misinterpreting cultures; 2. Differences between cultures may become pivotal, and students may fail to note any existing similarities; 3. A certain bias might be noticed in students' responses, given the fact that they might see themselves representatives of their cultures.	Various issues may arise as a result of: Differences in curricula and syllabuses in partnering schools; Insufficient collaboration between collaborating teachers or students; Varied levels of motivation among partners; Mixed levels of language proficiency; Inadequacy of equipment in schools, insufficient technical support or know-how.

Virtual exchange is a type of education program that uses technology to allow geographically separated people to interact and communicate. This type of activity is most often situated in educational programs (but is also found in some youth organizations) in order to increase mutual understanding, global citizenship, digital literacies, and language learning. Models of virtual exchange are also known as telecollaboration, online intercultural exchange, globally networked teaching and learning, collaborative online international learning (COIL). Non-profit organizations such as Soliya (founded by Lucas Welch) and the Sharing Perspectives Foundation have designed and implement virtual exchange programs in partnership with universities and youth organizations.

In 2017 the European Commission celebrated 30 years of Erasmus mobility and declared Erasmus+ as its most successful programme in terms of European integration and international outreach. In 2018, the Erasmus+ Virtual Exchange (EVE) project was launched; a pilot project part of the Erasmus+ programme, with the aim to provide technology-led intercultural learning experiences for young people aged 18–30 in youth organisations and universities Europe and Southern Mediterranean countries.

Educational institutions such as State University of New York's COIL Center and DePaul University use virtual exchange in higher education curricula to connect young people globally with a primary mission to help them grow in their understanding of each other's contexts (society, government, education, religion, environment, gender issues, etc.).

== Challenges ==
The complexities of the objectives of virtual exchange / telecollaboration ("telecollaborative tasks can and should integrate the development of language, intercultural competence, and online literacies") can generate a series of challenges for educators and learners. O'Dowd and Ritter categorized potential reasons for failed communication in telecollaborative projects, sub-dividing them into four levels which, as the researchers indicate, can also overlap and interrelate:

- individual
- class
- socio-institutional
- interactional

=== At the individual level ===
O'Dowd and Ritter focus initially on the individual level of possible obstacles to full functionality in virtual exchange projects, specifically the psychobiographical and educational backgrounds of the virtual exchange partners as potential sources for dysfunctional communications, and in particular, on the following two primary aspects:

==== Intercultural communicative competences ====
The concept of intercultural communicative competence (ICC) was established by Byram who stated that there are five dimensions (or '5 savoirs') that make an individual interculturally competent: a combination of skills of interpreting, relating, discovery and interaction, of attitudes, knowledge and critical awareness. Learners who embark on a virtual exchange project with immature intercultural communicative competences may struggle to carry out the tasks usefully.

==== Motivation and expectations regarding participation ====
Dissonance in terms of motivation, commitment levels and expectations are also potential sources of tension for learning partners. For example, long response times can be interpreted as a lack of interest, or short responses as unfriendliness.

=== At the class level ===
==== Teacher–teacher relationship ====
Solid teacher partnerships are essential to the success of virtual exchange and ideally should be constructed before the students embark on the project. According to O'Dowd and Ritter, virtual exchange can be viewed as "a form of virtual team teaching which demands high levels of communication and cooperation with a partner whom they may not have met face to face". Furthermore, since virtual exchange has been devised as a vehicle both for linguistic and intercultural communication, educators as much as students must learn to be 'intercultural speakers' (Byram) and avoid culturally inappropriate behaviors, typecasting, culture clashes and misunderstandings.

==== Task design ====
Teachers will be aware of the curricular needs of their own institution, however these are unlikely to match exactly the requirements of their partner institute. The themes and sequencing of the tasks must, therefore, be the result of a compromise which satisfies the curricular needs of both sides. Reaching compromises necessarily implies that the partners be willing to invest time and energy in the demands of planning, and that they are sensitive to the needs of others.

==== Learner-matching procedures ====
Successful pair and group formation is crucial to successful dual language virtual exchange and, to a lesser extent, lingua franca virtual exchange, however factors such as age, gender or foreign language proficiency can impact projects substantially, leading to the difficult choice between leaving pairings and groupings to chance, or assigning partners according to a rationale, however challenging foreseeing compatibilities and incompatibilities might be.

==== Local group dynamics ====
In virtual exchange projects, most of the attention tends to be focused on the online relationships, with the consequent risk of neglecting the local group. The local group is the context within which communication, interaction, negotiation and, thus, a large part of the learning process take place. Consequently, these relationships also require teacher guidance and monitoring.

==== Pre-exchange briefings ====
A comprehensive preparatory phase is an essential element in effective virtual exchange / telecollaborative projects. If teachers can forewarn learners of issues which may arise, they will be better equipped to deal with them and to protect the quality of the exchange. Potentially problematic areas include technical problems, a lack of information about one's partners and their environments, as well as partners' expectations not matching.

=== At the socio-institutional level ===
==== Technology ====
Both the types of available technological tools and access to them can impact the relationship between partners. More sophisticated technological tools on one side can make less well-equipped virtual exchange partners feel at a disadvantage. Moreover, restrictions in accessibility can limit opportunities for partners to interact, with repercussions which can include the risk of giving the false impression of disinterest when a learner with limited technological access is less responsive than a partner who has unlimited access.

==== General organization of the course of study ====
O'Dowd and Ritter include in their list of socio-institutional challenges the organization of the learners' general course of studies, and refer to Belz and Müller-Hartmann's identification of four key areas which can influence the outcome of virtual exchanges / telecollaborations:

- differences in academic calendars
- differences in assessment modalities
- differences in the educational background of the teachers and in their aims
- differences in student contact hours and in the university infrastructure

These differences can greatly affect the outcome of a project, as they can generate differing expectations regarding the volume of work, the meeting of deadlines, and so forth. O'Dowd and Ritter also indicate the pairing of students whose main focus of academic interest may not be the same as a possible source of dysfunction, in addition to the impact of clashes of institutional policies and philosophies regulating all aspects of the learning and teaching processes.

==== Differences in prestige values of cultures and languages ====
In sociolinguistics, the concept of prestige refers to the regard accorded certain languages or forms of the same language, such as dialects. Since virtual exchange involves intercultural communicative competences as much as purely linguistic skills, O'Dowd and Ritter remind us that virtual exchange / telecollaborative interactions can be negatively affected by prestige-based attitudes both to language and culture, which in turn can lead to the ranking of one language and culture over the other, with repercussions on the virtual exchange partnership.

For dual language virtual exchange, a related problem is how native speakers of English tend to be presented as "language experts", while non-native speakers are "learners" who need exposure to native English. This approach assumes that native English will facilitate mutual understanding in most types of communicative situations. However, the use of idiomatic British English or American English might cause several comprehension problems to non-native speakers who typically use English as a lingua franca (ELF), a different function of English.

While non-native speakers will try to accommodate native speakers, native speakers should also try to understand how ELF works and accommodate non-native speakers. Native speakers might be experts in idiomatic English (American, British, Australian, etc.), but non-native speakers are also experts when it comes to using ELF. The two groups of speakers can certainly learn from one another.

When two groups of students participate in dual language virtual exchange projects, it is wise to avoid positioning native speakers as authoritative language experts whose main role is to coach or tutor non-native speakers.

=== At the interactional level ===
At this level, cultural differences relative to communicative behaviors, such as attitudes to small talk, can cause misunderstanding and impact virtual exchanges. According to O'Dowd and Ritter these interactional divergences can occur within the following communicative domains:

- Illocutionary (the intention behind utterances such as promising, threatening or requesting)
- Discourse (features of contextualized language use, such as the setting, voice pitch, style or posture)
- Participation (how the communications are organized in terms of turn-taking, speed of responses, and so forth)
- Stylistic (tone and register, including the appropriateness of humor, slang or formal lexis)
- Nonverbal (in telecollaboration this refers to the area of compensatory modes of expression as substitutes for missing visual and paralinguistic cues, such the posting of emoticons)

== Emerging trends and research ==
Virtual exchange has evolved and become more diversified to reflect not only emerging pedagogies and technologies over time but it has also adapted to reflect the changing globalized world. It is becoming recognized as a sustainable approach to global citizenship education and a form of 'internationalization at home'

=== Role in language and skills development ===
A considerable amount of research points to the benefits of virtual exchange or telecollaboration partnering. Not only do these partnerships improve linguistic competence, they also develop higher-order thinking skills and contribute to the development of cross-cultural attitudes, knowledge, skills, and awareness. Moreover, virtual exchange activities develop digital literacies as well various multiliteracies.

Recent years have also witnessed the emergence of partners using a foreign language such as English not only with native speakers, but also with other non-native speakers as a lingua franca in various virtual exchanges. Studies reveal that these virtual exchanges have equally produced positive results in terms of skills development.

While integration of and research into various virtual exchange partnerships have mainly occurred at universities, what is also emerging is an exploration of virtual exchange integration into secondary language education.

O'Dowd and Lewis report that initially, the majority of online exchanges occurred between Western classrooms based in North America and Europe, while the number of partnerships involving other continents and other languages remained small. This has changed since the development of projects such as iEarn and the International Virtual Exchange Project which includes teachers and students from non-western countries.

=== Evolving models in foreign language education ===
A trend that can be observed is that two models have generally guided the approaches adopted in virtual exchange or telecollaborative practice in foreign language learning. The first model, known as dual language virtual exchange or e-tandem, focuses primarily on linguistic development which generally involves two native speakers of different languages communicating with each other to practise their target language. These partners perform the role of peer-tutors providing feedback to each other and correcting errors in a digital environment. This model also emphasizes learner autonomy where partners are encouraged to take responsibility for creating the structure to the language exchange with minimal intervention from the teacher

The second model, generally referred to as intercultural virtual exchange / telecollaboration, emerged with the pedagogical trends of 1990s and 2000s which placed more emphasis on intercultural and sociocultural elements of foreign language learning. This model differs from dual language virtual exchange / e-tandem in 3 ways:

1. Emphasis is placed on the development of cultural knowledge, cultural awareness and not only on linguistic competence
2. Involvement of structured language programs and class-to-class partnerships rather than add-on or out-of-class exchanges between partners
3. More involvement and facilitation from a teacher

=== New technologies ===
By the end of the 2010s, virtual exchange witnessed a move towards the integration of more informal immersive online environments and Web 2.0 technologies. These tools and environments enabled partners to conduct collaborative tasks reflecting hobbies and interests such as jointly developed music or film projects. Other joint tasks involve website design and development as well as online games and discussion forums. Four major types of technologies dominating virtual exchange practice have been identified by O'Dowd and Lewis:

1. Asynchronous text-based communication
2. Videoconferencing
3. Web 2.0
4. Virtual worlds

The multitude and array of environments have thus provided greater freedom of choice for intercultural virtual exchange partners. Thorne argues that although these may be considered motivating environments, they involve 'intercultural communication in the wild' and are 'less controllable' as a result (p. 144).

The introduction of more structured approaches and frameworks have therefore been witnessed as a trend since the 2010s. The outcome of the INTENT project by the European Commission between 2011 and 2014 led to the creation of the UNICollaboration platform which provides necessary resources for educators to set up structured virtual exchange partnerships in universities. The European Telecollaboration for Intercultural Language Acquisition (TILA) is an example of a platform of resources for teachers dedicated to integrating structured virtual exchange programs into secondary education. The aim of the European project Telecollaboration for Intercultural Language Acquisition (TILA) was to improve the quality of foreign language teaching and learning processes by means of meaningful telecollaboration among peers. The TILA project was funded by the European Commission within the Lifelong Learning Programme (2013–2015) and continues since then. Six countries were represented in the TILA consortium: France, United Kingdom, Germany, Spain, the Netherlands and Czech Republic, and each country collaborated with a secondary school and a (teacher training) university.

TeCoLa was also a project funded by the European Commission within the Erasmus+ programme that harnesses telecollaboration technologies and gamification for intercultural and content integrated foreign language teaching (CLIL). It addressed the emerging need in secondary foreign language education for developing intercultural communicative competence through the pedagogical integration of virtual exchanges and telecollaboration. TeCoLa deployed virtual worlds, videoconferencing tools and gamification to support virtual pedagogical exchanges between secondary school students throughout Europe. The TeCoLa tools include the TeCoLa Virtual World, BigBlueButton video rooms, online tools for communication and collaboration, and Moodle courses for pedagogical exchange management. The project paid special attention to authentic communication practice in the foreign language, intercultural experience, collaborative knowledge discovery in CLIL contexts as well as learning diversity and pedagogical differentiation.

The project ran from 2016 to 2019 and it was coordinated by Utrecht University, the Netherlands, alongside five other project partners: LINK – Linguistik und Interkulturelle Kommunikation (Germany), University of Roehampton (United Kingdom), University of Antwerp (Belgium), University of Valencia (Spain), Transit-Lingua (the Netherlands).

=== Structures and frameworks for integration ===
It is widely recognized that teacher facilitation plays a key role in ensuring the success of virtual exchange partnerships. Teacher-training to integrate successful virtual exchange practice into the classroom has therefore also emerged as a growing trend. Some scholars have advocated for an experiential model approach to training which involves trainee teachers in online exchanges themselves before integrating virtual exchange practice in the classroom. Reports have shown that this approach has impacted positively on successful integration of virtual exchange practice.

The types of tasks in virtual exchange partnerships have also become more structured over time. Research shows that the type of task chosen for the virtual exchange plays an important role in the success of learning outcomes. In earlier telecollaborative projects, the expectation was for partners to develop linguistic and cultural competence by simply connecting with partners of their target language. Exchanges were carried out with little reflection on a participant's own or the target culture. An approach that has therefore been suggested to engage and structure the partnership is a task-based language learning approach which focuses on meaning-oriented activities that reflect the real world.

=== Cross-disciplinary initiatives ===
Among other developments in virtual exchange practice, cross-disciplinary telecollaborative initiatives have seen a steady growth. These partnerships not only enable language skills development and enhance intercultural competence but they also enable different cultural perspectives on certain subject areas such as music, history, anthropology, geography education, business studies, community health nursing, and other subjects. The potential to engage in international transdisciplinary problem-solving offers enormous educational value to develop intercultural and digital competence alongside collaborative research skills.

Collaborative Online International Learning Network (COIL) created by the State University of New York (SUNY) system is an example of a structured initiative that geographically connects distant partner classes for subject-specific collaboration through online and blended courses.

Some of the benefits of virtual exchange include global competency, project-based learning, digital literacy, and intercultural collaboration. Other educators have found that COIL can be an important internationalization initiative in equity that grants access to global and digital learning to all students who may not perform physical mobility because of obstacles due to immigration issues or significant obligations. Research has also shown that such globalized curriculums positively affect the employment status and wage of minority immigrant graduates.

== Online intercultural exchange ==
Online intercultural exchange is an academic field of study connected to virtual exchange. It "involves instructionally mediated processes...for social interaction between internationally distributed partner classes". This activity has its roots in computer-assisted language learning (CALL) and computer-mediated communication. OIE is not restricted to language learning but happens across many educational disciplines where there is a desire to increase the internationalization of teaching and learning.

Developments in communication technologies and the relative ease with which forms of human communication can be technically afforded internationally since the existence of the internet resulted in language teaching experimentation. Connecting individuals, classrooms or groups of students to work together on tasks online involves attempting to arrive at shared understanding through "negotiation of meaning". There is a body of research in the failures and successes of the endeavour which have informed a guide to language teacher practice. The INTENT consortium of researchers, supported by funding from the European Union, promoted awareness of telecollaborative activities in higher education and the contribution made to internationalising the student experience, publishing a report and a position paper. The history of the evolution of this field was described by researcher Robert O'Dowd in his keynote to the European Computer-Assisted Language Learning Conference EUROCALL in 2015. Publications reveal learner perceptions of such activity.

== Distinction from other educational practices ==
Virtual exchange is just one way of using technology in education. However, there is some confusion around the terminology used in this field. Virtual exchange is not distance learning, nor should it be confused with virtual mobility which is more concerned with university students accessing and obtaining credit for taking online courses at universities other than their own. Virtual exchanges are not massive open online courses (MOOCs), because they are not massive. In virtual exchange participants interact in small groups, often using synchronous video conferencing tools.

== See also ==
- Computer-supported collaboration – Field studying how people work in groups with the support of computing systems
