= Wiener Schmäh =

Aspect of Viennese humor

Wiener Schmäh (Viennese Schmäh) refers to a colloquial expression that describes a characteristic aspect of Viennese humor. It does not refer to a singular invective, but rather a style of communication.

== Etymology and Use ==
The German dictionary Duden traces the word Schmäh back to the middle high German smæhe, which means "insult" or "contumely treatment." In Austrian German slang Schmäh means "gimmick," "trick," "swindle" or "falsehood" as well as "compulsory friendliness," "saying" or "joke." According to Peter Wehle, Schmäh is derived from the Yiddish schemá (story, something overheard) whereas Robert Sedlacek suggests an origin in Rotwelsch, in which Schmee means something similar to thieves' cant, lie or joke.

The Variantenwörterbuch des Deutschen (a German dictionary that documents geographical and dialectic differences in the German language) defines Viennese Schmäh as a typically Austrian — often perceived as superficially friendly — charm that is ascribed, especially in Western Austria, to the Viennese. The term is derived from Viennese German and has been carried over into Standard German and even in Germany is sometimes used in the form Wiener Schmäh.

Wiener Schmäh is strongly associated with Austrian cabaret and stand-up comedy. In an article concerning Austrian humor, the German-language newspaper Kurier offered the following anecdote as an example of Schmäh: "A woman died. In front of her open grave stood her husband next to his wife's lover. The lover was completely broken and cried bitterly. The woman's husband laid his arm consolingly across the lover's shoulders and said: 'Don't take it so hard. I'll definitely marry again!'"

When Schmäh is misunderstood, the results can be unappreciated. The late linguist anthropologist Michael Agar in his book, Language Shock: Understanding the Culture of Conversation, mused that Marie Antoinette’s mythical retort to the starving French people, “Let them eat cake” was actually a Schmäh.

== Reception ==
Often Wiener Schmäh is treated as synonymous with Viennese German. It is considered to be subtle, indirect and full of hidden innuendo, sometimes analogous to black humor. The cabaret artist Reinhard Nowak defined Schmäh as a combination of crass and endearing and as an often not earnest form of togetherness. Likewise, cabaret artist Josef Hader suggests that Schmäh unites charm and a certain kind of unfriendliness that are normally incompatible. Michael Agar discusses Schmäh in the book Language Shock, in which he uses it to illustrate his concept of languaculture.

== See also ==
- Black comedy
- Cabaret
- Kabarett
- Wienerlied

== Literature ==
- Irene Suchy, Hubert Christian Ehalt (Hrsg.): Schmäh als ästhetische Strategie der Wiener Avantgarden (= Enzyklopädie des Wiener Wissens. Band XXII). Edition Seidengasse, Bibliothek der Provinz, Weitra 2015, ISBN 978-3-990284-98-8.
