= Grossen =

Grossen is a German surname. Notable people with the surname include:

- Jürg Grossen (born 1969), Swiss politician
- Françoise Grossen (born 1943), Swiss textile artist

== See also ==
- Rossen
