= Intercultural communicative competence in computer-supported collaborative learning =

Internationally dispersed online learning

Intercultural communicative competence in computer-supported collaborative learning is a form of computer-supported collaborative learning (CSCL), applied to intercultural communicative competence (ICC).

== Essential ideas connecting CSCL and ICC ==
One of the well-known applications of CSCL is tele-collaboration involving the use of the internet or other computer-mediated communication tools by internationally dispersed students in order to foster the development of foreign language linguistic and intercultural competence in communication. With the aid of the technological mediation used in tele-collaborative study, participants on each side of the network have cost-effective access to "Languaculture."

Numerous models and theories of intercultural communication have been proposed, including communication accommodation (Giles, 1973), cultural convergence (Barnett & Kincaid, 1983), identity or face negotiation theory (Ting-Toomey, 1993), and interactive acculturation (Bourhis, Moise, Perreault, & Senecal, 1997). A model of ICC (or IC) widely accepted in foreign language education has been proposed by Byram. This model includes five components, all of which are needed for a student to become an "intercultural speaker":

1. attitudes: curiosity and openness, readiness to suspend disbelief about other cultures and belief about one's own.
2. knowledge: of social group and their products and practices in one's own and in one's interlocutor's country, and one of the general processes of societal and individual interaction.
3. skills of interpreting and relating: ability to interpret a document or event from another culture, to explain it and relate it to documents from one's own.
4. skills of discovery and interaction: ability to acquire new knowledge of a culture and cultural practices and the ability to operate knowledge, attitudes and skills under the constraints of real-time communication and interaction.
5. critical awareness or an evaluative orientation: an ability to evaluate critically and on the basis of explicit criteria perspectives, practices and products in one's own and other cultures and countries.

== CSCL affordances for ICC ==
There are benefits as well as challenges for using CSCL as a means of intercultural communication. Research in the field indicates several advantages, including that it:

- Helps build negotiation strategies
- Improves EFL and ESL language skills
- Promotes the idea that learning is fun because:
  - it's a novel way to communicate
  - students view virtual worlds as places where they can take risks and "try on" different faces
- Positively impacts the development of intercultural competence
- Makes face-to-face characteristics (such as age, race, and gender) a non-issue
- Cultivates a "community of learners" despite physical and cultural distance between learners
- Expands knowledge and understanding of other cultures
  - This, in turn, fosters cognitive development as participants' new-found awareness of different perspectives increases their flexibility
- Takes advantage of communication media's increased social sensitivity (compared with printed or electronic one-way broadcast media

== Challenges for ICC within CSCL environments ==
Despite the potential advantages of using CSCL to overcome the barriers of face-to-face prejudice, develop social skills, and increase cognitive flexibility, simply adding CSCL to a communicative situation does not automatically foster trust nor resolve intercultural issues. In fact, research has indicated that some problems are made worse (or at least more obvious) by moving to a computer-supported medium. This includes that:

- Face-to-face conversations always ebb and flow but in the CSCL world, this ebb and flow can be misinterpreted, depending on the intercultural context, as boredom or even anger.
- Even in a synchronous CSCL environment, people are often not as fully engaged because of physical isolation. Consistent and constant clarification of meaning, similar to the interactive process of semantic interoperability in computer systems, is necessary, which is a requirement that prolongs tasks and projects.
- CSCL affords many choices among tools: from asynchronous email and discussion boards to synchronous chat and VoIP to visually present web cams and virtual worlds. However, when intercultural differences are considered the tools are less interchangeable and thus tool selection is more constrained.
- Misunderstandings, including those which arise from intercultural differences, are not recognised (and cleared up) as quickly in CSCL environments.
- Success depends on people feeling part of the group. Unfortunately, bonding and interpersonal ties are more difficult to achieve at a distance, particularly with abstract and lengthy messages, which may be appropriate in some cultures but inappropriate in others.
- Success depends on trust-building, which is difficult to achieve in a computer-mediated environment and may be conducive only to selected intercultural contexts (for example, lack of self-disclosure is viewed as a positive trait in some cultures).
- Because cultural preferences for activity, structure, and style vary among cultures the creation of learning events requires careful consideration and additional design time on the part of the instructor.]
- Hence, comes the need for developing a critical cross-cultural communicative competence in English as a Second/Foreign Language (ESL/EFL) preservice teachers.
- Without a facilitator to invigorate conversations and engage participants communication is likely to decrease in CSCL environments due to the extra effort and extended timeframe required by the additional layer of intercultural communication.

== Pedagogical implications and suggestions for implementation ==
Although there are many benefits to using CSCL, especially in language learning contexts, teachers must approach its adoption with clear goals and objectives. Teachers should select the CSCL medium with careful consideration. In fact, tool selection is critical since different media work well for some people and not for others. In addition, instructors need to be familiar with concepts of intercultural communication in addition to CSCL. In terms of its application CSCL is not appropriate for short-term projects, and teachers should expect to spend a considerable amount of extra management time in roles such as mediators, monitors, and facilitators. Teachers who have little extra time should not implement CSCL.

CSCL requires instructional scaffolding to accommodate different levels of foreign language ability as well as concrete and structured exercises that are built in during the team formation stage. Teachers may have to provide background information to extend their students' understanding of the target culture while also being unafraid to confront negative stereotypes that their students may possess. Despite these challenges, CSCL may prove to be a superior tool through which teachers can foster greater understanding between their students and members of other cultures.
