= Rossen =

Rossen is a surname and given name. Notable people with it include:

== Surname ==
- Carol Rossen (born 1937), American actress
- Daniel Rossen (born 1982), American singer-songwriter
- Kai Rossen, German chemist
- Jeff Rossen (born 1976), American television journalist
- Ivo Rossen (born 1982), Dutch footballer
- Mischa Rossen (born 1972), Dutch sailor
- Robert Rossen (1908–1966), American screenwriter, film director, and producer
- Stig Rossen (born 1962), Danish singer and actor

== Given name ==
- Rossen Petkov
- Rossen Milanov

== See also ==
- F. W. Andreasen–John Rossen House, historical place in California
- Lex van Rossen Award, European musical photography award
- Rössen culture, Central European culture of the middle Neolithic
- Rossens (disambiguation)
