= Computer Space forum =

Art festival

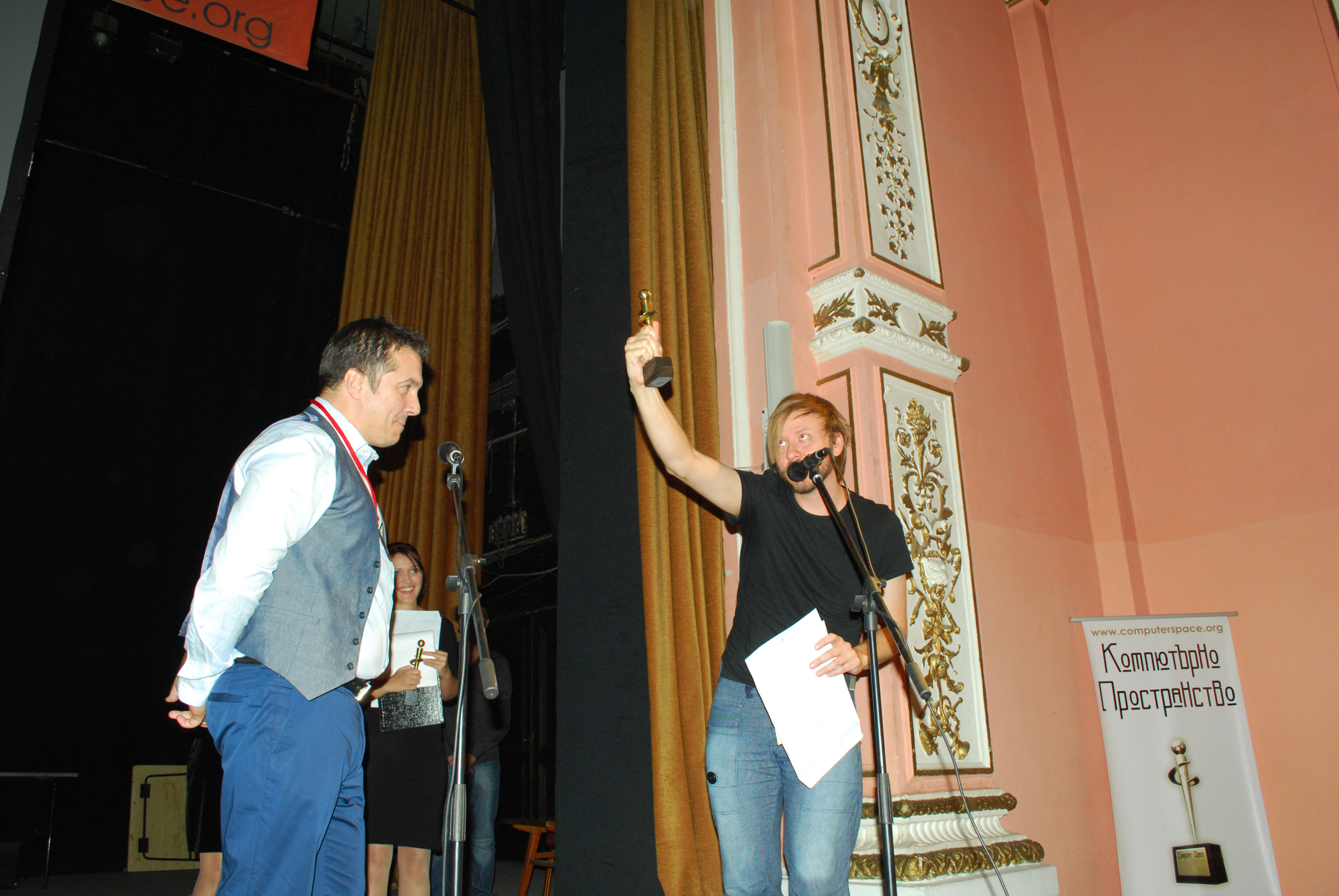
Computer Space 2011 Award Ceremony

Computer Space forum is a yearly computer art festival, organized by the Student Computer Art Society (SCAS) in Sofia, Bulgaria. It's one of the oldest digital art festivals in Bulgaria, founded in 1989.

== Description ==
An international non-commercial event and platform joining young artists, students and producers of computer graphics, computer animation, off-line multimedia, electronic music and web design. Computer Space includes contest and festival part and all the events are free and open to the public especially encouraging the participation of students and young artists. Every year more than 200 projects in the sphere of computer arts have been presented by their authors and discussed. The creative idea, the transformation of the idea to project, the combination of technology and art in the implementation, the society impact of computers have been always a main focus of the symposia in the frame of Computer Space.

== History ==
Starting as an electronic music festival in 1989 Computer Space included graphics and animation sections next few years. Web design and mobile applications have been one of the fast-growing sections last years.

During the 1980s Bulgaria specialized in producing microcomputers in the former communist bloc countries and the Soviet Union specialized in producing big machines and supercomputers. The Eastern bloc countries had the so-called Economic Inter-support Council and in the frame of that Council each country has been developing some economic area. At that time it was not so clear the microcomputers will be the future and some experts believe that the microcomputers are mainly for games and home usage. It happened that in 1981 the first microcomputer in Eastern Europe called Imko II then (in 1982) called Pravetz 82 (with 8 bit processor) has been released in Bulgaria. This was Apple II compatible microcomputer and it came to life just after Apple II.

This situation placed Bulgaria in the leadership role in microcomputers production not only in Eastern Europe but also in the Middle East and even in the Central Europe. A huge plants have been built exporting thousands of Pravetz 82 and later Pravetz 16 (with 8086/88 processor) to all Eastern bloc countries and to Arabic countries. The development of computer industry in that time strongly influenced the development of software and also the development of computer arts. In the beginning of 80's the first analogue synthesiser (produced in Paris and occupying almost one big hall) has been installed in the Bulgarian National Radio and thus giving a strong tool to the electronic music composers from the Balkan region. The own production of EGA and VGA displays in the middle and late 80s pushed the computer graphics and visualization to a new level.

Being a barometer of electronic and computer arts in Sough-Eastern Europe Computer Space forum often offers the artists possibility to debate such fundamental issues as relations between computer arts and other contemporary arts, place of the artists in the creative process, styles in digital arts, technology and society issues etc. Some of the symposium topics like 'The Violence of Information', 'Virtual Identity', 'Computer arts or computers in the arts', 'Art or a design' opened a lot of following discussions in many artistic forums and blogs.

One of the often open questions during the many discussions is the definition of art in the computer generated or manipulated products. For example, some computer graphics like 3D architectural or car images could demonstrate brilliant design technologies and could 'touch' the users emotionally. Is this an art? Or we may see very nice Photoshop made drawings of landscapes or processed photographs. And, another often posed question, the value of such creations, especially in comparison to the value of oil paintings that exist in just one unique copy. These and many similar questions allow the artists to debate the future of the arts and interaction between the arts.

Computer arts have a lot of forms and appearance and this evolution is always been in a focus of CS seminars. Computer graphics, computer animation, multimedia (CD/ DVD based games, encyclopaedia, fairy-tale stories, galleries, training modules etc.), web-art, net-art, electronic/computer music, VRs, interactive art installations and many forms are regarded as computer arts. But, it is always a big discussion when the synthesis of technology and creative ideas becomes an art. And, how to distinguish the art from the brilliant design or from the perfect modelling? Shall we consider the impact and raised emotions as a prove of the artistic elements of some project? And, if and how the entertainment projects (for example, games) could be considered as an art ?

== Reception ==
The event is mentioned regularly in national and international press. In 2003 President of the Republic of Bulgaria awarded the project in the category "Society and Institution web".

A lot of well-known studios and artists from the CS participating with projects over the years, for instance: Braam Jordaan (South Africa), Academy of Media Arts Cologne (Cologne), ZKM (Karlsruhe), IRCAM (Paris), Platige Studio (Poland), Studio Aka (UK), Miralab (Switzerland), Institute for Electroacoustic of Vienna University and many others. Most of them are pioneers of some new methods and technologies in computer arts and modern media. Rossen Petkov is Chairman of the Organising Committee and Computer Space co-founder.
