= Rossens =

Rossens can be either of two municipalities in Switzerland:

- Rossens, Fribourg
- Rossens, Vaud

== See also ==
- Rossen, a surname and given name
