= Milton Gordon =

American sociologist (1918–2019)

Milton Myron Gordon (October 3, 1918 – June 4, 2019) was an American sociologist. He was most noted for having devised a theory on the Seven Stages of Assimilation. He was born in Gardiner, Maine. Gordon died on June 4, 2019, at the age of 100.

1. Acculturation: newcomers adopt language, dress, and daily customs of the host society (including values and norms).
2. Structural assimilation: large-scale entrance of minorities into cliques, clubs and institutions in the host society.
3. Marital assimilation: widespread intermarriage.
4. Identification assimilation: the minority feels bonded to the dominant culture.
5. Attitude reception assimilation refers to the absence of prejudice.
6. Behavior reception assimilation refers to the absence of discrimination.
7. Civic assimilation occurs when there is an absence of value conflicts and power struggles.

== Bibliography ==
- Milton M. Gordon, ed. (1981). America as a multicultural society. Philadelphia : American Academy of Political and Social Science.
- Assimilation in American life: the role of race, religion, and national origins. New York, Oxford University Press. 1964.
- Human nature, class, and ethnicity. New York : Oxford University Press. 1978.
- The Scope of Sociology. New York: Oxford University Press. 1988.
- Assimilation in Native and Immigrant groups, special editor, Andres Suarez, Seminar presented June 9, 2008, London, Ontario
- "Dimensions of Ethnic Assimilation: An Empirical Appraisal of Gordon's Typology". Williams, J. Allen Jr. and Ortega, Suzanne T (1990). Social Science Quarterly, 71, 4, December 1990
- Milton M. Gordon, "The Concept of the Sub-Culture and Its Application", Social Forces Vol. 26, No. 1 (Oct., 1947), pp. 40–42].

== See also ==
- Melting pot
- Immigration
