= Acculturation =

Adjusting to a new cultural environment

Acculturation refers to the psychological, social, and cultural transformation that takes place through direct contact between two cultures, wherein one or both engage in adapting to dominant cultural influences without compromising their essential distinctiveness. It occurs when an individual acquires, adopts, or adjusts to a new cultural environment as a result of being placed into another culture or when another culture is brought into contact. This balancing process can result in a mixed society with prevailing and blended features or with splintered cultural changes, depending on the sociopolitical atmosphere. Individuals from other cultures work toward fitting into a more prevalent culture by selectively integrating aspects of the dominant culture, such as its cultural traits and social norms, while still holding onto their original cultural values and traditions. The impacts of acculturation are experienced differently at various levels by both the adoptees of the mainstream culture and the hosts of the source culture. Outcomes can include marginalization, respectful coexistence, destructive tensions, integration, and cultural evolution.

== Levels and dynamics ==
At a group level, acculturation often results in changes to culture, religious practices, health care, and other social institutions. There are also significant ramifications on the food, clothing, and language of those becoming introduced to the overarching culture.

At the individual level, the process of acculturation refers to the socialization process by which foreign-born individuals blend the values, customs, norms, cultural attitudes, and behaviors of the overarching host culture. This process has been linked to changes in daily behavior, as well as numerous changes in psychological and physical well-being. As enculturation is used to describe the process of first-culture learning, acculturation can be thought of as second-culture learning.

Under natural circumstances which are common in daily life encountered today, acculturation automatically takes a long time spanning several generations. Physical force can be seen in some instances of acculturation, which can cause it to occur more rapidly, but it is not a main component of the process. More commonly, the process occurs through constant pressure and consistent exposure to the more prevalent host culture.

Scholars in different disciplines have developed more than 60 theories of acculturation, though many lack academic rigour in their proposals. Active academic focus on the concept of acculturation began in 1918. As it has been approached from the fields of psychology, anthropology, and sociology at different times, numerous theories and definitions have emerged to describe elements of the acculturative process. Despite definitions and evidence that acculturation is a two-way process of change, theory and research have dealt mainly with the minorities' adaptations and changes such as immigrants, refugees, and indigenous people in response to their contact with the dominant majority. Contemporary research has primarily focused on the various strategies of acculturation within societies, the factors influencing the acculturation process and the individuals involved, and the development of interventions aimed at facilitating smoother transitions.

== Historical approaches ==
The history of Western civilization, and in particular the histories of Europe and the United States, are largely defined by patterns of acculturation.

One of the most notable forms of acculturation is imperialism, the most common progenitor of direct cultural change. Although these cultural changes may seem simple, the combined results are both robust and complex, impacting both groups and individuals from the original culture and the host culture. Acculturation with dominance has been researched by sociologists, anthropologists, and historians virtually only, mostly in a colonialism context, due to the dispersal of western European people all over the world over the last five centuries.

The first psychological theory of acculturation was proposed in W.I. Thomas and Florian Znaniecki's 1918 study, The Polish Peasant in Europe and America. From studying Polish immigrants in Chicago, they illustrated three forms of acculturation corresponding to three personality types: Bohemian (adopting the host culture and abandoning their culture of origin), Philistine (failing to adopt the host culture but preserving their culture of origin), and creative-type (able to adapt to the host culture while preserving their culture of origin). In 1936, Redfield, Linton, and Herskovits provided the first widely used definition of acculturation as:

Those phenomena which result when groups of individuals having different cultures come into continuous first-hand contact, with subsequent changes in the original cultural patterns of either or both groups...under this definition acculturation is to be distinguished from...assimilation, which is at times a phase of acculturation.

Long before efforts toward racial and cultural integration in the United States arose, the common process was assimilation. In 1964, Milton Gordon's book Assimilation in American Life outlined seven stages of the assimilative process, setting the stage for literature on this topic. Later, Young Yun Kim authored a reiteration of Gordon's work, but argued cross-cultural adaptation as a multi-staged process. Kim's theory focused on the unitary nature of psychological and social processes and the reciprocal functional personal environment interdependence. Although this view was the earliest to fuse micro-psychological and macro-social factors into an integrated theory, it was clearly focused on assimilation rather than racial or ethnic integration. In Kim's approach, assimilation is unilinear and the sojourner must conform to the majority group culture in order to be "communicatively competent." According to Gudykunst and Kim (2003) the "cross-cultural adaptation process involves a continuous interplay of deculturation and acculturation that brings about change in strangers in the direction of assimilation, the highest degree of adaptation theoretically conceivable." This view has been heavily criticized, since the biological science definition of adaptation refers to the random mutation of new forms of life, not the convergence of a monoculture (Kramer, 2003).

In opposition to Gudykunst and Kim's adaptive development, Eric M. Kramer developed his Cultural Fusion theory (2011, 2010, 2000a, 1997a, 2000a, 2011, 2012) maintaining clear, conceptual distinctions between assimilation, adaptation, and integration. According to Kramer, assimilation involves conformity to a pre-existing form. Kramer's (2000a, 2000b, 2000c, 2003, 2009, 2011) theory of Cultural Fusion, which is based on systems theory and hermeneutics, argues that it is impossible for a person to unlearn themselves and that by definition, "growth" is not a zero-sum process that requires the disillusion of one form for another to come into being but rather a process of learning new languages and cultural repertoires (ways of thinking, cooking, playing, working, worshiping, and so forth). That is, in Kramer's view, one does not need to unlearn a language to learn another language, or unlearn who he or she is to learn new patterns of dancing, cooking, speaking, etc. Kramer disagrees with Gudykunst and Kim (2003) in saying that this commingling of language and culture generates cognitive complexity, or being able to switch between cultural repertoires. In short, Kramer says that learning is expansion, not unlearning.

== Conceptual models ==
=== Theory of Dimensional Accrual and Dissociation ===
Although different acculturation models can be differentiated, the most complete models take into account change occurring in both groups as well as among the members of these interacting groups. To understand acculturation at the group level, one must first look at the nature of both cultures before coming into contact with one another. A useful approach is Eric Kramer's theory of Dimensional Accrual and Dissociation (DAD). Two fundamental premises in Kramer's DAD theory are the concepts of hermeneutics and semiotics, which infer that identity, meaning, communication, and learning all depend on differences or variance. According to this view, total assimilation would result in a monoculture void of personal identity, meaning, and communication. Kramer's DAD theory also utilizes concepts from several scholars, most notably Jean Gebser and Lewis Mumford, to synthesize explanations of widely observed cultural expressions and differences.

Kramer's theory identifies three communication styles (idolic, symbolic, or signalic) in order to explain cultural differences. In this theory, there is no single means of communication automatically better, and no last word on intercultural conflict presented. Kramer presents three connected theories instead: the theory Dimensional Accrual and Dissociation, the Cultural Fusion Theory and the Cultural Churning Theory.

For instance, according to Kramer's DAD theory, a statue of a god in an idolic community is god, and stealing it is a highly punishable offense. For example, many people in India believe that statues of the god Ganesh – to take such a statue/god from its temple is more than theft, it is blasphemy. Idolic reality involves strong emotional identification, where a holy relic does not simply symbolize the sacred, it is sacred. By contrast, a Christian crucifix follows a symbolic nature, where it represents a symbol of God. Lastly, the signalic modality is far less emotional and increasingly dissociated.

Kramer refers to changes in each culture due to acculturation as co-evolution. Kramer also addresses what he calls the qualities of out vectors which address the nature in which the former and new cultures make contact. Kramer uses the phrase "interaction potential" to refer to differences in individual or group acculturative processes. For instance, the process of acculturation varies significantly in the case of individuals who were immigrating to the host nation as refugees or immigrants. Furthermore, this process encompasses the importance of how hospitable the host society is to the newcomer, how welcoming the host is toward accommodating and acquainting the newcomer, and how their interaction affects the host and the newcomer.

=== Fourfold models ===
The four essential (paradigm) forms of acculturation

The fourfold model is a bilinear model that categorizes acculturation strategies along two dimensions. The first dimension concerns the retention or rejection of an individual's minority or native culture (i.e. "Is it considered to be of value to maintain one's identity and characteristics?"), whereas the second dimension concerns the adoption or rejection of the dominant group or host culture. ("Is it considered to be of value to maintain relationships with the larger society?") From this, four acculturation strategies emerge.

- Assimilation occurs when individuals adopt the cultural norms of a dominant or host culture, over their original culture. Sometimes it is forced by governments.
- Separation occurs when individuals reject the dominant or host culture in favor of preserving their culture of origin. Separation is often facilitated by immigration to ethnic enclaves.
- Integration occurs when individuals can adopt the cultural norms of the dominant or host culture while maintaining their culture of origin. Integration leads to, and is often synonymous with biculturalism.
- Marginalization occurs when individuals reject both their culture of origin and the dominant host culture.

Studies suggest that individuals' respective acculturation strategy can differ between their private and public life spheres. For instance, an individual may reject the values and norms of the dominant culture in their private life (separation), whereas they might adapt to the dominant culture in public parts of their life (i.e., integration or assimilation).

=== Predictors of acculturation strategies ===
The fourfold models used to describe individual attitudes of immigrants parallel models used to describe group expectations of the larger society and how groups should acculturate. In a melting pot society, in which a harmonious and homogenous culture is promoted, assimilation is the endorsed acculturation strategy. In segregationist societies, in which humans are separated into racial, ethnic and/or religious groups in daily life, a separation acculturation strategy is endorsed. In a multiculturalist society, in which multiple cultures are accepted and appreciated, individuals are encouraged to adopt an integrationist approach to acculturation. In societies where cultural exclusion is promoted, individuals often adopt marginalization strategies of acculturation.

Attitudes towards acculturation, and thus the range of acculturation strategies available, have not been consistent over time. For example, for most of American history, policies and attitudes have been based around established ethnic hierarchies with an expectation of one-way assimilation for predominantly White European immigrants. Although the notion of cultural pluralism has existed since the early 20th century, the recognition and promotion of multiculturalism did not become prominent in America until the 1980s. Separatism can still be seen today in autonomous religious communities such as the Amish and the Hutterites. Direct environment also affects the availability, advantage, and choice of various acculturation strategies. Since immigrants settle in unequal segments of society, immigrants to lower-ranked economic and ethnic hierarchies may face restricted social mobility and membership in a disadvantaged group. It is accounted for by the Segmented Assimilation theory, under which the case when immigrant groups or individuals assimilate into the society of the host nation to its various segments' culture. One's entry into the upper class, middle class, or lower class is also highly dependent on the socioeconomic status of the last generation.

On a broad scale study, involving immigrants in 13 immigration-receiving countries, the experience of discrimination was positively related to the maintenance of the immigrants' ethnic culture. That is, immigrant communities that retain their culture values and practices are more likely to be discriminated against compared to those that make sacrifices in their culture. Additional research has also shown that the acculturation process and strategy of immigrants can largely be determined by how accepting of acculturation preference among the host society members is. The degree of intergroup and interethnic contact has also been shown to influence acculturation preferences between groups, support for multilingual and multicultural maintenance of minority groups, and openness towards multiculturalism. Greater comprehension towards out-groups, empathy, building community, lessening prejudice and social distance, and changing good intentions and action assist in the creation of improved interethnic and intercultural relations through intergroup contact.

There is variation in preferred and ideal acculturation approaches among most people in different aspects of their lives. For instance, among immigrants, it is easier and preferable to acculturate towards the host nation's views of politics and government, as compared to acculturation of new beliefs in terms of religion, principles, values, and tradition.

== Acculturative stress ==
Population migration on a large scale all over the world has driven acculturation studies, and how it is impacting health through altering stress, health care utilization, and definitions of health. The effects of acculturation on physical health is thought to be a major factor in the immigrant paradox, which argues that first generation immigrants tend to have better health outcomes than non-immigrants. Even though this phrase has been popularized, most academic literature contends otherwise, or that the immigrants are in better health than the host culture counterparts.

One prominent explanation for the negative health behaviors and outcomes (e.g. substance use, low birth weight) associated with the acculturation process is the acculturative stress theory. Acculturative stress refers to the stress response of immigrants in response to their experiences of acculturation. Stressors may be but are not restricted to learning stresses of a second language, preserving the native tongue, reconciling oppositional cultural values, and brokering between host vs. native acceptable social behaviors. Acculturative stress can manifest in many ways, including but not limited to anxiety, depression, substance abuse, and other forms of mental and physical maladaptation. Stress caused by acculturation has been heavily documented in phenomenological research on the acculturation of a large variety of immigrants. This research has shown that acculturation is a "fatiguing experience requiring a constant stream of bodily energy," and is both an "individual and familial endeavor" involving " consisting of "enduring loneliness caused by seemingly insurmountable language barriers.".

One of the disparities with respect to risk for acculturative stress is degree of willingness, or migration status, and it can be greatly different if one immigrates into a country as a voluntary immigrant, refugee, asylum seeker, or sojourner. According to several studies, voluntary migrants experience roughly 50% less acculturative stress than refugees, making this an important distinction. According to Schwartz (2010), there are four main categories of migrants:

1. Voluntary immigrants: those that leave their country of origin to find employment, economic opportunity, advanced education, marriage, or to reunite with family members that have already immigrated.
2. Refugees: those who have been involuntarily displaced by persecution, war, or natural disasters.
3. Asylum seekers: those who willingly leave their native country to flee persecution or violence.
4. Sojourners: those who relocate to a new country on a time-limited basis and for a specific purpose. This group fully intends to return to their native country.

This form of entry differentiation is significant, yet acculturative stress also varies extensively within and between ethnic groups. A great deal of previous academic work has been undertaken with Asian and Latino/a immigrants, but more needs to be done regarding the influence of acculturative stress on other ethnic immigrant groups. Among U.S. Latinos, higher levels of adoption of the American host culture has been associated with negative effects on health behaviors and outcomes, such as increased risk for depression and discrimination, and increased risk for low self-esteem. Other studies have found greater levels of acculturation are associated with greater sleep problems. However, others also say "experiencing relief and protection in relationships" and "feeling worse and then feeling better about oneself with higher competencies" in the process of acculturation. Again, these variations are likely related to the age of the immigrant, the manner in which a migrant has departed from his or her home country, and the manner in which a migrant is accepted by source and destination cultures. Recent research has compared the acculturative processes of documented Mexican-American immigrants and undocumented Mexican-American immigrants and found significant differences in their experiences and levels of acculturative stress. Both groups of Mexican-American immigrants faced similar risks for depression and discrimination from the host (Americans), but the undocumented group of Mexican-American immigrants also faced discrimination, hostility, and exclusion by their own ethnic group (Mexicans) because of their unauthorized legal status. These studies highlight the complexities of acculturative stress, the degree of variability in health outcomes, and the need for specificity over generalizations when discussing potential or actual health outcomes.

Researchers have only recently discovered that there is an additional level of complexity in this field, in the form that survey data have grouped different ethnic groups together or have misidentified an ethnic group. In generalization, there can be the loss or blurring of subtlety and nuance in terms of the acculturation experience or acculturative stress of an individual or group. For example, much of the scholarly literature on this topic uses U.S. census data. The Census incorrectly labels Arab-Americans as Caucasian or "White". By doing so, this data set omits many factors about the Muslim Arab-American migrant experience, including but not limited to acculturation and acculturative stress. This is of particular importance after the events of September 11, 2001, since Muslim Arab-Americans have faced increased prejudice and discrimination, leaving this religious ethnic community with an increased risk of acculturative stress. Research focusing on the adolescent Muslim Arab American experience of acculturation has also found that youth who experience acculturative stress during the identity formation process are at a higher risk for low self-esteem, anxiety, and depression.

Some researchers argue that education, social support, hopefulness about employment opportunities, financial resources, family cohesion, maintenance of traditional cultural values, and high socioeconomic status (SES) serve as protections or mediators against acculturative stress. Previous work shows that limited education, low SES, and underemployment all increase acculturative stress. Since this field of research is rapidly growing, more research is needed to better understand how certain subgroups are differentially impacted, how stereotypes and biases have influenced former research questions about acculturative stress, and the ways in which acculturative stress can be effectively mediated.

== Other outcomes ==
=== Culture ===
When individuals of a specific culture find themselves in contact with another culture (host) which is mainly more set up in the region where they live, elements of the host culture will most likely be appropriated and blended with elements of the people's native culture. In cases of extended contact, cultures have shared and mixed food, music, dances, attire, implements, and technologies. This type of cultural exchange is attributed to selective acculturation, which is the act of preserving cultural content by learning about the way those individuals use language, religious belief, and family norms. Cultural exchange can either occur naturally through extended contact, or more quickly though cultural appropriation or cultural imperialism.

Cultural appropriation is the process of adopting specific elements of one culture by members a different cultural group. It can include the introduction of forms of dress or personal adornment, music and art, religion, language, or behavior. These elements are typically imported into the existing culture, and may have wildly different meanings or lack the subtleties of their original cultural context. Because of this, cultural appropriation for financial gain is oftentimes condemned, and has sometimes been termed "cultural theft".

Cultural imperialism is the practice of promoting the culture or language of one nation in another, usually occurring in situations in which assimilation is the dominant strategy of acculturation. Cultural imperialism can take the form of an active, formal policy or a general attitude regarding cultural superiority.

=== Language ===
In some instances, acculturation results in the adoption of another country's language, which is then modified over time to become a new, distinct, language. For example, Hanzi, the written language of Chinese language, has been adapted and modified by other nearby cultures, including: Japan (as kanji), Korea (as hanja), and Vietnam (as chữ Hán). Jews, often living as ethnic minorities, developed distinct languages derived from the common languages of the countries in which they lived (for example, Yiddish from High German and Ladino from Old Spanish). Another common effect of acculturation on language is the formation of pidgin languages. Pidgin is a mixed language that has developed to help communication between members of different cultures in contact, usually occurring in situations of trade or colonialism. For example, Pidgin English is a simplified form of English mixed with some of the language of another culture. Some pidgin languages can develop into creole languages, which are spoken as a first language.

Language plays a pivotal role in cultural heritage, serving as both a foundation for group identity and a means for transmitting culture in situations of contact between languages. Language acculturation strategies, attitudes and identities can also influence the sociolinguistic development of languages in bi/multilingual contexts.

=== Food ===
Acculturation impacts eating habits and intake at various levels. Studies have confirmed that dietary habits are precarious and consumed in secret, and change is a slow process. Learning to eat new food relies on the accessibility of indigenous ingredients, preparation simplicity, and price; thus, an immediate adjustment is expected to take place. Food acculturation aspects include food preparation, presentation, and consumption. Various societies prepare, present, and consume food differently. If one is exposed to another society for a long time, one is likely to learn aspects of the "host" society's food culture and apply them to oneself. In situations like these, acculturation is greatly dependent on general food information, or the information regarding the particular foods various cultures generally consume, the media, and social interaction. It makes various cultures interact with each other, and as a result, some of their elements blend and also become more acceptable to the people of each of the involved cultures.

== Controversies and debate ==
=== Definitions ===
Anthropologists have made a semantic distinction between group and individual levels of acculturation. In such instances, the term transculturation is used to define individual foreign-origin acculturation, and occurs on a smaller scale with less visible impact. Scholars making this distinction use the term "acculturation" only to address large-scale cultural transactions. Acculturation, then, is the process by which migrants gain new information and insight about the norms and values of their culture and adapt their behaviors to the host culture.

=== Recommended models ===
Research has largely indicated that the integrationist model of acculturation leads to the most favorable psychological outcomes and marginalization to the least favorable. While an initial meta-analysis of the acculturation literature found these results to be unclear, a more thorough meta-analysis of 40 studies showed that integration was indeed found to have a "significant, weak, and positive relationship with psychological and sociocultural adjustment". A study was done by John W. Berry (2006) that included 7,997 immigrant adolescents from 13 countries found that immigrant boys tend to have slightly better psychological adaptation than immigrant girls. Overall, immigrants in the integration profile were found to be more well-adapted than those in other profiles. Perceived discrimination was also negatively linked to both psychological and sociocultural adaptation. Various factors can explain the differences in these findings, including how different the two interacting cultures are, and degree of integration difficulty (bicultural identity integration). These types of factors partially explain why general statements about approaches to acculturation are not sufficient in predicting successful adaptation. As research in this area has expanded, one study has identified marginalization as being a maladaptive acculturation strategy.

=== Typological approach ===
Several theorists have stated that the fourfold models of acculturation are too simplistic to have predictive validity. Some common criticisms of such models include the fact that individuals don't often fall neatly into any of the four categories, and that there is very little evidence for the applied existence of the marginalization acculturation strategy. In addition, the bi-directionality of acculturation means that whenever two groups are engaged in cultural exchange, there are 16 permutations of acculturation strategies possible (e.g. an integrationist individual within an assimilationist host culture). According to the research, another critique of the fourfold model of acculturation is that the people are less likely to cultivate a self-perception but either not assimilate other cultures or continuing the heritage cultures. Rethinking the Concept of Acculturation - PMC The interactive acculturation model represents one proposed alternative to the typological approach by attempting to explain the acculturation process within a framework of state policies and the dynamic interplay of host community and immigrant acculturation orientations.

== See also ==
- Naturalization
- Acclimatization
- Socialization
- Deculturalization
- Globalization
- Nationalization
- Acculturation gap
- Educational anthropology
- Ethnocentrism
- Cultural relativism
- Cultural conflict
- Inculturation
- Cultural competence
- Language shift
- Westernization
- Cultural identity
- Linguistic imperialism
- Intercultural communication
- Fusion music
- Fusion cuisine

Culture-specific:

- Anglicisation
- Arabization
- Stolen Generations (of Australian Aborigines)
- Christianization
- Croatisation
- Francization
- Germanization
- Hellenization
- Hispanicization
- "More Irish than the Irish themselves"
- Indianisation
- Islamification
- Italianization
- Japanization
- Javanisation
- Jewish assimilation
- Lithuanization
- Magyarization
- Malayisation
- Norwegianization
- Pashtunization
- Persianization
- Polonization
- Russification
- Romanianization
- Romanization
- Sanskritisation
- Serbianisation
- Sinicization
- Slavicisation
- Slovakization
- Swedification
- Ukrainization
- Thaification
- Turkification
- Vietnamization (cultural)
- Gerim
