= Wienerlied =

Viennese song genre

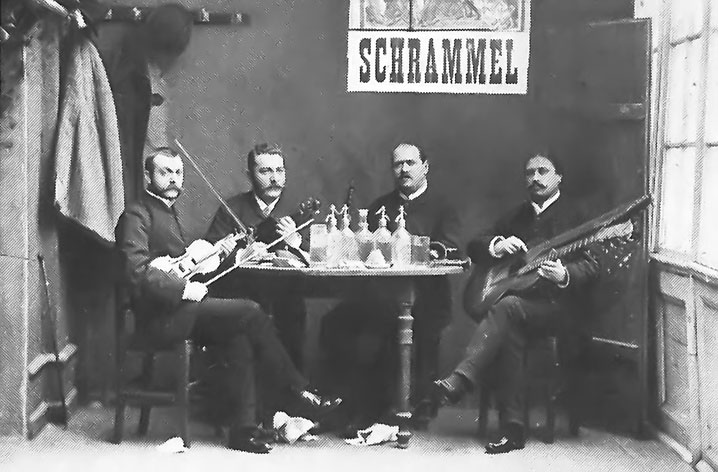
The Schrammel quartet in 1890

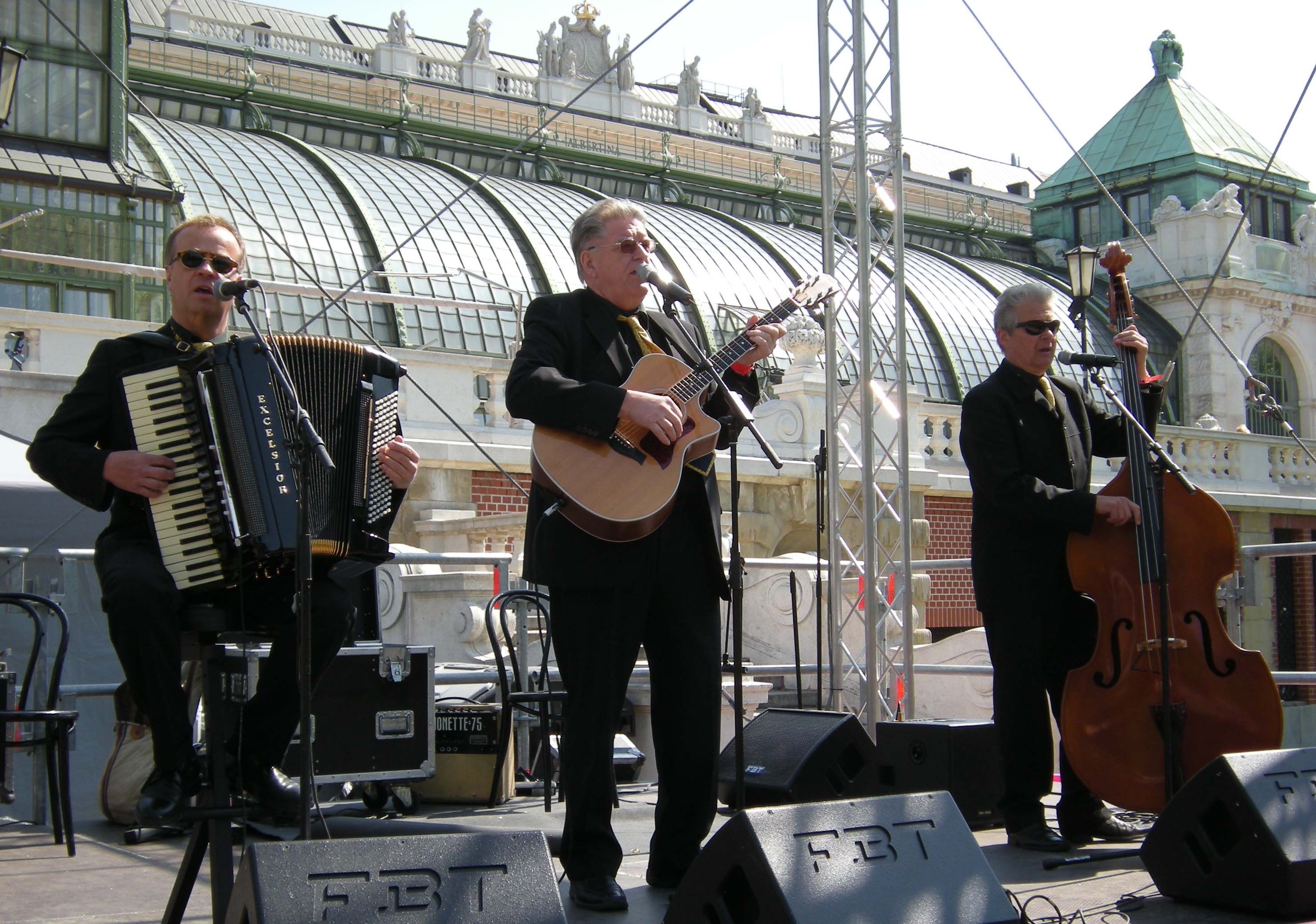
Trio Wien, Stadt.Fest.Wien 2009

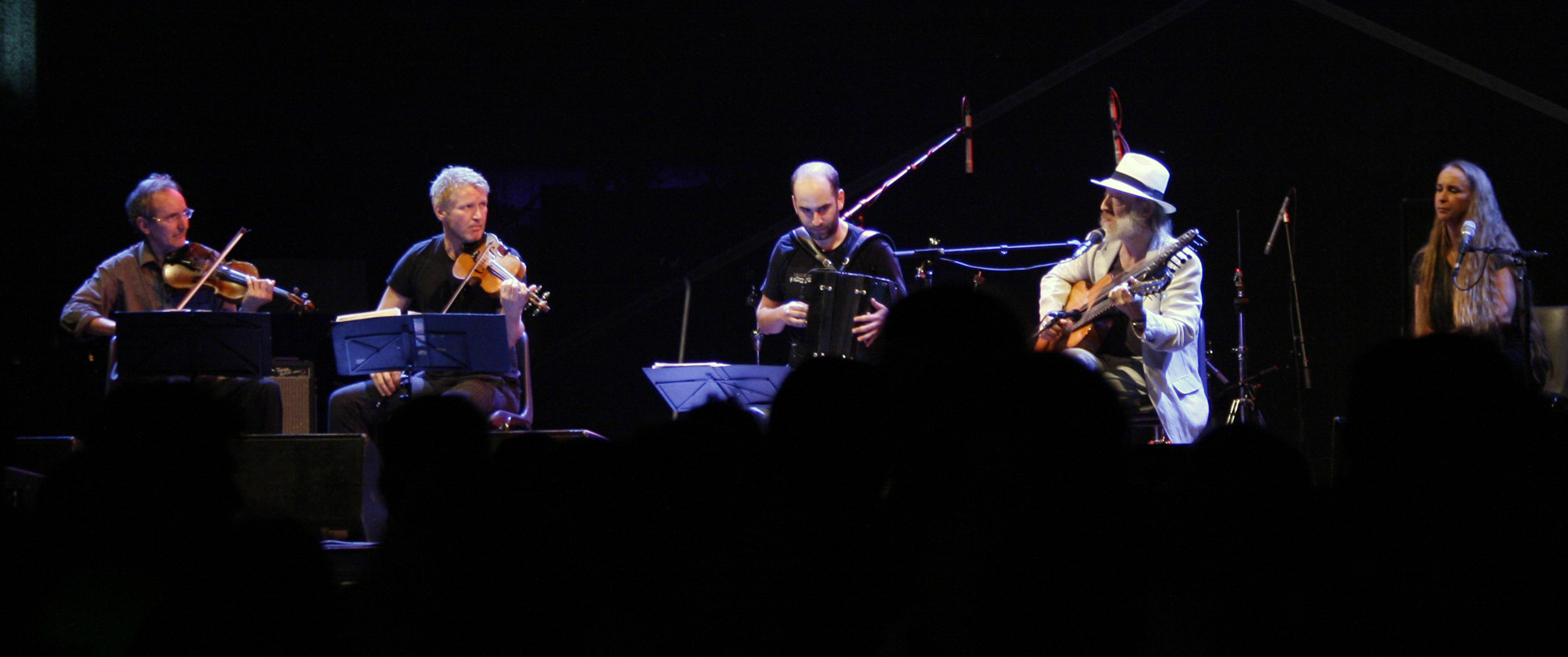
The Extremschrammeln, Donauinselfest 2008

The Wienerlied (German, literally: Viennese song, pl. Wienerlieder) or Weanaliad (viennese, pl. Weanaliada) is a traditional song genre which has its roots in Austria's capital and largest city, Vienna. Wienerlieder often center on life in Vienna. They are almost exclusively sung in Viennese German, a local Austro-Bavarian dialect. The Wienerlied is a unique musical and socio-cultural phenomenon, a psychograph of the Viennese way of life; a mix between idealism, joie de vivre and desperation.

There are approximately 60,000 – 70,000 Wienerlieder, of which only a few hundred are still sung today.

== Characteristics ==
A distinguishing feature of many Wienerlieder is their chromatic and harmonic variety. Frequent changes in tempo together with theatrical pauses throughout the songs bring a certain degree of excitement to both singer and listener. A typical Wienerlied is written according to a 2/4 or 3/4 time signature with an often-alternated rhythm.

The Wienerlied has a more complicated musical structure than other well-known music genres such as blues, rock, folk or Alpine folk music. It is therefore quite unusual that Wienerlieder became so popular, yet it is often the case that many songs become established as traditional folk songs in Vienna.

The Alpine-Bavarian roots of Wienerlieder are still recognizable; for example, the melody of ‘Ländler’ (an Austrian folk dance featuring much hopping and stamping) or the characteristic use of melodic polyphony (a deep main voice sung together with a second accompanying higher-pitched voice). Slavo-Hungarian components are also recognizable within Wienerlieder, adding to the unique mix of multiple musical elements that give an exciting and surprising feel to Viennese folk songs. And all of this with a carefree wink and that typical Viennese ‘schmäh’ (Viennese: “Weana Schmäh”; German: “Wiener Schmäh”) as characteristic as the folk songs themselves; a blend of humour built on quick-wit and charm and at times sarcasm and melancholy, but always expressed with a smile.

=== Roots ===
The characteristics of Wienerlieder can be defined through a variety of roots:

- Street-song, hurdy-gurdy man
- Theatre couplets
- Art song, lied
- Songs of “Volksaenger” (popular entertainers of Viennese folk culture)
- Folk songs (Bavarian, Slavic, Hungarian)
- Operetta and Vaudeville

== History ==
The Wienerlied reached its heyday in the 19th century, which is closely related to the rise of popular entertainment during the last quarter of the 19th century (inns and restaurants in the Prater gardens, nightclubs, Singspiel halls, "Heuriger" wine taverns, etc.). The development of Volkssaenger (popular entertainers of viennese folk culture) promoted the Wienerlied and several songs gained great popularity.

== Sources ==
- Most of the material in this article is from the Bavarian Wikipedia article Weanaliad.
