= Acculturation gap =

Concept in sociology relating to the intergenerational effects of immigration

The acculturation gap refers to the differences in the changing sets of values and culture between generations in a family, such as a child and a parent. Acculturation is the process through which a person adapts into a new culture, such as by learning its language or adopting its values and traditions.

The gap is often revealed after a family immigrates from one country to another and assimilates into a culture: after immigration, a child usually adapts into a new culture more quickly, often interacting with more people from the new culture than the culture of their parents (by attending school, for instance). Adults, on the other hand, generally take much longer to become acculturated, if they ever fully embrace or feel comfortable in the new culture at all.

The "acculturation gap-distress hypothesis" states that because the parent and child acculturate at different rates, the resulting differences in expectations and beliefs is linked to conflict within immigrant families and adolescent adjustment. However the results of studies which have tested this hypothesis have been inconclusive, and have often revealed more complex, nuanced factors at play.

== Conflict ==
The acculturation gap in language can cause conflict between members of an immigrant family. The parents use their native language more so than the primary language of their new environment. The child, depending on the age of the child during immigration, is more likely to assume the local primary language as their own.

If a child does not formally learn the language of their parents, conflict arises between the family because it becomes difficult for the parent and child to discuss topics in depth with one another. When parents have to rely on their child for translation, it reverses the child-parent relationship and can lead to complications.

== Acculturation gap-distress hypothesis ==
The acculturation gap causes distress among parents and their children. When parents acculturate at a slower rate than their children, it can result in the parent growing apart from the child and not feeling as connected as before. In addition, parents could prevent the child from participating in activities that are a part of the new culture, which could lead the child to want to acculturate even further. Studies found that the increased conflict leads to more tense families that do not bond as deeply as others. In addition, it is likely that these children act out behaviorally or academically.

One study with Mexican-American families found that intergenerational acculturation was unrelated to youth behavioral issues and family conflict disproving the acculturation gap-distress hypothesis. The study found that when the parent was more acculturated than the child, the child struggled with aggression and antisocial behavior. This study also found that when neither the parent or child was acculturated to the American or traditional culture, the child had a greater risk of conduct problems.

== Cultural dissonance ==
Immigrants sometimes face cultural dissonance when moving from one place to another. They may be confronted with prejudice from locals who feel their home has been infiltrated. This results in the immigrant feeling uncomfortable in the new environment which can potentially lead to conflict.

Studies have found that an immigrant child's exposure to discrimination and negative stereotypes while acculturating also can generate family conflict back at home due to the child's lost traditional cultural values.

== East Asian-American study findings ==
Multiple studies were conducted to evaluate the acculturation gap and whether or not it has detrimental effects. The studies ask children and parents about how they feel about their own acculturation and the acculturation of other family members. The studies then compare the gaps. Results from some studies showed that parents were more attached to their cultural heritage while other studies showed that the children were more attached than their parents. Based on this, the acculturation gap may not be as predicted.

Studies also reflect that many struggle with adjusting culturally. Studies exhibit links between cultural dissonance and depression in the case of Chinese-American children. Chinese-Canadian and Chinese-American children who do not know the Chinese language as well as they'd like show a link to depression. Higher conflict than normal is shown in Indian-American, Soviet-American, and Vietnamese-American families where the acculturation gap exists.

Researchers found that the acculturation gap between East Asian-American generations is negatively correlated with parent-youth relationships. This disconnection leads to different mental health problems among the youth.

== Mexican-American study findings ==
Studies were conducted in the American Southwest, where there are many children with Mexican ancestry, to see how these children's home and parental values clash with the values of their peers at school. Studies have shown that higher levels of acculturation correlate with delinquency—the existence of a gap can increase the likelihood of children participating in deviant behaviors.

Studies with Mexican-American youth and parents also reflect similar data that remains inconclusive. The study notes that in the American Southwest, Mexican culture is prevalent and the close proximity to Mexico may play a role in the results.

Minimal research has been done to see the impact of the acculturation gap on parents compared to adolescents. However, one study has found that there is a link between Hispanic adults that have low acculturation rates and an increased risk of poor low-density lipoprotein cholesterol control.

== Confounding variables in studies ==
Confounding variables (such as income and stability) exist in evaluations that connect the acculturation gap and family conflict. Therefore, the acculturation gap hypothesis needs further testing.

Furthermore, migration and work add to family stresses. Immigrants parents in the United States typically have longer work days and are away from their children more. These details must be addressed in future studies.

== Future acculturation gap research ==
Understanding the acculturation gap is important because minority population in the US continues to grow. Further research regarding the connection of acculturation gaps to family conflict could produce methods of to prevent conflict and treat those affected.
