= Rossen Petkov =

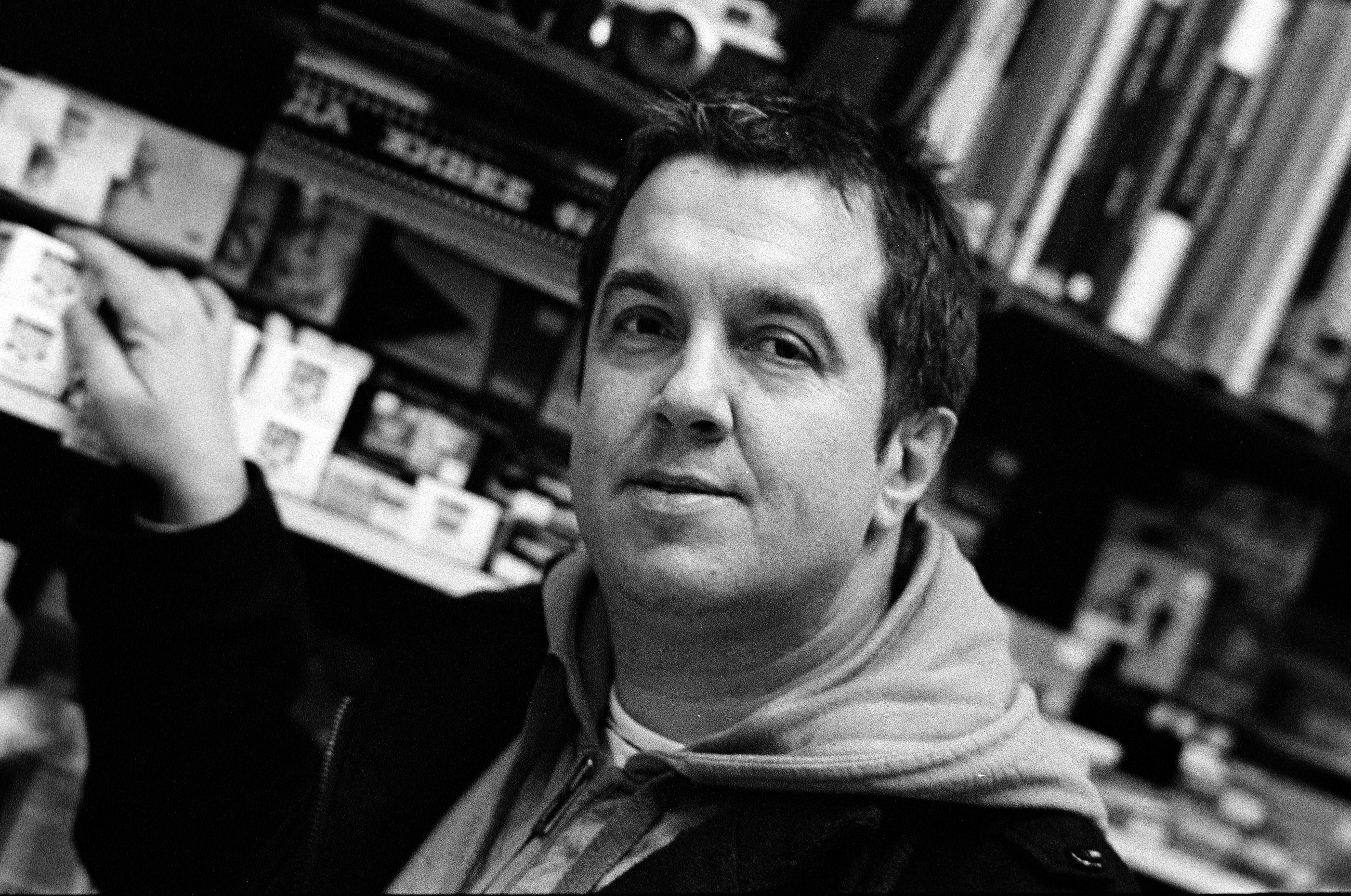
- Born: 24 January 1967 (age 58); Haskovo, Bulgaria
- Occupation(s): chair, Student Computer Art Society

Rossen Kirchev Petkov is a Bulgarian writer and teacher, one of the country's pioneers in the field of digital arts, computer graphics and multimedia. He is the author of dozens of articles about modern media in education and learning, founded a network of students information and career centers in Bulgaria and is chair of the organizational committee of Computer Space forum - an international forum for computer art.

== Biography ==
Rossen Petkov is born in Haskovo. In 1985 he graduated the Todor Velev Math High School, and in 1990 - the Technical University, Sofia.

In 1987, while still a student, he started working on projects, developing algorithms and programs for electronic music and computer graphics. In 1991 – 1992 he is editor and writer of the Graphics with computer magazine, where he has his own column, Computer Arts. In the beginning of the 1990s Petkov founded one of the first computer arts organizations in Bulgaria, the Student Computer Art Society (SCAS), with members among students, artists and experts in the field of modern media and digital arts.

Rossen Petkov is teaching Methods, algorithms and applications in computer graphics at the Technical University - Sofia, New Bulgarian University and others.

At the end of the 1990s Petkov founded students and youth information centers, using the Internet and data bases for search of information that would benefit young people – educational, job, travel, funding for start-up projects, etc. Under his guidance, SCAS joined effort with the governmental Committee for Youth and Sports to found a representative office of the international youth information network Eurodesk.

== Bibliography ==
- Petkov R. Musical Creativity and Microcomputers, "Young Constructor" Magazine, ISSN 0204-8469, Sofia, vol. 1, 1988, p. 2-3
- Boyanov Y., R. Petkov, Program "Composer1", "Young constructor" magazine, ISSN 0204-8469, Sofia, vol. 4, 1988, pp. I-IV
- Boyanov Y., S. Lazarov, R. Petkov, Method and Program for Various Variations, "Computer for You", ISSN 0205-1893, Sofia, vol. 1., 1989,
- Petkov R., Program for Three-dimensional Graphics, Computer Graphics Magazine, ISSN 0861-4636, Sofia, issue no. 1, 1992, pp. 14–15
- Petkov R., MIDI standard for communication between digital musical institutions, Computer Graphics Magazine, ISSN 0861-4636, Sofia, issue 2, 1992, pp. 14–16
- Petkov R., Graphic design, PC & Mac World magazine, ISSN 0737-8939, Sofia, issue no. 7, 1994, pp. 92–94
- Petkov, R., Multimedia development and computer arts in Bulgaria, Balkanmedia magazine, V3, Balkanmedia, ISSN 0861-5047, C: 1996, p. 25-26
- Petkov, R. Trends and Problems in the Development of Multimedia Technologies in Bulgaria, Bulgarian Media-learning (collected papers), Balkanmedia, C: 1996, ISSN 1310-7712.- 1 (1996), pp. 354–360
- Petkov R., D. Davitt, D. Donedd, Career Development Manual for Consultants, SCAS, C: 2004, ISBN 954-91507-4-7
- Petkov R. ed., Computer Space festival catalog (CD), SCAS, C: 2004, ISBN 954-91507-1-2
- Petkov R. ed., EuroNET- Youth Resources in Internet Catalog (CD), 5th edition, SCAS, C: 2005, MC 11645
- Petkov R., Tsv. Ilieva, others, E-Games: successful implementation of e-games in youth work manual, SCAS, C: 2007, ISBN 978-954-91507-6-6
- Petkov R., Tsv. Ilieva, others, Quality Assurance in Youth Career Consultancy Manual, SCAS, C: 2008, ISBN 978-954-91507-6-6
- Petkov R., W. Hilzensauer, others, ePortfolio for your future manual, SCAS, C: 2009, ISBN 978-954-92311-3-7
- Petkov R., About Old Books and Computer Arts, Monograph, SCAS, C: 2010,2012 (Second revised Edition), ISBN 978-954-92311-6-8
- Petkov R., E. Licheva, others, "Validation of self-acquired learning and credit transfer in web design and computer animation" manual, Rosen Petkov, SCAS: 2013, ISBN 978-954-92311-7-5
- Elitsa Licheva, Rosen Petkov, "E-Portfolio for the Evaluation of Informal Learning in Web Design and Computer Animation", Proceedings of ePIC 2013, 11th International ePortfolio and Identity Conference, London, 8-9-10 July 2013, ISBN 978- 2-9540144-3-2, p. 179-180
- Petkov R., E. Licheva et al., Guide "Design of Binding and Conservation of Old Books, Albums and Documents", ISBN 978-954-8854-18-4, S: Central Library of Bulgarian Academy of Sciences, 2014
- Petkov R., E. Licheva, D. Atanasova, Electronic Learning and Computer Design (CAD) of Binding, Vocational Education Magazine, vol. 16 pcs. 6, 2014, pp. 573–588
- Petkov, R., D. Krastev, E. Licheva and others, Binding Design and Paper Conservation of Antique Books, Albums and Documents, Manual, SCAS 2014, ISBN 978-954-92311-8-2
- Petkov R., E. Licheva and others, Mobile Games in Youth Work Manual, NSICC, 2015, ISBN 978-619-90547-0-3
- Petkov R., E. Licheva and Others, Self-Guidance and Modern Media Literacy Manual, 2016, ISBN 978-954-92311-9-9
