= European Youth Portal =

The European Youth Portal is a multi-lingual website addressing young people in Europe and providing access to youth related European and national information. The aim of the European Youth Portal is to provide young people aged 13 to 30 across Europe with information and opportunities around a wide range of topics based on the EU Youth Strategy, including education, employment, participation, culture, social inclusion, health, mobility and volunteering. One of its major strengths is that this content is provided at European and national levels through a partnership between the European Commission and Eurodesk, and is available in up to 27 different languages, covering 33 countries.

== Background ==
The European Youth Portal is an initiative of the European Commission and was launched in 2014. The portal was suggested in the European Commission's White Paper "A new impetus for European Youth". It has been developed with and for young people, particularly in association with Eurodesk and the European Youth Forum. In April 2009, the European Commission adopted the EU Youth Strategy. One of the strategy's objectives is to enhance the participation of all young people in society and to increase their participation in civic life and in representative democracy. It is also stated in the Council Resolution of 27 November 2009 on a renewed framework for European cooperation in the youth field (2010–2018)." To this end, the European Commission re-launched the European Youth Portal in May 2013 with a new look and feel, and new content. It replaced the previous one which was no longer meeting the growing expectations of its young audience.

== Management ==
The Eurodesk network - a permanent support structure of the European Union's 'Youth in Action' programme - is responsible for managing the content, contributing to its translation and promoting the portal.
