= Lucas Welch =

American social entrepreneur

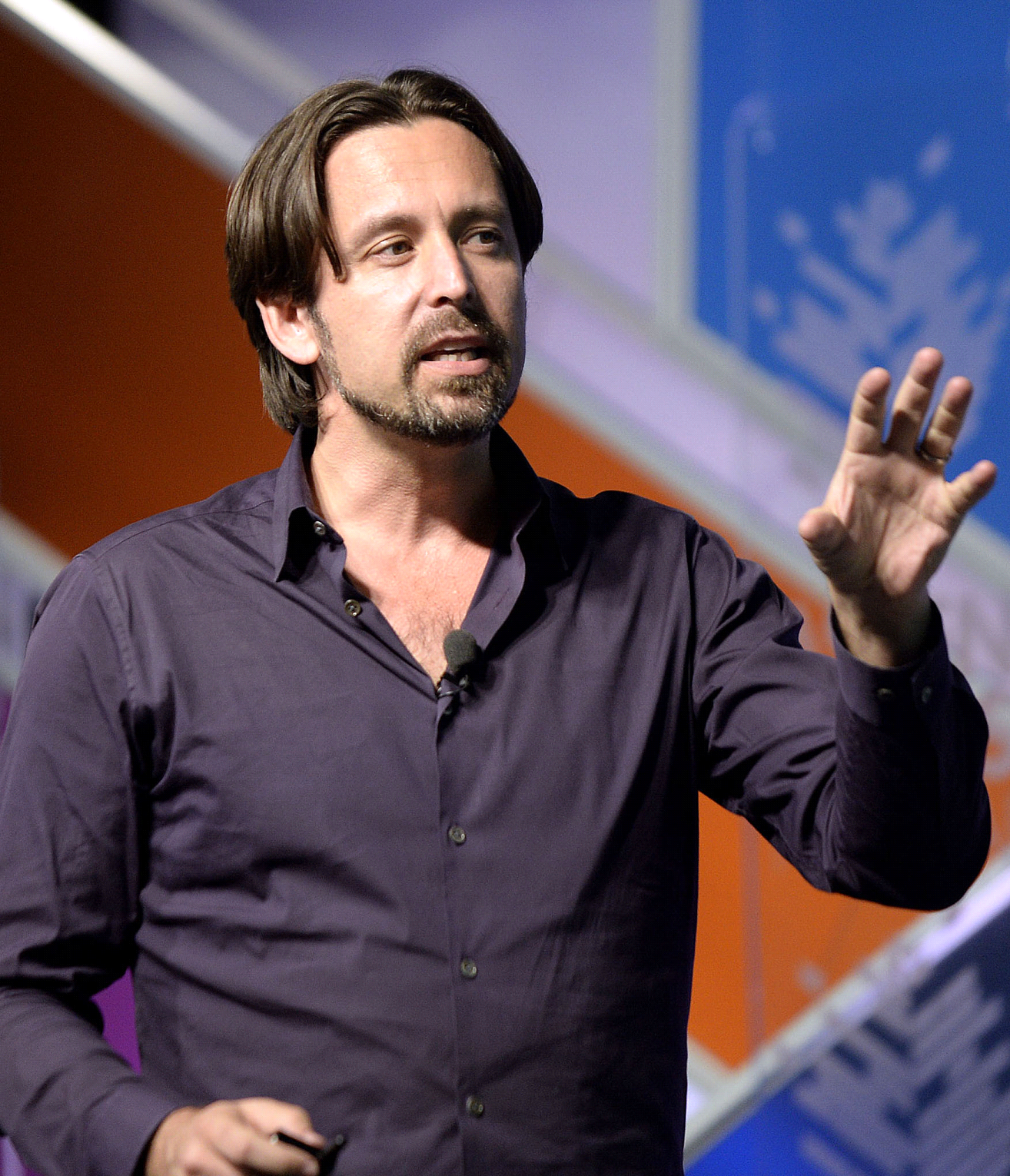
- Born: 1974 (age 51–52); Chapel Hill, North Carolina
- Education: Brown University
- Years active: 1998 - current
- Known for: Soliya
- Spouse: Julia Bacha
- Children: 2
- Website: http://soliya.net/

Lucas Welch (born 1974 in North Carolina) is a New York-based social entrepreneur. Welch founded Soliya, an international nonprofit organization that works on virtual exchange programs among university students in Western and Muslim-majority countries. He is known for his role in the establishment of the J. Christopher Stevens Virtual Exchange Initiative, to connect one million young people in the United States and the Middle East. Welch currently serves as the executive director of the Pluribus Project, an initiative with the Aspen Institute, to build the political power of the many in the United States.

== Early life and education ==
Born in Chapel Hill, North Carolina, in 1974, Welch completed middle and high school in Potomac, Maryland, where his family relocated in 1986. He earned his Bachelor of Arts degree from Brown University in 1996, then pursued graduate studies at the University of Michigan's Center for the Study of Complex Systems.

== Career ==
Welch began working in documentary filmmaking in 1998 as an editor and worked on projects for ABC News and others, including The Evolution of Revolution: Live from Tehran and The Search for Jesus for ABC News with Peter Jennings. In 2000, he moved to Jerusalem, where he taught new media at Birzeit University, and also contributed to ABC News coverage of the Second Intifada. He relocated to New York in the summer of 2001, where he started working as a producer on programming designed to bridge ABC News bridge television and online content for Jennings. After the terrorist attacks of 9/11, Welch left ABC with the goal of starting an organization that would leverage the potential of new media and communication technologies to help foster better understanding between the Western and Muslim worlds.

He founded Soliya with Liza Chambers in 2002 and worked on creating an online cross-cultural education program. The Connect Program demonstrated that new media platforms for virtual exchange could provide the kind of deep, interactive, and sustained social learning opportunities that have typically been available to young people only through travel and study-abroad programs. The program was accepted in over 100 universities in 28 countries across the Middle East, North Africa, South Asia, Europe and North America.

In 2011, Soliya joined the Global Nomads Group and iEARN-USA to form the Virtual Exchange Coalition (then called the Exchange 2.0 Coalition), for virtual exchange to ensure a cross-cultural experience as part of their education. Welch wrote an article for Huffington Post about his friend J. Christopher Stevens, a U.S. Ambassador who was killed in Benghazi, Libya, in September 2012. He wrote about Stevens’ humility and commitment to respectful dialogue and the potential of virtual exchange programs to build off of and extend that legacy. That article caught the attention of the family of Ambassador Stevens and they began working with the Virtual Exchange Coalition to scale up Virtual Exchange programs between youth in the US and the Middle East. That effort ultimately led to the establishment of the J. Christopher Stevens Virtual Exchange Initiative. That initiative is now managed by the Aspen Institute with support from public and private partners and was publicly announced by President Obama in 2015. It aims to connect 1 million young people from the US and the Middle East and North Africa by 2020 through virtual exchange programs.

Lucas Welch became the first executive director of the Pluribus Project in 2014. The Pluribus Project is a special initiative with the Aspen Institute. As its name suggests, Pluribus focuses on cultivating the political power of the many in the United States.

== Recognition ==
In 2004, Welch was included in the year's best new social entrepreneurs by the Echoing Green Foundation. He was designated as UN Alliance of Civilizations, Global Expert and a TED Fellow. In 2009, the Connect program received an Intercultural Innovation Award from the United Nations Alliance for Civilizations.

== Personal ==
Welch is married to documentary filmmaker Julia Bacha. They have a daughter and a son and live in New York City.
