= Interactive acculturation =

Model in sociology

The interactive acculturation model (IAM) seeks to integrate within a common theoretical framework the following components of immigrants and host community relations in multicultural settings:

1. acculturation orientations adopted by immigrant groups in the host community;
2. acculturation orientations adopted by the host community towards special groups of immigrants;
3. interpersonal and intergroup relational outcomes that are the product of combinations of immigrant and host community acculturation orientations.

The framework of these established among a structural political/governmental environment. Ultimately, the goal of the model is to present a non-determinist, more dynamic account of immigrant and host community acculturation in multicultural settings.

Essentially the model takes both sides of immigration (host and immigrant) and compares the values and desire to hold on to historical and cultural ties of the immigrant population versus the desire or degree to which the host population is willing to accommodate the immigrant influx. Examples of questions posed to the host population include:

1. Do you find it acceptable that immigrants maintain their cultural heritage?
2. Do you accept that immigrants adopt the culture of your host community?

The model derives two important pieces of data:

1. the level to which the immigrant population is willing maintain its historical and cultural roots against;
2. its desire (or lack thereof) to integrate and adopt the history and cultural traits of the host society.

The model essentially categorizes the population, based on the responses, as being in favor of integration, assimilation, or separation. When cross compared with the level of accommodation the host society is willing to provide, the model predicts whether the immigrant population will become fully assimilated, marginalized, or even isolated from the host society.

== State attitudes to immigration and acculturation ==
In the past, acculturation has been described in both a macro level where there is emphasis on processes and effects on populations and at a micro level where it describes the psychological effect on individuals. Bourhis et al. reference the earlier work of both Graves and Berry in the identification of individual psychological change that the immigrant experiences during their integration into a host culture. These changes are observed in the individual who is influenced by the new culture as well as participating and interacting within the new culture. To further understand the social and psychological effects of immigrant acculturation, the Bourhis team starts their model with an analysis of structural policies that address immigration, particularly in host nations.

=== State policies ===
The Bourhis et al. article delineates first the ideologies that make up the basis of the policies that are present in the host state. The study very much accepts the notion that these policies are very influential in the dynamics and the eventual acculturation process that goes on by the host and immigrant people. The Bourhis team categorized the host nation policies in the manner of Breton into state immigration policies that spell out quantities, type and origin of allowed immigrants, conditions and rules and then go on further to define the living rules that immigrants must live by in the host country such as work permits, ability to naturalize, etc. In addition we also have identified state integration policies that addressed mechanisms to help immigrants with joining into the host culture as well as measures to aid in host country acceptance of immigrants. These two types of policies may be symbiotic or at odds with each other in terms of goals and focus. The Bourhis team was primarily concerned with Western countries and noticed that in these nations, the policies, research, implementation and responsibility for both immigration and integration often resided in one sole governmental agency. This agency was often chartered with duties of writing statues, enforcing immigration laws and very possibly may be the governmental focus for assimilation and integration policy. Based on international conventions and referencing previous work by Kaplan, sovereign countries possess the right and responsibility to define the limits and scope of nationality. Each country is presumed to have the right to decide who is a national and what does it take to be a national of that nation. Nations will derive their immigration policies based on a multitude of factors but in the context of state and national attitudes toward the immigrant populations. These policies define not only numbers and bureaucratic processes but also address the illegal immigration and the methods of countering it. As with all state policy, the laws enacted reflect both the majority host nation attitudes as well as help form these attitudes. The Bourhis model is premised on the adaptation of four groupings for state policies. The state integration policies are not exclusive and permanent to a particular host country. The ideologies exist as a combination of the state policies and the surrounding public support that it is deemed were the basis of these policies. The state policies are usually not codified into constitutional form and are modified over time to reflect the changing circumstances and attitudes of both the people and the government. The following are described by Bourhis in the explanation of the IAM:

=== Pluralist ideologies ===
A construct based on the idea that the host nation expects immigrant populations to adhere and adopt host nation public values such as democracy and individual freedom but are free to maintain individual and native cultural values as long as they are within the wide confines and boundaries of host laws (native language use is OK but polygamy would not be acceptable). The policies adopted by the state would reflect a positive view of immigrants maintaining their diverse cultures and would support these differences not only socially but possibly financially. It is this last detail of financial support or government enactment of positive policy that differentiates this from a more civic ideology and state policy. Some Scandinavian countries as well as other western democracies have at times leaned this way to encourage cultural diversity and set acculturation as a state goal.

=== Civic ideologies ===
These policies would also maintain the premise that immigrants adopt host nation public values and that individual values are not to be dictated or regulated by the host government. But in civic ideologies, there is no public financial support for these private values or for the continuation and flourishing of the particular culture. The cultural identities and values are allowed but not promoted by the host nation in a government policy of non-intervention. Many European countries and various Latin American countries espouse a civic ideology to some extent. These countries often witness flourishing immigrant populations that maintain a cultural identity and sometimes language.

=== Assimilation ideology ===
These are the set of beliefs and policies that support both the adoption of public values by the immigrant population but also of some private values of host nation dominant culture. We would expect these policies to dictate such aspects like a single language in the schools and encourage voluntary (sometimes mandatory) cultural integration at all levels to homogenize the expressions of the immigrant population with that of the host nation. This could not only be voluntary but encouraged or mandated and expected to happen over time. The US had essentially assimilation policies until the great influx of immigrants during the last half of the past century at which time the country has softened its attitudes and policies toward a more civic ideology. A variant to the assimilation ideology is the Republican ideology similar to that expressed in France as far back as the revolution that supposes a "universal man" that is able to suppress less desired, backward, cultural traits and require a "leveling out" in order to fully participate as an equal in the society.

=== Ethnist ideology ===
This is basically the idea that the state can mandate the whole of public and private values and make them a precondition to full citizenship. It occasionally is manifested in the mandatory taking of host country values as necessary by the immigrant populations or more often this ideology is expressed in a requirement to be part of an ethnicity, religion or race to be accepted as a citizen. Governments may enact blood relations requirement or parentage to conditions for citizenship. Witness countries like Switzerland, Israel and Japan where immigrants are not accepted as they lack the ethnic blood to become full members of the citizenry and can only be allowed a lesser status such as guest worker or second class citizen.

== Immigrant population attitudes ==
The attitudes of immigrant populations that shape their acculturation and level of assimilation into the host society vary widely. One attitude in particular that has been explored is the concept of biculturalism. Under Gordon's (1964) proposal, he identifies a unidimensional model of acculturation that immigrant groups undergo over time as they strive to maintain equilibrium between their own culture/heritage against those of their adoptive host state. This equilibrium is essentially biculturalism, where the immigrant population retains features of their heritage culture while adopting key elements of the host’s culture. Biculturalism is transitory however, and over time, the immigrant population eventually assimilates into the culture of the host nation and becomes a "rightful member" of the majority, to fit into the existing social structure of the host society.

=== Criticism ===
Critics of the unidimensional model cite the influx of technologically and culturally advanced European powers into less developed societies into the new world that in essence assimilated the host society. The unidimensional model fails to account for the fact that the host majority is also changed by the presence of culturally distinctive immigrants.

=== Bidimensional model of acculturation ===
Efforts to explain further acculturation and assimilation among immigrant populations led to the formulation of the Bidimensional model of acculturation. Under this model, more importance is placed in viewing the importance immigrant populations identify with the aspects of their own culture. Under the Berry’s model of acculturation, immigrant’s attitudes are described as being focused on two points; 1) "Is it considered to be of value to maintain cultural identity and characteristics?" and 2) "Is it considered to be of value to maintain relationships with other groups?"

Various studies among Portuguese, Hungarian, Korean, and Lebanese immigrant in Canada and Indian Immigrants in the US found that the majority of these groups desired "integration" versus marginalization. Further results off the study would go on to show that these groups who desired integration suffered less from "acculturation stress" than others. According to Berry, the fact that integration was the most widely preferred mode of acculturation in his studies suggests that pluralism [where a state expects immigrants will adopt the public values of the host country (democratic ideals and criminal codes) but has mandate defining private values] may constitute the ideology that best reflects the orientation of many first-generation immigrants in North America. It can thus be argued that immigrants desire to hold on to elements of their own culture but also assimilate aspects of their host culture, thus becoming "integrated" into their host society.
