= Eurodesk =

Eurodesk Network AISBL
- Founded in 1990
- Formation: 1990; 36 years ago
- Type: INGO
- Legal status: AISBL
- Headquarters: Brussels, Belgium
- Location: Place Stephanie 6, BELGIUM
- Coordinates: 50.853318°N 4.352931°E
- Region served: Present in 38 countries
- Official languages: English, Languages of the European Union, Macedonian language, Turkish language, Icelandic language, Norwegian language, Ukrainian language Georgian language
- President: Robert Helm-Pleuger
- Main organ: Eurodesk Executive Committee (7 members)
- Parent organization: Eurodesk Brussels Link
- Volunteers: Over 3.500 multipliers and ambassadors in Europe
- Website: eurodesk.eu
- Formerly called: Eurodesk Network

Eurodesk is an international non-profit association created in 1990. It is a European network of European, national and local information centers for young people and those working with them. It offers youth information on international learning and participation opportunities and is an organisation supported by the Erasmus+ programme (2014–2027). In 2004, Eurodesk – in cooperation with the European Commission - launched the European Youth Portal.

== Mission and services ==
Eurodesk has 40 offices in 38 countries and a network of more than 3.500 multipliers and ambassadors. In those centres/offices, the Eurodesk multipliers carry out Eurodesk's mission, which is ‘to raise awareness among young people on learning mobility opportunities and encourage them to become active citizens.’ The Eurodesk network provides young people with support and information about actual mobility opportunities in Europe and worldwide. Furthermore, they offer opportunities to participate in European youth dialogues and consultations and develop their own youth projects. It manages a database of opportunities called the "Eurodesk Opportunity Finder" with over 250 programmes open to young people in Europe. Each year, the Eurodesk network carries out a European campaign "Time to Move" aimed to inform young people about such opportunities.

== Coordination of Eurodesk ==
- Eurodesk Executive Committee (board of the international association)
- Eurodesk Brussels Link (European coordination and services)
- National Eurodesk Coordinators (national information services)
- Qualified multipliers (local information services)

Eurodesk Brussels Link (EBL) is responsible for the coordination and management of the Eurodesk network. As well as offering monitoring services, acts, publications, and answering services, they ensure the national centres comply with the organisation's objectives and ultimate mission. Besides that, it provides first-hand European information on youth mobility as well as training, information management tools, quality assessment and communication resources to its national and local multipliers. Other tasks of Eurodesk Brussels Link include: supporting the European Commission in developing and maintaining the European Youth Portal, assessing the quality of Eurodesk national centres, regularly adapting European content and providing technical support.
