= Viennese German =

German dialect spoken in Vienna, Austria

Viennese
- Weanarisch, Weanerisch
- Native to: Austria (Vienna)
- Language family: Indo-European: Germanic; West Germanic; Irminonic; High German; Upper German; Bavarian; Central Bavarian; East Central Bavarian; Viennese
- Writing system: Latin (German alphabet)

Language codes
- ISO 639-3: –
- Glottolog: vien1238
- IETF: de-viennese
- Viennese dialect Viennese

Viennese German (Viennese: Weanarisch, Weanerisch; Standard German: Wienerisch) is the city dialect spoken in Vienna, the capital of Austria, and is counted among the Bavarian dialects. It is distinct from written Standard German in vocabulary, grammar, and pronunciation. Even in Lower Austria, the state surrounding the city, many of its expressions are not used, while farther to the west they are often not even understood.

== Features ==
Viennese differs from the Austrian form of Standard German, as well as from other dialects spoken in Austria.

At the beginning of the 20th century, one could differentiate among four Viennese dialects (named after the districts in which they were spoken): Favoritnerisch (Favoriten, 10th District), Meidlingerisch, (Meidling, 12th District), Ottakringerisch (Ottakring, 16th District), and Floridsdorferisch (Floridsdorf, 21st District). Today these labels are no longer applicable, and one speaks of a single Viennese dialect, with its usage varying as one moves further away from the city.

Besides the regional dialects of Old Vienna, there were also class-based dialects, or sociolects. For example, Schönbrunner Deutsch (Schönbrunn German), or German as spoken by the courtiers and attendants of the Habsburg Imperial Court at Schönbrunn Imperial Palace, was a manner of speech with an affected bored inflection combined with overenunciation. Though based on Standard German, this sociolect is influenced by Viennese. The nasal tonality was akin to Standard German spoken with a French accent. While far less used today, educated Viennese are still familiar with this court sociolect.

All in all, speaking Viennese by intonating sentences with distinctive ups and downs creates a very warm, melodic sound. This is particularly true for the "Schönbrunn" variety of Standard German, which is influenced by Viennese.

=== Phonology ===
Features typical of Viennese German include:

- Monophthongization: Compared to Standard German and to other Bavarian dialects, diphthongs are often monophthongized (somewhat similar to the way some Southern US accents turn oil into o-ol).
  For example:
  - Standard German heiß – Bavarian hoaß – Viennese haaß [haːs]
  - Standard German weiß – Viennese wääß [væːs]
  - Standard German Haus – Viennese Håås [hɒːs]
- It is typical to lengthen vowels somewhat, often at the end of a sentence. For example: Heeaasd, i bin do ned bleeed, wooos waaasn ii, wea des woooa (Standard German Hörst du, ich bin doch nicht blöd, was weiß denn ich, wer das war): "Listen, I'm not stupid; what do I know, who it was?"
- The "Meidlinger L", i.e. /l/ pronounced with velarization [ɫ] found in the working class dialect, which reflects the Czech pronunciation.
- Inserting vowels into consonant clusters (epenthesis): Likewise depending on the social class, a speaker, every now and then, may insert a vowel [ɐ] between two following consonants. That usually results in an additional syllable, which "intensifies" the word and usually has a negative feeling to it.
  Examples:
  - Standard German Verschwinde! – Viennese Vaschwind! – intensified Vaschawind!
  - Standard German Verbrecher! – Viennese Vabrecha! – intensified Vabarecha!
  - Standard German abgebrannt – Viennese oobrennt – intensified oobarennt
  - Standard German Geradeaus! – Viennese Groodaus! – intensified Garoodaus!

The following Viennese German characteristics are also found in other Bavarian dialects:

- Consonant tenseness: Voiceless fortis consonants /p, t, k/ become lenis [b̥, d̥, ɡ̊]. The [k], however, usually remains fortis when it follows a vowel.
- Vocalization of /l/ within a word after a vowel,
  e.g. also → oeso [ˈɔe̯so], Soldat → Soedot [sɔe̯ˈdɔːt], fehlen → föhn [fœːn], Kälte → Köödn [ˈkøːd̥n̩]
- Vocalization of /l/ at the end of a word, after a vowel,
  e.g. schnell → schnöö [ʃnœː], viel → vüü [fʏː]
- Unrounding front vowels after coronal consonants,
  e.g. Glück [ˈɡlʏk] → Glick [ˈɡlɪk], schön [ˈʃøːn] → schee [ˈʃẽː]
- Rounding unrounded vowels before /l/ (which may have been elided by now),
  e.g. schneller → schnöller [ˈʃnœlɐ], vielleicht → vülleicht [fʏˈlæːçt], wild → wüüd [vyːd̥]

=== Grammar ===
There are not many grammatical differences from other Bavarian dialects, but the following is typical:

- The use of the preposition ohne (without) with the dative case instead of the accusative case

=== Vocabulary ===
The dialect is distinct mostly in its vocabulary.

==== Influences ====
Vocabulary displays particular characteristics. Viennese retains many Middle High German and sometimes even Old High German roots. Furthermore, it integrated many expressions from other languages, particularly from other parts of the former Habsburg monarchy, as Vienna served as a melting pot for its constituent populations in the late 19th and early 20th centuries.

Because transcription of Viennese has not been standardised, the rendering of pronunciation here is incomplete:

==== Examples ====
- from Old High German:
  - Zähnd (Standard German Zähne, English teeth, from zand)
  - Hemad (Hemd, = English shirt, from hemidi)
- from Middle High German:
  - Greißler (=small grocer, from griuzel – diminutive of Gruz =grain)
  - Baaz (=slimy mass, from batzen=being sticky)
  - si ohgfrettn (=to struggle, from vretten)
- from Hebrew and Yiddish:
  - Masl (=luck, from Yiddish מזל mazl)
  - Hawara (=friend, companion, from Yiddish חבֿר khaver or Ashkenazi Hebrew חבר chavér)
  - Gannef (=crook, from Yiddish גנבֿ ganef)
  - Beisl (=bar, pub, from Hebrew bajis house + Yiddish diminutive suffix -ל -l = bajsl small house)
- from Czech:
  - Motschga (=unappetizing mush, from močka=residue in a pipe or a piss or from omáčka=Sauce, Soup)
  - Pfrnak (=(big) nose, from frňák)
  - Lepschi (Auf Lepschi gehen = to go out or to amuse oneself, from lepší=better)
- from Hungarian:
  - Maschekseitn (=the other side, from a másik)
  - Gattihosn (=long underpants, from gatya = trousers)
- from Italian:
  - Gspusi (=girlfriend, from sposa)
  - Gstanzl (=Stanza of a humorous song, from stanza)
  - Gusta (=appetite for something, from gusto)
- from French:
  - Trottoa (=sidewalk, from trottoir)
  - Lawua (=washbowl, from lavoir)
  - Loschie (from logis)
- from Arabic:
  - Hadscha (=a long path, from Hajj)

=== Pragmatics ===
In Viennese, the following pragmatics peculiarities are found quite often:

- Frequent ironic speech that is marked neither through intonation nor through gestures. In most cases, sarcasm must be identified through its context. Especially for foreigners, it is a source of misunderstandings. Such ironic speech is common in the Viennese sense of humour, which is better known as Wiener Schmäh.
- Understatement uses recognisable diminutive suffixes, such as -l or -erl, as in Kaffeetscherl or Plauscherl.

== Trends ==
In more recent times Viennese has moved closer to Standard German; it has developed into a kind of Standard German spoken with a typical Viennese accent (for example, the original Viennese Wos host’n fir a Notn gschriebn? becomes modern Was hast’n für eine Note gschriebn?). The typical Viennese monophthongization, through which the dialect differentiates itself from the neighboring dialects, remains, but mostly in the form of a developing "Pseudo-Standard German" that many visitors, particularly from other German-speaking areas, feel is ugly.

For example: Waaaßt, wos mir heut in der Schule für än gråååsliches Fläääsch kriegt ham? (Standard German Weißt du, was für ein widerliches Fleisch wir heute in der Schule vorgesetzt bekamen?) ("Do you know what disgusting meat we were served at school today?") The monophthongized diphthongs, like ei ~ äää or au ~ ååå, are particularly stressed and lengthened.

The reason for the convergence of the typical Viennese dialects is the attitude, strengthened by the media, that Urwienerisch (old Viennese) is associated with the lower classes. With the rising standard of living, the original Viennese can further converge, as it is considered a sign of low-class origins, while the unique Viennese words (such as Zwutschgerl) (cf Zwetschge/Zwetsche/Pflaume depending on dialect ("plum")) however generally remain in use.

Viennese dialects have always been influenced by foreign languages, particularly due to immigration. In the past 40 years immigrants mostly came from the former Yugoslavia, Turkey and most recently (East) Germany; but modern-day immigration has changed, which in turn has affected and created new varieties of modern-day Viennese. As an ongoing process, particularly in areas with a high percentage of first- and second-generation immigrants, new loanwords find their way into Viennese, and so do changes in pronunciation.

== See also ==
- Austropop
- Austrian German
- Bavarian language
