= Languaculture =

Term coined by Michael Agar for the relationship between language and culture

Languaculture means that a language includes elements such as grammar and vocabulary, past knowledge, local and cultural information, habits, and behaviors. The American anthropologist Michael Agar created the term.

== Meaning ==
Agar used the term "languaculture" for the first time in his book Language Shock: Understanding the Culture of Conversation. Languaculture is a supposed improvement on the word "linguaculture" coined by the American linguistic anthropologist Paul Friedrich. Agar explains the change by stating that "language" is a more commonly used word in English. "Lingua culture" seems to be becoming more common (cf. Risager 2012).

When Agar talks about languaculture, he defines it as the necessary tie between language and culture. He underlines that languages and cultures are always closely related and it is not possible to distinguish languages from cultures. Therefore, you cannot know a language if you don't also know the culture expressed by that language.

The notion of culture and its understanding involve the link between two different languacultures that Agar defines as LC1 (source languaculture) and LC2 (target languaculture).

== Rich points ==
The learning of target languaculture is driven by "rich points," when people realize that culture is different from their own and when they face some behaviors they do not understand. Rich points are those surprises, those departures from an outsider's expectations that signal a difference between source languaculture and target languaculture. They are the moments of incomprehension when people suddenly do not know what is happening. In this situation, different reactions are possible. People can ignore the rich point and hope the next part makes sense. People can perceive it as evidence that the person who produced it lacks something. Or people can wonder why they do not understand and if maybe some other languaculture comes into play. Therefore, rich points belong to daily life and not only to language. Agar highlights that the term rich has the positive connotations of thickness, wealth, and abundance. The most significant rich point is the incomprehension due to huge differences between source and target languaculture. In this case, people face a "culture shock" that causes deep bewilderment. The minor rich point can occur among different groups of the same community.

Rich points come from the fact that every statement implicitly refers to various elements taken for granted in a particular culture and does not match the details of another culture (cultural implicitness).

== Culture in languaculture ==
According to Agar, culture is a construction, a translation between source languaculture and target languaculture. Like a translation, it makes no sense to talk about the culture of X without saying the culture of X for Y, taking into account the standpoint from which it is observed. For this reason, culture is relational. Moreover, culture is always plural. No person or group can be completely described, explained, or generalized with a single cultural label.
